= 1954 All-Pacific Coast football team =

American all-star college football team

The 1954 All-Pacific Coast Conference football team consists of American football players chosen by the Associated Press (AP) and the United Press (UP) as the best college football players by position in the Pacific Coast Conference (PCC) during the 1954 college football season. The AP team was based on votes by AP member football writers on the west coast. The UP team was based on the choices of sports writers with assistance from the PCC coaches. The AP selections were limited to players from the AP, whereas the UP selections included non-PCC players on the second and third teams.

The 1954 UCLA Bruins football team won the PCC championship, compiled a perfect 9–0 record, and was ranked No. 1 in the final Coaches Poll. Four UCLA players received first-team honors from either the AP or the UP: backs Bob Davenport and Primo Villanueva; tackle Jack Ellena; and end Bob Long. Ellena was the only PCC player to be selected as a consensus first-team player on the 1954 All-America college football team.

California, Oregon, and USC had three players each on one or both of the first teams.

== Selections ==
=== Backs ===
- Paul Larson, California (AP-1; UP-1)
- George Shaw, Oregon (AP-1; UP-1)
- Bob Davenport, UCLA (AP-1; UP-1)
- Primo Villanueva, UCLA (AP-2; UP-1)
- Lindon Crow, USC (AP-1; UP-2)
- Jon Arnett, USC (AP-2; UP-3)
- Bill Tarr, Stanford (AP-2; UP-2)
- Duke Washington, Washington State (AP-2; UP-3)
- Bobby Cox, Washington (UP-2 [quarterback])
- Art Luppino, Arizona (UP-2)
- Jim Contratto, USC (UP-3 [quarterback])
- Jerry Drew, California (UP-3)

=== Ends ===
- Jim Hanifan, California (AP-1; UP-1)
- Bob Long, UCLA (AP-1)
- Leon Clarke, USC (AP-2; UP-2)
- John Stewart, Stanford (AP-2; UP-1)
- Bob Heydenfeldt, UCLA (UP-2)
- Jim Carmichael, California (UP-3)
- Hal Reeve, Oregon (UP-3)

=== Tackles ===
- Jack Ellena, UCLA (AP-1; UP-1)
- Ed Fouch, USC (AP-1; UP-3)
- Ron Aschbacher, Oregon State (AP-2; UP-1)
- Joe Ray, UCLA (AP-2)
- Tom Gunnari, Washington State (UP-2)
- Da Fe, SC (UP-3)

=== Guards ===
- Jim Salsbury, UCLA (AP-1; UP-1)
- Jack Patera, Oregon (AP-1; UP-1)
- Sam Boghosian, UCLA (AP-2; UP-2)
- Hardiman Cureton, UCLA (AP-2; UP-2 [tackle])
- Tom Louderback, San Jose State (UP-2)
- Burdette Hess, Idaho (UP-3)
- John Nisby, Pacific (UP-3)

=== Centers ===
- Matt Hazeltine, California (AP-1; UP-1)
- Ron Pheister, Oregon (AP-2; UP-2)
- Jerry Goldberg, Stanford (UP-3)

== Key ==
AP = Associated Press

UP = United Press

== See also ==
- 1954 College Football All-America Team
