= 1954 USC Trojans football team =

American college football season

1954 USC Trojans football

Rose Bowl, L 7–20 vs. Ohio State
- Conference: Pacific Coast Conference

Ranking
- Coaches: No. 11
- AP: No. 17
- Record: 8–4 (6–1 PCC)
- Head coach: Jess Hill (4th season)
- Home stadium: Los Angeles Memorial Coliseum

1954 Pacific Coast Conference football standings
	Conf.					Overall
Team	W		L		T	W		L		T
No. 2 UCLA $	6	–	0	–	0	9	–	0	–	0
No. 17 USC ^	6	–	1	–	0	8	–	4	–	0
Oregon	5	–	3	–	0	6	–	4	–	0
California	4	–	3	–	0	5	–	5	–	0
Washington State	3	–	4	–	0	4	–	6	–	0
Stanford	2	–	4	–	0	4	–	6	–	0
Idaho	1	–	2	–	0	4	–	5	–	0
Washington	1	–	6	–	0	2	–	8	–	0
Oregon State	1	–	6	–	0	1	–	8	–	0
$ – Conference champion; ^ – Selected as Rose Bowl representative UCLA won rivalry game over USC, but no-repeat rule was in effect; Rankings from AP Poll

The 1954 USC Trojans football team represented the University of Southern California (USC) in the Pacific Coast Conference (PCC) during the 1954 college football season. In their fourth year under head coach Jess Hill, the Trojans compiled an 8–4 record (6–1 in PCC, second), lost to Ohio State in the Rose Bowl, and outscored their opponents 258 to 159.

Jim Contratto led USC in passing with 32 of 79 passes completed for 702 yards, five touchdowns and five interceptions. Jon Arnett led the team in rushing with 96 carries for 601 yards and seven touchdowns. Lindon Crow was the leading receiver with seven catches for 274 yards and three touchdowns.

Three Trojans received first-team honors from the Associated Press on the All-Coast team: back Lindon Crow; tackle Ed Fouch; guard Jim Salsbury.

== Schedule ==
Date	Opponent	Rank	Site	Result	Attendance	Source
September 17	Washington State	No. 17	Los Angeles Memorial Coliseum; Los Angeles, CA	W 39–0	37,645	
September 24	Pittsburgh*	No. 15	Los Angeles Memorial Coliseum; Los Angeles, CA	W 27–7	50,253	
October 2	at Northwestern*	No. 9	Dyche Stadium; Evanston, IL	W 12–7	30,725	
October 8	TCU*	No. 9	Los Angeles Memorial Coliseum; Los Angeles, CA	L 7–20	52,705	
October 16	at Oregon		Multnomah Stadium; Portland, OR	W 24–14	22,766	
October 23	California	No. 17	Los Angeles Memorial Coliseum; Los Angeles, CA	W 29–27	66,342	
October 30	Oregon State	No. 13	Los Angeles Memorial Coliseum; Los Angeles, CA	W 30–0	30,065	
November 6	at Stanford	No. 10	Stanford Stadium; Stanford, CA (rivalry)	W 21–7	38,000	
November 13	Washington^{†}	No. 8	Los Angeles Memorial Coliseum; Los Angeles, CA	W 41–0	36,108	
November 20	No. 2 UCLA	No. 7	Los Angeles Memorial Coliseum; Los Angeles, CA (Victory Bell)	L 0–34	102,548	
November 27	at No. 4 Notre Dame*	No. 17	Notre Dame Stadium; Notre Dame, IN (rivalry)	L 17–23	56,438	
January 1, 1955	vs. No. 1 Ohio State*	No. 17	Rose Bowl; Pasadena, CA (Rose Bowl)	L 7–20	89,191	
*Non-conference game; ^{†}Homecoming; Rankings from AP Poll released prior to the game; Source:

== Game summaries ==
=== UCLA ===
	1	2	3	4	Total
UCLA	7	0	0	27	34
USC	0	0	0	0	0

== Players ==
- Jon Arnett, sophomore tailback (#26), earned second-team All-Coast honors from the UP
- Al Barry, senior right guard
- George Belotti, tackle
- Bing Bordier, right end
- Ron Brown
- Ron Calabria, wingback
- Leon Clarke, left end, second-team All-Coast honors from coaches
- Frank Clayton, left halfback
- Jim Contratto, quarterback
- Lindon Crow, second-team All-Coast (co-captain)
- Aramis Dandoy, tailback, won All-Coast honors from INS
- Mario DaRe, tackle
- Jim Decker, fullback
- Gordon Duvall, fullback
- Dirk Eldredge, center
- Dick Enright, right guard
- Orlando Ferrante, guard, first-team All-Coast honors from coaches, second-string All-Coast honors from INS
- Ed Fouch, right tackle, first-team All-Coast (co-captain)
- George Galli, guard
- Marv Goux, linebacker, led the team in defensive statistics
- Chuck Greenwood, right end
- Chuck Griffith, right end
- Frank Hall, back
- Roger Hooks quarterback
- Bob Isaacson, guard
- Chuck Leimbach, end
- Don McFarland, end
- Ernie Merk, back
- John Miller, guard
- Frank Pavich, guard and tackle
- Vern Sampson, center
- Irwin Spector, guard, Brooklyn, New York
- Joe Tisdale, fullback
- Sam Tsagalakis, placekicker

== Coaching staff and other personnel ==
- Head coach: Jess Hill
- Assistant coaches: Mel Hein (line coach - centers and tackles), Don Clark (line coach - guards and defensive patterns), Bill Fisk (ends), George Ceithaml (backfield coach), Nick Pappas (defensive backs), Jess Mortensen (freshman coach)
- Yell kings: Don Ward, Jerry Stolp, Phil Reilly, Shep Aparicio, Bob Mandel
- Manager: Peter Couden
