= 1954 Washington State Cougars football team =

American college football season

1954 Washington State Cougars football
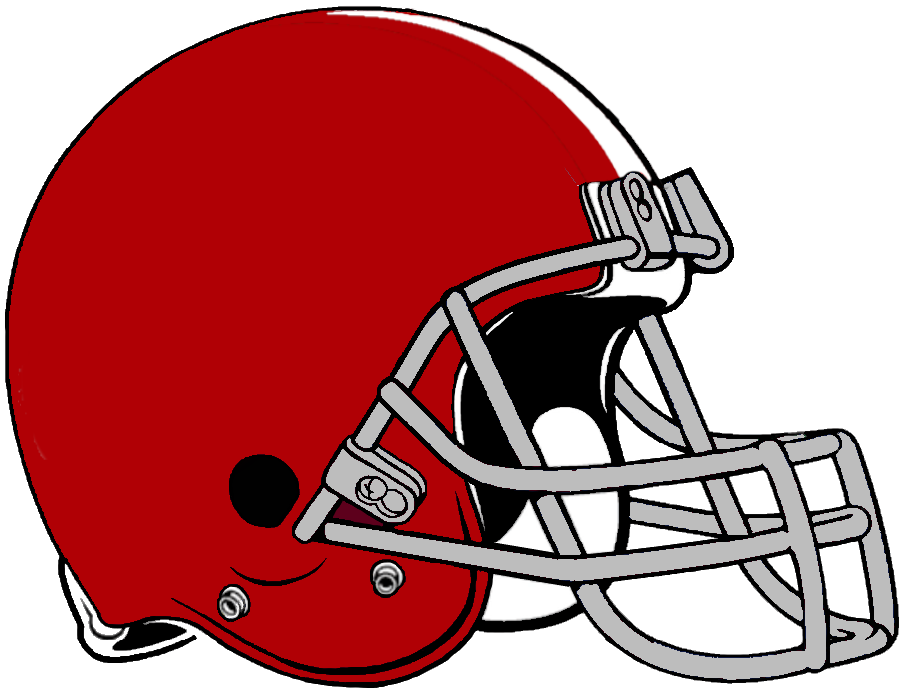
- Conference: Pacific Coast Conference
- Record: 4–6 (3–4 PCC)
- Head coach: Al Kircher (3rd season)
- Home stadium: Rogers Field, Memorial Stadium

1954 Pacific Coast Conference football standings
| | Conf. | | | | | Overall |
| Team | W | | L | | T | W | | L | | T |
|---|---|---|---|---|---|---|---|---|---|---|
| No. 2 UCLA $ | 6 | – | 0 | – | 0 | 9 | – | 0 | – | 0 |
| No. 17 USC ^ | 6 | – | 1 | – | 0 | 8 | – | 4 | – | 0 |
| Oregon | 5 | – | 3 | – | 0 | 6 | – | 4 | – | 0 |
| California | 4 | – | 3 | – | 0 | 5 | – | 5 | – | 0 |
| Washington State | 3 | – | 4 | – | 0 | 4 | – | 6 | – | 0 |
| Stanford | 2 | – | 4 | – | 0 | 4 | – | 6 | – | 0 |
| Idaho | 1 | – | 2 | – | 0 | 4 | – | 5 | – | 0 |
| Washington | 1 | – | 6 | – | 0 | 2 | – | 8 | – | 0 |
| Oregon State | 1 | – | 6 | – | 0 | 1 | – | 8 | – | 0 |
$ – Conference champion; ^ – Selected as Rose Bowl representative UCLA won rivalry game over USC, but no-repeat rule was in effect; Rankings from AP Poll

The 1954 Washington State Cougars football team was an American football team that represented Washington State College during the 1954 college football season. Led by third-year head coach Al Kircher, the team was 4–6 overall and 3–4 in the Pacific Coast Conference. Three home games were played on campus in Pullman at Rogers Field, with one in Spokane in late September.

The Cougars defeated rival Washington for the second straight year, but were shut out at home by neighbor Idaho in the Battle of the Palouse, which was the Vandals' first win in the series in 29 years.

The Washington rivalry game (now the Apple Cup) was held in Pullman for the first time since 1948 and was the last until 1982; all three were Cougar victories. Of the fifteen games played in Spokane from 1950 through 1980, Washington State won only three (1958, 1968, 1972), while winning five times in Seattle.

== Schedule ==
| Date | Opponent | Site | Result | Attendance | Source |
|---|---|---|---|---|---|
| September 17 | at No. 17 USC | Los Angeles Memorial Coliseum; Los Angeles, CA | L 0–39 | 37,645 | |
| September 25 | Pacific (CA)* | Memorial Stadium; Spokane, WA | W 18–0 | 12,000 | |
| October 2 | at No. 12 Texas* | Memorial Stadium; Austin, TX | L 14–40 | 27,000 | |
| October 9 | Oregon State^{†} | Rogers Field; Pullman, WA | W 34–6 | 15,000 | |
| October 16 | at California | California Memorial Stadium; Berkeley, CA | L 7–17 | 27,000 | |
| October 23 | Idaho | Rogers Field; Pullman, WA (Battle of the Palouse) | L 0–10 | 17,000 | |
| October 30 | at Stanford | Stanford Stadium; Stanford, CA | W 30–26 | 13,000 | |
| November 6 | at Michigan State* | Macklin Stadium; East Lansing, MI | L 6–54 | 45,849 | |
| November 13 | at Oregon | Hayward Field; Eugene, OR | L 14–26 | 16,500 | |
| November 20 | Washington | Rogers Field; Pullman, WA (rivalry) | W 26–7 | 18,000 | |
*Non-conference game; ^{†}Homecoming; Rankings from AP Poll released prior to the game; Source:

== NFL draft ==
Four Cougars were selected in the 1955 NFL draft, which was 30 rounds and 360 selections.

| Player | Position | Round | Overall | Franchise |
|---|---|---|---|---|
| Duke Washington | Back | 10 | 118 | Philadelphia Eagles |
| Tom Gunnari | Tackle | 23 | 274 | San Francisco 49ers |
| Bob Peringer | End | 27 | 317 | Green Bay Packers |
| Bruce Nevitt | Center | 27 | 319 | Los Angeles Rams |
