= Primo Villanueva =

American gridiron football player (born 1931)

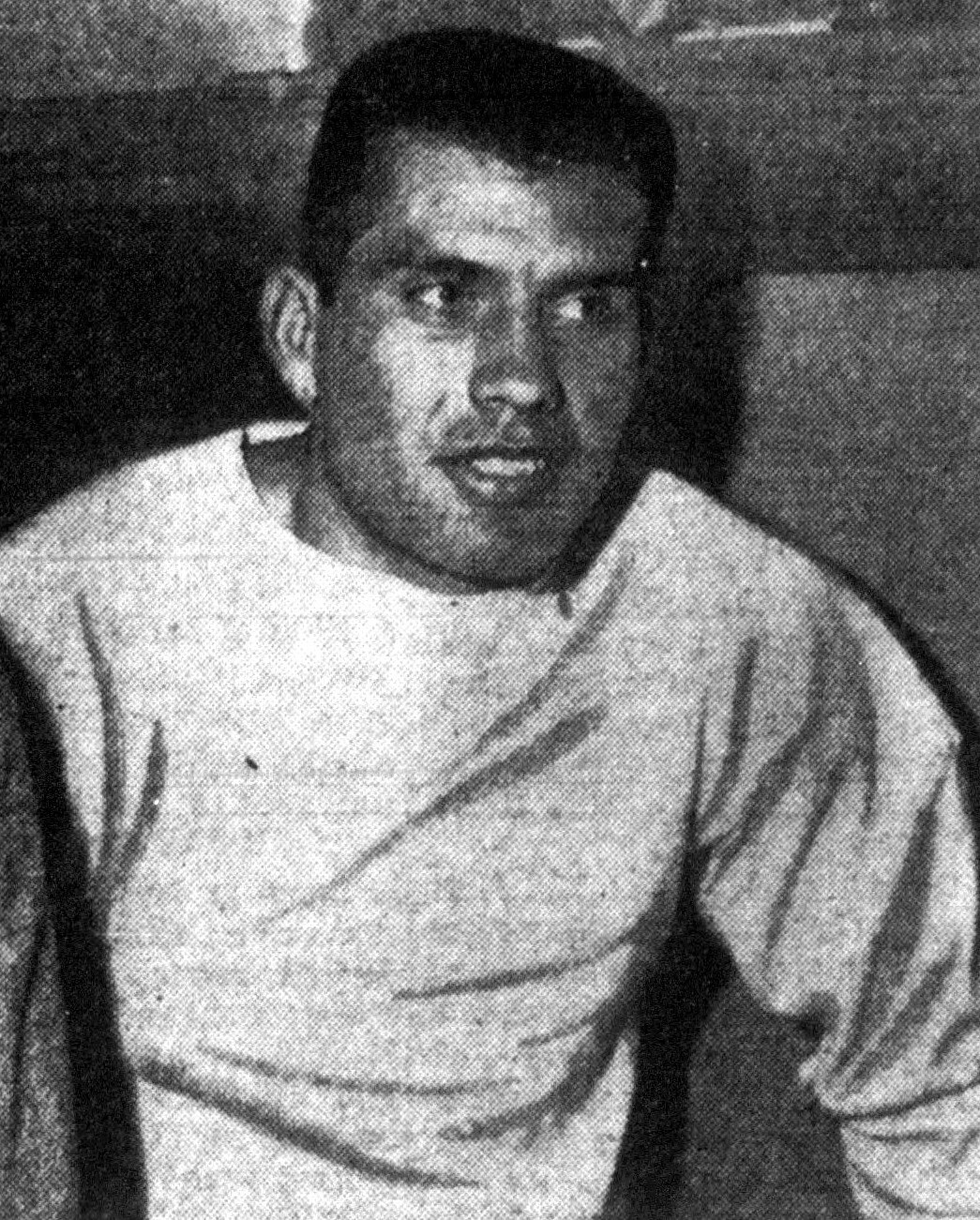
- Villanueva, circa 1953

Profile
- Position: Halfback

Personal information
- Born: December 2, 1931 (age 94); Tucumcari, New Mexico, U.S.

Career information
- College: UCLA

Career history
- 1955–1960: BC Lions

Awards and highlights
- National champion (1954); Second-team All-American (1954); First-team All-PCC (1954)

Primo Villanueva (born December 2, 1931) is an American former gridiron football player. He played college football at the University of California, Los Angeles (UCLA), leading the national championship 1954 UCLA Bruins football team in total offense. He subsequently played for the BC Lions in the Canadian Football League (CFL). After his football career ended, Villanueva became a successful restaurateur in Vancouver, British Columbia.

== Biography ==
=== Early life ===
Villanueva is a Mexican-American who grew up in Calexico and attended Central Union High School in California's Imperial Valley. He had eleven siblings, and his father, Primitivo, fought against Pancho Villa in 1916 and was granted immunity to enter the United States. He attended Central Union High School where he gained recognition as the best athlete in Imperial Valley prep sports history, after earning All-CIF honors for three straight years in three sports: football, basketball, baseball)\. He also ran track.

=== Football player ===
Villanueva accepted a football scholarship to play for the University of California, Los Angeles (UCLA), over offers from the University of Arizona and Arizona State University.

Villanueva played halfback and defensive back for coach Henry Russell Sanders's UCLA Bruins from 1952 to 1954 and was known as the "Calexico Kid". He was a member of the 1953 Bruins team that played in the 1954 Rose Bowl and the 1954 team went 9–0 and was named national champions by the FWAA and the United Press International (UPI). In a nine-game season, Villanueva led the 1954 Bruins in total offense with 886 yards—486 yards rushing and 400 yards passing. He also had 106 yards on punt returns, 80 yards on four kickoff returns, and 21 yards on two pass interceptions. He scored nine rushing touchdowns and five receiving touchdowns and was considered "a clutch defender." He helped save UCLA's undefeated season with a pass deflection late in a 21–20 win over the Washington Huskies. After he rushed for two touchdowns and passed for another in a UCLA victory over Cal, the headline in the Los Angeles Times sports section read: "VILLANUEVA SPARKS BRUINS TO 27-6 WIN: Calexico Kid Bests Larson, Cal."

At the end of the 1954 season, Villanueva was selected to play in the Senior Bowl in Mobile, Alabama, and was named a second-team College Football All-American by the United Press.

In January 1955, the Southern California Council of Mexican-American Affairs honored Villanueva at its first testimonial dinner. At the time, Los Angeles Times columnist Dick Hyland pointed to Villanueva as an example for the city's youth:

Primo Villanueva was and is an athlete, a great football player. But he was not always so. ... Ask Primo Villanueva about some of the boys he was raised with -- and be sure and ask him what athletics did for him.

After graduating from UCLA, Villanueva played professional football for the BC Lions of the Canadian Football League (CFL) from 1955 to 1960. In September 1956, Villanueva took over as the Lions quarterback and led BC to an 11–1 win over the Edmonton Eskimos—breaking an eleven-game losing streak against Edmonton.

=== Restaurateur ===
In 1959, Villanueva opened a Mexican restaurant, Primo's Mexican Grill, in Vancouver, British Columbia. After his first restaurant became a popular and successful Vancouver establishment, Villanueva opened additional restaurants in Calgary, Edmonton(1970), West Vancouver, North Vancouver, and Richmond. Villanueva was a successful restaurateur for more than 40 years before turning over management to his son in the 1990s. He also founded a business that made and sold salsa, chips and tortillas. In March 2009, he was inducted into the British Columbia Restaurant Hall of Fame.

=== Family ===
As of 2006, the Los Angeles Times reported that Villanueva was living in Surrey, British Columbia with his second wife, Phyllis.

Villanueva's younger brother, Danny Villanueva, was a punter and place-kicker for the Los Angeles Rams and Dallas Cowboys. He was known as the "El Toe-reador", led the NFL in punting in 1962, and led the Rams in scoring in 1960, 1961, 1962 and 1963. Interviewed in 1962, Danny Villanueva recalled playing football with Primo as a boy:

Danny says his mother used to listen to their high school game on the radio back home in Tucumcari and lock them out when they played poorly.
