= 1954 Rose Bowl =

American college football game

- 40th Rose Bowl Game
Michigan State Spartans	UCLA Bruins
(8–1)	(9–1)
Big Ten	Pacific Coast
28	20
Head coach: Biggie Munn	Head coach: Red Sanders
AP / Coaches; 3 / 3	AP / Coaches; 5 / 4
	1	2	3	4	Total
Michigan State	0	7	14	7	28
UCLA	7	7	0	6	20
- Date: January 1, 1954
- Season: 1953
- Stadium: Rose Bowl
- Location: Pasadena, California
- MVP: Billy Wells (Michigan State HB)
- Favorite: Michigan State by 7 points
- National anthem: UCLA Band and Michigan State Marching Band combined
- Referee: George Rennix (Big Ten; split crew: Big Ten, Pacific Coast)
- Halftime show: UCLA Band, Michigan State Marching Band
- Attendance: 100,500

United States TV coverage
- Network: NBC
- Announcers: Mel Allen, Tom Harmon

The 1954 Rose Bowl was the 40th edition of the college football bowl game, played at the Rose Bowl in Pasadena, California, on Friday, January 1. The third-ranked Michigan State Spartans of the Big Ten Conference defeated the #5 UCLA Bruins of the Pacific Coast Conference, 28–20. Michigan State halfback Billy Wells scored two touchdowns and was named the Player of the Game.

This was the first year that Michigan State was counted in the Big Ten football standings, having been a member since 1950. This Rose Bowl had the first color television "colorcast," viewable on 200 sets across the United States.

== Teams ==
=== Michigan State College Spartans ===
The Michigan State Spartans had joined the Big Ten in 1950, but did not play a full schedule until 1953. They only lost one game, 6–0, at Purdue, which broke a 28-game winning streak, with two national championships. The Spartans were co-champions with Illinois, and the two did not meet this season. However, Illinois had last appeared in the 1952 Rose Bowl. Head coach Biggie Munn announced his retirement before the game.

=== UCLA Bruins ===
In the 1952 season, the Bruins lost only once, to rival USC 12–14. Both teams had been undefeated and the Trojans took the Rose Bowl berth. In 1953, the Bruins again lost only one regular season game, 20–21 at Stanford on October 17; Stanford was later defeated by USC on November 7. With the Rose Bowl again on the line for both teams, UCLA defeated USC 13–0 to win the Pacific Coast Conference outright and gain the New Year's Day berth in Pasadena.

== Game summary ==
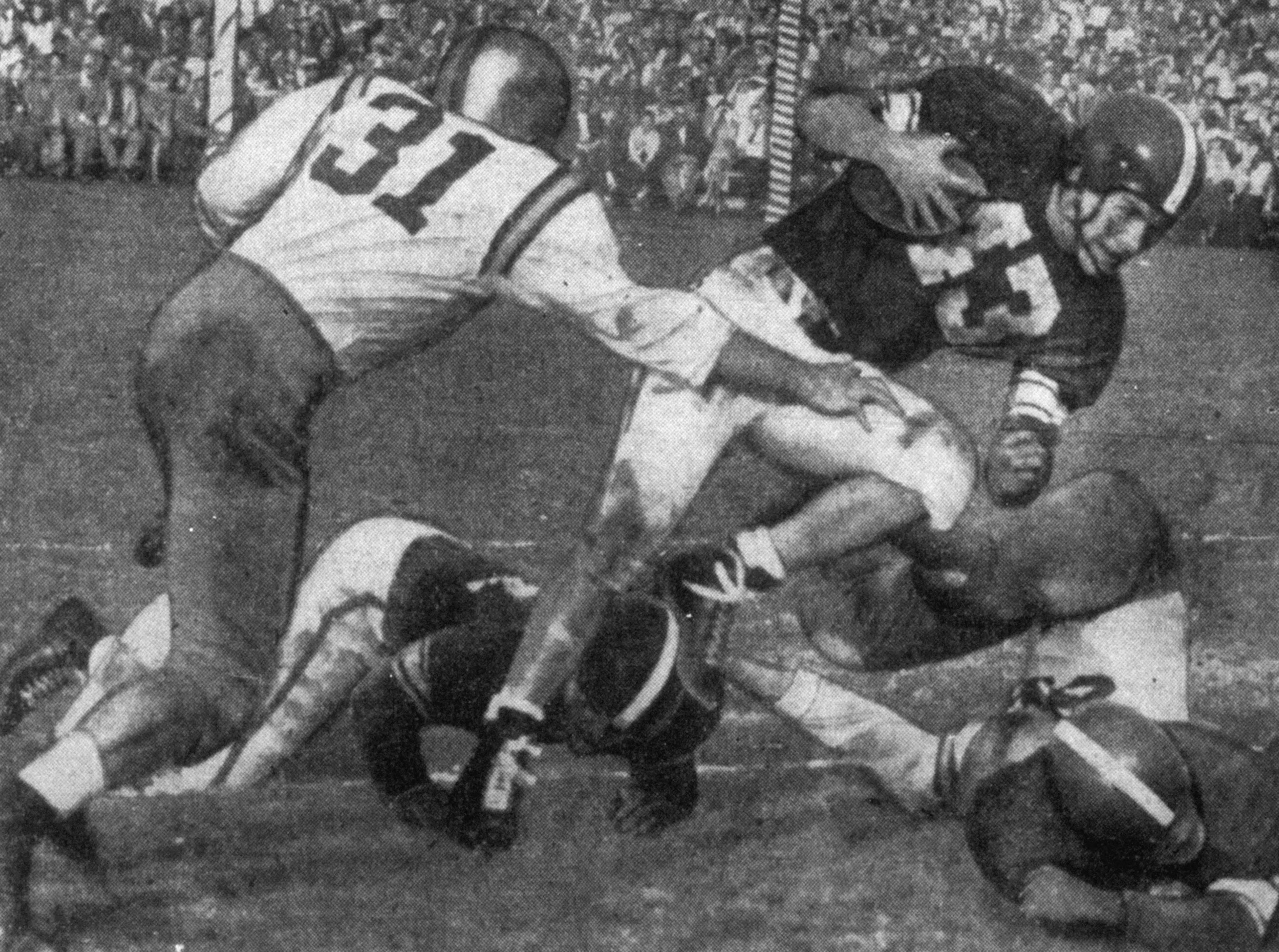

This was the first meeting between the two schools. It was the first Rose Bowl appearance for the Spartans; they had previously only played in the 1938 Orange Bowl. It was the third bowl appearance for the Bruins, all in the Rose (1943, 1947). The weather was sunny; the Spartans wore their green home jerseys and the Bruins wore their white road jerseys with the "UCLA Stripe" introduced earlier in the 1953 season. Michigan State fumbled twice in the first half, which allowed the Bruins the first two scores. The Spartans had only one completed pass and 56 yards in the first half; they scored a touchdown with 4:45 remaining in the first half.

Victor Postula knocked down four Bruin passes; head coach Biggie Munn instituted a "split-line offense" against the Bruins.

The Spartans assembled two long drives in the third quarter to pull ahead 21–14. The Bruins recovered another Spartan fumble and scored to pull within a point at 21–20, but the extra point kick failed. Billy Wells of Michigan State returned a punt 62 yards for a touchdown with 4:51 left in the game.

=== Scoring ===
==== First quarter ====
- UCLA — Bill Stits 13-yard pass from Paul Cameron. John Hermann converts.

==== Second quarter ====
- UCLA — Cameron, two-yard run. Hermann converts.
- MSU — Ellis Duckett, six-yard blocked punt return. Evan Slonac converts.

==== Third quarter ====
- MSU — Leroy Bolden, one-yard run. Slonac converts.
- MSU — Billy Wells, two-yard run. Slonac converts.

==== Fourth quarter ====
- UCLA — Rommie Loudd, 28-yard pass from Cameron. Kick failed.
- MSU — Wells, 62-yard punt return. Slonac converts.

=== Statistics ===
Team stats	Mich. St.	UCLA
First downs	14	16
Net Yards Rushing	195	90
Net Yards Passing	11	152
Total Yards	206	242
PC–PA–Int.	2–10–1	9–24–2
Punts–Avg.	5–35.4	6–38.6
Fumbles–Lost	4–4	4–3
Penalties–Yards	2–15	4–30

== Aftermath ==
- In the next season, UCLA went undefeated and shared the national championship. It was the first "split" championship in college football, when the writers (AP) selected Ohio State and the coaches (UP) chose UCLA. The Bruins didn't play in the Rose Bowl because of the PCC's no-repeat rule.
- Billy Wells died in December 2001.

== Game facts ==
In their first official season in the Big Ten, the Spartans led the league in the number of black players. Michigan State's eight black athletes represented nearly a quarter of all African Americans in the entire conference.

== UCLA roster ==
=== Players ===
- Bruce Ballard
- Warner Benjamin
- Bob Bergdahl
- Sam Boghosian
- Doug Bradley
- Richard Braunbeck
- Jim Brown
- Sam Brown
- Hardiman Cureton
- Bob Davenport
- Terry Debay
- Jim Decker
- Preston Dills
- Chuck Doud (co-captain)
- Jack Ellena
- John Farhood
- Rudy Feldman (co-captain)
- Russ Hampton
- Johnny Hermann
- Bob Heydenfeldt
- Bob Long
- Rommie Loudd
- Gerry McDougall
- Jack McKay
- Gil Moreno
- Clarence Norris
- Gerry Okuneff
- Steve Palmer
- Doug Peters
- Dave Peterson
- Joe Ray
- Mike Riskas
- Jim Salisbury
- Don Schinnick
- Tom Thaxter
- Primo Villanueva
- Roger White

=== Coaches ===
- Red Sanders (head coach)
- William F. Barnes
- Deke Brackett
- George W. Dickerson
- Johnny Johnson
- Jim Myers
- Tommy Prothro
