= 1954 Oregon State Beavers football team =

American college football season

1954 Oregon State Beavers football
- Head coach Kip Taylor
- Conference: Pacific Coast Conference
- Record: 1–8 (1–6 PCC)
- Head coach: Kip Taylor (6th season)
- Home stadium: Parker Stadium; Multnomah Stadium

1954 Pacific Coast Conference football standings
	Conf.					Overall
Team	W		L		T	W		L		T
No. 2 UCLA $	6	–	0	–	0	9	–	0	–	0
No. 17 USC ^	6	–	1	–	0	8	–	4	–	0
Oregon	5	–	3	–	0	6	–	4	–	0
California	4	–	3	–	0	5	–	5	–	0
Washington State	3	–	4	–	0	4	–	6	–	0
Stanford	2	–	4	–	0	4	–	6	–	0
Idaho	1	–	2	–	0	4	–	5	–	0
Washington	1	–	6	–	0	2	–	8	–	0
Oregon State	1	–	6	–	0	1	–	8	–	0
$ – Conference champion; ^ – Selected as Rose Bowl representative UCLA won rivalry game over USC, but no-repeat rule was in effect; Rankings from AP Poll

The 1954 Oregon State Beavers football team represented Oregon State College in the Pacific Coast Conference (PCC) during the 1954 college football season. In their sixth and final season under head coach Kip Taylor, the Beavers compiled an overall record of 1–8 with a mark of 1–6 conference play, tying for eighth place in the PCC, and were outscored 296 to 60. The team won the opener at home against Idaho, but then had eight consecutive losses. The Beavers played three home games on campus at Parker Stadium in Corvallis, with one at Multnomah Stadium in Portland.

The loss to Oregon in the Civil War was Taylor's first to the rival Ducks; he resigned two days later, as did his three assistants (Len Younce (line), Ward Cuff (backs), and Hal Moe (ends)). In six years, Taylor had an overall record of 20–36–0 (.357), 15–30 in PCC.

== Schedule ==
Date	Opponent	Site	Result	Attendance	Source
September 25	Idaho	Parker Stadium; Corvallis, OR	W 13–0	9,000	
October 2	Washington	Multnomah Stadium; Portland, OR	L 7–17	19,667	
October 9	at Washington State	Rogers Field; Pullman, WA	L 6–34	15,000	
October 16	at Nebraska*	Memorial Stadium; Lincoln, NE	L 7–27	39,000	
October 23	No. 3 UCLA	Parker Stadium; Corvallis, OR	L 0–61	8,500	
October 30	at No. 13 USC	Los Angeles Memorial Coliseum; Los Angeles, CA	L 0–34	30,065	
November 6	at No. 14 Minnesota*	Memorial Stadium; Minneapolis, MN	L 6–44	49,000	
November 13	at California	California Memorial Stadium; Berkeley, CA	L 7–46	22,000	
November 20	Oregon	Parker Stadium; Corvallis, OR (Civil War)	L 14–33	21,200	
*Non-conference game; Rankings from AP Poll released prior to the game; Source:

== Coaching staff ==
- Len Younce, line
- Ward Cuff, backs
- Hal Moe, ends
- Dick Twenge, freshmen
