= 1954 Idaho Vandals football team =

American college football season

1954 Idaho Vandals football
- Conference: Pacific Coast Conference
- Record: 4–5 (1–2 PCC)
- Head coach: Skip Stahley (1st season)
- Offensive scheme: T formation
- Captain: Burdette Hess
- Home stadium: Neale Stadium

1954 Pacific Coast Conference football standings
	Conf.					Overall
Team	W		L		T	W		L		T
No. 2 UCLA $	6	–	0	–	0	9	–	0	–	0
No. 17 USC ^	6	–	1	–	0	8	–	4	–	0
Oregon	5	–	3	–	0	6	–	4	–	0
California	4	–	3	–	0	5	–	5	–	0
Washington State	3	–	4	–	0	4	–	6	–	0
Stanford	2	–	4	–	0	4	–	6	–	0
Idaho	1	–	2	–	0	4	–	5	–	0
Washington	1	–	6	–	0	2	–	8	–	0
Oregon State	1	–	6	–	0	1	–	8	–	0
$ – Conference champion; ^ – Selected as Rose Bowl representative UCLA won rivalry game over USC, but no-repeat rule was in effect; Rankings from AP Poll

The 1954 Idaho Vandals football team represented the University of Idaho in the 1954 college football season. The Vandals were led by first-year head coach Skip Stahley and were members of the Pacific Coast Conference. Three home games were played on campus at Neale Stadium in Moscow, with another in Boise at old Bronco Stadium at Boise Junior College.

Idaho compiled a 4–5 overall record and were 1–2 in the PCC. After five losses to open, they won their last four games. Six of the nine games were shutouts, with three wins and three losses. The four-game winning streak was the program's longest in decades.

In the Battle of the Palouse with neighbor Washington State, the 0–5 Vandals blanked the Cougars 10–0 in Pullman on October 23 for Stahley's first victory as head coach. It was Idaho's first win in the series in 29 years; the next came ten years later in 1964.

The annual game with Montana was not played this year; outside of wartime years (without teams), it was the first break in the rivalry in forty years. Idaho was three games into an eight-game streak over the Grizzlies and retained the Little Brown Stein until 1960.

After the win in Pullman, Idaho defeated favored Utah in Salt Lake City, then shut out North Dakota in Moscow and BYU in Boise.

A former head coach at Toledo and an assistant at Washington and in the NFL with the Cardinals, Stahley was hired in February, at an annual salary of $9,000. He remained as Idaho's head coach for eight seasons, then continued as athletic director for three more years.

== Schedule ==
Date	Time	Opponent	Site	Result	Attendance	Source
September 18	2:00 pm	Oregon	Neale Stadium; Moscow, ID	L 0–41	7,000	
September 25	1:30 pm	at Oregon State	Parker Stadium; Corvallis, OR	L 0–13	9,000	
October 2	2:00 pm	San Jose State*^{†}	Neale Stadium; Moscow, ID	L 7–38	10,000	
October 9	8:00 pm	at Pacific (CA)*	Pacific Memorial Stadium; Stockton, CA	L 0–13	9,500	
October 16	7:00 pm	at Arizona*	Arizona Stadium; Tucson, AZ	L 13–25	17,000	
October 23	2:00 pm	at Washington State	Rogers Field; Pullman, WA (Battle of the Palouse)	W 10–0	12,000	
October 30	1:00 pm	at Utah*	Ute Stadium; Salt Lake City, UT	W 14–13	14,065	
November 13	1:30 pm	North Dakota*	Neale Stadium; Moscow, ID	W 45–0	6,000	
November 20	1:00 pm	vs. Brigham Young*	old Bronco Stadium; Boise, ID	W 7–0	10,000	
*Non-conference game; ^{†}Homecoming; All times are in Pacific time

== Coaching staff ==
- Earl Klapstein, line
- Jay Pattee, backs
- Gene Stauber, ends
- Clem Parberry, freshmen

== All-conference ==
No Vandals were on the All-PCC team or the second team. Honorable mention were fullback Wilbur Gary and guard Burdette Hess.

== NFL draft ==
One senior from the 1954 Vandals was selected in the 1955 NFL draft:

Player	Position	Round	Pick	Franchise
Burdette Hess	G	15th	178	San Francisco 49ers

One sophomore was selected in the 1957 NFL draft:

Player	Position	Round	Pick	Franchise
Dick Foster	T	11th	129	Washington Redskins

Four members of the freshman team were selected in the 1958 NFL draft:

Player	Position	Round	Pick	Franchise
Jerry Kramer	G	4th	39	Green Bay Packers
Wayne Walker	C	4th	45	Detroit Lions
Larry Aldrich	E	11th	127	Pittsburgh Steelers
Wade Patterson	E	16th	183	Chicago Cardinals
