= 1954 Stanford Indians football team =

American college football season

1954 Stanford Indians football
- Conference: Pacific Coast Conference
- Record: 4–6 (2–4 PCC)
- Head coach: Chuck Taylor (4th season)
- Home stadium: Stanford Stadium

1954 Pacific Coast Conference football standings
	Conf.					Overall
Team	W		L		T	W		L		T
No. 2 UCLA $	6	–	0	–	0	9	–	0	–	0
No. 17 USC ^	6	–	1	–	0	8	–	4	–	0
Oregon	5	–	3	–	0	6	–	4	–	0
California	4	–	3	–	0	5	–	5	–	0
Washington State	3	–	4	–	0	4	–	6	–	0
Stanford	2	–	4	–	0	4	–	6	–	0
Idaho	1	–	2	–	0	4	–	5	–	0
Washington	1	–	6	–	0	2	–	8	–	0
Oregon State	1	–	6	–	0	1	–	8	–	0
$ – Conference champion; ^ – Selected as Rose Bowl representative UCLA won rivalry game over USC, but no-repeat rule was in effect; Rankings from AP Poll

The 1954 Stanford Indians football team represented Stanford University in the 1954 college football season. The team was led by Chuck Taylor in his fourth year. The team played their home games at Stanford Stadium in Stanford, California.

Stanford's loss to San Jose State was the team's first-ever loss in the rivalry series that began in 1900. The team's 72–0 loss to UCLA remains Stanford's largest-ever margin of defeat.

== Schedule ==
Date	Opponent	Rank	Site	Result	Attendance	Source
September 17	at Pacific (CA)		Pacific Memorial Stadium; Stockton, CA	W 13–12	28,000	
September 25	vs. No. 16 Oregon		Multnomah Stadium; Portland, OR	W 18–13	30,214	
October 2	Illinois*		Stanford Stadium; Stanford, CA	W 12–2	30,000	
October 9	No. 19 Navy*	No. 17	Stanford Stadium; Stanford, CA	L 0–25	55,000	
October 16	at No. 3 UCLA		Los Angeles Memorial Coliseum; Los Angeles, CA	L 0–72	70,555	
October 23	Washington		Stanford Stadium; Stanford, CA	W 13–7	17,000	
October 30	Washington State		Stanford Stadium; Stanford, CA	L 26–30	13,000	
November 6	No. 10 USC		Stanford Stadium; Stanford, CA (rivalry)	L 7–21	38,000	
November 13	San Jose State*		Stanford Stadium; Stanford, CA (rivalry)	L 14–19	16,000	
November 20	at California		California Memorial Stadium; Berkeley, CA (Big Game)	L 20–28	81,490	
*Non-conference game; Rankings from AP Poll released prior to the game; Source:

== Players drafted by the NFL ==
Player	Position	Round	Pick	NFL club
Don Sanders	Back	28	332	San Francisco 49ers
