= Sam Boghosian =

American football player and coach (1931–2020)

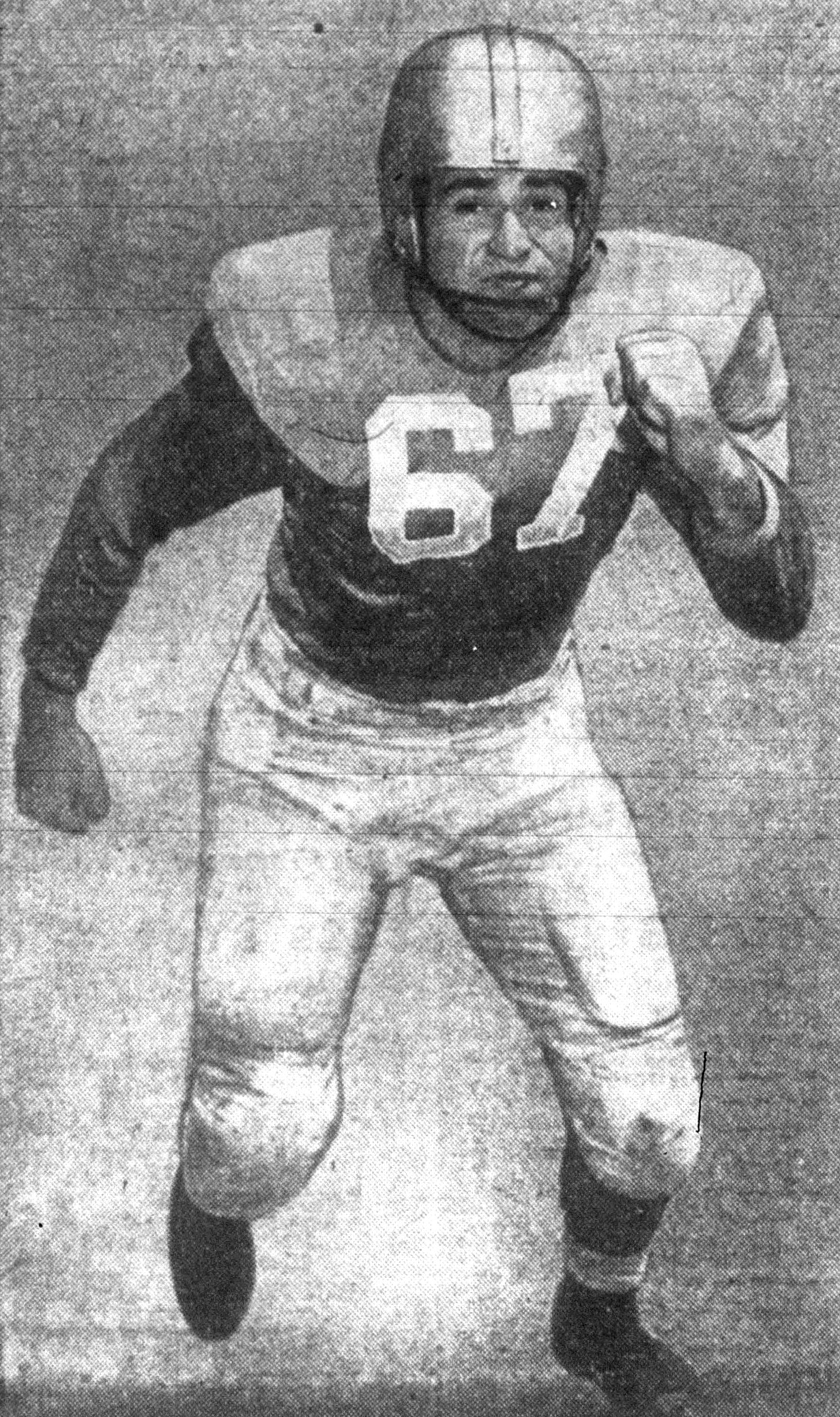
- Boghosian, circa 1953

Biographical details
- Born: December 22, 1931; Fresno, California, U.S.
- Died: February 26, 2020 (aged 88); Indian Wells, California, U.S.

Playing career
- 1952–1954: UCLA
- Position: Guard

Coaching career (HC unless noted)
- 1957–1964: UCLA (assistant)
- 1965–1972: Oregon State (OL)
- 1973–1974: Oregon State (OC)
- 1975: Houston Oilers (OL)
- 1976–1977: Seattle Seahawks (OL)
- 1979–1987: Oakland/L.A. Raiders (OL)

Accomplishments and honors

Championships
- National (1954)

Awards
- Second-team All-PCC (1954); UCLA Athletics Hall of Fame; Two-time Super Bowl winner (XV, XVIII)

Sam Boghosian (December 22, 1931 – February 26, 2020) was an American college and professional football coach. He played college football as a guard for the UCLA Bruins, and was later an assistant coach at his alma mater. Boghosian was a key member of the 1954 national championship team in his senior season and was inducted into the UCLA Athletics Hall of Fame. As an offensive line coach, he won two Super Bowls with the Oakland / Los Angeles Raiders.

== Playing career ==
Born and raised in Fresno, California, Boghosian graduated from Fresno High School and played for head coach Red Sanders at the University of California, Los Angeles (UCLA) from 1952 through 1954. He was a member of the 1953 Bruins team that won the Pacific Coast Conference (PCC) title and went to the Rose Bowl. The following year's team went undefeated and was named FWAA and UPI national champions; the Bruins did not return to the Rose Bowl due to a no-repeat rule, enacted by the PCC several years earlier (after three straight losses by California).

== Coaching career ==
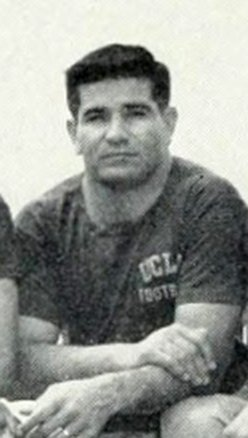
Boghosian as UCLA assistant coach (1960)

Boghosian became a member of Sanders' coaching staff in 1957 and remained there through 1964 under Bill Barnes, then joined the staff of new head coach Dee Andros at Oregon State in Corvallis. In late 1965, he interviewed for the Oklahoma Sooners' head coaching job, but Jim Mackenzie was hired. Boghosian remained at OSU through 1974, when he joined the Houston Oilers coaching staff. In 1976, he joined the expansion Seattle Seahawks as offensive line coach, but left coaching prior to the 1978 season to focus on business.

Boghosian returned to coaching in 1979 as offensive line coach with the Oakland Raiders, and helped them to two Super Bowl wins (XV, XVIII), the latter after the franchise moved to Los Angeles. He was offered the Oregon State head coaching job in late 1984, but declined. The Raiders fell to 5–10 in 1987, his ninth year with the team, and he was one of five assistants let go.

== Honors ==
Boghosian was inducted into the Fresno County Athletic Hall of Fame in 1978, and the UCLA Athletics Hall of Fame in 1999.
