= Jess Hill =

American baseball player (1907–1993)

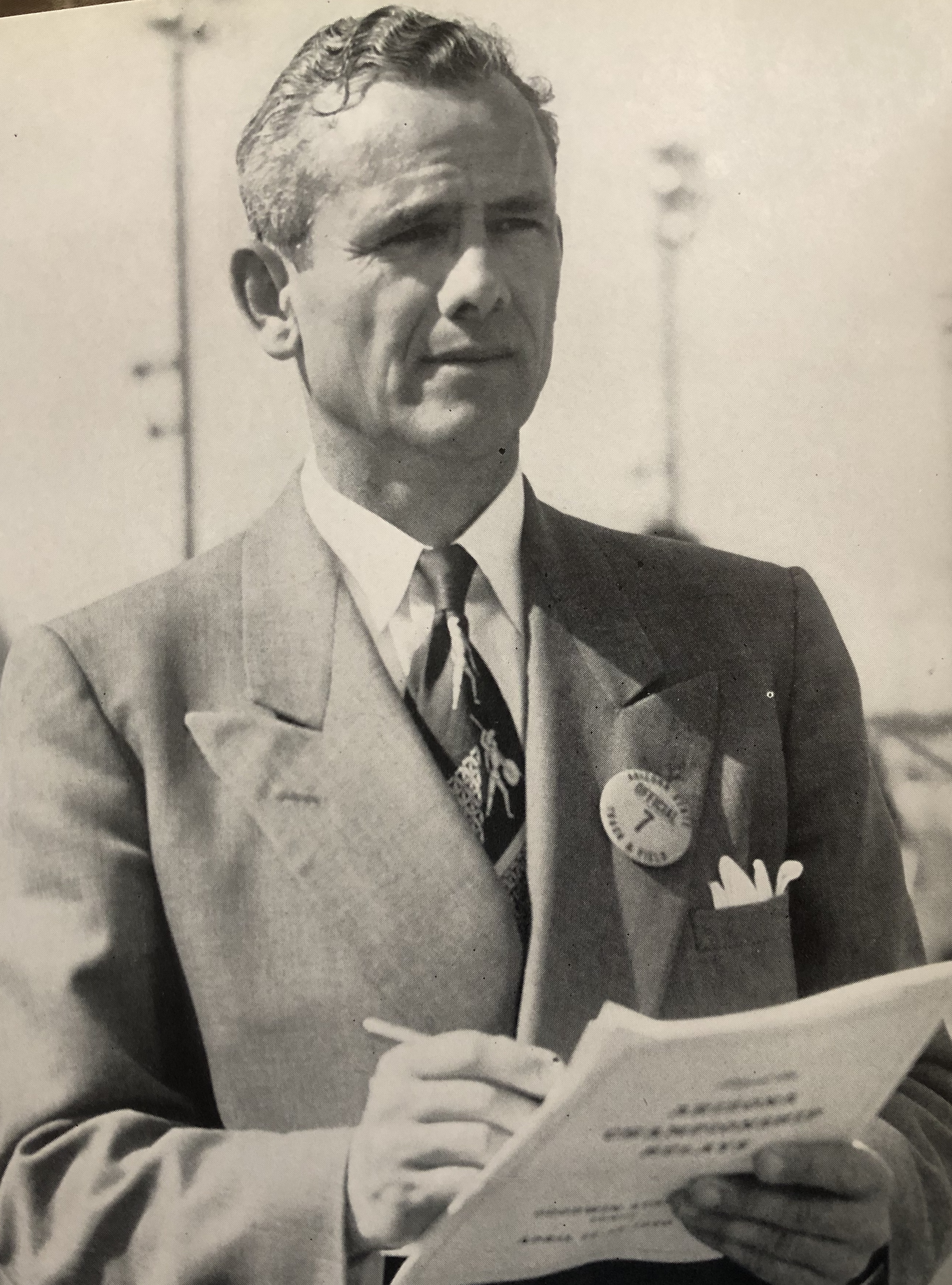
- Hill at USC, c. 1950

Biographical details
- Born: January 20, 1907; Yates, Missouri, U.S.
- Died: August 1, 1993 (aged 86); Pasadena, California, U.S.

Playing career

Football
- 1925–1926: Riverside
- 1928–1929: USC

Basketball
- 1925–1927: Riverside

Baseball
- 1926: Riverside
- 1930: USC
- 1930–1931: Hollywood Stars
- 1932: Newark Bears
- 1933: St. Paul Saints
- 1934: Newark Bears
- 1935: New York Yankees
- 1936–1937: Washington Senators
- 1937: Philadelphia Athletics
- 1938–1939: Oakland Oaks
- Positions: Fullback, halfback (football); Outfielder (baseball)

Coaching career (HC unless noted)

Football
- 1930–1933: Riverside (co-HC)
- 1934–1939: Corona HS (CA)
- 1940–1941: Long Beach
- 1946–1948: USC (assistant)
- 1951–1956: USC

Baseball
- 1933–1934: Riverside

Track and field
- 1940–1942: Long Beach
- 1949–1950: USC
- 1962: USC (interim HC)

Administrative career (AD unless noted)
- 1957–1972: USC

Head coaching record
- Overall: 45–17–1 (college football); 21–14 (junior college baseball)
- Bowls: 1–1

Accomplishments and honors

Championships
- Football; 1 PCC (1952)

Jesse Terrill Hill (January 20, 1907 – August 31, 1993) was an American athlete, coach, and college athletics administrator who was best known for his tenure as a coach and athletic director at the University of Southern California (USC). His career spanned six decades. He played as an outfielder in Major League Baseball from 1935 to 1937, coached two national championship teams in track and field, and went on to become the first person to both play for and coach Rose Bowl champions.

== Early life and collegiate athletic career ==
Hill was born in Yates, Missouri and moved with his family to Corona, California as a boy, attending Corona High School and Riverside Junior College—now known as Riverside City College. After transferring to USC, he earned letters in football, track, and baseball. He played as a fullback for the 1928 USC football team, which won a national championship, and was a senior on the 1929 team that won the 1930 Rose Bowl, leading the Pacific Coast Conference with an average of 8.2 yards per carry. As a junior, he won the national title in the broad jump at the IC4A meet on June 1, 1929 at Franklin Field in Philadelphia, with a jump of 25 feet 7/8 inch, breaking the intercollegiate record by 2½ inches. He also won a baseball conference batting championship with a .389 average as a senior in 1930. He was a member of Sigma Nu Fraternity.

== Career as a professional athlete ==
After graduation, Hill signed a baseball contract with the Hollywood Stars of the Pacific Coast League, and hit a home run against the crosstown Los Angeles Angels in his first professional at bat. His contract was sold to the New York Yankees in January 1932, and he reached the major leagues as a left fielder in 1935, batting .293 in 107 games. On September 22 of his rookie year, he barely lost to Ben Chapman in a 75-yard promotional race held before a game with the Boston Red Sox. In January 1936 he was traded to the Washington Senators, and he hit .305 in a reserve role. After beginning 1937 with a .217 average in 33 games, and switching to center field, he was sent to the Philadelphia Athletics, and hit .293 over the rest of the year. Afterwards he was sent to the Oakland Oaks of the PCL, where he played two more years. Over his major league career, Hill batted .289 with 6 home runs, 175 runs, 108 runs batted in, 277 hits and 43 stolen bases.

== Coaching career ==
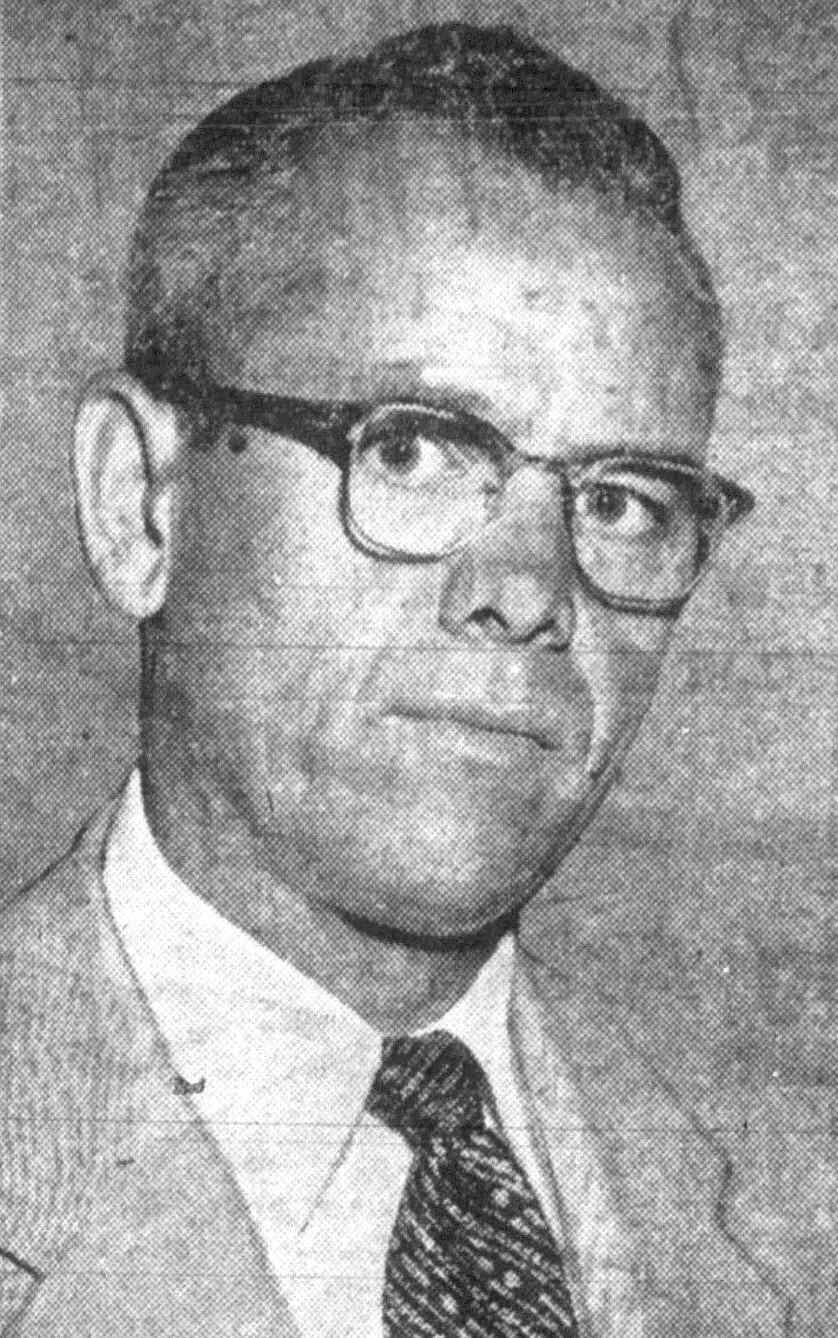
Hill, c. 1953

Hill began his coaching career at California high schools and colleges during baseball off-seasons. He was the co-head football coach with Jess Mortensen at Riverside Junior College from 1930 to 1933. From 1934 to 1939, he was the head football coach at Corona High School. In 1940, he was hired as the head football and track coach at Long Beach Junior College—now known as Long Beach City College (LBCC)–in Long Beach, California, for an annual salary of $2,400.

Hill left Long Beach in early 1942 when he was appointed as a lieutenant (junior grade) in the United States Navy. During World War II, he worked with USC athletic director Willis O. Hunter in the Navy's V-5 (aviation cadet) program, and Hunter hired him in 1946 to coach freshman football and track. Hill was an assistant coach on USC's 1947 Rose Bowl team.

Hill became USC's head track coach in 1949 and 1950, succeeding Dean Cromwell, and won national titles in both years. He returned for one season as track coach in 1962 after the sudden death of Jess Mortensen. Hill served as USC's head football coach from 1951 to 1956, with his teams posting a record of 45–17–1, including Rose Bowl appearances after the 1952 and 1954 seasons. His 1952 squad finished the year ranked fifth in the nation with a 10–1 record, outscoring their opponents 254–47 and leading the nation in scoring defense at 4.7 points per game; the only loss was a 9–0 contest at Notre Dame, which ended the regular season. In the 1953 Rose Bowl, USC defeated Wisconsin 9–0; it was the only time between 1947 and 1959 that the Pacific Coast Conference (PCC) champion beat the Big Ten Conference champion. Hill's 1954 team lost the 1955 Rose Bowl to Ohio State, 20–7. During his tenure, Hill's players included Frank Gifford, Rudy Bukich, Jim Sears and Jon Arnett. For the 1956 season opener at Texas, Hill made the decision to change hotels after discovering that USC's integrated team could not stay at the segregated Austin hotel that had been booked; USC went on to win the game, 44–20, as fullback C. R. Roberts, an African American, ran for a school-record 251 yards. USC ended the year with wins over UCLA and Notre Dame, the only time in his six years that they won both games.

== Athletic director ==
Hill stepped down from his football post to become USC's athletic director from 1957 to 1972, during which period the university won 29 team national championships: eight tennis titles (1958, 1962–64, 1966–69) under coach George Toley; six College World Series titles (1958, 1961, 1963, 1968, 1970–71) under coach Rod Dedeaux; six track titles (1958, 1961, 1963, 1965, 1967–68) under coaches Jess Mortensen and Vern Wolfe; five swimming titles (1960, 1963–66) under coach Peter Daland; two football titles (1962, 1967) under coach John McKay; one indoor track title (1967) under coach Vern Wolfe; and one gymnastics title (1962) under coach Jack Beckner. Hill then became commissioner of the Pacific Coast Athletic Association, retiring in 1978.

== Death, family, and honors ==
Hill died at age 86 in Pasadena, California, of complications of Alzheimer's disease and buried at the Sunnyslope Cemetery in Corona. He had one daughter and one son, and grandchildren.

Hill was inducted into the USC Athletic Hall of Fame in its second class in 1995.

== Head coaching record ==
=== College football ===
Year	Team	Overall	Conference	Standing	Bowl/playoffs	Coaches^{#}	AP^{°}
USC Trojans (Pacific Coast Conference) (1951–1956)
1951	USC	7–3	4–2	4th			
1952	USC	10–1	6–0	1st	W Rose	4	5
1953	USC	6–3–1	4–2–1	3rd			
1954	USC	8–4	6–1	2nd	L Rose	11	17
1955	USC	6–4	3–3	6th		12	13
1956	USC	8–2	5–2	T–2nd		15	18
USC:		45–17–1	28–10–1				
Total:		45–17–1					
National championship Conference title Conference division title or championship game berth
^{#}Rankings from final Coaches Poll.; ^{°}Rankings from final AP Poll.
