= 1954 Washington Huskies football team =

American college football season

1954 Washington Huskies football
- Conference: Pacific Coast Conference
- Record: 2–8 (1–6 PCC)
- Head coach: John Cherberg (2nd season)
- Captain: Stewart Crook
- Home stadium: University of Washington Stadium

1954 Pacific Coast Conference football standings
	Conf.					Overall
Team	W		L		T	W		L		T
No. 2 UCLA $	6	–	0	–	0	9	–	0	–	0
No. 17 USC ^	6	–	1	–	0	8	–	4	–	0
Oregon	5	–	3	–	0	6	–	4	–	0
California	4	–	3	–	0	5	–	5	–	0
Washington State	3	–	4	–	0	4	–	6	–	0
Stanford	2	–	4	–	0	4	–	6	–	0
Idaho	1	–	2	–	0	4	–	5	–	0
Washington	1	–	6	–	0	2	–	8	–	0
Oregon State	1	–	6	–	0	1	–	8	–	0
$ – Conference champion; ^ – Selected as Rose Bowl representative UCLA won rivalry game over USC, but no-repeat rule was in effect; Rankings from AP Poll

The 1954 Washington Huskies football team was an American football team that represented the University of Washington during the 1954 college football season. In its second season under head coach John Cherberg, the team compiled a 2–8 record, finished in a tie for last place in the Pacific Coast Conference, and was outscored by its opponents 215 to 78. Stewart Crook was the team captain.

== Schedule ==
Date	Opponent	Site	Result	Attendance	Source
September 18	Utah*	University of Washington Stadium; Seattle, WA	W 7–6	25,754	
September 25	Michigan*	University of Washington Stadium; Seattle, WA	L 0–14	41,300	
October 2	at Oregon State	Multnomah Stadium; Portland, OR	W 17–7	19,667	
October 9	No. 2 UCLA	University of Washington Stadium; Seattle, WA	L 20–21	35,700	
October 16	at Baylor*	Baylor Stadium; Waco, TX	L 7–34	22,000	
October 23	at Stanford	Stanford Stadium; Stanford, CA	L 7–13	17,000	
October 30	Oregon	University of Washington Stadium; Seattle, WA (rivalry)	L 7–26	38,300	
November 6	California^{†}	University of Washington Stadium; Seattle, WA	L 6–27	36,500	
November 13	at No. 8 USC	Los Angeles Memorial Coliseum; Los Angeles, CA	L 0–41	36,108	
November 20	at Washington State	Rogers Field; Pullman, WA (rivalry)	L 7–26	18,000	
*Non-conference game; ^{†}Homecoming; Rankings from AP Poll released prior to the game; Source:

== NFL draft selections ==
One University of Washington Husky was selected in the 1955 NFL draft, which lasted 30 rounds with 360 selections.

= Husky Hall of Fame

Player	Position	Round	Pick	NFL club
Fred Robinson	Guard	14th	169	Cleveland Browns
