= Bob Davenport (gridiron football) =

American gridiron football player and coach (1933–2024)

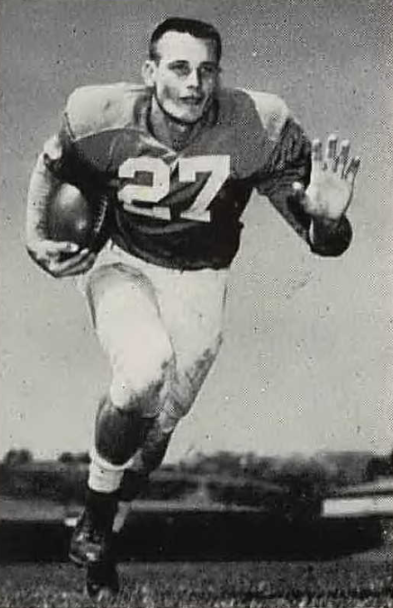
- Davenport from 1954 Southern Campus

Profile
- Position: Fullback

Personal information
- Born: April 30, 1933; Oakley, Kansas, U.S.
- Died: July 3, 2024 (aged 91); Upland, Indiana, U.S.

Career information
- College: UCLA
- NFL draft: 1956: 25th round, 301st overall pick

Career history

Playing
- Winnipeg Blue Bombers (1956–1957)

Coaching
- Taylor University (1958–1968)

Awards and highlights
- National champion (1954); 2× First-team All-American (1954, 1955); Pop Warner Trophy (1955); 2× First-team All-PCC (1954, 1955); Second-team All-PCC (1953)

Bob Davenport (April 30, 1933 – July 3, 2024) was an American football player and coach.

== Biography ==
Davenport was raised in Long Beach, California, and played college football at the fullback position for the UCLA Bruins football team. He was selected by the Football Writers Association of America as a first-team player on its 1954 College Football All-America Team.

Davenport declined an offer from the Cleveland Browns as they held Sunday sporting events that contradicted his Christian commitment to observing the Lord's Day. He instead played professionally with the Winnipeg Blue Bombers of the Western Interprovincial Football Union—a forerunner of the Canadian Football League (CFL)—in 1956 and 1957.

Davenport served as the head football coach at Taylor University in Upland, Indiana from 1958 to 1968. He led the Taylor Trojans to four consecutive Hoosier Conference titles, from 1961 to 1964. In 1969, he was appointed to the new-created position of director of university-church leadership training at Taylor.

Davenport later became a competitive cycler. He died in Upland, Indiana on July 3, 2024, at the age of 91.

== Head coaching record ==
Year	Team	Overall	Conference	Standing	Bowl/playoffs
Taylor Trojans (Hoosier Conference) (1957–1968)
1958	Taylor	3–6	2–3	T–3rd	
1959	Taylor	6–3	3–2	T–2nd	
1960	Taylor	2–7	0–5	6th	
1961	Taylor	8–1	4–1	T–1st	
1962	Taylor	6–3	5–0	1st	
1963	Taylor	5–2–1	4–0–1	1st	
1964	Taylor	5–4	5–0	1st	
1965	Taylor	3–5–1	3–1–1	2nd	
1966	Taylor	5–3	3–2	T–3rd	
1967	Taylor	7–2	5–1	2nd	
1968	Taylor	3–5–1	2–4	5th	
Taylor:		53–41–3	36–19–2		
Total:		53–41–3			
National championship Conference title Conference division title or championship game berth
