= Bob Long (linebacker) =

American football player (born 1934)

No. 89, 86, 84, 56
- Position: Linebacker

Personal information
- Born: February 24, 1934; South Pasadena, California, U.S.
- Died: August 29, 2026 (aged 92); Frankston, Texas, U.S.
- Listed height: 6 ft 2 in (1.88 m)
- Listed weight: 240 lb (109 kg)

Career information
- High school: South Pasadena
- College: UCLA
- NFL draft: 1955: 2nd round, 18th overall pick

Career history
- Los Angeles Rams (1955); Detroit Lions (1955–1959); Cleveland Browns (1960)*; Los Angeles Rams (1960–1961); Dallas Cowboys (1962)
- * Offseason or practice squad member only

Awards and highlights
- NFL champion (1957); National champion (1954); First-team All-PCC (1954)

Career NFL statistics
- Interceptions: 7
- Fumble recoveries: 10
- Stats at Pro Football Reference

Robert Wendell Long (February 24, 1934 – August 29, 2026) was an American former professional football player who was a linebacker in the National Football League (NFL) for the Los Angeles Rams, Detroit Lions and Dallas Cowboys. He played college football for the UCLA Bruins.

== Early life ==
Long attended South Pasadena High School, before moving on to the University of California, Los Angeles. In 1954, he was a part of the team that shared the national championship with Ohio State University.

== Professional career ==
=== Los Angeles Rams ===
Long was selected by the Los Angeles Rams in the second round (18th overall) of the 1955 NFL draft. On October 2, he was traded to the Detroit Lions in exchange for a draft choice.

=== Detroit Lions ===
The Lions converted Long from a defensive end into a linebacker. In 1957, he was a starter at linebacker for the NFL Championship winning team. On July 20, 1960, he was traded along with a first round draft choice (#10-Bobby Crespino), to the Cleveland Browns in exchange for quarterback Jim Ninowski.

=== Cleveland Browns ===
On August 17, 1960, he was traded to the Los Angeles Rams in exchange for offensive end Leon Clarke.

=== Los Angeles Rams ===
In 1960, he played in 9 games. In 1961, he played in 13 games. He was released on September 4, 1962. On September 7, he was traded to the Dallas Cowboys along with defensive tackle John Meyers, in exchange for a third round draft choice (#32-Willie Brown).

=== Dallas Cowboys ===
In 1962, he was a backup linebacker, appearing in 8 games.

== Personal life ==
In 1983, he was an assistant football coach at Kansas State University.

He died on August 29, 2026 at the age of 92.
