= Lindon Crow =

American football player (1933–2018)

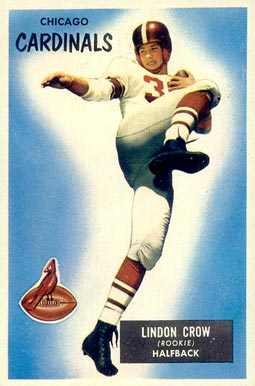
- Crow on a 1955 Bowman football card

No. 40, 41
- Position: Defensive back

Personal information
- Born: April 4, 1933; Denison, Texas, U.S.
- Died: October 25, 2018 (aged 85); Exeter, California, U.S.
- Listed height: 6 ft 1 in (1.85 m)
- Listed weight: 195 lb (88 kg)

Career information
- College: USC (1952–1954)
- NFL draft: 1955: 2nd round, 14th overall pick

Career history

Playing
- Chicago Cardinals (1955–1957); New York Giants (1958–1960); Los Angeles Rams (1961–1964)

Coaching
- Los Angeles Rams (1963–1964) Defensive backs coach

Awards and highlights
- Second-team All-Pro (1956); 3× Pro Bowl (1956-1957, 1959); 2× First-team All-PCC (1952, 1954)

Career NFL statistics
- Interceptions: 38
- Fumble recoveries: 9
- Total touchdowns: 3
- Stats at Pro Football Reference

Lindon Oscar Crow (April 4, 1933 – October 25, 2018) was an American professional football player who was a cornerback in the National Football League (NFL). He played college football for the USC Trojans. He was named to three Pro Bowls in the NFL.

== Early life ==
Crow was born on April 4, 1933, in Denison, Texas. He attended Corcoran High School in Corcoran, California. He played on the school's football team, on which he was the star running back at fullback. Crow was an All-Sierra League football player and unanimous first-team All-County selection. As a senior in 1950, he had a 109-yard run for a touchdown against Dinuba High School.

He was also a member of the basketball team, on which he played center; and the track team. He led Corcoran's track team running the 100-yard dash, 220-yard dash and 880-yard relay, throwing the shot put and as a broad jumper. In one three school track meet as a senior in March 1951, he won the 100- and 220-yard dashes, and broad jump; was on the winning relay team; and came in second throwing the shot put.

== College career ==
Crow played college football at the University of Southern California, where he played on the varsity team from 1952 to 1954. He was a two-way player, at running back and defensive back. As a sophomore, he had 78 yards in 14 rushing attempts, with one rushing touchdown; and 56 yards on three receptions, with two more touchdowns. He also had six interceptions as a defensive back.

In 1952, USC had a 10–1 overall record, including a 7–0 victory over Wisconsin in the January 1, 1953 Rose Bowl. USC finished the season ranked fifth by the Associated Press (AP). Playing starting safety in the Rose Bowl, Crow had missed a tackle that almost resulted in Heisman Trophy winner Alan Ameche scoring a touchdown, but Crow also had a key interception on USC's seven-yard line in preserving the victory. Sportswriter Bob Hunter reported Crow's defense prevented at least four Wisconsin touchdowns.

As a junior in 1953, Crow rushed for 235 yards in 49 attempts (4.8 yards per carry) with one touchdown, and had three receptions for 82 yards and another touchdown. He was limited by an ankle injury that year. As a senior in 1954, he rushed for 353 yards in 83 attempts, with three touchdowns; and had seven receptions for 270 yards and an extraordinary 39.1 yards per catch average, with three receiving touchdowns. USC played in the Rose Bowl again in 1955, but lost to Ohio State, 20–7. Crow had an interception in that game.

Crow was first-team All-Pacific Coast Conference (PCC) in 1952 at defensive back, and first-team All-PCC in 1954 at running back. He was selected USC's team captain as a senior in 1954. In 1955, he was selected to play in the Senior Bowl and the Chicago College All-Star Game.

Over his career as an offensive back, Crow had 666 rushing yards in 149 attempts (4.5 yards per carry), and 412 yards on 13 receptions (31.7 yards per catch), with 11 total touchdowns. As a defensive back, he had 11 interceptions during his USC career.

== Professional career ==
The Chicago Cardinals selected Crow with the first pick in the second round of the 1955 NFL draft, 14th overall. During his 10-year NFL career as a defensive back, Crow spent three years with the Cardinals, three with the New York Giants, and four with the Los Angeles Rams.

=== Chicago Cardinals ===
As a rookie in 1955, Crow started all 12 games as a right defensive halfback (cornerback). The left cornerback was future Hall of Famer Dick "Night Train" Lane. Crow had three interceptions as a rookie.

In 1956, the Cardinals defensive backfield of Lane, Crow, Jim Hill and Julian Spence was described as the fastest in NFL history. In 1956, Crow led the NFL with 11 interceptions (in a 12-game season). He was selected to play in the Pro Bowl, and was named second-team All-Pro by the Associated Press (AP). Lane, who had seven interceptions, was also named to the Pro Bowl and was selected first-team All Pro by the AP. The Cardinals improved their record from 4–7–1 in 1955, to 7–5 in 1956.

In 1957, the Cardinals switched Crow to free safety and Hill to left cornerback. Crow only had one interception, but was selected to the Pro Bowl for a second consecutive season. The team's record fell to 3–9.

=== New York Giants ===
In May 1958, the Cardinals traded Crow and kicker Pat Summerall (more renowned as a future Hall of Fame broadcaster) for defensive back Dick Nolan and rookie halfback Bobby Joe Conrad. Crow started 10 games at left cornerback in 1958, with Carl Karilivacz at right cornerback. Crow had three interceptions and one fumble recovery that season.

The 1958 Giants were 9–3, and played the Baltimore Colts for the 1958 NFL Championship, in what came to be known as "The Greatest Game Ever Played". The Giants lost to the Colts in sudden death overtime, 23–17. In that game, Crow intercepted a pass thrown by legendary Hall of Fame quarterback Johnny Unitas. Crow had pass interference called against him while trying to defend Hall of Fame runner and receiver Lenny Moore; but also broke up a potential 60-yard touchdown pass to Moore in overtime.

Crow started all 12 Giants' games in 1959, but at right cornerback. He was once again selected to play in the Pro Bowl. Dick Lynch played left cornerback, and Dick Nolan returned to the team, playing free safety. Crow, Nolan and strong safety Jimmy Patton all tied for the team lead with five interceptions.

The Giants had a 10–2 record, and went to the 1959 NFL Championship game. They faced the Colts again, this time losing 31–16. Crow once again was faced with covering Moore, and gave up a 60-yard touchdown pass from Unitas to Moore in the first quarter. Moore beat Crow and Nolan on the play.

In 1960, Crow again started all 12 games, returning to left cornerback, with Lynch moving to right cornerback. Crow had three interceptions. The Giants were 6–4–2. He returned a fumble 65 yards for a touchdown in an October 30 game against his former team, now the St. Louis Cardinals.

=== Los Angeles Rams ===
In early 1961, Los Angeles Rams general manager Elroy Hirsch was interested in trading for Crow. Within a month, a three-way deal brought Crow to Los Angeles. The Rams traded disgruntled quarterback Bill Wade to the Chicago Bears for defensive back Erich Barnes, and then immediately traded Barnes to the Giants for Crow. The Rams also received draft picks.

Crow began his career with the Rams at right cornerback, but was switched to safety by coach Bob Waterfield because of his good pass defense. He had six interceptions that season – in which the NFL expanded its schedule to 14 games – the second most in his career for a season. He was the Rams starting strong safety in 1962 and 1963, under first time NFL head coach Harland Svare, starting 27 of the 28 games in which he appeared.

Crow had five interceptions in 1962. The Rams were 0–6 going into their October 28 game against the 3–3 San Francisco 49ers, in San Francisco. Crow helped the team to a victory when he intercepted a John Brodie pass in the first quarter and returned it 65 yards for a touchdown. This was the Rams only win in 1962, going 1–12–1.

The Rams improved to 5–9 the following season. Crow did not have an interception, but did have a fumble recovery and a safety. Crow tackled Detroit Lions' running back Larry Ferguson for a safety in the first game of the 1963 season, for the Rams only points in a 23–2 loss. Ferguson only carried the ball 12 other times in his seven-game NFL career.

The Rams began the 1964 season 2–2–1. In 1963 or 1964, Svare had made Crow a player-coach (coaching defensive backs). Before the season's sixth game against the San Francisco 49ers, Svare made rookie Aaron Martin a starter at cornerback and moved third-year cornerback Bobby Smith into Crowe's starting safety position to get more speed in the defensive backfield, and to pursue his program of using rookies and young players. In Smith's first game replacing Crow, he intercepted a pass and returned it 97 yards for a touchdown, in a 42–14 win over the 49ers on October 18. The Rams secondary intercepted a total of seven passes in the game, and broke an NFL record by returning them for 314 yards.

After the 49ers game, however, the Rams went 2–5–1, finishing the season 5–7–2. Crow played in nine games that year, starting only six. Svare moved Crowe to linebacker for some of his starts. The Rams released Crowe in June 1965, and he did not play again in the NFL.

Crow finished his career with 38 interceptions, which he returned for 512 yards and two touchdowns. He also recovered 9 fumbles, returning them for 65 yards and a score. On special teams, he returned 25 punts for 134 yards.

== Coaching career ==
In addition to coaching defensive backs under Svare, Crow was the defensive coordinator at California State University, Northridge from 1972 to 1975. He was head coach of St. Genevieve High School in Panorama City, California from 1976 to 1988, also serving as athletic director over his last four years there.

== Personal life and death ==
He was married to his wife Sandy for 47 years at the time of his death. Crow died on October 25, 2018, in Exeter, California, at the age of 85. He had suffered a series of strokes. He was survived by his wife, three children, six grandchildren and nine great-grandchildren.
