= 1954 UCLA Bruins football team =

American college football season

1954 UCLA Bruins football

Coaches' Poll national champion FWAA national champion PCC champion
- Conference: Pacific Coast Conference

Ranking
- Coaches: No. 1
- AP: No. 2
- Record: 9–0 (6–0 PCC)
- Head coach: Red Sanders (6th season)
- Offensive scheme: Single-wing
- Home stadium: Los Angeles Memorial Coliseum

1954 Pacific Coast Conference football standings
	Conf.					Overall
Team	W		L		T	W		L		T
No. 2 UCLA $	6	–	0	–	0	9	–	0	–	0
No. 17 USC ^	6	–	1	–	0	8	–	4	–	0
Oregon	5	–	3	–	0	6	–	4	–	0
California	4	–	3	–	0	5	–	5	–	0
Washington State	3	–	4	–	0	4	–	6	–	0
Stanford	2	–	4	–	0	4	–	6	–	0
Idaho	1	–	2	–	0	4	–	5	–	0
Washington	1	–	6	–	0	2	–	8	–	0
Oregon State	1	–	6	–	0	1	–	8	–	0
$ – Conference champion; ^ – Selected as Rose Bowl representative UCLA won rivalry game over USC, but no-repeat rule was in effect; Rankings from AP Poll

The 1954 UCLA Bruins football team was an American football team that represented the University of California, Los Angeles (UCLA) in the Pacific Coast Conference during the 1954 college football season. They played their home games at the Los Angeles Memorial Coliseum and were coached by Red Sanders. It was Sanders' sixth season as the UCLA head coach; the Bruins finished 9–0 overall, and were Pacific Coast Conference Champions with a 6–0 record. In nine games, UCLA outscored their opponents 367 to 40.

The Bruins were not eligible to play in the Rose Bowl vs. Ohio State (ranked No. 1 in the AP poll) because of the PCC's "no repeat" rule, in effect for most of the decade, after California lost a third straight Rose Bowl in January 1951. Since UCLA had played in the 1954 Rose Bowl, they were excluded from the 1955 event. The game likely would have made for a de facto national championship game, but thus, rival USC (whom the Bruins soundly defeated 34–0) went instead, and lost 20–7 to Ohio State. Following the outcome, UCLA and Ohio State split the national championship.

UCLA was selected national champion by NCAA-designated major selectors of Dunkel, Football Writers Association of America (FWAA), Litkenhous, National Championship Foundation, and United Press International (Coaches Poll), and co-champion by both Football Research and Helms. This consensus national championship is claimed by the school. Ohio State was selected national champion by the AP poll among other selectors.

During the season, the Bruins debuted their powder blue uniforms, referred to as "powder-keg blue" by head coach Sanders, that featured two white stripes around the shoulders. The white uniforms with blue stripes were used the previous season during the game against USC but this was the earliest known instance of the stripes becoming a regular part of the UCLA uniform.

== Schedule ==
Date	Time	Opponent	Rank	Site	Result	Attendance	Source
September 18	8:30 p.m.	San Diego NTC*	No. 8	Los Angeles Memorial Coliseum; Los Angeles, CA	W 67–0	24,793	
September 25	1:00 p.m.	at Kansas*	No. 8	Memorial Stadium; Lawrence, KS	W 32–7	25,000	
October 1	8:30 p.m.	No. 6 Maryland*	No. 4	Los Angeles Memorial Coliseum; Los Angeles, CA	W 12–7	73,376	
October 9	2:00 p.m.	at Washington	No. 2	Husky Stadium; Seattle, WA	W 21–20	35,678	
October 16	2:00 p.m.	Stanford	No. 3	Los Angeles Memorial Coliseum; Los Angeles, CA	W 72–0	70,555	
October 23	1:30 p.m.	at Oregon State	No. 3	Parker Stadium; Corvallis, OR	W 61–0	8,500	
October 30	2:00 p.m.	at California	No. 3	California Memorial Stadium; Berkeley, CA	W 27–6	65,000	
November 6	2:00 p.m.	Oregon	No. 1	Los Angeles Memorial Coliseum; Los Angeles, CA	W 41–0	46,435	
November 20	2:00 p.m.	No. 7 USC	No. 2	Los Angeles Memorial Coliseum; Los Angeles, CA	W 34–0	102,548	
*Non-conference game; Rankings from AP Poll released prior to the game; All times are in Pacific time

== Rankings ==
Ranking movements Legend: ██ Increase in ranking ██ Decrease in ranking ( ) = First-place votes
	Week											
Poll	Pre	1	2	3	4	5	6	7	8	9	10	Final
AP	8 (1)	8 (2)	4 (3)	2 (20)	3 (10)	3 (23)	3 (45)	1 (72)	1 (117)	2 (92)	2 (85)	2 (133)
Coaches	Not released		4 (1)	2 (5)	3 (2)	3 (6)	1 (8)	1 (19)	1 (26)	1 (23)	1 (22)	1 (21)

== Game summaries ==
=== San Diego Navy ===
San Diego Navy at UCLA

Team	1	2	3	4	Total
San Diego Navy	0	0	0	0	0
• Bruins	13	27	7	20	67

- Date: September 18, 1954
- Location: Los Angeles Memorial Coliseum
  Los Angeles, CA
- Game start: 8:30 pm PST
- Game attendance: 24,793
- Game weather: Temperature: 72 °F (22 °C) • Weather: Clear

Scoring summary
1	3:40	UCLA	Primo Villanueva 3-yard run	UCLA 6–0
1	6:53	UCLA	Primo Villanueva 9-yard run (Doug Bradley Kick)	UCLA 13–0
2	4:48	UCLA	Bruce Ballard 20-yard run (Sam Brown Kick)	UCLA 20–0
2	8:45	UCLA	Sam Brown 2-yard run (Sam Brown Kick)	UCLA 27–0
2	11:36	UCLA	Primo Villanueva 11-yard run (Doug Bradley Kick)	UCLA 34–0
2	13:19	UCLA	Bob Davenport 9-yard run	UCLA 40–0
3	5:21	UCLA	Bob Davenport 1-yard run (Doug Bradley Kick)	UCLA 47–0
4	0:04	UCLA	Gerry McDougal 1-yard run	UCLA 54–0
4	4:15	UCLA	Ronnie Loudd 4-yard pass from Gerry McDougal (Doug Bradley Kick)	UCLA 61–0
4	7:10	UCLA	Doug Peters 2-yard run	UCLA 67–0

The Bruins had originally scheduled Santa Clara to open their season but after the Broncos suspended football, the San Diego Naval Training Center was scheduled as a replacement. Although the San Diego NTC featured players such as All-American Bucky Curtis from Vanderbilt and All-PCC Earl Stelle from Oregon, UCLA was favored three touchdowns.

Primo Villanueva scored the first two touchdowns of the game and the Bruins led 13–0 within 7 minutes. Bruce Ballard, Sam Brown, Villaneuva, and Bob Davenport would each score another running touchdown giving the Bruins a 40–0 halftime lead. Davenport, Gerry McDougall, and Doug Peters would each score three more running touchdowns and Ronnie Loudd would score a passing touchdown from Gerry McDougal to give UCLA a punishing 67–0 victory.

=== Kansas ===
UCLA at Kansas

Team	1	2	3	4	Total
• Bruins	18	0	0	14	32
Jayhawks	0	7	0	0	7

- Date: September 25, 1954
- Location: Memorial Stadium
  Lawrence, KS
- Game start: 4:00 p.m. CST
- Game attendance: 25,000

Scoring summary
1	4:27	UCLA	Bob Davenport 1-yard run	UCLA 6–0
1	8:45	UCLA	Jim Decker 18-yard run	UCLA 12–0
1	13:19	UCLA	Doug Bradley 3-yard run	UCLA 18–0
2	13:36	KU	Ralph Moody 82-yard punt return (Reich Kick)	UCLA 18–7
4	3:31	UCLA	Jack Ellena 50-yard punt return (Doug Bradley Kick)	UCLA 25–7
4	14:08	UCLA	Gerry McDougall 9-yard run (Sam Brown Kick)	UCLA 32–7

The Bruins scored three consecutive touchdowns in the first quarter. Kansas player Ralph Moody scored the first Kansas touchdown on an 82-yard punt return. Jack Ellena would score on a 50-yard punt return in the fourth quarter. A 73-yard run by reserve fullback Don Shinnick down to the 9-yard line would set up Gerry McDougall for UCLA's final score of the day.

=== Maryland ===
Maryland at UCLA

Team	1	2	3	4	Total
Terrapins	0	0	0	7	7
• Bruins	6	0	0	6	12

- Date: October 1, 1954
- Location: Los Angeles Memorial Coliseum
  Los Angeles, CA
- Game start: 8:30 pm PST
- Game attendance: 73,376
- Game weather: Temperature: 68 °F (20 °C) • Weather: Clear

Scoring summary
1	7:42	UCLA	Bob Davenport 3-yard run	UCLA 6–0
4	0:38	Maryland	Dare 11-yard pass from Boxold (Bielski Kick)	Maryland 7–6
4	8:24	UCLA	Bob Davenport 1-yard run	UCLA 12–7

Maryland were the 1953 national champions. Bob Davenport gained 89 yard on 23 carries and scored both of UCLA's touchdowns. Maryland's Howard Dare scored a touchdown on a pass from Charley Boxold to give the Terrapins the lead early in the fourth quarter. Davenport scored the go ahead touchdown in the middle of the fourth quarter to give the Bruins the victory.

=== Washington ===
UCLA at Washington

Team	1	2	3	4	Total
• Bruins	7	0	14	0	21
Huskies	0	0	7	13	20

- Date: October 9, 1954
- Location: Husky Stadium
  Seattle, WA
- Game start: 2:00 p.m. PST
- Game attendance: 35,700
- Game weather: Weather: Warm-Overcast
- Referee: Jack L. Sprenger, Melvin W. Nicherson, Ted T. Fehring, Albert A. Bodner, Rudolph E. Hansen, Fred L. Gali

Scoring summary
1	6:13	UCLA	Bob Davenport 6-yard run (Johnny Hermann Kick)	UCLA 7–0
3	2:43	UCLA	Bob Davenport 16-yard run (Johnny Hermann Kick)	UCLA 14–0
3	6:06	UCLA	Primo Villanueva 2-yard run (Bradley Kick)	UCLA 21–0
3	9:43	WASH	Dean Derby 33-yard pass from Bob Cox	UCLA 21–7
4	3:14	WASH	Corky Lewis 5-yard pass from Bob Cox	UCLA 21–13
4	12:34	WASH	Bud Green 9-yard pass from Bob Cox	UCLA 21–20

Bob Davenport scored two rushing touchdowns, Primo Villanueva scored one rushing touchdown, and Johnny Herman converted all three extra points to give UCLA a 21–0 led midway through the third quarter. After Bruins Coach Sanders replaced his starters with his second and third string players, Washington quarterback Bob Cox threw a passing touchdown to Dean Derby and Bob Dunn converted the extra point to reduce UCLA's lead to 21–7 at the end of the third quarter.

In the fourth quarter, Sam Brown fumbled which allowed Washington to recover at the UCLA 25. Cox threw another touchdown, this time to Corky Lewis but Dunn missed the extra point kick. Brown fumbled again for a 13-yard loss and Washington scored another passing touchdown on a 56-yard drive. Dunn's extra point reduced the UCLA lead to 21–20 with 2:30 minutes left. The Bruins would hold out to win the game.

=== Stanford ===
Stanford at UCLA

Team	1	2	3	4	Total
Indians	0	0	0	0	0
• Bruins	13	14	21	24	72

- Date: October 16, 1954
- Location: Los Angeles Memorial Coliseum
  Los Angeles, CA
- Game start: 2:00 p.m. PST
- Game attendance: 70,555
- Game weather: Temperature: 78 °F (26 °C) • Weather: Hot

Scoring summary
1	4:08	UCLA	Bob Davenport 27-yard run (Johnny Hermann Kick)	UCLA 7–0
1	14:25	UCLA	Jim Decker 64-yard run	UCLA 13–0
2	7:36	UCLA	Villanueva 11-yard run (S. Brown Kick)	UCLA 20–0
2	13:28	UCLA	Villanueva 5-yard run (S. Brown Kick)	UCLA 27–0
3	0:30	UCLA	Rommie Loudd 27-yard pass from Villanueva (Johnny Hermann PAT)	UCLA 34–0
3	8:33	UCLA	Bob Heydenfeldt Blocked Punt (Bradley Kick)	UCLA 41–0
3	10:33	UCLA	Doug Bradley 4-yard run (Bradley Kick)	UCLA 48–0
4	1:34	UCLA	Sam Brown 33-yard punt return	UCLA 54–0
4	6:54	UCLA	McDougall 6-yard run	UCLA 60–0
4	12:32	UCLA	Sam Brown 82-yard punt return	UCLA 66–0
4		UCLA	Bob Davenport 64-yard pass interception return	UCLA 72–0

The Bruin defense intercepted Stanford quarterbacks Jerry Gustafson and John Neff eight times and returned them for 210 total yards. Sam Brown set a new conference record for punt returns with 132 yards in three returns. Villanueva, Davenport and Brown each scored twice while Decker, Loudd, Heydenfeldt and McDougall scored once each for a total of 10 touchdowns.

=== Oregon State ===
UCLA at Oregon State

Team	1	2	3	4	Total
• Bruins	13	20	14	14	61
Beavers	0	0	0	0	0

- Date: October 23, 1954
- Location: Parker Stadium
  Corvallis, OR
- Game start: 1:30 p.m. PST
- Game attendance: 8,500
- Game weather: Weather: Fair

Scoring summary
1	2:27	UCLA	Bob Davenport 1-yard run (Johnny Hermann Kick)	UCLA 7–0
1	13:52	UCLA	Johnny Hermann 18-yard pass from Bradley	UCLA 13–0
2	6:35	UCLA	Primo Villanueva 2-yard run (Johnny Hermann Kick)	UCLA 20–0
2	8:36	UCLA	Sam Brown 62-yard punt return (Sam Brown Kick)	UCLA 27–0
2	10:26	UCLA	Doug Peters 21-yard run	UCLA 33–0
3	6:00	UCLA	Don Shinnick 1-yard run (McDougal Kick)	UCLA 40–0
3	12:35	UCLA	Russ Hampton 8-yard pass from McDougal (Bradley Kick)	UCLA 47–0
4	4:30	UCLA	Sam Brown 62-yard punt return	UCLA 54–0
4	11:00	UCLA	Clarence Norris 21-yard blocked kick (Sam Brown Kick)	UCLA 61–0

Sam Brown scored two touchdowns and Bob Davenport, Johnny Hermann, Primo Villanueva, Doug Peters, Don Shinnick, Russ Hampton, and Clarence Norris each scored a touchdown to give UCLA the 61–0 victory over Oregon State. The Bruins rushed for 498 yards and 593 total yards while holding Oregon State to 88 rushing yards and 111 total yards.

=== California ===
UCLA at California

Team	1	2	3	4	Total
• Bruins	7	7	0	13	27
Golden Bears	0	6	0	0	6

- Date: October 30, 1954
- Location: California Memorial Stadium
  Berkeley, CA
- Game start: 2:00 p.m. PST
- Game attendance: 64,000
- Game weather: Weather: Warm

Scoring summary
1	5:17	UCLA	Primo Villanueva 3-yard run (Johnny Hermann Kick)	UCLA 7–0
2	0:47	UCLA	Primo Villanueva 26-yard run (Sam Brown Kick)	UCLA 14–0
2	12:07	CAL	Williams 7-yard run	UCLA 14–6
4	0:05	UCLA	Bob Davenport 1-yard run (Johnny Hermann Kick)	UCLA 21–6
4	6:32	UCLA	Johnny Hermarnn 8-yard pass from Primo Villanueva	UCLA 27–6

Primo Villanueva rushed for two touchdowns in the first half and threw a touchdown pass to Johnny Hermann in the fourth. Cal's Paul Larson set new Bears record for passes (38), pass completions (25), and pass yards (280) and Williams scored the Bears' lone touchdown on a 7-yard run.

=== Oregon ===
Oregon at UCLA

Team	1	2	3	4	Total
Ducks	0	0	0	0	0
• Bruins	7	14	6	14	41

- Date: November 6, 1954
- Location:
  Los Angeles Memorial Coliseum
  Los Angeles, CA
- Game start: 2:00 pm PST
- Game attendance: 46,435
- Game weather: Temperature: 82 °F (28 °C) • Weather: Clear

Scoring summary
1	6:16	UCLA	Rommie Loudd 16-yard pass from Primo Villanueva (Johnny Hermann Kick)	UCLA 7–0
2	1:25	UCLA	Bob Davenport 4-yard run (Johnny Hermann Kick)	UCLA 14–0
2	13:10	UCLA	Jim Decker 91-yard run (Johnny Hermann Kick)	UCLA 21–0
3	5:32	UCLA	Rommie Loudd recovered blocked kick	UCLA 27–0
4	5:58	UCLA	Doug Bradley 1-yard run(Johnny Hermann Kick)	UCLA 34–0
4	14:06	UCLA	Sam Brown 5-yard run (Sam Brown Kick)	UCLA 41–0

With the victory, UCLA set a new single scoring record of 333 points, surpassing the previous record of 327 points in just 8 games. Rommie Loudd scored the first points of the game on a 16-yard pass from Primo Villanueva. Bob Davenport, Jim Decker, Doug Bradley, Sam Brown, and Rommie Loudd each scored rushing touchdowns. Oregon only moved passed the 50 yard line two and the UCLA defense limited George Shaw, the country's leading passer with 178 yard per game, to only 29 yards.

=== USC ===
USC at UCLA

Team	1	2	3	4	Total
Trojans	0	0	0	0	0
• Bruins	7	0	0	27	34

- Date: November 20, 1954
- Location:
  Los Angeles Memorial Coliseum
  Los Angeles, CA
- Game start: 2:00 p.m. PST
- Game attendance: 102,548
- Game weather: Temperature: 90 °F (32 °C) • Weather: Clear-Hot

Scoring summary
1	6:48	UCLA	Bob Heydenfeldt 48-yard pass from Primo Villanueva (Johnny Herman Kick)	UCLA 6–0
4	0:44	UCLA	Bob Davenport 1-yard plunge (Johnny Herman Kick)	UCLA 14–0
4	2:13	UCLA	Terry Debay 12-yard pass from Villanueva (Johnny Herman Kick)	UCLA 21–0
4	6:00	UCLA	Rommie Loudd 7-yard pass from Bradley (Johnny Herman Kick)	UCLA 28–0
4	14:13	UCLA	Bruce Ballard 48-yard pass from Brown (Johnny Herman Kick)	UCLA 34–0

A 48-yard pass from Primo Villanueva to Bob Heydenfeldt gave UCLA a 7–0 first quarter lead. The Bruins poured on with four touchdowns in the fourth quarter: Bob Davenport scored from the one-yard line, Villanueva passed to Terry Debay for a 12-yard touchdown, Rommie Loudd caught a pass from Doug Bradley for an 8-yard touchdown, and Sam Brown passed to Bruce Ballard for a 17-yard touchdown. USC had only 5 yards rushing.

== Personnel ==
=== Roster ===
1954 UCLA Bruins Football
Halfbacks: 12 Doug Bradley– Sophomore; 15 Sam Brown – Junior; 16 Gerry McDougall – Sophomore; 19 Primo Villanueva – Senior; 30 Jim Decker – Junior; 32 Bruce Ballard; 33 Johnny Hermann – Junior; Fullbacks: 26 Doug Peters – Junior; 27 Bob Davenport – Junior; 28 Don Shinnick – Sophomore; Quarterbacks: 40 Terry Debay – Senior; 44 Bob Bergdahl – Sophomore; 46 Gerry Okuneff – Senior	Centers: 50 John Peterson – Senior; 52 Jack McKay – Sophomore; 53 Steve Palmer – Junior; Guards: 60 Hardiman Cureton – Junior; 62 Tom Thaxter – Sophomore; 63 Jim Brown – Junior; 64 Jim Salsbury – Senior; 66 Mike Riskas; 67 Sam Boghosian – Senior; 69 Richard Braunbeck	Tackles: 71 Gil Moreno – Junior; 74 Preston Dills – Junior; 75 Warner Benjamin – Senior; 77 Jack Ellena – Senior; 78 Joe Ray – Senior; Ends: 81 Bob Long – Senior; 82 Rommie Loudd – Junior; 83 Bob Heydenfeldt – Senior; 84 Roger White - Junior; 85 Russ Hampton; 86 John Farhood; 90 Clarence Norris – Senior

=== Coaching staff ===
Henry "Red" Sanders returned to coach the Bruins for the sixth season. The Bruin coaching staff included four future college head coaches, including three (Barnes, Dickerson, and Prothro) who would eventually serve as UCLA head coaches.

Name	Position	Years at UCLA	Alma mater (year)
Henry "Red" Sanders	Head coach	6	Vanderbilt (1926)
William F. Barnes	Ends coach	5	Tennessee (1939)
Deke Brackett	Assistant coach	5	Tennessee (1933)
George W. Dickerson	Assistant line coach	8	UCLA (1936)
Jim Myers	Line coach	6	Tennessee (1946)
Tommy Prothro	Backfield coach	6	Duke (1941)
Johnny Johnson	Freshman coach	6	UCLA (1946)

== Statistics ==
=== Team ===
	UCLA	Opp
Points per game	40.8	4.4
First downs	151	95
Rushing	119	35
Passing	31	58
Penalty	1	2
Rushing yardage	2,578	659
Rushing attempts	454	314
Avg per rush	5.6	2.1
Avg per game	286.4	73.2
Passing yardage	721	1,049
Avg per game	80.1	116.6
Completions – attempts	52-107 (48.6%)	92-216 (42.6%)
Total offense	3,299	1,708
Total play	561	470
Avg per play	5.9	3.7
Avg per game	366.6	195.3
Fumbles lost	23–12	32–21

	UCLA	Opp
Punts – yards	40-1497 (37.4 avg)	57-1932 (33.9 avg)
Punt returns – total yards	32-588 (18.4 avg)	23-271 (11.8 avg)
Kick returns – total yards	16-323 (20.2 avg)	58-862 (14.9 avg)
Onside kicks		
Avg time of possession per game		
Penalties – yards	34-400	41-355
Avg per game	44.4	39.4
3rd down conversions		
4th down conversions		
Sacks By – yards		
Total TDs	45	6
Rushing	35	2
Passing	10	4
Field goals – attempts	0-0 (0%)	0-0 (0%)
PAT – attempts	37-55 (67.3%)	4-6 (66.7%)
Total attendance	317,707	134,178
Games – avg per game	5 – 63,541	4 – 33,544

=== Scores by quarter ===
	1	2	3	4	Total
Opponents	0	13	7	20	40
UCLA	91	82	62	132	367

=== Offense ===
==== Rushing ====
Name	GP-GS	Att	Gain	Loss	Net	Avg	TD	Long	Avg/G
Bruce Ballard	8-0	18	141	19	122	6.8	2		15.3
Doug Bradley	9-1	31	116	27	89	2.9	1		9.9
Sam Brown	8-2	23	165	30	135	5.9	5		16.9
Bob Davenport	9-9	105	505	26	479	4.6	11		53.2
Jim Decker	9-8	47	523	15	508	10.8	4		56.4
Johnny Hermann	9-1	23	171	16	155	6.7	2		17.2
Bob Heydenfeldt	9-3	1	0	8	-8	-8	2		-0.9
Rommie Loudd	9-6	3	7	3	4	1.3	5		0.4
Gerry McDougall	8-0	43	254	28	226	5.3	2		28.3
Clarence Norris	9-0	1	0	0	0	0	1		0
Doug Peters	9-0	42	193	12	181	4.3	2		20.1
Don Shinnick	9-0	28	210	0	210	7.5	1		23.3
Al Tanner	2-0	1	11	0	11	11	0		5.5
Primo Villanueva	8-6	87	544	58	486	5.6	4		60.8
*Bad Center Pass		1	0	20	-20	-20			
Total	115-36	454	2,860	262	2,578	5.7.6	42		22.4

==== Passing ====
Name	GP-GS	Effic	Att-Cmp-Int	Pct	Yds	TD	Lng	Avg/G
Doug Bradley	9-1		31-20-2	0.645	229	2		25.4
Sam Brown	8-2		12-3-1	0.25	54	1		6.8
Bob Davenport	9-9		1-0-0	0	0	0		0
Gerry McDougall	8-0		14-6-0	0.429	38	2		4.8
Primo Villanueva	9-6		49-23-7	0.469	400	5		44.4
Total	107-18		107-52-10	0.486	721	10		6.73

==== Receiving ====
Name	GP-GS	No.	Yds	Avg	TD	Long	Avg/G
Bob Ballard	8-0	2	36	18	1		4.5
Terry DeBay	9-8	1	12	12	1		1.3
Jim Decker	9-8	4	78	19.5	0		8.7
Russ Hampton	7-0	5	60	12	1		8.6
Johnny Hermann	9-1	5	73	14.6	2		8.1
Bob Heydenfeldt	9-3	6	110	18.3	1		12.2
Bob Long	9-9	11	157	14.3	0		17.4
Rommie Loudd	9-6	13	157	12.1	4		17.4
Clarence Norris	9-0	3	21	7	0		2.3
Gerry Okuneff	8-0	2	17	8.5	0		2.1
Total	86-35	52	721	13.9	10		8.4

=== Defense ===
Name	GP	Tackles				Sacks	Pass defense		Interceptions				Fumbles		Blkd kick
Name	GP	Solo	Ast	Total	TFL-yds	No-Yds	BrUp	QBH	No.-yds	Avg	TD	Long	Rcv-Yds	FF	Blkd kick
Bruce Ballard	8								4-60						
Warner Benjamin	9								1-9						
Bob Bergdahl	8								1-8						
Doug Bradley	9								2-31						
Richard Braunbeck	5								1-5						
Sam Brown	8								1-21						
Bob Davenport	9								1-64						
Terry DeBay	9								3-73						
Jim Decker	9								2-91						
Russ Hampton	7								1-0						
Johnny Hermann	9								2-44						
Bob Long	9								2-37						
Rommie Loudd	9								1-6						
Gerry Okuneff	8								2-5						
Steve Palmer	9								1-0						
Doug Peters	9								1-30						
Primo Villanueva	8								2-21						
Total	142								28-505						

=== Special teams ===
Name	Punting								Kickoffs					
Name	No.	Yds	Avg	Long	TB	FC	I20	Blkd	No.	Yds	Avg	TB	OB	
Doug Bradley	1	42	42											
Sam Brown	4	134	33.5											
Bob Heydenfeldt	26	1038	39.9											
Gerry McDougall	2	45	22.5											
Primo Villanueva	7	238	34											-
Total	40	1,497	37.4											

Name	Punt returns					Kick returns				
Name	No.	Yds	Avg	TD	Long	No.	Yds	Avg	TD	Long
Bob Ballard						1	17	17		
Doug Bradley	5	127	25.4			1	23	23		
Sam Brown	10	262	26.2			1	28	28		
Bob Davenport						4	74	18.5		
Jim Decker	1	18	18			2	29	14.5		
Jack Ellena	1	50	50							
Johnny Hermann	2	4	2							
Rommie Loudd						1	15	15		
Gerry McDougall						1	29	29		
Clarence Norris	1	21	21							
Doug Peters						1	18	18		
Primo Villanueva	12	106	8.8			4	80	20		
Total	32	588	18.3			9	313	34.7		

(Statistics compiled from individual NCAA game summaries)

== Awards and honors ==
All-American

- First Team All-American (Consensus)
  - Jack Ellena (AAB, AFCA, AP, INS, NEA, SN, UP)
- First Team All-American
  - Bob Davenport (AP-2, FWAA, INS-2, NEA-2, UP-3, CP-2)
  - Jim Salsbury (AFCA, AP-3, FWAA, INS-2, NEA-2, UP-2, CP-3)
- Second Team All-American
  - Primo Villaneva (AP-HR, UP-2, CP-HR, NEA-HR)
- Honorable Mention All-American
  - Sam Boghosian (UP-HR)
  - Hardiman Cureton (UP-HR, UP-HR)
  - Bob Heydenfeldt (UP-HR)
  - Bob Long (AP-HR)
  - Ronnie Loudd (UP-HR)
  - Terry Debay (UP-HR)
  - Jim Decker (UP-HR)
  - John Peterson (UP-HR, CP-HR)
  - Joe Ray (AP-HR, UP-HR)

Coaches' All-PCC

- All-PCC First Team
  - Bob Davenport
  - Jim Salsbury
  - Primo Villaneva
  - Jack Ellena
- All-PCC Second Team
  - Sam Boghosian
  - Herdiman Cureton
  - Bob Long
  - Jim Decker
  - Joe Ray
- Honorable Mention
  - John Hermann
  - Terry Debay
  - Gil Moreno
  - John Peterson

UP All-Coast Team

- All-Coast First Team
  - Bob Davenport
  - Jack Ellena
  - Jim Salsbury
  - Primo Villaneva
- All-Coast Second Team
  - Sam Boghosian
  - Herdiman Cureton
  - Bob Heydenfeldt

AP All-Pacific Coast Team

- All-Pacific First Team
  - Bob Davenport
  - Jack Ellena
  - Bob Long
  - Jim Salsbury
- All-Pacific Second Team
  - Sam Boghosian
  - Herdiman Cureton
  - Joe Ray
  - Primo Villaneva

== 1955 NFL draft ==
Rnd.	Pick	Team	Player	Pos.	College	Notes
2	18	Los Angeles Rams	Bob Long	B	UCLA	
2	24	Detroit Lions	Jim Salsbury	G	UCLA	
11	127	Los Angeles Rams	Joe Ray	T	UCLA	
