= Jack Ellena =

American football player (1931–2012)

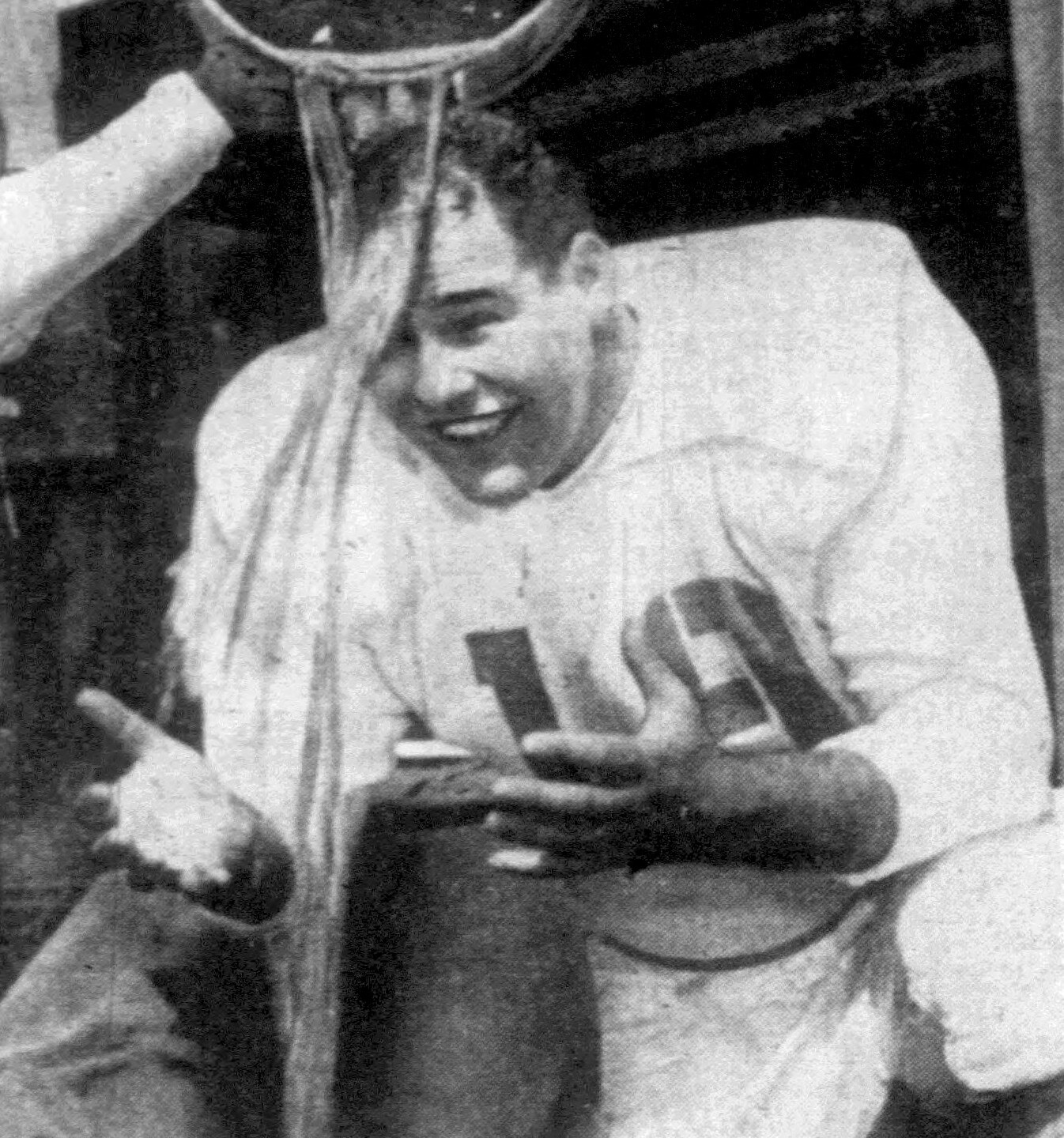
- Ellena in 1953

No. 60
- Positions: Guard, linebacker

Personal information
- Born: October 27, 1931; Susanville, California, U.S.
- Died: March 23, 2012 (aged 80); Palm Desert, California, U.S.
- Listed height: 6 ft 1 in (1.85 m)
- Listed weight: 225 lb (102 kg)

Career information
- College: UCLA
- NFL draft: 1953: 19th round, 229th overall pick

Career history
- Los Angeles Rams (1955–1956); Toronto Argonauts (1957)

Awards and highlights
- National champion (1954); Consensus All-American (1954); UPI Lineman of the Year (1954); 3× First-team All-PCC (1952, 1953, 1954); UCLA Athletics Hall of Fame

Career NFL statistics
- Games played: 21
- Games started: 4
- Fumble recoveries: 3
- Stats at Pro Football Reference

Jack Duane Ellena (October 27, 1931 – March 23, 2012) was an American professional football player.

Ellena played offensive tackle for coach Red Sanders at UCLA from 1952 to 1954. He was a member of the Bruins team that lost the 1954 Rose Bowl and was named that year's FWAA & UPI national champions. That same year, Ellena was named to the College Football All-America Team and won the UPI Lineman of the Year.

In addition to playing football for the Bruins, Ellena wrestled heavyweight at UCLA. He was a two-time Pacific Coast Intercollegiate heavyweight champ (1953, 1954), and placed fourth at the 1953 NCAA wrestling championships at Penn State, earning All-American honors.

Ellena was selected in the 19th round (228th overall) of the 1953 NFL draft by the Los Angeles Rams. He played guard and nose guard for the Rams from 1955 to 1956. He was cut by the Rams in 1957 and was unable sign with any teams in the National Football League or Canadian Football League.

After his football career, Ellena ran Mountain Meadow Ranch, a summer camp located near his home town of Susanville, California. In 1987, he was inducted into the UCLA Athletics Hall of Fame.
