= 1954 California Golden Bears football team =

American college football season

1954 California Golden Bears football
- Conference: Pacific Coast Conference
- Record: 5–5 (4–3 PCC)
- Head coach: Pappy Waldorf (8th season)
- Home stadium: California Memorial Stadium

1954 Pacific Coast Conference football standings
	Conf.					Overall
Team	W		L		T	W		L		T
No. 2 UCLA $	6	–	0	–	0	9	–	0	–	0
No. 17 USC ^	6	–	1	–	0	8	–	4	–	0
Oregon	5	–	3	–	0	6	–	4	–	0
California	4	–	3	–	0	5	–	5	–	0
Washington State	3	–	4	–	0	4	–	6	–	0
Stanford	2	–	4	–	0	4	–	6	–	0
Idaho	1	–	2	–	0	4	–	5	–	0
Washington	1	–	6	–	0	2	–	8	–	0
Oregon State	1	–	6	–	0	1	–	8	–	0
$ – Conference champion; ^ – Selected as Rose Bowl representative UCLA won rivalry game over USC, but no-repeat rule was in effect; Rankings from AP Poll

The 1954 California Golden Bears football team was an American football team that represented the University of California, Berkeley in the Pacific Coast Conference (PCC) during the 1954 college football season. Under eighth-year head coach Pappy Waldorf, the Golden Bears compiled an overall record of 5–5 (4–3 in PCC, fourth). Home games were played on campus at California Memorial Stadium in Berkeley, California.

== Schedule ==
Date	Opponent	Rank	Site	Result	Attendance	Source
September 18	No. 2 Oklahoma*	No. 12	California Memorial Stadium; Berkeley, CA	L 13–27	58,000	
September 25	San Jose State*	No. 17	California Memorial Stadium; Berkeley, CA	W 45–0	32,000	
October 2	at No. 14 Ohio State*	No. 18	Ohio Stadium; Columbus, OH	L 13–21	79,524	
October 9	Oregon		California Memorial Stadium; Berkeley, CA	L 27–33	31,000	
October 16	Washington State		California Memorial Stadium; Berkeley, CA	W 17–7	27,000	
October 23	at No. 17 USC		Los Angeles Memorial Coliseum; Los Angeles, CA	L 27–29	66,342	
October 30	No. 3 UCLA		California Memorial Stadium; Berkeley, CA (rivalry)	L 6–27	64,000	
November 6	at Washington		Husky Stadium; Seattle, WA	W 27–6	36,500	
November 13	Oregon State		California Memorial Stadium; Berkeley, CA	W 46–7	22,000	
November 20	Stanford		California Memorial Stadium; Berkeley, CA (Big Game)	W 28–20	81,490	
*Non-conference game; Rankings from AP Poll released prior to the game; Source:
