= Jack Patera =

American football player and coach (1933–2018)

No. 61, 56
- Positions: Guard; Linebacker

Personal information
- Born: August 1, 1933; Bismarck, North Dakota, U.S.
- Died: October 31, 2018 (aged 85); Cle Elum, Washington, U.S.
- Listed height: 6 ft 1 in (1.85 m)
- Listed weight: 234 lb (106 kg)

Career information
- High school: Portland (OR) Washington
- College: Oregon
- NFL draft: 1955: 4th round, 44th overall pick

Career history

Playing
- Baltimore Colts (1955–1957); Chicago Cardinals (1958–1959); Dallas Cowboys (1960–1961)

Coaching
- Los Angeles Rams (1963–1967) Defensive line; New York Giants (1967-1968) Assistant; Minnesota Vikings (1969–1975) Defensive line; Seattle Seahawks (1976–1982) Head coach

Awards and highlights
- AP NFL Coach of the Year (1978); First-team All-PCC (1954); Second-team All-PCC (1953)

Career NFL statistics
- Games played: 61
- Games started: 33
- Fumble recoveries: 4
- Stats at Pro Football Reference

Head coaching record
- Regular season: 35–59–0 (.372)
- Coaching profile at Pro Football Reference

John Arlen Patera (August 1, 1933 – October 31, 2018) was an American professional football player and coach in the National Football League (NFL). He played for the Baltimore Colts, Chicago Cardinals, and Dallas Cowboys, and was an assistant coach for the Los Angeles Rams, New York Giants, and Minnesota Vikings. Patera was the first head coach of the Seattle Seahawks, with a career head coaching record of 35–59 (.372), all with the Seahawks.

== Early life ==
Born in Bismarck, North Dakota, Patera attended Washington High School in Portland, Oregon. Upon graduation in 1951, he enrolled at the University of Oregon in Eugene, where he played college football for the Ducks from 1951 through 1954, earning All-Pacific Coast Conference honors as a guard in his senior year. He was selected to play in the East–West Shrine Game, the Hula Bowl, and the College All-Star Game (in August 1955).

On a morning deer hunt east of Eugene in 1954, 21-year-old Patera accidentally shot and killed former Oregon teammate Ken Sweitzer, a graduate assistant with the team. It was ruled accidental and he was cleared of negligence.

== Professional career ==
=== Baltimore Colts ===
Patera was selected by the Baltimore Colts in the fourth round (44th overall) of the 1955 NFL draft. Although he was the left guard as a rookie, because of an injury to the starting middle linebacker, he was forced to play both offense and defense for three weeks, before concentrating fully on being the team's middle linebacker.

Patera played linebacker for three seasons under head coach Weeb Ewbank. After choosing not to switch back to offense, he was released on September 15, 1958.

=== Chicago Cardinals ===
On September 17, 1958, Patera was signed by the Chicago Cardinals and played for two seasons under head coach Frank Ivy.

=== Dallas Cowboys ===
In 1960, Patera was selected by the Dallas Cowboys in the expansion draft. Under head coach Tom Landry, he was designated as the first starting middle linebacker in franchise history. His playing career ended early when he re-injured his knee in the fourth game of the season against the Cleveland Browns. He was replaced with Jerry Tubbs.

Patera returned in 1961, but played in only two games and retired at the end of the season after not being fully recovered from his previous injury.

== Coaching career ==
=== Assistant coach ===
His playing days over, Patera turned his attention to coaching and joined the Los Angeles Rams in 1963 as a defensive line coach. During his tenure with the Rams from 1963 to 1967, he was responsible for directing the Fearsome Foursome, one of the most dominating defensive lines in the NFL during the sixties.

In 1968, Patera became an assistant coach for the New York Giants, but left after one year to take an assistant coaching position with the Minnesota Vikings under head coach Bud Grant. As defensive line coach with the Vikings from 1969 through 1975, Patera worked with another very talented and dominant defensive line, nicknamed the Purple People Eaters. During this period, the Vikings went to three Super Bowls (IV, VIII, IX).

=== Head coach ===
In January 1976, Patera was hired as the head coach for the expansion Seattle Seahawks. Shortly after arriving, he began the difficult task of building a competitive team from the ground up. Along with the Tampa Bay Buccaneers, the Seahawks selected 39 players through the expansion draft on March 30–31. The other 26 teams each protected 29 players on their rosters; Seattle and Tampa Bay alternated selections from the remaining pool of unprotected players. Acquiring quality veteran players via free agency was not an aspect of the league at that time. However, the Seahawks were awarded the second overall pick in the 1976 NFL draft, a pick they used on defensive tackle Steve Niehaus, an All-America defensive tackle at Notre Dame, who went on to be a bust in the NFL, unlike fellow Fighting Irish defensive linemen Ross Browner and Mike Fanning, each of whom went on to start in a Super Bowl and enjoyed lengthy professional careers.

Since he would not have the player talent to compete with other NFL teams possessing superior power, speed and finesse, Patera resorted to a wide-open gambling style offense that was centered around a passing game using many creative gadget plays. "I had a team that could move the ball like hell, but couldn't stop anybody." Patera said, "So I figured that to win more ballgames we'd simply have to gamble more often. I would much rather have beaten teams on muscle and execution, but we just didn't have the talent."

Even with the lack of talent, Patera still found a way to win games, but in 1976, the Seahawks had a 2–12 record, typical for a first year expansion team. The season showed promise for the future with quarterback Jim Zorn and wide receiver Steve Largent beginning to develop into a potent offensive combination and behind them, Seattle posted a 5–9 record in 1977. When the Seahawks improved to 9–7 in their third season, Patera was voted the NFL Coach of the Year in 1978 by the Associated Press and The Sporting News. The Seahawks were 9–7 again in 1979, but had disappointing losing seasons in 1980 (4–12) and 1981 (6–10).

As a head coach, Patera was considered to be a stern disciplinarian with strict rules of conduct. For example, he required players to hold their helmets a certain way on the sidelines during the playing of the national anthem. His players were required to wear coats and ties when traveling on the road. One of his most controversial rules was that he wouldn't allow players to have water breaks during practices at training camp in Cheney in eastern Washington, where temperatures frequently reached above 90 °F (32 °C) in July and August, a common practice by many teams back then.

Patera's relationship with the local press in Seattle was stormy at times. He did not enjoy the constant questions about his coaching decisions and the dissection of his team's performance by the sports reporters. He once held a seven-second press conference after a particularly difficult loss in Seattle. After asking, "Any questions?", he left the room when reporters started giggling when none of them spoke up.

In 1982, the players' association (NFLPA) was threatening to strike over deadlocked negotiations with NFL team owners to give a percentage of the gross revenues for player salaries. Patera's relationship with his players rapidly deteriorated when he first threatened and then fined players for participating in a union solidarity handshake with the opposing team at midfield during pre-season games (actually it was team management that made the decision; GM John Thompson was a former head of the NFL bargaining committee). When Sam McCullum, a popular player and union representative, was cut by Patera one week before the season started, it was speculated the release was done as retaliation for McCullum's union activities. The release was eventually ruled an illegal termination in an "Unfair Labor Practice" lawsuit brought against the team by the NFLPA and McCullum.

After losing the first two games of the 1982 season, Patera was fired by the Seahawks on October 13, along with general manager Thompson. The announcement was made by John Nordstrom, representing the Nordstrom family as majority owners. The firing occurred during the 57-day NFL players strike which had started on September 21. He was replaced by Mike McCormack, the Seahawks director of football operations, as the interim head coach for the remainder of the 1982 season.

==== Head coaching record ====
Team	Year	Regular season					Postseason			
Team	Year	Won	Lost	Ties	Win %	Finish	Won	Lost	Win %	Result
SEA	1976	2	12	0	.143	5th in NFC West	–	–	–	–
SEA	1977	5	9	0	.357	5th in AFC West	–	–	–	–
SEA	1978	9	7	0	.563	T-2nd in AFC West	–	–	–	–
SEA	1979	9	7	0	.563	T-3rd in AFC West	–	–	–	–
SEA	1980	4	12	0	.250	5th in AFC West	–	–	–	–
SEA	1981	6	10	0	.375	5th in AFC West	–	–	–	–
SEA	1982	0	2	0	.000		–	–	–	–
SEA total		35	59	0	.372		–	–	–	
Total		35	59	0	.372		–	–	–	

== Personal life ==
After leaving the Seahawks, Patera never took another coaching position and completely retired from football. He resided east of Seattle in Cle Elum with his three dogs. He and his wife, Susan, were divorced after 44 years of marriage. They had four children, 9 grandchildren, and 11 great-grandchildren.

Patera was the older brother of Olympic weightlifter and professional wrestler Ken Patera and San Francisco 49ers kicker Dennis Patera.

In 1982, Patera was inducted into the Oregon Sports Hall of Fame. In 2000, he was inducted into the University of Oregon Athletics Hall of Fame.

Patera died at the age of 85 from pancreatic cancer on October 31, 2018.
