= Yates, Missouri =

Unincorporated community in Missouri, US

Coordinates: 39°18′37″N 92°35′58″W

Yates is an unincorporated community in Randolph County, in the U.S. state of Missouri.

== History ==
A variant name was "Yatesville". A post office called Yatesville was established in 1879, the name was changed to Yates in 1882, and the post office closed in 1954. The community has the name of George Yates, the original owner of the town site. The Battle of Roan's Tan Yard occurred near the site of Yates.Weeks, Michael (2009). The Complete Civil War Road Trip Guide. Woodstock, Vermont: The Countryman Press. ISBN 978-0-88150-860-4.

== Notable people ==
- Jess Hill (1907–1993), baseball player
