= 1954 Oregon Ducks football team =

American college football season

1954 Oregon Ducks football
- Conference: Pacific Coast Conference
- Record: 6–4 (5–3 PCC)
- Head coach: Len Casanova (4th season)
- Captain: Ron Pheister
- Home stadium: Hayward Field, Multnomah Stadium

1954 Pacific Coast Conference football standings
	Conf.					Overall
Team	W		L		T	W		L		T
No. 2 UCLA $	6	–	0	–	0	9	–	0	–	0
No. 17 USC ^	6	–	1	–	0	8	–	4	–	0
Oregon	5	–	3	–	0	6	–	4	–	0
California	4	–	3	–	0	5	–	5	–	0
Washington State	3	–	4	–	0	4	–	6	–	0
Stanford	2	–	4	–	0	4	–	6	–	0
Idaho	1	–	2	–	0	4	–	5	–	0
Washington	1	–	6	–	0	2	–	8	–	0
Oregon State	1	–	6	–	0	1	–	8	–	0
$ – Conference champion; ^ – Selected as Rose Bowl representative UCLA won rivalry game over USC, but no-repeat rule was in effect; Rankings from AP Poll

The 1954 Oregon Ducks football team represented the University of Oregon as a member of the Pacific Coast Conference (PCC) during the 1954 college football season. In their fourth season under head coach Len Casanova, the Ducks compiled a 6–4 record (5–3 in PCC, third), and outscored their opponents 218 to 159. The team played its home games on campus in Eugene at Hayward Field, and at Multnomah Stadium in Portland.

On a morning deer hunt east of Eugene in mid-October, senior guard Jack Patera of Portland mistakenly shot and killed former Oregon teammate Ken Sweitzer, a graduate assistant. It was ruled accidental and he was cleared of negligence. This was the second death for the team in two months; in mid-August, junior guard Doyle Higdon of Cottage Grove was killed in a logging explosion while removing stumps.

Oregon won all four games against northwest PCC opponents; their next sweep came 26 years later.

== Schedule ==
Date	Opponent	Rank	Site	Result	Attendance	Source
September 18	at Idaho	No. 18	Neale Stadium; Moscow, ID	W 41–0	7,000	
September 25	Stanford	No. 16	Multnomah Stadium; Portland, OR	L 13–18	30,214	
October 2	Utah*		Hayward Field; Eugene, OR	L 6–7	11,000	
October 9	at California		California Memorial Stadium; Berkeley, CA	W 33–27	31,000	
October 16	USC		Multnomah Stadium; Portland, OR	L 14–24	22,766	
October 23	San Jose State*		Hayward Field; Eugene, OR	W 26–7	10,000	
October 30	at Washington		Husky Stadium; Seattle, WA (rivalry)	W 26–7	38,300	
November 6	at No. 1 UCLA		Los Angeles Memorial Coliseum; Los Angeles, CA	L 0–41	46,435	
November 13	Washington State		Hayward Field; Eugene, OR	W 26–14	16,500	
November 20	at Oregon State		Parker Stadium; Corvallis, OR (Civil War)	W 33–14	21,200	
*Non-conference game; Rankings from AP Poll released prior to the game; Source:
