= Duke Washington =

American football player (1933–2017)

No. 22
- Position: Running back

Personal information
- Born: October 11, 1933; Forest, Mississippi, U.S.
- Died: February 16, 2017 (aged 83)
- Listed height: 5 ft 11 in (1.80 m)
- Listed weight: 190 lb (86 kg)

Career information
- High school: Pasco (WA)
- College: Washington State
- NFL draft: 1955: 10th round, 118th overall pick

Career history
- Philadelphia Eagles (1955)

Awards and highlights
- Second-team All-PCC (1954)

Carl Talmage "Duke" Washington (October 3, 1933 – February 16, 2017) was an American former football running back from Pasco, Washington, famous for his play for Washington State University.

== Football career ==
He is thought of by many as the greatest running back in Pasco High School history. His accomplishments at PHS, and later with the Washington State Cougars in the early to mid 1950s, compare to other great backs of his day. Duke Washington is best known as the first black man to play in the University of Texas’ Memorial Stadium.

Washington, a captain on the 1954 WSU squad, was given the option to not play against the Longhorns in their home stadium, which had an “unofficial” rule that forbid blacks from playing either for or against Texas. The WSU Cougar administration said “no Washington, no game” and, despite having to stay at a private home instead of with the team in the hotel the night before, played well in the Cougar loss. In addition to becoming the first black athlete to play football in Memorial Stadium, Washington also became the first black athlete to score a touchdown in Memorial Stadium, torching the Longhorn defense in a 40-14 losing effort.

Duke Washington played in a game and recorded a touchdown run. He played in the 1954 East West Shrine Game and was part of the Washington State team that defeated the University of Washington three times. He ran for 115 yards in a game at Oregon State University while playing as a fullback. Washington was drafted by the Philadelphia Eagles in 1955. After one year, he was released and worked as a Seattle-area art teacher, a Vice Principal at Seattle's Franklin High School, and Assistant Dean of Students at the University of Washington, as well as an artist and art collector.

In the fall of 2009, Duke Washington was inducted into the Washington State University Athletic Hall of Fame.

Washington died on February 16, 2017, at the age of 83 from complications with pneumonia.
