= Leon Clarke (American football) =

American football player (1933–2009)

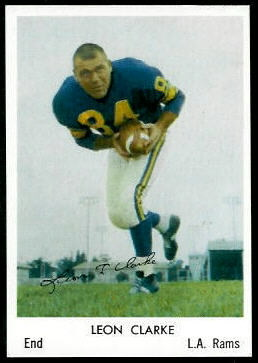
- Clarke in 1959

No. 84, 81
- Position: Tight end

Personal information
- Born: January 10, 1933; Venice, California, U.S.
- Died: October 5, 2009 (aged 76); Los Alamitos, California, U.S.
- Listed height: 6 ft 4 in (1.93 m)
- Listed weight: 232 lb (105 kg)

Career information
- High school: Venice (Los Angeles, California)
- College: USC
- NFL draft: 1956: 2nd round, 14th overall pick

Career history
- Los Angeles Rams (1956–1959); Cleveland Browns (1960–1962); Minnesota Vikings (1963)

Awards and highlights
- Pro Bowl (1956); Second-team All-PCC (1954)

Career NFL statistics
- Receptions: 141
- Receiving yards: 2,215
- Receiving touchdowns: 18
- Stats at Pro Football Reference

Leon Clarke (January 10, 1933 – October 5, 2009) was an American professional football player who was a tight end in the National Football League (NFL) from 1956 to 1963.

Clarke prepped at Venice High School. He played college football for the USC Trojans and played in the Pro Bowl in 1956.

Clarke was also an All-American hurdler for the USC Trojans track and field team, finishing 3rd in the 220 yards hurdles at the 1955 NCAA track and field championships.

Clarke died of pancreatitis in Los Alamitos, California, on October 5, 2009. He was 76 years old.

== NFL career statistics ==
Legend
**Bold**	Career high

Year	Team	Games		Receiving				
Year	Team	GP	GS	Rec	Yds	Avg	Lng	TD
1956	RAM	12	11	**36**	**650**	18.1	60	**4**
1957	RAM	9	7	23	442	**19.2**	70	**4**
1958	RAM	11	5	18	135	7.5	17	**4**
1959	RAM	11	10	29	453	15.6	60	0
1960	CLE	9	4	11	184	16.7	**86**	**4**
1961	CLE	13	1	11	211	**19.2**	41	2
1962	CLE	11	0	10	106	10.6	22	0
1963	MIN	3	0	3	34	11.3	14	0
		79	38	141	2,215	15.7	86	18
