= Jon Arnett =

American football player (1935–2021)

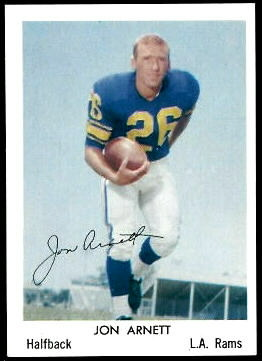

No. 26, 21
- Positions: Halfback, return specialist

Personal information
- Born: April 20, 1935; Los Angeles, California, U.S.
- Died: January 16, 2021 (aged 85); Lake Oswego, Oregon, U.S.
- Listed height: 5 ft 11 in (1.80 m)
- Listed weight: 197 lb (89 kg)

Career information
- High school: Manual Arts (CA)
- College: USC (1953–1956)
- NFL draft: 1957: 1st round, 2nd overall pick

Career history
- Los Angeles Rams (1957–1963); Chicago Bears (1964–1966)

Awards and highlights
- First-team All-Pro (1958); Second-team All-Pro (1961); 5× Pro Bowl (1957–1961); First-team All-American (1955); Second-team All-American (1956); 2× Voit Trophy (1955, 1956); Pop Warner Trophy (1956); 2× First-team All-PCC (1955, 1956); Second-team All-PCC (1954); Helms Athletic Foundation Hall of Fame

Career NFL statistics
- Games played: 123
- Starts: 85
- Rushing yards: 3,833 (4.0 average)
- Receiving yards: 2,290 (10.3 average)
- Kick return yards: 3,110 (24.7 average)
- Punt return yards: 981 (8.2 average)
- Touchdowns: 39
- Stats at Pro Football Reference
- College Football Hall of Fame

Jon Dwane "Jaguar Jon" Arnett (April 20, 1935 – January 16, 2021) was an American professional football player. He was a first-team All-American out of USC and was chosen in the first round, second pick overall, of the 1957 NFL draft by the Los Angeles Rams.

Arnett was a prototype of the modern National Football League all-purpose back, a game-breaker who excelled on runs from scrimmage, pass receptions and kick returns. In 10 seasons, he was selected five consecutive times to the Pro Bowl (1957–1961) before chronic knee pain reduced his effectiveness. He was elected to the College Football Hall of Fame in 2001.

Arnett was known to teammates as "The Cat" and by the more common nickname of "Jaguar Jon" to fans and media alike. The nicknames were attributed to an "unusual sense of balance and body coordination which enables him to dodge, cut, and slip from tacklers."

== Biography ==
=== Early life ===
Arnett was born on April 20, 1935, and attended Manual Arts High School in Los Angeles, where he competed on the school gymnastics team. He later attributed much of his success on the gridiron to his gymnastics background. Arnett also participated in track and field in high school and later in college, specializing in the long jump. In 1954, he threatened the record of 24'8.75" in an NCAA meet.

In 1952, Arnett scored 112 points as a senior, eclipsing the single-season high school record of 110 while leading the Manual Arts Toilers to the Los Angeles city championship. The All-Southern California Board of Football, working through the Helms Athletic Association, named Arnett to the first team of the Los Angeles All-City prep football team as well as Player of the Year.

=== College career ===
Arnett attended the University of Southern California, where he was a member of the football and track teams. It was on the gridiron where he made his name. Arnett was the multiple recipient of the W. J. Voit Memorial Trophy as the outstanding football player on the Pacific Coast. He was awarded the Voit Trophy in 1955 and 1956.

- 1954: 96 carries for 601 yards and 7 TD. 3 catches for 104 yards and 2 TD.
- 1955: 141 carries for 672 yards and 11 TD. 6 catches for 154 yards and 3 TD.
- 1956: 99 carries for 625 yards and 6 TD. 2 catches for 38 yards.

During his sophomore season, USC was granted a bid to the 1955 Rose Bowl despite a second-place finish in the Pacific Coast Conference, owing to UCLA being ruled ineligible. Arnett acquitted himself well, finishing with 123 yards gained on just nine carries, including a 70-yard scamper in the fourth quarter. The Trojans fell by a 20–7 score nonetheless.

Arnett was a first team All-American during his 1955 junior year at USC but was limited to only half a season of eligibility in 1956 due to NCAA penalties against the Pacific Coast Conference for recruiting violations.

Arnett was also an All-American long jumper for the USC Trojans track and field team, finishing runner-up in the long jump at the 1954 NCAA track and field championships.

=== Professional career ===
Arnett was selected by the Los Angeles Rams in the first round of the 1957 NFL draft (No. 2 overall), one of two backs picked ahead of the legendary Syracuse Jim Brown in the order. His initial contract signed with the Rams was a one-year deal for $15,000. The most he ever made in a single season during his ten-year career was $37,000.

In addition to averaging 4.6 yards per carry during his first four seasons, Arnett also served as a punt return and kickoff return specialist. He also was among the team's top pass receivers and lined up at split end on occasion.

In 1958, Arnett had the best season of his career. He amassed 1,177 yards from scrimmage, fourth most in the league. The highlight came in Week 6, when he ran wild in a 42–28 victory over the Chicago Bears in Los Angeles. Overall, Arnett accounted for 295 yards—90 on the ground in 10 carries, 71 on three pass receptions and 134 more on four kick returns. The memorable performance was not lost on head coach George Halas and the Bears, who would acquire him in a trade six years later.

Arnett's production tailed off after the 1961 season, the last of his five consecutive trips to the Pro Bowl, when a chronic knee sprain began to exact its toll. Largely robbed of the fluidity which made his open-field running a constant big play threat for the Rams, the veteran came to be viewed as expendable by the team in the run-up to the 1964 season. Arnett acknowledged his status, declaring "The hardest thing with any athlete is to be injured. The relationship with players and coaches becomes different."

With predictions of the forthcoming move rife, Arnett was traded to the Chicago Bears in August, 1964. In the 3-for-1 trade the Rams received four-year starting guard Roger Davis, center Joe Wendryhoski, a veteran of the Canadian Football League, and rookie defensive back Frank Budka.

Halas declared that the addition of Arnett would help fill a "gaping hole" for his club in wake of the untimely death of halfback Willie Galimore prior to the season. "Ron Bull has been filling in adequately," Halas said, "but we needed another man at the position." Arnett never regained his former status, however, and he spent three uneventful seasons with the Bears before he opted for retirement after the 1966 campaign.

=== NFL career statistics ===
| Year | Team | Games | | Rushing | | | | | Receiving | | | | |
| Year | Team | GP | GS | Att | Yds | Avg | Lng | TD | Rec | Yds | Avg | Lng | TD |
|---|---|---|---|---|---|---|---|---|---|---|---|---|---|
| 1957 | LAR | 12 | 9 | 86 | 347 | 4.0 | 68 | 2 | 18 | 322 | 17.9 | 66 | 3 |
| 1958 | LAR | 12 | 12 | 133 | 683 | 5.1 | 57 | 6 | 35 | 494 | 14.1 | 75 | 1 |
| 1959 | LAR | 12 | 11 | 73 | 371 | 5.1 | 80 | 2 | 38 | 419 | 11.0 | 38 | 1 |
| 1960 | LAR | 12 | 12 | 104 | 436 | 4.2 | 31 | 2 | 29 | 226 | 7.8 | 24 | 2 |
| 1961 | LAR | 14 | 14 | 158 | 609 | 3.9 | 26 | 4 | 28 | 194 | 6.9 | 29 | 0 |
| 1962 | LAR | 10 | 7 | 76 | 238 | 3.1 | 40 | 2 | 12 | 137 | 11.4 | 40 | 0 |
| 1963 | LAR | 9 | 8 | 58 | 208 | 3.6 | 20 | 1 | 15 | 119 | 7.9 | 41 | 1 |
| 1964 | CHI | 14 | 8 | 119 | 400 | 3.1 | 21 | 1 | 25 | 223 | 8.9 | 27 | 2 |
| 1965 | CHI | 14 | 3 | 102 | 363 | 3.6 | 24 | 5 | 12 | 114 | 9.5 | 30 | 0 |
| 1966 | CHI | 14 | 1 | 55 | 178 | 3.2 | 21 | 1 | 10 | 42 | 4.2 | 11 | 0 |
| Career | | 123 | 85 | 964 | 3,833 | 4.0 | 80 | 26 | 222 | 2,290 | 10.3 | 75 | 10 |

=== Life after football ===
Arnett was married in June 1959 to a former USC classmate and Rose Parade princess, Yvonne Flint of Pasadena.

During his NFL years Arnett worked in the off-season as a stock and bond broker for the firm of Hayden, Stone & Co. of Beverly Hills.

Arnett ran a distribution service and supplied frozen foods to Costco, Sam's Club, and Wal-Mart. After living for many years in the Los Angeles County coastal town of Rancho Palos Verdes, Arnett and his family moved to Lake Oswego, Oregon.

"I went to grammar school, junior high school, high school, USC, and the Rams, all within a 5 mile radius," Arnett told an Oregon journalist in 2008. "I was really a Southern California person. Now you couldn’t get me to go back there."

=== Death and legacy ===
Arnett died on January 16, 2021, from heart failure in Lake Oswego, Oregon.

Arnett was inducted into the USC Athletic Hall of Fame in 1994 and the College Football Hall of Fame in 2001 as a member of the USC Trojans.
