= Burdette Hess =

American-born Canadian gridiron football player (1933-2012)

Profile
- Positions: Guard, Tackle

Personal information
- Born: February 18, 1933; Caldwell, Idaho, U.S.
- Died: October 24, 2012 (aged 79); Calgary, Alberta, Canada
- Listed height: 6 ft 1 in (1.85 m)
- Listed weight: 235 lb (107 kg)

Career history
- 1955–1957: Calgary Stampeders

Burdette "Archie" Hess (February 18, 1933 – October 24, 2012) was an American professional football player who played for the Calgary Stampeders. He played college football at the University of Idaho. After retirement he embarked on a career as a geologist at Pacific Petroleums. eventually rose to become General Manager of Western Canada Exploration at Petro-Canada in Calgary, Alberta.
