= Bob Heydenfeldt =

American gridiron football player (born 1933)

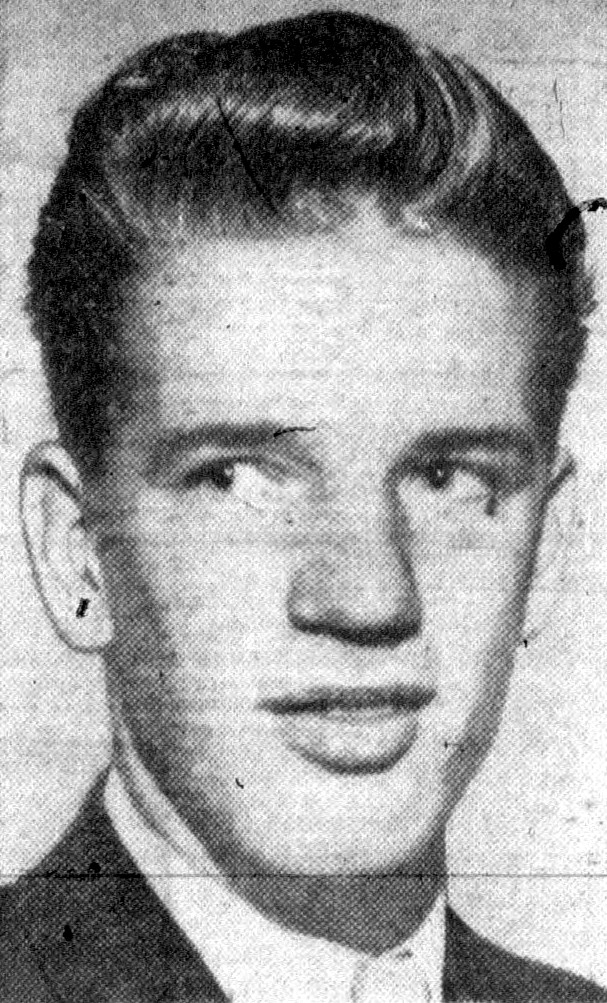
- Heydenfeldt, circa 1950

Profile
- Positions: Halfback, Punter

Personal information
- Born: September 17, 1933 (age 93); Canoga Park, California, U.S.
- Listed height: 6 ft 2 in (1.88 m)
- Listed weight: 190 lb (86 kg)

Career information
- College: University of California, Los Angeles

Career history
- 1955: Edmonton Eskimos

Awards and highlights
- 1955 Grey Cup champion; National champion (1954); Second-team All-PCC (1954)

Robert Marshall Heydenfeldt (born September 17, 1933) is a former American and Canadian football player.

Heydenfeldt played tight end and punter for coach Red Sanders at University of California, Los Angeles (UCLA) from 1952-1954. He was a member of the Bruins team that in 1954 was named the FWAA & UPI National Champions. He was commissioned a 2nd lieutenant in the United States Air Force Reserves upon graduation from UCLA. He played professionally for the Edmonton Eskimos of the Western Interprovincial Football Union and won the 1955 Grey Cup. Heydenfeldt returned to the U.S. after one season in Canada and joined the Air Force. He was stationed at Hamilton Air Force Base in Novato, California and played End for the base football team. He later opened a sporting goods store with former UCLA teammate Don Long.
