= Jim Salsbury =

American football player (1932–2002)

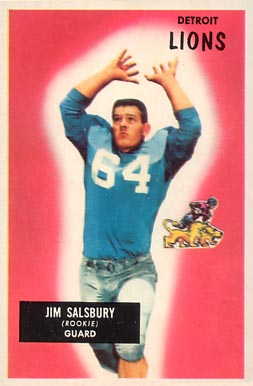
- Salsbury on a 1955 Bowman football card

No. 60, 67
- Positions: Guard, tackle

Personal information
- Born: August 8, 1932; Los Angeles, California, U.S.
- Died: March 29, 2002 (aged 69); Paradise Valley, Arizona, U.S.
- Listed height: 6 ft 1 in (1.85 m)
- Listed weight: 233 lb (106 kg)

Career information
- High school: Alexander Hamilton (Los Angeles)
- College: UCLA
- NFL draft: 1955: 2nd round, 24th overall pick

Career history
- Detroit Lions (1955–1956); Green Bay Packers (1957–1958)

Awards and highlights
- First-team All-American (1954); 2× First-team All-PCC (1952, 1954)

Career NFL statistics
- Games played: 47
- Games started: 41
- Fumble recoveries: 2
- Stats at Pro Football Reference

Jim Salsbury (August 8, 1932 – March 29, 2002) was an American professional football player who was a guard in the National Football League (NFL). He played college football for the UCLA Bruins. Salsbury was selected by the Detroit Lions in the second round of the 1955 NFL draft and played two seasons with the team. Later he played two seasons with the Green Bay Packers.
