= 1955 Rose Bowl =

American college football game

- 41st Rose Bowl Game
USC Trojans	Ohio State Buckeyes
(8–3)	(9–0)
PCC	Big Ten
7	20
Head coach: Jess Hill	Head coach: Woody Hayes
AP / Coaches; 17 / 11	AP / Coaches; 1 / 2
	1	2	3	4	Total
USC	0	7	0	0	7
Ohio State	0	14	0	6	20
- Date: January 1, 1955
- Season: 1954
- Stadium: Rose Bowl
- Location: Pasadena, California
- MVP: Dave Leggett (Ohio State QB)
- Favorite: Ohio State by 14 points
- Referee: Edward Wagner (AAWU; split crew: AAWU, Big Ten)
- Halftime show: K. Massey & Archie Whatley
- Attendance: 89,191

United States TV coverage
- Network: NBC
- Announcers: Mel Allen

The 1955 Rose Bowl was the 41st edition of the college football bowl game, played at the Rose Bowl in Pasadena, California, on Saturday, January 1. The top-ranked Ohio State Buckeyes of the Big Ten Conference defeated the USC Trojans of the Pacific Coast Conference, 20–7.

Ohio State head coach Woody Hayes came into his first Rose Bowl tied for the national championship with PCC champion UCLA. However, #2 UCLA was locked out of the game because of the PCC's "no-repeat" rule, enacted after California's third consecutive appearance in January 1951.

== Teams ==
=== Ohio State ===
Ohio State quarterback Dave Leggett threw eleven passes, completing six, one a touchdown pass to Robert Archbald Watkins Jr. Halfback Hopalong Cassady ran for 92 yards and led the Buckeyes to 304 yards on the ground and an overall advantage of 360-206 yards in total offense.

=== USC ===
The only touchdown by USC was an 86-yard punt return by Aramis Dandoy.

== Game summary ==
The teams played in the first rainstorm to hit Pasadena during a Rose Bowl in more than 50 years. The fans were under umbrellas, and it rained during the entire game, turning the field to mud.

=== Scoring ===
==== First quarter ====
No scoring

==== Second quarter ====
- OSU – Dave Leggett 3-yard run (Tad Weed kick)
- OSU – Bob Watkins 21-yard pass from Leggett (Watkins kick)
- USC – Aramis Dandoy 86-yard punt return (Sam Tsagalakis kick)

==== Third quarter ====
No scoring

==== Fourth quarter ====
- OSU – Dick Harkrader 9-yard run (Weed kick blocked)

== Aftermath ==
- Ohio State shared the national championship with UCLA for the 1954 season. It was the first "split" championship in college football, when the writers selected the Buckeyes and the coaches chose the Bruins.
- This was the first time a West Coast team had been affected by the "no-repeat" rule, which was not in place when California appeared in three straight (1949, 1950, 1951). It happened once more, when Oregon State had to stay home three years later. When the PCC disbanded in 1959, the "no-repeat" rule was dropped by the new AAWU and Washington won the next two Rose Bowls in 1960 and 1961. The Big Ten kept the rule in place from the late 1940s into the early 1970s, although Minnesota made consecutive appearances, the 1961 game was as an "at-large" selection. After the rule was dropped, the first to return in successive years was Ohio State in 1974, the sole win for the Big Ten in that decade.

== Game notes ==
- The game was played in the rain; Coach Hayes was not happy that the bands performed the halftime show on the already muddy field
