= 1955 NFL draft =

National Football League draft

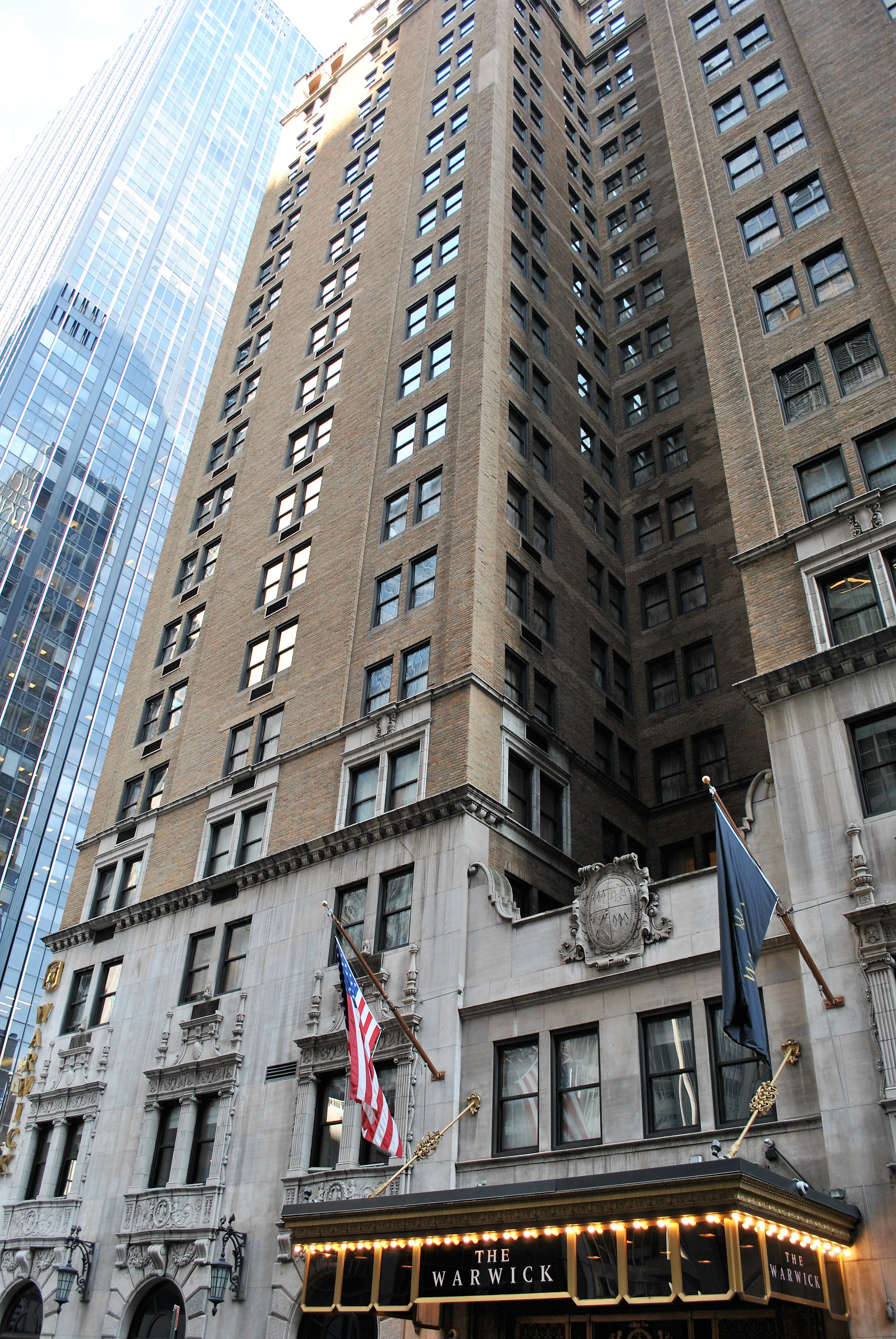
- Warwick Hotel (location of the draft), photographed in 2016

General information
- Date: January 27–28, 1955
- Location: Warwick Hotel in New York City

Overview
- 360 total selections in 30 rounds
- League: NFL
- First selection: George Shaw, QB; Baltimore Colts
- Mr. Irrelevant: Lamar Leachman, C Cleveland Browns
- Most selections (34): Los Angeles Rams
- Fewest selections (25): New York Giants
- Hall of Famers: 1: QB Johnny Unitas

The 1955 NFL draft was held January 27–28, 1955 at the Warwick Hotel in New York City.

This was the ninth year that the first overall pick was a bonus pick determined by lottery. With the previous eight winners ineligible from the draw, only the Baltimore Colts, Chicago Cardinals, Green Bay Packers, and Pittsburgh Steelers had an equal chance of winning. The draft lottery was won by Baltimore, who selected quarterback George Shaw.

== Player selections ==
| = Pro Bowler | = Hall of Famer |

=== Round 1 ===
| Pick # | NFL team | Player | Position | College |
|---|---|---|---|---|
| 1 | Baltimore Colts ^{(Lottery bonus pick)} | George Shaw | Quarterback | Oregon |
| 2 | Chicago Cardinals | Max Boydston | End | Oklahoma |
| 3 | Baltimore Colts | Alan Ameche | Fullback | Wisconsin |
| 4 | Washington Redskins | Ralph Guglielmi | Quarterback | Notre Dame |
| 5 | Green Bay Packers | Tom Bettis | Linebacker | Purdue |
| 6 | Pittsburgh Steelers | Frank Varrichione | Tackle | Notre Dame |
| 7 | Los Angeles Rams | Larry Morris | Center | Georgia Tech |
| 8 | New York Giants | Joe Heap | Halfback | Notre Dame |
| 9 | Philadelphia Eagles | Dick Bielski | Fullback | Maryland |
| 10 | San Francisco 49ers | Dicky Moegle | Halfback | Rice |
| 11 | Chicago Bears | Ron Drzewiecki | Halfback | Marquette |
| 12 | Detroit Lions | Dave Middleton | Halfback | Auburn |
| 13 | Cleveland Browns | Kurt Burris | Center | Oklahoma |

=== Round 2 ===
| Pick # | NFL team | Player | Position | College |
|---|---|---|---|---|
| 14 | Chicago Cardinals | Lindon Crow | Cornerback | USC |
| 15 | Los Angeles Rams | Ron Waller | Back | Maryland |
| 16 | Baltimore Colts | Dick Szymanski | Center | Notre Dame |
| 17 | Green Bay Packers | Jim Temp | End | Wisconsin |
| 18 | Los Angeles Rams | Bob Long | Back | UCLA |
| 19 | Los Angeles Rams | Corky Taylor | Back | Kansas State |
| 20 | Los Angeles Rams | Sid Fournet | Tackle | LSU |
| 21 | San Francisco 49ers | Frank Morze | Center | Boston College |
| 22 | Philadelphia Eagles | Buck Lansford | Tackle | Texas |
| 23 | Chicago Bears | Bobby Watkins | Back | Ohio State |
| 24 | Detroit Lions | Jim Salsbury | Guard | UCLA |
| 25 | Cleveland Browns | Dean Renfro | Back | North Texas State |

=== Round 3 ===
| Pick # | NFL team | Player | Position | College |
|---|---|---|---|---|
| 26 | Chicago Cardinals | Mal Hammack | Back | Florida |
| 27 | Baltimore Colts | L. G. Dupree | Back | Baylor |
| 28 | Washington Redskins | Ray Perkins | Back | Syracuse |
| 29 | Green Bay Packers | Buddy Leake | Back | Oklahoma |
| 30 | Pittsburgh Steelers | Ed Bernet | End | SMU |
| 31 | New York Giants | Rosey Grier | Defensive tackle | Penn State |
| 32 | Chicago Cardinals | Tony Pasquesi | Tackle | Notre Dame |
| 33 | Philadelphia Eagles | Frank Eidom | Back | SMU |
| 34 | San Francisco 49ers | Carroll Hardy | Back | Colorado |
| 35 | Cleveland Browns | John Hall | Tackle | Iowa |
| 36 | Detroit Lions | Darris McCord | Tackle | Tennessee |
| 37 | Cleveland Browns | Bobby Freeman | Back | Auburn |

=== Round 4 ===
| Pick # | NFL team | Player | Position | College |
|---|---|---|---|---|
| 38 | Chicago Cardinals | Frank Bernardi | Back | Colorado |
| 39 | Detroit Lions | Gordon Malloy | Back | Miami (FL) |
| 40 | Los Angeles Rams | Tom Feamster | End | Florida State |
| 41 | Cleveland Browns | Paul Reynolds | Back | Notre Dame |
| 42 | Pittsburgh Steelers | Fred Broussard | Center | Northwestern State |
| 43 | Los Angeles Rams | Ed Fouch | Tackle | USC |
| 44 | Baltimore Colts | Jack Patera | Guard | Oregon |
| 45 | San Francisco 49ers | Matt Hazeltine | Center | California |
| 46 | Philadelphia Eagles | Dean Dugger | End | Ohio State |
| 47 | Chicago Bears | Joe O'Malley | End | Georgia |
| 48 | Detroit Lions | Lee Riley | Back | Detroit |
| 49 | Cleveland Browns | Sam Palumbo | Center | Notre Dame |

=== Round 5 ===
| Pick # | NFL team | Player | Position | College |
|---|---|---|---|---|
| 50 | Chicago Cardinals | Mario Da Re | Tackle | USC |
| 51 | Baltimore Colts | George Preas | Guard | VPI |
| 52 | Washington Redskins | Don Glantz | Tackle | Nebraska |
| 53 | Green Bay Packers | Hank Bullough | Guard | Michigan State |
| 54 | Pittsburgh Steelers | George Mason | Tackle | Alabama |
| 55 | Los Angeles Rams | Ed Kelley | Back | Texas |
| 56 | New York Giants | Mel Triplett | Back | Toledo |
| 57 | Philadelphia Eagles | Gene Lamone | Guard | West Virginia |
| 58 | San Francisco 49ers | Eldred Kraemer | Tackle | Pittsburgh |
| 59 | Chicago Bears | Leland Kendall | Tackle | Oklahoma A&M |
| 60 | Detroit Lions | Bud Brooks | Guard | Arkansas |
| 61 | Cleveland Browns | Aramis Dandoy | Back | USC |

=== Round 6 ===
| Pick # | NFL team | Player | Position | College |
|---|---|---|---|---|
| 62 | Chicago Cardinals | Jack Bowersox | Guard | Maryland |
| 63 | Chicago Bears | Dan Shannon | End | Notre Dame |
| 64 | Baltimore Colts | Leo Lewis | Back | Lincoln (MO) |
| 65 | Green Bay Packers | Norm Amundsen | Guard | Wisconsin |
| 66 | Pittsburgh Steelers | Lem Harkey | Back | Emporia State |
| 67 | Los Angeles Rams | Corky Tharp | Back | Alabama |
| 68 | New York Giants | Ron Locklin | End | Wisconsin |
| 69 | San Francisco 49ers | Bobby Luna | Back | Alabama |
| 70 | Philadelphia Eagles | Billy Quinn | Back | Texas |
| 71 | Chicago Bears | Henry Mosely | Back | Morris Brown |
| 72 | Detroit Lions | Elijah Childers | Tackle | Prairie View A&M |
| 73 | Cleveland Browns | Leroy Bolden | Back | Michigan State |

=== Round 7 ===
| Pick # | NFL team | Player | Position | College |
|---|---|---|---|---|
| 74 | Chicago Cardinals | Dave Leggett | Back | Ohio State |
| 75 | Baltimore Colts | Frank McDonald | End | Miami (FL) |
| 76 | Washington Redskins | Erik Christensen | End | Richmond |
| 77 | Green Bay Packers | Bob Clemens | Back | Georgia |
| 78 | Pittsburgh Steelers | Hal Reeve | Tackle | Oregon |
| 79 | Los Angeles Rams | Frank Clayton | Back | USC |
| 80 | Washington Redskins | Ron Marciniak | Guard | Kansas State |
| 81 | Philadelphia Eagles | Bill McKenna | End | Brandeis |
| 82 | San Francisco 49ers | Johnny Dean | Back | VPI |
| 83 | Chicago Bears | Bruce Sturgess | Back | William & Mary |
| 84 | Detroit Lions | Bert Zagers | Back | Michigan State |
| 85 | Cleveland Browns | Jack Locklear | Center | Auburn |

=== Round 8 ===
| Pick # | NFL team | Player | Position | College |
|---|---|---|---|---|
| 86 | Chicago Cardinals | John Irvine | Center | Maryland |
| 87 | Washington Redskins | Johnny Allen | Center | Purdue |
| 88 | Baltimore Colts | Dale Meinert | Guard | Oklahoma A&M |
| 89 | Green Bay Packers | Johnny Crouch | End | TCU |
| 90 | Detroit Lions | Leon Cunningham | Guard | South Carolina |
| 91 | Los Angeles Rams | Billy Teas | Back | Georgia Tech |
| 92 | New York Giants | Jimmy Patton | Back | Ole Miss |
| 93 | San Francisco 49ers | Freddie Meyers | Back | Oklahoma A&M |
| 94 | Philadelphia Eagles | Herman Watson | Tackle | Vanderbilt |
| 95 | Chicago Bears | Gene Verkerk | Tackle | North Texas State |
| 96 | Detroit Lions | Bill Walker | End | Maryland |
| 97 | Detroit Lions | Lamoine Holland | End | Rice |

=== Round 9 ===
| Pick # | NFL team | Player | Position | College |
|---|---|---|---|---|
| 98 | Chicago Cardinals | Charlie McGinty | End | North Texas State |
| 99 | Baltimore Colts | Walter Bryan | Back | Texas Tech |
| 100 | Washington Redskins | John Miller | Tackle | Boston College |
| 101 | Green Bay Packers | Ed Culpepper | Tackle | Alabama |
| 102 | Pittsburgh Steelers | Johnny Unitas | Quarterback | Louisville |
| 103 | Los Angeles Rams | John Witte | Tackle | Oregon State |
| 104 | Baltimore Colts | Bill Evans | Guard | Miami (OH) |
| 105 | Philadelphia Eagles | Von Morgan | End | Abilene Christian |
| 106 | San Francisco 49ers | Fred Preziosio | Tackle | Purdue |
| 107 | Chicago Bears | Jim Lavery | Back | Scranton |
| 108 | Detroit Lions | Walt Jenkins | Tackle | Wayne |
| 109 | Cleveland Browns | Henry Ford | Back | Pittsburgh |

=== Round 10 ===
| Pick # | NFL team | Player | Position | College |
|---|---|---|---|---|
| 110 | Chicago Cardinals | Frank Scaffidi | Tackle | Marquette |
| 111 | Washington Redskins | Tom Louderback | Guard | San Jose State |
| 112 | Los Angeles Rams | Jesse Arnelle | End | Penn State |
| 113 | Green Bay Packers | George Rogers | Tackle | Auburn |
| 114 | Pittsburgh Steelers | Terry Boyle | Tackle | Cincinnati |
| 115 | Los Angeles Rams | Claude Harland | End | Texas Tech |
| 116 | New York Giants | Lea Paslay | Back | Ole Miss |
| 117 | San Francisco 49ers | Ron Aschbacker | End | Oregon State |
| 118 | Philadelphia Eagles | Duke Washington | Back | Washington State |
| 119 | Chicago Bears | John Allen | End | Arizona State |
| 120 | Detroit Lions | Tom Gastall | Back | Boston University |
| 121 | Cleveland Browns | Glen Dillon | End | Pittsburgh |

=== Round 11 ===
| Pick # | NFL team | Player | Position | College |
|---|---|---|---|---|
| 122 | Chicago Cardinals | Tom Pepsin | End | Miami (FL) |
| 123 | Baltimore Colts | Emil Radik | Back | Nebraska–Omaha |
| 124 | Washington Redskins | Larry Parker | Back | North Carolina |
| 125 | Green Bay Packers | Ron Clark | Back | Nebraska |
| 126 | Pittsburgh Steelers | Vic Eaton | Back | Missouri |
| 127 | Los Angeles Rams | Joe Ray | Tackle | UCLA |
| 128 | New York Giants | Bill Hillen | End | West Virginia |
| 129 | Philadelphia Eagles | Bob Hardy | Back | Kentucky |
| 130 | San Francisco 49ers | Rudy Rotella | End | Nebraska–Omaha |
| 131 | Chicago Bears | Tom Redfield | End | Delaware |
| 132 | Detroit Lions | Herb McDermott | Tackle | Iowa State |
| 133 | Cleveland Browns | Eric Knebel | Tackle | SMU |

=== Round 12 ===
| Pick # | NFL team | Player | Position | College |
|---|---|---|---|---|
| 134 | Chicago Cardinals | Dale Sandstrom | Back | Concordia (Moorhead) |
| 135 | Washington Redskins | John Barish | Tackle | Waynesburg |
| 136 | Baltimore Colts | Dick Chorovich | Tackle | Miami (OH) |
| 137 | Green Bay Packers | Art Walker | Tackle | Michigan |
| 138 | Pittsburgh Steelers | Jim Cooke | End | Lincoln (PA) |
| 139 | Los Angeles Rams | Jim Hanifan | End | California |
| 140 | New York Giants | Hank Burnine | End | Missouri |
| 141 | San Francisco 49ers | Lou Palatella | Tackle | Pittsburgh |
| 142 | Philadelphia Eagles | Andy Nacrelli | End | Fordham |
| 143 | Chicago Bears | Clarence Bratt | Back | Wisconsin |
| 144 | Detroit Lions | Dick Goist | Back | Cincinnati |
| 145 | Cleveland Browns | Jack Eaton | Tackle | New Mexico |

=== Round 13 ===
| Pick # | NFL team | Player | Position | College |
|---|---|---|---|---|
| 146 | Chicago Cardinals | Tom McLuckie | Guard | Maryland |
| 147 | Baltimore Colts | Pat Abbruzzi | Back | Rhode Island |
| 148 | Washington Redskins | Len Oniskey | Tackle | Cornell |
| 149 | Green Bay Packers | Ed Adams | Back | South Carolina |
| 150 | Pittsburgh Steelers | Jim Whitmer | Back | Purdue |
| 151 | Los Angeles Rams | Dave Parkinson | Back | Texas |
| 152 | New York Giants | John Damore | Center | Northwestern |
| 153 | Philadelphia Eagles | Jerry Krisher | Center | Ohio State |
| 154 | San Francisco 49ers | Richie Gaskell | End | George Washington |
| 155 | Chicago Bears | Norm Cash | Back | Sul Ross |
| 156 | Detroit Lions | Don Henderson | Tackle | Utah |
| 157 | Cleveland Browns | John Borton | Quarterback | Ohio State |

=== Round 14 ===
| Pick # | NFL team | Player | Position | College |
|---|---|---|---|---|
| 158 | Chicago Cardinals | Gordy Brown | End | Louisiana Tech |
| 159 | Washington Redskins | Tom Braatz | End | Marquette |
| 160 | Baltimore Colts | John Lee | Back | Georgia Tech |
| 161 | Green Bay Packers | Fred Baer | Back | Michigan |
| 162 | Pittsburgh Steelers | Buck Byrne | Guard | John Carroll |
| 163 | Los Angeles Rams | George Elliot | Back | Northeastern State |
| 164 | New York Giants | Elwood Kettler | Back | Texas A&M |
| 165 | San Francisco 49ers | Nick McKeithan | Back | Duke |
| 166 | Philadelphia Eagles | Tommy Bell | Back | Army |
| 167 | Chicago Bears | Ed Nickla | Guard | Tennessee |
| 168 | Detroit Lions | Jerry Gajda | Back | Benedictine |
| 169 | Cleveland Browns | Fred Robinson | Guard | Washington |

=== Round 15 ===
| Pick # | NFL team | Player | Position | College |
|---|---|---|---|---|
| 170 | Chicago Cardinals | Dick Brubaker | End | Ohio State |
| 171 | Baltimore Colts | Gerry Petersen | Tackle | Texas |
| 172 | Washington Redskins | Charles Horton | Back | Vanderbilt |
| 173 | Green Bay Packers | George Machoukas | Center | Toledo |
| 174 | Pittsburgh Steelers | Ellis Duckett | Back | Michigan State |
| 175 | Los Angeles Rams | Bob Hoerning | Back | St. Norbert |
| 176 | New York Giants | Ed Stowers | End | Wake Forest |
| 177 | Philadelphia Eagles | Don Brougher | Center | Maryland |
| 178 | San Francisco 49ers | Burdette Hess | Guard | Idaho |
| 179 | Chicago Bears | J. D. Smith | Back | North Carolina A&T |
| 180 | Detroit Lions | George Atkins | Guard | Auburn |
| 181 | Cleveland Browns | Bob Smith | Back | Nebraska |

=== Round 16 ===
| Pick # | NFL team | Player | Position | College |
|---|---|---|---|---|
| 182 | Chicago Cardinals | Bob Herndon | Back | Oklahoma |
| 183 | Washington Redskins | Hal Norris | Back | California |
| 184 | Baltimore Colts | Dick Laswell | Tackle | TCU |
| 185 | Green Bay Packers | Charlie Brackins | Quarterback | Prairie View A&M |
| 186 | Pittsburgh Steelers | Frank Vincent | Center | Glenville State |
| 187 | Los Angeles Rams | Charley Coates | Tackle | Tulane |
| 188 | New York Giants | Dave Kragthorpe | Guard | Utah State |
| 189 | San Francisco 49ers | Jim Hall | End | Auburn |
| 190 | Philadelphia Eagles | Clyde White | Guard | Clemson |
| 191 | Chicago Cardinals | Al Dennis | End | Middlebury |
| 192 | Detroit Lions | Al Marr | End | Bradley |
| 193 | Cleveland Browns | Don Suchy | Center | Iowa |

=== Round 17 ===
| Pick # | NFL team | Player | Position | College |
|---|---|---|---|---|
| 194 | Chicago Cardinals | Larry White | Center | New Mexico |
| 195 | Baltimore Colts | Wes Clark | Tackle | Mississippi Southern |
| 196 | Washington Redskins | Don Shea | Guard | Georgia |
| 197 | Green Bay Packers | Lynn Beightol | Back | Maryland |
| 198 | Pittsburgh Steelers | Ed Merchant | Back | Miami (OH) |
| 199 | Los Angeles Rams | Gene Mitcham | End | Arizona State |
| 200 | New York Giants | Bob Bills | Back | BYU |
| 201 | Philadelphia Eagles | Nick Maravic | Back | Wake Forest |
| 202 | San Francisco 49ers | Bob Newton | Guard | San Diego State |
| 203 | Chicago Bears | Mel Harrison | Center | Sam Houston State |
| 204 | Detroit Lions | Don Daly | Back | Eastern Kentucky |
| 205 | Cleveland Browns | Bob Leonard | Back | Purdue |

=== Round 18 ===
| Pick # | NFL team | Player | Position | College |
|---|---|---|---|---|
| 206 | Chicago Cardinals | Fred Campbell | Tackle | Duke |
| 207 | Washington Redskins | Don Bailey | Back | Penn State |
| 208 | Baltimore Colts | Charley Shephard | Back | North Texas State |
| 209 | Green Bay Packers | Doyle Nix | Back | SMU |
| 210 | Pittsburgh Steelers | Albie Maier | Guard | Marshall |
| 211 | Los Angeles Rams | Clyde Sweeney | Tackle | West Virginia |
| 212 | New York Giants | Joe Stout | Back | Temple |
| 213 | San Francisco 49ers | Ron Pheister | Center | Oregon |
| 214 | Philadelphia Eagles | Duane Nutt | Back | SMU |
| 215 | Chicago Bears | Claude Roach | Guard | TCU |
| 216 | Detroit Lions | Pat Oleksiak | Back | Tennessee |
| 217 | Cleveland Browns | Steve Champlin | Tackle | Oklahoma |

=== Round 19 ===
| Pick # | NFL team | Player | Position | College |
|---|---|---|---|---|
| 218 | Chicago Cardinals | Dick Coy | Tackle | St. John's (MN) |
| 219 | Baltimore Colts | Jim Cobb | Tackle | Abilene Christian |
| 220 | Washington Redskins | Bob Dee | End | Holy Cross |
| 221 | Green Bay Packers | Bob Carter | Tackle | Grambling State |
| 222 | Pittsburgh Steelers | Ed Smith | Back | Texas Southern |
| 223 | Los Angeles Rams | John Davis | End | Miles |
| 224 | New York Giants | John Jacobs | End | Colby |
| 225 | Philadelphia Eagles | Terry Fails | End | Vanderbilt |
| 226 | San Francisco 49ers | John Garzoli | Tackle | California |
| 227 | Chicago Bears | Allen Jones | Back | Baylor |
| 228 | Detroit Lions | Bob Muller | Linebacker | Eastern Kentucky |
| 229 | Cleveland Browns | Tom Ebert | End | Kansas State |

=== Round 20 ===
| Pick # | NFL team | Player | Position | College |
|---|---|---|---|---|
| 230 | Chicago Cardinals | Jim Burst | Back | Washington University |
| 231 | Washington Redskins | Ron Geyer | Tackle | Michigan |
| 232 | Baltimore Colts | Charles Cianciola | End | Lawrence |
| 233 | Green Bay Packers | Carl Bolt | Back | Mississippi Southern |
| 234 | Pittsburgh Steelers | Lou Matykiewicz | End | Iowa |
| 235 | Los Angeles Rams | Jack Muldowney | Tackle | Dayton |
| 236 | Green Bay Packers | Bob Antkowiak | End | Bucknell |
| 237 | San Francisco 49ers | Glen Dyer | Back | Texas |
| 238 | Philadelphia Eagles | Jimmy Wade | Back | Tennessee |
| 239 | Chicago Bears | Joe James | Tackle | Howard Payne |
| 240 | Detroit Lions | Fred K. Mahaffey | Back | Denver |
| 241 | Cleveland Browns | William L. Proctor | Tackle | Florida State |

=== Round 21 ===
| Pick # | NFL team | Player | Position | College |
|---|---|---|---|---|
| 242 | Chicago Cardinals | Howie Wright | Back | VPI |
| 243 | Baltimore Colts | Nick Manych | End | Eastern Michigan |
| 244 | Washington Redskins | Buck George | Back | Clemson |
| 245 | Green Bay Packers | Lavell Isbell | Tackle | Houston |
| 246 | Pittsburgh Steelers | Rees Phenix | Tackle | Georgia Tech |
| 247 | Los Angeles Rams | Jerry Cvengros | Tackle | Wisconsin |
| 248 | New York Giants | Gary Dildy | Center | LSU |
| 249 | Philadelphia Eagles | John Anderson | End | Kansas |
| 250 | San Francisco 49ers | George Maderos | End | Chico State |
| 251 | Chicago Bears | Choyce Hall | Center | Midwestern State |
| 252 | Detroit Lions | Jim Walters | Tackle | Ole Miss |
| 253 | Cleveland Browns | Rick Spinks | Back | Texas Tech |

=== Round 22 ===
| Pick # | NFL team | Player | Position | College |
|---|---|---|---|---|
| 254 | Chicago Cardinals | Vic Berra | End | Montana State |
| 255 | Washington Redskins | Joe Boland | Back | George Washington |
| 256 | Baltimore Colts | Jerry Welch | Back | South Dakota State |
| 257 | Green Bay Packers | Bill Brunner | Back | Arkansas Tech |
| 258 | Pittsburgh Steelers | Richie McCabe | Back | Pittsburgh |
| 259 | Los Angeles Rams | Ken Elmore | Tackle | Texas Tech |
| 260 | New York Giants | Al Doggett | Back | Louisiana State |
| 261 | San Francisco 49ers | Pete Vann | Quarterback | Army |
| 262 | Philadelphia Eagles | Ernie Lewis | Guard | Arizona |
| 263 | Chicago Bears | Carl Allison | Back | Oklahoma |
| 264 | Detroit Lions | George Albrecht | Back | Maryland |
| 265 | Cleveland Browns | Jerry Stone | Tackle | Southeastern Louisiana |

=== Round 23 ===
| Pick # | NFL team | Player | Position | College |
|---|---|---|---|---|
| 266 | Chicago Cardinals | Karl Bays | Tackle | Eastern Kentucky |
| 267 | Baltimore Colts | Dick McNamara | Back | Minnesota |
| 268 | Washington Redskins | Chick Donaldson | Center | West Virginia |
| 269 | Green Bay Packers | Elton Shaw | Tackle | Louisiana State |
| 270 | Pittsburgh Steelers | Gordy Holz | Tackle | Minnesota |
| 271 | Los Angeles Rams | George Medved | Tackle | Florida |
| 272 | New York Giants | Jerry Callahan | Back | Colorado State |
| 273 | Philadelphia Eagles | Cecil Ingram | Back | Alabama |
| 274 | San Francisco 49ers | Tom Gunnari | End | Washington State |
| 275 | Chicago Bears | Jerry Barger | Back | Duke |
| 276 | Detroit Lions | George Galuska | Back | Wyoming |
| 277 | Cleveland Browns | Jim Greer | End | Elizabeth City State |

=== Round 24 ===
| Pick # | NFL team | Player | Position | College |
|---|---|---|---|---|
| 278 | Chicago Cardinals | Max Pierce | Back | Utah |
| 279 | Washington Redskins | Bob Ready | Tackle | Notre Dame |
| 280 | Baltimore Colts | Alex Esquivel | Back | Mexico City College |
| 281 | Green Bay Packers | Charley Bryant | Guard | Nebraska |
| 282 | Pittsburgh Steelers | Mike Mayock | End | Villanova |
| 283 | Los Angeles Rams | Bill Andrews | Back | Trinity (TX) |
| 284 | New York Giants | Matt Vujevich | Back | San Jose State |
| 285 | San Francisco 49ers | Bob Heaston | Guard | Cal Poly-San Luis Obispo |
| 286 | Philadelphia Eagles | Vic "Hootie" Postula | Back | Michigan State |
| 287 | Chicago Bears | Joe Young | End | Marquette |
| 288 | Detroit Lions | Bob Flacke | Guard | Holy Cross |
| 289 | Cleveland Browns | John Matsock | Back | Michigan State |

=== Round 25 ===
| Pick # | NFL team | Player | Position | College |
|---|---|---|---|---|
| 290 | Chicago Cardinals | Bob Scott | End | Evansville |
| 291 | Baltimore Colts | Dick Grann | Tackle | Rhode Island |
| 292 | Washington Redskins | Frank Radella | Center | Wyoming |
| 293 | Green Bay Packers | Nate Borden | End | Indiana |
| 294 | Pittsburgh Steelers | Charlie Bull | Guard | Missouri |
| 295 | Los Angeles Rams | Ralph Cook | Tackle | Ball State |
| 296 | New York Giants | Ken Dement | Tackle | Southeast Missouri State |
| 297 | Philadelphia Eagles | Frank Pavich | Guard | USC |
| 298 | San Francisco 49ers | Dewey Wade | End | Kansas State |
| 299 | Chicago Bears | Charley Dees | Tackle | Tyler J.C. |
| 300 | Detroit Lions | Dick Miller | Tackle | Illinois |
| 301 | Cleveland Browns | Ernie Lindo | Back | Pacific |

=== Round 26 ===
| Pick # | NFL team | Player | Position | College |
|---|---|---|---|---|
| 302 | Chicago Cardinals | Billy Hooper | Back | Baylor |
| 303 | Washington Redskins | Walt Houston | Guard | Purdue |
| 304 | Baltimore Colts | Marion Minker | Tackle | Bucknell |
| 305 | Green Bay Packers | Jim Jennings | End | Missouri |
| 306 | Pittsburgh Steelers | Jim Soltau | End | Minnesota |
| 307 | Los Angeles Rams | Lou Hallow | Center | Wake Forest |
| 308 | New York Giants | Abe Cohen | Guard | Tennessee-Chattanooga |
| 309 | San Francisco 49ers | Johnny Kerr | End | Purdue |
| 310 | Philadelphia Eagles | George Palachunik | Guard | Maryland |
| 311 | Chicago Bears | Perry Jeter | Back | Cal Poly-San Luis Obispo |
| 312 | Detroit Lions | Duncan McDonald | Back | Michigan |
| 313 | Cleveland Browns | Don Fife | Center | Purdue |

=== Round 27 ===
| Pick # | NFL team | Player | Position | College |
|---|---|---|---|---|
| 314 | Chicago Cardinals | Bruce Schwager | Tackle | Merchant Marine |
| 315 | Baltimore Colts | Jim Locke | Tackle | Virginia Tech |
| 316 | Washington Redskins | A. J. Baker | Back | Arkansas |
| 317 | Green Bay Packers | Bob Peringer | End | Washington State |
| 318 | Pittsburgh Steelers | Bill Sanford | Back | Hofstra |
| 319 | Los Angeles Rams | Bruce Nevitt | Center | Washington State |
| 320 | New York Giants | Paul Blanda | Back | Pittsburgh |
| 321 | Philadelphia Eagles | Bob Gingrass | Back | Wisconsin |
| 322 | San Francisco 49ers | Dick Shockey | Back | Marquette |
| 323 | Chicago Bears | Joel Kinley | Guard | Tennessee |
| 324 | Detroit Lions | Mike Troka | Back | Trinity (CT) |
| 325 | Cleveland Browns | Bobby Baldwin | Back | Sam Houston State |

=== Round 28 ===
| Pick # | NFL team | Player | Position | College |
|---|---|---|---|---|
| 326 | Chicago Cardinals | Bob Ems | Back | Southern Illinois |
| 327 | Washington Redskins | Arch Cassidy | Tackle | Florida |
| 328 | Baltimore Colts | Bob Meyer | Tackle | Ohio State |
| 329 | Green Bay Packers | Jack Spears | Tackle | Tennessee-Chattanooga |
| 330 | Pittsburgh Steelers | Dave Williams | Guard | Ohio State |
| 331 | Los Angeles Rams | Jim Hoffman | Back | Cincinnati |
| 332 | New York Giants | Al Crow | Tackle | William & Mary |
| 333 | San Francisco 49ers | Don Sanders | Back | Stanford |
| 334 | Philadelphia Eagles | Wingo Avery | Center | Clemson |
| 335 | Chicago Bears | Charley Wright | End | Prairie View A&M |
| 336 | Detroit Lions | Harry Lovell | Guard | South Carolina |
| 337 | Cleveland Browns | Ed Tokus | End | Georgia |

=== Round 29 ===
| Pick # | NFL team | Player | Position | College |
|---|---|---|---|---|
| 338 | Chicago Cardinals | Gene Renzi | Tackle | Northeastern |
| 339 | Baltimore Colts | Bill Waters | Tackle | Austin |
| 340 | Washington Redskins | Bing Bordier | End | USC |
| 341 | Green Bay Packers | Sam Pino | Back | Boston University |
| 342 | Pittsburgh Steelers | Bernie Sinclair | End | Texas A&M |
| 343 | Los Angeles Rams | Bob Howe | Back | Cincinnati |
| 344 | New York Giants | Harold Jackson | Back | Southern |
| 345 | Philadelphia Eagles | Ron Lloyd | Tackle | Bucknell |
| 346 | San Francisco 49ers | Otto Kniedinger | Tackle | Penn State |
| 347 | Chicago Bears | Dick Klein | Tackle | Iowa |
| 348 | Detroit Lions | Bill Dearing | Back | Florida |
| 349 | Cleveland Browns | Ted "Tex" Robinson | Back | Temple |

=== Round 30 ===
| Pick # | NFL team | Player | Position | College |
|---|---|---|---|---|
| 350 | Chicago Cardinals | Bob Sweet | Back | Trinity (TX) |
| 351 | Washington Redskins | Tom Petty | End | Virginia Tech |
| 352 | Green Bay Packers | Bob Saia | Back | Tulane |
| 353 | Pittsburgh Steelers | Jim Caruzzi | Back | Marquette |
| 354 | Los Angeles Rams | K. C. Jones | End | San Francisco |
| 355 | New York Giants | Bill Toole | Back | Oregon |
| 356 | San Francisco 49ers | Bob Gongola | Back | Illinois |
| 357 | Philadelphia Eagles | Dave Finney | Back | Texas Christian |
| 358 | Chicago Bears | Jerry Fouts | Back | Midwestern State (TX) |
| 359 | Detroit Lions | Charley Hatch | End | Utah State |
| 360 | Cleveland Browns | Lamar Leachman | Center | Tennessee |

| = Pro Bowler | = Hall of Famer |

== Hall of Famers ==
- Johnny Unitas, quarterback from the University of Louisville taken 9th round 102nd overall by the Pittsburgh Steelers.

Inducted: Professional Football Hall of Fame class of 1979.

== Notable undrafted players ==
| ^{†} | = Pro Bowler |

| Original NFL team | Player | Pos. | College | Notes |
|---|---|---|---|---|
| Chicago Cardinals | Jimmy Carr | RB | Morris Harvey College | |
| Chicago Cardinals | Jimmy Hill ^{†} | CB | Sam Houston State | |
| Cleveland Browns | Chuck Weber | LB | West Chester (PA) | |
| Los Angeles Rams | Don Burroughs | DB | Colorado State | |
| Pittsburgh Steelers | Willie McClung | DT | Florida A&M | |
| Pittsburgh Steelers | John Reger ^{†} | LB | Pittsburgh | |
