= 1955 Green Bay Packers season =

NFL team season

- General manager: Verne Lewellen
- Head coach: Lisle Blackbourn
- Home stadium: City Stadium; Milwaukee County Stadium

Results
- Record: 6–6
- Division place: 3rd NFL Western
- Playoffs: Did not qualify

The 1955 Green Bay Packers season was their 37th season overall and their 35th season in the National Football League (NFL). The team finished with a 6–6 record under second-year head coach Lisle Blackbourn, earning them a third-place finish in the Western Conference.

Program for the 1955 season opener against the Detroit Lions with the Packers implicitly in the role of David.

Program welcoming home former Wisconsin All-American Don Ameche, fullback of the Baltimore Colts.

== Offseason ==
=== NFL draft ===
Round	Pick	Player	Position	School/club team
1	5	Tom Bettis	Linebacker	Purdue
2	17	Jim Temp	Defensive end	Wisconsin
3	29	Buddy Leake	Back	Oklahoma
5	53	Hank Bullough	Guard	Michigan State
6	65	Norm Amundsen	Guard	Wisconsin
7	77	Bob Clemens	Fullback	Georgia
8	89	Johnny Crouch	End	TCU
9	101	Ed Culpepper	Tackle	Alabama
10	113	George Rogers	Tackle	Auburn
11	125	Ron Clark	Back	Nebraska
12	137	Art Walker	Tackle	Michigan
13	149	Ed Adams	Back	South Carolina
14	161	Fred Baer	Fullback	Michigan
15	173	George Machoukas	Center	Toledo
16	185	Charlie Brackins	Quarterback	Prairie View A&M
17	197	Lynn Beightol	Back	Maryland
18	209	Doyle Nix	Defensive back	SMU
19	221	Bob Carter	Tackle	Grambling
20	233	Carl Bolt	Back	Southern Miss
20	236	Bob Antkowiak	End	Bucknell
21	245	Lavell Isbell	Tackle	Houston
22	257	Bill Brunner	Back	Arkansas Tech
23	269	Elton Shaw	Tackle	LSU
24	281	Charley Bryant	Guard	Nebraska
25	293	Nate Borden	Defensive end	Indiana
26	305	Jim Jennings	End	Missouri
27	317	Bob Peringer	End	Washington State
28	329	Jack Spears	Tackle	Chattanooga
29	341	Sam Pino	Back	Boston University
30	352	Bob Saia	Back	Tulane

== Regular season ==
=== Schedule ===
Week	Date	Opponent	Result	Record	Venue	Attendance	Recap
1	September 25	**Detroit Lions**	**W** 20–17	1–0	City Stadium	22,217	Recap
2	October 2	**Chicago Bears**	**W** 24–3	2-0	City Stadium	24,662	Recap
3	October 8	**Baltimore Colts**	**L** 20–24	2-1	Milwaukee County Stadium	40,199	Recap
4	October 16	**Los Angeles Rams**	**W** 30–28	3-1	Milwaukee County Stadium	26,960	Recap
5	October 23	at Cleveland Browns	**L** 10–41	3-2	Cleveland Stadium	51,482	Recap
6	October 29	at **Baltimore Colts**	**L** 10–14	3-3	Memorial Stadium	34,411	Recap
7	November 6	at **Chicago Bears**	**L** 52-31	3-4	Wrigley Field	48,890	Recap
8	November 13	Chicago Cardinals	**W** 31–14	4–4	City Stadium	20,104	Recap
9	November 20	**San Francisco 49ers**	**W** 27–21	5–4	Milwaukee County Stadium	19,099	Recap
10	November 24	at **Detroit Lions**	**L** 10–24	5–5	Briggs Stadium	51,685	Recap
11	December 4	at **San Francisco 49ers**	**W** 28–7	6–5	Kezar Stadium	32,897	Recap
12	December 11	at **Los Angeles Rams**	**L** 17–31	6–6	Los Angeles Memorial Coliseum	90,535	Recap
Note: Intra-conference opponents are in **bold** text.

=== Standings ===
NFL Western Conference
	W	L	T	PCT	CONF	PF	PA	STK
Los Angeles Rams	8	3	1	.727	6–3–1	260	231	W3
Chicago Bears	8	4	0	.667	7–3	294	251	W2
Green Bay Packers	6	6	0	.500	5–5	258	276	L1
Baltimore Colts	5	6	1	.455	5–4–1	214	239	L2
San Francisco 49ers	4	8	0	.333	4–6	216	298	W1
Detroit Lions	3	9	0	.250	2–8	230	275	L2

Note: Tie games were not officially counted in the standings until 1972.

== Roster ==
1955 Green Bay Packers final roster
Quarterbacks: 15 Paul Held; 18 Tobin Rote; Running backs: 48 Al Carmichael; 31 Fred Cone K; 37 Howie Ferguson; 40 Joe Johnson; 24 Breezy Reid; 27 Veryl Switzer CB; Receivers: 86 Billy Howton; 84 Gary Knafelc	Offensive linemen: 62 Buddy Brown G; 67 Hank Bullough G; 78 Tom Dahms T; 51 Jim Ringo C; 63 Joe Skibinski G; 61 Jack Spinks G; 53 Dave Stephenson C; 68 Len Szafaryn T; Defensive linemen: 87 Nate Borden DE; 69 Bill Forester MG; 77 Dave Hanner DT; 72 Jerry Helluin DT; 71 Bill Lucky DT; 83 John Martinkovic DE; 81 Pat O'Donahue DE	Linebackers: 58 Tom Bettis; 66 Deral Teteak; 74 Roger Zatkoff; Defensive backs: 20 Billy Bookout CB; 44 Bobby Dillon S; 41 Doyle Nix CB; 47 Val Joe Walker S; Special teams: 80 Dick Deschaine	Reserve list: -- Al Barry G (Military); -- Bobby Garrett QB (Military); -- Gene Knutson DE (IR); -- Max McGee WR/P (Military); 23 Al Romine S (Military); -- Jim Temp DE (IR); 53 George Timberlake LB (Military); -- Gene White CB (Military); Rookies in italics

== Awards, records, and honors ==
- Tobin Rote, NFL Leader, Touchdown Passes, (17)
