= NFL on ABC =

U.S. television series

- The official logo for ABC Sports' coverage of Monday Night Football from 2000–2005.
- Also known as: Monday Night Countdown; Monday Night Football
- Genre: American football game telecasts
- Directed by: Chet Forte (1970–1986); Larry Kamm (1987); Craig Janoff (1988–1999); Drew Esocoff (2000–2005); Chip Dean (2016–2018); Jimmy Platt (2019–2022); Derek Mobley (2023–2024); Artie Kempner (2025–present)
- Presented by: Commentators: Joe Buck (play-by-play); Troy Aikman (color commentator); Reporters: Lisa Salters (sideline); Laura Rutledge (sideline); Rules analyst: Russell Yurk; Studio: Scott Van Pelt; Chris Berman; Jason McCourty; Pat McAfee; Jason Kelce; Marcus Spears
- Theme music composer: "Score" by Bob's Band (1970–1975) "Heavy Action" by Johnny Pearson (1976–2006 and 2016–present)
- Opening theme: "All My Rowdy Friends Are Here on Monday Night" by Hank Williams Jr. (1989–2005) "Rip It Up" by Little Richard feat. Butcher Brown (2020–2021) "In the Air Tonight" by Phil Collins feat. Chris Stapleton, Cindy Blackman Santana and Snoop Dogg (2023–2025) "In the Air Tonight" by Phil Collins feat. Chris Stapleton, Cindy Blackman Santana and Ludacris (2026–present)
- Country of origin: United States
- Original language: English
- No. of seasons: 50 (through 2026 season)
- No. of episodes: 1,000+

Production
- Executive producer: Norby Williamson (2016–2024)
- Producers: Steve Ackels; Roger Lewin; Jay Rothman; Lisa Salters
- Production locations: Various NFL stadiums (game telecasts); ESPN Headquarters; Bristol, Connecticut (pre-game, halftime and post-game shows); ABC and ESPN Studio; 7 Hudson Square, Manhattan, New York City (alternate pre-game, halftime and post-game shows)
- Camera setup: Multi-camera
- Running time: 210 minutes or until game ends (inc. adverts)
- Production companies: National Football League; ABC Sports (1970–2006); ESPN (2016–present)

Original release
- Network: ABC
- Release: December 19, 1948 – December 24, 1950
- Release: September 21, 1970 – February 5, 2006
- Release: January 9, 2016 – present

Related
- NFL on ESPN; NFL Network Exclusive Game Series; American Football League on ABC; Football Sunday on ESPN Radio

The American Broadcasting Company (ABC) television network has nationally broadcast National Football League (NFL) games in various stints throughout its history. ABC's first stint, which lasted from 1948 to 1950, involved a "game of the week" format and the NFL Championship Game; it also owned broadcast rights for up to three teams from 1952 to 1954. ABC started airing NFL games again with the debut of Monday Night Football in 1970; it became part of the Super Bowl broadcasting rotation in 1985 and started annually airing two NFL Wild Card playoff games in 1991.

Following ABC's broadcast of Super Bowl XL, ESPN took over as the exclusive rights holder to Monday Night Football in 2006, and the ABC Sports division was merged into ESPN Inc. by parent company Disney. Afterward, ABC did not broadcast any game from the NFL until it simulcasted a Wild Card playoff game from ESPN in 2016. ABC would then return to Monday Night Football in 2020, when they aired three games as simulcasts from ESPN.

Since 2020, ABC simulcasts or exclusively airs some Monday Night Football games, two Saturday games during Week 18, one Wild Card playoff game, and the Pro Bowl in conjunction with ESPN. Beginning in 2023, ABC and ESPN will simulcast one divisional playoff game, and both networks will air the Super Bowl in 2027 and 2031. All games since 2016, whether a simulcast or an exclusive broadcast, have used ESPN branding and graphics.

== History ==
=== Prior to Monday Night Football ===
ABC began television professional football in 1948, where the network used a "game of the week" format to broadcast the NFL. Later that year, the network broadcast the NFL Championship Game between the Chicago Cardinals at Philadelphia Eagles with Harry Wismer providing commentary. The 1949 NFL Championship Game between the Eagles and Los Angeles Rams in Los Angeles was only made available to viewers on the West Coast because at the time, there was no way to send live television programs from the West Coast to the East Coast and vice versa. ABC the following year, would broadcast the playoff game between the New York Giants and Cleveland Browns. For the 1950 NFL Championship Game between the Browns and Rams, the game was not televised to Chicago, but it was so in Los Angeles.

Beginning in 1951, the DuMont network for all intents and purposes, replaced ABC as the NFL's prime network telecaster. However, come 1953, ABC was able to sign contracts with the Chicago Bears, Chicago Cardinals. They would soon add the Washington Redskins beginning in 1954, and come 1955, the Los Angeles Rams and San Francisco 49ers. Red Grange and Bill Fay typically called home games for the Bears and Cardinals in Chicago. For Washington Redskins games, ABC usually used the broadcast crew of Bob Wolff and Dutch Bergman. In 1955, the Redskins left ABC in favor of syndicated regional coverage that was sponsored and produced by Amoco Gasoline.

As previously mentioned, also in 1955, ABC picked up games featuring the Los Angeles Rams and San Francisco 49ers and broadcast them specifically to their affiliates in the Pacific Time Zone. These games were usually either called by the team of Bob Fouts and Frankie Albert or by Bob Kelley and Bill Brundige. ABC also broadcast that year's Thanksgiving Day game between the Green Bay Packers and Detroit Lions with Harry Wismer and Budd Lynch on the call.

ABC's involvement with the NFL would end the following year with the demise of DuMont as CBS would acquire television rights to all but one of the teams, with the Browns electing to form their own broadcast syndication network. ABC would go on to become the first national broadcaster of the competing American Football League when it debuted in 1960, but it eventually lost the rights to NBC in 1965.

=== Monday Night Football (1970–2005) ===
During negotiations on a new television contract that would begin in 1970, NFL Commissioner Pete Rozelle contacted ABC about signing a weekly Monday night deal. Despite reluctance, ABC would sign a contract for the scheduled games. The first Monday Night Football game on ABC aired on September 21, 1970, between the New York Jets and Cleveland Browns with Howard Cosell, Keith Jackson and Don Meredith in the broadcast booth. However Frank Gifford would replace Jackson in 1971.

In an era with only three television broadcast networks, the series became the longest-running prime-time sports program in television history, and developed into one of television's most valuable franchises. The Cosell-Meredith-Gifford dynamic helped make Monday Night Football a success; it frequently was the number one rated program in the Nielsen ratings. The inimitable style of the group (mostly with Cosell, both loved and hated by the public) distinguished Monday Night Football as a distinct spectacle, and ushered in an era of more colorful broadcasters and 24/7 TV sports coverage.

Meredith left for three seasons (1974–1976) to work with Curt Gowdy at NFL on NBC, then returned to MNF partners Gifford and Cosell. In 1974, Fred Williamson was selected by the ABC as a commentator on Monday Night Football to replace Don Meredith. He was relieved of his duties at the beginning of the regular season, becoming the first MNF personality not to endure for an entire season. He was replaced by the fellow former player (and fellow Gary, Indiana, native) Alex Karras. Karras served three years in that role until leaving after the 1976 season, with his most memorable comment coming in his first game, when he joked that bald Oakland Raiders' lineman Otis Sistrunk, who never attended college, was from "the University of Mars", after seeing steam coming off his head.

Prior to 1978, Monday night games were not scheduled in the final week (Week 14) of the regular season. From 1974 to 1977, a Saturday night game was scheduled for Week 14, and televised live by ABC, in lieu of a game on Monday night.

During a game between the Miami Dolphins and New England Patriots on December 8, 1980, Cosell broke the news that former Beatle John Lennon had been shot and killed, news that stunned a nationwide audience.

==== 1982–1989 ====
As part of the renewal of the NFL's television contract in 1982, ABC was put in the Super Bowl rotation for the first time, giving it the broadcast rights to Super Bowl XIX in 1985. A second renewal of the television contract gave them the rights to Super Bowl XXII in 1988. Don Meredith retired from sportscasting after the 1984 season, a year after Howard Cosell's retirement. His final broadcast was Super Bowl XIX with Frank Gifford and Joe Theismann.

From 1983 to 1986, ABC also aired a Friday night game in the final week (Week 16) of the regular season, in addition to the normal Monday night game.

During the first half of the September 5, 1983 Monday Night Football game between the Dallas Cowboys and Washington Redskins, Cosell's commentary on wide receiver Alvin Garrett included "That little monkey gets loose doesn't he?" Cosell's references to Garrett as a "little monkey," ignited a racial controversy that laid the groundwork for Cosell's departure from MNF at the end of the 1983 season. The Rev. Joseph Lowery, then-president of the Southern Christian Leadership Conference, denounced Cosell's comment as racist and demanded a public apology. Despite supportive statements by Jesse Jackson, Muhammad Ali, and Alvin Garrett himself, the fallout contributed to Cosell's decision to leave Monday Night Football following the 1983 season.

"I liked Howard Cosell," Garrett said. "I didn't feel that it was a demeaning statement." Cosell explained that Garrett's small stature, and not his race, was the basis for his comment, citing the fact that he had used the term to describe his own grandchildren. Among other evidence to support Cosell's claim is video footage of a 1972 preseason game between the New York Giants and the Kansas City Chiefs that features Cosell referring to athlete Mike Adamle, a 5-foot, 8-inch, 195-pound Caucasian, as a "little monkey."

On November 18, 1985, Joe Theismann suffered a comminuted compound fracture of the tibia and fibula in his right leg during a sack by linebackers Lawrence Taylor and Harry Carson during a Monday Night Football game between the Washington Redskins and the New York Giants. The Monday Night Football announcer team of Frank Gifford, O. J. Simpson and Joe Namath had correctly inferred from the start that Taylor was calling for help. While initially only the players on the field could see the extent of the damage to Theismann's leg, the reverse-angle instant replay provided a clearer view of what had actually happened: Theismann's lower leg bones were broken midway between his knee and his ankle, such that his leg from his foot to his mid-shin was lying flat against the ground while the upper part of his shin up to his knee was at a 45-degree angle to the lower part of his leg. ABC's decision to screen the reverse-angle instant replay several times despite its palpably graphic content shocked millions of viewers, although as the replays were shown, Gifford repeatedly urged viewers at home to exercise discretion. The repeated screening of this replay remains to this day one of the most controversial in-game television production decisions in NFL history.

In 1986, Al Michaels took over play-by-play duties, and Gifford switched to a color commentator role. However, Gifford did play-by-play for the next several years (Gifford was joined by Lynn Swann and O. J. Simpson on color commentary in 1986 and by Dan Dierdorf for the rest of his run on Monday Night Football) whenever Michaels was covering post-season baseball games for the network.

As previously mentioned, in April 1987, Dan Dierdorf was hired by ABC to join Al Michaels and Frank Gifford on Monday Night Football broadcasts. He spent 12 seasons on Monday Night Football before resigning the post in early 1999.

On October 26, 1987, Gary Bender along with Lynn Swann called the Monday Night Football game between the Denver Broncos and the Minnesota Vikings. That game had been scheduled for October 25, but when the Minnesota Twins (who at the time, shared the Hubert H. Humphrey Metrodome with the Vikings) played Game 7 of the World Series that day, the football game was moved to Monday and shown to a regional audience. The game was therefore, only made available to the Minneapolis and Denver markets while the rest of the nation would see the game between the Los Angeles Rams and the Cleveland Browns.

As part of the league's television contract renewal with the network in 1989, ABC was awarded the television rights to Super Bowl XXV (at the end of the 1990 season) and Super Bowl XXIX (at the end of the 1994 season), as well as one Wild Card game from each conference, during the first Saturday of the NFL playoffs.

==== 1990–2005 ====
From 1990 until 2005, the package included seventeen (eighteen in 1992 and 1993) regular season games, the first two wild card playoff games (held on the first Saturday of the playoffs), and at times, the AFC–NFC Pro Bowl. Beginning in 2003, ABC dropped the Week 17 game in favor of the opening Thursday night game, which was part of sister channel ESPN the year before.

Frank Gifford was replaced in the broadcast booth by Boomer Esiason in 1998. That season, he was reassigned to a nominal role for ABC's Monday night pregame show, but the program was cancelled after one season. Gifford was not offered a new role by the network.

Prior to 1998, MNF aired at 9:00 p.m. ET. Beginning in 1998 however, the game was moved to an 8:20 p.m. ET kickoff. Former Cincinnati Bengals quarterback Boomer Esiason replaced Gifford in 1998, and Dan Dierdorf was dropped after that season. Esiason was dismissed after the 1999 season due primarily to personal conflicts between him and Al Michaels.

After his time at NBC, producer Don Ohlmeyer was lured out of retirement in 2000 to spark interest and provide some vigor to the MNF broadcast. Besides the on-air talent, Ohlmeyer's changes included clips of players introducing themselves, new graphics, use of a sideline Steadicam, and music. In another temporary change, the score bug used nicknames of teams, such as "Skins" and "Fins", instead of the teams' actual names or cities (the Washington Redskins and Miami Dolphins, in this instance). He also made the controversial decision to hire comedian Dennis Miller to join Al Michaels and Dan Fouts in the broadcast booth, an experiment widely regarded in hindsight as a failure.

Ohlmeyer left Monday Night Football after one season. Ratings for the program had dropped 7% compared to the previous year.

Despite having hired Miller and Fouts for another year, ABC began negotiations with veteran football commentator John Madden. Madden had worked at Fox Sports for eight years since the network had won the contract for the NFC Conference games away from CBS in 1994. Since getting the NFL contract, Fox had lost $4.4 billion (losing $387 million due to the contract in 2001 alone), and was looking to cut programming costs. Madden's contract for the next year would cost Fox $8 million so, when ABC was approaching Madden, Fox agreed to let him out of his remaining year on their contract. Despite having been hired for another year, Miller and Fouts were replaced by Madden, who was signed on February 28, 2002, for $5 million a year for four years. (Fouts remained with ABC, being moved to cover college football; Miller was let go.)

The final exclusive Monday Night Football broadcast on ABC aired on December 26, 2005, when the New York Jets, who coincidentally played in the first MNF game, hosted the New England Patriots. ABC's final NFL telecast as part of their Monday Night Football contract would be Super Bowl XL in on February 5, 2006, between the Seattle Seahawks and Pittsburgh Steelers. Following the 2005 season, Monday Night Football would move exclusively to ESPN.

==== Postseason coverage (1984–2005) ====
===== Super Bowl =====
As a result of the 1982 television contract signed by the NFL with the three networks, Super Bowl XIX to be televised by ABC, as they earned their first turn at the Super Bowl, with a new alternation process started for the 1983 game. Previously, the Super Bowl telecast alternated between CBS and NBC, while the networks simulcast the first AFL-NFL World Championship Game. Monday Night Football, happened to be celebrating its 15th season in 1984. Two more ABC-aired Super Bowls would occur during major anniversary seasons for MNF – Super Bowl XXIX (also won by the San Francisco 49ers) closed out the 25th anniversary season (1994), and Super Bowl XXXIV (won by the St. Louis Rams, division rivals of the 49ers) closed out the 30th anniversary season (1999).

Super Bowl XXII was the first with the broadcast team of Al Michaels, Frank Gifford, and Dan Dierdorf in the booth (as the 1987 season was the first year the trio was together, with Dierdorf moving to ABC from CBS; Gifford was the only holdover from ABC's Super Bowl XIX telecast). The trio went on to man the booth for ABC's Monday Night Football from 1987 to 1997 and called Super Bowls XXV and XXIX.

ABC did not broadcast the halftime show for Super Bowl XXV live. Instead, they televised a special ABC News report anchored by Peter Jennings on the progress of the Gulf War. The halftime show was later shown on tape delay after the game at around 10:40 EST, although most ABC affiliates ran the first episode of Davis Rules following the Super Bowl, and may have televised the remaining parts of the halftime show later.

Brent Musburger hosted all the Super Bowl XXIX pregame (2 hours), halftime, and postgame events with the help of then-ABC Sports analyst Dick Vermeil, Musburger's regular color commentator on ABC's college football telecasts, and then-New York Jets quarterback Boomer Esiason. This would be the final Super Bowl hosted by Musburger, as all subsequent Super Bowls on ABC were hosted by ESPN's Chris Berman following the Disney purchase of ABC (which included ESPN), and the subsequent integration of ESPN and ABC Sports (now ESPN on ABC). This was also the last Super Bowl broadcast by the Monday Night Football broadcast team of Michaels, Gifford and Dierdorf.

As previously mentioned, this was the broadcast team for Monday Night Football from 1987 to 1997. They also worked ABC's coverage of Super Bowls XXII and XXV. This would also be the last Super Bowl aired on ABC until the 1999 season (when Al Michaels called the game with Boomer Esiason). Super Bowl XXXIV was the first Super Bowl to be aired in high definition and 5.1 Dolby Digital. ABC Sports chose to use the 720p format.

Super Bowl XXXVII was the first of three major professional sports championship series ABC broadcast in 2003, as they would also broadcast the Stanley Cup Finals and the NBA Finals. Al Michaels handled the play-by-play duties with color commentator John Madden, who became the first person to announce Super Bowls on different networks in consecutive years, having called Super Bowl XXXVI on Fox and then moving to ABC after Pat Summerall retired.

Although the Super Bowl had largely been presented in high definition since Super Bowl XXXIV, Super Bowl XL was the first Super Bowl where all aspects of the game itself were aired in HD.

===== Wild Card Weekend =====
When the NFL expanded its Wild Card round to include a third team in each conference for the 1990 season, this added two additional playoff games to the slate. As such, ABC was given the rights to the Wild Card matchups aired on Saturday during that weekend. The Monday Night Football broadcast team would cover the game that the network regarded as the marquee matchup of the two. The other game was initially broadcast by ABC's #2 college football broadcast team of Brent Musburger and Dick Vermeil. Beginning with the 1996 season, the other game was broadcast by ESPN's Sunday Night Football team. Initially consisting of Mike Patrick, and Joe Theismann, the two were joined by Paul Maguire following NBC's loss of broadcast rights in 1998. The lone exception came in 2002, when Musburger returned to call the AFC wild card game in New York with analyst Gary Danielson.

=== The NFL leaves ABC ===
With the expiration of the television contracts among ABC, CBS, ESPN, and Fox following the 2005 season, Super Bowl XL ended up being ABC's final NFL broadcast as a regular NFL broadcaster. Following the game, Monday Night Football moved to corporate sibling ESPN under the new CBS, Fox, NBC, ESPN, and NFL Network deal, which also saw ESPN and ABC being removed from the Super Bowl rotation.

Monday Night Football became the second major sports package ABC had lost in a span of three years, as not only did they give up national primetime broadcast television rights to NBC, they also gave up the national broadcast television rights to the National Hockey League, coincidentally, to NBC a year prior.

In 2006, during that first year ABC did not air Monday Night Football, ABC and ESPN's parent company Disney decided to integrate the ABC Sports division into ESPN. Since then, ABC's sports programming has been produced by ESPN under the ESPN on ABC branding.

=== The NFL returns to ABC ===
==== Simulcasts of ESPN games (2016–2020) ====
After a cable-only Wild Card playoff game experiment became the least-watched NFL playoff game in 6 years, ESPN announced on May 12, 2015, that beginning with the 2015-16 playoffs, ABC would simulcast ESPN's Wild Card game telecast. This would be ABC's first NFL game since Super Bowl XL. This arrangement has continued every year since.

Beginning with the 2017 season, ABC added a second regular NFL telecast when it began simulcasting ESPN's coverage of the Pro Bowl. Other than the 2021 Pro Bowl, which was cancelled due to the COVID-19 pandemic, ABC has continued this arrangement every year since.

Since 2018, ABC has simulcasted ESPN's coverage of the final day of the NFL Draft. Beginning in 2019 and every year since, ABC has aired a College GameDay branded version of the Draft on the first two days, separate from ESPN's coverage, replacing Fox which simulcast NFL Network's coverage in 2018.

In 2019, during the NFL Scouting Combine, ABC presented a two-hour special that featured drills by quarterbacks and wide receivers. It was the first time the combine was televised on broadcast television.

To celebrate the 50th anniversary of Monday Night Football, and the NFL's arrival in Las Vegas, with the Raiders' relocation, ESPN announced that their Week 2 game on September 21, 2020, would be simulcast on ABC, the network's first MNF regular season game since 2005. The game was also simulcast on ESPN2, as part of ESPN's Megacast series. Later on, ABC simulcast two more late-season MNF games with ESPN, both involving the Buffalo Bills. ABC was also part of ESPN's first ever NFL Playoff Megacast on January 10, 2021. The Megacast saw ABC simulcast ESPN's coverage per usual, with ESPN2, ESPN+, and Disney-owned Freeform, carrying alternate presentations of the game. The Megacast will continue on during the 2022 playoffs as well.

==== New contract (2021–present) ====
Before the 2021 season, ESPN renewed its Monday Night Football contract. As part of the contract, ABC would begin to simulcast a Saturday doubleheader on the final weekend of the season with ESPN beginning in 2021. Then beginning in 2022, ABC would start to exclusively air an additional Monday Night Football game, which would then expand to at least three in 2023. ESPN also gained the rights to a divisional playoff game starting in 2023, and two future Super Bowls, which would all also be simulcast on ABC. ABC would also continue to simulcast ESPN's Wild Card game and the Pro Bowl. ESPN also gained rights for their games to be simulcast on ESPN+, and Megacast on other ESPN and Disney-owned channels.

For the first year of the new contract, in 2021, ESPN announced that their Week 1 Monday Night Football game, coincidentally in Las Vegas, would be simulcast on ABC. The game was also part of the Megacast series. ABC would also simulcast the Week 14 and Week 15 games, along with the previously mentioned Saturday doubleheader.

In February 2022, ABC then aired the yearly NFL Honors awards ceremony. The ceremony is usually aired by the same television network airing the Super Bowl, however NBC, the 2022 Super Bowl broadcaster, was instead airing the 2022 Winter Olympics.

On March 5, 2022, ABC aired a special edition of NFL Live, covering the NFL Combine.

For the second year of the contract in 2022, ABC initially announced on April 8, 2022, that its regular Monday night program, Dancing with the Stars, was moving from ABC to Disney+ for one season (it was later announced that it would be returning to ABC starting the following season). ABC said the show was moved to allow the network to broadcast Monday Night Football on a more regular basis. ABC was then scheduled for seven regular season games, up from five in 2021. Five of these games aired on Monday nights, up from three in 2021, while the other two were part of the final Saturday doubleheader. While six of these seven games were ESPN simulcasts, as part of the second year of the contract ABC exclusively aired the Minnesota Vikings–Philadelphia Eagles game on September 19, 2022. This was the first exclusive NFL game (not simulcast on ESPN) aired on ABC since Super Bowl XL. As this game was part of a split-network doubleheader, with ESPN airing the Tennessee Titans–Buffalo Bills game instead, viewers in the Nashville (Tennessee Titans primary) and Buffalo markets were able to view their teams over-the-air on non-ABC stations.

In 2023, the number of ABC's scheduled regular season games increased from seven to nine. While the ABC/ESPN split-network doubleheaders increased from one to three, the total number of ABC's exclusive games increased to four for this season and 2028 because the network aired the lone Monday Night Football game on December 25 due to ESPN's coverage of NBA Christmas games. The number of ESPN/ABC simulcasts remained at five, including three Monday Night Football games and the final Saturday doubleheader. With New Year's Day also falling on a Monday, the Monday Night Football game that weekend was instead moved to Saturday, December 30. In addition to the Monday night Wild Card game, this was the first postseason that ABC/ESPN aired a divisional playoff game. On September 18, 2023, ABC announced that due to the 2023 Hollywood labor disputes, it would simulcast Monday Night Football every week for the 2023 season. ABC aired 21 games in the 2023 NFL season (15 regular season simulcasts, 4 exclusive games, and 2 postseason simulcasts), its most since 2005.

Initially, in the 2024 season, ABC was scheduled to return to its original 2023 schedule, along with the addition of the Pro Football Hall of Fame Game due to NBC's coverage of the 2024 Summer Olympics. On October 11, 2024, ABC announced it was adding 6 additional Monday Night Football simulcasts for the 2024 NFL season. During the 2024 season, ABC aired 18 games (1 preseason game, 12 regular season simulcasts, 3 exclusive regular season games, and 2 postseason simulcasts).

ABC aired 17 games during the 2025 NFL season (13 regular season simulcasts, 2 exclusive games, and 2 postseason simulcasts). ABC will air Monday Night Football for 11 consecutive weeks from Week 1 to Week 11. The 2025 season is scheduled to be the final year of ABC exclusive games. These games will move to NFL Network, which ESPN is in the process of acquiring, beginning in 2026, assuming regulatory approval. ABC simulcasts will continue.

ABC will air 15 games in 2026, all simulcasts with ESPN, including Super Bowl LXI.

== Commentators ==
=== Current ===
==== Play-by-play ====
1. Joe Buck – lead play-by-play (2022–present)
2. Dave Pasch – #2 play-by-play (2026–present)
3. Bob Wischusen – #3 play-by-play (2026–present)

==== Color commentators ====
1. Troy Aikman – lead color commentator (2022–present)
2. Kurt Warner – #2 color commentator (2026–present)
3. Louis Riddick – #3 color commentator (2026–present); co-#2 color commentator (2019; 2022–2025); co-lead color commentator (2020–2021)

==== Sideline reporters ====
1. Lisa Salters – lead sideline reporter (2015–2024); co-lead sideline reporter (2025–present)
2. Laura Rutledge – fill-in sideline reporter (2020–2024); #2 sideline reporter (2021–2024); co-lead sideline reporter (2025–present)
3. Molly McGrath – #2 sideline reporter (2026–present)
4. Peter Schrager – #3 sideline reporter (2026–present); co-#2 sideline reporter (2025)

==== Rules analyst ====
1. Russell Yurk – lead rules analyst (2024–present)
2. Mike Chase – #2 rules analyst (2026–present)

==== Studio hosts ====
1. Scott Van Pelt – studio host (2023–present)

==== Studio analysts ====
1. Jason McCourty – studio analyst (2026–present)
2. Pat McAfee – studio analyst (2026–present)
3. Jason Kelce – studio analyst (2024–present)
4. Marcus Spears – studio analyst (2023–present)

==== Insiders ====
1. Adam Schefter – lead insider (2015–present)

==== Contributors ====
1. Chris Berman – contributor (2017–present)
2. Katie Feeney – social media contributor (2026–present)

== Other professional football telecasts ==
=== AFL on ABC ===
From 1960 until 1964, ABC broadcast games from the American Football League (AFL). As part of the deal ABC broadcast approximately 37 regular season games, the AFL Championship Game and the AFL All-Star Game. These games were typically broadcast regionally on 15 consecutive Sundays and on Thanksgiving Day. This became the first ever cooperative television plan for professional football, in which the proceeds of the contract were divided equally among member clubs; the National Football League would follow suit in 1961.

=== USFL on ABC ===
From 1983 until 1985, ABC broadcast games from the United States Football League (USFL) As part of the contract ABC televised a Sunday afternoon game-of-the-week, one prime time evening game, plus coverage of the USFL divisional playoffs and championship game. The contract required the USFL to schedule a minimum of three games on Sunday, with ABC guaranteed to broadcast one game nationally (the aforementioned, Sunday afternoon game-of-the-week) or two or more regionally. The contract included no clauses regarding "blackouts" or "cross-feeding". In all, the total package with ABC called for 21 telecasts of USFL action.

=== WLAF on ABC ===
In 1991 and 1992, ABC broadcast select games from the World League of American Football (WLAF). These games mostly aired on Sunday afternoons. ABC also aired the 1991 World Bowl.

==== Commentators ====
- Brent Musburger (play-by-play), Dick Vermeil (color), Mark Jones (sideline), Jack Arute (sideline: World Bowl only). (1991)
- Roger Twibell (play-by-play), Dick Vermeil (color), Jim Valvano (sideline: select games), Julie Moran (sideline: semifinal only). (1992 primary)
- Mark Jones (play-by-play), Tim Brant (color), Julie Moran (sideline: select games). (1992 secondary)

=== Arena Football League on ABC ===
From 1998 to 2002, ABC broadcast the AFL ArenaBowl under their Wide World of Sports umbrella.

In 2007 and 2008, ABC broadcast one regular season game and the ArenaBowl from the Arena Football League as part of ESPN on ABC.

==== Commentators ====
- Play-by-play: Mike Adamle (1998), Mike Gleason (1999–2000), Brent Musburger (2001), Tim Brant (2002), Mike Greenberg (2007), Ron Jaworski (2007), Bob Wischusen (2008)
- Color: Mike Golic (1998, 2007), Merril Hoge (1999, 2007), Ed Cunningham (2000, 2002), Gary Danielson (2001), Shaun King (2008), Marcellus Wiley (2008)
- Reporter: Lewis Johnson (1998), Holly Rowe (1999), Merril Hoge (2000), Lynn Swann (2001–2002), Marcellus Wiley (2008), Stan Verrett (2008)

=== XFL on ABC ===
In 2020, ABC broadcast games from the XFL. ABC was scheduled to air a weekly Saturday game and four Sunday games. However, because of the COVID-19 pandemic, only five of the Saturday games and one of the Sunday games ended up being televised.

On May 17, 2022, Disney announced that the XFL would return to ABC when the league returned to play in 2023. In 2023, ABC aired 8 games, including the 2023 XFL Championship Game in primetime.

==== Commentators ====
2020

- Steve Levy (play-by-play), Greg McElroy (color), Tom Luginbill (sideline analyst), Dianna Russini (sideline reporter). (Saturday games)
- Tom Hart (play-by-play), Joey Galloway (color), Cole Cubelic (sideline analyst), Molly McGrath (sideline reporter). (Sunday games)

2023

- Tom Hart (play-by-play), Greg McElroy (color), Cole Cubelic (sideline analyst), Katie George or Kris Budden (sideline reporter) (6 games)
- Matt Barrie or Roy Philpott (play-by-play), Joey Galloway (color), Eric Mac Lain (sideline analyst), Tiffany Blackmon (sideline reporter) (2 games)

=== UFL on ABC ===
Following the merger of the XFL and USFL into the UFL, the UFL announced that ABC and ESPN had acquired partial television rights to the league along with Fox Sports.

For the 2024 UFL season, ABC aired 9 regular season games and one division championship.

==== Commentators ====
2024

- Mike Monaco or Drew Carter (play-by-play), Sam Acho or Tom Luginbill (analyst), Cole Cubelic (sideline analyst), Stormy Buonantony or Kayla Burton (sideline reporter) (6 games)
- Lowell Galindo (play-by-play), Tom Luginbill (analyst), Harry Douglas or Eric Mac Lain (sideline analyst), Kayla Burton (sideline reporter) (3 games)

2025

- Joe Tessitore or Roy Philpott (play-by-play), Jordan Rodgers (color), Tom Luginbill or Dawn Davenport (sideline analyst), Sam Acho or Eric Mac Lain (sideline analyst) (9 games)
- Roy Philpott or Mark Jones (play-by-play), Roddy Jones (color), Harry Douglas or Aaron Murray (sideline analyst), Cole Cubelic (sideline analyst) (3 games)

== See also ==
- Monday Night Countdown
- Monday Night Football
- ESPN Sunday Night Football
- NBC Sunday Night Football
- NFL on CBS
- NFL on Fox
