= 1955 Baltimore Colts season =

3rd season in franchise history

- Owner: Carroll Rosenbloom
- General manager: Don "Red" Kellett
- Head coach: Weeb Ewbank
- Home stadium: Memorial Stadium

Results
- Record: 5–6–1
- Division place: 4th NFL Western
- Playoffs: Did not qualify

The 1955 Baltimore Colts season was the third season for the team in the National Football League. The Baltimore Colts finished the National Football League's 1955 season with a record of 5 wins, 6 losses and 1 tie and finished fourth in the Western Conference.

Program for the October 23 game against the visiting Washington Redskins.

== Regular season ==
=== Schedule ===
Game	Date	Opponent	Result	Record	Venue	Attendance	Recap	Sources
1	September 25	**Chicago Bears**	**W** 23–17	1–0	Memorial Stadium	36,167	Recap	
2	October 1	**Detroit Lions**	**W** 28–13	2–0	Memorial Stadium	40,030	Recap	
3	October 8	at **Green Bay Packers**	**W** 24–20	3–0	Milwaukee County Stadium	40,199	Recap	
4	October 16	at **Chicago Bears**	**L** 10–38	3–1	Wrigley Field	40,184	Recap	
5	October 23	Washington Redskins	**L** 13–14	3–2	Memorial Stadium	51,587	Recap	
6	October 29	**Green Bay Packers**	**W** 14–10	4–2	Memorial Stadium	34,411	Recap	
7	November 5	at **Detroit Lions**	**L** 14–24	4–3	Briggs Stadium	53,874	Recap	
8	November 13	at New York Giants	**L** 7–17	4–4	Polo Grounds	33,982	Recap	
9	November 20	**Los Angeles Rams**	**T** 17–17	4–4–1	Memorial Stadium	41,146	Recap	
10	November 27	**San Francisco 49ers**	**W** 26–14	5–4–1	Memorial Stadium	33,485	Recap	
11	December 4	at **Los Angeles Rams**	**L** 14–20	5–5–1	L.A. Memorial Coliseum	37,024	Recap	
12	December 11	at **San Francisco 49ers**	**L** 24–35	5–6–1	Kezar Stadium	35,371	Recap	
Note: Intra-conference opponents are in **bold** text.

== Standings ==
NFL Western Conference
	W	L	T	PCT	CONF	PF	PA	STK
Los Angeles Rams	8	3	1	.727	6–3–1	260	231	W3
Chicago Bears	8	4	0	.667	7–3	294	251	W2
Green Bay Packers	6	6	0	.500	5–5	258	276	L1
Baltimore Colts	5	6	1	.455	5–4–1	214	239	L2
San Francisco 49ers	4	8	0	.333	4–6	216	298	W1
Detroit Lions	3	9	0	.250	2–8	230	275	L2

Note: Tie games were not officially counted in the standings until 1972.

== Roster ==
Official team photo of the 1955 Baltimore Colts.

1955 Baltimore Colts roster
Quarterbacks: 18 Gary Kerkorian K; 14 George Shaw; Running backs: 35 Alan Ameche; 45 L. G. Dupre; 31 Burrell Shields; 20 Dean Renfro; 26 Royce Womble; 22 Buddy Young; 24 Dick Young; Receivers: 82 Raymond Berry; 87 Lloyd Colteryahn; 84 Jim Mutscheller	Offensive linemen: 78 Dick Chorovich T; 74 Ken Jackson T; 52 Dick Szymanski C; 72 George Radosevich T; 68 Alex Sandusky G; 63 Art Spinney G; Defensive linemen: 73 Joe Campanella MG/DT; 70 Art Donovan DT; 77 Tom Finnin DT; 76 Don Joyce DE; 75 Gino Marchetti DE; 50 Buzz Nutter DE/LB/C; 61 Jack Patera MG/G; 60 George Preas DE/G	Linebackers: 67 Doug Eggers; 65 Bill Pellington; Defensive backs: 86 Monte Brethauer S/P; 21 Walter Bryan CB; 44 Bert Rechichar S/K; 23 Carl Taseff CB; 40 Jesse Thomas S; 32 Bob White CB	Reserve list: 19 Cotton Davidson QB/P (Military); -- Chuck McMillan S (Military); -- Buck McPhail RB (Military); -- John Rapacz C (IR); 25 Don Shula CB (IR); rookies in italics

== See also ==
- History of the Indianapolis Colts
- Indianapolis Colts seasons
- Colts–Patriots rivalry
