= George Shaw (American football) =

American football player (1933–1998)

- Shaw ahead of the 1957 season

No. 14, 15, 17
- Position: Quarterback

Personal information
- Born: July 25, 1933; Portland, Oregon, U.S.
- Died: January 3, 1998 (aged 64); Portland, Oregon, U.S.
- Listed height: 6 ft 0 in (1.83 m)
- Listed weight: 183 lb (83 kg)

Career information
- High school: Grant (Portland)
- College: Oregon (1950–1954)
- NFL draft: 1955: 1st round, 1st overall pick

Career history
- Baltimore Colts (1955–1958); New York Giants (1959–1960); Minnesota Vikings (1961); Denver Broncos (AFL) (1962)

Awards and highlights
- NFL champion (1958); Second-team All-American (1954); Third-team All-American (1953); Pop Warner Trophy (1954); 3× First-team All-PCC (1951, 1953, 1954)

Career NFL statistics
- Passing attempts: 802
- Passing completions: 405
- Completion percentage: 50.5%
- TD–INT: 41–63
- Passing yards: 5,829
- Passer rating: 58.8
- Rushing yards: 431
- Rushing touchdowns: 6
- Stats at Pro Football Reference

George Howard Shaw (July 25, 1933 – January 3, 1998) was an American professional football player who was a quarterback for seven seasons in the National Football League (NFL) and one season in the rival American Football League (AFL). He played college football for the Oregon Ducks and was the first overall selection of the 1955 NFL draft by the Baltimore Colts, for whom he started 17 consecutive games.

A leg injury to Shaw in 1956 forced the Colts to insert free agent backup Johnny Unitas at quarterback, launching the latter on what would become a Hall of Fame career.

Shaw was part of the Colts team which won the 1958 Championship Playoff over the New York Football Giants in sudden death overtime, long regaled in football lore as "the Greatest Game Ever Played."

== Biography ==
=== Early life ===
George Shaw was born July 25, 1933, in Portland, Oregon. His father had been the operator of a small chain of four or five grocery stores, which were lost during the financial crisis of the Great Depression. He subsequently worked in the produce business.

He attended Grant High School in that city, participating on that school's football team as a quarterback on offense and a defensive back on the other side of the ball. George became the fourth of four Shaw brothers to play football for the Grant team, with his older brother Tom going on to play quarterback for Stanford.

A reserve during his sophomore season, in 1949 and 1950 Shaw led the Grant Generals to two consecutive Oregon state football championships. The undefeated 1949 team caused one observer to write "They must go down in the annals as one of the best state championship teams in history — they looked that good."

The 1949 championship game placed Shaw firmly on the radar of the Oregon Ducks, with the same sports columnist noting: "Oregon's Jim Aiken sat alongside us during the game and between puffs of a cigar that wouldn't stay lit, Gentleman Jim drooled in ecstasy at the Generals' George Shaw, their brilliant junior quarterback. It will be two years before Jim has a chance to lay his hands on the kid, but you could see Aiken was thinking in terms of 1952, '53, and '54 quite often last Saturday."

Shaw and his Grant Generals teammates extended their undefeated streak to 22 games with their defeat of the Marshfield Pirates in the 1950 Oregon state high school championship game held at Multnomah Stadium. Shaw once again starred in the game, highlighted by his 40-yard punt return setting up a 9-yard touchdown pass to end Dick Davenport. Shaw suffered an injury late in the third quarter than severely limited his time on the field for the rest of the contest, but Grant managed to hold on in his absence for a narrow 12–7 victory.

In leading Grant to a second straight Oregon championship, Shaw was named to the first team of the 1950 Oregon All-State team. He was also tabbed as a third team High School All-American for 1950.

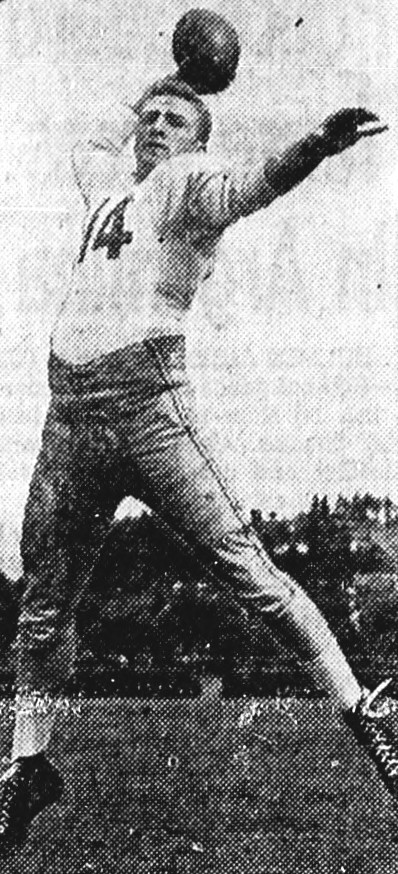
Shaw in 1955.

=== College career ===
Although his early admirer, head coach Jim Aiken, had by then departed, Shaw enrolled at the University of Oregon in 1951. Although generally freshmen were prohibited by NCAA rule from participating in varsity sports, an exception was made in 1951 due to a player shortage associated with the outbreak of the Korean War, so Shaw immediately became a member of the Ducks varsity team. This did not stop Shaw from making his mark, racking up an astounding 13 interceptions as a defensive back for the year — an NCAA record for a 10-game season that would stand for 17 years.

Shaw gained a reputation as a good sport in a violent game, earning him the nickname "Gentleman George" from his teammates. He would frequently help opponents to their feet after a tackle and would very properly address officials as "Mr. Referee."

As a senior in 1954, Shaw led the Ducks to their first winning record since 1948. For the year, Shaw went 91-for-196 (46.4%) passing, with 10 touchdowns, while rushing for three more. His 196 pass attempts were the most in the nation. He finished 8th in balloting for the 1954 Heisman Trophy and won the Pop Warner Trophy as the most valuable senior football player on the Pacific coast.

Shaw was named a 1954 All-American by the Associated Press and Newspaper Enterprise Association, which named him to their third teams, and United Press International, which assigned him second team status. He was also named a member of the All-Pacific Coast Conference team in both 1953 and 1954.

He was also a star baseball player at Oregon, with some prospect of a professional career in that sport.

=== Professional career ===
Beginning in 1947, the National Football League (NFL) conducted a lottery of its members for the right to select the first overall player in that year's draft. Teams winning this special drawing were to be ineligible from winning the choice again in subsequent years. In 1955 it was the turn of the Baltimore Colts to win the top pick, as their slip was selected over those of the Chicago Cardinals, Pittsburgh Steelers, and Green Bay Packers.

The Colts used their windfall pick to make Shaw the first player chosen in 1955 NFL draft. Colts head coach Weeb Ewbank called Shaw "the best quarterback available in the country" and noted that in addition to his passing and rushing prowess, the versatile Oregon star had shown himself to be "an excellent defensive player. Joining Shaw as the Colts' first round selection was Wisconsin fullback Alan Ameche, who would long play a starring role for the team.

A parade of NFL owners made their way to the Colts' table at the draft to make offers for one or both of the top Baltimore picks, since both players had been near the top of most teams' draft list. Coming off a year in which the Colts had finished last in points scored and yards gained, team owner Carroll Rosenbloom quickly put a halt to these efforts to raid his new offensive prospects, however, announcing to the meeting that no such deals would be considered.

Shaw did not rush to come to contract terms with the Colts, however, instead carefully weighing the alternative of signing a professional baseball contract to play as an outfielder for the Boston Red Sox. Despite Colts team president "Red" Kellett flying to the west coast in an effort to obtain Shaw's signature on a contract, Shaw remained insistent on continuing to play baseball through the spring of 1955 with the Oregon Ducks, who had won the pennant for the Northern Division of the Pacific Coast Conference and held hopes of advancing to the College World Series.

The impasse was finally broken on June 16, when Shaw signed a contract to play with the Colts for the 1955 season. Financial terms of the deal were not announced to the press, although permission was granted by the club for Shaw to continue to play baseball for a time if such an opportunity presented itself. The only proviso was that Shaw agreed to report to training camp in Maryland for its scheduled opening on July 16.

Shaw subsequently told Colts publicity director John Steadman that his choice of football over baseball had been practical rather than financial. "I'm going to have to go in the Army in 1957," he said. "I didn't think it made good logic for me to become a bonus player in baseball, sit on the bench for two years and then go in the service. I would have wasted two years. This way, in football, if I'm lucky, I'll gain in experience these two years and I may be better established."

Program from the memorable October 1955 Bears game in which Shaw came back to play despite suffering serious facial injuries.

Although playing rookies in key positions was not typical for head coach Weeb Ewbank, Shaw was quickly made the Colts' starter at quarterback. He generated great excitement among the fanbase by leading the Colts to three straight victories to launch the 1955 Baltimore Colts season. The winning streak was ended in a Week 4 game against the Chicago Bears, in which Shaw suffered a crushing hit that broke his face mask, his nose, and knocked out four teeth. Team trainers came up with some chewing gum that was used to fashion a crude mouthpiece, allowing Shaw to again take the field for the remainder of the team's losing effort.

Shaw finished his rookie season having started 12 of the Colts' 14 games. He ranked statistically in the middle of the league's quarterbacks, passing for 1,586 yards and 10 touchdowns while finishing second in the NFL for quarterback rushing, gaining 301 yards en route to 3 more touchdowns.

On October 21, 1956, in a game against the Chicago Bears in Chicago, Shaw suffered a broken leg and was replaced by backup Johnny Unitas, acquired from the Pittsburgh Steelers where he had been a ninth-round draftee. As Unitas embarked on his legendary career, Shaw lasted two more years in Baltimore as the backup before being traded to the New York Giants, where he played two seasons.

Shaw played one season with the Minnesota Vikings, where he started the first game in franchise history but was replaced during the first half by rookie backup Fran Tarkenton, who took over the starting job.

In 1962 Shaw played one season with the Denver Broncos of the American Football League before retiring from football.

=== Life after football ===
After his time in football, Shaw returned to his native Portland where he worked in a stock brokerage firm, rising to the position of vice president.

=== Death and legacy ===
Shaw died at his home in Portland on January 3, 1998, after a long struggle with bone marrow cancer. He was 64 years old at the time of his death. Family members said he died peacefully in his sleep.

In his 1987 memoir, Art Donovan, his Hall of Fame teammate on the Colts, testified to Shaw's toughness: "In 1955, we had George Shaw at quarterback. George wasn't a big guy, but he was talented, a lot like Francis Tarkenton. We were playing the Bears out in Chicago, and Shaw took a mighty rap as he dropped back to pass. Ed Sprinkle, a grizzly old defensive end...broke through and hit Shaw low. Sprinkle kind of had him around the knees and was holding him up.... [A]s Sprinkle was keeping him upright, linebacker George Connor got about a fifteen-yard head of steam up and bulled through and hit George high, right in the mouth. I mean put a shoulder right in his face and leveled him. Connor broke Shaw's face mask, broke his nose, and knocked his teeth out. George was a mess. They dragged him off the field, and his nose was spurting blood, and he didn't know where he was when he got to the bench.... When George finally regained his senses, he said to Dick Szymanski, 'Hey Syzzie, how do my teeth look?' And Syzzie said, 'I don't know, George — they aren't there.' And you know what? George Shaw went back into that game. There was at least one fat defensive tackle on the Baltimore sidelines that gained a lot of respect for him that day."

== See also ==
- List of NCAA major college football yearly total offense leaders
