= Nathaniel Borden =

Nathaniel Borden may refer to:

- Nate Borden (1932–1992), American footballer
- Nathaniel B. Borden (1801–1865), U.S. politician
