= Duke Bailey =

American gridiron football player (1933–2010)

No. 82, 81
- Position: Quarterback

Personal information
- Born: April 13, 1933; Pittsburgh, Pennsylvania, U.S.
- Died: May 1, 2010 (aged 77); West Chester, Pennsylvania, U.S.
- Listed height: 6 ft 0 in (1.83 m)
- Listed weight: 190 lb (86 kg)

Career information
- High school: Central Catholic (Pittsburgh)
- College: Penn State (1951–1954)
- NFL draft: 1955: 18th round, 207th overall pick

Career history
- Hamilton Tiger-Cats (1955)*; Ottawa Rough Riders (1955); Washington Redskins (1956)*; Calgary Stampeders (1956)
- * Offseason or practice squad member only

Donald "Duke" Patrick Bailey (April 13, 1933 – May 1, 2010) was an American former professional football quarterback who played in the Interprovincial Rugby Football Union (IRFU) with the Ottawa Rough Riders and in the Western Interprovincial Football Union (WIFU) with the Calgary Stampeders. He played college football for the Penn State Nittany Lions.

== Early life ==
Bailey was born on April 13, 1933 in Pittsburgh, Pennsylvania. He attended Central Catholic High School in Pittsburgh.

== College career ==
Bailey played college football for the Penn State Nittany Lions from 1951 to 1954 and was a three-year letterman from 1952 to 1954. As a freshman, he handled the team's kickoff duties while seeing action on select plays. The following year, Bailey played at halfback rushing for 25 yards and catching one pass for 12 yards.

As a junior, he rushed for 14 yards, went five of 14 passing for 35 yards and shared punting duties with Don Eyer and Tony Rados. In 1954, Bailey passed for 393 yards, five touchdowns and two interceptions on 33 of 80 passing with 152 rushing yards. He was named to the 1955 East–West Shrine Game, where he later became the starting quarterback after Ralph Guglielmi fell ill. Bailey scored a rushing touchdown and was the Shrine Game MVP as the East beat the West 13–12.

== Professional career ==
=== Washington Redskins ===
Bailey was selected in the 18th round, with the 207th overall selection, by the Washington Redskins in the 1955 NFL draft. Instead of signing with the team, he went to play in Canada with the Hamilton Tiger-Cats. On June 19, 1956, Bailey signed with the team. He was released before playing in a regular season game.

=== Hamilton Tiger-Cats ===
On March 4, 1955, Bailey was signed by the Hamilton Tiger-Cats of the Interprovincial Rugby Football Union (IRFU). On August 8, he was traded to the Ottawa Rough Riders for guard, Zolton Kovacs.

=== Ottawa Rough Riders ===
Bailey took over the starting quarterback job for the Rough Riders in the 1955 season. He played in five games, completing 19 of 71 passes for 615 yards, seven touchdowns and five interceptions with 104 rushing yards. On October 13, Bailey was released by the team.

=== Calgary Stampeders ===
On September 13, 1956, Bailey signed with the Calgary Stampeders of the Western Interprovincial Football Union (WIFU). On September 22, he made his Stampeders debut, where he completed three of 12 passes for 49 yards and an interception with -12 rushing yards. On September 29, 1956, Bailey was released by the team.

== Personal life ==
After Bailey retired from professional football, he planned to become a coach but instead began working in the steel industry in his hometown, Pittsburgh. He later moved to Berwyn, where he started his own business selling refractories to steel mills. Bailey died of cancer on May 1, 2010, in West Chester.
