= Kenneth Dement =

American football player (1933–2013)

Profile
- Positions: Offensive tackle Defensive tackle

Personal information
- Born: February 13, 1933; Poplar Bluff, Missouri, U.S.
- Died: February 15, 2013 (aged 80); Cape Girardeau, Missouri, U.S.
- Listed height: 6 ft 3 in (1.91 m)
- Listed weight: 212 lb (96 kg)

Career information
- College: Southeast Missouri State University; Washington University in St. Louis
- NFL draft: 1955: 25th round, 296 (by the New York Giants)th overall pick
- College Football Hall of Fame

Kenneth "Redneck" Dement (February 13, 1933 – February 15, 2013) was an American football offensive tackle/defensive tackle. He played college football for Southeast Missouri State University. He was a 25th round selection (296th overall) selection by the New York Giants in the 1955 NFL draft. But instead of playing professionally, Dement joined the United States Marine Corps where he achieved the rank of captain. After his military career, Dement went back to school, earning a law degree at Washington University School of Law in St. Louis. He returned to Sikeston, Missouri where he had grown up and began practicing law. From 1976 until 1981, he served on the Board of Regents for Southeast Missouri State University, including in the role as its president. Dement was once interviewed by Mike Wallace on 60 Minutes regarding a court case. He was elected to the College Football Hall of Fame in 1998. He had six children including one who preceded him in death. Dement died on February 15, 2013, in Cape Girardeau, Missouri. He was 80.
