= 1955 San Francisco 49ers season =

American football team season

- Owner: Tony Morabito
- General manager: Louis Spadia
- Head coach: Red Strader
- Home stadium: Kezar Stadium

Results
- Record: 4–8
- Division place: 5th NFL Western
- Playoffs: Did not qualify

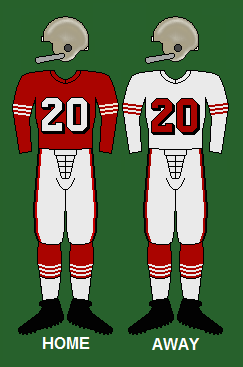
Shows the period uniform the team would have been seen in

The 1955 San Francisco 49ers season was the franchise's 6th season in the National Football League and their 10th overall.

They were coming off a 7–4–1 record in 1954, finishing in 3rd place in the Western Conference.

San Francisco replaced head coach Buck Shaw, who had been the club's only head coach since its founding. The new coach was Red Strader, who had previously been the head coach of the New York Yanks from 1950 to 1951, where he had a record of 8–14–2 in his two seasons there.

The 49ers started the year with 2 losses at home but rebounded with 2 road victories and sat with a .500 record after 4 games. San Francisco split its next 2 games at home and had a 3–3 record. The team then fell into a slump and lost its next 5 games before winning its final game of the season, finishing with a 4–8 record, its worst season since the team's first season in the NFL in 1950, when it finished 3–9.

Offensively, Y. A. Tittle threw for 2185 yards, completing 51.2% of his passes, and had a league-high 17 touchdown passes. However, Tittle had 28 passes that were intercepted. Billy Wilson was Tittle's favorite target, as he had a team-high 53 receptions for 831 yards and 7 touchdowns. Joe Perry led the club by rushing for 701 yards, while Dickie Moegle rushed for a team-high 5 touchdowns.

== Offseason ==
=== NFL draft ===
1955 San Francisco 49ers draft
Round	Pick	Player	Position	College	Notes
1	10	Dicky Moegle *	Defensive back	Rice	
2	21	Frank Morze	Center	Boston College	began play with 49ers in 1957.
3	34	Carroll Hardy	Halfback	Colorado	
4	45	Matt Hazeltine *	Linebacker	California	
5	58	Eldred Kraemer	Guard	Pittsburgh	
6	69	Bobby Luna	Defensive back	Alabama	
7	82	Johnny Dean	Back	VPI	
8	93	Freddie Meyers	Back	Oklahoma A&M	
9	106	Fred Preziosio	Tackle	Purdue	
10	117	Ron Ashbacker	End	Oregon State	
11	130	Rudy Rotella	End	Omaha	
12	141	Lou Palatella	Guard	Pittsburgh	
13	154	Richie Gaskell	End	George Washington	
14	165	Nick McKeithan	Back	Duke	
15	178	Burdette Hess	Guard	Idaho	signed with Calgary Stampeders (WIFU)
16	189	Jim Hall	End	Auburn	
17	202	Bob Newton	Guard	San Diego State	
18	213	Ron Pheister	Center	Oregon	
19	226	John Garzoli	Tackle	California	
20	237	Glen Dyer	Back	Texas	
21	250	George Maderos	Defensive back	Chico State	
22	261	Pete Vann	Quarterback	Army	
23	274	Tom Gunnari	End	Washington State	
24	285	Bob Heaston	Guard	Cal Poly	
25	298	Dewey Wade	End	Kansas State	
26	309	Johnny Kerr	End	Purdue	
27	322	Dick Shockey	Back	Marquette	
28	333	Don Sanders	Back	Stanford	
29	346	Otto Kneidinger	Tackle	Penn State	
30	356	Bob Gongola	Back	Illinois	
Made roster * Made at least one Pro Bowl during career

== Personnel ==
=== Staff / Coaches ===
1955 San Francisco 49ers staff
Front office: Team Owner - Tony Morabito; General manager – Louis Spadia; Head coaches: Head coach - Frankie Albert; Offensive coaches: Chief of Offense / Offensive Coordinator - Red Hickey	Defensive coaches: Defensive Assistant – Phil Bengtson; Special teams coaches: None - N/A

=== Roster ===
1955 San Francisco 49ers roster
Quarterbacks: 12 Maury Duncan; 14 Y. A. Tittle; Running backs: 32 Lem Harkey; 36 Bud Laughlin; 39 Hugh McElhenny; Receivers: 88 Harry Babcock; 27 Carroll Hardy RB; 82 Gordy Soltau K; 84 Billy Wilson	Offensive linemen: 54 Ed Beatty C; 69 Bob Hantla G/LB/MG/DE; 64 Doug Hogland G/T; 53 Bill Johnson C; 65 Eldred Kraemer G; 73 Leo Nomellini T; 68 Lou Palatella G/MG; 63 Ed Sharkey G; 79 Bob St. Clair T; Defensive linemen: 76 Marion Campbell DT; 75 Al Carapella MG; 83 Clay Matthews DE; 87 Charley Powell DE; 86 Tom Stolhandske DE/LB; 74 Bob Toneff DT; 77 Sid Youngelman DT	Linebackers: 33 Hardy Brown; 57 Paul Carr CB; 55 Matt Hazeltine; Defensive backs: 22 Joe Arenas CB/RB; 23 Rex Berry S; 49 Bobby Luna CB/S/P; 47 Dicky Moegle S/RB; 42 Ernie Smith CB	Reserve lists: -- Ted Connolly G/T (Military); 85 Bill Jessup WR (IR); 35 John Henry Johnson RB (IR); 40 George Maderos CB (IR); 34 Joe Perry RB (IR); -- Floyd Sagely CB/WR (Military); -- Jerry Smith G (Military); rookies in italics

== Preseason ==
Week	Date	Opponent	Result	Record	Venue
1	August 7	Washington Redskins	W 7–6	1–0	Kezar Stadium
2	August 13	vs. Pittsburgh Steelers	W 60–14	2–0	Charles C. Hughes Stadium
3	August 20	vs. New York Giants	L 17–28	2–1	Husky Stadium
4	August 28	Cleveland Browns	W 17–14	3–1	Kezar Stadium
5	September 4	Chicago Cardinals	W 43–7	4–1	Kezar Stadium
6	September 9	at Los Angeles Rams	W 31–10	5–1	Los Angeles Memorial Coliseum

== Schedule ==
Week	Date	Opponent	Result	Record	Venue	Attendance	Recap
1	September 25	**Los Angeles Rams**	**L** 14–23	0–1	Kezar Stadium	58,772	Recap
2	October 2	Cleveland Browns	**L** 3–38	0–2	Kezar Stadium	43,595	Recap
3	October 9	at **Chicago Bears**	**W** 20–19	1–2	Wrigley Field	41,651	Recap
4	October 16	at **Detroit Lions**	**W** 27–24	2–2	Briggs Stadium	50,179	Recap
5	October 23	**Chicago Bears**	**L** 23–34	2–3	Kezar Stadium	56,350	Recap
6	October 30	**Detroit Lions**	**W** 38–21	3–3	Kezar Stadium	44,831	Recap
7	November 6	at **Los Angeles Rams**	**L** 14–27	3–4	Los Angeles Memorial Coliseum	71,832	Recap
8	November 13	at Washington Redskins	**L** 0–7	3–5	Griffith Stadium	25,112	Recap
9	November 20	at **Green Bay Packers**	**L** 21–27	3–6	Milwaukee County Stadium	19,099	Recap
10	November 27	at **Baltimore Colts**	**L** 14–26	3–7	Memorial Stadium	33,485	Recap
11	December 4	**Green Bay Packers**	**L** 7–28	3–8	Kezar Stadium	32,897	Recap
12	December 11	**Baltimore Colts**	**W** 35–24	4–8	Kezar Stadium	33,471	Recap
Note: Intra-conference opponents are in **bold** text.

=== Standings ===
NFL Western Conference
	W	L	T	PCT	CONF	PF	PA	STK
Los Angeles Rams	8	3	1	.727	6–3–1	260	231	W3
Chicago Bears	8	4	0	.667	7–3	294	251	W2
Green Bay Packers	6	6	0	.500	5–5	258	276	L1
Baltimore Colts	5	6	1	.455	5–4–1	214	239	L2
San Francisco 49ers	4	8	0	.333	4–6	216	298	W1
Detroit Lions	3	9	0	.250	2–8	230	275	L2

Note: Tie games were not officially counted in the standings until 1972.
