= Edward Kelley (American football) =

American football player (1933–2014)

No. 44
- Position: Defensive back

Personal information
- Born: June 8, 1933; Gonzales, Texas, U.S.
- Died: July 2, 2014 (aged 81); Galveston, Texas, U.S.
- Listed height: 6 ft 2 in (1.88 m)
- Listed weight: 195 lb (88 kg)

Career information
- High school: Cuero (Cuero, Texas)
- College: Texas (1951–1955)
- NFL draft: 1955: 5th round, 55th overall pick

Career history
- Dallas Texans (1961-1962)

Awards and highlights
- AFL champion (1962)

Career AFL statistics
- Games played: 14
- Stats at Pro Football Reference

Edward Clemens Kelley Jr. (June 8, 1933 – July 2, 2014) was an American professional football defensive back in the American Football League (AFL). He played in 1961 and 1962 for the Dallas Texans.
