= Hal Reeve =

Canadian football player (born c. 1933)

Profile
- Position: End

Personal information
- Born: c. 1933 (age 92–93)
- Listed height: 6 ft 2 in (1.88 m)
- Listed weight: 220 lb (100 kg)

Career information
- College: Oregon
- NFL draft: 1955: 7th round, 78th overall pick

Career history
- 1955: Calgary Stampeders

Hal Reeve (born c. 1933) is a former Canadian football player who played for the Calgary Stampeders. He played college football at the University of Oregon.
