= Ron Drzewiecki =

American football player (1933–2015)

No. 21, 22
- Positions: Halfback, defensive back

Personal information
- Born: January 25, 1933; Milwaukee, Wisconsin, U.S.
- Died: November 4, 2015 (aged 82); Milwaukee, Wisconsin, U.S.
- Listed height: 5 ft 11 in (1.80 m)
- Listed weight: 185 lb (84 kg)

Career information
- High school: Boys' Tech (WI)
- College: Marquette
- NFL draft: 1955: 1st round, 11th overall pick

Career history
- Chicago Bears (1955, 1957)

Career NFL statistics
- Rushing yards: 65
- Rushing average: 4.3
- Receptions: 2
- Receiving yards: 8
- Total touchdowns: 1
- Stats at Pro Football Reference

Ronald John Drzewiecki (January 25, 1933 – November 4, 2015) was a professional football player, a halfback and defensive back in the National Football League (NFL) for the Chicago Bears in 1955 and 1957. He was selected by Chicago in the first round of the 1955 NFL draft with the eleventh overall pick. He spent the 1956 season in the U.S. Navy and was cut from the Bears' training camp in mid-August 1958.

Drzewiecki was offered more money in 1955 to play in Canada for the Calgary Stampeders, but opted to play in the NFL with the Bears. He signed a contract with the Oakland Raiders in the spring of 1960, months prior to the first season of the American Football League.

Born and raised in Milwaukee, Wisconsin, Drzewiecki graduated from Boys' Tech High School in 1951, and played college football at Marquette University, also in Milwaukee, and was inducted into its athletic hall of fame in 1985. He died on November 4, 2015, at the age of 82.

== Personal life ==
Drzewiecki was of Polish descent.

== See also ==
- List of Chicago Bears players
- Marquette Golden Avalanche football
