= Walt Houston =

American football player (born 1932)

No. 65
- Position: Guard

Personal information
- Born: October 26, 1932); Wolf Lake, Illinois, U.S.
- Died: January 24, 2024 (aged 91); Ohio, U.S.
- Listed height: 6 ft 0 in (1.83 m)
- Listed weight: 217 lb (98 kg)

Career information
- High school: Washington (Massillon, Ohio)
- College: Miami (FL) (1950–1951); Purdue (1953–1954)
- NFL draft: 1955: 26th round, 303rd overall pick

Career history
- Washington Redskins (1955)

Career NFL statistics
- Games played: 10
- Games started: 10
- Stats at Pro Football Reference

Loren Walter Houston (October 26, 1932-January 24, 2024) is an American former professional football player who was a guard for the Washington Redskins of the National Football League (NFL). He graduated from Massillon Washington High School after twice being on Ohio-state championship teams. His senior-year team in 1950, quarterbacked by classmate Don James, was rated the No. 1 high school team in the United States. Houston went on to play college football for the Miami Hurricanes and Purdue Boilermakers. He was selected 303rd overall in the 26th round of the 1955 NFL draft.
