= Walt Jenkins =

American football player (1930–2021)

No. 89, 72
- Position: Defensive lineman

Personal information
- Born: December 9, 1930; Detroit, Michigan, U.S.
- Died: April 28, 2021 (aged 90); Detroit, Michigan, U.S.
- Listed height: 6 ft 2 in (1.88 m)
- Listed weight: 223 lb (101 kg)

Career information
- High school: Sidney D. Miller (Detroit)
- College: Wayne (1951–1954)
- NFL draft: 1955: 9th round, 108th overall pick

Career history
- Detroit Lions (1955); Hamilton Tiger-Cats (1956)
- Stats at Pro Football Reference

Dr. Walter B. Jenkins (December 9, 1930 – April 28, 2021) was an American professional football defensive lineman who played one season with the Detroit Lions of the National Football League (NFL). He played college football at Wayne University and was selected by the Lions in the ninth round of the 1955 NFL draft. He was also a member of the Hamilton Tiger-Cats of the Interprovincial Rugby Football Union.

== Early life ==
Walter B. Jenkins was born on December 9, 1930, in Detroit, Michigan. He attended Sidney D. Miller High School in Detroit. He earned All-City honors in football and track in high school. Jenkins set the Detroit city high school record in the shot put with a throw of 53'9".

== College career ==
Jenkins played college football for the Wayne Tartars of Wayne University from 1949 to 1950 and from 1953 to 1954. He was on the freshman team in 1949, and was a letterman in 1950, 1953, and 1954. His career was interrupted by a stint in the United States Army during the 1951 and 1952 seasons. Jenkins was a two-way player for the Tartars, spending time at offensive tackle, defensive tackle, offensive end, defensive end, and linebacker. He was also on the freshman track team during the 1950 season. He was inducted into the Wayne State University Athletic Hall of Fame in 1987.

== Professional career ==
Jenkins was selected by the Detroit Lions in the ninth round, with the 108th overall pick, of the 1955 NFL draft. He played in two games for the Lions during the 1955 season before being released on October 3, 1955.

Jenkins played in six games for the Hamilton Tiger-Cats of the Interprovincial Rugby Football Union in 1956.

== Personal life ==
Jenkins earned a Bachelor of Science and a Ph.D from Wayne State, and a Master of Arts from Eastern Michigan University.

Jenkins worked as an educator in the Detroit Public Schools system after his football career. He was the principal of Cooley High School and Detroit Northern High School. He was also the boys basketball coach at Kettering High School.

He died on April 28, 2021, in Detroit at the age of 90.
