= Frank Vincent (American football) =

American football player and coach (1932–2010)

Biographical details
- Born: October 12, 1932
- Died: November 26, 2010 (aged 78); Stafford, Virginia, U.S.

Playing career
- 1954: Glenville State
- Position: Center

Coaching career (HC unless noted)
- 1962–1979: Charleston HS (WV)
- 1980–1986: Glenville State

Accomplishments and honors

Championships
- 3 West Virginia Class AAA (1968–1970)

Frank A. Vincent (October 12, 1932 – November 26, 2010) was an American football player and coach. He was selected in the 16th round by the Pittsburgh Steelers in the 1955 NFL draft. Vincent served as the head football coach at Glenville State College in Glenville, West Virginia from 1980 to 1986. Prior to that, Vincent was a high school football coach at Charleston High School in West Virginia, where he captured three straight Class AAA state championships.
