= Gordy Holz =

American football player (1933–2015)

No. 73, 74, 72, 77
- Positions: Defensive tackle, offensive tackle

Personal information
- Born: May 24, 1933; St. Paul, Minnesota, U.S.
- Died: August 15, 2015 (aged 82); St. Louis Park, Minnesota, U.S.
- Listed height: 6 ft 4 in (1.93 m)
- Listed weight: 260 lb (118 kg)

Career information
- High school: Rosemount (Rosemount, Minnesota)
- College: Minnesota
- NFL draft: 1955: 23rd round, 270th overall pick

Career history
- Winnipeg Blue Bombers (1958)*; Boston Patriots (1960)*; Denver Broncos (1960-1963); New York Jets (1964); Philadelphia Bulldogs (1965)
- * Offseason or practice squad member only

Career AFL statistics
- Sacks: 7
- Interceptions: 1
- Stats at Pro Football Reference

Gordon Francis Holz (May 24, 1933 – August 15, 2015) was an American professional football defensive tackle and offensive tackle in the American Football League (AFL). He played five seasons for the AFL's Denver Broncos and New York Jets.

== See also ==
- List of American Football League players
