= Lamar Leachman =

American gridiron football player and coach (1932–2012)

No. 47
- Position: Center

Personal information
- Born: August 7, 1932; Cartersville, Georgia, U.S.
- Died: October 27, 2012 (aged 80); Myrtle Beach, South Carolina, U.S.
- Listed height: 6 ft 1 in (1.85 m)
- Listed weight: 220 lb (100 kg)

Career information
- High school: Cartersville (Cartersville, Georgia)
- College: Tennessee
- NFL draft: 1955: 30th round, 360th overall pick

Career history

Playing
- Calgary Stampeders (1956)

Coaching
- Richmond (1966–1967) Offensive line; Georgia Tech (1968–1971) Offensive line; Memphis (1972) Defensive line; South Carolina (1973) Defensive line; New York Stars / Charlotte Hornets (1974) Defensive line; Toronto Argonauts (1975–1977) Defensive line; Montreal Alouettes (1978–1979) Defensive coordinator; New York Giants (1980–1989) Defensive line; Detroit Lions (1990–1994) Defensive line

Awards and highlights
- Super Bowl champion (XXI)

Lamar Leachman (August 7, 1932 – October 27, 2012) was an American football coach. He served as an assistant coach for the Toronto Argonauts, Montreal Alouettes, New York Giants and Detroit Lions. His coaching career lasted a total of thirty-seven years across a variety of high school, college and professional teams; he began a tenure at Savannah High School in Georgia in 1957 and eventually retired in 1995.

He was the defensive line coach when the Giants won Super Bowl XXI. He was also the defensive line coach in 1991 when the Detroit Lions won a Divisional Round playoff game at the Pontiac Silverdome against Jimmy Johnson and the Dallas Cowboys, though they later lost to the Washington Commanders (then the Redskins) in the NFC Championship game.

Leachman's skills were held in high regard by his contemporaries in the NFL. During the Lions' 1991 win, commentator John Madden commented that Leachman "has found success wherever he's been." Lawrence Taylor, regarded as one of the best defensive players in football history, spoke highly of Leachman in his memoir Living on the Edge, as did Leonard Marshall in his own book, The End of the Line.

He died on October 27, 2012, in Myrtle Beach, South Carolina at age 80. His death from chronic traumatic encephalopathy (CTE) was chronicled in The King of Halloween and Miss Firecracker Queen: A Daughter's Tale of Family and Football, a 2018 memoir about growing up in the South with a football coach father authored by Duke University economics professor Lori Leachman.
