= Gene Mitcham =

American football player (1932–2008)

No. 80
- Position: End

Personal information
- Born: May 18, 1932; Phoenix, Arizona, U.S.
- Died: October 27, 2008 (aged 76); Phoenix, Arizona, U.S.
- Listed height: 6 ft 2 in (1.88 m)
- Listed weight: 206 lb (93 kg)

Career information
- High school: North (Phoenix)
- College: Arizona State (1951–1952, 1955–1956)
- NFL draft: 1955: 17th round, 199th overall pick

Career history
- Los Angeles Rams (1957); San Francisco 49ers (1958)*; Philadelphia Eagles (1958)
- * Offseason or practice squad member only

Career NFL statistics
- Receptions: 3
- Receiving yards: 39
- Touchdowns: 1
- Stats at Pro Football Reference

Gene Mitcham (May 18, 1932 – October 27, 2008) was an American professional football end. He was drafted by the Los Angeles Rams in the 17th round (199th overall) of the 1955 NFL Draft. He played for the Philadelphia Eagles in 1958.

He died on October 27, 2008, in Phoenix, Arizona at age 76.
