= Buddy Leake =

American gridiron football player (1933–2014)

No. 22
- Positions: Running back, Quarterback, Kicker

Personal information
- Born: May 25, 1933; Memphis, Tennessee, U.S.
- Died: February 18, 2014 (aged 80); Oklahoma City, Oklahoma, U.S.

Career information
- College: Oklahoma
- NFL draft: 1955: 3rd round, 29th overall pick

Career history
- 1955–1957: Winnipeg Blue Bombers

Awards and highlights
- Dave Dryburgh Memorial Trophy (1956); First-team All-Big Seven (1954); Second-team All-Big Seven (1951)

John E. "Buddy" Leake, Jr. (May 25, 1933 – February 18, 2014) was an American quarterback and kicker with the Winnipeg Blue Bombers in the Canadian Football League (CFL).

Leake was a star player with the Oklahoma Sooners. He played in Canada with the Blue Bombers for 3 seasons, his best being 1956, when he scored 103 points (10 touchdowns, 30 converts, 4 field goals, 1 single) and won the Dave Dryburgh Memorial Trophy.

After leaving football, Leake raised his 8 children with his wife, Carolyn in Memphis, Tennessee before eventually moving to Oklahoma City, Oklahoma in 1979. On February 18, 2014, Leake died at the age of 80 in Oklahoma City.
