= Dick Chorovich =

American football player (1932–1997)

No. 78, 71
- Positions: Defensive tackle, offensive tackle

Personal information
- Born: November 28, 1932; St. Clairsville, Ohio, U.S.
- Died: July 15, 1997 (aged 64)
- Listed height: 6 ft 4 in (1.93 m)
- Listed weight: 260 lb (118 kg)

Career information
- High school: St. Clairsville
- College: Miami (OH) (1951–1954)
- NFL draft: 1955: 12th round, 136th overall pick

Career history
- Baltimore Colts (1955–1956); Los Angeles Chargers (1960)

Career NFL/AFL statistics
- Fumble recoveries: 1
- Sacks: 4
- Stats at Pro Football Reference

Dick Chorovich (November 28, 1932 – July 15, 1997) was an American football defensive tackle. The Journal Herald called him "the biggest football player in the history of Miami university." He played for the Baltimore Colts from 1955 to 1956 and for the Los Angeles Chargers in 1960.

In his autobiography, NFL Hall of Famer Art Donovan had the following extremely high praise for Chorovich, his teammate with the Colts: "We had an offensive lineman named Dick Chorovich, who came along in 1955, and I swear, this guy could have been the greatest lineman to ever play the game. Chorovich had it all—size, speed, and a mean streak a mile wide. We used to joke that the Colts were hiding the fact that they had drafted him out of Joliet State Prison. With our defensive line, any rookie offensive lineman who came along was guaranteed to take a beating. But this kid Chorovich was pushing guys like me and Gino [Marchetti] around like we were goddamn high-school kids. Anyway, Chorovich was from Miami of Ohio, and that's where Weeb [Ewbank] had begun his coaching career. And Weeb hated this kid because he was a real wise guy. Plus, I think Weeb just wanted to be the biggest name to come out of Miami of Ohio. He ran Dick Chorovich ragged, and after two seasons, he ran him right out of the league. He took the worst beating of any rookie lineman ever to come to a Colt camp."

Nonetheless, Chorovich did make a comeback in 1960, playing all 14 games and starting 12 for the Los Angeles Chargers, en route to their first-place finish in the AFL West. He was even named the AFL's Defensive Player of the Week after the Chargers' Week-6 victory over the Broncos. After that game, Denver quarterback Frank Tripucka told reporters, "That Chorovich was the toughest lineman I've operated against this season."
