= Walter Bryan =

American football player (1933–2020)

No. 21
- Positions: Defensive back, halfback

Personal information
- Born: December 23, 1933; Olney, Texas, U.S.
- Died: March 6, 2020 (aged 86); Abilene, Texas, U.S.
- Listed height: 6 ft 1 in (1.85 m)
- Listed weight: 185 lb (84 kg)

Career information
- High school: Olney
- College: Tarleton State (1951-1952); Texas Tech (1953-1954)
- NFL draft: 1955: 9th round, 99th overall pick

Career history
- Baltimore Colts (1955)

Career NFL statistics
- Rushing yards: 4
- Rushing average: 2
- Interceptions: 1
- Stats at Pro Football Reference

Walter Dean Bryan (December 23, 1933 – March 6, 2020) was an American professional football player who played for the Baltimore Colts of the National Football League (NFL). He played college football at Tarleton State University and Texas Tech University.

He died on March 6, 2020, in Abilene, Texas at the age of 86.
