= Dewey Wade =

American football player and coach (1931–2012)

Personal information
- Born: August 12, 1931
- Died: July 9, 2012 (aged 80)

Career information
- College: Kansas State (1951–1952); Houston (1957–1958)
- NFL draft: 1955: 25th round, 298th overall pick

Dewey Wade (born August 12, 1931) was an NCAA football player and coach, and a player for the National Football League (NFL)'s San Francisco 49ers born in St. Joseph, Missouri.

== Biography ==
Wade went to school at Omaha North High School, where he was on the state football champion team in 1948, and the city champion football teams of 1949 and 1950. In 1950, he won the honors of joining the All-City and All-State teams, as well as lettering in football, wrestling, basketball and track.

Later that year Wade began college at Kansas State University, where he played for the Wildcats. He scored first Big Seven touchdown versus the University of Missouri in 1950 and led the team in rushing yardage versus Kansas as well. He also rushed for 79 yards and six first downs versus Nebraska. Wade left college to play football for the United States Marine Corps football team. He was named to the "second-team" for the 1954 All-Service Team.

In 1955, Wade was drafted in the 25th round by the San Francisco 49ers. He played for the Houston Cougars in 1957 and 1958, and graduated from University of Houston in 1959.

=== Coaching ===
Wade became a coach with Dick Offenheimer for the University at Buffalo in 1960 and stayed there through 1965. In 1966, he went to the University of Maryland with head coach Lou Saban, and, in 1969, he began coaching at Utah State University with Chuck Mills, staying there through 1971.

In February 1972, Wade began coaching with Vince Gibson at his alma mater of Kansas State University. He had stints coaching professionally with the Omaha Mustangs (1967 Professional Football League of America, 1968 Continental Football League) and the Edmonton Eskimos of the Canadian Football League in 1970.

Wade was a National Football League scout for several teams, including the Baltimore Colts, Pittsburgh Steelers, and Dallas Cowboys.

=== Playing History, Accolades ===
==== High school ====
Omaha North High School Vikings

- 1950 Omaha City Champions
- 1949 Omaha City Champions
- 1948 Omaha City and Nebraska State Champions
- 1950 All City Omaha, All State Football, Individual Honors

=== NCAA Coaching Experience ===
- University at Buffalo 1960, 1961, 1962, 1963, 1964, 1965
  - Notable players; Gerry Philbin, John Stofa, John Cimba, Jim McNally, Mike Mazer, Gerry LaFountain, Jim Ratel, Don Gilbert
- University of Maryland 1966
  - Notable players:
- Utah State University 1969, 1970, 1971
  - Notable players: Tony Adams, Bill Dunstan, Tom Forzani, Kent Baer
- Kansas State University 1972

== Sources ==
- Kansas State University Media Guide 1951, 1952, 1953
- Utah State University Media Guide 1970, 1971
- San Francisco Chronicle, Sporting Green, August 19, 1956
- San Francisco 49ers Game program; SF-Cleveland Browns 1956
- American Football Coaches Association: All Time Hula Bowl Roster, 1955, 1956
- NFL Draft Data Base SF 49ers
- K-State Wildcat Football, Wildcats in the NFL
- San Francisco 49ers DraftHistory.com
- University of Houston Lettermen Association
- Hall Of Fame: DEWEY WADE
