= Jim Temp =

American football player (1933–2012)

No. 82
- Position: Defensive end

Personal information
- Born: October 10, 1933; La Crosse, Wisconsin, U.S.
- Died: November 25, 2012 (aged 79); Allouez, Wisconsin, U.S.
- Listed height: 6 ft 4 in (1.93 m)
- Listed weight: 245 lb (111 kg)

Career information
- High school: Aquinas (WI)
- College: Wisconsin
- NFL draft: 1955: 2nd round, 17th overall pick

Career history
- Green Bay Packers (1957–1960)

Awards and highlights
- Second-team All-Big Ten (1954); UW Athletic Hall of Fame (2007)

Career NFL statistics
- Games played: 43
- Interceptions: 1
- Fumble recoveries: 2
- Stats at Pro Football Reference

James Arthur Temp (October 10, 1933 – November 25, 2012) was an American professional football player, businessman, and philanthropist.

Born in La Crosse, Wisconsin, Temp attended Aquinas High School in La Crosse. Temp then attended the University of Wisconsin–Madison, playing baseball and football. He was named the school's top athlete in his senior year (1955) and eventually inducted into the UW Athletic Hall of Fame (2007).

Temp was selected 17th in the second round of the 1955 NFL draft by the Green Bay Packers. He served two years in the U.S. Army before joining the team in 1957 as a defensive end. He played 43 games with them over four seasons (1957–1960; the last two under Vince Lombardi) before being forced into retirement by a shoulder injury.

Temp joined the Green Bay Packers Board of Directors in 1987 and served as a member emeritus of the executive committee (1993–2004).

Temp was head of the UW-Green Bay Founders Association, whose purpose was development of a philanthropic base for University of Wisconsin–Green Bay (UWGB). He served as association president in 1980 and 1981. In 1984, he joined Donald J. Long Sr., to take on yet another challenge on behalf of UWGB, chairing the university's first capital campaign (raising more than $2.5 million). In gratitude, the school named the James A. Temp Hall (a student dormitory) after him in 1989.

In addition to his professional work as president of Alexander and Alexander of Wisconsin, an insurance brokerage), Temp served in many community leadership roles with business organizations, civic groups, and health agencies. He continued to work on behalf of UWGB as a director of the Founders Association and University Village Housing Inc. He had a wife, Carol Jean Temp, with whom he had four daughters.

Temp battled heart disease in his later years. On November 25, 2012, while watching football, he became ill and died later that day. He was 79 years old.
