= Doyle Nix =

American football player (1933–2009)

No. 41, 20, 29, 25
- Position: Defensive back

Personal information
- Born: May 30, 1933; Texarkana, Texas, U.S.
- Died: January 6, 2009 (aged 75)
- Listed height: 6 ft 1 in (1.85 m)
- Listed weight: 191 lb (87 kg)

Career information
- High school: Texas (Texarkana)
- College: SMU
- NFL draft: 1955: 18th round, 209th overall pick

Career history
- Green Bay Packers (1955); Washington Redskins (1958–1959); Dallas Cowboys (1960)*; Los Angeles Chargers (1960); Houston Oilers (1961)*; Dallas Texans (1961)
- * Offseason or practice squad member only

Career NFL/AFL statistics
- Interceptions: 16
- Fumble recoveries: 3
- Total touchdowns: 1
- Stats at Pro Football Reference

Doyle Edward Nix (May 30, 1933 – January 6, 2009) was an American football defensive back in the National Football League (NFL) for the Green Bay Packers and Washington Redskins. He also was a member of the Los Angeles Chargers and Dallas Texans in the American Football League (AFL). He played college football at Southern Methodist University.

== Early life ==
Nix attended Texas High School. He accepted a football scholarship from Southern Methodist University. He was a two-year starter and one of the offensive leaders of the team.

As a junior, he was second on the team with 12 receptions for 187 yards (15.6-yard avg.). He was a teammate of future Pro Football Hall of Famers Raymond Berry and Forrest Gregg.

== Professional career ==
=== Green Bay Packers ===
Nix was selected by the Green Bay Packers in the 18th round (209th overall) of the 1955 NFL draft. He had a successful rookie season at cornerback, while registering 5 interceptions. He spent the next two years out of football while serving his military service with the United States Air Force.

On March 4, 1958, he was traded along with cornerback John Petitbon to the Washington Redskins in exchange for wide receiver Steve Meilinger and defensive tackle J. D. Kimmel.

=== Washington Redskins ===
In 1958, he played in 11 games after missing time with a broken hand. The next year, he played in only 8 games, missing time as a designated healthy scratch.

=== Dallas Cowboys ===
Nix was selected by the Dallas Cowboys in the 1960 NFL expansion draft, but did not make the regular season roster.

=== Los Angeles Chargers (AFL) ===
On September 22, 1960, he was signed as a free agent by the Los Angeles Chargers of the American Football League. He was a part of the franchise's inaugural season and posted 4 interceptions, while helping the team reach the 1960 American Football League Championship Game.

On August 22, 1961, he was traded to the Houston Oilers along with linebacker Ron Botchan in exchange for two draft choices.

=== Dallas Texans (AFL) ===
In 1961, he played with the Dallas Texans of the American Football League and registered 3 interceptions.
