= Dave Finney =

American politician (1933–2022)

David Ray Finney (September 29, 1933 – January 18, 2022) was an American lawyer, Texas State Legislator, and politician.

Finney was born and raised in Northside in Fort Worth, Texas, where he graduated from Northside High School. Finney then graduated with his bachelor's degree from Texas Christian University in 1955 and graduated from University of Texas with his law degree in 1958. Finney was admitted to the Texas bar. Finney served in the United States Air Force from 1958 to 1961. In 1970, Finney received his master's degree in business administration from University of Chicago. Finney served in the Texas House of Representatives from 1963 until 1977 and was a Democrat. He died in Fort Worth, Texas.
