= Jim Jennings (American football) =

American football player (1933–2007)

No. 85
- Position: Defensive end

Personal information
- Born: November 14, 1933; Crystal City, Missouri, U.S.
- Died: October 29, 2007 (aged 73); Springfield, Missouri, U.S.
- Listed height: 6 ft 3 in (1.91 m)
- Listed weight: 195 lb (88 kg)

Career information
- High school: Crystal City
- College: Missouri (1951–1954)
- NFL draft: 1955: 26th round, 305th overall pick

Career history
- Green Bay Packers (1955)

Awards and highlights
- Second-team All-Big Seven (1952)

Career NFL statistics
- Fumble recoveries: 1
- Stats at Pro Football Reference

James Benton Jennings (November 14, 1933 – October 29, 2007) was a player in the National Football League (NFL).

== Career ==
Jennings was drafted 305th overall by the Green Bay Packers in the 26th round of the 1955 NFL draft and played that season with the team. He played at the collegiate level for the University of Missouri Tigers.
