= Lou Palatella =

American football player (born 1933)

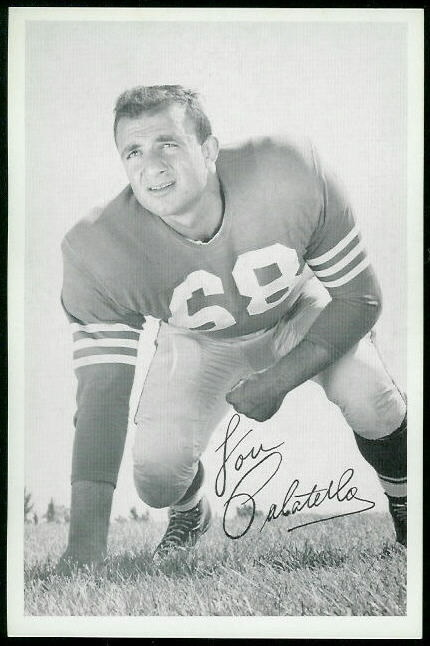

No. 68
- Positions: Guard, linebacker

Personal information
- Born: July 28, 1933 (age 93); Vandergrift, Pennsylvania, U.S.
- Listed height: 6 ft 2 in (1.88 m)
- Listed weight: 230 lb (104 kg)

Career information
- High school: Vandergrift
- College: Pittsburgh
- NFL draft: 1955: 12th round, 141st overall pick

Career history
- San Francisco 49ers (1955–1958)

Awards and highlights
- Second-team All-Eastern (1954)

Career NFL statistics
- Games played: 43
- Games started: 24
- Fumble recoveries: 2
- Stats at Pro Football Reference

Louis Marino Palatella (born July 28, 1933) is an American former professional football player who was a guard for the San Francisco 49ers of the National Football League (NFL). He played college football for the Pittsburgh Panthers.

== Early life ==
Palatella was born on July 28, 1933, in Vandergrift, Pennsylvania. He attended Vandergrift High School, where he excelled in football.

== College career ==
Palatella attended the University of Pittsburgh, where he played college football for the Panthers.

== Professional career ==
Palatella played as a guard and a linebacker with the San Francisco 49ers for four seasons.

== Post-playing career ==
After retiring from football, Palatella became a liquor distributor in Southern California. He owns a tequila company and a bourbon distillery in Bardstown, Kentucky, which his wife Marci and he opened in 2018.

== Personal life ==
Lou Palatella is married to his second wife, Marci Palatella. Together they have two sons. Marci Palatella was charged in connection to 2019 college admissions bribery scandal and is facing mail fraud charges for allegedly paying $575,000 to a nonprofit that allegedly assisted in her son's SAT test and conspiring to bribe a University of Southern California athletic director to designate her son as a football recruit. Following her arrest, Marci pled not guilty and was released on a $1,000,000 unsecured bond. She would appear in court.

On August 24, 2021, Marci reversed course and agreed to plead guilty. The next day, she officially pled guilty to conspiracy to commit honest services mail fraud.

On December 16, 2021, Marci was sentenced to six weeks in prison, a $250,000 fine, two years of supervised release, with a condition of home confinement for the first six months of supervised release, and 500 hours of community service, as previously recommended by both the prosecution and defense.
