= Dean Renfro =

American football player (1932–2012)

No. 20, 99
- Position: Halfback

Personal information
- Born: June 15, 1932; Whitesboro, Texas, U.S.
- Died: November 11, 2012 (aged 80); Plano, Texas, U.S.
- Listed height: 5 ft 11 in (1.80 m)
- Listed weight: 180 lb (82 kg)

Career information
- High school: Leonard (TX)
- College: North Texas
- NFL draft: 1955: 2nd round, 25th overall pick

Career history
- Cleveland Browns (1955)*; Baltimore Colts (1955); Calgary Stampeders (1956–1957)
- * Offseason or practice squad member only

Career NFL statistics
- Rushing yards: 13
- Rushing average: 3.3
- Return yards: 20
- Stats at Pro Football Reference

Dean Renfro (June 15, 1932 – November 11, 2012) was an American professional football halfback. He was drafted by the Cleveland Browns in the second round (25th overall) of the 1955 NFL Draft. He played for the Baltimore Colts in 1955 and for the Calgary Stampeders from 1956 to 1957.

He died on November 11, 2012, in Plano, Texas at age 80.
