= Bob Clemens (American football) =

American football player (born 1933)

No. 33
- Position: Fullback

Personal information
- Born: August 3, 1933 (age 93); Scottsboro, Alabama, U.S.
- Listed height: 6 ft 2 in (1.88 m)
- Listed weight: 200 lb (91 kg)

Career information
- High school: Scottsboro
- College: Georgia
- NFL draft: 1955: 7th round, 77th overall pick

Career history
- Green Bay Packers (1955)
- Stats at Pro Football Reference

Robert Norwood Clemens (born August 3, 1933) is a former fullback in the National Football League (NFL).

== Career ==
Clemens was drafted 77th overall in the seventh round of the 1955 NFL draft by the Green Bay Packers and played that season with the team. He played at the collegiate level at the University of Georgia.
