= Dick Deschaine =

American football player (1932–2018)

Profile
- Position: Punter

Personal information
- Born: April 28, 1932; Menominee, Michigan, U.S.
- Died: May 20, 2018 (aged 86)

Career information
- High school: Menominee High School (Michigan)

Career history
- Green Bay Packers (1955–1957); Cleveland Browns (1958)

Career statistics
- Punts: 231
- Punting yards: 9,777
- Punting average: 42.3
- Longest punt: 73
- Stats at Pro Football Reference

Dick Deschaine (April 28, 1932 – May 20, 2018) was a former punter in the National Football League.

Deschaine was born on April 28, 1932, in Menominee, Michigan. He played with the Green Bay Packers for three seasons. During his final season in the NFL, he played with the Cleveland Browns. His career punting average was 42.3 yards.

Deschaine was one of the few NFL players to have never played college football. He died on May 20, 2018.
