= 1955 Los Angeles Rams season =

NFL team season

- Owner: Dan Reeves
- Head coach: Sid Gillman
- Home stadium: Los Angeles Memorial Coliseum

Results
- Record: 8–3–1
- Division place: 1st NFL Western
- Playoffs: Lost NFL Championship (vs. Browns) 14–38

Uniform
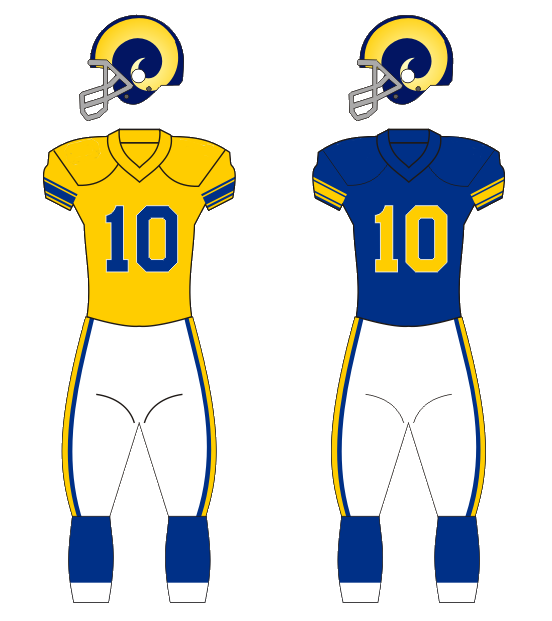

The 1955 Los Angeles Rams season was the team's 18th year with the National Football League and the tenth season in Los Angeles. The Rams won the Western Conference title and hosted the NFL championship game, but lost to the Cleveland Browns, 38–14.

The Rams did not reach another NFL title game until 24 years later, in Super Bowl XIV in January 1980.

== Schedule ==
Week	Date	Opponent	Result	Record	Venue	Attendance	Recap
1	September 25	at **San Francisco 49ers**	**W** 27–14	1–0	Kezar Stadium	60,100	Recap
2	October 2	Pittsburgh Steelers	**W** 27–26	2–0	Los Angeles Memorial Coliseum	45,816	Recap
3	October 8	at **Detroit Lions**	**W** 17–10	3–0	Briggs Stadium	54,836	Recap
4	October 16	at **Green Bay Packers**	**L** 28–30	3–1	Milwaukee County Stadium	26,960	Recap
5	October 23	**Detroit Lions**	**W** 24–13	4–1	Los Angeles Memorial Coliseum	68,690	Recap
6	October 30	**Chicago Bears**	**L** 20–31	4–2	Los Angeles Memorial Coliseum	69,587	Recap
7	November 6	**San Francisco 49ers**	**W** 27–14	5–2	Los Angeles Memorial Coliseum	85,302	Recap
8	November 13	at **Chicago Bears**	**L** 3–24	5–3	Wrigley Field	50,187	Recap
9	November 20	at **Baltimore Colts**	**T** 17–17	5–3–1	Memorial Stadium	41,186	Recap
10	November 27	at Philadelphia Eagles	**W** 23–21	6–3–1	Connie Mack Stadium	31,648	Recap
11	December 4	**Baltimore Colts**	**W** 20–14	7–3–1	Los Angeles Memorial Stadium	37,024	Recap
12	December 11	**Green Bay Packers**	**W** 31–17	8–3–1	Los Angeles Memorial Stadium	90,535	Recap
Note: Intra-conference opponents are in **bold** text.

== Playoffs ==
Week	Date	Opponent	Result	Record	Venue	Attendance
Championship	December 26	Cleveland Browns	L 14–38	0–1	Los Angeles Memorial Coliseum	87,695

=== Standings ===
NFL Western Conference
	W	L	T	PCT	CONF	PF	PA	STK
Los Angeles Rams	8	3	1	.727	6–3–1	260	231	W3
Chicago Bears	8	4	0	.667	7–3	294	251	W2
Green Bay Packers	6	6	0	.500	5–5	258	276	L1
Baltimore Colts	5	6	1	.455	5–4–1	214	239	L2
San Francisco 49ers	4	8	0	.333	4–6	216	298	W1
Detroit Lions	3	9	0	.250	2–8	230	275	L2

Note: Tie games were not officially counted in the standings until 1972.

== Final roster ==
1955 Los Angeles Rams roster
Quarterbacks (QB): 11 Norm Van Brocklin P; 9 Bill Wade; Running backs (RB): 21 Skeet Quinlan; 32 Dan Towler; 27 Ron Waller; 35 Tank Younger; Wide receivers (WR): 82 Bob Boyd; 80 Tom Fears K; 40 Elroy Hirsch; 20 Woodley Lewis; 23 Tom McCormick RB; Tight ends (TE)	Offensive linemen (OL): 73 Bobby Cross T; 63 John Hock G; 79 Glenn Holtzman T; 50 Leon McLaughlin C; 61 Duane Putnam G; 70 Charlie Toogood T; Defensive linemen (DL): 60 Jack Ellena MG; 68 Sid Fournet MG/DE; 71 Frank Fuller DE/DT/MG; 65 Art Hauser DT; 78 Gene Lipscomb DT; 62 Bud McFadin DT/K; 81 Paul Miller DE; 57 Don Paul MG/LB; 84 Andy Robustelli DE	Linebackers (LB): 58 Bob Griffin C; 56 Larry Morris FB; 67 Les Richter G/K; Defensive backs (DB): 25 Don Burroughs S; 41 Jim Cason CB; 49 Ed Hughes CB; 43 Will Sherman S; Special teams (ST)	Reserve: 86 Jack Bighead WR (IR); -- Rudy Bukich QB (Military); 88 Bob Carey WR (IR); -- Dick Daugherty G (Military); -- Bob Fry T (Military); 22 Hall Haynes CB (IR); -- Brad Myers RB (Military); 48 Corky Taylor CB/RB (IR); -- Duane Wardlow DE (Military); Rookies in italics
