= Corky Taylor =

American football player (1933–2022)

No. 48, 47
- Positions: Defensive back, running back

Personal information
- Born: October 31, 1933; Kansas City, Missouri, U.S.
- Died: May 20, 2022 (aged 88); Prescott Valley, Arizona, U.S.
- Listed height: 5 ft 10 in (1.78 m)
- Listed weight: 189 lb (86 kg)

Career information
- High school: Southeast (Kansas City)
- College: Kansas State (1951–1954)
- NFL draft: 1955: 2nd round, 19th overall pick

Career history
- Los Angeles Rams (1955, 1957)

Awards and highlights
- Second-team All-American (1954); First-team All-Big Seven (1954)

Career NFL statistics
- Rushing yards: 95
- Rushing average: 3.7
- Receptions: 7
- Receiving yards: 47
- Interceptions: 2
- Total touchdowns: 2
- Stats at Pro Football Reference

Cecil Reign Taylor Jr. (October 31, 1933 – May 20, 2022) was an American professional football player who played for the Los Angeles Rams of the National Football League (NFL). He played college football at Kansas State University. He missed the 1956 season because he was drafted into the Army.

In 1964, Taylor moved to Tucson, Arizona and worked for 27 years with the University of Arizona as an administrator.
