= 1955 Chicago Bears season =

NFL team season

- Owner: George Halas
- Head coach: George Halas
- Home stadium: Wrigley Field

Results
- Record: 8–4
- Division place: 2nd NFL Western
- Playoffs: Did not qualify

The 1955 season was the Chicago Bears' 36th in the National Football League. The team matched on their 8–4 record from 1954 under head coach George Halas, repeating as the runner-up in the NFL's Western Conference. Chicago opened the season with three losses, then won eight of nine.

During the season, owner Halas announced that he was stepping down as head coach, ending his third ten-year tenure as coach. Longtime assistant Paddy Driscoll, age 61, was promoted in early February, led the team for two seasons, then was reassigned when Halas returned as head coach in 1958.

== Regular season ==
=== Schedule ===
Week	Date	Opponent	Result	Record	Venue	Attendance	Recap
1	September 25	at **Baltimore Colts**	**L** 17–23	0–1	Memorial Stadium	36,167	Recap
2	October 2	at **Green Bay Packers**	**L** 24–3	0–2	Wrigley Field	48,890	Recap
3	October 9	**San Francisco 49ers**	**L** 19–20	0–3	Wrigley Field	41,651	Recap
4	October 16	**Baltimore Colts**	**W** 38–10	1–3	Wrigley Field	40,184	Recap
5	October 23	at **San Francisco 49ers**	**W** 34–23	2–3	Kezar Stadium	56,350	Recap
6	October 30	at **Los Angeles Rams**	**W** 31–20	3–3	L.A. Memorial Coliseum	69,587	Recap
7	November 6	**Green Bay Packers**	**W** 52–31	4–3	City Stadium	24,662	Recap
8	November 13	**Los Angeles Rams**	**W** 24–3	5–3	Wrigley Field	50,187	Recap
9	November 20	at **Detroit Lions**	**W** 24–14	6–3	Tiger Stadium	53,610	Recap
10	November 27	at Chicago Cardinals	**L** 14–53	6–4	Comiskey Park	47,314	Recap
11	December 4	**Detroit Lions**	**W** 21–20	7–4	Wrigley Field	39,388	Recap
12	December 11	Philadelphia Eagles	**W** 17–10	8–4	Wrigley Field	34,783	Recap
Note: Intra-conference opponents are in **bold** text.

=== Standings ===
Program from the October 16 game against the visiting Baltimore Colts.

NFL Western Conference
	W	L	T	PCT	CONF	PF	PA	STK
Los Angeles Rams	8	3	1	.727	6–3–1	260	231	W3
Chicago Bears	8	4	0	.667	7–3	294	251	W2
Green Bay Packers	6	6	0	.500	5–5	258	276	L1
Baltimore Colts	5	6	1	.455	5–4–1	214	239	L2
San Francisco 49ers	4	8	0	.333	4–6	216	298	W1
Detroit Lions	3	9	0	.250	2–8	230	275	L2

Note: Tie games were not officially counted in the standings until 1972.

== Roster ==
Chicago Bears 1955 roster
Quarterbacks: 16 George Blanda K; 15 Ed Brown P; 9 Bob Williams; Running backs: 35 Rick Casares; 21 Ron Drzewiecki; 89 John Hoffman; 30 Chick Jagade; 45 Bobby Watkins; Receivers: 87 Harlon Hill; 83 Bill McColl; 88 Gene Schroeder	Offensive linemen: 65 Herman Clark G/MG; 62 Kline Gilbert T; 69 Ralph Jecha G; 78 Stan Jones G; 55 Larry Strickland C; 72 Bill Wightkin T; Defensive linemen: 81 Doug Atkins DE; 73 Bill Bishop DT; 61 Bill George MG/G; 82 Jack Hoffman DE/WR; 58 John Kreamcheck DT; 7 Ed Sprinkle DE; 75 Fred Williams DT	Linebackers: 71 George Connor; 31 Joe Fortunato; 51 Wayne Hansen C; Defensive backs: 14 Ken Gorgal S; 80 John Helwig CB; 48 Harry Hugasian S; 6 Don Kindt CB/RB; 20 Ray Gene Smith CB/RB; 26 Charlie Sumner CB	Reserve list: -- Don Bingham RB (Military); 12 Zeke Bratkowski QB/P (Military); 43 Jim Dooley WR (Military); 29 McNeil Moore S (Military); 10 Tommy O'Connell QB (Military); 40 Stan Wallace S/CB (Military); Rookies in italics
