= Nate Borden =

American gridiron football player (1932–1992)

No. 87, 75
- Position: Defensive end

Personal information
- Born: September 22, 1932; Detroit, Michigan, U.S.
- Died: September 30, 1992 (aged 60); Las Vegas, Nevada, U.S.
- Listed height: 6 ft 0 in (1.83 m)
- Listed weight: 234 lb (106 kg)

Career information
- High school: William L. Dickinson (Jersey City, New Jersey)
- College: Indiana
- NFL draft: 1955: 25th round, 293rd overall pick

Career history
- Green Bay Packers (1955–1959); Dallas Cowboys (1960–1961); Buffalo Bills (1962); Toronto Argonauts (1963)*
- * Offseason or practice squad member only

Awards and highlights
- Second-team All-Big Ten (1954)

Career NFL/AFL statistics
- Fumble recoveries: 9
- Stats at Pro Football Reference

Nathaniel Borden (September 22, 1932 – September 30, 1992) was a professional American football defensive end in the National Football League (NFL) for the Green Bay Packers and Dallas Cowboys. He also was a member of the Buffalo Bills in the American Football League (AFL). He played college football at Indiana University.

== Early life ==
Borden attended William L. Dickinson High School, where he was an All-state fullback and tackle. He also practiced the discus throw, the shot put and the two-mile run.

He accepted a scholarship from Indiana University. As a freshman, he played at defensive tackle. He played as a defensive end in his next two years. As a senior, he was moved back to defensive tackle. He never missed a game, playing in 36 straight contests.

== Professional career ==
=== Green Bay Packers ===
Borden was selected by the Green Bay Packers in the 25th round (293rd overall) of the 1955 NFL draft.

During this early period, Borden was one of the few African-American players on the Packers along with Frank Purnell, who played in 1957. When he could not find housing within the city limits, he had to room at a rundown motel just outside Green Bay. A number of Packers were also staying at the motel. They told the manager he would lose their business if Borden could not room there. Quarterback Bart Starr befriended Borden and frequently had him and his family at Starr's home for dinner.

He was a starter at defensive end during four straight seasons. When Vince Lombardi was hired as the new head coach for the 1959 season, Borden was the only African-American player on the roster and Lombardi had to assist him in finding a decent place to live. He wasn't protected for the NFL Expansion Draft due to a knee injury.

=== Dallas Cowboys ===
Borden was selected by the Dallas Cowboys in the 1960 NFL expansion draft and became the first starter at left defensive end in franchise history, registering 48 tackles. The next year, he was switched to the right side, after John Gonzaga was traded and Bob Lilly was drafted. He was released on September 11, 1962.

=== Buffalo Bills ===
In 1962, he was signed by the Buffalo Bills of the American Football League. He played in three games before an ankle injury sidelined him for the rest of the season. He was cut in 1963.

=== Toronto Argonauts ===
On July 15, 1963, he signed with the Toronto Argonauts of the Canadian Football League. He was released on July 26.

== Personal life ==
In 1961, he was a college scout for the Dallas Cowboys during the offseason. In 1965, he was hired to scout for the United Scouting organization of the NFL, before being hired by the Green Bay Packers for the same role. In 1967, he was hired as a scout by the Atlanta Falcons. In 1973, he took a job as a part-time scout for the Cincinnati Bengals. In 1974, he was hired as a fulltime scout with the World Football League.

After finishing his scouting years, Borden became the assistant to the mayor of Jersey City, Jim Sutcliffe. After Sutcliffe lost a bid for re-election, Borden moved to Las Vegas, where he was assistant to the mayor Russ Dorn. He was also the Officer of Urban Development in the city of Las Vegas.

Borden died of cancer in Las Vegas on September 30, 1992. He left behind two sons and a daughter.
