= 1955 Detroit Lions season =

NFL team season

- Head coach: Buddy Parker
- Home stadium: Briggs Stadium

Results
- Record: 3–9
- Division place: 6th NFL Western
- Playoffs: Did not qualify

The 1955 Detroit Lions season was their 26th in the league. The team failed to improve on their previous season's output of 9–2–1, winning only three games. They missed the playoffs for the first time in four seasons.

== Schedule ==
According to the team, a total of 36,434 season tickets were sold by the Lions for the 1955 campaign. The Lions played their home games in Briggs Stadium (Tiger Stadium), which had a regular listed seating capacity of 46,194, with an additional 7,000 bleacher seats for football to bring total capacity to 53,194.

Week	Date	Opponent	Result	Record	Venue	Attendance	Recap
1	September 25	at **Green Bay Packers**	**L** 17–20	0–1	City Stadium	22,217	Recap
2	October 1	at **Baltimore Colts**	**L** 13–28	0–2	Memorial Stadium	40,030	Recap
3	October 9	**Los Angeles Rams**	**L** 10–17	0–3	Briggs Stadium	54,836	Recap
4	October 16	**San Francisco 49ers**	**L** 24–27	0–4	Briggs Stadium	51,438	Recap
5	October 23	at **Los Angeles Rams**	**L** 13–24	0–5	Los Angeles Memorial Coliseum	68,690	Recap
6	October 30	at **San Francisco 49ers**	**L** 21–38	0–6	Kezar Stadium	47,731	Recap
7	November 5	**Baltimore Colts**	**W** 24–14	1–6	Briggs Stadium	53,874	Recap
8	November 13	at Pittsburgh Steelers	**W** 31–28	2–6	Forbes Field	34,441	Recap
9	November 20	**Chicago Bears**	**L** 14–24	2–7	Briggs Stadium	53,610	Recap
10	November 24	**Green Bay Packers**	**W** 24–10	3–7	Briggs Stadium	51,685	Recap
11	December 4	at **Chicago Bears**	**L** 20–21	3–8	Wrigley Field	39,388	Recap
12	December 11	New York Giants	**L** 19–24	3–9	Briggs Stadium	45,929	Recap
Note: Intra-conference opponents are in **bold** text.

- Saturday night (October 1, November 5), Thursday (November 24: Thanksgiving)

== Standings ==
NFL Western Conference
	W	L	T	PCT	CONF	PF	PA	STK
Los Angeles Rams	8	3	1	.727	6–3–1	260	231	W3
Chicago Bears	8	4	0	.667	7–3	294	251	W2
Green Bay Packers	6	6	0	.500	5–5	258	276	L1
Baltimore Colts	5	6	1	.455	5–4–1	214	239	L2
San Francisco 49ers	4	8	0	.333	4–6	216	298	W1
Detroit Lions	3	9	0	.250	2–8	230	275	L2

Note: Tie games were not officially counted in the standings until 1972.

== Roster ==
1955 Detroit Lions roster
Quarterbacks (QB): 12 Harry Gilmer; 22 Bobby Layne; Running backs (RB): 34 Lew Carpenter; 23 Jug Girard P/WR; 82 Leon Hart DE; 37 Doak Walker K/S; Wide receivers (WR): 87 Dorne Dibble; 83 Jim Doran; 28 Dave Middleton RB; Tight ends (TE)	Offensive linemen (OL): 50 Charlie Ane C/T; 62 George Atkins G; 67 Stan Campbell G; 52 Andy Miketa C; 51 Jim Salsbury T/G/MG; 66 Harley Sewell G; 63 Dick Stanfel T/G; Defensive linemen (DL): 88 Jim Cain DE; 76 Lou Creekmur MG/T/G; 85 Sonny Gandee DE/LB; 86 Bob Long DE; 72 Gil Mains DT; 78 Darris McCord DT/T; 74 Bob Miller DT	Linebackers (LB): 62 Jim Martin K; 56 Joe Schmidt; 54 Ted Topor; Defensive backs (DB): 24 Jack Christiansen S; 25 Jim David CB; 48 Dom Fucci CB; 21 Carl Karilivacz S; 44 Lee Riley S; 20 Bill Stits CB/RB; 40 Richie Woit CB; Special teams (ST)	Reserve: 33 Bill Bowman RB (Military); 57 Leon Cunningham LB (Military); 26 Gene Gedman RB (Military); 14 Bob Hoernschemeyer RB (IR); -- Yale Lary S (Military); -- Gordon Malloy RB (IR); 70 Gerry Perry DT (Military); -- Ollie Spencer T (Military); Rookies in italics
