= 1953 North Texas State Eagles football team =

American college football season

1953 North Texas State Eagles football
- Conference: Gulf Coast Conference
- Record: 3–6–1 (1–1 GCC)
- Head coach: Odus Mitchell (8th season)
- Home stadium: Eagle Stadium

1953 Gulf Coast Conference football standings
	Conf.					Overall
Team	W		L		T	W		L		T
Trinity (TX) $	2	–	0	–	0	8	–	1	–	0
North Texas State	1	–	1	–	0	3	–	6	–	1
Midwestern (TX)	0	–	2	–	0	2	–	8	–	1
$ – Conference champion

The 1953 North Texas State Eagles football team was an American football team that represented North Texas State College (now known as the University of North Texas) during the 1953 college football season as a member of the Gulf Coast Conference. In their eighth year under head coach Odus Mitchell, the team compiled a 3–6–1 record.

== Schedule ==
Date	Time	Opponent	Site	Result	Attendance	Source
September 26		Arizona State*	Eagle Stadium; Denton, TX	L 0–14		
October 3		at No. 11 Mississippi State*	Scott Field; Starkville, MS	L 6–21	15,000	
October 9		San Diego NAS*	Eagle Stadium; Denton, TX	W 27–12		
October 17		Midwestern (TX)	Eagle Stadium; Denton, TX	W 39–7	6,500	
October 24		at Texas Western*	Kidd Field; El Paso, TX	L 21–26		
October 31		at San Jose State*	Spartan Stadium; San Jose, CA	T 13–13	7,500	
November 7		at No. 12 Ole Miss*	Hemingway Stadium; Oxford, MS	L 7–40		
November 14	2:00 p.m.	West Texas State*^{†}	Eagle Stadium; Denton, TX	W 38–6	12,000–12,500	
November 21		at Hardin–Simmons*	Parramore Field; Abilene, TX	L 10–14	7,000	
November 28	2:00 p.m.	at Trinity (TX)	Alamo Stadium; San Antonio, TX	L 6–14	2,982	
*Non-conference game; ^{†}Homecoming; Rankings from AP Poll released prior to the game; All times are in Central time
