= 1954 North Texas State Eagles football team =

American college football season

1954 North Texas State Eagles football
- Conference: Gulf Coast Conference
- Record: 4–6 (1–1 GCC)
- Head coach: Odus Mitchell (9th season)
- Home stadium: Fouts Field

1954 Gulf Coast Conference football standings
	Conf.					Overall
Team	W		L		T	W		L		T
Trinity (TX) $	2	–	0	–	0	9	–	0	–	0
North Texas State	1	–	1	–	0	4	–	6	–	0
Midwestern (TX)	0	–	2	–	0	4	–	5	–	1
$ – Conference champion

The 1954 North Texas State Eagles football team was an American football team that represented North Texas State College (now known as the University of North Texas) during the 1954 college football season as a member of the Gulf Coast Conference. In their ninth year under head coach Odus Mitchell, the team compiled a 4–6 record.

== Schedule ==
Date	Time	Opponent	Site	Result	Attendance	Source
September 17		at No. 10 Ole Miss*	Hemingway Stadium; Oxford, MS	L 12–35	6,418	
October 2		Mississippi Southern*	Fouts Field; Denton, TX	W 15–7	8,000	
October 9		Hardin–Simmons*	Fouts Field; Denton, TX	W 20–7	8,000	
October 15		at Chattanooga*	Chamberlain Field; Chattanooga, TN	L 19–20	7,000	
October 23		Texas Western*^{†}	Fouts Field; Denton, TX	L 0–6	6,000	
October 30		San Jose State*	Fouts Field; Denton, TX	L 20–27	3,000	
November 6		at Mississippi State*	Scott Field; Starkville, MS	L 26–48	10,000	
November 13		at Arizona State*	Goodwin Stadium; Tempe, AZ	W 20–13	13,000	
November 20	2:00 p.m.	Trinity (TX)	Fouts Field; Denton, TX	L 0–13		
November 25		at Midwestern (TX)	Wichita Falls, TX	W 19–0	6,000	
*Non-conference game; ^{†}Homecoming; Rankings from AP Poll released prior to the game; All times are in Central time
