= 1953 West Texas State Buffaloes football team =

American college football season

1953 West Texas State Buffaloes football
- Conference: Border Conference
- Record: 1–8–1 (0–6 Border)
- Head coach: Frank Kimbrough (7th season)
- Home stadium: Buffalo Stadium

1953 Border Conference football standings
	Conf.					Overall
Team	W		L		T	W		L		T
No. 12 Texas Tech $	5	–	0	–	0	11	–	1	–	0
Hardin–Simmons	4	–	1	–	0	6	–	5	–	0
Texas Western	4	–	2	–	0	8	–	2	–	0
Arizona	3	–	2	–	0	4	–	5	–	1
Arizona State	1	–	3	–	0	4	–	5	–	1
New Mexico A&M	1	–	4	–	0	2	–	7	–	0
West Texas State	0	–	6	–	0	1	–	8	–	1
$ – Conference champion; Rankings from AP Poll

The 1953 West Texas State Buffaloes football team represented West Texas State College—now known as West Texas A&M University—as a member of the Border Conference during the 1953 college football season. Led by seventh-year head coach Frank Kimbrough, the Buffaloes compiled an overall record of 1–8–1 with a mark of 0–6 in conference play, placing last out of seven teams in the Border Conference.

== Schedule ==
Date	Time	Opponent	Site	Result	Attendance	Source
September 19	8:00 p.m.	at Texas Tech	Jones Stadium; Lubbock, TX	L 14–40	13,000–15,000	
September 26	8:00 p.m.	McMurry*	Buffalo Stadium; Canyon, TX	T 20–20	3,500–4,000	
October 10	8:00 p.m.	vs. Trinity (TX)*	Amarillo Stadium; Amarillo, TX	L 6–14		
October 17		at Arizona State	Goodwin Stadium; Tempe, AZ	L 20–39	13,000–14,000	
October 24		Hardin–Simmons^{†}	Buffalo Stadium; Canyon, TX	L 14–26	5,500	
October 31		at Arizona	Arizona Stadium; Tucson, AZ	L 6–39	18,000	
November 7	2:15 p.m.	at Midwestern (TX)*	Midwestern Stadium; Wichita Falls, TX	W 20–14	4,000	
November 14	2:00 p.m.	at North Texas State*	Eagle Stadium; Denton, TX	L 6–38	12,000–12,500	
November 21		at New Mexico A&M	Memorial Stadium; Las Cruces, NM	L 13–19		
November 28	2:00 p.m.	Texas Western	Buffalo Stadium; Canyon, TX	L 7–27	1,000	
*Non-conference game; ^{†}Homecoming; All times are in Central time
