= Billy Stamps =

American football player and coach (1911–1980)

Biographical details
- Born: June 21, 1911
- Died: June 1, 1980 (aged 68); Lawton, Oklahoma, U.S.

Playing career
- 1933–1935: SMU
- Position: Guard

Coaching career (HC unless noted)
- 1946: Duncan HS (OK)
- 1947: Cameron
- 1948–1950: Hardin / Midwestern (TX)

Head coaching record
- Overall: 18–11–2 (college); 10–1 (junior college)
- Bowls: 0–1 (junior college)

Accomplishments and honors

Championships
- 1 OJCC (1947); 2 GCC (1949–1950)

William D. Stamps (June 21, 1911 – June 1, 1980) was an American football player and coach. He was a football coach at Duncan High School in Duncan, Oklahoma before serving as the head football coach at Cameron State Agricultural College—now known as Cameron University—in 1947 andat Midwestern State University from 1948 to 1950. Stamps played college football at Southern Methodist University (SMU).

== Head coaching record ==
=== College ===
Year	Team	Overall	Conference	Standing	Bowl/playoffs
Hardin Indians (Texas Conference) (1948)
1948	Hardin	4–5–1	3–1–1	T–2nd	
Hardin / Midwestern Indians (Gulf Coast Conference) (1949–1950)
1949	Hardin	10–1	3–0	1st	
1950	Midwestern	4–5–1	1–0–1	T–1st	
Hardin / Midwestern:		18–11–2	7–1–2		
Total:		18–11–2			
National championship Conference title Conference division title or championship game berth

=== Junior college ===
Year	Team	Overall	Conference	Standing	Bowl/playoffs
Cameron Aggies (Oklahoma Junior College Conference) (1947)
1947	Cameron	10–1	5–0		W Junior Rose Bowl
Cameron:		10–1	5–0		
Total:		10–1			
National championship Conference title Conference division title or championship game berth
