= 1954 Oklahoma A&M Cowboys football team =

American college football season

1954 Oklahoma A&M Cowboys football
- Conference: Missouri Valley Conference
- Record: 5–4–1 (2–2 MVC)
- Head coach: Jennings B. Whitworth (5th season)
- Home stadium: Lewis Field

1954 Missouri Valley Conference football standings
	Conf.					Overall
Team	W		L		T	W		L		T
Wichita $	4	–	0	–	0	9	–	1	–	0
Houston	3	–	1	–	0	5	–	5	–	0
Oklahoma A&M	2	–	2	–	0	5	–	4	–	0
Detroit	1	–	3	–	0	2	–	7	–	0
Tulsa	0	–	4	–	0	0	–	11	–	0
$ – Conference champion

The 1954 Oklahoma A&M Cowboys football team represented Oklahoma Agricultural and Mechanical College (later renamed Oklahoma State University–Stillwater) in the Missouri Valley Conference during the 1954 college football season. In their fifth and final season under head coach Jennings B. Whitworth, the Cowboys compiled a 5–4–1 record (2–2 against conference opponents), finished in third place in the conference, and outscored opponents by a combined total of 161 to 119.

On offense, the 1954 team averaged 16.1 points scored, 229.3 rushing yards, and 56.5 passing yards per game. On defense, the team allowed an average of 11.9 points scored, 163.0 rushing yards and 68.8 passing yards per game. The team's statistical leaders included fullback Earl Lunsford with 761 rushing yards and 54 points scored, Fred Duvall with 195 passing yards, and Chester Spencer with 119 receiving yards.

Two Oklahoma A&M players received first-team All-Missouri Valley Conference honors: end Bob LaRue and tackle Dale Meinert.

The team played its home games at Lewis Field in Stillwater, Oklahoma.

== Schedule ==
Date	Opponent	Site	Result	Attendance	Source
September 18	at Wyoming*	War Memorial Stadium; Laramie, WY	W 14–6	14,871	
September 25	vs. Texas A&M*	Cotton Bowl; Dallas, TX	W 14–6	14,000	
October 2	at No. 17 Texas Tech*	Jones Stadium; Lubbock, TX	T 13–13	24,500	
October 9	at Wichita	Veterans Field; Wichita, KS	L 13–22	18,321	
October 16	Houston^{†}	Lewis Field; Stillwater, OK	L 7–14	24,000	
October 23	vs. Hardin–Simmons*	Broncho Stadium; Odessa, TX	L 0–13	8,500	
October 30	at Tulsa	Skelly Stadium; Tulsa, Oklahoma (rivalry)	W 12–0	11,000	
November 6	Detroit	Lewis Field; Stillwater, OK	W 34–19	12,000	
November 13	Kansas*	Lewis Field; Stillwater, OK	W 47–12	10,000	
November 27	at No. 3 Oklahoma*	Lewis Field; Stillwater, OK (Bedlam Series)	L 0–14	38,000	
*Non-conference game; ^{†}Homecoming; Rankings from AP Poll released prior to the game

== After the season ==
The 1955 NFL draft was held on January 27–28, 1955. The following Cowboys were selected.

Round	Pick	Player	Position	NFL team
5	59	Leland Kendall	Tackle	Chicago Bears
8	88	Dale Meinert	Linebacker	Baltimore Colts
8	93	Freddie Meyers	Back	San Francisco 49ers
