= 1954 West Texas State Buffaloes football team =

American college football season

1954 West Texas State Buffaloes football
- Conference: Border Conference
- Record: 1–8 (1–5 Border)
- Head coach: Frank Kimbrough (8th season)
- Home stadium: Buffalo Stadium

1954 Border Conference football standings
	Conf.					Overall
Team	W		L		T	W		L		T
Texas Tech $	4	–	0	–	0	7	–	2	–	1
Arizona State	3	–	1	–	0	5	–	5	–	0
Texas Western	4	–	2	–	0	8	–	3	–	0
Arizona	3	–	2	–	0	7	–	3	–	0
Hardin–Simmons	2	–	3	–	0	4	–	6	–	0
West Texas State	1	–	5	–	0	1	–	8	–	0
New Mexico A&M	0	–	4	–	0	0	–	9	–	0
$ – Conference champion

The 1954 West Texas State Buffaloes football team represented West Texas State College (now known as West Texas A&M University) as a member of the Border Conference during the 1954 college football season. Led by eighth-year head coach Frank Kimbrough, the Buffaloes compiled an overall record of 1–8 with a mark of 1–5 in conference play, placing sixth the Border Conference.

== Schedule ==
Date	Opponent	Site	Result	Attendance	Source
September 18	McMurry*	Buffalo Stadium; Canyon, TX	L 18–19		
September 25	at No. 14 Texas Tech	Jones Stadium; Lubbock, TX	L 7–33	14,000	
October 2	Midwestern (TX)*	Buffalo Stadium; Canyon, TX	L 7–14		
October 16	New Mexico A&M^{†}	Buffalo Stadium; Canyon, TX	W 41–7		
October 23	at Arizona State	Goodwin Stadium; Tempe, AZ	L 14–21		
October 30	at Arizona	Arizona Stadium; Tucson, AZ	L 12–48		
November 6	at Trinity (TX)*	Alamo Stadium; San Antonio, TX	L 7–19	10,000	
November 13	at Hardin–Simmons	Parramore Field; Abilene, TX	L 27–33		
November 25	at Texas Western	Kidd Field; El Paso, TX	L 13–33		
*Non-conference game; ^{†}Homecoming; Rankings from AP Poll released prior to the game
