= A. Lee Smith =

American football coach and college athletics administrator (1915–1985)

Biographical details
- Born: October 7, 1915
- Died: November 28, 1985 (aged 70)

Coaching career (HC unless noted)

Football
- 1947: La Vega HS (TX)
- 1948: Hillsboro (assistant)
- 1949: Hillsboro
- 1951–1966: Navarro

Basketball
- 1951–?: Navarro

Track and field
- 1951–?: Navarro

Administrative career (AD unless noted)
- 1951–1966: Navarro

Head coaching record
- Overall: 99–67–2 (junior college football)
- Bowls: 1–1 (junior college football)

Accomplishments and honors

Championships
- Football; 7 TJCC (1951–1953, 1958–1959, 1961–1962)

Arlie Lee Smith (October 7, 1915 – November 28, 1985) was an American football coach and college athletics administrator. He served as the head football coach at Hillsboro Junior College—now known as Hill College–in Hillsboro, Texas for one season, in 1949, and Navarro College in Corsicana, Texas from 1951 to 1966. Smith was also the athletic director at Navarro from 1951 to 1966.

A native of Waco, Texas, Smith graduated in 1947 from Austin College in Sherman, Texas, where he majored in physical education. He began his coaching career at La Vega High School in Bellmead, Texas and then went to Hillsboro Junior College in 1948 as an assistant football coach. He succeed Lloyd Raymer as Hillsboro's head football coach in 1949. Smith was hired as head football coach at Navarro in 1951, succeeding Ken Clark, and also tasked to coach the basketball, and track teams at the school. He stepped down as football coach an athletic director in 1966 to become chairman of the school's physical education program. Al Carmichael succeeded him in both roles.

Smith earned a master's degree from Baylor University. In 1980, he was inducted into Austin College's Athletic Hall of Honor.

== Head coaching record ==
=== Junior college football ===
Year	Team	Overall	Conference	Standing	Bowl/playoffs
Hillsboro Indians (Texas Junior College Conference) (1949)
1949	Hillsboro	8–2	3–1	2nd (East)	
Hillsboro:		8–2	3–1		
Navarro Bulldogs (Texas Junior College Conference) (1951–1963)
1951	Navarro	7–3	5–0	1st	
1952	Navarro	8–2	5–1	T–1st	
1953	Navarro	5–5–1	3–1	T–1st	
1954	Navarro	6–4	4–1	2nd	
1955	Navarro	5–4	3–3	T–3rd	
1956	Navarro	5–4	3–2	3rd	
1957	Navarro	4–6	2–3	4th	
1958	Navarro	5–5	3–1	T–1st	
1959	Navarro	7–2–1	3–0–1	T–1st	
1960	Navarro	4–6	2–1	2nd	
1961	Navarro	6–4	5–1	T–1st	
1962	Navarro	10–1	7–1	T–1st	W Hospitality Bowl
1963	Navarro	5–5	4–4	3rd	
Navarro Bulldogs (Texas Junior College Football Federation) (1964–1966)
1964	Navarro	4–5	4–4	T–5th	
1965	Navarro	5–3	4–3	T–2nd	
1966	Navarro	5–6	3–4	T–4th	L Shrine Hospital Bowl
Navarro:		91–65–2	60–30–1		
Total:		99–67–2			
National championship Conference title Conference division title or championship game berth
