= Clyde B. Smith =

American sportsman, coach, college athletics administrator (1906–1976)

Biographical details
- Born: February 4, 1906; Monongahela, Pennsylvania, U.S.
- Died: July 9, 1976 (aged 70); Tempe, Arizona, U.S.

Playing career
- 1926–1928: Geneva

Coaching career (HC unless noted)
- 1929–1933: Red Stone HS (PA)
- 1934–1937: Indiana (line)
- 1938–1942: La Crosse State
- 1946–1947: La Crosse State
- 1948–1951: Indiana
- 1952–1954: Arizona State

Administrative career (AD unless noted)
- 1955–1971: Arizona State

Head coaching record
- Overall: 52–56–4 (college)

Accomplishments and honors

Championships
- 4 Wisconsin State Teachers Northern Division (1939–1942); 1 Border (1952)

Clyde B. Smith (February 4, 1906 – July 9, 1976) was an American football player, coach, and college athletics administrator. He served as the head football coach at La Crosse State Teachers College—now the University of Wisconsin–La Crosse (1938–1942, 1946–1947), Indiana University (1948–1951), and Arizona State University (1952–1954), compiling a career college football record of 52–56–4. From 1955 to 1971, he was the athletic director at Arizona State.

== Head coaching record ==
=== College ===
Year	Team	Overall	Conference	Standing	Bowl/playoffs
La Crosse State Indians (Wisconsin State College Conference) (1938–1942)
1938	La Crosse State	4–3	3–1	2nd (Northern)	
1939	La Crosse State	3–4	3–1	1st (Northern)	
1940	La Crosse State	6–0	4–0	1st (Northern)	
1941	La Crosse State	5–1	3–1	T–1st (Northern)	
1942	La Crosse State	6–0–1	4–0	1st (Northern)	
La Crosse State Indians (Wisconsin State College Conference) (1946–1947)
1946	La Crosse State	2–4–1	1–2–1	T–4th	
1947	La Crosse State	3–4	2–2	3rd	
La Crosse State:		29–16–2	20–7–1		
Indiana Hoosiers (Big Ten Conference) (1948–1951)
1948	Indiana	2–7	2–4	T–5th	
1949	Indiana	1–8	0–6	9th	
1950	Indiana	3–5–1	1–4	T–8th	
1951	Indiana	2–7	2–4	8th	
Indiana:		8–27–1	4–19		
Arizona State Sun Devils (Border Conference) (1952–1954)
1952	Arizona State	6–3	4–0	1st	
1953	Arizona State	4–5–1	1–3	5th	
1954	Arizona State	5–5	3–1	2nd	
Arizona State:		15–13–1	8–4		
Total:		52–56–4			
National championship Conference title Conference division title or championship game berth
