= 1953 Arizona State Sun Devils football team =

American college football season

1953 Arizona State Sun Devils football
- Conference: Border Conference
- Record: 4–5–1 (1–3 Border)
- Head coach: Clyde B. Smith (2nd season)
- Captains: Dick Curran; Tom Fallon
- Home stadium: Goodwin Stadium

1953 Border Conference football standings
	Conf.					Overall
Team	W		L		T	W		L		T
No. 12 Texas Tech $	5	–	0	–	0	11	–	1	–	0
Hardin–Simmons	4	–	1	–	0	6	–	5	–	0
Texas Western	4	–	2	–	0	8	–	2	–	0
Arizona	3	–	2	–	0	4	–	5	–	1
Arizona State	1	–	3	–	0	4	–	5	–	1
New Mexico A&M	1	–	4	–	0	2	–	7	–	0
West Texas State	0	–	6	–	0	1	–	8	–	1
$ – Conference champion; Rankings from AP Poll

The 1953 Arizona State Sun Devils football team represented Arizona State University in the sport of football during the 1953 college football season. The team was led by head coach Clyde B. Smith. Home games were played at Goodwin Stadium in Tempe, Arizona. Arizona State finished the 1953 football campaign 4–5–1 overall and 1–3 in Border Conference play.

== Schedule ==
Date	Opponent	Site	Result	Attendance	Source
September 19	San Diego NAS*	Goodwin Stadium; Tempe, AZ	L 14–19		
September 26	at North Texas State*	Eagle Stadium; Denton, TX	W 14–0		
October 3	at Texas Western	Kidd Field; El Paso, TX	L 27–28	7,500	
October 10	at San Jose State*	Spartan Stadium; San Jose, CA	W 35–20	12,500	
October 17	West Texas State	Goodwin Stadium; Tempe, AZ	W 39–20	13,000–14,000	
October 24	at Houston*	Rice Stadium; Houston, TX	L 20–24	12,000	
October 31	Hardin–Simmons	Goodwin Stadium; Tempe, AZ	L 20–27	14,000	
November 14	BYU*^{†}	Goodwin Stadium; Tempe, AZ	W 26–18		
November 21	Midwestern (TX)*	Goodwin Stadium; Tempe, AZ	T 12–12	9,000	
November 28	Arizona	Goodwin Stadium; Tempe, AZ (Territorial Cup)	L 0–35	16,000	
*Non-conference game; ^{†}Homecoming
