= 1953 Hardin–Simmons Cowboys football team =

American college football season

1953 Hardin–Simmons Cowboys football
- Conference: Border Conference
- Record: 6–5 (4–1 Border)
- Head coach: Murray Evans (2nd season)
- Home stadium: Parramore Stadium

1953 Border Conference football standings
	Conf.					Overall
Team	W		L		T	W		L		T
No. 12 Texas Tech $	5	–	0	–	0	11	–	1	–	0
Hardin–Simmons	4	–	1	–	0	6	–	5	–	0
Texas Western	4	–	2	–	0	8	–	2	–	0
Arizona	3	–	2	–	0	4	–	5	–	1
Arizona State	1	–	3	–	0	4	–	5	–	1
New Mexico A&M	1	–	4	–	0	2	–	7	–	0
West Texas State	0	–	6	–	0	1	–	8	–	1
$ – Conference champion; Rankings from AP Poll

The 1953 Hardin–Simmons Cowboys football team was an American football team that represented Hardin–Simmons University in the Border Conference during the 1953 college football season. In its second season under head coach Murray Evans, the team compiled a 6–5 record (4–1 against conference opponents), finished in second place in the conference, and was outscored by a total of 211 to 199. The team played its home games at Parramore Field, also known as Parramore Stadium, in Abilene, Texas.

Two Hardin-Simmons players were named to the 1953 All-Border Conference football team: end D.C. Andrews; and center Sam Walker.

== Schedule ==
Date	Time	Opponent	Site	Result	Attendance	Source
September 19		at Oklahoma A&M*	Lewis Field; Stillwater, OK	L 0–20	14,000	
September 26		Midwestern (TX)*	Parramore Field; Abilene, TX	W 33–7	6,500	
October 3	2:30 p.m.	at Trinity (TX)*	Alamo Stadium; San Antonio, TX	L 21–27		
October 10		at No. 11 Rice*	Rice Stadium; Houston, TX	L 0–40	25,000	
October 17		at Tulsa*	Skelly Field; Tulsa, OK	L 13–14	11,500	
October 24		at West Texas State	Buffalo Stadium; Canyon, TX	W 26–14	5,500	
October 31		at Arizona State	Goodwin Stadium; Tempe, AZ	W 27–20	14,000	
November 7		Texas Western	Parramore Field; Abilene, TX	W 14–13	< 5,000	
November 14		New Mexico A&M	Parramore Field; Abilene, TX	W 39–0	3,000	
November 21		North Texas State*^{†}	Parramore Field; Abilene, TX	W 14–10	7,000	
November 28		at Texas Tech	Jones Stadium; Lubbock, TX	L 12–46	15,000	
*Non-conference game; ^{†}Homecoming; Rankings from AP Poll released prior to the game
