= 1953 Texas Western Miners football team =

American college football season

1953 Texas Western Miners football

Sun Bowl, W 37–14 vs. Mississippi Southern
- Conference: Border Conference
- Record: 8–2 (4–2 Border)
- Head coach: Mike Brumbelow (4th season)
- Home stadium: Kidd Field

1953 Border Conference football standings
	Conf.					Overall
Team	W		L		T	W		L		T
No. 12 Texas Tech $	5	–	0	–	0	11	–	1	–	0
Hardin–Simmons	4	–	1	–	0	6	–	5	–	0
Texas Western	4	–	2	–	0	8	–	2	–	0
Arizona	3	–	2	–	0	4	–	5	–	1
Arizona State	1	–	3	–	0	4	–	5	–	1
New Mexico A&M	1	–	4	–	0	2	–	7	–	0
West Texas State	0	–	6	–	0	1	–	8	–	1
$ – Conference champion; Rankings from AP Poll

The 1953 Texas Western Miners football team was an American football team that represented Texas Western College (now known as University of Texas at El Paso) as a member of the Border Conference during the 1953 college football season. In its fourth season under head coach Mike Brumbelow, the team compiled an 8–2 record (4–2 against Border Conference opponents), finished third in the conference, defeated Southern Miss in the 1954 Sun Bowl, and outscored all opponents by a total of 257 to 144.

== Schedule ==
Date	Time	Opponent	Site	Result	Attendance	Source
September 19		Sul Ross*	Kidd Field; El Paso, TX	W 26–7	10,000	
September 26		Texas Tech	Kidd Field; El Paso, TX	L 6–27	7,000	
October 3		Arizona State	Kidd Field; El Paso, TX	W 28–27	7,500	
October 17		New Mexico A&M^{†}	Kidd Field; El Paso, TX	W 39–0		
October 24		North Texas State*	Kidd Field; El Paso, TX	W 26–21		
October 31		Midwestern (TX)*	Kidd Field; El Paso, TX	W 27–7	9,000	
November 7		at Hardin–Simmons	Parramore Field; Abilene, TX	L 13–14		
November 14		at Arizona	Arizona Stadium; Tucson, AZ	W 28–20		
November 28	1:00 p.m.	at West Texas State	Buffalo Stadium; Canyon, TX	W 27–7	1,000	
January 1, 1954		vs. Mississippi Southern*	Kidd Field; El Paso, TX (Sun Bowl)	W 37–14	12,000	
*Non-conference game; ^{†}Homecoming; All times are in Mountain time
