= Clyde Lee (American football) =

American football player and coach (1908–1995)

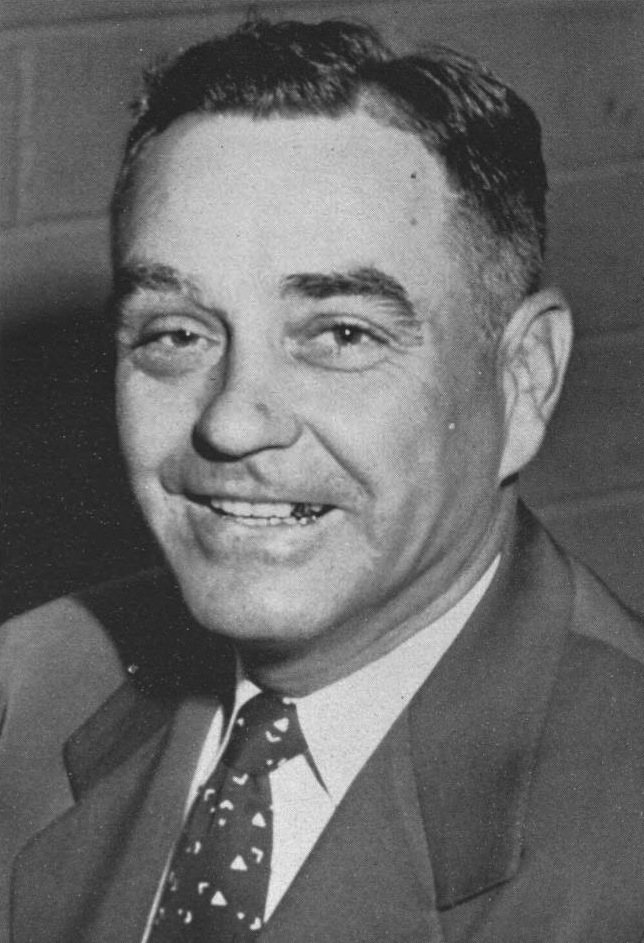
- Lee, c. 1952

Biographical details
- Born: February 11, 1908; Wortham, Texas, U.S.
- Died: December 12, 1995 (aged 87); Lake Jackson, Texas, U.S.

Playing career
- 1930–1932: Centenary
- Position: End

Coaching career (HC unless noted)
- 1932–1935: Overton HS (TX)
- 1935–1941: Kilgore
- 1945–1947: Tulsa (assistant)
- 1948–1954: Houston

Head coaching record
- Overall: 37–32–2 (college); 57–10–5 (junior college)
- Bowls: 1–0

Accomplishments and honors

Championships
- 3 TJCC (1936, 1939, 1941); 1 MVC (1952)

Clyde V. Lee (February 11, 1908 – December 12, 1995) was an American football player and coach. He served as the head football coach at the University of Houston from 1948 to 1954, guiding the Cougars to a 37–32–2 record. Lee played his college career at Centenary College from 1930 to 1932 under Homer Norton. Among his college teammates was Lovette Hill, who later served as his colleague at Houston on his coaching staff and as head baseball coach for the school.

After his college playing career, Lee served as head coach for several sports including football to Overton High School in Overton, Texas. He was paid $90 a month, taught five math classes, a history class, and coached for four sports without an assistant. In three seasons, his record was 28–3–2. Lee then moved into his first college coaching job as head coach for Kilgore College where he compiled a 57–10–5 record before entering the United States Navy. Upon leaving the armed services, he coached at the University of Tulsa under Buddy Brothers for two years.

At Houston, Lee was credited with improving the strength of the Cougars' schedules. This began during the 1949 season, when Houston played its first major opponent, William & Mary. He led the Cougars to their first bowl game berth, to the 1952 Salad Bowl, and a Missouri Valley Conference (MVC) championship in 1952. During his first season, fewer than 100 season tickets were sold by the Cougars, but by 1952, over 10,000 were sold.

After retiring from coaching, Lee moved to Freeport, Texas, and became a regular at Cougars home games. He died on December 12, 1995, at Plantation Health Care Center in Lake Jackson, Texas.

== Head coaching record ==
=== Junior college ===
Year	Team	Overall	Conference	Standing	Bowl/playoffs
Kilgore Rangers (Texas Junior College Conference) (1935–1941)
1935	Kilgore	5–3–2			
1936	Kilgore	10–1		1st	
1937	Kilgore	9–2–1			
1938	Kilgore	8–1–1			
1939	Kilgore	10–0	9–0	1st	
1940	Kilgore	7–2–1			
1941	Kilgore	8–1	6–0	1st	
Kilgore:		57–10–5			
Total:		57–10–5			
National championship Conference title Conference division title or championship game berth

=== College ===
Year	Team	Overall	Conference	Standing	Bowl/playoffs	Coaches^{#}
Houston Cougars (Lone Star Conference) (1948)
1948	Houston	5–6	3–3	4th		
Houston Cougars (Gulf Coast Conference) (1949)
1949	Houston	5–4–1	1–2	3rd		
Houston Cougars (Independent) (1950)
1950	Houston	4–6				
Houston Cougars (Missouri Valley Conference) (1951–1954)
1951	Houston	6–5	2–2	4th	W Salad	
1952	Houston	8–2	3–0	1st		19
1953	Houston	4–4–1	1–2	3rd		
1954	Houston	5–5	3–1	2nd		
Houston:		37–32–2	13–10			
Total:		37–32–2				
National championship Conference title Conference division title or championship game berth
^{#}Rankings from final Coaches Poll.
