= 1954 Trinity Tigers football team =

American college football season

1954 Trinity Tigers football

GCC champion
- Conference: Gulf Coast Conference
- Record: 9–0 (2–0 GCC)
- Head coach: William A. McElreath (3rd season)
- Home stadium: Alamo Stadium

1954 Gulf Coast Conference football standings
| | Conf. | | | | | Overall |
| Team | W | | L | | T | W | | L | | T |
|---|---|---|---|---|---|---|---|---|---|---|
| Trinity (TX) $ | 2 | – | 0 | – | 0 | 9 | – | 0 | – | 0 |
| North Texas State | 1 | – | 1 | – | 0 | 4 | – | 6 | – | 0 |
| Midwestern (TX) | 0 | – | 2 | – | 0 | 4 | – | 5 | – | 1 |
$ – Conference champion

The 1954 Trinity Tigers football team was an American football team that represented Trinity University in San Antonio as a member of the Gulf Coast Conference (GCC) during the 1954 college football season. Led by third-year head coach William A. McElreath, the Tigers compiled an overall record of 9–0 with a mark of 2–0 in conference play, winning the GCC title.

== Schedule ==
| Date | Time | Opponent | Site | Result | Attendance | Source |
|---|---|---|---|---|---|---|
| September 18 | 8:00 p.m. | at Southwest Texas State* | San Marcos, TX | W 26–7 | | |
| September 25 | 8:00 p.m. | Midwestern (TX) | Alamo Stadium; San Antonio, TX | W 20–7 | 9,928 | |
| October 2 | | at Hardin–Simmons* | Parramore Field; Abilene, TX | W 14–0 | 6,000 | |
| October 9 | | at East Texas State* | Memorial Stadium; Commerce, TX | W 6–0 | | |
| October 16 | 8:00 p.m. | at Texas Western* | Kidd Field; El Paso, TX | W 20–14 | 7,500 | |
| October 30 | | McNeese State* | Alamo Stadium; San Antonio, TX | W 68–0 | | |
| November 6 | | West Texas State* | Alamo Stadium; San Antonio, TX | W 19–7 | 10,000 | |
| November 20 | 2:00 p.m. | at North Texas State | Fouts Field; Denton, TX | W 13–0 | | |
| November 26 | | Texas A&I* | Alamo Stadium; San Antonio, TX | W 41–6 | | |
*Non-conference game
