= William A. McElreath =

American football coach and administrator (1915–1993)

Biographical details
- Born: September 25, 1915; Sulphur Springs, Texas, U.S.
- Died: April 18, 1993 (aged 77); San Antonio, Texas, U.S.

Playing career
- 1937–1938: Vanderbilt
- 1940: Vanderbilt
- Position: End

Coaching career (HC unless noted)
- 1941: Morgan School (TN)
- 1946–1951: Tulane (assistant)
- 1952–1961: Trinity (TX)

Administrative career (AD unless noted)
- 1952–1962: Trinity (TX)

Head coaching record
- Overall: 47–42–2 (college)

Accomplishments and honors

Championships
- 3 GCC (1953–1954, 1956)

William Anderson "Dutch" McElreath (September 25, 1915 – April 18, 1993) was an American football coach and college athletics administrator. He served as the head football coach at Trinity University in San Antonio from 1952 to 1961, compiling a record of 47–42–2. McElreath was also the athletic director at Trinity from 1952 to 1962.

A native of Sulphur Springs, Texas, McElreath attended Greenville High School in Greenville, Texas, where he played football as an end under coach Henry Frnka. He then played college football at Vanderbilt University, lettering in 1937, 1938, and 1940. A back injury he sustained late in 1938 prevented him from playing in 1939.

In February 1941, McElreath was appointed head football coach at Morgan School in Petersburg, Tennessee. He graduated from Vanderbilt that June and coached at Morgan in the fall of 1941. McElreath enlisted in the United States Coast Guard in 1942 and was assigned to the Coast Guard's physical education program run by Jack Dempsey, former heavyweight boxing champion. During World War II, he spent 18 months in the Pacific theater on an amphibious cargo ship and served in the Bougainville campaign.

After the war, McElreath returned to coaching and reunited with Frnka, who was then head football coach at Tulane University. McElreath worked for six seasons as an assistant at Tulane under Frnka.

In February 1962, McElreath was reassigned to an administrative position as a development program counselor at Trinity. He was succeeded as head football coach by W. C. McElhannon.

== Head coaching record ==
=== College ===
Year	Team	Overall	Conference	Standing	Bowl/playoffs
Trinity Tigers (Gulf Coast Conference) (1952–1956)
1952	Trinity	4–6	0–2	3rd	
1953	Trinity	8–1	2–0	1st	
1954	Trinity	9–0	2–0	1st	
1955	Trinity	5–4	1–2	3rd	
1956	Trinity	5–3–1	2–0–1	T–1st	
Trinity Tigers (Independent) (1957–1961)
1957	Trinity	3–5			
1958	Trinity	6–3			
1959	Trinity	3–6			
1960	Trinity	2–7–1			
1961	Trinity	2–7			
Trinity:		47–42–2	7–4–1		
Total:		47–42–2			
National championship Conference title Conference division title or championship game berth
