= 1953 Trinity Tigers football team =

American college football season

1953 Trinity Tigers football

GCC champion
- Conference: Gulf Coast Conference
- Record: 8–1 (2–0 GCC)
- Head coach: William A. McElreath (2nd season)
- Home stadium: Alamo Stadium

1953 Gulf Coast Conference football standings
	Conf.					Overall
Team	W		L		T	W		L		T
Trinity (TX) $	2	–	0	–	0	8	–	1	–	0
North Texas State	1	–	1	–	0	3	–	6	–	1
Midwestern (TX)	0	–	2	–	0	2	–	8	–	1
$ – Conference champion

The 1953 Trinity Tigers football team was an American football team that represented Trinity University in San Antonio as a member of the Gulf Coast Conference (GCC) during the 1953 college football season. Led by second-year head coach William A. McElreath, the Tigers compiled an overall record of 8–1 with a mark of 2–0 in conference play, winning the GCC title.

== Schedule ==
Date	Time	Opponent	Site	Result	Attendance	Source
September 19		Southwest Texas State*	Alamo Stadium; San Antonio, TX	W 40–21		
September 26		East Texas State*	Alamo Stadium; San Antonio, TX	L 19–20	5,000	
October 3	2:30 p.m.	Hardin–Simmons*	Alamo Stadium; San Antonio, TX	W 27–21		
October 10	8:00 p.m.	vs. West Texas State*	Amarillo Stadium; Amarillo, TX	W 14–6		
October 17		at Texas A&I*	Javelina Stadium; Kingsville, TX	W 19–12	3,000	
October 31		at McNeese State*	Killen Field; Lake Charles, LA	W 20–0	1,500	
November 7		Sul Ross*	Alamo Stadium; San Antonio, TX	W 14–0	3,300	
November 14	8:00 p.m.	Midwestern (TX)^{†}	Alamo Stadium; San Antonio, TX	W 62–7	4,151	
November 28	2:00 p.m.	North Texas State	Alamo Stadium; San Antonio, TX	W 14–6	2,982	
*Non-conference game; ^{†}Homecoming
