= 1950 Midwestern Indians football team =

American college football season

1950 Midwestern Indians football

GCC co-champion
- Conference: Gulf Coast Conference
- Record: 4–5–1 (1–0–1 GCC)
- Head coach: Billy Stamps (3rd season)
- Home stadium: Coyote Stadium

1950 Gulf Coast Conference football standings
	Conf.					Overall
Team	W		L		T	W		L		T
North Texas State +	1	–	0	–	1	7	–	2	–	1
Midwestern (TX) +	1	–	0	–	1	4	–	5	–	1
Trinity (TX)	0	–	2	–	0	5	–	4	–	1
+ – Conference co-champions

The 1950 Midwestern Indians football team was an American football team that represented Midwestern University—now known as Midwestern State University–as a member of the Gulf Coast Conference (GCC) during the 1950 college football season. Led by Billy Stamps in his third and final season as head coach, the Indians compiled an overall record of 4–5–1 with a mark of 1–0–1 in conference play, sharing the GCC title with North Texas State. Midwestern played home games at Coyote Stadium in Wichita Falls, Texas.

== Schedule ==
Date	Time	Opponent	Site	Result	Attendance	Source
September 16	8:00 p.m.	Southwestern Oklahoma State*	Coyote Stadium; Wichita Falls, TX	W 40–6	7,000	
September 23	8:00 p.m.	McMurry*	Coyote Stadium; Wichita Falls, TX	L 6–19	10,000	
September 30	8:30 p.m.	at Austin*	Sherman, TX	L 13–27		
October 7	5:00 p.m.	at National Autonomous University of Mexico*	Olympic Stadium; Mexico City, Mexico	W 67–6	10,000	
October 13	8:00 p.m.	North Texas State	Coyote Stadium; Wichita Falls, TX	T 7–7	9,000	
October 21	2:15 p.m.	East Texas State*	Coyote Stadium; Wichita Falls, TX	L 27–35	5,500	
October 28	2:15 p.m.	Abilene Christian*^{†}	Coyote Stadium; Wichita Falls, TX	L 0–13	11,000	
November 4	2:15 p.m.	Sam Houston State*	Coyote Stadium; Wichita Falls, TX	W 23–20	3,500	
November 11	2:15 p.m.	Trinity (TX)	Coyote Stadium; Wichita Falls, TX	W 30–14	7,000	
November 24	8:00 p.m.	at Houston*	Public School Stadium; Houston, TX	L 18–40	2,500	
*Non-conference game; ^{†}Homecoming; All times are in Central time
