= 1954 Arizona State Sun Devils football team =

American college football season

1954 Arizona State Sun Devils football
- Conference: Border Conference
- Record: 5–5 (3–1 Border)
- Head coach: Clyde B. Smith (3rd season)
- Home stadium: Goodwin Stadium

1954 Border Conference football standings
| | Conf. | | | | | Overall |
| Team | W | | L | | T | W | | L | | T |
|---|---|---|---|---|---|---|---|---|---|---|
| Texas Tech $ | 4 | – | 0 | – | 0 | 7 | – | 2 | – | 1 |
| Arizona State | 3 | – | 1 | – | 0 | 5 | – | 5 | – | 0 |
| Texas Western | 4 | – | 2 | – | 0 | 8 | – | 3 | – | 0 |
| Arizona | 3 | – | 2 | – | 0 | 7 | – | 3 | – | 0 |
| Hardin–Simmons | 2 | – | 3 | – | 0 | 4 | – | 6 | – | 0 |
| West Texas State | 1 | – | 5 | – | 0 | 1 | – | 8 | – | 0 |
| New Mexico A&M | 0 | – | 4 | – | 0 | 0 | – | 9 | – | 0 |
$ – Conference champion

The 1954 Arizona State Sun Devils football team was an American football team that represented Arizona State College in the Border Conference during the 1954 college football season. In their third and final season under head coach Clyde B. Smith, the Sun Devils compiled an 5–5 record (3–1 against Border opponents) and were outscored by their opponents 178 to 228.

== Schedule ==
| Date | Opponent | Site | Result | Attendance | Source |
|---|---|---|---|---|---|
| September 18 | Hawaii* | Goodwin Stadium; Tempe, AZ | W 28–14 | 12,000 | |
| September 24 | at BYU* | Cougar Stadium; Provo, UT | W 28–19 | | |
| October 2 | Texas Western | Goodwin Stadium; Tempe, AZ | W 34–27 | | |
| October 9 | San Jose State* | Goodwin Stadium; Tempe, AZ | L 12–19 | 14,000 | |
| October 16 | at Midwestern (TX)* | Coyote Stadium; Wichita Falls, TX | L 7–14 | 6,500 | |
| October 23 | West Texas State | Goodwin Stadium; Tempe, AZ | W 21–14 | | |
| October 30 | at Hardin–Simmons | Parramore Stadium; Abilene, TX | W 14–13 | | |
| November 6 | No. 13 Cincinnati* | Goodwin Stadium; Tempe, AZ | L 7–34 | 13,000 | |
| November 13 | North Texas State* | Goodwin Stadium; Tempe, AZ | L 13–20 | 13,000 | |
| November 20 | at Arizona | Arizona Stadium; Tucson, AZ (rivalry) | L 14–54 | 25,500 | |
*Non-conference game; Rankings from Coaches' Poll released prior to the game
