= 1954 San Jose State Spartans football team =

American college football season

1954 San Jose State Spartans football
- Conference: Independent
- Record: 7–3
- Head coach: Bob Bronzan (5th season)
- Home stadium: Spartan Stadium

1954 Western college football independents records
	Conf.			Overall
Team	W	L	T	W		L		T
San Jose State		–		7	–	3	–	0
Pacific (CA)		–		4	–	5	–	0
Hawaii		–		4	–	4	–	0
La Verne		–		2	–	6	–	0
Cal Poly San Dimas		–		1	–	8	–	0

The 1954 San Jose State Spartans football team represented San Jose State College—now known as San Jose State University—as an independent during the 1954 college football season. Led by fifth-year head coach Bob Bronzan, the Spartans compiled a record of 7–3 and outscored opponents 191 to 151. The team played home games at Spartan Stadium in San Jose, California.

== Schedule ==
Date	Opponent	Site	Result	Attendance	Source
September 18	Utah State	Spartan Stadium; San Jose, CA	W 20–0	12,000	
September 25	at No. 17 California	California Memorial Stadium; Berkeley, CA	W 0–45	32,000	
October 2	at Idaho	Neale Stadium; Moscow, ID	L 38–7	10,000	
October 9	at Arizona State	Goodwin Stadium; Tempe, AZ	W 19–12	14,000	
October 23	at Oregon	Hayward Field; Eugene, OR	L 7–26	10,000	
October 30	at North Texas State	Fouts Field; Denton, TX	W 27–20	3,000	
November 6	at Pacific (CA)	Pacific Memorial Stadium; Stockton, CA (Victory Bell)	L 7–13	18,000	
November 13	at Stanford	Stanford Stadium; Stanford, CA (rivalry)	W 19–14	16,000	
November 19	Fresno State	Spartan Stadium; San Jose, CA (rivalry)	W 28–0	10,000	
November 27	New Mexico	Spartan Stadium; San Jose, CA	W 26–14	10,000	
Rankings from AP Poll released prior to the game

== Team players in the NFL ==
The following San Jose State players were selected in the 1955 NFL draft.

Player	Position	Round	Overall	NFL team
Tom Louderback	Linebacker, center, guard	10	111	Washington Redskins
Matt Vujevich	Back	24	284	New York Giants

The following finished their San Jose State career in 1954, were not drafted, but played in the AFL.

Player	Position	First NFL team
Charlie Hardy	Split end, wide receiver	1960 Oakland Raiders
