= 1953 New Mexico A&M Aggies football team =

American college football season

1953 New Mexico A&M Aggies football
- Conference: Border Conference
- Record: 2–7 (1–4 Border)
- Head coach: James Patton (1st season)
- Home stadium: Memorial Stadium

1953 Border Conference football standings
	Conf.					Overall
Team	W		L		T	W		L		T
No. 12 Texas Tech $	5	–	0	–	0	11	–	1	–	0
Hardin–Simmons	4	–	1	–	0	6	–	5	–	0
Texas Western	4	–	2	–	0	8	–	2	–	0
Arizona	3	–	2	–	0	4	–	5	–	1
Arizona State	1	–	3	–	0	4	–	5	–	1
New Mexico A&M	1	–	4	–	0	2	–	7	–	0
West Texas State	0	–	6	–	0	1	–	8	–	1
$ – Conference champion; Rankings from AP Poll

The 1953 New Mexico A&M Aggies football team was an American football team that represented New Mexico College of Agriculture and Mechanical Arts (now known as New Mexico State University) as a member of the Border Conference during the 1953 college football season. In their first year under head coach James Patton, the Aggies compiled a 2–7 record (1–4 against conference opponents), finished sixth in the conference, and were outscored by a total of 316 to 56. The team played home games at Memorial Stadium in Las Cruces, New Mexico.

== Schedule ==
Date	Opponent	Site	Result	Attendance	Source
September 19	at Wyoming*	War Memorial Stadium; Laramie, WY	L 0–47	7,188	
September 26	Colorado College*	Memorial Stadium; Las Cruces, NM	W 12–7		
October 3	at Arizona	Arizona Stadium; Tucson, AZ	L 7–46	14,000	
October 10	McMurry*	Memorial Stadium; Las Cruces, NM	L 12–26		
October 17	at Texas Western	Kidd Field; El Paso, TX (rivalry)	L 0–39		
October 24	at Texas Tech	Jones Stadium; Lubbock, TX	L 0–71	6,000	
November 7	New Mexico*	Memorial Stadium; Las Cruces, NM (rivalry)	L 6–28		
November 14	at Hardin–Simmons	Parramore Field; Abilene, TX	L 0–39	3,000	
November 21	West Texas State	Memorial Stadium; Las Cruces, NM	W 19–13		
*Non-conference game
