= 1954 Texas Western Miners football team =

American college football season

1954 Texas Western Miners football

Sun Bowl champion

Sun Bowl, W 47–20 vs. Florida State
- Conference: Border Conference
- Record: 8–3 (4–2 Border)
- Head coach: Mike Brumbelow (5th season)
- Home stadium: Kidd Field

1954 Border Conference football standings
	Conf.					Overall
Team	W		L		T	W		L		T
Texas Tech $	4	–	0	–	0	7	–	2	–	1
Arizona State	3	–	1	–	0	5	–	5	–	0
Texas Western	4	–	2	–	0	8	–	3	–	0
Arizona	3	–	2	–	0	7	–	3	–	0
Hardin–Simmons	2	–	3	–	0	4	–	6	–	0
West Texas State	1	–	5	–	0	1	–	8	–	0
New Mexico A&M	0	–	4	–	0	0	–	9	–	0
$ – Conference champion

The 1954 Texas Western Miners football team was an American football team that represented Texas Western College (now known as University of Texas at El Paso) as a member of the Border Conference during the 1954 college football season. In its fifth season under head coach Mike Brumbelow, the team compiled an 8–3 record (4–2 against Border Conference opponents), finished third in the conference, defeated Florida State in the Sun Bowl, and outscored all opponents by a total of 290 to 197.

== Schedule ==
Date	Time	Opponent	Site	Result	Attendance	Source
September 18		Sul Ross*	Kidd Field; El Paso, TX	W 35–14	14,000	
September 25		McMurry*	Kidd Field; El Paso, TX	W 27–6		
October 2		at Arizona State	Goodwin Stadium; Tempe, AZ	L 27–34	15,000	
October 9		at Texas Tech	Jones Stadium; Lubbock, TX	L 28–55	15,000	
October 16	8:00 p.m.	Trinity (TX)*	Kidd Field; El Paso, TX	L 14–20	7,500	
October 23		at North Texas State*	Fouts Field; Denton, TX	W 6–0	6,000	
October 30		at New Mexico A&M	Memorial Stadium; Las Cruces, NM	W 12–7		
November 6		Hardin–Simmons^{†}	Kidd Field; El Paso, TX	W 20–7		
November 13		Arizona	Kidd Field; El Paso, TX	W 41–21		
November 25		West Texas State	Kidd Field; El Paso, TX	W 33–13		
January 1, 1955		vs. Florida State*	Kidd Field; El Paso, TX (Sun Bowl)	W 47–20	14,000	
*Non-conference game; ^{†}Homecoming; All times are in Central time
