= 1953 Oklahoma A&M Cowboys football team =

American college football season

1953 Oklahoma A&M Cowboys football

MVC co-champion
- Conference: Missouri Valley Conference
- Record: 7–3 (3–1 MVC)
- Head coach: Jennings B. Whitworth (4th season)
- Home stadium: Lewis Field

1953 Missouri Valley Conference football standings
| | Conf. | | | | | Overall |
| Team | W | | L | | T | W | | L | | T |
|---|---|---|---|---|---|---|---|---|---|---|
| Oklahoma A&M + | 3 | – | 1 | – | 0 | 7 | – | 3 | – | 0 |
| Detroit + | 3 | – | 1 | – | 0 | 5 | – | 4 | – | 0 |
| Wichita | 1 | – | 2 | – | 0 | 4 | – | 4 | – | 1 |
| Houston | 1 | – | 2 | – | 0 | 4 | – | 4 | – | 1 |
| Tulsa | 1 | – | 3 | – | 0 | 3 | – | 7 | – | 0 |
+ – Conference co-champions

The 1953 Oklahoma A&M Cowboys football team represented Oklahoma Agricultural and Mechanical College (later renamed Oklahoma State University–Stillwater) in the Missouri Valley Conference during the 1953 college football season. In their fourth season under head coach Jennings B. Whitworth, the Cowboys compiled a 7–3 record (3–1 against conference opponents), tied with Detroit for the Missouri Valley championship, and outscored opponents by a combined total of 178 to 149.

On offense, the 1953 team averaged 17.8 points scored, 226.5 rushing yards, and 47.9 passing yards per game. On defense, the team allowed an average of 14.9 points scored, 164.8 rushing yards and 78.4 passing yards per game. The team's statistical leaders included Earl Lunsford with 748 rushing yards, Bobby Green with 219 passing yards, and Bob LaRue with 122 receiving yards.

Four Oklahoma A&M players received first-team All-Missouri Valley Conference honors: end Bob LaRue, tackle Dale Meinert, and backs Bill Bredde, and Earl Lunsford.

The team played its home games at Lewis Field in Stillwater, Oklahoma.

== Schedule ==
| Date | Opponent | Site | Result | Attendance | Source |
|---|---|---|---|---|---|
| September 19 | Hardin–Simmons | Lewis Field; Stillwater, OK | W 20–0 | | |
| September 26 | at Arkansas | War Memorial Stadium; Little Rock, AR | W 7–6 | | |
| October 3 | Texas Tech | Lewis Field; Stillwater, OK | L 13–27 | 10,000 | |
| October 10 | Wichita | Lewis Field; Stillwater, OK | W 14–7 | 11,000 | |
| October 17 | at Houston | Rice Stadium; Houston, TX | W 14–7 | 25,000 | |
| October 24 | at Detroit | University of Detroit Stadium; Detroit, MI | L 14–18 | 14,900 | |
| October 31 | Tulsa | Lewis Field; Stillwater, OK (rivalry) | W 28–14 | 18,000 | |
| November 7 | Wyoming^{†} | Lewis Field; Stillwater, OK | W 20–14 | 19,000 | |
| November 14 | at Kansas | Memorial Stadium; Lawrence, KS | W 41–14 | 17,000 | |
| November 28 | at No. 4 Oklahoma | Oklahoma Memorial Stadium; Norman, OK (Bedlam) | L 7–42 | 50,524 | |
^{†}Homecoming; Rankings from AP Poll released prior to the game

== After the season ==
The 1954 NFL draft was held on January 28, 1954. The following Cowboys were selected.

| Round | Pick | Player | Position | NFL team |
|---|---|---|---|---|
| 4 | 38 | Bill Bredde | Back | Chicago Cardinals |
| 26 | 308 | Dorsey Gibson | Back | Washington Redskins |
