= 1953 Tulsa Golden Hurricane football team =

American college football season

1953 Tulsa Golden Hurricane football
- Conference: Missouri Valley Conference
- Record: 3–7 (1–3 MVC)
- Head coach: Bernie Witucki (1st season)
- Home stadium: Skelly Field

1953 Missouri Valley Conference football standings
	Conf.					Overall
Team	W		L		T	W		L		T
Oklahoma A&M +	3	–	1	–	0	7	–	3	–	0
Detroit +	3	–	1	–	0	5	–	4	–	0
Wichita	1	–	2	–	0	4	–	4	–	1
Houston	1	–	2	–	0	4	–	4	–	1
Tulsa	1	–	3	–	0	3	–	7	–	0
+ – Conference co-champions

The 1953 Tulsa Golden Hurricane football team represented the University of Tulsa during the 1953 college football season. In their first year under head coach Bernie Witucki, the Golden Hurricane compiled a 3–7 record, 1–3 against Missouri Valley Conference opponents, and finished in last place in the conference.

== Schedule ==
Date	Opponent	Site	Result	Attendance	Source
September 19	Cincinnati*	Skelly Field; Tulsa, OK	L 7–14	14,057	
September 26	at Wichita	Veterans Field; Wichita, KS	L 10–19	10,100–10,500	
October 3	at Pacific (CA)*	Pacific Memorial Stadium; Stockton, CA	W 22–13	20,121	
October 10	at Alabama*	Denny Stadium; Tuscaloosa, AL	L 13–41	18,000	
October 17	Hardin–Simmons*	Skelly Field; Tulsa, OK	W 14–13	11,500	
October 31	at Oklahoma A&M	Lewis Field; Stillwater, OK (rivalry)	L 14–28	18,000	
November 7	Houston^{†}	Skelly Field; Tulsa, OK	W 23–21	10,000–15,000	
November 14	No. 19 Texas Tech*	Skelly Field; Tulsa, OK	L 7–49	9,000–12,000	
November 21	Detroit	Skelly Field; Tulsa, OK	L 0–33	7,000	
November 28	at Arkansas*	Razorback Stadium; Fayetteville, AR	L 7–27	8,500	
*Non-conference game; ^{†}Homecoming; Rankings from Coaches' Poll released prior to the game

== After the season ==
=== 1954 NFL draft ===
The following Golden Hurricane players were selected in the 1954 NFL draft following the season.

Round	Pick	Player	Position	NFL club
3	31	Tom Miner	Kicker	Pittsburgh Steelers
6	73	Dick Kercher	Halfback	Detroit Lions
9	107	Ted Connolly	Guard	San Francisco 49ers
10	117	Ed Hughes	Defensive back	Los Angeles Rams
