= 1953 Houston Cougars football team =

American college football season

1953 Houston Cougars football
- Conference: Missouri Valley Conference
- Record: 4–4–1 (1–2 MVC)
- Head coach: Clyde Lee (6th season)
- Captains: Buddy Gillioz; Paul Carr
- Home stadium: Rice Stadium

1953 Missouri Valley Conference football standings
	Conf.					Overall
Team	W		L		T	W		L		T
Oklahoma A&M +	3	–	1	–	0	7	–	3	–	0
Detroit +	3	–	1	–	0	5	–	4	–	0
Wichita	1	–	2	–	0	4	–	4	–	1
Houston	1	–	2	–	0	4	–	4	–	1
Tulsa	1	–	3	–	0	3	–	7	–	0
+ – Conference co-champions

The 1953 Houston Cougars football team was an American football team that represented the University of Houston in the Missouri Valley Conference (MVC) during the 1953 college football season. In its sixth season under head coach Clyde Lee, the team compiled a 4–4–1 record (1–2 against conference opponents) and tied for third place out of five teams in the MVC. Buddy Gillioz and Paul Carr were the team captains. The team played its home games at Rice Stadium in Houston.

== Schedule ==
Date	Opponent	Site	Result	Attendance	Source
September 26	at Texas A&M*	Kyle Field; College Station, TX	T 14–14	35,000	
October 3	at No. 17 Texas*	Memorial Stadium; Austin, TX	L 7–28	30,000	
October 9	at Detroit	University of Detroit Stadium; Detroit, MI	W 25–19	12,650	
October 17	Oklahoma A&M	Rice Stadium; Houston, TX	L 7–14	25,000	
October 24	Arizona State*	Rice Stadium; Houston, TX	W 24–20	12,000	
November 7	at Tulsa	Skelly Field; Tulsa, OK	L 21–23	10,000–15,000	
November 14	at No. 9 Baylor*	Baylor Stadium; Waco, TX (rivalry)	W 37–7	15,000	
November 21	No. 17 Texas Tech*	Rice Stadium; Houston, TX (rivalry)	L 21–41	15,000–20,000	
December 5	Tennessee*^{†}	Rice Stadium; Houston, TX	W 33–19	23,000	
*Non-conference game; ^{†}Homecoming; Rankings from AP Poll released prior to the game
