= 1953 Detroit Titans football team =

American college football season

1953 Detroit Titans football

MVC co-champion
- Conference: Missouri Valley Conference
- Record: 6-4 (3–1 MVC)
- Head coach: Dutch Clark (3rd season)
- Captains: Dick Martwick; Denny McCotter
- Home stadium: University of Detroit Stadium

1953 Missouri Valley Conference football standings
	Conf.					Overall
Team	W		L		T	W		L		T
Oklahoma A&M +	3	–	1	–	0	7	–	3	–	0
Detroit +	3	–	1	–	0	5	–	4	–	0
Wichita	1	–	2	–	0	4	–	4	–	1
Houston	1	–	2	–	0	4	–	4	–	1
Tulsa	1	–	3	–	0	3	–	7	–	0
+ – Conference co-champions

The 1953 Detroit Titans football team represented the University of Detroit in the Missouri Valley Conference (MVC) during the 1953 college football season. In its third year under head coach Dutch Clark, Detroit compiled a 6–4 record (3–1 against conference opponents), tied for the MVC championship, and outscored all opponents by a combined total of 231 to 124.

The team's assistant coaches were Wally Fromhart (backfield coach, third year), Kenneth L. Stilley (line coach, first year), Edmund J. Barbour (freshman coach since 1931), and Dr. Raymond D. Forsyth (team physician). The team co-captains were guard Denny McCotter and tackle Dick Martwick.

== Schedule ==
Date	Opponent	Site	Result	Attendance	Source
September 18	North Dakota State*	University of Detroit Stadium; Detroit, MI	W 33–6	18,200	
September 25	Wayne*	University of Detroit Stadium; Detroit, MI	W 48–0	19,300	
October 2	Fordham*	University of Detroit Stadium; Detroit, MI	L 7–21	14,900	
October 9	Houston	University of Detroit Stadium; Detroit, MI	L 19–25	12,650	
October 16	at Villanova*	Connie Mack Stadium; Philadelphia, PA	W 27–0	7,815	
October 24	Oklahoma A&M	University of Detroit Stadium; Detroit, MI	W 18–14	14,900	
November 7	at Marquette*	Marquette Stadium; Milwaukee, WI	L 0–19	13,500	
November 15	at Boston College*	Fenway Park; Boston, MA	L 20–33	7,628	
November 21	at Tulsa	Skelly Stadium; Tulsa, OK	W 33–0	7,000	
November 26	at Wichita	Veterans Field; Wichita, KS	W 26–6	9,585–9,985	
*Non-conference game
