= 1954 Arizona Wildcats football team =

American college football season

1954 Arizona Wildcats football
- Conference: Border Conference
- Record: 7–3 (3–2 Border)
- Head coach: Warren Woodson (3rd season)
- Captains: Buddy Lewis; Glen Bowers
- Home stadium: Arizona Stadium

1954 Border Conference football standings
	Conf.					Overall
Team	W		L		T	W		L		T
Texas Tech $	4	–	0	–	0	7	–	2	–	1
Arizona State	3	–	1	–	0	5	–	5	–	0
Texas Western	4	–	2	–	0	8	–	3	–	0
Arizona	3	–	2	–	0	7	–	3	–	0
Hardin–Simmons	2	–	3	–	0	4	–	6	–	0
West Texas State	1	–	5	–	0	1	–	8	–	0
New Mexico A&M	0	–	4	–	0	0	–	9	–	0
$ – Conference champion

The 1954 Arizona Wildcats football team represented the University of Arizona in the Border Conference during the 1954 college football season. In their third season under head coach Warren B. Woodson, the Wildcats compiled a 7–3 record (3–2 against Border opponents) and outscored their opponents, 385 to 215. The team captains were Buddy Lewis and Glen Bowers. The team played its home games in Arizona Stadium in Tucson, Arizona.

The team's average of 38.5 points per game was the second highest in major college football during the 1954 season. Tailback Art Luppino was the NCAA rushing leader with 1,359 rushing yards. Luppino also broke the NCAA modern-era single-season scoring record with 166 points scored in 1954.

== Schedule ==
Date	Opponent	Site	Result	Attendance	Source
September 18	New Mexico A&M	Arizona Stadium; Tucson, AZ	W 58–0	15,000	
September 25	at Utah*	Ute Stadium; Salt Lake City, UT	W 54–20	12,479	
October 9	Colorado*	Arizona Stadium; Tucson, AZ	L 18–40	25,000	
October 16	Idaho*	Arizona Stadium; Tucson, AZ	W 35–13	17,000	
October 23	at New Mexico*	Zimmerman Field; Albuquerque, NM (rivalry)	W 41–7	11,000	
October 30	West Texas State	Arizona Stadium; Tucson, AZ	W 48–12		
November 6	Texas Tech	Arizona Stadium; Tucson, AZ	L 14–28	23,000	
November 13	at Texas Western	Kidd Field; El Paso, TX	L 21–41		
November 20	Arizona State	Arizona Stadium; Tucson, AZ (rivalry)	W 54–14	25,500	
November 27	Wyoming*	Arizona Stadium; Tucson, AZ	W 42–40	12,000	
*Non-conference game
