= Bernie Witucki =

American football player and coach (1911–2000)

Biographical details
- Born: February 25, 1911; South Bend, Indiana, U.S.
- Died: April 8, 2000 (aged 89); South Bend, Indiana, U.S.
- Education: Notre Dame, George Washington

Coaching career (HC unless noted)
- 1935–1943: Washington HS (IN)
- 1946–1948: Evansville Memorial HS (IN)
- 1949–1952: Tulsa (assistant)
- 1953–1954: Tulsa
- 1955–1958: Notre Dame (assistant)

Head coaching record
- Overall: 3–18 (college); 72–14–8 (high school)

Bernard Francis Witucki (February 25, 1911 – April 8, 2000) was an American football player and coach. From 1935 to 1943, he was the head football coach at Washington High School in South Bend, Indiana, compiling a 60–10–6 record. He was also the head football coach for the Tulsa Golden Hurricane football team during the 1953 and 1954 seasons. He was fired after the 1954 team compiled a winless 0–11 record. He died in 2000 at age 89 at his home in South Bend, Indiana.

== Head coaching record ==
=== College ===
Year	Team	Overall	Conference	Standing	Bowl/playoffs
Tulsa Golden Hurricane (Missouri Valley Conference) (1953–1954)
1953	Tulsa	3–7	1–3	5th	
1954	Tulsa	0–11	0–4	5th	
Tulsa:		3–18	1–7		
Total:		3–18			
