= 1954 Hardin–Simmons Cowboys football team =

American college football season

1954 Hardin–Simmons Cowboys football
- Conference: Border Conference
- Record: 4–6 (2–3 Border)
- Head coach: Murray Evans (3rd season)
- Home stadium: Parramore Stadium

1954 Border Conference football standings
	Conf.					Overall
Team	W		L		T	W		L		T
Texas Tech $	4	–	0	–	0	7	–	2	–	1
Arizona State	3	–	1	–	0	5	–	5	–	0
Texas Western	4	–	2	–	0	8	–	3	–	0
Arizona	3	–	2	–	0	7	–	3	–	0
Hardin–Simmons	2	–	3	–	0	4	–	6	–	0
West Texas State	1	–	5	–	0	1	–	8	–	0
New Mexico A&M	0	–	4	–	0	0	–	9	–	0
$ – Conference champion

The 1954 Hardin–Simmons Cowboys football team was an American football team that represented Hardin–Simmons University in the Border Conference during the 1954 college football season. In its third and final season under head coach Murray Evans, the team compiled a 4–6 record (2–3 against conference opponents), finished in fifth place in the conference, and was outscored by a total of 204 to 153.

No Hardin-Simmons players were named to the 1954 All-Border Conference football team.

== Schedule ==
Date	Opponent	Site	Result	Attendance	Source
September 18	at Tulsa*	Skelly Stadium; Tulsa, OK	W 21–14	12,500	
September 25	at New Mexico A&M	Memorial Stadium; Las Cruces, NM	W 27–0		
October 2	Trinity (TX)*	Parramore Field; Abilene, TX	L 0–14	6,000	
October 9	at North Texas State*	Fouts Field; Denton, TX	L 7–20	8,000	
October 16	at Cincinnati*	Nippert Stadium; Cincinnati, OH	L 13–27	16,000	
October 23	vs. Oklahoma A&M*	Broncho Stadium; Odessa, TX	W 13–7	8,500	
October 30	Arizona State	Parramore Field; Abilene, TX	L 13–14		
November 6	at Texas Western	Kidd Field; El Paso, TX	L 7–20		
November 13	West Texas State	Parramore Field; Abilene, TX	W 33–27		
November 27	Texas Tech	Fair Park Stadium; Abilene, TX	L 19–61	7,000	
*Non-conference game
