= 1954 Wichita Shockers football team =

American college football season

1954 Wichita Shockers football

MVC champion
- Conference: Missouri Valley Conference
- Record: 9–1 (4–0 MVC)
- Head coach: Jack Mitchell (2nd season)
- Home stadium: Veterans Field

1954 Missouri Valley Conference football standings
	Conf.					Overall
Team	W		L		T	W		L		T
Wichita $	4	–	0	–	0	9	–	1	–	0
Houston	3	–	1	–	0	5	–	5	–	0
Oklahoma A&M	2	–	2	–	0	5	–	4	–	0
Detroit	1	–	3	–	0	2	–	7	–	0
Tulsa	0	–	4	–	0	0	–	11	–	0
$ – Conference champion

The 1954 Wichita Shockers football team was an American football team that represented the University of Wichita (now known as Wichita State University) as a member of the Missouri Valley Conference during the 1954 college football season. In its second and final season under head coach Jack Mitchell, the team compiled a 9–1 record (4–0 against MVC opponents), won the MVC championship, and outscored opponents by a total of 325 to 86. The team played its home games at Veterans Field, now known as Cessna Stadium.

== Schedule ==
Date	Time	Opponent	Site	Result	Attendance	Source
September 18		Emporia State*	Veterans Field; Wichita, KS	W 69–7	9,372	
September 25		Utah State*	Veterans Field; Wichita, KS	W 32–7	10,600–11,000	
October 1	8:00 p.m.	at Drake*	Drake Stadium; Des Moines, IA	W 54–6	1,000	
October 9		Oklahoma A&M	Veterans Field; Wichita, KS	W 22–13	18,321	
October 22		at Denver*	Hilltop Stadium; Denver, CO	L 14–27	15,076	
October 30		Houston	Veterans Field; Wichita, KS	W 9–7	16,115	
November 6		North Dakota State*	Veterans Field; Wichita, KS	W 59–0	9,707	
November 13		at No. 12 Cincinnati*	Nippert Stadium; Cincinnati, OH	W 13–0	20,000	
November 20		Detroit	Veterans Field; Wichita, KS	W 20–0	16,498	
November 25		at Tulsa	Skelly Field; Tulsa, OK	W 33–19	8,661–8,800	
*Non-conference game; Rankings from AP Poll released prior to the game; All times are in Central time
