= 1953 Texas Tech Red Raiders football team =

American college football season

1953 Texas Tech Red Raiders football
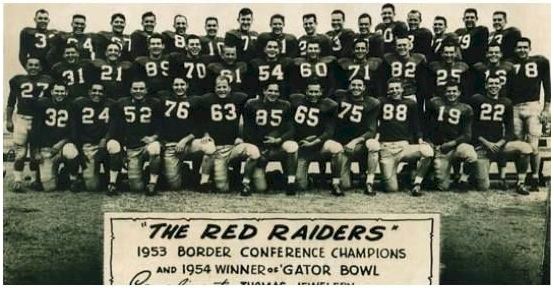

Border champion Gator Bowl champion

Gator Bowl, W 35–13 vs. Auburn
- Conference: Border Conference

Ranking
- Coaches: No. 12
- AP: No. 12
- Record: 11–1 (5–0 Border)
- Head coach: DeWitt Weaver (3rd season)
- Offensive scheme: T formation
- Base defense: 5–3
- Home stadium: Jones Stadium

1953 Border Conference football standings
	Conf.					Overall
Team	W		L		T	W		L		T
No. 12 Texas Tech $	5	–	0	–	0	11	–	1	–	0
Hardin–Simmons	4	–	1	–	0	6	–	5	–	0
Texas Western	4	–	2	–	0	8	–	2	–	0
Arizona	3	–	2	–	0	4	–	5	–	1
Arizona State	1	–	3	–	0	4	–	5	–	1
New Mexico A&M	1	–	4	–	0	2	–	7	–	0
West Texas State	0	–	6	–	0	1	–	8	–	1
$ – Conference champion; Rankings from AP Poll

The 1953 Texas Tech Red Raiders football team represented Texas Technological College—now known as Texas Tech University—as a member of the Border Conference during the 1953 college football season. Led by third-year head coach DeWitt Weaver, the Red Raiders compiled an overall record of 11–1 with a mark of 5–0 in conference play, winning the Border Conference title. Texas Tech was invited to the Gator Bowl, where they beat the Auburn Tigers.

== Schedule ==
Date	Time	Opponent	Rank	Site	Result	Attendance	Source
September 19	8:00 p.m.	West Texas State		Jones Stadium; Lubbock, TX	W 40–14	13,000–15,000	
September 26		at Texas Western		Kidd Field; El Paso, TX	W 27–6	7,000	
October 3		at Oklahoma A&M*		Lewis Field; Stillwater, OK	W 27–13	10,000	
October 10		Texas A&M*		Jones Stadium; Lubbock, TX (rivalry)	L 14–27	26,114	
October 17		Pacific (CA)*		Jones Stadium; Lubbock, TX	W 34–7	12,000	
October 24		New Mexico A&M		Jones Stadium; Lubbock, TX	W 71–0	6,000	
October 31		at Mississippi State*		Mississippi Veterans Memorial Stadium; Jackson, MS	W 27–20	16,000	
November 7		Arizona^{†}		Jones Stadium; Lubbock, TX	W 52–27	16,500	
November 14		at Tulsa*	No. 19	Skelly Stadium; Tulsa, OK	W 49–7	9,000–12,000	
November 21		at Houston*	No. 17	Rice Stadium; Houston, TX (rivalry)	W 41–21	15,000–20,000	
November 28		Hardin–Simmons	No. 14	Jones Stadium; Lubbock, TX	W 46–12	15,000	
January 1		vs. No. 17 Auburn*	No. 12	Gator Bowl Stadium; Jacksonville, FL (Gator Bowl)	W 35–13	28,641	
*Non-conference game; ^{†}Homecoming; Rankings from AP Poll released prior to the game; All times are in Central time
