= 1954 Houston Cougars football team =

American college football season

1954 Houston Cougars football
- Conference: Missouri Valley Conference
- Record: 5–5 (3–1 MVC)
- Head coach: Clyde Lee (7th season)
- Captains: Jack Patterson; George Hynes
- Home stadium: Rice Stadium

1954 Missouri Valley Conference football standings
| | Conf. | | | | | Overall |
| Team | W | | L | | T | W | | L | | T |
|---|---|---|---|---|---|---|---|---|---|---|
| Wichita $ | 4 | – | 0 | – | 0 | 9 | – | 1 | – | 0 |
| Houston | 3 | – | 1 | – | 0 | 5 | – | 5 | – | 0 |
| Oklahoma A&M | 2 | – | 2 | – | 0 | 5 | – | 4 | – | 0 |
| Detroit | 1 | – | 3 | – | 0 | 2 | – | 7 | – | 0 |
| Tulsa | 0 | – | 4 | – | 0 | 0 | – | 11 | – | 0 |
$ – Conference champion

The 1954 Houston Cougars football team was an American football team that represented the University of Houston in the Missouri Valley Conference (MVC) during the 1954 college football season. In its seventh and final season under head coach Clyde Lee, the team compiled a 5–5 record (3–1 against conference opponents) and finished in second place out of five teams in the MVC. George Patterson and George Hynes were the team captains. The team played its home games at Rice Stadium in Houston.

== Schedule ==
| Date | Opponent | Site | Result | Attendance | Source |
|---|---|---|---|---|---|
| September 18 | at Baylor* | Baylor Stadium; Waco, TX (rivalry) | L 13–53 | 22,000 | |
| October 9 | Texas A&M* | Rice Stadium; Houston, TX | W 10–7 | 42,000 | |
| October 16 | at Oklahoma A&M | Lewis Field; Stillwater, OK | W 14–7 | 24,000 | |
| October 22 | at Villanova* | Philadelphia Municipal Stadium; Philadelphia, PA | W 28–7 | 57,817 | |
| October 30 | at Wichita | Veterans Field; Wichita, KS | L 7–9 | 16,115 | |
| November 6 | Tulsa | Rice Stadium; Houston, TX | W 20–7 | 15,400 | |
| November 13 | No. 7 Ole Miss* | Rice Stadium; Houston, TX | L 0–26 | 23,000 | |
| November 20 | at Texas Tech* | Jones Stadium; Lubbock, TX (rivalry) | L 14–61 | 14,000 | |
| November 27 | Arkansas*^{†} | Rice Stadium; Houston, TX | L 0–19 | 25,000 | |
| December 4 | Detroit | Rice Stadium; Houston, TX | W 19–7 | 7,500 | |
*Non-conference game; ^{†}Homecoming; Rankings from AP Poll released prior to the game
