= 1954 Tulsa Golden Hurricane football team =

American college football season

1954 Tulsa Golden Hurricane football
- Conference: Missouri Valley Conference
- Record: 0–11 (0–4 MVC)
- Head coach: Bernie Witucki (2nd season)
- Home stadium: Skelly Stadium

1954 Missouri Valley Conference football standings
	Conf.					Overall
Team	W		L		T	W		L		T
Wichita $	4	–	0	–	0	9	–	1	–	0
Houston	3	–	1	–	0	5	–	5	–	0
Oklahoma A&M	2	–	2	–	0	5	–	4	–	0
Detroit	1	–	3	–	0	2	–	7	–	0
Tulsa	0	–	4	–	0	0	–	11	–	0
$ – Conference champion

The 1954 Tulsa Golden Hurricane football team represented the University of Tulsa during the 1954 college football season. In their second year under head coach Bernie Witucki, the Golden Hurricane compiled a 0–11 record, 0–4 against Missouri Valley Conference opponents, and finished in last place in the conference.

== Schedule ==
Date	Opponent	Site	Result	Attendance	Source
September 18	Hardin–Simmons*	Skelly Stadium; Tulsa, OK	L 14–21	12,500	
September 25	at Arkansas*	Razorback Stadium; Fayetteville, AR	L 0–41	13,000	
October 2	at Cincinnati*	Nippert Stadium; Cincinnati, OH	L 7–40	18,000	
October 9	at Alabama*	Denny Stadium; Tuscaloosa, AL	L 0–40	17,000	
October 16	Kansas State*	Skelly Stadium; Tulsa, OK	L 13–20	8,000	
October 22	at Detroit	University of Detroit Stadium; Detroit, MI	L 18–28	21,350	
October 30	Oklahoma A&M^{†}	Skelly Stadium; Tulsa, OK (rivalry)	L 0–12	11,000	
November 6	at Houston	Rice Stadium; Houston, TX	L 7–20	14,500	
November 13	at Texas Tech*	Jones Stadium; Lubbock, TX	L 13–55	18,000	
November 20	Wyoming*	Skelly Stadium; Tulsa, OK	L 27–28	7,000	
November 25	Wichita	Skelly Stadium; Tulsa, OK	L 19–33	8,661–8,800	
*Non-conference game; ^{†}Homecoming
