= 1954 Pacific Tigers football team =

American college football season

1954 Pacific Tigers football
- Conference: Independent
- Record: 4–5
- Head coach: Jack Myers (2nd season)
- Home stadium: Pacific Memorial Stadium

1954 Western college football independents records
	Conf.			Overall
Team	W	L	T	W		L		T
San Jose State		–		7	–	3	–	0
Pacific (CA)		–		4	–	5	–	0
Hawaii		–		4	–	4	–	0
La Verne		–		2	–	6	–	0
Cal Poly San Dimas		–		1	–	8	–	0

The 1954 Pacific Tigers football team represented the College of the Pacific (COP)—now known as the University of the Pacific (UOP)—as an independent during the 1954 college football season. In their second season under head coach Jack Myers, the Tigers compiled a record of 4–5 and were outscored by opponents 118 to 99. The team played home games at Pacific Memorial Stadium in Stockton, California.

== Schedule ==
Date	Opponent	Site	Result	Attendance	Source
September 17	Stanford	Pacific Memorial Stadium; Stockton, CA	L 12–13	28,000	
September 25	at Washington State	Memorial Stadium; Spokane, WA	L 0–18	12,000	
October 2	at Indiana	Memorial Stadium; Bloomington, IN	L 6–34	18,000–23,648	
October 9	Idaho	Pacific Memorial Stadium; Stockton, CA	W 13–0	9,500	
October 16	at Colorado A&M	Colorado Field; Fort Collins, CO	W 15–7	5,558	
October 23	Texas Tech^{†}	Pacific Memorial Stadium; Stockton, CA	W 20–7	14,117–14,171	
October 30	at Cincinnati	Nippert Stadium; Cincinnati, OH	L 7–13	18,000	
November 6	San Jose State	Pacific Memorial Stadium; Stockton, CA (Victory Bell)	W 13–7	18,000	
November 13	Marquette	Pacific Memorial Stadium; Stockton, CA	L 13–19	10,000	
^{†}Homecoming

== Team players in the NFL ==
No College of the Pacific players were selected in the 1955 NFL draft.

The following finished their college career in 1954, were not drafted, but played in the NFL.

Player	Position	First NFL team
Fred Miller	Tackle	1955 Washington Redskins
