= Jack Myers (American football) =

American football player, coach, and administrator (1924–2020)

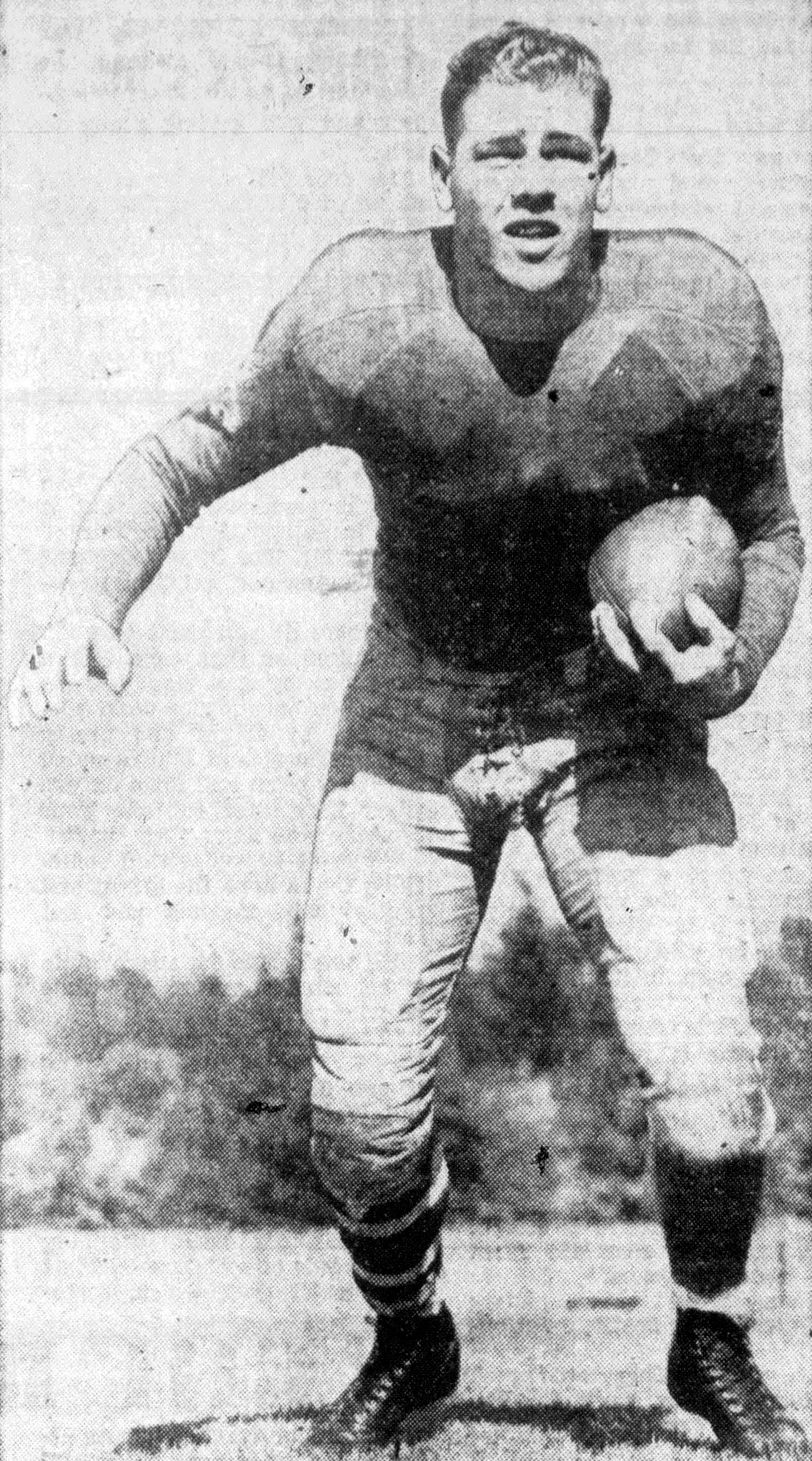
- Myers, circa 1944

No. 32, 31
- Positions: Fullback, quarterback, linebacker

Personal information
- Born: October 8, 1924; St. Louis, Missouri, U.S.
- Died: December 24, 2020 (aged 96); Menlo Park, California, U.S.
- Listed height: 6 ft 2 in (1.88 m)
- Listed weight: 200 lb (91 kg)

Career information
- High school: Ventura (Ventura, California)
- College: UCLA
- NFL draft: 1948: 5th round, 33rd overall pick

Career history

Playing
- Philadelphia Eagles (1948–1950); Los Angeles Rams (1952)

Coaching
- Pacific (CA) (1951) Assistant; Pacific (CA) (1953-1960) Head coach

Operations
- Pacific (CA) (1956-1961)

Awards and highlights
- 2× NFL champion (1948, 1949); Second-team All-PCC (1944)

Career NFL statistics
- Rushing yards: 541
- Rushing average: 4.3
- Receptions: 28
- Receiving yards: 360
- Total touchdowns: 3
- Stats at Pro Football Reference

Head coaching record
- Regular season: 39–33–5 (.539)

John Melvin "Moose" Myers (October 8, 1924 – December 24, 2020) was an American professional football player, coach, and college athletics administrator. He played college football at the University of California, Los Angeles (UCLA) and professionally in National Football League (NFL) with the Philadelphia Eagles and Los Angeles Rams. Myers served as the head football coach at the University of the Pacific in Stockton, California from 1953 to 1960, compiling a record of 39–33–5. He was also the athletic director at Pacific from 1956 to 1961.

== Biography ==
Myers attended high school in Ventura, California, and served in the United States Navy as an ensign during World War II. Myers first came to Pacific in 1951 for one season as the backfield coach for the Tigers before returning to the NFL as a player in 1952.

Myers died on December 24, 2020, at the age of 96. At the time of his death, he was the last surviving member of both the 1948 and 1949 Philadelphia Eagles championship teams.

== Head coaching record ==
Moose Myers in 1955

Year	Team	Overall	Conference	Standing	Bowl/playoffs
Pacific Tigers (Independent) (1953–1960)
1953	Pacific	4–4–2			
1954	Pacific	4–5			
1955	Pacific	5–4			
1956	Pacific	6–3–1			
1957	Pacific	5–3–2			
1958	Pacific	6–4			
1959	Pacific	5–4			
1960	Pacific	4–6			
Pacific:		39–33–5			
Total:		39–33–5			
