= 1954 Texas Tech Red Raiders football team =

American college football season

1954 Texas Tech Red Raiders football

Border champion
- Conference: Border Conference
- Record: 7–2–1 (4–0 Border)
- Head coach: DeWitt Weaver (4th season)
- Offensive scheme: T formation
- Base defense: 5–3
- Home stadium: Jones Stadium

1954 Border Conference football standings
	Conf.					Overall
Team	W		L		T	W		L		T
Texas Tech $	4	–	0	–	0	7	–	2	–	1
Arizona State	3	–	1	–	0	5	–	5	–	0
Texas Western	4	–	2	–	0	8	–	3	–	0
Arizona	3	–	2	–	0	7	–	3	–	0
Hardin–Simmons	2	–	3	–	0	4	–	6	–	0
West Texas State	1	–	5	–	0	1	–	8	–	0
New Mexico A&M	0	–	4	–	0	0	–	9	–	0
$ – Conference champion

The 1954 Texas Tech Red Raiders football team represented Texas Technological College—now known as Texas Tech University—as a member of the Border Conference during the 1954 college football season. Led by fourth-year head coach DeWitt Weaver, the Red Raiders compiled an overall record of 7–2–1 with a mark of 4–0 in conference play, winning the Border Conference title for the second consecutive season.

== Schedule ==
Date	Opponent	Rank	Site	Result	Attendance	Source
September 18	at Texas A&M*	No. 19	Kyle Field; College Station, TX (rivalry)	W 41–9	16,500	
September 25	West Texas State	No. 14	Jones Stadium; Lubbock, TX	W 33–7	14,000	
October 2	Oklahoma A&M*	No. 17	Jones Stadium; Lubbock, TX	T 13–13	24,500	
October 9	Texas Western		Jones Stadium; Lubbock, TX	W 55–28	15,000	
October 16	at LSU*	No. 20	Tiger Stadium; Baton Rouge, LA	L 13–20	25,000	
October 23	at Pacific (CA)*		Pacific Memorial Stadium; Stockton, CA	L 7–20	14,117–14,171	
November 6	at Arizona		Arizona Stadium; Tucson, AZ	W 28–14	23,000	
November 13	Tulsa*^{†}		Jones Stadium; Lubbock, TX	W 55–13	18,000	
November 20	Houston*		Jones Stadium; Lubbock, TX (rivalry)	W 61–14	14,000	
November 27	at Hardin–Simmons		Fair Park Stadium; Abilene, TX	W 61–19	7,000	
*Non-conference game; ^{†}Homecoming; Rankings from AP Poll released prior to the game
