= 1950 North Texas State Eagles football team =

American college football season

1950 North Texas State Eagles football

GCC co-champion
- Conference: Gulf Coast Conference
- Record: 7–2–1 (1–0–1 GCC)
- Head coach: Odus Mitchell (5th season)
- Home stadium: Eagle Field

1950 Gulf Coast Conference football standings
	Conf.					Overall
Team	W		L		T	W		L		T
North Texas State +	1	–	0	–	1	7	–	2	–	1
Midwestern (TX) +	1	–	0	–	1	4	–	5	–	1
Trinity (TX)	0	–	2	–	0	5	–	4	–	1
+ – Conference co-champions

The 1950 North Texas State Eagles football team was an American football team that represented North Texas State College (now known as the University of North Texas) during the 1950 college football season as a member of the Gulf Coast Conference. In their fifth year under head coach Odus Mitchell, the team compiled a 7–2–1 record.

== Schedule ==
Date	Time	Opponent	Site	Result	Attendance	Source
September 16		at No. 13 Kentucky*	McLean Stadium; Lexington, KY	L 0–25	24,000	
September 23		at East Texas State*	Memorial Stadium; Commerce, TX	W 42–20	12,000	
September 30		at Arkansas*	Razorback Stadium; Fayetteville, AR	L 6–50	15,000	
October 6		Southwestern Oklahoma State*	Eagle Field; Denton, TX	W 76–6		
October 13	8:00 p.m.	at Midwestern (TX)	Coyote Stadium; Wichita Falls, TX	T 7–7	9,000	
October 20		at Chattanooga*	Chamberlain Field; Chattanooga, TN	W 19–14	5,000	
November 4		Trinity (TX)	Eagle Field; Denton, TX	W 35–6		
November 11		at Houston*	Public School Stadium; Houston, TX	W 16–13	8,000	
November 18		Nevada*^{†}	Eagle Field; Denton, TX	W 34–21		
November 24		at Fresno State*	Ratcliffe Stadium; Fresno, CA	W 31–12	9,000	
*Non-conference game; ^{†}Homecoming; Rankings from AP Poll released prior to the game; All times are in Central time
