= 1954 Hawaii Rainbows football team =

American college football season

1954 Hawaii Rainbows football
- Conference: Independent
- Record: 4–4
- Head coach: Hank Vasconcellos (3rd season)
- Home stadium: Honolulu Stadium

1954 Western college football independents records
	Conf.			Overall
Team	W	L	T	W		L		T
San Jose State		–		7	–	3	–	0
Pacific (CA)		–		4	–	5	–	0
Hawaii		–		4	–	4	–	0
La Verne		–		2	–	6	–	0
Cal Poly San Dimas		–		1	–	8	–	0

The 1954 Hawaii Rainbows football team represented the University of Hawaiʻi at Mānoa as an independent during the 1954 college football season. In their third season under head coach Hank Vasconcellos, the Rainbows compiled a 4–4 record.

== Schedule ==
Date	Opponent	Site	Result	Attendance	Source
September 3	Prep All-Stars	Honolulu Stadium; Honolulu, Territory of Hawaii	W 14–13	20,000	
September 18	at Arizona State	Goodwin Stadium; Tempe, AZ	L 14–28	12,000	
September 25	at Fresno State	Ratcliffe Stadium; Fresno, CA (rivalry)	W 25–20	10,000	
October 6	Naval Station Pearl Harbor	Honolulu Stadium; Honolulu, Territory of Hawaii	W 28–27	4,500	
October 13	Hawaii Rams	Honolulu Stadium; Honolulu, Territory of Hawaii	L 0–13	6,000	
October 24	Pacific Army	Honolulu Stadium; Honolulu, Territory of Hawaii	L 7–14		
November 14	Hawaii Marines	Honolulu Stadium; Honolulu, Territory of Hawaii	W 45–13		
November 26	Nebraska^{†}	Honolulu Stadium; Honolulu, Territory of Hawaii	L 0–50	20,000	
^{†}Homecoming
