= 1954 New Mexico A&M Aggies football team =

American college football season

1954 New Mexico A&M Aggies football
- Conference: Border Conference
- Record: 0–9 (0–4 Border)
- Head coach: James Patton (2nd season)
- Home stadium: Memorial Stadium

1954 Border Conference football standings
	Conf.					Overall
Team	W		L		T	W		L		T
Texas Tech $	4	–	0	–	0	7	–	2	–	1
Arizona State	3	–	1	–	0	5	–	5	–	0
Texas Western	4	–	2	–	0	8	–	3	–	0
Arizona	3	–	2	–	0	7	–	3	–	0
Hardin–Simmons	2	–	3	–	0	4	–	6	–	0
West Texas State	1	–	5	–	0	1	–	8	–	0
New Mexico A&M	0	–	4	–	0	0	–	9	–	0
$ – Conference champion

The 1954 New Mexico A&M Aggies football team was an American football team that represented New Mexico College of Agriculture and Mechanical Arts (now known as New Mexico State University) as a member of the Border Conference during the 1954 college football season. In their second year under head coach James Patton, the Aggies compiled a 0–9 record (0–4 against conference opponents), finished last in the conference, and were outscored by a total of 306 to 87. The team played home games at Memorial Stadium in Las Cruces, New Mexico.

== Schedule ==
Date	Opponent	Site	Result	Attendance	Source
September 18	at Arizona	Arizona Stadium; Tucson, AZ	L 0–58	15,000	
September 25	Hardin–Simmons	Memorial Stadium; Las Cruces, NM	L 0–27		
October 2	vs. Sul Ross*	Rotary Field; Pecos, TX	L 18–42	3,000	
October 9	Howard Payne*	Memorial Stadium; Las Cruces, NM	L 7–34	3,000	
October 16	at West Texas State	Buffalo Stadium; Canyon, TX	L 7–41		
October 23	San Diego Marines*	Memorial Stadium; Las Cruces, NM	L 7–33		
October 30	Texas Western	Memorial Stadium; Las Cruces, NM (rivalry)	L 7–12		
November 13	Southwestern Oklahoma State*	Memorial Stadium; Las Cruces, NM	L 14–20		
November 20	at New Mexico*	Zimmerman Field; Albuquerque, NM (rivalry)	L 27–39	5,500	
*Non-conference game
