= 1940 La Crosse State Indians football team =

American college football season

1940 La Crosse State Indians football

WSTCC Northern Division champion
- Conference: Wisconsin State Teachers College Conference
- Northern Division
- Record: 6–0 (4–0 WSTCC)
- Head coach: Clyde B. Smith (3rd season)
- Home stadium: Memorial Field

1940 Wisconsin State Teachers College Conference football standings
	Conf.					Overall
Team	W		L		T	W		L		T
Northern Division
La Crosse State x	4	–	0	–	0	6	–	0	–	0
Superior State	3	–	1	–	0	6	–	1	–	0
River Falls State	2	–	2	–	0	4	–	3	–	0
Stout Institute	0	–	3	–	1	1	–	5	–	1
Eau Claire State	0	–	3	–	1	0	–	5	–	3
Southern Division
Whitewater State x	4	–	0	–	0	5	–	2	–	0
Stevens Point State	3	–	1	–	0	5	–	2	–	1
Milwaukee State	2	–	2	–	0	4	–	4	–	0
Platteville State	1	–	3	–	0	1	–	4	–	0
Oshkosh State	0	–	4	–	0	1	–	5	–	0
x – Division champion/co-champions

The 1940 La Crosse State Indians football team was an American football team that represented La Crosse State Teachers College (now known as the University of Wisconsin–La Crosse) as a member of the Wisconsin State Teachers College Conference (WSTCC) during the 1940 college football season. In their third season under head coach Clyde B. Smith, the Indians compiled a perfect 6–0 record (4–0 against WSTCC opponents), shut out five of six opponents, outscored all opponents by a total of 123 to 9, and won the WSTCC Northern Division championship.

The team played its home games at Memorial Field in La Crosse, Wisconsin.

== Schedule ==
Date	Opponent	Site	Result	Source
October 4	Milwaukee State*	Memorial Field; La Crosse, WI	W 25–0	
October 12	at Stout Institute	Menomonie, WI	W 19–0	
October 19	Superior State^{†}	Memorial Field; La Crosse, WI	W 20–9	
October 26	at Whitewater State*	Whitewater, WI	W 7–0	
November 2	River Falls State	Memorial Field; La Crosse, WI	W 33–0	
November 8	at Eau Claire State	Carson Park Stadium; Eau Claire, WI	W 19–0	
*Non-conference game; ^{†}Homecoming
