= 1954 Detroit Titans football team =

American college football season

1954 Detroit Titans football
- Conference: Missouri Valley Conference
- Record: 2–7 (1–3 MVC)
- Head coach: Wally Fromhart (1st season)
- Home stadium: University of Detroit Stadium

1954 Missouri Valley Conference football standings
	Conf.					Overall
Team	W		L		T	W		L		T
Wichita $	4	–	0	–	0	9	–	1	–	0
Houston	3	–	1	–	0	5	–	5	–	0
Oklahoma A&M	2	–	2	–	0	5	–	4	–	0
Detroit	1	–	3	–	0	2	–	7	–	0
Tulsa	0	–	4	–	0	0	–	11	–	0
$ – Conference champion

The 1954 Detroit Titans football team represented the University of Detroit in the Missouri Valley Conference (MVC) during the 1954 college football season. In their first season under head coach Wally Fromhart, the Titans compiled a 2–7 record (1–3 against conference opponents), finished fourth in the MVC, and were outscored by their opponents by a combined total of 158 to 107.

== Schedule ==
Date	Opponent	Site	Result	Attendance	Source
September 18	Cincinnati*	University of Detroit Stadium; Detroit, MI	L 13–21		
September 25	Boston College*	University of Detroit Stadium; Detroit, MI	L 7–12	13,750	
October 1	Quantico Marines*	University of Detroit Stadium; Detroit, MI	L 0–20	8,350	
October 15	Villanova*	University of Detroit Stadium; Detroit, MI	W 20–0	4,650	
October 22	Tulsa	University of Detroit Stadium; Detroit, MI	W 28–18	21,350	
October 29	Marquette*	University of Detroit Stadium; Detroit, MI	L 13–14	8,275	
November 6	at Oklahoma A&M	Lewis Field; Stillwater, OK	L 19–34	12,000	
November 20	at Wichita	Veterans Field; Wichita, KS	L 0–20	16,498	
December 4	at Houston	Rice Stadium; Houston, TX	L 7–19	7,500	
*Non-conference game
