= 1953 Arizona Wildcats football team =

American college football season

1953 Arizona Wildcats football
- Conference: Border Conference
- Record: 4–5–1 (3–2 Border)
- Head coach: Warren Woodson (2nd season)
- Captain: Buddy Lewis
- Home stadium: Arizona Stadium

1953 Border Conference football standings
	Conf.					Overall
Team	W		L		T	W		L		T
No. 12 Texas Tech $	5	–	0	–	0	11	–	1	–	0
Hardin–Simmons	4	–	1	–	0	6	–	5	–	0
Texas Western	4	–	2	–	0	8	–	2	–	0
Arizona	3	–	2	–	0	4	–	5	–	1
Arizona State	1	–	3	–	0	4	–	5	–	1
New Mexico A&M	1	–	4	–	0	2	–	7	–	0
West Texas State	0	–	6	–	0	1	–	8	–	1
$ – Conference champion; Rankings from AP Poll

The 1953 Arizona Wildcats football team represented the University of Arizona as a member of the Border Conference during the 1953 college football season. Led by second-year head coach Warren Woodson, the Wildcats compiled an overall record of 4–5–1 with a mark of 3–2 in conference play, placing fourth in the Border Conference. The team played home games at Arizona Stadium in Tucson, Arizona.

== Schedule ==
Date	Opponent	Site	Result	Attendance	Source
September 19	Utah*	Arizona Stadium; Tucson, AZ	L 7–28	22,500	
September 26	at Colorado*	Folsom Field; Boulder, CO	L 14–20	24,500	
October 3	New Mexico A&M	Arizona Stadium; Tucson, AZ	W 46–7	14,000	
October 10	New Mexico*	Arizona Stadium; Tucson, AZ (rivalry)	W 20–0	16,000	
October 17	Marquette*	Arizona Stadium; Tucson, AZ	L 0–14	20,000	
October 31	West Texas State	Arizona Stadium; Tucson, AZ	W 39–6	18,000	
November 7	at Texas Tech	Jones Stadium; Lubbock, TX	L 27–52	16,500	
November 14	Texas Western	Arizona Stadium; Tucson, AZ	L 20–28		
November 21	Kansas State*	Arizona Stadium; Tucson, AZ	T 26–26	19,000	
November 28	at Arizona State	Goodwin Stadium; Tempe, AZ (rivalry)	W 35–0	16,000	
*Non-conference game

The game versus Arizona State was first game on television.

== Awards ==
- All-Border (First Team): B Kenny Cardella, T Buddy Lewis
