= 1953 Wichita Shockers football team =

American college football season

1953 Wichita Shockers football
- Conference: Missouri Valley Conference
- Record: 4–4–1 (1–2 MVC)
- Head coach: Jack Mitchell (1st season)
- Home stadium: Veterans Field

1953 Missouri Valley Conference football standings
	Conf.					Overall
Team	W		L		T	W		L		T
Oklahoma A&M +	3	–	1	–	0	7	–	3	–	0
Detroit +	3	–	1	–	0	5	–	4	–	0
Wichita	1	–	2	–	0	4	–	4	–	1
Houston	1	–	2	–	0	4	–	4	–	1
Tulsa	1	–	3	–	0	3	–	7	–	0
+ – Conference co-champions

The 1953 Wichita Shockers football team, sometimes known as the Wheatshockers, was an American football team that represented Wichita University (now known as Wichita State University) as a member of the Missouri Valley Conference during the 1953 college football season. In its first season under head coach Jack Mitchell, the team compiled a 4–4–1 record (1–2 against conference opponents), tied for third place out of five teams in the MVC, and outscored opponents by a total of 172 to 110. The team played its home games at Veterans Field, now known as Cessna Stadium.

== Schedule ==
Date	Time	Opponent	Site	Result	Attendance	Source
September 19		at Utah State*	Romney Stadium; Logan, UT	L 7–14	5,000	
September 26		Tulsa	Veterans Field; Wichita, KS	W 19–10	10,100–10,500	
October 3		Bradley*	Veterans Field; Wichita, KS	W 55–0	8,600	
October 10		at Oklahoma A&M	Lewis Field; Stillwater, OK	L 7–14	11,000	
October 17	8:00 p.m.	Drake*	Veterans Field; Wichita, KS	W 27–0	8,592	
October 24		at Kansas State*	Memorial Stadium; Manhattan, KS	L 0–21	15,000	
November 7		Denver*	Veterans Field; Wichita, KS	T 12–12	6,775	
November 14		South Dakota State*	Veterans Field; Wichita, KS	W 39–13		
November 26		Detroit	Veterans Field; Wichita, KS	L 6–26	9,585–9,985	
*Non-conference game; All times are in Central time
