= 1954 Cal Poly San Dimas Broncos football team =

American college football season

1954 Cal Poly San Dimas Broncos football
- Conference: Independent
- Record: 1–8
- Head coach: Staley Pitts (2nd season)

1954 Western college football independents records
	Conf.			Overall
Team	W	L	T	W		L		T
San Jose State		–		7	–	3	–	0
Pacific (CA)		–		4	–	5	–	0
Hawaii		–		4	–	4	–	0
La Verne		–		2	–	6	–	0
Cal Poly San Dimas		–		1	–	8	–	0

The 1954 Cal Poly San Dimas Broncos football team represented the Cal Poly Kellogg-Voorhis Unit—now known as California State Polytechnic University, Pomona—as an independent during the 1954 college football season. Led by second-year head coach Staley Pitts, Cal Poly San Dimas compiled a record of 1–8. The team was outscored by its opponents 203 to 77 for the season.

== Schedule ==
Date	Opponent	Site	Result
September 25	at Reedley	Reedley, CA	L 13–39
October 2	at Citrus	Glendora, CA	L 6–9
October 8	at Pierce	Woodland Hills, CA	L 0–12
October 14	at Glendale (CA)	Glendale, CA	L 0–57
October 23	at New Mexico Western	Silver City, NM	L 13–52
October 29	California Baptist	Bonita High School; La Verne, CA	W 33–0
November 6	Palomar	Bonita High School; La Verne, CA	L 6–7
November 11	La Verne	Bonita High School; La Verne, CA	L 0–21
November 20	Oceanside-Carlsbad	Bonita High School; La Verne, CA	L 6–7

(Note: The footnote PDF published by the Cal Poly Pomona athletic department, and available on their website, shows the game against La Verne as a 21-0 victory. That was actually a loss by that score. The loss has been validated via an article summarizing the game published in the Oakland Tribune on November 12, 1954.)
