= James Patton (American football coach) =

American football player and coach

Biographical details
- Born: c. 1918

Playing career
- 1935–1937: Oklahoma A&M
- 1942: Great Lakes Navy
- 1945: Fort Pierce
- Positions: guard, quarterback

Coaching career (HC unless noted)
- 1948–1949: Cameron (assistant)
- 1950–1952: New Mexico A&M (assistant)
- 1953–1954: New Mexico A&M

Head coaching record
- Overall: 2–16 (college)

James M. Patton (born c. 1918) was an American football player and coach.

Patton played college football as a guard and quarterback at Oklahoma A&M for three years before graduating in 1938.

After graduating, he served as the athletic director and football and basketball coach at Marietta, Oklahoma. One year later, he became the football and basketball coach at Sasakwa, Oklahoma. Two years later, he became an assistant football coach at Guthrie, Oklahoma.

In the spring of 1942, Patton enlisted in the United States Navy. He played on the 1942 Great Lakes Navy Bluejackets football team. In 1943, he served as an instructor in the Navy's V-12 program at Washburn University. He was promoted to the rank of ensign in 1944 and played for the Fort Pierce Amphibs in 1945.

After being discharged from the Navy in 1946, Patton returned to coaching at Davis High School Davis, Oklahoma, for two years. He was then an assistant football coach at Cameron Junior College—now known as Cameron University—in Lawton, Oklahoma, for two years in 1948 and 1949. His 1948 team won the state junior college championship.

In 1950, he was hired as an assistant football coach at New Mexico College of Agriculture and Mechanic Arts (now known as New Mexico State University). He served in that capacity for three seasons from 1950 to 1952. In August 1953, he was named the acting head coach of the New Mexico A&M football team. He served as head coach for the 1953 and 1954 seasons. His 1954 team compiled a 0–9 record, the worst in school history. He resigned in December 1954. His overall record as head coach was 2–16.

== Head coaching record ==
=== College ===
Year	Team	Overall	Conference	Standing	Bowl/playoffs
New Mexico A&M Aggies (Border Conference) (1953–1954)
1953	New Mexico A&M	2–7	1–4	6th	
1954	New Mexico A&M	0–9	0–4	7th	
New Mexico A&M:		2–16	1–8		
Total:		2–16			
