= 1939 Kilgore Rangers football team =

American college football season

1939 Kilgore Rangers football

TJCC champion
- Conference: Texas Junior College Conference
- Record: 10–0 (9–0 TJCC)
- Head coach: Clyde Lee (5th season)
- Home stadium: Ranger Stadium

1939 Texas Junior College Conference football standings
	Conf.					Overall
Team	W		L		T	W		L		T
Kilgore $	9	–	0	–	0	10	–	0	–	0
Paris	7	–	1	–	0	?	–	?	–	?
Schreiner	4	–	1	–	0	?	–	?	–	?
San Angelo	5	–	2	–	0	?	–	?	–	?
Lon Morris	6	–	3	–	0	?	–	?	–	?
John Tarleton	5	–	3	–	0	6	–	4	–	0
Hillsboro	5	–	4	–	0	?	–	?	–	?
North Texas Aggies	4	–	4	–	0	6	–	4	–	0
Decatur Baptist	2	–	7	–	0	?	–	?	–	?
Lamar	1	–	4	–	0	2	–	7	–	0
Texas Lutheran	1	–	4	–	0	?	–	?	–	?
Westminster (TX)	1	–	4	–	0	?	–	?	–	?
Clifton	0	–	3	–	0	?	–	?	–	?
Weatherford	1	–	7	–	0	?	–	?	–	?
$ – Conference champion

The 1939 Kilgore Rangers football team represented Kilgore College—as a member of the Texas Junior College Conference (TJCC) during the 1939 college football season. Led by fifth-year head coach Clyde Lee, the Rangers compiled a perfect overall record of 10–0 with mark of 9–0 in conference play, winning the TJCC title. Kilgore shut out seven opponents and allowed only 21 points on the season. The team played home games at Ranger Stadium in Kilgore, Texas.

== Schedule ==
Date	Time	Opponent	Site	Result	Attendance	Source
September 21		Decatur Baptist	Ranger Stadium; Kilgore, TX	W 33–0 (forfeit)	2,000	
September 28	8:00 p.m.	Murray Aggies*	Ranger Stadium; Kilgore, TX	W 26–0		
October 7		at John Tarleton	Hays Field; Stephenville, TX	W 21–13		
October 12	8:00 p.m.	Texas Lutheran	Ranger Stadium; Kilgore, TX	W 40–0		
October 19	8:00 p.m.	Weatherford	Ranger Stadium; Kilgore, TX	W 25–0		
October 26	8:00 p.m.	Lamar	Ranger Stadium; Kilgore, TX	W 20–0		
November 2	8:00 p.m.	North Texas Aggies	Ranger Stadium; Kilgore, TX	W 23–0		
November 9		at Lon Morris	Jacksonville, TX	W 7–6		
November 16	7:45 p.m.	at Paris	Wise Field; Paris, TX	W 6–2	4,000	
November 23	7:45 p.m.	Schreiner^{†}	Ranger Stadium; Kilgore, TX	W 13–0	5,000	
*Non-conference game; ^{†}Homecoming; All times are in Central time
