= Texas Junior College Conference =

Junior college athletic conference in Texas

The Texas Junior College Conference (TJCC), also known as the Texas Junior College Athletic Association (TJCAA) and the Texas Junior College Athletic College (TJCAC), was a junior college athletic conference with member schools located in Texas. The conference sponsored football though the 1963 season, after which its members joined the Texas Junior College Football Federation (TJCFF)—now known as the Southwest Junior College Football Conference (SWJCFC)—for football only.

== Yearly football standings ==
1939 Texas Junior College Conference football standings
	Conf.					Overall
Team	W		L		T	W		L		T
Kilgore $	9	–	0	–	0	10	–	0	–	0
Paris	7	–	1	–	0	?	–	?	–	?
Schreiner	4	–	1	–	0	?	–	?	–	?
San Angelo	5	–	2	–	0	?	–	?	–	?
Lon Morris	6	–	3	–	0	?	–	?	–	?
John Tarleton	5	–	3	–	0	6	–	4	–	0
Hillsboro	5	–	4	–	0	?	–	?	–	?
North Texas Aggies	4	–	4	–	0	6	–	4	–	0
Decatur Baptist	2	–	7	–	0	?	–	?	–	?
Lamar	1	–	4	–	0	2	–	7	–	0
Texas Lutheran	1	–	4	–	0	?	–	?	–	?
Westminster (TX)	1	–	4	–	0	?	–	?	–	?
Clifton	0	–	3	–	0	?	–	?	–	?
Weatherford	1	–	7	–	0	?	–	?	–	?
$ – Conference champion

1941 Texas Junior College Conference football standings
	Conf.					Overall
Team	W		L		T	W		L		T
Kilgore $	6	–	0	–	0	8	–	1	–	0
North Texas Aggies	6	–	2	–	0	7	–	2	–	0
John Tarleton	4	–	2	–	1	5	–	2	–	2
Schreiner	3	–	2	–	1	4	–	3	–	2
Decatur Baptist	3	–	2	–	2	?	–	?	–	?
Lamar	2	–	2	–	0	4	–	4	–	0
San Angelo	2	–	3	–	2	3	–	5	–	2
Paris	1	–	3	–	1	3	–	4	–	1
Weatherford	1	–	5	–	0	?	–	?	–	?
Hillsboro	0	–	7	–	1	?	–	?	–	?
$ – Conference champion

1942 Texas Junior College Conference football standings
	Conf.					Overall
Team	W		L		T	W		L		T
Paris $	3	–	0	–	0	7	–	2	–	0
Kilgore	2	–	1	–	0	6	–	2	–	0
North Texas Aggies	1	–	2	–	1	2	–	3	–	1
Lamar	1	–	2	–	1	2	–	6	–	1
Schreiner	0	–	2	–	0	5	–	3	–	0
$ – Conference champion

1950 Texas Junior College Conference football standings
	Conf.					Overall
Team	W		L		T	W		L		T
Panola $	6	–	0	–	0	9	–	2	–	0
Odessa	4	–	1	–	0	8	–	2	–	0
Henderson County	3	–	1	–	0	7	–	3	–	0
Decatur Baptist	2	–	1	–	0	3	–	5	–	0
Navarro	2	–	2	–	0	5	–	5	–	0
Weatherford	2	–	2	–	0	5	–	4	–	1
Allen Academy	0	–	3	–	1	1	–	7	–	1
Blinn	0	–	3	–	1	0	–	8	–	1
Cisco	0	–	3	–	0	1	–	7	–	0
Ranger	0	–	3	–	0	2	–	6	–	1
$ – Conference champion

1951 Texas Junior College Conference football standings
	Conf.					Overall
Team	W		L		T	W		L		T
Navarro $	5	–	0	–	0	7	–	3	–	0
Blinn	4	–	1	–	0	4	–	6	–	0
Allen Academy	3	–	2	–	0	4	–	5	–	0
Henderson County	2	–	3	–	0	4	–	6	–	0
Decatur Baptist	1	–	4	–	0	1	–	9	–	0
Cisco	0	–	5	–	0	0	–	9	–	0
$ – Conference champion

1952 Texas Junior College Conference football standings
	Conf.					Overall
Team	W		L		T	W		L		T
Navarro +	5	–	1	–	0	8	–	2	–	0
Henderson County +	5	–	1	–	0	6	–	5	–	0
Southwest Texas	3	–	2	–	1	5	–	4	–	1
Blinn	3	–	3	–	0	3	–	7	–	0
Allen Academy	1	–	4	–	1	2	–	6	–	1
Cisco	0	–	3	–	3	0	–	6	–	3
Decatur Baptist	1	–	4	–	1	1	–	8	–	1
+ – Conference co-champions

1953 Texas Junior College Conference football standings
	Conf.					Overall
Team	W		L		T	W		L		T
Navarro +	3	–	1	–	0	5	–	5	–	1
Henderson County +	3	–	1	–	0	3	–	6	–	0
Blinn	2	–	1	–	1	?	–	?	–	?
Allen Academy	1	–	2	–	1	?	–	?	–	?
Cisco	0	–	4	–	0	?	–	?	–	?
+ – Conference co-champions

1954 Texas Junior College Conference football standings
	Conf.					Overall
Team	W		L		T	W		L		T
Paris $	5	–	0	–	0	7	–	3	–	0
Navarro	4	–	1	–	0	6	–	4	–	0
Henderson County	3	–	2	–	0	4	–	6	–	0
Blinn	2	–	3	–	0	2	–	8	–	0
Cisco	0	–	4	–	1	0	–	7	–	1
Allen Academy	0	–	4	–	1	0	–	8	–	1
$ – Conference champion

1955 Texas Junior College Conference football standings
	Conf.					Overall
Team	W		L		T	W		L		T
Texarkana +	5	–	1	–	0	6	–	4	–	0
Paris +	5	–	1	–	0	5	–	5	–	0
Navarro	3	–	3	–	0	5	–	4	–	0
Blinn	3	–	3	–	0	3	–	5	–	0
Henderson County	2	–	3	–	1	2	–	7	–	1
Allen Academy	1	–	4	–	1	1	–	7	–	1
Cisco	1	–	5	–	0	1	–	9	–	0
+ – Conference co-champions

1956 Texas Junior College Conference football standings
	Conf.					Overall
Team	W		L		T	W		L		T
Allen Academy $	4	–	0	–	1	6	–	2	–	1
Paris	4	–	1	–	0	6	–	3	–	1
Navarro	3	–	2	–	0	5	–	4	–	0
Cisco	2	–	3	–	0	4	–	5	–	0
Texarkana	1	–	3	–	1	1	–	6	–	1
Blinn	0	–	5	–	0	0	–	7	–	0
$ – Conference champion

1957 Texas Junior College Conference football standings
	Conf.					Overall
Team	W		L		T	W		L		T
Texarkana $	4	–	0	–	0	9	–	1	–	0
Paris	4	–	1	–	0	6	–	4	–	0
Blinn	2	–	2	–	0	3	–	4	–	0
Navarro	2	–	3	–	0	4	–	6	–	0
Henderson County	1	–	4	–	0	3	–	6	–	0
Cisco	0	–	3	–	0	2	–	8	–	0
$ – Conference champion

1958 Texas Junior College Conference football standings
	Conf.					Overall
Team	W		L		T	W		L		T
Henderson County +	3	–	1	–	0	6	–	5	–	0
Navarro +	3	–	1	–	0	5	–	5	–	0
Ranger	2	–	1	–	1	4	–	5	–	1
Blinn	1	–	2	–	1	?	–	?	–	?
Cisco	0	–	4	–	0	?	–	?	–	?
+ – Conference co-champions

1959 Texas Junior College Conference football standings
	Conf.					Overall
Team	W		L		T	W		L		T
Navarro +	3	–	0	–	1	7	–	2	–	1
Henderson County +	3	–	0	–	1	6	–	4	–	1
Ranger	2	–	2	–	0	7	–	4	–	0
Blinn	1	–	3	–	0	3	–	6	–	0
Cisco	0	–	4	–	0	0	–	9	–	0
+ – Conference co-champions

1960 Texas Junior College Conference football standings
	Conf.					Overall
Team	W		L		T	W		L		T
Ranger $	3	–	0	–	0	4	–	5	–	1
Navarro	2	–	1	–	0	4	–	6	–	0
Cisco	1	–	2	–	0	3	–	7	–	0
Blinn	0	–	3	–	0	0	–	9	–	0
$ – Conference champion

1961 Texas Junior College Conference football standings
	Conf.					Overall
Team	W		L		T	W		L		T
Cisco +	5	–	1	–	0	6	–	4	–	0
Navarro +	5	–	1	–	0	6	–	4	–	0
Blinn	1	–	5	–	0	1	–	7	–	1
Ranger	1	–	5	–	0	1	–	8	–	0
Wharton *	0	–	0	–	0	11	–	1	–	0
+ – Conference co-champions; * – Wharton had a record of 8–0 against conference opponents but was ineligible for the conference title.

1962 Texas Junior College Conference football standings
	Conf.					Overall
Team	W		L		T	W		L		T
Navarro +	7	–	1	–	0	10	–	1	–	0
Wharton +	7	–	1	–	0	7	–	3	–	0
Blinn	4	–	4	–	0	5	–	4	–	0
Cisco	2	–	6	–	0	3	–	7	–	0
Ranger	0	–	8	–	0	1	–	9	–	0
+ – Conference co-champions

1963 Texas Junior College Conference football standings
	Conf.					Overall
Team	W		L		T	W		L		T
Wharton $	7	–	1	–	0	9	–	1	–	0
Blinn	6	–	2	–	0	7	–	2	–	0
Navarro	4	–	4	–	0	5	–	5	–	0
Cisco	3	–	5	–	0	5	–	5	–	0
Ranger	0	–	8	–	0	1	–	9	–	0
$ – Conference champion
