= Wisconsin State University Conference =

Defunct NCAA Division III athletic conference

The Wisconsin State University Conference (WSUC) was an American intercollegiate college athletic conference that was formed in July 1913 as the Wisconsin State Normal Conference. All member institutions were located in the State of Wisconsin. The WSUC sponsored competitions and championships in basketball, football, and other sports.

Charter members included La Crosse, Wisconsin State College of Milwaukee (1913-1956), Oshkosh, Platteville, River Falls, Stevens Point, Superior, and Whitewater.

Other members included Eau Claire (joined 1917) and Stout (1914).

All of these schools were (and remain) State institutions, most of them had been founded as normal schools in the late 19th century. They were renamed as state teachers colleges, state colleges, and state universities before becoming campuses of the University of Wisconsin System when the latter merged with the Wisconsin State Universities in 1971.

Wisconsin State College–Milwaukee became University of Wisconsin–Milwaukee in 1956, and left the conference.

In July 1997, the nine members of the WSUC merged with the Wisconsin Women’s Intercollegiate Athletic Conference to form the Wisconsin Intercollegiate Athletic Conference.
