= Allen Academy =

Location
- 3201 Boonville Road; Bryan, Brazos County, Texas 77802; United States; 30.670675°N 96.315776°W

Information
- Type: Independent, Coeducational, and College Preparatory School
- Established: 1886
- Headmaster: Keith Currivean
- Assistant Headmaster: Benjamin Jordan
- Faculty: 73
- Teaching staff: 55
- Grades: JK3-12
- Enrollment: 340
- Campus: Suburban
- Colors: Blue and Gold
- Mascot: Ramblers (1886-1974); Rams (1975-present)
- Accreditation: ISAS, SACS/CASI
- athletic conference: TAPPS
- Website: www.allenacademy.org

Allen Academy is an independent co-educational day school located in Bryan, Texas that was founded in 1886 by John H. and Rivers O. Allen. The 40-acre (16 ha) campus is located seven miles (11 km) northeast of Texas A&M University and enrolls about 340 students from throughout the Brazos Valley. The school is the oldest private school in the state of Texas and is a non-denominational pre-kindergarten through grade 12 school. It is a member of both the National Association of Independent Schools (NAIS) and the Texas Association of Private and Parochial Schools (TAPPS), and is accredited by the Southern Association of Colleges and Schools (SACS). Allen is also the only NAIS member school within a 75-mile (121 km) radius. In 1916, military training was introduced into the school. In 1986, girls were allowed into the school for the first time. In 2022, a new headmaster was appointed by the board: Seraphim Daenkart

== About the school ==
Allen Academy is made up of four separate "divisions":

- Junior Kindergarten: JK3 (3-year-olds) and JK4 (4-year-olds)
- Lower School: Kindergarten - Grade 5
- Middle School: Grades 6-8
- Upper School: Grades 9-12

Texas State Representative Kyle Kacal of College Station is an Allen Academy trustee.
