= Freddie Meyers =

American gridiron football player (1932–2015)

Profile
- Positions: Quarterback, Halfback, End

Personal information
- Born: May 6, 1932; Enid, Oklahoma
- Died: January 31, 2015 (aged 82); Enid, Oklahoma
- Listed height: 6 ft 1 in (1.85 m)
- Listed weight: 220 lb (100 kg)

Career information
- College: Army; Oklahoma A&M

Career history
- 1958–1959: Edmonton Eskimos

Frederic D. Meyers (May 6, 1932 – January 31, 2015) was an American professional football player who played for the Edmonton Eskimos.

== Early life ==
Meyers was born on May 6, 1932, in Enid, Oklahoma. He lettered in football, basketball, track and baseball at Enid High School.

== College ==
Meyers started his college football career at the United States Military Academy. He became Army's starting quarterback as a freshman after most of the football team was expelled due to a cheating scandal. He injured his knee against Northwestern and did not return until Army's game against The Citadel on November 10. An all-around athlete, Meyers was also a guard on the school's basketball team and played first base for the Army baseball team.

Meyers was moved to halfback for the 1952 season, but an injury in spring practice forced him to miss the entire season. In 1953, he failed a mathematics course and left the school. He transferred to Oklahoma A&M for the 1954 season, but was injured in the season opener and missed the rest of the year. He had another injury-riddled season in 1955 and was suspended indefinitely for disciplinary reasons on December 20.

In 1957, Meyers was a member of the football team at Fort Sill.

== Professional career ==
In 1958, Meyers signed with the Edmonton Eskimos of the Canadian Football League. After failing to win the starting quarterback job, Meyers was converted to halfback. He returned to the team in 1959 and was moved to the end position. He caught 15 passes for 348 yards and two touchdowns. He signed with the Montreal Alouettes in 1960, but was released during the preseason.

== Post-playing career ==
Meyers graduated from Michigan State University in 1959 with a degree in commercial arts. He worked in film and television production in Los Angeles. He moved back to Enid, Oklahoma in the 1990s to take care of his parents. He died on January 31, 2015.
