= Gulf Coast Conference =

- Conference: NCAA
- Founded: 1949
- Folded: 1957
- Commissioner: D. L. Ligon
- Division: None (1949–1956); College Division (1956–1957)
- No. of teams: 3–5
- Headquarters: Denton, Texas
- Region: South Central United States

Locations
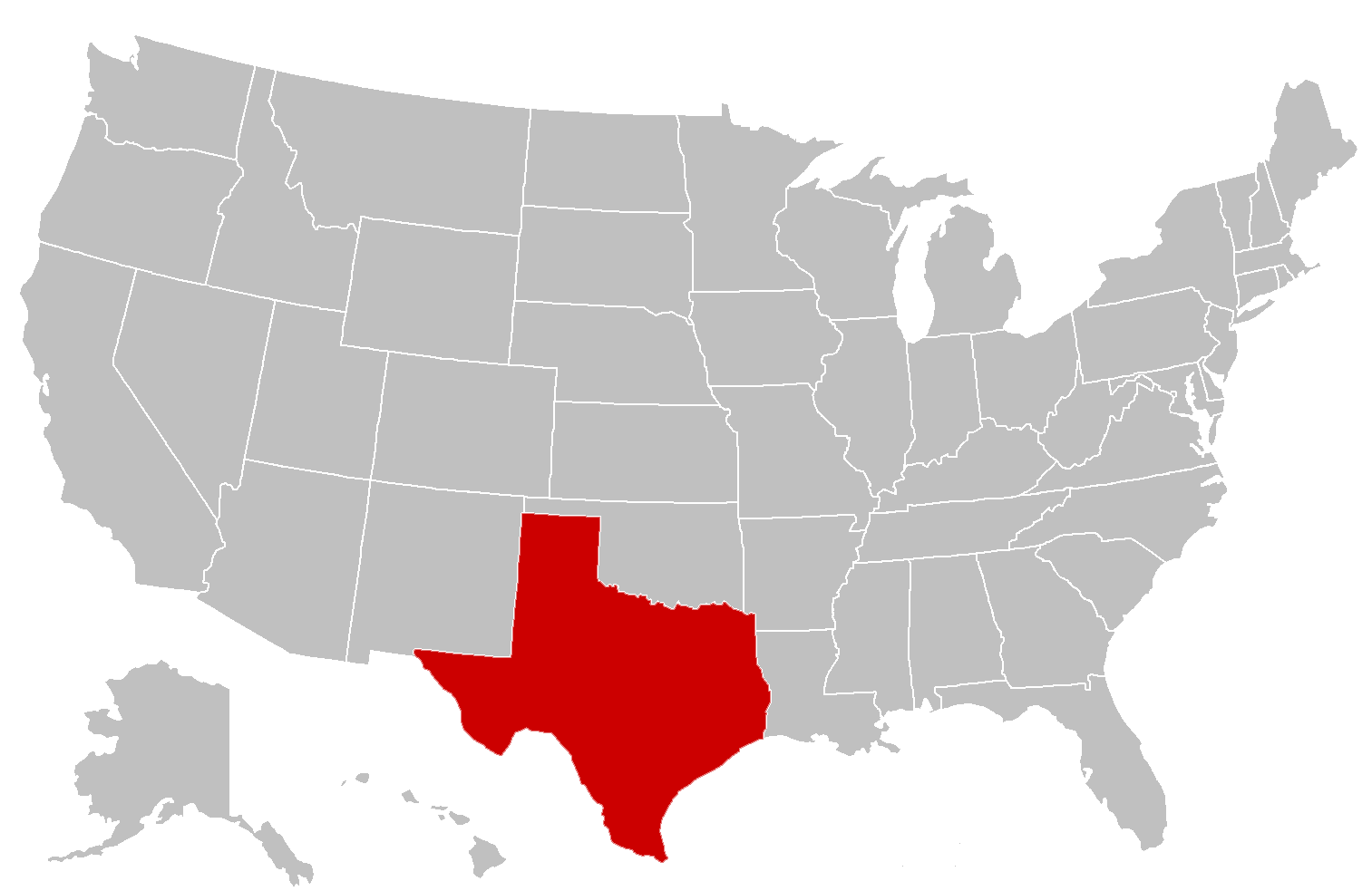

The Gulf Coast Conference (GCC) was a short-lived NCAA college athletic conference composed of universities in the U.S. state of Texas from 1949 until 1957. The charter members of the conference were the University of Houston, Midwestern University (now Midwestern State University), North Texas State College (now the University of North Texas), and Trinity University. The Gulf Coast Conference spawned from then members of the Lone Star Conference, and its president was D.L. Ligon. In 1956, when the NCAA created divisions, all members of the conference at the time were classified as part of the NCAA's College Division, which was later subdivided into Division II and Division III in 1973. Charter member Houston had already left for the Missouri Valley Conference by the end of 1950, and was classified as a University Division school, which later became known as Division I.

== Member schools ==
=== Final members ===
Institution	Location (Note: All cities were located within the State of Texas.)	Founded	Affiliation	Enrollment	Nickname	Joined (Note: Represents the calendar year when fall sports competition begins.)	Left (Note: Represents the calendar year when spring sports competition ends.)	Current conference
Abilene Christian University (Note: Joined the GCC as a basketball-only full member in its first season before other sports later competed during its tenure.)	Abilene	1906	Churches of Christ	5,334	Wildcats	1954	1957	Western (WAC) (Note: Currently an NCAA Division I non-football athletic conference.) (United (UAC) in 2026)
Hardin–Simmons University (Note: Joined the GCC as a basketball-only full member during its tenure.)	Abilene	1891	Baptist	2,333	Cowboys & Cowgirls	1956	1957	American Southwest (ASC) (Note: Currently an NCAA Division III athletic conference.)
Midwestern State University	Wichita Falls	1922	Public	5,784	Mustangs	1949	1957	Lone Star (LSC) (Note: Currently an NCAA Division II athletic conference.)
University of North Texas	Denton	1890	Public	42,372	Eagles (Note: Its nickname is currently known as the Mean Green since 1966.)	1949	1957	The American (AAC) (Note: Currently an NCAA Division I Football Bowl Subdivision (FBS) athletic conference.)
Trinity University	San Antonio	1869	Nonsectarian	2,487	Tigers	1949	1957	Southern Collegiate (SCAC)

=== Other members ===
Institution	Location (Note: All cities were located within the State of Texas.)	Founded	Affiliation	Enrollment	Nickname	Joined (Note: Represents the calendar year when fall sports competition begins.)	Left (Note: Represents the calendar year when spring sports competition ends.)	Current conference
University of Houston	Houston	1927	Public	47,090	Cougars	1949	1950	Big 12 (Note: Currently an NCAA Division I Football Bowl Subdivision (FBS) athletic conference.)

== Conference championships ==
=== Baseball ===
Year (Note: Year of spring season.)	Conference champion	Conference record
1950	Houston	4–0

=== Football ===
Year (Note: Year of fall season.)	Conference champion(s)	Conference record
1949	Midwestern (TX)	3–0
1950	Midwestern (TX); North Texas State	2–0–1
1951	North Texas State	2–0
1952	North Texas State	2–0
1953	Trinity (TX)	2–0
1954	Trinity (TX)	2–0
1955	Abilene Christian; North Texas State	2–0
1956	North Texas State; Trinity (TX)	2–0–1

=== Men's basketball ===
Year	Conference champion(s)	Conference record
1949–50	Houston	6–0
1950–51	North Texas State	3–1
1951–52	North Texas State	4–2
1952–53	North Texas State	7–1
1953–54	North Texas State	7–1
1954–55	Midwestern (TX)	8–0
1955–56	Midwestern (TX)	4–0
1956–57	Abilene Christian; Midwestern (TX)	4–0
