= Midwestern State Mustangs =

Sports team for Midwestern State University

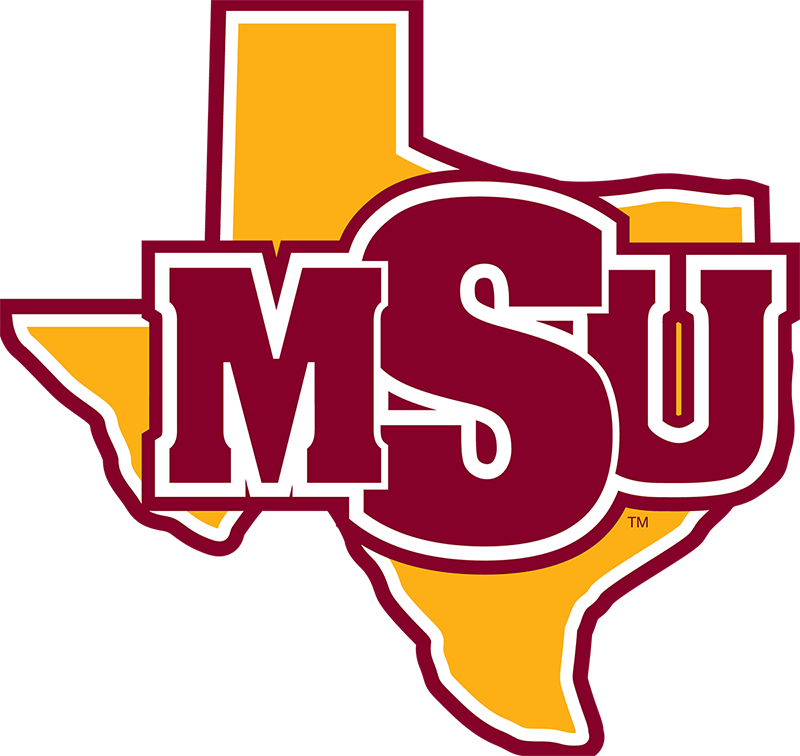
- University: Midwestern State University
- Conference: LSC (primary)
- NCAA: Division II
- Athletic director: Kyle Williams
- Location: Wichita Falls, Texas
- Varsity teams: 13 (5 men's, 8 women's)
- Football stadium: Memorial Stadium
- Basketball arena: D.L. Ligon Coliseum
- Softball stadium: Mustangs Park
- Soccer stadium: Stang Park
- Tennis venue: MSU Tennis Center
- Mascot: Maverick T. Mustang
- Nickname: Mustangs
- Marching band: Golden Thunder Marching Band
- Colors: Maroon and gold
- Website: msumustangs.com
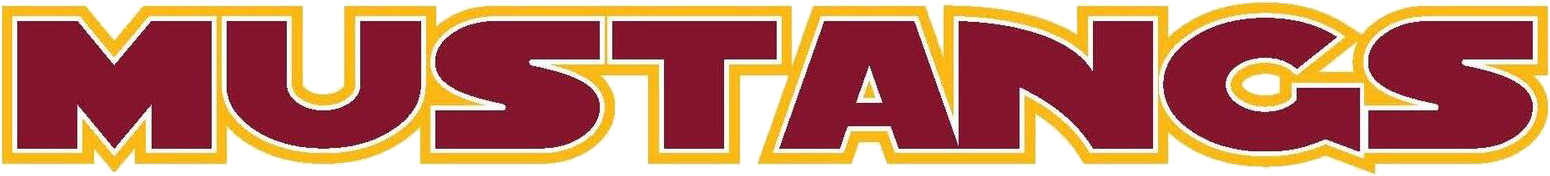

Individual and relay NCAA champions
- 2

The Midwestern State Mustangs (also MSU Texas Mustangs) are the athletic teams that represent Midwestern State University, located in Wichita Falls, Texas, in NCAA Division II intercollegiate sports. The Mustangs compete as members of the Lone Star Conference for 13 varsity sports.

In 2017, Charlie Carr retired, replaced by athletic director, Kyle Williams.

== Sponsored sports ==
| Men's sports | Women's sports |
|---|---|
| Basketball | Basketball |
| Football | Cross country |
| Golf | Golf |
| Soccer | Soccer |
| Tennis | Softball |
| | Tennis |
| | Track and field |
| | Volleyball |

== National championships ==
=== Team ===
| Sport | Association | Division | Year | Opponent/Runner-up | Score/Points |
|---|---|---|---|---|---|
| Soccer, men's | NCAA | Division II | 2025 | Rollins | 2–0 |

=== Individual ===
In 2015, Brenna Moore won the NCAA Division II individual women's golf championship.

== Gallery ==
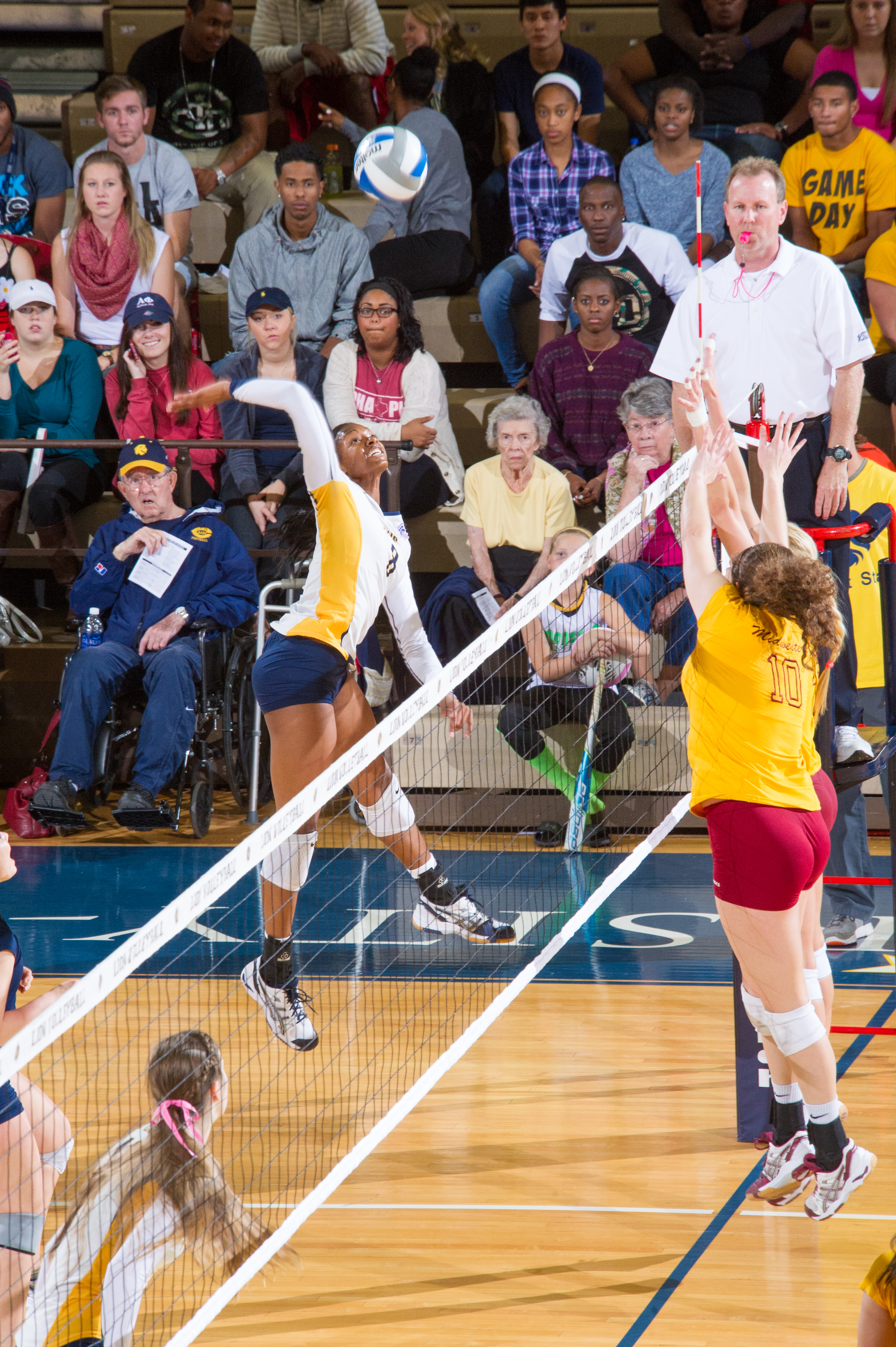
Women's volleyball team v Texas A&M Commerce, 2013

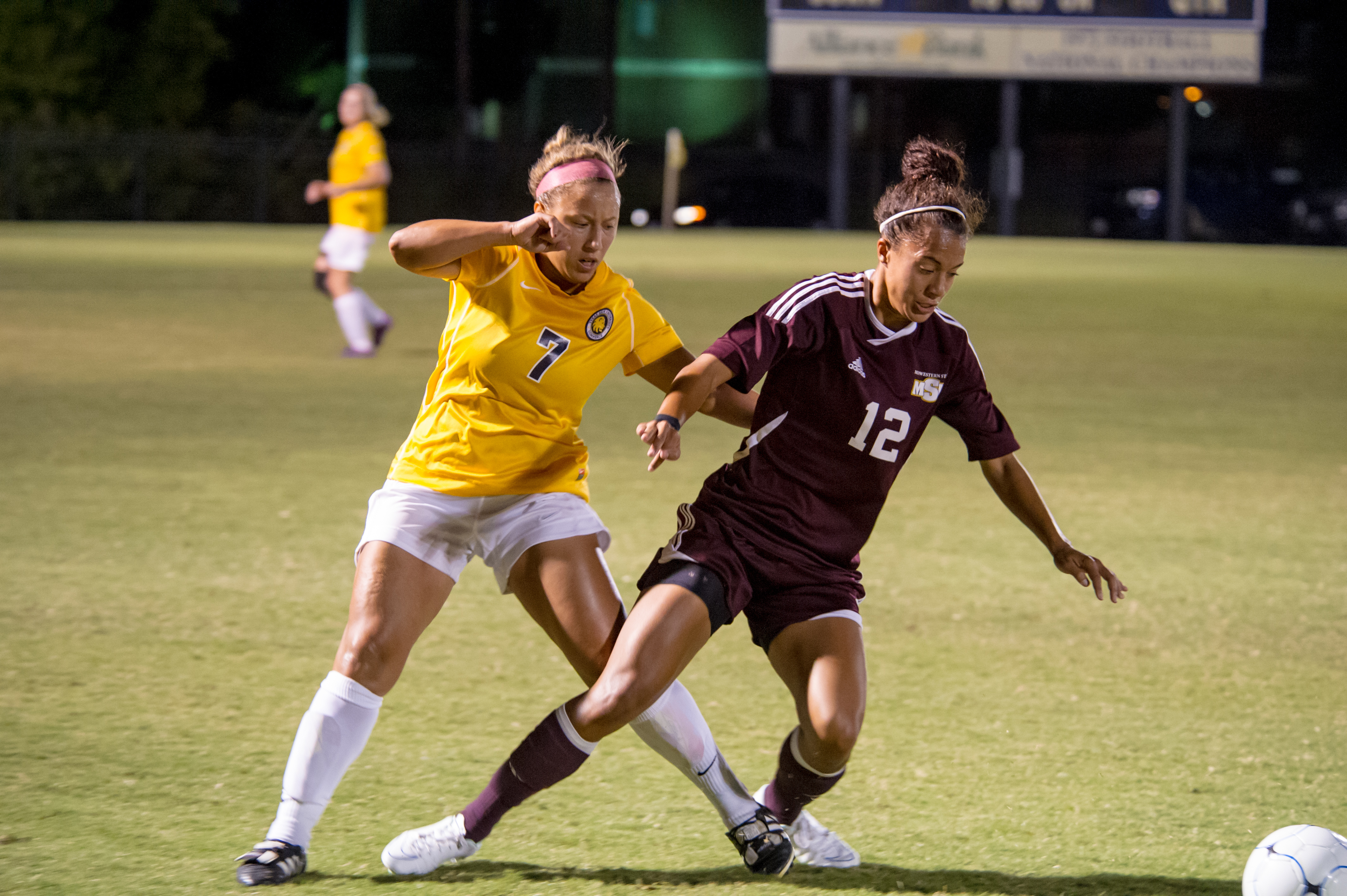
Women's soccer v Texas A&M, 2014

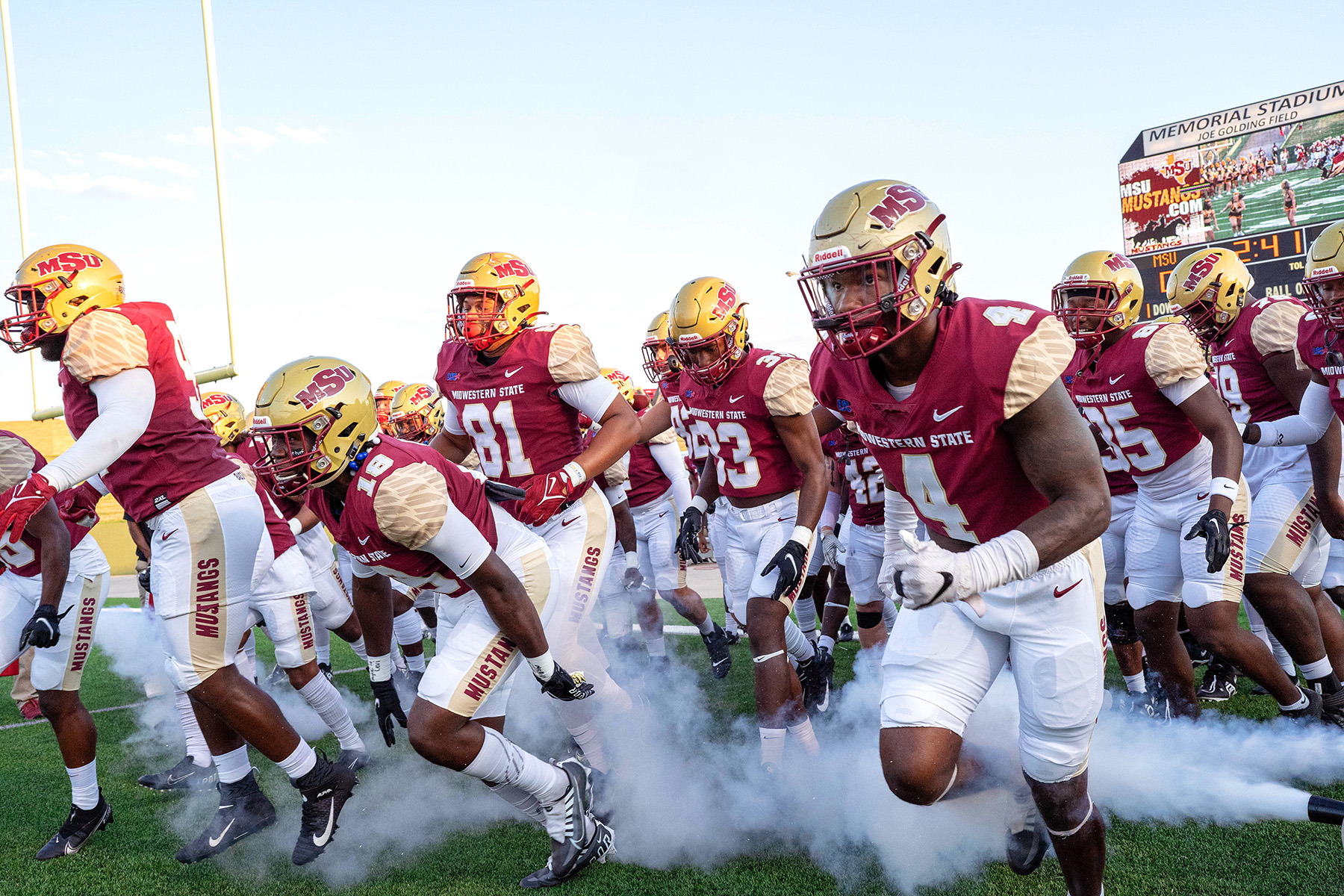
MSU football players, 2022
