= 1954 Big Ten Conference football season =

- Sport: American football
- Teams: 10
- Top draft pick: Alan Ameche
- Champion: Ohio State
- Runners-up: Wisconsin, Michigan
- Season MVP: Alan Ameche

Football seasons
- ← 1953 1955 →

1954 Big Ten Conference football standings
	Conf.					Overall
Team	W		L		T	W		L		T
No. 1 Ohio State $	7	–	0	–	0	10	–	0	–	0
No. 9 Wisconsin	5	–	2	–	0	7	–	2	–	0
No. 15 Michigan	5	–	2	–	0	6	–	3	–	0
Minnesota	4	–	2	–	0	7	–	2	–	0
Iowa	4	–	3	–	0	5	–	4	–	0
Purdue	3	–	3	–	0	5	–	3	–	1
Indiana	2	–	4	–	0	3	–	6	–	0
Michigan State	1	–	5	–	0	3	–	6	–	0
Northwestern	1	–	5	–	0	2	–	7	–	0
Illinois	0	–	6	–	0	1	–	8	–	0
$ – Conference champion; Rankings from AP Poll

The 1954 Big Ten Conference football season was the 59th season of college football played by the member schools of the Big Ten Conference (also known as the Western Conference) and was a part of the 1954 college football season.

The 1954 Ohio State Buckeyes football team, under head coach Woody Hayes, won the conference football championship, compiled a 10–0, was ranked No. 1 in the final AP Poll, and defeated USC in the 1955 Rose Bowl. Halfback Howard Cassady was selected as the team's most valuable player and was a consensus first-team All-American.

The 1954 Wisconsin Badgers football team, under head coach Ivy Williamson, compiled a 7–2 record and was ranked No. 9 in the final AP Poll. Fullback Alan Ameche won the 1954 Heisman Trophy as the best player in college football and the Chicago Tribune Silver Football as the most valuable player in the Big Ten Conference. Ameche broke Ollie Matson's career rushing record, finishing his tenure at Wisconsin with 3,212 rushing yards.

Purdue quarterback Len Dawson led the conference with 1,464 passing yards.

== Season overview ==
=== Results and team statistics ===
Conf. Rank	Team	Head coach	AP final	AP high	Overall record	Conf. record	PPG	PAG	MVP
1	Ohio State	Woody Hayes	#1	#1	10–0	7–0	**24.9**	**7.5**	Howard Cassady
2 (tie)	Wisconsin	Ivy Williamson	#9	#2	7–2	5–2	22.2	10.9	**Alan Ameche**
2 (tie)	Michigan	Bennie Oosterbaan	#15	#11	6–3	5–2	15.4	9.7	Fred Baer
4	Minnesota	Murray Warmath	NR	#8	7–2	4–2	21.7	14.1	Bob McNamara
5	Iowa	Forest Evashevski	NR	#3	5–4	4–3	21.3	15.7	Warren Lawson
6	Purdue	Stu Holcomb	NR	#5	5–3–1	3–3	18.3	14.9	Tom Bettis
7	Indiana	Bernie Crimmins	NR	NR	3–6	2–4	12.2	15.9	Florian Helinski
8 (tie)	Michigan State	Duffy Daugherty	NR	#6	3–6	1–5	19.7	16.6	John Matsock
8 (tie)	Northwestern	Bob Voigts	NR	NR	2-7	1-5	11.2	15.8	Ziggie Niepokoj
10	Illinois	Ray Eliot	NR	#5	1–8	0–6	11.4	20.0	Jack Chamblin

Key
AP final = Team's rank in the final AP Poll of the 1954 season
AP high = Team's highest rank in the AP Poll throughout the 1954 season
PPG = Average of points scored per game; conference leader's average displayed in bold
PAG = Average of points allowed per game; conference leader's average displayed in bold
MVP = Most valuable player as voted by players on each team as part of the voting process to determine the winner of the Chicago Tribune Silver Football trophy; trophy winner in bold

=== Preseason ===
Two Big Ten teams changed head coaches between the 1953 and 1954 seasons:

- In December 1953, Wes Fesler resigned as Minnesota's head coach to accept a position as a partner, vice president and sports director at Minneapolis radio station WDGY. In January 1954, Murray Warmath signed a four-year contract as Minnesota's new head football coach.
- In January 1954, Michigan State's head coach Biggie Munn was elevated to a new position as the school's athletic director. Longtime line coach Duffy Daugherty became the new head football coach.

=== Regular season ===
==== September 25 ====
On September 25, 1954, the Big Ten football teams played two conference games and six non-conference games. The non-conference games resulted in five wins and one loss.

- Ohio State 28, Indiana 0.
- Wisconsin 52, Marquette 14.
- Michigan 14, Washington 0.
- Minnesota 19, Nebraska 7.
- Iowa 14, Michigan State 10.
- Purdue 31, Missouri 0.
- Northwestern 27, Iowa State 14.
- Penn State 14, Illinois 12.

==== October 2 ====
On October 2, 1954, the Big Ten football teams played one conference game and eight non-conference games. The non-conference games resulted in five wins and three losses, giving the Big Ten a 10–4 record in non-conference games played to that date.

- Ohio State 21, California 13.
- Wisconsin 6, Michigan State 0.
- Army 26, Michigan 7.
- Minnesota 46, Pittsburgh 7.
- Iowa 48, Montana 6.
- Purdue 27, Notre Dame 14.
- Indiana 34, Pacific 6.
- USC 12, Northwestern 7.
- Stanford 12, Illinois 2.

==== October 9 ====
On October 9, 1954, the Big Ten football teams played four conference games and two non-conference games. The non-conference games resulted in two wins, giving the Big Ten a 12–4 record in non-conference games played to that date.

- Ohio State 40, Illinois 7.
- Wisconsin 13, Rice 7.
- Michigan 14, Iowa 13.
- Minnesota 26, Northwestern 7.
- Purdue 13, Duke 13.
- Michigan State 21, Indiana 14.

==== October 16 ====
On October 16, 1954, the Big Ten football teams played four conference games and two non-conference games. The non-conference games resulted in two losses, giving the Big Ten a 12–6 record in non-conference games played to that date.

- Ohio State 20, Iowa 14.
- Wisconsin 20, Purdue 6.
- Michigan 7, Northwestern 0.
- Minnesota 19, Illinois 6.
- Missouri 20, Indiana 14.
- Notre Dame 20, Michigan State 19.

==== October 23 ====
On October 23, 1954, the Big Ten football teams played four conference games and two non-conference games. The non-conference games resulted in one win and one loss, giving the Big Ten a 13–7 record in non-conference games played to that date.

- Ohio State 31, Wisconsin 14.
- Michigan 34, Minnesota 0.
- Iowa 27, Indiana 14.
- Purdue 27, Michigan State 13.
- Pittsburgh 14, Northwestern 7.
- Illinois 34, Syracuse 6.

==== October 30 ====
On October 30, 1954, the Big Ten football teams played against each other in five conference games.

- Ohio State 14, Northwestern 7.
- Iowa 13, Wisconsin 7.
- Indiana 13, Michigan 9.
- Minnesota 19, Michigan State 13.
- Purdue 28, Illinois 14.

==== November 6 ====
On November 6, 1954, the Big Ten football teams played three conference games and four non-conference games. The non-conference games resulted in three wins and one loss, giving the Big Ten a 16–8 record in non-conference games played to that date.

- Ohio State 26, Pittsburgh 0.
- Wisconsin 34, Northwestern 13.
- Michigan 14, Illinois 7.
- Minnesota 44, Oregon State 6.
- Iowa 25, Purdue 14.
- Miami (OH) 6, Indiana 0.
- Michigan State 54, Washington State 6.

==== November 13 ====
On November 13, 1954, the Big Ten football teams played against each other in five conference games.

- Ohio State 28, Purdue 6.
- Wisconsin 27, Illinois 14.
- Michigan 33, Michigan State 7.
- Minnesota 22, Iowa 20.
- Indiana 14, Northwestern 13.

==== November 20 ====
On November 20, 1954, the Big Ten football teams played four conference games and two non-conference games. The non-conference games resulted in one win and one loss, giving the Big Ten a 17–9 record in non-conference games played to that date.

- Ohio State 21, Michigan 7.
- Wisconsin 27, Minnesota 0.
- Notre Dame 34, Iowa 18.
- Purdue 13, Indiana 7.
- Michigan State 40, Marquette 10.
- Northwestern 20, Illinois 7.

=== Bowl games ===
On January 1, 1955, Ohio State (ranked No. 1 in the AP Poll) defeated USC (ranked No. 17 in the AP Poll) by a 20–7 score before a crowd of 89,191 in Pasadena, California. UCLA (ranked No. 2) was not permitted to play in the Rose Bowl due to the Pacific Coast Conference's no-repeat rule. Ohio State quarterback Dave Leggett was selected as the game's most valuable player.

=== Post-season developments ===
On February 3, 1955, Bob Voigts resigned as Northwestern's head football coach. Voigts had come under fire from alumni after Northwestern won only one conference game in two seasons. Less than a week later, Lou Saban was announced as Voigts' replacement. Saban had been an assistant coach at Northwestern in 1954. He had played for Indiana in 1941 and 1942 and for the Cleveland Browns from 1946 to 1949.

== Awards and honors ==
=== All-Big Ten honors ===
The following players were picked by the Associated Press (AP) and/or the sports editors (Ed) as first-team players on the 1954 All-Big Ten Conference football team.

Position	Name	Team	Selectors
End	Dean Dugger	Ohio State	AP, Ed
End	Ron Kramer	Michigan	AP, Ed
Tackle	Art Walker	Michigan	AP, Ed
Tackle	Dick Hilinski	Ohio State	AP
Tackle	Randy Schrecengost	Michigan State	Ed
Guard	Cal Jones	Iowa	AP, Ed
Guard	Tom Bettis	Purdue	AP, Ed
Center	Gary Messner	Wisconsin	AP, Ed
Quarterback	Len Dawson	Purdue	AP, Ed
Halfback	Howard Cassady	Ohio State	AP, Ed
Halfback	Bob McNamara	Minnesota	AP
Halfback	Bobby Watkins	Ohio State	Ed
Fullback	Alan Ameche	Wisconsin	AP, Ed

=== All-American honors ===
At the end of the 1954 season, Big Ten players secured three of 11 consensus first-team picks for the 1954 College Football All-America Team. The Big Ten's consensus All-Americans were:

Position	Name	Team	Selectors
Fullback	Alan Ameche	Wisconsin	AAB, AFCA, AP, FWAA, INS, NEA, TSN, UP, CP, WCFF
Halfback	Howard Cassady	Ohio State	AAB, AFCA, AP, FWAA, INS, NEA, TSN, UP, CP, WCFF
Guard	Cal Jones	Iowa	AAB, FWAA, NEA, TSN, UP, CP, WCFF

Other Big Ten players who were named first-team All-Americans by at least one selector were:

Position	Name	Team	Selectors
End	Dean Dugger	Ohio State	FWAA
End	Ron Kramer	Michigan	CP
Tackle	Art Walker	Michigan	AAB, FWAA
Guard	Tom Bettis	Purdue	FWAA, INS, CP
Halfback	Bob McNamara	Minnesota	FWAA

=== Other awards ===
Wisconsin running back Alan Ameche won the 1954 Heisman Trophy.

== 1955 NFL draft ==
The following Big Ten players were among the first 100 picks in the 1955 NFL draft:

Name	Position	Team	Round	Overall pick
Fullback	Alan Ameche	Wisconsin	1	3
Guard	Tom Bettis	Purdue	1	5
End	Jim Temp	Wisconsin	2	17
Back	Bobby Watkins	Ohio State	2	23
Tackle	John Hall	Iowa	3	35
End	Dean Dugger	Ohio State	4	46
Guard	Hank Bullough	Michigan State	5	53
Guard	Norm Amundsen	Wisconsin	6	65
End	Ron Locklin	Wisconsin	6	68
Back	Leroy Bolden	Michigan State	6	73
Back	Dave Leggett	Ohio State	7	74
Back	Bert Zagers	Michigan State	7	84
Center	Johnny Allen	Purdue	8	87
