= 1954 Purdue Boilermakers football team =

American college football season

1954 Purdue Boilermakers football
- Conference: Big Ten Conference
- Record: 5–3–1 (3–3 Big Ten)
- Head coach: Stu Holcomb (8th season)
- MVP: Tom Bettis
- Captains: Tom Bettis; John Kerr
- Home stadium: Ross–Ade Stadium

1954 Big Ten Conference football standings
	Conf.					Overall
Team	W		L		T	W		L		T
No. 1 Ohio State $	7	–	0	–	0	10	–	0	–	0
No. 9 Wisconsin	5	–	2	–	0	7	–	2	–	0
No. 15 Michigan	5	–	2	–	0	6	–	3	–	0
Minnesota	4	–	2	–	0	7	–	2	–	0
Iowa	4	–	3	–	0	5	–	4	–	0
Purdue	3	–	3	–	0	5	–	3	–	1
Indiana	2	–	4	–	0	3	–	6	–	0
Michigan State	1	–	5	–	0	3	–	6	–	0
Northwestern	1	–	5	–	0	2	–	7	–	0
Illinois	0	–	6	–	0	1	–	8	–	0
$ – Conference champion; Rankings from AP Poll

The 1954 Purdue Boilermakers football team was an American football team that represented Purdue University during the 1954 Big Ten Conference football season. In their eighth season under head coach Stu Holcomb, the Boilermakers compiled a 5–3–1 record, finished in approximately sixth place in the Big Ten Conference with a 3–3 record against conference opponents, and outscored opponents by a total of about 165 to 134.

Notable players on the 1954 Purdue team included quarterback Len Dawson, guard Tom Bettis, and end John Kerr.

== Schedule ==
Date	Opponent	Rank	Site	Result	Attendance	Source
September 25	Missouri*		Ross–Ade Stadium; West Lafayette, IN	W 31–0	25,000	
October 2	at No. 1 Notre Dame*	No. 19	Notre Dame Stadium; Notre Dame, IN (rivalry)	W 27–14	58,250	
October 9	No. 6 Duke*	No. 5	Ross–Ade Stadium; West Lafayette, IN	T 13–13	47,000	
October 16	at No. 2 Wisconsin	No. 5	Camp Randall Stadium; Madison, WI	L 6–20	53,131	
October 23	at Michigan State	No. 13	Macklin Stadium; East Lansing, MI	W 27–13	52,619	
October 30	Illinois^{†}	No. 9	Ross–Ade Stadium; West Lafayette, IN (rivalry)	W 28–14	47,000	
November 6	at No. 12 Iowa	No. 8	Iowa Stadium; Iowa City, IA	L 14–25	52,900	
November 13	No. 2 Ohio State		Ross–Ade Stadium; West Lafayette, IN	L 6–28	51,000	
November 20	Indiana		Ross–Ade Stadium; West Lafayette, IN (Old Oaken Bucket)	W 13–7	39,424–44,000	
*Non-conference game; ^{†}Homecoming; Rankings from AP Poll released prior to the game

== Roster ==
- Johnny Allen, OL
- Tom Bettis, OL
- Rex Brock, RB
- Bob Clasey, OL
- Len Dawson, QB
- Phil Ehrman, RB
- Froncie Gutman, QB
- Walt Houston, OL
- John Kerr, WR
- Bob Khoenle, WR
- Joe Krupa, OL
- Lamar Lundy, WR
- Bill Murakowski, RB
- Dick Murley, OL
- Frank Paparazzo, OL
- Jim Peters, RB
- Dick Skibinski, OL
- Bob Springer, WR
- Jim Whitmer, RB
- Ed Zembal, RB
- Len Zyzda, WR
