= 1954 Minnesota Golden Gophers football team =

American college football season

1954 Minnesota Golden Gophers football
- Conference: Big Ten Conference

Ranking
- Coaches: No. 20
- Record: 7–2 (4–2 Big Ten)
- Head coach: Murray Warmath (1st season)
- MVP: Bob McNamara
- Captain: Bob McNamara
- Home stadium: Memorial Stadium

1954 Big Ten Conference football standings
	Conf.					Overall
Team	W		L		T	W		L		T
No. 1 Ohio State $	7	–	0	–	0	10	–	0	–	0
No. 9 Wisconsin	5	–	2	–	0	7	–	2	–	0
No. 15 Michigan	5	–	2	–	0	6	–	3	–	0
Minnesota	4	–	2	–	0	7	–	2	–	0
Iowa	4	–	3	–	0	5	–	4	–	0
Purdue	3	–	3	–	0	5	–	3	–	1
Indiana	2	–	4	–	0	3	–	6	–	0
Michigan State	1	–	5	–	0	3	–	6	–	0
Northwestern	1	–	5	–	0	2	–	7	–	0
Illinois	0	–	6	–	0	1	–	8	–	0
$ – Conference champion; Rankings from AP Poll

The 1954 Minnesota Golden Gophers football team represented the University of Minnesota in the 1954 Big Ten Conference football season. In their first year under head coach Murray Warmath, the Golden Gophers compiled a 7–2 record and outscored their opponents by a combined total of 195 to 127. The team finished the season ranked #20 in the final Coaches poll.

Halfback Bob McNamara received the team's Most Valuable Player award, and was selected by the Football Writers Association of America (for Look magazine) as a first-team player on the 1954 College Football All-America Team. He was also selected by the Associated Press as a first-team player on its 1954 All-Big Ten Conference football team. Fullback John Baumgartner was named Academic All-Big Ten.

Total attendance for the season was 347,555, which averaged to 57,925. The season high for attendance was against Iowa.

== Schedule ==
Date	Opponent	Rank	Site	Result	Attendance
September 25	Nebraska*		Memorial Stadium; Minneapolis, MN (rivalry)	W 19–7	53,027
October 2	at Pittsburgh*		Pitt Stadium; Pittsburgh, PA	W 46–7	33,369
October 9	Northwestern	No. 18	Memorial Stadium; Minneapolis, MN	W 26–7	53,663
October 16	Illinois	No. 11	Memorial Stadium; Minneapolis, MN	W 19–6	63,339
October 23	at Michigan	No. 8	Michigan Stadium; Ann Arbor, MI (Little Brown Jug)	L 0–34	83,060
October 30	Michigan State^{†}		Memorial Stadium; Minneapolis, MN	W 19–13	63,360
November 6	Oregon State	No. 14	Memorial Stadium; Minneapolis, MN	W 44–6	48,702
November 13	No. 9 Iowa	No. 13	Memorial Stadium; Minneapolis, MN (rivalry)	W 22–20	65,464
November 20	at No. 17 Wisconsin	No. 10	Camp Randall Stadium; Madison, WI (rivalry)	L 0–27	51,131
*Non-conference game; ^{†}Homecoming; Rankings from AP Poll released prior to the game

== Roster ==
- Gino Cappelletti #15
