= 1954 All-Big Ten Conference football team =

American college football all-star team

The 1954 All-Big Ten Conference football team consists of American football players chosen by the Associated Press (AP), the United Press (UP), and newspaper sports editors (Ed) as the best players at their positions during the 1954 Big Ten Conference football season. The UP team was selected by the Big Ten head coaches.

The 1954 Ohio State Buckeyes football team, under head coach Woody Hayes, won the national championship and placed five players on at least one of the first teams: halfback Howard Cassady (AP-1, UP-1, INS-1, Ed-1); end Dean Dugger (AP-1, UP-1, INS-1, Ed-1); halfback Bobby Watkins (AP-2, UP-2, INS-2, Ed-1); tackle Francis Machinsky (AP-2, UP-1, Ed-2); and tackle Dick Hilinski (AP-1, UP-2). Cassady was also a consensus All-American.

The 1954 Wisconsin Badgers football team, under head coach Ivy Williamson, tied for second place, and placed two players on the first team: fullback Don Ameche (AP-1, UP-1, INS-1, Ed-1) and center Gary Messner (AP-1, UP-1, INS-1, Ed-1). Ameche also won the 1954 Heisman Trophy.

Purdue quarterback Len Dawson led the conference with 1,464 passing yards and was the consensus pick at quarterback.

== All-Big Ten selections ==
=== Ends ===
- Dean Dugger, Ohio State (AP-1; UP-1; INS-1; Ed-1)
- Ron Kramer, Michigan (AP-1; UP-1; INS-1; Ed-1)
- John Kerr, Purdue (AP-2; UP-2; INS-2; Ed-2)
- Frank Gilliam, Iowa (AP-2)
- Jim Temp, Wisconsin (UP-2)
- Ron Locklin, Wisconsin (UP-3; INS-2; Ed-2)
- Dick Brubaker, Ohio State (UP-3)

=== Tackles ===
- Art Walker, Michigan (AP-1; UP-1; INS-1; Ed-1)
- Dick Hilinski, Ohio State (AP-1; UP-2)
- Sanford Sacks, Northwestern (INS-1)
- Randy Schrecengost, Michigan State (Ed-1)
- Francis Machinsky, Ohio State (AP-2; UP-1; Ed-2)
- Nate Borden, Indiana (AP-2; UP-3; INS-2)
- John Hall, Iowa (UP-2; Ed-2)
- Rodger Swedberg, Iowa (Ed-2)
- Joe Krupa, Purdue (INS-2)
- Bob Hobert, Minnesota (UP-3)

=== Guards ===
- Cal Jones, Iowa (AP-1; UP-1; INS-1; Ed-1)
- Tom Bettis, Purdue (AP-1; UP-1; INS-1; Ed-1)
- Jan Smid, Illinois (AP-2; UP-2; INS-2; Ed-2)
- Jim Reichenbach, Ohio State (AP-2; UP-2)
- Mike Falls, Minnesota (INS-2)
- Jim Parker, Ohio State (UP-3)
- Clarence Stensby, Wisconsin (UP-3)

=== Centers ===
- Gary Messner, Wisconsin (AP-1; UP-1; INS-1; Ed-1)
- Chuck Stamschror, Minnesota (AP-2; INS-2; Ed-2)
- John Damore, Northwestern (UP-2)
- Ken Vargo, Ohio State (UP-3)

=== Quarterbacks ===
- Len Dawson, Purdue (AP-1; UP-1; INS-1; Ed-1)
- Dave Leggett, Ohio State (AP-2; UP-2)
- Florian Helinski, Indiana (UP-3; INS-2; Ed-2)

=== Halfbacks ===
- Howard Cassady, Ohio State (AP-1; UP-1; INS-1; Ed-1)
- Bob McNamara, Minnesota (AP-1; UP-1 INS-1; Ed-2)
- Bobby Watkins, Ohio State (AP-2; UP-2; INS-2; Ed-1)
- Edward Vincent Jr., Iowa (AP-2; UP-3; INS-2)
- Earl Smith, Iowa (UP-2; Ed-2)
- John Matsock, Michigan State (UP-3)

=== Fullbacks ===
- Alan Ameche, Wisconsin (AP-1; UP-1; INS-1; Ed-1)
- Hubert Bobo, Ohio State (AP-2; UP-2; INS-2; Ed-2)
- Bob Lauter, Northwestern (UP-3)

== Key ==
AP = Associated Press

UP = United Press, selected by conference coaches for the United Press

INS = International News Service

Ed = Sports editors 1954 all-conference team

Bold - named to the first team by at least three of the four selectors

== See also ==
- 1954 College Football All-America Team
