= 1954 Michigan Wolverines football team =

American college football season

1954 Michigan Wolverines football
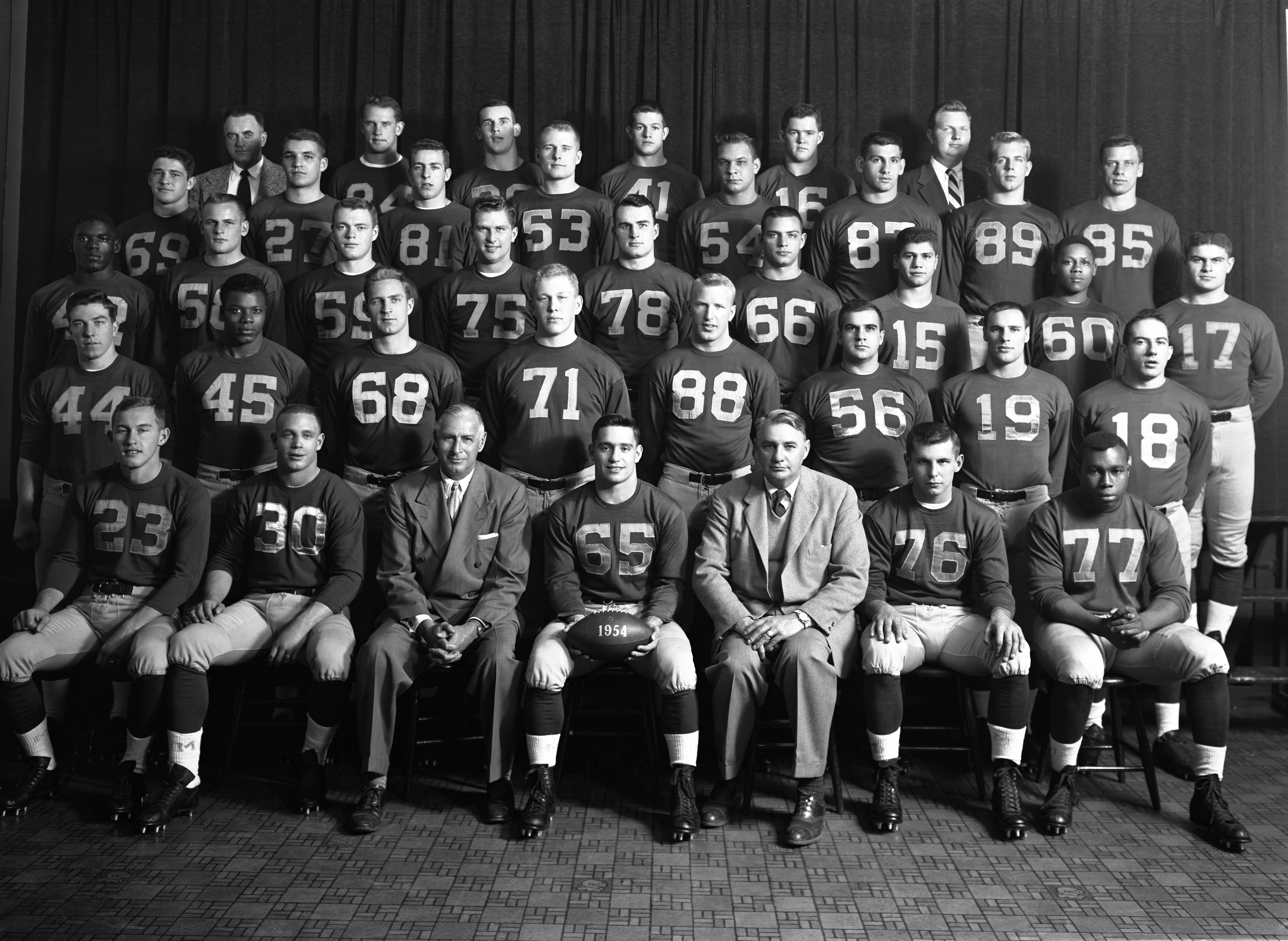
- Conference: Big Ten Conference

Ranking
- Coaches: No. 15
- AP: No. 15
- Record: 6–3 (5–2 Big Ten)
- Head coach: Bennie Oosterbaan (7th season)
- MVP: Fred Baer
- Captain: Ted Cachey
- Home stadium: Michigan Stadium

1954 Big Ten Conference football standings
	Conf.					Overall
Team	W		L		T	W		L		T
No. 1 Ohio State $	7	–	0	–	0	10	–	0	–	0
No. 9 Wisconsin	5	–	2	–	0	7	–	2	–	0
No. 15 Michigan	5	–	2	–	0	6	–	3	–	0
Minnesota	4	–	2	–	0	7	–	2	–	0
Iowa	4	–	3	–	0	5	–	4	–	0
Purdue	3	–	3	–	0	5	–	3	–	1
Indiana	2	–	4	–	0	3	–	6	–	0
Michigan State	1	–	5	–	0	3	–	6	–	0
Northwestern	1	–	5	–	0	2	–	7	–	0
Illinois	0	–	6	–	0	1	–	8	–	0
$ – Conference champion; Rankings from AP Poll

The 1954 Michigan Wolverines football team represented the University of Michigan in the 1954 Big Ten Conference football season. In its seventh year under head coach Bennie Oosterbaan, Michigan compiled a 6–3 record (5–2 against conference opponents), tied for second place in the Big Ten, outscored opponents by a combined total of 139 to 87, and was ranked No. 15 in the final AP and Coaches Polls.

Left guard Ted Cachey was the team captain, and fullback Fred Baer received the team's most valuable player award,

Two Michigan players received All-American honors: left end Ron Kramer was selected as a first-team All-American by the Central Press Association, and left tackle Art Walker received first-team honors from the All-America Board and the Football Writers Association of America.

The team's statistical leaders included quarterback Jim Maddock with 293 passing yards, Fred Baer with 439 rushing yards, and Ron Kramer with 303 receiving yards.

== Schedule ==
Date	Opponent	Rank	Site	Result	Attendance
September 25	at Washington*		Husky Stadium; Seattle, WA	W 14–0	35,076
October 2	Army*		Michigan Stadium; Ann Arbor, MI	L 7–26	69,161–69,783
October 9	No. 4 Iowa		Michigan Stadium; Ann Arbor, MI	W 14–13	64,283
October 16	at Northwestern		Dyche Stadium; Evanston, IL (rivalry)	W 7–0	32,972
October 23	No. 8 Minnesota^{†}		Michigan Stadium; Ann Arbor, MI (Little Brown Jug)	W 34–0	70,740
October 30	Indiana	No. 11	Michigan Stadium; Ann Arbor, MI	L 9–13	49,817
November 6	Illinois		Michigan Stadium; Ann Arbor, MI (rivalry)	W 14–7	58,777
November 13	Michigan State		Michigan Stadium; Ann Arbor, MI (rivalry)	W 33–7	97,239
November 20	at No. 1 Ohio State	No. 12	Ohio Stadium; Columbus, OH (rivalry)	L 7–21	78,447
*Non-conference game; ^{†}Homecoming; Rankings from AP Poll released prior to game

== Statistical leaders ==
Michigan's individual statistical leaders for the 1954 season include those listed below.

=== Rushing ===
Player	Attempts	Net yards	Yards per attempt	Touchdowns
Fred Baer	107	439	4.1	3
Dan Cline	97	340	3.5	3
Ed Hickey	45	169	3.8	0
Lou Baldacci	46	152	3.3	4

=== Passing ===
Player	Attempts	Completions	Interceptions	Comp %	Yards	Yds/Comp	TD	Long
Jim Maddock	35	16	5	45.7	293	18.3	1	33
Dan Cline	43	15	4	34.9	281	18.7	3	63
Duncan McDonald	36	15	6	41.7	237	15.8	1	32

=== Receiving ===
Player	Receptions	Yards	Yds/Recp	TD	Long
Ron Kramer	23	303	13.2	2	29
Lou Baldacci	8	211	26.4	1	63
Dan Cline	6	61	10.2	0	33

=== Kickoff returns ===
Player	Returns	Yards	Yds/Return	TD	Long
Dan Cline	8	164	20.5	0	34
Ed Hickey	2	32	16.0	0	24

=== Punt returns ===
Player	Returns	Yards	Yds/Return	TD	Long
Dan Cline	13	113	8.7	0	22
Tom Hendricks	1	67	67.0	1	67
Terry Barr	4	56	14.0	0	25
Ron Kramer	3	43	14.3	0	26

=== Scoring ===
Player	TD (rush)	TD (rec.)	TD (oth.)	Other type	PAT att	PAT made	Points
Ron Kramer	0	2	1	Blk Punt	14	13	31
Lou Baldacci	4	1	0		1	1	31
Fred Baer	3	0	0		0	0	18
Dan Cline	3	0	0		0	0	18

== Personnel ==
=== Letter winners ===
The following 33 players received varsity letters for their participation on the 1954 team. Players who started at least four games are shown with their names in bold.

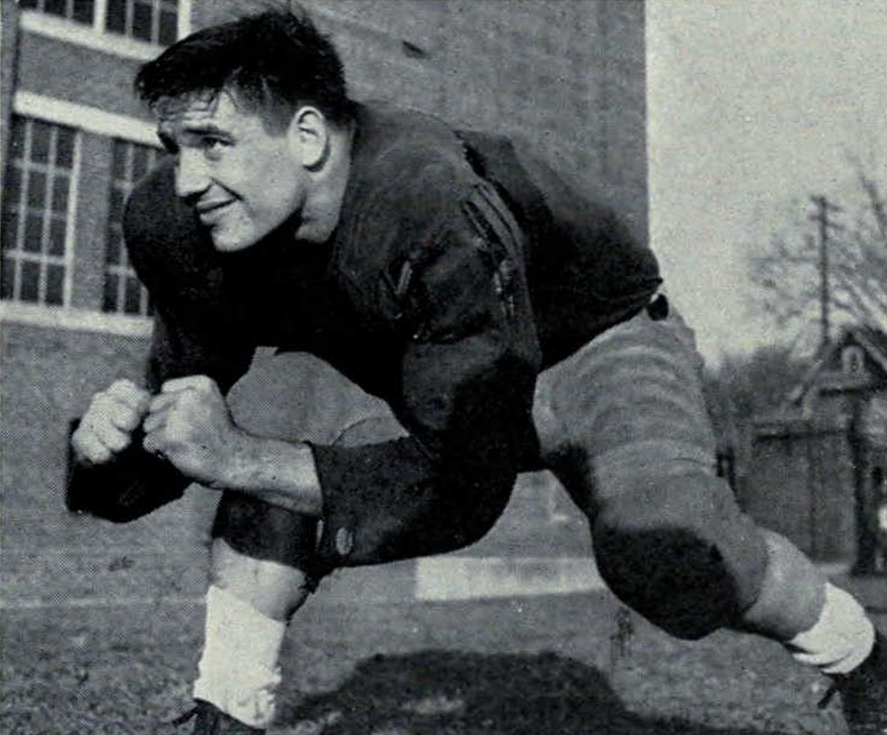
Team captain Ted Cachey

- **Fred Baer**, 5'11", 188 pounds, senior, LaGrange, IL – started 6 games at fullback
- **Lou Baldacci**, 6'1", 196 pounds, junior, Akron, OH – started 5 games at quarterback, 1 game at fullback
- Terry Barr, 6'1", 172 pounds, sophomore, Grand Rapids, MI - halfback
- **James Bates**, 6'0", 198 pounds, senior, Farmington, MI – started 4 games at center
- Tony Branoff, 5'11", 188 pounds, junior, Flint, MI – started 2 games at right halfback
- Charles Brooks, 6'1", 202 pounds, sophomore, Marshall, MI - end
- **Ted Cachey**, 5'10", 178 pounds, senior, Chicago – started 9 games at left guard
- **Daniel Cline**, 5'10" 175 pounds, senior, Brockport, NY – started 9 games at left halfback
- George Corey, 5'10", 163 pounds, junior, Baden, PA - halfback
- Don Drake, 5'11", 213 pounds, senior, Ypsilanti, MI - center
- Jim Fox, 6'0", 190 pounds, junior, Saginaw, MI - guard
- **Ronald Geyer**, 6'2", 225 pounds, senior, Toledo, OH – started 6 games at right tackle
- Jerry Goebel, 6'3", 214 pounds, sophomore, Grosse Pointe, MI - center
- Tom Hendricks, 5'11", 181 pounds, junior, Detroit - halfback
- Edward Hickey, 5'8", 173 pounds, senior, Anaconda, MT – started 1 game at right halfback
- Dave Hill, 6'0", 188 pounds, junior, Ypsilanti, MI – started 2 games at fullback
- Stan Knickerbocker, 5'11", 173 pounds, senior, Chelsea, MI - halfback
- Bill Kolesar, 6'0", 221 pounds, junior, Mentor, OH - tackle
- **Ron Kramer**, 6'3", 210 pounds, sophomore, East Detroit, MI – started 9 games at left end
- Jim Maddock, 6'0", 187 pounds, sophomore, Chicago – started 1 game at quarterback
- **Tom Maentz**, 6'2", 205 pounds, sophomore, Holland, MI – started 5 games at right end
- Bob Marion, 5'10", 192 pounds, junior, Muskegon Heights, MI - guard
- Duncan McDonald, 6'0", 170 pounds, senior, Flint, MI – started 3 games at quarterback
- **Ed Meads**, 6'0", 199 pounds, junior, Oxford, MI – started 9 games at right guard
- John Morrow, 6'2", 228 pounds, junior, Ann Arbor, MI – started 3 games at right tackle
- John Peckham, 6'2", 227 pounds, junior, Sioux Falls, SD – started 2 games at center
- Chuck Ritter, 6'0", 195 pounds, senior, Cassopolis, MI - guard
- Mike Rotunno, 6'0", 187 pounds, sophomore, Canton, OH - guard
- **Ed Shannon**, 5'8", 172 pounds, sophomore, River Forest, IL – started 6 games at right halfback
- Gene Snider, 6'0", 195 pounds, sophomore, Hamtramck, MI – started 3 games at center
- John Veselenak, 6'2", 192 pounds, senior, Flint, MI - end
- **Art Walker**, 5'11", 218 pounds, senior, South Haven, MI – started 9 games at left tackle
- **Gerry Williams**, 6'2", 189 pounds, junior, Flint, MI – started 4 games at right end

=== Coaches and staff ===
Michigan's 1954 coaching, training, and support staff included the following persons.

- Head coach: Bennie Oosterbaan
- Assistant coaches: Jack Blott, Don Dufek, Robert Hollway, Cliff Keen, Pete Kinyon, Matt Patanelli, Don Robinson, Walter Weber, J. T. White
- Trainer: Jim Hunt
- Manager: Glenn Bearss

== Awards and honors ==
Honors and awards for the 1954 season went to the following individuals.

- Captain: Ted Cachey
- All-Americans: Art Walker
- All-Conference: Art Walker, Ron Kramer
- Most Valuable Player: Fred Baer
- Meyer Morton Award: Don Dugger
