= Jim Parker (American football) =

American football player (1934–2005)

- Parker in 1960

No. 77
- Positions: Offensive tackle, guard

Personal information
- Born: April 3, 1934; Macon, Georgia, U.S.
- Died: July 18, 2005 (aged 71); Columbia, Maryland, U.S.
- Listed height: 6 ft 3 in (1.91 m)
- Listed weight: 273 lb (124 kg)

Career information
- High school: Scott (Toledo, Ohio)
- College: Ohio State (1954–1956)
- NFL draft: 1957: 1st round, 8th overall pick

Career history
- Baltimore Colts (1957–1967)

Awards and highlights
- 2× NFL champion (1958, 1959); 9× First-team All-Pro (1957–1965); Second-team All-Pro (1966); 8× Pro Bowl (1958–1965); NFL 1950s All-Decade Team; NFL 75th Anniversary All-Time Team; NFL 100th Anniversary All-Time Team; Baltimore Ravens Ring of Honor; Indianapolis Colts No. 77 retired; National champion (1954); Outland Trophy (1956); Unanimous All-American (1956); First-team All-American (1955); 2× First-team All-Big Ten (1955, 1956); First-team AP All-Time All-American (2025)

Career NFL statistics
- Games played: 135
- Games started: 133
- Fumble recoveries: 6
- Stats at Pro Football Reference
- Pro Football Hall of Fame
- College Football Hall of Fame

James Thomas Parker (April 3, 1934 – July 18, 2005) was an American professional football player who was an offensive tackle and guard for the Baltimore Colts of the National Football League (NFL). He played from 1957 to 1967, and was a member of Baltimore's NFL championship teams in 1958 and 1959. He was selected as a first-team All-Pro in nine of his 11 seasons in the NFL. Parker was inducted into the Pro Football Hall of Fame in 1973.

Parker grew up in Macon, Georgia, and played college football for the Ohio State Buckeyes under coach Woody Hayes from 1954 to 1956. He helped the Buckeyes win a national championship in 1954. As a senior in 1956, he was a unanimous All-American and won the Outland Trophy. He was inducted into the College Football Hall of Fame in 1974.

== Early life ==
Parker was born in 1934 in Macon, Georgia. He grew up on a farm where he picked peaches and cotton as a boy. He began playing football at age 13. He played his first three years of high school football at Hudson and Ballard-Hudson High Schools in Macon. He moved to Ohio before his senior year and played for Scott High School in Toledo. He graduated from high school in 1953. He received first string honors by the "Times" at tackle for the 1952 season. Ref 1953 Scottonian.

== College career ==
Parker played college football as a guard for the Ohio State Buckeyes from 1954 to 1956, playing on both the offense and defense. Parker was known for his size, strength and quickness, and these talents, used for clearing a path for running backs.

As a sophomore, Parker helped lead the 1954 Ohio State Buckeyes football team to a perfect 10–0 record and the No. 1 ranking in the final AP Poll.

As a junior, Parker was a key blocker for 1955 Heisman Trophy winner Howard Cassady. At the end of the season, Parker was named as a first-team All-American at guard by the Football Writers Association of America, the Central Press Association, and Jet magazine. He was also selected by both the Associated Press (AP) and United Press (UP) as a first-team guard on the 1955 All-Big Ten Conference football team.

As a senior in 1956, Parker was listed at six feet, two inches tall, weighed 262 pounds, and helped lead the Buckeyes to a 6–3 record. At the end of the season, he received multiple honors, including:

- Most valuable player on the 1956 Ohio State Buckeyes football team;
- Unanimous All-America selection'
- Winner of the Outland Trophy as the nation's top guard or tackle; and
- Finished eighth in the Heisman vote.

== Professional career ==
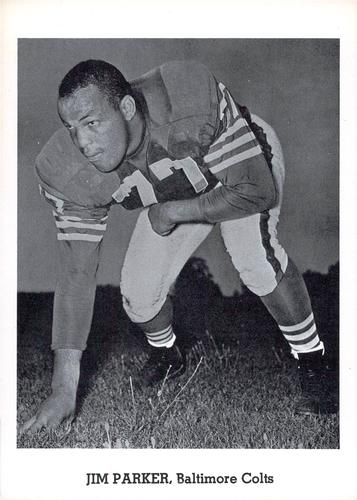
Parker in an official 1964 team publicity photo.

Parker was selected by the Baltimore Colts in the first round of the 1957 NFL draft as the eighth player selected overall. The Colts, with quarterback Johnny Unitas, relied on a passing offense very different from the running offense of Ohio State. Nevertheless, Parker soon came to be known as the premier pass blocker in the game.

From 1957 until 1962, Parker played as an offensive tackle. He was selected to five Pro Bowl teams in those six years. In 1963 Parker moved to the offensive guard position, as a favor to his college coach Woody Hayes, to make room for another former Buckeye, Bob Vogel. Parker was selected to three more Pro Bowls from the guard position.

Parker has been called "the best pure pass-blocker who ever lived. Knew all the tricks — the quick push-off, the short jab — that are legal now."

Parker injured his knee during a game against the Philadelphia Eagles on September 24, 1967. The injury ended Parker's streak of 139 consecutive games played for the Colts. He appeared in only three games in 1967 and announced his retirement in December 1967, explaining that he had been in pain since the injury and the knee had not improved. He noted at the time: "I feel I can't do it. I can't slide to my right and I can't run."

== Legacy and honors ==
Parker received numerous honors for his contributions to the sport. His honors include the following:

- Following his retirement in 1967, the Colts retired his jersey No. 77.
- In August 1969, Parker was named to the NFL's 1950s All-Decade Team.
- In September 1969, he was selected by the Football Writers Association of America as one of two guards on the all-time All-America team consisting of players from the modern era starting in 1920.
- In 1969, he was runner up at guard in the Hall of Fame selectors NFL 50th Anniversary All Time Team.
- He was inducted into the Pro Football Hall of Fame in 1973, his first year of eligibility. He was the first full-time offensive lineman so inducted.
- In 1974, he was inducted into the College Football Hall of Fame.
- Also in 1974, he was inducted into the Georgia Sports Hall of Fame.
- In 1977, he became a charter inductee in the Ohio State Varsity O Hall of Fame.
- In August 1994, he was named to the National Football League 75th Anniversary All-Time Team selected by a 15-person panel of NFL and Pro Football Hall of Fame officials, former players, and media representatives.
- In August 1999, Parker was ranked number 24 on The Sporting News' list of the 100 Greatest Football Players. He ranked second among guards behind John Hannah, and third among offensive linemen behind Hannah and Anthony Muñoz.
- Also in August 1999, Parker was selected as an offensive guard on the Sports Illustrated college-football All-Century team.
- In 2007, he was selected by The Atlanta Journal-Constitution at the No. 1 spot on its list of the top 25 all-time professional football players from Georgia.
- In 2019, he was named to the National Football League 100th Anniversary All-Time Team.

== Family and later years ==
From 1964 to 1999, Parker operated a liquor store in Baltimore's Liberty-Garrison neighborhood. In 1999, he suffered a stroke and closed the store.

Parker had 14 children and 23 grandchildren. He died in July 2005 at the Lorien Nursing Home in Columbia, Maryland, at age 71. The cause of death was congestive heart failure and chronic kidney disease. He was buried at King Memorial Park, Windsor Mill Manor, Baltimore County, Maryland.
