= 1955 All-Big Ten Conference football team =

American college football all-star team

The 1955 All-Big Ten Conference football team consists of American football players selected to the All-Big Ten Conference teams selected by the Associated Press (AP), United Press (UP) and the International News Service (INS) for the 1955 Big Ten Conference football season.

== All-Big Ten selections ==
=== Ends ===
- Ron Kramer, Michigan (AP-1, UP-1, INS-1)
- Tom Maentz, Michigan (AP-1, UP-1)
- Lamar Lundy, Purdue (AP-2, UP-2)
- Brad Bomba, Indiana (AP-2, UP-3, INS-1)
- Dave Howard, Wisconsin (UP-2)
- John Lewis, Michigan State (UP-3)

=== Tackles ===
- Cal Jones, Iowa (AP-1, UP-1 [guard], INS-1 [guard])
- Norm Masters, Michigan State (AP-1, UP-2, INS-1)
- Joe Krupa, Purdue (AP-2, UP-1, INS-1)
- Bob Hobert, Minnesota (AP-2, UP-3)
- Dick Murley, Purdue (UP-2)
- Bob Skoronski, Indiana (UP-3)

=== Guards ===
- Jim Parker, Ohio State (AP-1, UP-1)
- Carl Nystrom, Michigan State (AP-1, UP-2, INS-1)
- Wells Gray, Wisconsin (AP-2, UP-2)
- Francis Machinsky, Ohio State (AP-2, UP-1 [tackle])
- Dave Weaver, Ohio State (UP-3)
- Dave Hill, Michigan (UP-3)

=== Centers ===
- Ken Vargo, Ohio State (AP-1, UP-1, INS-1)
- Joe Amstutz, Indiana (AP-2)
- James Bates, Michigan (UP-2)
- Joe Badaczewki, Michigan State (UP-3)

=== Quarterbacks ===
- Earl Morrall, Michigan State (AP-1, UP-1 [quarterback], INS-1 [quarterback])
- Len Dawson, Purdue (AP-2, UP-2 [quarterback])
- Jerry Reichow, Iowa (UP-3 [quarterback])

=== Halfbacks ===
- Howard Cassady, Ohio State (AP-1, UP-1 [halfback], INS-1)
- Tony Branoff, Michigan (UP-1 [halfback])
- Bobby Mitchell, Illinois (AP-1)
- Walt Kowalczyk, Michigan State (AP-2, UP-2 [halfback])
- Harry Jefferson, Illinois (AP-2, UP-3 [halfback], INS-1)
- Edward Vincent Jr., Iowa (UP-2 [halfback], INS-1)
- Clarence Peaks, Michigan State (UP-3 [halfback])

=== Fullbacks ===
- Bill Murakowski, Purdue (AP-1, UP-2 [fullback])
- Jerry Planutis, Michigan State (AP-2, UP-1 [fullback])
- Lou Baldacci, Michigan (UP-3 [fullback])

== Key ==
AP = Associated Press, chosen by conference coaches

UP = United Press

INS = International News Service

== See also ==
- 1955 College Football All-America Team
