= Tom Maentz =

American football player (1934–2025)

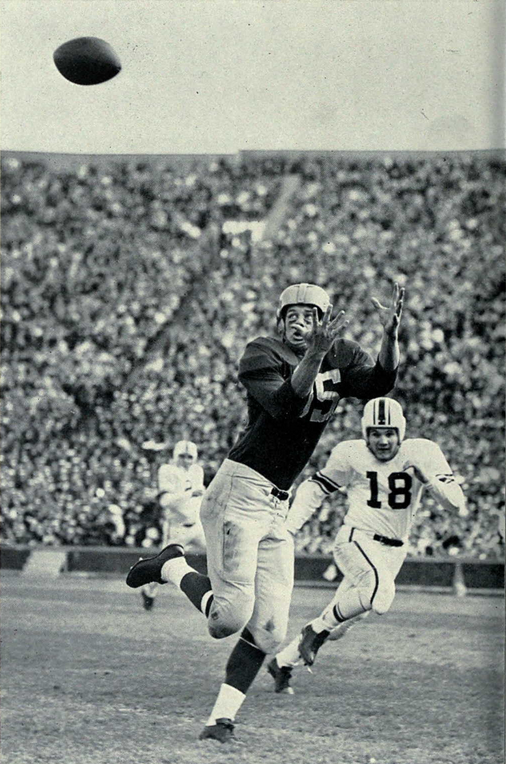

Profile
- Position: End

Personal information
- Born: October 20, 1934; Holland, Michigan, U.S.
- Died: December 22, 2025 (aged 91); Bloomfield Hills, Michigan, U.S.

Career information
- High school: Holland High School; The Kiski School
- College: Michigan (1953–1956)
- NFL draft: 1957: 2nd round, 22nd overall pick

Career history
- Chicago Cardinals (1957)*
- * Offseason or practice squad member only

Awards and highlights
- Second-team All-American (1955); Third-team All-American (1956); First-team All-Big Ten (1955); Second-team All-Big Ten (1956); University of Michigan Athletic Hall of Honor (1994); Gerald R. Ford Lifetime Impact Award (2019)

Thomas Scott Maentz (October 20, 1934 – December 22, 2025) was an American football player and businessman. He played college football as an end for the Michigan Wolverines from 1954 to 1956. Maentz played on offense and defense and also served as the punter for the Michigan football team. Maentz and Ron Kramer became known as Michigan's "touchdown twins" and were the first University of Michigan athletes to appear on the cover of Sports Illustrated. Maentz won first-team All-Big Ten and second-team All-American honors in 1955 and was elected captain of the 1956 Michigan team. He was inducted into the University of Michigan Athletic Hall of Honor in 1994 and in 2019 was the inaugural recipient of the Gerald R. Ford Lifetime Impact Award.

== Early life ==
Maentz was born in Holland, Michigan, on October 20, 1934, where he was raised. His father Henry S. Maentz was the president of the First National Bank of Holland and a Holland community leader.

He attended Holland High School, where he was a standout athlete. After graduating from Holland High School in 1952, Maentz attended The Kiski School, a preparatory boarding school in Saltsburg, Pennsylvania. The 1953 Kiski yearbook described Maentz as "Kiski’s All-American Boy...rated as one of the grid greats, whose competitive spirit is nonpareil…outstanding basketball player...destined for success both athletically and in his life's ambition." He set a Kiski basketball record scoring 39 points in one game and was also known for "remarkable rebounding prowess."

== University of Michigan ==
=== 1953 and 1954 seasons ===
Maentz enrolled at the University of Michigan in 1953. He played for Michigan's freshman football team that fall. During downfield blocking practice in April 1954, Maentz's jaw was fractured and had to be wired shut, with Maentz placed on a liquid diet for six to seven weeks.

He recovered from the jaw injury in time for the 1954 football season. He was paired with future College Football Hall of Fame inductee Ron Kramer at the right and left end positions. Maentz appeared in all nine games for the 1954 Michigan football team and became a starter in the final five games. Maentz won the starting spot "mostly because of his defensive ability," but he played on offense, defense, and special teams, intercepting a pass at a key point in the Iowa game and scoring two points on a safety after blocking a kick against Indiana.

Maentz and Kramer (both measuring 6'3") were also the only two football players to play for the 1954–55 Michigan Wolverines men's basketball team.

=== Michigan's "touchdown twins" ===
During a pre-season scrimmage in mid-September 1955, Maentz injured his back with x-rays showing three cracked transverse processes, the portions of the vertebrae that project laterally from the spine. Maentz's doctor reported that Maentz needed rest and physical therapy and would "definitely" be out of action for six to eight weeks and "maybe the entire season." Despite the doctor's prognoxis, Maentz missed only two games and started the remaining seven games.

Maentz and Kramer became known in 1955, due to their scoring prowess, as Michigan's "touchdown twins". Michigan coach Bennie Oosterbaan called them "the two greatest ends in the country." They appeared together on the cover of Sports Illustrated on November 12, 1956, the first Michigan players to receive the honor. Some 45 years after their appearance on the cover, Sports Illustrated published a follow-up story of the pair: "It seems they've done everything together since coming to Ann Arbor from different sides of the state. Maentz was the quiet kid from western Michigan, the son of a banker; Kramer was the unpolished Detroiter. But, says Kramer, they found a 'common denominator' in football and lived in the same dorms and at the Sigma Chi fraternity house for four years."

In October 1955, Maentz was named the United Press Midwest lineman of the week after making a leaping one-handed catch to set up a touchdown and catching another for the winning touchdown against Minnesota. The following week against Iowa, Maentz was selected by the Associated Press as its national lineman of the week after tallying 169 receiving yards and two touchdowns, including the go-ahead score with three minutes left against Iowa. After the Iowa game, Michigan halfback Tony Branoff said, "Tom played one of the greatest games. He's as good as Kramer, and after he caught that touchdown pass Iowa's heads were down."

Despite missing two games and wearing a protective plastic shell screwed to his hip pad (to protect against reinjuring his back), Maentz led Michigan in receiving yards in 1955. Maentz also excelled as a kicker, punting 15 times in 1955 for 602 yards and an average of 40.1 yards. At the end of the season Maentz received first-team honors from both the Associated Press (AP) and the United Press (UP) on the 1955 All-Big Ten Conference football team. He also received second-team honors from the AP and UP on the 1955 All-America team. Watson Spoelstra wrote that, though Maentz "isn't quite as big" or fast as Kramer, Maentz's determination made him a special player. Spoelstra reported that coach Oosterbaan, himself one of the greatest ends of all time, "marveled aloud" about Maentz's spectacular catches, how he would "run like mad to get that ball," and concluding, "Tom never gives up. ... Tom never will be as big as Kramer, but he is well knit.'"

=== Captain of the 1956 team ===
Maentz was elected by his teammates as the captain of the 1956 Michigan football team. Upon learning of his election, residents of Maentz's hometown, Holland, Michigan, held a "Tom Maentz Night" at the Holland Civic Center attended by 600 area residents. At the time, Maentz called it "the greatest honor I've ever received and I'll never forget it." At the dinner in Maentz's honor, Michigan ends coach, Matt Patanelli described Maentz as an "ideal athlete," who was a champion in the classroom and on the football field. Patanelli noted that Maentz had demonstrated his toughness, continuing to play football after suffering a broken jaw as a freshman, a neck injury as a sophomore, and a back injury as a junior.

As captain, Maentz led the 1956 Wolverines to a 7–2 record and the No. 7 ranking in the final AP poll. After the season, Maentz played in the East–West All-Star Shrine Game and was named as a third-team All-American by the United Press, Central Press Association, and Newspaper Enterprise Association.

== Personal life and death ==
Maentz graduated from Michigan in 1957. He was drafted by the Chicago Cardinals in the second round as the 22nd overall pick in the 1957 NFL draft and signed a contract with the club in January 1957. However, after playing on the college all-star team against the New York Giants in early August, Maentz announced that he had decided not to play professional football and would instead return to the University of Michigan to complete graduate work in business administration.

He began his business career with Keeler Brass in Grand Rapids, Michigan. He started an automotive sales firm in 1960. He also worked for a time as a manufacturer's representative in the Detroit area. In 1978, he opened a manufacturing company in Birmingham, Michigan. The company, TSM Corporation (TSM being Maentz's initials) grew to more than 200 machines and 180 employees. Maentz remained active in the company until his retirement in 2017.

Maentz married his college sweetheart, JoAnn Monger, in 1957. They remained married for 68 years until Maentz's death. They had three children: Tom II, Katie, and Susan. Maentz died at his home in Bloomfield Hills, Michigan, on December 22, 2025, at the age of 91.

== Honors ==
Maentz was inducted into the University of Michigan Athletic Hall of Honor in 1994. In 2003, Maentz donated funds to build a new locker room for the Wolverines at Michigan Stadium. In 2019, Maentz was the inaugural recipient of the Gerald R. Ford Lifetime Impact Award as a distinguished and uncommon "Michigan Man" and football alumnus "for living a courageous and meaningful life."
