= 1954 Iowa Hawkeyes football team =

American college football season

1954 Iowa Hawkeyes football
- Conference: Big Ten Conference
- Record: 5–4 (4–3 Big Ten)
- Head coach: Forest Evashevski (3rd season)
- MVP: Warren Lawson
- Captain: George Broeder
- Home stadium: Iowa Stadium

1954 Big Ten Conference football standings
	Conf.					Overall
Team	W		L		T	W		L		T
No. 1 Ohio State $	7	–	0	–	0	10	–	0	–	0
No. 9 Wisconsin	5	–	2	–	0	7	–	2	–	0
No. 15 Michigan	5	–	2	–	0	6	–	3	–	0
Minnesota	4	–	2	–	0	7	–	2	–	0
Iowa	4	–	3	–	0	5	–	4	–	0
Purdue	3	–	3	–	0	5	–	3	–	1
Indiana	2	–	4	–	0	3	–	6	–	0
Michigan State	1	–	5	–	0	3	–	6	–	0
Northwestern	1	–	5	–	0	2	–	7	–	0
Illinois	0	–	6	–	0	1	–	8	–	0
$ – Conference champion; Rankings from AP Poll

The 1954 Iowa Hawkeyes football team was an American football team that represented the University of Iowa as a member of the Big Ten Conference during the 1954 Big Ten football season. In their third season under head coach Forest Evashevski, the Hawkeyes compiled a 5–4 record (4–3 in conference games), finished in fifth place in the Big Ten, and outscored opponents by a total of 192 to 141.

The 1954 Hawkeyes gained 2,083 rushing yards and 677 passing yards. On defense, they gave up 1,496 rushing yards and 913 passing yards.

The team's statistical leaders included Eddie Vincent (618 rushing yards); Jerry Reichow (34-of-73 passing for 386 yards); Frank Gilliam (15 receptions for 223 yards); and Earl Smith (66 points scored, 17.8 yard per punt return). Guard Cal Jones was a consensus All-American. Eddie Vincent set the Iowa record (still intact) for longest run from scrimmage with a 96-yard run against Purdue on November 6, 1954.

Iowa's game against Michigan State was nationally televised on ABC, the second Iowa game to be televised. The team played its home games at Iowa Stadium in Iowa City, Iowa. Home attendance was 245,421, an average of 49,084 per game.

== Schedule ==
Date	Opponent	Rank	Site	TV	Result	Attendance	Source
September 25	No. 7 Michigan State	No. 12	Iowa Stadium; Iowa City, IA	ABC	W 14–10	50,000	
October 2	Montana*	No. 3	Iowa Stadium; Iowa City, IA		W 48–6	37,590	
October 9	at Michigan	No. 4	Michigan Stadium; Ann Arbor, MI		L 13–14	64,283	
October 16	at No. 4 Ohio State	No. 13	Ohio Stadium; Columbus, OH		L 14–20	82,141	
October 23	at Indiana		Memorial Stadium; Bloomington, IN		W 27–14	30,789	
October 30	No. 8 Wisconsin		Iowa Stadium; Iowa City, IA (rivalry)		W 13–7	52,185	
November 6	No. 8 Purdue^{†}	No. 12	Iowa Stadium; Iowa City, IA		W 25–14	52,900	
November 13	at No. 13 Minnesota	No. 9	Memorial Stadium; Minneapolis, MN (rivalry)		L 20–22	65,464	
November 20	No. 4 Notre Dame*	No. 19	Iowa Stadium; Iowa City, IA		L 18–34	56,576	
*Non-conference game; ^{†}Homecoming; Rankings from AP Poll released prior to the game

== Personnel ==
=== Players ===
The following players received varsity letters for their performance on the 1954 Iowa football team:

- George "Binky" Broeder, fullback and captain, No. 32, St. Louis, MO
- Cameron Cummins, tackle, No. 72, Cedar Rapids, IA
- Richard Deasy, tackle, No. 73, Chicago
- Don Dobrino, quarterback, No. 20, Mt. Olive, IL
- James Freeman, end, No. 80, Iowa City, IA
- Frank Gilliam, end, junior, No. 87, Steubenville, OH
- Lester Green, tackle, No. 78
- John Hall, tackle, senior, No. 75, Chicago
- Jim Hatch, fullback, Lancaster, WI
- James Head, fullback, No. 42, Evansville, IN
- Don Inman, halfback, No. 40, Tama, IA
- Cal Jones, guard, junior, No. 62, Steubenville, OH
- Dick Klein, tackle, senior
- Bud Lawson, center, No. 50, Fairfield, IA
- Eldean Matheson, halfback, No. 12, Lake Mills, IA
- Lou Matykiewicz, quarterback/end, senior, No. 23, Calumet Park, IL
- Kenneth Meek, end, No. 82, Ladd, IL
- Terry Moran, guard, No. 63, River Forest, IL
- Ken Ploen, quarterback, No. 11, Clinton, IA
- Bill Reichow, guard, No. 21, Decorah, IA
- Jerry Reichow, quarterback, junior, No. 25
- Terry Shuck, tackle, No. 79, Des Moines, IA
- Norman Six, center, No. 52, Newell, WV
- Earl Smith Jr., halfback, No. 14, Gary, IN
- Robert Stearnes, halfback, No. 44, Gary, IN
- Donald Suchy, center, No. 55, Belle Plaine, IA
- Rodger Swedberg, tackle, No. 74, Sycamore, IL
- Eddie Vincent, halfback, junior, No. 41, Steubenville, OH
- Roger Wiegmann, fullback, No. 30, Waverly, IA

=== Coaches ===
- Head coach - Forest Evashevski
- Assistant coaches - Bump Elliott, Whitey Piro, Jerry Burns (freshman)

== Awards and honors ==
Guard Cal Jones was a consensus first-team pick on the 1954 All-America team. He also received first-team honors from the AP, UP, and INS on the 1954 All-Big Ten Conference football team. Jones was later inducted into the College Football Hall of Fame.

Fullback George "Binky" Broeder was the team captain.

Center Warren Lawson was selected as the team's most valuable player.
