= 1954 Michigan State Spartans football team =

American college football season

1954 Michigan State Spartans football
- Conference: Big Ten Conference
- Record: 3–6 (1–5 Big Ten)
- Head coach: Duffy Daugherty (1st season)
- MVP: John Matsock
- Captains: LeRoy Bolden; Don Kauth
- Home stadium: Macklin Stadium

1954 Big Ten Conference football standings
	Conf.					Overall
Team	W		L		T	W		L		T
No. 1 Ohio State $	7	–	0	–	0	10	–	0	–	0
No. 9 Wisconsin	5	–	2	–	0	7	–	2	–	0
No. 15 Michigan	5	–	2	–	0	6	–	3	–	0
Minnesota	4	–	2	–	0	7	–	2	–	0
Iowa	4	–	3	–	0	5	–	4	–	0
Purdue	3	–	3	–	0	5	–	3	–	1
Indiana	2	–	4	–	0	3	–	6	–	0
Michigan State	1	–	5	–	0	3	–	6	–	0
Northwestern	1	–	5	–	0	2	–	7	–	0
Illinois	0	–	6	–	0	1	–	8	–	0
$ – Conference champion; Rankings from AP Poll

The 1954 Michigan State Spartans football team represented Michigan State College in the 1954 Big Ten Conference football season. In their second season in the Big Ten Conference and their first season under head coach Duffy Daugherty, the Spartans compiled a 3–6 overall record and 1–5 against Big Ten opponents.

The Spartans' prospects were diminished when their best back, Leroy Bolden, was injured in the early in the 1954 season. Michigan State tackle Randy Schrecengost was selected as a first-team player on the 1954 All-Big Ten Conference football team.

The 1954 Spartans won one of their three annual rivalry games. In the annual Indiana–Michigan State football rivalry game, the Spartans defeated the Hoosiers by a 21 to 14 score to give Daugherty his first victory as head coach. In the Notre Dame rivalry game, the Spartans lost by only one point, 20-19, to a Fighting Irish team that finished the season ranked #4 in the final AP Poll. And, in the annual Michigan–Michigan State football rivalry game, the Spartans lost by a 33 to 7 score.

In non-conference play, the Spartans routed Washington State by a 54 to 6 score, and concluded their season with a 40-10 victory over Marquette.

== Schedule ==
Date	Opponent	Rank	Site	Result	Attendance
September 25	at No. 12 Iowa	No. 7	Iowa Stadium; Iowa City, IA	L 10–14	50,000
October 2	No. 5 Wisconsin	No. 13	Macklin Stadium; East Lansing, MI	L 0–6	51,194
October 9	at Indiana		Memorial Stadium; Bloomington, IN (rivalry)	W 21–14	27,411
October 16	at No. 8 Notre Dame*		Notre Dame Stadium; Notre Dame, IN (rivalry)	L 19–20	67,238
October 23	No. 13 Purdue^{†}		Macklin Stadium; East Lansing, MI	L 13–27	52,619
October 30	at Minnesota		Memorial Stadium; Minneapolis, MN	L 13–19	63,575
November 6	Washington State*		Macklin Stadium; East Lansing, MI	W 54–6	45,849
November 13	at Michigan		Michigan Stadium; Ann Arbor, MI (rivalry)	L 7–33	97,239
November 20	Marquette*		Macklin Stadium; East Lansing, MI	W 40–10	39,354
*Non-conference game; ^{†}Homecoming; Rankings from AP Poll released prior to the game

== Roster ==
- G Hank Bullough, Sr.
