= 1954 Illinois Fighting Illini football team =

American college football season

1954 Illinois Fighting Illini football
- Conference: Big Ten Conference
- Record: 1–8 (0–6 Big Ten)
- Head coach: Ray Eliot (13th season)
- MVP: Jack Chamblin
- Captain: Jan Smid
- Home stadium: Memorial Stadium

1954 Big Ten Conference football standings
	Conf.					Overall
Team	W		L		T	W		L		T
No. 1 Ohio State $	7	–	0	–	0	10	–	0	–	0
No. 9 Wisconsin	5	–	2	–	0	7	–	2	–	0
No. 15 Michigan	5	–	2	–	0	6	–	3	–	0
Minnesota	4	–	2	–	0	7	–	2	–	0
Iowa	4	–	3	–	0	5	–	4	–	0
Purdue	3	–	3	–	0	5	–	3	–	1
Indiana	2	–	4	–	0	3	–	6	–	0
Michigan State	1	–	5	–	0	3	–	6	–	0
Northwestern	1	–	5	–	0	2	–	7	–	0
Illinois	0	–	6	–	0	1	–	8	–	0
$ – Conference champion; Rankings from AP Poll

The 1954 Illinois Fighting Illini football team was an American football team that represented the University of Illinois as a member of the Big Ten Conference during the 1954 Big Ten season. In their 13th year under head coach Ray Eliot, the Fighting Illini compiled a 1–8 record (0–6 in conference games), finished in last place in the Big Ten, and were outscored by a total of 180 to 103.

Guard Jan Smid was selected as a second-team player on the 1954 All-Big Ten Conference football team. Center Jack Chamblin was selected as the team's most valuable player.

The team played its home games at Memorial Stadium in Champaign, Illinois.

== Schedule ==
Date	Opponent	Rank	Site	Result	Attendance
September 25	Penn State*	No. 6	Memorial Stadium; Champaign, IL	L 12–14	54,094
October 2	at Stanford*		Stanford Stadium; Stanford, CA	L 2–12	30,000
October 9	No. 10 Ohio State		Memorial Stadium; Champaign, IL (Illibuck)	L 7–40	69,567
October 16	at No. 11 Minnesota		Memorial Stadium; Minneapolis, MN	L 6–19	63,339
October 23	Syracuse*		Memorial Stadium; Champaign, IL	W 34–6	41,820
October 30	at No. 9 Purdue		Ross–Ade Stadium; West Lafayette, IN (rivalry)	L 14–28	47,000
November 6	at Michigan		Michigan Stadium; Ann Arbor, MI (rivalry)	L 7–14	58,777
November 13	No. 14 Wisconsin		Memorial Stadium; Champaign, IL	L 14–27	71,119
November 20	Northwestern		Memorial Stadium; Champaign, IL (rivalry)	L 7–20	39,186
*Non-conference game; Rankings from AP Poll released prior to the game
