= Frank McDonald (American football) =

American football player

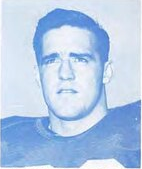
- McDonald in 1954

No. 72
- Position: End

Personal information
- Born: c. 1933 (age 92–93); New Jersey, U.S.
- Listed height: 6 ft 2 in (1.88 m)
- Listed weight: 195 lb (88 kg)

Career information
- High school: Nutley (NJ)
- College: Miami (FL)
- NFL draft: 1955: 7th round, 75th overall pick

Career history
- Hamilton Tiger-Cats (1955)

Awards and highlights
- First-team All-American (1954)

Frank McDonald (born c. 1933) is an American former football player. McDonald grew up in Nutley, New Jersey, and attended the University of Miami. He played college football at the end position for the Miami Hurricanes football team. He was selected by the Associated Press and the Football Writers Association of America as a first-team player on their respective 1954 College Football All-America Teams. He was inducted into the University of Miami Sports Hall of Fame in 1974.
