= Dick Brubaker =

American football player (born 1932)

No. 87, 88
- Position: End

Personal information
- Born: January 2, 1932 (age 94); Cleveland, Ohio, U.S.
- Listed height: 6 ft 0 in (1.83 m)
- Listed weight: 202 lb (92 kg)

Career information
- High school: Shaker Heights (OH)
- College: Ohio Wesleyan (1951); Ohio State (1953–1954)
- NFL draft: 1955: 15th round, 170th overall pick

Career history
- Chicago Cardinals (1955, 1957); Buffalo Bills (1960)

Awards and highlights
- National champion (1954)

Career NFL/AFL statistics
- Receptions: 13
- Receiving Yards: 200
- Receiving touchdowns: 1
- Stats at Pro Football Reference

Carl Richard Brubaker (born January 2, 1932) is an American former professional football player who was an end with the Chicago Cardinals of the National Football League (NFL) and Buffalo Bills of the American Football League (AFL). He played college football for the Ohio Wesleyan Battling Bishops and Ohio State Buckeyes. Dick was co-captain with John Borton for the 1954 Ohio State Football national championship under first-time champion coach Woody Hayes.
