= 1954 All-America college football team =

Official list of the best college football players of 1954

The 1954 All-America college football team is composed of college football players who were selected as All-Americans by various organizations and writers that chose All-America college football teams in 1954. The eight selectors recognized by the NCAA as "official" for the 1954 season are (1) the All-America Board (AAB), (2) the American Football Coaches Association (AFCA), (3) the Associated Press (AP), (4) the Football Writers Association of America (FWAA), (5) the International News Service (INS), (6) the Newspaper Enterprise Association (NEA), (7) the Sporting News (SN), and (8) the United Press (UP).

Wisconsin's fullback Alan Ameche won the Heisman Trophy in 1954 as the best player in college football and was a unanimous first-team selection by all eight official selectors. Three other players were unanimous choices among the official selectors: Notre Dame's quarterback Ralph Guglielmi; Ohio State's halfback Howard "Hopalong" Cassady; and Arkansas' guard Bud Brooks.

== Consensus All-Americans ==
For the year 1954, the NCAA recognizes eight published All-American teams as "official" designations for purposes of its consensus determinations. The following chart identifies the NCAA-recognized consensus All-Americans and displays which first-team designations they received.

Name	Position	School	Number	Official	Other
Ralph Guglielmi	Quarterback	Notre Dame	8/8	AAB, AFCA, AP, FWAA, INS, NEA, SN, UP	CP, WC
Howard Cassady	Halfback	Ohio State	8/8	AAB, AFCA, AP, FWAA, INS, NEA, SN, UP	CP, WC
Alan Ameche	Fullback	Wisconsin	8/8	AAB, AFCA, AP, FWAA, INS, NEA, SN, UP	CP, WC
Bud Brooks	Guard	Arkansas	8/8	AAB, AFCA, AP, FWAA, INS, NEA, SN, UP	WC
Jack Ellena	Tackle	UCLA	7/8	AAB, AFCA, AP, INS, NEA, SN, UP	CP, WC
Dicky Moegle	Halfback	Rice	7/8	AAB, AFCA, AP, FWAA, NEA, SN, UP	WC
Kurt Burris	Center	Oklahoma	6/8	AFCA, AP, FWAA, NEA, SN, UP	CP, WC
Max Boydston	End	Oklahoma	6/8	AAB, AFCA, FWAA, INS, SN, UP	WC
Ron Beagle	End	Navy	6/8	AAB, AP, FWAA, INS, NEA, SN	WC
Cal Jones	Guard	Iowa	5/8	AAB, FWAA, NEA, SN, UP	CP, WC
Sid Fournet	Tackle	LSU	5/8	AFCA, FWAA, INS, NEA, UP	WC

== All-American selections for 1954 ==
=== Ends ===
- Max Boydston, Oklahoma (AAB, AFCA, AP-2, FWAA, INS-1, NEA-2, SN, UP-1, CP-3, WC)
- Ron Beagle, Navy (AAB, AP-1, FWAA, INS-1, NEA-1, SN, UP-2, CP-2, WC)
- Don Holleder, Army (AFCA, INS-2, NEA-1, UP-1, CP-1)
- Frank McDonald, Miami (Fla.) (AP-1, FWAA, NEA-3)
- Dean Dugger, Ohio State (FWAA, INS-2, NEA-2, UP-2, CP-2)
- Ron Kramer, Michigan (AP-3, INS-2, UP-3, CP-1)
- Bill Walker, Maryland (AP-2)
- Jim Pyburn, Auburn (AP-3 INS-2)
- Dave Dickerson, Ole Miss (NEA-3)
- John Kerr, Purdue (CP-3)
- Dan Shannon, Notre Dame (UP-3)

=== Tackles ===
- Jack Ellena, UCLA (AAB, AFCA, AP-1, INS-1, NEA-1, SN, UP-1, CP-1, WC)
- Sid Fournet, LSU (AFCA, AP-2, FWAA, INS-1, NEA-1, UP-1, CP-2, WC)
- Frank Varrichione, Notre Dame (AP-3, INS-2, NEA-3, SN, UP-2, CP-1)
- Rex Boggan, Mississippi (AP-1)
- Darris McCord, Tennessee (FWAA)
- Art Walker, Michigan (AAB, FWAA, NEA-3, UP-3)
- Jim Ray Smith, Baylor (AP-2, UP-2)
- Tom Jones, Miami (OH) (INS-2, NEA-2, CP-3)
- Bob Bartholomew, Wake Forest (NEA-2)
- Eldred Kraemer, Pitt (INS-2, CP-2)
- Dick Hilinski, Ohio State (AP-3)
- Bruce Bosley, West Virginia (CP-3)
- Francis Machinsky, Ohio State (UP-3)

=== Guards ===
- Bud Brooks, Arkansas (AAB, AFCA, AP-1, FWAA, INS-1, NEA-1, SN, UP-1, CP-2, WC)
- Cal Jones, Iowa (College Football Hall of Fame) (AAB, AP-2, FWAA, INS-2, NEA-1, SN, UP-1, CP-1, WC)
- Tom Bettis, Purdue (FWAA, INS-1, NEA-2, UP-2, CP-1)
- Ralph Chesnauskas, Army (AP-1, UP-3)
- Jim Salsbury, UCLA (AFCA, AP-3, FWAA, INS-2, NEA-2, UP-2, CP-3)
- Frank Mincevich, South Carolina (FWAA)
- William Meigs, Harvard (AP-2)
- Gene Lamone, West Virginia (AP-3, NEA-3, CP-2)
- Ken Paul, Rice (NEA-3)
- Jan Smid, Illinois (CP-3)
- Franklin Brooks, Georgia Tech (UP-3)

=== Centers ===
- Kurt Burris, Oklahoma (AFCA, AP-1, FWAA, INS-2, NEA-1, SN, UP-1, CP-1, WC)
- Hal Easterwood, Mississippi State (AP-2, FWAA, INS-2, NEA-2)
- Matt Hazeltine, California (INS-1, UP-3)
- Hugh Pitts, TCU (CP-2)
- Leon Cunningham, South Carolina (AP-3, NEA-3)
- Larry Morris, Georgia Tech (UP-2, CP-3)

=== Quarterbacks ===
- Ralph Guglielmi, Notre Dame (AAB, AFCA, AP-1, FWAA, INS-1, NEA-1, SN, UP-1, CP-1, WC)
- Paul Larson, California (AP-2, FWAA, INS-2, NEA-2, UP-2, CP-3)
- George Shaw, Oregon (AP-3, INS-2, NEA-3, UP-2)
- Pete Vann, Army (INS-2, UP-3, CP-2)
- Len Dawson, Purdue (AP-3, UP-3)
- Buddy Leake, Oklahoma (CP-3)

=== Halfbacks ===
- Howard Cassady, (College Football Hall of Fame)Ohio State (AAB, AFCA, AP-1, FWAA, INS-1, NEA-1, SN, UP-1, CP-1, WC)
- Dicky Moegle, Rice (AAB, AFCA, AP-1, FWAA, INS-2, NEA-1, SN, UP-1, CP-2, WC)
- Tommy Bell, Army (FWAA, INS-1, NEA-2)
- Lenny Moore, Penn State (AP-3, CP-1, NEA-2, UP-3)
- Bob McNamara, Minnesota (AP-2, FWAA, INS-2, NEA-3, UP-2, CP-3)
- Frank Bernardi, Colorado (AP-2)
- Primo Villanueva, UCLA (UP-2)
- Corky Tharp, Alabama (INS-2)
- Corky Taylor, Kansas State (INS-2)
- Bob Watkins, Ohio State (CP-2)
- Robert A. Pascal, Duke (AP-3)
- Carroll Hardy, Colorado (NEA-3)
- Hubert Bobo, Ohio State (CP-3)

=== Fullbacks ===
- Alan Ameche, Wisconsin (AAB, AFCA, AP-1, FWAA, INS-1, NEA-1, SN, UP-1, CP-1, WC)
- Bob Davenport, UCLA (AP-2, FWAA, INS-2, NEA-2, UP-3, CP-2)
- Henry Moore, Arkansas (NEA-3)

== Key ==
- **Bold** – Consensus All-American
- -1 – First-team selection
- -2 – Second-team selection
- -3 – Third-team selection

=== Official selectors ===
- AAB = All-America Board
- AFCA = American Football Coaches Association, published in Collier's Magazine
- AP = Associated Press: "The team was chosen on the recommendations of 11 AP regional all-America boards plus individual recommendations received from more than 500 AP member newspapers and radio stations, and is based on full reports for the entire season."
- FWAA = Football Writers Association of America selected for Look magazine
- INS = International News Service: "selected by INS grid experts throughout the nation"
- NEA = Newspaper Enterprise Association selected by an "electorate composed of coaches and football writers"
- SN = The Sporting News
- UP = United Press, "chosen by the ballots of 308 sports writers and broadcasters in all sections of the country"

=== Other selectors ===
- CP = Central Press Association: selected by captains of college football teams
- WC = Walter Camp Football Foundation

== See also ==
- 1954 All-Atlantic Coast Conference football team
- 1954 All-Big Seven Conference football team
- 1954 All-Big Ten Conference football team
- 1954 All-Pacific Coast Conference football team
- 1954 All-SEC football team
- 1954 All-Southern Conference football team
- 1954 All-Southwest Conference football team
