= 1954 Northwestern Wildcats football team =

American college football season

1954 Northwestern Wildcats football
- Conference: Big Ten Conference
- Record: 2–7 (1–5 Big Ten)
- Head coach: Bob Voigts (8th season)
- MVP: Ziggie Niepokoj
- Captains: Joe Collier; Bob Lauter
- Home stadium: Dyche Stadium

1954 Big Ten Conference football standings
	Conf.					Overall
Team	W		L		T	W		L		T
No. 1 Ohio State $	7	–	0	–	0	10	–	0	–	0
No. 9 Wisconsin	5	–	2	–	0	7	–	2	–	0
No. 15 Michigan	5	–	2	–	0	6	–	3	–	0
Minnesota	4	–	2	–	0	7	–	2	–	0
Iowa	4	–	3	–	0	5	–	4	–	0
Purdue	3	–	3	–	0	5	–	3	–	1
Indiana	2	–	4	–	0	3	–	6	–	0
Michigan State	1	–	5	–	0	3	–	6	–	0
Northwestern	1	–	5	–	0	2	–	7	–	0
Illinois	0	–	6	–	0	1	–	8	–	0
$ – Conference champion; Rankings from AP Poll

The 1954 Northwestern Wildcats team represented Northwestern University during the 1954 Big Ten Conference football season. In their eighth year under head coach Bob Voigts, the Wildcats compiled a 2–7 record (1–5 against Big Ten Conference opponents), finished in a tie for eighth place in the Big Ten, and were outscored by their opponents by a combined total of 142 to 101.

== Schedule ==
Date	Opponent	Site	Result	Attendance
September 25	Iowa State*	Dyche Stadium; Evanston, IL	W 27–14	32,056
October 2	No. 9 USC*	Dyche Stadium; Evanston, IL	L 7–12	30,725
October 9	at No. 18 Minnesota	Memorial Stadium; Minneapolis, MN	L 7–26	53,663
October 16	Michigan	Dyche Stadium; Evanston, IL (rivalry)	L 0–7	32,972
October 23	at Pittsburgh	Pitt Stadium; Pittsburgh, PA	L 7–14	28,862
October 30	No. 1 Ohio State	Dyche Stadium; Evanston, IL	L 7–14	41,650
November 6	at No. 16 Wisconsin	Camp Randall Stadium; Madison, WI	L 13–34	53,131
November 13	Indiana	Dyche Stadium; Evanston, IL	L 13–14	25,856
November 20	at Illinois	Memorial Stadium; Champaign, IL (rivalry)	W 20–7	39,186
*Non-conference game; Rankings from AP Poll released prior to the game
