= Joe Amstutz =

American football player (1934–2021)

No. 52
- Position: Center

Personal information
- Born: October 12, 1934; Toledo, Ohio, U.S.
- Died: September 26, 2021 (aged 86); California, U.S.
- Listed height: 6 ft 5 in (1.96 m)
- Listed weight: 264 lb (120 kg)

Career information
- High school: Central Catholic (Toledo)
- College: Indiana (1953–1956)
- NFL draft: 1957: 6th round, 63rd overall pick

Career history
- Cleveland Browns (1957)

Awards and highlights
- Second-team All-Big Ten (1955)

Career NFL statistics
- Games played: 11
- Games started: 2
- Stats at Pro Football Reference

Gerald Joseph Amstutz (October 12, 1934 – September 26, 2021) was an American professional football center. He played for the Cleveland Browns in 1957. Amstutz died on September 26, 2021, at the age of 86.
