= Fred Baer =

American football player (1932–2007)

- Fred Baer, 1954

No. 30
- Position: Fullback

Personal information
- Born: July 2, 1932
- Died: March 21, 2007 (aged 74)
- Listed height: 5 ft 11 in (1.80 m)
- Listed weight: 188 lb (85 kg)

Career information
- High school: Oak Park (IL) Fenwick
- College: Michigan (1952–1954)

Awards and highlights
- MVP, 1954 Michigan football team; Chicago Catholic League Hall of Fame

Frederick Norman Baer Jr. (July 2, 1932 – March 21, 2007) was an American football player. He played at the fullback position for the University of Michigan from 1952 to 1954. He was chosen as the Most Valuable Player on the 1954 Michigan Wolverines football team.

== Early life ==
Baer's home town was La Grange, Illinois. He attended Fenwick High School in Oak Park, Illinois. He played fullback for the Fenwick Friars in the Chicago Catholic League during the 1949 and 1950 football seasons; in 1949, he played in the same backfield with 1953 Heisman Trophy winner Johnny Lattner. Baer and Lattner were both later inducted in the Chicago Catholic League Hall of Fame.

== University of Michigan ==
Baer enrolled at Michigan in 1951. In May 1952, the Associated Press wrote that Baer "sparkled" in spring practice, leading Michigan head coach Bennie Oosterbaan to say, "He's going to be a real football player. I don't know if he'll be ready by fall but he could be." As a sophomore in 1952, Baer started three games at fullback, but was used principally as a backup for Dick Balzhiser and Bob Hurley during the 1952 and 1953 seasons. He started six games at fullback for the 1954 Wolverines. Baer's best game for the Wolverines came in a 34-0 win over Minnesota on October 23, 1954, as he gained 94 rushing yards on 17 carries (5.5 yards per carry) and scored two touchdowns. The following week against Indiana, he rushed for 92 yards on 22 carries (4.2 yards per carry) and scored one touchdown. In his final game for Michigan, he gained 75 yards and averaged 6.3 yards per carry against Ohio State. Baer played for the Wolverines on defense as well as offense and was considered "a vicious tacker and a hard runner." After the 1954 season, Baer was selected as the Most Valuable Player on the 1954 Michigan football team. He was also selected to play in the Blue-Gray All-Star Football Classic. He scored the winning touchdown for the blue team on a fourth-quarter touchdown pass from Missouri's Vic Eaton.

Baer graduated from Michigan in 1955 with a bachelor of arts degree in history.

== Professional football ==
Baer was selected by the Green Bay Packers in the 14th round (161st overall pick) of the 1955 NFL draft. He signed with the Packers in February 1955.

== Death ==
Baer died in March 2007 at age 74; he was a resident of La Grange, Illinois at the time of his death.
