= 1954 Indiana Hoosiers football team =

American college football season

1954 Indiana Hoosiers football
- Conference: Big Ten Conference
- Record: 3–6 (2–4 Big Ten)
- Head coach: Bernie Crimmins (3rd season)
- MVP: Florian Helinski
- Captain: Bob Skoronski
- Home stadium: Memorial Stadium

1954 Big Ten Conference football standings
	Conf.					Overall
Team	W		L		T	W		L		T
No. 1 Ohio State $	7	–	0	–	0	10	–	0	–	0
No. 9 Wisconsin	5	–	2	–	0	7	–	2	–	0
No. 15 Michigan	5	–	2	–	0	6	–	3	–	0
Minnesota	4	–	2	–	0	7	–	2	–	0
Iowa	4	–	3	–	0	5	–	4	–	0
Purdue	3	–	3	–	0	5	–	3	–	1
Indiana	2	–	4	–	0	3	–	6	–	0
Michigan State	1	–	5	–	0	3	–	6	–	0
Northwestern	1	–	5	–	0	2	–	7	–	0
Illinois	0	–	6	–	0	1	–	8	–	0
$ – Conference champion; Rankings from AP Poll

The 1954 Indiana Hoosiers football team represented the Indiana Hoosiers in the 1954 Big Ten Conference football season. The Hoosiers played their home games at Memorial Stadium in Bloomington, Indiana. The team was coached by Bernie Crimmins, in his third year as head coach of the Hoosiers.

== Schedule ==
Date	Opponent	Site	Result	Attendance	Source
September 25	at Ohio State	Ohio Stadium; Columbus, OH	L 0–28	72,703	
October 2	Pacific (CA)*	Memorial Stadium; Bloomington, IN	W 34–6	18,000–23,648	
October 9	Michigan State	Memorial Stadium; Bloomington, IN (rivalry)	L 14–21	27,411	
October 16	at Missouri*	Memorial Stadium; Columbia, MO	L 14–20	22,972	
October 23	Iowa	Memorial Stadium; Bloomington, IN	L 14–27	30,789	
October 30	at No. 11 Michigan	Michigan Stadium; Ann Arbor, MI	W 13–9	49,817	
November 6	Miami (OH)*	Memorial Stadium; Bloomington, IN	L 0–6	24,563	
November 13	at Northwestern	Dyche Stadium; Evanston, IL	W 14–13	25,856	
November 20	at Purdue	Ross–Ade Stadium; West Lafayette, IM (Old Oaken Bucket)	L 7–13	39,424–44,000	
*Non-conference game; Rankings from AP Poll released prior to the game

== 1955 NFL draftees ==
Player	Position	Round	Pick	NFL club
Nate Borden	End	25	293	Green Bay Packers
