= Lou Baldacci =

American football player (born 1934)

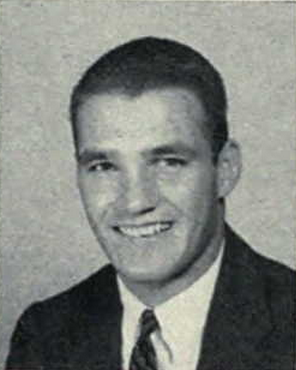

No. 27
- Position: Halfback

Personal information
- Born: December 17, 1934 (age 91); Richmond, Virginia, U.S.
- Listed height: 6 ft 2 in (1.88 m)
- Listed weight: 200 lb (91 kg)

Career information
- High school: St. Vincent–St. Mary (Akron, Ohio)
- College: Michigan
- NFL draft: 1956: 10th round, 111th overall pick

Career history
- Pittsburgh Steelers (1956)

Career NFL statistics
- Rushing yards: 140
- Rushing average: 4.5
- Receptions: 5
- Receiving yards: 62
- Punts: 26
- Punting yards: 1,010
- Stats at Pro Football Reference

Louis Granville Baldacci (born December 17, 1934) is an American former professional football player who was a halfback for the Pittsburgh Steelers of the National Football League (NFL). He played college football for the Michigan Wolverines from 1953 to 1955 and was the starting quarterback for their 1953 and 1954 teams. He was selected by the Steelers in the 1956 NFL draft and played 10 games in the 1956 season.

== Early life ==
Baldacci was born in Richmond, Virginia, in 1934. He attended St. Vincent High School in Akron, Ohio.

== University of Michigan ==
Baldacci enrolled at the University of Michigan in 1952 and played for the Wolverines from 1953 to 1955.

=== 1953 season ===
As a sophomore in 1953, Baldacci was the starting quarterback for all nine games played by Michigan. The 1953 team finished with a record of 6-3 and was ranked No. 19 in the final UPI poll and No. 20 in the final AP poll. Baldacci had his best game as a forward passer in a 14-13 victory over Iowa on October 10, 1953. He completed 7 of 11 passes for 100 yards, including a 31-yard completion to Ed Hickey. Baldacci also kicked a 38-yard field goal against Illinois in 1953, breaking the prior record set by Tom Harmon in 1940; Baldacci's record was broken in 1961 by Doug Bickle.

=== 1954 season ===
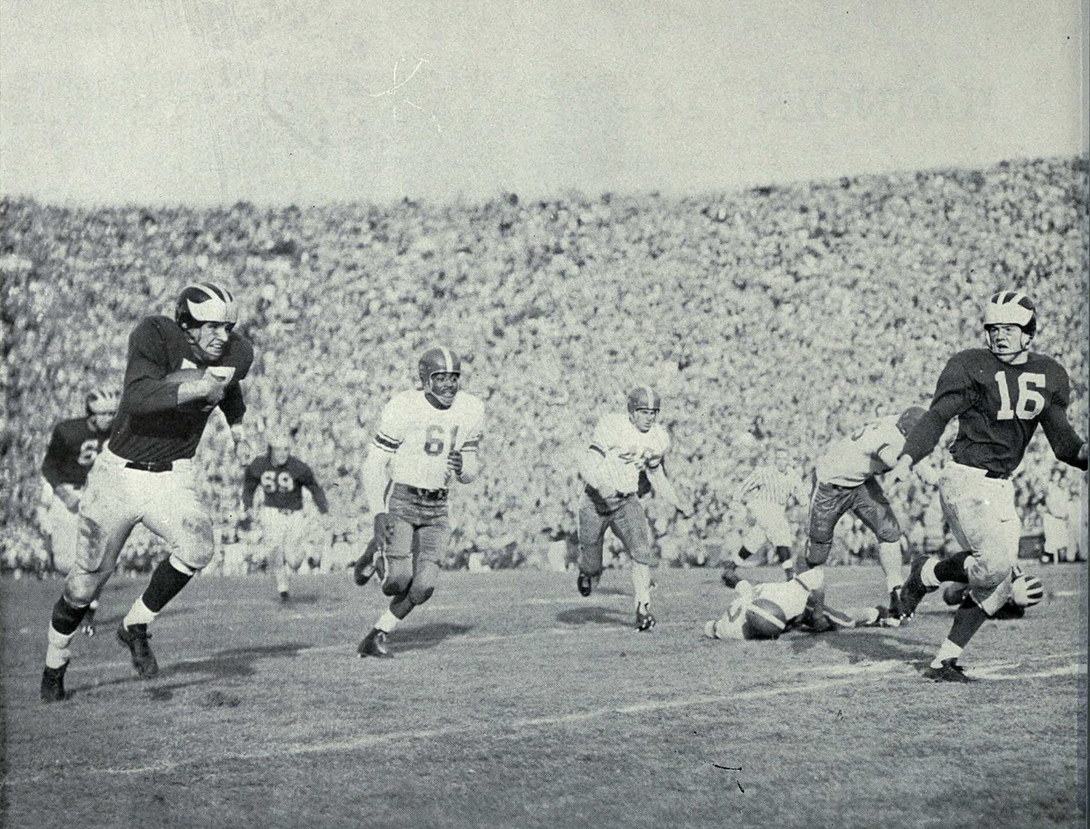
Baldacci's 63-yard TD completion against Michigan State

As a junior in 1954, Baldacci split his time between the quarterback and fullback positions, playing in 309 of 540 minutes over the course of the nine-game season. He started five games at quarterback and one game at fullback for a Michigan team that again finished with a 6-3 record. The 1954 team was ranked No. 15 in both the final UPI and AP polls. In the 1954 season opener, Baldacci scored both of Michigan's touchdowns in a 14-0 win over Washington. In November 1954, Baldacci led Michigan to a 33-7 win over the defending 1954 Rose Bowl champions from Michigan State. Baldacci scored Michigan's first touchdown on a four-yard run and later caught a 63-yard pass from Dan Cline to set up another touchdown.

=== 1955 season ===
As a senior in 1955, Baldacci moved to the fullback position, starting seven of nine games for the Wolverines. The 1955 team improved to 7-2 and were ranked No. 12 in the final AP poll and No. 13 in the final UPI poll. In a 42-7 win over Missouri in September 1955, Baldacci had one of the best games of his career. He had two rushing touchdowns and also threw two passes, both of them completed for touchdowns. His best rushing total was 65 yards on 13 carries against Indiana in November 1955.

After the 1955 season, Baldacci was invited to play in two post-season all-star games. He played in the 1955 Blue-Gray All-Star Football Classic and the 1956 Senior Bowl. He scored the first touchdown for the Blue team in a 20-19 loss to the Gray team.

=== Career statistics ===
During his three years playing with the Wolverines, Baldacci completed 31 of 69 passes for 398 yards, 3 touchdowns and 8 interceptions. He also gained 352 yards rushing on 134 carries and 10 rushing touchdowns. He also caught 16 passes for 269 yards and 2 receiving touchdowns.

== Pittsburgh Steelers ==
Baldacci was selected 111th overall in the tenth round by the Pittsburgh Steelers in the 1956 NFL draft and signed with the Steelers in July 1956. Baldacci played in ten games as a halfback for the Steelers during the 1956 NFL season. He was part of an all-Michigan backfield for Pittsburgh, joining former Michigan teammate Lowell Perry, University of Detroit star Ted Marchibroda and Michigan State star Lynn Chandnois. In November 1956, Baldacci's "hard-hitting" play was credited with powering the Steelers to a 14-7 upset victory over the Chicago Cardinals.

== Later years and family ==
Baldacci was married in December 1956 to Linda Anne Landsnaes at St. Hugo's Church in Bloomfield Hills, Michigan.

Baldacci entered the United States Air Force in 1957. He played with an Air Force football team at Hamilton Air Force Base and was selected to the 1958 All-Air Force Football Team.

Baldacci is a grandfather to 5 children and the great-grandfather to 7 children.
