= Dean Dugger =

American football player (1933–2000)

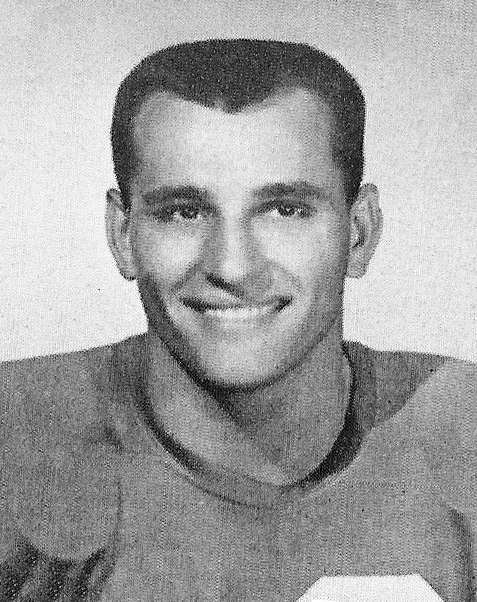
- Dugger from the 1953 Makio

Profile
- Position: End

Personal information
- Born: September 18, 1933; Pennsylvania, U.S.
- Died: March 5, 2000 (aged 66); Columbus, Ohio, U.S.

Career information
- College: Ohio State
- NFL draft: 1955: 4th round, 46th overall pick

Career history
- Philadelphia Eagles (1955)*
- * Offseason or practice squad member only

Awards and highlights
- National champion (1954); First-team All-American (1954); First-team All-Big Ten (1954)

Dean Alan Dugger (September 18, 1933 – March 5, 2000) was an American football player.

Dugger was born in Philadelphia in 1933 and attended Stonewall Jackson High School in Charleston, West Virginia.

He attended the Ohio State University and played college football at the end position for the Ohio State Buckeyes football team from 1952 to 1954. He was selected by the Football Writers Association of America (FWAA) as a first-team player on its 1954 College Football All-America Team. He was also rated as one of the two best ends in the Midwest, and selected by the Associated Press as a first-team end on the 1954 All-Big Ten Conference football team.

He was drafted by the Philadelphia Eagles with the 46th pick in the 1955 NFL Draft. He was placed on waivers by the Eagles on September 15.

He was the brother of Jack Dugger.
