= Dick Murley =

American football player (born 1933)

No. 68, 79
- Position: Offensive tackle

Personal information
- Born: August 1, 1933; Richmond, Indiana, U.S.
- Died: March 27, 2020 (aged 86); Ada Township, Michigan, U.S.
- Listed height: 6 ft 0 in (1.83 m)
- Listed weight: 247 lb (112 kg)

Career information
- High school: Richmond
- College: Purdue (1954–1955)
- NFL draft: 1956: 4th round, 39th overall pick

Career history
- Pittsburgh Steelers (1956); Philadelphia Eagles (1956)

Awards and highlights
- Second-team All-Big Ten (1955)

Career NFL statistics
- Games played: 7
- Games started: 2
- Stats at Pro Football Reference

Richard Allen Murley (August 1, 1933 – March 27, 2020) was an American professional football player who played for the Pittsburgh Steelers and Philadelphia Eagles of the National Football League (NFL). He played college football at Purdue University.

Murley died on March 27, 2020, at the age of 86.
