= Francis Machinsky =

American gridiron football player (1934–2014)

Frank Machinsky
Profile
- Positions: Tackle, Guard

Personal information
- Born: September 15, 1934; New Salem, Pennsylvania, U.S.
- Died: September 5, 2014 (aged 79); Columbus, Ohio, U.S.
- Listed height: 6 ft 0 in (1.83 m)
- Listed weight: 215 lb (98 kg)

Career information
- College: Ohio State

Career history
- 1956: Toronto Argonauts

Awards and highlights
- Second-team All-American (1955); Third-team All-American (1954); 2× First-team All-Big Ten (1954, 1955)

Francis C. "Moose" Machinsky (September 15, 1934 – September 5, 2014) was an American gridiron football player who played for the Toronto Argonauts. He played college football at Ohio State University. He was named an all-star for the 1956 CFL season. He is a member of the Ohio State University Hall of Fame and Fayette County, Pennsylvania Sports Hall of Fame.
