= Dave Leggett =

American football player (1933–2013)

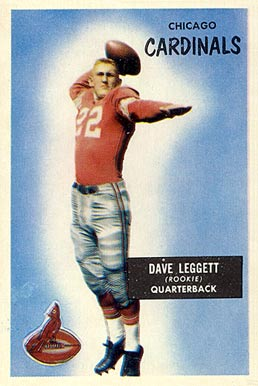
- Leggett on a 1955 Bowman football card

No. 7
- Positions: Quarterback, defensive back

Personal information
- Born: September 18, 1933; New Philadelphia, Ohio, U.S.
- Died: March 26, 2013 (aged 79); Colorado Springs, Colorado, U.S.
- Listed height: 6 ft 2 in (1.88 m)
- Listed weight: 198 lb (90 kg)

Career information
- High school: New Philadelphia
- College: Ohio State (1951–1954)
- NFL draft: 1955: 7th round, 74th overall pick

Career history
- Chicago Cardinals (1955)

Awards and highlights
- National champion (1954); Second-team All-Big Ten (1954)

Career NFL statistics
- Passing yards: 0
- TD–INT: 0-0
- Passer rating: 39.6
- Stats at Pro Football Reference

William David Leggett (September 18, 1933 – March 26, 2013) was a National Football League (NFL) quarterback. He played collegiately at Ohio State University from 1952–1954. In 1954, he led Ohio State to an undefeated 10–0 season and a berth in the Rose Bowl, where Ohio State defeated USC and Leggett was named MVP. He was drafted by the Chicago Cardinals in the 7th round (74th overall) of the 1955 NFL draft.

Leggett was most famous for his play in the 1954 Michigan game. Ohio State's undefeated season was on the line, with the score tied 7–7 in the fourth quarter. Michigan was on the Ohio State one yard line with a fourth down and went for it. Michigan pitched the ball to the right and on defense Leggett was a great safety and it was only him and the Michigan ball carrier at the end zone and as the Michigan back leaped for the end zone Leggett went for his legs and flipped the Michigan man over to stop him short of the end zone. With the ball on Ohio State's own one-yard-line, Leggett led the Buckeyes on a drive for the eventual game-winning touchdown.

Leggett, besides being the most valuable player in that 1955 Rose Bowl win, lettered for coach Woody Hayes and the Buckeyes in 1952, 1953 and 1954.

After graduating from Ohio State in 1955 with a degree in business, Leggett played briefly for the Chicago Cardinals, as mentioned above, before getting called into the military (he was in ROTC at Ohio State). He spent two years in the Air Force and then played football in the Canadian Football League.

He then rejoined the Air Force for a time, and after a three-year military stint in Germany, returned to the United States and spent most of his professional life working in the investment and financial planning business.

Leggett died Tuesday, March 26, 2013 at his home in Colorado Springs, Colorado, after a long illness.
