= 1954 Wisconsin Badgers football team =

American college football season

1954 Wisconsin Badgers football
- Conference: Big Ten Conference

Ranking
- Coaches: No. 10
- AP: No. 9
- Record: 7–2 (5–2 Big Ten)
- Head coach: Ivy Williamson (6th season)
- MVP: Alan Ameche
- Captain: Gary Messner
- Home stadium: Camp Randall Stadium

1954 Big Ten Conference football standings
	Conf.					Overall
Team	W		L		T	W		L		T
No. 1 Ohio State $	7	–	0	–	0	10	–	0	–	0
No. 9 Wisconsin	5	–	2	–	0	7	–	2	–	0
No. 15 Michigan	5	–	2	–	0	6	–	3	–	0
Minnesota	4	–	2	–	0	7	–	2	–	0
Iowa	4	–	3	–	0	5	–	4	–	0
Purdue	3	–	3	–	0	5	–	3	–	1
Indiana	2	–	4	–	0	3	–	6	–	0
Michigan State	1	–	5	–	0	3	–	6	–	0
Northwestern	1	–	5	–	0	2	–	7	–	0
Illinois	0	–	6	–	0	1	–	8	–	0
$ – Conference champion; Rankings from AP Poll

The 1954 Wisconsin Badgers football team represented the University of Wisconsin in the 1954 Big Ten Conference football season. Led by sixth-year head coach Ivy Williamson, the Badgers compiled an overall record of 7–2 with a mark of 5–2 in conference play, trying for second place in the Big Ten.

Senior Alan Ameche won the Heisman Trophy, becoming the first Badger to win the award. He was a consensus selection to the 1954 College Football All-America Team and received the Chicago Tribune Silver Football, awarded to the Big Ten's best player. Ameche played linebacker on defense along with fullback on offense. In four years as a Badger, he gained 3,212 yards, then the National Collegiate Athletic Association (NCAA) record, scored 25 touchdowns, and averaged 4.8 yards per carry.

== Schedule ==
Date	Opponent	Rank	Site	Result	Attendance	Source
September 25	Marquette*	No. 10	Camp Randall Stadium; Madison, WI	W 52–14	52,819	
October 2	at No. 13 Michigan State	No. 5	Macklin Stadium; East Lansing, MI	W 6–0	51,194	
October 9	No. 11 Rice*	No. 3	Camp Randall Stadium; Madison, WI	W 13–7	52,819	
October 16	No. 5 Purdue	No. 2	Camp Randall Stadium; Madison, WI	W 20–6	53,131	
October 23	at No. 4 Ohio State	No. 2	Ohio Stadium; Columbus, OH	L 14–31	82,636	
October 30	at Iowa	No. 8	Iowa Stadium; Iowa City, IA (rivalry)	L 7–13	52,185	
November 6	Northwestern^{†}	No. 16	Camp Randall Stadium; Madison, WI	W 34–13	53,131	
November 13	at Illinois	No. 14	Memorial Stadium; Champaign, IL	W 27–14	71,119	
November 20	No. 10 Minnesota	No. 17	Camp Randall Stadium; Madison, WI (rivalry)	W 27–0	53,131	
*Non-conference game; ^{†}Homecoming; Rankings from AP Poll released prior to the game

== Awards and honors ==
- Alan Ameche, Heisman Trophy
- Alan Ameche, All-America honors

== Team players in the 1955 NFL draft ==
Player	Position	Round	Pick	NFL club
Alan Ameche	Back	1	3	Baltimore Colts
Jim Temp	End	2	17	Green Bay Packers
Norm Amundsen	Guard	6	65	Green Bay Packers
Ron Locklin	End	6	68	New York Giants
Clarence Bratt	Back	12	143	Chicago Bears
Jerry Cvengros	Tackle	21	247	Los Angeles Rams
Bob Gringrass	Back	27	321	Philadelphia Eagles
