= Ken Vargo =

American gridiron football player (born c. 1934)

Profile
- Position: Linebacker

Personal information
- Born: c. 1934 (age 91–92); Martins Ferry, Ohio, U.S.
- Listed height: 6 ft 0 in (1.83 m)
- Listed weight: 215 lb (98 kg)

Career information
- College: Ohio State
- NFL draft: 1956: 9th round, 106th overall pick

Career history
- 1956–1958: Ottawa Rough Riders

Awards and highlights
- First-team All-Big Ten (1955)

Kenneth Vargo (born c. 1934) is an American gridiron football player who played for the Ottawa Rough Riders. He played college football at Ohio State University. Vargo was selected 106th overall in the ninth round of the 1956 NFL draft by the Chicago Bears, but played instead in the CFL. He was named an all-star for the 1956 CFL season.
