= Frank Gilliam (American football) =

American football player and coach (1934–2023)

Profile
- Position: Offensive End

Personal information
- Born: January 7, 1934; Steubenville, Ohio, U.S.
- Died: April 2, 2023 (aged 89)

Career information
- College: Iowa
- NFL draft: 1957: 7th round, 76th overall pick

Career history

Playing
- 1957–1959: Winnipeg Blue Bombers
- 1960: British Columbia Lions

Coaching
- ?: Iowa (assistant)

Awards and highlights
- 2× Grey Cup champion (1958, 1959); Second-team All-American (1956); First-team All-Big Ten (1956); Second-team All-Big Ten (1954)

Frank Gilliam (January 7, 1934 – April 2, 2023) was an American football player and coach. He played college football for the Iowa Hawkeyes. He later played professionally for several seasons in the Canadian Football League (CFL). After his playing career, he was an assistant coach for Iowa. Gilliam was a member of the University of Iowa’s all-time football team.

== Background ==
Frank Gilliam attended high school in Steubenville, Ohio, and was football teammate with Calvin Jones and Eddie Vincent. Frank was nicknamed "Shag" because of the baggy pants he liked to wear. Gilliam and Vincent committed to play for the Iowa Hawkeyes, while Cal Jones committed to play for Ohio State. However, at the last minute, Jones switched his commitment and decided to accompany Gilliam and Vincent to the University of Iowa. Gilliam, Vincent, and Jones became affectionately known as the "Steubenville Trio".

== Iowa career ==
As a sophomore in 1953, Frank Gilliam, who played the right end position, helped Iowa to an excellent season. Iowa’s final game of that season was against #1 Notre Dame in South Bend. With 2:06 remaining in the game, Gilliam made a diving catch in the end zone to give Iowa a 14–7 lead. But Notre Dame completed a touchdown pass with six seconds to play to salvage a 14–14 tie, thanks in large part to an injury timeout that was granted when two Notre Dame players fell at the same time. The tie cost the Irish the #1 spot in the final AP Poll, dropping them to a distant #2. Iowa rocketed into the AP rankings, finishing the year ninth in the nation and garnering six first-place votes. It was Iowa’s highest ranking since 1939.

In 1954, Iowa finished with a 5–4 record. Before Gilliam’s senior season in 1955, he broke his leg and was forced to sit out for a year. Jones and Vincent played their senior seasons in 1955, with Cal Jones winning the Outland Trophy.

In Gilliam’s senior season of 1956, Iowa had a 9–1 record, winning the Big Ten and a trip to the Rose Bowl for the first time in school history. Frank Gilliam was named a second-team All-American after the season. The happy occasion was marred, however, by the discovery that Gilliam’s close friend, Cal Jones, had died in a plane crash in the mountains of western Canada during a howling windstorm. Frank Gilliam’s final game with the Hawkeyes came in the 1957 Rose Bowl, where Iowa defeated Oregon State, 35–19.

== Professional career ==
Frank Gilliam played for the Winnipeg Blue Bombers of the Canadian Football League for three seasons from 1957–1959. After retiring from professional football, he was a teacher for a few years before becoming an assistant coach to Jerry Burns at the University of Iowa from 1966–1970. Gilliam then joined the Minnesota Vikings, where he was a scout and personnel man for over 36 years. He left the Vikings in 2007, after deciding to pursue other career opportunities.

In 1989, Iowa fans selected an all-time University of Iowa football team during the 100th-anniversary celebration of Iowa football, and Frank Gilliam was selected as a starting end.

== Death ==
Gilliam died on April 2, 2023, at the age of 89.
