= Bob Hobert =

Canadian football player (born 1935)

Profile
- Position: Tackle

Personal information
- Born: June 28, 1935
- Died: November 2, 1992 (aged 57)
- Listed height: 6 ft 0 in (1.83 m)
- Listed weight: 235 lb (107 kg)

Career information
- NFL draft: 1957: 6th round, 73rd overall pick

Career history
- 1958–1964: Winnipeg Blue Bombers

Awards and highlights
- Grey Cup champion (1958); First-team All-American (1956); First-team All-Big Ten (1956); Second-team All-Big Ten (1955)

Robert D. Hobert (June 28, 1935 – November 2, 1992) was a Canadian football player who played for the Winnipeg Blue Bombers. He won the Grey Cup with them in 1958. He played college football at the University of Minnesota.
