= Howard Cassady =

American football player (1934–2019)

Hopalong Cassady
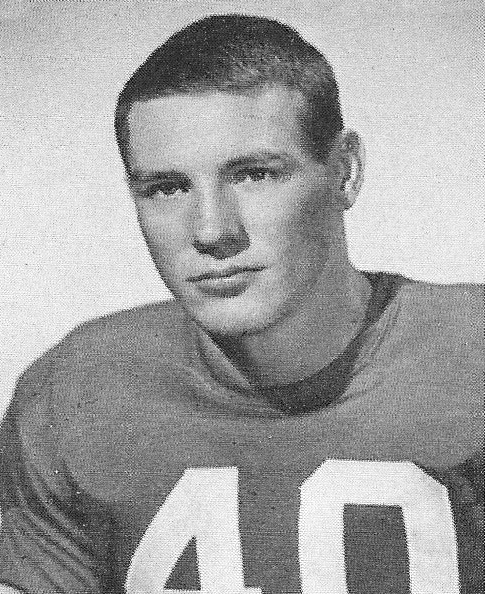
- Cassady c. 1953

No. 40, 41
- Positions: Halfback, split end

Personal information
- Born: March 2, 1934; Columbus, Ohio, U.S.
- Died: September 20, 2019 (aged 85); Tampa, Florida, U.S.
- Listed height: 5 ft 10 in (1.78 m)
- Listed weight: 183 lb (83 kg)

Career information
- High school: Central (Columbus)
- College: Ohio State (1952–1955)
- NFL draft: 1956: 1st round, 3rd overall pick

Career history
- Detroit Lions (1956–1961); Cleveland Browns (1962); Philadelphia Eagles (1962); Detroit Lions (1963)

Awards and highlights
- NFL champion (1957); National champion (1954); Heisman Trophy (1955); Maxwell Award (1955); AP Male Athlete of the Year (1955); 2× SN Player of the Year (1954, 1955); UPI Player of the Year (1955); Chic Harley Award (1955); 2× Unanimous All-American (1954, 1955); Chicago Tribune Silver Football (1955); 2× First-team All-Big Ten (1954, 1955); Second-team All-Big Ten (1953); Ohio State Buckeyes No. 40 retired

Career NFL statistics
- Rushing yards: 1,229
- Rushing average: 3.9
- Rushing touchdowns: 6
- Receptions: 111
- Receiving yards: 1,601
- Receiving touchdowns: 18
- Stats at Pro Football Reference
- College Football Hall of Fame

Howard Albert "Hopalong" Cassady (March 2, 1934 – September 20, 2019) was an American professional football halfback and split end who played in the National Football League (NFL). He played college football for the Ohio State Buckeyes, where he won the Heisman Trophy in 1955. Cassady played in the NFL for eight seasons, seven of them for the Detroit Lions, with whom he won the 1957 NFL Championship Game. He was inducted into the College Football Hall of Fame in 1979.

== Early life ==
Cassady was born in Columbus, Ohio and attended the now closed Central High School.

== College career ==
Cassady played football for the Ohio State Buckeyes from 1952 to 1955. During his college career, he scored 37 touchdowns in 36 games. He played both sides of the ball, and was regarded as an outstanding defensive back. He was twice selected as a unanimous All-American, in 1954 and 1955. The 1954 Buckeyes finished the season 10–0 and won a consensus national championship. That year Cassady finished third in the vote for the Heisman Trophy, behind Alan Ameche of Wisconsin. In 1955, he won the Heisman Trophy (by the largest margin at the time) and the Maxwell Award, and was named the Associated Press Athlete of the Year. During his playing days, he was 5'10" and 170 pounds.

Cassady earned the nickname "Hopalong" during his first game as a freshman for Ohio State. Columbus sportswriters who saw him play said he "hopped all over the field like the performing cowboy", a reference to the fictional character Hopalong Cassidy. In that game, Cassady came off the bench to score three touchdowns in a win over Indiana University.

Cassady held some Ohio State career records for many years following his graduation. He held the career rushing record (2,466 yards) until it was surpassed by Jim Otis in 1969, the career all-purpose yards record (4,403 yards) until surpassed by Archie Griffin in 1974, and the scoring record (222 points) until surpassed by Pete Johnson in 1975.

Cassady also played baseball for Ohio State. He led the team in home runs in 1955, and stolen bases in 1956. He also became a member of the Sigma Chi fraternity there.

He was a member of The Pigskin Club Of Washington, D.C. National Intercollegiate All-American Football Players Honor Roll.

== Professional career ==
Cassady played eight seasons in the National Football League: seven (1956–1961, and 1963) for the Detroit Lions, and one season (1962) split between the Cleveland Browns and the Philadelphia Eagles. In the NFL he was an all-purpose back, playing both receiver and running back and scoring 27 career touchdowns.

== After football ==
After retiring from football, Cassady became an entrepreneur forming a company manufacturing concrete pipe. He then served as a scout for the New York Yankees baseball team, and as the first base coach for their former AAA affiliate, the Columbus Clippers.

His son Craig Cassady played defensive back at Ohio State, and briefly in the NFL for the New Orleans Saints in the 1970s.

Cassady died on September 20, 2019, at his home in Tampa, Florida. He is one of at least 345 NFL players to be diagnosed after death with chronic traumatic encephalopathy (CTE), which is caused by repeated hits to the head.
