= Joe Krupa =

American football player (1933–2011)

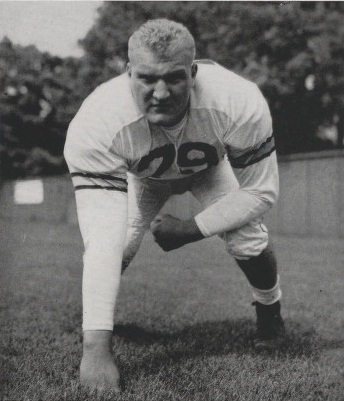
- Krupa from 1955 Purdue yearbook

No. 75
- Position: Defensive tackle

Personal information
- Born: July 6, 1933; Chicago, Illinois, U.S.
- Died: September 13, 2011 (aged 78); Chicago, Illinois, U.S.
- Listed height: 6 ft 2 in (1.88 m)
- Listed weight: 232 lb (105 kg)

Career information
- High school: Weber (Chicago)
- College: Purdue (1952–1955)
- NFL draft: 1956: 2nd round, 17th overall pick

Career history
- Pittsburgh Steelers (1956–1964)

Awards and highlights
- Pro Bowl (1963); First-team All-Big Ten (1955)

Career NFL statistics
- Fumble recoveries: 11
- Sacks: 22.5
- Stats at Pro Football Reference

Joseph S. Krupa Sr. (July 6, 1933 – September 13, 2011) was an American professional football player who was a defensive tackle for nine seasons with the Pittsburgh Steelers of the National Football League (NFL). Krupa was selected to the Pro Bowl after the 1963 season. He played college football for the Purdue Boilermakers. Krupa is a member of the Chicagoland Sports Hall of Fame.
