= Bobby Watkins (running back) =

American football player (born 1932)

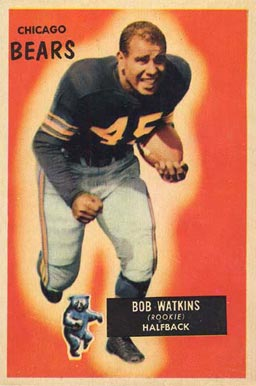
- Watkins on a 1955 Bowman football card

No. 45, 24
- Position: Halfback

Personal information
- Born: March 30, 1932; New Bedford, Massachusetts, U.S.
- Died: September 25, 2022 (aged 90); New Bedford, Massachusetts, U.S.
- Listed height: 5 ft 10 in (1.78 m)
- Listed weight: 198 lb (90 kg)

Career information
- High school: New Bedford
- College: Ohio State (1951–1954)
- NFL draft: 1955: 2nd round, 23rd overall pick

Career history
- Chicago Bears (1955–1957); Chicago Cardinals (1958)

Awards and highlights
- National champion (1954); 2× Second-team All-Big Ten (1953, 1954)

Career NFL statistics
- Rushing yards: 1,058
- Rushing average: 4.4
- Receptions: 15
- Receiving yards: 234
- Total touchdowns: 14
- Stats at Pro Football Reference

Robert Archbald Watkins Jr. (March 30, 1932 – September 25, 2022) was an American professional football halfback who played college football at Ohio State University and professionally in the National Football League (NFL).

== Ohio State ==
Watkins was one of the first black running backs at the Ohio State University. He lettered from 1952 through 1954 and was one of the first recruits of legendary Ohio State football coach Woody Hayes. Hayes shrugged off criticism by some bigoted alumni, insisting he would not consider recruits based on skin color. Watkins was Ohio State's leading rusher in 1953 and leading scorer during the 1954 national championship season.

== NFL ==
Watkins was the 23rd overall pick in the second round of the 1955 NFL draft. He played three years with the Bears before ending his career with the crosstown Chicago Cardinals.

== Professional life ==
Watkins formerly served as a vice president of Seagrams and Sons and was an expert on the American Civil War. He was a guest speaker on many occasions including as the keynote speaker at the Plymouth Teaching American History Grant's culminating celebration.

Watkins served as the Chair of the University of Massachusetts Dartmouth Blue Ribbon Commission on Athletics.

== Death ==
Watkins died in New Bedford, Massachusetts on September 25, 2022, at the age of 90.
