= 1954 Ohio State Buckeyes football team =

American college football season

1954 Ohio State Buckeyes football
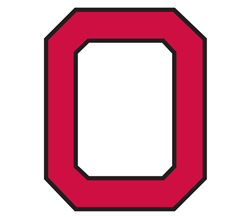

AP Poll national champion Big Ten champion Rose Bowl champion

Rose Bowl, W 20–7 vs. USC
- Conference: Big Ten Conference

Ranking
- Coaches: No. 2
- AP: No. 1
- Record: 10–0 (7–0 Big Ten)
- Head coach: Woody Hayes (4th season)
- Offensive scheme: Heavy run
- Base defense: Multiple
- MVP: Howard Cassady
- Captains: John Borton; Dick Brubaker
- Home stadium: Ohio Stadium

1954 Big Ten Conference football standings
	Conf.					Overall
Team	W		L		T	W		L		T
No. 1 Ohio State $	7	–	0	–	0	10	–	0	–	0
No. 9 Wisconsin	5	–	2	–	0	7	–	2	–	0
No. 15 Michigan	5	–	2	–	0	6	–	3	–	0
Minnesota	4	–	2	–	0	7	–	2	–	0
Iowa	4	–	3	–	0	5	–	4	–	0
Purdue	3	–	3	–	0	5	–	3	–	1
Indiana	2	–	4	–	0	3	–	6	–	0
Michigan State	1	–	5	–	0	3	–	6	–	0
Northwestern	1	–	5	–	0	2	–	7	–	0
Illinois	0	–	6	–	0	1	–	8	–	0
$ – Conference champion; Rankings from AP Poll

The 1954 Ohio State Buckeyes football team represented the Ohio State University in the 1954 Big Ten Conference football season. The team was led by quarterback Dave Leggett and captains John Borton and Dick Brubaker. They were the second national title team in Ohio State football history. They were coached by Hall of Fame coach Woody Hayes. The Buckeyes were awarded the title by the AP Poll and represented the Big Ten Conference in the Rose Bowl.

The Buckeyes finished the 1953 season with a record of 6–3. They were ranked #20 in the preseason AP Poll, but dropped out of the first in-season poll, which was issued before their season opener. However, six weeks later, the Buckeyes had risen to the top of the AP Poll. Their rise from unranked to #1 in six weeks stood as an AP Poll record for 60 years until being broken by Mississippi State in 2014. The Buckeyes defeated six ranked teams to capture their first league title under fourth year Coach Hayes.

Led by their powerful defense, the Bucks beat the #2 Wisconsin Badgers and their eventual Heisman Trophy winner Alan Ameche on an 88-yard interception return by Howard "Hopalong" Cassady, who won the award the following year. The Buckeye defense forced 35 turnovers during the season and allowed only two teams to score more than one touchdown

In their game against the Michigan Wolverines, the Bucks held a goal-line stand and then drove 99 yards for a touchdown. The AP Poll declared the Bucks to be number one while the UPI Coaches Poll opted for the 9–0, Pacific Coast Conference champion the UCLA Bruins. However, because of the "no repeat rule" the Bruins were locked out of the Rose Bowl leaving the Buckeyes to play second place USC.

The 1955 Rose Bowl was played during a rainstorm in poor field conditions. However, Ohio State managed to gain 304 yards and hold the Trojans to only six first downs. USC's only score came on an 86-yard punt return. The team finished 10–0 for the first time in school history.

== Schedule ==
Date	Opponent	Rank	Site	TV	Result	Attendance
September 25	Indiana		Ohio Stadium; Columbus, OH		W 28–0	72,703
October 2	No. 18 California*	No. 14	Ohio Stadium; Columbus, OH		W 21–13	79,524
October 9	at Illinois	No. 10	Memorial Stadium; Champaign, IL (Illibuck)		W 40–7	69,567
October 16	No. 13 Iowa	No. 4	Ohio Stadium; Columbus, OH		W 20–14	82,141
October 23	No. 2 Wisconsin	No. 4	Ohio Stadium; Columbus, OH		W 31–14	82,636
October 30	at Northwestern	No. 1	Dyche Stadium; Evanston, IL		W 14–7	41,650
November 6	No. 20 Pittsburgh*	No. 2	Ohio Stadium; Columbus, OH		W 26–0	80,886
November 13	at Purdue	No. 2	Ross–Ade Stadium; West Lafayette, IN		W 28–6	51,000
November 20	No. 12 Michigan	No. 1	Ohio Stadium; Columbus, OH (rivalry)		W 21–7	78,447
January 1, 1955	vs. No. 17 USC*	No. 1	Rose Bowl; Pasadena, CA (Rose Bowl)	NBC	W 20–7	89,191
*Non-conference game; Rankings from AP Poll released prior to the game

== Game summaries ==
=== Michigan ===
Team Statistics
Statistic	Ohio State	Michigan
Pass Atts.	9	14
Pass Comps.	4	6
Pass Yards	58	74
Yds./Pass	14.5	12.3
Rush Atts.	45	50
Rush Yards	196	229
Yds./Rush	4.4	4.6
Total Yards	254	303
Fumbles Lost	1	2
Interceptions	1	3
Total Turnovers	2	5

Team	1	2	3	4	Total
Michigan	7	0	0	0	7
• Ohio State	0	7	0	14	21

- Date: November 20
- Location: Ohio Stadium
- Game attendance: 82,438
- Game weather: 47 °F (8 °C)

Scoring summary
Q1	MICH	Cline 7 yard rush (Kramer kick)	MICH 0–7
Q2	OSU	Kriss 15 yard pass from Leggett (Weed kick)	tie 7–7
Q4	OSU	Brubaker 8 yard pass from Leggett (Weed kick)	OSU 14–7
Q4	OSU	Cassady 1 yard run (Weed kick)	OSU 21–7

=== Southern California ===
Team Statistics
Statistic	Ohio State	USC
Pass Atts.	11	8
Pass Comps.	6	3
Pass Yards	65	29
Yds./Pass	10.8	9.7
Rush Atts.	69	28
Rush Yards	305	177
Yds./Rush	4.4	6.3
Total Yards	370	206
Fumbles Lost	0	3
Interceptions	1	0
Total Turnovers	1	3

Team	1	2	3	4	Total
USC	0	7	0	0	7
• Ohio State	0	14	0	6	20

- Date: January 1
- Location: Rose Bowl
- Game attendance: 89,191

Scoring summary
Q2	14:25	OSU	Leggett 3 yard rush (Weed kick)	OSU 7–0
Q2	12:55	OSU	Watkins 7 yard pass from Leggett (Watkins kick)	OSU 14–0
Q2	5:37	USC	Dandoy 86 yard punt return (Tsagalakis kick)	OSU 14–7
Q4	6:41	OSU	Harkrader 9 yard run (kick failed)	OSU 20–7

== Coaching staff ==
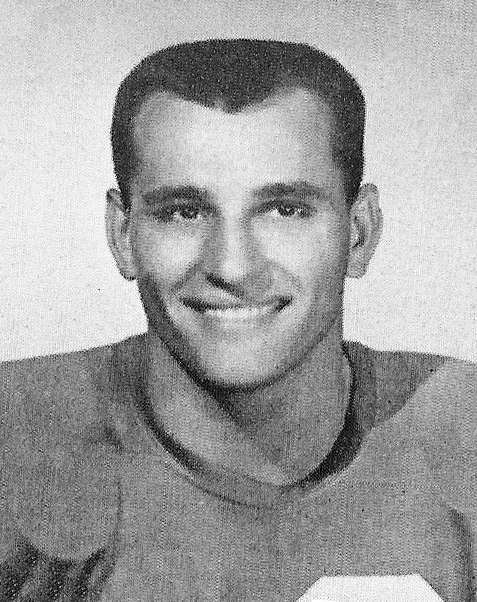
Dean Dugger in 1952

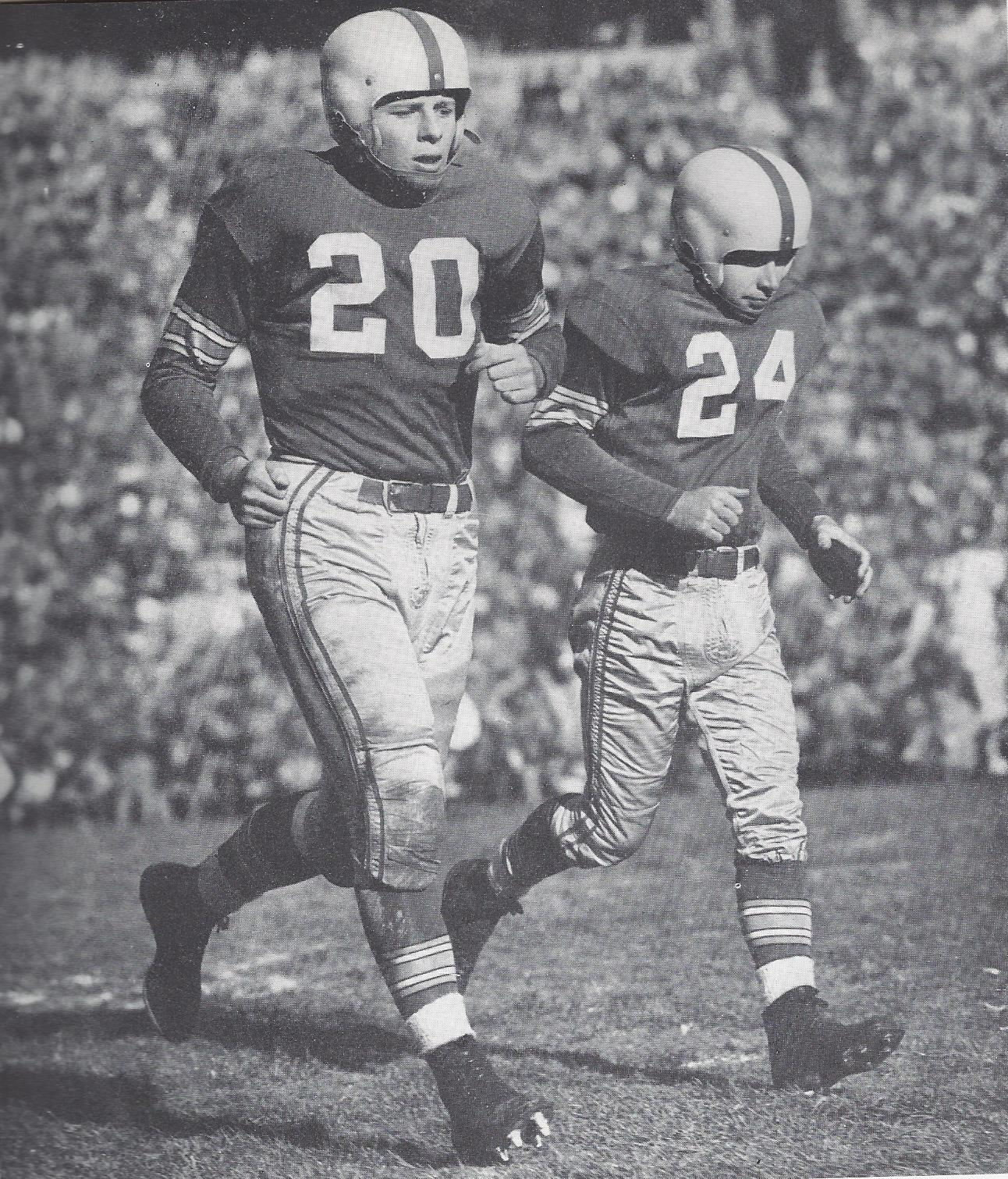
Team co-captain John Borton (20) and Tad Weed in 1952

- Woody Hayes – Head coach – 4th year

== All-Americans ==
- Dean Dugger, E
- Howard Cassady, HB (Team MVP)
- Jim Reichenbach, G

== All-Big Ten ==
- Dean Dugger, E
- Howard Cassady, HB
- Francis Machinsky, T
- Dick Hilinski

== 1955 NFL draftees ==
Player	Round	Pick	Position	NFL club
Bobby Watkins	2	23	Halfback	Chicago Bears
Dean Dugger	4	46	End	Philadelphia Eagles
Dave Leggett	7	74	Quarterback	Chicago Cardinals
Jerry Krisher	13	153	Center	Philadelphia Eagles
John Borton	13	157	Quarterback	Cleveland Browns
Dick Brubaker	15	170	End	Chicago Cardinals
Bob Myers	28	328	Defensive tackle	Baltimore Colts
Dave Williams	28	330	Guard	Pittsburgh Steelers
