= John Borton =

American football player (1932–2002)

No. 10
- Position: Quarterback

Personal information
- Born: December 14, 1932; Alliance, Ohio, U.S.
- Died: April 8, 2002 (aged 69); Massillon, Ohio, U.S.
- Listed height: 6 ft 0 in (1.83 m)
- Listed weight: 208 lb (94 kg)

Career information
- High school: Alliance
- College: Ohio State
- NFL draft: 1955: 13th round, 157th overall pick

Career history
- Cleveland Browns (1957)

Career NFL statistics
- Passing yards: 22
- TD–INT: 0-1
- Passer rating: 19.4
- Stats at Pro Football Reference

John Robert Borton (December 14, 1932 – April 8, 2002) was an American professional football player who was a quarterback in the National Football League (NFL) for the Cleveland Browns. He played college football for the Ohio State Buckeyes.

Borton died in 2002.
