= Art Walker (gridiron football) =

American gridiron football player (1933–1973)

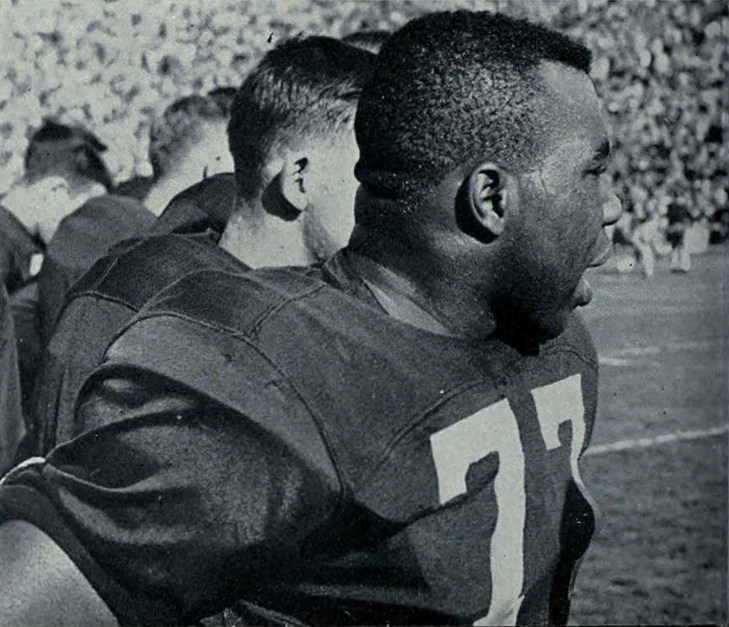
- Walker in 1954

No. 50
- Positions: Offensive tackle, Guard

Personal information
- Born: November 24, 1933; South Haven, Michigan, U.S.
- Died: May 26, 1973 (aged 39); Marquette, Michigan, U.S.
- Listed height: 5 ft 11 in (1.80 m)
- Listed weight: 230 lb (104 kg)

Career information
- High school: South Haven
- College: Michigan
- NFL draft: 1955: 12th round, 137th overall pick

Career history
- 1955–1961: Edmonton Eskimos

Awards and highlights
- 2× Grey Cup champion (1955, 1956); DeMarco–Becket Memorial Trophy (1957, 1959); CFL's Most Outstanding Lineman Award runner up (1957); 4× CFL West All-Star (1955, 1957, 1958, 1959); First-team All-American (1954); 2× First-team All-Big Ten (1952, 1954)

Arthur D. Walker, Jr. (November 24, 1933 – May 26, 1973) was an American football player. He was an All-American at the University of Michigan in 1954 and played seven seasons of professional football with the Edmonton Eskimos of the Canadian Football League (CFL) from 1955 to 1961.

== Early life ==
Walker, an African-American who grew up four miles east of South Haven, Michigan, attended South Haven High School where he was an All-Big Seven Conference tackle and president of the student council. He was also a catcher on a local baseball team.

== College career ==
After graduating from high school in 1951, Walker was awarded an Elmer Gedeon scholarship to the University of Michigan. The Gedeon scholarships, created in memory of a multi-sport student athlete who was killed in World War II, were awarded on the basis of "moral character, good citizenship, scholastic ability, and achievement, promise of leadership and success, and physical ability." Walker played left tackle at Michigan from 1952 to 1954. As a 192-pound sophomore in 1952, Walker started nine games for the Wolverines and was named an All-Big Ten Conference player.

In June 1953, Walker suffered a setback when he pleaded guilty in Ann Arbor Municipal Court to stealing gasoline from a parked car; Walker and another student admitted siphoning gas from a car parked behind a dormitory and paid fines totaling $16.25. As a 200-pound junior in 1953, Walker suffered from injuries. Walker played with a leg injury against Tulane in October 1954, and the Associated Press described Walker as the "sparkplug of the Wolverine line" and reported that, despite the injury, he "made smashing tackles and was a demon getting down under punts." However, his play against Tulane aggravated the injury, resulting in his missing the following game. As a 218-pound senior in 1954, Walker had his best season at Michigan. He played alongside left end Ron Kramer, giving the Wolverines "the strongest defensive left side in the Big Ten." During the 1954 season, Walker played more minutes than any other Michigan player—playing 479 out of 540 minutes in Michigan's nine-game schedule.

He was named to the 1954 All-Big Ten teams selected by the Associated Press and the United Press. He was also selected to play in the annual East-West Shrine Game, and selected by the Football Writers Association of America to the Look magazine All-American team in 1954. Walker was flown to New York to receive the Look magazine award on The Jackie Gleason Show in December 1954. Walker was the first South Haven athlete ever to receive an All-American rating, and local residents honored him at a testimonial banquet in February 1955. Michigan's line coach Jack Blott spoke at the banquet, and Walker was given a set of luggage.

== Professional career ==
Walker was drafted 137th overall by the Green Bay Packers in the 12th round of the 1955 NFL draft, but opted instead to play in Canada. Walker told a reporter that he went to Canada because they offered more money than the NFL, and he had heard tales of salary troubles of Green Bay players. Walker played seven seasons of professional football as an offensive tackle and defensive guard for the Edmonton Eskimos of the Western Interprovincial Football Union from 1955 to 1961. Prior to the fourth season of Walker's tenure with the Eskimos, the WIFU agreed to a merger with the Interprovincial Rugby Football Union which resulted in the formation of the Canadian Football League.

His best season as a professional player was 1957, when he was named Edmonton's Most Valuable Player and was named to the Western Division all-star teams in two polls, one selected by the fans and the other by sportswriters and broadcasters. He also played in the 1957 CFL All-Star Game. After the 1957 season, Walker told a reporter from his home town that he had no regrets about playing in the CFL, despite having to participate in a practice in 17 below zero weather and playing in a game in six below zero weather. In seven seasons with the Eskimos, he became one of the team's most popular players. After a victory over the Winnipeg Blue Bombers in 1959, a Winnipeg columnist credited Walker with the victory:

There are many reasons why the Bombers failed to make it close, but a major one was a gent by the name of Art Walker. Even a delighted Eagle Keys went on record that he had never seen Walker play a better game than he did last night. Art handled Ed Kotowich and Fred Cole as if he owned them.

Another writer described Walker's performance in the same game as follows:

Thursday night Walker, who seemed bent on some personal vendetta, simply refused to let Winnipeg run anything to the left side of the Edmonton line. Mostly it was sheer ability, but to make his performance even more galling to the Winnipeg offensive unit, every time he guessed right.

Walker's football career came to an end after the 1961 season. He missed most of the 1960 season with a damaged Achilles tendon and battled through pain during training camp in 1961. After making it through the first 15 games of the 1961 season without an injury, Walker's Achilles tendon injury returned in the third quarter of the season's final game. Following the game, Walker told a reporter that, as he hobbled to the sidelines, he knew his football career were over. He said:

I'd never go through another training camp like I did this year. Anyway what's the point of kidding anyone. I'd never be able to play as well again, even if I tried.

After retiring from football, Walker stated his intent to remain in Edmonton as his permanent home. He noted that he and his wife had good teaching jobs in Edmonton, and "the people in Edmonton have been wonderful to both my family and myself."

== Death ==
According to the book "The Canadian Pro Football Encyclopedia" by Tod Maher and Bob Gill (Maher Sports Media 2011), Walker died on May 26, 1973, in Marquette, Michigan, at age 39.

== See also ==
- 1954 College Football All-America Team
- Michigan Wolverines Football All-Americans
