= Tom Bettis =

American football player and coach (1933–2015)

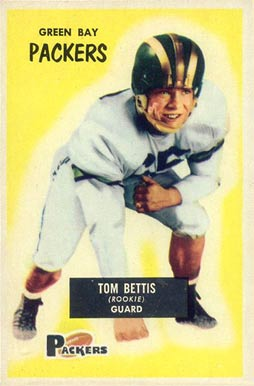
- Bettis on a 1955 Bowman football card

No. 58, 65
- Position: Linebacker

Personal information
- Born: March 17, 1933; Chicago, Illinois, U.S.
- Died: February 28, 2015 (aged 81); Katy, Texas, U.S.
- Listed height: 6 ft 2 in (1.88 m)
- Listed weight: 228 lb (103 kg)

Career information
- High school: St. Mel (Chicago)
- College: Purdue
- NFL draft: 1955: 1st round, 5th overall pick

Career history

Playing
- Green Bay Packers (1955–1961); Pittsburgh Steelers (1962); Chicago Bears (1963)

Coaching
- Kansas City Chiefs (1966-1976) Defensive backs; Kansas City Chiefs (1977) Defensive coordinator/interim head coach; St. Louis Cardinals (1978–1984) Defensive coordinator; Cleveland Browns (1985) Defensive coordinator; Houston Oilers (1986–1987) Defensive backs; Kansas City Chiefs (1988) Defensive backs; Philadelphia Eagles (1989–1990) Defensive backs; Los Angeles Rams (1991) Defensive backs; Houston Oilers (1993–1994) Defensive backs

Awards and highlights
- As coach: Super Bowl champion (IV); As player: 2× NFL champion (1961, 1963); First-team All-American (1954); 2× First-team All-Big Ten (1953, 1954)

Career NFL statistics
- Interceptions: 1
- Fumble recoveries: 6
- Sacks: 4.5
- Stats at Pro Football Reference

Head coaching record
- Regular season: 1–6–0 (.143)
- Coaching profile at Pro Football Reference

Thomas William Bettis (March 17, 1933 – February 28, 2015) was an American professional football player and coach in the National Football League (NFL). He played for nine seasons as a linebacker.

Bettis played college football for the Purdue Boilermakers, earning first-team All-American honors in 1954. He was selected by the Green Bay Packers in the first round of the 1955 NFL draft with the fifth overall pick. He played nine seasons for the Packers, the Pittsburgh Steelers, and the Chicago Bears. After his playing career, Bettis went on to coach in the NFL for 30 years, including for the 1969–70 Super Bowl IV champions and the 1966–67 AFL champions, the Kansas City Chiefs. Bettis served as interim coach of the Chiefs in 1977 after the firing of Paul Wiggin. In seven games as head coach, Bettis compiled a 1–6 record, ending a 12-year stint as a coach of the Chiefs. He returned in 1988 to be the defensive backs coach of the Chiefs. He was inducted into both the Purdue University Athletic Hall of Fame and the Chicagoland Sports Hall of Fame.

Bettis died on February 28, 2015.

== Head coaching record ==
Team	Year	Regular season					Postseason			
Team	Year	Won	Lost	Ties	Win %	Finish	Won	Lost	Win %	Result
KC*	1977	1	6	0	.143	5th in AFC West	—	—	—	—
Total		1	6	0	.143		0	0	.000	

* – Interim head coach

== See also ==
- 1954 College Football All-America Team
- Chicagoland Sports Hall of Fame
