= Johnny Allen (American football) =

American football player (1933–2010)

No. 52
- Positions: Center, linebacker

Personal information
- Born: June 4, 1933; Monmouth, Illinois, U.S.
- Died: March 3, 2010 (aged 76); Bethesda, Maryland, U.S.
- Listed height: 6 ft 2 in (1.88 m)
- Listed weight: 224 lb (102 kg)

Career information
- High school: Fremont (OH) Ross
- College: Purdue
- NFL draft: 1955: 8th round, 87th overall pick

Career history
- Washington Redskins (1955–1958); Detroit Lions (1959)*; Boston Patriots (1961)*
- * Offseason or practice squad member only

Career NFL statistics
- Games played: 48
- Games started: 14
- Fumble recoveries: 1
- Stats at Pro Football Reference

John McKee Allen (June 4, 1933 – March 3, 2010) was an American professional football center in the National Football League (NFL) for the Washington Redskins for four seasons, from 1955 to 1958.

== Early life and education ==
Allen was born in Monmouth, Illinois, and raised in Ohio, the son of John Clayton Allen Jr. and Florence Etta McKee Allen. His grandfather John Clayton Allen was a Congressman from 1925 to 1933. Allen played college football at Purdue University, and played on the East team for the East-West game in January 1955.

== Career ==
Allen was drafted 87th overall in the eighth round of the 1955 NFL draft, but arrived late for Redskins practice in August, because he had to complete military training. He played for the Washington Redskins from 1955 to 1958. His game time was limited, however, because Jim Schrader was the preferred center during his time with the Redskins. In 1959 he was an off-season member of the Detroit Lions; in 1960, he was an off-season member of the Los Angeles Chargers; and in 1961 he was an off-season member of the Boston Patriots.

Allen was active in the Redskins Alumni Association in 1962. In 1965 he was elected vice-president of the Adelphi Boys Club.

== Personal life ==
Allen was married to Pauline M. Lee in 1952 when both were 18 years old. They had a son and a daughter. Allen died on March 3, 2010, in Bethesda, Maryland, at the age of 76.
