= Bob McNamara (Canadian football) =

American gridiron football player (1931–2014)

No. 96, 92, 41
- Positions: Defensive back, Halfback

Personal information
- Born: August 12, 1931; Hastings, Minnesota, U.S.
- Died: July 20, 2014 (aged 82); Minnesota, U.S.
- Listed height: 6 ft 0 in (1.83 m)
- Listed weight: 190 lb (86 kg)

Career information
- High school: Hastings
- College: Minnesota (1951–1954)
- NFL draft: 1953: 9th round, 107th overall pick

Career history
- Winnipeg Blue Bombers (1955–1958); Denver Broncos (1960–1961)

Awards and highlights
- CFL West All-Star (1956); First-team All-American (1954); 2× First-team All-Big Ten (1952, 1954)

Career NFL/AFL statistics
- Rushing yards: 33
- Rushing average: 1.9
- Receptions: 7
- Receiving yards: 143
- Touchdowns: 2
- Interceptions: 7
- Stats at Pro Football Reference

John Robert McNamara (August 12, 1931 – July 20, 2014) was an American football all-star running back in the Canadian Football League (CFL) and the American Football League (AFL).

A star with the collegiate Minnesota Gophers, their team MVP in 1954, McNamara was drafted by the Cleveland Browns. Instead, he turned directly north and signed with the Winnipeg Blue Bombers. However, the promise he showed was unfulfilled, as his career was beset with injury. In 1955, he rushed for only 51 yards. 1956 is when he showed his true form, rushing for 1101 yards, catching 36 passes for another 512 yards, scoring 17 touchdowns, and intercepting two passes. He was chosen as an all-star. Injuries returned and in 1957 he rushed for 90 yards with one touchdown on an interception return. In 1958, he did manage 236 rushing yards and 248 receiving yards, on 18 catches, but he had become a liability to the Bombers with his no cut contract, and he wasn't in the line up for the last half of the season and did not play in their Grey Cup victory. The Bombers then waived him out of the league, but he still holds an amazing CFL record: he scored 6 touchdowns at the BC Lions on October 13, 1956.

McNamara next played with the inaugural Denver Broncos of the new AFL. In two seasons as a receiver and cornerback he caught 7 passes for 143 yards and intercepted 7 passes. He later tried out with the Minnesota Vikings.

In his later years, Bob McNamara was a tireless booster for Minnesota Gophers sports and an instrumental supporter for the school's TCF Bank Stadium, which opened in 2009 and brought outdoor football back to campus. He died while undergoing chemotherapy treatment for cancer, on July 20, 2014.
