= List of Michigan Wolverines football players =

This is a list of Michigan Wolverines football players who have attained notability through their performance in the sport of American football and other endeavors. The list includes over 750 players, including more than 50 All-Americans, three Heisman Trophy winners (Tom Harmon, Desmond Howard and Charles Woodson), six U.S. Congressmen, and a President of the United States (Gerald Ford). The list is presented in alphabetical order but is sortable by the years and positions at which they played.

== Sortable list ==
	Start Year	Last Year	Position(s)	Notes
Howard Abbott	1889	1890	Quarterback	Captain and quarterback of first Minnesota football team in 1886; played quarterback for Michigan as a law student
Bobby Abrams	1986	1989	Linebacker	Played 6 years in the NFL with the Giants, Browns, Cowboys, Vikings and Patriots
Jamar Adams	2004	2007	Safety	Played 3 years in the NFL for the Seahawks
Derrick Alexander	1990	1993	Wide receiver	All-American, 1992; Played 9 years in the NFL with the Browns, Ravens, Chiefs and Vikings
Erick All	2019	2022	Tight end	
Earl Allen	1981	1982	Wide receiver, defensive back	Played 1 year in the NFL with the Oilers
Frank Gates Allen	1879	1880	Forward	Later became president of the Moline Plow Company and president of the Moline State Trust & Savings Bank
William Allen	1898	1898	Guard	Served as head football coach, Washington State, 1900, 1902
Dave Allerdice	1907	1909	Halfback	All-American 1909; Head coach for Texas 1911–1915
Harry Allis	1948	1950	End, placekicker	Big Ten scoring leader, 1948
Ernest Allmendinger	1911	1913	Guard	All-Western 1913; All-Service Team 1917
Erick Anderson	1988	1991	Linebacker	1991 Butkus Award winner; 1991 All-American; Played 5 years in the NFL with the Chiefs and Redskins
John Anderson	1975	1977	Linebacker	Played 12 years in the NFL with the Packers; Became the Packers' all-time leader in tackles (1,020)
Kurt Anderson	1997	2001	Offensive line	
Andrel Anthony	2021	2022	Wide receiver	
Mel Anthony	1962	1964	Fullback	MVP 1965 Rose Bowl; Played 2 years in the CFL with the Tiger-Cats and Alouettes
John Arbeznik	1976	1979	Offensive guard	First-team All-Big Ten, 1978–1978
David Arnold	1985	1988	Cornerback	All-Big Ten 1988; Played 1 year in the NFL with the Steelers
Adrian Arrington	2004	2007	Wide receiver	Played in the NFL for the Saints from 2008 to 2010
Devin Asiasi	2016	2016	Tight end	Ranked by ESPN as the No. 3 tight end in college football's incoming Class of 2016 and the No. 44 overall player in the 2016 ESPN 300
B. J. Askew	1999	2002	Fullback	MVP 2002 Michigan football team; Played 7 years in the NFL with the Jets and Buccaneers
Howie Auer	1929	1931	Tackle	All-Big Ten, 1931; Played 1 year in the NFL for the Eagles
Jason Avant	2002	2005	Wide receiver	MVP 2005 Michigan team; Played in the NFL for the Eagles, 2006 to 2010
David Baas	2004	2004	Center, guard	2004 Rimington Trophy co-recipient; 1994 All-American; Played in the NFL for the 49ers 2005 to 2010
Dick Babcock	1922	1925	Tackle	Later served as head football coach at Akron and Cincinnati
Jeff Backus	1997	2000	Offensive tackle	All-Big Ten, 1999 and 2000; Played in the NFL with the Lions 2001 to present
Fred Baer	1952	1954	Fullback	MVP, 1954 Michigan football team
Ray Baer	1924	1927	Guard, tackle	First-team All-Big Ten and second-team All-American, 1927
Donald A. Bailey	1964	1966	Guard	U.S. Congress, 1979–1983; Auditor General of Pennsylvania, 1985–1989; Awarded Silver Star, 3 Bronze Stars, and Army Air Medal for service in Vietnam War
James Baird	1892	1895	Quarterback	Directed the construction of the Flatiron Building, Lincoln Memorial, Arlington Memorial Amphitheater, and Tomb of the Unknown Soldier
Lou Baldacci	1953	1955	Quarterback, fullback	Set Michigan record for longest field goal, 1953; Played 1 year in the NFL with the Steelers
Daylen Baldwin	2021	2021	Wide receiver	
Ted Bank	1919	1921	Quarterback	Head football coach at Idaho, 1935–1940; chief of U.S. Army athletic operations during World War II; president of the Athletic Institute of American from 1945–1966
Alfred Barlow	1905	1905	Quarterback	
Edmond H. Barmore	1879	1880	Halfback, quarterback	Later became a steamship builder and founder of the Los Angeles Transfer Co.
Terry Barr	1954	1956	Halfback	Played 9 seasons in the NFL with the Lions; Two-time Pro Bowl selection
Antonio Bass	2005	2005	Wide receiver	Top-rated high school player in Michigan, 2003; Suffered career-ending knee injury in 2006
Mike Bass	1964	1966	Defensive back	Played 8 seasons in the NFL with the Lions and Redskins; 30 NFL interceptions; Scored Redskins' only points in Super Bowl VII
Brad Bates	1980	1980	Defensive back	Later athletic director at Miami U. and Boston College
Rick Bay	1961	1965	Quarterback	Later athletic director at Oregon, Ohio St., Minnesota, San Diego St.
Elmer Beach	1882	1883	Quarterback	Founder of the Beach & Beach law firm in Chicago; brother of novelist Rex Beach
Kurt Becker	1978	1981	Guard	1981 All-American; Played 9 years in the NFL for the Bears and Rams
Tom Beckman	1969	1971	Defensive end, linebacker	Played 1 season in the NFL with the Cardinals; 2 seasons in the WFL with Memphis
Roy Beechler	1904	1904	Center, tackle	Coached Mt. Union in 1905; co-founded Vulcan Motor Axle Co. in 1920
Gordon Bell	1973	1975	Tailback	Set Michigan's single-season all-purpose yardage record with 1,714 yards in 1974; Played 3 years in the NFL with the Giants and Cardinals
Ronnie Bell	2018	2022	Wide receiver	
Ronald Bellamy	1999	2002	Wide receiver	Played in the NFL for the Dolphins, Ravens and Lions
Albert Benbrook	1908	1910	Guard	Inducted into the College Football Hall of Fame, 1971; All-American, 1909 and 1910
John W. F. Bennett	1896	1898	Guard, end	Supervised construction of Algonquin Hotel in New York and the Ritz and Waldorf Hotels in London
Bob Bergeron	1980	1984	Kicker	First-team All-Big Ten, 1983
Albert Berkowitz	1929	1930	Halfback	
Chuck Bernard	1931	1933	Center	All-American 1932 and 1933; Played 1 year in the NFL for the Lions; Gerald R. Ford was his back-up
Jim Betts	1968	1970	Quarterback, safety	
Tshimanga Biakabutuka	1993	1995	Tailback	Born in Zaire; Rushed for 313 yards against Ohio State, 1995; Set Michigan single season rushing record in 1995 with 1,818 yards; Played 6 seasons in the NFL with the Panthers
Rolla Bigelow	1902	1903	Halfback, fullback, tackle	Subsequently, founded the Bigelow & Co investment banking firm and Eastern Exchange Bank, both in New York
Tarik Black	2017	2019	Wide receiver	
John A. Bloomingston	1894	1895	Fullback	Leading scorer on the 1895 team that won Michigan's first Western football championship.
Jack Blott	1922	1923	Center	All-American, 1923; Played Major League Baseball for the Reds in 1924; Head football coach at Wesleyan, 1934–1940; Assistant football coach at Michigan for 23 years
Marion Body	1979	1982	Cornerback	Played in the USFL for the Michigan Panthers
Thomas A. Bogle, Jr.	1910	1911	Center, Guard, Tackle	Head coach at DePauw, 1913–1914
Joe Bolden	2012	2015	Linebacker	
Tony Boles	1987	1989	Tailback	MVP, 1989 Michigan football team; All-Big Ten, 1988 and 1989; Played 2 years in the NFL for the Cowboys and Raiders
Justin Boren	2006	2007	Guard, center	Transferred to Ohio State in 2008; All-Big Ten, 2009; Son of Mike Boren
Mike Boren	1980	1983	Linebacker	His 212 career tackles ranks 6th in Michigan history
William F. Borgmann	1932	1934	Tackle, guard	Played on back-to-back undefeated national championship teams
Stanley Borleske	1908	1910	End	Later served as he football, basketball, and baseball coach at North Dakota State and Fresno State
Keith Bostic	1980	1982	Safety	Played 7 years in the NFL with the Oilers and Bears; All-Pro and Pro Bowl, 1987
Alan Bovard	1926	1929	Center	All-Big Ten, 1929; Later served as head football coach and athletic director at Michigan Tech
David Bowens	1995	1996	Linebacker	Later played 12 years in the NFL with 7 teams, including 6 years with the Dolphins
Alan Bowman	2021	2022	Quarterback	
Don Bracken	1980	1983	Punter	Later played 8 seasons in the NFL with the Packers and Rams
Tom Brady	1996	1999	Quarterback	Played in the NFL with the Patriots starting 2000, Moved to the Buccaneers in 2020 and as of 2023 has retired. 7-time Super Bowl champion; 4-time Super Bowl MVP; 2-time NFL MVP; 2-time Sporting New Sportsman of the Year; Most wins (regular season and playoffs) by an NFL starting QB in history
Alan Branch	2004	2006	Defensive tackle	ESPN All-American 2006; Played in the NFL with the Cardinals starting in 2007
Dave Brandon	1971	1973	Defensive end, quarterback	Later became CEO of Domino's Pizza; Former University of Michigan athletic director
Jim Brandstatter	1969	1971	Offensive tackle	All-Big Ten 1970; Later became a sportscaster for Detroit Lions and Michigan Wolverines football
David Brandt	1998	2000	Center	Later played 4 years in the NFL with the Redskins and Chargers
Tony Branoff	1952	1955	Halfback	MVP 1953 Michigan football team; Leading rusher for Michigan, 1953 and 1955
Steve Breaston	2003	2006	Wide receiver, return specialist	Holds Michigan record for punt and kickoff return yards; Played in the NFL with the Cardinals starting 2007
Ben Bredeson	2016	2019	Guard	
John Brennan	1936	1938	Guard	Voted "queen" of UM's 1939 ice festival; Played in the NFL for the Packers
Jim Brieske	1942	1947	Placekicker, center	Set collegiate, Big Ten, Rose Bowl, and Michigan placekicking records
Kevin Brooks	1982	1984	Defensive tackle	First round draft pick by Cowboys; played 6 years in the NFL
Carlos Brown	2006	2009	Tailback	1,091 career rushing yards for Michigan
Corwin Brown	1989	1992	Safety	All-Big Ten 1992; Played 8 years in the NFL for the Patriots, Jets and Lions; Later served as defensive coordinator for Notre Dame and defensive backs coach for Jets and Patriots
Dave Brown	1972	1974	Safety	All-American 1974; Inducted into College Football Hall of Fame in 2007; Played 15 years in NFL for Steelers, Seahawks and Browns; 2-time All-Pro
Demetrius Brown	1985	1989	Quarterback	First Michigan quarterback to lead the Wolverines to bowl victories in consecutive seasons, with victories over Alabama in the 1988 Hall of Fame Bowl and USC in the 1989 Rose Bowl
Dennis Brown	1966	1968	Quarterback	All-Big Ten 1968; Broke Big Ten single game record for total offense in his first start; Broke most Michigan passing records; Later an assistant coach at Michigan, West Virginia, Arizona State
Robert J. Brown	1923	1925	Center	All-American 1925; Part of the only father and son Michigan football captains (925 and 1962)
Stevie Brown	2006	2009	Safety	Co-captain 2009 Michigan team; Meyer Morton Award 2008; Roger Zatkoff Award 2009
Jarrod Bunch	1987	1990	Fullback	Played 4 years in the NFL for the Giants and Raiders
Prescott Burgess	2003	2006	Linebacker	Played in the NFL for the Ravens and Patriots starting in 2007
Jerry Burns	1947	1950	Quarterback	Later became head coach at University of Iowa and in NFL for the Packers and Vikings
Devin Bush Jr.	2016	2018	Linebacker	
Jake Butt	2013	2015	Tight end	
William Caley	1896	1898	Guard, halfback, fullback	Also played at Colorado, 1893–1895
Bob Callahan	1945	1946	Center, Tackle	Played 1 year in the AAFC for the Buffalo Bills
Chris Calloway	1987	1989	Wide receiver	Played 11 years in the NFL for the Steelers, Giants, Falcons and Patriots
Charles H. Campbell	1879	1879	Halfback	Became a prominent Detroit lawyer and president of the Detroit Board of Commerce
Mark Campbell	1995	1998	Fullback, tight end	Played 10 years in the NFL with the Browns, Bills and Saints
Will Campbell	2009	2012	Defensive tackle	
Andy Cannavino	1977	1980	Linebacker	All-Big Ten 1980; Played 2 years in the USFL for the Panthers and Blitz
Franklin Cappon	1920	1922	Fullback, halfback, end, tackle	All-Western, 1921; 2nd-team All-American 1922; Later served as head football coach at Kansas and head basketball coach at Michigan and Princeton (1938–1961); Inducted into the Helms Foundation College Basketball Hall of Fame in 1957
Martin H. Carmody	1899	1899	Guard	Served as the Supreme Knight of the Knights of Columbus from 1927 to 1939.
Otto Carpell	1909	1912	Halfback	One of three Michigan football players killed in World War I
Brian Carpenter	1978	1981	Cornerback	Played 3 years in the NFL with the Giants, Redskins and Bills
Jack Carpenter	1946	1946	Tackle	Played 3 years in the AAFC with the Bills and 49ers and 5 years in the CFL with the Tiger-Cats and Argonauts
Bert Carr	1894	1896	Guard, center	Selected in 1896 by the Chicago Tribune as "the best center in the West"; named the greatest guard in Michigan history in 1902
Anthony Carter	1979	1982	Wide receiver	Big Ten MVP 1982; 3-time All-American 1980–1982; Played 3 years in the USFL with the Panthers and Invaders and 11 years in the NFL with the Vikings and Lions; Inducted into the College Football Hall of Fame in 2001
Charles B. Carter	1902	1904	Guard	Later served in the Maine Senate
Milt Carthens	1980	1983	Tight end	Played 1 year in the NFL with the Colts
Tom Cecchini	1963	1965	Linebacker	Head coach at Xavier, 1972–73; defensive line coach for Minnesota Vikings, 1980–83
George Ceithaml	1940	1942	Quarterback	All-Big Ten 1932; Crisler called him "the smartest player he ever taught"; Later served as an assistant coach at Michigan and USC
Thomas Chadbourne	1890	1890	Center	Founded the New York law firm Chadbourne & Parke
Gil Chapman	1972	1974	Fullback, return specialist, tailback, split end	Set Michigan records for career and single-game kickoff return yards; Played 1 year in the NFL for the Saints; First African-American elected to office in Elizabeth, N.J.
Bob Chappuis	1946	1947	Halfback	All-American 1947; Finished 2nd in 1947 Heisman Trophy voting; Played in the AAFC for the Dodgers and Hornets; Shot down over Italy in World War II
Zach Charbonnet	2019	2020	Running back	
John Chase	1879	1880	Rusher, forward	Commander of the Colorado National Guard in confrontations with organized labor, including the Colorado Labor Wars of 1903–1904 and Ludlow Massacre of 1914
Jehu Chesson	2013	2015	Wide receiver	Tied for Michigan record with four receiving touchdowns in a game; 207 receiving yards against Indiana in 2015, also ranks as 3rd in school history
Larry Cipa	1971	1973	Quarterback	Played 2 years in the NFL for the Saints
Jack Clancy	1963	1966	Wide receiver	All-American 1966; Set Michigan career, season and single-game records for receptions and receiving yards; Still holds record for receiving yards (197) in a game; Played 4 years in the NFL with the Dolphins and Packers
Frank Clark	2011	2014	Defensive end	
William Dennison Clark	1903	1905	Halfback, fullback, end	Tackled for a safety in a 2–0 loss to Chicago in 1905, ending a 56-game unbeaten streak; committed suicide in 1932, reportedly to "atone" for the error
Ralph Clayton	1976	1978	Wing back	Played 1 year in the NFL with the Cardinals
Brad Cochran	1983	1985	Cornerback	All-American, 1985
William D. Cochran	1913	1915	Tackle, guard	Served as director of the Federal Reserve Bank of Minneapolis from 1936 to 1950
Junior Colson	2021	2022	Linebacker	
Joe Cocozzo	1989	1992	Guard	Played 5 years in the NFL with the Chargers
Abe Cohn	1917	1920	Halfback, fullback, end	Later coached football and basketball at Whitworth College and Spokane University
Mason Cole	2014	2017	Offensive tackle	
William C. "King" Cole	1902	1902	Tackle, end	Played for "Point-a-Minute" teams; Later served as head football coach at Virginia and Nebraska
Don Coleman	1971	1973	Defensive end	Became the founder, president and CEO of GlobalHue, the largest advertising agency focused on minority communities
Nico Collins	2017	2019	Wide receiver	
Todd Collins	1991	1994	Quarterback	Best career completion percentage (64.28%) in Michigan history; Played in the NFL starting in 1995 for the Bills, Chiefs, Redskins and Bear
Frederick L. Conklin	1909	1911	End, tackle, guard	All-Western 1911; Served 32 years in U.S. Navy attaining rank of rear Admiral
Jim Coode	1971	1973	Offensive tackle	Played 7 years in the CFL with Ottawa; won the CFL's Most Outstanding Offensive Lineman Award in 1978
Evan Cooper	1981	1983	Safety	Played 6 years in the NFL with the Eagles and Falcons
Blake Corum	2020	2022	Running back	First-team All-American 2022
Blake Countess	2011	2014	Defensive back	Top prospect in Michigan's 2011 recruiting class
Shawn Crable	2004	2007	Linebacker	Played in the NFL starting in 2008 for the Patriots
James B. Craig	1911	1913	Halfback, quarterback	All-American 1913; Later served as head football coach and athletic director at Arkansas
Garvie Craw	1967	1969	Fullback, halfback	Scored 2 of Michigan's 3 touchdowns in the 1969 Ohio State game
Frank Crawford	1891	1901		Crawford was both the unpaid head coach and a substitute player for the 1891 team
Maurice E. Crumpacker	1907	1908	Tackle, guard	Became a U.S. Congressman from Oregon, 1925–1927
Frank Culver	1917	1919	Guard, tackle, center	All-American 1917
William Cunningham	1897	1899	Center	Michigan's first All-American football player
Julius Curry	1999	2002	Safety, return specialist	Played 1 year in the NFL with the Lions; Formed Curry Racing in 2006, the first NASCAR racing team with sole minority ownership
Markus Curry	2002	2004	Cornerback	Played 2 years in the NFL for the Chargers
Joe Curtis	1903	1906	Tackle	All-Western 4 times; Played for "Point-a-Minute" teams; Served as head football coach at Tulane and Colorado School of Mines
Tom Curtis	1967	1969	Safety	All-American 1969; Played 2 years in the NFL for the Colts; Inducted into the College Football Hall of Fame in 2005
Bill Daley	1943	1943	Fullback	All-American 1943; Played 3 years in the AAFC for the Dodgers, Seahawks, Rockets and Yankees
Norm Daniels	1929	1931	End, halfback	Later served as the head football, baseball, basketball, wrestling, and squash coach at Wesleyan University
Mike Danna	2016	2019	Defensive lineman	
Thom Darden	1969	1971	Safety, wolfman	All-American 1971; Played 10 years for the Cleveland Browns; All-Pro three times
Tony Dauksza	1933	1933	Quarterback	Became the first person to traverse the Northwest Passage in anything other than a ship on solo canoe expedition, 1966–1971
Carl Davis	1921	1921		Played for the NFL Frankford Yellow Jackets in 1927
Russell Davis	1975	1978	Fullback	MVP of the 1977 team; All-Big Ten; Played for the Pittsburgh Steelers 1980–1983
Fred Dawley	1939	1941	Fullback	Later played in the NFL for the Detroit Lions and Los Angeles Bulldogs
Kenny Demens	2008	2011	Linebacker	
Edwin Denby	1895	1895	Center	U.S. Congressman from Michigan 1905–1911; Served as Secretary of the Navy 1921–1924; played role in the Teapot Dome scandal
Damon Denson	1993	1996	Guard	Played 3 seasons in the NFL for the New England Patriots
James DePree	1903	1904	Fullback	Became the head football coach at Tennessee, 1905–1906
Robert Derleth	1942	1946	Tackle	Played for the Detroit Lions in 1947
Gene Derricotte	1946	1948	Halfback, quarterback	Holds Michigan's single season record for punt return average
Donald R. Deskins	1958	1959	Tackle	Played in all 14 games for the Oakland Raiders in their first season (1960); later became an author and professor of urban geography and sociology
Jim Detwiler	1964	1966	Halfback	All-Big Ten first-team player, 1964–1966
B. J. Dickey	1977	1981	Guard	Starting quarterback, 1979
Dan Dierdorf	1968	1970	Offensive tackle	Six-time Pro Bowl selection; NFL 1970s All-Decade team; inducted into Pro and College Football Hall of Fame
Dean Dingman	1987	1990	Guard	
Drew Dileo	2010	2013	Wide receiver	
Jerry Diorio	1980	1983	Guard	
Tom Dixon	1980	1983	Center	
Tom Dohring	1987	1990	Offensive tackle	
Mark Donahue	1975	1977	Guard	
Glenn Doughty	1969	1971	Halfback, wingback, fullback	"Shake and Bake" spent 8 seasons in the NFL as a receiver for the Baltimore Colts from 1972-79
Prentiss Douglass	1907	1908	Halfback	
Walt Downing	1975	1977	Center	
Charles Drake	1999	2002	Cornerback, safety	
Leo Draveling	1928	1930	End, tackle	
Scott Dreisbach	1995	1998	Quarterback	
Wally Dreyer	1943	1943	Halfback	
Thomas Jesse Drumheller	1896	1896	Quarterback	Later became a leading sheep rancher in Walla Walla, Washington
Kevin Dudley	2002	2004	Fullback	
Don Dufek	1973	1975	Offensive tackle, wolfman	
Don Dufek, Sr.	1948	1950	Fullback	
William J. Duff	1882	1884	Halfback	Later a leading medical doctor in Port Huron, Michigan; served in the Spanish–American War
Ignatius M. Duffy	1896	1896	Fullback	
James E. Duffy	1885	1891	Halfback	Captain of the 1888 team; Set world record in 1886 by drop kicking a football 168 feet, 7-1/2 inches; later became an attorney and member of the UM Board in Control of Athletics
Craig Dunaway	1980	1982	Tight end	
David L. Dunlap	1901	1905	End, halfback	Head football coach at Kenyon (1906), North Dakota (1908–1911), Allegheny (1912)
Robert J. Dunne	1918	1921	End, guard	
Dan Dworsky	1945	1948	Fullback, center, quarterback	
George Dygert	1890	1894	Fullback, halfback	
Matt Dyson	1991	1994	Linebacker	
Don Eaddy	1951	1951	Halfback	First African-American basketball player at Michigan; All-American in baseball; played for Chicago Cubs
William P. Edmunds	1908	1910	Tackle, guard, fullback	Head football coach at West Virginia (1912), Washington University (1913–1916), Vermont (1919)
Braylon Edwards	2002	2004	Wide receiver	Biletnikoff Award winner (2004), Unanimous First Team All-American (2004), Big Ten MVP (2004), 2x First Team Big Ten (2003, 2004), 1x Second Team Big Ten (2002). Holds the Michigan career receiving records in receptions (252), receiving yards (3541), and receiving touchdowns (39). His 39 career touchdown receptions is the Big Ten all-time record. Third place all-time in Big Ten career receptions and receiving yards. Set the Michigan single season receptions record (97) in 2004. Drafted 3rd overall by the Cleveland Browns in the 2005 NFL draft. He also spent time in the NFL with the New York Jets, San Francisco 49ers, and the Seattle Seahawks. Was selected to the Pro Bowl and was a Second Team All-Pro in 2007 as a member of the Browns. Finished his NFL career with 359 receptions, 5,522 receiving yards, and 40 touchdowns.
Donovan Edwards	2021	2022	Running back	Mr. Football Michigan 2020
Stan Edwards	1977	1981	Fullback, tailback	
Tom Edwards	1924	1925	Tackle, guard	
Edgar N. Eisenhower	1912	1912	Reserve	Older brother of U.S. President Dwight Eisenhower
Bump Elliott	1946	1947	Halfback	
Jumbo Elliott	1984	1987	Offensive tackle	
Matt Elliott	1988	1991	Guard, center	
Pete Elliott	1945	1948	Quarterback, halfback	
Hayden Epstein	1998	2001	Placekicker	
Nick Eubanks	2016	2020	Tight end	
Chris Evans	2016	2020	Running back	
Mike Evans	1988	1991		
Forest Evashevski	1938	1940	Quarterback	All-Big Ten quarterback three straight years; head football coach at Iowa 1952–1960; inducted into College Football Hall of Fame in 2000
Herman Everhardus	1931	1933	Halfback	First-team All-Big Ten, 1933; Second-team All-American, 1933
Steve Everitt	1989	1992	Center	All-Big Ten, 1992; Played 7 years in NFL with the Browns, Ravens and Eagles
Obi Ezeh	2007	2010	Linebacker	Roger Zatkoff Award 2008
Justin Fargas	1998	2000	Tailback	Played 7 years in the NFL with the Raiders
Douglas Farmer	1935	1937	Quarterback	Later attended Harvard Medical School and became a professor of medicine at Yale School of Medicine
Royal T. Farrand	1887	1887	Quarterback	Quarterback in 1887 and manager in 1891; hired Michigan's football coach in 1891
Stanley Fay	1931	1933	Halfback, quarterback	Backfield starter for consecutive undefeated national championship teams
Jay Feely	1995	1998	Placekicker	Played 10 years in the NFL 6 teams
Gustave Ferbert	1893	1896	Halfback, end	Michigan's head football coach 1897–1899; became rich in the Yukon Gold Rush
Forest Firestone	1896	1897	Reserve	Head football coach at Buchtel College, now the University of Akron, for one season in 1902
Dave Fisher	1964	1966	Fullback	All-Big Ten 1966
Dennis Fitzgerald	1959	1960	Halfback	Holds Michigan record with 99-yard kickoff return; MVP 1960 Michigan football team; also a championship wrestler; later coached at Kent State and Pittsburgh Steelers
Chris Floyd	1994	1997	Fullback	Played 3 years in the NFL with the Patriots and Browns
J. T. Floyd	2009	2012	Cornerback	
Henry Fonde	1945	1947	Halfback	Threw a 47-yard touchdown pass in 1948 Rose Bowl; Head coach at Ann Arbor Pioneer HS for 10 years; Asst. coach at Michigan for 10 years
Larry Foote	1998	2001	Linebacker	First-team All-American 2001; Played 9 years in the NFL with the Steelers and Lions, including 2 Super Bowl championship teams
Tate Forcier	2009	2010	Quarterback	Starting quarterback in all 12 games as a true freshman
Gerald Ford	1932	1934	Center	MVP 1934 Michigan football team; 38th President of the United States
Len Ford	1945	1947	End	Played 11 years in the AAFC and NFL with the Dons, Browns and Packers; inducted into the Pro Football Hall of Fame in 1976
William Fortune	1917	1919	Guard, tackle	Played 3 years of pro football with the Cardinals and Hammond Pros
Richard France	1898	1899	Guard	First-team All-American 1899
Dennis Franklin	1972	1974	Quarterback	Starting quarterback for Michigan teams with 30-2-1 record; Played 2 seasons in the NFL with the Lions
Dennis Franks	1972	1974	Center	Played 3 season in the NFL with the Philadelphia Eagles and Detroit Lions
Julius Franks	1941	1942	Guard	First-team All-American 1942; Michigan's first African-American All-American
Benny Friedman	1924	1926	Quarterback, halfback	First-team All-American and Big Ten MVP 1926; Inducted into the College Football Hall of Fame (1951) and Pro Football Hall of Fame (2005);
Ralph Fritz	1939	1940	Guard	Played 1 year in the NFL for the Eagles
Ed Frutig	1938	1940	End	First-team All-American 1940; Played 3 years in the NFL with the Packers and Lions
Devin Funchess	2012	2014	Tight end, wide receiver	
Wally Gabler	1964	1965	Quarterback	Played 7 years in the CFL for the Argonauts, Blue Bombers and Tiger-Cats; 13,080 passing yards in the CFL
Dave Gallagher	1971	1973	Defensive tackle, defensive guard	All-Big Ten 1973; Played 6 years in the NFL with the Bears, Giants and Lions
Jeremy Gallon	2010	2013	Wide receiver, return specialist	
Devin Gardner	2010	2014	Quarterback	Rated as the No. 1 high school quarterback in the United States by Rivals.com in 2009
John Garrels	1904	1906	End, fullback	Silver medalist in 110 meter hurdles at 1908 Summer Olympics; Bronze medalist in shot put
Rashan Gary	2016	2018	Defensive tackle	Ranked as the No. 1 recruit in college football's incoming Class of 2016
Elmer Gedeon	1936	1938	End	Played baseball for the Washington Senators; one of two MLB players killed in action during World War II after being shot down while piloting a B-26 bomber in 1944
Zach Gentry	2015	2018	Tight end	
George Genyk	1957	1959	Guard, tackle	1959 team captain; drafted by New York Titans in the first AFL draft
John Ghindia	1947	1949	Quarterback, fullback, halfback	
Brendan Gibbons	2010	2013	Kicker	
Jon William Giesler	1976	1978	Offensive tackle	All-Big Ten 1978; Played 10 years in the NFL for the Dolphins
Louis Gilbert	1925	1927	Halfback	1927 All-Big Ten 1st team
Mike Gillette	1985	1988	Kicker, punter	Set Michigan records for career scoring and longest field goal
Paul Girgash	1979	1982	Linebacker	All-Big Ten 1982; Played 1 year in the USFL for the Panthers
Jordan Glasgow	2016	2019	Linebacker	
Dave Glinka	1960	1962	Quarterback	
Chris Godfrey	1977	1979	Defensive tackle	Played 6 years in the NFL with the Jets, Giants and Seahawks
Paul G. Goebel	1920	1922	End	All-American 1921; Played 4 years in the NFL with the Tigers and Yankees; Later served as mayor of Grand Rapids and University of Michigan Regent
Angus Goetz	1917	1920	Tackle	Second-team All-American 1920; Played professional football with the Buffalo All-Americans and Columbus Tigers
Ian Gold	1996	1999	Linebacker	All-Big Ten 1998 and 1999; Played 8 years in the NFL with the Broncos and Buccaneers; Pro Bowl selection 2001
Cecil Gooding	1902	1903	Guard	Died of typhoid fever contracted during a Thanksgiving football game in 1903; first Michigan football player to die while a student
Jonathan Goodwin	1999	2001	Offensive lineman	
Tom Goss	1964	1968	Defensive end	Served as Michigan's athletic director 1997–2000
Kevin Grady	2005	2009	Running back	
Brandon Graham	2006	2009		
Chris Graham	2004	2007	Linebacker	Roger Zatkoff Award 2007
Mason Graham	2022	2022	Defensive tackle	
Walter "Octy" Graham	1904	1907	Guard, tackle	One of the stars of the "Point-a-Minute" teams of 1904 and 1905
Fred Grambau	1969	1972	Defensive tackle	Later played for the Hamilton Tiger-Cats
Herb Graver	1901	1903	End, halfback, fullback, quarterback	Played for Yost's "Point-a-Minute" teams; Scored 5 touchdowns against Ohio State in 1903; Later served as head football coach at Marietta
Elvis Grbac	1989	1992	Quarterback	Set Michigan records in passing yards (6,460) and passing touchdowns (71); Set Big Ten career passing efficiency record; Played 9 years in the NFL with the 49ers, Chiefs and Ravens
Derrick Green	2013	2015	Running back	
John Greene	1940	1943	Tackle, Quarterback	Later played 7 years in the NFL with the Lions
George Greenleaf	1893	1896	Quarterback, end	Later coached the 1899 Miami football team and became a medical doctor
Curtis Greer	1976	1979	Defensive end	All-American 1979; Played 8 seasons in the NFL with the Cardinals
Bruce Gregory	1924	1925	Halfback	Played 1 season in the NFL with the Detroit Panthers
George W. Gregory	1901	1903	Center	Starting center for "Point-a-Minute" teams; head coach at Kenyon (1905)
Brian Griese	1995	1997	Quarterback	Led Michigan to an undefeated season and national championship in 1997
Charles Grube	1923	1925	End	Played 1 season in the NFL with the Detroit Panthers
Matt Gutierrez	2003	2005	Quarterback	Played 3 years in the NFL with the Patriots and Chiefs
Thomas Guynes	1994	1996	Offensive guard	Played 1 year in the NFL with the Cardinals
H. G. Hadden	1894	1894	Tackle	Transferred and served as player and coach of the 1895 Notre Dame team
Ali Haji-Sheikh	1979	1981	Placekicker	
Will Hagerup	2010	2015	Placekicker, punter	
Forrest M. Hall	1895	1895	Guard	Played for Princeton's 1893 national championship team; coached Auburn in 1894; set shot put record in 1895; asst. coach at Michigan, 1898 and 1909
James Hall	1996	1999		
Leon Hall	2003	2006	Cornerback	
Remy Hamilton	1992	1996	Placekicker	
Mike Hammerstein	1981	1985	Defensive tackle	
Thomas S. Hammond	1903	1905	End, halfback, fullback, tackle	Played for the "Point-a-Minute" teams; later served as head coach at Ole Miss; became President of Whiting Corporation
Mike Hankwitz	1966	1969		
William W. Hannan	1879	1879	Rusher	Played for the first Michigan football team; became the leading real estate developer in Detroit in the late 19th century
Jim Harbaugh	1983	1986	Quarterback	
Mike Harden	1976	1979	Defensive back	
Tom Harmon	1938	1940	Halfback	1940 Heisman Trophy winner
Darrell Harper	1957	1959	Halfback	
David Harris	2003	2006	Linebacker	
Mike Hart	2004	2007	Running back	
Hassan Haskins	2018	2021	Running back	
Clint Haslerig	1971	1973	Wingback, flanker	Later played three years in the NFL with the Bears, Bills, Vikings and Jets
Brad Hawkinns	2017	2021	Safety	
Harry Hawkins	1923	1925	Tackle, Guard	Won the NCAA championship in the hammer throw in 1926; First-team All-Western football player 1925
Mercury Hayes	1992	1995	Wide receiver	
Ryan Hayes	2018	2022	Second-team All-Big Ten 2022	
Ralph Heikkinen	1936	1938	Guard	All-American 1939; MVP of the 1937 and 1938 Michigan football teams; Played 1 year in the NFL for the Brooklyn Dodgers
Chuck Heater	1972	1974	Running back	
Guy T. Helvering	1905	1905		Later served in U.S. Congress and as a U.S. District Court Judge
Junior Hemingway	2008	2011	Wide receiver	Had 3 receptions for 165 yards against Notre Dame in 2011
John Henderson	1962	1964	End	Played 8 years in the NFL with the Lions and Vikings
Tommy Hendricks	1996	1999	Defensive back	
Chad Henne	2004	2007	Quarterback	
John Hennessy	1974	1976	Defensive tackle	Played 3 years in the NFL with the Jets
A. J. Henning	2020	2022	Wide receiver	Second-team All-Big Ten 2022
Frederick W. Henninger	1893	1896	Tackle, guard	Later served as an assistant football coach at Michigan before successful career in manufacturing
Drew Henson	1998	2000	Quarterback	
Jim Herrmann	1980	1982	Linebacker	
Albert E. Herrnstein	1899	1902	Halfback, end	Scored 6 touchdowns against Ohio State in 1902; Played on "Point-a-Minute" teams; Later served as head football coach at Haskell, Purdue and Ohio State
John Herrnstein	1956	1958	Fullback	Later played Major League Baseball from 1962–1966 with the Phillies, Cubs and Braves
Willie Heston	1901	1904	Halfback	Often selected as the greatest halfback of all-time; Picked by Fielding Yost as the greatest player of all-time; Inducted into College Football Hall of Fame in 1954; Served as head football coach at Drake and N.C. State; Became a judge in Detroit
Bill Hewitt	1929	1931	End, fullback	MVP 1931 Michigan team; Played 9 years in the NFL for the Bears, Eagles and Steagles; Inducted into the Pro Football Hall of Fame in 1971
Dwight Hicks	1975	1977	Safety	
Karan Higdon	2015	2018	Running back	
Frank G. Higgins	1885	1885	Forward	First native-born person from Montana admitted to the state's bar and to serve in its legislature; Lieutenant Governor of Montana, 1901–05
Bruce Hilkene	1943	1947	Tackle	Captain of the undefeated 1947 Michigan team known as the "Mad Magicians"
Daxton Hill	2019	2021	Safety	First-team All-Big Ten 2021
Dick Hill	1954	1956	Guard	MVP of the 1956 team; played one season with the Montreal Alouettes
Henry Hill	1968	1970	Defensive guard, offensive guard	All-American 1970; MVP 1970 Michigan football team; Came to Michigan as a walk-on
Lavert Hill	2016	2019	Defensive back	
Elroy "Crazy Legs" Hirsch	1943	1943	Halfback	Only Michigan athlete to letter in football, baseball, basketball and track in the same year; Played 12 years in AAFC and NFL for Rockets and Rams; Inducted into College (1974) and Pro Football Hall of Fame (1968).
Leroy Hoard	1987	1989	Running back	
Mike Hoban	1971	1973	Guard	Played for the Chicago Bears in 1974
Victor Hobson	1999	2002	Linebacker	
George Hoey	1967	1968	Halfback	
George S. Holden	1890	1890	Quarterback	
Gib Holgate	1943	1943	Halfback	Asst. football coach and assoc. athletic director at Yale
John W. Hollister	1893	1895	Halfback	Later served as head football coach at Mississippi, Beloit College and Morningside College
Bob Hollway	1947	1949	End	Later served as head coach of the St. Louis Cardinals, 1971–1972
Jason Horn	1992	1995	Defensive lineman	
Walter S. Horton	1881	1881	Quarterback	The second Michigan player at the quarterback position; practiced law in Illinois for 50 years
Chris Howard	1994	1997	Running back	
Desmond Howard	1989	1991	Wide receiver, return specialist	1991 Heisman Trophy winner
Harlan Huckleby	1975	1978	Tailback	
Khaleke Hudson	2016	2019	Linebacker	
Marty Huff	1968	1970	Linebacker	
Tommy Hughitt	1912	1913	Quarterback, halfback	Played professional football from 1917–1924 for Buffalo and Youngstown
Tom Huiskens	1969	1970	Tight end	
Stefan Humphries	1980	1983	Guard	
Maurice Hurst Jr.	2014	2017	Defensive tackle	
Aidan Hutchinson	2018	2021	Defensive end	Hendricks, Lombardi, and Lott Trophies 2021
Chris Hutchinson	1989	1992	Defensive tackle	
Steve Hutchinson	1997	2000	Offensive lineman	Unanimous All American in 2000
Emory J. Hyde	1901	1901	Reserve	Later served as head football coach at TCU, 1905–1907
Robert Ingalls	1939	1941	Center	
Jarrett Irons	1993	1996	Linebacker	
Ty Isaac	2015	2017	Running back	
Marlin Jackson	2001	2004	Cornerback	
Donovan Jeter	2017	2021	Defensive tackle	
Giles Jackson	2019	2020	Wide receiver	
Ray Jackson	1997	1998	Running back	
Efton James	1912	1914	End	One of three Michigan football players killed in World War I
Harry James	1903	1903	Quarterback	Starting quarterback on the 1903 "Point-a-Minute" team
William James	1981	1983		
Tim Jamison	2005	2008	Defensive end	
Fred Janke	1936	1938	Tackle, fullback	
Jon Jansen	1995	1998	Tackle	
Albert W. Jefferis	1891	1891	Center	Later served in the U.S. Congress from Nebraska
Trezelle Jenkins	1991	1994	Tackle	
Ferris Jennings	1934	1936	Quarterback, safety	Starting quarterback for the 1934 team
George Jewett	1890	1892	Fullback, halfback, placekicker	First African-American football player at both Michigan and Northwestern; one of the greatest players in the pre-Yost era
Dan Jilek	1973	1975	Defensive end	
James Edward Johns	1920	1922	Guard, tackle	
Cornelius Johnson	2019	2022	Wide receiver	
Farnham Johnson	1943	1943	End	
Ron Johnson	1966	1968	Halfback	First-team All-American, 1968; Set NCAA single-game rushing record (347 yards); Inducted into the College Football Hall of Fame, 1992; Played 8 seasons in the NFL for the Browns, Giants and Cowboys
Roy W. Johnson	1919	1919	Center, guard	Later served as head football coach at New Mexico
Tom Johnson	1948	1951	Tackle	Most valuable defensive tackle in the Big Ten, 1950; First-team All-American, 1951; Second African-American to play for the Green Bay Packers
Will Johnson	2022		Cornerback	
Collins H. Johnston	1879	1880	Halfback	Became a medical doctor, surgeon, and civic leader in Grand Rapids, Michigan
Mike Jolly	1976	1979	Defensive back	
Damon Jones	1992	1993	Tight end	
Dhani Jones	1996	1999	Linebacker	
Mike L. Jones	1985	1985	Quarterback	
Paul J. Jones	1902	1902	Fullback	Starter for the 1902 "Point-a-Minute" team; head football coach at Western Reserve; U.S. District Court Judge in Ohio from 1923–1965
Bennie Joppru	1999	2002	Tight end	
Fred Julian	1957	1959	Defensive back	Leading rusher for UM 1959; led New York Titans in interceptions 1960
Cato June	1999	2002	Defensive back	
Kyle Kalis	2012	2015	Offensive lineman	
Zeno Karcz	1954	1954	Linebacker, running back	Later played for the Hamilton Tiger-Cats for 9 years; Won the 1965 Most Outstanding Canadian award
Jack Karwales	1941	1942	End, tackle	
Alain Kashama	2000	2003	Defensive lineman	
Eric Kattus	1982	1985	Tight end	
Bill Keating	1964	1965	Guard	
Tom Keating	1961	1963	Tackle	
Jackson Keefer	1922	1922	Halfback	
Trevor Keegan	2020	2022	Offensive guard	First-team All-Big Ten
Leo J. Keena	1897	1899	Fullback	Later served as U.S. General Consul in Paris and Warsaw and as U.S. Ambassador to Honduras and South Africa
Mike Keller	1969	1971	Defensive end	
Reuben Kelto	1939	1941	Tackle	MVP 1941 Michigan team; Upper Peninsula Hall of Fame
Carlo Kemp	2016	2020	Defensive end	
Dick Kempthorn	1947	1949	Fullback	MVP 1949 Michigan team; Won Distinguished Flying Cross as a jet fighter pilot in the Korean War
Mike Kenn	1975	1977	Tackle	Played 16 years in the NFL for the Falcons; 5-time Pro Bowl selection; 3-time first-team All-Pro; NFL Players Association President, 1989–1996
Wilford Ketz	1927	1927	Tackle	NCAA champion in the hammer throw (1928), NACDA Hall of Fame (1978)
David Key	1987	1990	Defensive back	Played for the Patriots in 1991
Henry Killilea	1883	1884	Center, forward	One of the five men, along with Connie Mack, Charles Comiskey and Ban Johnson, who founded baseball's American League in 1899; owner of the Milwaukee Brewers (which became the Baltimore Orioles) and Boston Red Sox
Harry Kipke	1920	1923	Halfback	All-American, 1922–1923; Played football, basketball and baseball at Michigan; Served as Michigan's head coach, 1929–1937; Coached national championship teams, 1932–1933; Inducted into College Football Hall of Fame, 1958; Walter Camp Man of the Year, 1970
Bernard Kirk	1921	1922	End	All-American, 1921–1922; Died in December 1922 as a result of injuries sustained in automobile accident
James Knight	1901	1901	End	Later served as head coach at Washington, 1902–1905
Marcus Knight	1996	1999	Wide receiver	
Kenneth Knode	1918	1918	Quarterback	Starting quarterback for Michigan's 1918 national championship team; later played Major League Baseball for the St. Louis Cardinals as "Mike" Knode
Robert Knode	1921	1922	Quarterback	Later played Major League Baseball for the Cleveland Indians as "Ray" Knode
Gene Knutson	1951	1953	End	
Leo Koceski	1948	1950	Halfback	Known as the "Canonsburg Comet"; Played for undefeated 1948 national championship team
Archie Kodros	1937	1939	Center	Later served as head football coach at Whitman and Hawaii; assistant coach at Iowa for 14 years
Kevin Koger	2008	2011	Tight end	
Ralph Kohl	1947	1948	Tackle	Later coached at Eastern Illinois and was head scout for the Minnesota Vikings
Robert Kolesar	1940	1942	Guard	Played for Cleveland Browns, 1946
Jordan Kovacs	2009	2012	Safety	
John Kowalik	1931	1933	Guard	Played for the Ottawa Rough Riders in 1934
Ron Kramer	1955	1956	End	All-American, 1955–1956; Played 10 years in NFL for Packers and Lions; First-team All Pro, 1962; Inducted into College Football Hall of Fame, 1978
Adam Kraus	2005	2007	Offensive guard	First-team All-Big Ten 2006, 2007
Walt Kreinheder	1920	1921	Center, Guard	
Ted Kress	1951	1953	Halfback	
Paul Kromer	1938	1940	Halfback	Formed the "Touchdown Twins" combination with Tom Harmon in 1938
Tom Kuzma	1941	1942	Halfback	Followed Tom Harmon as Michigan's main running back; Finished 2nd in the Big Ten in total offense, 1941
Horace LaBissoniere			Center, guard	Played for the Hammond Pros in 1922
Omer LaJeunesse	1929	1931	Guard, fullback	Head coach at Michigan Tech, 1957–1962
John Landowski	1921	1921	Halfback	Won the 1922 NCAA Championship in the pole vault
Jesse R. Langley	1904	1907		Head football coach at TCU, 1908–1909
Mike Lantry	1972	1974	Placekicker	First-team All-American, 1973; Set Michigan records for longest field goal, most field goals, and most extra points; Missed key field goals in last minutes of 1973 and 1974 Ohio State games.
Bill Laskey	1962	1964	End	
Ty Law	1992	1994	Cornerback	
James E. Lawrence	1902	1902	Placekicker, fullback, tackle	Scored 113 points for the 1902 "Point-a-Minute" team
Belford Lawson, Jr.	1921	1923		Second African-American to play football at Michigan; became a leading attorney in the Civil Rights Movement from the 1930s to the 1960s
George M. Lawton	1908	1910	Fullback, punter	Head football coach, University of Detroit, 1913–1914
Milan Lazetich	1944	1944	Tackle, guard, linebacker	First-team All-Big Ten and second-team All-American, 1944; Played 6 years in the NFL for the Rams; First-team All-NFL, 1948–1949
Rick Leach	1975	1978	Quarterback	Three-time All-Big Ten; All-American in baseball and football; Co-MVP 1979 Rose Bowl; Finished 3rd in Heisman Trophy voting, 1978; Won Big Ten batting championship; Played 10 years in Major League Baseball for the Tigers, Blue Jays, Rangers and Giants
Burnie Legette	1989	1992	Fullback	
Matt Lentz	2001	2005	Offensive lineman	
Jeremy LeSueur	2000	2003	Cornerback	
Taylor Lewan	2009	2013	Tackle	
Jourdan Lewis	2013	2015	Cornerback	Set Michigan record with 20 pass breakups in 2015
George Lilja	1977	1980	Center	
Earl Little	1992	1992	Defensive back	
Randy Logan	1970	1972	Wolfback, defensive back	
David Long	2016	2018	Defensive back	
Jake Long	2004	2007	Offensive guard	All-American, 2006–2007; Played in the NFL with Dolphins starting in 2008; 2-time Pro Bowl selection
Frank Longman	1903	1905	Fullback	Later head football coach at Arkansas and Notre Dame
Alvin Loucks	1916	1919	Guard	
Jay Mack Love	1904	1905	Guard	Later head coach at Southwestern (Kansas)
Colston Loveland	2022		Tight end	
Don Lund	1942	1944	Fullback	Played 10 years in Major League Baseball
Jim Lyall	1970	1973	Defensive tackle	Later coached football at Adrian College
Rob Lytle	1973	1976	Fullback	Finished 3rd in 1976 Heisman Trophy voting; Played 7 years in the NFL for the Broncos
William Harrison Mace	1882	1882	Rusher	Later became renowned professor of American history and biographer of Abraham Lincoln
Tom Mack	1963	1965	Offensive tackle	
Elmer Madar	1941	1946	End, quarterback	
Jim Maddock	1954	1956	Quarterback	
Joe Maddock	1902	1903	Tackle	
Tom Maentz	1954	1956	End	
Joe Magidsohn	1909	1910	Halfback	
Paul Magoffin	1904	1907	Halfback	
Ryan Mallett	2007	2007	Quarterback	
William C. Malley	1888	1890	Tackle, guard	
Mike Mallory	1982	1985	Linebacker	
Frank Maloney	1959	1961	Center, guard	Later served as the head football coach at Syracuse University
Jim Mandich	1967	1969	End	
Bob Mann	1944	1947	End	All-Big Ten, 1947; Broke the Big Ten record for receiving yards in 1946 and again in 1947; Played 7 years in the NFL with the Lions and Packers; First African-American for both NFL teams; Led the NFL in receiving yards and yards per catch in 1949
Roy Manning	2001	2004	Linebacker	
Mario Manningham	2005	2007	Wide receiver	
George Mans	1959	1961	End	
Warde Manuel	1986	1989	Defensive lineman	Athletic director at the University at Buffalo (2005–2012), at the University of Connecticut (2012–present)
Jerry Marciniak	1956	1958	Tackle	Played in the CFL for the Saskatchewan Roughriders
Dutch Marion	1923	1924	End	
Doug Marsh	1977	1979	Tight end	Played 7 seasons in the NFL with the St. Louis Cardinals
Mike Martin	2008	2011	Defensive tackle	
Ben Mason	2017	2020	Tight end	
Grant Mason	2004	2005	Cornerback	
Tim Massaquoi	2002	2005	Tight end	
John Maulbetsch	1914	1916	Halfback, Fullback	All-American 1914; Known as the "Human Bullet" and "Featherweight Fullback"; served as head football coach at Phillips, Oklahoma St. and Marshall
Earl Maves	1943	1943	Fullback	
Jalen Mayfield	2018	2020	Offensive lineman	
J. J. McCarthy	2021	2022	Quarterback	
Mike McCray	2014	2017	Linebacker	
Tony McGee	1989	1992	Tight end	
Cameron McGrone	2018	2020	Linebacker	
Sam McGuffie	2008	2008	Running back	Transferred to Houston after 2008 season
Dan McGugin	1901	1902	Guard	Played on "Point-a-Minute" teams; brother-in-law of Fielding H. Yost; Head football coach at Vanderbilt 1904–1934; inducted into the College Football Hall of Fame in 1951
Reggie McKenzie	1969	1971	Offensive guard	
John McLean	1897	1899	Halfback	All-American 1899; Won the silver medal in the 110 metre hurdles at the 1900 Summer Olympics in Paris; Head football coach at Knox and Missouri
Bruce McLenna	1961	1962	Halfback, fullback, end	
Shorty McMillan	1910	1911	Quarterback	
Greg McMurtry	1986	1989	SE	
Cade McNamara	2019	2022	Quarterback	
Thomas H. McNeil	1884	1885	Quarterback	Later became a lawyer in Missouri
Bennie McRae	1959	1961	Halfback	
Ed Meads	1953	1955	Guard	Captain of the 1955 team; awarded Bronze Star for work as combat surgeon in Vietnam War
Zoltan Mesko	2006	2009	Punter	
Mark Messner	1985	1988	Defensive tackle	
Josh Metellus	2016	2019	Safety	
Jerry Meter	1976	1978	Linebacker	Asst. coach at Michigan, 1980–1987
Les Miles	1974	1975	Offensive lineman	Head coach at Oklahoma St. (2001–2004) and LSU (2005–2010)
Frank Millard	1912	1915	Guard	Later served as Michigan Attorney General and General Counsel of the U.S. Army
James Joy Miller	1907	1909	End, halfback, quarterback	
Joe Milton	2018	2020	Quarterback	
Brandon Minor	2006	2009	Running back	
Charles S. Mitchell	1879	1879	Goalkeeper	He was the founder of the Athletic Association; later served as editor of several newspapers in Minnesota and of the Washington Herald
Bo Molenda	1925	1926	Fullback	Played 9 seasons in the NFL
David Molk	2008	2011	Center	Played for the San Diego Chargers in 2012; winner of 2011 Rimington Trophy
Tony Momsen	1945	1950	Center	Played for the Pittsburgh Steelers and washington Redskins
Bryan Mone	2014	2018	Defensive lineman	
Jake Moody	2018	2022	Placekicker	Lou Groza Award 2021
Derrick Moore	2022		Defensive end	
Don Moorhead	1968	1970	Quarterback	Played 5 years in CFL for BC Lions; All-Big Ten quarterback 1970
David Moosman	2006	2009	Linebacker	
Desmond Morgan	2011	2015	Linebacker	
Bill Morley	1895	1895	Quarterback	Went on to receive All-America honors in 1900 and 1901 as a player for Columbia; later inducted into College Football Hall of Fame
Jamie Morris	1984	1987		
Mike Morris	2019	2022	Defensive end	
Shane Morris	2013	2015	Quarterback	
Maynard Morrison	1929	1931	Fullback, center	
Steve Morrison	1990	1994	Linebacker	
John Morrow	1953	1955	Center, tackle	
William M. Morrow	1885	1886	Forward, quarterback	Served more than 40 years in the U.S. Army, reaching rank of Brigadier General; decorated for bravery in World War I
Greg Morton	1973	1976	Defensive tackle	Selected by ABC as college football defensive player of the year for 1976; played 1 NFL season with the Buffal Bills
Meyer Morton	1910	1910		The annual Meyer Morton Award is named after him.
Jonas Mouton	2007	2010	Linebacker	
Vincent Mroz	1943	1943	End	Served for 26 years in United States Secret Service, shot attempted assassin of Pres. Harry S. Truman in 1950
Stanley Muirhead	1921	1923	Tackle	
Ryan Mundy	2003	2006	Safety	
Ed Muransky	1979	1981	Offensive tackle	
Guy Murdock	1969	1971	Center	Later played for the Houston Oilers, Chicago Fire and Chicago Wind
John Navarre	2000	2003	Quarterback	
Ben Needham	1978	1981	Linebacker	Played for Boston in the USFL; Selected as a 1983 first-team All-League linebacker
Fred Negus	1943	1943	Center	Later played pro football for the Chicago Rockets and Chicago Bears
David M. Nelson	1939	1941	Halfback	Inducted into the College Football Hall of Fame as a coach
Pete Newell	1968	1970	Defensive tackle	Later played for the BC Lions
Harry Newman	1930	1932	Quarterback	Played for the NY Giants, 1933–1935; inducted into College Football Hall of Fame
Walter Niemann	1915	1916	Center	Played for the Green Bay Packers, 1922–1924
Fred Norcross	1903	1905	Quarterback	Later served as head football coach at Oregon State, 1906–1908
Quinn Nordin	2016	2019	Placekicker	Ranked by Scout.com as the No. 1 placekicker in college football's incoming Class of 2016
Dennis Norfleet	2012	2014	Running back	
Stan Noskin	1957	1959	Quarterback	
Frank Nunley	1964	1966	Center, linebacker	
Bob Nussbaumer	1943	1945	Halfback	
Martavious Odoms	2008	2011	Wide receiver	
Joe O'Donnell	1961	1963	Guard	Played 8 years for the Buffalo Bills
David Ojabo	2019	2021	Defensive end	
Eyabi Okie	2022	2022	Defensive end, linebacker	
John O'Korn	2016	2017	Quarterback	
William J. Olcott	1881	1883	Three-quarter back	Captain of 1882 and 1883 teams; later became president of a railway and a mining company
Olusegun Oluwatimi	2022	2022	Center	Rimington and Outland Trophis
Patrick Omameh	2009	2012	Offensive guard	First-team All-Big Ten in 2012
Calvin O'Neal	1974	1976		
Michael Onwenu	2016	2019	Offensive lineman	
Bennie Oosterbaan	1925	1927	End	
Shantee Orr	1999	2002	Linebacker	
Chuck Ortmann	1948	1950	Halfback	
Mark Ortmann	2006	2009	Offensive lineman	
Bill Orwig	1928	1928	End	
Dick O'Shaugnessy	1951	1953	Center	All-Big Ten, 1952
Mel Owens	1977	1980	Linebacker	
Jim Pace	1955	1957	Halfback	
Tony Pape	1999	2003	Offensive lineman	
Bubba Paris	1978	1981	Offensive tackle	
Matt Patanelli	1934	1936	End	
George C. Paterson	1911	1913	Center	
DeWayne Patmon	1997	2000		
Kwity Paye	2017	2020	Defensive end	Second-team All-Big Ten 2019, 2020
Rod Payne	1992	1996	Center	
Dave Pearson	1999	2003	Offensive lineman	
Donovan Peoples-Jones	2017	2019	Wide receiver	
Shonte Peoples	1990	1993	Defensive back, safety	
Jabrill Peppers	2013	2016	Safety	
John Perrin	1917	1921	Halfback	
Chris Perry	2000	2003	Running back	
Lowell W. Perry	1950	1952	End	
Bob Perryman	1982	1986	Fullback	
Brandon Peters	2016	2017	Quarterback	
Don Peterson	1949	1951		
Will Peterson	1997	1999		
Shea Patterson	2018	2019	Quarterback	
Jack Petoskey	1941	1943	End	Later coached football at Hillsdale College and Western Michigan University
Ted Petoskey	1931	1933	End	All-American, 1932, 1933
Frank Albert Picard	1909	1911	Quarterback	Later appointed as a U.S. District Court Judge by Franklin Roosevelt; served 24 years in that capacity
Dick Pierce				
Ondre Pipkins	2012	2014	Defensive tackle	
Otto Pommerening	1927	1928	Tackle	All-American and team MVP, 1928
Irving Kane Pond	1879	1879	Rusher	Scored first touchdown in Michigan history, May 1879; became famous as an architect in the Arts and Crafts movement; three of his buildings are National Historic Landmarks
Joseph Ponsetto	1944	1945	Quarterback	All-Big Ten quarterback, 1944
Miller Pontius	1911	1913	Tackle, end	All-American, 1913
Dave Porter	1964	1967	Guard, tackle	
Ricky Powers	1990	1993	Tailback	
Merv Pregulman	1941	1943	Center, tackle	Played 4 years in NFL; inducted into College Football Hall of Fame
Horace Greely Prettyman	1882	1890		Holds record for most years playing for Michigan's football team (8); Scored the first touchdown in the first game played at Michigan's first home football field in Ann Arbor; later operated a boarding house, power company and Ann Arbor Press; held office as Ann Arbor city councilman, postmaster and Washtenaw County supervisor
Bill Pritula	1942	1947	Tackle	One of Michigan's "Seven Oak Posts" in 1942
Trevor Pryce	1993	1994	Linebacker	
Cecil Pryor	1967	1969	Defensive ends	Later played for the Montreal Alouettes and Memphis Grizzlies
Bob Ptacek	1956	1958	Halfback	
Tom Pullen	1965	1967	End	Played 7 years in the Canadian Football League, including 3 Grey Cup championship teams
Bill Putich	1949	1951	Quarterback, halfback	
Jerry Quaerna	1982	1986	Offensive tackle	
Dave Raimey	1960	1962	Halfback	
Bo Rather	1970	1972	DB, SE	
Fred Ratterman	1932	1933	Quarterback	
Thomas Rawls	2011	2013	Running back	
Marcus Ray	1995	1998	Defensive back	
Tubby Raymond	1946	1948	Quarterback, linebacker	Coach at Delaware, 1966–2001; inducted to College Football Hall of Fame
Russ Reader	1945	1945	Halfback	
Curtis Redden	1900	1903	End	Died while serving in Germany during World War I
Arthur Redner	1900	1901	Halfback	Last-surviving member of Yost's 1901 Point-a-Minute team
John Regeczi	1932	1934	Fullback, halfback	
Fred Rehor	1914	1916	Guard	Played for the 1917 world's professional football champion Massillon Tigers
Andrew G. Reid	1901	1901	Fullback	Later served as head football coach and athletic director at Monmouth College, 1907–1910
Lewis Reimann	1914	1915	Tackle, guard	
Hercules Renda	1937	1939	Halfback	
Rob Renes	1995	1999	Nose tackle	
Art Renner	1943	1946	End	Captain of the 1946 team
William Renner	1931	1935	Quarterback	Captain of the 1935 team
John W. Reynolds, Sr.	1893	1893	Substitute	Later served as Attorney General of Wisconsin; his son became Governor of Wisconsin
Walter Rheinschild	1904	1907	Tackle, fullback	Later served as head football coach at Washington State, Occidental
Clayton Richard	2004	2004	Quarterback	
J. De Forest Richards	1894	1897	Halfback, quarterback	Son of the Governor of Wyoming; later became a bank president in Chicago
Lawrence Ricks	1979	1982	Tailback	
Jay Riemersma	1991	1995	Tight end	
Dick Rifenburg	1944	1948	End	Played for the Detroit Lions, 1950
Rueben Riley	2003	2006	Offensive lineman	
Thomas J. Riley	1908	1908	Guard	Head football coach at Maine (1911–1913), Amherst (1914–1916)
Tony Rio	1957	1959	Fullback	
Jon Ritchie	1993	1994	Fullback	
Stark Ritchie	1935	1937	Halfback	Later became general counsel of the American Petroleum Institute
Garrett Rivas	2004	2006	Placekicker	
Garland Rivers	1983	1986		
Monte Robbins	1984	1987	Punter	
Denard Robinson	2009	2012	Quarterback	In 2010, set the single-season Division I FBS record for rushing yards by a quarterback and became the only player in NCAA history to both pass and rush for 1,500 yards
Don Robinson	1941	1946	Halfback, Quarterback	Assistant football coach at Michigan, 1948–1956
Doug Roby	1921	1922	Fullback, halfback	
Tod Rockwell	1923	1924	Quarterback	Head football coach at North Dakota and Louisiana Tech
Craig Roh	2009	2012	Defensive end	
Rudy Rosatti	1922	1922	Guard	
Carlton Rose	1980	1983	Linebacker	
Rocky Rosema	1965	1967		
Josh Ross	2017	2021	Linebacker	
Roy Roundtree	2009	2012	Wide receiver	Set Michigan's single-game receiving record with nine catches for 246 yards against Illinois in 2010
John Rowser	1963	1966	Halfback	
Jake Rudock	2015	2015	Quarterback	Set Michigan record with 6 touchdown passes in a game
Cesar Ruiz	2017	2019	Offensive lineman	
Jon Runyan	1992	1995	Offensive tackle	
Jon Runyan Jr.	2015	2019	Offensive lineman	
Carl Russ	1972	1974	Linebacker	Later played in the NFL for the Falcons and Jets
Jake Ryan	2011	2014	Linebacker	
Mike Sainristil	2019	2022	Wide receiver Cornerback	
Stephen Schilling	2008	2010	Offensive tackle	
Todd Schlopy	1981	1984	Placekicker	
Michael Schofield	2011	2013	Offensive guard, offensive tackle	
Luke Schoonmaker	2018	2022	Third-team All-Big Ten 2022	
Henry Schulte	1903	1905	Guard, center	Later head football coach at Missouri, Nebraska
Germany Schulz	1904	1908	Center	College Football Hall of Fame
Frederick Schule	1903	1903		Won the gold medal in the 110 meter hurdles at the 1904 Summer Olympics
Joe Schwarz	1956	1956	Center	
S. Spencer Scott	1911	1913	Fullback, tackle	Became the president of Harcourt, Brace & Company
Tom Seabron	1975	1978	Linebacker, defensive end	
Paul Seal	1971	1973	Tight end	
Henry M. Senter	1893	1896	End	Captain of the 1896 team
Fritz Seyferth	1969	1971	Fullback	Later played for the Calgary Stampeders
Paul Seymour	1969	1972	Tight end, offensive tackle	
Michael Shaw	2008	2011	Running back	Rushed for a career-high 127 yards against UMass in 2010
Russell Shaw	1996	1997	Wide receiver	
Walter W. Shaw	1899	1901	Quarterback, halfback	
Ernest Shazor	2002	2004	Defensive back, safety	
Aaron Shea	1996	1999	Tight end, fullback	
Nick Sheridan	2006	2009	Quarterback	
Roger Sherman	1890	1893	Quarterback, end	Head football coach at Iowa, 1894
Bruce Shorts	1900	1901	Tackle	
Ed Shuttlesworth	1971	1973	Fullback	
Quentin Sickels	1944	1948	Guard	Played on Michigan's undefeated 1947 and 1948 national championship teams
Arnie Simkus	1962	1964	Tackle	
Ron Simpkins	1976	1979	Linebacker	
James Simrall	1928	1930	Quarterback, halfback	MVP of the 1929 team and captain of the 1930 team who later attended Harvard Medical School
Doug Skene	1989	1992	Offensive guard	Played for the New England Patriots in 1994
Greg Skrepenak	1987	1991	Offensive line	Two-time All-American; Played five years in the NFL with the Raiders and Panthers
Tom Slade	1971	1973	Quarterback	After Slade's funeral in 2006, Bo Schembechler challenged the current Michigan team to "be as good a Michigan man as Slade"
Edward Slaughter	1922	1924	Guard	All-American 1924; Later worked as an assistant coach at Wisconsin, North Carolina State and Virginia; Head coach of golf team at Virginia 1940–1958
Rudy Smeja	1941	1943	End	Later played three years in the NFL for the Chicago Bears and Philadelphia Eagles
Andrew W. Smith	1909	1909	Guard, center	Later served as head coach at Throop College of Technology (now known as California Institute of Technology) in Pasadena, California
Cedric C. Smith	1915	1917	Fullback	All-American 1917; Played professional football for the Masillon Tigers and Buffalo All-Americans
Charles H. Smith	1893	1894	Line	Omission as an All-American led to criticism that selectors were biased against Western players
De'Veon Smith	2016	2016	Running back	
Frederic L. Smith	1888	1888	Quarterback	Later became a founder of the Olds Motor Works and General Motors and president of the Association of Licensed Automobile Manufacturers
Jim Smith	1973	1976		
Mazi Smith	2019	2022	Defensive tackle	First-team All-Big Ten 2022
Steve Smith (offensive lineman)	1963	1965		
Steve Smith (quarterback)	1980	1983	Quarterback	
Vincent Smith	2009	2012	Running back	First Michigan player to have rushing, passing and receiving touchdowns in one game
Willie Smith	1956	1958	Tackle	Played for the Denver Broncos (1960) and Oakland Raiders (1961)
Neil Snow	1898	1901	End	All-American 1901; College Football Hall of Fame
Wilton Speight	2015	2017	Quarterback	
Joe Soboleski	1945	1948	Guard, tackle	Played 4 years for Chicago Hornets, Washington Redskins, Detroit Lions, New York Yanks, and Dallas Texans
Benjamin H. Southworth	1900	1901	Guard, center	Later became a physician and surgeon in Kalamazoo
Cliff Sparks	1916	1919	Quarterback	All-American in 1916
Wilton Speight	2014	2015	Quarterback	
Ernest Sprague	1886	1887	Guard, rusher	Later gained renown as a contract engineer for the American Bridge Company and Bethlehem Steel
Buster Stanley	1989	1993	Defensive tackle	
Paul Staroba	1968	1970		
Allen Steckle	1897	1899	Tackle	Later served as the head football coach at Nevada and Oregon State
Glen Steele	1994	1997	Defensive end, defensive tackle	
Herb Steger	1922	1924	Halfback	Captain of the 1924 team; Later served as an assistant football coach at Northwestern
Frank Steketee	1918	1921	Halfback, fullback	All-American 1918; Key player on 1918 national championship team; Also a member of Michigan's hockey, swimming and golf teams
Adam Stenavich	2002	2005	Offensive lineman	
Norman Sterry	1900	1902	Halfback, end	Practiced for more than 50 years as a lawyer in Los Angeles; represented the Yankees in a landmark case before the US Supreme Court affirming Major League Baseball's antitrust exemption
Andrew Stueber	2017	2021	Offensive guard	First-team All-Big Ten 2021
Larry Stevens	2000	2003	Defensive back, linebacker	
Tom Stincic	1966	1968	Defensive end	
Darryl Stonum	2008	2010	Wide receiver	
Tai Streets	1995	1998	Wide receiver	
Rich Strenger	1980	1982	Offensive guard, offensive tackle	
Steve Strinko	1972	1974	Linebacker	
Dave Strong	1937	1939	Halfback	Later served as head football coach at South Dakota Mines, Albright, Whitman, and Sacramento State
Theodore M. Stuart	1904	1905	End, halfback	Head football coach at Colorado School of Mines, 1910–1911
Andrew Stueber	2017	2021	Offensive lineman	
Milo Sukup	1938	1940	Guard	Running guard and key blocker for Tom Harmon; later football coach in Grand Rapids 1942–1971
Everett Sweeley	1899	1902	End, fullback	
Sam Sword	1995	1998	Linebacker	
Billy Taylor	1969	1971	Tailback, fullback	
Kip Taylor	1927	1927	End	
Michael Taylor (quarterback)	1985	1989	Quarterback	
Mike Taylor (linebacker)	1969	1971	Linebacker	
Terrance Taylor	2005	2008	Defensive tackle	
Mike Teeter	1986	1989	MG	
Clayton Teetzel	1897	1899	Halfback, end	Coached at Michigan State, BYU and Utah State
Wally Teninga	1945	1949	Halfback	
David Terrell	1998	2000	Wide receiver	
Estel Tessmer	1930	1933	Quarterback	
Anthony Thomas	1997	2000	Running back	
Charles Thomas	1891	1892	Guard	Later coached at Nebraska and Arkansas
Robert Thompson	1979	1982	Linebacker	Played 3 seasons in the NFL for the Buccaneers and Lions
George C. Thomson	1910	1912	Fullback	Leading scorer, 1911; Captain, 1912; President of Michigan Trust Company, 1933–1956
Bob Thornbladh	1971	1973	Fullback, linebacker	
Dick Thornton	1927	1927		
Steven Threet	2008	2008	Quarterback	Starting QB for Michigan in 2008 and for Arizona State in 2010
Bob Timberlake	1962	1964	Quarterback	Chicago Tribune Silver Football Trophy, 1964; All-American, 1964; Played in NFL for New York Giants (1965)
Bob Timm	1950	1952	Guard	All-Big Ten, 1952
Dominic Tomasi	1945	1948	Guard	Captain and Most Valuable Player of the National Champion 1948 Michigan Wolverines football team
Amani Toomer	1992	1995	Wide receiver	First-team All-Big Ten (1994); Played in NFL for the New York Giants (1996–2008)
Ted Topor	1950	1952	Quarterback, linebacker	Michigan Wolverines Most Valuable Player, 1952
Bob Topp	1952	1953	End	
Roy Torbet	1911	1913	End, fullback, halfback	
Fitzgerald Toussaint	2010	2013	Running back	
Brian Townsend	1987	1991	Linebacker	Director of Michigan's basketball operations since 2007; also assistant athletic director under Dave Brandon
Fred Townsend	1887	1887	Tackle	Later served as an Iowa state senator and chairman of the Iowa Democratic Party state committee
Morgan Trent	2005	2008		
Mike Trgovac	1977	1980	Defensive guard	All-Big Ten and second-team All-American; Defensive coordinator for Carolina Panthers 2003–2008
Fred Trosko	1937	1939	Halfback	Meyer Morton Award in 1937; head football coach at Eastern Michigan, 1952–64
Joseph Truskowski	1926	1929	End	Later football coach at Olivet College and head baseball coach at Iowa State and Wayne State
Jerame Tuman	1995	1998	Tight end	All-Big Ten, 1996, 1997, and 1998. All-American, 1997.
Virgil Tupper	1891	1892	Guard	
D. J. Turner	2019	2022	Cornerback	
Josh Uche	2016	2019	Linebacker	
Eddie Usher	1918	1921	Fullback, halfback	Played 3 years in the NFL for the All-Americans, Independents, Packers and Blues
Irwin Uteritz	1921	1923	Quarterback	All-American, 1922; Led Michigan to back-to-back undefeated seasons and 1923 national championship; Later served as a football and baseball coach at Northwestern, Wisconsin, Cal, and Washington University in St. Louis
Arthur Valpey	1935	1937	End	Later served as head football coach at Harvard and Connecticut
Ryan Van Bergen	2008	2011	Defensive lineman	
James Van Inwagen	1888	1891	Halfback, fullback, end	Captain of the 1891 Michigan team; Played at end in 1888, fullback in 1889 and halfback in 1891
Jim Van Pelt	1955	1957	Quarterback	Played 2 seasons in the CFL with the Blue Bombers; Set CFL records with 7 TD passes in 1 game and a 107-yard TD pass; Scored a record 22 points in 1958 Grey Cup
Jon Vaughn	1988	1990	Tailback	Big Ten Co-Offensive Player of the Year, 1990; Played 4 seasons in the NFL with the Patriots, Seahawks and Chiefs
Dick Vick	1923	1923	Fullback	Later played in the NFL with the Detroit Panthers; brother of Ernie Vick
Ernie Vick	1918	1921	Center	All-American, 1921; Inducted into College Football Hall of Fame in 1983; Played Major League Baseball for the Cardinals 1922–1926; Played 3 years in the NFL with the Panthers, Bears and Wolverines
Dick Vidmer	1965	1967	Quarterback	Set Michigan record with 2,400 passing yards (now ranks 15th)
Luiji Vilain	2017	2020	Linebacker	
Giovanni Raphael Frank "Count" Villa	1893	1896	Tackle	Star for Michigan teams that went 33-6-1 from 1893–1896; Assistant football coach 1897–1898
Jason Vinson	1996	1997	Punter	
John Vitale	1985	1988	Center	All-American, 1988; Played in the WFL for the San Antonio Riders and Detroit Drive
Rick Volk	1964	1966	Safety, cornerback, halfback, quarterback, fullback	All-American,1966; Played 12 years in the NFL for the Colts, Giants and Dolphins; 4-time All-Pro
Robert Wahl	1948	1950	Defensive tackle, offensive tackle	All-American, 1949 and 1950; Blocked punt to win the 1950 Snow Bowl
Kerwin Waldroup	1993	1994	Linebacker	Played 3 years in the NFL with the Lions
Art Walker	1952	1954	Tackle	All-American, 1954; Played 3 years in the CFL for the Eskimos; 1957 CFL All-Star
Derrick Walker	1986	1989	Tight end	All-Big Ten, 1989; Played 10 years in the NFL for the Chargers, Chiefs and Raiders
Kareem Walker	2016	2017	Running back	Rated by ESPN and 247Sports.com as the No. 1 running back in the class of 2016
Marquise Walker	1999	2001	Wide receiver	All-American, 2001; MVP 2001 Michigan football team; Played 1 year in the NFL for the Buccaneers
John Wangler	1977	1980	Quarterback	Co-MVP 1979 Gator Bowl; Led Michigan to 1980 Big Ten championship and victory in 1981 Rose Bowl
Carl Ward	1964	1966	Halfback	Played 3 seasons in the NFL for the Cleveland Browns, New Orleans Saints
Willis Ward	1932	1934		Three-time All-American in track and field; NCAA high jump champion; Second African-American to earn varsity letter in football at Michigan; Georgia Tech refused to play Michigan in 1934 if Ward played
Donovan Warren	2007	2009	Cornerback	All-Big Ten, 2009
Billy Wasmund	1907	1909	Quarterback	Head football coach at Texas in 1910; Died from a fall prior to start of 1911 season
James K. Watkins	1905	1909	Tackle, center, fullback	Served as Detroit police commissioner in the early 1930s
Brandon Watson	2015	2018	Defensive back	
Gabe Watson	2002	2005	Defensive tackle	All-Big Ten, 2005; Played in the NFL with the Cardinals starting in 2006
Harold Watts	1943	1946	Center	MVP 1945 Michigan team; All-Big Ten, 1945
Andre Weathers	1996	1998	Cornerback	All-Big Ten, 1997; Played 2 years in the NFL with the Giants
Wally Weber	1925	1927	Halfback, fullback	Later served as an assistant football coach at Michigan for 28 years
Alanson Weeks	1898	1898	Fullback	Fullback for the 1898 championship team; Later worked as a surgeon in San Francisco; decorated for service as a surgeon at the front in World War I
Boss Weeks	1900	1902	Quarterback	Quarterback of the 1901 "Point-a-Minute" team; Later served as a head football coach at Kansas and Beloit
Jack Weisenburger	1944	1947	Fullback, halfback, quarterback	Starting fullback for the 1947 "Mad Magicians" team
Tripp Welborne	1988	1990	Safety	All-American, 1990; MVP 1990 Michigan team; Played 1 year in the NFL with the Vikings
Stanfield Wells	1909	1911	End, halfback, tackle	All-American 1910
Bob Westfall	1939	1941	Fullback	All-American, 1941; Played 4 years in the NFL with the Lions; All-Pro in 1945; Inducted into College Football Hall of Fame in 1987
Archie Weston	1917	1919	Quarterback, halfback	All-American, 1917
Tyrone Wheatley	1991	1994	Tailback	All-Big Ten 1992, 1994; Ranks 4th at Michigan with 4,178 rushing yards; Big Ten Offensive Player of the Year, 1992; All-American in track, 1995; Played 10 years in the NFL with the Giants and Raiders
Jack Wheeler	1928	1930	Halfback, fullback, quarterback	MVP 1930 Michigan team; Finished 2nd in voting for 1930 Chicago Tribune Silver Football as Big Ten MVP
Gerald White	1983	1986	Fullback	Played 1 year in the NFL for the Cowboys
Hugh White	1898	1901	Tackle, end	Captain of the 1901 "Point-a-Minute" team
J. T. White	1946	1947	Center	2nd team All-American 1947; Played for Big Ten championship teams at Michigan (1947) and Ohio State (1942); Later served as an assistant coach and assistant athletic director at Penn State
Paul White	1941	1946	Halfback	Played 1 year in the NFL for the Steelers
James Whitley	1997	2000	Cornerback, punt returner	Co-captain 2000 Michigan team
Charles Widman	1898	1898	Halfback	Leading scorer on undefeated 1898 team
Tad Wieman	1915	1920	End, tackle, fullback	Later coached at Michigan, Princeton; Athletic director at Maine and Denver; Inducted into College Football Hall of Fame in 1956
Bob Wiese	1942	1946	Fullback, quarterback	Played 2 years in the NFL with the Lions
Thomas Wilcher	1983	1986	Tailback	NCAA champion in indoor 55 m hurdles; 3-time All-American in track and field; Set Michigan records in 60-meter high hurdles and 110-meter hurdles
Matt Wile	2011	2014	Placekicker, Punter	2011 ESPN.com and BTN.com Big Ten All-Freshman
F. Stuart Wilkins	1945	1948	Guard	Founding director and chairman of the board (1984–1997) of the Pro Football Hall of Fame in Canton, Ohio; Served as chairman of the board of the American Automobile Association
Brandon Williams	1999	2002	Cornerback	Played 6 years in the NFL with the Falcons, Giants and Bengals
Clarence Williams	1995	1998	Tailback	Played 2 years in the NFL for the Cardinals
Josh Williams	1996	1999	Defensive tackle	Played 6 years in the NFL for the Colts
Maurice Williams	1997	2000	Offensive tackle, offensive guard	Played 9 seasons in the NFL for the Jaguars
Ivy Williamson	1930	1932	End	Captain of the undefeated national champion 1932 team; Later served as head football coach and athletic director at Wisconsin
Ebin Wilson	1899	1901	Guard	Played on the 1901 Point-a-Minute team; Later served as head football coach at Wabash and Alma Colleges
Eric Wilson	1997	2000	Defensive tackle	Played 9 seasons in the NFL and CFL for the Dolphins, Blue Bombers, Roughriders and Alouettes
Hugh E. Wilson	1918	1921	Guard	Later served as the head football coach at Louisiana Tech and head basketball coach at LSU
Roman Wilson	2020	2022	Wide receiver	
Jack Wink	1943	1943	Quarterback	Also played at Wisconsin (1942, 1946–1947); head football coach at Wayne State (NE), Wisconsin–Stout, St. Cloud State
Chase Winovich	2014	2018	Defensive end	
Chuck Winters	1992	1996	Safety	Played 6 years in the CFL for the Argonauts
Al Wistert	1940	1942	Tackle	All-American, 1942; MVP 1942 Michigan team; Inducted into College Football Hall of Fame, 1967; His No. 11 is 1 of 5 retired numbers at Michigan; Played 9 years in the NFL for the Steagles and Eagles; 8-time All-Pro
Alvin Wistert	1947	1949	Tackle	All-American, 1948 and 1949; Inducted into College Football Hall of Fame, 1967; Oldest college football player ever selected as an All-American at age 33; His No. 11 is 1 of 5 retired numbers at Michigan
Whitey Wistert	1931	1933	Tackle	All-American, 1933; Inducted into College Football Hall of Fame, 1967; MVP in the Big Ten in baseball, 1934; Played Major League Baseball for the Reds in 1937; His No. 11 is 1 of 5 retired numbers at Michigan
Irv Wisniewski	1946	1949	End	Later coached football and basketball at Hillsdale College and the University of Delaware
John Wombacher	1895	1896	Center	Elected captain of the 1897 team but unable to play after contracting typhoid fever
LaMarr Woodley	2003	2006	Defensive end, linebacker	Lombardi Award winner, 2006; Ted Hendricks Award winner, 2006; All-American, 2006; Played in the NFL with the Steelers since 2007; Pro Bowl, 2009
Pierre Woods	2002	2005	Linebacker	Played in the NFL with the Patriots since 2006
Charles Woodson	1995	1997	Cornerback	1997 Heisman Trophy winner; Played in the NFL since 1998 with the Raiders and Packers
Butch Woolfolk	1978	1981	Tailback	All-American 1981; MVP 1981 Michigan team; MVP 1981 Rose Bowl; Set Michigan's all-time record with 3,850 career rushing yards (now ranks 5th); Played 7 years in the NFL with the Giants, Oilers, and Lions
Bill Yearby	1963	1965	Defensive tackle	Two-time All-American; MVP 1965 Michigan team; Played 1 year in the NFL for the Jets
Howard Yerges	1944	1947	Quarterback	Played for Ohio State in 1943; Quarterback of the undefeated 1947 team known as the "Mad Magicians"; All-Big Ten 1947
Harry Young	1912	1912	halfback	Played freshman football at UM before transfer to Washington & Lee; Inducted into College Football Hall of Fame in 1958
Roger Zatkoff	1950	1952	Linebacker, fullback, offensive tackle	All-Big Ten 1952; Played 6 years in the NFL for the Packers and Lions
Chris Ziemann	1996	1999	Offensive guard, offensive tackle	Played 1 year in the NFL for the Giants
Zak Zinter	2020	2022	Offensive guard	First-team All-Big Ten 2022
Chris Zurbrugg	1984	1986	Quarterback	Starting QB in last half of 1984 season; set single-game record for passing yards in his second start

== See also ==
- University of Michigan Athletic Hall of Honor
