= History of Michigan Wolverines football in the Oosterbaan years =

Michigan Wolverines football
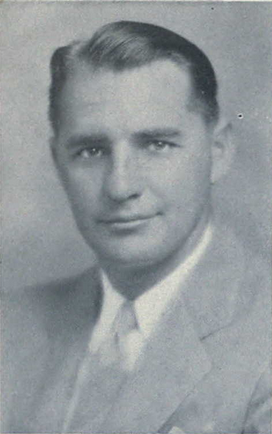
- Athletic director: Fritz Crisler
- Head coach: Bennie Oosterbaan; 11 season, 63–33–4 (.650)
- Location: Ann Arbor, Michigan
- Stadium: Michigan Stadium
- Conference: Big Ten Conference
- Colors: Maize and blue
- Bowl record: 1–0 (1.000)

National championships
- Claimed: 1

Conference championships
- 3

The History of Michigan Wolverines football in the Oosterbaan years covers the history of the University of Michigan Wolverines football program during the period from the promotion of Bennie Oosterbaan as head coach in 1948 through his firing after the 1958 season. Michigan was a member of the Big Ten Conference during the Oosterbaan years and played its home games at Michigan Stadium.

During the 11 years in which Oosterbaan served as head football coach, Michigan compiled a record of 63–33–4 (.650). In Oosterbaan's first year as head coach, the 1948 team compiled a perfect 9–0 and won a national championship. The team won Big Ten Conference championships in each of Oosterbaan's first three years as head coach. In 1950, Michigan defeated Ohio State 9 to 3 in the legendary Snow Bowl game and went on to defeat California by a 14 to 6 score in the 1951 Rose Bowl.

After compiling a 2–6–1 record (1–5–1 Big Ten) record in 1958, and finishing in eighth place in the Big Ten, Oosterbaan was fired and replaced by Bump Elliott. Three players from the Oosterbaan years have been inducted into the College Football Hall of Fame. They are Pete Elliott, Alvin Wistert, and Ron Kramer.

== Year-by-year results ==
Season	Place	Record	PF	PA	Captain	MVP
1948 team	1st	9–0	252	44	Dominic Tomasi	Dominic Tomasi
1949 team	1st (tie)	6–2–1	135	85	Alvin Wistert	Dick Kempthorn
1950 team	1st	6–3–1	150	114	Robert Wahl	Don Dufek, Sr.
1951 team	4th	4–5	135	122	Bill Putich	Don Peterson
1952 team	4th (tie)	5–4	207	134	Merritt Green	Ted Topor
1953 team	5th (tie)	6–3	163	101	Dick O'Shaughnessy	Tony Branoff
1954 team	2nd (tie)	6–3	139	87	Ted Cachey	Fred Baer
1955 team	3rd	7–2	179	94	Ed Meads	Terry Barr
1956 team	2nd	7–2	233	123	Tom Maentz	Dick Hill
1957 team	6th	5–3–1	187	147	Jim Orwig	Jim Pace
1958 team	8th	2–6–1	132	211	John Herrnstein	Bob Ptacek

== 1948 national championship ==
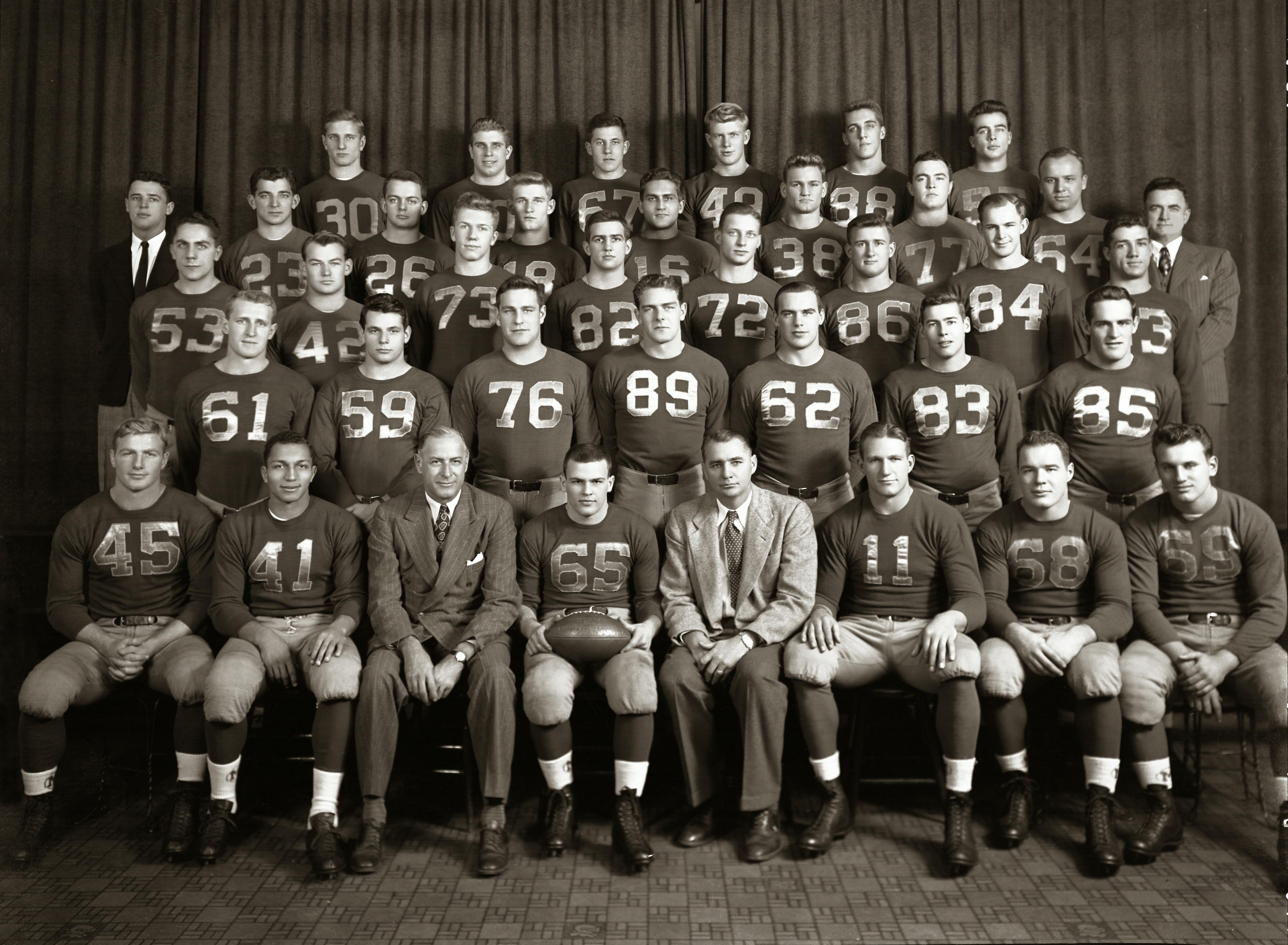
1948 national championship team

In 1948, under first-year head coach Bennie Oosterbaan, Michigan compiled a 9–0 record, defeated six ranked opponents by a combined score of 122–17, and won both the Big Nine Conference and national football championships. In the final AP Poll, Michigan received 192 first place votes, twice as many as second-place Notre Dame which garnered 97 first place votes.

The 1948 season was Michigan's second straight undefeated, untied season. After Fritz Crisler led the 1947 team to a perfect 10–0 record, the Wolverines entered the 1948 season with a 14-game winning streak dating back to October 1946. Despite the loss of all four backfield starters from the 1947 team (including Big Nine MVP Bump Elliott and Heisman Trophy runner-up Bob Chappuis), the 1948 team extended the winning streak to 23 games.

On offense, Michigan was led by a new backfield that included All-American quarterback Pete Elliott and halfbacks Chuck Ortmann and Leo Koceski. The team scored 252 points, an average of 28 points per game. With Ortmann as the principal passer, the Wolverines relied on an air attack, gaining more yards in the air (1,355) than on the ground (1,262). Dick Rifenburg, the team's leading receiver, was picked as a first-team All-American at the end position. Team captain Dominic Tomasi was selected as the team's Most Valuable Player. The 1949 Michiganensian wrote of the 250-pound guard, "Famous for his sharp shattering blocking, Dom tore huge gaps in the opposing lines to pave the way for Michigan's steam roller offense."

On defense, the Wolverines allowed only 44 points, an average of 4.8 points per game. The defense was led by tackles Alvin Wistert and Al Wahl, center Dan Dworsky, and fullback Dick Kempthorn. The team shut out Oregon despite the passing game of College and Pro Football Hall of Fame quarterback Norm Van Brocklin. It also held ranked Purdue and Northwestern teams to 36 and 47 rushing yards, respectively. The defense forced a total of 32 turnovers (including 21 interceptions), an average of three-and-a-half turnovers per game.

== Rivalries ==
=== Michigan State ===
During the Oosterbaan years, Michigan compiled a 4-6-1 record in the Michigan – Michigan State football rivalry. Oosterbaan became the first head coach in Michigan history to compile a losing record against the Spartans.

=== Minnesota ===
During the Oosterbaan years, Michigan compiled an 8-2-1 record in its annual Little Brown Jug rivalry game with the Minnesota Golden Gophers.

=== Notre Dame ===
Michigan and Notre Dame did not play each other during the Oosterbaan years. After playing against each other in 1942 and 1943, the programs did not meet again until 1978.

=== Ohio State ===
During the Oosterbaan years, Michigan compiled a 5-5-1 record in the Michigan–Ohio State football rivalry. Significant games during the Oosterbaan years include:

- 1948 – Michigan concluded an undefeated season and secured the national championship with a 13–3 win over Ohio State in Columbus. The game was played in front of a crowd of 82,754 spectators – the second largest crowd in Ohio Stadium history up to that time. Although Michigan was favored in the game by 14 points, Ohio State dominated the line of scrimmage in the first half, allowing only three first downs by Michigan, one of which came on a penalty. Ohio State took a 3–0 lead in the first quarter on a 26-yard field goal by Jim Hague. The kick followed a fumble recovery by Jack Lininger after an errant lateral by Chuck Ortmann. Michigan took the lead in the second quarter on a 92-yard drive culminating with a 44-yard touchdown pass from Ortmann to Harry Allis. In the fourth quarter, Michigan drove 62 yards for a second touchdown led by the passing of Wally Teninga and Pete Elliott. The touchdown was scored by fullback Tom Peterson. Allis converted the first extra point, but missed on the second. Ohio State outgained Michigan on the ground 130 yards to 54, but Michigan outgained Ohio State in the air 116 yards to 73.
- 1949 – The teams came into the game ranked #5 and #7 in the AP Poll and played to a 7–7 at Michigan Stadium. With the tie, the teams finished as Big Ten Conference co-champions.
- Snow Bowl (1950) – On November 25, 1950, Michigan defeated the Ohio State Buckeyes, 9–3, earning the Big Ten Conference championship and a berth in the 1951 Rose Bowl. The game was played at Ohio Stadium under severe winter conditions, including snow and wind, that altered the normal playing of the game dramatically. Michigan won the game despite never getting a first down and failing on all nine pass attempts. The teams punted 45 times, sometimes on first down. The strategy was based on the weather in that both teams felt it better to have the ball in the hands of their opponents near the end zone and hope for a fumble of the slippery ball. The game became famous because of the weather and the difficulty of playing football when the players can't see the lines on the field. The Buckeyes' first and only score was Vic Janowicz kicking a field goal, after Robert Momsen recovered a blocked Wolverine kick. Michigan scored on a blocked kick that rolled out of the end zone for a safety. With 47 seconds remaining in the first half, Tony Momsen of Michigan blocked a Buckeye punt and fell on it in the end zone for a touchdown and the final score of 9–3.
- 1951 – In the first year of the Woody Hayes era, the Wolverines defeated the Buckeyes 7–0 at Michigan Stadium.
- 1958 – In the final game of the Oosterbaan years, Ohio State defeated Michigan 20–14 at Ohio Stadium.

== Coaching staff and administration ==
=== Assistant coaches ===
- Jack Blott – assistant coach, 1924–1933, 1946–1958 (head football coach at Wesleyan, 1934–1940)
- George Ceithaml – assistant coach, 1947–1952
- Don Dufek, Sr. – player, 1948–1950; assistant coach, 1954–1965
- Bump Elliott – assistant coach, 1957–1958 (head coach 1959–1968)
- Robert Holloway – assistant coach 1954–1965
- Cliff Keen – assistant coach 1926–1930, 1932–1936, 1941, 1946–1958 (also Michigan's wrestling coach, 1925–1970)
- Pete Kinyon – assistant coach 1954–1956
- Ernie McCoy, 1940–1942, 1945–1951 (also Michigan's head basketball coach, 1948–1952; athletic director at Penn State, 1952–1970)
- Bill Orwig – assistant coach 1948–1953
- Matt Patanelli – assistant coach 1953–1958
- Don Robinson, 1948–1956
- Wally Weber – assistant coach, 1931–1958
- J. T. White – assistant coach, 1948–1955

=== Others ===
- Ralph W. Aigler – chairman of Michigan's Faculty Board in Control of Athletics, 1917–1942, faculty representative to the Big Ten Conference, 1917–1955
- Fritz Crisler – athletic director, 1941–1968
- Jim Hunt – trainer, 1947–1967
- Marcus Plant – University of Michigan's faculty representative to the National Collegiate Athletic Association and the Big Ten Conference, 1954–1978

== Players ==
Name	Start Year	Last Year	Position(s)	Notes
Harry Allis	1948	1950	End, Placekicker	Big Ten scoring leader, 1948
Fred Baer	1952	1954	Fullback	MVP, 1954 Michigan football team
Terry Barr	1954	1956	Halfback	Played 9 seasons in the NFL with the Lions; Two-time Pro Bowl selection
Lou Baldacci	1953	1955	Quarterback, Fullback	Set Michigan record for longest field goal, 1953; Played 1 year in the NFL with the Steelers
Tony Branoff	1952	1955	Halfback	MVP 1953 Michigan football team; Leading rusher for Michigan, 1953 and 1955
Jerry Burns	1947	1950	Quarterback	Later became head coach at University of Iowa and in NFL for the Packers and Vikings
Gene Derricotte	1946	1948	Halfback, Quarterback	Holds Michigan's single season record for punt return average
Donald R. Deskins	1958	1959	Tackle	Played in all 14 games for the Oakland Raiders in their first season (1960); later became an author and professor of urban geography and sociology
Don Dufek, Sr.	1948	1950	Fullback	
Dan Dworsky	1945	1948	Fullback, Center, Quarterback	
Don Eaddy	1951	1951	Halfback	All-American in baseball; later played Major League Baseball with the Cubs in 1959
James Eldridge	1948	1950	Halfback	later changed his first name to Æthelred and became a celebrated artist and professor at Ohio University
Pete Elliott	1945	1948	Quarterback, Halfback	
George Genyk	1957	1959	Guard, Tackle	1959 team captain; drafted by New York Titans in the first AFL draft
John Ghindia	1947	1949	Quarterback, Fullback, Halfback	
Darrell Harper	1957	1959	Halfback	
John Herrnstein	1956	1958	Fullback	Later played Major League Baseball from 1962 to 1966 with the Phillies, Cubs and Braves
Dick Hill	1954	1956	Guard	MVP of the 1956 team; played one season with the Montreal Alouettes
Bob Hollway	1947	1949	End	Later served as head coach of the St. Louis Cardinals, 1971–1972
Tom Johnson	1948	1951	Tackle	Most valuable defensive tackle in the Big Ten, 1950; First-team All-American, 1951; Second African-American to play for the Green Bay Packers
Fred Julian	1957	1959	Defensive back	Leading rusher for UM 1959; led New York Titans in interceptions 1960
Zeno Karcz	1954	1954	Linebacker, Running back	Later played for the Hamilton Tiger-Cats for 9 years; Won the 1965 Most Outstanding Canadian award
Dick Kempthorn	1947	1949	Fullback	MVP 1949 Michigan team; Won Distinguished Flying Cross as a jet fighter pilot in the Korean War
Gene Knutson	1951	1953	End	
Leo Koceski	1948	1950	Halfback	Known as the "Canonsburg Comet"; Played for undefeated 1948 national championship team
Ralph Kohl	1947	1948	Tackle	Later coached at Eastern Illinois and was head scout for the Minnesota Vikings
Ron Kramer	1955	1956	End	All-American, 1955–1956; Played 10 years in NFL for Packers and Lions; First-team All Pro, 1962; Inducted into College Football Hall of Fame, 1978
Ted Kress	1951	1953	Halfback	
Jim Maddock	1954	1956	Quarterback	
Tom Maentz	1954	1956	End	
Jerry Marciniak	1956	1958	Tackle	Played in the CFL for the Saskatchewan Roughriders
Ed Meads	1953	1955	Guard	Captain of the 1955 team; awarded Bronze Star for work as combat surgeon in Vietnam War
Tony Momsen	1945	1950	Center	Played for the Pittsburgh Steelers and Washington Redskins
John Morrow	1953	1955	Center, Tackle	
Stan Noskin	1957	1959	Quarterback	
Chuck Ortmann	1948	1950	Halfback	
Dick O'Shaugnessy	1951	1953	Center	All-Big Ten, 1952
Jim Pace	1955	1957	Halfback	
Lowell W. Perry	1950	1952	End	
Don Peterson	1949	1951		
Bob Ptacek	1956	1958	Halfback	
Bill Putich	1949	1951	Quarterback, Halfback	
Tubby Raymond	1946	1948	Quarterback, Linebacker	Coach at Delaware, 1966–2001; inducted to College Football Hall of Fame
Dick Rifenburg	1944	1948	End	Played for the Detroit Lions, 1950
Tony Rio	1957	1959	Fullback	
Joe Schwarz	1956	1956	Center	
Quentin Sickels	1944	1948	Guard	Played on Michigan's undefeated 1947 and 1948 national championship teams
Willie Smith	1956	1958	Tackle	Played for the Denver Broncos (1960) and Oakland Raiders (1961)
Joe Soboleski	1945	1948	Guard, Tackle	Played 4 years for Chicago Hornets, Washington Redskins, Detroit Lions, New York Yanks, and Dallas Texans
Wally Teninga	1945	1949	Halfback	
Bob Timm	1950	1952	Guard	All-Big Ten, 1952
Dominic Tomasi	1945	1948	Guard	Captain and Most Valuable Player of the National Champion 1948 Michigan Wolverines football team
Ted Topor	1950	1952	Quarterback, Linebacker	Michigan Wolverines Most Valuable Player, 1952
Bob Topp	1952	1953	End	
Jim Van Pelt	1955	1957	Quarterback	Played 2 seasons in the CFL with the Blue Bombers; Set CFL records with 7 TD passes in 1 game and a 107-yard TD pass; Scored a record 22 points in 1958 Grey Cup
Robert Wahl	1948	1950	Defensive tackle, Offensive tackle	All-American, 1949 and 1950; Blocked punt to win the 1950 Snow Bowl
Art Walker	1952	1954	Tackle	All-American, 1954; Played 3 years in the CFL for the Eskimos; 1957 CFL All-Star
F. Stuart Wilkins	1945	1948	Guard	Founding director and chairman of the board (1984–1997) of the Pro Football Hall of Fame in Canton, Ohio; Served as chairman of the board of the American Automobile Association
Irv Wisniewski	1946	1949	End	Later coached football and basketball at Hillsdale College and the University of Delaware
Alvin Wistert	1947	1949	Tackle	All-American, 1948 and 1949; Inducted into College Football Hall of Fame, 1967; Oldest college football player ever selected as an All-American at age 33; His No. 11 is 1 of 5 retired numbers at Michigan
Roger Zatkoff	1950	1952	Linebacker, Fullback, Offensive tackle	All-Big Ten 1952; Played 6 years in the NFL for the Packers and Lions
