= Meyer Morton =

American football player, official, and lawyer (1889–1948)

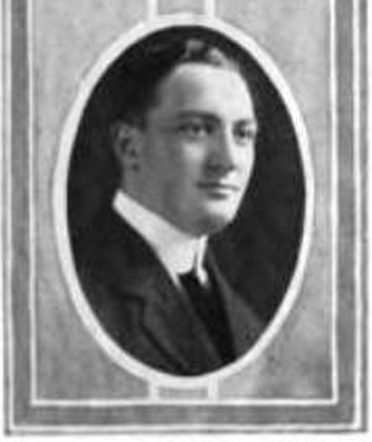
- Morton from the 1912 Michiganensian
- Born: Myer Isakovitz; November 20, 1889; Chicago, Illinois
- Died: February 8, 1948 (aged 58); Chicago, Illinois
- Citizenship: United States
- Education: University of Michigan

Meyer Morton, born Myer Isakovitz (November 20, 1889 – February 8, 1948) was an American football player and official and lawyer from Chicago, Illinois.

== Early years ==
Morton was born in November 1889 in Chicago. His birth name was Myer Isakovitz. His parents, Martin "Max" Morton and Elizabeth "Bessie" (Schreier) Morton, were Russian Jews, his parents immigrating between 1879 and 1882. They became naturalized U.S. citizens in 1890.

At the time of the 1900 United States census, the family's last name was recorded as "Isacovitz." At the time of the 1910 United States census, the family had changed its name to Morton and was living in Troy, New York. The father was employed as a salesman at a dry goods store.

== University of Michigan ==
Morton enrolled at the University of Michigan and received a law degree as part of the Class of 1912. While attending Michigan, he played on the freshman baseball and track teams. He was also a reserve player on the undefeated 1910 Michigan Wolverines football team as a sophomore and a member of the class football team as a junior.

== Legal and officiating career ==
After graduating from Michigan, Morton returned to Chicago and worked as a lawyer there from 1915 to 1948. At the time of World War I, Morton was single, living in Chicago and working as a self-employed lawyer. He was serving as a private in the National Guard, Illinois - 1st Cavalry.

Morton also worked on Saturdays as a game official for the Big Ten Conference for 23 years from the 1920s to the 1940s. After serving as the head linesman a game between Notre Dame and Northwestern in October 1926, Morton was criticized by Knute Rockne who felt that Morton had over-penalized the Fighting Irish team. Rockne recalled it was "the only time in my life I ever got sore at an official" and felt it was unfair that Michigan coach Fielding H. Yost was picking game officials for Notre Dame. In his history of the Michigan - Notre Dame rivalry, John Kryk wrote:

Meyer Morton, as Rockne well knew, was a Conference man. Worse, a Michigan man. Still worse, a Yost man. Indeed, Morton was a prominent member of the University of Michigan Club of Chicago, and his correspondence with Yost and others dot the Michigan files of the 1920s and 1930s.

== Later years and death ==
At the time of World War II, Morton was living in Chicago and working for the Chicago Flexible Shaft Co., a manufacturer of electrical appliances that later became known as Sunbeam Products.

Morton died in 1948 in Chicago.

== Meyer Morton Award ==
During his lifetime, Morton was one of the leading members of the "M" Club of Chicago. In 1925, the club began a tradition of giving an award each year to the Michigan football player who showed "the greatest development and most promise as a result of the annual spring practice." For many years, Morton traveled from Chicago to present the award in Ann Arbor. Beginning in 1948, after Morton's death, the annual award was renamed the Meyer Morton Award.

The award has been presented to many of the legends in Michigan football history, including Gerald R. Ford (1932), Ron Kramer (1954), Jim Harbaugh (1984), and Desmond Howard (1991). A complete list of the past winners is set forth below.

Year	Player	Year	Player	Year	Player	Year	Player
1925	Ray Baer	1950	Roger Zatkoff	1973	Paul Seal	1996	Damon Denson
1926	George Rich	1951	Merritt Green	1974	Dennis Franklin	1997	Clint Copenhaver
1927	LaVerne Taylor	1952	Gene Knutson	1975	Dan Jilek	1998	Tai Streets
1928	Danny Holmes	1953	Don Dugger; Tony Branoff	1976	Greg Morton	1999	Grady Brooks
1929	Roy Hudson	1954	Ron Kramer	1977	John Anderson	2000	Jeff Backus
1930	Estel Tessmer	1955	Jim Van Pelt	1978	Gene Johnson	2001	Bill Seymour
1931	Herman Everhardus	1956	John Herrnstein; Bob Ptacek	1979	Curtis Greer	2002	Victor Hobson
1932	Gerald R. Ford	1957	Charles Teusher	1980	George Lilja	2003	John Navarre
1933	Mike Savage	1958	Dick Syring	1981	Stan Edwards	2004	Braylon Edwards
1934	Matt Patanelli	1959	Willard Hildebrand	1982	Stefan Humphries	2005	Tim Massaquoi
1935	Bob Cooper	1960	Bill Freehan	1983	Steve Smith	2006	Steve Breaston
1936	John Jordan	1961	Dave Raimey	1984	Jim Harbaugh	2007	Chad Henne
1937	Fred Trosko	1962	John Minko	1985	Clay Miller	2008	Will Johnson
1938	Archie Kodros	1963	Tom Keating	1986	Doug Mallory	2009	Stevie Brown
1939	Ralph Fritz	1964	Tom Mack	1987	Jamie Morris	2010	Greg Banks
1940	George Ceithaml	1965	Bill Keating	1988	John Vitale	2011	John McColgan
1941	Merv Pregulman	1966	Donald A. Bailey	1989	Chris Calloway	2012	Brennen Beyer
1942	Bob Wiese	1967	Dick Yanz	1990	Matt Elliott	2013	James Ross III
1943	Clem Bauman	1968	Bob Baumgartner	1991	Desmond Howard	2014	Joe Bolden
1946	Bob Ballou	1969	Don Moorhead	1992	Chris Hutchinson		
1947	Alvin Wistert	1970	Jim Betts	1993	Todd Collins		
1948	Leo Koceski	1971	Guy Murdock	1994	Jay Riemersma		
1949	Don Dufek	1972	Randy Logan	1995	Jarrett Irons		
