= Don Coleman (linebacker) =

American football player (born 1952)

No. 55
- Position: Linebacker

Personal information
- Born: January 11, 1952 (age 74); Toledo, Ohio, U.S.
- Listed height: 6 ft 2 in (1.88 m)
- Listed weight: 222 lb (101 kg)

Career information
- High school: St. John's Jesuit (Toledo)
- College: Michigan
- NFL draft: 1974: 16th round, 398th overall pick

Career history
- New Orleans Saints (1974–1975); New York Jets (1976–1977)

Awards and highlights
- Second-team All-Big Ten (1973)
- Stats at Pro Football Reference

Donald Alvin Coleman (born January 11, 1952) is an American former professional football player. He played college football at the University of Michigan from 1971 to 1973 and professionally for the New Orleans Saints and New York Jets from 1974 to 1978. He is the founder of the advertising agency GlobalHue.

== Early life ==
Coleman was born in Toledo, Ohio in 1952, and grew up in that city's Old West End neighborhood. His mother, Dorothy Coleman, worked for the Department of Housing and Urban Development, and his father, Augustus Coleman, worked as a skycap for United Airlines and as a janitor at a library.

At the suggestion of teachers at his public school, who told his parents that Coleman was not sufficiently challenged, he transferred to St. John's Jesuit High School and Academy. He attended St. John's from 1966 to 1970 where he excelled in academics and sports. Coleman was an All-City and All-State running back for St. John's and was recruited by multiple colleges to play football. He later recalled: "When it came time to select a university, I had about 20 coaches visiting the house, talking up their programs. I chose the University of Michigan. I received a full scholarship."

== College career ==
Coleman enrolled at the University of Michigan in 1970 on a football scholarship. He played college football for the Michigan Wolverines under head coach Bo Schembechler from 1971 to 1973. Coleman began the 1971 season as a backup fullback, but Schembechler moved him to defensive end in late September 1971. Coleman played at defensive end from 1972 to 1973 and helped the Wolverines tie for first place in the Big Ten Conference both years. Although still listed as a defensive end, Schembechler described Coleman's role as follows in 1973: "In our defense we use a flop-end. So Coleman is actually a pro linebacker. He has to cover the pass as part of his responsibility today more so than normal." Coleman had 51 tackles and 52 assists for the Wolverines.

== Professional career ==
Coleman was drafted by the New Orleans Saints in the 16th round (398th overall pick) of the 1974 NFL draft. He played two seasons for the Saints in 1974 and 1975, appearing in 27 NFL games. Coleman was cut by the Saints in August 1976. He signed as a free agent with the New York Jets shortly after being released by the Saints, but he missed the entire 1976 NFL season with a left knee injury. In August 1977, Coleman underwent surgery on his right knee, and he was placed on injured reserve status. The Jets released Coleman in June 1978.

== Advertising career ==
While recovering from football injuries, Coleman obtained an M.B.A. degree in marketing from Hofstra University in New York in 1976. In 1978, he was hired as an assistant account executive at the Campbell-Ewald advertising agency in Detroit. He later recalled: "I was the only black person in account management in the office. It was boring work, but I was speedy and accurate, persevered and became a full account executive." In 1983, he became senior vice president and management supervisor on the Chevrolet account.

Coleman next began a career in advertising directed to minority communities. He was hired in 1983 as a senior vice president and account director for Burrell Advertising, a Chicago firm specializing in advertising to minorities.

In 1988, he formed Don Coleman Associates, which became Don Coleman Advertising in 1991. He sold a minority interest in the company and bought two additional agencies, one focused on the Asian-American market (Innovasia Communications) and one focused on the Hispanic market (Montemayor y Asociados). He combined the companies into GlobalHue, specializing in a culture based approach to marketing. He is the chairman and chief executive of GlobalHue.

In 2009, GlobalHue's capitalized billings were $833.7 million. The company has approximately 300 employees in Southfield, Michigan and New York City. Its clients include Subway, the United States Navy, U.S. Census 2010, Verizon Wireless, Merck & Co., Inc., Walmart and Chrysler Group. In 2009, GlobalHue was named "Multicultural Advertising Agency of the Decade" by Advertising Week magazine. In 2010, Black Enterprise magazine named GlobalHue the BE 100 Advertising Agency of the Year, an honor that GlobalHue also received in 1998 and 2003. Coleman's daughter, Kelli Coleman, has also worked for GlobalHue since 2002 and is the vice president for business development.

In 2009, Coleman launched The Coleman Entrepreneurial Scholarship (CES), which strives to promote entrepreneurship as a career choice among college students of ethnic backgrounds, particularly African-American and Hispanic. CES awards $50,000 in scholarships annually.

Coleman is also a member of the External Advisory Board at the A.C. Nielsen Center Marketing Research Business School, the Board of Visitors at The Howard University John H. Johnson School of Communications, and the Board of Trustees for the Charles H. Wright Museum of African American History and the Louis Carr Internship Foundation. Since 1999, he has served as vice chairman of the National Action Network (NAN), where he is a contributor to the organization's fundraising initiatives.
