= GlobalHue =

American advertising agency

- Industry: Advertising agency
- Founded: 1988; 38 years ago in Southfield, Michigan, United States
- Founder: Don Coleman
- Defunct: 2016
- Headquarters: Southfield, Michigan

GlobalHue was a privately owned advertising agency specializing in what the firm called a culture based approach to marketing, with offices in New York City and Southfield, Michigan (Detroit). The agency provided companies with an integrated approach to marketing to ethnic-specific audiences.

The agency offered full-service marketing, advertising, media planning and buying, digital, events and promotions, and public relations for blue-chip clients including Verizon Wireless, Walmart, Chrysler Group LLC, U.S. Navy, Jeep, and OneMain Financial. In 2016, amidst the lawsuits against the company, both the Detroit and New York offices were closed.

== History ==
GlobalHue was founded in 1988 by Don Coleman as Don Coleman Associates in Southfield, Michigan.

In 1997, the firm transitioned to become Don Coleman Advertising, a firm specializing in marketing to African Americans.

In 1999, True North Communications acquired a 49% stake in Don Coleman Advertising. Interpublic Group's purchase of True North in 2001 brought along the minority interest in Don Coleman Advertising.

In 2002, the firm acquired Hispanic agency Montemayor y Asociados and Asian-American agency Innovasia Communications to become GlobalHue, covering the three main U.S. ethnic segments.

In 2003, GlobalHue CEO Coleman initiated a buyback from IPG to become the independent multicultural agency GlobalHue.

In 2009, GlobalHue's capitalized billings were $833.7 million.

In 2009, GlobalHue was named “Multicultural Advertising Agency of the Decade” by Advertising Week.

In 2010, Black Enterprise magazine named GlobalHue the BE 100 Advertising Agency of the Year, which was also awarded in 1998 and 2003.

== Total Market ==
In 2009, as multicultural marketing was becoming increasingly mainstream, GlobalHue enlarged its focus to a category it calls “total market,” encompassing population segments of mixed ethnicities that are united on the basis of affinities, values and culture. Its ad campaigns for Chrysler Jeep, MGM Grand Detroit and the Bermuda Department of Tourism took this “total market” approach.

== Research ==
In 2009, GlobalHue conducted a large survey of U.S. consumers and created a report on the findings. “Multicultural Nation: Convergence and Divergence in the New America” presented insights for marketing to a complex ethnic and cultural consumer population. The report confirmed that prevalent assumptions about segments, both Non-Hispanic Whites and ethnic, are becoming irrelevant and even risky for brand success in the diversified consumer market.

== Campaigns ==
=== MGM Grand Detroit casino ===
In the 2009 “Touch the Lion” campaign for MGM Grand Detroit casino, GlobalHue created billboards depicting golden female eyes flashing devilishly against a dark background and the casino lion logo. The “demon” eyes drew protest from the Detroit religious community, which in turn attracted media attention. The casino posted the biggest single-day “coin-in” in its history - $25.9 million – after the campaign. The golden eyes theme was also used in print advertising. In 2010, the casino was the most profitable within the 12-casino MGM group and the largest Detroit area casino in gross revenue with 41.2 percent of the total gaming revenue.

=== Bermuda Department of Tourism ===
For the Bermuda Department of Tourism's “Feel the Love” campaign for the total market, GlobalHue rebranded the island vacation destination as a weekend and short vacation option for a youthful, upscale “urbane traveler” from major East coast cities, rather than day trippers on cruises. Before the campaign, visitors per year between 1990 and 2005 averaged 531,988. For three years during the campaign, the number of visitors averaged 620,215, representing a 16.6% increase over the previous 15 years. Mar 16, 2009: Don Coleman's GlobalHue is accused of ripping off the government of Bermuda by overbilling its $13 million tourism advertising contract. In a report by Bermuda auditor general Larry Dennis, GlobalHue is accused of: Overbilling the account by $1.8 million. http://www.cbsnews.com/news/globalhue-accused-of-overbilling-bermuda-account-agency-plays-race-card/

=== Chrysler 300C sedan ===
The 2008 Chrysler 300C sedan campaign titled “The Artist Inside You” was targeted at African American business people and entrepreneurs encompassing TV, print, radio and digital, featuring 300C cars as customized works of art. The campaign aired in January and February, the worst period in the automotive sales year. It was also challenged by poor public perceptions of American car quality and high regard for imports. In spite of that, the 300C had 1,100 dealer orders in nine days and sold out in record time.

The strategy placed the vehicle at the center of custom car culture and its intersection with urban influencers. Through partnership with DUB magazine, a hip hop car culture brand, GlobalHue aligned the 300C with urban recording artists including Snoop Dogg and Sean Paul and sports stars such as Steve Smith and Corey Maggette, placing the vehicle in music videos, magazines, custom wheel ads, MTV Cribs, custom car shows and everywhere urban culture and custom cars came together. A key moment of the campaign occurred when the rapper 50 Cent called the Chairman of Chrysler to place an order and the recording of the call was leaked. This increased the 300C's status as an urban icon, superseding overall Chrysler brand awareness.

Late in the model lifecycle, GlobalHue produced a more public and traditional campaign that acknowledged the car's urban icon status.

=== Verizon Wireless ===
GlobalHue helped Verizon connect with African-Americans through a grassroots Gospel competition for print and television titled “How Sweet the Sound”. The campaign drew on the community's affinity for church participation.

=== Walmart ===
Walmart's ad campaign supporting Black History Month in 2009 for TV, radio and digital with “Grandma’s Hands” drove positive awareness of the brand among African Americans; as a result, corporate sponsorship of year-long Black History initiatives is a permanent part of the brand's marketing.

=== Chrysler Jeep(R) ===
In 2009 GlobalHue was awarded the global Jeep(R) brand account by Chrysler Group. GlobalHue created a three-part phased campaign titled “I live. I ride. I am. Jeep.” which positioned Jeep as "a new way of working, playing and living always on your own terms." The campaign included outdoor and transit, broadcast, print, digital and retail ads, and sought to expand the brand's appeal to a younger, more diverse and urban customer base. In the year of the campaign, Jeep posted double-digit sales growth and became the Chrysler Group's top selling brand.

=== Jeep Compass ===
GlobalHue's 2011 Jeep Compass campaign, titled "Bloodline", launched in February. "Bloodline" showcased the Jeep Compass in urban and off-road settings, and features the bloodlines of father-daughter athletes Muhammad and Laila Ali and father-son actors James and Scott Caan. Critics had not considered previous incarnations of the Compass as fully part of Jeep's "military and off-road heritage"; the new model received an updated available four-wheel drive powertrain and Jeep's "Trail Rated badge". The campaign declared the Compass's Jeep lineage.

=== US Census 2010 ===
For the 2010 US Census, GlobalHue was awarded the information campaign for Americans of Hispanic, Portuguese, African, African-Caribbean and African American ethnicity. Census’ goal of 90 percent compliance was challenged by skepticism and distrust within these populations. With a message of strong community empowerment, use of non-traditional formats (such as lunch trucks, local restaurant menus, Webisodes mimicking popular telenovela), and a focus on clarifying the government commitment to confidentiality, GlobalHue's strategy for the campaign “It’s In Your Hands” helped this Census become one of the most successful ever conducted.

The Hispanic campaign included a mural painted in Spanish Harlem, used as the basis of print and TV ads, referring to the historic means of communication in Hispanic societies. One TV spot for the Hispanic market, “Communidad,” tested well, and was used in the general audience market. Midway through the campaign, 95 percent of Hispanics stated that their families intended to be counted.

== Honors ==
2010 AdWeekMedia Multicultural Agency of the Decade

Black Enterprise 100 Company of the Year Award

== Legal Troubles ==
Don Coleman's GlobalHue is accused of ripping off the government of Bermuda by overbilling its $13 million tourism advertising contract. In a report by Bermuda auditor general Larry Dennis (pictured), GlobalHue is accused of: - Overbilling the account by $1.8 million. - Prebilling the government in violation of its own rules. - Not keeping invoices and billing records. - Not returning discounts and credits to the client. - Using a media buyer, Cornerstone, that charged commissions of up to 181 percent (Cornerstone's average commission charged was 51 percent, the report says, and the average media industry commissions tend to be about 15 percent.)

Top executives of Coleman's GlobalHue firm filed a class action lawsuit in Manhattan federal court claiming they have not been paid in months. The lawsuit claims the company's employees, including its executive creative director and the former head of the Wal-Mart account, saw their last paychecks on March 15.

Coleman “repeatedly assured employees that they would be paid for the work that they performed,” the lawsuit said. But the money never came through — even as Coleman continues to assign them work, they said.

One former employee told The Post that the first sign of trouble came in December when the company failed to make good on one of two monthly paychecks. At the time, the company blamed the problem on the bank. Eventually, Coleman held a staff meeting in New York where he confessed to “financial challenges,” this person said. The 6’ 2” linebacker explained that he was in the process of working with investors who would provide enough funding to make sure it never happened again, this person said. “We were strung along for months and months,” this person said.

The ad agency lost several big accounts this year including UB Bancorp, Autozone and AARP. FIAT Chrysler stopped working with GobalHue last year after five years. Separately, Coleman is being pursued in Manhattan federal court for $1.24 million by a real estate company that says GlobalHue broke its lease for two floors of office space at 123 Williams Street downtown.

Coleman is also being sued in Manhattan federal court by Leonard Howard, who says he was ordered to drive Coleman's daughter Kelli Coleman around town from morning to night without overtime.

Howard said he was ordered to wait for Kelli Coleman while she “spent long evenings in various clubs in New York City,” and then to pick her up the next day at 8 am to take her to the gym. He, too, stopped getting paid in March, he said.
