= Jim Maddock =

American football player (1934–2011)

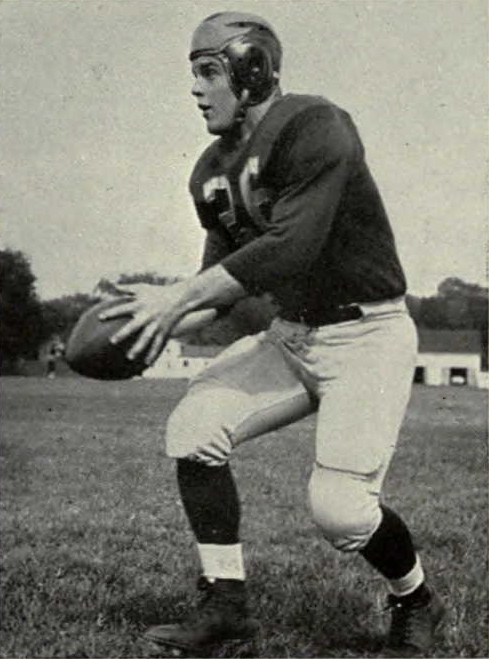
- Maddock in 1956

No. 26 – Michigan Wolverines
- Position: Quarterback

Personal information
- Born: December 23, 1934; Chicago, Illinois
- Died: July 20, 2011 (aged 76); Chicago, Illinois
- Listed height: 5 ft 11 in (1.80 m)
- Listed weight: 189 lb (86 kg)

Career information
- High school: Fenwick High School, Oak Park, Illinois
- College: Michigan

Career history
- 1954–1956: Michigan

James Andrew 'Mad Dog' Maddock (December 23, 1934 – July 20, 2011) was an American football player. He played at the quarterback position for the University of Michigan from 1954 to 1956. He appeared in all 127 games for the Wolverines during his sophomore, junior and senior years, and led the teams to final Associated Press rankings of No. 15 in 1954, No. 12 in 1955, and No. 19 in 1956.

== Early life ==
A native of Chicago, Illinois, Maddock attended Fenwick High School, a Roman Catholic high school located in Oak Park, Illinois. Maddock played both football and basketball for the Fenwick Friars from 1951 to 1953.

== University of Michigan ==
After graduating from Fenwick High School, Maddock enrolled at the University of Michigan in 1953. He played at the quarterback position in all 127 games played by Michigan during the 1954, 1955 and 1956 football seasons.

=== 1954 season ===
As a sophomore, Maddock appeared in all nine games (one as a starter) for the 1954 Michigan Wolverines football team. On October 9, 1954, Maddock led Michigan to 14–13 victory over Iowa, after falling behind 13–0 in the first quarter. The game-winning touchdown came in the second quarter on a 28-yard touchdown pass from Maddock to College Football Hall of Fame end Ron Kramer. Maddock also scored the game-winning touchdown in a 14–7 win over Illinois on a pass from Lou Baldacci in the second quarter. The 1954 team finished with a 6–3 record, ranked No. 15 in the final AP poll.

=== 1955 season ===
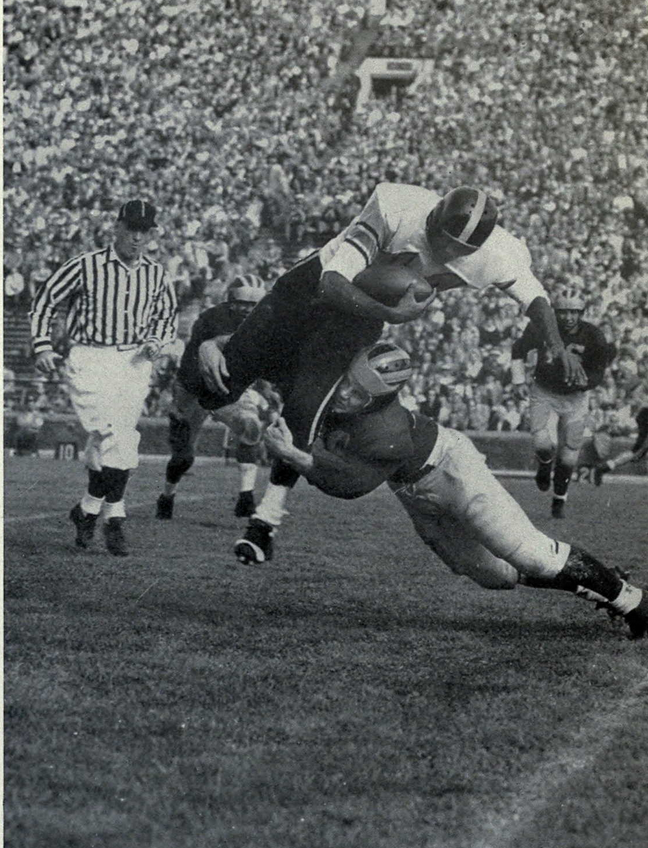
Maddock tackles Iowa halfback Earl Smith, 1954

Going into 1955 season, Michigan's passing offense was expected to excel. With Maddock at quarterback and "touchdown twins" Ron Kramer and Tom Maentz at the end positions, the Associated Press wrote in a pre-season story, "Michigan's famed 'pass, punt and a prayer' formula will be changed this year to 'A pass, a run and a pass' in all probability. The prayer won't be needed." Playing in all nine games (seven as the starter), Maddock missed two starts after suffering a hip injury against Northwestern. He led the 1955 Michigan Wolverines football team to a 6–0 record and a No. 1 ranking after the first six weeks. However, Michigan lost two of its last three games to finish with a 7–2 record and a No. 12 ranking in the final AP poll.

On October 29, 1955, Maddock gained notoriety after leading the Wolverines to a come-from-behind win in a nationally-televised game against Iowa. After falling behind 21–13, Maddock "fired towering touchdown passes to ends Ron Kramer and Tom Maentz in the final nine minutes." He completed five of six passes for 162 yards and two touchdowns, including a 65-yard touchdown pass to Kramer.

=== 1956 season ===
As a senior, Maddock was the backup to Jim Van Pelt, but appeared in all nine games for the 1956 team. In his final game for Michigan, Maddock helped lead the Wolverines to a 19–0 win over Ohio State. He completed 5 of 10 passes for 66 yards, caught a 23-yard pass from Bob Ptacek, and scored Michigan's final touchdown on a plunge from inside the one-yard line in the fourth quarter.

After the 1956 season, Maddock played in the North–South Shrine Game in the Orange Bowl in Miami, Florida. Maddock was teamed in the backfield with Oklahoma's Tommy McDonald, winner of the 1956 Maxwell Award. The pair led the North team to a 17–7 win, and Maddock accounted for the game's final points as he kicked a field goal in the final minute of play.

=== Career statistics ===
In three years at Michigan, Maddock completed 55 of 129 passes for 849 yards, three touchdowns and 11 interceptions. He also had three rushing touchdowns and two receiving touchdowns.

== Later life ==
After leaving Michigan, Maddock opened a construction supply business, Maddock Industries, which he ran in Chicago for more than 40 years. He died on July 20, 2011, at the age of 76.
