= Tom Johnson (tackle, born 1931) =

American football player (1931–1991)

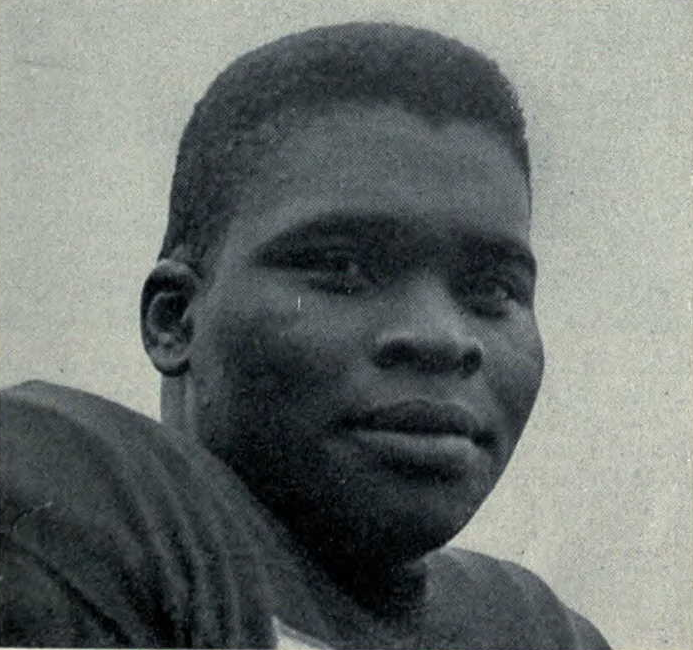

No. 72
- Positions: Defensive tackle, offensive tackle

Personal information
- Born: January 19, 1931; Chicago, Illinois, U.S.
- Died: May 15, 1991 (aged 60); Muskegon Heights, Michigan, U.S.
- Listed height: 6 ft 2 in (1.88 m)
- Listed weight: 230 lb (104 kg)

Career information
- High school: Muskegon Heights
- College: Michigan (1948–1951)
- NFL draft: 1952: 6th round, 63rd overall pick

Career history
- Green Bay Packers (1952)

Awards and highlights
- First-team All-Big Ten (1951)
- Stats at Pro Football Reference

Thomas Johnson (January 19, 1931 – May 15, 1991) was an American football player. He played at the defensive and offensive tackle positions for the University of Michigan from 1948 to 1951. He was selected as the most valuable defensive tackle in the Big Ten Conference in 1950 and as a first-team All-American at the same position in 1951. He was selected in the 6th round of the 1952 NFL draft and became the second African-American to play for the Green Bay Packers in the National Football League (NFL).

== Early life ==
Johnson was born in Chicago in 1931 and raised in Muskegon Heights, Michigan. He attended Muskegon Heights High School where he played football under legendary high school football coach Oscar "Okie" Johnson. He also played center for the Muskegon Heights basketball team.

== University of Michigan ==
In 1948, Johnson enrolled at the University of Michigan where he helped work his way through college by washing dishes. He competed in both football and track and field. Johnson was 6 feet, 2 inches tall, and weighed 220 pounds as a football player for the Wolverines. Johnson was a starter at the tackle position for Bennie Oosterbaan's 1949, 1950 and 1951 Michigan Wolverines football teams. As a sophomore in 1949, Johnson started three games at left tackle, sharing the position with College Football Hall of Fame inductee Alvin Wistert.

=== 1950 season ===
As a junior in 1950, Johnson started all 10 games for Michigan at defensive left tackle and also started 6 games at offensive left tackle. The 1950 team started the season with a record of 2–3–1, but turned the season around with a 20–7 win over Indiana. After the Indiana game, the Associated Press praised Johnson, noting that his "work has maintained the same high level whether Michigan rolled or faltered," and further noted that "the burly Muskegon Heights tackle" was "the key man" in Michigan's improvement. The AP story continued:

"The big 220-pound junior has been a standout against Army, Wisconsin, Minnesota, Illinois and Indiana. Such backs as the Army's Jack Martin and Minnesota's Larry Easer, among others, know the surprise of breaking into the clear only to be dragged down from behind by the cat-quick tackle."

The 1950 team finished the regular season with three straight wins to win the Big Ten Conference championship. The Wolverines went on to defeat California 14–6 in the 1951 Rose Bowl.

In December 1950, Bernie Swanson, sports editor of the Minneapolis Star, picked Johnson as the best defensive tackle in the Big Ten Conference.

=== 1951 season ===
As a senior in 1951, Johnson started all 9 games for Michigan at both defensive left tackle and offensive left tackle. At the conclusion of his playing career at Michigan, the Chicago Daily Tribune wrote that Johnson ranked with the greatest ever to play at the tackle position for the Wolverines:

"When Tom, known to his teammates as Big Gun, played his final game last fall he had won a place alongside such great Michigan tackles as Otto Pommerening, the three Wisterts, Merv Pregulman, and Al Wahl. He was a 60 minute operator in these days of offensive and defensive platoons. Tom's intuitive ability, his quickness, and his savvy made his work seem so easy that his value was appreciated only by experts. He has the gift of doing the right thing so naturally that he handles blockers and ball carriers in a completely unspectacular way."

In December 1951, Johnson was selected as a first-team defensive tackle on the All-Players All-American team, an All-America team sponsored by the Chicago Tribune and determined based on polling of players in cooperation with the major universities and colleges throughout the United States. The 1951 results were based on a record 18,876 votes. Johnson was also selected as a first-team All-Big Ten tackle by both the Associated Press and United Press.

At the end of his senior year, Johnson was also selected to play for the College All-Star team in the annual match against the NFL championship team. While training with the College All-Stars, Chicago Tribune columnist Arch Ward wrote that it would be hard for Michigan coach Bennie Oosterbaan to replace Johnson. Ward added, "Tom Johnson, the 60 minute All-American currently assigned to a first string tackle berth in the College All-Star camp, is the acme of modesty.... Hardly a man around can remember him saying anything since the Collegians gathered at St. John's Military academy."

=== Track and field ===
In addition to football, Johnson earned two varsity letters at Michigan in track and field. He finished second in the shot put at the 1952 Big Ten Conference indoor track meet. He graduated from Michigan in 1952, receiving a degree in physical education.

== Professional football ==
Johnson was picked by the Green Bay Packers in the sixth round (63rd overall pick) of the 1952 NFL draft. When Johnson and Iowa's Donal Riley signed with the Packers, the announcement in the Wisconsin newspapers focused on their race. The Oshkosh Daily Northwestern ran the story under the headline, "Packers to Try Out Negro Players." The Capital Times led the story as follows: "The signing of two Negro athletes —- Tackle Tom Johnson of Michigan and Fullback Donal (Mike) Riley of Iowa —- was announced today by the Green Bay Packers." Johnson appeared in eight games for the Packers during the 1952 NFL season. He was the second African-American to play for the Packers, following the lead of fellow Michigan Wolverine, Bob Mann, who joined the Packers in 1950.

== Death ==
Johnson died in Muskegon Heights, Michigan on May 15, 1991, at the age of 60.

== See also ==
- 1951 College Football All-America Team
