= Joe Soboleski =

American football player (1926–2015)

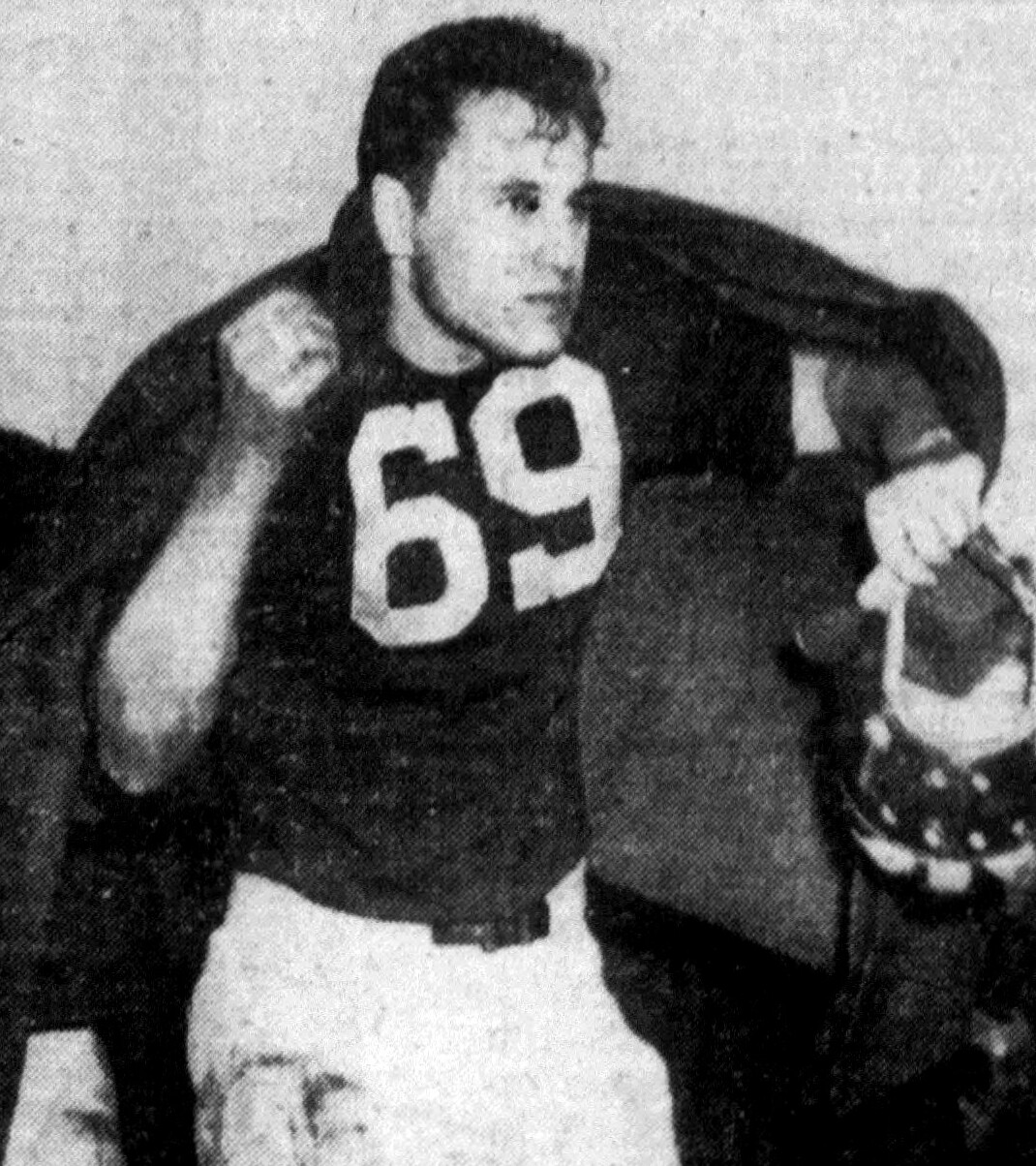
- Soboleski during the 1948 Rose Bowl

No. 35, 60, 24, 64
- Positions: Guard, tackle, defensive tackle

Personal information
- Born: August 22, 1926; Grand Rapids, Michigan, U.S.
- Died: November 12, 2015 (aged 89)
- Listed height: 6 ft 0 in (1.83 m)
- Listed weight: 213 lb (97 kg)

Career information
- High school: Catholic Central (Grand Rapids)
- College: Michigan (1945–1948)
- NFL draft: 1949: 9th round, 86th overall pick

Career history
- Chicago Hornets (1949); Washington Redskins (1949); Detroit Lions (1950); New York Yanks (1951); Dallas Texans (1952)

Awards and highlights
- National champion (1948)

Career NFL/AAFC statistics
- Games played: 27
- Games started: 4
- Fumble recoveries: 2
- Stats at Pro Football Reference

Joseph Robert Soboleski Jr. (August 22, 1926 – November 12, 2015) was an American football guard.

Soboleski began his football career playing for Catholic Central High School in Grand Rapids, Michigan. After graduating from high school, Soboleski spent 18 months in the United States Navy, including eight months in the Pacific Theater during World War II. He played college football at the University of Michigan as a defensive lineman from 1945 to 1948. He was a starting defensive lineman on Michigan's undefeated 1947 and 1948 national championship teams. At the conclusion of his college career, Soboleski was selected to play in the 1949 College All-Star Game in Chicago.

Soboleski was selected in the ninth round of the 1949 NFL draft by the New York Giants, but he signed instead with the Chicago Hornets of the All-America Football Conference (AAFC). Soboleski played four years of professional football for five teams: Chicago Hornets (1949), Washington Redskins (1949), Detroit Lions (1950), the New York Yanks (1951), and the Dallas Texans (1952). He was released by the Texans after 24–6 loss in the 1952 season opener.
