= Jerry Marciniak =

American gridiron football player (1937–2014)

Profile
- Position: G

Personal information
- Born: March 30, 1937
- Died: January 2, 2014 (aged 76)
- Listed height: 6 ft 2 in (1.88 m)
- Listed weight: 230 lb (104 kg)

Career information
- College: University of Michigan

Career history
- 1959: Saskatchewan Roughriders

Gerald P. Marciniak (March 30, 1937 – January 14, 2014) was a Canadian Football League (CFL) player and Michigan Wolverine football player.

Marciniak was raised in Chicago and played football for Mount Carmel High School. He was the co-captain of Mount Carmel's 1954 football team that won the Chicago Catholic League championship and then lost in the city championship game.

After graduating from high school, Marciniak attended the University of Michigan starting in 1955. He played college football at the tackle for the 1957 and 1958 Michigan Wolverines football teams.

He later played for the Saskatchewan Roughriders during the 1959 season.

After retiring from football, Marciniak worked as a sales representative for Bliss & Laughlin in Harvey, Illinois. He was also a member of Chicago Mayor Richard J. Daley's commission on human relations in the 1960s.

In 1991, Marciniak was named to the all-time football team from Mt. Carmel High School.

Marciniak died on January 2, 2014, from complications of Parkinson's disease.
