= Gene Knutson =

American football player (1932–2008)

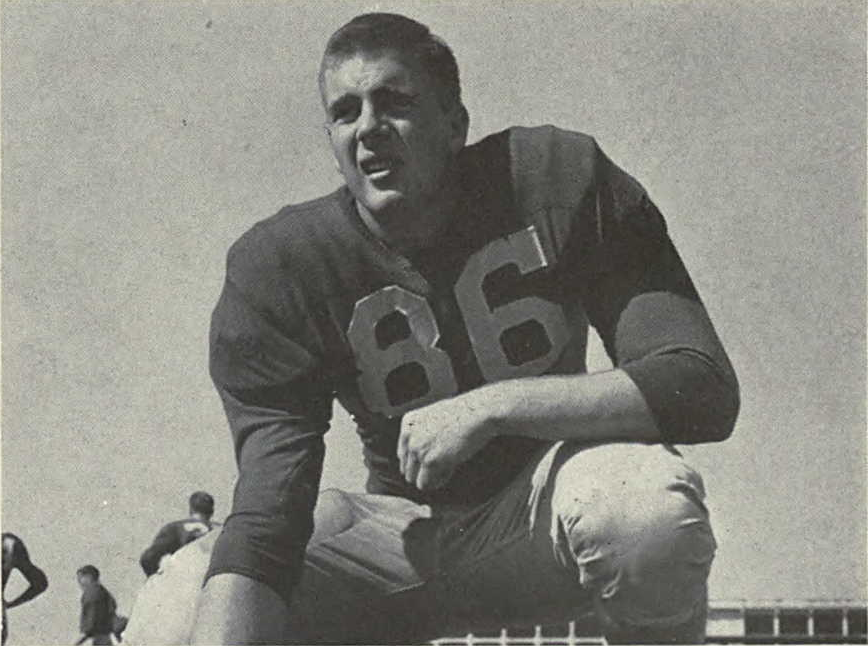
- Gene Knutson at Michigan, 1952

No. 81
- Position: Defensive end

Personal information
- Born: November 10, 1932; Beloit, Wisconsin, U.S.
- Died: February 9, 2008 (aged 75); Cassopolis, Michigan, U.S.
- Listed height: 6 ft 2 in (1.88 m)
- Listed weight: 218 lb (99 kg)

Career information
- High school: Beloit
- College: Michigan (1950–1953)
- NFL draft: 1954: 10th round, 111th overall pick

Career history
- Green Bay Packers (1954–1956)

Awards and highlights
- 1953 Hula Bowl College All-Star Game

Career NFL statistics
- Fumble recoveries: 1
- Stats at Pro Football Reference

Eugene Peter "Gene" Knutson (November 10, 1932 – February 9, 2008) was an American professional football player. He played college football as an offensive and defensive end for the University of Michigan (1951–1953) and professional football as a defensive end for the Green Bay Packers (1954–1956). As a senior at Michigan, Knutson was selected to play in the Hula Bowl College All-Star Game.

== Early years in Beloit ==
Knutson was born in Beloit, Wisconsin in 1932. He was the son of Florence and Peter Knutson. He began playing football at Lincoln High School in Beloit. At Beloit Memorial High School, he played football, basketball and track and field. He earned seven varsity letters and won all-state honors in both football and basketball and was a hurdler on Beloit's state championship track team as a junior. Knutson graduated from Beloit High School in 1950. One of his teammates later recalled, "Gene was probably one of the best all-around athletes Beloit High School ever had."

== University of Michigan ==
Knutson enrolled at the University of Michigan in 1950. After his freshman season, Michigan head coach Bennie Oosterbaan said that Knutson was "unquestionably Michigan's outstanding freshman prospect." He sustained a broken leg in April 1951 while stepping off a curb, but he recovered in time for the 1951 football season. Knutson played for the Michigan Wolverines football team from 1951 to 1953. He played at the offensive and defensive end position for Michigan. By his senior year, he was 6 feet, 5 inches tall and weighed 230 pounds. In October 1953, he caught a 29-yard touchdown pass on fourth down in the fourth quarter to help Michigan to a 14-13 victory over Iowa. He was selected as an All-Midwest player and played in the college all-star Hula Bowl.

Knutson later recalled the first time he ran out of the tunnel into Michigan Stadium in front of 100,000 fans: "That was such a thrill to me, so exciting. How could I ever explain that to someone? Unless you experience sitting in that locker room, getting dressed, warming up and then going out to that crowd and playing in that ballgame, you'll never know. It was exhilarating."

== Green Bay Packers ==
Knutson was drafted by the Green Bay Packers in the 10th round (111th overall pick) of the 1954 NFL draft. He played as a defensive end for the Packers, appearing in 18 games during the 1954 and 1956 NFL seasons. Knutson did not play for the Packers in 1955 after suffering an injury in an exhibition game against the Washington Redskins. His highest annual salary as a professional athlete was $8,000. Knutson later recalled his days in the NFL as follows: "It was more of a business - dog eat dog. When I played there were only 12 teams and the (roster) limit was 33. It was a lot harder to get on a pro roster than it is now. I would love to be coming out of college now."

== Later life ==
After the 1956 season, Knutson retired from football due to chronic knee problems. He taught and coached at St. Joseph's High School in South Bend, Indiana, before entering the insurance business. He also worked as an executive vice president for Ara Parseghian Enterprises. In his later years, he lived in Cassopolis, Michigan.

== Family and death ==
In 1953, Knutson married the former Carol Buschbaum of South Bend, Indiana. His first wife died in 1982, and in 1995, Knutson married Vicki Futterknecht of Cassopolis. Knutson died of cancer in February 2008 at Cassopolis.
