= Bob Ptacek =

American gridiron football player (born 1937)

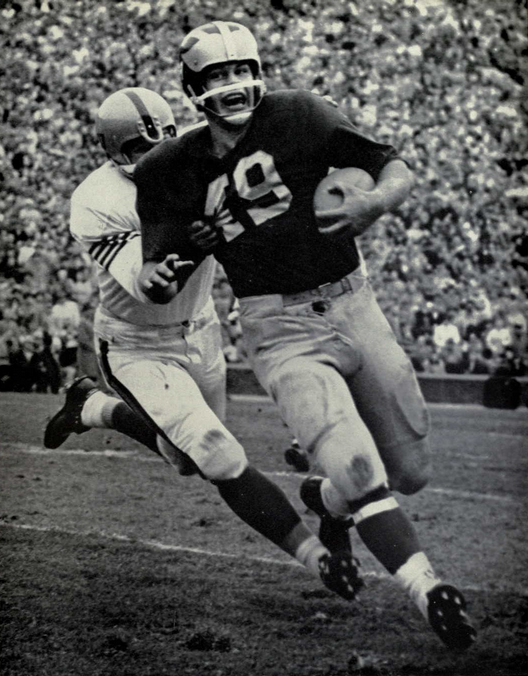

No. 18, 14
- Positions: Quarterback, defensive back, linebacker

Personal information
- Born: April 23, 1937 (age 89); Cleveland, Ohio, U.S.
- Died: 06/29/2026
- Listed height: 6 ft 1 in (1.85 m)
- Listed weight: 205 lb (93 kg)

Career information
- High school: Holy Name (Parma Heights, Ohio)
- College: Michigan
- NFL draft: 1959: 8th round, 87th overall pick

Career history
- Cleveland Browns (1959); Saskatchewan Roughriders (1960–1965)

Awards and highlights
- CFL All-Star (1964); 2× CFL Western All-Star (1961, 1961); Second-team All-Big Ten (1958)

Career NFL statistics
- Rushing yards: 13
- Rushing average: 4.3
- Stats at Pro Football Reference

Robert J. Ptacek, Jr. (born April 23, 1937) is a former professional American and Canadian football player. He played college football at the halfback and quarterback positions for the University of Michigan from 1956 to 1958. He later played professional football in the National Football League (NFL) for the Cleveland Browns in 1959 and in the Canadian Football League (CFL) for the Saskatchewan Roughriders from 1960 to 1965. He was a CFL All-Star in 1964 as a defensive back and an All-Western Conference linebacker in 1961.

== Early life ==
Ptacek was born in Cleveland, Ohio, in 1937. He attended Holy Name High School in Cleveland.

== University of Michigan ==
Ptacek enrolled at the University of Michigan in 1955 and played for head coach Bennie Oosterbaan's Michigan Wolverines football teams from 1956 to 1958.

As a sophomore, Ptacek started two games at the left halfback position for the 1956 Michigan Wolverines football team. He completed 15 of 23 passes for 245 yards, two interceptions and three touchdowns. He also rushed for 208 yards on 45 carries and caught seven passes for 53 yards.

As a junior in 1957, Ptacek did not start any games, completed two of three passes, gained 186 rushing yards on 60 carries, and caught eight passes for 88 yards.

As a senior, Ptacek started all nine games at quarterback for the 1958 Michigan Wolverines football team that compiled a 2-6-1 record. He played on both offense and defense in 1958, remaining on the field for 51 of 60 minutes in a 20–19 victory over Minnesota; an Associated Press story referred to him as one of football's "vanishing breed -- the iron man." He was selected as the Most Valuable Player on the 1958 team, completing 65 of 115 passes for 760 yards, nine interceptions and three touchdowns. In the 1958 Michigan-Ohio State game, Ptacek set a Big Ten Conference record of 24 pass completions in a single game; Ptacek's 24 completions were good for 241 yards and two touchdowns.

After the conclusion of the 1958 season, Ptacek was selected to play at the quarterback position for the college all-star teams in both the Hula Bowl and the College All-Star Game. He completed 12 of 26 passes for 136 yards and two touchdowns and rushed for 152 yards, including a 43-yard touchdown run, against the NFL all-stars in the January 1959 Hula Bowl. He was named the Most Valuable Player in the August 1959 College All-Star game after completing five of eight passes against the NFL champion Baltimore Colts.

== Professional football ==
Ptacek was selected by the Cleveland Browns in the eighth round (87th overall pick) of the 1959 NFL draft. He appeared in 12 games for the 1959 Cleveland Browns and totaled 13 rushing yards on three carries.

In an unusual NFL-CFL transaction, the Browns in May 1960 dealt Ptacek to the Saskatchewan Roughriders of the Canadian Football League (CFL) in exchange for Jim Marshall. Ptacek played for Saskatchewan from 1960 to 1965. He had his career-best season in 1962, completing 125 of 206 passes for 2,317 yards, 15 touchdowns and 10 interceptions. During his six-year CFL career, Ptacek scored four rushing touchdowns on offense and two on interception returns. He completed 299 of 525 passes for 25 touchdowns. He was named to the All-Canadian team as a defensive back in 1964 as well as All-WFC in 1961 as a linebacker and 1964 defensive back. He was inducted into the Saskatchewan Roughriders Plaza of Honour in 2001.

He holds the CFL record for most fumble returns in a playoff season with three in 1963.
