= 1952 Big Ten Conference football season =

- Sport: American football
- Teams: 9
- Top draft pick: Bernie Flowers
- Co-champions: Wisconsin, Purdue
- Season MVP: Paul Giel

Football seasons
- ← 1951 1953 →

1952 Big Ten Conference football standings
	Conf.					Overall
Team	W		L		T	W		L		T
No. 11 Wisconsin +	4	–	1	–	1	6	–	3	–	1
No. 18 Purdue +	4	–	1	–	1	4	–	3	–	2
No. 17 Ohio State	5	–	2	–	0	6	–	3	–	0
Michigan	4	–	2	–	0	5	–	4	–	0
Minnesota	3	–	1	–	2	4	–	3	–	2
Illinois	2	–	5	–	0	4	–	5	–	0
Northwestern	2	–	5	–	0	2	–	6	–	1
Iowa	2	–	5	–	0	2	–	7	–	0
Indiana	1	–	5	–	0	2	–	7	–	0
+ – Conference co-champions; Rankings from AP Poll

The 1952 Big Ten Conference football season was the 57th season of college football played by the member schools of the Big Ten Conference (also known as the Western Conference and the Big Nine Conference) and was a part of the 1952 college football season.

The 1952 Wisconsin Badgers football team, under head coach Ivy Williamson, compiled a 6–3–1 record, tied for the Big Ten championship, was ranked No. 10 in the final UP poll and No. 11 in the final AP poll, and lost to USC in the 1953 Rose Bowl. Tackle Dave Suminski was the team's only first-team All-American and was selected as the team's most valuable player. Sophomore Alan Ameche was a first-team All-Big Ten player, set a Wisconsin record with 946 rushing yards, and went on to win the 1954 Heisman Trophy.

The 1952 Purdue Boilermakers football team, under head coach Stu Holcomb, was the Big Ten co-champion and ranked No. 12 in the final UP poll and No. 18 in the final AP poll. Purdue end Bernie Flowers was the Big Ten's only consensus first-team All-American in 1952 and was the first Big Ten player selected in the 1953 NFL draft. Dale Samuels was the first Purdue quarterback to pass for over 1,000 yards in a season.

The conference's statistical leaders included Illinois quarterback Tommy O'Connell with 1,761 passing yards and 1,724 yards of total offense, Alan Ameche with 946 rushing yards, and Indiana's Gene Gedman with 54 points scored.

== Season overview ==
=== Results and team statistics ===
Conf. Rank	Team	Head coach	AP final	AP high	Overall record	Conf. record	PPG	PAG	MVP
1 (tie)	Wisconsin	Ivy Williamson	#11	#1	6–3–1	4–1–1	22.8	15.0	Dave Suminski
1 (tie)	Purdue	Stu Holcomb	#18	#8	4–3–2	4–1–1	20.9	16.8	Earl Heninger
3	Ohio State	Woody Hayes	#17	#14	6–3	5–2	21.9	**13.2**	Fred Bruney
4	Michigan	Bennie Oosterbaan	NR	#12	5–4	4–2	**23.0**	14.9	Ted Topor
5	Minnesota	Wes Fesler	NR	NR	4–3–2	3–1–2	14.6	19.0	**Paul Giel**
6	Illinois	Ray Eliot	NR	#2	4–5	2–5	21.6	19.4	Al Brosky
7 (tie)	Northwestern	Bob Voigts	NR	NR	2-6-1	2-5	18.4	28.0	Chuck Hren
7 (tie)	Iowa	Forest Evashevski	NR	NR	2–7	2–5	13.4	24.4	Bill Fenton
9	Indiana	Bernie Crimmins	NR	NR	2–7	1–5	15.9	24.9	Gene Gedman

Key
AP final = Team's rank in the final AP Poll of the 1952 season
AP high = Team's highest rank in the AP Poll throughout the 1952 season
PPG = Average of points scored per game; conference leader's average displayed in bold
PAG = Average of points allowed per game; conference leader's average displayed in bold
MVP = Most valuable player as voted by players on each team as part of the voting process to determine the winner of the Chicago Tribune Silver Football trophy; trophy winner in bold

=== Regular season ===
==== September 27 ====
- Wisconsin 42, Marquette 19.
- Ohio State 33, Indiana 13.
- Purdue 20, Penn State 20.
- Michigan State 27, Michigan 13.

==== October 4 ====
- Wisconsin 20, Illinois 6.
- Purdue 21, Ohio State 14.
- Stanford 14, Michigan 7.

==== October 11 ====
- Ohio State 23, Wisconsin 14.
- Purdue 41, Iowa 14.
- Michigan 28, Indiana 13.

==== October 18 ====
- Wisconsin 42, Iowa 13.
- Ohio State 35, Washington State 7.
- Notre Dame 26, Purdue 14.
- Michigan 48, Northwestern 14.

==== October 25 ====
- UCLA 20, Wisconsin 7.
- Iowa 8, Ohio State 0.
- Purdue 40, Illinois 12.
- Michigan 21, Minnesota 0.

==== November 1 ====
- Wisconsin 21, Rice 7.
- Ohio State 24, Northwestern 21.
- Michigan State 14, Purdue 7.
- Illinois 22, Michigan 13.

==== November 8 ====
- Wisconsin 24, Northwestern 20.
- Pittsburgh 21, Ohio State 14.
- Minnesota 14, Purdue 14.
- Michigan 49, Cornell 7.

==== November 15 ====
- Wisconsin 37, Indiana 14.
- Ohio State 27, Illinois 7.
- Michigan 21, Purdue 10.

==== November 22 ====
- Minnesota 21, Wisconsin 21.
- Ohio State 27, Michigan 7.
- Purdue 21, Indiana 16.

== Awards and honors ==
=== All-Big Ten honors ===
The following players were picked by the Associated Press (AP)as first-team players on the 1952 All-Big Ten Conference football team. The AP picked separate offensive and defensive units, whereas the UP selected a single, eleven man unit.

AP offense and UP overall selections

Position	Name	Team	Selectors
Back	Alan Ameche	Wisconsin	AP, UP
Back	Paul Giel	Minnesota	AP, UP
Back	Tommy O'Connell	Illinois	AP, UP
Back	George Gedman	Indiana	AP
Back	Ted Kress	Michigan	UP
End	Joe Collier	Northwestern	AP, UP
End	Bernard Flowers	Purdue	AP, UP
Tackle	Roger Zatkoff	Michigan	AP [linebacker], UP [tackle]
Tackle	George Jacoby	Ohio State	AP
Tackle	David Suminski	Wisconsin	AP
Tackle	Ray Huizinga	Northwestern	UP
Guard	Bob Kennedy	Wisconsin	AP [defensive guard], UP [guard]
Guard	James Reichenbach	Ohio State	AP
Guard	Robert Timm	Michigan	AP
Guard	George O'Brien	Wisconsin	UP
Center	Walter Cudzik	Purdue	AP
Center	Dick O'Shaughnessy	Michigan	UP

AP defensive unit

Position	Name	Team	Selectors
Defensive end	Bill Fenton	Iowa	AP
Defensive end	Frank Wodziak	Illinois	AP
Defensive tackle	Fred Preziosio	Purdue	AP
Defensive tackle	Art Walker	Michigan	AP
Defensive guard	Bob Kennedy	Wisconsin	AP [defensive guard], UP [guard]
Defensive guard	Percy Zachary	Minnesota	AP
Linebacker	Roger Zatkoff	Michigan	AP [linebacker], UP [tackle]
Linebacker	Tony Curcillo	Ohio State	AP
Defensive back	Fred Bruney	Ohio State	AP
Defensive back	Robert McNamara	Minnesota	AP
Safety	Al Brosky	Illinois	AP

=== All-American honors ===
At the end of the 1952 season, only one Big Ten player secured a consensus first-team pick on the 1952 College Football All-America Team. The Big Ten's consensus All-Americans were:

Position	Name	Team	Selectors
End	Bernie Flowers	Purdue	AAB, FWAA, NEA, TSN, UP, WCFF

Other Big Ten players who were named first-team All-Americans by at least one selector were:

Position	Name	Team	Selectors
End	Joe Collier	Northwestern	INS
Tackle	Dave Suminski	Wisconsin	AP
Guard	Mike Takacs	Ohio State	INS
Back	Paul Giel	Minnesota	AP, FWAA
Back	Lowell Perry	Michigan	NEA

=== Other awards ===
Minnesota running back Paul Giel finished third in the voting for the 1952 Heisman Trophy.

== 1953 NFL draft ==
The following Big Ten players were among the first 100 picks in the 1953 NFL draft:

Name	Position	Team	Round	Overall pick
Bernie Flowers	End	Purdue	2	14
Gene Gedman	Back	Indiana	2	25
Dale Samuels	Quarterback	Purdue	3	28
Fred Bruney	Back	Ohio State	3	35
Roger Zatkoff	Tackle	Michigan	5	55
Rex Smith	End	Illinois	5	61
Tony Curcillo	Back	Ohio State	6	63
Bob Kennedy	Guard	Wisconsin	6	67
Lowell Perry	End	Michigan	8	90
