= 1952 Illinois Fighting Illini football team =

American college football season

1952 Illinois Fighting Illini football
- Conference: Big Ten Conference
- Record: 4–5 (2–5 Big Ten)
- Head coach: Ray Eliot (11th season)
- MVP: Al Brosky
- Captain: Al Brosky
- Home stadium: Memorial Stadium

1952 Big Ten Conference football standings
	Conf.					Overall
Team	W		L		T	W		L		T
No. 11 Wisconsin +	4	–	1	–	1	6	–	3	–	1
No. 18 Purdue +	4	–	1	–	1	4	–	3	–	2
No. 17 Ohio State	5	–	2	–	0	6	–	3	–	0
Michigan	4	–	2	–	0	5	–	4	–	0
Minnesota	3	–	1	–	2	4	–	3	–	2
Illinois	2	–	5	–	0	4	–	5	–	0
Northwestern	2	–	5	–	0	2	–	6	–	1
Iowa	2	–	5	–	0	2	–	7	–	0
Indiana	1	–	5	–	0	2	–	7	–	0
+ – Conference co-champions; Rankings from AP Poll

The 1952 Illinois Fighting Illini football team was an American football team that represented the University of Illinois as a member of the Big Ten Conference during the 1952 Big Ten season. In their 11th year under head coach Ray Eliot, the Fighting Illini compiled a 4–5 record (2–5 in conference games), finished in a three-way tie for sixth place in the Big Ten, and outscored opponents by a total of 194 to 175.

Halfback Al Brosky was selected as the team's most valuable player. Three Illinois players received honors on the 1952 All-Big Ten Conference football team: quarterback Tommy O'Connell (AP-1, UP-1); end Frank Wodziak (AP-1); and safety Al Brosky.

The team played its home games at Memorial Stadium in Champaign, Illinois.

== Schedule ==
Date	Opponent	Rank	Site	Result	Attendance	Source
September 27	Iowa State*	No. 5	Memorial Stadium; Champaign, IL	W 33–7	47,702	
October 4	at No. 8 Wisconsin	No. 2	Camp Randall Stadium; Madison, WI	L 6–20	52,071	
October 11	Washington*	No. 13	Memorial Stadium; Champaign, IL	W 48–14	48,248	
October 18	at Minnesota	No. 17	Memorial Stadium; Minneapolis, MN	L 7–13	54,787	
October 25	Purdue		Memorial Stadium; Champaign, IL (rivalry)	L 12–40	71,119	
November 1	at No. 15 Michigan		Michigan Stadium; Ann Arbor, MI (rivalry)	W 22–13	65,595	
November 8	at Iowa		Iowa Stadium; Iowa City, IA	W 33–13	44,855	
November 15	Ohio State		Memorial Stadium; Champaign, IL (Illibuck)	L 7–27	60,077	
November 22	Northwestern		Memorial Stadium; Champaign, IL (rivalry)	L 26–28	41,214	
*Non-conference game; Rankings from AP Poll released prior to the game

== Games summaries ==
=== Iowa ===
Following the win at Iowa, which was full of penalties and a couple of ejections for fighting, Iowa students began to throw fruit, cans, and bottles at the officials and Illinois' team as they left the field. One Iowa student was also punched by an Illinois player in the melee. Illinois and Iowa were not scheduled to play in 1953 and 1954, but their athletic directors decided to expand that timeline to 1958 in order to allow for a "cooling-off" period. That time frame was eventually extended until 1967, which created a 14-season gap in the series between the conference schools.
