= 1952 Michigan Wolverines football team =

American college football season

1952 Michigan Wolverines football
- Conference: Big Ten Conference
- Record: 5–4 (4–2 Big Ten)
- Head coach: Bennie Oosterbaan (5th season)
- MVP: Ted Topor
- Captain: Merritt Green
- Home stadium: Michigan Stadium

1952 Big Ten Conference football standings
	Conf.					Overall
Team	W		L		T	W		L		T
No. 11 Wisconsin +	4	–	1	–	1	6	–	3	–	1
No. 18 Purdue +	4	–	1	–	1	4	–	3	–	2
No. 17 Ohio State	5	–	2	–	0	6	–	3	–	0
Michigan	4	–	2	–	0	5	–	4	–	0
Minnesota	3	–	1	–	2	4	–	3	–	2
Illinois	2	–	5	–	0	4	–	5	–	0
Northwestern	2	–	5	–	0	2	–	6	–	1
Iowa	2	–	5	–	0	2	–	7	–	0
Indiana	1	–	5	–	0	2	–	7	–	0
+ – Conference co-champions; Rankings from AP Poll

The 1952 Michigan Wolverines football team represented the University of Michigan in the 1952 Big Ten Conference football season. In its fifth year under head coach Bennie Oosterbaan, Michigan compiled a 5–4 record (4–2 against conference opponents), tied for fourth place in the Big Ten, and outscored opponents by a combined total of 207 to 134. For the second consecutive season, Michigan was not ranked in the final AP Poll; it was ranked at No. 17 in the final Litkenhous Ratings.

Defensive end Merritt Green was the team captain, and quarterback Tony Branoff received the team's most valuable player award.

Lowell Perry was selected by the Newspaper Enterprise Association (NEA) as a first-team defensive back on the 1952 College Football All-America Team. Five Michigan players received All-Big Ten honors: linebacker Roger Zatkoff (AP-1, UP-1); guard Bob Timm (AP-1); center Dick O'Shaugnessy (UP-1); left halfback Ted Kress (UP-1); and defensive tackle Art Walker (AP-1).

The team's statistical leaders included Ted Kress with 559 passing yards and 623 rushing yards and Lowell Perry with 492 receiving yards.

== Schedule ==
Date	Opponent	Rank	Site	Result	Attendance	Source
September 27	No. 1 Michigan State*		Michigan Stadium; Ann Arbor, MI (rivalry)	L 13–27	96,490	
October 4	at Stanford*		Stanford Stadium; Stanford, CA	L 7–14	25,000	
October 11	Indiana		Michigan Stadium; Ann Arbor, MI	W 28–13	53,840	
October 18	at Northwestern		Dyche Stadium; Evanston, IL (rivalry)	W 48–14	40,000	
October 25	Minnesota^{†}	No. 19	Michigan Stadium; Ann Arbor, MI (Little Brown Jug)	W 21–0	72,404	
November 1	Illinois	No. 15	Michigan Stadium; Ann Arbor, MI (rivalry)	L 13–22	65,595	
November 8	Cornell*		Michigan Stadium; Ann Arbor, MI	W 49–7	48,614	
November 15	No. 10 Purdue	No. 20	Michigan Stadium; Ann Arbor, MI	W 21–10	58,964	
November 22	at Ohio State	No. 12	Ohio Stadium; Columbus, OH (rivalry)	L 7–27	81,541	
*Non-conference game; ^{†}Homecoming; Rankings from AP Poll released prior to the game

== Game summaries ==
=== Northwestern ===
- Ted Kress 20 Rush, 218 Yds

== Statistical leaders ==
Michigan's individual statistical leaders for the 1952 season include those listed below.

=== Rushing ===
Player	Attempts	Net yards	Yards per attempt	Touchdowns
Ted Kress	135	627	4.6	6
Tony Branoff	86	342	4.0	2
Dick Balzhiser	75	327	4.4	2

=== Passing ===
Player	Attempts	Completions	Interceptions	Comp %	Yards	Yds/Comp	TD	Long
Ted Kress	85	45	7	52.9	559	12.4	4	52
Ted Topor	58	33	4	56.9	440	13.3	2	25
Duncan McDonald	17	7	2	41.2	90	12.9	2	38

=== Receiving ===
Player	Receptions	Yards	Yds/Recp	TD	Long
Lowell Perry	31	492	15.9	5	52
Ted Topor	18	208	11.6	4	32
Thad Stanford	12	200	16.7	0	48

=== Kickoff returns ===
Player	Returns	Yards	Yds/Return	TD	Long
Tony Branoff	6	145	24.2	0	31
Don Oldham	7	123	17.6	0	30
Frank Howell	6	100	16.7	0	26

=== Punt returns ===
Player	Returns	Yards	Yds/Return	TD	Long
Lowell Perry	12	73	6.1	0	15
Don Oldham	5	31	6.2	0	
Dave Tinkham	4	27	6.8	0	6

== Personnel ==
=== Letter winners ===
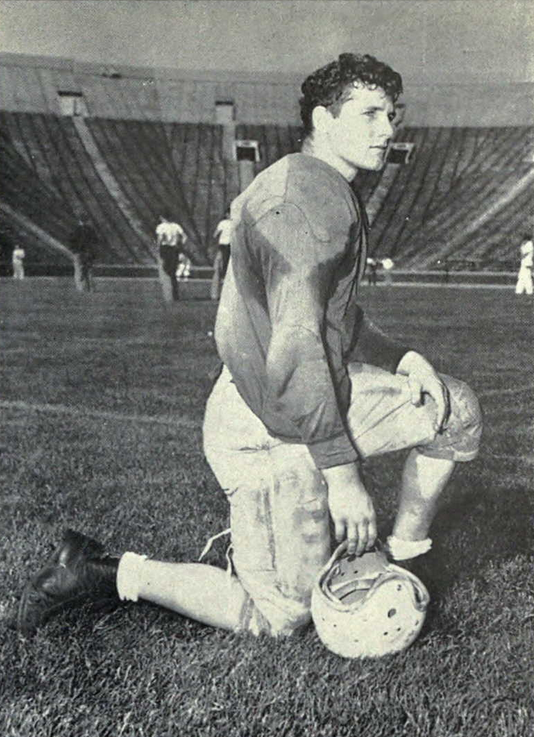
Merritt "Tim" Green, captain of the 1952 team

The following players received varsity letters for their participation on the 1953 team. Players who started at least four games are shown with their names in bold.

- Fred Baer, 5'11", 180 pounds, sophomore, La Grange, IL – started 3 games at fullback
- **James Balog**, 6'3", 210 pounds, junior, Wheaton, IL – started 8 games as defensive right tackle
- **Richard Balzhiser** 6'1", 185 pounds, junior, Wheaton, IL – started 5 games at fullback
- James V. Bates, 6'0", 195 pounds, sophomore, Farmington, MI - end
- **Richard Beison**, 6'0", 200 pounds, junior, East Chicago, IN – started 8 games at offensive right guard
- **Donald Bennett**, 6'2", 195 pounds, junior, Chicago, IL – started 4 games as offensive left tackle
- William E. Billings, 5'11", 180 pounds, senior, Flint, MI - quarterback
- **Tony Branoff**, 5'1", 180 pounds, freshman, Flint, MI – started 6 games as right halfback
- Ted Cachey, 5'11", 185 pounds, junior, Chicago, IL - guard
- J. Daniel Cline, 5'10", 168 pounds, sophomore, Brockport, NY - halfback
- Robert Dingman, 6'0", 180 pounds, senior, Saginaw, MI - end
- Donald Dugger, 5'10", 178 pounds, junior, Charleston, WV - guard
- **George Dutter**, 6'2", 190 pounds, junior, Fort Wayne, IN – started 9 games as defensive right guard
- H. Ronald Geyer, 6'2", 215 pounds, sophomore, Toledo, OH - tackle
- **Merritt Green**, 6'0", 180 pounds, senior, Toledo, OH – started 9 games as defensive left end
- **Frank Howell**, 5'8", 165 pounds, senior, Muskegon Heights, MI – started 3 games as right halfback, 1 game as safety
- Robert Hurley, 5'10", 185 pounds, junior, Alaamosa, CO - fullback
- Stanley Knickerbocker, 5'10", 165 pounds, sophomore, Chelsea, MI - halfback
- **Gene Knutson**, 6'4", 210 pounds, junior, Beloit, WI – started 9 games as defensive right end
- **Ted Kress**, 5'11", 175 pounds, junior, Detroit – started 9 games as left halfback
- **Laurence LeClair**, 6'0", 190 pounds, senior, Anaconda, MT – started 9 games as linebacker
- Robert K. Matheson, 5'10", 190 pounds, senior, Detroit - guard
- Duncan McDonald, 6'0", 175 pounds, sophomore, Flint, MI - quarterback
- Wayne F. Melchiori, 6'0", 185 pounds, senior, Stambaugh, MI - center
- **Don Oldham**, 5'9", 167 pounds, senior, Indianapolis – started 4 games as defensive back, 2 games as safety
- **Dick O'Shaughnessy**, 5'11", 190 pounds, junior, Seaford, NY – started 9 games at center
- **Bernhardt Pederson**, 6'2", 215 pounds, senior, Marquette, MI -started 6 games at offensive right tackle
- **Lowell Perry**, 6'0", 180 pounds, senior, Ypsilanti, MI – started 9 games as offensive left end, 4 games as safety
- Russell Rescorla, 5'11", 180 pounds, senior, Grand Haven, MI – started 3 games as defensive back
- **Thad Stanford**, 6'0", 190 pounds, junior, Midland, MI – started 9 games at offensive right end
- Ralph Stribe, 6'1", 205 pounds, senior, Detroit - tackle
- **Dick Strozewski**, 6'0", 200 pounds, senior, South Bend, IN – started 5 games as offensive left tackle
- **Bob Timm**, 5'11", 185 pounds, senior, Toledo, OH – started 8 games as offensive left guard
- **David Tinkham**, 5'10", 178 pounds, senior, East Grand Rapids, MI – started 9 games as defensive back
- **Ted Topor**, 6'1", 212 pounds, senior, East Chicago, IN – started 9 games as quarterback
- Bob Topp, 6'2", 190 pounds, junior, Kalamazoo, MI - end
- **Art Walker**, 5'11", 198 pounds, sophomore, South Haven, MI – started 9 games as defensive left tackle
- **Ronald Williams**, 5'9", 185 pounds, junior, Massillon, OH – started 7 games as defensive left guard
- Thomas Witherspoon, 5'11", 185 pounds, senior, Detroit - halfback
- **Roger Zatkoff**, 6'2", 210 pounds, senior, Hamtramck, MI – started 9 games as linebacker, 1 game as offensive right tackle

=== Coaching staff ===
- Head coach: Bennie Oosterbaan
- Assistant coaches:

- Jack Blott - line coach
- George Ceithaml - backfield coach
- Cliff Keen - head wrestling coach and assistant football coach
- Bill Orwig - end coach
- Don Robinson - junior varsity coach
- Wally Weber - freshman coach and scout
- J. T. White - assistant line coach

- Trainer: Jim Hunt
- Manager: Gerry Dudley

== Awards and honors ==
Honors and awards for the 1952 season went to the following individuals.

- Captain: Merritt Green
- All-Americans: Lowell Perry
- All-Conference: Roger Zatkoff, Art Walker, Bob Timm, Dick O'Shaughnessy, Ted Kress
- Most Valuable Player: Ted Topor
- Meyer Morton Award: Gene Knutson
