= 1952 Wisconsin Badgers football team =

American college football season

1952 Wisconsin Badgers football

Big Ten co-champion

Rose Bowl, L 0–7 vs. USC
- Conference: Big Ten Conference

Ranking
- Coaches: No. 10
- AP: No. 11
- Record: 6–3–1 (4–1–1 Big Ten)
- Head coach: Ivy Williamson (4th season)
- MVP: Dave Suminski
- Captain: George O'Brien
- Home stadium: Camp Randall Stadium

1952 Big Ten Conference football standings
	Conf.					Overall
Team	W		L		T	W		L		T
No. 11 Wisconsin +	4	–	1	–	1	6	–	3	–	1
No. 18 Purdue +	4	–	1	–	1	4	–	3	–	2
No. 17 Ohio State	5	–	2	–	0	6	–	3	–	0
Michigan	4	–	2	–	0	5	–	4	–	0
Minnesota	3	–	1	–	2	4	–	3	–	2
Illinois	2	–	5	–	0	4	–	5	–	0
Northwestern	2	–	5	–	0	2	–	6	–	1
Iowa	2	–	5	–	0	2	–	7	–	0
Indiana	1	–	5	–	0	2	–	7	–	0
+ – Conference co-champions; Rankings from AP Poll

The 1952 Wisconsin Badgers football team was an American football team that represented the University of Wisconsin as a member of the Big Ten Conference during the 1952 Big Ten season. In their fourth year under head coach Ivy Williamson, the Badgers compiled a 6–3–1 record (4–1–1 in conference games), tied with Purdue for the Big Ten championship, and outscored opponents by a total of 228 to 150. It was Wisconsin's first Big Ten championship since 1912. Against ranked opponents during the regular season, the Badgers defeated No. 2 Illinois and lost to No. 8 UCLA. During the week of October 6, after defeating Illinois, Wisconsin was ranked at No. 1 in the AP poll for the first and only time in program history. The Badgers concluded the season with a 7–0 loss to USC in the Rose Bowl. It was the Badgers' first bowl game. They were ranked No. 11 in the final AP poll.

Tackle Dave Suminski was selected as the team's most valuable player. Suminski and fullback Alan Ameche received first-team honors on the 1952 All-America team. Ameche ranked fourth in the nation with 936 rushing yards. Sophomore quarterback Jim Haluska ranked among the country's leading passers with 1,410 passing yards and a 56.3% completion percentage.

Wisconsin played its home games at Camp Randall Stadium in Madison, Wisconsin.

== Schedule ==
Date	Opponent	Rank	Site	Result	Attendance	Source
September 27	Marquette*	No. 7	Camp Randall Stadium; Madison, WI	W 42–19	51,303	
October 4	No. 2 Illinois	No. 8	Camp Randall Stadium; Madison, WI	W 20–6	52,071	
October 11	at Ohio State	No. 1	Ohio Stadium; Columbus, OH	L 14–23	80,345	
October 18	at Iowa	No. 12	Iowa Stadium; Iowa City, IA (rivalry)	W 42–13	45,050	
October 25	No. 8 UCLA*	No. 10	Camp Randall Stadium; Madison, WI	L 7–20	52,131	
November 1	at Rice*	No. 18	Rice Stadium; Houston, TX	W 21–7	36,000	
November 8	Northwestern^{†}	No. 18	Camp Randall Stadium; Madison, WI	W 24–20	52,131	
November 15	at Indiana	No. 15	Memorial Stadium; Bloomington, IN	W 37–14	22,000	
November 22	Minnesota	No. 13	Camp Randall Stadium; Madison, WI (rivalry)	T 21–21	52,131	
January 1, 1953	vs. No. 5 USC*	No. 11	Rose Bowl Stadium; Pasadena, CA (Rose Bowl)	L 0–7	101,500	
*Non-conference game; ^{†}Homecoming; Rankings from AP Poll released prior to the game

== Game summaries ==
=== Marquette ===
Marquette at Wisconsin

Team	1	2	3	4	Total
Marquette	6	0	7	6	19
• Wisconsin	7	21	14	0	42

- Date: September 27
- Location: Camp Randall Stadium, Madison, WI
- Game attendance: 51,303

On September 27, Wisconsin opened its season with a 42–19 victory over Marquette before a crowd of 51,303 at Camp Randall Stadium in Madison, Wisconsin. Sophomore Jim Haluska, in his first college game, completed 14 of 21 passes for 237 yards and three touchdowns to set a new Wisconsin single-game record.On defense, the Badgers gave up 169 rushing yards and 109 passing yards.

=== Illinois ===
Illinois at Wisconsin

Team	1	2	3	4	Total
Illinois	0	0	0	6	6
• Wisconsin	6	0	7	7	20

- Date: October 4
- Location: Camp Randall Stadium, Madison, WI
- Game attendance: 52,071

ON October 4, Wisconsin updet No. 2 Illinois, the defending Big Ten champion, 20–6, before a crowd of 52,071, the largest ever to attend a football game up to that point at Camp Randall Stadium. Wisconsin dominated that game, tallying 334 rushing yards while holding the Illini to only 60 rushing yards. The Badgers also had a 100-67 edge in passing yardage. Alan Ameche was the game's leading rusher with 116 yards on 32 carries. Harland "The Jet" Carl added 113 rushing yards on 13 carries, an average of 7.2 yards per carry. Quarterback Jim Haluska completed only six of 14 passes for 100 yards with two interceptions.

=== Ohio State ===
Wisconsin at Ohio State

Team	1	2	3	4	Total
Wisconsin	0	7	0	7	14
• Ohio State	6	0	7	10	23

- Date: October 11
- Location: Ohio Stadium, Columbus, WI
- Game attendance: 80,345

On October 11, the Badgers lost to Ohio State, 23–14, before a crowd of 80,345 at Ohio Stadium in Columbus, Ohio. Buckeye freshman Howard "Hopalong" Cassady "sped for sensational long gains that shredded the vaunted Badger defense." Wisconsin had been a heavy favorite, and after the game, fans swarmed the field and carried second-year Ohio coach Woody Hayes on their shoulders to the locker room.John Dietrich of The Plain Dealer wrote that the game established Hayes as "one of the great coaches of the nation" and called it "the greatest football game ever played by an Ohio team."

=== Iowa ===
Wisconsin at Iowa

Team	1	2	3	4	Total
• Wisconsin	7	10	13	12	42
Iowa	7	0	0	6	13

- Date: October 18
- Location: Iowa Stadium, Iowa City, IA
- Game attendance: 45,050

On October 18, Wisconsin defeated rival Iowa, 42–13, before a crowd of 45,050 at Iowa Stadium in Iowa City, Iowa. Early in the game, Iowa's Bernie Bennett returned a punt 63 yards for a touchdown. Iowa then tallied six touchdowns, aided by eight turnovers – six interceptions and two fumbles. Iowa was held to 23 rushing yards. On the first punt of his college career, Wisconsin captain George O'Brien set a Big Ten record with a 96-yard kick that rolled dead on Iowa's three-yard line.

=== UCLA ===
UCLA at Wisconsin

Team	1	2	3	4	Total
• UCLA	0	7	0	13	20
Wisconsin	0	0	7	0	7

- Date: October 25
- Location: Camp Randall Stadium, Madison, WI
- Game attendance: 52,131

October 25, Wisconsin, ranked No. 10 in the AP poll, lost, to No. 8 UCLA, 20–7, before a crowd of 52,131 at Camp Randall Stadium in Madison, Wisconsin. It was Wisconsin's first home loss since 1949. Wisconsin's offense was stymied throughout the game by a tough UCLA defense. The Badgers tallied only 48 net rushing yards and were forced to rely on passing. Jim Haluska threw a school record 38 passes, completing 18 with five interceptions. Two fourth-quarter interceptions turned the game in UCLA's favor. Pete Dailey's interception of Haluska gave the Bruins the ball at the Wisconsin 25-yard line, and the Bruins scored the go-ahead touchdown on a five-yard pass from Paul Cameron to Bill Stits. UCLA sealed the game when Stits intercepted Haluska and returned it 23 yards for a touchdown.

=== Rice ===
Wisconsin at Rice

Team	1	2	3	4	Total
• Wisconsin	0	14	7	0	21
Rice	0	0	0	7	7

- Date: November 1
- Location: Rice Stadium, Houston, TX
- Game attendance: 36,000

On November 1, Wisconsin defeated Rice, 21–7, before a crowd of 36,000 at Rice Stadium in Houston. Quarterback Jim Haluska threw for 139 yards and was responsible for all three touchdowns, passing for two and running a quarterback sneak for the third. Alan Ameche rushed for 116 yards on 23 carries.

=== Northwestern ===
Northwestern at Wisconsin

Team	1	2	3	4	Total
Northwestern	7	0	7	6	20
• Wisconsin	7	14	0	3	24

- Date: November 8
- Location: Camp Randall Stadium, Madison, WI
- Game attendance: 52,131

On November 8, Wisconsin defeated Northwestern, 24–20, before a homecoming crowd of 52,131 at Camp Randall Stadium. Wisconsin held a 21–7 lead at halftime. Northwestern added a touchdown in the third quarter, and the Badgers extended their lead with a field goal early in the fourth quarter. Northwestern scored its final touchdown with 3:15 remaining. With less than a minute remaining, Alan Ameche fumbled, and Northwestern recovered, but the Badger defense held. Wisconsin tallied 419 yards (293 rushing, 126 passing) and held Northwetern to 244 yards (114 rushing, 130 passing). Ameche finished the game with 159 rushing yards on 21 carries.

=== Indiana ===
Wisconsin at Indiana

Team	1	2	3	4	Total
• Wisconsin	13	3	7	14	37
Indiana	0	0	14	0	14

- Date: November 15
- Location: Memorial Stadium, Bloomington, IN
- Game attendance: 22,000

On November 15, Wisconsin defeated Indiana, 37–14, before a crowd of 25,000 on a warm "Indian summer" afternoon in Bloomington, Indiana. The Badgers gained 279 rushing yards, including 162 yards and three touchdowns by Alan Ameche on 20 carries. Jim Haluska completed 11 of 18 passes for 166 yards.

=== Minnesota ===
Minnesota at Wisconsin

Team	1	2	3	4	Total
Minnesota	7	7	0	7	21
Wisconsin	7	7	7	0	21

- Date: November 22
- Location: Camp Randall Stadium, Madison, WI
- Game attendance: 52,131

On November 22, Wisconsin and rival Minnesota played to a 21–21 tie before a crowd of 52,131 at Camp Randall Stadium. In the last 65 seconds, the ball changed hands four times (including two interceptions thrown by Jim Haluska and one thrown by Paul Giel) as each team tried to break the tie. Giel starred for the Gophers, scoring one rushing touchdown and passing for two. Giel had 252 combined rushing and passing yards. For the Badgers, Alan Ameche rushed for 125 yards and two touchdowns.

The outcome left Wisconsin in a tie with Purdue for the Big Ten title, the Badgers' first conference football championship since 1912. One day after the game, the Big Ten athletic directors voted to send Wisconsin, rather than Purdue, to the Rose Bowl game as the conference's representative.

=== USC—Rose Bowl ===
Wisconsin at USC

Team	1	2	3	4	Total
Wisconsin	0	0	0	0	0
• USC	0	0	7	0	7

- Date: January 1, 1953
- Location: Rose Bowl, Pasadena, CA
- Game attendance: 101,500

On January 1, 1953, Wisconsin lost to USC, 7–0, before a crowd of 101,500 in the 1953 Rose Bowl game in Pasadena, California. Wisconsin's loss broke a six-year Big Ten winning streak in the Rose Bowl dating back to the 1947 Rose Bowl. USC scored the game's only points in the third quarter on a 22-yard touchdown pass from Rudy Bukich to Al Carmichael. For the Badgers, Alan Ameche tallied 133 rushing yards on 28 carries, and Jim Haluska completed 11 of 26 passes for 142 yards. The Badgers out-gained the Trojans by a total of 353 yards to 233 yards.

== Personnel ==
=== Players ===
- Alan Ameche, fullback, Kenosha, WI
- Erv Andrykoski, offensive end, Milwaukee
- Charlie Berndt, offensive tackle, Wausau, WI
- Roy Burks, defensive halfback, Louisville, KY
- Tom Canny, halfback, junior, Chicago
- Harland Carl, left halfback, Greenwood, WI
- Jim Craine, center, senior, Watertown, WI
- Mike Cwayna, center, junior
- John Dixon, linebacker, junior, Wisconsin Dells, WI
- Roger Dornburg, back, Naperville, IL
- Terry Durkin, guard, senior, Madison, WI
- Norb Esser, offensive end
- Windy Gulseth, linebacker, Madison, WI
- Burt Hable, safety, Bloomer, WI
- Jim Haluska, quarterback, Racine, WI
- Mark Hoegh, tackle, junior, Kaukauna, WI
- Bill Hutchinson, left halfback, Chicago
- Bob Kennedy, guard, Rhinelander, WI
- Carl Martin, defensive tackle, Highland Park, IL
- George O'Brien, captain and guard, Park Ridge, IL
- Kent Peters, end, senior, Ellyn, IL
- Art Prchlik, offensive tackle, Cleveland, OH
- Paul Shwaiko, defensive halfback, Kenosha, WI
- George Simkowski, center, senior, Chicago
- George Steinmetz, offensive guard, Madison, WI
- Clarence Stensby, guard, sophomore, Chicago
- Dave Suminski, tackle, senior, 198 pounds, Ashland, WI
- Jim Temp, end, sophomore, LaCrosse, WI
- Don Ursin, tackle, sophomore, Chicago
- Gust Vergetis, quarterback, Milwaukee
- Don Voss, defensive end, Milwaukee
- Hugo Wimmer, defensive end, senior, Sheboygan, WI
- Jerry Witt, right halfback, Marshfield, WI
- Jerry Wuhrman, Milwaukee

=== Coaching staff and administration ===
1952 Wisconsin coaching staff. Kneeling: Fred E. Marsh, Ivy Williamson, Bob Odell. Standing: George Lamphear, Paul R. Shaw, Milt Bruhn

- Head coach: Ivy Williamson
- Assistant coaches

- Bob Odell, backfield coach
- Milt Bruhn, line coach
- Paul R. Shaw, end coach
- Fred E. Marsh, junior varsity coach and head scout
- George Lamphear, freshman football coach

- Athletic director: Guy Sundt

== Statistics ==
In nine regular-season games, Wisconsin's statistical leaders included:

Alan Ameche gained 946 rushing yard on 205 carries. He ranked fourth nationally in rushing yardage.

Quarterback Jim Haluska completed 112 of 199 passes (56.3%) for 1,410 yards, 12 touchdowns, and 18 interceptions. Haluska set Wisconsin single-season records for pass completions, pass attempts, touchdown passes, and passing yardage. He also set a Wisconsin single-game record with 237 yards against Marquette.

Four Wisconsin players received first-team honors from the AP or United Press (UP) on the 1952 All-Big Ten Conference football team: Suminski (AP); Ameche (AP/UP); offensive guard George O'Brien (UP); and defensive guard Bob Kennedy (AP/UP). O'Brien was the team captain.

== Awards and honors ==
Tackle Dave Suminski was selected as the team's most valuable player and was selected by the Associated Press (AP) as a first-team player on the 1952 All-America team. Back Alan Ameche received first-team All-America honors from the Central Press.

Four Wisconsin players received first-team honors from the AP or United Press (UP) on the 1952 All-Big Ten Conference football team: Suminski (AP); Ameche (AP/UP); offensive guard George O'Brien (UP); and defensive guard Bob Kennedy (AP/UP). O'Brien was the team captain.

== Wisconsin players in the NFL draft ==
Player	Position	Draft Year	Round	Pick	NFL club
Bob Kennedy	Back	1953	6	67	Green Bay Packers
Charley Berndt	Tackle	1953	10	111	Chicago Cardinals
Harland Carl	Back	1953	14	161	Chicago Bears
Dave Suminski	Tackle	1953	15	171	Washington Redskins
Jim Haluska	Back	1954	30	354	Chicago Bears
Alan Ameche	Back	1955	1	3	Baltimore Colts
