= John Morrow (American football) =

American football player (1933–2017)

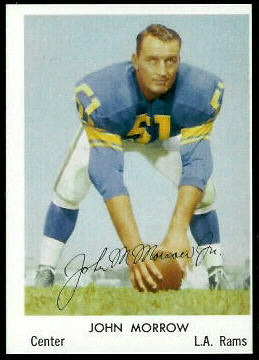
- Morrow with the Rams in 1959

No. 51, 56
- Positions: Center, guard

Personal information
- Born: April 27, 1933; Port Huron, Michigan, U.S.
- Died: October 21, 2017 (aged 84); Sherwood, Wisconsin, U.S.
- Listed height: 6 ft 3 in (1.91 m)
- Listed weight: 244 lb (111 kg)

Career information
- High school: Ann Arbor (Ann Arbor, Michigan)
- College: Michigan (1952–1955)
- NFL draft: 1956: 28th round, 336th overall pick

Career history
- Los Angeles Rams (1956, 1958–1959); Cleveland Browns (1960–1966)

Awards and highlights
- NFL champion (1964); Second-team All-Pro (1965); 2× Pro Bowl (1961, 1963)

Career NFL statistics
- Games played: 125
- Games started: 119
- Fumble recoveries: 4
- Stats at Pro Football Reference

John Melville Morrow Jr. (April 27, 1933 – October 21, 2017) was an American professional football player in the National Football League (NFL). He played college football for the Michigan Wolverines from 1953 to 1955. He played center and guard in the NFL for the Los Angeles Rams and Cleveland Browns from 1956 to 1966 (missing the 1957 season while serving in the United States Army). After being traded to the Browns in 1960, he started 90 consecutive games at center before suffering a broken leg during a November 6, 1966 game, which was the last game of his 10-year NFL career.

Morrow was selected to play in the Pro Bowl in 1961 and 1963, and the Associated Press named him second-team All-Pro in 1965. Morrow was the starting center on the 1964 Cleveland Browns team that won the 1964 NFL Championship Game and on the 1965 Browns team that lost the 1965 NFL Championship Game. He played on offensive lines with the Browns' teams that some consider among the best of their era and/or in NFL history.

== Early life ==
Morrow was born on April 27, 1933, in Port Huron, Michigan, to John and Dorothy (Frack) Morrow. He was one of four children. As a 12-year old, he was a member of the winning 100-yard relay swim team in Ann Arbor, Michigan's annual city swimming meet. He attended Ann Arbor High School and the Staunton Military Academy. He played tackle and punter on Ann Arbor's football team, and center on Ann Arbor's basketball team.

Morrow played on Ann Arbor's undefeated 1949 football team, which won the Five–A League championship. He recovered a fumble on defense in the championship game. He played on Ann Arbor's 1950 football team that also went undefeated and won its second consecutive Five–A League title. Morrow was captain of the basketball team in the 1950–51 season, and the team's leading scorer. In that season's opening game victory, Morrow had 28 of his team's 44 points.

After graduating from Ann Arbor High School in 1951, Morrow attended Staunton Military Academy, located in Staunton, Virginia. He attended Staunton for one year (graduating in 1952), where he played varsity football and basketball. The Staunton football team was undefeated. From 1949 and 1950 at Ann Arbor, through 1951 at Staunton, Morrow's football teams never lost a game, going 25–0.

In 2017, Morrow was inducted in the inaugural class of the Pioneer High School Hall of Honor (formerly known as Ann Arbor High School). He has also been inducted into the Staunton Military Academy Sports Hall of Fame.

Morrow also had a musical background growing up, playing the trumpet, trombone, and baritone horn. He played the trombone and baritone horn publicly even before he was a teenager. Morrow continued playing through his teen years, and played trombone with the Blue Knights at Staunton. Morrow continued playing trombone while at the University of Michigan.

== University of Michigan ==
Morrow enrolled at the University of Michigan in 1952. He played freshman football in 1952, and played for Bennie Oosterbaan's Wolverines varsity teams from 1953 to 1955. Morrow attended Michigan at a time when athletic scholarships were limited, and he worked at various jobs over his years there. He sold programs at sports events, ran his fraternity's kitchen, and scraped ice at hockey games.

Morrow played center and tackle on the football team. He started seven games while at Michigan. He started four games at center for the 1953 Michigan Wolverines football team and three games at tackle for the 1954 team. He became a center in 1953 when starting center and team captain Dick O'Shaugnessy was injured. Morris had to learn the position, finding it a difficult challenge. He also played linebacker on defense. He was switched back to tackle in 1954, where Michigan had a need because of a lack of experienced players at tackle.

Morrow went into his senior season (1955) as a 228 lb (103.4 kg) tackle. He played that season, though he reportedly did not start any games in 1955. In the annual rivalry game against Michigan State on October 1, Morrow made the critical play for Michigan in blocking a punt that led to Michigan's second touchdown in a 14–7 victory. The following week against Army, he recovered a fumble on defense.

Among others, his Michigan teammates included future NFL players Terry Barr (1954 and 1955) and Ron Kramer (1954 and 1955). Morrow's younger brother, Gordon Morrow, played at the end position for Michigan from 1955 to 1958.

== Professional football ==
=== Los Angeles Rams ===
Morrow was selected by the Los Angeles Rams in the 28th round (336th overall pick out of 360) of the 1956 NFL draft. He began the 1956 season as a guard, but eventually became the starting center that year. He started six of the Rams' 12 games, playing under future Hall of Fame head coach Sid Gillman. Morrow got his first start, as a guard, in the Rams' seventh game; playing alongside Dick Daugherty at center. He started the next two games at guard, and then replaced Daugherty at center in the final three games, after Daugherty was moved to linebacker due to injuries on the Rams' defense. Although the 6 ft 3 in (1.91 m) Morrow only weighed 220 lb (99.8 kg), Gillman placed great value on an offensive lineman's speed and mobility, along with size and "surliness".

Gillman later described Morrow as the Rams' fastest improving player in 1956. In January 1957, Morrow was inducted into the United States Army, and did not play in the NFL that season. He completed his military service in September 1958, and returned to the Rams before the start of the 1958 season. Gillman started Morrow at center for all 12 games that season. Morrow started 10 games in 1959 at center for the Rams, and one at guard. Rams linebacker Les Richter had to play in three games at center for the Rams that year, in part due to Morrow suffering an injury and in part due to the loss of other linemen to injury or suspension. Richter started at center in the 10th and 12th games of the season; with Morrow starting at guard in Game 10 and missing Game 12 with an injury. In March 1960, the Rams traded Morrow to the Cleveland Browns for center Art Hunter, a four-year veteran.

=== Cleveland Browns ===
Morrow next played seven seasons with the Cleveland Browns from 1960 to 1966. He did not miss a game from 1960 through November 6, 1966, starting 90 consecutive games for the Browns. After starting the first eight games of the 1966 season, Morrow suffered a broken leg in the eighth game of the 1966 season against the Pittsburgh Steelers, which became the last game of his career. Morrow was twice selected to play in the Pro Bowl (1961 and 1963).

Morrow played under future Hall of Fame coach Paul Brown from 1960 to 1962 with the Browns. It is reported that Brown traded for Morrow because of his speed as a lineman and ability to lead sweeps and block for the Browns future Hall of Fame running back Jim Brown. Among his starting offensive linemates in 1960 were multi-time Pro Bowl and first-team All Pro left tackle Dick Schafrath, and future Hall of Fame right guard Gene Hickerson. Early in Morrow's career with the Browns, the offensive line also included two more of the Browns' greatest offensive linemen in team history, Jim Ray Smith and Pro Football Hall of Famer Mike McCormack.

Morrow started alongside Schafrath for his entire Browns career, and alongside Hickerson as a starter every year during Morrow's career except 1961 when Hickerson missed the season with an injury, and part of the 1962 season when Hickerson missed more games with injuries. John Wooten filled in for Hickerson in 1961 and part of 1962 at right guard, and then played left guard for the Browns from 1963 to 1968.

In 1963, the Browns compiled a 10–4 record, finishing second in the NFL's East Division. The following season, the Browns were 1964 NFL Champions, defeating the Baltimore Colts in the title game, 27–0. The offensive line that season included Morrow, Hickerson, Schafrath, and Wooten, along with Monte Clark and John Brown at right tackle in 1964 (with Clark starting in the championship game). In 1964, the Browns ranked first in the NFL in average yards per rushing attempt; second in points scored, fewest quarterback sacks allowed and fewest yards lost on sacks; and third in total yards and rushing yards. The Colts' defense led the NFL in fewest points allowed and most sacks, but in the championship game, the Browns' offensive line allowed only one sack, while Jim Brown had 114 rushing yards and the Browns had 339 total yards compared to 181 yards for the Colts.

In 1965, with a starting offensive line of Morrow, Hickerson, Schafrath, Wooten, and Clark, the Browns reached the NFL title game again, losing to the Green Bay Packers, 23–12. Morrow was named second-team All-Pro by the Associated Press in 1965, along with Hickerson; while Schafrath was named first team All-Pro that year. The Browns ranked first in the NFL in rushing yards. Jim Brown, who was considered the greatest running back in football history at the time (and is still considered among the greatest ever), said of the 1965 offensive line "'They are the best in the business'", and attributed much of his success to the line. The Browns' 1964 and 1965 offensive line has been called the most famous in Browns' history and one of the best ever in the NFL.

In July 1966, Jim Brown announced his retirement from the NFL. Even without him, the Browns were 5–2 going into the 1966 season's eighth game against the Pittsburgh Steelers on November 6. Morrow's leg was broken during that game; in what would be his last NFL game. On November 10, the Browns placed Morrow on the injured reserve list. The Browns finished the season, 9–5.

The Browns left Morrow exposed to the 1967 expansion draft, and he was selected by the New Orleans Saints in February 1967. He played in one exhibition game for the Saints before being released, in late August. Morrow had signed a two-year contract with the Browns that had called for him to be paid $25,000 in 1967, and then signed a contract with the Saints for $30,000 in 1967. He brought a lawsuit against both teams in 1968, claiming that one of them owed him payment under that team's contract for 1967.

== Legacy ==
In a 2012 listing of the Browns' 100 greatest players, Morrow was ranked No. 64, being described as excelling in both pass and run blocking. He was ranked No. 78 in a 2019 list of the Browns' 100 greatest players, emphasizing his ability at "being able to get out in front of runs and make blocks in space", the skills that Paul Brown had focused upon when he traded for Morrow in 1960.

== Personal life and death ==
After retiring, Morrow worked for the Menasha Paper Company in Wisconsin, and lived in Sherwood, Wisconsin, near Appleton. Morrow died on October 21, 2017 from heart disease. His wife of 61 years, Gail (Lundstrom) Morrow, had died 12 days earlier.
