= 1952 Purdue Boilermakers football team =

American college football season

1952 Purdue Boilermakers football

Big Ten co-champion
- Conference: Big Ten Conference

Ranking
- Coaches: No. 12
- AP: No. 18
- Record: 4–3–2 (4–1–1 Big Ten)
- Head coach: Stu Holcomb (6th season)
- MVP: Earl Heninger
- Captains: Bernie Flowers; Dale Samuels
- Home stadium: Ross–Ade Stadium

1952 Big Ten Conference football standings
	Conf.					Overall
Team	W		L		T	W		L		T
No. 11 Wisconsin +	4	–	1	–	1	6	–	3	–	1
No. 18 Purdue +	4	–	1	–	1	4	–	3	–	2
No. 17 Ohio State	5	–	2	–	0	6	–	3	–	0
Michigan	4	–	2	–	0	5	–	4	–	0
Minnesota	3	–	1	–	2	4	–	3	–	2
Illinois	2	–	5	–	0	4	–	5	–	0
Northwestern	2	–	5	–	0	2	–	6	–	1
Iowa	2	–	5	–	0	2	–	7	–	0
Indiana	1	–	5	–	0	2	–	7	–	0
+ – Conference co-champions; Rankings from AP Poll

The 1952 Purdue Boilermakers football team was an American football team that represented Purdue University during the 1952 Big Ten Conference football season. In their sixth season under head coach Stu Holcomb, the Boilermakers compiled a 4–3–2 record, finished in a tie with Wisconsin for first place in the Big Ten Conference with a 4–1–1 record against conference opponents, and outscored opponents by a total of 188 to 151.

Notable players on the 1952 Purdue team included quarterback Dale Samuels, end Bernie Flowers, center Walter Cudzik, and tackle Fred Preziosio. Flowers was selected as a consensus first-team end on the 1952 College Football All-America Team.

== Schedule ==
Date	Opponent	Rank	Site	Result	Attendance	Source
September 27	at Penn State*		New Beaver Field; State College, PA	T 20–20	20,506	
October 4	at No. 15 Ohio State		Ohio Stadium; Columbus, OH	W 21–14	75,417	
October 11	Iowa^{†}	No. 16	Ross–Ade Stadium; West Lafayette, IN	W 41–14	34,000	
October 18	Notre Dame*	No. 9	Ross–Ade Stadium; West Lafayette, IN (rivalry)	L 14–26	49,000	
October 25	at Illinois		Memorial Stadium; Champaign, IL (rivalry)	W 40–12	71,119	
November 1	No. 1 Michigan State*	No. 8	Ross–Ade Stadium; West Lafayette, IN	L 7–14	49,500	
November 8	at Minnesota	No. 9	Memorial Stadium; Minneapolis, MN	T 14–14	53,193	
November 15	at No. 20 Michigan	No. 10	Michigan Stadium; Ann Arbor, MI	L 10–21	58,964	
November 22	Indiana		Ross–Ade Stadium; West Lafayette, IN (Old Oaken Bucket)	W 21–16	40,000	
*Non-conference game; ^{†}Homecoming; Rankings from AP Poll released prior to the game

== Game summaries ==
=== Ohio State ===
- Max Schmaling 23 rushes, 139 yards

=== Illinois ===
- Earl Heninger 17 rushes, 112 yards
- Max Schmaling 16 rushes, 112 yards

== Roster ==
- Johnny Allen, C
- Frank Angelotti, T
- Tom Bettis, G
- Rex Brock, HB
- Wayne Browning, T
- Bill Bruner, T
- Dan Crncic, E
- Walt Cudzik, C
- Phil Ehrman, HB
- Roy Evans, QB
- Bernie Flowers, E
- Froncie Gutman, QB
- Allen Hager, G
- Earl Heninger, HB
- Jack Houston, G
- Curt Jones, HB
- John Kerr, E
- Philip Klezek, HB
- Joe Krupa, T
- Bob Leonard, HB-FB
- Fred Locke, E
- Phil Mateja, QB
- Tom McNamee, E-QB
- Norman Montgomery, FB
- Ray Pacer, T
- Ken Panfil, T
- Fred Preziosio, T-G
- Tom Redinger, HB-E
- James Reichert, FB-K
- Tom Roggeman, G
- Dale Samuels, QB
- Max Schmaling, FB-HB
- Jerald Stupeck, C
- Jerry Thorpe, HB-FB
- Walt Viellieu, T
- Dale Whiteaker, T-E
- Jim Wojciehowski, E
- Joe Wojtys, T
- Ed Zembal, HB
