= Harland Carl =

American football player (1931–2023)

No. 41
- Position: Halfback

Personal information
- Born: October 1, 1931; Greenwood, Wisconsin, U.S.
- Died: July 28, 2023 (aged 91); Kimberly, Wisconsin, U.S.
- Listed height: 6 ft 0 in (1.83 m)
- Listed weight: 195 lb (88 kg)

Career information
- High school: Greenwood
- College: Wisconsin (1950–1953)
- NFL draft: 1953: 14th round, 161st overall pick

Career history
- Chicago Bears (1956)

Career NFL statistics
- Rushing yards: 66
- Rushing average: 2.3
- Receptions: 2
- Receiving yards: 31
- Total touchdowns: 1
- Stats at Pro Football Reference

Harland Irvin Carl (October 1, 1931 – July 28, 2023) was an American professional football player and coach. As a halfback in the National Football League (NFL), he helped the Chicago Bears reach the 1956 NFL Championship Game before a knee injury ended his career.

Carl grew up in Greenwood, Wisconsin, and both played and coached football for the Wisconsin Badgers. As a Badgers player, Carl ran for more than 100 yards in a game four times and is one of only 11 players in program history to top 100 yards in a game as a true freshman.

Carl shared a backfield with Heisman Trophy winner Alan Ameche and led Wisconsin to the program's first bowl game appearance: the 1953 Rose Bowl. While the Badgers lost that game 7–0 to the USC Trojans, Carl was part of Wisconsin's best chance to score. According to a news report, in the waning minutes of the game, Wisconsin quarterback Jim Haluska targeted Carl in the end zone: "Carl juggled the perfectly thrown pass from Haluska, and his momentum carried him out of bounds before he was able to secure it."

Carl was selected 161st overall in the 14th round of the 1953 NFL draft and served two years in the Army before joining the Bears. He played nine games for the Bears, scoring his lone touchdown against San Francisco in a 38–21 win. Carl was the last Bears player to wear No. 41 before Brian Piccolo, after which the team retired the number.

After his playing career, he joined the Neenah High School football coaching staff from 1958 through 1966, the last four years as head coach, where he accumulated four straight Mid-Eastern Conference titles with an overall 27–3–2 record. Carl returned to the Wisconsin Badgers as an assistant coach under Milt Bruhn in 1966 and under John Coatta from 1967 to 1969.

Carl later worked for fellow retired NFL player Bob Skoronski at Valley School Supply in Appleton, Wis., as well as at Wisconsin Athletic Products, where he sold a basketball rack called the "Rol-O-Bin" manufactured in Wisconsin and used in gyms across the country.

== Personal life and death ==
While serving as a lieutenant in the U.S. Army stationed in Fort Eustis, Carl got engaged to Lesley Jean Riley in 1955. They had four children: Lesa, Rick, Jeff and Greg. He died on July 28, 2023, at the age of 91.

== See also ==
- List of Chicago Bears players
