= Al Carmichael =

American football player (1928–2019)

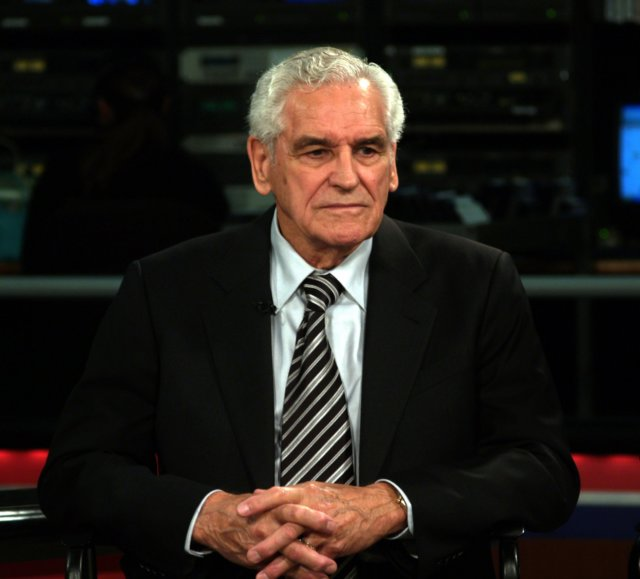
- Carmichael in 2006

No. 42, 48, 81, 40
- Positions: Halfback, return specialist

Personal information
- Born: November 10, 1928; Boston, Massachusetts, U.S.
- Died: September 7, 2019 (aged 90); Palm Desert, California, U.S.
- Listed height: 6 ft 1 in (1.85 m)
- Listed weight: 200 lb (91 kg)

Career information
- High school: Gardena (Gardena, California)
- College: USC (1950–1952)
- NFL draft: 1953: 1st round, 7th overall pick

Career history
- Green Bay Packers (1953–1958); Calgary Stampeders (1959); Denver Broncos (1960–1961)

Awards and highlights
- 2× NFL kickoff return yards leader (1956, 1957); Green Bay Packers Hall of Fame; Second-team All-PCC (1952); Santa Ana College Hall of Fame; National Junior Colleges Hall of Fame; All Services Hall of Fame; Orange County (CA) Sports Hall of Fame

Career NFL/AFL statistics
- Rushing yards: 947
- Rushing average: 4.3
- Receptions: 112
- Receiving yards: 1,633
- Return yards: 5,710
- Total touchdowns: 14
- Stats at Pro Football Reference

Albert Reinhold Carmichael (November 10, 1928 – September 7, 2019) was an American professional football player who was a halfback and return specialist in the National Football League (NFL) and American Football League (AFL).

Carmichael holds the distinction of scoring the first touchdown in AFL history, a 59-yard pass reception from Frank Tripucka for the Denver Broncos against the Boston Patriots on September 9, 1960.

== Early life ==
Carmichael prepped at Gardena High School.

== College career ==
Following a three-year enlistment in the Marine Corps - he also played for the El Toro Marines, gaining about 1,000 yards in each of two years at the El Toro Marine Air Corps Station - Carmichael played one year of college football at Santa Ana Junior College. At Santa Ana, he rushed for 1,110 yards with 19 TDs to earn Little All-American honors and was on a Junior Rose Bowl squad. Carmichael then played at the University of Southern California (USC). As a Trojan, he was a three-year letter winner (1950-51-52), leading the team in rushing as a sophomore and in kick returns as a senior. At USC he scored the winning touchdown in the 1953 Rose Bowl against Wisconsin. Carmichael caught a third quarter pass from back-up quarterback Rudy Bukich to win the game, 7–0.

== Professional career ==
Carmichael played for the Green Bay Packers of the National Football League between 1953 and 1958; then he was with the Denver Broncos of the American Football League in 1960 and 1961. He twice led pro football in kick off return yards. He scored the first touchdown in American Football League history, a 59-yard pass reception from Frank Tripucka for the Broncos against the Boston Patriots on September 9, 1960. He also has the tenth longest play in NFL history, a 106-yard kick off return for touchdown, at the time an NFL record held until 2007. When he retired, Carmichael was the NFL's all-time leader in kickoff return yardage.

Following his playing career, Carmichael was inducted into the Green Bay Packers, Santa Ana College, All-Services and Orange County Halls of Fame.

== Stunt double ==
Carmichael was a stuntman in more than 50 films, including Jim Thorpe – All-American (1951) for Burt Lancaster (1951), Saturday's Hero (1951), All-American (1953), Pork Chop Hill (1959), It Started with a Kiss (1959), The Big Operator, Elmer Gantry (1960), one of the doubles for Kirk Douglas in Spartacus (1960), Birdman of Alcatraz (1962), Son of Flubber (1962), How the West was Won (1962), and the TV show Rawhide.

== Family ==
Carmichael married Jan and they had three children Chris, Pam, and Stacy. He lived in Orange County working in the pool-cleaning and automobile businesses before moving to Palm Desert to sell real estate in 1984. After Jan died, Al married Barbara Durkee. Al died on September 7, 2019, in Palm Desert, California. At the time of his death, Al was survived by his wife, Barbara Durkee; two daughters, Pam and Stacy, from his marriage to Jan Carmichael; and two stepsons, Darin and Bruce Durkee.

== See also ==
- List of American Football League players
