= 1952 Indiana Hoosiers football team =

American college football season

1952 Indiana Hoosiers football
- Conference: Big Ten Conference
- Record: 2–7 (1–5 Big Ten)
- Head coach: Bernie Crimmins (1st season)
- MVP: Gene Gedman
- Captain: Gene Gedman
- Home stadium: Memorial Stadium

1952 Big Ten Conference football standings
	Conf.					Overall
Team	W		L		T	W		L		T
No. 11 Wisconsin +	4	–	1	–	1	6	–	3	–	1
No. 18 Purdue +	4	–	1	–	1	4	–	3	–	2
No. 17 Ohio State	5	–	2	–	0	6	–	3	–	0
Michigan	4	–	2	–	0	5	–	4	–	0
Minnesota	3	–	1	–	2	4	–	3	–	2
Illinois	2	–	5	–	0	4	–	5	–	0
Northwestern	2	–	5	–	0	2	–	6	–	1
Iowa	2	–	5	–	0	2	–	7	–	0
Indiana	1	–	5	–	0	2	–	7	–	0
+ – Conference co-champions; Rankings from AP Poll

The 1952 Indiana Hoosiers football team represented the Indiana Hoosiers in the 1952 Big Ten Conference football season. The Hoosiers played their home games at Memorial Stadium in Bloomington, Indiana. The team was coached by Bernie Crimmins, in his first year as head coach of the Hoosiers.

== Schedule ==
Date	Opponent	Site	Result	Attendance	Source
September 27	at No. 20 Ohio State	Ohio Stadium; Columbus, OH	L 13–33	70,208	
October 4	Iowa	Memorial Stadium; Bloomington, IN	W 20–13		
October 11	at Michigan	Michigan Stadium; Ann Arbor, MI	L 13–28	53,840	
October 18	Temple*	Memorial Stadium; Bloomington, IN	W 33–0	28,000	
October 25	at Northwestern	Dyche Stadium; Evanston, IL	L 13–23	30,000	
November 1	at Pittsburgh*	Pitt Stadium; Pittsburgh, PA	L 7–28	19,907	
November 8	No. 1 Michigan State*	Memorial Stadium; Bloomington, IN (rivalry)	L 14–41	22,000	
November 15	No. 15 Wisconsin	Memorial Stadium; Bloomington, IN	L 14–37	22,000	
November 22	at Purdue	Ross–Ade Stadium; West Lafayette, IN (Old Oaken Bucket)	L 16–21	40,000	
*Non-conference game; Rankings from AP Poll released prior to the game

== 1953 NFL draftees ==
Player	Position	Round	Pick	NFL club
Gene Gedman	Back	2	25	Detroit Lions
Pete Russo	Tackle	20	230	Baltimore Colts
