= 1952 Iowa Hawkeyes football team =

American college football season

1952 Iowa Hawkeyes football
- Conference: Big Ten Conference
- Record: 2–7 (2–5 Big Ten)
- Head coach: Forest Evashevski (1st season)
- MVP: Bill Fenton
- Captain: Bill Fenton
- Home stadium: Iowa Stadium

1952 Big Ten Conference football standings
	Conf.					Overall
Team	W		L		T	W		L		T
No. 11 Wisconsin +	4	–	1	–	1	6	–	3	–	1
No. 18 Purdue +	4	–	1	–	1	4	–	3	–	2
No. 17 Ohio State	5	–	2	–	0	6	–	3	–	0
Michigan	4	–	2	–	0	5	–	4	–	0
Minnesota	3	–	1	–	2	4	–	3	–	2
Illinois	2	–	5	–	0	4	–	5	–	0
Northwestern	2	–	5	–	0	2	–	6	–	1
Iowa	2	–	5	–	0	2	–	7	–	0
Indiana	1	–	5	–	0	2	–	7	–	0
+ – Conference co-champions; Rankings from AP Poll

The 1952 Iowa Hawkeyes football team was an American football team that represented the University of Iowa as a member of the Big Ten Conference during the 1952 Big Ten football season. In their first season under head coach Forest Evashevski, the Hawkeyes compiled a 2–7 record (2–5 in conference games), finished in a three-way tie for sixth place in the Big Ten, and were outscored by a total of 220 to 121.

The 1952 Hawkeyes gained 1,560 rushing yards and 985 passing yards. On defense, they gave up 1,650 rushing yards and 1,523 passing yards.

The team's statistical leaders included George Broeder (311 rushing yards); Burt Britzmann (37-of-94 passing for 515 yards); Dan McBride (29 receptions for 448 yards); and Broader and McBride (18 points scored each). Center Jerry Hilgenberg was later inducted into the Iowa Letterwinners Club Hall of Fame. End Bill Fenton was selected as an Academic All-American, the first Iowa player to receive the honor. Fenton also received first-team honors on the 1952 All-Big Ten Conference football team, and was selected both as Iowa's 1952 team captain and most valuable player.

The team played its home games at Iowa Stadium in Iowa City, Iowa. Home attendance was 181,164, an average of 45,291 per game.

== Schedule ==
Date	Opponent	Site	Result	Attendance	Source
September 27	at Pittsburgh*	Pitt Stadium; Pittsburgh, PA	L 14–26	24,490	
October 4	at Indiana	Memorial Stadium; Bloomington, IN	L 13–20		
October 11	at No. 16 Purdue	Ross–Ade Stadium; West Lafayette, IN	L 14–41	34,000	
October 18	No. 12 Wisconsin	Iowa Stadium; Iowa City, IA (rivalry)	L 13–42	45,050	
October 25	No. 14 Ohio State^{†}	Iowa Stadium; Iowa City, IA	W 8–0	45,000	
November 1	at Minnesota	Memorial Stadium; Minneapolis, MN (rivalry)	L 7–17	60,376	
November 8	Illinois	Iowa Stadium; Iowa City, IA	L 13–33	44,855	
November 15	at Northwestern	Dyche Stadium; Evanston, IL	W 39–14	40,000	
November 22	No. 9 Notre Dame*	Iowa Stadium; Iowa City, IA	L 0–27	46,600	
*Non-conference game; ^{†}Homecoming; Rankings from AP Poll released prior to the game

== Game summaries ==
=== Illinois ===
Following the loss to Illinois, which was full of penalties and a couple of ejections for fighting, Iowa students began to throw fruit, cans, and bottles at the officials and Illinois' team as they left the field. One Iowa student was also punched by an Illinois player in the melee. Iowa and Illinois were not scheduled to play in 1953 and 1954, but their athletic directors decided to expand that timeline to 1958 in order to allow for a "cooling-off" period. That time frame was eventually extended until 1967, which created a 14-season gap in the series between the conference schools.

== Players ==
The following players won varsity letters for their performance on the 1952 Iowa football team:

- Bernie Bennett, fullback/defensive back
- Charles Boothe, guard
- Burt Britzmann, quarterback
- George Broeder, fullback/defensive back
- Don Chelf, tackle
- Jerry Clark, guard
- Cameron Cummins, tackle
- Chuck Daniels, halfback
- Tom Ellis, guard
- Bill Fenton, end, captain, and MVP
- Richard Frymire, tackle
- John Hall, guard/end/linebacker
- James Hatch, halfback
- Phil Hayman, guard
- Jack Hess, quarterback
- Jerry Hilgenberg, center/linebacker
- Andrew Houg, guard
- Roy Hutchinson, tackle
- Don Inman, halfback/linebacker
- Paul Kemp, quarterback
- Bud Lawson, center
- Lyle Leinbaugh, halfback
- Ed Lindsey, end
- Louis Matykiewicz, quarterback/linebacker
- Dan McBride, end
- James Milani
- George Palmer, tackle
- Robert A. Phillips
- Harold Reister, halfback/safety
- George "Dusty" Rice, halfback/safety
- Emmett Sawyer, guard/tackle
- Peter Spanjers, guard
- Bob Stearnes, halfback
