= Richard O'Shaughnessy =

Richard O'Shaughnessy may refer to:

- Dick O'Shaughnessy (born 1930s), American football player, wrestler and coach
- Richard O'Shaughnessy (MP) (1842–1918), Irish Home Rule League politician
