= Gedman =

Gedman is a surname. Notable people with the surname include:

- Gene Gedman (1932–1974), American football player
- Marissa Gedman, American ice hockey player
- Rich Gedman (born 1959), American baseball player
