= Merritt Green =

American football player, lawyer, and judge

- Green in 1953 with Fritz Crisler and Bennie Oosterbaan

No. 84
- Position: Defensive end

Personal information
- Born: December 30, 1930; Galesburg, Illinois, U.S.
- Died: May 7, 2016 (aged 85); Traverse City, Michigan, U.S.
- Listed height: 6 ft 0 in (1.83 m)
- Listed weight: 180 lb (82 kg)

Career information
- High school: DeVilbiss (Toledo, OH)
- College: University of Michigan (1950–1952)

Merritt William "Tim" Green II (December 30, 1930 – May 7, 2016) was an American football player, lawyer, and judge.

Green played college football for the University of Michigan Wolverines football team from 1950 to 1952 and was the captain of the 1951 team. He also won the Meyer Morton Award in 1951.

Green later became a lawyer, practicing in Ohio and Michigan, and representing labor unions and civil rights groups.

== Early life ==
Green was born on December 30, 1930, in Ohio. He grew up in Toledo, Ohio, where his father Merritt W. Green, Sr., was a lawyer in the city law department and later in private practice. Both of his parents were Ohio natives, and he had a younger brother, Dennis. Green attended DeVilbiss High School in Toledo. He played at the halfback position for the DeVilbiss football team.

== University of Michigan ==
Green enrolled in the University of Michigan in 1949 and played for the freshman football team that fall. He played for the Michigan Wolverines football team as a defensive end under head coach Bennie Oosterbaan from 1950 to 1952. In a non-conference loss against Cornell on November 10, 1951, Green was credited with "outstanding defensive play" as he "recovered one fumble, intercepted a pass and got almost half the Wolverines' tackles, it appeared." His speed also made him a valuable player on kickoff and punt plays. Coach Oosterbaan praised Green for his "good hands and great spirit." On November 27, 1951, at the end of his junior season, Green's teammates voted him as the captain of the 1952 Michigan Wolverines football team.

As captain, Green started all nine games at left end and led the 1952 Michigan team to a 5–4 record. He suffered an ankle injury before Big Ten season opener, but was able to "hobble through" the Indiana game. He also blocked a punt the following week against Northwestern.

== Family and later years ==
After graduating from Michigan, Green returned to Toledo. He was married in approximately 1950 to Anna M. Green; they were divorced in January 1968. He later married to a second wife, Marilyn and a third wife, Patti. He had two sons and two daughters with his first wife, Anna.

Merritt returned to the University of Michigan in the late 1950s and received his law degree in 1960. He became a prominent trial lawyer in Ohio and Michigan. He represented labor unions and civil rights groups and founded the firm of Green & Lackey. He later practiced in the field of maritime law and represented families of several crew members from the SS Edmund Fitzgerald. He also served two terms as a judge in Lucas County, Ohio. He moved from Toledo to Traverse City, Michigan, in approximately 1990. He died in Traverse City in May 2016.
