= Rudy Bukich =

American football player (1930–2016)

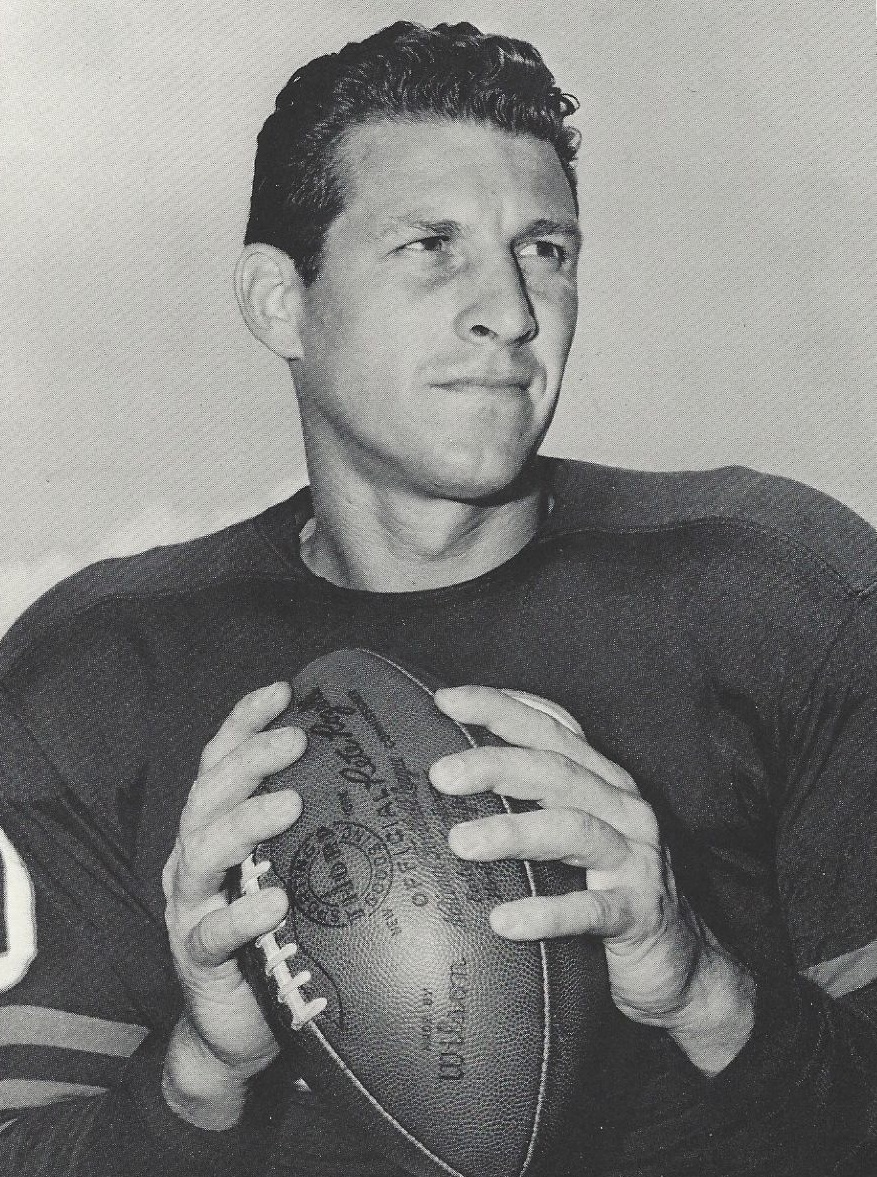
- Bukich with the Chicago Bears in 1967

No. 10, 14
- Position: Quarterback

Personal information
- Born: September 15, 1930; St. Louis, Missouri, U.S.
- Died: February 29, 2016 (aged 85); San Diego, California, U.S.
- Listed height: 6 ft 1 in (1.85 m)
- Listed weight: 195 lb (88 kg)

Career information
- High school: Roosevelt (St. Louis)
- College: Iowa (1949); USC (1950-1952)
- NFL draft: 1953: 2nd round, 25th overall pick

Career history
- Los Angeles Rams (1953, 1956); Washington Redskins (1957–1958); Chicago Bears (1958-1959); Pittsburgh Steelers (1960–1961); Chicago Bears (1962–1968)

Awards and highlights
- NFL champion (1963); NFL completion percentage leader (1964)

Career NFL statistics
- Passing attempts: 1,190
- Passing completions: 626
- Completion percentage: 52.6%
- TD–INT: 61–74
- Passing yards: 8,433
- Passer rating: 66.6
- Stats at Pro Football Reference

Other information
- Military career
- Allegiance: United States
- Branch: U.S. Army
- Service years: 1954–1956
- Conflicts: Cold War

Rudolph Andrew Bukich (September 15, 1930 – February 29, 2016) was an American professional football player, a quarterback in the National Football League (NFL) from 1953 to 1968. Known as "Rudy the Rifle" for his uncommon arm strength, he tied an NFL record with 13 consecutive pass completions in the 1964 season. One year later, he was the second-leading passer in the league. He played college football at the University of Southern California, after transferring from the University of Iowa.

== Early life ==
Born and raised in St. Louis, Missouri, Bukich was the son of Croatian immigrants. He was starting quarterback in his senior year at Roosevelt High School, a team that did not win a game. Bukich played one game as wingback when Roosevelt tried to upset eventual league champions Cleveland High School by attempting to surprise them by playing the single wing.

== College career ==
As a freshman, Bukich played at the University of Iowa before transferring to the University of Southern California in Los Angeles. During his senior year in 1952, USC played in the Rose Bowl on New Year's Day. After the Trojans' primary passer, All-American halfback Jim Sears, was sidelined early in the first quarter with a broken leg, Bukich came in and conducted a drive, completing all but two of his passes, that resulted in the only score of the game, and USC defeated Wisconsin, 7–0. Bukich was selected as the Most Valuable Player in the game, and after his career, he was inducted into the USC Trojan Hall of Fame and the Rose Bowl Hall of Fame (2004).

== Professional career ==
Bukich was selected 25th overall in the second round of the 1953 NFL draft by the Los Angeles Rams. He later played for the Washington Redskins, Chicago Bears, and the Pittsburgh Steelers. He missed the 1954 and 1955 seasons while serving in the U.S. Army.

Bukich's greatest performances were during his second stint with the Bears in the 1960s. He was a reserve quarterback with the Bears in 1963 when they won the NFL championship (Bill Wade was the starter throughout the season). Bukich replaced Wade during Week Four against the Baltimore Colts after Wade completed just 5 of 21 passes. Bukich played the remainder of the game and completed 6 of 7 passes, including a pass to Ronnie Bull for a touchdown that was the deciding margin of victory.

== Post-playing career ==
After his playing days Bukich was a real estate developer in southern California. In his later years he was diagnosed with chronic traumatic encephalopathy (CTE), and he died at age 85 in San Diego in 2016. He is interred at Miramar National Cemetery in San Diego.
