= 1952 Northwestern Wildcats football team =

American college football season

1952 Northwestern Wildcats football
- Conference: Big Ten Conference
- Record: 2–6–1 (2–5 Big Ten)
- Head coach: Bob Voigts (6th season)
- MVP: Chuck Ilren
- Captain: Tom Roche
- Home stadium: Dyche Stadium

1952 Big Ten Conference football standings
	Conf.					Overall
Team	W		L		T	W		L		T
No. 11 Wisconsin +	4	–	1	–	1	6	–	3	–	1
No. 18 Purdue +	4	–	1	–	1	4	–	3	–	2
No. 17 Ohio State	5	–	2	–	0	6	–	3	–	0
Michigan	4	–	2	–	0	5	–	4	–	0
Minnesota	3	–	1	–	2	4	–	3	–	2
Illinois	2	–	5	–	0	4	–	5	–	0
Northwestern	2	–	5	–	0	2	–	6	–	1
Iowa	2	–	5	–	0	2	–	7	–	0
Indiana	1	–	5	–	0	2	–	7	–	0
+ – Conference co-champions; Rankings from AP Poll

The 1952 Northwestern Wildcats team represented Northwestern University during the 1952 Big Ten Conference football season. In their sixth year under head coach Bob Voigts, the Wildcats compiled a 2–6–1 record (2–5 against Big Ten Conference opponents), finished in seventh place in the Big Ten, and were outscored by their opponents by a combined total of 252 to 166.

== Schedule ==
Date	Opponent	Site	Result	Attendance	Source
September 26	at No. 16 USC*	Los Angeles Memorial Coliseum; Los Angeles, CA	L 0–31	59,756	
October 4	Vanderbilt*	Dyche Stadium; Evanston, IL	T 20–20	35,000	
October 11	at Minnesota	Memorial Stadium; Minneapolis, MN	L 26–27	46,732	
October 18	Michigan	Dyche Stadium; Evanston, IL (rivalry)	L 14–48	40,000	
October 25	Indiana	Dyche Stadium; Evanston, IL	W 23–13	30,000	
November 1	Ohio State	Dyche Stadium; Evanston, IL	L 21–24	35,000	
November 8	at No. 18 Wisconsin	Camp Randall Stadium; Madison, WI	L 20–24	52,131	
November 15	Iowa	Dyche Stadium; Evanston, IL	L 14–39	40,000	
November 22	at Illinois	Memorial Stadium; Champaign, IL (rivalry)	W 28–26	41,214	
*Non-conference game; Rankings from AP Poll released prior to the game
