= 1952 Ohio State Buckeyes football team =

American college football season

1952 Ohio State Buckeyes football
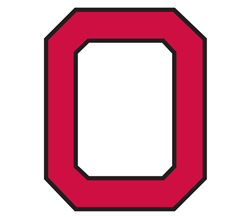
- Conference: Big Ten Conference

Ranking
- Coaches: No. 15
- AP: No. 17
- Record: 6–3 (5–2 Big Ten)
- Head coach: Woody Hayes (2nd season)
- MVP: Fred Bruney
- Captain: Bernie Skvarka
- Home stadium: Ohio Stadium

1952 Big Ten Conference football standings
	Conf.					Overall
Team	W		L		T	W		L		T
No. 11 Wisconsin +	4	–	1	–	1	6	–	3	–	1
No. 18 Purdue +	4	–	1	–	1	4	–	3	–	2
No. 17 Ohio State	5	–	2	–	0	6	–	3	–	0
Michigan	4	–	2	–	0	5	–	4	–	0
Minnesota	3	–	1	–	2	4	–	3	–	2
Illinois	2	–	5	–	0	4	–	5	–	0
Northwestern	2	–	5	–	0	2	–	6	–	1
Iowa	2	–	5	–	0	2	–	7	–	0
Indiana	1	–	5	–	0	2	–	7	–	0
+ – Conference co-champions; Rankings from AP Poll

The 1952 Ohio State Buckeyes football team represented the Ohio State University in the 1952 Big Ten Conference football season. The Buckeyes compiled a 6–3 record.

== Schedule ==
Date	Opponent	Rank	Site	Result	Attendance	Source
September 27	Indiana	No. 20	Ohio Stadium; Columbus, OH	W 33–13	70,208	
October 4	Purdue	No. 15	Ohio Stadium; Columbus, OH	L 14–21	75,417	
October 11	Wisconsin		Ohio Stadium; Columbus, OH	W 23–14	80,345	
October 18	Washington State*		Ohio Stadium; Columbus, OH	W 35–7	71,280	
October 25	at Iowa	No. 14	Iowa Stadium; Iowa City, IA	L 0–8	45,000	
November 1	at Northwestern		Dyche Stadium; Evanston, IL	W 24–21	35,000	
November 8	Pittsburgh*		Ohio Stadium; Columbus, OH	L 14–21	75,120	
November 15	at Illinois		Memorial Stadium; Champaign, IL (Illibuck)	W 27–7	60,077	
November 22	No. 12 Michigan		Ohio Stadium; Columbus, OH (rivalry)	W 27–7	81,541	
*Non-conference game; Rankings from AP Poll released prior to the game

== Coaching staff ==
- Woody Hayes, head coach, second year

== 1953 NFL draftees ==
Player	Round	Pick	Position	NFL club
Fred Bruney	3	35	Defensive back	Cleveland Browns
Tony Curcillo	6	63	Defensive back	Chicago Cardinals
Jim Ruehl	11	130	Center	New York Giants
Dick Hilinski	11	131	Tackle	Cleveland Browns
John Hlay	16	187	Back	Green Bay Packers
