= Jim Haluska =

American football player (1932–2012)

No. 11
- Position: Quarterback

Personal information
- Born: October 9, 1932; Racine, Wisconsin, U.S.
- Died: September 20, 2012 (aged 79); Milwaukee, Wisconsin, U.S.
- Listed height: 6 ft 0 in (1.83 m)
- Listed weight: 190 lb (86 kg)

Career information
- High school: St. Catherine's (Racine)
- College: Wisconsin
- NFL draft: 1954: 30th round, 354th overall pick

Career history
- Chicago Bears (1956)

Career NFL statistics
- Passing yards: 8
- TD–INT: 0-0
- Passer rating: 39.6
- Stats at Pro Football Reference

James David Haluska (October 9, 1932 – September 20, 2012) was an American professional football player who was a quarterback for the Chicago Bears of the National Football League (NFL). Selected in the 30th and final round (354th overall pick) of the 1954 NFL draft, he played in five games in the 1956 season, where he completed one of four passes for a total of eight yards. He played college football for the Wisconsin Badgers.

== Early life ==
Nicknamed "Bombo" in his youth, Haluska attended St. Catherine's High School in Racine, Wisconsin, where he was named all-conference in football and basketball before graduating in 1950. He began his collegiate career at the University of Michigan, later transferring to the University of Wisconsin. With fellow Kenosha, Wisconsin native and future Heisman Trophy winner Alan Ameche in his backfield, Haluska led the 1952 Wisconsin Badgers football team to a Big Ten Conference title and a spot in the 1953 Rose Bowl, which the Badgers lost to the USC, 7–0. Haluska set Wisconsin school records in the 1952 season for yards passing (1,552) and touchdowns (12).

Haluska represented Wisconsin in the 1955 Blue–Gray Football Classic and 1956 Senior Bowl. He also played in the 1956 Chicago Tribune College All-Star Game.

== High school coaching career ==
As head coach at Don Bosco High School (later St. Thomas More High School) in Milwaukee, Haluska led the Cavaliers varsity football squad to its first Wisconsin Independent Schools Athletic Association (WISAA) state championship, defeating a team fielded by Fond du Lac St. Mary's Springs High School on November 13, 1976 at Titan Stadium in Oshkosh, Wisconsin. His high school teams won 12 conference championships and three WISAA state titles. He finished with a career record of 206-60-4 coaching at Milwaukee Don Bosco, Milwaukee Thomas More, Milwaukee Pius XI and Waukesha Catholic Memorial. His coaching legacy includes the "quick kick" on second down, "form tackling", the "sleeper "play", and the "double pass".

Haluska was inducted into the UW Athletic Department Hall of Fame in 2012 and was a 2001 inductee of the Wisconsin Football Coaches Association Hall of Fame.

== Awards and honors ==
- 1995 Don Bosco High School Hall of Fame
- 1998 St. Catherine's High School Athletic Hall of Fame
- 2001 WFCA Hall of Fame
- 2011 St. Thomas More High School Athletic Hall of Fame
- 2012 UW Athletic Department Hall of Fame
- 2015 St. Thomas More High School creates "Coach Jim Haluska Wall of Champions"
- 2021 Racine County Sports Hall of Fame
