= Dave Suminski =

American football player (1931–2005)

- Suminski in 1953

No. 67, 61, 64
- Positions: Guard, tackle

Personal information
- Born: June 18, 1931; Ashland, Wisconsin, U.S.
- Died: September 22, 2005 (aged 74); Ashland, Wisconsin, U.S.
- Listed height: 5 ft 11 in (1.80 m)
- Listed weight: 230 lb (104 kg)

Career information
- High school: Ashland
- College: Wisconsin
- NFL draft: 1953: 15th round, 171st overall pick

Career history
- Washington Redskins (1953); Chicago Cardinals (1953); Hamilton Tiger-Cats (1957–1960)

Awards and highlights
- Grey Cup champion (1957); 2× CFL East All-Star (1957, 1959); First-team All-American (1952); First-team All-Big Ten (1952)

Career NFL statistics
- Games played: 8
- Games Started: 8
- Stats at Pro Football Reference

David Mitchell Suminski (June 18, 1931 – September 22, 2005) was an American football guard and tackle. He played professional football for the Chicago Cardinals and the Washington Redskins during the 1953 season in the National Football League. He also played four seasons in the Canadian Football League (CFL) from 1957 to 1960 with the Hamilton Tiger-Cats where he was twice selected as an All-Star. He played college football at the University of Wisconsin where he was selected as the most valuable player on the 1952 Wisconsin Badgers football team that won the Big Ten Conference championship. Suminski was also selected as a first-team All-American in 1952.

== Biography ==
Dave Suminski was born in Ashland, Wisconsin and graduated from Ashland High School in 1949.

He served in the United States Army during the Korean War. He worked for the Ferry Morse Seed Company.

He died at a hospital in Ashland, Wisconsin.
