= Bernie Crimmins =

American football player and coach (1919–1993)

Biographical details
- Born: April 19, 1919; Louisville, Kentucky, U.S.
- Died: March 19, 1993 (aged 73)

Playing career
- 1939–1941: Notre Dame
- 1945: Green Bay Packers
- Positions: Guard, halfback, fullback

Coaching career (HC unless noted)
- 1946–1951: Notre Dame (assistant)
- 1952–1956: Indiana
- 1957–1958: Notre Dame (assistant)
- 1959–1964: Purdue (assistant)

Head coaching record
- Overall: 13–32

Accomplishments and honors

Awards
- First-team All-American (1941)

Bernard Anthony Crimmins (April 19, 1919 – March 19, 1993) was an American football player and coach. He played college football at the University of Notre Dame and was second-team All-America at guard on the 1941 United Press and International News Service All-American teams. Crimmins played professionally in the National Football League with the Green Bay Packers for one season in 1945. From 1952 to 1956, Crimmins served as the head football coach at Indiana University Bloomington, compiling a record of 13–32. He was also an assistant football coach at Notre Dame from 1946 to 1951 and from 1957 to 1958, and an assistant football coach at Purdue University from 1959 through 1964.

During World War II, Crimmins served in the United States Navy. On March 29, 1943, Crimmins was assigned to Squadron 21 and told to report to Commander Motor Torpedo Squadron Twenty-One, Navy Yard, New York for outfitting. He then served as a PT boat commander in the Pacific where he was awarded a Silver Star. At the time of the award he was a Lieutenant (junior grade). Crimmins also was awarded a Presidential Citation and three battle stars.

Crimmins was inducted into the Indiana Football Hall of Fame on August 1, 1975.

== Head coaching record ==
Year	Team	Overall	Conference	Standing	Bowl/playoffs
Indiana Hoosiers (Big Ten Conference) (1952–1956)
1952	Indiana	2–7	1–5	9th	
1953	Indiana	2–7	1–5	9th	
1954	Indiana	3–6	2–4	7th	
1955	Indiana	3–6	1–5	9th	
1956	Indiana	3–6	1–5	10th	
Indiana:		13–32	6–24		
Total:		13–32			
