= 1953 Rose Bowl =

American college football game

- 39th Rose Bowl Game
| Wisconsin Badgers | USC Trojans |
| (6–2–1) | (9–1) |
| 0 | 7 |
| Head coach: Ivy Williamson | Head coach: Jess Hill |
| AP / Coaches; 11 / 10 | AP / Coaches; 5 / 4 |
| | 1 | 2 | 3 | 4 | Total |
|---|---|---|---|---|---|
| Wisconsin | 0 | 0 | 0 | 0 | 0 |
| USC | 0 | 0 | 7 | 0 | 7 |
- Date: January 1, 1953
- Season: 1952
- Stadium: Rose Bowl
- Location: Pasadena, California
- MVP: Rudy Bukich (USC QB)
- Favorite: USC by 7 points
- Referee: Jack Sprenger (Pacific Coast; split crew: Pacific Coast, Big Ten)
- Attendance: 101,500

United States TV coverage
- Network: NBC
- Announcers: Al Helfer

The 1953 Rose Bowl was the 39th edition of the college football bowl game, played at the Rose Bowl in Pasadena, California, on Thursday, January 1, at the end of the 1952 college football season. The fifth-ranked USC Trojans of the Pacific Coast Conference defeated the #11 Wisconsin Badgers of the Big Ten Conference, 7–0.

It was Wisconsin's first bowl game and the first Rose Bowl appearance for the Trojans in five years. It is also the first meeting of the two football programs.

== Teams ==
=== Wisconsin Badgers ===
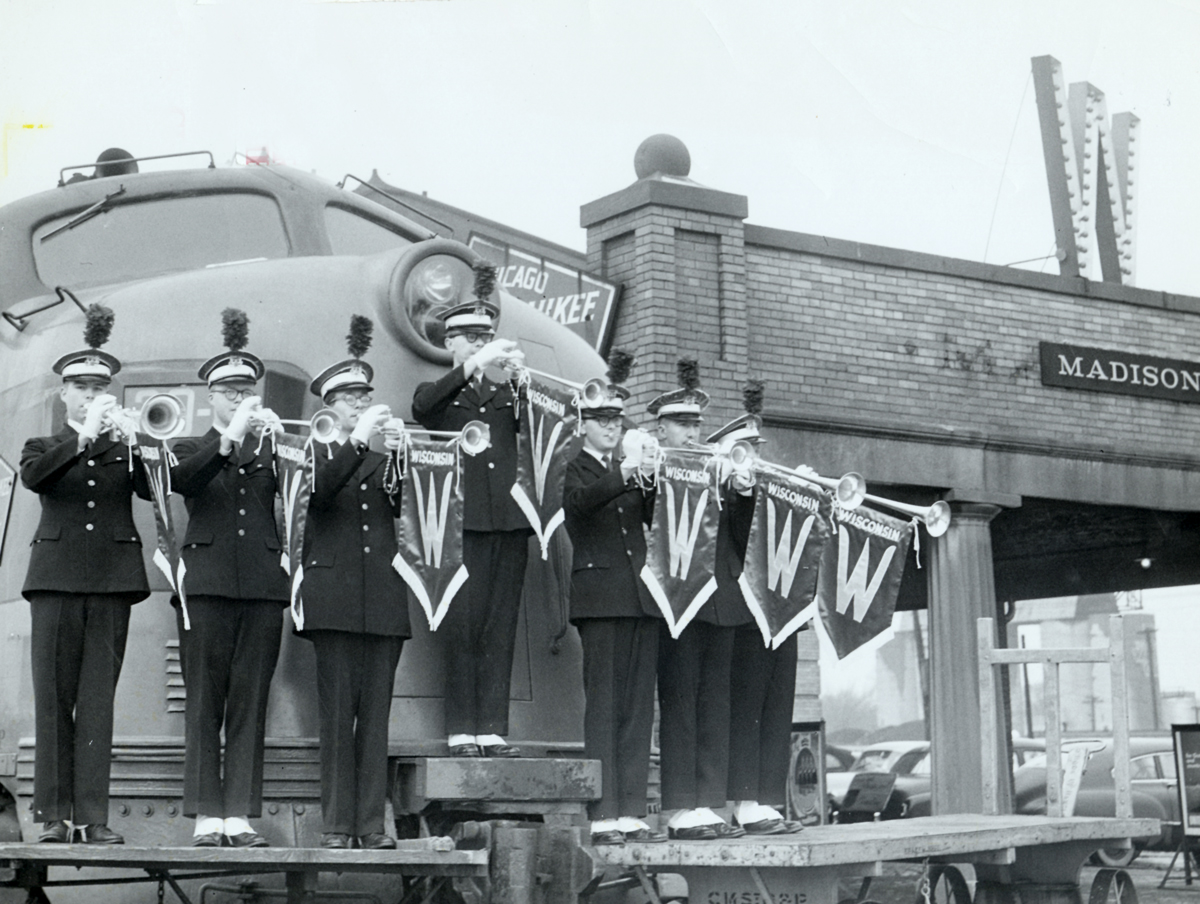
UW Marching Band heading to the Rose Bowl

Wisconsin was the co-champion of the Big Ten Conference with Purdue, whom they did not play, and entered the Rose Bowl with a 6–2–1 record (4–1–1 in conference). The Badgers' non-conference loss was to UCLA, the Big Ten loss was at Ohio State, and they tied Minnesota in their season-ending rivalry game. This was the program's first bowl game appearance.

=== USC Trojans ===
The USC Trojans entered the game as the Pacific Coast Conference champions, with a 6–0 record in conference play. Their sole loss was against Notre Dame in their season-ending rivalry game.

== Aftermath ==
This was the first win by a Pacific Coast team over a Big Ten team since the Rose Bowl began its exclusive contract to pair the champions of these two conferences in 1946 (beginning with the 1947 Rose Bowl). It was only the second time in Rose Bowl history that the PCC defeated the Big Ten, the first was 32 years earlier in January 1921, when California defeated Ohio State.

This game featured the fewest points scored in a Rose Bowl since the 0–0 tie in 1922. As of 2020, this game still stands as the second-fewest points ever scored in a Rose Bowl, and the fewest scored since the Rose Bowl started pairing the Big Ten and West (PCC/AAWU) champions for the game. The next time these two teams met in a Rose Bowl (1963), they combined to break the record for the most points ever scored in the game.

USC quarterback Rudy Bukich was named the Player of the Game. Future Heisman Trophy winner, Wisconsin running back/linebacker Alan Ameche, finished the game with 133 rushing yards on 28 carries. Bukich and Ameche have subsequently been inducted into the Rose Bowl Hall of Fame.
