= 1952 Minnesota Golden Gophers football team =

American college football season

1952 Minnesota Golden Gophers football
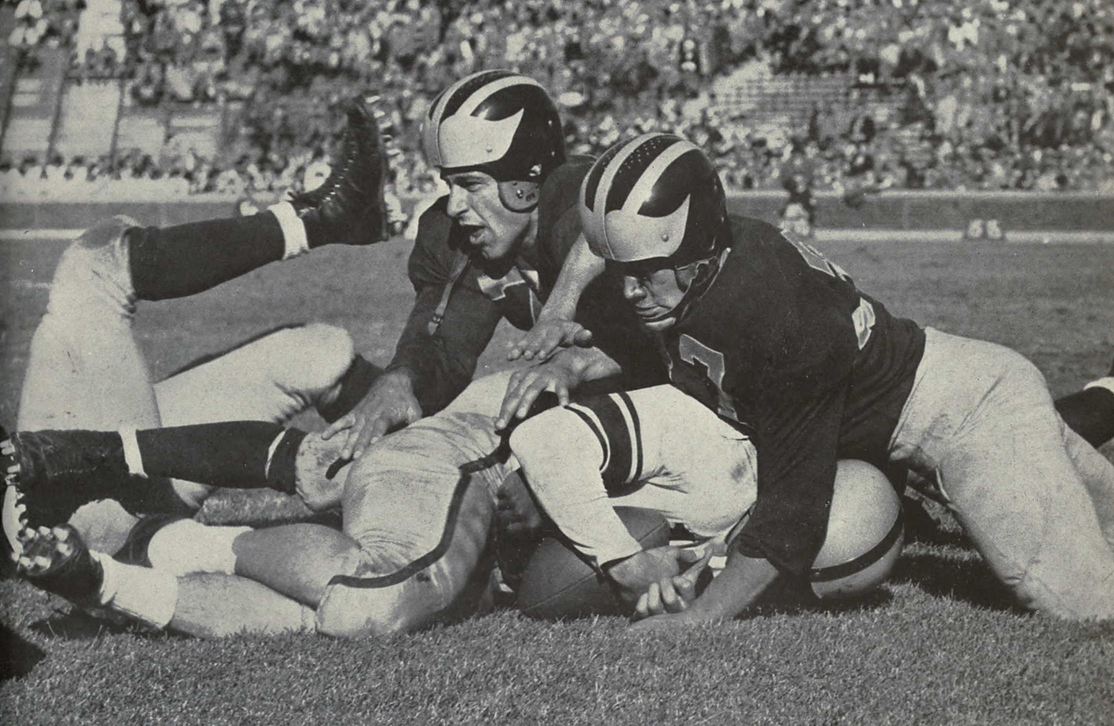
- Conference: Big Ten Conference
- Record: 4–3–2 (3–1–2 Big Ten)
- Head coach: Wes Fesler (2nd season)
- MVP: Paul Giel
- Captain: Richard Anderson
- Home stadium: Memorial Stadium

1952 Big Ten Conference football standings
	Conf.					Overall
Team	W		L		T	W		L		T
No. 11 Wisconsin +	4	–	1	–	1	6	–	3	–	1
No. 18 Purdue +	4	–	1	–	1	4	–	3	–	2
No. 17 Ohio State	5	–	2	–	0	6	–	3	–	0
Michigan	4	–	2	–	0	5	–	4	–	0
Minnesota	3	–	1	–	2	4	–	3	–	2
Illinois	2	–	5	–	0	4	–	5	–	0
Northwestern	2	–	5	–	0	2	–	6	–	1
Iowa	2	–	5	–	0	2	–	7	–	0
Indiana	1	–	5	–	0	2	–	7	–	0
+ – Conference co-champions; Rankings from AP Poll

The 1952 Minnesota Golden Gophers football team represented the University of Minnesota in the 1952 Big Ten Conference football season. In their second year under head coach Wes Fesler, the Golden Gophers compiled a 4–3–2 record and were outscored by their opponents by a combined total of 171 to 131.

Halfback Paul Giel was named an All-American by the Associated Press, FWAA and Look Magazine. Giel received Chicago Tribune Silver Football, awarded to the most valuable player of the Big Ten. Giel, running back Bob MacNamara and guard Percy Zachary were named All-Big Ten first team. Giel finished third in voting for the Heisman Trophy.

Paul Giel was awarded the Team MVP Award.

Total attendance for the season was 270,292, which averaged to 54,058. The season high for attendance was against rival Iowa.

== Schedule ==
Date	Opponent	Site	Result	Attendance	Source
September 27	at Washington*	Husky Stadium; Seattle, WA	L 13–19	49,000	
October 4	No. 4 California*	Memorial Stadium; Minneapolis, MN	L 13–49	55,204	
October 11	Northwestern	Memorial Stadium; Minneapolis, MN	W 27–26	46,732	
October 18	No. 17 Illinois	Memorial Stadium; Minneapolis, MN	W 13–7	54,787	
October 25	at No. 19 Michigan	Michigan Stadium; Ann Arbor, MI (Little Brown Jug)	L 0–21	70,858	
November 1	Iowa^{†}	Memorial Stadium; Minneapolis, MN (rivalry)	W 17–7	60,376	
November 8	No. 9 Purdue	Memorial Stadium; Minneapolis, MN	T 14–14	53,193	
November 15	at Nebraska*	Memorial Stadium; Lincoln, NE (rivalry)	W 13–7	40,000	
November 22	at No. 13 Wisconsin	Camp Randall Stadium; Madison, WI (rivalry)	T 21–21	52,131	
*Non-conference game; ^{†}Homecoming; Rankings from AP Poll released prior to the game
