= Walt Cudzik =

American football player (1932–2005)

No. 57, 54, 56, 53
- Positions: Center, linebacker

Personal information
- Born: February 21, 1932; Chicago, Illinois, U.S.
- Died: December 11, 2005 (aged 73); Gulf Shores, Alabama, U.S.
- Listed height: 6 ft 2 in (1.88 m)
- Listed weight: 231 lb (105 kg)

Career information
- High school: Harrison (Chicago)
- College: Purdue (1950–1953)
- NFL draft: 1954: 18th round, 212th overall pick

Career history
- Washington Redskins (1954); Boston Patriots (1960-1963); Buffalo Bills (1964)

Awards and highlights
- AFL champion (1964); First-team All-Big Ten (1952)

Career NFL/AFL statistics
- Games played: 71
- Games started: 71
- Stats at Pro Football Reference

Walter Jacob Cudzik (February 21, 1932 – December 11, 2005) was an American football center in the National Football League (NFL) for the Washington Redskins. He also played in the American Football League (AFL) for the Boston Patriots and the Buffalo Bills.

== College ==
Cudzik played college football at Purdue University.

== NFL ==
Cudzik was drafted in the eighteenth round of the 1954 NFL draft by the Washington Redskins, where he played up to 1959.

== AFL ==
Cudzik was taken by the Boston Patriots in their inaugural season of 1960, where he played up to 1963. In his final year (1964), Cudzik became a member of the Buffalo Bills as their starting center, replacing Al Bemiller, who was moved to right offensive guard to accommodate him. That year, the Bills scored 400 points (28.6 points/game), 1st among 8 teams in the AFL, and won the AFL championship under head coach Lou Saban. In 1965, Cudzick was replaced by Dave Behrman.
