= Ted Kress =

American football player and businessman (1931–2003)

Profile
- Position: Halfback

Personal information
- Born: March 26, 1931
- Died: February 15, 2003 (aged 71); Peoria, Illinois, U.S.

Career information
- College: Michigan
- NFL draft: 1954: 29th round, 344 (By the Washington Redskins)th overall pick

Career history
- 1951–1953: Michigan

Awards and highlights
- First-team All-Big Ten (1952)

Edward S. "Ted" Kress (March 26, 1931 – February 15, 2003) was an American football player and businessman. He was the starting left halfback for the University of Michigan in 1952 and 1953 and set a Big Ten Conference single-game rushing record with 218 yards in October 1952. He later founded the Kress Corporation, a manufacturer of heavy industrial hauling vehicles, in Brimfield, Illinois.

== University of Michigan ==
Kress played college football at the University of Michigan from 1951 to 1953. He was Michigan's starter at left halfback in all 18 games of the 1952 and 1953 football seasons. In his first Big Ten Conference game as a starter, he completed 11 of 14 passes for 180 yards in a 26–13 win over Indiana. In his second Big Ten game as a starter, Kress set a new Big Ten Conference single-game rushing record with 218 yards in 20 carries against Northwestern. He scored three touchdowns in the first half of the game and broke the prior record of 216 yards set in 1943 by Bill Daley. At the time, the Associated Press wrote: "Halfback, Ted Kress, flitting like a frightened phantom, darted to three touchdowns and a new Big Ten rushing record." In his first two Big Ten games, Kress accumulated 474 yards of total offense and averaged 8.94 yards per play.

Kress also rushed for 92 yards and passed for 58 yards against Illinois in early November 1952, making him the Big Ten offensive leader at that stage of the season.

Kress started all nine games at left halfback for the 1952 Michigan Wolverines football team. He finished the 1952 season with 627 rushing yards and 559 passing yards, leading the Wolverines in both categories.

Kress also started all nine games at the left halfback position for the 1953 Michigan Wolverines football team. During the 1953 season, Kress compiled 339 rushing yards, 238 passing yards, 203 yards on kickoff returns and 142 receiving yards. He was also selected as an All-Big Ten Conference player in 1953.

Kress earned a Bachelor of Science degree in production engineering from the University of Michigan in 1954.

== Washington Redskins ==
Kress was selected by the Washington Redskins in the 29th round (344th overall pick) in the 1954 NFL draft. In March 1954, Kress signed with the Redskins. During the Redskins' summer training camp at Occidental College in Southern California, Redskins' coach Curly Lambeau moved Kress to the safety position. Kress suffered a slight concussion during a practice session at the end of July 1954. Kress did not play in any regular season games for the Redskins.

== Business career ==
Kress was the son of Ralph H. Kress (July 10, 1904–June 28, 1995), who was known in mining and engineering circles as the "father of the off-highway truck."

In 1965, Ted Kress founded the Kress Corporation in Brimfield, Illinois. During his lifetime and thereafter, the company has been a manufacturer of specialized industrial equipment for transporting and handling steel, slag, coal and other heavy materials for the steel mills, for the mining industry, and also for earth moving. His father joined the company in 1969. The company's first product was a slag pot carrier that was used to pick up, transfer, pour and skull slag pots from blast furnaces. It later expanded into the manufacture of coal haulers and slab carriers used to pick up and carried 100 tons of steel slabs and coils.

== Family and death ==
Kress was married to Rita Kress. They had one son, Nathan Kress. During his lifetime, Ted was the president and CEO of Kress Corp., and Rita was the treasurer.

Kress died in February 2003 at the OSF Saint Francis Medical Center in Peoria, Illinois. Following his death, his wife Rita became president and CEO of Kress Corp.
