= Tony Curcillo =

American gridiron football player (1931–2020)

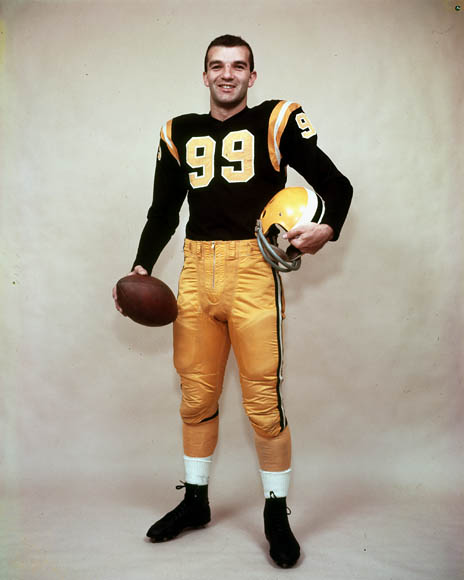

No. 39, 99, 12
- Positions: Defensive back, Halfback

Personal information
- Born: May 27, 1931; Long Branch, New Jersey, U.S.
- Died: December 8, 2020 (aged 89); Murrieta, California, U.S.
- Listed height: 6 ft 1 in (1.85 m)
- Listed weight: 200 lb (91 kg)

Career information
- High school: Elyria (Elyria, Ohio)
- College: Ohio State (1949–1952)
- NFL draft: 1953: 6th round, 64th overall pick

Career history
- Chicago Cardinals (1953); Hamilton Tiger-Cats (1956–1958, 1960)

Awards and highlights
- Grey Cup champion (1957); 2× CFL East All-Star (1957, 1958); First-team All-Big Ten (1952); Second-team All-Big Ten (1950)

Career NFL statistics
- Rushing yards: 29
- Rushing average: 3.6
- Interceptions: 2
- Fumble recoveries: 2
- Stats at Pro Football Reference

Anthony Curcillo Jr. (May 27, 1931 – December 8, 2020) was an American Grey Cup champion football player in the National Football League (NFL) and Canadian Football League (CFL).

== College years ==
Curcillo was the starting quarterback for the Ohio State Buckeyes football team in 1950 and 1951 and played linebacker, tailback, and center in 1952. Although recruited by Wes Fesler, he would become Woody Hayes' first starting quarterback at Ohio State when Hayes was hired in 1951. Curcillo's running back from during the 1950 and 1951 seasons was Vic Janowicz, the recipient of the 1950 Heisman Trophy and Curcillo's former teammate at Elyria High School.

== Professional career ==
Curcillo was drafted by the Chicago Cardinals in the sixth round of the 1953 NFL draft. He could not beat out fellow rookies Jim Root and Ray Nagel for playing time at quarterback, so Curcillo played the 1953 season at defensive back and halfback.

After graduating from Ohio State University with a bachelor in social administration in 1954, he became a second lieutenant and reported to Fort Sheridan, Illinois in June of that year. He was subsequently stationed at Fort Carson, where he played quarterback for the base football team in 1954 and 1955. On December 12, 1954, he played in the first Service Bowl against Hamilton Air Force Base. He was promoted to first lieutenant.

Curcillo rejoined the Cardinals in 1956, but did not receive any playing time behind Lamar McHan. Midway through the season he joined the Hamilton Tiger-Cats of the Interprovincial Rugby Football Union, a forerunner of the present day Canadian Football League. He replaced the controversial Ronnie Knox and on November 17, 1956, he passed for 518 yards in a playoff game against the Montreal Alouettes, still a CFL playoff record. When Bernie Faloney joined the Tiger-Cats in 1957, Curcillo became an all-star linebacker while also serving as the team's backup quarterback.

In 1973, he was inducted into the Elyria Sports Hall of Fame.

== Death ==
He died from complications of COVID-19 during the COVID-19 pandemic in California.
