= Ted Topor =

American football player (1930–2017)

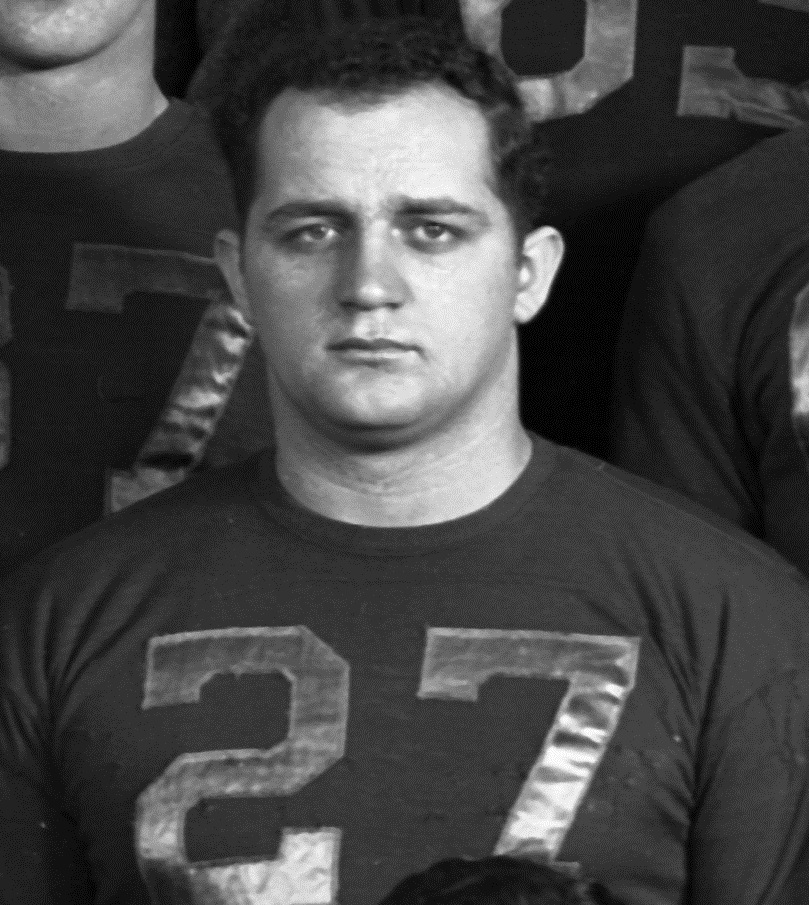

No. 54
- Position: Linebacker

Personal information
- Born: May 1, 1930; East Chicago, Indiana, U.S.
- Died: June 5, 2017 (aged 87); Highland, Indiana, U.S.
- Listed height: 6 ft 1 in (1.85 m)
- Listed weight: 210 lb (95 kg)

Career information
- College: Michigan
- NFL draft: 1953: 15th round, 182nd overall pick

Career history
- Detroit Lions (1955)
- Stats at Pro Football Reference

Teddy Peter Topor (May 1, 1930 – June 5, 2017) was an American football player who played quarterback and linebacker. He played college football for the University of Michigan and professional football for the Detroit Lions.

== Early life ==
Topor was born in East Chicago, Indiana in 1930 and graduated from East Chicago Roosevelt High School in 1949. He played on two Indiana state championship teams and was an Honorable Mention All-American high school player in 1948.

== University of Michigan ==
Topor enrolled at the University of Michigan where he played football for the Michigan Wolverines football teams from 1950 to 1952. He played on the 1950 Michigan Wolverines football team that won the Big Ten Conference championship and defeated the University of California in the 1951 Rose Bowl. A two-way player, Topor started seven games at quarterback and eight games as linebacker for the 1951 Wolverines.

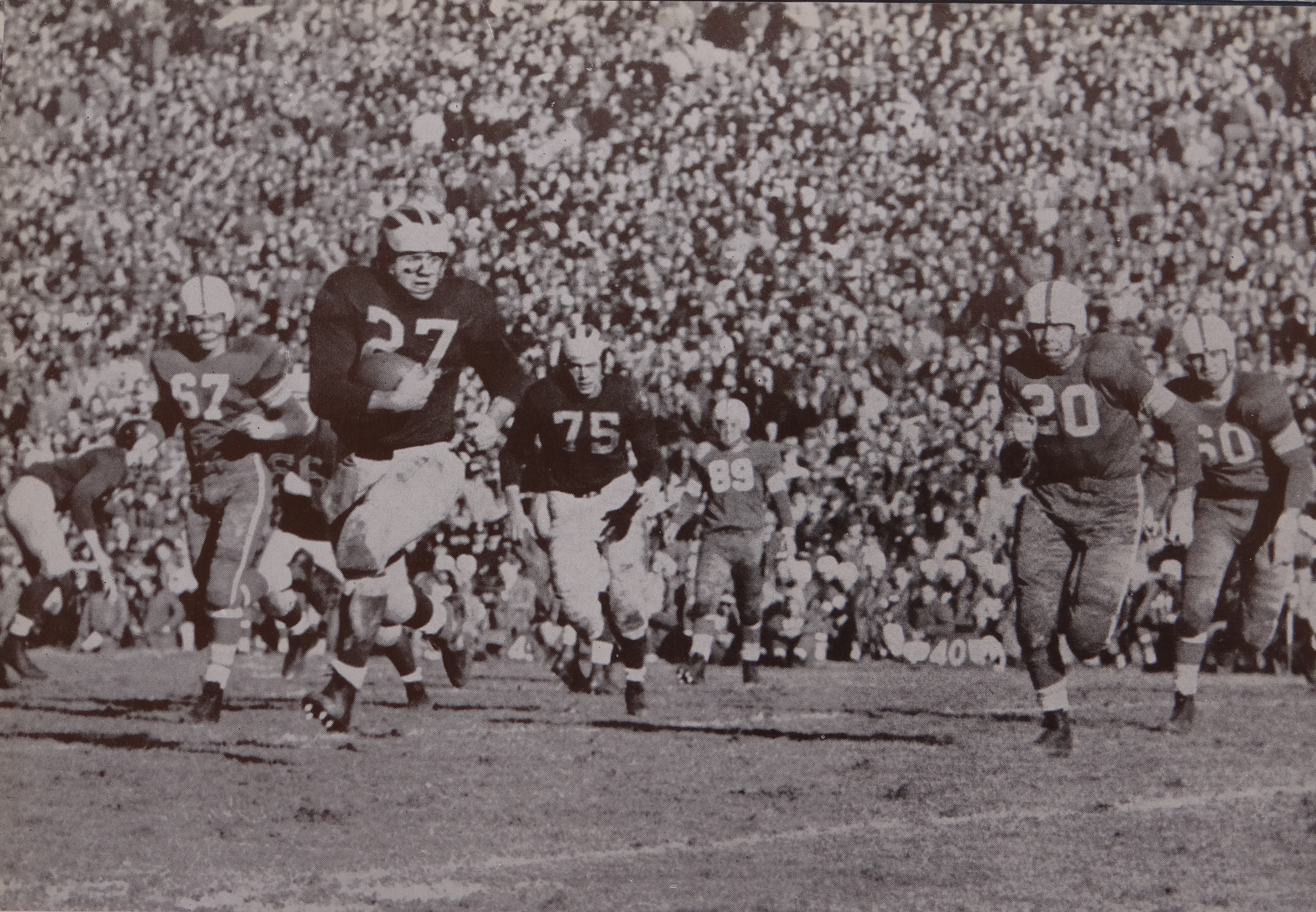
Topor (No. 27) with the football in 1951

In 1951, Topor also "became the center of a faculty dispute over whether Michigan employed double scholastic standards for athletes and nonathletes." Topor left the campus for a time, but he returned in 1952. Head coach Bennie Oosterbaan reported that Topor had both improved his school work and "emerged as a man." In September 1952, a feature story from the Associated Press reported that a fit and dedicated Topor had reinvigorated the Wolverines with a new spirit:

"Not the least of the factors in Michigan's dark horse role in the 1952 football campaign is an improved team spirit. And Coach Benny Oosterbaan and his staff attribute much of this to Ted Topor, the 212-pound senior quarterback from East Chicago, Ind."

Topor started all nine games at quarterback for the 1952 Wolverines and was selected as the team's Most Valuable Player.

== Detroit Lions ==
Topor was selected in the 15th round by the Detroit Lions in the 1953 NFL draft. Before starting his professional football career, he was inducted into the U.S. Army during the Korean War. Topor was one of 226 NFL personnel who served in the military during the Korean War. After serving two years in the military, Topor was discharged in September 1955 and played at the linebacker position for the Detroit Lions in the 1955 NFL season. However, his football career was cut short by injuries.

== Later life ==
After his playing career ended, Topor was the coach of the semi-pro Calumet Steelers for several years in the late 1950s and early 1960s.

Topor was inducted into the Indiana Football Hall of Fame in 2003.
