= Bernie Flowers =

American gridiron football player (1930–2011)

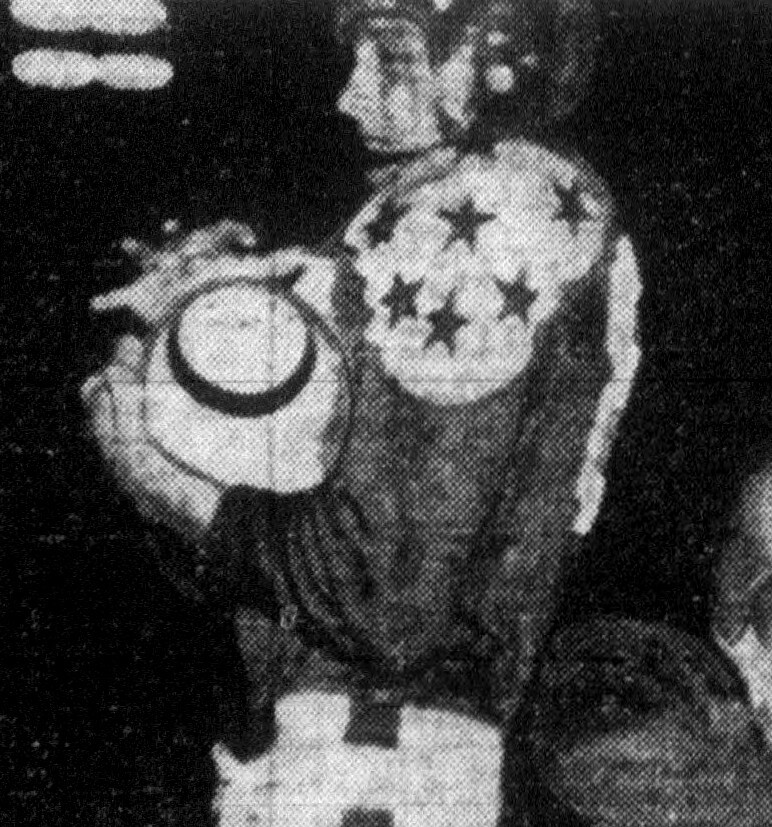
- Flowers in 1953

No. 77, 81
- Position: End

Personal information
- Born: February 14, 1930; Erie, Pennsylvania, U.S.
- Died: April 14, 2011 (aged 81); Lafayette, Indiana, U.S.
- Listed height: 6 ft 2 in (1.88 m)
- Listed weight: 190 lb (86 kg)

Career information
- High school: Central Tech (Erie)
- College: Purdue (1949–1952)
- NFL draft: 1953: 2nd round, 14th overall pick

Career history
- Ottawa Rough Riders (1953); Baltimore Colts (1956)

Awards and highlights
- CFL East All-Star (1953); Consensus All-American (1952); First-team All-Big Ten (1952)

Career NFL statistics
- Games played: 1
- Stats at Pro Football Reference

Benjamin Bernard Flowers (born Benjamin Bernard Kwiatkowski, February 14, 1930 – April 14, 2011) was an American professional football player who played at the end position for the Purdue University where he became a consensus first-team All-American in 1952.

Flowers was drafted by the Baltimore Colts in the second round (14th overall pick) of the 1953 NFL draft but chose to play in Canada with the Ottawa Rough Riders, where his 9 touchdowns scored made him an all-star. He played one game for the Colts in 1956.

== Early life ==
Born February 14, 1930, in Erie, Pennsylvania, Flowers was born Benjamin Bernard Kwiatkowski to a Polish family, and translated his last name to Flower ("kwiat" is Polish for flower). He attended Central Tech High School.

== College career ==
Flowers continued his football career at Purdue University following his graduation from Tech. Flowers lettered 3 years for the Boilermakers, from 1950 to 1952. In 1952, Flowers helped lead the Boilermakers to a share of the Big Ten Conference title, and was named a Consensus All-American.

== Professional career ==
=== Baltimore Colts ===
Flowers was drafted in the second round with the 14th overall selection in the 1953 NFL draft.

=== Ottawa Rough Riders ===
Flowers choose not to play with the Colts in 1953, opting to play for the Ottawa Rough Riders of the Canadian Football League instead. Flowers posted 9 receiving touchdowns, and was named an East All Star.

=== Return to Baltimore ===
After serving in the U.S. Navy from 1954 to 1955, Flowers returned to professional football, appearing in one game with the Colts during the 1956 season.

== See also ==
- 1952 College Football All-America Team
