= Dick O'Shaughnessy =

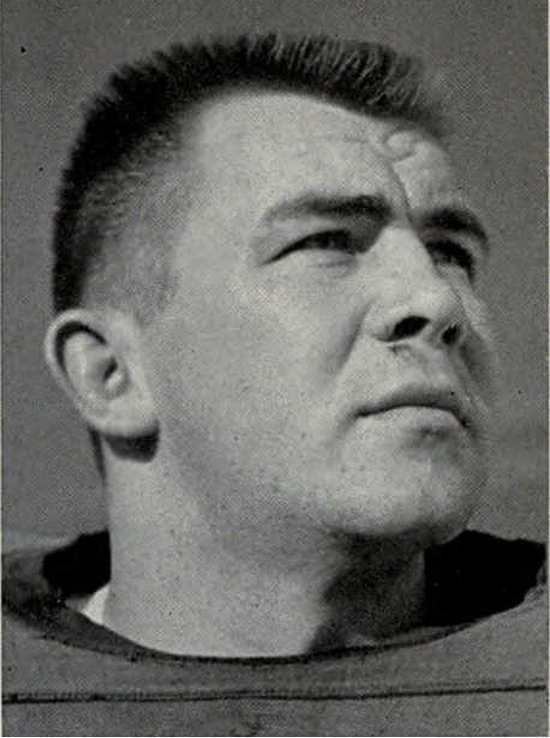
- O'Shaughnessy from the 1954 Michiganensian

Profile
- Position: Center

Personal information
- Born: c. 1931
- Died: 5 December 2020
- Listed height: 5 ft 11 in (1.80 m)
- Listed weight: 190 lb (86 kg)

Career information
- High school: The Hill School (Pottstown, PA)
- College: Michigan (1951–1955)

Awards and highlights
- First-team All-Big Ten (1952); Catholic All-America team (1953); Big Ten heavyweight wrestling champion (1952, 1953)

Richard E. O'Shaughnessy (c. 1931 – 5 December 2020) commonly known as Dick O'Shaughnessy, was an American football player and wrestler and coach. He attended the University of Michigan where he played from 1951 to 1953 and was captain of the 1953 Michigan Wolverines football team. He was selected as the center on the 1952 All-Big Ten Conference football team and on the 1952 and 1953 Catholic All-America teams. He also won the Big Ten Conference heavyweight wrestling championships in both 1952 and 1953.

After serving three years in the United States Air Force from 1956 to 1959, O'Shaughnessy spent 38 years as a football coach, teacher, and administrator at The Hill School in Pottstown, Pennsylvania.

== Early life ==
O'Shaughnessy was raised in Seaford, New York. After graduating from Mepham High school in Bellmore, L.I, he attended preparatory school at The Hill School in Pottstown, Pennsylvania, during the 1949–50 academic year. He was a member of the undefeated 1949 Hill School football team and won the National Prep school wrestling championship at 175 lbs in 1950.

== University of Michigan ==
At five feet, 11 inches, and 190 pounds, O'Shaughnessy enrolled at the University of Michigan in 1950 and played on the freshman football team that fall. As a sophomore and junior, O'Shaughnessy started all but five of 18 games, having been injured, at the center position for the 1951 and 1952 Michigan Wolverines football teams, playing 267 and 251 minutes respectively. At the end of the 1952 season, he was selected by the United Press as the center on the All-Big Ten football team.

In December 1952, he was unanimously elected as the captain of the 1953 Michigan team. As captain, O'Shaughnessy led the team to a 6–3 record and rankings of No. 19 in the final Coaches Poll and No. 20 in the final AP Poll. At the end of the 1953 season, he was selected for the second consecutive year as the center on the Catholic All-American team.

O'Shaughnessy also competed on the Michigan Wolverines wrestling team. As a freshman, he won the Michigan AAU championship. He then won the Big Ten Conference championship in the heavyweight division as a sophomore in 1952 and again as a junior in 1953. However, a leg injury forced him to withdraw from competition halfway through his senior season in 1954. He compiled a 28–4–2 record as a collegiate wrestler.

== Coaching career and family ==
In 1954, O'Shaughnessy joined the United States Air Force. After being discharged from the Air Force in 1959, O'Shaughnessy began a career as a teacher and football coach at The Hill School. He began as the line coach in 1959 and became head coach in 1964. He remained the head football coach at The Hill School for 20 years through the 1983 season. He also taught science and served as the school's assistant director of athletics and physical education. He spent a total of 36 years teaching and coaching at The Hill School, and he was later inducted into The Hill School Hall of Fame Founders Hall.

O'Shaughnessy and his wife, Winifred, had seven children, born between 1955 and 1965: Timothy, Susan, Patrick, Ellen, Andrew, Mary and Ann.
