= Al Brosky =

American football player (1928–2010)

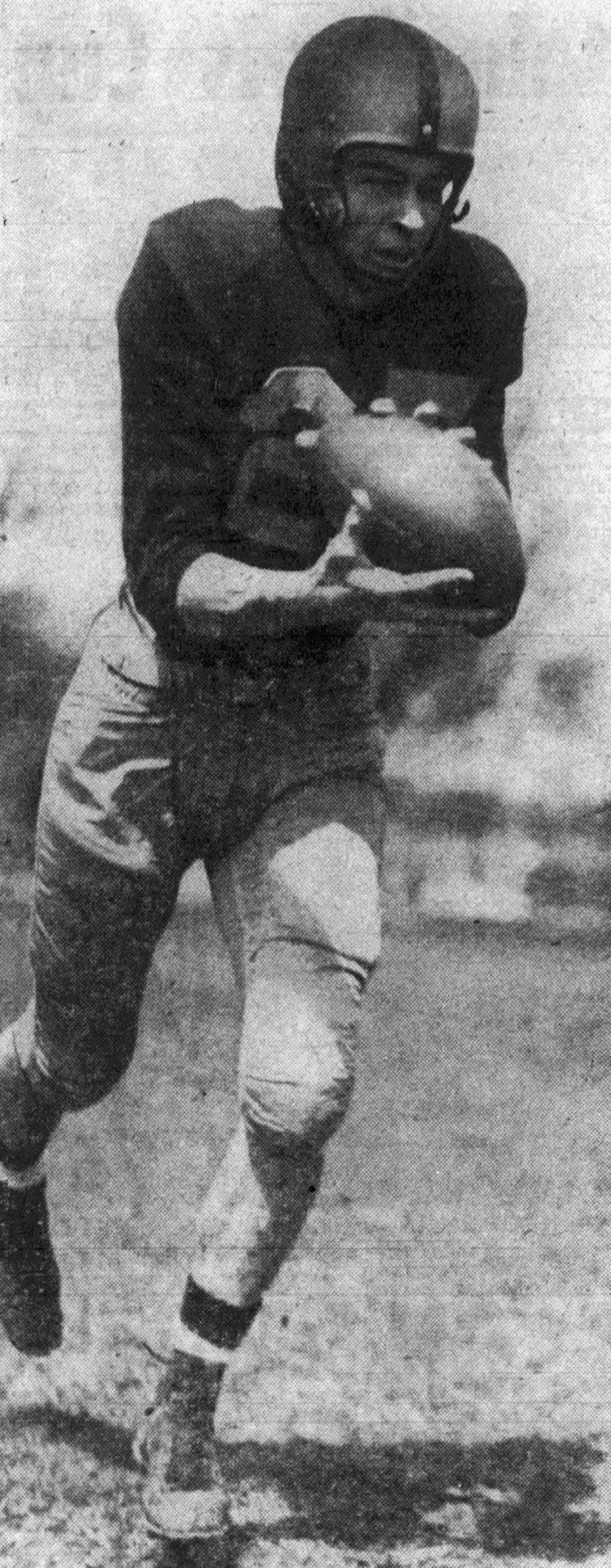
- Brosky, circa 1951

No. 24
- Position: Defensive back

Personal information
- Born: June 9, 1928; Cincinnati, Ohio, U.S.
- Died: November 28, 2010 (aged 82); Naperville, Illinois, U.S.
- Listed height: 5 ft 11 in (1.80 m)
- Listed weight: 175 lb (79 kg)

Career information
- High school: Harrison (Chicago, Illinois)
- College: Illinois
- NFL draft: 1951: 27th round, 324th overall pick

Career history
- Pittsburgh Steelers (1954)*; Chicago Cardinals (1954)
- * Offseason or practice squad member only

Awards and highlights
- First-team All-American (1951); 2× First-team All-Big Ten (1951, 1952); Second-team AP All-Time All-American (2025)

Career NFL statistics
- Interceptions: 2
- Stats at Pro Football Reference
- College Football Hall of Fame

Alfred E. Brosky (June 9, 1928 – November 28, 2010) was an American professional football player and a member of the College Football Hall of Fame.

Born in Cincinnati, Ohio, Brosky played football at the University of Illinois from 1950 to 1952. He was a member of the Theta Xi fraternity.

In 1950, he finished with 11 interceptions and followed that up with 11 interceptions again in 1951. In 1952, he finished with eight interceptions. Brosky set Big Ten Conference single-season football records in interceptions with 11 in 1950 and again in 1951.

As of 2024, Brosky holds the NCAA career records for interceptions with 29 (1950–1952), career interceptions per game at 1.1 (29 interceptions in 27 games), and most consecutive games with an interception at 15 (beginning November 11, 1950, vs. Iowa and ending October 18, 1952, vs. Minnesota).

After college, Brosky played professionally for one season, with the Chicago Cardinals in 1954. Brosky was inducted into the College Football Hall of Fame in 1998.
