= Tommy O'Connell =

American football player (1930–2014)

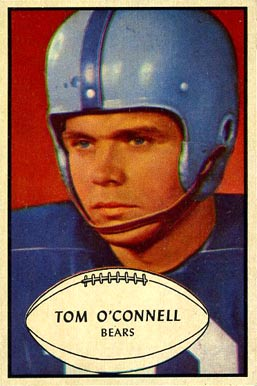
- O'Connell on a 1953 Bowman football card

No. 10, 15, 14
- Position: Quarterback

Personal information
- Born: September 26, 1930; Chicago, Illinois, U.S.
- Died: March 20, 2014 (aged 83) near Delray Beach, Florida, U.S.
- Listed height: 5 ft 11 in (1.80 m)
- Listed weight: 187 lb (85 kg)

Career information
- High school: South Shore (Chicago)
- College: Notre Dame (1949); Illinois (1950–1952)
- NFL draft: 1952: 18th round, 212th overall pick

Career history

Playing
- Chicago Bears (1953); Cleveland Browns (1956–1957); Buffalo Bills (1960–1961)

Coaching
- Drake (1959) Head coach; Buffalo Bills (1961) Assistant coach; Springfield Acorns (1964) Head coach

Awards and highlights
- Pro Bowl (1957); First-team All-Big Ten (1952)

Career NFL/AFL statistics
- Passing attempts: 423
- Passing completions: 204
- Completion percentage: 49.2%
- TD–INT: 21–34
- Passing yards: 3,261
- Passer rating: 57.5
- Rushing yards: 72
- Rushing touchdowns: 4
- Stats at Pro Football Reference

Thomas B. O'Connell (September 26, 1930 – March 20, 2014) was an American collegiate and professional football quarterback who played in the National Football League (NFL) for three seasons. He played in 1953 for the Chicago Bears and in 1956 and 1957 for the Cleveland Browns. O'Connell also played in two American Football League (AFL) seasons, 1960 and 1961, for the Buffalo Bills.

== Early life ==
Born in Chicago, O'Connell was a star athlete at South Shore High School area, playing for the city prep championship under former Illinois coach Clarence Applegran. He was recruited by Notre Dame but elected to play with his former prep teammates Rex Smith and Pete Bachouros at the University of Illinois Urbana-Champaign. He became eligible for varsity in 1951. He passed for 692 yards and six touchdowns that year as Illinois went 9–0–1 and won the Big Ten title to go along with the 1952 Rose Bowl (it is to date the last time the Illini have had a season with no losses). The team regressed the following year, but O'Connell set new marks for passing yards in a Big Ten game with 306 against Iowa and threw for 1,308 in the season to set a new conference record; the mark was a school record for 28 years while O'Connell's total passing yards for a career was a record for two decades.

== Professional career ==
O'Connell played backup duty in his rookie year of 1953, having 67 total passes that year in relief. He then underwent military service for the next two years. Midway through the 1956 season, he signed with the Cleveland Browns, who needed a backup quarterback for Babe Parilli after previous injury to George Ratterman. When Parilli separated his shoulder, O'Connell was tapped to start the last five games of the season. He threw four touchdowns to eight interceptions with 551 yards as the Browns went 3–2 to close the year.

In 1957, he was selected to the Pro Bowl and went 7–1–1 as a starter, which saw O'Connell and star rookie Jim Brown lead the Browns to the Eastern Conference title; O'Connell passed for 1,229 yards with 9 touchdowns to 8 interceptions. He was on pace to lead the league in passer rating, having gotten to 93.3 before suffering an injury (due to not meeting the minimum amount of pass attempts after throwing just 110, Johnny Unitas, who threw 301 in a season while having a 88.0 passer rating, finished in 1st). In the penultimate game of the year, he suffered an injury to his fibula that saw him have three hairline fractures in his leg that was initially stated to be an ankle sprain. However, he elected to play through the injury with Novocaine for the NFL Championship Game against the Detroit Lions. O'Connell went 4-of-8 for 61 yards with two interceptions before he was taken out for Milt Plum in the subsequent 59–14 loss.

He retired after the year only to return to football in 1960 with the American Football League. O'Connell was the first quarterback to start a game for the Bills in their history, doing so against the New York Titans on September 11. He went just 2-of-10 for 37 yards and one interception in the 27-3 loss. He played for the Buffalo Bills in 1960 and 1961 and started seven combined games (winning just once), throwing seven touchdowns to fourteen interceptions before retiring again. He served as an investor in Boston after retiring. He was to be the first offensive coordinator of the Cincinnati Bengals in 1968 but declined due to his business interests; Cincinnati hired Bill Walsh instead.

== Coaching career ==
O'Connell served 1958 on the staff of Illinois. The following year, he was hired the 18th head football coach at Drake University in Des Moines, Iowa and he held that position for the 1959 season. His coaching record at Drake was 2–7.

== Head coaching record ==
Year	Team	Overall	Conference	Standing	Bowl/playoffs
Drake Bulldogs (Independent) (1959)
1959	Drake	2–7			
Drake:		2–7			
Total:		2–7			

== Personal life ==
O’Connell mostly lived in Cohasset, Massachusetts in his later years with his wife, who he had five sons with. He became involved with establishing indoor ice rinks in the state, and two of his sons became involved in professional hockey with Mike and Tim. He died in Delray Beach, Florida on March 20, 2014.

== See also ==
- List of American Football League players
