= Roger Zatkoff =

American football player and businessman (1931–2021)

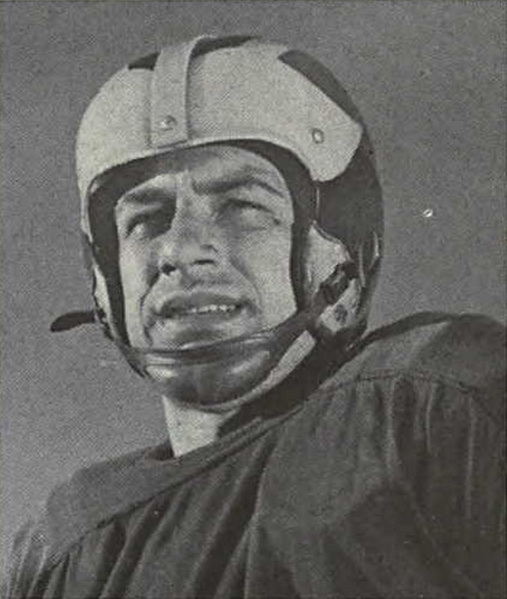
- Zatkoff in 1952

No. 74, 57
- Positions: Linebacker, defensive end

Personal information
- Born: March 25, 1931; Hamtramck, Michigan, U.S.
- Died: November 4, 2021 (aged 90); Clawson, Michigan, U.S.
- Listed height: 6 ft 2 in (1.88 m)
- Listed weight: 216 lb (98 kg)

Career information
- High school: Hamtramck
- College: Michigan (1949–1952)
- NFL draft: 1953: 5th round, 56th overall pick

Career history
- Green Bay Packers (1953–1956); Detroit Lions (1957–1958)

Awards and highlights
- NFL champion (1957); 2× First-team All-Pro (1954, 1955); 3× Pro Bowl (1954, 1955, 1956); 2× First-team All-Big Ten (1951, 1952)

Career NFL statistics
- Interceptions: 4
- Fumble recoveries: 8
- Stats at Pro Football Reference

Roger Zatkoff (March 25, 1931 – November 4, 2021) was an American professional football player and businessman.

A native of Hamtramck, Michigan, Zatkoff played college football for the Michigan Wolverines from 1950 to 1952 and was selected as a first-team all-conference player in the Big Ten in both 1951 and 1952. He later played professional football in the National Football League (NFL) for the Green Bay Packers from 1953 to 1956 and for the Detroit Lions in 1957 and 1958. He was selected as an All-Pro player in 1954 (UP first-team, AP second-team), 1955 (AP and TSN first-team), 1956 (NEA second-team). He was also a member of the 1957 Detroit Lions team that won the NFL championship.

After retiring from football, Zatkoff operated a manufacturing supply company based in the Detroit area. The company became the largest independent distributor of seals in North America.

== Early life ==
Zatkoff was born in Hamtramck, Michigan, in 1931. He played at the fullback position at Hamtramck High School.

== University of Michigan ==
Zatkoff enrolled at the University of Michigan in 1949 and played college football for Bennie Oosterbaan's Wolverines teams from 1950 to 1952. As a freshman, he was awarded the Meyer Morton Award as the freshman player showing the most promise. He started nine games at linebacker for the 1950 Wolverines squad that defeated Ohio State in the famous Snow Bowl game, won the Big ten championship, and defeated the University of California in the 1951 Rose Bowl. He started all nine games at linebacker for the 1951 Wolverines, and he was selected by the Associated Press as a first-team linebacker on the 1951 All-Big Ten Conference football team. As a senior in 1952, he started all nine games for Michigan at the linebacker position and was selected as a first-team All-Big Ten player by both the Associated Press and United Press.

Zatkoff was inducted into the University of Michigan Athletic Hall of Honor in 1985.

== Professional football ==
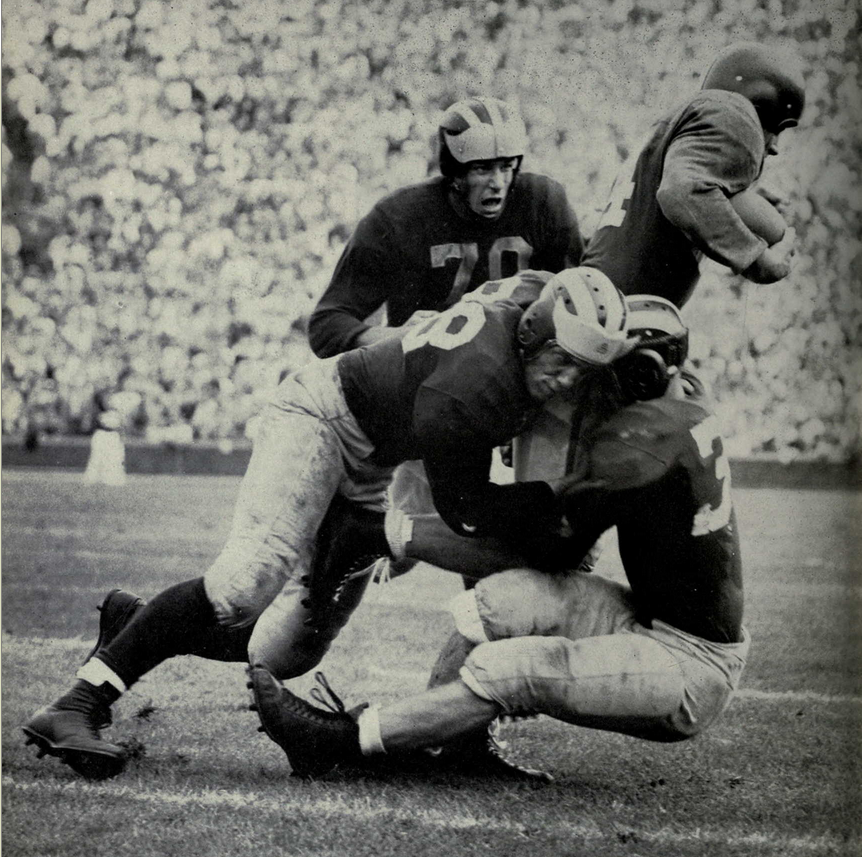
Zatkoff (No. 70) in 1950

Zatkoff was selected by the Green Bay Packers in the fifth round (56th overall pick) of the 1953 NFL draft. He played linebacker for the Packers and appeared in 48 games from 1953 to 1956. The Packers ranked in the NFL's lower tier while Zatkoff was with them, finishing 2–9–1 in 1953, 4–8 in 1954, 6–6 in 1955, and 4–8 in 1956. Despite the Packers' woes, Zatkoff earned a reputation as one of the best linebackers in the NFL in the mid-1950s and was selected as an All-Pro player in 1954 (UP first-team, AP second-team), 1955 (AP and TSN first-team), 1956 (NEA second-team).

In April 1957, the Packers traded Zatkoff and Bobby Garrett to the Cleveland Browns in exchange for six players, including Babe Parilli. Zatkoff announced that, for family and business reasons, he would retire rather than play for the Browns. The Browns tried to trade Zatkoff to the Los Angeles Rams, but Zatkoff refused to join the Rams, and the deal was called off. In September 1957, the Browns finally traded Zatkoff to the Detroit Lions, the team Zatkoff preferred, in exchange for Lew Carpenter, the Lions' leading rusher in 1954 and 1955, and a future draft pick.

He was a starting player on the 1957 Detroit Lions team that won the NFL championship. He also appeared in all 12 games for the Lions in 1958.

In March 1959, Zatkoff announced that he was retiring from football to focus on business.

== Later life ==
In 1959, Zatkoff formed a company known as Zatkoff Seals & Packings, a supplier to manufacturing companies in the Detroit and Toledo areas. The company grew to eight locations in three states and became "the largest independent distributor of seals in North America." Other companies include Zatkoff Properties, Ltd., and the Roger Zatkoff Company. Zatkoff is the great-uncle of National Hockey League goaltender Jeff Zatkoff of the Pittsburgh Penguins.

Zatkoff is one of at least 345 NFL players to be diagnosed after death with chronic traumatic encephalopathy (CTE), which is caused by repeated hits to the head.

== Roger Zatkoff Award ==
Since 1991, the University of Michigan has presented the Roger Zatkoff Award to the Michigan Wolverines football team's best linebacker at the end of each season. The past winners are listed below.

Year	Player	Year	Player	Year	Player
1991	Erick Anderson	2000	Victor Hobson	2009	Stevie Brown
1992	Steve Morrison	2001	Larry Foote	2010	Jonas Mouton
1993	Gannon Dudlar	2002	Victor Hobson	2011	Kenny Demens
1994	Steve Morrison	2003	Lawrence Reid	2012	Jake Ryan
1995	Jarrett Irons	2004	Roy Manning	2013	Jake Ryan
1996	Jarrett Irons	2005	David Harris	2014	Jake Ryan
1997	Sam Sword	2006	David Harris	2015	Desmond Morgan
1998	Sam Sword	2007	Chris Graham	2016	Ben Gedeon
1999	Ian Gold	2008	Obi Ezeh	2017	Devin Bush Jr.

== See also ==
- University of Michigan Athletic Hall of Honor
- List of NFL players with chronic traumatic encephalopathy
