= 1952 All-Big Ten Conference football team =

American college football all-star team

The 1952 All-Big Ten Conference football team consists of American football players selected to the All-Big Ten Conference teams selected by the Associated Press (AP) and United Press (UP) for the 1952 Big Ten Conference football season.

== Offensive selections ==
=== Ends ===
- Joe Collier, Northwestern (AP-1; UP-1)
- Bernard Flowers, Purdue (AP-1; UP-1)

=== Tackles ===
- George Jacoby, Ohio State (AP-1)
- Dave Suminski, Wisconsin (AP-1)
- Ray Huizinga, Northwestern (UP-1)

=== Guards ===
- James Reichenbach, Ohio State (AP-1)
- Robert Timm, Michigan (AP-1)
- George O'Brien, Wisconsin (UP-1)

=== Centers ===
- Walt Cudzik, Purdue (AP-1)
- Dick O'Shaughnessy, Michigan (UP-1)

=== Backs ===
- Alan Ameche, Wisconsin (AP-1; UP-1)
- Paul Giel, Minnesota (AP-1; UP-1)
- Tommy O'Connell, Illinois (AP-1; UP-1 [quarterback])
- Gene Gedman, Indiana (AP-1)
- Ted Kress, Michigan (UP-1)

== Defensive selections ==
=== Ends ===
- Bill Fenton, Iowa (AP-1)
- Frank Wodziak, Illinois (AP-1)

=== Tackles ===
- Fred Preziosio, Purdue (AP-1)
- Art Walker, Michigan (AP-1)

=== Guards ===
- Bob Kennedy, Wisconsin (AP-1; UP-1)
- Percy Zachary, Minnesota (AP-1)

=== Linebackers ===
- Roger Zatkoff, Michigan (AP-1; UP-1 [tackle])
- Tony Curcillo, Ohio State (AP-1)

=== Backs ===
- Fred Bruney, Ohio State (AP-1)
- Bob McNamara, Minnesota (AP-1)

=== Safeties ===
- Al Brosky, Illinois (AP-1)

== Key ==
AP = Associated Press, "selected with the cooperation of conference coaches"

UP = United Press

Bold = Consensus first-team selection of the AP and UP

== See also ==
- 1952 College Football All-America Team
