= Gene Gedman =

American football player (1932–1974)

No. 26
- Position: Running back

Personal information
- Born: January 9, 1932; Duquesne, Pennsylvania, U.S.
- Died: August 19, 1974 (aged 42); Chicago, Illinois, U.S.
- Listed height: 5 ft 11 in (1.80 m)
- Listed weight: 195 lb (88 kg)

Career information
- High school: Duquesne
- College: Indiana (1949–1952)
- NFL draft: 1953: 2nd round, 25th overall pick

Career history

Playing
- Detroit Lions (1953, 1956–1958)

Coaching
- Indianapolis Warriors (1961)

Awards and highlights
- 2× NFL champion (1953, 1957); First-team All-Big Ten (1952)

Career NFL statistics
- Rushing yards: 1,221
- Rushing average: 3.2
- Receptions: 53
- Receiving yards: 504
- Total touchdowns: 21
- Stats at Pro Football Reference

Eugene William Gedman (January 9, 1932 – August 19, 1974) was an American professional football player, a running back for four seasons with the Detroit Lions of the National Football League (NFL), 1953 and 1956 through 1958. The Lions won league titles in 1953 and 1957. He served in the military during the 1954 and 1955 seasons.

== Biography ==
Born in Duquesne, Pennsylvania, a suburb southeast of Pittsburgh, Gedman graduated from Duquesne High School in 1949. He played college football at Indiana University in Bloomington, where he was the Hoosiers' captain and most valuable player (twice), and All-Big Ten. He played in the East–West Shrine Game and was selected by the Lions in the second round of the 1953 NFL draft, the fifteenth overall pick.

During his fifth training camp, Gedman was waived by the Lions in mid-September 1959. A few days later he was later withdrawn from waivers and put on the injured list, due to a knee injury from the previous season. In 1963, he won a $15,000 workmen's compensation settlement from the club.

== After football ==
In the early 1960s, Gedman coached in the United Football League, at Indianapolis and Grand Rapids, and was a pension administrator for the city of Detroit. He was later a sales manager for a fire extinguisher company in Chicago. Gedman died at home in 1974 of a heart attack at age 42.
