= NBC College Football Game of the Week =

Nationally televised broadcasts

The NBC College Football Game of the Week refers to nationally televised broadcasts of Saturday afternoon college football games in the 1950s and 1960s that were produced by NBC Sports, the sports division of the NBC television network in the United States. Bowl games were always exempt from the NCAA's television regulations, and the games' organizers were free to sign rights deals with any network. In NBC's case, the 1952 Rose Bowl at the end of that particular season was the first national telecast of a college bowl game.

== Background ==
NBC first televised college football on September 30, 1939. NBC broadcast the game between Waynesburg and Fordham on station W2XBS (which would eventually become NBC's flagship station, WNBC) with one camera and Bill Stern was the sole announcer. Estimates are that the broadcast reached approximately 1,000 television sets. Twelve years later, the first live regular season college football game to be broadcast coast-to-coast aired on NBC. The game in question, was Duke at the Pittsburgh on September 29, 1951.

Pretty soon on June 6, 1952, NBC Head of Sport Tom Gallery led negotiations towards a one-year football contract (for $1,144,000) with the National Collegiate Athletic Association (NCAA). The contract incidentally came about after the 1951 NCAA convention voted 161-7 to outlaw televised games except for those licensed by the NCAA staff. The deal allowed NBC to select one game a week to broadcast on Saturday afternoons, with the assurance that no other NCAA college football broadcast would appear on a competitive network. In the first college football game to be broadcast under this new NCAA television contract, on September 20, Kansas defeated TCU 13–0.

By 1953, the NCAA allowed NBC to add what it called "panorama" coverage of multiple regional broadcasts for certain weeks – shifting national viewers to the most interesting game during its telecast. After NBC lost its college football contract following the 1953 season, they carried Canadian football in 1954. NBC regained college football rights in 1955 and aired games through the 1959 season. NBC regained the NCAA contract for the 1964 and 1965 seasons.

Even after losing the rights to regular season college football in both 1959 and 1965, NBC continued to carry postseason football. NBC carried the Blue–Gray Football Classic, an all-star game, on Christmas Day, until dropping the game in 1963 as a protest of the game's policy of segregation. It consistently served as the Rose Bowl's television home until 1988 and added the Sugar Bowl from 1958 to 1969 (which replaced the network's coverage of the Cotton Bowl Classic).

== Commentators ==
=== Play-by-play ===
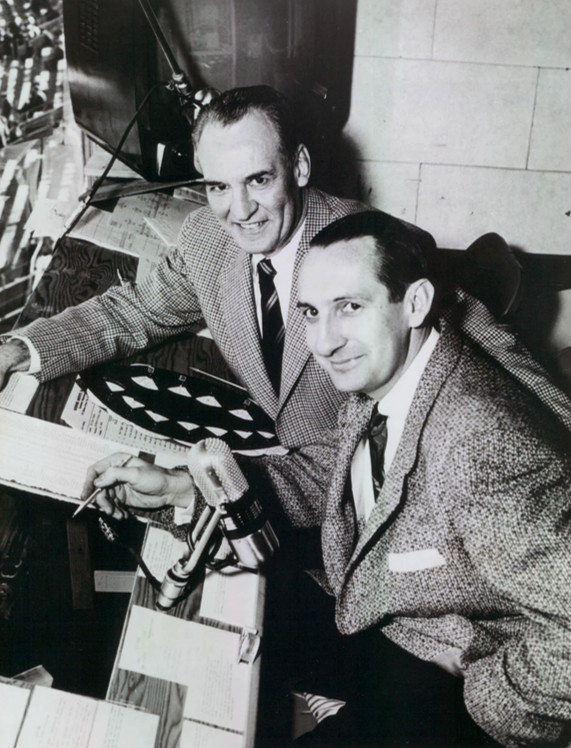
Red Grange (top) with broadcast partner Lindsey Nelson for NBC's NCAA Game of the Week coverage, 1955.

- Mel Allen (1952–58)
- Lee Giroux (1956)
- Chick Hearn (1957–58, 1965)
- Lindsey Nelson (1953, 1955–59, 1964–65)
- Jim Simpson (1957)

=== Color commentary ===
- Frankie Albert (1965; with Chick Hearn)
- Terry Brennan (1964–65; with Lindsey Nelson)
- Leo Durocher (1956; with Lee Giroux on west coast regional games)
- Bill Flemming (1957–58; with Mel Allen)
- Lee Giroux (1957–58; with Chick Hearn)
- Curt Gowdy (1958; with Mel Allen)
- Red Grange (1955–59; with Lindsey Nelson)
- Charley Harville (1957; with Jim Simpson on southeast games)
- Bill Henry (1952)
- Bill Munday (1953; with Lindsey Nelson)
- Lindsey Nelson (1953; with Mel Allen)
- Bill Voights (1956; with Mel Allen on midwest regional games)
- Bud Wilkinson (1964–65; with Lindsey Nelson)

== Schedules ==
All rankings are from that week's AP Poll

=== 1952 ===
Mel Allen and Bill Henry served as the primary broadcast crew.

Date	Teams	Time (ET)
September 20	#9 TCU at #17 Kansas	3:45 p.m.
September 27	#12 Princeton at Columbia	1:25 p.m.
October 4	Michigan at Stanford	4:40 p.m.
October 11	Texas A&M at #2 Michigan State	1:45 p.m.
October 18	Cornell at Yale	1:45 p.m.
October 25	Purdue at Illinois	2:15 p.m.
November 1	Ohio State at Northwestern	2:15 p.m.
November 8	#4 Oklahoma at #10 Notre Dame	2:15 p.m.
November 15	#12 Alabama at #2 Georgia Tech	2:15 p.m.
November 22	#4 UCLA at #3 USC	4:45 p.m.
November 29	Army vs. Navy at Philadelphia, PA	1:00 p.m.

=== 1953 ===
Mel Allen and Lindsey Nelson served as the primary broadcast crew.

Date	Teams	Time (ET)
September 19	Oregon at Nebraska	3:45 p.m.
September 26	Dartmouth vs. Holy Cross at Lynn, MA	1:45 p.m.
October 3	#6 Ohio State at California	4:45 p.m.
October 10	#16 Oklahoma vs. #15 Texas as Dallas, TX	2:30 p.m.
October 17	Tennessee at Alabama	2:45 p.m.
October 24	Cornell at Princeton; Arkansas vs. Ole Miss at Memphis, TN; Syracuse at #7 Illinois; Indiana at Iowa	2:45 p.m.
October 31	Pittsburgh at #14 Minnesota	2:45 p.m.
November 7	Georgia at Florida; Wisconsin at Northwestern; Kansas at Kansas State	2:45 p.m.
November 14	Michigan at #4 Michigan State	1:15 p.m.
November 21	#5 UCLA at #9 USC	4:15 p.m.
November 26	BYU at Utah	2:45 p.m.
November 28	#18 Army vs. Navy at Philadelphia, PA	1:15 p.m.
December 5	SMU at #2 Notre Dame	2:00 p.m.

=== 1955 ===
Lindsey Nelson and Red Grange served as the primary broadcast crew.

Date	Teams	Time (ET)
September 17	#9 Miami (FL) at #10 Georgia Tech	3:15 p.m.
September 24	#7 Pittsburgh at Syracuse	1:15 p.m.
October 1	#8 Ohio State at Stanford	4:45 p.m.
October 8	Villanova at Boston College	1:45 p.m.
October 15	#4 Notre Dame at #13 Michigan State	2:45 p.m.
October 22	Princeton at Cornell #14 Colorado at #3 Oklahoma	1:45 p.m.
October 29	Iowa at #3 Michigan	2:15 p.m.
November 5	#6 Notre Dame at Penn	1:15 p.m.
November 12	#13 Navy at Columbia	1:15 p.m.
November 19	#5 UCLA at USC	4:15 p.m.
November 24	Texas at #8 Texas A&M	2:00 p.m.
November 26	Army vs. #11 Navy at Philadelphia, PA	1:15 p.m.
December 3	North Carolina at Duke	1:45 p.m.

=== 1956 ===
Lindsey Nelson and Red Grange served as the primary broadcast crew.

Date	Teams	Time (ET)
September 22	#4 Georgia Tech at Kentucky	3:00 p.m.
September 29	Cornell at Colgate; UCLA at #13 Michigan; Iowa at Indiana	1:45 p.m.
October 6	Arkansas at #8 TCU	4:00 p.m.
October 13	Holy Cross at Penn State #5 Ohio State at Illinois; California at Oregon State	1:45 p.m.
October 20	Army at #13 Syracuse #2 Michigan State at Notre Dame; Washington at #9 USC	1:45 p.m.
October 27	#2 Oklahoma at Notre Dame	2:45 p.m.
November 3	Notre Dame vs. Navy at Baltimore, MD; Illinois at Purdue; Oregon at California	1:45 p.m.
November 10	#15 Iowa at #6 Minnesota	2:15 p.m.
November 17	#20 Princeton at Yale #3 Michigan State at #10 Michigan; Washington at Stanford	1:45 p.m.
November 22	Cornell at Penn	1:45 p.m.
November 24	USC at UCLA	4:15 p.m.
December 1	Army vs. #13 Navy at Philadelphia, PA	1:15 p.m.
December 8	#13 Pittsburgh at #6 Miami (FL)	2:15 p.m.

=== 1957 ===
Lindsey Nelson and Red Grange served as the primary broadcast crew. On October 12 and 26 and November 9, 23 and 28, NBC showed regional games with Mel Allen/Bill Flemming (midwest), Jim Simpson/Charley Harville (southeast), and Chick Hearn/Lee Giroux (west).

Date	Teams	Time (ET)
September 21	Maryland vs. #2 Texas A&M at Dallas, TX	4:45 p.m.
September 28	Northwestern at #16 Stanford	4:45 p.m.
October 5	#2 Michigan State at California	5:15 p.m.
October 12	#12 Notre Dame vs. #10 Army at Philadelphia, PA; Wake Forest at Maryland; Illinois at Ohio State; Iowa State at Kansas; Washington at UCLA	1:45 p.m.
October 19	#4 Minnesota at Illinois	2:15 p.m.
October 26	Penn State at Syracuse #4 Duke at #11 NC State #14 Minnesota at #20 Michigan; Washington State at USC	1:15 p.m.
November 2	#3 Iowa at #12 Michigan	1:15 p.m.
November 9	#16 Duke vs. #7 Navy at Baltimore, MD; North Carolina at South Carolina	1:45 p.m.
November 16	Notre Dame at #2 Oklahoma	2:45 p.m.
November 23	Harvard at Yale; North Carolina at #11 Duke #9 Notre Dame at #8 Iowa; Missouri at Kansas	1:15 p.m.
November 28	Colgate at Brown #4 Texas A&M at Texas; Wyoming at Denver	1:15 p.m.
November 30	#10 Army vs. #8 Navy at Philadelphia, PA	1:15 p.m.
December 7	Pittsburgh at Miami (FL)	3:45 p.m.

=== 1958 ===
Date	Teams	Time (ET)
September 20	Vanderbilt at Missouri; Oklahoma State at Denver	4:45 p.m.
September 27	Tennessee at #3 Auburn	4:45 p.m.
October 4	Washington State at California	4:45 p.m.
October 11	#5 Ohio State at Illinois	2:15 p.m.
October 18	Penn State at Boston University #13 Iowa at #4 Wisconsin; UCLA at Washington	1:15 p.m.
October 25	#1 Army at Pittsburgh #11 Notre Dame at #15 Purdue; Washington State at USC	1:15 p.m.
November 1	Michigan State at #8 Wisconsin	1:15 p.m.
November 8	#14 Notre Dame at Pittsburgh; Michigan at Illinois; Stanford at Oregon	1:15 p.m.
November 15	Princeton at Yale #20 Northwestern at #8 Purdue; Oregon State at Stanford	1:15 p.m.
November 22	#15 Notre Dame at #6 Iowa	2:15 p.m.
November 27	Texas A&M at Texas	2:45 p.m.
November 29	#5 Army vs. Navy at Philadelphia, PA	1:15 p.m.
December 6	Holy Cross at Boston College	1:15 p.m.

=== 1959 ===
Date	Teams	Time (ET)
September 19	Rice at #1 LSU	4:45 p.m.
September 26	#2 Oklahoma at #10 Northwestern	3:15 p.m.
October 3	California at #10 Texas	5:15 p.m.
October 10	Penn at Princeton #10 Iowa at Michigan State	1:45 p.m.
October 17	Notre Dame at Michigan State	2:15 p.m.
October 24	#15 Iowa at #14 Purdue	3:15 p.m.
October 31	Air Force vs. Army at Bronx, NY; Indiana at #2 Northwestern	1:45 p.m.
November 7 (Doubleheader)	Pittsburgh at Boston College #18 Air Force at Missouri	1:15 p.m. 4:00 p.m.
November 14	Pittsburgh at Notre Dame #7 Wisconsin at Illinois	1:15 p.m.
November 21	#9 Wisconsin at Minnesota	2:15 p.m.
November 26	North Carolina at Duke	1:45 p.m.
November 28	Army vs. Navy at Philadelphia, PA	1:15 p.m.
December 5	#1 Syracuse at #17 UCLA	3:45 p.m.

=== 1964 ===
Date	Teams
September 12	UCLA at Pittsburgh
September 19	#10 Navy at Penn State; SMU at Florida; Kansas State at Wisconsin; Stanford at Washington State
September 26	Nebraska at Minnesota
October 3	Syracuse at Holy Cross #10 Washington at Iowa; TCU at Arkansas; Colorado State at Air Force
October 10	Oklahoma at #1 Texas
October 17	USC at #2 Ohio State
October 24	Dartmouth at Harvard; Minnesota at Michigan; Tennessee at #7 LSU; Iowa State at Missouri
October 31	Pittsburgh at Syracuse; NC State at South Carolina; Rice at Texas Tech; Air Force at Arizona
November 7	Illinois at Michigan
November 14	Michigan State at #1 Notre Dame
November 21	Cornell at Princeton; Duke at North Carolina; Michigan State at Illinois; USC at UCLA
November 26	Auburn at #2 Alabama
November 28	Army at Navy
December 5	Ole Miss at Mississippi State

=== 1965 ===
Date	Teams
September 11	Tulsa at Houston
September 18	#5 Alabama at Georgia; Kansas State at Indiana; Arizona at Utah #3 Notre Dame at California
September 25	Iowa at Oregon State
October 2	Ohio State at Washington
October 9	Pittsburgh at Duke
October 16	#1 Texas at #3 Arkansas
October 23	#4 USC at #7 Notre Dame
October 30	Duke at Georgia Tech; Illinois at #6 Purdue #7 Florida at Auburn; Idaho at Oregon
November 6	Air Force at Army in Chicago #5 Alabama at LSU; Baylor at Texas
November 13	Cornell at Dartmouth; Minnesota at Purdue; Ole Miss at #8 Tennessee #7 UCLA at Stanford
November 20	Harvard at Yale; Ohio State at Michigan #9 Texas Tech at #2 Arkansas #7 Missouri at Kansas
November 25	Oklahoma at #3 Nebraska
November 27	Army vs. Navy in Philadelphia
December 4	Penn State at Maryland

== See also ==
- College Football on NBC Sports
- College football on television
- Notre Dame Football on NBC
- NBC college bowl game broadcasts
