= 1953 Big Ten Conference football season =

- Sport: American football
- Teams: 10
- Top draft pick: Stan Wallace
- Champion: Michigan State
- Runners-up: Illinois
- Season MVP: Paul Giel

Football seasons
- ← 1952 1954 →

1953 Big Ten Conference football standings
	Conf.					Overall
Team	W		L		T	W		L		T
No. 3 Michigan State +	5	–	1	–	0	9	–	1	–	0
No. 7 Illinois +	5	–	1	–	0	7	–	1	–	1
No. 15 Wisconsin	4	–	1	–	1	6	–	2	–	1
Ohio State	4	–	3	–	0	6	–	3	–	0
Minnesota	3	–	3	–	1	4	–	4	–	1
No. 20 Michigan	3	–	3	–	0	6	–	3	–	0
No. 9 Iowa	3	–	3	–	0	5	–	3	–	1
Purdue	2	–	4	–	0	2	–	7	–	0
Indiana	1	–	5	–	0	2	–	7	–	0
Northwestern	0	–	6	–	0	3	–	6	–	0
+ – Conference co-champions; Rankings from AP Poll

The 1953 Big Ten Conference football season was the 58th season of college football played by the member schools of the Big Ten Conference (also known as the Western Conference) and was a part of the 1953 college football season.

The 1953 Michigan State Spartans football team, under head coach Biggie Munn, won the Big Ten championship in the program's first year of participating in the Big Ten. The Spartans compiled a 9–1 record and was ranked No. 3 in the final AP and UPI polls. End Don Dohoney was a consensus first-team All-American. Halfback Leroy Bolden was selected as the team's most valuable player.

The 1953 Illinois Fighting Illini football team, under head coach Ray Eliot, finished in second place in the Big Ten with a 7–1–1, led the conference with 25.3 points allowed per game, and was ranked No. 7 in the final AP Poll. Halfback J. C. Caroline was a consensus first-team All-American.

Minnesota quarterback Paul Giel was a consensus first-team All-American and received the Chicago Tribune Silver Football trophy as the Big Ten's most valuable player for the second consecutive year.

== Season overview ==
=== Results and team statistics ===
Conf. Rank	Team	Head coach	AP final	AP high	Overall record	Conf. record	PPG	PAG	MVP
1	Michigan State	Biggie Munn	#3	#2	9–1	5–1	24.0	11.0	LeRoy Beldon
2	Illinois	Ray Eliot	#7	#3	7–1–1	5–1	**25.3**	14.8	Don Ernst
3	Wisconsin	Ivy Williamson	#15	#8	6–2–1	4–1–1	19.9	12.2	Alan Ameche
4	Ohio State	Woody Hayes	NR	#3	6–3	4–3	20.2	18.2	George Jacoby
5 (tie)	Michigan	Bennie Oosterbaan	#20	#4	6–3	3–3	18.1	11.2	Tony Branoff
5 (tie)	Iowa	Forest Evashevski	#9	#9	5–3–1	3–3	20.8	**10.1**	Bill Fenton
7	Minnesota	Wes Fesler	NR	#13	4–4–1	3–3–1	16.7	17.8	**Paul Giel**
8	Purdue	Stu Holcomb	NR	NR	2–7	2–4	9.9	18.6	Tom Bettis
9	Indiana	Bernie Crimmins	NR	NR	2–7	1–5	13.2	25.2	Harry Jagielski
10	Northwestern	Bob Voigts	NR	#18	3-6	0-6	18.4	22.8	Bob Lauter

Key
AP final = Team's rank in the final AP Poll of the 1953 season
AP high = Team's highest rank in the AP Poll throughout the 1953 season
PPG = Average of points scored per game; conference leader's average displayed in bold
PAG = Average of points allowed per game; conference leader's average displayed in bold
MVP = Most valuable player as voted by players on each team as part of the voting process to determine the winner of the Chicago Tribune Silver Football trophy; trophy winner in bold

=== Regular season ===
==== September 26 ====
- Michigan State 21, Iowa 7.
- Illinois 21, Nebraska 21.
- Wisconsin 20, Penn State 0.
- Ohio State 36, Indiana 12.
- USC 17, Minnesota 7.
- Michigan 50, Washington 0.
- Missouri 14, Purdue 7.
- Northwestern 35, Iowa State 0.

==== October 3 ====
- Michigan State 21, Minnesota 0.
- Illinois 33, Stanford 21.
- Wisconsin 13, Marquette 11.
- Ohio State 33, California 19.
- Michigan 26, Tulane 7.
- Iowa 54, Washington 12.
- USC 27, Indiana 14 (game played October 2).
- Notre Dame 37, Purdue 7.
- Northwestern 33, Army 20.

==== October 10 ====
- Michigan State 26, TCU 19.
- Illinois 41, Ohio State 20.
- UCLA 13, Wisconsin 0 (game played October 9).
- Minnesota 30, Northwestern 13.
- Michigan 14, Iowa 13.
- Indiana 21, Marquette 20.
- Duke 20, Purdue 14.

==== October 17 ====
- Michigan State 47, Indiana 18.
- Illinois 27, Minnesota 7.
- Wisconsin 28, Purdue 19.
- Ohio State 12, Penn 6.
- Michigan 20, Northwestern 12.
- Iowa 21, Wyoming 17.

==== October 24 ====
- Purdue 6, Michigan State 0.
- Illinois 20, Syracuse 13.
- Ohio State 20, Wisconsin 19.
- Minnesota 22, Michigan 0.
- Iowa 19, Indiana 13.
- Northwestern 27, Pittsburgh 21 (game played October 25).

==== October 31 ====
- Michigan State 34, Oregon State 6.
- Illinois 21, Purdue 0.
- Wisconsin 10, Iowa 6.
- Ohio State 27, Northwestern 13.
- Minnesota 35, Pittsburgh 14.
- Michigan 24, Penn 14.
- Missouri 14, Indiana 7.

==== November 7 ====
- Michigan State 28, Ohio State 13.
- Illinois 19, Michigan 3.
- Wisconsin 34, Northwestern 13.
- Minnesota 28, Indiana 20.
- Iowa 26, Purdue 0.

==== November 14 ====
- Michigan State 14, Michigan 6.
- Wisconsin 34, Illinois 7.
- Ohio State 21, Purdue 6.
- Iowa 27, Minnesota 0.
- Indiana 14, Northwestern 6.

==== November 21 ====
- Michigan State 21, Marquette 15.
- Illinois 3, Northwestern 0.
- Minnesota 21, Wisconsin 21.
- Michigan 20, Ohio State 0.
- Iowa 14, Notre Dame 14.
- Purdue 30, Indiana 0.

=== Bowl games ===
On January 1, 1954, Michigan State defeated the UCLA, 28–20, at the Rose Bowl in Pasadena, California. Michigan State halfback Billy Wells was named the Rose Bowl player of the game. The 1954 Rose Bowl had the first color television "colorcast", viewable on 200 sets across the United States.

=== Post-season developments ===
Two Big Ten teams changed head coaches between the 1953 and 1954 seasons:

- In December 1953, Wes Fesler resigned as Minnesota's head coach to accept a position as a partner, vice president and sports director at Minneapolis radio station WDGY. In January 1954, Murray Warmath signed a four-year contract as Minnesota's new head football coach.
- In January 1954, Michigan State's head coach Biggie Munn was elevated to a new position as the school's athletic director. Longtime line coach Duffy Daugherty became the new head football coach.

== Awards and honors ==
=== All-Big Ten honors ===
The following players were picked by the Associated Press (AP)as first-team players on the 1953 All-Big Ten Conference football team.

Position	Name	Team	Selectors
End	Don Dohoney	Michigan State	AP
End	Bob Topp	Michigan	AP
Tackle	George Jacoby	Ohio State	AP
Tackle	Cal Jones	Iowa	AP
Guard	Jan Smid	Illinois	AP
Guard	Tom Bettis	Purdue	AP
Center	Jerry Hilgenberg	Iowa	AP
Back	Paul Giel	Minnesota	AP
Back	J. C. Caroline	Illinois	AP
Back	LeRoy Bolden	Michigan State	AP
Back	Alan Ameche	Wisconsin	AP

=== All-American honors ===
At the end of the 1953 season, Big Ten players secured three of 11 consensus first-team picks for the 1953 College Football All-America Team. The Big Ten's consensus All-Americans were:

Position	Name	Team	Selectors
Quarterback	Paul Giel	Minnesota	AAB, AFCA, AP, FWAA, INS, TSN, UP, WCFF
End	Don Dohoney	Michigan State	AFCA, AP, FWAA, NEA, TSN, UP, WCFF
Halfback	J. C. Caroline	Illinois	AFCA, FWAA, UP, WCFF

Other Big Ten players who were named first-team All-Americans by at least one selector were:

Position	Name	Team	Selectors
End	Joe Collier	Northwestern	INS
Center	Jerry Hilgenberg	Iowa	FWAA
Fullback	Alan Ameche	Wisconsin	FWAA

=== Other awards ===
Three Big Ten players finished among the top 10 in the voting for the 1953 Heisman Trophy: Minnesota running back Paul Giel (second); Wisconsin running back Alan Ameche (sixth); and Illinois running back J. C. Caroline (seventh).

== 1954 NFL draft ==
The following Big Ten players were among the first 100 picks in the 1954 NFL draft:

Name	Position	Team	Round	Overall pick
Stan Wallace	Back	Illinois	1	6
John Bauer	Guard	Illinois	1	12
Rocky Ryan	End	Illinois	2	21
Jim Neal	Center	Michigan State	2	25
Jerry Hilgenberg	Center	Iowa	4	48
Don Dohoney	End	Michigan State	5	50
Billy Wells	Back	Michigan State	5	56
George Jacoby	Tackle	Ohio State	6	65
Ken Panfil	Tackle	Purdue	6	70
Harry Jagielski	Tackle	Indiana	7	80
