= 1953 Iowa Hawkeyes football team =

American college football season

1953 Iowa Hawkeyes football
- Conference: Big Ten Conference

Ranking
- Coaches: No. 10
- AP: No. 9
- Record: 5–3–1 (3–3 Big Ten)
- Head coach: Forest Evashevski (2nd season)
- MVP: Bill Fenton
- Captain: Andrew Houg
- Home stadium: Iowa Stadium

1953 Big Ten Conference football standings
	Conf.					Overall
Team	W		L		T	W		L		T
No. 3 Michigan State +	5	–	1	–	0	9	–	1	–	0
No. 7 Illinois +	5	–	1	–	0	7	–	1	–	1
No. 15 Wisconsin	4	–	1	–	1	6	–	2	–	1
Ohio State	4	–	3	–	0	6	–	3	–	0
Minnesota	3	–	3	–	1	4	–	4	–	1
No. 20 Michigan	3	–	3	–	0	6	–	3	–	0
No. 9 Iowa	3	–	3	–	0	5	–	3	–	1
Purdue	2	–	4	–	0	2	–	7	–	0
Indiana	1	–	5	–	0	2	–	7	–	0
Northwestern	0	–	6	–	0	3	–	6	–	0
+ – Conference co-champions; Rankings from AP Poll

The 1953 Iowa Hawkeyes football team was an American football team that represented the University of Iowa as a member of the Big Ten Conference during the 1953 Big Ten football season. In their second season under head coach Forest Evashevski, the Hawkeyes compiled a 5–3–1 record (3–3 in conference games), finished in a three-way tie for fifth place in the Big Ten, and outscored opponents by a total of 187 to 91. Two of their losses came against No. 2 Michigan State and No. 5 Michigan. They closed their season with a victory over No. 15 Minnesota and a 14–14 tie with No. 1 Notre Dame. The Hawkeyes were rewarded for their strong finish with the No. 9 ranking in the final AP poll. It was the first time an Iowa team had been ranked in the final AP poll since 1939.

The 1953 Hawkeyes gained 2,147 rushing yards and 586 passing yards. On defense, they gave up 1,050 rushing yards and 1,208 passing yards. The Hawkeyes set Iowa records (both later broken) for most rushing yards in a season (2,147) and in a game (396 vs. Washington State). They also set the school's record for scoring defense by giving up only 10.1 points per game; the 1953 team's scoring defense mark now ranks second in Iowa history.

The team's statistical leaders included George "Binky" Broeder (410 rushing yards); Lou Matykiewicz (18-of-44 passing for 234 yards); Frank Gilliam (12 receptions for 71 yards); and George "Dusty" Rice (60 points scored). Jerry Hilgenberg, who played at center on offense and linebacker on defense, was selected as a first-team All-American and a first-team All-Big Ten player.

Iowa played it first nationally televised game on October 24, 1953, as its game with Indiana was broadcast by NBC. The team played its home games at Iowa Stadium in Iowa City, Iowa. Home attendance was 211,109, an average of 42,222 per game.

== Schedule ==
Date	Opponent	Rank	Site	TV	Result	Attendance	Source
September 26	No. 2 Michigan State		Iowa Stadium; Iowa City, IA		L 7–21	47,125	
October 3	Washington State*		Iowa Stadium; Iowa City, IA		W 54–12	31,500	
October 10	at No. 5 Michigan		Michigan Stadium; Ann Arbor, MI		L 13–14	49,551	
October 17	Wyoming*		Iowa Stadium; Iowa City, IA		W 21–7	29,000	
October 24	Indiana^{†}		Iowa Stadium; Iowa City, IA	NBC	W 19–13	50,129	
October 31	at Wisconsin		Camp Randall Stadium; Madison, WI (rivalry)		L 6–10	52,819	
November 7	at Purdue		Ross–Ade Stadium; West Lafayette, IN		W 26–0	35,000	
November 14	No. 15 Minnesota		Iowa Stadium; Iowa City, IA (rivalry)		W 27–0	55,355	
November 21	at No. 1 Notre Dame*	No. 20	Notre Dame Stadium; Notre Dame, IN		T 14–14	56,478	
*Non-conference game; ^{†}Homecoming; Rankings from AP Poll released prior to the game

== Personnel ==
=== Players ===
The following players received varsity letters for their performance on the 1952 Iowa football team:

- Charles Boothe, tackle, senior, 6-0, 205 pounds, Galesburg, IL
- George "Binky" Broeder, fullback, junior, 5-8, 180 pounds, St. Louis, MO
- Don Chelf, tackle, senior, No. 77, 6-3, 215 pounds, West Liberty, IA
- Jerry Clark, tackle, senior, 5-9, 195 pounds, Independence, IA
- Bob Commings, guard, sophomore, 5-9, 180 pounds, Youngstown, OH
- Cameron Cummins, junior, 6-1, 200 pounds, Cedar Rapids, IA
- Bill Fenton, end and MVP, senior, No. 30, 6-3, 210 pounds, Iowa City, IA
- James Freeman, end, sophomore, 6-4, 230 pounds, Iowa City, IA
- Frank Gilliam, end, sophomore, No. 37, 6-2, 176 pounds, Steubenville, OH
- John Hall Jr., tackle, junior, 6-1, 200 pounds, Chicago
- Jerry Hilgenberg, center/linebacker, senior, No. 52, 6-2, 196 pounds, Wilton, IA
- Andy Houg, tackle and captain, senior, 6-3, 195 pounds, St. Ansgar, IA
- Cal Jones, tackle, sophomore, No. 62, 6-0, 210 pounds, Steubenville, OH
- Paul Kemp, quarterback, senior, 6-2, 175 pounds, Waterloo, IA
- George Kress, guard, sophomore, 6-2, 235 pounds, Dubuque, IA
- Warren "Bud" Lawson, center, junior, 6-1, 200 pounds, Fairfield, IA
- Lyle Leinbaugh, halfback, senior, 5-10, 170 pounds, Holstein, IA
- Ed Lindsey, end, senior, 6-1, 190 pounds, Davenport, IA
- Eldean Matheson, halfback, sophomore, 6-0, 170 pounds, Lake Mills, IA
- Lou Matykiewicz, quarterback, junior, No. 23, 6-2, 185 pounds, Calumet Park, IL
- Terry Moran, quarterback, sophomore, 5-9, 185 pounds, River Forest, IL
- Bob Phillips, halfback, senior, 5-11, 180 pounds, Cedar Rapids, IA
- Jerry Reichow, quarterback, sophomore, No. 25, 6-2 1/2, 195 pounds, Decorah, IA
- George "Dusty" Rice, halfback, senior, 5-11, 175 pounds, Oelwein, IA
- Earl Smith, halfback, sophomore, 5-11, 170 pounds, Gary, IN
- Bob Stearnes, halfback, junior, 4-8, 170 pounds, Gary, IN
- Rodger Swedberg, tackle, sophomore, 6-1, 215 pounds, Sycamore, IL
- Eddie Vincent, halfback, sophomore, No. 41, 5-11, 170 pounds, Steubenville, IA
- Roger Wiegmann, fullback, sophomore, 6-2, 205 pounds, Waverly, IA

=== Coaches and administration ===
- Head coach: Forest Evashevski
- Assistant coach: Bump Elliott
- Athletic director: Paul Brechler

== Awards and honors ==
Senior Jerry Hilgenberg, who played at center on offense and linebacker on defense, was selected by the Football Writers Association of America (FWAA) as a first-team player on the 1953 All-America team. He received second-team honors from the Associated Press (AP). Hilegenberg also received first-team honors from the AP and United Press (UP) on the 1953 All-Big Ten Conference football team. Hilgenberg was later inducted into the Iowa Letterwinners Club Hall of Fame.

Sophomore guard Cal Jones received first-team honors from the AP, and second-team honors from the UP, on the All-Big Ten team. Jones was later inducted into the College Football Hall of Fame and the Iowa Letterwinners Club Hall of Fame.

End Bill Fenton was selected as Iowa's most valuable player for the second consecutive year. He also received second-team All-Big Ten honors from the AP. Fenton was also selected as an Academic All-American for the second consecutive year.

Tackle Andrew Houg was the team captain.

== 1954 NFL draft ==
The following Iowa players were selected in the 1954 NFL draft:

Player	Position	Round	Pick	NFL club
Jerry Hilgenberg	Center	4	48	Cleveland Browns
Don Chelf	Tackle	12	136	Baltimore Colts
Jim Head	Back	14	168	Cleveland Browns
George Rice	Back	16	185	New York Giants
