= Leroy Bolden =

American football player (1932–2008)

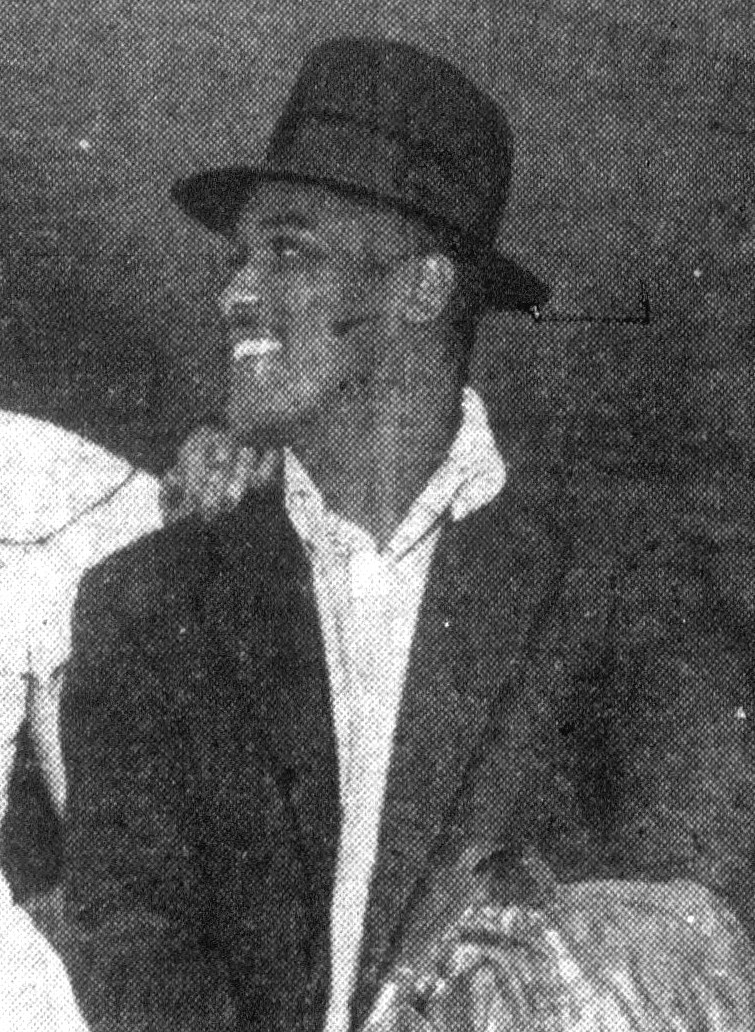
- Bolden in 1953

No. 45
- Position: Halfback

Personal information
- Born: August 24, 1932; Wabash, Arkansas, U.S.
- Died: October 31, 2008 (aged 76); Roanoke, Virginia, U.S.
- Listed height: 5 ft 8 in (1.73 m)
- Listed weight: 170 lb (77 kg)

Career information
- High school: Flint Northern (Flint, Michigan)
- College: Michigan State
- NFL draft: 1955: 6th round, 73rd overall pick

Career history
- Cleveland Browns (1958–1959); Dallas Cowboys (1960)*
- * Offseason or practice squad member only

Awards and highlights
- National champion (1952); Second-team All-American (1953); First-team All-Big Ten (1953)

Career NFL statistics
- Games played: 23
- Starts: 1
- Rushing yds: 66 (3.5 average)
- Kick return yds: 532
- Stats at Pro Football Reference

Leroy Bolden, Jr. (August 24, 1932 – October 31, 2008) was an American professional football halfback in the National Football League (NFL) for the Cleveland Browns. He played college football for the Michigan State Spartans and was selected by the Browns in the sixth round of the 1955 NFL draft.

== Early life ==
Bolden was born in Wabash, Arkansas, and attended Northern High School in Flint, Michigan, where he was an All-state halfback and contributed to the school winning a state championship in 1950. He also ran the 100 and 220-yard dash events on the track team, contributing to the school winning the state championship in 1949 and 1950.

== College career ==
He played college football for Michigan State University from 1952 to 1954. As a member of the undefeated, national champion 1952 Michigan State Spartans football team, he gained 414 rushing yards on 53 carries, an average of 7.8 yards per carry.

The following year, he led the 1953 Spartans (#3 in the final AP Poll) with 691 rushing yards on 127 carries, an average of 5.4 yards per carry. At the end of the 1953 season, Bolden was selected by the Associated Press as a first-team All-Big Ten player, and by the United Press as a second-team player on the 1953 College Football All-America Team.

== Professional career ==
Bolden was selected by the Cleveland Browns in the sixth round (73rd overall) of the 1955 NFL draft. He would lose some of the prime years of his career to military service, however, unable to take the field until the 1958 NFL season.

He appeared in 23 games and gained 66 rushing yards on 19 carries for the Browns. He was used mostly as kickoff returner, registering 23 returns for 532 yards, including a 102-yard return for a touchdown in 1958.

Bolden was selected by the Dallas Cowboys in the 1960 NFL expansion draft and was released before the start of the season.

== Life after football ==
After football, he worked for Encyclopædia Britannica and Hewlett-Packard. He also served as an assistant director of admissions for Stanford University's graduate business school.

== Death and legacy ==
Bolden died October 31, 2008, in Roanoke, Virginia. He was 76 years old at the time of his death.

In 1985, he was inducted into the Greater Flint Area Sports Hall of Fame. In 1989, he was inducted into the Greater Flint Afro-American Hall of Fame.
