= 1953 Indiana Hoosiers football team =

American college football season

1953 Indiana Hoosiers football
- Conference: Big Ten Conference
- Record: 2–7 (1–5 Big Ten)
- Head coach: Bernie Crimmins (2nd season)
- MVP: Harry Jagielski
- Captain: Bob Inserra
- Home stadium: Memorial Stadium

1953 Big Ten Conference football standings
	Conf.					Overall
Team	W		L		T	W		L		T
No. 3 Michigan State +	5	–	1	–	0	9	–	1	–	0
No. 7 Illinois +	5	–	1	–	0	7	–	1	–	1
No. 15 Wisconsin	4	–	1	–	1	6	–	2	–	1
Ohio State	4	–	3	–	0	6	–	3	–	0
Minnesota	3	–	3	–	1	4	–	4	–	1
No. 20 Michigan	3	–	3	–	0	6	–	3	–	0
No. 9 Iowa	3	–	3	–	0	5	–	3	–	1
Purdue	2	–	4	–	0	2	–	7	–	0
Indiana	1	–	5	–	0	2	–	7	–	0
Northwestern	0	–	6	–	0	3	–	6	–	0
+ – Conference co-champions; Rankings from AP Poll

The 1953 Indiana Hoosiers football team represented the Indiana Hoosiers in the 1953 Big Ten Conference football season. They participated as members of the Big Ten Conference. The Hoosiers played their home games at Memorial Stadium in Bloomington, Indiana. The team was coached by Bernie Crimmins, in his second year as head coach of the Hoosiers.

== Schedule ==
Date	Opponent	Site	TV	Result	Attendance	Source
September 26	at No. 7 Ohio State	Ohio Stadium; Columbus, OH		L 12–36	75,898	
October 2	at No. 7 USC*	Los Angeles Memorial Coliseum; Los Angeles CA		L 14–27	49,598	
October 10	Marquette*	Memorial Stadium; Bloomington, IN		W 21–20	27,000–27,594	
October 17	at No. 2 Michigan State	Macklin Stadium; East Lansing, MI (rivalry)		L 18–47	51,698	
October 24	at Iowa	Iowa Stadium; Iowa City, IA	NBC	L 13–19	50,129	
October 31	Missouri*	Memorial Stadium; Bloomington, IN		L 7–14	22,000	
November 7	at No. 13 Minnesota	Memorial Stadium; Minneapolis, MN		L 20–28	58,527–59,486	
November 14	Northwestern	Memorial Stadium; Bloomington, IN		W 14–6	20,000	
November 21	Purdue	Memorial Stadium; Bloomington, IN (Old Oaken Bucket)		L 0–30	33,000	
*Non-conference game; Rankings from AP Poll released prior to the game

== 1954 NFL draftees ==
Player	Position	Round	Pick	NFL club
Harry Jagielski	Tackle	7	80	Washington Redskins
