= 1953 Illinois Fighting Illini football team =

American college football season

1953 Illinois Fighting Illini football

Big Ten co-champion
- Conference: Big Ten Conference

Ranking
- Coaches: No. 7
- AP: No. 7
- Record: 7–1–1 (5–1 Big Ten)
- Head coach: Ray Eliot (12th season)
- MVP: Don Ernst
- Captain: Robert Lenzini
- Home stadium: Memorial Stadium

1953 Big Ten Conference football standings
	Conf.					Overall
Team	W		L		T	W		L		T
No. 3 Michigan State +	5	–	1	–	0	9	–	1	–	0
No. 7 Illinois +	5	–	1	–	0	7	–	1	–	1
No. 15 Wisconsin	4	–	1	–	1	6	–	2	–	1
Ohio State	4	–	3	–	0	6	–	3	–	0
Minnesota	3	–	3	–	1	4	–	4	–	1
No. 20 Michigan	3	–	3	–	0	6	–	3	–	0
No. 9 Iowa	3	–	3	–	0	5	–	3	–	1
Purdue	2	–	4	–	0	2	–	7	–	0
Indiana	1	–	5	–	0	2	–	7	–	0
Northwestern	0	–	6	–	0	3	–	6	–	0
+ – Conference co-champions; Rankings from AP Poll

The 1953 Illinois Fighting Illini football team was an American football team that represented the University of Illinois as a member of the Big Ten Conference during the 1953 Big Ten season. In their 12th year under head coach Ray Eliot, the Fighting Illini compiled a 7–1–1 record (5–1 in conference games), tied for first place in the Big Ten, and outscored opponents by a total of 228 to 133. They were ranked No. 7 in the final AP poll. The sole defeat was a 34–7 loss to Wisconsin.

Tackle Don Ernst was selected as the team's most valuable player. Sophomore halfback J. C. Caroline led the team with 1,256 rushing yards on 194 attempts (6.5 yards per carry) and was selected as a consensus first-team player on the 1953 All-America team. Guard John Bauer was selected by the Newspaper Enterprise Association as a third-team All-American. Guard Jan Smid and back J. C. Caroline received first-team honors on the 1953 All-Big Ten Conference football team.

The team played its home games at Memorial Stadium in Champaign, Illinois.

== Schedule ==
Date	Opponent	Rank	Site	Result	Attendance
September 26	Nebraska*		Memorial Stadium; Champaign, IL	T 21–21	40,011
October 3	Stanford*		Memorial Stadium; Champaign, IL	W 33–21	32,737
October 10	at No. 3 Ohio State		Ohio Stadium; Columbus, OH (Illibuck)	W 41–20	81,745
October 17	Minnesota	No. 9	Memorial Stadium; Champaign, IL	W 27–7	55,641
October 24	Syracuse*	No. 7	Memorial Stadium; Champaign, IL	W 20–13	30,076
October 31	Purdue	No. 4	Memorial Stadium; Champaign, IL (rivalry)	W 21–0	57,210
November 7	No. 17 Michigan^{†}	No. 4	Memorial Stadium; Champaign, IL (series)	W 19–3	69,507
November 14	at Wisconsin	No. 3	Camp Randall Stadium; Madison, WI	L 7–34	52,887
November 21	at Northwestern	No. 7	Dyche Stadium; Evanston, IL (rivalry)	W 3–0	51,039
*Non-conference game; ^{†}Homecoming; Rankings from AP Poll released prior to the game

== Roster ==
Player	Position
Peter Palmer
Robert Bishop
John Ryan	End, Defensive Back
Robert Lenzini (captain)	Guard
Roger Wolf
Jan Smid	Guard
Stephen Nosek	Quarterback
John Bauer	Guard, Tackle
Michael Gaus
Jack Chamblin
David Bauer	Defensive Back
Paul Furimsky
Dean Wilmann
Dale Foster
Paul Luhrsen
Baird Stewart
James Pollitt
Richard Kohlhagen
Kenneth Swienton
Floyd McAfee
James Calder
Ronald Yochem
Robert Wiman
Don Ernst
Randall Rayborn
Francis Hoffman
Joseph Yusko
Walter Vernasco	End
Donald Bostrom
James Bronson
Em Lindbeck
Hugh Woodson
Patrick Phillips
Jerry Markbreit
George Walsh
Clarence DeMoss	Halfback
Herbert Badal
James Minor
Terry Matthews
Kenneth Miller	Fullback
Stan Wallace	Defensive Back
Donald Tate
James Dunne
Jack Sopkin
Robert Alexander
Gus Mackris
Roger Meuller
Richard Piggott
Charles Schiesser
Richard Rosenberg
Robert Desenfants
Rudolf Siegert
Donald Grothe
Thomas Miller	Placekicker
J. C. Caroline	Halfback, Defensive Back
Robert Graeff
Richard Ohls
Melvin Bates	Fullback
Dean Renn
Clifford Waldbeser
Elry Falkenstein	Quarterback
Herbert Borman

- Head coach: Ray Eliot (12th year at Illinois)
