= 1953 Nebraska Cornhuskers football team =

American college football season

1953 Nebraska Cornhuskers football
- Conference: Big Seven Conference
- Record: 3–6–1 (2–4 Big 7)
- Head coach: Bill Glassford (5th season)
- Offensive scheme: Single-wing, T formation
- Home stadium: Memorial Stadium

1953 Big Seven Conference football standings
	Conf.					Overall
Team	W		L		T	W		L		T
No. 4 Oklahoma $	6	–	0	–	0	9	–	1	–	1
Missouri	4	–	2	–	0	6	–	4	–	0
Kansas State	4	–	2	–	0	6	–	3	–	1
Colorado	2	–	4	–	0	6	–	4	–	0
Nebraska	2	–	4	–	0	3	–	6	–	1
Kansas	2	–	4	–	0	2	–	8	–	0
Iowa State	1	–	5	–	0	2	–	7	–	0
$ – Conference champion; Rankings from AP Poll

The 1953 Nebraska Cornhuskers football team was the representative of the University of Nebraska and member of the Big 7 Conference in the 1953 college football season. The team was coached by Bill Glassford and played their home games at Memorial Stadium in Lincoln, Nebraska.

== Before the season ==
Coach Glassford's fifth year began with uncertainty, as no clear pattern had yet emerged as to what to expect from the program under his leadership. After alternating losing and winning seasons since his arrival, any relief the Cornhusker faithful had felt at the improvement in fortunes since the dismal 1940s was fading as expectations held out for greater successes along the lines of what the program had been known for since its beginning. The coaching staff remained essentially intact with just one change as a former Pittsburgh head coach joined the program as an assistant.

== Schedule ==
Date	Time	Opponent	Site	TV	Result	Attendance
September 19	2:00 pm	Oregon*	Memorial Stadium; Lincoln, NE	NBC	L 12–20	31,000
September 26	1:30 pm	at Illinois*	Memorial Stadium; Champaign, IL		T 21–21	40,011
October 3	2:00 pm	at Kansas State	Memorial Stadium; Manhattan, KS (rivalry)		L 0–27	12,500
October 10	12:30 pm	at No. 17 Pittsburgh*	Pitt Stadium; Pittsburgh, PA		L 6–14	20,666
October 17	2:00 pm	Miami (FL)*	Memorial Stadium; Lincoln, NE (rivalry)		W 20–16	39,000
October 24	2:00 pm	at Missouri	Memorial Stadium; Columbia, MO (rivalry)		L 7–23	26,500
October 31	2:00 pm	Kansas	Memorial Stadium; Lincoln, NE (rivalry)		W 9–0	33,000
November 7	2:00 pm	at Iowa State	Clyde Williams Field; Ames, IA (rivalry)		W 27–19	12,116
November 14	2:00 pm	Colorado^{†}	Memorial Stadium; Lincoln, NE		L 10–14	36,000
November 21	2:00 pm	No. 4 Oklahoma	Memorial Stadium; Lincoln, NE (rivalry)		L 7–30	31,551
*Non-conference game; ^{†}Homecoming; Rankings from AP Poll released prior to the game

== Roster ==
Official Roster
77 Anderson, Quinlyn T (So.); 14 Bordogna, John HB (Sr.); 81 Braley, Jack E (So.); 62 Brandt, Don G (So.); 54 Britt, Ted C (Sr.); 20 Brown, Dan QB (Jr.); 64 Bryant, Charles G (Jr.); 18 Cederdahl, James HB (Jr.); 44 Cifra, George FB (Jr.); 15 Cochrane, Ladd HB (So.); 70 Connor, Ted T (Sr.); 16 Edwards, John FB (So.); 73 Evans, Pev T (Jr.); 13 Fischer, Rex HB (So.); 75 Gallion, Larry T (So.); 79 Glantz, Don T (Jr.); 23 Gohde, George QB (Sr.); 71 Goth, Harvey T (Sr.); 69 Griess, Demas G (Jr.); 22 Harris, Sylvester FB (So.); 80 Hawkins, William E (So.); 84 Hewitt, Don E (Jr.); 72 Holloran, William T (Jr.); 11 Kennedy, Max HB (Sr.); 74 Kitzelman, Max T (Jr.); 30 Korinek, Dennis HB (Jr.); 67 Korisko, Jerry G (So.); 68 Kripal, Tom G (Jr.); 27 Lair, Gale G (So.)	89 Loehr, Andy E (Jr.); 86 Lux, Dean E (So.); 61 Machisic, John G (Sr.); 21 McWilliams, Jon HB (So.); 76 Minnick, Jerry T (Sr.); 24 Moore, Kenneth QB (Jr.); 78 Moore, Richard T (So.); 51 Neal, Richard C (So.); 82 Neumann, LaVerne E (So.); 17 Novak, Ray FB (Sr.); 53 Oberlin, Bob C (Jr.); 50 Oliver, Jim C (Sr.); 63 Paulson, Jerry G (Sr.); 55 Post, Doran C (So.); 52 Ramsey, Ron C (So.); 25 Rankin, Duane QB (Jr.); 19 Reeves, Franklin HB (So.); 83 Reiners, Ken E (Jr.); 10 Rolston, Dirkes HB (Jr.); 43 Rosen, Leonard T (So.); 85 Schabacker, William E (Sr.); 41 Smith, Robert HB (Jr.); 66 Sorenson, Harold G (So.); 12 Thayer, Bill HB (Jr.); 26 Trauthen, Don QB (So.); 65 Wagner, Bob G (Jr.); 88 Weddle, Ralph E (So.); 87 Yeager, Jerry E (Sr.); 33 Yeisley, James FB (Jr.)

== Coaching staff ==
Name	Title	First year in this position	Years at Nebraska	Alma mater
Bill Glassford	Head coach	1949	1949–1955	Pittsburgh
L. F. "Pop" Klein	Assistant coach	1945	1945–1958	
Ray Prochaska	Ends Coach	1950	1947–1948, 1950–1954	Nebraska
Ike Hanscomb	B-Squad Coach	1948	1948–1953	
Bob Davis	Backfield Coach	1949	1949–1955	
Robert Faris	Freshman Coach	1952	1952–1954	
Mike Milligan		1953	1953–1955	Pittsburgh

== Game summaries ==
=== Oregon ===
Team	1	2	Total
• Oregon			20
Nebraska			12

- Date: September 19
- Location: Memorial Stadium • Lincoln, Nebraska
- Game attendance: 31,000

Oregon arrived in Lincoln for the second-ever meeting of the programs following last year's 28–13 Nebraska victory in Eugene. The Cornhuskers came out flat, and gave up two turnovers to the Ducks in the first quarter, both of which were converted into points. Nebraska managed only one meaningful drive during the entire contest, and Oregon departed having dealt the Cornhuskers a home-field loss to start the 1953 campaign.

=== Illinois ===
Team	1	2	Total
Nebraska			21
Illinois			21

- Date: September 26
- Location: Memorial Stadium • Champaign, Illinois
- Game attendance: 40,011

The Cornhuskers traveled to Champaign to renew a series last contested in 1925, facing a favored Illinois team. The single-wing formation shown by coach Glassford against Oregon was nowhere to be found as Nebraska came out in the classic T-formation, to everyone's surprise. A heavy air attack was also mounted against the unsuspecting Fighting Illini, and the Cornhuskers ran out to a 21–7 lead as the game clock began to wane. Illinois mounted a final counterattack that was enough to storm back and tie the game up at 21, but they could not produce an outright win. Nebraska was now 5–2–1 against the Fighting Illini all-time. Illinois went on the finish the season 7–1–1 and ranked #7 by the AP Poll.

=== Kansas State ===
Team	1	2	Total
Nebraska			0
• Kansas State			27

- Date: October 3
- Location: Memorial Stadium • Manhattan, Kansas

An untimely fumble was all it took to spark Kansas State, as the Wildcats promptly converted the turnover into a touchdown. Kansas State never looked back and reeled off a total of 27 unanswered points. The flat Nebraska squad was thoroughly humiliated, as the Wildcats set new series records for most points scored on Nebraska and largest margin of victory. Even through the painful 1940s Nebraska had still managed to win eight of ten Kansas State games in that decade, and ten in a row against the Wildcats overall, before this completely demoralizing defeat. The win was just the fifth ever for Kansas State against the Cornhuskers in all 37 attempts.

=== Pittsburgh ===
Team	1	2	Total
Nebraska			6
• #17 Pittsburgh			14

- Date: October 10
- Location: Pitt Stadium • Pittsburgh
- Game attendance: 20,666

The Cornhuskers traveled to Pittsburgh to renew another dormant series, facing the Panthers again for the first time since the bitter rivalry stalled after 1942. Pittsburgh's homecoming crowd watched nervously as the teams battled viciously throughout the entire game, and Nebraska was clinging to a tenuous 7–6 lead late. All of the frustrations harbored by the Cornhuskers following the devastating and record-breaking loss to Kansas State the week prior seemed to be bubbling to the surface. Finally, on the last play of the game, the Panthers punched in a final score to secure the win, sending the disappointed Nebraska squad home with just three wins in the overall series in all eighteen tries. Nebraska was now without a win in the first four games of the season for the first time since 1945.

=== Miami ===
Team	1	2	Total
Miami			16
• Nebraska			20

- Date: October 17
- Location: Memorial Stadium • Lincoln, Nebraska
- Game attendance: 39,000

Miami arrived in Lincoln for the first time ever, as the squads met for only their second contest. The Nebraska passing defense was again suspect, and fumbles proved to almost be the undoing of the Nebraska attack. Somehow the Cornhuskers managed to produce enough points to overcome their troubles and Miami, and recorded the first win of 1953 to even the series at 1–1.

=== Missouri ===
Team	1	2	Total
Nebraska			7
• Missouri			23

- Date: October 24
- Location: Faurot Field • Columbia, Missouri
- Game attendance: 26,500

Nebraska found itself on a foreign field for an opponent's homecoming game for the second time of the year in Columbia. The Cornhuskers quieted the crowd briefly by scoring first to go up 7–0, but the Tigers responded in kind and did not let up until the final whistle ended the 23–7 decision. It was Missouri's third straight over Nebraska as the Tigers chipped away at their series deficit, moving to 18–25–3. The loss was Nebraska's 50th all-time conference defeat.

=== Kansas ===
Team	1	2	3	4	Total
Kansas	0	0	0	0	0
• Nebraska	0	0	6	3	9

- Date: October 31
- Location: Memorial Stadium, Lincoln, Nebraska
- Game attendance: 33,000

Once again the day was nearly defined by Nebraska's ongoing problem with fumbles, but a stiff Cornhusker defensive stand kept the Jayhawks off of the scoreboard to secure a shutout victory of Kansas, which was also the first Nebraska home field win over Kansas since 1945. The game had remained scoreless until the third quarter before even Nebraska found a way to cross the line, but the win was welcome and moved Nebraska to 43–13–3 in the series to date.

=== Iowa State ===
Team	1	2	Total
• Nebraska			27
Iowa State			19

- Date: November 7
- Location: Clyde Williams Field • Ames, Iowa
- Game attendance: 12,000

Nebraska managed to run up to a respectable lead early enough to grant some reserve players valuable on field time, and the backups rose to the challenge by shutting down Iowa State's late rally to deny the Cyclone comeback. The highlights of the game were an 89-yard interception return for a touchdown, and a new-found solid Cornhusker pass defense. The win was Nebraska's 8th straight in the series, as they moved to 38–8–1 against Iowa State all-time.

=== Colorado ===
Team	1	2	Total
• Colorado			14
Nebraska			10

- Date: November 14
- Location: Memorial Stadium • Lincoln, Nebraska
- Game attendance: 36,000

The solid game effort seen against Iowa State seemed to fade as the Cornhuskers again struggled with untimely mistakes. Despite the miscues, Nebraska still had one final chance to snatch a victory, but was denied by a strong Colorado defensive stand on the goal line as time expired. It was another ruined Cornhusker homecoming, the third in a row, as Nebraska's series lead against Colorado slipped to just 7–5.

=== Oklahoma ===
Team	1	2	Total
• #4 Oklahoma			30
Nebraska			7

- Date: November 21
- Location: Memorial Stadium • Lincoln, Nebraska
- Game attendance: 30,000

Reigning league champion Oklahoma arrived in Lincoln at #4 in the AP Poll, and had little difficulty putting away the Cornhuskers to close out Nebraska's slate. It was the 37th straight Big 7 victory for the Sooners, as their entrenched dominance helped them to yet another conference championship. Nebraska had now lost eleven straight games to Oklahoma in a row, further extending the record single-team losing streak, and Nebraska's series edge narrowed to just 16–14–3.

== After the season ==
The up and down alternating annual cycle that seemed to define coach Glassford's Nebraska career to date continued, as the Cornhuskers posted another losing season, his third in five years at the helm. Coach Glassford still retained an overall losing record at 20–25–3 (.448), and the 2–4 1953 conference slate dragged his conference career total below average, to 14–15–1 (.483). The football program's all-time conference record slipped to 134–52–12 (.707), and the overall record was now 336–173–34 (.650), the lowest percentage it had been since 1901.

Sentiment was growing for change at the top, from supporters and even apparently from players, and the pressure contributed to the resignation of Athletic Director (and former head football coach) George Clark. The board requested the resignation of coach Glassford, but his contract, coupled with out-of-state support, contributed to Glassford surviving the storm and staying on at Nebraska. Another former head football coach, Adolph J. Lewandowski, who had preceded Clark and helmed Nebraska football in 1943 and 1944, was named acting Athletic Director.

== Future NFL and other professional league players ==
- Charley Bryant, 1955 24th-round pick of the Green Bay Packers
- Ted Connor, 1954 3rd-round pick of the Philadelphia Eagles
- Don Glantz, 1955 5th-round pick of the Washington Redskins
- Jerry Minnick, 1954 9th-round pick of the Washington Redskins
- Ray Novak, 1954 14th-round pick of the Detroit Lions
- Bob Smith, 1955 15th-round pick of the Cleveland Browns
