= Tony Branoff =

American football player (1934–2012)

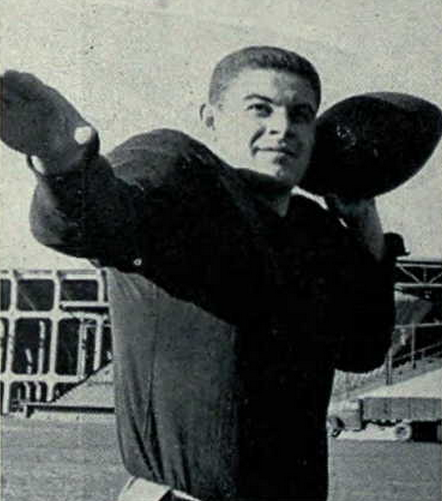
- Branoff c. 1955

Profile
- Position: Halfback

Personal information
- Born: January 1, 1934; Flint, Michigan, U.S.
- Died: December 20, 2012 (aged 78); Saline, Michigan, U.S.
- Listed height: 5 ft 11 in (1.80 m)
- Listed weight: 181 lb (82 kg)

Career information
- High school: Flint Central High School
- College: Michigan (1952–1955)

Awards and highlights
- First-team All-Big Ten (1955)

Anthonios "Tony" Branoff (January 1, 1934 – December 20, 2012) was an American football player. He played at the halfback position for the University of Michigan from 1952 to 1955. He was chosen as the Most Valuable Player on the 1953 Michigan Wolverines football team. He was the first sophomore to win the award. He also led the Wolverines in rushing in both 1953 and 1955.

== Early years in Flint ==
Branoff grew up in Flint, Michigan, and played football for Flint Central High School in 1950 and 1951. He scored two touchdowns, including a 75-yard punt return against Kalamazoo Central High School as a senior. He was selected by the Associated Press to its All-Michigan football team in 1951. He tore cartilage in his left knee against Saginaw Arthur Hill during his senior year in high school, an injury that would affect Branoff throughout his football career. He was always outstanding in the Flint Northern Thanksgiving games.

== University of Michigan ==
=== 1952 season ===
Branoff enrolled early at the University of Michigan in January 1952. As a second-semester freshman, he appeared in all 9 games for Michigan's football team on both defense and offense, including 6 games as the team's starting right halfback. He broke into the starting lineup after Frank Howell was injured. He scored his first touchdown in a 28–13 win over Indiana on October 11, 1952. The Associated Press noted, "Tony Branoff, Michigan's burly second semester freshman from Flint, Mich., came alive after the intermission and scored the touch down, that gave momentum to the Wolverines and a 14–6 lead." In early November, he added a defensive touchdown as he recovered a fumble in the end zone against Illinois. He also scored a rushing touchdown in a come-from-behind win over Purdue in mid-November 1951. Branoff's best performance of the 1952 season came in a 49–7 win over Cornell on November 8, 1952; Branoff gained 88 yards on 14 carries for an average of 6.3 yards per carry.

=== 1953 season ===
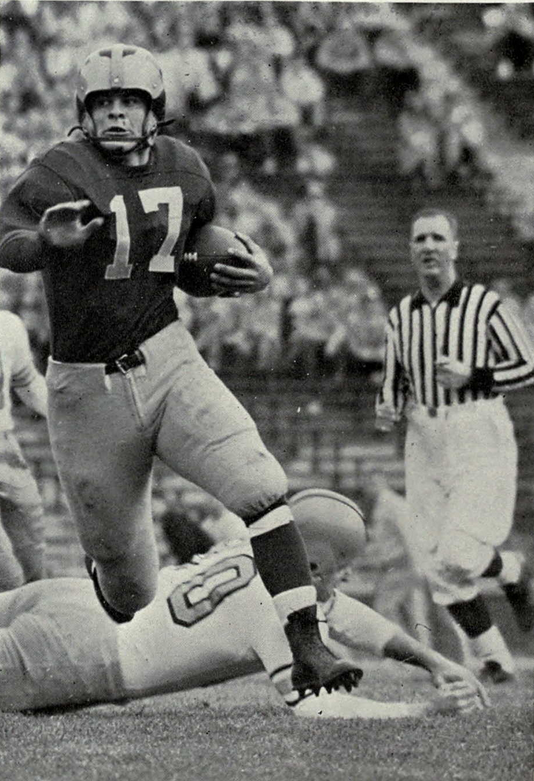
Branoff running with ball, 1953

As a sophomore in 1953, Branoff started all nine games for Michigan at the right halfback position. He also handled punting duties for the 1953 team. In the opening game of the 1953 season, Branoff ran for two touchdowns in a 50–0 win over Washington. In the second game of the season, Branoff ran for two rushing touchdowns and kicked two extra points to lead Michigan to a 26–7 victory over Tulane. At the end of October 1953, Branoff proved his value as a triple threat man as he "unreeled a spectacular 66-yard pass play" to Bob Topp. In the final game of the 1953 season, Branoff led the Wolverines to a 20–0 win over Ohio State with a career-high 113 rushing yards on 17 carries for an average of 6.7 yards per carry. Branoff outgained all five Ohio State backs in the game, and also scored a touchdown on an interception return against Ohio State.

Branoff was the Wolverines' leading rusher in 1953 with 527 yards (averaging 5.2 yards per carry) and their leading scorer with 39 points (6 touchdowns and 3 extra points). Branoff also added 151 receiving yards and 1 receiving touchdown, 113 passing yards and 1 passing touchdown, 130 yards on kickoff returns, and 90 yards on punt returns. At the end of the 1953 season, Branoff was selected as the team's Most Valuable Player. His selection marked the first time that a sophomore was selected for Michigan's Most Valuable Player award.

=== 1954 season ===
As a junior in 1954, Branoff was slowed by a knee injury. He played in the first two games of the season, but gained only 28 yards in 10 carries. He did not play in the Iowa and Northwestern games. Head coach Bennie Oosterbaan said the loss of Branoff would be "a big blow" but noted that he would not permit Branoff to play against Iowa because, "we'd rather lose all our games this season than have him injured for the rest of his life. His bad knee will heal all right if we give him enough time to rest." Branoff attempted to come back from the injury in Michigan's homecoming game against Minnesota, gaining 38 yards on 6 carries and scoring his only touchdown of the 1954 season. The Chicago Daily Tribune described Branoff's performance against Minnesota as follows:

"For the brief visits he made to the workyard, Tony Branoff, senior right half back who has been plagued with an ailing knee most of the season, was outstanding. Tony scored the first touchdown on successive smashes on 9 and 4 yards in the first quarter."

Branoff carried the ball only twice the following week against Indiana. In early November 1954, Branoff hospitalized due to his injured knee, and Michigan coach Oosterbaan announced that Branoff was lost for the season. Branoff believes he was the first football player to receive an injection of cortisone. However, the cortisone did not resolve the cartilage problem in his knee, and he underwent knee surgery after the 1954 season.

=== 1955 season ===
As a senior in 1955, Branoff returned to the lineup, starting all 9 games for the Wolverines at the right halfback position. However, his mobility was limited because his knees were so heavily taped. He later recalled, "I was not the fastest player in the world, so I had to rely on being shifty. But you sort of lose your speed after you have operations and your knees need to be taped."

At the end of October 1953, Branoff helped lead the Wolverines to a come-from-behind win against Iowa. Iowa led 21-13 in the fourth quarter, but Michigan scored three touchdowns in the final nine minutes of the game. Branoff scored the final touchdown on a play described by the Chicago Daily Tribune as follows: "Tony Branoff, whose knees are wrapped like an Egyptian's mummy's, rounded out a fine performance with a 31 yard touchdown run that was only so much frosting on this triumph."

In early November 1955, Michigan lost its first game to Illinois by a score of 25-6. Branoff scored Michigan's only points with a 17-yard touchdown run in the second quarter and compiled 105 rushing yards on 17 carries for an average of 6.1 yards per carry.

Despite the reduced mobility, Branoff was Michigan’s rushing leader for the second time in three years with 387 rushing yards, an average of 4.5 yards per carry, and 3 rushing touchdowns. After the 1955 season, Branoff was selected by the United Press as a first-team All-Big Ten halfback. He was also selected to play in the East–West Shrine Game and scored a touchdown on a 7-yard run left end run in the fourth quarter.

== Professional football ==
Branoff was selected by the Chicago Cardinals in the 23rd round of the 1956 NFL draft and signed with the Cardinals in May 1956. He was also offered $16,000 to play in the Canadian Football League, but he chose not to play professional football, because of worry over the condition of his knees. He eventually had both knees replaced at age 65.

== Later life ==
After graduating from Michigan, Branoff worked in sales for 10 years. In 1966, he accepted a job with Cushing-Malloy book printers in Ann Arbor. He remained with the company for 37 years, retiring in 2003.

In June 1956, Branoff was married to Marilyn Jane Frankensteen, daughter of former United Auto Workers leader Richard T. Frankensteen. Branoff and his wife had three sons, Anthony Branoff, Jr., and twins, Terry and Timothy. He was divorced from his wife in 1972 and did not remarry.

Branoff died at his home in Saline, Michigan on December 20, 2012, at the age of 78. He was buried at the Sunset Hills Cemetery in Flint.
