= 1953 Iowa State Cyclones football team =

American college football season

1953 Iowa State Cyclones football
- Conference: Big Seven Conference
- Record: 2–7 (1–5 Big 7)
- Head coach: Abe Stuber (7th season)
- Captains: Jack Lessin; Jim Rawley
- Home stadium: Clyde Williams Field

1953 Big Seven Conference football standings
| | Conf. | | | | | Overall |
| Team | W | | L | | T | W | | L | | T |
|---|---|---|---|---|---|---|---|---|---|---|
| No. 4 Oklahoma $ | 6 | – | 0 | – | 0 | 9 | – | 1 | – | 1 |
| Missouri | 4 | – | 2 | – | 0 | 6 | – | 4 | – | 0 |
| Kansas State | 4 | – | 2 | – | 0 | 6 | – | 3 | – | 1 |
| Colorado | 2 | – | 4 | – | 0 | 6 | – | 4 | – | 0 |
| Nebraska | 2 | – | 4 | – | 0 | 3 | – | 6 | – | 1 |
| Kansas | 2 | – | 4 | – | 0 | 2 | – | 8 | – | 0 |
| Iowa State | 1 | – | 5 | – | 0 | 2 | – | 7 | – | 0 |
$ – Conference champion; Rankings from AP Poll

The 1953 Iowa State Cyclones football team represented Iowa State College of Agricultural and Mechanic Arts (later renamed Iowa State University) in the Big Seven Conference during the 1953 college football season. In their seventh and final year under head coach Abe Stuber, the Cyclones compiled a 2–7 record (1–5 against conference opponents), finished in last place in the conference, and were outscored by their opponents by a combined total of 211 to 120. They played their home games at Clyde Williams Field in Ames, Iowa.

The team's regular starting lineup on offense consisted of left end Barney Alleman, left tackle Ralph Brown, left guard Bill Wilson, center Jim Rawley, right guard Gean Kowalski, right tackle Jack Lessin, right end Kim Tidd, quarterback Bill Plantan, left halfback Dan Rice, right halfback Dick Cox, and fullback Max Burkett. Jack Lessin and Jim Rawley were the team captains.

The team's statistical leaders included Max Burkett with 342 rushing yards, Bill Plantan with 723 passing yards and 41 points (five touchdowns and 11 extra points), and Gary Lutz with 249 receiving yards. Max Burkett was selected as a first-team all-conference player.

== Schedule ==
| Date | Time | Opponent | Site | Result | Attendance | Source |
|---|---|---|---|---|---|---|
| September 19 | 2:00 pm | South Dakota* | Clyde Williams Field; Ames, IA | W 35–0 | 9,986–11,000 | |
| September 26 | 1:30 pm | at Northwestern* | Dyche Stadium; Evanston, IL | L 0–35 | 37,960 | |
| October 3 | 2:00 pm | at Kansas | Memorial Stadium; Lawrence, KS | L 0–23 | 23,676 | |
| October 10 | 2:00 pm | Kansas State | Clyde Williams Field; Ames, IA (rivalry) | L 12–20 | 8,037 | |
| October 17 | 2:00 pm | Missouri^{†} | Clyde Williams Field; Ames, IA (rivalry) | W 13–6 | 12,486 | |
| October 24 | 2:00 pm | at Drake* | Drake Stadium; Des Moines, IA | L 7–12 | 5,648–7,500 | |
| October 31 | 3:00 pm | at Colorado | Folsom Field; Boulder, CO | L 34–41 | 22,136 | |
| November 7 | 2:00 pm | Nebraska | Clyde Williams Field; Ames, IA (rivalry) | L 19–27 | 12,116 | |
| November 14 | 2:00 pm | at No. 6 Oklahoma | Oklahoma Memorial Stadium; Norman, OK | L 0–47 | 43,713 | |
*Non-conference game; ^{†}Homecoming; Rankings from AP Poll released prior to the game; All times are in Central time
