= 1953 Colorado Buffaloes football team =

American college football season

1953 Colorado Buffaloes football
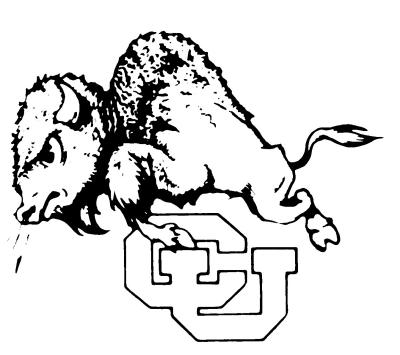
- Conference: Big Seven Conference
- Record: 6–4 (2–4 Big 7)
- Head coach: Dallas Ward (6th season)
- Captain: Game captains
- Home stadium: Folsom Field

1953 Big Seven Conference football standings
	Conf.					Overall
Team	W		L		T	W		L		T
No. 4 Oklahoma $	6	–	0	–	0	9	–	1	–	1
Missouri	4	–	2	–	0	6	–	4	–	0
Kansas State	4	–	2	–	0	6	–	3	–	1
Colorado	2	–	4	–	0	6	–	4	–	0
Nebraska	2	–	4	–	0	3	–	6	–	1
Kansas	2	–	4	–	0	2	–	8	–	0
Iowa State	1	–	5	–	0	2	–	7	–	0
$ – Conference champion; Rankings from AP Poll

The 1953 Colorado Buffaloes football team was an American football team that represented the University of Colorado as a member of the Big Seven Conference during the 1953 college football season. Led by sixth-year head coach Dallas Ward, the Buffaloes compiled an overall record of 6–4 with a mark of 2–4 in conference play, tying for fourth place in the Big 7. The team played its home games on campus at Folsom Field in Boulder, Colorado.

Colorado responded from four straight losses in the middle of season to finish with four straight victories, including wins over rivals Utah and Colorado A&M.

== Schedule ==
Date	Opponent	Site	Result	Attendance	Source
September 19	at Washington*	Husky Stadium; Seattle, WA	W 21–20	31,792	
September 26	Arizona*	Folsom Field; Boulder, CO	W 20–14	24,500	
October 3	Missouri	Folsom Field; Boulder, CO	L 16–27	23,840	
October 10	Kansas	Folsom Field; Boulder, CO	L 21–27	24,300	
October 17	at Kansas State	Memorial Stadium; Manhattan, KS (rivalry)	L 14–28	14,000	
October 24	at No. 9 Oklahoma	Oklahoma Memorial Stadium; Norman, OK	L 20–27	36,565	
October 31	Iowa State^{†}	Folsom Field; Boulder, CO	W 41–34	22,500	
November 7	Utah*	Folsom Field; Boulder, CO (rivalry)	W 21–0	18,500	
November 14	at Nebraska	Memorial Stadium; Lincoln, NE (rivalry)	W 14–10	36,000	
November 28	at Colorado A&M*	Colorado Field; Fort Collins, CO (rivalry)	W 13–7	7,549	
*Non-conference game; ^{†}Homecoming; Rankings from AP Poll released prior to the game

== Awards ==
- All-Big Seven (AP, UPI, Coaches): E Gary Knafelc

== NFL draft ==
Senior end Gary Knafelc was taken in the second round of the 1954 NFL draft with 14th overall pick by the Chicago Cardinals. He played ten seasons in the NFL, mostly with the Green Bay Packers.
