= 1953 Purdue Boilermakers football team =

American college football season

1953 Purdue Boilermakers football
- Conference: Big Ten Conference
- Record: 2–7 (2–4 Big Ten)
- Head coach: Stu Holcomb (7th season)
- MVP: Tom Bettis
- Captains: Tom Bettis; John Kerr
- Home stadium: Ross–Ade Stadium

1953 Big Ten Conference football standings
	Conf.					Overall
Team	W		L		T	W		L		T
No. 3 Michigan State +	5	–	1	–	0	9	–	1	–	0
No. 7 Illinois +	5	–	1	–	0	7	–	1	–	1
No. 15 Wisconsin	4	–	1	–	1	6	–	2	–	1
Ohio State	4	–	3	–	0	6	–	3	–	0
Minnesota	3	–	3	–	1	4	–	4	–	1
No. 20 Michigan	3	–	3	–	0	6	–	3	–	0
No. 9 Iowa	3	–	3	–	0	5	–	3	–	1
Purdue	2	–	4	–	0	2	–	7	–	0
Indiana	1	–	5	–	0	2	–	7	–	0
Northwestern	0	–	6	–	0	3	–	6	–	0
+ – Conference co-champions; Rankings from AP Poll

The 1953 Purdue Boilermakers football team was an American football team that represented Purdue University during the 1953 Big Ten Conference football season. In their seventh season under head coach Stu Holcomb, the Boilermakers compiled a 2–7 record, finished in eighth place in the Big Ten Conference with a 2–4 record against conference opponents, and were outscored by their opponents by a total of 167 to 89.

Notable players on the 1953 Purdue team included guard Tom Bettis.

== Schedule ==
Date	Opponent	Site	Result	Attendance	Source
September 26	at Missouri*	Faurot Field; Columbia, MO	L 7–14	19,000	
October 3	No. 1 Notre Dame*	Ross–Ade Stadium; West Lafayette, IN (rivalry)	L 7–37	49,135	
October 10	at No. 8 Duke*	Duke Stadium; Durham, NC	L 14–20	30,000	
October 17	Wisconsin^{†}	Ross–Ade Stadium; West Lafayette, IN	L 19–28	36,000–36,500	
October 24	No. 2 Michigan State	Ross–Ade Stadium; West Lafayette, IN	W 6–0	35,000	
October 31	at No. 4 Illinois	Memorial Stadium; Champaign, IL (rivalry)	L 0–21	57,210	
November 7	Iowa	Ross–Ade Stadium; West Lafayette, IN	L 0–26	35,000	
November 14	at Ohio State	Ohio Stadium; Columbus, OH	L 6–21	77,465	
November 21	at Indiana	Memorial Stadium; Bloomington, IN (Old Oaken Bucket)	W 30–0	33,000	
*Non-conference game; ^{†}Homecoming; Rankings from AP Poll released prior to the game

== Roster ==
- Tom Bettis, OL
- Rex Brock, RB
- Walt Cudzik, OL
- Roy Evans, QB
- Froncie Gutman, QB
- Karl Herkommer, RB
- Walt Houston, OL
- John Kerr, WR
- Glenn Knecht, OL
- Joe Krupa, OL
- Ed Neves, RB
- Raymond Pacer, OL
- Frank Paparazzo, OL
- Tom Redinger, WR
- Jim Reichert, RB
- Max Schmaling, RB
- Dick Skibinski, OL
- Bob Springer, WR
- Jim Wojciehowski, WR
- Ed Zembal, RB
- Len Zyzda, WR
