= 1953 Missouri Tigers football team =

American college football season

1953 Missouri Tigers football
- Conference: Big Seven Conference
- Record: 6–4 (4–2 Big 7)
- Head coach: Don Faurot (16th season)
- Home stadium: Memorial Stadium

1953 Big Seven Conference football standings
| | Conf. | | | | | Overall |
| Team | W | | L | | T | W | | L | | T |
|---|---|---|---|---|---|---|---|---|---|---|
| No. 4 Oklahoma $ | 6 | – | 0 | – | 0 | 9 | – | 1 | – | 1 |
| Missouri | 4 | – | 2 | – | 0 | 6 | – | 4 | – | 0 |
| Kansas State | 4 | – | 2 | – | 0 | 6 | – | 3 | – | 1 |
| Colorado | 2 | – | 4 | – | 0 | 6 | – | 4 | – | 0 |
| Nebraska | 2 | – | 4 | – | 0 | 3 | – | 6 | – | 1 |
| Kansas | 2 | – | 4 | – | 0 | 2 | – | 8 | – | 0 |
| Iowa State | 1 | – | 5 | – | 0 | 2 | – | 7 | – | 0 |
$ – Conference champion; Rankings from AP Poll

The 1953 Missouri Tigers football team was an American football team that represented the University of Missouri in the Big Seven Conference (Big 7) during the 1953 college football season. The team compiled a 6–4 record (4–2 against Big 7 opponents), finished in a tie for second place in the Big 7, and outscored its opponents by a combined total of 130 to 116. Don Faurot was the head coach for the 16th of 19 seasons. The team played its home games at Memorial Stadium in Columbia, Missouri.

The team's statistical leaders included Robert Bauman with 405 rushing yards, Vic Eaton with 364 passing yards and 683 yards of total offense, Elmer Corpeny with 179 receiving yards, and Bob Schoonmaker with 36 points scored.

== Schedule ==
| Date | Opponent | Site | Result | Attendance | Source |
|---|---|---|---|---|---|
| September 19 | No. 9 Maryland* | Memorial Stadium; Columbia, MO | L 6–20 | 21,000 | |
| September 26 | Purdue* | Memorial Stadium; Columbia, MO | W 14–7 | 19,000 | |
| October 3 | at Colorado | Folsom Field; Boulder, CO | W 27–16 | 23,840 | |
| October 9 | at SMU* | Cotton Bowl; Dallas, TX | L 7–20 | 35,000 | |
| October 17 | at Iowa State | Clyde Williams Field; Ames, IA (rivalry) | L 6–13 | 12,486 | |
| October 24 | Nebraska | Memorial Stadium; Columbia, MO (rivalry) | W 23–7 | 26,500 | |
| October 31 | at Indiana* | Memorial Stadium; Bloomington, IN | W 14–7 | | |
| November 7 | No. 8 Oklahoma | Memorial Stadium; Columbia, MO (rivalry) | L 7–14 | 30,020 | |
| November 14 | Kansas State | Memorial Stadium; Columbia, MO | W 16–6 | | |
| November 21 | at Kansas | Memorial Stadium; Lawrence, KS (Border War) | W 10–6 | 34,000 | |
*Non-conference game; Rankings from AP Poll released prior to the game
