= 1953 All-Big Ten Conference football team =

American college football all-star team

The 1953 All-Big Ten Conference football team consists of American football players chosen by the Associated Press (AP) and the United Press (UP) as the best players at their positions during the 1953 Big Ten Conference football season. The UP team was selected by the Big Ten head coaches.

The 1953 Michigan State Spartans football team, under head coach Clarence Munn, tied for the Big Ten championship and placed two on the first team: end Don Dohoney (AP-1, UP-1) and back Leroy Bolden (AP-1, UP-1).

The 1953 Illinois Fighting Illini football team tied for the conference championship and also placed two on the first team: back J. C. Caroline (AP-1, UP-1) and guard Jan Smid (AP-1, UP-1).

Minnesota quarterback Paul Giel was a consensus first-team All-American and received the Chicago Tribune Silver Football as the Big Ten's most valuable player for the second consecutive year.

== All-Big Ten selections ==
=== Ends ===
- Don Dohoney, Michigan State (AP-1, UP-1)
- Bob Topp, Michigan (AP-1, UP-1)
- Rocky Ryan, Illinois (AP-2)
- William Fenton, Iowa (AP-2)
- Ron Locklin, Wisconsin (UP-2)
- Tom Hague, Ohio State (UP-2)
- Joe Collier, Northwestern (UP-3)
- Norb Esser, Wisconsin (UP-3)

=== Tackles ===
- George Jacoby, Ohio State (AP-1, UP-1)
- Cal Jones, Iowa (AP-1, UP-2 [g])
- Stavros Canakes, Minnesota (AP-2, UP-1)
- Harry Jagielski, Indiana (AP-2, UP-3)
- Bob Lenzini, Illinois (UP-2)
- Randy Schrecengost, Michigan State (UP-2)
- Don Chelf, Iowa (UP-3)

=== Guards ===
- Jan Smid, Illinois (AP-1, UP-1)
- Tom Bettis, Purdue (AP-1, UP-1)
- Ferris Hallmark, Michigan State (AP-2)
- Michael Takacs, Ohio State (AP-2, UP-2)
- John Bauer, Illinois (UP-3)
- John Dixon, Wisconsin (UP-3)

=== Centers ===
- Jerry Hilgenberg, Iowa (AP-1, UP-1)
- Jerry Helgeson, Minnesota (AP-2, UP-2)
- Gary Messner, Wisconsin (UP-3)

=== Backs ===
- Paul Giel, Minnesota (AP-1, UP-1)
- J. C. Caroline, Illinois (AP-1, UP-1)
- Leroy Bolden, Michigan State (AP-1, UP-1)
- Alan Ameche, Wisconsin (AP-1, UP-1)
- Tom Yewcic, Michigan State (AP-2)
- Howard Cassady, Ohio State (AP-2, UP-2)
- Mickey Bates, Illinois (AP-2, UP-2)
- Bobby Watkins, Ohio State (AP-2, UP-2)
- John Borton, Ohio State (UP-2)
- Florian Helinski, Indiana (UP-3)
- Billy Wells, Michigan State (UP-3)
- Evan Slonac, Michigan State (UP-3)
- Dusty Rice, Iowa (UP-3)

== Key ==
AP = Associated Press, chosen by conference coaches

UP = United Press = United Press selected by the conference's head coaches

Bold = Consensus first-team selection of the AP and UP

== See also ==
- 1953 College Football All-America Team
