= 1953 Minnesota Golden Gophers football team =

American college football season

1953 Minnesota Golden Gophers football
- Conference: Big Ten Conference
- Record: 4–4–1 (3–3–1 Big Ten)
- Head coach: Wes Fesler (3rd season)
- MVP: Paul Giel
- Captain: Paul Giel
- Home stadium: Memorial Stadium

1953 Big Ten Conference football standings
| | Conf. | | | | | Overall |
| Team | W | | L | | T | W | | L | | T |
|---|---|---|---|---|---|---|---|---|---|---|
| No. 3 Michigan State + | 5 | – | 1 | – | 0 | 9 | – | 1 | – | 0 |
| No. 7 Illinois + | 5 | – | 1 | – | 0 | 7 | – | 1 | – | 1 |
| No. 15 Wisconsin | 4 | – | 1 | – | 1 | 6 | – | 2 | – | 1 |
| Ohio State | 4 | – | 3 | – | 0 | 6 | – | 3 | – | 0 |
| Minnesota | 3 | – | 3 | – | 1 | 4 | – | 4 | – | 1 |
| No. 20 Michigan | 3 | – | 3 | – | 0 | 6 | – | 3 | – | 0 |
| No. 9 Iowa | 3 | – | 3 | – | 0 | 5 | – | 3 | – | 1 |
| Purdue | 2 | – | 4 | – | 0 | 2 | – | 7 | – | 0 |
| Indiana | 1 | – | 5 | – | 0 | 2 | – | 7 | – | 0 |
| Northwestern | 0 | – | 6 | – | 0 | 3 | – | 6 | – | 0 |
+ – Conference co-champions; Rankings from AP Poll

The 1953 Minnesota Golden Gophers football team represented the University of Minnesota in the 1953 Big Ten Conference football season. In their third year under head coach Wes Fesler, the Golden Gophers compiled a 4–4–1 record and were outscored by their opponents by a combined total of 160 to 150.

Halfback Paul Giel was named an All-American by the Associated Press, Football Writers Association of America (FWAA), Look, Walter Camp Football Foundation and American Football Coaches Association (AFCA). He received Chicago Tribune Silver Football, awarded to the most valuable player of the Big Ten, and was named All-Big Ten first team. Giel finished second in voting for the Heisman Trophy, receiving the most points for a player not to win the award. He was also awarded the Team MVP Award.

Total attendance for the season was 293,313, which averaged to 58,662. The season high for attendance was against Michigan.

== Schedule ==
| Date | Opponent | Rank | Site | Result | Attendance | Source |
|---|---|---|---|---|---|---|
| September 26 | at No. 8 USC* | | Los Angeles Memorial Coliseum; Los Angeles, CA | L 7–17 | 66,698 | |
| October 3 | No. 2 Michigan State | | Memorial Stadium; Minneapolis, MN | L 0–21 | 60,995 | |
| October 10 | at No. 18 Northwestern | | Dyche Stadium; Evanston, IL | W 30–13 | 40,000 | |
| October 17 | at No. 9 Illinois | | Memorial Stadium; Champaign, IL | L 7–27 | 55,641 | |
| October 24 | No. 5 Michigan | | Memorial Stadium; Minneapolis, MN (Little Brown Jug) | W 22–0 | 62,795 | |
| October 31 | Pittsburgh* | No. 14 | Memorial Stadium; Minneapolis, MN | W 35–14 | 49,092 | |
| November 7 | Indiana^{†} | No. 13 | Memorial Stadium; Minneapolis, MN | W 28–20 | 58,527–59,486 | |
| November 14 | at Iowa | No. 15 | Iowa Stadium; Iowa City, IA (rivalry) | L 0–27 | 55,355 | |
| November 21 | No. 8 Wisconsin | | Memorial Stadium; Minneapolis, MN (rivalry) | T 21–21 | 61,904 | |
*Non-conference game; ^{†}Homecoming; Rankings from AP Poll released prior to the game

== Roster ==
- Gino Cappelletti #15
- HB Paul Giel
