= 1953 Wisconsin Badgers football team =

American college football season

1953 Wisconsin Badgers football
- Conference: Big Ten Conference

Ranking
- Coaches: No. 14
- AP: No. 15
- Record: 6–2–1 (4–1–1 Big Ten)
- Head coach: Ivy Williamson (5th season)
- MVP: Alan Ameche
- Captains: Roger Dornburg; Jerry Wuhrman
- Home stadium: Camp Randall Stadium

1953 Big Ten Conference football standings
	Conf.					Overall
Team	W		L		T	W		L		T
No. 3 Michigan State +	5	–	1	–	0	9	–	1	–	0
No. 7 Illinois +	5	–	1	–	0	7	–	1	–	1
No. 15 Wisconsin	4	–	1	–	1	6	–	2	–	1
Ohio State	4	–	3	–	0	6	–	3	–	0
Minnesota	3	–	3	–	1	4	–	4	–	1
No. 20 Michigan	3	–	3	–	0	6	–	3	–	0
No. 9 Iowa	3	–	3	–	0	5	–	3	–	1
Purdue	2	–	4	–	0	2	–	7	–	0
Indiana	1	–	5	–	0	2	–	7	–	0
Northwestern	0	–	6	–	0	3	–	6	–	0
+ – Conference co-champions; Rankings from AP Poll

The 1953 Wisconsin Badgers football team represented the University of Wisconsin in the 1953 Big Ten Conference football season. Led by fifth-year head coach Ivy Williamson, the Badgers compiled an overall record of 6–2–1 with a mark of 4–1–1 in conference play, placing third in the Big Ten.

== Schedule ==
Date	Opponent	Rank	Site	Result	Attendance
September 26	Penn State*		Camp Randall Stadium; Madison, WI	W 20–0	48,374
October 3	Marquette*	No. 16	Camp Randall Stadium; Madison, WI	W 13–11	51,363
October 9	at No. 6 UCLA*		Los Angeles Memorial Coliseum; Los Angeles, CA	L 0–13	52,887
October 17	at Purdue		Ross–Ade Stadium; West Lafayette, IN	W 28–19	36,000–36,500
October 24	Ohio State		Camp Randall Stadium; Madison, WI	L 19–20	52,819
October 31	Iowa^{†}		Camp Randall Stadium; Madison, WI (rivalry)	W 10–6	52,819
November 7	at Northwestern		Dyche Stadium; Evanston, IL	W 34–13	40,000
November 14	No. 3 Illinois		Camp Randall Stadium; Madison, WI	W 34–7	52,887
November 21	at Minnesota	No. 8	Memorial Stadium; Minneapolis, MN (rivalry)	T 21–21	61,154
*Non-conference game; ^{†}Homecoming; Rankings from AP Poll released prior to the game

== Team players in the 1954 NFL draft ==
Player	Position	Round	Pick	NFL club
Wendell Gulseth	Tackle	12	132	New York Giants
Roger Dornburg	Back	13	152	Washington Redskins
Jerry Witt	Back	19	224	Washington Redskins
Jim Haluska	Back	30	354	Chicago Bears
