= 1953 Oklahoma Sooners football team =

American college football season

1953 Oklahoma Sooners football

National champion (B(QPRS), CFRA) Big 7 champion Orange Bowl champion

Orange Bowl, W 7–0 vs. Maryland
- Conference: Big Seven Conference

Ranking
- Coaches: No. 5
- AP: No. 4
- Record: 9–1–1 (6–0 Big 7)
- Head coach: Bud Wilkinson (7th season)
- Captains: Larry Grigg; Roger Nelson
- Home stadium: Oklahoma Memorial Stadium

1953 Big Seven Conference football standings
	Conf.					Overall
Team	W		L		T	W		L		T
No. 4 Oklahoma $	6	–	0	–	0	9	–	1	–	1
Missouri	4	–	2	–	0	6	–	4	–	0
Kansas State	4	–	2	–	0	6	–	3	–	1
Colorado	2	–	4	–	0	6	–	4	–	0
Nebraska	2	–	4	–	0	3	–	6	–	1
Kansas	2	–	4	–	0	2	–	8	–	0
Iowa State	1	–	5	–	0	2	–	7	–	0
$ – Conference champion; Rankings from AP Poll

The 1953 Oklahoma Sooners football team represented the University of Oklahoma during the 1953 college football season. Led by seventh-year head coach Bud Wilkinson, they played their home games at Oklahoma Memorial Stadium in Norman, Oklahoma, and were members of the Big Seven Conference.

The Sooners dropped their opener at home to top-ranked Notre Dame, tied at Pittsburgh, then won nine straight, concluding with a 7–0 shutout of #1 Maryland in the Orange Bowl in Miami on New Year's Day and were named national champions by Berryman. The final polls were released in late November, prior to the bowl games.

Oklahoma's initial win of the 1953 season, over Texas in Dallas on October 10, was the start of their record 47-game winning streak that extended more than four years, until November 1957.

== Schedule ==
Date	Opponent	Rank	Site	Result	Attendance	Source
September 26	No. 1 Notre Dame*	No. 6	Oklahoma Memorial Stadium; Norman, OK	L 21–28	59,461	
October 3	at Pittsburgh*	No. 8	Pitt Stadium; Pittsburgh, PA	T 7–7	28,152	
October 10	vs. No. 15 Texas*	No. 16	Cotton Bowl; Dallas, TX (rivalry)	W 19–14	75,504	
October 17	Kansas	No. 12	Oklahoma Memorial Stadium; Norman, OK	W 45–0	45,862	
October 24	Colorado	No. 9	Oklahoma Memorial Stadium; Norman, OK	W 27–20	36,565	
October 31	at Kansas State	No. 9	Memorial Stadium; Manhattan, KS	W 34–0	23,822	
November 7	at Missouri	No. 8	Memorial Stadium; Columbia, MO (rivalry)	W 14–7	30,020	
November 14	Iowa State	No. 6	Oklahoma Memorial Stadium; Norman, OK	W 47–0	43,713	
November 21	at Nebraska	No. 4	Memorial Stadium; Lincoln, NE (rivalry)	W 30–7	31,551	
November 28	Oklahoma A&M*	No. 4	Oklahoma Memorial Stadium; Norman, OK (Bedlam)	W 42–7	50,524	
January 1, 1954	vs. No. 1 Maryland*	No. 4	Burdine Stadium; Miami, FL (Orange Bowl)	W 7–0	68,640–68,718	
*Non-conference game; Rankings from AP Poll released prior to the game

== Rankings ==
Ranking movements Legend: ██ Increase in ranking ██ Decrease in ranking ( ) = First-place votes
	Week										
Poll	Pre	1	2	3	4	5	6	7	8	9	Final
AP	6 (3)	8	16	12 (1)	9	9 (1)	8 (1)	6 (1)	4 (3)	4 (9)	4 (10)

== Roster ==
- G J. D. Roberts, Sr.
- E Carl Allison, Jr.

== NFL draft ==
The following players were drafted into the National Football League following the season.

Round	Pick	Player	Position	NFL team
2	16	Larry Grigg	Back	Baltimore Colts
10	116	Merrill Green	Back	Washington Redskins
14	164	Roger Nelson	Tackle	Washington Redskins
17	195	J. D. Roberts	Guard	Green Bay Packers
30	355	Juel Sweatte	Back	Pittsburgh Steelers
