= Bob Topp =

American football player (1932–2017)

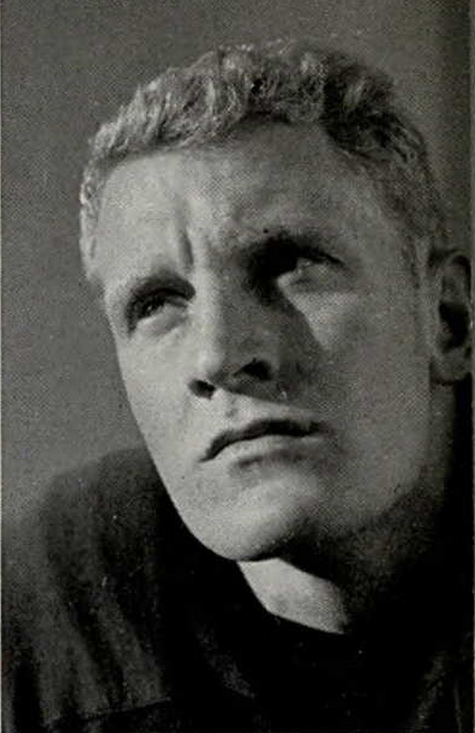
- Topp in 1953

No. 87
- Position: End

Personal information
- Born: April 22, 1932; Kalamazoo, Michigan, U.S.
- Died: April 4, 2017 (aged 84); Saugatuck, Michigan, U.S.
- Listed height: 6 ft 2 in (1.88 m)
- Listed weight: 190 lb (86 kg)

Career information
- College: Michigan

Career history
- Univ. of Michigan 1952–1953; New York Giants 1954, 1956

Awards and highlights
- First-team All-Big Ten (1953)

Career statistics
- Receiving yards (college): 390
- Receiving yards (NFL): 90
- Touchdowns (NFL): 3
- Stats at Pro Football Reference

Eugene Robert Topp (April 22, 1932 – April 4, 2017) was an American football player. He played college football for the University of Michigan from 1952 to 1953 under head coach Bennie Oosterbaan. In 1953, he was selected as a first-team All-Big Ten Conference end by both the Associated Press and the United Press. He played professional football for the New York Giants in 1954 and 1956.

== Early life ==
Topp was born in Kalamazoo, Michigan. He was a star basketball player for Kalamazoo Central High School teams that won two state championships.

== University of Michigan ==
Topp enrolled at the University of Michigan where he studied medicine and played freshman and junior varsity football. As a junior, he qualified for the varsity and played a total of 56 minutes during the nine-game season for the 1952 team. In those games, he caught five passes for 59 yards and a touchdown. Topp did not start any games for the 1952 team.

As a senior, he impressed the coaching staff in spring practice and won the starting spot at left end. Topp was a starter at the end position for the 1953 season, starting eight games at left end and one at right end. He blocked punts that led to Michigan touchdowns in the first two games of the 1953 season against Washington and Tulane. His longest gain was a 66-yard touchdown catch against Penn on October 31, 1953. Against Iowa on October 10, 1953, he caught 7 passes for 111 yards. He was only the second Michigan receiver to accumulate 100 receiving yards in a single game; Lowell Perry first accomplished the feat in 1951.

At the end of the 1953 season, Topp was selected by both the Associated Press and the United Press as a first-team All-Big Ten Conference player.

In two seasons with the Wolverines' varsity, Topp caught 28 passes for 390 yards (13.9 yards per catch) and three touchdowns.

== Professional football ==
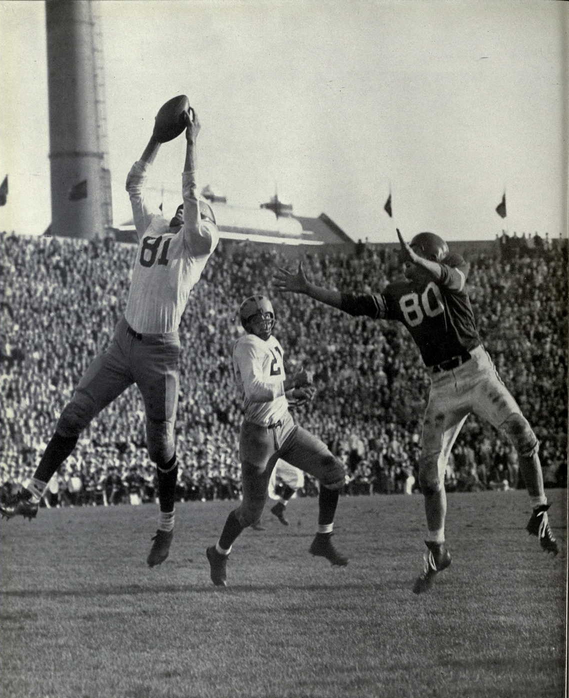
Topp makes a leaping catch against Michigan State, 1953

Topp was drafted by the New York Giants in the 13th round (148th overall pick) of the 1954 NFL draft. He signed with the Giants in February 1954, and played in six games for the team during the 1954 NFL season. He had six receptions for 90 yards and three touchdowns in 1954.

After the 1954 season, Topp was inducted into the United States Air Force and missed the 1955 season. In March 1956, the Giants signed Topp to a contract for the 1956 season. In October 1956, the Giants upset the Cleveland Browns, 21-9, after intercepting the radio signals being used by the Browns to relay plays from the bench to a small receiver inside the quarterback's helmet. There was no rule prohibiting the practice at the time, and Giants' general manager Ray Walsh boasted to the press about their success. Walsh told the press that Topp was on the bench with a receiving set listening to the signals coming from the Browns' bench. Topp was able to hear the signals more clearly than the Browns' quarterback and relayed them to assistant coach Tom Landry, who then relayed them to the defensive unit on the field.

== Life after football ==
Bob Topp returned home to Michigan after his retirement from professional football. He joined his brother Elwin's medical practice at William Crispe Hospital in Plainwell, Michigan (later renamed Pipp Community Hospital) where the two brothers worked together for several decades as pediatricians.
