= Billy Wells (American football) =

American football player (1931–2001)

No. 41, 24, 27
- Position: Halfback

Personal information
- Born: December 7, 1931; Menominee, Michigan, U.S.
- Died: December 25, 2001 (aged 70); Altadena, California, U.S.
- Listed height: 5 ft 9 in (1.75 m)
- Listed weight: 180 lb (82 kg)

Career information
- High school: Menominee
- College: Michigan State (1950–1953)
- NFL draft: 1954: 5th round, 55th overall pick

Career history
- Washington Redskins (1954–1957); Pittsburgh Steelers (1957); Philadelphia Eagles (1958); Boston Patriots (1960)

Awards and highlights
- Pro Bowl (1954); National champion (1952); 1954 Rose Bowl MVP

Career NFL/AFL statistics
- Rushing yards: 1,384
- Rushing average: 3.8
- Receptions: 57
- Receiving yards: 725
- Total touchdowns: 9
- Stats at Pro Football Reference

William Prescott Wells (December 7, 1931 – December 25, 2001) was an American professional football player who was a halfback in the National Football League (NFL) and American Football League (AFL). He played college football for the Michigan State Spartans from 1951 to 1954. Wells played in the NFL for the Washington Redskins (1954, 1956-1957), Pittsburgh Steelers (1957), and the Philadelphia Eagles (1958). He played in the AFL for the Boston Patriots (1960).

== Early life ==
Wells was born in 1931 in Menominee, Michigan. He spent several years in California as a child while his mother worked as a cartoonist for Disney Productions. The family then returned to Menominee. He began playing football in the seventh grade. He led the Menominee Maroons to a three-year record of 19-4-1.

== Michigan State ==
He enrolled at Michigan State College, where he played college football from 1951 to 1954. In his three years as a starter, the Spartans won national championships in 1951 (9-0) and 1952 (9-0) and a Big Ten and Rose Bowl championship with a 9-1 record in 1953. Wells gained 1,293 rushing yards for an average of 5.4 yars per carry. In the 1954 Rose Bowl, he led Michigan State to a comeback from a 14-7 halftime deficit, leading a third-quarter touchdown drive and scoring the game's final points on a 62-yard punt return.

== Professional football ==
Wells was selected by the Washington Redskins in the fifth round, 56th overall pick, in the 1954 NFL draft. As a rookie, he started all games at right halfback, tallying 516 yards on 100 carries for an average of 5.2 yards per carry. He also had 19 pass receptions for 295 yards. After the 1954 season, he was chosen to play in the Pro Bowl, was also named the Redskins' outstanding player for 1954, and finished second in voting for NFL rookie of the year.

Wells missed the 1955 NFL season while serving in the Air Force. He played on the Bolling Air Force Base during the fall of 1955.

Wells returned to the Redskins in November 1956. He started all seven of the remaining games, tallying 185 rushing yards and 86 receiving yards.

Wells returned to Washington in 1957, but was traded to the Pittsburgh Steelers after only one game. He appeared in 10 games for the Steelers, tallying 532 rushing yards and 89 receiving yards.

He attempted a comeback with the San Diego Chargers but announced his retirement in August 1960. He then joined the Boston Patriots and appeared in 12 games during the 1960 season.

== Later life ==
After his playing career, Wells lived in Southern California, in Manhattan Beach and later Altadena. He had three children: Chris Wells, Becca Rosen, and Scottie Wells. In 1961, Wells formed a Dixieland band called Billy and His Bachelors that played at Southern California functions. Wells played banjo and sang in the band. He also acted in a few television shows, including episodes of Manhunt and Alfred Hitchcock Presents. He also owned William Wells Productions, a film company that produced movies, including "The Outlaw Legacy" starring Rory Calhoun and Marty Robbins. For a time, he also worked as a sportcaster in Chicago. He later worked as a supervisor for a security guard company.

Wells died in 2001 at age 70 at his home in Altadena, California.
