= Don Dohoney =

American football player (1932–1993)

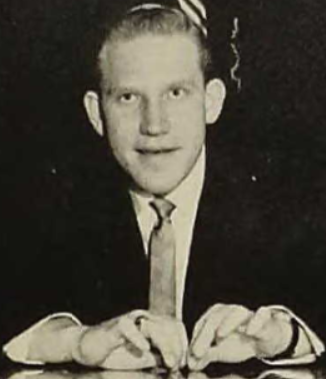
- Dohoney from "The 1954 Wolverine"

Profile
- Position: End

Personal information
- Born: March 4, 1932
- Died: July 4, 1993 (aged 61); Meridian, Michigan, U.S.

Career information
- College: Michigan State College
- NFL draft: 1954: 5th round, 50th overall pick

Career history
- 1953: Michigan St. Spartans

Awards and highlights
- Consensus All-American (1953); First-team All-Big Ten (1953)

Donald Clay Dohoney (March 4, 1932 – July 4, 1993) was an American football player. He grew up in Ann Arbor, Michigan, and played college football at Michigan State College. He played both on offense and defense at the end position, was captain of Michigan State's 1953 team that won the Big Ten Conference championship and defeated UCLA in the 1954 Rose Bowl. Dohoney was a consensus selection on the 1953 College Football All-America Team.

In March 1954, Dohoney signed with the Chicago Cardinals of the National Football League (1954). Chicago coach Joe Stydahar called Dohoney "the best defensive end developed in college ball in a great many years. He rushes the passer real good, plays the running game well and is one of the most rugged players we've seen." In June 1954, he was added to the lineup of college all-stars who played the NFL champion Detroit Lions in the annual Chicago College All-Star Game. According to records of Pro-Football-Reference.com, Dohoney did not appear in any regular season games in the NFL.

Dohoney died in 1993 at Meridian, Michigan.
