= 1953 Northwestern Wildcats football team =

American college football season

1953 Northwestern Wildcats football
- Conference: Big Ten Conference
- Record: 3–6 (0–6 Big Ten)
- Head coach: Bob Voigts (7th season)
- MVP: Bob Lauter
- Captains: Joe Collier; Dick Thomas
- Home stadium: Dyche Stadium

1953 Big Ten Conference football standings
	Conf.					Overall
Team	W		L		T	W		L		T
No. 3 Michigan State +	5	–	1	–	0	9	–	1	–	0
No. 7 Illinois +	5	–	1	–	0	7	–	1	–	1
No. 15 Wisconsin	4	–	1	–	1	6	–	2	–	1
Ohio State	4	–	3	–	0	6	–	3	–	0
Minnesota	3	–	3	–	1	4	–	4	–	1
No. 20 Michigan	3	–	3	–	0	6	–	3	–	0
No. 9 Iowa	3	–	3	–	0	5	–	3	–	1
Purdue	2	–	4	–	0	2	–	7	–	0
Indiana	1	–	5	–	0	2	–	7	–	0
Northwestern	0	–	6	–	0	3	–	6	–	0
+ – Conference co-champions; Rankings from AP Poll

The 1953 Northwestern Wildcats team represented Northwestern University during the 1953 Big Ten Conference football season. In their seventh year under head coach Bob Voigts, the Wildcats compiled a 3–6 record (0–6 against Big Ten Conference opponents), finished in last place in the Big Ten, and were outscored by their opponents by a combined total of 205 to 166.

== Schedule ==
Date	Opponent	Rank	Site	Result	Attendance
September 26	Iowa State*		Dyche Stadium; Evanston, IL	W 35–0	37,960
October 3	Army*		Dyche Stadium; Evanston, IL	W 33–20	30,000
October 10	Minnesota	No. 18	Dyche Stadium; Evanston, IL	L 13–30	40,000
October 17	at No. 5 Michigan		Michigan Stadium; Ann Arbor, MI (rivalry)	L 12–20	64,420
October 24	Pittsburgh*		Dyche Stadium; Evanston, IL	W 27–21	28,000
October 31	at Ohio State		Ohio Stadium; Columbus, OH	L 13–27	80,562
November 7	Wisconsin		Dyche Stadium; Evanston, IL	L 13–34	40,000
November 14	at Indiana		Memorial Stadium; Bloomington, IN	L 6–14	20,000
November 21	Illinois		Dyche Stadium; Evanston, IL (rivalry)	L 14–39	51,039
*Non-conference game; Rankings from AP Poll released prior to the game
