= Paul Giel =

American baseball player (1932–2002)

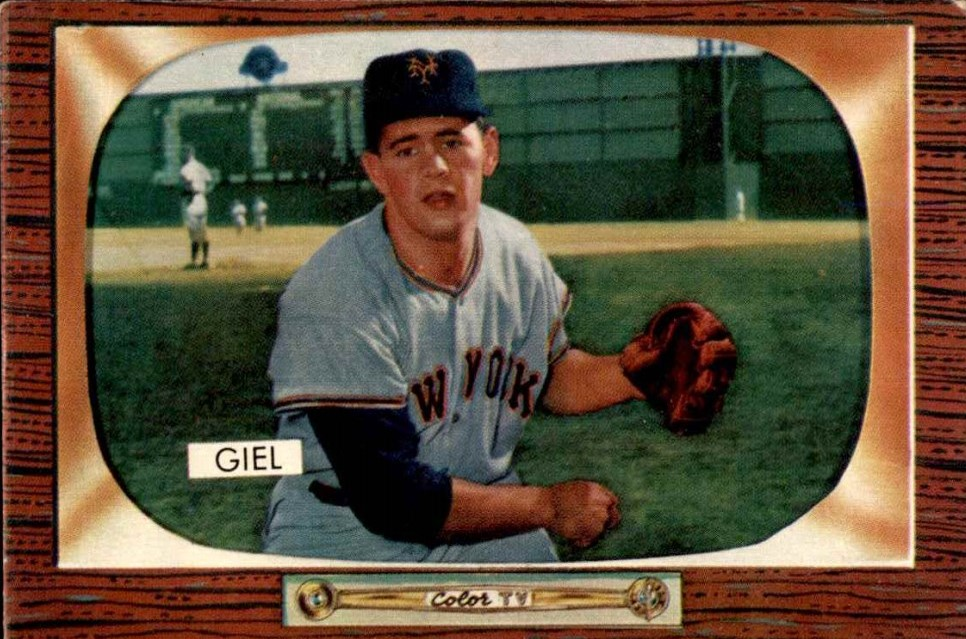
- Born: Paul Robert Giel; February 29, 1932; Winona, Minnesota, U.S.
- Died: May 22, 2002 (aged 70); Minneapolis, Minnesota, U.S.
- Baseball career
- Pitcher
- Batted: Right Threw: Right

MLB debut
- July 10, 1954, for the New York Giants

Last MLB appearance
- June 2, 1961, for the Minnesota Twins

MLB statistics
- Win–loss record: 11–9
- Earned run average: 5.39
- Strikeouts: 145
- Stats at Baseball Reference

Teams
- New York / San Francisco Giants (1954–1955, 1958); Pittsburgh Pirates (1959–1960); Kansas City Athletics (1961); Minnesota Twins (1961)
- Football career

No. 10
- Position: Halfback

Personal information
- Listed height: 5 ft 11 in (1.80 m)
- Listed weight: 185 lb (84 kg)

Career information
- High school: Winona
- College: Minnesota (1951–1953)

Awards and highlights
- UPI Player of the Year (1953); Consensus All-American (1953); First-team All-American (1952); 2× Big Ten Most Valuable Player (1952, 1953); 3× First-team All-Big Ten (1951–1953); Minnesota Golden Gophers No. 10 retired
- College Football Hall of Fame (Class of 1975)

Paul Robert Giel (February 29, 1932 – May 22, 2002) was an American college football and professional baseball player from Winona, Minnesota. He was an All-American in both sports at the University of Minnesota.

== Collegiate career ==
Giel attended the University of Minnesota, where he was a star single wing tailback for the Minnesota Golden Gophers football team. While at Minnesota, Giel was a member of Phi Kappa, which later merged with Phi Kappa Theta fraternity. During his career at Minnesota he rushed for 2,188 yards and had 1,922 yards passing. Giel received the Chicago Tribune Silver Football as the Big Ten's most valuable player twice, in 1952 and 1953, was named an All-American twice. Giel was the captain of the football team in 1953 that featured an upset of No. 5 Michigan for the Little Brown Jug. That year, he was the runner-up to Johnny Lattner of Notre Dame for the Heisman Trophy. His 1,794 votes received are the most by any player not to win the award. He was United Press International's college player of the year and the Associated Press back of the year.

Giel was a pitcher for the Minnesota Golden Gophers baseball team. He was selected to the 1953 College Baseball All-America Team by the American Baseball Coaches Association.

Giel was especially known for his speed and rapid cutting to change direction on the football field. At 185 pounds he was not a power runner. In the final game of the 1953 football season, Giel was clipped (tackled from behind while near the ball-carrier) on a kick return. This illegal action by an opposing player led to a fifteen-yard penalty and a broken ankle that for many confirmed the belief that Giel was too slight to have a professional football career. Despite this, the Canadian Football League (CFL) offered him $75,000 over three years.

== Professional career ==
Instead of professional football, after his collegiate days Giel pitched in the major leagues for the New York / San Francisco Giants, Pittsburgh Pirates, Minnesota Twins, and Kansas City Athletics. He signed with the Giants for a $60,000 bonus, which was their highest ever at the time.

After his retirement from baseball, Giel was a color commentator on Minnesota Vikings radio broadcasts from 1962 to 1969, and served as the University of Minnesota's Director of Athletics from 1971 to 1989. He was inducted into the College Football Hall of Fame in 1975.

== Personal life ==
Giel died following a heart attack on May 22, 2002. He was buried in Lakewood Cemetery.

== See also ==
- List of NCAA major college yearly punt and kickoff return leaders
- List of baseball players who went directly to Major League Baseball
