= 1953 Kansas Jayhawks football team =

American college football season

1953 Kansas Jayhawks football
- Conference: Big Seven Conference
- Record: 2–8 (2–4 Big 7)
- Head coach: Jules V. Sikes (6th season)
- Captains: Morris Kay; Bob Hantla
- Home stadium: Memorial Stadium

1953 Big Seven Conference football standings
	Conf.					Overall
Team	W		L		T	W		L		T
No. 4 Oklahoma $	6	–	0	–	0	9	–	1	–	1
Missouri	4	–	2	–	0	6	–	4	–	0
Kansas State	4	–	2	–	0	6	–	3	–	1
Colorado	2	–	4	–	0	6	–	4	–	0
Nebraska	2	–	4	–	0	3	–	6	–	1
Kansas	2	–	4	–	0	2	–	8	–	0
Iowa State	1	–	5	–	0	2	–	7	–	0
$ – Conference champion; Rankings from AP Poll

The 1953 Kansas Jayhawks football team represented the University of Kansas in the Big Seven Conference during the 1953 college football season. In their sixth season under head coach Jules V. Sikes, the Jayhawks compiled a 2–8 record (2–4 against conference opponents), finished tied for fourth in the Big Seven Conference, and were outscored by all opponents by a combined total of 179 to 83. They played their home games at Memorial Stadium in Lawrence, Kansas.

The team's statistical leaders included Don Hess with 369 rushing yards and 20 points scored, and John McFarland with 343 passing yards. Morris Kay and Bob Hantla were the team captains.

== Schedule ==
Date	Opponent	Site	Result	Attendance	Source
September 19	at TCU*	Amon G. Carter Stadium; Fort Worth, TX	L 0–13	26,000	
September 25	at No. 4 UCLA*	Los Angeles Memorial Coliseum; Los Angeles, CA	L 7–19	42,829	
October 3	Iowa State	Memorial Stadium; Lawrence, KS	W 23–0	23,676	
October 10	at Colorado	Folsom Field; Boulder, CO	W 27–21	24,300	
October 17	at No. 12 Oklahoma	Oklahoma Memorial Stadium; Norman, OK	L 0–45	45,862	
October 24	No. 13 SMU*	Memorial Stadium; Lawrence, KS	L 6–14	29,000	
October 31	at Nebraska	Memorial Stadium; Lincoln, NE (rivalry)	L 0–9	33,000	
November 7	Kansas State	Memorial Stadium; Lawrence, KS (rivalry)	L 0–7	25,000	
November 14	Oklahoma A&M*	Memorial Stadium; Lawrence, KS	L 14–41	17,000	
November 21	Missouri^{†}	Memorial Stadium; Lawrence, KS (Border War)	L 6–10	34,000	
*Non-conference game; ^{†}Homecoming; Rankings from AP Poll released prior to the game
