= 1953 Kansas State Wildcats football team =

American college football season

1953 Kansas State Wildcats football
- Conference: Big Seven Conference
- Record: 6–3–1 (4–2 Big 7)
- Head coach: Bill Meek (3rd season)
- Home stadium: Memorial Stadium

1953 Big Seven Conference football standings
	Conf.					Overall
Team	W		L		T	W		L		T
No. 4 Oklahoma $	6	–	0	–	0	9	–	1	–	1
Missouri	4	–	2	–	0	6	–	4	–	0
Kansas State	4	–	2	–	0	6	–	3	–	1
Colorado	2	–	4	–	0	6	–	4	–	0
Nebraska	2	–	4	–	0	3	–	6	–	1
Kansas	2	–	4	–	0	2	–	8	–	0
Iowa State	1	–	5	–	0	2	–	7	–	0
$ – Conference champion; Rankings from AP Poll

The 1953 Kansas State Wildcats football team represented Kansas State University in the 1953 college football season. The team's head football coach was Bill Meek. The Wildcats played their home games in Memorial Stadium. 1953 saw the Wildcats finish with a record of 6–3–1, and a 4–2 record in Big Seven Conference play, tied for second in the conference. The Wildcats scored 198 points while giving up 116.

Kansas State started the season with a 5–1 record, and made the program's first appearance in the top 20 of a national ranking system at #18 in the Coaches Poll on October 28. 1953 was also the first year that Kansas State played on national television, when its game on November 7 against rival Kansas was broadcast on NBC.

The team finished the season leading the NCAA in punt returns (23.8 yards per punt average).

== Schedule ==
Date	Time	Opponent	Rank	Site	TV	Result	Attendance	Source
September 19	8:00 p.m.	Drake*		Memorial Stadium; Manhattan, KS		W 50–0	11,000	
September 26		at Colorado A&M*		Colorado Field; Fort Collins, CO		L 13–14	10,500	
October 3		Nebraska		Memorial Stadium; Manhattan, KS (rivalry)		W 27–0	12,500	
October 10		at Iowa State		Clyde Williams Field; Ames, IA (rivalry)		W 20–12	8,037	
October 17		Colorado		Memorial Stadium; Manhattan, KS (rivalry)		W 28–14	14,000	
October 24		Wichita*		Memorial Stadium; Manhattan, KS		W 21–0	15,000	
October 31		No. 7 Oklahoma^{†}	No. 18	Memorial Stadium; Manhattan, KS		L 0–34	23,822	
November 7		at Kansas		Memorial Stadium; Lawrence, KS (rivalry)	NBC	W 7–0	25,000	
November 14		at Missouri		Memorial Stadium; Columbia, MO		L 6–16	17,000	
November 21		at Arizona*		Arizona Stadium; Tucson, AZ		T 26–26	19,000	
*Non-conference game; ^{†}Homecoming; Rankings from Coaches Poll released prior to the game; All times are in Central time
