= Wabash, Arkansas =

- Unincorporated community
- Location within Arkansas Location within the United States
- Coordinates: 34°23′19″N 90°49′43″W
- Country: United States
- State: Arkansas
- County: Phillips
- Elevation: 174 ft (53 m)
- Time zone: UTC-6 (Central (CST))
  - Summer (DST): UTC-5 (CDT)
- ZIP code: 72389
- Area code: 870
- GNIS feature ID: 58807

Wabash is an unincorporated community in Phillips County, Arkansas, United States. Wabash is located on Arkansas Highway 44, 2 miles (3.2 km) south-southwest of Lake View. Wabash has a post office with ZIP code 72389.

== Landmarks ==
Wabash, Arkansas is on the edge of Old Town Lake, and within 5 miles of the Arkansas Mississippi River. It's within 20 miles of Freedom Park and Fort Curtis, a Union Army fort during the Civil War.

== Demographics ==
Wabash has a population of 532, among 110 households. The median household income is $83,421 (2021). The unemployment rate is 5.6% (July 2023). The community is 56.77% white and 43.23% Black.

== Politics ==
Wabash, Arkansas is in the 1st US Congressional District, Arkansas State Senate District 62, and Arkansas State House of Representatives District 9.
