= Stan Wallace =

American football player (1931–1999)

No. 40, 74
- Positions: Defensive back, halfback

Personal information
- Born: November 15, 1931; Hillsboro, Illinois, U.S.
- Died: December 6, 1999 (aged 68); Urbana, Illinois, U.S.
- Listed height: 6 ft 3 in (1.91 m)
- Listed weight: 208 lb (94 kg)

Career information
- High school: Hillsboro
- College: Illinois
- NFL draft: 1954: 1st round, 6th overall pick

Career history
- Chicago Bears (1954, 1956–1958); Toronto Argonauts (1960–1961)

Awards and highlights
- CFL East All-Star (1960)

Career NFL statistics
- Interceptions: 10
- Fumble recoveries: 6
- Return yards: 13
- Stats at Pro Football Reference

Stanley Howard Wallace (November 15, 1931 – December 6, 1999) was a defensive back for the Chicago Bears of the National Football League (NFL). After playing college football for the Illinois Fighting Illini, he was drafted in the first round (6th overall) of the 1954 NFL draft. He played for four years as a defensive back, catching 10 interceptions over his career.

He played his last two seasons with the Toronto Argonauts of the Canadian Football League (CFL), playing 24 regular season and 4 playoff games, and catching 9 passes and intercepting 3 passes. He was an East Division All-Star in 1960.
