= 1953 Michigan State Spartans football team =

American college football season

1953 Michigan State Spartans football

Big Ten co-champion Rose Bowl champion

Rose Bowl, W 28–20 vs. UCLA
- Conference: Big Ten Conference

Ranking
- Coaches: No. 3
- AP: No. 3
- Record: 9–1 (5–1 Big Ten)
- Head coach: Biggie Munn (7th season)
- MVP: Leroy Bolden
- Captain: Don Dohoney
- Home stadium: Macklin Stadium

1953 Big Ten Conference football standings
	Conf.					Overall
Team	W		L		T	W		L		T
No. 3 Michigan State +	5	–	1	–	0	9	–	1	–	0
No. 7 Illinois +	5	–	1	–	0	7	–	1	–	1
No. 15 Wisconsin	4	–	1	–	1	6	–	2	–	1
Ohio State	4	–	3	–	0	6	–	3	–	0
Minnesota	3	–	3	–	1	4	–	4	–	1
No. 20 Michigan	3	–	3	–	0	6	–	3	–	0
No. 9 Iowa	3	–	3	–	0	5	–	3	–	1
Purdue	2	–	4	–	0	2	–	7	–	0
Indiana	1	–	5	–	0	2	–	7	–	0
Northwestern	0	–	6	–	0	3	–	6	–	0
+ – Conference co-champions; Rankings from AP Poll

The 1953 Michigan State Spartans football team was an American football team that represented Michigan State College (now known as Michigan State University) in the 1953 Big Ten Conference football season. In their first season in the Big Ten Conference, and their seventh and final season under head coach Biggie Munn, the Spartans compiled a 9–1 record (5–1 in conference games), outscored opponents by a total of 240 to 110, and shared the Big Ten title with Illinois. They represented the Big Ten in the Rose Bowl, defeated UCLA, 28–20, and finished ranked third in both the AP and Coaches polls.

The season was part of the Spartans' school-record, 28-game winning streak that began on October 14, 1950, and ended with a 6-0 loss at Purdue on October 24, 1953. The move to the Big Ten in 1953 also set up Michigan State's first ever matchups with Illinois and Iowa. Every other Big Ten school at the time had played the Spartans at least once prior to them joining the conference.

The team's statistical leaders included Leroy Bolden (691 rushing yards), Tom Yewcic (489 passing yards), and Ellis Duckett (169 receiving yards). Bolden was selected as the team's most valuable player. End Don Dohoney was a consensus All-American. Bolden and Doheney also received first-team honors from both the writers and coaches on the 1953 All-Big Ten Conference football team.

== Schedule ==
Date	Opponent	Rank	Site	Result	Attendance	Source
September 26	at Iowa	No. 2	Iowa Stadium; Iowa City, IA	W 21–7	47,125	
October 3	at Minnesota	No. 2	Memorial Stadium; Minneapolis, MN	W 21–0	61,594	
October 10	TCU*	No. 2	Macklin Stadium; East Lansing, MI	W 26–19	51,049	
October 17	Indiana^{†}	No. 2	Macklin Stadium; East Lansing, MI (rivalry)	W 47–18	51,698	
October 24	at Purdue	No. 2	Ross–Ade Stadium; West Lafayette, IN	L 0–6	35,000	
October 31	Oregon State*	No. 6	Macklin Stadium; East Lansing, MI	W 34–6	51,108	
November 7	at Ohio State	No. 5	Ohio Stadium; Columbus, OH	W 28–13	82,328	
November 14	Michigan	No. 4	Macklin Stadium; East Lansing, MI (rivalry)	W 14–6	52,324	
November 21	Marquette*	No. 3	Macklin Stadium; East Lansing, MI	W 21–15	42,170	
January 1, 1954	vs. No. 5 UCLA*	No. 3	Rose Bowl; Pasadena, CA (Rose Bowl)	W 28–20	100,100	
*Non-conference game; ^{†}Homecoming; Rankings from AP Poll released prior to the game
