= Harry Jagielski =

American football player (1931–1993)

No. 76, 75, 73, 70
- Positions: Defensive tackle, offensive tackle

Personal information
- Born: December 25, 1931; Pittsburgh, Pennsylvania, U.S.
- Died: October 9, 1993 (aged 61); Chicago, Illinois, U.S.
- Listed height: 6 ft 0 in (1.83 m)
- Listed weight: 257 lb (117 kg)

Career information
- High school: Tilden (Chicago)
- College: Indiana (1950–1953)
- NFL draft: 1954: 7th round, 80th overall pick

Career history
- Washington Redskins (1956); Chicago Cardinals (1956); Boston Patriots (1960–1961); Oakland Raiders (1961)

Awards and highlights
- Second-team All-Big Ten (1953)

Career NFL/AFL statistics
- Games played: 36
- Games started: 29
- Interceptions: 1
- Stats at Pro Football Reference

Harry Anthony Jagielski (December 25, 1931 – October 9, 1993) was an American football player who played offensive and defensive tackle in the National Football League (NFL) for the Washington Redskins and the Chicago Cardinals. He also played in the American Football League (AFL) for the Boston Patriots and the Oakland Raiders. Jagielski played college football at Indiana University and was drafted in the seventh round of the 1954 NFL draft.
