= J. C. Caroline =

American gridiron football player (1933–2017)

No. 82, 85, 25
- Positions: Cornerback, halfback

Personal information
- Born: January 17, 1933; Warrenton, Georgia, U.S.
- Died: November 17, 2017 (aged 84); Urbana, Illinois, U.S.
- Listed height: 6 ft 0 in (1.83 m)
- Listed weight: 185 lb (84 kg)

Career information
- High school: Booker T. Washington (Columbia, South Carolina)
- College: Illinois (1953–1954)
- NFL draft: 1956: 7th round, 82nd overall pick

Career history
- Toronto Argonauts (1955); Montreal Alouettes (1955); Chicago Bears (1956–1965)

Awards and highlights
- NFL champion (1963); NFL Rookie of the Year (1956); Pro Bowl (1956); 100 greatest Bears of All-Time; Consensus All-American (1953); First-team All-Big Ten (1953)

Career NFL statistics
- Interceptions: 24
- Interception yards: 405
- Fumble recoveries: 6
- Defensive touchdowns: 3
- Stats at Pro Football Reference
- College Football Hall of Fame

James C. Caroline (January 17, 1933 – November 17, 2017) was an American football player in the National Football League (NFL) and Canadian Football League (CFL). He played college football for the Illinois Fighting Illini, where he played as a halfback and was a consensus All-American in 1953. After a year in the CFL with the Toronto Argonauts and the Montreal Alouettes, Caroline played for 10 seasons in the NFL with the Chicago Bears. He was inducted into the College Football Hall of Fame in 1980.

== Playing career ==
Caroline played college football for the Illinois Fighting Illini as a halfback, where he lettered in 1953 and 1954. Caroline led the nation in rushing with 1,256 yards in 1953 as a sophomore, and was named All-American.

Signed for $15,000, Caroline played with the Toronto Argonauts. After being cut by the Argonauts, Caroline signed with the Montreal Alouettes, where he rushed for 575 yards in his first season. He played in the 1955 Grey Cup game. In 1956, Caroline earned a physical education degree from Florida A&M University and was drafted in the seventh round by the Chicago Bears with the 82nd overall pick in the 1956 NFL draft.

Caroline had a 10-year career with the Bears. Playing as a cornerback, Caroline finished his career with 24 interceptions and six touchdowns, two rushing, one receiving, one fumble recovery, and two on interceptions. Caroline intercepted Johnny Unitas's first NFL career pass attempt and returned it for a touchdown. He was a two-way player for the Bears' 1956 Western Conference champions and a cornerback on the 1963 NFL championship team.

== Honors and later life ==
After his professional football career, Caroline moved to Urbana, Illinois and coached the Urbana High School football team in 1982. He taught physical education at Urbana Middle School.

Caroline was inducted into the College Football Hall of Fame in 1980. He was portrayed by actor Bernie Casey in the 1971 biopic Brian's Song.

J. C. Caroline died in 2017.

== See also ==
- List of college football yearly rushing leaders
