= 1953 Ohio State Buckeyes football team =

American college football season

1953 Ohio State Buckeyes football
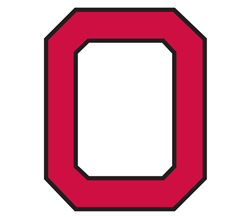
- Conference: Big Ten Conference

Ranking
- Coaches: No. 20
- Record: 6–3 (4–3 Big Ten)
- Head coach: Woody Hayes (3rd season)
- MVP: George Jacoby
- Captains: George Jacoby; Robert Joslin
- Home stadium: Ohio Stadium

1953 Big Ten Conference football standings
	Conf.					Overall
Team	W		L		T	W		L		T
No. 3 Michigan State +	5	–	1	–	0	9	–	1	–	0
No. 7 Illinois +	5	–	1	–	0	7	–	1	–	1
No. 15 Wisconsin	4	–	1	–	1	6	–	2	–	1
Ohio State	4	–	3	–	0	6	–	3	–	0
Minnesota	3	–	3	–	1	4	–	4	–	1
No. 20 Michigan	3	–	3	–	0	6	–	3	–	0
No. 9 Iowa	3	–	3	–	0	5	–	3	–	1
Purdue	2	–	4	–	0	2	–	7	–	0
Indiana	1	–	5	–	0	2	–	7	–	0
Northwestern	0	–	6	–	0	3	–	6	–	0
+ – Conference co-champions; Rankings from AP Poll

The 1953 Ohio State Buckeyes football team represented the Ohio State University in the 1953 Big Ten Conference football season. The Buckeyes compiled a 6–3 record.

1953 was the first year that Big Ten co-champion Michigan State competed in the league. The game against Michigan State was Ohio State's third all-time meeting with them and their first game against the Spartans as conference-mates.

== Schedule ==
Date	Opponent	Rank	Site	Result	Attendance	Source
September 26	Indiana	No. 7	Ohio Stadium; Columbus, OH	W 36–12	75,898	
October 3	at California*	No. 6	California Memorial Stadium; Berkeley, CA	W 33–19	47,000	
October 10	Illinois	No. 3	Ohio Stadium; Columbus, OH (Illibuck)	L 20–41	81,745	
October 17	at Penn*	No. 17	Franklin Field; Philadelphia, PA	W 12–6	44,270	
October 24	at Wisconsin		Camp Randall Stadium; Madison, WI	W 20–19	52,819	
October 31	Northwestern		Ohio Stadium; Columbus, OH	W 27–13	80,562	
November 7	No. 5 Michigan State	No. 16	Ohio Stadium; Columbus, OH	L 13–28	82,328	
November 14	Purdue		Ohio Stadium; Columbus, OH	W 21–6	77,465	
November 21	at Michigan		Michigan Stadium; Ann Arbor, MI (rivalry)	L 0–20	87,048	
*Non-conference game; Rankings from AP Poll released prior to the game

== Coaching staff ==
- Woody Hayes - Head Coach - 3rd year

== 1954 NFL draftees ==
Player	Round	Pick	Position	NFL club
George Jacoby	6	65	Tackle	New York Giants
Mike Takacs	13	147	Guard	Green Bay Packers
Bob Myers	22	256	Tackle	Baltimore Colts
George Rosso	25	296	Defensive Back	Washington Redskins
