= 1953 Michigan Wolverines football team =

American college football season

1953 Michigan Wolverines football
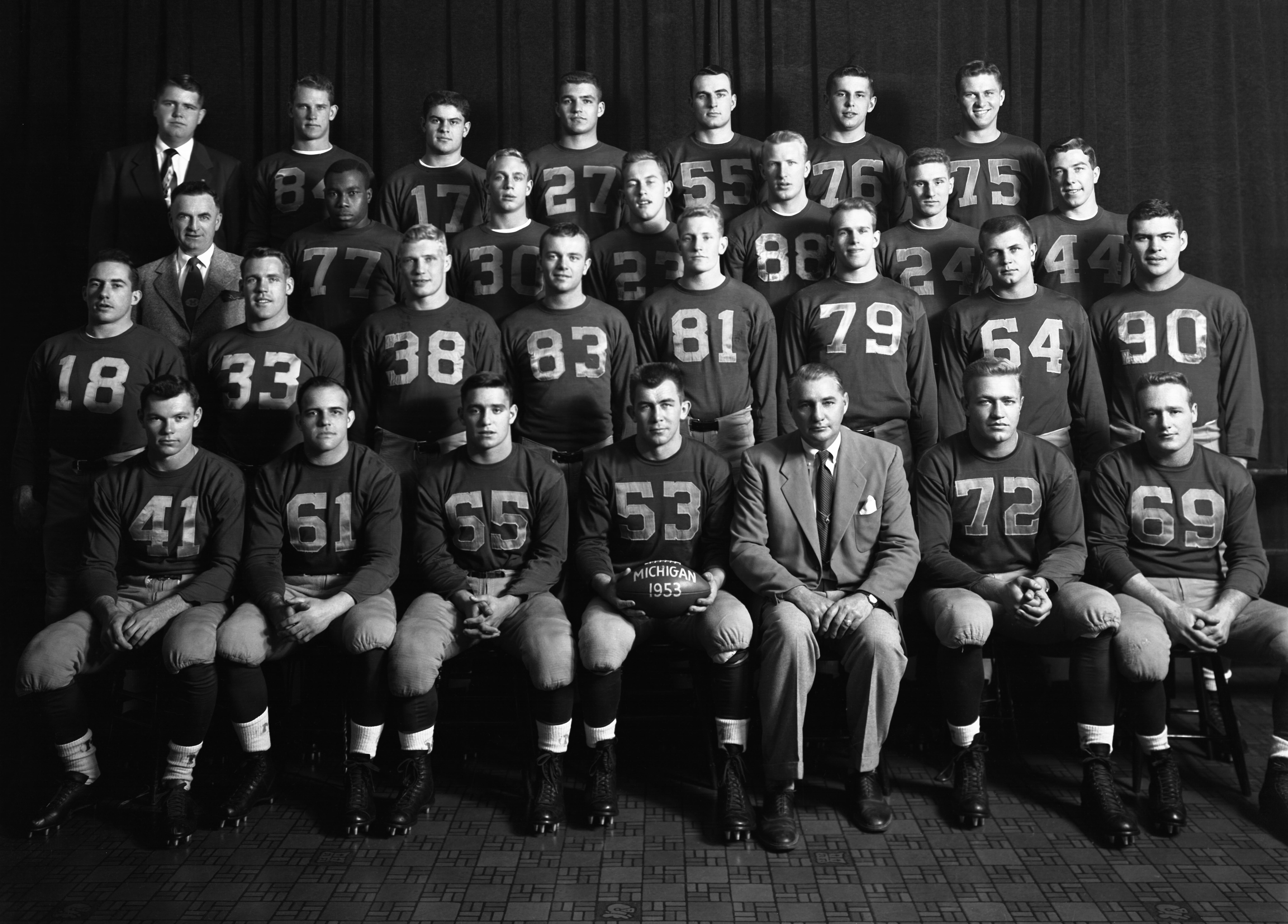
- Conference: Big Ten Conference

Ranking
- Coaches: No. 19
- AP: No. 20
- Record: 6–3 (3–3 Big Ten)
- Head coach: Bennie Oosterbaan (6th season)
- MVP: Tony Branoff
- Captain: Dick O'Shaughnessy
- Home stadium: Michigan Stadium

1953 Big Ten Conference football standings
	Conf.					Overall
Team	W		L		T	W		L		T
No. 3 Michigan State +	5	–	1	–	0	9	–	1	–	0
No. 7 Illinois +	5	–	1	–	0	7	–	1	–	1
No. 15 Wisconsin	4	–	1	–	1	6	–	2	–	1
Ohio State	4	–	3	–	0	6	–	3	–	0
Minnesota	3	–	3	–	1	4	–	4	–	1
No. 20 Michigan	3	–	3	–	0	6	–	3	–	0
No. 9 Iowa	3	–	3	–	0	5	–	3	–	1
Purdue	2	–	4	–	0	2	–	7	–	0
Indiana	1	–	5	–	0	2	–	7	–	0
Northwestern	0	–	6	–	0	3	–	6	–	0
+ – Conference co-champions; Rankings from AP Poll

The 1953 Michigan Wolverines football team represented the University of Michigan in the 1953 Big Ten Conference football season. In its sixth year under head coach Bennie Oosterbaan, Michigan compiled a 6–3 record (3–3 against conference opponents), tied for fifth place in the Big Ten, outscored opponents by a combined total of 163 to 101, and was ranked No. 20 in the final AP Poll and No. 19 in the Coaches Polls.

Center Dick O'Shaughnessy was the team captain, and right halfback Tony Branoff received the team's most valuable player award. Two Michigan players received All-Big Ten honors: left end Bob Topp was selected by the Associated Press as a first-team player, and left halfback Ted Kress.

The team's statistical leaders included quarterback Duncan McDonald with 293 passing yards, Tony Branoff with 501 rushing yards, and Bob Topp with 331 receiving yards.

== Schedule ==
Date	Opponent	Rank	Site	Result	Attendance	Source
September 26	Washington*		Michigan Stadium; Ann Arbor, MI	W 50–0	44,086	
October 3	Tulane*	No. 4	Michigan Stadium; Ann Arbor, MI	W 26–7	51,960	
October 10	Iowa	No. 5	Michigan Stadium; Ann Arbor, MI	W 14–13	49,551	
October 17	Northwestern	No. 5	Michigan Stadium; Ann Arbor, MI (rivalry)	W 20–12	64,420	
October 24	at Minnesota	No. 5	Memorial Stadium; Minneapolis, MN (Little Brown Jug)	L 0–22	62,795	
October 31	Penn*^{†}	No. 16	Michigan Stadium; Ann Arbor, MI	W 24–14	56,795	
November 7	at No. 4 Illinois	No. 17	Memorial Stadium; Champaign, IL (rivalry)	L 3–19	69,507	
November 14	at No. 4 Michigan State		Macklin Stadium; East Lansing, MI (rivalry)	L 6–14	51,421	
November 21	Ohio State		Michigan Stadium; Ann Arbor, MI (rivalry)	W 20–0	87,048	
*Non-conference game; ^{†}Homecoming; Rankings from AP Poll released prior to the game

== Statistical leaders ==
Michigan's individual statistical leaders for the 1953 season include those listed below.

=== Rushing ===
Player	Attempts	Net yards	Yards per attempt	Touchdowns
Tony Branoff	100	501	5.0	5
Ted Kress	101	339	3.4	5
Bob Hurley	47	282	6.0	1

=== Passing ===
Player	Attempts	Completions	Interceptions	Comp %	Yards	Yds/Comp	TD	Long
Duncan McDonald	46	20	3	43.5	293	14.7	4	49
Lou Baldacci	51	21	6	41.2	285	13.6	1	36
Ted Kress	43	19	7	44.2	238	12.5	1	44

=== Receiving ===
Player	Receptions	Yards	Yds/Recp	TD	Long
Bob Topp	23	331	14.4	2	66
Gene Knutson	11	201	18.3	1	33
Tony Branoff	11	151	13.7	1	44

=== Kickoff returns ===
Player	Returns	Yards	Yds/Return	TD	Long
Ted Kress	10	203	20.3	0	33
Tony Branoff	6	130	21.7	0	28

=== Punt returns ===
Player	Returns	Yards	Yds/Return	TD	Long
Tony Branoff	8	90	11.3	0	18
Ted Kress	12	63	5.3	0	16

== Personnel ==
=== Letter winners ===
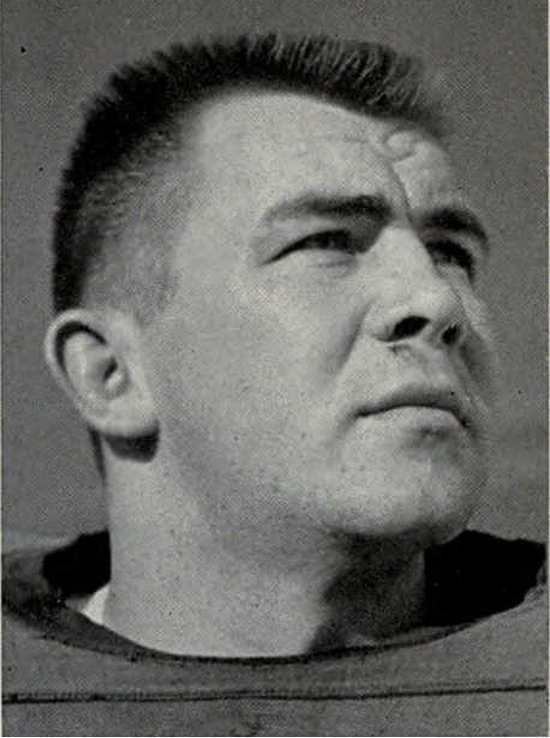
Dick O'Shaughnessy, captain of the 1953 team

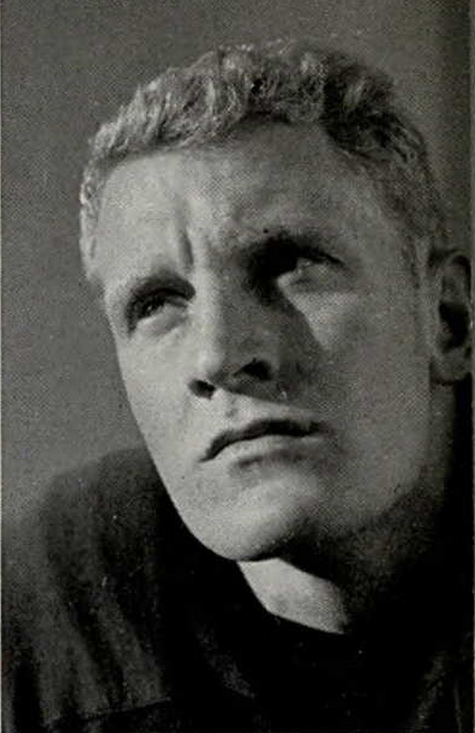
End Bob Topp

The following 31 players received varsity letters for their participation on the 1953 team. Players who started at least four games are shown with their names in bold.

- Fred Baer, 5'11", 180 pounds, junior, LaGrange, IL - fullback
- **Lou Baldacci**, 6'0", 205 pounds, sophomore, Akron, OH - started 9 games at quarterback
- **James T. Balog**, 6'3", 210 pounds, senior, Wheaton, IL - started 9 games at left tackle
- **Richard E. Balzhiser**, 6'0", 186 pounds, senior, Wheaton, IL - started 9 games at fullback
- **Richard A. Beison**, 6'0", 200 pounds, senior, East Chicago, IN - started 9 games at right guard
- Donald C. Bennett, 6'2", 195 pounds, senior, Chicago - tackle
- **Tony Branoff**, 5'11", 180 pounds, sophomore, Flint, MI - started 9 games at right halfback
- Theodore J. Cachey, 5'11", 185 pounds, senior, Chicago - guard
- J. Daniel Cline, 5'10", 168 pounds, junior, Brockport, NY - halfback
- **Donald Dugger**, 5'10", 185 pounds, senior, Charleston, WV - started 9 games at left end
- George S. Dutter, 6'2", 190 pounds, senior, Fort Wayne, IN - end
- James W. Fox, 6'0", 185 pounds, sophomore, Saginaw, MI - guard
- H. Ronald Geyer, 6'2", 220 pounds, junior, Toledo, OH - tackle
- Edward L. Hickey, 5'8", 160 pounds, senior, Anaconda, MT - halfback
- Robert S. Hurley, 5'10", 180 pounds, senior, Alamosa, CO- fullback
- Raymond K. Kenaga, 5'11", 170 pounds, junior, Sterling, IL - quarterback
- **Eugene P. Knutson**, 6'4", 210 pounds, senior, Beloit, WI - started 8 games at right end
- William P. Kolesar, 6'0", 190 pounds, sophomore, Mentor, OH - tackle
- **Ted Kress**, 5'11", 175 pounds, senior, Kansas City, MO - started 9 games at left halfback
- Duncan B. McDonald, 6'0", 175 pounds, junior, Flint, MI - quarterback
- G. Edgar Meads, 6'0", 190 pounds, sophomore, Oxford, MI - guard
- **John M. Morrow**, 6'2", 220 pounds, sophomore, Ann Arbor, MI - started 4 games at center
- **Dick O'Shaughnessy**, 5'11", 190 pounds, senior, Seaford, NY - started 5 games at center
- H. John Peckham Jr., 6'2", 220 pounds, sophomore, Sioux Falls, SD - center
- Thad C. Stanford, 6'0", 175 pounds, senior, Midland, MI - end
- **Dick Strozewski**, 6'0", 205 pounds, senior, South Bend, IN - started 9 games at left tackle
- **Bob Topp**, 6'2", 190 pounds, senior, Kalamazoo, MI - started 8 games at left end, 1 game at right end
- John J. Veselenak, 6'2", 190 pounds, junior, Flint, MI - end
- Art Walker, 5'11" 200 pounds, junior, South Haven, MI - tackle
- Gerald H. Williams, 6'2", 188 pounds, sophomore, Flint, MI - started 1 game at left end
- Ronald M. Williams, 5'9", 185 pounds, senior, Massillon, OH - guard

=== Coaches and staff ===
Michigan's 1953 coaching, training, and support staff included the following persons.

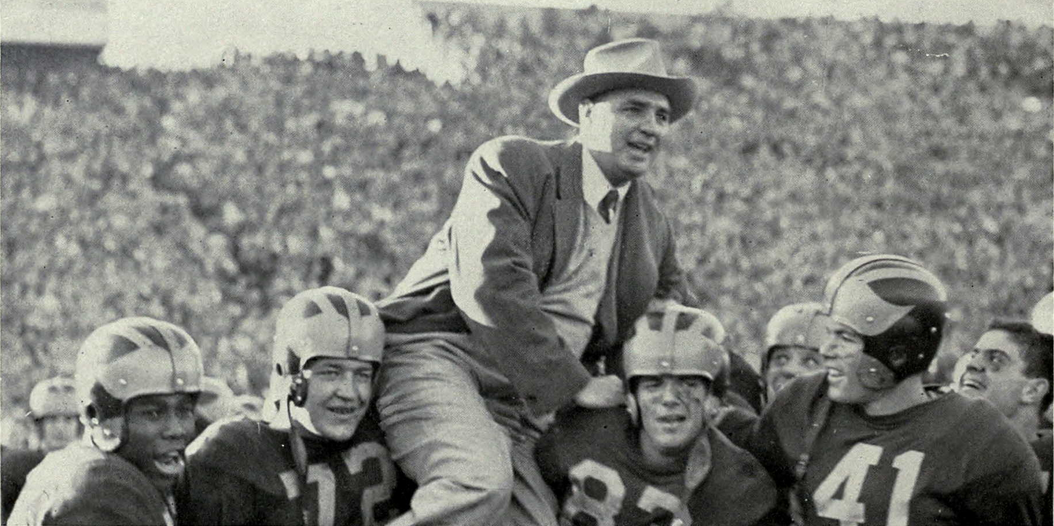
Oosterbaan lifted to players' shoulders after 20-0 win over Ohio State

- Head coach: Bennie Oosterbaan
- Assistant coaches:

- Jack Blott - line coach
- Cliff Keen - assistant football coach, head wrestling coach
- Bill Orwig - offensive backfield coach
- Matt Patanelli - defensive ends coach
- Don Robinson - defensive backfield coach
- Wally Weber - freshman coach
- J. T. White - assistant line coach, scout, and junior varsity coach

- Trainer: Jim Hunt
- Manager: Richard Petrie

== Awards and honors ==
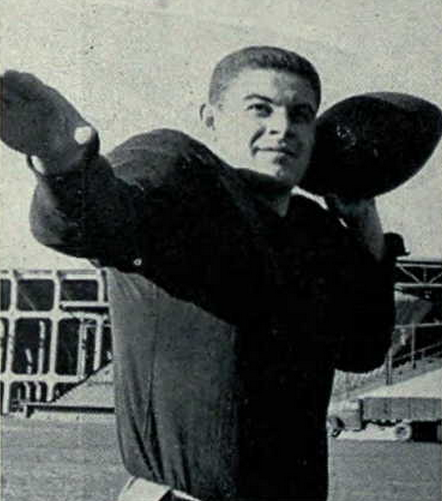
Tony Branoff, 1954 Most Valuable Player

Honors and awards for the 1953 season went to the following individuals.

- Captain: Dick O'Shaughnessy
- All-Conference: Ted Kress, Bob Topp
- Most Valuable Player: Tony Branoff
- Meyer Morton Award: Tony Branoff
