= The Play (American football) =

Chaotic game-winning kickoff return during a college football game in 1982

1982 Big Game Stanford vs. California
Stanford Cardinal	California Golden Bears
(5–5)	(6–4)
20	25
Head coach: Paul Wiggin	Head coach: Joe Kapp
	1	2	3	4	Total
Stanford	0	0	14	6	20
California	0	10	0	15	25
- Date: November 20, 1982
- Season: 1982
- Stadium: California Memorial Stadium
- Location: Berkeley, California
- Referee: Charles Moffett
- Halftime show: Cal Band and Stanford Band
- Attendance: 75,662

United States TV coverage
- Network: USA Network
- Announcers: Barry Tompkins and John Beasley

"The Play" was a last-second, game-winning kickoff return for a walk-off touchdown that occurred during a college football game between the Stanford Cardinal and California Golden Bears on Saturday, November 20, 1982. Given the circumstances and rivalry, the wild game that preceded it, the very unusual way in which "The Play" unfolded, and its lingering aftermath on players and fans, it is recognized as one of the most memorable plays in college football history and among the most memorable in American sports.

Stanford had taken a 20–19 lead on a field goal with four seconds left. The Golden Bears used five lateral passes on the ensuing kickoff return to score the winning touchdown in the game's final seconds and earn a 25–20 victory. Believing that the game was over, members of the Stanford Band came onto the field midway through the return, which added to the confusion and folklore. There remains disagreement over the legality of two of Cal's backward pass attempts, adding to the passion surrounding the traditional rivalry of the annual "Big Game."

== Background ==
This was the two teams' 85th Big Game, and was played on Cal's home field, California Memorial Stadium. Although Cal was guaranteed a winning record (with bowl eligibility) for the season, no bowl game was looking to invite them. The implications of this game were far more important to Stanford, led by quarterback John Elway, who was playing in his last regular-season college game before heading to the National Football League. The Cardinal were in the midst of an exciting season—they were 5–5 but had victories over highly ranked Ohio State and Washington—and needed one more win to be eligible for a bowl game. Representatives of the Hall of Fame Classic committee were in attendance, apparently to extend an invitation to Stanford to play Vanderbilt if the Cardinal won.

Also at stake was possession of the Stanford Axe, an axe-head trophy that is awarded to the winner of this annual matchup. Its origin dates back to 1899; however, after years of increasingly more elaborate thefts of the Axe by students from one or the other school, in 1933, the two schools agreed that the winner of the Big Game would take possession of the Axe. The plaque upon which the Axe is mounted carries the score of previous Big Games.

== Game summary ==
Cal took a 10–0 lead at the half on a field goal (after having one blocked on its first drive) and a two-play, 55-yard touchdown drive that consisted of long passes from Gale Gilbert to Mariet Ford, including a diving catch by Ford in the end zone.

Cal missed another field goal on its first drive of the second half, which was answered by an 80-yard touchdown drive by Stanford for the Cardinal's first score. The drive included a controversial catch by Mike Tolliver, who appeared to have been out of bounds, and was capped by back-to-back passes from John Elway to running back Vincent White.

Stanford took its first lead of the game, 14–10, on another touchdown reception by White, but relinquished the lead after a Cal field goal and touchdown pass from Gilbert to Wes Howell to make the score 19–14 Cal.

A failed two-point conversion by Cal after their latest touchdown loomed large, when Stanford subsequently cut the Cal lead to 19–17 on a field goal and was thus just another field goal away from re-taking the lead.

After losing the ball on a fumble on its next possession, Stanford got the ball back on its own 20-yard line with 1:27 left. At that point, the lead had changed twice in the second half and would do so two more times in the game's final moments.

== The situation ==
With Cal leading 19–17 late in the fourth quarter, Elway and the Cardinal had one final chance to score the go-ahead points. Needing just a field goal to win, Elway overcame an early fourth and long deep in Stanford territory and got the Cardinal to the Golden Bears' 23-yard line. With eight seconds remaining, Stanford kicker Mark Harmon hit a field goal to give the Cardinal a 20–19 lead.

However, two things happened that would play into what would follow. Elway had been instructed by head coach Paul Wiggin to call timeout with eight seconds left to give his team two chances to kick in case the snap was botched on the attempt; if he had waited an additional four seconds to call the timeout, Harmon's kick would have been the final play of the game and Stanford would have won. Not only that, but Stanford was called for an unsportsmanlike conduct penalty after the play, so not only would they have to kick it back to Cal, but from 15 yards farther back than normal. Because Harmon was likely to execute a squib kick on the ensuing kickoff, Cal would not have as great a distance to cover once the kick was fielded.

Still, with only four seconds left on the clock, the Golden Bears would almost certainly need to score a touchdown on the ensuing kickoff to win barring any defensive penalty; Cal radio announcer Joe Starkey remarked on KGO radio that "only a miracle" would help. As the teams got ready for the kickoff, Cal defensive back Richard Rodgers told the rest of the special teams players, "Don't get tackled with the ball."

Cal rushed onto the field without 11 players on their special teams unit, which defensive back and return man Kevin Moen spotted right away. When he noticed this, he moved a few yards away from his normal position. As was expected, Harmon executed the squib kick. The ball bounced right to Moen, who fielded it at the Cal 45.

Here is the sequence that followed.

- Moen tried and failed to make any progress with the ball. He spotted Rodgers to his left and lateraled the ball to him.
- Rodgers was very quickly surrounded, gaining only one yard before looking behind him for Dwight Garner, who caught the ball around the Cal 45.
- Garner ran straight ahead for five yards, but was surrounded by five Stanford players. However, while being tackled, he managed to pitch the ball back to Rodgers. It was at this moment, believing that Garner had been tackled and the game was over, that several Stanford players on the sideline and the entire Stanford band (which had been waiting behind the south end zone) ran onto the field in celebration.
- Rodgers dodged another Stanford player and took the ball to his right, toward the middle of the field, where at least four other Cal players were ready for the next pitch. Around the Stanford 45, Rodgers pitched the ball to Mariet Ford, who caught it in stride. Meanwhile, the Stanford band, all 144 members, had run out past the south end zone—the one the Cal players were trying to get to—and had advanced as far as twenty yards downfield. The scrum of players was moving towards them.
- Ford avoided a Stanford player and sprinted upfield while moving to the right of the right hash mark, and into the band, which was scattered all over the south end of the field. Around the Stanford 27, three Stanford players smothered Ford, but while falling forward he threw a blind lateral over his right shoulder.
- Also on the field were "several Stanford cheerleaders, assorted spectators, three members of the Stanford Axe Committee" and "at least 11 illegal players who had wandered onto the field."
- Moen caught it at about the 25 and charged toward the end zone. One Stanford player missed him, and another could not catch him from behind. Moen ran through the scattering Stanford Band members for the touchdown, which he famously completed by running into unaware trombone player Gary Tyrrell.

The Cal players celebrated wildly—but the officials had not signaled the touchdown. Stanford coach Paul Wiggin and his players argued to the officials that Dwight Garner's knee had been down, negating what had happened during the rest of the play. Meanwhile, the officials huddled. The chaos at the end of The Play made the officials' task very challenging. In particular, the questionable fifth lateral took place in the midst of the Stanford band, greatly reducing visibility. Referee Charles Moffett recalled the moment:

I called all the officials together and there were some pale faces. The penalty flags were against Stanford for coming onto the field. I say, "did anybody blow a whistle?" They say "no". I say, "were all the laterals legal?" "Yes". Then the line judge, Gordon Riese, says to me, "Charlie, the guy scored on that." And I said, "What?" I had no idea the guy had scored. Actually when I heard that I was kind of relieved. I thought we really would have had a problem if they hadn't scored, because, by the rules, we could have awarded a touchdown [to Cal] for [Stanford] players coming onto the field. I didn't want to have to make that call. I wasn't nervous at all when I stepped out to make the call; maybe I was too dumb. Gee, it seems like it was yesterday. Anyway, when I stepped out of the crowd, there was dead silence in the place. Then when I raised my arms, I thought I had started World War III. It was like an atomic bomb had gone off.

Moffett signaled the touchdown, rendering the illegal participation penalty on Stanford irrelevant and ending the game, making the final score 25–20 in favor of Cal.

== Controversy ==
In this photo of the fifth lateral, the ball appears to have left Ford's hands outside the 27-yard line

Moen reaches for the ball but has not yet caught it outside the 25-yard line

The officials' ruling of a Cal touchdown was highly controversial at the time, and The Play has remained a source of often intense disagreement throughout the intervening decades, particularly between ardent Stanford and Cal fans. The controversy centers on the legality of two of the five laterals as well as on the chaos that ensued when the Stanford team and band entered the playing field while the ball was still live.

Many Stanford players and coaches objected immediately to the third lateral, from Dwight Garner to Richard Rodgers, asserting that Garner's knee was down moments beforehand. Kevin Lamar, a Stanford player who was in on the tackle, maintains that Garner's knee had hit the turf while he was still in possession of the ball; Garner and Rodgers themselves, however, assert the opposite. TV replays were inconclusive; due to the distance from the camera and the swarm of tacklers, one cannot see the exact moment Garner's knee may have touched.

Finally, while the replay of the tackle of Garner is not conclusive, Stanford was clearly guilty of illegal participation, both from too many players on the field and the band. At least two game officials immediately threw penalty flags on Stanford for having too many men on the field. A football game cannot end on a defensive penalty (unless declined), so had any of the Cal ball carriers been tackled short of the end zone, Cal would have had at least one unclocked play from scrimmage, and perhaps a touchdown outright for outside interference. The game referee, Charles Moffett, noted this as a likely outcome in a subsequent interview (see above). Rule 9-1, Article 4 of the official NCAA football rules, "Illegal Interference", allows the referee to award a score if "equitable" after an act of interference. For example, officials in the 1954 Cotton Bowl Classic awarded a touchdown to Rice after Alabama fullback Tommy Lewis jumped onto the field from the sideline to tackle Rice running back Dickey Maegle as he was running toward a touchdown.

The NCAA's instant replay rules were not adopted until 2005, more than two decades later, so the officials could not consult recorded television footage to resolve these issues. It is unclear whether instant replay would have had any impact, as a field ruling cannot be overturned unless there is "indisputable video evidence" to the contrary.

=== Analysis of the controversy ===
Many attempts have been made to analyze the disputed areas of The Play and resolve its controversies. This has proven to be a difficult task for several reasons. Only one television replay is available, and it is from a distant and elevated midfield camera. The rules of college football do not precisely cover The Play's bizarre final seconds. Finally, the intense passion from both Cal and Stanford fans often make objective analysis of The Play a great challenge.

Among the notable attempts at deconstructing The Play are:

- The national magazine Sports Illustrated, as part of a 12-page article that appeared the following fall ("The Anatomy of a Miracle," September 1, 1983), found no mistakes in officiating. Cal's only error was having four men in the restraining area before kickoff, an issue that did not result in a penalty. In the article, Garner said that his knee was parallel to the ground when he tossed the third lateral. Of the fifth lateral, SI determined that it was "clearly thrown backwards" and would have hit the 27 had Moen not caught it.
- ABC, as part of the show prepared for the award of "Pontiac's Ultimate High-Performance Play of the NCAA", analyzed the video of the fifth lateral from Ford to Moen and concluded that the ball traveled laterally along the 25-yard line, thus making it a legal action.
- In 2007, as part of the buildup to The Play's 25th anniversary, the Bay Area News Group asked Verle Sorgen, the Pac-10 Conference's supervisor of instant replay, to review the two disputed laterals according to modern NCAA instant replay review rules. (Sorgen was not asked to rule on the larger issue of the Stanford band's outside interference.) After watching enhanced footage on a modern, large-screen monitor, Sorgen opined that there was insufficient video evidence to overturn the third lateral, from Garner to Rodgers. However, Sorgen believed that the fifth lateral from Ford to Moen "was released at the 22 [probably meant “27”] and touched at the 20-1/2 [probably meant “25-1/2”]. From that, it clearly appears forward." Asked for his "ultimate call", Sorgen replied, "I would be tempted to reverse it...then go out and get the motor running in my car."
- A detailed review of the views of the referees who officiated the game, and The Play, was published in Fall 2022. In interviews, they do not indicate that they would upon reflection have changed their collective no-call against Cal.

== Aftermath ==
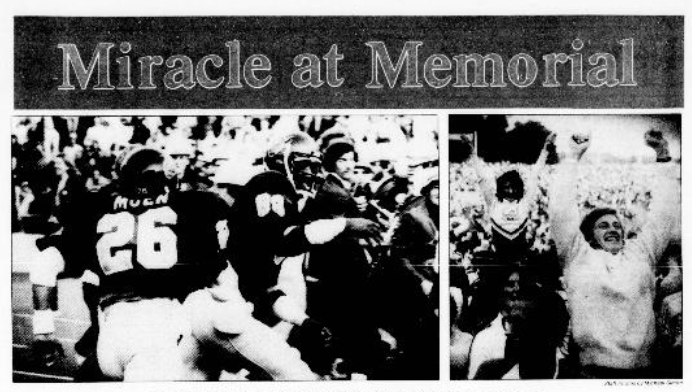
The Daily Californian headline on November 22, 1982: "Miracle at Memorial"

Four days after the game, students at The Stanford Daily published a bogus version of Cal's student newspaper, The Daily Californian, with the lead story claiming that the NCAA had declared Cal's last play to be dead in a ruling three days after the game. According to that bogus paper, the official score would be recorded in the NCAA record books as Stanford 20, California 19. The Stanford students then distributed 7,000 copies of the phony "extra" on the Cal campus. A few days later, blue and gold t-shirts depicting the play with Xs and Os (much like a coach's diagram) complete with squiggly lines for the laterals, appeared in the Cal bookstore and throughout the Bay Area.

The season after The Play, Stanford went 1–10 and Paul Wiggin was fired. Wiggin later said The Play "had a big effect on our program, especially on recruiting." Athletics director Andy Geiger said the loss devastated the program. Others blamed the loss on the Stanford Band. Of the band's role, Geiger said, "Although the Band did not cause the Play, it was typical that they would have been in the wrong place at the wrong time." The incumbent Stanford band manager now annually passes the position to the new manager with 4 seconds left in the Stanford–Cal game.

Whenever Stanford holds the Stanford Axe, the plaque is altered in protest so that the outcome reads as a 20–19 Stanford victory. When the Axe is returned to Cal's possession, the plaque is changed back to the official score: California 25, Stanford 20.

For many years, John Elway was bitter, on both a personal level and on behalf of his team, about the touchdown being allowed: "This was an insult to college football... They [the officials] ruined my last game as a college football player." The Play cost Stanford an invitation to the Hall of Fame Classic; the invitation intended for the Cardinal instead went to Air Force, and Elway completed his college career having never played in a bowl game. Geiger said that the loss cost Elway the Heisman Trophy. Elway would nevertheless enjoy a tremendously successful NFL career, winning two Super Bowls with the Denver Broncos, and was inducted into the Pro Football and College Football Halls of Fame. Years later, Elway came to terms with The Play, stating that "each year it gets a little funnier."

The participants in The Play faded into relative obscurity in the years since, with the only memorable participants in the game being Elway and announcer Joe Starkey for his famous call of The Play.

Ron Rivera, a starting linebacker for California, went on to play for the 1985 Chicago Bears who went 15–1 during the regular season and won Super Bowl XX. He has since been a head coach for the Carolina Panthers and Washington Commanders of the NFL, and was named NFL Coach of the Year in 2013 and 2015. Rivera returned to Cal in 2025 as the football program's general manager, overseeing staffing and name, image, and likeness/revenue sharing activities.

Emile Harry, Stanford wide receiver, after graduating '85, was drafted with the 89th pick by the Atlanta Falcons, then went on to play 8 seasons for the Kansas City Chiefs.

Gary Plummer, a linebacker for the Golden Bears, was drafted into the United States Football League in 1983. He played 8 seasons with the San Diego Chargers before joining the San Francisco 49ers in 1994, as part of their Super Bowl XXIX winning team. Plummer retired from the NFL after the 1997 season.

The most infamous participant in The Play is Mariet Ford, who also caught 7 passes for 132 yards and a touchdown in the game. Ford, who briefly played wide receiver for the Oakland Invaders of the United States Football League, was convicted of murdering his pregnant wife and 3-year-old son in 1997. He is serving a 45 years-to-life sentence.

Kevin Moen had a short-lived professional career and is now a real estate broker in the Los Angeles area. In 2002, he coached the Palos Verdes Colts, a Pop Warner football team. He was also the head football coach at Palos Verdes Peninsula High School, starting in the 2008–2009 school year until 2011-12. A statue of Moen catching the ball was unveiled in 2022 outside of California Memorial Stadium.

Gary Tyrrell, the Stanford trombonist run over by Moen, is a venture capital firm CFO and amateur brewer. He became friends with Moen and Cal coach Joe Kapp. He appeared on television's The Tonight Show along with the key Cal players shortly after The Play; his smashed trombone is now displayed in the College Football Hall of Fame. He has also said, "I thought I'd be famous for my talent as a musician, not for being knocked down at a football game."

Dwight Garner, who later spent two years with the Washington Redskins and retired, was a risk manager with Interim Healthcare. He died of prostate cancer at the age of 58 on November 18, 2022, one day before the 125th Big Game, during which Cal commemorated the 40th anniversary of The Play.

Richard Rodgers Sr. played in the CFL and is now an assistant coach in the NFL. His son, Richard Rodgers II, who also played for Cal, became a tight end for the Green Bay Packers in 2014. On December 3, 2015, the younger Rodgers had heroics of his own, catching a Hail Mary from Cal alum Aaron Rodgers with no time left to help them beat the Detroit Lions 27–23. The Hail Mary was quickly coined as "The Miracle in Motown". After the game, Richard Rodgers II admitted thinking about The Play his father was part of, stating "It's a really special moment for him and I was kind of thinking on the play before, when Aaron got the facemask, I was kind of thinking we would do something like that. Obviously it turned out differently."

Gale Gilbert was the starting quarterback for the Cal Bears. Gilbert is the only player in NFL history to be a member of five straight Super Bowl teams. His son, Garrett Gilbert, was the starting quarterback for the Texas Longhorns, and later for the Dallas Cowboys.

John Tuggle was California's starting fullback in the game. He finished with 28 carries for 97 yards, a performance that was largely overshadowed by "The Play". After this, he went on to earn the Mr. Irrelevant award by being selected by the New York Giants with the last pick of the 1983 NFL draft. Tuggle played most of the 1983 season on special teams, but was promoted to starting fullback in week 12 when Rob Carpenter went down with an injury. He finished the season with 17 carries for 49 yards and a touchdown, three receptions for 50 yards, and 9 kickoff returns for 156 yards. At the end of the season, his teammates voted him special teams player of the year. In 1984, Tuggle was diagnosed with cancer. He never played another NFL game; Tuggle died on August 30, 1986.

After the game, Kapp proclaimed, "The Bear would not quit, the Bear would not die." The phrase became the motto of the Cal team under Kapp.

== Rankings ==
List	Rank
The Best Damn Sports Show Period The 50 Greatest Football Plays of All Time	1st
SportsCenter Top 40 Moments in Sports History	2nd
The Best Damn Sports Show Period The 50 Most Outrageous Moments in Sports	3rd
The Best Damn Sports Show Period The 50 Greatest Touchdowns of All Time	4th
TV Guide and TV Land Present: The 100 Most Unexpected TV Moments	16th

Based on online voting, Pontiac announced the California v. Stanford game of Nov. 20, 1982, as its "Ultimate High-Performance Play of the NCAA," crowning the play as NCAA Football's most memorable moment of all-time in December 2003.

The game was placed in NCAA Football video games as a "College Classic," challenging players to recreate the ending. The challenge begins with the player controlling the Bears as the Cardinal kick the field goal leading up to the final kickoff.

== Joe Starkey's call ==
Cal announcer Joe Starkey of KGO-AM 810 radio called the game. The following is a transcript of his famous call:

All right, here we go with the kickoff. Harmon will probably try to squib it, and he does. Ball comes loose and the Bears have to get out of bounds. Rodgers, along the sideline, another one... they're still in deep trouble at midfield, they tried to do a couple of—the ball is still loose, as they get it to Rodgers! They get it back now to the 30, they're down to the 20! Oh, the band is out on the field! He's gonna go into the end zone! He got into the end zone!

Will it count? The Bears have scored, but the bands are out on the field! There were flags all over the place. Wait and see what happens; we don't know who won the game. There are flags on the field. We have to see whether or not the flags are against Stanford or Cal. The Bears may have made some illegal laterals. It could be that it won't count. The Bears, believe it or not, took it all the way into the end zone. If the penalty is against Stanford, California would win the game. If it is not, the game is over and Stanford has won.

We've heard no decision yet. Everybody is milling around on the (conferencing officials now finally signal a touchdown) field! And the Bears! The Bears have won! The Bears have won! Oh, my God! The most amazing, sensational, dramatic, heart-rending, exciting, thrilling finish in the history of college football! California has won the Big Game over Stanford! Oh, excuse me for my voice, but I have never, never seen anything like it in the history of I have ever seen any game in my life! The Bears have won it! There will be no extra point!

The portion of the call during the officials' deliberation is often edited out when the clip is replayed, making it seem as though Starkey declared Cal the victors immediately after the run.

== Music City Miracle (2000) ==
Similar to The Play, the "Music City Miracle" was a kickoff return with a controversial lateral that resulted in a game-winning touchdown. In an NFL wild-card playoff game between the Tennessee Titans and the Buffalo Bills at the venue now known as Nissan Stadium in Nashville, Tennessee, the Bills took a 16–15 lead on a 41-yard field goal by Steve Christie with 16 seconds remaining. The ensuing kickoff was fielded by the Titans' Lorenzo Neal, who handed the ball off to Frank Wycheck. Faced with oncoming defenders, Wycheck turned to his left and passed the ball across the field to Kevin Dyson, who was protected by a wall of blockers. Dyson ran untouched 75 yards down the sideline to score a touchdown. Unlike The Play, NFL rules in 2000 allowed for a replay official to call for video review of any questionable on-field call in the final two minutes of a game, and such a review was immediately declared to determine if Wycheck's pass to Dyson was an illegal forward pass. After a lengthy delay, officials determined that video evidence was inconclusive to overturn the ruling on the field, and the play was upheld as a touchdown. Although there were 3 seconds left on the clock when Dyson scored, nothing came of the Bills' ensuing kickoff return and the Titans went on to win the game 22–16. Later, computer analysis established that Dyson caught the ball on the same yard marker that Wycheck threw it from, confirming that the pass was indeed a lateral.

On ABC's television broadcast of the game, color commentator Joe Theismann said immediately after the score, in an obvious reference to The Play, "All that's missing is the band. That's the only thing missing."
