= Unfair act =

American football foul

In American football, an unfair act is a foul that can be called when a player or team commits a flagrant and obviously illegal act that has a major impact on the game, and from which, if additional penalties were not enforced, the offending team would gain an advantage.

All of the major American football codes include some form of unfair act rule. In all cases, the definition is deliberately vague, giving the officials great latitude in defining such an act and enforcing penalties for such acts. At the high school level, officials are free to assess any penalty they see fit, up to and including forfeiture of the game. The National Federation of State High School Associations, however, also includes the general rule that all acts are legal unless otherwise explicitly stated; thus, the unfair act rule is only invoked in cases when specific rules have clearly been broken, but the penalty for the foul does not cancel the advantage gained by committing the foul.

The National Football League defines two types of unfair acts, a palpably unfair act and an extraordinarily unfair act. For the former, the general rule is that "palpably unfair" acts interfere illegally with the course of play, be it from player or non-player action, and the compensation must be, in the judgment of the officials, "equitable" to what the result of the play would have been without the act happening. In the event of an ongoing threat, such as a riot in the stands, the officials can also suspend the game until the situation is resolved. The extraordinarily unfair act rule is for acts so extraordinary that the NFL Commissioner can levy fines, require the offending team to surrender draft picks, and suspend players. Under Rule 17 of the NFL rulebook, the commissioner also has the authority to overturn a game result (that is, order a forfeit loss to the offending team and a walkover win for the wronged team), order the game to be fully replayed, or to discard the results of the game from the unfair act onward and resume play from immediately before that point. In the last case, the game can only be resumed in progress within 48 hours of the unfair act or other disaster; otherwise, the game must be replayed from the beginning. To date, no commissioner has ever used his authority to alter a game result.

== Examples ==
An early example of an unfair act (though such a rule was not yet codified) occurred on November 23, 1918, when Navy faced the powerful Great Lakes NTS team. With Navy leading 6-0, the Midshipmen's captain Bill Ingram fumbled the ball, resulting in Harry Lawrence Eielson, of Great Lakes, picking up the ball and running it most of the way back down the field. However, before Eielson could cross the goal line, Saunders, a substitute for Navy, leapt up off the bench and tackled him, later claiming "an impulse [had] seized him and that made him forget everything" (though some claimed Navy's coach Gil Dobie directed Saunders to make the tackle). The referees reacted by awarding Great Lakes a touchdown, and placed the ball for the goal kick (which at that time was determined in a rugby-styled manner based on where the runner crossed the goal line) in the center of the goal posts, allowing Great Lakes to make an easy goal kick to win the game. Though the rules of the time did not allow for the awarding of points in this manner, "Every one [sic] admits that Great Lakes had to be awarded a touchdown," with the referee acting "upon general principles, rather than a specific rule".

The 1954 Cotton Bowl Classic featured a notorious use of the rule. Rice University's Dicky Moegle broke free for an apparent touchdown run, but Alabama's Tommy Lewis entered the field and tackled Moegle. This could have been ruled illegal participation, for which the penalty then was 5 yards. However, the officials declared a palpably unfair act and credited the touchdown anyway. Modern college and NFL officials are explicitly permitted to award a touchdown under such circumstances.

The high school rulebook specifies one situation to be penalized as an unfair act: when the defensive team makes repeated fouls near its own goal line, for which the regular penalty (advancing the ball half the distance to the goal) is trivial.

In 2022, the NFL threatened to use the unfair act clause against the Buffalo Bills when fans at Highmark Stadium bombarded the field with snowballs during a December 17 game against the Miami Dolphins. Because referee Bill Vinovich threatened a 15-yard unsportsmanlike conduct penalty if the snowball throwing continued, The Buffalo News argued, based on a precedent following a similar situation in 1985 between the San Francisco 49ers and Denver Broncos when a snowball hurled during an extra point attempt hit 49ers holder Matt Cavanaugh and allowed the Broncos to tackle him before the kick was attempted, that Vinovich had acted outside the bounds of the NFL rulebook when making the threat.

=== Deliberate fouls in the NFL ===
The NFL's rule on deliberate fouls is open-ended but covers only "successive or repeated fouls to prevent a score." It would only be a palpably unfair act for the defense to commit deliberate fouls, preferring the certainty of a small penalty over the uncertainty of a score attempt, if the defense did so again after an official's warning.

The Snowplow Game on December 12, 1982 was played during a snowstorm. The only score was a field goal by the hosting New England Patriots with 4:49 remaining. Before the score, the grounds crew plowed a path for placekicker John Smith to make the kick easier. The game officials allowed this act, but Miami Dolphins coach Don Shula—a longtime member of the NFL Competition Committee, which proposes rules changes to be voted upon by owners—protested to Commissioner Pete Rozelle that it constituted an unfair act and thus could be overturned. Rozelle agreed the act was unfair and could be punished, but refused on principle to ever overturn a game result.

On November 6, 2016, near the end of the first half, the San Francisco 49ers deliberately held pass receivers, forcing the New Orleans Saints to settle for a short field goal. The NFL instructed its officials that this would be a palpably unfair act subject to a 15-yard penalty if repeated. On November 27, 2016, the Baltimore Ravens took a safety, conceding 2 points of their 7-point lead. They committed numerous holding fouls on the same play to ensure that they could exhaust the final 11 seconds of the game. This was not a palpably unfair act because it did not recur.

Beginning in the 2017 NFL season, deliberately committing fouls to manipulate the game clock was classified as unsportsmanlike conduct. In the first test of the rule, on October 21, 2019, it went unenforced, as the New England Patriots committed repeated dead-ball penalties (which their opponent New York Jets declined) and ran out nearly a minute of game clock without being penalized. This was subsequently repeated by the Tennessee Titans that same season in their wild card playoff win over the New England Patriots. Former Patriot player and Tennessee Titan head coach, Mike Vrabel, had his team commit various penalties to run 50 seconds off the clock in the final quarter of the game.

On a key drive late in the 2018 NFC Championship Game, Nickell Robey-Coleman of the Los Angeles Rams made a helmet-to-helmet hit that constituted pass interference. The officials called neither foul, and the Rams ultimately beat the New Orleans Saints in overtime. A lawsuit from Saints fans sought to force the league to use its unfair act clause and replay at least a portion of the game. The league opposed this on financial grounds, claiming it would have to postpone the Super Bowl to do so, and ultimately the court ruled in the league's favor, ruling that fans had no standing to sue over rules enforcement. Robey-Coleman was later fined for the hit.

During the 2024 NFC Championship Game, the Washington Commanders committed three encroachment penalties in a row defending the goal line, in an attempt to thwart the Philadelphia Eagles' signature quarterback sneak, the "tush push." Following the third penalty, referee Shawn Hochuli warned the Commanders that further encroachments would result in the awarding of a score to the Eagles per the palpably unfair act rule. The next snap was taken without a penalty and Philadelphia scored.

== See also ==
- Professional foul, the equivalent foul in other codes of football
- Awarded goal, a similar situation in ice hockey
- Committing deliberate personal fouls in basketball
  - Hack-a-Shaq, a now-discouraged deliberate-fouling strategy in basketball that purposely targeted poor free throw shooters regardless of whether they had the ball or not
