= Leo Rucka =

American football player (1931–2016)

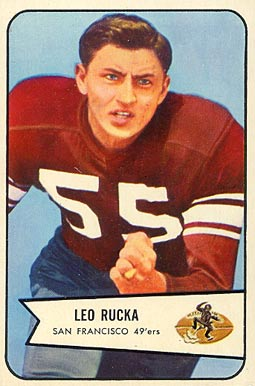
- Rucka on a 1954 Bowman football card

No. 50
- Position: Linebacker

Personal information
- Born: August 18, 1931; Wooster, Texas, U.S.
- Died: January 4, 2016 (aged 84); Crosby, Texas, U.S.
- Listed height: 6 ft 3 in (1.91 m)
- Listed weight: 212 lb (96 kg)

Career information
- High school: Crosby
- College: Rice (1950–1953)
- NFL draft: 1954: 2nd round, 23rd overall pick

Career history
- San Francisco 49ers (1956)

Awards and highlights
- First-team All-SWC (1953)

Career NFL statistics
- Fumble recoveries: 1
- Stats at Pro Football Reference

Leopold Victor Rucka (August 18, 1931 – January 4, 2016) was an American professional football player who played linebacker for the San Francisco 49ers during the 1956 NFL season and for the Rice Owls, earning first-team All-Southwest Conference honors. He was selected by the 49ers in the second round of the 1954 NFL draft.

Leo was born in Wooster, an area of Baytown, TX, on August 18, 1931, and graduated from Crosby High School in 1950, where he excelled in football, basketball, and all other major sports.

He went to college at Rice University where he played for 3 seasons and was a co-captain of the 1953 Rice Owls team that won a share of the Southwest Conference title tied with Texas and then beat Alabama in the 1954 Cotton Bowl Classic to finish the season ranked 6th overall. It would be the last bowl game victory for the Owls until 2008, the last Cotton Bowl victory ever and the last time the team was ever ranked as high as 6th. That season he was named 1st Team All-Southwest Conference as a center.

Rucka missed the 1954-55 NFL seasons because he was drafted into the Army, where he served as an aviation engineer. He served in Far East during the Korean War for 20 months during which he continued to play football and was named to the All-Service Team.

After returning from service, Rucka played in 5 NFL games in 1956. He had one documented fumble recovery. His teammates nicknamed him "the Quiet Man".

Rucka was inducted into the Rice Athletics Hall of Fame in 1996.

Rucka was married to his wife of over 60 years, Lillian Rucka. They had 5 children, 11 grandchildren, and several great-grandchildren. After football, he worked for Rohm & Haas for many years. Rucka died on January 4, 2016.
