= Rice Owls football =

College football team of Rice University

2026 Rice Owls football team
- First season: 1912; 114 years ago
- Athletic director: Tommy McCleland
- Head coach: Scott Abell; 1st season, 5–8 (.385)
- Location: Houston, Texas
- Stadium: First Community Stadium (capacity: 47,000)
- NCAA division: Division I FBS
- Conference: American
- Colors: Blue and gray
- All-time record: 501–667–32 (.431)
- Bowl record: 7–7 (.500)

Conference championships
- SWC: 1934, 1937, 1946, 1949, 1953, 1957, 1994 C-USA: 2013

Division championships
- C-USA West: 2008, 2013
- Consensus All-Americans: 6
- Rivalries: Baylor (rivalry); Houston (rivalry); SMU (rivalry); Texas (rivalry); North Texas; Tulsa
- Fight song: Rice Fight
- Mascot: Sammy the Owl
- Marching band: Marching Owl Band
- Website: RiceOwls.com

The Rice Owls football program represents Rice University in the sport of American football. The team competes at the NCAA Division I FBS level and compete in the American Conference. First Community Stadium, built in 1950, hosts the Owls' home football games. Rice has the second-smallest undergraduate enrollment of any FBS member, ahead of only Tulsa.

== History ==
Rice fielded its first football team in 1912, not long after opening its doors. Three years later, it joined the Southwest Conference as a charter member.

For the better part of half a century, Rice was a regional and national powerhouse. However, by the early 1960s, Rice found it increasingly difficult to field competitive teams. For most of its tenure in the SWC, it was one of only four private schools in the conference, and by far the smallest in terms of undergraduate enrollment. However, by the latter part of longtime coach Jess Neely's tenure, Rice found itself competing against schools ten times or more its size, and often had more freshmen than Rice had total undergraduates. From 1964 to 1991, Rice had only one overall winning season, and only finished as high as third in SWC play once.

Fred Goldsmith took over as head coach in 1989, and led the Owls to a 6-5 overall record and a tie for second place in 1992, their best finish in 28 years. However, a 61–34 loss to in-city rival Houston kept them out of their first bowl game in 31 years. Goldsmith left for Duke in 1993 and was succeeded by former Clemson coach Ken Hatfield, who tallied only three winning seasons in 12 years. While the Owls were bowl-eligible in those three years, they didn't receive bowl bids due to their small alumni and fan base.

Todd Graham became head coach in 2006, and led the Owls to their first bowl game in 35 years, the 2006 New Orleans Bowl. He left after only one year and was succeeded by David Bailiff, who took the Owls to three bowl games in 11 years, including their first 10-win seasons in half a century.

=== 1954 Cotton Bowl Classic ===
The Owls played in the 1954 Cotton Bowl Classic against the Crimson Tide of Alabama. The game featured one of the most famous plays in college football history when Rice's Dickey Moegle (later Maegle) burst free on a sweep play, and on his way down the sideline, was tackled by Tommy Lewis, who had come off the Alabama sideline without his helmet to tackle Moegle. Referee Cliff Shaw saw Lewis come off the bench and gave the Owls the 95-yard touchdown. Rice would win the game 28–6, with the only Crimson Tide score coming from Lewis. The yardage added to Moegle's 265 yards rushing, a Cotton Bowl Classic record that would stand until Tony Temple's effort in 2008. This would be the Owls' last bowl win until the 2008 Texas Bowl, a win which also secured the Owls their first 10-win season since 1949.

=== Kennedy Speech ===
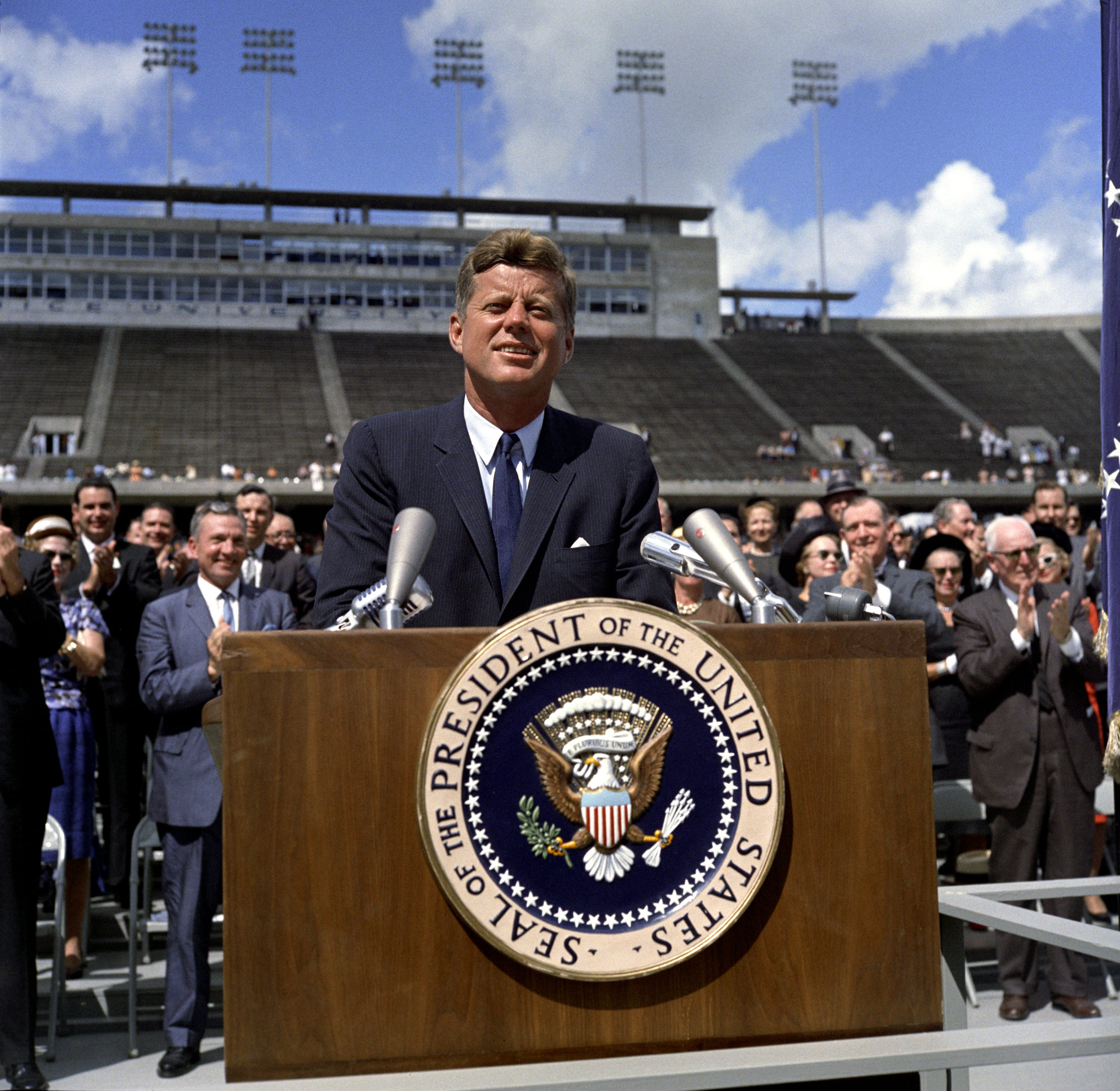
President Kennedy speaks at Rice Stadium on the American space program, 12 September 1962

Rice Stadium also hosted a "We choose to go to the Moon" speech by John F. Kennedy on September 12, 1962. In it, he used the Rice football team to challenge America to send a man to the Moon before 1970.

"But why, some say, the Moon? Why choose this as our goal? And they may well ask why climb the highest mountain? Why, 35 years ago, fly the Atlantic? Why does Rice play Texas? We choose to go to the Moon. We choose to go to the Moon in this decade and do the other things, not because they are easy, but because they are hard, because that goal will serve to organize and measure the best of our energies and skills, because that challenge is one that we are willing to accept, one we are unwilling to postpone, and one which we intend to win, and the others, too."

While this analogy rings true today, many Rice fans today see the speech as a curse given that in the 30 seasons immediately preceding the speech, the series was evenly split 15-15-0 and as of 2026, Rice has only won the series twice after the speech.

== Conference affiliations ==
- Independent (1912–1914)
- Southwest Conference (1915–1995)
- Western Athletic Conference (1996–2004)
- Conference USA (2005–2022)
- American Conference (2023–present)

== Head coaches ==
Name	Seasons	Overall	Pct.	Bowls
Philip Arbuckle	1912–1917,1919–1923	51–25–8	.655	
John E. Anderson	1918	1–5–1	.214	
John Heisman	1924–1927	14–18–3	.443	
Claude Rothgeb	1928	2–7	.222	
Jack Meagher	1929–1933	26–26	.500	
Jimmy Kitts	1934–1939	33–29–4	.530	1–0
Jess Neely	1940–1966	144–124–10	.536	3–3
Bo Hagan	1967–1970	12–27–1	.313	
Bill Peterson	1971	3–7–1	.318	
Al Conover	1972–1975	14–28–2†	.341	
Homer Rice	1976–1977	4–18	.182	
Ray Alborn	1978–1983	13–53	.197	
Watson Brown	1984–1985	4–18	.182	
Jerry Berndt	1986–1988	6–27	.182	
Fred Goldsmith	1989–1993	23–31–1	.427	
Ken Hatfield	1994–2005	55–78–1	.414	
Todd Graham	2006	7–6	.538	0–1
David Bailiff	2007–2017	57–80	.416	3–1
Mike Bloomgren	2018–2024	22–46	.324	0-2
Scott Abell	2025-present	5-8	.385	0-1

† 15–27–2 overall per NCAA due to 1975 forfeit win over Mississippi State.

== Championships ==
=== Conference championships ===
Rice has won eight conference championships, five outright and three shared.

Year	Conference	Coach	Overall record	Conference record
1934	Southwest Conference	Jimmy Kitts	9–1–1	5–1
1937	Southwest Conference	Jimmy Kitts	6–3–2	4–1–1
1946†	Southwest Conference	Jess Neely	9–2	5–1
1949	Southwest Conference	Jess Neely	10–1	6–0
1953†	Southwest Conference	Jess Neely	9–2	5–1
1957	Southwest Conference	Jess Neely	7–4	5–1
1994†	Southwest Conference	Ken Hatfield	5–6	4–3
2013	Conference USA	David Bailiff	10–4	7–1

† Co-championship

=== Division championships ===
Rice has won two division championships.

Year	Division	Coach	Opponent	CG result
2008†	C-USA West	David Bailiff	N/A lost tiebreaker to Tulsa	
2013	C-USA West	David Bailiff	Marshall	W 41–24

† Co-championship

== Bowl games ==
Rice has participated in 15 bowl games, garnering a record of 7–8.

Season	Coach	Bowl	Opponent	Result
1937	Jimmy Kitts	Cotton Bowl Classic	Colorado	W 28–14
1946	Jess Neely	Orange Bowl	Tennessee	W 8–0
1949	Jess Neely	Cotton Bowl Classic	North Carolina	W 27–13
1953	Jess Neely	Cotton Bowl Classic	Alabama	W 28–6
1957	Jess Neely	Cotton Bowl Classic	Navy	L 7–20
1960	Jess Neely	Sugar Bowl	Ole Miss	L 6–14
1961	Jess Neely	Bluebonnet Bowl	Kansas	L 7–33
2006	Todd Graham	New Orleans Bowl	Troy	L 17–41
2008	David Bailiff	Texas Bowl	Western Michigan	W 38–14
2012	David Bailiff	Armed Forces Bowl	Air Force	W 33–14
2013	David Bailiff	Liberty Bowl	Mississippi State	L 7–44
2014	David Bailiff	Hawaii Bowl	Fresno State	W 30–6
2022	Mike Bloomgren	LendingTree Bowl	Southern Miss	L 24–38
2023	Mike Bloomgren	First Responder Bowl	Texas State	L 21–45
2025	Scott Abell	Armed Forces Bowl	Texas State	L 10-41

== Stadium ==
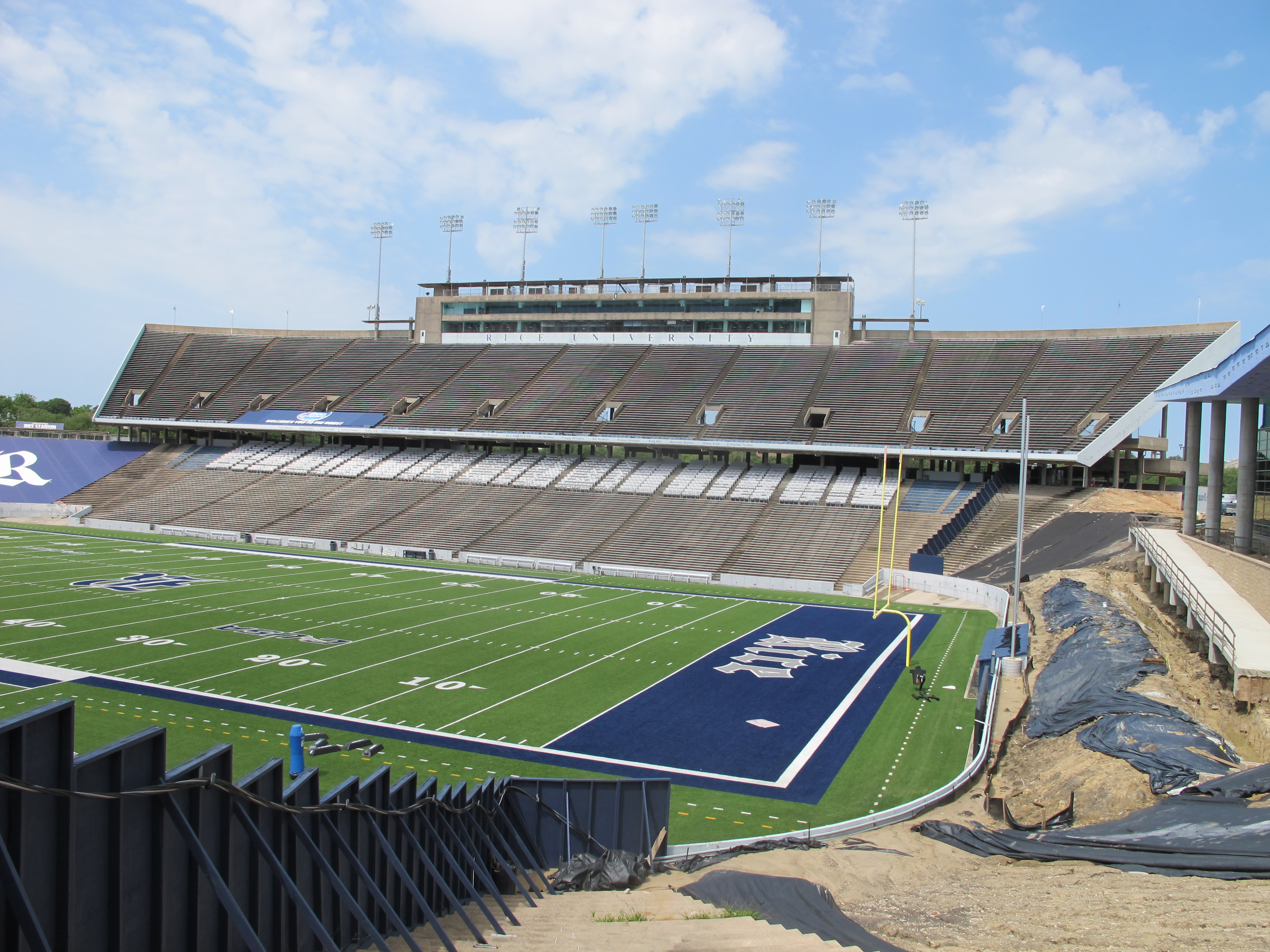
First Community Stadium as of April 2016

First Community Stadium was built in 1950, and has been the home of Owls football ever since. It hosted the NFL Super Bowl in January 1974. It replaced the old Rice Field (now Rice Track/Soccer Stadium) to increase seating. Total seating capacity in the current stadium was reduced from 70,000 to 47,000 before the 2006 season. The endzone seating benches were removed and covered with tarps, and all of the wooden bleachers were replaced with new, metal seating benches in 2006, as well. The stadium is also undergoing further renovations. In October 2026, the stadium was renamed to First Community Stadium after a 20 year naming rights deal with First Community Credit Union was signed.

== Rivalries ==
=== Baylor ===
The schools both reside 183 miles from each other within the U.S. state of Texas. From 1915 to 1995, the teams were members of the Southwest Conference (SWC) and met on an annual basis from 1924 to 1995 with the exception of 1943 and 1944 due to World War II. From 1924 to 1975, the game was played exclusively on either the fourth weekend in November or the first weekend in December as the regular season finale for both teams, except for 1963 when Baylor's scheduled game against SMU and Rice's scheduled game against TCU were moved back two weeks from November 23 due to the assassination of John F. Kennedy in Dallas on November 22. After the Southwest Conference added Houston as a full-time member in 1976, the annual game between the Bears and Owls was moved to the middle of November where it was played through 1995, with the exception of 1991 when the game was played in mid-October.

After the breakup of the SWC following the 1995 season, Baylor was among the four SWC schools invited to join the new Big 12 Conference while Rice was left out. This brought an end to the annual rivalry between the Bears and Owls, but the teams have faced off intermittently since that time, most recently in 2019. The 2016 meeting between the schools was notable for a controversial halftime performance of the Marching Owl Band, who formed a Roman numeral IX in a mocking reference to Title IX and the Baylor University sexual assault scandal. The Rice University administration apologized the next day for the gesture. However, as of May 2025, there are no plans for the teams to meet again on the football field.

=== Houston ===
Rice participates in a crosstown rivalry with Houston. UH and Rice play annually for the Bayou Bucket, a weathered bucket found by former Rice guard Fred Curry at an antique shop. Curry had it designed into a trophy for $310. The two universities are separated by five miles in Houston. Despite being in separate conferences, the two teams still play as non-conference foes as future schedules allow.

Houston leads the series 35–12 as of 2025.

=== SMU ===
Rice and SMU were members of the same conference from 1918 through 2012, and have played each other 90 times as of 2012 with SMU leading the series 48–41–1. The rivalry is because Rice and SMU were two of four private schools in the Southwest Conference (Baylor and TCU were the others). Rice and SMU were also the two smallest schools in the conference, were located in the two largest cities of any teams in the conference (Houston and Dallas, respectively), and have historically been considered the two best private universities in Texas.

SMU leads the series 48–41–1 as of 2017.

=== Texas ===
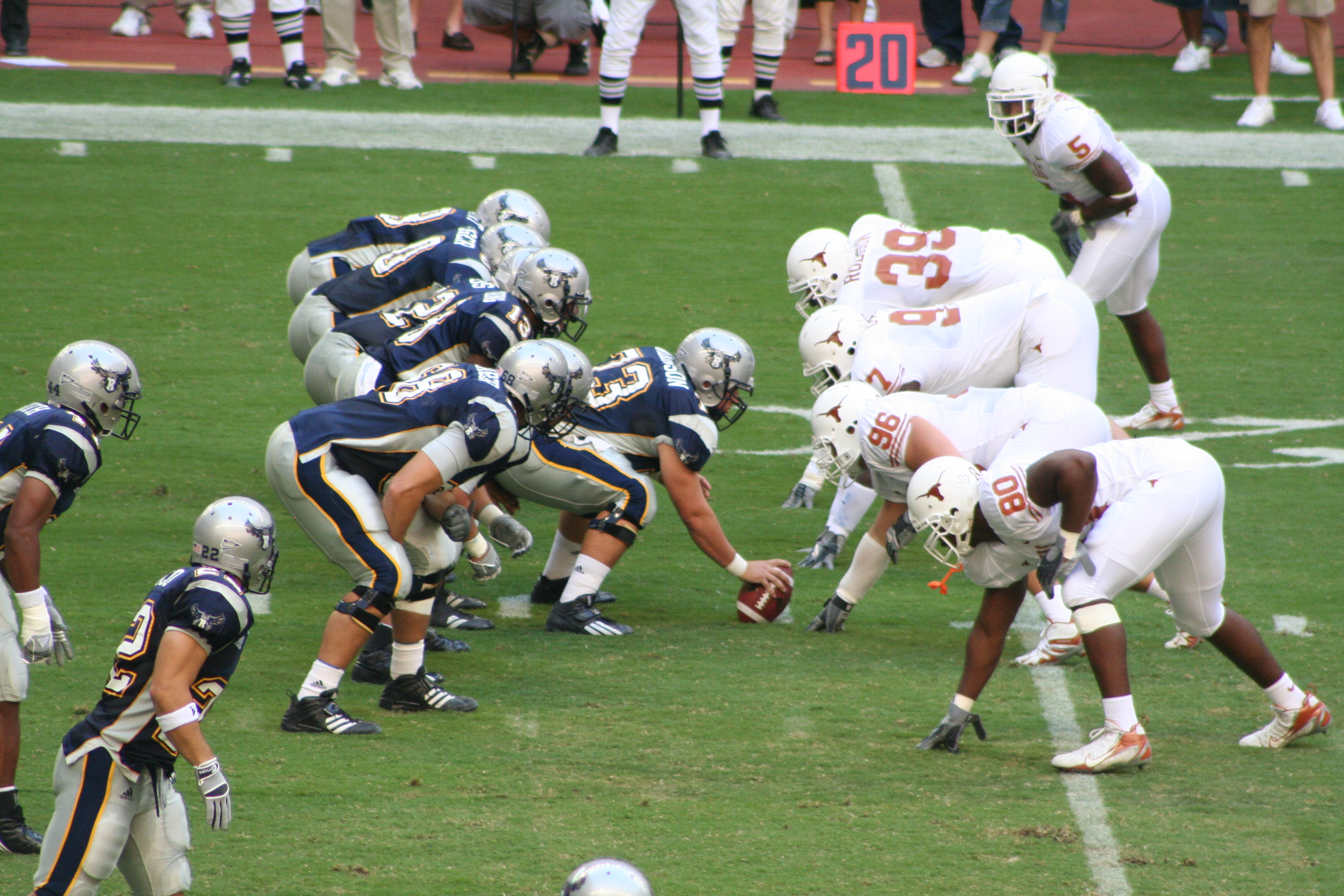
A game between Rice and Texas in 2006

Rice and Texas have maintained a largely one-sided rivalry beginning in the early days of the Southwest Conference. Texas' 28 consecutive victories from 1966 to 1993 represents the sixth longest single-opponent winning streak in college football history. In 1994, in a nationally televised ESPN game, Rice scored a major upset win over Texas, but since then Texas has resumed series dominance. Despite the dissolution of the Southwest Conference, Texas and Rice played on a "near annual" basis through much of Texas' Big 12 era, allowing the Longhorns to keep a high profile in the state's largest city and the fourth largest city in the United States.

Texas leads the series 75–21–1 as of the conclusion of the 2023 season.

== College Football Hall of Fame ==
Eight former Rice players and coaches have been inducted in the College Football Hall of Fame.

Name	Position	Career	Induction	Notes
John Heisman	Coach	1892–1927	1954	Inducted for his career as a coach at Oberlin, Akron, Auburn, Clemson, Georgia Tech, Pennsylvania, Washington & Jefferson, Rice
Weldon Humble	G	1941–1943, 1946	1961	He was a consensus All- America choice. Like most athletes of his time, Weldon was required to suspend his career for military service during World War II.
James "Froggy" Williams	End	1946–1949	1965	A consensus All-American and was also selected to the Cotton Bowl's All-Decade team for the 1950s
Jess Neely	Coach	1924–1966	1971	Inducted for his career as a coach at Rhodes, Clemson, Rice
Bill Wallace	HB	1932, 1934–1935	1978	Wallace was Rice's initial first team All-America selection
Dick Maegle	HB	1952–1954	1979	He was consensus All-America and academic All-America in 1954
Buddy Dial	End	1956–1958	1993	Team's co-captain, Most Valuable Player, and was consensus All-America
Tommy Kramer	QB	1972–1976	2012	Senior Bowl MVP and 1976 George Martin Award winner

== All-Americans ==
As of 2017, the following 18 players have been named All-America with 6 selection being consensus.

Name	Position	Year
Bill Wallace	B	1934
H.J. Nichols	G	1944
Weldon Humble †	G	1946
Froggy Williams †	E	1949
Joe Watson	C	1949
Bill Howton	E	1951
John Hudson	T	1953
Kosse Johnson	B	1953
Dicky Maegle †	HB	1954
King Hill	QB	1957
Buddy Dial †	E	1958
Malcolm Walker	C	1964
Tommy Kramer †	QB	1976
Steve Kidd	P	1985
Trevor Cobb	HB	1991,† 1992
Charles Torello	OG	1997
Jarett Dillard	WR	2006, 2008
Kyle Martens	P	2010

† Consensus selection

== Other notable players ==
- Tony Barker, LB Washington Redskins
- Chris Boswell, K Pittsburgh Steelers
- O.J. Brigance, LB multiple teams
- James Casey, TE/FB multiple teams
- Bryce Callahan, DB Chicago Bears
- Earl Cooper, RB San Francisco 49ers
- Vince Courville, WR multiple teams
- Christian Covington, DL Houston Texans
- Patrick Dendy, DB Green Bay Packers
- Buddy Dial, WR, multiple teams
- Jarett Dillard, WR Jacksonville Jaguars
- Michael Downs, S Dallas Cowboys
- Emmanuel Ellerbee, LB Seattle Seahawks
- Bert Emanuel, WR multiple teams
- Jack Fox, P Detroit Lions
- Phillip Gaines, DB multiple teams
- Darryl Grant, OL Washington Redskins
- Courtney Hall, OL San Diego Chargers
- King Hill, QB, multiple teams
- Donald Hollas, QB Oakland Raiders
- Larry Izzo, LB New England Patriots
- N.D. Kalu, DE multiple teams
- Tommy Kramer, QB Minnesota Vikings
- Taylor McHargue, QB (2010–2013), led Rice to back-to-back bowl appearances and its first outright conference title since 1953; currently a college football analyst for CBS Sports
- Luke McCaffrey, WR Washington Commanders
- LaDouphyous McCalla, DB Saskatchewan Roughriders
- Vance McDonald, TE Pittsburgh Steelers
- Primo Miller, T Cleveland Rams
- Cheta Ozougwu, DE, multiple teams
- Ryan Pontbriand, DS Cleveland Browns
- Tobin Rote, QB, Green Bay Packers
- Leo Rucka, LB, San Francisco 49ers
- Frank Ryan, QB Cleveland Browns
- Andrew Sendejo, DB Cleveland Browns
- Scott Solomon, DE multiple teams
- Seaman Squyres, HB Cincinnati Reds
- Jordan Taylor, WR Denver Broncos
- John Underwood, G Milwaukee Badgers
- Austin Walter, RB San Francisco 49ers
- Joe Watson, C/LB Detroit Lions
- Bones Weatherly, LB Chicago Bears
- Luke Willson, TE Seattle Seahawks
- Calvin Anderson, OL multiple teams

== Future non-conference opponents ==
Announced schedules as of July 8, 2025.

2026	2027	2028	2029	2030	2031	2032	2033	2034	2035
Houston Christian	Duke	UTRGV	Houston Christian	at Duke	at Northwestern	Boise State			at Boise State
at Notre Dame	Lamar	at UConn	at Toledo	San Jose State	Toledo				
Western Michigan	Fresno State		at LSU		at San Jose State				
at Fresno State	at Western Michigan		Northwestern						
