= Dwight Garner (American football) =

American football player (1964–2022)

No. 30
- Position: Running back

Personal information
- Born: October 25, 1964; San Francisco, California, U.S.
- Died: November 18, 2022 (aged 58); Florida, U.S.
- Listed height: 5 ft 8 in (1.73 m)
- Listed weight: 183 lb (83 kg)

Career information
- High school: Skyline (Oakland, California)
- College: California
- NFL draft: 1986: undrafted

Career history
- Washington Redskins (1986)

Awards and highlights
- Second-team All-Pac-10 (1983)
- Stats at Pro Football Reference

Dwight Eugene Garner (October 25, 1964 – November 18, 2022) was an American professional football player who was a kick returner for the Washington Redskins of the National Football League (NFL). He played college football as a running back and returner for the California Golden Bears. Garner was involved in The Play for Cal, in which they scored a game-winning touchdown against Stanford after five laterals on a kickoff return. He played in the NFL for Washington in 1986.

== Early life ==
Garner was born on October 25, 1964, in San Francisco. He attended Skyline High School in Oakland, California, and led the school to an Oakland Athletic League title. He had 400 yards of total offense and scored five touchdowns in the league championship game.

== Football career ==
Garner went to college at the University of California, Berkeley, and played for the Golden Bears as an 18-year-old freshman in 1982. On November 20, Cal faced their Bay Area rival, Stanford, in their annual Big Game. The Bears trailed 20–19 after a field goal by the Cardinal with four seconds remaining. On the ensuing kickoff return, known as The Play, Garner made the third of five Cal laterals to score a touchdown for a 25–20 win. His lateral to Richard Rodgers, as well as the final lateral of The Play, have been heavily scrutinized over whether they were legal; Garner made his pass while being tackled by several Stanford players, who maintain that Garner's knee touched the ground before he passed the ball, thereby ending the play at that point. The official closest to Garner at that moment, head linesman Jack Langley, later ruled that Garner's forward progress had not been halted. After the game, Garner maintained, "I was not down."

Garner finished his four-year career at Berkeley with 1,048 yards rushing and 120 receptions for 1,027 yards. He also had 51 kickoff returns for 958 yards, and returned 35 punts for 274 yards and a touchdown. He scored 10 touchdowns overall.

Garner joined the Washington Redskins in 1986 as a rookie free agent, and filled in as a kick returner during the season. In two regular season games, he returned seven kickoffs for 142 yards. He also played in three playoff games, returning five kicks for 98 yards. During the preseason in 1987, he was placed on injured reserve with a bruised foot.

== Later life ==
Garner became a risk manager for The Sports Authority in Coral Springs, Florida. He died in Florida from prostate cancer on November 18, 2022, two days before the 40th anniversary of The Play. He was 58.
