= Gordon Riese =

Former college basketball pitcher

Gordon Riese is a former college baseball pitcher in the 1960s who was inducted into the Portland State University Hall of Fame in 1997. He has spent the last 28 years as a Pac-10 Conference football official. He was the line judge during the 1982 Stanford-California game when "The Play" helped California win, 25-20. Many Stanford fans argue to this day that a forward lateral was made, and that a Cal player’s knee was down before his lateral, either of which by itself would have resulted in Stanford winning the game.

Riese later worked as a referee in the Pac-10 and was the head of the officiating crew that worked the first Bowl Championship Series championship game, the Fiesta Bowl between Florida State and Tennessee on January 4, 1999. His final game on the field came on January 1, 2005 at the Fiesta Bowl between Pitt and Utah.

On September 16, 2006 Riese served as the instant replay official of the University of Oklahoma-University of Oregon football game in Eugene, Oregon. During the final minutes of the game two plays were sent to his booth. The first was an onside kick by Oregon, which was ruled on the field to be a recovery by Oregon. The play went to the booth for review for the purpose of evaluating whether Oregon had illegally touched the ball before it had traveled 10 yards. Those watching the game at home were given multiple angles of the play, and many agreed with the broadcast commentators that Oregon had done so, which would give possession to the University of Oklahoma.

Riese was unable to determine if Oregon had touched the ball prematurely from the end zone replay angle he was shown, but he saw that Allen Patrick of Oklahoma had actually recovered the ball. Since the actual recovery was not the purpose of the review, Mr. Riese was limited to providing information within the original scope of the review, even though the referee asked him which team had recovered the ball. This ended up being a game-changing call: after Oregon was awarded the ball, it went on to score a touchdown, winning the game by a score of 34-33. Had Oklahoma been awarded possession of the onside kick, it likely would have run out the clock for a victory.

Following this incident, Riese was suspended, along with the rest of the officiating crew, for one game. After the incident, he requested and was granted a leave of absence for the remainder of the season. He was later quoted as saying, "I feel so bad I missed that call, it's driving me crazy," and that he was "struggling" with his mistake. Riese claimed to have received death threats, and during an interview on September 18, 2006, he remarked that, "I can't sleep, I can't eat, my blood pressure is skyrocketing."

Riese was considering retirement following the end of the season as recommended by his doctors. In February 2007 the Pac-10 Conference demoted Riese from replay official to technical assistant.
