= Shawn Hochuli =

American football official (born 1978)

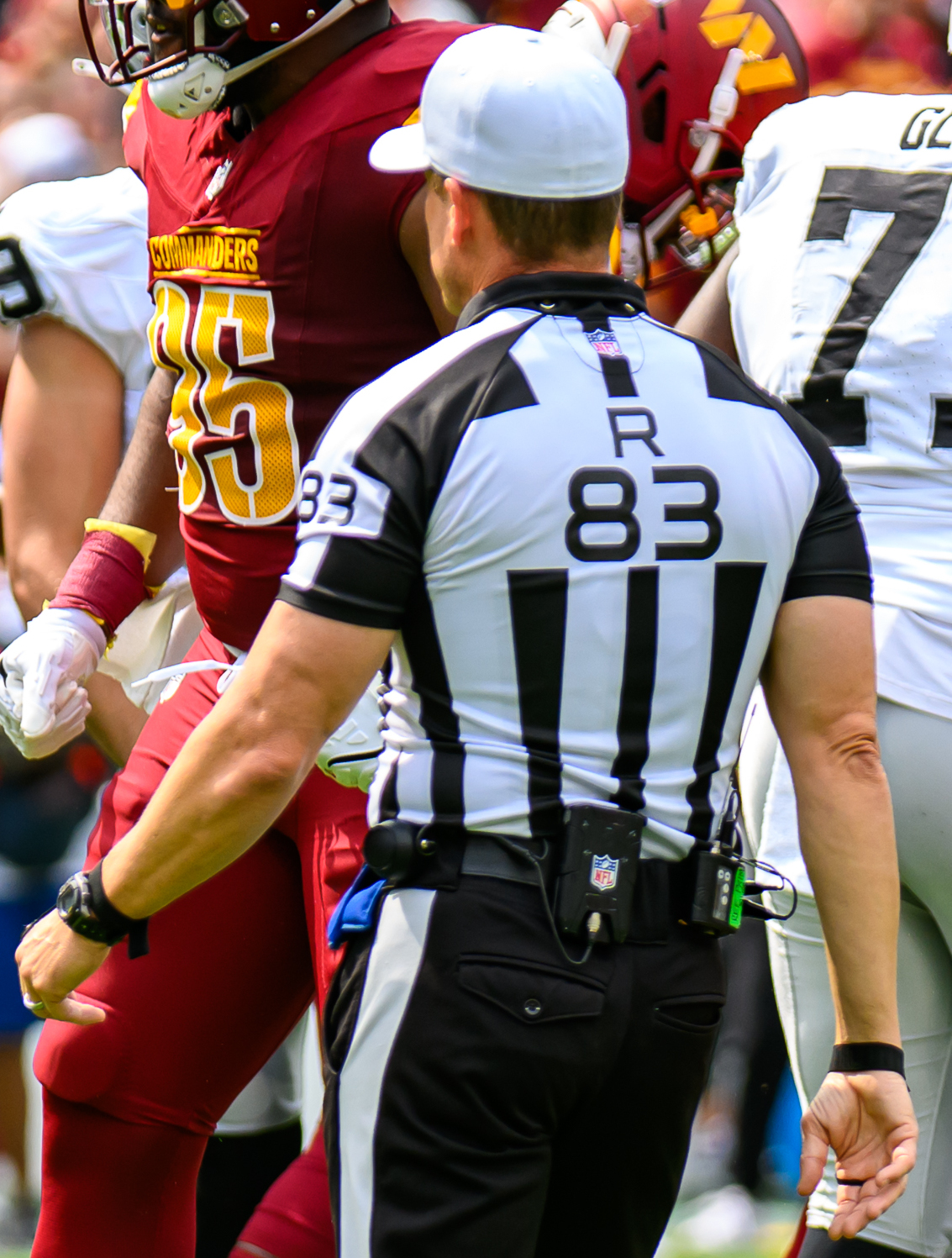
- Hochuli in 2025
- Born: June 25, 1978 (age 48); Tempe, Arizona, U.S.
- Occupation: NFL American football official (2014–present)
- Parent: Ed Hochuli

Shawn Hochuli (/ˈhɒkjʊli/ HOCK-yuu-lee; born June 25, 1978) is an American football official in the National Football League (NFL). He wears jersey #83. He entered the league in the 2014 NFL season and was promoted in 2018 from back judge to referee, following the retirement of his father, longtime referee Ed Hochuli, and another veteran official, Jeff Triplette.

Hochuli played college football at Pitzer College. Outside of the NFL, he has also worked as an official in the Pac-12 Conference, Arena Football League, and arenafootball2 games.

== Officiating career ==
=== NFL ===
Hochuli worked his first NFL season in 2014 as a side judge.

During the 2021 NFC Divisional playoff game between the Tampa Bay Buccaneers and the Los Angeles Rams, he gave Tom Brady the first unsportsmanlike conduct penalty of Brady's career.

On November 10, 2024, Hochuli made a false start penalty announcement in German, during an international contest between the Carolina Panthers and New York Giants in Munich. This referenced both Clay Martin's announcement from the previous year's Munich game, and his father's announcement from the inaugural Mexico game at Azteca Stadium on October 2, 2005.

During the 2024 NFC Championship Game, he invoked the rarely-used unfair acts rule whereby the Philadelphia Eagles were nearly awarded a touchdown due to multiple consecutive encroachment penalties from the Washington Commanders.

=== Other officiating ===
On August 13, 2011, he was head referee for ArenaBowl XXIV between the Jacksonville Sharks and Arizona Rattlers. He also worked as head referee for a 2017 pre-season game.

== 2024 crew ==
- R: Shawn Hochuli
- U: Terry Killens
- DJ: Patrick Holt
- LJ: Tim Podraza
- FJ: Jason Ledet
- SJ: Jim Quirk
- BJ: Jimmy Russell
- RO: Jamie Nicholson
- RA: Adam Choate
