= Henry Moore (American football) =

American football player (1934–2023)

No. 22, 27
- Positions: Defensive back, halfback

Personal information
- Born: April 3, 1934; Little Rock, Arkansas, U.S.
- Died: January 29, 2023 (aged 88); Little Rock, Arkansas, U.S.
- Listed height: 6 ft 1 in (1.85 m)
- Listed weight: 195 lb (88 kg)

Career information
- High school: Little Rock Central
- College: Arkansas (1952–1955)
- NFL draft: 1956: 2nd round, 19th overall pick

Career history
- New York Giants (1956); Baltimore Colts (1957)

Awards and highlights
- NFL champion (1956); Third-team All-American (1954); 2× First-team All-SWC (1954, 1955)

Career NFL statistics
- Games played: 16
- Games started: 3
- Interceptions: 1
- Stats at Pro Football Reference

Henry Dewell Moore (April 3, 1934 – January 29, 2023) was an American professional football player who was a defensive back and halfback in the National Football League (NFL). He played college football for the Arkansas Razorbacks. He played two seasons in the NFL for the New York Giants and the Baltimore Colts.

Moore died on January 29, 2023, at the age of 88.
