= Professional foul =

Sporting term

In various sports, a professional foul is a deliberate foul which curtails an imminent threat from the opposition, where the prescribed punishment for the foul is less damaging to the fouler than the opposition carrying out the threat would be. Professional fouls are usually committed to prevent an opponent from scoring.

Professional fouls are usually considered gamesmanship rather than cheating. Various sports contain provisions in their rules to deter them, either by negating the advantage gained from such an act or by applying additional punishment beyond that for a similar foul in normal circumstances.

== Association football ==
In association football, a professional foul involves a defender committing a foul in order to prevent the opponents from scoring, or to deny an obvious goal-scoring opportunity (DOGSO). The resulting free kick or penalty may offer the attacking team a lower chance of scoring than the original playing position, and the defending player therefore has an incentive to tactically commit the foul. Offending players are cautioned or sent off in accordance with the circumstances of the foul, with the punishment dependent upon both the nature of the foul and the opportunity denied to the opposition by it.

Under Law 12, what constitutes an obvious goalscoring opportunity is left to the discretion of the referee; however, several factors are given to help referees decide. These are the distance between the offence and the goal, the likelihood of keeping or gaining control of the ball, the direction of the play, and the location and number of defenders.

=== History ===
The concept gained attention in association football after an incident in the 1980 FA Cup Final when Willie Young of Arsenal committed a deliberate foul on Paul Allen of West Ham United, when Allen had a clear chance to score. As the Laws of the Game stood at the time, referee George Courtney could only caution Young and award West Ham a free kick, which he did. This provoked a national debate on deliberate fouls that denied opponents a clear run at goal.

At the time, the English game was suffering a downturn in attendances and the chairmen of the Football League clubs decided to consider ways in which the game could be made more exciting. A subcommittee was appointed to produce some suggestions, chaired by Jimmy Hill and including Matt Busby and Bobby Charlton. They recommended in 1982 that if the referee judges that a foul on an attacking player prevents an obvious scoring opportunity, the referee should issue the offending player a straight red card for "serious foul play" in order to deter offenders. However, the FA's refereeing committee abolished the rule in July 1983. The rule was finally fixed into the Laws of the Game by the International Football Association Board (IFAB) in 1990, and FIFA instructed referees working the 1990 World Cup to send players off for a DOGSO offence. In 1991 the IFAB made an addition which deemed that a player who committed a handling offence that denied an obvious goal-scoring opportunity should be sent off for serious foul play. For example, a goalkeeper who handles the ball outside the box can be sent off if it results in a DOGSO.

In 2016 the Laws of the Game were amended so that a foul resulting in a penalty kick would only result in a yellow card – providing that the player was making a genuine attempt for the ball – in order to reduce the "double jeopardy" of both a red card and a penalty kick. Referees are still permitted to send players off for serious misconduct committed in the penalty area, such as those where no attempt to legally play the ball was made.

== American football ==
In American football, the rules regarding unfair acts empower officials to enforce additional penalties so as to counteract the potential benefit a team may gain from a major or repeated foul.

In order to get a more favourable field position for a punt or to run the clock down while leading a game, it can happen that a team takes a delay of game penalty of five yards by running down the play clock on purpose. When looking for a lower field position for a punt, it is to prevent a touchback by having the punt go into the end zone.

== Basketball ==
In basketball, teams may deliberately commit personal fouls for strategic reasons. As the resulting free throws must be taken by the fouled player, teams may tactically choose to foul a player with a poor free-throw percentage. This became known as "Hack-a-Shaq" after Shaquille O'Neal who was a target of such tactics. Trailing teams often also commit intentional fouls late in games in order to stop the clock and get the ball back, rather than allow the opponent to run out the clock.

In addition, there are specific rules governing obvious goal scoring opportunities called clear path fouls.

== Rugby league ==
The professional foul in rugby league embodies a similar concept to other sports, a deliberate breach of the rules in order to prevent a scoring opportunity. The penalty for this offence is 10 minutes in the sin bin.

The majority of professional fouls are either holding down the tackled player after a break has been made in order to allow his teammates to reform in defence, interfering in the play when making little or no attempt to return to an onside position, or tackling or impeding the progress of a player not in possession when a try may possibly be scored. The latter situation may result in a penalty try.

== Rugby union ==
Law 10.2a of the Laws of Rugby deals with intentional infringements. Referees are instructed to award a penalty kick in such instances and admonish, caution (resulting in a temporary suspension from the game), or send off the offender. A penalty try can be awarded if the referee believes the offence probably prevented a try being scored.
