= Squib kick =

Type of American football kickoff

In gridiron football, a squib kick is a short, low, line drive kickoff that usually bounces around on the ground before it can be picked up by a member of the receiving team. The ball is kicked so short that it forces the receiving team's slower players to recover the ball first instead of their faster kick returner. Secondly, the unpredictably bouncing ball may be harder for the receiving team to pick up, allowing more time for kicking team members to get downfield to surround the ball carrier.

== History ==
The first recognized use of this by design in modern play was by the San Francisco 49ers during the 1981 season. On opening day, 49ers kicker Ray Wersching, due to an injured leg, was forced to kick the ball lightly on a kickoff at the Pontiac Silverdome against the Detroit Lions causing the ball to hit the ground instead of sailing through the air. The hard Astroturf surface of the Silverdome saw the spheroid-shaped football bounce oddly, sporadically, and was noticeably difficult for the receiving team to field. Its characteristics were that of an onside kick. Head coach Bill Walsh turned this predicament into design and used it later in Super Bowl XVI, also held at the Silverdome. Wersching made two squib kicks late in the first half. The first pinned the Bengals deep in their own territory, and after forcing a punt, the resulting good field position led to a 49ers field goal. Moments later, as time was running out in the half, Wersching made a second squib kick, and this time the Bengals muffed the ball, and the 49ers recovered. As time expired in the half, 49ers scored a last-second field goal.

Ahead of the 2024 season, the NFL changed the rules around kickoffs such that any kickoff that touched the ground before reaching the "landing zone" at the opponent's 20-yard line was considered a kickoff out of bounds and placed the ball at the opponent's 40-yard line, which effectively outlawed the squib kick in the NFL.

The squib kick is still allowed in Canadian football. One recent example was on August 31, 2025, when Trevor Harris, quarterback for the Saskatchewan Roughriders, made a low punt late in a game, resulting in one point when the opposing team player fielding the ball was forced into the end zone and tackled.

== Strategy ==
The squib kick is a tactic used to prevent a long return, usually at the end of the half. On average the receiving team will gain better field position than it would returning a normal kick. However, it may be considered worthwhile by the kicking team, as it is more difficult to return for a touchdown. Also it must be returned, which is not the case on a touchback, and thus it takes time off the clock and often brings the half to an end.

A squib kick can work against the kicking team, especially if the receiving team is expecting it. Because the kick is so short, the receiving team will usually get good field position, even if there is a minimal gain on the return. With moderate gain, the receiving team can find themselves in field goal territory quickly.

Squib kicks are also more difficult to pull off successfully than they were in the 1980s, since artificial turf has evolved to thicker, less bouncy installations such as FieldTurf. The unpredictable nature of a squib kick's bounce can also play against the kicking team if the ball inadvertently bounces out of bounds, giving the receiving team far better field position.

== Famous examples ==
Perhaps the most famous example of a squib kick is the controversial last-second kickoff return, nicknamed "The Play", during the November 20, 1982 college football game between the University of California, Berkeley ("California" or "Cal") Golden Bears and their arch-rival, the Stanford Cardinal. Stanford took the lead 20–19 with only four seconds remaining in the game. Anticipating a squib kick, Cal coach Joe Kapp sent his onsides return team into the game. The players recovered the ball and lateraled it five times — two of them controversial – to score a touchdown to win the game.

In Super Bowl XLI, the Indianapolis Colts decided to squib kick five of six subsequent kickoffs after Devin Hester of the Chicago Bears returned the opening kickoff for a touchdown. The Colts ended up winning 29–17. In Super Bowl XXXVII, the Tampa Bay Buccaneers used the squib kick on all of kickoffs against the Oakland Raiders, ending up in an overwhelming win for Tampa Bay.
