= John Roach (American football) =

American football player (1933–2021)

No. 12, 33, 10
- Positions: Quarterback, defensive back

Personal information
- Born: March 26, 1933; Dallas, Texas, U.S.
- Died: February 18, 2021 (aged 87)
- Listed height: 6 ft 4 in (1.93 m)
- Listed weight: 197 lb (89 kg)

Career information
- High school: Highland Park (Dallas)
- College: SMU (1952–1955)
- NFL draft: 1956: 3rd round, 31st overall pick

Career history
- Chicago / St. Louis Cardinals (1956, 1959–1960); Cleveland Browns (1961)*; Green Bay Packers (1961–1963); Dallas Cowboys (1964)
- * Offseason or practice squad member only

Awards and highlights
- 2× NFL champion (1961, 1962); Second-team All-SWC (1955)

Career NFL statistics
- Passing attempts: 413
- Passing completions: 182
- Completion percentage: 44.1%
- TD–INT: 24–37
- Passing yards: 2,765
- Passer rating: 48.7
- Stats at Pro Football Reference

John Gipson Roach (March 26, 1933 – February 18, 2021) was an American professional football player who was a quarterback and defensive back in the National Football League (NFL) for the Chicago/St. Louis Cardinals, Green Bay Packers, and Dallas Cowboys. He played college football for the SMU Mustangs.

== Early life ==
Born and raised in Dallas, Texas, Roach graduated from Highland Park High School in University Park, which had earlier produced hall of famers Bobby Layne and Doak Walker.

Roach accepted a football scholarship from Southern Methodist University. He played as a quarterback, defensive back and punter for the Mustangs, becoming a starter at quarterback as a senior.

== Professional career ==
=== Chicago / St. Louis Cardinals ===
Roach was selected by the Chicago Cardinals in the third round (31st overall) in the 1956 NFL draft. As a rookie, he was used at punter. After the season, he spent two years in the U.S. Air Force.

In 1959, he returned to the team and played as a defensive back, before being named the starting quarterback late in the year.

In 1960, he became the starting quarterback, after the team lost to injury two quarterbacks during their first season in St. Louis. On July 5, 1961, in a surprising move, he was sent to the Cleveland Browns in exchange for Halfback Prentice Gautt and rookie End Taz Anderson.

=== Cleveland Browns ===
On August 8, 1961, he was traded to the Green Bay Packers in exchange for a third round draft choice (#42-John Furman).

=== Green Bay Packers ===
Roach was the backup quarterback on the Packers' 1961 and 1962 NFL championship teams, backing up Bart Starr under head coach Vince Lombardi. In 1963, when Starr injured his passing hand in the sixth game against the St. Louis Cardinals, he was held out for 4 1/2 games and Roach was named the starter during those contests. The team was 4–1 with Starr sidelined and finished 11–2–1, but the 26–7 loss to the Chicago Bears in mid-November was critical; keeping them a half game back in the Western Conference final standings and denied the Packers a chance to win an unprecedented third consecutive NFL championship game.

He announced his retirement on May 20, 1964. On August 31, he was traded to the Dallas Cowboys in exchange for a third draft choice (#33-Bob Timberlake).

=== Dallas Cowboys ===
In 1964, Roach retired to work for an investment firm in Dallas, until the Dallas Cowboys convinced him to play in his home state. He was acquired after starting quarterback Don Meredith went down with a knee injury in the preseason game against the Green Bay Packers. He started in 4 games, passing for 349 yards, one touchdown and 6 interceptions.

== Death ==
John Roach died on February 18, 2021. At the time of his death, he was the only person to have played football for the Highland Park Scots, SMU Mustangs, and Dallas Cowboys.
