= John Tatum (Canadian football) =

Profile
- Positions: Center, Linebacker

Personal information
- Born: 1934 or 1935 (age 91–92); Lubbock, Texas, U.S.
- Listed height: 6 ft 0 in (1.83 m)
- Listed weight: 205 lb (93 kg)

Career information
- High school: Lubbock (TX)
- College: Texas
- NFL draft: 1956: 24th round, 286th overall pick

Career history
- 1956: Edmonton Eskimos
- 1959: Edmonton Eskimos

Awards and highlights
- Grey Cup champion (1956); 3× Second-team All-SWC (1953, 1954, 1955)

John P. Tatum (born c. 1935) is an American former professional football who won a Grey Cup with the Edmonton Eskimos. He is the father of John P. Tatum II, CEO of Genesco Sports Enterprises. He played college football at the University of Texas.

Out of college he was drafted by the Washington Redskins in the 24th round of the 1956 NFL draft (#286 overall), but he never signed with the team.

He signed with the Eskimos on May 20, 1956 and spent the season filling in for the injured Kurt Burris at center and playing linebacker on defense. He played in 16 games games, recording 2 interceptions, one of which he returned for 6 yards, and 3 fumble recoveries. He also played in all 4 playoff games. He helped the team win the 44th Grey Cup and in the title game he had a pass deflection and fumble recovery.

In 1957 he was called up to military service but he rejoined the team in August 1959.

In 1959, he played in one game before missing several weeks with a spine injury and then played in two more games. In mid-October he was removed from the roster to make room for Don Stephenson.
