= 1953 Arkansas Razorbacks football team =

American college football season

1953 Arkansas Razorbacks football
- Conference: Southwest Conference
- Record: 3–7 (2–4 SWC)
- Head coach: Bowden Wyatt (1st season)
- Captains: Jim Speering; Ralph Troillett
- Home stadium: Razorback Stadium; War Memorial Stadium

1953 Southwest Conference football standings
	Conf.					Overall
Team	W		L		T	W		L		T
No. 6 Rice +	5	–	1	–	0	9	–	2	–	0
No. 11 Texas +	5	–	1	–	0	7	–	3	–	0
Baylor	4	–	2	–	0	7	–	3	–	0
SMU	3	–	3	–	0	5	–	5	–	0
Arkansas	2	–	4	–	0	3	–	7	–	0
Texas A&M	1	–	5	–	0	4	–	5	–	1
TCU	1	–	5	–	0	3	–	7	–	0
+ – Conference co-champions; Rankings from AP Poll

The 1953 Arkansas Razorbacks football team represented the University of Arkansas as a member of the Southwest Conference (SWC) during the 1953 college football season. In their first year under head coach Bowden Wyatt, the Razorbacks compiled an overall record of 3–7 record with a mark of 2–4 against conference opponents, finished in fifth place in the SWC, and were outscored by their opponents by a combined total of 161 to 116.

Arkansas quarterback Lamar McHan finished ninth in the Heisman Trophy voting for 1953. McHan was sixth in the nation in yards per punt, and tied for sixth in punt return yards. Receiver Floyd Sagely's receiving stats were tied for sixth best in the country.

== Schedule ==
Date	Opponent	Site	Result	Attendance	Source
September 26	Oklahoma A&M*	War Memorial Stadium; Little Rock, AR	L 6–7	22,000	
October 3	TCU	Razorback Stadium; Fayetteville, AR	W 13–6	13,500	
October 10	at No. 9 Baylor	Baylor Stadium; Waco, TX	L 7–14	25,000	
October 17	Texas	Razorback Stadium; Fayetteville, AR (rivalry)	L 7–16	19,654	
October 24	vs. Ole Miss*	Crump Stadium; Memphis, TN (rivalry)	L 0–28	25,210	
October 31	Texas A&M	War Memorial Stadium; Little Rock, AR (rivalry)	W 41–14	20,500	
November 7	at Rice	Rice Stadium; Houston, TX	L 0–47	32,000	
November 14	at SMU	Cotton Bowl; Dallas, TX	L 7–13	26,500	
November 21	LSU*	War Memorial Stadium; Little Rock, AR (rivalry)	L 8–9	22,000	
November 28	Tulsa*	Razorback Stadium; Fayetteville, AR	W 27–7	8,500	
*Non-conference game; Rankings from AP Poll released prior to the game
