= 1953 TCU Horned Frogs football team =

American college football season

1953 TCU Horned Frogs football
- Conference: Southwest Conference
- Record: 3–7 (1–5 SWC)
- Head coach: Abe Martin (1st season)
- Offensive scheme: Meyer spread
- Home stadium: Amon G. Carter Stadium

1953 Southwest Conference football standings
	Conf.					Overall
Team	W		L		T	W		L		T
No. 6 Rice +	5	–	1	–	0	9	–	2	–	0
No. 11 Texas +	5	–	1	–	0	7	–	3	–	0
Baylor	4	–	2	–	0	7	–	3	–	0
SMU	3	–	3	–	0	5	–	5	–	0
Arkansas	2	–	4	–	0	3	–	7	–	0
Texas A&M	1	–	5	–	0	4	–	5	–	1
TCU	1	–	5	–	0	3	–	7	–	0
+ – Conference co-champions; Rankings from AP Poll

The 1953 TCU Horned Frogs football team represented Texas Christian University (TCU) in the 1953 college football season. The Horned Frogs finished the season 3–7 overall and 1–5 in the Southwest Conference. The team was coached by Abe Martin in his first year as head coach. The Frogs played their home games in Amon G. Carter Stadium, which is located on campus in Fort Worth, Texas.

== Schedule ==
Date	Opponent	Site	Result	Attendance	Source
September 19	Kansas*	Amon G. Carter Stadium; Fort Worth, TX	W 13–0	26,000	
October 3	at Arkansas	Razorback Stadium; Fayetteville, AR	L 6–13	13,500	
October 10	at No. 2 Michigan State*	Macklin Stadium; East Lansing, MI	L 19–26	51,049	
October 17	Texas A&M	Amon G. Carter Stadium; Fort Worth, TX (rivalry)	L 7–20	32,000	
October 24	at Penn State*	New Beaver Field; University Park, PA	L 21–27	27,966	
October 31	at No. 3 Baylor	Baylor Stadium; Waco, TX (rivalry)	L 7–25	30,000	
November 7	at Washington State*	Memorial Stadium; Spokane, WA	W 21–7	17,500	
November 14	at No. 10 Texas	Memorial Stadium; Austin, TX (rivalry)	L 3–13	42,000	
November 21	No. 10 Rice	Amon G. Carter Stadium; Fort Worth, TX	L 6–19	20,000	
November 28	SMU	Amon G. Carter Stadium; Fort Worth, TX (rivalry)	W 13–0	27,000	
*Non-conference game; Rankings from AP Poll released prior to the game
