= Bud Brooks =

American football player (1930–2005)

No. 64
- Position: Guard

Personal information
- Born: September 6, 1930; Wynne, Arkansas, U.S.
- Died: January 6, 2005 (aged 74); Bauxite, Arkansas, U.S.
- Listed height: 6 ft 0 in (1.83 m)
- Listed weight: 210 lb (95 kg)

Career information
- College: Arkansas
- NFL draft: 1955: 5th round, 60th overall pick

Career history
- Detroit Lions (1955)

Awards and highlights
- Outland Trophy (1954); Unanimous All-American (1954); First-team All-SWC (1954)

Career NFL statistics
- Games played: 1
- Games started: 1
- Stats at Pro Football Reference

William "Bud" Brooks was an American professional football player for the Arkansas Razorbacks and the winner of the 1954 Outland Trophy as the year's best interior lineman.

Brooks played guard and defensive tackle for the Razorbacks and was selected first-team All-American following the 1954 college season by the Associated Press, the American Football Coaches Association, the Football Writers Association of America and the Walter Camp Foundation.

Brooks was selected most valuable player for the South team in the 1955 Senior Bowl. He was drafted by the Detroit Lions in the fifth round of the 1955 NFL draft and played in one regular season game for the Lions in 1955.

== See also ==
- 1954 College Football All-America Team
