= Ed Bernet =

American football player (born 1933)

No. 83, 85
- Position: Wide receiver

Personal information
- Born: October 24, 1933 (age 93); Dallas, Texas, U.S.
- Listed height: 6 ft 3 in (1.91 m)
- Listed weight: 203 lb (92 kg)

Career information
- High school: Highland Park (University Park, Texas)
- College: SMU (1951–1954)
- NFL draft: 1955: 3rd round, 30th overall pick

Career history
- Pittsburgh Steelers (1955); Dallas Texans (1960)

Awards and highlights
- Second-team All-SWC (1953)

Career NFL/AFL statistics
- Receptions: 26
- Receiving yards: 325
- Touchdowns: 1
- Stats at Pro Football Reference

Edward Nelson Bernet (born October 24, 1933) is an American country singer and former professional football player. He played in the National Football League (NFL) and American Football League (AFL) as a wide receiver.

Bernet played college football for the SMU Mustangs before playing for the NFL's Pittsburgh Steelers in 1955, then returned to his hometown in 1960 to play for the AFL's Dallas Texans. After retire, he formed country group the Levee Singers. He performed Truck driving country and road music.

== See also ==
- List of American Football League players
