= 1953 SMU Mustangs football team =

American college football season

1953 SMU Mustangs football
- Conference: Southwest Conference
- Record: 5–5 (3–3 SWC)
- Head coach: Woody Woodard (1st season)
- Captains: Jack Gunlock; Jerry Clem
- Home stadium: Cotton Bowl

1953 Southwest Conference football standings
	Conf.					Overall
Team	W		L		T	W		L		T
No. 6 Rice +	5	–	1	–	0	9	–	2	–	0
No. 11 Texas +	5	–	1	–	0	7	–	3	–	0
Baylor	4	–	2	–	0	7	–	3	–	0
SMU	3	–	3	–	0	5	–	5	–	0
Arkansas	2	–	4	–	0	3	–	7	–	0
Texas A&M	1	–	5	–	0	4	–	5	–	1
TCU	1	–	5	–	0	3	–	7	–	0
+ – Conference co-champions; Rankings from AP Poll

The 1953 SMU Mustangs football team represented Southern Methodist University (SMU) as a member of the Southwest Conference (SWC) during the 1953 college football season. Led by first-year head coach Woody Woodard, the Mustangs compiled an overall record of 5–5 with a mark of 3–3 in conference play, placing fourth in the SWC. SMU played home games at the Cotton Bowl in Dallas. Jack Gunlock and Jerry Clem were the team captains.

== Schedule ==
Date	Opponent	Rank	Site	Result	Attendance	Source
October 3	at No. 9 Georgia Tech*		Grant Field; Atlanta, GA	L 4–6	37,000	
October 9	Missouri*		Cotton Bowl; Dallas, TX	W 20–7	35,000	
October 17	No. 11 Rice		Cotton Bowl; Dallas, TX (rivalry)	W 12–7	50,000	
October 24	at Kansas*	No. 13	Memorial Stadium; Lawrence, KS	W 14–6	29,000	
October 31	Texas	No. 11	Cotton Bowl; Dallas, TX	L 7–16	51,000	
November 7	at Texas A&M		Kyle Field; College Station, TX	W 23–0	20,000	
November 14	Arkansas		Cotton Bowl; Dallas, TX	W 13–7	26,500	
November 21	at Baylor		Baylor Stadium; Waco, TX	L 21–27	30,000	
November 28	at TCU		Amon G. Carter Stadium; Fort Worth, TX (rivalry)	L 0–13	27,000	
December 5	at No. 2 Notre Dame*		Notre Dame Stadium; Notre Dame, IN	L 14–40	55,522	
*Non-conference game; Rankings from AP Poll released prior to the game

== Personnel ==
- Raymond Berry
