= 1954 All-Southwest Conference football team =

American college football all-star team

The 1954 All-Southwest Conference football team consists of American football players chosen by various organizations for All-Southwest Conference teams for the 1954 college football season. The selectors for the 1954 season included the Associated Press (AP) and the United Press (UP). Players selected as first-team players by both the AP and UP are designated in bold.

== All Southwest selections ==
=== Backs ===
- **Frank Eidom**, SMU (AP-1 [HB]; UP-1)
- **Dicky Moegle**, Rice (AP-1 [HB]; UP-1) (College Football Hall of Fame)
- **Henry Moore**, Arkansas (AP-1 [FB]; UP-1)
- Billy Hooper, Baylor (AP-1 [QB]; UP-2)
- Elwood Kettler, Texas A&M (UP-1)
- Jim Swink, TCU (UP-2)
- Del Shofner, Baylor (UP-2)
- George Walker, Arkansas (UP-2)
- Don Kachtik, Texas A&M (UP-2)

=== Ends ===
- **Hank Gremminger**, Baylor (AP-1; UP-1)
- **Bennie Sinclair**, Texas A&M (AP-1; UP-1)
- Raymond Berry, SMU (UP-2)
- Lamoine Holland, Rice (UP-2)

=== Tackles ===
- **Jim Ray Smith**, Baylor (AP-1; UP-1) (College Football Hall of Fame)
- Buck Lansford, Texas (AP-1; UP-2)
- Eddie Rayburn, Rice (UP-1)
- Forrest Gregg, SMU (UP-2)

=== Guards ===
- **Bud Brooks**, Arkansas (AP-1; UP-1)
- **Kenny Paul**, Rice (AP-1; UP-1)
- Eddie Bradford, Arkansas (UP-2)
- Clarence Dierking, Baylor (UP-2)

=== Centers ===
- **Hugh Pitts**, TCU (AP-1; UP-1)
- John Tatum, Texas (UP-2)

== Key ==
AP = Associated Press

UP = United Press

Bold = Consensus first-team selection of both the AP and UP

== See also ==
- 1954 College Football All-America Team
