= Bryan Engram =

American gridiron football player (born 1934)

Profile
- Position: End

Personal information
- Born: September 26, 1934 (age 92); Dumas, Texas, U.S.
- Listed height: 6 ft 1 in (1.85 m)
- Listed weight: 200 lb (91 kg)

Career information
- College: Texas Christian

Career history
- 1956–1958: Calgary Stampeders

Awards and highlights
- Second-team All-SWC (1955)

Bryan Engram (born September 26, 1934) is a former professional Canadian football player who played for the Calgary Stampeders from 1956 to 1958. Engram was selected 279th overall by the Pittsburgh Steelers in the 24th round of the 1956 NFL draft before opting for the Canadian Football League (CFL). Before his career in the CFL, he was an All-American End for Texas Christian University. As captain and team MVP he led the 1955 Horned Frogs to a 9–2 record, a Cotton Bowl appearance, and a No. 6 ranking in the Coaches and AP polls. In 1994, Engram was honored with the prestigious Frog O'Fame Award for his collegiate career. He was also inducted into the TCU Lettermen's Hall of Fame in 1995. In 2015, Engram was inducted into the Dumas, Texas Sports Hall of Fame for his high school athletic career. As a high school athlete he served as team captain and lettered in football, basketball, and baseball. After high school, Engram was offered a basketball scholarship to play Forward for the Texas Tech Red Raiders, but opted to play football for Texas Christian instead. Engram signed with the AFL's Houston Oilers in their inaugural 1960 season, but tore his hamstring just before training camp. Shortly after, Engram announced his retirement from professional football. He has since gone on to become a serial entrepreneur and an avid golfer living in the Dallas, Texas area.
