= 1953 All-Southwest Conference football team =

American college football all-star team

The 1953 All-Southwest Conference football team consists of American football players chosen by various organizations for All-Southwest Conference teams for the 1953 college football season. The selectors for the 1953 season included the Associated Press (AP) and the United Press (UP). Players selected as first-team players by both the AP and UP are designated in bold.

== All Southwest selections ==
=== Backs ===
- **Don Ellis**, Texas A&M (AP-1 [QB]; UP-1)
- **Lamar McHan**, Arkansas (AP-1 [HB]; UP-1)
- **Jerry Coody**, Baylor (AP-1 [HB]; UP-1)
- **Kosse Johnson**, Rice (AP-1; UP-1)
- Cotton Davidson, Baylor (UP-2 [QB])
- L.G. Dupre, Baylor (AP-2, UP-2)
- Dicky Moegle, Rice (AP-2, UP-2)
- Frank Eidom, Southern Methodist (UP-2)

=== Ends ===
- **Carlton Massey**, Texas (AP-1; UP-1)
- **Floyd Sagely**, Arkansas (AP-1; UP-1)
- Gilmer Spring, Texas (AP-2; UP-2)
- Ed Bernet, Southern Methodist (AP-2; UP-2)

=== Tackles ===
- **Dick Chapman**, Rice (AP-1; UP-1)
- **Jim Ray Smith**, Baylor (AP-1; UP-1) (College Football Hall of Fame)
- Don Gross, Southern Methodist (AP-2)
- Dougal Cameron, Texas (AP-2)
- Herb Gray, Texas (UP-2)
- Jack Gunlock, Southern Methodist (UP-2)

=== Guards ===
- **Morgan Williams**, TCU (AP-1; UP-1)
- **Phil Branch**, Texas (AP-1; UP-1)
- Kenneth Paul, Rice (UP-2)
- Clarence Dierking, Baylor (UP-2)

=== Centers ===
- **Leo Rucka**, Rice (AP-1; UP-1)
- John Tatum, Texas (UP-2)

== Key ==
AP = Associated Press

UP = United Press

Bold = Consensus first-team selection of both the AP and UP

== See also ==
- 1953 College Football All-America Team
