= 1955 All-Southwest Conference football team =

American college football all-star team

The 1955 All-Southwest Conference football team consists of American football players chosen by various organizations for All-Southwest Conference teams for the 1955 college football season. The selectors for the 1955 season included the Associated Press (AP) and the United Press (UP). Players selected as first-team players by both the AP and UP are designated in bold.

== All Southwest selections ==
=== Backs ===
- Chuck Curtis, TCU (AP-1)
- Jim Swink, TCU (AP-1)
- Preston Carpenter, Arkansas (AP-1)
- Walter Fondren, Texas (AP-1)
- Henry Moore, Arkansas (AP-1)
- George Walker, Arkansas (AP-2)
- Delano Womack, Texas (AP-2)
- John Roach, SMU (AP-2)
- Jack Pardee, Texas A&M (AP-2)

=== Ends ===
- Menan Schriewer, Texas (AP-1)
- Hank Gremminger, Baylor (AP-1)
- Gene Stallings, Texas A&M (AP-1)
- Bryan Engram, TCU (AP-2)
- Marshall Crawford, Rice (AP-2)

=== Tackles ===
- Forrest Gregg, SMU (AP-1)
- Norman Hamilton, TCU (AP-1)
- Jack Powell, Texas A&M (AP-2)
- Bill Fuller, Arkansas (AP-2)

=== Guards ===
- Herb Gray, Texas (AP-1)
- Dennis Goehring, Texas A&M (AP-1)
- Wayland Roberts, Arkansas (AP-2)
- Don Goss, SMU (AP-2)

=== Centers ===
- Hugh Pitts, TCU (AP-1)
- John Tatum, Texas (AP-2)

== Key ==
AP = Associated Press

UP = United Press

Bold = Consensus first-team selection of both the AP and UP

== See also ==
- 1955 College Football All-America Team
