= Billy Hooper =

American football player (1931–1981)

Profile
- Position: Quarterback

Personal information
- Born: November 21, 1931; Sweetwater, Texas, U.S.
- Died: July 27, 1981 (aged 49); Bexar County, Texas, U.S.
- Listed height: 5 ft 11 in (1.80 m)
- Listed weight: 185 lb (84 kg)

Career information
- College: Baylor
- NFL draft: 1955: 26th round, 302nd overall pick

Career history
- 1955: Winnipeg Blue Bombers

Awards and highlights
- First-team All-SWC (1954)

Horace Chilton Hooper, Jr. (November 21, 1931 – July 27, 1981), better known as Billy Hooper, was an American professional football player who played for the Winnipeg Blue Bombers. He played college football at Baylor University.
