= Preston Carpenter =

American football player (1934–2011)

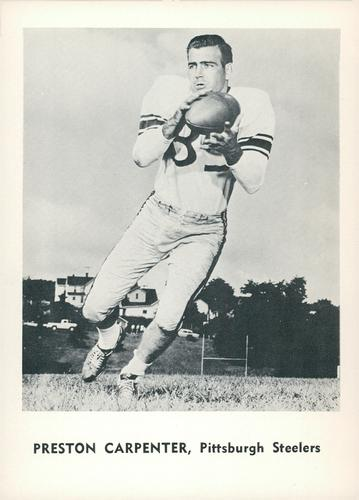

No. 40, 89, 36
- Positions: End, halfback, tight end, return specialist

Personal information
- Born: January 24, 1934; Hayti, Missouri, U.S.
- Died: June 30, 2011 (aged 77); Tulsa, Oklahoma, U.S.
- Listed height: 6 ft 2 in (1.88 m)
- Listed weight: 190 lb (86 kg)

Career information
- High school: West Memphis (West Memphis, Arkansas)
- College: Arkansas
- NFL draft: 1956: 1st round, 13th overall pick

Career history
- Cleveland Browns (1956–1959); Pittsburgh Steelers (1960–1963); Washington Redskins (1964–1966); Minnesota Vikings (1966); Miami Dolphins (1967)

Awards and highlights
- Pro Bowl (1962); First-team All-SWC (1955)

Career NFL/AFL statistics
- Receptions: 305
- Receiving yards: 4,457
- Rushing yards: 884
- Rushing average: 4
- Total touchdowns: 24
- Stats at Pro Football Reference

Verba Preston Carpenter (January 24, 1934 – June 30, 2011) was an American professional football player. He played as an end, halfback, tight end, and kick returner over eleven seasons for five different teams in the National Football League (NFL) and the American Football League (AFL). Carpenter played college football at the University of Arkansas for the Razorbacks.

== Family ==
Carpenter was born to Verba Glen Carpenter and Edna Earl Pullam in Hayti, Missouri. He graduated from Muskogee Central High School, where he was Oklahoma All State. His brother, Lew Carpenter, played and coached in the NFL for over forty years.

Carpenter married Jeanne Etychison (d. 2019). The couple had three children: Scott, Bruce (d. 2015) and Lewis Todd Carpenter. He is a descendant of Thomas "Jack" Carpenter (1740–1803).

== College career ==
At the University of Arkansas, Carpenter was an outstanding single-wing blocking back and linebacker for the Razorbacks in 1953 and 1954. In 1954, he caught a 66-yard touchdown pass against Ole Miss in one of the most famous plays in Razorbacks history. He was an All-Southwest Conference selection in 1955 as a halfback.

== NFL football ==
Carpenter played 12 seasons in the NFL. He was a Pro Bowl selection as a Pittsburgh Steeler tight end in 1962. Carpenter also played for Miami, Washington and Minnesota.

=== Cleveland Browns ===
A first-round draft choice in 1956, Carpenter was selected by the reigning NFL champion Cleveland Browns, who picked thirteenth. The Browns used him primarily as a halfback in his rookie year, when he gained 756 yards on 188 carries while averaging 25.4 yds/touch on 15 kickoff returns. In 1957–1959, he was used mainly as a receiver, where in four years, he accrued 1,366 yards and five touchdowns. Carpenter led the Cleveland Browns in rushing in 1956 and receiving in 1958.

=== Pittsburgh Steelers ===
With the Pittsburgh Steelers, in his first year, he also averaged over 25 yards/touch on kickoff returns, and from 1960 through 1963 with Pittsburgh, he picked up another 1,680 yards and 11 touchdowns on receptions, making the NFL Pro Bowl in 1962.

=== Final pro years ===
From 1964 through 1966 with the Washington Redskins and Minnesota Vikings, Carpenter gained another 1,281 yards and seven touchdowns receiving. He completed his pro football career with the American Football League's Miami Dolphins in 1967. His career record includes a combined 6,253 receiving, rushing, and return yards, with a 25.9 yards/touch career average on kickoff returns, and a total of 24 touchdowns: 23 rushing and one receiving.

== NFL/AFL career statistics ==
Legend
**Bold**	Career high

=== Regular season ===
Year	Team	Games		Receiving				
Year	Team	GP	GS	Rec	Yds	Avg	Lng	TD
1956	CLE	12	8	16	124	7.8	34	0
1957	CLE	12	12	27	398	14.7	33	2
1958	CLE	12	12	29	474	16.3	**74**	1
1959	CLE	12	12	24	372	15.5	43	2
1960	PIT	12	11	29	**495**	17.1	70	2
1961	PIT	13	12	33	460	13.9	40	**4**
1962	PIT	13	12	**36**	492	13.7	43	**4**
1963	PIT	14	14	17	233	13.7	28	1
1964	WAS	14	11	31	466	15.0	39	3
1965	WAS	9	9	23	298	13.0	36	0
1966	WAS	1	1	3	31	10.3	17	0
1966	MIN	12	12	27	487	**18.0**	52	**4**
1967	MIA	13	1	10	127	12.7	42	0
		149	127	305	4,457	14.6	74	23

=== Playoffs ===
Year	Team	Games		Receiving				
Year	Team	GP	GS	Rec	Yds	Avg	Lng	TD
1957	CLE	1	1	**4**	**43**	**10.8**	**18**	0
1958	CLE	1	1	2	18	9.0	12	0
		2	2	6	61	10.2	18	0

== Honors ==
Carpenter was inducted into the Arkansas Sports Hall of Fame in 1992. Carpenter was inducted into the University of Arkansas Sports Hall of Honor in 1996. Carpenter also received The All-American Football Foundation's All-American Football Legends Award on July 25, 2003.

== See also ==
- List of American Football League players
