= Floyd Sagely =

American football player (1932–2021)

No. 89, 88
- Positions: Defensive back, end

Personal information
- Born: March 26, 1932; Rudy, Arkansas, U.S.
- Died: September 22, 2021 (aged 89); Fort Smith, Arkansas, U.S.
- Listed height: 6 ft 1 in (1.85 m)
- Listed weight: 191 lb (87 kg)

Career information
- High school: Van Buren (Van Buren, Arkansas)
- College: Arkansas
- NFL draft: 1954: 6th round, 71st overall pick

Career history
- San Francisco 49ers (1954, 1956); Chicago Cardinals (1957)

Awards and highlights
- First-team All-SWC (1953)

Career NFL statistics
- Interceptions: 1
- Fumble recoveries: 1
- Stats at Pro Football Reference

Floyd Eugene Sagely (March 26, 1932 – September 22, 2021) was an American professional football player who played for San Francisco 49ers and Chicago Cardinals of the National Football League (NFL). He played college football at the University of Arkansas.
