= 1953 Texas A&M Aggies football team =

American college football season

1953 Texas A&M Aggies football
- Conference: Southwest Conference
- Record: 4–5–1 (1–5 SWC)
- Head coach: Raymond George (3rd season)
- Home stadium: Kyle Field

1953 Southwest Conference football standings
	Conf.					Overall
Team	W		L		T	W		L		T
No. 6 Rice +	5	–	1	–	0	9	–	2	–	0
No. 11 Texas +	5	–	1	–	0	7	–	3	–	0
Baylor	4	–	2	–	0	7	–	3	–	0
SMU	3	–	3	–	0	5	–	5	–	0
Arkansas	2	–	4	–	0	3	–	7	–	0
Texas A&M	1	–	5	–	0	4	–	5	–	1
TCU	1	–	5	–	0	3	–	7	–	0
+ – Conference co-champions; Rankings from AP Poll

The 1953 Texas A&M Aggies football team represented Texas A&M University in the 1953 college football season as a member of the Southwest Conference (SWC). The Aggies were led by head coach Raymond George in his third season and finished with a record of four wins, five losses and one tie (4–5–1 overall, 1–5 in the SWC).

== Schedule ==
Date	Opponent	Rank	Site	Result	Attendance	Source
September 19	at Kentucky*		McLean Stadium; Lexington, KY	W 7–6	35,000	
September 26	Houston*		Kyle Field; College Station, TX	T 14–14	35,000	
October 3	vs. No. 18 Georgia*		Cotton Bowl; Dallas, TX	W 14–12	22,342	
October 10	at Texas Tech*		Jones Stadium; Lubbock, TX (rivalry)	W 27–14	26,114	
October 17	at TCU		Amon G. Carter Stadium; Fort Worth, TX (rivalry)	W 20–7	32,000	
October 24	No. 6 Baylor	No. 15	Kyle Field; College Station, TX (rivalry)	L 13–14	36,000	
October 31	at Arkansas		War Memorial Stadium; Little Rock, AR (rivalry)	L 14–41	20,500	
November 7	SMU		Kyle Field; College Station, TX	L 0–23	20,000	
November 14	at No. 16 Rice		Rice Stadium; Houston, TX	L 7–34	57,500	
November 26	No. 7 Texas		Kyle Field; College Station, TX (rivalry)	L 12–21	42,000	
*Non-conference game; Rankings from AP Poll released prior to the game
