= Kosse Johnson =

American football player (1932–1996)

Profile
- Position: Fullback

Personal information
- Born: July 13, 1932; Kosse, Texas, U.S.
- Died: September 3, 1996 (aged 64); San Antonio, U.S.

Career information
- College: Rice
- NFL draft: 1954: 14th round, 159th overall pick

Awards and highlights
- First-team All-American (1953); First-team All-SWC (1953)

David "Kosse" Johnson (July 13, 1932 – September 3, 1996) was an American football player. He played college football for Rice, led the Southwest Conference in rushing and scoring in 1953, and was selected as a first-team back on the 1953 All-America college football team.

== Early year ==
Johnson was born in 1932 in Kosse, Texas. He moved with his family to Baytown, Texas, in 1942. He played football at Baytown Junior High School and Robert E. Lee High School in Baytown.

== Rice University ==
He played college football at the fullback position for the Rice Owls football team from 1950 to 1953. He became Rice's second-leading career rusher with 1,907 rushing yards and 17 touchdowns. In the fall of 1953, he led the Southwest Conference in both rushing yards (944) and scoring (62 points) during the regular season. He was also rated as a great punter and played at the linebacker position on defense. He was selected by the Associated Press, the Football Writers Association of America, and Look magazine as a first-team player on their respective 1953 College Football All-America Teams.

== Family and later years ==
Johnson married Barbara Sue Bradbury in February 1953 while still a student at Rice. He later worked as a high school football coach in Texas. He was inducted into the Rice Athletic Hall of Fame in 1972.

Johnson died in 1996 at age 64 in San Antonio due to complication from cancer.
