= 1954 Cotton Bowl Classic =

- 18th Cotton Bowl Classic "12th Man Tackle Game"
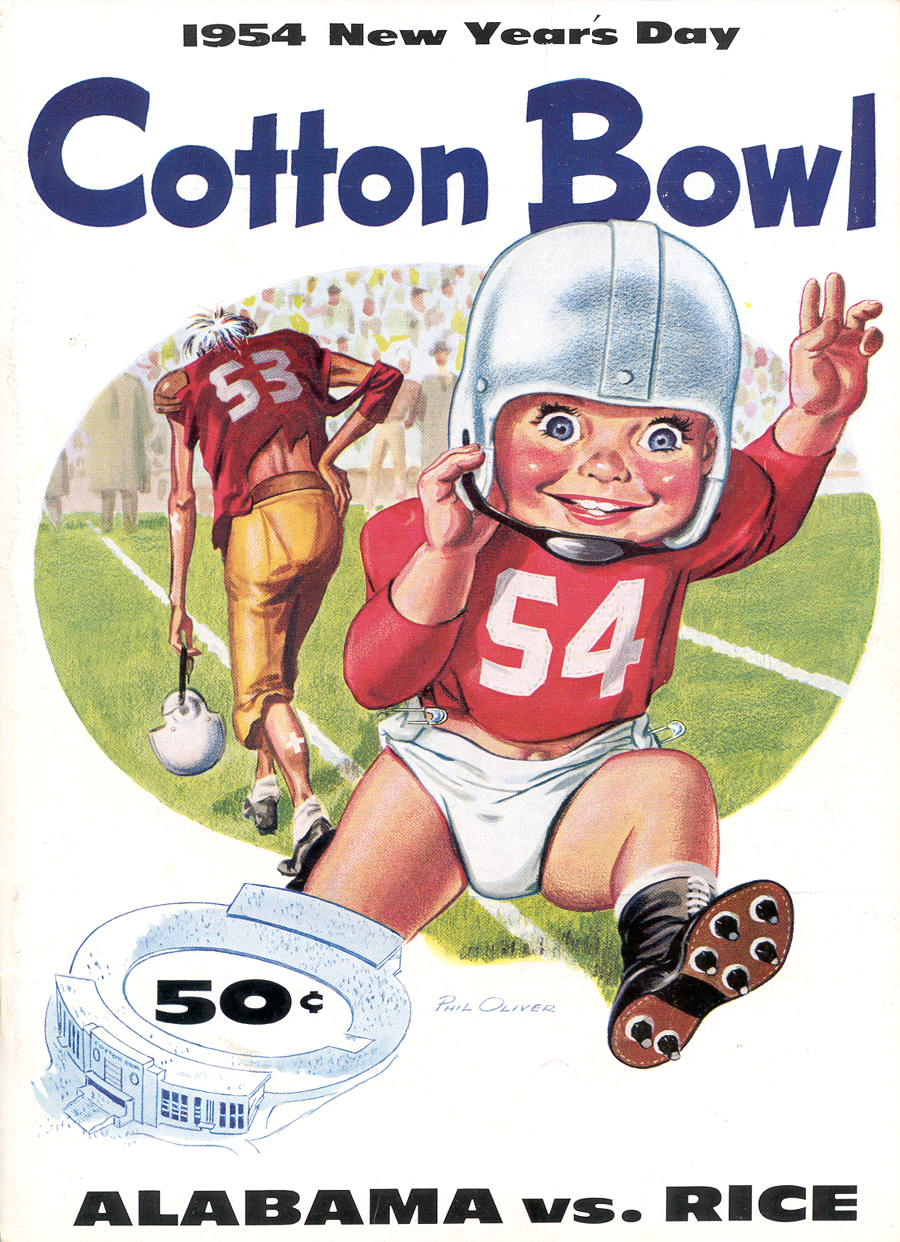
Alabama Crimson Tide	Rice Owls
(6–2–3)	(8–2)
SEC	SWC
6	28
Head coach: Harold Drew	Head coach: Jess Neely
AP / Coaches; 13 / 11	AP / Coaches; 6 / 6
	1	2	3	4	Total
Alabama	6	0	0	0	6
Rice	0	14	7	7	28
- Date: January 1, 1954
- Season: 1953
- Stadium: Cotton Bowl
- Location: Dallas, Texas
- MVP: T Richard Chapman (Rice); End Dan Hart (Rice); HB Dickey Maegle (Rice)
- Referee: Cliff Shaw (SWC; split crew: SWC, SEC)
- Attendance: 75,504

United States TV coverage
- Network: NBC

The Cotton Bowl in Dallas, Texas, hosted the Cotton Bowl Classic.

The 1954 Cotton Bowl Classic, part of the 1953 bowl game season, took place on January 1, 1954, at the Cotton Bowl in Dallas, Texas. The competing teams were the Alabama Crimson Tide, representing the Southeastern Conference (SEC) as conference champions, and the Rice Owls, representing the Southwest Conference (SWC) as conference co-champions. Rice won the game 28–6, but its victory was overshadowed by Alabama's Tommy Lewis and his "12th man tackle" of Rice running back Dicky Maegle in the second quarter.

== Teams ==
=== Alabama ===
The 1953 Alabama squad won only six games all year, and only four of seven conference games. However, the other three conference games were ties, and a 4–0–3 record was good enough to win Alabama the SEC title. It was 'Bama's first conference championship since 1945 and last until 1961. Following their victory over Auburn in the Iron Bowl to clinch the conference championship, Alabama accepted an invitation to play in the Cotton Bowl on New Year's Day. The appearance was the second for Alabama in the Cotton Bowl, as they defeated Texas A&M 29–21 in the 1942 game.

=== Rice ===
Rice accepted a bid for the Cotton Bowl following their 41–19 victory over Baylor to clinch a share of the conference championship with Texas. The appearance marked the third for Rice in the Cotton Bowl, as they defeated Colorado 28–14 in the 1938 game and North Carolina 27–13 in the 1950 game.

== Game summary ==
After trading punts on the opening pair of offensive possessions, midway through the first quarter Alabama's Bart Starr intercepted a LeRoy Fenstemaker pass and returned it to the Rice 48-yard line. On the ensuing possession, Alabama scored its only points of the contest after Tommy Lewis capped the drive with a two-yard touchdown run and a 6–0 lead. Rice responded with a trio of long touchdown runs by Dicky Moegle to take a 21–6 lead into the fourth quarter. Moegle's first score came on a 79-yard run on the first play of the second quarter.

Midway through the second, Moegle was awarded a touchdown on one of the more infamous plays in college football history. After taking the handoff from quarterback LeRoy Fenstemaker, Moegle broke free for what was to be a deemed 95-yard touchdown run. In what was dubbed the "12th man tackle," Alabama running back Tommy Lewis left the Alabama bench, entered the field of play and tackled Moegle at the Alabama 42-yard line, apparently believing that even if the 5-yard penalty for illegal participation were enforced, his illegal move would have still stopped the score. However, referee Cliff Shaw instead awarded Moegle a 95-yard touchdown on the play under the palpably unfair act rule, which accounts for situations when a flagrant rule violation prevents a player from scoring by awarding the score anyway. As humorously reported in the Reading Eagle, "The incident became the first in bowl game history where a man on the bench tackled a runner, and also the first where a runner received credit for a touchdown while flat on his back 38 [sic] yards from the goal line."

Moegle's final touchdown came in the third quarter on a 37-yard run to cap a 67-yard drive for the Owls. For the game, Moegle rushed for 265 yards on 11 carries for an average of 24.1 yards per attempt. Rice scored the final points of the game early in the fourth quarter when Buddy Grantham rushed 7-yards for a touchdown to cap a 75-yard drive and bring the final score to 28–6.

Scoring summary

Quarter	Time	Drive			Team	Scoring information	Score	
Quarter	Time	Plays	Yards	TOP	Team	Scoring information	Alabama	Rice
1	3:31		48 yards		Alabama	Tommy Lewis 2-yard touchdown run, Bobby Luna kick failed	6	0
2	14:55		79 yards		Rice	Dicky Moegle 79-yard touchdown run, LeRoy Fenstemaker kick good	6	7
2	8:34		95 yards (Note: As Dicky Moegle passed midfield, running back Tommy Lewis left the Alabama bench, entered the field of play and tackled Moegle at the Alabama 42-yard line. As a result of this action, referee Cliff Shaw awarded Rice a 95-yard touchdown on the play.)		Rice	Dicky Moegle 95-yard touchdown run, LeRoy Fenstemaker kick good	6	14
3	4:56		67 yards		Rice	Dicky Moegle 34-yard touchdown run, LeRoy Fenstemaker kick good	6	21
4	14:25		75 yards		Rice	Buddy Grantham 7-yard touchdown run, LeRoy Fenstemaker kick good	6	28
"TOP" = time of possession. For other American football terms, see Glossary of American football.							6	28

== Aftermath ==
Lewis later explained his tackle by saying that he "was just too full of Alabama." Lewis and Moegle later appeared together on The Ed Sullivan Show.

Rice returned to the Cotton Bowl Classic four years later but did not win a bowl game again until the 2008 Texas Bowl.

Alabama's next Cotton Bowl Classic appearance was 14 years later, its first of four under legendary coach Bear Bryant. The Crimson Tide did not win the Cotton Bowl until January 1981.
