= 1953 Rice Owls football team =

American college football season

1953 Rice Owls football

SWC co-champion Cotton Bowl Classic champion

Cotton Bowl Classic, W 28–6 vs. Alabama
- Conference: Southwest Conference

Ranking
- Coaches: No. 6
- AP: No. 6
- Record: 9–2 (5–1 SWC)
- Head coach: Jess Neely (14th season)
- Home stadium: Rice Stadium

1953 Southwest Conference football standings
	Conf.					Overall
Team	W		L		T	W		L		T
No. 6 Rice +	5	–	1	–	0	9	–	2	–	0
No. 11 Texas +	5	–	1	–	0	7	–	3	–	0
Baylor	4	–	2	–	0	7	–	3	–	0
SMU	3	–	3	–	0	5	–	5	–	0
Arkansas	2	–	4	–	0	3	–	7	–	0
Texas A&M	1	–	5	–	0	4	–	5	–	1
TCU	1	–	5	–	0	3	–	7	–	0
+ – Conference co-champions; Rankings from AP Poll

The 1953 Rice Owls football team represented Rice Institute as a member of the Southwest Conference (SWC) during the 1953 college football season. Led by 14th-year head coach Jess Neely, the Owls compiled an overall record of 9–2 with a mark of 5–1 in conference play, sharing the SWC title with Texas. Rice was ranked No. 6 in the final polls, which were conducted before bowl season. The Owls were invited to the 1954 Cotton Bowl Classic, played on New Year's Day, where they defeated Southeastern Conference (SEC) champion, Alabama. The team played home games at Rice Stadium in Houston.

== Schedule ==
Date	Opponent	Rank	Site	Result	Attendance	Source
September 19	No. 15 Florida*	No. 12	Rice Stadium; Houston, TX	W 20–16	55,000	
October 3	at Cornell*	No. 14	Schoellkopf Field; Ithaca, NY	W 28–7	22,000	
October 10	Hardin–Simmons*	No. 11	Rice Stadium; Houston, TX	W 40–0	25,000	
October 17	at SMU	No. 11	Cotton Bowl; Dallas, TX (rivalry)	L 7–12	50,000	
October 24	at Texas		Memorial Stadium; Austin, TX (rivalry)	W 18–13	48,000	
October 31	No. 19 Kentucky*	No. 12	Rice Stadium; Houston, TX	L 13–19	33,000	
November 7	Arkansas		Rice Stadium; Houston, TX	W 47–0	32,000	
November 14	Texas A&M	No. 16	Rice Stadium; Houston, TX	W 34–7	57,500	
November 21	at TCU	No. 10	Amon G. Carter Stadium; Fort Worth, TX	W 19–6	20,000	
November 28	No. 17 Baylor	No. 8	Rice Stadium; Houston, TX	W 41–19	68,000	
January 1	vs. No. 13 Alabama*	No. 6	Cotton Bowl; Dallas, TX (Cotton Bowl Classic)	W 28–6	75,500	
*Non-conference game; Rankings from AP Poll released prior to the game
