= Dicky Moegle =

American football player (1934–2021)

Dick Moegle
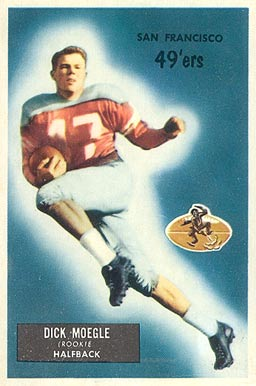
- Moegle on a 1955 Bowman football card

No. 47
- Positions: Safety, halfback, fullback

Personal information
- Born: September 14, 1934; Taylor, Texas, U.S.
- Died: July 4, 2021 (aged 86); Houston, Texas, U.S.
- Listed height: 6 ft 0 in (1.83 m)
- Listed weight: 195 lb (88 kg)

Career information
- High school: Taylor
- College: Rice (1951–1954)
- NFL draft: 1955: 1st round, 10th overall pick

Career history
- San Francisco 49ers (1955–1959); Pittsburgh Steelers (1960); Dallas Cowboys (1961)

Awards and highlights
- Second-team All-Pro (1957); Pro Bowl (1955); Consensus All-American (1954); First-team All-SWC (1954); Second-team All-SWC (1953)

Career NFL statistics
- Rushing yards: 310
- Rushing average: 5.2
- Receptions: 8
- Receiving yards: 185
- Interceptions: 28
- Fumble recoveries: 4
- Total touchdowns: 7
- Stats at Pro Football Reference
- College Football Hall of Fame

Richard Lee Maegle (born Moegle; September 14, 1934 – July 4, 2021) was an American professional football player who was a halfback in the National Football League (NFL) for the San Francisco 49ers, Pittsburgh Steelers, and Dallas Cowboys. He played college football at Rice University, where he was a consensus All-American in 1954.

== Early life ==
Moegle attended Taylor High School, where he played football and basketball. He accepted a football scholarship from Rice University and attended as a 16-year-old freshman. His play was limited in his sophomore season (1952), after he was lost with a hand cut he suffered trying to open a classroom window that was stuck.

In 1953, he teamed up with fullback Dave "Kosse" Johnson (the nation's second leading rusher), to win a share of the Southwest Conference title with the University of Texas, while registering 833 rushing yards with a 7.3-yard average, which led the nation. In the 1954 Cotton Bowl Classic against Alabama, Moegle was involved in one of college football's most famous plays. With Rice leading 7–6, Moegle broke through on a sweep from Rice's five-yard line, and was running down the sideline in front of Alabama's bench on his way to a touchdown. Alabama's Tommy Lewis, without putting on his helmet, jumped off the bench and tackled Moegle. Seeing what happened, referee Cliff Shaw awarded a 95-yard touchdown on the play, and Rice went on to win the game 28–6. Moegle finished with 265 rushing yards, which was a Cotton Bowl Classic record until the 2008 game when Missouri's Tony Temple rushed for 281 yards. He finished with game records of 265 yards on 11 carries for an average of 24.1 yards per attempt and 3 touchdowns. Moegle and Lewis later appeared on The Ed Sullivan Show to talk about the play.

As a senior in 1954, he rushed 905 yards and led the nation in punt returns. He finished his college career after setting 26 school records, including career touchdowns (22), interceptions in a game (3) and total points in a season (72).

In 1979, he was inducted into the College Football Hall of Fame. In 1970, he was inducted into the Rice Athletic Hall of Fame. In 1980, he was inducted into the Texas Sports Hall of Fame.

== Professional career ==
=== San Francisco 49ers ===
Moegle was selected by the San Francisco 49ers in the first round (10th overall) of the 1955 NFL draft. He entered the league as a 20-year-old rookie and was moved between the offense and the defense, but still recorded six interceptions. In 1956, he became the starter at safety, posting six interceptions.

In 1957, he posted eight interceptions. The next year, he played in only four games after injuring his knee against the Philadelphia Eagles. In 1958, he played in eight games.

On March 13, 1960, he was traded to the Pittsburgh Steelers in exchange for a first-round draft choice (#6-Jimmy Johnson).

=== Pittsburgh Steelers ===
In 1960, he was named the starter at safety and registered 6 interceptions. On December 21, he was traded to the Dallas Cowboys in exchange for offensive tackle Dick Klein and safety Bill Butler.

=== Dallas Cowboys ===
After being acquired by the Cowboys in part for being a famous player in the state of Texas, he was named the starter at safety in 1961. At the end of the season, he had surgery on his right foot. On July 30, 1962, he was waived after re-injuring his foot in training camp.

== Personal life ==
During his playing days, his last name was spelled "Moegle"; because it was constantly mispronounced, he changed his name to "Maegle" to be more phonetically correct in 1962. He was a color announcer for the Houston Oilers and a manager of the Tidelands and Tides II hotels.

He died on July 4, 2021, at his home in Houston, Texas.

== See also ==
- List of NCAA major college yearly punt and kickoff return leaders
