= 1953 Baylor Bears football team =

American college football season

1953 Baylor Bears football
- Conference: Southwest Conference
- Record: 7–3 (4–2 SWC)
- Head coach: George Sauer (4th season)
- Captains: Bob Knowles; Ralph "Pete" Erben
- Home stadium: Baylor Stadium

1953 Southwest Conference football standings
	Conf.					Overall
Team	W		L		T	W		L		T
No. 6 Rice +	5	–	1	–	0	9	–	2	–	0
No. 11 Texas +	5	–	1	–	0	7	–	3	–	0
Baylor	4	–	2	–	0	7	–	3	–	0
SMU	3	–	3	–	0	5	–	5	–	0
Arkansas	2	–	4	–	0	3	–	7	–	0
Texas A&M	1	–	5	–	0	4	–	5	–	1
TCU	1	–	5	–	0	3	–	7	–	0
+ – Conference co-champions; Rankings from AP Poll

The 1953 Baylor Bears football team represented Baylor University in the 1953 college football season. They finished with a 7-3 record in the Southwest Conference for the year. Tackle James Ray Smith was selected as an All American player; Cotton Davidson (Quarterback), Jerry Coody (Halfback) and Smith were all selected All-Southwest Conference players.

== Schedule ==
Date	Opponent	Rank	Site	Result	Attendance	Source
September 19	at No. 14 California*	No. 20	California Memorial Stadium; Berkeley, CA	W 25–0	34,000	
October 2	at Miami (FL)*	No. 10	Burdine Stadium; Miami, FL	W 21–13	28,042	
October 10	Arkansas	No. 9	Baylor Stadium; Waco, TX	W 14–7	25,000	
October 17	Vanderbilt*	No. 8	Baylor Stadium; Waco, TX	W 47–6	17,000	
October 24	at No. 15 Texas A&M	No. 6	Kyle Field; College Station, TX (rivalry)	W 14–13	36,000	
October 31	TCU^{†}	No. 3	Baylor Stadium; Waco, TX (rivalry)	W 25–7	30,000	
November 7	at No. 19 Texas	No. 3	Memorial Stadium; Austin, TX (rivalry)	L 20–21	54,000	
November 14	Houston*	No. 9	Baylor Stadium; Waco, TX (rivalry)	L 7–37	15,000	
November 21	SMU		Baylor Stadium; Waco, TX	W 27–21	30,000	
November 28	at No. 8 Rice	No. 17	Rice Stadium; Houston, TX	L 19–41	68,000	
*Non-conference game; ^{†}Homecoming; Rankings from AP Poll released prior to the game
