= 1953 Texas Longhorns football team =

American college football season

1953 Texas Longhorns football

SWC co-champion
- Conference: Southwest Conference

Ranking
- Coaches: No. 8
- AP: No. 11
- Record: 7–3 (5–1 SWC)
- Head coach: Ed Price (3rd season)
- Home stadium: Memorial Stadium

1953 Southwest Conference football standings
	Conf.					Overall
Team	W		L		T	W		L		T
No. 6 Rice +	5	–	1	–	0	9	–	2	–	0
No. 11 Texas +	5	–	1	–	0	7	–	3	–	0
Baylor	4	–	2	–	0	7	–	3	–	0
SMU	3	–	3	–	0	5	–	5	–	0
Arkansas	2	–	4	–	0	3	–	7	–	0
Texas A&M	1	–	5	–	0	4	–	5	–	1
TCU	1	–	5	–	0	3	–	7	–	0
+ – Conference co-champions; Rankings from AP Poll

The 1953 Texas Longhorns football team was an American football team that represented the University of Texas (now known as the University of Texas at Austin) as a member of the Southwest Conference (SWC) during the 1953 college football season. In their third year under head coach Ed Price, the Longhorns compiled an overall record of 7–3, with a mark of 5–1 in conference play, and finished as SWC co-champion.

== Schedule ==
Date	Opponent	Rank	Site	Result	Attendance	Source
September 19	at LSU*	No. 11	Tiger Stadium; Baton Rouge, LA	L 7–20	45,000	
September 26	Villanova*	No. 11	Memorial Stadium; Austin, TX	W 41–12	27,000	
October 3	Houston*	No. 17	Memorial Stadium; Austin, TX	W 28–7	30,000	
October 10	vs. No. 16 Oklahoma*	No. 15	Cotton Bowl; Dallas, TX (rivalry)	L 14–19	75,504	
October 17	at Arkansas		Razorback Stadium; Fayetteville, AR (rivalry)	W 16–7	19,654	
October 24	Rice		Memorial Stadium; Austin, TX (rivalry)	L 13–18	48,000	
October 31	at No. 11 SMU		Cotton Bowl; Dallas, TX	W 16–7	51,000	
November 7	No. 3 Baylor	No. 19	Memorial Stadium; Austin, TX (rivalry)	W 21–20	54,000	
November 14	TCU	No. 10	Memorial Stadium; Austin, TX (rivalry)	W 13–3	42,000	
November 26	at Texas A&M	No. 7	Kyle Field; College Station, TX (rivalry)	W 21–12	42,000	
*Non-conference game; Rankings from AP Poll released prior to the game

== Awards and honors ==
- Carlton Massey, end, Consensus All-American
