= Tommy Lewis (American football) =

American gridiron football player (1931–2014)

Profile
- Position: Fullback

Personal information
- Born: October 7, 1931; Greenville, Alabama, U.S.
- Died: October 12, 2014 (aged 83); Huntsville, Alabama, U.S.
- Listed height: 5 ft 11 in (1.80 m)
- Listed weight: 195 lb (88 kg)

Career information
- High school: Greenville (AL)
- University: Alabama
- NFL draft: 1954: 10th round, 110th overall pick

Career history
- 1956–1957: Ottawa Rough Riders

Thomas Edison Lewis (October 7, 1931 – October 12, 2014) was an American gridiron football player. He played fullback for the Alabama Crimson Tide.

== Playing career ==
Lewis scored two touchdowns in the team's 1953 Orange Bowl victory over Syracuse.

In the first quarter of the 1954 Cotton Bowl Classic against Rice, he scored his team's only touchdown to give the Crimson Tide a 6–0 lead. Lewis is best remembered for his second quarter off-the-bench tackle of Rice's halfback Dicky Moegle on a running play that started at the Rice 5-yard line. Moegle took the handoff and raced along the sideline near the Alabama bench. As Moegle passed midfield, Lewis (wearing jersey number 42) sprang from the bench to tackle Moegle. The referee awarded Rice a 95-yard touchdown on the play. Rice won the game, 28–6. Lewis explained his tackle by saying that he "was just too full of Alabama." Lewis and Moegle later appeared together on The Ed Sullivan Show.

Lewis also played in the Canadian Football League (CFL) with the Ottawa Rough Riders.

== Coaching career ==
In 1962, Lewis became the head coach of the Huntsville Rockets, an expansion club in the minor Dixie Professional Football League.
