= 1954 Bowman Football Card Set =

George Blanda rookie card, a popular card in the set

The 1954 Bowman Football Card Set was a set of football cards released by Bowman Gum in 1954, consisting of 128 cards. They were packaged in two ways: 1-cent wax packs, which had one card inside, and 5-cent packs, which contained 7 cards. Both came with a piece of gum, causing some cards to have permanent stains on them. The two most popular cards of the set were Otto Graham (#40) & the rookie card of George Blanda (#23).

== Printing ==
The cards were printed on four sheets, each consisting of 32 cards. Card numbers 65-96 were short-prints, meaning there weren't as many printed. Because of this, they are more valuable than most other cards in the set. A common issue caused by the printing is the centering of the cards, making it very rare to find a card perfectly centered.

== Appearance ==
The cards measure 2-1/2 by 3-3/4, making them slightly taller than the measurements of current cards, which are 2-1/2 by 3-1/2. The front of the card has a picture of the player on it with a banner that shows the name of the player, the team, & the team's logo. The back of the card is horizontal; the left side has a depiction of a football with the player's name and position inside. The team is on the top right, and the card number is on the top left. Under the ball contains the college the player attended, as well as their residence, age, height, & weight. Below that is a trivia question about the sport. The right of the card contains a short biography of the player. Under the biography, there are the player's statistics from the past season. For linemen & special players, the statistics are instead an explanation of a referee's signal. There are a few cards in the set that have a horizontal front, which is for players who were given awards for their performance or if they were elected to play in a special game such as the Pro Bowl.

== Value ==
Compared to other football card sets from the 1950s, the 1954 set is not as expensive. This is mainly due to the fact that over 250 unopened boxes of 1954 & 1955 football cards were found in Paris, Tennessee, in 1987. Complete sets go anywhere from $2,000 to $10,000.

== Checklist ==
1. Ray Mathews
2. John Huzvar
3. Jack Scarbath
4. Doug Atkins
5. Bill Stits
6. Joe Perry
7. Kyle Rote
8. Norm Van Brocklin
9. Pete Pihos
10. Babe Parilli
11. Zeke Bratkowski
12. Ollie Matson
13. Pat Brady
14. Fred Enke
15. Harry Ulinski
16. Bobby Garrett
17. Bill Bowman
18. Leo Rucka
19. John Cannady
20. Tom Fears
21. Norm Willey
22. Floyd Reid
23. George Blanda
24. Don Dohoney
25. John Schweder
26. Bert Rechichar
27. Harry Dowda
28. John Sandusky
29. Les Bingaman
30. Joe Arenas
31. Ray Wietecha
32. Elroy Hirsch
33. Harold Giancanelli
34. Bill Howton
35. Fred Morrison
36. Bobby Cavazos
37. Darrell Hogan
38. Buddy Young
39. Charlie Justice
40. Otto Graham
41. Doak Walker
42. Y. A. Tittle
43. Buford Long
44. Vonley Quinlan
45. Bobby Thomason
46. Fred Cone
47. Gerald Weatherly
48. Don Stonesifer
49. Lynn Chandnois
50. George Taliaferro
51. Dick Alban
52. Lou Groza
53. Bobby Layne
54. Hugh McElhenny
55. Frank Gifford
56. Leon McLaughlin
57. Chuck Bednarik
58. Art Hunter
59. Bill McColl
60. Charley Trippi
61. Jim Finks
62. Bill Lange
63. Laurie Niemi
64. Ray Renfro
65. Dick Chapman
66. Bob Hantla
67. Ralph Starkey
68. Don Paul
69. Kenneth Snyder
70. Tobin Rote
71. Art DeCarlo
72. Tom Keane
73. Hugh Taylor
74. Warren Lahr
75. Jim Neal
76. Leo Nomellini
77. Dick Yelvington
78. Les Richter
79. Bucko Kilroy
80. John Martinkovic
81. Dale Dodrill
82. Ken Jackson
83. Paul Lipscomb
84. John Bauer
85. Lou Creekmur
86. Eddie Price
87. Ken Farragut
88. Dave Hanner
89. Don Boll
90. Chet Hanulak
91. Thurman McGraw
92. Don Heinrich
93. Dan McKown
94. Bob Fleck
95. Jerry Hilgenberg
96. Bill Walsh
97. Tom Finnan
98. Paul Barry
99. Harry Jagade
100. Jack Christiansen
101. Gordon Saltau
102. Emlen Tunnell
103. Stan West
104. Jerry Williams
105. Veryl Switzer
106. Billy Stone
107. Jerry Watford
108. Elbert Nickel
109. Ed Sharkey
110. Steve Meilinger
111. Dante Lavelli
112. Leon Hart
113. Charlie Conerly
114. Richard Lemmon
115. Al Carmichael
116. George Connor
117. John Olszewski
118. Ernie Stautner
119. Ray Smith
120. Neil Worden
121. Jim Dooley
122. Arnold Galiffa
123. Kline Gilbert
124. Bob Hoernschemeyer
125. Wilford White
126. Art Spinney
127. Joe Koch
128. John Lattner
