= List of Rice Owls in the NFL draft =

This is a list of Rice Owls football players in the NFL draft.

== Key ==
B	Back	K	Kicker	NT	Nose tackle
C	Center	LB	Linebacker	FB	Fullback
DB	Defensive back	P	Punter	HB	Halfback
DE	Defensive end	QB	Quarterback	WR	Wide receiver
DT	Defensive tackle	RB	Running back	G	Guard
E	End	T	Offensive tackle	TE	Tight end

== Selections ==
Year	Round	Pick	Overall	Player	Team	Position
1936	2	1	10	John McCauley	Philadelphia Eagles	B
1936	4	1	28	Bill Wallace	Philadelphia Eagles	B
1936	8	5	68	John Sylvester	Chicago Bears	E
1937	7	8	68	J. W. Friedman	Chicago Bears	B
1939	6	4	44	Carl Schuehle	Philadelphia Eagles	B
1940	1	5	5	Olie Cordill	Cleveland Rams	B
1940	14	8	128	Ernie Lain	Washington Redskins	B
1940	16	3	143	J. R. Green	Philadelphia Eagles	T
1941	8	1	61	Fred Harman	Chicago Bears	T
1941	22	4	199	Ken Whitlow	Brooklyn Dodgers	C
1942	8	2	62	Bob Brumley	Cleveland Rams	B
1943	10	7	87	Dick Dwelle	Pittsburgh Steelers	B
1943	24	4	224	Weldon Humble	Chicago Cardinals	G
1943	28	9	269	Ted Brannon	Chicago Bears	T
1944	5	1	33	Bill Blackburn	Chicago Cardinals	C
1944	26	4	267	Charley Malmberg	Pittsburgh Steelers	T
1944	28	7	292	Lindsey Bowen	Washington Redskins	E
1945	15	6	148	Windell Williams	Detroit Lions	E
1945	18	1	176	Virgil Eikenberg	Brooklyn Dodgers	B
1945	22	9	228	John Magee	Philadelphia Eagles	G
1945	24	3	244	Ed Cain	Pittsburgh Steelers	B
1945	30	11	318	Ham Nichols	Green Bay Packers	G
1946	4	1	26	Hamilton Nichols	Chicago Cardinals	G
1946	6	4	44	Ted Scruggs	Chicago Bears	E
1946	17	8	158	Bill Scrugg	Detroit Lions	B
1947	14	5	120	Carl Russ	Chicago Cardinals	B
1947	25	5	230	Johnny Kelly	Philadelphia Eagles	B
1947	26	7	242	H. J. Roberts	Philadelphia Eagles	G
1948	10	6	81	George Walmsley	Green Bay Packers	B
1948	12	7	102	Bill Wyman	Philadelphia Eagles	T
1948	13	3	108	Carl Russ	Washington Redskins	B
1948	18	2	157	Jim Spruill	Detroit Lions	T
1948	22	6	201	Don Anderson	Green Bay Packers	B
1948	32	2	295	Bill Taylor	Los Angeles Rams	E
1949	4	2	33	Huey Keeney	New York Yanks	B
1949	8	1	72	Gerry Weatherly	Chicago Bears	C
1949	19	4	185	Jack McBride	Pittsburgh Steelers	E
1949	23	3	224	Nick Lanza	New York Yanks	B
1950	1	5	5	Joe Watson	Detroit Lions	C
1950	2	3	17	Tobin Rote	Green Bay Packers	QB
1950	11	13	144	Bobby Lantrip	Philadelphia Eagles	B
1950	17	1	210	Ralph Murphy	Baltimore Colts	G
1950	23	10	297	Jim Williams	San Francisco 49ers	E
1950	24	9	309	Bill Wyman	San Francisco 49ers	T
1951	4	2	40	Paul Giroski	Washington Redskins	T
1951	27	6	321	Bob Winship	Philadelphia Eagles	T
1952	2	2	15	Billy Howton	Green Bay Packers	E
1952	11	3	124	Billy Burkhalter	Green Bay Packers	B
1952	18	10	215	Eugene "Gene" Little	New York Giants	G
1952	29	7	344	Teddy Riggs	Chicago Bears	B
1953	17	9	202	Don Rhoden	New York Giants	C
1953	21	10	251	Bill Crockett	Cleveland Browns	G
1953	25	7	296	Dan Drake	New York Giants	B
1954	1	13	13	Dick Chapman	Detroit Lions	T
1954	2	10	23	Leo Rucka	San Francisco 49ers	C
1954	6	5	66	John Hudson	Chicago Bears	G
1954	11	11	132	Max Schuebel	Cleveland Browns	T
1954	14	2	159	Dave Johnson	Green Bay Packers	B
1954	23	10	275	LeRoy Fenstemaker	San Francisco 49ers	B
1954	28	10	335	Bob Garbrecht	San Francisco 49ers	B
1955	1	10	10	Dicky Moegle	San Francisco 49ers	B
1955	8	12	97	Lamoine Holland	Detroit Lions	E
1956	10	12	121	Eddie Rayburn	Cleveland Browns	T
1956	24	5	282	Orville Trask	Chicago Cardinals	T
1956	24	7	284	Don Wilson	Green Bay Packers	C
1956	25	1	290	Jerry Hall	Detroit Lions	B
1957	8	4	89	Don Gillis	Cleveland Browns	C
1958	1	1	1	King Hill	Chicago Cardinals	QB
1958	5	6	55	Frank Ryan	Los Angeles Rams	QB
1958	15	11	180	Howard Hoelscher	Cleveland Browns	B
1959	2	3	15	J. D. Smith	Philadelphia Eagles	T
1959	2	10	22	Buddy Dial	New York Giants	E
1959	7	10	82	Gene Miller	Cleveland Browns	T
1959	13	9	153	Gene Jones	Chicago Bears	B
1959	27	12	324	Terry Thurman	Baltimore Colts	B
1960	12	11	143	Bill Bucek	Baltimore Colts	HB
1962	3	5	33	John Cornett	Los Angeles Rams	T
1962	7	8	92	John Burrell	San Francisco 49ers	E
1962	16	4	214	Bob Johnston	Dallas Cowboys	T
1964	3	3	31	John Mims	Los Angeles Rams	T
1964	19	2	254	Dick Bowe	Philadelphia Eagles	T
1965	2	5	19	Malcolm Walker	Dallas Cowboys	LB
1965	8	5	103	Russell Wayt	Dallas Cowboys	LB
1966	16	1	231	Jim Vining	Atlanta Falcons	G
1969	15	24	388	Leland Winston	Kansas City Chiefs	T
1970	11	3	263	Brownie Wheless	Miami Dolphins	T
1970	16	4	394	Larry Davis	Buffalo Bills	WR
1971	7	21	177	Brownie Wheless	Detroit Lions	T
1971	11	5	265	Macon Hughes	Houston Oilers	WR
1971	11	9	269	Roger Roitsch	Denver Broncos	DT
1972	8	11	193	Stahle Vincent	Pittsburgh Steelers	RB
1972	14	9	347	Bob Brown	Chicago Bears	WR
1972	17	16	432	Mike Tyler	Detroit Lions	DB
1973	2	1	27	Gary Butler	Kansas City Chiefs	TE
1973	7	20	176	Rodrigo Barnes	Dallas Cowboys	LB
1973	9	1	209	Mark Williams	Houston Oilers	K
1974	7	8	164	Carl Swierc	Miami Dolphins	WR
1974	14	6	344	Ed Collins	Baltimore Colts	WR
1974	14	20	358	Bruce Henley	Pittsburgh Steelers	DB
1974	16	17	407	Preston Anderson	Cleveland Browns	DB
1975	3	7	59	Cornelius Walker	Kansas City Chiefs	DT
1975	10	12	246	Alan Pringle	Houston Oilers	K
1975	14	14	352	Jody Medford	Houston Oilers	G
1976	5	28	152	Rodney Norton	Pittsburgh Steelers	LB
1976	7	24	206	Larry Brune	Minnesota Vikings	DB
1977	1	27	27	Tommy Kramer	Minnesota Vikings	QB
1977	10	22	273	James Sykes	Washington Redskins	RB
1979	9	22	242	Charlie Taylor	Denver Broncos	WR
1980	1	13	13	Earl Cooper	San Francisco 49ers	RB
1981	8	16	209	Frank Wilson	Pittsburgh Steelers	RB
1981	9	10	231	Darryl Grant	Washington Redskins	G
1981	9	24	245	Calvin Fance	Atlanta Falcons	RB
1982	8	18	213	Robert Hubble	New York Giants	TE
1983	11	12	291	Clenzie Pierson	New York Giants	DT
1986	10	18	267	Elliston Stinson	San Francisco 49ers	WR
1989	2	9	37	Courtney Hall	San Diego Chargers	C
1991	4	16	99	Donald Hollas	Cincinnati Bengals	QB
1992	10	28	280	Tony Barker	Washington Redskins	LB
1994	2	16	45	Bert Emanuel	Atlanta Falcons	WR
1997	5	22	152	Ndukwe Kalu	Philadelphia Eagles	DE
2003	5	7	142	Ryan Pontbriand	Cleveland Browns	C
2003	6	3	176	Brandon Green	Jacksonville Jaguars	DE
2009	5	8	144	Jarett Dillard	Jacksonville Jaguars	WR
2009	5	16	152	James Casey	Houston Texans	TE
2011	7	51	254	Cheta Ozougwu	Houston Texans	DE
2012	7	4	211	Scott Solomon	Tennessee Titans	DE
2013	2	23	55	Vance McDonald	San Francisco 49ers	TE
2013	5	25	158	Luke Willson	Seattle Seahawks	TE
2014	3	23	87	Phillip Gaines	Kansas City Chiefs	DB
2015	6	40	216	Christian Covington	Houston Texans	DT
2024	3	36	100	Luke McCaffrey	Washington Commanders	WR

== Notable undrafted players ==
Note: No drafts held before 1920

Year	Player	Position	Debut Team	Notes
1967	Chuck Latourette	P	St. Louis Cardinals	—
1968	Hugo Hollas	S	Dallas Cowboys	—
1979	Douglas Cunningham	WR	Minnesota Vikings	—
1981	Michael Downs	S	Dallas Cowboys	—
1982	Hosea Fortune	WR	Dallas Cowboys	—
1983	Vince Courville	WR	Los Angeles Raiders	—
1986	James Hamrick	K	San Diego Chargers	—
1987	Dale Walters	P	Cleveland Browns	—
1993	Trevor Cobb	RB	Kansas City Chiefs	—
1996	O. J. Brigance	LB	Miami Dolphins	—
1996	Larry Izzo	LB	Miami Dolphins	—
1997	Spencer George	RB	Tennessee Oilers	—
1999	LaDouphyous McCalla	DB	Dallas Cowboys	—
2005	Jeremy Callahan	DT	St. Louis Rams	—
2005	Patrick Dendy	CB	Green Bay Packers	—
2006	John Syptak	DL	Seattle Seahawks	—
2007	Quinton Smith	RB	New England Patriots	—
2010	Andrew Sendejo	S	Dallas Cowboys	—
2013	Sam McGuffie	WR	Oakland Raiders	—
2014	Chris Boswell	K	Houston Texans	—
2015	Bryce Callahan	CB	Chicago Bears	—
2015	Jordan Taylor	WR	Denver Broncos	—
2018	Emmanuel Ellerbee	LB	Atlanta Falcons	—
2019	Jack Fox	P	Kansas City Chiefs	—
2019	Austin Walter	RB	San Francisco 49ers	—
2020	Myles Adams	DE	Carolina Panthers	—
2020	Nick Leverett	C	Tampa Bay Buccaneers	—
2021	Austin Trammell	WR	Atlanta Falcons	—
2022	Elijah Garcia	DE	Los Angeles Rams	—
2025	Brant Banks	T	Green Bay Packers	—

== See also ==
- List of Rice University people
