= 1948 All-Southwest Conference football team =

American college football all-star team

The 1948 All-Southwest Conference football team consists of American football players chosen by various organizations for All-Southwest Conference teams for the 1948 college football season. The selectors for the 1948 season included the Associated Press (AP) and the United Press (UP). Players selected as first-team players by both the AP and UP are designated in bold.

== All Southwest selections ==
=== Backs ===
- **Doak Walker**, SMU (AP-1; UP-1) (1948 Heisman Trophy; College and Pro Football Halls of Fame)
- **Clyde Scott**, Arkansas (AP-1; UP-1)
- **Lindy Berry**, TCU (AP-1; UP-1)
- Dick McKissack, SMU (AP-1)
- Ray Borneman, Texas (UP-1)

=== Ends ===
- **James Williams**, Rice (AP-1; UP-1)
- **Morris Bailey**, TCU (AP-1; UP-1)

=== Tackles ===
- **George Petrovich**, Texas (AP-1; UP-1)
- **R. P. Tinsley**, Baylor (AP-1; UP-1)
- Jim Winkler, Texas (AP-1)

=== Guards ===
- Joe Watson, Rice (AP-1)
- Bentley Jones, Baylor (UP-1)
- Odell Stautzenberger, Texas A&M (UP-1)

=== Centers ===
- **Dick Harris**, Texas (AP-1; UP-1)

== Key ==
AP = Associated Press

UP = United Press

Bold = Consensus first-team selection of both the AP and UP

== See also ==
- 1948 College Football All-America Team
