= List of Chicago Bears first-round draft picks =

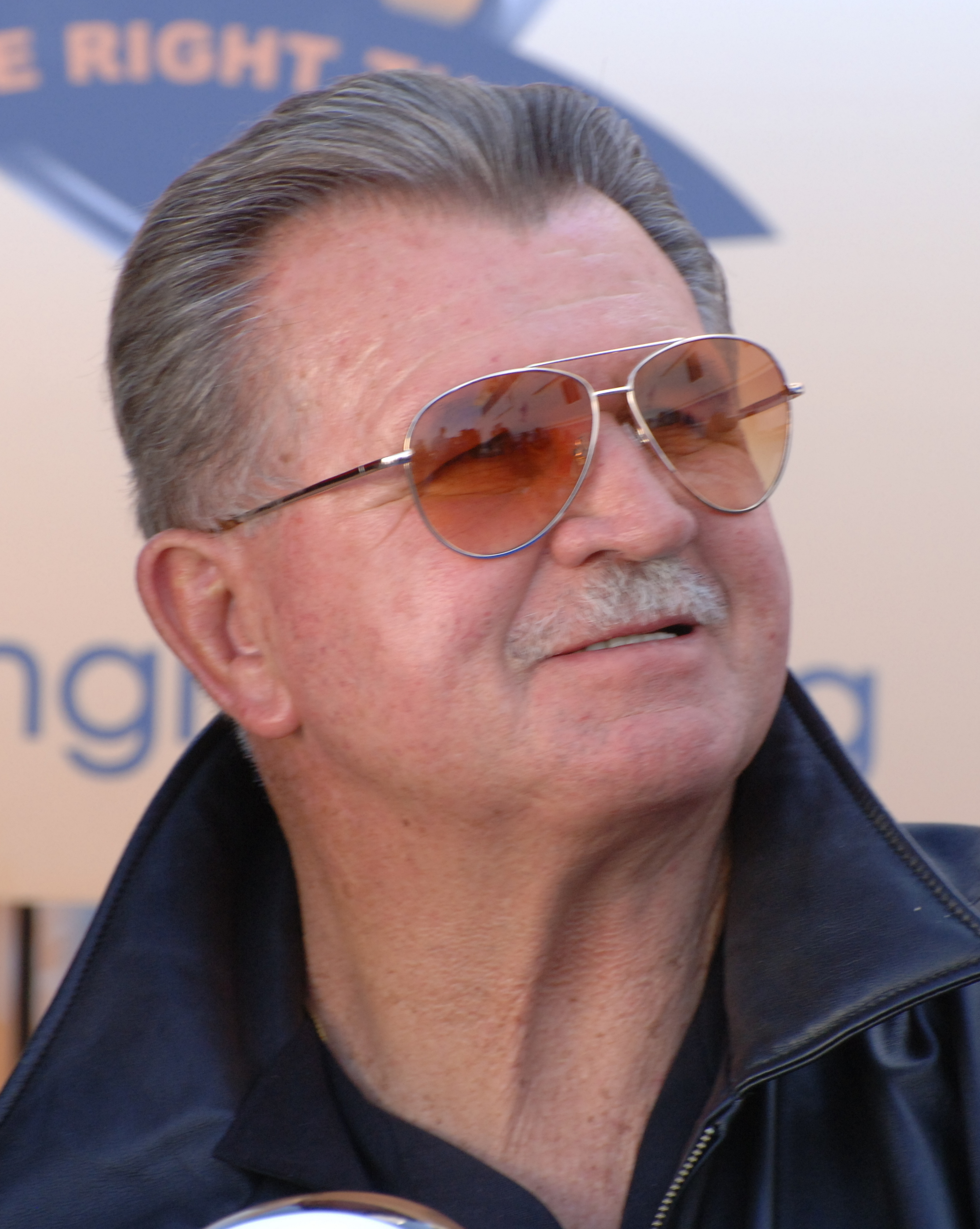
Mike Ditka was the Bears' first-round selection in the 1961 NFL draft. Ditka would later become the team's head coach for 11 seasons, during which time they won Super Bowl XX. In 1988, he was inducted into the Pro Football Hall of Fame for his accomplishments as a player.

The Chicago Bears are an American football franchise based in Chicago, Illinois. The Bears compete in the National Football League (NFL) as a member of the National Football Conference North Division. The franchise was founded in Decatur, Illinois, on September 20, 1919, became professional on September 17, 1920, and moved to Chicago in 1921. It is one of only two remaining franchises from the NFL's founding in 1920, along with the Arizona Cardinals, which was originally also in Chicago. The team played home games at Wrigley Field on Chicago's North Side through the 1970 season; they now play at Soldier Field on the South Side adjacent to Lake Michigan.

The NFL draft, officially known as the "NFL Annual Player Selection Meeting", is an annual event which serves as the league's most common source of player recruitment. The draft order is determined based on the previous season's standings; the teams with the worst win–loss records receive the earliest picks. Teams that qualified for the NFL playoffs select after non-qualifiers, and their order depends on how far they advanced, using their regular season record as a tie-breaker. The final two selections in the first round are reserved for the Super Bowl runner-up and champion. Draft picks are tradable and players or other picks can be acquired with them.

In 1936, the league introduced the NFL draft after team owners voted on it in 1935. The intention of the draft is to make the NFL more competitive, as some teams had an advantage in signing players. From 1947 through 1958 the NFL designated the first overall selection as a "bonus" or "lottery pick". The pick was awarded by a random draw and the winner who received the "bonus pick" forfeited its selection in the final round of the draft and became ineligible for future draws. The system was abolished prior to the 1959 NFL draft, as all twelve teams in the league at the time had received a bonus choice.

Since the first draft, the Bears have selected 99 players in the first round. The team's first-round pick in the inaugural NFL draft was Joe Stydahar, a tackle from West Virginia University; he was the sixth overall selection. The Bears have held the first overall pick three times and selected Tom Harmon in 1941, Bob Fenimore in 1947, and Caleb Williams in 2024. In the most recent draft, held in 2026, the Bears selected Oregon safety Dillon Thieneman.

The Bears did not draft a player in the first round on nine occasions, most recently in 2022. Eleven of the team's first-round picks—Dick Butkus, Jim Covert, Mike Ditka, Dan Hampton, Chuck Howley, Sid Luckman, Walter Payton, Gale Sayers, Joe Stydahar, Clyde Turner, and Brian Urlacher—have been inducted into the Pro Football Hall of Fame. Three of the team's first-round picks—Dave Behrman, Steve DeLong, and George Rice—chose to sign with the NFL's pre-merger direct competitor, the American Football League (AFL), instead.

== Player selections ==
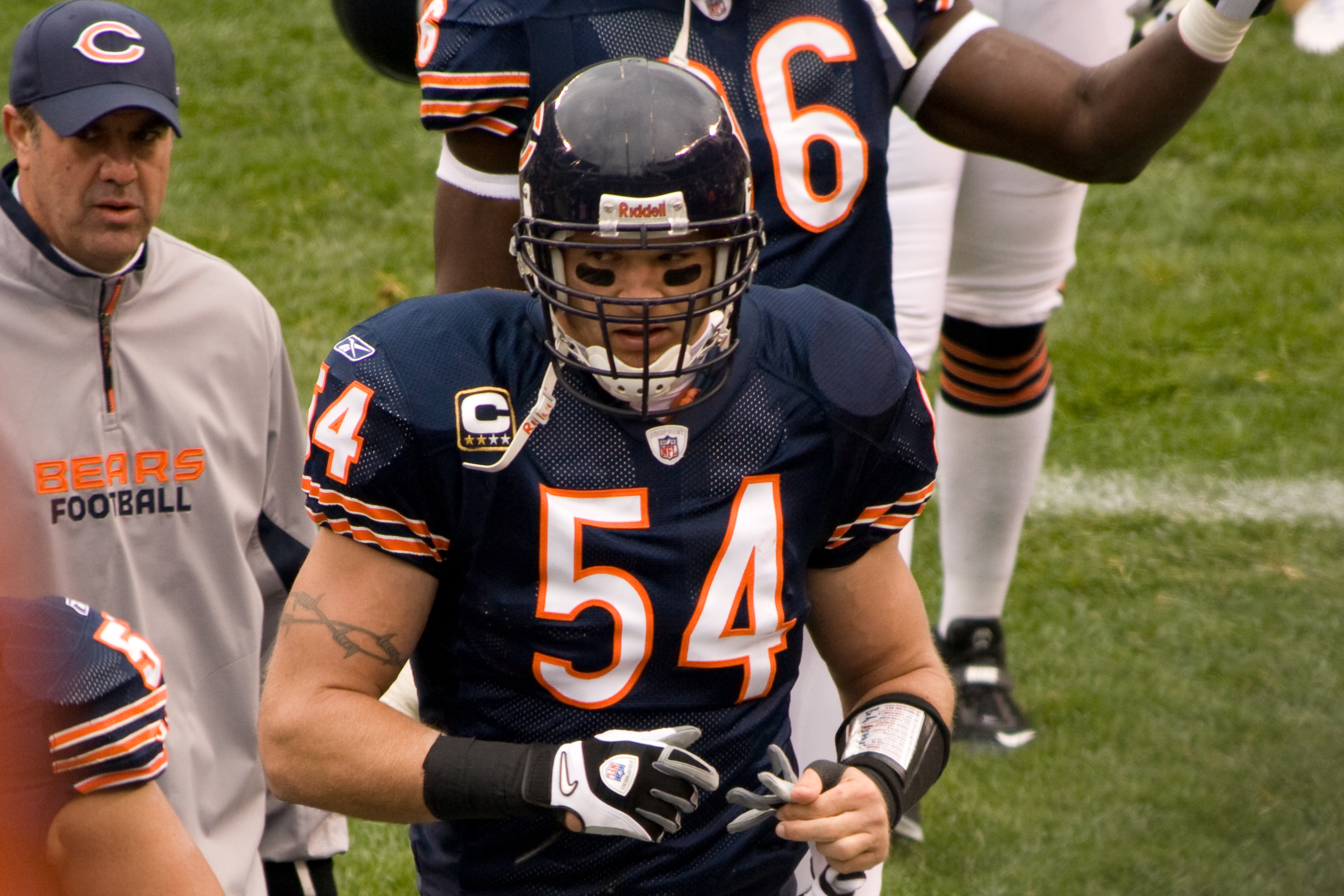
Hall of Fame linebacker Brian Urlacher was drafted by the Bears with the 9th overall pick in the 2000 NFL draft. He spent his whole career with the Bears (2000–2012), during which time he won NFL Defensive Player of the Year (2005), made the NFL 2000s All-Decade Team, and was selected to eight Pro Bowls.

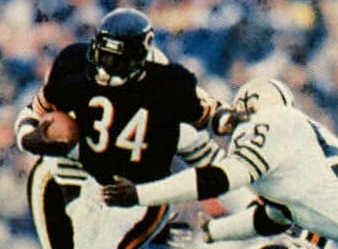
Running back Walter Payton was drafted by the Bears in 1975 and inducted into the Pro Football Hall of Fame in 1993. He won the NFL MVP award in 1977 and was unanimously selected for the NFL 100th Anniversary All-Time Team.

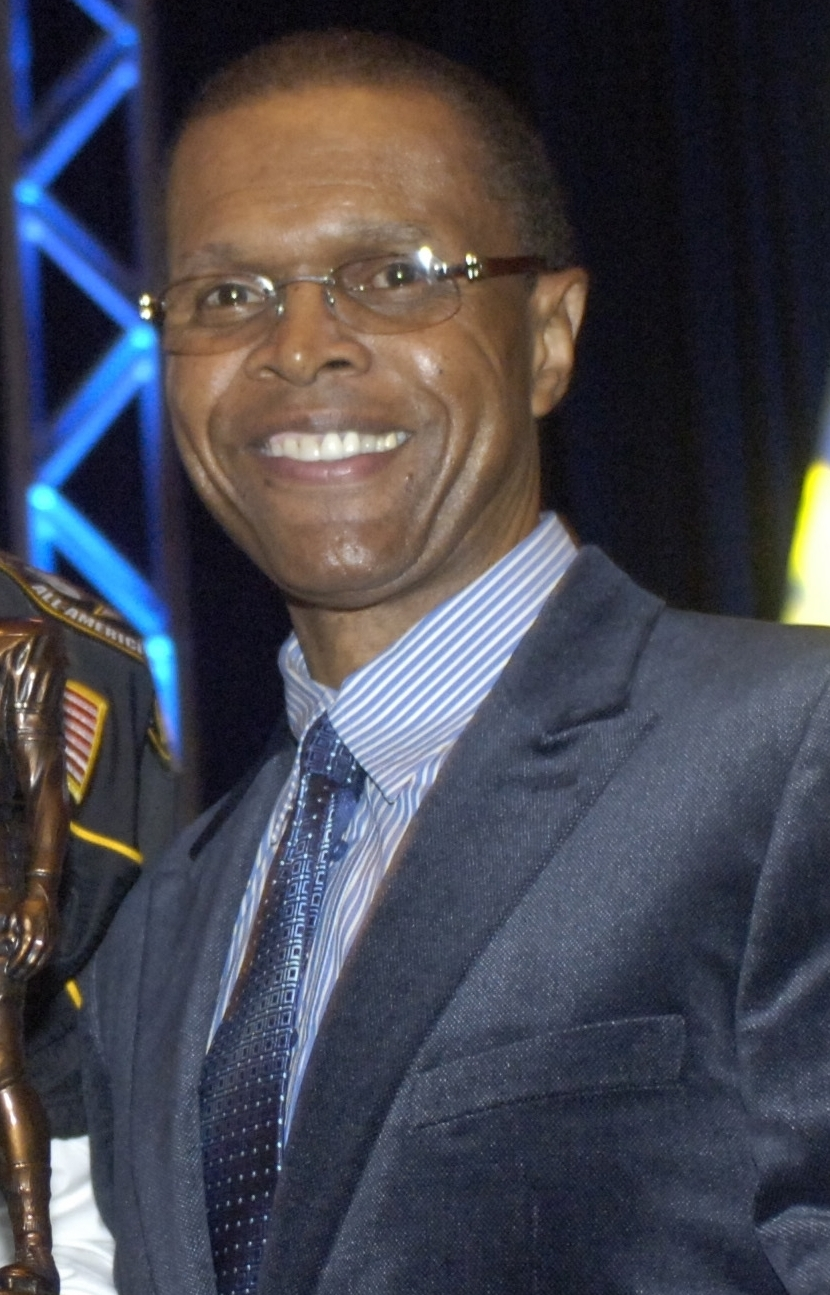
Gale Sayers, a running back drafted in 1965, spent his entire 7 season career with the Bears before being inducted into the Pro Football Hall of Fame in 1977. Sayers was a five-time All-Pro and was selected for the NFL 100th Anniversary All-Time Team.

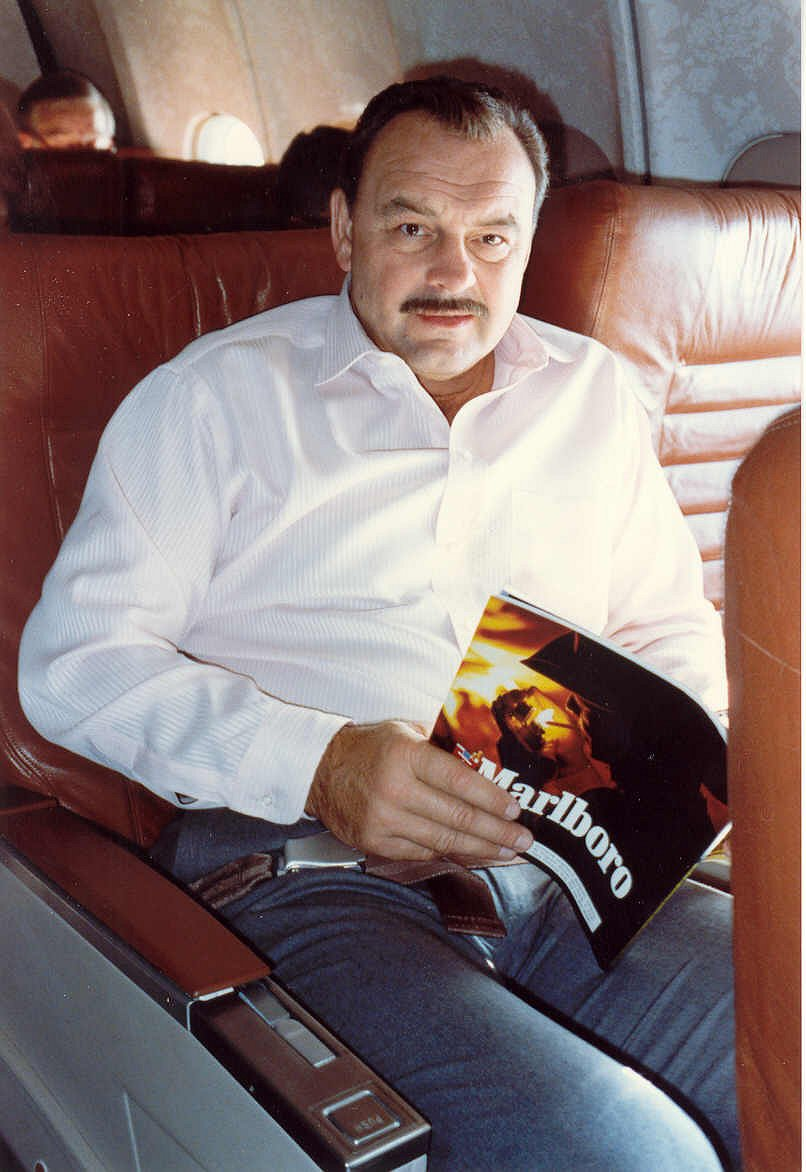
Dick Butkus was a linebacker drafted by the Bears in the 1965 NFL draft. During his 9-year career with the Bears, he was the Defensive Player of the Year twice, made eight Pro Bowls, and was selected as an All-Pro eight times. He was also unanimously selected for the NFL 100th Anniversary All-Time Team.

Key
Symbol	Meaning
†	Inducted into the Pro Football Hall of Fame
*	Selected number one overall

Position abbreviations
C	Center
CB	Cornerback
DB	Defensive back
DE	Defensive end
DT	Defensive tackle
E	End
FB	Fullback
G	Guard
HB	Halfback
LB	Linebacker
QB	Quarterback
RB	Running back
S	Safety
T	Tackle
TE	Tight end
WR	Wide receiver

Chicago Bears first-round draft picks by season
Season	Pick	Player	Position	College	Notes
1936	6	Joe Stydahar†	T	West Virginia	
1937	6	Les McDonald	E	Nebraska	
1938	10	Joe Gray	HB	Oregon State	
1939	2	Sid Luckman†	QB	Columbia	Pick received from Pittsburgh Pirates (Note: Chicago traded end Ed Manske to the Pittsburgh Pirates in exchange for their 1939 first-round selection (No. 2 overall).)
1939	6	Bill Osmanski	FB	Holy Cross	
1940	7	Clyde Turner†	C	Hardin-Simmons	
1941	1	Tom Harmon*	HB	Michigan	Pick received from Philadelphia Eagles. (Note: Chicago traded guard Dick Bassi and end Les McDonald to the Philadelphia Eagles in exchange for center John Schiechl. As a result of Schiechl failing to report, Chicago received Philadelphia's 1941 first-round selection (No. 1 overall).) Did not sign with team. (Note: Tom Harmon signed with the New York Americans of the American Football League, who he played a single game for prior to enlisting in the Army Air Corps. In 1946, Chicago traded the rights to Harmon to the Los Angeles Rams in exchange for halfback Dante Magnani and tackle Fred Davis.)
1941	3	Norm Standlee	FB	Stanford	Pick received from Pittsburgh Steelers (Note: Chicago traded back Billy Patterson to the Pittsburgh Steelers in exchange for their 1941 first-round selection (No. 3 overall).)
1941	9	Don Scott	HB	Ohio State	
1942	10	Frankie Albert	QB	Stanford	
1943	9	Bob Steuber	HB	Missouri	
1944	9	Ray Evans	HB	Kansas	
1945	11	Don Lund	HB	Michigan	Chose to play Major League Baseball instead
1946	4	Johnny Lujack	QB	Notre Dame	
1947	1	Bob Fenimore*	HB	Oklahoma A&M	Lottery bonus pick
1947	11	Dick Kindt	HB	Wisconsin	
1948	10	Max Bumgardner	DE	Texas	
1949	11	Dick Harris	C	Texas	
1950	3	Chuck Hunsinger	HB	Florida	Pick received from New York Bulldogs (Note: Chicago traded quarterback Bobby Layne to the New York Bulldogs (who became the New York Yanks) in exchange for their 1950 first-round selection (No. 3 overall), 1951 first-round selection (No. 10 overall), and cash.)
1950	10	Fred Morrison	HB	Ohio State	
1951	2	Bob Williams	QB	Notre Dame	Pick received from Baltimore Colts (Note: Chicago traded two-way player Jim Spavital to the Baltimore Colts in exchange for their 1951 first-round selection (No. 2 overall).)
1951	10	Billy Stone	HB	Bradley	Pick received from New York Yanks
1951	12	Gene Schroeder	WR	Virginia	
1952	8	Jim Dooley	HB	Miami	
1953	6	Billy Anderson	HB	Compton JC	
1954	6	Stan Wallace	HB	Illinois	
1955	11	Ron Drzewiecki	HB	Marquette	
1956	10	Menan Schriewer	E	Texas	Did not play for the team (Note: Menan Schriewer chose to sign with Toronto Argonauts of the Canadian Football League instead.)
1957	13	Earl Leggett	DT	LSU	
1958	7	Chuck Howley†	LB	West Virginia	
1959	7	Don Clark	HB	Ohio State	
1960	7	Roger Davis	G	Syracuse	
1961	5	Mike Ditka†	TE	Pittsburgh	
1962	7	Ronnie Bull	RB	Baylor	
1963	11	Dave Behrman	C	Michigan State	Original pick traded to Los Angeles Rams. (Note: Chicago traded their 1963 first-round selection (No. 10 overall) to the Los Angeles Rams in exchange for fullback Joe Marconi.) Pick received from Pittsburgh Steelers. (Note: Chicago traded quarterback Ed Brown to the Pittsburgh Steelers in exchange for their 1963 first-round selection (No. 11 overall) and 1964 second-round selection (No. 23 overall).) Signed for the AFL's Buffalo Bills instead.
1964	14	Dick Evey	DT	Tennessee	
1965	3	Dick Butkus†	LB	Illinois	Pick received from Pittsburgh Steelers (Note: Chicago traded their 1964 second- and fourth-round selections (Nos. 28 and 51 overall) to the Pittsburgh Steelers in exchange for their 1965 first-round selection (No. 3 overall).)
1965	4	Gale Sayers†	HB	Kansas	
1965	6	Steve DeLong	DE	Tennessee	Pick received from Washington Redskins. (Note: Chicago traded end Angelo Coia and defensive tackle Fred Williams to the Washington Redskins in exchange for their 1965 first-round selection (No. 6 overall).) Signed for the AFL's San Diego Chargers instead.
1966	12	George Rice	DT	LSU	Signed for the AFL's Houston Oilers instead
1967	10	Loyd Phillips	DE	Arkansas	
1968	16	Mike Hull	FB	USC	
1969	14	Rufus Mayes	T	Ohio State	Moved down draft order due to failure to pick within allotted time (Note: Chicago did not submit their first-round selection within the allotted 15 minute time frame. This allowed the New York Giants (previously pick No. 14 overall) the opportunity to select ahead of Chicago (previously pick No. 13 overall).)
1970	No pick				Pick traded to Green Bay Packers (Note: Chicago traded their 1970 first-round selection (No. 2 overall) to the Green Bay Packers in exchange for guard Bob Hyland, halfback Elijah Pitts, and linebacker Lee Roy Caffey.)
1971	11	Joe Moore	RB	Missouri	
1972	3	Lionel Antoine	T	Southern Illinois	Pick received from New York Giants (Note: Chicago traded guard Bob Hyland and cornerback Bennie McRae to the New York Giants in exchange for their 1972 first-round selection (No. 3 overall).)
1972	12	Craig Clemons	S	Iowa	
1973	8	Wally Chambers	DT	Eastern Kentucky	Additional pick received from Kansas City Chiefs, (Note: Chicago traded the rights to George Seals to the Kansas City Chiefs in exchange for their 1973 first-round selection (No. 17 overall).) used to move down draft order in with trade with Detroit Lions, (Note: Chicago traded a 1973 first- (received from the Kansas City Chiefs) and third-round selection (Nos. 17 and 58 overall) to the Detroit Lions in exchange for their 1973 first-round selection (No. 17 overall) and tight end Craig Cotton.) and traded to New England Patriots. (Note: Chicago traded a 1973 first-round selection (No. 19 overall, received from the Detroit Lions) to the New England Patriots in exchange for running back Carl Garrett.)
1974	4	Waymond Bryant	LB	Tennessee State	
1974	20	Dave Gallagher	DE	Michigan	Pick received from Washington Redskins (Note: Chicago received a 1974 first-round selection (No. 20 overall) from the Los Angeles Rams as compensation for free agent wide receiver Dick Gordon.)
1975	4	Walter Payton†	HB	Jackson State	
1976	8	Dennis Lick	T	Wisconsin	Moved up draft order in trade with Detroit Lions (Note: Chicago traded their 1976 first- and third-round selections (Nos. 10 and 68 overall) to the Detroit Lions in exchange for their first-round selection (No. 8 overall).)
1977	15	Ted Albrecht	T	California	
1978	No pick				Pick traded to Cleveland Browns (Note: Chicago traded their 1977 fourth-round selection (No. 110 overall) and 1978 first-round selection (No. 20 overall) to the Cleveland Browns in exchange for quarterback Mike Phipps.)
1979	4	Dan Hampton†	DT	Arkansas	Pick received from Tampa Bay Buccaneers (Note: Chicago traded defensive tackle Wally Chambers to the Tampa Bay Buccaneers in exchange for their 1979 first-round selection (No. 4 overall) and tight end Bob Moore.)
1979	9	Al Harris	DE	Arizona State	
1980	19	Otis Wilson	LB	Louisville	
1981	11	Keith Van Horne	T	USC	
1982	5	Jim McMahon	QB	BYU	
1983	6	Jim Covert†	T	Pittsburgh	
1983	18	Willie Gault	WR	Tennessee	Pick received from Tampa Bay Buccaneers (Note: Chicago traded their 1982 second-round selection (No. 32 overall) to the Tampa Bay Buccaneers in exchange for their 1983 first-round selection (No. 18 overall).)
1984	11	Wilber Marshall	LB	Florida	
1985	22	William Perry	DT	Clemson	
1986	27	Neal Anderson	RB	Florida	
1987	26	Jim Harbaugh	QB	Michigan	
1988	23	Brad Muster	FB	Stanford	
1988	27	Wendell Davis	WR	LSU	Pick received from Washington Redskins (Note: Chicago received a 1988 first-round selection (No. 27 overall) and 1989 first-round selection (No. 12 overall) from the Washington Redskins as compensation for free agent linebacker Wilber Marshall.)
1989	11	Donnell Woolford	CB	Clemson	Original pick traded to Miami Dolphins. (Note: Chicago traded their 1989 first-round selection (No. 25 overall) to the Miami Dolphins in exchange for their 1989 second- and third-round selections (Nos. 36 and 65 overall).) Pick received from Oakland Raiders. (Note: Chicago traded wide receiver Willie Gault to the Oakland Raiders in exchange for their 1989 first-round selection (No. 11 overall) and 1990 third-round selection (No. 63 overall).)
1989	12	Trace Armstrong	DE	Florida	Pick received from Washington Redskins
1990	6	Mark Carrier	S	USC	
1991	22	Stan Thomas	T	Texas	
1992	22	Alonzo Spellman	DE	Ohio State	
1993	7	Curtis Conway	WR	USC	
1994	11	John Thierry	DE	Alcorn State	
1995	21	Rashaan Salaam	RB	Colorado	
1996	13	Walt Harris	CB	Mississippi State	Moved up draft order in trade with St. Louis Rams (Note: Chicago traded their 1996 first-, third, and sixth-round selections (Nos. 18, 83, and 201 overall) to the St. Louis Rams in exchange for their 1996 first-round selection (No. 13 overall).)
1997	No pick				Pick traded to Seattle Seahawks (Note: Chicago traded their 1997 first-round selection (No. 11 overall) to the Seattle Seahawks in exchange for quarterback Rick Mirer.)
1998	5	Curtis Enis	RB	Penn State	
1999	12	Cade McNown	QB	UCLA	Moved down draft order in trade with Washington Redskins (Note: Chicago traded their 1999 first-round selection (No. 7 overall) to the Washington Redskins in exchange for their 1999 first-, third-, fourth-, and fifth-round selections (Nos. 12, 71, 106, and 144 overall) and 2000 third-round selection (No. 87 overall).)
2000	9	Brian Urlacher†	LB	New Mexico	
2001	8	David Terrell	WR	Michigan	
2002	29	Marc Colombo	T	Boston College	
2003	14	Michael Haynes	DE	Penn State	Moved down draft order in trades with New York Jets (Note: Chicago traded their 2003 first-round selection (No. 4 overall) to the New York Jets in exchange for their 2003 fourth- and two first-round selections (Nos. 13, 22, and 116 overall).) and New England Patriots (Note: Chicago traded a 2003 first-round selection (No. 13 overall, received from New York Jets) to the New England Patriots in exchange for their 2003 first- and sixth-round selections (Nos. 14 and 193 overall).)
2003	22	Rex Grossman	QB	Florida	Pick received from New York Jets
2004	14	Tommie Harris	DT	Oklahoma	
2005	4	Cedric Benson	RB	Texas	
2006	No pick				Moved down draft order in trade with Buffalo Bills (Note: Chicago traded their 2006 first-round selection (No. 26 overall) to the Buffalo Bills in exchange for their 2006 second- and third-round selections (Nos. 42 and 73 overall).)
2007	31	Greg Olsen	TE	Miami	
2008	14	Chris Williams	T	Vanderbilt	
2009	No pick				Pick traded to Denver Broncos (Note: Chicago traded their 2009 first- and third-round selections (Nos. 18 and 84 overall), 2010 first-round selection (No. 11 overall), and quarterback Kyle Orton to the Denver Broncos in exchange for their 2009 fifth-round selection (No. 140 overall) and quarterback Jay Cutler.)
2010	No pick				Pick traded to Denver Broncos
2011	29	Gabe Carimi	T	Wisconsin	
2012	19	Shea McClellin	DE	Boise State	
2013	20	Kyle Long	T	Oregon	
2014	14	Kyle Fuller	CB	Virginia Tech	
2015	7	Kevin White	WR	West Virginia	
2016	9	Leonard Floyd	LB	Georgia	Moved up draft order in trade with Tampa Bay Buccaneers (Note: Chicago traded their 2016 first- and fourth-round selections (Nos. 11 and 106 overall) to the Tampa Bay Buccaneers in exchange for their 2016 first-round selection (No. 9 overall).)
2017	2	Mitchell Trubisky	QB	North Carolina	Moved up draft order in trade with San Francisco 49ers (Note: Chicago traded their 2017 first-, third-, and fourth-round selections (Nos. 3, 67, and 111 overall) and 2018 third-round selection (No. 78 overall) to the San Francisco 49ers in exchange for their 2017 first-round selection (No. 2 overall).)
2018	8	Roquan Smith	LB	Georgia	
2019	No pick				Pick traded to Oakland Raiders (Note: Chicago traded their 2019 first- and sixth-round selections (Nos. 24 and 196 overall) and 2020 first- and third-round selections (Nos. 19 and 81 overall) to the Oakland Raiders in exchange for their 2020 second- and seventh-round selections (Nos. 43 and 226 overall) and linebacker Khalil Mack.)
2020	No pick				Pick traded to Las Vegas Raiders
2021	11	Justin Fields	QB	Ohio State	Moved up draft order in trade with New York Giants (Note: Chicago traded their 2021 first- and fifth-round selections (Nos. 20 and 164 overall) and 2022 first- and fourth-round selections (Nos. 7 and 112 overall) to the New York Giants in exchange for their 2021 first-round selection (No. 11 overall).)
2022	No pick				Pick traded to New York Giants
2023	10	Darnell Wright	T	Tennessee	Moved down draft order in trades with Carolina Panthers (Note: Chicago traded their 2023 first-round selection (No. 1 overall) to the Carolina Panthers in exchange for their 2023 first- and second-round selections (Nos. 9 and 61 overall), 2024 first-round selection (No. 1 overall), 2025 second-round selection (No. 39 overall), and wide receiver D. J. Moore.) and Philadelphia Eagles (Note: Chicago traded a 2023 first-round selection (No. 9 overall, received from Carolina Panthers) to the Philadelphia Eagles in exchange for their 2023 first-round selection (No. 10 overall) and 2024 fourth-round selection (No. 122 overall).)
2024	1	Caleb Williams	QB	USC	Pick received from Carolina Panthers
2024	9	Rome Odunze	WR	Washington	
2025	10	Colston Loveland	TE	Michigan	
2026	25	Dillon Thieneman	S	Oregon	

== See also ==
- History of the Chicago Bears
- List of Chicago Bears seasons
- Lists of Chicago Bears players
