= 1949 All-Eastern football team =

American all-star college football team

The 1949 All-Eastern football team consists of American football players chosen by various selectors as the best players at each position among the Eastern colleges and universities during the 1949 college football season.

== All-Eastern selections ==
=== Quarterback ===
- Arnold Galiffa, Army (AP-1; UP-1)
- John Clayton, Dartmouth (AP-2; UP-2)

=== Halfbacks ===
- George Sella, Princeton (AP-1; UP-1)
- Hillary Chollet, Cornell (AP-1; UP-1)
- Louis Cecconi, Pittsburgh (AP-2; UP-2)
- Jeff Fleischmann, Cornell (AP-2)
- Jim Cain, Army (UP-2)

=== Fullback ===
- Bob Zastrow, Navy (AP-1)
- Gil Stephenson, Army (UP-1)
- Ralph Pasquariello, Villanova (AP-2; UP-2)

=== Ends ===
- Dan Foldberg, Army (AP-1; UP-1)
- Tom Rowe, Dartmouth (AP-1; UP-1)
- Henry Wettlaufer, Penn (AP-2)
- Dave Beeman, Dartmouth (AP-2)
- Phil Ryan, Navy (UP-2)

=== Tackles ===
- Holland Donan, Princeton (AP-1; UP-1)
- Richard Clark, Cornell (AP-1)
- Bruce Ackerson, Army (UP-1)
- Ernie Stautner, Boston College (AP-2)
- Bucky Walters, Brown (AP-2)

=== Guards ===
- John Schweder, Penn (AP-1; UP-1)
- Bernie Barkouskie, Pitt (AP-1; UP-1)
- Bob Jablonski, Yale (AP-2)
- Tom Mareski, Fordham (AP-2)

=== Centers ===
- Bob Numbers, Lehigh (AP-1)
- Paul Staley, Dartmouth (UP-1)
- John Pierik, Cornell (AP-2)
- Mitch Smiarowski, St. Bonaventure (UP-2)

== Key ==
- AP = Associated Press
- UP = United Press

== See also ==
- 1949 College Football All-America Team
