= List of Texas Longhorns football All-Americans =

This is a list of college football All-Americans who have played at the University of Texas at Austin.

== Key ==
* Denotes Consensus All-America Selection
‡ Denotes Unanimous All-America Selection

== All-Americans ==
Player	Position	Year(s)
Ben Adams	OG	1998
Marty Akins	QB	1975
Will Allen	OG	2005
Scott Appleton	DT	1963*‡
Bill Atessis	DE	1969, 1970*
Rod Babers	CB	2002
Hub Bechtol	E	1944, 1945*, 1946*
Cedric Benson	RB	2004
Justin Blalock	OT	2005, 2006*‡
Tony Brackens	DE	1995*
Blake Brockermeyer	OT	1994
Malcom Brown	DT	2014
Max Bumgardner	E	1947
Mossy Cade	DB	1983
Earl Campbell	RB	1975, 1977*‡
Kwame Cavil	WR	1999
Gene Chilton	C	1985
Randall Clay	B	1949
Raymond Clayborn	DB	1976
Tim Crowder	DE	2006
Chal Daniel	G	1941
Leonard Davis	OT	2000*
Doug Dawson	OG	1983*
Phil Dawson	PK	1996
Tony Degrate	DT	1984*
Michael Dickson	P	2016, 2017*
Bobby Dillon	RB	1951
Derrick Dockery	OL	2002*
Maurice Doke	OG	1959
Shane Dronett	DE	1991
DeShon Elliott	DB	2017*‡
Doug English	DT	1974
Russell Erxleben	PK	1976, 1977, 1978
Happy Feller	PK	1970
Anthony Fera	PK	2013*
Pat Fitzgerald	TE	1995, 1996
Tommy Ford	RB	1963
Chris Gilbert	RB	1968*
Herb Gray	OT	1955
Jerry Gray	DB	1983*, 1984*‡
Michael Griffin	S	2006
Lance Gunn	DB	1992
Britt Hager	LB	1988
Glen Halsell	LB	1969*
Casey Hampton	DT	1999, 2000*
Aaron Harris	LB	2005
Dick Harris	OT	1947
Scott Henderson	LB	1970
Tony Hills	OG	2007
Tillman Holloway	OG	2003
Michael Huff	S	2005*‡
Jay Humphrey	OT	1998
Quentin Jammer	CB	2001*
Derrick Johnson	LB	2003*, 2004*‡
Johnnie Johnson	DB	1978*‡, 1979*‡
Johnny "Lam" Jones	WR	1978, 1979
Malcolm Kutner	SE (OL)	1941
Bobby Layne	QB	1946, 1947*
Roosevelt Leaks	RB	1973*
Jeff Leiding	LB	1983*
Carlton Massey	DE	1953*
Colt McCoy	QB	2008*
Bud McFadin	OG	1949, 1950*‡
Bob McKay	OT	1969*
Steve McMichael	DT	1978, 1979*‡
Don Menasco	DE	1950
Dan Neil	OG	1995, 1996*
Tommy Nobis	OG/LB	1964, 1965*‡
Brian Orakpo	DE	2008*‡
Joe Parker	DE	1943
Cory Redding	DE	2001, 2002
Stanley Richard	DB	1990
Corby Robertson	LB	1967
Roger Roesler	OG	1999
Aaron Ross	CB	2006
James Saxton	RB	1961*‡
Jonathan Scott	OT	2005*‡
Harley Sewell	OG	1952
Brad Shearer	DT	1977*‡
Jordan Shipley	WR	2009*
Bob Simmons	OT	1974, 1975*
Kenneth Sims	DT	1980*, 1981*‡
Jerry Sisemore	OT	1971*‡, 1972*‡
Cotton Speyrer	WR	1969, 1970
Kris Stockton	PK	2000
Tom Stolhandske	DE	1952
Don Talbert	DT	1961
Terry Tausch	OT	1981*
Earl Thomas	S	2009*
Johnny Treadwell	G	1962*‡
Kenny Vaccaro	S	2012
Nathan Vasher	CB	2001, 2003
Loyd Wainscott	DT	1968
Jeff Ward	PK	1986
Bryant Westbrook	CB	1996
Connor Williams	OT	2016
Mike Williams	OT	2001*
Ricky Williams	RB	1997*‡, 1998*‡
Roy Williams	WR	2003
Steve Worster	FB	1969, 1970*
Rodrique Wright	DT	2005*
Bob Wuensch	OT	1969, 1970*
Bill Wyman	C	1973*‡
Vince Young	QB	2005*
Malik Jefferson	LB	2017
Sam Cosmi	OL	2020
Joseph Ossai	LB	2020*
Bijan Robinson	RB	2022*‡
Jaylan Ford	LB	2022
T'Vondre Sweat	DT	2023 *‡
Xavier Worthy	AP/PR	2023
Byron Murphy II	DT	2023
Kelvin Banks Jr.	OT	2023, 2024*‡
Alfred Collins	DT	2024
Anthony Hill	LB	2024
Michael Taaffe	DB	2024, 2025
Jahdae Barron	DB	2024*
Colin Simmons	DE	2024
Ryan Niblett	PR/KR	2025
