= 1949 All-Skyline Six Conference football team =

American college football team

The 1949 All-Skyline Six Conference football team consists of American football players selected to the All-Skyline Six team selected by the Deseret News for the 1949 college football season.

== All Skyline selections ==
=== Ends ===
- Mike Peterson, Denver
- Marv Hess, Utah
- George Jones, Colorado A&M
- Keith Hughes, Utah State

=== Tackles ===
- Thurman "Fum" McGraw, Colorado A&M
- John Koish, Wyoming
- Charles Peterson, Wyoming

=== Guards ===
- Wally Nalder, Utah
- Marlin Smith, Wyoming
- Dale Dodrill, Colorado A&M

=== Centers ===
- Fred Toucher, Wyoming

=== Quarterbacks ===
- Sam Etcheverry, Denver
- Jack Christiansen, Colorado A&M

=== Halfbacks ===
- Bob Matthews, Utah
- Walker Jones, Wyoming
- Hal Pfeiffer, Denver
- Rex Berry, BYU

=== Fullbacks ===
- Eddie Talboom, Wyoming
- Dasel Hallmark, Colorado A&M

== See also ==
- 1949 College Football All-America Team
