= Ralph Pasquariello =

American football player (1926–1999)

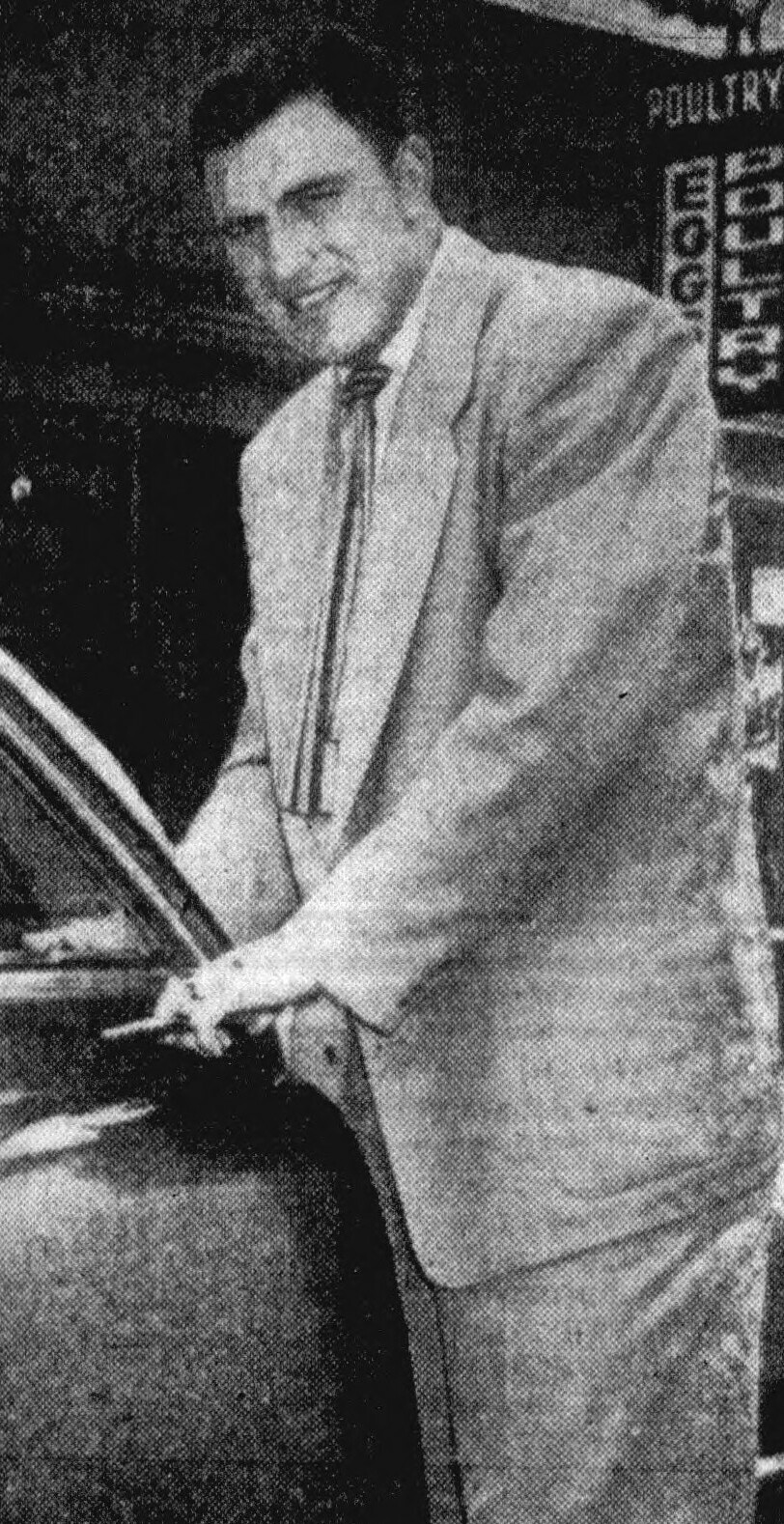
- Pasquariello in 1950

No. 36
- Position: Fullback

Personal information
- Born: May 30, 1926; Boston, Massachusetts, U.S.
- Died: January 5, 1999 (aged 72); Plantation, Florida, U.S.
- Listed height: 6 ft 2 in (1.88 m)
- Listed weight: 237 lb (108 kg)

Career information
- High school: Everett (Everett, Massachusetts)
- College: Villanova
- NFL draft: 1950: 1st round, 9th overall pick

Career history
- Los Angeles Rams (1950); Chicago Cardinals (1951–1952)

Awards and highlights
- Second-team All-Eastern (1949)

Career NFL statistics
- Rushing yards: 411
- Rushing average: 3.8
- Receptions: 10
- Receiving yards: 39
- Total touchdowns: 2
- Stats at Pro Football Reference

Ralph Angelo Pasquariello (May 30, 1926 – January 5, 1999) was an American professional football player who was a fullback for the Los Angeles Rams and Chicago Cardinals of the National Football League (NFL). He played college football for the Villanova Wildcats

== Early life ==
Pasquariello authored an impressive record during his gridiron career, beginning at Everett High School where he was named "all-scholastic" in 1944.

== College career ==
Pasquariello served in the US Army during World War II before attending Villanova University. He was a record setting fullback for Villanova from 1946 to 1949. During that four-year period, Villanova won 28 games, lost only 10 and tied 2. Pasquariello set a record for most carries with 380 and was second in individual career rushing with 1815 net yards gained. Also during his college career, he played in the Great Lakes Bowl, was named to six all-star teams, including the All-America College Selection in 1948 and 1949, the All-American Catholic and All-East elevens, and the Associated Press All-Pennsylvania team. In 1949, he scored the winning touchdown in the North–South Shrine Game, and was given the MVP award.

== Professional ==
His talents spread to the pro circuit, playing fullback for the Los Angeles Rams. Pasquariello was the first round draft pick for the Rams in 1950. His 1950 NFL contract was for $7,500 plus a signing bonus of $1,900. He later spent three years with the Chicago Cardinals (1951–1953). The Chicago Cardinals contract for 1954 was signed, but due to a knee injury Pasquariello was forced to retire with after 4 years.

== Honors ==
The Annual Ralph Pasquariello Award, established in his honor by the Villanova Club of Boston, is given to the outstanding backfield performer in the Villanova-Boston College game.

In 1981, he was honored by being inducted into the Villanova University Varsity Club (Villanova University Hall of Fame).

On October 26, 2018, the two sons Ralph Jr and Stephen Pasquariello presented Villanova University with the 1949 All Star game MVP trophy. The trophy is displayed in the Football Office. There are only two trophies of its kind, the other resides in Canton Ohio in the NFL Hall of Fame and was awarded to Charley Trippi in 1945.

Family- Both of Ralph’s sons followed in his footsteps. Ralph Jr ‘78 was recruited by Coach Lou Ferry ’49 (a former teammate of Ralph Sr.) played four years at Villanova from 1974-77. One of his teammates was Howie Long ’82 who incidentally in 1980 was the only other player from Villanova to ever win an MVP trophy for the Blue–Gray Football Classic (North-South game). Ralph's son Stephen played at Villanova for one season in 1980, before transferring to University of New Hampshire after the Wildcats went without football for a short time.
