= 1949 All-Big Seven Conference football team =

The 1949 All-Big Seven Conference football team consists of American football players chosen by various organizations for All-Big Six Conference teams for the 1949 college football season. The selectors for the 1949 season included the Associated Press (AP) and United Press (UP). Players who were the consensus first-team selection of both the AP and UP are shown in bold.

== All-Big Seven selections ==
=== Backs ===
- **Darrell Royal**, Oklahoma (AP-1; UP-1 [QB]) (College Football Hall of Fame)
- **George Thomas**, Oklahoma (AP-1; UP-1)
- **Dick Braznell**, Missouri (AP-1; UP-1)
- Bill Weeks, Iowa State (AP-1)
- John Glorioso, Missouri (AP-2; UP-1)
- Lindell Pearson, Oklahoma (AP-2)
- Bud French, Kansas (AP-2)
- Leon Heath, Oklahoma (AP-2)

=== Ends ===
- **Jim Owens**, Oklahoma (AP-1; UP-1)
- **Jim Doran**, Iowa State (AP-1; UP-1)
- Gene Ackerman, Missouri (AP-2)
- Bobby Goad, Oklahoma (AP-2)

=== Tackles ===
- **Wade Walker**, Oklahoma (AP-1; UP-1)
- **Charlie Toogood**, Nebraska (AP-1; UP-1)
- Leon Manley, Oklahoma (AP-2)
- Peter Thompson, Colorado (AP-2)

=== Guards ===
- **Stan West**, Oklahoma (AP-1; UP-1)
- **Dick Tomlinson**, Kansas (AP-1; UP-1)
- Gene Pepper, Missouri (AP-2)
- Dee Andros, Oklahoma (AP-2)

=== Centers ===
- **Tom Novak**, Nebraska (AP-1; UP-1)
- Robert Fuchs, Missouri (AP-2)

== Key ==
AP = Associated Press

UP = United Press

== See also ==
- 1949 College Football All-America Team
