= Bernie Barkouskie =

American football player (1928–1998)

Profile
- Position: Guard

Personal information
- Born: June 5, 1928; Kulpmont, Pennsylvania, U.S.
- Died: May 10, 1998 (aged 69); Bethlehem, Pennsylvania, U.S.
- Listed height: 5 ft 10 in (1.78 m)
- Listed weight: 200 lb (91 kg)

Career information
- High school: Wilkes-Barre (Wilkes-Barre, Pennsylvania)
- College: Pittsburgh
- NFL draft: 1950: 16th round, 204th overall pick

Awards and highlights
- First-team All-American (1949); First-team All-Eastern (1949)

Bernard Joseph Barkouskie (June 5, 1928 – May 10, 1998) was an American football player. He played college football for the Pittsburgh Panthers football team at the guard position from 1947 to 1949. He was selected by Collier's Weekly, the International News Service, and the Newspaper Enterprise Association as a first-team player on the 1949 College Football All-America Team. After graduating from Pitt in 1950, Barkouskie trained with the Pittsburgh Steelers and appeared in an exhibition game, but he opted to join the United States Navy in August 1950 instead of pursuing a career in professional football. He served as a pilot in the Korean War and later worked for Englehard Corp. from 1967 to 1993. He died in Bethlehem, Pennsylvania in 1998.
