= George Petrovich (American football) =

American football player (1926–2010)

No. 18
- Positions: Guard, tackle, defensive tackle

Personal information
- Born: March 22, 1926; Palestine, Texas, U.S.
- Died: March 31, 2010 (aged 84); Garland, Texas, U.S.
- Listed height: 6 ft 2 in (1.88 m)
- Listed weight: 225 lb (102 kg)

Career information
- High school: Palestine
- College: Texas (1944, 1947–1948)
- NFL draft: 1948: 15th round, 135th overall pick

Career history
- Chicago Cardinals (1949–1950)

Awards and highlights
- First-team All-SWC (1948); 1949 Orange Bowl Champion; 1948 Sugar Bowl Champion

Career NFL statistics
- Games played: 22
- Games started: 15
- Stats at Pro Football Reference

George John Petrovich Jr. (March 22, 1926 – March 31, 2010) was an American professional football guard, tackle, and defensive tackle.

A native of Palestine, Texas, he played college football for the Texas Longhorns in 1943 and 1944. His athletic career was interrupted in February 1945 when he was inducted into the United States Army. After his military service, he returned to Texas and played at the tackle position for the 1947 and 1948 Texas Longhorns football teams. He then played professional football in the National Football League (NFL) as a guard for the Chicago Cardinals during the 1949 and 1950 seasons. He appeared in a total of 22 NFL games.

At Texas, he played in and helped win the 1948 Sugar Bowl with a team that finished ranked 5th; and in the 1949 Orange Bowl in which the Longhorns upset #8 Georgia.
