= Odell Stautzenberger =

American football player (1924–2002)

No. 32
- Position: Offensive guard

Personal information
- Born: October 23, 1924; San Antonio, Texas, U.S.
- Died: May 5, 2002 (aged 77); Alexandria, Louisiana, U.S.
- Listed height: 6 ft 1 in (1.85 m)
- Listed weight: 218 lb (99 kg)

Career information
- High school: Thomas Jefferson (San Antonio)
- College: Texas A&M (1946-1948)
- NFL draft: 1947: 27th round, 247th overall pick

Career history
- Cleveland Browns (1949)*; Buffalo Bills (1949)
- * Offseason or practice squad member only

Awards and highlights
- First-team All-SWC (1948); Second-team All-SWC (1946)

Career AAFC statistics
- Games played: 9
- Stats at Pro Football Reference

Weldon Odell Stautzenberger (October 23, 1924 – May 5, 2002) was an American football offensive guard.

Stautzenberger was born in 1924 in San Antonio, Texas. He attended Thomas Jefferson High School in San Antonio. After graduating from high school, he enrolled at Texas A&M University. During World War II, he served with the United States Marine Corps in the Pacific Theater.

After the war, Stautzenberger played college football at Texas A&M during the 1946, 1947, and 1948 seasons. He then played one season of professional football in the All-America Football Conference (AAFC) for the Buffalo Bills. He was drafted in the 27th round of the 1947 NFL draft by the Boston Yanks and was also a member of the Cleveland Browns. He appeared in nine games during the 1949 season, starting six.

Stautzenberger died on May 5, 2002, in Alexandria, Louisiana.
