= Jim Winkler (American football) =

American football player (1927–2001)

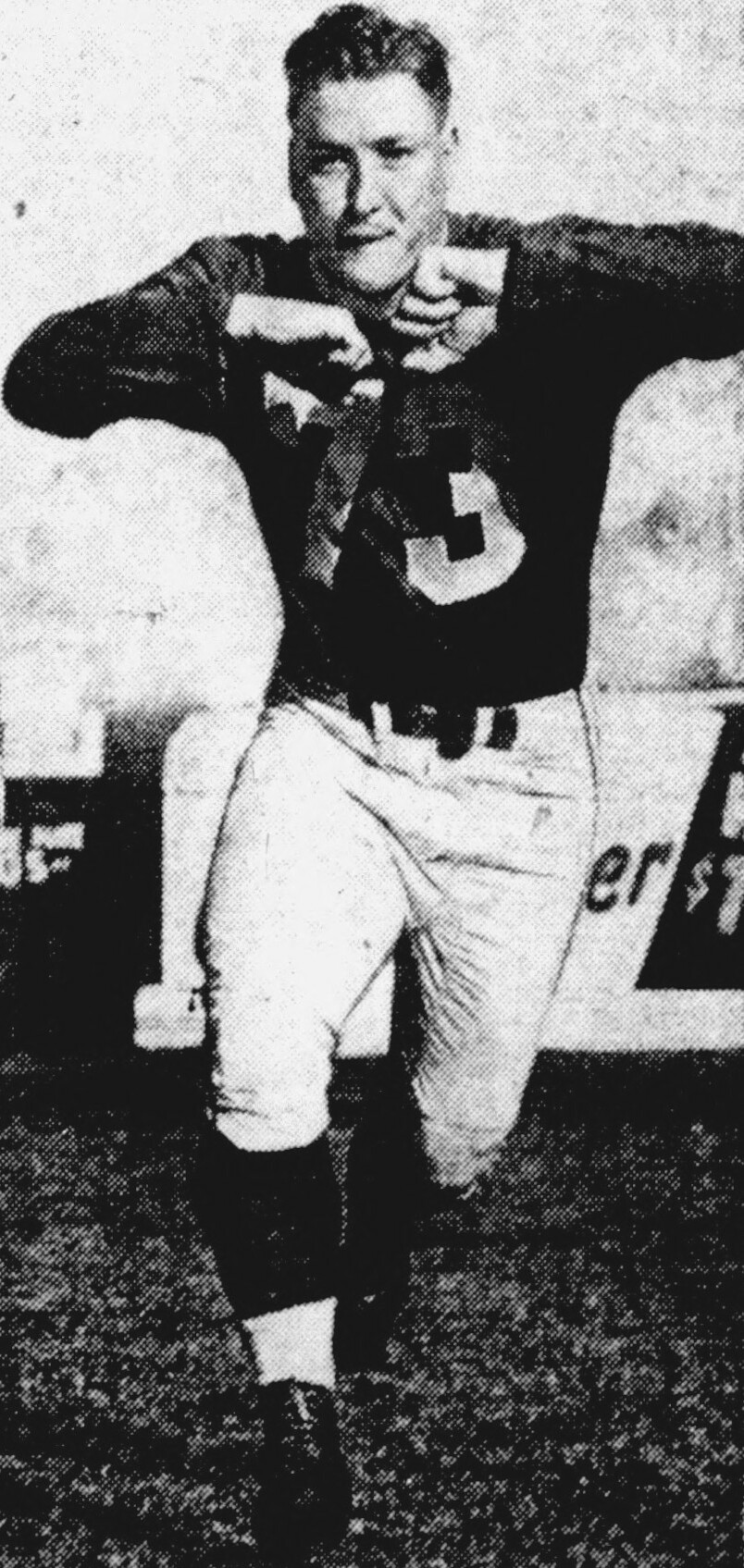
- Winkler, circa 1953

No. 78, 76
- Positions: Defensive tackle, guard

Personal information
- Born: July 21, 1927; Moody, Texas, U.S.
- Died: February 14, 2001 (aged 73); Ventura, California, U.S.
- Listed height: 6 ft 2 in (1.88 m)
- Listed weight: 250 lb (113 kg)

Career information
- High school: Temple (Temple, Texas)
- College: Texas A&M
- NFL draft: 1949: 3rd round, 27th overall pick

Career history
- Los Angeles Rams (1951–1952); Baltimore Colts (1953)

Awards and highlights
- NFL champion (1951); Pro Bowl (1952); 2× First-team All-SWC (1947, 1948)

Career NFL statistics
- Games played: 32
- Games started: 24
- Fumble recoveries: 2
- Stats at Pro Football Reference

James "the Perch" Carl Winkler (July 21, 1927 – February 14, 2001) was a defensive lineman who played three seasons in the National Football League (NFL).

In his autobiography, NFL Hall of Famer Art Donovan described Winkler as "the craziest football player I have ever met," and he shared this anecdote, among others: "When he joined us, we immediately dubbed him "the Perch", because he had a face like a fish. Plus, he was always twitching his neck and his jaw and contorting his face. He always swore he had a broken jaw. And he was constantly socking himself in the mouth to try to straighten it out. I swear to God, he'd haul off every few hours and punch himself as hard as he could right in the face. He acted like a true psycho. And he was a big guy, about six-three and 270." Donovan went on to describe how Winkler once refused to play in a game against the Rams because they were his former teammates. Another anecdote describes a time when Winkler got a scratch on his face during a practice. When teammate Ken Jackson joked that Winkler's face needed stitches, Winkler took him seriously and went ballistic after team trainer Eddie Block told him that it was really only a scratch and did not require stitches. He started destroying the locker room and was sent home.

An article in the July 25, 1954 issue of The Baltimore Sun acknowledged that Winkler experienced personal problems in his lone season with the Colts but stated that Winkler asked Coach Weeb Ewbank for his release due to a shoulder injury. It also stated that he returned to Texas to live with his father, his wife, and his child.
