= Ed Bagdon =

American football player (1926–1990)

No. 55, 68
- Positions: Guard, linebacker

Personal information
- Born: April 30, 1926; Dearborn, Michigan, U.S.
- Died: October 25, 1990 (aged 64); Hesperia, California, U.S.
- Listed height: 5 ft 10 in (1.78 m)
- Listed weight: 204 lb (93 kg)

Career information
- High school: Fordson (Dearborn)
- College: Michigan State (1946–1949)
- NFL draft: 1950: 7th round, 87th overall pick

Career history
- Chicago Cardinals (1950–1951); Washington Redskins (1952); Cleveland Browns (1953)*
- * Offseason or practice squad member only

Awards and highlights
- Outland Trophy (1949); Consensus All-American (1949)

Career NFL statistics
- Games played: 26
- Games started: 16
- Stats at Pro Football Reference

Edward Bagdon (April 30, 1926 – October 25, 1990) was an American professional football offensive lineman in the National Football League (NFL) for the Chicago Cardinals and the Washington Redskins. He played college football at Michigan State University and was drafted in the seventh round of the 1950 NFL draft.

== Career ==
From 1946 until 1949, Bagdon studied and played American football at Michigan State University as a three-year letterman. In 1949, he won the Outland Trophy.

== Personal life ==
Bagdon died in Hesperia on October 25, 1990.
