= Sam Lyle =

American football player and coach (1924–2007)

No. 33
- Position: End

Personal information
- Born: June 18, 1924
- Died: May 25, 2007 (aged 82); Atlanta, Georgia, U.S.

Career information
- College: LSU
- NFL draft: 1950: 10th round, 120th overall pick

Career history
- 1951–1953: Georgia Tech (ends)
- 1954–1957: Oklahoma (assistant)
- 1958: Edmonton Eskimos
- 1959: Florida (assistant)
- 1960: South Carolina (assistant HC)

Awards and highlights
- First-team All-SEC (1949)

Melvin E. "Sam" Lyle (June 18, 1924 – May 25, 2007) was an American football player, coach, and the founder of the Bobby Dodd Coach of the Year Award.

== Playing career ==
Lyle played end at Louisiana State University from 1947 to 1949. He was the captain of the LSU Tigers team that played in the 1950 Sugar Bowl. He was drafted by the New York Bulldogs in the tenth round of the 1950 NFL draft.

== Coaching career ==
Lyle began his coaching career in 1951 as the ends coach at Georgia Tech under Bobby Dodd. He was an assistant on the Yellow Jacket teams that won the 1952 Orange Bowl and the 1953 and 1954 Sugar Bowls. In 1954, he moved to Oklahoma, where he was an assistant under future College Football Hall of Famer Bud Wilkinson. In his second and third seasons at Oklahoma, the Sooners won the College football national championship.

In 1958, Lyle succeeded another former Oklahoma assistant, Pop Ivy, as head coach of the Edmonton Eskimos. He resigned after only one season and returned to college football as an assistant at Florida.

== Head coaching record ==
Team	Year	Regular season					Postseason			
Team	Year	Won	Lost	Ties	Win %	Finish	Won	Lost	Win %	Result
EDM	1958	9	6	1	.594	2nd in WIFU	1	2	.333	Lost in WIFU Final 1–2
Total		9	6	1	.594		3	2	.600	

== Bobby Dodd Award ==
In 1976, Lyle created the Bobby Dodd Coach of the Year Award. The award, named after former Georgia Tech coach Bobby Dodd, is an awarded annually to the college football head coach whose team excels on the field, in the classroom, and in the community. Lyle also served as the chairman of the executive committee of the American Sportsmanship Council, the group who sponsored the Bobby Dodd Award.

== Death ==
Lyle died of kidney failure on May 25, 2007, in Atlanta.
