= Randy Clay =

American football player (1928–2006)

No. 12
- Positions: Halfback, defensive back, placekicker

Personal information
- Born: May 30, 1928; Shamrock, Texas, U.S.
- Died: July 19, 2006 (aged 78); San Antonio, Texas, U.S.
- Listed height: 6 ft 0 in (1.83 m)
- Listed weight: 188 lb (85 kg)

Career information
- High school: Pampa (TX)
- College: Texas
- NFL draft: 1950: 3rd round, 33rd overall pick

Career history
- New York Giants (1950, 1953)

Awards and highlights
- First-team All-American (1949); 1950 Southwest Conference Track and Field Champion; All-Army Football Team - (1951, 1952); 1948 Sugar Bowl Champion; 1949 Orange Bowl Champion; 1951 Cigar Bowl Champion

Career NFL statistics
- Rushing yards: 280
- Rushing average: 3.1
- Receptions: 12
- Receiving yards: 120
- Total touchdowns: 3
- Stats at Pro Football Reference

Oscar Randall "Randy" Clay (May 30, 1928 – July 19, 2006) was an American professional football halfback, defensive back and kicker. He played for the New York Giants in 1950 and 1953 and was an All-American at the University of Texas.

== Early life ==
Clay was born in Shamrock, TX in and played high school football at Pampa High School in Pampa, Texas from 1943-1946 where he was an All-State halfback, on the All-State Basketball Team and the two-time State Champion at discus. He earned trips to both the Oil Bowl and the Texas High School All-Star Game.

In 1986 he was inducted into the Texas High School Football Hall of Fame. 1990 he was named to the Texas High School Sports Hall of Fame. He was also the 28th inductee to the Panhandle Sports Hall of Fame and was named a Top 100 Sports Legends of the Panhandle in 2000.

== College career ==
Clay played football and ran track at Texas from 1947-49 where he was a back and led the team in scoring in both 1948 and 1949.

In 1947 he helped the Longhorns win the 1948 Sugar Bowl.

In 1948 he helped the Longhorns win the 1949 Orange Bowl, scoring the game-clinching touchdown against Georgia.

In 1949 he was a first team All-American as chosen by the Newspaper Enterprise Association and 2nd team All-Southwest Conference.

He finished as the school's 2nd leading rusher, with 1,076 yards and only the 2nd one to rush for more than 1000 yards in a career.

He also lettered in track in 1949 and 1950. At the end of his senior year, he came in 3rd in the discus throw and helped the Longhorns win the Southwest Conference Championship. He also anchored the relay team.

In 1977 he was named to the Texas Athletics Hall of Honor.

== Professional career ==
Clay was drafted by the Giants, #33 overall, in the third round of the 1950 NFL draft. He played in every game of the 1950 season including the playoff game, as the Giants won their division but lost to Cleveland in the playoffs. He scored a game-winning touchdown against the defending champion Eagles to upset them and virtually eliminate them from the playoffs.

He missed the 1951 and 52 seasons due to service in the Army, during which time he was stationed at Brooke Army Medical Center. While he was there he played football for the Comets, the medical center's football team and was named All-Army. He scored the Comet's game winning field goal against San Diego Naval Training Center's team in 1951. He led the team to victory over Camp Lejeune, scoring the go ahead touchdown, in the 1951 Cigar Bowl.

He returned to the Giants for the 1953 season and again played in every game.

Over his NFL career, he had 400 yards from scrimmage, 3 touchdowns; kicked 3 field goals and 20 extra points (including the team's only score in his one playoff appearance); had 4 interceptions on defense and 5 fumble recoveries and returned 2 kickoffs to give him 509 all-purpose yards.

== Later life ==
When his pro career ended, Clay continued to be involved in sports, business and his community. He moved into officiating and officiated numerous high school football and college bowl games. He was the first Sports Anchor and Sports Director at WOAI Channel 4 in San Antonio. Later he opened his own insurance company.

He died in San Antonio, Texas in 2006 from cancer.
