= Dick McKissack =

American football player (1926–1982)

No. 38
- Position: Defensive back

Personal information
- Born: February 10, 1926; San Antonio, Texas, U.S.
- Died: August 28, 1982 (aged 56); Dallas, Texas, U.S.
- Listed height: 6 ft 2 in (1.88 m)
- Listed weight: 208 lb (94 kg)

Career information
- High school: Thomas Jefferson (San Antonio)
- College: SMU
- NFL draft: 1950: 5th round, 64th overall pick

Career history
- Dallas Texans (1952)

Awards and highlights
- First-team All-SWC (1948); Second-team All-SWC (1947)
- Stats at Pro Football Reference

James Richard McKissack (February 10, 1926 – August 28, 1982) was an American professional football player and later a politician. Born in San Antonio, Texas, McKissack played college football for Southern Methodist University. He was drafted by the Los Angeles Rams in the 5th round (64th overall) of the 1950 NFL draft. He played for one season (1952) at defensive back for the Dallas Texans He later served in the Texas House of Representatives (1965–1973).
