= 1949 All-SEC football team =

American college football all-star team

The 1949 All-SEC football team consists of American football players selected to the All-Southeastern Conference (SEC) chosen by various selectors for the 1949 college football season. Tulane won the conference.

== All-SEC selections ==
=== Ends ===
- Bud Sherrod, Tennessee (AP-1, UP-1)
- Sam Lyle, LSU (AP-1, UP-2)
- Jack Stribling, Ole Miss (AP-2, UP-1)
- Bobby Walston, Georgia (AP-2, UP-2)
- Bucky Curtis, Vanderbilt (AP-3)
- Dick Harvin, Georgia Tech (AP-3)

=== Tackles ===
- Bob Gain, Kentucky (College Football Hall of Fame) (AP-1, UP-1)
- Paul Lea, Tulane (AP-1, UP-2)
- Ray Collins, LSU (AP-2, UP-2)
- Carl Copp, Vanderbilt (AP-3, UP-1)
- Tom Coleman, Georgia Tech (AP-2)
- Marion Campbell, Georgia (AP-3)

=== Guards ===
- Ed Holdnak, Alabama (AP-1, UP-1)
- Allen Hover, LSU (AP-1, UP-2)
- Jimmy Crawford, Ole Miss (AP-2, UP-1)
- Dennis Doyle, Tulane (AP-2, UP-2)
- Mike Mizerany, Alabama (AP-3)
- Ted Daffer, Tennessee (AP-3)

=== Centers ===
- Harry Ulinski, Kentucky (AP-1, UP-1)
- Jerry Taylor, Miss. St. (AP-2, UP-2)
- Jimmy Kynes, Florida (AP-3)

=== Quarterbacks ===
- Travis Tidwell, Auburn (AP-1, UP-1)
- Babe Parilli, Kentucky (AP-2, UP-2)

=== Halfbacks ===
- Eddie Price, Tulane (College Football Hall of Fame) (AP-1, UP-1)
- Chuck Hunsinger, Florida (AP-1, UP-1)
- Jimmy Jordan, Georgia Tech (AP-2)
- Herb Rich, Vanderbilt (AP-2)
- Floyd Reid, Georgia (AP-3, UP-2)
- Ed Salem, Alabama (UP-2)
- Jimmy Roshto, LSU (UP-2)
- Don Phelps, Kentucky (AP-3)
- Butch Avinger, Alabama (AP-3)
- Lee Nalley, Vanderbilt (AP-3)

=== Fullbacks ===
- Kayo Dottley, Ole Miss (AP-1, UP-1)
- Zollie Toth, LSU (AP-2)

== Key ==
AP = Associated Press.

UP = United Press

Bold = Consensus first-team selection by both AP and UP

== See also ==
- 1949 College Football All-America Team
