= Zollie Toth =

American football player (1924–2018)

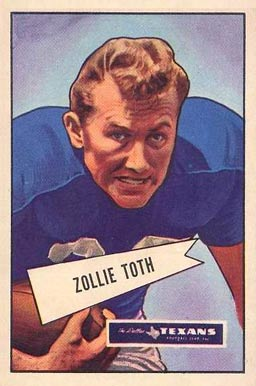
- Toth on a 1952 Bowman football card

No. 86, 33, 36, 84
- Position: Fullback

Personal information
- Born: January 26, 1924; Pocahontas, Virginia, U.S.
- Died: April 3, 2018 (aged 94)
- Listed height: 6 ft 2 in (1.88 m)
- Listed weight: 219 lb (99 kg)

Career information
- College: LSU
- NFL draft: 1950: 4th round, 42nd overall pick

Career history
- New York Yanks (1950–1951); Dallas Texans (1952); Baltimore Colts (1954); Hamilton Tiger-Cats (1956)

Awards and highlights
- Pro Bowl (1950); Second-team All-SEC (1949)

Career NFL statistics
- Rushing yards: 1,589
- Rushing average: 3.8
- Receptions: 49
- Receiving yards: 394
- Total touchdowns: 17
- Stats at Pro Football Reference

Zollie Anthony Toth (January 26, 1924 – April 3, 2018) was a former running back who played college football at LSU and played in the National Football League from 1950 to 1954. He was a veteran of World War II, serving in the US Navy. Toth died in April 2018 at the age of 94.

As a rookie, he became the first running back in NFL history to rush for 100 yards or more in his first two games as a pro.

== NFL career statistics ==
Legend
**Bold**	Career high

Year	Team	Games		Rushing					Receiving				
Year	Team	GP	GS	Att	Yds	Avg	Lng	TD	Rec	Yds	Avg	Lng	TD
1950	NYY	11	11	**131**	**636**	**4.9**	**59**	**5**	**15**	**189**	**12.6**	**60**	**3**
1951	NYY	10	10	119	384	3.2	16	4	10	100	10.0	23	0
1952	DTX	12	6	82	266	3.2	18	4	13	54	4.2	20	0
1954	BAL	12	11	86	303	3.5	15	1	11	51	4.6	13	0
Career		45	38	418	1,589	3.8	59	14	49	394	8.0	60	3
