= Arnold Galiffa =

American gridiron football player (1927–1978)

Arnie Galiffa
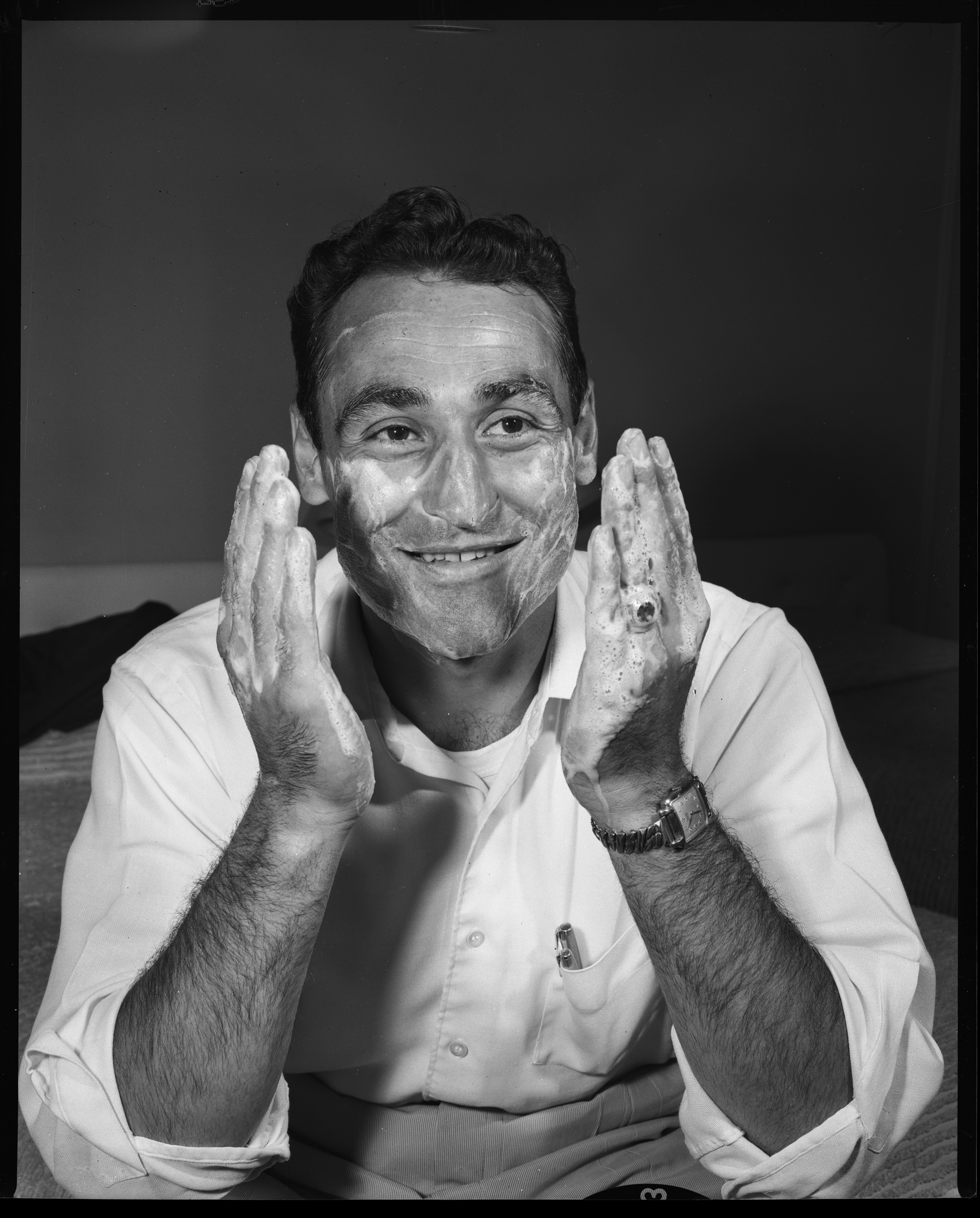
- Galiffa in July 1955 (Note: A crop of this photograph was published in The Province newspaper of Vancouver on July 8, 1955. Its caption read, in part, "Across 49th parallel came ex-San Francisco 49-er Arnold Galiffa this morning to join B.C. Lions. The famed quarterback was freshening up at Hotel Georgia when Province cameraman Gordon Sedawie caught him.")

No. 17, 16, 95, 83
- Position: Quarterback

Personal information
- Born: January 29, 1927; Donora, Pennsylvania, U.S.
- Died: September 5, 1978 (aged 51); Glenview, Illinois, U.S.
- Listed height: 6 ft 2 in (1.88 m)
- Listed weight: 193 lb (88 kg)

Career information
- College: Army
- NFL draft: 1950: 18th round, 225th overall pick

Career history
- New York Giants (1953); San Francisco 49ers (1954); BC Lions (1955–1956); Toronto Argonauts (1956)

Awards and highlights
- Consensus All-American (1949); Third-team All-American (1948); First-team All-Eastern (1949)

Career NFL statistics
- Passing attempts: 25
- Passing completions: 7
- Completion percentage: 28.0%
- TD–INT: 1–5
- Passing yards: 183
- Passer rating: 31.3
- Stats at Pro Football Reference
- College Football Hall of Fame

Arnold Anthony Galiffa (January 29, 1927 – September 5, 1978) was an American professional football player who was a quarterback in the National Football League (NFL) and Canadian Football League (CFL). He played college football for the Army Black Knights, then played professionally in both the NFL and CFL. He was inducted to the College Football Hall of Fame in 1983.

== Biography ==
Galiffa was born in and attended high school in Donora, Pennsylvania. (Note: Donora High School is now part of the Ringgold School District.) There, he played several sports and earned all-state honors in basketball and football; he graduated in 1945. In January 1946, Galiffa received an appointment to the United States Military Academy in West Point, New York; at the time, he was already a private in the United States Army.

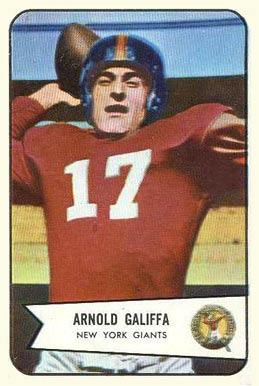
Galiffa's card in the 1954 Bowman Football Card Set

Galiffa played multiple sports for the Army Cadets, as they were then known, earning a total of 11 varsity letters: four in baseball, four in basketball, and three in football. For the four seasons he played football, 1946–1949, Army posted records of 9–0–1, 5–2–2, 8–0–1, and 9–0 for an aggregate record of 31–2–4 (.892) under head coach Earl Blaik. Galiffa was named to the 1949 All-Eastern football team, and was a consensus selection to the 1949 College Football All-America Team.

Galiffa graduated from West Point in June 1950, and was married that month to Margaret "Peggy" Perdok. Galiffa went on to serve as a second lieutenant during the Korean War.

After his military service, Galiffa played four seasons of professional football. He played in the NFL for the 1953 New York Giants, appearing in three games, and the 1954 San Francisco 49ers, appearing in four games. He next played in the CFL for two season. With the BC Lions, he played 14 games in 1955 but was released after one game in 1956, as the team opted to use Tony Teresa as their quarterback.

Galiffa was then signed by the Toronto Argonauts, who needed a new quarterback due to injury. In 12 games with the 1956 Toronto Argonauts, he passed for 3,682 yards and 32 touchdowns. Galiffa did not play professionally after 1956.

Outside of football, Galiffa worked for U.S. Steel for 23 years in operational staff services. In November 1957, he won a seat on the borough council in his hometown of Donora; as of February 1963, he was president of the council.

== Illness and death ==
Galiffa died from cancer in September 1978, and was survived by his wife and three children.

== Honors ==
Galiffa was inducted to the College Football Hall of Fame in 1983, and the Army Sports Hall of Fame in 2007.
