= Leon Manley =

American football player and coach (1926–2010)

No. 90, 66
- Positions: Guard, tackle

Personal information
- Born: May 20, 1926; Hollis, Oklahoma, U.S.
- Died: March 13, 2010 (aged 83); Austin, Texas, U.S.
- Listed height: 6 ft 2 in (1.88 m)
- Listed weight: 218 lb (99 kg)

Career information
- High school: Hollis
- College: Oklahoma (1946–1949)
- NFL draft: 1950: 7th round, 82nd overall pick

Career history

Playing
- Green Bay Packers (1950–1951); Edmonton Eskimos (1953–1954)

Coaching
- McAlester HS (OK) (1953) Head coach; Northeast Louisiana State (1954-1956) Line; Colgate (1957-1958) Line; Northeast Louisiana State (1959-1966) Line; Texas (1966-1974) Offensive line; Wyoming (1975-1976) Offensive line; Texas (1977-1980) Offensive coordinator

Awards and highlights
- Grey Cup champion (1954); CFL All-Star (1953); Second-team All-Big Seven (1949)

Career NFL statistics
- Games played: 24
- Games started: 12
- Stats at Pro Football Reference

Willie Leon Manley (May 20, 1926 – March 13, 2010) was an American professional football player and coach. He was born in Hollis, Oklahoma. He lettered for three seasons as guard at the University of Oklahoma from 1947 to 1949. He was selected in the seventh round of the 1950 NFL draft by the Green Bay Packers. He was on their roster in 1950 and 1951. Later from 1953 to '54 he played for the Edmonton Eskimos of the Western Interprovincial Football Union. After his playing career was through Manley pursued a coaching career and was a longtime assistant under Darrell Royal at Texas, first as offensive line coach and later succeeding Don Breaux as offensive coordinator. Royal was Manley's childhood friend and later a high school and college teammate.

Manley died in March 2010 in Austin, Texas.
