= 1949 All-Southwest Conference football team =

American college football all-star team

The 1949 All-Southwest Conference football team consists of American football players chosen by various organizations for All-Southwest Conference teams for the 1949 college football season. The selectors for the 1949 season included the Associated Press (AP) and the United Press (UP). Players selected as first-team players by both the AP and UP are designated in bold.

== All Southwest selections ==
=== Backs ===
- **Doak Walker**, SMU (AP-1, UP-1)
- **Adrian Burk**, Baylor (AP-1, UP-1)
- **Kyle Rote**, SMU (AP-1, UP-1)
- **Lindy Berry**, TCU (AP-1, UP-1)
- Bob Smith, Texas A&M (AP-2, UP-2)
- Paul Campbell, Texas (UP-2)
- Gordon Wyatt, Rice (UP-2)
- Geno Mazzanti, Arkansas (UP-2)
- Randy Clay, Texas (AP-2)
- Bobby Lantrip, Rice (AP-2)
- Leon Campbell, Arkansas (AP-2)

=== Ends ===
- **James "Froggy" Williams**, Rice (AP-1, UP-1)
- J. D. Ison, Baylor (AP-1, UP-1)
- Ben Proctor, Texas (AP-2, UP-2)
- Jack Wolcott, Rice (AP-2)
- Frank Fischel, Arkansas (UP-2)

=== Tackles ===
- **Ralph Murphy**, Rice (AP-1, UP-1)
- Harold Kilman, TCU (AP-1, UP-2)
- Bobby Collier, SMU (AP-2)
- John Lunney, Arkansas (AP-2, UP-2)

=== Guards ===
- **Don Mouser**, Baylor (AP-1, UP-1)
- **Bud McFadin**, Texas (AP-1, UP-1 [t])
- Dan Wolfe, Texas (UP-1)
- Carl Schwarz, Rice (AP-2)
- Jack Halliday, SMU (AP-2)
- Charles Stone, Baylor (UP-2)

=== Centers ===
- **Joe Watson**, Rice (AP-1, UP-1)
- Bones Weatherly, Rice (AP-2, UP-2 [g])
- Eugene Huebner, Baylor (UP-2)

== Key ==
AP = Associated Press

UP = United Press

Bold = Consensus first-team selection of both the AP and UP

== See also ==
- 1949 College Football All-America Team
