= Bud Sherrod =

American football player (1927–1980)

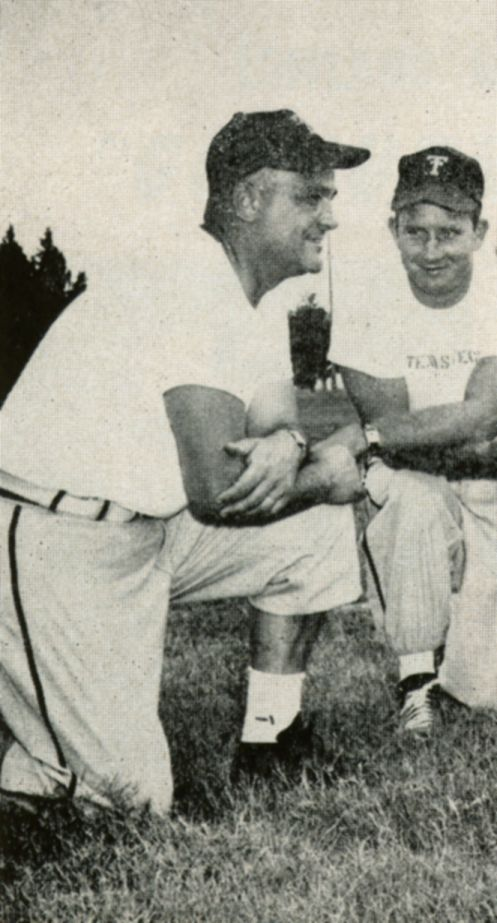
- Bud Sherrod (right) with DeWitt Weaver at Texas Tech

No. 83
- Positions: End, defensive end

Personal information
- Born: December 2, 1927; Knoxville, Tennessee, U.S.
- Died: August 31, 1980 (aged 52); Dallas, Texas, U.S.
- Listed height: 6 ft 0 in (1.83 m)
- Listed weight: 190 lb (86 kg)

Career information
- High school: Central (Knoxville)
- College: Tennessee (1947–1950)
- NFL draft: 1952: 17th round, 206th overall pick

Career history
- New York Giants (1952)

Awards and highlights
- Second-team All-American (1949); 2× First-team All-SEC (1949, 1950); 1951 Cotton Bowl Classic MVP

Career NFL statistics
- Fumble recoveries: 1
- Touchdowns: 1
- Stats at Pro Football Reference

Horace Monroe "Bud" Sherrod Jr. (December 2, 1927 – August 31, 1980) was an American professional football player who was an end in the National Football League (NFL) for the New York Giants in 1952. He played college football for the Tennessee Volunteers.

Sherrod also served as an assistant football coach for the Texas Tech Red Raiders from 1954 to 1957 under DeWitt Weaver.
