= Menan Schriewer =

American gridiron football player (1934–2013)

Profile
- Position: End

Personal information
- Born: September 20, 1934
- Died: December 30, 2013 (aged 79)
- Listed height: 6 ft 4 in (1.93 m)
- Listed weight: 215 lb (98 kg)

Career information
- High school: New Braunfels
- College: Texas
- NFL draft: 1956: 1st round, 10th overall pick

Career history
- 1956–1958: Toronto Argonauts
- 1959: Saskatchewan Roughriders
- 1960–1962: Toronto Argonauts

Awards and highlights
- CFL All-Star (1957); First-team All-SWC (1955); Longhorns Hall of Honor (2009)

Menan Clyde Schriewer (September 20, 1934 – December 30, 2013) was an American football and Canadian football end. He attended Texas, and was a three-year letterman. Schriewer led the Longhorns in receiving in his junior and senior years, and recorded a total of 42 receptions for 690 yards and four touchdowns in his career. Schriewer was drafted by the Chicago Bears of the National Football League (NFL) in the first round (tenth overall) of the 1956 NFL draft. However, Schriewer eventually joined the Canadian Football League's Toronto Argonauts, who offered Schriewer more money. With the Argonauts, Schriewer was named CFL All-Star in 1957. Schriewer joined the Saskatchewan Roughriders in 1959, but rejoined the Argos a year later. He was inducted into the Longhorns Hall of Honor in 2009. In Schriewer's honor, the Menan Schriewer Offensive Lineman of the Award was created.

Schriewer died on December 30, 2013, at the age of 79.

== See also ==
- List of Chicago Bears first-round draft picks
