= 1947 All-Southwest Conference football team =

American college football all-star team

The 1947 All-Southwest Conference football team consists of American football players chosen by various organizations for All-Southwest Conference teams for the 1947 college football season. The selectors for the 1947 season included the Associated Press (AP) and the United Press (UP). Players selected as first-team players by both the AP and UP are designated in bold.

== All Southwest selections ==
=== Backs ===
- Bobby Layne, Texas (AP-1)
- Doak Walker, SMU (AP-1)
- Clyde Scott, Arkansas (AP-1)
- Pete Stout, TCU (AP-1)
- Huey Keeney, Rice (AP-2)
- Tom Landry, Texas (AP-2)
- Lindy Berry, TCU (AP-2)
- Dick McKissack, SMU (AP-2)

=== Ends ===
- Max Bumgardner, Texas (AP-1)
- Sid Halliday, SMU (AP-1)
- James Williams, Rice (AP-2)
- Rick Reinking, SMU (AP-2)

=== Tackles ===
- Dick Harris, Texas (AP-1)
- Jim Winkler, SMU (AP-1)
- Weldon Edwards, TCU (AP-2)
- Buddy Tinsley, Baylor (AP-2)

=== Guards ===
- John Magee, Rice (AP-1)
- Earl Cook, SMU (AP-1)
- Charles Stone, Baylor (AP-2)
- Theron Roberts, Arkansas (AP-2)

=== Centers ===
- Joe Watson, Rice (AP-1)
- Cecil Sutphin, SMU (AP-2)

== Key ==
AP = Associated Press

UP = United Press

Bold = Consensus first-team selection of both the AP and UP

== See also ==
- 1947 College Football All-America Team
