= Jack Halliday =

American football player (1928–2000)

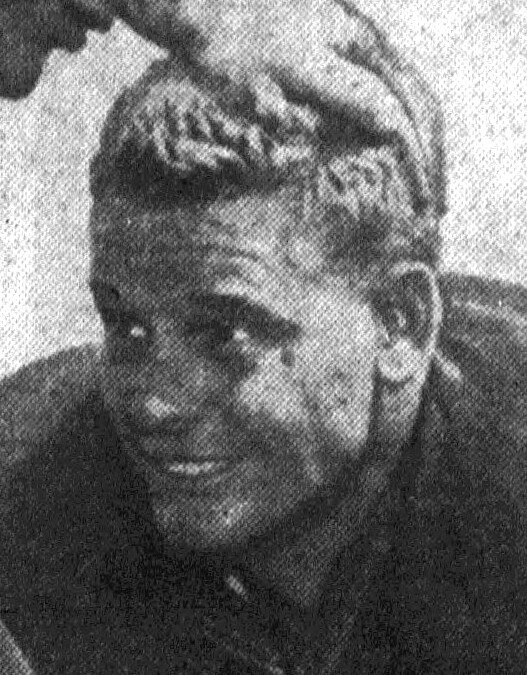
- Halliday, circa 1951

No. 73
- Position: Defensive tackle

Personal information
- Born: June 5, 1928; Dallas, Texas, U.S.
- Died: May 23, 2000 (aged 71); Gulfport, Mississippi, U.S.
- Listed height: 6 ft 3 in (1.91 m)
- Listed weight: 238 lb (108 kg)

Career information
- High school: Woodrow Wilson (Dallas)
- College: Southern Methodist (1946–1949)
- NFL draft: 1950: 5th round, 54th overall pick

Career history
- Los Angeles Rams (1951); Dallas Texans (1952)*
- * Offseason or practice squad member only

Awards and highlights
- NFL champion (1951); Second-team All-SWC (1949)
- Stats at Pro Football Reference

Jack Parker Halliday (June 5, 1928 – May 23, 2000) was an American professional football defensive tackle who played one season with the Los Angeles Rams of the National Football League (NFL). He played college football at Southern Methodist University.

== Early life ==
Jack Parker Halliday was born on June 5, 1928, in Dallas, Texas. He attended Woodrow Wilson High School in Dallas.

Halliday was a member of the SMU Mustangs of Southern Methodist University from 1946 to 1949 and a three-year letterman from 1947 to 1949. He was named second-team All-Southwest Conference by the Associated Press in 1949.

== Professional career ==
Halliday was selected by the Baltimore Colts in the fifth round, with the 54th overall pick, of the 1950 NFL draft. He signed with the Los Angeles Rams in 1951. He started all 12 games at right defensive tackle during the 1951 season. The Rams finished the year with an 8–4 record. Halliday also started for the Rams in the 1951 NFL Championship Game, a 24–17 victory over the Cleveland Browns. He became a free agent after the season.

Halliday signed with the Dallas Texans in 1952. He was later released on September 23, 1952, before the start of the season.

== Personal life ==
Halliday served in the United States Navy. His brother Sid Halliday also played at SMU.

He died on May 23, 2000, in Gulfport, Mississippi.
