= Hollie Donan =

American football player (1928–2014)

Profile
- Position: Defensive tackle

Personal information
- Born: June 24, 1928; Montclair, New Jersey, U.S.
- Died: March 4, 2014 (aged 85); Toms River, New Jersey, U.S.
- Listed height: 6 ft 5 in (1.96 m)
- Listed weight: 230 lb (104 kg)

Career information
- College: Princeton University

Awards and highlights
- First-team All-American (1950); Third-team All-American (1949); 2× First-team All-Eastern (1949, 1950)
- College Football Hall of Fame

Holland Donan (June 24, 1928 – March 4, 2014) was an American football defensive tackle. He played college football for Princeton University, graduating in 1951. He was elected to the College Football Hall of Fame in 1984.

Holland Donan was called the best tackle he ever coached by Princeton coach Charlie Caldwell. According to Caldwell, Donan's size, tremendous speed and uncanny ability to foresee enemy moves were what made him stand out among the nation's football athletes. Head line coach Dick Colman praised him for giving his teammates pep talks and boosting morale. In 1950, Donan led the Tigers to the Lambert Trophy and their first perfect record in 15 seasons. The 6–5, 230- pound bruiser helped arouse his team to a second half come- from-behind win that wiped out a 14-7 Navy lead. Princeton won, 20–14. Donan missed only two minutes on defense that season, and was named Lineman-of- the-Year as well as New Jersey's outstanding athlete.

Donan graduated from Princeton in the spring of 1951 with a degree in history, married the same year and entered the U.S. Army where he served in the Transportation Corps. When his military service obligation was over he entered the life insurance business, eventually opening two offices in New York City.
