= Max Bumgardner =

American football player and coach (1923–2005)

No. 36
- Positions: Defensive end, end

Personal information
- Born: May 13, 1923; Wichita Falls, Texas, U.S.
- Died: April 12, 2005 (aged 81); Greenville, Texas, U.S.
- Listed height: 6 ft 2 in (1.88 m)
- Listed weight: 190 lb (86 kg)

Career information
- High school: Wichita Falls
- College: Texas
- NFL draft: 1948: 1st round, 10th overall pick

Career history

Playing
- Detroit Lions (1948)

Coaching
- Denison HS (TX) (1949) Assistant coach; San Angelo (1950–1960) Head coach; Angelo State (1964–1968) Head coach

Operations
- San Angelo / Angelo State (1950–1968) Athletic director

Awards and highlights
- Third-team All-American (1947); First-team All-SWC (1947); Cotton Bowl champion - (1943); Sugar Bowl champion - (1948)
- Stats at Pro Football Reference

Max Andrew Bumgardner (May 13, 1923 – April 12, 2005) was an American football player and coach. After playing college football as an end at the University of Texas at Austin, where he earned a Bachelor of Science degree in physical education in 1948, he was selected in the first round, 10th overall, of the 1948 NFL draft by the Chicago Bears, but was sent to the Detroit Lions. He played for just one season in the National Football League (NFL), with the Lions.

Bumgardner grew up in the town of Chicken Ridge, Texas just outside of Wichita Falls.

Bumgardner started playing at Texas in 1942 under coach Dana X. Bible and helped the team win the Conference Championship and then the 1943 Cotton Bowl Classic. That year he also won the light-heavyweight boxing championship and was a golden gloves boxer. He left school to fight in World War II, where he was a staff sergeant in the Combat Engineering Corps and served in France and Germany before returning to school in 1946.

At Texas, he was captain of the 1947 Football team that won the 1948 Sugar Bowl and a favorite target of Bobby Layne. He, Layne and fellow end R.E. "Peppy" Blount were all drafted by the Bears in 1948. Bumgardner began his coaching career in 1949 at Denison High School in Denison, Texas, where he worked as an assistant under head football coach Les Cranfill. In 1950, he was hired as the head football coach and athletic director at San Angelo College—now known as Angelo State University—in San Angelo, Texas. He was named Texas Junior College Coach of the Year in 1951 and 1955. Bumgardner remained in that post as the school became a four-year college, renamed as Angelo State College ND playing in the NAIA, and then moved up to Division II of the NCAA in 1968. He resigned as head coach in 1968, but stayed on as athletic director until 1972.

In 1972 Emory Bellard, a UT assistant and inventor of the wishbone offense, became head football coach at Texas A&M, and he recruited Bumgardner to join his staff as an academic counselor, a job he maintained until 1979 when he retired from coaching and teaching.

He became marketing manager of a real estate firm in Bryan and in 1987, he retired to Pecan Plantation near Granbury, Texas. He moved to Greenville, Texas in 2001 to be near his daughter. He died of congestive heart failure on April 12, 2005, in Greenville and was buried in the family cemetery there.

== Head coaching record ==
=== College ===
Year	Team	Overall	Conference	Standing	Bowl/playoffs
Angelo State Rams (NAIA independent) (1964–1967)
1964	Angelo State	5–4			
1965	Angelo State	3–7			
1966	Angelo State	0–10			
1967	Angelo State	3–6			
Angelo State Rams (Lone Star Conference) (1968)
1968	Angelo State	2–9	N/A	N/A	
Angelo State:		13–36			
Total:		13–36			

=== Junior college ===
Year	Team	Overall	Conference	Standing	Bowl/playoffs
San Angelo Rams (Pioneer Conference) (1950–1960)
1950	San Angelo	8–2	3–0	1st	
1951	San Angelo	6–3	4–0	1st	
1952	San Angelo	5–4	1–3	5th	
1953	San Angelo	5–5	1–3	5th	
1954	San Angelo	5–3–1	2–1–1	2nd	
1955	San Angelo	8–2	4–0	1st	
1956	San Angelo	8–1	3–1	T–1st	
1957	San Angelo	4–5–1	2–2	3rd	
1958	San Angelo	5–5	2–4	T–4th	
1959	San Angelo	4–5	1–4	5th	
1960	San Angelo	7–3	3–1	2nd	
San Angelo:		65–38–2	26–19–2		
Total:		65–38–2			
National championship Conference title Conference division title or championship game berth

== See also ==
- List of Texas Longhorns football All-Americans
- List of Chicago Bears first-round draft picks
