= John Schweder =

American football player (1927–2005)

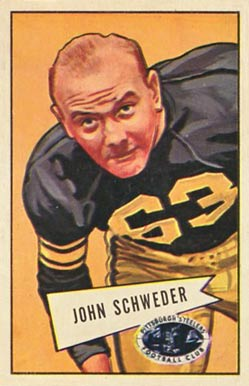
- Schweder on a 1952 Bowman football card

No. 37, 68, 66
- Positions: Guard, linebacker

Personal information
- Born: December 23, 1927; Bethlehem, Pennsylvania, U.S.
- Died: June 9, 2005 (aged 77); Bethlehem, Pennsylvania, U.S.
- Listed height: 6 ft 1 in (1.85 m)
- Listed weight: 224 lb (102 kg)

Career information
- High school: Liberty (Bethlehem)
- College: Pennsylvania
- NFL draft: 1951: 9th round, 103rd overall pick

Career history
- Baltimore Colts (1950); Pittsburgh Steelers (1951–1955)

Awards and highlights
- First-team All-American (1949); First-team All-Eastern (1949)

Career NFL statistics
- Games played: 71
- Games started: 56
- Fumble recoveries: 5
- Stats at Pro Football Reference

John A. "Bull" Schweder (December 23, 1927 – June 9, 2005) was an American professional football player who was an offensive lineman for six seasons with the Baltimore Colts and Pittsburgh Steelers of the National Football League (NFL). He played college football for the Penn Quakers.
