= Stan West =

American football player (1926–2005)

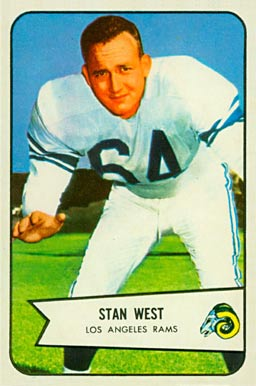
- West on a 1954 Bowman football card

No. 11, 64, 62, 55
- Positions: Guard, center

Personal information
- Born: September 22, 1926; Weatherford, Oklahoma, U.S.
- Died: January 19, 2005 (aged 78); Norman, Oklahoma, U.S.
- Listed height: 6 ft 2 in (1.88 m)
- Listed weight: 235 lb (107 kg)

Career information
- High school: Enid (Enid, Oklahoma)
- College: Oklahoma (1946–1949)
- NFL draft: 1950: 1st round, 12th overall pick

Career history

Playing
- Los Angeles Rams (1950–1954); New York Giants (1955); Chicago Cardinals (1956–1957)

Coaching
- Minnesota Vikings (1961–1963) Defensive line coach

Awards and highlights
- NFL champion (1951); First-team All-Pro (1952); Second-team All-Pro (1951); 2× Pro Bowl (1951-1952); First-team All-American (1949); First-team All-Big Seven (1949)

Career NFL statistics
- Games played: 85
- Games started: 73
- Fumble recoveries: 4
- Stats at Pro Football Reference

Stanley Bryon West (September 22, 1926 – January 19, 2005) was an American professional football player who was a defensive lineman in the National Football League (NFL) for the Los Angeles Rams, New York Giants, and Chicago Cardinals. He played college football for the Oklahoma Sooners under head coach Bud Wilkinson, who was quoted as saying that, "Stan West is one of the most talented players I have ever coached, exhibiting more raw talent than any other player on the team only to be matched by his toughness and dedication."
