= Harry Ulinski =

American football player (1925–2008)

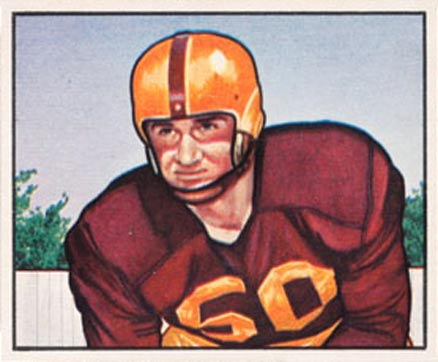
- Ulinski on a 1950 Bowman football card

No. 56, 41, 50
- Position: Center

Personal information
- Born: April 4, 1925; Ambridge, Pennsylvania, U.S.
- Died: April 20, 2008 (aged 83); St. Matthews, Kentucky, U.S.
- Listed height: 6 ft 4 in (1.93 m)
- Listed weight: 229 lb (104 kg)

Career information
- High school: Ambridge
- College: Kentucky
- NFL draft: 1950: 4th round, 45th overall pick

Career history
- Washington Redskins (1950–1951); Ottawa Rough Riders (1952); Washington Redskins (1953–1956)

Awards and highlights
- Pro Bowl (1955); First-team All-SEC (1949); UK Athletic Hall of Fame (2005)

Career NFL statistics
- Games played: 72
- Games started: 42
- Fumble recoveries: 2
- Stats at Pro Football Reference

Harry John Ulinski (April 4, 1925 – April 20, 2008) was an American professional football player who was an offensive lineman in the National Football League (NFL) for the Washington Redskins and the Ottawa Rough Riders of the Canadian Football League (CFL). He played college football for the Kentucky Wildcats and was selected in the fourth round of the 1950 NFL draft.

== Early life ==
Ulinski was born in Ambridge, Pennsylvania and attended Ambridge High School, where he played football, basketball and track. After graduating from high school, he served in the United States Army Air Forces during World War II from 1943 to 1946. He was inducted into the Beaver County, Pennsylvania Sports Hall of Fame in 1993.

== College career ==
After the war, Ulinski attended and played college football at the University of Kentucky under coach Bear Bryant. As a freshman, he shared quarterbacking duties with future Hall of Famer George Blanda but then switched to center and linebacker as a sophomore. In 1947, he played in Kentucky's first bowl game, a 24-14 win against Villanova University in the 1947 Great Lakes Bowl. He got married after his junior year and Bryant revoked his football scholarship. Ulinski considered transferring to Eastern Kentucky University to play basketball, but changed his mind after the marriage rule was rescinded. As team co-captain during his senior year, he led the team to the 1950 Orange Bowl against the University of Santa Clara, which they lost 21-13. After graduation, he played in the Chicago College All-Star Game against the Philadelphia Eagles and upset the Eagles, 17-7. Ulinski became a charter member of the UK Athletics Hall of Fame in 2005.

== Professional career ==
Ulinski was selected in the fourth round of the 1950 NFL draft by the Washington Redskins. He played center for the Redskins for two years before a contract dispute with owner George Preston Marshall forced him to go to the Ottawa Rough Riders of the Canadian Football League (CFL) for the 1952 season. After the hiring of Curly Lambeau as head coach, Ulinski rejoined the Redskins in 1953 and played for the franchise for four more seasons.

== Personal life ==
Ulinski was married to his wife, Ann, for 59 years and had two children. During the offseason, he usually worked as a substitute teacher, although one year he took a job digging ditches. After retiring from football in 1956, he lived in Louisville, Kentucky, where he worked as a salesman for Hubbell Metals and National Steel Corporation. He retired in the late 1980s.
