= John Magee (American football) =

American football player (1923–1991)

No. 67
- Position: Guard

Personal information
- Born: July 21, 1923; Robstown, Texas, U.S.
- Died: November 22, 1991 (aged 68); Kaplan, Louisiana, U.S.
- Listed height: 5 ft 10 in (1.78 m)
- Listed weight: 220 lb (100 kg)

Career information
- High school: Robstown
- College: Rice (1942, 1946-1947); Louisiana (1943)
- NFL draft: 1945: 22nd round, 228th overall pick

Career history
- Philadelphia Eagles (1948–1955)

Awards and highlights
- 2× NFL champion (1948, 1949); Third-team All-American (1947); First-team All-SWC (1947)

Career NFL statistics
- Games played: 91
- Games started: 52
- Fumble recoveries: 5
- Stats at Pro Football Reference

John Wesley Magee (July 21, 1923 – November 22, 1991) was an American professional football guard in the National Football League (NFL). He played eight seasons for the Philadelphia Eagles (1948–1955). He played college football at Southwestern Louisiana University and Rice University.
