= Ken Snyder =

- Education: Loyola University Chicago; University of Wisconsin
- Occupations: Principal, SnyderPickerill Media Group

Ken Snyder is a principal and co-founder of SnyderPickerill Media Group, a political media firm that specializes in the production of television advertising for political campaigns and candidates. Snyder was formerly a prominent press secretary and public relations manager. He is best known for his work with Democrats, including John F. Street, Ed Rendell, and Vince Fumo.

He earned a master's degree from Loyola University Chicago and pursued a Ph.D. at University of Wisconsin. He began his career working on John F. Street's first campaign for Mayor of Philadelphia. In that position, he became known to Senator Vince Fumo, who hired Snyder to work in the Senate Democratic Campaign Committee. During the 2002 United States Senate election in New Jersey, he managed the campaign for Bob Torricelli, a job that PoliticsPA called "masochism" and "a challenge and huge opportunity." After Torricelli was replaced by Frank Lautenberg on the ballot, Snyder stayed on the campaign and helped achieve victory.

Immediately following the Pennsylvania gubernatorial election in 2002, Fumo lent Snyder, who was one of Fumo's "key political staffers," to Ed Rendell, where he worked as acting press sectary for the Governor-elect from November 2002 to March 2003. He then returned to work in the private sector.

In 2009, he was hired by the Governor to serve as communications employee charged with publicizing the state's take of the American Recovery and Reinvestment Act of 2009. The controversial hiring, which appeared to violate Rendell's well-publicized state hiring freeze during the 2009 Pennsylvania budget impasse, was questioned by government reform advocates, including Eric Epstein. Later in 2009, he took on an expanded portfolio as interim press secretary with the departure of Chuck Ardo, Rendell's long-time press secretary.

He is "considered by many ... to be among the most intelligent spokesmen and strategists around." Within political circles, he is "widely regarded and respected by Republicans and Democrats alike." Overall, PoliticsPA called him "One of the best political press secretaries in the state."

In 2010, Politics Magazine named him one of the most influential Democrats in Pennsylvania.

In July 2010, Snyder and fellow political consultant Terrie Pickerill formed SnyderPickerill Media Group. They met while working for David Axelrod on John Schmidt's unsuccessful 1997 gubernatorial campaign, and both cite him as a mentor. Snyder's commercials for Cook County State's Attorney Anita Alvarez were deemed "brilliant" by the Reader's Mick Dumke, and a reason Alvarez, a political unknown, was able to win her race in 2008.
