= Bones Weatherly =

American football player (1928–2004)

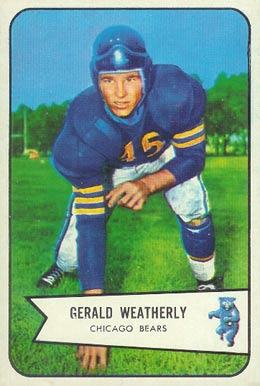
- Weatherly on a 1954 Bowman football card

No. 45, 84, 50
- Position: Linebacker

Personal information
- Born: December 26, 1928; Houston, Texas, U.S.
- Died: December 28, 2004 (aged 76); Cuero, Texas, U.S.
- Listed height: 6 ft 5 in (1.96 m)
- Listed weight: 218 lb (99 kg)

Career information
- High school: Cuero
- College: Rice (1945, 1947–1949)
- NFL draft: 1949: 8th round, 72nd overall pick

Career history
- Chicago Bears (1950, 1952–1954)

Awards and highlights
- Second-team All-SWC (1949)

Career NFL statistics
- Interceptions: 8
- Fumble recoveries: 5
- Total touchdowns: 3
- Stats at Pro Football Reference

Gerald Craft "Bones" Weatherly (December 26, 1928 – December 28, 2004) was an American professional football linebacker who played four seasons with the Chicago Bears of the National Football League (NFL). He was selected by the Bears in the eighth round of the 1949 NFL draft after playing college football at Rice Institute.

== Early life ==
Gerald Craft Weatherly was born on December 26, 1928, in Houston, Texas. He attended Cuero High School in Cuero, Texas.

== College career ==
Weatherly was a lettermen for the Rice Owls of Rice Institute in 1945, 1947, 1948, and 1949. He was named second-team All-Southwest Conference by both the Associated Press and United Press as a center in 1949. He was inducted into Rice's athletics hall of fame in 1974.

== Professional career ==
Weatherly was selected by the Chicago Bears in the eighth round, with the 72nd overall pick, of the 1949 NFL draft. He signed with the Bears on June 9, 1950. He played in six games, starting two, during the 1950 season, intercepting two passes for 58 yards and two touchdowns while also recovering one fumble. His two interception return touchdowns tied him for the league lead that year with Warren Lahr. Weatherly became a free agent after the 1950 season and missed the entire 1951 season due to being drafted into the United States Army. He played football at Fort Sam Houston while in the Army. He re-signed with the Bears on November 12, 1952. Weatherly appeared in five games, starting two, in 1952, recording three interceptions and one fumble recovery. He played in all 12 games, starting four, in 1953, totaling one interception and three fumble recoveries. He played in all 12 games for the second consecutive season, starting 11, in 1954, intercepting two passes for 56 yards. The Bears finished the year with an 8–4 record. Weatherly became a free agent after the 1954 season.

== Death ==
Weatherly died on December 28, 2004, in Cuero, Texas of "congestive heart failure secondary to cerebellar degeneration".
