= 1949 All-America college football team =

Official list of the best college football players of 1949

The 1949 All-America college football team is composed of college football players who were selected as All-Americans by various organizations and writers that chose All-America college football teams in 1949. The eight selectors recognized by the NCAA as "official" for the 1949 season are (1) the Associated Press, (2) the United Press, (3) the All-America Board, (4) the American Football Coaches Association (AFCA), (5) the Football Writers Association of America (FWAA), (6) the International News Service (INS), (7) the Newspaper Enterprise Association (NEA), and (8) the Sporting News.

== Consensus All-Americans ==
For the year 1949, the NCAA recognizes eight published All-American teams as "official" designations for purposes of its consensus determinations. The following chart identifies the NCAA-recognized consensus All-Americans and displays which first-team designations they received.

Name	Position	School	Number	Official	Other
Leon Hart	End	Notre Dame	8/8	AAB, AP, COL, FWAA, INS, NEA, SN, UP	NYS, PLAY, WC
Emil Sitko	Fullback	Notre Dame	8/8	AAB, AP, COL, FWAA, INS, NEA, SN, UP	NYS, PLAY, WC
Clayton Tonnemaker	Center	Minnesota	7/8	AAB AP, COL, FWAA, NEA, SN, UP	NYS, PLAY, WC
Rod Franz	Guard	California	7/8	AAB, AP, COL, FWAA, INS, SN, UP	NYS, WC
Doak Walker	Halfback	SMU	7/8	AAB, AP, FWAA, INS, NEA, SN, UP	PLAY
Arnold Galiffa	Quarterback	Army	6/8	AP, COL, FWAA, INS, SN, UP	NYS, PLAY, WC
Leo Nomellini	Tackle	Minnesota	6/8	AAB, COL, FWAA, NEA, SN, UP	WC
James Williams	End	Rice	4/8	AAB, AP, COL, FWAA	NYS, PLAY, WC
Alvin Wistert	Tackle	Michigan	4/8	AAB, INS, SN, UP	WC
Ed Bagdon	Guard	Michigan State	4/8	FWAA, NEA, SN, UP	WC
Bob Williams	Quarterback	Notre Dame	4/8	AAB, FWAA, SN, UP	WC

== All-American selections for 1949 ==
=== Ends ===
- Leon Hart, Notre Dame (College Football Hall of Fame) (AAB; AP-1; UP-1; COL-1; FWAA-1; SN; INSO; INSD; NEAO; NYS; WC-1; PLAY)
- James "Froggy" Williams, Rice (College Football Hall of Fame) (AAB; AP-1; UP-2; COL-1; FWAA-1; NYS; WC-1; PLAY)
- Art Weiner, North Carolina (College Football Hall of Fame)(UP-1; FWAA-2; SN; INSD)
- Dan Foldberg, Army (UP-2; FWAA-3; NEAO)
- Jim Owens, Oklahoma (College Football Hall of Fame) (INSO)
- Ken Rose, Stanford (NEAD)
- Kenny Powell, North Carolina (NEAD)
- J. D. Isom, Baylor (AP-2)
- Bud Sherrod, Tennessee (AP-2)
- Bud Grant, Minnesota (Pro Football Hall of Fame) (FWAA-2)
- Red Wilson, Wisconsin (AP-3; FWAA-3)
- Tom Rowe, Dartmouth (AP-3)

=== Tackles ===
- Leo Nomellini, Minnesota (College and Pro Football Hall of Fame) (AAB; UP-1; COL-1; FWAA-3; SN; NEAO [guard]; WC-1)
- Alvin Wistert, Michigan (College Football Hall of Fame) (AAB; AP-3; UP-1; SN; INSD; WC-1)
- Wade Walker, Oklahoma (AP-1; UP-2; FWAA-1; NEAO; COL-1)
- James Martin (College Football Hall of Fame), Notre Dame (AP-1; UP-2; FWAA-2; INSD; NEAD)
- Robert Wahl, Michigan (FWAA-1; NEAO)
- Bob Gain, Kentucky (College Football Hall of Fame)(AP-2; FWAA-2; NEAO [guard]; NYS; PLAY)
- Hollie Donan, Princeton (College Football Hall of Fame) (FWAA-3; PLAY)
- Jim Turner, California (INSO)
- Thurman "Fum" McGraw, Colorado A&M (College Football of Fame) (INSO)
- John Sandusky, Villanova (NYS)
- Ray Krouse, Maryland (AP-2)
- Lou Allen, Duke (AP-3)

=== Guards ===
- Rod Franz, California (College Football Hall of Fame) (AAB; AP-1; UP-1; COL-1; FWAA-1; SN; INSO; WC-1; NYS)
- Ed Bagdon, Michigan State (UP-1; FWAA-1; SN; NEAD [tackle]; WC-1)
- Bernie Barkouskie, Pittsburgh(AP-3; COL-1; INSD; NEAD)
- Stan West, Oklahoma (AAB; AP-2; UP-2; FWAA-2; NEAD; NYS; PLAY)
- Vern Sterling, Santa Clara (AP-3 [center]; FWAA-3; PLAY)
- John Schweder, Penn (AP-1; FWAA-2; INSO)
- Bud McFadin, Texas (College Football Hall of Fame) (INSD)
- Don Mason, Michigan State (AP-2; FWAA-3)
- George Toneff, Ohio State (UP-2)
- Jack Lininger, Ohio State (AP-3)

=== Centers ===
- Clayton Tonnemaker, Minnesota (College Football Hall of Fame) (AAB; AP-1; UP-1; COL-1; FWAA-1; SN; NEAD; NYS; WC-1; PLAY)
- Joe Watson, Rice (UP-2; FWAA-2; INSO; NEAO)
- Tom Novak, Nebraska (INSD)
- Jim Castagnoli, Stanford (AP-2)
- Bob Fuchs, Missouri (FWAA-3)

=== Backs ===
- Emil Sitko, Notre Dame (College Football Hall of Fame) (AAB; AP-1; UP-1; COL-1; FWAA-1; SN; INSO; NEAO; NYS; WC-1; PLAY)
- Doak Walker, Southern Methodist (SMU) (College and Pro Football Hall of Fame) (AAB; AP-1; UP-1; FWAA-1; SN; INSD; NEAO; PLAY)
- Arnold Galiffa, Army (AP-1; UP-1; COL-1; FWAA-1; SN; INSO; NYS; WC-1; PLAY)
- Bob Williams, Notre Dame (College Football Hall of Fame) (AAB; AP-2; UP-1; FWAA-1; SN; WC-1)
- Charlie Justice, North Carolina (AAB; AP-1; UP-2; COL-1; FWAA-3; INSO; PLAY)
- Eddie LeBaron, College of Pacific (UP-2; INSD; NEAO)
- Eddie Price, Tulane (College Football Hall of Fame) (AP-3; FWAA-2; INSO)
- Lynn Chandnois, Michigan State (UP-2; FWAA-2; INSD; COL-1)
- George Thomas, Oklahoma (FWAA-3; NEAD; NYS)
- George Sella, Princeton (NEAD; NYS)
- John Papit, Virginia (AP-3; NEAO)
- Darrell Royal, Oklahoma (INSD)
- Forrest Klein, California (NEAD)
- Randall Clay, Texas (NEAD)
- Chuck Ortmann, Michigan (AP-2; UP-2; FWAA-3)
- Bob Celeri, California (AP-2; FWAA-2)
- Hillary Chollet, Cornell (AP-2)
- Dick Kempthorn, Michigan (FWAA-2)
- Bob Zastrow, Navy (AP-3)
- Johnny Karras, Illinois (AP-3)
- Jim Cain, Army (FWAA-3)

== Key ==
- **Bold** – Consensus All-American
- -1 – First-team selection
- -2 – Second-team selection
- -3 – Third-team selection

=== Official selectors ===
- AP = Associated Press, chosen after recommendations from 250 sports editors, AP staff writers, college coaches, and radio broadcasters
- COL = Collier's Weekly, selected by the American Football Coaches Association
- FWAA = Look magazine, selected by Grantland Rice and the Football Writers Association of America
- INSO/INSD = International News Service offensive and defensive selections
- NEAO/NEAD = Newspaper Editors Association offensive and defensive All-American teams, selected by NEA sports editor Harry Grayson
- SN = Sporting News
- UP = United Press, selected for The United Press by 313 football writers and football broadcasters from all sections of the country

=== Other selectors ===
- CP = Central Press Association
- WC = Walter Camp Football Foundation
- NYS = New York Sun
- PLAY = All-Players All-America team, selected by the Chicago Tribune with the cooperation of 112 major colleges, based on the votes of 2,193 college football players. Players were only permitted to vote for players who they played against.

== See also ==
- 1949 All-Big Seven Conference football team
- 1949 All-Big Ten Conference football team
- 1949 All-Pacific Coast Conference football team
- 1949 All-SEC football team
- 1949 All-Skyline Conference football team
- 1949 All-Southwest Conference football team
