= James Williams (end) =

American football player (1928–2015)

Rice Owls
- Position: End

Personal information
- Born: March 18, 1928; Waco, Texas, U.S.
- Died: June 23, 2015 (aged 87); Houston, Texas, U.S.

Career information
- High school: Waco (Waco, Texas)
- College: Rice University

Awards and highlights
- Consensus All-American (1949); 2× First-team All-SWC (1948, 1949); Second-team All-SWC (1947)

James "Froggy" Williams (March 18, 1928 – June 23, 2015) was an American college football player. He was elected to the College Football Hall of Fame in 1965. Williams was Rice's all-time leading scorer with 156 career points, including 75 extra points.

== Early life ==
Williams was born in Waco, Texas. He attended and played high school football at Waco High School. He starred on the 1945 co-championship team that tied with Highland Park, 7–7, in front of 45,790 fans at the Cotton Bowl.

== College career ==
Williams played as a left end and kicker at Rice University from 1946 to 1949 wearing jersey number 84. He stood 6-2 and weighed 197.

As a freshman, he played on the 9–2 team that defeated Tennessee 8–0 in the Orange Bowl.

As a senior in 1949, he was the captain and the most important player in head coach Jess Neely's "gridiron machine" team that won the Southwest Conference (SWC) championship. The Owls won nine of ten regular season games and defeated North Carolina and Hall of Fame back Charley "Choo Choo" Justice in the 1950 Cotton Bowl Classic, 27–13.

That same year Williams earned first-team All-America honors after leading the Owls to their first ten-win season in school history and the No. 5 final ranking in the AP Poll. The Owls went 6–0 in SWC play, registering wins over top 10 teams SMU and Texas.

Williams was a two-time All-Southwest Conference pick and Rice's all-time leading scorer. His 156 career points came on 13 touchdowns, 75 conversion kicks and a field goal. The only field goal he ever made as a collegian was to beat Texas, 17–15.

Williams was named one of the 1950 Cotton Bowl Classic's outstanding players and was selected to the Cotton Bowl's All-Decade team for the 1950s. He was inducted into the Texas Sports Hall of Fame in 1985.

== Personal life ==
Williams took a position with an oilfield service company driving service trucks to oil rig locations upon graduating from Rice. The company moved him into oilfield sales shortly after. He was in the oilfield service industry for 37 years. Williams founded an air conditioning service company in 1987. He was an active alumnus of Rice, as he continued to write and speak extensively about Rice football many years after his graduation.
