= Joe Watson (American football) =

American football player (1925–2006)

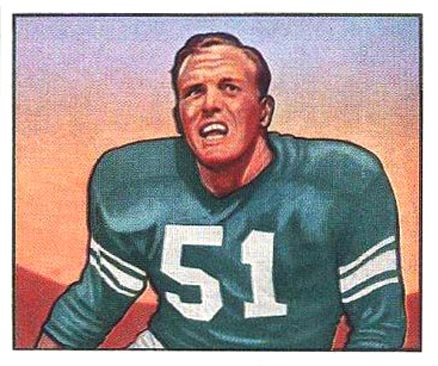
- Watson on a 1950 Bowman football card

No. 51
- Positions: Center, linebacker

Personal information
- Born: August 19, 1925; Sherman, Texas, U.S.
- Died: November 2, 2006 (aged 81); Houston, Texas, U.S.
- Listed height: 6 ft 3 in (1.91 m)
- Listed weight: 235 lb (107 kg)

Career information
- College: Rice (1946–1949)
- NFL draft: 1950: 1st round, 5th overall pick

Career history
- Detroit Lions (1950)

Awards and highlights
- First-team All-American (1949); 3× First-team All-SWC (1947–1949)

Career NFL statistics
- Games played: 8
- Games started: 7
- Interceptions: 1
- Fumble recoveries: 1
- Stats at Pro Football Reference

Joseph LaVernie Watson (August 19, 1925 – November 2, 2006) was an American professional football player who played one season with the Detroit Lions of the National Football League (NFL). He was selected by the Lions with the fifth overall pick of the 1950 NFL draft. He played college football at Rice University.

== Early life and college ==
Joseph LaVernie Watson was born on August 19, 1925, in Sherman, Texas. He was a four-year letterman for the Rice Owls of Rice University from 1946 to 1949. He earned Associated Press first-team All-Southwest Conference (SWC) honors in 1947, 1948, and 1949. He was also named first-team Al-SWC by the United Press (UP) in 1949. In 1949, Watson was named a first-team All-American by both the International News Service and Newspaper Editors Association, and a second-team All-American by both the UP and Football Writers Association of America.

== Professional career ==
Watson was selected by the Detroit Lions in the first round, with the fifth overall pick, of the 1950 NFL draft. He played in eight games, starting seven, for the Lions during the 1950 season, recording one interception and one fumble recovery. He was released in 1950.

== Personal life ==
Watson served in the United States Army Air Forces during World War II. He died on November 2, 2006, in Houston, Texas. Watson was 81 years old.
