= Thurman "Fum" McGraw =

American football player and administrator (1927–2000)

Fum McGraw
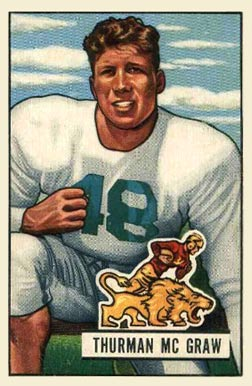
- McGraw on a 1951 Bowman football card

No. 73
- Position: Defensive tackle

Personal information
- Born: July 17, 1927; Garden City, Kansas, U.S.
- Died: September 13, 2000 (aged 73); Fort Collins, Colorado, U.S.
- Listed height: 6 ft 5 in (1.96 m)
- Listed weight: 235 lb (107 kg)

Career information
- High school: Paonia (Paonia, Colorado)
- College: Colorado A&M (1946–1949)
- NFL draft: 1950: 2nd round, 27th overall pick

Career history

Playing
- Detroit Lions (1950–1954)

Coaching
- Pittsburgh Steelers (1958–1961) Assistant coach

Awards and highlights
- 2× NFL champion (1952, 1953); First-team All-Pro (1952); Second-team All-Pro (1953); Pro Bowl (1950); First-team All-American (1949); Colorado State Rams No. 48 retired

Career NFL statistics
- Fumble recoveries: 10
- Interceptions: 2
- Interception yards: 6
- Stats at Pro Football Reference
- College Football Hall of Fame

Thurman "Fum" McGraw (July 17, 1927 – September 13, 2000) was an American football player and college athletics administrator. He played college football for the Colorado A&M Aggies—now known as the Colorado State Rams—and was inducted into the College Football Hall of Fame in 1981. He played for the Detroit Lions in the National Football League (NFL).

== Biography ==
McGraw was born in Garden City, Kansas. At Paonia High School, he won four letters in basketball, three each in football and baseball and was the Western Slope heavyweight-boxing champion. Standing 6'5" and weighing 235 lbs., McGraw was fresh from action with the U.S. Marine Corps in World War II when he enrolled at Colorado State University in 1946, when it was known as Colorado A&M. Working diligently at his game, McGraw called upon lessons learned as a boxer and wrestler to fashion himself into a special breed of football player. His arm strength was crushing to opposing players and his agility developed through wrestling served him well when fending off opposing linemen. Colorado A&M finished 2–7 in McGraw's freshman season, but things would change quickly. As a sophomore, McGraw helped his Rams post a 5–4–1 mark, the team's best record in 11 years. Then, in 1948, the Aggies posted upsets over rivals Utah State, Wyoming, BYU and archrival Colorado. The 1949 campaign, McGraw's last as a four-year letterman, saw the Aggies log a 9–1 record marred only by a loss to Wyoming. After graduation, McGraw joined the Detroit Lions and captured Rookie of the Year and All-Pro honors. In 1981, he was inducted into the College Football Hall of Fame.

While at Colorado State, McGraw was the school's first football All-American in 1949. When he returned to CSU in later years as a staff member, he also served as the athletic director from 1976 to 1986.

McGraw was also an All-American thrower for the Colorado State Rams track and field team, finishing 8th in the discus throw at the 1949 NCAA Track and Field Championships.
