= Dick Harris (center) =

American football center (1928–2003)

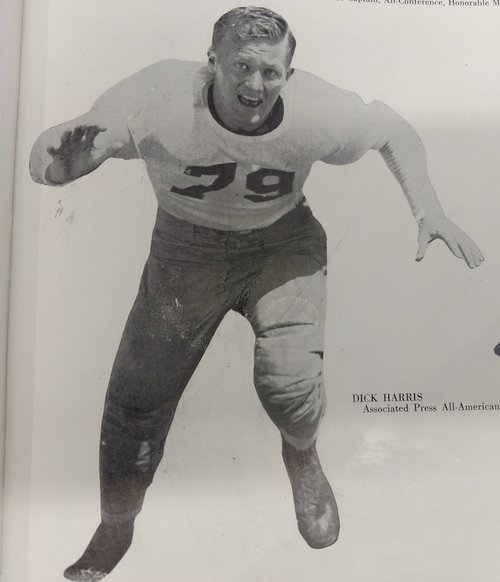
- Harris c. 1948

Profile
- Position: Center

Personal information
- Born: April 7, 1928; Wichita Falls, Texas, U.S.
- Died: May 10, 2003 (aged 75); Fort Worth, Texas, U.S.
- Listed height: 6 ft 2 in (1.88 m)
- Listed weight: 201 lb (91 kg)

Career information
- High school: Wichita Falls (TX)
- College: Texas (1945–1948)

Awards and highlights
- First-team All-American (1947); Second-team All-American (1948); Third-team All-American (1946); 4× First-team All-SWC (1945, 1946, 1947, 1948)

Richard Overton Harris Sr. (April 7, 1928 – May 10, 2003) was an American football player. A center, Harris attended Wichita Falls High School, where he was a first-team all-state selection. He played four years of college football for the Texas Longhorns. With the Longhorns, Harris was named first-team All-Southwest Conference (SWC) all four years and was a three-time All-American. He was selected in the NFL draft and AAFC draft four times, including twice as a first-round pick, but never played professionally.

== Early life ==
Harris was born on April 7, 1928, in Wichita Falls, Texas. He attended Wichita Falls High School and was a highly-decorated football player, being described by some sources as among the best in school history. He was a member of the varsity from 1942 to 1944 and was a starter in the last two years, including being a captain as a senior. He was named all-district twice and helped Wichita Falls win the district championship in 1944; Harris was also a first-team all-state selection that year and received a trophy from the Exchange Club of Wichita Falls for being voted the most outstanding player in the district. He participated at the 1945 Oil Bowl and at the Texas High School Football All-Star Game.

== College career ==
Considered a top football recruit, Harris enrolled at the University of Texas at Austin while studying petroleum engineering, and began playing for the Texas Longhorns in 1945. A two-way player, he won a starting role at center as a freshman in 1945 and was a consensus first-team All-Southwest Conference (SWC) selection and an honorable mention All-American. The Associated Press (AP), in selecting him All-SWC, noted that the "tall freshman ... never turned in a mediocre performance. Always he was the defensive star. He won the center job on the all-conference in a walk." He helped the Longhorns compile an overall record of 10–1 while winning the conference title, which included a win in the 1946 Cotton Bowl Classic.

Harris repeated as a consensus first-team All-SWC selection in 1946 while helping Texas go 8–2 with a national ranking of 15th at the end of the year. He was also named third-team All-American by the Newspaper Enterprise Association (NEA). In 1947, he moved to tackle and won his third consensus first-team All-SWC honor while being chosen first-team All-American by AP. At age 19, he was the youngest player on AP's All-American squad. He helped Texas finish fifth nationally with a 10–1 record that included a 1948 Sugar Bowl victory, receiving praise for his versatility, as Harris was able to perform well at all positions on the line and also excelled at several defensive positions.

As a senior in 1948, Harris returned to center, was named co-team captain with Tom Landry, his close friend, and helped the Longhorns compile a record of 7–3–1 with a victory in the 1949 Orange Bowl. The Austin American-Statesman described him as "probably the most valuable man in the Texas line" and noted that "on defense there is only one Dick Harris, only one man who can defend superbly against passes and runs, who can wreck interference and check ball carriers and roam behind the line with ... calculated abandon." He won his fourth-straight consensus first-team All-SWC selection, something only one other Longhorn ever accomplished (Bobby Layne), and was selected a second-team All-American by AP, the fourth time in his collegiate career he was named an All-American (either as an honorable mention, third-team, second-team or first-team choice). Harris was named the SWC Defensive MVP by the Houston Post for the 1948 season and was invited to the 1949 Chicago College All-Star Game. He ended his collegiate career as one of the best linemen in Texas history; coach Blair Cherry said that Harris would "likely go down in history as the Southwest Conference's greatest lineman."

== Professional career ==
On July 8, 1948, the All-America Football Conference (AAFC), a rival to the National Football League (NFL), held a secret draft of players who were seniors in the 1948 season; Harris was selected by the Baltimore Colts with the second overall pick. The Colts later traded his rights to the Cleveland Browns for Lu Gambino, and the Browns put him on their reserve list. Harris was also selected in the first round – with the 11th overall pick – of the 1949 NFL draft, by the Chicago Bears. He declined the offers so he could go into the oil business. Prior to the 1950 NFL draft, the Browns (since merged into the NFL, along with the Colts and San Francisco 49ers) removed him from their reserve list, and the Colts then used another draft pick on him – their eighth round choice (93rd overall). He was selected for the fourth time in the 1951 NFL draft – by the Detroit Lions with their 25th round selection (297th overall), but never played professionally.

== Personal life and honors ==
Harris went into the oil business after his collegiate career and later went into banking in 1960. He served 33 years as the president of several banks in Amarillo and Austin before retiring in 1993. He was married and had two sons. Harris died in Fort Worth at the age of 75, on May 10, 2003.

A poll by the Times Record News in 1949 named Harris the second-best center in Wichita Falls High School history, with him falling one vote behind the first-team selection. He was inducted into the University of Texas Hall of Honor in 1971. He was inducted into the Texas High School Football Hall of Fame in 1985 and into the Oil Bowl Hall of Fame in 1997.
