= 1954 NFL draft =

National Football League draft

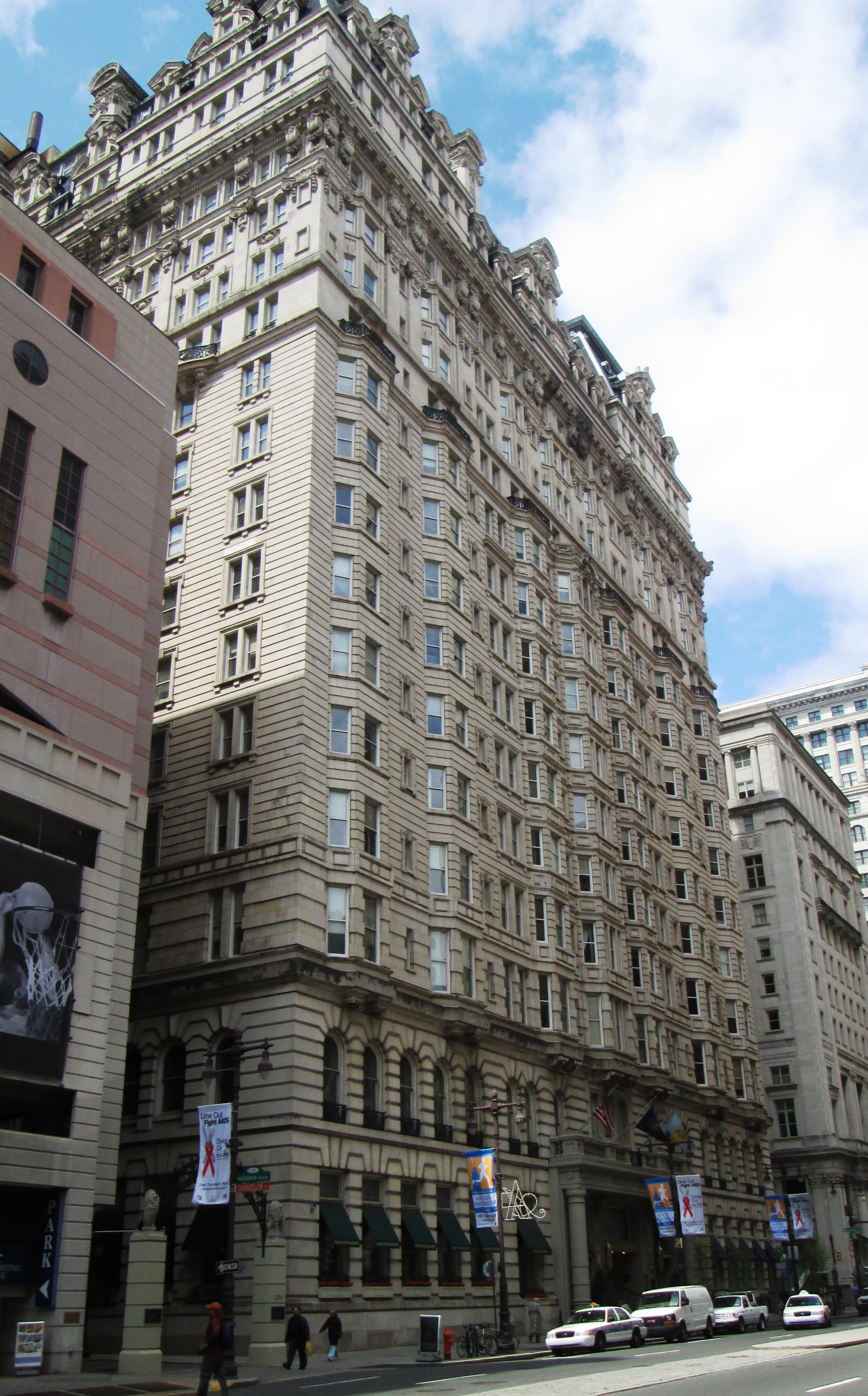
- The Bellevue–Stratford (location of the draft), photographed in 2013

General information
- Date: January 28, 1954
- Location: Bellevue-Stratford Hotel in Philadelphia, Pennsylvania

Overview
- 360 total selections in 30 rounds
- League: NFL
- First selection: Bobby Garrett, QB; Cleveland Browns
- Mr. Irrelevant: Ellis Horton, B Detroit Lions
- Most selections (35): Los Angeles Rams
- Fewest selections (27): Baltimore Colts
- Hall of Famers: 1: WR Raymond Berry

The 1954 NFL draft was held on January 28, 1954, at The Bellevue-Stratford Hotel in Philadelphia.

This was the eighth year that the first overall pick was a bonus pick determined by lottery. With the previous seven winners ineligible from the draw, only the Baltimore Colts, Chicago Cardinals, Cleveland Browns, Green Bay Packers, and Pittsburgh Steelers had an equal chance of winning. The draft lottery was won by Cleveland, who selected quarterback Bobby Garrett.

== Player selections ==
= Pro Bowler	= Hall of Famer

=== Round 1 ===
Pick #	NFL team	Player	Position	College
1	Cleveland Browns ^{(Lottery bonus pick)}	Bobby Garrett	Quarterback	Stanford
2	Chicago Cardinals	Lamar McHan	Quarterback	Arkansas
3	Green Bay Packers	Art Hunter	Tackle	Notre Dame
4	Green Bay Packers ^{(From the New York Giants)}	Veryl Switzer	Back	Kansas State
5	Baltimore Colts	Cotton Davidson	Quarterback	Baylor
6	Chicago Bears	Stan Wallace	Back	Illinois
7	Pittsburgh Steelers	Johnny Lattner	Halfback	Notre Dame
8	Washington Redskins	Steve Meilinger	End	Kentucky
9	Philadelphia Eagles	Neil Worden	Fullback	Notre Dame
10	Los Angeles Rams	Ed Beatty	Center	Ole Miss
11	San Francisco 49ers	Bernie Faloney	Back	Maryland
12	Cleveland Browns	John Bauer	Guard	Illinois
13	Detroit Lions	Dick Chapman	Tackle	Rice

=== Round 2 ===
Pick #	NFL team	Player	Position	College
14	Chicago Cardinals	Gary Knafelc	End	Colorado
15	Green Bay Packers	Bob Fleck	Tackle	Syracuse
16	Baltimore Colts	Larry Grigg	Back	Oklahoma
17	New York Giants	Ken Buck	End	Pacific
18	Chicago Bears	Rick Casares	Back	Florida
19	Pittsburgh Steelers	Pat Stark	Back	Syracuse
20	Washington Redskins	Jim Schrader	Center	Notre Dame
21	Philadelphia Eagles	Rocky Ryan	End	Illinois
22	Los Angeles Rams	Buddy Gillioz	Tackle	Houston
23	San Francisco 49ers	Leo Rucka	Center	Rice
24	Cleveland Browns	Chet Hanulak	Back	Maryland
25	Detroit Lions	Jim Neal	Center	Michigan State

=== Round 3 ===
Pick #	NFL team	Player	Position	College
26	Chicago Cardinals	Bobby Cavazos	Back	Texas Tech
27	Green Bay Packers	George Timberlake	Guard	USC
28	New York Giants	Clyde Bennett	End	South Carolina
29	Los Angeles Rams	Jim Kincaid	Back	South Carolina
30	Chicago Bears	Ed Meadows	Tackle	Duke
31	Pittsburgh Steelers	Tom Miner	End	Tulsa
32	Los Angeles Rams	Tom Nickoloff	End	USC
33	Philadelphia Eagles	Ted Connor	Tackle	Nebraska
34	Los Angeles Rams	Henry Hair	End	Georgia Tech
35	San Francisco 49ers	Steve Korcheck	Center	George Washington
36	Cleveland Browns	Mo Bassett	Back	Langston
37	Detroit Lions	Bill Bowman	Back	William & Mary

=== Round 4 ===
Pick #	NFL team	Player	Position	College
38	Chicago Cardinals	Bill Bredde	Back	Oklahoma A&M
39	Washington Redskins	Ralph Felton	Back	Maryland
40	Green Bay Packers	Tommy Allman	Back	West Virginia
41	New York Giants	Dick Nolan	Back	Maryland
42	Chicago Bears	Fran Paterra	Back	Notre Dame
43	Los Angeles Rams	Lester McClelland	Tackle	Syracuse
44	Detroit Lions	Bill Stits	Back	UCLA
45	Philadelphia Eagles	Minnie Mavraides	Guard	Notre Dame
46	Los Angeles Rams	Norm Nygaard	Back	San Diego State
47	San Francisco 49ers	Charlie Boxold	Back	Maryland
48	Cleveland Browns	Jerry Hilgenberg	Center	Iowa
49	Detroit Lions	Howard McCants	End	Washington State

=== Round 5 ===
Pick #	NFL team	Player	Position	College
50	Chicago Cardinals	Don Dohoney	End	Michigan State
51	Green Bay Packers	Max McGee	End	Tulane
52	New York Giants	Earl Putnam	Tackle	Arizona State
53	Baltimore Colts	Don Ellis	Back	Texas A&M
54	Chicago Bears	Bob Griffis	Guard	Furman
55	San Francisco 49ers	Bob Hantla	Guard	Kansas
56	Washington Redskins	Billy Wells	Back	Michigan State
57	Los Angeles Rams	Charlie Allen	Tackle	San Jose State
58	Los Angeles Rams	Art Hauser	Tackle	Xavier
59	San Francisco 49ers	Frank Mincevich	Guard	South Carolina
60	Cleveland Browns	Bill Lucky	Tackle	Baylor
61	Detroit Lions	George Parozzo	Tackle	William & Mary

=== Round 6 ===
Pick #	NFL team	Player	Position	College
62	Chicago Cardinals	Tom McHugh	Back	Notre Dame
63	Detroit Lions	Pence Dacus	Back	Southwest Texas State
64	Cleveland Browns	Jim Ray Smith	Guard	Baylor
65	New York Giants	George Jacoby	Tackle	Ohio State
66	Chicago Bears	John Hudson	Guard	Rice
67	Pittsburgh Steelers	Laurin Pepper	Back	Mississippi Southern
68	Washington Redskins	Bill McHenry	Center	Washington & Lee
69	Philadelphia Eagles	Hal Lambert	Tackle	TCU
70	Los Angeles Rams	Ken Panfil	Tackle	Purdue
71	San Francisco 49ers	Floyd Sagely	End	Arkansas
72	Cleveland Browns	Asa Jenkins	Back	Toledo
73	Detroit Lions	Dick Kercher	Back	Tulsa

=== Round 7 ===
Pick #	NFL team	Player	Position	College
74	Chicago Cardinals	Dave Mann	Back	Oregon State
75	Green Bay Packers	Sam Marshall	Tackle	Florida A&M
76	New York Giants	Wayne Berry	Back	Washington State
77	Baltimore Colts	Glenn Turner	Back	Georgia Tech
78	Chicago Bears	Ralph Cecere	Back	Villanova
79	Pittsburgh Steelers	Jack O'Brien	End	Florida
80	Washington Redskins	Harry Jagielski	Tackle	Indiana
81	Philadelphia Eagles	Jerry Norton	Back	SMU
82	Los Angeles Rams	Charley Weeks	Tackle	USC
83	San Francisco 49ers	Sid Youngelman	Tackle	Alabama
84	Cleveland Browns	Don Miller	Back	SMU
85	Detroit Lions	Jack Cross	Back	Utah

=== Round 8 ===
Pick #	NFL team	Player	Position	College
86	Chicago Cardinals	Paul Larson	Back	California
87	Green Bay Packers	Jimmie Williams	Tackle	Texas Tech
88	Baltimore Colts	Dennis McCotter	Guard	Detroit
89	New York Giants	Ralph Starkey	Tackle	West Virginia
90	Chicago Bears	Tom Garlington	Tackle	Arkansas
91	Pittsburgh Steelers	Paul Cameron	Back	UCLA
92	Washington Redskins	Bill Marker	End	West Virginia
93	Philadelphia Eagles	Dan Hunter	Tackle	Florida
94	Los Angeles Rams	George Black	End	Washington
95	Cleveland Browns	Bill Barbish	Back	Tennessee
96	Cleveland Browns	Charlie Harris	Back	Georgia
97	Detroit Lions	Milt Davis	Back	UCLA

=== Round 9 ===
Pick #	NFL team	Player	Position	College
98	Chicago Cardinals	Dean Chambers	Tackle	Washington
99	Green Bay Packers	Dave Davis	End	Georgia Tech
100	New York Giants	Pete O'Garra	End	UCLA
101	Baltimore Colts	Bob Adams	Guard	Shippensburg
102	Chicago Bears	Paul Giel	Halfback	Minnesota
103	Pittsburgh Steelers	Joe Zombek	End	Pittsburgh
104	Washington Redskins	Jerry Minnick	Tackle	Nebraska
105	Philadelphia Eagles	Phil Branch	Guard	Texas
106	Los Angeles Rams	Alex Bravo	Back	Cal Poly
107	San Francisco 49ers	Ted Connolly	Guard	Tulsa
108	Cleveland Browns	Tom Jones	Tackle	Miami (OH)
109	Detroit Lions	Bob Lawson	Back	Cal Poly

=== Round 10 ===
Pick #	NFL team	Player	Position	College
110	Chicago Cardinals	Tommy Lewis	Back	Alabama
111	Green Bay Packers	Gene Knutson	End	Michigan
112	Baltimore Colts	Bob Schoonmaker	Back	Missouri
113	New York Giants	John Steinberg	End	Stanford
114	Chicago Bears	D. C. Andrews	End	Hardin–Simmons
115	Pittsburgh Steelers	Bob Fisher	Tackle	Tennessee
116	Washington Redskins	Merrill Green	Back	Oklahoma
117	Los Angeles Rams	Ed Hughes	Back	Tulsa
118	Los Angeles Rams	Joe Katchik	End	Notre Dame
119	Cleveland Browns	Don Goss	Guard	SMU
120	Cleveland Browns	Tom Pagna	Back	Miami (OH)
121	Detroit Lions	Jack Carroll	End	Holy Cross

=== Round 11 ===
Pick #	NFL team	Player	Position	College
122	Chicago Cardinals	Homer Smith	Back	Princeton
123	Green Bay Packers	Ken Hall	End	North Texas State
124	New York Giants	Tom Fitzpatrick	Guard	Villanova
125	Baltimore Colts	Bob Leberman	Back	Syracuse
126	Chicago Bears	Ron Wallin	Back	Minnesota
127	Pittsburgh Steelers	Lou Cimarolli	Back	Pittsburgh
128	Washington Redskins	Gene Wilson	Back	South Carolina
129	Philadelphia Eagles	Dave McLaughlin	End	Dartmouth
130	Los Angeles Rams	Duane Wardlow	Tackle	Washington
131	San Francisco 49ers	John Skocko	End	USC
132	Cleveland Browns	Max Schuebel	Tackle	Rice
133	Detroit Lions	Milt Schwenk	Tackle	Washington State

=== Round 12 ===
Pick #	NFL team	Player	Position	College
134	Chicago Cardinals	Howard Pitt	End	Duke
135	Green Bay Packers	Bill Oliver	Back	Alabama
136	Baltimore Colts	Don Chelf	Tackle	Iowa
137	New York Giants	Wendell Gulseth	Tackle	Wisconsin
138	Chicago Bears	Joe Faragalli	Guard	Villanova
139	Pittsburgh Steelers	Don Fritz	End	Cincinnati
140	Washington Redskins	Ben Dunkerley	Tackle	West Virginia
141	Philadelphia Eagles	Dick Clasby	Back	Harvard
142	Los Angeles Rams	Jack Maultsby	Tackle	North Carolina
143	San Francisco 49ers	Hal Easterwood	Center	Mississippi State
144	Cleveland Browns	Tom Bruenich	Tackle	Maryland
145	Detroit Lions	Bob Hartman	Tackle	Oregon State

=== Round 13 ===
Pick #	NFL team	Player	Position	College
146	Chicago Cardinals	Les Goble	Back	Alfred
147	Green Bay Packers	Mike Takacs	Guard	Ohio State
148	New York Giants	Bob Topp	End	Michigan
149	Baltimore Colts	Chuck McMillan	Back	John Carroll
150	Chicago Bears	Julius Seaholm	Guard	Texas
151	Pittsburgh Steelers	Charles Lattimer	Center	Maryland
152	Washington Redskins	Roger Dornburg	Back	Wisconsin
153	Philadelphia Eagles	Joe Mehalick	Tackle	Virginia
154	Los Angeles Rams	Sam Hensley	End	Georgia Tech
155	San Francisco 49ers	Morgan Williams	Guard	TCU
156	Cleveland Browns	George Cummins	Tackle	Tulane
157	Detroit Lions	Jim Swierczek	Back	Marshall

=== Round 14 ===
Pick #	NFL team	Player	Position	College
158	Chicago Cardinals	Sammy Dumas	Guard	Arkansas
159	Green Bay Packers	Kosse Johnson	Back	Rice
160	Baltimore Colts	Ordell Braase	Tackle	South Dakota
161	New York Giants	Bobby Epps	Back	Pittsburgh
162	Chicago Bears	Ken Miller	Back	Illinois
163	Pittsburgh Steelers	Roger Bradford	End	Waynesburg
164	Washington Redskins	Roger Nelson	Tackle	Oklahoma
165	Philadelphia Eagles	Hal Patterson	Back	Kansas
166	Los Angeles Rams	Mitchell Johnson	Back	Bishop
167	San Francisco 49ers	Sammy Williams	Back	California
168	Cleveland Browns	Jim Head	Back	Iowa
169	Detroit Lions	Ray Novak	Back	Nebraska

=== Round 15 ===
Pick #	NFL team	Player	Position	College
170	Chicago Cardinals	Cecil Harp	End	Pacific
171	San Francisco 49ers	Ed Gossage	Tackle	Georgia Tech
172	New York Giants	Jim Swan	Guard	Denver
173	Baltimore Colts	Joe D'Agostino	Guard	Florida
174	Chicago Bears	Harlon Hill	End	Florence State
175	Pittsburgh Steelers	Tom Drake	Guard	Chattanooga
176	Washington Redskins	Hugh Merck	Tackle	South Carolina
177	Philadelphia Eagles	Ray McKown	Back	TCU
178	Los Angeles Rams	Ed Elliot	Back	Richmond
179	San Francisco 49ers	Sam Palumbo	Guard	Notre Dame
180	Cleveland Browns	Chet Lyssy	Back	Hardin–Simmons
181	Detroit Lions	Kirk Hinderlider	End	Colorado A&M

=== Round 16 ===
Pick #	NFL team	Player	Position	College
182	Chicago Cardinals	Al Kilgore	Tackle	Kent State
183	Green Bay Packers	Des Koch	Back	USC
184	Baltimore Colts	Alex Sandusky	End	Clarion
185	New York Giants	George Rice	Back	Iowa
186	Chicago Bears	Earl Lindley	Back	Utah State
187	Pittsburgh Steelers	Cas Krol	Tackle	Detroit
188	Washington Redskins	Gilmer Spring	End	Texas
189	Philadelphia Eagles	Charlie Grant	Center	Utah
190	Los Angeles Rams	Roger Frey	Tackle	Georgia Tech
191	San Francisco 49ers	Bobby Fiveash	Back	Florida State
192	Cleveland Browns	Rich Raidel	Guard	Kent State
193	Detroit Lions	Bob Chuoke	Tackle	Houston

=== Round 17 ===
Pick #	NFL team	Player	Position	College
194	Chicago Cardinals	Jack Troxell	Back	Arkansas
195	Green Bay Packers	J. D. Roberts	Guard	Oklahoma
196	New York Giants	Jackie Parker	Back	Mississippi State
197	Baltimore Colts	Tommy Adkins	Center	Kentucky
198	Chicago Bears	Lou Woodard	Center	Sam Houston State
199	Pittsburgh Steelers	Joe Fulwyler	Center	Oregon State
200	Washington Redskins	Jerry Coody	Back	Baylor
201	Philadelphia Eagles	Bob Knowles	Tackle	Baylor
202	Los Angeles Rams	Ed Wilhelm	Center	Houston
203	San Francisco 49ers	Carl Kautz	Tackle	Texas Tech
204	Cleveland Browns	Howard Chapman	Tackle	Florida
205	Detroit Lions	Rick Kaser	Back	Toledo

=== Round 18 ===
Pick #	NFL team	Player	Position	College
206	Chicago Cardinals	Dick Young	Back	Chattanooga
207	Green Bay Packers	Emery Barnes	End	Oregon
208	Baltimore Colts	Dick Shinaut	Back	Texas Western
209	New York Giants	Crawford Mims	Guard	Ole Miss
210	Chicago Bears	McNeil Moore	Back	Sam Houston State
211	Pittsburgh Steelers	Don Penza	End	Notre Dame
212	Washington Redskins	Walt Cudzik	Center	Purdue
213	Philadelphia Eagles	Sam Mrvos	Guard	Georgia
214	Los Angeles Rams	Stan Sheriff	Center	Cal Poly
215	San Francisco 49ers	Morris Kay	End	Kansas
216	Cleveland Browns	Bill Wohrman	Back	South Carolina
217	Detroit Lions	Norm Hayes	Tackle	College of Idaho

=== Round 19 ===
Pick #	NFL team	Player	Position	College
218	Chicago Cardinals	Jerry Sazio	Tackle	William & Mary
219	Green Bay Packers	Ken Hall	Center	Springfield
220	New York Giants	Bob King	Guard	South Carolina
221	Baltimore Colts	Charley Wenzlau	End	Miami (OH)
222	Chicago Bears	Jim Lum	Tackle	Louisiana Tech
223	Pittsburgh Steelers	Don Rydalch	Back	Utah
224	Washington Redskins	Jerry Witt	Back	Wisconsin
225	Philadelphia Eagles	Jerry Clem	Guard	SMU
226	Los Angeles Rams	Frank Givens	Tackle	Georgia Tech
227	San Francisco 49ers	Bob Edmiston	Tackle	Temple
228	Cleveland Browns	John Taylor	Center	Austin
229	Detroit Lions	Buster Graves	Tackle	Arkansas

=== Round 20 ===
Pick #	NFL team	Player	Position	College
230	Chicago Cardinals	Stan Huntsman	Back	Wabash
231	Green Bay Packers	Lowell Herbert	Guard	Pacific
232	Baltimore Colts	Raymond Berry	Split end	SMU
233	New York Giants	Gene Snipes	End	Austin
234	Chicago Bears	Jim Ladd	End	Bowling Green
235	Pittsburgh Steelers	Fred Prender	Back	West Chester
236	Washington Redskins	Sam Morley	End	Stanford
237	Philadelphia Eagles	Tommy Bailes	Back	Houston
238	Los Angeles Rams	Bob Dougherty	Back	Cincinnati
239	San Francisco 49ers	Frank DePietro	Back	Georgia
240	Cleveland Browns	Hugh Pierce	Center	NC State
241	Detroit Lions	Jim Durrant	Guard	Utah

=== Round 21 ===
Pick #	NFL team	Player	Position	College
242	Chicago Cardinals	Jim Stander	Tackle	Colorado
243	Green Bay Packers	Art Liebscher	Back	Pacific
244	New York Giants	Rex Corless	Back	Michigan State
245	Baltimore Colts	Bob Lade	Guard	Peru State
246	Chicago Bears	Sonny Cleere	Tackle	Abilene Christian
247	Pittsburgh Steelers	Dan Tassotti	Tackle	Miami (FL)
248	Washington Redskins	John Cavaglieri	Tackle	North Texas State
249	Philadelphia Eagles	Johnny Crouch	End	TCU
250	Los Angeles Rams	Jerry Cooper	Tackle	West Virginia
251	San Francisco 49ers	Howard Alsup	Tackle	Middle Tennessee
252	Cleveland Browns	Jim Baughman	Guard	Illinois
253	Detroit Lions	Jack Kistler	Back	Duke

=== Round 22 ===
Pick #	NFL team	Player	Position	College
254	Chicago Cardinals	Ledio Fanucchi	Tackle	Fresno State
255	Green Bay Packers	Willie Buford	Tackle	Morgan State
256	Baltimore Colts	Bob Meyer	Tackle	Ohio State
257	New York Giants	Joe Collier	End	Northwestern
258	Chicago Bears	Charlie Sumner	Back	William & Mary
259	Pittsburgh Steelers	John Lapsley	Guard	Northeastern
260	Washington Redskins	Max Schmaling	Back	Purdue
261	Philadelphia Eagles	Jim Wojciehowski	End	Purdue
262	Los Angeles Rams	Ray Pacer	Tackle	Purdue
263	San Francisco 49ers	Ralph Reynolds	Back	North Texas State
264	Cleveland Browns	Lloyd Caudle	Back	Duke
265	Detroit Lions	Dewey Brundage	End	BYU

=== Round 23 ===
Pick #	NFL team	Player	Position	College
266	Chicago Cardinals	Charley Oakley	Back	LSU
267	Green Bay Packers	Clint Sathrum	Back	St. Olaf
268	New York Giants	Pete Mangum	Back	Ole Miss
269	Baltimore Colts	Leon Hardeman	Back	Georgia Tech
270	Chicago Bears	Herm Lee	Tackle	Florida A&M
271	Pittsburgh Steelers	Joe Pascarella	Tackle	Penn State
272	Washington Redskins	Pete Carrieri	Guard	Villanova
273	Philadelphia Eagles	Harold Lofton	Back	Ole Miss
274	Los Angeles Rams	Don Marks	Back	California
275	San Francisco 49ers	LeRoy Fenstemaker	Back	Rice
276	Cleveland Browns	Bob Mischak	End	Army
277	Detroit Lions	Jack Shanafelt	Tackle	Penn

=== Round 24 ===
Pick #	NFL team	Player	Position	College
278	Chicago Cardinals	Lou Sawchik	End	Ohio
279	Green Bay Packers	Marv Tennefoss	End	Stanford
280	Baltimore Colts	Don Kerlin	Back	Concordia (Moorhead)
281	New York Giants	Bill Harris	Tackle	LSU
282	Chicago Bears	Bill Jarrett	Back	West Virginia
283	Pittsburgh Steelers	Jack Flanagan	End	Detroit
284	Washington Redskins	Will Renfro	End	Memphis State
285	Philadelphia Eagles	Nate Gressette	Tackle	Clemson
286	Los Angeles Rams	Ed Brookman	Tackle	West Virginia
287	San Francisco 49ers	Jerry Daniels	Tackle	Tennessee Tech
288	Cleveland Browns	Johnny Gramling	Back	South Carolina
289	Detroit Lions	Bobby Burrows	Guard	Duke

=== Round 25 ===
Pick #	NFL team	Player	Position	College
290	Chicago Cardinals	Jerry Marchand	Back	LSU
291	Green Bay Packers	John Smalley	Tackle	Alabama
292	New York Giants	Bill Baker	Back	Washburn
293	Baltimore Colts	Pepper Rodgers	Back	Georgia Tech
294	Chicago Bears	Tom Feamster	End	Florida State
295	Pittsburgh Steelers	Jim Barron	Tackle	Mississippi State
296	Washington Redskins	George Rosso	Back	Ohio State
297	Philadelphia Eagles	Ray Zambiasi	Back	Detroit
298	Los Angeles Rams	Dick Miller	Back	Baldwin Wallace
299	San Francisco 49ers	John Platt	Back	Elon
300	Cleveland Browns	Tom Hughes	Tackle	VPI
301	Detroit Lions	Richie Woit	Back	Arkansas State

=== Round 26 ===
Pick #	NFL team	Player	Position	College
302	Chicago Cardinals	Ralph Carrigan	Center	Alabama
303	Green Bay Packers	Ralph Baierl	Tackle	Maryland
304	Baltimore Colts	Jesus Esparza	Tackle	New Mexico A&M
305	New York Giants	George Van Zandt	Back	Long Beach State
306	Chicago Bears	Lou Petroka	Back	Boston University
307	Pittsburgh Steelers	Joe Varaitis	Back	Penn
308	Washington Redskins	Dorsey Gibson	Back	Oklahoma A&M
309	Philadelphia Eagles	Charley Smith	Back	Baylor
310	Los Angeles Rams	Glenn Holtzman	Tackle	North Texas State
311	San Francisco 49ers	Pete Bello	Center	Pasadena CC
312	Cleveland Browns	Joe Lundy	Guard	Kansas
313	Detroit Lions	Jim George	Tackle	Syracuse

=== Round 27 ===
Pick #	NFL team	Player	Position	College
314	Chicago Cardinals	John Culver	Back	Harvard
315	Green Bay Packers	Hosea Sims	End	Marquette
316	New York Giants	Bobby Clatterbuck	Back	Houston
317	Baltimore Colts	Bill Sennett	End	Georgia Tech
318	Chicago Bears	Dick Oniskey	Center	Chattanooga
319	Pittsburgh Steelers	Tom Yewcic	Quarterback	Michigan State
320	Washington Redskins	Ken Yarborough	End	North Carolina
321	Philadelphia Eagles	Ben Addiego	Back	Villanova
322	Los Angeles Rams	Entee Shine	End	Notre Dame
323	San Francisco 49ers	Gayford Baker	Guard	Nebraska–Omaha
324	Cleveland Browns	Johnny Mapp	Back	VMI
325	Detroit Lions	Dick Rzeszut	Center	Benedictine

=== Round 28 ===
Pick #	NFL team	Player	Position	College
326	Chicago Cardinals	Tom Koller	Back	William & Mary
327	Green Bay Packers	Evan Slonac	Back	Michigan State
328	Baltimore Colts	Ray Ecstrom	Center	Westminster (PA)
329	New York Giants	Jim Partridge	Back	Tulane
330	Chicago Bears	P. W. Underwood	Guard	Mississippi State
331	Pittsburgh Steelers	Joe Bush	Guard	Notre Dame
332	Washington Redskins	Ron Hansen	Tackle	Minnesota
333	Philadelphia Eagles	John Gerdes	Tackle	Cornell
334	Los Angeles Rams	Dick Mann	Back	Western Reserve
335	San Francisco 49ers	Bob Garbrecht	Back	Rice
336	Cleveland Browns	Vince Vergara	Back	Army
337	Detroit Lions	Dolph Rutschman	Back	Linfield

=== Round 29 ===
Pick #	NFL team	Player	Position	College
338	Chicago Cardinals	Bill Albrecht	Back	Washington
339	Green Bay Packers	Jerry Dufek	Tackle	St. Norbert
340	New York Giants	Bill Mote	Tackle	Florida State
341	Baltimore Colts	Claude Taliaferro	Back	Illinois
342	Chicago Bears	Alvin Beale	Back	Trinity (TX)
343	Pittsburgh Steelers	Joe Fagan	Tackle	John Carroll
344	Washington Redskins	Ted Kress	Back	Michigan
345	Philadelphia Eagles	Jack Stone	Back	West Virginia
346	Los Angeles Rams	Dick Deitrick	End	Pittsburgh
347	San Francisco 49ers	Ted Dunn	Back	Murray State
348	Cleveland Browns	Troy Carter	Back	VMI
349	Detroit Lions	Mel Bertrand	Center	Idaho

=== Round 30 ===
Pick #	NFL team	Player	Position	College
350	Chicago Cardinals	Alex Burl	Back	Colorado A&M
351	Green Bay Packers	Terry Campbell	Back	Washington State
352	Baltimore Colts	Pat Abbruzzi	Back	Rhode Island
353	New York Giants	Jim Gibson	Tackle	USC
354	Chicago Bears	Jim Haluska	Back	Wisconsin
355	Pittsburgh Steelers	Juel Sweatte	Back	Oklahoma
356	Washington Redskins	Don Rondou	Back	Northwestern
357	Philadelphia Eagles	Tommy Woodlee	Back	South Carolina
358	Los Angeles Rams	Frank Metzke	Tackle	Marquette
359	San Francisco 49ers	Don Folks	End	Houston
360	Detroit Lions	Ellis Horton	Back	Eureka

= Pro Bowler	= Hall of Famer

== Hall of Famers ==
- Raymond Berry, wide receiver from Southern Methodist University taken 20th round 232nd overall by the Baltimore Colts.

Inducted: Professional Football Hall of Fame class of 1973.

== Notable undrafted players ==
^{†}	= Pro Bowler

Original NFL team	Player	Pos.	College	Notes
Baltimore Colts	Royce Womble	HB	North Texas State	
Cleveland Browns	Cookie Gilchrist ^{†}	FB		
Cleveland Browns	Don King	DT	Kentucky	
Green Bay Packers	Gene White	CB	Georgia	
Los Angeles Rams	Ernie Warlick ^{†}	TE	North Carolina Central	
New York Giants	Cliff Livingston	LB	UCLA	
New York Giants	Ken MacAfee	TE	Alabama	
Washington Redskins	Joe Scudero ^{†}	S	San Francisco	
