= Bob Fleck =

American football player (1932–2017)

Profile
- Position: Tackle

Personal information
- Born: January 12, 1932
- Died: September 27, 2017 (aged 85)

Career information
- High school: S. Horace Scott High School; Manlius Prep
- College: Syracuse
- NFL draft: 1954: 2nd round, 15th overall pick

Awards and highlights
- 2× All-Eastern (1952, 1953)

Robert R. “Bob” Fleck (January 12, 1932 – September 27, 2017) was a two time All-American football tackle at Syracuse. He was the drafted by the Green Bay Packers in the 1954 NFL draft but never played professional football.

Fleck grew up in Coatesville, Pennsylvania, graduating from S. Horace Scott High School in 1949, where he was a two sport athlete. He then attended Manlius Prep before going to Syracuse. He was selected as an All-American football player in 1952 and 1953.

In 1954, Fleck was drafted 15th overall by the Packers in the second round of the NFL draft and signed with them that spring but then tried to go play for the Ottawa Roughriders in the Canadian Football League. After Green Bay used a court injunction to keep him in the NFL, he was drafted into the Army. So the Packers traded him, along with quarterback Babe Parilli – also bound for the service – to Cleveland for quarterback Bob Garrett, halfback Don Miller, guard John Bauer and tackle Chet Gierula. Fleck served in the Army from 1954 to 1962, then tried out in Canada, but never played pro football.

He worked at Lukens Steel Company until his retirement in 1992.

In 2000, Fleck was named to Syracuse's All-Century Team.
