= List of Cleveland Browns first-round draft picks =

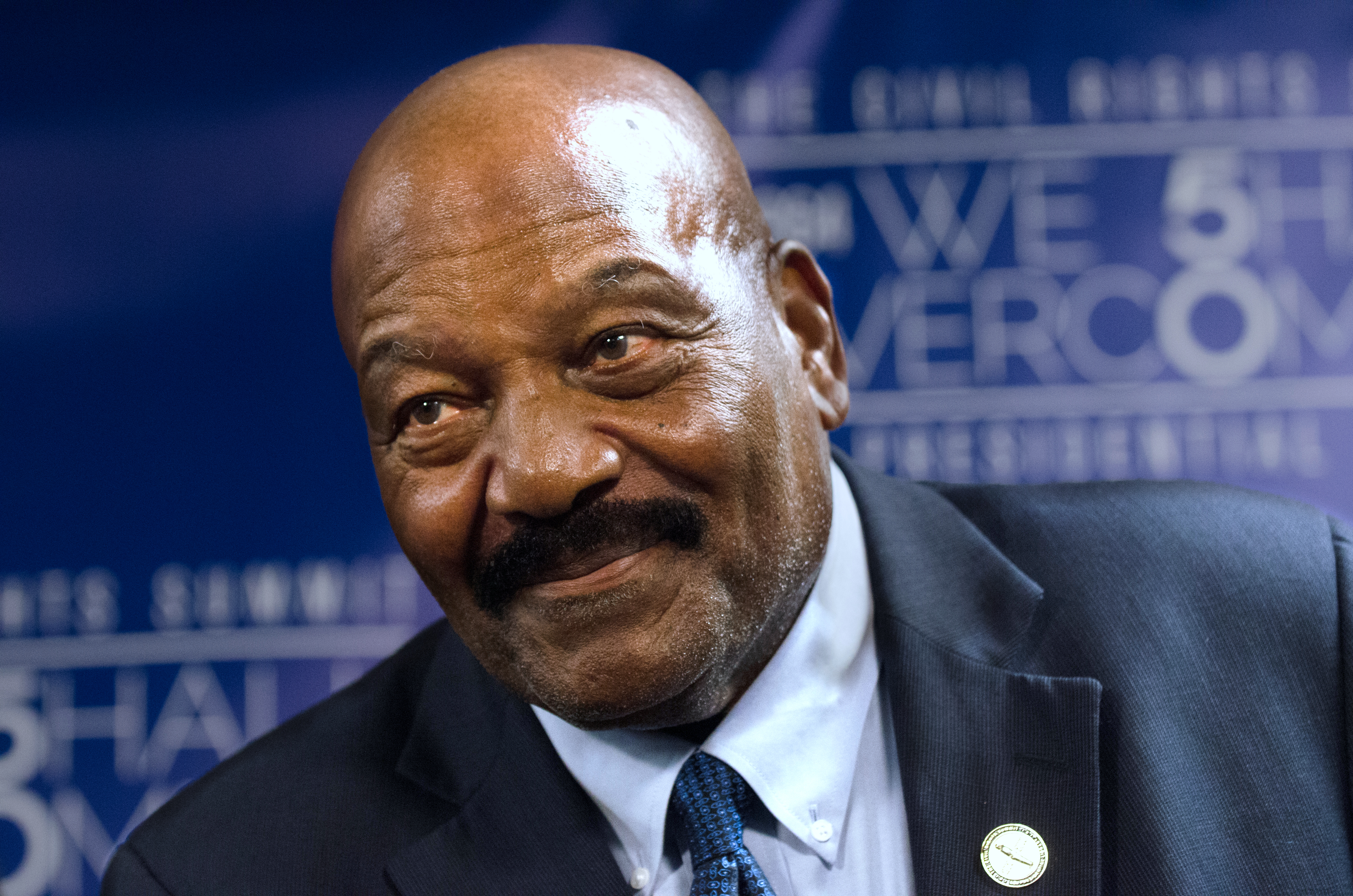
Hall of Famer Jim Brown was the Browns' first-round draft pick in 1957

The Cleveland Browns joined the National Football League (NFL) in 1950 with the Baltimore Colts and San Francisco 49ers after having spent four seasons with the All-America Football Conference. The Browns' first selection as an NFL team was Ken Carpenter, a wide receiver from Oregon State. The team's most recent first round selections were Utah offensive tackle Spencer Fano and Texas A&M wide receiver KC Concepcion.

Every year during April, each NFL franchise seeks to add new players to its roster through a collegiate draft known as "the NFL Annual Player Selection Meeting", which is more commonly known as the NFL draft. Teams are ranked in inverse order based on the previous season's record, with teams missing the playoffs picking first, and then playoff teams in the inverse order of elimination. Teams have the option of trading away their picks to other teams for different picks, players, cash, or a combination thereof. Thus, it is not uncommon for a team's actual draft pick to differ from their assigned draft pick, or for a team to have extra or no draft picks in any round due to these trades.

The Browns did not have any draft choices from 1996 to 1998, because then-owner Art Modell took all the team's players to Baltimore, Maryland, effectively stopping the franchise. However, the NFL mandated that the Browns' name, colors, and franchise history remain in Cleveland and that the team would reactivate by 1999. In 1999, the Browns selected number one overall, drafting University of Kentucky quarterback Tim Couch.

The Browns have selected number one overall five times: Bobby Garrett (1954), Tim Couch (1999), Courtney Brown (2000), Myles Garrett (2017) and Baker Mayfield (2018). The team has also selected number two overall only once and number three overall six times. The Browns have selected players from the University of Michigan five times, Ohio State University and the University of Southern California four times, and the University of Florida three times. Five eventual Hall of Famers were selected by the Browns: Doug Atkins, Jim Brown, Paul Warfield, Ozzie Newsome and Joe Thomas.

== Player selections ==
Selected number one overall *	Enshrined in the Pro Football Hall of Fame †

All-America Football Conference (1947–1949)
Year	Pick	Player name	Position	College	Notes
1947	8	Bob Chappuis	B	Michigan	
1948	8	Jeff Durkota	B	Penn State	
1949	SD 8	Gene Derricotte	B	Michigan	
1949	8	Jack Mitchell	QB	Oklahoma	

National Football League, Early Era (1950–1969)
Year	Pick	Player name	Position	College	Notes
1950	13	Ken Carpenter	RB	Oregon State	
1951	14	Kenny Konz	DB	LSU	
1952	10	Bert Rechichar	DB/K	Tennessee	
1952	12	Harry Agganis	QB	Boston	
1953	11	Doug Atkins †	DE	Tennessee	
1954	1	Bobby Garrett *	QB	Stanford	
1954	12	John Bauer	OG/OT	Illinois	
1955	13	Kurt Burris	C	Oklahoma	
1956	13	Preston Carpenter	E/RB/TE	Arkansas	
1957	6	Jim Brown †	FB	Syracuse	
1958	13	Jim Shofner	DB	TCU	
1959	11	Rich Kreitling	WR	Illinois	
1960	8	Jim Houston	DE/LB	Ohio State	
1961	10	Bobby Crespino	TE	Mississippi	
1962	4	Gary Collins	WR/P	Maryland	
1962	11	Leroy Jackson	RB	Western Illinois	
1963	9	Tom Hutchinson	WR	Kentucky	
1964	11	Paul Warfield †	WR	Ohio State	
1965	13th pick traded to San Francisco, used to select George Donnelly				
1966	14	Milt Morin	TE	Massachusetts	
1967	18	Bob Matheson	LB	Duke	
1968	21	Marv Upshaw	DL	Trinity	
1969	20	Ron Johnson	RB	Michigan	

National Football League, Modern Era (1970–present)
Year	Pick	Player name	Position	College	Notes
1970	3	Mike Phipps	QB	Purdue	
1970	21	Bob McKay	OT	Texas	
1971	14	Clarence Scott	DB	Kansas	
1972	18	Thom Darden	DB	Michigan	
1973	16	Steve Holden	WR	Arizona State	
1973	22	Pete Adams	OG	USC	
1974	15th pick traded to San Diego, used to select Don Goode				
1975	5	Mack Mitchell	DL	Houston	
1976	7	Mike Pruitt	FB	Purdue	
1977	17	Robert Jackson	LB	Texas A&M	
1978	12	Clay Matthews	LB	USC	
1978	23	Ozzie Newsome †	TE	Alabama	
1979	20	Willis Adams	WR	Houston	
1980	27	Charles White	RB	USC	
1981	22	Hanford Dixon	CB	Southern Miss	
1982	3	Chip Banks	LB	USC	
1983	14th pick traded to Buffalo, used to select Jim Kelly				
1984	18	Don Rogers	S	UCLA	
1985	7th pick traded to Green Bay via Buffalo, used to select Ken Ruettgers				
1986	20th pick traded to Buffalo, used to select Will Wolford				
1987	5	Mike Junkin	LB	Duke	
1988	21	Clifford Charlton	LB	Florida	
1989	13	Eric Metcalf	RB/WR	Texas	
1990	18th pick traded to Green Bay, used to select Tony Bennett				
1991	2	Eric Turner	DB	UCLA	
1992	9	Tommy Vardell	FB	Stanford	
1993	14	Steve Everitt	C	Michigan	
1994	9	Antonio Langham	CB	Alabama	
1994	29	Derrick Alexander	WR	Michigan	
1995	30	Craig Powell	LB	Ohio State	
1996	Franchise deactivated; no team in Cleveland from 1996 to 1998				
1997	Franchise deactivated; no team in Cleveland from 1996 to 1998				
1998	Franchise deactivated; no team in Cleveland from 1996 to 1998				
1999	1	Tim Couch *	QB	Kentucky	
2000	1	Courtney Brown *	DE	Penn State	
2001	3	Gerard Warren	DT	Florida	
2002	16	William Green	RB	Boston College	
2003	21	Jeff Faine	C	Notre Dame	
2004	6	Kellen Winslow II	TE	Miami	
2005	3	Braylon Edwards	WR	Michigan	
2006	13	Kamerion Wimbley	LB	Florida State	
2007	3	Joe Thomas †	OT	Wisconsin	
2007	22	Brady Quinn	QB	Notre Dame	
2008	22nd pick traded to Dallas, used to select Felix Jones				
2009	21	Alex Mack	C	California	
2010	7	Joe Haden	CB	Florida	
2011	21	Phil Taylor	DT	Baylor	
2012	3	Trent Richardson	RB	Alabama	
2012	22	Brandon Weeden	QB	Oklahoma State	
2013	6	Barkevious Mingo	OLB	LSU	
2014	8	Justin Gilbert	CB	Oklahoma State	
2014	22	Johnny Manziel	QB	Texas A&M	
2015	12	Danny Shelton	DT	Washington	
2015	19	Cameron Erving	C	Florida State	
2016	15	Corey Coleman	WR	Baylor	
2017	1	Myles Garrett *	DE	Texas A&M	
2017	25	Jabrill Peppers	S	Michigan	
2017	29	David Njoku	TE	Miami	
2018	1	Baker Mayfield *	QB	Oklahoma	
2018	4	Denzel Ward	CB	Ohio State	
2019	17th pick traded to NY Giants, used to select Dexter Lawrence				
2020	10	Jedrick Wills	OT	Alabama	
2021	26	Greg Newsome II	CB	Northwestern	
2022	13th pick traded to Philadelphia via Houston, used to select Jordan Davis				
2023	12th pick traded to Detroit via Houston and Arizona, used to select Jahmyr Gibbs				
2024	23rd pick traded to Jacksonville via Houston and Minnesota, used to select Brian Thomas Jr.				
2025	5	Mason Graham	DT	Michigan	
2026	9	Spencer Fano	OT	Utah	
2026	24	KC Concepcion	WR	Texas A&M	
