= Chester Gierula =

American football player (1928–1990)

Profile
- Position: Guard

Personal information
- Born: April 29, 1928; Allentown, Pennsylvania, U.S.
- Died: May 6, 1990 (aged 62); Brookeville, Maryland, U.S.

Career information
- College: Maryland
- NFL draft: 1951: 10th round

Career history
- Cleveland Browns (1951–1953); Green Bay Packers (1954–?)

Chester F. Gierula (April 29, 1928 – May 6, 1990) was an American football player. He was selected in the tenth round of the 1951 NFL draft.

Gierula was born in Allentown, Pennsylvania and attended William Allen High School.

Gierula attended college at the University of Maryland, where he played football as a guard. He played on the offensive line alongside Maryland football greats Bob Ward and Dick Modzelewski. Gierula was said to have played "his best game of the year" in the 1950 upset win over number-two Michigan State in East Lansing, Michigan.

In 1951, Gierula was selected in the tenth round of the 1951 NFL draft by the Cleveland Browns. In 1954, Gierula (along with Bobby Garrett, John Bauer, and Jack Miller) was traded to the Green Bay Packers for Babe Parilli and Bob Fleck. He died in 1990 at the age of 62.
