= Red Cochrane =

Red Cochrane may refer to:

- Freddie 'Red' Cochrane, boxer
- Kenneth Cochrane, college football coach
