= 1953 Toledo Rockets football team =

American college football season

1953 Toledo Rockets football
- Conference: Mid-American Conference
- Record: 3–6 (2–3 MAC)
- Head coach: Claire Dunn (3rd season)
- Home stadium: Glass Bowl

1953 Mid-American Conference football standings
	Conf.					Overall
Team	W		L		T	W		L		T
Ohio $	5	–	0	–	1	6	–	2	–	1
Miami (OH)	3	–	0	–	1	7	–	1	–	1
Kent State	3	–	1	–	0	7	–	2	–	0
Toledo	2	–	3	–	0	3	–	6	–	0
Western Reserve	1	–	2	–	1	5	–	3	–	1
Western Michigan	0	–	4	–	1	1	–	6	–	1
Bowling Green	0	–	4	–	0	1	–	8	–	0
$ – Conference champion

The 1953 Toledo Rockets football team was an American football team that represented Toledo University in the Mid-American Conference (MAC) during the 1953 college football season. In their third and final season under head coach Claire Dunn, the Rockets compiled a 3–6 record (2–3 against MAC opponents), finished in fourth place in the MAC, and were outscored by their opponents by a combined total of 305 to 113.

The team's statistical leaders included Dave Andrzejewski with 403 passing yards, Mel Triplett with 479 rushing yards, and Rick Kaser with 189 receiving yards.

== Schedule ==
Date	Opponent	Site	Result	Attendance	Source
September 19	Ohio	Glass Bowl; Toledo, OH	L 0–26		
September 26	at Western Reserve	Clarke Field; Cleveland, OH	L 20–21		
October 3	Fort Belvoir*	Glass Bowl; Toledo, OH	L 13–62		
October 10	at Cincinnati*	Nippert Stadium; Cincinnati, OH	L 7–41	15,000	
October 17	Western Michigan	Glass Bowl; Toledo, OH	W 19–7		
October 24	at Bowling Green	University Stadium; Bowling Green, OH (rivalry)	W 20–19		
October 31	Miami (OH)	Glass Bowl; Toledo, OH	L 0–81		
November 7	at Bradley*	Peoria, IL	W 27–12		
November 14	John Carroll*	Glass Bowl; Toledo, OH	L 7–36		
*Non-conference game

== After the season ==
=== NFL draft ===
The following Rockets were selected in the 1954 NFL draft following the season.

Round	Pick	Player	Position	NFL club
6	72	Asa Jenkins	Back	Cleveland Browns
17	205	Richard Kaser	Back	Detroit Lions
