= LaGrange High School =

LaGrange High School may refer to:

- LaGrange High School (Georgia) in LaGrange, Georgia
- LaGrange High School (Louisiana) in Lake Charles, Louisiana
- LaGrange High School (Indiana) (1877–1978) in LaGrange, Indiana

Schools with similar names include:

- La Grange High School in La Grange, Texas
- La Grande High School in La Grande, Oregon
