= Panfil =

Panfil is a surname. Notable people with this surname include:

- Grzegorz Panfil (born 1988), Polish tennis player
- Ken Panfil (1930–2002), American football player
- Wanda Panfil (born 1959), Polish athlete
