= Ron Hansen =

Ron Hansen may refer to:

- Ron Hansen (novelist) (born 1947), American novelist
- Ron Hansen (politician) (born 1943), Canadian politician
- Ron Hansen (baseball) (born 1938), American former MLB player
- Ron Hansen (American football) (1932–1993), American NFL player
