= Ledio Fanucchi =

American football player (1931–2014)

No. 73
- Positions: Offensive tackle, defensive tackle

Personal information
- Born: March 27, 1931; Fresno, California, U.S.
- Died: November 27, 2014 (aged 83); Fresno, California, U.S.
- Listed height: 6 ft 2 in (1.88 m)
- Listed weight: 225 lb (102 kg)

Career information
- High school: Fresno
- College: Fresno State (1951–1953)
- NFL draft: 1954: 22nd round, 254th overall pick

Career history
- Chicago Cardinals (1954)

Career NFL statistics
- Games played: 12
- Games started: 6
- Fumble recoveries: 1
- Stats at Pro Football Reference

Ledio Fanucchi (March 27, 1931 – November 27, 2014) was an American professional football tackle and defensive tackle. He was selected by the Chicago Cardinals in the 22nd round (254th overall) of the 1954 NFL draft. He played for the Cardinals in 1954.

He died on November 27, 2014, in Fresno, California, at age 83.
