= Tom Jones (gridiron football) =

American football player (1931–1978)

No. 77, 61, 73
- Position: Tackle

Personal information
- Born: June 22, 1931; Cincinnati, Ohio, U.S.
- Died: August 28, 1978 (aged 47); Muskoka District Municipality, Ontario, Canada
- Listed height: 6 ft 5 in (1.96 m)
- Listed weight: 255 lb (116 kg)

Career information
- High school: Central Vocational (Cincinnati)
- College: Kentucky State; Miami (OH) (1952–1954)
- NFL draft: 1954: 9th round, 108th overall pick

Career history
- Cleveland Browns (1955); Ottawa Rough Riders (1957–1961); Toronto Argonauts (1962); Toronto Rifles (1965–1967)

Awards and highlights
- NFL champion (1955); Grey Cup champion (1960); Second-team All-American (1954)

Career NFL statistics
- Games played: 2
- Stats at Pro Football Reference

Thomas Lee Jones (June 22, 1931 – August 28, 1978) was an American professional football player in the National Football League (NFL) and Canadian Football League (CFL). He played in the CFL for the Ottawa Rough Riders and Toronto Argonauts. He won the Grey Cup with Ottawa in 1960. He played college football at Kentucky State University and Miami University and was selected by the Cleveland Browns in the 1954 NFL draft (Round 9, #108 overall). He played two games for them in 1955.

Jones was also an All-American shot putter for the Miami RedHawks track and field team.
