= Wayne Berry (American football) =

American football player (1932–2018)

No. 24
- Positions: Halfback, defensive back

Personal information
- Born: August 2, 1932; La Grande, Oregon, U.S.
- Died: October 5, 2018 (aged 86); Eagle, Idaho, U.S.
- Listed height: 6 ft 0 in (1.83 m)
- Listed weight: 175 lb (79 kg)

Career information
- High school: La Grande
- College: Washington State
- NFL draft: 1954: 7th round, 76th overall pick

Career history
- New York Giants (1954)

Awards and highlights
- Second-team All-PCC (1953)

Career NFL statistics
- Rushing yards: 30
- Rushing average: 30
- Stats at Pro Football Reference

Wayne Berry (August 2, 1932 – October 5, 2018) was an American professional football halfback. He played for the New York Giants in 1954.

He died on October 5, 2018, in Eagle, Idaho at age 86.
