= 1952 Western Michigan Broncos football team =

American college football season

1952 Western Michigan Broncos football
- Conference: Mid-American Conference
- Record: 4–4 (1–4 MAC)
- Head coach: John Gill (11th season)
- MVP: Willard Brown
- Captain: Chuck Higgins
- Home stadium: Waldo Stadium

1952 Mid-American Conference football standings
	Conf.					Overall
Team	W		L		T	W		L		T
Cincinnati $	3	–	0	–	0	8	–	1	–	1
Miami (OH)	4	–	1	–	0	8	–	1	–	0
Ohio	5	–	2	–	0	6	–	2	–	2
Bowling Green	2	–	2	–	0	7	–	2	–	0
Kent State	2	–	2	–	0	5	–	4	–	0
Western Michigan	1	–	4	–	0	4	–	4	–	0
Western Reserve	1	–	4	–	0	5	–	4	–	0
Toledo	1	–	4	–	0	4	–	5	–	0
$ – Conference champion

The 1952 Western Michigan Broncos football team represented Michigan College of Education (later renamed Western Michigan University) in the Mid-American Conference (MAC) during the 1952 college football season. In their 11th and final season under head coach John Gill, the Broncos compiled a 4–4 record (1–4 against MAC opponents), finished in sixth place in the MAC, and were outscored by their opponents, 159 to 154. The team played its home games at Waldo Stadium in Kalamazoo, Michigan.

Quarterback Chuck Higgins was the team captain. Halfback Willard Brown received the team's most outstanding player award.

In December 1952, coach Gill became the school's associate athletic director; Jack Petoskey, who had been an assistant coach, became the school's new head football coach.

== Schedule ==
Date	Time	Opponent	Site	Result	Attendance	Source
September 22		at Kent State	Memorial Stadium; Kent, OH	L 13–20		
September 27		Illinois Wesleyan*	Waldo Stadium; Kalamazoo, MI	W 44–6		
October 4		at Central Michigan*	Alumni Field; Mount Pleasant, MI (rivalry)	W 18–0	3,500	
October 11		at Miami (OH)	Miami Field; Oxford, OH	L 6–55		
October 18		Toledo	Waldo Stadium; Kalamazoo, MI	W 19–14		
October 25	3:00 p.m.	at Washington University*	Francis Field; St. Louis, MO	W 28–20	8,000	
November 1		at Ohio	Peden Stadium; Athens, OH	L 13–28	6,500	
November 8		Western Reserve	Waldo Stadium; Kalamazoo, MI	L 13–16		
*Non-conference game; All times are in Eastern time
