= George Roman =

American football player (1926–2002)

No. 31, 79
- Position: Tackle

Personal information
- Born: February 2, 1926; Rankin, Pennsylvania, U.S.
- Died: June 30, 2002 (aged 76); Columbus, Georgia, U.S.
- Listed height: 6 ft 4 in (1.93 m)
- Listed weight: 242 lb (110 kg)

Career information
- High school: Penn Hills (Pittsburgh, Pennsylvania)
- College: Western Reserve
- NFL draft: 1948: 11th round, 89th overall pick

Career history
- Boston Yanks/New York Bulldogs (1948–1949); New York Giants (1950)

Career NFL statistics
- Games played: 26
- Games started: 4
- Stats at Pro Football Reference

George Roman (February 20, 1926 – June 30, 2002) was a professional American football defensive tackle who played three seasons for Boston Yanks/New York Bulldogs and New York Giants in the National Football League (NFL).

Roman was born in Rankin, Pennsylvania and grew up in Verona, attending Penn Hills High School in Penn Hills.

== College and professional career ==
During his college years, Roman was a standout football player at Western Reserve, now known as Case Western Reserve University. He also participated in basketball and track, being a member of the respective teams.

Throughout his professional career, he played for a total of three seasons with the Boston Yanks, New York Bulldogs, and New York Giants in the National Football League (NFL) from 1948 to 1950 before sustaining a back injury.

Following his tenure in professional football, he returned to Western Reserve University as part of the staff, notably assuming the role of coaching the golf team in 1952 and 1953, as well as serving as an assistant football coach in 1952.

Roman received inductions into both the Penn Hills and Case Western Reserve University athletic halls of fame.
