= 1953 Akron Zips football team =

American college football season

1953 Akron Zips football
- Conference: Ohio Athletic Conference
- Record: 6–3 (4–2 OAC)
- Head coach: Kenneth Cochrane (2nd season)
- Captain: Frank Gradyan
- Home stadium: Rubber Bowl

1953 Ohio Athletic Conference football standings
	Conf.					Overall
Team	W		L		T	W		L		T
Ohio Wesleyan $	7	–	0	–	0	8	–	0	–	1
Heidelberg	4	–	1	–	1	7	–	1	–	1
Otterbein	5	–	2	–	0	5	–	3	–	0
Denison	4	–	2	–	0	7	–	2	–	0
Akron	4	–	2	–	0	6	–	3	–	0
Capital	3	–	2	–	0	5	–	3	–	0
Wooster	3	–	3	–	0	5	–	3	–	0
Muskingum	3	–	3	–	1	3	–	4	–	1
Mount Union	2	–	3	–	0	5	–	4	–	0
Wittenberg	2	–	4	–	0	3	–	6	–	0
Kenyon	1	–	3	–	0	3	–	4	–	0
Oberlin	0	–	5	–	0	1	–	6	–	1
Hiram	0	–	4	–	0	1	–	6	–	0
Marietta	0	–	4	–	0	1	–	6	–	0
$ – Conference champion

The 1953 Akron Zips football team was an American football team that represented the University of Akron in the Ohio Athletic Conference (OAC) during the 1953 college football season. In its second and final season under head coach Kenneth Cochrane, the team compiled a 6–3 record (4–2 against OAC opponents) and was outscored by a total of 210 to 198. Frank Gradyan was the team captain. The team played its home games at the Rubber Bowl in Akron, Ohio.

== Schedule ==
Date	Opponent	Site	Result	Attendance	Source
September 19	Findlay*	Rubber Bowl; Akron, OH	W 26–12		
September 26	at Wittenberg	Springfield, OH	W 39–12		
October 3	Muskingum	Rubber Bowl; Akron, OH	W 26–13		
October 10	at West Virginia Tech*	Montgomery, WV	W 38–32		
October 17	Mount Union	Rubber Bowl; Akron, OH	W 16–15		
October 24	at Wooster	Wooster, OH	W 20–18		
November 7	at Kent State*	Memorial Stadium; Kent, OH (Wagon Wheel)	L 19–54	8,500	
November 14	at Heidelberg	Tiffin, OH	L 0–26		
November 21	Ohio Wesleyan	Rubber Bowl; Akron, OH	L 14–28		
*Non-conference game
