= 1952 Kent State Golden Flashes football team =

American college football season

1952 Kent State Golden Flashes football
- Conference: Mid-American Conference
- Record: 5–4 (2–2 MAC)
- Head coach: Trevor J. Rees (7th season)
- Home stadium: Memorial Stadium

1952 Mid-American Conference football standings
	Conf.					Overall
Team	W		L		T	W		L		T
Cincinnati $	3	–	0	–	0	8	–	1	–	1
Miami (OH)	4	–	1	–	0	8	–	1	–	0
Ohio	5	–	2	–	0	6	–	2	–	2
Bowling Green	2	–	2	–	0	7	–	2	–	0
Kent State	2	–	2	–	0	5	–	4	–	0
Western Michigan	1	–	4	–	0	4	–	4	–	0
Western Reserve	1	–	4	–	0	5	–	4	–	0
Toledo	1	–	4	–	0	4	–	5	–	0
$ – Conference champion

The 1952 Kent State Golden Flashes football team was an American football team that represented Kent State University in the Mid-American Conference (MAC) during the 1952 college football season. In their seventh season under head coach Trevor J. Rees, the Golden Flashes compiled a 5–4 record (2–2 against MAC opponents), finished in fifth place in the MAC, and outscored all opponents by a combined total of 204 to 180.

The team's statistical leaders included Jim Cullom with 822 rushing yards, 822 yards of total offense, and 74 receiving yards. Offensive tackle Al Kilgore was selected as a first-team All-MAC player.

== Schedule ==
Date	Opponent	Site	Result	Attendance	Source
September 20	Western Michigan	Memorial Stadium; Kent, OH	W 20–13		
September 26	at Mount Union*	Mount Union Stadium; Alliance, OH	W 26–7		
October 3	Western Reserve	Memorial Stadium; Kent, OH	W 25–19		
October 11	at Baldwin–Wallace*	Berea, OH	L 13–19		
October 18	Ohio	Memorial Stadium; Kent, OH	L 18–27		
October 25	at Marshall*	Fairfield Stadium; Huntington, WV	W 26–14		
November 1	Bowling Green	Memorial Stadium; Kent, OH (rivalry)	L 21–44		
November 7	at Akron*	Rubber Bowl; Akron, OH (Wagon Wheel)	W 34–14	8,000	
November 15	at New Hampshire*	Cowell Stadium; Durham, NH	L 21–23		
*Non-conference game
