= George Timberlake =

American football player (1932–2012)

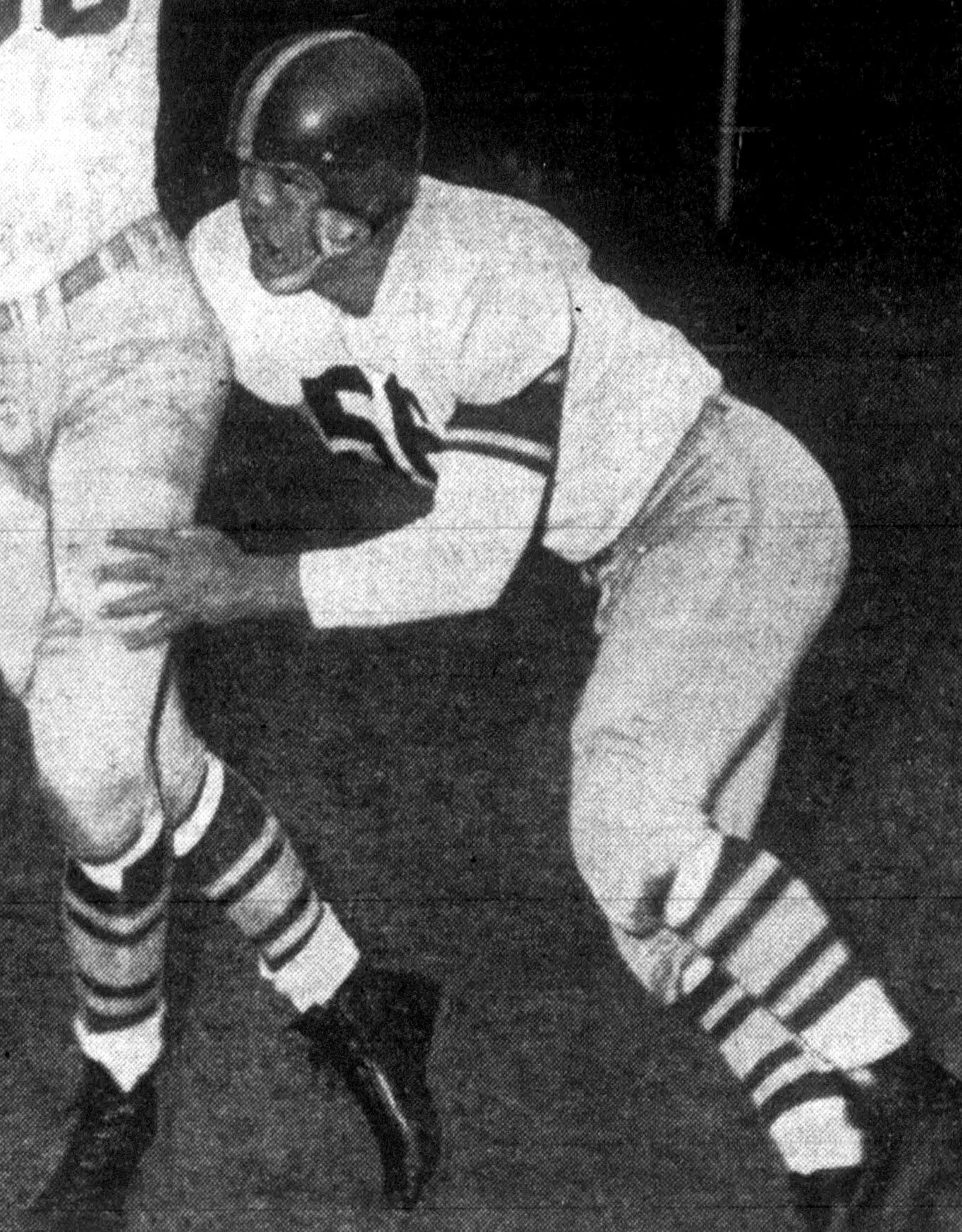
- Timberlake, circa 1953

No. 53
- Positions: Linebacker, guard

Personal information
- Born: November 3, 1932; Long Beach, California, U.S.
- Died: November 7, 2012 (aged 80); Seal Beach, California, U.S.
- Listed height: 6 ft 1 in (1.85 m)
- Listed weight: 220 lb (100 kg)

Career information
- High school: Jordan Long Beach
- College: USC (1952–1953)
- NFL draft: 1954: 3rd round, 27th overall pick

Career history
- Green Bay Packers (1955)

Awards and highlights
- Third-team All-American (1953); 2× First-team All-PCC (1952, 1953)

Career NFL statistics
- Games played: 6
- Stats at Pro Football Reference

George Robert Timberlake (November 3, 1932 – November 7, 2012) was an American professional football player. He played professionally as a linebacker in the National Football League (NFL). He was drafted by the Green Bay Packers in the third round of the 1954 NFL draft and played with the team during the 1955 NFL season. He played college football at the University of Southern California.
