= 1952 Ohio Bobcats football team =

American college football season

1952 Ohio Bobcats football
- Conference: Mid-American Conference
- Record: 6–2–1 (5–2 MAC)
- Head coach: Carroll Widdoes (4th season)
- Home stadium: Peden Stadium

1952 Mid-American Conference football standings
	Conf.					Overall
Team	W		L		T	W		L		T
Cincinnati $	3	–	0	–	0	8	–	1	–	1
Miami (OH)	4	–	1	–	0	8	–	1	–	0
Ohio	5	–	2	–	0	6	–	2	–	2
Bowling Green	2	–	2	–	0	7	–	2	–	0
Kent State	2	–	2	–	0	5	–	4	–	0
Western Michigan	1	–	4	–	0	4	–	4	–	0
Western Reserve	1	–	4	–	0	5	–	4	–	0
Toledo	1	–	4	–	0	4	–	5	–	0
$ – Conference champion

The 1952 Ohio Bobcats football team was an American football team that represented Ohio University in the Mid-American Conference (MAC) during the 1952 college football season. In their fourth season under head coach Carroll Widdoes, the Bobcats compiled a 6–2–1 record (5–2 against MAC opponents), finished in third place in the MAC, and outscored all opponents by a combined total of 180 to 133. They played their home games in Peden Stadium in Athens, Ohio.

The team's statistical leaders included Dick Phillips with 345 rushing yards, Bill Frederick with 845 passing yards, and Lou Sawchik with 472 receiving yards. Center Vince Costello was named to the Little All-America Team.

== Schedule ==
Date	Opponent	Site	Result	Attendance	Source
September 27	at Morris Harvey*	Laidley Field; Charleston, WV	W 20–6		
October 4	Toledo	Peden Stadium; Athens, OH	W 22–20		
October 11	at Western Reserve	Clarke Field; Cleveland, OH	W 22–7		
October 18	at Kent State	Memorial Stadium; Kent, OH	W 27–18		
October 25	Miami (OH)	Peden Stadium; Athens, OH (rivalry)	L 0–20		
November 1	Western Michigan	Peden Stadium; Athens, OH	W 28–13	6,500	
November 8	at Cincinnati	Nippert Stadium; Cincinnati, OH	L 7–41		
November 15	at Bowling Green	University Stadium; Bowling Green, OH	W 33–14		
November 22	Marshall*	Peden Stadium; Athens, OH (rivalry)	T 21–21		
*Non-conference game
