= 1952 Akron Zips football team =

American college football season

1952 Akron Zips football
- Conference: Ohio Athletic Conference
- Record: 2–6–1 (2–2–1 OAC)
- Head coach: Kenneth Cochrane (1st season)
- Captains: Joe Mazzaferro; Bob Vogt
- Home stadium: Rubber Bowl

1952 Ohio Athletic Conference football standings
	Conf.					Overall
Team	W		L		T	W		L		T
Heidelberg $	5	–	1	–	0	8	–	1	–	0
Wooster	4	–	1	–	1	7	–	1	–	1
Muskingum	5	–	2	–	0	6	–	3	–	0
Ohio Wesleyan	5	–	2	–	0	6	–	3	–	0
Denison	4	–	2	–	0	4	–	4	–	0
Hiram	3	–	3	–	0	5	–	3	–	0
Akron	2	–	2	–	1	2	–	6	–	1
Capital	2	–	3	–	0	4	–	4	–	0
Oberlin	2	–	3	–	0	3	–	5	–	0
Wittenberg	2	–	4	–	0	5	–	4	–	0
Otterbein	2	–	5	–	0	2	–	6	–	0
Kenyon	1	–	3	–	0	3	–	3	–	0
Marietta	1	–	4	–	0	2	–	5	–	1
Mount Union	1	–	4	–	0	1	–	7	–	0
$ – Conference champion

The 1952 Akron Zips football team was an American football team that represented the University of Akron in the Ohio Athletic Conference (OAC) during the 1952 college football season. In their second and final season under head coach Kenneth Cochrane, the Zips compiled a 2–6–1 record (2–2–1 against OAC opponents) and were outscored by a total of 156 to 121. Joe Mazzaferro and Bob Vogt were the team captains. The team played its home games at the Rubber Bowl in Akron, Ohio.

== Schedule ==
Date	Opponent	Site	Result	Attendance	Source
September 20	at Findlay*	Findlay, OH	L 6–7		
September 27	Wittenberg	Rubber Bowl; Akron, OH	W 27–6	4,580	
October 4	at Baldwin–Wallace*	Berea, OH	L 7–33		
October 11	West Virginia Tech*	Rubber Bowl; Akron, OH	L 13–14		
October 18	at Mount Union	Alliance, OH	L 6–7		
October 25	Wooster^{†}	Rubber Bowl; Akron, OH	T 14–14	5,000	
November 1	Hiram	Rubber Bowl; Akron, OH	W 28–14		
November 7	Kent State*	Rubber Bowl; Akron, OH (Wagon Wheel)	L 14–34	8,000	
November 15	Heidelberg	Rubber Bowl; Akron, OH	L 6–27		
*Non-conference game; ^{†}Homecoming
