= 1952 Bowling Green Falcons football team =

American college football season

1952 Bowling Green Falcons football
- Conference: Mid-American Conference
- Record: 7–2 (2–2 MAC)
- Head coach: Robert Whittaker (12th season)
- MVP: Fred Durig
- Captain: Darrell Clay
- Home stadium: University Stadium

1952 Mid-American Conference football standings
	Conf.					Overall
Team	W		L		T	W		L		T
Cincinnati $	3	–	0	–	0	8	–	1	–	1
Miami (OH)	4	–	1	–	0	8	–	1	–	0
Ohio	5	–	2	–	0	6	–	2	–	2
Bowling Green	2	–	2	–	0	7	–	2	–	0
Kent State	2	–	2	–	0	5	–	4	–	0
Western Michigan	1	–	4	–	0	4	–	4	–	0
Western Reserve	1	–	4	–	0	5	–	4	–	0
Toledo	1	–	4	–	0	4	–	5	–	0
$ – Conference champion

The 1952 Bowling Green Falcons football team was an American football team that represented Bowling Green State University in the Mid-American Conference (MAC) during the 1952 college football season. In their 12th season under head coach Robert Whittaker, the Falcons compiled a 7–2 record (2–2 against MAC opponents), finished in fourth place in the MAC, and outscored all opponents by a combined total of 257 to 155.

The team's statistical leaders were Bill Lyons with 915 passing yards, and Fred Durig with 858 rushing yards, and Jim Ladd with 632 receiving yards. Darrell Clay was the team captain. Fullback Fred Durig received the team's Most Valuable Player award.

== Schedule ==
Date	Opponent	Site	Result	Attendance	Source
September 20	Central Michigan*	University Stadium; Bowling Green, OH	W 20–7		
September 27	Miami (OH)	University Stadium; Bowling Green, OH	L 7–42	4,200	
October 4	at Ohio Wesleyan*	Edwards Field; Delaware, OH	W 45–0		
October 11	at Bradley*	Peoria Stadium; Peoria, IL	W 21–14		
October 18	Baldwin–Wallace*	University Stadium; Bowling Green, OH	W 27–19		
October 25	at Toledo	Glass Bowl; Toledo, OH (rivalry)	W 29–19		
November 1	at Kent State	Memorial Stadium; Kent, OH (rivalry)	W 44–21		
November 8	Youngstown*	University Stadium; Bowling Green, OH	W 50–0		
November 15	Ohio	University Stadium; Bowling Green, OH	L 14–33		
*Non-conference game
