= Jim Kincaid (gridiron football) =

American football player (1930–2014)

No. 24, 81, 86
- Position: Defensive back

Personal information
- Born: August 11, 1930; Ansted, West Virginia, U.S.
- Died: September 25, 2014 (aged 84); Goldsboro, North Carolina, U.S.
- Listed height: 5 ft 11 in (1.80 m)
- Listed weight: 180 lb (82 kg)

Career information
- College: South Carolina
- NFL draft: 1954: 3rd round, 29th overall pick

Career history
- Washington Redskins (1954); Hamilton Tiger-Cats (1955); Montreal Alouettes (1955)
- Stats at Pro Football Reference

James Davis "Blackie" Kincaid (August 11, 1930 – September 25, 2014) was an American football defensive back for the Washington Redskins in the National Football League (NFL). He played college football at the University of South Carolina and was drafted in the third round of the 1954 NFL draft by the Los Angeles Rams. He also played for the Hamilton Tiger-Cats and Montreal Alouettes of the Canadian Football League (CFL). Kincaid died on September 25, 2014, in Goldsboro, North Carolina.
