= Duane Wardlow =

American football player (1932–2017)

C. Duane Wardlow
No. 89, 83
- Position: Defensive end

Personal information
- Born: July 2, 1932; Washougal, Washington, U.S.
- Died: August 7, 2017 (aged 85); Everett, Washington, U.S.
- Listed height: 6 ft 4 in (1.93 m)
- Listed weight: 215 lb (98 kg)

Career information
- High school: Hoquiam (Hoquiam, Washington)
- College: Washington
- NFL draft: 1954: 11th round, 130th overall pick

Career history
- Los Angeles Rams (1954, 1956)

Awards and highlights
- First-team All-PCC (1953)
- Stats at Pro Football Reference

Clyde Duane Wardlow (July 2, 1932 – August 7, 2017) was an American football player who played for Los Angeles Rams of the National Football League (NFL). He played college football at the University of Washington.
