= Dewey Brundage =

American football player (1931–2022)

No. 83
- Position: Defensive end

Personal information
- Born: October 1, 1931; Alhambra, California, U.S.
- Died: July 7, 2022 (aged 90); Orem, Utah, U.S.
- Listed height: 6 ft 3 in (1.91 m)
- Listed weight: 210 lb (95 kg)

Career information
- High school: El Monte (El Monte, California)
- College: BYU
- NFL draft: 1954: 22nd round, 265th overall pick

Career history
- Pittsburgh Steelers (1954)

Career NFL statistics
- Games played: 12
- Stats at Pro Football Reference

Jean Dewey Brundage (born October 1, 1931 – July 7, 2022) was an American professional football player who was a defensive end for the Pittsburgh Steelers of the National Football League (NFL). He played college football for the BYU Cougars.

== Background ==
=== Early life ===
Brundage was born in Alhambra, California, as the youngest of four children to Frank and Georgia Brundage on October 1, 1931.

=== Career ===
Brundage played for Brigham Young University as an end for the Cougars. He was nominated in 1953 for the Associated Press all-America football team. He was a defensive end (#83) for the Pittsburgh Steelers of the NFL for one season in 1954, before being inducted into the US Army in early 1955. He acted as coach for the Manti High School Templars from 1980 to 1981 with a season score of 3 wins and 15 losses.

=== Personal life ===
He is married to Katherine Brundage and has four children.

=== Death ===
He died on July 7, 2022, in Orem, Utah.
