= Earl Putman =

American football player (1932–2006)

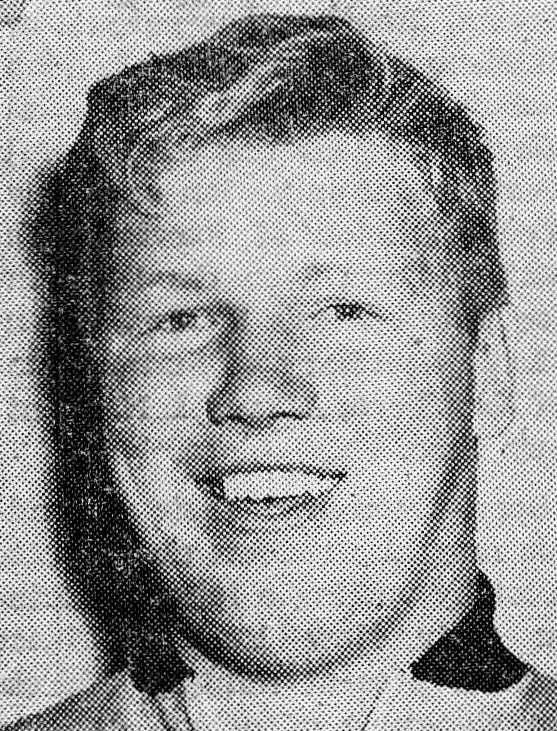
- Putman, circa 1953

No. 61, 50
- Position: Center

Personal information
- Born: January 10, 1932; Cincinnati, Ohio, U.S.
- Died: February 19, 2006 (aged 74); Phoenix, Arizona, U.S.
- Listed height: 6 ft 6 in (1.98 m)
- Listed weight: 308 lb (140 kg)

Career information
- High school: Hughes (Cincinnati)
- College: Arizona State
- NFL draft: 1954: 5th round, 52nd overall pick

Career history
- Hamilton Tiger-Cats (1956); Chicago Cardinals (1957)

Career NFL statistics
- Games played: 12
- Games started: 12
- Stats at Pro Football Reference

Earl Robert "Tiny" Putman (January 10, 1932 – February 19, 2006), surname sometimes misspelled "Putnam", was an American professional football player who was a center in the National Football League (NFL) for the Chicago Cardinals during the 1957 season. He appeared in a total of 12 NFL games, all of them as a starter. He played college football for the Arizona State Sun Devils

== Early life ==
Putman was born in 1932 in Cincinnati and attended Hughes High School in that city. He played football and competed in the shot put and discus while in high school.

== College and military service ==
Putman enrolled at Arizona State University in the fall of 1951. He again competed in both football as well as the shot put and discus. His college education was interrupted by service in the U.S. Army from 1952 to 1954 during the Korean War. He played for the Fort Ord football team in 1953. He graduated from Arizona State in 1957 and later received a master's degree from Northern Arizona University.

== Professional football ==
He was selected by the New York Giants in the fifth round with the 52nd overall pick in the 1954 NFL draft. He was the biggest man ever signed by the Giants at the time, and the biggest man in professional football in 1955, at 6 feet, 6 inches, and 310 pounds, but did not appear in any regular season games for the Giants. He signed with the Hamilton Tiger-Cats of the Canadian Football League (CFL) and appeared in one game for Hamilton in 1956. He then signed with the Chicago Cardinals and started 12 games during the 1957 season. at 6 feet, 6 inches and 308 pounds, he was reportedly the biggest man in professional football in 1957.

== Later life ==
After his professional football career ended, Putman returned to Arizona. He was an assistant high school football coach at Carl Hayden High School in Phoenix, Arizona, and Glendale High School in the late 1950s and early 1960s. He was the head football coach at Moon Valley High School in Phoenix for 25 years from 1965 to 1989. In 1997, he was inducted into the National High School Coaches Association Hall of Fame. He died of brain cancer in 2006 at age 74.
