= Clifford Charlton =

American football player (born 1965)

No. 58
- Position: Linebacker

Personal information
- Born: February 16, 1965 (age 61); Tallahassee, Florida, U.S.
- Listed height: 6 ft 3 in (1.91 m)
- Listed weight: 240 lb (109 kg)

Career information
- High school: Leon (Tallahassee)
- College: Florida
- NFL draft: 1988: 1st round, 21st overall pick

Career history
- Cleveland Browns (1988–1989); Miami Dolphins (1990)*; Kansas City Chiefs (1991)*
- * Offseason or practice squad member only

Awards and highlights
- First-team All-American (1987); 2× First-team All-SEC (1986, 1987)

Career NFL statistics
- Sacks: 1
- Stats at Pro Football Reference

Clifford Tyrone Charlton (born February 16, 1965) is an American former professional football player who was a linebacker in the National Football League (NFL) for two seasons during the late 1980s. Charlton played college football for the University of Florida, and received All-American honors. A first-round pick in the 1988 NFL draft, he played professionally for the NFL's Cleveland Browns.

== Early life ==
Charlton was born in Tallahassee, Florida in 1965. He attended Leon High School in Tallahassee, where he was a standout high school football player for the Leon Lions.

== College career ==
Charlton accepted an athletic scholarship to attend the University of Florida in Gainesville, Florida, and played linebacker for coach Galen Hall's Florida Gators football team from 1984 to 1987. He was a member of the Gators' best-in-the-Southeastern Conference (SEC) football teams that posted identical 9–1–1 overall win–loss records in 1984 and 1985. He was also a first-team All-SEC selection in 1986 and 1987, and a first-team All-American and team captain in 1987. Charlton's fifteen forced fumbles, forty-nine career tackles for a loss and twenty-five quarterback sacks still rank first, fifth and fourth, respectively, on the Gators' all-time career records lists.

Charlton graduated from the University of Florida with a bachelor's degree in psychology in 1988.

== Professional career ==
Charlton was selected by the Cleveland Browns in the first round of the 1988 NFL Draft with the 21st overall pick. He played in thirty-one games for the Browns during the 1988 and 1989 seasons. As a first round pick, the Browns had high expectations for Charlton. However, he suffered a severe knee injury that tore the MCL and ACL ligaments of his knee that prematurely ended his professional career.

== See also ==
- 1987 College Football All-America Team
- Florida Gators football, 1980–89
- History of the Cleveland Browns
- List of Cleveland Browns first-round draft picks
- List of Florida Gators football All-Americans
- List of Florida Gators in the NFL draft
- List of University of Florida alumni
