= 1952 Toledo Rockets football team =

American college football season

1952 Toledo Rockets football
- Conference: Mid-American Conference
- Record: 4–5 (1–4 MAC)
- Head coach: Claire Dunn (2nd season)
- Home stadium: Glass Bowl

1952 Mid-American Conference football standings
	Conf.					Overall
Team	W		L		T	W		L		T
Cincinnati $	3	–	0	–	0	8	–	1	–	1
Miami (OH)	4	–	1	–	0	8	–	1	–	0
Ohio	5	–	2	–	0	6	–	2	–	2
Bowling Green	2	–	2	–	0	7	–	2	–	0
Kent State	2	–	2	–	0	5	–	4	–	0
Western Michigan	1	–	4	–	0	4	–	4	–	0
Western Reserve	1	–	4	–	0	5	–	4	–	0
Toledo	1	–	4	–	0	4	–	5	–	0
$ – Conference champion

The 1952 Toledo Rockets football team was an American football team that represented Toledo University in the Mid-American Conference (MAC) during the 1952 college football season. In their second season under head coach Claire Dunn, the Rockets compiled a 4–5 record (1–4 against MAC opponents), finished in a tie for sixth place in the MAC, and were outscored by their opponents by a combined total of 151 to 132.

The team's statistical leaders included Dave Andrzejewski with 582 passing yards and Bob Carson with 322 rushing yards and 428 receiving yards.

== Schedule ==
Date	Opponent	Site	Result
September 20	Eastern Kentucky*	Glass Bowl; Toledo, OH	L 6–7
September 27	Western Reserve	Glass Bowl; Toledo, OH	W 10–9
October 4	at Ohio	Peden Stadium; Athens, OH	L 20–22
October 11	John Carroll*	Glass Bowl; Toledo, OH	W 6–3
October 18	at Western Michigan	Waldo Stadium; Kalamazoo, MI	L 14–19
October 25	Bowling Green	Glass Bowl; Toledo, OH (rivalry)	L 19–29
November 1	at Miami (OH)	Miami Field; Oxford, OH	L 13–27
November 8	Bradley*	Glass Bowl; Toledo, OH	W 20–14
November 15	at Youngstown*	Youngstown, OH	W 24–21
*Non-conference game

== After the season ==
=== NFL draft ===
The following Rocket was selected in the 1953 NFL draft following the season.

Round	Pick	Player	Position	NFL club
21	252	Dick Gordon	Tackle	Los Angeles Rams
