= 1953 Western Michigan Broncos football team =

American college football season

1953 Western Michigan Broncos football
- Conference: Mid-American Conference
- Record: 1–6–1 (0–4–1 MAC)
- Head coach: Jack Petoskey (1st season)
- MVP: Leslie Koster
- Captain: Floyd Stollsteimer
- Home stadium: Waldo Stadium

1953 Mid-American Conference football standings
	Conf.					Overall
Team	W		L		T	W		L		T
Ohio $	5	–	0	–	1	6	–	2	–	1
Miami (OH)	3	–	0	–	1	7	–	1	–	1
Kent State	3	–	1	–	0	7	–	2	–	0
Toledo	2	–	3	–	0	3	–	6	–	0
Western Reserve	1	–	2	–	1	5	–	3	–	1
Western Michigan	0	–	4	–	1	1	–	6	–	1
Bowling Green	0	–	4	–	0	1	–	8	–	0
$ – Conference champion

The 1953 Western Michigan Broncos football team represented Michigan College of Education (later renamed Western Michigan University) in the Mid-American Conference (MAC) during the 1953 college football season. In their first season under head coach Jack Petoskey, the Broncos compiled a 1–6–1 record (0–4–1 against MAC opponents), finished in sixth place in the MAC, and were outscored by their opponents, 238 to 66. The team played its home games at Waldo Stadium in Kalamazoo, Michigan.

Guard Floyd Stollsteimer was the team captain. Offensive tackle Leslie Koster received the team's most outstanding player award.

In December 1952, assistant coach Jack Petoskey was appointed as the team's new head coach.

== Schedule ==
Date	Opponent	Site	Result	Attendance	Source
September 26	at Central Michigan*	Alumni Field; Mount Pleasant, MI (rivalry)	L 0–21		
October 3	at Illinois Wesleyan*	Bloomington, IL	W 20–7		
October 10	Miami (OH)	Waldo Stadium; Kalamazoo, MI	L 6–52		
October 17	at Toledo	Glass Bowl; Toledo, OH	L 7–19		
October 24	Washington University*^{†}	Waldo Stadium; Kalamazoo, MI	L 7–18	8,000	
October 31	Ohio	Waldo Stadium; Kalamazoo, MI	L 12–67		
November 7	at Western Reserve	Clarke Field; Cleveland, OH	T 14–14	< 200	
November 14	Kent State	Waldo Stadium; Kalamazoo, MI	L 0–40	2,500	
*Non-conference game; ^{†}Homecoming
