= Bucky Buckwalter =

American basketball player, coach, and executive

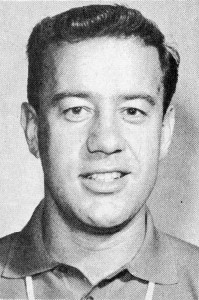
- Buckwalter, c. 1967

Personal information
- Born: November 22, 1933 (age 92)
- Listed height: 6 ft 3 in (1.91 m)

Career information
- High school: La Grande (La Grande, Oregon)
- College: Utah (1953–1956)
- NBA draft: 1956: undrafted
- Coaching career: 1959–1986

Career history

Coaching
- 1959–1967: Utah (assistant)
- 1967–1972: Seattle
- 1972–1973: Seattle SuperSonics (assistant)
- 1973: Seattle SuperSonics (interim)
- 1974–1975: Utah Stars
- 1979–1986: Portland Trail Blazers (assistant)

Morris B. "Bucky" Buckwalter (born November 22, 1933) is an American former professional basketball coach and executive. He played college basketball for the Utah Utes. Buckwalter served as an assistant coach and executive in the National Basketball Association (NBA) as well as a head coach in the American Basketball Association.

Buckwalter grew up in La Grande, Oregon, and played high school basketball at La Grande High School. Buckwalter played college basketball at Utah, where his team advanced to the quarterfinals of the 1956 NCAA basketball tournament before losing to the eventual champions, the Bill Russell-led San Francisco Dons.

Buckwalter served eight years as an assistant for the Utah Utes under head coach Jack Gardner. In May 1967, he joined the Seattle Redhawks as head coach.

He served briefly as head coach of the Seattle SuperSonics in 1972 (on an interim basis), and later served as the head coach of the Utah Stars of the ABA, replacing Joe Mullaney.

While with the Stars, Buckwalter was known for signing Moses Malone out of high school. He was a scout for the Portland Trail Blazers when the team passed on Michael Jordan and selected Kentucky's Sam Bowie as the second pick in the 1984 NBA draft. He served as vice-president of Basketball Operations for the Portland Trail Blazers. In 1991, he won the NBA Executive of the Year Award, as the Blazers posted a league-best 63–19 record. He retired from the Blazers in 1997.

== Head coaching record ==
=== College ===
Record table
Season	Team	Overall	Conference	Standing	Postseason
Seattle Chieftains (Independent) (1967–1971)
1967–68	Seattle	14–13			
1968–69	Seattle	20–8			NCAA University Division first round
1969–70	Seattle	15–10			
1970–71	Seattle	12–14			
Seattle Chieftains (West Coast Athletic Conference) (1971–1972)
1971–72	Seattle	17–9	10–4	3rd	
Seattle:		78–54 (.591)			
Total:		78–54 (.591)			

=== NBA/ABA ===
Legend
Regular season	G	Games coached	W	Games won	L	Games lost	W–L %	Win–loss %
Playoffs	PG	Playoff games	PW	Playoff wins	PL	Playoff losses	PW–L %	Playoff win–loss %

Team	Year	G	W	L	W–L%	Finish	PG	PW	PL	PW–L%	Result
Seattle	1972–73	37	13	24	.351	4th Pacific	—	—	—	—	Missed playoffs
Utah*	1974–75	56	24	32	.429	Left mid-season	—	—	—	—	
Career		93	37	56	.398		—	—	—	—	

Preceded by Joe Mullaney	Utah Stars head coach 1974–1975	Succeeded by Tom Nissalke
