= Sam Morley =

American football player (1932-2014)

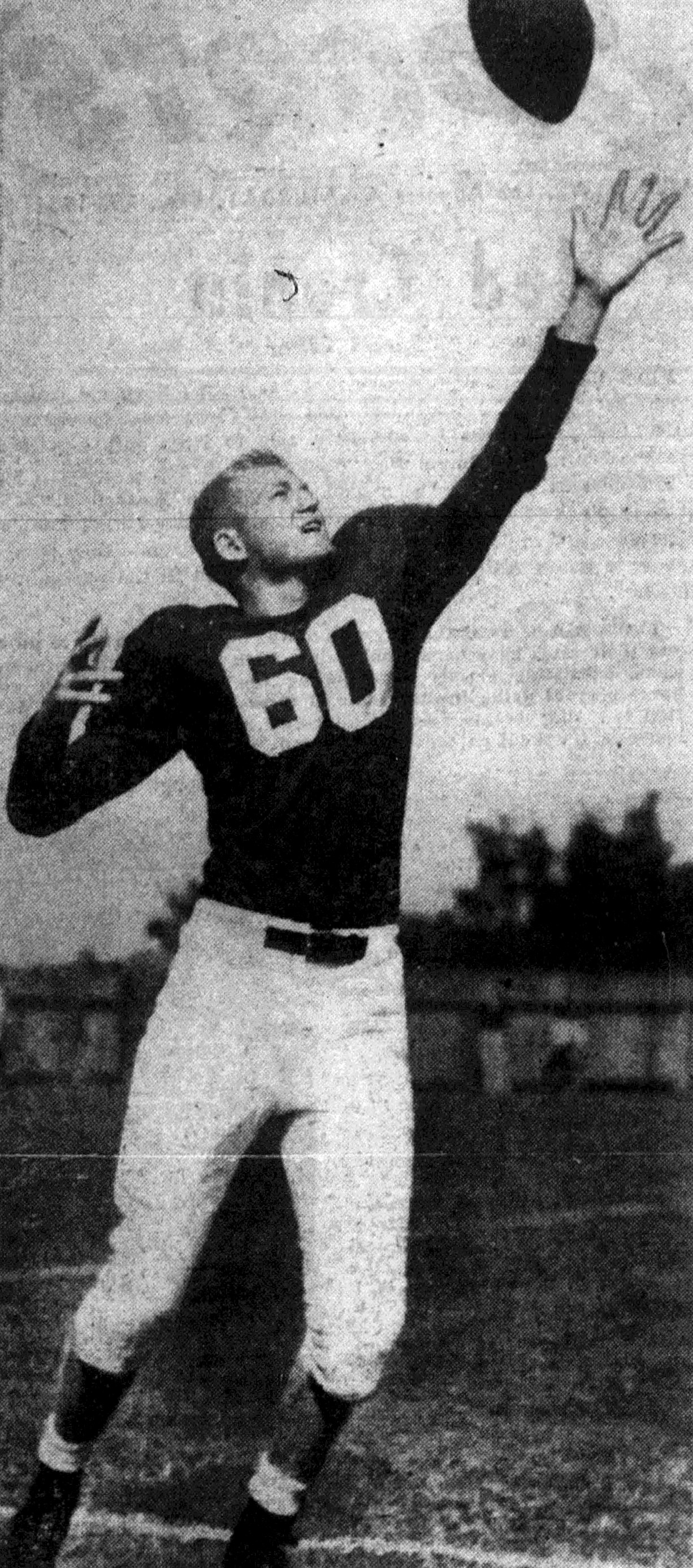
- Morley, circa 1951

No. 81
- Position: End

Personal information
- Born: May 12, 1932; Pasadena, California, U.S.
- Died: January 25, 2014 (aged 81); Mountain View, California, U.S.
- Listed height: 6 ft 2 in (1.88 m)
- Listed weight: 182 lb (83 kg)

Career information
- High school: San Marino (San Marino, California)
- College: Stanford
- NFL draft: 1954: 20th round, 236th overall pick

Career history
- Washington Redskins (1954)

Awards and highlights
- First-team All-American (1953); 2× First-team All-PCC (1952, 1953); Stanford Athletic Hall of Fame

Career NFL statistics
- Games played: 1
- Stats at Pro Football Reference

Samuel Robertson Morley (May 12, 1932 - January 25, 2014) was an American professional football end in the National Football League (NFL) for the Washington Redskins. He played college football at Stanford University and was drafted in the 20th round of the 1954 NFL draft.

After his NFL career, Morley became a family law attorney. He died on January 25, 2014, of congestive heart failure.

== See also ==
- List of NCAA major college football yearly receiving leaders
