= 1953 All-Pacific Coast football team =

American all-star college football team

The 1953 All-Pacific Coast football team consists of American football players chosen by various organizations for All-Pacific Coast teams for the 1953 college football season.

== Selections ==
=== Backs ===
- Bobby Garrett, Stanford (AP-1; UP-1; TW)
- Paul Cameron, UCLA (AP-1; UP-1; TW)
- George Shaw, Oregon (AP-1; UP-1; TW)
- Paul Larson, California (AP-2; UP-1; TW)
- Aramis Dandoy, USC (AP-1; UP-2)
- Wayne Berry, Washington St. (AP-2; UP-2)
- Flip Kleffner, Idaho (AP-2; UP-2)
- Al Talley, California (AP-2)
- Bob Davenport, UCLA (UP-2)

=== Ends ===
- Sam Morley, Stanford (AP-1; UP-1; TW)
- John Steinberg, Stanford (AP-1; UP-1; TW)
- Tom Nickoloff, USC (AP-2; UP-2)
- Myron Berliner, UCLA (AP-2)
- Ken Buck, Pacific (UP-2)

=== Tackles ===
- Charles "Chuck" Doud, UCLA (AP-1; UP-1)
- Jack Ellena, UCLA (AP-2; UP-1; TW)
- Duane Wardlow, Washington (AP-1; UP-2)
- Mario DaRe, USC (UP-2; TW)
- Dean Chambers, Washington (AP-2)

=== Guards ===
- Milt Bohart, Washington (AP-1; UP-1; TW)
- George Timberlake, USC (AP-1; UP-1; TW)
- Norman Manoogian, Stanford (AP-2)
- Jack Patera, Oregon (AP-2)
- Laverne Ferguson, Oregon St. (UP-2)
- Phil Wilson, Stanford (UP-2)

=== Centers ===
- Ron Pheister, Oregon (AP-1; UP-1; TW)
- Matt Hazeltine, California (AP-2; UP-2)

== Key ==
AP = Associated Press, selected by the AP with the cooperation of the conference coaches

UP = United Press

TW = Tide Water Associated Oil Co., selected by Tide Water Associated sportscasters, commentators and producers

== See also ==
- 1953 College Football All-America Team
