= Andrew Peasley =

American football player (born 2000)

Profile
- Position: Quarterback

Personal information
- Born: January 6, 2000 (age 26)
- Listed height: 6 ft 2 in (1.88 m)
- Listed weight: 218 lb (99 kg)

Career information
- High school: La Grande (La Grande, Oregon)
- College: Utah State (2018–2021); Wyoming (2022–2023)
- NFL draft: 2024: undrafted

Career history
- New York Jets (2024)*; Birmingham Stallions (2025)
- * Offseason or practice squad member only

Andrew Peasley (born January 6, 2000) is an American professional football quarterback. He played college football for the Utah State Aggies and Wyoming Cowboys. He also worked as a substitute teacher at La Grande High School.

== Early life ==
Peasley attended La Grande High School in La Grande, Oregon, and committed to play college football at Utah State University.

== College career ==
=== Utah State ===
As a freshman in 2018 Peasley completed three of eight passes for 19 yards and rushed for 76 yards. In 2019, he completed both of his pass attempts for five yards and rushed for 83 yards and his first career touchdown. Peasley got his first career start in week 6 of the 2020 season, where he completed 14 of 21 passing attempts for 239 yards and three touchdowns, while also rushing for 118 yards and a touchdown, in a win over New Mexico. He finished the 2020 season going 37 for 69 on his passing attempts for 391 yards and four touchdowns to three interceptions, while also rushing for 195 yards and a touchdown. In 2021 Peasley completed 28 of 51 passes for 415 yards and three touchdowns to two interceptions and rushed for 161 yards and a touchdown. After the season he entered the NCAA transfer portal.

=== Wyoming ===
Peasley transferred to Wyoming. He impressed during the 2022 Wyoming spring game as he threw for 201 yards and three touchdowns. Peasley struggled in his first career start with the Cowboys in week zero of the 2022 season, where he completed five of 20 passes for 30 yards and an interception in a 38-6 loss to Illinois. He bounced back the following week as he completed 20 of 30 passing attempts for 256 yards and two touchdowns in a win over Tulsa. Peasley finished the 2022 season going 144 for 275 on his passes for 1,574 yards and ten touchdowns to nine interceptions. He also rushed for 339 yards and two touchdowns. In week one of the 2023 season, where Peasley threw for 149 yards and two touchdowns, while also rushing for 68 yards and a touchdown, as he helped Wyoming upset Texas Tech. The following week, Peasley went 11 for 16 on pass attempts for 201 yards and career-high three touchdowns with an interception in a win over Portland State.

=== Statistics ===
Year	Team	Games			Passing								Rushing			
Year	Team	GP	GS	Record	Cmp	Att	Pct	Yds	Avg	TD	Int	Rtg	Att	Yds	Avg	TD
2018	Utah State	3	0	—	3	8	37.5	19	2.4	0	0	57.5	7	76	10.9	0
2019	Utah State	1	0	—	2	2	100.0	5	2.5	0	0	121.0	3	83	27.7	1
2020	Utah State	5	2	1−1	37	69	53.6	391	5.7	4	3	111.7	22	195	8.9	1
2021	Utah State	10	0	—	28	51	54.9	415	8.1	3	2	134.8	25	161	6.4	1
2022	Wyoming	12	12	7−5	144	275	52.4	1,574	5.7	10	9	105.9	81	339	4.2	2
2023	Wyoming	12	12	9−3	166	266	62.4	1,991	7.5	20	5	146.3	110	419	3.8	7
Career		43	26	17−9	380	671	56.6	4,395	6.5	37	19	124.2	248	1,273	5.1	12

== Professional career ==
Pre-draft measurables
Height	Weight	Arm length	Hand span	40-yard dash	10-yard split	20-yard split	20-yard shuttle	Three-cone drill	Vertical jump	Broad jump
6 ft 1 3/4 in (1.87 m)	216 lb (98 kg)	32 1/8 in (0.82 m)	9 1/4 in (0.23 m)	4.65 s	1.66 s	2.70 s	4.33 s	7.00 s	37 in (0.94 m)	10 ft 6 in (3.20 m)
All values from Pro Day

=== New York Jets ===
On May 6, 2024, Peasley signed with the New York Jets as an undrafted free agent. He was waived on August 27.

=== Birmingham Stallions ===
On April 9, 2025, Peasley signed with the Birmingham Stallions of the United Football League (UFL).

== UFL career statistics ==
Year	Team	Games			Passing									Rushing				
Year	Team	GP	GS	Record	Cmp	Att	Pct	Yds	Y/A	Lng	TD	Int	Rtg	Att	Yds	Avg	Lng	TD
2025	BHAM	2	0	—	14	22	63.6	172	7.8	28	0	0	87.7	4	32	9.0	16	0
Career		2	0	0–0	14	22	63.6	172	7.8	28	0	0	87.7	4	32	9.0	16	0

== Personal life ==
Peasley is married to his wife Maia, and they have 2 sons together.
