= Joe Zombek =

American football player (1932–1996)

No. 82, 85
- Positions: Defensive end, punter

Personal information
- Born: December 24, 1932; Carnegie, Pennsylvania, U.S.
- Died: January 13, 1996 (aged 63); McDonald, Pennsylvania, U.S.
- Listed height: 6 ft 1 in (1.85 m)
- Listed weight: 195 lb (88 kg)

Career information
- High school: Clark (PA)
- College: Pittsburgh
- NFL draft: 1954: 9th round, 103rd overall pick

Career history
- Pittsburgh Steelers (1954–1955)

Awards and highlights
- Western Chapter of Pennsylvania Sports Hall of Fame (1987)

Career NFL statistics
- Punts: 5
- Punt yards: 201
- Longest punt: 45
- Stats at Pro Football Reference

Joseph A. Zombek (December 24, 1932 – January 13, 1996) was an American professional football player who was a defensive end and punter for two seasons in the National Football League (NFL) with the Pittsburgh Steelers. He played college football for the Pittsburgh Panthers, and was selected by the Steelers in the ninth round of the 1954 NFL draft.

== Early life and education ==
Zombek was born on December 24, 1932, in Carnegie, Pennsylvania. He attended Clark High School in Scott Township, and was an all-state performer in football as a senior in 1949. He enrolled at the University of Pittsburgh in 1950, where he was a three-year letterman in football. He majored in geography.

A profile of Zombek in The Pittsburgh Press wrote of him: "A happy-go-lucky lad who likes to tinker with cars in his spare time, he permits no friendships once he takes the field. His charge makes up for lack of heft. He tips the scale at 185 and is a deadly tackler."

== Professional career ==
After finishing his senior season of college, Zombek was selected by the Pittsburgh Steelers of the National Football League (NFL), in the 9th round (103rd overall) of the 1954 NFL draft.

Zombek was the final player released in roster cuts. Coach Walt Kiesling said that the final cut had come down to either Zombek or Ernie Cheatham, and kept Cheatham. After receiving film of Zombek the next day, Kielsing "knew he had cut the wrong man." "We had to cut by Tuesday," said coach Kiesling, "and we made a cut in the blind. When we saw the movies we realized we made a mistake." However, due to league rules, he was not eligible to be re-signed until 30 days after the release. After an injury to Bill McPeak, Zombek came back to the team for their game with the Philadelphia Eagles.

Zombek finished the season having played in eight games, one as a starter. He returned to Pittsburgh for the 1955 season, and changed his position to punter. He played in one game, at both end and punter, before being released.

== Later life and death ==
Zombek later was a salesman and manager at Jessop Steel Co. from 1956 to 1967, and was the owner of the Cherry Hills Inn and Resort in McDonald, Pennsylvania, from 1964 to until at least 1987.

Zombek was inducted into the Western Chapter of Pennsylvania Sports Hall of Fame in 1987.
