= 1952 Western Reserve Red Cats football team =

American college football season

1952 Western Reserve Red Cats football
- Conference: Mid-American Conference
- Record: 5–4 (1–4 MAC)
- Head coach: Edward L. Finnigan (2nd season)
- Home stadium: Clarke Field

1952 Mid-American Conference football standings
	Conf.					Overall
Team	W		L		T	W		L		T
Cincinnati $	3	–	0	–	0	8	–	1	–	1
Miami (OH)	4	–	1	–	0	8	–	1	–	0
Ohio	5	–	2	–	0	6	–	2	–	2
Bowling Green	2	–	2	–	0	7	–	2	–	0
Kent State	2	–	2	–	0	5	–	4	–	0
Western Michigan	1	–	4	–	0	4	–	4	–	0
Western Reserve	1	–	4	–	0	5	–	4	–	0
Toledo	1	–	4	–	0	4	–	5	–	0
$ – Conference champion

The 1952 Western Reserve Red Cats football team represented the Western Reserve University—now known as Case Western Reserve University—as a member of the Mid-American Conference (MAC) during the 1952 college football season. Led by second-year head coach Edward L. Finnigan, the Red Cats compiled an overall record of 5–4 with a mark of 1–4 in conference play, placing in a three-way tie for sixth in the MAC. Wes Stevens and George Roman served as assistant coaches for the team.

== Schedule ==
Date	Time	Opponent	Site	Result	Attendance	Source
September 27		at Toledo	Glass Bowl; Toledo, OH	L 9–10		
October 3		at Kent State	Memorial Stadium; Kent, OH	L 19–25	5,100	
October 11		Ohio	Clarke Field; Cleveland, OH	L 7–22		
October 18	3:00 p.m.	at Washington University*	Francis Field; St. Louis, MO	W 20–16	3,000	
October 25		Buffalo*	Clarke Field; Cleveland, OH	W 35–13	5,117	
November 1		Cincinnati	Clarke Field; Cleveland, OH	L 2–41		
November 8		at Western Michigan	Waldo Stadium; Kalamazoo, MI	W 16–13		
November 15		Butler*	Clarke Field; Cleveland, OH	W 42–14		
November 27		Case Tech*	Clarke Field; Cleveland, OH	W 48–7		
*Non-conference game; All times are in Eastern time
