= Matt Hazeltine =

American football player (1933–1987)

- Hazeltine in 1961

No. 55, 64
- Position: Linebacker

Personal information
- Born: August 2, 1933; Ross, California, U.S.
- Died: January 13, 1987 (aged 53); San Francisco, California, U.S.
- Listed height: 6 ft 1 in (1.85 m)
- Listed weight: 220 lb (100 kg)

Career information
- High school: Tamalpais (Mill Valley, California)
- College: California (1951–1954)
- NFL draft: 1955: 4th round, 45th overall pick

Career history

Playing
- San Francisco 49ers (1955–1968); New York Giants (1970)

Coaching
- New York Giants (1972–1973) Linebackers coach; The Hawaiians (1974) Secondary coach

Awards and highlights
- 2× Second-team All-Pro (1962, 1964); 2× Pro Bowl (1962, 1964); 2× First-team All-American (1953, 1954); Second-team All-PCC (1953)

Career NFL statistics
- Interceptions: 13
- Fumble recoveries: 18
- Total touchdowns: 3
- Sacks: 39
- Stats at Pro Football Reference
- College Football Hall of Fame

Matthew Emory Hazeltine, Jr. (August 2, 1933 – January 13, 1987) was an American professional football player who was a linebacker for 15 seasons in the National Football League (NFL) with the San Francisco 49ers and New York Giants.

Hazeltine was twice an All-American as a collegian playing for the University of California and was twice chosen for the Pro Bowl during his professional career. He is a member of the College Football Hall of Fame.

== Early life ==
Matt Hazeltine was born August 2, 1933 in Ross, California, located in Marin County, just north of San Francisco. He was a 1951 graduate of Tamalpais High School in Mill Valley, California, where he was a star football player at linebacker. Hazeltine's father, Matt Sr., played on the University of California's rugby team in 1914, and football team in 1915.

== College football ==
Hazeltine attended the University of California, Berkeley (Cal), where he played football under coach Pappy Waldorf as a linebacker and center (1951-54); and also played rugby. He was a football All-American as a freshman in 1951 (freshmen being eligible for varsity football because of the Korean War). His first start came at center, in the last week of his freshman season, and he started through the remainder of his college career. He was a first-team All-American at center in 1953 and 1954, All-Pacific Coast Conference in 1953-54, and team captain in 1954. At the time he graduated, his 10 career interceptions were second most in Cal history.

He was inducted into the University of California Athletics Hall of Fame in 1988. Hazeltine was elected to the College Football Hall of Fame in 1989.

== Professional career ==
The San Francisco 49ers selected Hazeltine in the fourth round of the 1955 NFL draft, 45th overall. As a rookie, he started all 12 49er games at left linebacker, and remained a starting linebacker with the team for the next 13 years. His only playoff appearance came in 1957, as the starting left linebacker in the 49ers divisional round loss to Tobin Rote and the Detroit Lions, 31–27. Two years later, he received his first game ball when he sacked Rote three times in a 33–7 victory over the Lions.

While with the 49ers, Hazeltine was selected for the Pro Bowl twice, in 1962 and 1964. In 1962, he had two interceptions, a fumble recovery and 3.5 sacks. In 1964, he had one interception, one fumble recovery, and a career high 11.5 sacks. He was named second-team All-Pro in 1962 and 1964 by the Associated Press (AP), Newspaper Enterprise Association (NEA) and United Press International (UPI). He was captain of the team for five years.

Hazeltine had three defensive touchdowns in his career, one on an interception and two on fumble recoveries. In a 1958 game against the Baltimore Colts, he intercepted a Johnny Unitas pass and returned it 13 yards for a touchdown. In another 1959 game against the Lions, he took a fumble recovery 40 yards for a touchdown; and in a 1966 game against the Green Bay Packers, he forced quarterback Bart Starr to fumble, recovered the ball, and ran 22 yards for a touchdown in the 49ers upset victory over the team that would become the first Super Bowl champions.

1968 was Hazeltine’s final year in San Francisco. He missed the 1969 season with injuries. He had retired to focus on insurance and broadcasting interests, and did not play in 1969, but former teammate Y. A. Tittle talked him out of retirement and Hazeltine returned in 1970 for one season with the New York Giants. At 37 years old, he won a game ball in an October 18, 1970 shutout of the Boston Patriots. He started all 14 games, with one interception, two fumble recoveries and a sack. The Giants went 9–5, their first winning season since 1963.

== Life after football ==
Following his retirement from the gridiron, Hazeltine operated a successful insurance agency in San Francisco.

== Death and legacy ==
Hazeltine died in San Francisco on January 13, 1987 of amyotrophic lateral sclerosis (ALS), also known as Lou Gehrig's Disease. He was one of three 1964 San Francisco 49ers teammates who died of ALS, a rare ailment with an incidence estimated at 1 per 50,000 individuals in the general population. Others 49ers felled by the terminal disease included contemporaries Bob Waters and Gary Lewis and — a generation later — wide receiver Dwight Clark.

Studies have been done examining the use of DMSO, painkillers, and the fertilizer used on the 49ers practice field in Redwood City, California in an effort to isolate a potential chemical connection. A possible connection between the disease and mild traumatic brain injury (concussion) is a matter of ongoing study.

After Hazeltine's death, the 49ers and Bill Walsh established the Hazeltine Iron Man Award, presented annually to the most courageous and inspirational 49ers defensive player.

== See also ==
- 1954 College Football All-America Team
