= 1952 Miami Redskins football team =

American college football season

1952 Miami Redskins football
- Conference: Mid-American Conference
- Record: 8–1 (4–1 MAC)
- Head coach: Ara Parseghian (2nd season)
- Captain: John McVay
- Home stadium: Miami Field

1952 Mid-American Conference football standings
	Conf.					Overall
Team	W		L		T	W		L		T
Cincinnati $	3	–	0	–	0	8	–	1	–	1
Miami (OH)	4	–	1	–	0	8	–	1	–	0
Ohio	5	–	2	–	0	6	–	2	–	2
Bowling Green	2	–	2	–	0	7	–	2	–	0
Kent State	2	–	2	–	0	5	–	4	–	0
Western Michigan	1	–	4	–	0	4	–	4	–	0
Western Reserve	1	–	4	–	0	5	–	4	–	0
Toledo	1	–	4	–	0	4	–	5	–	0
$ – Conference champion

The 1952 Miami Redskins football team was an American football team that represented Miami University in the Mid-American Conference (MAC) during the 1952 college football season. In its second season under head coach Ara Parseghian, Miami compiled an 8–1 record (4–1 against MAC opponents), finished in second place in the MAC, held five of nine opponents to seven points or less, and outscored all opponents by a combined total of 284 to 108.

John McVay was the team captain. The team's statistical leaders included Tom Pagna with 1,064 rushing yards, Jim Root with 1,056 passing yards, and Clive Rush with 298 receiving yards.

== Schedule ==
Date	Opponent	Site	Result	Attendance	Source
September 27	at Bowling Green	University Stadium; Bowling Green, OH	W 42–7	4,200	
October 4	Xavier*	Miami Field; Oxford, OH	W 26–7	11,050	
October 11	Western Michigan	Miami Field; Oxford, OH	W 55–6		
October 18	at Wichita*	Veterans Field; Wichita, KS	W 56–7		
October 25	at Ohio	Peden Stadium; Athens, OH (rivalry)	W 20–0		
November 1	Toledo	Miami Field; Oxford, OH	W 27–13		
November 7	at Marquette*	Marquette Stadium; Milwaukee, WI	W 22–21		
November 15	Dayton*	Miami Field; Oxford, OH	W 27–13		
November 27	at Cincinnati*	Nippert Stadium; Cincinnati, OH (Victory Bell)	L 9–34		
*Non-conference game
