= Glenn Holtzman =

American football player (1930–1980)

No. 79, 89
- Positions: Defensive tackle, offensive tackle

Personal information
- Born: October 9, 1930; Shreveport, Louisiana, U.S.
- Died: May 6, 1980 (aged 49); Reno, Nevada, U.S.
- Listed height: 6 ft 3 in (1.91 m)
- Listed weight: 250 lb (113 kg)

Career information
- High school: Denton (Denton, Texas)
- College: North Texas
- NFL draft: 1954: 26th round, 310th overall pick

Career history
- Los Angeles Rams (1955–1958); Los Angeles Chargers (1960); Oakland Raiders (1960)*
- * Offseason or practice squad member only

Career NFL statistics
- Games played\: 48
- Games started: 28
- Fumble recoveries: 3
- Safeties: 1
- Stats at Pro Football Reference

Glenn D. Holtzman (October 9, 1930 – May 6, 1980) was an American professional football defensive tackle in the National Football League (NFL). He played four seasons for the Los Angeles Rams from 1955 to 1958.

== Biography ==
Holtzman was born in Shreveport, Louisiana, and attended high school in Denton, Texas. He played college football at Kilgore Junior College and North Texas State, interrupted by a year in Germany with the United States Army.

Holtzman was drafted in the 26th round by the National Football League in 1954. He played for the Los Angeles Rams from 1955 to 1958. In 1959 he was one of the four Rams linemen offered by the Los Angeles Rams in a trade for Chicago Cardinals star Ollie Matson. In 1960 he played briefly for the Los Angeles Chargers.

After his sports career, Holtzman sold real estate, managed a nightclub, coached football, and became a character actor. He had roles on television westerns, and played the sheriff in a national touring company of Tommy Tune's The Best Little Whorehouse in Texas. He died from an apparent heart attack in 1980, at age 49, in Reno, Nevada.
