= George Rosso =

American football player (1930–1994)

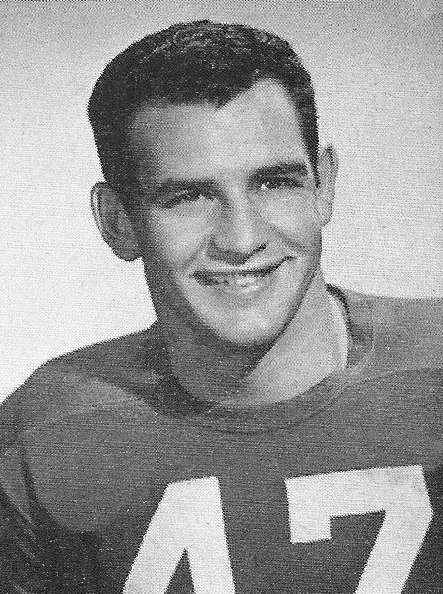

No. 20
- Position: Defensive back

Personal information
- Born: January 15, 1930; Pittsburgh, Pennsylvania, U.S.
- Died: January 28, 1994 (aged 64); Columbus, Ohio, U.S.
- Listed height: 5 ft 11 in (1.80 m)
- Listed weight: 177 lb (80 kg)

Career information
- High school: Langley High School; The Kiski School
- College: Ohio State
- NFL draft: 1954: 25th round, 296th overall pick

Career history
- Washington Redskins (1954)

Career NFL statistics
- Interceptions: 4
- Return yards: 15
- Stats at Pro Football Reference

George Anthony Rosso (January 15, 1930 – January 28, 1994) was an American professional football defensive back in the National Football League (NFL) for the Washington Redskins. He played college football at Ohio State University and was drafted in the 25th round of the 1954 NFL draft.

== Early life ==
Rosso was born to a football family. His brothers Tony and Mike played for Washington & Jefferson, while Don also played football before joining the Army.

In his high school years at Kiski, he played at right halfback because he was left-handed.

== College career ==
Rosso considered entering West Point, but decided to enter Ohio State.

== Professional career ==
Rosso was drafted 296th overall in the 25th round by the Washington Redskins during the 1954 NFL Draft.

== Illness, death and interment ==
Rosso died from cancer-related complications at the OhioHealth Riverside Methodist Hospital in Columbus, Ohio on January 28, 1994. Following a funeral mass at Our Lady of Victory Catholic Church on February 1, he was buried at Resurrection Cemetery.
