= Pete Mangum =

American gridiron football player (1931–2000)

No. 51, 33, 45, 43, 83
- Position: Linebacker

Personal information
- Born: January 17, 1931; Forest, Louisiana, U.S.
- Died: March 17, 2000 (aged 69)
- Listed height: 6 ft 0 in (1.83 m)
- Listed weight: 219 lb (99 kg)

Career information
- High school: Rolling Fork (MS)
- College: Ole Miss (1950–1953)
- NFL draft: 1954: 23rd round, 268th overall pick

Career history
- New York Giants (1954); Winnipeg Blue Bombers (1957–1958); Denver Broncos (1960)
- Stats at Pro Football Reference

Ernest "Pete" Glynde Mangum (January 17, 1931 – March 17, 2000) was an American professional football linebacker who played for the New York Giants and Denver Broncos of the National Football League (NFL) in 1954 and 1960, respectively, as well as for the Winnipeg Blue Bombers of the Canadian Football League (CFL) from 1957 to 1958, after New York traded his rights for quarterback Chuck Curtis. Mangum played 2 games in 1954 and 14 in 1960. His career was interrupted by a stint in the army, and during the football offseason he worked as supervisor of recreation at Angola Prison. After his playing career, Mangum worked as a coach for several different high schools and Northeast Louisiana University, and was the general manager for the Houston Texans of the World Football League (WFL).
