= 1953 Western Reserve Red Cats football team =

American college football season

1953 Western Reserve Red Cats football
- Conference: Mid-American Conference
- Record: 5–3–1 (1–2–1 MAC)
- Head coach: Edward L. Finnigan (3rd season)
- Captain: Gordon McCarter
- Home stadium: Clarke Field

1953 Mid-American Conference football standings
	Conf.					Overall
Team	W		L		T	W		L		T
Ohio $	5	–	0	–	1	6	–	2	–	1
Miami (OH)	3	–	0	–	1	7	–	1	–	1
Kent State	3	–	1	–	0	7	–	2	–	0
Toledo	2	–	3	–	0	3	–	6	–	0
Western Reserve	1	–	2	–	1	5	–	3	–	1
Western Michigan	0	–	4	–	1	1	–	6	–	1
Bowling Green	0	–	4	–	0	1	–	8	–	0
$ – Conference champion

The 1953 Western Reserve Red Cats football team represented the Western Reserve University—now referred to as Case Western Reserve University—as a member of the Mid-American Conference (MAC) during the 1953 college football season. Led by third-year head coach Edward L. Finnigan, the Red Cats compiled an overall record of 5–3–1 with a mark of 1–2–1 in conference play, placing fifth in the MAC. Fullback Gordon McCarter was the team's captain. Wes Stevens served as line coach.

The final Thanksgiving Day rivalry game against Case Tech was played this season.

== Schedule ==
Date	Time	Opponent	Site	Result	Attendance	Source
September 26		Toledo	Clarke Field; Cleveland, OH	W 21–20		
October 3		Kent State	Clarke Field; Cleveland, OH	L 0–27		
October 10		at Ohio	Peden Stadium; Athens, OH	L 0–39		
October 17		at Buffalo*	Civic Stadium; Buffalo, NY	W 26–6	4,823	
October 24		at Cincinnati*	Nippert Stadium; Cincinnati, OH	L 0–66		
October 31	2:00 p.m.	Washington University*	Clarke Field; Cleveland, OH	W 20–14	5,000	
November 7		Western Michigan	Clarke Field; Cleveland, OH	T 14–14	< 200	
November 14		at Butler*	Butler Bowl; Indianapolis, IN	W 21–20	5,000	
November 26		Case Tech*	Clarke Field; Cleveland, OH	W 35–19	7,500	
*Non-conference game; All times are in Eastern time
