= 1953 Miami Redskins football team =

American college football season

1953 Miami Redskins football
- Conference: Mid-American Conference
- Record: 7–1–1 (3–0–1 MAC)
- Head coach: Ara Parseghian (3rd season)
- Captain: Tom Pagna
- Home stadium: Miami Field

1953 Mid-American Conference football standings
	Conf.					Overall
Team	W		L		T	W		L		T
Ohio $	5	–	0	–	1	6	–	2	–	1
Miami (OH)	3	–	0	–	1	7	–	1	–	1
Kent State	3	–	1	–	0	7	–	2	–	0
Toledo	2	–	3	–	0	3	–	6	–	0
Western Reserve	1	–	2	–	1	5	–	3	–	1
Western Michigan	0	–	4	–	1	1	–	6	–	1
Bowling Green	0	–	4	–	0	1	–	8	–	0
$ – Conference champion

The 1953 Miami Redskins football team was an American football team that represented Miami University in the Mid-American Conference (MAC) during the 1953 college football season. In its third season under head coach Ara Parseghian, Miami compiled a 7–1–1 record (3–0–1 against MAC opponents), finished in second place in the MAC, held eight of nine opponents to seven points or less, and outscored all opponents by a combined total of 327 to 52.

Tom Pagna was the team captain. The team's statistical leaders included Tom Pagna with 706 rushing yards, Dick Hunter with 626 passing yards, and Jay Ansel with 184 receiving yards.

== Schedule ==
Date	Opponent	Site	Result	Attendance	Source
September 26	Bowling Green	Miami Field; Oxford, OH	W 47–0	9,000	
October 3	Xavier*	Miami Field; Oxford, OH	W 28–6	10,000	
October 10	at Western Michigan	Waldo Stadium; Kalamazoo, MI	W 52–6		
October 17	at Marshall*	Fairfield Stadium; Huntington, WV	W 48–6		
October 24	Ohio	Miami Field; Oxford, OH (rivalry)	T 7–7		
October 31	at Toledo	Glass Bowl; Toledo, OH	W 81–0		
November 7	Tennessee Tech*	Miami Field; Oxford, OH	W 44–6		
November 14	at Dayton*	University of Dayton Stadium; Dayton, OH	W 20–7	8,500	
November 26	Cincinnati*	Miami Field; Oxford, OH (Victory Bell)	L 0–14	26,000	
*Non-conference game
