= 1953 Ohio Bobcats football team =

American college football season

1953 Ohio Bobcats football

MAC champion
- Conference: Mid-American Conference
- Record: 6–2–1 (5–0–1 MAC)
- Head coach: Carroll Widdoes (5th season)
- Home stadium: Peden Stadium

1953 Mid-American Conference football standings
	Conf.					Overall
Team	W		L		T	W		L		T
Ohio $	5	–	0	–	1	6	–	2	–	1
Miami (OH)	3	–	0	–	1	7	–	1	–	1
Kent State	3	–	1	–	0	7	–	2	–	0
Toledo	2	–	3	–	0	3	–	6	–	0
Western Reserve	1	–	2	–	1	5	–	3	–	1
Western Michigan	0	–	4	–	1	1	–	6	–	1
Bowling Green	0	–	4	–	0	1	–	8	–	0
$ – Conference champion

The 1953 Ohio Bobcats football team was an American football team that represented Ohio University in the Mid-American Conference (MAC) during the 1953 college football season. In their fifth season under head coach Carroll Widdoes, the Bobcats won the MAC championship, compiled a 6–2–1 record (5–0–1 against MAC opponents), and outscored all opponents by a combined total of 245 to 86. They played their home games in Peden Stadium in Athens, Ohio.

The team's statistical leaders included Tom Ascani with 537 rushing yards, Bill Frederick with 627 passing yards, and Lou Sawchik with 511 receiving yards and seven touchdowns.

== Schedule ==
Date	Opponent	Site	Result	Attendance	Source
September 19	at Toledo	Glass Bowl; Toledo, OH	W 26–0		
October 3	at Harvard*	Harvard Stadium; Boston, MA	L 0–16	14,500	
October 10	Western Reserve	Peden Stadium; Athens, OH	W 39–0		
October 17	Kent State	Peden Stadium; Athens, OH	W 40–21	10,417	
October 24	at Miami (OH)	Miami Field; Oxford, OH (rivalry)	T 7–7		
October 31	at Western Michigan	Waldo Stadium; Kalamazoo, MI	W 67–12		
November 7	Morris Harvey*	Peden Stadium; Athens, OH	W 38–7		
November 14	Bowling Green	Peden Stadium; Athens, OH	W 22–14	4,500	
November 21	at Marshall*	Fairfield Stadium; Huntington, WV (rivalry)	L 6–9	3,000	
*Non-conference game
