= Don Miller (American football, born 1932) =

American football player (born 1932)

No. 20, 46
- Position: Halfback

Personal information
- Born: May 24, 1932 (age 94); Houston, Texas, U.S.
- Listed height: 6 ft 2 in (1.88 m)
- Listed weight: 195 lb (88 kg)

Career information
- College: SMU
- NFL draft: 1954: 7th round, 84th overall pick

Career history
- Green Bay Packers (1954); Philadelphia Eagles (1954)
- Stats at Pro Football Reference

Donald Allen Miller Jr. (born Don Jack Miller) is a former halfback in the National Football League (NFL). He was a member of the Green Bay Packers and the Philadelphia Eagles.
