= Ken Panfil =

American football player (1930–2002)

No. 73, 74
- Position: Offensive tackle

Personal information
- Born: September 16, 1930; Chicago, Illinois, U.S.
- Died: April 28, 2002 (aged 71); Palos Heights, Illinois, U.S.
- Listed height: 6 ft 6 in (1.98 m)
- Listed weight: 262 lb (119 kg)

Career information
- High school: Gage Park (Chicago)
- College: Purdue (1950–1952, 1955)
- NFL draft: 1954: 6th round, 70th overall pick

Career history
- Los Angeles Rams (1956–1958); Chicago / St. Louis Cardinals (1959–1962)

Awards and highlights
- Pro Bowl (1959)

Career NFL statistics
- Games played: 58
- Games started: 44
- Fumble recoveries: 5
- Stats at Pro Football Reference

Ken Panfil (September 16, 1930 – April 28, 2002) was an American professional football player who was an offensive tackle who played seven seasons in the National Football League (NFL) with the Los Angeles Rams and Chicago/St. Louis Cardinals. He played college football for the Purdue Boilermakers.
