= 1953 Bowling Green Falcons football team =

American college football season

1953 Bowling Green Falcons football
- Conference: Mid-American Conference
- Record: 1–8 (0–4 MAC)
- Head coach: Robert Whittaker (13th season)
- MVP: Bill Bradshaw
- Captain: Jim Ladd
- Home stadium: University Stadium

1953 Mid-American Conference football standings
| | Conf. | | | | | Overall |
| Team | W | | L | | T | W | | L | | T |
|---|---|---|---|---|---|---|---|---|---|---|
| Ohio $ | 5 | – | 0 | – | 1 | 6 | – | 2 | – | 1 |
| Miami (OH) | 3 | – | 0 | – | 1 | 7 | – | 1 | – | 1 |
| Kent State | 3 | – | 1 | – | 0 | 7 | – | 2 | – | 0 |
| Toledo | 2 | – | 3 | – | 0 | 3 | – | 6 | – | 0 |
| Western Reserve | 1 | – | 2 | – | 1 | 5 | – | 3 | – | 1 |
| Western Michigan | 0 | – | 4 | – | 1 | 1 | – | 6 | – | 1 |
| Bowling Green | 0 | – | 4 | – | 0 | 1 | – | 8 | – | 0 |
$ – Conference champion

The 1953 Bowling Green Falcons football team was an American football team that represented Bowling Green State University in the Mid-American Conference (MAC) during the 1953 college football season. In their 13th season under head coach Robert Whittaker, the Falcons compiled a 1–8 record (0–4 against MAC opponents), finished in last place in the MAC, and were outscored by all opponents by a combined total of 252 to 119.

The team's statistical leaders were Bill Bradshaw with 865 passing yards and 236 rushing yards, and Jim Ladd with 473 receiving yards. Ladd was also the team captain. Bill Bradshaw received the team's Most Valuable Player award.

== Schedule ==
| Date | Opponent | Site | Result | Attendance | Source |
|---|---|---|---|---|---|
| September 18 | at Youngstown* | Rayen Stadium; Youngstown, OH | L 7–20 | | |
| September 26 | at Miami (OH) | Miami Field; Oxford, OH | L 0–47 | 9,000 | |
| October 2 | at Temple* | Temple Stadium; Philadelphia, PA | L 0–27 | 5,000 | |
| October 10 | Bradley* | University Stadium; Bowling Green, OH | W 39–13 | | |
| October 17 | at Baldwin–Wallace* | Berea, OH | L 27–35 | | |
| October 24 | Toledo | University Stadium; Bowling Green, OH (rivalry) | L 19–20 | | |
| October 31 | Kent State | University Stadium; Bowling Green, OH (rivalry) | L 7–41 | | |
| November 7 | Heidelberg* | University Stadium; Bowling Green, OH | L 6–27 | | |
| November 14 | at Ohio | Peden Stadium; Athens, OH | L 14–22 | | |
*Non-conference game
