= Richard Kaser =

Canadian football player (born 1933)

Profile
- Positions: End, Halfback

Personal information
- Born: c. 1933; Cuyahoga Falls, Ohio, U.S.
- Listed height: 6 ft 0 in (1.83 m)
- Listed weight: 173 lb (78 kg)

Career history
- 1955: BC Lions
- 1956–1961: Ottawa Rough Riders

Awards and highlights
- Grey Cup champion (1960)

Richard Kaser (born c. 1933) was an American professional football player who played for the BC Lions and Ottawa Rough Riders. He won the Grey Cup with Ottawa in 1960. He played college football for the University of Toledo.
