= 1952 Cincinnati Bearcats football team =

American college football season

1952 Cincinnati Bearcats football

MAC champion
- Conference: Mid-American Conference
- Record: 8–1–1 (3–0 MAC)
- Head coach: Sid Gillman (4th season)
- Captain: Glenn Sample
- Home stadium: Nippert Stadium

1952 Mid-American Conference football standings
| | Conf. | | | | | Overall |
| Team | W | | L | | T | W | | L | | T |
|---|---|---|---|---|---|---|---|---|---|---|
| Cincinnati $ | 3 | – | 0 | – | 0 | 8 | – | 1 | – | 1 |
| Miami (OH) | 4 | – | 1 | – | 0 | 8 | – | 1 | – | 0 |
| Ohio | 5 | – | 2 | – | 0 | 6 | – | 2 | – | 2 |
| Bowling Green | 2 | – | 2 | – | 0 | 7 | – | 2 | – | 0 |
| Kent State | 2 | – | 2 | – | 0 | 5 | – | 4 | – | 0 |
| Western Michigan | 1 | – | 4 | – | 0 | 4 | – | 4 | – | 0 |
| Western Reserve | 1 | – | 4 | – | 0 | 5 | – | 4 | – | 0 |
| Toledo | 1 | – | 4 | – | 0 | 4 | – | 5 | – | 0 |
$ – Conference champion

The 1952 Cincinnati Bearcats football team was an American football team that represented the University of Cincinnati as a member of the Mid-American Conference (MAC) during the 1952 college football season. The Bearcats were led by head coach Sid Gillman and compiled a 8–1–1 record and were named MAC Champions.

== Schedule ==
| Date | Opponent | Site | Result | Attendance | Source |
|---|---|---|---|---|---|
| September 20 | Dayton* | Nippert Stadium; Cincinnati, OH | W 25–0 | 25,000 | |
| September 27 | Kansas State* | Nippert Stadium; Cincinnati, OH | W 13–6 | | |
| October 4 | at Tulsa* | Skelly Stadium; Tulsa, OK | T 14–14 | 17,500 | |
| October 11 | Xavier* | Nippert Stadium; Cincinnati, OH (rivalry) | W 20–13 | 27,000 | |
| October 18 | Wabash* | Nippert Stadium; Cincinnati, OH | W 27–7 | | |
| October 25 | Kentucky* | Nippert Stadium; Cincinnati, OH | L 6–14 | 27,000 | |
| November 1 | at Western Reserve | Clarke Field; Cleveland, OH | W 41–2 | | |
| November 8 | Ohio^{†} | Nippert Stadium; Cincinnati, OH | W 41–7 | | |
| November 15 | Washington and Lee* | Nippert Stadium; Cincinnati, OH | W 54–0 | | |
| November 27 | Miami (OH) | Nippert Stadium; Cincinnati, OH (Victory Bell) | W 34–9 | | |
*Non-conference game; ^{†}Homecoming
