= Kenneth Cochrane =

American football player and coach (1908–1998)

Biographical details
- Born: March 31, 1908; Glasgow, Scotland
- Died: November 24, 1998 (aged 90); Stuart, Florida, U.S.

Playing career
- 1928–1930: Akron
- Position: Halfback

Coaching career (HC unless noted)
- 1952–1953: Akron

Administrative career (AD unless noted)
- 1948–1969: Akron

Head coaching record
- Overall: 8–9–1

Kenneth "Red" Cochrane (March 31, 1908 – November 24, 1998) was an American college football player, coach, and athletics administrator. He served as the head football coach at the University of Akron in Akron, Ohio, from 1952 to 1953. As athletic director at Akron in 1950, Cochrane shortened the school's athletic nickname from "Zippers" to "Zips". Cochrane was born in Glasgow, Scotland. He died on November 24, 1998, in Stuart, Florida, at the age of 90. He played football at Akron from 1928 to 1930.

== Head coaching record ==
Year	Team	Overall	Conference	Standing	Bowl/playoffs
Akron Zips (Ohio Athletic Conference) (1952–1953)
1952	Akron	2–6–1	2–2–1	T–6th	
1953	Akron	6–3	4–2	T–4th	
Akron:		8–9–1	6–4–1		
Total:		8–9–1			
