= La Grande High School =

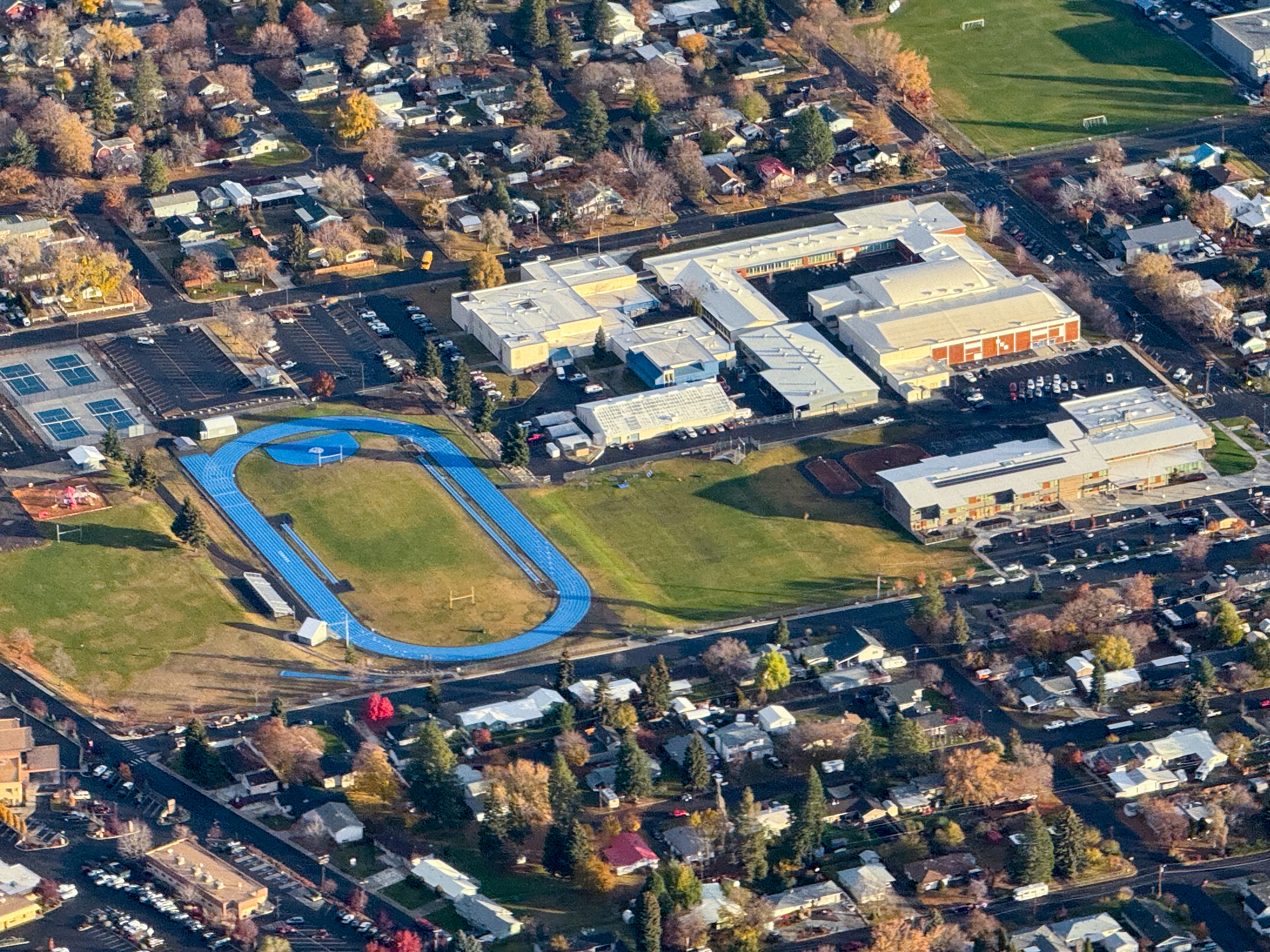

Location
- 708 K Avenue; La Grande, Oregon 97850; United States; 45.321°N 118.101°W

Information
- Type: Public
- School district: La Grande School District
- Superintendent: George Mendoza
- NCES School ID: 410720001131
- Principal: Chelsea Hurliman
- Teaching staff: 32.00 (FTE)
- Grades: 9-12
- Enrollment: 628 (2023–2024)
- Student to teacher ratio: 19.62
- Colors: Blue and white
- Athletics conference: OSAA Greater Oregon League 4A-7
- Mascot: Tiger
- Rival: Baker Bulldogs
- Yearbook: MIMIR
- Website: lhs.lagrandesd.org

La Grande High School is a public high school in the western United States, located in La Grande, Oregon.

== Academics ==
In 2008, 81% of the school's seniors received a high school diploma. Of 197 students, 159 graduated, 29 dropped out, and nine were still in high school in 2009.

== Notable people ==
=== Students ===
Jadin Bell, a 15-year-old student and member of the school's cheerleading squad, committed suicide in early 2013 after a period of intense bullying by other students. There are indications of failure on the part of local authorities to effectively address the bullying. The story, and that of Bell's legacy, was made into a movie featuring Mark Wahlberg.

=== Alumni ===
- Wayne Berry, former NFL halfback for the New York Giants
- Andrew Peasley, quarterback for the New York Jets, played college football for the Utah State Aggies and the Wyoming Cowboys
- Bucky Buckwalter, professional basketball player, coach, and executive
