= 1953 Kent State Golden Flashes football team =

American college football season

1953 Kent State Golden Flashes football
- Conference: Mid-American Conference
- Record: 7–2 (3–1 MAC)
- Head coach: Trevor J. Rees (8th season)
- Home stadium: Memorial Stadium

1953 Mid-American Conference football standings
	Conf.					Overall
Team	W		L		T	W		L		T
Ohio $	5	–	0	–	1	6	–	2	–	1
Miami (OH)	3	–	0	–	1	7	–	1	–	1
Kent State	3	–	1	–	0	7	–	2	–	0
Toledo	2	–	3	–	0	3	–	6	–	0
Western Reserve	1	–	2	–	1	5	–	3	–	1
Western Michigan	0	–	4	–	1	1	–	6	–	1
Bowling Green	0	–	4	–	0	1	–	8	–	0
$ – Conference champion

The 1953 Kent State Golden Flashes football team was an American football team that represented Kent State University in the Mid-American Conference (MAC) during the 1953 college football season. In their eighth season under head coach Trevor J. Rees, the Golden Flashes compiled a 7–2 record (3–1 against MAC opponents), finished in a tie for third place in the MAC, and outscored all opponents by a combined total of 250 to 103. The team's statistical leaders included Lou Mariano with 816 rushing yards, Don Burke with 577 passing yards, and Gino Gioia with 84 receiving yards. Fullback Jim Cullom and offensive tackle Al Kilgore were selected as first-team All-MAC players.

== Schedule ==
Date	Opponent	Site	Result	Attendance	Source
September 19	at Waynesburg*	Waynesburg, PA	W 20–10		
September 25	Fort Belvoir*	Memorial Stadium; Kent, OH	L 6–7		
October 3	at Western Reserve	Clarke Field; Cleveland, OH	W 27–0		
October 9	Baldwin–Wallace*	Memorial Stadium; Kent, OH	W 14–13		
October 17	at Ohio	Peden Stadium; Athens, OH	L 21–40	10,417	
October 24	Marshall*	Memorial Stadium; Kent, OH	W 27–7		
October 31	at Bowling Green	University Stadium; Bowling Green, OH (rivalry)	W 41–7		
November 7	Akron*	Memorial Stadium; Kent, OH (Wagon Wheel)	W 54–19		
November 14	at Western Michigan	Waldo Stadium; Kalamazoo, MI	W 40–0		
*Non-conference game
