= Ron Hansen (American football) =

American football player (1932–1993)

No. 69
- Positions: Guard, linebacker

Personal information
- Born: February 10, 1932; Northfield, Minnesota, U.S.
- Died: March 15, 1993 (aged 61); Elysian Township, Minnesota, U.S.
- Listed height: 6 ft 0 in (1.83 m)
- Listed weight: 220 lb (100 kg)

Career information
- High school: Northfield
- College: Minnesota (1950–1953)
- NFL draft: 1954: 28th round, 332nd overall pick

Career history
- Washington Redskins (1954)

Career NFL statistics
- Games played: 12
- Games started: 6
- Fumble recoveries: 2
- Stats at Pro Football Reference

Ronald Melrich Hansen (February 10, 1932 – March 15, 1993) was an American professional football guard and linebacker in the National Football League (NFL) for the Washington Redskins in 1954. He played college football at the University of Minnesota and was drafted in the 28th round of the 1954 NFL draft.
