= John Bauer (American football) =

American football player (1932–2010)

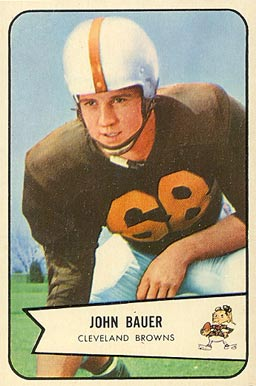
- Bauer on a 1954 Bowman football card

No. 65
- Positions: Guard, tackle

Personal information
- Born: March 11, 1932; Benton, Illinois, U.S.
- Died: December 26, 2010 (aged 78)
- Listed height: 6 ft 3 in (1.91 m)
- Listed weight: 235 lb (107 kg)

Career information
- High school: Benton
- College: Illinois (1951–1953)
- NFL draft: 1954: 1st round, 12th overall pick

Career history
- New York Giants (1954); Joliet Explorers (1965)

Awards and highlights
- Third-team All-American (1953)

Career NFL statistics
- Games played: 2
- Stats at Pro Football Reference

John Richard Bauer (March 11, 1932 – December 26, 2010) was an American professional football guard and tackle who played for the National Football League's (NFL) New York Giants.

Born in Benton, Illinois, Bauer attended the University of Illinois, where he played for the school's football team from 1951 to 1953. In the first round of the 1954 NFL draft, the Cleveland Browns chose him with the 12th overall pick. In August 1954, Bauer was traded to the Green Bay Packers as part of a six-player transaction. A month later, the Giants acquired Bauer from the Packers in another trade. Bauer played in two games for the Giants during the 1954 NFL season as a backup. He went into the Army and returned to the Giants in 1957, but left the team before the start of the season.
