= Bobby Garrett =

American football player (1932–1987)

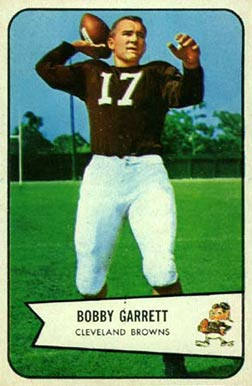
- Garrett on a 1954 Bowman football card

No. 17, 15
- Position: Quarterback

Personal information
- Born: August 16, 1932; Los Angeles, California, U.S.
- Died: December 5, 1987 (aged 55); Westminster, California, U.S.
- Listed height: 6 ft 1 in (1.85 m)
- Listed weight: 198 lb (90 kg)

Career information
- High school: South Pasadena (South Pasadena, California)
- College: Stanford
- NFL draft: 1954: 1st round, 1st overall pick

Career history
- Cleveland Browns (1954)*; Green Bay Packers (1954)
- * Offseason or practice squad member only

Awards and highlights
- First-team All-American (1953); Voit Trophy (1953); Pop Warner Trophy (1953); NCAA passing yards leader (1953); First-team All-PCC (1953); Second-team All-PCC (1952)

Career NFL statistics
- Passing attempts: 30
- Passing completions: 15
- Completion percentage: 50.0%
- TD–INT: 0–1
- Passing yards: 143
- Passer rating: 49.7
- Stats at Pro Football Reference

Robert Driscoll Garrett (August 16, 1932 – 5 December 1987) was an American professional football quarterback who played for Stanford University and played one season in the National Football League (NFL).

== College career ==
Born in Los Angeles, California, Garrett was an All-American quarterback at Stanford University. Garrett became Stanford's starting quarterback in 1952, his junior year. He led Stanford to a 5–3 record in games he started. After he suffered a season-ending shoulder injury in a loss to USC, Stanford lost its two remaining games, finishing with a 5–5 record.

In 1953, Garrett led Stanford to a 6–3–1 record. Stanford finished second behind UCLA in the Pacific Coast Conference, with a 4–1–1 conference record. Garrett not only played quarterback but also played as a defensive back, punted, and kicked PATs. Although he passed right-handed, he kicked PATs with his left foot. The highlight of Stanford's season was a 21–20 victory over fourth-ranked UCLA in which Garrett, who played every minute on offense and defense, threw three touchdown passes, kicked three extra points, recovered a fumble, and intercepted a pass. After the game, UCLA coach Henry Russell Sanders (known as "Red") stated, "I have never seen a game so dominated by one man." In a losing effort against USC, Garrett set a Pacific Coast Conference record for passing yardage in a single game, with 324 yards.

For the 1953 season, Garrett completed 118 passes in 205 attempts with 10 interceptions for 1,637 yards and 17 touchdowns. He also rushed for two touchdowns. He kicked 26 PATs in 30 attempts and intercepted 9 passes. His 17 touchdown passes set a PCC single-season record. His 17 touchdown passes, 19 total touchdowns, 1,637 passing yards, 57.6% completion rate among passers with 150 or more attempts, 26 PATs, and 9 interceptions on defense all led the nation.

Honors he received included:

- W.J. Voit Memorial Trophy as the outstanding football player on the Pacific Coast
- Pop Warner Trophy as the most valuable senior player on the West Coast
- most valuable player of the East-West Shrine Game
- most valuable player of the Hula Bowl
- Stanford Athletics Hall of Fame

== Professional career ==
The Cleveland Browns selected Garrett with the first overall pick of the 1954 NFL draft. The Browns signed him to a contract of $15,000 a year with a $5,000 signing bonus, which at the time was a record contract for a rookie. Cleveland traded Garrett to the Green Bay Packers before he arrived in Cleveland, apparently because Garrett's required military service did not fit in with the Browns' plans. Garrett appeared in 9 games in 1954 as the Packers' second-string quarterback, completing 15 of 30 passes. Garrett then served two years in the Air Force, after which Cleveland re-acquired him from Green Bay. Garrett never played a game for the Browns. He resigned from pro football during the 1957 season.

== Personal life ==
Garrett stuttered. One of his teammates on the Packers stated that he had difficulty calling plays in the huddle, but a Stanford sportswriter disputes this, pointing out that his stutter was not an issue at Stanford.

== See also ==
- List of college football yearly passing leaders
