= List of Georgia Tech Yellow Jackets in the NFL draft =

This is a list of Georgia Tech Yellow Jackets football players in the NFL draft.

== Key ==
B	Back	K	Kicker	NT	Nose tackle
C	Center	LB	Linebacker	FB	Fullback
DB	Defensive back	P	Punter	HB	Halfback
DE	Defensive end	QB	Quarterback	WR	Wide receiver
DT	Defensive tackle	RB	Running back	G	Guard
E	End	OT	Offensive tackle	TE	Tight end

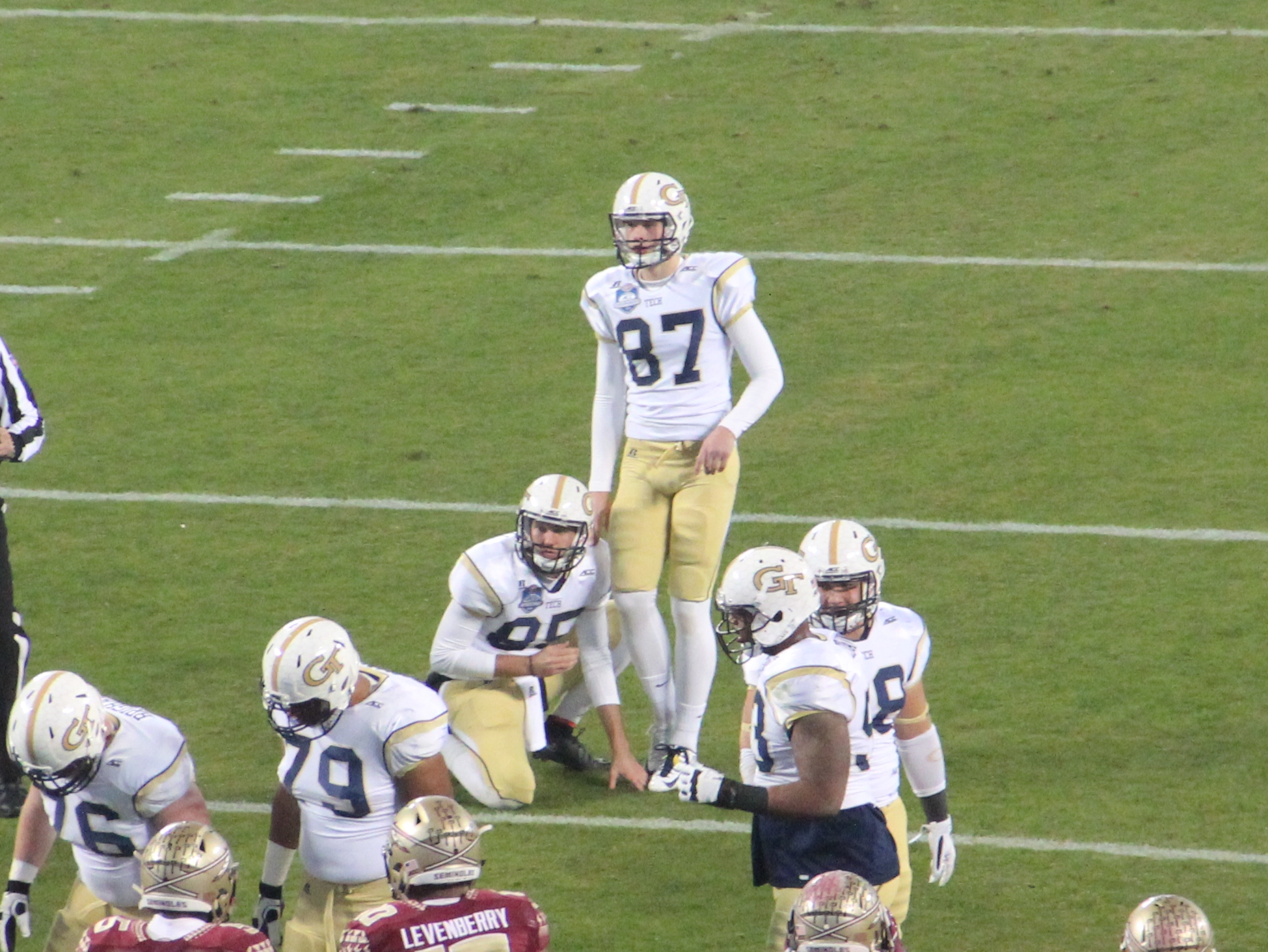
Harrison Butker

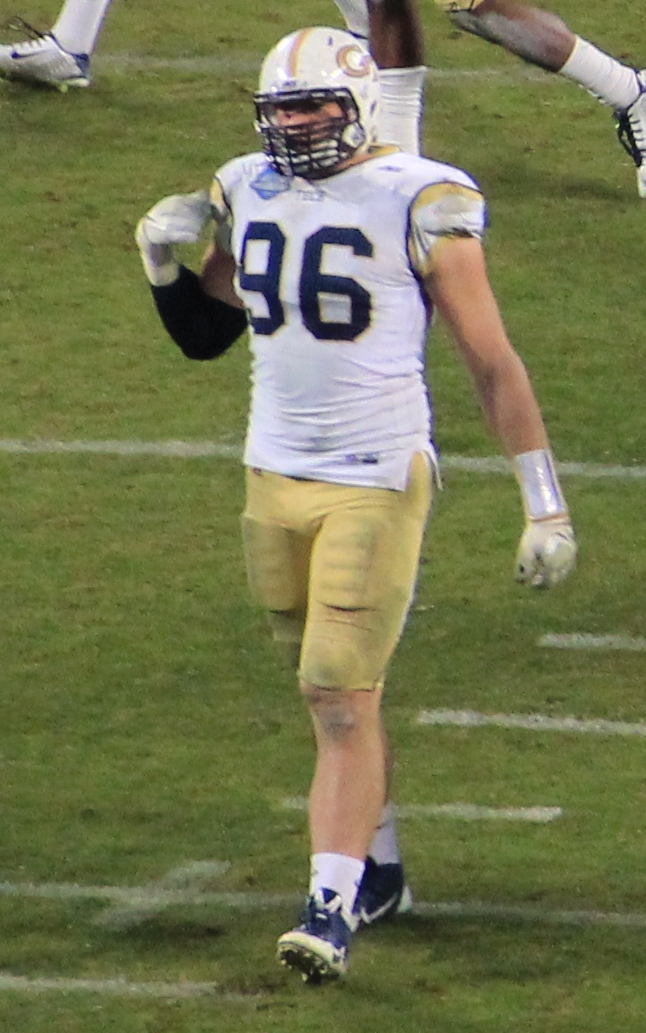
Adam Gotsis

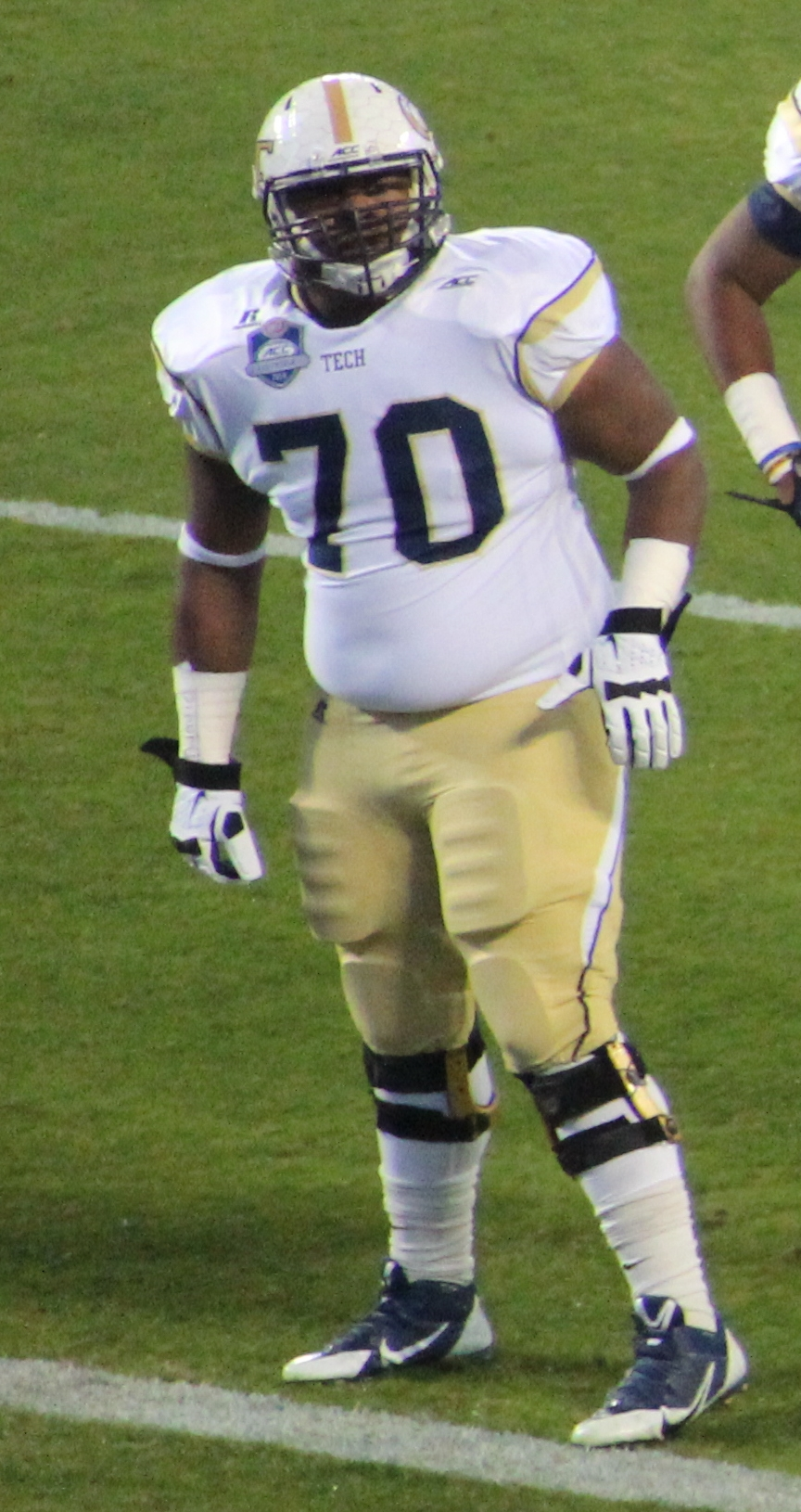
Shaq Mason

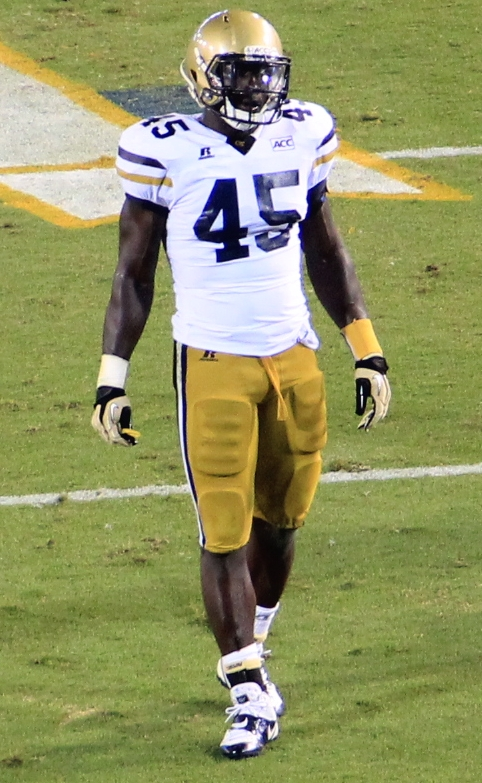
Jeremiah Attaochu

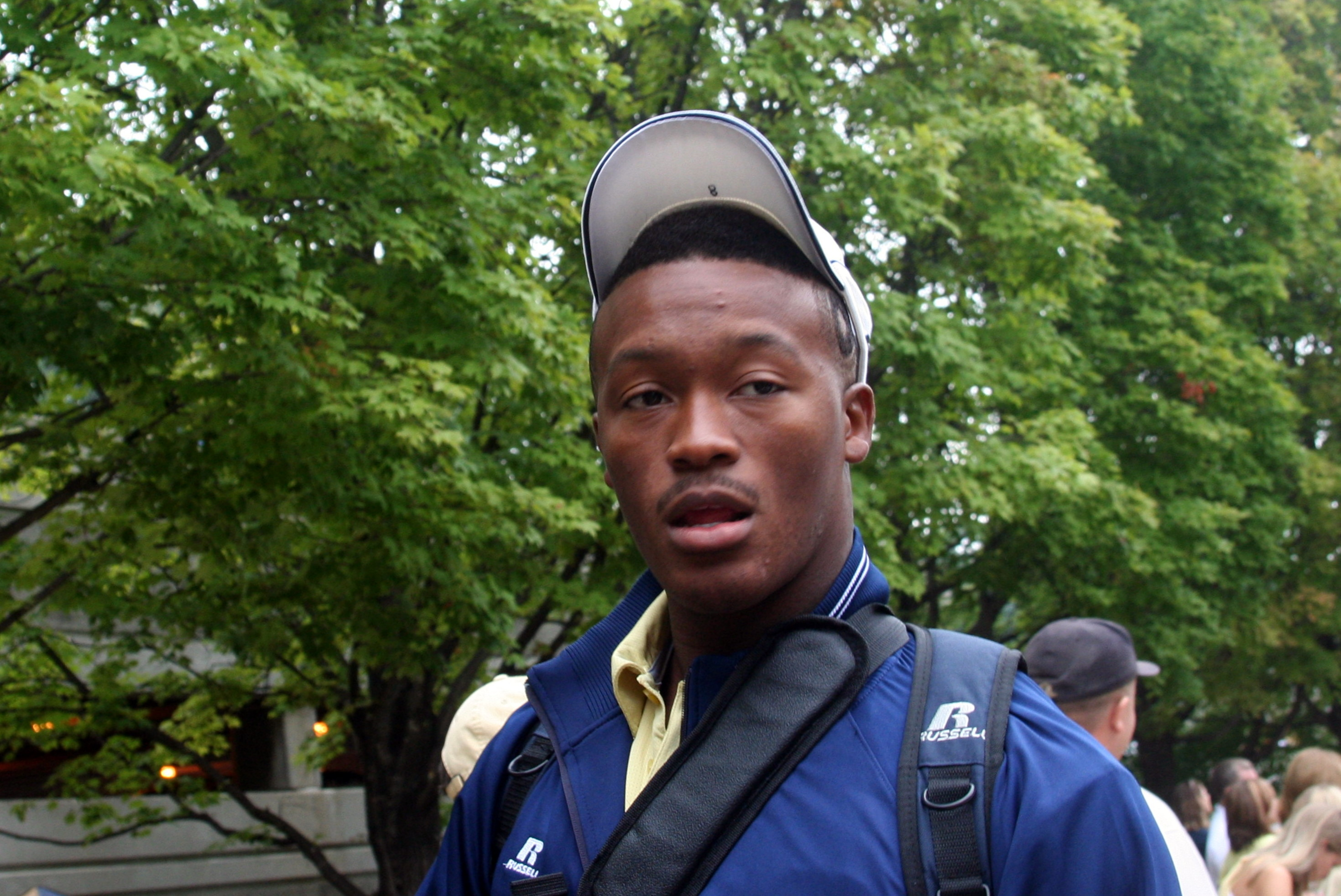
Demaryius Thomas

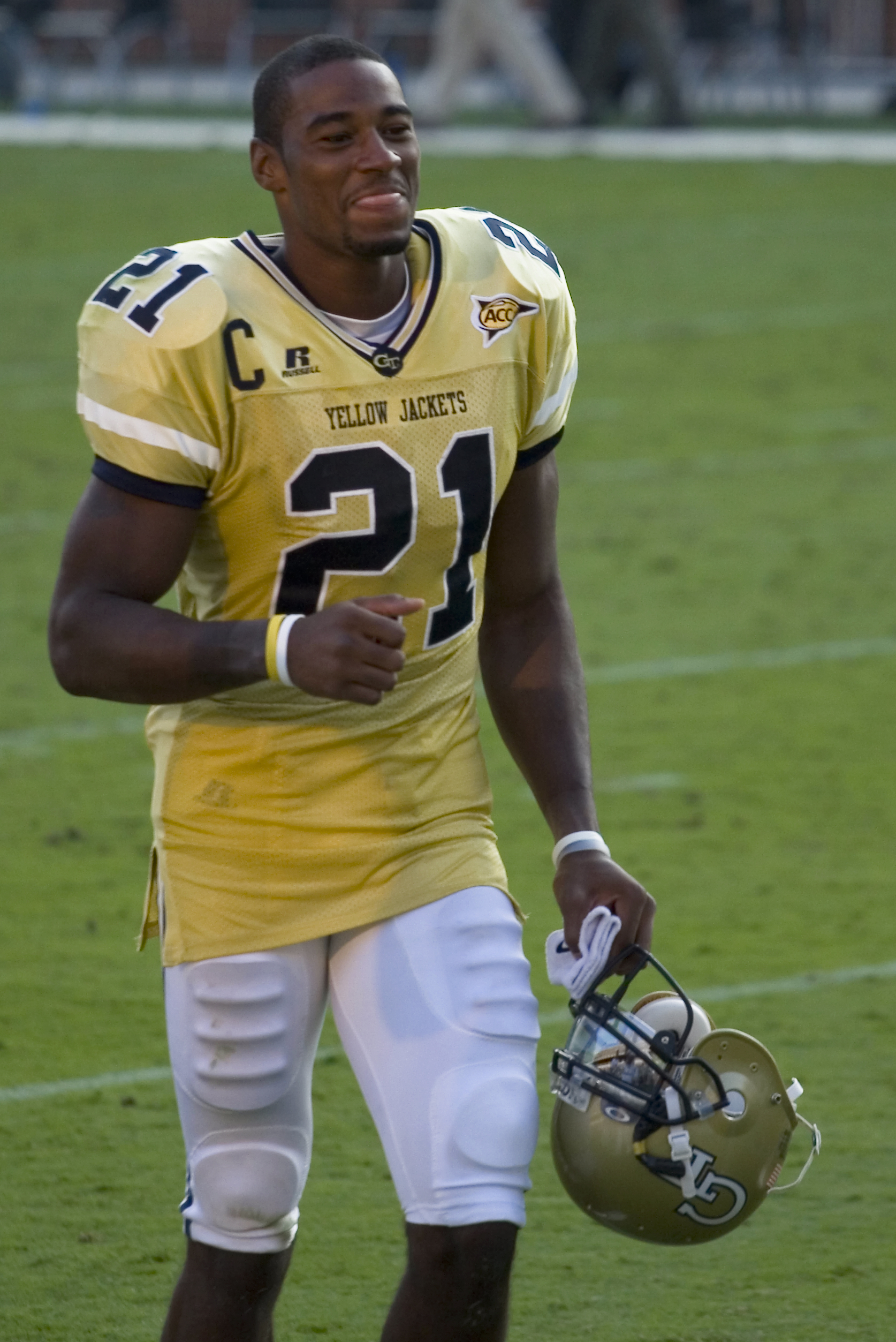
Calvin Johnson

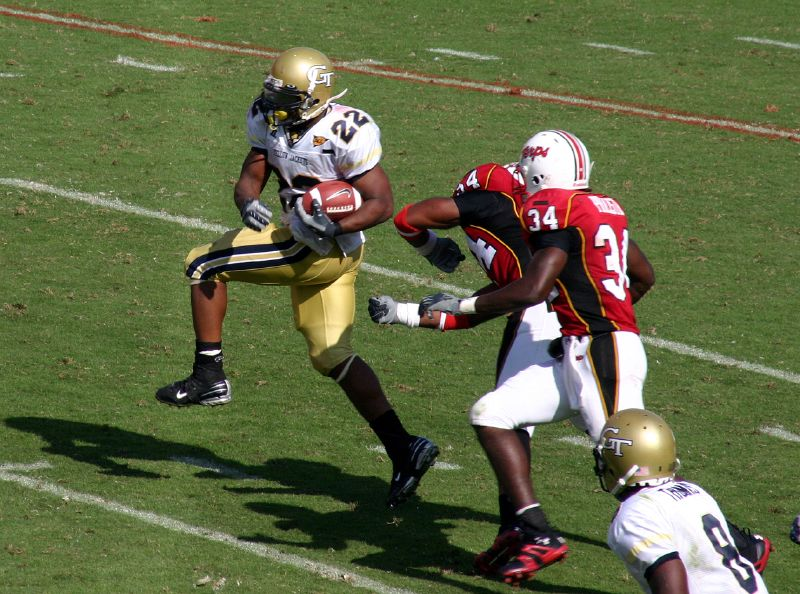
Tashard Choice

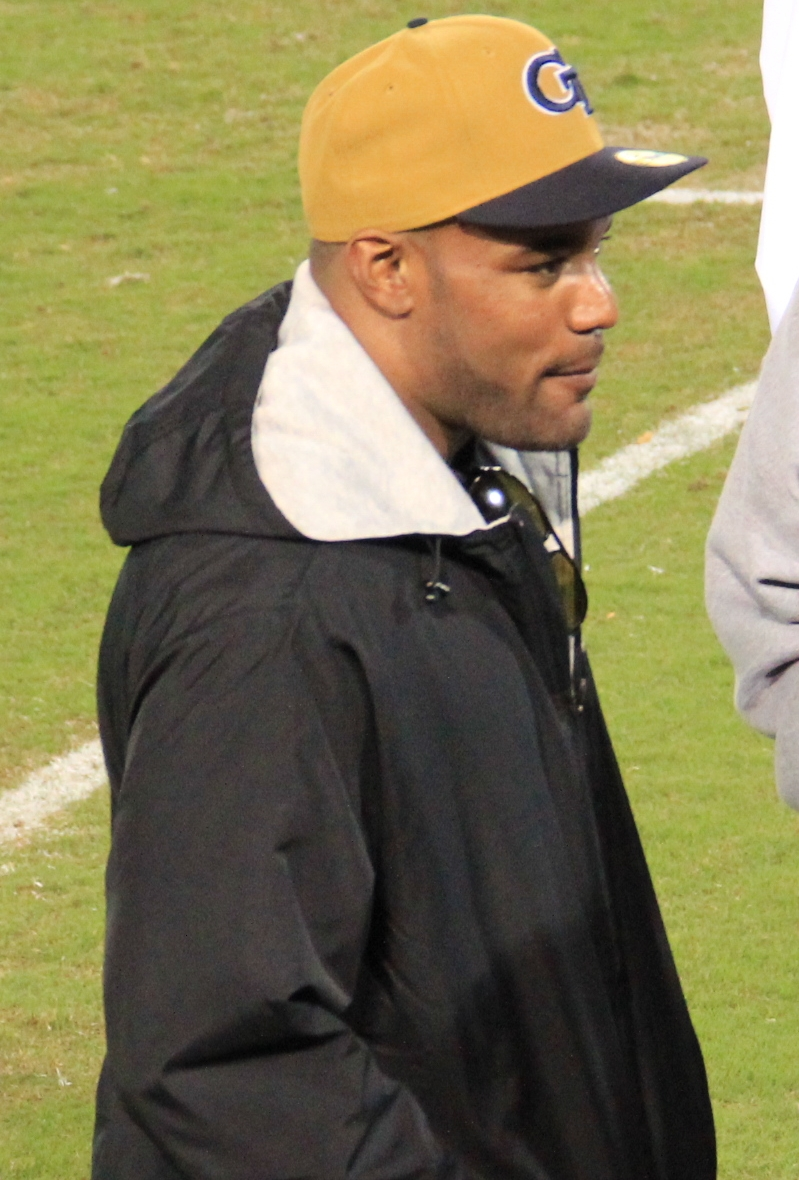
Keyaron Fox

== Selections ==
Year	Round	Pick	Overall	Player	Team	Position	Notes
1937	10	2	92	Middleton Fitzsimmons	Chicago Cardinals	G	
1938	5	8	38	Marion Konemann	New York Giants	B	
1938	8	10	70	Fletcher Sims	Chicago Bears	B	
1940	20	8	188	F. W. Murphy	Washington Redskins	B	
1943	26	3	243	Harvey Hardy	Brooklyn Dodgers	G	
1944	17	3	167	Jack Helms	Detroit Lions	T	
1944	17	8	172	Ed Ryckeley	Chicago Bears	E	
1945	1	4	4	Eddie Prokop	Boston Yanks	B	
1945	7	7	61	John Steber	Washington Redskins	G	
1946	3	4	19	Frank Broyles	Chicago Bears	QB	
1946	4	5	30	Paul Duke	New York Giants	C	
1946	12	8	108	Pat McHugh	Philadelphia Eagles	B	
1946	14	6	126	George Hills	Green Bay Packers	G	
1946	16	6	146	Dean Gaines	Green Bay Packers	T	
1946	27	6	256	Ed Holtsinger	Green Bay Packers	B	
1946	27	8	258	Chuck Murdock	Detroit Lions	E	
1946	27	9	259	Roland Phillips	Washington Redskins	T	
1946	30	9	289	William Ritter	Washington Redskins	B	
1947	6	9	44	Bob Davis	New York Giants	T	
1947	12	5	100	George Hills	Green Bay Packers	G	
1948	5	4	29	Bill Healey	Boston Yanks	G	
1948	16	10	145	Jim Still	Chicago Cardinals	B	
1948	18	1	156	George Mathews	New York Giants	B	
1948	28	7	262	Dinky Bowen	Pittsburgh Steelers	B	
1949	3	8	29	Frank Ziegler	Philadelphia Eagles	B	
1949	5	1	42	George Brodnax	Detroit Lions	E	
1949	8	9	80	Joe E. Brown	Chicago Cardinals	B	
1949	25	6	247	Clay Matthews	Los Angeles Rams	T	
1951	13	1	148	Dick Harvin	San Francisco 49ers	E	
1951	14	10	169	Rob McCoy	Los Angeles Rams	B	
1951	15	6	177	Bobby North	Philadelphia Eagles	B	
1951	27	1	316	Bob Bossons	Green Bay Packers	C	
1952	2	10	23	Ray Beck	New York Giants	G	
1952	3	4	29	Lum Snyder	Philadelphia Eagles	T	
1952	17	2	195	Darrell Crawford	Chicago Cardinals	B	
1953	2	8	21	George Morris	San Francisco 49ers	C	
1953	4	2	39	Gerdes Martin	Chicago Cardinals	E	
1953	5	8	57	Hal Miller	San Francisco 49ers	T	
1953	10	9	118	Pete Brown	San Francisco 49ers	G	
1953	13	1	146	Bobby Morehead	Baltimore Colts	B	
1953	23	7	272	Jeff Knox	Philadelphia Eagles	E	
1954	3	9	34	Henry Hair	Los Angeles Rams	E	
1954	7	4	77	Glenn Turner	Baltimore Colts	B	
1954	9	2	99	Dave Davis	Green Bay Packers	E	
1954	13	9	154	Sam Hensley	Los Angeles Rams	E	
1954	15	2	171	Ed Gossage	San Francisco 49ers	T	
1954	16	9	190	Roger Frey	Los Angeles Rams	T	
1954	19	9	226	Frank Givens	Los Angeles Rams	T	
1954	23	4	269	Leon Hardeman	Baltimore Colts	B	
1954	25	4	293	Pepper Rodgers	Baltimore Colts	B	
1954	27	4	317	Bill Sennett	Baltimore Colts	E	
1955	1	7	7	Larry Morris	Los Angeles Rams	C	
1955	8	6	91	Billy Teas	Los Angeles Rams	B	
1955	14	3	160	John Lee	Baltimore Colts	B	
1955	21	5	246	Rees Phenix	Pittsburgh Steelers	T	
1956	20	5	234	Dickie Mattison	Chicago Cardinals	B	
1956	25	10	299	Franklin Brooks	Washington Redskins	G	
1957	4	4	41	Carl Vereen	Green Bay Packers	T	
1957	6	5	66	George Volkert	Pittsburgh Steelers	B	
1957	12	8	141	Wade Mitchell	Washington Redskins	QB	
1957	21	8	249	Sam Owen	Washington Redskins	B	
1957	26	8	309	Paul Rotenberry	Washington Redskins	B	
1957	27	8	321	Ormand Anderson	Washington Redskins	T	
1958	3	3	28	Stan Flowers	Washington Redskins	B	
1958	4	1	38	Urban Henry	Los Angeles Rams	T	
1958	16	1	182	Arley Finley	Green Bay Packers	T	
1958	19	5	222	Don Stephenson	Washington Redskins	C	
1958	30	4	353	Ted Smith	Washington Redskins	E	
1959	11	2	122	Floyd Faucette	Chicago Cardinals	B	
1959	17	5	197	Jack Rudolph	Detroit Lions	E	
1959	18	2	206	Jim Benson	Philadelphia Eagles	B	
1959	20	6	234	Toby Deese	San Francisco 49ers	T	
1960	2	8	20	Maxie Baughan	Philadelphia Eagles	LB	
1960	6	7	67	Emmett Wilson	Philadelphia Eagles	T	
1960	7	8	80	Taz Anderson	Cleveland Browns	RB	
1961	2	0	0	Billy Shaw	Buffalo Bills	G	
1961	2	13	27	Ed Nutting	Cleveland Browns	T	
1961	6	1	71	Jerry Burch	Minnesota Vikings	E	
1961	9	8	120	Chick Granning	St. Louis Cardinals	RB	
1961	14	2	184	Billy Shaw	Dallas Cowboys	T	
1961	20	4	270	Al Lederle	Los Angeles Rams	E	
1962	17	3	227	Dave Steadman	Los Angeles Rams	T	
1962	19	12	264	Harold Ericksen	Philadelphia Eagles	G	
1963	1	10	10	Rufus Guthrie	Los Angeles Rams	G	
1963	5	1	57	Joe Auer	Los Angeles Rams	RB	
1963	9	10	122	Dave Watson	Baltimore Colts	LB	
1963	12	8	162	Bob Caldwell	Washington Redskins	C	
1963	14	8	190	Tom Winingder	Washington Redskins	B	
1963	18	3	241	Larry Stallings	St. Louis Cardinals	T	
1964	2	7	21	Billy Martin	Chicago Bears	E	
1964	4	8	50	Ted Davis	Baltimore Colts	E	
1964	6	3	73	Billy Lothridge	Dallas Cowboys	QB	
1964	20	13	279	Bill Curry	Green Bay Packers	C	
1965	2	8	22	Gerry Bussell	Cleveland Browns	RB	
1965	2	12	26	Dave Simmons	St. Louis Cardinals	LB	
1965	9	14	126	Tom Bleick	Baltimore Colts	B	
1965	17	7	231	Dave Austin	Philadelphia Eagles	E	
1966	12	6	176	Craig Baynham	Dallas Cowboys	RB	
1966	17	10	255	Jim Breeland	San Francisco 49ers	C	
1966	18	4	264	Bill Moorer	Philadelphia Eagles	C	
1967	13	7	322	Lamar Wright	Detroit Lions	G	
1967	15	7	374	Sam Burke	Detroit Lions	DB	
1968	7	6	171	Lenny Snow	Minnesota Vikings	RB	
1968	8	25	217	Randall Edmonds	Miami Dolphins	LB	
1968	11	9	282	Kim King	Pittsburgh Steelers	QB	
1969	9	24	232	Larry Good	Baltimore Colts	QB	
1969	13	4	321	John Sias	Denver Broncos	WR	
1969	15	20	384	Joe Stevenson	Cleveland Browns	TE	
1969	17	5	421	Terry Story	Cincinnati Bengals	T	
1971	16	6	396	Steve Harkey	New York Jets	RB	
1972	9	10	218	Jeff Ford	New York Jets	DB	
1973	16	19	409	Mike Oven	San Francisco 49ers	TE	
1973	17	4	420	Eddie McAshan	New England Patriots	QB	
1975	6	6	136	Billy Shields	San Diego Chargers	T	
1975	8	15	197	Joe Harris	Chicago Bears	LB	
1975	14	6	344	Randy Rhino	New Orleans Saints	DB	
1975	15	3	367	Jimmy Robinson	Atlanta Falcons	WR	
1976	2	31	59	Steve Raible	Seattle Seahawks	WR	
1976	11	19	310	Rick Gibney	Baltimore Colts	DT	
1976	16	1	432	Jeff Urczyk	Seattle Seahawks	G	
1976	17	24	483	Dan Myers	St. Louis Cardinals	DB	
1977	7	2	169	David Sims	Seattle Seahawks	RB	
1977	11	14	293	Tony Daykin	Detroit Lions	LB	
1977	12	18	325	Leo Tierney	Cleveland Browns	C	
1978	3	10	66	Reggie Wilken	Philadelphia Eagles	LB	
1978	4	5	89	Lucius Sanford	Buffalo Bills	LB	
1978	6	9	147	Randy Pass	New York Giants	G	
1979	1	15	15	Eddie Lee Ivery	Green Bay Packers	RB	
1979	1	26	26	Kent Hill	Los Angeles Rams	T	
1979	5	24	134	Don Bessillieu	Miami Dolphins	DB	
1979	8	9	201	Roy Simmons	New York Giants	G	
1979	11	23	298	Mike Taylor	Houston Oilers	T	
1979	11	24	299	Mike Blanton	Miami Dolphins	DE	
1979	12	25	328	Drew Hill	Los Angeles Rams	WR	
1980	7	9	174	Henry Johnson	Minnesota Vikings	LB	
1980	8	8	201	Al Richardson	Atlanta Falcons	LB	
1980	10	17	266	Rom Daniel	New England Patriots	C	
1982	6	10	149	Mike Kelley	Atlanta Falcons	QB	
1983	2	6	34	Dave Lutz	Kansas City Chiefs	T	
1983	6	6	146	Ellis Gardner	Kansas City Chiefs	T	
1983	11	1	280	Jim Bob Taylor	Baltimore Colts	QB	
1984	10	9	261	Ronny Cone	New York Jets	RB	
1985	4	19	103	Robert Lavette	Dallas Cowboys	RB	
1985	12	5	313	Ken Whisenhunt	Atlanta Falcons	TE	
1986	3	5	60	Pat Swilling	New Orleans Saints	LB	
1986	7	12	178	Mark Pike	Buffalo Bills	LB	
1986	12	28	333	Mike Travis	San Diego Chargers	DB	
1987	4	16	100	Reggie Rutland	Minnesota Vikings	DB	
1987	11	8	287	John Davis	Houston Oilers	G	
1987	12	8	315	Gary Lee	Detroit Lions	WR	
1987	12	12	319	Tyrone Sorrells	New Orleans Saints	G	
1988	8	9	202	Sammy Lilly	New York Giants	DB	
1988	12	25	330	Paul Jurgensen	New Orleans Saints	LB	
1989	5	7	119	Willis Crockett	Dallas Cowboys	LB	
1989	11	2	281	Cedric Stallworth	Green Bay Packers	DB	
1990	11	4	280	Sean Smith	New England Patriots	DE	
1991	7	7	174	Calvin Tiggle	Tampa Bay Buccaneers	LB	
1991	10	18	268	Jim Lavin	Cincinnati Bengals	G	
1992	1	12	12	Marco Coleman	Miami Dolphins	DE	
1992	4	24	108	Mike Mooney	Houston Oilers	T	
1992	7	16	184	Ken Swilling	Tampa Bay Buccaneers	DB	
1992	8	25	221	Willie Clay	Detroit Lions	DB	
1992	11	20	300	Tom Covington	San Francisco 49ers	TE	
1993	2	7	36	Coleman Rudolph	New York Jets	DE	
1993	5	1	113	Scott Sisson	New England Patriots	K	
1994	5	17	148	Gary Brown	Pittsburgh Steelers	T	
1994	5	18	149	Dorsey Levens	Green Bay Packers	RB	
1995	5	17	151	Lethon Flowers	Pittsburgh Steelers	DB	
1995	6	2	173	Charlie Simmons	Green Bay Packers	WR	
1995	7	21	229	Jamal Cox	Chicago Bears	LB	
1996	2	30	60	Michael Cheever	Jacksonville Jaguars	C	
1996	3	15	76	Ryan Stewart	Detroit Lions	DB	
1998	1	12	12	Keith Brooking	Atlanta Falcons	LB	
1998	6	1	154	Ron Rogers	Baltimore Ravens	LB	
1999	4	12	107	Nate Stimson	Washington Redskins	LB	
1999	5	19	152	Charlie Rogers	Seattle Seahawks	WR	
1999	7	46	252	Rodney Williams	St. Louis Rams	P	
2000	2	27	58	Travares Tillman	Buffalo Bills	DB	
2000	3	7	69	Dez White	Chicago Bears	WR	
2000	7	28	234	Joe Hamilton	Tampa Bay Buccaneers	QB	
2002	6	5	177	Nick Rogers	Minnesota Vikings	LB	
2002	7	17	228	Chris Young	Denver Broncos	DB	
2003	2	0	0	Tony Hollings	Houston Texans	RB	
2004	2	7	39	Daryl Smith	Jacksonville Jaguars	LB	
2004	3	28	91	Tony Hargrove	St. Louis Rams	DE	
2004	3	30	93	Keyaron Fox	Kansas City Chiefs	LB	
2004	4	19	115	Nat Dorsey	Minnesota Vikings	T	
2004	7	13	214	Jonathan Smith	Buffalo Bills	RB	
2006	3	32	96	Gerris Wilkinson	New York Giants	LB	
2006	4	35	132	P. J. Daniels	Baltimore Ravens	RB	
2006	5	13	146	Dawan Landry	Baltimore Ravens	DB	
2007	1	2	2	Calvin Johnson	Detroit Lions	WR	
2007	4	25	124	Mansfield Wrotto	Seattle Seahawks	G	
2008	3	30	93	Philip Wheeler	Indianapolis Colts	LB	
2008	4	23	122	Tashard Choice	Dallas Cowboys	RB	
2008	6	2	168	Durant Brooks	Washington Redskins	P	
2009	3	6	70	Michael Johnson	Cincinnati Bengals	DE	
2009	6	8	181	Andrew Gardner	Miami Dolphins	T	
2009	7	1	210	Vance Walker	Atlanta Falcons	DT	
2009	7	25	234	Darryl Richard	New England Patriots	DT	
2010	1	16	16	Derrick Morgan	Tennessee Titans	DE	
2010	1	22	22	Demaryius Thomas	Denver Broncos	WR	
2010	3	7	71	Morgan Burnett	Green Bay Packers	DB	
2010	6	19	188	Jonathan Dwyer	Pittsburgh Steelers	RB	
2011	7	22	225	Anthony Allen	Baltimore Ravens	RB	
2012	2	11	43	Stephen Hill	New York Jets	WR	
2014	2	18	50	Jeremiah Attaochu	San Diego Chargers	LB	
2014	6	30	206	Jemea Thomas	New England Patriots	DB	
2014	7	8	223	Brandon Watts	Minnesota Vikings	LB	
2015	4	32	131	Shaq Mason	New England Patriots	C	
2015	4	33	132	DeAndre Smelter	San Francisco 49ers	WR	
2015	6	28	204	Darren Waller	Baltimore Ravens	WR	
2016	2	32	63	Adam Gotsis	Denver Broncos	DT	
2016	6	3	178	D. J. White	Kansas City Chiefs	DB	
2017	7	15	233	Harrison Butker	Carolina Panthers	K	Super Bowl LIV, LVII, LVIII champion, All-Rookie Team (2017)
2020	6	27	206	Tyler Davis	Jacksonville Jaguars	TE	
2021	6	25	209	Jalen Camp	Jacksonville Jaguars	WR	
2021	7	26	254	Pressley Harvin III	Pittsburgh Steelers	P	All-Rookie Team (2021)
2022	7	7	228	Tariq Carpenter	Green Bay Packers	LB	
2023	2	15	46	Keion White	New England Patriots	DE	
2025	5	33	173	Jackson Hawes	Buffalo Bills	TE	
2025	7	37	253	Zeek Biggers	Miami Dolphins	DT	
2026	1	26	26	Keylan Rutledge	Houston Texans	G	
2026	6	32	213	Jordan van den Berg	Chicago Bears	DT	

== See also ==
- List of Georgia Institute of Technology alumni
