= 1951 All-SEC football team =

American college football all-star team

The 1951 All-SEC football team consists of American football players selected to the All-Southeastern Conference (SEC) chosen by various selectors for the 1951 college football season. Georgia Tech and Tennessee shared the conference title. The Associated Press selection had two platoons.

== All-SEC selections ==
=== Offense ===
==== Ends ====
- Steve Meilinger, Kentucky (College Football Hall of Fame) (AP-1, UP-1)
- Harry Babcock, Georgia (AP-1, UP-3)
- Ben Roderick, Vanderbilt (AP-2, UP-1)
- Red Lutz, Alabama (AP-2, UP-2)
- Buck Martin, Georgia Tech (AP-2, UP-2)
- Lee Hayley, Auburn (AP-3, UP-3)
- Warren Virgets, LSU (AP-3)

==== Tackles ====
- Bob Werckle, Vanderbilt (AP-1, UP-2)
- Lum Snyder, Georgia Tech (AP-1)
- Charlie LaPradd, Florida (UP-2)
- Jerry Helluin, Tulane (AP-2, UP-3)
- Jim Mackenzie, Kentucky (AP-2)
- Bill Pyron, Miss. St. (AP-2, UP-3)
- Hal Miller, Georgia Tech (AP-3)
- Ray Potter, LSU (AP-3)

==== Guards ====
- John Michels, Tennessee (College Football Hall of Fame) (AP-1, UP-3)
- Gene Donaldson, Kentucky (AP-1)
- Sid Fournet, LSU (AP-2, UP-2)
- Foots Bauer, Auburn (AP-2, UP-2)
- John Ignarski, Kentucky (UP-3)
- Ed Duncan, Auburn (AP-3)
- Jerry Watford, Alabama (AP-3)

==== Centers ====
- Doug Moseley, Kentucky (AP-1, UP-1)
- Carroll McDonald, Florida (AP-2)
- Gordon Polofsky, Tennessee (AP-2, UP-2)
- Ralph Carrigan, Alabama (UP-3)
- Bob Davis, Tennessee (AP-3)

==== Quarterbacks ====
- Babe Parilli, Kentucky (AP-1, UP-1)
- Darrell Crawford, Georgia Tech (AP-1, UP-1)
- Bill Wade, Vanderbilt (AP-1, UP-2)
- Zeke Bratkowski, Georgia (AP-2, UP-3)

=== Backs ===
- Hank Lauricella, Tennessee (College Football Hall of Fame) (AP-1, UP-1)
- Andy Kozar, Tennessee (AP-2, UP-2)
- Leon Hardeman, Georgia Tech (AP-3, UP-2)
- Bobby Marlow, Alabama (AP-2)
- Bert Rechichar, Tennessee (AP-2)
- Haywood Sullivan, Florida (AP-3, UP-3)
- Jimmy Lear, Ole Miss (AP-3, UP-3)
- Herky Payne, Tennessee (AP-3, UP-3)

=== Defense ===
==== Ends ====
- Doug Atkins, Tennessee (AP-1)
- Harold Maxwell, Ole Miss (AP-1)
- Bob Flowers, Florida (AP-2)
- Jesse Yates, LSU (AP-3)
- Bob Fry, Kentucky (AP-3)

==== Tackles ====
- Pug Pearman, Tennessee (AP, UP-1)
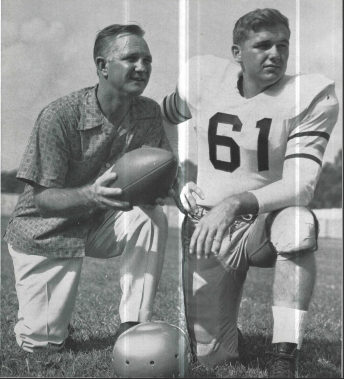
- Lamar Wheat (right)
  Lamar Wheat, Georgia Tech (AP-1, UP-1)
- Charlie LaPradd, Florida (AP-2)
- Marion Campbell, Georgia (AP-3)
- Bill Turnbeaugh, Auburn (AP-3)

==== Guards ====
- Ted Daffer, Tennessee (AP-1, UP-1)
- Ray Beck, Georgia Tech (College Football Hall of Fame) (AP-1, UP-1)
- Joe D'Agostino, Florida (AP-2)
- Jess Richardson, Alabama (AP-2)
- Art Kleinschmidt, Tulane (AP-3)
- John Cheadle, Vanderbilt (AP-3)

==== Linebackers ====
- George Tarasovic, LSU (AP-1)
- Joe Fortunato, Mississippi State (AP-1)
- Ralph Carrigan, Alabama (AP-2)
- Larry Morris, Georgia Tech (AP-3)

==== Backs ====
- Bobby Marlow, Alabama (AP-1, UP-1)
- Bert Rechichar, Tennessee (AP-1, UP-2)
- Claude Hipps, Georgia (AP-1)
- Vince Dooley, Auburn (AP-2)
- Jim Roshto, LSU (AP-2)
- Emery Clark, Kentucky (AP-3)
- Mickey Lakos, Vanderbilt (AP-3)
- Jim Barton, LSU (AP-3)
- Bobby Wilson, Alabama (AP-3)

== Key ==
AP = Associated Press

UP = United Press

Bold = Consensus first-team selection by both AP and UP

== See also ==
- 1951 College Football All-America Team
