= 1952 All-SEC football team =

American college football all-star team

The 1952 All-SEC football team consists of American football players selected to the All-Southeastern Conference (SEC) chosen by various selectors for the 1952 college football season. Georgia Tech won the conference.

== Offensive selections ==
=== Ends ===
- Steve Meilinger, Kentucky (College Football Hall of Fame) (AP-1, UP-1)
- Harry Babcock, Georgia (AP-1, UP-2)
- Buck Martin, Georgia Tech (AP-2, UP-1)
- Ben Roderick, Vanderbilt (AP-2, UP-2)
- Roger Rotroff, Tennessee (AP-3, UP-3)
- Lee Hayley, Auburn (AP-3)
- Jeff Knox, Georgia Tech (AP-3)
- James Mack, Ole Miss (UP-3)

=== Tackles ===
- Hal Miller, Georgia Tech (AP-1, UP-2)
- Kline Gilbert, Ole Miss (AP-1, UP-2)
- Bill Turnbeaugh, Auburn (AP-2, UP-3)
- Jim Haslam, Tennessee (AP-2)
- Travis Hunt, Alabama (AP-2)
- Paul Miller, LSU (AP-3, UP-3)
- Dewayne Douglas, Florida (AP-3)
- Bob Fry, Kentucky (AP-3)

=== Guards ===
- John Michels, Tennessee (College Football Hall of Fame) (AP-1, UP-1)
- Jerry Watford, Alabama (AP-1, UP-3)
- Crawford Mims, Ole Miss (AP-2, UP-2)
- Orville Vereen, Georgia Tech (AP-2, UP-2)
- Jake Shoemaker, Georgia Tech (AP-2)
- Al Robelot, Tulane (AP-2)
- Ed Gossage, Georgia Tech (AP-3, UP-3)
- Jerry May, Ole Miss (AP-3)

=== Centers ===
- Pete Brown, Georgia Tech (AP-1, UP-2)
- Bo Reid, Miss. St. (AP-2)
- Larry Stone, Vanderbilt (AP-3)

=== Quarterbacks ===
- Jackie Parker, Miss. St. (College Football Hall of Fame) (AP-1, UP-1)
- Jimmy Lear, Ole Miss (AP-3, UP-2)
- Bill Krietemeyer, Vanderbilt (UP-3)

=== Halfbacks ===
- Leon Hardeman, Georgia Tech (AP-1, UP-1)
- Bobby Marlow, Alabama (AP-1, UP-1)
- Zeke Bratkowski, Georgia (AP-2, UP-2)
- Joe Fortunato, Miss. St. (AP-2, UP-2)
- Corky Tharp, Alabama (AP-2, UP-3)
- Buford Long, Florida (AP-3, UP-3)
- Billy Teas, Georgia Tech (AP-3)

=== Fullbacks ===
- Andy Kozar, Tennessee (AP-1, UP-1)
- Rick Casares, Florida (AP-2, UP-2)
- Max McGee, Tulane (AP-3, UP-3)

== Defensive selections ==
=== Ends ===
- Sam Hensley, Georgia Tech (AP-1)
- Mack Franklin, Tennessee (AP-1)
- Joe O'Malley, Georgia (AP-2)
- Bob Hines, Vanderbilt (AP-2)
- Jim Mask, Ole Miss (AP-3)

=== Tackles ===
- Charlie LaPradd, Florida (AP-1, UP-1 [as T])
- Doug Atkins, Tennessee (AP-1, UP-1 [as T])
- Ed Culpepper, Alabama (AP-2)
- Bob Sherman, Georgia Tech (AP-3)

=== Guards ===
- Joe D'Agostino, Florida (AP-1, UP-1 [as G])
- Francis Holohan, Tennessee (AP-1)
- Chris Filipkowski, Georgia (AP-3)
- Tony Sardisco, Tulane (AP-3)

=== Linebackers ===
- George Morris, Georgia Tech (AP-1, UP-1 [as C])
- Ralph Carrigan, Alabama (AP-2)
- Charles Ware, Florida (AP-2)
- Arlen Jumper, Florida (AP-3)
- Bill Barbish, Tennessee (AP-3)
- Larry Morris, Georgia Tech (UP-3)

=== Backs ===
- Hootie Ingram, Alabama (AP-1)
- Bobby Moorhead, Georgia Tech (AP-1)
- Art DeCarlo, Georgia (AP-1)
- Bobby Jordan, Auburn (AP-2)
- Tommy Adkins, Kentucky (AP-2)
- George Brancato, LSU (AP-2)
- Charlie Brannon, Georgia Tech (AP-3)
- Charles Oakley, LSU (AP-3)
- Don Gleisner, Vanderbilt (AP-3)

== Key ==
AP = Associated Press

UP = United Press.

Bold = Consensus first-team selection by both AP and UP

== See also ==
- 1952 College Football All-America Team
