= Joe Fortunato (linebacker) =

American football player and coach (1930–2017)

No. 31
- Position: Linebacker

Personal information
- Born: March 28, 1930; Mingo Junction, Ohio, U.S.
- Died: November 6, 2017 (aged 87); Natchez, Mississippi, U.S.
- Listed height: 6 ft 1 in (1.85 m)
- Listed weight: 225 lb (102 kg)

Career information
- High school: Mingo Junction
- College: VMI (1949); Mississippi State (1950–1952)
- NFL draft: 1952: 7th round, 80th overall pick

Career history

Playing
- Chicago Bears (1955–1966)

Coaching
- Chicago Bears (1967) Linebackers coach; Chicago Bears (1968) Defensive coordinator

Awards and highlights
- NFL champion (1963); 3× First-team All-Pro (1963–1965); Second-team All-Pro (1962); 5× Pro Bowl (1958, 1962–1965); NFL 1950s All-Decade Team; 100 greatest Bears of All-Time; First-team All-American (1951); First-team All-SEC (1951); Second-team All-SEC (1952)

Career NFL statistics
- Interceptions: 16
- Fumble recoveries: 22
- Total touchdowns: 3
- Stats at Pro Football Reference

Joseph Francis Fortunato Jr. (March 28, 1930 – November 6, 2017) was an American professional football player who spent his entire 12-year National Football League (NFL) career playing linebacker for the Chicago Bears. A five-time Pro Bowl selection, he was the captain and signal-caller for the Bears defense, leading to an NFL Championship in 1963. Fortunato is one of only four players, and the only defensive player named to the National Football League 1950s All-Decade Team who has not yet been enshrined in the Pro Football Hall of Fame.

Prior to the NFL, Fortunato played fullback and linebacker for Mississippi State University, and made All-American in 1951.

== Early life ==
Fortunato was born on March 28, 1930, in Mingo Junction, Ohio. He worked in his grandparents’ grocery store as a child and in the steel mill as a teen.

== College career ==
=== VMI ===
Fortunato initially attended Virginia Military Institute (VMI) where he was a member of the VMI Keydets football team in 1949.

=== Mississippi State University ===
In 1950, he transferred to Mississippi State College—now known as Mississippi State University, reuniting him with head coach Slick Morton who was previously the head coach at VMI. He played both fullback and linebacker since college football had reverted to primarily single-platoon football, meaning those players that were on offense had to switch to defense, and vice versa, when ball possession changed.

As a junior in 1951, Fortunato was tabbed first-team All-American and first-team All-SEC.

In his senior season, he was selected honorable mention All-American and All-SEC after leading the Bulldogs with 779 rushing yards and five touchdowns. He became one of the first Bulldogs to rush for over 1,000 yards in a career, scoring six total touchdowns and registering four interceptions.

== Professional career ==
Fortunato was selected in the seventh round of the 1952 NFL draft by the Chicago Bears, 80th overall. He did not join the Bears until the 1955 season due to a military commitment. He became a full-time starter during his rookie season under Hall of Fame coach and team owner George Halas.

Together with fellow linebackers Bill George and Larry Morris, Fortunato formed the Bears' greatest linebacker threesome of all-time. However, after a disappointing season in which the team finished 8-4 and missed the playoffs, Halas decided to step down as head coach.

In February 1956, former Bears quarterback and Hall of Famer, Paddy Driscoll was hired by Halas as his successor as head coach. Driscoll lead the Bears to the NFL Western Division a 9-2-1 record, which was tied for best in the league that year. The Bears lost to the New York Giants in the 1956 NFL Championship game. The 47-7 loss in that game, coupled with a 5-7 season the following year, compelled Halas to reassign Driscoll and return as head coach in February 1958.

Under Halas's leadership, the Bears rebounded by finishing with an 8-4 record in both 1958 and 1959. The Bears continued to win at least eight games in 1960, 1961, and 1962, but missed the playoffs in six consecutive seasons. During the latter stages of the 1962 season, George Allen replaced veteran Clark Shaughnessy as Halas' top defensive assistant, effectively making him the Bears' defensive coordinator.

Allen's presence had a formative effect and in 1963, Fortunato guided the Bears league-leading defense (as captain and signal-caller) in scoring, total, rushing and passing as well as turnovers. After the Bears won the 1963 NFL Championship, Fortunato stood on a chair in the locker room and delivered a short speech on Allen’s importance to the team and tossed him the game ball.

Fortunato led the Bears in tackles for seven consecutive seasons. In addition to his 16 career interceptions, Fortunato also recovered 22 fumbles, which was an NFL record at the time of his retirement. The record stood until Bears teammate Dick Butkus passed him.

During his career, Fortunato played in 155 of 156 possible games, starting 153. The Bears had eight winning seasons in his 12 years.

== Coaching career ==
A knee injury ended Fortunato's playing career shortly before the 1967 NFL season. He stayed on with the Bears as an assistant coach, leading the linebackers in Halas' final season as head coach. He became defensive coordinator after Jim Dooley was elevated to Bears head coach prior to the 1968 season.

== Personal life ==
He left the Bears after one year as defensive coordinator and made his home in Natchez, Mississippi. He owned and operated Big Joe Oil Company, which explored for and drilled wells. He became known for his charity work in Mingo Junction, where a highway was named after him, and Natchez, where he started the Joe Fortunato Celebrity Golf Classic to raise funds for education in Mississippi.

He was a recreational bluegill fisherman.

== Awards and recognition ==
Fortunato played 12 seasons for the Bears (1955–1966), where he served as team captain. He made the Pro Bowl five times, and was named to the NFL 300 Greatest Players team.

Fortunato was inducted into the Mississippi Sports Hall of Fame in 1978 and the National Italian American Sports Hall of Fame in 1990.

In 2017, he was added to Mississippi State University's Ring of Honor on Davis Wade Stadium, which is the highest recognition for Mississippi State Football. He was the seventh Bulldog selected for that honor, following Johnie Cooks, Jack Cristil, Kent Hull, D. D. Lewis, Shorty McWilliams and Jackie Parker.

Also in 2017, the Professional Football Researchers Association named Fortunato to the PFRA Hall of Very Good Class of 2017.

He was a recipient of the Sporting Goods Manufacturers Association (SGMA) HEROES award in 2000 for his founding of the Joe Fortunato Celebrity Golf Classic.

== Death ==
Fortunato died on November 6, 2017. Upon his death, Bears Chairman George McCaskey issued a statement acknowledging that Fortunato "was a key figure in one of the greatest linebacker trios in Bears history alongside Hall of Famers Bill George and Larry Morris."
