= Crockett Technical High School =

Crockett Technical High School can refer to:

- A former name of Memphis Technical High School
- A school in the Detroit Public Schools district
