= Steve Meilinger =

American football player (1930–2015)

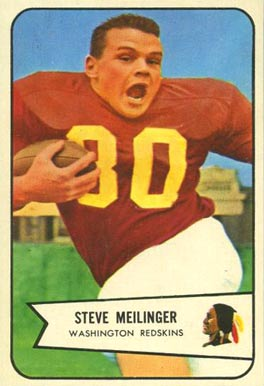
- Meilinger on a 1954 Bowman football card

No. 86, 80, 88
- Position: End

Personal information
- Born: December 12, 1930; Bethlehem, Pennsylvania, U.S.
- Died: September 14, 2015 (aged 84); Lexington, Kentucky, U.S.
- Listed height: 6 ft 2 in (1.88 m)
- Listed weight: 227 lb (103 kg)

Career information
- High school: Liberty (Bethlehem); Fork Union Military Academy (VA)
- College: Kentucky (1950–1953)
- NFL draft: 1954: 1st round, 8th overall pick

Career history
- Washington Redskins (1956–1957); Green Bay Packers (1958–1960); Pittsburgh Steelers (1961); St. Louis Cardinals (1961)*
- * Offseason or practice squad member only

Awards and highlights
- 2× First-team All-American (1952, 1953); 3× First-team All-SEC (1951, 1952, 1953)

Career NFL statistics
- Receptions: 60
- Receiving yards: 863
- Touchdowns: 8
- Stats at Pro Football Reference
- College Football Hall of Fame

Stephen Frank Meilinger (December 12, 1930 – September 14, 2015) was an American professional football end who played professionally in the National Football League before joining the United States Marshals Service, during which time he served as one of the federal officers employed by the United States Federal Witness Protection Program during its early days.

He subsequently rose through the ranks to become chief deputy for the Marshals' Eastern District of Kentucky.

== Biography ==
Meilinger played college football at the University of Kentucky and was drafted in the first round of the 1954 NFL draft. He then went on to a National Football League (NFL) career, playing for the Washington Redskins, the Green Bay Packers, and the Pittsburgh Steelers.

Following his NFL career, Meilinger joined the United States Marshals Service. During his Marshals Service career, he was one of the original agents for the United States Federal Witness Protection Program, and eventually was promoted to chief deputy for the Eastern District of Kentucky, where he served until his retirement.

== Honors ==
In 2014, Meilinger was inducted into the College Football Hall of Fame.

== Death ==
Meilinger died in Lexington, Kentucky, on September 14, 2015, at the age of 84.
