= Jack Shanafelt =

American football player

Profile
- Position: Tackle

Personal information
- Born: c. 1930; Akron, Ohio, U.S.
- Died: April 19, 2013

Career information
- High school: Springfield
- College: Penn
- NFL draft: 1954: 23rd round, 277th overall pick

Awards and highlights
- First-team All-American (1953)

Jack L. Shanafelt (c. 1931 – April 19, 2013) was an American football player. Shanafelt was born in Akron, Ohio, and lived most of his life in Tallmadge, Ohio. He attended the University of Pennsylvania in Philadelphia and played at the tackle position for the Penn Quakers football team. He was selected by the Associated Press and the Football Writers Association of America as a first-team player on their respective 1953 College Football All-America Teams. He then served in the United States Army during the Korean War. He later worked for Goodrich Corporation. He was inducted into the Penn Athletics Hall of Fame. He died in 2013 at age 81.
