= Joe D'Agostino =

American football player

No. 76
- Position: Guard

Career information
- College: Florida (1951–1953)

Awards and highlights
- Third-team All-American (1953); 2× First-team All-SEC (1952, 1953); Second-team All-SEC (1951)

Joseph F. "Joe-joe" D'Agostino Jr. was a college football player. A two-way offensive and defensive guard for the Florida Gators, D'Agostino was an honorable mention All-American and twice received first-team All-SEC honors. He was a key member of the 1952 team's line which blocked for the renowned backfield which included the likes of Rick Casares, Papa Hall, and Buford Long. He was drafted into the NFL in the 15th round of the 1954 NFL draftby the Baltimore Colts, but never played due to injury.

== See also ==
- List of University of Florida Athletic Hall of Fame members
