= George Tarasovic =

American football player (1930–2019)

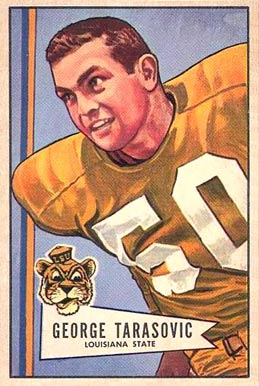
- Tarasovic on a 1952 Bowman football card

No. 50, 82, 53, 52, 65
- Positions: Linebacker, center, defensive end

Personal information
- Born: May 6, 1930; Granville, New York, U.S.
- Died: October 24, 2019 (aged 89); Savannah, Georgia, U.S.
- Listed height: 6 ft 4 in (1.93 m)
- Listed weight: 245 lb (111 kg)

Career information
- High school: Warren Harding (Bridgeport, Connecticut)
- College: Boston College (1949); Northeast Louisiana (1950); LSU (1951)
- NFL draft: 1952: 2nd round, 18th overall pick

Career history
- Pittsburgh Steelers (1952–1953, 1956–1963); Philadelphia Eagles (1963-1965); Denver Broncos (1966)

Awards and highlights
- First-team All-American (1951); First-team All-SEC (1951)

Career NFL/AFL statistics
- Interceptions: 12
- Fumble recoveries: 16
- Sacks: 22.5
- Stats at Pro Football Reference

George Kenneth Tarasovic (May 6, 1930 – October 24, 2019) was an American professional football player of Rusyn or Slovak descent. He played college football for the Boston College Eagles and LSU Tigers. He played 15 years in the National Football League (NFL) with the Pittsburgh Steelers, Philadelphia Eagles, and Denver Broncos.

His father's family was from a village and municipality located in today's northern Slovakia, part of the former Austro-Hungarian Empire.

== College career ==
Tarasovic played one season at Boston College before leaving the school for personal reasons. After one year of junior college at Northeast Louisiana, he transferred to LSU. With the Tigers, he was recognized as an All American offensive lineman and a Southeastern Conference all star as a linebacker.

== Professional career ==
Tarasovic was drafted in the second round of the 1952 NFL draft by the Pittsburgh Steelers. In his rookie season, he started nine games for Pittsburgh, recovering four fumbles.

He played 15 seasons in Pro Football, mainly in the National Football League with the Pittsburgh Steelers. He also spent time with the NFL Philadelphia Eagles and the American Football League's Denver Broncos. He missed the 1954 and 1955 seasons due to military service.

Tarasovic was named to the UPI 2nd team All-NFL squad in 1959, and he is a member of the Western Pennsylvania Football Hall of Fame. Former New York Giants running back Alex Webster called Tarasovic "One of the toughest SOBs I ever played against."

== Personal life ==
George's brother, Phil Tarasovic, was captain of the 1955 Yale Bulldogs football team, and was also drafted by the Pittsburgh Steelers.

During his career, Tarasovic showed an interest in politics, serving as a Democratic Party committeeman. In 1963, he ran for justice of the peace in his town, but was defeated

After he retired, Tarasovic settled in York, Pennsylvania. He later moved to Savannah, Georgia, where he died on October 24, 2019.

== See also ==
- List of American Football League players
