= Carr Central High School =

Location
- Vicksburg, Mississippi; United States of America
- Coordinates: 32.34487443252959°N 90.87870244050931°W

Information
- Established: 1932
- Closed: 1979
- Grades: 9-12th (1932-1959)

Carr Central High School is a historic former high school in Vicksburg, Mississippi. It was also used as a junior high school. The Gothic architecture building was designed by William A. Stanton and constructed in 1924. The school closed in 1979. A historical marker commemorates its history. It is at 1805 Cherry Street and has been renovated for use as an apartment complex. The school was named for John P. Carr, former superintendent of Vicksburg Public Schools.

It was a high school from 1932 to 1959. Alumni recalled the superintendent's office was also in the school. A mural was painted of the school.

In 1952 a 74 page report on the school was published. Photos of the school from 1999 are extant.

== Alumni ==
- George Morris, football player
- Claude King, football player
