= Rex Boggan =

American football player (1930–1985)

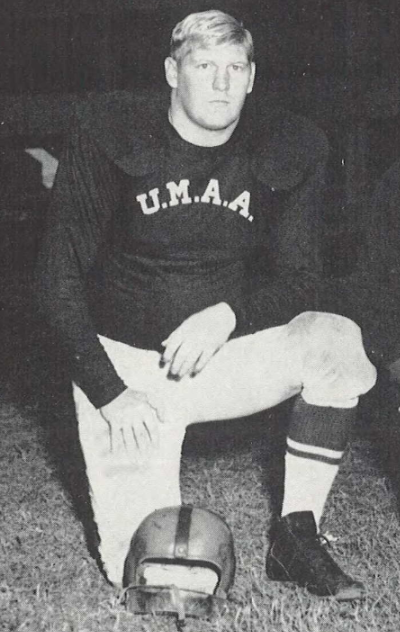
- Boggan from 1955 Ole Miss

No. 73
- Position: Defensive tackle

Personal information
- Born: March 27, 1930; Tupelo, Mississippi, U.S.
- Died: December 8, 1985 (aged 55); Spartanburg, South Carolina, U.S.
- Listed height: 6 ft 4 in (1.93 m)
- Listed weight: 235 lb (107 kg)

Career information
- High school: Memphis (TN) Technical
- College: Ole Miss
- NFL draft: 1952: 20th round, 239th overall pick

Career history
- New York Giants (1955)

Awards and highlights
- First-team All-American (1954); First-team All-SEC (1954)

Career NFL statistics
- Games played: 11
- Stats at Pro Football Reference

Rex Reed Boggan (March 27, 1930 – December 8, 1985) was an American professional football player.

Boggan was born in Tupelo, Mississippi, in 1930. He attended Memphis Technical High School in Memphis, Tennessee.

He attended the University of Mississippi and played college football at the tackle position for the Ole Miss Rebels football team from 1949 to 1950 and in 1954. Between 1950 and 1953, his college career was interrupted by his service in the United States Marine Corps during the Korean War. In December 1953, he was selected as the most valuable player from the Navy and Marine Corps football teams of 1953. As a senior, he led the 1954 Ole Miss Rebels football team to the SEC championship and the No 6 ranking in the final AP poll. He was selected by the Associated Press as a first-team player on its 1954 All-America college football team.

Boggan was drafted 239th overall by the New York Giants in the 20th round of the 1952 NFL draft and played for the Giants during the 1955 season at the defensive tackle position. He appeared in 11 NFL games, all of them as a starter. In August 1956, a large calcium deposit fused the two major bones in his right leg. The condition ended his football career.

Boggan died in 1985 after suffering a heart attack at his home in Spartanburg, South Carolina.
