= Joe O'Malley =

American football player (1932–2015)

No. 85
- Position: Defensive end

Personal information
- Born: January 1, 1932; Scranton, Pennsylvania, U.S.
- Died: March 20, 2015 (aged 83); Montgomery, Alabama, U.S.
- Listed height: 6 ft 3 in (1.91 m)
- Listed weight: 218 lb (99 kg)

Career information
- High school: Scranton Tech
- College: Georgia (1951–1954)
- NFL draft: 1955: 4th round, 47th overall pick

Career history
- Chicago Bears (1955)*; Pittsburgh Steelers (1955–1956)
- * Offseason or practice squad member only

Awards and highlights
- 2× Second-team All-SEC (1952, 1954)

Career NFL statistics
- Fumble recoveries: 3
- Stats at Pro Football Reference

Joseph Patrick O'Malley (January 1, 1932 – March 20, 2015) was an American professional football defensive end who played two seasons with the Pittsburgh Steelers of the National Football League (NFL). He was selected by the Chicago Bears in the fourth round of the 1955 NFL draft. He played college football at the University of Georgia.

== Early life ==
O'Malley played high school football at Scranton Technical High School in Scranton, Pennsylvania. He earned all-scholastic honors and was the player of the game for the 1950 Scranton Lions Club Dream Game. He also participated in basketball and track and field. In basketball, he set several Lackawanna League scoring records, was widely considered one of the top inside players and was named to The Scranton Times All-Regional team twice. O'Malley was undefeated in the high jump his senior season and also competed in the 440-yard dash, broad jump and the shot put.

== College career ==
O'Malley played college football for the Georgia Bulldogs. He earned second-team All-Southeastern Conference honors his sophomore year. He also competed in track and field. He was named a team captain, earned second-team All-Southeastern Conference honors and was an honorable mention All-American his senior year. In 1999, he was inducted into the University of Georgia Hall of Fame.

== Professional career ==
O'Malley was selected by the Chicago Bears in the fourth round with the 47th overall pick in the 1955 NFL draft. He was traded to the Pittsburgh Steelers, appearing in 22 games and starting 9 from 1955 to 1956.

== Coaching career ==
O'Malley became football, basketball, and athletic director at Brown High School in Atlanta, Georgia after his playing career. The basketball team won the AAA state championship in his first year. He was named Class AAA Coach of the Year by the Georgia Athletic Coaches Association in 1968.

== Personal life ==
O'Malley married Sally Dodson in 1956, they had one daughter Shawn O’Malley, then separated and divorced in 1959. He then married schoolteacher Joyce Ervin on August 3, 1960. The couple lived in Conyers, Georgia and had three children Karen, Joseph II and Mike. O'Malley began working at General Wholesale Company in 1970 and retired from the company in 1994. O'Malley was a member of the Holy Spirit Catholic Church in Conyers.

After death, O'Malley was diagnosed with chronic traumatic encephalopathy. He is one of at least 345 NFL players to be diagnosed after death with this disease, which is caused by repeated hits to the head.
