= Lethon Flowers =

American football player (born 1973)

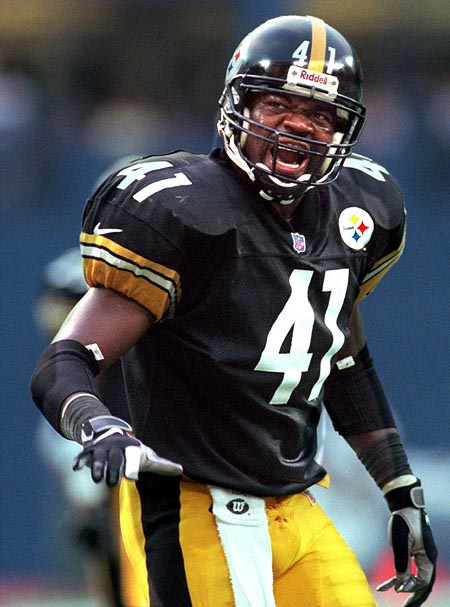

No. 41
- Position: Safety

Personal information
- Born: January 14, 1973 (age 53); Columbia, South Carolina, U.S.
- Listed height: 6 ft 0 in (1.83 m)
- Listed weight: 213 lb (97 kg)

Career information
- High school: Spring Valley (Columbia)
- College: Georgia Tech
- NFL draft: 1995: 5th round, 151st overall pick

Career history
- Pittsburgh Steelers (1995–2002); Denver Broncos (2003)

Awards and highlights
- Second-team All-ACC (1994)

Career NFL statistics
- Tackles: 403
- Interceptions: 4
- Sacks: 12
- Stats at Pro Football Reference

Lethon 'Lee' Flowers (born January 14, 1973) is an American former professional football player who was a safety for eight years in the National Football League (NFL) from 1995 to 2002, primarily with the Pittsburgh Steelers. He was selected in the fifth round of the 1995 NFL draft. He played college football for the Georgia Tech Yellow Jackets.

== Early life ==
Flowers was born in 1973. At age 14, he spent three months in intensive care after a ruptured appendix, and came close to dying.

He played for the Yellow Jackets at Georgia Tech for the 1991 season. He played cornerback in college.

== Professional career ==
=== Pittsburgh Steelers ===
In 1995, he was a fifth-round pick for the NFL draft, joining the Pittsburgh Steelers. In October 1996, he was one of 35 NFL players handed fines from a game involving the Steelers and Houston Oilers, after a series of fights broke out on the field.

In 1996, for the Steelers, he had 30 special teams tackles that season. In 1997, he was special teams captain for the Steelers, although he missed six weeks due to a sprained knee. He signed to a one-year contract in June 1998 with the Steelers. He played as a starter for the Steelers in 1998, and "finished as the Steelers' second-leading tackler with 117 total stops, including 94 solo tackles." The Pittsburgh Steelers re-signed Flowers to a multi-year contract in February 1999. The deal for four years was reportedly worth $10 million.

During his eight year NFL career with the Steelers, he spent his first three years largely playing on special teams, moving into the starting lineup in 1998. In the 2002 season with the Steelers, he played 16 games and registered 58 tackles. He was not resigned.

=== Denver Broncos ===
Flowers was signed by the Denver Broncos in June 2003.

In June 2003, it was announced he'd been suspended without pay for the first four games of the regular season, for violating the NFL's steroid policy. He had a one year deal with the club, and could still participate in training camp and preseason games. The Broncos issued a statement that they knew Flowers would be suspended before they signed him. Flowers said he tested positive for the over-the-counter stimulant ephedra, stemming from a vitamin he'd taken in December without knowing its content. Ephedra had been banned by the NFL since 2001, after the death of Korey Stringer. Flowers said he appealed the suspension in June, but lost a hearing.

The 2003 season with the Broncos was his last in the NFL.

== NFL career statistics ==
Legend
**Bold**	Career high

=== Regular season ===
Year	Team	Games		Tackles				Interceptions				Fumbles			
Year	Team	GP	GS	Comb	Solo	Ast	Sck	Int	Yds	TD	Lng	FF	FR	Yds	TD
1995	PIT	10	0	0	0	0	0.0	0	0	0	0	0	0	0	0
1996	PIT	16	0	3	3	0	0.0	0	0	0	0	0	0	0	0
1997	PIT	10	0	1	1	0	0.0	0	0	0	0	0	1	0	0
1998	PIT	16	16	**101**	**78**	23	1.0	1	2	0	2	3	2	0	0
1999	PIT	15	15	79	64	15	**5.0**	0	0	0	0	1	0	0	0
2000	PIT	14	14	85	61	**24**	1.0	1	0	0	0	**4**	**3**	0	0
2001	PIT	15	15	61	48	13	1.0	0	0	0	0	0	0	0	0
2002	PIT	16	15	73	52	21	4.0	**2**	**31**	0	**25**	0	1	**3**	0
Career		112	75	403	307	96	12.0	4	33	0	25	8	7	3	0

=== Playoffs ===
Year	Team	Games		Tackles				Interceptions				Fumbles			
Year	Team	GP	GS	Comb	Solo	Ast	Sck	Int	Yds	TD	Lng	FF	FR	Yds	TD
1995	PIT	3	0	1	1	0	0.0	0	0	0	0	0	0	0	0
1996	PIT	2	0	1	1	0	0.0	0	0	0	0	0	0	0	0
1997	PIT	2	0	2	2	0	0.0	0	0	0	0	0	0	0	0
2001	PIT	2	2	13	7	**6**	0.0	0	0	0	0	0	0	0	0
2002	PIT	2	2	**21**	**15**	**6**	0.0	0	0	0	0	0	**1**	0	0
Career		11	4	38	26	12	0.0	0	0	0	0	0	1	0	0

== See also ==
- List of Georgia Institute of Technology athletes
- List of Georgia Tech Yellow Jackets in the NFL draft
- List of suspensions in the NFL
