= 1953 All-America college football team =

Official list of the best college football players of 1953

The 1953 All-America college football team is composed of college football players who were selected as All-Americans by various organizations and writers that chose All-America college football teams in 1953. The eight selectors recognized by the NCAA as "official" for the 1953 season are (1) the Associated Press, (2) the United Press, (3) the All-America Board, (4) the American Football Coaches Association (AFCA), (5) the Football Writers Association of America (FWAA), (6) the International News Service (INS), (7) the Newspaper Enterprise Association (NEA), and (8) the Sporting News.

== Consensus All-Americans ==
For the year 1953, the NCAA recognizes eight published All-American teams as "official" designations for purposes of its consensus determinations. The following chart identifies the NCAA-recognized consensus All-Americans and displays which first-team designations they received.

Name	Position	School	Number	Official	Other
Stan Jones	Tackle	Maryland	8/8	AAB, AFCA, AP, FWAA, INS, NEA, SN, UP	WC
Johnny Lattner	Halfback	Notre Dame	7/8	AAB, AFCA, AP, FWAA, INS, SN, UP	WC
J. D. Roberts	Guard	Oklahoma	7/8	AAB, AP, FWAA, INS, NEA, SN, UP	WC
Paul Giel	Quarterback	Minnesota	7/8	AAB, AFCA, AP, FWAA, INS, SN, UP	WC
Don Dohoney	End	Michigan State	6/8	AFCA, AP, FWAA, NEA, SN, UP	WC
Crawford Mims	Guard	Mississippi	6/8	AFCA, AP, FWAA, NEA, SN, UP	WC
Paul Cameron	Halfback	UCLA	6/8	AAB, AFCA, AP, FWAA, INS, SN, UP	WC
Carlton Massey	End	Texas	5/8	AAB, FWAA, INS, SN, UP	WC
Art Hunter	Tackle	Notre Dame	5/8	AAB, FWAA, INS, SN, UP	WC
Larry Morris	Center	Georgia Tech	5/8	AAB, AFCA, AP, SN, UP	WC
J. C. Caroline	Halfback	Illinois	3/8	AFCA, FWAA, UP	WC

== All-American selections for 1953 ==
=== Ends ===
- Don Dohoney, Michigan State (AFCA; AP-1; FWAA; NEA-1; SN; UP-1; WC)
- Carlton Massey, Texas (AAB; AP-2; FWAA; INS; NEA-3; SN; UP-1; WC)
- Steve Meilinger, Kentucky (AAB; AFCA; AP-2; NEA-1; UP-3)
- Sam Morley, Stanford (AP-1; NEA-2; UP-2)
- John Carson, Georgia (UP-3; FWAA; NEA-3)
- Ken Buck, Pacific (FWAA)
- Joe Collier, Northwestern (INS)
- Don Penza, Notre Dame (UP-2)
- Dick Deitrick, Pittsburgh (NEA-2)
- Clyde Bennett, South Carolina (AP-3)
- Gary Knafelc, Colorado (AP-3)

=== Tackles ===
- Stan Jones, Maryland (College and Pro Football Hall of Fame) (AAB; AFCA; AP-1; FWAA; INS; NEA-1; SN; UP-1; WC)
- Art Hunter, Notre Dame (AAB; AP-2; FWAA; INS; NEA-2; SN; UP-1; WC)
- Jack Shanafelt, Pennsylvania (AP-1; FWAA; NEA-3)
- Ed Meadows, Duke (FWAA; NEA-3; UP-2)
- Jim Ray Smith, Baylor (AFCA; AP-3; UP-2)
- John Hudson, Rice (NEA-1)
- Sid Fournet, LSU (AP-2)
- Bob Farris, Army (NEA-2)
- George Jacoby, Ohio State (AP-3; UP-3)
- Eldred Kraemer, Pittsburgh (UP-3)

=== Guards ===
- J. D. Roberts, Oklahoma (Outland Trophy and College Football Hall of Fame) (AAB; AP-1; FWAA; INS; NEA-1; SN; UP-1; WC)
- Crawford Mims, Mississippi (AFCA; AP-1; FWAA; NEA-1; SN; UP-1; WC)
- Bob Fleck, Syracuse (AFCA; INS)
- Milt Bohart, Washington (AP-2; FWAA; NEA-2; UP-2)
- Ray Correll, Kentucky (FWAA; NEA-2)
- Steve Eisenhauer, Navy (AAB; UP-2)
- Gene Lamone, West Virginia (AP-2)
- Morgan Williams, Texas Christian (AP-3)
- Bob Burrows, Duke (AP-3)
- John Bauer, Illinois (NEA-3)
- George Timberlake, Southern California (NEA-3)
- Norm Manoogian, Stanford (UP-3)
- Joe D'Agostino, Florida (UP-3)

=== Centers ===
- Larry Morris, Georgia Tech (College Football Hall of Fame) (AAB; AFCA; AP-1; NEA-2; SN; UP-1; WC)
- Matt Hazeltine, California (FWAA; INS; UP-2)
- Jerry Hilgenberg, Iowa (AP-2; FWAA; NEA-3)
- Bob Orders, West Virginia (NEA-1; UP-3)
- Steve Korcheck, George Washington (AP-3)

=== Quarterbacks ===
- Paul Giel, Minnesota (College Football Hall of Fame) (AAB; AFCA; AP-1; FWAA; INS; SN; UP-1; WC)
- Bernie Faloney, Maryland (AAB; AP-2; INS; NEA-2; UP-2)
- Jackie Parker, Mississippi State (AP-3; FWAA; NEA-3; UP-3)
- Bobby Garrett, Stanford (AP-2; FWAA; UP-2)
- Zeke Bratkowski, Georgia (UP-3)
- George Shaw, Oregon (AP-3)

=== Halfbacks ===
- Johnny Lattner, Notre Dame (Heisman Trophy winner and College Football Hall of Fame) (AAB; AFCA; AP-1; FWAA; INS; SN; UP-1; WC)
- Paul Cameron, UCLA (AAB; AFCA; AP-1; FWAA; INS; NEA-2; SN; UP-1; WC)
- J. C. Caroline, Illinois (College Football Hall of Fame) (AFCA; AP-2; FWAA; NEA-2; UP-1; WC)
- Leroy Bolden, Michigan State (NEA-3; UP-2)
- Bobby Cavazos, Texas Tech (AP-2)
- Dick Clasby, Harvard (AP-3)
- Larry Grigg, Oklahoma (NEA-3)
- Neil Worden, Notre Dame (UP-3)
- Leon Hardeman, Georgia Tech (UP-3)

=== Fullbacks ===
- Kosse Johnson, Rice (AP-1; FWAA; NEA-2)
- Alan Ameche, Wisconsin (AP-3; FWAA; UP-2)
- Tommy Allman, West Virginia (NEA-3)

== Key ==
- **Bold** – Consensus All-American
- -1 – First-team selection
- -2 – Second-team selection
- -3 – Third-team selection

=== Official selectors ===
- AAB = All-America Board
- AFCA = American Football Coaches Association, for Collier's Weekly magazine
- AP = Associated Press
- FWAA = Football Writers Association of America
- INS = International News Service
- NEA = Newspaper Enterprise Association
- SN = The Sporting News: selected "by 150 sportswriters and broadcasters"
- UP = United Press: "selected by 265 sports writers and broadcasters in a nationwide ballot"

=== Other selectors ===
- WC = Walter Camp Football Foundation

== See also ==
- 1953 All-Atlantic Coast Conference football team
- 1953 All-Big Seven Conference football team
- 1953 All-Big Ten Conference football team
- 1953 All-Pacific Coast Conference football team
- 1953 All-SEC football team
- 1953 All-Southwest Conference football team
