= Jerry Helluin =

American football player (1929–2017)

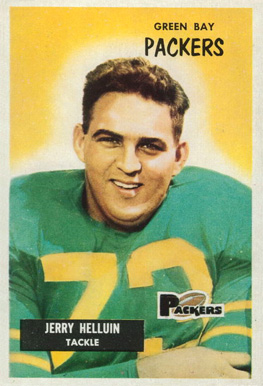
- Helluin on a 1955 Bowman football card

No. 79, 72
- Position: Defensive tackle

Personal information
- Born: August 8, 1929; Houma, Louisiana, U.S.
- Died: October 18, 2017 (aged 88); Houma, Louisiana, U.S.
- Listed height: 6 ft 2 in (1.88 m)
- Listed weight: 272 lb (123 kg)

Career information
- High school: Donaldsonville (LA) Catholic
- College: Tulane
- NFL draft: 1951: 3rd round, 38th overall pick

Career history
- Cleveland Browns (1952–1953); Green Bay Packers (1954–1957); Houston Oilers (1960)

Awards and highlights
- AFL champion (1960); Second-team All-SEC (1951)

Career NFL/AFL statistics
- Fumble recoveries: 8
- Interceptions: 1
- Total touchdowns: 1
- Stats at Pro Football Reference

Francis Jerome "Jerry" Helluin (August 8, 1929 - October 18, 2017) was an American professional football player who played defensive tackle for seven seasons for the Cleveland Browns, Green Bay Packers, and Houston Oilers.

== Biography ==
Jerry Helluin was born August 8, 1929, in Houma, Louisiana and played college football at Tulane University.

He was drafted in the third round of the 1951 NFL draft by the Cleveland Browns, who made him the 38th overall selection of the draft. A defensive specialist, Helluin spent the 1952 and 1953 seasons playing defensive tackle and middle guard for the Browns.

He was traded to the Green Bay Packers ahead of the 1954 season. He would spend the next four years for the Packers as the starting left defensive tackle, concluding at the end of the 1957 season.

During the off-season, Helluin worked for the United States Postal Service.

Helluin died on October 18, 2017, at the age of 88.
