= Jess Richardson =

American football player (1930–1975)

No. 65, 72, 75
- Position: Defensive tackle

Personal information
- Born: August 18, 1930; Philadelphia, Pennsylvania, U.S.
- Died: June 17, 1975 (aged 44); Philadelphia, Pennsylvania, U.S.
- Listed height: 6 ft 2 in (1.88 m)
- Listed weight: 261 lb (118 kg)

Career information
- High school: Roxborough (Philadelphia)
- College: Alabama (1949–1952)
- NFL draft: 1953: 8th round, 93rd overall pick

Career history

Playing
- Philadelphia Eagles (1953–1961); Boston Patriots (1962-1964)

Coaching
- Boston Patriots (1965–1970) Defensive line coach; Philadelphia Eagles (1972) Defensive line

Awards and highlights
- NFL champion (1960); Pro Bowl (1959); Second-team All-SEC (1951)

Career NFL/AFL statistics
- Fumble recoveries: 5
- Sacks: 7.5
- Interceptions: 1
- Stats at Pro Football Reference

Jesse William Richardson (August 18, 1930 – June 17, 1975) was an American collegiate and professional American football player who played defensive lineman in the National Football League (NFL) for the Philadelphia Eagles, and in the American Football League (AFL) for the Boston Patriots. Richardson played college football at the University of Alabama and was drafted 93rd overall in the eighth round of the 1953 NFL draft. He returned to the Eagles in 1972 as defensive line coach, but was let go at the end of the season, along with the rest of the coaching staff.

He was the last lineman to have played without a face mask. He died on June 17, 1975, from kidney disease.

== See also ==
- List of American Football League players
