= 1953 All-SEC football team =

American college football all-star team

The 1953 All-SEC football team consists of American football players selected to the All-Southeastern Conference (SEC) chosen by various selectors for the 1953 college football season. Alabama won the conference.

== All-SEC selections ==
=== Ends ===
- John Carson, Georgia (AP-1, UP-1)
- Jim Pyburn, Auburn (AP-1, UP-1)
- Roger Ratroff, Tennessee (AP-2, UP-2)
- Joe Tuminello, LSU (AP-2)
- Sam Hensley, Georgia Tech (UP-2)
- Mack Franklin, Tennessee (UP-3)
- Bud Willis, Alabama (UP-3)

=== Tackles ===
- Sid Fournet, LSU (AP-1, UP-1)
- Frank D'Agostino, Auburn (AP-1, UP-3)
- Bob Fisher, Tennessee (AP-2, UP-1)
- Bob Sherman, Georgia Tech (AP-2, UP-3)
- Ed Culpepper, Alabama (UP-2)
- George Mason, Alabama (UP-2)

=== Guards ===
- Crawford Mims, Ole Miss (AP-1, UP-1)
- Ray Correll, Kentucky (AP-1, UP-2)
- Joe D'Agostino, Florida (AP-2, UP-1)
- George Atkins, Auburn (AP-2, UP-3)
- Orville Vernon, Georgia Tech (UP-2)
- Al Robetot, Tulane (UP-3)

=== Centers ===
- Larry Morris, Georgia Tech (AP-1, UP-1)
- Ralph Carrigan, Alabama (AP-2, UP-3)
- Hal Easterwood, Miss. St. (UP-2)

=== Quarterbacks ===
- Jackie Parker, Miss. St. (College Football Hall of Fame) (AP-1, UP-1 [as hb])
- Zeke Bratkowski, Georgia (AP-2, UP-1)
- Jimmy Wade, Tennessee (AP-2, UP-2)
- Tommy Lewis, Alabama (UP-3)

=== Halfbacks ===
- Corky Tharp, Alabama (AP-1, UP-1)
- Leon Hardeman, Georgia Tech (AP-2, UP-2)
- Ralph Paolone, Kentucky (AP-2)
- Billy Teas, Georgia Tech (UP-2)
- Bobby Freeman, Auburn (UP-3)
- Jerry Morehand, LSU (UP-3)

=== Fullbacks ===
- Steve Meilinger, Kentucky (College Football Hall of Fame) (AP-1, UP-1)
- Glenn Turner, Georgia Tech (AP-1, UP-2)
- Haral Lofton, Ole Miss (UP-3)

== Key ==
AP = Associated Press

UP = United Press.

Bold = Consensus first-team selection by both AP and UP

== See also ==
- 1953 College Football All-America Team
