= William A. Stanton (architect) =

American architect (1870–1948)

William A. Stanton, Sr.
- Born: July 17, 1870; Minden, Louisiana
- Died: August 19, 1948; Vicksburg, Mississippi

William A. Stanton, Sr. (July 17, 1870 – August 19, 1948) was an American architect who was active in Vicksburg, Mississippi.

== Life and career ==
The son of William Stanton and his wife Susanna Parnell Tooley Stanton, William A. Stanton was born in Minden, Louisiana on July 17, 1870. His mother was from England and his father was from Natchez, Mississippi. His father was educated as an architect in St. Louis before serving in the Confederate States Army during the American Civil War. He was wounded at the Battle of Shiloh. His father worked as a builder and architect first in Natchez and later in Vicksburg.

William A. Stanton began working alongside his father as an architect as early as 1890. He formerly trained as an architect at Cornell University; studying there from 1891-1893. He returned to Vicksburg where he joined his father's firm. He remained in Vicksburg for the rest of his life where he worked as an architect and also raised a family. He and his wife had two sons and three daughters.

With his father Stanton built several structure of prominence in Vicksburg; among them the Warren County Jail (1906) and the old Pythian Hall (1907). Alone he designed and built Carr Central High School (1924; originally Carr Junior High School) in the South Cherry Street Historic District (Vicksburg, Mississippi), and the Talullah Book Club Building (1930). He also designed several houses in the South Cherry and Drummond streets neighborhood.

Stanton died in Vicksburg on August 19, 1948.
