= 1954 All-SEC football team =

American college football all-star team

The 1954 All-SEC football team consists of American football players selected to the All-Southeastern Conference (SEC) chosen by various selectors for the 1954 college football season. Ole Miss won the conference.

== All-SEC selections ==
=== Ends ===
- Jim Pyburn, Auburn (AP-1, UP)
- Henry Hair, Georgia Tech (AP-1, UP)
- Joe O'Malley, Georgia (AP-2)
- Joe Tuminello, LSU (AP-2)
- Howard Schnellenberger, Kentucky (AP-3)
- Ray Brown, Florida (AP-3)

=== Tackles ===
- Sid Fournet, LSU (AP-1, UP)
- Darris McCord, Tennessee (AP-2, UP)
- Rex Boggan, Ole Miss (AP-1)
- Frank D'Agostino, Auburn (AP-2)
- George Mason, Alabama (AP-3)
- Pud Mosteller, Georgia (AP-3)

=== Guards ===
- Franklin Brooks, Georgia Tech (AP-1, UP)
- Bobby Goodall, Vanderbilt (AP-1, UP)
- Don Shea, Georgia (AP-2)
- Bryan Borathorne, Tulane (AP-2)
- George Atkins, Auburn (AP-3)
- Bill Dooley, Miss. St. (AP-3)

=== Centers ===
- Larry Morris, Georgia Tech (AP-2, UP)
- Hal Easterwood, Miss. St. (AP-1)
- Steve DeLaTore, Florida (AP-3)

=== Quarterbacks ===
- Eagle Day, Ole Miss (AP-2, UP)
- Bob Hardy, Kentucky (AP-1)
- Bobby Freeman, Auburn (AP-3)

=== Halfbacks ===
- Art Davis, Miss. St. (AP-1, UP)
- Tom Tracy, Tennessee (AP-1, UP [as fb])
- Corky Tharp, Alabama (AP-2, UP)
- Allen Muirhead, Ole Miss (AP-2)
- Charley Horton, Vanderbilt (AP-3)
- Jimmy Thompson, Georgia Tech (AP-3)

=== Fullbacks ===
- Joe Childress, Auburn (AP-1)
- Mal Hammack, Florida (AP-2)
- Bobby Garrad, Georgia (AP-3)

== Key ==
AP = Associated Press.

UP = United Press.

Bold = Consensus first-team selection by both AP and UP

== See also ==
- 1954 College Football All-America Team
