= Claude King (American football) =

American football player (1938–2024)

No. 46, 41
- Position: Halfback

Personal information
- Born: December 3, 1938; Lake Providence, Louisiana, U.S.
- Died: August 16, 2024 (aged 85); Hitchcock, Texas, U.S.
- Listed height: 5 ft 11 in (1.80 m)
- Listed weight: 185 lb (84 kg)

Career information
- High school: Carr Central (Vicksburg, Mississippi)
- College: Houston (1956–1959)
- NFL draft: 1960: 18th round, 212th overall pick
- AFL draft: 1960

Career history
- Houston Oilers (1961); Boston Patriots (1962)

Awards and highlights
- AFL champion (1961)

Career AFL statistics
- Rushing yards: 194
- Rushing average: 5.9
- Receptions: 8
- Receiving yards: 125
- Total touchdowns: 4
- Stats at Pro Football Reference

Claude Robert King Jr. (December 3, 1938 – August 16, 2024) was an American professional football halfback in the National Football League (NFL). He went to high school in Vicksburg, Mississippi. He played for the Houston Oilers and the Boston Patriots. He rushed for 194 yards and three touchdowns during his two-year professional career.

King attended Carr Central High School where he was a football and sprinting star. He was heavily recruited and chose the University of Houston where he was part of its storied rivalry with Ole Miss. King died in Hitchcock, Texas on August 16, 2024, at the age of 85.
