= Sid Fournet =

American football player (1932–2011)

No. 68, 72, 57, 62
- Positions: Tackle, guard, end, linebacker, defensive back

Personal information
- Born: August 27, 1932; Bogalusa, Louisiana, U.S.
- Died: April 23, 2011 (aged 78); Slidell, Louisiana, U.S.
- Listed height: 6 ft 0 in (1.83 m)
- Listed weight: 235 lb (107 kg)

Career information
- High school: Bogalusa
- College: LSU
- NFL draft: 1955: 2nd round, 20th overall pick

Career history
- Los Angeles Rams (1955–1956); Pittsburgh Steelers (1957); Dallas Texans (1960–1961); New York Titans (1962–1963)

Awards and highlights
- Consensus All-American (1954); Second-team All-American (1953); 2× First-team All-SEC (1953, 1954); Second-team All-SEC (1951)

Career NFL/AFL statistics
- Games played: 85
- Games started: 44
- Interceptions: 1
- Stats at Pro Football Reference

Sidney Fredrick Fournet (August 27, 1932 – April 23, 2011) was an American professional football player who was a defensive lineman for three seasons with the Los Angeles Rams, and Pittsburgh Steelers of the National Football League (NFL), and two seasons each for the American Football League (AFL)'s Dallas Texans, and New York Titans. A two-way lineman who played college football as a guard and tackle in college for the LSU Tigers, he was named to the 1954 College All-America team and was a two-time, first-team All-Southeastern Conference selection. He was drafted in the second round with the 20th overall pick in the 1955 NFL draft by the Rams.

== See also ==
- List of American Football League players
- 1954 College Football All-America Team
