= Gordon Polofsky =

American football player (1931–2013)

No. 60
- Positions: Linebacker, guard

Personal information
- Born: January 10, 1931; Providence, Rhode Island, U.S.
- Died: October 7, 2013 (aged 82); Knoxville, Tennessee, U.S.
- Listed height: 6 ft 1 in (1.85 m)
- Listed weight: 219 lb (99 kg)

Career information
- High school: Cranston (RI)
- College: Tennessee
- NFL draft: 1952: 5th round, 61st overall pick

Career history
- Chicago Cardinals (1952–1954)

Awards and highlights
- Second-team All-SEC (1951)

Career NFL statistics
- Games played: 26
- Games started: 20
- Fumble recoveries: 3
- Stats at Pro Football Reference

Gordon Polofsky (January 10, 1931 – October 7, 2013) was an American professional football linebacker and guard. He played for the Chicago Cardinals from 1952 to 1954. He was selected by the Los Angeles Rams in the fifth round of the 1952 NFL draft with the 65th overall pick.

He died on October 7, 2013, in Knoxville, Tennessee at age 82.
