= Johnny Carson (American football) =

American football player (1930–2009)

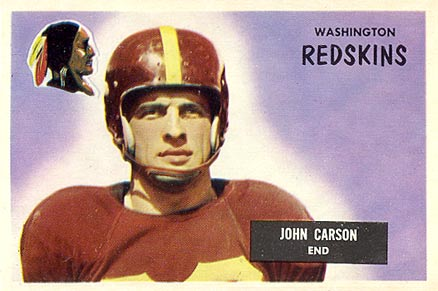
- Carson on a 1955 Bowman football card

No. 82
- Position: Tight end

Personal information
- Born: January 31, 1930; Atlanta, Georgia, U.S.
- Died: April 1, 2009 (aged 79); Atlanta, Georgia, U.S.
- Listed height: 6 ft 3 in (1.91 m)
- Listed weight: 202 lb (92 kg)

Career information
- College: Georgia
- NFL draft: 1953: 15th round, 179th overall pick

Career history
- Washington Redskins (1954–1959); Houston Oilers (1960)

Awards and highlights
- AFL champion (1960); Pro Bowl (1957); First-team All-American (1953); First-team All-SEC (1953)

Career NFL/AFL statistics
- Receptions: 173
- Receiving yards: 2,591
- Receiving touchdowns: 15
- Stats at Pro Football Reference

Johnny Richard Carson Sr. (January 31, 1930 – April 1, 2009) was an American professional football player who was a tight end for the Washington Redskins of the National Football League (NFL) from 1953 to 1959. He also played for the Houston Oilers of the American Football League (AFL) during their inaugural season in 1960. He played college football for the Georgia Bulldogs, earning first-team All-American honors in 1953. Carson was selected in the 15th round of the 1953 NFL draft by the Cleveland Browns.

He died Wednesday, April 1, 2009, at Abbey Hospice in Social Circle.

== NFL/AFL career statistics ==
Legend
| | Won the AFL championship |
| **Bold** | Career high |

=== Regular season ===
| Year | Team | Games | | Receiving | | | | |
| Year | Team | GP | GS | Rec | Yds | Avg | Lng | TD |
|---|---|---|---|---|---|---|---|---|
| 1954 | WAS | 12 | 4 | 12 | 139 | 11.6 | 42 | 0 |
| 1955 | WAS | 12 | 12 | 23 | 443 | **19.3** | **51** | 3 |
| 1956 | WAS | 12 | 11 | 39 | 504 | 12.9 | 26 | 3 |
| 1957 | WAS | 12 | 12 | 34 | 583 | 17.1 | 38 | 3 |
| 1958 | WAS | 4 | 4 | 14 | 244 | 17.4 | 28 | 2 |
| 1959 | WAS | 5 | 2 | 6 | 74 | 12.3 | 17 | 0 |
| 1960 | HOU | 14 | 14 | **45** | **604** | 13.4 | 47 | **4** |
| | | 71 | 59 | 173 | 2,591 | 15.0 | 51 | 15 |

=== Playoffs ===
| Year | Team | Games | | Receiving | | | | |
| Year | Team | GP | GS | Rec | Yds | Avg | Lng | TD |
|---|---|---|---|---|---|---|---|---|
| 1960 | HOU | 1 | 1 | 1 | 13 | 13.0 | 13 | 0 |
| | | 1 | 1 | 1 | 13 | 13.0 | 13 | 0 |

== See also ==
- List of NCAA major college football yearly receiving leaders
