= Kline Gilbert =

American football player (1930–1987)

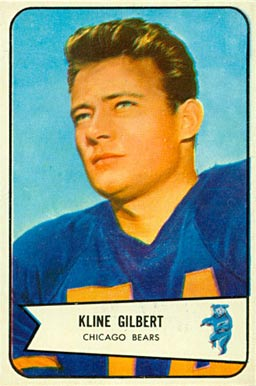
- Gilbert on a 1954 Bowman football card

No. 74, 62
- Positions: Tackle, guard

Personal information
- Born: November 22, 1930; Hollandale, Mississippi, U.S.
- Died: June 14, 1987 (aged 56); Jackson, Mississippi, U.S.
- Listed height: 6 ft 2 in (1.88 m)
- Listed weight: 233 lb (106 kg)

Career information
- College: Ole Miss
- NFL draft: 1953: 6th round, 68th overall pick

Career history
- Chicago Bears (1953–1957)

Awards and highlights
- Pro Bowl (1957); First-team All-American (1952); First-team All-SEC (1952); Ole Miss Athletics Hall of Fame (1988)

Career NFL statistics
- Games played: 60
- Games started: 60
- Fumble recoveries: 3
- Stats at Pro Football Reference

Kline Gilbert (November 22, 1930 – June 14, 1987) was an American professional football player who was an offensive tackle for the Chicago Bears in the National Football League (NFL) from 1953 to 1957. He played college football for the Ole Miss Rebels.

Gilbert made the Pro Bowl in 1957, but was traded in the offseason to the Los Angeles Rams for Bob Carey and Jesse Whittenton. He refused to report to the Rams and retired soon after.
