= Tommy Adkins =

American gridiron football player (1932–2013)

Profile
- Positions: Center, Linebacker

Personal information
- Born: May 7, 1932; Corbin, Kentucky, U.S.
- Died: July 8, 2013 (aged 81); Oak Ridge, Tennessee, U.S.
- Listed height: 6 ft 1 in (1.85 m)
- Listed weight: 210 lb (95 kg)

Career information
- College: Kentucky
- NFL draft: 1954: 17th round, 197th overall pick

Career history
- 1954: Toronto Argonauts

Awards and highlights
- Second-team All-SEC (1952)

Thomas Joseph Adkins Jr. (May 7, 1932 – July 8, 2013) was an American football center and linebacker who played for the Toronto Argonauts of the Canadian Football League (CFL). He appeared in 12 regular-season games and recorded two interceptions during the 1954 season. Before joining the Argonauts, Adkins was selected in the 17th round of the 1954 NFL draft by the Baltimore Colts with the 197th overall pick. However, he never played with the Colts during the regular-season games. Adkins died in Oak Ridge, Tennessee, on July 8, 2013, at the age of 81.
