= Hal Easterwood =

American football player (1932–2005)

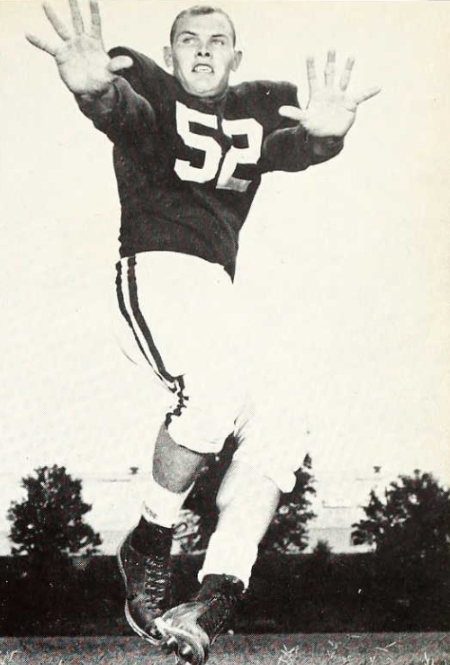
- Easterwood from 1954 Miss. St. yearbook

No. 52
- Position: Center

Personal information
- Born: October 14, 1932; Franklin, Mississippi, U.S.
- Died: August 13, 2005 (age 72); Laurel, Mississippi, U.S.

Career information
- High school: Eupora (MS)
- College: Mississippi State
- NFL draft: 1954: 12th round, 143rd overall pick

Career history
- Mississippi State Bulldogs (1954)

Awards and highlights
- First-team All-American (1954); First-team All-SEC (1954); Second-team All-SEC (1953)

Harold Boyd Easterwood (October 14, 1932 - August 13, 2005), sometimes known by the nickname "Cubby", was an American football player. He played at the center and linebacker positions at Mississippi State from 1952 to 1954 and was selected as a first-team All-American in 1954.

== Early life ==
Easterwood was born in 1932 and grew up in Eupora, Mississippi. He attended Eupora High School where he lettered in football, basketball, baseball and track.

== Mississippi State ==
Easterwood enrolled at Mississippi State and played on the freshman football team in 1950. His college career was interrupted by military service during the Korean War. He returend to Mississippi State in 1952, playing at the center/linebacker position for the Mississippi State Bulldogs football team from 1952 to 1954. In October 1954, he led the Bulldogs to an upset victory over Alabama and was selected by Associated Press as its national Lineman of the week. He was an All-SEC player in both 1953 and 1954. He was also selected by the Football Writers Association of America (FWAA) as the first-team center on its 1954 All-America college football team. He was also an academic All-American and was selected as "Mr. Mississippi State" in 1955. The residents of his hometown of Eupora also held a "Harold Easterwood Day" on March 1, 1955. Mississippi State head coach Darrell Royal said of Easterwood: "I am proud I coached Cubby. He's a fierce player, a fighting competitor and also a good Christian."

== Coaching and later years ==
Easterwood was drafted by the San Francisco 49ers in the 12th round of the 1954 NFL draft, but he did not pass the physical due to back and knee injuries sustained in his senior year. He returned to Mississippi and pursued a career in coaching. He began his coaching career as the line coach at Lee High School in Columbus, Mississippi, then serving as head coach from 1956 to 1960. He then moved to Gardiner High School in Laurel, Mississippi, where he football coach, track coach, and a teacher until 1965. He remained with the Laurel schools after 1965 as a counselor and assistant principal. He later explained his transition from coaching to counseling: "They cut my hours and doubled my pay, so of course I did it."

Easterwood was inducted into both the Mississippi State Hall of Fame and the Mississippi Sports Hall of Fame, the latter honor being bestowed in March 2005. He died five months later in August 2005 in Hattiesburg, Mississippi at age 72.
