= Charlie LaPradd =

American football player and college president (1927–2006)

No. 75
- Position: Tackle

Personal information
- Born: August 24, 1927; St. Augustine, Florida, U.S.
- Died: February 1, 2006 (aged 78); Gainesville, Florida, U.S.
- Listed height: 6 ft 3 in (1.91 m)
- Listed weight: 215 lb (98 kg)

Career information
- High school: Ketterlinus
- College: Florida (1950–1952)

Awards and highlights
- First-team All-American (1952); First-team All-SEC (1952); Second-team All-SEC (1951); Third-team All-SEC (1950); Florida–Georgia Hall of Fame; University of Florida Athletic Hall of Fame

Charles W. LaPradd (August 24, 1927 – February 1, 2006) was an American football player during the early 1950s. He played college football for the University of Florida and was recognized as an All-American as a defensive lineman. He later served as the president of St. Johns River Community College in northeast Florida.

== Early life ==
LaPradd was born and raised in St. Augustine, Florida, in a family of nine children and modest means. He attended Ketterlinus High School in St. Augustine, where he lettered in football, baseball and basketball, but left school to join the United States Army before graduation. After serving in the U.S. Army paratroops, he returned to Ketterlinus to finish his remaining high school diploma requirements.

== College career ==
LaPradd attended the University of Florida in Gainesville, Florida, where he played for coach Bob Woodruff's Florida Gators football team from 1950 to 1952. He had hitch-hiked to Gainesville for a chance to try out for the Florida Gators football team. He initially played for the Gators as a freshman walk-on in 1949, after convincing the coaches to permit him to try out for the squad, and later earned an athletic scholarship. As was typical of college football in the 1950s, when the rules required athletes to play both offense and defense and permitted only limited substitutions, he played tackle on both the offensive and defensive lines.

He was a third-team All-Southeastern Conference (SEC) selection as a sophomore in 1950, and a second-team All-SEC pick following his junior season in 1951. He was married and had an infant son during his senior year, and was a member of Pi Kappa Phi Fraternity (Alpha Epsilon chapter).

At six feet, three inches tall and 215 pounds, he was the lightest tackle on the team as a senior in 1952. Nevertheless, he was described by his teammates as a "man among boys," stronger and more physically mature at 25 years old than most opposing players. He was one of two senior team captains and the defensive leader of the Gators. The Gators' 1952 season was a season of firsts for the team. Led by LaPradd, the Gators dominated the rival Georgia Bulldogs 33–0 in the annual Florida–Georgia football rivalry game in Jacksonville, which would remain the Gators' largest victory over the Bulldogs for almost forty years. Afterward, the team received its first-ever NCAA-sanctioned invitation to a bowl game, the 1953 Gator Bowl, in which the Gators defeated the Tulsa Golden Hurricane 14–13 on January 1, 1953. The Gators finished their season 8–3, their first eight-win season since 1928, and ranked No. 15 in the country by the Associated Press, their first-ever national ranking in the final AP Poll.

Following the season, LaPradd was a first-team All-SEC selection and received first-team All-American honors from the Associated Press and the New York Daily News. He was the Gators' only All-America first team member since Dale Van Sickel in 1928. Coach Woodruff would later recall LaPradd, the former walk-on who had to plead for a chance to try out for the team, as the Gators' greatest lineman of the 1950s. The Green Bay Packers selected LaPradd in the 1952 NFL draft, but he injured his legs in a car accident on the day he graduated from college and never had the opportunity to play in the National Football League.

He graduated from the University of Florida with a bachelor's degree in physical education in 1953.

== Life after football ==
While earning his master's degree in secondary school administration and his doctoral degree in higher education administration from Florida State University in Tallahassee, Florida, he worked as a graduate assistant coach for the Florida State Seminoles football team. Afterward, he served as an assistant coach for the Seminoles for four seasons from 1957 to 1961, and the FSU dean of men for two years. He later served as the president of the three-campus St. Johns River Community College in Orange Park, Palatka and St. Augustine from 1966 to 1972. After resigning from SJRCC in 1972, he went into private business and established a regional beer distributorship based in Gainesville.

== Legacy ==
LaPradd is a "Gator Great" member of the University of Florida Athletic Hall of Fame, and was inducted into the Florida-Georgia Hall of Fame in 1998. In 2006, The Gainesville Sun ranked LaPradd twenty-first on its all-time list of the 100 greatest Florida Gators football players from the team's first 100 years of play.

LaPradd died February 1, 2006; he was 78 years old. He was survived by his son and daughter. After his death, friends, teammates and admirers endowed the Dr. Charles W. LaPradd Ph.D. Fellowship Fund at the University of Florida for the benefit of doctoral candidates in the university's College of Health and Human Performance.
