= Zeke Bratkowski =

American football player and coach (1931–2019)

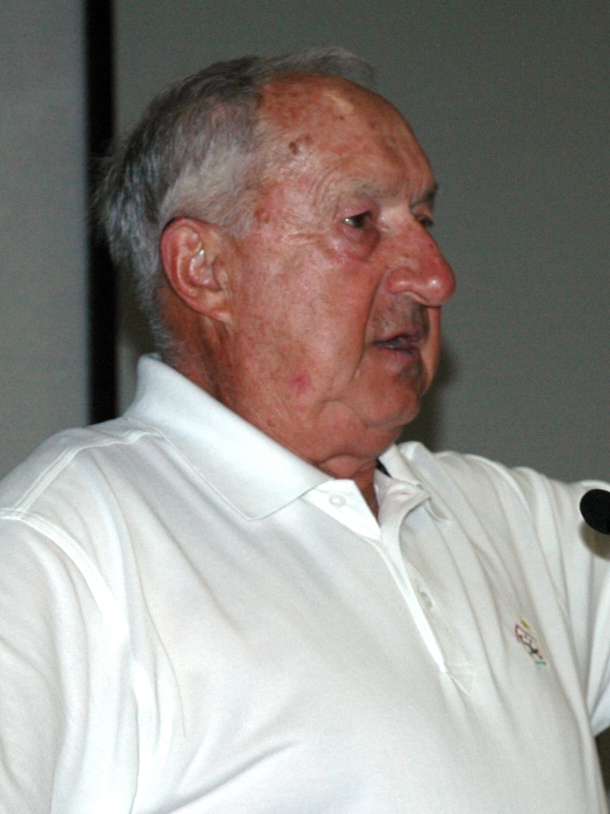
- Bratkowski in 2008

No. 12
- Position: Quarterback

Personal information
- Born: October 20, 1931; Danville, Illinois, U.S.
- Died: November 11, 2019 (aged 88); Santa Rosa Beach, Florida, U.S.
- Listed height: 6 ft 2 in (1.88 m)
- Listed weight: 210 lb (95 kg)

Career information
- High school: Schlarman Academy (Danville)
- College: Georgia (1951–1953)
- NFL draft: 1953: 2nd round, 17th overall pick

Career history

Playing
- Chicago Bears (1954, 1957–1960); Los Angeles Rams (1961–1963); Green Bay Packers (1963–1968); Minnesota Vikings (1969)*; Green Bay Packers (1971); Chicago Bears (1973)
- * Offseason or practice squad member only

Coaching
- Green Bay Packers (1969–1970) Assistant/backs; Chicago Bears (1972–1974) Quarterbacks/receivers; Green Bay Packers (1975–1979) Quarterbacks; Green Bay Packers (1980–1981) Backs; Baltimore Colts (1982–1983) Offensive coordinator/quarterbacks; Indianapolis Colts (1984) Offensive coordinator/quarterbacks; New York Jets (1985–1989) Quarterbacks; Cleveland Browns (1990) Quarterbacks; Philadelphia Eagles (1991–1994) Offensive coordinator/quarterbacks; New York Jets (1995) Offensive coordinator/quarterbacks; New York Jets (1996) Assistant head coach

Awards and highlights
- 2× Super Bowl champion (I, II); 3× NFL champion (1965–1967); Green Bay Packers Hall of Fame; Third-team All-American (1953); NCAA passing yards leader (1952); First-team All-SEC (1953); 2× Second-team All-SEC (1951, 1952)

Career NFL statistics
- Passing attempts: 1,484
- Passing completions: 762
- Completion percentage: 51.3%
- TD–INT: 65–122
- Passing yards: 10,345
- Passer rating: 54.3
- Stats at Pro Football Reference
- Coaching profile at Pro Football Reference

Edmund Raymond "Zeke" Bratkowski (October 20, 1931 − November 11, 2019) was an American professional football player who was a quarterback in the National Football League (NFL) for 14 seasons with the Chicago Bears, Los Angeles Rams, and Green Bay Packers.

Bratkowski was an All-American playing college football with the Georgia Bulldogs, and later was an assistant coach in the NFL for over two decades. He was the father of former Jacksonville Jaguars offensive coordinator Bob Bratkowski.

== Early life ==
Born and raised in Westville, Illinois, Bratkowski played high school football at Schlarman Academy in Danville and graduated in 1949. The nickname by which he commonly went had its origins in his boyhood years, when he frequently wore a baseball jersey emblazoned with the name of Major Leaguer Zeke Bonura across the front.

Bratkowski came to national prominence in his sophomore season at the University of Georgia in Athens in 1951, and was twice the SEC passing leader under head coach Wally Butts. During his three-year career with the Bulldogs, he completed 360 passes for 4,863 yards.

Bratkowski was considered one of college football's greatest quarterbacks of his day and was the NCAA's all-time leading passer until 1961. Today, he still ranks eighth on Georgia's list of career passing leaders. Bratkowski also led the NCAA in punting his senior year in 1953 with a 42.6 yard average. He was selected for the North–South All-Star Game in Miami, Florida, in December, and led the South to a 20–0 victory.

== Playing career ==
=== Chicago Bears ===
Bratkowski was selected 17th overall in the second round of the 1953 NFL draft by the Chicago Bears as a "future choice" after his redshirt junior season, then played his fifth-year senior season at Georgia in 1953. He joined the Bears as a rookie in 1954. He started the first game of the season with a 64-yard touchdown pass, but was benched after completing just one of his next 11 passes with four interceptions. After George Blanda was lost for the season with a separated shoulder in mid-November, Bratkowski entered the game and threw three more interceptions in the loss. However, he started and won the last four games of the season, despite ten interceptions in those games for a franchise rookie record 17 on the season.

Bratkowski then served in the U.S. Air Force for two years, missing the 1955 and 1956 seasons. He returned in 1957 and shared time at quarterback with Ed Brown, and played five seasons in Chicago, through 1960. His seven interceptions in an October 2, 1960, loss to Baltimore remains a franchise record.

=== Los Angeles Rams ===
Bratkowski was traded to the Los Angeles Rams in March 1961, and played in Los Angeles for 2 1/2 seasons before being signed in October 1963 by Vince Lombardi for the $100 waiver fee to become the "super sub" to Bart Starr.

=== Green Bay Packers ===
In Green Bay, Bratkowski was nicknamed "Uncle Zekie", and became an ideal backup and spot starter during the Lombardi championship era. In a 15-year NFL career, he passed for 10,345 yards and 65 touchdowns.

In the Western Conference playoff game versus the Baltimore Colts in 1965, Bratkowski relieved the injured Starr early in the game and led the Packers to a 13–10 overtime victory on December 26 at Lambeau Field. The Packers went on to win the NFL championship game against the Cleveland Browns on January 2, 1966. This was the first of three consecutive NFL titles for the Packers, unprecedented in the playoff era (since 1933).

After coaching under Phil Bengtson in 1969 and 1970, Bratkowski came out of retirement to play again for the Packers in 1971 under first-year head coach Dan Devine, and appeared in six games, with one start.

=== Chicago Bears (second stint) ===
The following year, Bratkowski became an assistant coach for the Chicago Bears, a position he would hold for three seasons (1972–74); in 1973, the Bears activated Zeke as an emergency back-up quarterback for eight games, but he did not actually appear in any of them.

A well-conditioned athlete, Bratkowski was an early advocate of aerobic training for professional football players.

Bratkowski ended his career with an official NFL playoff record of 5–0, the best playoff record by a quarterback (minimum 5 playoff games played) in NFL history. However, due to 5 playoff games being a relatively small number, as well as his limited playing time in these games, he is seldom recognized or mentioned in conservations regarding the best playoff quarterback of all time.

== Coaching career ==
After his playing career, Bratkowski became quarterback coach/offensive coordinator for Chicago, Baltimore / Indianapolis, Philadelphia, and New York Jets. He was also a quarterbacks coach with Cleveland and the Jets and worked two stints as a Green Bay assistant coach.

While Bratkowski was coaching the Chicago Bears quarterbacks during the 1973 season, head coach Abe Gibron abruptly promoted him to offensive coordinator, then pressed him into service as a back-up quarterback (see above).

== Death ==
Bratkowski died at his home in Santa Rosa Beach, Florida, on November 11, 2019, of a heart attack at the age of 88.

== Halls of Fame ==
Bratkowski is a member of numerous halls of fame. In 1980, he was inducted into the State of Georgia Sports Hall of Fame. Nine years later (in 1989), Bratkowski was inducted into the Green Bay Packers Hall of Fame. He also was elected to the National Polish-American Sports Hall of Fame in 1995. Bratkowski was inducted into the University of Georgia's Circle of Honor in 2006, and was the first member of his high school's Hall of Fame in 1974.

== See also ==
- List of college football yearly passing leaders
