= Crawford Mims =

American football player (1933–2001)

Profile
- Position: Guard

Personal information
- Born: March 21, 1933; Carrollton, Mississippi, U.S.
- Died: April 21, 2001 (aged 68); Vicksburg, Mississippi, U.S.
- Listed height: 5 ft 10 in (1.78 m)
- Listed weight: 195 lb (88 kg)

Career information
- College: Ole Miss
- NFL draft: 1954: 18th round, 209th overall pick

Awards and highlights
- Consensus All-American (1953); Jacobs Blocking Trophy (1953); First-team All-SEC (1953); Second-team All-SEC (1952); Ole Miss Sports Hall of Fame (1988); Mississippi Sports Hall of Fame (1995)

Crawford Mims (March 21, 1933 – April 21, 2001) was an American former college football player who earned All-American honours as a guard for the Ole Miss Rebels football team at the University of Mississippi.

Mims attended the University of Mississippi in Oxford, Mississippi, starting in 1950, where he played for coach Johnny Vaught's Ole Miss Rebels football team from 1951 to 1953. During his three seasons with the Rebels, the team achieved an overall win-loss-tie record of 21–6–4. As a junior lineman for the 8–0–2 Rebels in 1952, he played in the Sugar Bowl on January 1, 1953. The 1952 rebels finished No. 7 in both the final AP Poll and Coaches Poll.

Mims was a first-team All-Southeastern Conference (SEC) selection in 1952 and 1953 and earned the SEC's Jacobs Blocking Trophy in 1953. He was recognized as a consensus first-team All-American following his 1953 senior season, when he was a first-team selection by the American Football Coaches Association (AFCA), the Associated Press (AP), the Football Writers Association of America (FWAA), Newspaper Enterprise Association (NEA), The Sporting News, United Press International (UPI), the Walter Camp Football Foundation, and Look magazine.

Mims was inducted into the Ole Miss Sports Hall of Fame in 1988 and the Mississippi Sports Hall of Fame in 1995.

== See also ==
- List of Southeastern Conference football individual awards
- List of University of Mississippi alumni
- Ole Miss Rebels
