= Ed Culpepper =

American football player (1934–2021)

No. 73, 71, 78
- Position: Defensive tackle

Personal information
- Born: January 21, 1934; Bradenton, Florida, U.S.
- Died: January 9, 2021 (aged 86); Bartlett, Tennessee, U.S.
- Listed height: 6 ft 1 in (1.85 m)
- Listed weight: 255 lb (116 kg)

Career information
- High school: Manatee (FL)
- College: Alabama
- NFL draft: 1955: 9th round, 101st overall pick

Career history
- Chicago/St. Louis Cardinals (1958–1960); Minnesota Vikings (1961); Pittsburgh Steelers (1962)*; Houston Oilers (1962-1963)
- * Offseason or practice squad member only

Awards and highlights
- 2× Second-team All-SEC (1952, 1953)

Career NFL/AFL statistics
- Fumble recoveries: 6
- Sacks: 8.5
- Stats at Pro Football Reference

Ed Culpepper (born Robert Edward Culpepper; January 21, 1934 – January 9, 2021) was a defensive tackle in the National Football League (NFL). He played two seasons with the Chicago Cardinals before moving with the team to St. Louis, Missouri before the 1960 NFL season. Culpepper was later selected in the 1961 NFL expansion draft by the Minnesota Vikings and would play for the team during the 1961 NFL season. He would play his final two professional seasons with the Houston Oilers of the American Football League.
