= George Morris (American football, born 1931) =

American football player (1931–2007)

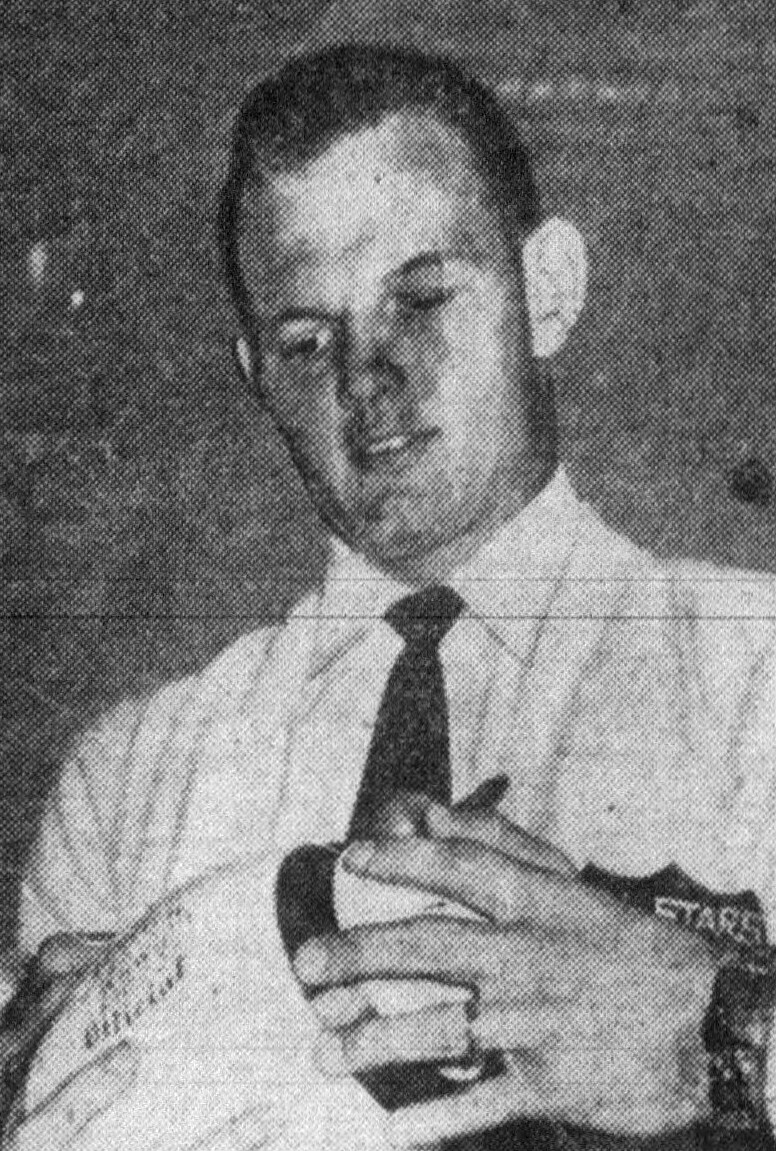
- Morris, circa 1953

No. 52
- Positions: Center, linebacker

Personal information
- Born: March 19, 1931; Vicksburg, Mississippi, U.S.
- Died: December 10, 2007 (aged 76); Highlands, North Carolina, U.S.
- Listed height: 6 ft 2 in (1.88 m)
- Listed weight: 220 lb (100 kg)

Career information
- High school: Carr Central (Vicksburg)
- College: Georgia Tech
- NFL draft: 1953: 2nd round, 21st overall pick

Career history
- San Francisco 49ers (1956)

Awards and highlights
- National champion (1952); Second-team All-American (1952); First-team All-SEC (1952)

Career NFL statistics
- Games played: 12
- Games started: 4
- Fumble recoveries: 1
- Stats at Pro Football Reference
- College Football Hall of Fame

George Augustus Morris Jr. (March 19, 1931 – December 10, 2007) was an American professional football player. Born in Vicksburg, Mississippi, he played college football for the Georgia Tech Yellow Jackets and professionally for the San Francisco 49ers for one season in 1956.

Morris was an academic All-American and a member of the 1952 Georgia Tech National Championship team.

His pro career was delayed by service in the US Army during Korea.

After leaving football he worked for the Georgia Power Company, the Royal Crown Cola Company and Georgia Morris and Associates. He worked with the Southeastern Conference for thirty years and was actively involved in the Chic-Fil-A Bowl and Scholar Athlete Selection Committee and the Bobby Dodd Coach of the Year Foundation.

He was elected to the College Football Hall of Fame in 1981. He was also inducted into the National Football Foundation and Hall of Fame, the Mississippi Football Hall of Fame, the George Football Hall of Fame and the Georgia Tech Hall of Fame. He represented Georgia Tech as one of the ACC Championship Football Legends for 2007.

He died of an apparent heart attack at age 76 in Highlands, North Carolina.
