= Lum Snyder =

American football player (1930–1985)

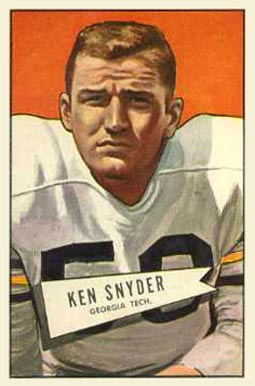
- Snyder on a 1952 Bowman football card

No. 73, 79
- Position: Offensive tackle

Personal information
- Born: August 12, 1930; Cleveland, Tennessee, U.S.
- Died: October 11, 1985 (aged 55); Winter Haven, Florida, U.S.
- Listed height: 6 ft 5 in (1.96 m)
- Listed weight: 228 lb (103 kg)

Career information
- High school: Bradley (Cleveland)
- College: Georgia Tech (1948–1951)
- NFL draft: 1952: 3rd round, 29th overall pick

Career history

Playing
- Philadelphia Eagles (1952–1955, 1958)

Coaching
- BC Lions (1959) Line coach

Awards and highlights
- Second-team All-Pro (1953); 2× Pro Bowl (1953, 1954); First-team All-SEC (1951)

Career NFL statistics
- Games played: 59
- Games started: 58
- Fumble recoveries: 1
- Stats at Pro Football Reference

Kenneth David "Lum" Snyder (August 12, 1930 – October 1985) was an American professional football player who was an offensive lineman for the Philadelphia Eagles of the National Football League (NFL) from 1952 through 1955 and in 1958. He was named to the Pro Bowl two times. Snyder played college football for the Georgia Tech Yellow Jackets.
