= Pete Brown (American football) =

American football player (1930–2001)

No. 56, 47
- Positions: Center, linebacker

Personal information
- Born: December 19, 1930; Rossville, Georgia, U.S.
- Died: September 4, 2001 (aged 70); Atlanta, Georgia, U.S.
- Listed height: 6 ft 2 in (1.88 m)
- Listed weight: 210 lb (95 kg)

Career information
- College: Georgia Tech
- NFL draft: 1953: 10th round, 119th overall pick

Career history
- San Francisco 49ers (1953–1954); BC Lions (1958)

Awards and highlights
- First-team All-SEC (1952)

Career NFL statistics
- Punts: 49
- Punting yards: 1,837
- Longest punt: 51
- Stats at Pro Football Reference

Samuel Morris Brown also known as Pete Brown (December 19, 1930 – September 4, 2001) was an American professional football linebacker and center who played for the San Francisco 49ers. He played college football for the Georgia Tech football team.

== Early life ==
A native of Rossville, Georgia, Brown graduated from Rossville High School in Rossville, Georgia.

== Career ==
=== College football ===
Brown was a member of two teams, that went undefeated while he was at Georgia Tech - 1951 team that finished 11–0–1 - 1952 team that finished 12-0 sharing the national championship with Michigan State.

"He was the greatest blocker I ever saw," said Edwin Pope, former Atlanta Constitution sports writer and sports editor of the Miami Herald.

=== NFL ===
Drafted in the tenth round by the 49ers in 1953, Brown's NFL career was cut short due to a shoulder injury.

=== Military service ===
Brown served as a lieutenant colonel in the Air Force Reserve Command.

== Awards and recognition ==
All Southeastern Conference (SEC) in 1951 NCAA All-American, Football in 1952 NCAA National Championship Team Member in 1952 Georgia Tech Athletic Hall of Fame inductee in 1974 Georgia Sports Hall of Fame inductee in 1990.
