= Bob Davis (American football, born 1930) =

American football and wrestling coach (1930–2011)

Biographical details
- Born: January 15, 1930; Bluefield, West Virginia, U.S.
- Died: October 2, 2011 (aged 81); Knoxville, Tennessee, U.S.
- Education: Tennessee (1973)

Playing career
- 1949–1951: Tennessee
- Position: Center

Coaching career (HC unless noted)

Football
- 1953–1954: Fort Jackson
- 1955: Sevier County HS (TN) (assistant)
- 1956–1958: Sevier County HS (TN)
- 1959–1963: Carson–Newman (assistant)
- 1964–1965: Carson–Newman
- 1966–1975: Tennessee (freshmen/DE/JV)

Wrestling
- 1970–1974: Tennessee

Administrative career (AD unless noted)
- 1976–2003: Tennessee (assistant/associate AD)

Head coaching record
- Overall: 11–7 (college football)

Accomplishments and honors

Championships
- National (1951)

Robert Lee Davis (January 15, 1930 – October 2, 2011) was an American football and wrestling coach. He was the starting center for the 1951 Tennessee Volunteers college football national championship team. He served as the head football coach at Carson–Newman University in Jefferson City, Tennessee from 1964 to 1965 and the head wrestling coach at the University of Tennessee in Knoxville, Tennessee from 1970 to 1974.
