= Memphis Technical High School =

Location
- 1266 Poplar Avenue; Memphis, Tennessee; United States
- Coordinates: 35.1449°N 90.0183°W

Information
- Motto: To the stars through striving
- Founded: 1911
- Status: closed
- Closed: 1987
- Colors: Blue and Gold
- Mascot: Yellowjacket

Memphis Technical High School, originally Memphis Vocational School, was a high school that served downtown Memphis, Tennessee from 1911 to 1987. The school building that exists today was constructed in 1927, and is operated by the Shelby County School System as the Memphis Academy of Science and Engineering (MASE).

== History ==
The Memphis School Board of Education authorized the new Memphis Vocational High School in July 1911, and opened it September 1911, in the recently vacated Memphis High School building at 317 Poplar. The school was opened at the same time as the new Central High School, with the intention "to take the load off the new Central High, so that additional schools would not have to be built for some time".

Memphis Vocational High School was the first vocational high school in the US, opening with 72 students in grades 7 to 10, before classes began to grow. In 1917, J. L. Highsaw, a classroom teacher at the school, became principal. In 1918 the school name was changed to Crockett Vocational High School, with four teachers and 232 students. In 1921 the name was changed again to Crockett Technical High School.

Soon a new building was required, and it was decided that the nearby palatial Van Vleet mansion on Poplar Avenue would be demolished in favour of a modern school building. The school board paid $90,000 for the 10-acre (40,000 m^{2}) property on which the home was located, and spent $500,000 to build the new school, built by the architectural firm of Hanker, Cairns, and Wallace. Until the new building opened, overflow classes were taught in the Jefferson Annex, the old Fowlkes School on Jefferson.

In 1928 the new building at 1266 Poplar was completed and the school changed its name for a final time to Memphis Technical High School. At the main entrance were four Corinthian columns, supporting a portico on the front. Some elements from the previous Van Vleet mansion were retained, including two stone lions at the east gate (since moved to the entrance of Memphis Zoo and then to a central location within the zoo), a stone bench from the mansion's green house, and two large classic urns at the top of the entrance steps. The four columns and portico of the school's entrance themselves reflect the entrance to the Van Vleet mansion.

In 1936, Tech had 47 teachers and over 1400 students. Highsaw retired in 1957 and W. A. Bourne became principal, until 1975. The school continued to grow until the "decline of the cities" in the 1970s. With the changing demographics of the inner-city, it finally closed in 1987.

== Notable alumni ==
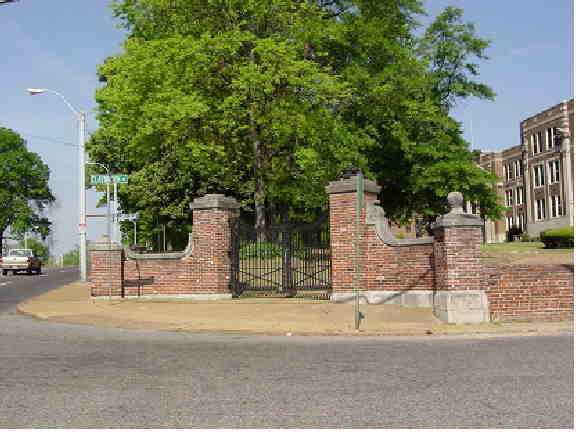
Tech High School's front gate

- Gene Bearden - Major League Pitcher
- Rex Boggan - 1948. National Football League player
- Bobby Bragan - 1936. Major League Baseball player
- Ace Cannon - 1952. Musician. "Godfather of Sax"
- Burton Callicott - 1926. Artist - Teacher. Painted murals at the Pink Palace
- Aubrey Epps - 1933 - Major League Baseball player
- Charlie Musselwhite - 1962. Musician "Chicago Harp style"
- Don Nix - Songwriter, Record Producer, Creator of the "Memphis Sound"
- Curtis Person - 1933. Golfer
- Kay Starr - 1940. Singer
- Stella Stevens - Film and television actress
- Travis Wammack - Musician - "fastest guitar player in the South"
- William Walton - Co-founder of Holiday Inns
