= Leon Hardeman =

American football player (1932–2019)

- Hardeman on cover of 1953 Official Collegiate Football Record Book

No. 11 – Georgia Tech Yellow Jackets
- Position: Halfback
- Class: 1954

Personal information
- Born: June 6, 1932; Fort Payne, Alabama, U.S.
- Died: December 9, 2019 (aged 87); Rossville, Georgia, U.S.
- Listed height: 5 ft 6 in (1.68 m)
- Listed weight: 175 lb (79 kg)

Career information
- College: Georgia Tech (1951–1953)

Awards and highlights
- First-team All-American (1952); Third-team All-American (1953); First-team All-SEC (1952); 2× Second-team All-SEC (1951, 1953)

Leon Hardeman (June 6, 1932 – December 9, 2019) was an American football player. Hardeman played college football at the halfback position for the Georgia Tech Yellow Jackets football team from 1951 to 1953. At five feet, six inches and 175 pounds, Hardeman was known for his "squat, wiry" running style.

== Career ==
Hardeman was selected by the All-America Board, the International News Service and the Sporting News as a first-team player on their respective 1952 College Football All-America Teams. He was chosen by the United Press as a third-team player in 1953.

Hardeman was inducted into the Hall of Fame in the City of Chattanooga, Baylor School, Georgia Tech and the state of Georgia.

The number 50 jersey was retired at LaFayette High School in his honor.
