= Lee Hayley =

American football player, coach, and college athletics administrator

Biographical details
- Born: c. 1930; Ensley, Alabama, U.S.
- Died: September 20, 1997 (age 67)

Playing career
- 1950–1952: Auburn
- Position: End

Coaching career (HC unless noted)
- 1956–1962: McNeese State (assistant)
- 1963–1966: Auburn (assistant)
- 1967–1971: North Carolina (DC)

Administrative career (AD unless noted)
- 1972–1981: Auburn
- 1981–1994: Georgia (sr. assoc. AD)

Lee Hayley (c. 1930 – September 20, 1997) was an American football player, coach, and college athletics administrator.

A native of Ensley, Alabama, Hayley enrolled at Auburn University where he played college football from 1950 to 1952. He was captain of the 1952 Auburn Tigers football team under head coach Ralph Jordan.

Hayley served in the military after graduating from Auburn. He then began his coaching career as a graduate assistant at Auburn in 1955. From 1956 to 1962, he served as an assistant football coach at McNeese State and, from 1963 to 1966, an assistant coach at Auburn. From 1967 to 1971, he was the defensive coordinator at the University of North Carolina. From 1972 to 1981, he was the athletic director at Auburn. From 1981 to 1994, he served as senior associate athletic director at the University of Georgia.
