= Larry Morris =

American football player (1933–2012)

No. 56, 31, 33, 55
- Positions: Linebacker, fullback, halfback

Personal information
- Born: December 10, 1933; Atlanta, Georgia, U.S.
- Died: December 19, 2012 (aged 79); Austell, Georgia, U.S.
- Listed height: 6 ft 2 in (1.88 m)
- Listed weight: 226 lb (103 kg)

Career information
- High school: Decatur (Decatur, Georgia)
- College: Georgia Tech
- NFL draft: 1955: 1st round, 7th overall pick

Career history
- Los Angeles Rams (1955–1957); Chicago Bears (1959–1965); Atlanta Falcons (1966)

Awards and highlights
- NFL champion (1963); Second-team All-Pro (1963); NFL 1960s All-Decade Team; 100 greatest Bears of All-Time; National champion (1952); Consensus All-American (1953); Second-team All-American (1954); 2× First-team All-SEC (1953, 1954)

Career NFL statistics
- Interceptions: 6
- Fumble recoveries: 9
- Sacks: 21.5
- Stats at Pro Football Reference
- College Football Hall of Fame

Larry Cleo Morris (December 10, 1933 – December 19, 2012) was an American professional football player who was a linebacker in the National Football League (NFL), primarily with the Chicago Bears. The 1950 graduate of Decatur High School became an All-American playing college football for the Georgia Tech Yellow Jackets before his NFL career. "The Brahma Bull" was named one of the linebackers on the NFL 1960s All-Decade Team.

== College career ==
Morris was a four-year starter and a two-way player at center and linebacker positions for the Georgia Tech Yellow Jackets. Morris was also selected as three times first-team All-SEC and a team captain as a senior. He played during coach Bobby Dodd's most successful seasons at Georgia Tech. The Yellow Jackets had a 40-5-2 record over Morris’ four seasons, won two SEC titles, four bowl games and a share of the 1952 national championship with a 12–0 record. In his final game as a Yellow Jacket against rival Georgia in Athens on November 27, 1954, he played the entire game and was credited with 24 tackles as his team won 7–3. He was later named to the All-SEC 25-year team spanning 1950–1974 and in 1992 was inducted into the College Football Hall of Fame, one of 12 Tech players there.

== Professional career ==
Morris was the seventh overall pick in the first round of the 1955 NFL draft. He was named one of the linebackers on the NFL 1960s All-Decade Team. Morris played 12 seasons total with the Los Angeles Rams, Chicago Bears, and Atlanta Falcons. He was the MVP of the 1963 NFL Championship Game for the Bears. In addition, he was a member of the Atlanta Falcons' first-team in 1966.

== Savings & Loan crisis conviction ==
Morris was indicted and received probation during the Savings and loan crisis. As a licensed Atlanta real estate agent, two top corporate executives of First Mutual Savings in Pensacola, Florida, took illegal kickbacks causing his condos and rehabs loans to go bad.

== Health concerns ==
Morris was featured in an article in The Sporting News about former football players who had head injuries that happened during their career. According to the article, Morris had little, if any, recollection of his playing days.

== Death ==
Larry Cleo Morris died on December 19, 2012. A native Atlantan, he spent his last few years, since 2009, under nursing home care, at Presbyterian Village, in the city of Austell, Georgia. His brain was donated by his family to Boston University for the study of brain injuries associated with former professional football players.

An autopsy confirmed that Morris had the neural degenerative disease chronic traumatic encephalopathy (CTE), which is caused by repeated hits to the head. He is one of at least 345 NFL players to be diagnosed after death with chronic traumatic encephalopathy (CTE), which is caused by repeated hits to the head.

== See also ==
- 1952 college football season
- Mike Ditka
- List of NFL players with chronic traumatic encephalopathy
