= 1954 Cleveland Browns season =

NFL team season

- Head coach: Paul Brown
- Home stadium: Cleveland Stadium

Results
- Record: 9–3
- Division place: 1st Eastern
- Playoffs: Won NFL Championship (vs. Lions) 56–10
- All-Pros: 4: DE Len Ford (1st team); QB Otto Graham (1st team); T Lou Groza (1st team); G Abe Gibron (2nd team)
- Pro Bowlers: Otto Graham, QB; Len Ford, DE; Lou Groza, LT; Abe Gibron, G Don Colo, DT; Dante Lavelli, E

The 1954 Cleveland Browns season was the team's fifth season with the National Football League. The Browns' defense became the first defense in the history of the NFL to lead the league in fewest rushing yards allowed, fewest passing yards allowed, and fewest total yards allowed.

The Browns were 9–3 in the regular season and won the Eastern Conference. They hosted the NFL Championship Game, and met the two-time defending champion Detroit Lions for the third straight year. This year's result was different, as the Browns won with a 56–10 blowout.

The teams had met on the same field the previous week, in a meaningless game won 14–10 by the Lions. Both teams had already clinched their respective conference titles; it was postponed from early October due to the World Series. After the win, Detroit was a slight favorite for the title game.

== Offseason ==
Defensive Back Don Paul arrived via a trade with the Washington Redskins, who acquired him from the Chicago Cardinals. Upon his arrival in Washington, he fell in disfavor with George Preston Marshall of the Redskins.

In January 1954, assistant coach Weeb Ewbank departed to become head coach of the Baltimore Colts.

=== NFL draft ===
The 1954 NFL draft was one of the biggest busts in the team's history. With the first overall pick in the draft, the Browns selected quarterback Bobby Garrett out of Stanford University. The plan was that he would be the heir to Otto Graham. Garrett suffered from a stuttering problem which hindered his performance in the huddle. Eventually, Garrett was traded to the Green Bay Packers in exchange for Babe Parilli, although Parilli would not play for the Browns until 1956. Later in the first round, the club selected John Bauer, who never played for the Browns and only played in two NFL games in his career.

== Roster ==
1954 Cleveland Browns roster
Quarterbacks 14 Otto Graham; 16 George Ratterman Running backs 38 Maurice Bassett; 44 Chet Hanulak; 40 Dub Jones; 32 Fred Morrison; 26 Ray Renfro; 46 Billy Reynolds Receivers 88 Pete Brewster; 84 Horace Gillom (P, DE); 86 Dante Lavelli	Offensive linemen 60 Harold Bradley G 62 Herschel Forester G 52 Frank Gatski C 64 Abe Gibron G (C); 76 Lou Groza T (K); 65 Chuck Noll G 78 John Sandusky T Defensive linemen 83 Doug Atkins DE; 70 Don Colo DT; 80 Len Ford DE; 79 Bob Gain DT (T); 72 John Kissell DT; 82 Carlton Massey DE; 74 Mike McCormack MG	Linebackers 54 Tony Adamle; 50 Tom Catlin (C); 34 Walt Michaels Defensive backs 15 Ken Gorgal S 42 Tommy James S 22 Ken Konz S 24 Warren Lahr CB (RB); 20 Don Paul CB	Reserve lists -- Gene Filipski RB (Military); 79 Don King DT (IR) -- Babe Parilli QB (Military) --Joe Skibinski G (Military) rookies in italics

== Exhibition schedule ==
Week	Date	Opponent	Result	Attendance
1	August 21	at Green Bay Packers	W 14–13	15,747
2	August 27	at Los Angeles Rams	L 38–10	58,567
3	September 5	at San Francisco 49ers	L 21–38	46,877
4	September 10	vs. Detroit Lions at Dallas	L 31–56	42,000
5	September 18	Chicago Bears	L 7–35	17,631

== Regular season ==
=== Schedule ===
Game	Date	Opponent	Result	Record	Venue	Attendance	Recap	Sources
1	September 26	at **Philadelphia Eagles**	**L** 10–28	0–1	Connie Mack Stadium	26,546	Recap	
—	October 3	Postponement to December 19; (World Series)						
2	October 10	**Chicago Cardinals**	**W** 31–7	1–1	Cleveland Municipal Stadium	24,101	Recap	
3	October 17	at **Pittsburgh Steelers**	**L** 27–55	1–2	Forbes Field	33,262	Recap	
4	October 24	at **Chicago Cardinals**	**W** 35–3	2–2	Comiskey Park	23,823	Recap	
5	October 31	**New York Giants**	**W** 24–14	3–2	Cleveland Municipal Stadium	30,448	Recap	
6	November 7	**Washington Redskins**	**W** 62–3	4–2	Cleveland Municipal Stadium	25,158	Recap	
7	November 14	at Chicago Bears	**W** 39–10	5–2	Wrigley Field	48,773	Recap	
8	November 21	**Philadelphia Eagles**	**W** 6–0	6–2	Cleveland Municipal Stadium	41,537	Recap	
9	November 28	at **New York Giants**	**W** 16–7	7–2	Polo Grounds	45,936	Recap	
10	December 5	at **Washington Redskins**	**W** 34–14	8–2	Griffith Stadium	21,761	Recap	
11	December 12	**Pittsburgh Steelers**	**W** 42–7	9–2	Cleveland Municipal Stadium	28,064	Recap	
12	December 19	Detroit Lions	**L** 10–14	9–3	Cleveland Municipal Stadium	34,168	Recap	
Note: Intra-conference opponents are in **bold** text.

=== Standings ===
Program for the October 10 game against the Chicago Cards.

NFL Eastern Conference
	W	L	T	PCT	CONF	PF	PA	STK
Cleveland Browns	9	3	0	.750	8–2	336	162	L1
Philadelphia Eagles	7	4	1	.636	7–3	284	230	W1
New York Giants	7	5	0	.583	7–3	293	184	L1
Pittsburgh Steelers	5	7	0	.417	4–6	219	263	L2
Washington Redskins	3	9	0	.250	2–8	207	432	W1
Chicago Cardinals	2	10	0	.167	2–8	183	347	L3

Note: Tie games were not officially counted in the standings until 1972.

== NFL Championship Game ==
Round	Date	Opponent	Result	Record	Venue	Attendance	Recap
Championship	December 26	Detroit Lions	W 56–10	1–0	Cleveland Municipal Stadium	43,827	Recap
