= 1954 New York Giants season =

NFL team season

- Owner: Tim Mara
- Head coach: Jim Lee Howell
- Home stadium: Polo Grounds

Results
- Record: 7–5
- Division place: 3rd NFL Eastern
- Playoffs: Did not qualify

The 1954 New York Giants season was the franchise's 30th season in the National Football League. The Giants saw an improvement of four games by finishing with a record of 7 wins and 5 losses.

== Preseason ==
Game	Date	Opponent	Result	Record	Venue	Attendance	Sources
1	August 8	vs. Los Angeles Rams	L 7–30	0–1	Multnomah Stadium	25,261	
2	August 15	at San Francisco 49ers	L 35–43	0–2	Kezar Stadium	29,296	
3	August 21	vs. Chicago Cardinals	W 26–0	1–2	Memorial Stadium	10,000	
4	September 4	vs. Detroit Lions	L 13–28	1–3	Oklahoma Memorial Stadium	25,000	
5	September 12	at Chicago Bears	L 24–28	1–4	Wrigley Field	22,334	
6	September 18	at Green Bay Packers	W 38–27	2–4	Marquette Stadium	17,000	

== Schedule ==
Game	Date	Opponent	Result	Record	Venue	Attendance	Recap	Sources
1	September 26	at **Chicago Cardinals**	**W** 41–10	1–0	Comiskey Park	16,780	Recap	
2	October 2	at Baltimore Colts	**L** 14–20	1–1	Memorial Stadium	27,088	Recap	
3	October 10	at **Washington Redskins**	**W** 51–21	2–1	Griffith Stadium	21,217	Recap	
4	October 17	**Chicago Cardinals**	**W** 31–17	3–1	Polo Grounds	31,256	Recap	
5	October 24	**Washington Redskins**	**W** 24–7	4–1	Polo Grounds	22,597	Recap	
6	October 31	at **Cleveland Browns**	**L** 14–24	4–2	Cleveland Municipal Stadium	30,448	Recap	
7	November 7	at **Pittsburgh Steelers**	**W** 30–6	5–2	Forbes Field	25,158	Recap	
8	November 14	**Philadelphia Eagles**	**W** 27–14	6–2	Polo Grounds	46,565	Recap	
9	November 21	Los Angeles Rams	**L** 16–17	6–3	Polo Grounds	27,077	Recap	
10	November 28	**Cleveland Browns**	**L** 7–16	6–4	Polo Grounds	45,936	Recap	
11	December 5	**Pittsburgh Steelers**	**W** 24–3	7–4	Polo Grounds	16,856	Recap	
12	December 12	at **Philadelphia Eagles**	**L** 14–29	7–5	Connie Mack Stadium	28,449	Recap	
Note: Intra-conference opponents are in **bold** text.

== Standings ==
NFL Eastern Conference
	W	L	T	PCT	CONF	PF	PA	STK
Cleveland Browns	9	3	0	.750	8–2	336	162	L1
Philadelphia Eagles	7	4	1	.636	7–3	284	230	W1
New York Giants	7	5	0	.583	7–3	293	184	L1
Pittsburgh Steelers	5	7	0	.417	4–6	219	263	L2
Washington Redskins	3	9	0	.250	2–8	207	432	W1
Chicago Cardinals	2	10	0	.167	2–8	183	347	L3

Note: Tie games were not officially counted in the standings until 1972.

== Roster ==
1954 New York Giants roster
Quarterbacks (QB): 12 Bob Clatterbuck; 11 Don Heinrich; Running backs (RB): 35 Bobby Epps; 20 Herb Johnson; 22 Buford Long CB; 31 Eddie Price; 44 Kyle Rote; Wide receivers (WR): 80 Ken MacAfee; 85 Bob Schnelker; 87 Bob Topp; Tight ends (TE)	Offensive linemen (OL): 62 John Bauer T; 79 Rosey Brown T; 65 Russ Carroccio G/T/MG; 67 George Kennard G; 53 John Rapacz C; 66 Jack Stroud G; 55 Ray Wietecha C/LB; 72 Dick Yelvington T; Defensive linemen (DL): 75 Bill Albright MG; 71 Ray Collins DT; 70 Ray Krouse DT; 89 Cliff Livingston DE; 78 Barney Poole DE; 74 Billy Shipp DT	Linebackers (LB): 52 John Cannady; 51 Pete Mangum; 30 Bill Svoboda; Defensive backs (DB): 24 Wayne Berry CB/RB; 49 Tom Landry CB/P; 25 Dick Nolan CB/S; 27 Herb Rich S; 45 Emlen Tunnell S; Special teams (ST): 9 Ben Agajanian K	Reserve: 60 Bill Austin G (IR); -- Ray Beck G (Military); 42 Charlie Conerly QB (IR); 86 Jim Duncan DE (IR); 16 Frank Gifford RB (IR); 34 Pat Knight DE/LB (IR); -- Leo Miles S/CB (Military); -- Hal Mitchell T (Military); 88 Dick Wilkins WR (IR); -- Frank Ziegler RB (DNR); Rookies in italics

== See also ==
- List of New York Giants seasons
