= 1954 Washington Redskins season =

NFL team season

- Owner: George Preston Marshall
- General manager: Dick McCann
- Head coach: Joe Kuharich
- Home stadium: Griffith Stadium

Results
- Record: 3–9
- Division place: 5th NFL Eastern
- Playoffs: Did not qualify

The 1954 Washington Redskins season was the franchise's 23rd season in the National Football League (NFL) and their 17th in Washington, D.C. The team failed to improve on their 6–5–1 record from 1953. The Redskins sent defensive back Don Paul to the Cleveland Browns. The Redskins acquired Paul from the Chicago Cardinals. Upon his arrival in Washington, he fell in displeasure with George Preston Marshall of the Redskins. Their 35.8% estimated defensive DVOA is the worst since 1950, according to FTN Fantasy. All three of their defensive Pro Bowlers from the season before were on other teams.

Although the NFL formally desegregated in 1946, many teams were slow to allow black athletes to compete even after the formal barrier had fallen. None were less willing to desegregate than the Washington Redskins, who sought to be the "home team" for a vast Southern market. The Redskins would remain the last bastion of racial segregation in the NFL, refusing to include a single black player on their roster until 1962.

== Preseason ==
Week	Date	Opponent	Result	Record	Venue	Attendance
1	August 6	at Eleventh Naval District	W 52–0	1–0	Balboa Stadium	10,000
2	August 18	at Los Angeles Rams	L 7–27	1–1	Los Angeles Memorial Coliseum	79,813
3	August 21	vs. San Francisco 49ers	L 7–30	1–2	Charles C. Hughes Stadium (Sacramento, CA)	23,389
4	August 27	at Detroit Lions	L 7–27	1–3	Briggs Stadium	34,380
5	September 4	vs. Chicago Bears	L 20–29	1–4	Carolina Stadium (Columbia, SC)	20,000
6	September 11	vs. Green Bay Packers	L 3–31	1–5	Riddick Stadium (Raleigh, NC)	16,000
7	September 18	at Baltimore Colts	L 14–49	1–6	Baltimore Memorial Stadium	19,380

== Regular season ==
=== Schedule ===
Week	Date	Opponent	Result	Record	Venue	Attendance	Recap
1	September 26	at San Francisco 49ers	**L** 7–41	0–1	Kezar Stadium	32,085	Recap
2	October 2	at **Pittsburgh Steelers**	**L** 7–37	0–2	Forbes Field	22,492	Recap
3	October 10	**New York Giants**	**L** 21–51	0–3	Griffith Stadium	21,217	Recap
4	October 17	**Philadelphia Eagles**	**L** 21–49	0–4	Griffith Stadium	22,051	Recap
5	October 24	at **New York Giants**	**L** 7–24	0–5	Polo Grounds	22,597	Recap
6	October 31	Baltimore Colts	**W** 24–21	1–5	Griffith Stadium	23,567	Recap
7	November 7	at **Cleveland Browns**	**L** 3–62	1–6	Cleveland Municipal Stadium	25,158	Recap
8	November 14	**Pittsburgh Steelers**	**W** 17–14	2–6	Griffith Stadium	19,388	Recap
9	November 21	at **Chicago Cardinals**	**L** 16–38	2–7	Comiskey Park	15,619	Recap
10	November 28	at **Philadelphia Eagles**	**L** 33–41	2–8	Connie Mack Stadium	18,517	Recap
11	December 5	**Cleveland Browns**	**L** 14–34	2–9	Griffith Stadium	21,761	Recap
12	December 12	**Chicago Cardinals**	**W** 37–20	3–9	Griffith Stadium	18,107	Recap
Note: Intra-conference opponents are in **bold** text.

== Standings ==
NFL Eastern Conference
	W	L	T	PCT	CONF	PF	PA	STK
Cleveland Browns	9	3	0	.750	8–2	336	162	L1
Philadelphia Eagles	7	4	1	.636	7–3	284	230	W1
New York Giants	7	5	0	.583	7–3	293	184	L1
Pittsburgh Steelers	5	7	0	.417	4–6	219	263	L2
Washington Redskins	3	9	0	.250	2–8	207	432	W1
Chicago Cardinals	2	10	0	.167	2–8	183	347	L3

Note: Tie games were not officially counted in the standings until 1972.

== Personnel ==
=== Roster ===
1954 Washington Redskins roster
Quarterbacks (QB): 16 Al Dorow; 18 Jack Scarbath; Running backs (RB): 39 Rob Goode; 22 Charlie Justice P; 41 Billy Wells; Wide receivers (WR): 87 Ed Barker; 82 Johnny Carson; 84 Hugh Taylor; Tight ends (TE)	Offensive linemen (OL): 60 Marv Berschet G/DE; 62 Don Boll T; 69 Ron Hansen G/T; 74 Bob Morgan T; 50 Harry Ulinski C; 63 Cas Witucki G; Defensive linemen (DL): 70 Dick Modzelewski DT; 88 Chet Ostrowski DE; 55 Jim Ricca DT/MG/T; 51 Jim Schrader MG/T/C; 85 Walt Yowarsky DE	Linebackers (LB): 44 Nick Adduci FB; 36 Chuck Drazenovich FB; 45 Ralph Felton RB; Defensive backs (DB): 42 Dick Alban CB; 12 Harry Gilmer S/CB/QB/RB; 43 Vic Janowicz CB/K/RB; 20 George Rosso S; 28 Joe Scudero S/RB; Special teams (ST)	Reserve: 46 Dale Atkeson RB (IR); -- Sam Baker RB/P (Military); -- Bill Cox S/WR (Military); -- Leon Heath RB (Military); -- Bill Hegarty T (IR); -- Harry Jagielski T (Military); -- Steve Meilinger DE (Military); 79 Volney Peters DT (IR); 89 Joe Tereshinski DE/LB (IR); -- Vic Thomas T (IR); Rookies in italics
