= 1954 Philadelphia Eagles season =

NFL team season

- Owner: Happy Hundred
- Head coach: Jim Trimble

Results
- Record: 7–4–1
- Division place: 2nd NFL Eastern
- Playoffs: Did not qualify

The 1954 Philadelphia Eagles season was their 22nd in the league. They matched their previous output of 7–4–1. The team failed to qualify for the playoffs for the fifth consecutive season. This was the first season to feature the Eagle wings logo on the helmets.

== Off Season ==
Philadelphia finished second in the last 2 seasons to the Cleveland Browns, with that Trimble is awarded a three-year contract after the team's second straight runner-up finish in 1953.

The Eagles hold training camp in Hershey, PA again. The 1954 season was the first in which the Eagles used the "wings" logo on their helmets.

=== NFL DRAFT ===
The 1954 NFL draft was held on January 28, 1954. The draft is again 30 rounds long, with 12 teams picking. A total of 360 players are taken in this 1 day draft. In 2011, a total of 254 players were taken by 32 teams over 3 nights.

The Eagles chose 28 players in this year's draft.

=== Player selections ===
The table shows the Eagle's selections and what picks they had that were traded away and the team that ended up with that pick. It is possible the Eagles' pick ended up with this team via another team that the Eagles made a trade with. Not shown are acquired picks that the Eagles traded away.

= Pro Bowler	= Hall of Famer

Rd	Pick	Player	Position	School
1	9	Neil Worden	Fullback	Notre Dame Fighting Irish
2	21	Rocky Ryan	End	Illinois Fighting Illini
3	33	Ted Connor	Tackle	University of Nebraska Cornhuskers
4	45	Menil "Minnie" Mavraides	Guard	Notre Dame
5	57	_{Pick Taken by Los Angeles Rams}		
6	69	Hal Lambert	Tackle	TCU Horned Frogs
7	81	Jerry Norton	Back	Southern Methodist
8	93	Dan Hunter	Tackle	Florida
9	105	Phil Branch	Guard	Texas
10	117	_{Pick Taken by Los Angeles Rams}		
11	129	Dave McLaughlin	End	Dartmouth Big Green
12	131	Dick Clasby	Back	Harvard Crimson
13	153	Joe Mehalick	Tackle	Virginia
14	165	Hal Patterson	Back	Kansas
15	177	Ray McKown	Back	Texas Christian
16	189	Charlie Grant	Center	Utah Utes
17	201	Bob Knowles	Tackle	Baylor Bears
18	213	Sam Mrvos	Guard	Georgia Bulldogs
19	225	Jerry Clem	Guard	Southern Methodist
20	237	Tommy Bailes	Back	Houston Cougars
21	249	Johnny Crouch	End	Texas Christian
22	261	Jim Wojciehowski	End	Purdue Boilermakers
23	273	Harold Lofton	Back	University of Mississippi Rebels
24	285	Nate Gressette	Tackle	Clemson Tigers
25	297	Ray Zambiasi	Back	Detroit
26	309	Charley Smith	Back	Baylor Bears
27	321	Ben Addiego	Back	Villanova Wildcats
28	333	John Gerdes	Tackle	Cornell Big Red
29	345	Jack Stone	Back	West Virginia
30	357	Tommy Woodlee	Back	South Carolina Gamecocks

== Schedule ==
Week	Date	Opponent	Result	Record	Attendance
1	September 26	Cleveland Browns	W 28–10	1–0	26,546
2	October 3	at Chicago Cardinals	W 35–16	2–0	17,084
3	October 9	Pittsburgh Steelers	W 24–22	3–0	37,322
4	October 17	at Washington Redskins	W 49–21	4–0	22,051
5	October 23	at Pittsburgh Steelers	L 7–17	4–1	39,075
6	October 30	Green Bay Packers	L 14–37	4–2	25,378
7	November 7	Chicago Cardinals	W 30–14	5–2	21,963
8	November 14	at New York Giants	L 14–27	5–3	46,565
9	November 21	at Cleveland Browns	L 0–6	5–4	41,537
10	November 28	Washington Redskins	W 41–33	6–4	18,517
11	December 5	at Detroit Lions	T 13–13	6–4–1	54,939
12	December 12	New York Giants	W 29–14	7–4–1	28,449

=== Standings ===
NFL Eastern Conference
	W	L	T	PCT	CONF	PF	PA	STK
Cleveland Browns	9	3	0	.750	8–2	336	162	L1
Philadelphia Eagles	7	4	1	.636	7–3	284	230	W1
New York Giants	7	5	0	.583	7–3	293	184	L1
Pittsburgh Steelers	5	7	0	.417	4–6	219	263	L2
Washington Redskins	3	9	0	.250	2–8	207	432	W1
Chicago Cardinals	2	10	0	.167	2–8	183	347	L3

Note: Tie games were not officially counted in the standings until 1972.

== Roster ==
(All time List of Philadelphia Eagles players in franchise history)

= 1954 Pro Bowl	= Hall of Famer

- + = Was a Starter in the Pro-Bowl

NO.	Player	AGE	POS	GP	GS	WT	HT	YRS	College
	Jim Trimble	35	COACH	_{1945 record} 7–4–1	_{NFL-Eagles; Lifetime} 21–14–2			3rd	Indiana University
33	Roy Barni	27	DB	10	0	185	5–11	2	San Francisco
60	Chuck Bednarik +	29	LB-C	12	0	233	6–3	5	Pennsylvania
10	Adrian Burk	27	QB	12	8	190	6–2	4	Baylor
77	Gus Cifelli	28	T	7	0	244	6–4	4	Notre Dame
44	Harry Dowda	32	DB-HB	12	0	195	6–2	5	Wake Forest
53	Ken Farragut	26	C-LB	8	0	240	6–4	3	Mississippi
27	Hal Giancanelli	25	HB	10	0	182	5–10	1	Loyola Marymount
22	Ralph Goldston	25	HB-DB	8	0	195	5–11	2	Youngstown State
71	Tom Higgins	24	T-G-DT	5	0	230	6–2	1	North Carolina
42	Bob Hudson	24	DB-LB-E	12	0	225	6–4	3	Clemson
63	Ken Huxhold	25	G	11	6	226	6–1	Rookie	Wisconsin
78	Mike Jarmoluk	32	DT-T-MG	12	0	232	6–5	8	Temple
40	Don Johnson	23	HB	6	0	187	6–0	1	California
76	Bucko Kilroy	33	G-MG-T-DT	12	0	243	6–2	11	Temple
25	Toy Ledbetter	27	HB	12	0	198	5–10	4	Oklahoma State
89	Don Luft	24	E	12	0	220	6–5	Rookie	Indiana
67	John Magee	31	G	12	0	220	5–10	6	_{La-Lafayette, and Rice}
64	Menil Mavraides	23	G	12	0	235	6–1	Rookie	Notre Dame
46	Don Miller	22	HB	2	0	195	6–2	Rookie	SMU
24	Dom Moselle	28	DB-HB	12	0	192	6–0	4	Wisconsin-Superior
41	Jerry Norton	23	DB-HB	12	0	195	5–11	Rookie	SMU
43	Jim Parmer	28	FB-HB	10	0	193	6–0	6	Oklahoma State
35	Pete Pihos +	31	E-DE	12	0	210	6–1	7	Indiana
72	Jess Richardson	24	DT	12	0	261	6–2	1	Alabama
52	Wayne Robinson	24	LB-C	12	0	225	6–2	2	Minnesota
23	Bill Roffler	24	DB	3	0	200	6–1	Rookie	Washington State
82	Tom Scott	24	DE-LB	12	0	218	6–2	1	Virginia
66	Ed Sharkey	27	LB-G-T-DG	12	0	229	6–3	7	_{Duke, and Nevada-Reno}
73	Lum Snyder	24	T	12	0	228	6–5	2	Georgia Tech
20	Don Stevens	26	HB	4	0	176	5–9	2	Illinois
11	Bobby Thomason	26	QB	10	4	196	6–1	5	VMI
83	Bobby Walston	26	E-HB-K	12	0	190	6–0	3	Georgia ... Uga's page
86	Norm Willey +	27	DE-G-E	12	0	224	6–2	4	Marshall
49	Jerry Williams	31	DB-HB	11	0	175	5–10	5	_{Idaho, and Washington State}
32	Neil Worden	23	FB	12	0	198	5–10	Rookie	Notre Dame
75	Frank Wydo	30	T-DT	12	12	225	6–4	7	Cornell
	Players; Team Average	26.5		12		211.4	6–1.2	3.2	
