= 1954 Detroit Lions season =

NFL team season (lost NFL Championship

- Head coach: Buddy Parker
- Home stadium: Briggs Stadium

Results
- Record: 9–2–1
- Division place: 1st NFL Western
- Playoffs: Lost NFL Championship (at Browns) 10–56

The 1954 Detroit Lions season marked the franchise's 25th year in the National Football League (NFL), including four initial seasons as the Portsmouth Spartans. The team failed to improve on their previous season's output of 10–2, winning only nine games. They qualified for the championship game for the third consecutive season.

== Offseason ==
=== NFL draft ===
The Lions drafted 32 players in the 1954 NFL draft. Their first-round pick was Dick Chapman, an All-American defensive tackle out of Rice. Chapman never played a snap for the Lions, electing to return to Rice and finish his degree in physics. Their second-round pick, Michigan State center Jim Neal, also never played a snap after "marrying a girl whose religion prohibited him to play football on Sundays."

== Preseason ==
Week	Date	Opponent	Result	Record	Venue	Attendance
1	August 13	vs. College All-Stars	W 34–6	1–0	Soldier Field	93,740
2	August 19	at Philadelphia Eagles	W 17–14	2–0	Connie Mack Stadium	45,600
3	August 27	Washington Redskins	W 27–7	3–0	Briggs Stadium	34,380
4	September 4	vs. New York Giants	W 28–13	4–0	Oklahoma Memorial Stadium	25,000
5	September 10	vs. Cleveland Browns	W 56–31	5–0	Cotton Bowl	43,000
6	September 19	vs. Pittsburgh Steelers	W 42–14	6–0	War Memorial Stadium	20,000

== Regular season ==
According to the team, a total of 28,553 season tickets were sold by the Lions for the 1954 campaign. The Lions played their home games in Briggs Stadium (Tiger Stadium), which had a regular listed seating capacity of 46,194, with an additional 7,000 bleacher seats for football to bring total capacity to 53,194.

=== Schedule ===
Week	Date	Opponent	Result	Record	Venue	Attendance	Recap	Sources
1	September 26	**Chicago Bears**	**W** 48–23	1–0	Briggs Stadium	52,343	Recap	
—	Postponement to December 19; (World Series)							
2	October 10	**Los Angeles Rams**	**W** 21–3	2–0	Briggs Stadium	56,523	Recap	
3	October 16	**Baltimore Colts**	**W** 35–0	3–0	Briggs Stadium	48,272	Recap	
4	October 24	at **San Francisco 49ers**	**L** 31–37	3–1	Kezar Stadium	60,500	Recap	
5	October 31	at **Los Angeles Rams**	**W** 27–24	4–1	Los Angeles Memorial Coliseum	74,342	Recap	
6	November 6	at **Baltimore Colts**	**W** 27–3	5–1	Memorial Stadium	25,287	Recap	
7	November 14	**San Francisco 49ers**	**W** 48–7	6–1	Briggs Stadium	58,431	Recap	
8	November 21	at **Green Bay Packers**	**W** 21–17	7–1	City Stadium	20,767	Recap	
9	November 25	**Green Bay Packers**	**W** 28–24	8–1	Briggs Stadium	55,532	Recap	
10	December 5	Philadelphia Eagles	**T** 13–13	8–1–1	Briggs Stadium	54,939	Recap	
11	December 12	at **Chicago Bears**	**L** 24–28	8–2–1	Wrigley Field	37,240	Recap	
12	December 19	at Cleveland Browns	**W** 14–10	9–2–1	Cleveland Municipal Stadium	34,168	Recap	
Note: Intra-conference opponents are in **bold** text. • Saturday night: October 16, November 6. Thanksgiving: November 25.

=== Standings ===
Program produced by the Chicago Bears for their December 12 match-up with the Lions.

NFL Western Conference
	W	L	T	PCT	CONF	PF	PA	STK
Detroit Lions	9	2	1	.818	8–2	337	189	W1
Chicago Bears	8	4	0	.667	7–3	301	279	W4
San Francisco 49ers	7	4	1	.636	5–4–1	313	251	W2
Los Angeles Rams	6	5	1	.545	4–5–1	314	285	W1
Green Bay Packers	4	8	0	.333	3–7	234	251	L4
Baltimore Colts	3	9	0	.250	2–8	131	279	L1

Note: Tie games were not officially counted in the standings until 1972.

== Postseason ==
Round	Date	Opponent	Result	Record	Venue	Attendance	Sources
NFL Championship	December 26	at Cleveland Browns	L 10–56	0–1	Cleveland Stadium	43,827	

== Roster ==
The Detroit Lions 1954 Football Highlights (1954) (34:19)
Highlight reel of the Lions' 1954 season

1954 Detroit Lions roster
Quarterbacks (QB): 19 Tom Dublinski; 22 Bobby Layne; Running backs (RB): 33 Bill Bowman; 34 Lew Carpenter; 14 Bob Hoernschemeyer; 36 Bob Smith; 37 Doak Walker K/S; Wide receivers (WR): 80 Cloyce Box; 87 Dorne Dibble; 83 Jim Doran DE; 23 Jug Girard P; 82 Leon Hart; Tight ends (TE)	Offensive linemen (OL): 50 Charlie Ane T/C; 76 Lou Creekmur T/G/MG; 62 Jim Martin G/K/LB; 73 Thurman McGraw DT; 52 Andy Miketa C; 66 Harley Sewell G; 63 Dick Stanfel G; Defensive linemen (DL): 65 Les Bingaman MG; 85 Sonny Gandee DE; 72 Gil Mains DT; 74 Bob Miller DT; 70 Gerry Perry DT; 84 Hal Turner DE; 88 Jim Cain DE; 78 Bob Dove DE	Linebackers (LB): 53 LaVern Torgeson C; 56 Joe Schmidt; Defensive backs (DB): 21 Carl Karilivacz S; 20 Bill Stits CB; 24 Jack Christiansen S; 25 Jim David CB; Special teams (ST)	Reserve: -- Stan Campbell G (Military); -- Gordon Cooper WR (IR); -- Pence Dacus QB (Military); -- Dom Fucci CB/P (IR); -- Gene Gedman RB (Military); 43 Dick Kercher RB/S (IR); -- Yale Lary S/P (Military); -- Ollie Spencer T (Military); Rookies in italics
