= 1954 San Francisco 49ers season =

American football team season

- Owner: Tony Morabito
- General manager: Louis Spadia
- Head coach: Buck Shaw
- Home stadium: Kezar Stadium

Results
- Record: 7–4–1
- Division place: 3rd NFL Western
- Playoffs: Did not qualify

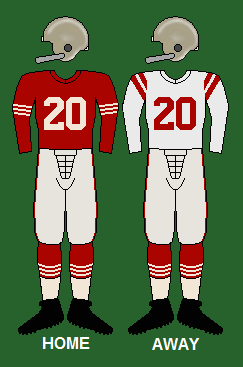
The uniform of the San Francisco 49ers, 1950-1954 with alternate silver helmet

The 1954 San Francisco 49ers season was the franchise's 5th season in the National Football League and their 9th overall. The team was coming off a 9–3 record in 1953, finishing one game behind the Detroit Lions for a spot in the championship game.

The 49ers got off to a strong start, beginning the season with a 4–0–1 record, as they were trying to finish on top of the conference for the first time in team history. The Niners lost their next 2 games against the Chicago Bears and Los Angeles Rams by close scores, but they still found themselves in the playoff race as no team was running away with the conference. The 4–2–1 Niners had a huge game against the 5–1–0 Detroit Lions, which was a must-win game for San Francisco. But the Lions had other ideas, demolishing the 49ers 48–7, leaving them with a 4–3–1 record. San Francisco finished the season with 3 wins in their final 4 games, ending up in 3rd place with a 7–4–1 record.

Offensively, Y. A. Tittle had another strong season, throwing for 2,205 yards and 9 touchdowns, while completing 57.6% of his passes. Billy Wilson led the club with 60 receptions and 830 yards and 5 touchdowns. San Francisco's ground attack was overwhelming. Joe Perry rushed for an NFL-high 1,049 yards, and John Johnson rushed for 681 yards (2nd highest total in the NFL) and a team-high 9 touchdowns. Hugh McElhenny led the team with 8.0 yards per carry until he separated his shoulder on October 31 against the Chicago Bears.

Joe Perry (FB), Bruno Banducci (G) and Leo Nomellini (DT) made the Associated Press All-Pro team. Hugh McElhenny (HB), Billy Wilson (E), and Bob St. Clair (T) made the second squad.

== Offseason ==
=== NFL draft ===
1954 San Francisco 49ers draft
Round	Pick	Player	Position	College	Notes
1	11	Bernie Faloney	Back	Maryland	signed with Edmonton Eskimos (WIFU)
2	23	Leo Rucka	Linebacker	Rice	played with 49ers in 1956.
3	35	Steve Korcheck	Center	George Washington	decided to play professional baseball.
4	47	Charlie Boxold	Back	Kansas	
5	55	Bob Hantla	Guard	Maryland	
5	59	Frank Mincevich	Guard	South Carolina	
6	71	Floyd Sagely	Defensive back	Arkansas	
7	83	Sid Youngelman	Defensive tackle	Alabama	played with 49ers in 1955.
9	107	Ted Connolly *	Guard	Tulsa	
11	131	John Skocko	End	USC	
12	143	Hal Easterwood	Center	Mississippi State	returned to play at MSU.
13	155	Morgan Williams	Guard	TCU	
14	167	Sammy Williams	Back	California	
15	171	Ed Gossage	Tackle	Georgia Tech	
15	179	Sam Palumbo	Guard	Notre Dame	returned to Notre Dame
16	191	Bobby Fiveash	Back	Florida State	
17	203	Carl Kautz	Tackle	Texas Tech	
18	215	Morris Kay	End	Kansas	
19	227	Bob Edmiston	Tackle	Temple	
20	239	Frank Dipietro	Back	Georgia	
21	251	Howard Alsup	Tackle	Middle Tennessee	
22	263	Ralph Reynolds	Back	North Texas State	
23	275	LeRoy Fenstemaker	Back	Rice	
24	287	Jerry Daniels	Tackle	Tennessee Tech	
25	299	John Platt	Back	Elon	
26	311	Pete Bello	Center	Pasadena CC	
27	323	Gayford Baker	Guard	Omaha	
28	335	Bob Garbrecht	Back	Rice	
29	347	Ted Dunn	Back	Murray State	
30	359	Don Folks	End	Houston	
Made roster * Made at least one Pro Bowl during career

== Preseason ==
Week	Date	Opponent	Result	Record	Venue
1	August 8	Fort Ord	W 42–14	1–0	Kezar Stadium
2	August 15	New York Giants	W 43–35	2–0	Kezar Stadium
3	August 21	vs. Washington Redskins	W 30–7	3–0	Charles C. Hughes Stadium
4	September 29	Chicago Cardinals	W 42–7	4–0	Kezar Stadium
5	September 5	Cleveland Browns	W 38–21	5–0	Kezar Stadium
6	September 10	at Los Angeles Rams	W 28–27	6–0	Los Angeles Memorial Coliseum
7	September 15	vs. Pittsburgh Steelers	W 37–14	7–0	Arizona Stadium

== Schedule ==
Game	Date	Opponent	Result	Record	Venue	Attendance	Recap	Sources
1	September 26	Washington Redskins	**W** 41–7	1–0	Kezar Stadium	32,085	Recap	
2	October 3	at **Los Angeles Rams**	**T** 24–24	1–0–1	Los Angeles Memorial Coliseum	79,208	Recap	
3	October 10	at **Green Bay Packers**	**W** 23–17	2–0–1	Milwaukee County Stadium	15,571	Recap	
4	October 17	at **Chicago Bears**	**W** 31–24	3–0–1	Wrigley Field	42,935	Recap	
5	October 24	**Detroit Lions**	**W** 37–31	4–0–1	Kezar Stadium	58,891	Recap	
6	October 31	**Chicago Bears**	**L** 27–31	4–1–1	Kezar Stadium	49,833	Recap	
7	November 7	**Los Angeles Rams**	**L** 34–42	4–2–1	Kezar Stadium	58,758	Recap	
8	November 14	at **Detroit Lions**	**L** 7–48	4–3–1	Briggs Stadium	58,431	Recap	
9	November 20	at Pittsburgh Steelers	**W** 31–3	5–3–1	Forbes Field	37,001	Recap	
10	November 28	at **Baltimore Colts**	**L** 13–17	5–4–1	Memorial Stadium	23,875	Recap	
11	December 5	**Green Bay Packers**	**W** 35–0	6–4–1	Kezar Stadium	32,012	Recap	
12	December 11	**Baltimore Colts**	**W** 10–7	7–4–1	Kezar Stadium	25,456	Recap'	
Note: Intra-division opponents are in **bold** text.

=== Standings ===
NFL Western Conference
	W	L	T	PCT	CONF	PF	PA	STK
Detroit Lions	9	2	1	.818	8–2	337	189	W1
Chicago Bears	8	4	0	.667	7–3	301	279	W4
San Francisco 49ers	7	4	1	.636	5–4–1	313	251	W2
Los Angeles Rams	6	5	1	.545	4–5–1	314	285	W1
Green Bay Packers	4	8	0	.333	3–7	234	251	L4
Baltimore Colts	3	9	0	.250	2–8	131	279	L1

Note: Tie games were not officially counted in the standings until 1972.

== Final roster ==
1954 San Francisco 49ers roster
Quarterbacks: 12 Maury Duncan; 16 Arnie Galiffa; 14 Y. A. Tittle; Running backs: 35 John Henry Johnson CB/S; 34 Joe Perry; 24 Billy Tidwell; Receivers: 88 Harry Babcock; 85 Bill Jessup S; 82 Gordy Soltau K; 84 Billy Wilson	Offensive linemen: 63 Bruno Banducci G; 56 Pete Brown C/LB; 65 Ted Connolly G/T; 67 Nick Feher G; 64 Doug Hogland T; 53 Bill Johnson C; 79 Bob St. Clair T; Defensive linemen: 86 Jackson Brumfield DE; 76 Marion Campbell DT; 75 Al Carapella MG/DT; 69 Bob Hantla MG/G; 83 Clay Matthews DE; 73 Leo Nomellini DT	Linebackers: 33 Hardy Brown; 32 Frank Cassara; 48 Billy Mixon; 74 Bob Toneff MG; Defensive backs: 22 Joe Arenas CB/S/RB; 23 Rex Berry CB; 43 Jim Cason S; 89 Floyd Sagely CB/WR; 44 Pete Schabarum CB/RB; 25 Johnny Williams S/CB	Reserve lists: 66 Don Burke LB (IR); 39 Hugh McElhenny RB (IR); 62 Art Michalik MG (IR); -- Jerry Smith G (Military)

rookies in italics
