= Larry Strickland =

American football player (1931–1979)

No. 55
- Position: Center

Personal information
- Born: September 3, 1931; Tyler, Texas, U.S.
- Died: August 29, 1979 (aged 47); Tyler, Texas, U.S.
- Listed height: 6 ft 4 in (1.93 m)
- Listed weight: 248 lb (112 kg)

Career information
- High school: John Tyler
- College: North Texas
- NFL draft: 1953: 13th round, 151st overall pick

Career history
- Chicago Bears (1954–1959)

Awards and highlights
- First-team All-Pro (1956); Second-team All-Pro (1957); Pro Bowl (1956)

Career NFL statistics
- Games played: 62
- Games started: 48
- Fumble recoveries: 1
- Stats at Pro Football Reference

Larry Strickland (September 3, 1931 – August 29, 1979) was an American professional football player who was a center for six seasons with the Chicago Bears of the National Football League (NFL) between 1954 and 1959. He was a one-time Pro Bowler and one-time first-team All-Pro.

Strickland was born in Tyler, Texas. He played college football for the North Texas Mean Green and was selected by the Bears in the 13th round (150th overall) of the 1953 NFL draft. He was married to Betty Strickland and had no children.
