= Charles Oakley (American football) =

American football player (1931–2017)

No. 21
- Position: Defensive back

Personal information
- Born: July 7, 1931; Montgomery, Alabama, U.S.
- Died: April 10, 2017 (aged 85); Lebanon, Tennessee, U.S.
- Listed height: 5 ft 10 in (1.78 m)
- Listed weight: 170 lb (77 kg)

Career information
- High school: Lake Charles (LA)
- College: LSU
- NFL draft: 1954: 23rd round, 266th overall pick

Career history
- Chicago Cardinals (1954)

Career NFL statistics
- Games played: 1
- Stats at Pro Football Reference

Charles Lynn Oakley (July 7, 1931 – April 10, 2017) was an American professional football player. He was selected 266th overall by the Chicago Cardinals in the 23rd round of the 1954 NFL draft, with whom he played for one game as a defensive back, in 1954. He attended Louisiana State University, where he played college football for the LSU Tigers football team. He was born in Montgomery, Alabama and attended high school in Lake Charles, Louisiana. Oakley died on April 10, 2017, at the age of 85.
