= Don Joyce (American football) =

American football player and wrestler (1929–2012)

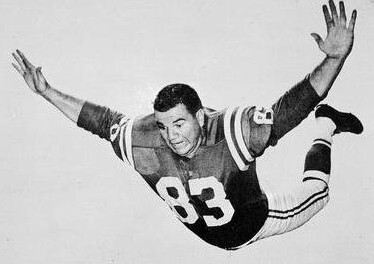
- Joyce, c. 1960

No. 11, 71, 76, 83
- Positions: Defensive end, defensive tackle

Personal information
- Born: October 8, 1929; Steubenville, Ohio, U.S.
- Died: February 26, 2012 (aged 82); Mahtomedi, Minnesota, U.S.
- Listed height: 6 ft 3 in (1.91 m)
- Listed weight: 253 lb (115 kg)

Career information
- High school: Steubenville
- College: Tulane (1947–1950)
- NFL draft: 1951: 2nd round, 18th overall pick

Career history
- Chicago Cardinals (1951–1953); Baltimore Colts (1954–1960); Minnesota Vikings (1961); Denver Broncos (1962)

Awards and highlights
- 2× NFL champion (1958, 1959); Pro Bowl (1958)

Career NFL/AFL statistics
- Interceptions: 1
- Fumble recoveries: 5
- Stats at Pro Football Reference

Donald Gilbert Joyce (October 8, 1929 – February 26, 2012) was an American professional football player and professional wrestler. He played as a defensive end in the National Football League (NFL), and was on the Baltimore Colts championship defensive line of the late 1950s. He recovered a fumble in the 1958 NFL Championship Game, often called “the Greatest Game Ever Played". He played college football for the Tulane Green Wave. He became a longtime college football scout after his playing career ended. During one scouting trip, when he was 52-years old, he and his wife were abducted at gunpoint, and he was shot twice defending his wife from the assailant.

== Early life ==
Joyce was born on October 8, 1929, in Steubenville, Ohio, to James and Frances Joyce. He attended Steubenville High School, where he was an end as a junior, and quarterback and punter as a senior on the football team. He weighed 195 lb (88.5 kg) as a senior.

== College career ==
Joyce attended Tulane University where he played on the football team in the Southeastern Conference (SEC). At Tulane, he lettered in both 1949 and 1950 and was inducted into Tulane's Hall of Fame class of 1979. He was a member of the Green Wave's last Southeastern Conference championship team in 1949 (Tulane withdrew from the SEC following the 1965 football season).

He played both offensive tackle and defensive tackle, as well as being the team's placekicker. In an unexpectedly close October 1950 game against Notre Dame, where Tulane lost 13–9, Joyce had a safety against quarterback Bob Williams. Joyce was selected to play in the 1950 Blue Gray Game, and the second annual Senior Bowl, held in January 1951. In future years Joyce was a regular attendee at the Senior Bowl and its leadup each year, and became known as "Mr. Senior Bowl". In 1950, Joyce received votes in the Atlanta Constitution's poll of SEC coaches as both the best offensive and defensive tackle.

Joyce also threw the discus and shot put on Tulane's track team.

== Professional career ==
=== Chicago Cardinals ===
In the 1951 National Football League Draft, Joyce was picked 18th overall by the Chicago Cardinals, in the second round. He started one game for the Cardinals in 1951, and 11 games for the Cardinals the following season at tackle. In the opening game of the 1952 season against the Washington Redskins, the 6 ft 3 in (1.91 m) 250 lb (113.4 kg) 23-year old Joyce got into a fist fight with future Hall of Famer Sammy Baugh, Washington's 38-year old quarterback and coach. This resulted in both being ejected from the game. As stated at the time, "It was the first time in the pro career of the usually calm Baugh – starting his 16th season with the Redskins – that he had been" ejected. In a November 30 game, Joyce sacked Philadelphia Eagles quarterback Bobby Thomason in the end zone, and Joyce's teammate Volney Peters recovered the ensuing fumble for a Cardinals' touchdown, in an upset victory for the Cardinals.

In 1953, Joyce started eight of 10 games in which he appeared for the Cardinals. In a September 13 game against the San Francisco 49ers, Joyce got into an altercation with 49ers center Bill Johnson. Johnson accused Joyce, whom he considered a friend, of giving Johnson a knee to the stomach earlier in the game. Two plays after their altercation, Joyce was carried off the field.

=== Baltimore Colts ===
The Cardinals traded Joyce to the Baltimore Colts before the 1954 season for Bill Lange. He started all 12 games that season at right defensive end for the Colts. In a December 5 game against the Los Angeles Rams, Rams guard Les Richter alleged that Joyce had pulled Richter's helmet off his head and then hit Richter in the face with the helmet. Richter needed 14 or 15 stitches over his right eye, and the incident was argued to be part of a trend across the NFL where "dirty tactics" were injuring the league's top players. Colts future Hall of Fame coach Weeb Ewbank reportedly said after the game that Joyce's actions were "'uncalled for'" and he had told his players not to retaliate even if provoked. Joyce was ejected from the game. The following season Life magazine used a photo of an agonized Richter lying on the ground as part of an article on savagery in football, implying it was the result of Joyce’s dirty tactics. The Rams demanded that NFL Commissioner Bert Bell punish Joyce. Commissioner Bell fined Joyce $300.

Joyce, however, denied Richter's version of events, and the Colts President Don Kellett said movies of the play would vindicate Joyce (Kellett also claiming Joyce had been struck in the groin). Joyce said that during the first quarter play at issue, Richter had kneed Joyce in the thigh and elbowed Joyce in the face. Joyce said that even after the play ended Richter came to knee him again, so Joyce thrust out his left arm, palm open, to keep Richter at a distance. Joyce believed his palm hit Richter's face guard which then went into Richter's face. Commissioner Bell held the fine in abeyance until he could review movies of the game to try to get at what actually occurred. After reviewing the game movie, Bell determined that Joyce's version reflected what had occurred, and that he had been acting in self-defense. Bell rescinded the fine. One of Joyce’s obituaries states that before that game the Rams had offered a $100 bounty to any of their players who could knock Joyce out of the game.

The Rams had lost the game at issue, with their coach Hampton Pool observing that it was the play of the overwhelming Colts defense and their huge defensive line, including Joyce and future Hall of Famers defensive end Gino Marchetti and defensive tackle Art Donovan, among others, that defeated the Rams. It was one of only three wins for the Colts in 1954. In 1955, the Colts went 5–6–1, with Joyce starting 11 games at right defensive end. In addition to having Marchetti and Donovan, in 1955 the team added rookies Alan Ameche (the 1954 Heisman Trophy winner) and future Hall of Fame receiver Raymond Berry.

In 1956, Joyce again started all 12 games at right defensive end. The team had a 5–7 record, but was joined by two future Hall of Fame players, quarterback Johnny Unitas and running back/flanker Lenny Moore, and defensive tackle Eugene "Big Daddy" Lipscomb, who would become a two-time All-Pro with the Colts (1958-59). The Colts defensive line now consisted of Joyce at right end, Lipscomb at right tackle, Donovan at left tackle and Marchetti at left end. This line has been called the original "Fearsome Foursome" and the prototype of modern defensive lines.

In 1957, the Colts had their first winning season (7–5), and were joined by rookie Jim Parker, a future Hall of Fame offensive tackle and guard. Joyce again started all 12 games at right defensive end. The team now included five players considered among the top 100 players in NFL history (Berry, Marchetti, Moore, Parker and Unitas). The 1957 Colts' defense led the NFL in holding opposing runners to 3.1 yards per carry.

In 1958 and 1959 the Colts won the NFL championship over the New York Giants. During the 1958 championship game, often called “the Greatest Game Ever Played", Joyce recovered a Frank Gifford fumble during the first half, after which the Colts moved 86 yards in 14 plays for a touchdown. Joyce started 11 games at right end in 1958 and was named to the Pro Bowl following the 1958 season, to replace Marchetti who suffered a broken leg in the championship game; joining Pro Bowl teammates Lipscomb, Ameche, Berry, Moore, Parker and Unitas. In 1959, he started 10 games at right end. From 1957 to 1959, although Joyce started almost every game, he shared playing time at right defensive end with Ordell Braase. In 1960, Braase became the starter at right defensive end, with Joyce playing as a reserve.

=== Minnesota Vikings and Denver Broncos ===
The Colts left Joyce exposed in the 1961 expansion draft, and he was selected by the Minnesota Vikings in their inaugural season. He started seven games for the Vikings in 1961. The Vikings released him before the start of the 1962 season. In 1962, Joyce played for the American Football League's Denver Broncos. This was Joyce's final season. He suffered a variety of injuries with the Broncos, and played only six games for the Broncos, starting in two, before the Broncos waived him in November. Joyce realized his career had ended, and hoped to go into coaching, even at the high school level.

=== Reputation ===
Joyce's son, Don Jr., said Raymond Berry called Joyce the meanest player in the NFL. Berry also said because Joyce was so big and strong he could not be easily moved or blocked, so teams would have to maneuver around him on running plays. He was one of the first defensive linemen to use the later-banned head slap technique. Former NFL linebacker Carl Brettschneider (1956-63), who was known in part for using the straight-arm clothesline technique across the necks of receivers, said Joyce was among the group of players during his time who played in that rough style. Brettschneider said "'You couldn't turn your back on Don Joyce'".

Joyce boasted that he never lost an NFL fight. In addition to his fights with Baugh, Johnson and Richter, among other fights Joyce was punched by Green Bay Packer tackle Bob Skoronski in the first quarter of an October 1956 game with the Colts; Skoronski being immediately ejected. The Green Bay media said Skoronski was retaliating after being hit by Joyce, but the referee only saw Skoronski's punch. Joyce also had a history of fights with New York Giants’ Hall of Fame offensive tackle Roosevelt Brown. They got in two fights in the 1958 preseason, during an exhibition game in Baltimore in which Brown was said to have gotten the best of Joyce, but was ejected; and another in Louisville. They were speaking negatively of each other publicly up to the day before the 1958 championship game between the Colts and Giants.

One of Joyce's obituaries said Joyce broke Brown’s jaw during a Giants-Colts game. In his book on the 1958 championship game, New York Giant Hall of Fame running back Frank Gifford writes that Joyce and Brown had a feud and history of fighting, and that Joyce once broke Brown's cheekbone during a game with a lacrosse pad Joyce was wearing under his jersey. However, in a 1964 biographical piece on Brown based on information provided by Brown, the New York Times detailed how Brown suffered the broken cheekbone against the Colts when he was crushed between Lipscomb and Marchetti, shattering Brown’s helmet and breaking his cheekbone; not as a result of any action by Joyce.

Joyce also had a reputation as a tremendous eater, once easily defeating Marchetti in a fried chicken eating contest and earning a $500 pool of money put up by their teammates for the victor. Former New York Giants general manager George Young called Joyce "'the biggest eater I've ever seen'".

== Scouting career ==
Joyce was a football scout for thirty years, including seven years as the head scout for the Colts until 1995. He originally scouted for the Vikings. After that, for nearly 20 years (as of 1987) Joyce was a regional then national scout for BLESTO, a college scouting combine for multiple NFL teams. At BLESTO, it was his responsibility to evaluate the top 100 to 150 college prospects nationally. Bob Terpening, a Colts' assistant general manager, said "'As a scout, he did complete and thorough work. I thought he had a good eye for talent, and he was a very good evaluator'".

In 1988, the Green Bay Press-Gazette interviewed 18 NFL general managers and personnel directors to rate the best scouts in the NFL. At the time, Joyce was a national scout for Blesto. He was rated the eighth-best among all NFL scouts.

== Professional wrestling career ==
Joyce was a professional wrestler during the football off-season. Debuting in 1956, he worked mainly in and around the Baltimore, Maryland area for Vincent J. McMahon. He wrestled exclusively as a face ("good guy") character, owing to his NFL contract which stated he could not work as a heel ("bad guy"). He sometimes teamed with Gene Lipscomb. He and Lipscomb also sought wrestling opportunities in California. Joyce and Lipscomb wrestled in a tag team match against the San Francisco 49ers Leo Nomellini, and Tom Rice, in Northern California in January 1960. During his professional wrestling career, Joyce became a one-time NWA United States Television Champion. His wrestling nickname was “the Champ”. After ending his football career in 1962, he was living in Mahtometi, Minnesota. He realized between past injuries and the traveling distances he would be required to drive from his Minnesota home to even the nearest matches, it would be impractical to continue his wrestling career.

== Personal life and death ==
Joyce was married and had four children. His son Don Jr. received a football scholarship to Tulane. After retiring from football and professional wrestling, Joyce worked as a football coach and physical education teacher at DeLaSalle High School in Minneapolis for five years, before entering his scouting career.

In 1983, Joyce and his wife were driving from Minnesota to Mobile, Alabama so he could scout the Senior Bowl. They stopped at a hotel in Sikeston, Missouri, and were surprised in the parking lot by an armed man, and forced into their hotel room at gunpoint. Joyce estimated the man to be in his mid-30s and 275 pounds (124.7 kg). The Joyces were robbed and Joyce was tied up, gagged and locked in the bathroom. The assailant intended to assault his wife, Sharon; telling Joyce he should remain quiet or be killed. Joyce broke free and charged the man and struggled for the gun. Joyce was shot twice, with one bullet passing through his back and another through his chest and lodging in his shoulder. Joyce required surgery to remove the bullet from his shoulder. His wife suffered a head injury after being pistol-whipped, but both made a full recovery.

Joyce died on February 26, 2012, in Mahtomedi, Minnesota, and was buried on March 2. He was survived by his wife and three children, along with grandchildren and great-grandchildren, but was predeceased by a son, Bobby Joyce.

== See also ==
- List of gridiron football players who became professional wrestlers
- Other American Football League players
