= Maurice Bassett =

American football player (1931–1991)

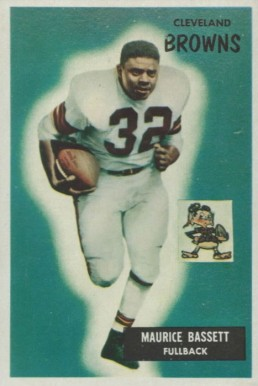
- Bassett on a 1955 Bowman football card

No. 38, 30
- Position: Fullback

Personal information
- Born: April 26, 1931; Chickasha, Oklahoma, U.S.
- Died: May 24, 1991 (aged 60); Springfield, Ohio, U.S.
- Listed height: 6 ft 1 in (1.85 m)
- Listed weight: 230 lb (104 kg)

Career information
- College: Langston
- NFL draft: 1954: 3rd round, 36th overall pick

Career history
- Cleveland Browns (1954–1956); Ottawa Rough Riders (1957)*; Buffalo Bills (1960)*
- * Offseason or practice squad member only

Awards and highlights
- 2× NFL champion (1954, 1955)

Career NFL statistics
- Rushing yards: 891
- Rushing average: 4
- Receptions: 33
- Receiving yards: 317
- Total touchdowns: 11
- Stats at Pro Football Reference

Maurice LaFrancis Bassett (April 26, 1931 – May 24, 1991), sometimes known by the nickname "Mo", was an American professional football player. He played fullback in the National Football League (NFL) for the Cleveland Browns from 1954 to 1956. He played college football for the Langston Lions.

== Early life ==
Bassett was born in 1931 in Chickasha, Oklahoma. He attended Lincoln High School in Chickasha. He was raised by his mother who was blind.

Bassett attended Langston University, a historically black university in Oklahoma. He was inducted into the Langston Athletic Hall of Fame posthumously in 2021.

After his time at Langston, and before his time in the NFL, Bassett served in the Navy.

== Professional football ==
Bassett was selected by the Cleveland Browns in the third round, 36th overall pick, of the 1954 NFL draft. As a rookie, he appeared in 12 games, 10 as the team's starting fullback for the 1954 Cleveland Browns team that won the NFL championship. Bassett ranked third in the NFL with 588 rushing yards in 1954. He also ranked seventh in the NFL with six rushing touchdowns. The Cleveland news media gives the annual Maurice Barrett award to the most promising first-year player in training camp.

In 1955, Bassett appeared in 10 games as a backup to Ed Modzelewski. Bassett finished the 1955 season with 174 rushing yards and three touchdowns. The Browns won their second consecutive NFL championship in 1955. In 1956, Bassett started four games and was otherwise a backup to Modzelewski. Bassett gained 129 yards and one touchdown. He totaled 891 rushing yards and 11 touchdowns in his three years in the NFL. Cleveland head coach Paul Brown said of Bassett: "[T]here's nothing flashy about Maurice Barrett. He just stays out there and saws wood until the job is done."

Bassett concluded his playing career in the Canadian Football League. He played for the Buffalo Bills in the 1960 preseason but was released in August 1960.

== Later life ==
Bassett married Dorothy Shelby. They had three children: Maurice Jr., Kevin, and Stacey. After his playing career ended, Bassett taught industrial arts at high schools in the Cleveland area.

Bassett had several strokes and suffered from diabetes in later years. He had both legs amputated due to diabetes. The family moved to Dayton, Ohio, and Bassett spent the last months of his life confined to the Dayton Veterans Affairs Medical Center. He died there in 1991 at age 60.
