= List of Holy Cross Crusaders in the NFL draft =

This is a list of Holy Cross Crusaders football players in the NFL draft.

== Key ==
B	Back	K	Kicker	NT	Nose tackle
C	Center	LB	Linebacker	FB	Fullback
DB	Defensive back	P	Punter	HB	Halfback
DE	Defensive end	QB	Quarterback	WR	Wide receiver
DT	Defensive tackle	RB	Running back	G	Guard
E	End	T	Offensive tackle	TE	Tight end

== Selections ==
Year	Round	Pick	Overall	Player	Team	Position
1936	9	9	81	Phil Flanagan	New York Giants	G
1937	10	9	99	Dave Gavin	Green Bay Packers	T
1938	12	5	105	Bob Mautner	Chicago Cardinals	C
1939	1	6	6	Bill Osmanski	Chicago Bears	B
1939	5	6	36	Joe Delaney	Chicago Bears	T
1940	10	4	84	Jim Turner	Brooklyn Dodgers	G
1941	18	10	170	Joe Osmanski	Washington Redskins	B
1941	22	1	196	Bruno Malinowski	Green Bay Packers	B
1942	3	10	25	Joe Boratyn	Chicago Bears	B
1942	5	6	36	Joe Zeno	Washington Redskins	G
1942	20	8	188	Adam Kretowicz	New York Giants	E
1943	2	4	14	John Grigas	Chicago Cardinals	B
1943	9	7	77	Ed Murphy	Pittsburgh Steelers	E
1943	13	5	115	Tom Alberghini	Cleveland Rams	G
1943	19	2	172	Johnny Bezemes	Philadelphia Eagles	B
1943	27	6	256	Ed McNamara	New York Giants	T
1944	8	4	69	George Titus	Pittsburgh Steelers	C
1944	11	1	99	Fran Griffin	Chicago Cardinals	T
1944	21	9	217	Bob Lawson	Pittsburgh Steelers	E
1944	29	11	307	Chet Wasilewski	Boston Yanks	B
1944	30	7	314	Bill Yablonski	Washington Redskins	C
1945	11	1	99	Ray Ball	Pittsburgh Steelers	B
1945	14	4	135	John DiGangi	Boston Yanks	T
1945	16	5	158	Bob Barton	Cleveland Rams	E
1945	18	3	178	Alex Wizbicki	Pittsburgh Steelers	B
1946	3	9	24	Stan Kozlowski	Washington Redskins	B
1946	10	6	86	Joe McAfee	Green Bay Packers	B
1946	11	6	96	Steve Conroy	Green Bay Packers	B
1946	12	10	110	Ted Strojny	Cleveland Rams	T
1946	28	6	266	Joe Campbell	Green Bay Packers	E
1947	12	2	97	Wally Roberts	Boston Yanks	E
1947	15	2	157	Frank Parker	Boston Yanks	T
1947	18	3	158	Bill Cregar	Pittsburgh Steelers	C
1947	29	8	273	John Comer	Los Angeles Rams	B
1949	13	3	124	Jim Dieckelman	Boston Yanks	E
1949	17	4	165	Veto Kissell	Pittsburgh Steelers	B
1950	16	2	198	Bill Stetter	New York Bulldogs	C
1950	24	1	301	Bill Petroski	Baltimore Colts	C
1951	11	1	124	Bill DeChard	Washington Redskins	B
1951	20	6	237	Tom Donnelly	Pittsburgh Steelers	T
1951	29	8	347	Veto Kissell	New York Yanks	B
1952	10	3	112	John Feltch	Chicago Cardinals	T
1952	13	2	147	Mel Massucco	Chicago Cardinals	B
1952	22	4	257	Johnny Turco	Philadelphia Eagles	B
1953	10	6	115	Vic Rimkus	Green Bay Packers	G
1953	10	7	116	Charlie Maloy	New York Giants	QB
1954	10	12	121	Jack Carroll	Detroit Lions	E
1955	19	3	220	Bob Dee	Washington Redskins	E
1955	24	11	288	Bob Flacke	Detroit Lions	G
1956	18	2	207	John Stephens	Pittsburgh Steelers	QB
1957	10	12	121	Gordon Massa	New York Giants	C
1959	6	6	66	Tony Bavaro	San Francisco 49ers	T
1959	17	4	196	Jim Healy	Washington Redskins	G
1960	4	12	48	Vince Promuto	Washington Redskins	G
1961	12	11	165	Jack Moynihan	New York Giants	QB
1961	18	11	249	Ken DesMarais	New York Giants	C
1963	16	6	216	Dennis Golden	Dallas Cowboys	T
1964	2	13	27	Jon Morris	Green Bay Packers	C
1967	9	8	219	Bill Morris	Minnesota Vikings	G
1967	16	6	399	Jack Lentz	Denver Broncos	QB
1970	14	3	341	Gary Brackett	Miami Dolphins	G
1970	15	17	381	Vic Lewandowski	Washington Redskins	C
1972	7	5	161	Bill Adams	Miami Dolphins	G
1972	11	25	285	Ed Jenkins	Miami Dolphins	WR
1973	8	17	199	Joe Wilson	Cincinnati Bengals	RB
1974	9	11	219	Mark Sheridan	Philadelphia Eagles	WR
1974	11	16	276	Steve Buchanan	Denver Broncos	RB
1976	14	7	382	David Quehl	New England Patriots	WR
1984	9	7	231	Bruce Kozerski	Cincinnati Bengals	C
1984	12	8	316	Steve Raquet	Cincinnati Bengals	LB
1986	7	7	173	Gill Fenerty	New Orleans Saints	RB
1988	9	15	236	Gordie Lockbaum	Pittsburgh Steelers	RB
1988	11	15	292	Tom Kelleher	Miami Dolphins	RB
1989	10	4	255	Rob McGovern	Kansas City Chiefs	LB
2024	7	28	248	C. J. Hanson	Kansas City Chiefs	G

== Notable undrafted players ==
Note: No drafts held before 1936

Debut year	Player name	Position	Debut NFL/AFL team	Notes
1982	John Andreoli	LB	Washington Redskins	—
1982	Dave Boisture	QB	New York Jets	—
1985	Peter Quinlan	DL	Green Bay Packers	—
1987	Jerry McCabe	LB	New England Patriots	—
1990	Dave Murphy	S	Seattle Seahawks	—
2001	Dave Puloka	LB	Cincinnati Bengals	—
2016	Kalif Raymond	WR	Denver Broncos	—
2018	Peter Pujals	QB	Minnesota Vikings	—
2024	Jalen Coker	WR	Carolina Panthers	—
