= 1954 Pittsburgh Steelers season =

NFL team season

- Head coach: Walt Kiesling
- Home stadium: Forbes Field

Results
- Record: 5–7
- Division place: 4th NFL Eastern
- Playoffs: Did not qualify

The 1954 Pittsburgh Steelers season was the franchise's 22nd in the National Football League.

== Regular season ==
=== Schedule ===
Week	Date	Opponent	Result	Record
1	September 26	at Green Bay Packers	W 21–20	1–0
2	October 2	Washington Redskins	W 37–7	2–0
3	October 9	at Philadelphia Eagles	L 22–24	2–1
4	October 17	Cleveland Browns	W 55–27	3–1
5	October 23	Philadelphia Eagles	W 17–7	4–1
6	October 31	at Chicago Cardinals	L 14–17	4–2
7	November 7	New York Giants	L 6–30	4–3
8	November 14	at Washington Redskins	L 14–17	4–4
9	November 20	San Francisco 49ers	L 3–31	4–5
10	November 28	Chicago Cardinals	W 20–17	5–5
11	December 5	at New York Giants	L 3–24	5–6
12	December 12	at Cleveland Browns	L 7–42	5–7

=== Game summaries ===
==== Week 1 (Sunday September 26, 1954): Green Bay Packers ====
	1	2	3	4	Total
Steelers	7	7	0	7	21
Packers	7	10	3	0	20

at City Stadium, Green Bay, Wisconsin

- Game time:
- Game weather:
- Game attendance: 20,675
- Referee:
- TV announcers:

Scoring Drives:

- Green Bay – Reid 69 run (Cone kick)
- Pittsburgh – Lattner 14 pass from Finks (Kissell kick)
- Green Bay – Howton 44 pass from Rote (Cone kick)
- Green Bay – FG Cone 45
- Pittsburgh – Nickel 2 pass from Finks (Kissell kick)
- Green Bay – FG Cone 32
- Pittsburgh – Mathews 37 pass from Finks (Held kick)

==== Week 2 (Saturday October 2, 1954): Washington Redskins ====
	1	2	3	4	Total
Redskins	0	0	0	7	7
Steelers	13	14	7	3	37

at Forbes Field, Pittsburgh, Pennsylvania

- Game time:
- Game weather:
- Game attendance: 22,492
- Referee:
- TV announcers:

Scoring Drives:

- Pittsburgh – Nickel 25 pass from Held (Held kick)
- Pittsburgh – Lattner 1 run (kick blocked)
- Pittsburgh – Rogel 1 run (Held kick)
- Pittsburgh – Sulima 5 pass from Finks (Held kick)
- Pittsburgh – Brandt 9 run (Held kick)
- Washington – Dorow 1 run (Felton kick)
- Pittsburgh – FG Held 15

==== Week 3 (Saturday October 9, 1954): Philadelphia Eagles ====
	1	2	3	4	Total
Steelers	3	9	7	3	22
Eagles	14	3	0	7	24

at Connie Mack Stadium, Philadelphia, Pennsylvania

- Game time:
- Game weather:
- Game attendance: 37,322
- Referee:
- TV announcers:

Scoring Drives:

- Pittsburgh – FG Held 31
- Philadelphia – Walston 24 pass from Thomason (Walston kick)
- Philadelphia – Williams 11 run (Walston kick)
- Philadelphia – FG Walston 14
- Pittsburgh – Butler 23 interception (Held kick)
- Pittsburgh – Safety, Thomason tackled in end zone by McPeak
- Pittsburgh – Lattner 7 run (Held kick)
- Pittsburgh – FG Held 17
- Philadelphia – Pihos 13 pass from Burk (Walston kick)

==== Week 4 (Sunday October 17, 1954): Cleveland Browns ====
	1	2	3	4	Total
Browns	14	6	0	7	27
Steelers	7	27	14	7	55

at Forbes Field, Pittsburgh, Pennsylvania

- Game time:
- Game weather:
- Game attendance: 31,256
- Referee:
- TV announcers:

Scoring Drives:

- Cleveland – Reynolds 5 run (Groza kick)
- Pittsburgh – Mathews 7 pass from Finks (Held kick)
- Cleveland – Jones 37 pass from Graham (Groza kick)
- Pittsburgh – Rogel 14 pass from Finks (kick failed)
- Pittsburgh – Butler 41 interception (Held kick)
- Pittsburgh – Lattner 12 run (Held kick)
- Cleveland – Lavelli 29 pass from Graham (kick blocked)
- Pittsburgh – Mathews 78 pass from Finks (Held kick)
- Pittsburgh – Mathews 8 pass from Finks (Held kick)
- Pittsburgh – Mathews 3 run (Held kick)
- Cleveland – Lavelli 24 pass from Graham (Groza kick)
- Pittsburgh – Craft 81 interception (Held kick)

==== Week 5 (Saturday October 23, 1954): Philadelphia Eagles ====
	1	2	3	4	Total
Eagles	0	0	0	7	7
Steelers	0	3	7	7	17

at Forbes Field, Pittsburgh, Pennsylvania

- Game time:
- Game weather:
- Game attendance: 39,075
- Referee:
- TV announcers:

Scoring Drives:

- Pittsburgh – FG Kissell 24
- Pittsburgh – Nickel 52 pass from Burk (Walston kick)
- Philadelphia – Pihos 24 pass from Burk (Walston kick)
- Pittsburgh – Chandnois 5 run (Kissell kick)

==== Week 6 (Sunday October 31, 1954): Chicago Cardinals ====
	1	2	3	4	Total
Steelers	7	0	0	7	14
Cardinals	7	0	3	7	17

at Comiskey Park, Chicago, Illinois

- Game time:
- Game weather:
- Game attendance: 18,765
- Referee:
- TV announcers:

Scoring Drives:

- Pittsburgh – Nickel 15 pass from Finks (Kissell kick)
- Chicago Cardinals – Matson 91 kick return (Summerall kick)
- Chicago Cardinals – FG Summerall 24
- Chicago Cardinals – Matson 18 pass from McHan (Summerall kick)
- Pittsburgh – Lattner 1 run (Kissell kick)

==== Week 7 (Sunday November 7, 1954): New York Giants ====
	1	2	3	4	Total
Giants	9	14	7	0	30
Steelers	0	6	0	0	6

at Forbes Field, Pittsburgh, Pennsylvania

- Game time:
- Game weather:
- Game attendance: 25,158
- Referee:
- TV announcers:

Scoring Drives:

- New York Giants – Safety, Chandnois recovered blocked punt in own end zone, tackled by Nolan
- New York Giants – MacAfee 21 pass from Conerly (Agajanian kick)
- Pittsburgh – Lattner 5 run (kick blocked)
- New York Giants – Rote 23 pass from Conerly (Agajanian kick)
- New York Giants – Price 2 run (Agajanian kick)
- New York Giants – Topp 14 pass from Conerly (Agajanian kick)

==== Week 8 (Sunday November 14, 1954): Washington Redskins ====
	1	2	3	4	Total
Steelers	0	7	0	7	14
Redskins	0	7	3	7	17

at Griffith Stadium, Washington, DC

- Game time:
- Game weather:
- Game attendance: 19,388
- Referee:
- TV announcers:

Scoring Drives:

- Washington – Wells 9 run (Janowicz kick)
- Pittsburgh – Lattner 24 pass from Finks (Kissell kick)
- Washington – FG Janowicz 32
- Washington – Taylor 42 pass from Scarbath (Janowicz kick)
- Pittsburgh – Nickel 4 pass from Finks (Kissell kick)

==== Week 9 (Saturday November 20, 1954): San Francisco 49ers ====
	1	2	3	4	Total
49ers	3	21	0	7	31
Steelers	0	3	0	0	3

at Forbes Field, Pittsburgh, Pennsylvania

- Game time:
- Game weather:
- Game attendance: 37,001
- Referee:
- TV announcers:

Scoring Drives:

- San Francisco – FG Soltau 24
- San Francisco – Jessup 44 pass from Tittle (Soltau kick)
- Pittsburgh – FG Kissell 31
- San Francisco – Perry 2 run (Soltau kick)
- San Francisco – Johnson 24 run (Soltau kick)
- San Francisco – Jessup 24 pass from Tittle (Soltau kick)

==== Week 10 (Sunday November 28, 1954): Chicago Cardinals ====
	1	2	3	4	Total
Cardinals	0	14	3	0	17
Steelers	0	10	0	10	20

at Forbes Field, Pittsburgh, Pennsylvania

- Game time:
- Game weather:
- Game attendance: 17,460
- Referee:
- TV announcers:

Scoring Drives:

- Pittsburgh – FG Bolkovac 21
- Pittsburgh – Mathews 29 pass from Finks (Bolkovac kick)
- Chicago Cardinals – Stonesifer 39 pass from McHan (Summerall kick)
- Chicago Cardinals – Matson 60 pass from McHan (Summerall kick)
- Chicago Cardinals – FG Summerall 34
- Pittsburgh – Mathews 3 run (Bolkovac kick)
- Pittsburgh – FG Bolkovac 26

==== Week 11 (Sunday December 5, 1954): New York Giants ====
	1	2	3	4	Total
Steelers	3	0	0	0	3
Giants	7	7	7	3	24

at Polo Grounds, New York, New York

- Game time:
- Game weather:
- Game attendance: 16,856
- Referee:
- TV announcers:

Scoring Drives:

- New York Giants – Price 7 run (Agajanian kick)
- Pittsburgh – FG Bolkovac 15
- New York Giants – MacAfee 42 pass from Clatterbuck (Agajanian kick)
- New York Giants – Rote 42 pass from Clatterbuck (Agajanian kick)
- New York Giants – FG Agajanian 20

==== Week 12 (Sunday December 12, 1954): Cleveland Browns ====
	1	2	3	4	Total
Steelers	0	0	7	0	7
Browns	7	21	0	14	42

at Cleveland Municipal Stadium, Cleveland, Ohio

- Game time:
- Game weather:
- Game attendance: 28,064
- Referee:
- TV announcers:

Scoring Drives:

- Cleveland – Hanulak 13 run (Groza kick)
- Cleveland – Konz 54 interception (Groza kick)
- Cleveland – Hanulak 3 run (Groza kick)
- Cleveland – Hanulak 8 run (Groza kick)
- Pittsburgh – Mathews 47 pass from Finks (Bolkovac kick)
- Cleveland – Morrison 2 run (Groza kick)
- Cleveland – Reynolds 3 run (Groza kick)

=== Standings ===
NFL Eastern Conference
	W	L	T	PCT	CONF	PF	PA	STK
Cleveland Browns	9	3	0	.750	8–2	336	162	L1
Philadelphia Eagles	7	4	1	.636	7–3	284	230	W1
New York Giants	7	5	0	.583	7–3	293	184	L1
Pittsburgh Steelers	5	7	0	.417	4–6	219	263	L2
Washington Redskins	3	9	0	.250	2–8	207	432	W1
Chicago Cardinals	2	10	0	.167	2–8	183	347	L3

Note: Tie games were not officially counted in the standings until 1972.

== Roster ==
1954 Pittsburgh Steelers roster
Quarterbacks (QB): 7 Jim Finks; 17 Paul Held K; Running backs (RB): 27 Jim Brandt S; 49 Lynn Chandnois; 39 Leo Elter; 41 Johnny Lattner; 25 Ray Mathews; 33 Fran Rogel; Wide receivers (WR): 81 Elbie Nickel; 88 George Sulima; Tight ends (TE)	Offensive linemen (OL): 77 Gus Cifelli T; 72 Bob Gaona T; 65 George Hughes T; 62 Pete Ladygo G; 74 Joe Matesic T; 66 John Schweder G/MG; 56 Bill Walsh C; Defensive linemen (DL): 89 Nick Bolkovac DT/K; 83 Dewey Brundage DE; 60 Dale Dodrill MG; 78 Lou Ferry DT; 84 Bill McPeak DE; 70 Ernie Stautner DT; 82 Joe Zombek DE	Linebackers (LB): 50 Stan Sheriff; 61 Lou Tepe C; Defensive backs (DB): 80 Jack Butler CB/WR; 35 Tom Calvin S/RB; 34 Paul Cameron S; 24 Russ Craft CB; 26 Dewey McConnell S/CB; 37 Burrell Shields S/RB; Special teams (ST): 18 Pat Brady P	Reserve: -- Art DeCarlo CB (Military); 57 Dick Flanagan LB (IR); -- Don Fritz CB (Military); -- Ed Kissell S/K (Military); -- Ted Marchibroda QB (Military); -- Marv Matuszak LB (Military); -- Marv McFadden G (Military); -- Ed Modzelewski RB (Military); 89 Jack O'Brien WR (IR); 77 Tom Palmer DT (IR); -- George Tarasovic DE (Military); Rookies in italics
