= 1954 Chicago Cardinals season =

American football team season

- Head coach: Joe Stydahar
- Home stadium: Comiskey Park

Results
- Record: 2–10
- Division place: 6th NFL Eastern
- Playoffs: Did not qualify

The 1954 Chicago Cardinals season marked the 35th year the team was in the National Football League (NFL). While the team improved on their previous season of 1–10–1 by winning two games, they failed to qualify for the playoffs for the sixth consecutive season.

In 1954 the Cardinals became the first NFL team in history to allow 30 or more points in each of its first five games in a season.

== Schedule ==
Week	Date	Opponent	Result	Record	Venue	Attendance
1	September 26	**New York Giants**	**L** 10–41	0–1	Comiskey Park	16,780
2	October 3	**Philadelphia Eagles**	**L** 16–35	0–2	Comiskey Park	17,084
3	October 10	at **Cleveland Browns**	**L** 7–31	0–3	Cleveland Municipal Stadium	24,101
4	October 17	at **New York Giants**	**L** 17–31	0–4	Polo Grounds	31,256
5	October 24	**Cleveland Browns**	**L** 3–35	0–5	Comiskey Park	23,823
6	October 31	**Pittsburgh Steelers**	**W** 17–14	1–5	Comiskey Park	18,765
7	November 7	at **Philadelphia Eagles**	**L** 14–30	1–6	Connie Mack Stadium	21,963
8	November 14	at Los Angeles Rams	**L** 17–28	1–7	Los Angeles Memorial Coliseum	40,739
9	November 21	**Washington Redskins**	**W** 38–16	2–7	Comiskey Park	15,619
10	November 28	at **Pittsburgh Steelers**	**L** 17–20	2–8	Forbes Field	14,460
11	December 5	Chicago Bears	**L** 7–29	2–9	Comiskey Park	33,594
12	December 12	at **Washington Redskins**	**L** 20–37	2–10	Griffith Stadium	18,107
Note: Intra-conference opponents are in **bold** text.

== Standings ==
NFL Eastern Conference
	W	L	T	PCT	CONF	PF	PA	STK
Cleveland Browns	9	3	0	.750	8–2	336	162	L1
Philadelphia Eagles	7	4	1	.636	7–3	284	230	W1
New York Giants	7	5	0	.583	7–3	293	184	L1
Pittsburgh Steelers	5	7	0	.417	4–6	219	263	L2
Washington Redskins	3	9	0	.250	2–8	207	432	W1
Chicago Cardinals	2	10	0	.167	2–8	183	347	L3

Note: Tie games were not officially counted in the standings until 1972.

== Personnel ==
=== Staff / Coaches ===
1954 Chicago Cardinals staff
Front office: Principal Owner - Violet Bidwill Wolfner; Managing Director - Walter Wolfner; Head coaches: Head Coach – Joe Stydahar; Offensive coaches: Backfield Coach - Joe Muha; Ends Coach - Bob Nowaskey; Line Coach - Ernie Jorge	Defensive coaches

=== Roster ===
Official team photo of the 1954 Chicago Cardinals.

1954 Chicago Cardinals roster
Quarterbacks (QB): 8 Lamar McHan; 12 Steve Romanik; Running backs (RB): 44 Paul Barry; 40 Bill Bredde CB; 20 Les Goble S; 37 Emmett King; 33 Ollie Matson CB; 36 Johnny Olszewski; 2 Charley Trippi P/S; Wide receivers (WR): 86 Jack Crittendon; 87 Jim Ladd; 80 Don Stonesifer; Tight ends (TE)	Offensive linemen (OL): 65 Johnny Hatley G/T; 70 Jack Jennings T; 68 Bill Lange G; 60 Gordon Polofsky G; 50 Jack Simmons C; 74 Len Teeuws T; 64 Jerry Watford G; Defensive linemen (DL): 82 Tom Bienemann DE; 73 Ledio Fanucchi DT/MG; 75 Dick Fugler MG/DT; 57 Jerry Groom DT/MG; 84 Leo Sugar DE; 85 Pat Summerall DE/K; 72 Chuck Ulrich DT	Linebackers (LB): 51 Leo Sanford; 61 Fred Wallner; Defensive backs (DB): 41 George Brancato CB/RB; 24 Al Brosky S; 47 George Kinek S; 21 Ellsworth Kingery CB; 81 Night Train Lane CB/WR; Special teams (ST)	Reserve: -- Alex Burl RB (Military); -- Tony Curcillo LB/FB (Military); -- Ed Husmann G (Military); -- Gern Nagler WR (Military); 21 Charles Oakley CB (IR); 21 Jim Sears S (IR); -- Dave Suminski G (Military); -- Ralph Thomas DE (Military); Rookies in italics
