= Don King (defensive lineman) =

American football player (1929–2014)

No. 79, 61, 71, 70
- Positions: Defensive tackle, defensive end

Personal information
- Born: March 11, 1929; McBee, South Carolina, U.S.
- Died: April 15, 2014 (aged 85); Savannah, Georgia, U.S.
- Listed height: 6 ft 3 in (1.91 m)
- Listed weight: 260 lb (118 kg)

Career information
- High school: Turtle Creek (Turtle Creek, Pennsylvania)
- College: Kentucky
- NFL draft: 1954: undrafted

Career history

Playing
- Cleveland Browns (1954); Ottawa Rough Riders (1955); Green Bay Packers (1956); Philadelphia Eagles (1956–1957); Denver Broncos (1960); Boston Patriots (1961)*
- * Offseason or practice squad member only

Coaching
- Savannah Indians (semi-pro)

Awards and highlights
- NFL champion (1954)

Career NFL/AFL statistics
- Fumble recoveries: 3
- Interceptions: 2
- Sacks: 2
- Stats at Pro Football Reference

Donald William King (March 11, 1929 – April 15, 2014) was a gridiron football player in the National Football League (NFL), Canadian Football League (CFL), and American Football League (AFL). A defensive tackle, between 1954 and 1960 he played for the Cleveland Browns, Ottawa Rough Riders, Green Bay Packers, Philadelphia Eagles, and Denver Broncos.

Born in South Carolina and raised in Pennsylvania, King played college football at the University of Kentucky before enlisting with the United States Marine Corps. He was discharged from service in 1954 and began his NFL career, signing with the Browns for a season. He then moved to the CFL and played a season with the Rough Riders. In 1956 he went back to the NFL, playing for the Packers and Eagles. King was released from the Eagles in 1957, and spent the next two years out of football before joining the expansion Broncos of the AFL. After a full season with the team, he left professional football and became a semi-pro football coach and a Deputy U. S. Marshall. He died in 2014.

== Early life ==
King was born on March 11, 1929, in McBee, South Carolina, but grew up in Turtle Creek, Pennsylvania. After graduating from high school, he played college football at the University of Kentucky. In his freshman season for the Wildcats, the Press & Sun-Bulletin noted that he was considered a good football prospect. After playing for the Wildcats for two years, the team's plan was for him to start on the defensive line opposite Bob Gain entering 1950. However, before the season began, King joined the armed forces, and served in the United States Marine Corps. He was stationed in Parris Island, South Carolina, and played for the Marines' football team.

== Professional career ==
After being discharged from military service in July 1954, King signed with the Cleveland Browns for the 1954 NFL season. He made the roster as a result of playing football during his military service; his weight had increased to 260 pounds and his strength on the defensive line had increased as well. He played in nine games for the Browns during the season, and had a fumble recovery on October 10 against the Chicago Cardinals. Despite playing in nine games, King saw minimal playing time due to a combination of the Browns' starting linemen performing well and Bob Gain returning from military service of his own in December.

King signed with the Ottawa Rough Riders of the CFL after the 1954 season ended. He played for part of the 1955 season, but due to injuries during his time with the team, he was let go in October. After his release, King applied for reinstatement to the NFL, which was granted, and he rejoined the Browns. His reunion was short-lived; in April 1956, the Browns traded King and Gene Donaldson to the Green Bay Packers for two draft picks. King spent the preseason battling for the starting defensive tackle position opposite Dave Hanner with the previous season's starter Jerry Helluin, and ended up being the starter during some of the preseason games. Helluin ultimately won the job, while King saw limited playing time in six games before his release in early November.

Later in the month, the Philadelphia Eagles signed King to a contract. His first appearance as an Eagle was against his former team, the Cleveland Browns. In that game, King had two fumble recoveries in a 17–14 Eagles loss. In the final game of the 1956 season against the New York Giants, King and Dick Yelvington were ejected from the game for fighting. The Eagles re-signed King for the 1957 season. The Eagles planned for King, now at 270 pounds, to see some playing time both on the offensive and defensive line, and played both positions during the preseason. At the end of preseason, the Eagles acquired Bob Gaona through a trade with the Pittsburgh Steelers. This spelled the end of King's tenure with the Eagles, as he was released to make room for a roster spot.

In January 1960, King was signed by the Denver Broncos of the AFL after two years out of professional football. By the end of preseason, he was named one of the starters on the defensive line, alongside Bud McFadin and Johnny Hatley. The starting position was short-lived, as King only started in two games. He finished the season having played in all 14 games, and had two sacks and two interceptions, including one in the second quarter of a 41–33 loss to the San Diego Chargers, which led to the Broncos having the lead for a short time. In April 1961, King and Al Romine were traded from the Broncos to the Boston Patriots for Art Hauser and Bill Striegel. After spending the preseason fighting for a roster spot, King was released in August from the Patriots, ending his professional career.

== Later life ==
King coached the Savannah Indians, a semi-pro football team in Savannah, Georgia, after retiring from professional football. In 1968, his team had a perfect season and he was named Coach of the Year in the Dixie Football League, and in 1969 he had a 15–game winning streak with the team. He also worked as a Deputy U.S. Marshall from 1970 to 1991. He married Emilie in 1952 after meeting her while serving in the Marines; they had one child together. He died in Savannah on April 15, 2014.
