= Ed Kissell =

American football player (1929–2018)

No. 14, 28
- Position: Defensive back

Personal information
- Born: September 29, 1929; Nashua, New Hampshire, U.S.
- Died: April 7, 2018 (aged 88); Bedford, New Hampshire, U.S.
- Listed height: 6 ft 1 in (1.85 m)
- Listed weight: 193 lb (88 kg)

Career information
- High school: Nashua; Marianapolis Academy (CT)
- College: Wake Forest (1950–1951)
- NFL draft: 1952: 30th round, 354th overall pick

Career history
- Pittsburgh Steelers (1952–1954)

Career NFL statistics
- Interceptions: 6
- Stats at Pro Football Reference

Edward John Julius Kissell (September 29, 1929 – April 7, 2018) was an American professional football player who was a defensive back for four seasons for the Pittsburgh Steelers

Three of his brothers, Adolph Kissell, John Kissell and Veto Kissell, also played professional football.
