= NWA United States Television Championship =

Details
- Promotion: Capitol Wrestling Corporation (CWC); National Wrestling Alliance (NWA)
- Date established: 1957 / 1958
- Date retired: July 25, 1962
Statistics
- First champion: Johnny Valentine
- Final champion: Johnny Valentine
- Most reigns: Johnny Valentine (5 reigns)

The NWA United States Television Championship was a professional wrestling television championship owned and promoted by the Capitol Wrestling Corporation (CWC), the predecessor of WWE. The championship was either introduced in 1957 or 1958, making it the first singles championship introduced overall by the CWC and what is now WWE.

== Reigns ==
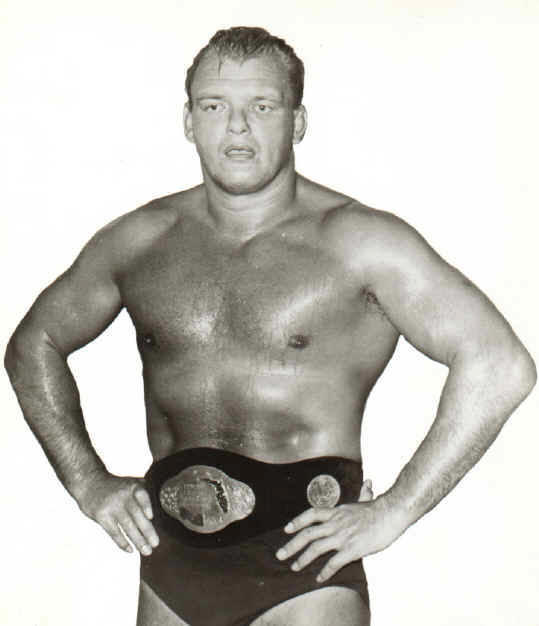
Inaugural record five-time champion, as well as the last titleholder, Johnny Valentine

Over the championship's five-year history, there have been nine reigns between five champions. Johnny Valentine was the inaugural champion, and also held the record for most reigns at five times. Valentine was also the last champion, after CWC abandoned the title.

Key
No.	Overall reign number
Reign	Reign number for the specific champion
Days	Number of days held

No.	Champion	Championship change			Reign statistics		Notes	Ref.
No.	Champion	Date	Event	Location	Reign	Days	Notes	Ref.
National Wrestling Alliance: Capitol Wrestling Corporation (CWC)
1	Johnny Valentine	1957 / 1958	House show	N/A (Note: The location of the championship change is either uncertain or has not been found documented.)	1	N/A (Note: The length of Johnny Valentine's 1st title reign is too uncertain to calculate.)	It is uncertain who Valentine defeated to become the inaugural champion. Sources suggested that Valentine won the title during a tournament in 1957, or by defeating Verne Gagne in 1958 in Chicago, IL.	
2	Don Joyce	March 10, 1959	House show	Baltimore, MD	1	28		
3	Johnny Valentine	April 7, 1959	House show	Baltimore, MD	2	458		
4	Don Curtis	July 8, 1960 (NLT)	House show	N/A	1	N/A (Note: The length of Don Curtis' title reign is too uncertain to calculate.)	Curtis won the championship sometime after May 29.	
5	Johnny Valentine	July 1960	House show	N/A	3	15–45 (Note: The exact date that Valentine won the championship is uncertain, meaning that his reign lasted between 15 and 45 days.)		
6	Kurt Von Heidleberg	August 15, 1960	House show	Richmond, VA	1	38		
7	Johnny Valentine	September 22, 1960 (NLT)	House show	N/A	4	N/A (Note: The length of Johnny Valentine's 4th title reign is too uncertain to calculate.)		
8	Crusher Lisowski	August 24, 1961 (NLT)	House show	Philadelphia, PA	1	N/A (Note: The length of The Lisowski's title reign is too uncertain to calculate.)		
9	Johnny Valentine	September 28, 1961 (NLT)	House show	N/A	5	N/A (Note: The length of Valentine's 5th title reign is too uncertain to calculate.)		
—	Deactivated	July 25, 1962	—	—	—	—	Johnny Valentine was the final champion after the CWC abandoned the title on July 25, 1962 without a formal announcement.	
