= Bill Lange (offensive guard) =

American football player (1928–1995)

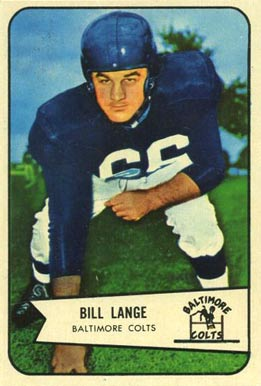
- Lange on a 1954 Bowman football card

No. 26, 65, 66, 68
- Position: Offensive guard

Personal information
- Born: January 12, 1928; Delphos, Ohio, U.S.
- Died: April 7, 1995 (aged 67); Bellefontaine, Ohio, U.S.
- Listed height: 6 ft 1 in (1.85 m)
- Listed weight: 239 lb (108 kg)

Career information
- High school: St. Rose (Lima, Ohio)
- College: Dayton (1946–1949)
- NFL draft: 1950: 30th round, 389th overall pick

Career history
- Los Angeles Rams (1950–1952); Baltimore Colts (1953); Chicago Cardinals (1954–1955)

Awards and highlights
- NFL champion (1951); Second-team All-Pro (1953)

Career NFL statistics
- Games played: 56
- Games started: 45
- Stats at Pro Football Reference

William Henry Lange (January 12, 1928 – April 7, 1995) was an American professional football offensive guard who played five seasons in the National Football League (NFL) with the Los Angeles Rams, Baltimore Colts and Chicago Cardinals. He was selected by the Rams in the 30th round of the 1950 NFL draft after playing college football at the University of Dayton.

== Early life and college ==
William Henry Lange was born on January 12, 1928, in Delphos, Ohio. He attended St. Rose High School in Lima, Ohio.

He was a member of the Dayton Flyers of the University of Dayton from 1946 to 1949 and a three-year letterman from 1947 to 1949.

== Professional career ==
Lange was selected by the Los Angeles Rams in the 30th round, with the 389th overall pick, of the 1950 NFL draft. He signed with the Rams in 1950 but spent the entire season on injured reserve. He played in all 12 games, starting ten, for the Rams in 1951. He also started for the Rams in the 1951 NFL Championship Game, a 24–17 victory over the Cleveland Browns. He appeared in ten games, starting seven, during the 1952 season.

Lange was traded to the Baltimore Colts in 1953. He played in all 12 games, starting ten, for the Colts during the team's inaugural 1953 season, earning New York Daily News second-team All-Pro honors. The team finished with a 3–9 record.

On September 20, 1954, Lange and a draft pick were traded to the Chicago Cardinals for Don Joyce. Lange appeared in ten games, starting six, for the Cardinals in 1954. He started all 12 games during the 1955 season as the Cardinals finished with a 4–7–1 record. He became a free agent after the season.

== Personal life ==
Lange died on April 15, 1995, in Bellefontaine, Ohio.
