= Paul Held =

American football player (1927–2019)

No. 17, 15
- Position: Quarterback

Personal information
- Born: October 20, 1928; El Segundo, California, U.S.
- Died: July 19, 2019 (aged 90); La Quinta, California, U.S.
- Listed height: 6 ft 2 in (1.88 m)
- Listed weight: 195 lb (88 kg)

Career information
- High school: Redondo Union (Redondo Beach, California)
- College: San Jose State
- NFL draft: 1953: 19th round, 230th overall pick

Career history
- Pittsburgh Steelers (1954); Green Bay Packers (1955)

Career NFL statistics
- Passing attempts: 77
- Passing completions: 26
- Completion percentage: 33.8%
- TD–INT: 1–6
- Passing yards: 332
- Passer rating: 20
- Stats at Pro Football Reference

Paul Ernest Held Jr. (October 20, 1927 – July 19, 2019) was an American professional football player who was a quarterback in the National Football League (NFL). He played college football for the San Jose State Spartans.

== Biography ==
Held was born in El Segundo, California, and attended San Jose State University. He was selected in the 19th round of the 1953 NFL draft by the Detroit Lions and later played with the Pittsburgh Steelers and Green Bay Packers.
