= Frank Cassara =

American football player (1928–2017)

No. 32
- Positions: Fullback, linebacker

Personal information
- Born: March 22, 1928; San Fernando, California
- Died: January 11, 2017 (aged 88)
- Listed height: 6 ft 0 in (1.83 m)
- Listed weight: 215 lb (98 kg)

Career information
- High school: Pacoima (CA) San Fernando
- College: Saint Mary's (California)

Career history
- San Francisco 49ers (1954)
- Stats at Pro Football Reference

Frank Cassara (March 22, 1928 – January 11, 2017) was an American football fullback who played for the San Francisco 49ers.

Cassara was born in San Fernando, California and attended San Fernando High School in Pacoima. He played college football at Saint Mary's College of California, graduating in 1951; he was team captain in his senior year. He was inducted into the Athletic Hall of Fame at Saint Mary's in 1997.

After serving in the United States Coast Guard, he played 6 games as a fullback for the San Francisco 49ers in 1954, 3 as a starter, before being released the same year.
