= Adolph Kissell =

American football player (1920–1983)

No. 18
- Position: Halfback

Personal information
- Born: September 11, 1920; Nashua, New Hampshire, U.S.
- Died: August 7, 1983 (aged 62); Wareham, Massachusetts, U.S.
- Listed height: 5 ft 11 in (1.80 m)
- Listed weight: 190 lb (86 kg)

Career information
- High school: Nashua
- College: Boston College (1938–1941)
- NFL draft: 1942: 21st round, 195th overall pick

Career history
- Chicago Bears (1942)

Career NFL statistics
- Return yards: 63
- Stats at Pro Football Reference

Adolph Kissell (September 11, 1920 – August 7, 1983) was an American football halfback. He played for the Chicago Bears in 1942.

Three of his brothers, Ed Kissell, John Kissell and Veto Kissell, also played professional football.
