= John Kissell =

American gridiron football player (1923–1992)

- Kissell while with the Cleveland Browns

No. 47, 45, 70, 72, 68
- Positions: Defensive tackle, tackle

Personal information
- Born: May 14, 1923; Nashua, New Hampshire, U.S.
- Died: April 9, 1992 (aged 68); Nashua, New Hampshire, U.S.
- Listed height: 6 ft 4 in (1.93 m)
- Listed weight: 245 lb (111 kg)

Career information
- High school: Nashua; La Salle Military Academy (Oakdale, New York)
- College: Boston College (1942, 1946-1947)
- NFL draft: 1947: 14th round, 123rd overall pick

Career history
- Buffalo Bills (1948-1949); Cleveland Browns (1950–1952); Ottawa Rough Riders (1953); Cleveland Browns (1954–1956); Kitchener-Waterloo Dutchmen (1959)

Awards and highlights
- 3× NFL champion (1950, 1954, 1955); Second-team All-Pro (1951)

Career NFL/AAFC statistics
- Games played: 98
- Games started: 65
- Fumble recoveries: 9
- Stats at Pro Football Reference

John Jay "Big John" Kissell (May 14, 1923 – April 9, 1992) was an American football defensive tackle who played for the Buffalo Bills in the All-America Football Conference (AAFC) and the Cleveland Browns in the National Football League (NFL) in the 1940s and 1950s. He played college football at Boston College.

Kissell grew up in Nashua, New Hampshire, and attended Boston College on an athletic scholarship. He played there for the 1942 season, when the school's football team made the Orange Bowl but lost to Alabama. He then entered the U.S. Army during World War II, serving in Europe, Africa and the Middle East for three years. He returned to college after the war and played football for two more seasons.

Kissell signed with the Bills in 1948 and played there for two years before the AAFC dissolved and the team disbanded. He was then sent to the Browns in a deal orchestrated by coach Paul Brown to acquire former Buffalo players. He played in Cleveland through 1956, interrupted by one year with the Ottawa Rough Riders of the Canadian Football League. He was part of a defensive line that featured Len Ford, Don Colo and Bob Gain, who helped the Browns win NFL championships in 1950, 1954, and 1955. Kissell spent two years away from football after leaving the Browns, returning to play for the Kitchener-Waterloo Dutchmen in Canada for the 1959 season. He then retired from playing and became a junior high school teacher back in Nashua. He died of cancer in 1992.

== Early life and college ==
Kissell grew up in Nashua, New Hampshire and attended Nashua High School, where he played basketball, track and football in the late 1930s under head coach Pete Chesnulevich. He was named an all-New Hampshire tackle in two of his years at Nashua. He later attended La Salle Military Academy, a private Roman Catholic high school in Oakdale, New York.

After graduating, Kissell enrolled at Boston College on an athletic scholarship. He was on a Boston College Eagles football team that finished the 1942 season with an 8–2 win–loss record under head coach Denny Myers and lost to Alabama in the Orange Bowl. Kissell then entered the U.S. Army as American involvement in World War II intensified. He was a private stationed at first at Fort Hood in Texas, and played for the base's service football team before being sent to Europe. He spent time at the Ecole Spéciale Militaire de Saint-Cyr in Fontainebleau outside of Paris in 1945, and also served in Africa and the Middle East. Kissell returned to Boston after the war and played as a defensive lineman in the 1946 and 1947 seasons.

== Professional career ==
Kissell was selected 123rd overall by the National Football League's Los Angeles Rams in the 12th round of the 1947 draft, but instead joined the Buffalo Bills of the rival All-America Football Conference (AAFC) in 1948. Buffalo finished the regular season 7–7 in a tie with the Baltimore Colts for first place in the AAFC East. After beating the Colts in a playoff, the Bills lost the AAFC championship game to the Cleveland Browns. The Bills finished 5–5–2 the following season, losing again to the Browns in a playoff. Kissell was named an All-Pro defensive tackle by the International News Service after the season. The AAFC disbanded at the end of 1949 because of financial struggles stemming from poor attendance and competition over player salaries, and three of its teams – the Browns, Colts and San Francisco 49ers – were absorbed by the NFL.

In 1950, players from the AAFC's defunct teams – including the Bills – went into a dispersal draft. Kissell, however, was sold along with halfback Rex Bumgardner and guard (American football) Abe Gibron to the Browns in a deal that gave Bills owner James Breuil a 25% share in the team. In the Browns, Kissell joined a team that had won all of the AAFC's four championships behind an offense that featured quarterback Otto Graham, fullback Marion Motley and ends Mac Speedie and Dante Lavelli. Yet while the Browns had been the league's best team, many sportswriters and owners doubted that the team would continue its string of success in the NFL starting in 1950. Cleveland began the season by beating the previous year's NFL champion Philadelphia Eagles and went on to win the NFL championship over the Los Angeles Rams. Kissell finished his education at Boston College in 1950, graduating with a bachelor's degree in education and government.

With the Browns, Kissell had a reputation as a mean and exceptionally strong defender playing beside defensive end Len Ford and linebacker Bill Willis under head coach Paul Brown. He was "a little bit rowdy", teammate John Sandusky later recalled, and once hit a blocking sled in practice so hard that he broke it. Cleveland finished the 1951 season with an 11–1 record and again reached the championship game, but lost this time to the Rams. Sportswriters named Kissell a second-team All-Pro after the season.

The Browns again contended for the NFL championship in 1952 but lost to the Detroit Lions. After that season, Kissell decided to jump to the Canadian Football League, signing with the Ottawa Rough Riders for $9,500 a year plus bonuses – $2,000 more than he was making with the Browns. He joined numerous other NFL players, including teammate Mac Speedie, in a player exodus to the CFL, which was trying to build its talent pool by offering better salaries to American players. The move, however, prompted a drawn-out legal case between the Browns and the Rough Riders in the Canadian courts at the beginning of the 1953 season. Kissell was allowed to stay in the Canadian league as the proceedings continued, and the Rough Riders finished the season with a 7–7 record, falling short of an appearance in the league playoffs. The Browns and Rough Riders settled their differences the following April, agreeing to send Kissell back to Cleveland. Kissell said he had "made a mistake" by going to the Canadian league and thanked Brown for giving him a second chance.

The Browns won two more championships in 1954 and 1955 while Kissell was with the team. He recovered a fumble in the 1954 championship game against the Lions and was part of a defensive front with Ford, Don Colo and Bob Gain that kept the Rams' offense off balance in the 1955 championship game. His last season in Cleveland was in 1956, when the team had its first-ever losing record.

Kissell took two years off of football before signing in the summer of 1959 to play for the Kitchener-Waterloo Dutchmen, a Canadian team. Bob Jauron, a coach from Nashua, had been hired to lead the team, which played in the Ontario Rugby Football Union. He played there for one year.

== Later life and death ==
After his professional career, Kissell went back to New Hampshire and was the recreation director at Spring Street Junior High School in Nashua, later serving as a teacher there until 1985. In 1964, he took a job as line coach for the short-lived Nashua Colts, a team in the semi-pro Eastern Football League. The Colts won the league championship in 1966. Kissell died of cancer in 1992. He had two children. Three of his brothers, Adolph Kissell, Veto Kissell and Ed Kissell, also played professional football.
