= 1954 Baltimore Colts season =

2nd season in franchise history

- Owner: Carroll Rosenbloom
- General manager: Don "Red" Kellett
- Head coach: Weeb Ewbank
- Home stadium: Memorial Stadium

Results
- Record: 3–9
- Division place: 6th NFL Western
- Playoffs: Did not qualify

The 1954 Baltimore Colts season was the second season for the team in the National Football League. The Baltimore Colts finished the National Football League's 1954 season with a record of 3 wins and 9 losses and finished sixth in the Western Conference. This was the first season that Colts wore horseshoes on their helmets. From 1954 to 1955, the horseshoes were white and on the back of an otherwise-solid blue helmet. Then, the horseshoe and helmet traded colors in 1956. The Colts did not start wearing white helmets with a single blue stripe going down the middle and a blue horseshoe on either side of it until 1957, which they presently don.

Program for the Colts' December 4 game in Los Angeles against the Rams.

== Regular season ==
=== Schedule ===
Game	Date	Opponent	Result	Record	Venue	Attendance	Recap	Sources
1	September 26	**Los Angeles Rams**	**L** 0–48	0–1	Memorial Stadium	36,215	Recap	
2	October 2	**New York Giants**	**W** 20–14	1–1	Memorial Stadium	27,088	Recap	
3	October 10	at **Chicago Bears**	**L** 9–28	1–2	Wrigley Field	27,845	Recap	
4	October 16	at **Detroit Lions**	**L** 0–35	1–3	Briggs Stadium	48,272	Recap	
5	October 24	**Green Bay Packers**	**L** 6–7	1–4	Memorial Stadium	28,680	Recap	
6	October 31	at Washington Redskins	**L** 21–24	1–5	Griffith Stadium	23,566	Recap	
7	November 6	**Detroit Lions**	**L** 3–27	1–6	Memorial Stadium	25,287	Recap	
8	November 13	at **Green Bay Packers**	**L** 13–24	1–7	Milwaukee County Stadium	19,786	Recap	
9	November 21	**Chicago Bears**	**L** 13–28	1–8	Memorial Stadium	23,093	Recap	
10	November 28	**San Francisco 49ers**	**W** 17–13	2–8	Memorial Stadium	23,875	Recap	
11	December 4	at **Los Angeles Rams**	**W** 22–21	3–8	L.A. Memorial Coliseum	30,744	Recap	
12	December 11	at **San Francisco 49ers**	**L** 7–10	3–9	Kezar Stadium	26,856	Recap	
Note: Intra-conference opponents are in **bold** text.

=== Standings ===
NFL Western Conference
	W	L	T	PCT	CONF	PF	PA	STK
Detroit Lions	9	2	1	.818	8–2	337	189	W1
Chicago Bears	8	4	0	.667	7–3	301	279	W4
San Francisco 49ers	7	4	1	.636	5–4–1	313	251	W2
Los Angeles Rams	6	5	1	.545	4–5–1	314	285	W1
Green Bay Packers	4	8	0	.333	3–7	234	251	L4
Baltimore Colts	3	9	0	.250	2–8	131	279	L1

Note: Tie games were not officially counted in the standings until 1972.

== Roster ==
Official team photo of the 1954 Baltimore Colts.

1954 Baltimore Colts roster
Quarterbacks: 19 Cotton Davidson P; 18 Gary Kerkorian K; Running backs: 20 George Taliaferro; 36 Zollie Toth; 26 Royce Womble; 21 Buddy Young; Receivers: 80 Jack Bighead; 87 Lloyd Colteryahn; 82 Dan Edwards	Offensive linemen: 61 Dick Barwegen G/T/LB; 74 Ken Jackson T; 72 Jack Little T; 50 Buzz Nutter C; 52 George Radosevich C; 68 Alex Sandusky G; 63 Art Spinney G; Defensive linemen: 73 Joe Campanella MG; 66 Ernie Cheatham DT; 70 Art Donovan DT; 77 Tom Finnin DT/T; 76 Don Joyce DE/DT; 83 Bob Langas DE; 75 Gino Marchetti DE; 84 Jim Mutscheller DE	Linebackers: 67 Doug Eggers; 65 Bill Pellington; Defensive backs: 21 Tom Keane S; 31 Jimmy Lesane S; 40 Bob Leberman S/CB; 44 Bert Rechichar S/K; 25 Don Shula CB; 23 Carl Taseff CB/RB	Reserve list: 86 Monte Brethauer WR (Military); -- Joe D'Agostino MG (IR); 38 John Huzvar RB (Retired); -- Buck McPhail RB (Military); 31 Chuck McMillan S (Military); rookies in italics

== See also ==
- History of the Indianapolis Colts
