= Don Johnson (American football, born 1931) =

No. 40
- Position: Running back

Personal information
- Born: October 31, 1931; Bakersfield, California, U.S.
- Died: February 27, 2021 (aged 89); Bakersfield, California, U.S.
- Listed height: 6 ft 0 in (1.83 m)
- Listed weight: 189 lb (86 kg)

Career information
- High school: Bakersfield (Bakersfield, California)
- College: Bakersfield CC (1949–1950); California (1951–1952)
- NFL draft: 1953: 3rd round, 34th overall pick

Career history
- Philadelphia Eagles (1953–1955)

Career NFL statistics
- Rushing yards: 456
- Touchdowns: 7

Donald Lee Johnson (October 31, 1931 – February 27, 2021) was an American professional football running back. He played three seasons for the Philadelphia Eagles of the National Football League (NFL). From Bakersfield, California, he played college football for the Bakersfield Renegades and California Golden Bears. Johnson was selected by the Eagles in the third round of the 1953 NFL draft and led the team in rushing in his first year.
