= Dick Yelvington =

American football player (1928–2013)

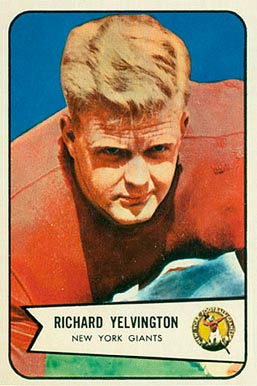
- Yelvington on a 1954 Bowman football card

No. 72
- Positions: Tackle, guard

Personal information
- Born: July 27, 1928; Mims, Florida, U.S.
- Died: February 24, 2013 (aged 84); Lake Charles, Louisiana, U.S.
- Listed height: 6 ft 2 in (1.88 m)
- Listed weight: 232 lb (105 kg)

Career information
- High school: Mainland (Daytona Beach, Florida)
- College: Georgia
- NFL draft: 1951: 23rd round, 278th overall pick

Career history
- New York Giants (1952–1957)

Awards and highlights
- NFL champion (1956)

Career NFL statistics
- Games played: 62
- Games started: 61
- Fumble recoveries: 1
- Stats at Pro Football Reference

Richard Joseph Yelvington Jr. (July 27, 1928 – February 24, 2013) was an American professional football offensive lineman. He played six seasons for the New York Giants. Yelvington played college football at Georgia, and served one year with the United States Army during the Korean War before starting his NFL career. In the final regular season game of the 1956 season against the New York Giants, Yelvington and Don King were ejected from the game for fighting.
