= Veto Kissell =

American football player (1927–1997)

No. 71, 72
- Positions: Linebacker, fullback

Personal information
- Born: June 13, 1927; Nashua, New Hampshire, U.S.
- Died: March 19, 1997 (aged 69); Morris Plains, New Jersey, U.S.
- Listed height: 5 ft 10 in (1.78 m)
- Listed weight: 205 lb (93 kg)

Career information
- High school: Nashua
- College: Holy Cross (1946–1948)
- NFL draft: 1949: 17th round, 165th overall pick

Career history
- Buffalo Bills (1949); Baltimore Colts (1950)

Career NFL/AAFC statistics
- Rushing yards: 25
- Rushing average: 2.1
- Receptions: 3
- Receiving yards: 37
- Interceptions: 3
- Stats at Pro Football Reference

Veto Kissell (June 13, 1927 – March 19, 1997) was an American professional football linebacker and fullback. He played for the Buffalo Bills in 1949 and for the Baltimore Colts in 1950.

Three of his brothers, Adolph Kissell, Ed Kissell and John Kissell, also played professional football.
