= Gus Cifelli =

American football player (1926–2009)

No. 70, 73, 77
- Position: Offensive tackle

Personal information
- Born: February 3, 1926; Philadelphia, Pennsylvania, U.S.
- Died: March 26, 2009 (aged 83); Royal Oak, Michigan, U.S.
- Listed height: 6 ft 4 in (1.93 m)
- Listed weight: 244 lb (111 kg)

Career information
- High school: La Salle College (Wyndmoor, Pennsylvania)
- College: Nevada; Notre Dame
- NFL draft: 1950: 19th round, 239th overall pick

Career history
- Detroit Lions (1950–1952); Green Bay Packers (1953); Philadelphia Eagles (1954); Pittsburgh Steelers (1954)

Awards and highlights
- NFL champion (1952); 3× National champion (1946, 1947, 1949)

Career NFL statistics
- Games played: 60
- Games started: 44
- Fumble recoveries: 2
- Stats at Pro Football Reference

August Blase Cifelli (February 3, 1926 – March 26, 2009) was an American professional football offensive tackle who played for three College Football National Championship teams with the Notre Dame Fighting Irish football team and won the 1952 NFL championship with the Detroit Lions. After retiring from football, he went to law school and was elected as a Michigan district court judge, where he served for more than two decades.

== Biography ==
He was born on February 3, 1926, in Philadelphia and attended La Salle College High School. He served in the United States Marine Corps during World War II, and was awarded the Purple Heart for his service in the Pacific Theater. He attended the University of Notre Dame after completing military service, where he majored in philosophy. He was a part of three national championship teams at Notre Dame, graduating from the school in 1950.

=== Football ===
He was selected by the Detroit Lions in the 19th round of the 1950 NFL draft, as the 239th pick overall, and played for the Lions from 1950 to 1952. He also played for the Green Bay Packers in the 1953 season, and split time between the Philadelphia Eagles and Pittsburgh Steelers in the 1954 season.

Cifelli was one of the former players who participated in the May 1967 old-timers game against the 1967 Notre Dame football team. While the bulk of the "old-timers" were graduates from the previous year, Cifelli was joined by Heisman Trophy winners Johnny Lattner and Leon Hart. The game was broadcast on ABC and played in front of 20,000 fans at Notre Dame Stadium.

=== Legal career ===
After retiring from football, he earned a law degree at the University of Detroit Mercy School of Law. He was elected to serve as a judge of the 48th District Court in Bloomfield Hills, Michigan, and served in that role from his election in 1973 until he resigned from his seat in 2000. For 10 years, he served as the court's chief judge.

=== Personal life ===
Cifelli died at age 83 on March 26, 2009, at William Beaumont Hospital in Royal Oak, Michigan, due to natural causes.
