= Andy Miketa =

American football player (1929–2010)

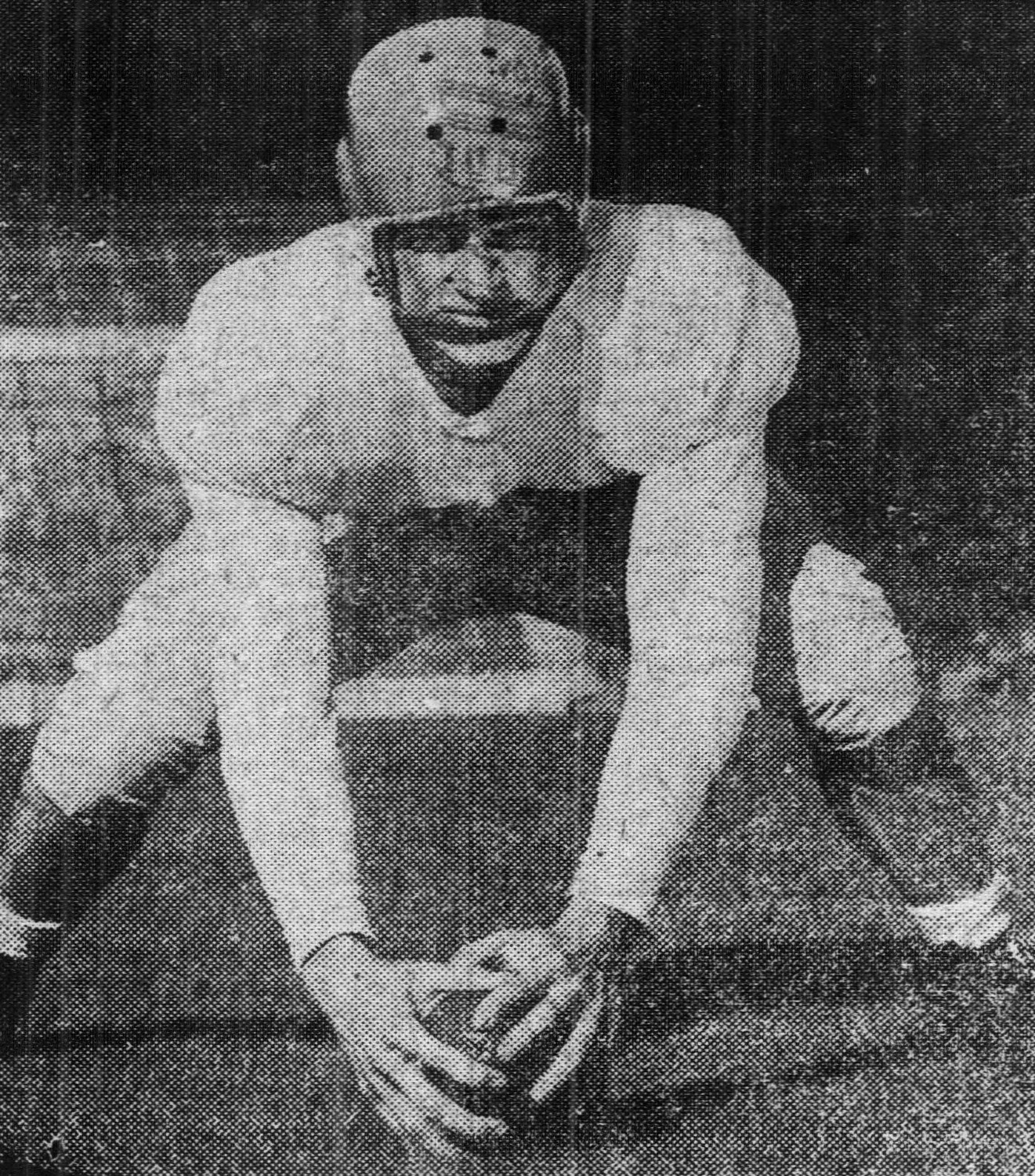

Profile
- Position: Center

Personal information
- Born: November 1, 1929; Girard, Ohio, U.S.
- Died: April 10, 2010 (aged 80); Grand Rapids, Michigan, U.S.
- Listed height: 6 ft 2 in (1.88 m)
- Listed weight: 210 lb (95 kg)

Career information
- College: North Carolina

Career history
- Detroit Lions (1954–1955)

Career statistics
- Games started: 24
- Games played: 17
- Stats at Pro Football Reference

Andrew John Miketa (/mɪˈkiːtə/ mih-KEE-tə; November 1, 1929 – April 10, 2010) was an American professional football center who played in the National Football League (NFL) for the Detroit Lions from 1954 to 1955.
