= 1954 Chicago Bears season =

NFL team season

- Head coach: George Halas
- Home stadium: Wrigley Field

Results
- Record: 8–4
- Division place: 2nd NFL Western
- Playoffs: Did not qualify

The 1954 season was the Chicago Bears' 35th in the National Football League. The team improved on their 3–8–1 record from 1953 and finished at 8–4 under head coach and owner George Halas, runner-up in the Western Conference.

== Regular season ==
=== Schedule ===
Cover of the program for the December 12 season finale against the Detroit Lions.

Game	Date	Opponent	Result	Record	Venue	Attendance	Recap	Sources
1	September 26	at **Detroit Lions**	**L** 23–48	0–1	Briggs Stadium	52,343	Recap	
2	October 3	at **Green Bay Packers**	**W** 10–3	1–1	City Stadium	24,414	Recap	
3	October 10	**Baltimore Colts**	**W** 28–9	2–1	Wrigley Field	27,845	Recap	
4	October 17	**San Francisco 49ers**	**L** 24–31	2–2	Wrigley Field	42,935	Recap	
5	October 24	at **Los Angeles Rams**	**L** 38–42	2–3	L.A. Memorial Coliseum	48,204	Recap	
6	October 31	at **San Francisco 49ers**	**W** 31–27	3–3	Kezar Stadium	49,833	Recap	
7	November 7	**Green Bay Packers**	**W** 28–23	4–3	Wrigley Field	47,038	Recap	
8	November 14	Cleveland Browns	**L** 10–39	4–4	Wrigley Field	48,773	Recap	
9	November 21	at **Baltimore Colts**	**W** 28–13	5–4	Memorial Stadium	23,093	Recap	
10	November 28	**Los Angeles Rams**	**W** 24–13	6–4	Wrigley Field	32,338	Recap	
11	December 5	at Chicago Cardinals	**W** 29–7	7–4	Comiskey Park	33,594	Recap	
12	December 12	**Detroit Lions**	**W** 28–24	8–4	Wrigley Field	37,240	Recap	
Note: Intra-conference opponents are in **bold** text.

=== Standings ===
NFL Western Conference
	W	L	T	PCT	CONF	PF	PA	STK
Detroit Lions	9	2	1	.818	8–2	337	189	W1
Chicago Bears	8	4	0	.667	7–3	301	279	W4
San Francisco 49ers	7	4	1	.636	5–4–1	313	251	W2
Los Angeles Rams	6	5	1	.545	4–5–1	314	285	W1
Green Bay Packers	4	8	0	.333	3–7	234	251	L4
Baltimore Colts	3	9	0	.250	2–8	131	279	L1

Note: Tie games were not officially counted in the standings until 1972.

== Roster ==
Chicago Bears 1954 roster
Quarterbacks: 12 Zeke Bratkowski P; 15 Ed Brown P/CB; Running backs: 46 Billy Anderson; 32 Leon Campbell; 89 John Hoffman; 30 Chick Jagade; 39 Pete Perini; 45 Billy Stone; Receivers: 43 Jim Dooley; 87 Harlon Hill; 83 Bill McColl; 88 Gene Schroeder	Offensive linemen: 62 Kline Gilbert G; 78 Stan Jones T; 55 Larry Strickland C; 72 Bill Wightkin T; 75 Fred Williams G; Defensive linemen: 73 Bill Bishop DT/DE; 81 Larry Brink DE; 65 Herman Clark MG; 64 Ted Daffer DE; 61 Bill George MG/LB/K; 58 John Kreamcheck DT; 74 Paul Lipscomb MG/DT; 76 Ed Meadows DT; 7 Ed Sprinkle DE	Linebackers: 51 Wayne Hansen C; 50 Bones Weatherly; Defensive backs: 80 John Helwig CB; 6 Don Kindt CB/RB; 29 McNeil Moore S; 20 Ray Gene Smith CB; 40 Stan Wallace S/CB	Reserve list: -- Don Bingham RB (Military); 16 George Blanda QB/K (IR); 71 George Connor LB (IR); -- Jack Hoffman DE (Military); 10 Tommy O'Connell QB (Military); Rookies in italics
