= 1954 Green Bay Packers season =

NFL team season

- General manager: Verne Lewellen
- Head coach: Lisle Blackbourn
- Home stadium: City Stadium; Milwaukee County Stadium

Results
- Record: 4–8
- Division place: 5th NFL Western
- Playoffs: Did not qualify

The 1954 Green Bay Packers season was their 36th season overall and their 34th season in the National Football League. The team finished with a 4–8 record under new head coach Lisle Blackbourn and finished fifth in the Western Conference.

In a season of streaks for the Packers, they lost their first three games, all at home, climbed back to .500 at 4–4, then lost their final four.

Hired in early January, Blackbourn was previously the head coach for four years at Marquette University in Milwaukee.

== Offseason ==
=== NFL draft ===
Round	Pick	Player	Position	School/Club team
1	3	Art Hunter	Offensive tackle	Notre Dame
1	4	Veryl Switzer	Back	Kansas State
2	15	Bob Fleck	Tackle	Syracuse
3	27	George Timberlake	Linebacker	USC
4	40	Tommy Allman	Back	West Virginia
5	51	Max McGee	Wide receiver	Tulane
7	75	Sam Marshall	Tackle	Florida A&M
8	87	Jimmie Williams	Tackle	Texas Tech
9	99	Dave Davis	End	Georgia Tech
10	111	Gene Knutson	Defensive end	Michigan
11	123	Ken Hall	End	North Texas State
12	135	Bill Oliver	Back	Alabama
13	147	Mike Takacs	Guard	Ohio State
14	159	Dave Johnson	Back	Rice
16	183	Des Koch	Back	USC
17	195	J. D. Roberts	Guard	Oklahoma
18	207	Emery Barnes	Defensive end	Oregon
19	219	Ken Hall	Center	Springfield
20	231	Lowell Herbert	Guard	Pacific
21	243	Art Liebscher	Back	Pacific
22	255	Willie Buford	Tackle	Morgan State
23	267	Clint Sathrum	Back	St. Olaf
24	279	Marv Tennefoss	End	Stanford
25	291	John Smalley	Tackle	Alabama
26	303	Ralph Baierl	Tackle	Maryland
27	315	Hosea Sims	End	Marquette
28	327	Evan Slonac	Back	Michigan State
29	339	Jerry Dufek	Tackle	St. Norbert
30	351	Terry Campbell	Back	Washington State

- Yellow indicates a future Pro Bowl selection

== Regular season ==
=== Schedule ===
Week	Date	Opponent	Result	Record	Venue	Attendance
1	September 26	Pittsburgh Steelers	**L** 20–21	0–1	City Stadium	20,675
2	October 3	**Chicago Bears**	**L** 3–10	0–2	City Stadium	24,414
3	October 10	**San Francisco 49ers**	**L** 17–23	0–3	Milwaukee County Stadium	15,571
4	October 17	**Los Angeles Rams**	**W** 35–17	1–3	Milwaukee County Stadium	17,455
5	October 24	at **Baltimore Colts**	**W** 7–6	2–3	Memorial Stadium	28,680
6	October 30	at Philadelphia Eagles	**W** 37–14	3–3	Connie Mack Stadium	25,378
7	November 7	at **Chicago Bears**	**L** 23–28	3–4	Wrigley Field	47,038
8	November 13	**Baltimore Colts**	**W** 24–13	4–4	Milwaukee County Stadium	19,786
9	November 21	**Detroit Lions**	**L** 17–21	4–5	City Stadium	20,767
10	November 25	at **Detroit Lions**	**L** 24–28	4–6	Briggs Stadium	55,532
11	December 5	at **San Francisco 49ers**	**L** 0–35	4–7	Kezar Stadium	32,012
12	December 12	at **Los Angeles Rams**	**L** 27–35	4–8	Los Angeles Memorial Coliseum	38,839
Note: Intra-conference opponents are in **bold** text.

=== Standings ===
NFL Western Conference
	W	L	T	PCT	CONF	PF	PA	STK
Detroit Lions	9	2	1	.818	8–2	337	189	W1
Chicago Bears	8	4	0	.667	7–3	301	279	W4
San Francisco 49ers	7	4	1	.636	5–4–1	313	251	W2
Los Angeles Rams	6	5	1	.545	4–5–1	314	285	W1
Green Bay Packers	4	8	0	.333	3–7	234	251	L4
Baltimore Colts	3	9	0	.250	2–8	131	279	L1

Note: Tie games were not officially counted in the standings until 1972.

== Roster ==
1954 Green Bay Packers final roster
Quarterbacks: 15 Bobby Garrett; 18 Tobin Rote; Running backs: 42 Al Carmichael; 31 Fred Cone K; 37 Howie Ferguson; 40 Joe Johnson; 24 Breezy Reid; 27 Veryl Switzer CB; Receivers: 86 Billy Howton; 84 Gary Knafelc; 85 Max McGee P	Offensive linemen: 75 Dick Afflis T/G; 63 Al Barry G; 62 Buddy Brown G; 70 Art Hunter T; 51 Jim Ringo C; 61 Steve Ruzich G/T/MG/DT; 53 Dave Stephenson C/G; 68 Len Szafaryn T; Defensive linemen: 80 Carlton Elliott DE; 69 Bill Forester MG/LB; 77 Dave Hanner DT; 72 Jerry Helluin DT; 81 Gene Knutson DE; 83 John Martinkovic DE	Linebackers: 66 Deral Teteak; 58 Clayton Tonnemaker; 74 Roger Zatkoff; Defensive backs: 44 Bobby Dillon S; 48 Jim Psaltis CB; 28 Clarence Self S; 47 Val Joe Walker CB; 88 Gene White CB	Reserve list: -- George Timberlake LB (IR); Rookies in italics
