= 1954 Los Angeles Rams season =

NFL team season

- Head coach: Hamp Pool
- Home stadium: Los Angeles Memorial Coliseum

Results
- Record: 6–5–1
- Division place: 4th NFL Western
- Playoffs: Did not qualify

Uniform
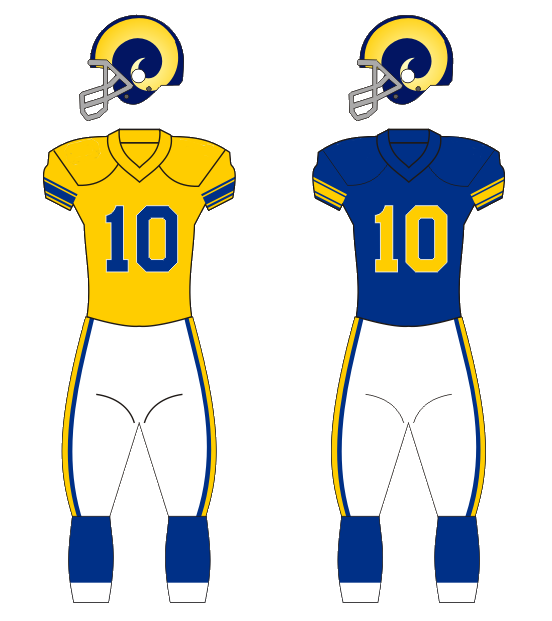

The 1954 Los Angeles Rams season marked the 17th year of the Rams franchise in the National Football League and the ninth season playing its home games in Los Angeles.

Program for the Rams' December 4 game against the visiting Baltimore Colts.

== Schedule ==
| Game | Date | Opponent | Result | Record | Venue | Attendance | Recap | Sources |
|---|---|---|---|---|---|---|---|---|
| 1 | September 26 | at **Baltimore Colts** | **W** 48–0 | 1–0 | Memorial Stadium | 36,215 | Recap | |
| 2 | October 3 | **San Francisco 49ers** | **T** 24–24 | 1–0–1 | L.A. Memorial Coliseum | 93,621 | | |
| 3 | October 10 | at **Detroit Lions** | **L** 3–21 | 1–1–1 | Briggs Stadium | 55,008 | | |
| 4 | October 17 | at **Green Bay Packers** | **L** 17–35 | 1–2–1 | Milwaukee County Stadium | 17,465 | | |
| 5 | October 24 | **Chicago Bears** | **W** 42–38 | 2–2–1 | L.A. Memorial Coliseum | 48,204 | | |
| 6 | October 31 | **Detroit Lions** | **L** 24–27 | 2–3–1 | L.A. Memorial Coliseum | 74,315 | | |
| 7 | November 7 | at **San Francisco 49ers** | **W** 42–34 | 3–3–1 | Kezar Stadium | 58,958 | | |
| 8 | November 14 | Chicago Cardinals | **W** 28–17 | 4–3–1 | L.A. Memorial Coliseum | 40,786 | | |
| 9 | November 21 | at New York Giants | **W** 17–16 | 5–3–1 | Polo Grounds | 27,077 | | |
| 10 | November 28 | at **Chicago Bears** | **L** 13–24 | 5–4–1 | Wrigley Field | 32,338 | | |
| 11 | December 4 | **Baltimore Colts** | **L** 21–22 | 5–5–1 | L.A. Memorial Coliseum | 30,821 | | |
| 12 | December 12 | **Green Bay Packers** | **W** 35–27 | 6–5–1 | L.A. Memorial Coliseum | 38,839 | | |
Note: Intra-conference opponents are in **bold** text.

=== Standings ===
NFL Western Conference
| | W | L | T | PCT | CONF | PF | PA | STK |
|---|---|---|---|---|---|---|---|---|
| Detroit Lions | 9 | 2 | 1 | .818 | 8–2 | 337 | 189 | W1 |
| Chicago Bears | 8 | 4 | 0 | .667 | 7–3 | 301 | 279 | W4 |
| San Francisco 49ers | 7 | 4 | 1 | .636 | 5–4–1 | 313 | 251 | W2 |
| Los Angeles Rams | 6 | 5 | 1 | .545 | 4–5–1 | 314 | 285 | W1 |
| Green Bay Packers | 4 | 8 | 0 | .333 | 3–7 | 234 | 251 | L4 |
| Baltimore Colts | 3 | 9 | 0 | .250 | 2–8 | 131 | 279 | L1 |

Note: Tie games were not officially counted in the standings until 1972.

== Final roster ==
1954 Los Angeles Rams roster
| Quarterbacks (QB): 11 Norm Van Brocklin P; 9 Bill Wade; Running backs (RB): 20 Woodley Lewis; 23 Tom McCormick; 21 Skeet Quinlan; 32 Dan Towler; 35 Tank Younger; Wide receivers (WR): 82 Bob Boyd; 80 Tom Fears; 40 Elroy Hirsch; Tight ends (TE) | Offensive linemen (OL): 73 Bobby Cross T; 71 Tom Dahms T; 50 Leon McLaughlin C; 61 Duane Putnam G; 66 Harry Thompson G; 70 Charlie Toogood T; Defensive linemen (DL): 65 Art Hauser DT/MG; 78 Gene Lipscomb DT; 62 Bud McFadin DT/MG; 81 Paul Miller DE; 84 Andy Robustelli DE; 89 Duane Wardlow DE; 64 Stan West MG | Linebackers (LB): 58 Bob Griffin C; 57 Don Paul; 67 Les Richter G/K; 76 Harland Svare; Defensive backs (DB): 42 Bill Bowers CB; 44 Don Doll CB/S; 29 Jack Dwyer S; 22 Hall Haynes CB; 49 Ed Hughes CB/S; 43 Will Sherman S; Special teams (ST) | Reserve: -- Ed Beatty C (IR); -- Rudy Bukich QB (Military); 88 Bob Carey WR (IR); -- Dick Daugherty G (Military); -- Bob Fry T (Military); -- Frank Fuller DT (Military); 63 John Hock G (IR); -- Brad Myers RB (Military); Rookies in italics |
