= 1954 NFL season =

American football season

Regular season
- Duration: September 26 – December 26, 1954
- East Champions: Cleveland Browns
- West Champions: Detroit Lions

Championship Game
- Champions: Cleveland Browns

NFL teams: West, East

The 1954 NFL season was the 35th regular season of the National Football League. The season ended when the Cleveland Browns defeated the Detroit Lions in the NFL Championship Game.

== Draft ==
The 1954 NFL draft was held on January 28, 1954, at The Bellevue-Stratford Hotel in Philadelphia. With the first pick, the Cleveland Browns selected quarterback Bobby Garrett from Stanford University.

== Major rule changes ==
- Whenever it is raining, or whenever the field is wet and slippery, the offensive team can request a new, dry playable ball at any time.

== Division races ==
In the Western Division, the 49ers pulled ahead in Week Five (October 24) with a 37–31 win over the Lions, but they lost four of their remaining seven games and finished 7–4–1.

The Lions, on the other hand, won six of their last seven, and finished 9–2–1. In the Eastern race, the Eagles got off to a 4–0 start, until dropping games to Pittsburgh (17–7) and Green Bay (37–14) to fall into a three-way tie with the Giants and Steelers. The Browns, who got off to a 1–2 start, went on an 8-game winning streak, gradually catching up with a Halloween win over New York (24–14).

A 6–0 win over Philadelphia on November 21 gave them the conference lead, and a 16–7 rematch win in New York the next week extended the margin.

The Browns' streak was ended on December 19 with a 14–10 loss to the Lions, but when the teams met in Cleveland again the next week for the Championship, the Browns beat the Lions in a 56–10 rout.

Week	Western		Eastern	
1	3 teams (Det, LA, SF)	1–0–0	3 teams (NYG, Phi, Pit)	1–0–0
2	3 teams (Det, LA, SF)	1–0–1	Tie (Phi, Pit)	2–0–0
3	Tie (Det, SF)	2–0–1	Philadelphia Eagles	3–0–0
4	Tie (Det, SF)	3–0–1	Philadelphia Eagles	4–0–0
5	San Francisco 49ers	4–0–1	3 teams (NYG, PHI, PIT)	4–1–0
6	Tie (Det, SF)	4–1–1	3 teams (NYG, PHI, PIT)	4–2–0
7	Detroit Lions	5–1–0	Tie (NYG, PHI)	5–2–0
8	Detroit Lions	6–1–0	New York Giants	6–2–0
9	Detroit Lions	7–1–0	Cleveland Browns	6–2–0
10	Detroit Lions	8–1–0	Cleveland Browns	7–2–0
11	Detroit Lions	8–1–1	Cleveland Browns	8–2–0
12	Detroit Lions	8–2–1	Cleveland Browns	9–2–0
13	Detroit Lions	9–2–1	Cleveland Browns	9–3–0

== Final standings ==
NFL Eastern Conference
	W	L	T	PCT	CONF	PF	PA	STK
Cleveland Browns	9	3	0	.750	8–2	336	162	L1
Philadelphia Eagles	7	4	1	.636	7–3	284	230	W1
New York Giants	7	5	0	.583	7–3	293	184	L1
Pittsburgh Steelers	5	7	0	.417	4–6	219	263	L2
Washington Redskins	3	9	0	.250	2–8	207	432	W1
Chicago Cardinals	2	10	0	.167	2–8	183	347	L3

Note: Tie games were not officially counted in the standings until 1972.

NFL Western Conference
	W	L	T	PCT	CONF	PF	PA	STK
Detroit Lions	9	2	1	.818	8–2	337	189	W1
Chicago Bears	8	4	0	.667	7–3	301	279	W4
San Francisco 49ers	7	4	1	.636	5–4–1	313	251	W2
Los Angeles Rams	6	5	1	.545	4–5–1	314	285	W1
Green Bay Packers	4	8	0	.333	3–7	234	251	L4
Baltimore Colts	3	9	0	.250	2–8	131	279	L1

== NFL Championship Game ==
Cleveland 56, Detroit 10 at Cleveland Stadium, Cleveland, Ohio, December 26, 1954

== League leaders ==
Statistic	Name	Team	Yards
Passing	Norm Van Brocklin	Los Angeles	2637
Rushing	Joe Perry	San Francisco	1049
Receiving	Bob Boyd	Los Angeles	1212

== Awards ==
- Sporting News NFL Player of the Year – Lou Groza, Cleveland Browns
- UPI NFL Most Valuable Player – Joe Perry, San Francisco 49ers

== Coaching changes ==
- Baltimore Colts: Keith Molesworth was replaced by Weeb Ewbank.
- Green Bay Packers: Lisle Blackbourn became the Packers' new head coach. Gene Ronzani resigned after 10 games into 1953. Hugh Devore and Ray McLean served as co-head coaches for the rest of the 1953 season.
- Pittsburgh Steelers: Joe Bach was replaced by Walt Kiesling.
- New York Giants: Steve Owen was replaced by Jim Lee Howell.
- Washington Redskins: Curly Lambeau was replaced by Joe Kuharich.

== Other sources consulted ==
- NFL Record and Fact Book (ISBN 1-932994-36-X)
- NFL History 1951–1960 (Last accessed December 4, 2005)
- Total Football: The Official Encyclopedia of the National Football League (ISBN 0-06-270174-6)
