= 1953 Mississippi Vocational Delta Devils football team =

American college football season

1953 Mississippi Vocational Delta Devils football
- Conference: Independent
- Record: 2–4
- Head coach: Cleophus Hatcher (1st season)
- Home stadium: Legion Field

1953 Southern college football independents records
	Conf.			Overall
Team	W	L	T	W		L		T
Arkansas State		–		8	–	0	–	2
Delaware		–		7	–	1	–	0
Maryland State		–		7	–	1	–	0
Mississippi Southern		–		9	–	2	–	0
Navy		–		4	–	3	–	2
Memphis State		–		6	–	4	–	0
Florida State		–		5	–	5	–	0
Tampa		–		6	–	6	–	0
Miami (FL)		–		4	–	5	–	0
Sewanee		–		3	–	5	–	0
Marshall		–		2	–	5	–	2
Chattanooga		–		3	–	7	–	0
Louisville		–		1	–	7	–	0
Virginia		–		1	–	8	–	0

The 1953 Mississippi Vocational Delta Devils football team, sometimes called Mississippi Polytech, represented Mississippi Vocational College—now known as Mississippi Valley State University—as an independent during the 1953 college football season. Led by first-year head coach Cleophus Hatcher, the Delta Devils compiled a 2–4 record. Mississippi Vocational played home games at Legion Field in Greenwood, Mississippi.

== Schedule ==
Date	Time	Opponent	Site	Result	Source
September 26		Miles*	Legion Field; Greenwood, MS	L 0–32	
October 3	8:00 p.m.	Jackson*	Legion Field; Greenwood, MS	L 6–7	
October 24	8:00 p.m.	at Paul Quinn	Katy Field; Waco, TX	L 0–13	
October 31		Rust	Itta Bena, MS	W 32–8	
November 7		at Philander Smith	War Memorial Stadium; Little Rock, AR	W 20–12	
November 21	2:30 p.m.	Mississippi Industrial	Legion Field; Greenwood, MS	L 13–30	
*Non-conference game; All times are in Central time
