= 1953 Xavier Musketeers football team =

American college football season

1953 Xavier Musketeers football
- Conference: Independent
- Record: 2–7–1
- Head coach: Ed Kluska (7th season)
- Home stadium: Xavier Stadium

1953 Midwestern college football independents records
	Conf.			Overall
Team	W	L	T	W		L		T
No. 2 Notre Dame		–		9	–	0	–	1
Cincinnati		–		9	–	1	–	0
Carthage		–		8	–	1	–	0
Youngstown		–		7	–	1	–	0
John Carroll		–		7	–	2	–	0
Washington University		–		7	–	2	–	0
Rose Poly		–		6	–	2	–	0
Wabash		–		6	–	2	–	1
Marquette		–		6	–	3	–	1
Baldwin–Wallace		–		4	–	4	–	0
Drake		–		4	–	4	–	0
Wayne		–		3	–	4	–	1
Dayton		–		3	–	5	–	1
Michigan Tech		–		2	–	5	–	0
Xavier		–		2	–	7	–	1
Rankings from AP Poll

The 1953 Xavier Musketeers football team was an American football team that represented Xavier University as an independent during the 1953 college football season. In their seventh year under head coach Ed Kluska, the Musketeers compiled a 2–7–1 record.

== Schedule ==
Date	Opponent	Site	Result	Attendance	Source
September 20	Quantico Marines	Xavier Stadium; Cincinnati, OH	L 6–13	14,500	
September 27	Dayton	Xavier Stadium; Cincinnati, OH	W 7–0	11,000	
October 3	at Miami (OH)	Miami Field; Oxford, OH	L 6–28	9,500	
October 10	at Louisville	Parkway Field; Louisville, KY	W 19–13	4,500	
October 17	at Cincinnati	Nippert Stadium; Cincinnati, OH (rivalry)	L 6–20	30,000	
October 25	Boston College	Xavier Stadium; Cincinnati, OH	L 14–31	10,000	
October 31	at Villanova	Connie Mack Stadium; Philadelphia, PA	L 14–21	5,610–5,612	
November 7	John Carroll	Xavier Stadium; Cincinnati, OH	L 19–33	8,500	
November 13	at Chattanooga	Chamberlain Field; Chattanooga, TN	L 6–16	6,000	
November 22	at Dayton	UD Stadium; Dayton, OH	T 0–0	2,300	
