= 1953 Dayton Flyers football team =

American college football season

1953 Dayton Flyers football
- Conference: Independent
- Record: 3–5–1
- Head coach: Joe Gavin (7th season)
- Home stadium: UD Stadium

1953 Midwestern college football independents records
	Conf.			Overall
Team	W	L	T	W		L		T
No. 2 Notre Dame		–		9	–	0	–	1
Cincinnati		–		9	–	1	–	0
Carthage		–		8	–	1	–	0
Youngstown		–		7	–	1	–	0
John Carroll		–		7	–	2	–	0
Washington University		–		7	–	2	–	0
Rose Poly		–		6	–	2	–	0
Wabash		–		6	–	2	–	1
Marquette		–		6	–	3	–	1
Baldwin–Wallace		–		4	–	4	–	0
Drake		–		4	–	4	–	0
Wayne		–		3	–	4	–	1
Dayton		–		3	–	5	–	1
Michigan Tech		–		2	–	5	–	0
Xavier		–		2	–	7	–	1
Rankings from AP Poll

The 1953 Dayton Flyers football team represented the University of Dayton as an independent during the 1953 college football season. In their seventh season under head coach Joe Gavin, the Flyers compiled a 3–5–1 record. Dayton played their home games at UD Stadium in Dayton, Ohio.

== Schedule ==
Date	Opponent	Site	Result	Attendance	Source
September 27	at Xavier	Xavier Stadium; Cincinnati, OH	L 0–7	11,000	
October 4	Quantico Marines	UD Stadium; Dayton, OH	L 0–31	6,400	
October 11	at John Carroll	Shaw Stadium; East Cleveland, OH	L 13–19	6,349	
October 17	Louisville^{†}	UD Stadium; Dayton, OH	W 20–13	7,000	
October 24	Chattanooga	UD Stadium; Dayton, OH	W 19–6		
October 31	at Cincinnati	Nippert Stadium; Cincinnati, OH	L 0–27	20,000	
November 7	at Marshall	Fairfield Stadium; Huntington, WV	W 21–0		
November 14	Miami (OH)	UD Stadium; Dayton, OH	L 7–20	8,500	
November 22	Xavier	UD Stadium; Dayton, OH	T 0–0	2,300	
^{†}Homecoming; Source:
