= 1953 Troy State Red Wave football team =

American college football season

1953 Troy State Red Wave football
- Conference: Alabama Intercollegiate Conference
- Record: 3–5 (2–1 AIC)
- Head coach: Jim Grantham (3rd season)
- Home stadium: Veterans Memorial Stadium

The 1953 Troy State Red Wave football team represented Troy State Teachers College (now known as Troy University) as a member of the Alabama Intercollegiate Conference (AIC) during the 1953 college football season. Led by third-year head coach Jim Grantham, the Red Wave compiled an overall record of 3–5, with a mark of 2–1 in conference play.

== Schedule ==
Date	Opponent	Site	Result	Attendance	Source
September 18	vs. Tampa*	Memorial Stadium; Columbus, GA	L 7–21	6,000	
October 3	vs. Livingston State	Cramton Bowl; Montgomery, AL	W 7–0	1,500	
October 10	Middle Tennessee*	Veterans Memorial Stadium; Troy, AL (rivalry)	L 0–6		
October 17	Jacksonville State^{†}	Veterans Memorial Stadium; Troy, AL (rivalry)	W 13–7	2,000	
October 31	vs. Howard (AL)*	Municipal Stadium; Andalusia, AL	W 31–7		
November 7	Florence State	Veterans Memorial Stadium; Troy, AL	L 6–26		
November 14	at Newberry*	Setzler Field; Newberry, SC	L 0–13		
November 21	at Delta State*	Delta Field; Cleveland, MS	L 2–6		
*Non-conference game; ^{†}Homecoming
