= Jim Grantham =

American football coach (1919–1996)

Biographical details
- Born: October 9, 1919; Llano, Texas, U.S.
- Died: January 15, 1996 (aged 76); Llano, Texas, U.S.
- Education: University of Alabama (1947)

Playing career

Football
- 1943–1946: Alabama

Track and field
- 1943–1946: Alabama
- Positions: Split end, defensive end (football)

Coaching career (HC unless noted)

Football
- 1947: Aliceville HS (AL)
- 1948–1950: Peekskill Military Academy (NY) (assistant)
- 1951–1954: Troy State
- 1955–1957: Rutherford HS (NJ)
- 1958–1959: Hasbrouck Heights HS (NJ)
- 1960–after 1966: Hicksville HS (NY)

Baseball
- 1951–1953: Troy State

Head coaching record
- Overall: 11–23–1 (college football); 9–1 (high school football; Aliceville)

James Morris Grantham (October 9, 1919 – January 15, 1996) was an American college football coach. He was the head football coach for Troy State Teachers College—now known as Troy University—from 1951 to 1954. He was the head football coach for Aliceville High School in 1947, Rutherford High School from 1955 to 1957, Hasbrouck Heights High School from 1958 to 1959, and Hicksville High School. He also coached for Peekskill Military Academy. He played college football for Alabama as a split end and defensive end.

== Head coaching record ==
=== College football ===
Year	Team	Overall	Conference	Standing	Bowl/playoffs
Troy State Red Wave (Alabama Intercollegiate Conference) (1951–1954)
1951	Troy State	2–7	0–3		
1952	Troy State	4–6	2–1		
1953	Troy State	3–5	2–1		
1954	Troy State	2–5–1	1–2		
Troy State:		11–23–1	5–7		
Total:		11–23–1			
