= 1953 Cincinnati Bearcats football team =

American college football season

1953 Cincinnati Bearcats football
- Conference: Independent
- Record: 9–1
- Head coach: Sid Gillman (5th season)
- Captains: Don Fritz; Dom Del Bene
- Home stadium: Nippert Stadium

1953 Midwestern college football independents records
	Conf.			Overall
Team	W	L	T	W		L		T
No. 2 Notre Dame		–		9	–	0	–	1
Cincinnati		–		9	–	1	–	0
Carthage		–		8	–	1	–	0
Youngstown		–		7	–	1	–	0
John Carroll		–		7	–	2	–	0
Washington University		–		7	–	2	–	0
Rose Poly		–		6	–	2	–	0
Wabash		–		6	–	2	–	1
Marquette		–		6	–	3	–	1
Baldwin–Wallace		–		4	–	4	–	0
Drake		–		4	–	4	–	0
Wayne		–		3	–	4	–	1
Dayton		–		3	–	5	–	1
Michigan Tech		–		2	–	5	–	0
Xavier		–		2	–	7	–	1
Rankings from AP Poll

The 1953 Cincinnati Bearcats football team was an American football team that represented the University of Cincinnati as an independent during the 1953 college football season. The Bearcats were led by head coach Sid Gillman and compiled a 9–1 record.

== Schedule ==
Date	Opponent	Site	Result	Attendance	Source
September 19	at Tulsa	Skelly Stadium; Tulsa, OK	W 14–7	14,057	
September 26	at Marquette	Marquette Stadium; Milwaukee, WI	L 7–31	15,500	
October 3	William & Mary	Nippert Stadium; Cincinnati, OH	W 57–7	21,000	
October 10	Toledo	Nippert Stadium; Cincinnati, OH	W 41–7	15,000	
October 17	Xavier	Nippert Stadium; Cincinnati, OH (rivalry)	W 20–6	30,000	
October 24	Western Reserve	Nippert Stadium; Cincinnati, OH	W 66–0		
October 31	Dayton^{†}	Nippert Stadium; Cincinnati, OH	W 27–0	20,000	
November 7	at Louisville	Parkway Field; Louisville, KY (rivalry)	W 41–0	3,500	
November 14	VMI	Nippert Stadium; Cincinnati, OH	W 67–0	16,000–17,000	
November 26	Miami (OH)	Nippert Stadium; Cincinnati, OH (Victory Bell)	W 14–0	26,000	
^{†}Homecoming
