= 1953 Jacksonville State Gamecocks football team =

American college football season

1953 Jacksonville State Gamecocks football
- Conference: Alabama Intercollegiate Conference
- Record: 3–5–1 (0–3 AIC)
- Head coach: Ray Wedgeworth (1st season)
- Home stadium: College Bowl

The 1953 Jacksonville State Gamecocks football team represented Jacksonville State Teachers College (now known as Jacksonville State University) as a member of the Alabama Intercollegiate Conference (AIC) during the 1953 college football season. Led by first-year head coach Ray Wedgeworth, the Gamecocks compiled an overall record of 3–5–1 with a mark of 0–3 in conference play.

== Schedule ==
Date	Opponent	Site	Result	Source
September 19	vs. Livingston State	Demopolis, AL	L 7–18	
September 26	Maryville (TN)*	College Bowl; Jacksonville, AL	T 0–0	
October 2	at Chattanooga*	Chamberlain Field; Chattanooga, TN	L 0–39	
October 10	at South Georgia*	Douglas, GA	W 19–7	
October 17	at Troy State	Veterans Memorial Stadium; Troy, AL (rivalry)	L 7–13	
October 24	vs. Austin Peay*	Murphree Stadium; Gadsden, AL	L 16–41	
October 31	West Georgia*	College Bowl; Jacksonville, AL	W 40–0	
November 14	Florence State	College Bowl; Jacksonville, AL	L 0–26	
November 21	vs. Howard (AL)*	Memorial Stadium; Anniston, AL (rivalry)	W 26–13	
*Non-conference game
