= Cincinnati–Xavier rivalry =

American college sports rivalry

- Cincinnati Bearcats Xavier Musketeers
- Sport: Football, basketball, others
- First meeting: 1918

Locations of Cincinnati and Xavier

The Cincinnati–Xavier rivalry is a college sports rivalry between the University of Cincinnati Bearcats and the Xavier University Musketeers. The two schools are separated by less than 3 miles (4.8 km) in Cincinnati, making the archrivalry one of the closest major rivalries in the country. The rivalry dates to their first college football game between the teams in 1918. The first men's college basketball game was played in 1927, which has become the most famous sport in the rivalry, known as the Crosstown Shootout. National outlets cover the game each year, many considering it one of the fiercest rivalries in college basketball. The college football series would run until the Xavier Musketeers football ceased play after their final season in 1973. Many other sports at the universities, such as baseball, also face off annually.

== History ==
College Comparison
	Cincinnati	Xavier
Founded	1819	1831
Type	Public	Private
Affiliation	State of Ohio	Catholic (Jesuit)
Conference	Big 12	Big East
Students	44,338	6,798
School colors		
Nickname	Bearcats	Musketeers

Cincinnati is the smallest city to be home to two power conference basketball teams. Combined with a metro population of around 2.1 million and the schools being a mere 3 miles apart, the rivalry runs deep for many in the Greater Cincinnati region. The original contest in the Crosstown Shootout was a much awaited match up between the schools, as Cincinnati helped Xavier dedicate the newly opened Schmidt Fieldhouse in 1928. Over time, the series began to develop an imbalance as Cincinnati became a national powerhouse in basketball and enrollments began to quickly grow compared to Xavier in the 1950s and 60's. However, the "little brother" would knock off UC from time to time in both football and basketball much to the disappointment of the Bearcat faithful. After Xavier shuttered its football program in 1973, the main attention of the rivalry turned to basketball. By the 1990s both teams had become bonafide programs with Xavier knocking off two No. 1 Bearcats teams in series history. Although Cincinnati fans will point to the all-time series dominance, Xavier fans will be quick to retort that the Musketeers have won 12 of the last 18 contests as of 2020.

== Football ==
Cincinnati–Xavier football rivalry
- Cincinnati Bearcats Xavier Musketeers
- Sport: Football
- First meeting: December 7, 1918; Cincinnati, 12–0
- Latest meeting: September 15, 1973; Cincinnati, 40–7

Statistics
- Total meetings: 30
- All-time series: Cincinnati leads, 18–12
- Largest victory: Cincinnati, 42–0 (1970)
- Longest win streak: Cincinnati, 4 (1968–1971)

Cincinnati and Xavier would first play in 1918, but the series would not become an annual event until 1946. The game would be played each year at Cincinnati's Nippert Stadium as the venue had a larger capacity to accommodate the cross city showdown compared to Xavier's Corcoran Stadium.

Joseph A. Meyer holds the distinction of coaching both schools in football, but only in the rivalry game once. He would lead to Bearcats to victory over the Musketeers in 1942.

In the 1960s and 1970s Xavier's team experienced a downturn with the Xavier board of trustees finally voting to eliminate the football program, which had caused financial strain on the university after the 1973 season. At the time of the decision, UC Coach Tony Mason lamented the loss of the series. He compared it to other city rivalries in college football such as the UCLA–USC rivalry and stated, "There's no way to replace that kind of rivalry."

=== Notable games ===
October 25, 1947:In a tight game in front of a sold out crowd, the Bearcats managed to scoot by the Musketeers thanks to the fantastic play of halfback Roger Stephens. The Bearcats would win 27–25 and go onto capture the MAC title.

November 17, 1951: The biggest matchup of the series, over 30,000 fans packed into Nippert Stadium to watch the 9–0 Bearcats take on the 7–0–1 Musketeers. UC would stall three times inside the Musketeer's 20 yard line. After a 98 yard pick six, Xavier would crack the game wide open against Sid Gillman's Bearcats and the Musketeers would be victorious 26–0.

October 13, 1956: In UC's Homecoming game, Xavier would end up triumphant winning 34–14. Xavier's excited fans would uproot and take UC's goalposts from the field in the post-game excitement. Xavier's student council would later offer $500 to Cincinnati to cover costs.

September 28, 1968: Xavier entered into the contest as favorites, but the Bearcats were led by the one-two punch of QB Greg Cook and WR/K Jim O'Brien. The Musketeers fought valiantly and the Bearcats only managed to win on a fourth quarter field goal from O'Brien.

=== Game results ===
Cincinnati victories	Xavier victories	Tie games

No.	Date	Location	Winner	Score
1	December 7, 1918	Nippert Stadium	Cincinnati	12–0
2	November 21, 1942	Nippert Stadium	Cincinnati	9–0
3	November 9, 1946	Nippert Stadium	Cincinnati	39–0
4	October 25, 1947	Nippert Stadium	Cincinnati	27–25
5	October 2, 1948	Nippert Stadium	Xavier	13–7
6	November 12, 1949	Nippert Stadium	Xavier	20–14
7	November 18, 1950	Nippert Stadium	Cincinnati	33–20
8	November 17, 1951	Nippert Stadium	Xavier	26–0
9	October 11, 1952	Nippert Stadium	Cincinnati	20–13
10	October 17, 1953	Nippert Stadium	Cincinnati	20–6
11	October 23, 1954	Nippert Stadium	Cincinnati	33–0
12	October 8, 1955	Nippert Stadium	Xavier	37–0
13	October 13, 1956	Nippert Stadium	Xavier	34–14
14	October 12, 1957	Nippert Stadium	Cincinnati	23–14
15	October 11, 1958	Nippert Stadium	Cincinnati	14–8
16	October 31, 1959	Nippert Stadium	Cincinnati	28–0

No.	Date	Location	Winner	Score
17	October 29, 1960	Nippert Stadium	Xavier	5–0
18	October 7, 1961	Nippert Stadium	Xavier	17–12
19	November 24, 1962	Nippert Stadium	Xavier	7–6
20	October 5, 1963	Nippert Stadium	Cincinnati	35–22
21	October 10, 1964	Nippert Stadium	Cincinnati	35–6
22	October 9, 1965	Nippert Stadium	Xavier	14–3
23	October 8, 1966	Nippert Stadium	Xavier	25–13
24	October 14, 1967	Nippert Stadium	Xavier	15–10
25	September 28, 1968	Nippert Stadium	Cincinnati	17–14
26	October 4, 1969	Nippert Stadium	Cincinnati	17–14
27	October 10, 1970	Nippert Stadium	Cincinnati	42–0
28	October 9, 1971	Nippert Stadium	Cincinnati	10–9
29	September 23, 1972	Nippert Stadium	Xavier	19–7
30	September 15, 1973	Nippert Stadium	Cincinnati	40–7
Series: Cincinnati leads 18–12

== Women's basketball ==
Both sides face off to secure the Kendle Cup. Cincinnati leads the all time series 28–19.

=== Game results ===
Cincinnati victories	Xavier victories	Tie games

No.	Date	Location	Winner	Score
1	January 16, 1979	Riverfront Coliseum	Cincinnati	79–37
2	February 4, 1980	Schmidt Field House	Cincinnati	80–54
3	February 18, 1981	Schmidt Field House	Cincinnati	82–53
4	January 27, 1982	Riverfront Coliseum	Cincinnati	76–67
5	January 26, 1983	Riverfront Coliseum	Cincinnati	90–58
6	January 26, 1984	Schmidt Field House	Cincinnati	87–76
7	December 28, 1984	Riverfront Coliseum	Cincinnati	99–71
8	February 5, 1986	Schmidt Field House	Cincinnati	84–74
9	January 28, 1987	Cincinnati Gardens	Cincinnati	73–53
10	January 28, 1988	Schmidt Field House	Cincinnati	61–39
11	November 30, 1988	Cincinnati Gardens	Cincinnati	67–48
12	December 5, 1989	Schmidt Field House	Xavier	65–53
13	November 27, 1990	Fifth Third Arena	Xavier	60–48
14	January 22, 1992	Schmidt Field House	Xavier	73–63
15	February 23, 1993	Fifth Third Arena	Xavier	81–48
16	January 18, 1994	Schmidt Field House	Xavier	84–68
17	January 30, 1995	Fifth Third Arena	Cincinnati	83–77
18	January 10, 1996	Schmidt Field House	Xavier	77–66
19	January 6, 1997	Fifth Third Arena	Cincinnati	83–58
20	January 28, 1998	Schmidt Field House	Cincinnati	78–72
21	February 10, 1999	Fifth Third Arena	Cincinnati	65–61^{OT}
22	December 5, 1999	Schmidt Field House	Cincinnati	77–71^{2OT}
23	December 12, 2000	Fifth Third Arena	Cincinnati	75–59
24	December 2, 2001	Cintas Center	Cincinnati	62–56

No.	Date	Location	Winner	Score
25	December 28, 2002	Fifth Third Arena	Cincinnati	61–56
26	November 30, 2003	Cintas Center	Cincinnati	52–41
27	December 11, 2004	Fifth Third Arena	Xavier	85–50
28	November 30, 2005	Cintas Center	Xavier	87–60
29	January 17, 2007	Fifth Third Arena	Xavier	89–76
30	December 1, 2007	Cintas Center	Cincinnati	61–55
31	December 7, 2008	Fifth Third Arena	Cincinnati	65–55
32	December 6, 2009	Cintas Center	Xavier	69–38
33	December 5, 2010	Fifth Third Arena	Xavier	69–61
34	December 4, 2011	Cintas Center	Xavier	69–60
35	December 12, 2012	Fifth Third Arena	Xavier	69–67^{2OT}
36	December 21, 2013	Cintas Center	Cincinnati	47–26
37	December 14, 2014	Fifth Third Arena	Xavier	72–71
38	December 13, 2015	Cintas Center	Xavier	65–56
39	December 11, 2016	Fifth Third Arena	Xavier	72–61
40	December 10, 2017	Cintas Center	Xavier	53–50
41	December 16, 2018	Fifth Third Arena	Cincinnati	79–61
42	December 14, 2019	Cintas Center	Cincinnati	85–78
43	December 12, 2021	Fifth Third Arena	Cincinnati	82–73
44	December 9, 2022	Cintas Center	Xavier	48–35
45	December 10, 2023	Fifth Third Arena	Cincinnati	69–47
46	December 15, 2024	Cintas Center	Cincinnati	60–48
47	December 7, 2025	Fifth Third Arena	Xavier	77–70
Series: Cincinnati leads 28–19

=== Wins by venue ===
Category	Cincinnati	Xavier
Schmidt Field House	7	4
Cincinnati Gardens	2	0
Riverfront Coliseum	4	0
Fifth Third Arena	9	8
Cintas Center	6	5

== Baseball ==
Cincinnati leads the all-time series with the Musketeers, 99–58 as of the end of the 2021 season.

Each year since 2008, the teams play in the Joe Nuxhall Classic. This is a regional tournament that takes place between Cincinnati, Xavier, Wright State, and Miami (OH).

A recent wrinkle added to the college baseball rivalry between the teams, is current Bearcats manager Scott Googins. Googins who was the previous manager of Xavier from 2006–2017, and his arrival to Clifton brought additional attention to the contest.

On May 18, 2019, the teams played their final season game at Great American Ball Park immediately following the Cincinnati Reds game that same day.
