= Cleophus Hatcher =

American football coach (1925–1983)

Biographical details
- Born: June 18, 1925
- Died: August 1983

Playing career

Football
- late 1940s: West Virginia State

Baseball
- late 1940s: West Virginia State

Track and field
- late 1940s: West Virginia State
- Position: Tackle

Coaching career (HC unless noted)

Football
- 1951: Claflin
- 1953: Mississippi Vocational
- 1956–1957: Morris
- 1962–1965: Howard (backfield)
- 1966–1968: Cheyney

Head coaching record
- Overall: 18–35–2

Cleophus C. Hatcher (June 18, 1925 – August 1983) was an American college football coach. He served as the head football coach at Claflin College (now known as Claflin University in Orangeburg, South Carolina, Mississippi Vocational College (now known as Mississippi Valley State University) in Itta Bena, Mississippi, Morris College in Sumter, South Carolina, and Cheyney State Teachers College (now known as Cheyney University of Pennsylvania) in Cheyney, Pennsylvania.

Hatcher attended West Virginia State University, where he played football as a tackle. There he also played baseball and ran track. He later did graduate work at West Virginia University. Hatcher was the executive secretary of the Shenago Street branch of the YMCA in New Castle, Pennsylvania for four years before being hired, in 1962, as a teacher and coach at Howard University in Washington, D.C.

== Head coaching record ==
Year	Team	Overall	Conference	Standing	Bowl/playoffs
Claflin Panthers (Southeastern Athletic Conference) (1951)
1951	Claflin	4–4–1			
Claflin:		4–4–1			
Mississippi Vocational Delta Devils (Independent) (1953)
1953	Mississippi Vocational	2–4			
Mississippi Vocational:		2–4			
Morris Hornets (Southeastern Athletic Conference) (1956–1957)
1956	Morris	1–7–1			
1957	Morris	4–4			
Morris:		5–11–1			
Cheyney Wolves (Pennsylvania State Athletic Conference) (1966–1968)
1966	Cheyney	4–3	3–3	T–3rd (Eastern)	
1967	Cheyney	3–5	1–5	T–6th (Eastern)	
1968	Cheyney	0–8	0–6	7th (Eastern)	
Cheyney:		7–16	4–14		
Total:		18–35–2			
