= Ed Kluska =

American football coach (1917–1996)

Biographical details
- Born: 1917; Mount Pleasant, Pennsylvania, U.S.
- Died: April 20, 1996 (aged 79); Cincinnati, Ohio, U.S.

Playing career

Football
- c. 1939: Xavier

Basketball
- c. 1939: Xavier

Baseball
- c. 1939: Xavier

Coaching career (HC unless noted)

Football
- 1940–1942: Xavier (assistant)
- 1943–1946: Purcell HS (OH)
- 1947–1954: Xavier

Head coaching record
- Overall: 43–33–4 (college); 31–1–3 (high school)

Edward L. Kluska (1917 – April 20, 1996) was an American football coach. He served as the head football coach at the Xavier University from 1947 to 1954, compiling a record of 42–33–4. He died following a stroke on April 20, 1996, at Good Samaritan Hospital in Cincinnati, Ohio.

== Head coaching record ==
=== College ===
Year	Team	Overall	Conference	Standing	Bowl/playoffs
Xavier Musketeers (Independent) (1947–1954)
1947	Xavier	4–4–1			
1948	Xavier	4–6			
1949	Xavier	10–1			W Salad
1950	Xavier	8–1			
1951	Xavier	9–0–1			
1952	Xavier	4–6			
1953	Xavier	2–7–1			
1954	Xavier	2–8			
Xavier:		43–33–4			
Total:		43–33–4			
