= Ray Wedgeworth =

American sports coach (1908–1975)

Biographical details
- Born: February 14, 1908
- Died: February 1975 (aged 66)

Playing career

Football
- 1934: Birmingham–Southern
- Position: Center

Coaching career (HC unless noted)

Football
- 1947: Jacksonville State (assistant)
- 1953: Jacksonville State

Basketball
- 1951—1953: Jacksonville State

Baseball
- 1964—1970: Jacksonville State

Head coaching record
- Overall: 3–5–1 (football); 32–14 (basketball); 52–50 (baseball)

Ray Wedgeworth (February 14, 1908 – February 1975) was an American college football, baseball and basketball head coach. He served in all three capacities at Jacksonville State University.

He attended Birmingham Southern College in the early 1930s, where he played football as a center. Wedgeworth was hired as an assistant to Jacksonville State head football coach Don Salls for the 1947 season. The prior year, Salls' team had gone 3–5–1. In 1947, the Gamecocks posted a perfect 9–0 record.

For two seasons, from 1951 to 1953, he served as the head basketball coach at Jacksonville State. His teams amassed a 32–14 record. In 1953, Wedgeworth became head football coach for one season and amassed a 3–5–1 record. At Jacksonville State, he also served as the head baseball coach from 1964 until 1970, when he relinquished the post after he was diagnosed with cancer. The Jacksonville State baseball team compiled a 52–50 record during his tenure.

At the 1954 Blue–Gray Football Classic, Wedgeworth recommended Florence State Teachers' College flanker Harlon Hill to Chicago Bears scout Clark Shaughnessy. The Bears selected Hill in the 1954 NFL draft, and that season, he was named the National Football League Most Valuable Player by the Newspaper Enterprise Association (NEA).

== Head coaching record ==
Year	Team	Overall	Conference	Standing	Bowl/playoffs
Jacksonville State Gamecocks (Alabama Intercollegiate Conference) (1953)
1953	Jacksonville State	3–5–1	0–3	4th	
Jacksonville State:		3–5–1	0–3		
Total:		3–5–1			
