= 1953 Delaware Fightin' Blue Hens football team =

American college football season

1953 Delaware Fightin' Blue Hens football
- Conference: Independent
- Record: 7–1
- Head coach: David M. Nelson (3rd season)
- Captain: Johnny Borreson
- Home stadium: Delaware Stadium

1953 Southern college football independents records
	Conf.			Overall
Team	W	L	T	W		L		T
Arkansas State		–		8	–	0	–	2
Delaware		–		7	–	1	–	0
Maryland State		–		7	–	1	–	0
Mississippi Southern		–		9	–	2	–	0
Navy		–		4	–	3	–	2
Memphis State		–		6	–	4	–	0
Florida State		–		5	–	5	–	0
Tampa		–		6	–	6	–	0
Miami (FL)		–		4	–	5	–	0
Sewanee		–		3	–	5	–	0
Marshall		–		2	–	5	–	2
Mississippi Vocational		–		2	–	4	–	0
Chattanooga		–		3	–	7	–	0
Louisville		–		1	–	7	–	0
Virginia		–		1	–	8	–	0

The 1953 Delaware Fightin' Blue Hens football team was an American football team that represented the University of Delaware as an independent during the 1953 college football season. In its third season under head coach David M. Nelson, the team compiled a 7–1 record and outscored opponents by a total of 201 to 80. Johnny Borreson was the team captain. The team played its home games at Delaware Stadium in Newark, Delaware.

== Schedule ==
Date	Opponent	Site	Result	Attendance	Source
September 26	Gettysburg	Delaware Stadium; Newark, DE	W 19–7	5,000	
October 3	Lehigh	Delaware Stadium; Newark, DE (rivalry)	W 26–13	4,100	
October 10	West Chester	Delaware Stadium; Newark, DE (rivalry)	L 13–27	5,732	
October 17	New Hampshire	Delaware Stadium; Newark, DE	W 48–0	3,842	
October 24	at Connecticut	Gardner Dow Athletic Fields; Storrs, CT	W 30–7	10,800	
October 31	Muhlenberg	Delaware Stadium; Newark, DE	W 18–6	5,126	
November 14	at Lafayette	Fisher Field; Easton, PA	W 13–7	5,000	
November 21	at Bucknell	Memorial Stadium; Lewisburg, PA	W 34–13	2,500	
