= 1953 Northeast Louisiana State Indians football team =

American college football season

1953 Northeast Louisiana State Indians football
- Conference: Gulf States Conference
- Record: 1–9 (1–5 GSC)
- Head coach: James L. Malone (20th season)
- Home stadium: Brown Stadium

1953 Gulf States Conference football standings
	Conf.					Overall
Team	W		L		T	W		L		T
Northwestern State +	5	–	1	–	0	6	–	2	–	0
Louisiana Tech +	5	–	1	–	0	6	–	3	–	0
Southeastern Louisiana +	5	–	1	–	0	6	–	3	–	0
Southwestern Louisiana	2	–	4	–	0	4	–	7	–	0
McNeese State	2	–	4	–	0	3	–	6	–	0
Louisiana College	1	–	5	–	0	4	–	6	–	0
Northeast Louisiana State	1	–	5	–	0	1	–	9	–	0
+ – Conference co-champions

The 1953 Northeast Louisiana State Indians football team was an American football team that represented Northeast Louisiana State College (now known as the University of Louisiana at Monroe) in the Gulf States Conference during the 1953 college football season. In their 20th year under head coach James L. Malone, the team compiled a 1–9 record.

== Schedule ==
Date	Opponent	Site	Result	Attendance	Source
September 19	Southeastern Louisiana	Brown Stadium; Monroe, LA	L 0–28		
September 26	at Louisiana Tech	Tech Stadium; Ruston, LA (rivalry)	L 6–61	7,000	
October 10	McNeese State	Brown Stadium; Monroe, LA	L 6–38	2,200	
October 17	Western Kentucky*	Brown Stadium; Monroe, LA	L 0–28		
October 24	Arkansas A&M*	Brown Stadium; Monroe, LA	L 7–21		
October 31	at Livingston State*	Tiger Stadium; Livingston, AL	L 20–32		
November 7	at Northwestern State	Demon Stadium; Natchitoches, LA (rivalry)	L 0–7		
November 14	Louisiana College	Brown Stadium; Monroe, LA	L 19–21		
November 21	at Tennessee Tech*	Overall Field; Cookeville, TN	L 20–42		
November 28	Southwestern Louisiana	Brown Stadium; Monroe, LA (rivalry)	W 35–6		
*Non-conference game
