= Xavier Musketeers football =

Defunct college American football team

- First season: 1901
- Last season: 1973
- Location: Cincinnati, Ohio
- Stadium: Corcoran Stadium (capacity: 15,000)
- Colors: Navy blue, white, and gray
- All-time record: 302–222–22 (.573)
- Bowl record: 1–0 (1.000)

Claimed national championships
- 0

The Xavier Musketeers football program, formerly known as the St. Xavier Saints, was an American football program that represented Xavier University of Cincinnati, Ohio in college football from 1900 to 1943 and 1946 to 1973. Xavier discontinued its participation in intercollegiate football following the 1973 season, citing the escalating cost of the sport and resulting deficits.

== History ==
The program began in 1900 when the school was known as St. Xavier College and the team as the Saints. In its earliest season, the football team competed against both colleges and high schools, but gradually improved their schedule. In 1907, the school began a rivalry against the University of Dayton, then named St. Mary's Institute.

Joseph A. Meyer was the head coach for 16 years from 1920 to 1935. During the Meyer era, the football teams compiled a record of 85–44–6 (.652), including eight one- or two-loss seasons (1920–1922, 1925–1928, and 1934). The team name became known as the Musketeers at the beginning of the 1925 season. In 1929, the school built Corcoran Stadium.

The program's success continued under head coach Clem Crowe from 1935 to 1943. The 1941 team compiled a 9–1 record and outscored opponents by a total of 257 to 47.

After a temporary hiatus in the program during World War II, Ed Kluska took over as head coach and posted a 35–12–2 record between 1947 and 1951. The 1949 team went 10–1 and defeated Arizona State, 33–21, in the 1950 Salad Bowl. The 1950 team compiled an 8–1 record and defeated the otherwise unbeaten 1950 Miami Redskins football team that was coached by Woody Hayes and Ara Parseghian and that featured John Pont at halfback and Bo Schembechler at tackle. The 1951 team was undefeated and outscored opponents by a total of 305 to 46. Seven players from the 1950 and 1951 teams later played in the National Football League. Xavier declined an invitation to the 1952 Salad Bowl.

From the 1920s through the 1960s, Xavier scheduled regional and national opponents, including Haskell (1919–1920, 1922–1934), Kentucky (1935–1942, 1946–1949, 1956–1962), Marshall (1926, 1938–1940, 1942, 1946–1947, 1949, 1955–1958, 1961–1962, 1967–1968, 1971–1973), Louisville (1926, 1948–1953, 1955–1956, 1959–1962), Villanova (1952–1953, 1959–1960, 1962–1969), Detroit (1936, 1957–1964), Boston College (1952–1955), Loyola (1930–1933), UTEP (1963, 1965, 1969), Navy (1922–1923), and South Carolina (1936, 1938).

The program declined in the late 1960s and early 1970s, experiencing consecutive 1-9 seasons in 1969, 1970, and 1971. On December 19, 1973, the Xavier University Board of Trustees voted 15 to 3 to discontinue the school's intercollegiate football program, effective immediately. The university's president, Rev. Robert W. Mulligan, attributed the decision to the "spiraling costs of intercollegiate football" which had led to a $200,000 deficit in 1973 despite the team having its most successful season in five years.

As recently as 2013, Xavier fielded a club football team in the National Club Football Association. In 2023, students at the University began efforts to revive the club team. The team began practices in February 2024, and plans to compete against other universities in the 2024-25 school year.

== Head coaches ==
Tenure	Coach	Record	Pct.
1900–1917	None / staff	26–6–5	.770
1918–1919	Albert B. Lambert	10–3–1	.750
1920–1935	Joe Meyer	85–44–6	.652
1935–1943	Clem Crowe	46–32–2	.588
1946	Philip H. Bucklew	3–7	.300
1947–1954	Ed Kluska	42–33–4	.563
1955–1958	Harry Connolly	24–15	.615
1959–1961	Ed Doherty	15–15	.500
1962–1968	Ed Biles	40–27–3	.593
1969	Irvin A. Etler	1–9	.100
1970–1971	Dick Selcer	2–18	.100
1972–1973	Tom Cecchini	8–13–1	.386
Totals	11 coaches	302–222–22	.573

== Stadium ==
The Musketeers played their games in Corcoran Stadium, which opened in 1929 after a $300,000 fundraising drive led by future Governor of Ohio Myers Y. Cooper. The stadium could seat 15,000 spectators. Xavier demolished the stadium in 1988.
