= 1953 Marshall Thundering Herd football team =

American college football season

1953 Marshall Thundering Herd football
- Conference: Independent
- Record: 2–5–2
- Head coach: Herb Royer (1st season)
- Captains: John Chmara; Phil Milano
- Home stadium: Fairfield Stadium

1953 Southern college football independents records
| | Conf. | | | Overall |
| Team | W | L | T | W | | L | | T |
|---|---|---|---|---|---|---|---|---|
| Arkansas State | | – | | 8 | – | 0 | – | 2 |
| Delaware | | – | | 7 | – | 1 | – | 0 |
| Maryland State | | – | | 7 | – | 1 | – | 0 |
| Mississippi Southern | | – | | 9 | – | 2 | – | 0 |
| Navy | | – | | 4 | – | 3 | – | 2 |
| Memphis State | | – | | 6 | – | 4 | – | 0 |
| Florida State | | – | | 5 | – | 5 | – | 0 |
| Tampa | | – | | 6 | – | 6 | – | 0 |
| Miami (FL) | | – | | 4 | – | 5 | – | 0 |
| Sewanee | | – | | 3 | – | 5 | – | 0 |
| Marshall | | – | | 2 | – | 5 | – | 2 |
| Mississippi Vocational | | – | | 2 | – | 4 | – | 0 |
| Chattanooga | | – | | 3 | – | 7 | – | 0 |
| Louisville | | – | | 1 | – | 7 | – | 0 |
| Virginia | | – | | 1 | – | 8 | – | 0 |

The 1953 Marshall Thundering Herd football team was an American football team that represented Marshall University as an independent during the 1953 college football season. In its first season under head coach Herb Royer, the team compiled a 2–5–2 record and was outscored by a total of 180 to 109. John Chmara and Phil Milano were the team captains. The team played its home games at Fairfield Stadium in Huntington, West Virginia.

== Schedule ==
| Date | Opponent | Site | Result | Attendance | Source |
|---|---|---|---|---|---|
| September 19 | vs. VPI | Bluefield Municipal Stadium; Bluefield, WV | L 0–7 | | |
| September 26 | Morehead State | Fairfield Stadium; Huntington, WV | W 40–0 | | |
| October 3 | at John Carroll | Cleveland, OH | L 0–31 | | |
| October 10 | at Morris Harvey | Laidley Field; Charleston, WV | T 14–14 | | |
| October 17 | Miami (OH) | Fairfield Stadium; Huntington, WV | L 6–48 | | |
| October 24 | at Kent State | Memorial Stadium; Kent, OH | L 7–27 | | |
| November 7 | Dayton^{†} | Fairfield Stadium; Huntington, WV | L 7–21 | | |
| November 14 | Wofford | Fairfield Stadium; Huntington, WV | T 26–26 | | |
| November 21 | Ohio | Fairfield Stadium; Huntington, WV | W 9–6 | 3,000 | |
^{†}Homecoming
