= 1953 Navy Midshipmen football team =

American college football season

1953 Navy Midshipmen football
- Conference: Independent
- Record: 4–3–2
- Head coach: Eddie Erdelatz (4th season)
- Captain: Dick Olson
- Home stadium: Thompson Stadium

1953 Southern college football independents records
	Conf.			Overall
Team	W	L	T	W		L		T
Arkansas State		–		8	–	0	–	2
Delaware		–		7	–	1	–	0
Maryland State		–		7	–	1	–	0
Mississippi Southern		–		9	–	2	–	0
Navy		–		4	–	3	–	2
Memphis State		–		6	–	4	–	0
Florida State		–		5	–	5	–	0
Tampa		–		6	–	6	–	0
Miami (FL)		–		4	–	5	–	0
Sewanee		–		3	–	5	–	0
Marshall		–		2	–	5	–	2
Mississippi Vocational		–		2	–	4	–	0
Chattanooga		–		3	–	7	–	0
Louisville		–		1	–	7	–	0
Virginia		–		1	–	8	–	0

The 1953 Navy Midshipmen football team represented the United States Naval Academy (USNA) as an independent during the 1953 college football season. They began the season ranked 13th in the preseason AP poll. The team was led by fourth-year head coach Eddie Erdelatz.

== Schedule ==
Date	Time	Opponent	Rank	Site	TV	Result	Attendance	Source
September 26		William & Mary	No. 13	Thompson Stadium; Annapolis, MD		T 6–6	13,000	
October 3		Dartmouth^{†}		Thompson Stadium; Annapolis, MD		W 55–7	15,500	
October 10		vs. Cornell		Municipal Stadium; Baltimore, MD		W 26–6	27,000	
October 17		at Princeton	No. 14	Palmer Stadium; Princeton, NJ		W 65–7	44,000	
October 24		at Penn	No. 10	Franklin Field; Philadelphia, PA		L 6–9	52,210	
October 31		at No. 1 Notre Dame	No. 20	Notre Dame Stadium; Notre Dame, IN (rivalry)		L 7–38	58,154	
November 7		vs. Duke		Municipal Stadium; Baltimore, MD		T 0–0	15,000	
November 14		at Columbia		Baker Field; New York, NY		W 14–6	20,000	
November 28	1:15 p.m.	vs. No. 18 Army		Philadelphia Municipal Stadium; Philadelphia, PA (Army–Navy Game)	NBC	L 7–20	102,000	
^{†}Homecoming; Rankings from AP Poll released prior to the game; All times are in Eastern time; Source:

== Roster ==
1953 Navy Midshipmen football team roster
Players			Coaches
Offense: Pos. / # / Name / Class; FB / / Joe Gattuso / Jr	Defense: Pos. / # / Name / Class	Special teams: Pos. / # / Name / Class	Head coach: Eddie Erdelatz; Coordinators/assistant coaches Legend: (C) Team captain; (S) Suspended; (I) Ineligible; Injured; Redshirt
