= 1953 Louisville Cardinals football team =

American college football season

1953 Louisville Cardinals football
- Conference: Independent
- Record: 1–7
- Head coach: Frank Camp (8th season)
- Home stadium: Parkway Field

1953 Southern college football independents records
	Conf.			Overall
Team	W	L	T	W		L		T
Arkansas State		–		8	–	0	–	2
Delaware		–		7	–	1	–	0
Maryland State		–		7	–	1	–	0
Mississippi Southern		–		9	–	2	–	0
Navy		–		4	–	3	–	2
Memphis State		–		6	–	4	–	0
Florida State		–		5	–	5	–	0
Tampa		–		6	–	6	–	0
Miami (FL)		–		4	–	5	–	0
Sewanee		–		3	–	5	–	0
Marshall		–		2	–	5	–	2
Mississippi Vocational		–		2	–	4	–	0
Chattanooga		–		3	–	7	–	0
Louisville		–		1	–	7	–	0
Virginia		–		1	–	8	–	0

The 1953 Louisville Cardinals football team was an American football team that represented the University of Louisville as an independent during the 1953 college football season. In their eighth season under head coach Frank Camp, the Cardinals compiled a 1–7 record. Johnny Unitas was a player on the team.

== Schedule ==
Date	Opponent	Site	Result	Attendance	Source
September 19	at Murray State	Cutchin Stadium; Murray, KY	W 19–14		
October 3	at Florida State	Doak Campbell Stadium; Tallahassee, FL	L 0–59		
October 10	Xavier	Parkway Field; Louisville, KY	L 13–19	4,500	
October 17	at Dayton	UD Stadium; Dayton, OH	L 13–20	7,000	
October 24	at Tennessee	Shields–Watkins Field; Knoxville, TN	L 6–59	15,000	
October 30	at Chattanooga	Chamberlain Field; Chattanooga, TN	L 6–44	4,000	
November 7	Cincinnati	Parkway Field; Louisville, KY (rivalry)	L 0–41	3,500	
November 14	Eastern Kentucky^{†}	Parkway Field; Louisville, KY	L 13–20	2,500	
^{†}Homecoming
