= 1953 St. Olaf Oles football team =

American college football season

1953 St. Olaf Oles football

MWC champion
- Conference: Midwest Conference
- Record: 8–0 (6–0 MWC)
- Head coach: Ade Christenson (3rd season)

1953 Midwest Conference football standings
	Conf.					Overall
Team	W		L		T	W		L		T
St. Olaf $	6	–	0	–	0	8	–	0	–	0
Coe	5	–	0	–	1	5	–	2	–	1
Lawrence	5	–	1	–	1	6	–	1	–	1
Grinnell	4	–	3	–	0	4	–	4	–	0
Monmouth (IL)	4	–	3	–	0	5	–	3	–	0
Carleton	2	–	5	–	0	2	–	6	–	0
Knox	2	–	5	–	0	2	–	6	–	0
Ripon	1	–	5	–	0	1	–	6	–	0
Cornell (IA)	0	–	7	–	0	1	–	7	–	0
$ – Conference champion

The 1953 St. Olaf Oles football team was an American football team that represented St. Olaf College of Northfield, Minnesota as a member of the Midwest Conference (MWC) during the 1953 college football season. In their third season under head coach Ade Christenson, the Oles compiled a perfect 8–0 record (6–0 in conference games), won the MWC championship, shut out four opponents, and outscored opponents by a total of 302 to 46.

It was St. Olaf's first undefeated season since 1930. The Oles out-gained their opponents by a total of 3,403 yards to 1,237 yards.

== Schedule ==
Date	Opponent	Site	Result	Attendance	Source
September 19	Knox	Northfield, MN	W 28–19		
September 26	Wartburg*	Northfield, MN	W 35–14		
October 3	Bethel (MN)*	Northfield, MN	W 78–0		
October 17	Carleton	Northfield, NN	W 34–0		
October 24	Lawrence	Northfield, MN	W 35–13	7,000	
October 31	at Monmouth (IL)	Monmouth, IL	W 34–0		
November 7	at Ripon	Ripon, WI	W 58–0		
*Non-conference game
