= 1953 Arkansas State Indians football team =

American college football season

1953 Arkansas State Indians football

Tangerine Bowl, T 7–7 vs. East Texas State
- Conference: Independent
- Record: 8–0–2
- Head coach: Forrest England (8th season)
- Home stadium: Kays Stadium

1953 Southern college football independents records
	Conf.			Overall
Team	W	L	T	W		L		T
Arkansas State		–		8	–	0	–	2
Delaware		–		7	–	1	–	0
Maryland State		–		7	–	1	–	0
Mississippi Southern		–		9	–	2	–	0
Navy		–		4	–	3	–	2
Memphis State		–		6	–	4	–	0
Florida State		–		5	–	5	–	0
Tampa		–		6	–	6	–	0
Miami (FL)		–		4	–	5	–	0
Sewanee		–		3	–	5	–	0
Marshall		–		2	–	5	–	2
Mississippi Vocational		–		2	–	4	–	0
Chattanooga		–		3	–	7	–	0
Louisville		–		1	–	7	–	0
Virginia		–		1	–	8	–	0

The 1953 Arkansas State Indians football team was an American football team that represented Arkansas State College—now known as Arkansas State University—as an independent during the 1953 college football season. Led by Forrest England in his eighth and final year as head coach, the Indians compiled a record of 8–0–2. They were invited the Tangerine Bowl, where they tied East Texas State.

== Schedule ==
Date	Time	Opponent	Site	Result	Attendance	Source
September 26		Abilene Christian	Kays Stadium; Jonesboro, AR	W 19–7		
October 3		at Emporia State	Francis G. Welch Stadium; Emporia, KS	W 38–19		
October 10		Florence State	Kays Stadium; Jonesboro, AR	T 13–13		
October 17		Southwestern Louisiana	Kays Stadium; Jonesboro, AR	W 13–12		
October 24		at Lewis	Romeoville, IL	W 34–0		
October 31		Southern State (AR)^{†}	Kays Stadium; Jonesboro, AR	W 49–0		
November 7		at Memphis State	Crump Stadium; Memphis, TN (rivalry)	W 20–0	6,918	
November 14	8:00 p.m.	at Tennessee Tech	Overhill Field; Tennessee, TN	W 14–7		
November 21		Kearney State	Kays Stadium; Jonesboro, AR	W 32–0		
January 1		vs. East Texas State	Tangerine Bowl; Orlando, FL (Tangerine Bowl)	T 7–7	12,976	
^{†}Homecoming; All times are in Central time
