= 1953 Louisiana Tech Bulldogs football team =

American college football season

1953 Louisiana Tech Bulldogs football

GSC co-champion
- Conference: Gulf States Conference
- Record: 6–3 (5–1 GSC)
- Head coach: Joe Aillet (13th season)
- Captains: Billy Golden; Jimmy Sneed
- Home stadium: Tech Stadium

1953 Gulf States Conference football standings
	Conf.					Overall
Team	W		L		T	W		L		T
Northwestern State +	5	–	1	–	0	6	–	2	–	0
Louisiana Tech +	5	–	1	–	0	6	–	3	–	0
Southeastern Louisiana +	5	–	1	–	0	6	–	3	–	0
Southwestern Louisiana	2	–	4	–	0	4	–	7	–	0
McNeese State	2	–	4	–	0	3	–	6	–	0
Louisiana College	1	–	5	–	0	4	–	6	–	0
Northeast Louisiana State	1	–	5	–	0	1	–	9	–	0
+ – Conference co-champions

The 1953 Louisiana Tech Bulldogs football team was an American football team that represented the Louisiana Polytechnic Institute (now known as Louisiana Tech University) as a member of the Gulf States Conference during the 1953 college football season. In their thirteenth year under head coach Joe Aillet, the team compiled a 6–3 record.

== Schedule ==
Date	Opponent	Site	Result	Attendance	Source
September 19	at Louisiana College	Alumni Field; Pineville, LA	W 20–6		
September 26	Northeast Louisiana State*	Tech Stadium; Ruston, LA (rivalry)	W 61–6	7,000	
October 3	at Memphis State*	Crump Stadium; Memphis, TN	L 7–13		
October 17	Florida State*	Tech Stadium; Ruston, LA	W 32–21	6,000	
October 24	vs. Northwestern State	State Fair Stadium; Shreveport, LA (rivalry)	L 7–15	7,000	
October 31	Southwestern Louisiana^{†}	Tech Stadium; Ruston, LA (rivalry)	W 27–7	6,500	
November 7	at Southeastern Louisiana	Strawberry Stadium; Hammond, LA	W 12–0		
November 14	Mississippi Southern*	Tech Stadium; Ruston, LA (rivalry)	L 0–30	7,000	
November 27	at McNeese State	Killen Field; Lake Charles, LA	W 56–21	1,500	
*Non-conference game; ^{†}Homecoming
