= 1953 Drake Bulldogs football team =

American college football season

1953 Drake Bulldogs football
- Conference: Independent
- Record: 4–4
- Head coach: Warren Gaer (5th season)
- Home stadium: Drake Stadium

1953 Midwestern college football independents records
	Conf.			Overall
Team	W	L	T	W		L		T
No. 2 Notre Dame		–		9	–	0	–	1
Cincinnati		–		9	–	1	–	0
Carthage		–		8	–	1	–	0
Youngstown		–		7	–	1	–	0
John Carroll		–		7	–	2	–	0
Washington University		–		7	–	2	–	0
Rose Poly		–		6	–	2	–	0
Wabash		–		6	–	2	–	1
Marquette		–		6	–	3	–	1
Baldwin–Wallace		–		4	–	4	–	0
Drake		–		4	–	4	–	0
Wayne		–		3	–	4	–	1
Dayton		–		3	–	5	–	1
Michigan Tech		–		2	–	5	–	0
Xavier		–		2	–	7	–	1
Rankings from AP Poll

The 1953 Drake Bulldogs football team was an American football team that represented Drake University as an independent during the 1953 college football season. Led by fifth-year head coach Warren Gaer, the Bulldogs compiled a record of 4–4.

== Schedule ==
Date	Time	Opponent	Site	Result	Attendance	Source
September 19	8:00 p.m.	at Kansas State	Memorial Stadium; Manhattan, KS	L 0–50	11,000	
September 26		at Denver	DU Stadium; Denver, CO	L 14–33	7,055	
October 3		South Dakota	Drake Stadium; Des Moines, IA	W 18–0		
October 17	8:00 p.m.	at Wichita	Veterans Field; Wichita, KS	L 0–27	8,592	
October 24	2:00 p.m.	Iowa State^{†}	Drake Stadium; Des Moines, IA	W 12–7	7,500	
October 31		at Bradley	Peoria Stadium; Peoria, IL	W 21–13	2,500	
November 6	8:00 p.m.	Wayne	Drake Stadium; Des Moines, IA	L 19–25		
November 13	8:00 p.m.	Iowa State Teachers	Drake Stadium; Des Moines, IA	W 27–20	4,000	
^{†}Homecoming; All times are in Central time
