= 1954 Troy State Red Wave football team =

American college football season

1954 Troy State Red Wave football
- Conference: Alabama Intercollegiate Conference
- Record: 2–5–1 (1–2 AIC)
- Head coach: Jim Grantham (4th season)
- Home stadium: Veterans Memorial Stadium

The 1954 Troy State Red Wave football team represented Troy State Teachers College (now known as Troy University) as a member of the Alabama Intercollegiate Conference (AIC) during the 1954 college football season. Led by fourth-year head coach Jim Grantham, the Red Wave compiled an overall record of 2–5–1, with a mark of 1–2 in conference play.

== Schedule ==
Date	Opponent	Site	Result	Attendance	Source
September 18	Livingston State	Veterans Memorial Stadium; Troy, AL	W 26–6		
September 25	vs. South Georgia*	Memorial Stadium; Columbus, GA	W 19–0	1,000	
October 2	at Stetson*	DeLand Municipal Stadium; DeLand, FL	L 14–18		
October 9	Delta State*	Veterans Memorial Stadium; Troy, AL	L 12–26		
October 16	at Jacksonville State	College Bowl; Jacksonville, AL (rivalry)	L 7–38	6,000	
October 22	at Tampa*	Phillips Field; Tampa, FL	L 0–26		
November 6	at Florence State	Municipal Stadium; Florence, AL	L 6–28		
November 13	Newberry*	Veterans Memorial Stadium; Troy, AL	T 14–14		
*Non-conference game
