= 1953 Tampa Spartans football team =

American college football season

1953 Tampa Spartans football
- Conference: Independent
- Record: 6–6
- Head coach: Marcelino Huerta (2nd season)
- Home stadium: Phillips Field

1953 Southern college football independents records
	Conf.			Overall
Team	W	L	T	W		L		T
Arkansas State		–		8	–	0	–	2
Delaware		–		7	–	1	–	0
Maryland State		–		7	–	1	–	0
Mississippi Southern		–		9	–	2	–	0
Navy		–		4	–	3	–	2
Memphis State		–		6	–	4	–	0
Florida State		–		5	–	5	–	0
Tampa		–		6	–	6	–	0
Miami (FL)		–		4	–	5	–	0
Sewanee		–		3	–	5	–	0
Marshall		–		2	–	5	–	2
Mississippi Vocational		–		2	–	4	–	0
Chattanooga		–		3	–	7	–	0
Louisville		–		1	–	7	–	0
Virginia		–		1	–	8	–	0

The 1953 Tampa Spartans football team represented the University of Tampa in the 1953 college football season. It was the Spartans' 17th season. The team was led by head coach Marcelino Huerta, in his second year, and played their home games at Phillips Field in Tampa, Florida. They finished with a record of six wins and six losses (6–6).

== Schedule ==
Date	Opponent	Site	Result	Attendance	Source
September 18	vs. Troy State	Memorial Stadium; Columbus, GA	W 21–7	6,000	
September 25	South Georgia	Phillips Field; Tampa, FL	W 33–0	5,000	
October 3	at Mississippi Southern	Faulkner Field; Hattiesburg, MS	L 6–42	7,000	
October 10	Jacksonville NAS	Phillips Field; Tampa, FL	W 26–6		
October 17	vs. Stetson	Tangerine Bowl; Orlando, FL	L 7–14	7,000	
October 24	at McNeese State	Killen Field; Lake Charles, LA	W 25–7	5,000	
October 30	Sam Houston State	Phillips Field; Tampa, FL	L 6–26	4,500	
November 7	East Carolina	Phillips Field; Tampa, FL	W 18–13		
November 14	Arkansas Tech	Phillips Field; Tampa, FL	W 26–20		
November 21	Appalachian State^{†}	Phillips Field; Tampa, FL	L 12–35	5,500	
November 28	Delta State	Phillips Field; Tampa, FL	L 6–13		
December 5	Florida State	Phillips Field; Tampa, FL	L 6–41		
^{†}Homecoming
