= 1953 Marquette Hilltoppers football team =

American college football season

1953 Marquette Hilltoppers football
- Conference: Independent
- Record: 6–3–1
- Head coach: Lisle Blackbourn (4th season)
- Home stadium: Marquette Stadium

1953 Midwestern college football independents records
	Conf.			Overall
Team	W	L	T	W		L		T
No. 2 Notre Dame		–		9	–	0	–	1
Cincinnati		–		9	–	1	–	0
Carthage		–		8	–	1	–	0
Youngstown		–		7	–	1	–	0
John Carroll		–		7	–	2	–	0
Washington University		–		7	–	2	–	0
Rose Poly		–		6	–	2	–	0
Wabash		–		6	–	2	–	1
Marquette		–		6	–	3	–	1
Baldwin–Wallace		–		4	–	4	–	0
Drake		–		4	–	4	–	0
Wayne		–		3	–	4	–	1
Dayton		–		3	–	5	–	1
Michigan Tech		–		2	–	5	–	0
Xavier		–		2	–	7	–	1
Rankings from AP Poll

The 1953 Marquette Hilltoppers football team represented Marquette University as an independent during the 1953 college football season. Led by fourth-year head coach Lisle Blackbourn, the Hilltoppers compiled a 6–3–1 record and outscored their opponents 196 to 108. The team played home games at Marquette Stadium, west of campus in Milwaukee.

In January 1954, Blackbourn departed for the Green Bay Packers of the National Football League (NFL).

== Schedule ==
Date	Time	Opponent	Site	Result	Attendance	Source
September 19		South Dakota State	Marquette Stadium; Milwaukee, WI	W 46–13	13,500	
September 26		Cincinnati	Marquette Stadium; Milwaukee, WI	W 31–7	15,500	
October 3		at No. 16 Wisconsin	Camp Randall Stadium; Madison, WI	L 11–13	51,363	
October 10		at Indiana	Memorial Stadium; Bloomington, IN	L 20–21	27,000–27,594	
October 17		at Arizona	Arizona Stadium; Tucson, AZ	W 14–0	20,000	
October 24		Pacific (CA)	Marquette Stadium; Milwaukee, WI	T 20–20	19,500	
October 30	7:30 p.m.	at Boston University	Braves Field; Boston, MA	W 7–6	19,730	
November 7		Detroit	Marquette Stadium; Milwaukee, WI	W 19–0	13,500	
November 14		at Holy Cross	Fitton Field; Worcester, MA	W 13–7	8,000	
November 21		at No. 3 Michigan State	Macklin Stadium; East Lansing, MI	L 15–21	42,170	
Rankings from AP Poll released prior to the game; All times are in Central time
