= 1953 Platteville State Pioneers football team =

American college football season

1953 Platteville State Pioneers football

WSCC co-champion
- Conference: Wisconsin State College Conference
- Record: 6–0 (4–0 WSCC)
- Head coach: Lester Leitl (24th season)
- Captain: Stan Zenz

1953 Wisconsin State College Conference football standings
	Conf.					Overall
Team	W		L		T	W		L		T
La Crosse State +	5	–	0	–	0	9	–	0	–	1
Platteville State +	4	–	0	–	0	6	–	0	–	0
River Falls State	3	–	1	–	0	5	–	2	–	0
Stevens Point State	4	–	2	–	0	5	–	3	–	0
Eau Claire State	4	–	3	–	0	5	–	3	–	0
Whitewater State	2	–	3	–	0	2	–	4	–	0
Milwaukee State	2	–	3	–	0	2	–	6	–	0
Superior State	1	–	3	–	0	3	–	4	–	0
Stout Institute	0	–	5	–	0	1	–	7	–	0
Oshkosh State	0	–	5	–	0	0	–	6	–	0
+ – Conference co-champions

The 1953 Platteville State Pioneers football team was an American football team that represented Wisconsin State College at Platteville as a member of the Wisconsin State College Conference (WSCC) during the 1953 college football season. In their 24th year under head coach Lester Leitl, the Pioneers compiled a 6–0 record (4–0 against conference opponents), tied with La Crosse State for the WSCC championship, and outscored opponents by a total of 101 to 14. Stan Zenz was the team captain. The 1953 season was the Platteville's first perfect season in program history.

== Schedule ==
Date	Opponent	Site	Result	Attendance	Source
September 26	Whitewater State	Platteville, WI	W 13–0		
October 3	Dubuque*	Platteville, WI	W 20–0		
October 10	at Oshkosh State	Oshkosh, WI	W 19–2		
October 17	Milwaukee State^{†}	Plattevile, WI	W 6–0		
October 24	at Stevens Point State	Stevens Point, WI	W 19–12		
October 31	at Wartburg*	Waverly, IA	W 24–0		
*Non-conference game; ^{†}Homecoming
