= 1953 McNeese State Cowboys football team =

American college football season

1953 McNeese State Cowboys football
- Conference: Gulf States Conference
- Record: 3–7 (2–4 GSC)
- Head coach: Albert I. Ratcliff (8th season)
- Home stadium: Killen Field

1953 Gulf States Conference football standings
	Conf.					Overall
Team	W		L		T	W		L		T
Northwestern State +	5	–	1	–	0	6	–	2	–	0
Louisiana Tech +	5	–	1	–	0	6	–	3	–	0
Southeastern Louisiana +	5	–	1	–	0	6	–	3	–	0
Southwestern Louisiana	2	–	4	–	0	4	–	7	–	0
McNeese State	2	–	4	–	0	3	–	6	–	0
Louisiana College	1	–	5	–	0	4	–	6	–	0
Northeast Louisiana State	1	–	5	–	0	1	–	9	–	0
+ – Conference co-champions

The 1953 McNeese State Cowboys football team was an American football team that represented McNeese State College (now known as McNeese State University) as a member of the Gulf States Conference (GSC) during the 1953 college football season. In their eighth year under head coach Albert I. Ratcliff, the team compiled an overall record of 3–7 with a mark of 2–4 in conference play, tying for fourth place in the GSC.

== Schedule ==
Date	Opponent	Site	Result	Attendance	Source
September 19	Howard Payne*	Killen Field; Lake Charles, LA	W 34–26	4,000	
September 26	at Stephen F. Austin*	Memorial Stadium; Nacogdoches, TX	L 14–16	4,500	
October 3	Northwestern State	Killen Field; Lake Charles, LA	L 6–20	5,000	
October 10	at Northeast Louisiana State	Brown Stadium; Monroe, LA	W 38–6	2,200	
October 17	at Louisiana College	Alumni Field; Pineville, LA	W 33–9	8,000	
October 24	Tampa*	Killen Field; Lake Charles, LA	L 7–25	5,000	
October 31	Trinity (TX)*	Killen Field; Lake Charles, LA	L 0–20	1,500	
November 14	Southeastern Louisiana	Killen Field; Lake Charles, LA	L 0–20	3,200	
November 21	at Southwestern Louisiana	McNaspy Stadium; Lafayette, LA (rivalry)	L 13–47	5,500	
November 27	Louisiana Tech	Killen Field; Lake Charles, LA	L 21–56	1,500	
*Non-conference game
