= 1953 Southwestern Louisiana Bulldogs football team =

American college football season

1953 Southwestern Louisiana Bulldogs football
- Conference: Gulf States Conference
- Record: 4–7 (2–4 GSC)
- Head coach: Raymond Didier (3rd season)
- Home stadium: McNaspy Stadium

1953 Gulf States Conference football standings
	Conf.					Overall
Team	W		L		T	W		L		T
Northwestern State +	5	–	1	–	0	6	–	2	–	0
Louisiana Tech +	5	–	1	–	0	6	–	3	–	0
Southeastern Louisiana +	5	–	1	–	0	6	–	3	–	0
Southwestern Louisiana	2	–	4	–	0	4	–	7	–	0
McNeese State	2	–	4	–	0	3	–	6	–	0
Louisiana College	1	–	5	–	0	4	–	6	–	0
Northeast Louisiana State	1	–	5	–	0	1	–	9	–	0
+ – Conference co-champions

The 1953 Southwestern Louisiana Bulldogs football team was an American football team that represented the Southwestern Louisiana Institute of Liberal and Technical Learning (now known as the University of Louisiana at Lafayette) in the Gulf States Conference during the 1953 college football season. In their third year under head coach Raymond Didier, the team compiled a 4–7 record.

== Schedule ==
Date	Opponent	Site	Result	Attendance	Source
September 19	at Lamar Tech*	Greenie Stadium; Beaumont, TX (rivalry)	W 22–13		
September 26	at Southeastern Louisiana	Strawberry Stadium; Hammond, LA (rivalry)	L 13–39		
October 3	East Texas State*	McNaspy Stadium; Lafayette, LA	L 7–41	7,500	
October 10	No. 20 Mississippi Southern*	McNaspy Stadium; Lafayette, LA	L 14–41		
October 17	at Arkansas State*	Kays Stadium; Jonesboro, AR	L 12–13	3,000	
October 24	at Stephen F. Austin*	Memorial Stadium; Nacogdoches, TX	W 14–7		
October 31	at Louisiana Tech	Tech Stadium; Ruston, LA (rivalry)	L 7–27	6,500	
November 7	Louisiana College^{†}	McNaspy Stadium; Lafayette, LA	W 19–6	750	
November 14	Northwestern State	McNaspy Stadium; Lafayette, LA	L 7–12		
November 21	McNeese State	McNaspy Stadium; Lafayette, LA (rivalry)	W 47–13	5,500	
November 28	at Northeast Louisiana State	Brown Stadium; Monroe, LA (rivalry)	L 6–35		
*Non-conference game; ^{†}Homecoming; Rankings from Coaches' Poll released prior to the game
