= 1953 Florida State Seminoles football team =

American college football season

1953 Florida State Seminoles football
- Conference: Independent
- Record: 5–5
- Head coach: Tom Nugent (1st season)
- Captains: Steve Kalenich; Bobby Fiveash
- Home stadium: Doak Campbell Stadium

1953 Southern college football independents records
	Conf.			Overall
Team	W	L	T	W		L		T
Arkansas State		–		8	–	0	–	2
Delaware		–		7	–	1	–	0
Maryland State		–		7	–	1	–	0
Mississippi Southern		–		9	–	2	–	0
Navy		–		4	–	3	–	2
Memphis State		–		6	–	4	–	0
Florida State		–		5	–	5	–	0
Tampa		–		6	–	6	–	0
Miami (FL)		–		4	–	5	–	0
Sewanee		–		3	–	5	–	0
Marshall		–		2	–	5	–	2
Mississippi Vocational		–		2	–	4	–	0
Chattanooga		–		3	–	7	–	0
Louisville		–		1	–	7	–	0
Virginia		–		1	–	8	–	0

The 1953 Florida State Seminoles football team represented Florida State University as an independent during the 1953 college football season. In 1953, Tom Nugent, the creator of the I formation, became head coach and led the team to a 5–5 record. He was coach for six years, and compiled a 34–28–1 record.

== Schedule ==
Date	Opponent	Site	Result	Attendance	Source
September 25	at Miami (FL)	Burdine Stadium; Miami, FL (rivalry)	L 0–27	26,692	
October 3	Louisville	Doak Campbell Stadium; Tallahassee, FL	W 59–0		
October 10	Abilene Christian	Doak Campbell Stadium; Tallahassee, FL	L 7–20	11,815	
October 17	at Louisiana Tech	Tech Stadium; Ruston, LA	L 21–32	6,000	
October 31	VMI	Doak Campbell Stadium; Tallahassee, FL	W 12–7	14,000	
November 7	at Mississippi Southern	Faulkner Field; Hattiesburg, MS	L 0–21	11,000	
November 14	Furman	Doak Campbell Stadium; Tallahassee, FL	L 7–14		
November 21	Stetson^{†}	Doak Campbell Stadium; Tallahassee, FL	W 13–6	10,952	
November 28	NC State	Doak Campbell Stadium; Tallahassee, FL	W 23–13	5,000	
December 5	at Tampa	Phillips Field; Tampa, FL	W 41–6		
^{†}Homecoming
