= 1953 Miami Hurricanes football team =

American college football season

1953 Miami Hurricanes football
- Conference: Independent
- Record: 4–5
- Head coach: Andy Gustafson (6th season)
- Home stadium: Burdine Stadium

1953 Southern college football independents records
	Conf.			Overall
Team	W	L	T	W		L		T
Arkansas State		–		8	–	0	–	2
Delaware		–		7	–	1	–	0
Maryland State		–		7	–	1	–	0
Mississippi Southern		–		9	–	2	–	0
Navy		–		4	–	3	–	2
Memphis State		–		6	–	4	–	0
Florida State		–		5	–	5	–	0
Tampa		–		6	–	6	–	0
Miami (FL)		–		4	–	5	–	0
Sewanee		–		3	–	5	–	0
Marshall		–		2	–	5	–	2
Mississippi Vocational		–		2	–	4	–	0
Chattanooga		–		3	–	7	–	0
Louisville		–		1	–	7	–	0
Virginia		–		1	–	8	–	0

The 1953 Miami Hurricanes football team represented the University of Miami as an independent during the 1953 college football season. Led by sixth-year head coach Andy Gustafson, the Hurricanes played their home games at Burdine Stadium in Miami, Florida. Miami finished the season 4–5.

== Schedule ==
Date	Opponent	Site	Result	Attendance	Source
September 25	Florida State	Burdine Stadium; Miami, FL (rivalry)	W 27–0	26,692	
October 2	No. 10 Baylor	Burdine Stadium; Miami, FL	L 13–21	28,042	
October 9	Clemson	Burdine Stadium; Miami, FL	W 39–7	27,300–27,324	
October 17	at Nebraska	Memorial Stadium; Lincoln, NE (rivalry)	L 16–20	39,000	
October 23	No. 3 Maryland	Burdine Stadium; Miami, FL	L 0–30	42,157	
October 31	at Fordham	Polo Grounds; New York, NY	L 0–20	20,308	
November 6	No. 15 Auburn	Burdine Stadium; Miami, FL	L 20–29	26,472	
November 13	VPI	Burdine Stadium; Miami, FL (rivalry)	W 26–0	17,000–17,105	
November 27	Florida	Burdine Stadium; Miami, FL (rivalry)	W 14–0	55,530–65,000	
Rankings from AP Poll released prior to the game
