= 1953 Virginia Cavaliers football team =

American college football season

1953 Virginia Cavaliers football
- Conference: Independent
- Record: 1–8
- Head coach: Ned McDonald (1st season)
- Captains: Robert Potter; Joseph Mehalick
- Home stadium: Scott Stadium

1953 Southern college football independents records
	Conf.			Overall
Team	W	L	T	W		L		T
Arkansas State		–		8	–	0	–	2
Delaware		–		7	–	1	–	0
Maryland State		–		7	–	1	–	0
Mississippi Southern		–		9	–	2	–	0
Navy		–		4	–	3	–	2
Memphis State		–		6	–	4	–	0
Florida State		–		5	–	5	–	0
Tampa		–		6	–	6	–	0
Miami (FL)		–		4	–	5	–	0
Sewanee		–		3	–	5	–	0
Marshall		–		2	–	5	–	2
Chattanooga		–		3	–	7	–	0
Louisville		–		1	–	7	–	0
Virginia		–		1	–	8	–	0

The 1953 Virginia Cavaliers football team represented the University of Virginia during the 1953 college football season. The Cavaliers were led by first-year head coach Ned McDonald and played their home games at Scott Stadium in Charlottesville, Virginia. The team compiled a record of 1–8. This was the last season in which Virginia competed as an independent, as they join the newly formed Atlantic Coast Conference (ACC) the following year.

== Schedule ==
Date	Opponent	Site	Result	Attendance	Source
September 26	VPI	Scott Stadium; Charlottesville, VA (rivalry)	L 6–20	20,000	
October 3	South Carolina	Scott Stadium; Charlottesville, VA	L 0–19	12,000	
October 10	vs. George Washington	George Washington HS Stadium; Alexandria, VA	W 24–20	9,500	
October 17	VMI^{†}	Scott Stadium; Charlottesville, VA	L 6–21	18,000	
October 24	at Vanderbilt	Dudley Field; Nashville, TN	L 13–28	16,000	
October 31	vs. No. 13 Duke	Foreman Field; Norfolk, VA (Oyster Bowl)	L 6–48	25,000	
November 7	Pittsburgh	Scott Stadium; Charlottesville, VA	L 0–26	13,000	
November 14	at Washington and Lee	Wilson Field; Lexington, VA	L 13–27	10,000	
November 21	North Carolina	Scott Stadium; Charlottesville, VA (South's Oldest Rivalry)	L 7–33	13,000	
^{†}Homecoming; Rankings from AP Poll released prior to the game
