= 1953 Memphis State Tigers football team =

American college football season

1953 Memphis State Tigers football
- Conference: Independent
- Record: 6–4
- Head coach: Ralph Hatley (7th season)
- Home stadium: Crump Stadium

1953 Southern college football independents records
	Conf.			Overall
Team	W	L	T	W		L		T
Arkansas State		–		8	–	0	–	2
Delaware		–		7	–	1	–	0
Maryland State		–		7	–	1	–	0
Mississippi Southern		–		9	–	2	–	0
Navy		–		4	–	3	–	2
Memphis State		–		6	–	4	–	0
Florida State		–		5	–	5	–	0
Tampa		–		6	–	6	–	0
Miami (FL)		–		4	–	5	–	0
Sewanee		–		3	–	5	–	0
Marshall		–		2	–	5	–	2
Chattanooga		–		3	–	7	–	0
Louisville		–		1	–	7	–	0
Virginia		–		1	–	8	–	0

The 1953 Memphis State Tigers football team was an American football team that represented Memphis State College (now known as the University of Memphis) as an independent during the 1953 college football season. In their seventh season under head coach Ralph Hatley, Memphis State compiled a 6–4 record.

== Schedule ==
Date	Opponent	Site	Result	Attendance	Source
September 19	Mississippi State	Crump Stadium; Memphis, TN	L 6–34		
September 25	at Chattanooga	Chamberlain Field; Chattanooga, TN	W 7–6	5,000	
October 3	Louisiana Tech	Crump Stadium; Memphis, TN	W 13–7		
October 10	at Murray State	Murray, KY	W 20–0		
October 17	Tennessee Tech	Crump Stadium; Memphis, TN	W 14–7		
October 24	at Middle Tennessee	Horace Jones Field; Murfreesboro, TN	L 20–26		
October 31	No. 19 Mississippi Southern	Crump Stadium; Memphis, TN (rivalry)	W 27–13		
November 7	Arkansas State^{†}	Crump Stadium; Memphis, TN (rivalry)	L 0–20	6,918	
November 14	at No. 13 Kentucky	McLean Stadium; Lexington, KY	L 7–20	20,000	
November 22	at Southeastern Louisiana	Strawberry Stadium; Hammond, LA	W 21–7		
^{†}Homecoming; Rankings from AP Poll released prior to the game
