= 1953 Chattanooga Moccasins football team =

American college football season

1953 Chattanooga Moccasins football
- Conference: Independent
- Record: 3–7
- Head coach: Scrappy Moore (23rd season)
- Captain: Tom Drake
- Home stadium: Chamberlain Field

1953 Southern college football independents records
| | Conf. | | | Overall |
| Team | W | L | T | W | | L | | T |
|---|---|---|---|---|---|---|---|---|
| Arkansas State | | – | | 8 | – | 0 | – | 2 |
| Delaware | | – | | 7 | – | 1 | – | 0 |
| Maryland State | | – | | 7 | – | 1 | – | 0 |
| Mississippi Southern | | – | | 9 | – | 2 | – | 0 |
| Navy | | – | | 4 | – | 3 | – | 2 |
| Memphis State | | – | | 6 | – | 4 | – | 0 |
| Florida State | | – | | 5 | – | 5 | – | 0 |
| Tampa | | – | | 6 | – | 6 | – | 0 |
| Miami (FL) | | – | | 4 | – | 5 | – | 0 |
| Sewanee | | – | | 3 | – | 5 | – | 0 |
| Marshall | | – | | 2 | – | 5 | – | 2 |
| Chattanooga | | – | | 3 | – | 7 | – | 0 |
| Louisville | | – | | 1 | – | 7 | – | 0 |
| Virginia | | – | | 1 | – | 8 | – | 0 |

The 1953 Chattanooga Moccasins football team was an American football team that represented the University of Chattanooga (now known as the University of Tennessee at Chattanooga) during the 1953 college football season. In their 23rd year under head coach Scrappy Moore, the team compiled a 3–7 record.

== Schedule ==
| Date | Opponent | Site | Result | Attendance | Source |
|---|---|---|---|---|---|
| September 19 | at Ole Miss | Mississippi Veterans Memorial Stadium; Jackson, MS | L 6–39 | 18,000 | |
| September 25 | Memphis State | Chamberlain Field; Chattanooga, TN | L 6–7 | 5,000 | |
| October 2 | Jacksonville State | Chamberlain Field; Chattanooga, TN | W 39–0 | | |
| October 10 | at Tennessee | Shields–Watkins Field; Knoxville, TN | L 7–40 | 15,000 | |
| October 16 | East Texas State | Chamberlain Field; Chattanooga, TN | L 7–19 | | |
| October 24 | at Dayton | University of Dayton Stadium; Dayton, OH | L 6–19 | | |
| October 30 | Louisville | Chamberlain Field; Chattanooga, TN | W 44–6 | 4,000 | |
| November 7 | at No. 20 Alabama | Denny Stadium; Tuscaloosa, AL | L 14–21 | 14,000 | |
| November 13 | Xavier | Chamberlain Field; Chattanooga, TN | W 16–6 | 6,000 | |
| November 26 | Mississippi Southern | Chamberlain Field; Chattanooga, TN | L 19–33 | 9,000 | |
Rankings from AP Poll released prior to the game
