= 1953 Mississippi Southern Southerners football team =

American college football season

1953 Mississippi Southern Southerners football

Sun Bowl, L 14–37 vs. Texas Western
- Conference: Independent
- Record: 9–2
- Head coach: Thad Vann (4th season)
- Home stadium: Faulkner Field

1953 Southern college football independents records
	Conf.			Overall
Team	W	L	T	W		L		T
Arkansas State		–		8	–	0	–	2
Delaware		–		7	–	1	–	0
Maryland State		–		7	–	1	–	0
Mississippi Southern		–		9	–	2	–	0
Navy		–		4	–	3	–	2
Memphis State		–		6	–	4	–	0
Florida State		–		5	–	5	–	0
Tampa		–		6	–	6	–	0
Miami (FL)		–		4	–	5	–	0
Sewanee		–		3	–	5	–	0
Marshall		–		2	–	5	–	2
Chattanooga		–		3	–	7	–	0
Louisville		–		1	–	7	–	0
Virginia		–		1	–	8	–	0

The 1953 Mississippi Southern Southerners football team represented Mississippi Southern College (now known as the University of Southern Mississippi) in the 1953 college football season. The team played in the Sun Bowl against Texas Western. The Southerners compiled a 9–2 record, and outscored their opponents 280 to 122. They were ranked for three weeks in the AP poll, and defeated a top 5 Alabama team that won the SEC to begin the season.

== Schedule ==
Date	Opponent	Rank	Site	Result	Attendance	Source
September 18	at No. 5 Alabama		Cramton Bowl; Montgomery, AL	W 25–19	14,500	
September 26	Parris Island Marines		Faulkner Field; Hattiesburg, MS	W 40–0		
October 3	Tampa		Faulkner Field; Hattiesburg, MS	W 42–6	7,000	
October 10	at Southwestern Louisiana	No. 20	McNaspy Stadium; Lafayette, LA	W 41–14		
October 17	Southeastern Louisiana	No. 18	Faulkner Field; Hattiesburg, MS	W 7–0		
October 31	at Memphis State	No. 19	Crump Stadium; Memphis, TN	L 13–27		
November 7	Florida State^{†}		Faulkner Field; Hattiesburg, MS	W 21–0	11,000	
November 14	at Louisiana Tech		Tech Stadium; Ruston, LA (Rivalry in Dixie)	W 30–0	7,000	
November 21	Georgia		Mississippi Veterans Memorial Stadium; Jackson, MS	W 14–0	24,000	
November 26	at Chattanooga		Chamberlain Field; Chattanooga, TN	W 33–19	7,000	
January 1, 1954	vs. Texas Western		Kidd Field; El Paso, TX (Sun Bowl)	L 14–37	12,000	
^{†}Homecoming; Rankings from AP Poll released prior to the game
