= 1950 Salad Bowl =

Xavier Musketeers	Arizona State Sun Devils
(9–1)	(7–2)
33	21
Head coach: Ed Kluska	Head coach: Ed Doherty
	1	2	3	4	Total
Xavier	0	14	13	6	33
Arizona State	7	0	7	7	21
- Date: January 2, 1950
- Season: 1949
- Stadium: Montgomery Stadium
- Location: Phoenix, Arizona
- Attendance: 20,000

The 1950 Salad Bowl was a college football bowl game played between Xavier University and Arizona State College at Montgomery Stadium in Phoenix, Arizona. Xavier entered the game with a 9–1 record, best in the state of Ohio, and favored over 7–2 Arizona State, which had the best record in Arizona. Xavier defeated Arizona State 33-21 before 20,000 fans, then the most fans who had ever watched a football game (of any level) in the state of Arizona. This marked Xavier's first and only appearance in a post-season bowl game.

== Background ==
The Phoenix Kiwanis Club, who sponsored the Salad Bowl, selected Arizona State as the home team after the Sun Devils defeated the Arizona Wildcats, 34–7. Arizona State had not beaten Arizona since 1931. At the end of November the organizers invited Xavier, whose 9–1 record was best in Ohio, to face Arizona State. Other teams considered included the College of the Pacific, Wyoming and Colorado A&M.

== Game summary ==
- Arizona State – White 1 pass from Coleman (Fuller kick)
- Xavier – Wilke touchdown (Keefe kick)
- Xavier – O’Brien touchdown (Keefe kick)
- Arizona State – Coleman 1 run (Fuller kick)
- Xavier – McQuade touchdown (kick failed)
- Xavier – Finnell touchdown (Keefe kick)
- Arizona State – White 5 run (Fuller kick)
- Xavier – Crowe 1 run (kick failed)

During the game Xavier benefited from mistakes by Arizona State, including three touchdown drives which began with Arizona State turnovers. On the other side of the ball, Arizona State's barefoot kicker Bobby Fuller kicked all three extra points. The following season Fuller would make 48 of 51 attempts, a record which stood for 20 years.

The pre-game parade featured Jacque Mercer, the 1949 Miss America and a native of Litchfield Park, Arizona. Her presence came from a special connection: Robert Hannelly, who was president of both the Phoenix Kiwanis Club and Phoenix College, which Mercer attended.

Although a number of modern sources state that the game took place on New Year's Day, contemporary newspaper accounts confirm that the game was played, along with most bowl games that year, on January 2. No bowl games were played on January 1, 1950, because it fell on a Sunday.
