= Joseph A. Meyer =

American football, basketball, and baseball coach

Biographical details
- Born: December 10, 1893
- Died: July 14, 1970 (aged 76); Cincinnati, Ohio, U.S.

Playing career

Basketball
- 1916–1917: Notre Dame

Baseball
- 1914–1917: Notre Dame
- 1919: Columbia Comers
- Position: First baseman (baseball)

Coaching career (HC unless noted)

Football
- 1920–1935: Xavier
- 1938–1942: Cincinnati

Basketball
- 1920–1933: Xavier

Baseball
- 1926, 1929: Xavier
- 1941–1943: Cincinnati

Administrative career (AD unless noted)
- 1920–1935: Xavier

Head coaching record
- Overall: 94–52 (basketball); 15–14 (baseball) (Note: Records for 1941 are unavailable.)

Joseph A. Meyer (December 10, 1893 – July 14, 1970) was an American football, basketball, and baseball coach. He served as the head football coach at Xavier University from 1920 to 1935 and at the University of Cincinnati from 1938 to 1942. Meyer was also the head basketball coach at Xavier from 1920 to 1933, tallying a mark of 94–52. In addition, he was the head baseball coach at Xavier in 1926 and 1929 and at Cincinnati in 1942, amassing a career college baseball record of 14–10. Meyer played basketball and baseball at the University of Notre Dame. He died at the age of 75 on July 14, 1970, at his home in Cincinnati, Ohio.

== Head coaching record ==
=== Football ===
Year	Team	Overall	Conference	Standing	Bowl/playoffs
St. Xavier Saints (Independent) (1920)
1920	St. Xavier	7–1			
St. Xavier / Xavier Musketeers (Ohio Athletic Conference) (1921–1934)
1921	St. Xavier	6–2	1–0	2nd	
1922	St. Xavier	6–2–1	2–0	3rd	
1923	St. Xavier	4–4	1–2	15th	
1924	St. Xavier	2–5–1	1–1–1	T–10th	
1925	St. Xavier	5–2–1	3–1–1	5th	
1926	St. Xavier	9–1	1–0	3rd	
1927	St. Xavier	8–1–1	1–0	NA	
1928	St. Xavier	7–2	0–1	T–12th	
1929	St. Xavier	6–4	0–2	T–16th	
1930	Xavier	6–4	2–1	4th	
1931	Xavier	4–3–1	1–0–1	T–6th	
1932	Xavier	6–2–1	0–1	20th	
1933	Xavier	6–2–1	1–0	NA	
1934	Xavier	6–2–1	2–0	T–1st	
Xavier Musketeers (Independent) (1935)
1935	Xavier	1–2 (Note: Meyer resigned after the first three games of the 1935 season. He was replaced by Clem Crowe, who led the team for the final six games. Xavier finished the year with an overall record of 6–3.)			
Xavier:		89–39–8	16–9–3		
Cincinnati Bearcats (Independent) (1938–1942)
1938	Cincinnati	4–5			
1939	Cincinnati	4–3–2			
1940	Cincinnati	5–3–1			
1941	Cincinnati	6–3			
1942	Cincinnati	8–2			
Cincinnati:		27–16–3			
Total:		116–55–11			

=== Baseball ===
Record table
Season	Team	Overall	Conference	Standing	Postseason
Xavier Musketeers (1926)
1926	Xavier	8–2			
Xavier:		8–2			
Cincinnati Bearcats (1941–1943)
1941	Cincinnati	N/A			
1942	Cincinnati	6–9			
1943	Cincinnati	1–3			
Cincinnati:		7–12			
Total:		15–14			
