= 1953 Washington University Bears football team =

American college football season

1953 Washington University Bears football
- Conference: Independent
- Record: 7–2
- Head coach: Carl Snavely (1st season)
- Home stadium: Francis Field

1953 Midwestern college football independents records
	Conf.			Overall
Team	W	L	T	W		L		T
No. 2 Notre Dame		–		9	–	0	–	1
Cincinnati		–		9	–	1	–	0
Carthage		–		8	–	1	–	0
Youngstown		–		7	–	1	–	0
John Carroll		–		7	–	2	–	0
Washington University		–		7	–	2	–	0
Rose Poly		–		6	–	2	–	0
Wabash		–		6	–	2	–	1
Marquette		–		6	–	3	–	1
Baldwin–Wallace		–		4	–	4	–	0
Drake		–		4	–	4	–	0
Wayne		–		3	–	4	–	1
Dayton		–		3	–	5	–	1
Michigan Tech		–		2	–	5	–	0
Xavier		–		2	–	7	–	1
Rankings from AP Poll

The 1953 Washington University Bears football team represented Washington University in St. Louis as an independent during the 1953 college football season. Led by first-year head coach Carl Snavely, the Bears compiled a record of 7–2. Washington University played home games at Francis Field in St. Louis.

== Schedule ==
Date	Time	Opponent	Site	Result	Attendance	Source
September 26	2:00 p.m.	Missouri Mines	Francis Field; St. Louis, MO	W 26–7		
October 3		Sewanee	Francis Field; St. Louis, MO	W 40–20		
October 10	2:00 p.m.	Wayne	Francis Field; St. Louis, MO	L 13–33	4,000	
October 17		at Illinois Wesleyan	Bloomington, IL	W 54–6		
October 24		at Western Michigan	Waldo Stadium; Kalamazoo, MI	W 18–7	8,000	
October 31	1:00 p.m.	at Western Reserve	Clarke Field; Cleveland, OH	L 14–20	5,000	
November 7	2:00 p.m.	Butler^{†}	Francis Field; St. Louis, MO	W 27–14	8,000	
November 14	2:00 p.m.	Southern Illinois	Francis Field; St. Louis, MO	W 28–6	5,000	
November 21	12:30 p.m.	at Evansville	Reitz Bowl; Evansville, IN	W 34–13	2,000	
^{†}Homecoming; All times are in Central time
