= Corcoran Stadium =

Stadium in Cincinnati, Ohio, US

Coordinates: 39.148542°N 84.478504°W

Corcoran Stadium was a stadium in Cincinnati, Ohio. It hosted the Xavier University Musketeers football team until the school dropped football for financial reasons in 1973. The stadium held 15,000 people when it opened on November 23, 1929. The grandstands were finally razed in 1988 after attempts to revive the program in the NCAA's Division III failed. The facility is now known as Corcoran Field. It is used for soccer and lacrosse, and has seating for 1,500.

Corcoran Stadium also played host to one National Football League (NFL) game, on October 7, 1934, when the Cincinnati Reds took on the Chicago Cardinals. The Reds lost the game by a score of 13–0 before 2,500 fans.

Corcoran Stadium can be seen in the 1946 movie The Best Years of Our Lives as "Jackson High Football Stadium". A few seconds later Walnut Hills High School with its distinctive dome and football field can be seen along with the downtown Cincinnati skyline (Carew Tower and PNC Tower) in the background.
