= 1953 college football season =

American college football season

- First AP No. 1 of season: Notre Dame
- Number of bowls: 7
- Champion(s): Maryland (AP, Coaches)
- Heisman: Johnny Lattner (halfback, Notre Dame)

The 1953 college football season was marked by the NCAA Rules Committee's revocation of the two-platoon system and unlimited substitution rules in favor of the historic one-platoon system with its highly restrictive substitution rules. This radical rules shift made the 1953 season "The Year of the Great Adjustment," in the words of sportswriter Tommy Devine of the Detroit Free Press, in which teams scrambled to tighten their rosters and alter their strategies in accord with the more traditional "iron man" game.

The season finished with four teams selected as national champions:

- Maryland finished the regular season undefeated (10–0) and was ranked No. 1 in the final Associated Press (AP), United Press (UP) coaches, and International News Service polls (all released before the bowl games were played). The Terrapins then lost to No. 4 Oklahoma in the Orange Bowl.
- Notre Dame compiled a 9–0–1 record (including victories over Oklahoma and Georgia Tech) and was ranked No. 2 in the final AP and UP polls. The Irish have been recognized as the national champion by 11 official selectors. Notre Dame's Johnny Lattner won the Heisman Trophy and the Maxwell Award as the best player in college football. Notre Dame does not recognize this title due to its policy of only recognizing AP or Coaches Poll titles during the polling era (1936–present).
- Oklahoma compiled a 9–1–1, including a victory over No. 1 Maryland in the Orange Bowl. The Sooners were ranked No. 4 in the final AP poll but have been recognized as national champion by Berryman (QPRS) and College Football Researchers Association.
- Prairie View compiled a perfect 12–0 record, outscored opponents by a total of 387 to 88, and was recognized as the black college national champion.

The Cincinnati Bearcats, under head coach Sid Gilman, compiled a 9–1 record and led the country in both total offense (409.5 yards per game) and total defense (184.3 yards per game).

Small college teams compiling perfect records included Juniata (three consecutive undefeated seasons), Peru State (part of 26-game winning streak), and Shippensburg (consecutive perfect seasons).

Individual statistical leaders in major college football included Paul Larson of California with 1,572 yards of total offense; Bobby Garrett of Stanford with 1,637 passing yards; J. C. Caroline of Illinois with 1,256 rushing yards; Johnny Carson of Georgia with 663 receiving yards; and Earl Lindley of Utah State with 81 points scored.

== Conference and program changes ==
=== Conference changes ===
- Two conferences began play in 1953:
  - Atlantic Coast Conference – an active NCAA Division I FBS conference; formed by seven former members of the Southern Conference with an eighth member, Virginia added in December 1953
  - Prairie College Conference – active through the 1967 season
- One conference changed its name in 1953:
  - With the addition of independent Michigan State, the Intercollegiate Conference of Faculty Representatives (commonly the Big Nine Conference) once again became the Big Ten Conference (the league had 10 members before Chicago's departure in 1946). The Big Ten name was not officially adopted until 1987.

=== Membership changes ===
School	1952 conference	1953 conference
Cincinnati Bearcats	MAC	Independent
Clemson Tigers	SoCon	ACC
Duke Blue Devils	SoCon	ACC
Erskine Flying Fleet	Independent	Dropped program
Evansville Purple Aces	Ohio Valley	Indiana Collegiate Conference
Marshall Thundering Herd	Independent	MAC
Maryland Terrapins	SoCon	ACC
Michigan State Spartans	Independent	Big Ten (was Big Nine)
Middle Tennessee State Blue Raiders	VSAC	Ohio Valley
NYU Violets	Independent	Dropped program
North Carolina Tar Heels	SoCon	ACC
NC State Wolfpack	SoCon	ACC
Santa Clara Broncos	Independent	Dropped program
South Carolina Gamecocks	SoCon	ACC
Wake Forest Demon Deacons	SoCon	ACC

== September ==
In the preseason poll released on September 14, 1953, Notre Dame was rated first, followed by the defending champion, Michigan State, Georgia Tech, UCLA, and Alabama. As the regular season progressed, a new poll would be issued on the Monday following the weekend's games.

In a Friday night game at Los Angeles, No. 4 UCLA beat Oregon State 41–0. Meanwhile, at Montgomery, AL, No. 5 Alabama was shocked by Southern Mississippi, 25–19. The next day, September 19 No. 3 Georgia Tech beat Davidson, 53–0. Notre Dame and Michigan State began their seasons the following week.

On September 26 No. 1 Notre Dame won 28–21 at No. 6 Oklahoma. No. 2 Michigan State won at Iowa, 21–7. No. 3 Georgia Tech went to No. 15 Florida and was held to a 0–0 tie. No. 4 UCLA beat Kansas 19–7. Still at No. 5, Alabama, trying to salvage some respect against a second unranked opponent, went to 0–1–1 after a 7–7 tie against LSU in Mobile; in the poll that followed, the Crimson Tide fell completely out of the Top 20. No. 9 Maryland, which had won 52–0 at Washington and Lee, rose to third, and previously unranked Michigan (a 50–0 victor over Washington), entered the poll at fourth. The top five were No. 1 Notre Dame, No. 2 Michigan State, No. 3 Maryland, No. 4 Michigan, and No. 5 UCLA.

== October ==
October 3 With the exception of No. 4 Michigan, which beat Tulane 26–7 at home, the other top teams won on the road: No. 1 Notre Dame at Purdue, 37–7, No. 2 Michigan State at Minnesota 21–0, No. 3 Maryland at Clemson, 20–0, and No. 5 UCLA defeated Oregon 12–0 in an away game. No. 6 Ohio State, which won 33–19 at California, rose to third in the next poll, knocking UCLA down to sixth. The Big Ten had three of the spots in the top five: No. 1 Notre Dame, No. 2 Michigan State, No. 3 Ohio State, No. 4 Maryland, and No. 5 Michigan.

October 10 No. 1 Notre Dame was idle, but stayed at No. 1 after No. 2 Michigan State's 26–19 win over TCU. No. 4 Maryland won 40–13 over Georgia and No. 5 Michigan edged Iowa 14–13. The night before, No. 3 Ohio State had lost 40–21 to Illinois, while No. 6 UCLA returned to the top bracket with a 13–0 win over visiting Wisconsin. The next poll: No. 1 Notre Dame, No. 2 Michigan State, No. 3 Maryland, No. 4 UCLA, and No. 5 Michigan.

October 17 No. 1 Notre Dame beat No. 15 Pittsburgh 23–14. No. 2 Michigan State defeated Indiana 47–18. No. 3 Maryland won 26–0 at North Carolina. No. 4 UCLA lost at Stanford, 21–20. No. 5 Michigan beat Northwestern 20–12. No. 6 Georgia Tech, which beat Auburn 36–6, took UCLA's place in the next poll: No. 1 Notre Dame, No. 2 Michigan State, No. 3 Maryland, No. 4 Georgia Tech, and No. 5 Michigan.

October 24 No. 1 Notre Dame stayed unbeaten with a 27–14 win over No. 4 Georgia Tech. No. 2 Michigan State lost 6–0 at Purdue and No. 5 Michigan lost at Minnesota 22–0. No. 3 Maryland won a Friday game at Miami, 30–0. Coming into the Top Five were No. 6 Baylor (14–13 over No. 15 Texas A&M), No. 7 Illinois (20–13 over Syracuse), and No. 8 West Virginia (52–20 over VMI). The next poll: No. 1 Notre Dame, No. 2 Maryland, No. 3 Baylor, No. 4 Illinois, and No. 5 West Virginia.

October 31 No. 1 Notre Dame beat No. 20 Navy 38–7. No. 2 Maryland beat South Carolina 24–6. No. 3 Baylor beat TCU 25–7. No. 4 Illinois defeated Purdue 21–0. No. 5 West Virginia won at Penn State 20–19. No. 6 Michigan State, which beat Oregon State 34–6, rose to fifth. The next poll: No. 1 Notre Dame, No. 2 Maryland, No. 3.Baylor, No. 4 Illinois, and No. 5 Michigan State.

== November ==
November 7 No. 1 Notre Dame won 28–20 at Penn. No. 2 Maryland beat George Washington University 27–6 at a game in Washington, DC. No. 3 Baylor lost at No. 19 Texas, 21–20. No. 4 Illinois beat No. 17 Michigan 9–3. No. 5 Michigan State won 28–13 at No. 16 Ohio State, and No. 6 Georgia Tech beat Clemson 20–7. The next poll featured No. 1 Notre Dame, No. 2 Maryland, No. 3 Illinois, No. 4 Michigan State, and No. 5 Georgia Tech.

November 14 No. 1 Notre Dame won at North Carolina, 34–14, and No. 2 Maryland beat No. 11 Mississippi 38–0 as both stayed unbeaten and untied. No. 4 Michigan State beat Michigan 14–6. On the other hand, No. 3 Illinois lost to Wisconsin, 34–7 and No. 5 Georgia Tech fell 13–6 to Alabama in a game at Birmingham. Returning to the Top Five to take their place were No. 6 Oklahoma and No. 7 UCLA, which had defeated Iowa State (47–0) and Washington (22–6), respectively. The next ranking was No. 1 Notre Dame, No. 2 Maryland, No. 3 Michigan State, No. 4 Oklahoma, and No. 5 UCLA.

November 21 Number one since the season began, No. 1 Notre Dame played to a 14–14 tie with No. 20 Iowa in a controversial game where Notre Dame's players were accused of faking injuries to stop the clock and gain time for a final touchdown. No. 2 Maryland closed its season with a 21–0 win over No. 11 Alabama to finish the season unbeaten and untied at 10–0–0. No. 3 Michigan State closed with a 21–15 win over Marquette. No. 4 Oklahoma beat Nebraska 30–7, and No. 5 UCLA beat No. 9 USC, 13–0. The next poll featured No. 1 Maryland, No. 2 Notre Dame, No. 3 Michigan State, No. 4 Oklahoma, and No. 5 UCLA.

November 28 The new No. 1, Maryland had already finished its season. No. 2 Notre Dame, with a 48–14 win at No. 20 USC, and No. 4 Oklahoma (42–7 over Oklahoma A&M) were the only Top Five members who hadn't closed their seasons.

November 30 The final AP Poll ranked Maryland, the only unbeaten and untied team, No. 1 with 187 first place votes. Unbeaten, once-tied, and one-game-left-to-play No. 2 Notre Dame received 141 votes.

December 5 Notre Dame beat visiting SMU 40–14. No additional AP Poll was taken because there were few other games played this Saturday.

ACC member Maryland would accept a bid to the Orange Bowl to meet once-beaten (8–1–1), Big 7 champ, and No. 4 Oklahoma, while No. 3 Michigan State and No. 5 UCLA would meet in the Rose Bowl. Notre Dame declined to participate in a postseason game.

== Postseason ==
After the AP national champion Maryland lost in the Orange Bowl, there was a lot of controversy since the AP Poll had been finalized beforehand and could not be changed to take this result into account. This Maryland loss resulted in Notre Dame being ranked No. 1 by 10 polls, including Billingsley , Boand, DeVold, Dunkel, National Championship Foundation, Williamson, and several others. As a reward for beating the Terrapins, the Sooners received No. 1 from Berryman and Football Research.

== Conference standings ==
=== Major conference standings ===
1953 Atlantic Coast Conference football standings
	Conf.					Overall
Team	W		L		T	W		L		T
No. 1 Maryland +	3	–	0	–	0	10	–	1	–	0
No. 18 Duke +	4	–	0	–	0	7	–	2	–	1
South Carolina	2	–	3	–	0	7	–	3	–	0
North Carolina	2	–	3	–	0	4	–	6	–	0
Wake Forest	2	–	3	–	0	3	–	6	–	1
Clemson	1	–	2	–	0	3	–	5	–	1
NC State	0	–	3	–	0	1	–	9	–	0
+ – Conference co-champions; Rankings from AP poll

1953 Big Seven Conference football standings
	Conf.					Overall
Team	W		L		T	W		L		T
No. 4 Oklahoma $	6	–	0	–	0	9	–	1	–	1
Missouri	4	–	2	–	0	6	–	4	–	0
Kansas State	4	–	2	–	0	6	–	3	–	1
Colorado	2	–	4	–	0	6	–	4	–	0
Nebraska	2	–	4	–	0	3	–	6	–	1
Kansas	2	–	4	–	0	2	–	8	–	0
Iowa State	1	–	5	–	0	2	–	7	–	0
$ – Conference champion; Rankings from AP Poll

1953 Big Ten Conference football standings
	Conf.					Overall
Team	W		L		T	W		L		T
No. 3 Michigan State +	5	–	1	–	0	9	–	1	–	0
No. 7 Illinois +	5	–	1	–	0	7	–	1	–	1
No. 15 Wisconsin	4	–	1	–	1	6	–	2	–	1
Ohio State	4	–	3	–	0	6	–	3	–	0
Minnesota	3	–	3	–	1	4	–	4	–	1
No. 20 Michigan	3	–	3	–	0	6	–	3	–	0
No. 9 Iowa	3	–	3	–	0	5	–	3	–	1
Purdue	2	–	4	–	0	2	–	7	–	0
Indiana	1	–	5	–	0	2	–	7	–	0
Northwestern	0	–	6	–	0	3	–	6	–	0
+ – Conference co-champions; Rankings from AP Poll

1953 Border Conference football standings
	Conf.					Overall
Team	W		L		T	W		L		T
No. 12 Texas Tech $	5	–	0	–	0	11	–	1	–	0
Hardin–Simmons	4	–	1	–	0	6	–	5	–	0
Texas Western	4	–	2	–	0	8	–	2	–	0
Arizona	3	–	2	–	0	4	–	5	–	1
Arizona State	1	–	3	–	0	4	–	5	–	1
New Mexico A&M	1	–	4	–	0	2	–	7	–	0
West Texas State	0	–	6	–	0	1	–	8	–	1
$ – Conference champion; Rankings from AP Poll

1953 Ivy League football standings
	Conf.					Overall
Team	W		L		T	W		L		T
Cornell	3	–	0	–	2	4	–	3	–	2
Harvard	3	–	2	–	0	6	–	2	–	0
Yale	3	–	2	–	1	5	–	2	–	2
Princeton	3	–	3	–	0	5	–	4	–	0
Columbia	2	–	3	–	0	4	–	5	–	0
Dartmouth	2	–	3	–	0	2	–	7	–	0
Brown	0	–	3	–	0	3	–	5	–	1
Penn	0	–	0	–	1	3	–	5	–	1
The Ivy League in 1953 completed on a league basis in baseball, basketball, hockey, tennis and swimming. In football, there was an agreement among the schools to establish conditions to assure sportsmanship and amateurism. Moreover, newspapers regularly printed football standings for the Ivy League schools.

1953 Mid-American Conference football standings
	Conf.					Overall
Team	W		L		T	W		L		T
Ohio $	5	–	0	–	1	6	–	2	–	1
Miami (OH)	3	–	0	–	1	7	–	1	–	1
Kent State	3	–	1	–	0	7	–	2	–	0
Toledo	2	–	3	–	0	3	–	6	–	0
Western Reserve	1	–	2	–	1	5	–	3	–	1
Western Michigan	0	–	4	–	1	1	–	6	–	1
Bowling Green	0	–	4	–	0	1	–	8	–	0
$ – Conference champion

1953 Middle Three Conference football standings
	Conf.					Overall
Team	W		L		T	W		L		T
Rutgers $	1	–	0	–	0	2	–	6	–	0
Lafayette	1	–	1	–	0	5	–	4	–	0
Lehigh	0	–	1	–	0	4	–	5	–	0
$ – Conference champion

1953 Pacific Coast Conference football standings
	Conf.					Overall
Team	W		L		T	W		L		T
No. 5 UCLA $	6	–	1	–	0	8	–	2	–	0
No. 19 Stanford	5	–	1	–	1	6	–	3	–	1
USC	4	–	2	–	1	6	–	3	–	1
California	2	–	2	–	2	4	–	4	–	2
Washington State	3	–	4	–	0	4	–	6	–	0
Oregon State	3	–	5	–	0	3	–	6	–	0
Washington	2	–	4	–	1	3	–	6	–	1
Oregon	2	–	5	–	1	4	–	5	–	1
Idaho	0	–	3	–	0	1	–	8	–	0
$ – Conference champion; Rankings from AP Poll

1953 Skyline Conference football standings
	Conf.					Overall
Team	W		L		T	W		L		T
Utah $	5	–	0	–	0	8	–	2	–	0
Utah State	5	–	2	–	0	8	–	3	–	0
Wyoming	4	–	2	–	1	5	–	4	–	1
New Mexico	3	–	2	–	1	5	–	3	–	1
Colorado A&M	3	–	4	–	0	4	–	5	–	0
Montana	2	–	4	–	0	3	–	5	–	0
Denver	1	–	5	–	1	3	–	5	–	2
BYU	1	–	5	–	1	2	–	7	–	1
$ – Conference champion

1953 Southeastern Conference football standings
	Conf.					Overall
Team	W		L		T	W		L		T
No. 13 Alabama $	4	–	0	–	3	6	–	3	–	3
No. 8 Georgia Tech	4	–	1	–	1	9	–	2	–	1
No. 16 Kentucky	4	–	1	–	1	7	–	2	–	1
Ole Miss	4	–	1	–	1	7	–	2	–	1
No. 17 Auburn	4	–	2	–	1	7	–	3	–	1
Mississippi State	3	–	1	–	3	5	–	2	–	3
Tennessee	3	–	2	–	1	6	–	4	–	1
LSU	2	–	3	–	3	5	–	3	–	3
Florida	1	–	3	–	2	3	–	5	–	2
Vanderbilt	1	–	5	–	0	3	–	7	–	0
Georgia	1	–	5	–	0	3	–	8	–	0
Tulane	0	–	7	–	0	1	–	8	–	1
$ – Conference champion; Rankings from AP Poll

1953 Southern Conference football standings
	Conf.					Overall
Team	W		L		T	W		L		T
No. 10 West Virginia $	4	–	0	–	0	8	–	2	–	0
Furman	2	–	0	–	0	7	–	2	–	0
George Washington	4	–	2	–	0	5	–	4	–	0
William & Mary	3	–	2	–	0	5	–	4	–	1
Richmond	3	–	3	–	0	5	–	3	–	1
VPI	3	–	3	–	0	5	–	5	–	0
VMI	3	–	3	–	0	5	–	5	–	0
Washington and Lee	2	–	4	–	0	4	–	6	–	0
The Citadel	1	–	3	–	0	2	–	7	–	0
Davidson	0	–	5	–	0	0	–	9	–	0
$ – Conference champion; Rankings from AP Poll

1953 Southwest Conference football standings
	Conf.					Overall
Team	W		L		T	W		L		T
No. 6 Rice +	5	–	1	–	0	9	–	2	–	0
No. 11 Texas +	5	–	1	–	0	7	–	3	–	0
Baylor	4	–	2	–	0	7	–	3	–	0
SMU	3	–	3	–	0	5	–	5	–	0
Arkansas	2	–	4	–	0	3	–	7	–	0
Texas A&M	1	–	5	–	0	4	–	5	–	1
TCU	1	–	5	–	0	3	–	7	–	0
+ – Conference co-champions; Rankings from AP Poll

=== Independents ===
1953 Eastern college football independents records
	Conf.			Overall
Team	W	L	T	W		L		T
Westminster (PA)		–		8	–	0	–	0
Juniata		–		7	–	0	–	0
No. 14 Army		–		7	–	1	–	1
Franklin & Marshall		–		5	–	2	–	0
Hofstra		–		6	–	3	–	0
Penn State		–		6	–	3	–	0
Carnegie Tech		–		5	–	3	–	0
Boston College		–		5	–	3	–	1
Boston University		–		5	–	3	–	1
Syracuse		–		5	–	3	–	1
Tufts		–		4	–	3	–	0
Holy Cross		–		5	–	5	–	0
Temple		–		4	–	4	–	1
Colgate		–		3	–	4	–	2
Fordham		–		4	–	5	–	0
Villanova		–		4	–	6	–	0
Drexel		–		2	–	3	–	1
Pittsburgh		–		3	–	5	–	1
Buffalo		–		1	–	5	–	1
Bucknell		–		1	–	8	–	0
Rankings from AP Poll

1953 Midwestern college football independents records
	Conf.			Overall
Team	W	L	T	W		L		T
No. 2 Notre Dame		–		9	–	0	–	1
Cincinnati		–		9	–	1	–	0
Carthage		–		8	–	1	–	0
Youngstown		–		7	–	1	–	0
John Carroll		–		7	–	2	–	0
Washington University		–		7	–	2	–	0
Rose Poly		–		6	–	2	–	0
Wabash		–		6	–	2	–	1
Marquette		–		6	–	3	–	1
Baldwin–Wallace		–		4	–	4	–	0
Drake		–		4	–	4	–	0
Wayne		–		3	–	4	–	1
Dayton		–		3	–	5	–	1
Michigan Tech		–		2	–	5	–	0
Xavier		–		2	–	7	–	1
Rankings from AP Poll

1953 Southern college football independents records
	Conf.			Overall
Team	W	L	T	W		L		T
Arkansas State		–		8	–	0	–	2
Delaware		–		7	–	1	–	0
Maryland State		–		7	–	1	–	0
Mississippi Southern		–		9	–	2	–	0
Navy		–		4	–	3	–	2
Memphis State		–		6	–	4	–	0
Florida State		–		5	–	5	–	0
Tampa		–		6	–	6	–	0
Miami (FL)		–		4	–	5	–	0
Sewanee		–		3	–	5	–	0
Marshall		–		2	–	5	–	2
Mississippi Vocational		–		2	–	4	–	0
Chattanooga		–		3	–	7	–	0
Louisville		–		1	–	7	–	0
Virginia		–		1	–	8	–	0

1953 Western college football independents records
	Conf.			Overall
Team	W	L	T	W		L		T
Pacific (CA)		–		4	–	4	–	2
San Jose State		–		4	–	4	–	1
Hawaii		–		5	–	6	–	0
Nevada		–		2	–	3	–	0
La Verne		–		3	–	7	–	0
Cal Poly San Dimas		–		2	–	6	–	0

=== Minor conferences ===
Conference	Champion(s)	Record
California Collegiate Athletic Association	Cal Poly–San Luis Obispo	5–0
Central Church College Conference	Dana	3–1
Central Intercollegiate Athletics Association	North Carolina College	5–1
Central Intercollegiate Athletic Conference	Saint Benedict's; Washburn	4–1
College Conference of Illinois	Wheaton (IL)	4–0
Evergreen Conference	Puget Sound; Whitworth	5–1
Far Western Conference	Chico State College	1–0–1
Frontier Conference	Carroll (MT)	4–0
Gulf Coast Conference	Trinity (TX)	2–0
Indiana Collegiate Conference	Butler	5–0
Iowa Intercollegiate Athletic Conference	Iowa Wesleyan	4–0
Kansas Collegiate Athletic Conference	College of Emporia	7–0
Lone Star Conference	East Texas State Teachers	5–0
Michigan Intercollegiate Athletic Association	Hope	5–1
Mid-American Conference	Ohio	5–0–1
Midwest Collegiate Athletic Conference	Saint Olaf	6–0
Minnesota Intercollegiate Athletic Conference	Gustavus Adolphus	6–0
Missouri Intercollegiate Athletic Association	Northeast Missouri State	5–0
Nebraska College Conference	Peru State Teachers	6–0
New Mexico Intercollegiate Conference	Panhandle A&M	6–0
North Central Intercollegiate Athletic Conference	South Dakota State College	5–0–1
North Dakota College Athletic Conference	Valley City State	6–0
Ohio Athletic Conference	Ohio Wesleyan	7–0
Ohio Valley Conference	Tennessee Tech	5–0
Oklahoma Collegiate Athletic Conference	Northeastern State College (OK)	4–0–1
Oregon Collegiate Conference	Unknown	—
Pacific Northwest Conference	College of Idaho	5–0
Pennsylvania State Athletic Conference	Shippensburg State Teachers; West Chester State Teachers	6–0; 4–0
Rocky Mountain Athletic Conference	Idaho State College	5–0
South Dakota Intercollegiate Conference	Northern State Teachers	6–0
Southern California Intercollegiate Athletic Conference	Pomona-Pitzer	3–1
Southern Intercollegiate Athletic Conference	Florida A&M	6–0
Southwestern Athletic Conference	Prairie View A&M College	6–0
State Teacher's College Conference of Minnesota	St. Cloud State Teachers	4–0
Texas Collegiate Athletic Conference	Abilene Christian; McMurry (TX); Texas A&I College	3–1
Wisconsin State College Conference	Wisconsin State–La Crosse; Wisconsin State–Platteville	5–0; 4–0

=== Minor conference standings ===
1953 California Collegiate Athletic Association football standings
	Conf.					Overall
Team	W		L		T	W		L		T
Cal Poly $	5	–	0	–	0	9	–	0	–	0
San Diego State	3	–	1	–	1	5	–	3	–	1
Fresno State	2	–	2	–	1	4	–	4	–	2
Pepperdine	2	–	3	–	0	3	–	6	–	0
Santa Barbara	1	–	4	–	0	2	–	6	–	1
Los Angeles State	1	–	4	–	0	2	–	7	–	0
$ – Conference champion

1953 Central Church College Conference football standings
	Conf.					Overall
Team	W		L		T	W		L		T
Dana $	3	–	1	–	0	4	–	3	–	1
Concordia (NE)	2	–	1	–	1	7	–	1	–	1
Tarkio	0	–	3	–	1	2	–	5	–	1
$ – Conference champion

1953 Central Intercollegiate Athletic Association football standings
	Conf.					Overall
Team	W		L		T	W		L		T
No. 7 North Carolina College $	5	–	1	–	0	5	–	3	–	0
No. 8 Virginia State	5	–	2	–	1	5	–	3	–	1
No. 9 Morgan State	5	–	1	–	0	6	–	2	–	0
North Carolina A&T	4	–	2	–	0	4	–	4	–	0
No. 11 West Virginia State	4	–	2	–	0	6	–	3	–	0
Hampton	5	–	3	–	0	6	–	3	–	1
Johnson C. Smith	5	–	2	–	0	5	–	3	–	0
Howard	3	–	5	–	0	3	–	5	–	1
Shaw	2	–	4	–	0	2	–	7	–	0
St. Augustine's	2	–	4	–	0	3	–	4	–	1
Virginia Union	2	–	4	–	1	5	–	4	–	1
Lincoln (PA)	2	–	4	–	0	3	–	5	–	0
Winston-Salem State	2	–	4	–	0	3	–	5	–	1
Delaware State	2	–	4	–	0	4	–	4	–	0
Bluefield State	2	–	5	–	0	2	–	7	–	0
Saint Paul's (VA)	1	–	4	–	0	1	–	6	–	0
$ – Conference champion; Conference standings were based on the Dickinson System.; Rankings from Pittsburgh Courier

1953 Central Intercollegiate Conference football standings
	Conf.					Overall
Team	W		L		T	W		L		T
Washburn +	4	–	1	–	0	7	–	1	–	0
St. Benedict's +	4	–	1	–	0	7	–	2	–	0
Pittsburg State	2	–	2	–	1	6	–	3	–	1
Fort Hays State	2	–	2	–	1	3	–	4	–	1
Emporia State	2	–	3	–	0	2	–	5	–	1
Southwestern (KS)	0	–	5	–	0	1	–	8	–	0
+ – Conference co-champions

1953 College Conference of Illinois football standings
	Conf.					Overall
Team	W		L		T	W		L		T
Wheaton (IL) $	4	–	0	–	0	8	–	1	–	0
Lake Forest	4	–	1	–	0	5	–	3	–	0
Augustana (IL)	3	–	2	–	0	5	–	4	–	0
Millikin	2	–	3	–	0	3	–	5	–	0
North Central (IL)	2	–	4	–	0	2	–	6	–	0
Illinois Wesleyan	1	–	3	–	1	1	–	7	–	1
Elmhurst	1	–	3	–	0	3	–	4	–	1
$ – Conference champion

1953 Eastern Intercollegiate Athletic Conference football standings
	Conf.					Overall
Team	W		L		T	W		L		T
Elizabeth City State +	3	–	0	–	1	5	–	1	–	2
Morristown +	3	–	0	–	1	?	–	?	–	?
Fayetteville State	2	–	2	–	0	3	–	5	–	1
Livingstone	1	–	3	–	0	3	–	4	–	0
Norfolk State	0	–	4	–	0	1	–	6	–	0
+ – Conference co-champions

1953 Evergreen Conference football standings
	Conf.					Overall
Team	W		L		T	W		L		T
Puget Sound +	5	–	1	–	0	7	–	1	–	0
Whitworth +	5	–	1	–	0	7	–	1	–	0
Eastern Washington	4	–	2	–	0	6	–	2	–	0
Pacific Lutheran	3	–	3	–	0	3	–	6	–	0
Western Washington	2	–	4	–	0	3	–	4	–	2
Central Washington	2	–	4	–	0	2	–	6	–	0
UBC	0	–	6	–	0	?	–	?	–	?
+ – Conference co-champions

1953 Far Western Conference football standings
	Conf.					Overall
Team	W		L		T	W		L		T
Chico State $	4	–	0	–	1	6	–	3	–	1
Humboldt State	2	–	1	–	0	6	–	2	–	0
Cal Aggies	1	–	2	–	1	1	–	6	–	1
San Francisco State	0	–	1	–	0	5	–	3	–	0
Southern Oregon	0	–	3	–	0	3	–	4	–	0
$ – Conference champion; Conference records includes both Chico State vs. Cal Aggies games

1953 Hoosier Conference football standings
	Conf.					Overall
Team	W		L		T	W		L		T
Indiana Central $	6	–	0	–	0	8	–	0	–	0
Earlham	4	–	2	–	0	6	–	2	–	0
Hanover	4	–	2	–	0	4	–	4	–	1
Anderson (IN)	3	–	3	–	0	3	–	5	–	0
Taylor	3	–	3	–	0	4	–	4	–	0
Franklin (IN)	1	–	5	–	0	1	–	7	–	0
Manchester (IN)	0	–	6	–	0	0	–	9	–	0
$ – Conference champion

1953 Gulf Coast Conference football standings
	Conf.					Overall
Team	W		L		T	W		L		T
Trinity (TX) $	2	–	0	–	0	8	–	1	–	0
North Texas State	1	–	1	–	0	3	–	6	–	1
Midwestern (TX)	0	–	2	–	0	2	–	8	–	1
$ – Conference champion

1953 Gulf States Conference football standings
	Conf.					Overall
Team	W		L		T	W		L		T
Northwestern State +	5	–	1	–	0	6	–	2	–	0
Louisiana Tech +	5	–	1	–	0	6	–	3	–	0
Southeastern Louisiana +	5	–	1	–	0	6	–	3	–	0
Southwestern Louisiana	2	–	4	–	0	4	–	7	–	0
McNeese State	2	–	4	–	0	3	–	6	–	0
Louisiana College	1	–	5	–	0	4	–	6	–	0
Northeast Louisiana State	1	–	5	–	0	1	–	9	–	0
+ – Conference co-champions

1953 Indiana Collegiate Conference football standings
	Conf.					Overall
Team	W		L		T	W		L		T
Butler $	5	–	0	–	0	6	–	2	–	0
Valparaiso	3	–	2	–	0	5	–	2	–	1
Ball State	3	–	2	–	0	5	–	2	–	1
Indiana State	2	–	3	–	0	5	–	3	–	0
Evansville	2	–	3	–	0	3	–	7	–	0
Saint Joseph's (IN)	0	–	5	–	0	2	–	6	–	0
DePauw	0	–	0	–	0	0	–	7	–	1
$ – Conference champion

1953 Interstate Intercollegiate Athletic Conference football standings
	Conf.					Overall
Team	W		L		T	W		L		T
Central Michigan $	5	–	0	–	1	7	–	1	–	1
Western Illinois	5	–	1	–	0	8	–	2	–	0
Michigan State Normal	4	–	1	–	1	7	–	1	–	1
Illinois State Normal	3	–	3	–	0	5	–	4	–	0
Southern Illinois	2	–	4	–	0	2	–	7	–	0
Northern Illinois State	1	–	5	–	0	1	–	8	–	0
Eastern Illinois	0	–	6	–	0	1	–	8	–	0
$ – Conference champion

1953 Iowa Conference football standings
	Conf.					Overall
Team	W		L		T	W		L		T
Northern Division
Wartburg xy	3	–	0	–	0	4	–	5	–	0
Luther	2	–	1	–	0	5	–	3	–	0
Upper Iowa	1	–	2	–	0	3	–	4	–	0
Buena Vista	0	–	3	–	0	2	–	6	–	1
Southern Division
Iowa Wesleyan xy$	4	–	0	–	0	9	–	1	–	0
Central (IA)	3	–	1	–	0	4	–	3	–	1
Dubuque	2	–	2	–	0	4	–	3	–	0
Parsons	1	–	3	–	0	3	–	5	–	0
Simpson (IA)	0	–	4	–	0	0	–	8	–	0
Championship: Iowa Wesleyan 33, Wartburg 14
$ – Conference champion; x – Division champion/co-champions; y – Championship game participant

1953 Kansas Collegiate Athletic Conference football standings
	Conf.					Overall
Team	W		L		T	W		L		T
College of Emporia $	7	–	0	–	0	8	–	0	–	0
McPherson	6	–	1	–	0	8	–	1	–	0
Bethany (KS)	4	–	3	–	0	4	–	4	–	0
Kansas Wesleyan	3	–	3	–	1	3	–	5	–	1
Baker	3	–	4	–	0	4	–	5	–	0
Friends	2	–	5	–	0	4	–	5	–	0
Ottawa	2	–	5	–	0	3	–	6	–	0
Bethel (KS)	0	–	6	–	1	1	–	7	–	1
$ – Conference champion

1953 Lone Star Conference football standings
	Conf.					Overall
Team	W		L		T	W		L		T
East Texas State $	5	–	0	–	0	10	–	0	–	1
Sam Houston State	4	–	1	–	0	9	–	1	–	0
Southwest Texas State	3	–	2	–	0	5	–	4	–	0
Lamar Tech	2	–	3	–	0	3	–	7	–	0
Sul Ross	1	–	4	–	0	4	–	7	–	0
Stephen F. Austin	0	–	5	–	0	1	–	8	–	0
$ – Conference champion

1953 Mason–Dixon Conference football standings
	Conf.					Overall
Team	W		L		T	W		L		T
Hampden–Sydney $	3	–	0	–	1	5	–	1	–	1
Western Maryland	2	–	0	–	1	4	–	3	–	1
Randolph–Macon	2	–	2	–	0	3	–	4	–	2
Bridgewater	1	–	2	–	0	3	–	3	–	0
Gallaudet	0	–	1	–	0	2	–	2	–	0
Johns Hopkins	0	–	3	–	0	2	–	6	–	0
$ – Conference champion; Conference standings were based on the Dickinson Scoring System.

1953 Michigan Intercollegiate Athletic Association football standings
	Conf.					Overall
Team	W		L		T	W		L		T
Hope $	5	–	1	–	0	7	–	2	–	0
Albion	4	–	1	–	1	5	–	2	–	1
Alma	4	–	2	–	0	7	–	2	–	0
Hillsdale	3	–	1	–	2	4	–	2	–	2
Olivet	2	–	4	–	0	4	–	5	–	0
Adrian	1	–	4	–	1	2	–	5	–	1
Kalamazoo	0	–	6	–	0	1	–	7	–	0
$ – Conference champion

1953 Mid-Ohio League football standings
	Conf.					Overall
Team	W		L		T	W		L		T
Defiance $	4	–	0	–	0	8	–	0	–	0
Findlay	2	–	2	–	0	3	–	4	–	0
Bluffton	2	–	2	–	0	3	–	4	–	0
Ohio Northern	1	–	3	–	0	1	–	7	–	1
Ashland	1	–	3	–	0	1	–	7	–	0
$ – Conference champion

1953 Midwest Athletic Association football standings
	Conf.					Overall
Team	W		L		T	W		L		T
No. 4 Lincoln (MO) +	4	–	0	–	1	8	–	0	–	1
No. 3 Tennessee A&I +	2	–	0	–	1	8	–	0	–	1
No. 12 Grambling	2	–	1	–	0	8	–	2	–	0
No. 10 Texas Southern	2	–	1	–	0	7	–	3	–	0
Kentucky State	1	–	3	–	0	6	–	4	–	0
Central State (OH)	0	–	3	–	0	1	–	5	–	0
Jackson	0	–	3	–	0	5	–	4	–	0
+ – Conference co-champions; Rankings from Pittsburgh Courier

1953 Midwest Conference football standings
	Conf.					Overall
Team	W		L		T	W		L		T
St. Olaf $	6	–	0	–	0	8	–	0	–	0
Coe	5	–	0	–	1	5	–	2	–	1
Lawrence	5	–	1	–	1	6	–	1	–	1
Grinnell	4	–	3	–	0	4	–	4	–	0
Monmouth (IL)	4	–	3	–	0	5	–	3	–	0
Carleton	2	–	5	–	0	2	–	6	–	0
Knox	2	–	5	–	0	2	–	6	–	0
Ripon	1	–	5	–	0	1	–	6	–	0
Cornell (IA)	0	–	7	–	0	1	–	7	–	0
$ – Conference champion

1953 Minnesota Intercollegiate Athletic Conference football standings
	Conf.					Overall
Team	W		L		T	W		L		T
Gustavus Adolphus +	5	–	1	–	0	6	–	2	–	0
Saint John's (MN) +	5	–	1	–	0	6	–	2	–	0
Concordia (MN)	4	–	2	–	0	5	–	3	–	0
Macalester	4	–	2	–	0	5	–	3	–	0
Minnesota–Duluth	3	–	3	–	0	3	–	4	–	0
Hamline	3	–	3	–	0	4	–	3	–	0
St. Thomas (MN)	2	–	4	–	0	3	–	5	–	0
Augsburg	1	–	5	–	0	2	–	6	–	0
Saint Mary's (MN)	0	–	6	–	0	0	–	7	–	0
+ – Conference co-champions

1953 Minnesota Teachers College Conference football standings
	Conf.					Overall
Team	W		L		T	W		L		T
St. Cloud State $	4	–	0	–	0	6	–	1	–	0
Moorhead State	2	–	2	–	0	5	–	3	–	0
Winona State	2	–	2	–	0	4	–	4	–	0
Bemidji State	1	–	3	–	0	1	–	6	–	0
Mankato State	1	–	3	–	0	1	–	7	–	0
$ – Conference champion

1953 Missouri College Athletic Union football standings
	Conf.					Overall
Team	W		L		T	W		L		T
William Jewell $	4	–	0	–	0	9	–	1	–	0
Missouri Valley	3	–	1	–	0	7	–	1	–	1
Tarkio	2	–	2	–	0	2	–	5	–	1
Central (MO)	1	–	3	–	0	3	–	6	–	0
Culver–Stockton	0	–	4	–	0	0	–	8	–	0
$ – Conference champion

1953 Missouri Intercollegiate Athletic Association football standings
	Conf.					Overall
Team	W		L		T	W		L		T
NE Missouri State $	5	–	0	–	0	6	–	2	–	0
SW Missouri State	3	–	2	–	0	3	–	6	–	0
NW Missouri State	2	–	2	–	1	3	–	4	–	1
Missouri–Rolla	2	–	3	–	0	3	–	5	–	0
SE Missouri State	1	–	2	–	2	4	–	3	–	2
Central Missouri State	0	–	4	–	1	0	–	7	–	2
$ – Conference champion

1953 Missouri Valley Conference football standings
	Conf.					Overall
Team	W		L		T	W		L		T
Oklahoma A&M +	3	–	1	–	0	7	–	3	–	0
Detroit +	3	–	1	–	0	5	–	4	–	0
Wichita	1	–	2	–	0	4	–	4	–	1
Houston	1	–	2	–	0	4	–	4	–	1
Tulsa	1	–	3	–	0	3	–	7	–	0
+ – Conference co-champions

1953 Montana Collegiate Conference football standings
	Conf.					Overall
Team	W		L		T	W		L		T
Carroll (MT) $	4	–	0	–	0	5	–	2	–	1
Rocky Mountain	3	–	1	–	0	?	–	?	–	?
Eastern Montana	1	–	2	–	1	2	–	3	–	1
Montana Mines	1	–	2	–	1	?	–	?	–	?
Western Montana	0	–	4	–	0	?	–	?	–	?
$ – Conference champion

1953 Nebraska College Conference football standings
	Conf.					Overall
Team	W		L		T	W		L		T
Peru State $	6	–	0	–	0	8	–	0	–	0
Wayne State (NE)	4	–	2	–	1	5	–	3	–	1
Kearney State	3	–	2	–	1	3	–	5	–	1
Doane	3	–	2	–	2	4	–	3	–	2
Midland	4	–	3	–	0	5	–	4	–	0
Hastings	3	–	4	–	0	4	–	5	–	0
Nebraska Wesleyan	1	–	4	–	2	2	–	4	–	3
Chadron State	0	–	7	–	0	1	–	7	–	0
$ – Conference champion

1953 New Mexico Conference football standings
	Conf.					Overall
Team	W		L		T	W		L		T
Panhandle A&M $	6	–	0	–	0	8	–	1	–	1
New Mexico Military	4	–	2	–	0	4	–	3	–	0
Arizona State–Flagstaff	3	–	3	–	0	4	–	5	–	0
Eastern New Mexico	3	–	3	–	0	4	–	7	–	0
Adams State	3	–	3	–	0	3	–	6	–	0
New Mexico Western	2	–	4	–	0	3	–	5	–	0
New Mexico Highlands	0	–	6	–	0	0	–	8	–	0
$ – Conference champion

1953 North Central Conference football standings
	Conf.					Overall
Team	W		L		T	W		L		T
South Dakota State $	5	–	0	–	1	5	–	3	–	1
Iowa State Teachers	5	–	1	–	0	6	–	3	–	0
North Dakota	4	–	1	–	1	6	–	1	–	1
Morningside	2	–	4	–	0	3	–	5	–	0
North Dakota State	2	–	4	–	0	3	–	5	–	0
South Dakota	2	–	4	–	0	2	–	6	–	0
Augustana (SD)	0	–	6	–	0	1	–	8	–	0
$ – Conference champion

1953 North Dakota Intercollegiate Conference football standings
	Conf.					Overall
Team	W		L		T	W		L		T
Valley City State $	6	–	0	–	0	7	–	2	–	0
Minot State	5	–	1	–	0	6	–	2	–	0
Wahpeton Science	4	–	2	–	0	5	–	2	–	0
Mayville State	4	–	2	–	0	4	–	2	–	0
Jamestown	3	–	3	–	0	3	–	4	–	0
Bismarck JC	2	–	4	–	0	2	–	4	–	0
Dickinson State	2	–	4	–	0	2	–	5	–	0
Ellendale	1	–	5	–	0	1	–	6	–	0
Bottineau	0	–	6	–	0	0	–	6	–	0
$ – Conference champion

1953 North State Conference football standings
	Conf.					Overall
Team	W		L		T	W		L		T
East Carolina $	6	–	0	–	0	8	–	2	–	0
Catawba	4	–	1	–	1	4	–	5	–	1
Appalachian State	3	–	3	–	0	6	–	4	–	0
Lenoir Rhyne	3	–	3	–	0	4	–	5	–	0
Guilford	2	–	3	–	0	3	–	5	–	0
Elon	1	–	4	–	1	1	–	6	–	1
Western Carolina	0	–	5	–	0	1	–	9	–	0
$ – Conference champion

1953 Northwest Conference football standings
	Conf.					Overall
Team	W		L		T	W		L		T
College of Idaho $	5	–	0	–	0	8	–	1	–	0
Linfield	3	–	2	–	0	5	–	4	–	0
Willamette	2	–	2	–	1	2	–	5	–	1
Whitman	2	–	3	–	0	4	–	3	–	0
Lewis & Clark	2	–	3	–	0	4	–	5	–	0
Pacific (OR)	0	–	4	–	1	2	–	4	–	2
$ – Conference champion

1953 Ohio Athletic Conference football standings
	Conf.					Overall
Team	W		L		T	W		L		T
Ohio Wesleyan $	7	–	0	–	0	8	–	0	–	1
Heidelberg	4	–	1	–	1	7	–	1	–	1
Otterbein	5	–	2	–	0	5	–	3	–	0
Denison	4	–	2	–	0	7	–	2	–	0
Akron	4	–	2	–	0	6	–	3	–	0
Capital	3	–	2	–	0	5	–	3	–	0
Wooster	3	–	3	–	0	5	–	3	–	0
Muskingum	3	–	3	–	1	3	–	4	–	1
Mount Union	2	–	3	–	0	5	–	4	–	0
Wittenberg	2	–	4	–	0	3	–	6	–	0
Kenyon	1	–	3	–	0	3	–	4	–	0
Oberlin	0	–	5	–	0	1	–	6	–	1
Hiram	0	–	4	–	0	1	–	6	–	0
Marietta	0	–	4	–	0	1	–	6	–	0
$ – Conference champion

1953 Ohio Valley Conference football standings
	Conf.					Overall
Team	W		L		T	W		L		T
Tennessee Tech $	5	–	0	–	0	7	–	4	–	0
Eastern Kentucky	4	–	1	–	0	8	–	2	–	0
Middle Tennessee	3	–	2	–	0	7	–	4	–	0
Western Kentucky	2	–	3	–	0	6	–	4	–	0
Murray State	1	–	4	–	0	3	–	6	–	0
Morehead State	0	–	5	–	0	0	–	8	–	0
$ – Conference champion

1953 Oklahoma Collegiate Conference football standings
	Conf.					Overall
Team	W		L		T	W		L		T
Northeastern State $	4	–	0	–	1	7	–	1	–	1
SE Oklahoma State	3	–	1	–	1	3	–	4	–	1
Central State (OK)	3	–	2	–	0	6	–	3	–	0
East Central	2	–	3	–	0	2	–	7	–	0
SW Oklahoma State	1	–	4	–	0	4	–	6	–	0
NW Oklahoma State	1	–	4	–	0	3	–	6	–	0
$ – Conference champion

1953 Oregon Collegiate Conference football standings
	Conf.					Overall
Team	W		L		T	W		L		T
Oregon College $	3	–	0	–	0	4	–	4	–	0
Portland State	2	–	1	–	0	5	–	2	–	0
Oregon Tech	1	–	2	–	0	2	–	5	–	1
Eastern Oregon	0	–	3	–	0	1	–	7	–	0
$ – Conference champion

1953 Pennsylvania State Teachers College Conference football standings
	Conf.					Overall
Team	W		L		T	W		L		T
West Chester $	4	–	0	–	0	7	–	1	–	0
Shippensburg	6	–	0	–	0	8	–	0	–	0
Bloomsburg	3	–	1	–	0	6	–	2	–	0
Clarion	3	–	1	–	0	4	–	3	–	1
Indiana (PA)	3	–	2	–	0	4	–	4	–	0
East Stroudsburg	2	–	2	–	0	3	–	3	–	0
Slippery Rock	1	–	2	–	1	4	–	3	–	1
California (PA)	2	–	3	–	0	3	–	5	–	0
Mansfield	2	–	3	–	0	2	–	5	–	0
Cheyney	1	–	3	–	0	1	–	6	–	0
Lock Haven	4	–	4	–	0	4	–	4	–	0
Edinboro	1	–	3	–	1	3	–	5	–	1
Kutztown	2	–	4	–	0	1	–	5	–	2
Millersville	0	–	6	–	0	0	–	6	–	0
$ – Conference champion; Conference standings were based on the Saylor system of ratings.

1953 Rocky Mountain Conference football standings
	Conf.					Overall
Team	W		L		T	W		L		T
Idaho State $	5	–	0	–	0	6	–	2	–	0
Montana State	4	–	1	–	0	4	–	4	–	0
Western State (CO)	2	–	2	–	1	5	–	2	–	1
Colorado College	1	–	2	–	2	2	–	4	–	2
Colorado Mines	1	–	3	–	1	3	–	4	–	1
Colorado State–Greeley	0	–	5	–	0	2	–	5	–	0
$ – Conference champion

1953 South Dakota Intercollegiate Conference football standings
	Conf.					Overall
Team	W		L		T	W		L		T
Northern State $	6	–	0	–	0	8	–	0	–	0
Huron	5	–	2	–	0	6	–	3	–	0
Southern State (SD)	4	–	2	–	0	6	–	2	–	0
South Dakota Mines	4	–	2	–	0	4	–	4	–	1
Dakota Wesleyan	3	–	3	–	0	5	–	3	–	0
Yankton	3	–	4	–	0	3	–	5	–	0
Sioux Falls	1	–	4	–	0	2	–	5	–	0
Black Hills	1	–	5	–	0	2	–	7	–	0
General Beadle	0	–	5	–	0	0	–	6	–	0
$ – Conference champion

1953 Southeastern Athletic Conference football standings
	Conf.					Overall
Team	W		L		T	W		L		T
Claflin $	5	–	0	–	0	6	–	3	–	0
Florida Normal	2	–	2	–	0	?	–	?	–	?
Morris	3	–	2	–	0	6	–	3	–	0
Albany State	2	–	2	–	1	2	–	5	–	1
Paine	1	–	2	–	1	?	–	?	–	?
Savannah State	0	–	5	–	0	0	–	8	–	0
$ – Conference champion; Standings were based on Dickinson System ratings.

1953 Southern California Intercollegiate Athletic Conference football standings
	Conf.					Overall
Team	W		L		T	W		L		T
Pomona-Claremont +	3	–	1	–	0	7	–	1	–	0
Occidental +	3	–	1	–	0	6	–	2	–	0
Whittier	2	–	2	–	0	6	–	3	–	1
Redlands	2	–	2	–	0	6	–	4	–	0
Caltech	0	–	4	–	0	0	–	7	–	0
+ – Conference co-champions; Caltech played Pomona-Claremont and Redlands each two times; each game counted as one-half in the standings.

1953 Southern Intercollegiate Athletic Conference football standings
	Conf.					Overall
Team	W		L		T	W		L		T
No. 2 Florida A&M $	6	–	0	–	0	9	–	1	–	0
Morris Brown	3	–	1	–	1	4	–	5	–	1
South Carolina State	4	–	1	–	0	6	–	3	–	0
Fort Valley State	5	–	3	–	0	7	–	3	–	0
Bethune–Cookman	3	–	1	–	2	6	–	3	–	2
Clark (GA)	5	–	3	–	0	5	–	3	–	0
Xavier (LA)	2	–	2	–	1	4	–	4	–	1
Alabama A&M	4	–	4	–	0	4	–	5	–	0
Morehouse	3	–	3	–	0	5	–	3	–	0
Fisk	3	–	3	–	0	3	–	5	–	0
Alabama State	3	–	4	–	0	5	–	4	–	0
Benedict	3	–	5	–	0	4	–	5	–	0
Allen	0	–	3	–	1	3	–	5	–	2
Tuskegee	1	–	5	–	2	2	–	6	–	2
Knoxville	0	–	4	–	1	2	–	5	–	2
Lane	0	–	3	–	0	1	–	7	–	0
$ – Conference champion; Standings were based on Dickinson System ratings.; Rankings from Pittsburgh Courier

1953 Southwestern Athletic Conference football standings
	Conf.					Overall
Team	W		L		T	W		L		T
No. 1 Prairie View A&M $	6	–	0	–	0	12	–	0	–	0
No. 6 Southern	5	–	1	–	0	9	–	2	–	0
Texas College	4	–	2	–	0	5	–	4	–	0
Arkansas AM&N	2	–	3	–	1	3	–	5	–	2
Langston	2	–	4	–	0	3	–	6	–	0
Bishop	1	–	4	–	1	2	–	6	–	1
Wiley	0	–	6	–	0	2	–	7	–	0
$ – Conference champion; Rankings from Pittsburgh Courier

1953 Texas Conference football standings
	Conf.					Overall
Team	W		L		T	W		L		T
McMurry +	3	–	1	–	0	8	–	1	–	1
Abilene Christian +	3	–	1	–	0	7	–	3	–	0
Texas A&I +	3	–	1	–	0	4	–	5	–	0
Howard Payne	1	–	3	–	0	2	–	7	–	0
Austin	0	–	4	–	0	5	–	4	–	0
$ – Conference champion

1953 Virginia Little Six Conference football standings
	Conf.					Overall
Team	W		L		T	W		L		T
Hampden–Sydney $	3	–	0	–	0	5	–	1	–	1
Emory and Henry	1	–	1	–	0	6	–	5	–	0
Randolph–Macon	1	–	2	–	0	3	–	4	–	2
Bridgewater	0	–	2	–	0	3	–	3	–	0
$ – Conference champion

1953 West Virginia Intercollegiate Athletic Conference football standings
	Conf.					Overall
Team	W		L		T	W		L		T
Morris Harvey $	4	–	0	–	0	6	–	4	–	1
West Liberty State	6	–	1	–	0	6	–	2	–	0
Fairmont State	4	–	2	–	0	5	–	2	–	0
Concord	4	–	2	–	0	4	–	3	–	1
Potomac State	3	–	4	–	0	3	–	4	–	0
Glenville State	3	–	4	–	0	3	–	4	–	0
West Virginia Tech	1	–	3	–	0	1	–	7	–	0
West Virginia Wesleyan	1	–	4	–	0	1	–	4	–	0
Salem	0	–	7	–	0	0	–	8	–	0
Bethany (WV) *	1	–	0	–	0	3	–	4	–	0
Shepherd *	1	–	1	–	0	2	–	5	–	1
$ – Conference champion; * – Did not qualify for conference standings Conference standings based on power ratings

1953 Wisconsin State College Conference football standings
	Conf.					Overall
Team	W		L		T	W		L		T
La Crosse State +	5	–	0	–	0	9	–	0	–	1
Platteville State +	4	–	0	–	0	6	–	0	–	0
River Falls State	3	–	1	–	0	5	–	2	–	0
Stevens Point State	4	–	2	–	0	5	–	3	–	0
Eau Claire State	4	–	3	–	0	5	–	3	–	0
Whitewater State	2	–	3	–	0	2	–	4	–	0
Milwaukee State	2	–	3	–	0	2	–	6	–	0
Superior State	1	–	3	–	0	3	–	4	–	0
Stout Institute	0	–	5	–	0	1	–	7	–	0
Oshkosh State	0	–	5	–	0	0	–	6	–	0
+ – Conference co-champions

1953 Yankee Conference football standings
	Conf.					Overall
Team	W		L		T	W		L		T
New Hampshire +	3	–	1	–	0	6	–	2	–	0
Rhode Island +	3	–	1	–	0	6	–	2	–	0
Connecticut	2	–	1	–	1	3	–	4	–	1
Maine	1	–	2	–	1	4	–	2	–	1
Vermont	0	–	1	–	0	3	–	3	–	1
UMass	0	–	3	–	0	1	–	7	–	0
+ – Conference co-champions

== Bowl games ==
=== Major bowls ===
Bowl game	Winning team		Losing team	
Cotton Bowl	No. 6 Rice	28	No. 13 Alabama	6
Orange Bowl	No. 4 Oklahoma	7	No. 1 Maryland	0
Rose Bowl	No. 3 Michigan State	28	No. 5 UCLA Bruins	20
Sugar Bowl	No. 8 Georgia Tech	42	No. 10 West Virginia	19

=== Other bowls ===
Bowl game	Winning team		Losing team	
Gator Bowl	No. 12 Texas Tech	35	No. 17 Auburn	13
Sun Bowl	Texas Western	37	Mississippi Southern	14
Tangerine Bowl	Arkansas State	7	East Texas State	7

== Heisman Trophy voting ==
The Heisman Trophy is given to the year's most outstanding player

Player	School	Position	1st	2nd	3rd	Total
Johnny Lattner	Notre Dame	HB	384	283	132	1,850
Paul Giel	Minnesota	HB	366	295	106	1,794
Paul Cameron	UCLA	HB	44	89	134	444
Bernie Faloney	Maryland	QB	46	34	52	258
Bobby Garrett	Stanford	QB	32	43	49	231
Alan Ameche	Wisconsin	FB	25	38	60	211
J. C. Caroline	Illinois	HB	15	37	74	193
J. D. Roberts	Oklahoma	G	6	21	48	108
Lamar McHan	Arkansas	QB	15	12	9	78
Steve Meilinger	Kentucky	E	12	10	9	65

== Statistical leaders ==
=== Individual ===
==== Total offense ====
The following players were the individual leaders in total offense among major college football players during the 1953 season:
1. Paul Larson, California, 1,572 yards
2. Lamar McHan, Arkansas, 1,516 yards
3. Joe Mastrogiovanni, Wyoming, 1,514 yards
4. Bobby Garrett, Stanford, 1,502 yards
5. Zeke Bratkowski, Georgia, 1,416 yards
6. Paul Giel, Minnesota, 1,339 yards
7. Richard "Iron Man" Carr, Columbia, 1,262 yards
8. J. C. Caroline, Illinois, 1,256 yards
9. Sandy Lederman, Washington, 1,133 yards
10. Don Ellis, Texas A&M, 1,128 yards

==== Passing ====
The following players were the individual leaders in pass completions among major college football players during the 1953 season:
1. Bobby Garrett, Stanford, 118 of 205 (57.6%), 1,637 yards, 10 interceptions, 17 touchdowns
2. Zeke Bratkowski, Georgia, 113 of 224 (50.4%), 1,461 yards, 23 interceptions, 6 touchdowns
3. Sandy Lederman, Washington, 92 of 189 (48.7%), 1,157 yards, 14 interceptions, 8 touchdowns
4. Paul Larson, California, 85 of 171 (49.7%), 1,431 yards, 16 interceptions, 6 touchdowns
5. Tony Rados, Penn State, 81 of 171 (47.4%), 1,025 yards, 12 interceptions, 8 touchdowns
6. Don Rydalch, Utah, 78 of 128 (60.9%), 980 yards, 8 interceptions, 7 touchdowns
7. Lamar McHan, Arkansas, 78 of 150 (52.0%), 1,107 yards, 11 interceptions, 8 touchdowns
8. Richard "Iron Man" Carr, Columbia, 77 of 191 (40.3%), 1,367 yards, 18 interceptions, 13 touchdowns
9. Don Ellis, Texas A&M, 76 of 171 (44.4%), 950 yards, 14 interceptions, 4 touchdowns
10. Dick Thomas, Northwestern, 74 of 145 (51.0%), 933 yards, 7 interceptions, 5 touchdowns
10. Cotton Davidson, Baylor, 74 of 156 (47.4%), 1,092 yards, 16 interceptions, 9 touchdowns

==== Rushing ====
The following players were the individual leaders in rushing yards among major college football players during the 1953 season:
1. J. C. Caroline, Illinois, 1,256 yards on 194 carries (6.47 average)
2. Kosse Johnson, Rice, 944 yards on 187 carries (5.05 average)
3. Kenny Cardella, Arizona, 915 yards on 148 carries (6.18 average)
4. Bobby Watkins, Ohio State, 875 yards on 153 carries (5.72 average)
5. Neil Worden, Notre Dame, 859 yards on 145 carries (5.92 average)
6. Dicky Moegle, Rice, 833 yards on 114 carries (7.31 average)
7. Alan Ameche, Wisconsin, 801 yards on 165 carries (4.85 average)
8. Larry Grigg, Oklahoma, 792 yards on 130 carries (6.09 average)
9. Bobby Cavazos, Texas Tech, 757 yards on 97 carries (7.80 average)
10. Chet Hanulak, Maryland, 753 yards on 77 carries (9.78 average)

==== Receiving ====
The following players were the individual leaders in receptions among major college football players during the 1953 season:
1. Johnny Carson, Georgia, 45 receptions, 663 yards, 4 touchdowns
2. Ken Buck, Pacific, 45 receptions, 660 yards, 5 touchdowns
3. Sam Morley, Stanford, 45 receptions, 594 yards, 6 touchdowns
4. John Steinberg, Stanford, 32 receptions, 425 yards, 3 touchdowns
5. Dave McLaughlin, Dartmouth, 31 receptions, 592 yards, 6 touchdowns
6. Floyd Sagely, Arkansas, 30 receptions, 542 yards, 3 touchdowns
6. John Allen, Arizona State, 30 receptions, 505 yards, 8 touchdowns
6. Chet Lyssy, Hardin-Simmons, 30 receptions, 389 yards, 5 touchdowns
6. Jim Garrity, Penn State, 30 receptions, 349 yards, 3 touchdowns
10. Dale Hopp, Columbia, 29 receptions, 437 yards, 4 touchdowns
10. Andy Nacrelli, Fordham, 29 receptions, 428 yards, 3 touchowns

==== Scoring ====
The following players were the individual leaders in scoring among major college football players during the 1953 season:
1. Earl Lindley, Utah State, 81 points (13 TD, 3 PAT)
2. Bobby Cavazos, Texas Tech, 80 points (13 TD, 2 PAT)
3. Larry Grigg, Oklahoma, 78 points (13 TD)
3. Fred Mahaffey, Denver, 78 points (13 TD)
3. Johnny Mapp, VMI, 78 points (13 TD)
6. Burgmeier, Detroit, 72 points (12 TD)
6. Cameron, UCLA, 72 points (12 TD)
8. Lewis, Texas Tech, 67 points (11 TD, 1 PAT)
8. Joe Mastrogiovanni, 67 points (9 TD, 13 PAT)
10. Bates, Illinois, 66 points (11 TD)
10. Gatewood, Drake, 66 points (11 TD)
10. Talley, California, 66 points (11 TD)

=== Team ===
==== Total offense ====
The following teams were the leaders in total offense in major college football during the 1953 season:
1. Cincinnati, 409.5 yards per game
2. Notre Dame, 383.9 yards per game
3. West Virginia, 377.6 yards per game
4. Texas Tech, 376.5 yards per game
5. Utah, 375.1 yards per game
6. Maryland, 359.5 yards per game
7. Rice, 358.6 yards per game
8. Illinois, 356.1 yards per game
9. Oklahoma, 352.1 yards per game
10. Army, 348.4 yards per game

==== Total defense ====
The following teams were the leaders in total defense in major college football during the 1954 season:
1. Cincinnati, 184.3 yards per game
2. UCLA, 188.4 yards per game
3. Maryland, 193.2 yards per game
4. Yale, 194.9 yards per game
5. Syracuse, 196.6 yards per game
6. Oklahoma, 196.9 yards per game
7. Texas Western, 198.6 yards per game
8. Wichita, 198.8 yards per game
9. Detroit, 199.6 yards per game
10. West Virginia, 203.9 yards per game

== See also ==
- 1953 College Football All-America Team
