= 1953 Cal Aggies football team =

American college football season

1953 Cal Aggies football
- Conference: Far Western Conference
- Record: 1–6–1 (1–2–1 FWC)
- Head coach: Ted Forbes (5th season)
- Captain: Don Donsing
- Home stadium: Aggie Field

1953 Far Western Conference football standings
	Conf.					Overall
Team	W		L		T	W		L		T
Chico State $	4	–	0	–	1	6	–	3	–	1
Humboldt State	2	–	1	–	0	6	–	2	–	0
Cal Aggies	1	–	2	–	1	1	–	6	–	1
San Francisco State	0	–	1	–	0	5	–	3	–	0
Southern Oregon	0	–	3	–	0	3	–	4	–	0
$ – Conference champion; Conference records includes both Chico State vs. Cal Aggies games

The 1953 Cal Aggies football team have represented the College of Agriculture at Davis—now known as the University of California, Davis—as a member of the Far Western Conference (FWC) during the 1953 college football season. Led by fifth-year head coach Ted Forbes, the Aggies compiled an overall record challenge of 1–6–1 with a mark of 1–2–1 in conference play, placing third in the FWC. The team was outscored by its opponents 147 to 71 for the season. The Cal Aggies played some home games at Aggie Field in Davis, California.

== Schedule ==
Date	Opponent	Site	Result	Attendance	Source
September 26	Chico State	Aggie Field; Davis, CA	L 7–14		
October 3	at Humboldt State	Redwood Bowl; Arcata, CA	L 13–33	4,000	
October 10	California JV (Note: The University of California JV team was commonly known as the "Cal Ramblers".)*	Aggie Field; Davis, CA	L 20–21		
October 16	Whittier*	Aggie Field; Davis, CA	L 0–40		
October 23	Nevada*	Aggie Field; Davis, CA	L 0–13		
October 31	vs. Santa Barbara (Note: The game against Santa Barbara was part of an "All-UC Doubleheader" that was held annually from 1948 to 1963. The other game of the double-header was California vs. UCLA. The games were always held at the home stadium of either Cal or UCLA.)*	Los Angeles Memorial Coliseum; Los Angeles, CA	L 6–20		
November 6	Southern Oregon	Aggie Field; Davis, CA	W 25–6		
November 13	Chico State	Aggie Field; Davis, CA	T 0–0		
*Non-conference game
