= 1953 Santa Barbara Gauchos football team =

American college football season

1953 Santa Barbara Gauchos football
- Conference: California Collegiate Athletic Association
- Record: 2–6–1 (1–4 CCAA)
- Head coach: Stan Williamson (6th season)
- Home stadium: La Playa Stadium

1953 California Collegiate Athletic Association football standings
	Conf.					Overall
Team	W		L		T	W		L		T
Cal Poly $	5	–	0	–	0	9	–	0	–	0
San Diego State	3	–	1	–	1	5	–	3	–	1
Fresno State	2	–	2	–	1	4	–	4	–	2
Pepperdine	2	–	3	–	0	3	–	6	–	0
Santa Barbara	1	–	4	–	0	2	–	6	–	1
Los Angeles State	1	–	4	–	0	2	–	7	–	0
$ – Conference champion

The 1953 UC Santa Barbara Gauchos football team represented Santa Barbara College (Note: University of California, Santa Barbara was known as Santa Barbara College of the University of California from 1944 to 1957.) during the 1953 college football season.

Santa Barbara competed in the California Collegiate Athletic Association (CCAA). The team was led by sixth-year head coach Stan Williamson, and played home games at La Playa Stadium in Santa Barbara, California. They finished the season with a record of two wins, six losses and one tie (2–6–1, 1–4 CCAA).

== Schedule ==
Date	Opponent	Site	Result	Attendance	Source
September 25	Whittier*	La Playa Stadium; Santa Barbara, CA	T 7–7		
October 2	Occidental*	La Playa Stadium; Santa Barbara, CA	L 0–6		
October 10	at Cal Poly	Mustang Stadium; San Luis Obispo, CA	L 6–59		
October 17	Los Angeles State	La Playa Stadium; Santa Barbara, CA	W 21–12		
October 24	at Fresno State	Ratcliffe Stadium; Fresno, CA	L 0–20	7,188	
October 31	vs. Cal Aggies (Note: The game against the Cal Aggies was part of an "All-UC Doubleheader" that was held annually from 1948 to 1963. The other game of the double-header was California vs. UCLA. The games were always held at the home stadium of either Cal or UCLA.)*	Los Angeles Memorial Coliseum; Los Angeles, CA	W 20–6		
November 6	Pepperdine	La Playa Stadium; Santa Barbara, CA	L 12–13		
November 14	at San Francisco State*	Cox Stadium; San Francisco, CA	L 13–26		
November 21	at San Diego State	Aztec Bowl; San Diego, CA	L 0–72	7,000	
*Non-conference game
