= Ed Chinske =

American sports coach (1904–1967)

Biographical details
- Born: September 9, 1904
- Died: June 27, 1967 (aged 62); Missoula, Montana, U.S.

Playing career

Football
- 1926–1928: Montana

Basketball
- 1927–1930: Montana

Coaching career (HC unless noted)

Football
- 1930–1935: Custer County HS (MT)
- 1936–1945: Sentinel HS (MT)
- 1946–1951: Montana (freshmen)
- 1952–1954: Montana

Basketball
- 1930–1936: Custer County HS (MT)
- 1942–1943: Montana (co-head coach)
- 1946–1951: Montana (freshmen)

Baseball
- 1947–1952: Montana

Head coaching record
- Overall: 8–18–1 (college football); 15–9 (college basketball); 69–62–1 (college baseball)

Edward S. Chinske (September 9, 1904 – June 27, 1967) was an American football, basketball, baseball, and golf coach. He served as the head football coach at the University of Montana from 1952 to 1954, compiling a record of 8–18–1. Chinske was also the head baseball coach at Montana from 1947 to 1952, tallying a mark of 69–62–1.

Chinske died on June 27, 1967, after suffering an apparent heart attack while playing golf in Missoula, Montana.

== Head coaching record ==
=== College football ===
Year	Team	Overall	Conference	Standing	Bowl/playoffs
Montana Grizzlies (Skyline Conference) (1952–1954)
1952	Montana	2–7–1	1–5	7th	
1953	Montana	3–5	2–4	6th	
1954	Montana	3–6	1–5	7th	
Montana:		8–18–1	4–14		
Total:		8–18–1			
