= Don Stalwick =

American football player and coach (1930–2014)

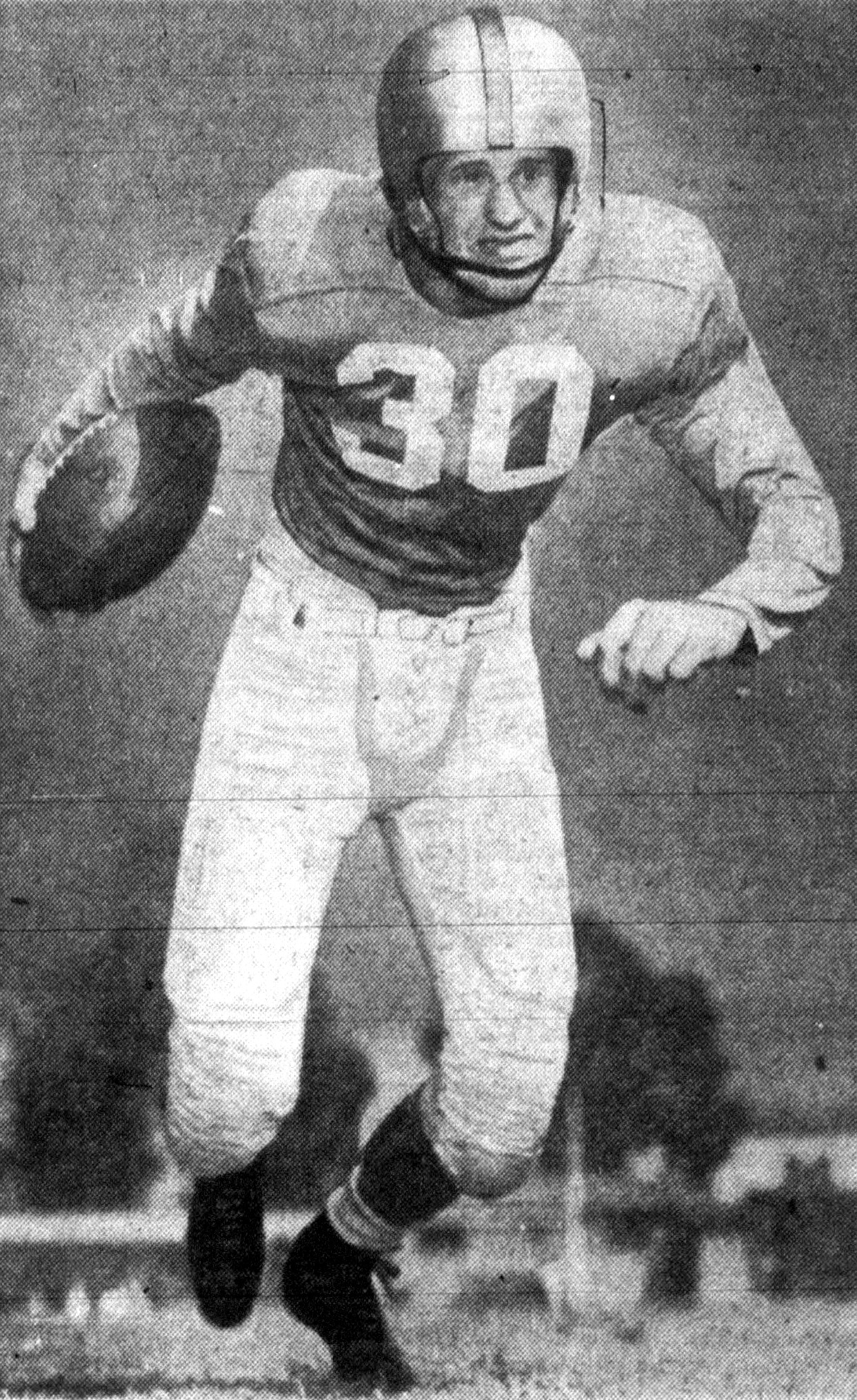
- Stalwick, circa 1953

Biographical details
- Born: August 29, 1930; Aberdeen, Washington, U.S.
- Died: May 7, 2014 (aged 83); Claremont, California, U.S.

Playing career
- 1951–1953: UCLA
- 1954: COMPHIBPAC San Diego
- Position: Halfback

Coaching career (HC unless noted)
- 1955: UCLA (freshmen)
- 1956–1957: Hart HS (CA)
- 1958–1962: Utah (assistant)
- 1963–1964: Colorado (backfield)
- 1965–1967: Claremont-Mudd

Head coaching record
- Overall: 5–23 (college)

Donald Wallace Stalwick (December 29, 1930 – May 7, 2014) was an American football player and coach. From 1965 to 1967, he served as the head coach of the Claremont-Mudd-Scripps Stags football program that comprises students from Claremont McKenna College, Harvey Mudd College, and Scripps College. Stalwick played college football at the University of California, Los Angeles (UCLA), lettering from 1951 to 1953 at halfback on teams led by head coach Henry Russell Sanders. He was a starter for the 1953 UCLA Bruins football team, which won the Pacific Coast Conference title and played in the 1954 Rose Bowl. Stalwick was an assistant football coach at the University of Utah from 1958 to 1962 and backfield coach at the University of Colorado from 1963 to 1964.

Stalwick was born on December 29, 1930, in Aberdeen, Washington. He was raised in Wallace, Idaho, where he graduated from Wallace High School in 1949. Stalwick died on May 7, 2014, in Claremont, California.

== Head coaching record ==
=== College ===
Year	Team	Overall	Conference	Standing	Bowl/playoffs
Claremont-Mudd Stags (Southern California Intercollegiate Athletic Conference) (1965–1967)
1965	Claremont-Mudd	2–7	1–3	5th	
1966	Claremont-Mudd	1–8	1–4	5th	
1967	Claremont-Mudd	2–7	2–3	5th	
Claremont-Mudd:		5–23	4–10		
Total:		5–23			
