= Mack Flenniken =

American football player and coach (1905–1956)

Biographical details
- Born: January 24, 1905; Fort Worth, Texas, U.S.
- Died: May 26, 1956 (aged 51); Geneva, Pennsylvania, U.S.

Playing career
- c. 1924: Centenary
- 1926–1927: Geneva
- 1930: Chicago Cardinals
- 1931: New York Giants
- Position: Back

Coaching career (HC unless noted)
- 1928–1929: Geneva
- 1951–1953: Idaho (assistant)

Head coaching record
- Overall: 7–11–1

George M. "Mack" Flenniken (January 24, 1905 – May 26, 1956) was an American football player and coach. He played professionally in the National Football League (NFL) with the Chicago Cardinals in 1930 and the New York Giants in 1931. Flenniken served as the head football coach at Geneva College from 1928 to 1929, compiling a record of 7–11–1. He played college football at Centenary College of Louisiana and at Geneva.

== Playing career ==
=== College football ===
Flenniken played college football for Centenary College of Louisiana in Shreveport and then at Geneva College in 1926 and 1927. His college career mirrored Cal Hubbard who played for both colleges and also later became a coach at Geneva. Both players followed Bo McMillin, who coached first at Centenary and then later at Geneva.

=== Chicago Cardinals ===
Flenniken got his start in the NFL with the Chicago Cardinals in 1930. He was a flexible player on both sides of the ball, recording three rushing touchdowns and also showing a threat using the forward pass and picked up an interception while playing defense. At Chicago, he played alongside future hall of famer Ernie Nevers.

=== New York Giants ===
In 1931, Flenniken moved to the New York Giants, where he was a part of the "committee of quarterbacks" along with Red Smith and Hap Moran. For the Giants, Flenniken saw less playing time but in his four games and one start he recorded successes in both passing and rushing.

== Coaching career ==
Flenniken was the 14th head football coach at Geneva College in Beaver Falls, Pennsylvania and he held that position for two seasons, from 1928 until 1929. His coaching record at Geneva was 7–11–1.

He was an assistant coach in the Pacific Coast Conference for three seasons at Idaho under Babe Curfman, from 1951 through 1953.

== Head coaching record ==
Year	Team	Overall	Conference	Standing	Bowl/playoffs
Geneva Covenanters (Tri-State Conference) (1928–1929)
1928	Geneva	5–5	3–1	3rd	
1929	Geneva	2–6–1	1–3	5th	
Geneva:		7–11–1	4–4		
Total:		7–11–1			
