= 1953 Pepperdine Waves football team =

American college football season

1953 Pepperdine Waves football
- Conference: California Collegiate Athletic Association
- Record: 3–6 (2–3 CCAA)
- Head coach: Gordon McEachron (1st season)
- Home stadium: El Camino Stadium

1953 California Collegiate Athletic Association football standings
	Conf.					Overall
Team	W		L		T	W		L		T
Cal Poly $	5	–	0	–	0	9	–	0	–	0
San Diego State	3	–	1	–	1	5	–	3	–	1
Fresno State	2	–	2	–	1	4	–	4	–	2
Pepperdine	2	–	3	–	0	3	–	6	–	0
Santa Barbara	1	–	4	–	0	2	–	6	–	1
Los Angeles State	1	–	4	–	0	2	–	7	–	0
$ – Conference champion

The 1953 Pepperdine Waves football team represented George Pepperdine College (Note: Pepperdine University was known as George Pepperdine College from 1937 to 1970.) as a member of the California Collegiate Athletic Association (CCAA) during the 1953 college football season. The team was led by first-year head coach Gordon McEachron and played home games at El Camino Stadium on the campus of El Camino College in Torrance, California. They finished the season with an overall record of 3–6 and a mark of 2–3 in conference play, placing fourth in the CCAA.

On December 7, 1953, Pepperdine announced that they were withdrawing from the CCAA in order to "seek its own level" in the field of athletics.

== Schedule ==
Date	Opponent	Site	Result	Attendance	Source
September 26	La Verne*	El Camino Stadium; Torrance, CA	W 12–0		
October 10	San Diego State	El Camino Stadium; Torrance, CA	L 0–6	4,000	
October 16	at Occidental*	D.W. Patterson Field; Los Angeles, CA (Black and Blue Game)	L 12–20		
October 24	Cal Poly^{†}	El Camino Stadium; Torrance, CA	L 0–45		
October 31	San Francisco State*	El Camino Stadium; Torrance, CA	L 6–13		
November 6	at Santa Barbara	La Playa Stadium; Santa Barbara, CA	W 13–12		
November 14	Fresno State	Ratcliffe Stadium; Fresno, CA	L 2–54	5,224	
November 20	at Los Angeles State	Snyder Field; Los Angeles, CA ("Old Shoe" rivalry)	W 13–7		
November 28	at Whittier*	Hadley Field; Whittier, CA	L 13–40		
*Non-conference game; ^{†}Homecoming
