= 1953 Humboldt State Lumberjacks football team =

American college football season

1953 Humboldt State Lumberjacks football
- Conference: Far Western Conference
- Record: 6–2 (2–1 FWC)
- Head coach: Phil Sarboe (3rd season)
- Home stadium: Redwood Bowl

1953 Far Western Conference football standings
	Conf.					Overall
Team	W		L		T	W		L		T
Chico State $	4	–	0	–	1	6	–	3	–	1
Humboldt State	2	–	1	–	0	6	–	2	–	0
Cal Aggies	1	–	2	–	1	1	–	6	–	1
San Francisco State	0	–	1	–	0	5	–	3	–	0
Southern Oregon	0	–	3	–	0	3	–	4	–	0
$ – Conference champion; Conference records includes both Chico State vs. Cal Aggies games

The 1953 Humboldt State Lumberjacks football team represented Humboldt State College—now known as California State Polytechnic University, Humboldt—as a member of the Far Western Conference (FWC) during the 1953 college football season. Led by third-year head coach Phil Sarboe, the Lumberjacks compiled an overall record of 6–2 with a mark of 2–1 in conference play, placing second in the FWC, and outscored their opponents 122–39 to for the season. The defense yielded more than a touchdown in only two games and had four shutouts. The team played home games at the Redwood Bowl in Arcata, California.

== Schedule ==
Date	Opponent	Site	Result	Attendance	Source
September 12	Hamilton Field (Note: Hamilton Army Airfield was a United States Air Force Base from 1934 to 1974.)*	Redwood Bowl; Arcata, CA	L 0–6	4,000	
September 19	at Pacific Lutheran*	Tacoma, WA	W 7–0	3,000	
September 26	Oregon Tech*	Redwood Bowl; Arcata, CA	W 22–0		
October 3	Cal Aggies^{†}	Redwood Bowl; Arcata, CA	W 33–13	4,000	
October 10	at Southern Oregon	Fuller Field; Ashland, OR	W 21–6		
October 17	Oregon freshmen*	Redwood Bowl; Arcata, CA	W 13–0		
October 24	Oregon College*	Redwood Bowl; Arcata, CA	W 13–0		
October 31	at Chico State	Chico High School Stadium; Chico, CA	L 13–14	4,100	
*Non-conference game; ^{†}Homecoming
