= 1953 Cal Poly San Dimas Broncos football team =

American college football season

1953 Cal Poly San Dimas Broncos football
- Conference: Independent
- Record: 2–6
- Head coach: Staley Pitts (1st season)

1953 Western college football independents records
	Conf.			Overall
Team	W	L	T	W		L		T
Pacific (CA)		–		4	–	4	–	2
San Jose State		–		4	–	4	–	1
Hawaii		–		5	–	6	–	0
Nevada		–		2	–	3	–	0
La Verne		–		3	–	7	–	0
Cal Poly San Dimas		–		2	–	6	–	0

The 1953 Cal Poly San Dimas Broncos football team represented the Cal Poly Kellogg-Voorhis Unit—now known as California State Polytechnic University, Pomona—as an independent during the 1953 college football season. Led by first-year head coach Staley Pitts, Cal Poly San Dimas compiled a record of 2–6. The team was outscored by its opponents 179 to 71 for the season.

== Schedule ==
Date	Opponent	Site	Result
October 3	Oceanside-Carlsbad	Oceanside, CA	L 0–12
October 10	at Chino Institute for Men	Chino, CA	W 13–6
October 17	at Pomona	Claremont Alumni Field; Claremont, CA	L 0–40
October 23	California Baptist	Bonita High School; La Verne, CA	W 18–0
October 31	at La Verne	Bonita High School; La Verne, CA	L 13–48
November 7	at Redlands	Redlands Stadium (Note: This stadium is the predecessor to the current Ted Runner Stadium on the University of Redlands campus, which was opened for the 1968 season); Redlands, CA	L 6–41
November 14	Palomar	Escondido, CA	L 6–14
November 20	Imperial Valley	Bonita High School; La Verne, CA	L 15–18
