= Reser Stadium =

Outdoor athletic stadium in Corvallis, Oregon

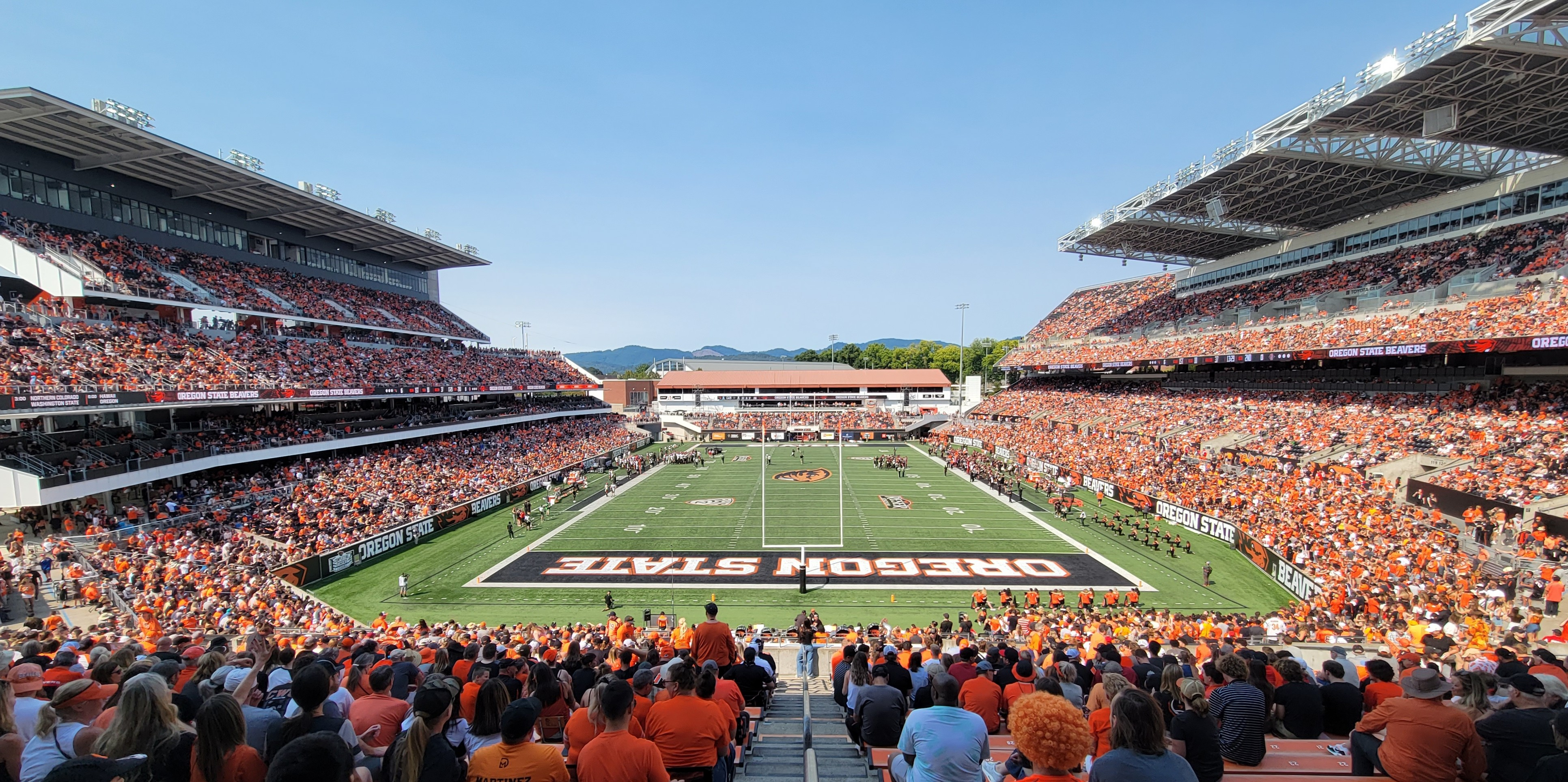
- View from southeast end zone in 2023

- Location within the United States Location within Oregon
- Interactive map of Reser Stadium
- Former names: Parker Stadium (1953–June 1999)
- Address: 2600 SW Western Blvd
- Location: Oregon State University; Corvallis, Oregon, U.S.
- Coordinates: 44.559°N 123.281°W
- Elevation: 240 feet (73 m) AMSL
- Owner: Oregon State University
- Operator: Oregon State University
- Capacity: 35,548 (2023–present) Former capacity: List: 26,407 (2021-2022); 43,363 (2017–2021); 45,674 (2007–2015); 43,300 (2005–2006); 35,362 (1990–2004); 40,593 (1967–1989); 33,000 (1965–1966); 28,000 (1958–1964); 25,000 (1953–1957)
- Surface: FieldTurf (2005–present) Former surfaces: List: AstroTurf (1999–2004); All-Pro Turf (1984–1998); AstroTurf (1969–1983); Natural grass (1953–1968)

Construction
- Groundbreaking: September 1952
- Opened: November 14, 1953; 72 years ago
- Renovated: 2005, 2007, 2016, 2021-23
- Expanded: 1958, 1965, 1967, 2005
- Cost: $1 million ($12 million in 2025) $80 million (2005 renovation)
- Architects: Moffatt, Nichol & Taylor; HNTB (renovations)
- General contractors: Wall, Bertram and Sanford

Tenants
- Oregon State Beavers (NCAA) (1953–present)

Website
- osubeavers.com/reser-stadium

Reser Stadium is an outdoor athletic stadium on the campus of Oregon State University in Corvallis, Oregon, United States. The home of the Oregon State Beavers of the Pac-12 Conference, it opened in 1953 as Parker Stadium and was renamed in 1999. At 12-13 stories and 135 ft (41 m) tall, it is the tallest man-made structure in Corvallis and Benton County history and the tallest building between Eugene, Oregon, and the Salem metropolitan area.

Renovations for a new southwest grandstand decreased the seating capacity to 35,548 starting with the 2023 season. The FieldTurf playing field runs northwest to southeast, at an approximate elevation of 240 feet (73 m) above sea level, with the press box above the grandstand on the southwest sideline.

== History and use ==
From 1910 to 1953, the Beavers played their home games at Bell Field (now the site of the Dixon Recreation Center) and also played as many as four games a year at Multnomah Stadium (now Providence Park) in Portland. In 1948, Oregon State president August L. Strand, athletic director Spec Keene, and Portland businessman Charles T. Parker (1885–1977) met to plan a replacement for Bell Field. Parker, a 1907 alumnus, kicked off the stadium fundraising campaign in 1949 and made significant contributions of his own. In 1952, construction of the stadium began; for Parker's efforts and contributions, the stadium was named in his honor. The first game was played on Homecoming, November 14, 1953, and the Beavers defeated Washington State 7–0. At the time, it seated 28,000.

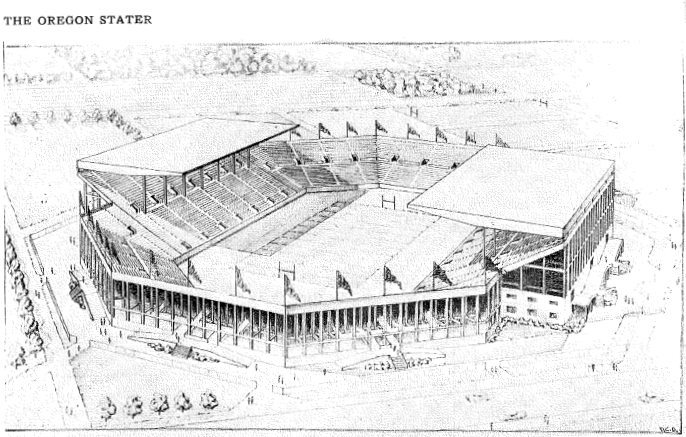
Architectural rendering of the proposed Parker Stadium, 1950

Parker was renovated in 1958, 1965, and 1967, reaching a capacity of approximately 40,500 seats, but the architect's full intent never came to fruition. The roof over the main southwest grandstand was approved in 1988, and with the completion of the original Valley Football Center behind the northwest end zone, capacity was reduced to 35,362 in 1990; the roof and new press box were completed in 1991.

The stadium was renamed in June 1999 to honor Al and Pat Reser, owners of Reser's Fine Foods. The couple both graduated from Oregon State in 1960, and are major donors to the university and Beavers athletics, though Al died at the age of 74 in 2010. The Parker name is still honored at Parker Plaza, located between Reser and Gill Coliseum, the site of many pregame activities.

The stadium is located on the southwest corner of the Oregon State campus at the intersection of SW 26th Street and SW Western Boulevard in Corvallis. In addition to football, intramural and club sports also use the facility occasionally.

Reser stadium (then Parker stadium) was originally considered to be one of the four west regional sites of the 1994 FIFA World Cup in 1987 before the total number of sites was whittled from 18 to 9.

Reser Stadium alternates with Autzen Stadium at the University of Oregon in hosting the annual rivalry game with the Ducks. Since 1954, the games in even-numbered years have been played in Corvallis and odd-numbered years in Eugene .

=== Playing surface ===
Through the 1968 season, the stadium's playing surface was natural grass. AstroTurf was installed in 1969, and replaced in 1974 and 1977. The brand was switched to All-Pro artificial turf in 1984, which was in place for 15 seasons, replaced in 1999 with AstroTurf 12/2000. Infilled FieldTurf debuted in 2005, and was replaced prior to the 2012 season.

== Expansion and upgrades ==
Through the 2004 season, the official capacity of the stadium stood at 35,362. In 2003 the Raising Reser campaign was initiated, which resulted in an increase of seating capacity to 43,300 for the 2005 season by way of constructing a new grandstand along the northeast sideline. "Phase Two" of the Raising Reser project was completed between the 2006 and 2007 football seasons; it enclosed the horseshoe in the southeast end zone with continuous seating in the corners. This addition raised total seating capacity to 45,674 and included the 150-by-30-foot (46 m × 9 m) ProStar Digital VideoPlus Display screen.

During the planned Phase Three, the upper level will extend through the southwest grandstand.

The north end zone is also home to the Valley Football Center, which houses a large weight room, offices and meeting facilities, reserved primarily for coaches and administrators within the football program. In December 2014, Victory Through Valley, an expansion to the stadium and Valley Football Center was announced as part of $42 million in upgrades. The renovations were scheduled to begin in Fall 2015 and were completed by the beginning of the 2016 football season. Victory Through Valley upgrades included a new auditorium, coaches offices, team room, locker room, rehab facilities, and hall of fame. The new additions and upgrades have helped with recruiting, competitiveness, and functionality.

On February 4, 2021, renovations for the outdated 16,956-seat southwest grandstand were revealed to the public. Construction began on December 1, 2021, and will be completed in time for the 2023 football season. Although the renovation ultimately lowered Reser Stadium's total capacity to 35,548, the new grandstand is larger in size than its predecessor.

== Notable Features ==
=== Large Oversized Chainsaw ===
There is an oversized chainsaw standing in the Reser’s Terrace section. “For us, the chainsaw is an in-venue piece, that goes down well in front of a home crowd at Reser Stadium,” said Sara Elcano, senior associate athletic director of external operations.

=== Retired Numbers ===
Heisman Trophy winner Terry Baker's number "11" is currently the only retired number hanging on the Valley Football Center overlooking the Reser Terrace section in the north end zone. And, although not a retired number Oregon State has "AL" displayed opposite Terry Baker's number "11" for long time donor/philanthropist/contributor Al Reser.

=== IronMan Statue ===
A large statue in the southwest end zone corner of the stadium was placed in 2003 to commemorate the 1933 'Iron Men' Team.

On Oct. 21, 1933, using only 11 players the full 60 minutes, Oregon State College held two-time defending national champion and No. 1-ranked USC to a scoreless tie, thus ending the nation's longest winning streak at 25. It is believed this is the only time in NCAA history that a defending national champion and No. 1-ranked school was toppled from the ranks by a team using only 11 men the entire game.

The sculpture was donated by William "Bill" Tomsheck: The last surviving Ironman member and long-time Corvallis, OR resident.

=== "Beaver Fans 1" Sculpture ===
Visitors to Reser Stadium are welcomed with two eye-catching bronze sculptures of real-life fans celebrating the Oregon State Beavers football team as they enter the east sideline entrance. They literally pop out of the brick towers they are mounted to, and the scene is of a celebratory nature, with various people yelling or smiling, men and women, most likely for a Beaver touchdown. "Beaver Fans 1" is the first of two commissioned pieces; this sculpture was constructed in 2006 by artist and Professor of Art Emeritus Tom Morandi as part of a competition he applied for and won for Oregon's One Percent for Art Program. One percent of the cost of new state buildings in Oregon is required to be used towards the purchase of art.

=== Electric Field Sculpture ===
Electric Field is a large metal football sculpture that is defined by linear metal and ornamented by lighted Xs and triangles that sits at an angle atop a brushed metal base in the plaza of Reser Stadium. Dennis Oppenheim completed the Sculpture in 2006, and described his piece, Electric Field, by "using the universally beautiful geometry of the football to contain the dynamic of the game by showing many different strategic movements experienced during a game. These field actions are represented by symbols of the players in the form of geometric shapes and lines of light which connect them."

== Attendance records ==
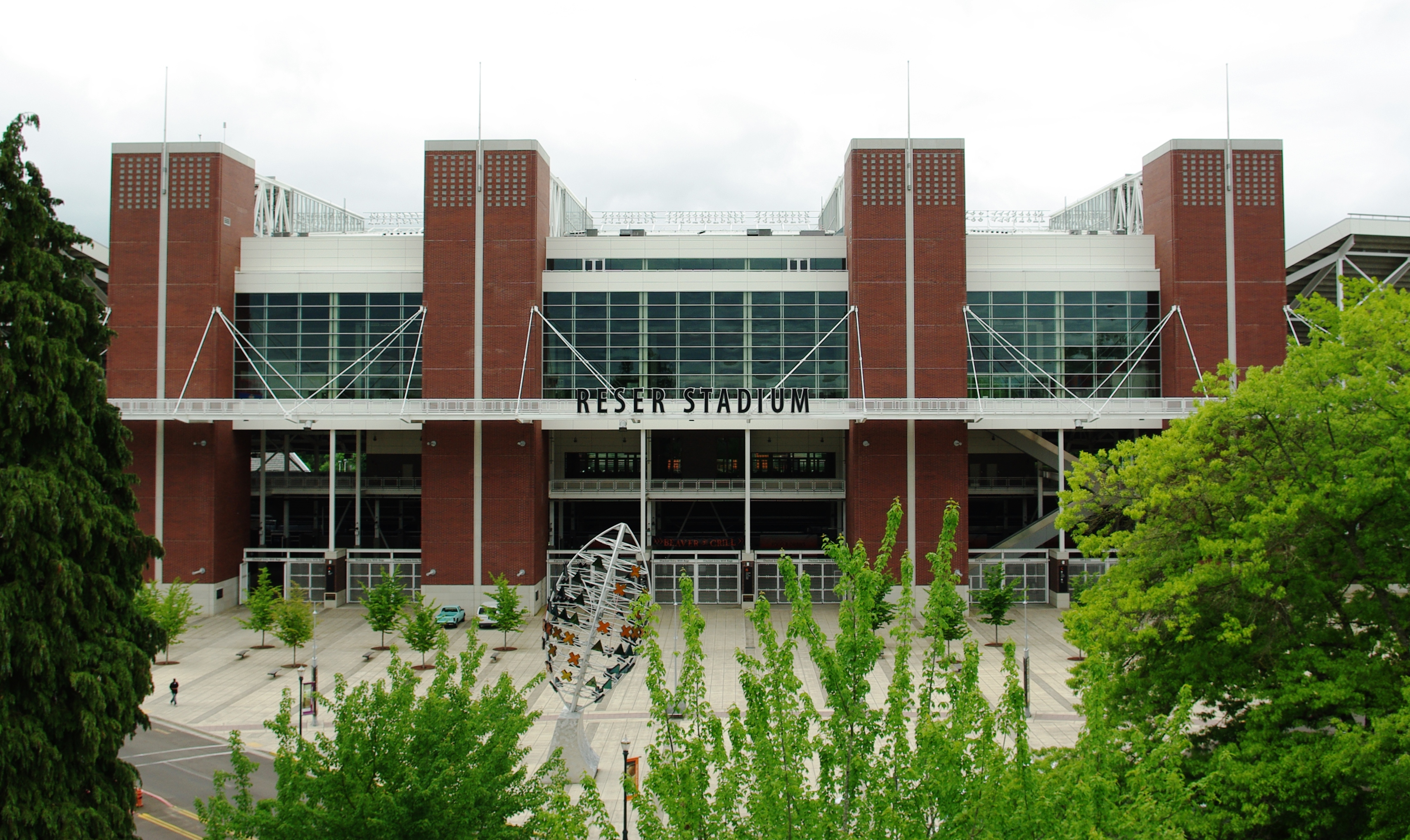
The renovated East Side entrance

Rank	Date	Opponent	Result	Attendance
1	November 24, 2012	#5 Oregon	L, 48–24	47,249
2	October 6, 2012	Washington State	W, 19–6	46,579
3	December 4, 2010	#1 Oregon	L, 37–20	46,469
4	November 29, 2008	#19 Oregon	L, 65–38	46,319
5	November 3, 2012	Arizona State	W, 36–26	45,979
6	November 15, 2008	California	W, 34–29	45,969
7	October 20, 2012	Utah	W, 21–7	45,796
8	November 29, 2014	#2 Oregon	L, 47–19	45,722
9	November 10, 2007	Washington	W, 29–23	45,629
10	October 30, 2010	California	W, 35–7	45,439

== Non-athletic uses ==
Apart from use from the Athletic Department, Reser Stadium is occasionally also used for various non-athletic events, particularly events such as commencement, held every June. This has allowed the stadium to hold notable speakers such as astronaut John Glenn, and former first lady Michelle Obama.

"Dam Jam" an annual end-of-the-year concert celebration put on for students and community members, by students, was held at Reser Stadium in 2018 and 2019, drawing up to approximately 14,000 to 18,000 people with headliners Alison Wonderland and Super Duper Kyle in 2018 and Akon and Jesse McCartney in 2019.

In 2005, following the opening game at the newly renovated Reser Stadium, country music duo Montgomery Gentry performed.

== Gallery ==
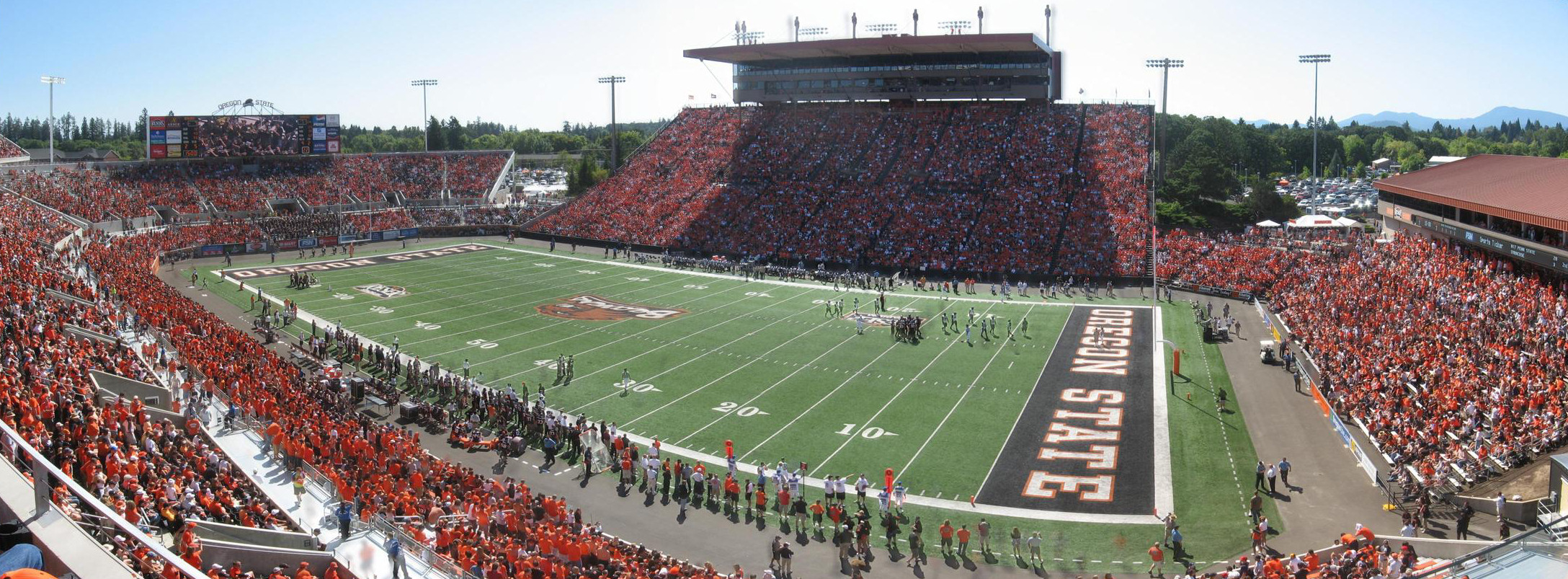
Reser Stadium in September 2008, looking south.

Panoramic view from the southeast end zone during the night game against Washington in November 2007

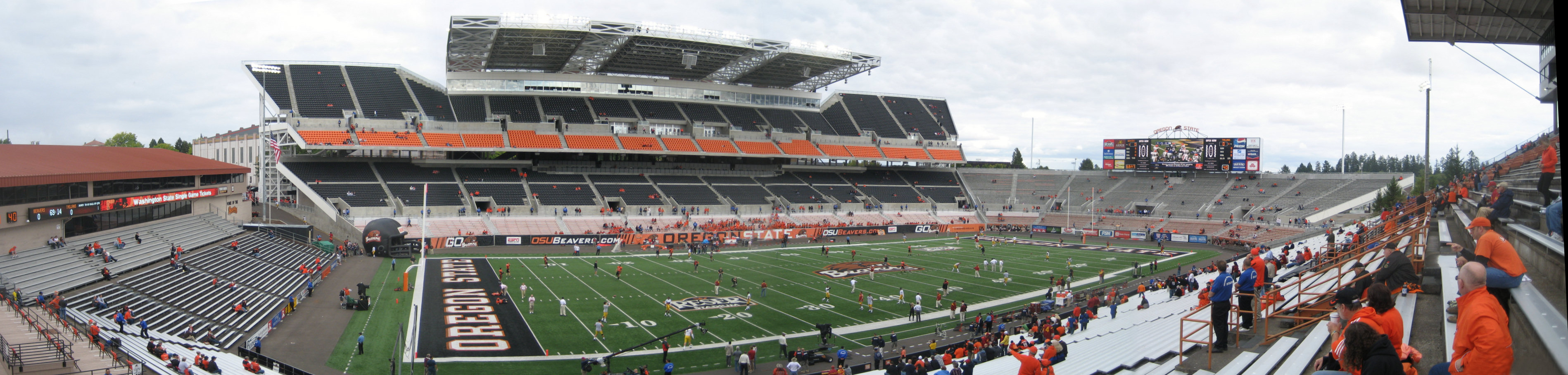
At the time newly renovated East Grandstand prior to the win over top-ranked USC in September 2008

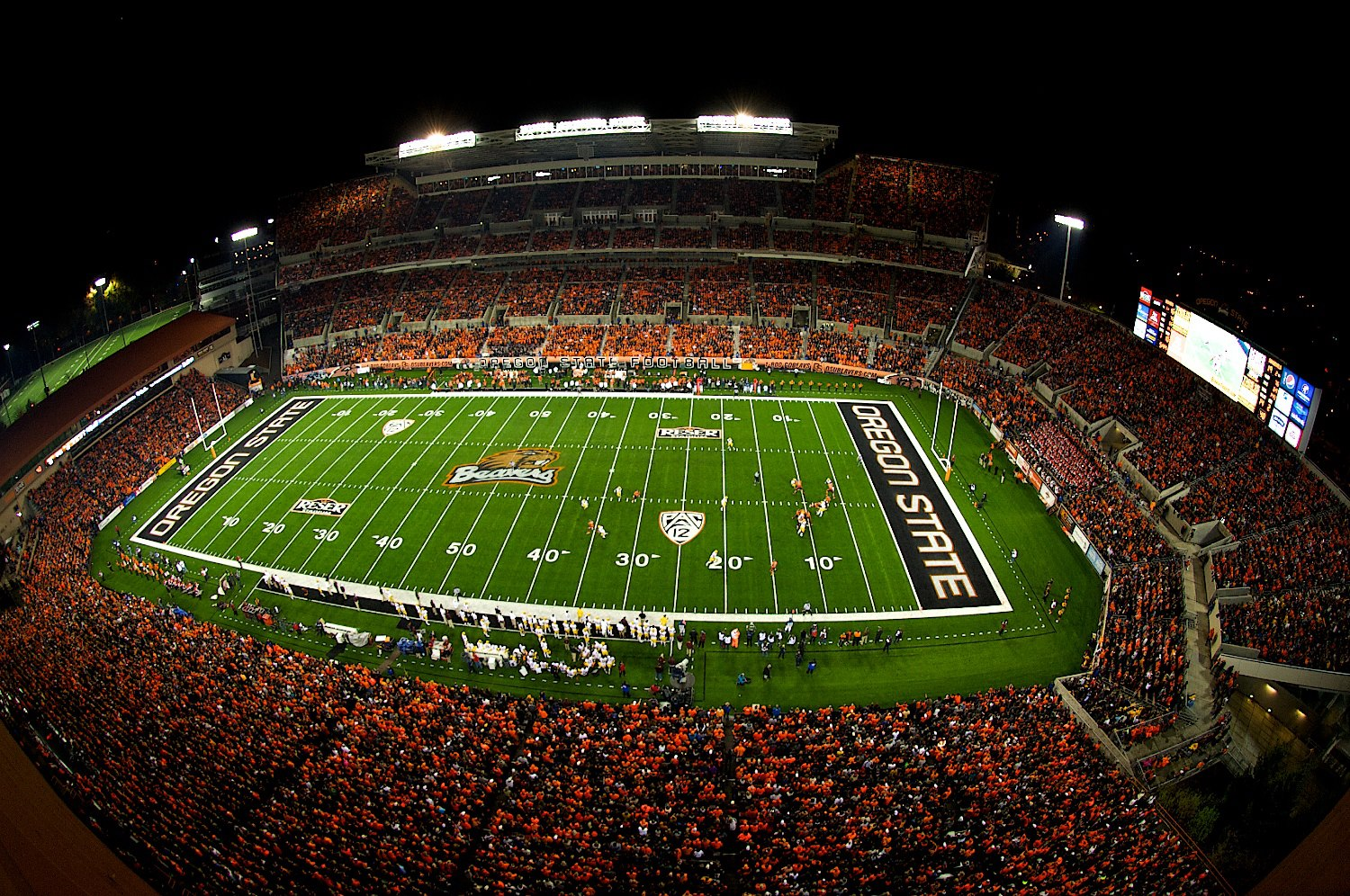
Hosting Arizona State in 2012

== See also ==
- List of NCAA Division I FBS football stadiums
