= 1953 Pacific Tigers football team =

American college football season

1953 Pacific Tigers football
- Conference: Independent
- Record: 4–4–2
- Head coach: Jack Myers (1st season)
- Home stadium: Pacific Memorial Stadium

1953 Western college football independents records
	Conf.			Overall
Team	W	L	T	W		L		T
Pacific (CA)		–		4	–	4	–	2
San Jose State		–		4	–	4	–	1
Hawaii		–		5	–	6	–	0
Nevada		–		2	–	3	–	0
La Verne		–		3	–	7	–	0
Cal Poly San Dimas		–		2	–	6	–	0

The 1953 Pacific Tigers football team represented the College of the Pacific (COP)—now known as the University of the Pacific (UOP)—as an independent during the 1953 college football season. In their first season under head coach Jack Myers, the Tigers compiled a record of 4–4–2 and outscored opponents 191 to 172. The team played home games at Pacific Memorial Stadium in Stockton, California.

== Schedule ==
Date	Opponent	Site	Result	Attendance	Source
September 19	at Stanford	Stanford Stadium; Stanford, CA	W 25–20	10,500	
September 26	Washington State	Pacific Memorial Stadium; Stockton, CA	L 20–26	23,203	
October 3	Tulsa	Pacific Memorial Stadium; Stockton, CA	L 13–22	20,121	
October 10	Hawaii	Pacific Memorial Stadium; Stockton, CA	W 26–8	10,659–11,000	
October 17	at Texas Tech	Jones Stadium; Lubbock, TX	L 7–34	12,000	
October 24	at Marquette	Marquette Stadium; Milwaukee, WI	T 20–20	19,500	
November 7	at San Jose State	Spartan Stadium; San Jose, CA (Victory Bell)	L 6–7	18,000	
November 14	at Idaho	Neale Stadium; Moscow, ID	W 33–0	3,000	
November 21	Fresno State	Pacific Memorial Stadium; Stockton, CA	T 21–21	8,906	
November 26	Utah State	Pacific Memorial Stadium; Stockton, CA	W 20–14	6,669	
