= 1953 Idaho Vandals football team =

American college football season

1953 Idaho Vandals football
- Conference: Pacific Coast Conference
- Record: 1–8 (0–3 PCC)
- Head coach: Raymond A. Curfman (3rd season)
- Home stadium: Neale Stadium

1953 Pacific Coast Conference football standings
	Conf.					Overall
Team	W		L		T	W		L		T
No. 5 UCLA $	6	–	1	–	0	8	–	2	–	0
No. 19 Stanford	5	–	1	–	1	6	–	3	–	1
USC	4	–	2	–	1	6	–	3	–	1
California	2	–	2	–	2	4	–	4	–	2
Washington State	3	–	4	–	0	4	–	6	–	0
Oregon State	3	–	5	–	0	3	–	6	–	0
Washington	2	–	4	–	1	3	–	6	–	1
Oregon	2	–	5	–	1	4	–	5	–	1
Idaho	0	–	3	–	0	1	–	8	–	0
$ – Conference champion; Rankings from AP Poll

The 1953 Idaho Vandals football team represented the University of Idaho in the 1953 college football season. The Vandals were led by third-year head coach Raymond A. Curfman and were members of the Pacific Coast Conference. Home games were played on campus at Neale Stadium in Moscow, with two games in Boise at old Bronco Stadium at Boise Junior College.

Led on the field by quarterback George Eidam, Idaho compiled a 1–8 record and were winless in their three PCC games.

The Vandals suffered another loss in the Battle of the Palouse with neighbor Washington State, falling, 30–13, at Neale Stadium on October 17. It ran the winless streak against the Cougars to 27 games, a record of 0–25–2 since taking three straight from 1923 to 1925; the Vandals broke the streak the next year in Pullman under new head coach Skip Stahley.

In the rivalry game with Montana at Missoula two weeks earlier, the Vandals ran their winning streak over the Grizzlies to three and retained the Little Brown Stein. Idaho scored twenty unanswered points to win 20–12, in their sole victory of the season.

Curfman made headlines in 1953 as his overmatched Vandals struggled in conference play in the PCC, and was under fire from alumni and boosters after a disappointing season. Following his resignation in December, he was hired as the business manager for the Spokane Indians minor league baseball team in January 1954.

== Schedule ==
Date	Time	Opponent	Site	Result	Attendance	Source
September 18	7:00 pm	at San Jose State*	Spartan Stadium; San Jose, CA	L 6–34	8,500–12,000	
September 26	7:00 pm	at Utah*	Ute Stadium; Salt Lake City, UT	L 0–21	17,361	
October 3		at Montana*	Dornblaser Field; Missoula, MT (Little Brown Stein)	W 20–12	5,294	
October 10	1:00 pm	vs. BYU*	old Bronco Stadium; Boise, ID	L 14–20	8,600	
October 17	2:00 pm	Washington State	Neale Stadium; Moscow, ID (Battle of the Palouse)	L 13–30	10,880	
October 24	2:00 pm	Oregon State^{†}	Neale Stadium; Moscow, ID	L 0–19	9,200	
November 7	1:30 pm	at Oregon	Hayward Field; Eugene, OR	L 6–25	10,000	
November 14	1:30 pm	Pacific (CA)*	Neale Stadium; Moscow, OD	L 0–33	3,000	
November 21	1:00 pm	vs. Utah State*	old Bronco Stadium; Boise, ID	L 7–19	5,000	
*Non-conference game; ^{†}Homecoming; All times are in Pacific time; Source:

== Coaching staff ==
- Chuck Gottfried, line
- Dixie B. White, backs
- Mack Flenniken, ends
- Clem Parberry, freshmen

== All-conference ==
No Vandals were on the All-PCC team; fullback Flip Kleffner was named to the second team and center Mel Bertrand was honorable mention.

== NFL draft ==
One senior from the 1953 Vandals was selected in the 1954 NFL draft:

Player	Position	Round	Pick	Franchise
Mel Bertrand	C	29th	349	Detroit Lions

One junior was selected in the 1955 NFL draft:

Player	Position	Round	Pick	Franchise
Burdette Hess	G	15th	178	San Francisco 49ers

- Often incorrectly listed as a UI Vandal, tackle Norm Hayes (1954 draft, #217) played at the College of Idaho in Caldwell.
