= 1953 Nevada Wolf Pack football team =

American college football season

1953 Nevada Wolf Pack football
- Conference: Independent
- Record: 2–3
- Head coach: Jake Lawlor (2nd season)
- Home stadium: Mackay Stadium

1953 Western college football independents records
| | Conf. | | | Overall |
| Team | W | L | T | W | | L | | T |
|---|---|---|---|---|---|---|---|---|
| Pacific (CA) | | – | | 4 | – | 4 | – | 2 |
| San Jose State | | – | | 4 | – | 4 | – | 1 |
| Hawaii | | – | | 5 | – | 6 | – | 0 |
| Nevada | | – | | 2 | – | 3 | – | 0 |
| La Verne | | – | | 3 | – | 7 | – | 0 |
| Cal Poly San Dimas | | – | | 2 | – | 6 | – | 0 |

The 1953 Nevada Wolf Pack football team represented the University of Nevada during the 1953 college football season. Nevada competed as an independent. The Wolf Pack were led by second-year head coach Jake Lawlor and played their home games at Mackay Stadium.

== Schedule ==
| Date | Opponent | Site | Result | Attendance | Source |
|---|---|---|---|---|---|
| October 10 | Chico State | Mackay Stadium; Reno, NV | W 27–7 | | |
| October 17 | at Fresno State | Ratcliffe Stadium; Fresno, CA | L 7–47 | 9,600 | |
| October 23 | at Cal Aggies | Aggie Field; Davis, CA | W 13–0 | | |
| November 7 | San Francisco State^{†} | Mackay Stadium; Reno, NV | L 27–28 | | |
| November 14 | Idaho State | Mackay Stadium; Reno, NV | L 13–34 | < 2,000 | |
^{†}Homecoming
