= 1953 Montana Grizzlies football team =

American college football season

1953 Montana Grizzlies football
- Conference: Skyline Conference
- Record: 3–5 (2–4 Skyline)
- Head coach: Ed Chinske (2nd season)
- Home stadium: Dornblaser Field

1953 Skyline Conference football standings
	Conf.					Overall
Team	W		L		T	W		L		T
Utah $	5	–	0	–	0	8	–	2	–	0
Utah State	5	–	2	–	0	8	–	3	–	0
Wyoming	4	–	2	–	1	5	–	4	–	1
New Mexico	3	–	2	–	1	5	–	3	–	1
Colorado A&M	3	–	4	–	0	4	–	5	–	0
Montana	2	–	4	–	0	3	–	5	–	0
Denver	1	–	5	–	1	3	–	5	–	2
BYU	1	–	5	–	1	2	–	7	–	1
$ – Conference champion

The 1953 Montana Grizzlies football team represented the University of Montana in the 1953 college football season as a member of the Skyline Conference. The Grizzlies were led by second-year head coach Ed Chinske, played their home games at Dornblaser Field and finished the season with a record of three wins and five losses (3–5, 2–4 Skyline).

== Schedule ==
Date	Opponent	Site	Result	Attendance	Source
September 19	at BYU	Cougar Stadium; Provo, UT	L 13–27	4,500	
September 26	Wyoming	Dornblaser Field; Missoula, MT	L 7–27	5,248	
October 3	Idaho*	Dornblaser Field; Missoula, MT (Little Brown Stein)	L 12–20	5,396	
October 9	at Denver	DU Stadium; Denver, CO	W 22–13	7,675	
October 17	Colorado A&M^{†}	Dornblaser Field; Missoula, MT	W 32–31	7,300	
October 24	New Mexico	Dornblaser Field; Missoula, MT	L 13–41	5,000	
October 31	at Utah State	Romney Stadium; Logan, UT	L 14–33	9,500	
November 7	at Montana State*	Gatton Field; Bozeman, MT (rivalry)	W 32–13	6,147	
*Non-conference game; ^{†}Homecoming
