= Hank Vasconcellos =

American football coach and college athletics administrator

Biographical details
- Born: April 30, 1911; Maui, Hawaii, U.S.
- Died: February 26, 1996 (aged 84); Honolulu, Hawaii, U.S.

Coaching career (HC unless noted)
- 1946–1947: Maui HS (HI)
- 1948–1951: Roosevelt HS (HI)
- 1952–1960: Hawaii

Administrative career (AD unless noted)
- 1952–1960: Hawaii

Head coaching record
- Overall: 43–46–3 (college)

Henry B. Vasconcellos (April 30, 1911 – February 26, 1996) was an American football coach and college athletics administrator. He served as the head football coach at the University of Hawaiʻi at Mānoa from 1952 to 1960.

Vasconcellos died on February 26, 1996, at the age of 84.

== Head coaching record ==
Year	Team	Overall	Conference	Standing	Bowl/playoffs
Hawaii Rainbows (Independent) (1952–1960)
1952	Hawaii	5–5–2			
1953	Hawaii	5–6			
1954	Hawaii	4–4			
1955	Hawaii	7–4			
1956	Hawaii	7–3			
1957	Hawaii	4–4–1			
1958	Hawaii	5–7			
1959	Hawaii	3–6			
1960	Hawaii	3–7			
Hawaii:		43–46–3			
Total:		43–46–3			
