= 1953 San Diego State Aztecs football team =

American college football season

1953 San Diego State Aztecs football
- Conference: California Collegiate Athletic Association
- Record: 5–3–1 (3–1–1 CCAA)
- Head coach: Bill Schutte (7th season)
- Home stadium: Aztec Bowl, Balboa Stadium

1953 California Collegiate Athletic Association football standings
	Conf.					Overall
Team	W		L		T	W		L		T
Cal Poly $	5	–	0	–	0	9	–	0	–	0
San Diego State	3	–	1	–	1	5	–	3	–	1
Fresno State	2	–	2	–	1	4	–	4	–	2
Pepperdine	2	–	3	–	0	3	–	6	–	0
Santa Barbara	1	–	4	–	0	2	–	6	–	1
Los Angeles State	1	–	4	–	0	2	–	7	–	0
$ – Conference champion

The 1953 San Diego State Aztecs football team represented San Diego State College (Note: San Diego State University was known as San Diego State College from 1935 to 1971.) during the 1953 college football season.

San Diego State competed in the California Collegiate Athletic Association (CCAA). The team was led by seventh-year head coach Bill Schutte, and played home games at both Aztec Bowl and Balboa Stadium. They finished the season with five wins, three losses and one tie (5–3–1, 3–1–1 CCAA). Overall, the team outscored its opponents 230–142 for the season.

== Schedule ==
Date	Opponent	Site	Result	Attendance	Source
September 26	Hawaii*	Aztec Bowl; San Diego, CA	W 40–7	8,500	
October 3	Cal Poly	Aztec Bowl; San Diego, CA	L 12–33	9,000	
October 10	at Pepperdine	El Camino Stadium; Torrance, CA	W 6–0	4,000	
October 17	at New Mexico*	Zimmerman Field; Albuquerque, NM	L 12–41	9,000	
October 23	at Los Angeles State	Snyder Field; Los Angeles, CA	W 40–13		
October 31	at Fresno State	Ratcliffe Stadium; Fresno, CA (rivalry)	T 27–27	6,212	
November 7	Occidental*^{†}	Aztec Bowl; San Diego, CA	W 14–7	9,000	
November 14	San Diego Marines (Note: The Marine Corps Recruit Depot (MCRD) in San Diego fielded a team that played against colleges and other military teams from 1922 to 1964.)*	Balboa Stadium; San Diego, CA	L 7–14	10,000	
November 21	Santa Barbara	Aztec Bowl; San Diego, CA	W 72–0	7,000	
*Non-conference game; ^{†}Homecoming

== Team players in the NFL ==
The following San Diego State players were selected in the 1954 NFL draft.

Player	Position	Round	Overall	NFL Team
Norm Nygaard	Back	4	46	Los Angeles Rams
