= 1953 Utah State Aggies football team =

American college football season

1953 Utah State Aggies football
- Conference: Skyline Conference
- Record: 8–3 (5–2 Skyline)
- Head coach: John Roning (3rd season)
- Home stadium: Romney Stadium

1953 Skyline Conference football standings
	Conf.					Overall
Team	W		L		T	W		L		T
Utah $	5	–	0	–	0	8	–	2	–	0
Utah State	5	–	2	–	0	8	–	3	–	0
Wyoming	4	–	2	–	1	5	–	4	–	1
New Mexico	3	–	2	–	1	5	–	3	–	1
Colorado A&M	3	–	4	–	0	4	–	5	–	0
Montana	2	–	4	–	0	3	–	5	–	0
Denver	1	–	5	–	1	3	–	5	–	2
BYU	1	–	5	–	1	2	–	7	–	1
$ – Conference champion

The 1953 Utah State Aggies football team was an American football team that represented Utah State University in the Skyline Conference during the 1953 college football season. In their third season under head coach John Roning, the Aggies compiled an 8–3 record (5–2 against Skyline opponents), placed second behind rival Utah in the Skyline Conference, and outscored all opponents by a total of 207 to 139.

Offensive lineman Dave Kragthorpe receive first-team all-conference honors. (Kragthorpe later served as head coach at Oregon State from 1985 to 1990.) Earl Lindley led the NCAA with 81 points scored. He remains the only Utah State player in school history to accomplish that feat. (Lindley later played on three Grey Cup championship teams in the Canadian Football League.)

== Schedule ==
Date	Opponent	Site	Result	Attendance	Source
September 19	Wichita*	Romney Stadium; Logan, UT	W 14–7	5,000	
September 26	New Mexico	Romney Stadium; Logan, UT	W 6–0	9,000	
October 3	at Wyoming	War Memorial Stadium; Laramie, WY (rivalry)	L 13–20	8,764	
October 10	Utah	Romney Stadium; Logan, UT (rivalry)	L 13–33	9,631	
October 16	at BYU	Cougar Stadium; Provo, UT (rivalry)	W 14–7	10,000	
October 24	at Colorado A&M	Colorado Field; Fort Collins, CO	W 14–13	6,264	
October 31	Montana	Romney Stadium; Logan, UT	W 33–14	9,500	
November 7	Fresno State*	Romney Stadium; Logan, UT	W 46–6		
November 14	at Denver	DU Stadium; Denver, CO	W 21–12	12,858	
November 21	vs. Idaho*	Bronco Stadium (I); Boise, ID	W 19–7	5,000	
November 26	at Pacific (CA)*	Grape Bowl; Lodi, CA	L 14–20	6,669	
*Non-conference game
