= 1953 Washington State Cougars football team =

American college football season

1953 Washington State Cougars football
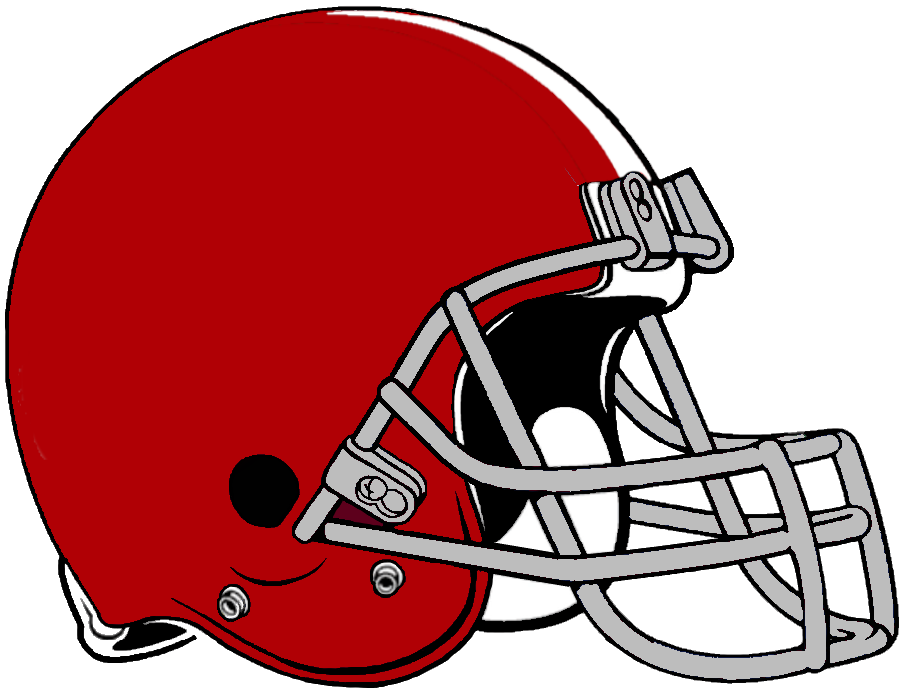
- Conference: Pacific Coast Conference
- Record: 4–6 (3–4 PCC)
- Head coach: Al Kircher (2nd season)
- Captain: Bob Burkhart
- Home stadium: Rogers Field, Memorial Stadium

1953 Pacific Coast Conference football standings
	Conf.					Overall
Team	W		L		T	W		L		T
No. 5 UCLA $	6	–	1	–	0	8	–	2	–	0
No. 19 Stanford	5	–	1	–	1	6	–	3	–	1
USC	4	–	2	–	1	6	–	3	–	1
California	2	–	2	–	2	4	–	4	–	2
Washington State	3	–	4	–	0	4	–	6	–	0
Oregon State	3	–	5	–	0	3	–	6	–	0
Washington	2	–	4	–	1	3	–	6	–	1
Oregon	2	–	5	–	1	4	–	5	–	1
Idaho	0	–	3	–	0	1	–	8	–	0
$ – Conference champion; Rankings from AP Poll

The 1953 Washington State Cougars football team was an American football team that represented Washington State College during the 1953 college football season. Led by second-year head coach Al Kircher, the team was 4–6 overall and 3–4 in the Pacific Coast Conference.

Two home games were played on campus in Pullman at Rogers Field, and one in Spokane in November. A road game was played nearby, against Palouse neighbor Idaho in Moscow, extending WSC's unbeaten streak over the Vandals to 27 games. The Cougars defeated rival Washington by five points in Seattle.

== Schedule ==
Date	Opponent	Site	Result	Attendance	Source
September 19	No. 8 USC	Rogers Field; Pullman, WA	L 13–29	20,000	
September 26	at Pacific (CA)*	Pacific Memorial Stadium; Stockton, CA	W 26–20	23,203	
October 3	at Iowa*	Iowa Stadium; Iowa City, IA	L 12–54	31,500	
October 10	Oregon^{†}	Rogers Field; Pullman, WA	W 7–0	16,000	
October 17	at Idaho	Neale Stadium; Moscow, ID (Battle of the Palouse)	W 30–13	19,000	
October 24	at No. 12 UCLA	Los Angeles Memorial Coliseum; Los Angeles, CA	L 7–44	27,608	
October 31	at No. 17 Stanford	Stanford Stadium; Stanford, CA	L 19–48	18,500	
November 7	TCU*	Memorial Stadium; Spokane, WA	L 7–21	17,500	
November 14	at Oregon State	Parker Stadium; Corvallis, OR	L 0–7	13,500	
November 21	at Washington	Husky Stadium; Seattle, WA (rivalry)	W 25–20	40,000	
*Non-conference game; ^{†}Homecoming; Rankings from AP Poll released prior to the game; Source:

== NFL draft ==
Four Cougars were selected in the 1954 NFL draft, which was 30 rounds and 360 selections.

Player	Position	Round	Overall	Franchise
Howard McCants	End	4	49	Detroit Lions
Wayne Berry	Back	7	76	New York Giants
Milt Schwenk	Tackle	11	133	Detroit Lions
Terry Campbell	Back	30	351	Green Bay Packers
