= 1953 San Francisco State Gators football team =

American college football season

1953 San Francisco State Gators football
- Conference: Far Western Conference
- Record: 5–3 (0–1 FWC)
- Head coach: Joe Verducci (4th season)
- Home stadium: Cox Stadium

1953 Far Western Conference football standings
	Conf.					Overall
Team	W		L		T	W		L		T
Chico State $	4	–	0	–	1	6	–	3	–	1
Humboldt State	2	–	1	–	0	6	–	2	–	0
Cal Aggies	1	–	2	–	1	1	–	6	–	1
San Francisco State	0	–	1	–	0	5	–	3	–	0
Southern Oregon	0	–	3	–	0	3	–	4	–	0
$ – Conference champion; Conference records includes both Chico State vs. Cal Aggies games

The 1953 San Francisco State Gators football team represented San Francisco State College—now known as San Francisco State University—as a member of the Far Western Conference (FWC) during the 1953 college football season. Led by fourth-year head coach Joe Verducci, San Francisco State compiled an overall record of 5–3 with a mark of 0–1 in conference play. For the season the team outscored its opponents 180 to 159. The Gators played home games at Cox Stadium in San Francisco.

== Schedule ==
Date	Opponent	Site	Result	Attendance	Source
October 2	Caltech*	Cox Stadium; San Francisco, CA	W 52–0		
October 9	Moffett Field Air Corps (Note: Naval Air Station Moffett Field was a Naval Air Station from 1933 to 1994.)*	Cox Stadium; San Francisco, CA	W 20–13		
October 16	Cal Poly*	Cox Stadium; San Francisco, CA	L 14–46		
October 24	at Chico State	Chico High School Stadium; Chico, CA	L 0–13		
October 30	at Pepperdine*	El Camino Stadium; Torrance, CA	W 13–6		
November 7	at Nevada*	Mackay Stadium (Note: This stadium is the predecessor to the current Mackay Stadium, which was opened for the 1966 season.); Reno, NV	W 28–27		
November 11	at Fresno State*	Ratcliffe Stadium; Fresno, CA	L 27–41	6,250	
November 14	Santa Barbara	Cox Stadium; San Francisco, CA	W 26–13		
*Non-conference game

== Team players in the NFL ==
No San Francisco State players were selected in the 1954 NFL draft.

The following finished their college career in 1953, were not drafted, but played in the NFL.

Player	Position	First NFL team
Maury Duncan	Quarterback	1954 San Francisco 49ers
