= 1953 Los Angeles State Diablos football team =

American college football season

1953 Los Angeles State Diablos football
- Conference: California Collegiate Athletic Association
- Record: 2–7 (1–4 CCAA)
- Head coach: Leonard Adams (3rd season)
- Home stadium: Snyder Stadium

1953 California Collegiate Athletic Association football standings
| | Conf. | | | | | Overall |
| Team | W | | L | | T | W | | L | | T |
|---|---|---|---|---|---|---|---|---|---|---|
| Cal Poly $ | 5 | – | 0 | – | 0 | 9 | – | 0 | – | 0 |
| San Diego State | 3 | – | 1 | – | 1 | 5 | – | 3 | – | 1 |
| Fresno State | 2 | – | 2 | – | 1 | 4 | – | 4 | – | 2 |
| Pepperdine | 2 | – | 3 | – | 0 | 3 | – | 6 | – | 0 |
| Santa Barbara | 1 | – | 4 | – | 0 | 2 | – | 6 | – | 1 |
| Los Angeles State | 1 | – | 4 | – | 0 | 2 | – | 7 | – | 0 |
$ – Conference champion

The 1953 Los Angeles State Diablos football team represented Los Angeles State College—now known as California State University, Los Angeles—as a member of the California Collegiate Athletic Association (CCAA) during the 1953 college football season. Led by third-year head coach Leonard Adams, Los Angeles State compiled an overall record of 2–7 with a mark of 1–4 in conference play, tying for fifth place in the CCAA. The Diablos played home games at Snyder Stadium in Los Angeles.

== Schedule ==
| Date | Time | Opponent | Site | Result | Attendance | Source |
|---|---|---|---|---|---|---|
| September 25 | 8:00 pm | at Occidental* | D. W. Patterson Field; Los Angeles, CA | L 6–14 | | |
| October 2 | 8:15 pm | Redlands* | Snyder Field; Los Angeles, CA | L 13–34 | | |
| October 9 | 8:15 pm | Fresno State | Snyder Field; Los Angeles, CA | W 14–12 | 2,000 | |
| October 17 | | at Santa Barbara | La Playa Stadium; Santa Barbara, CA | L 12–21 | | |
| October 23 | 8:15 pm | San Diego State | Snyder Field; Los Angeles, CA | L 13–40 | | |
| October 30 | | at Terminal Island Navy (Note: Naval Air Station Terminal Island was one of several names for the Naval air station and repair facility located on Terminal Island in Los Angeles County, California from 1938 to 1997)* | Navy Field; Terminal Island, CA | W 33–20 | | |
| November 7 | 8:00 pm | at Cal Poly | Mustang Stadium; San Luis Obispo, CA | L 0–51 | | |
| November 14 | 2:00 pm | Whittier* | Snyder Field; Los Angeles, CA | L 0–7 | | |
| November 20 | 8:00 pm | Pepperdine | Snyder Field; Los Angeles, CA ("Old Shoe" rivalry) | L 7–13 | | |
*Non-conference game
