= 1953 USC Trojans football team =

American college football season

1953 USC Trojans football
- Conference: Pacific Coast Conference
- Record: 6–3–1 (4–2–1 PCC)
- Head coach: Jess Hill (3rd season)
- Captains: George Bozanic; Tom Nickoloff
- Home stadium: Los Angeles Memorial Coliseum

1953 Pacific Coast Conference football standings
| | Conf. | | | | | Overall |
| Team | W | | L | | T | W | | L | | T |
|---|---|---|---|---|---|---|---|---|---|---|
| No. 5 UCLA $ | 6 | – | 1 | – | 0 | 8 | – | 2 | – | 0 |
| No. 19 Stanford | 5 | – | 1 | – | 1 | 6 | – | 3 | – | 1 |
| USC | 4 | – | 2 | – | 1 | 6 | – | 3 | – | 1 |
| California | 2 | – | 2 | – | 2 | 4 | – | 4 | – | 2 |
| Washington State | 3 | – | 4 | – | 0 | 4 | – | 6 | – | 0 |
| Oregon State | 3 | – | 5 | – | 0 | 3 | – | 6 | – | 0 |
| Washington | 2 | – | 4 | – | 1 | 3 | – | 6 | – | 1 |
| Oregon | 2 | – | 5 | – | 1 | 4 | – | 5 | – | 1 |
| Idaho | 0 | – | 3 | – | 0 | 1 | – | 8 | – | 0 |
$ – Conference champion; Rankings from AP Poll

The 1953 USC Trojans football team represented the University of Southern California (USC) in the 1953 college football season. In their third year under head coach Jess Hill, the Trojans compiled a 6–3–1 record (4–2–1 against conference opponents), finished in third place in the Pacific Coast Conference, and outscored their opponents by a combined total of 199 to 161. The team's home attendance of 413,617 in six games was the highest in the country during the 1953 season. The total attendance of 561,389 in 10 games was the second highest in the nation.

George Bozanic led the team in passing yardage with 15 of 34 passes completed for 278 yards, four touchdowns and one interception. Aramis Dandoy led the team in rushing with 113 carries for 578 yards and six touchdowns. Tom Nickoloff was the leading receiver with 16 catches for 214 yards and two touchdowns.

Three Trojans received honors from the Associated Press (AP), the United Press (UP), or Tide Water (TW) on the 1953 All-Pacific Coast Conference football team: back Aramis Dandoy (AP-1); tackle Mario Da Re (TW); and guard George Timberlake (AP-1; UP-1; TW).

== Schedule ==
| Date | Opponent | Rank | Site | Result | Attendance | Source |
|---|---|---|---|---|---|---|
| September 19 | at Washington State | No. 8 | Rogers Field; Pullman, WA | W 29–13 | 20,000 | |
| September 26 | Minnesota* | No. 8 | Los Angeles Memorial Coliseum; Los Angeles, CA | W 17–7 | 66,698 | |
| October 2 | Indiana* | No. 7 | Los Angeles Memorial Coliseum; Los Angeles, CA | W 27–14 | 49,578 | |
| October 10 | at Washington | No. 7 | Husky Stadium; Seattle, WA | T 13–13 | 32,000 | |
| October 17 | Oregon State | No. 13 | Los Angeles Memorial Coliseum; Los Angeles, CA | W 37–0 | 34,163 | |
| October 24 | at California | No. 11 | California Memorial Stadium; Berkeley, CA | W 32–20 | 78,000 | |
| October 31 | at Oregon | No. 7 | Multnomah Stadium; Portland, OR | L 7–13 | 17,772 | |
| November 7 | No. 11 Stanford^{†} | No. 17 | Los Angeles Memorial Coliseum; Los Angeles, CA (rivalry) | W 23–20 | 79,015 | |
| November 21 | No. 5 UCLA | No. 9 | Los Angeles Memorial Coliseum; Los Angeles, CA (Victory Bell) | L 0–13 | 85,366 | |
| November 28 | No. 2 Notre Dame* | No. 20 | Los Angeles Memorial Coliseum; Los Angeles, CA (rivalry) | L 14–48 | 97,952 | |
*Non-conference game; ^{†}Homecoming; Rankings from AP Poll released prior to the game; Source:

== Players ==
The following players were members of the 1953 USC football team.

- Mickey Artenian, left guard, #63, Los Angeles, 6'0", 190 pounds
- Al Baldock, left end, #83, Santa Monica, California, 6'3", 200 pounds
- Al Barry, 6'2", 221 pounds, right tackle (offense and defense), #79, 200 pounds
- George Bozanic, blocking back, #38, Lander, Wyoming, 6'2", 205 pounds (co-captain)
- Bob Buckley, wingback, #33, Brooklyn, New York, 5'9-1/2", 180 pounds
- Leon Clarke, right end, #81, Los Angeles, Commerce, California, 6'4", 210 pounds
- Jim Contratto, quarterback, #12, Compton, California, 5'9", 180 pounds
- Lindon Crow, wingback, #36, Corcoran, California, 6'1", 190 pounds ("a stand out on defense")
- Aramis Dandoy, tailback, #27, Torrance, California, 5'11", 180 pounds
- Mario Da Re, left tackle, #74, Crockett, California, 6'2-1/2", 215 pounds
- Jim "Triple" Decker, tailback, #21, San Pedro, California, 5'10", 190 pounds
- Landon Exley, quarterback, #35, Santa Monica, California, 6'0", 180 pounds
- Orlando Ferrante, right guard, #61, Los Angeles, 5'11", 192 pounds
- Ed Fouch, tackle, #49, Santa Ana, California, 6'3", 225 pounds (benched by a knee injury)
- George Galli, left guard, #60, Pittsburgh, Pennsylvania, 5'10-1/2", 195 pounds
- Harold Han, fullback, #46, Honolulu, Hawaii, 5'9", 185 pounds
- Addison Hawthorne, fullback, #23, Los Angeles, 5'10", 195 pounds
- Des Koch, tailback, #43, Shelton, Washington, 6'1", 208 pounds (led the nation in punts)
- John Miller, right tackle, #79, Compton, California, 6'1-1/2", 191 pounds
- Ron Miller, left end, #88, Los Angeles, 6'4", 205 pounds
- Tom Nickoloff, right end, #80, Los Angeles, 6'3-1/2", 220 pounds (co-captain, "a standout both on offense and defense" for three years)
- Frank Pavich, left tackle, #75, San Francisco, California, 6'0", 213 pounds
- Dick Petty, center, #54, Auburn, California, 6'0", 196 pounds
- Ed Pucci, left guard, #64, Canton, Ohio, 6'0", 215 pounds (invited to play in East-West game)
- Bill Riddle, blocking back, #52, El Centro, California, 6'0", 200 pounds (started season as 3rd-string quarterback, then moved to fullback)
- Vern Sampson, center, #53, Sacramento, California, 6'0", 205 pounds
- Leon Sellers, fullback, #44, Ontario, California, 6'0", 190 pounds
- Ken Thompson, right tackle, #78, Phoenix, Arizona, 6'2", 216 pounds
- George Timberlake, right guard, #56, Long Beach, California, 6'0", 210 pounds
- Sam Tsagalakis, aka "Sad Sam" and "The Toe", placekicker, #31, Los Angeles, 5'7-1/2", 165 pounds (kicked game-winning field goal against Stanford)
- Tom Weber, left tackle, #73, Canton, Ohio

== Coaches and other staff ==
- Head coach: Jess Hill
- Assistant coaches: Mel Hein (line coach), George Ceithaml (backfield coach), Don Clark (line coach), Bill Fisk (end coach), Nick Pappas (backfield coach), Jess Mortensen (freshman coach)
- Senior manager: Bob Laughlin
