= 1953 Washington Huskies football team =

American college football season

1953 Washington Huskies football
- Conference: Pacific Coast Conference
- Record: 3–6–1 (2–4–1 PCC)
- Head coach: John Cherberg (1st season)
- Captain: Vern Lindskog
- Home stadium: University of Washington Stadium

1953 Pacific Coast Conference football standings
	Conf.					Overall
Team	W		L		T	W		L		T
No. 5 UCLA $	6	–	1	–	0	8	–	2	–	0
No. 19 Stanford	5	–	1	–	1	6	–	3	–	1
USC	4	–	2	–	1	6	–	3	–	1
California	2	–	2	–	2	4	–	4	–	2
Washington State	3	–	4	–	0	4	–	6	–	0
Oregon State	3	–	5	–	0	3	–	6	–	0
Washington	2	–	4	–	1	3	–	6	–	1
Oregon	2	–	5	–	1	4	–	5	–	1
Idaho	0	–	3	–	0	1	–	8	–	0
$ – Conference champion; Rankings from AP Poll

The 1953 Washington Huskies football team was an American football team that represented the University of Washington during the 1953 college football season. In its first season under head coach John Cherberg, the team compiled a 3–6–1 record, finished in seventh place in the Pacific Coast Conference, and outscored its opponents by a combined total of 217 to 154. Vern Lindskog was the team captain.

== Schedule ==
Date	Opponent	Site	Result	Attendance	Source
September 19	Colorado*	University of Washington Stadium; Seattle, WA	L 20–21	31,000	
September 26	at Michigan*	Michigan Stadium; Ann Arbor, MI	L 0–50	51,233	
October 3	Oregon State	University of Washington Stadium; Seattle, WA	W 28–0	28,000	
October 10	No. 7 USC	University of Washington Stadium; Seattle, WA	T 13–13	32,000	
October 17	at Oregon	Multnomah Stadium; Portland, OR (rivalry)	W 14–6	21,677	
October 24	No. 20 Stanford	University of Washington Stadium; Seattle, WA	L 7–13	39,000	
October 31	Utah*	University of Washington Stadium; Seattle, WA	W 21–14	21,000–23,389	
November 7	at California	California Memorial Stadium; Berkeley, CA	L 25–53	36,000	
November 14	at No. 7 UCLA	Los Angeles Memorial Coliseum; Los Angeles, CA	L 6–22	13,302	
November 21	Washington State^{†}	University of Washington Stadium; Seattle, WA (rivalry)	L 20–25	40,000	
*Non-conference game; ^{†}Homecoming; Rankings from AP Poll released prior to the game; Source:

== NFL draft selections ==
Four University of Washington Huskies were selected in the 1954 NFL draft, which lasted 30 rounds with 360 selections.

= Husky Hall of Fame

Player	Position	Round	Pick	NFL club
George Black	End	8th	94	Los Angeles Rams
Dean Chambers	Tackle	9th	98	Chicago Cardinals
Duane Wardlow	Tackle	11th	130	Los Angeles Rams
Bill Albrecht	End	29th	338	Chicago Cardinals

== Game summaries ==
=== Washington State ===
The game-winning touchdown (Chuck Beckel, 4 yards) came after a Washington punt was blocked by Tom Gunnari deep in Washington territory early in the 4th quarter.

Washington State Cougars at Washington Huskies

Quarter	1	2	3	4	Total
Washington State	13	0	6	6	25
Washington	0	13	7	0	20

at University of Washington Stadium • Seattle, Washington

- Date: November 21
- Game weather: Rain
- Game attendance: 40,000
