= 1953 San Jose State Spartans football team =

American college football season

1953 San Jose State Spartans football
- Conference: Independent
- Record: 4–4–1
- Head coach: Bob Bronzan (4th season)
- Home stadium: Spartan Stadium

1953 Western college football independents records
	Conf.			Overall
Team	W	L	T	W		L		T
Pacific (CA)		–		4	–	4	–	2
San Jose State		–		4	–	4	–	1
Hawaii		–		5	–	6	–	0
Nevada		–		2	–	3	–	0
La Verne		–		3	–	7	–	0
Cal Poly San Dimas		–		2	–	6	–	0

The 1953 San Jose State Spartans football team represented San Jose State College—now known as San Jose State University—as an independent during the 1953 college football season. Led by fourth-year head coach Bob Bronzan, the Spartans compiled a record of 4–4–1 and were outscored by opponents 220 to 156. The team played home games at Spartan Stadium in San Jose, California.

== Schedule ==
Date	Time	Opponent	Site	Result	Attendance	Source
September 18	7:00 p.m.	Idaho	Spartan Stadium; San Jose, CA	W 34–6	9,000	
September 25		at BYU	Cougar Stadium (Note: This stadium is the predecessor to the current Cougar Stadium on the BYU campus, which was opened for the 1964 season); Provo, UT	W 28–25	6,000	
October 3		at Fresno State	Ratcliffe Stadium; Fresno, CA (rivalry)	W 27–21	5,574	
October 10		Arizona State	Spartan Stadium; San Jose, CA	L 20–35	12,500	
October 17		at No. 16 California	California Memorial Stadium; Berkeley, CA	L 14–34	39,000	
October 24		at Oregon	Hayward Field; Eugene, OR	L 13–26	11,500	
October 31		North Texas State	Spartan Stadium; San Jose, CA	T 13–13	7,500	
November 7		Pacific (CA)	Spartan Stadium; San Jose, CA (Victory Bell)	W 7–6	18,000	
November 14		at No. 16 Stanford	Stanford Stadium; Stanford, CA (rivalry)	L 0–54	12,000	
Rankings from AP Poll released prior to the game; All times are in Pacific time

== Team players in the NFL ==
The following San Jose State players were selected in the 1954 NFL draft.

Player	Position	Round	Overall	NFL team
Charlie Allen	Tackle	5	57	Los Angeles Rams
