= 1953 Utah Utes football team =

American college football season

1953 Utah Utes football

Skyline champion
- Conference: Skyline Conference
- Record: 8–2 (5–0 Skyline)
- Head coach: Jack Curtice (4th season)
- Home stadium: Ute Stadium

1953 Skyline Conference football standings
	Conf.					Overall
Team	W		L		T	W		L		T
Utah $	5	–	0	–	0	8	–	2	–	0
Utah State	5	–	2	–	0	8	–	3	–	0
Wyoming	4	–	2	–	1	5	–	4	–	1
New Mexico	3	–	2	–	1	5	–	3	–	1
Colorado A&M	3	–	4	–	0	4	–	5	–	0
Montana	2	–	4	–	0	3	–	5	–	0
Denver	1	–	5	–	1	3	–	5	–	2
BYU	1	–	5	–	1	2	–	7	–	1
$ – Conference champion

The 1953 Utah Utes football team, or also commonly known as the Utah Redskins, was an American football team that represented the University of Utah as a member of the Skyline Conference during the 1953 college football season. In their fourth season under head coach Jack Curtice, the Utes compiled an overall record of 8–2 with a mark of 5–0 against conference opponents, winning Skyline title for the third consecutive year.

Utah played its first nationally televised game in the final game of the season, on November 26. NBC Sports televised 12 games during the season, making the BYU–Utah rivalry game played on Thanksgiving Day among the first nationally broadcast college football games. Utah was 7–2, had clinched their third consecutive Skyline Conference title the previous week, and BYU had won only twice. Utah was heavily favored to win the game, by up to 24 points. BYU played tough, though, and Utah prevailed by one point, 33–32.

== Schedule ==
Date	Opponent	Site	TV	Result	Attendance	Source
September 19	at Arizona*	Arizona Stadium; Tucson, AZ		W 28–7	22,500	
September 26	Idaho*	Ute Stadium; Salt Lake City, UT		W 21–0	17,361	
October 3	Hawaii*	Ute Stadium; Salt Lake City, UT		W 47–24	13,225	
October 10	at Utah State	Romney Stadium; Logan, UT (rivalry)		W 33–13	9,631	
October 17	Denver	Ute Stadium; Salt Lake City, UT		W 40–6	9,162	
October 24	Wyoming	Ute Stadium; Salt Lake City, UT		W 13–12	12,429	
October 31	at Washington*	Husky Stadium; Seattle, WA		L 14–21	21,000–23,389	
November 7	at Colorado*	Folsom Field; Boulder, CO (rivalry)		L 0–21	18,500	
November 14	Colorado A&M^{†}	Ute Stadium; Salt Lake City, UT		W 35–14	13,089	
November 26	BYU	Ute Stadium; Salt Lake City, UT (rivalry)	NBC	W 33–32	20,189	
*Non-conference game; ^{†}Homecoming

== NFL draft ==
Four Utah players were selected in the 1954 NFL draft.

Player	Position	Round	Pick	NFL team
Jack Cross	Back	7	85	Detroit Lions
Charlie Grant	Center	16	189	Philadelphia Eagles
Don Rydalch	Back	19	223	Pittsburgh Steelers
Jim Durrant	Guard	20	241	Detroit Lions
