= Gordon McEachron =

American football coach

Biographical details
- Born: January 19, 1919; Los Angeles, California, U.S.
- Died: April 23, 1993 (aged 74); Apple Valley, California, U.S.

Coaching career (HC unless noted)
- 1952: Pepperdine (assistant)
- 1953–1954: Pepperdine
- 1955–1958: Nevada

Head coaching record
- Overall: 15–31–1

Gordon Townsand McEachron (January 19, 1919 – April 23, 1993) was an American college football coach and United States Army Air Forces officer. He served as the head football coach at Pepperdine University from 1953 to 1954 and the University of Nevada 1955 to 1958, compiling a career coaching record of 15–31–1.

== Biography ==
A native of Los Angeles, Mac was born on January 19, 1919, and served in the United States Army Air Forces. The Los Angeles Times described him as "tall, blondish, personable, and a convincing speaker." In 1945, at the rank of captain, he was held as a prisoner of war in Nazi Germany. He attended Pepperdine College in Malibu, California and graduated in 1948.

McEachron then joined the athletic staff at his alma mater as a trainer. In 1952, he was an assistant coach to Robert "Duck" Dowell, the Pepperdine basketball coach who had temporarily also taken over responsibilities for the football team. McEachron succeeded Dowell the following season. He served as the head football coach from 1953 to 1954 and compiled a 9–8 record.

He accepted the same position at Nevada in 1955 for a $7,300 salary. The university had demoted its football program from major college football status in 1951 due to a budget deficit, and had struggled to remain competitive. In 1956, the Nevada alumni association raised $4,500 for a part-time work program for football players. The initiative, however, failed, and in October 1957, McEachron supported the players in their petition for a renewal of free room and board for the team during the season. They offered to work part-time campus jobs in exchange. McEachron said, "We're not trying to go big-time again, just to compete on an equal basis."

McEachron offered his resignation on October 30, 1957, which reportedly "came as a complete surprise" to the athletic director. Art Broten said, "But I am totally indifferent—Mac took the job with the understanding we gave no aid to athletes." McEachron remained on for one more year, and resigned for good in 1959. He had compiled a 6–23–1 record at Nevada.

== Head coaching record ==
Year	Team	Overall	Conference	Standing	Bowl/playoffs
Pepperdine Waves (California Collegiate Athletic Association) (1953–1954)
1953	Pepperdine	3–6	2–3	4th	
1954	Pepperdine	6–2	0–0	NA	
Pepperdine:		9–8	2–3		
Nevada Wolf Pack (Far Western Conference) (1955–1958)
1955	Nevada	2–5	1–4	5th	
1956	Nevada	0–7–1	0–4–1	6th	
1957	Nevada	1–8	1–4	5th	
1958	Nevada	3–3	2–3	T–4th	
Nevada:		6–23–1	4–15–1		
Total:		15–31–1			
