= 1953 Chico State Wildcats football team =

American college football season

1953 Chico State Wildcats football

FWC champion
- Conference: Far Western Conference
- Record: 6–3–1 (4–0–1 FWC)
- Head coach: Ernie Busch (2nd season)
- Home stadium: Chico High School Stadium

1953 Far Western Conference football standings
	Conf.					Overall
Team	W		L		T	W		L		T
Chico State $	4	–	0	–	1	6	–	3	–	1
Humboldt State	2	–	1	–	0	6	–	2	–	0
Cal Aggies	1	–	2	–	1	1	–	6	–	1
San Francisco State	0	–	1	–	0	5	–	3	–	0
Southern Oregon	0	–	3	–	0	3	–	4	–	0
$ – Conference champion; Conference records includes both Chico State vs. Cal Aggies games

The 1953 Chico State Wildcats football team represented Chico State College—now known as California State University, Chico—as a member of the Far Western Conference (FWC) during the 1953 college football season. Led by Ernie Busch in his second and final season as head coach, Chico State compiled an overall record of 6–3–1 with a mark of 4–0–1 in conference play, winning the FWC title. The team outscored its opponents 150 to 133 for the season. The Wildcats played home games at Chico High School Stadium in Chico, California.

The team included 14 returning lettermen and 16 junior college transfers. Before the season began, improved expectations for the team's performance caused ticket sales to "soar to a new high."

On November 13, Chico State played the Cal Aggies to a scoreless tie in six inches of rain and 40 mile per hour winds, as a fierce storm also caused the press box to collapse during the game.

At the end of the season, four Chico State players were selected for the All-Far Western Conference football team: guard Gene Van der Leun, end George Maderos, and backs Hal Higgins and Carroll Campbell. Busch finished his tenure as Chico State with an overall record of 7–9–1, for a .441 winning percentage.

== Schedule ==
Date	Opponent	Site	Result	Attendance	Source
September 19	Presidio of San Francisco (Note: The Presidio of San Francisco was an Army fort from 1848 to 1996. For many years they fielded a team that played against colleges and other military teams.)*	Chico High School Stadium; Chico, CA	W 14–7		
September 26	Cal Aggies	Chico High School Stadium; Chico, CA	W 14–7		
October 3	Naval Station Treasure Island*	Chico High School Stadium; Chico, CA	W 21–0		
October 10	at Nevada*	Mackay Stadium (Note: This stadium is the predecessor to the current Mackay Stadium, which was opened for the 1966 season.); Reno, NV	L 7–27		
October 17	at Southern Oregon	Fuller Field; Ashland, OR	W 26–7		
October 24	San Francisco State	Chico High School Stadium; Chico, CA	W 13–0		
October 31	Humboldt State^{†}	Chico High School Stadium; Chico, CA	W 14–13	4,100	
November 7	at Linfield*	Maxwell Field; McMinnville, OR	L 13–20		
November 13	at Cal Aggies	Aggie Field; Davis, CA	T 0–0		
November 21	at University of Mexico*	Estadio Olímpico Universitario; Mexico City, Mexico	L 28–52		
*Non-conference game; ^{†}Homecoming
