= 1953 Fresno State Bulldogs football team =

American college football season

1953 Fresno State Bulldogs football
- Conference: California Collegiate Athletic Association
- Record: 4–4–2 (2–2–1 CCAA)
- Head coach: Clark Van Galder (2nd season)
- Home stadium: Ratcliffe Stadium

1953 California Collegiate Athletic Association football standings
| | Conf. | | | | | Overall |
| Team | W | | L | | T | W | | L | | T |
|---|---|---|---|---|---|---|---|---|---|---|
| Cal Poly $ | 5 | – | 0 | – | 0 | 9 | – | 0 | – | 0 |
| San Diego State | 3 | – | 1 | – | 1 | 5 | – | 3 | – | 1 |
| Fresno State | 2 | – | 2 | – | 1 | 4 | – | 4 | – | 2 |
| Pepperdine | 2 | – | 3 | – | 0 | 3 | – | 6 | – | 0 |
| Santa Barbara | 1 | – | 4 | – | 0 | 2 | – | 6 | – | 1 |
| Los Angeles State | 1 | – | 4 | – | 0 | 2 | – | 7 | – | 0 |
$ – Conference champion

The 1953 Fresno State Bulldogs football team represented Fresno State College—now known as California State University, Fresno—as a member of the California Collegiate Athletic Association (CCAA) during the 1953 college football season. The Bulldogs rejoined CCAA after having played as an independent in the 1951 and 1952 seasons. Led by second-year head coach Clark Van Galder, Fresno State compiled an overall record of 4–4–2 with a mark of 2–2–1 in conference play, placing third in the CCAA. The Bulldogs played home games at Ratcliffe Stadium on the campus of Fresno City College in Fresno, California.

== Schedule ==
| Date | Opponent | Site | Result | Attendance | Source |
|---|---|---|---|---|---|
| September 26 | Cal Poly | Ratcliffe Stadium; Fresno, CA | L 6–27 | 5,298 | |
| October 3 | San Jose State* | Ratcliffe Stadium; Fresno, CA (rivalry) | L 21–27 | 5,574 | |
| October 9 | Los Angeles State | L.A. State Stadium; Los Angeles, CA | L 12–14 | 2,000 | |
| October 17 | Nevada* | Ratcliffe Stadium; Fresno, CA | W 47–7 | 9,600 | |
| October 24 | Santa Barbara | Ratcliffe Stadium; Fresno, CA | W 20–0 | 7,188 | |
| October 31 | San Diego State | Ratcliffe Stadium; Fresno, CA (rivalry) | T 27–27 | 6,212 | |
| November 7 | at Utah State* | Romney Stadium (Note: This stadium is the predecessor to the current Maverik Stadium (Romney Stadium) that has served as the home of the Aggies since 1968); Logan, UT | L 6–46 | | |
| November 11 | San Francisco State* | Ratcliffe Stadium; Fresno, CA | W 41–27 | 6,250 | |
| November 14 | Pepperdine | Ratcliffe Stadium; Fresno, CA | W 54–2 | 5,224 | |
| November 21 | at Pacific (CA)* | Pacific Memorial Stadium; Stockton, CA | T 21–21 | 8,906 | |
*Non-conference game

== Team players in the NFL ==
The following were selected in the 1954 NFL draft.

| Player | Position | Round | Overall | NFL team |
| Ledio Fanucchi | Tackle | 22 | 254 | Chicago Cardinals |
