= 1953 Cal Poly Mustangs football team =

American college football season

1953 Cal Poly Mustangs football

CCAA champion
- Conference: California Collegiate Athletic Association
- Record: 9–0 (5–0 CCAA)
- Head coach: LeRoy Hughes (4th season)
- Home stadium: Mustang Stadium

1953 California Collegiate Athletic Association football standings
	Conf.					Overall
Team	W		L		T	W		L		T
Cal Poly $	5	–	0	–	0	9	–	0	–	0
San Diego State	3	–	1	–	1	5	–	3	–	1
Fresno State	2	–	2	–	1	4	–	4	–	2
Pepperdine	2	–	3	–	0	3	–	6	–	0
Santa Barbara	1	–	4	–	0	2	–	6	–	1
Los Angeles State	1	–	4	–	0	2	–	7	–	0
$ – Conference champion

The 1953 Cal Poly Mustangs football team represented California Polytechnic State College—now known as California Polytechnic State University, San Luis Obispo—as a member of the California Collegiate Athletic Association (CCAA) during the 1953 college football season. Led by fourth-year head coach LeRoy Hughes, Cal Poly compiled an overall record of 9–0 with a mark of 5–0 in conference play, winning the CCAA title for the second consecutive season. The team was dominant in every game, scoring 395 points while allowing only 65. The Mustangs played home games at Mustang Stadium in San Luis Obispo, California.

== Schedule ==
Date	Opponent	Site	Result	Attendance	Source
September 26	at Fresno State	Ratcliffe Stadium; Fresno, CA	W 27–6	6,427	
October 3	at San Diego State	Aztec Bowl; San Diego, CA	W 33–12	9,000	
October 10	Santa Barbara	Mustang Stadium; San Luis Obispo, CA	W 59–6		
October 16	at San Francisco State*	Cox Stadium; San Francisco, CA	W 46–14		
October 24	at Pepperdine	El Camino Stadium; Torrance, CA	W 45–0		
October 30	at Whittier*	Memorial Stadium; Whittier, CA	W 31–14		
November 7	Los Angeles State	Mustang Stadium; San Luis Obispo, CA	W 51–0		
November 14	Redlands*	Mustang Stadium; San Luis Obispo, CA	W 51–6		
November 21	Willamette*	Mustang Stadium; San Luis Obispo, CA	W 52–7		
*Non-conference game

== Team players in the NFL ==
The following were selected in the 1954 NFL draft.

Player	Position	Round	Overall	NFL team
Alex Bravo	Defensive back	9	106	Los Angeles Rams
Bob Lawson	Back	9	109	Detroit Lions
Stan Sheriff	Linebacker, guard, center	18	214	Los Angeles Rams
