= 1953 Colorado A&M Aggies football team =

American college football season

1953 Colorado A&M Aggies football
- Conference: Skyline Conference
- Record: 4–5 (3–4 Skyline)
- Head coach: Bob Davis (7th season)
- Home stadium: Colorado Field

1953 Skyline Conference football standings
	Conf.					Overall
Team	W		L		T	W		L		T
Utah $	5	–	0	–	0	8	–	2	–	0
Utah State	5	–	2	–	0	8	–	3	–	0
Wyoming	4	–	2	–	1	5	–	4	–	1
New Mexico	3	–	2	–	1	5	–	3	–	1
Colorado A&M	3	–	4	–	0	4	–	5	–	0
Montana	2	–	4	–	0	3	–	5	–	0
Denver	1	–	5	–	1	3	–	5	–	2
BYU	1	–	5	–	1	2	–	7	–	1
$ – Conference champion

The 1953 Colorado A&M Aggies football team represented Colorado State College of Agriculture and Mechanic Arts in the Skyline Conference during the 1953 college football season. In their seventh season under head coach Bob Davis, the Aggies compiled a 4–5 record (3–4 against Skyline opponents), finished fifth in the Skyline Conference, and outscored all opponents by a total of 157 to 149.

No Colorado A&M players were selected by the Associated Press for its 1953 All-Skyline Conference football team.

== Schedule ==
Date	Opponent	Site	Result	Attendance	Source
September 26	Kansas State*	Colorado Field; Fort Collins, CO	W 14–13	10,500	
October 3	Denver	Colorado Field; Fort Collins, CO	W 21–6	8,500–9,000	
October 10	at Wyoming	War Memorial Stadium; Laramie, WY (rivalry)	L 14–21	13,171	
October 17	at Montana	Dornblaser Field; Missoula, MT	L 31–32	7,300	
October 24	Utah State^{†}	Colorado Field; Fort Collins, CO	L 13–14	6,264	
November 7	at BYU	Cougar Stadium; Provo, UT	W 34–12	9,000	
November 14	at Utah	Ute Stadium; Salt Lake City, UT	L 14–35	13,089	
November 21	New Mexico	Colorado Field; Fort Collins, CO	W 9–3	3,878	
November 28	Colorado*	Colorado Field; Fort Collins, CO (rivalry)	L 7–13	7,549	
*Non-conference game; ^{†}Homecoming
