= 1953 New Mexico Lobos football team =

American college football season

1953 New Mexico Lobos football
- Conference: Skyline Conference
- Record: 5–3–1 (3–2–1 Skyline)
- Head coach: Bob Titchenal (1st season)
- Home stadium: Zimmerman Field

1953 Skyline Conference football standings
	Conf.					Overall
Team	W		L		T	W		L		T
Utah $	5	–	0	–	0	8	–	2	–	0
Utah State	5	–	2	–	0	8	–	3	–	0
Wyoming	4	–	2	–	1	5	–	4	–	1
New Mexico	3	–	2	–	1	5	–	3	–	1
Colorado A&M	3	–	4	–	0	4	–	5	–	0
Montana	2	–	4	–	0	3	–	5	–	0
Denver	1	–	5	–	1	3	–	5	–	2
BYU	1	–	5	–	1	2	–	7	–	1
$ – Conference champion

The 1953 New Mexico Lobos football team represented the University of New Mexico in the Skyline Conference during the 1953 college football season. In their first season under head coach Bob Titchenal, the Lobos compiled a 5–3–1 record (3–2–1 against Skyline opponents), finished fourth in the conference, and outscored all opponents by a total of 154 to 103.

New Mexico center Larry White was selected by the Associated Press (AP) as a first-team player on the 1953 All-Skyline Conference football team. Three other New Mexico players received second-team honors: end Ray Guerette, guard Ralph Matteuchi, and tailback Bobby Lee. Lee ranked third in the Skyline Conference with 624 rushing yards on 110 carries (5.7 yards per carry).

Bob Titchenal, who had previously been an assistant coach for Denver, was selected by the AP as the Skyline Conference coach of the year.

== Schedule ==
Date	Opponent	Site	Result	Attendance	Source
September 26	at Utah State	Romney Stadium; Logan, UT	L 0–6	9,000	
October 3	BYU	Zimmerman Field; Albuquerque, NM	T 12–12	6,500	
October 10	at Arizona*	Arizona Stadium; Tucson, AZ (rivalry)	L 0–20	16,000	
October 17	San Diego State*	Zimmerman Field; Albuquerque, NM	W 41–12	8,000	
October 24	at Montana	Dornblaser Field; Missoula, MT	W 41–13	5,000	
October 31	Denver^{†}	Zimmerman Field; Albuquerque, NM	W 20–18	12,500	
November 7	at New Mexico A&M*	Memorial Stadium; Las Cruces, NM (rivalry)	W 28–6		
November 14	Wyoming	Zimmerman Field; Albuquerque, NM	W 9–7	13,000	
November 21	at Colorado A&M	Colorado Field; Fort Collins, CO	L 3–9	3,878	
*Non-conference game; ^{†}Homecoming
