= 1953 Stanford Indians football team =

American college football season

1953 Stanford Indians football
- Conference: Pacific Coast Conference

Ranking
- Coaches: No. 17
- AP: No. 19
- Record: 6–3–1 (5–1–1 PCC)
- Head coach: Chuck Taylor (3rd season)
- Home stadium: Stanford Stadium

1953 Pacific Coast Conference football standings
	Conf.					Overall
Team	W		L		T	W		L		T
No. 5 UCLA $	6	–	1	–	0	8	–	2	–	0
No. 19 Stanford	5	–	1	–	1	6	–	3	–	1
USC	4	–	2	–	1	6	–	3	–	1
California	2	–	2	–	2	4	–	4	–	2
Washington State	3	–	4	–	0	4	–	6	–	0
Oregon State	3	–	5	–	0	3	–	6	–	0
Washington	2	–	4	–	1	3	–	6	–	1
Oregon	2	–	5	–	1	4	–	5	–	1
Idaho	0	–	3	–	0	1	–	8	–	0
$ – Conference champion; Rankings from AP Poll

The 1953 Stanford Indians football team represented Stanford University in the 1953 college football season. The team was led by Chuck Taylor in his third year, and by quarterback Bobby Garrett, who would win the season's W. J. Voit Memorial Trophy as most outstanding player on the Pacific Coast, and was selected by the Cleveland Browns as the first pick of the NFL draft at the end of the season.

The team played their home games at Stanford Stadium in Stanford, California.

== Schedule ==
Date	Opponent	Rank	Site	Result	Attendance	Source
September 19	Pacific (CA)*		Stanford Stadium; Stanford, CA	L 20–25	10,500	
September 26	Oregon		Stanford Stadium; Stanford, CA	W 7–0	14,500	
October 3	Illinois*		Memorial Stadium; Champaign, IL	L 21–33	32,737	
October 10	at Oregon State		Multnomah Stadium; Portland, OR	W 21–0	8,005	
October 17	No. 4 UCLA		Stanford Stadium; Stanford, CA	W 21–20	45,000	
October 24	at Washington	No. 20	Husky Stadium; Seattle, WA	W 13–7	39,000	
October 31	Washington State	No. 17	Stanford Stadium; Stanford, CA	W 48–19	18,500	
November 7	at No. 17 USC	No. 11	Los Angeles Memorial Coliseum; Los Angeles, CA (rivalry)	L 20–23	79,015	
November 14	San Jose State*	No. 16	Stanford Stadium; Stanford, CA (rivalry)	W 54–0	12,000	
November 21	California	No. 16	Stanford Stadium; Stanford, CA (Big Game)	T 21–21	92,500	
*Non-conference game; Rankings from AP Poll released prior to the game; Source:

== Game summaries ==
=== California ===
Team	1	2	3	4	Total
Bears	0	7	7	7	21
Indians	0	7	14	0	21

- Date: November 21
- Location: Stanford Stadium, Stanford, California
- Game attendance: 92,500

Scoring summary
2	STAN	Sam Morley 5 yard-pass from Bobby Garrett (Garrett kick)	STAN 7–0
2	CAL	Don Whyte 8-yard run (Paul Larson kick)	Tied 7–7
3	STAN	Barry Smith recovered fumble in end zone (Garrett kick)	STAN 14–7
3	STAN	Garrett 54-yard interception return (Garrett kick)	STAN 21–7
3	CAL	Larson 19-yard run (Larson kick)	STAN 21–14
4	CAL	Al Talley 3-yard run (Larson kick)	Tied 21–21

With a win in the Big Game, Stanford would earn a berth in the 1954 Rose Bowl. California had not lost a Big Game since 1946, and this game was no exception: California intercepted quarterback Garrett five times and scored twice late to force a 21–21 tie. The tie, coupled with UCLA's victory over rival USC, denied the Indians a second Rose Bowl appearance in three years.

== Players drafted by the NFL ==
Player	Position	Round	Pick	NFL club
Bobby Garrett	Quarterback	1	1	Cleveland Browns
John Steinberg	End	10	113	New York Giants
Sam Morley	End	20	236	Washington Redskins
Marv Tennefoss	End	24	279	Green Bay Packers
