= 1953 Hawaii Rainbows football team =

American college football season

1953 Hawaii Rainbows football
- Conference: Independent
- Record: 5–6
- Head coach: Hank Vasconcellos (2nd season)
- Home stadium: Honolulu Stadium

1953 Western college football independents records
	Conf.			Overall
Team	W	L	T	W		L		T
Pacific (CA)		–		4	–	4	–	2
San Jose State		–		4	–	4	–	1
Hawaii		–		5	–	6	–	0
Nevada		–		2	–	3	–	0
La Verne		–		3	–	7	–	0
Cal Poly San Dimas		–		2	–	6	–	0

The 1953 Hawaii Rainbows football team represented the University of Hawaiʻi at Mānoa as an independent during the 1953 college football season. In their second season under head coach Hank Vasconcellos, the Rainbows compiled a 5–6 record.

== Schedule ==
Date	Opponent	Site	Result	Attendance	Source
September 4	Islanders	Honolulu Stadium; Honolulu, Territory of Hawaii	W 13–6	22,000	
September 17	MCAS Kaneohe Bay	Honolulu Stadium; Honolulu, Territory of Hawaii	W 22–13	7,500	
September 26	at San Diego State	Aztec Bowl; San Diego, CA	L 7–40	8,500	
October 3	at Utah	Ute Stadium; Salt Lake City, UT	L 24–47	13,225	
October 10	at Pacific (CA)	Pacific Memorial Stadium; Stockton, CA	L 8–26	10,659–11,000	
October 21	Naval Station Pearl Harbor	Honolulu Stadium; Honolulu, Territory of Hawaii	L 7–12		
November 1	Hawaii 49ers	Honolulu Stadium; Honolulu, Territory of Hawaii	L 13–27	6,000	
November 8	Pacific Army	Honolulu Stadium; Honolulu, Territory of Hawaii	W 28–6		
November 15	Barbers Point NAS	Honolulu Stadium; Honolulu, Territory of Hawaii	W 26–0	500	
November 22	Naval Station Pearl Harbor	Honolulu Stadium; Honolulu, Territory of Hawaii	L 7–27	3,000	
December 4	Lewis & Clark^{†}	Honolulu Stadium; Honolulu, Territory of Hawaii	W 34–12	7,500	
^{†}Homecoming
