= 1953 Oregon State Beavers football team =

American college football season

1953 Oregon State Beavers football
- Head coach Kip Taylor
- Conference: Pacific Coast Conference
- Record: 3–6 (3–5 PCC)
- Head coach: Kip Taylor (5th season)
- Home stadium: Multnomah Stadium; Parker Stadium

1953 Pacific Coast Conference football standings
	Conf.					Overall
Team	W		L		T	W		L		T
No. 5 UCLA $	6	–	1	–	0	8	–	2	–	0
No. 19 Stanford	5	–	1	–	1	6	–	3	–	1
USC	4	–	2	–	1	6	–	3	–	1
California	2	–	2	–	2	4	–	4	–	2
Washington State	3	–	4	–	0	4	–	6	–	0
Oregon State	3	–	5	–	0	3	–	6	–	0
Washington	2	–	4	–	1	3	–	6	–	1
Oregon	2	–	5	–	1	4	–	5	–	1
Idaho	0	–	3	–	0	1	–	8	–	0
$ – Conference champion; Rankings from AP Poll

The 1953 Oregon State Beavers football team represented Oregon State College as a member of the Pacific Coast Conference (PCC) during the 1953 college football season. In their fifth season under head coach Kip Taylor, the Beavers compiled an overall record of 3–6 record with a mark of 3–5 in conference play, placing sixth in the PCC. The team was outscored 187 to 39 on the season. Oregon State opened with five shutout losses, then visited and shut out the Idaho Vandals, 19–0, for their first points and win.

The Beavers played two home games at Multnomah Stadium in Portland and opened the new Parker Stadium in Corvallis on November 14 with a 7–0 homecoming win over Washington State, then won their fifth consecutive Civil War game over Oregon, this year on the road, in Eugene.

== Schedule ==
Date	Opponent	Site	Result	Attendance	Source
September 18	at No. 4 UCLA	Los Angeles Memorial Coliseum; Los Angeles, CA	L 0–41	39,209	
September 26	No. 14 California	Multnomah Stadium; Portland, OR	L 0–26	13,442	
October 3	at Washington	Husky Stadium; Seattle, WA	L 0–28	28,000	
October 10	Stanford	Multnomah Stadium; Portland, OR	L 0–21	8,005	
October 17	at No. 13 USC	Los Angeles Memorial Coliseum; Los Angeles, CA	L 0–37	34,163	
October 24	at Idaho	Neale Stadium; Moscow, ID	W 19–0	9,200	
October 31	at No. 6 Michigan State*	Macklin Stadium; East Lansing, MI	L 6–34	51,108	
November 14	Washington State^{†}	Parker Stadium; Corvallis, OR	W 7–0	13,500	
November 21	at Oregon	Hayward Field; Eugene, OR (Civil War)	W 7–0	18,500	
*Non-conference game; ^{†}Homecoming; Rankings from AP Poll released prior to the game; Source:
