= 1953 Wyoming Cowboys football team =

American college football season

1953 Wyoming Cowboys football
- Conference: Skyline Conference
- Record: 5–4–1 (4–2–1 Skyline)
- Head coach: Phil Dickens (1st season)
- Captain: Dale Haupt
- Home stadium: War Memorial Stadium

1953 Skyline Conference football standings
	Conf.					Overall
Team	W		L		T	W		L		T
Utah $	5	–	0	–	0	8	–	2	–	0
Utah State	5	–	2	–	0	8	–	3	–	0
Wyoming	4	–	2	–	1	5	–	4	–	1
New Mexico	3	–	2	–	1	5	–	3	–	1
Colorado A&M	3	–	4	–	0	4	–	5	–	0
Montana	2	–	4	–	0	3	–	5	–	0
Denver	1	–	5	–	1	3	–	5	–	2
BYU	1	–	5	–	1	2	–	7	–	1
$ – Conference champion

The 1953 Wyoming Cowboys football team was an American football team that represented the University of Wyoming as a member of the Skyline Conference during the 1953 college football season. In their first season under head coach Phil Dickens, the Cowboys compiled a 5–4–1 record (4–2–1 against Skyline opponents), finished third in the conference, and outscored opponents by a total of 195 to 110.

== Schedule ==
Date	Opponent	Site	Result	Attendance	Source
September 19	New Mexico A&M*	War Memorial Stadium; Laramie, WY	W 47–0	7,188	
September 26	at Montana	Dornblaser Field; Missoula, MT	W 27–7	5,248	
October 3	Utah State	War Memorial Stadium; Laramie, WY (rivalry)	W 20–13	8,764	
October 10	Colorado A&M	War Memorial Stadium; Laramie, WY (rivalry)	W 21–14	13,171	
October 17	at Iowa*	Iowa Stadium; Iowa City, IA	L 7–21	29,000	
October 24	at Utah	Ute Stadium; Salt Lake City, UT	L 12–13	12,429	
October 31	BYU^{†}	War Memorial Stadium; Laramie, WY	W 27–0	11,236	
November 7	at Oklahoma A&M*	Lewis Field; Stillwater, OK	L 14–20	19,000	
November 14	at New Mexico	Zimmerman Field; Albuquerque, NM	L 7–9	13,000	
November 26	at Denver	DU Stadium; Denver, CO	T 13–13	13,299	
*Non-conference game; ^{†}Homecoming
