= 1953 BYU Cougars football team =

American college football season

1953 BYU Cougars football
- Conference: Skyline Conference
- Record: 2–7–1 (1–5–1 Skyline Six)
- Head coach: Chick Atkinson (5th season)
- Home stadium: Cougar Stadium

1953 Skyline Conference football standings
	Conf.					Overall
Team	W		L		T	W		L		T
Utah $	5	–	0	–	0	8	–	2	–	0
Utah State	5	–	2	–	0	8	–	3	–	0
Wyoming	4	–	2	–	1	5	–	4	–	1
New Mexico	3	–	2	–	1	5	–	3	–	1
Colorado A&M	3	–	4	–	0	4	–	5	–	0
Montana	2	–	4	–	0	3	–	5	–	0
Denver	1	–	5	–	1	3	–	5	–	2
BYU	1	–	5	–	1	2	–	7	–	1
$ – Conference champion

The 1953 BYU Cougars football team was an American football team that represented Brigham Young University (BYU) as a member of the Skyline Conference during the 1953 college football season. In their fifth season under head coach Chick Atkinson, the Cougars compiled an overall record of 2–7–1 with a mark of 1–5–1 against conference opponents, tied for seventh in the Skyline, and were outscored by a total of 228 to 172.

The team's statistical leaders included LaVon Satterfield with 682 yards of total offense (114 rushing, 568 passing), Reed Stolworthy with 473 rushing yards, and Dick Felt with 30 points scored.

== Schedule ==
Date	Opponent	Site	Result	Attendance	Source
September 19	Montana	Cougar Stadium; Provo, UT	W 27–13	4,500	
September 25	San Jose State*	Cougar Stadium; Provo, UT	L 25–28	6,000	
October 3	at New Mexico	Zimmerman Field; Albuquerque, NM	T 12–12	6,500	
October 10	vs. Idaho*	Bronco Stadium; Boise, ID	W 20–14	8,600	
October 16	Utah State	Cougar Stadium; Provo, UT (rivalry)	L 7–14	10,000	
October 23	at Denver	DU Stadium; Denver, CO	L 19–27	5,168	
October 31	at Wyoming	War Memorial Stadium; Laramie, WY	L 0–27	11,236	
November 7	Colorado A&M	Cougar Stadium; Provo, UT	L 12–34	9,000	
November 14	at Arizona State*	Goodwin Stadium; Tempe, AZ	L 18–26	13,500	
November 26	at Utah	Ute Stadium; Salt Lake City, UT (rivalry)	L 32–33	20,189	
*Non-conference game
