= Custer County District High School =

School in Miles City, Montana, United States

Location
- 20 South Center Ave; Miles City, (Custer County), Montana 59301; United States; 46°24′27″N 105°50′24″W

Information
- Type: Public, Coeducational high school
- Motto: Go Big Blue!
- Established: 1893
- School district: Custer County School District
- Local authority: Custer County
- Principal: Vince Gundlach
- Teaching staff: 30.94 (FTE)
- Grades: 9–12
- Enrollment: 492 (2023–2024)
- Student to teacher ratio: 15.90
- Campus: Suburban
- Colors: Blue and Gold
- Team name: Cowboys & Cowgirls
- Rival: Glendive Red Devils, Billings Central Catholic High School Rams
- Accreditation: NAAS (Northwest Association of Accredited Schools)
- Newspaper: Signal Butte
- Yearbook: Branding Iron
- Website: Website

Custer County District High School is a public high school located in Miles City, Montana, the county seat and largest town in Custer County, of the state of Montana, (United States). It is a part of the public schools system of the Custer County School District.

== History ==
Established in the late 1880s when the State of Montana was still the old Montana Territory and Miles City was one of its largest and main new towns, the new "Miles City High School" graduated its first student in 1893. A decade later, in 1903, the school added the highest twelfth grade and changed its name to the "Custer County High School" reflecting its larger population base, which had its first graduates the following year in 1904. The first high school building site for Miles City and Custer County was at the location of the current Washington Middle School, but it was then was a multi-story building located in the northeastern part of the town, next to the Roman Catholic Church's Ursuline Convent of the Sacred Heart. In 1922, a new second building for C.C.H.S. was constructed at the current location on South Center Avenue. Additional wings were added in the early-1960s. These newer buildings contained additional classrooms and a gymnasium, and were connected to the older 1920s era building with an enclosed ramp.

The name of the secondary school was changed from just "Custer County High School" to the "Custer County District High School" as a result of combining the elected school boards for the elementary and the high school to one single administration in the late 1960s.

== Notable alumni ==
- Kurt Alme, attorney and former United States Attorney for the District of Montana (2017–2020) under the administration of 45th President Donald J. Trump and government official
- Caleb Frare (born 1993), Major League Baseball player in the American League, for the Chicago White Sox
- Maurice Hilleman (1919–2005), microbiologist who developed over 36 vaccines, saving millions of lives; class of 1938
- Elmer Holt, (1884–1945), tenth Governor of Montana (1935–1937), old Miles City High School, class of 1899
- Major General (ret.) James A. Ulio (1882–1958), served as Adjutant General of the United States Army, (1942–1946) during World War II (1939/1941-1945), also of old M.C.H.S., class of 1899
- George Winston (1949–2023), pianist
