= 1953 Oregon Ducks football team =

American college football season

1953 Oregon Ducks football
- Conference: Pacific Coast Conference
- Record: 4–5–1 (2–5–1 PCC)
- Head coach: Len Casanova (3rd season)
- Captain: Emery Barnes
- Home stadium: Hayward Field, Multnomah Stadium

1953 Pacific Coast Conference football standings
	Conf.					Overall
Team	W		L		T	W		L		T
No. 5 UCLA $	6	–	1	–	0	8	–	2	–	0
No. 19 Stanford	5	–	1	–	1	6	–	3	–	1
USC	4	–	2	–	1	6	–	3	–	1
California	2	–	2	–	2	4	–	4	–	2
Washington State	3	–	4	–	0	4	–	6	–	0
Oregon State	3	–	5	–	0	3	–	6	–	0
Washington	2	–	4	–	1	3	–	6	–	1
Oregon	2	–	5	–	1	4	–	5	–	1
Idaho	0	–	3	–	0	1	–	8	–	0
$ – Conference champion; Rankings from AP Poll

The 1953 Oregon Ducks football team represented the University of Oregon as a member of the Pacific Coast Conference (PCC) during the 1953 college football season. In their third season under head coach Len Casanova, the Ducks compiled a 4–5–1 record (2–5–1 against PCC opponents), finished in eighth place in the PCC, and outscored their opponents, 91 to 85. The team played its home games at Hayward Field in Eugene, Oregon.

== Schedule ==
Date	Time	Opponent	Site	TV	Result	Attendance	Source
September 19		at Nebraska*	Memorial Stadium; Lincoln, NE	NBC	W 20–12	31,000	
September 26		at Stanford	Stanford Stadium; Stanford, CA		L 0–7	14,500	
October 3		No. 5 UCLA	Hayward Field; Eugene, OR		L 0–12	24,587	
October 10		at Washington State	Rogers Field; Pullman, WA		L 0–7	16,000	
October 17		Washington	Multnomah Stadium; Portland, OR (rivalry)		L 6–14	21,677	
October 24		San Jose State*	Hayward Field; Eugene, OR		W 26–13	11,500	
October 31		No. 7 USC	Multnomah Stadium; Portland, OR		W 13–7	17,772	
November 7	1:30 p.m.	Idaho	Hayward Field; Eugene, OR		W 25–6	10,000	
November 14		at California	California Memorial Stadium; Berkeley, CA		T 0–0	24,000	
November 21		Oregon State	Hayward Field; Eugene, OR (Civil War)		L 0–7	18,500	
*Non-conference game; Rankings from AP Poll released prior to the game; Source:
