= Pepperdine Waves football =

- First season: 1946
- Last season: 1961
- Location: Los Angeles, California
- Stadium: Sentinel Field
- Conference: Independent
- Colors: Blue, white, and orange
- All-time record: 64–79–2 (.448)
- Bowl record: 1–0 (1.000)

The Pepperdine Waves football program represented Pepperdine University, then located in Los Angeles, California, in college football. Pepperdine discontinued football in 1961, citing cost concerns.

== History ==
The program began in 1946. The school then called itself George Pepperdine College. In their first season the team went 8-1-0, including a 38-13 victory over the Nebraska Wesleyan Plainsmen in the Will Rogers Bowl. The Pepperdine Board of Trustees ended the football program after the 1961 season, judging the cost of fielding a competitive team too high. Although Pepperdine played basketball in the West Coast Athletic Conference, the football program competed as an independent. Between 1949–1954 the football program competed in the California Collegiate Athletic Association.

== Home venues ==
Pepperdine called multiple stadiums home during the short tenure of its program. From 1946–1947, 1949, and 1959–1961 the Waves played at Sentinel Field in Inglewood, California. For 1948 they played at Wrigley Field in Los Angeles, a baseball stadium and the home of the Los Angeles Angels of the Pacific Coast League. In 1950 Pepperdine moved to Gilmore Stadium for a season, but that facility's imminent demolition required yet another change. From 1951–1958 Pepperdine played at El Camino Stadium in Torrance, California.

== Head coaches ==
Coach	Years	Record	Pct.
Warren Gaer	1946–1948	21–6	.778
Ray Richards	1949–1950	8–10	.444
Duck Dowell	1951–1952	7–11–1	.395
Gordon McEachron	1953–1954	9–8	.529
John Scolinos	1955–1959	17–26–1	.398
Pence Dacus	1960–1961	2–18	.100
Totals	6 coaches	64–79–2	.448
