= Raymond A. Curfman =

American football player and coach (1915–1993)

Biographical details
- Born: June 16, 1915
- Died: April 5, 1993 (aged 77); Tucson, Arizona, U.S.

Playing career
- 1936–1937: Texas Tech
- Positions: End, quarterback

Coaching career (HC unless noted)
- 1945: Barksdale Field
- 1946–1947: New Mexico A&M
- 1949–1950: Idaho (ends)
- 1951–1953: Idaho

Administrative career (AD unless noted)
- 1947–1949: New Mexico A&M

Head coaching record
- Overall: 19–37–1

Accomplishments and honors

Records
- Military career
- Allegiance: United States
- Branch: U.S. Army Air Forces
- Rank: Lieutenant
- Conflicts: World War II

Raymond A. "Babe" Curfman (June 16, 1915 – April 5, 1993) was an American football player and coach. He was the head coach at the New Mexico College of Agriculture and Mechanic Arts in Las Cruces (now New Mexico State University), from 1946 to 1947 and at the University of Idaho in Moscow from 1951 to 1953, compiling a career college football record of 15–30–1.

== Coaching career ==
After a brief stay as a player with the Brooklyn Dodgers of the National Football League (NFL) in 1938, Curfman coached at the high school level in Texas and New Mexico, at Tulia, Santa Rosa, and Las Cruces. His 1942 Las Cruces basketball team advanced to the state finals. Curfman served as a lieutenant in the Army Air Corps in World War II.

From 1946 to 1947, Curfman was the head coach at New Mexico A&M, then in the Border Conference, where he compiled an 8–11 record. He resigned in December to work in the sporting goods industry in Texas, then joined the staff of third-year head coach Dixie Howell at Idaho in February 1949. Two years later, Howell and Curfman submitted their resignations in March 1951, and Curfman remained on campus as an interim coach for the upcoming 1951 spring drills. The administration was impressed with his handling of the team during the first week of practice and hired him as head coach in mid-April. He guided the Vandals for three seasons in the Pacific Coast Conference and compiled a .278 record. His salary in his final year at Idaho in 1953 was $7,920.

Curfman made headlines during the 1953 season as his overmatched Vandals struggled in conference play in the PCC. Following his resignation as Idaho head coach in December, he was hired as the business manager for the Spokane Indians minor league baseball team in January 1954.

He later coached high school football back in Texas, at Pampa (1958–1961) and Pecos (1962–1964).

Curfman died at age 77 in 1993 in Tucson, Arizona; he and his wife are buried at the East Lawn Palms Cemetery in Tucson.

== Head coaching record ==
Year	Team	Overall	Conference	Standing	Bowl/playoffs
Barksdale Field Sky Raiders (Independent) (1945)
1945	Barksdale Field	4–7			
Barksdale Field:		4–7			
New Mexico A&M Aggies (Border Conference) (1946–1947)
1946	New Mexico A&M	5–5	1–4	9th	
1947	New Mexico A&M	3–6	1–4	8th	
New Mexico A&M:		8–11	2–8		
Idaho Vandals (Pacific Coast Conference) (1951–1953)
1951	Idaho	2–7	0–3	9th	
1952	Idaho	4–4–1	1–3	8th	
1953	Idaho	1–8	0–3	9th	
Idaho:		7–19–1	1–9		
Total:		19–37–1			
