= 1953 California Golden Bears football team =

American college football season

1953 California Golden Bears football
- Conference: Pacific Coast Conference
- Record: 4–4–2 (2–2–2 PCC)
- Head coach: Pappy Waldorf (7th season)
- Home stadium: California Memorial Stadium

1953 Pacific Coast Conference football standings
	Conf.					Overall
Team	W		L		T	W		L		T
No. 5 UCLA $	6	–	1	–	0	8	–	2	–	0
No. 19 Stanford	5	–	1	–	1	6	–	3	–	1
USC	4	–	2	–	1	6	–	3	–	1
California	2	–	2	–	2	4	–	4	–	2
Washington State	3	–	4	–	0	4	–	6	–	0
Oregon State	3	–	5	–	0	3	–	6	–	0
Washington	2	–	4	–	1	3	–	6	–	1
Oregon	2	–	5	–	1	4	–	5	–	1
Idaho	0	–	3	–	0	1	–	8	–	0
$ – Conference champion; Rankings from AP Poll

The 1953 California Golden Bears football team was an American football team that represented the University of California, Berkeley in the Pacific Coast Conference (PCC) during the 1953 college football season. Under seventh-year head coach Pappy Waldorf, the Golden Bears compiled an overall record of 4–4–2 (2–2–2 in PCC, fourth). Home games were played on campus at California Memorial Stadium in Berkeley, California.

The 1953 season is partially associated with a recruiting scandal involving star freshman quarterback Ronnie Knox. In order to have Knox enroll at the university, the California football booster club promised him that Knox's step father to be hired as a scout, his high school coach would be hired as an assistant coach, and that Knox himself would be given a job writing for a local newspaper and also be paid $500 per year by the booster club. Knox enrolled at Cal but California's administration found out and made sure that the benefits would not be provided. After one year at Cal, Knox transferred to University of California, Los Angeles (UCLA).

== Schedule ==
Date	Opponent	Rank	Site	Result	Attendance	Source
September 19	No. 20 Baylor*	No. 14	California Memorial Stadium; Berkeley, CA	L 0–25	34,000	
September 26	at Oregon State	No. 14	Multnomah Stadium; Portland, OR	W 26–0	13,442	
October 3	No. 6 Ohio State*		California Memorial Stadium; Berkeley, CA	L 19–33	47,000	
October 10	at No. 20 Penn*		Franklin Field; Philadelphia, PA	W 40–0	52,000	
October 17	San Jose State*	No. 16	California Memorial Stadium; Berkeley, CA	W 34–14	39,000	
October 24	No. 11 USC		California Memorial Stadium; Berkeley, CA	L 20–32	78,000	
October 31	at No. 10 UCLA		Los Angeles Memorial Coliseum; Los Angeles, CA (rivalry)	L 7–20	70,073	
November 7	Washington		California Memorial Stadium; Berkeley, CA	W 53–25	36,000	
November 14	Oregon		California Memorial Stadium; Berkeley, CA	T 0–0	24,000	
November 21	at No. 16 Stanford		Stanford Stadium; Stanford, CA (Big Game)	T 21–21	92,500	
*Non-conference game; Rankings from AP Poll released prior to the game; Source:
