= 1953 UCLA Bruins football team =

American college football season

1953 UCLA Bruins football

PCC champion

Rose Bowl, L 20–28 vs. Michigan State
- Conference: Pacific Coast Conference

Ranking
- Coaches: No. 4
- AP: No. 5
- Record: 8–2 (6–1 PCC)
- Head coach: Red Sanders (5th season)
- Offensive scheme: Single-wing
- Home stadium: Los Angeles Memorial Coliseum

1953 Pacific Coast Conference football standings
	Conf.					Overall
Team	W		L		T	W		L		T
No. 5 UCLA $	6	–	1	–	0	8	–	2	–	0
No. 19 Stanford	5	–	1	–	1	6	–	3	–	1
USC	4	–	2	–	1	6	–	3	–	1
California	2	–	2	–	2	4	–	4	–	2
Washington State	3	–	4	–	0	4	–	6	–	0
Oregon State	3	–	5	–	0	3	–	6	–	0
Washington	2	–	4	–	1	3	–	6	–	1
Oregon	2	–	5	–	1	4	–	5	–	1
Idaho	0	–	3	–	0	1	–	8	–	0
$ – Conference champion; Rankings from AP Poll

The 1953 UCLA Bruins football team represented the University of California, Los Angeles (UCLA) in the Pacific Coast Conference (PCC) during the 1953 college football season. Led by fifth-year head coach Red Sanders, the Bruins played their home games at the Los Angeles Memorial Coliseum. The team completed the regular season with an 8–1 record (6–1 in PCC, first) for the first of three consecutive conference titles.

UCLA played in the Rose Bowl but was defeated 28–20 by eighth-ranked Michigan State and finished at 8–2. The Bruins finished fourth in the Coaches Poll and fifth in the AP Poll, both released prior to the bowl games.

== Schedule ==
Date	Opponent	Rank	Site	TV	Result	Attendance	Source
September 18	Oregon State	No. 4	Los Angeles Memorial Coliseum; Los Angeles, CA		W 41–0	39,209	
September 25	Kansas*	No. 4	Los Angeles Memorial Coliseum; Los Angeles, CA		W 19–7	42,829	
October 3	at Oregon	No. 5	Hayward Field; Eugene, OR		W 12–0	24,587	
October 9	Wisconsin*	No. 6	Los Angeles Memorial Coliseum; Los Angeles, CA		W 13–0	69,161	
October 17	at Stanford	No. 4	Stanford Stadium; Stanford, CA		L 20–21	45,000	
October 24	Washington State	No. 12	Los Angeles Memorial Coliseum; Los Angeles, CA		W 44–7	27,608	
October 31	California	No. 10	Los Angeles Memorial Coliseum; Los Angeles, CA (rivalry)		W 20–7	70,073	
November 14	Washington	No. 7	Los Angeles Memorial Coliseum; Los Angeles, CA		W 22–6	13,302	
November 21	at No. 9 USC	No. 5	Los Angeles Memorial Coliseum; Los Angeles, CA (rivalry)		W 13–0	85,366	
January 1, 1954	vs. No. 3 Michigan State	No. 5	Rose Bowl; Pasadena, CA (Rose Bowl)	NBC	L 20–28	100,500	
*Non-conference game; Rankings from AP Poll released prior to the game; Source:

== Game summaries ==
=== USC ===
	1	2	3	4	Total
UCLA	0	7	0	6	13
USC	0	0	0	0	0

By winning this game, the Bruins were the PCC Champions and received the Rose Bowl bid. California assisted with a 21–21 tie with Stanford. Bob Heydenfeldt and Paul Cameron scored in the second and fourth quarter respectively.

=== Michigan State (Rose Bowl) ===
	1	2	3	4	Total
MSU	0	7	14	7	28
UCLA	7	7	0	6	20

This was the first meeting between the two schools. It was the first Rose Bowl appearance for the Spartans. They had previously only played in the 1938 Orange Bowl. It was the third bowl appearance for the Bruins. The weather was sunny. The Spartans wore their green home jerseys and the Bruins wore their white road jerseys.

The Spartans fumbled twice in the first half, which allowed the Bruins the first two scores. Michigan State had only one completed pass and 56 yards in the first half. The Spartans scored a touchdown with 4:45 remaining in the first half.

Victor Postula knocked down four Bruin passes. Coach Biggie Munn instituted a "split line offense" against the Bruins.

The Spartans assembled two long drives in the third quarter to pull ahead 21–-14. The Bruins recovered another Spartan fumble and scored to make the score 21–20. But the extra point kick failed. Billy Wells of Michigan State returned a punt 62 yards for a touchdown with 4:51 left in the game.

==== First quarter scoring ====
- UCLA – Bill Stits 13-yard pass from Paul Cameron. John Hermann converts.

==== Second quarter scoring ====
- UCLA – Cameron, two-yard run. Hermann converts.
- MSU – Ellis Duckett, six-yard blocked punt return. Evan Slonac converts.

==== Third quarter scoring ====
- MSU – LeRoy Bolden, one-yard run. Slonac converts.
- MSU – Billy Wells, two-yard run. Slonac converts.

==== Fourth quarter scoring ====
- UCLA – Rommie Loudd, 28-yard pass from Cameron passes 28 yards to Rommie Loudd. Kick failed.
- MSU – Wells, 62-yard punt return. Slonac converts

== Awards and honors ==
- First Team All Americans – Paul Cameron (H, Consensus selection)
- All Coast/Conference first team – Chuck Doud (T), Jack Ellena (T), Paul Cameron (H)
