= 1953 Rutgers Queensmen football team =

American college football season

1953 Rutgers Queensmen football

Middle Three champion
- Conference: Middle Three Conference
- Record: 2–6 (1–0 Middle Three)
- Head coach: Harvey Harman (12th season)
- Captain: Donald Duncan
- Home stadium: Rutgers Stadium

1953 Middle Three Conference football standings
	Conf.					Overall
Team	W		L		T	W		L		T
Rutgers $	1	–	0	–	0	2	–	6	–	0
Lafayette	1	–	1	–	0	5	–	4	–	0
Lehigh	0	–	1	–	0	4	–	5	–	0
$ – Conference champion

The 1953 Rutgers Queensmen football team represented Rutgers University in the 1953 college football season. In their 12th season under head coach Harvey Harman, the Queensmen compiled a 2–6 record, won the Middle Three Conference championship and were outscored by their opponents 215 to 126.

== Schedule ==
Date	Opponent	Site	Result	Attendance	Source
October 3	VPI*	Rutgers Stadium; Piscataway, NJ	W 20–13	10,000	
October 10	at Princeton*	Palmer Stadium; Princeton, NJ (rivalry)	L 7–9	25,000	
October 17	Brown*	Rutgers Stadium; Piscataway, NJ	L 20–27	7,500	
October 24	Fordham*	Rutgers Stadium; Piscataway, NJ	L 13–40	9,000	
October 31	Colgate*	Rutgers Stadium; Piscataway, NJ	L 12–33	7,500	
November 7	at Lafayette	Fisher Field; Easton, PA	W 14–13	4,000	
November 14	Penn State*	Rutgers Stadium; Piscataway, NJ	L 26–54	9,500	
November 21	at Columbia*	Baker Field; New York, NY	L 13–27	12,000	
*Non-conference game
