= Febel =

Febel is the surname of the following people:

- Fritz Febel (1909–1969), German-American football player and coach
- Reinhard Febel (born 1952), German composer
