= Larry Leckonby =

Current position
- Title: Athletic director
- Team: Catawba
- Conference: SAC

Biographical details
- Born: c. 1957
- Education: Duke (1979)

Administrative career (AD unless noted)
- 1981–1982: UMass (assistant)
- 1982–1988: Boston University (bus. mgr.)
- 1988–1993: Old Dominion (assistant AD)
- 1993–1998: Boston College (associate AD)
- 1998–2002: Houston (sr. associate AD)
- 2002–2008: Maryland (sr. associate AD)
- 2008–2014: The Citadel
- 2014–present: Catawba

Larry Leckonby is a college sports administrator, currently serving as athletic director at Catawba College. He has previously served as an assistant athletic director at the University of Massachusetts Amherst, Boston University, Old Dominion University, and Boston College. He served as senior associate athletic director at the University of Houston prior to serving as senior associate athletic director at the University of Maryland, College Park, working as the chief financial officer of that school's athletic department. He was athletic director at The Citadel from 2008 through 2014. Leckonby's tenure at The Citadel ended in the summer of 2014, when he accepted the same position at Catawba.

Leckonby's father, William Leckonby was a football coach and director of athletics at Lehigh University.

Leckonby inherited a $1.4 million deficit when he took the job, and in two years reduced the subsidy required to support The Citadel athletic department by more than $1 million.
