= 1953 Westminster Titans football team =

American college football season

1953 Westminster Titans football
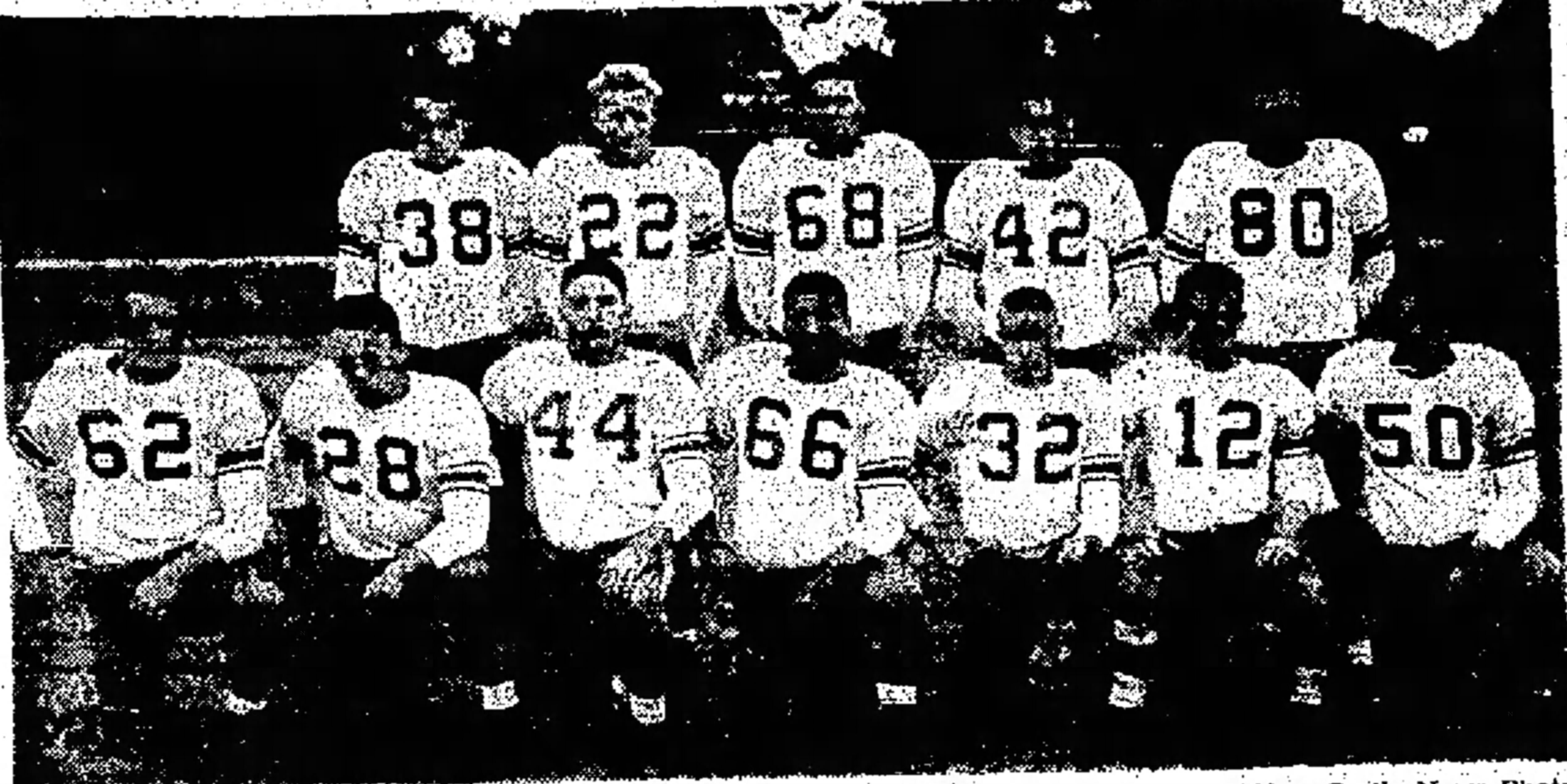
- Conference: Independent
- Record: 8–0
- Head coach: Harold Burry (2nd season)
- Home stadium: Memorial Field

1953 Eastern college football independents records
	Conf.			Overall
Team	W	L	T	W		L		T
Westminster (PA)		–		8	–	0	–	0
Juniata		–		7	–	0	–	0
No. 14 Army		–		7	–	1	–	1
Franklin & Marshall		–		5	–	2	–	0
Hofstra		–		6	–	3	–	0
Penn State		–		6	–	3	–	0
Carnegie Tech		–		5	–	3	–	0
Boston College		–		5	–	3	–	1
Boston University		–		5	–	3	–	1
Syracuse		–		5	–	3	–	1
Tufts		–		4	–	3	–	0
Holy Cross		–		5	–	5	–	0
Temple		–		4	–	4	–	1
Colgate		–		3	–	4	–	2
Fordham		–		4	–	5	–	0
Villanova		–		4	–	6	–	0
Drexel		–		2	–	3	–	1
Pittsburgh		–		3	–	5	–	1
Buffalo		–		1	–	5	–	1
Bucknell		–		1	–	8	–	0
Rankings from AP Poll

The 1953 Westminster Titans football team was an American football team that represented Westminster College as an independent during the 1953 college football season. In their second season under head coach Harold Burry, the Titans compiled a perfect 8–0 record, shut out four opponents, and outscored all opponents by a total of 143 to 33.

On offense, the Titans tallied 2,474 yards (1,486 rushing, 862 passing). On defense, they held opponents to 1,022 yards (524 rushing, 498 passing). Quarterback Harold Davis led the team with 741 passing yards, 10 touchdown passes, and 11 interceptions. Davis also tallied 150 rushing yards for 891 yards of total offense. White was the team's leading rusher and scorer with 424 yards and 30 points scored.

Three Westmminster players were named to the All-District Class B football team: Jesse James at tackle; Ralph Veights at guard; and Roy Eckstrom at center. Harold Davis was named to the second team. Eckstrom was also selected by the Associated Press as the first-team center on the 1953 all-Pennsylvania football team.

1953 was Westminster's first undefeated season since the school began playing football in 1892. Additional undefeated seasons followed under Burry's leadership in 1956, 1964, and 1970. Burry was inducted into the College Football Hall of Fame in 1996.

The team played its home games at Westminster College's Memorial Field in New Wilmington, Pennsylvania.

== Schedule ==
Date	Opponent	Site	Result	Attendance	Source
September 26	Carnegie Tech	Memorial Field; New Wilmington, PA	W 6–0	3,000	
October 3	at Thiel	Greenville, PA	W 32–7		
October 10	Bethany (WV)^{†}	Memorial Field; New Wilmington, PA	W 32–6		
October 17	at Grove City	Grove City, PA	W 20–14		
October 24	at Geneva	Beaver Falls, PA	W 8–0	3,000	
October 31	at Waynesburg	Waynesburg, PA	W 20–0		
November 7	Allegheny	Memorial Field; New Wilmington, PA	W 12–0		
November 14	Slippery Rock	Memorial Field; New Wilmington, PA	W 13–6	5,000	
^{†}Homecoming
