= 1953 Fordham Rams football team =

American college football season

1953 Fordham Rams football
- Conference: Independent
- Record: 4–5
- Head coach: Ed Danowski (8th season)
- Home stadium: Polo Grounds

1953 Eastern college football independents records
| | Conf. | | | Overall |
| Team | W | L | T | W | | L | | T |
|---|---|---|---|---|---|---|---|---|
| Westminster (PA) | | – | | 8 | – | 0 | – | 0 |
| Juniata | | – | | 7 | – | 0 | – | 0 |
| No. 14 Army | | – | | 7 | – | 1 | – | 1 |
| Franklin & Marshall | | – | | 5 | – | 2 | – | 0 |
| Hofstra | | – | | 6 | – | 3 | – | 0 |
| Penn State | | – | | 6 | – | 3 | – | 0 |
| Carnegie Tech | | – | | 5 | – | 3 | – | 0 |
| Boston College | | – | | 5 | – | 3 | – | 1 |
| Boston University | | – | | 5 | – | 3 | – | 1 |
| Syracuse | | – | | 5 | – | 3 | – | 1 |
| Tufts | | – | | 4 | – | 3 | – | 0 |
| Holy Cross | | – | | 5 | – | 5 | – | 0 |
| Temple | | – | | 4 | – | 4 | – | 1 |
| Colgate | | – | | 3 | – | 4 | – | 2 |
| Fordham | | – | | 4 | – | 5 | – | 0 |
| Villanova | | – | | 4 | – | 6 | – | 0 |
| Drexel | | – | | 2 | – | 3 | – | 1 |
| Pittsburgh | | – | | 3 | – | 5 | – | 1 |
| Buffalo | | – | | 1 | – | 5 | – | 1 |
| Bucknell | | – | | 1 | – | 8 | – | 0 |
Rankings from AP Poll

The 1953 Fordham Rams football team represented Fordham University as an independent during the 1953 college football season. The Rams went 4–5 and amassed 176 points while their defense allowed 128 points.

== Schedule ==
| Date | Opponent | Site | Result | Attendance | Source |
|---|---|---|---|---|---|
| October 2 | at Detroit | University of Detroit Stadium; Detroit, MI | W 21–7 | 14,900 | |
| October 10 | at Syracuse | Archbold Stadium; Syracuse, NY | L 13–20 | 20,000 | |
| October 16 | Boston College | Polo Grounds; New York, NY | L 13–20 | 20,760 | |
| October 24 | at Rutgers | Rutgers Stadium; Piscataway, NJ | W 40–13 | 9,000 | |
| October 31 | Miami (FL) | Polo Grounds; New York, NY | W 20–0 | 20,308 | |
| November 7 | at Penn State | New Beaver Field; State College, PA | L 21–28 | 15,000 | |
| November 14 | Temple | Polo Grounds; New York, NY | W 28–0 | 7,919 | |
| November 21 | at Holy Cross | Fitton Field; Worcester, MA | L 7–20 | 12,000 | |
| November 28 | Villanova | Polo Grounds; New York, NY | L 13–20 | 15,330 | |
