= 1953 Penn State Nittany Lions football team =

American college football season

1953 Penn State Nittany Lions football
- Conference: Independent
- Record: 6–3
- Head coach: Rip Engle (4th season)
- Captains: Don Malinak; Tony Rados
- Home stadium: New Beaver Field

1953 Eastern college football independents records
	Conf.			Overall
Team	W	L	T	W		L		T
Westminster (PA)		–		8	–	0	–	0
Juniata		–		7	–	0	–	0
No. 14 Army		–		7	–	1	–	1
Franklin & Marshall		–		5	–	2	–	0
Hofstra		–		6	–	3	–	0
Penn State		–		6	–	3	–	0
Carnegie Tech		–		5	–	3	–	0
Boston College		–		5	–	3	–	1
Boston University		–		5	–	3	–	1
Syracuse		–		5	–	3	–	1
Tufts		–		4	–	3	–	0
Holy Cross		–		5	–	5	–	0
Temple		–		4	–	4	–	1
Colgate		–		3	–	4	–	2
Fordham		–		4	–	5	–	0
Villanova		–		4	–	6	–	0
Drexel		–		2	–	3	–	1
Pittsburgh		–		3	–	5	–	1
Buffalo		–		1	–	5	–	1
Bucknell		–		1	–	8	–	0
Rankings from AP Poll

The 1953 Penn State Nittany Lions football team represented the Pennsylvania State University as an independent during the 1953 college football season. The team was coached by Rip Engle and played its home games in New Beaver Field in University Park, Pennsylvania.

== Schedule ==
Date	Opponent	Site	Result	Attendance	Source
September 26	at Wisconsin	Camp Randall Stadium; Madison, WI	L 0–20	48,374	
October 3	at Penn	Franklin Field; Philadelphia, PA	L 7–13	51,000	
October 10	at Boston University	Braves Field; Boston, MA	W 35–13	12,338	
October 17	Syracuse	New Beaver Field; University Park, PA (rivalry)	W 20–14	20,712	
October 24	TCU^{†}	New Beaver Field; University Park, PA	W 27–21	27,966	
October 31	West Virginia	New Beaver Field; University Park, PA (rivalry)	L 19–20	24,670	
November 7	Fordham	New Beaver Field; University Park, PA	W 28–21	13,897	
November 14	at Rutgers	Rutgers Stadium; Piscataway, NJ	W 54–26	9,500	
November 21	at Pittsburgh	Pitt Stadium; Pittsburgh, PA (rivalry)	W 17–0	39,642	
^{†}Homecoming
