= 1953 Pittsburgh Panthers football team =

American college football season

1953 Pittsburgh Panthers football
- Conference: Independent
- Record: 3–5–1
- Head coach: Red Dawson (2nd season)
- Home stadium: Pitt Stadium

1953 Eastern college football independents records
	Conf.			Overall
Team	W	L	T	W		L		T
Westminster (PA)		–		8	–	0	–	0
Juniata		–		7	–	0	–	0
No. 14 Army		–		7	–	1	–	1
Franklin & Marshall		–		5	–	2	–	0
Hofstra		–		6	–	3	–	0
Penn State		–		6	–	3	–	0
Carnegie Tech		–		5	–	3	–	0
Boston College		–		5	–	3	–	1
Boston University		–		5	–	3	–	1
Syracuse		–		5	–	3	–	1
Tufts		–		4	–	3	–	0
Holy Cross		–		5	–	5	–	0
Temple		–		4	–	4	–	1
Colgate		–		3	–	4	–	2
Fordham		–		4	–	5	–	0
Villanova		–		4	–	6	–	0
Drexel		–		2	–	3	–	1
Pittsburgh		–		3	–	5	–	1
Buffalo		–		1	–	5	–	1
Bucknell		–		1	–	8	–	0
Rankings from AP Poll

The 1953 Pittsburgh Panthers football team represented the University of Pittsburgh as an independent during the 1953 college football season. The team compiled a 3–5–1 record under head coach Red Dawson.

== Schedule ==
Date	Opponent	Rank	Site	Result	Attendance	Source
September 26	No. 16 West Virginia	No. 17	Pitt Stadium; Pittsburgh, PA (Backyard Brawl)	L 7–17	41,980	
October 3	No. 8 Oklahoma		Pitt Stadium; Pittsburgh, PA	T 7–7	28,152	
October 10	Nebraska	No. 17	Pitt Stadium; Pittsburgh, PA	W 14–6	19,755	
October 17	at No. 1 Notre Dame	No. 15	Notre Dame Stadium; Notre Dame, IN (rivalry)	L 14–23	57,998	
October 24	at Northwestern	No. 18	Dyche Stadium; Evanston, IL	L 21–27	23,008	
October 31	at No. 14 Minnesota		Memorial Stadium; Minneapolis, MN	L 14–35	49,092	
November 7	at Virginia		Scott Stadium; Charlottesville, VA	W 26–0	7,709	
November 14	NC State		Pitt Stadium; Pittsburgh, PA	W 40–6	15,729	
November 21	Penn State		Pitt Stadium; Pittsburgh, PA (rivalry)	L 0–17	39,642	
Rankings from AP Poll released prior to the game

== Preseason ==
For the first year since 1949, there was no chaos in the Panthers coaching staff during the off-season, as Red Dawson returned to coach the Pitt Panthers. Spring practice opened on April 7 and ran for 20 sessions. Over 50 aspirants tried out for the squad. On May 9, the final scrimmage was an alumni versus varsity game, which began the Spring Festival Week. In front of a crowd of 2,392, the varsity prevailed 20–13.

The Panthers fall pre-season training was held in Pittsburgh on the Ellsworth Center field. 50 players were invited to participate on September 1. Coach Dawson's roster had 25 returning lettermen, 20 sophomores from the unbeaten freshman team and 5 returning non-lettermen. The squad participated in two-a-day practice sessions until school started on September 21. On September 11, Pitt and Rutgers met for a scrimmage at Ligonier High School Field. The Panthers scored seven touchdowns and held Rutgers scoreless.

The Pittsburgh Railways offered bus service from the main campus to the stadium for 10 cents on home game-days.

Coach Dawson's recruiting class of freshmen was notable. The class was led by Joe Walton and included Charles Brueckman, Bob Rosborough, Corky Cost, Corny Salvaterra, Dick Scherer, Dale Brown, Herman Canil, Vincent Scorsone, Bob Pollock, James Lenhart, Darrell Lewis, Nick Passodelis, Ambrose Bagamery, Ralph Ciper and Dan Wisnewski, all of whom lettered and helped lead the Panthers to back-to-back bowl games in 1955 and 1956.

== Game summaries ==
=== West Virginia ===
Week 1: West Virginia at Pitt

Team	1	2	3	4	Total
• West Virginia	7	0	3	7	17
Pitt	0	7	0	0	7

- Date: September 26, 1953
- Location: Pitt Stadium
  Pittsburgh, PA
- Game start: 1:30 p.m.
- Game attendance: 41,980
- Game weather: cloudy and warm
- Referee: John H. Coles (Westminster)

Scoring summary
1	WVU	Fred Wyant 1-yard quarterback sneak (Jack Stone kick)	WVU 7–0
2	PITT	Joe Capp 4-yard run (Gene Steratore kick)	WVU 7–Pitt 7
3	WVU	Stone 15-yard field goal	WVU 10–7
4	WVU	Joe Marconi 10-yard run ( Stone kick)	WVU 17–0

The Panthers opened the 1953 season with the annual Backyard Brawl against West Virginia. Pitt led the series 34–10–1. Mountaineers Coach Art Lewis had basically the same team that shut out the Panthers 16–0 in 1952. Quarterback Fred Wyant, who scored one touchdown and passed for the second in last year's meeting, again directed the offense. Future pro football star Joe Marconi was switched from defense to offensive halfback.

Pitt starting tackle Lou Palatella broke his leg in practice and was lost for the season. He was replaced by William Schmitt. Coach Dawson reworked the backfield by replacing returning quarterback Rudy Mattioli, with last year's left halfback, Bob Hoffman. Former defensive backs Richie McCabe and Chester Rice were named starting halfbacks and Bobby Epps was the fullback.

In front of 43,446 fans, West Virginia beat the Panthers 17–7. Mountaineers quarterback Fred Wyant and fullback Joe Marconi scored the touchdowns, while Joe Stone was good on both placements and on a 15-yard field goal. Pitt scored in the second quarter to tie the game at seven. After gaining possession on their 37-yard line, the second string backfield (Henry Ford, Ray DiPasquale, Gene Steratore and Joe Capp) moved the ball to the 4-yard line, and Capp ran through right tackle for the score. Steratore added the placement. Pitt gained 13 first downs to West Virginia's 14, but Pitt only gained 195 yards versus the Mountaineers 286. Pitt completed only 1 of 13 passes. The Mountaineers had not won two straight in the series since 1922-23.

The Pitt starting lineup for the game against West Virginia was Joe Zombek (left end), William Schmitt (left tackle), Harold Hunter (left guard), Ed Bose (center), Rudy Grunder (right guard), Eldred Kraemer (right tackle), Dick Deitrick (right end), Bill Hoffman (quarterback), Chester Rice (left halfback), Richie McCabe (right halfback) and Bobby Epps (fullback). Substitutes appearing in the game for Pitt were Bob McQuaide, John Paluck, William Cessar, Howard Linn, Paul Blanda, John Cenci, Bob Ballock, Gary LeDonne, Henry Ford, Gene Steratore, Joe Capp, Rudy Mattioli, Ray DiPasquale and John Jacobs.

=== Oklahoma ===
Week 2: Oklahoma at Pitt

Team	1	2	3	4	Total
Oklahoma	0	7	0	0	7
Pitt	0	0	0	7	7

- Date: October 3, 1953
- Location: Pitt Stadium
  Pittsburgh, PA
- Game start: 1:30 p.m.
- Game attendance: 28,152
- Game weather: fair and mild
- Referee: David Kaufman (Johns Hopkins)

Scoring summary
2	OKLA	Larry Grigg 80-yard pass from Buddy Leake ( Leake kick)	OKLA 7–0
4	PITT	Pete Neft 1-yard run ( Paul Blanda kick )	PITT 7–OKLA 7

On October 3, the #8-ranked Oklahoma Sooners came to Pittsburgh for the first time. Bud Wilkinson's Sooners were 0–1 for the season, having lost to Notre Dame (28–21). Sooner guard J. D. Roberts was a consensus All-American, Outland Trophy winner and UPI Lineman of the Year for 1953.

The Panthers were healthy, and Coach Dawson tweaked the starting lineup for the Sooners. William Cessar replaced William Schmitt at tackle; Ed Johnson replaced Bob Ballock at center; John Cenci replaced Rudy Grunder at guard; Henry Ford replaced Bob Hoffman at quarterback and Ray Dipasquale replaced Chester Rice at halfback.

The 10 point underdog Panthers outplayed the Sooners, but only managed a 7–7 tie. Pitt ran 80 plays, earned 19 first downs and gained 277 total yards, while holding Oklahoma to 44 plays, 9 first downs and 170 total yards. Oklahoma scored in the second quarter on an 80-yard pass play from Buddy Leake to Larry Grigg. Leake added the extra point. The Panthers were in Oklahoma territory on every possession of the first half but could not score. They punted 4 times, fumbled once and were held on downs twice. Pitt fumbled early in the second half on their 7-yard line and held on downs. The Panthers offense drove 89 yards but stalled on the 1-yard line. The defense held and regained possession on the Oklahoma 49-yard line. Pitt's touchdown came on a 1-yard quarterback sneak by Pete Neft, capping a 15-play drive. Paul Blanda's placement tied the game. Bobby Epps led the Pitt rushers with 73 yards. Henry Ford completed 8 of 15 passes for 76 yards, and Dick Deitrick caught 4 of them for 61 yards.

The Pitt starting lineup for the game against Oklahoma was Joe Zombek (left end), William Cessar (left tackle), Harold Hunter (left guard), Ed Johnson (center), John Cenci (right guard), Eldred Kraemer (right tackle), Dick Deitrick (right end), Henry Ford (quarterback), Ray DiPasquale (left halfback), Richie McCabe (right halfback) and Bobby Epps (fullback). Substitutes appearing in the game for Pitt were Bob McQuaide, John Paluck, William Schmitt, Howard Linn, Dick Gatz, Glen Tunning, Ed Stowe, Joe Los, Bob Ballock, Pete Neft, Ray Ferguson, Joe Capp, Rudy Mattioli, Paul Blanda and John Jacobs.

=== Nebraska ===
Week 3: Nebraska at Pitt

Team	1	2	3	4	Total
Nebraska	0	0	6	0	6
• Pitt	7	0	0	7	14

- Date: October 10, 1953
- Location: Pitt Stadium
  Pittsburgh, PA
- Game start: 1:30 p.m.
- Game attendance: 19,755
- Game weather: sunny and mild
- Referee: William T. Holleran

Scoring summary
1	PITT	Bobby Epps 1-yard sneak (Paul Blanda kick)	PITT 7–0
3	NEBR	Johnny Bordogna 1-yard run (Bordogna kick failed)	PITT 7–6
4	PITT	Henry Ford 1-yard run (Blanda kick)	PITT 14–6

On October 10, after an absence of 11 years on the Pitt schedule, the Nebraska Cornhuskers returned to Pitt Stadium as the Panthers Homecoming opponent. The Panthers led the all-time series 11–3–3. Former Panthers All-American guard Bill Glassford was in his fifth year as coach of the Huskers, and his line coach was former Pitt lineman and ex-head coach Mike Milligan. Nebraska had an 0–2–1 record, having lost to Oregon and Kansas State and tying Illinois.

Pitt with their 0–1–1 record was ranked #17 and favored by 13 points. Coach Dawson kept the lineup intact except for returning a healthy Rudy Grunder back at right guard.

Jock Sutherland was honored at halftime with a plaque commemorating his selection to the College Football Hall of Fame. Admiral William F. Halsey presented the award to Jock's sisters and brother (Louisa, Marion and William). Seventeen former Pitt All-Americans and over 50 former lettermen were on the field for the presentation ceremonies.

A Homecoming Day crowd of 20,666 watched the Panthers manage to eke out a 14–6 victory over the Cornhuskers. Pitt scored on its opening possession by going 66 yards in 12 plays. Fullback Bobby Epps scored from the 1-yard line and Paul Blanda added the extra point. Pitt recovered 5 Husker fumbles and Nebraska countered by intercepting 3 Pitt passes. Late in the third quarter, Nebraska intercepted an errant Henry Ford pass and gained possession on the Panthers 43-yard line. A nine-play drive ended with a 1-yard touchdown by Johnny Bordogna. Bordogna's placement was low and Pitt led 7–6. The Huskers later drove to the Panthers 14-yard line, but the Panthers defense held. The Pitt offense ran an 86-yard, 18-play drive with Henry Ford plunging into the end zone as time expired for the touchdown. Blanda kicked the point after and Pitt was 1–1–1 for the season.

The Panthers gained 212 yards rushing. Bobby Epps gained 87 yards on 17 carries and Richie McCabe added 53 yards on 13 carries. The Panthers only threw 7 passes. They completed three, had three intercepted and dropped 1.

The Pitt starting lineup for the game against Nebraska was Joe Zombek (left end), William Cessar (left tackle), Harold Hunter (left guard), Ed Johnson (center), Rudy Grunder (right guard), Eldred Kraemer (right tackle), Dick Deitrick (right end), Henry Ford (quarterback), Ray DiPasquale (left halfback), Richie McCabe (right halfback) and Bobby Epps (fullback). Substitutes appearing in the game for Pitt were Bob McQuaide, Fred Glatz, William Schmitt, Howard Linn, John Cenci, Ed Stowe, Joe Los, Bob Ballock, Pete Neft, Ray Ferguson, Joe Capp, Dick Manson and Paul Blanda.

=== at Notre Dame ===
Week 4: Pitt at Notre Dame

Team	1	2	3	4	Total
Pitt	7	7	0	0	14
• Notre Dame	0	7	9	7	23

- Date: October 17, 1953
- Location: Notre Dame Stadium
  Notre Dame, IN
- Game start: 1:30 p.m.
- Game attendance: 56,042
- Game weather: partly cloudy and warm
- Referee: A. T. Skover (Detroit)

Scoring summary
1	PITT	Bobby Epps 8-yard run (Paul Blanda kick)	PITT 7–0
2	ND	Neil Worden 2-yard run ( Menil Mavraides kick)	PITT 7–ND 7
2	PITT	Richie McCabe 2-yard end run (Blanda kick)	PITT 14–7
3	ND	Frank Varrichione tackled Bobby Epps in the end zone for a safety	PITT 14–9
3	ND	Ralph Guglielmi 1-yard quarterback sneak (Mavraides kick)	ND 16–14
4	ND	Guglielmi 8-yard run (Mavraides kick)	ND 23–14

On October 17, the #15 Pitt Panthers traveled to South Bend, IN to play #1 Notre Dame Fighting Irish for their first of four straight road trips. The Irish led the all-time series 13–6–1, but Pitt upset the Irish 22–19 in 1952. The Irish were led by three All-Americans: halfback Johnny Lattner (1953 Heisman Trophy winner), tackle Art Hunter and end Don Penza. Frank Leahy's Irish were 2–0 on the season and favored by 19 points in their home opener.

On Friday, Coach Dawson and 39 squad members flew on a chartered Capital airliner to Elkhart, IN. The Panthers held a workout at Notre Dame Stadium in the afternoon. John Cenci replaced the injured Rudy Grunder at right guard in the Panthers starting lineup.

In front of 57,998 fans, the Pitt Panthers led the #1 Fighting Irish at the end of the first half 14–7. The Panther offense was unable to advance into Notre Dame territory in the second half, while the Irish scored two touchdowns and a safety to beat the Panthers 23–14. Pitt scored on their first possession by going 66 yards in 9 running plays with Bobby Epps going off tackle from the 8-yard line for the touchdown. Paul Blanda added the extra point. Notre Dame answered early in the second period with a 13-play 70-yard drive. Fullback Neil Worden ran the final 2 yards for the score. Menil Mavraides added the placement. After Notre Dame regained possession, quarterback Ralph Guglielmi completed a pass to end Paul Matz, but Pitt defensive back Henry Ford stole the ball and raced to the Notre Dame 7-yard line. An offsides penalty moved the ball to the 2-yard line. Halfback Richie McCabe went around end for the score. Blanda booted the placement. Notre Dame wasted no time to assert its power in the third quarter, as they tackled Epps in the end zone for a safety on Pitt's first possession. Then the Irish recovered a Ford fumble on the Panther 24-yd line. On the fourth play Guglielmi scored from the 1-yard line. Notre Dame added the final touchdown late on an 8-yard scamper by Guglielmi. Mavraides placement ended the scoring.

The Pitt starting lineup for the game against Notre Dame was Joe Zombek (left end), William Cessar (left tackle), Harold Hunter (left guard), Ed Johnson (center), John Cenci (right guard), Eldred Kraemer (right tackle), Dick Deitrick (right end), Henry Ford (quarterback), Ray DiPasquale (left halfback), Richie McCabe (right halfback) and Bobby Epps (fullback). Substitutes appearing in the game for Pitt were Bob McQuaide, Dick Gatz, William Schmitt, Howard Linn, Ed Stowe, Joe Los, Bob Ballock, Pete Neft, Ray Ferguson, Joe Capp, Dick Manson, Ed Bose, John Paluck, Fred Glatz, Rudy Mattioli, John Jacobs and Paul Blanda.

=== at Northwestern ===
Week 5: Pitt at Northwestern

Team	1	2	3	4	Total
Pitt	7	7	7	0	21
• Northwestern	7	13	0	7	27

- Date: October 24, 1953
- Location: Dyche Stadium
  Evanston, IL
- Game start: 1:30 p.m.
- Game attendance: 23,008
- Game weather: partly cloudy and chilly
- Referee: Ross Dean

Scoring summary
1	NU	Nick Chandler 10-yard run (John Damore kick)	NU 7–0
1	PITT	Henry Ford 1-yard run ( Paul Blanda kick)	TIE 7– 7
2	NU	Bob Lauter 5-yard end run (Damore kick)	NU 14–7
2	NU	Lauter 8-yard pass from Dick Thomas (kick missed)	NU 20–7
2	PITT	Richie McCabe 53-yard interception return (Blanda kick)	NU 20–14
3	PITT	Joe Zombek 2-yard pass from Henry Ford (Blanda kick)	PITT 21–20
4	NU	Wayne Glassman 2-yard run ( Damore kick)	NU 27–21

The second road game was against the Northwestern Wildcats at Evanston, IL. Coach Bob Voigts' Wildcats were 2–2 for season. They were led by quarterback Dick Thomas (third ranked college passer) and All-American end Joe Collier, who set Big Ten records for touchdown receptions (7) and receiving yards (650) in 1952.

This was the Panthers' third trip to Evanston, and the series was tied 1–1. Coach Dawson elevated sophomore Ed Stowe to starting guard, replaced Bill Cessar at left tackle with Dick Gatz and reinserted John Jacobs and Ray Ferguson in the starting halfback positions. The game was rated a toss-up by the oddsmakers. Coach Dawson told the Sun-Telegraph: “This is the ideal spot to be relaxed but determined as hell. We're relaxed. I don't know whether we're determined.”

In front of 28,000 fans, the Pitt Panthers handed the Northwestern Wildcats a 27–21 victory. The Panthers opened the game by being assessed a 15-yard penalty for being late for the kick-off. They then proceeded to fumble 5 times, losing three, and throwing three interceptions. Pitt halfback John Jacobs fumbled the opening kick-off, but the Panthers recovered. On third down he fumbled again and Northwestern recovered on the Pitt 20-yard line. The Wildcats scored in 5 plays and John Damore added the extra point for a 7–0 lead. Pitt answered with an 88-yard drive directed by quarterback Henry Ford. He ran in from the 1-yard line after returning the kick-off 24 yards, completing a pass to midfield and running 47-yards to the 3. Paul Blanda's placement tied the score. On their next possession the Panthers advanced the ball to the Wildcat 8-yard line, but lost the ball on downs after a 15-yard penalty. Northwestern went 81 yards for the go-ahead touchdown on a Bob Lauter 5-yard end run, and Damore added his second placement. Then the Panthers fumbled and Northwestern recovered on their own 45-yard line. Five plays later Lauter scored on an 8-yard touchdown reception from Dick Thomas. Tom Callaway's placement was blocked by Joe Zombek. In the final minutes of the half on three consecutive plays there were three turnovers (2 interceptions and one fumble). On the final interception Pitt halfback Richie McCabe raced 54-yards for a touchdown. Blanda converted and Pitt trailed 20–14 at the half. After a third quarter interception, Pitt went ahead 21–20 on a 2–yard pass from Ford to Zombek and another Blanda extra point. With less than 6 minutes remaining Nick Chandler intercepted Pitt quarterback Pete Neft's pass at the Wildcat 32-yard line. Northwestern drove to the Pitt 26-yard line in 5 plays. Then the Panthers were called for pass interference on the 2-yard line. Wayne Glassman scored the touchdown and Damore converted.

The Pitt starting lineup for the game against Northwestern was Joe Zombek (left end), William Cessar (left tackle), Ed Stowe (left guard), Ed Johnson (center), John Cenci (right guard), Eldred Kraemer (right tackle), Dick Deitrick (right end), Henry Ford (quarterback), John Jacobs (left halfback), Ray Ferguson (right halfback) and Bobby Epps (fullback). Substitutes appearing in the game for Pitt were Bob McQuaide, Dick Gatz, Harold Hunter, Joe Los, Pete Neft, Richie McCabe, John Paluck, Fred Glatz, Rudy Mattioli, Ray DiPasquale and Paul Blanda.

=== at Minnesota ===
Week 6: Pitt at Minnesota

Team	1	2	3	4	Total
Pitt	0	7	0	7	14
• Minnesota	0	13	7	15	35

- Date: October 31, 1953
- Location: Memorial Stadium (University of Minnesota)
  Minneapolis, MN
- Game start: 1:30 p.m.
- Game attendance: 49,092
- Game weather: sunny and mild
- Referee: Rollie Barnum

Scoring summary
2	MINN	Paul Giel 2-yard run (Geno Cappelletti kick)	MINN 7–0
2	PITT	Bobby Epps 2-yard run ( Paul Blanda kick)	TIE 7– 7
2	MINN	Giel 2-yard run (Cappelletti kick blocked)	MINN 13–7
3	MINN	Giel 25-yard run (Cappelletti kick)	MINN 20–7
4	MINN	Dale Quist 2-yard run (Cappelletti kick)	MINN 27–7
4	MINN	Frank Rog tackled Henry Ford in the end zone for a safety	MINN 29–7
4	MINN	Quist 4-yard run (Max Schmitt kick missed)	MINN 35–7
4	PITT	Joe Zombek 4-yard pass from Ford (Blanda kick)	MINN 35–14

On October 31, the Panthers traveled to Minneapolis, MN to play the Minnesota Golden Gophers. This was the “NCAA Game of the Week” on television. The all-time series was 6–0 in favor of Minnesota, and the Panthers had been outscored 162–24. Ex-Pitt coach Wes Fesler was in his third year at Minnesota. His #14-ranked Gophers were 2–3, and were led by the 1953 UPI College Football Player of the Year Paul Giel.

Coach Dawson was hopeful: “We just haven't been able to get over the hump. We've come close and I think we played better against Northwestern than against Army in winning a year ago following the Notre Dame game. Our best ball of the year was played in the second-half last week. We had a little let-down at the start, and Northwestern spread its defense all over the field which threw our kids off for awhile, but once we got going we did fairly well.”

In front of 50,965 fans, the Gophers extended their win streak over the Panthers to 7–0 with a 35–14 victory. After a scoreless first period, Paul Giel returned a Pitt punt 65 yards to the Panthers 5-yard line. He ran in from the 2-yard line on third down. Geno Capelletti converted the first of his 3 extra points. The Panthers answered with a 67-yard drive. Henry Ford returned the kick-off to the 33-yard line. Bobby Epps ran the ball over right guard from 2 yards out for the score. Paul Blanda's placement tied the score. The Panthers did not score again until late in the game against the Gophers substitutes. Joe Zombek caught a 4 yard touchdown pass from Ford and Blanda added the point after. Meanwhile the fans were entertained by the Paul Giel show. He ran for 3 touchdowns; gained 72 yards rushing on 19 carries; completed 6 of 12 passes for 96 yards; returned 2 punts for 84 yards; intercepted a pass and averaged 35 yards on 4 punts. In the middle of the third period he was replaced by Dale Quist, who scored 2 touchdowns. Pitt quarterback Henry Ford ran 7 times for 57 yards; returned 3 kick-offs for 81 yards; completed 4 of 13 passes for 33 yards and had 1 intercepted.

The Pitt starting lineup for the game against Minnesota was Joe Zombek (left end), Dick Gatz (left tackle), Ed Stowe (left guard), Ed Johnson (center), John Cenci (right guard), Eldred Kraemer (right tackle), Dick Deitrick (right end), Henry Ford (quarterback), John Jacobs (left halfback), Richie McCabe (right halfback) and Bobby Epps (fullback). Substitutes appearing in the game for Pitt were Bob McQuaide, Bill Adams, William Schmitt, Harold Hunter, Joe Los, Pete Neft, Ray Ferguson, John Paluck, Fred Glatz, Rudy Mattioli, Joe Capp, Gene Steratore, Dick Manson, Howard Linn, Glen Tunning, Bob Ballock, Ed Bose, Al Bolkovac and Paul Blanda.

=== at Virginia ===
Week 7: Pitt at Virginia

Team	1	2	3	4	Total
• Pitt	7	6	7	6	26
Virginia	0	0	0	0	0

- Date: November 7, 1953
- Location: Scott Stadium
  Charlottesville, VA
- Game start: 1:30 p.m.
- Game attendance: 7,709
- Game weather: clear and cold
- Referee: Orell J. Mitchell

Scoring summary
1	PITT	Bobby Epps 13-yard run around right end (Paul Blanda kick)	PITT 7–0
2	PITT	Henry Ford 1-yard quarterback sneak ( Blanda kick missed)	PITT 13– 0
3	PITT	Ray Ferguson 2-yard run (Blanda kick)	PITT 20–0
4	PITT	Glen Dillon 3-yard pass from Ford (Gene Steratore kick missed)	PITT 26–0

The final road game was to Charlottesville, VA to play the Virginia Cavaliers for the first time. The Panthers arrived and were greeted with a foot of fallen snow when they arrived. The Sun-Telegraph reported that “there was no tarpaulin on the Scott Stadium turf because there was none available. As the University officials explained, they 'never have any use for one'.” Coach Dawson elevated guard Hal Hunter, center Ed Bose and halfback Ray Ferguson to the starting line-up.

First-year coach Ned McDonald's squad was 1–5 on the season. Virginia had not won at home and Pitt was winless on the road. Coach McDonald's best lineman, tackle Joe Mehalick, was out for the game with a knee injury.

The Panthers broke their losing streak with a 26–0 shutout of the Cavaliers. Pitt dominated defensively and their offense scored in every quarter. Fullback Bobby Epps capped the opening drive with a 13-yard run around end for the first touchdown. In the second period, Epps recovered a Cavaliers fumble on their 49-yard line. A 1-yard quarterback sneak by Henry Ford increased the Panthers lead to 13–0 at halftime. The third quarter score came after a 10-play, 42-yard drive on a 2-yard run by Ray Ferguson. The final touchdown was a 3-yard jump pass from Ford to Glen Dillon. Paul Blanda converted 2 extra points. Pitt earned 19 first downs and gained 309 total yards versus 3 first downs and 43 total yards for the Cavaliers. Ford completed 7 of 12 passes for 78 yards. On the ground; Epps rushed for 65 yards on 11 carries; Dick Manson gained 57 yards on 11 carries; and Ferguson gained 40 yards on 14 carries. The bad news for the Panthers was injuries to kicker Paul Blanda (knee) and All-American tackle Eldred Kraemer (dislocated shoulder).

The Pitt starting lineup for the game against Virginia was Joe Zombek (left end), Dick Gatz (left tackle), Harold Hunter (left guard), Ed Bose (center), Joe Los (right guard), Eldred Kraemer (right tackle), Dick Deitrick (right end), Henry Ford (quarterback), Gene Steratore (left halfback), Ray Ferguson (right halfback) and Bobby Epps (fullback). Substitutes appearing in the game for Pitt were Bob McQuaide, Glen Dillon, William Schmitt, John Cenci, Pete Neft, John Paluck, Fred Glatz, Rudy Mattioli, Joe Capp, Richie McCabe, Dick Manson, Howard Linn, Glen Tunning, Bob Ballock, Ed Johnson, Al Bolkovac, Bobby Grier, Don Michaels, Ray DiPasquale, William Cessar and Paul Blanda.

=== NC State ===
Week 8: NC State at Pitt

Team	1	2	3	4	Total
NC State	0	0	0	6	6
• Pitt	14	7	19	0	40

- Date: November 14, 1953
- Location: Pitt Stadium
  Pittsburgh, PA
- Game start: 1:30 p.m.
- Game attendance: 15,729
- Game weather: warm and hazy
- Referee: M. B. Mattox

Scoring summary
1	PITT	John Paluck recovered a blocked punt in the end zone (Paul Blanda kick)	PITT 7–0
1	PITT	Joe Capp 3-yard run ( Gene Steratore kick)	PITT 14– 0
2	PITT	Gene Steratore 1-yard run (Steratore kick)	PITT 21–0
3	PITT	Ray Ferguson 1-yard run (Steratore kick missed)	PITT 27–0
3	PITT	Bobby Grier 2-yard run (Don Michaels kick)	PITT 34–0
3	PITT	Pete Neft 4-yard quarterback keeper (Michaels kick missed)	PITT 40–0
4	NCST	Bill Teer 4-yard run (Al D'Angelo kick missed)	PITT 40–6

On November 14, the Panthers played in front of their home fans against the N. C. State Wolfpack. Pitt beat the Wolfpack 48–6 in their 1952 game. Second-year Coach Horace Hendrickson's Wolfpack was 1–6, and on a 4 game losing streak. Pitt scout Tom Glass told the Sun-Telegraph: “They have one senior playing regularly. They're already greatly improved over last year despite their record (1–6–1) and they're improving each week. They're capable of giving somebody a ball game–maybe it'll be this week.

Pitt Coach Dawson had to change the line-up due to injuries that occurred during the Virginia game. Starting right tackle Eldred Kraemer and right end Dick Deitrick were replaced by sophomores Howard Linn and John Paluck. Fullback Bobby Epps was replaced by Joe Capp. Halfback Dick Manson replaced Gene Steratore after gaining 57 yards on 11 carries against the Cavaliers.

In front of a High School Day crowd of 18,019, the Panthers romped over the Wolfpack for the second year in a row 40–6. Coach Dawson used 40 players. Six different Panthers scored touchdowns. Reserve tackle Howard Linn blocked Paul Smith's punt and reserve end John Paluck recovered it in the end zone for the first score. Joe Capp ended a 61-yard drive with a 2-yard run through right guard. Gene Steratore capped a 16-yard drive with a 1-yard plunge. Ray Ferguson ended a 4-play, 73-yard march with a 1-yard plunge. Bobby Grier's touchdown came after he raced 83 yards to the 2-yard line. On second down he scored over left guard. The final score was a quarterback sneak by Pete Neft from 3-yards away. A sore-kneed Paul Blanda converted the first extra point, which put him in first place all-time at Pitt with 45 conversions. Gene Steratore converted 2 of 3, and Don Michaels was good on 1 of 2. The Panthers gained 417 yards rushing, and sub-fullback Bobby Grier, who played only on defense in the Virginia game, led the Panthers with 198 yards on 13 carries. Joe Capp had 89 yards on 7 carries.

The Pitt starting lineup for the game against N. C. State was Joe Zombek (left end), Dick Gatz (left tackle), Harold Hunter (left guard), Ed Bose (center), Bob Kennedy (right guard), Howard Linn (right tackle), John Paluck (right end), Henry Ford (quarterback), Dick Manson (left halfback), Ray Ferguson (right halfback) and Joe Capp (fullback). Substitutes appearing in the game for Pitt were Bob McQuaide, Glen Dillon, Paul Kacik, Joe Los, William Schmitt, Rudy Grunder, Ken Voytell, Don Agafon, Bob Verna, John Cenci, Pete Neft, Fred Glatz, Rudy Mattioli, Richie McCabe, Glen Tunning, Bob Ballock, Gary LeDonne, Ed Johnson, Al Bolkovac, Gene Steratore, Bobby Grier, Don Michaels, Ray DiPasquale, Bill Hoffman, Chester Rice, Bob Keisel, John Jacobs, William Cessar and Paul Blanda.

=== Penn State ===
Week 9: Penn State at Pitt

Team	1	2	3	4	Total
• Penn State	0	10	7	0	17
Pitt	0	0	0	0	0

- Date: November 21, 1953
- Location: Pitt Stadium
  Pittsburgh, PA
- Game start: 1:30 p.m.
- Game attendance: 39,642
- Game weather: cloudy
- Referee: Alfred J. Booth (Yale)

Scoring summary
2	PSU	Jim Garrity 15-yard field goal	PSU 3–0
2	PSU	Lenny Moore 79-yard run (Garrity kick)	PSU 10–0
3	PSU	Buddy Rowell 1-yard run (Garrity kick)	PSU 17–0

On November 21, the annual game against Penn State concluded the season. Pitt with their 3–4–1 record was a surprising 6-point favorite over the 5–3 Nittany Lions. Pitt led the all-time series 30–20–2, but the Lions had won 2 of the past 3 games. Coach Rip Engle's Lions were led by 2 future All-Pros - halfback Lenny Moore and tackle Roosevelt Grier.

The Panthers were healthy except for tackle Eldred Kraemer (dislocated shoulder). Eight seniors wore the Panthers uniform for the final time – Bill Adams, Bill Priatko, Ken Voytell, Dick Deitrick, Bobby Epps, Ray Ferguson, Joe Zombek and Joe Capp. Coach Dawson told The Pitt News: “We'll give an all-out effort to win this one.”

In front of 42,277 fans, it was de'ja vu as the Nittany Lions beat the Panthers 17–0 for the second year in a row. After a scoreless first period, State scored early in the second on a 15-yard field goal by Jim Garrity to cap a 12-play, 75-yard drive. On State's next possession Lenny Moore raced 79 yards for a touchdown. Garrity's placement made the score 10–0 at halftime. State added their final score on their opening drive of the second half. They went 63-yards on 14 plays, with Buddy Rowell plunging the final yard for the touchdown. Garrity added the extra point. The Panthers drove to the Lions 6-yard line against their third string as time expired. Pitt had 9 first downs to 18 for the Lions. The Panthers offense got out gained 119 total yards to 391. The Pitt defense intercepted 4 passes (3 by Henry Ford to tie Bimbo Cecconi's one-game record) or the score could have been much worse.

The Pitt starting lineup for the game against Penn State was Joe Zombek (left end), Dick Gatz (left tackle), Harold Hunter (left guard), Ed Bose (center), Joe Los (right guard), Howard Linn (right tackle), Dick Deitrick (right end), Henry Ford (quarterback), Dick Manson (left halfback), Ray Ferguson (right halfback) and Bobby Epps (fullback). Substitutes appearing in the game for Pitt were Bob McQuaide, Glen Dillon, William Schmitt, John Cenci, William Cessar, Ed Stowe, Pete Neft, John Paluck, Fred Glatz, Rudy Mattioli, Joe Capp, Richie McCabe, Gene Steratore, Glen Tunning, Bob Ballock, Ed Johnson, Al Bolkovac, Bobby Grier, Don Michaels, Bill Hoffman and William Cessar.

== Postseason ==
Senior end and team captain, Dick Deitrick was named to the Newspaper Enterprise Association second-team All-American squad; was chosen to play for the North team in the annual Blue-Gray game on Christmas Day in Montgomery, Alabama; and was chosen by the American Football Coaches Association to their All-East team.

Tackle Eldred Kraemer was named third-team All-American by the United Press.

The Pitt freshmen team, coached by Steve Petro, completed a perfect season by going 5–0. They beat Penn State (19–9), Kent State (53–6), West Virginia (21–12), Navy 26–14 and Bullis Prep 19–6.

== Coaching staff ==
1953 Pittsburgh Panthers football staff
Coaching staff: Lowell Dawson – head coach; Bob Friedlund – defensive line coach; John Michelosen – backfield coach; Robert Timmons – end coach; Steve Petro – freshman coach; Walter Cummins– assistant freshman coach; Carl DePasqua – assistant freshman coach	Support staff: Thomas J. Hamilton – director of athletics and physical education; Bill Heyman – publicity director; Dr. Ralph Shanor – team physician; Howard Waite – trainer; Roger McGill – assistant trainer; Bill Haines – equipment manager; Russell McBride– student manager

== Roster ==
1953 Pittsburgh Panthers football roster
Player	Position	Games	Weight	Height	Class	Prep School	Hometown
Bob Wrabley	defensive halfback	0	170	5 ft 10 in	junior	Central Catholic H. S.	Pittsburgh, PA
Henry Ford *	quarterback	9	180	5 ft 10 in	junior	Schenley H. S.	Pittsburgh, PA
Rudy Mattioli*	quarterback	8	190	6 ft 1 in	junior	Har-Brack H. S./ Univ. of Kentucky	Har-Brack, PA
Pete Neft*	quarterback	8	180	6 ft 1 in	sophomore	Peabody H. S.	Pittsburgh, PA
Robert Johnson	quarterback	0	185	6 ft 1 in	junior	Fairmont H. S/ Univ. of West Virginia.	Fairmont, WV
Ray Ferguson*	fullback	8	185	5 ft 10 in	senior	Jersey Shore Area H. S.	Jersey Shore
Richie McCabe*	right halfback	8	170	6 ft	junior	North Catholic H. S.	Pittsburgh, PA
Chester Rice	left halfback	2	175	5 ft 10 in	junior	Derry Twp. High School	Derry Township, PA
Dick Manson*	left halfback	6	180	5 ft 10 in	sophomore	Franklin H. S.	Franklin, PA
John Jacobs*	halfback	6	195	5 ft 11 in	junior	Georges Twp. H. S.	Georges Twp., PA
Don Michaels	right halfback	3	190	6 ft	sophomore	Beaverdale H. S.	Beaverdale, PA
Gene Steratore*	right halfback	5	185	6 ft	sophomore	Washington H. S.	Washington, PA
Ray DiPasquale*	left halfback	6	165	5 ft 10 in	sophomore	Central Catholic H. S.	Pittsburgh, PA
Glenn Dillon	left halfback	3	185	6 ft	junior	Titusville H. S.	Titusville, PA
Joseph Capp*	fullback	7	195	5 ft 11 in	senior	Newton Falls H. S.	Newton Falls, OH
Bill Hoffman	halfback	3	190	5 ft 10 in	junior	Greensburg H. S.	Greensburg, PA
Bob Grier	fullback	3	185	6 ft 1 in	sophomore	Massillon H. S.	Massillon, OH
Paul Blanda*	linebacker	8	190	6 ft	junior	Youngwood H. S.	Youngwood, PA
Mike Omatick	linebacker	0	185	5 ft 10 in	senior	Connellsville H. S.	Connellsville, PA
Bobby Epps*	fullback	8	195	5 ft 8 in	senior	Swissvale H. S.	Swissvale, PA
Joe Los*	fullback	8	195	6 ft 11	sophomore	Ellworth H. S.	Ellsworth, PA
Bob Kiesel	fullback	1	195	5 ft 11 in	sophomore	Scranton H. S.	Scranton, PA
Ed Bose*	center	6	210	6 ft	sophomore	Old Westbury H. S.	Old Westbury, NY
Ed Johnson*	center	8	200	6 ft	sophomore	Wilkes Barre H. S.	Wilkes Barre, PA
Bob Ballock*	center	6	190	6 ft	junior	Farrell H. S.	Farrell, PA
Donald Schlick	center	0	195	6 ft	junior	Wheeling H. S.	Wheeling, WV
Gary LeDonne	center	2	185	6 ft 2 in	sophomore	Clairton H. S.	Clairton, PA
Al Bolkovac	guard	4	195	6 ft	sophomore	Youngstown H. S.	Youngstown, OH
Bob Kennedy	guard	2	185	5 ft 10 in	junior	Williamsport H. S.	Williamsport, PA
Walt Vonau	guard	1	195	5 ft 9 in	sophomore	Johnstown H. S.	Johnstown, PA
Dick Gatz*	guard	7	190	6 ft	senior	Carnegie H. S.	Carnegie, PA
Rudy Grunder	guard	3	200	5 ft 9 in	sophomore	Massillon H. S.	Massillon, OH
Glen Tunning	guard	4	225	5 ft 11 in	sophomore	Massillon H. S.	Massillon, OH
Ed Stowe*	guard	5	210	5 ft 10 in	sophomore	Somerville H. S.	Somerville, NJ
John Cenci*	guard	9	210	6 ft	sophomore	Schenley H. S.	Pittsburgh, PA
Harold Hunter*	guard	9	210	6 ft	sophomore	Canonsburg H. S.	Canonsburg, PA
Eldred Kraemer*	tackle	7	210	6 ft 3 in	junior	Clear Lake H. S.	Clear Lake, MN
Howard Linn*	tackle	8	200	5 ft 11 in	sophomore	Steubenville H.S.	Steubenville, OH
Ken Voytell	end	1	200	6 ft 1 in	senior	Clairton H. S./ St. Bonaventure Univ.	Clairton, PA
William Schmitt*	tackle	8	215	6 ft 1 in	sophomore	South Hills H. S.	Pittsburgh, PA
Don Agafon	tackle	1	210	6 ft 2 in	sophomore	Berwick H.S.	Berwick, PA
William Priatko	guard	0	210	6 ft 1 in	senior	North Braddock H. S.	North Braddock, PA
Bob Verna	tackle	1	210	6 ft	sophomore	Conemaugh Twp. H. S.	Jerome, PA
William Cessar*	tackle	8	205	6 ft 2 in	sophomore	Millvale H. S.	Millvale, PA
Phil DeArment	tackle	0	220	5 ft 11 in	sophomore	Bessemer H. S.	Bessemer, PA
Fred Glatz*	end	6	190	6 ft	sophomore	Central Catholic H. S.	Pittsburgh, PA
John Paluck*	end	8	210	6 ft 1 in	sophomore	Swoyersville H. S.	Swoyersville, PA
Joe Zombek*	end	9	185	6 ft	senior	Carnegie H. S.	Carnegie, PA
Robert McQuaide*	end	9	190	6 ft	junior	Indiana H. S.	Indiana, PA
Bill Adams	end	1	185	6 ft 2 in	senior	Oakmont H. S.	Oakmont, PA
Richard Deitrick*	end	8	215	6 ft 3 in	senior	Danville H. S.	Danville, PA
Paul Kacik	end	1	175	6 ft	sophomore	Monessen H. S.	Monessen, PA
Ray Macedonia	end	0	190	6 ft	junior	Oliver H. S.	Pittsburgh, PA
Louis Palatella	tackle	0	225	6 ft 1 in	junior	Vandergrift H.S.	Vandergrift, PA
* Letterman

== Individual scoring summary ==
1953 Pittsburgh Panthers scoring summary
Player	Touchdowns	Extra points	Field goals	Safety	Points
Bobby Epps	4	0	0	0	24
Henry Ford	3	0	0	0	18
Paul Blanda	0	13	0	0	13
Joe Capp	2	0	0	0	12
Pete Neft	2	0	0	0	12
Richie McCabe	2	0	0	0	12
Joe Zombek	2	0	0	0	12
Ray Ferguson	2	0	0	0	12
Gene Steratore	1	3	0	0	9
Glen Dillon	1	0	0	0	6
Bob Grier	1	0	0	0	6
John Paluck	1	0	0	0	6
Don Michaels	0	1	0	0	1
Totals	21	17	0	0	143

== Team players drafted into the NFL ==
The following players were selected in the 1954 NFL draft.

Player	Position	Round	Pick	NFL club
Joe Zombek	end	9	103	Pittsburgh Steelers
Lou Cimarolli	halfback	11	127	Pittsburgh Steelers
Bobby Epps	fullback	14	161	New York Giants
Dick Deitrick	end	29	346	Los Angeles Rams
