= 1953 Army Cadets football team =

American college football season

1953 Army Cadets football

Eastern champion
- Conference: Independent

Ranking
- Coaches: No. 16
- AP: No. 14
- Record: 7–1–1
- Head coach: Earl Blaik (13th season)
- Offensive scheme: T formation
- Captain: LeRoy Lunn

1953 Eastern college football independents records
	Conf.			Overall
Team	W	L	T	W		L		T
Westminster (PA)		–		8	–	0	–	0
Juniata		–		7	–	0	–	0
No. 14 Army		–		7	–	1	–	1
Franklin & Marshall		–		5	–	2	–	0
Hofstra		–		6	–	3	–	0
Penn State		–		6	–	3	–	0
Carnegie Tech		–		5	–	3	–	0
Boston College		–		5	–	3	–	1
Boston University		–		5	–	3	–	1
Syracuse		–		5	–	3	–	1
Tufts		–		4	–	3	–	0
Holy Cross		–		5	–	5	–	0
Temple		–		4	–	4	–	1
Colgate		–		3	–	4	–	2
Fordham		–		4	–	5	–	0
Villanova		–		4	–	6	–	0
Drexel		–		2	–	3	–	1
Pittsburgh		–		3	–	5	–	1
Buffalo		–		1	–	5	–	1
Bucknell		–		1	–	8	–	0
Rankings from AP Poll

The 1953 Army Cadets football team represented the United States Military Academy as an independent during the 1953 college football season. Led by head coach Earl Blaik, the team finished with a record of 7–1–1. The Cadets won the Lambert-Meadowlands Trophy, awarded to the top college team in the East.

The Cadets had lost six players, including Freddie Myers, to academic ineligibility. The Cadets defeated Furman, 41–0, the team's first shutout since the 1951 scandal. After a loss to Northwestern, the Cadets were undefeated for the rest of the season. In a scoreless tie against Tulane, future Max McGee starred for the Green Wave. In the Army–Navy Game, Army's 20–7 victory over Navy was its first since 1949. The turning point of the season was an October victory over No. 7 Duke. The Blue Devils featured stars such as Red Smith and Worth (A Million) Lutz. Tommy Bell ran up the middle. Quarterback Pete Vann switched the ball to his left hand, and made a southpaw pass. Red Smith was tackled by Bob Mischak in the final minutes of the game. Mischak ran 73 yards to make the tackle catching up eight yards of separation to save a touchdown. Inspired by Mischak, Army held Duke inside the one yard line, took over on downs, and eventually won the game. "When Bob Mischak, who was posthumously enshrined in the Army/West Point Sports Hall of Fame in 2017, made that unlikely play, what Blaik called 'a marvelous display of heart and pursuit', the Army football team regained its soul." Direct quote from Maraness

== Schedule ==
Date	Time	Opponent	Rank	Site	TV	Result	Attendance	Source
September 26		Furman		Michie Stadium; West Point, NY		W 41–0	8,450	
October 3		at Northwestern		Dyche Stadium; Evanston, IL		L 20–33	32,000	
October 10		Dartmouth		Michie Stadium; West Point, NY		W 27–0	17,525	
October 17		vs. No. 7 Duke		Polo Grounds; New York, NY		W 14–13	21,282–21,284	
October 24		Columbia		Michie Stadium; West Point, NY		W 40–7	23,520	
October 31		at Tulane	No. 15	Tulane Stadium; New Orleans, LA		T 0–0	32,500–40,000	
November 7		NC State		Michie Stadium; West Point, NY		W 27–7	9,230–9,400	
November 14		at Penn		Franklin Field; Philadelphia, PA		W 21–14	47,305	
November 28	1:15 p.m.	vs. Navy	No. 18	Philadelphia Municipal Stadium; Philadelphia, PA (Army–Navy Game)	NBC	W 20–7	102,000	
Rankings from AP Poll released prior to the game; All times are in Eastern time

== Roster ==
1953 Army Cadets football team roster
Players
Coaches
Offense

Pos.	#	Name	Class
HB		Tommy Bell	Jr
G		Ralph Chesnauskas	So
E		Don Holleder	So
FB		Pat Uebel	So
QB		Pete Vann	Jr
G		Leroy Lunn (C)	Sr

Defense

Pos.	#	Name	Class

Special teams

Pos.	#	Name	Class

Head coach

- Earl Blaik

Coordinators/assistant coaches

Legend

- (C) Team captain
- (S) Suspended
- (I) Ineligible
- Injured
- Redshirt

== New York Giants coaching vacancy ==
Before the end of the 1953 season, the New York Daily News had a headline in their paper that Vince Lombardi was the top candidate to become the Giants new head coach. Although Giants co-owner Wellington Mara was a classmate of Lombardi at Fordham University, the Giants were actually interested in Army head coach, Colonel Red Blaik. Blaik had declined the job, but recommended Lombardi, who was his offensive coordinator at Army. Despite being Red Blaik's top aide, Vince Lombardi was anxious and frustrated. Three other Army assistants, including Murray Warmath were now head coaches. In June, Lombardi had turned forty years old. Lombardi would be hired as the offensive co-ordinator for the 1954 season.
