= 1953 Yale Bulldogs football team =

American college football season

1953 Yale Bulldogs football
- Conference: Independent
- Record: 5–2–2
- Head coach: Jordan Olivar (2nd season)
- Captain: Joe Fortunato
- Home stadium: Yale Bowl

1953 Ivy League football standings
	Conf.					Overall
Team	W		L		T	W		L		T
Cornell	3	–	0	–	2	4	–	3	–	2
Harvard	3	–	2	–	0	6	–	2	–	0
Yale	3	–	2	–	1	5	–	2	–	2
Princeton	3	–	3	–	0	5	–	4	–	0
Columbia	2	–	3	–	0	4	–	5	–	0
Dartmouth	2	–	3	–	0	2	–	7	–	0
Brown	0	–	3	–	0	3	–	5	–	1
Penn	0	–	0	–	1	3	–	5	–	1
The Ivy League in 1953 completed on a league basis in baseball, basketball, hockey, tennis and swimming. In football, there was an agreement among the schools to establish conditions to assure sportsmanship and amateurism. Moreover, newspapers regularly printed football standings for the Ivy League schools.

The 1953 Yale Bulldogs football team represented Yale University in the 1953 college football season. The Bulldogs were led by second-year head coach Jordan Olivar, played their home games at the Yale Bowl and finished the season with a 5–2–2 record.

== Schedule ==
Date	Opponent	Site	Result	Attendance	Source
September 26	Connecticut	Yale Bowl; New Haven, CT	W 32–0	20,000	
October 3	Brown	Yale Bowl; New Haven, CT	W 13–0	24,000	
October 8	Columbia	Yale Bowl; New Haven, CT	W 13–7	28,000	
October 17	at Cornell	Schoellkopf Field; Ithaca, NY	T 0–0	25,000	
October 24	Colgate	Yale Bowl; New Haven, CT	T 7–7	25,000	
October 31	Dartmouth	Yale Bowl; New Haven, CT	L 0–32	38,000	
November 7	Temple	Yale Bowl; New Haven, CT	W 32–6	3,500	
November 14	at Princeton	Palmer Stadium; Princeton, NJ (rivalry)	W 26–24	45,000	
November 21	Harvard	Yale Bowl; New Haven, CT (The Game)	L 0–13	65,000	
