= 1953 Harvard Crimson football team =

American college football season

1953 Harvard Crimson football
- Conference: Ivy League
- Record: 6–2 (3–2 Ivy)
- Head coach: Lloyd Jordan (4th season)
- Captain: Richard J. Clasby
- Home stadium: Harvard Stadium

1953 Ivy League football standings
	Conf.					Overall
Team	W		L		T	W		L		T
Cornell	3	–	0	–	2	4	–	3	–	2
Harvard	3	–	2	–	0	6	–	2	–	0
Yale	3	–	2	–	1	5	–	2	–	2
Princeton	3	–	3	–	0	5	–	4	–	0
Columbia	2	–	3	–	0	4	–	5	–	0
Dartmouth	2	–	3	–	0	2	–	7	–	0
Brown	0	–	3	–	0	3	–	5	–	1
Penn	0	–	0	–	1	3	–	5	–	1
The Ivy League in 1953 completed on a league basis in baseball, basketball, hockey, tennis and swimming. In football, there was an agreement among the schools to establish conditions to assure sportsmanship and amateurism. Moreover, newspapers regularly printed football standings for the Ivy League schools.

The 1953 Harvard Crimson football team was an American football team that represented Harvard University during the 1953 college football season. In their fourth year under head coach Lloyd Jordan, the Crimson compiled a 6–2 record and outscored opponents 146 to 78. Richard J. Clasby was the team captain.

Harvard was part of the informal Ivy League in 1953. Harvard had the second best record in games against Ivy opponents (3–2).

Harvard played its home games at Harvard Stadium in the Allston neighborhood of Boston, Massachusetts.

== Schedule ==
Date	Opponent	Site	Result	Attendance	Source
October 3	Ohio	Harvard Stadium; Boston, MA	W 16–0	14,500	
October 10	Colgate	Harvard Stadium; Boston, MA	W 28–26	12,000	
October 17	at Columbia	Baker Field; New York, NY	L 0–6	20,000	
October 24	Dartmouth	Harvard Stadium; Boston, MA (rivalry)	W 20–14	24,000	
October 31	Davidson	Harvard Stadium; Boston, MA	W 42–6	8,500	
November 7	Princeton	Harvard Stadium; Boston, MA (rivalry)	L 0–6	24,000	
November 14	Brown	Harvard Stadium; Boston, MA	W 27–20	20,500	
November 21	at Yale	Yale Bowl; New Haven, CT (The Game)	W 13–0	65,000	
