= 1949 Lafayette Leopards football team =

American college football season

1949 Lafayette Leopards football
- Conference: Middle Three Conference
- Record: 2–6 (1–1 Middle Three)
- Head coach: Clipper Smith (1st season)
- Captains: Gordon Schleer; Joseph Zahurak
- Home stadium: Fisher Field

1949 Middle Three Conference football standings
	Conf.					Overall
Team	W		L		T	W		L		T
Rutgers $	2	–	0	–	0	6	–	3	–	0
Lafayette	1	–	1	–	0	2	–	6	–	0
Lehigh	0	–	2	–	0	6	–	3	–	0
$ – Conference champion

The 1949 Lafayette Leopards football team was an American football team that represented Lafayette College in the Middle Three Conference during the 1949 college football season. In its first season under head coach Clipper Smith, the team compiled a 2–6 record. Gordon Schleer and Joseph Zahurak were the team captains. The team played home games at Fisher Field in Easton, Pennsylvania.

== Schedule ==
Date	Opponent	Site	Result	Attendance	Source
September 24	at Princeton*	Palmer Stadium; Princeton, NJ	L 14–26	8,200	
October 1	at Syracuse*	Archbold Stadium; Syracuse, NY	L 13–20	22,000	
October 8	Muhlenberg*	Fisher Field; Easton, PA	W 35–14	7,000	
October 22	Delaware*	Fisher Field; Easton, PA	L 0–7	8,000	
October 28	at George Washington*	Griffith Stadium; Washington, DC	L 7–14	3,954	
November 5	Rutgers	Fisher Field; Easton, PA	L 0–14	8,500	
November 12	Bucknell*	Fisher Field; Easton, PA	L 14–21	6,000	
November 19	at Lehigh	Liberty High School Stadium; Bethlehem, PA (The Rivalry)	W 21–12	17,000	
*Non-conference game
