= 1953 Boston University Terriers football team =

American college football season

1953 Boston University Terriers football
- Conference: Independent
- Record: 5–3–1
- Head coach: Aldo Donelli (7th season)
- Home stadium: Braves Field

1953 Eastern college football independents records
	Conf.			Overall
Team	W	L	T	W		L		T
Westminster (PA)		–		8	–	0	–	0
Juniata		–		7	–	0	–	0
No. 14 Army		–		7	–	1	–	1
Franklin & Marshall		–		5	–	2	–	0
Hofstra		–		6	–	3	–	0
Penn State		–		6	–	3	–	0
Carnegie Tech		–		5	–	3	–	0
Boston College		–		5	–	3	–	1
Boston University		–		5	–	3	–	1
Syracuse		–		5	–	3	–	1
Tufts		–		4	–	3	–	0
Holy Cross		–		5	–	5	–	0
Temple		–		4	–	4	–	1
Colgate		–		3	–	4	–	2
Fordham		–		4	–	5	–	0
Villanova		–		4	–	6	–	0
Drexel		–		2	–	3	–	1
Pittsburgh		–		3	–	5	–	1
Buffalo		–		1	–	5	–	1
Bucknell		–		1	–	8	–	0
Rankings from AP Poll

The 1953 Boston University Terriers football team was an American football team that represented Boston University as an independent during the 1953 college football season. In its seventh season under head coach Aldo Donelli, the team compiled a 5–3–1 record and outscored by their opponents by a total of 224 to 135.

== Schedule ==
Date	Time	Opponent	Site	Result	Attendance	Source
October 2		at Syracuse	Archbold Stadium; Syracuse, NY	T 14–14	18,000	
October 10		Penn State	Braves Field; Boston, MA	L 13–35	12,338	
October 17	2:00 p.m.	Brandeis	Braves Field; Boston, MA	W 40–14	8,500	
October 23		Lehigh	Braves Field; Boston, MA	W 52–12	8,000	
October 30	8:30 p.m.	Marquette	Braves Field; Boston, MA	L 6–7	19,730	
November 7		at Holy Cross	Fitton Field; Worcester, MA	L 7–20	6,000	
November 14		Villanova	Braves Field; Boston, MA	W 31–19	10,944	
November 21		at Temple	Temple Stadium; Philadelphia, PA	W 20–0	5,000	
November 28	1:30 p.m.	at William & Mary	Cary Field; Williamsburg, VA	W 41–14	2,300	
All times are in Eastern time
