= 1953 Princeton Tigers football team =

American college football season

1953 Princeton Tigers football
- Conference: Independent
- Record: 5–4
- Head coach: Charlie Caldwell (9th season)
- Captain: Homer A. Smith
- Home stadium: Palmer Stadium

1953 Ivy League football standings
	Conf.					Overall
Team	W		L		T	W		L		T
Cornell	3	–	0	–	2	4	–	3	–	2
Harvard	3	–	2	–	0	6	–	2	–	0
Yale	3	–	2	–	1	5	–	2	–	2
Princeton	3	–	3	–	0	5	–	4	–	0
Columbia	2	–	3	–	0	4	–	5	–	0
Dartmouth	2	–	3	–	0	2	–	7	–	0
Brown	0	–	3	–	0	3	–	5	–	1
Penn	0	–	0	–	1	3	–	5	–	1
The Ivy League in 1953 completed on a league basis in baseball, basketball, hockey, tennis and swimming. In football, there was an agreement among the schools to establish conditions to assure sportsmanship and amateurism. Moreover, newspapers regularly printed football standings for the Ivy League schools.

The 1953 Princeton Tigers football team was an American football team that represented Princeton University during the 1953 college football season. In their ninth year under head coach Charlie Caldwell, the Tigers compiled a 5–4 record but were outscored 204 to 144. Homer A. Smith was the team captain.

The Tigers were ranked No. 19 in the preseason AP poll but dropped out of the rankings after the first week of play.

Princeton played its home games at Palmer Stadium on the university campus in Princeton, New Jersey.

== Schedule ==
Date	Opponent	Rank	Site	Result	Attendance	Source
September 26	Lafayette	No. 19	Palmer Stadium; Princeton, NJ	W 20–14	10,000	
October 3	Columbia		Palmer Stadium; Princeton, NJ	W 20–19	17,500	
October 10	Rutgers		Palmer Stadium; Princeton, NJ (rivalry)	W 9–7	25,000	
October 17	No. 14 Navy		Palmer Stadium; Princeton, NJ	L 7–65	44,000	
October 24	Cornell		Palmer Stadium; Princeton, NJ	L 19–26	25,000	
October 31	Brown		Palmer Stadium; Princeton, NJ	W 27–13	15,000	
November 7	at Harvard		Harvard Stadium; Boston, MA (rivalry)	W 6–0	24,000	
November 14	Yale		Palmer Stadium; Princeton, NJ (rivalry)	L 24–26	45,000	
November 21	Dartmouth		Palmer Stadium; Princeton, NJ	L 12–34	23,000	
Rankings from AP Poll released prior to the game
