= 1953 Lafayette Leopards football team =

American college football season

1953 Lafayette Leopards football
- Conference: Middle Three Conference
- Record: 5–4 (1–1 Middle Three)
- Head coach: Steve Hokuf (2nd season)
- Captain: Joseph O'Lenic
- Home stadium: Fisher Field

1953 Middle Three Conference football standings
	Conf.					Overall
Team	W		L		T	W		L		T
Rutgers $	1	–	0	–	0	2	–	6	–	0
Lafayette	1	–	1	–	0	5	–	4	–	0
Lehigh	0	–	1	–	0	4	–	5	–	0
$ – Conference champion

The 1953 Lafayette Leopards football team was an American football team that represented Lafayette College in the Middle Three Conference during the 1953 college football season. In its second season under head coach Steve Hokuf, the team compiled a 5–4 record. Joseph O'Lenic was the team captain. The team played home games at Fisher Field in Easton, Pennsylvania.

== Schedule ==
Date	Opponent	Site	Result	Attendance	Source
September 26	at Princeton*	Palmer Stadium; Princeton, NJ	L 14–20	10,000	
October 3	at Albright*	Albright College Stadium; Reading, PA	W 28–7	5,000	
October 10	Muhlenberg*	Fisher Field; Easton, PA	L 7–20	7,000	
October 17	Western Maryland*	Fisher Field; Easton, PA	W 28–0		
October 24	Bucknell*	Fisher Field; Easton, PA	W 7–6	8,000	
October 31	at Franklin & Marshall*	Sponaugle-Williamson Field; Lancaster, PA	W 34–13	6,500	
November 7	Rutgers	Fisher Field; Easton, PA	L 13–14	4,000	
November 14	Delaware*	Fisher Field; Easton, PA	L 7–13	5,000	
November 21	at Lehigh	Taylor Stadium; Bethlehem, PA (rivalry)	W 33–13	14,000	
*Non-conference game
