= 1953 Syracuse Orangemen football team =

American college football season

1953 Syracuse Orangemen football
- Conference: Independent
- Record: 5–3–1
- Head coach: Ben Schwartzwalder (5th season)
- Captain: Game captains
- Home stadium: Archbold Stadium

1953 Eastern college football independents records
	Conf.			Overall
Team	W	L	T	W		L		T
Westminster (PA)		–		8	–	0	–	0
Juniata		–		7	–	0	–	0
No. 14 Army		–		7	–	1	–	1
Franklin & Marshall		–		5	–	2	–	0
Hofstra		–		6	–	3	–	0
Penn State		–		6	–	3	–	0
Carnegie Tech		–		5	–	3	–	0
Boston College		–		5	–	3	–	1
Boston University		–		5	–	3	–	1
Syracuse		–		5	–	3	–	1
Tufts		–		4	–	3	–	0
Holy Cross		–		5	–	5	–	0
Temple		–		4	–	4	–	1
Colgate		–		3	–	4	–	2
Fordham		–		4	–	5	–	0
Villanova		–		4	–	6	–	0
Drexel		–		2	–	3	–	1
Pittsburgh		–		3	–	5	–	1
Buffalo		–		1	–	5	–	1
Bucknell		–		1	–	8	–	0
Rankings from AP Poll

The 1953 Syracuse Orangemen football team represented Syracuse University as an independent during the 1953 college football season. The Orangemen were led by fifth-year head coach Ben Schwartzwalder and played their home games at Archbold Stadium in Syracuse, New York. Syracuse finished the season with a 5–3–1 record and were not invited to a bowl game.

== Schedule ==
Date	Opponent	Site	Result	Attendance	Source
September 26	Temple	Archbold Stadium; Syracuse, NY	W 42–0	20,000	
October 2	Boston University	Archbold Stadium; Syracuse, NY	T 14–14	18,000	
October 10	Fordham	Archbold Stadium; Syracuse, NY	W 20–13	20,000	
October 17	at Penn State	New Beaver Field; University Park, PA (rivalry)	L 14–20	21,500	
October 24	at No. 7 Illinois	Memorial Stadium; Champaign, IL	L 13–20	30,076	
October 31	at Holy Cross	Fitton Field; Worcester, MA	W 21–0	15,000	
November 7	at Cornell	Schoellkopf Field; Ithaca, NY	W 26–0	12,000	
November 14	Colgate	Archbold Stadium; Syracuse, NY (rivalry)	W 34–18	37,000	
November 21	at Villanova	Franklin Field; Philadelphia, PA	L 13–14	10,146	
Rankings from AP Poll released prior to the game
