= 1953 Temple Owls football team =

American college football season

1953 Temple Owls football
- Conference: Independent
- Record: 4–4–1
- Head coach: Albert Kawal (5th season)
- Home stadium: Temple Stadium

1953 Eastern college football independents records
| | Conf. | | | Overall |
| Team | W | L | T | W | | L | | T |
|---|---|---|---|---|---|---|---|---|
| Westminster (PA) | | – | | 8 | – | 0 | – | 0 |
| Juniata | | – | | 7 | – | 0 | – | 0 |
| No. 14 Army | | – | | 7 | – | 1 | – | 1 |
| Franklin & Marshall | | – | | 5 | – | 2 | – | 0 |
| Hofstra | | – | | 6 | – | 3 | – | 0 |
| Penn State | | – | | 6 | – | 3 | – | 0 |
| Carnegie Tech | | – | | 5 | – | 3 | – | 0 |
| Boston College | | – | | 5 | – | 3 | – | 1 |
| Boston University | | – | | 5 | – | 3 | – | 1 |
| Syracuse | | – | | 5 | – | 3 | – | 1 |
| Tufts | | – | | 4 | – | 3 | – | 0 |
| Holy Cross | | – | | 5 | – | 5 | – | 0 |
| Temple | | – | | 4 | – | 4 | – | 1 |
| Colgate | | – | | 3 | – | 4 | – | 2 |
| Fordham | | – | | 4 | – | 5 | – | 0 |
| Villanova | | – | | 4 | – | 6 | – | 0 |
| Drexel | | – | | 2 | – | 3 | – | 1 |
| Pittsburgh | | – | | 3 | – | 5 | – | 1 |
| Buffalo | | – | | 1 | – | 5 | – | 1 |
| Bucknell | | – | | 1 | – | 8 | – | 0 |
Rankings from AP Poll

The 1953 Temple Owls football team was an American football team that represented Temple University as an independent during the 1953 college football season. In its fourth season under head coach Albert Kawal, the team compiled a 4–4–1 record. The team played its home games at Temple Stadium in Philadelphia.

== Schedule ==
| Date | Opponent | Site | Result | Attendance | Source |
|---|---|---|---|---|---|
| September 18 | Albright | Temple Stadium; Philadelphia, PA | W 34–0 | 7,500 | |
| September 26 | at Syracuse | Archbold Stadium; Syracuse, NY | L 0–42 | 18,000 | |
| October 2 | Bowling Green | Temple Stadium; Philadelphia, PA | W 27–0 | 5,000 | |
| October 17 | at Bucknell | Memorial Stadium; Lewisburg, PA | W 27–21 | 10,000 | |
| October 24 | Scranton | Temple Stadium; Philadelphia, PA | W 33–7 | 7,500 | |
| October 31 | United States Naval Training Center Bainbridge^{†} | Temple Stadium; Philadelphia, PA | T 7–7 | 7,500 | |
| November 7 | at Yale | Yale Bowl; New Haven, CT | L 6–32 | 3,500 | |
| November 14 | at Fordham | Polo Grounds; New York, NY | L 0–28 | 7,919 | |
| November 21 | Boston University | Temple Stadium; Philadelphia, PA | L 0–20 | 5,000 | |
^{†}Homecoming
