= Art Raimo =

Biographical details
- Born: April 24, 1916; East Boston, Massachusetts, U.S.
- Died: October 9, 2001 (aged 85); Wallingford, Pennsylvania, U.S.

Playing career
- 1935–1937: Villanova
- Position: Fullback

Coaching career (HC unless noted)
- 1946–1950: Villanova (assistant)
- 1951–1953: Villanova
- 1954–1962: Yale (DC)
- 1964–1966: Pennsylvania Military

Administrative career (AD unless noted)
- 1952–1953: Villanova

Head coaching record
- Overall: 24–29–1

Arthur F. Raimo (April 24, 1916 – October 9, 2001) was an American football player, coach, and college athletics administrator. He served as the head football coach at Villanova University—known as Villanova College until 1953—from 1951 to 1953 and at Pennsylvania Military College—now Widener University—from 1964 to 1966, compiling a career college football coaching record of 24–29–1.

Raimo was also the athletic director at Villanova from 1952 to 1953. Between his head coaching stints at Villanova and Pennsylvania Military, he was the defensive coordinator at Yale University, from 1954 through 1962, working under fellow Villanova alumnus Jordan Olivar.

== Biography ==
A native of East Boston, Massachusetts, Raimo attended Everett High School in Everett, Massachusetts. He then continued his education and football playing career at Villanova University, where he graduated in 1938 with a degree in education. After playing semi-professional football for two years upon graduating, Raimo began his career as a teacher and also football coach at Ridley Township High School in Folsom, Pennsylvania.

In 1980 Raimo was inducted into the Pennsylvania Sports Hall of Fame. On October 9, 2001, Raimo died from complications of Alzheimer's disease at the age of 85.

== Head coaching record ==
Year	Team	Overall	Conference	Standing	Bowl/playoffs
Villanova Wildcats (Independent) (1951–1953)
1951	Villanova	5–3			
1952	Villanova	7–1–1			
1953	Villanova	4–6			
Villanova:		16–10–1			
Pennsylvania Military Cadets (Middle Atlantic Conference) (1964–1966)
1964	Pennsylvania Military	4–5	4–4	T–4th (Southern College)	
1965	Pennsylvania Military	2–7	2–6	8th (Southern College)	
1966	Pennsylvania Military	2–7	2–6	T–7th (Southern College)	
Pennsylvania Military:		8–19	8–16		
Total:		24–29–1			
