= 1953 Bucknell Bison football team =

American college football season

1953 Bucknell Bison football
- Conference: Independent
- Record: 1–8
- Head coach: Harry Lawrence (7th season)
- Captains: Jim Egloff; Paul Ganz; Bill Gray
- Home stadium: Memorial Stadium

1953 Eastern college football independents records
	Conf.			Overall
Team	W	L	T	W		L		T
Westminster (PA)		–		8	–	0	–	0
Juniata		–		7	–	0	–	0
No. 14 Army		–		7	–	1	–	1
Franklin & Marshall		–		5	–	2	–	0
Hofstra		–		6	–	3	–	0
Penn State		–		6	–	3	–	0
Carnegie Tech		–		5	–	3	–	0
Boston College		–		5	–	3	–	1
Boston University		–		5	–	3	–	1
Syracuse		–		5	–	3	–	1
Tufts		–		4	–	3	–	0
Holy Cross		–		5	–	5	–	0
Temple		–		4	–	4	–	1
Colgate		–		3	–	4	–	2
Fordham		–		4	–	5	–	0
Villanova		–		4	–	6	–	0
Drexel		–		2	–	3	–	1
Pittsburgh		–		3	–	5	–	1
Buffalo		–		1	–	5	–	1
Bucknell		–		1	–	8	–	0
Rankings from AP Poll

The 1953 Bucknell Bison football team was an American football team that represented Bucknell University as an independent during the 1953 college football season.

In its seventh season under head coach Harry Lawrence, the team compiled a 1–8 record. Paul Ganz, Bill Gray and Jim Egloff were the team captains.

The team played its home games at Memorial Stadium on the university campus in Lewisburg, Pennsylvania.

== Schedule ==
Date	Opponent	Site	Result	Attendance	Source
September 26	Buffalo	Memorial Stadium; Lewisburg, PA	W 35–6		
October 3	Muhlenberg	Memorial Stadium; Lewisburg, PA	L 13–18	4,500	
October 10	at Holy Cross	Fitton Field; Worcester, MA	L 0–40	10,000	
October 17	Temple^{†}	Memorial Stadium; Lewisburg, PA	L 21–27	10,000	
October 24	at Lafayette	Fisher Field; Easton, PA	L 6–7	8,000	
October 31	at Lehigh	Taylor Stadium; Bethlehem, PA	L 6–20		
November 7	at Colgate	Colgate Athletic Field; Hamilton, NY	L 12–19	2,700	
November 14	at Gettysburg	Musselman Stadium; Gettysburg, PA	L 13–26	3,500	
November 21	Delaware	Memorial Stadium; Lewisburg, PA	L 13–34	2,500	
^{†}Homecoming
