= 1953 Dartmouth Indians football team =

American college football season

1953 Dartmouth Indians football
- Conference: Independent
- Record: 2–7
- Head coach: Tuss McLaughry (11th season)
- Captain: Bayard Johnson
- Home stadium: Memorial Field

1953 Ivy League football standings
| | Conf. | | | | | Overall |
| Team | W | | L | | T | W | | L | | T |
|---|---|---|---|---|---|---|---|---|---|---|
| Cornell | 3 | – | 0 | – | 2 | 4 | – | 3 | – | 2 |
| Harvard | 3 | – | 2 | – | 0 | 6 | – | 2 | – | 0 |
| Yale | 3 | – | 2 | – | 1 | 5 | – | 2 | – | 2 |
| Princeton | 3 | – | 3 | – | 0 | 5 | – | 4 | – | 0 |
| Columbia | 2 | – | 3 | – | 0 | 4 | – | 5 | – | 0 |
| Dartmouth | 2 | – | 3 | – | 0 | 2 | – | 7 | – | 0 |
| Brown | 0 | – | 3 | – | 0 | 3 | – | 5 | – | 1 |
| Penn | 0 | – | 0 | – | 1 | 3 | – | 5 | – | 1 |
The Ivy League in 1953 completed on a league basis in baseball, basketball, hockey, tennis and swimming. In football, there was an agreement among the schools to establish conditions to assure sportsmanship and amateurism. Moreover, newspapers regularly printed football standings for the Ivy League schools.

The 1953 Dartmouth Indians football team was an American football team that represented Dartmouth College as an independent during the 1953 college football season. In their 11th season under head coach Tuss McLaughry, the Indians compiled a 2–7 record, and were outscored 219 to 152. Bayard Johnson was the team captain.

Dartmouth played its home games at Memorial Field on the college campus in Hanover, New Hampshire.

== Schedule ==
| Date | Opponent | Site | Result | Attendance | Source |
|---|---|---|---|---|---|
| September 26 | vs. Holy Cross | Manning Bowl; Lynn, MA | L 6–28 | 10,000 | |
| October 3 | at Navy | Thompson Stadium; Annapolis, MD | L 7–55 | 15,500 | |
| October 10 | at Army | Michie Stadium; West Point, NY | L 0–27 | 17,525 | |
| October 17 | Colgate | Memorial Field; Hanover, NH | L 14–24 | 12,000 | |
| October 24 | at Harvard | Harvard Stadium; Boston, MA (rivalry) | L 14–20 | 24,000 | |
| October 31 | at Yale | Yale Bowl; New Haven, CT | W 32–0 | 38,000 | |
| November 7 | at Columbia | Baker Field; New York, NY | L 19–25 | 5,000 | |
| November 14 | Cornell | Memorial Field; Hanover, NH (rivalry) | L 26–28 | 15,000 | |
| November 21 | at Princeton | Palmer Stadium; Princeton, NJ | W 34–12 | 23,000 | |
