= 1953 Holy Cross Crusaders football team =

American college football season

1953 Holy Cross Crusaders football
- Conference: Independent
- Record: 5–5
- Head coach: Eddie Anderson (10th season)
- Home stadium: Fitton Field

1953 Eastern college football independents records
	Conf.			Overall
Team	W	L	T	W		L		T
Westminster (PA)		–		8	–	0	–	0
Juniata		–		7	–	0	–	0
No. 14 Army		–		7	–	1	–	1
Franklin & Marshall		–		5	–	2	–	0
Hofstra		–		6	–	3	–	0
Penn State		–		6	–	3	–	0
Carnegie Tech		–		5	–	3	–	0
Boston College		–		5	–	3	–	1
Boston University		–		5	–	3	–	1
Syracuse		–		5	–	3	–	1
Tufts		–		4	–	3	–	0
Holy Cross		–		5	–	5	–	0
Temple		–		4	–	4	–	1
Colgate		–		3	–	4	–	2
Fordham		–		4	–	5	–	0
Villanova		–		4	–	6	–	0
Drexel		–		2	–	3	–	1
Pittsburgh		–		3	–	5	–	1
Buffalo		–		1	–	5	–	1
Bucknell		–		1	–	8	–	0
Rankings from AP Poll

The 1953 Holy Cross Crusaders football team was an American football team that represented the College of the Holy Cross as an independent during the 1953 college football season. In its tenth year under head coach Eddie Anderson, the team compiled a 5–5 record. The team played its home games at Fitton Field in Worcester, Massachusetts.

== Schedule ==
Date	Opponent	Site	Result	Attendance	Source
September 26	vs. Dartmouth	Manning Bowl; Lynn, MA	W 28–6	10,000	
October 3	at Colgate	Colgate Athletic Field; Hamilton, NY	W 19–6	6,000	
October 10	Bucknell	Fitton Field; Worcester, MA	W 40–0	10,000	
October 18	Quantico Marines	Fitton Field; Worcester, MA	L 0–17	20,000	
October 24	at Brown	Brown Stadium; Providence, RI	L 0–6	13,000	
October 31	Syracuse^{†}	Fitton Field; Worcester, MA	L 0–21	15,000	
November 7	Boston University	Fitton Field; Worcester, MA	W 20–7	6,000	
November 14	Marquette	Fitton Field; Worcester, MA	L 7–13	8,000	
November 21	Fordham	Fitton Field; Worcester, MA	W 20–7	12,000	
November 28	vs. Boston College	Fenway Park; Boston, MA	L 0–6	35,000	
^{†}Homecoming
