= 1953 Colgate Red Raiders football team =

American college football season

1953 Colgate Red Raiders football
- Conference: Independent
- Record: 3–4–2
- Head coach: Hal Lahar (2nd season)
- Captain: Gary Chandler
- Home stadium: Colgate Athletic Field

1953 Eastern college football independents records
	Conf.			Overall
Team	W	L	T	W		L		T
Westminster (PA)		–		8	–	0	–	0
Juniata		–		7	–	0	–	0
No. 14 Army		–		7	–	1	–	1
Franklin & Marshall		–		5	–	2	–	0
Hofstra		–		6	–	3	–	0
Penn State		–		6	–	3	–	0
Carnegie Tech		–		5	–	3	–	0
Boston College		–		5	–	3	–	1
Boston University		–		5	–	3	–	1
Syracuse		–		5	–	3	–	1
Tufts		–		4	–	3	–	0
Holy Cross		–		5	–	5	–	0
Temple		–		4	–	4	–	1
Colgate		–		3	–	4	–	2
Fordham		–		4	–	5	–	0
Villanova		–		4	–	6	–	0
Drexel		–		2	–	3	–	1
Pittsburgh		–		3	–	5	–	1
Buffalo		–		1	–	5	–	1
Bucknell		–		1	–	8	–	0
Rankings from AP Poll

The 1953 Colgate Red Raiders football team was an American football team that represented Colgate University as an independent during the 1953 college football season. In its second season under head coach Hal Lahar, the team compiled a 3–4–2 record and was outscored by a total of 161 to 147. Gary Chandler was the team captain. The team played its home games at Colgate Athletic Field in Hamilton, New York.

== Schedule ==
Date	Opponent	Site	Result	Attendance	Source
September 26	at Cornell	Schoellkopf Field; Ithaca, NY (rivalry)	L 7–27	14,000	
October 3	No. 20 Holy Cross	Colgate Athletic Field; Hamilton, NY	L 6–19	6,000	
October 10	at Harvard	Harvard Stadium; Boston, MA	L 26–28	12,000	
October 17	at Dartmouth	Memorial Field; Hanover, NH	W 24–14	12,000	
October 24	at Yale	Yale Bowl; New Haven, CT	T 7–7	25,000	
October 31	at Rutgers	Rutgers Stadium; Piscataway, NJ	W 33–13	7,500	
November 7	Bucknell	Colgate Athletic Field; Hamilton, NY	W 19–12	2,700	
November 14	at Syracuse	Archbold Stadium; Syracuse, NY (rivalry)	L 18–34	37,000	
November 26	at Brown	Brown Stadium; Providence, RI	T 7–7	12,000	
Rankings from AP Poll released prior to the game
