= 1953 Villanova Wildcats football team =

American college football season

1953 Villanova Wildcats football
- Conference: Independent
- Record: 4–6
- Head coach: Art Raimo (3rd season)
- Captain: Joseph Faragelli
- Home stadium: Philadelphia Municipal Stadium, Connie Mack Stadium, Franklin Field

1953 Eastern college football independents records
| | Conf. | | | Overall |
| Team | W | L | T | W | | L | | T |
|---|---|---|---|---|---|---|---|---|
| Westminster (PA) | | – | | 8 | – | 0 | – | 0 |
| Juniata | | – | | 7 | – | 0 | – | 0 |
| No. 14 Army | | – | | 7 | – | 1 | – | 1 |
| Franklin & Marshall | | – | | 5 | – | 2 | – | 0 |
| Hofstra | | – | | 6 | – | 3 | – | 0 |
| Penn State | | – | | 6 | – | 3 | – | 0 |
| Carnegie Tech | | – | | 5 | – | 3 | – | 0 |
| Boston College | | – | | 5 | – | 3 | – | 1 |
| Boston University | | – | | 5 | – | 3 | – | 1 |
| Syracuse | | – | | 5 | – | 3 | – | 1 |
| Tufts | | – | | 4 | – | 3 | – | 0 |
| Holy Cross | | – | | 5 | – | 5 | – | 0 |
| Temple | | – | | 4 | – | 4 | – | 1 |
| Colgate | | – | | 3 | – | 4 | – | 2 |
| Fordham | | – | | 4 | – | 5 | – | 0 |
| Villanova | | – | | 4 | – | 6 | – | 0 |
| Drexel | | – | | 2 | – | 3 | – | 1 |
| Pittsburgh | | – | | 3 | – | 5 | – | 1 |
| Buffalo | | – | | 1 | – | 5 | – | 1 |
| Bucknell | | – | | 1 | – | 8 | – | 0 |
Rankings from AP Poll

The 1953 Villanova Wildcats football team represented the Villanova University during the 1953 college football season. The head coach was Art Raimo, coaching his third season with the Wildcats. The team played their home games at Villanova Stadium in Villanova, Pennsylvania.

== Schedule ==
| Date | Time | Opponent | Site | Result | Attendance | Source |
|---|---|---|---|---|---|---|
| September 19 | | Georgia | Philadelphia Municipal Stadium; Philadelphia, PA | L 19–32 | 97,802–98,000 | |
| September 26 | | at No. 11 Texas | Memorial Stadium; Austin, TX | L 12–41 | 27,000 | |
| October 3 | 2:30 p.m. | vs. Wake Forest | Bowman Gray Stadium; Winston-Salem, NC | L 12–18 | 10,000 | |
| October 10 | | at Boston College | Fenway Park; Boston, MA | W 15–7 | 11,901 | |
| October 17 | | at Detroit | University of Detroit Stadium; Detroit, MI | L 0–27 | 7,815 | |
| October 24 | | at No. 16 Kentucky | McLean Stadium; Lexington, KY | L 0–19 | 30,000 | |
| October 31 | | Xavier^{†} | Connie Mack Stadium; Philadelphia, PA | W 21–14 | 5,610–5,612 | |
| November 14 | | at Boston University | Braves Field; Boston, MA | L 19–31 | 10,944 | |
| November 21 | | Syracuse | Franklin Field; Philadelphia, PA | W 14–13 | 10,146 | |
| November 28 | | at Fordham | Polo Grounds; New York, NY | W 20–13 | 15,330 | |
^{†}Homecoming; Rankings from AP Poll released prior to the game
