= 1953 Buffalo Bulls football team =

American college football season

1953 Buffalo Bulls football
- Conference: Independent
- Record: 1–5–1
- Head coach: Fritz Febel (2nd season)
- Captain: Ray Chamberlin
- Home stadium: Civic Stadium

1953 Eastern college football independents records
	Conf.			Overall
Team	W	L	T	W		L		T
Westminster (PA)		–		8	–	0	–	0
Juniata		–		7	–	0	–	0
No. 14 Army		–		7	–	1	–	1
Franklin & Marshall		–		5	–	2	–	0
Hofstra		–		6	–	3	–	0
Penn State		–		6	–	3	–	0
Carnegie Tech		–		5	–	3	–	0
Boston College		–		5	–	3	–	1
Boston University		–		5	–	3	–	1
Syracuse		–		5	–	3	–	1
Tufts		–		4	–	3	–	0
Holy Cross		–		5	–	5	–	0
Temple		–		4	–	4	–	1
Colgate		–		3	–	4	–	2
Fordham		–		4	–	5	–	0
Villanova		–		4	–	6	–	0
Drexel		–		2	–	3	–	1
Pittsburgh		–		3	–	5	–	1
Buffalo		–		1	–	5	–	1
Bucknell		–		1	–	8	–	0
Rankings from AP Poll

The 1953 Buffalo Bulls football team was an American football team that represented the University of Buffalo as an independent during the 1953 college football season. In their second season under head coach Fritz Febel, the Bulls compiled a 1–5–1 record and were outscored by a total of 181 to 44. The team played its home games at Civic Stadium in Buffalo, New York.

== Schedule ==
Date	Opponent	Site	Result	Attendance	Source
September 26	at Bucknell	Memorial Stadium; Lewisburg, PA	L 6–35		
October 3	Cortland	Civic Stadium; Buffalo, NY	T 12–12	4,000	
October 10	at Lehigh	Taylor Stadium; Bethlehem, PA	L 0–27	7,000	
October 17	Western Reserve^{†}	Civic Stadium; Buffalo, NY	L 6–26	4,823	
October 24	Findlay	Civic Stadium; Buffalo, NY	L 0–34	943	
October 31	at Alfred	Alfred, NY	L 0–47		
November 14	Ohio Northern	Civic Stadium; Buffalo, NY	W 20–0	2,100	
^{†}Homecoming
