= Bill Smaltz =

American football player and coach (1918–2001)

Biographical details
- Born: March 17, 1918; Aliquippa, Pennsylvania, U.S.
- Died: September 14, 2001 (aged 83); Raleigh, North Carolina, U.S.

Playing career
- 1938–1941: Penn State
- 1943: Camp Edwards
- Positions: Fullback, quarterback

Coaching career (HC unless noted)
- 1946: Juniata (assistant)
- 1947–1953: Juniata
- 1954–1970: NC State (assistant)

Head coaching record
- Overall: 32–17–2

William Robert Smaltz Sr. (March 17, 1918 – September 14, 2001) was an American college football player and coach. He served as the head football coach at Juniata College in Huntingdon, Pennsylvania from 1947 to 1953, compiling a 32–17–2 record including an undefeated season in 1953. As a collegiate athlete, he quarterbacked the Penn State Nittany Lions football squad for three seasons and earned a 16th-round selection by the Philadelphia Eagles in the 1942 NFL draft.

Smaltz played as a fullback on the 1943 Camp Edwards Yanks football team.

== Head coaching record ==
Year	Team	Overall	Conference	Standing	Bowl/playoffs
Juniata Indians (Independent) (1947–1953)
1947	Juniata	3–4			
1948	Juniata	4–2–1			
1949	Juniata	5–2			
1950	Juniata	4–4			
1951	Juniata	3–3–1			
1952	Juniata	6–2			
1953	Juniata	7–0			
Juniata:		32–17–2			
Total:		32–17–2			
