= 1953 Juniata Indians football team =

American college football season

1953 Juniata Indians football
- Conference: Independent
- Record: 7–0
- Head coach: Bill Smaltz (7th season)
- Captains: Ron Clapper; Chuck Knox; Tom McNeal; Harry Martin
- Home stadium: College Field

1953 Eastern college football independents records
	Conf.			Overall
Team	W	L	T	W		L		T
Westminster (PA)		–		8	–	0	–	0
Juniata		–		7	–	0	–	0
No. 14 Army		–		7	–	1	–	1
Franklin & Marshall		–		5	–	2	–	0
Hofstra		–		6	–	3	–	0
Penn State		–		6	–	3	–	0
Carnegie Tech		–		5	–	3	–	0
Boston College		–		5	–	3	–	1
Boston University		–		5	–	3	–	1
Syracuse		–		5	–	3	–	1
Tufts		–		4	–	3	–	0
Holy Cross		–		5	–	5	–	0
Temple		–		4	–	4	–	1
Colgate		–		3	–	4	–	2
Fordham		–		4	–	5	–	0
Villanova		–		4	–	6	–	0
Drexel		–		2	–	3	–	1
Pittsburgh		–		3	–	5	–	1
Buffalo		–		1	–	5	–	1
Bucknell		–		1	–	8	–	0
Rankings from AP Poll

The 1953 Juniata Indians football team was an American football team that represented Juniata College as an independent during the 1953 college football season. In their seventh and final year under head coach Bill Smaltz, the Indians compiled a perfect 7–0 record and outscored opponents by a total of 196 to 39. The 1953 season began a seven-year run from 1953 to 1959 during which Juniata compiled a record of 50–2–2, including five undefeated seasons.

The team played its home games at College Field in Huntingdon, Pennsylvania.

== Schedule ==
Date	Opponent	Site	Result	Attendance	Source
October 3	at Moravian	Bethlehem, PA	W 20–6	2,500	
October 10	at Haverford	Haverford, PA	W 27–13		
October 17	at Dickinson	Carlisle, PA	W 43–13	3,500	
October 24	Pennsylvania Military	College Field; Huntingdon, PA	W 24–7		
October 31	Susquehanna^{†}	College Field; Huntingdon, PA	W 39–0		
November 7	Grove City	College Field; Huntingdon, PA	W 22–0		
November 14	Ursinus	College Field; Huntingdon, PA	W 21–0		
^{†}Homecoming
