= 1953 Cornell Big Red football team =

American college football season

1953 Cornell Big Red football
- Conference: Ivy League
- Record: 4–3–2 (3–0–2 Ivy)
- Head coach: George K. James (7th season)
- Captain: Bill George
- Home stadium: Schoellkopf Field

1953 Ivy League football standings
	Conf.					Overall
Team	W		L		T	W		L		T
Cornell	3	–	0	–	2	4	–	3	–	2
Harvard	3	–	2	–	0	6	–	2	–	0
Yale	3	–	2	–	1	5	–	2	–	2
Princeton	3	–	3	–	0	5	–	4	–	0
Columbia	2	–	3	–	0	4	–	5	–	0
Dartmouth	2	–	3	–	0	2	–	7	–	0
Brown	0	–	3	–	0	3	–	5	–	1
Penn	0	–	0	–	1	3	–	5	–	1
The Ivy League in 1953 completed on a league basis in baseball, basketball, hockey, tennis and swimming. In football, there was an agreement among the schools to establish conditions to assure sportsmanship and amateurism. Moreover, newspapers regularly printed football standings for the Ivy League schools.

The 1953 Cornell Big Red football team was an American football team that represented Cornell University during the 1953 college football season. In its seventh season under head coach George K. James, the team compiled a 4–3–2 record but was outscored 152 to 128. Bill George was the team captain.

Cornell was part of the informal Ivy League in 1953. There was no official Ivy League championship recognized in 1953, though Cornell had the best record in games against Ivy opponents (3–0–2) and newspapers referred to Cornell as the Ivy League champion.

Cornell played its home games at Schoellkopf Field in Ithaca, New York.

== Schedule ==
Date	Opponent	Site	Result	Attendance	Source
September 26	Colgate	Schoellkopf Field; Ithaca, NY (rivalry)	W 27–7	14,000	
October 3	No. 14 Rice	Schoellkopf Field; Ithaca, NY	L 7–28	22,000	
October 10	vs. Navy	Municipal Stadium; Baltimore, MD	L 6–26	27,000	
October 17	Yale	Schoellkopf Field; Ithaca, NY	T 0–0	25,000	
October 24	at Princeton	Palmer Stadium; Princeton, NJ	W 26–19	25,000	
October 31	Columbia	Schoellkopf Field; Ithaca, NY (rivalry)	W 27–13	16,000	
November 7	Syracuse	Schoellkopf Field; Ithaca, NY	L 0–26	15,000	
November 14	at Dartmouth	Memorial Field; Hanover, NH (rivalry)	W 28–26	15,000	
November 26	at Penn	Franklin Field; Philadelphia, PA (rivalry)	T 7–7	38,159	
Rankings from AP Poll released prior to the game
