= 1953 Lehigh Engineers football team =

American college football season

1953 Lehigh Engineers football
- Conference: Middle Three Conference
- Record: 4–5 (0–1 Middle Three)
- Head coach: Bill Leckonby (8th season)
- Captain: Thomas Gunn
- Home stadium: Taylor Stadium

1953 Middle Three Conference football standings
	Conf.					Overall
Team	W		L		T	W		L		T
Rutgers $	1	–	0	–	0	2	–	6	–	0
Lafayette	1	–	1	–	0	5	–	4	–	0
Lehigh	0	–	1	–	0	4	–	5	–	0
$ – Conference champion

The 1953 Lehigh Engineers football team was an American football team that represented Lehigh University during the 1953 college football season. Lehigh placed last in the Middle Three Conference.

In their sixth year under head coach Bill Leckonby, the Engineers compiled a 4–5 record. They lost their sole conference game, against Lafayette; for the second straight year, Lehigh did not meet its other conference rival, Rutgers. Thomas Gunn was the team captain.

Lehigh played its home games at Taylor Stadium on the university's main campus in Bethlehem, Pennsylvania.

== Schedule ==
Date	Opponent	Site	Result	Attendance	Source
September 26	at Columbia*	Baker Field; New York, NY	L 7–14	10,000	
October 3	at Delaware*	Delaware Stadium; Newark, DE (rivalry)	L 13–26	4,100	
October 10	Buffalo*	Taylor Stadium; Bethlehem, PA	W 27–0	7,000	
October 17	at Gettysburg*	Musselman Stadium; Gettysburg, PA	L 7–22	5,000	
October 23	at Boston University*	Braves Field; Boston, MA	L 12–52	8,000	
October 31	Bucknell*	Taylor Stadium; Bethlehem, PA	W 20–6		
November 7	Muhlenberg*	Taylor Stadium; Bethlehem, PA	W 13–0	4,500	
November 14	Carnegie Tech*	Taylor Stadium; Bethlehem, PA	W 26–13	7,500	
November 21	Lafayette	Taylor Stadium; Bethlehem, PA (The Rivalry)	L 0–46	14,000	
*Non-conference game
