= 1953 Penn Quakers football team =

American college football season

1953 Penn Quakers football
- Conference: Independent
- Record: 3–5–1
- Head coach: George Munger (15th season)
- Home stadium: Franklin Field

1953 Ivy League football standings
	Conf.					Overall
Team	W		L		T	W		L		T
Cornell	3	–	0	–	2	4	–	3	–	2
Harvard	3	–	2	–	0	6	–	2	–	0
Yale	3	–	2	–	1	5	–	2	–	2
Princeton	3	–	3	–	0	5	–	4	–	0
Columbia	2	–	3	–	0	4	–	5	–	0
Dartmouth	2	–	3	–	0	2	–	7	–	0
Brown	0	–	3	–	0	3	–	5	–	1
Penn	0	–	0	–	1	3	–	5	–	1
The Ivy League in 1953 completed on a league basis in baseball, basketball, hockey, tennis and swimming. In football, there was an agreement among the schools to establish conditions to assure sportsmanship and amateurism. Moreover, newspapers regularly printed football standings for the Ivy League schools.

The 1953 Penn Quakers football team represented the University of Pennsylvania during the 1953 college football season. In head coach George Munger's final season at Penn, the Quakers compiled a 3–5–1 record and were outscored 152 to 96 by their opponents. Although they finished with a losing record, Penn played a tough schedule, opposing four different ranked teams in a row, and defeating No. 10 Navy, 9–6. Their three losses against ranked teams were by a combined 24 points, including a ten-point loss against Notre Dame.

== Schedule ==
Date	Opponent	Rank	Site	Result	Attendance	Source
September 26	Vanderbilt		Franklin Field; Philadelphia, PA	W 13–7	35,000	
October 3	Penn State		Franklin Field; Philadelphia, PA	W 13–7	51,000	
October 10	California	No. 20	Franklin Field; Philadelphia, PA	L 0–40	52,000	
October 17	No. 17 Ohio State		Franklin Field; Philadelphia, PA	L 6–12	44,270	
October 24	No. 10 Navy		Franklin Field; Philadelphia, PA	W 9–6	52,210	
October 31	at No. 16 Michigan		Michigan Stadium; Ann Arbor, MI	L 14–24	57,655	
November 7	No. 1 Notre Dame		Franklin Field; Philadelphia, PA	L 20–28	69,071	
November 14	Army		Franklin Field; Philadelphia, PA	L 14–21	47,305	
November 26	Cornell		Franklin Field; Philadelphia, PA	T 7–7	38,159	
Rankings from AP Poll released prior to the game
