= 1953 Drexel Dragons football team =

American college football season

1953 Drexel Dragons football
- Conference: Independent
- Record: 2–3–1
- Head coach: Eddie Allen (4th season)
- Captains: Ted Rubin; Tom Grebis
- Home stadium: Drexel Field

1953 Eastern college football independents records
	Conf.			Overall
Team	W	L	T	W		L		T
Westminster (PA)		–		8	–	0	–	0
Juniata		–		7	–	0	–	0
No. 14 Army		–		7	–	1	–	1
Franklin & Marshall		–		5	–	2	–	0
Hofstra		–		6	–	3	–	0
Penn State		–		6	–	3	–	0
Carnegie Tech		–		5	–	3	–	0
Boston College		–		5	–	3	–	1
Boston University		–		5	–	3	–	1
Syracuse		–		5	–	3	–	1
Tufts		–		4	–	3	–	0
Holy Cross		–		5	–	5	–	0
Temple		–		4	–	4	–	1
Colgate		–		3	–	4	–	2
Fordham		–		4	–	5	–	0
Villanova		–		4	–	6	–	0
Drexel		–		2	–	3	–	1
Pittsburgh		–		3	–	5	–	1
Buffalo		–		1	–	5	–	1
Bucknell		–		1	–	8	–	0
Rankings from AP Poll

The 1953 Drexel Dragons football team represented the Drexel Institute of Technology (renamed Drexel University in 1970) as an independent during the 1953 college football season. Eddie Allen was the team's head coach.

== Schedule ==
Date	Opponent	Site	Result	Attendance	Source
October 2	at West Chester	Wayne Field; West Chester, PA	L 12–47	4,000	
October 10	Ursinus	Drexel Field; Philadelphia, PA	W 20–6		
October 17	Franklin & Marshall^{†}	Drexel Field; Philadelphia, PA	L 6–33		
October 24	at Randolph–Macon	Ashland, VA	T 7–7		
October 31	Dickinson	Drexel Field; Philadelphia, PA	L 7–13		
November 7	at Western Maryland	Hoffa Field; Westminster, MD	Cancelled (Snow)		
November 14	Swarthmore	Drexel Field; Philadelphia, PA	W 20–6		
^{†}Homecoming

== Roster ==
1953 Drexel Dragons football team roster
Players
Coaches
Offense

Pos.	#	Name	Class
TE		Glazier
OT		Paul VonZech
G		Jim Hart
C	99	Ted Rubin (C)
G	35	Ted Peetros
OT	48	Nels Sugart
TE	19	Leo Hayes	Sr
HB		Tom Grebis (injured) (C)	Sr
HB		Auggie Campiglia
FB		George Piper
QB		George Meyers	Jr
TE	23	Leo O'Connor
TE		Cobano
OT		Joe Kwapinski
G		Boyle
G		Tom Wonderly
HB		Carl Fugmann
FB		Kenny Pastor

Defense

Pos.	#	Name	Class

Special teams

Pos.	#	Name	Class

Head coach

- Eddie Allen (Penn)

Coordinators/assistant coaches

- Tom Miller

Legend

- (C) Team captain
- (S) Suspended
- (I) Ineligible
- Injured
- Redshirt
