= 1953 Brown Bears football team =

American college football season

1953 Brown Bears football
- Conference: Independent
- Record: 3–5–1
- Head coach: Alva Kelley (3rd season)
- Captain: G.E. Haverty
- Home stadium: Brown Stadium

1953 Ivy League football standings
	Conf.					Overall
Team	W		L		T	W		L		T
Cornell	3	–	0	–	2	4	–	3	–	2
Harvard	3	–	2	–	0	6	–	2	–	0
Yale	3	–	2	–	1	5	–	2	–	2
Princeton	3	–	3	–	0	5	–	4	–	0
Columbia	2	–	3	–	0	4	–	5	–	0
Dartmouth	2	–	3	–	0	2	–	7	–	0
Brown	0	–	3	–	0	3	–	5	–	1
Penn	0	–	0	–	1	3	–	5	–	1
The Ivy League in 1953 completed on a league basis in baseball, basketball, hockey, tennis and swimming. In football, there was an agreement among the schools to establish conditions to assure sportsmanship and amateurism. Moreover, newspapers regularly printed football standings for the Ivy League schools.

The 1953 Brown Bears football team was an American football team that represented Brown University as an independent during the 1953 college football season. In their third season under head coach Alva Kelley, the Bears compiled a 3–5–1 record, but outscored their opponents 134 to 127. G.E. Haverty was the team captain. Brown played its home games at Brown Stadium in Providence, Rhode Island.

== Schedule ==
Date	Opponent	Site	Result	Attendance	Source
September 26	Amherst	Brown Stadium; Providence, RI	L 6–7	6,500	
October 3	at Yale	Yale Bowl; New Haven, CT	L 0–13	24,000	
October 10	Rhode Island	Brown Stadium; Providence, RI (rivalry)	L 13–19	8,000	
October 17	at Rutgers	Rutgers Stadium; Piscataway, NJ	W 27–20	7,500	
October 24	Holy Cross	Brown Stadium; Providence, RI	W 6–0	13,000	
October 31	at Princeton	Palmer Stadium; Princeton, NJ	L 13–27	15,000	
November 7	Connecticut	Brown Stadium; Providence, RI	W 42–7	3,000	
November 14	at Harvard	Harvard Stadium; Boston, MA	L 20–27	20,500	
November 26	Colgate	Brown Stadium; Providence, RI	T 7–7	12,000	
