= 1953 Boston College Eagles football team =

American college football season

1953 Boston College Eagles football
- Conference: Independent
- Record: 5–3–1
- Head coach: Mike Holovak (3rd season)
- Captain: Joe Johnson
- Home stadium: Fenway Park

1953 Eastern college football independents records
	Conf.			Overall
Team	W	L	T	W		L		T
Westminster (PA)		–		8	–	0	–	0
Juniata		–		7	–	0	–	0
No. 14 Army		–		7	–	1	–	1
Franklin & Marshall		–		5	–	2	–	0
Hofstra		–		6	–	3	–	0
Penn State		–		6	–	3	–	0
Carnegie Tech		–		5	–	3	–	0
Boston College		–		5	–	3	–	1
Boston University		–		5	–	3	–	1
Syracuse		–		5	–	3	–	1
Tufts		–		4	–	3	–	0
Holy Cross		–		5	–	5	–	0
Temple		–		4	–	4	–	1
Colgate		–		3	–	4	–	2
Fordham		–		4	–	5	–	0
Villanova		–		4	–	6	–	0
Drexel		–		2	–	3	–	1
Pittsburgh		–		3	–	5	–	1
Buffalo		–		1	–	5	–	1
Bucknell		–		1	–	8	–	0
Rankings from AP Poll

The 1953 Boston College Eagles football team represented Boston College as an independent during the 1953 college football season. Led by third-year head coach Mike Holovak, the Eagles compiled a record of 5–3–1. Boston College played home games at Fenway Park in Boston, Massachusetts.

== Schedule ==
Date	Opponent	Site	Result	Attendance	Source
September 26	Clemson	Fenway Park; Boston, MA (rivalry)	T 14–14	10,960	
October 3	at No. 19 LSU	Tiger Stadium; Baton Rouge, LA	L 6–42	25,000	
October 11	Villanova	Fenway Park; Boston, MA	L 7–15	11,901	
October 16	at Fordham	Polo Grounds; New York, NY	W 20–13	20,760	
October 25	at Xavier	Corcoran Stadium; Cincinnati, OH	W 31–14	10,000	
October 31	Richmond	Fenway Park; Boston, MA	L 0–14	6,167	
November 7	Wake Forest	Fenway Park; Boston, MA	W 20–7	3,273	
November 15	Detroit	Fenway Park; Boston, MA	W 33–20	7,628	
November 28	Holy Cross	Fenway Park; Boston, MA (rivalry)	W 6–0	37,000	
Rankings from AP Poll released prior to the game
