= 1949 Lehigh Engineers football team =

American college football season

1949 Lehigh Engineers football
- Conference: Middle Three Conference
- Record: 6–3 (0–2 Middle Three)
- Head coach: Bill Leckonby (4th season)
- Captain: Bob Numbers
- Home stadium: Taylor Stadium

1949 Middle Three Conference football standings
	Conf.					Overall
Team	W		L		T	W		L		T
Rutgers $	2	–	0	–	0	6	–	3	–	0
Lafayette	1	–	1	–	0	2	–	6	–	0
Lehigh	0	–	2	–	0	6	–	3	–	0
$ – Conference champion

The 1949 Lehigh Engineers football team was an American football team that represented Lehigh University as an independent during the 1949 college football season. Lehigh finished last in the Middle Three Conference. In their fourth year under head coach Bill Leckonby, the Engineers compiled a 6–3 record, 0–2 against conference opponents. Bob Numbers was the team captain. Lehigh played home games at Taylor Stadium in Bethlehem, Pennsylvania.

== Schedule ==
Date	Opponent	Site	Result	Attendance	Source
September 24	Franklin & Marshall*	Taylor Stadium; Bethlehem, PA	W 53–0	9,000	
October 1	Case Tech*	Taylor Stadium; Bethlehem, PA	W 39–7	8,000	
October 8	at Rutgers	Rutgers Stadium; Piscataway, NJ	L 27–40	14,500	
October 15	at Gettysburg*	Musselman Stadium; Gettysburg, PA	W 33–20	3,500	
October 22	at Brown*	Brown Stadium; Providence, RI	L 0–48	10,000	
October 29	NYU*	Taylor Stadium; Bethlehem, PA	W 21–6	9,000	
November 5	Muhlenberg*	Taylor Stadium; Bethlehem, PA	W 22–20	9,500	
November 12	at Carnegie Tech*	Forbes Field; Pittsburgh, PA	W 48–20	7,500	
November 19	Lafayette	Liberty High School Stadium; Bethlehem, PA (The Rivalry)	L 12–21	17,000	
*Non-conference game
