= 1953 Columbia Lions football team =

American college football season

1953 Columbia Lions football
- Conference: Independent
- Record: 4–5
- Head coach: Lou Little (24th season)
- Captain: Gene Wodeshick
- Home stadium: Baker Field

1953 Ivy League football standings
	Conf.					Overall
Team	W		L		T	W		L		T
Cornell	3	–	0	–	2	4	–	3	–	2
Harvard	3	–	2	–	0	6	–	2	–	0
Yale	3	–	2	–	1	5	–	2	–	2
Princeton	3	–	3	–	0	5	–	4	–	0
Columbia	2	–	3	–	0	4	–	5	–	0
Dartmouth	2	–	3	–	0	2	–	7	–	0
Brown	0	–	3	–	0	3	–	5	–	1
Penn	0	–	0	–	1	3	–	5	–	1
The Ivy League in 1953 completed on a league basis in baseball, basketball, hockey, tennis and swimming. In football, there was an agreement among the schools to establish conditions to assure sportsmanship and amateurism. Moreover, newspapers regularly printed football standings for the Ivy League schools.

The 1953 Columbia Lions football team was an American football team that represented Columbia University as an independent during the 1953 college football season.

In their 24th season under head coach Lou Little, the Lions compiled a 4–5 record, and were outscored 153 to 124. Gene Wodeshick was the team captain.

Columbia played its home games at Baker Field in Upper Manhattan, in New York City.

== Schedule ==
Date	Opponent	Site	Result	Attendance	Source
September 26	Lehigh	Baker Field; New York, NY	W 14–7	10,000	
October 3	at Princeton	Palmer Stadium; Princeton, NJ	L 19–20	17,500	
October 10	at Yale	Yale Bowl; New Haven, CT	L 7–13	28,000	
October 17	Harvard^{†}	Baker Field; New York, NY	W 6–0	20,000	
October 24	at Army	Michie Stadium; West Point, NY	L 7–40	23,520	
October 31	at Cornell	Schoellkopf Field; Ithaca, NY (rivalry)	L 13–27	16,000	
November 7	Dartmouth	Baker Field; New York, NY	W 25–19	5,000	
November 14	Navy	Baker Field; New York, NY	L 6–14	20,000	
November 21	Rutgers	Baker Field; New York, NY	W 27–13	12,000	
^{†}Homecoming
