= Fritz Febel =

German-American football player and coach

Biographical details
- Born: November 3, 1909; Crvenka, Yugoslavia
- Died: September 21, 1969 (aged 59); Buffalo, New York, U.S.

Playing career
- 1932–1933: Purdue
- Position: Guard

Coaching career (HC unless noted)
- 1936–1942: Buffalo (assistant)
- 1952–1954: Buffalo

Head coaching record
- Overall: 4–19–1

Accomplishments and honors

Awards
- Second-team All-Big Ten (1933)

Friedrich "Fritz" Febel (November 3, 1909 – September 21, 1969) was a German-American college football player and coach. He served as the head football coach at the University of Buffalo from 1952 to 1954, compiling a record of 4–19–1. Febel was an assistant football coach at Buffalo from 1936 to 1942. In 1946 he became an assistant professor of health, physical education, and recreations at the school.

Febel was born into an ethnic German family in Crvenka, Yugoslavia (now Serbia) and immigrated to the United States when he was 12. He became an all-star player for Lindblom High School in Chicago and Purdue University. In January 1935, he graduated from Purdue University with a B. S. degree. He died at Millard Fillmore Hospital in Buffalo, New York after suffering a heart attack.

== Head coaching record ==
Year	Team	Overall	Conference	Standing	Bowl/playoffs
Buffalo Bulls (Independent) (1952–1954)
1952	Buffalo	1–7			
1953	Buffalo	1–5–1			
1954	Buffalo	2–7			
Buffalo:		4–19–1			
Total:		4–19–1			
