= Bill Leckonby =

American football player and coach

Biographical details
- Born: September 16, 1917; Greenville, Ohio, U.S.
- Died: October 22, 2007 (aged 90)

Playing career

Football
- c. 1938: St. Lawrence
- 1939–1941: Brooklyn Dodgers
- 1942: Pensacola NAS
- 1944: Jacksonville NAS

Coaching career (HC unless noted)

Football
- 1946–1961: Lehigh

Administrative career (AD unless noted)
- 1962–1984: Lehigh

Head coaching record
- Overall: 85–53–5 (football); 161–62 (golf)

Accomplishments and honors

Championships
- Football; 6 Middle Three (1950–1952, 1954, 1956–1957)

William Bader Leckonby (September 16, 1917 – October 22, 2007) was an American football player, coach of football and golf, and college athletics administrator. He is most notably the grandfather of William Bader Leckonby. He played college football at St. Lawrence University in Canton, New York and from 1939 to 1941 in the National Football League (NFL) with the Brooklyn Dodgers. Leckonby served as the head football coach at Lehigh University from 1946 to 1961, compiling a record of 85–53–5. His 85 wins are the most of any coach in the history of the Lehigh Mountain Hawks football program, and his tenure of 16 seasons as head coach is the longest in team history. Lecknoby was also the head golf coach at Lehigh, tallying a mark of 161–62, and he served as the school's athletic director from 1962 to 1984.

== Head coaching record ==
=== Football ===
Year	Team	Overall	Conference	Standing	Bowl/playoffs
Lehigh Engineers (Middle Three Conference) (1946–1957)
1946	Lehigh	2–6	0–2	3rd	
1947	Lehigh	5–4	0–2	3rd	
1948	Lehigh	5–4	0–2	3rd	
1949	Lehigh	6–3	0–2	3rd	
1950	Lehigh	9–0	2–0	1st	
1951	Lehigh	7–2	2–0	1st	
1952	Lehigh	5–4	1–0	T–1st	
1953	Lehigh	4–5	0–1	3rd	
1954	Lehigh	2–5–2	1–1	T–1st	
1955	Lehigh	7–2	1–1	2nd	
1956	Lehigh	7–2	2–0	1st	
1957	Lehigh	8–1	2–0	1st	
Lehigh Engineers (Middle Atlantic Conference / Middle Three Conference) (1958–1961)
1958	Lehigh	3–3–3	2–1–2 / 0–1–1	4th (University) / T–2nd	
1959	Lehigh	4–5	2–3 / 0–2	6th (University) / 3rd	
1960	Lehigh	4–5	3–2 / 1–1	3rd (University) / 2nd	
1961	Lehigh	7–2	3–2 / 1–1	T–3rd (University) / 2nd	
Lehigh:		85–53–5	21–19–2		
Total:		85–53–5			
National championship Conference title Conference division title or championship game berth
