= 1953 college football rankings =

- Season: 1953
- Bowl season: 1953–54 bowl games
- Preseason No. 1: Notre Dame
- End of season champions: Maryland

Two human polls comprised the 1953 college football rankings. Unlike most sports, college football's governing body, the NCAA, does not bestow a national championship, instead that title is bestowed by one or more different polling agencies. There are two main weekly polls that begin in the preseason—the AP Poll and the Coaches Poll.

== Legend ==
	Increase in ranking
	Decrease in ranking
	Not ranked previous week
	National champion
(#–#)	Win–loss record
(Italics)	Number of first place votes
т	Tied with team above or below also with this symbol

== AP Poll ==
The final AP Poll was released on November 30, at the end of the 1953 regular season, weeks before the major bowls. The AP would not release a post-bowl season final poll regularly until 1968.

	Preseason Aug	Week 1 Sep 28	Week 2 Oct 5	Week 3 Oct 12	Week 4 Oct 19	Week 5 Oct 26	Week 6 Nov 2	Week 7 Nov 9	Week 8 Nov 16	Week 9 Nov 23	Week 10 (Final) Nov 30	
1.	Notre Dame (84)	Notre Dame (1–0) (71)	Notre Dame (2–0) (84)	Notre Dame (2–0) (74)	Notre Dame (3–0) (51)	Notre Dame (4–0) (82)	Notre Dame (5–0) (90)	Notre Dame (6–0) (79)	Notre Dame (7–0) (93)	Maryland (10–0) (154)	Maryland (10–0) (187)	1.
2.	Michigan State (24)	Michigan State (1–0) (6)	Michigan State (2–0) (15)	Michigan State (3–0) (14)	Michigan State (4–0) (31)	Maryland (6–0) (18)	Maryland (7–0) (21)	Maryland (8–0) (24)	Maryland (9–0) (42)	Notre Dame (7–0–1) (47)	Notre Dame (8–0–1) (141)	2.
3.	Georgia Tech (24)	Maryland (2–0) (5)	Ohio State (2–0) (11)	Maryland (4–0) (21)	Maryland (5–0) (27)	Baylor (5–0) (2)	Baylor (6–0) (7)	Illinois (6–0–1) (4)	Michigan State (7–1) (3)	Michigan State (8–1) (8)	Michigan State (8–1) (8)	3.
4.	UCLA (12)	Michigan (1–0) (3)	Maryland (3–0) (8)	UCLA (4–0) (8)	Georgia Tech (4–0–1) (3)	Illinois (4–0–1)	Illinois (5–0–1)	Michigan State (6–1) (1)	Oklahoma (6–1–1) (3)	Oklahoma (7–1–1) (9)	Oklahoma (8–1–1) (10)	4.
5.	Alabama (18)	UCLA (2–0) (3)	Michigan (2–0) (4)	Michigan (3–0)	Michigan (4–0)	West Virginia (5–0) (15)	Michigan State (5–1)	Georgia Tech (6–1–1)	UCLA (7–1)	UCLA (8–1) (4)	UCLA (8–1) (1)	5.
6.	Oklahoma (3)	Ohio State (1–0) (2)	UCLA (3–0) (2)	Georgia Tech (3–0–1)	Baylor (4–0) (1)	Michigan State (4–1)	Georgia Tech (5–1–1)	Oklahoma (5–1–1) (1)	Texas (6–3)	Illinois (7–1–1)	Rice (8–2) (2)	6.
7.	Ohio State (3)	USC (2–0) (1)	USC (3–0) (2)	Duke (4–0) (3)	Illinois (3–0–1) (1)	USC (5–0–1)	West Virginia (6–0) (10)	UCLA (6–1)	Illinois (6–1–1)	Texas (6–3)	Illinois (7–1–1)	7.
8.	USC	Oklahoma (0–1)	Duke (3–0) (4)	Baylor (3–0)	West Virginia (4–0) (12)	Georgia Tech (4–1–1)	Oklahoma (4–1–1) (1)	West Virginia (7–0) (11)	Wisconsin (6–2) (2)	Rice (7–2)	Georgia Tech (7–2–1)	8.
9.	Maryland (1)	Georgia Tech (1–0–1)	Baylor (2–0)	Illinois (2–0–1)	Oklahoma (2–1–1)	Oklahoma (3–1–1) (1)	UCLA (6–1) (1)	Baylor (6–1)	USC (6–1–1)	Iowa (5–3–1) (6)	Iowa (5–3–1) (10)	9.
10.	Duke (2)	Baylor (1–0)	Georgia Tech (2–0–1)	West Virginia (3–0) (9)	Navy (3–0–1)	UCLA (5–1) (1)	Duke (6–1)	Texas (5–3)	Rice (6–2)	Georgia Tech (7–2–1)	West Virginia (8–1) (14)	10.
11.	Texas	Mississippi State (2–0) (1)	Rice (2–0)	Rice (3–0)	USC (4–0–1)	SMU (3–1)	Stanford (5–2) (1)	Ole Miss (7–1) (2)	Alabama (5–1–3) (1)	West Virginia (8–1) (17)	Texas (7–3)	11.
12.	Rice	Duke (2–0) (1)	West Virginia (2–0) (5)	Oklahoma (1–1–1) (1)	UCLA (4–1)	Rice (4–1)	Ole Miss (6–1) (1)	USC (6–1–1)	Georgia Tech (6–2–1)	Wisconsin (6–2–1)	Texas Tech (10–1)	12.
13.	Navy	West Virginia (1–0) (4)	Mississippi State (3–0) (3)	USC (3–0–1)	SMU (2–1)	Duke (5–1)	Minnesota (3–3)	Kentucky (5–2–1) (1)	Kentucky (6–2–1) (3)	Kentucky (7–2–1) (5)	Alabama (6–2–3) (1)	13.
14.	California	Rice (1–0)	LSU (2–0–1)	Navy (2–0–1)	LSU (3–0–2)	Minnesota (2–3)	Kentucky (4–2–1)	Duke (6–1–1)	Auburn (6–1–1) (1)	Texas Tech (9–1)	Army (7–1–1)	14.
15.	Florida	Ole Miss (2–0)	Texas (2–1)	Pittsburgh (1–1–1)	Texas A&M (4–0–1) (1)	Army (4–1)	Auburn (4–1–1)	Minnesota (4–3)	Duke (6–1–1)	South Carolina (7–2)	Wisconsin (6–2–1)	15.
16.	West Virginia	Wisconsin (1–0)	Oklahoma (0–1–1)	California (3–1)	Duke (4–1) т	Michigan (4–1) (1)	Ohio State (5–1)	Rice (5–2) т	Stanford (6–3)	Auburn (7–1–1) (1)	Kentucky (7–2–1) (3)	16.
17.	Pittsburgh т	Texas (1–1)	Pittsburgh (0–1–1)	Ohio State (2–1) т	Kentucky (2–2–1) т	Stanford (4–2)	Michigan (5–1) т	Stanford (5–3) т	Texas Tech (8–1)	Baylor (7–2)	Auburn (7–2–1)	17.
18.	Tennessee т	Georgia (2–0)	Northwestern (2–0)	Mississippi Southern (4–0) (1) т	Pittsburgh (1–2–1)	Ole Miss (5–1)	USC (5–1–1) т	Tennessee (4–2–1)	South Carolina (6–2)	Army (6–1–1)	Duke (7–2–1)	18.
19.	Princeton	LSU (1–0–1)	Holy Cross (2–0)	Auburn (2–0–1)	Mississippi Southern (5–0)	Kentucky (3–2–1)	Texas (4–3)	Texas Tech (7–1)	West Virginia (7–1) (1)	Stanford (6–3–1)	Stanford (6–3–1)	19.
20.	Baylor	Holy Cross (1–0)	Penn (2–0) т; Mississippi Southern (3–0) т	Mississippi State (3–0–1)	Stanford (3–2)	Navy (3–1–1)	Alabama (3–1–3)	Auburn (5–1–1)	Iowa (5–3) (1)	USC (6–2–1)	Michigan (6–3) (1)	20.
	Preseason Aug	Week 1 Sep 28	Week 2 Oct 5	Week 3 Oct 12	Week 4 Oct 19	Week 5 Oct 26	Week 6 Nov 2	Week 7 Nov 9	Week 8 Nov 16	Week 9 Nov 23	Week 10 (Final) Nov 30	
		Dropped: Alabama; California; Florida; Navy; Pittsburgh; Princeton; Tennessee	Dropped: Georgia; Ole Miss; Wisconsin	Dropped: Holy Cross; LSU; Northwestern; Penn; Texas	Dropped: Auburn; California; Mississippi State; Ohio State; Rice	Dropped: LSU; Pittsburgh; Mississippi Southern; Texas A&M	Dropped: Army; Navy; Rice; SMU	Dropped: Alabama; Michigan; Ohio State	Dropped: Baylor; Minnesota; Ole Miss; Tennessee	Dropped: Alabama; Duke	Dropped: Baylor; South Carolina; USC	

== United Press Coaches Poll ==
The final United Press (UP) Coaches Poll was released prior to the bowl games, on November 30.
Maryland received 20 of the 35 first-place votes; Notre Dame received thirteen, and one each went to Michigan State and UCLA.

Ranking	Team	Conference	Bowl
1	Maryland	ACC	Lost Orange, 0–7
2	Notre Dame	Independent	none
3	Michigan State	Big Ten	Won Rose, 28–20
4	UCLA	Pacific Coast	Lost Rose, 20–28
5	Oklahoma	Big Seven	Won Orange, 7–0
6	Rice	Southwest	Won Cotton, 28–6
7	Illinois	Big Ten	none
8	Texas	Southwest	none
9	Georgia Tech	SEC	Won Sugar, 42–19
10	Iowa	Big Ten	none
11	Alabama	SEC	Lost Cotton, 6–26
12	Texas Tech	Border	Won Gator, 35–13
13	West Virginia	Southern	Lost Sugar, 19–42
14	Wisconsin	Big Ten	none
15	Kentucky	SEC	none
16	Army	Independent	none
17	Stanford	Pacific Coast	none
18	Duke	ACC	none
19	Michigan	Big Ten	none
20	Ohio State	Big Ten	none

- Prior to the 1975 season, the Big Ten and Pacific Coast (later AAWU / Pac-8) conferences allowed only one postseason participant each, for the Rose Bowl.

== Litkenhous Ratings ==
The Litkenhous Ratings released in mid-December 1953 provided numerical rankings to over 683 college football programs. The top 120 ranked teams were:

1. Notre Dame (9–0–1) - 110.4
2. Maryland (10–1) - 108.5
3. Oklahoma (9-1-1) - 107.3
4. Rice (9–2) - 106.8
5. Michigan State (9–1) - 103.9
6. Wisconsin (6–2–1) - 103.7
7. Iowa (5–3–1) - 103.4
8. UCLA (8–2) - 102.8
9. Illinois (7–1–1) - 102.5
10. Texas Tech (11–1) - 101.7
11. Ole Miss (7–2–1) - 100.9
12. Michigan (6–3) - 100.3
13. Texas (7–3) - 99.4
14. Georgia Tech (9–2–1) - 98.9
15. Kentucky (7–2–1) - 98.2
16. Auburn (7–3–1) - 97.7
17. Mississippi State (5–2–3) - 97.1
18. Baylor (7–3) - 97.1
19. Ohio State (6–3) - 96.0
20. West Virginia (8–2) - 94.9
21. SMU (5-5) - 94.7
22. Minnesota (4–4–1) - 94.5
23. LSU (5–3–3) - 94.3
24. Marquette (6–3–1) - 94.0
25. Florida (3–5–2) - 93.9
26. Stanford (6–3–1) - 93.8
27. Penn State (6–3) - 93.6
28. Duke (7–2–1) - 93.5
29. California (4–4–2) - 92.2
30. Cincinnati (9–1) - 92.2
31. Alabama (6–3–3) - 92.1
32. Miami (FL) (4–5) - 92.1
33. Army (7–1–1) - 91.9
34. USC (6–3–1) - 91.9
35. Syracuse (5–3–1) - 91.8
36. Tennessee (6–4–1) - 91.3
37. Missouri (6–4) - 90.2
38. Navy (4–3–2) - 89.6
39. Purdue (2–7) - 89.5
40. TCU (3–7) - 89.5
41. Arkansas (3–7) - 89.2
42. Texas A&M (4–5–1) - 89.0
43. Oklahoma A&M (7–3) - 88.2
44. Houston (4–4–1) - 88.1
45. Northwestern (3–6) - 88.1
46. Kansas State (6–3–1) - 87.8
47. Miami (OH) (7–1–1) - 87.4
48. Pittsburgh (3–5–1) - 86.7
49. Detroit (6–4) - 85.6
50. Penn (3–5–1) - 85.2
51. Fordham (4–5) - 85.0
52. Colorado (6–4) - 84.2
53. Boston University (5–3–1) - 83.8
54. South Carolina (7–3) - 83.8
55. East Texas (10–0–1) - 83.6
56. Indiana (2–7) - 82.9
57. Mississippi Southern (9–2) - 82.6
58. Arizona (4–5–1) - 82.5
59. Utah (8–2) - 82.2
60. Nebraska (3–6–1) - 81.7
61. Oregon (4–5–1) - 81.2
62. Washington (3–6–1) - 81.2
63. Wyoming (5–4–1) - 81.2
64. Georgia (3–8) - 81.1
65. Tulane (1–8–1) - 80.6
66. Holy Cross (5-5) - 80.4
67. Kansas (2–8) - 79.9
68. North Carolina (4–6) - 79.6
69. Pacific (4–4–2) - 77.6
70. Texas Western (8–2) - 77.5
. Trinity (TX) (8–1) - 76.4
71. Boston College (5–3–1) - 76.1
. Wichita (4–4–1) - 75.9
72. Utah State (8–3) - 75.6
73. Clemson (3–5–1) - 75.3
. Cal. P.N. - 75.2
. Colorado A&M (4–5) - 75.2
74. Villanova (4–6) - 74.6
75. Washington State (4–6) - 74.6
. Tyler JC - 74.4
76. Harvard (6–2) - 73.8
77. Hardin–Simmons (6–5) - 73.6
. Pasadena CC - 73.5
. North Texas (3–6–1) - 73.1
78. Vanderbilt (3–7) - 72.8
79. Cornell (4–3–2) - 72.6
80. Tulsa (3–7) - 72.2
81. Delaware (7–1) - 72.0
82. Arizona State (4–5–1) - 71.7
83. Yale (5–2–2) - 70.9
84. New Mexico (5–3–1) - 70.7
85. Ohio (6–2–1) - 70.7
86. Colgate (3–4–2) - 70.6
87. Oregon State (3–6) - 69.9
88. Columbia (4–5) - 69.8
. Sam Houston (9–1) - 69.8
. Memphis State (6–4) - 69.6
89. Iowa State (2–7) - 69.5
90. Chattanooga (3–7) - 69.3
91. Dartmouth (2–7) - 69.3
92. Wake Forest
93. Arkansas State
94. College of Idaho
95. Princeton
96. Valparaiso
97. Rutgers
98. Maine
99. Butler
100. Virginia
101. Wabash
102. NC State
103. New Hampshire
104. Idaho
105.
106. North Dakota
107. Ball State
108. Indiana State
109. Carnegie Tech
110. Evansville

== HBCU rankings ==
The Pittsburgh Courier, a leading African American newspaper, ranked the top 1953 teams from historically black colleges and universities in an era when college football was largely segregated. The rankings were published on December 19:

1. Prairie View A&M (12–0)
2. Florida A&M (10–1)
3. Tennessee A&I (8–0–1)
4. Lincoln (MO) (8–0–1)
5. Maryland State (7–1)
6. Southern (9–2)
7. North Carolina College (5–3)
8. Virginia State (5–3–1)
9. Morgan State (6–2)
10. Texas Southern (7–3)
11. West Virginia State (6–3)
12. Grambling (8–2)

The Associated Negro Press also published rankings on December 25:

1. Prairie View A&M (12–0)
2. Tennessee A&I (8–0–1)
3. Lincoln (MO) (8–0–1)
4. Florida A&M (10–1)
5. Southern (9–2)
6. Maryland State (7–1)
7. North Carolina College (5–3)
8. Virginia State (5–3–1)
9. Texas Southern (7–3)
10. South Carolina State (6–3)

== See also ==
- 1953 College Football All-America Team
