= 1953 Alabama Crimson Tide football team =

American college football season

1953 Alabama Crimson Tide football

SEC champion

Cotton Bowl Classic, L 6–28 vs. Rice
- Conference: Southeastern Conference

Ranking
- Coaches: No. 11
- AP: No. 13
- Record: 6–3–3 (4–0–3 SEC)
- Head coach: Harold Drew (7th season)
- Captain: Bud Willis
- Home stadium: Denny Stadium; Legion Field; Ladd Stadium; Cramton Bowl

1953 Southeastern Conference football standings
	Conf.					Overall
Team	W		L		T	W		L		T
No. 13 Alabama $	4	–	0	–	3	6	–	3	–	3
No. 8 Georgia Tech	4	–	1	–	1	9	–	2	–	1
No. 16 Kentucky	4	–	1	–	1	7	–	2	–	1
Ole Miss	4	–	1	–	1	7	–	2	–	1
No. 17 Auburn	4	–	2	–	1	7	–	3	–	1
Mississippi State	3	–	1	–	3	5	–	2	–	3
Tennessee	3	–	2	–	1	6	–	4	–	1
LSU	2	–	3	–	3	5	–	3	–	3
Florida	1	–	3	–	2	3	–	5	–	2
Vanderbilt	1	–	5	–	0	3	–	7	–	0
Georgia	1	–	5	–	0	3	–	8	–	0
Tulane	0	–	7	–	0	1	–	8	–	1
$ – Conference champion; Rankings from AP Poll

The 1953 Alabama Crimson Tide football team (variously "Alabama", "UA" or "Bama") represented the University of Alabama in the 1953 college football season. It was the Crimson Tide's 59th overall and 20th season as a member of the Southeastern Conference (SEC). The team was led by head coach Harold Drew, in his seventh year, and played their home games at Denny Stadium in Tuscaloosa, Legion Field in Birmingham, Ladd Stadium in Mobile and at the Cramton Bowl in Montgomery, Alabama. They finished with a record of six wins, three losses and three ties (6–3–3 overall, 4–0–3 in the SEC), as SEC Champions and with a loss against Rice in the Cotton Bowl Classic.

1953 was one of the more unusual seasons in Alabama history. After they opened the season as the preseason No. 5 team, the Crimson Tide lost to Mississippi Southern and tied LSU before they had their first win of the season against Vanderbilt in week three. Alabama won only six games all year, and only four of seven conference games. However, the other three conference games were ties, and a 4–0–3 record was good enough to win Alabama the SEC title. It was Bama's first conference championship since 1945 and last until 1961. For their championship, Alabama accepted an invitation to play in the Cotton Bowl Classic.

In their matchup against Rice one of the strangest plays in the history of college football occurred. In the second quarter, the Owls had the ball on its own five-yard line up 7–6 after they recovered an Alabama fumble. On their first play of the drive, Rice running back Dicky Moegle swept around the right side, broke free, and appeared to be on his way to a 95-yard touchdown run—until Tommy Lewis of Alabama, who was on the sideline, ran into the field of play and tackled Moegle at the Alabama 40. Officials awarded Moegle a 95-yard touchdown run, and Rice won the game 28–6.

== Schedule ==
Date	Opponent	Rank	Site	TV	Result	Attendance
September 18	Mississippi Southern*	No. 5	Cramton Bowl; Montgomery, AL		L 19–25	14,500
September 26	LSU	No. 5	Ladd Stadium; Mobile, AL (rivalry)		T 7–7	33,809
October 3	at Vanderbilt		Dudley Field; Nashville, TN		W 21–12	24,000
October 10	Tulsa*		Denny Stadium; Tuscaloosa, AL		W 41–13	18,000
October 17	Tennessee		Legion Field; Birmingham, AL (Third Saturday in October)	NBC	T 0–0	40,000
October 24	Mississippi State^{†}		Denny Stadium; Tuscaloosa, AL (rivalry)		T 7–7	28,000
October 31	at Georgia		Sanford Stadium; Athens, GA (rivalry)		W 33–12	36,000
November 7	Chattanooga*	No. 20	Denny Stadium; Tuscaloosa, AL		W 21–14	14,000
November 14	No. 5 Georgia Tech		Legion Field; Birmingham, AL (rivalry)		W 13–6	42,530
November 21	at No. 2 Maryland*	No. 11	Byrd Stadium; College Park, MD		L 0–21	36,000
November 28	vs. No. 16 Auburn		Legion Field; Birmingham, AL (Iron Bowl)		W 10–7	44,000
January 1, 1954	vs. No. 6 Rice*	No. 13	Cotton Bowl; Dallas, TX (Cotton Bowl Classic)	CBS	L 6–28	75,504
*Non-conference game; ^{†}Homecoming; Rankings from AP Poll released prior to the game

== Game summaries ==
=== Mississippi Southern ===
Team	1	2	3	4	Total
• Miss Southern	6	6	0	13	25
#5 Alabama	7	12	0	0	19

- Date: September 18
- Location: Cramton Bowl
  Montgomery, AL
- Game attendance: 14,500

To open the 1953 season, Alabama was upset by the Mississippi Southern Southerners 25–19 at the Cramton Bowl on a Friday night. The first touchdown of the game was set up after Jim David recovered a Laurin Pepper fumble at the Southern 43-yards line. Five plays later, Tommy Lewis scored on a short run for a 7–0 Alabama lead. The Eagles responded on their next possession with a three-yard Billy Jarrell touchdown pass to Bucky McElroy and made the score 7–6. In the second quarter each team traded touchdowns with Alabama scoring on a five-yard William Oliver, Southern on a 45-yard Jarrell pass to Pepper and Alabama again on a five-yard Bart Starr pass to Curtis Lynch for a 19–12 Crimson Tide lead at halftime. After a scoreless third, Southern scored a pair of fourth-quarter touchdowns, first on a 66-yard Pepper run and then on 23-yard Jarrell pass to Leonard Williams, and won the game 25–19.

=== LSU ===
Team	1	2	3	4	Total
LSU	7	0	0	0	7
Alabama	7	0	0	0	7

- Date: September 27
- Location: Ladd Stadium
  Mobile, AL
- Game attendance: 33,809

To open conference play for the 1953 season, Alabama played LSU to a 7–7 tie at Ladd Stadium in Mobile. Both of the touchdowns scored in the game were made in the first quarter. The first was scored by Alabama on a two-yard Tommy Lewis run and LSU responded on the drive that ensued with a one-yard George Brancato run for what turned out to be the final points of the game.

=== Vanderbilt ===
Team	1	2	3	4	Total
• Alabama	14	0	7	0	21
Vanderbilt	0	6	0	6	12

- Date: October 3
- Location: Dudley Field
  Nashville, TN
- Game attendance: 24,000

In their first road game of the season, the Crimson Tide defeated the Vanderbilt Commodores by a final score of 21–12 in Nashville for their first win of the season and their first over Vandy since the 1946 season. The Crimson Tide took a 14–0 first quarter lead with a pair of touchdowns scored in just under two minutes. Bobby Luna scored first on a four-yard run and then Bart Starr threw a 43-yard touchdown pass to Bud Willis. Vanderbilt then cut the lead to 14–6 at halftime after they scored on a five-yard Floyd Teas touchdown run late in the second quarter. In the second half, the Crimson Tide scored in the third on a 30-yard Starr pass to Joe Cummings and the Commodores scored in the fourth on a three-yard Daniel Byers run and made the final score 21–12.

=== Tulsa ===
Team	1	2	3	4	Total
Tulsa	0	0	0	13	13
• Alabama	0	20	14	7	41

- Date: October 10
- Location: Denny Stadium
  Tuscaloosa, AL
- Game attendance: 18,000

In the first all-time meeting between the schools, Alabama defeated the Tulsa Golden Hurricane 41–13 in the first Denny Stadium game of the season. After a scoreless first quarter, Alabama touchdowns on an 11-yard William Oliver run, a 63-yard Thomas Tharp run and a 56-yard Bobby Luna interception return for a 20–0 Crimson Tide lead at halftime. Alabama extended their lead further to 34–0 after third-quarter touchdowns on a 31-yard Bart Starr pass to Bud Willis and on a two-yard William Stone run. Tulsa scored both of their touchdowns in the fourth quarter, first on an eight-yard Bob Bohn pass to Bob Holladay and on an 11-yard Bill Waller run. The Crimson Tide then made the final score 41–13 when Hootie Ingram scored on a one-yard run with just under a minute left in the game.

=== Tennessee ===
Third Saturday in October

Team	1	2	3	4	Total
Tennessee	0	0	0	0	0
Alabama	0	0	0	0	0

- Date: October 17
- Location: Legion Field
  Birmingham, AL
- Game attendance: 40,000
- Television network: CBS

In their annual rivalry game against the Tennessee Volunteers, Alabama had a chance to defeat the Vols for the first time since 1947, but settled for a scoreless tie after a fumble at the Tennessee five and missed a 43-yard field goal.

=== Mississippi State ===
Team	1	2	3	4	Total
Mississippi State	0	7	0	0	7
Alabama	0	0	7	0	7

- Date: October 24
- Location: Denny Stadium
  Tuscaloosa, AL
- Game attendance: 28,000

On homecoming in Tuscaloosa, the Crimson Tide battled the Mississippi State Maroons to a 7–7 tie at Denny Stadium after a 26-yard Bobby Luna field goal was blocked as time expired. After a three-yard Jackie Parker run gave the Maroons a 7–0 lead in the second, Alabama tied the game on a two-yard Thomas Tharp run in the third quarter.

=== Georgia ===
Team	1	2	3	4	Total
• Alabama	7	6	13	7	33
Georgia	0	12	0	0	12

- Date: October 31
- Location: Sanford Stadium
  Athens, GA
- Game attendance: 36,000

At Sanford Stadium, Alabama defeated the Georgia Bulldogs 33–12 to end a two-game winless streak on homecoming in Athens. The first Crimson Tide touchdown was set up after Thomas Tharp returned a punt 86-yards to the Bulldogs' two-yard line. On the next play, Bart Starr threw a two-yard touchdown pass to Joe Cummings for a 7–0 lead. In the second quarter, Georgia scored all of their points on two-yard Robert Clemens touchdown run and a 28-yard James Harper touchdown pass to James Williams. However, the Crimson Tide scored their second touchdown on a 31-yard Starr pass to Bobby Luna for a 13–12 halftime lead. Alabama then scored three second half touchdowns on a 38-yard Vincent Delaurentis interception return, a 63-yard Tharp run and on a five-yard Starr pass to William Oliver for the 33–12 victory.

=== Chattanooga ===
Team	1	2	3	4	Total
Chattanooga	0	14	0	0	14
• #20 Alabama	7	7	7	0	21

- Date: November 7
- Location: Denny Stadium
  Tuscaloosa, AL
- Game attendance: 14,000

In the final Denny Stadium game of the season, Alabama defeated the Chattanooga Moccasins 21–14. The Crimson Tide took a 7–0 first quarter lead when Bobby Luna scored on a five-yard touchdown run. The teams then traded second-quarter touchdowns for a 14–14 halftime tie. The Moccasins scored first on a 36-yard Dick Durham pass to Bill Wilkerson, then Alabama on a 54-yard Albert Elmore run and finally on a two-yard Billy Carter run. Bart Starr then threw the game-winning touchdown pass to Thomas Tharp in the third quarter for the 21–14 victory.

=== Georgia Tech ===
Team	1	2	3	4	Total
#5 Georgia Tech	0	0	6	0	6
• Alabama	7	0	0	6	13

- Date: November 14
- Location: Legion Field
  Birmingham, AL
- Game attendance: 42,530

Against Georgia Tech, Alabama upset the No. 5 ranked Yellow Jackets 13–6 at Legion Field in Birmingham. The Crimson Tide scored first and took a 7–0 lead on a William Oliver run in the first quarter. After a scoreless second quarter, the Jackets scored their only touchdown on a two-yard Glenn Turner run in the third to cut the Alabama lead to 7–6. Albert Elmore then scored the game-winning touchdown early in the fourth quarter on his short run. The loss was the first for Georgia Tech in conference play since their 54–19 loss to the Crimson Tide in 1950.

=== Maryland ===
Team	1	2	3	4	Total
#11 Alabama	0	0	0	0	0
• #2 Maryland	14	7	0	0	21

- Date: November 21
- Location: Byrd Stadium
  College Park, MD
- Game attendance: 36,000

On the road against the No. 2 ranked Maryland Terrapins, Alabama was shutout 21–0 at Byrd Stadium. On the second play of the game, the Terps took a 7–0 lean on an 81-yard Chet Hanulak touchdown run. Later in the first, Bernie Faloney threw a 51-yard touchdown pass to Bill Walker for a 14–0 lead at the end of the quarter. After Faloney was pulled from the game in the second quarter due to an injury, Charles Boxold threw a 25-yard touchdown pass to Walker to make the final score 21–0.

=== Auburn ===
Iron Bowl

Team	1	2	3	4	Total
#16 Auburn	7	0	0	0	7
• Alabama	0	7	0	3	10

- Date: November 28
- Location: Legion Field
  Birmingham, AL
- Game attendance: 44,000

For the fifth time in six years since the revival of the Auburn series, Alabama defeated the Tigers 10–7 at Legion Field and clinched both the SEC Championship and a berth in the Cotton Bowl Classic. Auburn scored their only touchdown on a two-yard run in the first quarter by Charles Hataway to cap a drive that saw long runs made by both Vince Dooley and Fob James. William Stone then tied the game 7–7 for Alabama in the third quarter with his 15-yard touchdown run. A fourth quarter field goal from 28-yards by Bobby Luna provided for the final 10–7 margin of victory for the Crimson Tide.

=== Rice ===
Cotton Bowl Classic

Team	1	2	3	4	Total
#13 Alabama	6	0	0	0	6
• #6 Rice	0	14	7	7	28

- Date: January 1, 1954
- Location: Cotton Bowl
  Dallas, TX
- Game attendance: 75,504
- Television network: CBS

In their first all-time game against Rice, the Crimson Tide were defeated 28–6 by the Owls in the Cotton Bowl Classic. Alabama took a 6–0 lead after its only touchdown was scored by Tommy Lewis on a two-yard touchdown run in the first quarter. Rice responded with a series of three, of long touchdown runs by Dicky Moegle to take a 21–6 lead into the fourth quarter. His first touchdown came on a 79-yard run on the first play of the second quarter, the second on a 95-yard run and the third on a 37-yard run. The 95-yard touchdown was awarded by the referee after Tommy Lewis left the Alabama sideline, entered the field of play and tackled Moegle at the Alabama 42-yard line. Rice then scored their final touchdown in the fourth quarter on a seven-yard Buddy Grantham run for the 28–6 victory.

== Personnel ==
=== Varsity letter winners ===
Player	Hometown	Position
Ralph Carrigan	Oak Park, Illinois	Center
Ed Culpepper	Bradenton, Florida	Tackle
Joe Cummings	Muleshoe, Texas	End
Tom Danner	Tuscaloosa, Alabama	Guard
Jim Davis	Hamilton, Alabama	Guard
Vincent Delaurentis	Hammonton, New Jersey	Center
Charles Eckerly	Oak Park, Illinois	Guard
Albert Elmore	Troy, Alabama	Quarterback
Hootie Ingram	Tuscaloosa, Alabama	Back
Harry Lee	Birmingham, Alabama	Guard
Bo Collins	Yazoo City, Mississippi	Guard
Tommy Lewis	Greenville, Alabama	Fullback
Bobby Luna	Huntsville, Alabama	Halfback
Curtis Lynch	Wadley, Alabama	End
George Mason	Langdale, Alabama	Tackle
Jefferson Moorer	Evergreen, Alabama	Guard
William Oliver	Panola, Alabama	Halfback
Billy Shipp	Mobile, Alabama	Tackle
Jack Smalley	Tuscaloosa, Alabama	Tackle
John Snoderly	Montgomery, Alabama	Center
Bart Starr	Montgomery, Alabama	Quarterback
William Stone	Yukon, West Virginia	Fullback
Thomas Tharp	Birmingham, Alabama	Halfback
Tommy Tillman	Haleyville, Alabama	End
Bob Wilga	Webster, Massachusetts	Guard
Sid Youngelman	Newark, New Jersey	Tackle

=== Coaching staff ===
Name	Position	Seasons at Alabama	Alma mater
Harold Drew	Head coach	20	Bates (1916)
Lew Bostick	Assistant coach	10	Alabama (1939)
Tilden Campbell	Assistant coach	14	Alabama (1935)
Hank Crisp	Assistant coach	26	VPI (1920)
Joe Kilgrow	Assistant coach	10	Alabama (1937)
Malcolm Laney	Assistant coach	10	Alabama (1932)
James Nisbet	Assistant coach	5	Alabama (1937)
