= 1953 Florida Gators football team =

American college football season

1953 Florida Gators football
- Conference: Southeastern Conference
- Record: 3–5–2 (1–3–2 SEC)
- Head coach: Bob Woodruff (4th season)
- Home stadium: Florida Field

1953 Southeastern Conference football standings
| | Conf. | | | | | Overall |
| Team | W | | L | | T | W | | L | | T |
|---|---|---|---|---|---|---|---|---|---|---|
| No. 13 Alabama $ | 4 | – | 0 | – | 3 | 6 | – | 3 | – | 3 |
| No. 8 Georgia Tech | 4 | – | 1 | – | 1 | 9 | – | 2 | – | 1 |
| No. 16 Kentucky | 4 | – | 1 | – | 1 | 7 | – | 2 | – | 1 |
| Ole Miss | 4 | – | 1 | – | 1 | 7 | – | 2 | – | 1 |
| No. 17 Auburn | 4 | – | 2 | – | 1 | 7 | – | 3 | – | 1 |
| Mississippi State | 3 | – | 1 | – | 3 | 5 | – | 2 | – | 3 |
| Tennessee | 3 | – | 2 | – | 1 | 6 | – | 4 | – | 1 |
| LSU | 2 | – | 3 | – | 3 | 5 | – | 3 | – | 3 |
| Florida | 1 | – | 3 | – | 2 | 3 | – | 5 | – | 2 |
| Vanderbilt | 1 | – | 5 | – | 0 | 3 | – | 7 | – | 0 |
| Georgia | 1 | – | 5 | – | 0 | 3 | – | 8 | – | 0 |
| Tulane | 0 | – | 7 | – | 0 | 1 | – | 8 | – | 1 |
$ – Conference champion; Rankings from AP Poll

The 1953 Florida Gators football team represented the University of Florida during the 1953 college football season. The season was the fourth for Bob Woodruff as the head coach of the Florida Gators football team. The 1953 season was a year of rebuilding and backsliding after the graduation of All-American Charlie LaPradd and the loss of star back Rick Casares to the U.S. Army. The squad's lack of quality depth was further exacerbated by the NCAA's reintroduction of restrictive substitution rules which limited use of the two-platoon system, requiring players to play both offense and defense. Florida came into the season with few players who could effectively play both ways, so Coach Woodruff choose to use his best defensive players on the first team and run a conservative ball-control offense.

The highlight of the season was the Gators' second consecutive victory over the Georgia Bulldogs, but the Gators began a pattern of agonizingly close losses to the Rice Owls (20–16), Auburn Tigers (16–7), Tennessee Volunteers (9–7) and Miami Hurricanes (14–10), as well as two ties with the Georgia Tech Yellow Jackets (0–0) and LSU Tigers (21–21). Woodruff's 1953 Florida Gators finished with a 3–5–2 overall record and a 1–3–2 record in the Southeastern Conference (SEC), placing ninth of twelve SEC teams.

== Schedule ==
| Date | Opponent | Rank | Site | Result | Attendance | Source |
|---|---|---|---|---|---|---|
| September 19 | at No. 12 Rice* | No. 15 | Rice Stadium; Houston, TX | L 16–20 | 55,000 | |
| September 26 | No. 3 Georgia Tech | | Florida Field; Gainesville, FL | T 0–0 | 41,000 | |
| October 3 | at Kentucky | | McLean Stadium; Lexington, KY (rivalry) | L 13–26 | | |
| October 10 | Stetson* | | Florida Field; Gainesville, FL | W 45–0 | 18,000 | |
| October 17 | vs. The Citadel* | | Gator Bowl Stadium; Jacksonville, FL | W 60–0 | 15,000 | |
| October 24 | No. 14 LSU^{†} | | Florida Field; Gainesville, FL (rivalry) | T 21–21 | 39,000 | |
| October 31 | at Auburn | | Cliff Hare Stadium; Auburn, AL (rivalry) | L 7–16 | 25,500 | |
| November 7 | vs. Georgia | | Gator Bowl Stadium; Jacksonville, FL (rivalry) | W 21–7 | 36,000 | |
| November 14 | No. 18 Tennessee | | Florida Field; Gainesville, FL (rivalry) | L 7–9 | 29,000 | |
| November 28 | at Miami (FL)* | | Burdine Stadium; Miami, FL (rivalry) | L 10–14 | 55,530–65,000 | |
*Non-conference game; ^{†}Homecoming; Rankings from AP Poll released prior to the game
