= 1953 LSU Tigers football team =

American college football season

1953 LSU Tigers football
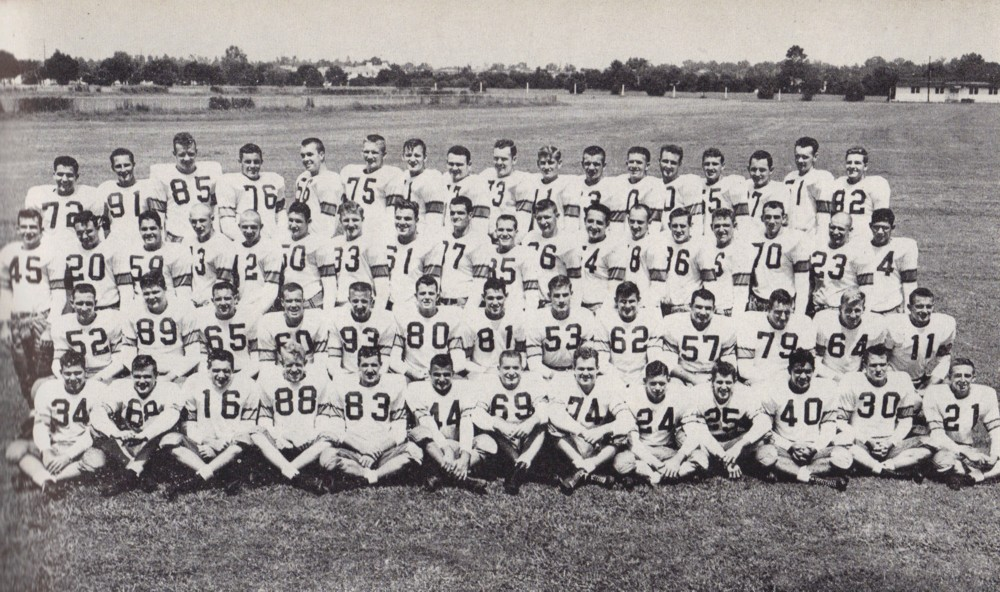
- Conference: Southeastern Conference
- Record: 5–3–3 (2–3–3 SEC)
- Head coach: Gaynell Tinsley (6th season)
- Home stadium: Tiger Stadium

1953 Southeastern Conference football standings
	Conf.					Overall
Team	W		L		T	W		L		T
No. 13 Alabama $	4	–	0	–	3	6	–	3	–	3
No. 8 Georgia Tech	4	–	1	–	1	9	–	2	–	1
No. 16 Kentucky	4	–	1	–	1	7	–	2	–	1
Ole Miss	4	–	1	–	1	7	–	2	–	1
No. 17 Auburn	4	–	2	–	1	7	–	3	–	1
Mississippi State	3	–	1	–	3	5	–	2	–	3
Tennessee	3	–	2	–	1	6	–	4	–	1
LSU	2	–	3	–	3	5	–	3	–	3
Florida	1	–	3	–	2	3	–	5	–	2
Vanderbilt	1	–	5	–	0	3	–	7	–	0
Georgia	1	–	5	–	0	3	–	8	–	0
Tulane	0	–	7	–	0	1	–	8	–	1
$ – Conference champion; Rankings from AP Poll

The 1953 LSU Tigers football team represented Louisiana State University (LSU) as a member of the Southeastern Conference during the 1953 college football season. Led by sixth-year head coach Gaynell Tinsley, the Tigers compiling an overall record of 5–3–3 with a mark of 2–3–3 in conference play, placing eighth in the SEC.

== Schedule ==
Date	Opponent	Rank	Site	Result	Attendance	Source
September 19	No. 11 Texas*		Tiger Stadium; Baton Rouge, LA	W 20–7	45,000	
September 26	at No. 5 Alabama		Ladd Memorial Stadium; Mobile, AL (rivalry)	T 7–7	33,809	
October 3	Boston College*	No. 19	Tiger Stadium; Baton Rouge, LA	W 42–6	25,000	
October 10	Kentucky	No. 14	Tiger Stadium; Baton Rouge, LA	T 6–6	38,000	
October 17	at Georgia		Sanford Field; Athens, GA	W 14–6	23,000	
October 24	at Florida	No. 14	Florida Field; Gainesville, FL (rivalry)	T 21–21	39,000	
October 31	No. 18 Ole Miss		Tiger Stadium; Baton Rouge, LA (rivalry)	L 16–27	45,000	
November 7	at Tennessee		Shields–Watkins Field; Knoxville, TN	L 14–32	23,000	
November 14	Mississippi State^{†}		Tiger Stadium; Baton Rouge, LA (rivalry)	L 13–26	32,000	
November 21	at Arkansas*		War Memorial Stadium; Little Rock, AR (rivalry)	W 9–8	22,000	
November 28	at Tulane		Tulane Stadium; New Orleans, LA (Battle for the Rag)	W 32–13		
*Non-conference game; ^{†}Homecoming; Rankings from AP Poll released prior to the game

== Personnel ==
=== Coaching staff ===
Name	Position	Seasons at LSU	Alma mater
Gaynell Tinsley	Head coach	6	LSU (1936)
Marty Broussard	Trainer		
Perry Moss	Backfield coach		
Abner Wimberly	Ends coach		
Clarence "Pop" Strange	Freshman coach		
Charles McClendon	Line coach		
Will Walls	Line coach		
Cecil Isbell	Backfield coach		
Adam Kretowicz	Northeast Scout		

== Roster ==
Name	Position	Number	Name	Position	Number
Arnold Alexander			Larry Jones	Center	
Andy Alford	Left Guard	65	Bob Lawrence		70
Phil Beron			Sam Leake		
George Brancato	Halfback	44	Jerry Marchand	Fullback	34
Larry Brooks			Joe McAdam		
Ivan Camp	Center	53	Paul Miller	Guard	
Art Croy			Jim Mitchell	End	87
Tommy Davis	Kicker/Fullback	33	Larry Mobley		
Richard Desonier	Right End		Sammy Murphy	Right End	
Lou Deutschman	Halfback	23	Charles Oakley	Fullback	21
Gary Dildy	Center		George Oliver		
Al Doggett	Quarterback/Halfback	24	Ted Paris		
Jerry Dumas		81	Enos Parker	Tackle	
Donald Dye			Dickie Prescott		
Ed Fogg	Left Tackle		Al Robichaux	Tackle	
Sid Fournet	Defensive tackle/offensive tackle		Vincent Roy		
Russell Gautreaux	Fullback		Billy Sheehy		
Vincent Gonzales			Don Stinson		
Al Guglielmo	Right End		Cliff Stringfield	Quarterback	
Bill Harris	Left Tackle	77	Joe Tuminello	End	84
Bobby Gene Hartley			Win Turner	Quarterback	12
Harry Hodges			Mack Wampold		
Levi (Chuck) Johns	Halfback	11	Reference:		
