= 1953 Georgia Bulldogs football team =

American college football season

1953 Georgia Bulldogs football
- Conference: Southeastern Conference
- Record: 3–8 (1–5 SEC)
- Head coach: Wally Butts (15th season)
- Home stadium: Sanford Stadium

1953 Southeastern Conference football standings
	Conf.					Overall
Team	W		L		T	W		L		T
No. 13 Alabama $	4	–	0	–	3	6	–	3	–	3
No. 8 Georgia Tech	4	–	1	–	1	9	–	2	–	1
No. 16 Kentucky	4	–	1	–	1	7	–	2	–	1
Ole Miss	4	–	1	–	1	7	–	2	–	1
No. 17 Auburn	4	–	2	–	1	7	–	3	–	1
Mississippi State	3	–	1	–	3	5	–	2	–	3
Tennessee	3	–	2	–	1	6	–	4	–	1
LSU	2	–	3	–	3	5	–	3	–	3
Florida	1	–	3	–	2	3	–	5	–	2
Vanderbilt	1	–	5	–	0	3	–	7	–	0
Georgia	1	–	5	–	0	3	–	8	–	0
Tulane	0	–	7	–	0	1	–	8	–	1
$ – Conference champion; Rankings from AP Poll

The 1953 Georgia Bulldogs football team was an American football team that represented the University of Georgia as a member of the Southeastern Conference (SEC) during the 1953 college football season. In their 15th year under head coach Wally Butts, the Bulldogs compiled an overall record of 3–8, with a conference record of 1–5, and finished 11th in the SEC.

== Schedule ==
Date	Opponent	Rank	Site	Result	Attendance	Source
September 19	at Villanova*		Philadelphia Municipal Stadium; Philadelphia, PA	W 32–19	97,802–98,000	
September 26	Tulane		Sanford Stadium; Athens, GA	W 16–14	15,000	
October 3	vs. Texas A&M*	No. 18	Cotton Bowl; Dallas, TX	L 12–14	22,342	
October 10	at No. 4 Maryland*		Byrd Stadium; College Park, MD	L 13–40	27,000	
October 17	LSU		Sanford Stadium; Athens, GA	L 6–14	23,000	
October 24	North Carolina*		Sanford Stadium; Athens, GA	W 27–14	30,000	
October 31	Alabama^{†}		Sanford Stadium; Athens, GA (rivalry)	L 12–33	36,000	
November 7	vs. Florida		Gator Bowl Stadium; Jacksonville, FL (rivalry)	L 7–21	36,000	
November 14	vs. No. 19 Auburn		Memorial Stadium; Columbus, GA (rivalry)	L 18–39	26,000	
November 21	at Mississippi Southern*		Mississippi Veterans Memorial Stadium; Jackson, MS	L 0–14	24,000	
November 28	at Georgia Tech		Grant Field; Atlanta, GA (rivalry)	L 12–28	41,000	
*Non-conference game; ^{†}Homecoming; Rankings from Coaches' Poll released prior to the game

== Roster ==
- Zeke Bratkowski, Sr. (C)
- Derwent Langley, Jr. (PC) C ML
