= 1953 Tennessee Volunteers football team =

American college football season

1953 Tennessee Volunteers football
- Conference: Southeastern Conference
- Record: 6–4–1 (3–2–1 SEC)
- Head coach: Harvey Robinson (1st season)
- Home stadium: Shields–Watkins Field

1953 Southeastern Conference football standings
	Conf.					Overall
Team	W		L		T	W		L		T
No. 13 Alabama $	4	–	0	–	3	6	–	3	–	3
No. 8 Georgia Tech	4	–	1	–	1	9	–	2	–	1
No. 16 Kentucky	4	–	1	–	1	7	–	2	–	1
Ole Miss	4	–	1	–	1	7	–	2	–	1
No. 17 Auburn	4	–	2	–	1	7	–	3	–	1
Mississippi State	3	–	1	–	3	5	–	2	–	3
Tennessee	3	–	2	–	1	6	–	4	–	1
LSU	2	–	3	–	3	5	–	3	–	3
Florida	1	–	3	–	2	3	–	5	–	2
Vanderbilt	1	–	5	–	0	3	–	7	–	0
Georgia	1	–	5	–	0	3	–	8	–	0
Tulane	0	–	7	–	0	1	–	8	–	1
$ – Conference champion; Rankings from AP Poll

The 1953 Tennessee Volunteers (variously Tennessee, UT, or the Vols) represented the University of Tennessee in the 1953 college football season. Playing as a member of the Southeastern Conference (SEC), the team was led by head coach Harvey Robinson, in his first year, and played their home games at Shields–Watkins Field in Knoxville, Tennessee. They finished the season with a record of six wins, four losses and one tie (6–4–1 overall, 3–2–1 in the SEC).

== Schedule ==
Date	Opponent	Rank	Site	Result	Attendance	Source
September 26	Mississippi State	No. 17	Shields–Watkins Field; Knoxville, TN	L 0–26	25,000	
October 3	No. 12 Duke*		Shields–Watkins Field; Knoxville, TN	L 7–21	30,000	
October 10	Chattanooga*		Shields–Watkins Field; Knoxville, TN	W 40–7	15,000	
October 17	at Alabama		Legion Field; Birmingham, AL (Third Saturday in October)	T 0–0	40,000	
October 22	Louisville*		Shields–Watkins Field; Knoxville, TN	W 59–6	15,000	
October 31	at North Carolina*		Kenan Memorial Stadium; Chapel Hill, NC	W 20–6	27,000	
November 7	LSU^{†}		Shields–Watkins Field; Knoxville, TN	W 32–14	23,000	
November 14	at Florida	No. 18	Florida Field; Gainesville, FL (rivalry)	W 9–7	29,000	
November 21	at No. 13 Kentucky		McLean Stadium; Lexington, KY (rivalry)	L 21–27	37,000	
November 28	Vanderbilt		Shields–Watkins Field; Knoxville, TN (rivalry)	W 33–6	21,000	
December 5	at Houston*		Rice Stadium; Houston, TX	L 19–33	23,000	
*Non-conference game; ^{†}Homecoming; Rankings from AP Poll released prior to the game

== Team players drafted into the NFL ==
Player	Position	Round	Pick	NFL club
Bill Barbish	Back	8	95	Cleveland Browns
Bob Fisher	Tackle	10	115	Pittsburgh Steelers
