= 1953 Lincoln Blue Tigers football team =

American college football season

1953 Lincoln Blue Tigers football

MAA co-champion
- Conference: Midwest Athletic Association
- Record: 8–0–1 (4–0–1 MAA)
- Head coach: Dwight T. Reed (5th season)

1953 Midwest Athletic Association football standings
	Conf.					Overall
Team	W		L		T	W		L		T
No. 4 Lincoln (MO) +	4	–	0	–	1	8	–	0	–	1
No. 3 Tennessee A&I +	2	–	0	–	1	8	–	0	–	1
No. 12 Grambling	2	–	1	–	0	8	–	2	–	0
No. 10 Texas Southern	2	–	1	–	0	7	–	3	–	0
Kentucky State	1	–	3	–	0	6	–	4	–	0
Central State (OH)	0	–	3	–	0	1	–	5	–	0
Jackson	0	–	3	–	0	5	–	4	–	0
+ – Conference co-champions; Rankings from Pittsburgh Courier

The 1953 Lincoln Blue Tigers football team was an American football team that represented Lincoln University of Missouri as a member of the Midwest Athletic Association (MAA) during the 1953 college football season. In their fifth season under head coach Dwight T. Reed, the Tigers compiled an 8–0–1 record. The team was ranked No. 4 among the 1953 black college teams with a Dickinson System rating of 24.25, behind Tennessee A&I (25.83), Prairie View (25.00), and Florida A&M (24.50).

== Schedule ==
Date	Opponent	Site	Result	Attendance	Source
September 18	vs. Tennessee A&I	Memphis, TN	T 19–19	> 5,000	
September 26	at Eastern Illinois*	Lincoln Field; Charleston, IL	W 30–0		
October 3	at Central State (OH)	Wilberforce, OH	W 40–13		
October 10	at Kentucky State	Frankfort, KY	W 25–6		
October 17	vs. Langston*	Blues Stadium; Kansas City, MO	W 20–6	3,500	
October 24	Texas Southern	Jefferson City, MO	W 26–7	4,500	
October 31	Alcorn A&M*	Jefferson City, MO	W 46–0		
November 7	at Jackson	Jackson, MS	W 27–13		
November 14	South Carolina State*	Jefferson City, MO	W 33–13		
*Non-conference game
