= 1953 Grambling Tigers football team =

American college football season

1953 Grambling Tigers football
- Conference: Midwest Athletic Association
- Record: 8–2 (2–1 MWAA)
- Head coach: Eddie Robinson (11th season)
- Home stadium: Tiger Stadium

1953 Midwest Athletic Association football standings
	Conf.					Overall
Team	W		L		T	W		L		T
No. 4 Lincoln (MO) +	4	–	0	–	1	8	–	0	–	1
No. 3 Tennessee A&I +	2	–	0	–	1	8	–	0	–	1
No. 12 Grambling	2	–	1	–	0	8	–	2	–	0
No. 10 Texas Southern	2	–	1	–	0	7	–	3	–	0
Kentucky State	1	–	3	–	0	6	–	4	–	0
Central State (OH)	0	–	3	–	0	1	–	5	–	0
Jackson	0	–	3	–	0	5	–	4	–	0
+ – Conference co-champions; Rankings from Pittsburgh Courier

The 1953 Grambling Tigers football team represented Grambling College (now known as Grambling State University) as a member of the Midwest Athletic Association (MWAA) during the 1953 college football season. Led by 11th-year head coach Eddie Robinson, the Tigers compiled an overall record of 8–2 and a mark of 2–1 in conference play.

== Schedule ==
Date	Opponent	Site	Result	Source
September 19	Paul Quinn*	Tiger Stadium; Grambling, LA	W 27–0	
September 25	Morris*	Tiger Stadium; Grambling, LA	W 40–0	
October 3	at Kentucky State	Alumni Field; Frankfort, KY	W 13–0	
October 10	Texas Southern	Tiger Stadium; Grambling, LA	L 7–22	
October 17	vs. Bishop*	Farrington Field; Fort Worth, TX	W 32–6	
October 26	vs. Wiley*	State Fair Stadium; Shreveport, LA	W 26–0	
October 31	at Jackson	Alumni Stadium; Jackson, MS	W 21–12	
November 7	at Leland*	Baton Rouge, LA	W 60–0	
November 14	at Prairie View A&M*	Prairie View, TX	L 0–32	
November 21	Arkansas AM&N*	Tiger Stadium; Grambling, LA	W 20–16	
*Non-conference game
