= 1953 Tennessee A&I Tigers football team =

American college football season

1953 Tennessee A&I Tigers football

Black football national champion MWAA co-champion
- Conference: Midwest Athletic Association
- Record: 8–0–1 (2–0–1 MWAA)
- Head coach: Henry Kean (3rd season)
- Home stadium: University Stadium

1953 Midwest Athletic Association football standings
	Conf.					Overall
Team	W		L		T	W		L		T
No. 4 Lincoln (MO) +	4	–	0	–	1	8	–	0	–	1
No. 3 Tennessee A&I +	2	–	0	–	1	8	–	0	–	1
No. 12 Grambling	2	–	1	–	0	8	–	2	–	0
No. 10 Texas Southern	2	–	1	–	0	7	–	3	–	0
Kentucky State	1	–	3	–	0	6	–	4	–	0
Central State (OH)	0	–	3	–	0	1	–	5	–	0
Jackson	0	–	3	–	0	5	–	4	–	0
+ – Conference co-champions; Rankings from Pittsburgh Courier

The 1953 Tennessee A&I Tigers football team was an American football team that represented Tennessee Agricultural & Industrial State College as a member of the Midwest Athletic Association (MWAA) during the 1953 college football season. In their third season under head coach Henry Kean, the Tigers compiled an 8–0–1 record, won the MWAA championship, and outscored all opponents by a total of 225 to 60.

The team was selected based on the Dickinson System as the 1953 black college national champion with a Dickinson rating of 25.83, placing ahead of Prairie View (25.00), Florida A&M (24.50), and Lincoln (MO) (24.25).

== Schedule ==
Date	Opponent	Site	Result	Attendance	Source
September 18	vs. Lincoln (MO)	Memphis, TN (Bluff City Classic)	T 19–19	> 5,000	
September 25	Virginia State*	Nashville, TN	W 25–7		
October 3	at Langston*	Anderson Field; Langston, OK	W 8–0		
October 9	Allen*	University Stadium; Nashville, TN	W 44–0		
October 17	at West Virginia State*	Charleston, WV	W 13–8		
October 24	at Central State (OH)	Wilberforce, OH	W 31–6		
October 31	at North Carolina College*	Durham, NC	W 19–0	8,000	
November 14	Morris Brown*	University Stadium; Nashville, TN	W 34–7		
November 26	Kentucky State	Nashville, TN	W 32–13		
*Non-conference game
