= 1953 Auburn Tigers football team =

American college football season

1953 Auburn Tigers football

Gator Bowl, L 13–35 vs. Texas Tech
- Conference: Southeastern Conference

Ranking
- AP: No. 17
- Record: 7–3–1 (4–2–1 SEC)
- Head coach: Ralph Jordan (3rd season)
- Captain: Vince Dooley
- Home stadium: Cliff Hare Stadium; Legion Field; Ladd Memorial Stadium

1953 Southeastern Conference football standings
	Conf.					Overall
Team	W		L		T	W		L		T
No. 13 Alabama $	4	–	0	–	3	6	–	3	–	3
No. 8 Georgia Tech	4	–	1	–	1	9	–	2	–	1
No. 16 Kentucky	4	–	1	–	1	7	–	2	–	1
Ole Miss	4	–	1	–	1	7	–	2	–	1
No. 17 Auburn	4	–	2	–	1	7	–	3	–	1
Mississippi State	3	–	1	–	3	5	–	2	–	3
Tennessee	3	–	2	–	1	6	–	4	–	1
LSU	2	–	3	–	3	5	–	3	–	3
Florida	1	–	3	–	2	3	–	5	–	2
Vanderbilt	1	–	5	–	0	3	–	7	–	0
Georgia	1	–	5	–	0	3	–	8	–	0
Tulane	0	–	7	–	0	1	–	8	–	1
$ – Conference champion; Rankings from AP Poll

The 1953 Auburn Tigers football team represented Auburn University in the 1953 college football season. It was the Tigers' 62nd overall and 21st season as a member of the Southeastern Conference (SEC). The team was led by head coach Ralph "Shug" Jordan, in his third year, and played their home games at Cliff Hare Stadium in Auburn, the Cramton Bowl in Montgomery and Ladd Memorial Stadium in Mobile, Alabama. They finished with a record of seven wins, three losses and one tie (7–3–1 overall, 4–2–1 in the SEC) and with a loss to Texas Tech in the Gator Bowl.

== Schedule ==
Date	Opponent	Rank	Site	Result	Attendance	Source
September 25	Stetson*		Cramton Bowl; Montgomery, AL	W 47–0	9,500	
October 3	No. 15 Ole Miss		Cliff Hare Stadium; Auburn, AL (rivalry)	W 13–0	20,000	
October 10	at No. 13 Mississippi State		Scott Field; Starkville, MS	T 21–21	23,000	
October 17	at No. 8 Georgia Tech	No. 19	Grant Field; Atlanta, GA (rivalry)	L 6–36	39,500	
October 24	Tulane		Ladd Memorial Stadium; Mobile, AL (rivalry)	W 34–7	18,763	
October 31	Florida^{†}		Cliff Hare Stadium; Auburn, AL (rivalry)	W 16–7	25,500	
November 6	at Miami (FL)*	No. 15	Burdine Stadium; Miami, FL	W 29–20	26,472	
November 14	vs. Georgia	No. 20	Memorial Stadium; Columbus, GA (rivalry)	W 39–18	26,000	
November 21	at Clemson*	No. 14	Memorial Stadium; Clemson, SC (rivalry)	W 45–19	20,000	
November 28	vs. Alabama	No. 16	Legion Field; Birmingham, AL (Iron Bowl)	L 7–10	43,018	
January 1	vs. Texas Tech*	No. 17	Gator Bowl Stadium; Jacksonville, FL (Gator Bowl)	L 13–35	28,641	
*Non-conference game; ^{†}Homecoming; Rankings from AP Poll released prior to the game

== Notable players ==
=== Vince Dooley ===
Serving as team captain, Dooley played quarterback and corner back for the 53' Auburn Tigers. Vince completed 25 of 47 passes for a 53.1 completion percentage. This was the best mark by an Auburn signal caller since All-American Travis Tidwell. Dooley was named to the Senior Bowl at the conclusion of the season and was invited to the annual Blue-Gray Game. He was named Offensive MVP after the Gator Bowl.

=== Ed Baker ===
Big Ed was named team co-captain to the 1953 Auburn Tigers. He opened up running lanes for future All-SEC back Fob James and was voted the SEC's "Best Offensive Center" at the conclusion of the regular season.
