= 1953 Mississippi State Maroons football team =

American college football season

1953 Mississippi State Maroons football
- Conference: Southeastern Conference
- Record: 5–2–3 (3–1–3 SEC)
- Head coach: Murray Warmath (2nd season)
- Home stadium: Scott Field; Mississippi Veterans Memorial Stadium

1953 Southeastern Conference football standings
	Conf.					Overall
Team	W		L		T	W		L		T
No. 13 Alabama $	4	–	0	–	3	6	–	3	–	3
No. 8 Georgia Tech	4	–	1	–	1	9	–	2	–	1
No. 16 Kentucky	4	–	1	–	1	7	–	2	–	1
Ole Miss	4	–	1	–	1	7	–	2	–	1
No. 17 Auburn	4	–	2	–	1	7	–	3	–	1
Mississippi State	3	–	1	–	3	5	–	2	–	3
Tennessee	3	–	2	–	1	6	–	4	–	1
LSU	2	–	3	–	3	5	–	3	–	3
Florida	1	–	3	–	2	3	–	5	–	2
Vanderbilt	1	–	5	–	0	3	–	7	–	0
Georgia	1	–	5	–	0	3	–	8	–	0
Tulane	0	–	7	–	0	1	–	8	–	1
$ – Conference champion; Rankings from AP Poll

The 1953 Mississippi State Maroons football team was an American football team that represented Mississippi State College (now known as Mississippi State University) as a member of the Southeastern Conference (SEC) during the 1953 college football season. In their second year under head coach Murray Warmath, the team compiled an overall record of 5–2–3, with a mark of 3–1–3 in conference play, and placed sixth in the SEC.

This would be the last season for head coach Murray Warmath, who was hired by Minnesota after the season, and for quarterback Jackie Parker, who went on to have a long career in the CFL. Parker would win his second SEC "Player of the Year" award by the Nashville Banner.

== Schedule ==
Date	Opponent	Rank	Site	Result	Attendance	Source
September 19	at Memphis State*		Crump Stadium; Memphis, TN	W 34–6		
September 26	at No. 17 Tennessee		Shields–Watkins Field; Knoxville, TN	W 26–0	25,000	
October 3	North Texas State*	No. 11	Scott Field; Starkville, MS	W 21–6	15,000	
October 10	Auburn	No. 13	Scott Field; Starkville, MS	T 21–21	23,000	
October 17	at Kentucky	No. 20	McLean Stadium; Lexington, KY	L 13–32	36,000	
October 24	at Alabama		Denny Stadium; Tuscaloosa, AL (rivalry)	T 7–7	28,000	
October 31	Texas Tech*		Mississippi Veterans Memorial Stadium; Jackson, MS	L 20–27	16,000	
November 7	at Tulane		Tulane Stadium; New Orleans, LA	W 21–0		
November 14	at LSU		Tiger Stadium; Baton Rouge, LA (rivalry)	W 26–13	32,000	
November 28	Ole Miss		Scott Field; Starkville, MS (Egg Bowl)	T 7–7	34,920	
*Non-conference game; Rankings from AP Poll released prior to the game
