= 1953 Kentucky Wildcats football team =

American college football season

1953 Kentucky Wildcats football
- Conference: Southeastern Conference

Ranking
- Coaches: No. 15
- AP: No. 16
- Record: 7–2–1 (4–1–1 SEC)
- Head coach: Bear Bryant (8th season)
- Home stadium: McLean Stadium

1953 Southeastern Conference football standings
	Conf.					Overall
Team	W		L		T	W		L		T
No. 13 Alabama $	4	–	0	–	3	6	–	3	–	3
No. 8 Georgia Tech	4	–	1	–	1	9	–	2	–	1
No. 16 Kentucky	4	–	1	–	1	7	–	2	–	1
Ole Miss	4	–	1	–	1	7	–	2	–	1
No. 17 Auburn	4	–	2	–	1	7	–	3	–	1
Mississippi State	3	–	1	–	3	5	–	2	–	3
Tennessee	3	–	2	–	1	6	–	4	–	1
LSU	2	–	3	–	3	5	–	3	–	3
Florida	1	–	3	–	2	3	–	5	–	2
Vanderbilt	1	–	5	–	0	3	–	7	–	0
Georgia	1	–	5	–	0	3	–	8	–	0
Tulane	0	–	7	–	0	1	–	8	–	1
$ – Conference champion; Rankings from AP Poll

The 1953 Kentucky Wildcats football team was an American football team that represented the University of Kentucky as a member of the Southeastern Conference (SEC) during the 1953 college football season. In their eighth year under head coach Bear Bryant, the Wildcats compiled an overall record of 7–2–1, with a conference record of 4–1–1, and finished third in the SEC. The team scored 201 points while allowing 116 points. This was Bryant's final season as head coach at Kentucky.

== Schedule ==
Date	Opponent	Rank	Site	Result	Attendance	Source
September 19	Texas A&M*		McLean Stadium; Lexington, KY	L 6–7	35,000	
September 26	at Ole Miss		Hemingway Stadium; Oxford, MS	L 6–22		
October 3	Florida		McLean Stadium; Lexington, KY (rivalry)	W 26–13		
October 10	at No. 17 LSU		Tiger Stadium; Baton Rouge, LA	T 6–6	38,000	
October 17	No. 20 Mississippi State		McLean Stadium; Lexington, KY	W 32–13	36,000	
October 24	Villanova*	No. 16	McLean Stadium; Lexington, KY	W 19–0	30,000	
October 31	at No. 12 Rice*	No. 19	Rice Stadium; Houston, TX	W 19–13	33,000	
November 7	at Vanderbilt	No. 14	Dudley Field; Nashville, TN (rivalry)	W 40–14	26,000	
November 14	Memphis State*	No. 13	McLean Stadium; Lexington, KY	W 20–7	20,000	
November 21	Tennessee	No. 13	McLean Stadium; Lexington, KY (rivalry)	W 27–21	37,000	
*Non-conference game; Rankings from AP Poll released prior to the game

== Roster ==
Player	Position	Summary
Steve Meilinger	End	
Tommy Adkins	Center	
Bob Hardy	Quarterback	24 Cmp, 47 Att, 418 Yds, 5 TD
Ralph Paolone	Running Back	108 Att, 620 Yds, 5.7 Avg
Tom Fillion	Running Back	
Jim Proffitt	End	
Howard Schnellenberger	End	
Duke Curnutte	Offensive Line	
Ray Correll	Offensive Line	
Harry Kirk	Offensive Line	
Joe Koch	Offensive Line	
Ray Callahan	Full Back	

== Awards and honors ==
- Ray Correll, guard, All-America selection
- Steve Meilinger, end, All-America selection

== 1954 NFL draft ==
Player	Position	Round	Pick	NFL club
Steve Meilinger	End	1	8	Washington Redskins
Tommy Adkins	Center	17	197	Baltimore Colts
