= 1953 Langston Lions football team =

American college football season

1953 Langston Lions football
- Conference: Southwestern Athletic Conference
- Record: 3–6 (2–4 SWAC)
- Head coach: Caesar Felton Gayles (24th season)
- Home stadium: Anderson Field

1953 Southwestern Athletic Conference football standings
	Conf.					Overall
Team	W		L		T	W		L		T
No. 1 Prairie View A&M $	6	–	0	–	0	12	–	0	–	0
No. 6 Southern	5	–	1	–	0	9	–	2	–	0
Texas College	4	–	2	–	0	5	–	4	–	0
Arkansas AM&N	2	–	3	–	1	3	–	5	–	2
Langston	2	–	4	–	0	3	–	6	–	0
Bishop	1	–	4	–	1	2	–	6	–	1
Wiley	0	–	6	–	0	2	–	7	–	0
$ – Conference champion; Rankings from Pittsburgh Courier

The 1953 Langston Lions football team represented Langston University as a member of the Southwestern Athletic Conference (SWAC) during the 1953 college football season. Led by 24th-year head coach Caesar Felton Gayles, the Lions compiled an overall record of 3–6, with a conference record of 2–4, and finished fifth in the SWAC.

== Schedule ==
Date	Opponent	Site	Result	Attendance	Source
September 26	at Bishop	Fair Park Stadium; Marshall, TX	W 40–6		
October 3	Tennessee A&I*	Anderson Field; Langston, OK	L 0–8		
October 10	at Texas College	Steer Stadium; Tyler, TX	L 7–20	3,500	
October 17	vs. Lincoln (MO)*	Blues Stadium; Kansas City, MO	L 6–20	3,500	
October 24	Southern	Anderson Stadium; Langston, OK	L 7–25		
October 31	vs. Paul Quinn*	Haskell, TX	W 31–0		
November 7	Wiley	Anderson Field; Langston, OK	W 32–20		
November 14	at Arkansas AM&N	Pumphrey Stadium; Pine Bluff, AR	L 0–19		
November 21	at Prairie View A&M	Blackshear Field; Prairie View, TX	L 0–27		
*Non-conference game
