= 1953 Vanderbilt Commodores football team =

American college football season

1953 Vanderbilt Commodores football
- Conference: Southeastern Conference
- Record: 3–7 (1–5 SEC)
- Head coach: Art Guepe (1st season)
- Captain: Larry Stone
- Home stadium: Dudley Field

1953 Southeastern Conference football standings
	Conf.					Overall
Team	W		L		T	W		L		T
No. 13 Alabama $	4	–	0	–	3	6	–	3	–	3
No. 8 Georgia Tech	4	–	1	–	1	9	–	2	–	1
No. 16 Kentucky	4	–	1	–	1	7	–	2	–	1
Ole Miss	4	–	1	–	1	7	–	2	–	1
No. 17 Auburn	4	–	2	–	1	7	–	3	–	1
Mississippi State	3	–	1	–	3	5	–	2	–	3
Tennessee	3	–	2	–	1	6	–	4	–	1
LSU	2	–	3	–	3	5	–	3	–	3
Florida	1	–	3	–	2	3	–	5	–	2
Vanderbilt	1	–	5	–	0	3	–	7	–	0
Georgia	1	–	5	–	0	3	–	8	–	0
Tulane	0	–	7	–	0	1	–	8	–	1
$ – Conference champion; Rankings from AP Poll

The 1953 Vanderbilt Commodores football team represented Vanderbilt University during the 1953 college football season. The team's head coach was Art Guepe, who was in his first year as the Commodores' head coach. Members of the Southeastern Conference, the Commodores played their home games at Dudley Field in Nashville, Tennessee. In 1952, Vanderbilt went 3–7 overall with a conference record of 1–5.

== Schedule ==
Date	Opponent	Site	Result	Attendance	Source
September 26	at Penn*	Franklin Field; Philadelphia, PA	L 7–13	35,000	
October 3	Alabama	Dudley Field; Nashville, TN	L 12–21	24,000	
October 10	at Ole Miss	Hemingway Stadium; Oxford, MS (rivalry)	L 6–28	20,000	
October 17	at Baylor*	Baylor Stadium; Waco, TX	L 6–47	17,000	
October 24	Virginia*^{†}	Dudley Field; Nashville, TN	W 28–13	16,000	
October 31	No. 8 Georgia Tech	Dudley Field; Nashville, TN (rivalry)	L 0–43	24,000	
November 7	No. 14 Kentucky	Dudley Field; Nashville, TN (rivalry)	L 14–40	26,000	
November 14	at Tulane	Tulane Stadium; New Orleans, LA	W 21–7		
November 21	Middle Tennessee*	Dudley Field; Nashville, TN	W 31–13	16,000	
November 26	at Tennessee	Shields–Watkins Field; Knoxville, TN (rivalry)	L 6–23	21,000	
*Non-conference game; ^{†}Homecoming; Rankings from AP Poll released prior to the game
