= 1953 Ole Miss Rebels football team =

American college football season

1953 Ole Miss Rebels football
- Conference: Southeastern Conference
- Record: 7–2–1 (4–1–1 SEC)
- Head coach: Johnny Vaught (7th season)
- Captain: Ed Beatty
- Home stadium: Hemingway Stadium; Mississippi Veterans Memorial Stadium

1953 Southeastern Conference football standings
| | Conf. | | | | | Overall |
| Team | W | | L | | T | W | | L | | T |
|---|---|---|---|---|---|---|---|---|---|---|
| No. 13 Alabama $ | 4 | – | 0 | – | 3 | 6 | – | 3 | – | 3 |
| No. 8 Georgia Tech | 4 | – | 1 | – | 1 | 9 | – | 2 | – | 1 |
| No. 16 Kentucky | 4 | – | 1 | – | 1 | 7 | – | 2 | – | 1 |
| Ole Miss | 4 | – | 1 | – | 1 | 7 | – | 2 | – | 1 |
| No. 17 Auburn | 4 | – | 2 | – | 1 | 7 | – | 3 | – | 1 |
| Mississippi State | 3 | – | 1 | – | 3 | 5 | – | 2 | – | 3 |
| Tennessee | 3 | – | 2 | – | 1 | 6 | – | 4 | – | 1 |
| LSU | 2 | – | 3 | – | 3 | 5 | – | 3 | – | 3 |
| Florida | 1 | – | 3 | – | 2 | 3 | – | 5 | – | 2 |
| Vanderbilt | 1 | – | 5 | – | 0 | 3 | – | 7 | – | 0 |
| Georgia | 1 | – | 5 | – | 0 | 3 | – | 8 | – | 0 |
| Tulane | 0 | – | 7 | – | 0 | 1 | – | 8 | – | 1 |
$ – Conference champion; Rankings from AP Poll

The 1953 Ole Miss Rebels football team represented the University of Mississippi during the 1953 college football season. The Rebels were led by seventh-year head coach Johnny Vaught and played their home games at Hemingway Stadium in Oxford, Mississippi (and one alternate site game in Jackson, Mississippi). They competed as members of the Southeastern Conference, finishing in a three-way tie for second with a record of 7–2–1 (4–1–1 SEC). They were not invited to a bowl game.

== Schedule ==
| Date | Opponent | Rank | Site | Result | Attendance | Source |
|---|---|---|---|---|---|---|
| September 19 | Chattanooga* | | Mississippi Veterans Memorial Stadium; Jackson, MS | W 39–6 | 18,000 | |
| September 26 | Kentucky | | Hemingway Stadium; Oxford, MS | W 22–6 | | |
| October 3 | at Auburn | No. 15 | Cliff Hare Stadium; Auburn, AL | L 0–13 | 20,000 | |
| October 10 | Vanderbilt^{†} | | Hemingway Stadium; Oxford, MS (rivalry) | W 28–6 | 20,000 | |
| October 17 | at Tulane | | Tulane Stadium; New Orleans, LA (rivalry) | W 45–14 | | |
| October 24 | vs. Arkansas* | | Crump Stadium; Memphis, TN (rivalry) | W 28–0 | 25,210 | |
| October 31 | at LSU | No. 18 | Tiger Stadium; Baton Rouge, LA (rivalry) | W 27–16 | 45,000 | |
| November 7 | North Texas State* | No. 12 | Hemingway Stadium; Oxford, MS | W 40–7 | | |
| November 14 | at No. 2 Maryland* | No. 11 | Byrd Stadium; College Park, MD | L 0–38 | 35,000 | |
| November 28 | at Mississippi State | | Scott Field; Starkville, MS (Egg Bowl) | T 7–7 | 34,920 | |
*Non-conference game; ^{†}Homecoming; Rankings from AP Poll released prior to the game

== Roster ==
- C Ed Beatty
- QB Eagle Day, So.
- Billy Kinard
- Harol Lofton
- Bobby McCool
- OG Crawford Mims
