= 1953 Wiley Wildcats football team =

American college football season

1953 Wiley Wildcats football
- Conference: Southwestern Athletic Conference
- Record: 2–7 (0–6 SWAC)
- Head coach: J. Forrest Kelley (2nd season)
- Home stadium: Wiley Field

1953 Southwestern Athletic Conference football standings
	Conf.					Overall
Team	W		L		T	W		L		T
No. 1 Prairie View A&M $	6	–	0	–	0	12	–	0	–	0
No. 6 Southern	5	–	1	–	0	9	–	2	–	0
Texas College	4	–	2	–	0	5	–	4	–	0
Arkansas AM&N	2	–	3	–	1	3	–	5	–	2
Langston	2	–	4	–	0	3	–	6	–	0
Bishop	1	–	4	–	1	2	–	6	–	1
Wiley	0	–	6	–	0	2	–	7	–	0
$ – Conference champion; Rankings from Pittsburgh Courier

The 1953 Wiley Wildcats football team represented Wiley College as a member of the Southwestern Athletic Conference (SWAC) during the 1953 college football season. Led by second-year head coach J. Forrest Kelley, the Wildcats compiled an overall record of 2–7, with a conference record of 0–6, and finished seventh in the SWAC.

== Schedule ==
Date	Opponent	Site	Result	Attendance	Source
September 26	Philander Smith*	Fair Park Stadium; Marshall, TX	W 54–6		
October 3	at Arkansas AM&N	Pumphrey Stadium; Pine Bluff, AR	L 0–19		
October 19	vs. Prairie View A&M	Cotton Bowl; Dallas, TX (State Fair Classic)	L 0–32	25,000	
October 26	vs. Grambling*	State Fair Stadium; Shreveport, LA	L 0–26		
October 31	Bishop	Wiley Field; Marshall, TX	L 7–20	4,500	
November 7	at Langston	Anderson Field; Langston, OK	L 20–32		
November 14	Southern	Wiley Field; Marshall, TX	L 13–70		
November 21	at Paul Quinn*	Katy Park; Waco, TX	W 24–6		
November 26	Texas College	Wiley Field; Marshall, TX	L 13–38	3,500	
*Non-conference game
