= 1953 Georgia Tech Yellow Jackets football team =

American college football season

1953 Georgia Tech Yellow Jackets football

Sugar Bowl champion

Sugar Bowl, W 42–19 vs. West Virginia
- Conference: Southeastern Conference

Ranking
- Coaches: No. 9
- AP: No. 8
- Record: 9–2–1 (4–1–1 SEC)
- Head coach: Bobby Dodd (9th season)
- Captains: Sam Hensley; Ed Gossage; Orville Vereen
- Home stadium: Grant Field

1953 Southeastern Conference football standings
	Conf.					Overall
Team	W		L		T	W		L		T
No. 13 Alabama $	4	–	0	–	3	6	–	3	–	3
No. 8 Georgia Tech	4	–	1	–	1	9	–	2	–	1
No. 16 Kentucky	4	–	1	–	1	7	–	2	–	1
Ole Miss	4	–	1	–	1	7	–	2	–	1
No. 17 Auburn	4	–	2	–	1	7	–	3	–	1
Mississippi State	3	–	1	–	3	5	–	2	–	3
Tennessee	3	–	2	–	1	6	–	4	–	1
LSU	2	–	3	–	3	5	–	3	–	3
Florida	1	–	3	–	2	3	–	5	–	2
Vanderbilt	1	–	5	–	0	3	–	7	–	0
Georgia	1	–	5	–	0	3	–	8	–	0
Tulane	0	–	7	–	0	1	–	8	–	1
$ – Conference champion; Rankings from AP Poll

The 1953 Georgia Tech Yellow Jackets football team represented the Georgia Institute of Technology during the 1953 college football season. The Yellow Jackets were led by ninth-year head coach Bobby Dodd and played their home games at Grant Field in Atlanta. They finished second in the Southeastern Conference to Alabama, who had upset then-No. 5 Georgia Tech in Birmingham, giving the Yellow Jackets their first conference loss since 1950. The Yellow Jackets were invited to the 1954 Sugar Bowl, where they defeated West Virginia, 42–19.

== Schedule ==
Date	Opponent	Rank	Site	TV	Result	Attendance	Source
September 19	Davidson*	No. 3	Grant Field; Atlanta, GA		W 53–0	22,000	
September 26	at No. 15 Florida	No. 3	Florida Field; Gainesville, FL		T 0–0	41,000	
October 3	SMU*	No. 9	Grant Field; Atlanta, GA		W 6–4	37,000	
October 10	at Tulane	No. 10	Tulane Stadium; New Orleans, LA		W 27–13	30,000	
October 17	No. 19 Auburn	No. 6	Grant Field; Atlanta, GA (rivalry)		W 36–6	39,500	
October 24	at No. 1 Notre Dame*	No. 4	Notre Dame Stadium; Notre Dame, IN (rivalry)		L 14–27	58,254	
October 31	at Vanderbilt	No. 8	Dudley Field; Nashville, TN (rivalry)		W 43–0	24,000	
November 7	Clemson*^{†}	No. 6	Grant Field; Atlanta, GA (rivalry)		W 20–7	35,000	
November 14	at Alabama	No. 5	Legion Field; Birmingham, AL (rivalry)		L 6–13	42,500	
November 21	No. 15 Duke*	No. 12	Grant Field; Atlanta, GA		W 13–10	40,000	
November 28	Georgia	No. 10	Grant Field; Atlanta, GA (rivalry)		W 28–12	41,000	
January 1	vs. No. 10 West Virginia*	No. 8	Tulane Stadium; New Orleans, LA (Sugar Bowl)	ABC	W 42–19	71,666	
*Non-conference game; ^{†}Homecoming; Rankings from AP Poll released prior to the game
