= 1953 Tulane Green Wave football team =

American college football season

1953 Tulane Green Wave football
- Conference: Southeastern Conference
- Record: 1–8–1 (0–7 SEC)
- Head coach: Raymond Wolf (2nd season)
- Home stadium: Tulane Stadium

1953 Southeastern Conference football standings
	Conf.					Overall
Team	W		L		T	W		L		T
No. 13 Alabama $	4	–	0	–	3	6	–	3	–	3
No. 8 Georgia Tech	4	–	1	–	1	9	–	2	–	1
No. 16 Kentucky	4	–	1	–	1	7	–	2	–	1
Ole Miss	4	–	1	–	1	7	–	2	–	1
No. 17 Auburn	4	–	2	–	1	7	–	3	–	1
Mississippi State	3	–	1	–	3	5	–	2	–	3
Tennessee	3	–	2	–	1	6	–	4	–	1
LSU	2	–	3	–	3	5	–	3	–	3
Florida	1	–	3	–	2	3	–	5	–	2
Vanderbilt	1	–	5	–	0	3	–	7	–	0
Georgia	1	–	5	–	0	3	–	8	–	0
Tulane	0	–	7	–	0	1	–	8	–	1
$ – Conference champion; Rankings from AP Poll

The 1953 Tulane Green Wave football team was an American football team that represented Tulane University during the 1953 college football season as a member of the Southeastern Conference. In its second year under head coach Raymond Wolf, Tulane compiled a 1–8–1 record (0–7 in conference games), finished in last place in the SEC, and was outscored by a total of 228 to 129.

The Green Wave played its home games at Tulane Stadium in New Orleans.

== Schedule ==
Date	Opponent	Site	Result	Attendance	Source
September 19	The Citadel*	Tulane Stadium; New Orleans, LA	W 54–6		
September 26	at Georgia	Sanford Stadium; Athens, GA	L 14–16		
October 3	at No. 4 Michigan*	Michigan Stadium; Ann Arbor, MI	L 7–26	52,914	
October 10	No. 10 Georgia Tech	Tulane Stadium; New Orleans, LA	L 13–27	30,000	
October 17	Ole Miss	Tulane Stadium; New Orleans, LA (rivalry)	L 14–45		
October 24	vs. Auburn	Ladd Memorial Stadium; Mobile, AL (rivalry)	L 7–34	18,763	
October 31	No. 15 Army*^{†}	Tulane Stadium; New Orleans, LA	T 0–0	32,500–40,000	
November 7	Mississippi State	Tulane Stadium; New Orleans, LA	L 0–21		
November 14	Vanderbilt	Tulane Stadium; New Orleans, LA	L 7–21		
November 28	at LSU	Tiger Stadium; Baton Rouge, LA (Battle for the Rag)	L 13–32		
*Non-conference game; ^{†}Homecoming; Rankings from AP Poll released prior to the game
