= Bob Holladay =

American football player (1932–2025)

No. 46, 27, 40
- Position: Defensive back

Personal information
- Born: March 13, 1932; Shreveport, Louisiana, U.S.
- Died: April 2, 2025 (aged 93); Natchitoches, Louisiana, U.S.
- Listed height: 5 ft 11 in (1.80 m)
- Listed weight: 175 lb (79 kg)

Career information
- High school: Columbia (LA)
- College: Tulsa

Career history
- San Francisco 49ers (1956, 1957); Los Angeles Rams (1956)

Career statistics
- Games played: 18
- Stats at Pro Football Reference

Robert B. Holladay (March 13, 1932 – April 2, 2025) was an American professional football player who was a defensive back for the San Francisco 49ers and Los Angeles Rams of the National Football League (NFL). He played college football for the Tulsa Golden Hurricane.

Holladay died on April 2, 2025, at the age of 93.
