= 1953 Texas Southern Tigers football team =

American college football season

1953 Texas Southern Tigers football

Prairie View Bowl, L 8–33 vs. Prairie View A&M
- Conference: Midwest Athletic Association
- Record: 7–3 (2–1 MWAA)
- Head coach: Alexander Durley (5th season)
- Home stadium: Public School Stadium

1953 Midwest Athletic Association football standings
	Conf.					Overall
Team	W		L		T	W		L		T
No. 4 Lincoln (MO) +	4	–	0	–	1	8	–	0	–	1
No. 3 Tennessee A&I +	2	–	0	–	1	8	–	0	–	1
No. 12 Grambling	2	–	1	–	0	8	–	2	–	0
No. 10 Texas Southern	2	–	1	–	0	7	–	3	–	0
Kentucky State	1	–	3	–	0	6	–	4	–	0
Central State (OH)	0	–	3	–	0	1	–	5	–	0
Jackson	0	–	3	–	0	5	–	4	–	0
+ – Conference co-champions; Rankings from Pittsburgh Courier

The 1953 Texas Southern Tigers football team was an American football team that represented Texas Southern University as a member of the Midwest Athletic Association (MWAA) during the 1953 college football season. Led by fifth-year head coach Alexander Durley, the Tigers compiled an overall record of 7–3, with a mark of 2–1 in the MWAA.

== Schedule ==
Date	Opponent	Site	Result	Source
September 26	at Southern*	Memorial Stadium; Baton Rouge, LA	L 6–28	
October 5	Texas College*	Public School Stadium; Houston, TX	W 27–6	
October 10	at Grambling	Tiger Stadium; Grambling, LA	W 22–7	
October 17	Jackson	Public School Stadium; Houston, TX	W 33–0	
October 24	at Lincoln (MO)	Public School Stadium; Jefferson City, MO	L 7–26	
October 31	Xavier (LA)*	Public School Stadium; Houston, TX	W 10–7	
November 7	Paul Quinn*	Public School Stadium; Houston, TX	W 13–6	
November 14	Alcorn A&M*	Public School Stadium; Houston, TX	W 14–6	
November 26	Arkansas AM&N*	Public School Stadium; Houston, TX	W 20–12	
January 1, 1954	vs. Prairie View A&M*	Public School Stadium; Houston, TX (Prairie View Bowl)	L 8–33	
*Non-conference game
