= 1953 Southern Jaguars football team =

American college football season

1953 Southern Jaguars football
- Conference: Southwestern Athletic Conference
- Record: 9–2 (5–1 SWAC)
- Head coach: Ace Mumford (18th season)
- Home stadium: University Stadium; Memorial Stadium

1953 Southwestern Athletic Conference football standings
	Conf.					Overall
Team	W		L		T	W		L		T
No. 1 Prairie View A&M $	6	–	0	–	0	12	–	0	–	0
No. 6 Southern	5	–	1	–	0	9	–	2	–	0
Texas College	4	–	2	–	0	5	–	4	–	0
Arkansas AM&N	2	–	3	–	1	3	–	5	–	2
Langston	2	–	4	–	0	3	–	6	–	0
Bishop	1	–	4	–	1	2	–	6	–	1
Wiley	0	–	6	–	0	2	–	7	–	0
$ – Conference champion; Rankings from Pittsburgh Courier

The 1953 Southern Jaguars football team was an American football team that represented Southern University as a member of the Southwestern Athletic Conference (SWAC) during the 1953 college football season. Led by Ace Mumford in his 18th season as head coach, the Jaguars compiled an overall record of 9–2, with a mark of 5–1 in conference play, and finished second in the SWAC.

== Schedule ==
Date	Opponent	Site	Result	Source
September 26	Texas Southern*	Memorial Stadium; Baton Rouge, LA	W 28–6	
October 3	Alcorn A&M*	Memorial Stadium; Baton Rouge, LA	W 33–0	
October 10	vs. Paul Quinn*	Dal-Hi Stadium; Dallas, TX	W 18–12	
October 17	Arkansas AM&N	Memorial Stadium; Baton Rouge, LA	W 60–0	
October 24	at Langston	Anderson Stadium; Langston, OK	W 25–7	
October 31	Texas College	Memorial Stadium; Baton Rouge, LA	W 58–0	
November 7	vs. Bishop	State Fair Stadium; Shreveport, LA	W 79–0	
November 14	at Wiley	Wiley Field; Marshall, TX	W 70–13	
November 21	at Florida A&M*	Bragg Stadium; Tallahassee, FL	L 25–33	
November 28	Prairie View A&M	Memorial Stadium; Baton Rouge, LA	L 0–20	
December 5	at Xavier (LA)*	Xavier Stadium; New Orleans, LA (Pelican State Classic)	W 41–15	
*Non-conference game
