= 1954 Gator Bowl (January) =

American college football game

Texas Tech Red Raiders	Auburn Tigers
(10–1)	(7–2–1)
Border	SEC
35	13
Head coach: DeWitt Weaver	Head coach: Ralph Jordan
AP / Coaches; 12 / 12	AP / Coaches; 17 / NR
	1	2	3	4	Total
Texas Tech	0	7	14	14	35
Auburn	7	6	0	0	13
- Date: January 1, 1954
- Season: 1953
- Stadium: Gator Bowl Stadium
- Location: Jacksonville, Florida
- MVP: RB Bobby Cavazos (Texas Tech); QB Vince Dooley (Auburn)
- Referee: E.D. Cavette (SEC; split crew: SEC, Border)
- Attendance: 28,641

The 1954 Gator Bowl was an American college football bowl game played on January 1, 1954, at Gator Bowl Stadium in Jacksonville, Florida. It was the ninth annual playing of the Gator Bowl. The game pitted the Texas Tech Red Raiders against the Auburn Tigers

== Background ==
The Red Raiders finished as champions of the Border Conference for the fifth time in eleven years while winning ten games for the first time since 1938, with a 27–14 loss to Texas A&M being the only blemish. This was their first-ever Gator Bowl appearance. As for Auburn, they started the season 2-1-1, with two victories (including a victory over #15 Ole Miss), a tie to #13 Mississippi State, and a loss to #8 Georgia Tech. The Tigers would promptly win their next five games to rise to #16 in the rankings leading into the Iron Bowl matchup with Alabama, which they lost 10–7, as Auburn finished third in the Southeastern Conference. This was Auburn's first bowl game since 1938.

== Game summary ==
- Auburn – Bobby Duke, 1-yard touchdown run (Joe Davis kick)
- Texas Tech – Bobby Cavazos, 6-yard touchdown run (Jack Kirkpatrick kick)
- Auburn – Vince Dooley, 10-yard touchdown run (kick failed)
- Texas Tech – Paul Erwin, 52-yard touchdown pass from Kirkpatrick (Kirkpatrick kick)
- Texas Tech – Don Lewis, fumble recovery in end zone (Kirkpatrick kick)
- Texas Tech – Cavazos, 59-yard touchdown run (Kirkpatrick kick)
- Texas Tech – Cavazos, 2-yard touchdown run (Kirkpatrick kick)

Texas Tech outrushed the Tigers 226 to 195, outthrew them 145 to 72 while forcing two four turnovers. Bobby Cavazos ran for 141 yards on 13 carries. Vince Dooley went 4-of-8 for 49 yards while rushing for 56 yards on 14 carries. Both were named MVP.

== Statistics ==
Statistics	Texas Tech	Auburn
First downs	11	12
Rushing yards	226	195
Passing yards	145	72
Total offense	371	267
Passing	6–12–1	6–16–32
Fumbles–lost	0–0	2–2
Penalties–yards	6–83	5–66
Punts–average	6–33.1	6–30.5

== Aftermath ==
As for Tech, they finished champions of the conference for two more seasons before becoming independent in 1957 and member of the Southwest Conference in 1960. They reached the Gator Bowl five years later in 1965. Tech did not win a bowl game again until 1973. Auburn would finish 8–3 the following year, while competing in the Gator Bowl once again, played on December 31, 1954, becoming the first school to play the same bowl twice in the same year. This time, they won, beating Baylor 33–13.
