= Alumni Field (Kentucky State) =

Stadium in Frankfort, United States

- Interactive map of Alumni Field
- Location: Frankfort, Kentucky
- Coordinates: 38°11′35″N 84°51′10″W
- Owner: Kentucky State University
- Operator: Kentucky State University
- Capacity: 6,000
- Surface: Synthetic Turf

Tenant
- Kentucky State University (NCAA Division II)

Alumni Field is a stadium in Frankfort, Kentucky. It is primarily used for American football, and is the home field of Kentucky State University. Also there are baseball, football and softball coaching offices, as well as locker rooms, an athletic training room, media room and weight room. New synthetic turf was laid at the end of 2019 with anticipated completion date for June 2020.
