= 1954 Sugar Bowl =

American college football game

- 20th Sugar Bowl
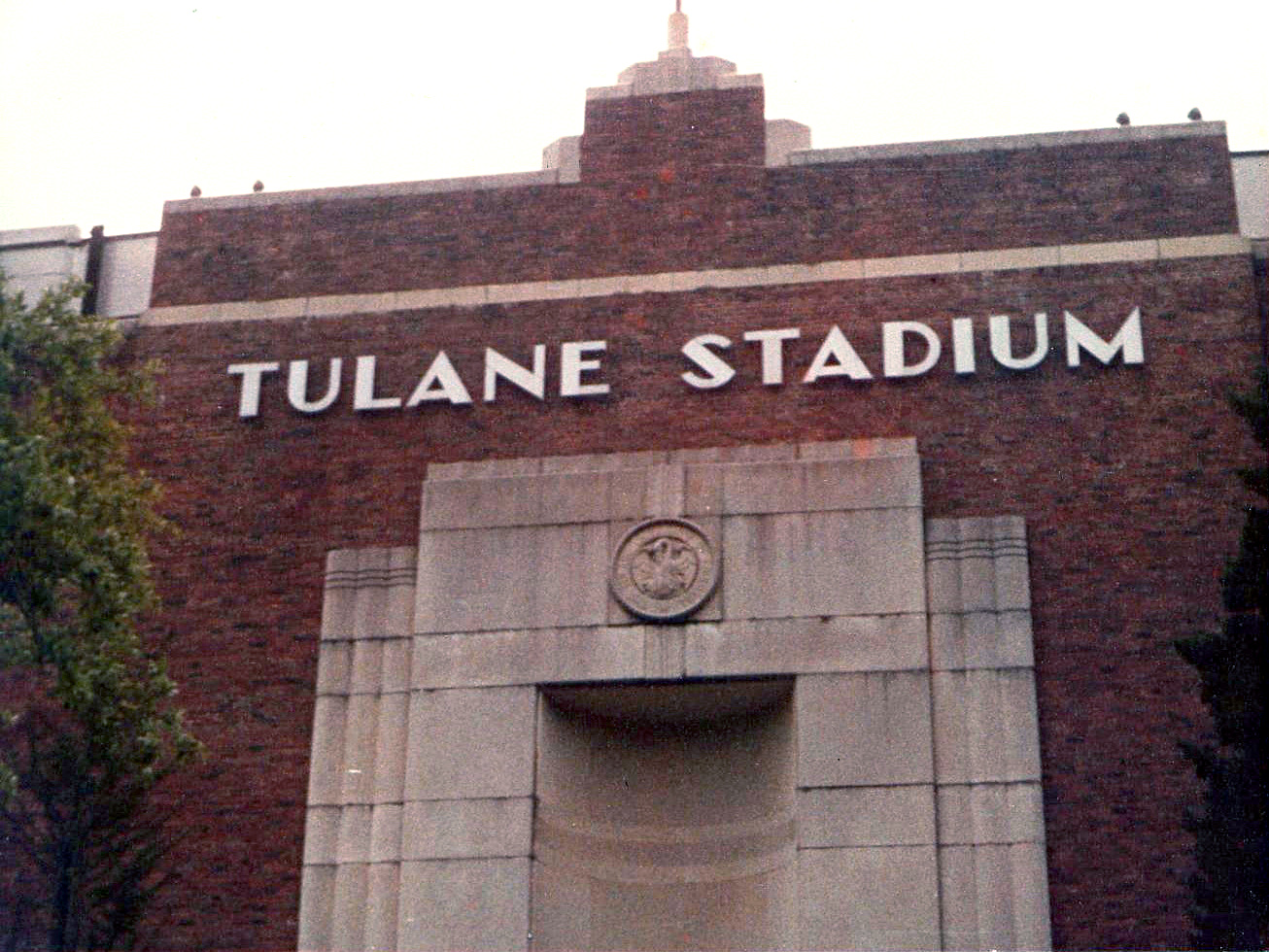
- Tulane Stadium in New Orleans, Louisiana, hosted the Sugar Bowl.
West Virginia Mountaineers	Georgia Tech Yellow Jackets
(8–1)	(8–2–1)
SoCon	SEC
19	42
Head coach: Art Lewis	Head coach: Bobby Dodd
AP / Coaches; 10 / 13	AP / Coaches; 8 / 9
	1	2	3	4	Total
West Virginia	0	6	0	13	19
Georgia Tech	14	6	9	13	42
- Date: January 1, 1954
- Season: 1953
- Stadium: Tulane Stadium
- Location: New Orleans, Louisiana
- MVP: QB Pepper Rodgers (Georgia Tech)
- Favorite: Georgia Tech by 12 1/2
- Referee: T. G. Kain (SEC; split crew: SEC, Southern)
- Attendance: 71,666

United States TV coverage
- Network: ABC
- Announcers: Harry Wismer; Johnny Lujack

The 1954 Sugar Bowl matched the Georgia Tech Yellow Jackets and the West Virginia Mountaineers in the 20th edition of the Sugar Bowl.

== Background ==
The Yellow Jackets were in their 2nd straight Sugar Bowl and 3rd in 10 years. They had tied for 2nd in the Southeastern Conference. West Virginia had started with 7 straight victories, with a Southern Conference championship, their first ever title. But a loss to South Carolina knocked them from #8 to #19 though a win at NC State in the last game of the season made them #10, and the Sugar Bowl had their 9th consecutive matchup of top 10 ranked teams. This was West Virginia's first Sugar Bowl and first bowl game in five years. Due to the ACC agreeing to a bid with the Orange Bowl, the number of teams were limited for the Sugar Bowl. Georgia Tech had been invited to the Cotton Bowl Classic, but they decided to join the Sugar Bowl after a revote, which sent SEC Champ Alabama to the Cotton Bowl instead.

== Game summary ==
Georgia Tech started the scoring off earlier with a 79 yard drive on 5 passes that culminated with a Pepper Rodgers touchdown pass to Sam Hensley. On GT's next series, Rodgers threw another touchdown, this time to Jimmy Durham. The Mountaineers drove 70 yards and scored on a Danny Williams touchdown run to narrow the lead to 14-6. After West Virginia recovered a fumble, they drove to the GT 5, but a 16 yard sack made them throw a desperate pass into the end zone, which was incomplete. The Yellow Jackets took advantage and made their own drive which culminated with a Henry Hair touchdown catch from Rodgers to give them a 20-6 halftime lead. Rodgers would add in a field goal and Leon Hardeman would score on a touchdown run to make the lead 29-6 by the fourth quarter. Joe Marconi made it a 16 point game on his touchdown run, but Ruffin made it 35-13 on a touchdown run of his own. WVU would narrow it again on an Allman touchdown run, but Bill Teas would put the exclamation point on the game with his rushing touchdown to make the final score 42-19. West Virginia had a rushing attack, but could not get the passing game going and was doomed with their six turnovers, four of them on fumbles by the backs, as Georgia Tech out-threw them with Rodgers, who went 18 of 26 for 195 yards.

== Aftermath ==
Despite four more Southern Conference titles in the next five years, West Virginia would take 40 years to make it to their next Sugar Bowl. Georgia Tech would play in just one more Sugar Bowl, in 1956.

== Statistics ==
Statistics	GT	WVU
First downs	19	19
Yards rushing	170	223
Yards passing	268	76
Total yards	438	301
Punts-Average	1-36.0	2-28.5
Fumbles-Lost	3-1	5-4
Interceptions	2	2
Penalties-Yards	7-45	5-35
