= 1953 Prairie View A&M Panthers football team =

American college football season

1953 Prairie View A&M Panthers football

Black college national champion

Orange Blossom Classic, W 33–27 vs. Florida A&M Prairie View Bowl, W 33–8 vs. Texas Southern
- Conference: Southwestern Athletic Conference
- Record: 12–0 (6–0 SWAC)
- Head coach: Billy Nicks (5th season)

1953 Southwestern Athletic Conference football standings
	Conf.					Overall
Team	W		L		T	W		L		T
No. 1 Prairie View A&M $	6	–	0	–	0	12	–	0	–	0
No. 6 Southern	5	–	1	–	0	9	–	2	–	0
Texas College	4	–	2	–	0	5	–	4	–	0
Arkansas AM&N	2	–	3	–	1	3	–	5	–	2
Langston	2	–	4	–	0	3	–	6	–	0
Bishop	1	–	4	–	1	2	–	6	–	1
Wiley	0	–	6	–	0	2	–	7	–	0
$ – Conference champion; Rankings from Pittsburgh Courier

The 1953 Prairie View A&M Panthers football team was an American football team that represented Prairie View A&M University in the Southwestern Athletic Conference (SWAC) during the 1953 college football season. In their fifth season under head coach Billy Nicks, the Panthers compiled a perfect 12–0 record, won the SWAC championship, and outscored opponents by a total of 387 to 88. In two postseason games, they defeated Florida A&M in the Orange Blossom Classic and Texas Southern in the Prairie View Bowl. The Panthers were recognized as the 1953 black college national champion.

== Schedule ==
Date	Opponent	Site	Result	Attendance	Source
September 19	at Fort Hood Tankers*	Prichard Memorial Stadium; Fort Hood, TX	W 21–6	7,000	
October 3	Bishop	Blackshear Field; Prairie View, TX	W 40–19		
October 10	at Jackson*	Alumni Field; Jackson, MS	W 61–0		
October 19	vs. Wiley	Cotton Bowl; Dallas, TX (State Fair Classic)	W 32–0	25,000	
October 24	at Morris Brown*	Herndon Stadium; Atlanta, GA	W 27–15		
October 31	at Arkansas AM&N	Pumphrey Stadium; Pine Bluff, AR	W 34–6		
November 7	at Texas College	Steer Stadium; Tyler, TX	W 27–7		
November 14	Grambling*	Blackshear Field; Prairie View, TX	W 32–0	10,000	
November 21	Langston	Blackshear Field; Prairie View, TX	W 27–0		
November 28	at Southern	University Stadium; Baton Rouge, LA	W 20–0		
December 5	vs. Florida A&M*	Burdine Stadium; Miami, FL (Orange Blossom Classic)	W 33–27	41,313	
January 1, 1954	vs. Texas Southern*	Public School Stadium; Houston, TX (Prairie View Bowl, rivalry)	W 33–8	15,000	
*Non-conference game
