= 1939 Missouri Intercollegiate Athletic Association football season =

- Sport: Football
- Teams: 6
- Champion: Maryville

Football seasons

1939 Missouri Intercollegiate Athletic Association football standings
	Conf.					Overall
Team	W		L		T	W		L		T
Maryville (MO) $	5	–	0	–	0	9	–	0	–	0
Springfield (MO)	3	–	1	–	1	7	–	1	–	1
Missouri Mines	3	–	2	–	0	5	–	4	–	0
Warrensburg	1	–	2	–	2	3	–	3	–	3
Cape Girardeau	1	–	3	–	1	5	–	3	–	1
Kirksville	0	–	5	–	0	2	–	6	–	0
$ – Conference champion

The 1939 Missouri Intercollegiate Athletic Association football season was the season of college football played by the six member schools of the Missouri Intercollegiate Athletic Association (MIAA) as part of the 1939 college football season.

The Maryville Bearcats from Maryville, Missouri, led by head coach Ryland Milner, compiled a perfect 9–0 record, shut out seven of nine opponents, and won the MIAA championship.The 1939 season was part of a 21-game winning streak for Maryville that began with an undefeated 1938 season and ended in October 1940.

== Conference overview ==
Conf. rank	Team	Head coach	Conf. record	Overall record	Points scored	Points against
1	Maryville	Ryland Milner	5–0	9–0	167	20
2	Springfield	Red Blair	3–1–1	7–1–1	129	75
3	Rolla	Gale Bullman	3–2	5–4	111	120
4	Warrensburg	Carl Voltmer	1–2–2	3–3–3		
5	Cape Girardeau	Abe Stuber	1–3–1	5–3–1		
6	Kifksville	Malcolm Eiken	0–5	2–6	54	100

== Teams ==
=== Maryville ===
1939 Maryville Bearcats football

MIAA champion
- Conference: Missouri Intercollegiate Athletic Association
- Record: 9–0 (5–0 MIAA)
- Head coach: Ryland Milner (3rd season)
- Captain: Bill Bernau

The 1939 Maryville Bearcats football team was an American football team that represented Maryville State Teachers College (later renamed as Northwest Missouri State University) at Maryville, Missouri. In their third season under head coach Ryland Milner, the Bearcats compiled a perfect 9–0 record (5–0 against MIAA opponents), shut out seven of nine opponents, and won the Missouri Intercollegiate Athletics Association (MIAA) championship.

Guard Marion Rogers was selected by the Associated Press as a first-team player on the 1939 Little All-America college football team. Four Northwest Missouri players received first-team honors on the 1939 all-conference team: Bill Bernau at back; Green at tackle; and M. Rogers and R. Rogers at guard.

Maryville was ranked at No. 155 (out of 609 teams) in the final Litkenhous Ratings for 1939.

Date	Opponent	Site	Result	Source
September 22	Tahlequah*	Maryville, MO	W 7–0	
September 30	at Washington University*	Francis Field; St. Louis, MO	W 9–7	
October 6	at Sioux Falls*	Sioux Falls, SD	W 48–0	
October 13	Southwest Missouri State*	Maryville, MO	W 21–0	
October 20	at Rolla	Rolla, MO	W 17–0	
October 27	Chadron State*	Maryville, MO	W 27–0	
November 3	at Cape Girardeau	Houck Field Stadium; Cape Girardeau, MO	W 7–0	
November 10	Kirksville	Maryville, MO	W 19–13	
November 17	at Warrensburg	Warrensburg, MO	W 12–0	
*Non-conference game

=== Springfield ===
1939 Springfield Bears football
- Conference: Missouri Intercollegiate Athletic Association
- Record: 7–1–1 (3–1–1 MIAA)
- Head coach: Red Blair (2nd season)
- Home stadium: STC Stadium

The 1939 Springfield Bears football team represented the Springfield State College (later renamed Missouri State University) at Springfield, Missouri. In their second season under head coach Red Blair, the Bears compiled a 7–1–1 record (3–1–1 against MIAA opponents) and finished in second place in the Missouri Intercollegiate Athletic Association (MIAA).

Two Springfield players received first-team honors on the 1939 all-conference team: quarterback Dwight Bumpus and end Russell Kaminsky.

Springfield was ranked at No. 201 (out of 609 teams) in the final Litkenhous Ratings for 1939.

Date	Opponent	Site	Result	Attendance	Source
September 29	Tahlequah*	STC Stadium; Springfield, MO	W 12–0		
October 6	Durant*	STC Stadium; Springfield, MO	W 19–14		
October 13	at Maryville	Maryville, MO	L 0–21		
October 21	Kirksville	STC Stadium; Springfield, MO	W 27–0		
October 28	at Rolla	Rolla, MO	W 20–6	2,500	
November 11	at Warrensburg	Warrensburg, MO	T 13–13	4,000	
November 17	Cape Girardeau	STC field; Springfield, MO	W 6–0		
November 23	Hastings	Springfield, MO	W 25–21	3,000	
November 30	Arkansas A&M*	Springfield, MO	W 7–0		
*Non-conference game

=== Rolla ===
1939 Rolla Miners football
- Conference: Missouri Intercollegiate Athletic Association
- Record: 5–4 (3–2 MIAA)
- Head coach: Gale Bullman (3rd season)

The 1939 Rolla Miners football team represented the Missouri School of Mines and Metallurgy (later renamed as Missouri University of Science and Technology) at Rolla, Missouri. In their third year under head coach Gale Bullman, the Miners compiled a 5–4 record (3–2 against MIAA opponents), finished in third place in the MIAA, and were outscored by a total of 120 to 111.

Rolla was ranked at No. 299 (out of 609 teams) in the final Litkenhous Ratings for 1939.

Date	Opponent	Site	Result	Attendance	Source
September 29	at Saint Louis*	Walsh Memorial Stadium; St. Louis, MO	L 0–13		
October 7	Arkansas State*	Rolla, MO	W 39–6		
October 13	Warrensburg	Warrensburg, MO	W 13–7		
October 20	Northwest Missouri State	Rolla, MO	L 0–17		
October 28	Springfield	Rolla, MO	L 6–20	2,500	
November 4	Arkansas A&M*	Rolla, MO	W 28–13		
November 10	at Cape Girardeau	Houck Field Stadium; Cape Girardeau, MO	W 12–6		
November 18	Kirksville	Rolla, MO	W 13–6		
November 25	at Washington University*	Francis Field; St. Louis, MO	L 0–32	6,000	
*Non-conference game

=== Warrensburg ===
1939 Warrensburg Mules football
- Conference: Missouri Intercollegiate Athletic Association
- Record: 3–3–3 (1–2–2 MIAA)
- Head coach: Carl Voltmer (5th season)

The 1939 Warrensburg Mules football team represented the Warrensburg State College (later renamed University of Central Missouri) at Warrensburg, Missouri. In their fifth year under head coach Carl Voltmer, the Mules compiled a 3–3–3 record (1–2–2 against conference opponents), and finished in fourth place in the Missouri Intercollegiate Athletic Association (MIAA).

Warrensburg was ranked at No. 290 (out of 609 teams) in the final Litkenhous Ratings for 1939.

Date	Opponent	Site	Result	Attendance	Source
September 29	Kansas Wesleyan*	Warrensburg, MO	W 14–0		
October 6	at Central*	Fayette, MO	T 6–6		
October 13	Rolla	Warrensburg, MO	L 7–13		
October 20	at Cape Girardeau	Houck Field Stadium; Cape Girardeau, MO	T 0–0		
October 27	at Rockhurst*	Kansas City, MO	W 13–12		
November 3	at Kirksville	Stokes Stadium; Kirksville, MO	W 20–6		
November 11	Springfield	Warrensburg, MO	T 13–13	4,000	
November 17	Maryville	Warresnburg, MO	L 0–12		
*Non-conference game

=== Cape Girardeau ===
1939 Cape Girardeau Indians football
- Conference: Missouri Intercollegiate Athletic Association
- Record: 5–3–1 (1–3–1 MIAA)
- Head coach: Abe Stuber (8th season)
- Home stadium: Houck Field Stadium

The 1939 Cape Girardeau Indians football team represented Cape Girardeau State College (later renamed as Southeast Missouri State University) at Cape Girardeau, Missouri. In their eighth season under head coach Abe Stuber, the Indians compiled a 5–3–1 record (1–3–1 against conference opponents) and finished in fifth place in the Missouri Intercollegiate Athletic Association (MIAA).

Cape Girardeau was ranked at No. 298 (out of 609 teams) in the final Litkenhous Ratings for 1939.

Date	Opponent	Site	Result	Attendance	Source
September 29	Southern Illinois*	Houck Field Stadium; Cape Girardeau, MO	W 9–2		
October 13	at Kirksville	Stokes Stadium; Kirksville, MO	W 9–3		
October 28	Carthage		W 27–6		
November 3	Maryville	Houck Field Stadium; Cape Girardeau, MO	L 0–7		
November 10	Rolla	Houck Field Stadium; Cape Girardeau, MO	L 6–12		
November 17	at Springfield	STC field; Springfield, MO	L 0–6		
November 23	at Southern Illinois	McAndrew Stadium; Carbondale, IL	W 24–0		
*Non-conference game

=== Kirksville ===
1939 Kirksville Bulldogs football
- Conference: Missouri Intercollegiate Athletic Association
- Record: 2–6 (0–5 MIAA)
- Head coach: Malcolm Eiken (1st season)
- Home stadium: Stokes Stadium

The 1939 Kirksville Bulldogs football team represented the Kirksville State Teaches College (also known as Northeast Missouri State Teachers College, later renamed as Truman State University) at Kirksville, Missouri. In their first year under head coach Malcolm Eiken, the Bulldogs compiled a 2–6 record (0–5 against conference opponents) and finished in last place out of six teams in the Missouri Intercollegiate Athletic Association.

Kirksville was ranked at No. 367 (out of 609 teams) in the final Litkenhous Ratings for 1939.

Date	Opponent	Site	Result	Attendance	Source
September 23	at Iowa State Teachers	Cedar Falls, IA	L 0–12		
September 30	Culver–Stockton	Stokes Stadium; Kirksville, MO	W 3–0		
October 6	Chillicothe	Stokes Stadium; Kirksville, MO	W 14–0	2,200	
October 13	Cape Girardeau	Stokes Stadium; Kirksville, MO	L 3–9		
October 21	at Springfield	STC Stadium; Springfield, MO	L 9–27		
November 3	Warrensburg^{†}	Stokes Stadium; Kirksville, MO	L 6–20		
November 10	at Maryville	Maryville, MO	L 13–19		
November 18	at Rolla	Rolla, MO	L 6–13		
^{†}Homecoming

== All-conference team ==
At the end of the season, the conference coaches selected an all-conference team consisting of the following first-team players:

- Backs: Bill Bernau, Maryville; Harvey Ladd, Rolla; Dwight Bumpus, Springfield; Keith Gooch, Warrensburg
- Ends: Russell Kaminsky, Springfield; William Kies, Cape Girardeau
- Tackles: John Green, Maryville; Hay, Cape Girardeau
- Guards: Marion Rogers, Maryville; Richard Rogers, Maryville
- Center: Joe Spafford, Rolla
