= 2009 Lincoln Blue Tigers football team =

American college football season

2009 Lincoln Blue Tigers football
- Conference: Great Lakes Football Conference
- Record: 0–11 (0–4 GLFC)
- Head coach: Nate Cochran (1st season)
- Home stadium: Dwight T. Reed Stadium

2009 Great Lakes Football Conference standings
	Conf.			Overall
Team	W		L	W		L
Saint Joseph's (IN) $	4	–	0	5	–	6
Missouri S&T	2	–	1	4	–	7
Kentucky Wesleyan	2	–	2	2	–	9
Central State (OH)	1	–	2	1	–	10
Lincoln (MO)	0	–	4	0	–	11
$ – Conference champion

The 2009 Lincoln Blue Tigers football team represented Lincoln University of Missouri as a member of the Great Lakes Football Conference (GLFC) during the 2009 NCAA Division II football season. The Blue Tigers were coached by a new head coach, Nate Cochran, who Lemar Parrish at the position. In coach Cochran's first season with the Blue Tigers, the team compiled a record of 0–11. Lincoln went 0–5 in conference play and never managed to score more than 14 points in a game this season. The team also did not score a touchdown until week 5. The Blue Tigers had a -271 point differential (72 scored, 343 allowed) in 2009.

== Schedule ==
Date	Time	Opponent	Site	Result	Attendance	Source
August 29	5:00 p.m.	Upper Iowa*	Dwight T. Reed Stadium; Jefferson City, MO	L 6–65		
September 5	2:00 p.m.	Langston*	Dwight T. Reed Stadium; Jefferson City, MO	L 6–31		
September 12	4:00 p.m.	at Virginia State*	Rogers Stadium; Petersburg, VA	L 6–38		
September 19	2:00 p.m.	Morehouse*	Dwight T. Reed Stadium; Jefferson City, MO	L 0–38		
September 26	12:00 p.m.	at Saint Joseph's (IN)	Rensselaer,IN	L 7–41		
October 3	1:00 p.m.	LaGrange*	Dwight T. Reed Stadium; Jefferson City, MO	L 7–20		
October 1o	2:00 p.m.	Peru State*	Dwight T. Reed Stadium; Jefferson City, MO	L 14–16		
October 17	1:30 p.m.	at Central State (OH)	McPherson Stadium; Wilberforce, OH	L 0–22		
October 31	1:00 p.m.	at Missouri S&T	Allgood–Bailey Stadium; Rolla, MO	L 14–35		
November 7	2:00 p.m.	Kentucky Wesleyan	Dwight T. Reed Stadium; Jefferson City, MO	L 6–21		
November 14	1:00 p.m.	at Mississippi Valley State*	Rice–Totten Stadium; Itta Bena, MS	L 6–16	503	
*Non-conference game; All times are in Central time
