= 2007 Lincoln Blue Tigers football team =

American college football season

2007 Lincoln Blue Tigers football
- Conference: Great Lakes Football Conference
- Record: 2–8 (0–5 GLFC)
- Head coach: Lemar Parrish (3rd season)
- Home stadium: Dwight T. Reed Stadium

2007 Great Lakes Football Conference standings
	Conf.			Overall
Team	W		L	W		L
Tiffin $	5	–	0	9	–	2
Central State (OH) #	3	–	2	5	–	5
Missouri–Rolla	3	–	2	4	–	7
Saint Joseph's (IN)	3	–	2	4	–	7
Kentucky Wesleyan	1	–	4	3	–	8
Lincoln (MO)	0	–	5	2	–	8
$ – Conference champion; # – Provisional NCAA Division II member

The 2007 Lincoln Blue Tigers football team represented Lincoln University of Missouri as a member of the Great Lakes Football Conference (GLFC) during the 2007 NCAA Division II football season. The Blue Tigers were coached by Lincoln hall of famer and former NFL All-Pro, Lemar Parrish. In coach Parrish's third season with the Blue Tigers, the team compiled a record of 2–8. This was an improvement on the previous season's lone win, however Lincoln would go winless in conference play. The Blue tigers improved upon the point differential of the previous season with a -241 point differential (157 scored, 398 allowed) in 2007.

== Schedule ==
Date	Opponent	Site	Result
August 25	at Lane*	Rothrock Stadium / Lane Field; Jackson,TN	L 3–54
September 8	West Virginia State*	Dwight T. Reed Stadium; Jefferson City, MO	L 14–37
September 14	Southern Virginia*	Dwight T. Reed Stadium; Jefferson City, MO	W 39–23
September 22	Langston*	Dwight T. Reed Stadium; Jefferson City, MO	L 7–46
September 29	Haskell Indian Nations*	Dwight T. Reed Stadium; Jefferson City, MO	W 39–20
October 6	at Central State (OH)	McPherson Stadium; Wilberforce, OH	L 19–26
October 13	Kentucky Wesleyan	Dwight T. Reed Stadium; Jefferson City, MO	L 13–35
October 20	No. 24 Tiffin	Dwight T. Reed Stadium; Jefferson City, MO	L 6–57
October 27	at Missouri–Rolla	Allgood–Bailey Stadium; Rolla, MO	L 10–48
November 10	at Saint Joseph's (IN)	Rensselaer, IN	L 7–52
*Non-conference game; Rankings from AFCA Poll released prior to the game
