= Missouri S&T Miners =

- University: Missouri University of Science and Technology
- Nickname: Miners
- NCAA: Division II
- Conference: Great Lakes Valley Conference
- Athletic director: Melissa Ringhausen
- Location: Rolla, Missouri
- Varsity teams: 17
- Football stadium: Allgood–Bailey Stadium
- Basketball arena: Gibson Arena at Gale Bullman Multi-Purpose Building
- Baseball stadium: S&T Ballpark
- Colors: Green and gold
- Mascot: Joe Miner
- Fight song: "Fight, Miners"
- Website: minerathletics.com
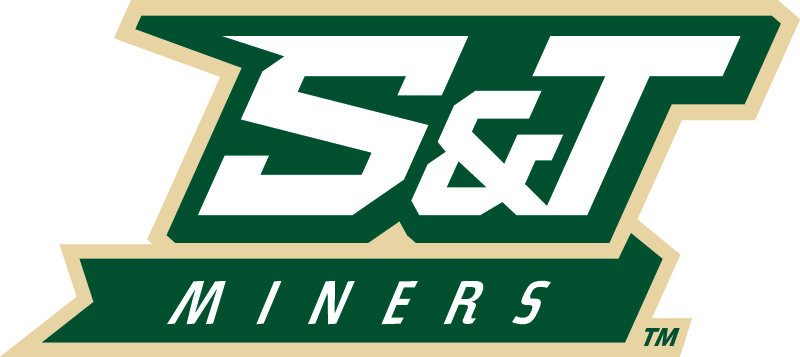

The Missouri S&T Miners (variously S&T or Missouri Miners) are the athletic teams that represent the Missouri University of Science and Technology, located in Rolla, Missouri, in intercollegiate sports as a member of the Division II level of the National Collegiate Athletic Association (NCAA), primarily competing in the Great Lakes Valley Conference (GLVC) for most of its sports since the 2005–06 academic year; its men's swimming team competed in the New South Intercollegiate Swim Conference (NSISC) before the GLVC began to sponsor swimming as a championship sport. Men's volleyball, added in 2022–23, competed as an independent through the 2025 season (2024–25 school year), after which the GLVC will start sponsoring that sport.

The Miners previously competed in the Mid-America Intercollegiate Athletics Association (MIAA) from 1935–36 to 2004–05; and in the Missouri College Athletic Union (MCAU) of the National Association of Intercollegiate Athletics (NAIA) from 1924–25 to 1932–33.

== Overview ==
Until 1964, the school was known as the "Missouri School of Mines", and until 2008 it was the "University of Missouri–Rolla". The nickname "Miner", or a variation of it, is common at mining schools in many states. Missouri S&T's official school colors are silver and gold; the color green has historic relevance and is also used prominently.

== Varsity sports ==
Men's sports	Women's sports
Baseball	Basketball
Basketball	Cross country
Cross country	Soccer
Football	Softball
Golf	Track and field^{†}
Soccer	Volleyball
Swimming	
Track and field^{†}	
Volleyball	
† – Track and field includes both indoor and outdoor

Missouri S&T competes in 17 intercollegiate varsity sports (10 for men, 7 for women): Men's sports include baseball, basketball, cross country, football, golf, soccer, swimming, track & field (indoor and outdoor) (Note: The NCAA classifies indoor and outdoor track & field, both sponsored by S&T for both men and women, as two separate sports. Indoor championships are held in the NCAA's winter season and outdoor championships in the spring season.) and volleyball; while women's sports include basketball, cross country, soccer, softball, track & field (indoor and outdoor), volleyball and spirit squad. Former sports included men's wrestling, women's tennis and women's golf. As of July 2022, men's volleyball became the 17th varsity sport in the 2023 spring season (2022–23 school year).

=== Baseball ===
The baseball team won the GLVC West division title in 2011, 2012 and 2016. The baseball team also won a share of the GLVC regular season title in 2019, tying with Maryville University and Quincy University and won the outright regular season championship in 2026. The Miners won their first GLVC conference championship (GLVC Tournament title) in 2025.

Conference affiliations:

- 1935–2005: Mid-America Intercollegiate Athletics Association
- 2006–present: Great Lakes Valley Conference

Head Coach: Todd DeGraffenreid (2004–present)
Home Field: S&T Ballpark
Uniform Colors: Black and Gold (inception–2007), Green and Gold (2008–present)
MIAA Titles: 1968, 1972
GLVC (West) Titles: 2011, 2012, 2016
GLVC (Regular Season) Titles: 2019, 2026

GLVC (Tournament) Titles: 2025

NCAA Tournament Appearances: 1972, 2011, 2016, 2025, 2026

CSC Academic All-Americans:

- Jeff Mitchell: 1992
- Eric Cummins: 2003
- Steve Hopkins: 2004
- Brandon Cogan: 2009, 2010
- Andy Hall: 2012
- Lee Voth-Gaeddert: 2012
- Nick Ulrich: 2016
- Will Hayes, 2021
- Dylan Mollett, 2024
- Will Beckham, 2025

Missouri S&T baseball records are listed below.

Year	Record	Conference
1966	7–8	3–7
1967	5–7	4–4
1968	6–3	4–3
1969	9–8	3–6
1970	8–12	4–8
1971	8–15	4–8
1972	20–12	9–3
1973	13–15	3–5
1974	6–22	1–11
1975	6–15	2–11
1976	2–18	2–14
1977	17–15	7–10
1978	11–15	4–11
1979	10–14	5–7
1980	14–17	6–6
1981	14–27	3–9

Year	Record	Conference
1982	12–21	5–7
1983	4–20–1	2–8
1984	5–15	3–6
1985	7–16	3–9
1986	6–25	4–8
1987	15–9	7–5
1988	11–17	6–6
1989	9–20–1	3–9
1990	4–18	3–9
1991	5–26–1	0–14
1992	8–19	3–7
1993	4–16–1	2–10–1
1994	8–26	0–15
1995	14–28	3–16
1996	14–23–1	6–11–1
1997	20–19–2	10–13

Year	Record	Conference
1998	13–23	6–16
1999	9–27	4–14
2000	9–32	6–22
2001	21–19	15–13
2002	10–31	10–19
2003	20–19	13–16
2004	16–33	11–20
2005	11–43	6–25
2006	11–41	9–36
2007	20–27	13–24
2008	22–25	15–17
2009	19–33–1	12–16
2010	19–33	14–18
2011	30–19	21–7
2012	32–15	20–10
2013	24–25	22–14

Year	Record	Conference
2014	20–29	14–21
2015	25–26	19–17
2016	39–19	19–9
2017	26–23	16–12
2018	26–26	15–13
2019	30–17	22–11
2020	7–8	2–1
2021	21–21	17–15
2022	20–25	8–16
2023	24–24	15–17
2024	27–22	17–18
2025	32–25	17–15
2026	36–20	25–7

=== Basketball ===
==== Men's ====
The team has won three regular season championships: as a member of the MIAA in 1975–76 and 1995–96, and as a member of the GLVC in 2024–25. The Miners have also made the GLVC Tournament field on seven occasions, and as a member of the MIAA, won the conference tournament in 1996.

Head Coach: Bill Walker (2019–present)
Assistant Coach: Vince Walker (2025–present)

Home Court: Gibson Arena

Conference Regular Season Championships:

MIAA: 1975–76, 1995–96
GLVC: 2024–25

NCAA Tournament Appearances: 1975–76, 1995–96, 2024–25

All-Americans:

- Curtis Gibson: 1984–85
- Duane Huddleston: 1987–88
- Bill Jolly: 1992–93
- Michael McClain: 1995–96

CSC Academic All-Americans:

- Russ Klie: 1977
- Todd Wentz: 1984
- David Moellenhoff: 1986
- Brian Westre: 2002, 2003, 2004
- Bryce Foster: 2014
- Andrew Young: 2025, 2026

Missouri S&T men's basketball records are listed below.

Year	Record	Conference
1909–10	4–2	N/A
1910–11	1–4	N/A
1912–13	3–2	N/A
1914–15	3–5	N/A
1915–16	5–5	N/A
1916–17	1–12	N/A
1917–18	1–8	N/A
1918–19	4–6	N/A
1919–20	3–12	N/A
1920–21	11–5	N/A
1921–22	17–4	N/A
1922–23	7–10	N/A
1923–24	4–9	N/A
1924–25	4–9	N/A
1925–26	3–14	N/A
1926–27	3–13	N/A
1927–28	1–16	N/A
1928–29	2–15	N/A
1929–30	3–15	N/A
1930–31	9–6	N/A
1931–32	7–5	N/A
1932–33	2–11	N/A
1933–34	5–7	N/A
1934–35	8–8	N/A
1935–36	5–10	2–8
1936–37	3–12	2–8
1937–38	2–14	1–9
1938–39	3–14	0–10
1939–40	3–13	1–9

Year	Record	Conference
1940–41	7–12	1–9
1941–42	0–16	0–10
1942–43	7–12	2–8
1943–44	7–6	N/A
1945–46	7–9	2–8
1946–47	6–13	1–9
1947–48	10–9	3–7
1948–49	5–10	0–10
1949–50	7–12	2–8
1950–51	3–16	2–8
1951–52	3–17	2–8
1952–53	2–18	1–9
1953–54	6–13	1–9
1954–55	6–15	0–10
1955–56	5–15	2–8
1956–57	8–13	3–7
1957–58	4–14	1–9
1958–59	5–15	2–8
1959–60	6–17	1–9
1960–61	8–15	1–9
1961–62	7–16	0–10
1962–63	6–16	1–9
1963–64	5–17	0–10
1964–65	11–12	3–7
1965–66	11–8	3–7
1966–67	11–11	3–7
1967–68	13–10	4–6
1968–69	5–17	0–10
1969–70	10–13	2–8

Year	Record	Conference
1970–71	9–13	5–7
1971–72	12–11	7–5
1972–73	15–11	8–4
1973–74	12–12	7–5
1974–75	16–9	8–4
1975–76	18–9	10–2
1976–77	18–8	7–5
1977–78	8–16	1–11
1978–79	9–15	3–9
1979–80	11–14	5–7
1980–81	12–13	4–10
1981–82	12–14	4–8
1982–83	14–12	4–8
1983–84	14–9	4–8
1984–85	13–13	4–8
1985–86	8–17	3–9
1986–87	15–11	5–9
1987–88	12–13	6–8
1988–89	9–16	4–10
1989–90	10–16	7–9
1990–91	13–14	4–12
1991–92	17–9	10–6
1992–93	16–11	10–6
1993–94	11–15	3–13
1994–95	10–16	2–14
1995–96	25–6	12–4
1996–97	14–12	6–12
1997–98	12–15	7–9
1998–99	12–15	6–10

Year	Record	Conference
1999–00	6–19	1–17
2000–01	5–21	3–15
2001–02	13–15	6–12
2002–03	12–15	7–11
2003–04	14–14	7–11
2004–05	10–17	4–14
2005–06	2–25	0–19
2006–07	7–20	2–17
2007–08	3–24	0–19
2008–09	9–17	4–13
2009–10	7–20	3–15
2010–11	7–18	3–15
2011–12	7–20	6–12
2012–13	7–18	3–15
2013–14	12–15	7–11
2014–15	9–17	2–16
2015–16	8–19	4–14
2016–17	12–14	6–12
2017–18	3–23	1–17
2018–19	5–21	3–15
2019–20	6–20	4–16
2021–22	11–17	7–13
2022–23	16–12	10–10
2023–24	15–12	9–11
2024–25	25–6	17–3
2025–26	19–9	13–7

==== Women's ====
The team shared the GLVC West division regular season title in 2011. It reached the championship game of the NCAA Great Lakes Regional in 2008, losing to eventual national champion Northern Kentucky, then made the NCAA Division II Midwest Regional in 2011. The Miners have played in three NCAA Division II Tournaments, having also been in it in 1996 after winning a share of the MIAA regular season championship.

Head Coach: Kira Carter (2020–present)
Assistant Coach: Van Klohmann (2024–present)

Home Court: Gibson Arena

Conference Regular Season Championships: 1995–96 (MIAA)

NCAA Tournament Appearances: 1995–96, 2007–08, 2010–11

CSC Academic All-Americans:

- Jennifer Cordes: 1990
- Jamie Mertens: 1998

Missouri S&T women's basketball records are listed below.

Year	Record	Conference
1974–75	4–7	N/A
1975–76	3–8	N/A
1976–77	8–8	N/A
1977–78	12–7	N/A
1978–79	15–6	N/A
1979–80	13–8	N/A
1980–81	5–17	N/A
1981–82	7–17	N/A
1982–83	7–16	0–12
1983–84	7–17	4–8
1984–85	9–12	3–9
1985–86	6–19	1–11
1986–87	19–8	7–7

Year	Record	Conference
1987–88	11–15	5–9
1988–89	16–9	9–5
1989–90	17–11	11–5
1990–91	17–11	9–7
1991–92	14–13	9–7
1992–93	14–13	8–8
1993–94	17–10	8–8
1994–95	15–12	9–7
1995–96	21–7	12–4
1996–97	8–18	4–14
1997–98	8–18	2–14
1998–99	10–17	4–12
1999–00	7–20	5–13

Year	Record	Conference
2000–01	4–22	1–17
2001–02	2–24	0–18
2002–03	5–20	3–13
2003–04	4–23	0–18
2004–05	9–17	3–15
2005–06	17–11	10–9
2006–07	17–11	10–9
2007–08	24–7	15–4
2008–09	16–13	7–10
2009–10	14–14	8–10
2010–11	20–8	14–4
2011–12	18–9	12–6
2012–13	16–12	11–7

Year	Record	Conference
2013–14	9–18	5–13
2014–15	6–20	2–16
2015–16	8–17	4–14
2016–17	10–16	5–13
2017–18	9–17	4–14
2018–19	9–16	5–13
2019–20	8–19	4–16
2020–21	4–17	4–17
2021–22	11–16	8–12
2022–23	15–14	11–9
2023–24	8–22	5–17
2024–25	15–12	10–10
2025–26	12–14	8–12

=== Cross country ===
==== Men's ====
Head Coach: Cameron Knudsen (2024–present)
Conference Championships:

- MIAA: 1958

All-Americans:

- Ben Mulvaney: 1996–97

CoSIDA Academic All-Americans:

- Matt Hagen: 1999
- Allen Ernst: 2010
- Tyler Percy: 2016
- Andrew Lofgren: 2023
- Lucas Rackers: 2024

==== Women's ====
Head Coach: Cameron Knudsen (2024–present)

CSC Academic All-Americans:

- Kim Finke: 1996
- Kate Hamera: 2003, 2004
- Emma Puetz: 2024

=== Football ===
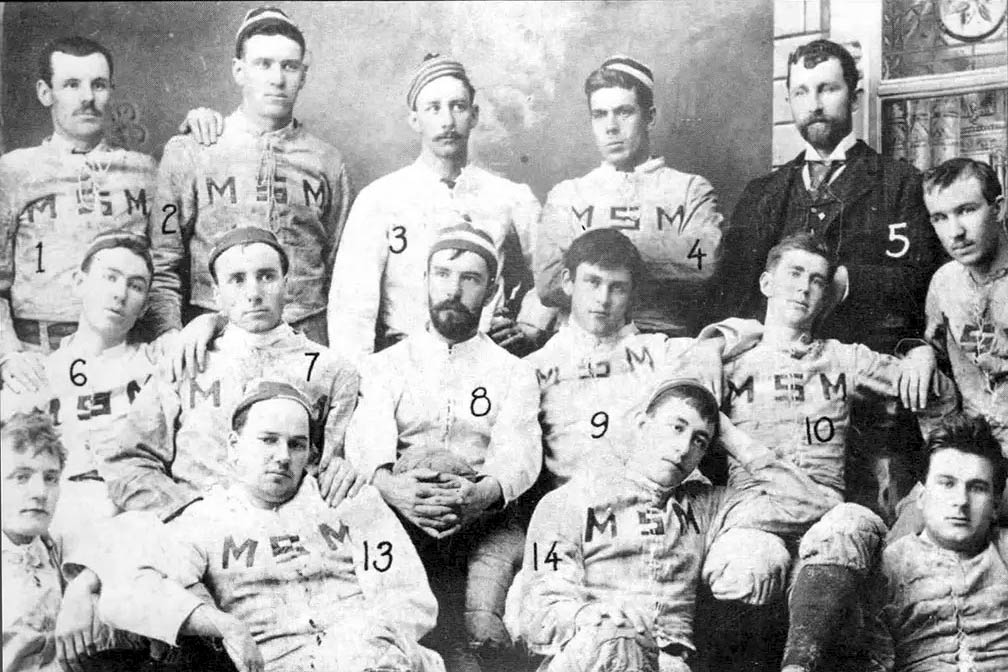
Early Miners football team c. 1893

Conference affiliations:

- 1935–2005: Mid-America Intercollegiate Athletics Association
- 2006–2011: Great Lakes Football Conference
- 2012–present: Great Lakes Valley Conference

Head coach: Andy Ball (2022–present)
Home field: Allgood–Bailey Stadium
Uniform colors: Black and Gold (Inception–2007), Green and Gold (2008–present)

Conference championships: 9

- MIAA: 1941 (Co-Champions), 1947, 1949, 1950, 1956 (Co-Champions), 1977 (Co-Champions), 1980, 1983 (Co-Champions)
- GLFC: 2008

Post-Season Appearances: 1950 (won Corn Bowl over Illinois State 7–6), 2018 (won Mineral Water Bowl over Minnesota State Moorhead 51–16)

=== Golf ===
Head Coach: Connor Benjamin (2025–present)

In fall 2017, the men's golf program returned to Missouri S&T (absent since 2003) and the Missouri S&T women's golf program was created.

At the end of the 2020–2021 academic year, S&T discontinued its women's golf program.

Conference championships: 11

- MIAA: 1938, 1939, 1942, 1947, 1951, 1953, 1954, 1955, 1966, 1969
- GLVC: 2025

NCAA Tournament Appearances: 1969 (12th), 2023 (Tie–8th), 2024 (6th at NCAA Central/Midwest Regional), 2025 (Tie-5th), 2026 (Tie-9th at NCAA Central/Midwest Regional).

All-Americans:

- Carl Miltun: 2022–23
- Gustav Liljedahl: 2022–23
- Connor Benjamin: 2024–25

CSC Academic All-Americans:

- Brian Panka: 1996–97
- Jeppe Thybo: 2022–23, 2023–24
- Carl Miltun: 2022–23, 2023–24
- Connor Benjamin: 2024–25

=== Soccer ===
==== Men's ====
Head Coach: Rob Cummings (2018–present)

Conference affiliations:

- 1981–1988; 1994–1998: Mid-America Intercollegiate Athletics Association
- 2005–present: Great Lakes Valley Conference

Conference championships: 3

- MIAA: 1997 (Co-Champions), 1998
- GLVC: 2010 (Regular season co-champions)

NCAA Tournament Appearances: 2010

All-Americans:

- Spencer Brinkmeyer, 2010
- Patrick McNamee, 2010

CSC Academic All-Americans:

- Chris Shaw: 2003
- Dan Gravlin: 2006
- Trent Doerner: 2011
- Ryan Muich: 2011
- Caleb Collier: 2012
- Adam Stensland: 2012
- Timmy Kenny: 2013
- Ryan Lawhead: 2014, 2015
- David Murphy: 2017
- Paal Benum: 2020–21
- Mike Banasik: 2025
- Joao Vieira: 2025

Missouri S&T men's soccer records are listed below. NOTE: The 2020 season was played in the spring of 2021.

Year	Record	Conference
1979	5–2	N/A
1980	10–5–1	N/A
1981	11–7–1	2–1
1982	11–7–3	1–1–1
1983	10–9	1–2
1984	9–5–4	1–1–1
1985	5–11–1	0–2–1
1986	5–13	1–2
1987	12–7–1	2–3–1
1988	10–8–1	1–4–1
1989	9–6–4	N/A
1990	8–10–1	N/A

Year	Record	Conference
1991	5–9–3	N/A
1992	7–9	N/A
1993	4–13	N/A
1994	7–9–1	2–3
1995	10–6–3	2–2–1
1996	9–9–1	2–2
1997	9–8	3–1
1998	13–4	4–0
1999	10–6–1	N/A
2000	9–7–1	N/A
2001	10–4–2	N/A
2002	9–5–2	N/A

Year	Record	Conference
2003	8–9–2	N/A
2004	7–10	N/A
2005	8–9–3	N/A
2006	9–9–2	7–5–1
2007	6–11–1	3–10
2008	6–9–4	4–4–4
2009	7–7–1	7–5–1
2010	1–6–3	9–2–3
2011	10–6–2	8–5–2
2012	8–6–2	7–6–1
2013	8–8–2	7–6–2
2014	8–8–2	7–6–2

Year	Record	Conference
2015	10–8–2	9–5–1
2016	10–3–6	9–1–5
2017	8–7–3	6–6–2
2018	3–13	3–10
2019	5–10–2	4–9–2
2020	5–8–1	5–8–1
2021	6–8–2	5–7–2
2022	5–7–5	4–4–4
2023	4–9–4	3–7–3
2024	8–6–4	5–5–4
2025	9–6–3	7–5–2

==== Women's ====
Head Coach: Matt Perry (2024–present)

Conference affiliations:

- 1999–2004: Mid-America Intercollegiate Athletics Association
- 2005–present: Great Lakes Valley Conference

CSC Academic All-Americans:

- Denise McMillan: 2001
- Anna Fink: 2014, 2016
- Adriana Benassi: 2025

Missouri S&T women's soccer records are listed below. NOTE: The 2020 season was played in the spring of 2021.

Year	Record	Conference
1982	4–5–2	N/A
1983	10–5	N/A
1984	9–8	N/A
1985	6–11	N/A
1986	12–7	N/A
1987	5–8–2	N/A
1988	3–13–1	N/A
1989	5–13	N/A
1990	1–14–2	N/A
1991	1–14–2	N/A
1992	7–10–1	N/A

Year	Record	Conference
1993	3–14	N/A
1994	12–6–2	N/A
1995	7–11–1	N/A
1996	8–8–2	N/A
1997	15–3–1	N/A
1998	10–7	N/A
1999	10–7–1	3–2
2000	9–8	3–2
2001	4–10–3	3–7–2
2002	1–17	1–11
2003	8–9–3	6–5–3

Year	Record	Conference
2004	3–13–3	1–10–3
2005	4–12–3	1–10–2
2006	4–13–1	3–8–1
2007	6–12–1	2–10–1
2008	7–8–2	3–7–2
2009	5–9–1	5–8
2010	8–7	8–6
2011	5–9–2	5–9–1
2012	6–11	4–11
2013	3–7–5	3–7–5
2014	9–10–1	8–7

Year	Record	Conference
2015	1–14–2	0–13–2
2016	4–10–1	4–9–1
2017	2–13–1	2–11–1
2018	4–11–1	3–9–1
2019	6–8–3	6–7–2
2020	3–9–2	3–9–2
2021	9–6–3	7–4–3
2022	3–8–4	3–7–2
2023	6–8–3	5–7–1
2024	4–11–2	4–8–2
2025	9–6–4	6–5–4

=== Softball ===
Affiliations:

- 1984–2005: Mid-America Intercollegiate Athletics Association
- 2006–present: Great Lakes Valley Conference

Head Coach: Summer Anagnostopoulos (2025–present)
Home Field: Missouri S&T Softball Field

Conference championships: 1

- GLVC: 2024

NCAA Tournament Appearances: 2007, 2024, 2026

CSC Academic All-Americans:

- Jenny Crede: 1993
- Christy Deken: 2004
- Kandi Wieberg: 2007, 2008
- Kaylea Smith: 2013
- Taylor Nelson: 2026

Missouri S&T softball records are listed below.

Year	Record	Conference
1980	7–9	N/A
1981	8–11	N/A
1982	11–18	N/A
1983	7–16	N/A
1984	7–10	1–5
1985	8–19	1–5
1986	5–21	1–11
1987	12–14	3–4
1988	27–12	9–3
1989	18–18	3–7
1990	26–11	6–4
1991	21–20	4–6

Year	Record	Conference
1992	24–24	5–5
1993	22–19	3–7
1994	26–21	6–5
1995	24–25	4–12
1996	29–21	6–10
1997	30–20	5–9
1998	21–18	5–13
1999	11–28	6–12
2000	16–37	5–13
2001	23–33	6–12
2002	13–33	4–14
2003	19–26	7–11

Year	Record	Conference
2004	41–14	13–5
2005	33–25	11–7
2006	33–10	13–7
2007	29–18	13–9
2008	26–21	17–9
2009	21–28	10–12
2010	27–23	16–12
2011	13–29	8–16
2012	15–38	12–24
2013	13–25	12–20
2014	14–33	9–25
2015	11–28	8–22

Year	Record	Conference
2016	16–35	6–24
2017	22–31	14–16
2018	27–27	14–14
2019	15–33	9–17
2020	3–13	N/A
2021	7–35	4–24
2022	24–26	12–16
2023	20–28	11–13
2024	27–34	13–13
2025	19–34	14–14
2026	37–19	22–6

=== Swimming ===
Head Coach: Daniel Murphy (2022–present)
National Finishes:

- 1969–1970: Tie-30th
- 1970–1971: Tie-40th
- 1971–1972: Tie-32nd
- 1972–1973: Tie-44th
- 1973–1974: 29th
- 1974–1975: 13th
- 1975–1976: 13th
- 1976–1977: 8th
- 1977–1978: 22nd
- 1978–1979: Tie-24th
- 1979–1980: 19th
- 1980–1981: 26th
- 1981–1982: 11th
- 1982–1983: 10th
- 1983–1984: 9th
- 1984–1985: 10th
- 1985–1986: 8th
- 1986–1987: 16th
- 1988–1989: 13th
- 1989–1990: 16th
- 1990–1991: 18th
- 1991–1992: 14th
- 1992–1993: 21st
- 1993–1994: 16th
- 1994–1995: 14th
- 1995–1996: 24th
- 1996–1997: 8th
- 1997–1998: 3rd
- 1998–1999: 7th
- 1999–2000: 6th
- 2000–2001: 5th
- 2001–2002: 5th
- 2002–2003: 13th
- 2003–2004: 9th
- 2004–2005: 6th
- 2005–2006: 7th
- 2006–2007: 4th
- 2007–2008: 2nd
- 2008–2009: 3rd
- 2009–2010: 8th
- 2010–2011: 9th
- 2011–2012: 24th
- 2012–2013: 14th
- 2013–2014: 11th
- 2014–2015: 16th
- 2015–2016: 13th
- 2016–2017: 14th
- 2017–2018: 13th
- 2018–2019: 6th
- 2019–2020: 9th
- 2020–2021: 13th
- 2021–2022: 19th
- 2022–2023: 17th
- 2023–2024: 12th
- 2024–2025: 19th
- 2025–2026: 19th

Conference Championships:

- 1973–1974: Missouri Intercollegiate Athletics Association
- 1974–1975: Missouri Intercollegiate Athletics Association
- 1975–1976: Missouri Intercollegiate Athletics Association
- 1976–1977: Missouri Intercollegiate Athletics Association
- 1977–1978: Missouri Intercollegiate Athletics Association
- 1978–1979: Missouri Intercollegiate Athletics Association
- 1984–1985: Midwest Independent Champions
- 1985–1986: Midwest Independent Champions
- 1986–1987: Midwest Independent Champions
- 1988–1989: Midwest Independent Champions
- 1992–1993: Mideast Regional Champions
- 1993–1994: Mideast Regional Champions
- 1994–1995: Mideast Regional Champions
- 1996–1997: Mideast Regional Champions
- 1997–1998: Mideast Regional Champions
- 1998–1999: Mideast Regional Champions
- 2000–2001: Central States Champions
- 2006–2007: New South Champions
- 2007–2008: New South Champions
- 2008–2009: New South Champions
- 2009–2010: New South Champions
- 2010–2011: New South Champions
- 2011–2012: New South Champions
- 2012–2013: New South Champions

CSC Academic All-Americans:

- Jack Pennuto: 2003, 2004
- Bill Gaul: 2005, 2006, 2007
- Andy Shelley: 2006, 2007
- David Calcara: 2008
- Mark Chamberlain: 2008
- Andrew Schranck: 2013
- Keith Sponsler: 2014, 2015, 2016
- Miguel Chavez: 2016
- Stuart Mossop: 2017, 2018
- Tim Samuelsen: 2018, 2020
- Andy Huffman: 2021, 2022
- Adam Wiedemeier: 2025, 2026
- Jordan Christensen: 2026

=== Track and field ===
==== Men's ====
Head Coach: Nikki Segrest (2025–present)
Assistant Coaches: Cameron Knudsen (2024–present)
Conference Championships – Indoor:

- MIAA: 1948
- GLVC: 2009, 2020, 2023

Conference Championships – Outdoor:

- GLVC: 2009, 2014, 2015, 2018, 2021, 2022, 2023, 2024

All-Americans:

- Ryan Sharkey (Javelin Throw): 1986 Outdoors (7th)
- Darren Smith (Long Jump): 1989 Outdoors (6th)
- Tyson Foster (Pole Vault): 1990 Indoors (6th)
- Ray Hawthorne (Long Jump): 1990 Indoors (6th)
- Scott Musgrave (Triple Jump): 1990 Indoors (6th), 1991 Indoors (8th)
- Jeff Hurt (Long Jump): 1993 Outdoors (7th)
- Craig Sorensen (High Jump): 1994 Outdoors (Tie-3rd)
- J.R. Skola (Pole Vault): 2003 Indoors (2nd), 2003 Outdoors (Tie-6th), 2004 Outdoors (Tie-7th), 2005 Indoors (4th)
- Tyrone Smith (Long Jump): 2006 Indoors (4th), 2006 Outdoors (2nd), 2007 Indoors (2nd)
- Lucas Handley (Pole Vault): 2006 Outdoors (6th), 2007 Indoors (3rd)
- Heath Groom (Javelin Throw): 2006 Outdoors (7th)
- Jordan Henry (Pole Vault): 2007 Indoors (7th), 2008 Indoors (Tie-2nd), 2008 Outdoors (4th), 2009 Indoors (2nd), 2009 Outdoors (Tie-5th)
- Jared Anders (Pole Vault): 2008 Indoors (7th), 2010 Indoors (8th)
- Peter Hollenbeck (Pole Vault): 2008 Outdoors (6th), 2009 Indoors (Tie-8th), 2009 Outdoors (4th)
- Dan Hellwig (Pole Vault): 2009 Indoors (Tie-8th), 2010 Outdoors (3rd), 2012 Indoors (6th), 2012 Outdoors (4th)
- Terry Robinson (60-meter hurdles): 2010 Indoors (5th) / (400-meter hurdles): 2010 Outdoors (4th), 2012 Outdoors (7th)
- Bryan Kluge (800-meters): 2011 Outdoors (7th)
- 4x100-meter relay team (team of Sean Martin, Brett Vessell, Mike Wilson, Adriel Hawkins): 2011 Outdoors (8th)
- Adriel Hawkins (200-meter dash): 2014 Indoors (6th)
- Jusean Archibald (110-meter hurdles): 2014 Outdoors (6th)
- Ryan McGuire (Pole Vault): 2016 Indoors (5th)
- Nathan Swadley (Shot Put): 2022 Indoors (6th), 2022 Outdoors (7th), 2023 Indoors (6th), 2023 Outdoors (5th)
- Jacob Luebbert (Weight Throw): 2023 Indoors (4th), 2024 Indoors (7th) / (Hammer Throw): 2023 Outdoors (3rd)
- Owen Fraser (Discus Throw): 2025 Outdoors (National Champion) / (Shot Put) 2026 Indoors (National Champion) / (Weight Throw) 2026 Indoors (6th)
- Otto Knittel (Decathlon): 2025 Outdoors (6th) / (Heptathlon) 2026 Indoors (10th)
- Henry Born (3,000-meters): 2026 Indoors (7th)
- Distance Medley Relay team (team of Andrew Bacon, Otto Knittel, Jack Janovick, Henry Born): 2026 Indoors (6th)

CSC Academic All-Americans:

- Matt Hagen: 1999
- Jordan Henry: 2008, 2009
- Allen Ernst: 2010
- Dan Hellwig: 2012
- Adriel Hawkins: 2014
- Joe Vellella: 2014
- Tyler Percy: 2016
- Lucas Rosenbaum: 2018
- Nathan Swadley: 2021, 2022, 2023
- Nick Janke, 2022
- Jake Anderson, 2023
- Otto Knittel, 2023, 2024
- Andrew Lofgren, 2023
- Owen Fraser, 2024, 2025
- Lucas Rackers, 2024

==== Women's ====
Head Coach: Nikki Segrest (2025–present)
Assistant Coaches: Cameron Knudsen (2024–present)

All-Americans:

- Jackie Kelble (Javelin Throw): 1999 Outdoors (6th)
- Kate Hamera (Mile): 2004 Indoors (7th) / (1,500-meters): 2003 Outdoors (3rd), 2004 Outdoors (6th)
- Whitney Rasmussen (High Jump): 2005 Indoors (Tie-5th)
- Jamie Webb (100-meter dash): 2005 Outdoors (8th)
- Becca Kueny (Javelin Throw): 2006 Outdoors (8th)
- Tamara McCaskill (High Jump): 2009 Outdoors (3rd), 2010 Outdoors (2nd)
- Aubrey Moore (400-meter dash): 2009 Outdoors (8th)
- Taylor Cipicchio (Pole Vault): 2014 Indoors (Tie-4th), 2014 Outdoors (4th)
- Amanda Wetzel (Pole Vault): 2017 Indoors (12th), 2017 Outdoors (3rd)
- Camille Baker (Pentathlon): 2019 Indoors (6th)
- Skyler Ruszkowski (High Jump): 2019 Indoors (7th), 2018 Outdoors (12th)
- Sydney Morris (Shot Put): 2026 Outdoors (10th)

CSC Academic All-Americans:

- Kim Finke: 1996
- Kate Hamera: 2003, 2004
- Becca Kueny: 2006, 2007
- Mary Ann Bradshaw: 2014
- Taylor Cipicchio: 2014
- Katlyn Meier: 2015
- Emma Puetz: 2024

=== Volleyball ===
==== Women's ====
Affiliations:

- Great Lakes Valley Conference: 2007–present

Head Coach: Cooper Martin (2026–present)
Home Court: Gibson Arena
Uniform colors: Black and Gold (2007), Green and Gold (2008–present)

Conference Regular Season Championships:

- GLVC: 2011 (West Division)
- GLVC: 2012 (West Division)
- GLVC: 2020–21 (West Division)

NCAA Tournament Appearances: 2011, 2014, 2023

All-Americans:

- Krista Haslag: 2012 (AVCA 3rd team), 2014 (AVCA honorable mention), 2015 (AVCA honorable mention)
- Shelby Ply: 2023 (AVCA honorable mention)

CSC Academic All-Americans:

- Jennifer Costello: 2011, 2012
- Hayley Wright: 2013
- Krista Haslag: 2015
- Lauren Flowers: 2017

Missouri S&T women's volleyball records are listed below. NOTE: The 2020 season was played in the spring of 2021.

Year	Record	Conference
2007	3–31	2–17
2008	6–27	3–14
2009	10–27	5–9
2010	14–13	7–7
2011	24–10	15–3
2012	20–13	15–3
2013	15–17	10–8

Year	Record	Conference
2014	18–14	12–6
2015	22–11	13–5
2016	11–19	6–12
2017	10–21	3–15
2018	15–15	7–11
2019	21–10	8–7
2020	14–7	12–6

Year	Record	Conference
2021	19–11	12–6
2022	16–9	8–4
2023	18–11	8–5
2024	9–18	5–8
2025	10-17	5-8

==== Men's ====
Missouri S&T began men's volleyball play in the 2023 season (2022–23 school year). Unlike all other S&T teams, men's volleyball is a de facto Division I member. The NCAA's top-level national championship in that sport is open to both D-I and D-II members, and scholarship limits are identical in both divisions. The Miners are competing as an independent through the 2025 season, after which the GLVC will start sponsoring the sport with S&T as one of the eight inaugural teams. Missouri S&T won the first-ever GLVC men's volleyball championship in 2026 by defeating Maryville in the championship game.

Affiliations:

- Great Lakes Valley Conference: 2007–present

Head Coach: Ryan Thompson (2024–present)
Home Court: Gibson Arena
Uniform colors: Green and Gold (2023–present)

Conference Championships:

- GLVC: 2026 (West Division)

Year	Record	Conference
2023	12–9	N/A
2024	10–12	N/A
2025	11–14	N/A
2026	19–6	12–3
