= 1952 Iowa State Cyclones football team =

American college football season

1952 Iowa State Cyclones football
- Conference: Big Seven Conference
- Record: 3–6 (1–5 Big 7)
- Head coach: Abe Stuber (6th season)
- Captains: Carl Brettschneider; Bill Byrus
- Home stadium: Clyde Williams Field

1952 Big Seven Conference football standings
	Conf.					Overall
Team	W		L		T	W		L		T
No. 4 Oklahoma $	5	–	0	–	1	8	–	1	–	1
Missouri	5	–	1	–	0	5	–	5	–	0
Nebraska	3	–	2	–	1	5	–	4	–	1
Kansas	3	–	3	–	0	7	–	3	–	0
Colorado	2	–	2	–	2	6	–	2	–	2
Iowa State	1	–	5	–	0	3	–	6	–	0
Kansas State	0	–	6	–	0	1	–	9	–	0
$ – Conference champion; Rankings from AP Poll

The 1952 Iowa State Cyclones football team represented Iowa State College of Agricultural and Mechanic Arts (later renamed Iowa State University) in the Big Seven Conference during the 1952 college football season. In their sixth year under head coach Abe Stuber, the Cyclones compiled a 3–6 record (1–5 against conference opponents), finished in sixth place in the conference, and were outscored by their opponents by a combined total of 199 to 158. They played their home games at Clyde Williams Field in Ames, Iowa.

The team's regular starting lineup on offense consisted of left end Barney Alleman, left tackle Jack Lessin, left guard Gean Kowalski, center Rollie Arns, right guard Carl Brettschneider, right tackle Bob Matheson, right end Bob Rohwedder, quarterback Rich Mann, left halfback Dick Cherpinsky, right halfback Emory Eichorn, and fullback Max Burkett. Carl Brettschneider and Bill Byrus were the team captains.

The team's statistical leaders included Dick Cherpinsky with 278 rushing yards, Rich Mann with 389 passing yards, Bob Rohwedder with 167 receiving yards, and Stan Cozzi with 24 points (four touchdowns) each. No Iowa State players were selected as first-team all-conference players.

== Schedule ==
Date	Time	Opponent	Site	Result	Attendance	Source
September 20	2:00 pm	South Dakota State*	Clyde Williams Field; Ames, IA	W 57–19	10,241	
September 27	1:30 pm	at No. 5 Illinois*	Memorial Stadium; Champaign, IL	L 7–33	47,702	
October 4	2:00 pm	at Nebraska	Memorial Stadium; Lincoln, NE (rivalry)	L 0–16	35,610	
October 11	2:00 pm	No. 9 Kansas	Clyde Williams Field; Ames, IA	L 0–43	10,101	
October 18	2:00 pm	Colorado^{†}	Clyde Williams Field; Ames, IA	L 12–21	12,214	
October 25	2:00 pm	at Missouri	Memorial Stadium; Columbia, MO (rivalry)	L 0–19	16,160	
November 1	2:00 pm	No. 3 Oklahoma	Clyde Williams Field; Ames, IA	L 0–41	9,619	
November 8	2:00 pm	Drake*	Clyde Williams Field; Ames, IA	W 55–7	8,313–10,000	
November 22	2:00 pm	at Kansas State	Memorial Stadium; Manhattan, KS (rivalry)	W 27–0	11,958	
*Non-conference game; ^{†}Homecoming; Rankings from AP Poll released prior to the game; All times are in Central time
