= 2006 Lincoln Blue Tigers football team =

American college football season

2006 Lincoln Blue Tigers football
- Conference: Great Lakes Football Conference
- Record: 1–8 (1–3 GLFC)
- Head coach: Lemar Parrish (2nd season)
- Home stadium: Dwight T. Reed Stadium

2006 Great Lakes Football Conference standings
	Conf.			Overall
Team	W		L	W		L
No. 22 Tiffin +	4	–	1	10	–	1
Saint Joseph's (IN) +	4	–	1	8	–	3
Central State (OH) #	2	–	1	2	–	5
Missouri–Rolla	2	–	2	6	–	5
Lincoln (MO)	1	–	3	1	–	8
Kentucky Wesleyan	0	–	5	0	–	11
+ – Conference co-champions; # – Provisional NCAA Division II member; Rankings from AFCA poll

The 2006 Lincoln Blue Tigers football team represented Lincoln University of Missouri as a charter member of the newly formed Great Lakes Football Conference (GLFC) during the 2006 NCAA Division II football season. The Blue Tigers were coached by Lincoln hall of famer and former NFL All-Pro cornerback, Lemar Parrish. In coach Parrish's second season with the Blue Tigers, the team compiled a record of 1-8. Lincoln played a strong defensive and efficient offensive game against Kentucky Wesleyan College in week 5, which resulted in a win. However, most other games were blowout losses. The Blue Tigers -382 point differential (57 scored, 439 allowed) is one of the worst in school history for a nine game season.

== Schedule ==
Date	Opponent	Site	Result
August 26	Lane*	Dwight T. Reed Stadium; Jefferson City, MO	L 0–36
September 2	Central Missouri*	Dwight T. Reed Stadium; Jefferson City, MO	L 0–78
September 9	at West Virginia State*	Lakin-Ray Field at Dickerson Stadium; Institute, WV	L 0–16
September 16	Missouri–Rolla	Dwight T. Reed Stadium; Jefferson City, MO	L 7–49
September 23	Kentucky Wesleyan	Dwight T. Reed Stadium; Jefferson City, MO	W 22–10
September 30	at Millsaps*	Harper Davis Field; Jackson, MS	L 10–52
October 14	Saint Joseph's (IN)	Dwight T. Reed Stadium; Jefferson City, MO	L 3–60
October 28	at Langston*	Langston, OK	L 7–76
November 4	at No. 15 Tiffin	Frost–Kalnow Stadium; Tiffin, OH	L 8–62
*Non-conference game; Rankings from AFCA Poll released prior to the game
