= 1946 Missouri Intercollegiate Athletic Association football season =

- Sport: Football
- Number of teams: 6
- Champion: Southeast Missouri State

Football seasons
- ← 1945 1947 →

1946 Missouri Intercollegiate Athletic Association football standings
| | Conf. | | | | | Overall |
| Team | W | | L | | T | W | | L | | T |
|---|---|---|---|---|---|---|---|---|---|---|
| Southeast Missouri State $ | 5 | – | 0 | – | 0 | 8 | – | 0 | – | 1 |
| Missouri Mines | 3 | – | 1 | – | 1 | 4 | – | 3 | – | 2 |
| Kirksville State | 2 | – | 1 | – | 2 | 5 | – | 2 | – | 2 |
| Northwest Missouri State | 2 | – | 3 | – | 0 | 4 | – | 3 | – | 0 |
| Southwest Missouri State | 1 | – | 4 | – | 0 | 2 | – | 6 | – | 0 |
| Central Missouri State | 0 | – | 4 | – | 1 | 4 | – | 5 | – | 1 |
$ – Conference champion

The 1946 Missouri Intercollegiate Athletic Association football season was the season of college football played by the six member schools of the Missouri Intercollegiate Athletic Association (MIAA) as part of the 1946 college football season.

Southeast Missouri State compiled an 8–0–1 record, won the MIAA championship, led the conference in scoring offense and defense, and took six of eleven first-team spots on the 1946 All-MIAA football team.

None of the MIAA teams was ranked in the Associated Press poll or played in a bowl game.

== Conference overview ==
| Conf. rank | Team | Head coach | Conf. record | Overall record | Points scored | Points against |
|---|---|---|---|---|---|---|
| 1 | Southeast Missouri State (Cape Girardeau) | Abe Stuber | 5–0 | 8–0–1 | 200 | 38 |
| 2 | Missouri Mines (Rolla) | Gale Bullman | 3–1–1 | 4–3–2 | 94 | 144 |
| 3 | Northeast Missouri State (Kirksville) | Jim Dougherty | 2–1–2 | 5–2–2 | 120 | 91 |
| 4 | Maryville | Ryland Milner | 2–3 | 4–3 | 63 | 57 |
| 5 | Southwest Missouri State (Springfield) | Red Blair | 1–4 | 3–6 | 76 | 132 |
| 6 | Central Missouri State (Warrensburg) | Judd Dean | 0–4–1 | 2–5–1 | 47 | 111 |

== Teams ==
=== Southeast Missouri State ===
1946 Southeast Missouri State Indians football

MIAA champion
- Conference: Missouri Intercollegiate Athletic Association
- Record: 8–0–1 (5–0 MIAA)
- Head coach: Abe Stuber (14th season)
- Home stadium: Houck Stadium

The 1946 Southeast Missouri State Indians football team was an American football team that represented Southeast Missouri State College at Cape Girardeau, Missouri (later renamed as Southeast Missouri State University) as a member of the Missouri Intercollegiate Athletics Association (MIAA) during the 1946 college football season. In their 14th and final season under head coach Abe Stuber, the Indians compiled an 8–0–1 record (5–0 against MIAA opponents), won the MIAA championship, shut out five of nine opponents, and outscored opponents by a total of 200 to 38.

Southeast Missouri took six of eleven first-team spots on the Associated Press 1946 All-MIAA football team: backs John Griffith and Webb Halbert; end Roscoe Branch; tackle Kenneth Knox; guard William Sapp; and center Donald Anderson. In addition, end Jack Klosterman and tackle Bill Lee were chosen for the second team.

| Date | Opponent | Site | Result | Source |
|---|---|---|---|---|
| September 19 | at Evansville* | Evansville, IN | T 0–0 | |
| September 27 | Arkansas State* | Cape Girardeau, MO | W 8–0 | |
| October 5 | at Southern Illinois* | McAndrew Stadium; Carbondale, IL | W 20–13 | |
| October 11 | at Kirksville State | Kirksville, MO | W 40–12 | |
| October 18 | Central Missouri State | Cape Girardeau, MO | W 40–0 | |
| October 25 | Missouri Mines | Cape Girardeau, MO | W 27–6 | |
| November 1 | Maryville | Cape Girardeau, MO | W 7–0 | |
| November 9 | Hendrix* | Cape Girardeau, MO | W 31–7 | |
| November 16 | at Southwest Missouri State | Springfield, MO | W 27–0 | |
*Non-conference game

=== Missouri Mines ===
1946 Missouri Mines Miners football
- Conference: Missouri Intercollegiate Athletic Association
- Record: 4–3–2 (3–1–1 MIAA)
- Head coach: Gale Bullman (9th season)

The 1946 Missouri Mines Miners football team was an American football team that represented the Missouri School of Mines and Metallurgy at Rolla, Missouri (later renamed as Missouri University of Science and Technology) as a member of the Missouri Intercollegiate Athletics Association (MIAA) during the 1946 college football season. Led by head coach Gale Bullman, the Miners compiled a 4–3–2 record (3–1–1 against MIAA opponents), finished in second place in the MIAA, and were outscored by a total of 144 to 94.

| Date | Opponent | Site | Result | Attendance | Source |
|---|---|---|---|---|---|
| September 20 | at Saint Louis | Walsh Stadium; St. Louis, MO | L 0–24 | 12,533 | |
| September 28 | at Central College | Fayette, MO | W 12–6 | | |
| October 5 | Oklahoma City | Taft Stadium; Oklahoma City, OK | L 6–74 | 4,000 | |
| October 11 | at Central Missouri State (Warrensburg) | West Stadium; Warrensburg, MO | W 20–0 | | |
| October 19 | Maryville | Rolla, MO | W 25–0 | | |
| October 26 | Southeast Missouri State | Cape Girardeau, MO | L 6–27 | | |
| November 2 | Southwest Missouri (Springfield) | Rolla, MO | W 12–0 | | |
| November 9 | Pittsburg State* | Rolla, MO | T 0–0 | | |
| November 16 | Northeast Missouri (Kirksville) | Rolla, MO | T 13–13 | | |
*Non-conference game

=== Northeast Missouri State ===
1946 Northeast Missouri State Bulldogs football
- Conference: Missouri Intercollegiate Athletic Association
- Record: 5–2–2 (2–1–2 MIAA)
- Head coach: Jim Dougherty (1st season)

The 1946 Northeast Missouri State Bulldogs football team was an American football team that represented the Northeast Missouri State College at Kirksville, Missouri (later renamed as Truman State University) as a member of the Missouri Intercollegiate Athletics Association (MIAA) during the 1946 college football season. Led by head coach Jim Dougherty, the Miners compiled a 5–2–2 record (2–1–2 against MIAA opponents), finished in third place in the MIAA, and were outscored by a total of 120 to 91.

| Date | Opponent | Site | Result | Source |
|---|---|---|---|---|
| September 21 | Iowa Wesleyan* | Kirksville, MO | W 19–0 | |
| September 28 | Southern Illinois* | McAndrew Stadium; Carbondale, IL | L 0–6 | |
| October 5 | at Parsons* | Fairfield, IA | W 25–6 | |
| October 11 | Southeast Missouri State | Kirksville, MO | L 12–40 | |
| October 19 | at Southwest Missouri (Springfield) | Springfield, MO | W 26–19 | |
| October 25 | Eureka | Kirksville, MO | W 13–0 | |
| November 1 | Central State (Warrensburg)^{†} | Stokes Stadium; Kirksville, MO | T 0–0 | |
| November 8 | at Maryville | Maryville, MO | W 12–7 | |
| November 16 | at Missouri Mines | Rolla, MO | T 13–13 | |
*Non-conference game; ^{†}Homecoming

=== Maryville ===
1946 Maryville Bearcats football
- Conference: Missouri Intercollegiate Athletic Association
- Record: 4–3 (2–3 MIAA)
- Head coach: Ryland Milner (9th season)

The 1946 Maryville Bearcats football team was an American football team that represented the Maryville State Teachers College (also known as Northwest Missouri State Teachers College, later renamed Northwest Missouri State University) at Maryville, Missouri, as a member of the Missouri Intercollegiate Athletics Association (MIAA) during the 1946 college football season. In their ninth season under head coach Ryland Milner, the Bearcats compiled a 4–3 record (2–3 against MIAA opponents), finished in fourth place in the MIAA, and outscored opponents by a total of 63 to 57.

| Date | Opponent | Site | Result | Source |
|---|---|---|---|---|
| October 4 | Rockhurst | Maryville, MO | W 14–7 | |
| October 11 | Southwest Missouri State (Springfield) | Maryville, MO | W 7–0 | |
| October 19 | at Missouri Mines | Rolla, MO | L 0–25 | |
| October 25 | William Jewell | Maryville, MO | W 20–0 | |
| November 1 | at Southeast Missouri State | Cape Girardeau, MO | L 0–7 | |
| November 8 | Northeast Missouri State | Maryville, MO | L 7–12 | |
| November 15 | at Central Missouri State | Warrensburg, MO | W 15–6 | |

=== Southwest Missouri State ===
1946 Southwest Missouri State Bears football
- Conference: Missouri Intercollegiate Athletic Association
- Record: 3–6 (1–4 MIAA)
- Head coach: Red Blair (7th season)
- Home stadium: SMS Stadium

The 1946 Southwest Missouri State Bears football team was an American football team that represented the Southwest Missouri State College at Springfield, Missouri (later renamed Missouri State University) as a member of the Missouri Intercollegiate Athletics Association (MIAA) during the 1946 college football season. In their seventh and final season under head coach Red Blair, the Bears compiled a 3–6 record (1–4 against MIAA opponents), finished in fifth place in the MIAA, and were outscored by a total of 132 to 76.

| Date | Time | Opponent | Site | Result | Source |
|---|---|---|---|---|---|
| September 20 | 8:00 p.m. | Rockhurst* | Springfield, MO | L 6–12 | |
| October 4 | | Pittsburg State* | SMS Stadium; Springfield, MO | L 0–14 | |
| October 11 | | at Maryville | Maryville, MO | L 0–7 | |
| October 19 | | Northeast Missouri State^{†} | SMS Stadium; Springfield, MO | L 19–26 | |
| October 25 | | Northeastern State* | SMS Stadium; Springfield, MO | W 25–21 | |
| November 2 | | at Missouri Mines | Rolla, MO | L 0–12 | |
| November 8 | | at Central Missouri State | Warrensburg, MO | W 12–7 | |
| November 16 | | Southeast Missouri State | SMS Stadium; Springfield, MO | L 0–27 | |
| | | Northeast Oklahoma A&M | | W 14–6 | |
*Non-conference game; ^{†}Homecoming; All times are in Central time

=== Central Missouri State ===
1946 Central Missouri State Mules football
- Conference: Missouri Intercollegiate Athletic Association
- Record: 2–5–1 (0–4–1 MIAA)
- Head coach: Judd Dean

The 1946 Central Missouri State Mules football team was an American football team that represented the Central Missouri State College at Warrensburg, Missouri (later renamed University of Central Missouri) as a member of the Missouri Intercollegiate Athletics Association (MIAA) during the 1946 college football season. Led by head coach Judd Dean, the Mules compiled a 2–5–1 record (0–4–1 against MIAA opponents), finished in last place in the MIAA, and were outscored by a total of 111 to 47.

| Date | Opponent | Site | Result | Source |
|---|---|---|---|---|
| September 28 | at Pittsburg State | Pittsburg, KS | L 0–12 | |
| October 4 | Central | West Campus Stadium; Warrensburg, MO | W 14–12 | |
| October 11 | Missouri Mines | West Stadium; Warrensburg, MO | L 0–20 | |
| October 18 | at Southeast Missouri State | Cape Girardeau, MO | L 0–40 | |
| November 8 | Southwest Missouri State | West Stadium; Warrensburg, MO | L 7–12 | |
| | Northeast Missouri State | | T 0–0 | |
| | Rockhurst | | W 20–0 | |
| | Maryville | | L 6–15 | |

== All-conference team ==
The Associated Press (AP) selected a 1946 All-MIAA football team consisting of a first team and a second team. The AP selections were as follows:

First team

- Backs: John Griffith, Cape Girardeau; Webb Halbert, Cape Girardeau; Paul Fulop, Rolla; Darrell Gourley, Kirksvile
- Ends: Stan Totoratis, Maryville; Roscoe Branch, Cape Girardeau
- Tackles: Kenneth Knox, Cape Girardeau; Ken Gardner, Kirksville
- Guards: William Sapp, Cape Girardeau; Gale Gulgham, Rolla
- Center: Donald Anderson, Cape Girardeau

Second team

- Backs: Buck Stamp, Warrensburg; Paul Gates, Maryville; Len Crase, Springfield; Gilbert Garafiol, Rolla
- Ends: Jack Klosterman, Cape Girardeau; John Lanahan, Maryville
- Tackles: Bill Lee, Cape Girardeau; Anton Leone, Rolla
- Guards: Dick Kerin, Springfield; Ed Paule, Warrensburg
- Center: John Spainhower, Kirksville
