= 1938 Maryville Bearcats football team =

College football season

1938 Northwest Missouri State Bearcats football

MIAA champion
- Conference: Missouri Intercollegiate Athletic Association
- Record: 9–0 (5–0 MIAA)
- Head coach: Ryland Milner (2nd season)
- Captain: Bill Bernau

1938 Missouri Intercollegiate Athletic Association football standings
	Conf.					Overall
Team	W		L		T	W		L		T
Maryville (MO) $	5	–	0	–	0	9	–	0	–	0
Rolla	3	–	2	–	0	4	–	4	–	0
Springfield (MO)	2	–	2	–	1	5	–	2	–	2
Kirksville	2	–	3	–	0	3	–	5	–	0
Warrensburg	1	–	3	–	1	2	–	5	–	1
Cape Girardeau	1	–	4	–	0	3	–	5	–	0
$ – Conference champion

The 1938 Maryville Bearcats football team, also known as the Northwest Missouri State Bearcats, was an American football team that represented Maryville State Teachers College (later renamed as Northwest Missouri State University) at Maryville, Missouri, as a member of the Missouri Intercollegiate Athletic Association (MIAA) during the 1938 college football season. In their second season under head coach Ryland Milner, the Bearcats compiled a perfect 9–0 record (5–0 against MIAA opponents), shut out six of nine opponents, outscored all opponents by a total of 221 to 26, and won the MIAA championship. Wilbur Stalcup was the assistant coach. The 1938 season was the start of a 21-game winning streak that ended in October 1940.

Bearcat quarterback and co-captain Bill Bernau led the MIAA with 91 points scored and was rated as the conference's best player. Five Bearcats received first-team honors on the 1938 MIAA all-star team: Bernau at quarterback; Stanley Pelc at fullback; B. McLaughlin at halfback; Marion Rogers at guard; and Ed Molitoris at tackle.

== Schedule ==
Date	Opponent	Site	Result	Source
September 23	at Peru State*	Peru, NE	W 33–0	
September 30	Midland*	Maryville, MO	W 20–7	
October 7	at Nebraska Wesleyan*	Lincoln, NE	W 21–12	
October 14	Missouri Mines	Maryville Teachers College Field; Maryville, MO	W 21–0	
October 21	at Springfield (MO)	Springfield, MO	W 7–0	
October 28	at Kirksville State	Kirksville, MO	W 26–7	
November 4	Warrensburg	Maryville, MO	W 13–0	
November 11	Cape Girardeau	Maryville, MO	W 15–0	
November 18	Sioux Falls*	Maryville, MO	W 65–0	
*Non-conference game
