= 1952 Missouri Tigers football team =

American college football season

1952 Missouri Tigers football
- Conference: Big Seven Conference
- Record: 5–5 (5–1 Big 7)
- Head coach: Don Faurot (15th season)
- Home stadium: Memorial Stadium

1952 Big Seven Conference football standings
	Conf.					Overall
Team	W		L		T	W		L		T
No. 4 Oklahoma $	5	–	0	–	1	8	–	1	–	1
Missouri	5	–	1	–	0	5	–	5	–	0
Nebraska	3	–	2	–	1	5	–	4	–	1
Kansas	3	–	3	–	0	7	–	3	–	0
Colorado	2	–	2	–	2	6	–	2	–	2
Iowa State	1	–	5	–	0	3	–	6	–	0
Kansas State	0	–	6	–	0	1	–	9	–	0
$ – Conference champion; Rankings from AP Poll

The 1952 Missouri Tigers football team was an American football team that represented the University of Missouri in the Big Seven Conference (Big 7) during the 1952 college football season. The team compiled a 5–5 record (5–1 against Big 7 opponents), finished in second place in the Big 7, and was outscored by all opponents by a combined total of 159 to 147. Don Faurot was the head coach for the 15th of 19 seasons. The team played its home games at Memorial Stadium in Columbia, Missouri.

The team's statistical leaders included Jim Hook with 741 rushing yards and 1,151 yards of total offense, Tony Scardino with 781 passing yards, Jim Jennings with 219 receiving yards, and Bill Rowekamp with 42 points scored.

== Schedule ==
Date	Opponent	Site	Result	Attendance	Source
September 20	No. 2 Maryland*	Memorial Stadium; Columbia, MO	L 10–13	18,000	
September 27	at No. 8 California*	California Memorial Stadium; Berkeley, CA	L 14–28		
October 4	at Kansas State	Memorial Stadium; Manhattan, KS	W 26–0		
October 11	SMU*	Memorial Stadium; Columbia, MO	L 7–25	25,000	
October 18	at Oklahoma A&M*	Lewis Field; Stillwater, OK	L 7–14		
October 25	Iowa State	Memorial Stadium; Columbia, MO (rivalry)	W 19–0	16,160	
November 1	at Nebraska	Memorial Stadium; Lincoln, NE (rivalry)	W 10–6	39,000	
November 8	Colorado	Memorial Stadium; Columbia, MO	W 27–7	13,500	
November 15	at No. 8 Oklahoma	Oklahoma Memorial Stadium; Norman, OK (rivalry)	L 7–47	43,393	
November 22	No. 18 Kansas	Memorial Stadium; Columbia, MO (Border War)	W 20–19	26,000	
*Non-conference game; Rankings from AP Poll released prior to the game
