= 1952 Oklahoma Sooners football team =

American college football season

1952 Oklahoma Sooners football

Big 7 champion
- Conference: Big Seven Conference

Ranking
- Coaches: No. 4
- AP: No. 4
- Record: 8–1–1 (5–0–1 Big 7)
- Head coach: Bud Wilkinson (6th season)
- Captains: Tom Catlin; Eddie Crowder
- Home stadium: Oklahoma Memorial Stadium

1952 Big Seven Conference football standings
	Conf.					Overall
Team	W		L		T	W		L		T
No. 4 Oklahoma $	5	–	0	–	1	8	–	1	–	1
Missouri	5	–	1	–	0	5	–	5	–	0
Nebraska	3	–	2	–	1	5	–	4	–	1
Kansas	3	–	3	–	0	7	–	3	–	0
Colorado	2	–	2	–	2	6	–	2	–	2
Iowa State	1	–	5	–	0	3	–	6	–	0
Kansas State	0	–	6	–	0	1	–	9	–	0
$ – Conference champion; Rankings from AP Poll

The 1952 Oklahoma Sooners football team represented the University of Oklahoma in the 1952 college football season. It was the 58th season of play for the Sooners. Led by head coach Bud Wilkinson, the Sooners offense scored 407 points, while the defense allowed only 141.

== Schedule ==
Date	Opponent	Rank	Site	TV	Result	Attendance	Source
September 27	at Colorado	No. 4	Folsom Field; Boulder, CO		T 21–21	30,569	
October 4	Pittsburgh*	No. 20	Oklahoma Memorial Stadium; Norman, OK		W 49–20	37,716–38,000	
October 11	vs. Texas*	No. 12	Cotton Bowl; Dallas, TX (rivalry)		W 49–20	75,504	
October 18	at No. 8 Kansas	No. 6	Memorial Stadium; Lawrence, KS		W 42–20	37,946	
October 25	Kansas State	No. 3	Oklahoma Memorial Stadium; Norman, OK		W 49–6	38,168	
November 1	at Iowa State	No. 3	Clyde Williams Stadium; Ames, IA		W 41–0	9,619	
November 8	at No. 10 Notre Dame*	No. 4	Notre Dame Stadium; Notre Dame, IN	NBC	L 21–27	57,466	
November 15	Missouri	No. 8	Oklahoma Memorial Stadium; Norman, OK (rivalry)		W 47–7	43,393	
November 22	Nebraska	No. 5	Oklahoma Memorial Stadium; Norman, OK (rivalry)		W 34–13	42,489	
November 29	at Oklahoma A&M*	No. 4	Lewis Field; Stillwater, OK (Bedlam)		W 54–7	21,408	
*Non-conference game; Rankings from AP Poll released prior to the game

== Rankings ==
Ranking movements Legend: ██ Increase in ranking ██ Decrease in ranking ( ) = First-place votes
	Week										
Poll	Pre	1	2	3	4	5	6	7	8	9	Final
AP	4 (16)	20	12 (1)	6 (5)	3 (23)	3 (20)	4 (27)	8	5 (1)	4 (3)	4 (14)

== Roster ==
- QB Eddie Crowder Sr.
- G J. D. Roberts Jr.
- HB Billy Vessels, Sr.
- E Carl Allison, So.

== Awards and honors ==
- Billy Vessels, Heisman Trophy

== NFL draft ==
Six Sooners were selected in the 1953 NFL draft, held on January 22.

Round	Pick	Player	Position	NFL team
1	2	Billy Vessels	Running back	Baltimore Colts
2	22	Eddie Crowder	Quarterback	New York Giants
3	26	Buck McPhail	Back	Baltimore Colts
4	38	Tom Catlin	Center	Baltimore Colts
15	177	Dick Bowman	Guard	New York Giants
15	180	Tom Carroll	Back	Los Angeles Rams
