= 1944 Maryville Bearcats football team =

College football season

1944 Maryville Bearcats football

MIAA champion
- Conference: Missouri Intercollegiate Athletic Association
- Record: 7–0 (1–0 MIAA)
- Head coach: Ryland Milner (8th season)

The 1944 Maryville Bearcats football team was an American football team that represented Maryville State Teachers College (also known as Northwest Missouri State Teachers College, later renamed as Northwest Missouri State University) at Maryville, Missouri, as a member of the Missouri Intercollegiate Athletic Association (MIAA) during the 1944 college football season. In their eighth season under head coach Ryland Milner, the Bearcats compiled a perfect 7–0 record (1–0 against MIAA opponents), shut out four of seven opponents, and outscored all opponents by a total of 209 to 21. They were ranked at No. 86 among the nation's college and military service teams in the final 1944 Litkenhous Ratings.

The team was led by halfback George W. Campbell who coach Miller called "the classiest back throughout the midwest" and "the best brokenfield runner I've ever seen here."

The season ended on October 13 as coach Milner's efforts to schedule an additional opponent were unsuccessful.

== Schedule ==
Date	Opponent	Site	Result	Source
September 1	Washburn	Maryville, MO	W 27–0	
September 8	at Missouri Valley	Marshall, MO	W 38–0	
September 15	at Pittsburg State	Pittsburg, KS	W 26–13	
September 22	Central Missouri State	Maryville, MO	W 28–6	
September 29	at Peru State	Peru, NE	W 29–0	
October 6	at Washburn	Moore Bowl; Topeka, KS	W 25–0	
October 13	Pittsburg State	Maryville, MO	W 33–2	
