= Ryland Milner =

American football and basketball coach (1909–1999)

Biographical details
- Born: September 24, 1909; Glen Cove, Texas, U.S.
- Died: June 16, 1999 (aged 89); Maryville, Missouri, U.S.

Playing career

Football
- 1929–1932: Northwest Missouri State

Basketball
- 1929–1933: Northwest Missouri State
- Positions: Quarterback (football); Guard (basketball)

Coaching career (HC unless noted)

Football
- 1933–1936: Jackson HS (MO)
- 1937–1957: Northwest Missouri State

Basketball
- 1933–1937: Jackson HS (MO)
- 1943–1950: Northwest Missouri State

Administrative career (AD unless noted)
- 1958–1975: Northwest Missouri State

Head coaching record
- Overall: 90–63–13 (college football); 67–60 (college basketball)

Accomplishments and honors

Championships
- Football; 6 MIAA (1938–1939, 1941–1942, 1948, 1952) Basketball; 1 MIAA regular season (1946)

Ryland Harp "Taffy" Milner (September 24, 1909 – June 16, 1999) was an American football and basketball coach. He was the ninth head football coach at Northwest Missouri State College–now known as Northwest Missouri State University— in Maryville, Missouri, serving for 21 seasons, from 1937 to 1957, and compiling a record of 90–63–13. Milner was the head basketball coach at Northwest Missouri State from 1943 to 1950, tallying a mark of 67–60. He was also the school's athletic director from 1958 to 1975.

Milner attended Classen High School in Oklahoma City, Oklahoma, where was coached by Henry Iba. Milner then attended Northwest Missouri State, where Iba has been appointed head basketball coach in 1929. Milner lettered in football and basketball each for four seasons at Northwest Missouri State. He played football as a quarterback and basketball as a guard. After graduating in 1933, Milner began his coaching career at Jackson High School in Jackson, Missouri before returning to Maryville in 1937, starting as an assistant coach and then in 1944 succeeding Wilbur Stalcup, a fellow Northwest Missouri State alum.

Milner died on June 16, 1999, in Maryville.

== Head coaching record ==
=== College football ===
Year	Team	Overall	Conference	Standing	Bowl/playoffs
Northwest Missouri State Bearcats (Missouri Intercollegiate Athletic Association) (1937–1957)
1937	Northwest Missouri State	2–5–2	1–3–1	5th	
1938	Northwest Missouri State	9–0	5–0	1st	
1939	Northwest Missouri State	9–0	5–0	1st	
1940	Northwest Missouri State	7–2	3–2	2nd	
1941	Northwest Missouri State	6–2–1	3–1–1	T–1st	
1942	Northwest Missouri State	4–2–1	3–1	T–1st	
1943	Northwest Missouri State	5–1–1			
1944	Northwest Missouri State	7–0			
1945	No team—World War II				
1946	Northwest Missouri State	4–3	2–3	4th	
1947	Northwest Missouri State	5–2–2	2–1–2	3rd	
1948	Northwest Missouri State	6–2	4–1	T–1st	
1949	Northwest Missouri State	5–2–1	3–1–1	T–2nd	
1950	Northwest Missouri State	3–5–1	1–3–1	T–4th	
1951	Northwest Missouri State	2–6–1	2–3	4th	
1952	Northwest Missouri State	6–3	4–1	T–1st	
1953	Northwest Missouri State	3–4–1	2–2–1	3rd	
1954	Northwest Missouri State	2–6	1–4	T–4th	
1955	Northwest Missouri State	2–5–1	2–3	T–5th	
1956	Northwest Missouri State	2–7	1–4	5th	
1957	Northwest Missouri State	1–6–1	1–4	6th	
Northwest Missouri State:		90–63–13	45–37–7		
Total:		90–63–13			
National championship Conference title Conference division title or championship game berth
