= 1952 Nebraska Cornhuskers football team =

American college football season

1952 Nebraska Cornhuskers football
- Conference: Big Seven Conference
- Record: 5–4–1 (3–2–1 Big 7)
- Head coach: Bill Glassford (4th season)
- Offensive scheme: Spread
- Home stadium: Memorial Stadium

1952 Big Seven Conference football standings
	Conf.					Overall
Team	W		L		T	W		L		T
No. 4 Oklahoma $	5	–	0	–	1	8	–	1	–	1
Missouri	5	–	1	–	0	5	–	5	–	0
Nebraska	3	–	2	–	1	5	–	4	–	1
Kansas	3	–	3	–	0	7	–	3	–	0
Colorado	2	–	2	–	2	6	–	2	–	2
Iowa State	1	–	5	–	0	3	–	6	–	0
Kansas State	0	–	6	–	0	1	–	9	–	0
$ – Conference champion; Rankings from AP Poll

The 1952 Nebraska Cornhuskers football team was the representative of the University of Nebraska and member of the Big 7 Conference in the 1952 college football season. The team was coached by Bill Glassford and played their home games at Memorial Stadium in Lincoln, Nebraska.

== Before the season ==
Coach Glassford's fourth year at the helm of the Nebraska football program began with a great deal of uncertainty about the future. Lauded after his first two seasons showed dramatic improvement over the string of losing seasons prior to his arrival, the 1951 campaign was a story of a slide backwards, with only one on-field victory recorded during the entire season. A new offense was installed midseason in 1951, styled after the spread offensive look that TCU utilized to great success to defeat Nebraska in the season opener. The offseason provided a chance for the Cornhuskers to refine the new scheme, and 1952 opened with hopes that the previous season would be soon forgotten.

== Schedule ==
Date	Time	Opponent	Site	Result	Attendance	Source
September 20	2:00 pm	South Dakota*	Memorial Stadium; Lincoln, NE	W 46–0	30,000	
September 27	9:00 pm	at Oregon*	Hayward Field; Eugene, OR	W 28–13	24,061	
October 4	2:00 pm	Iowa State	Memorial Stadium; Lincoln, NE (rivalry)	W 16–0	35,610	
October 11	2:00 pm	Kansas State	Memorial Stadium; Lincoln, NE (rivalry)	W 27–14	40,000	
October 18	12:30 pm	at No. 19 Penn State*	New Beaver Field; State College, PA	L 0–10	30,000	
October 25	3:00 pm	at Colorado	Folsom Field; Boulder, CO (rivalry)	T 16–16	30,600	
November 1	2:00 pm	Missouri	Memorial Stadium; Lincoln, NE (rivalry)	L 6–10	39,000	
November 8	2:00 pm	at No. 7 Kansas	Memorial Stadium; Lawrence, KS (rivalry)	W 14–13	33,500	
November 15	2:00 pm	Minnesota*^{†}	Memorial Stadium; Lincoln, NE (rivalry)	L 7–13	40,000	
November 22	2:00 pm	at No. 5 Oklahoma	Oklahoma Memorial Stadium; Norman, OK (rivalry)	L 13–34	42,489	
*Non-conference game; ^{†}Homecoming; Rankings from AP Poll released prior to the game

== Roster ==
Official roster
70 Bingham, Gerald T (Jr.); 75 Boll, Don T (Sr.); 20 Bordogna, John QB (Jr.); 67 Brasee, Carl G (Sr.); 30 Brown, Dan QB (So.); 23 Bryant, Charles G (So.); 18 Cederdahl, James HB (So.); 35 Chamley, Charles HB (So.); 22 Cifra, George FB (So.); 81 Connor, Ted E (Jr.); 66 Curtis, Clayton G (Sr.); 65 Dale, Cliff G (Jr.); 82 Emanuel, Dennis E (Jr.); 73 Evans, Pev T (So.); 56 Gabriel, Don T (So.); 41 Gazinski, Ed FB (So.); 86 Giles, William E (Jr.); 79 Glantz, Don T (So.); 38 Gohde, George FB (So.); 59 Goll, Dick C (Sr.); 15 Goll, Lawrence HB (So.); 71 Goth, Harvey T (Jr.); 69 Griess, Demas G (So.); 44 Hand, Ben HB (So.); 84 Hewitt, Don E (So.); 55 Holloran, William T (So.); 52 Hueneke, Duane T (So.); 77 Husmann, Ed T (Sr.); 88 James, Ted E (Jr.); 54 John, Clinton C (So.); 13 Kennedy, Max HB (Jr.); 74 Kitzelman, Max T (So.)	24 Korinek, Dennis HB (So.); 53 Kripal, Tom G (So.); 43 Levendusky, James HB (Sr.); 89 Loehr, Andy E (So.); 61 Machisic, John G (Sr.); 50 Mink, George E (So.); 76 Minnick, Jerry T (Jr.); 36 Moore, Kenneth QB (So.); 64 Morgan, Russell G (Jr.); 17 Novak, Ray FB (Jr.); 58 Oberlin, Bob C (So.); 78 Oliver, Jim T (Jr.); 63 Paulson, Jerry G (Jr.); 80 Paynich, George E (Sr.); 68 Prochaska, George G (Sr.); 16 Radik, Emil HB (So.); 37 Rankin, Duane QB (So.); 83 Reiners, Ken E (So.); 12 Reynolds, Bobby HB (Sr.); 26 Rolston, Dirkes HB (So.); 85 Schabacker, William E (Jr.); 51 Scott, Verl C (Sr.); 72 Sebold, John T (So.); 21 Smith, Robert HB (So.); 40 Sommers, James HB (Sr.); 14 Thayer, Bill HB (So.); 42 Thorell, Stuart FB (So.); 57 Watson, Dick C (So.); 49 Whitney, Grant C (So.); 62 Winey, Leo G (Sr.); 87 Yeager, Jerry E (Jr.); 34 Yeisley, James HB (So.)

== Coaching staff ==
Name	Title	First year in this position	Years at Nebraska	Alma mater
Bill Glassford	Head coach	1949	1949–1955	Pittsburgh
L. F. "Pop" Klein	Assistant coach	1945	1945–1958	
Ray Prochaska	Ends coach	1950	1947–1948, 1950–1954	Nebraska
Ike Hanscomb	B-Squad coach	1948	1948–1953	
Bob Davis	Backfield coach	1949	1949–1955	
Peter Janetos	Freshman coach	1949	1949–1952	
Ralph Fife	Offensive line coach	1950	1950–1952	
Robert Faris	Freshman coach	1952	1952–1954	

== Game summaries ==
=== South Dakota ===
Team	1	2	Total
South Dakota			0
• Nebraska			46

- Date: September 20
- Location: Memorial Stadium • Lincoln, Nebraska
- Game attendance: 30,000

South Dakota was the first team to see Nebraska since the spread had been formally and completely installed, and the Coyotes were bowled over by a scoring explosion and defensive stand that wrapped up the day with a commanding 46–0 shutout to start the Cornhusker season on the right foot. The Coyotes managed only 4 first downs for the night, compared with 29 for the Nebraska squad, and were dominated in passing yardage 118–0. The score would have been much more damaging if not for the 120 penalty yards accumulated by the Cornhuskers, fully twice as many as assessed against South Dakota. The Coyotes had now failed to get a win against Nebraska in their previous thirteen attempts, their only past success being the first meeting of the teams back in 1899.

=== Oregon ===
Team	1	2	Total
• Nebraska			28
Oregon			13

- Date: September 27
- Location: Hayward Field • Eugene, Oregon
- Game attendance: 24,061

Nebraska made the long journey to Eugene to face off against the Oregon Ducks for the first time, in a rare night time game. Oregon was favored, and had a daunting aerial attack plan that put the Cornhusker defense to the test by rolling up 134 yards to Nebraska's 32 by air. However, faced with a Nebraska rushing onslaught of 280 yards that dwarfed the 75 managed by the Ducks, Oregon was unable to step the string of points rolled off by the Cornhusker machine. Memories of 1951 were fading fast, as Nebraska was quickly off to a good 2–0 start.

=== Iowa State ===
Team	1	2	Total
Iowa State			0
• Nebraska			16

- Date: October 4
- Location: Memorial Stadium • Lincoln, Nebraska
- Game attendance: 37,000

The Cornhuskers recorded their second shutout of the season in three games against Iowa State despite an uninspired outing that brought in only 16 points for the day. Much like the Ducks, Iowa State attempted to get yards by air, throwing for 124 yards and easily out-passing Nebraska's 39, but the ground game ruled the day again as the Cornhusker rushing yardage steamrolled the Cyclone total by 351–85. The second shutout of the season marked the best Nebraska batch of shutouts since 1933 opened with three straight blankings. Iowa State fell to 8–37–1 against the Cornhuskers all-time.

=== Kansas State ===
Team	1	2	Total
Kansas State			14
• Nebraska			27

- Date: October 11
- Location: Memorial Stadium • Lincoln, Nebraska
- Game attendance: 40,000

Another display of Nebraska's ground domination in the face of aerial attacks was on display in Lincoln as the Kansas State team sought to end their nine-year stretch of futility against the Cornhuskers. The Wildcats outgained Nebraska in the air by 204–74, but could not come up with the points to match the statistics as the Cornhuskers outrushed Kansas State 251–73 and produced nearly twice as many points. It was a hard-fought game that resulted in numerous injuries to Nebraska players, including star HB Bobby Reynolds, who came out with a separated shoulder. The Cornhuskers improved to 30–4–2 over the Wildcats to date.

=== Penn State ===
Team	1	2	3	4	Total
Nebraska	0	0	0	0	0
• #19 Penn State	0	0	7	3	10

- Date: October 18
- Location: New Beaver Field, State College, Pennsylvania
- Game attendance: 30,000

Statistically, the Penn State contest looked like most of the others of 1952, as Nebraska outgained the Nittany Lions by ground 210–129. The first half ended scoreless thanks to a stiff defensive Cornhusker effort that turned Penn State away empty-handed from inside the 20 yard line on three drives. Penn State was the first to find success against Nebraska by air, actually producing points instead of simply winning the passing battle, as their 102–45 air advantage helped them finally punch in a touchdown in the third quarter before sealing the outcome with a late field goal. It was the first Cornhusker loss of the season as the year now stood at 4–1, which was nonetheless the best beginning os a Nebraska football season since the 6–0 start in 1933. With the loss handed down, the Cornhuskers slipped to 1–4 versus the Nittany Lions all-time.

=== Colorado ===
Team	1	2	Total
Nebraska			16
Colorado			16

- Date: October 25
- Location: Folsom Field • Boulder, Colorado
- Game attendance: 30,600

Upstart Colorado was not to be overlooked, as they had fought reigning Big 7 champion Oklahoma to a tied outcome earlier in the year. Every way to score points in a football game was recorded in this contest across both teams, as Nebraska fought back from 0–7 to make a game of it. The final score of 16–16 was settled upon when injured Nebraska HB Bobby Reynolds attempted a field goal that was blocked with, fittingly, 16 seconds remaining to play. Colorado's two-game winning streak against Nebraska was cut short as the Cornhuskers improved over the Buffaloes to 7–4 in the series.

=== Missouri ===
Team	1	2	Total
• Missouri			10
Nebraska			6

- Date: November 1
- Location: Memorial Stadium • Lincoln, Nebraska
- Game attendance: 39,000

Nebraska scored early on in the contest but struggled to put a scoring distance in the pull away. The score held at 6–0 through the half time break, until an ill-timed Cornhusker fumbled was scooped up by the Tigers and returned for a touchdown. The Missouri extra point made it 6–7, and though the Cornhuskers advance repeatedly into Tiger territory over the course of the game, Missouri successfully turned them away from inside the 25-yard line on four occasions. A late Tiger field goal put the game away, handing down the season's second defeat upon Nebraska. Missouri narrowed the series to 17–25–3 and kept the Victory bell in Columbia for another year.

=== Kansas ===
Team	1	2	Total
• Nebraska			14
#7 Kansas			13

- Date: November 8
- Location: Memorial Stadium • Lawrence, Kansas
- Game attendance: 33,500
- Game weather: Rain

Facing Kansas in Lawrence, the Cornhuskers struggled to make headway against the Jayhawks for much of the game, basically giving up on the air attack with only seven net passing yards on the day. Trailing by six points with only five minutes remaining, the Cornhuskers finally found a way around the Jayhawks line and into the end zone, the point after finally giving Nebraska the lead and the win. Nebraska's win padded the series to 42–13–3.

=== Minnesota ===
Team	1	2	Total
• Minnesota			13
Nebraska			7

- Date: November 15
- Location: Memorial Stadium • Lincoln, Nebraska
- Game attendance: 40,000

Nebraska secured 16 first downs compared to the 13 recorded by Minnesota, and outrushed the Golden Gophers 313–157 in front of the Lincoln homecoming crowd, but Minnesota brought dazzling plays of their own and entirely shut out Nebraska's attempts to throw, leading to a dismal Nebraska passing attempts record of 0–8 and no air yards for the day. The Golden Gophers did not have the same troubles by air, and rolled up 166 passing yards on their way to a relatively narrow 6-point win to hand over Nebraska's third loss of the season, improving over the Cornhuskers to 27–5–2.

=== Oklahoma ===
Team	1	2	Total
Nebraska			13
• #5 Oklahoma			34

- Date: November 22
- Location: Oklahoma Memorial Stadium • Norman, Oklahoma
- Game attendance: 41,000

Oklahoma's winning ways in the Big 7 continued without pause as Nebraska surrendered for a record 10th-straight game to the Sooners, in front of a large homecoming crowd of 41,000 in Norman. The game was never really in doubt after Oklahoma punched in a quick succession of scores in the first quarter to jump to a 20–0 lead. Finally, the Cornhuskers came to life and played Oklahoma 13–14 for the remaining duration, but the Sooners were far too strong to be overcome. Nebraska's lead in the series dwindled to 16–13–3.

== After the season ==
The season opened strong with four wins a row, the best commencement of a football season in Nebraska in nearly twenty years. Injuries began to take their toll, however, and the new spread offense was less foreign to opposing teams who began to figure out how to defend against it, particularly since Nebraska remained predominantly a ground-based rushing team. As a result, the bright start to the season faded as the Cornhuskers closed out 1952 at 1–4–1. Coach Glassford's 1952 campaign total still helped push his conference record to a barely winning percentage of 12–11–1 (.521) but his overall record was still on the wrong side, at 17–19–2 (.474). The Nebraska football program's conference and overall records both slipped slightly, as the 3–2–1 Big 7 results brought the league record to 132–48–12 (.719) and the program's all-time percentage now stood at 333–167–33 (.656).

== Future NFL and other professional league players ==
- Don Boll, 1953 4th-round pick of the Washington Redskins
- Charley Bryant, 1955 24th-round pick of the Green Bay Packers
- Ted Connor, 1954 3rd-round pick of the Philadelphia Eagles
- Don Glantz, 1955 5th-round pick of the Washington Redskins
- Ed Husmann, 1953 9th-round pick of the Chicago Cardinals
- Jerry Minnick, 1954 9th-round pick of the Washington Redskins
- Ray Novak, 1954 14th-round pick of the Detroit Lions
- Bobby Reynolds, 1953 7th-round pick of the Los Angeles Rams
- Bob Smith, 1955 15th-round pick of the Cleveland Browns
