= 1952 Kansas State Wildcats football team =

American college football season

1952 Kansas State Wildcats football
- Conference: Big Seven Conference
- Record: 1–9 (0–6 Big 7)
- Head coach: Bill Meek (2nd season)
- Home stadium: Memorial Stadium

1952 Big Seven Conference football standings
	Conf.					Overall
Team	W		L		T	W		L		T
No. 4 Oklahoma $	5	–	0	–	1	8	–	1	–	1
Missouri	5	–	1	–	0	5	–	5	–	0
Nebraska	3	–	2	–	1	5	–	4	–	1
Kansas	3	–	3	–	0	7	–	3	–	0
Colorado	2	–	2	–	2	6	–	2	–	2
Iowa State	1	–	5	–	0	3	–	6	–	0
Kansas State	0	–	6	–	0	1	–	9	–	0
$ – Conference champion; Rankings from AP Poll

The 1952 Kansas State Wildcats football team represented Kansas State University in the 1952 college football season. The team's head football coach was Bill Meek, in his second year at the helm of the Wildcats. The Wildcats played their home games in Memorial Stadium. The Wildcats finished the season with a 1–9 record with a 0–6 record in conference play. They finished in last place in the Big Seven Conference for the fifth consecutive year. The Wildcats scored just 81 points and gave up 255 points.

== Schedule ==
Date	Opponent	Site	Result	Attendance	Source
September 20	Bradley*	Memorial Stadium; Manhattan, KS	W 21–7	12,000	
September 27	at Cincinnati*	Nippert Stadium; Cincinnati, OH	L 6–13		
October 4	Missouri^{†}	Memorial Stadium; Manhattan, KS	L 0–26	15,000	
October 11	at Nebraska	Memorial Stadium; Lincoln, NE (rivalry)	L 14–27	40,000	
October 18	at Tulsa*	Skelly Stadium; Tulsa, OK	L 7–26	12,500	
October 25	at No. 3 Oklahoma	Oklahoma Memorial Stadium; Norman, OK	L 6–49	38,168	
November 1	No. 9 Kansas	Memorial Stadium; Manhattan, KS (rivalry)	L 6–26	16,500	
November 8	Wyoming*	Memorial Stadium; Manhattan, KS	L 7–20	8,000	
November 15	at Colorado	Folsom Field; Boulder, CO (rivalry)	L 14–34	20,553	
November 22	Iowa State	Memorial Stadium; Manhattan, KS (rivalry)	L 0–27	11,958	
*Non-conference game; ^{†}Homecoming; Rankings from AP Poll released prior to the game
