= 1952 Colorado Buffaloes football team =

American college football season

1952 Colorado Buffaloes football
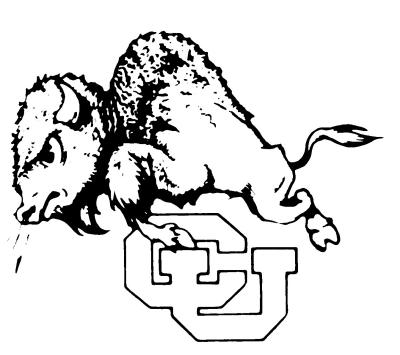
- Conference: Big Seven Conference
- Record: 6–2–2 (2–2–2 Big 7)
- Head coach: Dallas Ward (5th season)
- Offensive scheme: Single-wing
- Base defense: 6–3–2
- Captain: Game captains
- Home stadium: Folsom Field

1952 Big Seven Conference football standings
	Conf.					Overall
Team	W		L		T	W		L		T
No. 4 Oklahoma $	5	–	0	–	1	8	–	1	–	1
Missouri	5	–	1	–	0	5	–	5	–	0
Nebraska	3	–	2	–	1	5	–	4	–	1
Kansas	3	–	3	–	0	7	–	3	–	0
Colorado	2	–	2	–	2	6	–	2	–	2
Iowa State	1	–	5	–	0	3	–	6	–	0
Kansas State	0	–	6	–	0	1	–	9	–	0
$ – Conference champion; Rankings from AP Poll

The 1952 Colorado Buffaloes football team was an American football team that represented the University of Colorado as a member of the Big Seven Conference during the 1952 college football season. Led by fifth-year head coach Dallas Ward, the Buffaloes compiled an overall record of 6–2–2 with a mark of 2–2–2 in conference play, tying for fourth place in the Big 7. The team played its home games on campus at Folsom Field in Boulder, Colorado.

== Schedule ==
Date	Time	Opponent	Site	Result	Attendance	Source
September 20		San Jose State*	Folsom Field; Boulder, CO	W 20–14	19,998	
September 27		No. 4 Oklahoma	Folsom Field; Boulder, CO	T 21–21	30,732	
October 4	1:00 p.m.	at No. 9 Kansas	Memorial Stadium; Lawrence, KS	L 12–21	32,500	
October 11		at Arizona*	Arizona Stadium; Tucson, AZ	W 34–19	24,500	
October 18		at Iowa State	Clyde Williams Field; Ames, IA	W 21–12	15,000	
October 25		Nebraska	Folsom Field; Boulder, CO (rivalry)	T 16–16	31,316	
November 1	2:00 p.m.	at Utah*	Ute Stadium; Salt Lake City, UT (rivalry)	W 20–14	15,300	
November 8		at Missouri	Memorial Stadium; Columbia, MO	L 7–27	13,500	
November 15		Kansas State^{†}	Folsom Field; Boulder, CO (rivalry)	W 34–14	20,553	
November 29		Colorado A&M*	Folsom Field; Boulder, CO (rivalry)	W 61–0	12,393–20,882	
*Non-conference game; ^{†}Homecoming; Rankings from AP Poll released prior to the game; All times are in Mountain time

== NFL draft ==
Senior defensive back Tom Brookshier was selected in the tenth round of the 1953 NFL draft and played with the Philadelphia Eagles until 1961; he was a longtime NFL broadcaster with CBS. Junior tight end Gary Knafelc was taken in the second round of the 1954 NFL draft with 14th overall pick and played ten seasons in the NFL, mostly with the Green Bay Packers.

The following Buffaloes were selected in 1953 NFL draft following the season.

Round	Pick	Player	Position	NFL club
7	80	Don Branby	End	New York Giants
10	117	Tom Brookshier	Back	Philadelphia Eagles
19	227	Tom Cain	Guard	Cleveland Browns
28	331	Zack Jordan	Back	Green Bay Packers
