= 1952 Kansas Jayhawks football team =

American college football season

1952 Kansas Jayhawks football
- Conference: Big Seven Conference
- Record: 7–3 (3–3 Big 7)
- Head coach: Jules V. Sikes (5th season)
- Captains: Charlie Hoag; Oliver Spencer
- Home stadium: Memorial Stadium

1952 Big Seven Conference football standings
	Conf.					Overall
Team	W		L		T	W		L		T
No. 4 Oklahoma $	5	–	0	–	1	8	–	1	–	1
Missouri	5	–	1	–	0	5	–	5	–	0
Nebraska	3	–	2	–	1	5	–	4	–	1
Kansas	3	–	3	–	0	7	–	3	–	0
Colorado	2	–	2	–	2	6	–	2	–	2
Iowa State	1	–	5	–	0	3	–	6	–	0
Kansas State	0	–	6	–	0	1	–	9	–	0
$ – Conference champion; Rankings from AP Poll

The 1952 Kansas Jayhawks football team represented the University of Kansas in the Big Seven Conference during the 1952 college football season. In their fifth season under head coach Jules V. Sikes, the Jayhawks compiled a 7–3 record (3–3 against conference opponents), finished fourth in the Big Seven Conference, and outscored all opponents by a combined total of 214 to 110. They played their home games at Memorial Stadium in Lawrence, Kansas.

The team's statistical leaders included Charlie Hoag with 469 rushing yards, Bob Brandeberry with 54 points scored, and Jerry Robertson with 868 passing yards. Hoag and Oliver Spencer were the team captains.

== Schedule ==
Date	Time	Opponent	Rank	Site	TV	Result	Attendance	Source
September 20		No. 9 TCU*	No. 17	Memorial Stadium; Lawrence, KS	NBC	W 13–0	25,000	
September 27		Santa Clara*	No. 17	Memorial Stadium; Lawrence, KS		W 21–9	25,579	
October 4	2:00 p.m.	Colorado	No. 9	Memorial Stadium; Lawrence, KS		W 21–12	32,500	
October 11		at Iowa State	No. 9	Clyde Williams Field; Ames, IA		W 43–0	10,101	
October 18		No. 6 Oklahoma	No. 8	Memorial Stadium; Lawrence, KS		L 20–42	37,946	
October 25		at SMU*	No. 15	Cotton Bowl; Dallas, TX		W 26–0	30,000–33,000	
November 1		at Kansas State	No. 9	Memorial Stadium; Manhattan, KS (rivalry)		W 26–6	16,500	
November 8		Nebraska^{†}	No. 7	Memorial Stadium; Lawrence, KS (rivalry)		L 13–14	33,500	
November 15		Oklahoma A&M*	No. 19	Memorial Stadium; Lawrence, KS		W 12–7	20,000	
November 22		at Missouri	No. 18	Memorial Stadium; Columbia, MO (Border War)		L 19–20	26,000	
*Non-conference game; ^{†}Homecoming; Rankings from AP Poll released prior to the game; All times are in Central time
