= Lemar Parrish =

American football player and coach (born 1947)

- Parrish in 1972 stamp

No. 20, 24
- Positions: Cornerback, return specialist

Personal information
- Born: December 13, 1947 (age 78); West Palm Beach, Florida, U.S.
- Listed height: 5 ft 11 in (1.80 m)
- Listed weight: 185 lb (84 kg)

Career information
- High school: John F. Kennedy (Riviera Beach, Florida)
- College: Lincoln (MO) (1966–1969)
- NFL draft: 1970: 7th round, 163rd overall pick

Career history

Playing
- Cincinnati Bengals (1970–1977); Washington Redskins (1978–1981); Buffalo Bills (1982)

Coaching
- Lincoln (MO) (2005–2008) Head coach

Awards and highlights
- 3× First-team All-Pro (1976, 1979, 1980); 2× Second-team All-Pro (1974, 1975); 8× Pro Bowl (1970, 1971, 1974–1977, 1979, 1980); Cincinnati Bengals 40th Anniversary Team; Cincinnati Bengals 50th Anniversary Team; Cincinnati Bengals Ring of Honor; Lincoln Blue Tigers No. 20 retired

Career NFL statistics
- Interceptions: 47
- Interception yards: 462
- Fumble recoveries: 13
- Return yards: 2,709
- Total touchdowns: 13
- Stats at Pro Football Reference

Head coaching record
- Career: 7–31 (.184)

Lemar R. Parrish (born December 13, 1947), nicknamed Leapin' Lemar, is an American former professional football player who was a cornerback and return specialist in the National Football League (NFL). He played college football for the Lincoln Blue Tigers. He was selected in the seventh round of the 1970 NFL draft and played for the Cincinnati Bengals (1970–1977), Washington Redskins (1978–1982) and Buffalo Bills (1982). Parrish was named to eight Pro Bowls.

== Early life ==
Lemar R. Parrish was born on December 13, 1947, in West Palm Beach, Florida. He played football and graduated from John F. Kennedy High School in Riviera Beach, Florida.

== College career ==
He played college football for Lincoln University of Missouri in Jefferson City, Missouri. He was a running back and a four-year letter-winner from 1966 to 1969. In 1969, he set the school's record for longest punt return when he returned a punt 95 yards for a touchdown against Southwest Missouri State University. He also set school records for most punt return yards in a game (129 yards on three returns) and highest average per punt return in that game (43 yards per return). That year, Parrish averaged 16.8 yards per punt return. That, and his career average of 15.5 yards per return, are still school records. He was named All-American in 1969.

== Professional career ==
=== Cincinnati Bengals ===
After graduating college, he was selected by the Bengals in the seventh round of the 1970 NFL draft with the 163rd overall pick. Parrish immediately made an impact, not just as a defensive back but also as a kick returner on special teams.

In his 1970 rookie season, Parrish recorded five interceptions, one fumble recovery, 194 yards returning punts, 482 yards returning kickoffs, and scored two touchdowns (one kickoff return and one blocked field goal return). His 482 kickoff return yards came on just 16 returns, a whopping 30.1 yards per return average.

In 1974, Parrish set a franchise record with an NFL-leading 18.8 yards per punt return average (18 returns for 338 yards). In his eight seasons with the Bengals, Parrish was selected to the Pro Bowl six times (1970, 1971, 1974–1977).

After the 1977 season, Parrish got into a contract dispute with the Bengals, and was traded to the Redskins.

Parrish left the Bengals as the team's all-time leader in touchdowns scored by "return or recovery" with 13 (four on punt returns, four on interception returns, three on fumble returns, one on a kickoff return, and one on a blocked field goal return). He was also the only player in franchise history ever to score two "return or recovery" touchdowns in a single game, a feat he accomplished three times.

In a 1970 game against the Bills, he scored touchdowns on a 95-yard kickoff return and an 83-yard blocked field goal return. In a 1972 game against the Houston Oilers, he scored touchdowns on interception returns of 25 and 33 yards. In a 1974 game against Washington, he scored touchdowns on a 93-yard punt return and 47-yard fumble return.

Parrish also left as the Bengals' all-time leader in punt return yards with 1,201, and held the franchise record for punt return yards in a season with 338 in 1974.

=== Washington Redskins ===
With the Redskins, Parrish was no longer used as a kick returner, but he still made a big impact, recording nine interceptions in his first year with them, and seven the year after that. He made the Pro Bowl two more times with Washington, in 1979 and 1980. Parrish played with Redskins until 1981.

=== Buffalo Bills ===
Parrish spent his final season with Bills before retiring in 1982.

== Legacy ==
Parrish was known for his charismatic personality and attire, which included gold teeth, a flashy wardrobe, and a "Cadillac trimmed in lavender." In his thirteen NFL seasons, he recorded 47 interceptions for 462 yards, thirteen fumble recoveries for 65 return yards, 131 punt returns for 1,205 yards, 61 kickoffs for 1,504 yards, and thirteen touchdowns. He is one of twenty defensive backs to be selected to eight Pro Bowls. At the time of his retirement, he was tied for 15th all-time in interceptions, for which he has been passed over by dozens of players in the years since retirement. In 1997, The Cincinnati Enquirer said that Parrish hurt his chances for more interceptions by "covering receivers so tightly that quarterbacks didn't even try." Teams were known to throw to his teammate, cornerback Ken Riley's side instead of Parrish's. In 1974, Riley himself even said "They keep on throwin' over here, and I get my six or seven interceptions a year." Riley finished his career with the fourth most interceptions in NFL history, and was inducted into the Pro Football Hall of Fame in 2023.

== Personal life ==
After retiring in 1982, Parrish struggled with a drug addiction, but checked into a Tennessee rehab clinic in 1986 and managed to overcome it and turn his life around.

He later returned to his alma mater, Lincoln University of Missouri, and earned a bachelor's degree in physical education with a minor in psychology. Parrish eventually served as head coach of the Blue Tigers football team from 2004 to 2009.

In 2012, he was inducted into the Lincoln University Athletic Hall of Fame.

== Head coaching record ==
Year	Team	Overall	Conference	Standing	Bowl/playoffs
Lincoln Blue Tigers (NCAA Division II independent) (2005)
2005	Lincoln	2–7			
Lincoln Blue Tigers (Great Lakes Football Conference) (2006–2008)
2006	Lincoln	1–8	1–3	5th	
2007	Lincoln	2–8	0–5	6th	
2008	Lincoln	2–8	0–3	5th	
Lincoln:		7–31	1–11		
Total:		7–31			
