= Carl Brettschneider =

American football player (1931–2014)

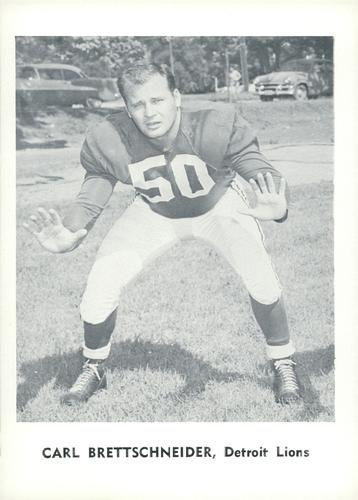
- Brettschneider in 1961

No. 57
- Position: Linebacker

Personal information
- Born: December 2, 1931; Carpentersville, Illinois, U.S.
- Died: November 26, 2014 (aged 82); Las Vegas, Nevada, U.S.
- Listed height: 6 ft 1 in (1.85 m)
- Listed weight: 223 lb (101 kg)

Career information
- College: Iowa State
- NFL draft: 1956: undrafted

Career history

Playing
- Chicago Cardinals (1956–1959); Detroit Lions (1960–1963)

Coaching
- Detroit Lions (1965–1966) Defensive line

Career NFL statistics
- Interceptions: 3
- Fumble recoveries: 8
- Sacks: 13.5
- Stats at Pro Football Reference

Carl Brettschneider (December 2, 1931 – November 26, 2014) was an All-Pro linebacker in the NFL. He played for the Chicago Cardinals and Detroit Lions.
