= Gale Bullman =

American football player and coach (1901–1977)

Biographical details
- Born: September 18, 1901; Sistersville, West Virginia, U.S.
- Died: June 24, 1977 (aged 75); Rolla, Missouri, U.S.

Playing career
- 1921–1924: West Virginia Wesleyan
- 1925: Columbus Tigers
- Position: End

Coaching career (HC unless noted)
- 1925: Buckhannon HS (WV)
- 1926–1936: Washington University (assistant)
- 1937–1963: Missouri Mines / Missouri–Rolla

Administrative career (AD unless noted)
- 1937–1967: Missouri Mines / Missouri–Rolla

Head coaching record
- Overall: 96–112–9 (college)

Accomplishments and honors

Championships
- 5 MIAA (1941, 1947, 1949–1950, 1956)

Delmar Gale Bullman (September 18, 1901 – June 24, 1977) was an American football player and coach. He played college football at West Virginia Wesleyan College and professionally in the National Football League (NFL) with the Columbus Tigers. Bullman served as the head football coach at the Missouri School of Mines and Metallurgy—now known as Missouri University of Science and Technology—from 1937 to 1963, compiling a record of 96–112–9. He was also athletic director there from 1937 to 1967.

Missouri S&T's sports-related multi-purpose building is named for Bullman, as is the university's most prestigious award for student athletes.

Bullman was born in Sistersville, West Virginia. During World War II, he served as a lieutenant in the United States Navy. Bullman died on June 24, 1977, in Rolla, Missouri.

== Head coaching record ==
=== College ===
Year	Team	Overall	Conference	Standing	Bowl/playoffs
Missouri Mines / Missouri–Rolla Miners (Missouri Intercollegiate Athletic Association) (1937–1963)
1937	Missouri Mines	3–4–1	2–2–1	3rd	
1938	Missouri Mines	4–4	3–2	2nd	
1939	Missouri Mines	5–4	3–2	3rd	
1940	Missouri Mines	3–3–2	2–2–1	3rd	
1941	Missouri Mines	4–3–2	3–1–1	T–1st	
1942	Missouri Mines	3–4	2–2	T–3rd	
1943	Missouri Mines	5–3			
1944	No team—World War II				
1945	Missouri Mines	0–5			
1946	Missouri Mines	4–3–2	3–1–1	2nd	
1947	Missouri Mines	4–3	4–1	1st	
1948	Missouri Mines	4–3–2	2–1–2	3rd	
1949	Missouri Mines	6–2	5–0	1st	
1950	Missouri Mines	7–2	4–1	1st	
1951	Missouri Mines	3–5	3–2	3rd	
1952	Missouri–Rolla	3–5	3–2	3rd	
1953	Missouri–Rolla	3–5	2–3	4th	
1954	Missouri–Rolla	3–5	3–2	3rd	
1955	Missouri–Rolla	4–5	2–3	T–3rd	
1956	Missouri–Rolla	6–3	4–1	T–1st	
1957	Missouri–Rolla	5–5	3–2	T–2nd	
1958	Missouri–Rolla	5–4	4–1	2nd	
1959	Missouri–Rolla	4–4	2–3	4th	
1960	Missouri–Rolla	0–9	0–5	6th	
1961	Missouri–Rolla	4–5	3–2	T–2nd	
1962	Missouri–Rolla	2–7	1–4	5th	
1963	Missouri–Rolla	2–7	2–3	T–3rd	
Missouri Mines / Missouri–Rolla:		96–112–9	65–48–6		
Total:		96–112–9			
National championship Conference title Conference division title or championship game berth
