= Carl Voltmer =

American football player and coach (1902–1995)

Biographical details
- Born: October 24, 1902; Sigourney, Iowa, U.S.
- Died: March 5, 1995 (aged 92); Stockton, California, U.S.

Playing career

Football
- 1926: Iowa

Wrestling
- 1925–1927: Iowa

Coaching career (HC unless noted)

Football
- 1928: St. Albans Academy (IL)
- 1932: Defiance
- 1935–1943: Central Missouri

Head coaching record
- Overall: 37–36–10 (college)

Carl David Voltmer (October 24, 1902 – March 5, 1995) was an American football player and coach. He served as the head football coach at Defiance College in Defiance, Ohio in 1932 and Central Missouri State College—now known as University of Central Missouri—from 1935 to 1943, compiling a career college football coaching record of 37–36–10. As a college athlete, Voltmer played football and wrestled at the University of Iowa.

== Head coaching record ==
=== College ===
Year	Team	Overall	Conference	Standing	Bowl/playoffs
Defiance Yellow Jackets (Independent) (1932)
1932	Defiance	3–5			
Defiance:		3–5			
Central Missouri State Mules (Missouri Intercollegiate Athletic Association) (1935–1943)
1935	Central Missouri State	4–3–1	2–2–1	T–3rd	
1936	Central Missouri State	6–2	4–1	2nd	
1937	Central Missouri State	7–1	4–1	2nd	
1938	Central Missouri State	2–5–1	1–3–1	5th	
1939	Central Missouri State	3–3–3	1–2–2	4th	
1940	Central Missouri State	5–3	2–3	5th	
1941	Central Missouri State	3–2–3	2–1–2	3rd	
1942	Central Missouri State	0–7	0–4	5th	
1943	Central Missouri State	4–4–2	NA	NA	
Central Missouri State:		34–31–10	16–17–6		
Total:		37–36–10			
