= Abe Stuber =

American football player and sport coach (1903–1989)

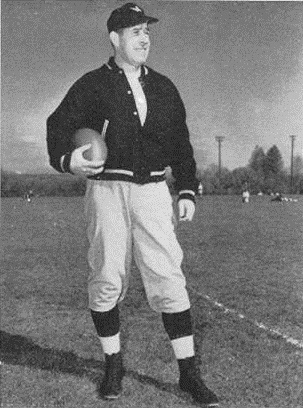
- Stuber from 1955 Washington yearbook

Biographical details
- Born: November 12, 1903
- Died: November 20, 1989 (aged 86); Cape Girardeau, Missouri, U.S.

Playing career

Football
- 1924–1926: Missouri
- Position: Quarterback

Coaching career (HC unless noted)

Football
- 1929–1931: Westminster (MO)
- 1932–1946: Southeast Missouri State
- 1947–1953: Iowa State
- 1954: Washington (backfield)
- 1955: Philadelphia Eagles (backfield)
- 1956: Green Bay Packers (assistant)
- 1958: Chicago Cardinals (assistant)

Basketball
- 1932–1935: Southeast Missouri State
- 1943–1946: Southeast Missouri State

Head coaching record
- Overall: 114–87–11 (football); 60–42 (basketball)

Accomplishments and honors

Championships
- Football; 1 MCAU (1931); 3 MIAA (1937, 1942, 1946)

Emmett R. "Abe" Stuber (November 12, 1903 – November 20, 1989) was an American football player and coach of football and basketball. He served as the head football coach at Westminster College in Fulton, Missouri, from 1929 to 1931, at Southeast Missouri State Teachers College—now known as Southeast Missouri State University—from 1932 to 1946, and at Iowa State University from 1947 to 1953, compiling a career college football coaching record of 114–87–11 He was also the head basketball coach at Southeast Missouri State from 1932 to 1935 and from 1943 to 1946, tallying a mark of 60–42. Stuber played college football as a quarterback at the University of Missouri. He worked as an assistant coach in the National Football League (NFL), with the Philadelphia Eagles in 1955, the Green Bay Packers in 1956, and the Chicago Cardinals in 1958, and later as the director of player personnel for the Cardinals, then located in St. Louis.

Stuber died on November 20, 1989, at this home in Cape Girardeau, Missouri.

== Head coaching record ==
=== Football ===
Year	Team	Overall	Conference	Standing	Bowl/playoffs
Westminster Blue Jays (Missouri College Athletic Union) (1929–1931)
1929	Westminster	6–2–1	5–1–1	2nd	
1930	Westminster	4–5	2–3	T–4th	
1931	Westminster	8–0–1	4–0–1	1st	
Westminster:		18–7–2	11–4–2		
Southeast Missouri State Indians (Missouri Intercollegiate Athletic Association) (1932–1946)
1932	Southeast Missouri State	2–6–1	0–4	5th	
1933	Southeast Missouri State	5–3–1	2–2	3rd	
1934	Southeast Missouri State	8–1	3–1	2nd	
1935	Southeast Missouri State	7–2	3–2	2nd	
1936	Southeast Missouri State	4–5	3–2	3rd	
1937	Southeast Missouri State	9–0	5–0	1st	
1938	Southeast Missouri State	3–5	1–4	6th	
1939	Southeast Missouri State	5–3–1	1–3–1	5th	
1940	Southeast Missouri State	4–5–1	1–3–1	5th	
1941	Southeast Missouri State	4–4–1	0–4–1	6th	
1942	Southeast Missouri State	6–2	3–1	T–1st	
1943	Southeast Missouri State	4–2			
1944	Southeast Missouri State	3–4			
1945	No team—World War II				
1946	Southeast Missouri State	8–0–1	5–0	1st	
Southeast Missouri State:		72–42–6			
Iowa State Cyclones (Big Six/Big Seven Conference) (1947–1953)
1947	Iowa State	3–6	1–4	5th	
1948	Iowa State	4–6	2–4	T–5th	
1949	Iowa State	5–3–1	3–3	T–3rd	
1950	Iowa State	3–6–1	2–3–1	5th	
1951	Iowa State	4–4–1	2–4	T–4th	
1952	Iowa State	3–6	1–5	6th	
1953	Iowa State	2–7	1–5	7th	
Iowa State:		24–38–3	12–28–1		
Total:		114–87–11			
National championship Conference title Conference division title or championship game berth
