= Great Lakes Football Conference =

- Conference: NCAA
- Founded: 2006
- Folded: 2011
- Commissioner: Bill Massoels
- Sports fielded: 1 (football); men's: 1
- Division: Division II
- No. of teams: 6 (charter), 7 (total)
- Headquarters: Rensselaer, Indiana
- Region: Central United States

The Great Lakes Football Conference (GLFC) was an American football-only conference that competed in NCAA Division II for six seasons (2006 through 2011). Bill Massoels, Athletic Director at St. Joseph's College, served as its commissioner, and the league was headquartered at the college in Rensselaer, Indiana. St. Joseph's was also the catalyst of a previous failed attempt to form a conference of the same name in the late 1990s.

== History ==
Public rumors of the GLFC's formation dated from January 2006. By that April, a schedule for the 2006 season had been drafted, including six founding members: Kentucky Wesleyan College, Missouri University of Science and Technology (Missouri S&T, then known as Missouri-Rolla), Lincoln University of Missouri, Central State University, Tiffin University, and St. Joseph's. Of the six schools, three (Kentucky Wesleyan, Missouri-Rolla, and St. Joseph's) were full members of the Great Lakes Valley Conference (GLVC), while Lincoln was a full member of the Heartland Conference. Central State and Tiffin were Division II independents.

The GLFC was intended as a football home for schools from conferences such as the GLVC and Heartland, which did not sponsor the sport. Tiffin left the conference after the 2007 season, to accept an offer of full membership from the Great Lakes Intercollegiate Athletic Conference (GLIAC). Lincoln left after the 2009 season, when it moved its full membership from the non-football Heartland Conference to the Mid-America Intercollegiate Athletics Association (MIAA). Central State likewise left after the 2009 season, to return to independent status in football. Independent Urbana University joined the GLFC in 2010, giving the league four members for its last two seasons. Kentucky Wesleyan, Missouri S&T, and St. Joseph's were the only members to participate in all six seasons of GLFC play.

No GLFC team ever qualified for the NCAA Division II Football Championship playoffs. Before leaving to join the GLIAC, Tiffin posted the best overall season records, 10-1 in 2006 (with a final #22 ranking in the AFCA Coaches Poll) and 9-2 in 2007.

Despite its small membership, the GLFC only played a full round-robin schedule in three of its six seasons (2007, 2010, and 2011). William Jewell College, a Division II football independent for the 2011 season, played all four GLFC members that year but was never a member of the conference.

In January 2010, the GLVC established a timeline to begin sponsoring football in the fall of 2012. The plan was announced shortly after William Jewell was admitted to the GLVC, giving it the requisite minimum of six football playing members. Thus the GLFC's last two campaigns were lame-duck seasons, with the demise of the league already a certainty. The transition to GLVC football came not just for Kentucky Wesleyan, Missouri S&T, and St. Joseph's, but also for Urbana, which the GLVC admitted in October 2010 as an associate member in the sport. With all four members of the 2011 GLFC joining the GLVC for 2012, the Great Lakes Football Conference was effectively (though only unofficially) absorbed by the Great Lakes Valley Conference. Two other former members of the GLFC also eventually played football in the GLVC: Central State as an associate member (in 2012 only), and Lincoln as both an associate member (2014 through 2018) and full member (effective 2024).

On October 29, 2011, Urbana clinched the last GLFC championship with a 42-7 victory over Missouri S&T. Including shared titles, St. Joseph's led the way with three (2006, 2009, 2010), while Tiffin (2006, 2007), Urbana (2010, 2011), and Missouri S&T (2008, 2009) each won two.

== Members ==
A total of seven schools (four private, three public) were members of the GLFC:

Institution	Location	Founded	Affiliation	Nickname	Joined	Left
Central State University	Wilberforce, Ohio	1887	public	Marauders	2006	2010
Kentucky Wesleyan College	Owensboro, Kentucky	1858	United Methodist	Panthers	2006	2012
Lincoln University of Missouri	Jefferson City, Missouri	1866	public	Blue Tigers	2006	2010
Missouri University of Science and Technology	Rolla, Missouri	1870	public	Miners	2006	2012
St. Joseph's College	Rensselaer, Indiana	1889	Roman Catholic	Pumas	2006	2012
Tiffin University	Tiffin, Ohio	1888	nonsectarian	Dragons	2006	2008
Urbana University	Urbana, Ohio	1850	Swedenborgian	Blue Knights	2010	2012

== Annual standings ==
2006 Great Lakes Football Conference standings
	Conf.			Overall
Team	W		L	W		L
No. 22 Tiffin +	4	–	1	10	–	1
Saint Joseph's (IN) +	4	–	1	8	–	3
Central State (OH) #	2	–	1	2	–	5
Missouri–Rolla	2	–	2	6	–	5
Lincoln (MO)	1	–	3	1	–	8
Kentucky Wesleyan	0	–	5	0	–	11
+ – Conference co-champions; # – Provisional NCAA Division II member; Rankings from AFCA poll

2009 Great Lakes Football Conference standings
	Conf.			Overall
Team	W		L	W		L
Saint Joseph's (IN) $	4	–	0	5	–	6
Missouri S&T	2	–	1	4	–	7
Kentucky Wesleyan	2	–	2	2	–	9
Central State (OH)	1	–	2	1	–	10
Lincoln (MO)	0	–	4	0	–	11
$ – Conference champion

2007 Great Lakes Football Conference standings
	Conf.			Overall
Team	W		L	W		L
Tiffin $	5	–	0	9	–	2
Central State (OH) #	3	–	2	5	–	5
Missouri–Rolla	3	–	2	4	–	7
Saint Joseph's (IN)	3	–	2	4	–	7
Kentucky Wesleyan	1	–	4	3	–	8
Lincoln (MO)	0	–	5	2	–	8
$ – Conference champion; # – Provisional NCAA Division II member

2010 Great Lakes Football Conference standings
	Conf.			Overall
Team	W		L	W		L
Saint Joseph's (IN) +	2	–	1	5	–	5
Urbana +	2	–	1	5	–	6
Missouri S&T +	2	–	1	3	–	8
Kentucky Wesleyan	0	–	3	5	–	5
+ – Conference co-champions

2008 Great Lakes Football Conference standings
	Conf.			Overall
Team	W		L	W		L
Missouri S&T $	3	–	1	7	–	4
Kentucky Wesleyan	2	–	1	4	–	6
Central State (OH)	2	–	1	2	–	7
Saint Joseph's (IN)	1	–	2	5	–	5
Lincoln (MO)	0	–	3	2	–	8
$ – Conference champion

2011 Great Lakes Football Conference standings
	Conf.			Overall
Team	W		L	W		L
Urbana $	3	–	0	8	–	3
Missouri S&T	2	–	1	6	–	5
Saint Joseph's (IN)	1	–	2	2	–	8
Kentucky Wesleyan	0	–	3	1	–	10
$ – Conference champion
