= Allgood–Bailey Stadium =

Stadium in Rolla, Missouri

Allgood-Bailey Stadium
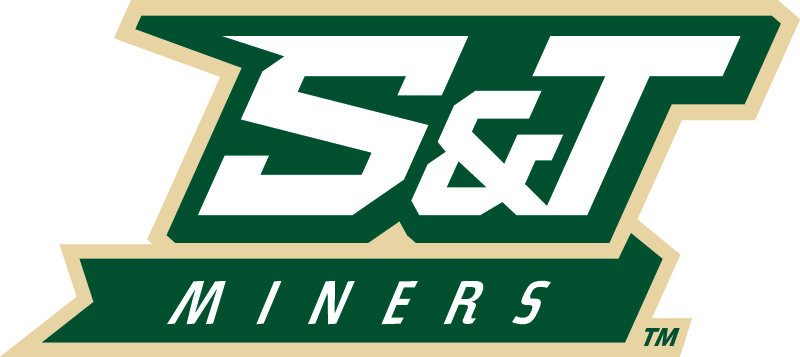

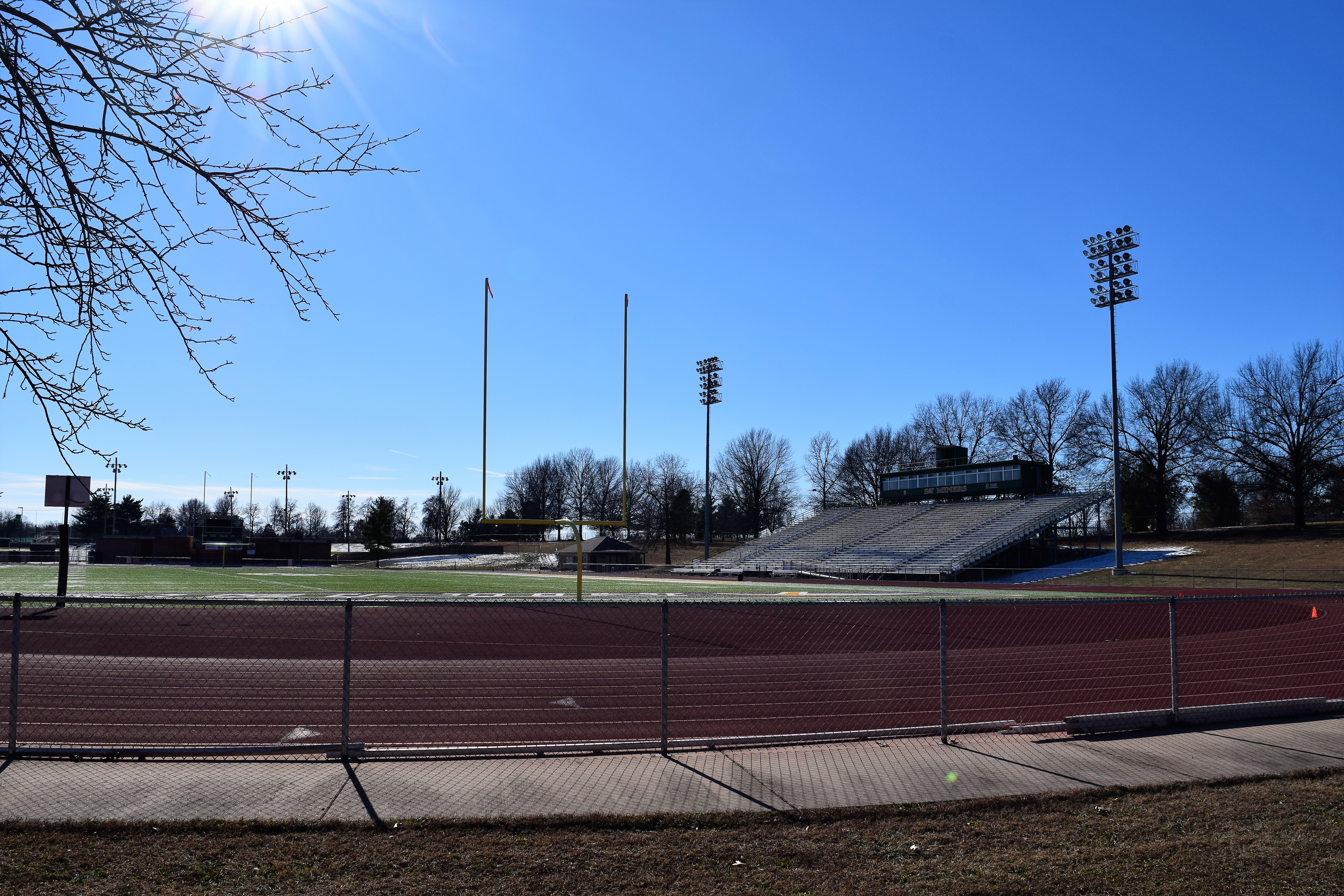
- The stadium in 2017
- Interactive map of Allgood-Bailey Stadium
- Full name: Dewey Allgood and Keith Bailey Stadium
- Former names: Jackling Field
- Address: Rolla, MO; United States
- Coordinates: 37.950198°N 91.780909°W
- Owner: Missouri S&T
- Operator: Missouri S&T Athletics
- Capacity: 8,000
- Type: Stadium
- Surface: FieldTurf
- Current use: American football

Construction
- Opened: 1967; 59 years ago

Tenants
- Missouri S&T Miners (NCAA) football(1967–present)

Website
- minerathletics.com/stadium

Allgood–Bailey Stadium is an outdoor stadium on the campus of the Missouri University of Science and Technology in Rolla, Missouri. The stadium has a capacity of 8,000 and hosts Missouri S&T Miners football games and track and field competitions.

It opened in 1967 and until 2000 was known as "Jackling Field", commemorating the notable Missouri alumnus Daniel C. Jackling. It was then renamed for the football and basketball coach Dewey Allgood and a benefactor, Keith Bailey.
