= Missouri S&T Miners football =

College football team

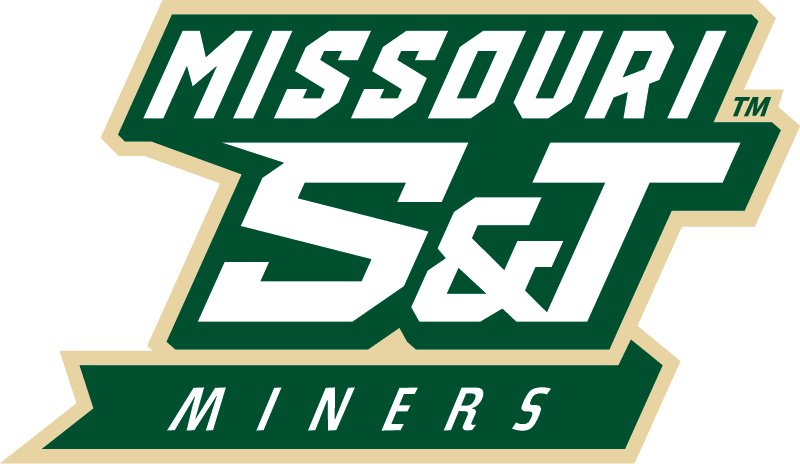
- First season: 1893; 133 years ago
- Athletic director: Melissa Ringhausen
- Head coach: Andy Ball; 5th season, 21–33 (.389)
- Location: Rolla, Missouri
- Stadium: Allgood–Bailey Stadium (capacity: 8,000)
- NCAA division: Division II
- Conference: Great Lakes Valley Conference
- Colors: Green and gold
- All-time record: 429–564–35 (.434)
- Bowl record: 2–0–0 (1.000)

National championships
- Claimed: 0

Conference championships
- 8
- Website: minerathletics.com/football

The Missouri S&T Miners football program represents Missouri University of Science and Technology in college football and competes in the Division II level of the National Collegiate Athletic Association (NCAA). In 2012, Missouri S&T became a member of the Great Lakes Valley Conference and has remained in the league since. Prior to this, Missouri S&T was in the Great Lakes Football Conference, and the Mid-America Intercollegiate Athletics Association from 1935 to 2005. S&T's home games are played at Allgood–Bailey Stadium in Rolla, Missouri. The program maintains an all-time record of 435–569–35 (.436).

== Conference affiliations ==
- 1935–2005: Missouri Intercollegiate Athletic Association / Mid-America Intercollegiate Athletics Association
- 2007–2011: Great Lakes Football Conference
- 2012–present: Great Lakes Valley Conference

== Stadium ==
The Miners have played their home games at Allgood–Bailey Stadium since 1967. The current capacity of the stadium is at 8,000.

== Championships ==
=== Conference championship seasons ===
#	Year	Conference	Coach	Overall	Conf.
1	1941^{1}	MIAA	Gale Bullman	4–3–2	3–1–1
2	1947	MIAA	Gale Bullman	4–3	4–1
3	1949	MIAA	Gale Bullman	6–2	5–0
4	1950	MIAA	Gale Bullman	7–2	4–1
5	1956^{1}	MIAA	Gale Bullman	6–2	4–1
6	1977^{1}	MIAA	Charlie Finley	7–3–1	4–1–1
7	1980	MIAA	Charlie Finley	10–0	6–0
8	1983^{1}	MIAA	Charlie Finley	8–2	4–1
Total Conference Championships: 8
^{1} Denotes co-champions

== Postseason appearances ==
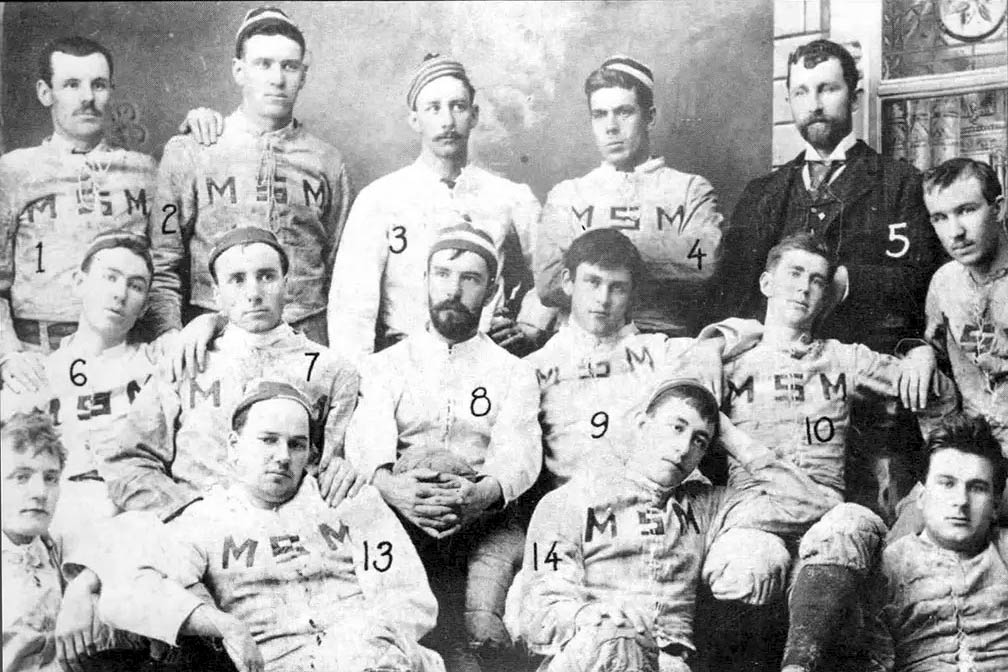
Early Miners football team c. 1893

#	Season	Game	Result	Opponent	Stadium	Location
1	1950	Corn Bowl	7–6	Illinois State	Wesleyan Stadium	Bloomington, IL
2	2018	Mineral Water Bowl	51–16	Minnesota State–Moorhead	Tiger Stadium	Excelsior Springs, MO

== Notable players ==
=== Current NFL Players ===
Player	Position	1st Year	Draft Round	Teams
Tershawn Wharton	DT	2020	Undrafted	Kansas City Chiefs, Carolina Panthers

=== Former NFL Players ===
Player	Position	1st Year	Draft Round	Teams
Dick Thornton	QB	1933	N/A	Philadelphia Eagles

All-Americans:

- Ed Kromka: 1941
- Frank Winfield: 1969
- Merle Dillow: 1974
- Bill Grantham: 1980
- Eivind Listerud: 1993
- Cole Drussa: 2003, 2004
- Ashton Gronewold: 2005, 2006, 2007
- Joe Winters: 2006
- Brian Crider, 2009
- Eddie Rascon, 2012
- Chris Emesih, 2013
- Will Brown, 2014
- Deshawn Jones, 2017
- Bo Brooks: 2018
- Roderick Chapman: 2018
- Braxton Graham, 2018
- Tyler Swart, 2018
- Tershawn Wharton, 2018
- Ben Straatmann: 2021
- Breon Michel: 2021
- Cameron Clemons: 2021
- Graham Carter, 2025

CSC Academic All-Americans:

- Kim Colter: 1972
- Paul Janke: 1980
- Randy Hauser: 1982
- Bob Pressly: 1982
- Tom Reed: 1986
- James Pfeiffer: 1987, 1988
- Mark Diamond: 1991
- Don Huff: 1991, 1992
- Eivind Listerud: 1993
- Brian Gilmore: 1994, 1995, 1996
- Curt Kimmel: 2001, 2002
- Cole Drussa: 2004
- Phil Shin: 2005
- Chad Shockley: 2010
- Brian Peterson: 2012
- Bret Curtis: 2016
- Bo Brooks 2017, 2018
- Landon Compton: 2017
- Deshawn Jones: 2017, 2018, 2019
- Payton McAlister: 2020
- Kyle Urich: 2020, 2021
- Zach Glaess: 2021
- Bentley Hart: 2025

== Records ==
- Missouri S&T football records since 1935 are listed below.
- Note: The 2020 season was played in the spring of 2021.

Year	Record	Conference
1935	1–7	0–5
1936	1–4–2	0–3–2
1937	3–4–1	2–2–1
1938	4–4	3–2
1939	5–4	3–2
1940	3–3–2	2–2–1
1941	4–3–2	3–1–1
1942	3–4	N/A
1943	5–3	N/A
1944	N/A	N/A
1945	0–5	N/A
1946	4–3–2	3–1–1
1947	4–3	4–1
1948	4–3–2	2–1–2
1949	6–2	5–0
1950	7–2	4–1
1951	3–5	3–2
1952	3–5	3–2
1953	3–5	2–3
1954	3–5	3–2
1955	4–5	2–3
1956	6–3	4–1
1957	5–5	3–2

Year	Record	Conference
1958	5–4	4–1
1959	4–4	2–3
1960	0–9	0–5
1961	4–5	3–2
1962	2–7	1–4
1963	2–7	2–3
1964	1–8	1–4
1965	2–7	0–5
1966	3–7	1–4
1967	2–7	0–5
1968	4–5	2–3
1969	7–2	3–2
1970	6–3–1	2–3–1
1971	4–6–1	2–3–1
1972	2–9	1–5
1973	3–6–2	2–3–1
1974	5–5–1	3–2–1
1975	1–8–2	1–5
1976	4–6–1	2–4
1977	7–3–1	4–1–1
1978	8–3	4–2
1979	7–3–1	3–3
1980	10–0	6–0

Year	Record	Conference
1981	6–3–1	3–1–1
1982	8–3	3–2
1983	8–2	4–1
1984	6–4	2–3
1985	7–3	4–1
1986	5–6	2–3
1987	5–5	2–3
1988	2–8	2–4
1989	1–9	1–9
1990	0–10	0–9
1991	4–6–1	3–5–1
1992	2–9	1–8
1993	3–7	2–7
1994	5–5–1	4–4–1
1995	1–9	1–8
1996	3–8	1–8
1997	3–8	2–7
1998	0–11	0–9
1999	0–11	0–9
2000	2–9	0–9
2001	2–9	0–9
2002	0–11	0–9
2003	0–11	0–9

Year	Record	Conference
2004	3–8	2–7
2005	7–4	N/A
2006	6–5	2–2
2007	3–8	2–3
2008	7–4	3–1
2009	4–7	N/A
2010	3–8	2–2
2011	6–5	1–0
2012	10–1	7–1
2013	6–5	5–2
2014	4–7	3–5
2015	5–5	5–3
2016	5–6	4–4
2017	7–4	5–2
2018	10–2	6–1
2019	7–4	4–3
2020	2–1	2–1
2021	6–5	4–3
2022	3–7	2–4
2023	4–7	4–3
2024	4–7	3–5
2025	6–5	4–4
