= 1953 Orange Bowl =

American college football game

- 19th Orange Bowl
- Burdine Stadium in Miami, Florida, hosted the Orange Bowl.
Syracuse Orangemen	Alabama Crimson Tide
(7–2)	(9–2)
Independent	SEC
6	61
Head coach: Ben Schwartzwalder	Head coach: Harold Drew
AP / Coaches; 14 / NR	AP / Coaches; 9 / 9
	1	2	3	4	Total
Syracuse	6	0	0	0	6
Alabama	7	14	20	20	61
- Date: January 1, 1953
- Season: 1952
- Stadium: Burdine Stadium
- Location: Miami, Florida
- Favorite: Alabama by 13
- Referee: William Halloran (EAIFO; split crew: EAIFO, SEC)
- Attendance: 66,280

United States TV coverage
- Network: CBS
- Announcers: Red Barber

The 1953 Orange Bowl, part of the 1952 bowl game season, took place on January 1, 1953, at the Orange Bowl in Miami, Florida. The competing teams were the Alabama Crimson Tide, representing the Southeastern Conference (SEC) and the Syracuse Orangemen, competing as a football independent. Alabama won the game by a record margin of 61–6. The 55-point margin of victory remained the largest for a bowl game until the 2008 GMAC Bowl, and still stands as the largest margin of victory for an Alabama football team in a bowl game.

== Teams ==
=== Alabama ===
The 1952 Alabama squad posted their best overall record the 1950s, finishing 9–2 leading into the postseason. However, losses to Tennessee and Georgia Tech cost the Tide an SEC title. The day after defeating Maryland 27–7, Alabama accepted a bid to play in the Orange Bowl on New Years Day. The appearance marked the second for Alabama in the Orange Bowl, as they defeated Boston College 37–21 in the 1943 game.

=== Syracuse ===
The 1952 Syracuse squad finished the regular season with a record of 7–2 and as winners of the Lambert Trophy for the first time in school history. The Orangemen accepted a bid to play in the Orange Bowl after Navy declined the initial bid.

== Game summary ==
Alabama opened the scoring on the afternoon with a 27-yard touchdown pass from Clell Hobson to Bobby Luna to take a 7–0 lead. Syracuse responded on the following possession with their lone points of the game on a 15-yard, Joe Szombathy touchdown run. After the extra point failed, the score was 7–6. The Orangemen did not score again while the Crimson Tide scored 54 unanswered points. Alabama extended their lead to 21–6 at the half with two touchdowns on a one-yard Bobby Marlow run and a 50-yard Thomas Tharp reception from Hobson. The scoring continued in the third quarter with three more touchdowns on a 38-yard Bobby Luna run and runs of one and 30-yards by Tommy Lewis. Leading 41–6, Alabama scored another three touchdowns in the fourth quarter on a 21-yard Joe Cummings reception from Bart Starr, an 80-yard Hootie Ingram punt return and a 60-yard Marvin Hill interception return.

The final score of 61–6 set an NCAA record for largest margin of victory in a bowl game, surpassing the previous record of 49 points set by Michigan in both the 1902 and 1948 Rose Bowl Games. The 55-point margin of victory stood as the all-time record for a bowl game through the 2008 GMAC Bowl where Tulsa defeated Bowling Green 63–7 for a 56-point margin of victory. The 55-points still stands as the largest margin of victory for an Alabama football team in a bowl game.

Scoring summary

Quarter	Time	Drive			Team	Scoring information	Score	
Quarter	Time	Plays	Yards	TOP	Team	Scoring information	Syracuse	Alabama
1	8:13				Alabama	Bobby Luna 27-yard touchdown reception from Clell Hobson, Bobby Luna kick good	0	7
1	2:45				Syracuse	Joe Szombathy 15-yard touchdown run, kick failed	6	7
2	13:11				Alabama	Bobby Marlow 1-yard touchdown run, Bobby Luna kick good	6	14
2	4:40				Alabama	Thomas Tharp 50-yard touchdown reception from Clell Hobson, Bobby Luna kick good	6	21
3					Alabama	Bobby Luna 38-yard touchdown run, Bobby Luna kick good	6	28
3					Alabama	Tommy Lewis 1-yard touchdown run, Bobby Luna kick good	6	35
3					Alabama	Tommy Lewis 30-yard touchdown run, Bobby Luna kick failed	6	41
4	14:50				Alabama	Joe Cummings 21-yard touchdown reception from Bart Starr, Bobby Luna kick good	6	48
4					Alabama	80-yard punt return by Hootie Ingram, Bobby Luna kick failed	6	54
4					Alabama	Interception returned 60 yards for touchdown by Marvin Hill, Bobby Luna kick good	6	61
"TOP" = time of possession. For other American football terms, see Glossary of American football.							6	61
