= 1952 Alabama Crimson Tide football team =

American college football season

1952 Alabama Crimson Tide football

Orange Bowl champion

Orange Bowl, W 61–6 vs. Syracuse
- Conference: Southeastern Conference

Ranking
- Coaches: No. 9
- AP: No. 9
- Record: 10–2 (4–2 SEC)
- Head coach: Harold Drew (6th season)
- Captain: Bobby Wilson
- Home stadium: Denny Stadium; Legion Field; Ladd Stadium; Cramton Bowl

1952 Southeastern Conference football standings
	Conf.					Overall
Team	W		L		T	W		L		T
No. 2 Georgia Tech $	7	–	0	–	0	12	–	0	–	0
No. 8 Tennessee	5	–	0	–	1	8	–	2	–	1
No. 7 Ole Miss	4	–	0	–	2	8	–	1	–	2
No. 9 Alabama	4	–	2	–	0	10	–	2	–	0
Georgia	4	–	3	–	0	7	–	4	–	0
No. 15 Florida	3	–	3	–	0	8	–	3	–	0
Mississippi State	3	–	4	–	0	5	–	4	–	0
Tulane	3	–	5	–	0	5	–	5	–	0
No. 20 Kentucky	1	–	3	–	2	5	–	4	–	2
LSU	2	–	5	–	0	3	–	7	–	0
Vanderbilt	1	–	4	–	1	3	–	5	–	2
Auburn	0	–	7	–	0	2	–	8	–	0
$ – Conference champion; Rankings from AP Poll

The 1952 Alabama Crimson Tide football team (variously "Alabama", "UA" or "Bama") represented the University of Alabama in the 1952 college football season. It was the Crimson Tide's 58th overall and 19th season as a member of the Southeastern Conference (SEC). The team was led by head coach Harold Drew, in his sixth year, and played their home games at Denny Stadium in Tuscaloosa, Legion Field in Birmingham, Ladd Stadium in Mobile and at the Cramton Bowl in Montgomery, Alabama. They finished with a record of ten wins and two losses (10–2 overall, 4–2 in the SEC) and with a victory over Syracuse in the Orange Bowl.

After a 5–6 campaign for the 1951 season, Alabama bounced back in 1952 to have its best season of the decade and finished 10–2. However, losses to Tennessee, for the fifth consecutive year without a victory, and Georgia Tech cost Alabama the SEC title. The Crimson Tide ended the season in its first bowl game in five years, against Syracuse in the Orange Bowl. The 61–6 Alabama victory set a school record for most points scored in a bowl game and an Orange Bowl record for points scored until the 2012 Orange Bowl. The 55-point margin of victory stood as the all-time record for margin of victory in a bowl game through the 2008 GMAC Bowl.

Freshman quarterback Bart Starr, playing with the varsity, appeared in seven games as the backup to Clell Hobson. Starr went on to have a legendary Hall of Fame career as quarterback of the Green Bay Packers.

== Schedule ==
Date	Opponent	Rank	Site	TV	Result	Attendance
September 19	Mississippi Southern*		Cramton Bowl; Montgomery, AL		W 20–6	12,000
September 27	at LSU		Tiger Stadium; Baton Rouge, LA (rivalry)		W 21–20	34,000
October 3	at Miami (FL)*		Burdine Stadium; Miami, FL		W 21–7	53,916
October 11	VPI*	No. 18	Denny Stadium; Tuscaloosa, AL		W 33–0	16,000
October 18	at Tennessee	No. 18	Shields–Watkins Field; Knoxville, TN (Third Saturday in October)		L 0–20	55,000
October 25	Mississippi State^{†}		Denny Stadium; Tuscaloosa, AL (rivalry)		W 42–19	25,000
November 1	Georgia	No. 19	Legion Field; Birmingham, AL (rivalry)		W 34–19	34,000
November 8	Chattanooga*	No. 16	Denny Stadium; Tuscaloosa, AL		W 42–28	18,000
November 15	at No. 2 Georgia Tech	No. 12	Grant Field; Atlanta, GA (rivalry)	NBC	L 3–7	40,000
November 22	No. 8 Maryland*	No. 14	Ladd Stadium; Mobile, AL		W 27–7	33,178
November 29	vs. Auburn	No. 8	Legion Field; Birmingham, AL (Iron Bowl)		W 21–0	40,000
January 1, 1953	vs. No. 14 Syracuse*	No. 9	Burdine Stadium; Miami, FL (Orange Bowl)	CBS	W 61–6	66,280
*Non-conference game; ^{†}Homecoming; Rankings from AP Poll released prior to the game

== Game summaries ==
=== Mississippi Southern ===
Team	1	2	3	4	Total
Mississippi Southern	0	6	0	0	6
• Alabama	7	6	7	0	20

- Date: September 19
- Location: Cramton Bowl
  Montgomery, AL
- Game attendance: 12,000

To open the 1952 season, Alabama defeated the Mississippi Southern Golden Eagles 20–6 at the Cramton Bowl in a game where the Crimson Tide set a conference with their 12 fumbles. Clell Hobson scored the first touchdown for Alabama on his eight-yard run in the first quarter for a 7–0 lead. Southern responded in the second quarter with their lone points on a 13-yard Laurin Pepper touchdown run before the Crimson Tide made the halftime score 13–6 after a four-yard Bobby Luna run. Alabama then scored the final touchdown of the game in the third on a four-yard Bobby Marlow run.

=== LSU ===
Team	1	2	3	4	Total
LSU	0	7	6	7	20
• Alabama	0	14	0	7	21

- Date: September 27
- Location: Tiger Stadium
  Baton Rouge, LA
- Game attendance: 34,000

To open conference play for the 1952 season, Alabama defeated LSU 21–20 at Tiger Stadium in Baton Rouge. After the Tigers took a 7–0 lead on a 16-yard Al Doggett touchdown pass to Ron Emberg, Bobby Luna scored on a pair of two-yard touchdown runs and gave the Crimson Tide a 14–7 halftime lead. LSU responded to take a 20–14 lead late in the fourth quarter after Doggett scored on a 38-yard run in the third and on a 20-yard Norman Stevens run early in the fourth quarter. Alabama then scored the game-winning touchdown on a 95-yard Bob Conway kickoff return for the 21–20 win.

=== Miami (FL) ===
Team	1	2	3	4	Total
• Alabama	0	7	7	7	21
Miami	0	7	0	0	7

- Date: October 3
- Location: Burdine Stadium
  Miami, FL
- Game attendance: 53,916

On a Friday evening in Miami, Alabama defeated the Miami Hurricanes 21–7 at Burdine Stadium. After a scoreless first quarter, Miami scored the first touchdown of the game on a one-yard Don James run and Alabama followed with a one-yard Bobby Marlow touchdown run to tie the game at halftime 7–7. In the second half, the Crimson Tide defense shut out the Hurricanes and the offense added a pair of touchdowns to win 21–7. The second-half touchdowns were scored on a second one-yard Marlow run in the third quarter and on a four-yard Thomas Tharp run in the fourth quarter.

=== VPI ===
Team	1	2	3	4	Total
VPI	0	0	0	0	0
• #18 Alabama	14	13	0	6	33

- Date: October 11
- Location: Denny Stadium
  Tuscaloosa, AL
- Game attendance: 16,000

Against the Fighting Gobblers of VPI (now known as the Virginia Tech Hokies), Alabama won 33–0 at Denny Field. Four first half touchdowns gave the Crimson Tide a 27–0 halftime lead that proved insurmountable for the Gobblers. Touchdown were scored in the first on a 10-yard Bobby Luna run and a three-yard Tommy Lewis run, and in the second on Thomas Tharp runs of 85 and 20-yards. With the reserves in place of the second half, the final touchdown of the game came in the fourth quarter when Bobby Duke threw a 14-yard strike to William Oliver and made the final score 33–0.

=== Tennessee ===
Third Saturday in October

Team	1	2	3	4	Total
#18 Alabama	0	0	0	0	0
• Tennessee	6	0	0	14	20

- Date: October 18
- Location: Shields-Watkins Field
  Knoxville, TN
- Game attendance: 55,000

Against their long-time rival, the Tennessee Volunteers, Alabama was shut out 20–0 at Shields-Watkins Field for their first loss of the season. The first Tennessee points were set up early in the first after Mack Franklin blocked a Bobby Wilson punt. Andy Kozar then gave the Vols a 6–0 lead with his two-yard run on the drive that ensued. Tennessee did not score again until the fourth quarter when Pat Shires threw a 10-yard touchdown pass to Frank Alexander and Jimmy Wade scored on a four-yard run for the 20–0 victory.

=== Mississippi State ===
Team	1	2	3	4	Total
Mississippi State	7	0	12	0	19
• Alabama	7	14	7	14	42

- Date: October 25
- Location: Denny Stadium
  Tuscaloosa, AL
- Game attendance: 25,000

On homecoming in Tuscaloosa, the Crimson Tide scored touchdowns in all four quarters and defeated the Mississippi State Maroons 42–19 at Denny Stadium. Jackie Parker scored the first touchdown of the game for the Maroons with his one-yard touchdown run and Bobby Marlow responded with a nine-yard run to tie the game 7–7 at the end of the first quarter. In the second quarter, Marlow scored touchdowns on a 56-yard run and on a 14-yard reception from Clell Hobson and gave Alabama a 21–7 halftime lead. In between Parker touchdown runs of two and six-yards for State, Thomas Tharp scored for the Tide on a 23-yard run and Alabama led 28–19 at the end of the third. The Crimson Tide then closed the game with a pair of fourth-quarter touchdowns on a 45-yard Hobson pass to Tharp and a four-yard Bob Conway run for the 42–19 win.

=== Georgia ===
Team	1	2	3	4	Total
Georgia	6	6	0	7	19
• #19 Alabama	7	7	7	13	34

- Date: November 1
- Location: Legion Field
  Birmingham, AL
- Game attendance: 34,000

At Legion Field, Alabama defeated the Georgia Bulldogs 34–19, and with the victory exceeded their win total from the previous season. After Bobby Marlow gave Alabama a 7–0 first quarter lead, the Bulldogs responded with a 12-yard Zeke Bratkowski touchdown pass to Robert Dellinger in the first and on a one-yard Robert Clemens run for a 12–7 second quarter lead. Clell Hobson then scored on a four-yard run to give the Crimson Tide a 14–12 halftime lead. Alabama then scored on a pair of Thomas Tharp touchdown runs of 13 and 19-yards and a Bob Conway run of one-yard for a 34–12 lead late in the fourth quarter. A nine-yard James Harper run for Georgia late in the fourth provided for the final 34–19 winning margin for the Crimson Tide.

=== Chattanooga ===
Team	1	2	3	4	Total
Chattanooga	7	0	0	21	28
• #16 Alabama	0	21	21	0	42

- Date: November 8
- Location: Denny Stadium
  Tuscaloosa, AL
- Game attendance: 18,000

After going down 7–0, Alabama responded with 42 consecutive points and defeated the Chattanooga Moccasins 42–28 at Denny Stadium. Hal Ledyard scored for the Mocs on a three-yard run in the first quarter to give Chattanooga their only lead at 7–0. Alabama responded with touchdown runs of seven-yards by Bobby Marlow and 56 and six-yards by Thomas Tharp in the second for a 21–7 halftime lead. The Crimson Tide then scored another three touchdowns in the third quarter on a 60-yard Hootie Ingram interception return, a one-yard Bob Conway run and a two-yard Bobby Luna run for a 42–7 lead at the end of the third quarter. With the game in hand, the Alabama reserves did surrender three fourth-quarter touchdowns to the Mocs in a span of just over four minutes to make the final score 42–28. Chattanooga touchdowns in the quarter were scored on a 15-yard Ledyard pass to Fremo Ross, a 64-yard Ledyard pass to Jack Stanford and on a one-yard Buck Stamps run.

=== Georgia Tech ===
Team	1	2	3	4	Total
#12 Alabama	3	0	0	0	3
• #2 Georgia Tech	0	7	0	0	7

- Date: November 15
- Location: Grant Field
  Atlanta, GA
- Game attendance: 40,000
- Television network: ABC

In what was the ABC televised game of the week, Alabama lost to the Georgia Tech Yellow Jackets 7–3 at Grant Field in Atlanta. After a 25-yard Bobby Luna field goal gave the Crimson Tide a 3–0 first quarter lead, a nine-yard Dick Pretz touchdown run in the second quarter proved to be the game-winner for Tech.

=== Maryland ===
Team	1	2	3	4	Total
#8 Maryland	0	0	7	0	7
• #14 Alabama	6	7	7	7	27

- Date: November 22
- Location: Ladd Stadium
  Mobile, AL
- Game attendance: 33,178

In the first all-time meeting between the schools, Alabama upset the Maryland Terrapins 27–7 at Ladd Stadium in Mobile. The Crimson Tide scored touchdowns in all four quarters. They were scored in the first half on an 11-yard Bobby Luna pass to Bart Starr in the first quarter and on a one-yard Tommy Lewis run in the second for a 13–0 halftime lead for Alabama. After a 25-yard Jack Scarbath touchdown pass to Lou Weidensaul early in the third cut the Crimson Tide lead to 13–7, Alabama scored two more touchdowns to put the game away. The first came in the third quarter on a one-yard Bobby Marlow run and the second on a 22-yard Hootie Ingram interception return late in the fourth to make the final score 27–7.

=== Auburn ===
Iron Bowl

Team	1	2	3	4	Total
Auburn	0	0	0	0	0
• #8 Alabama	14	7	0	0	21

- Date: November 29
- Location: Legion Field
  Birmingham, AL
- Game attendance: 40,000

For the fourth time in five years since the revival of the Auburn series, Alabama shutout the Tigers 21–0 at Legion Field. The Crimson Tide took a 14–0 lead in the first quarter on touchdown runs of 13 and eight-yards by Tommy Lewis. Bobby Luna then scored the final touchdown in the second quarter on a four-yard run for the 21–0 victory.

=== Syracuse ===
Orange Bowl

Team	1	2	3	4	Total
#14 Syracuse	6	0	0	0	6
• #9 Alabama	7	14	20	20	61

- Date: January 1, 1953
- Location: Burdine Stadium
  Miami, FL
- Game attendance: 66,280
- Television network: CBS

In what was the first bowl game that the Crimson Tide competed in since the 1948 Sugar Bowl, Alabama dominated the Syracuse Orangemen 61–6, and the 55-point margin of victory remained the largest for a bowl game until the 2008 GMAC Bowl. In the first quarter, Alabama scored on a 27-yard touchdown pass from Clell Hobson to Bobby Luna to take a 7–0 lead. Syracuse responded on the following possession with their lone touchdown of the game on a 15-yard Joe Szombathy touchdown run to make the score 7–6. From this point, the Orangemen did not score again and the Crimson Tide dominated with 54 unanswered points. Alabama extended their lead to 21–6 at halftime on a one-yard Bobby Marlow touchdown run and a 50-yard Thomas Tharp reception from Hobson. In the third quarter, the Crimson Tide scored three more touchdowns on a 38-yard Bobby Luna run and on Tommy Lewis runs of one and 30-yards. With a 41–6 lead at the end of the third, Alabama scored another three touchdowns in the fourth quarter on a 21-yard Joe Cummings reception from Bart Starr, an 80-yard Hootie Ingram punt return and a 60-yard Marvin Hill interception return.

== Personnel ==
=== Varsity letter winners ===
Player	Hometown	Position
Ralph Carrigan	Oak Park, Illinois	Center
Bob Conway	Fort Wayne, Indiana	Halfback
Ed Culpepper	Bradenton, Florida	Tackle
Joe Cummings	Muleshoe, Texas	End
Joe Curtis	Birmingham, Alabama	End
Tom Danner	Tuscaloosa, Alabama	Guard
Jim Davis	Hamilton, Alabama	Guard
Vincent Delaurentis	Hammonton, New Jersey	Center
Charles Eckerly	Oak Park, Illinois	Guard
Marvin Hill	Huntsville, Alabama	Quarterback
Clell Hobson	Tuscaloosa, Alabama	Quarterback
Travis Hunt	Albertville, Alabama	Tackle
Hootie Ingram	Tuscaloosa, Alabama	Back
Hyrle Ivy	Fort Wayne, Indiana	End
William Kilroy	Philadelphia, Pennsylvania	Fullback
Jerry Lambert	Alabama City, Alabama	End
Harry Lee	Birmingham, Alabama	Guard
Bo Collins	Yazoo City, Mississippi	Guard
Tommy Lewis	Greenville, Alabama	Fullback
Bobby Luna	Huntsville, Alabama	Halfback
Charles Malcolm	Birmingham, Alabama	Fullback
Van Marcus	Birmingham, Alabama	Tackle
Bobby Marlow	Troy, Alabama	Halfback
George Mason	Langdale, Alabama	Tackle
Fred Mims	Birmingham, Alabama	Guard
William Oliver	Panola, Alabama	Halfback
Edward Pharo	Birmingham, Alabama	Fullback
Jess Richardson	Philadelphia, Pennsylvania	Guard
Billy Shipp	Mobile, Alabama	Tackle
Jack Smalley	Tuscaloosa, Alabama	Tackle
John Snoderly	Montgomery, Alabama	Center
Bart Starr	Montgomery, Alabama	Quarterback
Thomas Tharp	Birmingham, Alabama	Halfback
Tommy Tillman	Haleyville, Alabama	End
Jerry Watford	Gadsden, Alabama	Guard
Bob Wilga	Webster, Massachusetts	Guard
Billy Williams	Lincoln, Alabama	Tackle
Virgil Willis	Tifton, Georgia	End
Bobby Wilson	Bay Minette, Alabama	Quarterback
Sid Youngelman	Newark, New Jersey	Tackle

=== Coaching staff ===
Name	Position	Seasons at Alabama	Alma mater
Harold Drew	Head coach	19	Bates (1916)
Lew Bostick	Assistant coach	9	Alabama (1939)
Tilden Campbell	Assistant coach	13	Alabama (1935)
Hank Crisp	Assistant coach	25	VPI (1920)
John Dee	Assistant coach	1	Notre Dame (1945)
Joe Kilgrow	Assistant coach	9	Alabama (1937)
Malcolm Laney	Assistant coach	9	Alabama (1932)
James Nisbet	Assistant coach	4	Alabama (1937)
