= Bobby Dodd =

American football coach, player, and athletic director (1908–1988)

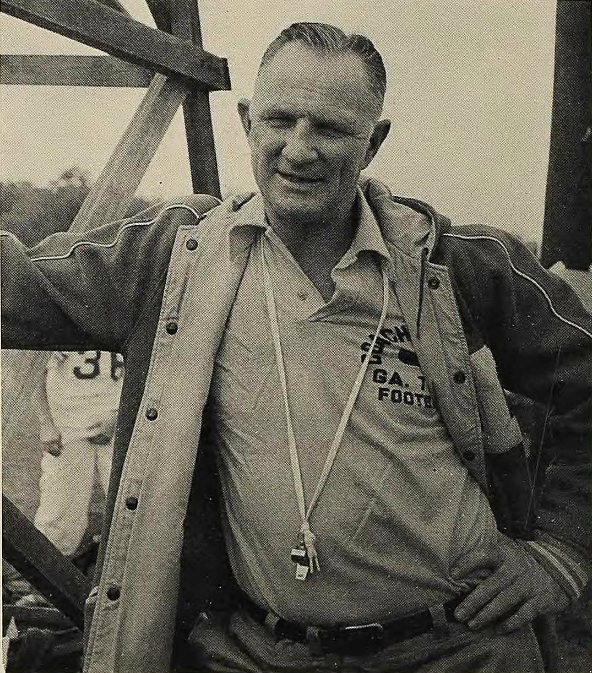
- Dodd from the 1963 Blueprint

Biographical details
- Born: November 11, 1908; Galax, Virginia, U.S.
- Died: June 21, 1988 (aged 79); Atlanta, Georgia, U.S.

Playing career

Football
- 1928–1930: Tennessee

Basketball
- 1928–1930: Tennessee

Baseball
- 1930: Tennessee
- Positions: Quarterback, tailback, punter (football)

Coaching career (HC unless noted)

Football
- 1931–1944: Georgia Tech (backfield)
- 1945–1966: Georgia Tech

Baseball
- 1932–1939: Georgia Tech

Administrative career (AD unless noted)
- 1950–1976: Georgia Tech

Head coaching record
- Overall: 165–64–8 (football); 43–64–2 (baseball)
- Bowls: 9–4

Accomplishments and honors

Championships
- Football; National (1952); SEC (1951–1952)

Awards
- Football; SEC Coach of the Year (1951–1952); American Football Writers Association Citation of Honor; First-team All-American (1930) General; Helms Hall of Fame; University of Tennessee Hall of Fame; Georgia Sports Hall of Fame
- College Football Hall of Fame; Inducted in 1993 (profile)

Robert Lee Dodd (November 11, 1908 – June 21, 1988) was an American college football player and coach, college baseball coach, and college athletics administrator. He served as the head football coach at Georgia Tech from 1945 to 1966, compiling a record of 165–64–8. His teams won consecutive Southeastern Conference (SEC) title in 1951 and 1952, and his 1952 Georgia Tech Yellow Jackets football team won the 1953 Sugar Bowl and was recognized as a national champion by a number of selectors though they finished second behind Michigan State in both major polls. Dodd was also Georgia Tech's head baseball coach from 1932 to 1939, tallying a mark of 43–64–2, and the school's athletic director from 1950 until 1976. All together, Dodd served Georgia Tech 57 years in various capacities.

Dodd starred as quarterback at the University of Tennessee, playing for teams coached by Robert Neyland from 1928 to 1930. He also lettered in baseball, basketball, and track at Tennessee. He was a member of Sigma Nu fraternity. Dodd began his coaching career at Georgia Tech, working as an assistant under William Alexander from 1931 until succeeding Alexander as head football coach in 1945. Dodd was inducted to the College Football Hall of Fame as a player in 1959 and a coach in 1993. He is one of four individuals to be so honored, along with Amos Alonzo Stagg, Bowden Wyatt, and Steve Spurrier.

== Early life ==
Robert Lee "Bobby" Dodd was born in 1908 in Galax, Virginia. He was named after Confederate General Robert E. Lee. Dodd was the youngest of Edwin and Susan Dodd's four children. In the fall of 1921, the Dodd family relocated to Kingsport, Tennessee. When Dodd was twelve and weighed only 100 pounds, he made the seventh-grade team of Kingsport's first organized football program. During the next three seasons, the Kingsport Indians were very successful, gaining two state titles. They were helped by Dodd, who moved from end to quarterback and kicker. Dodd is in the school's hall of fame.

However, the happiness of Bobby Dodd's early life came to a sad end in 1924 when his father committed suicide due to business failure and financial troubles. The family was forced to move, but was held together by the perseverance of Dodd's mother. In 1926, Bobby Dodd graduated and was admitted to the University of Tennessee with a football scholarship. Dodd wanted to play for Georgia Tech but was not offered a scholarship.

== Player at Tennessee ==
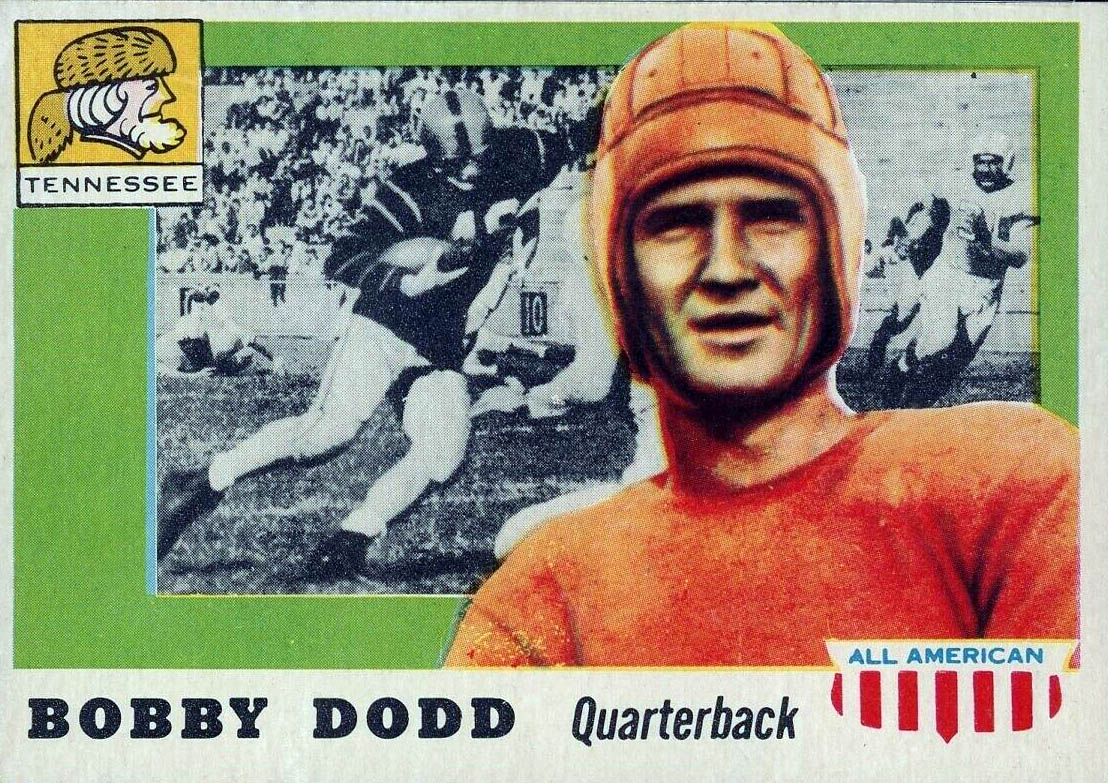
Dodd at the University of Tennessee depicted on a football card

Dodd played college football as a quarterback, tailback, and punter for the Tennessee Volunteers football team from 1928 to 1930, under head coach Robert Neyland. He also won varsity letters in baseball, basketball, and track during his time at Tennessee. (Note: Including a second-team All-Southern selection in basketball.) Dodd stood 6'1", weighed 170 pounds, and on the football team wore number 17. In the games that Dodd started at Tennessee, the Vols held a record of 27–1–2. He led Tennessee to back-to-back unbeaten seasons with identical 9–0–1 records his sophomore and junior years, leading the "Hack and Mack" backfield of Buddy Hackman and Gene McEver. Tennessee fans even developed a catch phrase for Dodd during his time there: "In Dodd we trust".

Dodd twice earned All-Southern honors, in his junior and senior years. "It is doubtful if any quarterback in the south can match Dodd on all-around ability. He is a fine passer, a punter of ability, and the greatest field general to ever grace southern turf since the days of the one and only Pooley Hubert", according to one newspaper article of this era. In 1959, Dodd was named to the University of Tennessee's Hall of Fame and to the College Football Hall of Fame as a player. He was elected in the same year as teammate Herman Hickman. He was nominated though not selected for an Associated Press All-Time Southeast 1920–1969 era team.

=== 1928 ===
During his sophomore year, his first year on the varsity, Dodd was the difference in the rivalry game against Alabama in Tuscaloosa, "Dodd threw a touchdown pass in that game to tie Alabama, 13–13. Then he punted out of bounds inside the Alabama 1-yard line and Tennessee got a safety on the next play to win, 15–13." To close the season, Dodd led the Vols to a victory in the mud over previously undefeated Florida, replacing the injured starter Roy Witt.

=== 1929–1930 ===
Dodd in 1930

The Vols went 33 games without a loss until an 18–6 setback against national champion Alabama in 1930, which ranks as the longest unbeaten streak in UT history. After the loss, Dodd and his teammates helped start a 28-game unbeaten streak that ranks as the second longest.

"The Dodger" again showed his versatility in a 13–0 win against Vanderbilt. Dodd finished with 14 punts with a 42-yard average, had nine carries for 39 yards, was 7-of-12 passing for 159 yards and two touchdowns and intercepted two passes. During that game, Dodd gained 212 all-purpose yards, collecting all but 14 of Tennessee's team total of 226.

Another instance in Dodd's career foreshadowed the creativity he would use in his coaching career.

"Against Florida in 1930 he got his teammates in a huddle and told them about a play he had used in high school. When the ball was snapped, it was placed on the ground unattended. The players ran in one direction. Then the center returned, picked up the ball, and waltzed to the winning touchdown." (Note: This play came to be popularly known as the "fumblerooski", after Nebraska famously used it in the 1984 Orange Bowl versus Miami.)

The Vols finished the 1930 season with a 9–1 record. Dodd was named to Grantland Rice's All-American team in 1930, making him the second ever granted that honor at Tennessee (following Gene McEver).

== Coach and athletic director at Georgia Tech ==
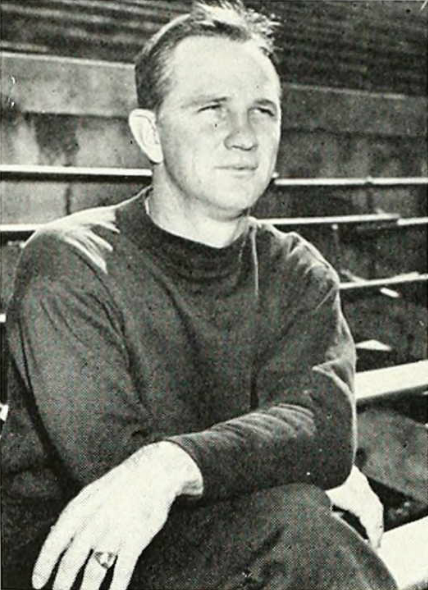
Dodd, c. 1943

After being recognized as 1928 national champions, the Georgia Tech Yellow Jackets football team struggled during the next two seasons. Georgia Tech football coach William Alexander began looking for a new assistant. During the 1930 football season, Alexander sent his line coach, Mack Tharpe, to scout future opponent North Carolina, playing Tennessee in Knoxville. Tharpe's car broke down and by the time he reached Knoxville, the game was over. Tharpe asked Tennessee head coach Bob Neyland for information, who suggested that he talk to Dodd. When Tharpe returned to Atlanta he told Alexander: "Dodd's analysis of Carolina is better than any scouting report that I could have made." Tech managed to tie the Tar Heels.

=== Assistant (1931–1944) ===
Alexander was also impressed by reports of Dodd's performance during games. On December 27, 1930, Dodd signed a contract to join Alexander's staff as backfield coach for the 1931 season. Dodd served as an assistant coach at Tech for 14 years, even though he received many offers for head coaching positions from other schools during that time frame. Dodd lionized Coach Alexander which was later reflected in his coaching style. "He taught me to treat athletes as men, not boys – to never use their failings as an alibi for a loss", Dodd said.

=== Head coach (1945–1966) ===
Dodd took over the Georgia Tech football program with the late president Blake Van Leer's support in 1945 following Coach Alexander's retirement as head football coach. Dodd's coaching philosophy revolved around player treatment and character development. He did not believe in intense physical practices but rather precise and well executed practices. Dodd's philosophy translated to winning; he set the record for career wins at Tech with 165, including a 31-game unbeaten streak from 1951–1953. He also managed to capture two Southeastern Conference (SEC) championships (1951 and 1952) and the 1952 national title, which concluded a perfect 12–0 season and Sugar Bowl conquest of Ole Miss. Under Dodd's leadership, Tech played in 13 major bowl games, winning 9, including six in a row. Bobby Dodd compiled a 165–64–8 record as head coach at Georgia Tech.

Dodd in 1961

Football was Dodd's passion, but at Tech he was just as obsessed with the notion that his players should get an education as he was with teaching them how to play football. Other coaches and sportswriters of his era were united in their puzzlement that anyone could coach with such a light hand and still win so many games. However, Coach Dodd knew that his "Books First" reputation caused parents to favor Georgia Tech over his competition.

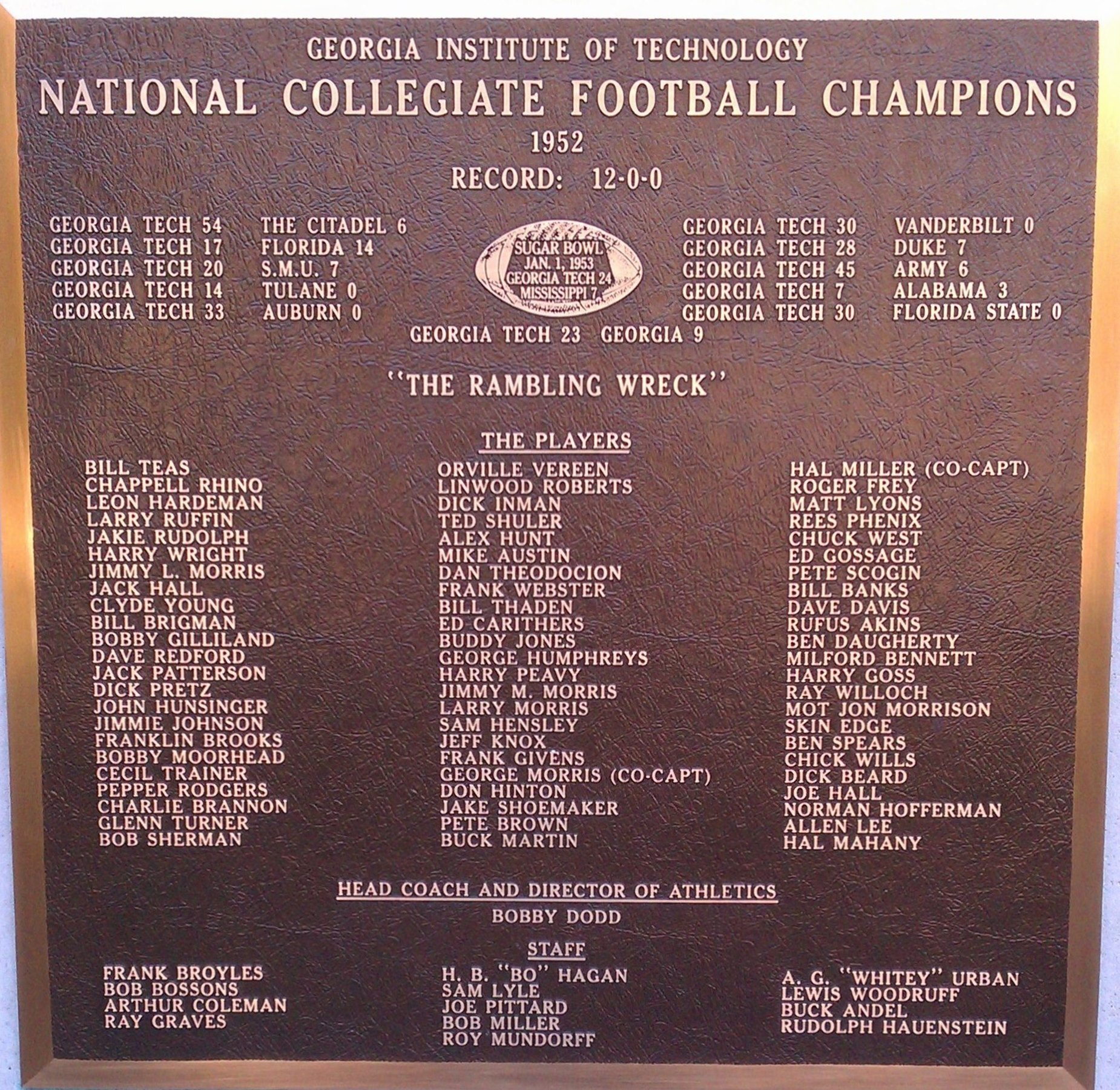
Plaque for 1952 GT Football National Championship

Georgia Tech football was Atlanta's one major sports franchise during this time frame. To hold a ticket to watch the Yellow Jackets play was highly valued and was difficult to obtain. During the games, Bobby Dodd sat in a folding chair at a card table on the side line, rarely standing or showing interest in the game. Dodd took his seat and left the pacing to his assistants. When a crisis arose, Dodd would decide which plays to be run and the designated players to run them. Dodd sometimes made unusual substitutions, as in the 1952 game against Georgia, when Georgia Tech seemed about to be upset. Dodd sent in a small halfback who had been frequently injured during his career, who then broke to the right faking a run, stopped, threw a pass for a touchdown and returned to the bench. What Dodd brought to Grant Field was a kind of unbruising football other coaches couldn't understand: runty halfbacks; lightweight linemen; rarely a classic quarterback. Once free substitution became possible, no one made more use of it than Dodd.

=== Rivalries ===
==== Alabama ====
Georgia Tech had an intense rivalry with the University of Alabama which ended during Bobby Dodd's tenure as head football coach. Until that time, the matchup between the Crimson Tide and the Yellow Jackets was a fall football classic. The two teams have met on the gridiron a total of 52 times with Georgia Tech coming away victorious in 21 of those matchups, with 3 ties. Bobby Dodd's football teams won 7 of 17 games played against Alabama. The contests were annual events until Georgia Tech withdrew from the SEC.

Dodd considered his two biggest victories to have come against Alabama, including a 7–3 victory in 1952 and a 7–6 victory in 1962. The former victory secured a perfect season for Georgia Tech which led to a national title. The latter victory came against a top ranked Alabama team and cost the Crimson Tide another national title. Alabama head coach Bear Bryant once said that he would rather look across the field and see anyone other than Bobby Dodd.

==== Georgia ====
Dodd also understood the deep-seated rivalry with the Georgia Bulldogs. His teams won eight games in a row over Georgia from 1949 to 1956, outscoring the Bulldogs 176–39. This 8–game winning streak has since been tied by UGA and is still commonly referred to as "The Drought" by UGA football fans. Dodd finish his career with a 12–10 record against the Bulldogs.

=== "Dodd's luck" ===
By the end of his coaching career, Dodd had built a reputation not only as a good coach, but also as a lucky one. Georgia Tech often played teams that were physically superior but Bobby Dodd would still find a way to win. The experts called it "Dodd's luck", but his success actually came from an understanding of motivational psychology, football strategy, and innovative game-planning. University of Georgia's longtime football coach Wallace Butts once said "If Bobby Dodd were trapped in the center of an H-Bomb explosion, he'd walk away with his pockets full of marketable uranium." However, the following describes Dodd's perspective regarding his luck:

Lucky. Bet your life I am lucky. I'm lucky and so are my teams. It's a habit. You know, if you think you're lucky you are.

— Bobby Dodd

=== Athletic director (1950–1976) ===
In 1967, Dodd stepped down as head football coach due to health concerns, and he was succeeded by assistant Bud Carson. Dodd simply retained his athletic director position, which he had acquired in 1950 from William Alexander. Dodd retired as athletic director in 1976 and was followed in the position by Doug Weaver. Dodd continued to serve during his retirement years as an Alumni Association consultant and as a fundraiser for Georgia Tech. In 1983, he expressed interest in running a United States Football League team if Atlanta were awarded one, but the league folded before Atlanta received a team.

== Legacy ==
Dodd was inducted into the College Football Hall of Fame as a player in 1959 and as a coach in 1993. He was voted Southeastern Conference Coach of the Year by his fellow coaches in 1951, and "National Coach of the Year" by the New York Daily News poll in 1952. After retiring, he was awarded a special "Citation of Honor" by the Football Writers Association of America for his accomplishments and contributions to football. Dodd also developed 22 recognized All-America football players as head football coach. Dodd was also inducted into the Virginia Sports Hall of Fame in 1973. Coach Dodd has also received honors not related to football. The Bobby Dodd Institute is an organization that helps people with disabilities; it is named in honor of Coach Dodd for his assistance to the disabled.

=== Bobby Dodd Stadium ===
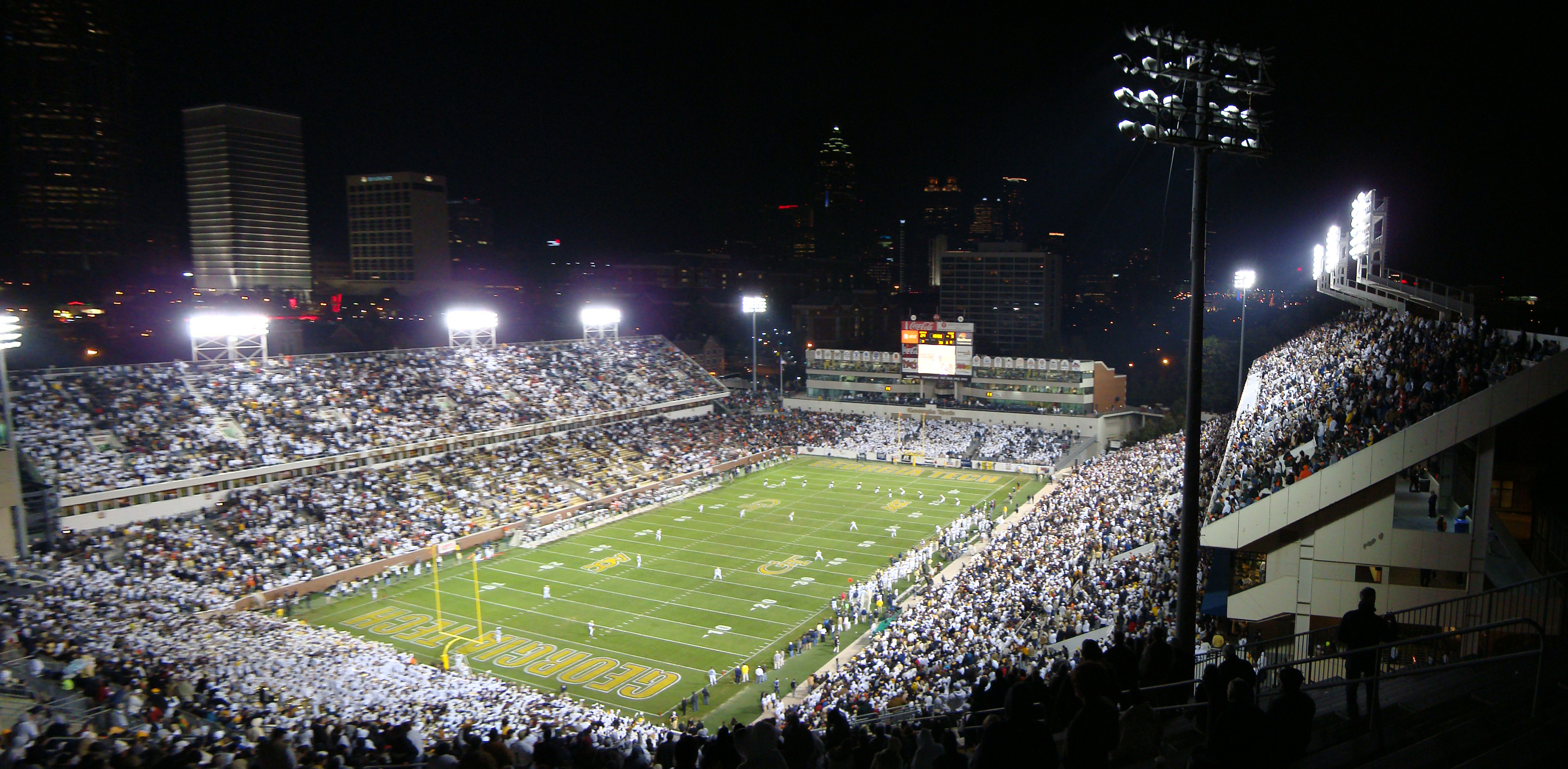
Bobby Dodd Stadium at Grant Field

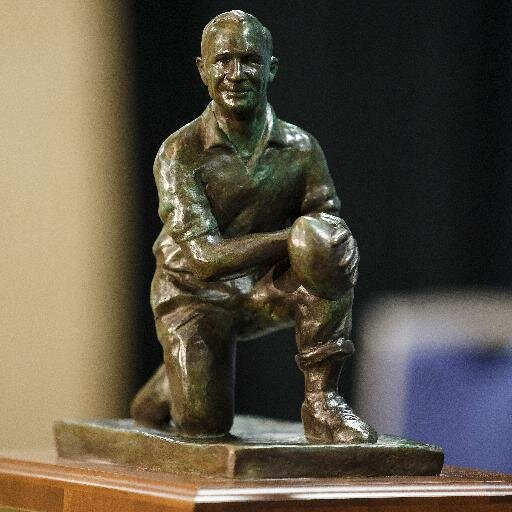
Bobby Dodd Trophy

Georgia Tech named its stadium Bobby Dodd Stadium in honor of the legendary coach in April 1988, two months before he died. In 1989 part of Third Street located next to Bobby Dodd Stadium was rechristened Bobby Dodd Way. On Friday September 14, 2012, Georgia Tech provided another honor for the former coach by unveiling the Bobby Dodd statue in Callaway Plaza on the Georgia Tech campus, which was funded by former players for Coach Dodd. In attendance for the unveiling were the athletic director, members of the 1952 national championship squad, President of the Institute Bud Peterson, Head Coach Paul Johnson, and Bobby Dodd's son and daughter.

=== Bobby Dodd Coach of the Year Award ===
While Bobby Dodd was a determined competitor, he cared deeply for those who played for him. Unlike some other coaches, he did not believe in winning at any costs; he truly believed that the most important aspect of college football was the college football player. As a testament to the character of Bobby Dodd, each year a Division I college coach whose team excels on the field, in the classroom, and in the community is awarded the Bobby Dodd Coach of the Year Award, presented by the Bobby Dodd Coach of the Year Foundation. (Note: The similarly named Georgia Tech coach Bobby Ross won the award following the 1990 football season.)

=== Georgia Tech's withdrawal from SEC ===
Dodd's tenure included Georgia Tech's withdrawal from the Southeastern Conference (SEC) after the 1963 season.

==== Feud with Bear Bryant ====
The initial spark for Dodd's withdrawal was a historic feud with Alabama Crimson Tide coach Bear Bryant. The feud began when Tech was playing the Tide at Legion Field in Birmingham in 1961. After a Tech punt, Alabama fair-caught the ball. Chick Graning of Tech was playing coverage and relaxed after the signal for the fair catch. Darwin Holt of Alabama continued play and smashed his elbow into Graning's face, causing severe fracturing in his face, a broken nose, and blood-filled sinuses. Graning was knocked unconscious and suffered a severe concussion, the result of which left him unable to play football again. Dodd sent Bryant a letter asking Bryant to suspend Holt after game film indicated Holt had intentionally injured Graning; but Bryant never suspended Holt. The lack of discipline infuriated Dodd and sparked Dodd's interest in withdrawing from the SEC. (Georgia Tech lost that game 10–0, and Alabama went on to win its first Associated Press national championship.)

==== Over-recruitment ====
Another issue of concern for Dodd was Alabama's and other SEC schools' over-recruitment of players. Universities would recruit more players than available space on their rosters. During the summer the teams in question would cut the players well after signing day. This practice prevented the cut players from being able to play for other colleges during the following football season. Dodd appealed to the SEC administration to punish the "tryout camps" of his fellow SEC members but the SEC did not. Finally, Dodd withdrew Georgia Tech from the SEC after the 1963 football season. Tech would remain an independent like Notre Dame and Penn State (at the time) during the final three years of Dodd's coaching tenure.

Dodd insisted the only reason he left the SEC was due to the "140 Rule", which allowed colleges to over-recruit. The 140 Rule stated a college program could only have 140 football and basketball players on scholarship at any one time, but the teams were still allowed to sign up to 45 players a year. Therefore, if a school recruited its full allotment of players each year it would exceed the 140 maximum even with normal attrition. Dodd would sign about 30–32 football players a year to meet the guidelines, but the other schools in the SEC were offering 45 scholarships a year, and most were allotting all but a nominal amount to football. Players not good enough to fall under the 140 Rule had their scholarships withdrawn before the end of each year by the other schools. Dodd insisted the recruiting of athletes by this method amounted to nothing more than a tryout for a scholarship. Dodd would not allow any of the football players choosing Tech to be dismissed from Tech, just because they were not the best players. Dodd said, "It is not the recruit's fault for not making the squad, it was the coaches' fault for misjudging their talents." If a recruit came to Tech, he would stay on a football scholarship until he graduated.

Dodd wanted the SEC to limit the amount of scholarships to about 32 per year, which would keep the other schools from offering 45 scholarships, picking the best, and withdrawing scholarships from the rest. A vote was to be taken by the presidents of the colleges on the issue, and Dodd made it clear that Tech would leave the SEC unless the rule was changed. Bear had promised Dodd he would get his president to vote for Dodd's position, which would have changed the rule; when the meeting was held on January 24, 1964, the Alabama president voted against Dodd's position and the 140 Rule was upheld when the presidents split 6–6. Tech's president immediately walked to the podium and announced Tech was withdrawing from the SEC.

=== Integration ===
During Bobby Dodd's tenure, Georgia Tech played against several integrated football teams while the South was resisting integration. Georgia Tech played against Notre Dame in 1953 with Wayne Edmonds starting at offensive tackle and defensive end for the Irish. Edmonds was the first black player to win a monogram at Notre Dame. Georgia Tech lost to Notre Dame 27–14.

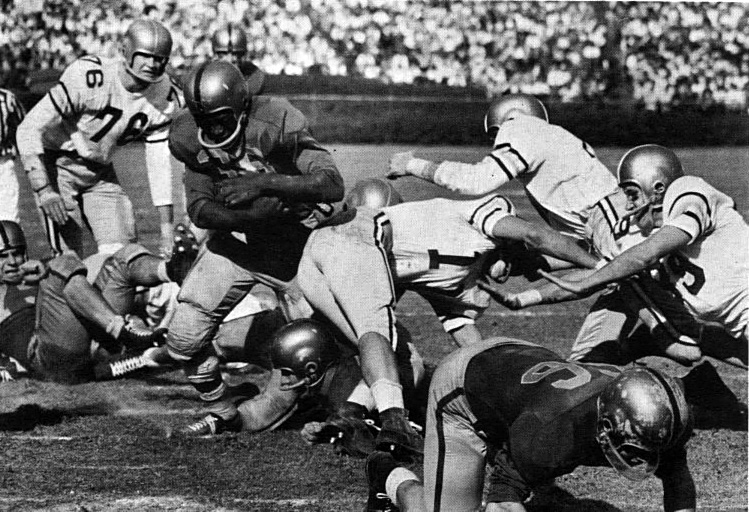
Bobby Grier at the controversial 1956 Sugar Bowl

Georgia Tech also participated in the first integrated bowl game in the Deep South. The 1956 Sugar Bowl featured the 7th ranked Georgia Tech Yellow Jackets, and the 11th ranked Pitt Panthers. There was controversy over whether Bobby Grier from Pitt should be allowed to play because he was black, and whether Georgia Tech should even play at all due to Georgia governor Marvin Griffin's opposition to integration. Governor Griffin threatened Tech's Blake R. Van Leer publicly after he let the game go forward. Dodd would back Van Leer's decision as well. Ultimately, Bobby Grier played, which made the game the first integrated Sugar Bowl and the first integrated bowl game in the Deep South. Georgia Tech won the 1956 Sugar Bowl by the score 7–0.

As athletic director Dodd oversaw the integration of Georgia Tech's football team. Eddie McAshan was the first African American football player to start for Georgia Tech. Bud Carson started McAshan in 1970 at quarterback as a sophomore and McAshan would go on to set several career records for Georgia Tech (which have since been broken by Shawn Jones and Joe Hamilton). McAshan's first career start was on September 12, 1970, against South Carolina. His start marked the first time that an African American had ever started at quarterback for a major Southeastern university and McAshan did not disappoint. He rallied Tech from a fourth-quarter deficit, defeating the Gamecocks 23–20 with two late touchdown drives. McAshan threw for 32 touchdowns during his college football career, and Georgia Tech had a 22–13–1 record during that time frame.

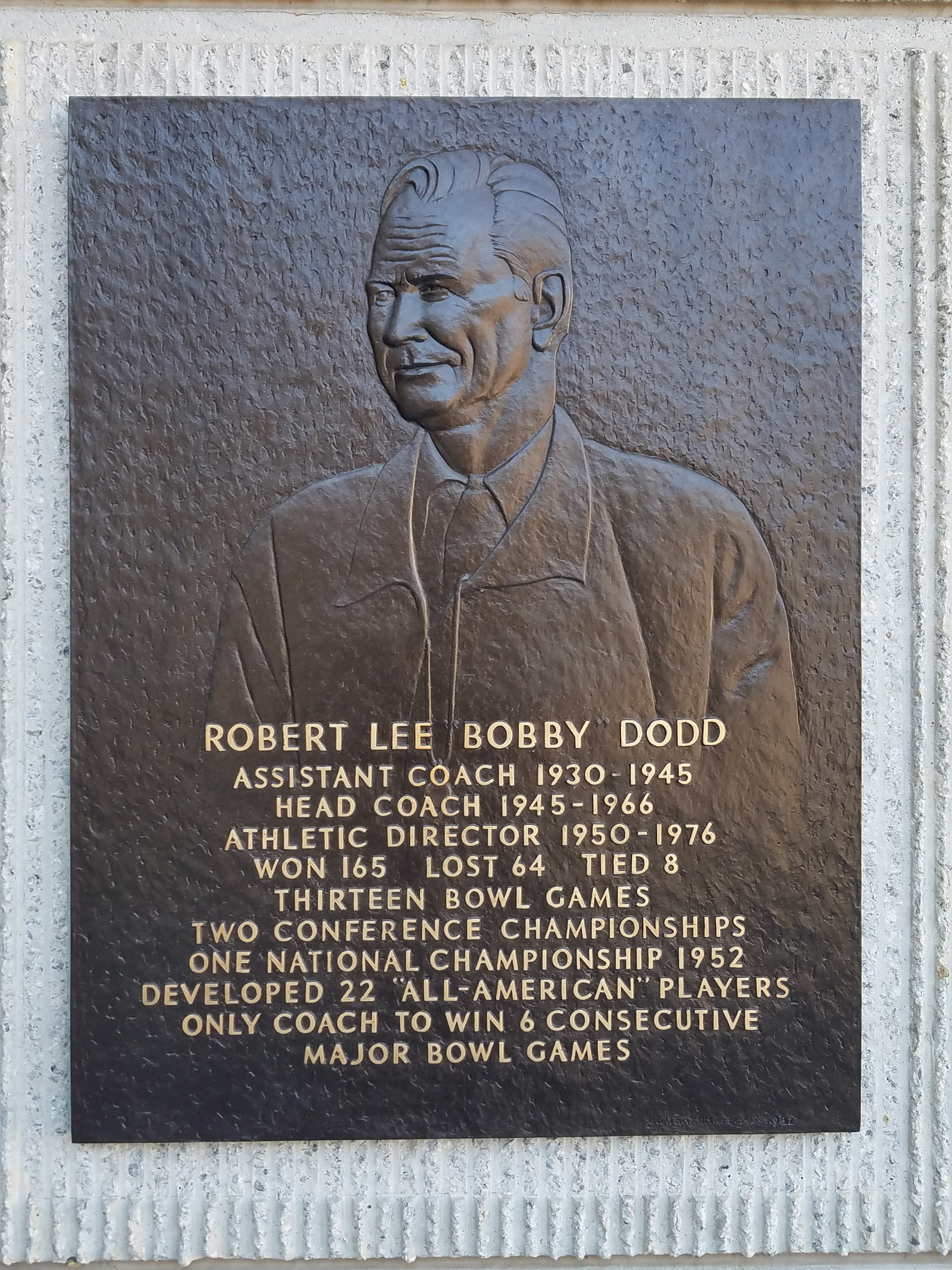
Plaque at Georgia Tech honoring Dodd

==== Coaching tree ====
Many coaches have been influenced by Dodd's style and approach to the game, including Vince Dooley, University of Georgia's longtime football coach, who was the first recipient of the Bobby Dodd Coach of the Year Award. In addition, several assistant coaches for Bobby Dodd went on to have successful careers as head football coaches for other colleges, including Frank Broyles with Arkansas. Broyles led the Razorbacks to a 14–7 victory over the Yellow Jackets in the 1960 Gator Bowl, which was the first bowl game Georgia Tech had lost with Bobby Dodd as head coach.

Dodd's coaching tree includes:

1. Frank Broyles, Dodd assistant, coached at Arkansas
2. Vince Dooley, influenced by Dodd's style, coached at Georgia
3. Ray Graves, Dodd assistant, coached at Florida
4. Pepper Rodgers, Tech quarterback, coached at Kansas
5. Jim Carlen, Tech player and assistant, coached at Texas Tech, West Virginia, and South Carolina

== Family, personal life, and death ==
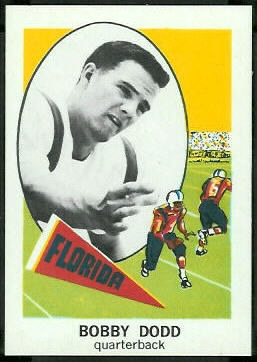
Bobby Dodd Jr. football card

Dodd married Alice Davis in 1933, and they had two children, Linda Dodd Thompson and Robert Lee Dodd Jr., who played quarterback for the University of Florida from 1960–61. Dodd Jr. had wanted to play for Georgia Tech, but Dodd thought it would be best if he played for another college. On October 1, 1960, Dodd Jr. contributed to Florida's 18–17 upset of the Yellow Jackets at Florida Field with Ray Graves, Dodd's former assistant, as Gator head coach.

Alice Davis was a younger sister to Wink Davis, who played halfback at Georgia Tech. Dodd met Alice in 1931 through Ed Hamm, who was the track coach. They went on a few double dates together before Bobby started dating Alice. They postponed their wedding until after the 1933 football season since Dodd was coaching his future brother-in-law.

Bobby Dodd and Bear Bryant ended their feud in 1975 after Bill Curry helped negotiate a peace settlement between the two old football coaches. As a result, Georgia Tech and Alabama resumed their series from 1979–1984.

Dodd stayed in touch with many of his former football players over the years and he was like a father to them until his death. "The record I am most proud of", he said, "is from all those years of coaching I probably don't have five former players who are bitter at me or Georgia Tech....means more than the number of games we won." He died on June 21, 1988, at the age of 79, in Atlanta.

Alice Dodd was named honorary alumnus of the Georgia Tech Alumni Association in 1967. After her husband's death in 1988, she continued to attend homecoming functions and special events, such as the 1991 Florida Citrus Bowl which led to Georgia Tech winning its fourth national championship. Dodd will be portrayed in the upcoming film Bowl Game Armageddon about the 1956 Sugar Bowl.

== Head coaching record ==
External images
- Pictures of Bobby Dodd with
- Mack Tharpe
- William Alexander
- GT Football Team 1938
- Ray Graves and Frank Broyles
- Guard Franklin Brooks
- 100 Wins
- Wife & Children 1952
- GT Football team 1966
- Bill Curry 1976
- Bobby Dodd
- Pictures of Bobby Dodd statue
- Boddy Dodd Statue
- Plaque for Bobby Dodd Statue
- Dodd's Boys Plaque

=== Football ===
Year	Team	Overall	Conference	Standing	Bowl/playoffs	Coaches^{#}	AP^{°}
Georgia Tech Yellow Jackets (Southeastern Conference) (1945–1963)
1945	Georgia Tech	4–6	2–2	T–5th			
1946	Georgia Tech	9–2	4–2	4th	W Oil		11
1947	Georgia Tech	10–1	4–1	2nd	W Orange		10
1948	Georgia Tech	7–3	4–3	5th			
1949	Georgia Tech	7–3	5–2	4th			
1950	Georgia Tech	5–6	4–2	5th			
1951	Georgia Tech	11–0–1	7–0	T–1st	W Orange	5	5
1952	Georgia Tech	12–0	7–0	1st	W Sugar	2	2
1953	Georgia Tech	9–2–1	4–1–1	T–2nd	W Sugar	9	8
1954	Georgia Tech	8–3	6–2	2nd	W Cotton	11	
1955	Georgia Tech	9–1–1	4–1–1	2nd	W Sugar	7	7
1956	Georgia Tech	10–1	7–1	2nd	W Gator	4	4
1957	Georgia Tech	4–4–2	3–4–1	8th			
1958	Georgia Tech	5–4–1	2–3–1	8th			
1959	Georgia Tech	6–5	3–3	7th	L Gator		
1960	Georgia Tech	5–5	4–4	7th			
1961	Georgia Tech	7–4	4–3	T–4th	L Gator	13	13
1962	Georgia Tech	7–3–1	5–2	4th	L Bluebonnet	11	
1963	Georgia Tech	7–3	4–3	6th			
Georgia Tech Yellow Jackets (NCAA University Division independent) (1964–1966)
1964	Georgia Tech	7–3					
1965	Georgia Tech	7–3–1			W Gator		
1966	Georgia Tech	9–2			L Orange	8	8
Georgia Tech:		165–64–8	82–39–4				
Total:		165–64–8					
National championship Conference title Conference division title or championship game berth
^{#}Rankings from final Coaches Poll.; ^{°}Rankings from final AP Poll.

== Baseball ==
Record table
Season	Team	Overall	Conference	Standing	Postseason
Georgia Tech Yellow Jackets (Southern Conference) (1932)
1932	Georgia Tech	4–11–1			
Georgia Tech Yellow Jackets (Southeastern Conference) (1933–1939)
1933	Georgia Tech	4–10	3–7		
1934	Georgia Tech	10–10	8–9		
1935	Georgia Tech	7–6	3–3		
1936	No team				
1937	Georgia Tech	4–7	4–7	6th	
1938	Georgia Tech	7–10	5–8	7th	
1939	Georgia Tech	7–10	3–9	10th	
Georgia Tech:		43–64–2			
Total:		43–64–2			
