= Buford Long =

American football player (1931–2006)

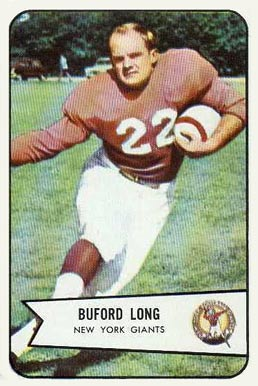
- Long on 1954 Bowman football card

No. 22
- Positions: Defensive back, halfback, end

Personal information
- Born: December 14, 1931; Lake Wales, Florida, U.S.
- Died: September 1, 2006 (aged 74); Wauchula, Florida, U.S.
- Listed height: 6 ft 1 in (1.85 m)
- Listed weight: 195 lb (88 kg)

Career information
- High school: Lake Wales
- College: Florida (1949–1952)
- NFL draft: 1953: 5th round, 58th overall pick

Career history
- New York Giants (1953–1955)

Awards and highlights
- Third-team All-SEC (1952); Florida–Georgia Hall of Fame; University of Florida Athletic Hall of Fame

Career NFL statistics
- Receptions: 33
- Receiving yards: 462
- Rushing yards: 164
- Rushing average: 3.2
- Total touchdowns: 5
- Interceptions: 3
- Stats at Pro Football Reference

Buford Eugene Long (December 14, 1931 – September 1, 2006) was an American college and professional football player who was a defensive back, halfback and end in the National Football League (NFL) for three seasons during the 1950s. Long played college football for the University of Florida, and thereafter, he played professionally for the New York Giants of the NFL.

== Early life ==
Long was born in Lake Wales, Florida, in 1931. He attended Lake Wales High School, where he played high school football for the Lake Wales Highlanders.

== College career ==
Long attended the University of Florida in Gainesville, Florida, where he played for coach Bob Woodruff's Florida Gators football team from 1950 to 1952. In an era when the college football rules permitted only limited player substitutions, Long played on both offense and defense, and was a standout halfback and defensive back. Memorably, as a senior in 1952, Long ran seventy-seven yards for a touchdown in the Gators' 30–0 upset of their rivals, the Georgia Bulldogs. Long was a key member of the Gators' 1952 backfield that included fullback Rick Casares and quarterback Doug Dickey and led the Gators to an 8–3 season and a 14–13 victory over the Tulsa Golden Hurricane—their first-ever NCAA-sanctioned post-season bowl game. Memorably, as a senior, he had 77-yard touchdown run to help defeat the rival Georgia Bulldogs 30–0. Bob Woodruff ranked Long as one of the three best backs to play for the Gators during the 1950s.

During his senior season, Long rushed for fourteen touchdowns, and was a third-team All-Southeastern Conference (SEC) selection. He finished his college career with twenty-five rushing touchdowns, which still ranks eighth on the Gators' all-time career records list. Long also earned varsity letters as a member of the Florida Gators baseball and track and field teams.

He graduated from Florida with a bachelor's degree in physical education in 1955, and was later inducted into the University of Florida Athletic Hall of Fame as a "Gator Great."

== Professional career ==
The New York Giants selected Long in the fifth round (58th overall) of the 1953 NFL draft. He played for the Giants for three seasons from 1953 to 1955. In his three-year NFL career, Long played in twenty-six games, rushed fifty-two times for 164 yards and a touchdown, had thirty-three receptions for 462 yards and four touchdowns, made three interceptions, and returned twenty-three kickoffs for 607 yards.

Long died September 1, 2006, at his home in Wauchula; he was 74 years old.

== See also ==
- Florida Gators football, 1950–59
- List of Florida Gators in the NFL draft
- List of New York Giants players
- List of University of Florida alumni
- University of Florida Athletic Hall of Fame
