= Chick Graning =

American musician

- Born: October 28, 1966 (age 59); Knoxville, Tennessee, U.S.
- Genres: Alternative rock; indie rock
- Occupation: Musician
- Instruments: Vocals, guitar
- Formerly of: Anastasia Screamed; Scarce

Chick Graning (born October 28, 1966) is an American musician and record producer associated with the Boston alternative rock scene in the 1980s and 1990s. Graning was the vocalist, guitarist, and songwriter for the bands Anastasia Screamed and Scarce.

== Early life ==
Graning was born in Knoxville, Tennessee and graduated from South-Doyle High School in 1985. He played in punk bands around the area before moving to Boston, Massachusetts to attend the Berklee College of Music.

== Career ==
In 1987, Graning joined the alternative rock band Anastasia Screamed after meeting the band's members on a bus. Graning, who took over vocal duties from Andy Jagolinzer, relocated the band to Knoxville. Their first album, Laughing Down the Limehouse, was released in 1990 by the Fire Records subsidiary, the Roughneck Recording Company. Moontime, the group's second album, released the following year and toured with Throwing Muses to promote the album. Mike Gunderloy of Factsheet Five described the band as "a dental drill of noise, heavy on momentum...post-hardcore meets rockabilly". Anastasia Screamed folded in 1992.

By 1992, he regrouped in New England and played slide guitar and E-bow on Hey Babe, the debut album of Juliana Hatfield. The next year, Graning joined with Joyce Raskin and Jud Ehrbar in Providence, Rhode Island to form Scarce. Graning also performed on Belly's first album Star, contributing slide guitar, vocals, and guitar on three tracks. Scarce recorded their first EP, Red, which contained five songs written by Graning. By 1994, the group obtained a following in Europe and were frequently compared to R.E.M., Nirvana, and David Bowie. The band played with Juliana Hatfield, Pavement, Fugazi, Grant Lee Buffalo, Echobelly, Madder Rose, Shudder to Think, and Helium and gained notoriety for their live performances. The band supported Hole on a European tour while A&M Records signed the band and aimed to release their debut album DeadSexy, produced by Graning and Kevin Salem, in July 1995.

In June 1995, Graning suffered a brain aneurysm while on his way to a rehearsal. The singer was in a coma for 18 days and required brain surgery. Raskin and Scarce's newly appointed drummer Joseph Propatier played acoustic shows in the interim. A&M delayed the release of the album until February. Graning spent an extra two months in the hospital after waking up and had to relearn how to walk, talk, and play guitar. Scarce resumed touring by the end of the year and re-recorded DeadSexy, which received a proper release in the United States in July 1996, while "All Sideways" and "Honeysimple" made appearances on the soundtracks for The Babysitter and Boys respectively. However, the remainder of the band's tour was "miserable" for all involved. Graning described himself as "an emotional flatline", which heavily strained his relationship with Raskin, leading to Scarce's dissolution in 1997.

The musician worked as a stagehand and established himself as a solo act at the end of 1996, performing a show at the The Middle East in Cambridge. Graning opened for Ben Lee and 16 Horsepower in the Boston area and moved to New York by 1999. Graning recorded new songs with Pete Donnelly and played shows with Delta Clutch as his backing band. That same year, Graning added backing vocals on Donnelly's self-released album Another Day On You. M.T., Graning's first solo record, released in 2001 from Wald & Wiesen Tonträger and featured appearances from Donnelly, Nate Leavitt, Delissa Santos, Paul Myers, Quentin Jennings of The Dylans, and Christopher Cugini of Anastasia Screamed. In support of M.T., Graning toured Germany. That same year, Graning provided vocals to the title track of Chris Whitley's Rocket House.

By 2007, Graning, Raskin, and Propatier reformed Scarce. Raskin completed a memoir of her time in Scarce and called Graning to reconnect. The group toured Canada and Europe and self-released Tattoos And Parades, And Yesterdays in 2008. The band's third full-length album, The Fall And Rise Of Circus Boy Blue, was released in 2011 and served as a companion album to Raskin's book of the same name. In 2013, Graning played solo shows in Tennessee and considered releasing a second solo record. M.T. received a re-issue from Wouldn't Waste Records in 2018 and featured new cover artwork painted by Raskin.

== Personal life ==
Graning currently resides in Knoxville, Tennessee. As a teenager, Graning was a passenger in a near-fatal car accident, an incident that inspired the Scarce single "All Sideways". He was friends with punk rock singer Rus Harper and blues rock musician Chris Whitley, the latter of whom gifted Graning a Dobro while he was recovering in the hospital.

He was engaged to musician Tanya Donelly. The track "Low Red Moon" on Star was written about Graning, while Graning wrote "Glamorizing Cigarettes" about Donelly.

== Discography ==
=== Solo ===
- M.T. (2001)

=== Anastasia Screamed ===
- Laughing Down the Limehouse (1990)
- Moontime (1991)

=== Scarce ===
- DeadSexy (1996)
- Tattoos and Parades, and Yesterdays (2008)
- The Fall and Rise of Circus Boy Blue (2011)
