= 1952 Tulane Green Wave football team =

American college football season

1952 Tulane Green Wave football
- Conference: Southeastern Conference
- Record: 5–5 (3–5 SEC)
- Head coach: Raymond Wolf (1st season)
- Home stadium: Tulane Stadium

1952 Southeastern Conference football standings
	Conf.					Overall
Team	W		L		T	W		L		T
No. 2 Georgia Tech $	7	–	0	–	0	12	–	0	–	0
No. 8 Tennessee	5	–	0	–	1	8	–	2	–	1
No. 7 Ole Miss	4	–	0	–	2	8	–	1	–	2
No. 9 Alabama	4	–	2	–	0	10	–	2	–	0
Georgia	4	–	3	–	0	7	–	4	–	0
No. 15 Florida	3	–	3	–	0	8	–	3	–	0
Mississippi State	3	–	4	–	0	5	–	4	–	0
Tulane	3	–	5	–	0	5	–	5	–	0
No. 20 Kentucky	1	–	3	–	2	5	–	4	–	2
LSU	2	–	5	–	0	3	–	7	–	0
Vanderbilt	1	–	4	–	1	3	–	5	–	2
Auburn	0	–	7	–	0	2	–	8	–	0
$ – Conference champion; Rankings from AP Poll

The 1952 Tulane Green Wave football team was an American football team that represented Tulane University during the 1952 college football season as a member of the Southeastern Conference (SEC). In its first year under head coach Raymond Wolf, Tulane compiled a 5–5 record (3–5 in conference games), finished eighth in the SEC, and outscored opponents by a total of 188 to 146.

The Green Wave played its home games at Tulane Stadium in New Orleans.

== Schedule ==
Date	Opponent	Site	Result	Attendance	Source
September 27	Georgia	Tulane Stadium; New Orleans, LA	L 16–21		
October 4	Santa Clara*	Tulane Stadium; New Orleans, LA	W 35–0		
October 11	at No. 5 Georgia Tech	Grant Field; Atlanta, GA	L 0–14	27,913	
October 18	Ole Miss	Tulane Stadium; New Orleans, LA (rivalry)	L 14–20	38,000	
October 25	vs. Auburn	Ladd Memorial Stadium; Mobile, AL (rivalry)	W 21–6	20,022	
November 1	Mississippi State	Tulane Stadium; New Orleans, LA	W 34–21		
November 8	at Kentucky	McLean Stadium; Lexington, KY	L 6–27	31,000	
November 15	Vanderbilt	Tulane Stadium; New Orleans, LA	W 16–7	26,000	
November 22	Louisiana College*	Tulane Stadium; New Orleans, LA	W 46–14		
November 29	LSU	Tulane Stadium; New Orleans, LA (Battle for the Rag)	L 0–16		
*Non-conference game; Rankings from AP Poll released prior to the game
