= 1952 Florida Gators football team =

American college football season

1952 Florida Gators football

Gator Bowl, W 14–13 vs. Tulsa
- Conference: Southeastern Conference

Ranking
- AP: No. 15
- Record: 8–3 (3–3 SEC)
- Head coach: Bob Woodruff (3rd season)
- Home stadium: Florida Field

1952 Southeastern Conference football standings
	Conf.					Overall
Team	W		L		T	W		L		T
No. 2 Georgia Tech $	7	–	0	–	0	12	–	0	–	0
No. 8 Tennessee	5	–	0	–	1	8	–	2	–	1
No. 7 Ole Miss	4	–	0	–	2	8	–	1	–	2
No. 9 Alabama	4	–	2	–	0	10	–	2	–	0
Georgia	4	–	3	–	0	7	–	4	–	0
No. 15 Florida	3	–	3	–	0	8	–	3	–	0
Mississippi State	3	–	4	–	0	5	–	4	–	0
Tulane	3	–	5	–	0	5	–	5	–	0
No. 20 Kentucky	1	–	3	–	2	5	–	4	–	2
LSU	2	–	5	–	0	3	–	7	–	0
Vanderbilt	1	–	4	–	1	3	–	5	–	2
Auburn	0	–	7	–	0	2	–	8	–	0
$ – Conference champion; Rankings from AP Poll

The 1952 Florida Gators football team represented the University of Florida during the 1952 college football season. The season was Bob Woodruff's third and most successful as the head coach of the Florida Gators football team. Woodruff's 1952 Florida Gators finished with an overall record of 8–3 and a Southeastern Conference (SEC) record of 3–3, placing sixth among twelve SEC teams.

== Before the season ==
After Sullivan's early departure for the Boston Red Sox left the Gators without a starting quarterback, Doug Dickey advanced from seventh on the Gators' depth chart to starter. The Gators were led by fullback Rick Casares, halfback J. "Pappa" Hall, alternating quarterbacks Doug Dickey and Fred Robinson, and lineman Charlie LaPradd, the Gators' lightest tackle and one of their two captains. (Note: LaPradd became a football coach at FSU and then president of St. John's River Community College in Palatka.) Also in the backfield was Buford Long.

== Schedule ==
Date	Opponent	Rank	Site	Result	Attendance	Source
September 20	Stetson*		Florida Field; Gainesville, FL	W 33–6	20,000	
September 27	at Georgia Tech		Grant Field; Atlanta, GA	L 14–17	30,939	
October 4	vs. The Citadel*		Gator Bowl Stadium; Jacksonville, FL	W 33–0	21,000	
October 11	Clemson*		Florida Field; Gainesville, FL	W 54–13	25,000	
October 18	at Vanderbilt		Dudley Field; Nashville, TN	L 13–20	20,000	
October 25	vs. Georgia	No. 20	Gator Bowl Stadium; Jacksonville, FL (rivalry)	W 30–0	37,000	
November 1	Auburn	No. 17	Florida Field; Gainesville, FL (rivalry)	W 31–21	35,500	
November 15	at No. 7 Tennessee	No. 18	Shields–Watkins Field; Knoxville, TN (rivalry)	L 12–26	35,000	
November 22	Miami (FL)*		Florida Field; Gainesville, FL (rivalry)	W 43–6	35,000	
December 6	No. 19 Kentucky	No. 17	Florida Field; Gainesville, FL (rivalry)	W 27–0	29,000	
January 1, 1953	vs. No. 12 Tulsa*	No. 15	Gator Bowl Stadium; Jacksonville, FL (Gator Bowl)	W 14–13	30,015	
*Non-conference game; Rankings from AP Poll released prior to the game

== Game summaries ==
=== Stetson ===
The season opened with a 33–6 defeat of the Stetson Hatters.

=== Georgia Tech ===
The national champion Georgia Tech Yellow Jackets beat Florida on a last-second field goal, 14–17.

=== Citadel ===
The Citadel lost to Florida 33–0.

=== Clemson ===
Florida blew out the Clemson Tigers 54–13.

=== Vanderbilt ===
On a cold Dudley Field, Florida lost to Vanderbilt 20–13.

=== Georgia ===
The Gators dominated rival Georgia 33–0 in Jacksonville, remaining the Gators' largest victory over the Bulldogs for almost forty years. Casares ran for 108 yards, kicked a field goal, and made all the extra points. Even National champion Georgia Tech needed a last-second field goal to defeat the Gators.

=== Auburn ===
The defeat of Georgia was followed by another conference victory, 31–21 over Auburn Tigers.

=== Tennessee ===
The Tennessee Volunteers defeated the Gators 12–26.

=== Miami ===
The Gators had another blowout of the in-state rival Miami Hurricanes 43–6.

=== Kentucky ===
Florida defeated the Kentucky Wildcats 27–0.

== Postseason ==
The season ended with the Gators' first appearance in an NCAA-sanctioned bowl game, a closely matched 14–13 Gator Bowl victory over the Tulsa Golden Hurricane on January 1, 1953, in which star fullback Rick Casares kicked the winning extra points for the margin of victory.

LaPradd was All-American.

== Bibliography ==
- Golenbock, Peter (2002). Go Gators! An Oral History of Florida's Pursuit of Gridiron Glory. St. Petersburg, Florida: Legends Publishing, LLC. ISBN 0-9650782-1-3.
- McCarthy, Kevin M (2000). Fightin' Gators: A History of University of Florida Football. Mount Pleasant, South Carolina: Arcadia Publishing. ISBN 978-0-7385-0559-6.
