= 1952 LSU Tigers football team =

American college football season

1952 LSU Tigers football
- Conference: Southeastern Conference
- Record: 3–7 (2-5 SEC)
- Head coach: Gaynell Tinsley (5th season)
- Home stadium: Tiger Stadium

1952 Southeastern Conference football standings
	Conf.					Overall
Team	W		L		T	W		L		T
No. 2 Georgia Tech $	7	–	0	–	0	12	–	0	–	0
No. 8 Tennessee	5	–	0	–	1	8	–	2	–	1
No. 7 Ole Miss	4	–	0	–	2	8	–	1	–	2
No. 9 Alabama	4	–	2	–	0	10	–	2	–	0
Georgia	4	–	3	–	0	7	–	4	–	0
No. 15 Florida	3	–	3	–	0	8	–	3	–	0
Mississippi State	3	–	4	–	0	5	–	4	–	0
Tulane	3	–	5	–	0	5	–	5	–	0
No. 20 Kentucky	1	–	3	–	2	5	–	4	–	2
LSU	2	–	5	–	0	3	–	7	–	0
Vanderbilt	1	–	4	–	1	3	–	5	–	2
Auburn	0	–	7	–	0	2	–	8	–	0
$ – Conference champion; Rankings from AP Poll

The 1952 LSU Tigers football team was an American football team that represented Louisiana State University (LSU) as a member of the Southeastern Conference (SEC) during the 1952 college football season. In their fifth year under head coach Gaynell Tinsley, the Tigers compiled an overall record of 3–7, with a conference record of 2–5, and finished 10th in the SEC.

== Schedule ==
Date	Opponent	Site	Result	Attendance	Source
September 20	No. 11 Texas*	Tiger Stadium; Baton Rouge, LA	L 14–35	44,000	
September 27	at Alabama	Tiger Stadium; Baton Rouge, LA (rivalry)	L 20–21	34,000	
October 4	at No. 17 Rice*	Rice Stadium; Houston, TX	W 27–7	45,000	
October 11	at No. 13 Kentucky	McLean Stadium; Lexington, KY	W 34–7		
October 18	Georgia	Tiger Stadium; Baton Rouge, LA	L 14–27	37,000	
October 25	at No. 2 Maryland	Byrd Stadium; College Park, MD	L 6–34	30,000	
November 1	at Ole Miss	Hemingway Stadium; Oxford, MS (rivalry)	L 0–28	22,500	
November 8	Tennessee^{†}	Tiger Stadium; Baton Rouge, LA	L 3–22	35,000	
November 15	Mississippi State	Tiger Stadium; Baton Rouge, LA (rivalry)	L 14–33	20,000	
November 29	at Tulane	Tulane Stadium; New Orleans, LA (Battle for the Rag)	W 16–0		
*Non-conference game; ^{†}Homecoming; Rankings from AP Poll released prior to the game
