= 1952 Auburn Tigers football team =

American college football season

1952 Auburn Tigers football
- Conference: Southeastern Conference
- Record: 2–8 (0–7 SEC)
- Head coach: Ralph Jordan (2nd season)
- Home stadium: Cliff Hare Stadium; Legion Field; Ladd Memorial Stadium

1952 Southeastern Conference football standings
| | Conf. | | | | | Overall |
| Team | W | | L | | T | W | | L | | T |
|---|---|---|---|---|---|---|---|---|---|---|
| No. 2 Georgia Tech $ | 7 | – | 0 | – | 0 | 12 | – | 0 | – | 0 |
| No. 8 Tennessee | 5 | – | 0 | – | 1 | 8 | – | 2 | – | 1 |
| No. 7 Ole Miss | 4 | – | 0 | – | 2 | 8 | – | 1 | – | 2 |
| No. 9 Alabama | 4 | – | 2 | – | 0 | 10 | – | 2 | – | 0 |
| Georgia | 4 | – | 3 | – | 0 | 7 | – | 4 | – | 0 |
| No. 15 Florida | 3 | – | 3 | – | 0 | 8 | – | 3 | – | 0 |
| Mississippi State | 3 | – | 4 | – | 0 | 5 | – | 4 | – | 0 |
| Tulane | 3 | – | 5 | – | 0 | 5 | – | 5 | – | 0 |
| No. 20 Kentucky | 1 | – | 3 | – | 2 | 5 | – | 4 | – | 2 |
| LSU | 2 | – | 5 | – | 0 | 3 | – | 7 | – | 0 |
| Vanderbilt | 1 | – | 4 | – | 1 | 3 | – | 5 | – | 2 |
| Auburn | 0 | – | 7 | – | 0 | 2 | – | 8 | – | 0 |
$ – Conference champion; Rankings from AP Poll

The 1952 Auburn Tigers football team represented Auburn University in the 1952 college football season. It was the Tigers' 61st overall and 20th season as a member of the Southeastern Conference (SEC). The team was led by head coach Ralph "Shug" Jordan, in his second year, and played their home games at Cliff Hare Stadium in Auburn, Legion Field in Birmingham and Ladd Memorial Stadium in Mobile, Alabama. They finished with a record of two wins and eight losses (2–8 overall, 0–7 in the SEC).

== Schedule ==
| Date | Opponent | Site | Result | Attendance | Source |
|---|---|---|---|---|---|
| September 27 | No. 2 Maryland* | Legion Field; Birmingham, AL | L 7–13 | 27,000 | |
| October 4 | vs. No. 18 Ole Miss | Crump Stadium; Memphis, TN (rivalry) | L 7–20 | 14,007 | |
| October 11 | Wofford* | Cliff Hare Stadium; Auburn, AL | W 54–7 | | |
| October 18 | at No. 4 Georgia Tech | Grant Field; Atlanta, GA (rivalry) | L 0–33 | 34,689 | |
| October 25 | Tulane | Ladd Memorial Stadium; Mobile, AL (rivalry) | L 6–21 | 20,022 | |
| November 1 | at No. 20 Florida | Florida Field; Gainesville, FL (rivalry) | L 21–31 | 35,500 | |
| November 8 | Mississippi State^{†} | Cliff Hare Stadium; Auburn, AL | L 34–49 | 21,000 | |
| November 15 | vs. Georgia | Memorial Stadium; Columbus, GA (rivalry) | L 7–13 | 23,000 | |
| November 22 | Clemson* | Cliff Hare Stadium; Auburn, AL (rivalry) | W 3–0 | | |
| November 29 | vs. No. 8 Alabama | Legion Field; Birmingham, AL (Iron Bowl) | L 0–21 | 40,000 | |
*Non-conference game; ^{†}Homecoming; Rankings from AP Poll released prior to the game
