= 1952 Ole Miss Rebels football team =

American college football season

1952 Ole Miss Rebels football

Sugar Bowl, L 7–24 vs. Georgia Tech
- Conference: Southeastern Conference

Ranking
- Coaches: No. 7
- AP: No. 7
- Record: 8–1–2 (4–0–2 SEC)
- Head coach: Johnny Vaught (6th season)
- Captain: Kline Gilbert
- Home stadium: Hemingway Stadium

1952 Southeastern Conference football standings
	Conf.					Overall
Team	W		L		T	W		L		T
No. 2 Georgia Tech $	7	–	0	–	0	12	–	0	–	0
No. 8 Tennessee	5	–	0	–	1	8	–	2	–	1
No. 7 Ole Miss	4	–	0	–	2	8	–	1	–	2
No. 9 Alabama	4	–	2	–	0	10	–	2	–	0
Georgia	4	–	3	–	0	7	–	4	–	0
No. 15 Florida	3	–	3	–	0	8	–	3	–	0
Mississippi State	3	–	4	–	0	5	–	4	–	0
Tulane	3	–	5	–	0	5	–	5	–	0
No. 20 Kentucky	1	–	3	–	2	5	–	4	–	2
LSU	2	–	5	–	0	3	–	7	–	0
Vanderbilt	1	–	4	–	1	3	–	5	–	2
Auburn	0	–	7	–	0	2	–	8	–	0
$ – Conference champion; Rankings from AP Poll

The 1952 Ole Miss Rebels football team represented the University of Mississippi during the 1952 college football season. The Rebels were led by sixth-year head coach Johnny Vaught and played their home games at Hemingway Stadium in Oxford, Mississippi. Ole Miss finished the regular season undefeated and on a six-game winning streak, including a victory over reigning Sugar Bowl champion and previously undefeated Maryland. They were third in the Southeastern Conference, with a record of 8–0–2 (4–0–2 SEC), and ranked 7th in the AP Poll. The Rebels were invited to their first ever Sugar Bowl, where they lost to SEC champion Georgia Tech.

== Schedule ==
Date	Opponent	Rank	Site	Result	Attendance	Source
September 19	at Memphis State*		Crump Stadium; Memphis, TN (rivalry)	W 54–6	16,413	
September 27	at Kentucky		McLean Stadium; Lexington, KY	T 13–13	29,000	
October 4	vs. Auburn	No. 18	Crump Stadium; Memphis, TN	W 20–7	14,007	
October 11	at Vanderbilt		Dudley Field; Nashville, TN (rivalry)	T 21–21	23,000	
October 18	at Tulane		Tulane Stadium; New Orleans, LA (rivalry)	W 20–14	38,000	
October 25	at Arkansas*		War Memorial Stadium; Little Rock, AR (rivalry)	W 34–7	28,000	
November 1	LSU^{†}		Hemingway Stadium; Oxford, MS (rivalry)	W 28–0	22,500	
November 8	at Houston*	No. 14	Rice Stadium; Houston, TX	W 6–0	34,000–34,500	
November 15	No. 3 Maryland*	No. 11	Hemingway Stadium; Oxford, MS	W 21–14	32,500	
November 29	Mississippi State	No. 6	Hemingway Stadium; Oxford, MS (Egg Bowl)	W 20–14	28,000	
January 1	vs. No. 2 Georgia Tech*	No. 7	Tulane Stadium; New Orleans, LA (Sugar Bowl)	L 7–24	80,187	
*Non-conference game; ^{†}Homecoming; Rankings from AP Poll released prior to the game

== Roster ==
- C Ed Beatty
- OL Kline Gilbert
- QB Jimmy Lear
- FB Harol Lofton
- DB Jimmy Patton
- DE Jim Mask
- WR Bud Slay
- DB James Kelly
