= 2008 GMAC Bowl =

| Bowling Green Falcons | Tulsa Golden Hurricane |
| (8–4) | (9–4) |
| MAC | C-USA |
| 7 | 63 |
| Head coach: Gregg Brandon | Head coach: Todd Graham |
| | 1 | 2 | 3 | 4 | Total |
|---|---|---|---|---|---|
| Bowling Green | 0 | 0 | 7 | 0 | 7 |
| Tulsa | 21 | 14 | 14 | 14 | 63 |
- Date: January 6, 2008
- Season: 2007
- Stadium: Ladd–Peebles Stadium
- Location: Mobile, Alabama
- Favorite: Tulsa by 4½
- Attendance: 36,932
- Payout: US$750,000 per team

United States TV coverage
- Network: ESPN
- Announcers: Rece Davis, Mark May, Lou Holtz, & Rob Stone

The 2008 GMAC Bowl was an American college football bowl game. It was part of the 2007 NCAA Division I FBS football season and was the ninth annual playing of the game. It was played on January 6, 2008, at Ladd–Peebles Stadium in Mobile, Alabama, and featured the Bowling Green Falcons against the Tulsa Golden Hurricane.

== Notes ==
- Tulsa quarterback Paul Smith set an NCAA Division I record with his 14th consecutive 300-yard passing game.
- The 63–7 final score made this game the largest margin of victory in bowl history at the time, surpassing the 55-point margin set by Alabama over Syracuse in the 1953 Orange Bowl. The record was tied a decade later, when Army defeated Houston 70–14 in the 2018 Armed Forces Bowl. The record was tied again in 2023 when LSU defeated Purdue 63-7 in the Cheez It Citrus Bowl. This record would go on to be broken in the 2023 National Championship game, where Georgia would defeat TCU by a final score of 65–7.
- The game represented just the second matchup of the two teams in football. In 1989, Tulsa also beat Bowling Green in blowout fashion, 45–10.
