= 1952 Mississippi State Maroons football team =

American college football season

1952 Mississippi State Maroons football
- Conference: Southeastern Conference
- Record: 5–4 (3–4 SEC)
- Head coach: Murray Warmath (1st season)
- Home stadium: Scott Field

1952 Southeastern Conference football standings
	Conf.					Overall
Team	W		L		T	W		L		T
No. 2 Georgia Tech $	7	–	0	–	0	12	–	0	–	0
No. 8 Tennessee	5	–	0	–	1	8	–	2	–	1
No. 7 Ole Miss	4	–	0	–	2	8	–	1	–	2
No. 9 Alabama	4	–	2	–	0	10	–	2	–	0
Georgia	4	–	3	–	0	7	–	4	–	0
No. 15 Florida	3	–	3	–	0	8	–	3	–	0
Mississippi State	3	–	4	–	0	5	–	4	–	0
Tulane	3	–	5	–	0	5	–	5	–	0
No. 20 Kentucky	1	–	3	–	2	5	–	4	–	2
LSU	2	–	5	–	0	3	–	7	–	0
Vanderbilt	1	–	4	–	1	3	–	5	–	2
Auburn	0	–	7	–	0	2	–	8	–	0
$ – Conference champion; Rankings from AP Poll

The 1952 Mississippi State Maroons football team represented Mississippi State College during the 1952 college football season. It was the first season as head coach for Murray Warmath, and also for quarterback Jackie Parker, who transferred to Mississippi State from Jones County Junior College. Parker rushed for 16 touchdowns in 1952, a school record that stood until Vick Ballard broke it in 2010. Parker would win his first of two SEC "Player of the Year" honors by the Nashville Banner.

== Schedule ==
Date	Opponent	Site	Result	Attendance	Source
September 27	vs. No. 6 Tennessee	Crump Stadium; Memphis, TN	L 7–14	20,376	
October 4	Arkansas State*	Scott Field; Starkville, MS	W 41–14		
October 11	North Texas State*	Scott Field; Starkville, MS	W 14–0	12,000	
October 18	Kentucky^{†}	Scott Field; Starkville, MS	W 27–14	18,000	
October 25	at Alabama	Denny Stadium; Tuscaloosa, AL (rivalry)	L 19–42	25,000	
November 1	at Tulane	Tulane Stadium; New Orleans, LA	L 21–34		
November 8	at Auburn	Cliff Hare Stadium; Auburn, AL	W 49–34	21,000	
November 15	at LSU	Tiger Stadium; Baton Rouge, LA (rivalry)	W 33–14	20,000	
November 29	at No. 6 Ole Miss	Hemingway Stadium; Oxford, MS (Egg Bowl)	L 14–20	28,000	
*Non-conference game; ^{†}Homecoming; Rankings from AP Poll released prior to the game
