= 1952 Kentucky Wildcats football team =

American college football season

1952 Kentucky Wildcats football
- Conference: Southeastern Conference

Ranking
- Coaches: No. 19
- AP: No. 20
- Record: 5–4–2 (1–3–2 SEC)
- Head coach: Bear Bryant (7th season)
- Home stadium: McLean Stadium

1952 Southeastern Conference football standings
	Conf.					Overall
Team	W		L		T	W		L		T
No. 2 Georgia Tech $	7	–	0	–	0	12	–	0	–	0
No. 8 Tennessee	5	–	0	–	1	8	–	2	–	1
No. 7 Ole Miss	4	–	0	–	2	8	–	1	–	2
No. 9 Alabama	4	–	2	–	0	10	–	2	–	0
Georgia	4	–	3	–	0	7	–	4	–	0
No. 15 Florida	3	–	3	–	0	8	–	3	–	0
Mississippi State	3	–	4	–	0	5	–	4	–	0
Tulane	3	–	5	–	0	5	–	5	–	0
No. 20 Kentucky	1	–	3	–	2	5	–	4	–	2
LSU	2	–	5	–	0	3	–	7	–	0
Vanderbilt	1	–	4	–	1	3	–	5	–	2
Auburn	0	–	7	–	0	2	–	8	–	0
$ – Conference champion; Rankings from AP Poll

The 1952 Kentucky Wildcats football team represented the University of Kentucky in the 1952 college football season. The Wildcats scored 181 points while allowing 180 points. Kentucky finished the season ranked #20 in the final AP Poll. It was the seventh consecutive winning season for the Wildcats with Bear Bryant as the head coach.

== Schedule ==
Date	Opponent	Rank	Site	Result	Attendance	Source
September 20	Villanova*		McLean Stadium; Lexington, KY	L 6–25	33,000	
September 27	Ole Miss		McLean Stadium; Lexington, KY	T 13–13	29,000	
October 4	at No. 11 Texas A&M*		Kyle Field; College Station, TX	W 10–7	25,000	
October 11	LSU		McLean Stadium; Lexington, KY	L 7–34		
October 18	at Mississippi State		Scott Field; Starkville, MS	L 14–27	18,000	
October 25	at Cincinnati*		Nippert Stadium; Cincinnati, OH	W 14–6	27,000	
October 31	at Miami (FL)*		Burdine Stadium; Miami, FL	W 29–0	25,918	
November 8	Tulane		McLean Stadium; Lexington, KY	W 27–6	31,000	
November 15	Clemson*		McLean Stadium; Lexington, KY	W 27–14	25,000	
November 24	at No. 7 Tennessee		Shields–Watkins Field; Knoxville, TN (rivalry)	T 14–14	30,000	
December 6	at No. 17 Florida	No. 19	Florida Field; Gainesville, FL (rivalry)	L 0–27	29,000	
*Non-conference game; Rankings from AP Poll released prior to the game

== 1953 NFL draft ==
Player	Position	Round	Pick	NFL club
Bob Fry	Tackle	3	36	Los Angeles Rams
Gene Donaldson	Guard	3	37	Cleveland Browns
Ralph Charney	Back	11	125	Chicago Bears
Ray Correll	Guard	23	269	Pittsburgh Steelers
Ralph Paolone	Back	29	344	Philadelphia Eagles

== Awards and honors ==
- Steve Mellinger, Defensive End, All-America selection
