= 1952 Vanderbilt Commodores football team =

American college football season

1952 Vanderbilt Commodores football
- Conference: Southeastern Conference
- Record: 3–5–2 (1–4–1 SEC)
- Head coach: Bill Edwards (4th season)
- Offensive scheme: T formation
- Captains: John Cheadle; Don Wade
- Home stadium: Dudley Field

1952 Southeastern Conference football standings
	Conf.					Overall
Team	W		L		T	W		L		T
No. 2 Georgia Tech $	7	–	0	–	0	12	–	0	–	0
No. 8 Tennessee	5	–	0	–	1	8	–	2	–	1
No. 7 Ole Miss	4	–	0	–	2	8	–	1	–	2
No. 9 Alabama	4	–	2	–	0	10	–	2	–	0
Georgia	4	–	3	–	0	7	–	4	–	0
No. 15 Florida	3	–	3	–	0	8	–	3	–	0
Mississippi State	3	–	4	–	0	5	–	4	–	0
Tulane	3	–	5	–	0	5	–	5	–	0
No. 20 Kentucky	1	–	3	–	2	5	–	4	–	2
LSU	2	–	5	–	0	3	–	7	–	0
Vanderbilt	1	–	4	–	1	3	–	5	–	2
Auburn	0	–	7	–	0	2	–	8	–	0
$ – Conference champion; Rankings from AP Poll

The 1952 Vanderbilt Commodores football team represented Vanderbilt University during the 1952 college football season. The team's head coach was Bill Edwards, who was in his fourth and final year as the Commodores' head coach. Members of the Southeastern Conference, the Commodores played their home games at Dudley Field in Nashville, Tennessee. In 1952, Vanderbilt went 3–5–2 overall with a conference record of 1–4–1.

== Schedule ==
Date	Opponent	Site	Result	Attendance	Source
September 20	Georgia	Dudley Field; Nashville, TN (rivalry)	L 7–19	24,000	
September 27	at Virginia*	Scott Stadium; Charlottesville, VA	L 0–27	22,000	
October 4	at Northwestern*	Dyche Stadium; Evanston, IL	T 20–20	35,000	
October 11	Ole Miss	Dudley Field; Nashville, TN (rivalry)	T 21–21	23,000	
October 18	Florida	Dudley Field; Nashville, TN	W 20–13	20,000	
October 25	at Georgia Tech	Grant Field; Atlanta, GA (rivalry)	L 0–30	35,373	
November 1	Washington and Lee*	Dudley Field; Nashville, TN	W 67–7	16,000	
November 7	at Miami (FL)*	Burdine Stadium; Miami, FL	W 9–0	32,906	
November 15	at Tulane	Tulane Stadium; New Orleans, LA	L 7–16	26,000	
November 29	Tennessee	Dudley Field; Nashville, TN (rivalry)	L 0–46	27,500	
*Non-conference game
