= 1953 Sugar Bowl =

American college football game

- 19th Sugar Bowl
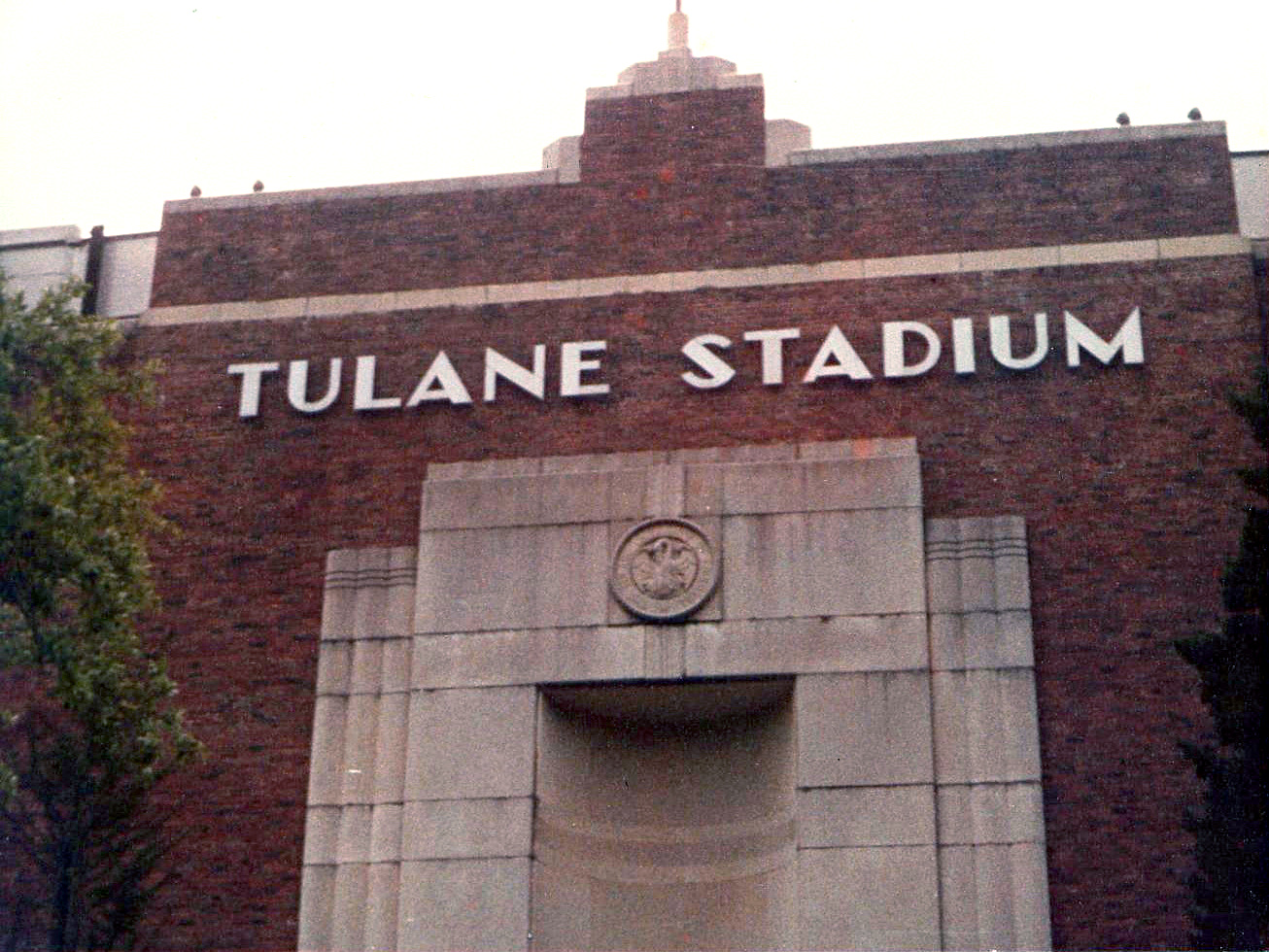
- Tulane Stadium in New Orleans, Louisiana, hosted the Sugar Bowl.
Georgia Tech Yellow Jackets	Ole Miss Rebels
(11–0)	(8–0–2)
SEC	SEC
24	7
Head coach: Bobby Dodd	Head coach: Johnny Vaught
AP / Coaches; 2 / 2	AP / Coaches; 7 / 7
	1	2	3	4	Total
Georgia Tech	0	10	7	7	24
Ole Miss	7	0	0	0	7
- Date: January 1, 1953
- Season: 1952
- Stadium: Tulane Stadium
- Location: New Orleans, Louisiana
- MVP: Leon Hardeman
- Favorite: Georgia Tech by 7
- Referee: Fred Koster (SEC)
- Attendance: 80,187

United States TV coverage
- Network: ABC
- Announcers: Jim Britt and Tom Leavitt

The 1953 Sugar Bowl was an American college football bowl game played on January 1, 1953, at Tulane Stadium in New Orleans. The game featured the second-ranked Georgia Tech Yellow Jackets, and the seventh-ranked Ole Miss Rebels. Georgia Tech won 24–7 to complete their national championship season. Undefeated Michigan State was the top-ranked team in both final polls, released in early December.

This was the first televised Sugar Bowl, carried by ABC.

== Background ==
The Yellow Jackets were champions of the Southeastern Conference (SEC) with a 7–0 conference record and ranked #2 going into the game. Ole Miss finished third in the SEC, but had an undefeated regular season, highlighted by an upset win over Maryland, and were ranked in the top ten for the first time. This was the first bowl game for Ole Miss since 1948 and the program's first Sugar Bowl. This was Georgia Tech's first Sugar Bowl since 1944.

== Game summary ==
Ole Miss scored first on a 4-yard touchdown run by Wilson Dillard, as they took a 7–0 first quarter lead. In the second quarter, Georgia Tech scored on a 1-yard Bill Brigman run to tie the game at 7. Pepper Rodgers kicked a 25-yard field goal as Georgia Tech went up 10–7 at halftime. In the third quarter, Leon Hardeman scored on a 6-yard touchdown run as Georgia Tech went up 17–7. In the fourth quarter, Rodgers threw a 26-yard touchdown pass to Jeff Knox, as Georgia Tech won 24–7. Hardeman went 76 yards on 14 rushes with one touchdown and was named MVP.

== Aftermath ==
Both teams made two more Sugar Bowls appearances in the 1950s. Ole Miss added four more in the 1960s.

== Statistics ==
Statistics	GT	Ole Miss
First downs	16	15
Yards rushing	194	137
Yards passing	101	103
Total yards	295	287
Punts-Average	6-41.8	7-35.4
Fumbles-Lost	5-2	5-3
Interceptions	1	3
Penalties-Yards	5-42	6-60
