= Hootie Ingram =

American football player, coach and administrator (1933–2024)

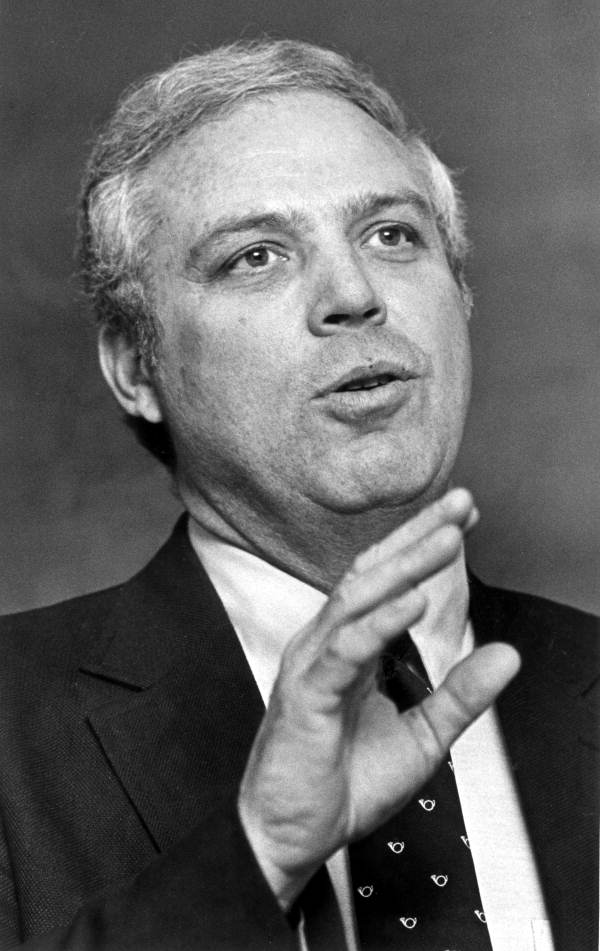
- Ingram in 1989

Biographical details
- Born: September 2, 1933; Tuscaloosa, Alabama, U.S.
- Died: May 6, 2024 (aged 90); Tuscaloosa, Alabama, U.S.

Playing career
- 1952–1954: Alabama
- 1955: Philadelphia Eagles
- Positions: Defensive back, quarterback, halfback

Coaching career (HC unless noted)
- 1956: Manatee HS (FL) (backfield)
- 1957: Brookwood HS (AL)
- 1958–1959: Tuscaloosa County HS (AL)
- 1960: Wake Forest (DB)
- 1961–1963: VPI (DB)
- 1964–1966: Georgia (DB)
- 1967–1969: Arkansas (DB)
- 1970–1972: Clemson

Administrative career (AD unless noted)
- 1981–1989: Florida State
- 1989–1995: Alabama

Head coaching record
- Overall: 12–21 (college)

Accomplishments and honors

Awards
- First-team All-SEC (1952)

Cecil W. "Hootie" Ingram (September 2, 1933 – May 6, 2024) was an American college football player, coach, and athletics administrator. He played for the University of Alabama from 1952 to 1954 and was selected as an All-SEC defensive back in 1952. He worked as an assistant football coach at several colleges, including the University of Georgia and University of Arkansas before he received a head coaching assignment at Clemson University from 1970 to 1972. He was an administrator with the Southeastern Conference in the 1970s and later served as an athletic director at Florida State University (1981–1989) and Alabama (1989–1995).

== Early years ==
Born on Sept. 2, 1933, in Tuscaloosa, Alabama, Ingram was the son of Wayne and Ella Ingram. He attended Tuscaloosa High School, where he received four varsity letters in basketball and three each in football and baseball. In his senior year, he was selected as an All-State halfback, elected to the All-Fifth District basketball team, and played East-West All-Star baseball in Birmingham, Alabama. He graduated from Tuscaloosa High School in 1951.

In 1955, he married Mary Antoinette Snider. They had three children.

== Playing career ==
Ingram enrolled at the University of Alabama in the fall of 1951 where he was a multi-sport star. He won three letters each in football and baseball. He won acclaim as a football player for the Crimson Tide football teams from 1952 to 1954.

As a sophomore in 1952, Ingram was selected as an All-SEC defensive back. In December 1952, the United Press International ran a feature story on Ingram calling him the "Tide's Honorable Thief," due to his talent for intercepting passes. The story gave warning to Alabama's Orange Bowl opponent, "Pre-Orange Bowl warning to Syracuse: beware of Cecil Ingram, an honorable thief. The slender Alabama sophomore safetyman stole more passes thrown by opponents than any other man in the Southeastern Conference this year." His ten interceptions for 162 yards in 1952 (including two returned for touchdowns) tied the Southeastern Conference record for interceptions in a season. He added an eleventh interception in the 1953 Orange Bowl game on January 1, 1953, as Alabama crushed Syracuse 61–6. He also set an Alabama Orange Bowl record with an 80-yard punt return in the 1953 Orange Bowl.

During the 1953 football season, Ingram was moved to the quarterback position on an Alabama team that included future Pro Football Hall of Fame quarterback Bart Starr. He also played at the halfback position in 1953.

As a senior in 1954, Ingram played at the halfback position, with Bart Starr filling the quarterback position for the Crimson Tide. In September 1954, he ran 68 yards for a touchdown against LSU.

In March 1955, Ingram signed a contract to play professional football for the Philadelphia Eagles, though he never played in any regular season games for the Eagles.

== Coaching career ==
Ingram began a coaching career in July 1956 when he was hired as the backfield coach football coach at Manatee High School in Bradenton, Florida. At Manatee, he served on the staff of head coach Wheeler Leeth, who had been Ingram's high school football coach in Tuscaloosa. In June 1957, he returned to Tuscaloosa to serve as a head football coach at Brookwood High School. In February 1958, he was hired as the head football coach and athletic director at Tuscaloosa County High School. After two seasons he was named defensive backs coach for Wake Forest. After one season he took the same position for Virginia Tech. In 1964, he took another defensive backs coach position, this time for Georgia. From 1967 to 1969, he served as a defensive coach under Frank Broyles at the University of Arkansas, earning a reputation as "a defensive genius." In December 1969, he was hired as the head football coach at Clemson University. He served three seasons as Clemson's head coach from 1970 to 1972, compiling a 12–21 record. He resigned as Clemson's head coach in December 1972.

== Athletic director and administrator ==
After resigning his position at Clemson, Ingram spent eight years working on the staff of the Southeastern Conference, first as assistant commissioner for administration as associate commissioner. In January 1981, Ingram was hired as the athletic director at Florida State University. Ingram remained as Florida State's athletic director until September 1989, at which time he returned to his alma mater, signing a five-year contract as the University of Alabama's athletic director. Ingram hired Gene Stallings as Alabama's football coach, and the Crimson Tide won the college football national championship in 1992. Ingram stepped down as Alabama's athletic director in August 1995 after being reprimanded for his role in rules violations that led the NCAA to place the school on probation for three years. Ingram said he could no longer effectively serve as athletic director after the NCAA's rebuke and asked to be reassigned.

== Death ==
Ingram died on May 6, 2024, in a hospital in Birmingham, Alabama, at the age of 90.

== Honors and awards ==
In 1991, Ingram was inducted into the Alabama Sports Hall of Fame. In 1999, he was inducted into the Orange Bowl Hall of Fame. He was also honored in 1992 as a second-team defensive back on Alabama's "Team of the Century." In 2007, the University of Alabama National Alumni Association presented Ingram with the Paul W. Bryant Alumni-Athlete Award. The award recognizes athletes whose accomplishments since leaving the University are "outstanding based on character, contributions to society, professional achievement and service."

== Head coaching record ==
=== College ===
Year	Team	Overall	Conference	Standing	Bowl/playoffs
Clemson Tigers (Atlantic Coast Conference) (1970–1972)
1970	Clemson	3–8	2–4	6th	
1971	Clemson	5–6	4–2	2nd	
1972	Clemson	4–7	2–4	5th	
Clemson:		12–21	8–10		
Total:		12–21			
