= Scarce (band) =

American alternative rock band

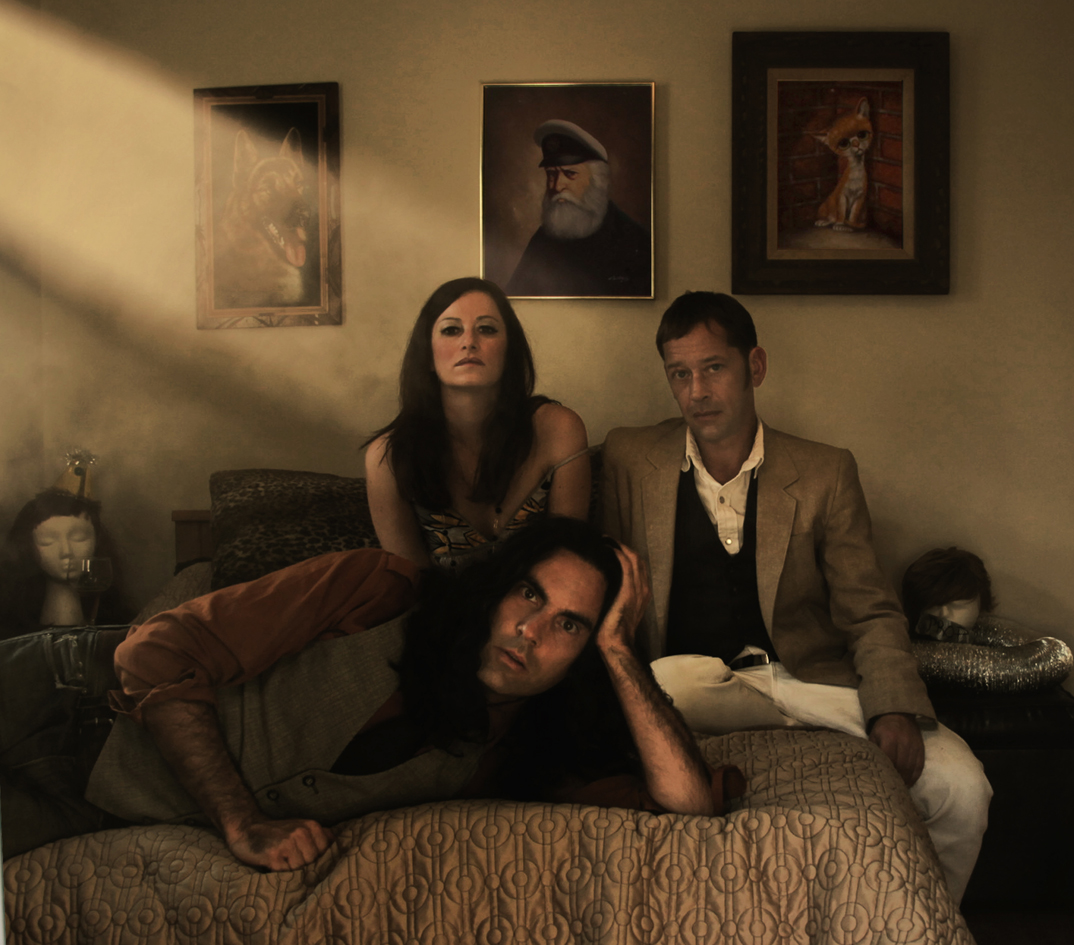

Background information
- Origin: Providence, Rhode Island, United States
- Genres: Alternative rock
- Years active: 1993–1997, 2008–present
- Labels: Delmore, Paradox, A&M, Rockamundo
- Members: Chick Graning; Joyce Raskin; Joseph Propatier
- Past members: Jud Ehrbar; Mike Levesque
- Website: Official website

Scarce is an American alternative rock band formed in Providence, Rhode Island, United States. They were active from 1993 to 1997, and reformed in 2008.

== Biography ==
Chick Graning moved to Providence, Rhode Island after his previous band Anastasia Screamed ended. Scarce was formed with Graning, Joyce Raskin and Jud Ehrbar in 1993. By 1995, Mike Levesque had replaced Ehrbar on drums. The band record and released the UK version of debut album DeadSexy. The band toured with Hole and were growing in popularity. Joseph Propatier replaced Levesque on drums in June. Unfortunately, tragedy struck that month with Graning suffering a brain aneurysm. When he failed to show up for band practice Raskin and Propatier found him unconscious in his flat. Doctors gave Graning a ten percent chance of survival. He managed to pull through but had to relearn how to walk and talk. Soon he had relearned how to sing and play guitar again. The band re-recorded much of their album Deadsexy with Propatier on drums. Also, several new songs were added to the album and some removed. By January 1996, the band had started touring again. In 1997, due to emotional and musical distances growing in the band, Graning and Raskin decided to part ways and the band split up. Looking back they stated that they probably should have had a break after Graning's aneurysm.

=== Post break-up ===
After the band split up Graning started a solo career and also worked as a stage hand. Raskin had suffered a breakdown. Eventually, she wrote an illustrated book about her experiences called "Aching To Be". The book was published in 2007. Before publishing the book Raskin contacted Graning sending him a draft copy. This led to Scarce reforming.

=== Reformation ===
In 2008, they reformed and released an EP entitled Tattoos and Parades and Universal re-released Deadsexy digitally, along with previously unreleased material and pre-A&M demos on iTunes.

Scarce toured the UK in 2008 and 2009. While on the UK tour in 2009, a documentary DVD Release about Scarce premiered by indie filmmaker Sally Irvine titled "Days Like These" before the band played. The DVD is sold on Irvine's website.

In 2010, Joyce Raskin wrote and illustrated a book titled The Fall and Rise of Circus Boy Blue that incorporates Scarce's lyrics into the story. Also in 2010, Graning, Raskin, Propatier along with Matt White provided original music for a children's carol CD. In 2011, recorded versions of the songs in The Fall and Rise of Circus Boy Blue were made available on Bandcamp, forming Scarce's second album.

In 2016, Noble Scars was released on Bandcamp.

In April 2020, Joyce Raskin released Scarce Demos 1993 on Bandcamp.

=== Artwork ===
All of their CD artwork consists of paintings by Raskin.

== Discography ==
=== Albums ===
- DeadSexy CD (1995, Paradox / A&M) - Original UK-only version has different tracks and drums by Levesque. Re-recorded version has drum by Propatier.
- The Fall and Rise of Circus Boy Blue (2011)

=== EPs ===
- Red CD/12" (1994, Tumble Gear Records/Big Cat (UK)) (Collection of singles)
- All Sideways CD/12" (1994, Big Cat)
- Days Like This CD (1996, Paradox) -UK only EP, limited to 1000 pressings.
- Girl Through Me (2008)
- Tattoos and Parades (2008, Number One Fan Records)
- The Red Sessions (2008)
- Noble Scars (Terrible Calico, 2016)

=== Singles ===
- "Days Like This" - 7" b/w Scorpion Tray (1993, Delmore)
- "Hope" - 7" b/w Something (1994, All the Money)
- "All Sideways" - 7" b/w Dozen (1994, RockaMundo)
- "It Was Dry" - 7" (1994, Delmore)
- "Glamourizing Cigarettes" - CD (1995, Paradox)
- "Freakshadow" - CD (1995, A&M/Paradox (UK))

=== Related projects ===
- M.T. (2001, Wald & Wiesen Tonträger) CD by Graning
- Curious George Christmas Carols Book and CD (2010, Houghton Mifflin Harcourt Publishing Company) - music by Graning, Raskin, Propatier, White ISBN 9780547408613
- Aching to Be (2007, Number One Fan Press) Raskin ISBN 9780615172217

== Members ==
- Chick Graning - vocals, guitar
- Joyce Raskin - bass, vocals
- Joe Propatier - drums
