= 1952 Tennessee Volunteers football team =

American college football season

1952 Tennessee Volunteers football

Cotton Bowl Classic, L 0–16 vs. Texas
- Conference: Southeastern Conference

Ranking
- Coaches: No. 8
- AP: No. 8
- Record: 8–2–1 (5–0–1 SEC)
- Head coach: Robert Neyland (21st season)
- Home stadium: Shields–Watkins Field

1952 Southeastern Conference football standings
	Conf.					Overall
Team	W		L		T	W		L		T
No. 2 Georgia Tech $	7	–	0	–	0	12	–	0	–	0
No. 8 Tennessee	5	–	0	–	1	8	–	2	–	1
No. 7 Ole Miss	4	–	0	–	2	8	–	1	–	2
No. 9 Alabama	4	–	2	–	0	10	–	2	–	0
Georgia	4	–	3	–	0	7	–	4	–	0
No. 15 Florida	3	–	3	–	0	8	–	3	–	0
Mississippi State	3	–	4	–	0	5	–	4	–	0
Tulane	3	–	5	–	0	5	–	5	–	0
No. 20 Kentucky	1	–	3	–	2	5	–	4	–	2
LSU	2	–	5	–	0	3	–	7	–	0
Vanderbilt	1	–	4	–	1	3	–	5	–	2
Auburn	0	–	7	–	0	2	–	8	–	0
$ – Conference champion; Rankings from AP Poll

The 1952 Tennessee Volunteers (variously Tennessee, UT, or the Vols) represented the University of Tennessee in the 1952 college football season. Playing as a member of the Southeastern Conference (SEC), the team was led by head coach Robert Neyland, in his 21st and final year, and played their home games at Shields–Watkins Field in Knoxville, Tennessee. They finished the season with a record of eight wins, two losses and one tie (8–2–1 overall, 5–0–1 in the SEC). They concluded the season with a loss against Texas in the Cotton Bowl Classic.

== Schedule ==
Date	Opponent	Rank	Site	TV	Result	Attendance	Source
September 27	vs. Mississippi State	No. 6	Crump Stadium; Memphis, TN		W 14–7	20,376	
October 4	at No. 10 Duke*	No. 11	Duke Stadium; Durham, NC		L 0–7	35,000	
October 11	Chattanooga*		Shields–Watkins Field; Knoxville, TN		W 26–6	20,000	
October 18	No. 18 Alabama		Shields–Watkins Field; Knoxville, TN (Third Saturday in October)		W 20–0	55,000	
October 25	Wofford*	No. 13	Shields–Watkins Field; Knoxville, TN		W 50–0	15,000	
November 1	North Carolina*	No. 12	Shields–Watkins Field; Knoxville, TN		W 41–14	22,000	
November 8	at LSU	No. 8	Tiger Stadium; Baton Rouge, LA		W 22–3	35,000	
November 15	No. 18 Florida^{†}	No. 7	Shields–Watkins Field; Knoxville, TN (rivalry)		W 26–12	35,000	
November 22	Kentucky	No. 7	Shields–Watkins Field; Knoxville, TN (rivalry)		T 14–14	30,000	
November 29	at Vanderbilt	No. 9	Dudley Field; Nashville, TN (rivalry)		W 46–0	27,500	
January 1	vs. No. 10 Texas*	No. 8	Cotton Bowl; Dallas, TX (Cotton Bowl Classic)	NBC	L 0–16	75,500	
*Non-conference game; ^{†}Homecoming; Rankings from AP Poll released prior to the game

== Team players drafted into the NFL ==
Player	Position	Round	Pick	NFL club
Doug Atkins	Tackle	1	11	Cleveland Browns
Frank Holohan	Tackle	10	114	Pittsburgh Steelers
Jim Haslam	Tackle	24	283	Green Bay Packers
Ed Morgan	Back	24	284	San Francisco 49ers
John Michels	Guard	25	297	Philadelphia Eagles
Pat Shires	Back	29	339	Washington Redskins
Andy Myers	Guard	30	358	Cleveland Browns
