= Anastasia Screamed =

American alternative rock band

- Origin: Boston, Massachusetts, USA
- Genres: Alternative rock
- Years active: 1987–1992
- Label: Roughneck
- Past members: Chris Burdett; Christopher Cugini; Scott Lerner; Andy Jagolinzer; Chick Graning; Stuart Abelson; Michael Lord; Charlie Bock

Anastasia Screamed was an American alternative rock band formed in Boston, Massachusetts in 1987. The band split up in 1992 after releasing two albums, with singer Chick Graning forming Scarce.

== History ==
The band was formed in 1987 by drummer Chris Burdett and guitarist Christopher Cugini, the band initially completed by bassist Scott Lerner and singer Andy Jagolinzer. After a debut single in 1987, Jagolinzer was replaced by Knoxville singer Chick Graning. By 1990, the band had relocated to Nashville, and Lerner had left, with Nashville native Charlie Bock becoming his permanent replacement. Airplay on college radio in the US and on national radio in the UK, and tours with Throwing Muses raised the band's profile and they signed to Fire Records subsidiary Roughneck in the UK, the first single for the label being "Samantha Black" in August 1990, with the band's debut album, Laughing Down the Limehouse released a month later. The album was described in a review in Select as a cross between Dinosaur Jr.'s first album and bands such as The Long Ryders and Let's Active. A second album, Moontime, followed in 1991, but was the band's final release; They split up in 1992 with Graning forming Scarce.

== Discography ==
=== Albums ===
- Laughing Down the Limehouse (1990), Fire/Roughneck
- Moontime (1991), Roughneck

=== Singles, EPs ===
- "What Kind of Truth Is This?" (1987), Burning Rock Ducks Sounds
- "Electric Liz" (1988), Killing Floor
- "Samantha Black" (1990), Roughneck
- 15 Seconds or 5 Days EP (1991), Roughneck/Fire
- Tornado EP (1991), Roughneck

=== Compilation appearances ===
- Pipeline! (1996), Slow River: "Marquee Moon" (live)
