= 1952 Georgia Tech Yellow Jackets football team =

American college football season

1952 Georgia Tech Yellow Jackets football

National champion (INS, Houlgate, Poling, Berryman, Billingsley, Sagarin) SEC champion Sugar Bowl champion

Sugar Bowl, W 24–7 vs. Ole Miss
- Conference: Southeastern Conference

Ranking
- Coaches: No. 2
- AP: No. 2
- Record: 12–0 (7–0 SEC)
- Head coach: Bobby Dodd (8th season)
- Offensive coordinator: Frank Broyles
- Offensive scheme: Split-T
- Defensive coordinator: Ray Graves
- Captains: George Morris; Hal Miller
- Home stadium: Grant Field

1952 Southeastern Conference football standings
	Conf.					Overall
Team	W		L		T	W		L		T
No. 2 Georgia Tech $	7	–	0	–	0	12	–	0	–	0
No. 8 Tennessee	5	–	0	–	1	8	–	2	–	1
No. 7 Ole Miss	4	–	0	–	2	8	–	1	–	2
No. 9 Alabama	4	–	2	–	0	10	–	2	–	0
Georgia	4	–	3	–	0	7	–	4	–	0
No. 15 Florida	3	–	3	–	0	8	–	3	–	0
Mississippi State	3	–	4	–	0	5	–	4	–	0
Tulane	3	–	5	–	0	5	–	5	–	0
No. 20 Kentucky	1	–	3	–	2	5	–	4	–	2
LSU	2	–	5	–	0	3	–	7	–	0
Vanderbilt	1	–	4	–	1	3	–	5	–	2
Auburn	0	–	7	–	0	2	–	8	–	0
$ – Conference champion; Rankings from AP Poll

The 1952 Georgia Tech Yellow Jackets football team represented the Georgia Institute of Technology in the 1952 NCAA football season. Led by head coach Bobby Dodd, the Yellow Jackets went undefeated including a victory in the 1953 Sugar Bowl. Coach Bobby Dodd and the Yellow Jackets were awarded a split National Championship, winning the 1952 INS National Championship poll, sharing the Championship with the Michigan State Spartans. The team was selected national champion by Berryman, Billingsley, INS, Poling, and Sagarin (ELO-Chess).

== Schedule ==
Date	Opponent	Rank	Site	TV	Result	Attendance	Source
September 20	The Citadel*	No. 3	Grant Field; Atlanta, GA		W 54–6	22,000	
September 27	Florida	No. 3	Grant Field; Atlanta, GA		W 17–14	30,939	
October 4	at SMU*	No. 6	Cotton Bowl; Dallas, TX		W 20–7	41,000	
October 11	Tulane	No. 5	Grant Field; Atlanta, GA		W 14–0	27,913	
October 18	Auburn	No. 4	Grant Field; Atlanta, GA (rivalry)		W 33–0	34,689	
October 25	Vanderbilt^{†}	No. 5	Grant Field; Atlanta, GA (rivalry)		W 30–0	35,373	
November 1	at No. 6 Duke*	No. 4	Duke Stadium; Durham, NC		W 28–7	45,000	
November 8	Army*	No. 3	Grant Field; Atlanta, GA		W 45–6	40,000	
November 15	No. 12 Alabama	No. 2	Grant Field; Atlanta, GA (rivalry)	NBC	W 7–3	38,063	
November 22	Florida State*	No. 2	Grant Field; Atlanta, GA		W 30–0	25,000	
November 29	at Georgia	No. 3	Sanford Stadium; Athens, GA (rivalry)		W 23–9	50,000	
January 1, 1953	vs. No. 7 Ole Miss*	No. 2	Tulane Stadium; New Orleans, LA (Sugar Bowl)	ABC	W 24–7	80,187	
*Non-conference game; ^{†}Homecoming; Rankings from AP Poll released prior to the game; Source:

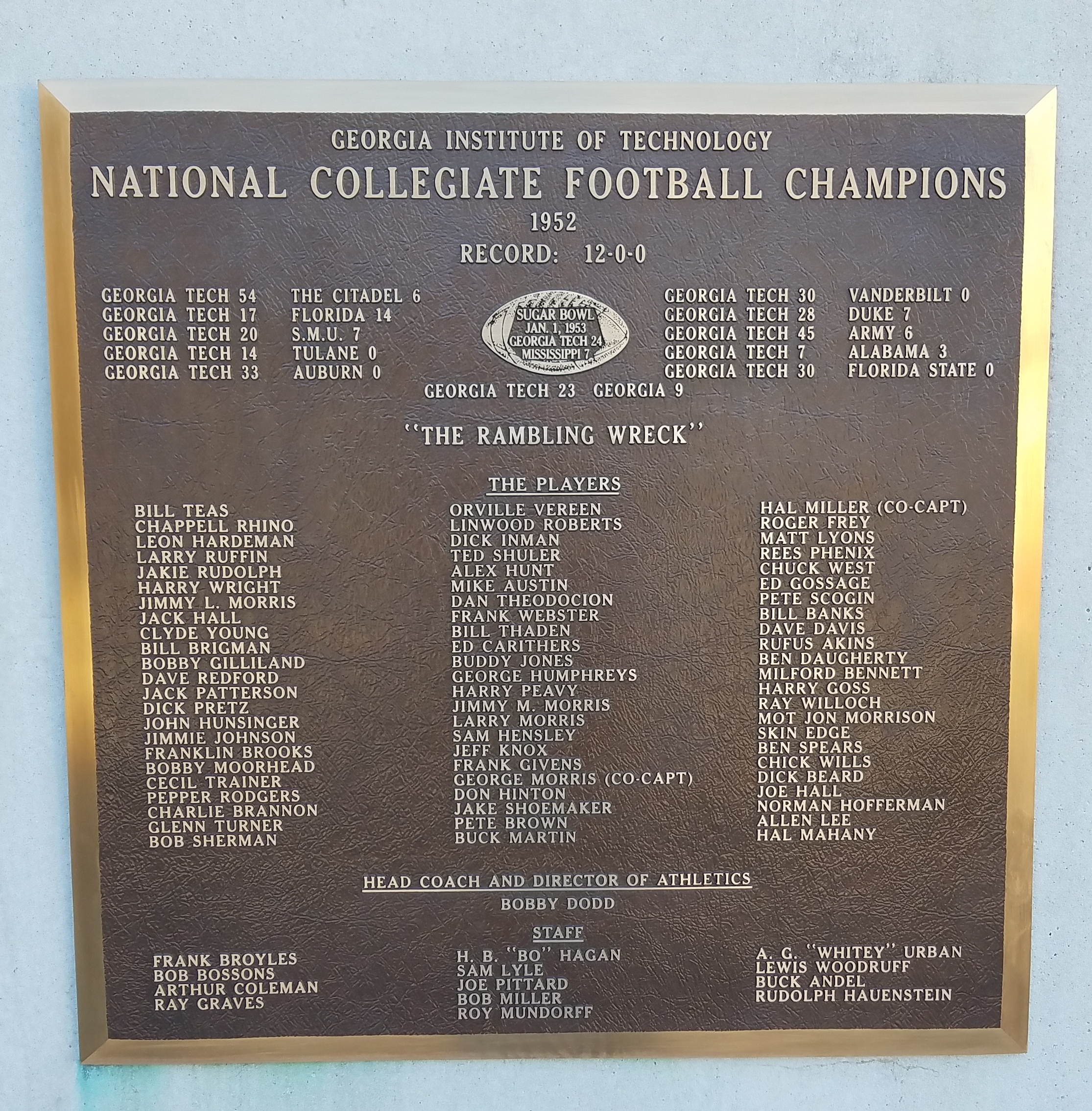
Plaque at Georgia Tech honoring their National Championship season

== Team players drafted into the NFL ==
Player	Position	Round	Pick	NFL club
George Morris	Center	2	21	San Francisco 49ers
Gerdes (Buck) Martin	End	4	39	Chicago Cardinals
Hal Miller	Tackle	5	57	San Francisco 49ers
Pete Brown	Center	10	118	San Francisco 49ers
Bobby Moorhead	Back	13	146	Baltimore Colts
Jeff Knox	End	23	272	Philadelphia Eagles

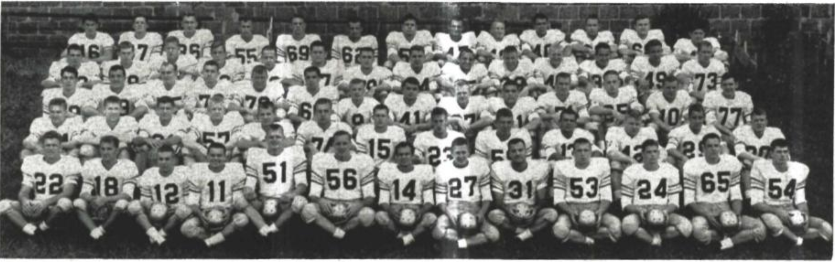
1952 Yellow Jacket Team
