= Bobby Luna =

American football player (1933–2008)

No. 49, 24, 23
- Positions: Safety, punter

Personal information
- Born: March 25, 1933; Lewisburg, Tennessee, U.S.
- Died: March 14, 2008 (aged 74); Franklin, Tennessee, U.S.
- Listed height: 5 ft 11 in (1.80 m)
- Listed weight: 187 lb (85 kg)

Career information
- High school: Huntsville (Huntsville, Alabama)
- College: Alabama
- NFL draft: 1955: 6th round, 69th overall pick

Career history
- San Francisco 49ers (1955); BC Lions (1958)*; Pittsburgh Steelers (1959); Dallas Cowboys (1960)*; Tuscaloosa Warriors (1963)
- * Offseason or practice squad member only

Career NFL statistics
- Punts: 126
- Punting yards: 5,121
- Longest punt: 63
- Interceptions: 5
- Stats at Pro Football Reference

Robert Kendall Luna (March 25, 1933 – March 14, 2008) was an American professional football player who was a safety in the National Football League (NFL) for the San Francisco 49ers and Pittsburgh Steelers. He played college football for the Alabama Crimson Tide.

== Early life ==
Luna attended Huntsville High School, where he was a multi-sport athlete. As a junior in football, he was named honorable-mention Class A All-state.

As a senior, he recorded 1,159 total yards (rushing and passing) for a weak Huntsville team. He averaged 7.7 yards per carry, while scoring 108 points on 13 touchdowns and 30 of 34 extra points. He punted 32 times for a 39-yard average. At the end of the season, he received National High School All-American, Class 2A All-state, All-TVC and All-Southern honors.

He received All-TVC honors in basketball as a senior. He also practiced baseball.

== College career ==
Luna accepted a football scholarship from the University of Alabama. In his first season, 1951, the Southeastern Conference allowed freshmen to play varsity football, so he was able to post 10 carries for 76 yards (7.6-yard avg.), 2 rushing touchdowns, 4 receptions for 86 yards and one receiving touchdown.

As a sophomore, he became a starter in a backfield that also included future pro football hall of famer Bart Starr. He was third on the team with 100 carries for 342 yards (3.4-yard avg.) and 6 touchdowns (2 against LSU). He also was the team's placekicker.

As a junior in 1953, he was second on the team with 80 carries for 309 yards (3.9-yard avg.) and 2 touchdowns. He is probably best remembered for connecting on a fourth quarter field goal from 28-yards, helping his team beat Auburn University 10–7 in the Iron Bowl. The victory improved Alabama's all-time record against Auburn to 9–8–1. Luna set the Alabama single-season scoring record in 1953, scoring 72 points.

During his 1954 senior season, he was third on the team with 75 carries for 310 yards (4.1-yard avg.), while handling punting duties. He finished his college career with 265 carries for 1,037 yards (3.9-yard avg.), 9 rushing touchdowns, 34 receptions for 570 yards (16.8-yard avg.) and 5 receiving touchdowns. He also practiced baseball during his 4 years in college.

In 2006, he was inducted into the University of Alabama Athletics Hall of Fame.

== Professional career ==
=== San Francisco 49ers ===
Luna was selected by the San Francisco 49ers in the sixth round (69th overall) of the 1955 NFL draft. He was converted into a defensive back during training camp. He started in 12 games as a safety and punter. He tallied 2 interceptions, 63 punts for 2,558 yards (40.6-yard avg.) and had 3 punts blocked.

From 1956 to 1957 he served in the United States Army. He also was a player-coach for the Fort Hood football team for two seasons.

On January 23, 1958, he signed with the BC Lions of the Canadian Football League. He returned home before the start of the season, after his baby was born and required to have a surgery.

On September 15, 1959, he was traded to the Pittsburgh Steelers in exchange for a future draft choice.

=== Pittsburgh Steelers ===
In 1959, he returned to the National Football League after being an assistant football coach at the University of Alabama the previous year. He started in 11 games as a safety and punter. He registered 3 interceptions and 63 punts for 2,563 yards (40.7-yard avg.).

=== Dallas Cowboys ===
In 1960, Luna was selected by the Dallas Cowboys in the expansion draft. He was released before the start of the season.

=== Tuscaloosa Warriors (SPFL) ===
In 1963, he signed with the Tuscaloosa Warriors of the Southern Professional Football League, who were under the ownership of Eddie Brightwell, with both Luna and Bobby Jackson serving as player-coaches. The team finished with an 8–7 record. In 1964, it was relocated to Columbus, Mississippi and was renamed as the Columbus Warriors.

== Personal life ==
On June 21, 1958, he was hired as an assistant football coach under Paul "Bear" Bryant. In 2006, he received the Paul "Bear" Bryant Award from the University of Alabama. He was the owner of Luna Construction, LLC.

Luna died on March 14, 2008, at age 74 in Franklin, Tennessee.
