= 1952 Georgia Bulldogs football team =

American college football season

1952 Georgia Bulldogs football
- Conference: Southeastern Conference
- Record: 7–4 (4–3 SEC)
- Head coach: Wally Butts (14th season)
- Home stadium: Sanford Stadium

1952 Southeastern Conference football standings
	Conf.					Overall
Team	W		L		T	W		L		T
No. 2 Georgia Tech $	7	–	0	–	0	12	–	0	–	0
No. 8 Tennessee	5	–	0	–	1	8	–	2	–	1
No. 7 Ole Miss	4	–	0	–	2	8	–	1	–	2
No. 9 Alabama	4	–	2	–	0	10	–	2	–	0
Georgia	4	–	3	–	0	7	–	4	–	0
No. 15 Florida	3	–	3	–	0	8	–	3	–	0
Mississippi State	3	–	4	–	0	5	–	4	–	0
Tulane	3	–	5	–	0	5	–	5	–	0
No. 20 Kentucky	1	–	3	–	2	5	–	4	–	2
LSU	2	–	5	–	0	3	–	7	–	0
Vanderbilt	1	–	4	–	1	3	–	5	–	2
Auburn	0	–	7	–	0	2	–	8	–	0
$ – Conference champion; Rankings from AP Poll

The 1952 Georgia Bulldogs football team was an American football team that represented the University of Georgia as a member of the Southeastern Conference (SEC) during the 1952 college football season. In their 14th year under head coach Wally Butts, the Bulldogs compiled an overall record of 7–4, with a conference record of 4–3, and finished fifth in the SEC.

== Schedule ==
Date	Opponent	Rank	Site	Result	Attendance	Source
September 20	at Vanderbilt		Dudley Field; Nashville, TN (rivalry)	W 19–7	24,000	
September 27	at Tulane		Tulane Stadium; New Orleans, LA	W 21–16	40,000	
October 4	NC State*		Sanford Stadium; Athens, GA	W 49–0	22,000	
October 11	No. 4 Maryland*	No. 19	Sanford Stadium; Athens, GA	L 0–37	34,000	
October 18	at LSU		Tiger Stadium; Baton Rouge, LA	W 27–14	37,000	
October 25	vs. Florida		Gator Bowl Stadium; Jacksonville, FL (rivalry)	L 0–30	37,000	
November 1	at No. 19 Alabama		Legion Field; Birmingham, AL (rivalry)	L 19–34	30,000	
November 8	at Penn*		Franklin Field; Philadelphia, PA	W 34–27	45,000	
November 15	vs. Auburn		Memorial Stadium; Columbus, GA (rivalry)	W 13–7	23,000	
November 29	No. 3 Georgia Tech^{†}		Sanford Stadium; Athens, GA (rivalry)	L 9–23	50,000	
December 5	at Miami (FL)*		Burdine Stadium; Miami, FL	W 35–13	21,557	
*Non-conference game; ^{†}Homecoming; Rankings from AP Poll released prior to the game

== Roster ==
- RB Robert (Bobby) Dellinger
- DE Robert K. West (#52, Captain)
- LE Johnny Carson
- Art DeCarlo
- LT Bobby Anglin
- LG Joe Scichilone
- C Derwent Langley
- C Hurley Jones
- RG Bruce Wimberly
- RT Vernon Griffith
- RE Harry Babcock
- QB Zeke Bratkowski
- LH Conrad Manisera
- RH Charlie Madison
- RH Jack Roberts
- FB Bob Clemens
- FB Fred Bilyeu
