= List of Tulsa Golden Hurricane football seasons =

The following is the list of Tulsa Golden Hurricane football seasons by Tulsa Golden Hurricane football program.

== Seasons ==
Conference champions *	Division champions ‡	Bowl game berth ^	Not applicable

Season	Head coach(es)	Division	Regular season results							Championship and postseason results	Final ranking	
Season	Head coach(es)	Division	Conference				Overall			Championship and postseason results	AP	Coaches'
Season	Head coach(es)	Division	Finish^{1}	Win(s)	Tie(s)^{2}	Loss(es)	Win(s)	Tie(s)^{2}	Loss(es)	Championship and postseason results	AP	Coaches'
Kendall Orange and Black/Kendallites/Presbyterians/Tulsans/Tigers/Yellow Jackets (1895–1922)
Tulsa Golden Hurricane (1922–present)
Independent (1895–1913)
1895	Norman Leard						1	0	0			
1896	Norman Leard						2	0	1			
1897	Norman Leard						2	0	1			
1898	Fred Taylor						1	0	0			
1899	Fred Taylor						0	1	1			
1900	Unknown						2	0	1			
1901	Unknown						0	0	1			
1902	Unknown						0	0	1			
1905	Unknown						1	0	3			
1908	Sam P. McBirney						2	0	3			
1909	Unknown						2	0	1			
1910	Unknown						2	1	1			
1912	Harvey Allen						1	0	4			
1913	George "Red" Evans						5	0	2			
Oklahoma Collegiate Conference (1914–1928)
1914	Sam P. McBirney		3rd	3	0	2	6	0	2			
1915	Sam P. McBirney		2nd	4	1	1	6	1	1			
1916 *	Sam P. McBirney		1st	4	0	0	10	0	0			
1917	Hal Mefford	Did not compete					0	1	8			
1918	Arthur F. Smith	Did not compete					1	0	2			
1919 *	Francis Schmidt		1st	5	1	0	8	1	0			
1920 *	Francis Schmidt		1st	6	1	0	10	1	0			
1921	Francis Schmidt		2nd	5	0	1	6	0	3			
1922 *	Howard Acher		1st	4	0	0	8	0	0			
1923	Howard Acher	Did not compete					2	1	5			
1924	Howard Acher	Did not compete					1	1	6			
1925 *	Gus Henderson		1st	4	0	0	6	0	2			
1926	Gus Henderson		2nd	5	0	1	7	0	2			
1927	Gus Henderson		T–3rd	3	0	1	8	0	1			
1928	Gus Henderson		2nd	7	1	2	3	1	1			
Big Four Conference (1929–1932)
1929 *	Gus Henderson		1st	4	1	0	6	1	3			
1930 *	Gus Henderson		1st	3	0	0	7	0	2			
1931	Gus Henderson		2nd	8	0	3	2	0	1			
1932 *	Gus Henderson		1st	3	0	0	7	1	1			
Independent (1933–1934)
1933	Gus Henderson						6	0	1			
1934	Gus Henderson						5	1	2			
Missouri Valley Conference (1935–1985)
1935 *	Gus Henderson		T–1st	3	0	0	3	1	6			
1936 *	Vic Hurt		T–1st	3	0	0	5	2	2			
1937 *	Vic Hurt		1st	3	0	0	6	2	2			
1938 *	Vic Hurt		1st	3	0	1	4	1	5			
1939	Chet Benefiel		3rd	2	1	1	4	1	5			
1940 *	Chet Benefiel		1st	4	0	0	7	0	3			
1941 *	Henry Frnka		1st	5	0	0	8	0	2	Won Sun Bowl against Texas Tech, 6–0 ^		
1942 *	Henry Frnka		1st	5	0	0	10	0	1	Lost Sugar Bowl against Tennessee, 7–14 ^	4	
1943 *	Henry Frnka		1st	1	0	0	6	1	1	Lost Sugar Bowl against Georgia Tech, 18–20 ^	15	
1944	Henry Frnka		2nd	0	0	1	8	0	2	Won Orange Bowl against Georgia Tech, 18–20 ^		
1945	Henry Frnka		2nd	2	0	1	8	0	3	Lost Oil Bowl against Georgia, 6–20 ^	17	
1946 *	Buddy Brothers		1st	3	0	0	9	0	1		17	
1947 *	Buddy Brothers		1st	3	0	0	5	0	5			
1948	Buddy Brothers		4th	0	1	1	0	1	9			
1949	Buddy Brothers		4th	1	1	2	5	1	5			
1950 *	Buddy Brothers		1st	3	1	0	9	1	1		18	
1951 *	Buddy Brothers		1st	4	0	0	9	0	2			
1952	Buddy Brothers		2nd	3	0	1	8	1	2	Lost Gator Bowl against Florida, 13–14 ^	12	
1953	Bernie Witucki		5th	1	0	3	3	0	7			
1954	Bernie Witucki		5th	0	0	4	0	0	11			
1955	Bobby Dobbs		T–4th	1	0	3	2	1	7			
1956	Bobby Dobbs		T–2nd	2	1	1	7	1	2			
1957	Bobby Dobbs		3rd	2	0	2	4	0	6			
1958	Bobby Dobbs		T–2nd	2	0	2	7	0	3			
1959	Bobby Dobbs		3rd	2	0	2	5	0	5			
1960	Bobby Dobbs		2nd	2	0	1	5	0	5			
1961	Glenn Dobbs		T–2nd	1	0	2	2	0	8			
1962 *	Glenn Dobbs		1st	3	0	0	5	0	5			
1963	Glenn Dobbs		T–3rd	2	0	2	5	0	5			
1964	Glenn Dobbs		2nd	2	0	2	5	0	5	Won Bluebonnet Bowl against Ole Miss, 14–7 ^		18
1965 *	Glenn Dobbs		1st	4	0	0	8	0	3	Lost Bluebonnet Bowl against Tennessee, 6–27 ^		16
1966 *	Glenn Dobbs		T–1st	3	0	1	6	0	4			
1967	Glenn Dobbs		2nd	3	0	1	7	0	3			
1968	Glenn Dobbs		T–4th	2	0	3	3	0	7			
1969	Vince Carillot		6th	1	0	4	1	0	9			
1970	Claude Gibson		2nd	3	0	1	6	0	4			
1971	Claude Gibson		4th	2	0	1	4	0	7			
1972	Claude Gibson, F. A. Dry		4th	3	0	1	4	0	7			
1973 *	F. A. Dry		T–1st	5	0	1	6	0	5			
1974 *	F. A. Dry		1st	6	0	0	8	0	3			19
1975 *	F. A. Dry		1st	4	0	0	7	0	4			
1976 *	F. A. Dry		T–1st	2	1	1	7	1	4	Lost Independence Bowl against McNeese, 16–20 ^		
1977	John Cooper		4th	2	0	3	3	0	8			
1978	John Cooper		2nd	3	0	1	9	0	2			
1979	John Cooper		Did not compete for league title				5	0	5			
1980 *	John Cooper		1st	4	0	1	8	0	3			
1981 *	John Cooper		T–1st	5	0	1	6	0	5			
1982 *	John Cooper		1st	6	0	0	10	0	1			
1983 *	John Cooper		1st	5	0	0	8	0	3			
1984 *	John Cooper		1st	5	0	0	6	0	5			
1985 *	Don Morton		1st	3	0	0	6	0	5			
Independent (1986–1995)
1986	Don Morton						7	0	4			
1987	George Henshaw						3	0	8			
1988	David Rader						4	0	7			
1989	David Rader						6	0	6	Lost Independence Bowl against Oregon, 24–27 ^		
1990	David Rader						3	0	8			
1991	David Rader						10	0	2	Won Freedom Bowl against San Diego State, 28–17 ^	21	21
1992	David Rader						4	0	7			
1993	David Rader						4	1	6			
1994	David Rader						3	0	8			
1995	David Rader						4	0	7			
Western Athletic Conference (1996–2004)
1996	David Rader	Mountain	6th	2		6	4		7			
1997	David Rader	Mountain	7th	2		6	2		9			
1998	David Rader	Mountain	6th	2		6	4		7			
1999	David Rader, Pat Henderson		8th	1		6	2		9			
2000	Keith Burns		5th	4		4	5		7			
2001	Keith Burns		10th	0		8	1		10			
2002	Keith Burns		T–9th	1		7	1		11			
2003	Steve Kragthorpe		T–3rd	6		2	8		5			
2004	Steve Kragthorpe		T–6th	3		5	4		8			
Conference USA (2005–2013)
2005 *	Steve Kragthorpe	West	1st	6		2	9		4	Won Liberty Bowl against Fresno State, 31–24 ^		
2006	Steve Kragthorpe	West	3rd	5		3	8		5	Lost Armed Forces Bowl against Utah, 13–25 ^		
2007 ‡	Todd Graham	West	1st	6		2	10		4	Won GMAC Bowl against Bowling Green, 63–7 ^		
2008 ‡	Todd Graham	West	T–1st	7		1	11		3	Won GMAC Bowl against Ball State, 45–24 ^		
2009	Todd Graham	West	3rd	3		5	5		7			
2010 ‡	Todd Graham	West	T–1st	6		2	10		3	Won Hawaii Bowl against Hawaii, 62–35 ^	24	
2011	Bill Blankenship	West	2nd	7		1	8		5	Lost Armed Forces Bowl against BYU, 21–24 ^		
2012 *	Bill Blankenship	West	1st	7		1	11		3	Won Liberty Bowl against Iowa State, 31–17 ^		25
2013	Bill Blankenship	West	6th	2		6	3		9			
American Athletic Conference (2014–present)
2014	Bill Blankenship		T–8th	2		6	2		10			
2015	Philip Montgomery	West	4th	3		5	6		7	Lost Independence Bowl against Virginia Tech, 52–55 ^		
2016	Philip Montgomery	West	2nd	6		2	10		3	Won Miami Beach Bowl against Central Michigan, 55–10 ^		
2017	Philip Montgomery	West	6th	1		7	2		10			
2018	Philip Montgomery	West	T–5th	2		6	3		9			
2019	Philip Montgomery	West	T–5th	2		6	4		8			
2020	Philip Montgomery		T–1st	6		0	6		3	Lost Armed Forces Bowl against Mississippi State, 26–28 ^		
2021	Philip Montgomery		T–3rd	5		3	7		6	Won Myrtle Beach Bowl against Old Dominion, 30–17 ^		
2022	Philip Montgomery		T–8th	3		5	5		7			
2023	Kevin Wilson		T–11th	2		6	4		8			
2024	Kevin Wilson / Ryan Switzer		T–13th	1		7	3		9			
2025	Tre Lamb		13	1		7	4		8			

^{1} When in a division, it shows their position within the division otherwise the overall position in the division-less conference.
^{2} Overtime rules in college football were introduced in 1996, making ties impossible in the period since.
