= 1922 Phillips Haymakers football team =

American college football season

1922 Phillips Haymakers football

OIC co-champion
- Conference: Oklahoma Intercollegiate Conference
- Record: 7–1 (5–0 OIC)
- Head coach: Mont McIntire (2nd season)
- Captain: Joe Milam
- Home stadium: Alton Field

1922 Oklahoma Intercollegiate Conference football standings
	Conf.					Overall
Team	W		L		T	W		L		T
Phillips +	5	–	0	–	0	7	–	1	–	0
Tulsa +	4	–	0	–	0	8	–	0	–	0
Southeastern Oklahoma State +	3	–	1	–	0	7	–	1	–	1
Oklahoma A&M	2	–	0	–	0	4	–	4	–	1
Central State Teachers	5	–	3	–	0	7	–	4	–	0
Southwestern State	4	–	3	–	0	5	–	4	–	0
East Central	2	–	3	–	0	5	–	3	–	1
Northwestern Oklahoma State	1	–	4	–	1	3	–	4	–	1
Oklahoma Baptist	1	–	6	–	1	2	–	7	–	1
Oklahoma City	0	–	7	–	0	0	–	9	–	0
$ – Conference champion

The 1922 Phillips Haymakers football team was an American football team represented Phillips University as a member of the Oklahoma Intercollegiate Conference during the 1922 college football season. Led by second-year head coach Mont McIntire, the Haymakers compiled an overall record of 7–1 with a mark of 5–0 in conference play, sharing the OIC title with Tulsa and Southeastern Oklahoma State. The team's captain was Joe Milam.

== Schedule ==
Date	Opponent	Site	Result	Attendance	Source
September 23	Southwestern (KS)*	Alton Field; Enid, OK	W 13–7		
October 7	at Texas*	Clark Field; Austin, TX	L 10–41		
October 14	Southwestern State	Alton Field; Enid, OK	W 34–13		
October 21	Baylor*	Alton Field; Enid, OK	W 47–0	2,000	
October 27	at Northwestern State (OK)	Alva, OK	W 39–0		
November 3	Oklahoma City	Alton Field; Enid, OK	W 120–0		
November 11	Central State Teachers^{†}	Alton Field; Enid, OK	W 31–7		
November 18	Oklahoma Baptist	Alton Field; Enid, OK	W 109–6		
*Non-conference game; ^{†}Homecoming
