= 1926 Tulsa Golden Hurricane football team =

American college football season

1926 Tulsa Golden Hurricane football
- Conference: Oklahoma Intercollegiate Conference
- Record: 7–2 (5–1 OIC)
- Head coach: Gus Henderson (2nd season)
- Home stadium: McNulty Park

1926 Oklahoma Intercollegiate Conference football standings
| | Conf. | | | | | Overall |
| Team | W | | L | | T | W | | L | | T |
|---|---|---|---|---|---|---|---|---|---|---|
| Southwestern State $ | 5 | – | 0 | – | 0 | 7 | – | 2 | – | 0 |
| Tulsa | 5 | – | 1 | – | 0 | 7 | – | 2 | – | 0 |
| Oklahoma Baptist | 4 | – | 1 | – | 1 | 6 | – | 1 | – | 1 |
| Northeastern State | 3 | – | 3 | – | 0 | 4 | – | 5 | – | 0 |
| Southeastern Oklahoma State | 3 | – | 3 | – | 0 | 4 | – | 5 | – | 0 |
| Central State Teachers | 2 | – | 2 | – | 2 | 3 | – | 3 | – | 3 |
| Oklahoma City | 3 | – | 4 | – | 1 | 5 | – | 4 | – | 1 |
| Phillips | 2 | – | 3 | – | 1 | 2 | – | 5 | – | 1 |
| Northwestern Oklahoma State | 0 | – | 5 | – | 1 | 2 | – | 5 | – | 2 |
| East Central | 0 | – | 5 | – | 0 | 2 | – | 7 | – | 0 |
$ – Conference champion

The 1926 Tulsa Golden Hurricane football team represented the University of Tulsa during the 1926 college football season. In their second year under head coach Gus Henderson, the Golden Hurricane compiled a 7–2 record and outscored their opponents by a total of 169 to 56.

== Schedule ==
| Date | Opponent | Site | Result | Attendance | Source |
|---|---|---|---|---|---|
| September 25 | Southeastern Oklahoma State | McNulty Park; Tulsa, OK | W 33–10 | | |
| October 1 | Northwestern State (OK) | McNulty Park; Tulsa, OK | W 35–0 | | |
| October 16 | Oklahoma A&M* | McNulty Park; Tulsa, OK (rivalry) | W 28–0 | | |
| October 23 | Phillips | McNulty Park; Tulsa, OK | W 19–0 | | |
| October 30 | at Northeastern State | Tahlequah, OK | W 17–0 | | |
| November 6 | Oklahoma Baptist | McNulty Park; Tulsa, OK | L 3–12 | | |
| November 18 | at Oklahoma City | Oklahoma City, OK | W 13–0 | | |
| November 25 | Arkansas* | McNulty Park; Tulsa, OK | W 14–7 | | |
| December 4 | Haskell*^{†} | McNulty Park; Tulsa, OK | L 7–27 | 8,000 | |
*Non-conference game; ^{†}Homecoming
