= Howard Acher =

American athlete and coach (1889–1957)

Biographical details
- Born: December 10, 1889; Cleveland, Ohio, U.S.
- Died: May 10, 1957 (aged 67); Albuquerque, New Mexico, U.S.

Playing career

Football
- 1909–1912: Grove City
- Positions: End, quarterback

Coaching career (HC unless noted)

Football
- 1913–1914: DuBois HS (PA)
- 1915: Grove City (assistant)
- 1916: Grove City
- 1919: Grove City
- 1922–1924: Tulsa

Basketball
- 1915–1917: Grove City
- 1918–1920: Grove City
- 1923–1925: Tulsa

Administrative career (AD unless noted)
- 1922–1925: Tulsa

Head coaching record
- Overall: 19–15–5 (college football); 46–41 (college basketball)

Accomplishments and honors

Championships
- Football; 1 OIC (1922)

Howard Mossman Acher (December 10, 1889 – May 10, 1957) was an American football, and basketball coach, athletics administrator, and banker. He served as the head football coach at Grove City in 1916 and 1919 and as head basketball coach from 1915 to 1917 and 1918 to 1920. He next served at the University of Tulsa from 1922 to 1925. He was also the head football coach for the Tulsa Golden Hurricane football team during the 1922, 1923 and 1924 seasons.

Archer was raised in Grove City, Pennsylvania, where he attended Grove City High School. At Grove City College, he played football at the end and quarterback positions, and captained the 1911 team. He also played basketball and tennis at the college. Arched coached at DuBois High School, in DuBois, Pennsylvania, from 1913 to 1914. He returned to Grove City College in 1915 as assistant football coach under head coach and athletic director Herbert W. Harmon. During World War I, he was commissioned as a second lieutenant in the United States Army, serving at Camp Lee in Virginia. After Archer left Grove City College in 1920, he worked for two years as an athletic supervisor for General Electric in Erie, Pennsylvania.

In 1925, Archer organized the Morris Plan Bank in Tulsa, Oklahoma, and served as its president. He later moved to Denver and then Albuquerque, New Mexico. Archer died on May 10, 1957, at the Veterans Hospital in Albuquerque.

== Head coaching record ==
=== College football ===
Year	Team	Overall	Conference	Standing	Bowl/playoffs
Grove City Crimson (Independent) (1916)
1916	Grove City	2–4–2			
Grove City Crimson (Independent) (1919)
1919	Grove City	6–0–1			
Grove City:		8–4–3			
Tulsa Golden Hurricane (Oklahoma Intercollegiate Conference) (1922–1924)
1922	Tulsa	8–0	4–0	T–1st	
1923	Tulsa	2–5–1			
1924	Tulsa	1–6–1	0–1–1	8th	
Tulsa:		11–11–2			
Total:		19–15–5			
National championship Conference title Conference division title or championship game berth

=== Basketball ===
Record table
Season	Team	Overall	Conference	Standing	Postseason
Grove City Crimson () (1915–1917)
1915–16	Grove City	9–7			
1916–17	Grove City	5–6			
Grove City Crimson () (1918–1920)
1918–19	Grove City	3–9			
1919–20	Grove City	13–7			
Grove City:		30–29 (.508)			
Tulsa Golden Hurricane () (1922–1925)
1922–23	Tulsa	1–3			
1923–24	Tulsa	2–1			
1924–25	Tulsa	13–8			
Tulsa:		16–12 (.571)			
Total:		46–41 (.529)			
