= 1924 Tulsa Golden Hurricane football team =

American college football season

1924 Tulsa Golden Hurricane football
- Conference: Oklahoma Intercollegiate Conference
- Record: 1–6–1 (0–1–1 OIC)
- Head coach: Howard Acher (3rd season)
- Home stadium: McNulty Park

1924 Oklahoma Intercollegiate Conference football standings
	Conf.					Overall
Team	W		L		T	W		L		T
Central State Teachers $	7	–	0	–	0	9	–	2	–	0
Oklahoma Baptist	6	–	1	–	0	8	–	3	–	0
Southeastern Oklahoma State	4	–	2	–	0	4	–	4	–	0
Southwestern State	3	–	2	–	0	5	–	3	–	0
Northwestern Oklahoma State	2	–	2	–	1	4	–	4	–	1
Phillips	2	–	3	–	0	2	–	7	–	0
East Central	3	–	5	–	0	3	–	6	–	0
Tulsa	0	–	1	–	1	1	–	6	–	1
Northeastern State	0	–	4	–	0	3	–	6	–	0
Oklahoma City	0	–	7	–	0	1	–	8	–	0
$ – Conference champion

The 1924 Tulsa Golden Hurricane football team was the representative team for the University of Tulsa during the 1924 college football season. In their third year under head coach Howard Acher, the Golden Hurricane compiled a 1–6–1 record. The team played its home games at McNulty Park in Tulsa.

== Schedule ==
Date	Time	Opponent	Site	Result	Source
October 4		Haskell*	McNulty Park; Tulsa, OK	L 3–26	
October 11		Ozarks*	McNulty Park; Tulsa, OK	W 7–0	
October 25		Central State Teachers	McNulty Park; Tulsa, OK	L 0–20	
November 1		at Tennessee Docs*	Russwood Park; Memphis, TN	L 0–43	
November 7	3:00 p.m.	at St. Edwards*	Clark Field; Austin, TX	L 7–35	
November 15		Northwestern Oklahoma State	McNulty Park; Tulsa, OK	T 0–0	
November 22		Austin*	McNulty Park; Tulsa, OK	L 0–9	
November 27		Arkansas Tech*	McNulty Park; Tulsa, OK	L 7–24	
*Non-conference game; All times are in Central time
