= Mont McIntire =

American football player and coach (1884–1963)

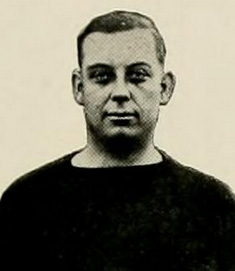
- Pictured in The Monticola 1920, West Virginia yearbook

Biographical details
- Born: September 30, 1884; Wetzel County, West Virginia, U.S.
- Died: January 10, 1963 (aged 78); New Martinsville, West Virginia, U.S.

Playing career
- 1906–1908: West Virginia
- Position: Tackle

Coaching career (HC unless noted)
- 1909: West Virginia (assistant)
- 1912–1913: West Virginia Wesleyan
- 1915: West Virginia (assistant)
- 1916–1920: West Virginia
- 1921–1923: Phillips

Head coaching record
- Overall: 51–22–6

Accomplishments and honors

Championships
- 1 OIC (1922)

Montford M. "Tubby" McIntire (September 30, 1884 – January 10, 1963) was an American football coach. He was the 17th head football coach at West Virginia University in Morgantown, West Virginia, serving for four seasons, from 1916 to 1920, and compiling a record of 24–11–4. West Virginia did not field a team in 1918 due to World War I.

McIntire was the head football coach at Phillips University in Enid, Oklahoma from 1921 to 1923. He resigned following the 1923 season and intended to return to his home state of West Virginia.

McIntire died in 1963 of coronary thrombosis.

== Head coaching record ==
Year	Team	Overall	Conference	Standing
West Virginia Wesleyan Bobcats (Independent) (1912–1913)
1912	West Virginia Wesleyan	8–0		
1913	West Virginia Wesleyan	5–3		
West Virginia Wesleyan:		13–3		
West Virginia Mountaineers (Independent) (1916–1920)
1916	West Virginia	5–2–2		
1917	West Virginia	6–3–1		
1918	No team—World War I			
1919	West Virginia	8–2		
1920	West Virginia	5–4–1		
West Virginia:		24–11–4		
Phillips Haymakers (Oklahoma Intercollegiate Conference) (1921–1923)
1921	Phillips	3–4–2		
1922	Phillips	7–1	5–0	T–1st
1923	Phillips	4–3		
Phillips:		14–8–2		
Total:		51–22–6		
National championship Conference title Conference division title or championship game berth
