= Ray Ballard =

American football and basketball player and coach (1897–1970)

Biographical details
- Born: April 6, 1897; Woodward, Oklahoma, U.S.
- Died: October 1970 (aged 63)

Playing career

Football
- 1914–1917: Northwestern Territorial

Coaching career (HC unless noted)

Football
- 1920–1921: Phillips (assistant)
- 1925–1927: Northeastern State

Basketball
- 1922–1923: Phillips

Administrative career (AD unless noted)
- 1922–1923: Phillips
- 1925–1929: Northeastern State

Head coaching record
- Overall: 9–15–3

Ray Halcomb Ballard (April 6, 1897 – October 1970) was an American college football and basketball player and coach. He served as the head football coach at Northeastern State University from 1925 to 1927.

== Head coaching record ==
Year	Team	Overall	Conference	Standing
Northeastern State Redmen (Oklahoma Intercollegiate Conference) (1925–1928)
1925	Northeastern State	2–6–2	2–3–2	6th
1926	Northeastern State	4–5	3–3	T–4th
1927	Northeastern State	3–4–1	2–3–1	6th
Northeastern State:		9–15–3	7–9–3	
Total:		9–15–3		
