= 1925 Tulsa Golden Hurricane football team =

American college football season

1925 Tulsa Golden Hurricane football

OIC champion
- Conference: Oklahoma Intercollegiate Conference
- Record: 6–2 (4–0 OIC)
- Head coach: Gus Henderson (1st season)
- Home stadium: Lee Stadium, McNulty Park

1925 Oklahoma Intercollegiate Conference football standings
	Conf.					Overall
Team	W		L		T	W		L		T
Tulsa $	4	–	0	–	0	6	–	2	–	0
Oklahoma Baptist	6	–	1	–	0	8	–	1	–	0
Central State Teachers	4	–	1	–	1	4	–	3	–	2
Southwestern State	3	–	1	–	1	5	–	4	–	1
Northwestern Oklahoma State	2	–	2	–	0	5	–	4	–	0
Northeastern State	2	–	3	–	2	2	–	6	–	2
Oklahoma City	3	–	5	–	0	4	–	6	–	0
East Central	2	–	4	–	1	3	–	5	–	1
Phillips	1	–	6	–	0	1	–	8	–	0
Southeastern Oklahoma State	0	–	4	–	1	2	–	4	–	2
$ – Conference champion

The 1925 Tulsa Golden Hurricane football team represented the University of Tulsa during the 1925 college football season. In their first year under head coach Gus Henderson, the Golden Hurricane compiled a 6–2 record, won the Oklahoma Intercollegiate Conference championship, and outscored their opponents by a total of 128 to 91.

== Schedule ==
Date	Opponent	Site	Result	Source
September 26	Tonkawa Prep*	Lee Stadium; Tulsa, OK	W 7–3	
October 3	Haskell*	McNulty Park; Tulsa, OK	L 0–33	
October 10	Tennessee Docs*	McNulty Park; Tulsa, OK	W 27–7	
October 30	Northwestern Oklahoma State	McNulty Park; Tulsa, OK	W 42–13	
November 7	at Phillips	Enid, OK	W 6–0	
November 11	Central State Teachers	McNulty Park; Tulsa, OK	W 20–8	
November 20	at Southeastern Oklahoma State	Durant, OK	W 19–7	
November 28	Arkansas*	McNulty Park; Tulsa, OK	L 7–20	
*Non-conference game
