= 1916 Kendall Orange and Black football team =

American college football season

1916 Kendall Orange and Black football

OIC champion
- Conference: Oklahoma Intercollegiate Conference
- Record: 10–0 (4–0 OIC)
- Head coach: Sam P. McBirney (4th season)
- Home stadium: Association Park

The 1916 Kendall Orange and Black football team represented Henry Kendall College, which was later renamed the University of Tulsa, during the 1916 college football season. In their fourth year under head coach Sam P. McBirney, the Orange and Black compiled a 10–0 record, won the Oklahoma Intercollegiate Conference championship, shut out five of ten opponents, and outscored their opponents by a total of 566 to 40, including high-scoring wins against Missouri Mines (117–0), St. Gregory's (82–0), Arkansas Cumberland (81–0), and Haskell (46–0).

In 1916, Kendall College's enrollment increased to 400 students, and McBirney petitioned the school to hire a full-time physical education teacher and assistant football coach. McBirney recommended that the school hire Arkansas City, Kansas, high school coach Francis Schmidt, who would later be inducted into the College Football Hall of Fame.

With McBirney as head coach and Schmidt as his assistant coach, the 1916 Tulsa team became the highest scoring college football team during the 1916 college football season. The 1916 team featured John Young, who had played for McBirney at Tulsa High School and who had been recruited by Fielding H. Yost to play for the University of Michigan, and Ivan Grove, who had played for Schmidt at Arkansas City High School and became the top scoring player in college football in 1916 with 196 points.

The 1916 team gained renown for its short passing offense and for the deceptive and unique play calling of McBirney and Schmidt. In one game, Ivan Grove completed 12 consecutive passes on a single scoring drive. In another game, the team successfully executed a play the called the "tower play." Ivan Grove threw a pass to Vergil Jones as he sat on the shoulders of Puny Blevins. The play resulted in a touchdown and was declared illegal the following year. Schmidt's biographer, Brett Perkins, has suggested that the short-passing game developed by McBirney and Schmidt in 1916 was later absorbed and perfected at TCU by Dutch Meyer and Sammy Baugh.

In the lowest scoring game of the 1916 season, Kendall College defeated the Oklahoma Sooners by a score of 16 to 0 at the Sooners' home field in Norman, Oklahoma. The victory at Norman broke an 18-game winning streak for Oklahoma, and was the first time that the Sooners were beaten in football by another school from Oklahoma. In the three games preceding the 1916 Oklahoma-Kendall game, Oklahoma had outscored its opponents 27–0, 107–0, and 140–0. The 1916 victory over the undefeated Sooners put Tulsa football on the map.

Historian and Tulsa journalist Jenk Jones recalled, "In 1916, there was a lot of agitation here to declare Tulsa the Champion of Mid America."

After the 1916 season, McBirney retired as Kendall's football coach to devote his full-time to the National Bank of Commerce where he served as vice president. McBirney had hand-picked Francis Schmidt as his successor, but Schmidt enlisted in the U.S. Army after the United States entered World War I in April 1917. After two years of military service, Schmidt led the team to back-to-back undefeated seasons in 1919 and 1920 before moving on to a successful coaching career with Arkansas, TCU and Ohio State.

== Schedule ==
Date	Opponent	Site	Result	Attendance	Source
September 30	Arkansas Cumberland*	Association Park; Tulsa, OK	W 81–0		
October 6	at Phillips	Enid, OK	W 50–7		
October 14	at Oklahoma	Boyd Field; Norman, OK	W 16–0		
October 21	Northwestern Oklahoma State	Association Park; Tulsa, OK	W 60–7		
October 28	Pittsburg Normal*	Association Park; Tulsa, OK	W 49–3		
November 4	Oklahoma A&M	Association Park; Tulsa, OK (rivalry)	W 17–13	3,000	
November 11	at Kansas City Veterinary*	Federal Park; Kansas City, MO	W 48–10		
November 18	Haskell*	Association Park; Tulsa, OK	W 46–0		
November 25	St. Gregory's*	Association Park; Tulsa, OK	W 82–0		
November 30	Missouri Mines*	Association Park; Tulsa, OK	W 117–0		
*Non-conference game
