= Joe Milam =

American football player and coach (1899–1971)

Biographical details
- Born: March 13, 1899; Amorita, Oklahoma, U.S.
- Died: November 8, 1989 (aged 90); Amorita, Oklahoma, U.S.

Playing career
- 1919–1922: Phillips
- 1925: Kansas City Cowboys
- Positions: Guard, end, tackle

Coaching career (HC unless noted)
- 1923–1924: East Central
- 1926–1931: Southwestern Oklahoma State

Head coaching record
- Overall: 29–34–8

Accomplishments and honors

Championships
- 1 OIC (1926)

Joseph Baker Milam (March 13, 1899 – November 25, 1971) was an American professional football player and college football coach. He played for the Kansas City Cowboys of the National Football League (NFL) in 1925.

== Head coaching record ==
Year	Team	Overall	Conference	Standing
East Central Tigers (Oklahoma Intercollegiate Conference) (1923–1924)
1923	East Central	5–3	4–3	
1924	East Central	3–6	3–5	7th
East Central:		8–9	7–8	
Southwestern Oklahoma State Bulldogs (Oklahoma Intercollegiate Conference) (1926–1928)
1926	Southwestern Oklahoma State	7–2	5–0	1st
1927	Southwestern Oklahoma State	1–6–2	1–5–1	9th
1928	Southwestern Oklahoma State	5–2–2	2–2–2	T–7th
Southwestern Oklahoma State Bulldogs (Oklahoma Collegiate Conference) (1929–1931)
1929	Southwestern Oklahoma State	2–8–1	1–4	5th
1930	Southwestern Oklahoma State	2–5–1	0–4–1	6th
1931	Southwestern Oklahoma State	4–2–2	1–2–2	T–4th
Southwestern Oklahoma State:		21–25–8	10–17–6	
Total:		29–34–8		
National championship Conference title Conference division title or championship game berth
