= Ivan Grove =

American athlete and coach (1894–1984)

Biographical details
- Born: August 18, 1894; Denver, Colorado, U.S.
- Died: January 2, 1984 (aged 89); Conway, Arkansas, U.S.

Playing career
- 1914–1916, 1919: Kendall
- Position: Quarterback

Coaching career (HC unless noted)

Football
- 1920–1921: Oklahoma Baptist
- 1922–1923: Arkansas (assistant)
- 1924–1955: Hendrix

Basketball
- 1920–1922: Oklahoma Baptist
- 1924–1946: Hendrix

Track
- 1924–1958: Hendrix

Administrative career (AD unless noted)
- 1924–1959: Hendrix

Head coaching record
- Overall: 111–126–16 (football)

Accomplishments and honors

Awards
- Arkansas Sports Hall of Fame; Hendrix Hall of Fame (1994); Tulsa Hall of Fame (1982)

Ivan H. Grove (August 18, 1894 – January 2, 1984) was an American football, basketball and track coach and college athlete.

== College athlete ==
As a college athlete at the University of Tulsa (then known as the Kendall Institute), he led the nation with 196 points in 1919 Kendall Orange and Black football team as a quarterback under head coach Francis Schmidt.

== College coach ==
Grove spent two years as the head football coach at Oklahoma Baptist University from 1920 to 1921. In 1922, he was hired by Francis Schmidt as the first full-time paid assistant coach at the University of Arkansas, where he coached for two years.

Grove was then hired as the head coach and athletic director at Hendrix College in Conway, Arkansas, where coached until he retired in 1959.

== Death ==
In retirement, Grove lived a block from the Hendrix campus. He died on January 2, 1984.

== Head coaching record ==
Year	Team	Overall	Conference	Standing	Bowl/playoffs
Oklahoma Baptist Bison (Independent) (1920–1921)
1920	Oklahoma Baptist	5–5			
1921	Oklahoma Baptist	3–5–1			
Oklahoma Baptist:		8–10–1			
Hendrix Bulldogs (Independent) (1924–1927)
1924	Hendrix	5–3–1			
1925	Hendrix	6–2–1			
1926	Hendrix	7–1–1			
1927	Hendrix	5–3–1			
Hendrix Warriors (Arkansas Intercollegiate Conference) (1928–1955)
1928	Hendrix	2–5–1			
1929	Hendrix	6–2–1			
1930	Hendrix	6–3			
1931	Hendrix	4–5			
1932	Hendrix	6–2–2			
1933	Hendrix	4–4–1			
1934	Hendrix	3–5–2			
1935	Hendrix	6–3			
1936	Hendrix	6–3–1			
1937	Hendrix	6–2			
1938	Hendrix	5–4			
1939	Hendrix	4–4–1			
1940	Hendrix	3–6			
1941	No team				
1942	No team—World War II				
1943	No team—World War II				
1944	No team—World War II				
1945	No team—World War II				
1946	Hendrix	1–8	1–5	7th	
1947	Hendrix	4–5–1			
1948	Hendrix	2–7			
1949	Hendrix	3–5–1			
1950	Hendrix	4–4			
1951	Hendrix	3–4			
1952	Hendrix	1–5			
1953	Hendrix	1–6			
1954	Hendrix	0–7			
1955	Hendrix	0–8			
Hendrix:		103–116–15			
Total:		111–126–16			

== See also ==
- List of college football coaches with 100 losses
