= 1922 Tulsa Golden Hurricane football team =

American college football season

1922 Tulsa Golden Hurricane football

OIC co-champion
- Conference: Oklahoma Intercollegiate Conference
- Record: 8–0 (4–0 OIC)
- Head coach: Howard Acher (1st season)
- Home stadium: Lee Stadium

1922 Oklahoma Intercollegiate Conference football standings
	Conf.					Overall
Team	W		L		T	W		L		T
Phillips +	5	–	0	–	0	7	–	1	–	0
Tulsa +	4	–	0	–	0	8	–	0	–	0
Southeastern Oklahoma State +	3	–	1	–	0	7	–	1	–	1
Oklahoma A&M	2	–	0	–	0	4	–	4	–	1
Central State Teachers	5	–	3	–	0	7	–	4	–	0
Southwestern State	4	–	3	–	0	5	–	4	–	0
East Central	2	–	3	–	0	5	–	3	–	1
Northwestern Oklahoma State	1	–	4	–	1	3	–	4	–	1
Oklahoma Baptist	1	–	6	–	1	2	–	7	–	1
Oklahoma City	0	–	7	–	0	0	–	9	–	0
$ – Conference champion

The 1922 Tulsa Golden Hurricane football team represented the University of Tulsa during the 1922 college football season. In their first year under head coach Howard Acher, Tulsa compiled an 8–0 record and outscored their opponents by a total of 156 to 60. The team's victories included wins over Texas A&M (13–10), TCU (2–0), and Arkansas (13–6).

== Schedule ==
Date	Opponent	Site	Result	Source
September 29	at Arkansas Tech*	Russellville, AR	W 14–12	
October 7	Southeastern Oklahoma State	Lee Stadium; Tulsa, OK	W 26–9	
October 10	vs. Texas A&M*	Dallas, TX	W 13–10	
October 20	Oklahoma Baptist	Lee Stadium; Tulsa, OK	W 34–9	
October 28	TCU*	Lee Stadium; Tulsa, OK	W 21–0	
November 4	at Arkansas*	The Hill; Fayetteville, AR	W 13–6	
November 11	at Oklahoma A&M	Lewis Field; Stillwater, OK	Cancelled†	
November 18	Southwestern Oklahoma State	Lee Stadium; Tulsa, OK	W 21–14	
November 30	Central State Teachers	Lee Stadium; Tulsa, OK	W 14–0	
*Non-conference game

† Tulsa states "Mutually agreed not to play the game," while Oklahoma State deems this a "mutual forfeit."
