= Arthur F. Smith =

American football coach

Playing career

Football
- c. 1913: Missouri Wesleyan

Coaching career (HC unless noted)

Football
- 1914–1915: Leavenworth HS (KS)
- 1916–1917: Tucson HS (AZ)
- 1918: Kendall
- 1919: Baker
- 1920–1921: Kenyon

Head coaching record
- Overall: 8–12–7

Arthur F. Smith was an American football coach. He served as the head football coach the University of Tulsa in 1918, Baker University in Baldwin City, Kansas, in 1919, and Kenyon College in Gambier, Ohio from 1920 to 1921, compiling a career college football coaching record of record of 8–12–7.

Smith attended Missouri Wesleyan College in Cameron, Missouri, where he played football and baseball before graduating in 1914. He began his coaching career in 1914 at Leavenworth High School in Leavenworth, Kansas and moved to Tucson High School in Tucson, Arizona two years later. He joined the coaching staff at the University of Illinois in 1922.

== Head coaching record ==
Year	Team	Overall	Conference	Standing	Bowl/playoffs
Kendall Orange and Black (Oklahoma Intercollegiate Conference) (1918)
1918	Kendall	1–2			
Kendall:		1–2			
Baker Wildcats (Kansas Collegiate Athletic Conference) (1919)
1919	Baker	4–4–1	3–2–1	T–5th	
Baker:		4–4–1	3–2–1		
Kenyon Lords (Ohio Athletic Conference) (1920–1921)
1920	Kenyon	2–5–1	1–5–1	15th	
1921	Kenyon	1–1–5	1–1–4	T–9th	
Kenyon:		3–6–6	2–6–5		
Total:		8–12–7			
