= Archie W. Butcher =

American football player and coach (1901–1981)

Biographical details
- Born: April 29, 1901; Solomon, Kansas, U.S.
- Died: May 29, 1981 (aged 80); Salina, Kansas, U.S.

Playing career

Football
- 1923–1924: Kansas State
- Position: Running back

Coaching career (HC unless noted)

Football
- 1928–1929: Ottawa (KS)
- 1930: Oklahoma Baptist

Basketball
- 1930–1931: Oklahoma Baptist

Head coaching record
- Overall: 6–18–1 (football); 5–10 (basketball)

Archie W. Butcher (April 29, 1901 – May 29, 1981) was an American college football player and coach. He served as the head football coach at Ottawa University in Ottawa, Kansas from 1928 to 1929 and at Oklahoma Baptist University in 1930, compiling a career college football head coaching record of 6–18–1. Butcher was also the head basketball coach at Oklahoma Baptist for one season, in 1930–31, tallying a mark of 5–10.

He obtained a degree in medicine from the University of Kansas School of Medicine in 1935, practicing in Miltonvale and Wakefield before moving to Abilene where he retired in 1976. Butcher died in 1981 at the age of 80.

== Head coaching record ==
=== Football ===
| Year | Team | Overall | Conference | Standing | Bowl/playoffs |
|---|---|---|---|---|---|
Ottawa Braves (Kansas Collegiate Athletic Conference) (1928–1929)
| 1928 | Ottawa | 0–7–1 | 0–6–1 | T–9th | |
| 1929 | Ottawa | 2–6 | 0–5 | 6th | |
| Ottawa: | | 2–13–1 | 0–11–1 | | |
Oklahoma Baptist Bison (Big Four Conference) (1930)
| 1930 | Oklahoma Baptist | 4–5 | 0–3 | 4th | |
| Oklahoma Baptist: | | 4–5 | 0–3 | | |
| Total: | | 6–18–1 | | | |

=== Basketball ===
Statistics overview
| Season | Team | Overall | Conference | Standing | Postseason |
|---|---|---|---|---|---|
Oklahoma Baptist Bison (Big Four Conference) (1930–1931)
| 1930–31 | Oklahoma Baptist | 5–10 | 2–3 | | |
| Oklahoma Baptist: | | 5–10 | 2–3 | | |
| Total: | | 5–10 | | | |
