= Vic Hurt =

American athletics coach and college athletic administrator

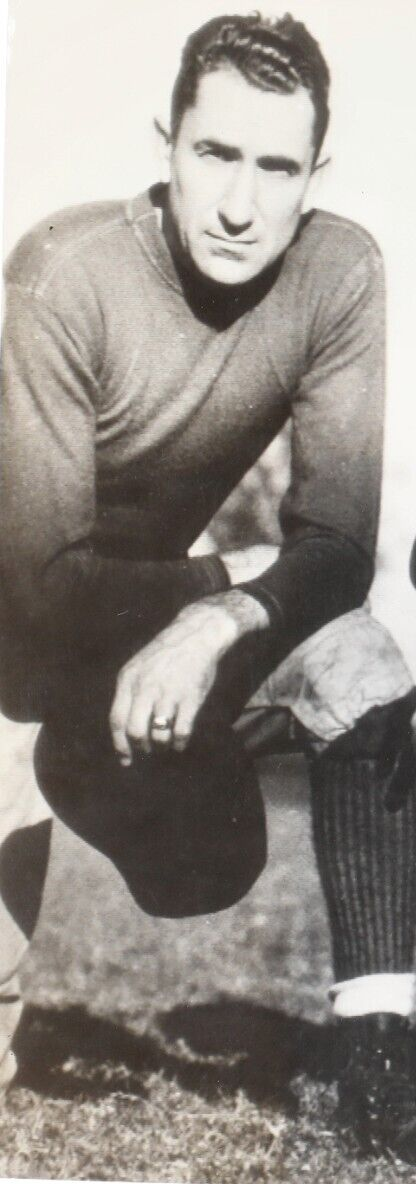
- Hurt in 1935

Biographical details
- Born: March 13, 1899
- Died: May 17, 1978 (aged 79)

Coaching career (HC unless noted)

Football
- 1923–1929: Oklahoma Baptist
- 1931–1934: Oklahoma Baptist
- 1935: SMU (assistant)
- 1936–1938: Tulsa
- 1939–1942: Kansas (assistant)

Basketball
- 1923–1930: Oklahoma Baptist
- 1931–1935: Oklahoma Baptist

Head coaching record
- Overall: 78–38–12 (football); 81–86 (basketball)

Accomplishments and honors

Championships
- Football; 1 OIC (1927); 3 MVC (1936–1938)

Victor Clinton Hurt (March 13, 1899 – May 17, 1978) was an American football, basketball, and track coach and college athletic administrator. He attended College of Emporia and played football for the Presbies football team. He began his coaching career in 1920. For 11 years, he coached track, basketball and football and was the athletic director at Oklahoma Baptist University. During the 1935 season, he was an assistant coach on the 1935 SMU Mustangs football team that went undefeated in the regular season. He was the head football coach for the Tulsa Golden Hurricane football team during the 1936, 1937, and 1938 seasons. After the 1938 season, he joined the coaching staff at the University of Kansas. He coached for four years at Kansas and, in 1944, he was hired as the manager of the Philbrook Museum of Art in Tulsa. He later became president of the Southwest Art Association and, in 1958, was inducted into the National Association of Intercollegiate Athletics (NAIA) Hall of Fame.

== Head coaching record ==
=== Football ===
Year	Team	Overall	Conference	Standing	Bowl/playoffs
Oklahoma Baptist Bison (Oklahoma Intercollegiate Conference) (1923–1928)
1923	Oklahoma Baptist	4–4–1			
1924	Oklahoma Baptist	8–3	6–1	2nd	
1925	Oklahoma Baptist	8–1	6–1	2nd	
1926	Oklahoma Baptist	6–1–1	4–1–1	3rd	
1927	Oklahoma Baptist	6–1–2	5–1–1	T–1st	
1928	Oklahoma Baptist	5–2–2	4–1–2	2nd	
Oklahoma Baptist Bison (Big Four Conference) (1929)
1929	Oklahoma Baptist	5–3	2–3	T–2nd	
Oklahoma Baptist Bison (Big Four Conference) (1931–1932)
1931	Oklahoma Baptist	3–6	1–2	3rd	
1932	Oklahoma Baptist	5–4	2–1	2nd	
Oklahoma Baptist Bison (Independent) (1933–1934)
1933	Oklahoma Baptist	6–2–1			
1934	Oklahoma Baptist	7–2			
Tulsa Golden Hurricane (Missouri Valley Conference) (1936–1938)
1936	Tulsa	5–2–2	3–0	T–1st	
1937	Tulsa	6–2–2	3–0	1st	
1938	Tulsa	4–5–1	3–1	1st	
Tulsa:		15–9–5	9–1		
Total:		78–38–12			
