= Chris Jensen (American football) =

American football coach (born 1969)

Current position
- Title: Head coach
- Team: Oklahoma Baptist
- Conference: GAC
- Record: 48–85

Biographical details
- Born: March 17, 1969 (age 57); Lawton, Oklahoma, U.S.
- Education: University of Oklahoma (1992); Southwestern Oklahoma State University (2006)

Playing career
- 1990–1991: Oklahoma
- Positions: Tackle, guard

Coaching career (HC unless noted)
- 1993–1995: Little Axe HS (OK) (OL/OLB)
- 1996–1998: Moore HS (OK) (OL)
- 1999–2001: Durant HS (OK) (AHC/OC)
- 2002–2004: Bartlesville HS (OK) (OC)
- 2005–2007: Westmoore HS (OK) (DC)
- 2008–2011: Southmoore HS (OK)
- 2012–present: Oklahoma Baptist

Head coaching record
- Overall: 48–85 (college); 24–20 (high school)
- Bowls: 1–0

Christopher Jensen (born March 17, 1969) is an American college football coach. He is the head football coach for Oklahoma Baptist University, a position he has held since 2012. He also was the head coach for Southmoore High School from 2008 to 2011. He previously coached for Little Axe High School, Moore High School, Durant High School, Bartlesville High School, and Westmoore High School. He played college football for Oklahoma as a tackle and guard.

== Head coaching record ==
=== College ===
Year	Team	Overall	Conference	Standing	Bowl/playoffs
Oklahoma Baptist Bison (Central States Football League) (2013–2014)
2013	Oklahoma Baptist	3–8	2–3	4th	
2014	Oklahoma Baptist	8–3	3–2	3rd	
Oklahoma Baptist Bison (Great American Conference) (2015–present)
2015	Oklahoma Baptist	2–9	2–9	10th	
2016	Oklahoma Baptist	2–9	2–9	T–10th	
2017	Oklahoma Baptist	2–9	2–9	T–11th	
2018	Oklahoma Baptist	5–6	5–6	T–6th	
2019	Oklahoma Baptist	7–4	7–4	5th	
2020–21	No team—COVID-19				
2021	Oklahoma Baptist	8–4	7–4	T–5th	W Heritage
2022	Oklahoma Baptist	1–10	1–10	T–11th	
2023	Oklahoma Baptist	6–5	6–5	T–4th	
2024	Oklahoma Baptist	2–9	2–9	T–11th	
2025	Oklahoma Baptist	2–9	2–9	T–9th	
2026	Oklahoma Baptist	0–0	0–0		
Oklahoma Baptist:		48–85	41–79		
Total:		48–85			

=== High school ===
Year	Team	Overall	Conference	Standing	Bowl/playoffs
Southmoore SaberCats () (2008–2011)
2008	Southmoore	2–8	1–6	T–7th	
2009	Southmoore	11–2	6–1	1st	
2010	Southmoore	6–4	3–3	4th	
2011	Southmoore	5–6	4–3	T–3rd	
Southmoore:		24–20	14–13		
Total:		24–20			
National championship Conference title Conference division title or championship game berth

== Personal life ==
Jensen is married to his wife Patti and they have four children. The Jensens are members of the Baptist Church.
