= Clyde Becker =

American football player, coach and geologist (1882–1938)

Biographical details
- Born: May 23, 1882; Arlington, Iowa, U.S.
- Died: July 18, 1938 (aged 56); Chickasha, Oklahoma, U.S.

Playing career
- 1908–1911: Oklahoma Baptist

Coaching career (HC unless noted)
- 1911: Oklahoma Baptist

Clyde McKee Becker (May 23, 1882 – July 19, 1938) was an American geologist and college football player and coach. He served as a player-coach at Oklahoma Baptist University in Shawnee, Oklahoma in 1911.
