= 1953 Gator Bowl =

American college football game

Tulsa Golden Hurricane	Florida Gators
(8–1–1)	(7–3)
MVC	SEC
13	14
Head coach: Buddy Brothers	Head coach: Bob Woodruff
AP / Coaches; 12 / NR	AP / Coaches; 15 / NR
	1	2	3	4	Total
Tulsa	0	0	7	6	13
Florida	7	7	0	0	14
- Date: January 1, 1953
- Season: 1952
- Stadium: Gator Bowl
- Location: Jacksonville, Florida
- MVP: RB John Hall (Florida); T Marv Matuszak (Tulsa)
- Referee: Ronald Gibbs (MVC; split crew: MVC, SEC)
- Attendance: 30,015 (26,500 paid)

The 1953 Gator Bowl was a post-season college football bowl game between the Tulsa Golden Hurricane of the Missouri Valley Conference and the Florida Gators representing the Southeastern Conference (SEC). Florida defeated Tulsa, 14–13. This was the Gators' first appearance in an NCAA-sanctioned bowl game.

== Game summary ==
An extra point by Rick Casares proved to be the difference. Florida outrushed the Golden Hurricane 233 to 182, while Tulsa outpassed the Gators 132 to 101. The Golden Hurricane turned the ball over twice, while Florida committed five turnovers. This was the first Gator Bowl in which more than one player was awarded MVP honors, a practice that continued until 2011.

The attendance for the game was 30,015.

=== Scoring summary ===
- Florida - Rick Casares, 2-yard touchdown run (Casares kick)
- Florida - J. Hall, 37-yard touchdown pass from Fred Robinson (Casares kick)
- Tulsa - J. C. Roberts. 3-yard touchdown run (Tom Miner kick)
- Tulsa - Howard Waugh, 2-yard touchdown run (kick failed)

=== Game statistics ===
- First Downs — Florida 20, Tulsa 17
- Yards Rushing — Florida 233, Tulsa 182
- Yards Passing — Florida 101, Tulsa 132
- Passing Completions-Attempts — Florida 7–11; Tulsa 10–16
- Penalty Yards — Florida 34, Tulsa 84
- Turnovers — Florida 5, Tulsa 2
- Punts — Florida 1, Tulsa 4
