= F. A. Dry =

American football player and coach (1931–2026)

Biographical details
- Born: September 2, 1931; Fairland, Oklahoma, U.S.
- Died: November 11, 2026 (aged 95); Fort Worth, Texas, U.S.

Playing career
- 1950–1952: Oklahoma A&M
- Position: Center

Coaching career (HC unless noted)
- 1966–1970: Houston Oilers (assistant)
- 1972–1976: Tulsa
- 1977–1982: TCU
- 1984–1992: Baylor (assistant)

Administrative career (AD unless noted)
- 1971–1976: Tulsa

Head coaching record
- Overall: 43–69–4
- Bowls: 0–1

Accomplishments and honors

Championships
- 4 MVC (1973–1976)

F. A. Dry (September 2, 1931 – November 11, 2026) was an American football coach. He was the head football coach for the University of Tulsa from 1972 to 1976. During his tenure there, he compiled a 31–18–1 record. After four straight Missouri Valley Conference championships Dry departed for Texas Christian University (TCU), where he compiled a 12–51–3 record. Dry played football at Oklahoma A&M (now Oklahoma State University), from 1950 to 1952.

Dry was born in Fairland, Oklahoma, in 1931, the son of Floyd Albert and Mabyl Dry. His given name was "F. A.", as a compromise between his parents, who disagreed on what to name him at birth. Dry died in Fort Worth, Texas, on November 11, 2026, at the age of 95.

== Head coaching record ==
Year	Team	Overall	Conference	Standing	Bowl/playoffs	Coaches^{#}	AP^{°}
Tulsa Golden Hurricane (Missouri Valley Conference) (1972–1976)
1972	Tulsa	3–2 (Note: Claude "Hoot" Gibson led the team for the first six games of the 1972 season before he was fired and replaced by Dry. Tulsa finished the year 4–7 overall and 3–2 in conference play.)	2–1	T–4th			
1973	Tulsa	6–5	5–1	T–1st			
1974	Tulsa	8–3	6–0	1st		19	
1975	Tulsa	7–4	4–0	1st			
1976	Tulsa	7–4–1	2–1–1	T–1st	L Independence		
Tulsa:		31–18–1	19–3–1				
TCU Horned Frogs (Southwest Conference) (1977–1982)
1977	TCU	2–9	1–7	6th			
1978	TCU	2–9	0–8	7th			
1979	TCU	2–8–1	1–6–1	8th			
1980	TCU	1–10	1–7	7th			
1981	TCU	2–7–2	1–6–1	8th			
1982	TCU	3–8	2–6	7th			
TCU:		12–51–3	6–40–2				
Total:		43–69–4					
National championship Conference title Conference division title or championship game berth
^{#}Rankings from final Coaches Poll.; ^{°}Rankings from final AP Poll.
