= Oklahoma State–Tulsa football rivalry =

College sports rivalry

- Oklahoma State Cowboys Tulsa Golden Hurricane
- Other names: Bank of Oklahoma Turnpike Classic
- Sport: American college football
- First meeting: October 16, 1914; Oklahoma A&M 13, Kendall 6
- Latest meeting: September 5, 2026; Tulsa 24, Oklahoma State 10
- Next meeting: September 18, 2027
- Stadiums: Boone Pickens Stadium (Oklahoma State); Skelly Field at H. A. Chapman Stadium (Tulsa)

Statistics
- Total meetings: 78
- All-time series: Oklahoma State leads, 44–29–5
- Largest victory: Tulsa, 55–6 (1943)
- Longest win streak: Oklahoma State, 10 (1999–2024)
- Current win streak: Tulsa, 2 (2025–present)

Locations of Oklahoma State and Tulsa

The Oklahoma State–Tulsa football rivalry (also known as the Turnpike Classic) is a college football rivalry game between Oklahoma State and Tulsa. The two teams first played each other in 1914, and the rivalry has been played on and off for a total of 78 games as of 2026.

== Series history ==
From 1935 to 1956, the two teams both competed in the Missouri Valley Conference. In those 22 seasons, the conference champion would be won by either Oklahoma State or Tulsa 16 times. They played each other annually from 1926 to 1965. Then played again regularly from 1981 to 2000. The two universities are approximately 70 miles apart via the Cimarron Turnpike.

In 1992, the Tulsa World reported that former Tulsa teammates Dave Rader and Denver Johnson were now coaching on opposite sides: Rader as Tulsa head coach and Johnson as Oklahoma State offensive line coach.

The Bank of Oklahoma began a sponsorship deal in 2017 with Oklahoma State and Tulsa to name the series the Bank of Oklahoma Turnpike Classic.

The next scheduled game between Oklahoma State and Tulsa is scheduled for September 19, 2029, in Stillwater, as part of annual home-and-home series that extends through 2031 with a hiatus in 2022 and 2023.

== Quotes on the series ==
"The University of Tulsa and Oklahoma State have a colorful history of compelling football games," wrote Bill Haisten for the Tulsa World in 2010. Bill Connors wrote 16 years earlier for the Tulsa World: "Tulsa and Oklahoma State never played each other in football when the game seemed insignificant to the participants."

Oklahoma State head coach Jimmy Johnson said in 1982: "OU and OSU, that's a rivalry, but not OSU and Tulsa." In contrast, Tulsa head coach John Cooper said about the Oklahoma State–Tulsa series: "It's a natural rivalry, and I don't think you can underestimate the importance of that."

In 2008, The Oklahoman sportswriter Berry Tramel wrote that this series "should be played regularly" because Tulsa had improved over the decade. However, Tramel changed his opinion in 2017: "OSU-Tulsa has faded away. . . . Conference realignment and economic realities have made it more difficult for age-old rivals to schedule, especially when they end up on different competitive planes."

== Notable games ==
=== 1945 ===
Oklahoma A&M 12 – Tulsa 6

Oklahoma A&M entered week 6 undefeated (5–0) ranked No. 11 and hosted a Tulsa team who had dropped to No. 19 after their first loss to Indiana the previous week. This is the only contest between the two schools with both teams ranked in the AP Poll. The Cowboys defeated the Golden Hurricane en route to an undefeated (9–0) national championship season.

=== 1995 ===
Tulsa 24 – Oklahoma State 23

Tulsa was trailing by 20 points in the fourth quarter, then scored three touchdowns in the final 5:41 to win 24–23 in what was then still called Skelly Stadium.

=== 2011 ===
Oklahoma State 59 – Tulsa 33

In week 3, Tulsa took on Oklahoma State in a home game that memorably lasted until 3:35 AM after inclement weather delayed the kickoff past midnight. The Golden Hurricane scored a field goal on their first drive to take an early lead but were unable to contain the Cowboys' potent offense and quickly fell behind for good. The team was further hindered by the loss of quarterback G.J. Kinne near the end of the first quarter, forcing them to rely heavily on the run for the remainder of the game.

=== 2025 ===
Tulsa 19 – Oklahoma State 12

With Tulsa at 1–2 and Oklahoma State at 1–1, the two teams met in Stillwater that saw Tulsa take an early lead and lead 16–3 at halftime. However, Oklahoma State narrowed it to 19–12 late in the fourth quarter. With two minutes remaining, the Cowboys failed to convert a fourth down at their own 39-yard line. Tulsa ran the clock down to under a minute before attempting a field goal from 50 yards out to try extending the lead to two possessions. However, the field goal missed, giving Oklahoma State one last possession with 26 seconds left. Through a series of passes, the Cowboys got the ball to Tulsa's 42-yard line with less than 15 seconds remaining but could not reach the end zone as Tulsa won the rivalry game for the first time since 1998 along with having their first victory in Stillwater since 1951.

The 2025 game was shown live on ESPN. Nielsen Media Research estimated the game had 1.38 million viewers.

Following the game, local media speculated that this outcome could cost Oklahoma State head coach Mike Gundy his job. During the game, Oklahoma State fans booed and chanted for Gundy to be fired. Oklahoma State eventually fired Gundy four days after the game on September 23.

== Game results ==
| Oklahoma State victories | Tulsa victories | Tie games |

| No. | Date | Location | Winner | Score |
|---|---|---|---|---|
| 1 | October 16, 1914 | Stillwater | Oklahoma A&M | 13–6 |
| 2 | October 15, 1915 | Stillwater | Tie | 0–0 |
| 3 | November 4, 1916 | Tulsa | Kendall | 17–13 |
| 4 | November 17, 1917 | Stillwater | Oklahoma A&M | 41–2 |
| 5 | November 23, 1918 | Tulsa | Oklahoma A&M | 33–0 |
| 6 | November 21, 1919 | Stillwater | Tie | 7–7 |
| 7 | October 9, 1920 | Tulsa | Tulsa | 20–14 |
| 8 | October 16, 1926 | Tulsa | Tulsa | 28–0 |
| 9 | October 26, 1927 | Stillwater | Tulsa | 28–26 |
| 10 | November 29, 1928 | Tulsa | Tulsa | 31–0 |
| 11 | November 2, 1929 | Stillwater | Oklahoma A&M | 20–0 |
| 12 | December 13, 1930 | Tulsa | Oklahoma A&M | 13–7 |
| 13 | November 14, 1931 | Tulsa | Oklahoma A&M | 7–6 |
| 14 | November 5, 1932 | Tulsa | Tie | 0–0 |
| 15 | November 4, 1933 | Tulsa | Oklahoma A&M | 7–0 |
| 16 | November 17, 1934 | Tulsa | Tulsa | 19–0 |
| 17 | October 26, 1935 | Tulsa | Tulsa | 12–0 |
| 18 | October 24, 1936 | Tulsa | Tulsa | 13–0 |
| 19 | October 23, 1937 | Tulsa | Tulsa | 27–0 |
| 20 | October 22, 1938 | Tulsa | Tulsa | 20–7 |
| 21 | October 14, 1939 | Tulsa | Oklahoma A&M | 9–7 |
| 22 | November 23, 1940 | Tulsa | Tulsa | 19–6 |
| 23 | October 25, 1941 | Stillwater | Tulsa | 16–0 |
| 24 | November 7, 1942 | Tulsa | No. 12 Tulsa | 34–6 |
| 25 | November 6, 1943 | Tulsa | No. 19 Tulsa | 55–6 |
| 26 | October 28, 1944 | Tulsa | Oklahoma A&M | 46–40 |
| 27 | November 10, 1945 | Stillwater | No. 11 Oklahoma A&M | 12–6 |
| 28 | November 9, 1946 | Tulsa | Tulsa | 20–18 |
| 29 | November 8, 1947 | Stillwater | Tulsa | 13–0 |
| 30 | November 6, 1948 | Tulsa | Oklahoma A&M | 19–0 |
| 31 | November 5, 1949 | Stillwater | Tie | 13–13 |
| 32 | November 4, 1950 | Tulsa | Tulsa | 17–13 |
| 33 | November 3, 1951 | Stillwater | Tulsa | 35–7 |
| 34 | November 1, 1952 | Tulsa | Tulsa | 23–21 |
| 35 | October 31, 1953 | Stillwater | Oklahoma A&M | 28–14 |
| 36 | October 30, 1954 | Tulsa | Oklahoma A&M | 12–0 |
| 37 | October 29, 1955 | Stillwater | Oklahoma A&M | 14–0 |
| 38 | October 13, 1956 | Tulsa | Tie | 14–14 |
| 39 | October 12, 1957 | Stillwater | Oklahoma State | 28–13 |
| 40 | October 11, 1958 | Tulsa | Tulsa | 24–16 |

| No. | Date | Location | Winner | Score |
|---|---|---|---|---|
| 41 | October 10, 1959 | Stillwater | Oklahoma State | 26–0 |
| 42 | October 8, 1960 | Tulsa | Oklahoma State | 28–7 |
| 43 | October 7, 1961 | Stillwater | Oklahoma State | 26–0 |
| 44 | October 6, 1962 | Tulsa | Oklahoma State | 17–7 |
| 45 | November 9, 1963 | Stillwater | Oklahoma State | 33–24 |
| 46 | October 31, 1964 | Tulsa | Tulsa | 61–14 |
| 47 | October 2, 1965 | Stillwater | Oklahoma State | 17–14 |
| 48 | September 11, 1976 | Stillwater | Oklahoma State | 33–21 |
| 49 | September 10, 1977 | Tulsa | No. 20 Oklahoma State | 34–17 |
| 50 | September 19, 1981 | Stillwater | Oklahoma State | 23–21 |
| 51 | September 19, 1982 | Tulsa | Tulsa | 25–15 |
| 52 | October 1, 1983 | Stillwater | Oklahoma State | 9–0 |
| 53 | September 29, 1984 | Tulsa | No. 10 Oklahoma State | 31–7 |
| 54 | October 5, 1985 | Stillwater | No. 6 Oklahoma State | 25–13 |
| 55 | September 13, 1986 | Tulsa | Tulsa | 27–23 |
| 56 | September 5, 1987 | Stillwater | Oklahoma State | 39–28 |
| 57 | October 1, 1988 | Stillwater | No. 13 Oklahoma State | 56–35 |
| 58 | September 9, 1989 | Tulsa | Tulsa | 20–10 |
| 59 | September 1, 1990 | Stillwater | Oklahoma State | 10–3 |
| 60 | September 7, 1991 | Tulsa | Tulsa | 13–7 |
| 61 | September 26, 1992 | Stillwater | Oklahoma State | 24–19 |
| 62 | September 18, 1993 | Tulsa | Oklahoma State | 16–10 |
| 63 | September 24, 1994 | Stillwater | Oklahoma State | 17–10 |
| 64 | September 9, 1995 | Tulsa | Tulsa | 24–23 |
| 65 | September 14, 1996 | Stillwater | Oklahoma State | 30–9 |
| 66 | September 12, 1998 | Tulsa | Tulsa | 35–20 |
| 67 | September 11, 1999 | Stillwater | Oklahoma State | 46–9 |
| 68 | September 9, 2000 | Tulsa | Oklahoma State | 36–26 |
| 69 | September 11, 2004 | Stillwater | Oklahoma State | 38–21 |
| 70 | September 18, 2010 | Stillwater | Oklahoma State | 65–28 |
| 71 | September 18, 2011 | Tulsa | No. 7 Oklahoma State | 59–33 |
| 72 | August 31, 2017 | Stillwater | No. 10 Oklahoma State | 59–24 |
| 73 | September 14, 2019 | Tulsa | Oklahoma State | 40–21 |
| 74 | September 19, 2020 | Stillwater | No. 11 Oklahoma State | 16–7 |
| 75 | September 11, 2021 | Stillwater | Oklahoma State | 28–23 |
| 76 | September 14, 2024 | Tulsa | No. 13 Oklahoma State | 45–10 |
| 77 | September 19, 2025 | Stillwater | Tulsa | 19–12 |
| 78 | September 5, 2026 | Tulsa | Tulsa | 24–10 |
Series: Oklahoma State leads 44–29–5
Note, the 1922 game was cancelled.

== See also ==
- List of NCAA college football rivalry games
