= Herbert W. Harmon =

American physicist, radio pioneer, college football coach (1871–1956)

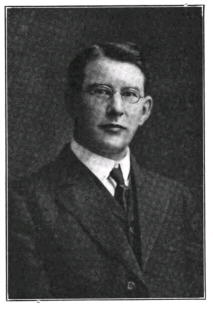
- Harmon in 1920

Biographical details
- Born: December 15, 1871; Stanley, New York, U.S.
- Died: September 22, 1956 (aged 84); Grove City, Pennsylvania, U.S.

Playing career

Baseball
- 1894–1895: Cornell

Coaching career (HC unless noted)

Football
- 1898–1905: California Normal (PA)
- 1906–1907: Grove City
- 1909–1913: Grove City
- 1915: Grove City

Administrative career (AD unless noted)
- c. 1915: Grove City

Herbert William Harmon (December 15, 1871 – September 22, 1956) was an American physicist, radio pioneer, and college football coach. Harmon was a physics professor at Grove City College in Grove City, Pennsylvania. He also served three stints as the head football coach at Grove City, from 1906 to 1907, 1909 to 1913, and in 1915.

Harmon graduated from Hobart College, in Geneva, New York, in 1893 and Cornell University in 1895. At Cornell, he played on the varsity baseball team in 1894 and 1895. Harmon coached at St. John's Military Academy (now known as St. John's Northwestern Military Academy) in Delafield, Wisconsin before going to Southwestern Normal School (now known as Pennsylvania Western University, California), located in California, Pennsylvania, in 1898. He coached at California for eight years.

Harmon built the first functioning radio transmitter in Western Pennsylvania, on the Grove City College campus, in 1913. He died on September 22, 1956, in Grove City.

== Head coaching record ==
Year	Team	Overall	Conference	Standing	Bowl/playoffs
Grove City Crimson (Independent) (1906–1907)
1906	Grove City	3–5–2			
1907	Grove City	2–6–1			
Grove City Crimson (Independent) (1909–1913)
1909	Grove City	6–2			
1910	Grove City	7–1–1			
1911	Grove City	8–0–1			
1912	Grove City	6–2–1			
1913	Grove City	5–4			
Grove City Crimson (Independent) (1915)
1915	Grove City	6–1			
Grove City:		43–21–6			
Total:					
