= Norman Leard =

American football coach and secretary

Normal Leard
Biographical details
- Born: March 23, 1875; Le Flore County, Oklahoma, U.S.
- Died: July 20, 1961 (aged 86); Hugo, Oklahoma, U.S.
- Education: Kendall College

Coaching career (HC unless noted)
- 1895–1897: Kendall

Head coaching record
- Overall: 5–1–1

Joseph Norman Leard (March 23, 1875 – July 20, 1961) was an American college football coach and secretary to Green McCurtain, principal chief of the Choctaw Nation of Oklahoma. He was one-thirty-second Choctaw origin and attended in the Indian schools in Oklahoma. He was the head football coach for the Kendall Orange and Black football team from 1895 to 1897. In addition to being the coach, he was also the captain and quarterback of Kendall's first football team.

== Head coaching record ==
Year	Team	Overall	Conference	Standing	Bowl/playoffs
Kendall Orange and Black (Independent) (1895–1897)
1895	Kendall	1–0			
1896	Kendall	2–0–1			
1897	Kendall	2–1			
Kendall:		5–1–1			
Total:		5–1–1			
