= 1991 Freedom Bowl =

- Freedom Bowl VIII
Tulsa Golden Hurricane	San Diego State Aztecs
(9–2)	(8–3–1)
28	17
Head coach: David Rader	Head coach: Al Luginbill
AP / Coaches; 22 / 25
	1	2	3	4	Total
Tulsa	7	7	7	7	28
San Diego State	7	7	0	3	17
- Date: December 30, 1991
- Season: 1991
- Stadium: Anaheim Stadium
- Location: Anaheim, California
- MVP: RB Ron Jackson (Tulsa)
- Attendance: 34,217

United States TV coverage
- Network: Raycom
- Announcers: Phil Stone and Dave Rowe

The Freedom Bowl featured the San Diego State Aztecs and the Tulsa Golden Hurricane as their postseason bowl game to end the 1991 NCAA Division I-A football season for both teams.

== Background ==
While the Aztecs finished second in the Western Athletic Conference, they were invited to their first bowl game since the 1986 Holiday Bowl. They were led by Marshall Faulk, who in his freshman year ran for 1,429 yards rushing and scored 23 total touchdowns. Meanwhile, this was Tulsa's 2nd bowl appearance in three seasons.

== Game summary ==
Ron Jackson scored all of Tulsa's touchdowns four in total with three of them giving Tulsa the lead and the final being the exclamation point. He rushed for 211 yards on 46 carries. Faulk gave the Aztecs the lead with a touchdown run, though Tulsa responded with by scoring two straight touchdown runs by Jackson. Lowery made the game tied at halftime with a touchdown run. But the Aztecs were stuffed in the second half, being held to a field goal with 83 total yards as Tulsa scored twice more and never looked back. A key moment in the game happened when quarterback/punter Gus Frerotte punted the ball to T. C. Wright with Tulsa leading 21–17. Wright was at his own eight when he fumbled the ball, and Billy Cole recovered for Tulsa. Two plays later, the Hurricane scored on Jackson's final touchdown to give Tulsa their first bowl win since 1964.

== Aftermath ==
The Hurricane went into a slump from that point on, going 26–57–1 under Rader in the eight years after the game before being fired, in contrast to his 26–26 record before this game. The Freedom Bowl would play three more games before disbanding after 1994.

== Statistics ==
Statistics	Tulsa	SDSU
First downs	23	21
Yards rushing	256	189
Yards passing	122	164
Total yards	378	353
Punts-Average	5-34.4	5-35.2
Fumbles-Lost	4-1	3–2
Interceptions	0	0
Penalties-Yards	2-20	6-38
