= Hoot Gibson (American football) =

American football player and coach (1939–2026)

No. 25
- Position: Cornerback

Personal information
- Born: May 26, 1938; Spruce Pine, North Carolina, U.S.
- Died: January 17, 2026 (aged 87)
- Listed height: 6 ft 1 in (1.85 m)
- Listed weight: 190 lb (86 kg)

Career information
- High school: Lee H. Edwards (Asheville, North Carolina)
- College: NC State
- NFL draft: 1961: 3rd round, 33rd overall pick
- AFL draft: 1961: 7th round, 55th overall pick

Career history

Playing
- San Diego Chargers (1961–1962); Oakland Raiders (1963–1965)

Coaching
- NC State (1967) Defensive backs coach; Boston Patriots (1968) Defensive backs coach; Buffalo Bills (1969) Assistant coach; Tulsa (1970-1972) Head coach; Mars Hill (1973-1982) Head coach

Awards and highlights
- SAC champion (1980); First-team All-ACC (1960)

Career AFL statistics
- Interceptions: 22
- Kick / Punt Return yards: 1,649
- Total touchdowns: 4
- Stats at Pro Football Reference

Head coaching record
- Career: 67–62–3 (.519)

Claude "Hoot" Andrew Gibson (May 26, 1938 – January 17, 2026) was an American football player and coach. A defensive back and kick returner, he played college football for the NC State Wolfpack before playing professionally in the American Football League (AFL) for the San Diego Chargers and the Oakland Raiders.

== Playing career ==
Gibson attended Lee H. Edwards High School in Asheville, North Carolina.

He was an instant star on the NC State Wolfpack freshman team, as a defensive back, receiver, return man and halfback. For the next three seasons, Gibson rarely came out of a ballgame. He led the Pack in punt returns in 1958 and 1960, kickoff returns in 1959 and interceptions in 1960 with four. He provided crucial rushing and receiving yards whenever needed. He played his entire senior season with a broken hand and wrist. Gibson concluded his senior year by playing in four post-season all-star games — Senior Bowl, Copper Bowl, Coaches All-America Bowl and the Chicago All-Star Game. Gibson, and teammate Roman Gabriel, with four appearances each, played in more postseason all-star games than any Wolfpack player ever.

It was Gibson's versatility, speed and daring that made him a valuable pro commodity. He was selected in the third round of the NFL Draft by the Chicago Bears. He elected instead to sign with the American Football League's San Diego Chargers. Gibson played two years for pro football hall of fame coach Sid Gillman at San Diego, leading the league in interceptions in 1962. During Gibson's rookie season, the Chargers lost to the Houston Oilers, 10–3, in the AFL Championship game. Soon after the championship, Earle Edwards encouraged Gibson to return to NC State to finish his degree work, and help coach spring ball. He received an education degree from State in 1961.

Gibson's first year in the pro ranks he picked up a nickname. His Charger teammates gave him the nickname "Hoot." "During my pro career I never saw my name in the paper as Claude", said Gibson. "It was 'Hoot' everywhere I went, and still is today."

Following the 1962 season, Gibson was traded to the AFL's Oakland Raiders, where his head coach was Al Davis. In both 1963 and 1964, Gibson led the AFL in punt returns, the only player in modern history to do so. In fact, Gibson owns the third best punt return average of all professional football players with 75 or more punt returns. Gibson returned 110 punts for 1,381 yards during his career for a 12.1 average. He scored three punt return touchdowns and had a long return of 85 yards. Gibson's pro career lasted five years, when he abruptly retired at age 27. For the next two years he served as a scout and recruiter in the Raiders' organization.

== Coaching career ==
In 1967 when Edwards had an opening come up on his staff, Gibson was the first person he called. Gibson returned to Raleigh just in time for what is arguably the greatest football season in NC State history. He coached the "white shoed" defensive backs of the 1967 Wolfpack, a squad that started the year 8–0 and rose to #3 in the polls. The 1967 Pack finished the year 9–2. Following the 1967 season, Gibson began a pro coaching career that lasted two years. At age 29, he coached the Boston Patriots defensive backs in 1968, becoming the youngest assistant coach in professional football. He spent the 1969 season on the Buffalo Bills staff.

In 1970, Gibson returned to college football as the offensive coordinator at the University of Tulsa. During July of that year, Gibson was elevated to interim head coach when Golden Hurricane coach Vince Carillot resigned. When Gibson's Tulsa squad started the season 4–1, which included a stunning upset of Memphis State, a team Tulsa had not beaten in six years, the interim label was removed. His first Golden Hurricane team finished 6–4. Gibson would spend three seasons at Tulsa, before returning home to the North Carolina mountains. He became the head football coach at Mars Hill College. He spent ten seasons there, compiling a 55–37–2 record, winning one South Atlantic Conference championship, producing four Division II All-Americans and 25 All-SAC players. He was recently inducted into the (State of) North Carolina Football Hall of Fame and the Mars Hill University Hall of Fame.

== Death ==
Gibson died on January 17, 2026, at the age of 87.

== Head coaching record ==
Year	Team	Overall	Conference	Standing	Bowl/playoffs
Tulsa Golden Hurricane (Missouri Valley Conference) (1970–1972)
1970	Tulsa	6–4	3–1	2nd	
1971	Tulsa	4–7	3–2	T–2nd	
1972	Tulsa	1–5 (Note: Gibson was fired after the first six games of the 1972 season and replaced by F. A. Dry. Tulsa finished the year 4–7 overall and 3–2 in conference play, tying for fourth place in the Missouri Valley Conference.)	1–1		
Tulsa:		11–16	7–4		
Mars Hill Lions (Carolinas Conference) (1973–1974)
1973	Mars Hill	5–6	2–2	3rd	
1974	Mars Hill	7–4	1–3	4th	
Mars Hill Lions (SAC-8) (1975–1982)
1975	Mars Hill	7–3	3–3	T–4th	
1976	Mars Hill	4–4–1	3–3–1	4th	
1977	Mars Hill	7–3	5–2	T–2nd	
1978	Mars Hill	5–7	2–5	T–5th	
1979	Mars Hill	7–2–1	5–1	2nd	
1980	Mars Hill	8–2–1	6–1	T–1st	L NAIA Division I Quarterfinal
1981	Mars Hill	5–5	3–4	T–4th	
1982	Mars Hill	1–10	1–6	7th	
Mars Hill:		56–46–3	31–30–1		
Total:		67–62–3			
National championship Conference title Conference division title or championship game berth

== See also ==
- List of American Football League players
