= Albuquerque Veterans Administration Medical Center =

- U.S. National Register of Historic Places
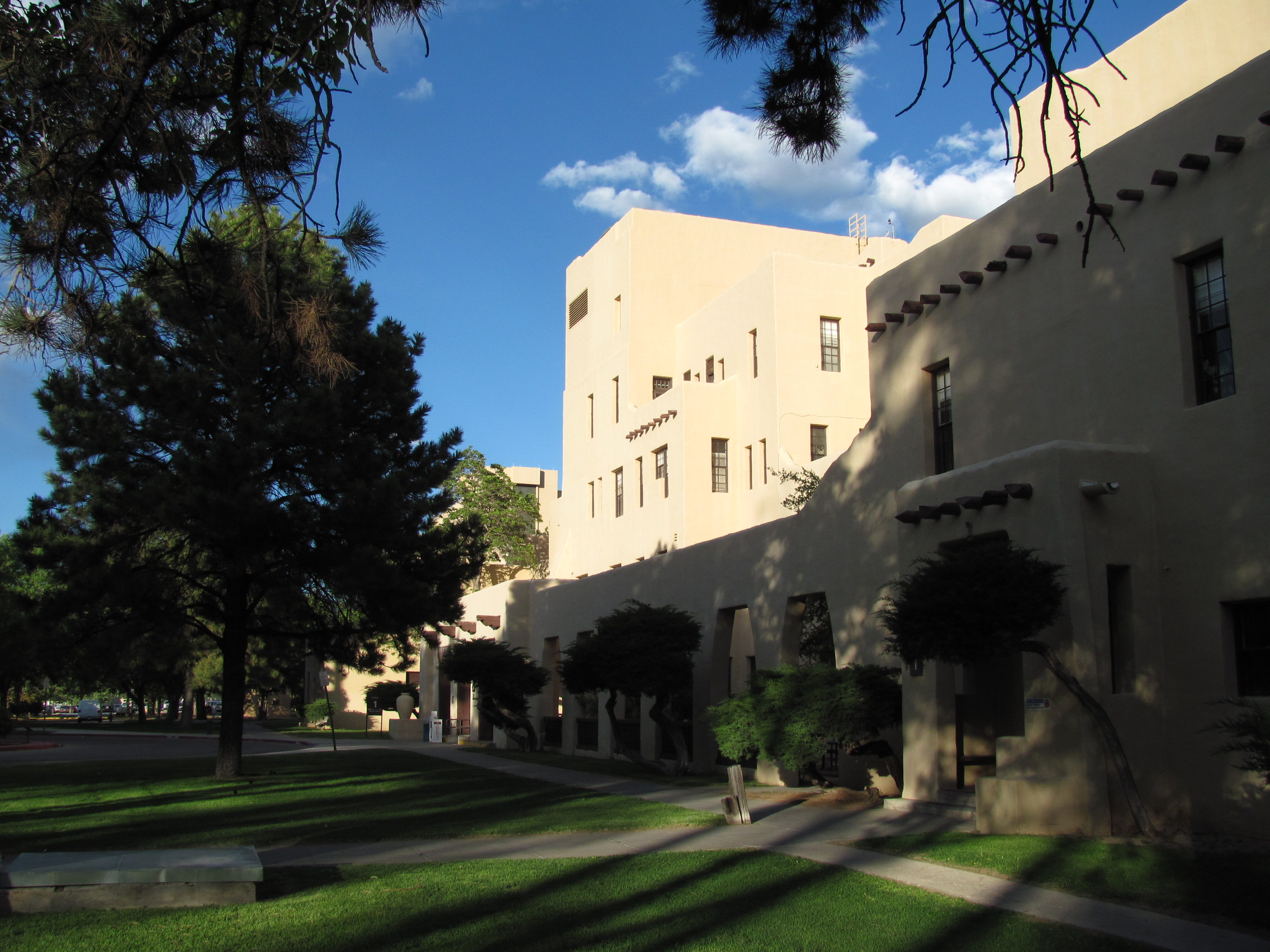

- Location within New Mexico Location within the United States
- Location: 2100 Ridgecrest, SE, Albuquerque, New Mexico
- Area: 40 acres (16 ha)
- Built: 1932
- Architectural style: Spanish-Pueblo Revival
- MPS: United States Second Generation Veterans Hospitals MPS
- NRHP reference No.: 83001614
- Added to NRHP: August 19, 1983

The Albuquerque Veterans Administration Medical Center, at 2100 Ridgecrest, SE, in Albuquerque, New Mexico, was built in 1932. It was listed on the National Register of Historic Places in 1983. The listing included 16 contributing buildings and a contributing structure on 40 acres (16 ha).

It was built in a combination of Spanish Revival architecture and Pueblo Revival architecture styles.

Its National Register nomination states:

Building 1 is asymetrical with box-like massing. It steps up in terraces, varying in height from one to four stories. A five story tower rises off-center of the main entrance, which consists of three portals surrounded by roughly hewn lintels and columns. The ceiling of the Main Lobby is finished in beautifully hand carved wood beams or vigas that are decoratively painted revealing the Indian motifs. These still remain. Building 2 features two rounded bell towers with battered walls on either side of the entry, giving the structure a resemblance to a pueblo church. Buildings 1, 2, 3, 4, and the quarters have pueblo and Spanish details such as timber framed porches, decorated corbels and lintel beams, vigas, patio gardens and pueblo style arcades, often randomly placed at the upper levels (in the case of buildings 3 & 4). Straight headed windows are set deep into the walls. The engineering support buildings are plainer with less detailing but their scale, massing, finish materials and minimal details are the same as the main

buildings.

It was listed in conformance with a 2011 study of veterans hospitals nationwide.
