= Buddy Brothers =

American football coach (1909–1991)

Biographical details
- Born: May 29, 1909
- Died: December 25, 1991 (aged 82); Oklahoma, U.S.

Playing career
- 1928–1930: Texas Tech

Coaching career (HC unless noted)
- 1941–1945: Tulsa (backfield)
- 1946–1952: Tulsa

Head coaching record
- Overall: 45–25–4

Accomplishments and honors

Championships
- 4 MVC (1946–1947, 1950–1951)

Awards
- 2× MVC Coach of the Year (1950–1951)

John Orville "Buddy" Brothers (May 29, 1909 – December 25, 1991) was an American college football coach. He coached the Tulsa Golden Hurricane football team at the University of Tulsa from 1946 to 1952 and compiled a 45–25–4 record and .635 winning percentage.

== Coaching career ==
Brothers attended Texas Tech University, where he played on the football team from 1928 to 1930. Brothers coached at Tulsa for seven seasons. During that time, his teams compiled four Missouri Valley Conference championship, and Brothers was twice named the conference Coach of the Year. He posted a 45–25–4 record and .635 winning percentage, which makes him the ninth winningest Tulsa coach in school history.

In 1946, Brothers and quarterback Clyde LeForce led the Golden Hurricane to a 9–1 record. Tulsa recorded impressive wins over Texas Tech, Cincinnati, and conference co-champions Arkansas and Kansas. The Golden Hurricane beat Kansas, 56–0, after scoring five touchdowns in the first half within a 12-minute span. The lone loss came to Detroit.

In 1949, Tulsa posted just a 5–5–1 record, but that included one of the biggest upsets of the season. The Golden Hurricane beat undefeated Villanova, 21–19, a team that had recorded earlier wins over Texas A&M, Penn State, Detroit, and Saint Mary's. After the game, Brothers told the media, "You know, we've had one coming to us for a long time. I guess this was it. We hadn't been doing much and Villanova was bigger, faster and a sound favorite. "But a half dozen of the boys came to me this afternoon. They said they were speaking for the team when they told me: "'We're gonna win this one for you, coach, just to make you coach of the week'."

In 1951, in the game against Marquette, the opposing coach, Lisle Blackbourn, accused the Golden Hurricane of "flagrantly illegal tactics." Brothers called the charges "unfair, unsportsmanlike, and onesided." The incident created enough ill will that the schools cancelled the 1952 game.

After the end of his coaching tenure at Tulsa, Brothers went on to coach high school football including stints at Norman High School, in 1956 and 1957, and Lubbock High School.

== Head coaching record ==
| Year | Team | Overall | Conference | Standing | Bowl/playoffs | AP^{#} |
|---|---|---|---|---|---|---|
Tulsa Golden Hurricane (Missouri Valley Conference) (1946–1952)
| 1946 | Tulsa | 9–1 | 3–0 | 1st | | 17 |
| 1947 | Tulsa | 5–5 | 3–0 | 1st | | |
| 1948 | Tulsa | 0–9–1 | 0–1–1 | 4th | | |
| 1949 | Tulsa | 5–5–1 | 1–2–1 | 5th | | |
| 1950 | Tulsa | 9–1–1 | 3–0–1 | 1st | | 19 |
| 1951 | Tulsa | 9–2 | 4–0 | 1st | | |
| 1952 | Tulsa | 8–2–1 | 3–1 | 2nd | L Gator | 12 |
| Tulsa: | | 45–25–4 | 17–4–3 | | | |
| Total: | | 45–25–4 | | | | |
National championship Conference title Conference division title or championship game berth
^{#}Rankings from final AP Poll.
