= Chet Benefiel =

American football and basketball coach (1907–1994)

- Benefiel, 1930

Biographical details
- Born: March 8, 1907; Montgomery County, Kansas, U.S.
- Died: November 24, 1994 (aged 87); Houston, Texas, U.S.

Playing career

Football
- 1928–1931: Tulsa
- Position: Halfback

Coaching career (HC unless noted)

Football
- 1936–1938: Tulsa (assistant)
- 1939–1940: Tulsa

Basketball
- 1932–1939: Tulsa

Head coaching record
- Overall: 11–8–1 (football); 65–65 (basketball)

Accomplishments and honors

Championships
- Football; 1 MVC (1940)

Chester James Benefiel (March 8, 1907 – November 24, 1994) was an American college football and college basketball coach. He played fullback for the Tulsa football team from 1928 to 1931 before becoming a coach. He was the head basketball coach for the University of Tulsa from 1932 to 1939, compiling a 65–65 record. He was also the head coach of the Tulsa Golden Hurricane football team during the 1939 and 1940 seasons, compiling an 11–8–1 record. He resigned in December 1940. In 1942, he was awarded a commission in the United States Navy.

== Head coaching record ==
=== Men's basketball ===
Record table
Season	Team	Overall	Conference	Standing	Postseason
Tulsa Golden Hurricane (Independent) (1932–1934)
1932–33	Tulsa	11–6			
1933–34	Tulsa	6–8			
Tulsa Golden Hurricane (Missouri Valley Conference) (1934–1939)
1934–35	Tulsa	6–10	3–9	7th	
1935–36	Tulsa	6–14	3–9	T–6th	
1936–37	Tulsa	9–9	4–8	5th	
1937–38	Tulsa	12–10	8–6	3rd	
1938–39	Tulsa	15–8	8–6	T–3rd	
Tulsa:		65–65 (.500)	26–32 (.448)		
Total:		65–65 (.500)			

=== Football ===
Year	Team	Overall	Conference	Standing	Bowl/playoffs
Tulsa Golden Hurricane (Missouri Valley Conference) (1939–1940)
1939	Tulsa	4–5–1	2–1–1	3rd	
1940	Tulsa	7–3	4–0	1st	
Tulsa:		11–8–1	6–1–1		
Total:		11–8–1			
National championship Conference title Conference division title or championship game berth
