= David Rader =

American football coach and politician (born 1957)

Dave Rader
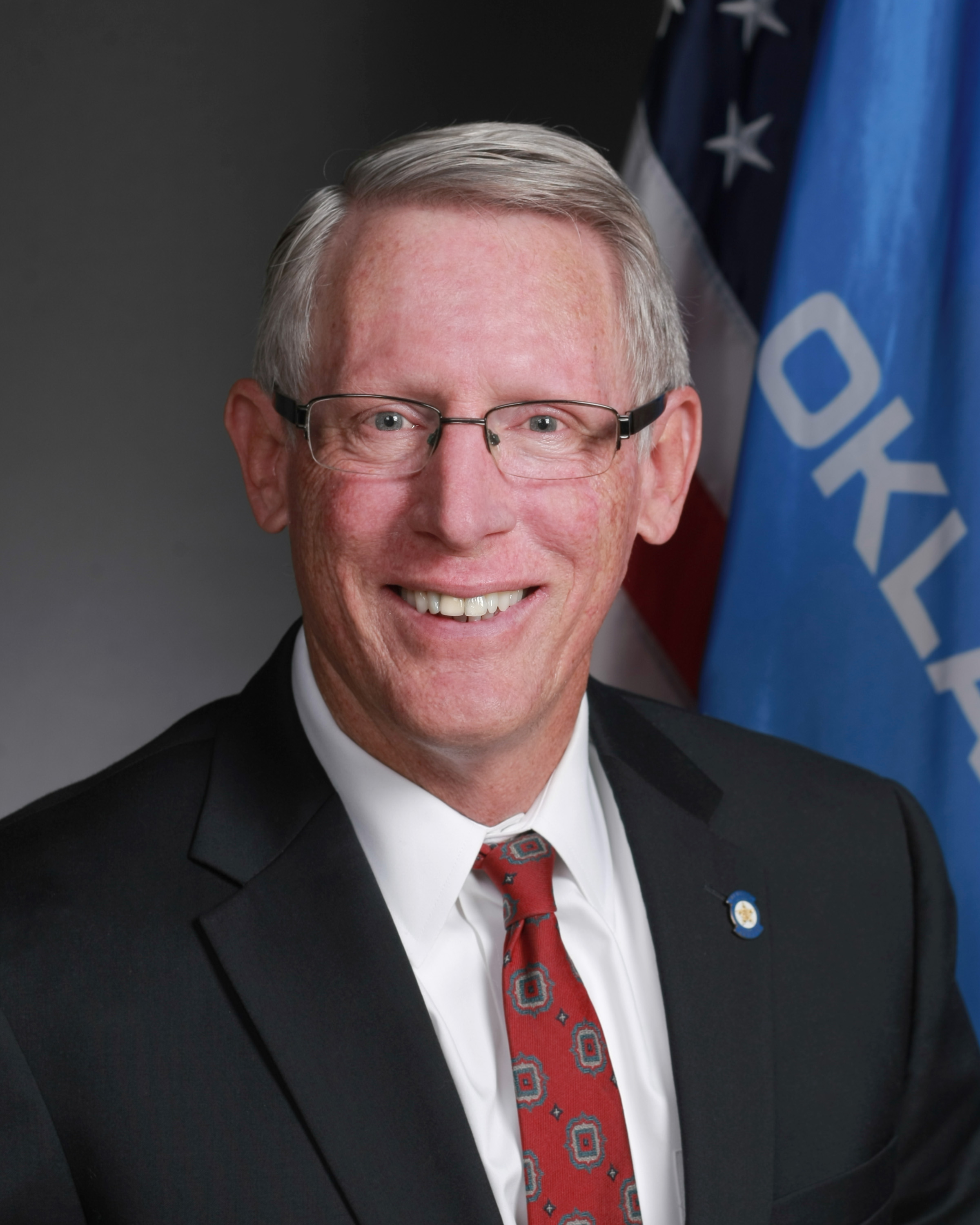

Member of the Oklahoma Senate from the 39th district
- Incumbent
- Assumed office January 2017
- Preceded by: Brian Crain

Personal details
- Born: March 9, 1957 (age 69) Wichita, Kansas, U.S.
- Party: Republican
- Education: University of Tulsa (BS)
- Coaching career

Playing career
- 1975–1978: Tulsa
- 1979: New York Giants
- Position: Quarterback

Coaching career (HC unless noted)
- 1983–1985: Alabama (QB/WR)
- 1986: Mississippi State (OC/OB)
- 1987: Tulsa (AHC/QB)
- 1988–1999: Tulsa
- 2003–2006: Alabama (OC/QB)
- 2010: Ole Miss (co-OC/QB)

Head coaching record
- Overall: 49–80–1
- Bowls: 1–1

David Rader (born March 9, 1957) is an American legislator and former football player and coach. He has been a member of the Oklahoma State Senate since 2017. Rader served as the head football coach at the University of Tulsa from 1988 to 1999, compiling a record of 49–80–1.

== Playing career ==
Rader graduated from Will Rogers High School in Tulsa, Oklahoma, then attended the University of Tulsa, from which he graduated with a Bachelor of Science in mechanical engineering in 1978 after serving as the starting quarterback for the Golden Hurricane in 1977 and 1978. While at TU, Rader was a quarterback and part of the 1976 Independence Bowl team. He was the starting QB in 1977 but was injured in the third game. For the 1978 season, he started all 11 games for a 9–2 record.

Rader was an 11th round pick (295th overall) in the 1979 NFL draft by the San Diego Chargers and was later picked up by the New York Giants.

== Coaching career ==
Rader coached at the University of Alabama as an offensive assistant from 1983 to 1985 and then again as the co-offensive coordinator and quarterbacks coach from 2004 to 2006 under head coach Mike Shula. On February 1, 2010, Rader was hired as the co-offensive coordinator and quarterbacks coach for the Ole Miss Rebels football team after the departure of Kent Austin. Ole Miss did not retain Rader for the 2011 season. Between roles at these SEC schools he was also the head coach for his alma mater, Tulsa, starting in 1988 at age 31 – the youngest head coach in NCAA Division 1 at that time. Rader served as head coach until 1999, coaching the most games in TU history. In 2008, Rader received the Merve Johnson Integrity in Coaching Award. In 2011, his book Missing Page from the Playbook – Fundamentals Behind the Physical, Mental, and Emotional Elements of Commitment was published.

== Political career ==
Rader was elected to the Oklahoma State Senate on November 8, 2016. He serves the 39th Senate District. Dave was first elected to the Oklahoma State Senate in November 2016 and re-elected in November 2020. He presently serves as chair to the Senate Republican Caucus, as well as vice chair to the Appropriations Committee and Select Committee on Redistricting. He sits on the Finance Committee, Public Safety Committee, and Energy Committee. In addition, Dave is a member of the Appropriations Subcommittee on Health and Human Services. On January 6, 2021, Rader was selected to succeed Jason Smalley as Senate majority caucus chair, after having been caucus vice chair since January 3, 2019 (to which he was succeeded by Greg McCortney).

In 2023 he co-authored House Bill 1792 with Mike Osburn that would lessen the penalties of dogfighting in the state of Oklahoma, which sparked pushback from animal rights advocates. Also in 2023, Lonnie Paxton authored Senate Bill 1006 which died in the Senate. It would have also lessened the penalties for cockfighting in the state, similar to House Bill 2530, authored by Justin Humphrey and Paxton, which also died in the same timeframe.

== Personal information ==
Rader is married to his wife, Janet, and with her has three children: sons Daniel and Jordan and daughter Kendal. In 1989 Rader was inducted into the Will Rogers High School Hall of Fame. Rader graduated with the class of 1975. Rader has nine grandchildren.

== Head coaching record ==
Year	Team	Overall	Conference	Standing	Bowl/playoffs	Coaches^{#}	AP^{°}
Tulsa Golden Hurricane (NCAA Division I-A independent) (1987–1995)
1988	Tulsa	4–7					
1989	Tulsa	6–6			L Independence		
1990	Tulsa	3–8					
1991	Tulsa	10–2			W Freedom	21	21
1992	Tulsa	4–7					
1993	Tulsa	4–6–1					
1994	Tulsa	3–8					
1995	Tulsa	4–7					
Tulsa Golden Hurricane (Western Athletic Conference) (1996–1999)
1996	Tulsa	4–7	2–6	6th (Mountain)			
1997	Tulsa	2–9	2–6	6th (Mountain)			
1998	Tulsa	4–7	2–6	6th (Mountain)			
1999	Tulsa	1–6*	0–4				
Tulsa:		49–80–1	6–22	* Fired after seven games in 1999			
Total:		49–80–1					
^{#}Rankings from final Coaches Poll.; ^{°}Rankings from final AP Poll.
