= Tulsa Golden Hurricane football =

American football team in Oklahoma

2026 Tulsa Golden Hurricane football team
- First season: 1895; 131 years ago
- Athletic director: Justin Moore
- Head coach: Tre Lamb; 2nd season, 7–11 (.389)
- Location: Tulsa, Oklahoma
- Stadium: Skelly Field at H. A. Chapman Stadium (capacity: 30,000)
- NCAA division: Division I FBS
- Conference: American
- Colors: Crimson, royal blue, and old gold
- All-time record: 654–551–27 (.542)
- Bowl record: 11–12 (.478)

Conference championships
- OCC: 1916, 1919, 1920, 1922, 1925 Big Four: 1929, 1930, 1932 MVC: 1935, 1936, 1937, 1938, 1940, 1941, 1942, 1943, 1946, 1947, 1950, 1951, 1962, 1965, 1966, 1973, 1974, 1975, 1976, 1980, 1981, 1982, 1983, 1984, 1985 C-USA: 2005, 2012
- Consensus All-Americans: 3
- Rivalries: Oklahoma State (rivalry); Rice
- Fight song: Hurricane Spirit
- Mascot: Gus T.
- Marching band: The Sound of the Golden Hurricane
- Outfitter: Adidas
- Website: tulsahurricane.com

The Tulsa Golden Hurricane football program represents the University of Tulsa in college football at the NCAA Division I Football Bowl Subdivision (FBS) level. Tulsa has competed in the American Conference (The American) since the 2014 season and was previously a member of Conference USA (C-USA). The team is led by head coach Tre Lamb. Tulsa plays its home games at Skelly Field at H. A. Chapman Stadium in Tulsa, Oklahoma. The University of Tulsa has the smallest undergraduate enrollment of all schools that participate at the FBS level.

== History ==
=== Early history (1895–1976) ===
Tulsa was known as Henry Kendall College until the move from Muskogee to Tulsa was completed in 1907. It was during this time that the first football team would represent the university. The team would go 1–0, defeating the Bacone Indians. Both the exact date and score of the game were not recorded. Over the next 12 years, Kendall would play 17 games, going 8–8–1, but not fielding a team for four years (1903, 1904, 1906, 1907). The most common opponent was Arkansas, who met with Tulsa four times. Now established in Tulsa, the football team began to grow. In 1913, Kendall went 5–2 under George Evans. Sam P. McBirney, who coached the 2–3 1908 squad, would then return to coach the team in 1914. His first two years back would both be successful, a 6–2 record in 1914 and 6–1–1 the following year, but the undefeated 1916 squad would bring national recognition to Tulsa. The 1916 Hurricane outscored its opponents 566–40, including an 81–0 defeat of Cumberland (TN) and a 117–0 drubbing of Missouri–Rolla. There were rumors of playing Notre Dame for the Mid-America Championship, but the two teams never met. Kendall College would return to form after World War I, to go 8–0–1 under Francis Schmidt. The new coach was known as Francis "Close the Gates of Mercy" Schmidt because of his efforts to run up the score on inferior teams. Under Schmidt's three-year tenure, Kendall defeated Oklahoma Baptist 152–0, St. Gregory 121–0, and NE Oklahoma 151–0, as well as a 92–0 defeat of East Central Oklahoma and 10 other victories by 60+ points. The 1919 season gave Kendall their first defeat of the Oklahoma Sooners, but a 7–7 tie with Oklahoma A&M would prevent a perfect season. Ultimately, Schmidt's style would cost Tulsa their coach, as he attracted the attention of University of Arkansas boosters with a 63–7 defeat of the Razorbacks in 1919. Schmidt would sign with and coach the Hogs from 1922 to 1928. Howard Acher would leave his mark on the program in two ways. Tulsa did not miss a beat after Schmidt's departure, and went 8–0 in 1922. This included a 13–6 defeat of Schmidt-coached Arkansas in Fayetteville. Acher also gave the newly named University of Tulsa an athletic identity. Previously, the team had been referred to as "Orange and Black", "Kendallites", "Presbyterians", "Tigers", and "Tulsans". Acher put a vote to the team to replace Golden Tornadoes, which belonged to Georgia Tech. The vote resulted in "Golden Hurricane", which it has remained ever since. The coach would not have the staying power of his nickname, however, and was ousted after three years, when he was replaced by Gus Henderson. TU gave Henderson a large contract to leave the USC Trojans and coach the Golden Hurricane. The Hurricane had great success on and off the field under Henderson, going 62–17–3 in his first nine years, winning four Oklahoma Intercollegiate Conference championships. Henderson also played an integral part in building a home for his football team. The team played in McNulty Park, a 90-yard baseball field where the teams had to drive the length of the field before bringing out the ball to the ten yard line and put the ball in the endzone again. This facility shortcoming meant that officials had to make a judgment call whether the player could've scored or not. Many fights resulted from what other schools thought was favoritism by the officials on these calls. Skelly Field, named for oil tycoon William Skelly, was completed in 1930. Tulsa won the first game in the stadium, 26–6 over Arkansas. Tulsa also scored on the first offensive play in the stadium, after Arkansas fumbled the opening kickoff. Henderson brought the University of Tulsa into the Missouri Valley Conference for the 1935 season.

Tulsa signed their 13th head coach, Henry Frnka, who was coaching at a high school in Greenville, Texas. Under Frnka, Tulsa roared through the 1941 season, finishing 7–2 and receiving their first bowl invitation. It was the help of Glenn Dobbs, considered the best player in Tulsa history, that Frnka could take the Hurricane to new heights. Tulsa defeated Texas Tech in the Sun Bowl because of a Glenn Dobbs pass to Sax Judd with little time remaining, the only score of the game. Tulsa improved in 1942, going 10–0, including wins against Oklahoma (23–0), Oklahoma A&M (34–6), and Arkansas (40–7). This netted the Golden Hurricane an invitation to the 1943 Sugar Bowl against Tennessee. Tulsa lost the game and argument for national champion on a late Volunteer touchdown. Tulsa was instead ranked fourth to end the year, the highest in school history. The 1952 Missouri Valley Conference team with its 8–2–1 record climbed to 11th in the AP Poll & was invited to the Gator Bowl, then 1 of only 5 post-season bowl games, although not one of the 4 major ones. In 1955, Tulsa offered Bobby Dobbs the head football coaching job. Bobby accepted and left the Air Force. At Tulsa, he took over a team that had gone 0–11 the previous season. In 1956, Tulsa posted a 7–2–1 record, and in 1958, the team 7–3. These successes prompted Army to consider Bobby as a replacement for Red Blaik, but Dale Hall was given the job instead. Dobbs most significant wins at Tulsa were a 24–16 victory over the undefeated Oklahoma State Cowboys in 1958 and a 17–6 victory over tenth ranked North Texas in 1959. Dobbs compiled a 30–28–2 overall record at Tulsa. Tulsa replaced Bobby Dobbs with his brother, Glenn, in 1961. His teams led the nation in passing for five straight years (1962–1966) and went to the Bluebonnet Bowl in 1964 and 1965. Notable in Tulsa football tradition are the Missouri Valley Conference teams of 1964 and 1965 which compiled records of 9–2 and 8–3 and played in the Bluebonnet Bowl in both years. The passing attack featured Jerry Rhome to Howard Twilley, both of whom achieved lengthy careers in professional football; Rhome polled second in the 1964 Heisman Trophy; Rhome and Twilley are in the College Football Hall of Fame. Steve Largent was another talented Tulsa receiver who graduated to a long NFL career (1976–1989 Seattle), was inducted into the Pro Football Hall of Fame because of numerous enduring records as a receiver, served in the U.S. House of Representatives from 1994 to 2002, and then ran as one of the two major candidates for Governor of Oklahoma in 2002. The Golden Hurricane won 25 Missouri Valley conference football titles the most of any school that competed in that league. Tulsa was the only team to play in five consecutive New Year's Day bowl games. The Golden Hurricane also was handed one of the worst defeats in college football history when they were beaten in regular season play by Houston Cougars 100–6 on November 23, 1968. Dr. Phil McGraw played for TU at the time. Vince Carillot succeeded Dobbs as head coach. However, he resigned after only one season, a 1–9 campaign in 1969, after an NCAA probe into possible infractions that occurred under his watch.

In July 1970, Claude Gibson was elevated to interim head coach when Golden Hurricane coach Vince Carillot resigned. When Gibson's Tulsa squad started the season 4–1, which included a stunning upset of Memphis, a team Tulsa had not beaten in six years, the interim label was removed. His first Golden Hurricane team finished 6–4. However, a 4–7 record in 1971 and a 1–5 start to the 1972 season did him in, as he was fired. F. A. Dry was donned the interim tag when Gibson was fired, and a 3–2 finish to the 1972 season earned him the permanent head coaching position. Dry's Hurricane compiled records of 6–5 in 1973, 8–3 in 1974, 7–4 in 1975, and 7–4–1 in 1976 for a total of 31–18–1. Dry departed Tulsa after the 1976 season to accept the head football coach position at TCU.

=== John Cooper era (1977–1984) ===
In 1977, John Cooper was named the head football coach at Tulsa. At Tulsa, he compiled a 56–32 record with five Missouri Valley Conference titles. Cooper considers his tenure at Tulsa his "most enjoyable years as a coach". For most of his tenure, Tulsa had trouble attracting enough fans to meet the minimum requirements to stay in Division I-A, and were forced to pad their gates. While they claimed to have attracted over 35,000 people per game, the actual average attendance was closer to 17,000. Cooper departed Tulsa after the 1984 season to accept the position of head football coach at Arizona State.

=== Don Morton era (1985–1986) ===
North Dakota State head coach Don Morton was hired to replace Cooper in 1985. Under Morton's tutelage, the Hurricane compiled a record of 13–9. The Missouri Valley dropped football after the 1985 season. Tulsa, by this time the MVC's only Division I-A member in football, became an independent. Morton left Tulsa after two seasons to accept the head football coach position at Wisconsin. On November 2, 1985, Tulsa became the first NCAA football team to get two 200-yard rushing performances from two running backs in the same game. Gordon Brown rushed for 214 yards, and Steve Gage rushed for 206 in a 42–26 win over Wichita State.

=== George Henshaw era (1987) ===
Alabama offensive coordinator and offensive line coach George Henshaw was selected as Morton's replacement. Henshaw would only stick around for one season, a 3–8 campaign in 1987, before departing to accept the position of offensive line coach for the NFL's Denver Broncos, leaving the Hurricane to search for their third head coach in four years.

=== David Rader era (1988–1999) ===
David Rader was promoted from quarterbacks coach and associate head coach to replace Henshaw. Rader led Tulsa to a school-record 10 wins and finished ranked No. 21 in the AP poll in 1991, but it turned out to be the school's last hurrah for more than a decade. According to Rader, school officials dropped health/PE as a major early in the 1990s; at one point, 56 percent of the players were health/PE majors. Combined with an aging Skelly Stadium, this made it difficult to attract competitive players. Rader never won more than four games in a season again, and was fired midway through the 1999 season. Tulsa joined the Western Athletic Conference in 1996, becoming that 16-team league's easternmost member at the time.

=== Keith Burns era (2000–2002) ===
Arkansas defensive coordinator Keith Burns was hired to replace Rader in 2000. Burns' Hurricane struggled mightily, and he resigned under pressure after three seasons and a 7–28 record.

=== Steve Kragthorpe era (2003–2006) ===
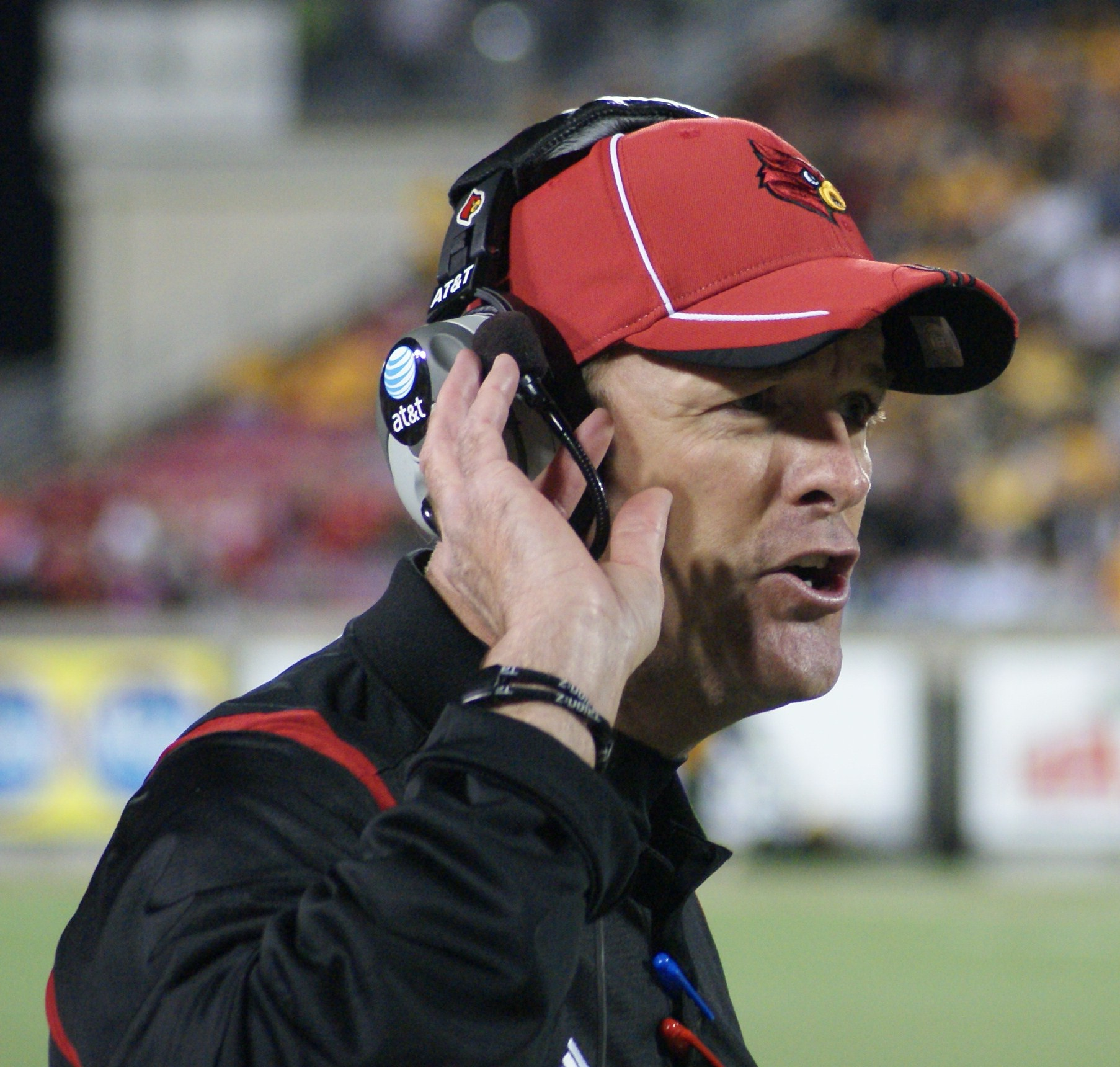
Coach Kragthorpe

Steve Kragthorpe was hired to replace Burns as Golden Hurricanes head coach in 2003. In his first season at Tulsa, Kragthorpe guided a program that had won just two games during the previous two seasons to an 8–5 record and its first bowl game appearance since 1991. In 2005, Tulsa won the Conference USA championship and then went on to beat Fresno State in the AutoZone Liberty Bowl. Kragthorpe left Tulsa after four seasons to accept the head coaching position at Louisville.

=== Todd Graham era (2007–2010) ===
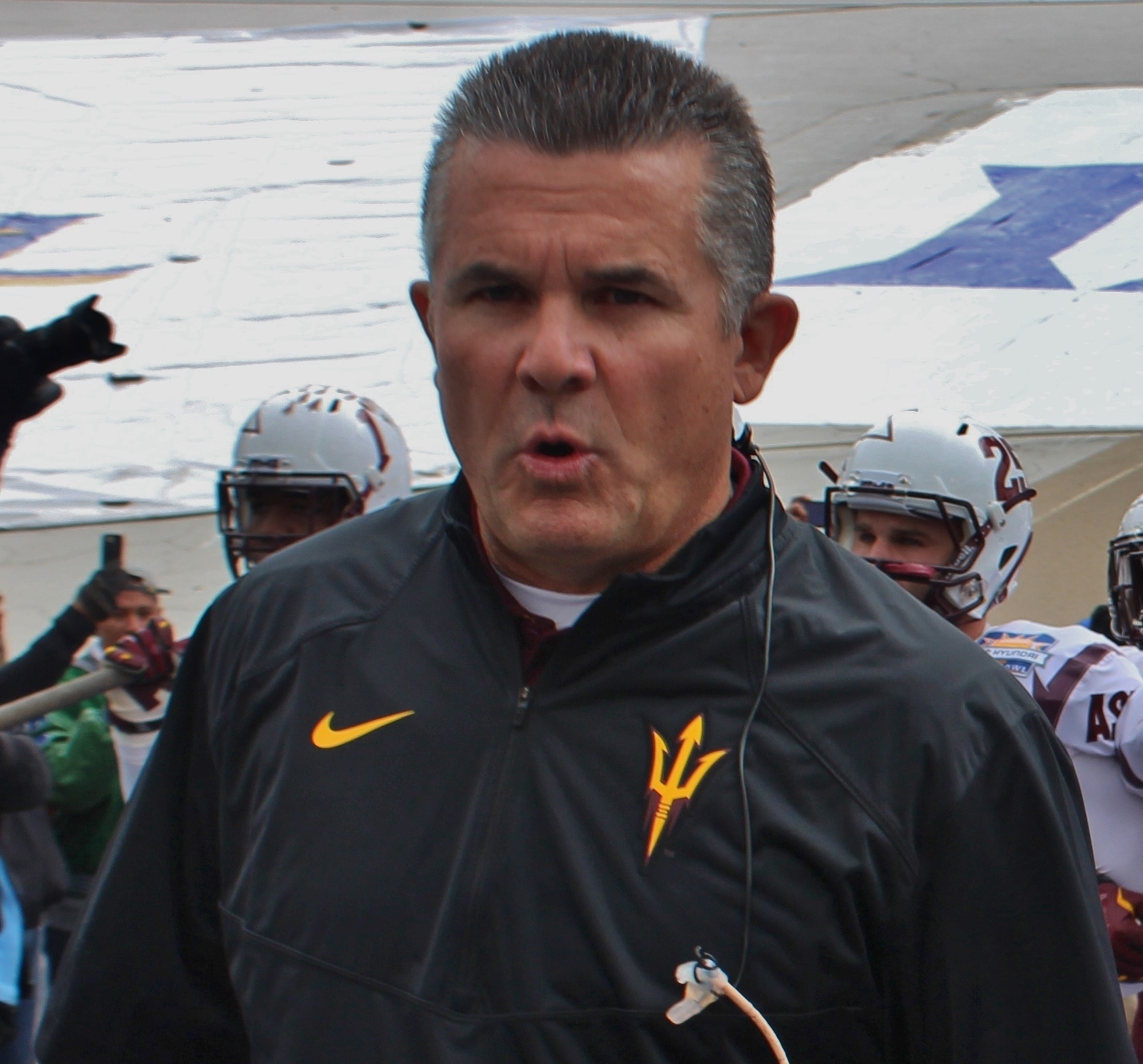
Coach Graham

When the Tulsa head coaching position was vacant following the 2002 season, Todd Graham sent in his application. But it was not until five years later, when Steve Kragthorpe left for Louisville, that Graham would take over the reins as the Golden Hurricane head coach. After serving three years as Tulsa defensive coordinator and one year as Rice head coach, Graham was introduced as Tulsa's 27th head football coach on January 12, 2007. With an annual salary of $1.1 million Graham was the second highest-paid coach in Conference USA, behind SMU's June Jones in 2010. For his offensive coordinators, Graham turned to his good friend Gus Malzahn, then offensive coordinator at Arkansas, as well as then WVU tight ends coach Herb Hand. He also hired former Tulsa quarterback and Tulsa Union HS coach Bill Blankenship as wide receivers coach. In his final season at Tulsa, the team reached a 10–3 record that included a 28–27 upset at Notre Dame and 62–35 win over No. 24-ranked Hawaii in the 2010 Hawaii Bowl. Graham left Tulsa after four seasons to accept the head football coach position at Pittsburgh.

=== Bill Blankenship era (2011–2014) ===
After a brief search, former Golden Hurricane quarterback Bill Blankenship was named Tulsa's new head coach on January 14, 2011, receiving a promotion from special teams coordinator, wide receivers and running backs coach. Blankenship's first two seasons as head coach were marked by success, including a conference championship and Liberty Bowl victory in 2012. But over the next two seasons, Tulsa won a total of only five games, and Tulsa fired Blankenship on December 1, 2014. On April 2, 2013, Tulsa announced that in July 2014 it would leave C-USA for the league then known as the Big East Conference. The following day, the conference announced its new name of the American Athletic Conference, which took effect once the non-FBS schools broke from the league and formed a new Big East Conference.

=== Philip Montgomery era (2015–2022) ===
Baylor offensive coordinator Philip Montgomery accepted an offer from Tulsa to become their head coach on December 11, 2014. Montgomery brought with him an exciting, up-tempo, pass-oriented spread offense he helped install as offensive coordinator at Houston and Baylor under head coach Art Briles. In Montgomery's first season at the helm, the Golden Hurricane improved to 6–7, with a loss in the Independence Bowl to cap the year. In Montgomery's second season, Tulsa finished 10–3, but fell to 2–10 in 2017. Montgomery was fired following the 2022 season.

=== Kevin Wilson (2023–2024) ===
Following the dismissal of Montgomery, Tulsa announced that they had hired Ohio State offensive coordinator and former Indiana head coach Kevin Wilson as the program's next head coach. Wilson was terminated after a losing season his first year and after several bad losses his second year. He was replaced by interim coach Ryan Switzer.

== Conference affiliations ==
Tulsa has been a member of the following conferences.

- Independent (1895–1913)
- Oklahoma Intercollegiate Conference (1914–1928)
- Big Four Conference (1929–1932)
- Missouri Valley Conference (1935–1985)
- Independent (1986–1995)
- Western Athletic Conference (1996–2004)
- Conference USA (2005–2013)
- American Conference (2014–present)

== Championships ==
=== Conference championships ===
Tulsa has won 35 conference championships, 29 outright and 6 shared.

Year	Coach	Conference	Overall Record	Conference Record
1916	Sam P. McBirney	Oklahoma Collegiate Conference	10–0	4–0
1919	Francis Schmidt	Oklahoma Collegiate Conference	8–0–1	5–0–1
1920	Francis Schmidt	Oklahoma Collegiate Conference	10–0–1	6–0–1
1922	Howard Acher	Oklahoma Collegiate Conference	8–1	4–0
1925	Gus Henderson	Oklahoma Collegiate Conference	6–2	4–0
1929	Gus Henderson	Big Four Conference	6–3–1	4–0–1
1930	Gus Henderson	Big Four Conference	7–2	3–0
1932	Gus Henderson	Big Four Conference	7–1–1	3–0
1935 †	Gus Henderson	Missouri Valley Conference	3–6–1	3–0
1936 †	Vic Hurt	Missouri Valley Conference	5–2–2	3–0
1937	Vic Hurt	Missouri Valley Conference	6–2–2	3–0
1938	Vic Hurt	Missouri Valley Conference	4–5–1	3–1
1940	Chet Benefiel	Missouri Valley Conference	7–3	4–0
1941	Henry Frnka	Missouri Valley Conference	8–2	4–0
1942	Henry Frnka	Missouri Valley Conference	10–1	5–0
1943	Henry Frnka	Missouri Valley Conference	6–1–1	1–0
1946	Buddy Brothers	Missouri Valley Conference	9–1	3–0
1947	Buddy Brothers	Missouri Valley Conference	5–5	3–0
1950	Buddy Brothers	Missouri Valley Conference	9–1–1	3–0–1
1951	Buddy Brothers	Missouri Valley Conference	9–2	4–0
1962	Glenn Dobbs	Missouri Valley Conference	5–5	3–0
1965	Glenn Dobbs	Missouri Valley Conference	8–3	4–0
1966 †	Glenn Dobbs	Missouri Valley Conference	6–4	3–1
1973 †	F. A. Dry	Missouri Valley Conference	6–5	5–1
1974	F. A. Dry	Missouri Valley Conference	8–3	6–0
1975	F. A. Dry	Missouri Valley Conference	7–4	4–0
1976 †	F. A. Dry	Missouri Valley Conference	7–4–1	2–1–1
1980	John Cooper	Missouri Valley Conference	8–3	4–1
1981 †	John Cooper	Missouri Valley Conference	6–5	5–1
1982	John Cooper	Missouri Valley Conference	10–1	6–0
1983	John Cooper	Missouri Valley Conference	8–3	5–0
1984	John Cooper	Missouri Valley Conference	6–5	5–0
1985	Don Morton	Missouri Valley Conference	6–5	3–0
2005	Steve Kragthorpe	Conference USA	9–4	6–2
2012	Bill Blankenship	Conference USA	11–3	7–1

† Co-champions

=== Division championships ===
Tulsa has won the following division championships.

Year	Division	Coach	Opponent	CG result
2005	Conference USA – West	Steve Kragthorpe	UCF	W 44–27
2007	Conference USA – West	Todd Graham	UCF	L 25–44
2008	Conference USA – West	Todd Graham	ECU	L 24–27
2010 †	Conference USA – West	Todd Graham	N/A lost tiebreaker to SMU	
2012	Conference USA – West	Bill Blankenship	UCF	W 33–27 ^{OT}
2020	AAC – runner-up	Philip Montgomery	Cincinnati	L 24–27

† Co-champions

== Head coaches ==
This is a list of the head coaches of Tulsa.

Name	Seasons	Overall	Pct.
Norman Leard	1895–1897	5–2	.714
Fred Taylor	1898–1899	1–1–1	.500
Sam P. McBirney	1908, 1914–1916	25–6–1	.806
Harvey L. Allen	1912	1–3	.250
George "Red" Evans	1913	5–2	.714
Hal Mefford	1917	0–8–1	.000
Arthur F. Smith	1918	1–2	.333
Francis Schmidt	1919–1921	24–3–2	.889
Howard Acher	1922–1924	12–11–2	.522
Gus Henderson	1925–1935	70–25–5	.737
Vic Hurt	1936–1938	15–9–5	.625
Chet Benefiel	1939–1940	11–8–1	.589
Henry Frnka	1941–1945	40–9–1	.816
Buddy Brothers	1946–1952	45–25–4	.635
Bernie Witucki	1953–1954	3–18	.143
Bobby Dobbs	1955–1960	30–28–2	.517
Glenn Dobbs	1961–1968	45–37	.549
Vince Carillot	1969	1–9	.100
Claude "Hoot" Gibson	1970–1972	11–16	.407
F. A. Dry	1972–1976	31–18–1	.633
John Cooper	1977–1984	57–31–1	.648
Don Morton	1985–1986	13–9	.591
George Henshaw	1987	3–8	.273
Dave Rader	1988–1999	49–80–1	.376
Pat Henderson	1999	1–3	.250
Keith Burns	2000–2002	7–28	.200
Steve Kragthorpe	2003–2006	29–22	.569
Todd Graham	2007–2010	35–17	.673
Bill Blankenship	2011–2014	24–27	.471
Philip Montgomery	2015–2022	43–53	.448
Kevin Wilson	2023–2024	4–8	.333

== Bowl games ==
Tulsa has competed in 23 bowl games as of the conclusion of the 2021 season, garnering a record of 11–12.

Season	Coach	Bowl	Opponent	Result
1941	Henry Frnka	Sun	Texas Tech	W 6–0
1942	Henry Frnka	Sugar †	Tennessee	L 7–14
1943	Henry Frnka	Sugar †	Georgia Tech	L 18–20
1944	Henry Frnka	Orange †	Georgia Tech	W 26–12
1945	Henry Frnka	Oil	Georgia	L 6–20
1952	Buddy Brothers	Gator	Florida	L 13–14
1964	Glenn Dobbs	Bluebonnet	Mississippi	W 14–7
1965	Glenn Dobbs	Bluebonnet	Tennessee	L 6–27
1976	F. A. Dry	Independence	McNeese State	L 16–20
1989	David Rader	Independence	Oregon	L 24–27
1991	David Rader	Freedom	San Diego St.	W 28–17
2003	Steve Kragthorpe	Humanitarian	Georgia Tech	L 10–52
2005	Steve Kragthorpe	Liberty	Fresno State	W 31–24
2006	Steve Kragthorpe	Armed Forces	Utah	L 13–25
2007	Todd Graham	GMAC	Bowling Green	W 63–7
2008	Todd Graham	GMAC	Ball State	W 45–13
2010	Todd Graham	Hawaii	Hawaii	W 62–35
2011	Bill Blankenship	Armed Forces	BYU	L 21–24
2012	Bill Blankenship	Liberty	Iowa State	W 31–17
2015	Philip Montgomery	Independence	Virginia Tech	L 52–55
2016	Philip Montgomery	Miami Beach	Central Michigan	W 55–10
2020	Philip Montgomery	Armed Forces	Mississippi State	L 26–28
2021	Philip Montgomery	Myrtle Beach Bowl	Old Dominion	W 30–17

† New Year's Six

== Retired numbers ==
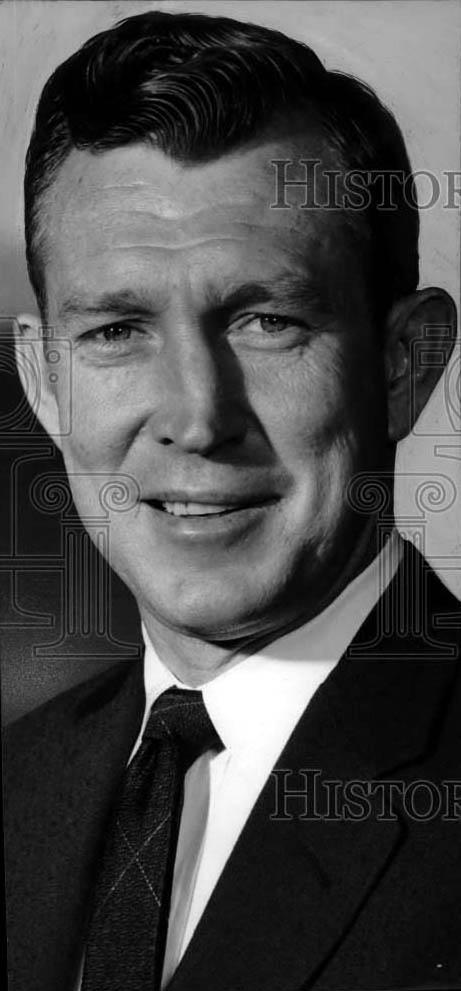
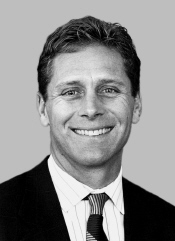
Glenn Dobbs (left) and Steve Largent have their numbers 45 and 83 retired by Tulsa

Tulsa Golden Hurricane retired numbers
No.	Player	Pos.	Tenure	No. ret.	Ref.
14	Billy Anderson	QB	1962–1964 (Note: He had previously played for SMU Mustangs (1960–1961).)	1995	
17	Jerry Rhome	QB	1963–1964		
31	Ellis Jones	G/LB	1942–1944		
36	Felto Prewitt	C	1943–1945		
45	Glenn Dobbs	HB	1940–1942		
55	Jerry Ostroski	G	1988–1991	2018	
64	Marv Matuszak	LB	1952		
81	Howard Twilley	WR	1963–1965		
83	Steve Largent	WR	1972–1975	2008	

== Future non-conference opponents ==
Announced schedules as of November 11, 2026.

2027	2028	2029	2030	2031	2032	2033	2034
Arkansas	Oklahoma State	at Oklahoma State	at Oklahoma	Sam Houston	at Missouri State	at Oklahoma	New Mexico State
Texas Southern	at Louisiana	at Arkansas	Missouri State	at Oklahoma State	Louisiana–Monroe		Toledo
at Oklahoma State	at Louisiana–Monroe	Louisiana Tech	Oklahoma State	Louisiana Tech	at Oregon State		
at Louisiana Tech							

== Bibliography ==
- ESPN, (television network) (2005). ESPN College Football Encyclopedia. ISBN 1-4013-3703-1. OCLC 61264858.
- Bonham, Chad (2004). Golden Hurricane Football at the University of Tulsa, Ok: At the University of Tulsa. ISBN 0-7385-3274-6. OCLC 56948322.

== See also ==
- American football in the United States
- College football
