= Oklahoma Baptist Bison football =

College football team

- First season: 1910; 116 years ago
- Athletic director: Robert Davenport
- Head coach: Chris Jensen; 11th season, 47–75 (.385)
- Location: Shawnee, Oklahoma
- Stadium: Crain Family Stadium (capacity: 4,000)
- NCAA division: Division II
- Conference: Great American
- Colors: Green and gold
- All-time record: 162–165–17 (.496)
- Bowl record: 1–0 (1.000)

Conference championships
- 2
- Rivalries: Southern Nazarene
- Mascot: Bison
- Website: obubison.com/football

The Oklahoma Baptist Bison football team represents Oklahoma Baptist University in college football at the NCAA Division II level. The Bison are members of the Great American Conference (GAC), fielding its team in the GAC since 2013. The team plays home games at Crain Family Stadium in Shawnee, Oklahoma.

Oklahoma Baptist's head coach is Chris Jensen, who took over the position for the 2013 season when the school revived its football program for the first time since 1940.

== Conference affiliations ==
- Independent (1910–1921)
- Oklahoma Intercollegiate Conference (1922–1928)
- Big Four Conference (1929–1932)
- Independent (1933–1935)
- Oklahoma Collegiate Conference (1936–1940)
- Central States Football League (2013–2014)
- Great American Conference (2015–present)

== List of head coaches ==
=== Key ===
Key to symbols in coaches list
General		Overall		Conference		Postseason (Note: Although the first Rose Bowl Game was played in 1902, it has been continuously played since the 1916 game, and is recognized as the oldest bowl game by the NCAA. "—" indicates any season prior to 1916 when postseason games were not played.)	
No.	Order of coaches (Note: A running total of the number of head coaches, with coaches who served separate tenures being counted only once. Interim head coaches are represented with "Int" and are not counted in the running total. "—" indicates the team played but either without a coach or no coach is on record. "X" indicates an interim year without play.)	GC	Games coached	CW	Conference wins	PW	Postseason wins
DC	Division championships	OW	Overall wins	CL	Conference losses	PL	Postseason losses
CC	Conference championships	OL	Overall losses	CT	Conference ties	PT	Postseason ties
NC	National championships	OT	Overall ties (Note: Overtime rules in college football were introduced in 1996, making ties impossible in the period since.)	C%	Conference winning percentage		
†	Elected to the College Football Hall of Fame	O%	Overall winning percentage (Note: When computing the win–loss percentage, a tie counts as half a win and half a loss.)				

=== Coaches ===
List of head football coaches showing season(s) coached, overall records and conference records
No.	Name	Season(s)	GC	OW	OL	OT	O%	CW	CL	CT	C%
1	Robert E. Kennedy	1910	–	–	–	–	–	–	–	–	–
2	Clyde Becker	1911	6	1	4	1	0.250	–	–	–	–
3	William L. Clark	1915	3	0	3	0	.000	–	–	–	–
4	Bill Smith	1916	5	1	3	1	0.300	–	–	–	–
5	Unknown	1918	1	0	1	0	.000	–	–	–	–
6	Oliver Talmage Marston	1919	9	1	7	1	0.167	–	–	–	–
7	Ivan Grove	1920–1921	19	8	10	1	0.447	–	–	–	–
8	Roland E. Lee	1922	10	2	7	1	0.250	1	6	1	0.188
9	Vic Hurt	1923–1929, 1931–1934	99	63	29	7	0.672	30	11	4	0.711
10	Archie W. Butcher	1930	9	4	5	0	0.444	0	3	0	.000
11	Eddie Hurt Jr.	1935–1938	31	17	11	3	0.597	10	4	2	0.688
12	Windy Nicklaus	1939–1940	21	16	4	1	0.786	9	2	1	0.792
13	Chris Jensen	2013–present	122	47	75	0	0.385	39	70	0	0.358

== Year-by-year results ==
National champions	Conference champions	Bowl game berth	Playoff berth

Season	Year	Head coach	Association	Division	Conference	Record							Postseason	Final ranking
Season	Year	Head coach	Association	Division	Conference	Overall			Conference				Postseason	Final ranking
Season	Year	Head coach	Association	Division	Conference	Win	Loss	Tie	Finish	Win	Loss	Tie	Postseason	Final ranking
Oklahoma Baptist Bison
1910	1910	Robert E. Kennedy	NCAA	—	Independent								—	—
1911	1911	Clyde Becker	NCAA	—	Independent	1	4	1					—	—
No team from 1912 to 1914
1915	1915	William L. Clark	NCAA	—	Independent	0	3	0					—	—
1916	1916	Bill Smith	NCAA	—	Independent	1	3	1					—	—
No team in 1917
1918	1918	Unknown	NCAA	—	Independent	0	1	0						
1919	1919	Oliver Talmage Martson	NCAA	—	Independent	1	7	1					—	—
1920	1920	Ivan Grove	NCAA	—	Independent	5	5	0					—	—
1921	1921	Ivan Grove	NCAA	—	Independent	3	5	1					—	—
1922	1922	Roland E. Lee	NCAA	—	OIC	2	7	1	9th	1	6	1	—	—
1923	1923	Vic Hurt	NCAA	—	OIC	4	4	1					—	—
1924	1924	Vic Hurt	NCAA	—	OIC	8	3	0	2nd	6	1	0	—	—
1925	1925	Vic Hurt	NCAA	—	OIC	8	1	0	2nd	6	1	0	—	—
1926	1926	Vic Hurt	NCAA	—	OIC	6	1	1	3rd	4	1	1	—	—
1927	1927	Vic Hurt	NCAA	—	OIC	6	1	2	T–1st	5	1	1	Conference co-champions	—
1928	1928	Vic Hurt	NCAA	—	OIC	5	2	2	2nd	4	1	2	—	—
1929	1929	Vic Hurt	NCAA	—	BFC	5	3	0	T–2nd	2	3	0	—	—
1930	1930	Archie W. Butcher	NCAA	—	BFC	4	5	0	4th	0	3	0	—	—
1931	1931	Vic Hurt	NCAA	—	BFC	3	6	0	3rd	1	2	0	—	—
1932	1932	Vic Hurt	NCAA	—	BFC	5	4	0	2nd	2	1	0	—	—
1933	1933	Vic Hurt	NCAA	—	Independent	6	2	1					—	—
1934	1934	Vic Hurt	NCAA	—	Independent	7	2	0					—	—
1935	1935	Eddie Hurt Jr. & Sam W. Wilcoxson	NCAA	—	Independent	2	6	1					—	—
1936	1936	Eddie Hurt Jr.	NCAA	—	OCC	4	4	2	5th	1	2	1	—	—
1937	1937	Eddie Hurt Jr.	NCAA	—	OCC	6	4	1	2nd	4	1	1	—	—
1938	1938	Eddie Hurt Jr.	NCAA	—	OCC	7	3	0	2nd	5	1	0	—	—
1939	1939	Windy Nicklaus	NCAA	—	OCC	8	2	0	T–2nd	4	2	0	—	—
1940	1940	Windy Nicklaus	NCAA	—	OCC	8	2	1	1st	5	0	1	Conference champions	—
No team from 1941 to 2012
2013	2013	Chris Jensen	NAIA	—	CSFL	4	7	0	4th	2	3	0	—	—
2014	2014	Chris Jensen	NAIA	—	CSFL	8	3	0	3rd	3	2	0	—	—
2015	2015	Chris Jensen	NCAA	Division II	GAC	2	9	0	10th	2	9	0	—	—
2016	2016	Chris Jensen	NCAA	Division II	GAC	2	9	0	T–10th	2	9	0	—	—
2017	2017	Chris Jensen	NCAA	Division II	GAC	2	9	0	T–11th	2	9	0	—	—
2018	2018	Chris Jensen	NCAA	Division II	GAC	5	6	0	T–6th	5	6	0	—	—
2019	2019	Chris Jensen	NCAA	Division II	GAC	7	4	0	5th	7	4	0	—	—
No team in 2020 due to COVID-19
2021	2021	Chris Jensen	NCAA	Division II	GAC	8	4	0	T–5th	7	4	0	W Heritage	—
2022	2022	Chris Jensen	NCAA	Division II	GAC	1	10	0	T–11th	1	10	0	—	—
2023	2023	Chris Jensen	NCAA	Division II	GAC	6	5	0	T–5th	6	5	0	—	—
2024	2024	Chris Jensen	NCAA	Division II	GAC	2	9	0	T–11th	2	9	0	—	—
