= Oklahoma Intercollegiate Conference (1914–1928) =

The Oklahoma Intercollegiate Conference was an intercollegiate athletic conference that existed from 1914 to 1928 and the first of two conferences to share this name. The conference's members were located in the state of Oklahoma. Some of its teams subsequently joined the Oklahoma Collegiate Conference, which eventually evolved into the second iteration of the Oklahoma Intercollegiate Conference in 1974.

== Football champions ==
- 1914 – Central State
- 1915 – Central State
- 1916 – Kendall
- 1917 – No champion
- 1918 – No champion
- 1919 – Kendall
- 1920 – Tulsa
- 1921 – Central State
- 1922 – Tulsa
- 1923 – Central State
- 1924 – Central State
- 1925 – Tulsa
- 1926 – Southwestern State
- 1927 – Oklahoma Baptist and Oklahoma City
- 1928 – Phillips

== Yearly football standings ==
1922 Oklahoma Intercollegiate Conference football standings
	Conf.					Overall
Team	W		L		T	W		L		T
Phillips +	5	–	0	–	0	7	–	1	–	0
Tulsa +	4	–	0	–	0	8	–	0	–	0
Southeastern Oklahoma State +	3	–	1	–	0	7	–	1	–	1
Oklahoma A&M	2	–	0	–	0	4	–	4	–	1
Central State Teachers	5	–	3	–	0	7	–	4	–	0
Southwestern State	4	–	3	–	0	5	–	4	–	0
East Central	2	–	3	–	0	5	–	3	–	1
Northwestern Oklahoma State	1	–	4	–	1	3	–	4	–	1
Oklahoma Baptist	1	–	6	–	1	2	–	7	–	1
Oklahoma City	0	–	7	–	0	0	–	9	–	0
$ – Conference champion

1926 Oklahoma Intercollegiate Conference football standings
	Conf.					Overall
Team	W		L		T	W		L		T
Southwestern State $	5	–	0	–	0	7	–	2	–	0
Tulsa	5	–	1	–	0	7	–	2	–	0
Oklahoma Baptist	4	–	1	–	1	6	–	1	–	1
Northeastern State	3	–	3	–	0	4	–	5	–	0
Southeastern Oklahoma State	3	–	3	–	0	4	–	5	–	0
Central State Teachers	2	–	2	–	2	3	–	3	–	3
Oklahoma City	3	–	4	–	1	5	–	4	–	1
Phillips	2	–	3	–	1	2	–	5	–	1
Northwestern Oklahoma State	0	–	5	–	1	2	–	5	–	2
East Central	0	–	5	–	0	2	–	7	–	0
$ – Conference champion

1924 Oklahoma Intercollegiate Conference football standings
	Conf.					Overall
Team	W		L		T	W		L		T
Central State Teachers $	7	–	0	–	0	9	–	2	–	0
Oklahoma Baptist	6	–	1	–	0	8	–	3	–	0
Southeastern Oklahoma State	4	–	2	–	0	4	–	4	–	0
Southwestern State	3	–	2	–	0	5	–	3	–	0
Northwestern Oklahoma State	2	–	2	–	1	4	–	4	–	1
Phillips	2	–	3	–	0	2	–	7	–	0
East Central	3	–	5	–	0	3	–	6	–	0
Tulsa	0	–	1	–	1	1	–	6	–	1
Northeastern State	0	–	4	–	0	3	–	6	–	0
Oklahoma City	0	–	7	–	0	1	–	8	–	0
$ – Conference champion

1927 Oklahoma Intercollegiate Conference football standings
	Conf.					Overall
Team	W		L		T	W		L		T
Oklahoma City +	5	–	1	–	2	8	–	1	–	2
Oklahoma Baptist +	5	–	1	–	1	6	–	1	–	2
Tulsa	3	–	1	–	0	8	–	1	–	0
Central State Teachers	3	–	1	–	3	3	–	1	–	4
Phillips	5	–	2	–	1	5	–	2	–	1
Northeastern State	2	–	3	–	1	3	–	4	–	1
Northwestern Oklahoma State	1	–	3	–	1	4	–	3	–	1
Southeastern Oklahoma State	1	–	4	–	1	2	–	5	–	3
Southwestern State	1	–	5	–	1	1	–	6	–	2
East Central	0	–	6	–	1	1	–	6	–	1
+ – Conference co-champions

1925 Oklahoma Intercollegiate Conference football standings
	Conf.					Overall
Team	W		L		T	W		L		T
Tulsa $	4	–	0	–	0	6	–	2	–	0
Oklahoma Baptist	6	–	1	–	0	8	–	1	–	0
Central State Teachers	4	–	1	–	1	4	–	3	–	2
Southwestern State	3	–	1	–	1	5	–	4	–	1
Northwestern Oklahoma State	2	–	2	–	0	5	–	4	–	0
Northeastern State	2	–	3	–	2	2	–	6	–	2
Oklahoma City	3	–	5	–	0	4	–	6	–	0
East Central	2	–	4	–	1	3	–	5	–	1
Phillips	1	–	6	–	0	1	–	8	–	0
Southeastern Oklahoma State	0	–	4	–	1	2	–	4	–	2
$ – Conference champion

1928 Oklahoma Intercollegiate Conference football standings
	Conf.					Overall
Team	W		L		T	W		L		T
Phillips $	5	–	1	–	1	7	–	1	–	1
Oklahoma Baptist	4	–	1	–	2	5	–	2	–	2
Tulsa	3	–	1	–	1	7	–	2	–	1
Northeastern State	2	–	1	–	2	4	–	1	–	2
Central State Teachers	3	–	2	–	1	5	–	3	–	1
East Central	3	–	2	–	2	4	–	3	–	2
Oklahoma City	2	–	2	–	1	6	–	2	–	1
Southwestern State	2	–	2	–	2	5	–	2	–	2
Northwestern Oklahoma State	1	–	6	–	0	2	–	6	–	0
Southeastern Oklahoma State	0	–	7	–	0	2	–	8	–	0
$ – Conference champion

== See also ==
- List of defunct college football conferences
