= Phillips Haymakers football =

Phillips Haymakers
- First season: 1908
- Last season: 1933
- Location: Enid, Oklahoma
- Conference: Southwest Conference
- Colors: Maroon and Black

The Phillips Haymakers football team represented the now-defunct Phillips University in college football. Between 1917 and 1920, John Maulbetsch was the head football coach at Phillips University. Maulbetsch was an All-American running back at the University of Michigan in 1914, where he earned the nickname the "Human Bullet". With his name recognition, he was able to recruit big-name talent to Phillips, including future Pro Football Hall of Famer Steve Owen, and future United States Olympic Committee President Doug Roby. Maulbetsch quickly turned Phillips into a major contender in the southwest, as his teams beat Oklahoma and Texas and lost only one game in the 1918 and 1919 seasons. The 1919 team, known as "Mauley's Iron Men", was considered by many experts to be the finest football squad in the southwest that season.

After defeating the Oklahoma and Texas football teams, the "Haymakers" gained a reputation as “one of the strongest teams in the southwest.” When Phillips defeated Texas, 10–0, in Austin, Texas in October 1919, the Longhorns had not lost a game since 1917. One Texas newspaper reported that Phillips had "whitewashed the Longhorns in their own corral."

As a result of Phillips' success, it was admitted to the Southwest Conference for the 1920 season. However, with the loss of several key players from the previous squads, Phillips fell to 4–5–1 record, failed to score a single point in conference play and immediately dropped out of the conference. Maulbetsch was hired to coach at Oklahoma A&M in 1921. Unable to sustain its previous success, the program's reputation faded; the school finally closed the program in 1933.
