= List of Texas Longhorns football seasons =

The following is a list of Texas Longhorns football seasons.

== Seasons ==
Year	Coach	Overall	Conference	Standing	Bowl/playoffs	Coaches^{#}	AP^{°}
Independent (1893)
1893	No coach	4–0					
R.D. Wentworth (Independent) (1894)
1894	R.D. Wentworth	6–1					
Frank Crawford (Independent) (1895)
1895	Frank Crawford	5–0					
Harry Robinson (SIAA) (1896)
1896	Harry Robinson	4–2–1	1–1	T–5th			
W.F. Kelly (SIAA) (1897)
1897	W.F. Kelly	6–2	0–0	T–5th			
D.F. Edwards (SIAA) (1898)
1898	D.F. Edwards	5–1	0–1	T–9th			
M.G. Clarke (SIAA) (1899)
1899	M.G. Clarke	6–2	3–2	7th			
S.H. Thompson (SIAA) (1900–1901)
1900	S.H. Thompson	6–0	1–0	4th			
1901	S.H. Thompson	8–2–1	0–0	7th			
J. B. Hart (SIAA) (1902)
1902	J. B. Hart	6–3–1	4–1	4th			
Ralph Hutchinson (SIAA) (1903–1905)
1903	Ralph Hutchinson	5–1–2	0–0–1	8th			
1904	Ralph Hutchinson	6–2	1–0	3rd			
1905	Ralph Hutchinson	5–4	2–1	4th			
H. R. Schenker (SIAA) (1906)
1906	H. R. Schenker	9–1	1–1	7th			
W. E. Metzenthin (Independent) (1907–1908)
1907	W. E. Metzenthin	6–1–1					
1908	W. E. Metzenthin	5–4					
Dexter W. Draper (Independent) (1909)
1909	Dexter W. Draper	4–3–1					
Billy Wasmund (TIAA) (1910)
1910	Billy Wasmund	6–2					
Dave Allerdice (TIAA) (1911–1914)
1911	Dave Allerdice	5–2					
1912	Dave Allerdice	7–1					
1913	Dave Allerdice	7–1	?–?	1st			
1914	Dave Allerdice	8–0	?–0	1st			
Dave Allerdice (Southwest Conference) (1915)
1915	Dave Allerdice	6–3	2–2	T–3rd			
Eugene Van Gent (Southwest Conference) (1916)
1916	Eugene Van Gent	7–2	5–1	1st			
William Juneau (Southwest Conference) (1917–1919)
1917	William Juneau	4–4	2–3	4th			
1918	William Juneau	9–0	4–0	1st			
1919	William Juneau	6–3	3–2	4th			
Berry Whitaker (Southwest Conference) (1920–1922)
1920	Berry Whitaker	9–0	5–0	1st			
1921	Berry Whitaker	6–1–1	1–0–1	2nd			
1922	Berry Whitaker	7–2	2–1	2nd			
E. J. Stewart (Southwest Conference) (1923–1926)
1923	E. J. Stewart	8–0–1	2–0–1	2nd			
1924	E. J. Stewart	5–3–1	2–3	6th			
1925	E. J. Stewart	6–2–1	2–1–1	2nd			
1926	E. J. Stewart	5–4	2–2	T–3rd			
Clyde Littlefield (Southwest Conference) (1927–1933)
1927	Clyde Littlefield	6–2–1	2–2–1	4th			
1928	Clyde Littlefield	7–2	5–1	1st			
1929	Clyde Littlefield	5–2–2	2–2–2	T–4th			
1930	Clyde Littlefield	8–1–1	4–1	1st			
1931	Clyde Littlefield	6–4	2–3	5th			
1932	Clyde Littlefield	8–2	5–1	2nd			
1933	Clyde Littlefield	4–5–2	2–3–1	5th			
Jack Chevigny (Southwest Conference) (1934–1936)
1934	Jack Chevigny	7–2–1	4–1–1	2nd			
1935	Jack Chevigny	4–6	1–5	T–6th			
1936	Jack Chevigny	2–6–1	1–5	T–6th			
Dana X. Bible (Southwest Conference) (1937–1946)
1937	Dana X. Bible	2–6–1	1–5	7th			
1938	Dana X. Bible	1–8	1–5	T–6th			
1939	Dana X. Bible	5–4	3–3	4th			
1940	Dana X. Bible	8–2	4–2	T–3rd			
1941	Dana X. Bible	8–1–1	4–1–1	T–2nd			4
1942	Dana X. Bible	9–2	5–1	1st	W Cotton		11
1943	Dana X. Bible	7–1–1	5–0	1st	T Cotton		14
1944	Dana X. Bible	5–4	3–2	2nd			
1945	Dana X. Bible	10–1	5–1	1st	W Cotton		10
1946	Dana X. Bible	8–2	4–2	3rd			15
Blair Cherry (Southwest Conference) (1947–1950)
1947	Blair Cherry	10–1	5–1	2nd	W Sugar		5
1948	Blair Cherry	7–3–1	2–1–1	2nd	W Orange		
1949	Blair Cherry	6–4	3–3	T–3rd			
1950	Blair Cherry	9–2	6–0	1st	L Cotton	4	3
Ed Price (Southwest Conference) (1951–1956)
1951	Ed Price	7–3	3–3	T–3rd			
1952	Ed Price	9–2	6–0	1st	W Cotton	11	10
1953	Ed Price	7–3	5–1	T–1st			
1954	Ed Price	4–5–1	2–3–1	5th			
1955	Ed Price	5–5	4–2	3rd			
1956	Ed Price	1–9	0–6	7th			
Darrell Royal (Southwest Conference) (1957–1976)
1957	Darrell Royal	6–4–1	4–1–1	2nd	L Sugar	11	11
1958	Darrell Royal	7–3	3–3	4th			
1959	Darrell Royal	9–2	5–1	T–1st	L Cotton	4	4
1960	Darrell Royal	7–3–1	5–2	T–2nd	T Bluebonnet	17	
1961	Darrell Royal	10–1	6–1	T–1st	W Cotton	4	3
1962	Darrell Royal	9–1–1	6–0–1	1st	L Cotton	4	4
1963	Darrell Royal	11–0	7–0	1st	W Cotton	1	1
1964	Darrell Royal	10–1	6–1	2nd	W Orange	5	5
1965	Darrell Royal	6–4	3–4	T–4th			
1966	Darrell Royal	7–4	5–2	2nd	W Bluebonnet		
1967	Darrell Royal	6–4	4–3	T–3rd			
1968	Darrell Royal	9–1–1	6–1	T–1st	W Cotton	5	3
1969	Darrell Royal	11–0	7–0	1st	W Cotton	1	1
1970	Darrell Royal	10–1	7–0	1st	L Cotton	1	3
1971	Darrell Royal	8–3	6–1	1st	L Cotton	12	18
1972	Darrell Royal	10–1	7–1	1st	W Cotton	5	3
1973	Darrell Royal	8–3	7–0	1st	L Cotton	8	14
1974	Darrell Royal	8–4	5–2	T–2nd	L Gator		T–17
1975	Darrell Royal	10–2	6–1	T–1st	W Bluebonnet	7	6
1976	Darrell Royal	5–5–1	4–4	5th			
Fred Akers (Southwest Conference) (1977–1986)
1977	Fred Akers	11–1	8–0	1st	L Cotton	5	4
1978	Fred Akers	9–3	6–2	T–2nd	W Sun	9	9
1979	Fred Akers	9–3	6–2	3rd	L Sun	13	12
1980	Fred Akers	7–5	4–4	T–4th	L Bluebonnet		
1981	Fred Akers	10–1–1	6–1–1	2nd	W Cotton	4	2
1982	Fred Akers	9–3	7–1	2nd	L Sun	18	17
1983	Fred Akers	11–1	8–0	1st	L Cotton	5	5
1984	Fred Akers	7–4–1	5–3	T–3rd	L Freedom		
1985	Fred Akers	8–4	6–2	T–2nd	L Bluebonnet		
1986	Fred Akers	5–6	4–4	5th			
David McWilliams (Southwest Conference) (1987–1991)
1987	David McWilliams	7–5	5–2	T–2nd	W Bluebonnet	19	
1988	David McWilliams	4–7	2–5	T–4th			
1989	David McWilliams	5–6	4–4	T–4th			
1990	David McWilliams	10–2	8–0	1st	L Cotton	11	12
1991	David McWilliams	5–6	4–4	T–5th			
John Mackovic (Southwest Conference) (1992–1995)
1992	John Mackovic	6–5	4–3	T–2nd			
1993	John Mackovic	5–5–1	5–2	T–2nd			
1994	John Mackovic	8–4	4–3	T–1st	W Sun^{†}	23	25
1995	John Mackovic	10–2–1	7–0	1st	L Sugar^{†}	14	14
John Mackovic (Big 12 Conference) (1996–1997)
1996	John Mackovic	8–5	6–2	1st (South)	L Fiesta^{†}	23	23
1997	John Mackovic	4–7	2–6	T–4th (South)			
Mack Brown (Big 12 Conference) (1998–2013)
1998	Mack Brown	9–3	6–2	2nd (South)	W Cotton	16	15
1999	Mack Brown	9–5	6–2	1st (South)	L Cotton	23	21
2000	Mack Brown	9–3	7–1	2nd (South)	L Holiday	12	12
2001	Mack Brown	11–2	7–1	T–1st (South)	W Holiday	5	5
2002	Mack Brown	11–2	6–2	T–1st (South)	W Cotton	7	6
2003	Mack Brown	10–3	7–1	2nd (South)	L Holiday	11	12
2004	Mack Brown	11–1	7–1	2nd (South)	W Rose^{†}	4	5
2005	Mack Brown	13–0	8–0	1st (South)	W Rose^{†}	1	1
2006	Mack Brown	10–3	6–2	2nd (South)	W Alamo	13	13
2007	Mack Brown	10–3	5–3	2nd (South)	W Holiday	10	10
2008	Mack Brown	12–1	7–1	T–1st (South)	W Fiesta^{†}	3	4
2009	Mack Brown	13–1	8–0	1st (South)	L BCS NCG^{†}	2	2
2010	Mack Brown	5–7	2–6	6th (South)			
2011	Mack Brown	8–5	4–5	T–6th	W Holiday		
2012	Mack Brown	9–4	5–4	T–3rd	W Alamo	18	19
2013	Mack Brown	8–5	7–2	T–2nd	L Alamo		
Charlie Strong (Big 12 Conference) (2014–2016)
2014	Charlie Strong	6–7	5–4	T–6th	L Texas		
2015	Charlie Strong	5–7	4–5	T–5th			
2016	Charlie Strong	5–7	3–6	T–6th			
Tom Herman (Big 12 Conference) (2017–2020)
2017	Tom Herman	7–6	5–4	T–4th	W Texas		
2018	Tom Herman	10–4	7–2	2nd	W Sugar^{†}	9	9
2019	Tom Herman	8–5	5–4	T–3rd	W Alamo		25
2020	Tom Herman	7–3	5–3	3rd	W Alamo	20	19
Steve Sarkisian (Big 12 Conference) (2021–2023)
2021	Steve Sarkisian	5–7	3–6	7th			
2022	Steve Sarkisian	8–5	6–3	3rd	L Alamo	25	25
2023	Steve Sarkisian	12–2	8–1	1st	L Sugar^{†} (CFP Semifinal)	4	3
Steve Sarkisian (Southeastern Conference) (2024–present)
2024	Steve Sarkisian	13–3	7–1	2nd	W CFP First Round^{†} W Peach^{†} (CFP Quarterfinal); L Cotton^{†} (CFP Semifinal)	3	4
2025	Steve Sarkisian	10–3	6–2	T–5th	W Citrus	13	12
Total:		968–396–33					
National championship Conference title Conference division title or championship game berth
^{†}Indicates Bowl Coalition, Bowl Alliance, BCS, or CFP / New Years' Six bowl.; ^{#}Rankings from final Coaches Poll.
