= Ben Tompkins =

American football player and official (1929–2023)

Personal information
- Born: October 4, 1929 Fort Worth, Texas, U.S.
- Died: April 28, 2023 (aged 93)
- Years active: 1949-1951
- Height: 5 ft 11 in (180 cm)
- Weight: 175 lb (79 kg; 12 st 7 lb)

Sport
- Sport: Baseball, Football
- Position: IF, QB, K
- College team: Texas Longhorns

Ben Hiner Tompkins (October 4, 1929 – April 28, 2023) was an American college and professional athlete and National Football League (NFL) referee. At the University of Texas, he played baseball on the first back-to-back college World Series champions in 1949–50 as an All-Conference third baseman and was the starting quarterback for the Longhorns conference championship football team in 1950. He later played six seasons of minor league baseball in the Philadelphia Phillies organization, and then spent 20 years as an NFL referee who officiated two Super Bowls.

== Early life ==
Ben Tompkins was born in Fort Worth, Texas, on October 4, 1929. He grew up there and became a starter on both the football team and the baseball team at Fort Worth Polytechnic High School.

== Football ==
=== Player ===
In 1949, at the University of Texas, Tompkins was the back-up quarterback to Paul Campbell and averaged only four minutes of play per game. But the next year, Tompkins beat out T Jones and Dan Page to become the team's starting quarterback. The season was the last for coach Blair Cherry and Texas came one point away from making it a National Championship one. An undefeated regular season was prevented only by a 14-13 loss to eventual National Champion, and then #3 Oklahoma; a game that turned on a controversial goal line stand, missed extra point and a dropped snap on a punt late in the game. When the Longhorns kicker, Billy Porter, missed two more extra points the next week against Arkansas, Tompkins took over as kicker as well. Later in the season, Texas upset #1 SMU, the first defeat of a #1 ranked team in school history (and a feat only repeated four times since). They won the conference title, a trip to the Cotton Bowl and a #3 ranking in the AP Poll (#2 in the coaches). They were ranked behind #2 Army who would lose their final game to Navy after the last ranking was issued and #1 Oklahoma who would lose to Kentucky in the Sugar Bowl. But Texas also lost their bowl game, 14-20, to #4 Tennessee. For his play, he led he Longhorns in passing yards and total offense, Tompkins was selected as an Honorable Mention to the 1950 All-Southwest Conference team.

In 1951, the first season with coach Ed Price, it appeared that Tompkins would again compete with T Jones and Dan Page for the starting role, but in February, with one year of eligibility left, he signed a $50,000 contract to play infielder for the Philadelphia Phillies. He was drafted into the military two days later and instead spent the next two years playing football for the Army.

==== Records ====
- UT – Highest Completion Percentage (min 100 attempts) (55.1%), season, surpassed by Bret Stafford in 1985
- UT – Highest Completion Percentage (min 100 attempts) (55.0%), career, surpassed by Shannon Kelley in 1988
- UT – Highest Average Gain per pass attempt (min 100 attempts) (8.4), career; surpassed by Randy McEachern in 1978

=== High School Coach ===
He returned to football as a coach from 1960 to 1962, during which time he was head football coach at Fort Worth Technical High School, where he had a record of 3-23-1.

=== Officiating ===
In 1953, while waiting for spring training to start, he got a job officiating junior high football games. It was a job he continued even after his baseball career was over, moving up to college games in the 1960s. By 1969, he was officiating games in the Missouri Valley Conference, where the pass-oriented offense was closer to the pro game. In 1971, he was called up to the NFL where he was a back judge (now field judge) for 20 years, officiating two Super Bowls, XIV and XVIII, the game in which O. J. Simpson set the single season rushing record, the Miami-Oakland 1974 AFC divisional playoff game ("Sea of Hands") and the 1986 AFC Championship game, famous for "The Drive". He retired from officiating in 1991. For most of his officiating career, he wore uniform number 52 (currently worn by Super Bowl XLIX and Super Bowl LIV referee Bill Vinovich) and was easily distinguishable by the wire-rimmed eyeglasses he wore. Coincidentally, another top back judge of the 1970s, Stan Javie, also wore eyeglasses, albeit with tinted lenses.

== Baseball ==
=== College player ===
Tompkins played on the first back-to-back College World Series championship teams in history, winning two conference and national championships in two years. Though he didn't play enough in 1949 to letter, in 1950 he was a starter who was selected to the All-Southwest conference team at third base. He also played shortstop and second base during his time at Texas.

=== Professional player ===
In 1951, he was signed by the Philadelphia Phillies with the intention of playing for their Wilmington, DE club in the Class B interstate league, but two days later, he got a draft notice and spent the next two years in the service, mostly playing football. When his military obligation was completed, he returned to the Phillies organization and played second base for six years in their farm system, landing on 5 different teams. In 1953, he was an all-star, Rookie of the year and MVP for the Class B III-League Terre Haute Phillies. The next year, he moved up to the Class-A Schenectady Blue Jays and then later in the year to the AAA Syracuse Chiefs, with which he played in the 1954 Little World Series. He stayed with Syracuse for four more years, even after they moved to Miami in 1956 where one of his teammates was a 50-year-old Satchel Paige. Tompkins spent his last season as a player at the Class A Asheville Tourists and then the AA Memphis Chickasaws.

In 1956, with the Marlins, Tompkins played in the first, and one of the only, baseball games at Miami's Orange Bowl stadium. He hit the first and only home run ever hit at the Orange Bowl.

=== Manager ===
In 1960, his last in baseball, he managed the Class D Johnson City Phillies to a 29–40 record. The next season they became a part of the Cardinals organization.

== Later life and death ==
Tompkins left Texas before graduating, but finished his undergraduate work at Texas Wesleyan by taking classes in the summer. In 1962, following the end of his football coaching career, he started law school at SMU, from which he graduated in 1966. After getting his law degree and passing the bar that same year, he went to work as a prosecutor in the district attorney's office in Fort Worth until 1969, and then did criminal defense work with a partner and as a solo practitioner until 1983. At that point he started the firm Reynolds and Tompkins, and did insurance defense work with them and others for the next nine years before moving over to the plaintiff's side with Bailey, Galyen and Gold.

Tompkins died on April 28, 2023, at the age of 93.
