= 1998 United States House of Representatives elections in North Carolina =

- November 3, 1998

All 12 North Carolina seats in the United States House of Representatives
	Majority party	Minority party
Party	Republican	Democratic
Last election	6	6
Seats won	7	5
Seat change	▲1	▼1
Popular vote	1,014,010	827,078
Percentage	53.26%	43.44%
Swing	▼0.03%	▼1.74%
Republican
40–50%
50–60%
60–70%
70–80%
80–90%
90–100%
Democratic
40–50%
50–60%
60–70%
70–80%
80–90%
90–100%

The United States House of Representative elections of 1998 in North Carolina were held on 3 November 1998 as part of the biennial election to the United States House of Representatives. All twelve seats in North Carolina, and 435 nationwide, were elected.

The Republicans won seven seats to the Democrats' five. Eleven incumbents won re-election, while Democrat Bill Hefner's retirement in the 8th district allowed Republican Robin Hayes to enter the House for the first time. The Libertarian Party ran in every district, almost quadrupling their total vote share, but their vote was smaller than the margin of victory in all races.

== Redistricting ==
After the 1990 census, the US Department of Justice directed North Carolina under VRA preclearance to submit a map with two majority-minority districts. The resultant map with two such congressional districts, the 1st and 12th, was the subject of lawsuits by voters who claimed that it was an illegal racial gerrymander. A three-judge panel of the U.S. District Court for the Eastern District of North Carolina dismissed the suit, which was appealed to the U.S. Supreme Court. On June 28, 1993, the U.S. Supreme Court, in Shaw v. Reno, found that the 12th congressional district was an unlawful racial gerrymander. Justice Sandra Day O'Connor's opinion found that if a district's shape, like the 12th's, was "so bizarre on its face that it is 'unexplainable on grounds other than race'", that it would be subject to strict scrutiny as a racial gerrymander, and remanded the case to the Eastern District of North Carolina.

On August 22, 1994, the Eastern District of North Carolina on remand in Shaw v. Hunt found that the 12th congressional district was a racial gerrymander (as the U.S. Supreme Court had directed), but ruled that the map satisfied strict scrutiny due to the compelling interest of compliance with the Voting Rights Act and increasing black political power. This was again appealed to the U.S. Supreme Court, which reversed the Eastern District of North Carolina on June 13, 1996, and found that the North Carolina plan violated the Equal Protection Clause and that the 12th congressional district did not satisfy a compelling interest.

== Summary ==
1998 United States House of Representative elections in North Carolina – Summary
Party	Seats	Gains	Losses	Net gain/loss	Seats %	Votes %	Votes	+/−
Republican	7	1	0	+1	58.33	53.26	1,014,010	–0.03
Democratic	5	0	1	–1	41.67	43.44	827,078	–1.74
Libertarian	0	0	0	±0	0	3.29	62,678	+2.38

== District 1 ==
1998 United States House of Representatives North Carolina 1st District election
Party	Candidate	Votes	%	±%
Democratic	Eva M. Clayton (incumbent)	85,125	62.25	–3.65
Republican	Ted Tyler	50,578	36.99	+3.86
Libertarian	Jack Schwartz	1,044	0.76	+0.11
Turnout		136,747		

== District 2 ==
=== General election ===
==== Polling ====
Poll source	Date(s)	Sample size	Margin of error	Bob Etheridge (D)	Dan Page (R)	Other / undecided (Note: Calculated by taking the difference of 100% and all other candidates combined.)
SurveyUSA	October 26, 1998	500	—	52%	39%	9%

==== Results ====
1998 United States House of Representatives North Carolina 2nd District election
Party	Candidate	Votes	%	±%
Democratic	Bob Etheridge (incumbent)	100,550	57.39	4.85
Republican	Dan Page	72,997	41.67	−4.01
Libertarian	Mark Jackson	1,647	0.94	−0.39
Turnout		175,194		

== District 3 ==
1998 United States House of Representatives North Carolina 3rd District election
Party	Candidate	Votes	%	±%
Republican	Walter B. Jones Jr. (incumbent)	83,529	61.91	+0.56
Democratic	Jon Williams	50,041	37.09	–0.74
Libertarian	Chris Nubel	1,342	0.99	N/A
Turnout				

== District 4 ==
=== General election ===
==== Polling ====
Poll source	Date(s)	Sample size	Margin of error	David Price (D)	Tom Roberg (R)	Other / undecided
SurveyUSA	October 25, 1998	500	—	54%	41%	5%

==== Results ====
1998 United States House of Representatives North Carolina 4th District election
Party	Candidate	Votes	%	±%
Democratic	David Price (incumbent)	129,157	57.43	+3.03
Republican	Tom Roberg	93,469	41.56	–2.20
Libertarian	Gary Goodson	2,284	1.02	–0.41
Turnout		224,910		

Results by county Burr: 60–70%; 70–80%; Robinson: 50–60%

== District 5 ==
1998 United States House of Representatives North Carolina 5th District election
Party	Candidate	Votes	%	±%
Republican	Richard Burr (incumbent)	119,103	67.56	+5.48
Democratic	Mike Robinson	55,806	31.66	–3.79
Libertarian	Gene Paczelt	1,382	0.78	–1.22
Turnout		176,291		

== District 6 ==
1998 United States House of Representatives North Carolina 6th District election
Party	Candidate	Votes	%	±%
Republican	Howard Coble (incumbent)	112,740	88.64	+15.20
Libertarian	Jeffrey D. Bentley	14,454	11.36	+10.19
Turnout		127,194		

== District 7 ==
1998 United States House of Representatives North Carolina 7th District election
Party	Candidate	Votes	%	±%
Democratic	Mike McIntyre (incumbent)	124,366	91.25	+38.37
Libertarian	Paul Meadows	11,924	8.75	+7.80
Turnout		136,290		

== District 8 ==
=== General election ===
==== Polling ====
Poll source	Date(s)	Sample size	Margin of error	Robin Hayes (R)	Mike Taylor (D)	Other / undecided
Wirthlin Worldwide (R) (Note: Poll conducted for an unspecified Republican sponsor.)	October 15, 1998	505	—	51%	39%	10%

==== Results ====
1998 United States House of Representatives North Carolina 8th District election
Party	Candidate	Votes	%	±%
Republican	Robin Hayes	67,505	50.71	+7.01
Democratic	Mike Taylor	64,127	48.17	–7.01
Libertarian	Bob Burns	1,492	1.12	N/A
Turnout		133,124		

== District 9 ==
1998 United States House of Representatives North Carolina 9th District election
Party	Candidate	Votes	%	±%
Republican	Sue Wilkins Myrick (incumbent)	120,570	69.26	+6.31
Democratic	Rory Blake	51,345	29.49	–5.90
Libertarian	Alvin Jeffrey Taylor	2,167	1.24	+0.27
Turnout				

== District 10 ==
1998 United States House of Representatives North Carolina 10th District election
Party	Candidate	Votes	%	±%
Republican	Cass Ballenger (incumbent)	118,541	85.58	+15.60
Libertarian	Deborah Garrett Eddins	19,970	14.42	N/A
Turnout		138,511		

== District 11 ==
1998 United States House of Representatives North Carolina 11th District election
Party	Candidate	Votes	%	±%
Republican	Charles H. Taylor (incumbent)	112,908	56.62	–1.65
Democratic	David Young	84,256	42.25	+2.23
Libertarian	Chris Heckert	2,259	1.13	+0.12
Turnout		199,423		

== District 12 ==
1998 United States House of Representatives North Carolina 12th District election
Party	Candidate	Votes	%	±%
Democratic	Mel Watt (incumbent)	82,305	55.96	–15.53
Republican	Scott Keadle	62,070	42.20	+15.49
Libertarian	Michael G. Smith	2,713	1.84	+0.77
Turnout		147,088		
