= James "T" Jones =

American football player (1931–2020)

No. 21 – Texas Longhorns football
- Positions: QB, DB, PR

Personal information
- Born: January 10, 1931; Childress, Texas, U.S.
- Died: September 15, 2020 (aged 89); Horseshoe Bay, Texas, U.S.
- Listed height: 6 ft 1 in (1.85 m)
- Listed weight: 185 lb (84 kg)

Career information
- High school: Childress High School

Awards and highlights
- Awards: Houston Post's 1952 Southwest Conference MVP; Honors: 1952 All-Southwest Conference Team; Longhorn Hall of Honor (1978); Texas Tech Hall of Honor (2004); Texas High School Football Hall of Fame inductee (2009); Championships: Southwest Conference (1950, 1952); Bowls: 1953 Cotton Bowl Classic

James Carroll "T" Jones (January 10, 1931 – September 15, 2020) was an American football player, coach and athletic director. He was the starting quarterback of the Texas Longhorns in 1951–52 and the athletic director at Texas Tech University from 1985 to 1993.

== Early life ==
James Carroll Jones, or "T" as he preferred to be called, was born in Childress, Texas, in 1931 and grew up on a farm there. He was one of six children, and had an older brother who died from blood poisoning that resulted from a football injury. Each of his two other brothers eventually went to college on football scholarships. His name on his birth certificate was "Baby Boy Jones" but he got the name "T" from his older brother, Charles, who used to proudly point to his young sibling and say "Tee the baby!"

As a senior in 1948, Jones was an All-State T formation quarterback who led Childress to a successful season as a dual-threat quarterback, passing for 1,370 yards and running for 500 more. He played in the 1949 all-state high school all-star game in Beaumont where he was forced to play tailback, and he was voted the best back in the game. He was also a top basketball player and pole vaulter.

Many people think the nickname "T" comes from his play in the T formation, but it actually comes from his brother Charles, who played football against T at Baylor. When T was born, his parents did not have a name for him and so his birth certificate reads "Baby Boy Jones". Charles would point to T and say "see the baby," but he couldn't pronounce "see" so it sounded like "Tee the baby." Jones was known as "Tee Tee" for a long time, but shortened that to just T when he got older.

== College football ==
Jones played both ways for the Texas Longhorns, as both a defensive back and a quarterback, while also returning punts.

He quarterbacked the freshman team and then started a few games at defensive back his sophomore year while also taking some snaps at quarterback.

In 1951, the first season with coach Ed Price, Jones was set to compete with Dan Page and Tompkins for the starting role. But when Tompkins left in the winter to play professional baseball, Jones got the start in the opener against Bear Bryant's #6-ranked Kentucky, and he threw the game winning pass to help Texas upset the Wildcats. Texas switched from the straight-T offense to the Split-T and Jones led the team to victories against Purdue, North Carolina and #11 Oklahoma. The last was their first victory over the Sooners in four years, and their first win in the Cotton Bowl in the last seven attempts. Texas climbed to #4 in the rankings before being upset by Arkansas, a team they had not lost to since 1938. In the game Jones and Page combined for 1-12 passing, with Page making the only completion, and lost by 2 on a Pat Summerall field goal. Jones started the following game against Rice, but Page led the Longhorns to the win and took over as starter for the rest of the season. Jones threw only four more passes in 1951. With Page under center, Texas lost to #16 Baylor for the first time since 1938 and upset #12 TCU. They needed to beat Texas A&M for a share of the conference title and a trip to the Orange Bowl, but in a game that Jones sat out, Texas was upset 22–21 and beaten by A&M for the first time since 1939.

In 1952, Jones, halfbacks Gib Dawson and Billy Quinn and fullback Dick Ochoa created Texas' all-time greatest backfield combination. All four made the All-Southwest Conference team, the only time one school's backfield ever did that in conference history. Against Texas A&M, Jones, Dawson and Quinn all rushed for more than 100 yards, the first time 3 players ever did that in a single game for a Longhorn team, and a feat that has only been repeated once since. The team set the school record for rushing, and the school and conference records for total offense. Jones won the Houston Post's Southwest Conference MVP Trophy. The Longhorns won the Southwest Conference and beat Tennessee in the 1953 Cotton Bowl.

He finished his career with a 14–3 record, the best winning percentage of any quarterback to start for more than one season in school history at the time and third best in the Southwest Conference history at the time.

Jones was elected to the Longhorn Hall of Honor in 1978.

=== Records ===
- UT - Best winning percentage (minimum 1 season), career - 82.4%, surpassed by James Street in 1969

== Coaching ==
After graduating in June 1953, Jones was hired by Dana X. Bible as a graduate assistant coach for the Texas Longhorn football team in 1953. He then served two and a half years in the Army Transportation Corps as part of his obligation as a Korean War era ROTC student. When that was completed in 1956, he considered trying out for the San Francisco 49ers but instead he was hired as an assistant coach for the Longhorns under Ed Price. When Darrell Royal replaced Price, Jones was retained and stayed on Royal's staff as a backfield coach for the freshman team, then a quarterback coach and later defensive backfield coach. During that time Texas won 3 Southwest Conference Championships and 1 Cotton Bowl. In the summer before the 1963 National Championship season, Jones decided he needed to spend more time with his family due to his wife's illness and he resigned from the team.

== Athletic director ==
Jones spent six years selling class rings and then another twelve at City National Bank in Austin, Texas, where he was eventually a senior vice-president. In 1980, he was hired as an assistant athletic director by then Texas athletic director Bill Ellington, who had been on Royal's coaching staff with Jones. When Ellington retired in 1981, many suspected that Jones was the heir-apparent, but instead the job went to then Kansas State AD Deloss Dodds. Jones was retained by Dodds and stayed at Texas, being promoted to associate athletic director in 1982.

On August 10, 1985, Jones was hired as athletic director at Texas Tech to replace John Conley. He immediately merged the men's and women's athletic departments and dealt with an investigation into football recruiting violations. He made several key hiring decisions including successful coaches Spike Dykes, James Dickey and Larry Hays; oversaw construction of new athletic offices and a baseball stadium and was AD of the program during the Lady Raiders run to the 1993 NCAA women's basketball championship—the school's first and only one in any NCAA sport. The Dickey hiring was the source of some tension with Dr. Robert Lawless, then the school president, who preferred a national search rather than promoting a current assistant. Shortly after the school's first national championship, Jones resigned abruptly on June 8, 1996, with 14 months remaining on his contract, because he felt like he had lost "the confidence of the President and the Board of Regents."

In recognition of his contributions, he was inducted into the Texas Tech Hall of Honor in 2004.

Jones was married twice, with two kids from the first marriage. After leaving Texas Tech, he retired to Horseshoe Bay, Texas, just west of Austin.
