= 1952 Tulsa Golden Hurricane football team =

American college football season

1952 Tulsa Golden Hurricane football

Gator Bowl, L 13–14 vs. Florida
- Conference: Missouri Valley Conference

Ranking
- AP: No. 12
- Record: 8–2–1 (3–1 MVC)
- Head coach: Buddy Brothers (5th season)
- Captains: Tommy Hudspeth; Marvin Matuszak; Howard Waugh
- Home stadium: Skelly Field

1952 Missouri Valley Conference football standings
	Conf.					Overall
Team	W		L		T	W		L		T
Houston $	3	–	0	–	0	8	–	2	–	0
No. 12 Tulsa	3	–	1	–	0	8	–	2	–	1
Oklahoma A&M	2	–	2	–	0	3	–	7	–	0
Detroit	1	–	3	–	0	2	–	7	–	0
Wichita	0	–	3	–	0	3	–	6	–	1
$ – Conference champion; Rankings from AP Poll

The 1952 Tulsa Golden Hurricane football team represented the University of Tulsa during the 1952 college football season. In their fifth year under head coach Buddy Brothers, the Golden Hurricane compiled an 8–2–1 record (3–1 against Missouri Valley Conference opponents) and lost to Florida, 14–13, in the 1953 Gator Bowl. The team defeated Kansas State (26–7), Oklahoma A&M (23–21), Arkansas (44–34) and Texas Tech (26–20), tied Cincinnati (14–14), and lost to #19 Houston (7–33).

== Schedule ==
Date	Time	Opponent	Rank	Site	Result	Attendance	Source
September 27	8:00 p.m.	Hardin–Simmons*		Skelly Field; Tulsa, OK	W 56–27	15,500	
October 4		Cincinnati*		Skelly Field; Tulsa, OK	T 14–14	17,500	
October 11		at Houston		Rice Stadium; Houston, TX	L 7–33	31,000	
October 18		Kansas State*		Skelly Field; Tulsa, OK	W 26–7	12,500	
October 25		Wichita		Skelly Field; Tulsa, OK	W 28–0	12,500	
November 1		Oklahoma A&M		Skelly Field; Tulsa, OK (rivalry)	W 23–21	20,000	
November 8		No. 11 Villanova*^{†}		Skelly Field; Tulsa, OK	W 42–6	18,000	
November 14		at Detroit		University of Detroit Stadium; Detroit, MI	W 62–21	13,120	
November 22		Arkansas*	No. 11	Skelly Field; Tulsa, OK	W 44–34	12,500	
November 29	2:00 p.m.	at Texas Tech*	No. 11	Jones Stadium; Lubbock, TX	W 26–20	10,100–15,500	
January 1, 1953		vs. No. 15 Florida*	No. 12	Gator Bowl Stadium; Jacksonville, FL (Gator Bowl)	L 13–14	30,015	
*Non-conference game; ^{†}Homecoming; Rankings from AP Poll released prior to the game; All times are in Central time

== After the season ==
=== 1953 NFL draft ===
The following Golden Hurricane players were selected in the 1953 NFL draft following the season.

Round	Pick	Player	Position	NFL club
3	29	Marv Matuszak	Linebacker	Pittsburgh Steelers
3	32	Bob St. Clair	Tackle	San Francisco 49ers
4	49	Willie Roberts	End	Los Angeles Rams
6	73	Howard Waugh	Back	Los Angeles Rams
8	87	Jim Prewett	Tackle	Baltimore Colts
9	104	Floyd Harrawood	Tackle	Green Bay Packers
12	135	Kaye Vaughan	Guard	Baltimore Colts
13	149	Ronnie Morris	Back	Chicago Cardinals
15	176	Gene Helwig	Back	Green Bay Packers
