= 1952 Houston Cougars football team =

American college football season

1952 Houston Cougars football
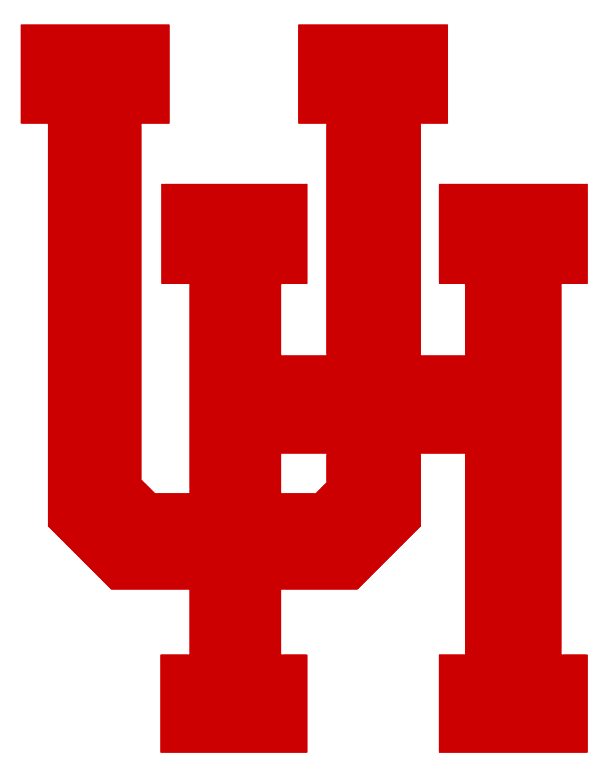

MVC champion
- Conference: Missouri Valley Conference

Ranking
- Coaches: No. 19
- Record: 8–2 (3–0 MVC)
- Head coach: Clyde Lee (5th season)
- Offensive scheme: Split-T
- Home stadium: Rice Stadium

1952 Missouri Valley Conference football standings
	Conf.					Overall
Team	W		L		T	W		L		T
Houston $	3	–	0	–	0	8	–	2	–	0
No. 12 Tulsa	3	–	1	–	0	8	–	2	–	1
Oklahoma A&M	2	–	2	–	0	3	–	7	–	0
Detroit	1	–	3	–	0	2	–	7	–	0
Wichita	0	–	3	–	0	3	–	6	–	1
$ – Conference champion; Rankings from AP Poll

The 1952 Houston Cougars football team, also known as the Houston Cougars, Houston, or UH, represented the University of Houston in the 1952 college football season as a member of the NCAA. It was the 7th year of season play for Houston. The team was coached by fifth-year head coach Clyde Lee. The team played its games off-campus at Rice Stadium, which had been built in 1950. The Cougars finished the season ranked as #19 by the Coaches Poll. It was the first time Houston finished a season as a nationally ranked team. Another first for the program was a conference championship, as the Cougars earned a perfect 3–0 record in Missouri Valley Conference play.

Following the season, Houston defensive tackle J. D. Kimmel was voted as the program's first All-American. Kimmel had been drafted by the San Francisco 49ers in the 1952 NFL draft prior to the season's beginning, and would later be drafted into the Houston Cougars Hall of Honor in 1973. Four other Houston players were also taken in the 1952 NFL draft.

== Schedule ==
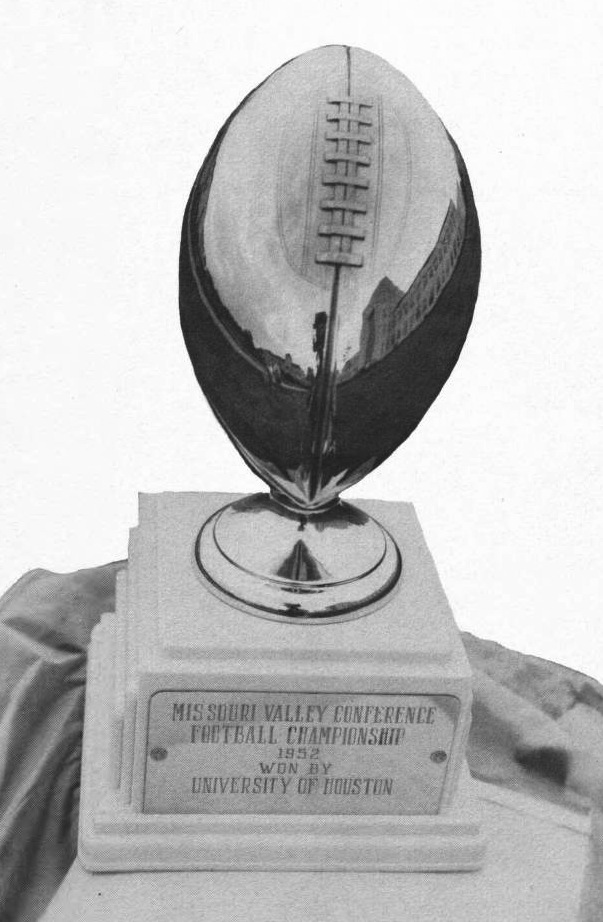
Houston's 1952 Missouri Valley Conference championship trophy

Date	Opponent	Rank	Site	Result	Attendance	Source
September 20	Texas A&M*		Rice Stadium; Houston, TX	L 13–21	50,000–54,000	
September 27	at Arkansas*		Razorback Stadium; Fayetteville, AR	W 17–7	12,000	
October 4	at Oklahoma A&M		Lewis Field; Stillwater, OK	W 10–7	15,000	
October 11	Tulsa^{†}		Rice Stadium; Houston, TX	W 33–7	31,000	
October 25	at Arizona State*		Goodwin Stadium; Tempe, AZ	W 6–0	15,000	
November 1	at Texas Tech*		Jones Stadium; Lubbock, TX (rivalry)	W 20–7	17,000–20,000	
November 8	No. 14 Ole Miss*		Rice Stadium; Houston, TX	L 0–6	34,000–34,500	
November 15	Baylor*		Rice Stadium; Houston, TX (rivalry)	W 28–6	30,000–33,000	
November 29	Detroit	No. 19	Rice Stadium; Houston, TX	W 33–19	7,200	
December 6	Wyoming*		Rice Stadium; Houston, TX	W 20–0	23,000	
*Non-conference game; ^{†}Homecoming; Rankings from AP Poll released prior to the game

== Game summaries ==
=== Texas A&M ===
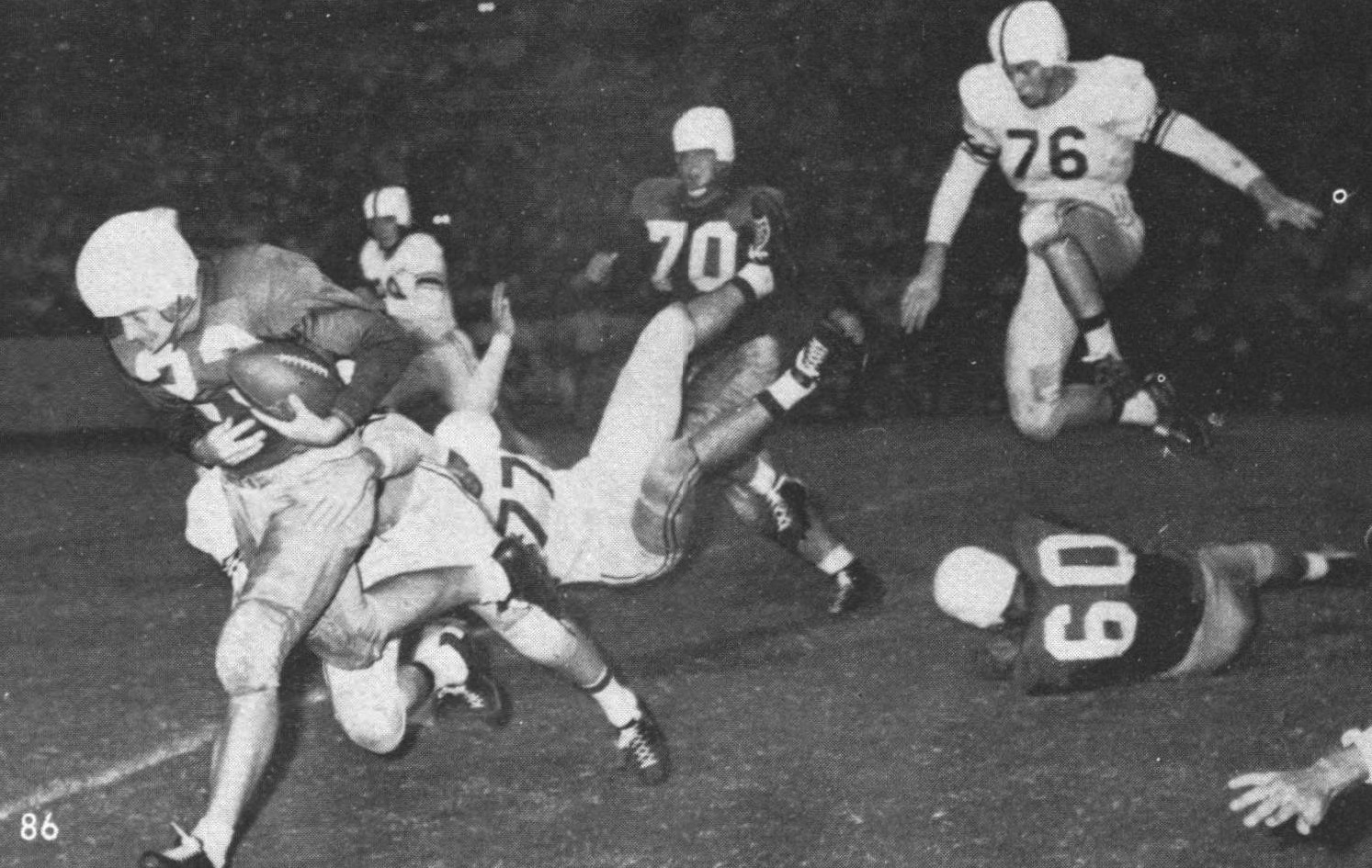
Texas A&M attempts to stop Houston's Harlan Baldridge during a rush

	1	2	3	4	Total
Texas A&M	14	0	7	0	21
Houston	0	0	6	7	13

The Houston Cougars met with in-state rival Texas A&M for the first time as they hosted the Aggies at off-campus Rice Stadium in Houston. Texas A&M was a member of the Southwest Conference, and was led by second-year head coach Raymond George. With an attendance of 54,000, it was the second-largest crowd that Houston had competed for at the time, only surpassed by the 55,000 from the previous season's opener against #13 Baylor. It was the third time that the Houston Cougars faced a Southwest Conference opponent in its history, and was a continuation of the losing streak against the conference. This followed the rejection of Houston along with Texas Tech by the conference in their bids to join just months earlier. While Texas A&M was slightly favored, Houston was considered to have one of the best teams in the history of its program. Army transfer and Texarkana native J.D. Kimmel was a draftee in the previous NFL draft, and eventually went on to have a career in the professional league.

The game's first half was dominated by the Aggies, as their second possession of the game yielded their first touchdown. Texas A&M executed another successful touchdown before the end of the first half, while Houston was still scoreless. The third quarter featured Houston's first score of the game, with an 80-yard drive leading to a touchdown. However, with a low PAT kick, the Cougars trailed the Aggies 14–6. The Aggies answered with another touchdown. Despite quarterback Bobby Clatterbuck completing a 27-yard end zone pass to S.M. Meeks for a touchdown and successfully achieving the extra point during the fourth quarter, Houston would not answer with any more points for the duration of the game, and lost.

Following the 1952 season, Texas A&M became a regular opponent of Houston, and the two continued to meet with each other every year through 1965.

=== Arkansas ===
	1	2	3	4	Total
Houston	3	0	7	7	17
Arkansas	0	7	0	0	7

Next, Houston met with another Southwest Conference opponent, the Arkansas Razorbacks at Razorback Stadium in Fayetteville, Arkansas. This was another first meeting between teams. Arkansas was coached by third-year head coach Otis Douglas, and was coming off of a 22–20 win over conference opponent Oklahoma State (then known as "Oklahoma A&M"). An established Arkansas team was favored to win, and the upset over the Razorbacks marked the first victory for a Houston team over a Southwest Conference opponent.

Houston won the coin toss, and elected to kickoff to the Razorbacks for the first play of the game. Arkansas returned the kick to the 24-yard line. During the first scrimmage of the game, Arkansas fumbled, and Houston's Jack Chambers recovered the ball for a turnover. Although unsuccessful for a touchdown drive, the Cougars moved the ball far enough for Houston's Verle Cray to kick a field goal for the first score of the game on fourth down. During the second quarter, Arkansas took the lead with a 62-yard reception by Razorback Lewis Carpenter for a touchdown. This was to be their sole score of the game. In the third quarter, Meeks rushed for the Cougars' first touchdown, and brought Houston back in the lead. Houston fullback Tommy Bailes scored the final touchdown of the game in the fourth quarter, when he received a 60-yard pass. The Houston Cougars had defeated the Arkansas Razorbacks in front of a crowd of 12,000.

Arkansas went on to have an abysmal season, and only won one other game (against the Baylor Bears) to finish with a 2–8 record. Head coach Otis Douglas resigned following the season end.

=== Oklahoma A&M ===
	1	2	3	4	Total
Houston	3	0	0	7	10
Oklahoma A&M	0	7	0	0	7

Houston traveled to Lewis Field in Stillwater, Oklahoma to meet with rivals the Oklahoma A&M Aggies (now known as the Oklahoma State Cowboys) in the Cougars' Missouri Valley Conference season opener game. It was the second meeting between the two teams, as the Aggies had traveled to Houston the season prior. In their first meeting, the Cougars defeated Oklahoma A&M with a score of 31–7. Oklahoma A&M's head coach was Jennings B. Whitworth who was in his third-year with the Aggies. The team's record for the season was a winless 0–2, where both Texas A&M and Arkansas had beaten them. Attendance for the game was 15,000.

Houston's defense shined, as they held Oklahoma A&M's offense to a combined rushing and passing total of only 62 yards. In the first quarter of the game, Verle Cray kicked a field goal to give Houston an early lead. Six fumbles by the Houston offense allowed the Aggies a chance to score a rushing touchdown in the second quarter, however it would be their only successful score of the game. A&M continued with their lead until the fourth quarter when Houston's Sam McWhirter received a touchdown pass from Clatterbuck. The victory by the Cougars helped their overall record improve to 2–1 with a conference record of 1–0, and a perfect 2–0 all-time series record against the Aggies.

=== Tulsa ===
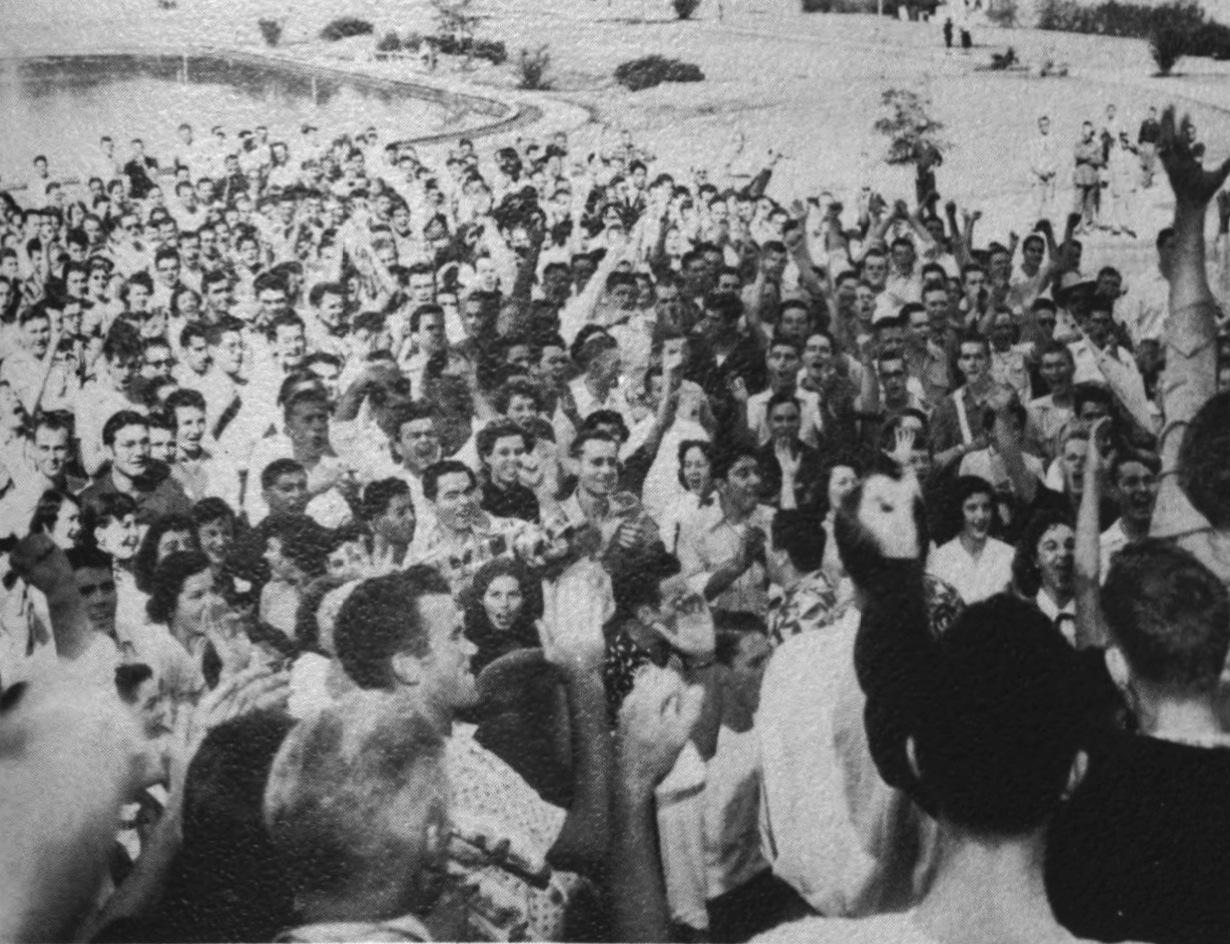
Houston students block entry to the university at the Roy G. Cullen Building following the defeat of Tulsa, declaring it a holiday

	1	2	3	4	Total
Tulsa	7	0	0	0	7
Houston	7	7	19	0	33

Houston returned to Rice Stadium in Houston for their homecoming game against another Missouri Valley Conference opponent, the Tulsa Golden Hurricane. Tulsa was heavily favored to win, as their dominant offense was considered the best in the nation and Houston's all-time series record against the Golden Hurricane was 0–2. Their coach Buddy Brothers, in his seventh year of his tenure, had led Tulsa to win the MVC championship both last season and the season before. Attendance for the game was announced as 31,000.

Houston's defense came in handy against the Golden Hurricane, as they held their highly rated offense to only 200 yards of total rushing and passing. The Cougar offense also excelled, as the victory proved to be a blowout. Houston's overall record improved to 3–1, and they moved ahead to the number one spot in the Missouri Valley Conference with a 2–0 record. Following the defeat of Tulsa, Houston students blocked all entrances to campus buildings on the following Monday and declared a holiday for the university. UH President Kemmerer condoned the action, thus making it official.

Tulsa went on to earn a respectable 8–2–1 overall record, only losing one other time to powerhouse Florida, while defeating Kansas State, Texas Tech, and Arkansas.

=== Arizona State ===
	1	2	3	4	Total
Houston	0	6	0	0	6
Arizona State	0	0	0	0	0

Houston traveled to Goodwin Stadium in Tempe, Arizona for the next game on their schedule which was a meeting with the Arizona State Sun Devils of the Border Conference. The Sun Devils were coached by first-year head coach Clyde Smith. Smith came to Arizona State from Indiana, where he had coached since 1948. Arizona State's record at this point in the season was 3–1, as they had lost to San Jose State two games prior. This was another first meeting for the Cougars, and Goodwin Stadium was filled with a sold-out crowd of 15,000.

Houston continued its winning streak against the Sun Devils. Despite only scoring six points, the Cougars managed a shutout victory by entirely holding off the Arizona State offense. Houston's offense also struggled, and gave up three fumbles in five drives. In the second quarter, linebacker Paul Carr recovered a fumble from the Sun Devils on Arizona State's seven-yard line. S.M. Meeks forced the touchdown in a rush. However, placekicker Jack Howton's attempt at an extra point was wide. This led to a lead which Houston kept for the entirety of the game.

The victory allowed for Houston to improve their overall season record to 4–1. Arizona State went on to complete its season with a 6–3 record.

=== Texas Tech ===
	1	2	3	4	Total
Houston	7	7	0	6	20
Texas Tech	0	0	7	0	7

Houston continued their next game on the road at Jones Stadium in Lubbock, Texas to face the Texas Tech Red Raiders. Like their previous opponent, Texas Tech was a member of the Border Conference. It was the Red Raiders' homecoming game, and a crowd of 18,000 was in attendance. Texas Tech's head coach was second-year DeWitt Weaver, and their record for the season thus far was 1–4. Houston was expected to continue its winning streak, and was a favorite for the game.

Houston's first two scores of the game were ultimately due to the result of intercepted passes. Texas Tech's score was in the third quarter, as Houston attempted a lateral pass that was intercepted. Houston's overall record improved to 5–1. Texas Tech's record following the season was 3–7–1.

=== Ole Miss ===
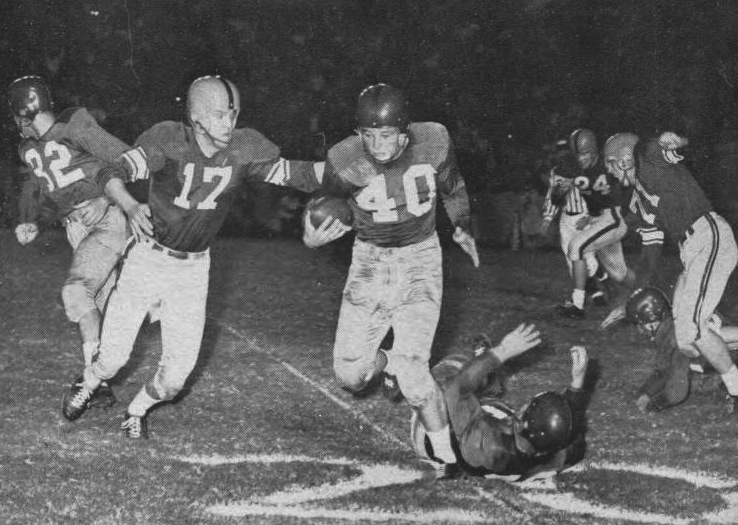
Mississippi's Reed attempts to stop Houston's Tommy Bailes

	1	2	3	4	Total
#14 Mississippi	0	6	0	0	6
Houston	0	0	0	0	0

Houston returned home to Rice Stadium for the rest of its season schedule with its next game against the nationally ranked Ole Miss of the Southeastern Conference. Johnny Vaught served as head coach for the Rebels, and was in his sixth year doing so. Having great success with a 5–0–2 record, the Rebels were nationally ranked in the AP Poll as #14. This was the second time in history that Houston had played against a nationally ranked opponent on the AP Poll, as the prior season the Cougars had been defeated by then #9 Baylor. At least two days prior to the face-off, the Gator Bowl selection committee announced that it was interested in inviting Houston to the 1953 edition of the bowl game, and that it committee members would be present for the Ole Miss game at Rice Stadium. With 34,000 fans in attendance for the game, it was Houston's second-largest home crowd at that point of the season.

The game proved to showcase defensive skill for both teams, as the only score by either team came in the second quarter from the Ole Miss Rebels, as the result of a Cougar fumble on Mississippi's 40-yard line. It had been recovered by Rebel Houston Patton. After Ole Miss drove the ball to Houston's 9-yard line, Harold Lofton rushed to gain a touchdown. However, Houston's Frank James blocked an extra point attempt to leave the score at 6–0 where it remained for the entirety of the game.

With the loss, Houston's five-game winning streak was over, and their record was worsened to 5–2. Fortunately for the team, this would be their last loss of the season. Mississippi continued their winning streak for the remainder of the regular season, suffering only one loss overall to Georgia Tech in the Sugar Bowl. Despite this, the Rebels finished the season ranked #7 in both major polls.

=== Baylor ===
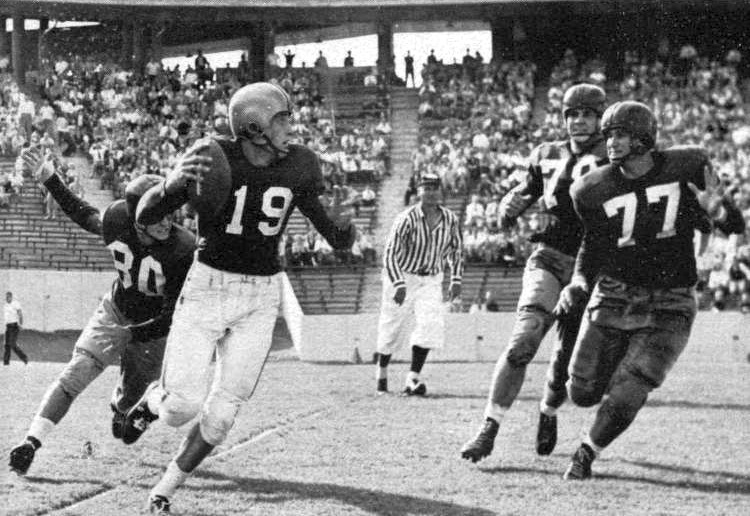
Baylor quarterback Cotton Davidson hesitates during a pass play

Coming off its second loss of the season, Houston remained at home to upset the Baylor Bears of the Southwest Conference. Coached by third-year George Sauer, Baylor held a perfect 2–0–0 all-time record against Houston. The two had last competed against each other in the previous season where Baylor was nationally ranked. Although coming to Houston with a modest 4–2–1 record, prior to the loss, the Bears were a candidate for a bowl game in the post-season. 33,000 fans were in attendance.

Following the game. The Gator Bowl selection committee made a public comment that Houston was in the running for a bid in the 1952 edition of the game. Other teams in consideration were conference mates Tulsa in addition to Syracuse and Villanova.

Two days following the win, Houston obtained a #19 ranking in the AP Poll. It was the first time the program had ever been ranked in the poll.

=== Detroit ===
With the win against Baylor, Houston entered its first game as a nationally ranked team against conference opponent Detroit. The win would secure the top spot in the Missouri Valley Conference, and bring the program its first conference title. Houston had a temperature of 40 degrees Fahrenheit with rainy conditions, and attendance suffered. Only 7,200 fans attended the event at Rice Stadium.

Led by Dutch Clark, Detroit's starting lineup included nation-leading quarterback Ted Marchibroda, who would later serve as an NFL player and head coach.

Despite achieving a victory against the Titans and improving their season record to 6–2, Houston dropped out of the AP Poll.

== Poll rankings ==
Week-to-Week Rankings Legend: ██ Increase in ranking. ██ Decrease in ranking. ██ Not ranked the previous week.
Poll	Pre	Wk 1	Wk 2	Wk 3	Wk 4	Wk 5	Wk 6	Wk 7	Wk 8	Wk 9	Final
AP	NR	NR	NR	NR	NR	NR	NR	NR	19	NR	NR

== Roster ==
1952 Houston Cougars roster
Quarterbacks: 10 Newton Shows; 18 Bobby Clatterbuck; Halfbacks: 12 Billy Polson; 20 Bobby Don Walker; 21 Ken Pridgeon; 23 Harlan Baldridge; 30 Sam McWhirter; 32 Donnie Dietrich; 34 S. M. Meeks; Fullbacks: 45 Jack Patterson; Ends: 65 Marvin Lackey; 80 Roland Johnson; 81 Howard Clapp (C); 84 Bobby Dorsey; 86 Vic Hampel; 89 Donald Folks	Guards: 60 Bob Chuoke; 61 Jack Barnes; 66 Wayne Shoemaker; 67 Verle Cray; 69 Frank James; Tackles: 71 Sanford Carr; 72 John Carroll (C); 75 Charles Linklater; 76 Gene Brown; 78 J. D. Kimmel (C); 77 M. "Buddy" Gillioz; 88 Jim McConaughey	Centers: 52 Jack Chambers; 56 Bobby Baldwin; Linebackers: 44 Paul Carr; 46 Ken Reese; 55 J. Van Haverbeke; 82 Marvin Durrenburger; 85 George Hynes; Defensive backs: 14 Jack Howton; 35 Sammy Hopson; Placekickers: 14 Jack Howton; 67 Verle Cray	Head coach: Clyde Lee; Assistant coaches: Harden Cooper – Lines coach; Lovette Hill – Ends coach; Bob Evans – Freshmen coach; Elmer Simmons – Quarterbacks/Running backs coach; Legend: (C) Team captain; All-Time Letterman; Last update: 2009

== Coaching staff ==
Lines coach Harden Cooper and backfield coach Elmer Simmons had served as players for the Tulsa Golden Hurricane for head coach Lee when he was an assistant there. Ends coach Lovette Hill attended Centenary together.

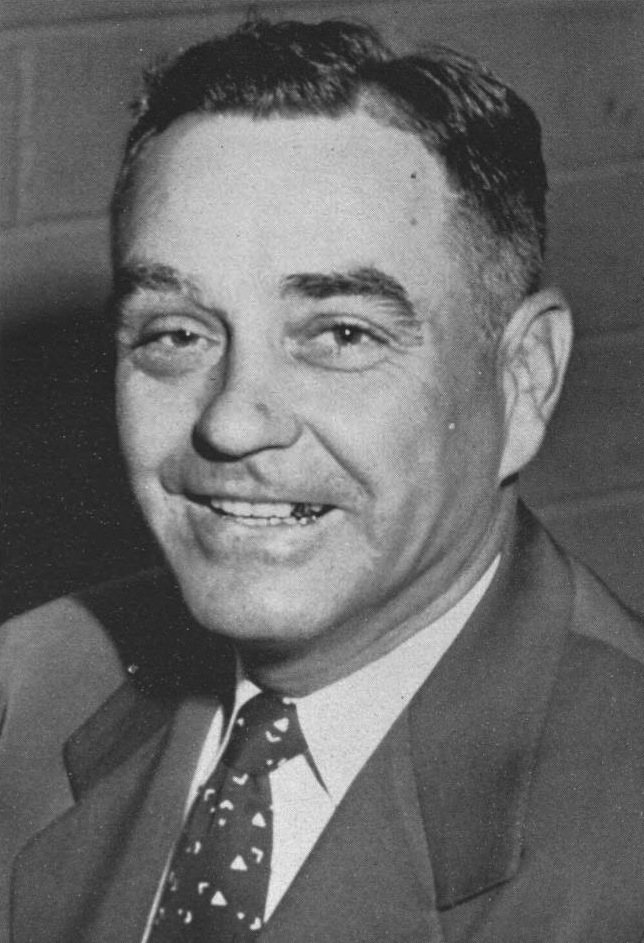
Head coach Clyde Lee

Name	Position	Alma mater (Year)	Year at Houston
Clyde Lee	Head coach	Centenary (1932)	5th
Harden Cooper	Lines coach	Tulsa (1947)	3rd
Lovette Hill	Ends coach	Centenary (1931)	4th
Elmer Simmons	Backfield coach	Tulsa (1946)	5th
Robert Evans	Freshmen coach	Texas (1939)	4th

== After the season ==
=== NFL draft ===
During the 1953 NFL draft, four Houston players were drafted. It was the third time in team history that Houston players were taken in the draft. Paul "Rock" Carr was taken by the San Francisco 49ers in the seventh round and 82nd overall, but remained as a Houston player until after the 1953 season. Senior guard Frank James was taken by the Los Angeles Rams in the fourteenth round (168th overall), end Vic Hampel was taken by the Pittsburgh Steelers in the twenty-fifth round (293rd overall), and end Jim McConaughey was taken by the Green Bay Packers in the twenty-seventh round (319th overall).

During the 1954 NFL draft, five more players from the 1952 Houston team were drafted. Tackle Maurice "Buddy" Gillioz was taken by the Los Angeles Rams in the second round (22nd overall) which was the earliest that a Houston player had been taken before. Tackle Bob Chuoke was taken by the Detroit Lions in the sixteenth round (193rd overall), back Tommy Bailes was taken by the Philadelphia Eagles in the twentieth round (237th overall), quarterback Bobby Clatterbuck was taken by the New York Giants in the twenty-seventh round (316th overall), and end Don Folks was taken by the San Francisco 49ers in the thirtieth round (359th overall).

=== Honors ===
Houston's John Carroll, Vic Hampel, and Frank James competed in the 1952 edition of the Blue–Gray Football Classic, while J. D. Kimmel was chosen to compete in the East–West Shrine Game.

J. D. Kimmel also became Houston's first All-American, when he was chosen by the Associated Press. Paul Carr also received an honorable mention by the news agency. Players chosen by the Missouri Valley Conference as all-conference selections were Vic Hampel, Bob Chuoke, S. M. Meeks, J. D. Kimmel, Buddy Gillioz, Paul Carr, Sam Hopson, and Jackie Howton.
