= 1952 Texas A&M Aggies football team =

American college football season

1952 Texas A&M Aggies football
- Conference: Southwest Conference
- Record: 3–6–1 (1–4–1 SWC)
- Head coach: Raymond George (2nd season)
- Home stadium: Kyle Field

1952 Southwest Conference football standings
	Conf.					Overall
Team	W		L		T	W		L		T
No. 10 Texas $	6	–	0	–	0	9	–	2	–	0
Rice	4	–	2	–	0	5	–	5	–	0
SMU	3	–	2	–	1	4	–	5	–	1
TCU	2	–	2	–	2	4	–	4	–	2
Baylor	1	–	3	–	2	4	–	4	–	2
Texas A&M	1	–	4	–	1	3	–	6	–	1
Arkansas	1	–	5	–	0	2	–	8	–	0
$ – Conference champion; Rankings from AP Poll

The 1952 Texas A&M Aggies football team represented Texas A&M University in the 1952 college football season as a member of the Southwest Conference (SWC). The Aggies were led by head coach Raymond George in his second season and finished with a record of three wins, six losses and one tie (3–6–1 overall, 1–4–1 in the SWC).

== Schedule ==
Date	Opponent	Site	Result	Attendance	Source
September 20	at Houston*	Rice Stadium; Houston, TX	W 21–13	50,000–54,000	
September 27	vs. Oklahoma A&M*	Cotton Bowl; Dallas, TX	W 14–7	18,000	
October 4	Kentucky*	Kyle Field; College Station, TX	L 7–10	25,000	
October 11	at No. 2 Michigan State*	Macklin Stadium; East Lansing, MI	L 6–48	49,123	
October 18	TCU	Kyle Field; College Station, TX (Rivalry)	T 7–7	20,500	
October 25	at Baylor	Baylor Stadium; Waco, TX (rivalry)	L 20–21	40,500	
November 1	Arkansas	Kyle Field; College Station, TX (Rivalry)	W 31–12	15,500	
November 8	at SMU	Cotton Bowl; Dallas, TX	L 13–21	62,000	
November 15	Rice	Kyle Field; College Station, TX	L 6–16	21,000	
November 27	at No. 10 Texas	Memorial Stadium; Austin, TX (rivalry)	L 12–32	64,000	
*Non-conference game; Rankings from AP Poll released prior to the game
