= Dan Page =

American football player (1930–1995)

No. 33
- Position: Quarterback

Personal information
- Born: October 29, 1930; Pauls Valley, Oklahoma, U.S.
- Died: November 23, 1995 (aged 65); Fort Worth, Texas, U.S.
- Listed height: 5 ft 10 in (1.78 m)
- Listed weight: 190 lb (86 kg)

Career information
- High school: Leverett's Chapel
- College: Tyler JC (1949); Texas (1951); Fort Sill (1953–1954)

Awards and highlights
- 1949 Junior College National MVP; 1949 Little All-American; 1953 All-Army Team runner-up; 1954 All-Army Team; Tyler Junior College Sports Circle of Honor Inductee (1997); 1949 Southwest Junior College Conference co-champion; 1950 Southwest Conference championship; 1953 Fourth Army football championship; 1954 Armed Forces football championship; Highest Average Gain per pass attempt in a game by a Longhorn

Claude Daniel Page (October 29, 1930 – November 23, 1995) was an All-American college football player. He was the starting quarterback at Tyler Junior College in 1949, at the Texas Longhorns in 1951 and for the Fort Sill football team in 1953-54. He was the last transfer student to start at quarterback at Texas.

== Early life ==
Dan Page was born in 1930 in Pauls Valley, Oklahoma. He played high school football at Leverett's Chapel High School.

He was the older brother of Bobby Page, who also was a star quarterback at Tyler Junior College and went on to start for Oklahoma in the early '60's. Bobby Page became the first Oklahoma Sooners quarterback to run and pass for over 100 yards in the same game.

== College football ==
At Tyler Junior College, Page was a Little All-American in 1949 and was named the Most Valuable Player in U.S. junior college football. He led Southwest Junior College Conference in passing that year, and led the team to a co-conference championship, a 10-1 record and a trip to the Texas Rose Bowl against the Fort Lewis team, which they won 40-0. He was recruited by Texas and went on to play for them in 1950 and 1951, becoming the starting quarterback by the end of his senior year. He is the last transfer, junior college or otherwise, to start at quarterback at Texas.

In 1950, Page was the backup quarterback to Ben Tompkins, but managed to play in every game as either quarterback or defensive back. The team went 9-2, won the Southwest Conference championship and lost to Tennessee in the Cotton Bowl.

In 1951, the first season with coach Ed Price, Page was set to compete with T Jones and Tompkins for the starting role. But when Tompkins left in the winter to play professional baseball, Jones got the start in the opener. Page saw some playing time in the early games as Texas climbed to #4 in the rankings. Then they were upset by Arkansas, a team they had not lost to since 1938. In that game Jones and Page combined for 1-12 passing, with Page making the only completion, and lost by 2 on a Pat Summerall field goal. Jones started the following game against Rice, but Page led the Longhorns to the win and took over as starter for the rest of the season. After beating SMU, Texas lost to #16 Baylor for the first time since 1938. The following week, Page led Texas to an upset of #12 TCU, throwing for 175 yards and 2 touchdowns to set a pair school records, including the record for most yards gained per pass attempt - which he still holds. In the final game, Texas needed to beat Texas A&M for a share of the conference title and a trip to the Orange Bowl, but despite 150 yards passing by Page, Texas was upset 22-21 and beaten by A&M for the first time since 1939.

Immediately following the 1951 season, Page was briefly involved in a recruiting scandal involving former Kansas State coach Ralph Graham. Graham said that Kansas State had given money to a Tyler Junior College player, in violation of the rules, who chose to go to Texas and so attention immediately turned to Page. However, a few days later, Tyler JC coach Floyd Wagstaff identified the player as Alvin Beal, and Graham confirmed it. Beal did not got to Texas but instead went into the army and denied ever being paid.

After graduation, Page went to Fort Sill, OK to fulfill his military service commitment. He played for the Fort Sill football team and led them to the Fourth Army football championship in 1953 and was named to the All-Army team that year. In 1954, he led Fort Sill to a victory over Bolling Air Force Base in the Poinsettia Bowl and thus the Armed Forces Football Championship.

=== Records ===
- UT - Highest Average Gain per pass completion, game (min 5. completions) (29.2), surpassed by Robert Brewer in 1982
- (Active) UT - Highest Average Gain per pass attempt, game (min 7 attempts) (25.0)

== Later life ==
After completing his military service, Page moved from Fort Sill, Oklahoma to Fort Worth, Texas. From 1962 to 1968, he worked with Southwestern Bell Yellow Pages and then he became founder, owner, president and publisher of Executive Data Services, Suburban Yellow Pages in 1970 in Dallas. He died on November 23, 1995.
