= 1952 Arkansas Razorbacks football team =

American college football season

1952 Arkansas Razorbacks football
- Conference: Southwest Conference
- Record: 2–8 (1–5 SWC)
- Head coach: Otis Douglas (3rd season)
- Captains: Dean Pryor; Buddy Sutton
- Home stadium: Razorback Stadium; War Memorial Stadium

1952 Southwest Conference football standings
	Conf.					Overall
Team	W		L		T	W		L		T
No. 10 Texas $	6	–	0	–	0	9	–	2	–	0
Rice	4	–	2	–	0	5	–	5	–	0
SMU	3	–	2	–	1	4	–	5	–	1
TCU	2	–	2	–	2	4	–	4	–	2
Baylor	1	–	3	–	2	4	–	4	–	2
Texas A&M	1	–	4	–	1	3	–	6	–	1
Arkansas	1	–	5	–	0	2	–	8	–	0
$ – Conference champion; Rankings from AP Poll

The 1952 Arkansas Razorbacks football team represented the University of Arkansas in the Southwest Conference (SWC) during the 1952 college football season. In their third and final year under head coach Otis Douglas, the Razorbacks compiled a 2–8 record (1–5 against SWC opponents), finished in last place in the SWC, and were outscored by their opponents by a combined total of 282 to 166.

== Schedule ==
Date	Opponent	Site	Result	Attendance	Source
September 20	Oklahoma A&M*	War Memorial Stadium; Little Rock, AR	W 22–20	22,000	
September 27	Houston*	Razorback Stadium; Fayetteville, AR	L 7–17	12,000	
October 4	at TCU	Amon G. Carter Stadium; Fort Worth, TX	L 7–13	22,000	
October 11	Baylor	War Memorial Stadium; Little Rock, AR	W 20–17	25,000	
October 18	at Texas	Memorial Stadium; Austin, TX (rivalry)	L 7–44	44,000	
October 25	Ole Miss*	War Memorial Stadium; Little Rock, AR (rivalry)	L 7–34	28,000	
November 1	at Texas A&M	Kyle Field; College Station, TX (rivalry)	L 12–31	15,500	
November 8	Rice	Razorback Stadium; Fayetteville, AR	L 33–35	14,500	
November 15	SMU	Razorback Stadium; Fayetteville, AR	L 17–27	20,000	
November 22	at Tulsa*	Skelly Stadium; Tulsa, OK	L 34–44	12,500	
*Non-conference game
