= 1952 Rice Owls football team =

American college football season

1952 Rice Owls football
- Conference: Southwest Conference
- Record: 5–5 (4–2 SWC)
- Head coach: Jess Neely (13th season)
- Home stadium: Rice Stadium

1952 Southwest Conference football standings
| | Conf. | | | | | Overall |
| Team | W | | L | | T | W | | L | | T |
|---|---|---|---|---|---|---|---|---|---|---|
| No. 10 Texas $ | 6 | – | 0 | – | 0 | 9 | – | 2 | – | 0 |
| Rice | 4 | – | 2 | – | 0 | 5 | – | 5 | – | 0 |
| SMU | 3 | – | 2 | – | 1 | 4 | – | 5 | – | 1 |
| TCU | 2 | – | 2 | – | 2 | 4 | – | 4 | – | 2 |
| Baylor | 1 | – | 3 | – | 2 | 4 | – | 4 | – | 2 |
| Texas A&M | 1 | – | 4 | – | 1 | 3 | – | 6 | – | 1 |
| Arkansas | 1 | – | 5 | – | 0 | 2 | – | 8 | – | 0 |
$ – Conference champion; Rankings from AP Poll

The 1952 Rice Owls football team represented Rice Institute during the 1952 college football season. The Owls were led by 13th-year head coach Jess Neely and played their home games at Rice Stadium in Houston, Texas. The team competed as members of the Southwest Conference, finishing in second.

== Schedule ==
| Date | Opponent | Rank | Site | Result | Attendance | Source |
|---|---|---|---|---|---|---|
| September 27 | Texas Tech* | | Rice Stadium; Houston, TX | W 34–7 | 37,000 | |
| October 4 | LSU* | No. 17 | Rice Stadium; Houston, TX | L 7–27 | 45,000 | |
| October 11 | at No. 11 UCLA* | | Los Angeles Memorial Coliseum; Los Angeles, CA | L 0–20 | 30,926 | |
| October 18 | SMU | | Rice Stadium; Houston, TX (rivalry) | L 14–21 | 56,000 | |
| October 25 | No. 20 Texas | | Rice Stadium; Houston, TX (rivalry) | L 7–20 | 66,000 | |
| November 1 | No. 18 Wisconsin* | | Rice Stadium; Houston, TX | L 7–21 | 36,000 | |
| November 8 | at Arkansas | | Razorback Stadium; Fayetteville, AR | W 35–33 | 14,500 | |
| November 15 | at Texas A&M | | Kyle Field; College Station, TX | W 16–6 | 21,000 | |
| November 22 | TCU | | Rice Stadium; Houston, TX | W 12–6 | 30,000 | |
| November 29 | at Baylor | | Baylor Stadium; Waco, TX | W 20–14 | 10,000 | |
*Non-conference game; Rankings from AP Poll released prior to the game
