= 1952 TCU Horned Frogs football team =

American college football season

1952 TCU Horned Frogs football
- Conference: Southwest Conference
- Record: 4–4–2 (2–2–2 SWC)
- Head coach: Dutch Meyer (19th season)
- Offensive scheme: Meyer spread
- Home stadium: Amon G. Carter Stadium

1952 Southwest Conference football standings
	Conf.					Overall
Team	W		L		T	W		L		T
No. 10 Texas $	6	–	0	–	0	9	–	2	–	0
Rice	4	–	2	–	0	5	–	5	–	0
SMU	3	–	2	–	1	4	–	5	–	1
TCU	2	–	2	–	2	4	–	4	–	2
Baylor	1	–	3	–	2	4	–	4	–	2
Texas A&M	1	–	4	–	1	3	–	6	–	1
Arkansas	1	–	5	–	0	2	–	8	–	0
$ – Conference champion; Rankings from AP Poll

The 1952 TCU Horned Frogs football team represented Texas Christian University (TCU) in the 1952 college football season. The Horned Frogs finished the season 4–4–2 overall and 2–2–2 in the Southwest Conference. The team was coached by Dutch Meyer in his nineteenth and final year as head coach. The Frogs played their home games in Amon G. Carter Stadium, which is located on campus in Fort Worth, Texas.

== Schedule ==
Date	Opponent	Rank	Site	TV	Result	Attendance	Source
September 20	at No. 17 Kansas*	No. 9	Memorial Stadium; Lawrence, KS	NBC	L 0–13	25,000	
September 27	at No. 18 UCLA*	No. 9	Los Angeles Memorial Coliseum; Los Angeles, CA		L 0–14	34,158	
October 4	Arkansas		Amon G. Carter Stadium; Fort Worth, TX		W 13–7	22,000	
October 11	at Trinity (TX)*		Alamo Stadium; San Antonio, TX		W 47–0	8,250	
October 18	at Texas A&M		Kyle Field; College Station, TX (rivalry)		T 7–7	20,500	
November 1	Baylor		Amon G. Carter Stadium; Fort Worth, TX (rivalry)		T 20–20	27,000	
November 8	Wake Forest*		Amon G. Carter Stadium; Fort Worth, TX		W 27–9	12,000	
November 15	No. 9 Texas		Amon G. Carter Stadium; Fort Worth, TX (rivalry)		L 7–14	32,000	
November 22	at Rice		Rice Stadium; Houston, TX		L 6–12	30,000	
November 29	at SMU		Cotton Bowl; Dallas, TX (rivalry)		W 14–7	32,000	
*Non-conference game; Rankings from AP Poll released prior to the game
