= Harden Cooper =

American football player and coach (1922–1990)

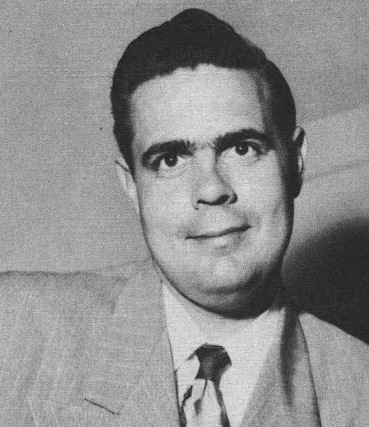
- Cooper, c. 1951

Biographical details
- Born: August 6, 1922; Wills Point, Texas, U.S.
- Died: December 5, 1990 (aged 68); Smith County, Texas, U.S.

Playing career
- 1946–1947: Tulsa
- Position: Tackle

Coaching career (HC unless noted)
- 1947: Tulsa (freshmen)
- 1948–1949: Mineola HS (TX)
- 1950–1954: Houston (line)
- 1956–1958: Baylor (DL)
- 1959–1969: Brazosport HS (TX)
- 1970–1972: Alvin HS (TX)

Harden Fenimore Cooper Jr. (August 6, 1922 – December 5, 1990) was an American football player and coach who served as an assistant for several college programs, and was the head coach of Brazosport High School in Freeport, Texas, where he led the team to the 1965 state AAAA semifinals. In high school, Cooper played for Mineola High School, and then played for Kilgore College. He later transferred to Tulsa, and was drafted by the Chicago Cardinals in the 13th round of the 1947 NFL draft. Instead of a professional playing career, he opted to become a coach. He later served as lines coach for Houston and defensive line coach for Baylor before finishing his coaching career as a high school head coach. He died in 1990.

== See also ==
- 1952 Houston Cougars football team
