= 1952 Baylor Bears football team =

American college football season

1952 Baylor Bears football
- Conference: Southwest Conference
- Record: 4–4–2 (1–3–2 SWC)
- Head coach: George Sauer (3rd season)
- Captains: Dick Parma; C. O. Brocato
- Home stadium: Baylor Stadium

1952 Southwest Conference football standings
	Conf.					Overall
Team	W		L		T	W		L		T
No. 10 Texas $	6	–	0	–	0	9	–	2	–	0
Rice	4	–	2	–	0	5	–	5	–	0
SMU	3	–	2	–	1	4	–	5	–	1
TCU	2	–	2	–	2	4	–	4	–	2
Baylor	1	–	3	–	2	4	–	4	–	2
Texas A&M	1	–	4	–	1	3	–	6	–	1
Arkansas	1	–	5	–	0	2	–	8	–	0
$ – Conference champion; Rankings from AP Poll

The 1952 Baylor Bears football team represented Baylor University in the 1952 college football season. They finished with a 4-4-2 record and placed fifth in the Southwest Conference for the year. Four players – Jack Sisco (center), Robert Knowles (tackle), Bill Athey (guard) and Jerry Coody (back) – were selected as All-Conference players.

== Schedule ==
Date	Opponent	Site	Result	Attendance	Source
September 20	Wake Forest*	Baylor Stadium; Waco, TX	W 17–14	16,000	
October 4	Washington State*	Baylor Stadium; Waco, TX	W 31–7	17,000	
October 11	at Arkansas	War Memorial Stadium; Little Rock, AR	L 17–20	25,000	
October 18	at Texas Tech*	Jones Stadium; Lubbock, TX (rivalry)	W 21–10	15,500–20,000	
October 25	Texas A&M^{†}	Baylor Stadium; Waco, TX (rivalry)	W 21–20	40,500	
November 1	at TCU	Amon G. Carter Stadium; Fort Worth, TX (rivalry)	T 20–20	27,000	
November 8	No. 13 Texas	Baylor Stadium; Waco, TX (rivalry)	L 33–35	32,000	
November 15	at Houston*	Rice Stadium; Houston, TX (rivalry)	L 6–28	30,000	
November 22	at SMU	Cotton Bowl; Dallas, TX	T 7–7	30,000	
November 29	Rice	Baylor Stadium; Waco, TX	L 14–20	10,000	
*Non-conference game; ^{†}Homecoming; Rankings from AP Poll released prior to the game
