= Gib Dawson =

American football player (1930–2005)

No. 26
- Positions: Halfback, Return specialist, Punter, Placekicker

Personal information
- Born: August 27, 1930; Bisbee, Arizona, U.S.
- Died: July 30, 2005 (aged 74); Phoenix, Arizona, U.S.
- Listed height: 5 ft 11 in (1.80 m)
- Listed weight: 190 lb (86 kg)

Career information
- High school: Douglas (Arizona)
- College: Texas
- NFL draft: 1953: 4th round, 44th overall pick

Career history
- Green Bay Packers (1953)

Awards and highlights
- 2× First-team All-SWC (1951, 1952); 1953 Cotton Bowl Classic Champion; Southwest Conference Champion (1950, 1952); Keagle Memorial Award (August 1953)

Career NFL statistics
- Rushing yards: 18
- Rushing average: 3.6
- Return yards: 174
- Total touchdowns: 1
- Stats at Pro Football Reference

Gilbert Henry "Gib" Dawson (August 27, 1930 – July 30, 2005) was a former halfback at the University of Texas, where he still holds the school record for highest average gain per play in a single game, and in the National Football League (NFL).

== Early life ==
Dawson was born in Bisbee, Arizona and became a high school football star in Douglas, AZ where he played halfback, punter and placekicker. He was a highly sought recruit garnering attention from Arizona, Texas, Oklahoma, Notre Dame and USC, among others. He earned all-state honors and in 1948 was named captain of the Arizona All State team.

He also ran track for Douglass and played outfield for their baseball team.

He's a member of the Arizona High School Football Hall of Fame, was recognized as one of Arizona's 100 greatest athletes of the 20th Century and 50 Greatest Athletes of all time and had his high school jersey retired in 1979.

In 2023, the town of Douglass named September 1st Gib Dawson Day.

== College Career ==
Dawson played college football at the University of Texas from 1950 to 1952.

In his sophomore season he played in 9 games, amassing 313 rushing yards on 76 carries with a TD; 126 receiving yards on 7 catches with 2 TDs; 117 kick-off return yards on 5 returns and 78 punt return yards on 4 returns for 634 all-purpose yards. He helped the Longhorns win the Southwest Conference Championship, finish the season ranked #2 and go to the 1951 Cotton Bowl Classic, which they lost to Tennessee. The team came one missed extra point, against eventual national champion Oklahoma, away from going undefeated and possibly winning a share of the National Championship.

In 1951, he was named all-Southwest Conference and led the league in scoring with 62 points. He led the team in total offense (714 yards), scoring, receiving (8 catches for 170 yards and 3 TDs), rushing (74 carries for 671 yards and 6 TDs) and all purpose yards (939, including rushing, passing and 98 yards in kick returns) despite missing the game against Oklahoma to attend his father's funeral. He also went 3-7 on passing for 43 yards with one interception and went 8 for 14 on extra points. Against the North Carolina Tarheels, he and Richard Ochoa became the first pair to rush for 100 yards in a single game in school history. In that same game he set the school record for highest average gain per play in a single game with 14.4 yards per play. The Longhorns went 7-3, finished 3rd in the Southwest Conference and were ranked all season but fell out of the rankings - and a chance at an Orange Bowl invite - in the last poll after falling to Texas A&M by a missed FG, despite Dawson putting up a career-high 158 yards rushing. It was the 3rd of his five 100 yard rushing games.

He was again named an all-Southwest Conference running back in 1952. That year he competed in all 10 games and again led the team in All-purpose with 1,111 yards, a school record at the time. He had 649 yards on 131 carries with 6 TDs; 167 receiving yards on 11 receptions; went 5-9 on passes for 104 yards; had 211 yards on 10 kick off returns and had 84 yards on 7 punt returns. He also went 26 for 30 on extra points and 3-3 on field goals, had 3 punts for 93 yards and got a fumble recovery. Against Texas A&M he, Billy Quinn and James "T" Jones teamed up for the first game in school history where the Longhorns had three 100-yard rushers (a feat only accomplished one other time). That season he led the Longhorns in all-purpose yards with a total of 1,160 yards. He helped the team win the Southwest Conference Championship again and to avenge themselves against Tennessee in the 1953 Cotton Bowl Classic in which he scored the team's first touchdown.

He is the only Texas player ever to lead the Longhorns in five different offensive categories in the same season. When he graduated he had the 2nd most career rushing yards (1,724) in school history behind his teammate Byron Townsend.

The summer after the season was over, he played in the College All-Star game against the World Champion Detroit Lions and was named the Most Valuable Player. For his performance he also won the Merle Keagle Memorial Award - an Arizona Athlete of the Month Award - for August 1953.

He was named to the Texas Longhorn Hall of Honor in 1984.

== Pro Career ==
Dawson was drafted by the Green Bay Packers in the fourth round of the 1953 NFL draft and played for them as both a return specialist and running back. Over 7 games (of a 12 game season), he had just 18 yards rushing on 5 attempts with 1 fumble, but as a returner he had 7 punt returns for 72 yards, including a 60 yard return for a touchdown, one of only 4 PR TDs in the NFL that season. He also had 4 KR for 102 yards.

Following the season, he returned to Texas for a game between current players and alumni.

After a season with the Packers, Dawson's career was ended early when he was drafted into the Army. He then re-entered the University of Texas to take R.O.T.C. training and left the Army in 1955 as a 1st Lieutenant.

== Later life ==
After being discharged from the Army, Dawson went into business working as a general manager at United Liquor Company and later at Circle K Corporation eventually becoming an executive with the Circle K Corporation in Tucson and Phoenix, AZ. He had three children.

Dawson died on July 30, 2005 at his home in Phoenix.
