= 1952 Wichita Shockers football team =

American college football season

1952 Wichita Shockers football
- Conference: Missouri Valley Conference
- Record: 3–6–1 (0–3 MVC)
- Head coach: Bob Carlson (2nd season)
- Home stadium: Veterans Field

1952 Missouri Valley Conference football standings
	Conf.					Overall
Team	W		L		T	W		L		T
Houston $	3	–	0	–	0	8	–	2	–	0
No. 12 Tulsa	3	–	1	–	0	8	–	2	–	1
Oklahoma A&M	2	–	2	–	0	3	–	7	–	0
Detroit	1	–	3	–	0	2	–	7	–	0
Wichita	0	–	3	–	0	3	–	6	–	1
$ – Conference champion; Rankings from AP Poll

The 1952 Wichita Shockers football team, sometimes known as the Wheatshockers, was an American football team that represented Wichita University (now known as Wichita State University) as a member of the Missouri Valley Conference during the 1952 college football season. In its second and final season under head coach Bob Carlson, the team compiled a 3–6–1 record (0–3 against conference opponents), finished last out of five teams in the MVC, and was outscored by a total of 235 to 159. The team played its home games at Veterans Field, now known as Cessna Stadium.

== Schedule ==
Date	Time	Opponent	Site	Result	Attendance	Source
September 20		Boston University*	Veterans Field; Wichita, KS	L 0–6	12,500	
September 26		at Detroit	University of Detroit Stadium; Detroit, MI	L 7–22	13,521	
October 4		at Bradley*	Peoria, IL	W 13–0		
October 11		Oklahoma A&M	Veterans Field; Wichita, KS	L 21–35		
October 18		at Miami (OH)*	Miami Field; Oxford, OH	L 7–56		
October 25		at Tulsa	Skelly Field; Tulsa, OK	L 0–28	12,500	
November 1		Utah State*	Veterans Field; Wichita, KS	T 20–20		
November 7		Carswell Air Force Base*	Veterans Field; Wichita, KS	L 16–48		
November 15	1:30 p.m.	at Drake*	Drake Stadium; Des Moines, IA	W 41–14	2,500	
November 27	2:30 p.m.	New Mexico A&M*	Veterans Field; Wichita, KS	W 34–6	3,000	
*Non-conference game; All times are in Central time
