= J. D. Kimmel =

American football player (1929–2008)

J.D. Kimmel
No. 76, 72
- Position: Defensive tackle

Personal information
- Born: September 30, 1929; Omaha, Nebraska, U.S.
- Died: November 24, 2008 (aged 79); Houston, Texas, U.S.
- Listed height: 6 ft 2 in (1.88 m)
- Listed weight: 248 lb (112 kg)

Career information
- High school: Texas (Texarkana, Texas)
- College: Army (1949–1950); Houston (1951–1952)
- NFL draft: 1952: 11th round, 129th overall pick

Career history
- Washington Redskins (1955–1956); Green Bay Packers (1958)

Awards and highlights
- First-team All-American (1952); First-team All-Eastern (1950)

Career NFL statistics
- Fumble recoveries: 4
- Stats at Pro Football Reference

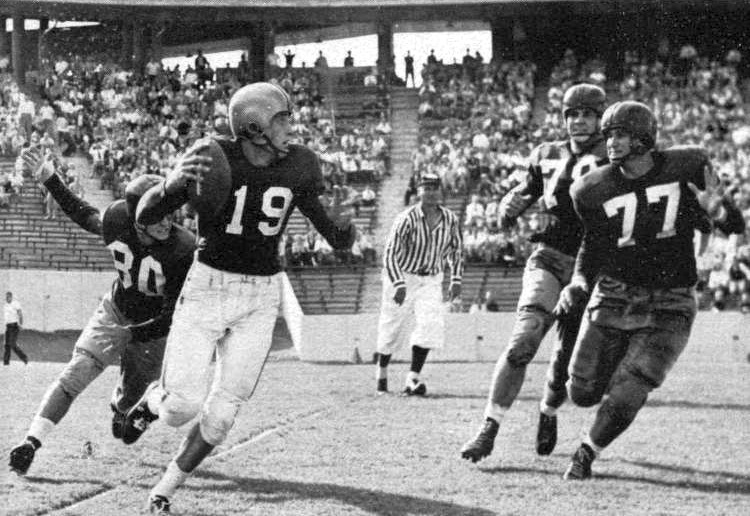
J. D. Kimmel playing in 1952 (number 78)

J.D. Kimmel (September 30, 1929 – November 24, 2008) was an American professional football defensive tackle in the National Football League (NFL) for the Washington Redskins and the Green Bay Packers. He started his football career playing at Texas High School. He attended the University of Houston and the United States Military Academy. At Houston, Kimmel became the team's first All-American in 1952, and was later inducted into the Houston Cougars Hall of Honor in 1973.

After completing his undergraduate education at the University of Houston in 1952, Kimmel spent two years in the United States Army. He then spent four years in the National Football League – three years with the Washington Redskins, and one year with the Green Bay Packers. He married Patricia Kirk in November 1957, had two daughters and five grandchildren.

After retiring from professional football, Kimmel came back to Houston, received a master's degree in petroleum engineering from Rice University and became a prominent and well-respected businessman. He founded and operated several successful engineering and manufacturing companies based in the Houston area. He received the University of Houston's Distinguished Engineering Award in 1999.

== See also ==
- 1952 Houston Cougars football team
- 1955 Washington Redskins season
- 1956 Washington Redskins season
- 1958 Green Bay Packers season
