= Dean Pryor =

American football player, coach, and decathlete (1930–2019)

Biographical details
- Born: November 22, 1930; Corning, Kansas, U.S.
- Died: March 4, 2019 (aged 88)

Playing career

Football
- 1950–1952: Arkansas

Track
- 1951–1953: Arkansas
- Positions: Running back (football); Decathlon (track)

Coaching career (HC unless noted)

Football
- 1956: Lakeland HS (FL) (assistant)
- 1957–1959: Coffeyville (assistant)
- 1960–1961: Coffeyville
- 1962–1963: Wichita (backfield)
- 1964–1966: Hastings
- 1967–1969: Kansas State (assistant)
- 1970–1971: South Dakota State

Track
- 1957–1961: Coffeyville

Administrative career (AD unless noted)
- 1975–1979: Arkansas State

Head coaching record
- Overall: 18–28–1 (college football); 15–7 (junior college football)

Richard Dean Pryor (November 22, 1930 – March 4, 2019) was an American football player and coach, track coach, decathlete, and college athletics administrator. He served as the head football coach at Hastings College in Hastings, Nebraska from 1964 to 1966 and South Dakota State University from 1970 to 1971, comping a career college football head coaching record of 18–28–1. Prior was also the head football coach at Coffeyville Junior College—now known as Coffeyville Community College—in Coffeyville, Kansas from 1960 to 1961 and the school's head track coach from 1957 to 1961.

Pryor played high school football Fredonia High School in Fredonia, Kansas and college football at the University of Arkansas from 1950 to 1952. As a senior, he was co-captain of 1952 Arkansas Razorbacks football team. In 1952, he participated in the United States Olympic Trials in the decathlon, finishing in eighth place.

As head football coach at Coffeyville, Pryor lead his team to records of 6–5 in 1960 and 9–2 in 1961. He left Coffeyville in 1962 to become backfield coach at the Municipal University of Wichita—now known as Wichita State University—under head football coach Marcelino Huerta.

== Head coaching record ==
=== College football ===
Year	Team	Overall	Conference	Standing	Bowl/playoffs
Hastings Broncos (Great Plains College Association / Nebraska College Conference) (1964–1966)
1964	Hastings	6–3	2–1 / 2–2	2nd / 3rd	
Hastings Broncos (Nebraska College Conference) (1965–1966)
1965	Hastings	4–6	1–3	4th	
1966	Hastings	3–4–1	2–2	3rd	
Hastings:		13–13–1	7–8		
South Dakota State Jackrabbits (North Central Conference) (1970–1971)
1970	South Dakota State	2–8	1–5	T–6th	
1971	South Dakota State	3–7	2–4	6th	
South Dakota State:		5–15	3–9		
Total:		18–28–1			

=== Junior college football ===
Year	Team	Overall	Conference	Standing	Bowl/playoffs
Coffeyville Red Ravens (Kansas Junior College Conference) (1960–1961)
1960	Coffeyville	6–5	5–3	T–3rd	
1961	Coffeyville	9–2	7–1	2nd	
Coffeyville:		15–7	12–4		
Total:		15–7			
