= 1952 Oklahoma A&M Cowboys football team =

American college football season

1952 Oklahoma A&M Cowboys football
- Conference: Missouri Valley Conference
- Record: 3–7 (2–2 MVC)
- Head coach: Jennings B. Whitworth (3rd season)
- Home stadium: Lewis Field

1952 Missouri Valley Conference football standings
| | Conf. | | | | | Overall |
| Team | W | | L | | T | W | | L | | T |
|---|---|---|---|---|---|---|---|---|---|---|
| Houston $ | 3 | – | 0 | – | 0 | 8 | – | 2 | – | 0 |
| No. 12 Tulsa | 3 | – | 1 | – | 0 | 8 | – | 2 | – | 1 |
| Oklahoma A&M | 2 | – | 2 | – | 0 | 3 | – | 7 | – | 0 |
| Detroit | 1 | – | 3 | – | 0 | 2 | – | 7 | – | 0 |
| Wichita | 0 | – | 3 | – | 0 | 3 | – | 6 | – | 1 |
$ – Conference champion; Rankings from AP Poll

The 1952 Oklahoma A&M Cowboys football team represented Oklahoma Agricultural and Mechanical College (later renamed Oklahoma State University–Stillwater) in the Missouri Valley Conference during the 1952 college football season. In their third season under head coach Jennings B. Whitworth, the Cowboys compiled a 3–7 record (2–2 against conference opponents), finished in third place in the conference, and were outscored by opponents by a combined total of 178 to 146.

On offense, the 1952 team averaged 14.6 points scored, 130.9 rushing yards, and 100.3 passing yards per game. On defense, the team allowed an average of 17.8 points scored, 171.8 rushing yards and 122.6 passing yards per game. The team's statistical leaders included Ron Bennett with 393 rushing yards, Don Babers with 493 passing yards, and John Weigle with 314 receiving yards.

Center F. A. Dry and tackle Lew Zeigler received first-team All-Missouri Valley Conference honors.

The team played its home games at Lewis Field in Stillwater, Oklahoma.

== Schedule ==
| Date | Opponent | Site | Result | Attendance | Source |
|---|---|---|---|---|---|
| September 20 | at Arkansas* | War Memorial Stadium; Little Rock, AR | L 20–22 | 22,000 | |
| September 27 | vs. Texas A&M* | Cotton Bowl; Dallas, TX | L 7–14 | 18,000 | |
| October 4 | Houston | Lewis Field; Stillwater, OK (rivalry) | L 7–10 | 15,000 | |
| October 11 | at Wichita | Veterans Field; Wichita, KS | W 35–21 | | |
| October 18 | Missouri*^{†} | Lewis Field; Stillwater, OK | W 14–7 | | |
| October 25 | Detroit | Lewis Field; Stillwater, OK | W 21–6 | 13,000 | |
| November 1 | at Tulsa | Skelly Field; Tulsa, OK (rivalry) | L 21–23 | 20,000 | |
| November 15 | at Kansas* | Memorial Stadium; Lawrence, KS | L 7–21 | 20,000 | |
| November 22 | Washington State* | Lewis Field; Stillwater, OK | L 7–9 | 14,000 | |
| November 29 | No. 4 Oklahoma* | Lewis Field; Stillwater, OK (Bedlam) | L 7–54 | 21,408 | |
*Non-conference game; ^{†}Homecoming; Rankings from AP Poll released prior to the game
