= 1952 Detroit Titans football team =

American college football season

1952 Detroit Titans football
- Conference: Missouri Valley Conference
- Record: 3–6 (1–3 MVC)
- Head coach: Dutch Clark (2nd season)
- Captains: Peter Bonnani; John Koster
- Home stadium: University of Detroit Stadium

1952 Missouri Valley Conference football standings
	Conf.					Overall
Team	W		L		T	W		L		T
Houston $	3	–	0	–	0	8	–	2	–	0
No. 12 Tulsa	3	–	1	–	0	8	–	2	–	1
Oklahoma A&M	2	–	2	–	0	3	–	7	–	0
Detroit	1	–	3	–	0	2	–	7	–	0
Wichita	0	–	3	–	0	3	–	6	–	1
$ – Conference champion; Rankings from AP Poll

The 1952 Detroit Titans football team represented the University of Detroit in the Missouri Valley Conference (MVC) during the 1952 college football season. In its second year under head coach Dutch Clark, Detroit compiled finished with a 3–6 record (1–3 against conference opponents), finished fourth in the MVC, and was outscored by all opponents by a combined total of 224 to 206.

Ted Marchibroda, who later spent more than 40 years in the NFL as a player and coach, was the team's starting quarterback. Marchibroda led the nation with 1,813 yards of total offense in 1952, which included 1,637 passing yards. On November 14, in his last home game for the Titans, Marchibroda set a new national, single-game record with 390 passing yards.

The team's staff included Wally Fromhart (backfield coach), Bill Pritula (line coach), Edmund J. Barbour (freshmen coach), and Dr. Raymond D. Forsyth (trainer). The team's co-captains were fullback Richard John Koster and end Peter Bonnani.

== Schedule ==
Date	Opponent	Site	Result	Attendance	Source
September 26	Wichita	University of Detroit Stadium; Detroit, MI	W 22–7	13,625	
October 4	No. 12 Villanova*	University of Detroit Stadium; Detroit, MI	L 7–21	13,521	
October 11	Marquette*	University of Detroit Stadium; Detroit, MI	L 27–37	12,289	
October 18	Drake*	University of Detroit Stadium; Detroit, MI	W 57–0	8,000	
October 25	at Oklahoma A&M	Lewis Field; Stillwater, OK	L 6–21	13,000	
November 1	at Fordham*	Triborough Stadium; New York, NY	W 28–20	6,033	
November 7	Boston College*	University of Detroit Stadium; Detroit, MI	L 20–23	12,280	
November 14	Tulsa	University of Detroit Stadium; Detroit, MI	L 21–62	13,120	
November 29	at No. 19 Houston	Rice Stadium; Houston TX	L 19–33	7,200	
*Non-conference game; Rankings from AP Poll released prior to the game

== Roster ==
- #62 Richard Abel, end
- #53 Marion Balcerzak, center
- #34 Edmund Beirne, end
- #48 Joseph Belluso, guard
- #6 Thomas Berry, fullback
- #64 Peter Bonanni, end and co-captain
- #18 Gene Bradshaw, end
- #4 Robert Burgmeier, halfback
- #38 Chuck Carter, center
- #69 Daniel Comer, tackle
- #73 Harry Derderian, tackle
- #63 John Drahos, end
- #43 John Eckenstein, end
- #57 Martin Foley, guard
- #72 Morgan Foley, tackle
- #47 Al Galuardi, end
- #68 Chuck Gardella, guard
- #22 Edward Gornak, halfback
- #61 Robert Hernbroth, guard
- #7 David Kline, quarterback
- #20 Charles Knoch, halfback
- #55 Richard Koster, fullback and co-captain
- #54 Donald Kozischeck, guard
- #71 Casimir Krol, tackle
- #28 Ted Marchibroda, quarterback
- #74 Terry Martin, tackle
- #70 Richard Martwick, tackle
- #12 Shawn McAlinden, quarterback
- #30 Dennis McCotter, fullback
- #13 Tim Moriarty, tackle
- #33 James O'Leary, halfback
- #44 Leon Riley, halfback
- #66 Ed Sawicki, center
- #19 Edward Sheldon, halfback
- #42 David Shounhard, center
- #60 Roger Stemler, guard
- #26 John Thiel, halfback
- #41 Leon Theisen, tackle
- #32 Vic Thomas, end
- #37 Stan Tubinis, halfback
- #65 Tony Viola, end
- #17 Frank Willard, halfback
- #49 William Walsh, guard
- #67 Lou Wasko, center
- #56 Edward Yablonski, halfback
- #3 Ray Zambiasi, fullback
- #11 Tom Zang, quarterback
