= 1952 SMU Mustangs football team =

American college football season

1952 SMU Mustangs football
- Conference: Southwest Conference
- Record: 4–5–1 (3–2–1 SWC)
- Head coach: Rusty Russell (3rd season)
- Captain: Bill Forester
- Home stadium: Cotton Bowl

1952 Southwest Conference football standings
	Conf.					Overall
Team	W		L		T	W		L		T
No. 10 Texas $	6	–	0	–	0	9	–	2	–	0
Rice	4	–	2	–	0	5	–	5	–	0
SMU	3	–	2	–	1	4	–	5	–	1
TCU	2	–	2	–	2	4	–	4	–	2
Baylor	1	–	3	–	2	4	–	4	–	2
Texas A&M	1	–	4	–	1	3	–	6	–	1
Arkansas	1	–	5	–	0	2	–	8	–	0
$ – Conference champion; Rankings from AP Poll

The 1952 SMU Mustangs football team represented Southern Methodist University (SMU) as a member of the Southwest Conference (SWC) during the 1952 college football season. Led by Rusty Russell in his third and final season as head coach, the Mustangs compiled an overall record of 4–5–1 with a mark of 3–2–1 in conference play, placing third in the SWC. SMU played home games at the Cotton Bowl in Dallas. Bill Forester was the team captain.

== Schedule ==
Date	Opponent	Site	Result	Attendance	Source
August 26	No. 19 Duke*	Cotton Bowl; Dallas, TX	L 7–14	28,000	
October 4	No. 6 Georgia Tech*	Cotton Bowl; Dallas, TX	L 7–20	41,000	
October 11	at Missouri*	Memorial Stadium; Columbia, MO	W 25–7	25,000	
October 18	at Rice	Rice Stadium; Houston, TX (rivalry)	W 21–14	56,000	
October 25	No. 15 Kansas*	Cotton Bowl; Dallas, TX	L 0–26	30,000–33,000	
November 1	at No. 14 Texas	Memorial Stadium; Austin, TX	L 14–31	57,000	
November 8	Texas A&M	Cotton Bowl; Dallas, TX	W 21–13	62,000	
November 15	at Arkansas	Razorback Stadium; Fayetteville, AR	W 27–17	20,000	
November 22	Baylor	Cotton Bowl; Dallas, TX	T 7–7	30,000	
November 29	TCU	Cotton Bowl; Dallas, TX (rivalry)	L 7–14	32,000	
*Non-conference game; Rankings from AP Poll released prior to the game
