= Jennings B. Whitworth =

American college football coach, college baseball coach

Biographical details
- Born: September 17, 1908; Arkansas, U.S.
- Died: March 3, 1960 (aged 51); Athens, Georgia, U.S.

Playing career

Football
- 1930–1931: Alabama
- Position: Tackle

Coaching career (HC unless noted)

Football
- 1932–1934: Alabama (assistant)
- 1937: LSU (freshmen)
- 1938: LSU (line)
- 1939–1949: Georgia (assistant)
- 1950–1954: Oklahoma A&M
- 1955–1957: Alabama
- 1959: Georgia (assistant)

Baseball
- 1933–1934: Alabama
- 1943: Georgia

Head coaching record
- Overall: 26–51–14 (football); 22–21 (baseball)

Accomplishments and honors

Championships
- 1 MVC (1953)

Jennings Bryan "Ears" Whitworth (September 17, 1908 – March 3, 1960) was an American college football player and coach of football and baseball. He served as the head football coach at Oklahoma Agricultural and Mechanical College—now known as Oklahoma State University–Stillwater—from 1950 to 1954 and the University of Alabama from 1955 to 1957, compiling a career college football head coaching record of 26–51–4. Whitworth also coached baseball at Alabama from 1933 to 1934 and the University of Georgia in 1943, tallying a career college baseball coaching mark of 22–21.

== Coaching career ==
From 1950 to 1954, he coached at Oklahoma A&M, and compiled a 22–27–1 record. From 1955 to 1957, he coached at Alabama, where he posted a 4–24–2 record, the worst record for a non-interim coach in school history. This included a winless 1955 season, Alabama's last winless season on the field to date, and a 14-game losing streak from 1955 to 1956. In his first year at Alabama, Whitworth was only allowed to hire two of his own coaches and forced to retain the rest of former coach Harold Drew's assistants. This included athletic director Hank Crisp, Whitworth's boss, who was in charge of the defense. Whitworth brought assistant coach Moose Johnson with him from Oklahoma A&M. Following successive 2–7–1 seasons in 1956 and 1957, Whitworth was fired and replaced by Bear Bryant. In 1951, while Whitworth was coaching Oklahoma A&M, the infamous Johnny Bright Incident, occurred in the football game in Stillwater, Oklahoma, against the visiting Drake Bulldogs. Whitworth subsequently acknowledged to the press that the hit on Bright was illegal, but did not suspend the player responsible. One player later alleged that Whitworth had instigated the incident through labelling Bright a "prima donna" and expressing racist sentiments during practice.

Whitworth was an Alabama graduate and had played tackle on the football team alongside Fred Sington. He was an assistant football coach at Alabama, Louisiana State University, and the University of Georgia prior to becoming a head coach. In 1959, Whitworth returned as a line coach for Wally Butts' SEC champion Georgia team.

Whitworth was the head baseball coach at Georgia in 1943, compiling a 1–10 won-loss record.

== Family ==
Jennings Bryan Whitworth was born September 17, 1908, in Arkansas to parents James Ervin Whitworth (1870 – ?) and Lila Lee ? (1882 – ?). He married Virginia Ann Calvert (May 7, 1911, in West Monroe, Louisiana – May 11, 2003, in Bartlesville, Oklahoma) on July 21, 1936, in West Monroe, La. She was the daughter of Emmitt Griffin Calvert (1868 – 1951) and Johnnie Fletcher Tooke (1880 – 1926). Jennings died on March 3, 1960, in Athens, Georgia.

== Head coaching record ==
=== Football ===
Year	Team	Overall	Conference	Standing
Oklahoma A&M Cowboys (Missouri Valley Conference) (1950–1954)
1950	Oklahoma A&M	4–6–1	1–2–1	T–4th
1951	Oklahoma A&M	3–7	3–2	3rd
1952	Oklahoma A&M	3–7	2–2	3rd
1953	Oklahoma A&M	7–3	3–1	T–1st
1954	Oklahoma A&M	5–4–1	2–2	3rd
Oklahoma A&M:		22–27–2	11–9–1	
Alabama Crimson Tide (Southeastern Conference) (1955–1957)
1955	Alabama	0–10	0–7	12th
1956	Alabama	2–7–1	2–5	T–8th
1957	Alabama	2–7–1	1–6–1	10th
Alabama:		4–24–2	3–18–1	
Total:		26–51–4		
National championship Conference title Conference division title or championship game berth
