= 1952 Texas Longhorns football team =

American college football season

1952 Texas Longhorns football

SWC champion Cotton Bowl Classic champion

Cotton Bowl Classic, W 16–0 vs. Tennessee
- Conference: Southwest Conference

Ranking
- Coaches: No. 11
- AP: No. 10
- Record: 9–2 (6–0 SWC)
- Head coach: Ed Price (2nd season)
- Home stadium: Memorial Stadium

1952 Southwest Conference football standings
	Conf.					Overall
Team	W		L		T	W		L		T
No. 10 Texas $	6	–	0	–	0	9	–	2	–	0
Rice	4	–	2	–	0	5	–	5	–	0
SMU	3	–	2	–	1	4	–	5	–	1
TCU	2	–	2	–	2	4	–	4	–	2
Baylor	1	–	3	–	2	4	–	4	–	2
Texas A&M	1	–	4	–	1	3	–	6	–	1
Arkansas	1	–	5	–	0	2	–	8	–	0
$ – Conference champion; Rankings from AP Poll

The 1952 Texas Longhorns football team was an American football team that represented the University of Texas (now known as the University of Texas at Austin) as a member of the Southwest Conference (SWC) during the 1952 college football season. In their second year under head coach Ed Price, the Longhorns compiled an overall record of 9–2, with a mark of 6–0 in conference play, and finished as SWC champion. Texas concluded their season with a victory over Tennessee in the Cotton Bowl Classic.

== Schedule ==
Date	Opponent	Rank	Site	Result	Attendance	Source
September 20	at LSU*	No. 11	Tiger Stadium; Baton Rouge, LA	W 35–14	44,000	
September 27	at North Carolina*	No. 11	Kenan Memorial Stadium; Chapel Hill, NC	W 28–7	40,000	
October 4	No. 19 Notre Dame*	No. 5	Memorial Stadium; Austin, TX	L 3–14	67,660	
October 11	vs. No. 12 Oklahoma*		Cotton Bowl; Dallas, TX (rivalry)	L 20–49	75,504	
October 18	Arkansas		Memorial Stadium; Austin, TX (rivalry)	W 44–7	44,000	
October 25	at Rice	No. 20	Rice Stadium; Houston, TX (rivalry)	W 20–7	66,000	
November 1	SMU	No. 14	Memorial Stadium; Austin, TX	W 31–14	57,000	
November 8	at Baylor	No. 13	Baylor Stadium; Waco, TX (rivalry)	W 35–33	32,000	
November 15	at TCU	No. 9	Amon G. Carter Stadium; Fort Worth, TX (rivalry)	W 14–7	32,000	
November 27	Texas A&M	No. 10	Memorial Stadium; Austin, TX (rivalry)	W 32–12	64,000	
January 1	vs. No. 8 Tennessee*	No. 10	Cotton Bowl; Dallas, TX (Cotton Bowl Classic)	W 16–0	75,500	
*Non-conference game; Rankings from AP Poll released prior to the game

== Awards and honors ==
- Bud McFadin, Guard, Cotton Bowl Classic Co-Most Valuable Player
- Bud McFadin, Consensus All-American
