= Floyd Harrawood =

American gridiron football player (1929–2003)

Profile
- Positions: Tackle, End

Personal information
- Born: September 8, 1929; Kansas City, Kansas, U.S.
- Died: May 2, 2003 (aged 73); Broken Arrow, Oklahoma, U.S.
- Listed height: 6 ft 2 in (1.88 m)
- Listed weight: 242 lb (110 kg)

Career information
- College: Tulsa

Career history
- 1953–1954: Calgary Stampeders
- 1955–1956: Winnipeg Blue Bombers
- 1956–1957: Calgary Stampeders

Floyd R. Harrawood Jr. (September 8, 1929 – May 2, 2003) was an American professional football player who played for the Winnipeg Blue Bombers and Calgary Stampeders. He played college football at the University of Tulsa.
