= 1953 Cotton Bowl Classic =

- 17th Cotton Bowl Classic
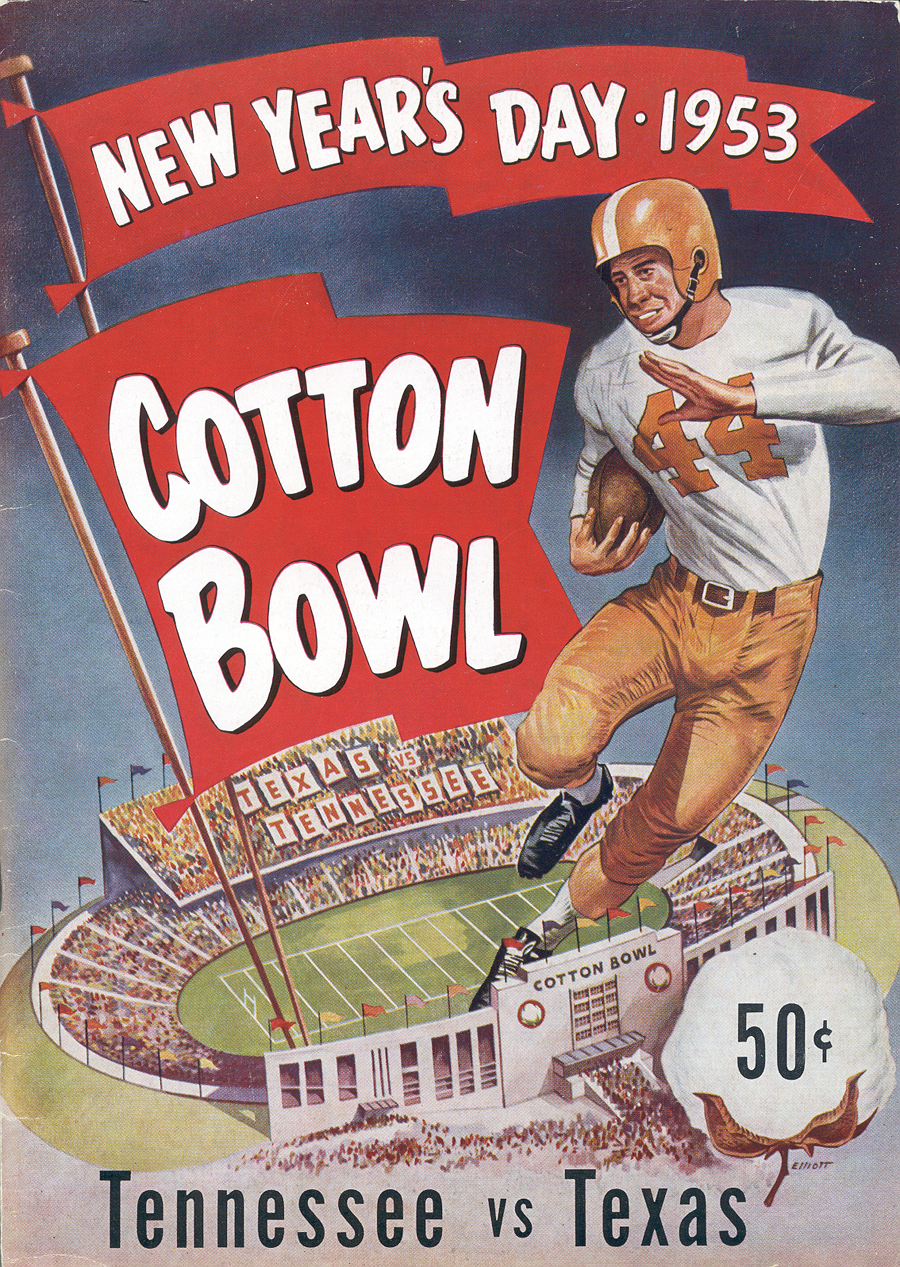
Tennessee Volunteers	Texas Longhorns
(8–1–1)	(8–2)
SEC	SWC
0	16
Head coach: Robert Neyland	Head coach: Ed Price
AP / Coaches; 8 / 8	AP / Coaches; 10 / 11
	1	2	3	4	Total
Tennessee	0	0	0	0	0
Texas	2	7	0	7	16
- Date: January 1, 1953
- Season: 1952
- Stadium: Cotton Bowl
- Location: Dallas, Texas
- MVP: HB Richard Ochoa (Texas); G Harley Sewell (Texas); LB Bob Griesbach (Tennessee)
- Referee: Alvin Bell (SEC; split crew: SEC, SWC)
- Attendance: 75,500

United States TV coverage
- Network: NBC

The Cotton Bowl in Dallas, Texas, hosted the Cotton Bowl Classic.

The 1953 Cotton Bowl Classic featured the Tennessee Volunteers and the Texas Longhorns. This was the first Cotton Bowl Classic to be broadcast on television.

== Background ==
The Longhorns were in their first Bowl appearance under Price, in his second season with the team. They had won the Southwest Conference for the first time since 1950. The Volunteers finished 2nd in the Southeastern Conference in Neyland's final season.

== Game summary ==
Midway through the first quarter, Dave Griffith was tackled by Carlton Massey for a safety after trying to do a fake punt...on first down. After a fumble by Ray Byrd was recovered by Clifford Polk early in the second quarter, Gib Dawson scored on a 4-yard touchdown run 7 plays later to give Texas a 9-0 lead at halftime. Midway through the fourth quarter, Jim Rosser recovered a Vols fumble and seven plays later, Billy Quinn scored on a touchdown run seal Tennessee's fate as the Longhorns got revenge on what happened two Cotton Bowls earlier. Despite both teams losing three fumbles, Tennessee cost them more dearly and led to 14 points for Texas.

== Aftermath ==
Price would win the SWC again, but a 1-9 season in 1956 led to Price's resignation, leading the way for Darrell Royal to be hired. Harvey Robinson took over for the Vols after Neyland's retirement, but it would take him being fired before the Vols returned to a bowl game under his replacement.

== Statistics ==
Statistics	Texas	Tennessee
First downs	20	6
Yards rushing	269	-14
Yards passing	32	46
Total yards	301	32
Punts-Average	5-35.4	7-40.9
Fumbles-Lost	5-3	5-3
Interceptions	1	0
Penalties-Yards	5-55	3-30
