= Ed Price (American football) =

American athlete and football coach (1909–1976)

Biographical details
- Born: January 12, 1909; Brownwood, Texas, U.S.
- Died: March 1, 1976 (aged 67); Austin, Texas, U.S.

Playing career

Football
- 1930–1932: Texas

Basketball
- 1931–1933: Texas

Baseball
- 1932–1933: Texas

Coaching career (HC unless noted)

Football
- 1936–1941: Texas (assistant)
- 1946–1950: Texas (assistant)
- 1951–1956: Texas

Head coaching record
- Overall: 33–27–1
- Bowls: 1–0

Accomplishments and honors

Championships
- 2 SWC (1952–1953)

Edwin Booth Price (January 12, 1909 – March 1, 1976) was an American football, basketball, and baseball player and coach of football. He served as the head football coach at the University of Texas at Austin from 1951 to 1956, compiling a record of 33–27–1. After Blair Cherry's abrupt resignation, Price was promoted to head coach. In his first three seasons, Price carried over the success of Dana X. Bible and Cherry, leading the Longhorns to three winning seasons and two Southwest Conference titles. In 1954, Texas went 4–5–1, its first losing season in 15 years. After capping off three consecutive losing seasons with a 1–9 season, the worst record in school history, Price tendered his resignation in 1956. He stayed on at Texas, first in the physical education department and later as assistant dean of students. Price died on March 1, 1976, at his home in Austin, Texas.

== Head coaching record ==
Year	Team	Overall	Conference	Standing	Bowl/playoffs	Coaches^{#}	AP^{°}
Texas Longhorns (Southwest Conference) (1951–1956)
1951	Texas	7–3	3–3	T–3rd			
1952	Texas	9–2	6–0	1st	W Cotton	11	10
1953	Texas	7–3	5–1	T–1st		8	11
1954	Texas	4–5–1	2–3–1	5th			
1955	Texas	5–5	4–2	3rd			
1956	Texas	1–9	0–6	7th			
Texas:		33–27–1	20–15–1				
Total:		33–27–1					
National championship Conference title Conference division title or championship game berth
^{#}Rankings from final Coaches Poll.; ^{°}Rankings from final AP Poll.
