= 1952 Dayton Flyers football team =

American college football season

1952 Dayton Flyers football
- Conference: Independent
- Record: 6–5
- Head coach: Joe Gavin (6th season)
- Home stadium: UD Stadium

1952 Midwestern college football independents records
	Conf.			Overall
Team	W	L	T	W		L		T
No. 1 Michigan State		–		9	–	0	–	0
Michigan Tech		–		6	–	1	–	0
No. 3 Notre Dame		–		7	–	2	–	1
Carthage		–		5	–	2	–	0
Youngstown		–		4	–	3	–	1
Wabash		–		5	–	4	–	0
Dayton		–		6	–	5	–	0
Baldwin–Wallace		–		4	–	4	–	0
Wayne		–		4	–	4	–	0
Bradley		–		4	–	5	–	0
John Carroll		–		4	–	5	–	0
Washington University		–		4	–	5	–	0
Rose Poly		–		3	–	4	–	1
Xavier		–		4	–	6	–	0
Marquette		–		3	–	5	–	1
Drake		–		2	–	7	–	0
Rankings from AP Poll

The 1952 Dayton Flyers football team represented the University of Dayton as an independent during the 1952 college football season. In their sixth season under head coach Joe Gavin, the Flyers compiled a 6–5 record. Dayton played their home games at UD Stadium in Dayton, Ohio.

== Schedule ==
Date	Time	Opponent	Site	Result	Attendance	Source
September 20		at Cincinnati	Nippert Stadium; Cincinnati, OH	L 0–25	25,000	
September 27	2:15 p.m.	Drake	UD Stadium; Dayton, OH	W 34–13	7,000	
October 4		North Texas State	UD Stadium; Dayton, OH	W 20–14	6,300	
October 11		at Louisville	Parkway Field; Louisville, KY	W 20–0	6,000	
October 18		Camp Lejeune	UD Stadium; Dayton, OH	L 19–23		
October 25		John Carroll	UD Stadium; Dayton, OH	W 21–0	7,100	
November 2		Xavier	UD Stadium; Dayton, OH	L 13–14	9,500	
November 8		Marshall	UD Stadium; Dayton, OH	W 31–14		
November 15		at Miami (OH)	Miami Field; Oxford, OH	L 13–27		
November 23		at Xavier	Xavier Stadium; Cincinnati, OH	W 13–0	10,500	
November 27		at Chattanooga	Chamberlain Field; Chattanooga, TN	L 7–40	8,500-9,000	
All times are in Eastern time; Source:
