= 1952 Memphis State Tigers football team =

American college football season

1952 Memphis State Tigers football
- Conference: Independent
- Record: 2–7
- Head coach: Ralph Hatley (6th season)
- Home stadium: Crump Stadium

1952 Southern college football independents records
	Conf.			Overall
Team	W	L	T	W		L		T
Maryland State		–		9	–	1	–	0
Mississippi Southern		–		10	–	2	–	0
Virginia		–		8	–	2	–	0
Sewanee		–		7	–	2	–	0
No. 17 Navy		–		6	–	2	–	1
Arkansas State		–		8	–	3	–	0
Tampa		–		8	–	3	–	1
Chattanooga		–		7	–	3	–	0
Northeast Louisiana State		–		5	–	4	–	0
Delaware		–		4	–	4	–	0
Louisville		–		3	–	5	–	0
Miami (FL)		–		4	–	7	–	0
Marshall		–		2	–	7	–	2
Memphis State		–		2	–	7	–	0
Florida State		–		1	–	8	–	1
Rankings from AP Poll

The 1952 Memphis State Tigers football team was an American football team that represented Memphis State College (now known as the University of Memphis) as an independent during the 1952 college football season. In their sixth season under head coach Ralph Hatley, Memphis State compiled a 2–7 record.

== Schedule ==
Date	Opponent	Site	Result	Attendance	Source
September 19	Ole Miss	Crump Stadium; Memphis, TN (rivalry)	L 6–54	16,413	
September 27	at Mississippi Southern	Faulkner Field; Hattiesburg, MS (Black and Blue Bowl)	L 20–27	10,000	
October 4	at Louisiana Tech	Tech Stadium; Ruston, LA	L 7–26		
October 11	Murray State	Crump Stadium; Memphis, TN	W 34–7		
October 17	at Chattanooga	Chamberlain Field; Chattanooga, TN	L 6–23	8,500	
October 25	North Texas State	Crump Stadium; Memphis, TN	L 14–38	3,600	
November 8	Louisville^{†}	Crump Stadium; Memphis, TN (rivalry)	W 29–25	5,000	
November 15	at Tennessee Tech	Overall Field; Cookeville, TN	L 0–35		
November 22	Southeastern Louisiana	Crump Stadium; Memphis, TN	L 25–28		
^{†}Homecoming
