= 1952 Drake Bulldogs football team =

American college football season

1952 Drake Bulldogs football
- Conference: Independent
- Record: 2–7
- Head coach: Warren Gaer (4th season)
- Home stadium: Drake Stadium

1952 Midwestern college football independents records
	Conf.			Overall
Team	W	L	T	W		L		T
No. 1 Michigan State		–		9	–	0	–	0
Michigan Tech		–		6	–	1	–	0
No. 3 Notre Dame		–		7	–	2	–	1
Carthage		–		5	–	2	–	0
Youngstown		–		4	–	3	–	1
Wabash		–		5	–	4	–	0
Dayton		–		6	–	5	–	0
Baldwin–Wallace		–		4	–	4	–	0
Wayne		–		4	–	4	–	0
Bradley		–		4	–	5	–	0
John Carroll		–		4	–	5	–	0
Washington University		–		4	–	5	–	0
Rose Poly		–		3	–	4	–	1
Xavier		–		4	–	6	–	0
Marquette		–		3	–	5	–	1
Drake		–		2	–	7	–	0
Rankings from AP Poll

The 1952 Drake Bulldogs football team was an American football team that represented Drake University as an independent during the 1952 college football season. Led by fourth-year head coach Warren Gaer, the Bulldogs compiled a record of 2–7.

== Schedule ==
Date	Time	Opponent	Site	Result	Attendance	Source
September 20	8:00 p.m.	at Iowa State Teachers	O. R. Latham Stadium; Cedar Falls, IA	W 14–12		
September 27	1:15 p.m.	at Dayton	University of Dayton Stadium; Dayton, OH	L 13–34	7,000	
October 4	1:30 p.m.	Emporia State	Drake Stadium; Des Moines, IA	W 34–18	3,500	
October 10	7:30 p.m.	at Boston College	Braves Field; Boston, MA	L 14–20	13,628	
October 18		at Detroit	University of Detroit Stadium; Detroit, MI	L 0–57	8,000	
October 24	8:00 p.m.	Bradley	Drake Stadium; Des Moines, IA	L 0–33	4,500	
November 1	1:30 p.m.	Denver^{†}	Drake Stadium; Des Moines, IA	L 19–27	6,000	
November 8	2:00 p.m.	at Iowa State	Clyde Williams Field; Ames, IA	L 7–55	8,313–10,000	
November 15	1:30 p.m.	Wichita	Drake Stadium; Des Moines, IA	L 14–41	2,500	
^{†}Homecoming; All times are in Central time
