= 1952 Delaware Fightin' Blue Hens football team =

American college football season

1952 Delaware Fightin' Blue Hens football
- Conference: Independent
- Record: 4–4
- Head coach: David M. Nelson (2nd season)
- Captain: Paul Mueller
- Home stadium: Wilmington Park, Delaware Stadium

1952 Southern college football independents records
	Conf.			Overall
Team	W	L	T	W		L		T
Maryland State		–		9	–	1	–	0
Mississippi Southern		–		10	–	2	–	0
Virginia		–		8	–	2	–	0
Sewanee		–		7	–	2	–	0
No. 17 Navy		–		6	–	2	–	1
Arkansas State		–		8	–	3	–	0
Tampa		–		8	–	3	–	1
Chattanooga		–		7	–	3	–	0
Northeast Louisiana State		–		5	–	4	–	0
Delaware		–		4	–	4	–	0
Louisville		–		3	–	5	–	0
Miami (FL)		–		4	–	7	–	0
Marshall		–		2	–	7	–	2
Memphis State		–		2	–	7	–	0
Florida State		–		1	–	8	–	1
Rankings from AP Poll

The 1952 Delaware Fightin' Blue Hens football team was an American football team that represented the University of Delaware as an independent during the 1952 college football season. In its second season under head coach David M. Nelson, the team compiled a 4–4 record and outscored opponents by a total of 134 to 122. Paul Mueller was the team captain. The team played its home games at Wilmington Park in Wilmington, Delaware, and for the final two games at Delaware Stadium in Newark, Delaware .

== Schedule ==
Date	Opponent	Site	Result	Attendance	Source
September 27	Gettysburg	Wilmington Park; Wilmington, DE	L 13–14	6,500	
October 4	at Lehigh	Taylor Stadium; Bethlehem, PA (rivalry)	W 7–6	7,000	
October 11	West Chester	Wilmington Park; Wilmington, DE (rivalry)	L 20–24	6,000	
October 25	Connecticut	Wilmington Park; Wilmington, DE	L 13–25	4,419	
November 1	at Muhlenberg	Allentown High School Stadium; Allentown, PA	L 12–21	3,000	
November 8	Pennsylvania Military	Wilmington Park^{[a]}; Wilmington, DE	W 43–20	2,451	
November 15	Lafayette	Delaware Stadium^{[b]}; Newark, DE	W 13–12	1,800	
November 22	Bucknell	Delaware Stadium; Newark, DE	W 13–0	2,500	
^{a} Last Delaware game played at Wilmington Park. ^{b} First game played at Delaware Stadium.
