= 1952 Wiley Wildcats football team =

American college football season

1952 Wiley Wildcats football
- Conference: Southwestern Athletic Conference
- Record: 4–5 (2–4 SWAC)
- Head coach: J. Forrest Kelley (1st season)
- Home stadium: Wiley Field

1952 Southwestern Athletic Conference football standings
	Conf.					Overall
Team	W		L		T	W		L		T
No. 5 Prairie View A&M $	6	–	0	–	0	7	–	2	–	0
No. 10 Southern	5	–	1	–	0	9	–	2	–	0
No. 13 Texas College	3	–	2	–	1	4	–	3	–	1
Arkansas AM&N	2	–	2	–	2	3	–	6	–	2
Wiley	2	–	4	–	0	4	–	5	–	0
Langston	1	–	4	–	1	2	–	6	–	1
Bishop	0	–	6	–	0	2	–	8	–	0
$ – Conference champion; Rankings from Associated Negro Press

The 1952 Wiley Wildcats football team represented Wiley College as a member of the Southwestern Athletic Conference (SWAC) during the 1952 college football season. Led by first-year head coach J. Forrest Kelley, the Wildcats compiled an overall record of 4–5, with a conference record of 2–4, and finished fifth in the SWAC.

== Schedule ==
Date	Opponent	Site	Result	Attendance	Source
September 27	at Xavier (LA)*	Xavier Stadium; New Orleans, LA	W 21–7	4,000	
October 4	Arkansas AM&N	Wiley Stadium; Marshall, TX	L 7–12	3,000	
October 13	vs. Prairie View A&M	Cotton Bowl; Dallas, TX (State Fair Classic)	L 0–53	15,000	
October 20	vs. Grambling*	State Fair Stadium; Shreveport, LA	L 14–18		
November 1	Bishop	Wiley Field; Marshall, TX	W 31–0		
November 8	Langston^{†}	Wiley Field; Marshall, TX	W 18–6	3,700	
November 15	at Southern	University Stadium; Baton Rouge, LA	L 20–38		
November 22	Paul Quinn*	Wiley Field; Marshall, TX	W 50–6		
November 27	vs. Texas College	Amon G. Carter Stadium; Fort Worth, TX	L 14–25	3,500	
*Non-conference game; ^{†}Homecoming
