= 1952 Navy Midshipmen football team =

American college football season

1952 Navy Midshipmen football
- Conference: Independent

Ranking
- Coaches: No. 17
- Record: 6–2–1
- Head coach: Eddie Erdelatz (3rd season)
- Captain: John Gurski
- Home stadium: Thompson Stadium

1952 Southern college football independents records
| | Conf. | | | Overall |
| Team | W | L | T | W | | L | | T |
|---|---|---|---|---|---|---|---|---|
| Maryland State | | – | | 9 | – | 1 | – | 0 |
| Mississippi Southern | | – | | 10 | – | 2 | – | 0 |
| Virginia | | – | | 8 | – | 2 | – | 0 |
| Sewanee | | – | | 7 | – | 2 | – | 0 |
| No. 17 Navy | | – | | 6 | – | 2 | – | 1 |
| Arkansas State | | – | | 8 | – | 3 | – | 0 |
| Tampa | | – | | 8 | – | 3 | – | 1 |
| Chattanooga | | – | | 7 | – | 3 | – | 0 |
| Northeast Louisiana State | | – | | 5 | – | 4 | – | 0 |
| Delaware | | – | | 4 | – | 4 | – | 0 |
| Louisville | | – | | 3 | – | 5 | – | 0 |
| Miami (FL) | | – | | 4 | – | 7 | – | 0 |
| Marshall | | – | | 2 | – | 7 | – | 2 |
| Memphis State | | – | | 2 | – | 7 | – | 0 |
| Florida State | | – | | 1 | – | 8 | – | 1 |
Rankings from AP Poll

The 1952 Navy Midshipmen football team represented the United States Naval Academy (USNA) as an independent during the 1952 college football season. The team was led by third-year head coach Eddie Erdelatz. They were invited to the 1953 Orange Bowl but refused the bid.

== Schedule ==
| Date | Time | Opponent | Rank | Site | TV | Result | Attendance | Source |
|---|---|---|---|---|---|---|---|---|
| September 27 | | Yale | | Municipal Stadium; Baltimore, MD | | W 31–7 | 25,000 | |
| October 4 | | at Cornell | | Schoellkopf Field; Ithaca, NY | | W 31–7 | 25,000 | |
| October 11 | | William & Mary^{†} | No. 17 | Thompson Stadium; Annapolis, MD | | W 14–0 | 19,000 | |
| October 18 | | at No. 2 Maryland | No. 20 | Byrd Stadium; College Park, MD (rivalry) | | L 7–38 | 44,716 | |
| October 25 | | at Penn | | Franklin Field; Philadelphia, PA | | T 7–7 | 66,000 | |
| November 1 | | vs. No. 13 Notre Dame | | Municipal Stadium; Cleveland, OH (rivalry) | | L 6–17 | 61,927 | |
| November 8 | | at No. 12 Duke | | Duke Stadium; Durham, NC | | W 16–6 | 25,000–30,000 | |
| November 15 | | Columbia | | Thompson Stadium; Annapolis, MD | | W 28–0 | 14,000 | |
| November 29 | 1:00 p.m. | vs. Army | | Philadelphia Municipal Stadium; Philadelphia, PA (Army–Navy Game) | NBC | W 7–0 | | |
^{†}Homecoming; Rankings from AP Poll released prior to the game; All times are in Eastern time

== Roster ==
1952 Navy Midshipmen football team roster
| Players | | | Coaches |
|---|---|---|---|
| Offense: Pos. / # / Name / Class | Defense: Pos. / # / Name / Class; LB / / Joe Gattuso / So | Special teams: Pos. / # / Name / Class | Head coach: Eddie Erdelatz; Coordinators/assistant coaches Legend: (C) Team captain; (S) Suspended; (I) Ineligible; Injured; Redshirt |
