= 1952 Northeast Louisiana State Indians football team =

American college football season

1952 Northeast Louisiana State Indians football
- Conference: Independent
- Record: 5–4
- Head coach: James L. Malone (19th season)
- Home stadium: Brown Stadium

1952 Southern college football independents records
	Conf.			Overall
Team	W	L	T	W		L		T
Maryland State		–		9	–	1	–	0
Mississippi Southern		–		10	–	2	–	0
Virginia		–		8	–	2	–	0
Sewanee		–		7	–	2	–	0
No. 17 Navy		–		6	–	2	–	1
Arkansas State		–		8	–	3	–	0
Tampa		–		8	–	3	–	1
Chattanooga		–		7	–	3	–	0
Northeast Louisiana State		–		5	–	4	–	0
Delaware		–		4	–	4	–	0
Louisville		–		3	–	5	–	0
Miami (FL)		–		4	–	7	–	0
Marshall		–		2	–	7	–	2
Memphis State		–		2	–	7	–	0
Florida State		–		1	–	8	–	1
Rankings from AP Poll

The 1952 Northeast Louisiana State Indians football team was an American football team that represented Northeast Louisiana State College (now known as the University of Louisiana at Monroe) as an independent during the 1952 college football season. In their 19th year under head coach James L. Malone, the team compiled a 5–4 record.

== Schedule ==
Date	Opponent	Site	Result	Attendance	Source
September 20	at Southeastern Louisiana	Strawberry Stadium; Hammond, LA	L 20–21		
September 27	Stetson	Brown Stadium; Monroe, LA	L 20–40		
October 4	Livingston State	Brown Stadium; Monroe, LA	W 41–7		
October 11	at McNeese State	Killen Field; Lake Charles, LA	L 7–41		
October 18	at Western Kentucky	Bowling Green, KY	L 27–42	3,500	
October 25	at Arkansas A&M	Monticello, AR	W 36–20		
November 8	Northwestern State	Brown Stadium; Monroe, LA (rivalry)	W 20–14		
November 15	at Louisiana College	Alumni Field; Pineville, LA	W 39–18		
November 22	at Delta State	Delta Field; Cleveland, MS	W 33–6		
