= 1952 Xavier Musketeers football team =

American college football season

1952 Xavier Musketeers football
- Conference: Independent
- Record: 4–6
- Head coach: Ed Kluska (6th season)
- Home stadium: Xavier Stadium

1952 Midwestern college football independents records
	Conf.			Overall
Team	W	L	T	W		L		T
No. 1 Michigan State		–		9	–	0	–	0
Michigan Tech		–		6	–	1	–	0
No. 3 Notre Dame		–		7	–	2	–	1
Carthage		–		5	–	2	–	0
Youngstown		–		4	–	3	–	1
Wabash		–		5	–	4	–	0
Dayton		–		6	–	5	–	0
Baldwin–Wallace		–		4	–	4	–	0
Wayne		–		4	–	4	–	0
Bradley		–		4	–	5	–	0
John Carroll		–		4	–	5	–	0
Washington University		–		4	–	5	–	0
Rose Poly		–		3	–	4	–	1
Xavier		–		4	–	6	–	0
Marquette		–		3	–	5	–	1
Drake		–		2	–	7	–	0
Rankings from AP Poll

The 1952 Xavier Musketeers football team was an American football team that represented Xavier University as an independent during the 1952 college football season. In their sixth year under head coach Ed Kluska, the Musketeers compiled a 4–6 record.

== Schedule ==
Date	Opponent	Site	Result	Attendance	Source
September 21	Quantico Marines	Xavier Stadium; Cincinnati, OH	L 7–14	12,500	
September 28	Camp Lejeune	Xavier Stadium; Cincinnati, OH	L 21–34	9,500	
October 4	at Miami (OH)	Miami Field; Oxford, OH	L 7–26	11,050	
October 11	at Cincinnati	Nippert Stadium; Cincinnati, OH (rivalry)	L 13–20	27,000	
October 18	Louisville	Xavier Stadium; Cincinnati, OH	W 27–13	10,500	
October 25	No. 12 Villanova	Xavier Stadium; Cincinnati, OH	L 20–34		
November 2	at Dayton	UD Stadium; Dayton, OH	W 14–13	9,500	
November 8	at John Carroll	Shaw Stadium; East Cleveland, OH	W 13–7	5,000	
November 15	at Boston College	Braves Field; Boston, MA	W 6–0	6,640	
November 23	Dayton	Xavier Stadium; Cincinnati, OH	L 0–13	10,500	
Rankings from AP Poll released prior to the game
