= 1952 Arkansas State Indians football team =

American college football season

1952 Arkansas State Indians football

Refrigerator Bowl, L 19–34 vs. Western Kentucky
- Conference: Independent
- Record: 8–3
- Head coach: Forrest England (7th season)
- Home stadium: Kays Stadium

1952 Southern college football independents records
	Conf.			Overall
Team	W	L	T	W		L		T
Maryland State		–		9	–	1	–	0
Mississippi Southern		–		10	–	2	–	0
Virginia		–		8	–	2	–	0
Sewanee		–		7	–	2	–	0
No. 17 Navy		–		6	–	2	–	1
Arkansas State		–		8	–	3	–	0
Tampa		–		8	–	3	–	1
Chattanooga		–		7	–	3	–	0
Northeast Louisiana State		–		5	–	4	–	0
Delaware		–		4	–	4	–	0
Louisville		–		3	–	5	–	0
Miami (FL)		–		4	–	7	–	0
Marshall		–		2	–	7	–	2
Memphis State		–		2	–	7	–	0
Florida State		–		1	–	8	–	1
Rankings from AP Poll

The 1952 Arkansas State Indians football team was an American football team that represented Arkansas State College—now known as Arkansas State University—as an independent during the 1952 college football season. Led by seventh-year head coach Forrest England, the Indians compiled a record of 8–3. They were invited to the Refrigerator Bowl, where they lost to Western Kentucky.

== Schedule ==
Date	Time	Opponent	Site	Result	Attendance	Source
September 13		at Memphis Navy	Millington, TN	W 39–0		
September 20		Ohio Northern	Kays Stadium; Jonesboro, AR	W 47–0		
September 27		Ellington Air Force Base	Kays Stadium; Jonesboro, AR	W 48–0		
October 4		at Mississippi State	Scott Field; Starkville, MS	L 14–41		
October 11		at Florence State	Memorial Stadium; Florence, AL	W 28–7		
October 18		Tennessee Tech	Kays Stadium; Jonesboro, AR	L 13–21		
October 25		Lewis^{†}	Kays Stadium; Jonesboro, AR	W 42–0		
November 1		at Southern State (AR)	Magnolia, AR	W 34–0		
November 8	2:00 p.m.	at Pittsburg State	Brandenburg Field; Pittsburg, KS	W 26–7		
November 15		Emporia State	Kays Stadium; Jonesboro, AR	W 41–7		
December 7		vs. Western Kentucky	Reitz Bowl; Evansville, IN (Refrigerator Bowl)	L 19–34	9,000	
^{†}Homecoming; All times are in Central time
