= 1952 Mississippi Southern Southerners football team =

American college football season

1952 Mississippi Southern Southerners football

Sun Bowl, L 7–26 vs. Pacific (CA)
- Conference: Independent
- Record: 10–2
- Head coach: Thad Vann (3rd season)
- Home stadium: Faulkner Field

1952 Southern college football independents records
	Conf.			Overall
Team	W	L	T	W		L		T
Maryland State		–		9	–	1	–	0
Mississippi Southern		–		10	–	2	–	0
Virginia		–		8	–	2	–	0
Sewanee		–		7	–	2	–	0
No. 17 Navy		–		6	–	2	–	1
Arkansas State		–		8	–	3	–	0
Tampa		–		8	–	3	–	1
Chattanooga		–		7	–	3	–	0
Northeast Louisiana State		–		5	–	4	–	0
Delaware		–		4	–	4	–	0
Louisville		–		3	–	5	–	0
Miami (FL)		–		4	–	7	–	0
Marshall		–		2	–	7	–	2
Memphis State		–		2	–	7	–	0
Florida State		–		1	–	8	–	1
Rankings from AP Poll

The 1952 Mississippi Southern Southerners football team represented Mississippi Southern College (now known as the University of Southern Mississippi) in the 1952 college football season. The team played in the Sun Bowl against the Pacific Tigers. The Southerners compiled a 10–2 record, and outscored their opponents by a total of 409 to 189.

== Schedule ==
Date	Opponent	Site	Result	Attendance	Source
September 19	at Alabama	Cramton Bowl; Montgomery, AL	L 6–20	12,000	
September 27	Memphis State	Faulkner Field; Hattiesburg, MS	W 27–20	10,000	
October 4	at Tampa	Phillips Field; Tampa, FL	W 52–25		
October 11	Southwestern Louisiana	Faulkner Field; Hattiesburg, MS	W 32–12	7,500	
October 18	at Southeastern Louisiana	Strawberry Stadium; Hammond, LA	W 20–12		
October 25	Chattanooga^{†}	Faulkner Field; Hattiesburg, MS	W 27–14	12,000	
November 1	at Northwestern State	Demon Stadium; Natchitoches, LA	W 39–13		
November 8	at Florida State	Doak Campbell Stadium; Tallahassee, FL	W 50–21	5,020	
November 15	Louisiana Tech	Faulkner Field; Hattiesburg, MS (Rivalry in Dixie)	W 52–0	10,000+	
November 22	Louisville	Mississippi Veterans Memorial Stadium; Jackson, MS	W 55–26	15,000	
November 28	Stetson	Faulkner Field; Hattiesburg, MS	W 42–0		
January 1, 1953	vs. Pacific (CA)	Kidd Field; El Paso, TX (Sun Bowl)	L 7–26	11,000	
^{†}Homecoming
