= 1952 Notre Dame Fighting Irish football team =

American college football season

1952 Notre Dame Fighting Irish football
- Conference: Independent

Ranking
- Coaches: No. 3
- AP: No. 3
- Record: 7–2–1
- Head coach: Frank Leahy (10th season)
- Captain: Jack Alessandrini
- Home stadium: Notre Dame Stadium

1952 Midwestern college football independents records
	Conf.			Overall
Team	W	L	T	W		L		T
No. 1 Michigan State		–		9	–	0	–	0
Michigan Tech		–		6	–	1	–	0
No. 3 Notre Dame		–		7	–	2	–	1
Carthage		–		5	–	2	–	0
Youngstown		–		4	–	3	–	1
Wabash		–		5	–	4	–	0
Dayton		–		6	–	5	–	0
Baldwin–Wallace		–		4	–	4	–	0
Wayne		–		4	–	4	–	0
Bradley		–		4	–	5	–	0
John Carroll		–		4	–	5	–	0
Washington University		–		4	–	5	–	0
Rose Poly		–		3	–	4	–	1
Xavier		–		4	–	6	–	0
Marquette		–		3	–	5	–	1
Drake		–		2	–	7	–	0
Rankings from AP Poll

The 1952 Notre Dame Fighting Irish football team was an American football team that represented the University of Notre Dame as an independent during the 1952 college football season. In their tenth year under head coach Frank Leahy, the Fighting Irish compiled a 7–2–1 record, outscored opponents by a total of 183 to 108, and were ranked No. 3 in the final AP and UP polls. They played six games against ranked opponents, defeating No. 5 Texas, No. 9 Purdue, No. 4 Oklahoma, and No. 2 USC, tying with No. 12 Penn, and losing to No. 1 Michigan State.

Halfback Johnny Lattner was a unanimous first-team pick on the 1952 All-America college football team. Tackle Sam Palumbo received third-team honors from the Central Press.

The team played its home games at Notre Dame Stadium in Notre Dame, Indiana.

== Schedule ==
Date	Opponent	Rank	Site	Result	Attendance	Source
September 27	at No. 12 Penn	No. 10	Franklin Field; Philadelphia, PA	T 7–7	74,518	
October 4	at No. 5 Texas	No. 19	Texas Memorial Stadium; Austin, TX	W 14–3	67,660	
October 11	Pittsburgh	No. 8	Notre Dame Stadium; Notre Dame, IN (rivalry)	L 19–22	45,503	
October 18	at No. 9 Purdue		Ross-Ade Stadium; West Lafayette, IN (rivalry)	W 26–14	49,000	
October 25	North Carolina	No. 16	Notre Dame Stadium; Notre Dame, IN (rivalry)	W 34–14	54,338	
November 1	vs. Navy	No. 13	Municipal Stadium; Cleveland, OH (rivalry)	W 17–6	61,927	
November 8	No. 4 Oklahoma	No. 10	Notre Dame Stadium; Notre Dame, IN	W 27–21	57,446	
November 15	at No. 1 Michigan State	No. 6	Macklin Stadium; East Lansing, MI (rivalry)	L 3–21	52,472	
November 22	at Iowa	No. 9	Iowa Stadium; Iowa City, IA	W 27–0	46,600	
November 29	No. 2 USC	No. 7	Notre Dame Stadium; Notre Dame, IN (rivalry)	W 9–0	58,394	
Rankings from AP Poll released prior to the game

== Personnel ==
=== Players ===
- Jack Alessandrini, captain and guard/linebacker, senior, Charleston, WV
- Bob Arrix, reserve fullback, kicker
- Virgil Bardash, guard/tackle
- Ed Buczkiewicz, reserve quarterback
- Joe Bush, tackle
- Walt Cabral, offensive and defensive end
- Tom Carey, quarterback
- Gene Carrabine, safety
- Dave Flood, linebacker
- Dick Frasor, center and linebacker
- Armando "Army" Galardo, defensive halfback
- Ralph Guglielmi, quarterback
- Joe Heap, left halfback and punt returner
- Art Hunter, end
- Bob Joseph, halfback
- Johnny Lattner, halfback (defensive and offensive)
- Jack Lee, middle guard
- Fred Mangialardi, defensive end
- Bob Martin, reserve quarterback
- Menil "Minnie" Mavraides, offensive guards, defensive tackle, placekicker
- Tom McHugh, fullback
- Rockne Morrissey, defensive halfback
- Tom Murphy, tackle
- Art Nowack, center/linebacker
- Bob O'Neil, defensive end
- Sam Palumbo, left defensive tackle
- Tony Pasquesi, defensive right tackle
- Fran Paterra, halfback
- Don Penza, defensive end
- Fred Poehler, offensive tackle
- Bob Ready, defensive tackle
- Paul Reynolds, safety
- Paul Robst, guard
- Jim Schrader, center
- Tom Seaman, offensive guard
- Dan Shannon, linebacker
- Dick Szymanski, linebacker
- Bob Taylor, defensive tackle/guard
- Frank Varrichione, offensive tackle
- Jim Weithman, middle guard
- Jack Whelan, defensive halfback

=== Coaching staff ===
- Head coach: Frank Leahy
- Athletic director: Ed "Moose" Krause
- Assistant coaches: Bob McBride (tackles), John Druze (ends), Wally Ziembra (centers), Joe McArdle (guards), Bill Early (backfield), Johnny Lujack (backfield), Red Miller (volunteer coach)
- Head trainer: Eugene Paszkiet
- Student managers: Robert Millenbach, Emory Dakoske, and John Stoeller
- Equipment superintendent: Jack McAllister
