= 1952 Louisville Cardinals football team =

American college football season

1952 Louisville Cardinals football
- Conference: Independent
- Record: 3–5
- Head coach: Frank Camp (7th season)
- Home stadium: Parkway Field

1952 Southern college football independents records
	Conf.			Overall
Team	W	L	T	W		L		T
Maryland State		–		9	–	1	–	0
Mississippi Southern		–		10	–	2	–	0
Virginia		–		8	–	2	–	0
Sewanee		–		7	–	2	–	0
No. 17 Navy		–		6	–	2	–	1
Arkansas State		–		8	–	3	–	0
Tampa		–		8	–	3	–	1
Chattanooga		–		7	–	3	–	0
Northeast Louisiana State		–		5	–	4	–	0
Delaware		–		4	–	4	–	0
Louisville		–		3	–	5	–	0
Miami (FL)		–		4	–	7	–	0
Marshall		–		2	–	7	–	2
Memphis State		–		2	–	7	–	0
Florida State		–		1	–	8	–	1
Rankings from AP Poll

The 1952 Louisville Cardinals football team was an American football team that represented the University of Louisville as an independent during the 1952 college football season. In their seventh season under head coach Frank Camp, the Cardinals compiled a 3–5 record. Johnny Unitas was a player on the team.

== Schedule ==
Date	Opponent	Site	Result	Attendance	Source
September 27	at Wayne	Parkway Field; Louisville, KY	W 19–12		
October 4	at Florida State	Doak Campbell Stadium; Tallahassee, FL	W 41–14		
October 11	Dayton	Parkway Field; Louisville, KY	L 0–20	6,000	
October 18	at Xavier	Xavier Stadium; Cincinnati, OH	L 13–27	10,500	
October 31	at Chattanooga	Chamberlain Field; Chattanooga, TN	L 14–47		
November 8	at Memphis State	Crump Stadium; Memphis, TN (rivalry)	L 25–29	5,000	
November 15	Eastern Kentucky	Parkway Field; Louisville, KY	W 34–20		
November 22	at Mississippi Southern	Mississippi Veterans Memorial Stadium; Jackson, MS	L 26–55	15,000	
