= 1952 Chattanooga Moccasins football team =

American college football season

1952 Chattanooga Moccasins football
- Conference: Independent
- Record: 7–3
- Head coach: Scrappy Moore (22nd season)
- Captain: Bob Heil
- Home stadium: Chamberlain Field

1952 Southern college football independents records
	Conf.			Overall
Team	W	L	T	W		L		T
Maryland State		–		9	–	1	–	0
Mississippi Southern		–		10	–	2	–	0
Virginia		–		8	–	2	–	0
Sewanee		–		7	–	2	–	0
No. 17 Navy		–		6	–	2	–	1
Arkansas State		–		8	–	3	–	0
Tampa		–		8	–	3	–	1
Chattanooga		–		7	–	3	–	0
Northeast Louisiana State		–		5	–	4	–	0
Delaware		–		4	–	4	–	0
Louisville		–		3	–	5	–	0
Miami (FL)		–		4	–	7	–	0
Marshall		–		2	–	7	–	2
Memphis State		–		2	–	7	–	0
Florida State		–		1	–	8	–	1
Rankings from AP Poll

The 1952 Chattanooga Moccasins football team was an American football team that represented the University of Chattanooga (now known as the University of Tennessee at Chattanooga) as an independent during the 1952 college football season. In its 22nd year under head coach Scrappy Moore, the team compiled a 7–3 record.

== Schedule ==
Date	Opponent	Site	Result	Attendance	Source
September 19	Georgetown (KY)	Chamberlain Field; Chattanooga, TN	W 86–0	7,500	
September 26	Abilene Christian	Chamberlain Field; Chattanooga, TN	W 28–0	8,000	
October 3	Middle Tennessee	Chamberlain Field; Chattanooga, TN	W 39–13		
October 11	at Tennessee	Shields–Watkins Field; Knoxville, TN	L 6–26	20,000	
October 17	Memphis State^{†}	Chamberlain Field; Chattanooga, TN	W 23–6	8,500	
October 25	at Mississippi Southern	Faulkner Field; Hattiesburg, MS	L 14–27	12,000	
October 31	Louisville	Chamberlain Field; Chattanooga, TN	W 47–14		
November 8	at No. 16 Alabama	Denny Stadium; Tuscaloosa, AL	L 28–42	18,000	
November 15	at Tampa	Phillips Field; Tampa, FL	W 30–7	10,000	
November 27	Dayton	Chamberlain Field; Chattanooga, TN	W 40–7	8,500-9,000	
^{†}Homecoming; Rankings from AP Poll released prior to the game
