= 1952 Texas Southern Tigers football team =

American college football season

1952 Texas Southern Tigers football

MWAA co-champion

Prairie View Bowl, W 13–12 vs. Prairie View A&M
- Conference: Midwest Athletic Association
- Record: 10–0–1 (2–0–1 MWAA)
- Head coach: Alexander Durley (4th season)
- Home stadium: Public School Stadium

1952 Midwest Athletic Association football standings
	Conf.					Overall
Team	W		L		T	W		L		T
No. 2 Lincoln (MO) +	4	–	0	–	1	8	–	0	–	1
No. 3 Texas Southern +	2	–	0	–	1	10	–	0	–	1
No. 6 Tennessee A&I	2	–	1	–	0	8	–	2	–	0
No. 12 Grambling	1	–	1	–	1	7	–	3	–	1
No. 14 Central State (OH)	1	–	2	–	0	4	–	4	–	0
Jackson	0	–	2	–	1	3	–	5	–	1
No. 23 Kentucky State	0	–	4	–	0	4	–	6	–	1
+ – Conference co-champions; Rankings from Associated Negro Press

The 1952 Texas Southern Tigers football team was an American football team that represented Texas Southern University as a member of the Midwest Athletic Association (MWAA) during the 1952 college football season. Led by fourth-year head coach Alexander Durley, the Tigers compiled an overall record of 10–0–1, with a mark of 2–0–1 in the MWAA.

== Schedule ==
Date	Opponent	Site	Result	Attendance	Source
September 22	Butler College*	Public School Stadium; Houston, TX	W 65–0		
September 27	Southern*	Public School Stadium; Houston, TX	W 14–7	3,700	
October 4	at Jackson	Alumni Field; Jackson, MS	W 20–6		
October 11	Grambling	Public School Stadium; Houston, TX	W 46–14		
October 25	Lincoln (MO)^{†}	Public School Stadium; Houston, TX	T 13–13	10,000	
November 1	at Xavier (LA)*	Xavier Stadium; New Orleans, LA	W 12–7	5,000	
November 8	at Paul Quinn*	Katy Park; Waco, TX	W 46–20	2,200	
November 15	at Alcorn A&M*	Henderson Stadium; Lorman, MS	W 19–0		
November 22	Bishop*	Public School Stadium; Houston, TX	W 85–0		
December 6	vs. Arkansas AM&N*	Little Rock, AR (Rock Bowl)	W 31–14		
January 1, 1953	vs. Prairie View A&M*	Buffalo Stadium; Houston, TX (Prairie View Bowl)	W 13–12	13,000	
*Non-conference game; ^{†}Homecoming
