= 1952 East Texas State Lions football team =

American college football season

1952 East Texas State Lions football

LSC champion Tangerine Bowl champion

Tangerine Bowl, W 33–0 vs. Tennessee Tech
- Conference: Lone Star Conference
- Record: 11–0 (5–0 LSC)
- Head coach: Milburn Smith (2nd season)
- Home stadium: Memorial Stadium

1952 Lone Star Conference football standings
	Conf.					Overall
Team	W		L		T	W		L		T
East Texas State $	5	–	0	–	0	11	–	0	–	0
Southwest Texas State	4	–	1	–	0	7	–	2	–	0
Sam Houston State	2	–	3	–	0	6	–	4	–	0
Sul Ross	2	–	3	–	0	4	–	6	–	0
Lamar Tech	1	–	4	–	0	2	–	7	–	0
Stephen F. Austin	1	–	4	–	0	2	–	7	–	0
$ – Conference champion

The 1952 East Texas State Lions football team was an American football team that represented East Texas State Teachers College—now known as East Texas A&M University–as a member of the Lone Star Conference (LSC) during the 1952 college football season. Led by second-year head coach Milburn Smith, the Lions compiled an overall record of 11–0 with a mark of 5–0 in conference play, winning the LSC title. East Texas State was invited to the Tangerine Bowl, where the Lions beat Tennessee Tech.

== Schedule ==
Date	Time	Opponent	Site	Result	Attendance	Source
September 19		at Abilene Christian*	Fair Park Stadium; Abilene, TX	W 21–0	6,000	
September 27		Trinity (TX)*	Memorial Stadium; Commerce, TX	W 54–34		
October 3		at Southwestern Oklahoma State*	Weatherford, OK	W 65–0		
October 11		at Lamar Tech	Beaumont, TX	W 48–0		
October 18	8:00 p.m.	vs. Midwestern (TX)*	Vernon High School stadium; Vernon, TX	W 46–0	4,000	
October 25		Sam Houston State^{†}	Memorial Stadium; Commerce, TX	W 57–33	10,000	
November 8		at Stephen F. Austin	Nacogdoches, TX	W 54–7		
November 15	8:00 p.m.	Southwest Texas State	Memorial Stadium; Commerce, TX	W 63–23	10,000	
November 22		Austin*	Memorial Stadium; Commerce, TX	W 61–7		
November 29	8:00 p.m.	Sul Ross	Memorial Stadium; Commerce, TX	W 27–7	2,500	
January 1		vs. Tennessee Tech*	Tangerine Bowl; Orlando, FL (Tangerine Bowl)	W 33–0	12,340	
*Non-conference game; ^{†}Homecoming; All times are in Central time
