= 1953 Sun Bowl =

American college football game

Pacific Tigers	Mississippi Southern Southerners
(6–3–1)	(10–1)
Independent	Independent
26	7
Head coach: Ernie Jorge	Head coach: Thad Vann
	1	2	3	4	Total
Pacific	6	7	7	6	26
Mississippi Southern	0	0	0	7	7
- Date: January 1, 1953
- Season: 1952
- Stadium: Kidd Field
- Location: El Paso, Texas
- MVP: HB Tom McCormick (Pacific)
- Referee: M. Edward Wagner (Pacific Coast; split crew: Pacific Coast, SEC)

The 1953 Sun Bowl was a college football postseason bowl game that featured the Pacific Tigers and the Mississippi Southern.

== Background ==
This was the sixth bowl in seven years and second straight Sun Bowl for Pacific. Mississippi Southern came in on a ten-game winning steak after losing to Alabama in the season-opener.

== Game summary ==
A fumble on the kickoff return to begin the second half led to another Pacific touchdown. Four fumbles were lost on the day by the Mississippi Southern. Hugh Laurin Pepper scored the only Mississippi Southern touchdown, with little time remaining. Tom McCormack rushed for three touchdowns, a then record. J. T. Shepard blocked a block and recovered a fumble along with making some tackles, in a losing effort.

== Aftermath ==
The Tigers never returned to a bowl game before the college dissolved the football program in 1995. The Mississippi Southern returned to the Sun Bowl the following year for their second of four bowl appearances in a span five years.
