= 1952 Sam Houston State Bearkats football team =

American college football season

1952 Sam Houston State Bearkats football

Shrimp Bowl, W 41–20 vs. Northeastern State (OK)
- Conference: Lone Star Conference
- Record: 6–4 (2–3 LSC)
- Head coach: Paul Pierce (1st season)
- Home stadium: Pritchett Field

1952 Lone Star Conference football standings
	Conf.					Overall
Team	W		L		T	W		L		T
East Texas State $	5	–	0	–	0	11	–	0	–	0
Southwest Texas State	4	–	1	–	0	7	–	2	–	0
Sam Houston State	2	–	3	–	0	6	–	4	–	0
Sul Ross	2	–	3	–	0	4	–	6	–	0
Lamar Tech	1	–	4	–	0	2	–	7	–	0
Stephen F. Austin	1	–	4	–	0	2	–	7	–	0
$ – Conference champion

The 1952 Sam Houston State Bearkats football team represented Sam Houston State Teachers College (now known as Sam Houston State University) as a member of the Lone Star Conference (LSC) during the 1952 college football season. Led by first-year head coach Paul Pierce, the Bearkats compiled an overall record of 6–4 with a mark of 2–3 in conference play, and finished tied for third in the LSC.

== Schedule ==
Date	Opponent	Site	Result	Attendance	Source
September 20	Louisiana College*	Pritchett Field; Huntsville, TX	W 41–6		
September 29	at Howard Payne*	Brownwood H.S. Stadium; Brownwood, TX	W 38–0		
October 4	at Sul Ross*	Jackson Field; Alpine, TX	L 25–33		
October 11	Texas A&I*	Pritchett Field; Huntsville, TX	W 41–14		
October 18	at Lamar Tech	Greenie Stadium; Beaumont, TX	W 31–13		
October 25	at East Texas State	Memorial Stadium; Commerce, TX	L 33–57	10,000	
November 1	at McNeese State*	Killen Field; Lake Charles, LA	L 26–35		
November 8	Southwest Texas State	Pritchett Field; Huntsville, TX	L 27–35		
November 15	Stephen F. Austin	Pritchett Field; Huntsville, TX (rivalry)	W 32–20		
December 27	vs. Northeastern State (OK)*	Galveston, TX (Shrimp Bowl)	W 41–20	3,500	
*Non-conference game
