= 1952 college football season =

American college football season

- First AP No. 1 of season: Michigan State
- Number of bowls: 8
- Champion(s): Michigan State (AP, Coaches); Georgia Tech (INS)
- Heisman: Billy Vessels (halfback, Oklahoma)

The 1952 college football season was the 84th season of intercollegiate football in the United States. It ended with Oklahoma halfback Billy Vessels winning the Heisman Trophy and Notre Dame halfback Johnny Lattner winning the Maxwell Award. Three teams claim the 1952 national championship:

- Michigan State compiled a perfect 9–0 record and was ranked No. 1 in the final Associated Press (AP) and United Press (UP) coaches polls. The team was also recognized as the 1952 national champion by the Boand System, DeVold System, Dunkel System, College Football Researchers Association, Helms Athletic Foundation, Litkenhous, National Championship Foundation, Sagarin Ratings, and Williamson System. The Spartans ranked third nationally in total offense with an average of 428.7 yards per game. The 1952 season was part of a 28-game winning streak for Michigan State that began in October 1950 and continued until October 1953.
- Georgia Tech compiled a perfect 12–0 record and was ranked No. 1 by the International News Service poll at the end of the regular season. They finished No. 2 in the AP and UP polls. Tech went on to defeat No. 7 Ole Miss in the Sugar Bowl. Georgia Tech was also rated as the 1952 national champion by the Houlgate System and Poling System and later by Berryman (QPRS), Billingsley Report, and Sagarin Ratings. The Yellow Jackets ranked second nationally in total defense, giving up an average of only 173.2 yards per game.
- Clarion Golden Eagles football teamThe 1952 Clarion State Teachers College football team, known as the Golden Eagles, had a perfect, undefeated season, finishing with a 9–0 record. This marked the first time in school history that Clarion completed a season unbeaten. The team was coached by Waldo S. Tippin and capped their season with a 13–6 victory over East Carolina in the Lions Bowl.

Small college teams that compiled perfect seasons in 1952 included East Texas (11–0, Lone Star and Tangerine Bowl champion), Idaho State (8–0, Rocky Mountain champion), Peru State (10–0, part of 26-game winning streak), and Shippensburg (7–0, part of 20-game winning streak). Florida A&M (8–2) was selected by the Associated Negro Press as the black college national champion.

Individual statistical leaders in major college football for the 1952 season included Detroit quarterback Ted Marchibroda with 1,813 yards of total offense, Tulsa halfback Howard Waugh with 1,372 rushing yards, Georgia quarterback Zeke Bratkowski with 1,824 passing yards, Fordham end Ed Brown with 774 receiving yards, and Mississippi State quarterback Jackie Parker with 120 points scored.

Tulsa led the major colleges in total offense with an average of 466.6 yards per game. Tennessee led in total defense, giving up an average of only 166.7 yards per game..

== Conference and program changes ==
=== Conference changes ===
- One conference changed its name this year:
  - The Wisconsin State Teachers College Conference, an active NCAA Division III conference currently known as the Wisconsin Intercollegiate Athletic Conference (WIAC), changed its name to the Wisconsin State College Conference

=== Membership changes ===
School	1951 Conference	1952 Conference
Arizona State–Flagstaff (NAU) Lumberjacks	Border	NMIC
Bowling Green Falcons	Independent	MAC
Bradley Braves	Missouri Valley	Independent
Drake Bulldogs	Missouri Valley	Independent
Loyola Marymount Lions	Independent	Dropped Program
San Francisco Dons	Independent	Dropped Program
Toledo Rockets	Independent	MAC

== September ==
September 20 Maryland won at Missouri 13–10, and Texas won at LSU 35–14. In the preseason poll released on September 22, 1952, the Michigan State Spartans were rated first, followed by the Maryland Terrapins. Maryland actually had more first place votes 79 to 77, but MSU had an edge on points, 1720–1696. The remainder of the Top Five was No. 3 Georgia Tech (which beat The Citadel 54–6), No. 4 Oklahoma and No. 5 Illinois. Defending champion Tennessee was 6th. As the regular season progressed, a new poll would be issued on the Monday following the weekend's games.

On September 27 No. 1 Michigan State won at Michigan, 27–13. No. 2 Maryland beat Auburn 13–7 in Birmingham. No. 3 Georgia Tech narrowly beat Florida 17–14 and fell to 6th place in the next poll. No. 4 Oklahoma visited Colorado and was tied, 21–21. No. 5 Illinois, which beat Iowa State 33–7, rose to second place in the next poll. No. 8 California, which was 2–0–0 after a 28–14 win over Missouri, and No. 11 Texas (which had won at North Carolina 28–7), moved into the top five. The poll: No. 1 Michigan State, No. 2 Illinois, No. 3 Maryland, No. 4 California, and No. 5 Texas.

== October ==
October 4 No. 1 Michigan State narrowly defeated Oregon State 17–14 at Portland. No. 2 Illinois lost at No. 8 Wisconsin, 20–6, and would end up finishing 1952 with a losing (4–5–0) record. No. 3 Maryland beat Clemson 28–0. No. 4 California won at Minnesota, 49–13. No. 5 Texas lost 14–3 to No. 19 Notre Dame. No. 6 Georgia Tech, which beat SMU 20–7 in Dallas, returned to the Top Five. The next poll featured No. 1 Wisconsin, No. 2 Michigan State, No. 3 California, No. 4 Maryland, and No. 5 Georgia Tech.

October 11 The new No. 1, Wisconsin, lost at Columbus to unranked Ohio State, 23–14. No. 2 Michigan State beat visiting Texas A&M 48–6. No. 3 California beat Oregon at Portland, 41–7. No. 4 Maryland won at Georgia, 37–0. No. 5 Georgia Tech beat Tulane 14–0. No. 6 Duke, which won at South Carolina 33–7, was fifth in the next poll: No. 1 Michigan State, No. 2 Maryland, No. 3 California, No. 4 Georgia Tech, and No. 5 Duke.

October 18 No. 1 Michigan State beat visiting Syracuse 48–7. No. 2 Maryland beat No. 20 Navy 38–7. No. 3 California beat Santa Clara 27–7. No. 4 Georgia Tech beat Auburn 33–0. No. 5 Duke won at N.C. State, 57–0, but was still bounced out of the top five. No. 6 Oklahoma, which had won at No. 8 Kansas 42–20, was third in the next poll: No. 1 Michigan State, No. 2 Maryland, No. 3 Oklahoma, No. 4 California, and No. 5 Georgia Tech.

October 25 No. 1 Michigan State beat No. 17 Penn State 34–7. No. 2 Maryland beat LSU 34–6. No. 3 Oklahoma beat Kansas State 49–6. In Los Angeles, a matchup of unbeaten teams pitted No. 4 California (5–0–0) against the 5–0–0 and No. 7 USC Trojans. USC won 10–0. Cal would lose this and the next two games after its perfect start. No. 5 Georgia Tech beat Vanderbilt 30–0. The next poll: No. 1 Michigan State, No. 2 Maryland, No. 3 Oklahoma, No. 4 Georgia Tech, and No. 5 USC.

== November ==
November 1 No. 1 Michigan State narrowly won at No. 8 Purdue, 14–7. No. 2 Maryland won at Boston University, 34–7. No. 3 Oklahoma won at Iowa State 41–0. No. 4 Georgia Tech (6–0–0) faced unbeaten No. 6 Duke (also 6–0–0) and won 28–7. No. 5 USC was idle, and its place was taken by No. 7 UCLA, which handed No. 11 California a 28–7 defeat. The next poll: No. 1 Michigan State, No. 2 Maryland, No. 3 Georgia Tech, No. 4 Oklahoma, and No. 5 UCLA.

November 8 No. 1 Michigan State won at Indiana 41–14. No. 2 Maryland was idle. No. 3 Georgia Tech beat Army 45–6. No. 4 Oklahoma lost at No. 10 Notre Dame, 27–21, and dropped back out of the Top Five. No. 5 UCLA beat visiting Oregon State 57–0. No. 6 USC rose to fifth after a 54–7 win at Stanford. The next poll: No. 1. Michigan State, No. 2 Georgia Tech, No. 3 Maryland, No. 4 UCLA, and No. 5 USC.

November 15 Unbeaten No. 1 Michigan State hosted once-beaten (5–1–1) No. 6 Notre Dame and won 21–3. In Atlanta, unbeaten (8–0–0) No. 2 Georgia Tech faced once-beaten (7–1–0) No. 12 Alabama and won, 7–3. And on the road, unbeaten (7–0–0) No. 3 Maryland lost at unbeaten (6–0–2) No. 11 Mississippi, 21–14. No. 4 UCLA was idle. No. 5 USC beat No. 17 Washington 33–0. No. 8 Oklahoma, which had beaten Missouri 47–7, returned to the Top Five. The next poll: No. 1 Michigan State, No. 2 Georgia Tech, No. 3 UCLA, No. 4 USC, and No. 5 Oklahoma.

November 22 No. 1 Michigan State won 62–13 over Marquette to close its season unbeaten. No. 2 Georgia Tech also stayed unbeaten as it beat Florida State 30–0. No. 3 UCLA and No. 4 USC (both 8–0–0) met in Los Angeles, with USC winning 14–12 to take the crown of the Pacific Coast Conference and a trip to the Rose Bowl. No. 5 Oklahoma beat Nebraska 34–13. The new poll: No. 1 Michigan State, No. 2 USC, No. 3 Georgia Tech, No. 4 Oklahoma, and No. 5 UCLA.

November 29 No. 1 Michigan State had closed its season. No. 2 USC hosted No. 7 Notre Dame and lost 9–0. No. 3 Georgia Tech finished its season unbeaten (11–0–0) with a 23–9 win over Georgia. The Yellow Jackets were invited to the Sugar Bowl to face unbeaten, but twice tied (8–0–2) and No. 6 Mississippi, a conference rival whom they had not faced during the regular season. No. 4 Oklahoma closed its season at Oklahoma A&M, winning 54–7 to finish 8–1–1. In the final AP poll, released December 1, No. 1 Michigan State was the champion, followed by No. 2 Georgia Tech, No. 3 Notre Dame, No. 4 Oklahoma, and No. 5 USC.

== Conference standings ==
=== Major conference standings ===
1952 Big Seven Conference football standings
	Conf.					Overall
Team	W		L		T	W		L		T
No. 4 Oklahoma $	5	–	0	–	1	8	–	1	–	1
Missouri	5	–	1	–	0	5	–	5	–	0
Nebraska	3	–	2	–	1	5	–	4	–	1
Kansas	3	–	3	–	0	7	–	3	–	0
Colorado	2	–	2	–	2	6	–	2	–	2
Iowa State	1	–	5	–	0	3	–	6	–	0
Kansas State	0	–	6	–	0	1	–	9	–	0
$ – Conference champion; Rankings from AP Poll

1952 Big Ten Conference football standings
	Conf.					Overall
Team	W		L		T	W		L		T
No. 11 Wisconsin +	4	–	1	–	1	6	–	3	–	1
No. 18 Purdue +	4	–	1	–	1	4	–	3	–	2
No. 17 Ohio State	5	–	2	–	0	6	–	3	–	0
Michigan	4	–	2	–	0	5	–	4	–	0
Minnesota	3	–	1	–	2	4	–	3	–	2
Illinois	2	–	5	–	0	4	–	5	–	0
Northwestern	2	–	5	–	0	2	–	6	–	1
Iowa	2	–	5	–	0	2	–	7	–	0
Indiana	1	–	5	–	0	2	–	7	–	0
+ – Conference co-champions; Rankings from AP Poll

1952 Border Conference football standings
	Conf.					Overall
Team	W		L		T	W		L		T
Arizona State $	4	–	0	–	0	6	–	3	–	0
Texas Tech	2	–	1	–	1	3	–	7	–	1
Arizona	3	–	2	–	0	6	–	4	–	0
Hardin–Simmons	2	–	2	–	1	5	–	3	–	2
Texas Western	2	–	3	–	1	5	–	5	–	1
New Mexico A&M	1	–	2	–	1	2	–	6	–	1
West Texas State	1	–	4	–	0	3	–	6	–	0
Arizona State–Flagstaff	0	–	1	–	0	3	–	4	–	0
$ – Conference champion

1952 Mid-American Conference football standings
	Conf.					Overall
Team	W		L		T	W		L		T
Cincinnati $	3	–	0	–	0	8	–	1	–	1
Miami (OH)	4	–	1	–	0	8	–	1	–	0
Ohio	5	–	2	–	0	6	–	2	–	2
Bowling Green	2	–	2	–	0	7	–	2	–	0
Kent State	2	–	2	–	0	5	–	4	–	0
Western Michigan	1	–	4	–	0	4	–	4	–	0
Western Reserve	1	–	4	–	0	5	–	4	–	0
Toledo	1	–	4	–	0	4	–	5	–	0
$ – Conference champion

1952 Middle Three Conference football standings
	Conf.					Overall
Team	W		L		T	W		L		T
Lehigh +	1	–	0	–	0	5	–	4	–	0
Rutgers +	1	–	0	–	0	4	–	4	–	1
Lafayette	0	–	2	–	0	0	–	9	–	0
+ – Conference co-champions

1952 Missouri Valley Conference football standings
	Conf.					Overall
Team	W		L		T	W		L		T
Houston $	3	–	0	–	0	8	–	2	–	0
No. 12 Tulsa	3	–	1	–	0	8	–	2	–	1
Oklahoma A&M	2	–	2	–	0	3	–	7	–	0
Detroit	1	–	3	–	0	2	–	7	–	0
Wichita	0	–	3	–	0	3	–	6	–	1
$ – Conference champion; Rankings from AP Poll

1952 Pacific Coast Conference football standings
	Conf.					Overall
Team	W		L		T	W		L		T
No. 5 USC $	6	–	0	–	0	10	–	1	–	0
No. 6 UCLA	5	–	1	–	0	8	–	1	–	0
Washington	6	–	2	–	0	7	–	3	–	0
California	3	–	3	–	0	7	–	3	–	0
Washington State	3	–	4	–	0	4	–	6	–	0
Stanford	2	–	5	–	0	5	–	5	–	0
Oregon	2	–	5	–	0	2	–	7	–	1
Idaho	1	–	3	–	0	4	–	4	–	1
Oregon State	1	–	6	–	0	2	–	7	–	0
$ – Conference champion; Rankings from AP Poll

1952 Skyline Conference football standings
	Conf.					Overall
Team	W		L		T	W		L		T
Utah $	5	–	0	–	0	6	–	3	–	1
New Mexico	5	–	1	–	0	7	–	2	–	0
Colorado A&M	5	–	2	–	0	6	–	4	–	0
Wyoming	4	–	3	–	0	5	–	4	–	0
BYU	3	–	4	–	0	4	–	6	–	0
Utah State	3	–	4	–	0	3	–	7	–	1
Montana	1	–	5	–	0	2	–	7	–	1
Denver	0	–	7	–	0	3	–	7	–	0
$ – Conference champion

1952 Southeastern Conference football standings
	Conf.					Overall
Team	W		L		T	W		L		T
No. 2 Georgia Tech $	7	–	0	–	0	12	–	0	–	0
No. 8 Tennessee	5	–	0	–	1	8	–	2	–	1
No. 7 Ole Miss	4	–	0	–	2	8	–	1	–	2
No. 9 Alabama	4	–	2	–	0	10	–	2	–	0
Georgia	4	–	3	–	0	7	–	4	–	0
No. 15 Florida	3	–	3	–	0	8	–	3	–	0
Mississippi State	3	–	4	–	0	5	–	4	–	0
Tulane	3	–	5	–	0	5	–	5	–	0
No. 20 Kentucky	1	–	3	–	2	5	–	4	–	2
LSU	2	–	5	–	0	3	–	7	–	0
Vanderbilt	1	–	4	–	1	3	–	5	–	2
Auburn	0	–	7	–	0	2	–	8	–	0
$ – Conference champion; Rankings from AP Poll

1952 Southern Conference football standings
	Conf.					Overall
Team	W		L		T	W		L		T
No. 16 Duke $	5	–	0	–	0	8	–	2	–	0
Wake Forest	5	–	1	–	0	5	–	4	–	1
West Virginia	5	–	1	–	0	7	–	2	–	0
William & Mary	4	–	1	–	0	4	–	5	–	0
George Washington	4	–	2	–	1	5	–	3	–	1
VPI	4	–	4	–	0	5	–	6	–	0
Furman	2	–	2	–	1	6	–	3	–	1
Washington and Lee	3	–	4	–	0	3	–	7	–	0
VMI	2	–	3	–	1	3	–	6	–	1
NC State	2	–	4	–	0	3	–	7	–	0
South Carolina	2	–	4	–	0	5	–	5	–	0
North Carolina	1	–	2	–	0	2	–	6	–	0
The Citadel	1	–	3	–	1	3	–	5	–	1
Davidson	1	–	6	–	0	2	–	7	–	0
Richmond	0	–	6	–	0	1	–	9	–	0
Maryland †			–			7	–	2	–	0
Clemson †			–			2	–	6	–	1
$ – Conference champion; † League sanctions prevented Maryland and Clemson from conference participation; Rankings from AP Poll

1952 Southwest Conference football standings
	Conf.					Overall
Team	W		L		T	W		L		T
No. 10 Texas $	6	–	0	–	0	9	–	2	–	0
Rice	4	–	2	–	0	5	–	5	–	0
SMU	3	–	2	–	1	4	–	5	–	1
TCU	2	–	2	–	2	4	–	4	–	2
Baylor	1	–	3	–	2	4	–	4	–	2
Texas A&M	1	–	4	–	1	3	–	6	–	1
Arkansas	1	–	5	–	0	2	–	8	–	0
$ – Conference champion; Rankings from AP Poll

=== Independents ===
1952 Eastern college football independents records
	Conf.			Overall
Team	W	L	T	W		L		T
Rochester		–		8	–	0	–	0
Hofstra		–		8	–	1	–	0
No. 19 Princeton		–		8	–	1	–	0
Franklin & Marshall		–		7	–	1	–	0
Villanova		–		7	–	1	–	1
Holy Cross		–		8	–	2	–	0
Yale		–		7	–	2	–	0
Penn State		–		7	–	2	–	1
No. 14 Syracuse		–		7	–	3	–	0
Bucknell		–		6	–	3	–	0
Colgate		–		6	–	3	–	0
Pittsburgh		–		6	–	3	–	0
Carnegie Tech		–		4	–	3	–	0
Harvard		–		5	–	4	–	0
Boston University		–		5	–	4	–	1
Penn		–		4	–	3	–	2
Army		–		4	–	4	–	1
Boston College		–		4	–	4	–	1
Tufts		–		3	–	4	–	1
Drexel		–		3	–	4	–	0
Fordham		–		2	–	5	–	1
NYU		–		2	–	5	–	1
Columbia		–		2	–	6	–	1
Brown		–		2	–	7	–	0
Cornell		–		2	–	7	–	0
Dartmouth		–		2	–	7	–	0
Temple		–		2	–	7	–	1
Buffalo		–		1	–	7	–	0
Rankings from AP Poll

1952 Midwestern college football independents records
	Conf.			Overall
Team	W	L	T	W		L		T
No. 1 Michigan State		–		9	–	0	–	0
Michigan Tech		–		6	–	1	–	0
No. 3 Notre Dame		–		7	–	2	–	1
Carthage		–		5	–	2	–	0
Youngstown		–		4	–	3	–	1
Wabash		–		5	–	4	–	0
Dayton		–		6	–	5	–	0
Baldwin–Wallace		–		4	–	4	–	0
Wayne		–		4	–	4	–	0
Bradley		–		4	–	5	–	0
John Carroll		–		4	–	5	–	0
Washington University		–		4	–	5	–	0
Rose Poly		–		3	–	4	–	1
Xavier		–		4	–	6	–	0
Marquette		–		3	–	5	–	1
Drake		–		2	–	7	–	0
Rankings from AP Poll

1952 Southern college football independents records
	Conf.			Overall
Team	W	L	T	W		L		T
Maryland State		–		9	–	1	–	0
Mississippi Southern		–		10	–	2	–	0
Virginia		–		8	–	2	–	0
Sewanee		–		7	–	2	–	0
No. 17 Navy		–		6	–	2	–	1
Arkansas State		–		8	–	3	–	0
Tampa		–		8	–	3	–	1
Chattanooga		–		7	–	3	–	0
Northeast Louisiana State		–		5	–	4	–	0
Delaware		–		4	–	4	–	0
Louisville		–		3	–	5	–	0
Miami (FL)		–		4	–	7	–	0
Marshall		–		2	–	7	–	2
Memphis State		–		2	–	7	–	0
Florida State		–		1	–	8	–	1
Rankings from AP Poll

1952 Western college football independents records
	Conf.			Overall
Team	W	L	T	W		L		T
Fresno State		–		8	–	2	–	0
Pacific (CA)		–		7	–	3	–	1
San Jose State		–		6	–	3	–	0
La Verne		–		5	–	3	–	1
Hawaii		–		5	–	5	–	2
Cal Poly San Dimas		–		4	–	4	–	0
Nevada		–		2	–	2	–	0
Santa Clara		–		2	–	6	–	1

=== Minor conferences ===
Conference	Champion(s)	Record
California Collegiate Athletic Association	Cal Poly–San Luis Obispo	4–0
Central Church College Conference	Concordia (NE)	3–0
Central Intercollegiate Athletics Association	Virginia State	7–0
Central Intercollegiate Athletic Conference	Kansas State Teachers (Emporia State)	5–0
College Conference of Illinois	Lake Forest; Millikin	3–0–1
Evergreen Conference	Pacific Lutheran	5–0–1
Far Western Conference	Humboldt State College	3–0
Frontier Conference	Carroll (MT)	4–0
Gulf Coast Conference	North Texas State	2–0
Indiana Collegiate Conference	Butler; Valparaiso	3–1
Iowa Intercollegiate Athletic Conference	Buena Vista	2–1
Kansas Collegiate Athletic Conference	McPherson	6–0
Lone Star Conference	East Texas State Teachers	5–0
Michigan Intercollegiate Athletic Association	Albion	5–0
Mid-American Conference	Cincinnati	3–0
Midwest Collegiate Athletic Conference	Coe	6–0
Minnesota Intercollegiate Athletic Conference	Gustavus Adolphus; Concordia–Moorhead	6–0
Missouri Intercollegiate Athletic Association	Northeast Missouri State; Northwest Missouri State	4–1
Nebraska College Conference	Peru State	7–0
New Mexico Intercollegiate Conference	Eastern New Mexico; Panhandle A&M	4–1
North Central Intercollegiate Athletic Conference	Iowa State Teachers (Northern Iowa)	5–1
North Dakota College Athletic Conference	Jamestown College; Minot State Teachers; Valley City State	5–1
Ohio Athletic Conference	Heidelberg	5–1
Ohio Valley Conference	Tennessee Tech; Western Kentucky State	4–1
Oklahoma Collegiate Athletic Conference	Northeastern State College (OK)	5–0
Oregon Collegiate Conference	Oregon College	—
Pacific Northwest Conference	College of Idaho; Pacific (OR)	4–0–1
Pennsylvania State Athletic Conference	West Chester State Teachers	5–0
Rocky Mountain Athletic Conference	Idaho State College	5–0
South Dakota Intercollegiate Conference	Northern State Teachers	4–1
Southern California Intercollegiate Athletic Conference	Whittier	4–0
Southern Intercollegiate Athletic Conference	Bethune–Cookman	5–1
Southwestern Athletic Conference	Prairie View A&M College	6–0
State Teacher's College Conference of Minnesota	Mankato State Teachers; Moorhead State Teachers; St. Cloud State Teachers	3–1
Texas Collegiate Athletic Conference	Abilene Christian	4–0
Wisconsin State College Conference	North: Wisconsin State–La Crosse; South: Wisconsin State–Platteville	5–0; 4–0

=== Minor conference standings ===
1952 Arkansas Intercollegiate Conference football standings
	Conf.					Overall
Team	W		L		T	W		L		T
Southern State (AR) $	5	–	0	–	0	10	–	1	–	0
Henderson State	3	–	2	–	0	4	–	4	–	0
Ozarks	2	–	2	–	1	5	–	2	–	1
Arkansas A&M	2	–	2	–	1	3	–	4	–	1
Arkansas Tech	1	–	4	–	0	1	–	7	–	0
Arkansas State Teachers	1	–	4	–	0	1	–	8	–	0
$ – Conference champion

1952 California Collegiate Athletic Association football standings
	Conf.					Overall
Team	W		L		T	W		L		T
Cal Poly $	4	–	0	–	0	7	–	3	–	0
Santa Barbara	3	–	1	–	0	8	–	2	–	0
San Diego State	2	–	2	–	0	4	–	5	–	0
Los Angeles State	1	–	3	–	0	4	–	4	–	0
Pepperdine	0	–	4	–	0	2	–	7	–	0
$ – Conference champion

1952 Central Church College Conference football standings
	Conf.					Overall
Team	W		L		T	W		L		T
Concordia (NE) $	3	–	0	–	0	6	–	3	–	0
Dana	2	–	1	–	0	3	–	4	–	0
Tarkio	1	–	2	–	0	1	–	7	–	0
York (NE)	0	–	3	–	0	2	–	6	–	0
$ – Conference champion

1952 Central Intercollegiate Athletic Association football standings
	Conf.					Overall
Team	W		L		T	W		L		T
No. 4 Virginia State $	7	–	0	–	0	8	–	1	–	0
No. 19 North Carolina College	4	–	2	–	0	4	–	4	–	0
No. 11 North Carolina A&T	5	–	2	–	0	6	–	4	–	0
West Virginia State	5	–	3	–	0	6	–	4	–	0
No. 20 Morgan State	4	–	2	–	0	4	–	4	–	1
No. 17 Howard	5	–	2	–	1	6	–	2	–	1
Johnson C. Smith	4	–	2	–	0	5	–	2	–	0
No. 21 Hampton	4	–	4	–	0	4	–	5	–	0
St. Augustine's	5	–	2	–	0	7	–	2	–	0
Lincoln (PA)	2	–	3	–	1	5	–	3	–	1
Winston-Salem State	2	–	4	–	0	4	–	4	–	0
Virginia Union	1	–	6	–	0	1	–	8	–	0
Delaware State	1	–	5	–	0	1	–	7	–	0
Bluefield State	1	–	5	–	0	1	–	7	–	0
Saint Paul's (VA)	0	–	6	–	0	0	–	8	–	0
$ – Conference champion; Conference standings were based on the Dickinson System.; Rankings from Associated Negro Press

1952 Central Intercollegiate Conference football standings
	Conf.					Overall
Team	W		L		T	W		L		T
Emporia State $	5	–	0	–	0	7	–	3	–	0
St. Benedict's	3	–	2	–	0	5	–	4	–	0
Washburn	3	–	2	–	0	4	–	5	–	0
Pittsburg State	2	–	2	–	1	5	–	4	–	1
Fort Hays State	0	–	3	–	2	1	–	6	–	2
Southwestern (KS)	0	–	4	–	1	1	–	7	–	1
$ – Conference champion

1952 College Conference of Illinois football standings
	Conf.					Overall
Team	W		L		T	W		L		T
Lake Forest +	3	–	0	–	1	6	–	1	–	1
Millikin +	3	–	0	–	1	6	–	1	–	1
Wheaton (IL)	4	–	1	–	0	7	–	1	–	0
Augustana (IL)	3	–	2	–	0	3	–	5	–	0
Illinois Wesleyan	2	–	2	–	0	2	–	5	–	1
Elmhurst	1	–	3	–	0	3	–	4	–	0
Illinois College	1	–	4	–	0	2	–	5	–	0
North Central (IL)	0	–	5	–	0	0	–	6	–	1
+ – Conference co-champions

1952 Eastern Intercollegiate Athletic Conference football standings
	Conf.					Overall
Team	W		L		T	W		L		T
Elizabeth City State $	4	–	0	–	0	6	–	2	–	0
Fayetteville State	3	–	1	–	0	6	–	4	–	0
Norfolk State	4	–	2	–	0	5	–	2	–	0
Livingstone	2	–	3	–	0	3	–	4	–	0
Miner Teachers	1	–	3	–	0	?	–	?	–	?
Morristown	0	–	5	–	0	?	–	?	–	?
Storer	0	–	1	–	0	?	–	?	–	?
$ – Conference champion

1952 Evergreen Conference football standings
	Conf.					Overall
Team	W		L		T	W		L		T
Pacific Lutheran $	5	–	0	–	1	5	–	2	–	1
Western Washington	4	–	1	–	1	5	–	2	–	1
Puget Sound	4	–	2	–	0	5	–	3	–	1
Whitworth	4	–	2	–	0	4	–	3	–	1
Central Washington	2	–	4	–	0	4	–	4	–	0
Eastern Washington	1	–	5	–	0	1	–	7	–	0
UBC	0	–	6	–	0	0	–	8	–	0
$ – Conference champion

1952 Far Western Conference football standings
	Conf.					Overall
Team	W		L		T	W		L		T
Humboldt State $	3	–	0	–	0	7	–	1	–	0
Cal Aggies	2	–	1	–	0	2	–	7	–	0
San Francisco State	1	–	0	–	0	3	–	6	–	0
Chico State	1	–	3	–	0	1	–	6	–	0
Southern Oregon	0	–	3	–	0	3	–	5	–	0
$ – Conference champion

1952 Hoosier Conference football standings
	Conf.					Overall
Team	W		L		T	W		L		T
Hanover $	6	–	0	–	0	6	–	1	–	2
Earlham	4	–	2	–	0	6	–	2	–	0
Franklin (IN)	4	–	2	–	0	5	–	3	–	0
Indiana Central	3	–	3	–	0	5	–	3	–	0
Anderson (IN)	2	–	4	–	0	3	–	5	–	1
Manchester (IN)	2	–	4	–	0	4	–	4	–	0
Taylor	0	–	6	–	0	0	–	9	–	0
$ – Conference champion

1952 Gulf Coast Conference football standings
	Conf.					Overall
Team	W		L		T	W		L		T
North Texas State $	2	–	0	–	0	7	–	3	–	0
Midwestern (TX)	1	–	1	–	0	6	–	5	–	0
Trinity (TX)	0	–	2	–	0	4	–	6	–	0
$ – Conference champion

1952 Gulf States Conference football standings
	Conf.					Overall
Team	W		L		T	W		L		T
Louisiana Tech +	3	–	0	–	2	6	–	1	–	2
Southeastern Louisiana +	3	–	0	–	2	6	–	1	–	2
Southwestern Louisiana +	3	–	0	–	2	5	–	2	–	2
McNeese State	2	–	3	–	0	7	–	3	–	0
Louisiana College	0	–	4	–	1	3	–	7	–	1
Northwestern State	0	–	4	–	1	1	–	7	–	1
+ – Conference co-champions

1952 Indiana Collegiate Conference football standings
	Conf.					Overall
Team	W		L		T	W		L		T
Butler +	3	–	1	–	1	5	–	3	–	1
Valparaiso +	3	–	1	–	1	5	–	3	–	1
Indiana State	2	–	1	–	2	4	–	1	–	3
Ball State	3	–	2	–	0	3	–	5	–	1
Evansville	2	–	3	–	0	2	–	7	–	0
Saint Joseph's (IN)	0	–	5	–	0	0	–	8	–	0
+ – Conference co-champions

1952 Interstate Intercollegiate Athletic Conference football standings
	Conf.					Overall
Team	W		L		T	W		L		T
Central Michigan $	6	–	0	–	0	7	–	2	–	0
Western Illinois	5	–	1	–	0	7	–	2	–	0
Michigan State Normal	3	–	2	–	1	5	–	3	–	1
Northern Illinois State	2	–	4	–	0	3	–	6	–	0
Southern Illinois	2	–	4	–	0	2	–	6	–	0
Illinois State Normal	1	–	4	–	1	1	–	6	–	2
Eastern Illinois	1	–	5	–	0	2	–	7	–	0
$ – Conference champion

1952 Iowa Conference football standings
	Conf.					Overall
Team	W		L		T	W		L		T
Northern Division
Buena Vista xy$	2	–	1	–	0	5	–	5	–	0
Luther	2	–	1	–	0	3	–	5	–	0
Upper Iowa	1	–	2	–	0	3	–	3	–	0
Wartburg	1	–	2	–	0	2	–	5	–	0
Southern Division
Iowa Wesleyan xy	4	–	0	–	0	7	–	1	–	0
Dubuque	3	–	1	–	0	4	–	4	–	0
Simpson (IA)	2	–	2	–	0	3	–	5	–	0
Parsons	1	–	3	–	0	4	–	4	–	0
Central (IA)	0	–	4	–	0	1	–	7	–	0
Championship: Buena Vista 13, Iowa Wesleyan 7
$ – Conference champion; x – Division champion/co-champions; y – Championship game participant

1952 Kansas Collegiate Athletic Conference football standings
	Conf.					Overall
Team	W		L		T	W		L		T
McPherson $	6	–	0	–	0	8	–	0	–	1
Ottawa	5	–	1	–	0	8	–	1	–	0
Bethany (KS)	3	–	3	–	0	5	–	4	–	0
College of Emporia	2	–	3	–	1	3	–	5	–	1
Baker	2	–	3	–	1	2	–	5	–	1
Kansas Wesleyan	2	–	4	–	0	5	–	4	–	0
Bethel (KS)	0	–	6	–	0	2	–	7	–	0
$ – Conference champion

1952 Lone Star Conference football standings
	Conf.					Overall
Team	W		L		T	W		L		T
East Texas State $	5	–	0	–	0	11	–	0	–	0
Southwest Texas State	4	–	1	–	0	7	–	2	–	0
Sam Houston State	2	–	3	–	0	6	–	4	–	0
Sul Ross	2	–	3	–	0	4	–	6	–	0
Lamar Tech	1	–	4	–	0	2	–	7	–	0
Stephen F. Austin	1	–	4	–	0	2	–	7	–	0
$ – Conference champion

1952 Mason–Dixon Conference football standings
	Conf.					Overall
Team	W		L		T	W		L		T
Randolph–Macon $	3	–	0	–	1	5	–	3	–	1
Hampden–Sydney	2	–	1	–	1	5	–	3	–	1
Johns Hopkins	1	–	2	–	0	4	–	4	–	0
Western Maryland	1	–	2	–	0	4	–	4	–	0
Bridgewater	1	–	2	–	0	2	–	4	–	0
Gallaudet	0	–	1	–	0	1	–	4	–	0
$ – Conference champion; Conference standings were based on the Dickinson Scoring System.

1952 Michigan Intercollegiate Athletic Association football standings
	Conf.					Overall
Team	W		L		T	W		L		T
Albion $	5	–	0	–	0	7	–	1	–	0
Hope	4	–	1	–	0	4	–	5	–	0
Alma	2	–	3	–	0	4	–	4	–	0
Kalamazoo	2	–	3	–	0	3	–	4	–	1
Adrian	1	–	4	–	0	3	–	5	–	1
Hillsdale	1	–	4	–	0	3	–	5	–	0
$ – Conference champion

1952 Mid-Ohio League football standings
	Conf.					Overall
Team	W		L		T	W		L		T
Ohio Northern $	5	–	0	–	0	7	–	2	–	0
Findlay	4	–	1	–	0	6	–	1	–	0
Bluffton	3	–	2	–	0	5	–	4	–	0
Defiance	2	–	3	–	0	4	–	4	–	0
Cedarville	1	–	4	–	0	?	–	?	–	?
Ashland	0	–	5	–	0	0	–	8	–	0
$ – Conference champion

1952 Midlands Conference football standings
	Conf.					Overall
Team	W		L		T	W		L		T
St. Norbert $	4	–	0	–	0	6	–	0	–	0
Loras	3	–	1	–	0	8	–	1	–	0
St. Ambrose	2	–	2	–	0	4	–	5	–	0
Lewis	0	–	3	–	1	2	–	5	–	1
Saint Joseph's (IN)	0	–	3	–	1	0	–	8	–	1
$ – Conference champion

1952 Midwest Athletic Association football standings
	Conf.					Overall
Team	W		L		T	W		L		T
No. 2 Lincoln (MO) +	4	–	0	–	1	8	–	0	–	1
No. 3 Texas Southern +	2	–	0	–	1	10	–	0	–	1
No. 6 Tennessee A&I	2	–	1	–	0	8	–	2	–	0
No. 12 Grambling	1	–	1	–	1	7	–	3	–	1
No. 14 Central State (OH)	1	–	2	–	0	4	–	4	–	0
Jackson	0	–	2	–	1	3	–	5	–	1
No. 23 Kentucky State	0	–	4	–	0	4	–	6	–	1
+ – Conference co-champions; Rankings from Associated Negro Press

1952 Midwest Conference football standings
	Conf.					Overall
Team	W		L		T	W		L		T
Coe $	6	–	0	–	0	7	–	1	–	0
Lawrence	6	–	1	–	0	7	–	1	–	0
Monmouth (IL)	4	–	2	–	0	6	–	2	–	0
St. Olaf	4	–	2	–	0	5	–	3	–	0
Carleton	3	–	4	–	0	3	–	5	–	0
Knox	3	–	4	–	0	3	–	5	–	0
Ripon	2	–	4	–	0	3	–	4	–	0
Cornell (IA)	1	–	6	–	0	2	–	6	–	0
Grinnell	0	–	7	–	0	0	–	8	–	0
$ – Conference champion

1952 Minnesota Intercollegiate Athletic Conference football standings
	Conf.					Overall
Team	W		L		T	W		L		T
Gustavus Adolphus +	6	–	0	–	0	7	–	1	–	0
Concordia (MN) +	6	–	0	–	0	7	–	2	–	0
Hamline	4	–	2	–	0	6	–	2	–	0
Saint John's (MN)	3	–	3	–	0	5	–	3	–	0
St. Thomas (MN)	3	–	3	–	0	3	–	5	–	0
Macalester	2	–	2	–	1	2	–	4	–	1
Augsburg	2	–	4	–	0	3	–	5	–	0
Saint Mary's (MN)	0	–	5	–	1	1	–	5	–	1
Minnesota–Duluth	0	–	6	–	0	0	–	7	–	1
+ – Conference co-champions

1952 Minnesota Teachers College Conference football standings
	Conf.					Overall
Team	W		L		T	W		L		T
Moorhead State +	3	–	1	–	0	5	–	2	–	0
St. Cloud State +	3	–	1	–	0	5	–	4	–	0
Mankato State +	3	–	1	–	0	4	–	4	–	0
Winona State	1	–	3	–	0	1	–	6	–	1
Bemidji State	0	–	4	–	0	2	–	4	–	0
+ – Conference co-champions; Bemidji State forfeited a conference win over Winona State because of an ineligible player.

1952 Missouri College Athletic Union football standings
	Conf.					Overall
Team	W		L		T	W		L		T
Missouri Valley $	4	–	0	–	0	6	–	4	–	0
William Jewell	3	–	1	–	0	10	–	1	–	1
Culver–Stockton	2	–	2	–	0	2	–	5	–	0
Central (MO)	1	–	3	–	0	1	–	7	–	0
Tarkio *	0	–	4	–	0	1	–	7	–	0
$ – Conference champion; * – Forfeited to Missouri Valley and William Jewell

1952 Missouri Intercollegiate Athletic Association football standings
	Conf.					Overall
Team	W		L		T	W		L		T
NE Missouri State +	4	–	1	–	0	7	–	1	–	0
NW Missouri State +	4	–	1	–	0	6	–	3	–	0
Missouri–Rolla	3	–	2	–	0	3	–	5	–	0
SE Missouri State	2	–	3	–	0	4	–	4	–	0
SW Missouri State	1	–	4	–	0	3	–	6	–	0
Central Missouri State	1	–	4	–	0	1	–	6	–	0
+ – Conference co-champions

1952 Montana Collegiate Conference football standings
	Conf.					Overall
Team	W		L		T	W		L		T
Carroll (MT) $	4	–	0	–	0	8	–	2	–	0
Rocky Mountain	3	–	1	–	0	?	–	?	–	?
Montana Mines	2	–	2	–	0	?	–	?	–	?
Western Montana	1	–	3	–	0	?	–	?	–	?
Eastern Montana	0	–	4	–	0	0	–	5	–	0
$ – Conference champion

1952 Nebraska College Conference football standings
	Conf.					Overall
Team	W		L		T	W		L		T
Peru State $	7	–	0	–	0	10	–	0	–	0
Hastings	5	–	2	–	0	6	–	2	–	0
Doane	4	–	3	–	0	4	–	5	–	0
Nebraska Wesleyan	4	–	3	–	0	5	–	5	–	0
Kearney State	3	–	4	–	0	5	–	4	–	0
Wayne State (NE)	3	–	4	–	0	4	–	5	–	0
Chadron State	2	–	5	–	0	3	–	6	–	0
Midland	0	–	7	–	0	2	–	7	–	0
$ – Conference champion

1952 New Mexico Conference football standings
	Conf.					Overall
Team	W		L		T	W		L		T
Eastern New Mexico +	4	–	1	–	0	7	–	1	–	1
Panhandle A&M +	4	–	1	–	0	7	–	3	–	0
New Mexico Military	2	–	2	–	1	?	–	?	–	?
Adams State	2	–	2	–	1	2	–	5	–	1
New Mexico Western	2	–	3	–	0	4	–	3	–	0
New Mexico Highlands	0	–	5	–	0	1	–	7	–	0
$ – Conference champion

1952 North Central Conference football standings
	Conf.					Overall
Team	W		L		T	W		L		T
Iowa State Teachers $	5	–	1	–	0	6	–	2	–	0
North Dakota State	4	–	2	–	0	5	–	4	–	0
South Dakota	3	–	2	–	1	4	–	3	–	1
South Dakota State	3	–	2	–	1	4	–	4	–	1
Morningside	3	–	3	–	0	5	–	3	–	0
North Dakota	2	–	4	–	0	3	–	6	–	0
Augustana (SD)	0	–	6	–	0	0	–	9	–	0
$ – Conference champion

1952 North Dakota Intercollegiate Conference football standings
	Conf.					Overall
Team	W		L		T	W		L		T
Minot State +	5	–	1	–	0	6	–	2	–	0
Jamestown +	5	–	1	–	0	5	–	2	–	0
Valley City State +	5	–	1	–	0	5	–	3	–	0
Ellendale	4	–	1	–	1	4	–	2	–	1
Dickinson State	3	–	3	–	0	5	–	3	–	0
Mayville State	2	–	3	–	1	2	–	3	–	1
Wahpeton Science	1	–	5	–	0	2	–	5	–	0
Bismarck JC	1	–	5	–	0	1	–	5	–	0
Bottineau	0	–	6	–	0	0	–	6	–	0
+ – Conference co-champions

1952 North State Conference football standings
	Conf.					Overall
Team	W		L		T	W		L		T
Lenoir Rhyne $	6	–	0	–	0	8	–	1	–	0
East Carolina	4	–	1	–	1	6	–	3	–	2
Catawba	4	–	1	–	1	4	–	5	–	1
Appalachian State	2	–	4	–	0	2	–	6	–	1
Western Carolina	1	–	4	–	0	2	–	8	–	0
Guilford	1	–	4	–	0	1	–	7	–	0
Elon	1	–	5	–	0	3	–	6	–	1
$ – Conference champion

1952 Northwest Conference football standings
	Conf.					Overall
Team	W		L		T	W		L		T
Pacific (OR) +	4	–	0	–	1	7	–	0	–	1
College of Idaho +	4	–	0	–	1	7	–	1	–	1
Willamette	3	–	2	–	0	5	–	2	–	2
Linfield	2	–	3	–	0	5	–	3	–	1
Lewis & Clark	1	–	4	–	0	1	–	6	–	1
Whitman	0	–	5	–	0	3	–	6	–	0
+ – Conference co-champions

1952 Ohio Athletic Conference football standings
	Conf.					Overall
Team	W		L		T	W		L		T
Heidelberg $	5	–	1	–	0	8	–	1	–	0
Wooster	4	–	1	–	1	7	–	1	–	1
Muskingum	5	–	2	–	0	6	–	3	–	0
Ohio Wesleyan	5	–	2	–	0	6	–	3	–	0
Denison	4	–	2	–	0	4	–	4	–	0
Hiram	3	–	3	–	0	5	–	3	–	0
Akron	2	–	2	–	1	2	–	6	–	1
Capital	2	–	3	–	0	4	–	4	–	0
Oberlin	2	–	3	–	0	3	–	5	–	0
Wittenberg	2	–	4	–	0	5	–	4	–	0
Otterbein	2	–	5	–	0	2	–	6	–	0
Kenyon	1	–	3	–	0	3	–	3	–	0
Marietta	1	–	4	–	0	2	–	5	–	1
Mount Union	1	–	4	–	0	1	–	7	–	0
$ – Conference champion

1952 Ohio Valley Conference football standings
	Conf.					Overall
Team	W		L		T	W		L		T
Western Kentucky +	4	–	1	–	0	9	–	1	–	0
Tennessee Tech +	4	–	1	–	0	9	–	2	–	0
Murray State	3	–	2	–	0	4	–	4	–	0
Middle Tennessee	2	–	2	–	0	6	–	5	–	0
Eastern Kentucky	0	–	3	–	1	3	–	4	–	1
Morehead State	0	–	4	–	1	1	–	6	–	1
$ – Conference champion

1952 Oklahoma Collegiate Conference football standings
	Conf.					Overall
Team	W		L		T	W		L		T
Northeastern State $	5	–	0	–	0	9	–	1	–	0
Central State (OK)	3	–	2	–	0	4	–	4	–	0
East Central	3	–	2	–	0	4	–	5	–	0
SE Oklahoma State	2	–	3	–	0	4	–	4	–	0
SW Oklahoma State	2	–	3	–	0	3	–	6	–	0
NW Oklahoma State	0	–	5	–	0	3	–	6	–	0
$ – Conference champion

1952 Oregon Collegiate Conference football standings
	Conf.					Overall
Team	W		L		T	W		L		T
Oregon College $	3	–	0	–	0	3	–	3	–	0
Oregon Tech	2	–	1	–	0	7	–	3	–	0
Eastern Oregon	1	–	2	–	0	3	–	5	–	0
Portland State	0	–	3	–	0	0	–	9	–	0
$ – Conference champion

1952 Pennsylvania State Teachers College Conference football standings
	Conf.					Overall
Team	W		L		T	W		L		T
West Chester $	5	–	0	–	0	7	–	0	–	0
Shippensburg	5	–	0	–	0	7	–	0	–	0
Clarion	4	–	0	–	0	9	–	0	–	0
Bloomsburg	2	–	1	–	1	5	–	2	–	1
Slippery Rock	2	–	2	–	0	4	–	3	–	1
Kutztown	3	–	3	–	0	3	–	4	–	0
Lock Haven	4	–	3	–	0	5	–	3	–	0
California (PA)	2	–	2	–	1	3	–	4	–	1
East Stroudsburg	1	–	3	–	0	4	–	4	–	0
Millersville	3	–	4	–	0	3	–	4	–	0
Indiana (PA)	1	–	4	–	0	4	–	4	–	0
Edinboro	1	–	4	–	0	3	–	4	–	0
Mansfield	1	–	5	–	0	2	–	6	–	0
Cheyney	0	–	3	–	0	1	–	5	–	0
$ – Conference champion; Conference standings were based on the Saylor system of ratings.

1952 Rocky Mountain Conference football standings
	Conf.					Overall
Team	W		L		T	W		L		T
Idaho State $	5	–	0	–	0	8	–	0	–	0
Colorado College	4	–	1	–	0	7	–	2	–	0
Colorado State–Greeley	3	–	2	–	0	5	–	3	–	0
Colorado Mines	2	–	3	–	0	4	–	5	–	0
Montana State	1	–	4	–	0	2	–	5	–	0
Western State (CO)	0	–	5	–	0	2	–	6	–	0
$ – Conference champion

1952 Smoky Mountain Conference football standings
	Conf.					Overall
Team	W		L		T	W		L		T
Emory and Henry $	1	–	0	–	0	8	–	2	–	0
Carson–Newman	0	–	1	–	0	3	–	7	–	0
$ – Conference champion

1952 South Dakota Intercollegiate Conference football standings
	Conf.					Overall
Team	W		L		T	W		L		T
Northern State $	4	–	1	–	0	6	–	1	–	0
Huron	6	–	2	–	0	6	–	2	–	0
Yankton	4	–	2	–	0	5	–	2	–	0
Black Hills	3	–	2	–	0	5	–	3	–	0
Southern State (SD)	4	–	3	–	0	4	–	3	–	0
Dakota Wesleyan	3	–	3	–	0	3	–	4	–	0
South Dakota Mines	2	–	4	–	0	2	–	5	–	0
General Beadle	1	–	4	–	0	1	–	4	–	0
Sioux Falls	0	–	6	–	0	0	–	7	–	0
$ – Conference champion

1952 Southeastern Athletic Conference football standings
	Conf.					Overall
Team	W		L		T	W		L		T
Morris $	5	–	0	–	0	6	–	2	–	0
Albany State	4	–	1	–	0	7	–	3	–	0
Claflin	3	–	2	–	0	4	–	5	–	0
Savannah State	1	–	4	–	0	1	–	8	–	0
Florida Normal	1	–	3	–	0	2	–	4	–	0
Paine	0	–	4	–	0	1	–	5	–	0
$ – Conference champion; Standings were based on Dickinson System ratings.

1952 Southern California Intercollegiate Athletic Conference football standings
	Conf.					Overall
Team	W		L		T	W		L		T
Whittier $	4	–	0	–	0	9	–	1	–	0
Occidental	3	–	1	–	0	4	–	4	–	0
Pomona	2	–	2	–	0	2	–	5	–	0
Redlands	1	–	3	–	0	2	–	7	–	0
Caltech	0	–	4	–	0	0	–	7	–	0
$ – Conference champion

1952 Southern Intercollegiate Athletic Conference football standings
	Conf.					Overall
Team	W		L		T	W		L		T
Bethune–Cookman $	5	–	1	–	0	9	–	1	–	0
South Carolina State	5	–	1	–	0	7	–	2	–	0
Fisk	5	–	1	–	0	6	–	2	–	0
Florida A&M	4	–	1	–	0	8	–	2	–	0
Allen	4	–	1	–	0	6	–	4	–	0
Lane	2	–	1	–	0	6	–	2	–	0
Morris Brown	4	–	2	–	0	7	–	3	–	0
Xavier (LA)	3	–	2	–	0	4	–	5	–	0
Fort Valley State	4	–	4	–	1	5	–	4	–	1
Alabama State	3	–	4	–	0	4	–	5	–	0
Clark (GA)	3	–	5	–	0	3	–	5	–	0
Knoxville	1	–	2	–	0	2	–	5	–	0
Alabama A&M	1	–	4	–	2	1	–	5	–	2
Morehouse	1	–	5	–	1	3	–	5	–	1
Tuskegee	1	–	6	–	2	2	–	6	–	2
Benedict	1	–	6	–	0	2	–	6	–	0
$ – Conference champion

1952 Southwestern Athletic Conference football standings
	Conf.					Overall
Team	W		L		T	W		L		T
No. 5 Prairie View A&M $	6	–	0	–	0	7	–	2	–	0
No. 10 Southern	5	–	1	–	0	9	–	2	–	0
No. 13 Texas College	3	–	2	–	1	4	–	3	–	1
Arkansas AM&N	2	–	2	–	2	3	–	6	–	2
Wiley	2	–	4	–	0	4	–	5	–	0
Langston	1	–	4	–	1	2	–	6	–	1
Bishop	0	–	6	–	0	2	–	8	–	0
$ – Conference champion; Rankings from Associated Negro Press

1952 Texas Conference football standings
	Conf.					Overall
Team	W		L		T	W		L		T
Abilene Christian $	4	–	0	–	0	6	–	3	–	1
McMurry	3	–	1	–	0	4	–	4	–	1
Texas A&I	1	–	3	–	0	3	–	8	–	0
Howard Payne	1	–	3	–	0	3	–	6	–	0
Austin	1	–	3	–	0	2	–	7	–	0
$ – Conference champion

1952 Virginia Little Six Conference football standings
	Conf.					Overall
Team	W		L		T	W		L		T
Hampden–Sydney $	2	–	0	–	1	5	–	3	–	1
Emory and Henry	1	–	1	–	0	8	–	2	–	0
Randolph–Macon	1	–	1	–	1	5	–	3	–	1
Bridgewater	0	–	2	–	0	2	–	4	–	0
$ – Conference champion

1952 West Virginia Intercollegiate Athletic Conference football standings
	Conf.					Overall
Team	W		L		T	W		L		T
Fairmont State $	5	–	0	–	0	6	–	0	–	0
Morris Harvey	4	–	0	–	0	6	–	3	–	0
West Virginia Tech	3	–	1	–	0	6	–	3	–	0
Davis & Elkins	4	–	3	–	0	4	–	5	–	0
Potomac State	2	–	2	–	1	3	–	2	–	1
Glenville State	3	–	3	–	0	3	–	3	–	0
Concord	3	–	3	–	1	3	–	4	–	1
West Liberty State	2	–	5	–	0	2	–	7	–	0
Salem	0	–	7	–	0	0	–	7	–	0
Shepherd *	1	–	1	–	0	5	–	3	–	1
Bethany (WV) *	0	–	1	–	0	1	–	6	–	0
$ – Conference champion; * – Did not qualify for conference standings Conference standings based on power ratings

1952 Wisconsin State College Conference football standings
	Conf.					Overall
Team	W		L		T	W		L		T
Northern Division
La Crosse State x+	4	–	0	–	0	8	–	1	–	0
River Falls State	2	–	1	–	1	5	–	2	–	1
Superior State	2	–	2	–	0	2	–	3	–	1
Stout Institute	1	–	3	–	0	3	–	5	–	0
Eau Claire State	0	–	3	–	1	2	–	5	–	1
Southern Division
Platteville State x+	4	–	0	–	0	5	–	1	–	0
Stevens Point State	3	–	1	–	0	7	–	1	–	0
Oshkosh State	2	–	2	–	0	2	–	3	–	0
Whitewater State	1	–	3	–	0	2	–	4	–	0
Milwaukee State	0	–	4	–	0	0	–	8	–	0
+ – Conference co-champions; x – Division champion/co-champions

1952 Yankee Conference football standings
	Conf.					Overall
Team	W		L		T	W		L		T
Connecticut +	3	–	1	–	0	5	–	3	–	0
Maine +	3	–	1	–	0	4	–	3	–	0
Rhode Island +	3	–	1	–	0	7	–	1	–	0
UMass	1	–	2	–	0	4	–	3	–	1
Vermont	0	–	1	–	0	2	–	5	–	0
New Hampshire	0	–	4	–	0	2	–	4	–	1
+ – Conference co-champions

== Bowl games ==
As late as 1952, many colleges, and some football conferences, did not participate in postseason bowl games. No. 1 Michigan State had joined the Big Ten conference in 1950 for football, but as part of the terms of membership, was ineligible to play in a bowl game until the 1953 season. No. 3 Notre Dame had a policy against playing in postseason games. No. 4 Oklahoma was a member of the Big 7 conference (which later, as the Big 8 and Big 12, would send its best team to the Orange Bowl), and that conference banned post-season games. The Oklahoma University Board of Regents considered a motion to allow the team to accept an invitation from the Orange Bowl, and passed a resolution that stated that "Oklahoma belongs to the Big Seven Conference and has followed its rules in the past and should follow them in the future.". Thus, three of the nation's four "top teams" did not play in a bowl game. The exception was Georgia Tech, which played as the SEC champ in the Sugar Bowl. In a forerunner of the SEC championship game, the two best teams in the conference met, with No. 7 Ole Miss accepting the invitation to play against Tech.

=== Major bowls ===
Bowl game	Winning team		Losing team	
Sugar Bowl	No. 2 Georgia Tech	24	No. 7 Ole Miss	7
Rose Bowl	No. 5 USC	7	No. 11 Wisconsin	0
Cotton Bowl	No. 10 Texas	16	No. 8 Tennessee	0
Orange Bowl	No. 9 Alabama	61	No. 14 Syracuse	6

=== Other bowls ===
Bowl game	Winning team		Losing team	
Gator Bowl	No. 15 Florida	14	No. 12 Tulsa	13
Refrigerator Bowl	Western Kentucky	34	Arkansas State	19
Sun Bowl	Pacific (CA)	26	Mississippi Southern	7
Tangerine Bowl	East Texas State	33	Tennessee Tech	0

== Heisman Trophy voting ==
The Heisman Trophy is given to the year's most outstanding player

Player	School	Position	1st	2nd	3rd	Total
Billy Vessels	Oklahoma	HB	98	91	49	525
Jack Scarbath	Maryland	QB	70	57	43	367
Paul Giel	Minnesota	HB	76	38	25	329
Donn Moomaw	UCLA	C/LB	54	32	31	257
Johnny Lattner	Notre Dame	HB	35	45	58	253
Paul Cameron	UCLA	HB	40	35	28	218
Jim Sears	USC	HB	38	21	17	173
Don McAuliffe	Michigan State	HB	26	29	28	164
Don Heinrich	Washington	QB	19	28	40	153
Tom Catlin	Oklahoma	C	25	26	23	150

== Statistical leaders ==
=== Individual ===
==== Total offense ====
The following players were the individual leaders in total offense among major college football players during the 1952 season:
1. Ted Marchibroda, Detroit, 1,813 yards
2. Zeke Bratkowski, Georgia, 1,774 yards
3. Tommy O'Connell, Illinois, 1,724 yards
4. Don Heinrich, Washington, 1,652 yards
5. Chuck Maloy, Holy Cross, 1,589 yards
6. Gene Rossi, Cincinnati, 1,588 yards
7. Ronnie Morris, Tulsa, 1,571 yards
8. Dick Shinaut, Texas Western, 1,527 yards
9. John Borton, Ohio State, 1,512 yards
10. Bill Brehany, VMI, 1,497 yards

==== Passing ====
The following players were the individual leaders in pass completions among major college football players during the 1952 season:
1. Don Heinrich, Washington, 137 of 270 (50.7%), 1,647 yards, 17 interceptions, 13 touchdowns
2. Tommy O'Connell, Illinois, 133 of 224 (59.4%), 1,761 yards, 17 interceptions, 12 touchdowns
3. Zeke Bratkowski, Georgia, 131 of 262 (50.0%), 1,824 yards, 16 interceptions, 12 touchdowns
4. Chuck Maloy, Holy Cross, 126 of 288 (43.8%), 1,514 yards, 16 interceptions, 13 touchdowns
5. John Borton, Ohio State, 115 of 196 (58.7%), 1,555 yards, 6 interceptions, 15 touchdowns
6. Jim Haluska, Wisconsin, 112 of 199 (56.3%), 1,410 yards, 18, 12 touchdowns
7. Roger Franz, Fordham, 105 of 216 (48.6%), 1,392 yards, 12 interceptions, 6 touchdowns
8. Dale Samuels, Purdue, 104 of 185 (56.2%), 1,131 yards, 6 interceptions, 10 touchdowns
9. Ted Marchibroda, Detroit, 103 of 240 (42.9%), 1,637 yards, 13 interceptions, 9 touchdowns
10. Dick Shinaut, Texas Western, 100 of 170 (58.8%), 1,559 yards, 8 interceptions, 12 touchdowns

==== Rushing ====
The following players were the individual leaders in rushing yards among major college football players during the 1952 season:
1. Howard Waugh, Tulsa, 1,372 yards on 164 carries (8.37 average)
2. Billy Vessels, Oklahoma, 1,072 yards on 161 carries (6.66 average)
3. Buck McPhail, Oklahoma, 1,018 yards on 161 carries (6.32 average)
4. Bobby Marlow, Alabama, 950 yards on 176 carries (5.40 average)
5. Dick Clasby, Harvard, 950 yards on 205 carries (4.63 average)
6. Alan Ameche, Wisconsin, 946 yards on 205 carries (4.61 average)
7. Williams, Hardin-Simmons, 898 yards on 180 carries (4.99 average)
8. Gene Filipski, Villanova, 889 yards on 138 carries (6.44 average)
9. Dick Curran, Arizona State, 870 yards on 114 carries (7.63 average)
10. Johnny Olszewski, California, 845 yards on 160 carries (5.28 average)

==== Receiving ====
The following players were the individual leaders in receptions among major college football players during the 1952 season:
1. Ed Brown, Fordham, 57 receptions,774 yards, 6 touchdowns
2. Joe McClaran, Drake, 47 receptions, 666 yards, 6 touchdowns
3. Jack Carroll, Holy Cross, 46 receptions, 609 yards, 4 touchdowns
4. Rocky Ryan, Illinois, 45 receptions, 714 yards, 5 touchdowns
5. Rex Smith, Illinois, 45 receptions, 642 yards, 4 touchdowns
6. Al Ward, Columbia, 43 receptions, 615 yards, 3 touchdowns
7. Bernie Flowers, Purdue, 43 receptions, 603 yards, 7 touchdowns
8. Black, Washington, 42 receptions, 637 yards, 7 touchdowns
9. Monte Brethauer, Oregon, 41 receptions, 486 yards, 2 touchdowns
10. Jim Byron, VMI, 40 receptions, 755 yards, 8 touchdowns

==== Scoring ====
The following players were the individual leaders in scoring among major college football players during the 1952 season:
1. Jackie Parker, Mississippi State, 120 points (16 TD, 24 PAT)
2. Billy Vessels, Oklahoma, 108 points (18 TD)
3. Bob Haner, Villanova, 99 points
4. Buford Long, Florida, 84 points (14 TD)

=== Team ===
==== Total offense ====
The following teams were the leaders in total offense in major college football during the 1952 season:
1. Tulsa, 466.6 yards per game
2. San Jose State, 430.1 yards per game
3. Michigan State, 428.7 yards per game
4. Princeton, 428.0 yards per game
5. Oklahoma, 425.5 yards per game
6. Wisconsin, 388.6 yards per game
7. Cincinnati, 388.2 yards per game
8. Texas, 386.5 yards per game
9. Ole Miss, 383.1 yards per game
10. West Virginia, 377.2 yards per game
10. Maryland, 377.2 yards per game

==== Total defense ====
The following teams were the leaders in total defense in major college football during the 1952 season:
1. Tennessee, 166.7 yards per game
2. Georgia Tech, 173.2 yards per game
3. USC, 177.5 yards per game
4. Virginia, 196.3 yards per game
5. Maryland, 200.9 yards per game
6. Navy, 209.3 yards per game
7. West Virginia, 211.2 yards per game
8. Duke, 212.1 yards per game
9. Wake Forest, 214.2 yards per game
10. Houston, 215.0 yards per game

== See also ==
- 1952 College Football All-America Team
