= 1952 Tampa Spartans football team =

American college football season

1952 Tampa Spartans football

Cigar Bowl champion

Cigar Bowl, W 21–12 vs. Lenoir–Rhyne
- Conference: Independent
- Record: 8–3–1
- Head coach: Marcelino Huerta (1st season)
- Home stadium: Phillips Field

1952 Southern college football independents records
| | Conf. | | | Overall |
| Team | W | L | T | W | | L | | T |
|---|---|---|---|---|---|---|---|---|
| Maryland State | | – | | 9 | – | 1 | – | 0 |
| Mississippi Southern | | – | | 10 | – | 2 | – | 0 |
| Virginia | | – | | 8 | – | 2 | – | 0 |
| Sewanee | | – | | 7 | – | 2 | – | 0 |
| No. 17 Navy | | – | | 6 | – | 2 | – | 1 |
| Arkansas State | | – | | 8 | – | 3 | – | 0 |
| Tampa | | – | | 8 | – | 3 | – | 1 |
| Chattanooga | | – | | 7 | – | 3 | – | 0 |
| Northeast Louisiana State | | – | | 5 | – | 4 | – | 0 |
| Delaware | | – | | 4 | – | 4 | – | 0 |
| Louisville | | – | | 3 | – | 5 | – | 0 |
| Miami (FL) | | – | | 4 | – | 7 | – | 0 |
| Marshall | | – | | 2 | – | 7 | – | 2 |
| Memphis State | | – | | 2 | – | 7 | – | 0 |
| Florida State | | – | | 1 | – | 8 | – | 1 |
Rankings from AP Poll

The 1952 Tampa Spartans football team represented the University of Tampa in the 1952 college football season. It was the Spartans' 16th season. The team was led by head coach Marcelino Huerta, in his first year, and played their home games at Phillips Field in Tampa, Florida. They finished with a record of eight wins, three losses and one tie (8–3–1) and with a victory in the Cigar Bowl over Lenoir–Rhyne.

After the resignation of Frank Sinkwich, on March 5, 1952, Marcelino Huerta was introduced as the Spartans' new head coach. Huerta had previously served as a line coach under Sinkwich for the 1950 and 1951 seasons after he graduated from the University of Florida.

== Schedule ==
| Date | Opponent | Site | Result | Attendance | Source |
|---|---|---|---|---|---|
| September 20 | at Troy State | Memorial Stadium; Columbus, GA | W 7–0 | 6,000 | |
| September 27 | South Georgia | Phillips Field; Tampa, FL | W 66–6 | | |
| October 4 | Mississippi Southern | Phillips Field; Tampa, FL | L 25–52 | | |
| October 11 | at Jacksonville State | College Bowl; Jacksonville, AL | W 20–6 | 6,000 | |
| October 18 | Stetson | Phillips Field; Tampa, FL | T 6–6 | | |
| October 24 | McNeese State | Phillips Field; Tampa, FL | L 20–42 | | |
| October 31 | Livingston State | Phillips Field; Tampa, FL | W 27–12 | 5,500 | |
| November 8 | Appalachian State | Phillips Field; Tampa, FL | W 19–0 | 7,500 | |
| November 15 | Chattanooga | Phillips Field; Tampa, FL | L 7–30 | 10,000 | |
| November 21 | Catawba | Phillips Field; Tampa, FL | W 20–6 | 4,000 | |
| December 6 | at Florida State | Doak Campbell Stadium; Tallahassee, FL | W 39–6 | | |
| December 13 | Lenoir–Rhyne | Phillips Field; Tampa, FL (Cigar Bowl) | W 21–12 | | |
