= 1952 Southwest Texas State Bobcats football team =

American college football season

1952 Southwest Texas State Bobcats football
- Conference: Lone Star Conference
- Record: 7–2 (4–1 LSC)
- Head coach: Milton Jowers (2nd season)
- Home stadium: Evans Field

1952 Lone Star Conference football standings
	Conf.					Overall
Team	W		L		T	W		L		T
East Texas State $	5	–	0	–	0	11	–	0	–	0
Southwest Texas State	4	–	1	–	0	7	–	2	–	0
Sam Houston State	2	–	3	–	0	6	–	4	–	0
Sul Ross	2	–	3	–	0	4	–	6	–	0
Lamar Tech	1	–	4	–	0	2	–	7	–	0
Stephen F. Austin	1	–	4	–	0	2	–	7	–	0
$ – Conference champion

The 1952 Southwest Texas State Bobcats football team was an American football team that represented Southwest Texas State Teachers College (now known as Texas State University) during the 1952 college football season as a member of the Lone Star Conference (LSC). In their second year under head coach Milton Jowers, the team compiled an overall record of 7–2 with a mark of 4–1 in conference play.

== Schedule ==
Date	Opponent	Site	Result	Attendance	Source
September 13	Abilene Christian*	Evans Field; San Marcos, TX	L 7–20		
September 20	at Trinity (TX)*	Alamo Stadium; San Antonio, TX	W 12–7		
September 27	at Texas A&I*	Javelina Stadium; Kingsville, TX	W 41–12		
October 11	Sul Ross	Evans Field; San Marcos, TX	W 31–25		
October 18	Stephen F. Austin	Evans Field; San Marcos, TX	W 20–10		
October 25	at Howard Payne*	Brownwood H.S. Stadium; Brownwood, TX	W 55–0		
November 1	Lamar Tech	Evans Field; San Marcos, TX	W 33–26		
November 8	at Sam Houston State	Pritchett Field; Huntsville, TX (rivalry)	W 35–27		
November 15	at East Texas State	Memorial Stadium; Commerce, TX	L 23–63	10,000	
*Non-conference game
