= 1952 Marquette Hilltoppers football team =

American college football season

1952 Marquette Hilltoppers football
- Conference: Independent
- Record: 3–5–1
- Head coach: Lisle Blackbourn (3rd season)
- Home stadium: Marquette Stadium

1952 Midwestern college football independents records
	Conf.			Overall
Team	W	L	T	W		L		T
No. 1 Michigan State		–		9	–	0	–	0
Michigan Tech		–		6	–	1	–	0
No. 3 Notre Dame		–		7	–	2	–	1
Carthage		–		5	–	2	–	0
Youngstown		–		4	–	3	–	1
Wabash		–		5	–	4	–	0
Dayton		–		6	–	5	–	0
Baldwin–Wallace		–		4	–	4	–	0
Wayne		–		4	–	4	–	0
Bradley		–		4	–	5	–	0
John Carroll		–		4	–	5	–	0
Washington University		–		4	–	5	–	0
Rose Poly		–		3	–	4	–	1
Xavier		–		4	–	6	–	0
Marquette		–		3	–	5	–	1
Drake		–		2	–	7	–	0
Rankings from AP Poll

The 1952 Marquette Hilltoppers football team was an American football team that represented Marquette University as an independent during the 1952 college football season. In its third season under head coach Lisle Blackbourn, the team compiled a 3–5–1 record and outscored opponents by a total of 214 to 181. The team played its home games at Marquette Stadium in Milwaukee.

The November 29 game against College of the Pacific in Stockton, California, was seen by just 7,304 fans — smallest in the history of the new stadium there.

== Schedule ==
Date	Opponent	Site	Result	Attendance	Source
September 27	at No. 7 Wisconsin	Camp Randall Stadium; Madison, WI	L 19–42	51,303	
October 4	Boston University	Marquette Stadium; Milwaukee, WI	W 21–0	14,000	
October 11	at Detroit	University of Detroit Stadium; Detroit, MI	W 37–27	12,289	
October 18	Arizona	Marquette Stadium; Milwaukee, WI	W 37–7	13,000	
October 24	at Miami (FL)	Burdine Stadium; Miami, FL	L 6–20	22,293	
November 1	Holy Cross	Marquette Stadium; Milwaukee, WI	L 0–7	20,050	
November 8	Miami (OH)	Marquette Stadium; Milwaukee, WI	L 21–22		
November 22	at No. 1 Michigan State	Macklin Stadium; East Lansing, MI	L 13–62	35,845	
November 29	at Pacific (CA)	Pacific Memorial Stadium; Stockton, CA	T 27–27	7,304	
Rankings from AP Poll released prior to the game
