= 1952 Marshall Thundering Herd football team =

American college football season

1952 Marshall Thundering Herd football
- Conference: Independent
- Record: 2–7–2
- Head coach: Pete Pederson (2nd season)
- Captain: Floyd Davis
- Home stadium: Fairfield Stadium

1952 Southern college football independents records
	Conf.			Overall
Team	W	L	T	W		L		T
Maryland State		–		9	–	1	–	0
Mississippi Southern		–		10	–	2	–	0
Virginia		–		8	–	2	–	0
Sewanee		–		7	–	2	–	0
No. 17 Navy		–		6	–	2	–	1
Arkansas State		–		8	–	3	–	0
Tampa		–		8	–	3	–	1
Chattanooga		–		7	–	3	–	0
Northeast Louisiana State		–		5	–	4	–	0
Delaware		–		4	–	4	–	0
Louisville		–		3	–	5	–	0
Miami (FL)		–		4	–	7	–	0
Marshall		–		2	–	7	–	2
Memphis State		–		2	–	7	–	0
Florida State		–		1	–	8	–	1
Rankings from AP Poll

The 1952 Marshall Thundering Herd football team was an American football team that represented Marshall University as an independent during the 1952 college football season. In its second season under head coach Pete Pederson, the team compiled a 2–7–2 record and was outscored by a total of 233 to 193. The team played its home games at Fairfield Stadium in Huntington, West Virginia.

== Schedule ==
Date	Time	Opponent	Site	Result	Source
September 13	8:00 p.m.	vs. VPI	Bluefield Municipal Stadium; Bluefield, WV	L 14–19	
September 20		Morehead State	Fairfield Stadium; Huntington, WV	W 48–14	
September 27		Eastern Kentucky	Fairfield Stadium; Huntington, WV	L 19–26	
October 4		John Carroll	Fairfield Stadium; Huntington, WV	W 16–7	
October 11		Morris Harvey	Fairfield Stadium; Huntington, WV	L 13–14	
October 18		at Youngstown	Rayen Stadium; Youngstown, OH	T 6–6	
October 25		Kent State^{†}	Fairfield Stadium; Huntington, WV	L 14–26	
November 1		Tennessee Tech	Fairfield Stadium; Huntington, WV	L 7–28	
November 8		at Dayton	UD Stadium; Dayton, OH	L 14–31	
November 15		at Wofford	Snyder Field; Spartanburg, SC	L 21–41	
November 22		at Ohio	Peden Stadium; Athens, OH	T 21–21	
^{†}Homecoming; All times are in Eastern time
