= 1952 Virginia Cavaliers football team =

American college football season

1952 Virginia Cavaliers football
- Conference: Independent
- Record: 8–2
- Head coach: Art Guepe (7th season)
- Captain: William Chisholm
- Home stadium: Scott Stadium

1952 Southern college football independents records
	Conf.			Overall
Team	W	L	T	W		L		T
Maryland State		–		9	–	1	–	0
Mississippi Southern		–		10	–	2	–	0
Virginia		–		8	–	2	–	0
Sewanee		–		7	–	2	–	0
No. 17 Navy		–		6	–	2	–	1
Arkansas State		–		8	–	3	–	0
Tampa		–		8	–	3	–	1
Chattanooga		–		7	–	3	–	0
Northeast Louisiana State		–		5	–	4	–	0
Delaware		–		4	–	4	–	0
Louisville		–		3	–	5	–	0
Miami (FL)		–		4	–	7	–	0
Marshall		–		2	–	7	–	2
Memphis State		–		2	–	7	–	0
Florida State		–		1	–	8	–	1
Rankings from AP Poll

The 1952 Virginia Cavaliers football team represented the University of Virginia during the 1952 college football season. The Cavaliers were led by seventh-year head coach Art Guepe and played their home games at Scott Stadium in Charlottesville, Virginia. They finished with 8 wins for the third consecutive year, but were not invited to a bowl game. After the season, Guepe left Virginia to accept the head coaching position at Vanderbilt. He had a record of 47–17–2 at Virginia, and his winning percentage of .727 remains the highest among Virginia head coaches who coached more than one year.

== Schedule ==
Date	Opponent	Rank	Site	Result	Attendance	Source
September 27	Vanderbilt		Scott Stadium; Charlottesville, VA	W 27–0	22,000	
October 4	vs. VPI	No. 16	Victory Stadium; Roanoke, VA (rivalry)	W 42–0	15,000	
October 11	George Washington	No. 15	Scott Stadium; Charlottesville, VA	W 50–0	18,000	
October 18	vs. VMI	No. 11	City Stadium; Richmond, VA (Tobacco Bowl)	W 33–14	23,000	
October 25	No. 6 Duke^{†}	No. 9	Scott Stadium; Charlottesville, VA	L 7–21	34,000–35,000	
November 1	vs. South Carolina	No. 16	Foreman Field; Norfolk, VA (Oyster Bowl)	L 14–21	21,000	
November 8	at North Carolina		Kenan Memorial Stadium; Chapel Hill, NC (South's Oldest Rivalry)	W 34–7	25,000	
November 15	Richmond		Scott Stadium; Charlottesville, VA	W 49–0	6,000	
November 22	Washington and Lee		Scott Stadium; Charlottesville, VA	W 21–14	14,000	
November 29	at William & Mary	No. 20	Cary Field; Williamsburg, VA	W 20–13	15,000	
^{†}Homecoming; Rankings from AP Poll released prior to the game
