= 1952 Grambling Tigers football team =

American college football season

1952 Grambling Tigers football
- Conference: Midwest Athletic Association
- Record: 7–3–1 (1–1–1 MWAA)
- Head coach: Eddie Robinson (10th season)
- Home stadium: Tiger Stadium

1952 Midwest Athletic Association football standings
| | Conf. | | | | | Overall |
| Team | W | | L | | T | W | | L | | T |
|---|---|---|---|---|---|---|---|---|---|---|
| No. 2 Lincoln (MO) + | 4 | – | 0 | – | 1 | 8 | – | 0 | – | 1 |
| No. 3 Texas Southern + | 2 | – | 0 | – | 1 | 10 | – | 0 | – | 1 |
| No. 6 Tennessee A&I | 2 | – | 1 | – | 0 | 8 | – | 2 | – | 0 |
| No. 12 Grambling | 1 | – | 1 | – | 1 | 7 | – | 3 | – | 1 |
| No. 14 Central State (OH) | 1 | – | 2 | – | 0 | 4 | – | 4 | – | 0 |
| Jackson | 0 | – | 2 | – | 1 | 3 | – | 5 | – | 1 |
| No. 23 Kentucky State | 0 | – | 4 | – | 0 | 4 | – | 6 | – | 1 |
+ – Conference co-champions; Rankings from Associated Negro Press

The 1952 Grambling Tigers football team represented Grambling College (now known as Grambling State University) as a member of the Midwest Athletic Association (MWAA) during the 1952 college football season. Led by 10th-year head coach Eddie Robinson, the Tigers compiled an overall record of 7–3–1 and a mark of 1–1–1 in conference play.

== Schedule ==
| Date | Opponent | Site | Result | Source |
|---|---|---|---|---|
| September 19 | at Paul Quinn* | Katy Park; Waco, TX | W 13–0 | |
| September 27 | at Maryland State* | Princess Anne, MD | L 0–32 | |
| October 4 | Kentucky State | Tiger Stadium; Grambling, LA | W 14–13 | |
| October 11 | at Texas Southern | Public School Stadium; Houston, TX | L 14–46 | |
| October 20 | vs. Wiley* | State Fair Stadium; Shreveport, LA | W 18–14 | |
| October 26 | Mississippi Industrial* | Tiger Stadium; Grambling, LA | W 26–0 | |
| November 1 | Jackson | Tiger Stadium; Grambling, LA | T 13–13 | |
| November 8 | Leland* | Tiger Stadium; Grambling, LA | W 34–7 | |
| November 15 | Prairie View A&M* | Tiger Stadium; Grambling, LA | L 14–27 | |
| November 22 | at Arkansas AM&N* | Pine Bluff, AR | W 35–19 | |
| December 2 | vs. Alcorn A&M* | Neville Stadium; Monroe, LA | W 27–13 | |
*Non-conference game
