= 1952 Lamar Tech Cardinals football team =

American college football season

1952 Lamar Tech Cardinals football
- Conference: Lone Star Conference
- Record: 2–7 (1–4 LSC)
- Head coach: Stan Lambert (2nd season)
- Home stadium: Greenie Stadium

1952 Lone Star Conference football standings
	Conf.					Overall
Team	W		L		T	W		L		T
East Texas State $	5	–	0	–	0	11	–	0	–	0
Southwest Texas State	4	–	1	–	0	7	–	2	–	0
Sam Houston State	2	–	3	–	0	6	–	4	–	0
Sul Ross	2	–	3	–	0	4	–	6	–	0
Lamar Tech	1	–	4	–	0	2	–	7	–	0
Stephen F. Austin	1	–	4	–	0	2	–	7	–	0
$ – Conference champion

The 1952 Lamar Tech Cardinals football team was an American football team that represented Lamar State College of Technology (now known as Lamar University) during the 1952 college football season as a member of the Lone Star Conference. In their second year under head coach Stan Lambert, the team compiled a 2–7 record.

== Schedule ==
Date	Opponent	Site	Result	Attendance	Source
September 20	at Southwestern Louisiana*	McNaspy Stadium; Lafayette, LA (rivalry)	L 13–14		
September 27	Northwestern State*	Greenie Stadium; Beaumont, TX	W 35–13	6,000	
October 4	at Stephen F. Austin	Memorial Stadium; Nacogdoches, TX	W 27–6		
October 11	East Texas State	Greenie Stadium; Beaumont, TX	L 0–48		
October 18	Sam Houston State	Greenie Stadium; Beaumont, TX	L 13–31		
October 25	at Trinity (TX)*	Alamo Stadium; San Antonio, TX	L 7–66		
November 1	at Southwest Texas State	Evans Field; San Marcos, TX	L 26–33		
November 8	McNeese State*	Greenie Stadium; Beaumont, TX (rivalry)	L 7–42		
November 15	at Sul Ross	Jackson Field; Alpine, TX	L 19–27		
*Non-conference game
