= 1952 Delaware State Hornets football team =

American college football season

1952 Delaware State Hornets football
- Conference: Central Intercollegiate Athletic Association
- Record: 1–7 (1–5 CIAA)
- Head coach: Willard S. Jones (2nd season)

1952 Central Intercollegiate Athletic Association football standings
| | Conf. | | | | | Overall |
| Team | W | | L | | T | W | | L | | T |
|---|---|---|---|---|---|---|---|---|---|---|
| No. 4 Virginia State $ | 7 | – | 0 | – | 0 | 8 | – | 1 | – | 0 |
| No. 11 North Carolina A&T | 5 | – | 2 | – | 0 | 6 | – | 4 | – | 0 |
| St. Augustine's | 5 | – | 2 | – | 0 | 7 | – | 2 | – | 0 |
| No. 19 North Carolina College | 4 | – | 2 | – | 0 | 4 | – | 4 | – | 0 |
| No. 20 Morgan State | 4 | – | 2 | – | 0 | 4 | – | 4 | – | 1 |
| Johnson C. Smith | 4 | – | 2 | – | 0 | 5 | – | 2 | – | 0 |
| No. 17 Howard | 5 | – | 2 | – | 1 | 6 | – | 2 | – | 1 |
| West Virginia State | 5 | – | 3 | – | 0 | 6 | – | 4 | – | 0 |
| No. 21 Hampton | 4 | – | 4 | – | 0 | 4 | – | 5 | – | 0 |
| Lincoln (PA) | 2 | – | 3 | – | 1 | 5 | – | 3 | – | 1 |
| Winston-Salem State | 2 | – | 4 | – | 0 | 4 | – | 4 | – | 0 |
| Delaware State | 1 | – | 5 | – | 0 | 1 | – | 7 | – | 0 |
| Bluefield State | 1 | – | 5 | – | 0 | 1 | – | 7 | – | 0 |
| Virginia Union | 1 | – | 6 | – | 0 | 1 | – | 8 | – | 0 |
| Saint Paul's (VA) | 0 | – | 6 | – | 0 | 0 | – | 8 | – | 0 |
$ – Conference champion; Rankings from Associated Negro Press

The 1952 Delaware State Hornets football team represented Delaware State College—now known as Delaware State University—as a member of the Central Intercollegiate Athletic Association (CIAA) in the 1952 college football season. Led by coach Willard S. Jones in his second year, the Hornets compiled a 1–7 record, being shut out three times and outscored 48 to 205.

== Schedule ==
| Date | Time | Opponent | Site | Result | Source |
|---|---|---|---|---|---|
| September 27 | 8:15 p.m. | at King's (PA)* | Wilkes-Barre Memorial Stadium; Wilkes-Barre, PA | L 6–33 | |
| October 4 | | Morgan State | Dover, DE | L 6–33 | |
| October 10 | | at Maryland State* | Princess Anne, MD | L 0–60 | |
| October 18 | | Johnson C. Smith | Dover, DE | L 0–21 | |
| October 25 | | at Lincoln (PA) | Lincoln, PA | L 6–26 | |
| November 1 | | Saint Paul's (VA) | Dover, DE | W 24–0 | |
| November 15 | | Howard | Dover, DE | L 0–25 | |
| November 22 | | at St. Augustine's | Raleigh, NC | L 6–7 | |
*Non-conference game
