= 1952 Florida State Seminoles football team =

American college football season

1952 Florida State Seminoles football
- Conference: Independent
- Record: 1–8–1
- Head coach: Don Veller (5th season)
- Captains: Curt Campbell; Vic Szczepanik
- Home stadium: Doak Campbell Stadium

1952 Southern college football independents records
	Conf.			Overall
Team	W	L	T	W		L		T
Maryland State		–		9	–	1	–	0
Mississippi Southern		–		10	–	2	–	0
Virginia		–		8	–	2	–	0
Sewanee		–		7	–	2	–	0
No. 17 Navy		–		6	–	2	–	1
Arkansas State		–		8	–	3	–	0
Tampa		–		8	–	3	–	1
Chattanooga		–		7	–	3	–	0
Northeast Louisiana State		–		5	–	4	–	0
Delaware		–		4	–	4	–	0
Louisville		–		3	–	5	–	0
Miami (FL)		–		4	–	7	–	0
Marshall		–		2	–	7	–	2
Memphis State		–		2	–	7	–	0
Florida State		–		1	–	8	–	1
Rankings from AP Poll

The 1952 Florida State Seminoles football team represented Florida State University as an independent during the 1952 college football season. Led by Don Veller in his fifth and final season as head coach, the Seminoles compiled a record of 1–8–1.

== Schedule ==
Date	Opponent	Site	Result	Attendance	Source
September 27	Louisiana Tech	Doak Campbell Stadium; Tallahassee, FL	L 13–32	7,843	
October 4	Louisville	Doak Campbell Stadium; Tallahassee, FL	L 14–41		
October 10	VMI	Doak Campbell Stadium; Tallahassee, FL	L 7–28	6,227	
October 25	at NC State	Riddick Stadium; Raleigh, NC	L 7–13	6,000	
November 1	vs. Stetson	Tangerine Bowl; Orlando, FL	T 6–6		
November 8	Mississippi Southern	Doak Campbell Stadium; Tallahassee, FL	L 21–50	5,020	
November 15	Furman^{†}	Doak Campbell Stadium; Tallahassee, FL	L 0–9	8,096	
November 22	at No. 2 Georgia Tech	Grant Field; Atlanta, GA	L 0–30	25,000	
November 29	at Wofford	Synder Field; Spartanburg, SC	W 27–13		
December 6	Tampa	Doak Campbell Stadium; Tallahassee, FL	L 6–39		
^{†}Homecoming; Rankings from AP Poll released prior to the game
