= 1952 Tennessee A&I Tigers football team =

American college football season

1952 Tennessee A&I Tigers football
- Conference: Midwest Athletic Association
- Record: 8–2 (2–1 MWAA)
- Head coach: Henry Kean (9th season)
- Home stadium: University Stadium

1952 Midwest Athletic Association football standings
	Conf.					Overall
Team	W		L		T	W		L		T
No. 2 Lincoln (MO) +	4	–	0	–	1	8	–	0	–	1
No. 3 Texas Southern +	2	–	0	–	1	10	–	0	–	1
No. 6 Tennessee A&I	2	–	1	–	0	8	–	2	–	0
No. 12 Grambling	1	–	1	–	1	7	–	3	–	1
No. 14 Central State (OH)	1	–	2	–	0	4	–	4	–	0
Jackson	0	–	2	–	1	3	–	5	–	1
No. 23 Kentucky State	0	–	4	–	0	4	–	6	–	1
+ – Conference co-champions; Rankings from Associated Negro Press

The 1952 Tennessee A&I Tigers football team was an American football team that represented Tennessee Agricultural & Industrial State College as a member of the Midwest Athletic Association (MWAA) during the 1952 college football season. In their ninth season under head coach Henry Kean, the Tigers compiled an 8–2 record and outscored opponents by a total of 255 to 77. The Dickinson System rated Tennessee A&I as the No. 4 black college football team for 1952 with a score of 24.43, behind only Florida A&M (25.57), Virginia State (24.57), and Lincoln of Missouri (24.51). The team played its home games in Nashville, Tennessee.

== Schedule ==
Date	Opponent	Site	Result	Attendance	Source
September 19	vs. Lincoln (MO)	Melrose Stadium; Memphis, TN	L 12–20		
September 27	at Virginia State*	Rogers Stadium; Ettrick, VA	L 0–6	4,000	
October 3	Langston*	Nashville, TN	W 34–0		
October 11	at Allen*	Columbia, SC	W 41–6		
October 17	West Virginia State*	University Stadium; Nashville, TN	W 22–7	4,000	
October 24	Central State (OH)	Nashville, TN	W 35–0		
October 31	North Carolina College*	University Stadium; Nashville, TN	W 28–26		
November 15	at Morris Brown*	Atlanta, GA	W 26–0	5,000	
November 22	at Kentucky State	Frankfort, KY	W 13–0		
November 27	Virginia Union*	Nashville, TN	W 44–12		
*Non-conference game
