= 1952 Southern Jaguars football team =

American college football season

1952 Southern Jaguars football
- Conference: Southwestern Athletic Conference
- Record: 9–2 (5–1 SWAC)
- Head coach: Ace Mumford (17th season)
- Home stadium: University Stadium; Memorial Stadium

1952 Southwestern Athletic Conference football standings
	Conf.					Overall
Team	W		L		T	W		L		T
No. 5 Prairie View A&M $	6	–	0	–	0	7	–	2	–	0
No. 10 Southern	5	–	1	–	0	9	–	2	–	0
No. 13 Texas College	3	–	2	–	1	4	–	3	–	1
Arkansas AM&N	2	–	2	–	2	3	–	6	–	2
Wiley	2	–	4	–	0	4	–	5	–	0
Langston	1	–	4	–	1	2	–	6	–	1
Bishop	0	–	6	–	0	2	–	8	–	0
$ – Conference champion; Rankings from Associated Negro Press

The 1952 Southern Jaguars football team was an American football team that represented Southern University as a member of the Southwestern Athletic Conference (SWAC) during the 1952 college football season. Led by Ace Mumford in his 17th season as head coach, the Jaguars compiled an overall record of 9–2, with a mark of 5–1 in conference play, and finished second in the SWAC.

== Schedule ==
Date	Opponent	Site	Result	Attendance	Source
September 27	at Texas Southern*	Public School Stadium; Houston, TX	L 7–14	3,700	
October 3	vs. Alcorn A&M*	Mississippi Veterans Memorial Stadium; Jackson, MS	W 27–6		
October 11	Paul Quinn*	University Stadium; Baton Rouge, LA	W 51–6		
October 18	at Arkansas AM&N	Pumphrey Stadium; Pine Bluff, AR	W 19–7		
October 25	Langston	University Stadium; Baton Rouge, LA	W 38–7		
November 1	at Texas College	Steer Stadium; Tyler, TX	W 19–16		
November 8	Bishop	University Stadium; Baton Rouge, LA	W 105–0		
November 15	Wiley^{†}	University Stadium; Baton Rouge, LA	W 38–20		
November 22	Florida A&M*	Memorial Stadium; Baton Rouge, LA	W 25–13	10,000	
November 29	at Prairie View A&M	Blackshear Field; Prairie View, TX	L 6–31	5,000	
December 6	Xavier (LA)*	University Stadium; Baton Rouge, LA	W 19–13		
*Non-conference game; ^{†}Homecoming; Source:
