= 1952 Michigan State Spartans football team =

American college football season

1952 Michigan State Spartans football

Consensus national champion
- Conference: Independent

Ranking
- Coaches: No. 1
- AP: No. 1
- Record: 9–0
- Head coach: Biggie Munn (6th season)
- MVP: Dick Tamburo
- Captain: Donald McAuliffe
- Home stadium: Macklin Stadium

1952 Midwestern college football independents records
| | Conf. | | | Overall |
| Team | W | L | T | W | | L | | T |
|---|---|---|---|---|---|---|---|---|
| No. 1 Michigan State | | – | | 9 | – | 0 | – | 0 |
| Michigan Tech | | – | | 6 | – | 1 | – | 0 |
| No. 3 Notre Dame | | – | | 7 | – | 2 | – | 1 |
| Carthage | | – | | 5 | – | 2 | – | 0 |
| Youngstown | | – | | 4 | – | 3 | – | 1 |
| Wabash | | – | | 5 | – | 4 | – | 0 |
| Dayton | | – | | 6 | – | 5 | – | 0 |
| Baldwin–Wallace | | – | | 4 | – | 4 | – | 0 |
| Wayne | | – | | 4 | – | 4 | – | 0 |
| Bradley | | – | | 4 | – | 5 | – | 0 |
| John Carroll | | – | | 4 | – | 5 | – | 0 |
| Washington University | | – | | 4 | – | 5 | – | 0 |
| Rose Poly | | – | | 3 | – | 4 | – | 1 |
| Xavier | | – | | 4 | – | 6 | – | 0 |
| Marquette | | – | | 3 | – | 5 | – | 1 |
| Drake | | – | | 2 | – | 7 | – | 0 |
Rankings from AP Poll

The 1952 Michigan State Spartans football team was an American football team that represented Michigan State College as an independent during the 1952 college football season. In their sixth year under head coach Biggie Munn, the Spartans recorded a perfect 9–0 record, outscored opponents by a total of 312 to 84, and were recognized as the 1952 national champion. The season was part of a 28-game winning streak that began in October 1950 and continued until October 1953.

In the final AP Poll released on December 1, 1952, Michigan State was ranked No. 1 with 2,683 points, more than 400 points ahead of No. 2 Georgia Tech. The Spartans also finished with the No. 1 ranking in the final UPI coaches poll. The team was also recognized as the 1952 national champion in later analyses issued by the Boand System, DeVold System, Dunkel System, College Football Researchers Association, Helms Athletic Foundation, Litkenhous, National Championship Foundation, Sagarin Ratings, and Williamson System. It was Michigan State's first consensus national championship. Five other selectors chose Georgia Tech as national champion. It was also Michigan State's last year as a football independent, as the Spartans became a football member of the Big Ten Conference in 1953.

Four Michigan State players were recognized on the 1952 All-America college football team: back Don McAuliffe (first-team honors from the United Press, All-America Board, and Collier's); center Dick Tamburo (first-team honors from the Associated Press, Central Press Association, and International News Service); guard Frank Kush (first-team honors from the Associated Press); and end Ed Luke (second-team honors from the Associated Press).

The team's statistical leaders included quarterback Tom Yewcic with 941 passing yards, halfback Billy Wells with 585 rushing yards, end Ellis Duckett with 323 receiving yards, and halfbacks Don McAuliffe and Leroy Bolden with 54 points each.

== Schedule ==
| Date | Opponent | Rank | Site | Result | Attendance | Source |
|---|---|---|---|---|---|---|
| September 27 | at Michigan | No. 1 | Michigan Stadium; Ann Arbor, MI (rivalry) | W 27–13 | 97,239 | |
| October 4 | at Oregon State | No. 1 | Multnomah Stadium; Portland, OR | W 17–14 | 22,595 | |
| October 11 | Texas A&M | No. 2 | Macklin Stadium; East Lansing, MI | W 48–6 | 49,123 | |
| October 18 | Syracuse | No. 1 | Macklin Stadium; East Lansing, MI | W 48–7 | 38,254 | |
| October 25 | No. 17 Penn State^{†} | No. 1 | Macklin Stadium; East Lansing, MI (rivalry) | W 34–7 | 51,162 | |
| November 1 | at No. 8 Purdue | No. 1 | Ross–Ade Stadium; West Lafayette, IN | W 14–7 | 49,500 | |
| November 8 | at Indiana | No. 1 | Memorial Stadium; Bloomington, IN (rivalry) | W 41–14 | 22,000 | |
| November 15 | No. 6 Notre Dame | No. 1 | Macklin Stadium; East Lansing, MI (rivalry) | W 21–3 | 52,472 | |
| November 22 | Marquette | No. 1 | Macklin Stadium; East Lansing, MI | W 62–13 | 35,845 | |
^{†}Homecoming; Rankings from AP Poll released prior to the game

== Personnel ==
=== Roster ===
"Defensive stalwarts Weaver, Tamburo, Kush, and Timmerman glow over their impressive record." (Opponent rushing totals displayed on chalkboard.)

Michigan State coaching staff: freshman coach Devine, end coach Edwards, line coach Daugherty (seated), backfield coach Steve Sebo, and head coach Munn

- Howard Adams, guard
- Wayne Benson, fullback
- Alex Bleahu, tackle
- Doug Bobo, end
- Leroy Bolden, halfback
- Leo Boyd, halfback
- Bob Breniff, guard
- Hank Bullough, guard
- Rex Corless, halfback
- Don Cutler, tackle
- Paul Dekker, end
- Don Dohoney, end
- Rollie Dotsch, guard/tackle
- Ellis Duckett, end
- Jim Ellis, safety
- Chuck Fairbanks
- Larry Fowler, tackle
- Al Fracassa, quarterback
- Chuck Frank, tackle
- Don Kauth, end
- Joe Klein, tackle
- Frank Kush, guard
- Gene Lekenta, fullback
- Ed Luke, end
- Don McAuliffe, halfback
- Jack Morgan, tackle
- Morley Murphy, tackle
- Jim Neal, center
- Dick Panin, fullback
- Vince Pisano, halfback
- Bill Quinlin, end
- Don Schiesswohl, guard
- Gordon Serr, guard
- Evan Slonac, fullback
- Dick Tamburo, center
- Willie Thrower, quarterback
- Ed Timmerman, fullback
- Ray Vogt, halfback
- Doug Weaver, center
- Billy Wells, halfback
- John Wilson, halfback
- Johnny Wilson, quarterback
- Tom Yewcic, quarterback
- Bert Zagers, halfback

=== Coaching staff ===
- Head coach: Biggie Munn
- Assistant coaches: Duffy Daugherty, Dan Devine, Earle Edwards, Dewey King, Steve Sebo

== 1953 NFL draft ==
| Player | Position | Round | Pick | NFL club |
|---|---|---|---|---|
| Paul Dekker | End | 3 | 27 | Washington Redskins |
| Dick Tamburo | Center | 4 | 47 | Cleveland Browns |
| Ed Timmerman | Back | 14 | 160 | Washington Redskins |
| Jim Ellis | Back | 25 | 299 | Cleveland Browns |
