= 1952 Prairie View A&M Panthers football team =

American college football season

1952 Prairie View A&M Panthers football

SWAC champion

Prairie View Bowl, L 12–13 vs. Texas Southern
- Conference: Southwestern Athletic Conference
- Record: 7–2 (6–0 SWAC)
- Head coach: Billy Nicks (4th season)
- Home stadium: Blackshear Field

1952 Southwestern Athletic Conference football standings
| | Conf. | | | | | Overall |
| Team | W | | L | | T | W | | L | | T |
|---|---|---|---|---|---|---|---|---|---|---|
| No. 5 Prairie View A&M $ | 6 | – | 0 | – | 0 | 7 | – | 2 | – | 0 |
| No. 10 Southern | 5 | – | 1 | – | 0 | 9 | – | 2 | – | 0 |
| No. 13 Texas College | 3 | – | 2 | – | 1 | 4 | – | 3 | – | 1 |
| Arkansas AM&N | 2 | – | 2 | – | 2 | 3 | – | 6 | – | 2 |
| Wiley | 2 | – | 4 | – | 0 | 4 | – | 5 | – | 0 |
| Langston | 1 | – | 4 | – | 1 | 2 | – | 6 | – | 1 |
| Bishop | 0 | – | 6 | – | 0 | 2 | – | 8 | – | 0 |
$ – Conference champion; Rankings from Associated Negro Press

The 1952 Prairie View A&M Panthers football team represented Prairie View A&M College of Texas (now known as Prairie View A&M University) as a member of the Southwestern Athletic Conference (SWAC) during the 1952 college football season. Led by fourth-year head coach Billy Nicks, the Panthers compiled an overall record of 7–2, with a conference record of 6–0, and finished as SWAC champion.

== Schedule ==
| Date | Opponent | Site | Result | Attendance | Source |
|---|---|---|---|---|---|
| October 4 | Bishop | Blackshear Field; Prairie View, TX | W 58–0 | | |
| October 13 | vs. Wiley | Cotton Bowl; Dallas, TX (State Fair Classic) | W 53–0 | 15,000 | |
| October 25 | at Florida A&M* | Bragg Stadium; Tallahassee, FL | L 7–10 | | |
| November 1 | Arkansas AM&N | Blackshear Field; Prairie View, TX | W 39–13 | 5,000 | |
| November 8 | Texas College | Blackshear Field; Prairie View, TX | W 44–12 | | |
| November 15 | at Grambling* | Tiger Stadium; Grambling, LA | W 27–14 | | |
| November 22 | at Langston | Anderson Field; Langston, OK | W 18–0 | | |
| November 29 | Southern | Blackshear Field; Prairie View, TX | W 31–6 | 5,000 | |
| January 1, 1953 | vs. Texas Southern* | Buffalo Stadium; Houston, TX (Prairie View Bowl) | L 12–13 | 13,000 | |
*Non-conference game
