= Dick Tamburo =

American football player (1930–2010)

Biographical details
- Born: February 6, 1930; New Kensington, Pennsylvania, U.S.
- Died: February 24, 2020 (aged 90); Phoenix, Arizona, U.S.

Playing career
- 1950–1952: Michigan State
- Position: Center

Coaching career (HC unless noted)
- 1958–1966: Arizona State (assistant)
- 1967–1970: Iowa (assistant)

Administrative career (AD unless noted)
- 1971–1972: Kent State (assistant AD)
- 1972–1978: Illinois (associate AD)
- 1978–1980: Texas Tech
- 1980–1985: Arizona State
- 1985–1986: Fresno State (associate AD)
- 1986–1988: Missouri (assistant AD)
- 1988–1992: Missouri

Accomplishments and honors

Championships
- National (1952)

Awards
- First-team All-American (1952)

Richard Pfeiffer Tamburo (February 6, 1930 – February 24, 2020) was an American college football player and coach and athletics administrator. A native of New Kensington, Pennsylvania, he played college football for the Michigan State Spartans football team and was selected by the Associated Press, the International News Service and the Central Press Association as a first-team player on the 1952 College Football All-America Team. He later went into coaching and intercollegiate athletic administration. He served as the athletic director at Texas Tech (1978–1980), Arizona State University (1980–1985), and the University of Missouri (1988–1992). Tamburo died in Phoenix on February 24, 2020, aged 90.
