= 1952 Maryland State Hawks football team =

American college football season

1952 Maryland State Hawks football
- Conference: Independent
- Record: 9–1
- Head coach: Vernon McCain (5th season)

1952 Southern college football independents records
	Conf.			Overall
Team	W	L	T	W		L		T
Maryland State		–		9	–	1	–	0
Mississippi Southern		–		10	–	2	–	0
Virginia		–		8	–	2	–	0
Sewanee		–		7	–	2	–	0
No. 17 Navy		–		6	–	2	–	1
Arkansas State		–		8	–	3	–	0
Tampa		–		8	–	3	–	1
Chattanooga		–		7	–	3	–	0
Northeast Louisiana State		–		5	–	4	–	0
Delaware		–		4	–	4	–	0
Louisville		–		3	–	5	–	0
Miami (FL)		–		4	–	7	–	0
Marshall		–		2	–	7	–	2
Memphis State		–		2	–	7	–	0
Florida State		–		1	–	8	–	1
Rankings from AP Poll

The 1952 Maryland State Hawks football team was an American football team that represented Maryland State College (now known as University of Maryland Eastern Shore) during the 1952 college football season. In their fifth season under head coach Vernon McCain, the team compiled a 9–1 record, shut out five of ten opponents, and outscored all opponents by a total of 257 to 52.

== Schedule ==
Date	Opponent	Site	Result	Attendance	Source
September 13	Naval Auxiliary Air Station Chincoteague	Princess Anne, MD	W 65–0		
September 20	Virginia Union	Princess Anne, MD	W 13–0		
September 27	Grambling	Princess Anne, MD	W 32–0		
October 3	at Morris Brown	Atlanta, GA	L 0–20		
October 10	Delaware State	Princess Anne, MD	W 60–0		
October 18	Hampton	Princess Anne, MD	W 20–0		
October 25	at North Carolina College	Durham, NC	W 20–13		
November 1	Central State (OH)	Princess Anne, MD	W 14–6		
November 14	at Bridgeport	Bridgeport, CT	W 21–6		
December 6	at North Carolina A&T	Greensboro NC	W 10–7		
