= 1952 Miami Hurricanes football team =

American college football season

1952 Miami Hurricanes football
- Conference: Independent
- Record: 4–7
- Head coach: Andy Gustafson (5th season)
- Home stadium: Burdine Stadium

1952 Southern college football independents records
	Conf.			Overall
Team	W	L	T	W		L		T
Maryland State		–		9	–	1	–	0
Mississippi Southern		–		10	–	2	–	0
Virginia		–		8	–	2	–	0
Sewanee		–		7	–	2	–	0
No. 17 Navy		–		6	–	2	–	1
Arkansas State		–		8	–	3	–	0
Tampa		–		8	–	3	–	1
Chattanooga		–		7	–	3	–	0
Northeast Louisiana State		–		5	–	4	–	0
Delaware		–		4	–	4	–	0
Louisville		–		3	–	5	–	0
Miami (FL)		–		4	–	7	–	0
Marshall		–		2	–	7	–	2
Memphis State		–		2	–	7	–	0
Florida State		–		1	–	8	–	1
Rankings from AP Poll

The 1952 Miami Hurricanes football team represented the University of Miami as an independent during the 1952 college football season. Led by fifth-year head coach Andy Gustafson, the Hurricanes played their home games at Burdine Stadium in Miami, Florida. Miami finished the season 4–7.

== Schedule ==
Date	Opponent	Site	Result	Attendance	Source
September 26	VMI	Burdine Stadium; Miami, FL	W 45–0	35,542	
October 3	Alabama	Burdine Stadium; Miami, FL	L 7–21	53,916	
October 10	at Boston University	Fenway Park; Boston, MA	L 7–9	14,522	
October 17	Richmond	Burdine Stadium; Miami, FL	W 41–6	24,255	
October 24	Marquette	Burdine Stadium; Miami, FL	W 20–6	22,293	
October 31	Kentucky	Burdine Stadium; Miami, FL	L 0–29	25,918	
November 7	Vanderbilt	Burdine Stadium; Miami, FL	L 0–9	32,906	
November 14	Stetson	Burdine Stadium; Miami, FL	W 35–0	11,846	
November 22	at Florida	Florida Field; Gainesville, FL (rivalry)	L 6–43	35,000	
November 28	North Carolina	Burdine Stadium; Miami, FL	L 7–34	20,000	
December 5	Georgia	Burdine Stadium; Miami, FL	L 13–35	21,557	
