= 1952 McNeese State Cowboys football team =

American college football season

1952 McNeese State Cowboys football
- Conference: Gulf States Conference
- Record: 7–3 (2–3 GSC)
- Head coach: Albert I. Ratcliff (7th season)
- Home stadium: Killen Field

1952 Gulf States Conference football standings
	Conf.					Overall
Team	W		L		T	W		L		T
Louisiana Tech +	3	–	0	–	2	6	–	1	–	2
Southeastern Louisiana +	3	–	0	–	2	6	–	1	–	2
Southwestern Louisiana +	3	–	0	–	2	5	–	2	–	2
McNeese State	2	–	3	–	0	7	–	3	–	0
Louisiana College	0	–	4	–	1	3	–	7	–	1
Northwestern State	0	–	4	–	1	1	–	7	–	1
+ – Conference co-champions

The 1952 McNeese State Cowboys football team was an American football team that represented McNeese State College (now known as McNeese State University) as a member of the Gulf States Conference (GSC) during the 1952 college football season. In their seventh year under head coach Albert I. Ratcliff, the team compiled an overall record of 7–3 with a mark of 2–3 in conference play, and finished fourth in the GSC.

== Schedule ==
Date	Opponent	Site	Result	Source
September 20	at Louisiana Tech	Tech Stadium; Ruston, LA	L 0–6	
September 27	Stephen F. Austin*	Killen Field; Lake Charles, LA	W 25–7	
October 4	at Northwestern State	Demon Stadium; Natchitoches, LA (rivalry)	W 32–12	
October 11	Northeast Louisiana State*	Killen Field; Lake Charles, LA	W 41–7	
October 18	Louisiana College	Killen Field; Lake Charles, LA	W 40–7	
October 24	at Tampa*	Phillips Field; Tampa, FL	W 42–20	
November 1	Sam Houston State*	Killen Field; Lake Charles, LA	W 35–26	
November 8	at Lamar Tech*	Greenie Stadium; Beaumont, TX (rivalry)	W 42–7	
November 15	at Southeastern Louisiana	Strawberry Stadium; Hammond, LA	L 0–13	
November 22	Southwestern Louisiana	Killen Field; Lake Charles, LA (rivalry)	L 13–20	
*Non-conference game
