= 1952 Washington University Bears football team =

American college football season

1952 Washington University Bears football
- Conference: Independent
- Record: 4–5
- Head coach: Irwin Uteritz (4th season)
- Home stadium: Francis Field

1952 Midwestern college football independents records
	Conf.			Overall
Team	W	L	T	W		L		T
No. 1 Michigan State		–		9	–	0	–	0
Michigan Tech		–		6	–	1	–	0
No. 3 Notre Dame		–		7	–	2	–	1
Carthage		–		5	–	2	–	0
Youngstown		–		4	–	3	–	1
Wabash		–		5	–	4	–	0
Dayton		–		6	–	5	–	0
Baldwin–Wallace		–		4	–	4	–	0
Wayne		–		4	–	4	–	0
Bradley		–		4	–	5	–	0
John Carroll		–		4	–	5	–	0
Washington University		–		4	–	5	–	0
Rose Poly		–		3	–	4	–	1
Xavier		–		4	–	6	–	0
Marquette		–		3	–	5	–	1
Drake		–		2	–	7	–	0
Rankings from AP Poll

The 1952 Washington University Bears football team represented Washington University in St. Louis as an independent during the 1952 college football season. Led by Irwin Uteritz in his fourth and final season as head coach, the Bears compiled a record of 4–5. Washington University played home games at Francis Field in St. Louis.

== Schedule ==
Date	Time	Opponent	Site	Result	Attendance	Source
September 27	2:00 p.m.	Missouri Mines	Francis Field; St. Louis, MO	W 27–6	6,500	
October 4		Wayne	Francis Field; St. Louis, MO	W 13–12		
October 11	1:00 p.m.	at Harvard	Harvard Stadium; Boston, MA	L 0–42	7,000	
October 18	2:00 p.m.	Western Reserve	Francis Field; St. Louis, MO	L 16–20	3,000	
October 25	2:00 p.m.	Western Michigan^{†}	Francis Field; St. Louis, MO	L 20–28	8,000	
November 1		at Southern Illinois	McAndrew Stadium; Carbondale, IL	W 19–14	5,500	
November 8		at Butler	Butler Bowl; Indianapolis, IN	L 20–33	1,000	
November 15	2:00 p.m.	Illinois Wesleyan	Francis Field; St. Louis, MO	W 61–14	3,000	
November 22		at Sewanee	Hardee Field; Sewanee, TN	L 12–22	700	
^{†}Homecoming; All times are in Central time
