= 1952 Buffalo Bulls football team =

American college football season

1952 Buffalo Bulls football
- Conference: Independent
- Record: 1–7
- Head coach: Fritz Febel (1st season)
- Captain: G. "Buzz" Buzzelli
- Home stadium: Civic Stadium

1952 Eastern college football independents records
	Conf.			Overall
Team	W	L	T	W		L		T
Rochester		–		8	–	0	–	0
Hofstra		–		8	–	1	–	0
No. 19 Princeton		–		8	–	1	–	0
Franklin & Marshall		–		7	–	1	–	0
Villanova		–		7	–	1	–	1
Holy Cross		–		8	–	2	–	0
Yale		–		7	–	2	–	0
Penn State		–		7	–	2	–	1
No. 14 Syracuse		–		7	–	3	–	0
Bucknell		–		6	–	3	–	0
Colgate		–		6	–	3	–	0
Pittsburgh		–		6	–	3	–	0
Carnegie Tech		–		4	–	3	–	0
Harvard		–		5	–	4	–	0
Boston University		–		5	–	4	–	1
Penn		–		4	–	3	–	2
Army		–		4	–	4	–	1
Boston College		–		4	–	4	–	1
Tufts		–		3	–	4	–	1
Drexel		–		3	–	4	–	0
Fordham		–		2	–	5	–	1
NYU		–		2	–	5	–	1
Columbia		–		2	–	6	–	1
Brown		–		2	–	7	–	0
Cornell		–		2	–	7	–	0
Dartmouth		–		2	–	7	–	0
Temple		–		2	–	7	–	1
Buffalo		–		1	–	7	–	0
Rankings from AP Poll

The 1952 Buffalo Bulls football team was an American football team that represented the University of Buffalo as an independent during the 1952 college football season. In their first season under head coach Fritz Febel, the Bulls compiled a 1–7 record and were outscored by a total of 201 to 59. The team played its home games at Civic Stadium in Buffalo, New York.

== Schedule ==
Date	Opponent	Site	Result	Attendance	Source
September 20	at Cortland	Cortland, NY	L 13–33	2,000	
September 27	at Connecticut	Gardner Dow Athletic Fields; Storrs, CT	L 7–47		
October 4	Colgate	Civic Stadium; Buffalo, NY	L 0–13	11,000	
October 11	Lehigh	Civic Stadium; Buffalo, NY	L 7–26	2,000	
October 18	Bucknell	Civic Stadium; Buffalo, NY	L 0–22	1,000	
October 25	at Western Reserve	Clarke Field; Cleveland, OH	L 13–35	5,117	
November 1	Alfred	Civic Stadium; Buffalo, NY	L 7–19		
November 8	St. Lawrence	Civic Stadium; Buffalo, NY	W 12–6		
