= 1952 Rutgers Queensmen football team =

American college football season

1952 Rutgers Queensmen football

Middle Three co-champion
- Conference: Middle Three Conference
- Record: 4–4–1 (1–0 Middle Three)
- Head coach: Harvey Harman (11th season)
- Captains: Russell Sandblom; Howard Anderson
- Home stadium: Rutgers Stadium

1952 Middle Three Conference football standings
| | Conf. | | | | | Overall |
| Team | W | | L | | T | W | | L | | T |
|---|---|---|---|---|---|---|---|---|---|---|
| Lehigh + | 1 | – | 0 | – | 0 | 5 | – | 4 | – | 0 |
| Rutgers + | 1 | – | 0 | – | 0 | 4 | – | 4 | – | 1 |
| Lafayette | 0 | – | 2 | – | 0 | 0 | – | 9 | – | 0 |
+ – Conference co-champions

The 1952 Rutgers Queensmen football team represented Rutgers University in the 1952 college football season. In their 11th season under head coach Harvey Harman, the Queensemen compiled a 4–4–1 record, won the Middle Three Conference co-championship, and were outscored by their opponents 184 to 178.

== Schedule ==
| Date | Opponent | Site | Result | Attendance | Source |
|---|---|---|---|---|---|
| September 27 | Muhlenberg* | Rutgers Stadium; Piscataway, NJ | T 19–19 | 9,000 | |
| October 4 | at No. 13 Princeton* | Palmer Stadium; Princeton, NJ (rivalry) | L 19–61 | 25,000 | |
| October 11 | at Colgate* | Colgate Athletic Field; Hamilton, NY | L 7–13 | 6,000 | |
| October 18 | at Dartmouth* | Memorial Field; Hanover, NH | L 20–29 | 8,000 | |
| October 25 | at Brown* | Brown Stadium; Providence, RI | W 19–7 | 4,500 | |
| November 1 | Temple* | Rutgers Stadium; Piscataway, NJ | W 40–28 | 10,000 | |
| November 8 | Lafayette | Rutgers Stadium; Piscataway, NJ | W 21–6 | 5,000 | |
| November 15 | at Penn State* | New Beaver Field; State College, PA | L 6–7 | 14,000 | |
| November 22 | NYU* | Rutgers Stadium; Piscataway, NJ | W 27–14 | 6,500 | |
*Non-conference game; Rankings from AP Poll released prior to the game
