= 1952 Drexel Dragons football team =

American college football team

1952 Drexel Dragons football
- Conference: Independent
- Record: 3–4
- Head coach: Eddie Allen (3rd season)
- Captains: Gene Hug; Evan Adams
- Home stadium: Drexel Field

1952 Eastern college football independents records
| | Conf. | | | Overall |
| Team | W | L | T | W | | L | | T |
|---|---|---|---|---|---|---|---|---|
| Rochester | | – | | 8 | – | 0 | – | 0 |
| Hofstra | | – | | 8 | – | 1 | – | 0 |
| No. 19 Princeton | | – | | 8 | – | 1 | – | 0 |
| Franklin & Marshall | | – | | 7 | – | 1 | – | 0 |
| Villanova | | – | | 7 | – | 1 | – | 1 |
| Holy Cross | | – | | 8 | – | 2 | – | 0 |
| Yale | | – | | 7 | – | 2 | – | 0 |
| Penn State | | – | | 7 | – | 2 | – | 1 |
| No. 14 Syracuse | | – | | 7 | – | 3 | – | 0 |
| Bucknell | | – | | 6 | – | 3 | – | 0 |
| Colgate | | – | | 6 | – | 3 | – | 0 |
| Pittsburgh | | – | | 6 | – | 3 | – | 0 |
| Carnegie Tech | | – | | 4 | – | 3 | – | 0 |
| Harvard | | – | | 5 | – | 4 | – | 0 |
| Boston University | | – | | 5 | – | 4 | – | 1 |
| Penn | | – | | 4 | – | 3 | – | 2 |
| Army | | – | | 4 | – | 4 | – | 1 |
| Boston College | | – | | 4 | – | 4 | – | 1 |
| Tufts | | – | | 3 | – | 4 | – | 1 |
| Drexel | | – | | 3 | – | 4 | – | 0 |
| Fordham | | – | | 2 | – | 5 | – | 1 |
| NYU | | – | | 2 | – | 5 | – | 1 |
| Columbia | | – | | 2 | – | 6 | – | 1 |
| Brown | | – | | 2 | – | 7 | – | 0 |
| Cornell | | – | | 2 | – | 7 | – | 0 |
| Dartmouth | | – | | 2 | – | 7 | – | 0 |
| Temple | | – | | 2 | – | 7 | – | 1 |
| Buffalo | | – | | 1 | – | 7 | – | 0 |
Rankings from AP Poll

The 1952 Drexel Dragons football team represented the Drexel Institute of Technology (renamed Drexel University in 1970) as an independent during the 1952 college football season. Eddie Allen was the team's head coach.

== Schedule ==
| Date | Opponent | Site | Result | Attendance | Source |
|---|---|---|---|---|---|
| October 4 | Pennsylvania Military | Drexel Field; Philadelphia, PA | L 7–12 | | |
| October 11 | at Ursinus | Collegeville, PA | W 47–39 | | |
| October 18 | at Franklin & Marshall | Williamson Field; Lancaster, PA | L 13–31 | 5,000 | |
| October 25 | Randolph–Macon | Drexel Field; Philadelphia, PA | W 21–13 | | |
| November 1 | at Dickinson | Carlisle, PA | W 33–26 | 6,000 | |
| November 8 | Western Maryland^{†} | Drexel Field; Philadelphia, PA | L 0–6 | 4,000 | |
| November 15 | at Swarthmore | Swarthmore Field; Swarthmore, PA | L 7–26 | | |
^{†}Homecoming

== Roster ==
1952 Drexel Dragons football team roster
Players
Coaches
Offense

| Pos. | # | Name | Class |
|---|---|---|---|
| TE | 23 | Leo O'Connor |
| OT | 40 | Jack Richards | Sr |
| G | | Sugart |
| C | | Paul Von Zech |
| G | 35 | Ted Peetros |
| OT | 43 | Evan Adams (C) | Sr |
| TE | 24 | Semanik |
| HB | | Anderson |
| HB | 12 | Archie Gross | Sr |
| FB | 15 | Art Fischer | Sr |
| QB | | Gene Hug (C) | Sr |
| TE | 26 | Ace Colson | Sr |
| TE | 27 | Leo Hayes | Jr |
| TE | 28 | Glazier |
| TE | 31 | Brooks |
| OT | 45 | Brown |
| OT | 16 | Dick Bjorklund |
| G | | Tom Grindler | Sr |
| G | 36 | Tom Wonderly |
| G | 38 | Jim Hart |
| C | 99 | Ted Rubin |
| G, DE | | Fred Ulmer |
| HB | 13 | Loweree | Sr |
| HB | | Tom Grebis | Jr |
| HB | 17 | Mike DiVenanzio |
| HB | | Joe Haenn | Sr |
| HB | | Poe |
| QB | | Auggie Campiglia |

Defense

| Pos. | # | Name | Class |

Special teams

| Pos. | # | Name | Class |

Head coach

- Eddie Allen (Penn)

Coordinators/assistant coaches

- Tom Miller

Legend

- (C) Team captain
- (S) Suspended
- (I) Ineligible
- Injured
- Redshirt

Roster
Last update: February 16, 2018
