= 1952 Lafayette Leopards football team =

American college football season

1952 Lafayette Leopards football
- Conference: Middle Three Conference
- Record: 0–9 (0–2 Middle Three)
- Head coach: Steve Hokuf (1st season)
- Captains: Edward Greaves; Jack Herbruck
- Home stadium: Fisher Field

1952 Middle Three Conference football standings
	Conf.					Overall
Team	W		L		T	W		L		T
Lehigh +	1	–	0	–	0	5	–	4	–	0
Rutgers +	1	–	0	–	0	4	–	4	–	1
Lafayette	0	–	2	–	0	0	–	9	–	0
+ – Conference co-champions

The 1952 Lafayette Leopards football team was an American football team that represented Lafayette College in the Middle Three Conference during the 1952 college football season. In its first season under head coach Steve Hokuf, the team compiled a 0–9 record. Edward Greaves and Jack Herbruck were the team captains. The team played home games at Fisher Field in Easton, Pennsylvania.

== Schedule ==
Date	Opponent	Site	Result	Attendance	Source
September 27	at Bucknell*	Memorial Stadium; Lewisburg, PA	L 13–45	9,000	
October 4	Albright*	Fisher Field; Easton, PA	L 6–28	4,000	
October 11	at Muhlenberg*	Allentown High School Stadium; Allentown, PA	L 0–37	5,000	
October 18	at Princeton*	Palmer Stadium; Princeton, NJ	L 0–48	10,000	
October 25	at Yale*	Yale Bowl; New Haven, CT	L 0–47	18,000	
November 1	NYU*	Fisher Field; Easton, PA	L 7–14	6,000	
November 8	at Rutgers	Rutgers Stadium; New Brunswick, NJ	L 6–21	5,000	
November 15	at Delaware*	Delaware Stadium; Newark, DE	L 12–13	1,800	
November 22	Lehigh	Fisher Field; Easton, PA (The Rivalry)	L 7–14	15,000	
*Non-conference game
