= 1952 NYU Violets football team =

American college football season

1952 NYU Violets football
- Conference: Independent
- Record: 2–5–1
- Head coach: Hugh Devore (3rd season)
- Home stadium: Triborough Stadium

1952 Eastern college football independents records
	Conf.			Overall
Team	W	L	T	W		L		T
Rochester		–		8	–	0	–	0
Hofstra		–		8	–	1	–	0
No. 19 Princeton		–		8	–	1	–	0
Franklin & Marshall		–		7	–	1	–	0
Villanova		–		7	–	1	–	1
Holy Cross		–		8	–	2	–	0
Yale		–		7	–	2	–	0
Penn State		–		7	–	2	–	1
No. 14 Syracuse		–		7	–	3	–	0
Bucknell		–		6	–	3	–	0
Colgate		–		6	–	3	–	0
Pittsburgh		–		6	–	3	–	0
Carnegie Tech		–		4	–	3	–	0
Harvard		–		5	–	4	–	0
Boston University		–		5	–	4	–	1
Penn		–		4	–	3	–	2
Army		–		4	–	4	–	1
Boston College		–		4	–	4	–	1
Tufts		–		3	–	4	–	1
Drexel		–		3	–	4	–	0
Fordham		–		2	–	5	–	1
NYU		–		2	–	5	–	1
Columbia		–		2	–	6	–	1
Brown		–		2	–	7	–	0
Cornell		–		2	–	7	–	0
Dartmouth		–		2	–	7	–	0
Temple		–		2	–	7	–	1
Buffalo		–		1	–	7	–	0
Rankings from AP Poll

The 1952 NYU Violets football team represented New York University in the 1952 college football season. This was the last season that NYU fielded an NCAA team.

== Schedule ==
Date	Opponent	Site	Result	Attendance	Source
September 27	Lehigh	Triborough Stadium; New York, NY	W 10–7	5,000	
October 4	at Merchant Marine	Tomb Field; Kings Point, NY	T 20–20	5,000	
October 11	Holy Cross	Triborough Stadium; New York, NY	L 0–35	5,000	
October 25	at Temple	Temple Stadium; Philadelphia, PA	L 7–34	5,000	
November 1	at Lafayette	Fisher Field; Easton, PA	W 14–7	6,000	
November 15	at Boston University	Fenway Park; Boston, MA	L 7–14	5,063	
November 22	at Rutgers	Rutgers Stadium; New Brunswick, NJ	L 14–27	6,500	
November 29	vs. Fordham	Triborough Stadium; New York, NY	L 0–45	10,000	
