= 1952 Rochester Yellowjackets football team =

American college football season

1952 Rochester Yellowjackets football
- Conference: Independent
- Record: 8–0
- Head coach: Elmer Burnham (9th season)
- Home stadium: Fauver Stadium

1952 Eastern college football independents records
	Conf.			Overall
Team	W	L	T	W		L		T
Rochester		–		8	–	0	–	0
Hofstra		–		8	–	1	–	0
No. 19 Princeton		–		8	–	1	–	0
Franklin & Marshall		–		7	–	1	–	0
Villanova		–		7	–	1	–	1
Holy Cross		–		8	–	2	–	0
Yale		–		7	–	2	–	0
Penn State		–		7	–	2	–	1
No. 14 Syracuse		–		7	–	3	–	0
Bucknell		–		6	–	3	–	0
Colgate		–		6	–	3	–	0
Pittsburgh		–		6	–	3	–	0
Carnegie Tech		–		4	–	3	–	0
Harvard		–		5	–	4	–	0
Boston University		–		5	–	4	–	1
Penn		–		4	–	3	–	2
Army		–		4	–	4	–	1
Boston College		–		4	–	4	–	1
Tufts		–		3	–	4	–	1
Drexel		–		3	–	4	–	0
Fordham		–		2	–	5	–	1
NYU		–		2	–	5	–	1
Columbia		–		2	–	6	–	1
Brown		–		2	–	7	–	0
Cornell		–		2	–	7	–	0
Dartmouth		–		2	–	7	–	0
Temple		–		2	–	7	–	1
Buffalo		–		1	–	7	–	0
Rankings from AP Poll

The 1952 Rochester Yellowjackets football team, also commonly known as the Rivermen, was an American football team that represented the University of Rochester as an independent during the 1952 college football season. In their ninth year under head coach Elmer Burnham, the Yellowjackets compiled a perfect 8–0 record, shut out the first five opponents, and outscored all opponents by a total of 217 to 68. It was the first perfect season in the 63-year history of Rochester football.

One of the highlights of the season was a game between Rochester led by Elmer Burnham and Oberlin led by Burnham's son, Bob Burnham.

Rochester played its home games at Fauver Stadium in Rochester, New York.

== Schedule ==
Date	Opponent	Site	Result	Attendance	Source
September 27	Merchant Marine	Fauver Stadium; Rochester, NY	W 20–7	4,500	
October 4	at Williams	Weston Field; Williamston, MA	W 12–7		
October 11	Union (NY)	Fauver Stadium; Rochester, NY	W 27–14	6,000	
October 18	Vermont	Fauver Stadium; Rochester, NY	W 12–7	4,500	
October 25	at RPI	Troy, NY	W 41–14		
November 1	at Oberlin	Oberlin, OH	W 34–13	3,000	
November 8	Hamilton^{†}	Fauver Stadium; Rochester, NY	W 33–6	6,000	
November 15	Allegheny	Fauver Stadium; Rochester, NY	W 38–0	7,000	
^{†}Homecoming
