= 1952 Brown Bears football team =

American college football season

1952 Brown Bears football
- Conference: Independent
- Record: 2–7
- Head coach: Alva Kelley (2nd season)
- Captain: M. Matteodo
- Home stadium: Brown Stadium

1952 Eastern college football independents records
	Conf.			Overall
Team	W	L	T	W		L		T
Rochester		–		8	–	0	–	0
Hofstra		–		8	–	1	–	0
No. 19 Princeton		–		8	–	1	–	0
Franklin & Marshall		–		7	–	1	–	0
Villanova		–		7	–	1	–	1
Holy Cross		–		8	–	2	–	0
Yale		–		7	–	2	–	0
Penn State		–		7	–	2	–	1
No. 14 Syracuse		–		7	–	3	–	0
Bucknell		–		6	–	3	–	0
Colgate		–		6	–	3	–	0
Pittsburgh		–		6	–	3	–	0
Carnegie Tech		–		4	–	3	–	0
Harvard		–		5	–	4	–	0
Boston University		–		5	–	4	–	1
Penn		–		4	–	3	–	2
Army		–		4	–	4	–	1
Boston College		–		4	–	4	–	1
Tufts		–		3	–	4	–	1
Drexel		–		3	–	4	–	0
Fordham		–		2	–	5	–	1
NYU		–		2	–	5	–	1
Columbia		–		2	–	6	–	1
Brown		–		2	–	7	–	0
Cornell		–		2	–	7	–	0
Dartmouth		–		2	–	7	–	0
Temple		–		2	–	7	–	1
Buffalo		–		1	–	7	–	0
Rankings from AP Poll

The 1952 Brown Bears football team represented Brown University during the 1952 college football season. In their second season under head coach Alva Kelley, the Bears compiled a 2–7 record, and were outscored 220 to 89. M. Matteodo was the team captain. Brown played its home games at Brown Stadium in Providence, Rhode Island.

== Schedule ==
Date	Opponent	Site	Result	Attendance	Source
October 4	at Yale	Yale Bowl; New Haven, CT	L 0–28	22,500	
October 11	Rhode Island	Brown Stadium; Providence, RI (rivalry)	L 6–7	12,000	
October 18	at Holy Cross	Fitton Field; Worcester, MA	L 0–46	7,500	
October 25	Rutgers	Brown Stadium; Providence, RI	L 7–19	4,500	
November 1	at Princeton	Palmer Stadium; Princeton, NJ	L 0–39	13,000	
November 8	Connecticut	Brown Stadium; Providence, RI	W 21–13	4,500	
November 15	Harvard	Brown Stadium; Providence, RI	W 28–21	12,000	
November 22	at Columbia	Baker Field; New York, NY	L 0–14	4,000	
November 27	Colgate	Brown Stadium; Providence, RI	L 27–33	7,000	
