= 1952 Villanova Wildcats football team =

American college football season

1952 Villanova Wildcats football
- Conference: Independent
- Record: 7–1–1
- Head coach: Art Raimo (2nd season)
- Captain: Richard Haner
- Home stadium: Franklin Field, Shibe Park, Villanova Stadium

1952 Eastern college football independents records
	Conf.			Overall
Team	W	L	T	W		L		T
Rochester		–		8	–	0	–	0
Hofstra		–		8	–	1	–	0
No. 19 Princeton		–		8	–	1	–	0
Franklin & Marshall		–		7	–	1	–	0
Villanova		–		7	–	1	–	1
Holy Cross		–		8	–	2	–	0
Yale		–		7	–	2	–	0
Penn State		–		7	–	2	–	1
No. 14 Syracuse		–		7	–	3	–	0
Bucknell		–		6	–	3	–	0
Colgate		–		6	–	3	–	0
Pittsburgh		–		6	–	3	–	0
Carnegie Tech		–		4	–	3	–	0
Harvard		–		5	–	4	–	0
Boston University		–		5	–	4	–	1
Penn		–		4	–	3	–	2
Army		–		4	–	4	–	1
Boston College		–		4	–	4	–	1
Tufts		–		3	–	4	–	1
Drexel		–		3	–	4	–	0
Fordham		–		2	–	5	–	1
NYU		–		2	–	5	–	1
Columbia		–		2	–	6	–	1
Brown		–		2	–	7	–	0
Cornell		–		2	–	7	–	0
Dartmouth		–		2	–	7	–	0
Temple		–		2	–	7	–	1
Buffalo		–		1	–	7	–	0
Rankings from AP Poll

The 1952 Villanova Wildcats football team represented the Villanova University during the 1952 college football season. The head coach was Art Raimo, coaching his second season with the Wildcats. The team played their home games at Villanova Stadium in Villanova, Pennsylvania.

== Schedule ==
Date	Opponent	Rank	Site	Result	Attendance	Source
September 20	at Kentucky		McLean Stadium; Lexington, KY	W 25–6	33,000	
September 27	at Clemson		Memorial Stadium; Clemson, SC	W 14–7	28,000	
October 4	at Detroit	No. 12	University of Detroit Stadium; Detroit, MI	W 21–7	13,521	
October 11	Wake Forest	No. 14	Franklin Field; Philadelphia, PA	W 20–0	10,000	
October 17	at Boston College	No. 15	Fenway Park; Boston, MA	W 28–7	23,415	
October 25	at Xavier	No. 12	Xavier Stadium; Cincinnati, OH	W 34–20		
October 31	Parris Island Marines	No. 10	Villanova Stadium; Villanova, PA	T 20–20		
November 8	at Tulsa	No. 11	Skelly Stadium; Tulsa, OK	L 6–42	18,000	
November 22	Boston University		Shibe Park; Philadelphia, PA	W 51–6	10,000	
Rankings from AP Poll released prior to the game
