= 1952 Temple Owls football team =

American college football season

1952 Temple Owls football
- Conference: Independent
- Record: 2–7–1
- Head coach: Albert Kawal (4th season)
- Home stadium: Temple Stadium

1952 Eastern college football independents records
	Conf.			Overall
Team	W	L	T	W		L		T
Rochester		–		8	–	0	–	0
Hofstra		–		8	–	1	–	0
No. 19 Princeton		–		8	–	1	–	0
Franklin & Marshall		–		7	–	1	–	0
Villanova		–		7	–	1	–	1
Holy Cross		–		8	–	2	–	0
Yale		–		7	–	2	–	0
Penn State		–		7	–	2	–	1
No. 14 Syracuse		–		7	–	3	–	0
Bucknell		–		6	–	3	–	0
Colgate		–		6	–	3	–	0
Pittsburgh		–		6	–	3	–	0
Carnegie Tech		–		4	–	3	–	0
Harvard		–		5	–	4	–	0
Boston University		–		5	–	4	–	1
Penn		–		4	–	3	–	2
Army		–		4	–	4	–	1
Boston College		–		4	–	4	–	1
Tufts		–		3	–	4	–	1
Drexel		–		3	–	4	–	0
Fordham		–		2	–	5	–	1
NYU		–		2	–	5	–	1
Columbia		–		2	–	6	–	1
Brown		–		2	–	7	–	0
Cornell		–		2	–	7	–	0
Dartmouth		–		2	–	7	–	0
Temple		–		2	–	7	–	1
Buffalo		–		1	–	7	–	0
Rankings from AP Poll

The 1952 Temple Owls football team was an American football team that represented Temple University as an independent during the 1952 college football season. In its fourth season under head coach Albert Kawal, the team compiled a 2–7–1 record and was outscored by a total of 221 to 128. The team played its home games at Temple Stadium in Philadelphia.

== Schedule ==
Date	Opponent	Site	Result	Attendance	Source
September 20	at Penn State	New Beaver Field; State College, PA	L 13–20	15,000	
September 26	Albright	Temple Stadium; Philadelphia, PA	W 21–0	5,000	
October 3	Syracuse	Temple Stadium; Philadelphia, PA	L 0–27	10,000	
October 10	Bucknell	Temple Stadium; Philadelphia, PA	L 12–19	12,000	
October 18	at Indiana	Memorial Stadium; Bloomington, IN	L 0–33	28,000	
October 25	NYU^{†}	Temple Stadium; Philadelphia, PA	W 34–7	5,000	
November 1	at Rutgers	Rutgers Stadium; Piscataway, NJ	L 28–40	10,000	
November 8	at Boston University	Fenway Park; Boston, MA	T 14–14	9,536	
November 15	Fordham	Temple Stadium; Philadelphia, PA	L 6–33	500	
November 22	at Holy Cross	Fitton Field; Worcester, MA	L 0–28	1,600	
^{†}Homecoming
