= 1952 Boston University Terriers football team =

American college football season

1952 Boston University Terriers football
- Conference: Independent
- Record: 5–4–1
- Head coach: Aldo Donelli (6th season)
- Home stadium: Fenway Park

1952 Eastern college football independents records
| | Conf. | | | Overall |
| Team | W | L | T | W | | L | | T |
|---|---|---|---|---|---|---|---|---|
| Rochester | | – | | 8 | – | 0 | – | 0 |
| Hofstra | | – | | 8 | – | 1 | – | 0 |
| No. 19 Princeton | | – | | 8 | – | 1 | – | 0 |
| Franklin & Marshall | | – | | 7 | – | 1 | – | 0 |
| Villanova | | – | | 7 | – | 1 | – | 1 |
| Holy Cross | | – | | 8 | – | 2 | – | 0 |
| Yale | | – | | 7 | – | 2 | – | 0 |
| Penn State | | – | | 7 | – | 2 | – | 1 |
| No. 14 Syracuse | | – | | 7 | – | 3 | – | 0 |
| Bucknell | | – | | 6 | – | 3 | – | 0 |
| Colgate | | – | | 6 | – | 3 | – | 0 |
| Pittsburgh | | – | | 6 | – | 3 | – | 0 |
| Carnegie Tech | | – | | 4 | – | 3 | – | 0 |
| Harvard | | – | | 5 | – | 4 | – | 0 |
| Boston University | | – | | 5 | – | 4 | – | 1 |
| Penn | | – | | 4 | – | 3 | – | 2 |
| Army | | – | | 4 | – | 4 | – | 1 |
| Boston College | | – | | 4 | – | 4 | – | 1 |
| Tufts | | – | | 3 | – | 4 | – | 1 |
| Drexel | | – | | 3 | – | 4 | – | 0 |
| Fordham | | – | | 2 | – | 5 | – | 1 |
| NYU | | – | | 2 | – | 5 | – | 1 |
| Columbia | | – | | 2 | – | 6 | – | 1 |
| Brown | | – | | 2 | – | 7 | – | 0 |
| Cornell | | – | | 2 | – | 7 | – | 0 |
| Dartmouth | | – | | 2 | – | 7 | – | 0 |
| Temple | | – | | 2 | – | 7 | – | 1 |
| Buffalo | | – | | 1 | – | 7 | – | 0 |
Rankings from AP Poll

The 1952 Boston University Terriers football team was an American football team that represented Boston University as an independent during the 1952 college football season. In its sixth season under head coach Aldo Donelli, the team compiled a 5–4–1 record and was outscored by their opponents by a total of 139 to 216.

== Schedule ==
| Date | Time | Opponent | Site | Result | Attendance | Source |
|---|---|---|---|---|---|---|
| September 20 | | at Wichita | Veterans Field; Wichita, KS | W 6–0 | 12,500 | |
| September 26 | 8:15 p.m. | at Syracuse | Archbold Stadium; Syracuse, NY | L 21–34 | 15,000 | |
| October 4 | | at Marquette | Marquette Stadium; Milwaukee, WI | L 0–21 | 14,000 | |
| October 10 | | Miami (FL) | Fenway Park; Boston, MA | W 9–7 | 14,522 | |
| October 18 | | William & Mary | Fenway Park; Boston, MA | W 33–28 | 15,855 | |
| October 25 | | at Lehigh | Taylor Stadium; Bethlehem, PA | W 29–20 | 9,000 | |
| November 1 | | No. 2 Maryland | Fenway Park; Boston, MA | L 7–34 | 32,568 | |
| November 8 | | Temple | Fenway Park; Boston, MA | T 14–14 | 9,536 | |
| November 15 | | NYU | Fenway Park; Boston, MA | W 14–7 | 5,063 | |
| November 22 | | at Villanova | Shibe Park; Philadelphia, PA | L 6–51 | 10,000 | |
Rankings from AP Poll released prior to the game; All times are in Eastern time
