= 1952 Lehigh Engineers football team =

American college football season

1952 Lehigh Engineers football

Middle Three co-champion
- Conference: Middle Three Conference
- Record: 5–4 (1–0 Middle Three)
- Head coach: Bill Leckonby (7th season)
- Captain: Bill Kitsos
- Home stadium: Taylor Stadium

1952 Middle Three Conference football standings
	Conf.					Overall
Team	W		L		T	W		L		T
Lehigh +	1	–	0	–	0	5	–	4	–	0
Rutgers +	1	–	0	–	0	4	–	4	–	1
Lafayette	0	–	2	–	0	0	–	9	–	0
+ – Conference co-champions

The 1952 Lehigh Engineers football team was an American football team that represented Lehigh University during the 1952 college football season. Lehigh tied for the Middle Three Conference championship. In their third year under head coach Bill Leckonby, the Engineers compiled a 5–4 record. Lehigh only played one of its Middle Three opponents, beating Lafayette; co-champion Rutgers also beat Lafayette but did not face Lehigh, giving them identical 1–0 conference records. Bill Kitsos was the team captain. Lehigh played home games at Taylor Stadium on the university's main campus in Bethlehem, Pennsylvania.

== Schedule ==
Date	Opponent	Site	Result	Attendance	Source
September 27	at NYU*	Triborough Stadium; New York, NY	L 7–10	5,000	
October 4	Delaware*	Taylor Stadium; Bethlehem, PA	L 6–7	7,000	
October 11	at Buffalo*	Civic Stadium; Buffalo, NY	W 26–7	2,000	
October 18	Gettysburg*	Taylor Stadium; Bethlehem, PA	W 15–7	7,000	
October 25	Boston University^{†}*	Taylor Stadium; Bethlehem, PA	L 20–29	9,000	
November 1	at Bucknell*	Memorial Stadium; Lewisburg, PA	L 6–28	5,500	
November 8	Muhlenberg*	Taylor Stadium; Bethlehem, PA	W 26–13	7,500	
November 15	Carnegie Tech*	Taylor Stadium; Bethlehem, PA	W 26–6	4,000	
November 22	at Lafayette	Fisher Field; Easton, PA (The Rivalry)	W 14–7	15,000	
*Non-conference game; ^{†}Homecoming
