= 1952 Syracuse Orangemen football team =

American college football season

1952 Syracuse Orangemen football

Eastern champion

Orange Bowl, L 6–61 vs. Alabama
- Conference: Independent

Ranking
- AP: No. 14
- Record: 7–3
- Head coach: Ben Schwartzwalder (4th season)
- Captains: Richard Beyer; Joe Szombathy
- Home stadium: Archbold Stadium

1952 Eastern college football independents records
	Conf.			Overall
Team	W	L	T	W		L		T
Rochester		–		8	–	0	–	0
Hofstra		–		8	–	1	–	0
No. 19 Princeton		–		8	–	1	–	0
Franklin & Marshall		–		7	–	1	–	0
Villanova		–		7	–	1	–	1
Holy Cross		–		8	–	2	–	0
Yale		–		7	–	2	–	0
Penn State		–		7	–	2	–	1
No. 14 Syracuse		–		7	–	3	–	0
Bucknell		–		6	–	3	–	0
Colgate		–		6	–	3	–	0
Pittsburgh		–		6	–	3	–	0
Carnegie Tech		–		4	–	3	–	0
Harvard		–		5	–	4	–	0
Boston University		–		5	–	4	–	1
Penn		–		4	–	3	–	2
Army		–		4	–	4	–	1
Boston College		–		4	–	4	–	1
Tufts		–		3	–	4	–	1
Drexel		–		3	–	4	–	0
Fordham		–		2	–	5	–	1
NYU		–		2	–	5	–	1
Columbia		–		2	–	6	–	1
Brown		–		2	–	7	–	0
Cornell		–		2	–	7	–	0
Dartmouth		–		2	–	7	–	0
Temple		–		2	–	7	–	1
Buffalo		–		1	–	7	–	0
Rankings from AP Poll

The 1952 Syracuse Orangemen football team represented Syracuse University as an independent during the 1952 college football season. The Orangemen were led by fourth-year head coach Ben Schwartzwalder and played their home games at Archbold Stadium in Syracuse, New York.

This was a historically successful season for the Orangemen, which included victories over rivals Penn State and Colgate. Syracuse lost only twice in the regular season: their season opener against the former college all-stars of the Bolling Air Force Base, and to eventual national champions Michigan State. Syracuse finished the regular season with a record of 7–2 and were ranked 14th in the final AP Poll, their first ranked finish in school history.

The team was awarded its first Lambert Trophy, which signified them as champions of the East. They were invited to the 1953 Orange Bowl after Navy refused the bid. This was the school's first ever bowl game, where they lost to Alabama in a lopsided 61–6 game.

== Schedule ==
Date	Time	Opponent	Rank	Site	Result	Attendance	Source
September 20		Bolling Field		Archbold Stadium; Syracuse, NY	L 12–13	18,000	
September 26	8:15 p.m.	Boston University		Archbold Stadium; Syracuse, NY	W 34–21	15,000	
October 3		at Temple		Temple Stadium; Philadelphia, PA	W 27–0	10,500	
October 11		Cornell		Archbold Stadium; Syracuse, NY	W 26–6	23,000	
October 18		at No. 1 Michigan State		Macklin Stadium; East Lansing, MI	L 7–48	38,254	
October 25		Holy Cross		Archbold Stadium; Syracuse, NY	W 20–19	18,000	
November 8		No. 15 Penn State		Archbold Stadium; Syracuse, NY (rivalry)	W 25–7	15,000	
November 15		Colgate	No. 13	Archbold Stadium; Syracuse, NY (rivalry)	W 20–14	32,000	
November 22		at Fordham	No. 15	Triborough Stadium; New York, NY	W 26–13	10,000	
January 1		vs. No. 9 Alabama	No. 14	Burdine Stadium; Miami, FL (Orange Bowl)	L 6–61	66,280	
Rankings from AP Poll released prior to the game; All times are in Eastern time
