= 1952 Harvard Crimson football team =

American college football season

1952 Harvard Crimson football
- Conference: Independent
- Record: 5–4
- Head coach: Lloyd Jordan (3rd season)
- Captain: John D. Nichols Jr.
- Home stadium: Harvard Stadium

1952 Eastern college football independents records
	Conf.			Overall
Team	W	L	T	W		L		T
Rochester		–		8	–	0	–	0
Hofstra		–		8	–	1	–	0
No. 19 Princeton		–		8	–	1	–	0
Franklin & Marshall		–		7	–	1	–	0
Villanova		–		7	–	1	–	1
Holy Cross		–		8	–	2	–	0
Yale		–		7	–	2	–	0
Penn State		–		7	–	2	–	1
No. 14 Syracuse		–		7	–	3	–	0
Bucknell		–		6	–	3	–	0
Colgate		–		6	–	3	–	0
Pittsburgh		–		6	–	3	–	0
Carnegie Tech		–		4	–	3	–	0
Harvard		–		5	–	4	–	0
Boston University		–		5	–	4	–	1
Penn		–		4	–	3	–	2
Army		–		4	–	4	–	1
Boston College		–		4	–	4	–	1
Tufts		–		3	–	4	–	1
Drexel		–		3	–	4	–	0
Fordham		–		2	–	5	–	1
NYU		–		2	–	5	–	1
Columbia		–		2	–	6	–	1
Brown		–		2	–	7	–	0
Cornell		–		2	–	7	–	0
Dartmouth		–		2	–	7	–	0
Temple		–		2	–	7	–	1
Buffalo		–		1	–	7	–	0
Rankings from AP Poll

The 1952 Harvard Crimson football team was an American football team that represented Harvard University as an independent during the 1952 college football season. In their third year under head coach Lloyd Jordan, the Crimson compiled a 5–4 record and outscored opponents 214 to 198. John D. Nichols Jr. was the team captain.

Harvard played its home games at Harvard Stadium in the Allston neighborhood of Boston, Massachusetts.

== Schedule ==
Date	Time	Opponent	Site	Result	Attendance	Source
September 27		Springfield	Harvard Stadium; Boston, MA	W 27–7	9,000	
October 4		Columbia	Harvard Stadium; Boston, MA	L 7–16	14,000	
October 11	2:00 p.m.	Washington University	Harvard Stadium; Boston, MA	W 42–0	7,000	
October 18		Colgate	Harvard Stadium; Boston, MA	W 21–20	14,000	
October 25		Dartmouth	Harvard Stadium; Boston, MA (rivalry)	W 26–19	31,000	
November 1		Davidson	Harvard Stadium; Boston, MA	W 35–26	6,500	
November 8		at No. 19 Princeton	Palmer Stadium; Princeton, NJ (rivalry)	L 21–41	35,000	
November 15		at Brown	Brown Stadium; Providence, RI	L 21–28	12,000	
November 22		Yale	Harvard Stadium; Boston, MA (rivalry)	L 14–41	38,114	
Rankings from AP Poll released prior to the game; All times are in Eastern time
