= 1952 New Hampshire Wildcats football team =

American college football season

1952 New Hampshire Wildcats football
- Conference: Yankee Conference
- Record: 3–4–1 (0–4 Yankee)
- Head coach: Chief Boston (4th season)
- Home stadium: Cowell Stadium

1952 Yankee Conference football standings
	Conf.					Overall
Team	W		L		T	W		L		T
Connecticut +	3	–	1	–	0	5	–	3	–	0
Maine +	3	–	1	–	0	4	–	3	–	0
Rhode Island +	3	–	1	–	0	7	–	1	–	0
UMass	1	–	2	–	0	4	–	3	–	1
Vermont	0	–	1	–	0	2	–	5	–	0
New Hampshire	0	–	4	–	0	2	–	4	–	1
+ – Conference co-champions

The 1952 New Hampshire Wildcats football team was an American football team that represented the University of New Hampshire as a member of the Yankee Conference during the 1952 college football season. In its fourth year under head coach Chief Boston, the team compiled a perfect 3–4–1 record (0–4 against conference opponents) and finished sixth out of six teams in the Yankee Conference.

== Schedule ==
Date	Opponent	Site	Result	Attendance	Source
September 27	at Upsala*	East Orange, NJ	W 13–7		
October 4	Rhode Island	Cowell Stadium; Durham, NH	L 7–27		
October 11	at Maine	Orono, ME (Battle for the Brice–Cowell Musket)	L 7–24		
October 18	Springfield*	Cowell Stadium; Durham, NH	T 14–14		
October 25	at St. Lawrence*	Canton, MY	W 28–19		
November 1	Connecticut	Cowell Stadium; Durham, NH	L 12–16		
November 8	at UMass	Alumni Field; Amherst, MA (rivalry)	L 13–25		
November 15	Kent State*	Cowell Stadium; Durham, NH	W 23–21		
*Non-conference game
