= 1952 UMass Redmen football team =

American college football season

1952 UMass Redmen football
- Conference: Yankee Conference
- Record: 4–3–1 (1–2 Yankee)
- Head coach: Charlie O'Rourke (1st season)
- Home stadium: Alumni Field

1952 Yankee Conference football standings
	Conf.					Overall
Team	W		L		T	W		L		T
Connecticut +	3	–	1	–	0	5	–	3	–	0
Maine +	3	–	1	–	0	4	–	3	–	0
Rhode Island +	3	–	1	–	0	7	–	1	–	0
UMass	1	–	2	–	0	4	–	3	–	1
Vermont	0	–	1	–	0	2	–	5	–	0
New Hampshire	0	–	4	–	0	2	–	4	–	1
+ – Conference co-champions

The 1952 UMass Redmen football team represented the University of Massachusetts Amherst in the 1952 college football season as a member of the Yankee Conference. The team was coached by Charlie O'Rourke and played its home games at Alumni Field in Amherst, Massachusetts. The 1952 season was O'Rourke's first as coach of the Minutemen, and was his only winning season with the team. UMass finished the season with a record of 4–3–1 overall and 1–2 in conference play.

== Schedule ==
Date	Opponent	Site	Result	Attendance	Source
September 27	Bates*	Alumni Field; Amherst, MA	W 39–6		
October 4	at Connecticut	Gardner Dow Athletic Fields; Storrs, CT (rivalry)	L 13–26		
October 11	Springfield*	Alumni Field; Amherst, MA	T 20–20		
October 18	at Rhode Island	Meade Stadium; Kingston, RI	L 7–26	4,000	
October 25	Northeastern*	Alumni Field; Amherst, MA	L 26–40		
November 1	at Brandeis*	Brandeis Stadium; Waltham, MA	W 26–6		
November 8	New Hampshire	Alumni Field; Amherst, MA (rivalry)	W 26–13		
November 15	at Tufts*	Tufts Oval; Somerville, MA	W 32–0		
*Non-conference game
