= 1952 Army Cadets football team =

American college football season

1952 Army Cadets football
- Conference: Independent
- Record: 4–4–1
- Head coach: Earl Blaik (12th season)
- Captain: Alfred Paulekas
- Home stadium: Michie Stadium

1952 Eastern college football independents records
	Conf.			Overall
Team	W	L	T	W		L		T
Rochester		–		8	–	0	–	0
Hofstra		–		8	–	1	–	0
No. 19 Princeton		–		8	–	1	–	0
Franklin & Marshall		–		7	–	1	–	0
Villanova		–		7	–	1	–	1
Holy Cross		–		8	–	2	–	0
Yale		–		7	–	2	–	0
Penn State		–		7	–	2	–	1
No. 14 Syracuse		–		7	–	3	–	0
Bucknell		–		6	–	3	–	0
Colgate		–		6	–	3	–	0
Pittsburgh		–		6	–	3	–	0
Carnegie Tech		–		4	–	3	–	0
Harvard		–		5	–	4	–	0
Boston University		–		5	–	4	–	1
Penn		–		4	–	3	–	2
Army		–		4	–	4	–	1
Boston College		–		4	–	4	–	1
Tufts		–		3	–	4	–	1
Drexel		–		3	–	4	–	0
Fordham		–		2	–	5	–	1
NYU		–		2	–	5	–	1
Columbia		–		2	–	6	–	1
Brown		–		2	–	7	–	0
Cornell		–		2	–	7	–	0
Dartmouth		–		2	–	7	–	0
Temple		–		2	–	7	–	1
Buffalo		–		1	–	7	–	0
Rankings from AP Poll

The 1952 Army Cadets football team represented the United States Military Academy as an independent during the 1952 college football season. Led by 12th-year head coach Earl Blaik, the Cadets compiled a record of 4–4–1. Army played home games at Michie Stadium in West Point, New York.

== Schedule ==
Date	Time	Opponent	Site	TV	Result	Attendance	Source
September 27		South Carolina	Michie Stadium; West Point, NY		W 28–7	23,474	
October 4		at No. 7 USC	Los Angeles Memorial Coliseum; Los Angeles, CA		L 0–22	48,433	
October 11		Dartmouth	Michie Stadium; West Point, NY		W 37–7	18,127	
October 18		Pittsburgh	Michie Stadium; West Point, NY t		L 14–22	18,850	
October 25		at Columbia	Baker Field; New York, NY		T 14–14	31,000	
November 1		VMI	Michie Stadium; West Point, NY		W 42–14		
November 8		at No. 3 Georgia Tech	Grant Field; Atlanta, GA		L 6–45	40,000	
November 15		at Penn	Franklin Field; Philadelphia, PA		W 14–13	40,000	
November 29	1:00 p.m.	vs. Navy	Philadelphia Municipal Stadium; Philadelphia, PA (Army–Navy Game)	NBC	L 0–7		
Rankings from AP Poll released prior to the game; All times are in Eastern time

== Roster ==
1952 Army Cadets football team roster
Players
Coaches
Offense

Pos.	#	Name	Class
HB		Tommy Bell	So
QB		Pete Vann	So
G		Leroy Lunn	Jr

Defense

Pos.	#	Name	Class

Special teams

Pos.	#	Name	Class

Head coach

- Earl Blaik

Coordinators/assistant coaches

Legend

- (C) Team captain
- (S) Suspended
- (I) Ineligible
- Injured
- Redshirt
