= 1952 Bucknell Bison football team =

American college football season

1952 Bucknell Bison football
- Conference: Independent
- Record: 6–3
- Head coach: Harry Lawrence (6th season)
- Captains: Harry McSorley; Abe Powelson
- Home stadium: Memorial Stadium

1952 Eastern college football independents records
| | Conf. | | | Overall |
| Team | W | L | T | W | | L | | T |
|---|---|---|---|---|---|---|---|---|
| Rochester | | – | | 8 | – | 0 | – | 0 |
| Hofstra | | – | | 8 | – | 1 | – | 0 |
| No. 19 Princeton | | – | | 8 | – | 1 | – | 0 |
| Franklin & Marshall | | – | | 7 | – | 1 | – | 0 |
| Villanova | | – | | 7 | – | 1 | – | 1 |
| Holy Cross | | – | | 8 | – | 2 | – | 0 |
| Yale | | – | | 7 | – | 2 | – | 0 |
| Penn State | | – | | 7 | – | 2 | – | 1 |
| No. 14 Syracuse | | – | | 7 | – | 3 | – | 0 |
| Bucknell | | – | | 6 | – | 3 | – | 0 |
| Colgate | | – | | 6 | – | 3 | – | 0 |
| Pittsburgh | | – | | 6 | – | 3 | – | 0 |
| Carnegie Tech | | – | | 4 | – | 3 | – | 0 |
| Harvard | | – | | 5 | – | 4 | – | 0 |
| Boston University | | – | | 5 | – | 4 | – | 1 |
| Penn | | – | | 4 | – | 3 | – | 2 |
| Army | | – | | 4 | – | 4 | – | 1 |
| Boston College | | – | | 4 | – | 4 | – | 1 |
| Tufts | | – | | 3 | – | 4 | – | 1 |
| Drexel | | – | | 3 | – | 4 | – | 0 |
| Fordham | | – | | 2 | – | 5 | – | 1 |
| NYU | | – | | 2 | – | 5 | – | 1 |
| Columbia | | – | | 2 | – | 6 | – | 1 |
| Brown | | – | | 2 | – | 7 | – | 0 |
| Cornell | | – | | 2 | – | 7 | – | 0 |
| Dartmouth | | – | | 2 | – | 7 | – | 0 |
| Temple | | – | | 2 | – | 7 | – | 1 |
| Buffalo | | – | | 1 | – | 7 | – | 0 |
Rankings from AP Poll

The 1952 Bucknell Bison football team was an American football team that represented Bucknell University as an independent during the 1952 college football season.

In its sixth season under head coach Harry Lawrence, the team compiled a 6–3 record. Harry McSorley and Abe Powelson were the team captains.

The team played its home games at Memorial Stadium in Lewisburg, Pennsylvania.

== Schedule ==
| Date | Opponent | Site | Result | Attendance | Source |
|---|---|---|---|---|---|
| September 27 | Lafayette | Memorial Stadium; Lewisburg, PA | W 45–13 | 9,000 | |
| October 4 | at Muhlenberg | Allentown High School Stadium; Allentown, PA | W 46–12 | 9,000 | |
| October 10 | at Temple | Temple Stadium; Philadelphia, PA | W 19–12 | 12,000 | |
| October 18 | at Buffalo | Civic Stadium; Buffalo, NY | W 22–0 | 1,000 | |
| October 25 | Colgate^{†} | Memorial Stadium; Lewisburg, PA | L 0–28 | 12,000 | |
| November 1 | Lehigh | Memorial Stadium; Lewisburg, PA | W 28–6 | 5,500 | |
| November 7 | at George Washington | Griffith Stadium; Washington, DC | L 7–21 | 4,000 | |
| November 15 | Gettysburg | Memorial Stadium; Lewisburg, PA | W 26–21 | | |
| November 22 | at Delaware | Delaware Stadium; Newark, DE | L 0–13 | 2,500 | |
^{†}Homecoming
