= 1952 Princeton Tigers football team =

American college football season

1952 Princeton Tigers football
- Conference: Independent

Ranking
- Coaches: No. 14
- AP: No. 19
- Record: 8–1
- Head coach: Charlie Caldwell (8th season)
- Captain: Frank M. McPhee
- Home stadium: Palmer Stadium

1952 Eastern college football independents records
	Conf.			Overall
Team	W	L	T	W		L		T
Rochester		–		8	–	0	–	0
Hofstra		–		8	–	1	–	0
No. 19 Princeton		–		8	–	1	–	0
Franklin & Marshall		–		7	–	1	–	0
Villanova		–		7	–	1	–	1
Holy Cross		–		8	–	2	–	0
Yale		–		7	–	2	–	0
Penn State		–		7	–	2	–	1
No. 14 Syracuse		–		7	–	3	–	0
Bucknell		–		6	–	3	–	0
Colgate		–		6	–	3	–	0
Pittsburgh		–		6	–	3	–	0
Carnegie Tech		–		4	–	3	–	0
Harvard		–		5	–	4	–	0
Boston University		–		5	–	4	–	1
Penn		–		4	–	3	–	2
Army		–		4	–	4	–	1
Boston College		–		4	–	4	–	1
Tufts		–		3	–	4	–	1
Drexel		–		3	–	4	–	0
Fordham		–		2	–	5	–	1
NYU		–		2	–	5	–	1
Columbia		–		2	–	6	–	1
Brown		–		2	–	7	–	0
Cornell		–		2	–	7	–	0
Dartmouth		–		2	–	7	–	0
Temple		–		2	–	7	–	1
Buffalo		–		1	–	7	–	0
Rankings from AP Poll

The 1952 Princeton Tigers football team was an American football team that represented Princeton University during the 1952 college football season. In their eighth year under head coach Charlie Caldwell, the Tigers compiled an 8–1 record and outscored opponents 297 to 74. Frank M. McPhee was the team captain.

The Tigers were ranked No. 12 in the preseason AP poll and stayed in the top 20 until suffering their only loss of the year, in mid-October. They then re-entered the rankings in mid-November and finished the year as the only ranked Ivy Group team.

Princeton played its home games at Palmer Stadium on the university campus in Princeton, New Jersey.

== Schedule ==
Date	Opponent	Rank	Site	Result	Attendance	Source
September 27	at Columbia	No. 12	Baker Field; New York, NY	W 14–0	30,000	
October 4	Rutgers	No. 13	Palmer Stadium; Princeton, NJ (rivalry)	W 61–19	25,000	
October 11	Penn	No. 10	Palmer Stadium; Princeton, NJ (rivalry)	L 7–13	40,000	
October 18	Lafayette		Palmer Stadium; Princeton, NJ	W 48–0	10,000	
October 25	at Cornell		Schoellkopf Field; Ithaca, NY	W 27–0	28,000	
November 1	Brown		Palmer Stadium; Princeton, NJ	W 39–0	13,000	
November 8	Harvard	No. 19	Palmer Stadium; Princeton, NJ (rivalry)	W 41–21	35,000	
November 15	at Yale	No. 16	Yale Bowl; New Haven, CT (rivalry)	W 27–21	62,000	
November 22	Dartmouth	No. 17	Palmer Stadium; Princeton, NJ	W 33–0	26,000	
Rankings from AP Poll released prior to the game
