= 1952 Penn Quakers football team =

American college football season

1952 Penn Quakers football
- Conference: Independent
- Record: 4–3–2
- Head coach: George Munger (14th season)
- Home stadium: Franklin Field

1952 Eastern college football independents records
	Conf.			Overall
Team	W	L	T	W		L		T
Rochester		–		8	–	0	–	0
Hofstra		–		8	–	1	–	0
No. 19 Princeton		–		8	–	1	–	0
Franklin & Marshall		–		7	–	1	–	0
Villanova		–		7	–	1	–	1
Holy Cross		–		8	–	2	–	0
Yale		–		7	–	2	–	0
Penn State		–		7	–	2	–	1
No. 14 Syracuse		–		7	–	3	–	0
Bucknell		–		6	–	3	–	0
Colgate		–		6	–	3	–	0
Pittsburgh		–		6	–	3	–	0
Carnegie Tech		–		4	–	3	–	0
Harvard		–		5	–	4	–	0
Boston University		–		5	–	4	–	1
Penn		–		4	–	3	–	2
Army		–		4	–	4	–	1
Boston College		–		4	–	4	–	1
Tufts		–		3	–	4	–	1
Drexel		–		3	–	4	–	0
Fordham		–		2	–	5	–	1
NYU		–		2	–	5	–	1
Columbia		–		2	–	6	–	1
Brown		–		2	–	7	–	0
Cornell		–		2	–	7	–	0
Dartmouth		–		2	–	7	–	0
Temple		–		2	–	7	–	1
Buffalo		–		1	–	7	–	0
Rankings from AP Poll

The 1952 Penn Quakers football team represented the University of Pennsylvania during the 1952 college football season. In George Munger's 14th season as head coach, the Quakers compiled a 4–3–2 record, and outscored their opponents 122 to 107. They achieved a 1–0–1 record against ranked teams, knocking off top-ten Princeton and tying a Notre Dame team that would finish ranked third nationally.

== Schedule ==
Date	Opponent	Rank	Site	Result	Attendance	Source
September 27	No. 10 Notre Dame	No. 12	Franklin Field; Philadelphia, PA	T 7–7	74,518	
October 4	Dartmouth		Franklin Field; Philadelphia, PA	W 7–0	35,000	
October 11	at No. 10 Princeton		Palmer Stadium; Princeton, NJ	W 13–7	40,000	
October 18	at Columbia	No. 14	Baker Field; New York, NY	W 27–17	20,000	
October 25	Navy	No. 11	Franklin Field; Philadelphia, PA	T 7–7	66,000	
November 1	Penn State	No. 17	Franklin Field; Philadelphia, PA	L 7–14	67,000	
November 8	Georgia		Franklin Field; Philadelphia, PA	L 27–34	45,000	
November 15	Army		Franklin Field; Philadelphia, PA	L 13–14	40,000	
November 27	Cornell		Franklin Field; Philadelphia, PA	W 14–7	40,000	
Rankings from AP Poll released prior to the game
