= 1952 Holy Cross Crusaders football team =

American college football season

1952 Holy Cross Crusaders football
- Conference: Independent
- Record: 8–2
- Head coach: Eddie Anderson (9th season)
- Home stadium: Fitton Field

1952 Eastern college football independents records
	Conf.			Overall
Team	W	L	T	W		L		T
Rochester		–		8	–	0	–	0
Hofstra		–		8	–	1	–	0
No. 19 Princeton		–		8	–	1	–	0
Franklin & Marshall		–		7	–	1	–	0
Villanova		–		7	–	1	–	1
Holy Cross		–		8	–	2	–	0
Yale		–		7	–	2	–	0
Penn State		–		7	–	2	–	1
No. 14 Syracuse		–		7	–	3	–	0
Bucknell		–		6	–	3	–	0
Colgate		–		6	–	3	–	0
Pittsburgh		–		6	–	3	–	0
Carnegie Tech		–		4	–	3	–	0
Harvard		–		5	–	4	–	0
Boston University		–		5	–	4	–	1
Penn		–		4	–	3	–	2
Army		–		4	–	4	–	1
Boston College		–		4	–	4	–	1
Tufts		–		3	–	4	–	1
Drexel		–		3	–	4	–	0
Fordham		–		2	–	5	–	1
NYU		–		2	–	5	–	1
Columbia		–		2	–	6	–	1
Brown		–		2	–	7	–	0
Cornell		–		2	–	7	–	0
Dartmouth		–		2	–	7	–	0
Temple		–		2	–	7	–	1
Buffalo		–		1	–	7	–	0
Rankings from AP Poll

The 1952 Holy Cross Crusaders football team was an American football team that represented the College of the Holy Cross as an independent during the 1952 college football season. In its ninth year under head coach Eddie Anderson, the team compiled an 8–2 record. The team played its home games at Fitton Field in Worcester, Massachusetts.

== Schedule ==
Date	Opponent	Site	Result	Attendance	Source
September 27	at Dartmouth	Memorial Field; Hanover, NH	W 27–9	14,327	
October 4	Fordham^{†}	Fitton Field; Worcester, MA (rivalry)	W 12–7	21,895	
October 11	at NYU	Triborough Stadium; New York, NY	W 35–0	5,000	
October 18	Brown	Fitton Field; Worcester, MA	W 46–0	7,500	
October 25	at Syracuse	Archbold Stadium; Syracuse, NY	L 19–20	18,000	
November 1	at Marquette	Marquette Stadium; Milwaukee, WI	W 7–0	20,050	
November 8	Colgate	Fitton Field; Worcester, MA	W 13–7	10,000	
November 16	Quantico Marines	Fitton Field; Worcester, MA	L 18–27	12,000	
November 22	Temple	Fitton Field; Worcester, MA	W 28–0	1,600	
November 29	vs. Boston College	Braves Field; Boston, MA (rivalry)	W 21–7	37,889	
^{†}Homecoming
