= 1952 Vermont Catamounts football team =

American college football season

1952 Vermont Catamounts football
- Conference: Yankee Conference
- Record: 2–5 (0–1 Yankee)
- Head coach: J. Edward Donnelly (1st season)
- Home stadium: Centennial Field

1952 Yankee Conference football standings
	Conf.					Overall
Team	W		L		T	W		L		T
Connecticut +	3	–	1	–	0	5	–	3	–	0
Maine +	3	–	1	–	0	4	–	3	–	0
Rhode Island +	3	–	1	–	0	7	–	1	–	0
UMass	1	–	2	–	0	4	–	3	–	1
Vermont	0	–	1	–	0	2	–	5	–	0
New Hampshire	0	–	4	–	0	2	–	4	–	1
+ – Conference co-champions

The 1952 Vermont Catamounts football team was an American football team that represented the University of Vermont in the Yankee Conference during the 1952 college football season. In their first year under head coach J. Edward Donnelly, the team compiled a 2–5 record.

== Schedule ==
Date	Opponent	Site	Result	Attendance	Source
September 27	Champlain College*	Centennial Field; Burlington, VT	W 33–0		
October 4	Maine^{†}	Centennial Field; Burlington, VT	L 6–14	5,000	
October 11	at Saint Michael's*	Athletic Field; Burlington, VT	L 0–19	6,000	
October 18	at Rochester*	Fauver Stadium; Rochester, NY	L 7–12	4,500	
October 25	at Norwich*	Sabine Field; Northfield, VT	W 27–26	3,000	
November 1	Northeastern*	Centennial Field; Burlington, VT	L 6–33	4,500	
November 8	Middlebury*	Centennial Field; Burlington, VT	L 13–19	6,500	
*Non-conference game; ^{†}Homecoming
