= 1952 Colgate Red Raiders football team =

American college football season

1952 Colgate Red Raiders football
- Conference: Independent
- Record: 6–3
- Head coach: Hal Lahar (1st season)
- Captain: Donald Main
- Home stadium: Colgate Athletic Field

1952 Eastern college football independents records
	Conf.			Overall
Team	W	L	T	W		L		T
Rochester		–		8	–	0	–	0
Hofstra		–		8	–	1	–	0
No. 19 Princeton		–		8	–	1	–	0
Franklin & Marshall		–		7	–	1	–	0
Villanova		–		7	–	1	–	1
Holy Cross		–		8	–	2	–	0
Yale		–		7	–	2	–	0
Penn State		–		7	–	2	–	1
No. 14 Syracuse		–		7	–	3	–	0
Bucknell		–		6	–	3	–	0
Colgate		–		6	–	3	–	0
Pittsburgh		–		6	–	3	–	0
Carnegie Tech		–		4	–	3	–	0
Harvard		–		5	–	4	–	0
Boston University		–		5	–	4	–	1
Penn		–		4	–	3	–	2
Army		–		4	–	4	–	1
Boston College		–		4	–	4	–	1
Tufts		–		3	–	4	–	1
Drexel		–		3	–	4	–	0
Fordham		–		2	–	5	–	1
NYU		–		2	–	5	–	1
Columbia		–		2	–	6	–	1
Brown		–		2	–	7	–	0
Cornell		–		2	–	7	–	0
Dartmouth		–		2	–	7	–	0
Temple		–		2	–	7	–	1
Buffalo		–		1	–	7	–	0
Rankings from AP Poll

The 1952 Colgate Red Raiders football team was an American football team that represented Colgate University as an independent during the 1952 college football season. In its first season under head coach Hal Lahar, the team compiled a 6–3 record and outscored opponents by a total of 195 to 107. Donald Main was the team captain. The team played its home games at Colgate Athletic Field in Hamilton, New York.

== Schedule ==
Date	Opponent	Site	Result	Attendance	Source
September 27	at Cornell	Schoellkopf Field; Ithaca, NY (rivalry)	W 14–7	14,000	
October 4	at Buffalo	Civic Stadium; Buffalo, NY	W 13–0	11,000	
October 11	Rutgers	Colgate Athletic Field; Hamilton, NY	W 13–7	6,000	
October 18	at Harvard	Harvard Stadium; Boston, MA	L 20–21	14,000	
October 25	at Bucknell	Memorial Stadium; Lewisburg, PA	W 28–0	12,000	
November 1	Mississippi College	Colgate Athletic Field; Hamilton, NY	W 53–12	5,000	
November 8	at No. 20 Holy Cross	Fitton Field; Worcester, MA	L 7–13	10,000	
November 15	at No. 13 Syracuse	Archbold Stadium; Syracuse, NY (rivalry)	L 14–20	38,000	
November 27	at Brown	Brown Stadium; Providence, RI	W 33–27	7,000	
Rankings from AP Poll released prior to the game
