= 1952 Fordham Rams football team =

American college football season

1952 Fordham Rams football
- Conference: Independent
- Record: 2–5–1
- Head coach: Ed Danowski (7th season)
- Home stadium: Triborough Stadium

1952 Eastern college football independents records
	Conf.			Overall
Team	W	L	T	W		L		T
Rochester		–		8	–	0	–	0
Hofstra		–		8	–	1	–	0
No. 19 Princeton		–		8	–	1	–	0
Franklin & Marshall		–		7	–	1	–	0
Villanova		–		7	–	1	–	1
Holy Cross		–		8	–	2	–	0
Yale		–		7	–	2	–	0
Penn State		–		7	–	2	–	1
No. 14 Syracuse		–		7	–	3	–	0
Bucknell		–		6	–	3	–	0
Colgate		–		6	–	3	–	0
Pittsburgh		–		6	–	3	–	0
Carnegie Tech		–		4	–	3	–	0
Harvard		–		5	–	4	–	0
Boston University		–		5	–	4	–	1
Penn		–		4	–	3	–	2
Army		–		4	–	4	–	1
Boston College		–		4	–	4	–	1
Tufts		–		3	–	4	–	1
Drexel		–		3	–	4	–	0
Fordham		–		2	–	5	–	1
NYU		–		2	–	5	–	1
Columbia		–		2	–	6	–	1
Brown		–		2	–	7	–	0
Cornell		–		2	–	7	–	0
Dartmouth		–		2	–	7	–	0
Temple		–		2	–	7	–	1
Buffalo		–		1	–	7	–	0
Rankings from AP Poll

The 1952 Fordham Rams football team represented Fordham University as an independent during the 1952 college football season. The Rams went 2–5–1 and amassed 151 points while their defense allowed 119 points.

== Schedule ==
Date	Opponent	Site	Result	Attendance	Source
October 4	at Holy Cross	Fitton Field; Worcester, MA	L 7–12	21,895	
October 18	Quantico Marines	Triborough Stadium; New York, NY	L 8–21	5,000	
October 24	at Boston College	Braves Field; Boston, MA	L 13–14	13,991	
November 1	Detroit	Triborough Stadium; New York, NY	L 20–28	6,033	
November 8	Clemson	Triborough Stadium; New York, NY	T 12–12	6,000	
November 15	at Temple	Temple Stadium; Philadelphia, PA	W 33–6	500	
November 22	Syracuse	Triborough Stadium; New York, NY	L 13–26	10,000	
November 29	vs. NYU	Triborough Stadium; New York, NY	W 45–0	10,000	
