= 1952 Boston College Eagles football team =

American college football season

1952 Boston College Eagles football
- Conference: Independent
- Record: 4–4–1
- Head coach: Mike Holovak (2nd season)
- Captain: John Toppa
- Home stadium: Braves Field

1952 Eastern college football independents records
	Conf.			Overall
Team	W	L	T	W		L		T
Rochester		–		8	–	0	–	0
Hofstra		–		8	–	1	–	0
No. 19 Princeton		–		8	–	1	–	0
Franklin & Marshall		–		7	–	1	–	0
Villanova		–		7	–	1	–	1
Holy Cross		–		8	–	2	–	0
Yale		–		7	–	2	–	0
Penn State		–		7	–	2	–	1
No. 14 Syracuse		–		7	–	3	–	0
Bucknell		–		6	–	3	–	0
Colgate		–		6	–	3	–	0
Pittsburgh		–		6	–	3	–	0
Carnegie Tech		–		4	–	3	–	0
Harvard		–		5	–	4	–	0
Boston University		–		5	–	4	–	1
Penn		–		4	–	3	–	2
Army		–		4	–	4	–	1
Boston College		–		4	–	4	–	1
Tufts		–		3	–	4	–	1
Drexel		–		3	–	4	–	0
Fordham		–		2	–	5	–	1
NYU		–		2	–	5	–	1
Columbia		–		2	–	6	–	1
Brown		–		2	–	7	–	0
Cornell		–		2	–	7	–	0
Dartmouth		–		2	–	7	–	0
Temple		–		2	–	7	–	1
Buffalo		–		1	–	7	–	0
Rankings from AP Poll

The 1952 Boston College Eagles football team represented Boston College as an independent during the 1952 college football season. Led by second-year head coach Mike Holovak, the Eagles compiled a record of 4–4–1. Boston College played home games at Braves Field in Boston, Massachusetts.

== Schedule ==
Date	Time	Opponent	Site	Result	Attendance	Source
September 26		Richmond	Braves Field; Boston, MA	W 14–7	13,413	
October 4		vs. Wake Forest	Bowman Gray Stadium; Winston-Salem, NC	T 7–7	11,000	
October 10	8:30 p.m.	Drake	Braves Field; Boston, MA	W 20–14	13,628	
October 17		No. 15 Villanova	Braves Field; Boston, MA	L 7–28	23,415	
October 24		Fordham	Braves Field; Boston, MA	W 14–13	13,991	
October 31		Clemson	Braves Field; Boston, MA (rivalry)	L 0–13	10,040	
November 7		at Detroit	University of Detroit Stadium; Detroit, MI	W 23–20	12,280	
November 15		Xavier	Braves Field; Boston, MA	L 0–6	6,640	
November 28		Holy Cross	Braves Field; Boston, MA (rivalry)	L 7–21	37,889	
Rankings from AP Poll released prior to the game; All times are in Eastern time
