= 1952 Maine Black Bears football team =

American college football season

1952 Maine Black Bears football

Yankee Conference co-champion
- Conference: Yankee Conference, Maine Intercollegiate Athletic Association
- Record: 4–3 (3–1 Yankee, 1–2 MIAA)
- Head coach: Harold Westerman (2nd season)
- Captains: John Butterfield; Phil Butterfield Jr.
- Home stadium: Alumni Field

1952 Yankee Conference football standings
	Conf.					Overall
Team	W		L		T	W		L		T
Connecticut +	3	–	1	–	0	5	–	3	–	0
Maine +	3	–	1	–	0	4	–	3	–	0
Rhode Island +	3	–	1	–	0	7	–	1	–	0
UMass	1	–	2	–	0	4	–	3	–	1
Vermont	0	–	1	–	0	2	–	5	–	0
New Hampshire	0	–	4	–	0	2	–	4	–	1
+ – Conference co-champions

The 1952 Maine Black Bears football team was an American football team that represented the University of Maine as a member of the Yankee Conference and Maine Intercollegiate Athletic Association during the 1952 college football season. In its second season under head coach Harold Westerman, the team compiled a 4–3 record (3–1 against Yankee Conference and 1–2 against MIAA opponents) and finished in a three-way tie for the Yankee Conference championship. The team played its home games at Alumni Field in Orono, Maine. John Butterfield and Phil Butterfield, Jr., were the team captains.

== Schedule ==
Date	Opponent	Site	Result	Attendance	Source
September 27	Rhode Island	Alumni Field; Orono, ME	W 13–0		
October 4	at Vermont	Centennial Field; Burlington, VT	W 14–6	5,000	
October 11	New Hampshire	Alumni Field; Orono, ME (rivalry)	W 24–7		
October 18	at Connecticut	Memorial Stadium; Storrs, CT	L 7–13		
October 25	Bates	Alumni Field; Orono, ME	W 62–6		
November 1	Colby	Alumni Field; Orono, ME	L 7–13		
November 8	at Bowdoin	Whittier Field; Brunswick, ME	L 14–33	11,000	
