= 1952 Pittsburgh Panthers football team =

American college football season

1952 Pittsburgh Panthers football
- Conference: Independent

Ranking
- Coaches: No. 15
- Record: 6–3
- Head coach: Red Dawson (1st season)
- Home stadium: Pitt Stadium

1952 Eastern college football independents records
	Conf.			Overall
Team	W	L	T	W		L		T
Rochester		–		8	–	0	–	0
Hofstra		–		8	–	1	–	0
No. 19 Princeton		–		8	–	1	–	0
Franklin & Marshall		–		7	–	1	–	0
Villanova		–		7	–	1	–	1
Holy Cross		–		8	–	2	–	0
Yale		–		7	–	2	–	0
Penn State		–		7	–	2	–	1
No. 14 Syracuse		–		7	–	3	–	0
Bucknell		–		6	–	3	–	0
Colgate		–		6	–	3	–	0
Pittsburgh		–		6	–	3	–	0
Carnegie Tech		–		4	–	3	–	0
Harvard		–		5	–	4	–	0
Boston University		–		5	–	4	–	1
Penn		–		4	–	3	–	2
Army		–		4	–	4	–	1
Boston College		–		4	–	4	–	1
Tufts		–		3	–	4	–	1
Drexel		–		3	–	4	–	0
Fordham		–		2	–	5	–	1
NYU		–		2	–	5	–	1
Columbia		–		2	–	6	–	1
Brown		–		2	–	7	–	0
Cornell		–		2	–	7	–	0
Dartmouth		–		2	–	7	–	0
Temple		–		2	–	7	–	1
Buffalo		–		1	–	7	–	0
Rankings from AP Poll

The 1952 Pittsburgh Panthers football team represented the University of Pittsburgh as an independent during the 1952 college football season. The team compiled a 6–3 record under head coach Red Dawson.

== Schedule ==
Date	Opponent	Rank	Site	Result	Attendance	Source
September 27	Iowa		Pitt Stadium; Pittsburgh, PA	W 26–14	24,490	
October 4	at No. 20 Oklahoma		Oklahoma Memorial Stadium; Norman, OK	L 20–49	37,716–38,000	
October 11	at No. 8 Notre Dame		Notre Dame Stadium; Notre Dame, IN (rivalry)	W 22–19	45,503	
October 18	at Army		Michie Stadium; West Point, NY	W 22–14	18,850	
October 25	West Virginia	No. 18	Pitt Stadium; Pittsburgh, PA (rivalry)	L 0–16	28,532	
November 1	Indiana		Pitt Stadium; Pittsburgh, PA	W 28–7	19,907	
November 8	at Ohio State		Ohio Stadium; Columbus, OH	W 21–14	75,120	
November 15	NC State	No. 14	Pitt Stadium; Pittsburgh, PA	W 48–6	12,000	
November 22	Penn State	No. 16	Pitt Stadium; Pittsburgh, PA (rivalry)	L 0–17	53,766	
Rankings from AP Poll released prior to the game

== Preseason ==
On January 14, 1952, Lowell (Red) Dawson became the twenty-second head football coach (and fourth in the past four years) of the Pittsburgh Panthers. He came from Michigan State, where he was the offensive coach on Clarence Munn's 1951, #2-ranked Spartans, staff. Pitt signed Dawson to a 3-year contract.

Coach Dawson retained Coach Hamilton's assistants for his staff – Bob Timmons, Ernie Hefferle, Edgar Jones, Steve Petro and Walt Cummins. On February 15, Dawson hired Harold Lahar, who had been the defensive line coach at West Virginia. On March 26, Lahar was appointed head coach at Colgate University. On June 14, Dawson completed his staff with the hiring of former Steelers head coach, John Michelosen and former Temple assistant, Bob Friedlund.

March 31 was the first day of 20 spring practice sessions allowed by the NCAA. Close to 70 hopefuls vied for spots on the varsity squad. The Panthers took a short break for Easter, then finished on May 3, with a high school coaches' football clinic, a track meet against Notre Dame and scrimmage game between the varsity and an alumni team. 350 high school and college coaches attended the clinic. Pitt beat Notre Dame in the track meet 71–60 and the varsity beat the old-timers 34–7. 2,500 fans enjoyed the festivities.

On September 3, Coach Dawson welcomed 44 candidates (22 lettermen) to the fall two-a-day practice sessions. On September 13, the Panthers traveled to Columbia, N.J. to scrimmage against the Rutgers eleven. Quarterback Rudy Mattioli and halfback Paul Chess stood out on offense, while Joe Schmidt led the defense.

== Coaching staff ==
1952 Pittsburgh Panthers football staff
Coaching staff: Lowell Dawson – head coach; Bob Friedlund – defensive line coach; John Michelosen – defensive coach; Edgar Jones – backfield coach; Bob Timmons – backfield coach; Ernie Hefferle – offensive line coach; Steve Petro – jayvee coach; Walter Cummins– freshman coach	Support staff: Thomas J. Hamilton – director of athletics and physical education; Frank Carver – graduate manager; Bill Heyman – publicity director; Dr. Ralph Shanor – team physician; Dr. Dan Dickinson – team physician; Howard Waite – trainer; Bill Haines – equipment manager; Russell McBride– student manager

== Roster ==
1952 Pittsburgh Panthers football roster
Player	Position	Games	Weight	Height	Class	Prep School	Hometown
Bob Wrabley*	defensive halfback	9	170	5 ft 10 in	sophomore	Central Catholic H. S.	Pittsburgh, PA
Henry Ford *	quarterback	9	180	5 ft 10 in	sophomore	Schenley H. S.	Pittsburgh, PA
Rudy Mattioli*	quarterback	9	190	6 ft 1 in	sophomore	Har-Brack H. S./Univ. of Kentucky	Har-Brack, PA
Pete Neft*	quarterback	8	180	6 ft 1 in	freshman	Peabody H. S.	Pittsburgh, PA
Ray Ferguson*	left halfback	8	185	5 ft 10 in	junior	Jersey Shore Area H. S.	Jersey Shore
Richie McCabe*	defensive halfback	7	170	6 ft	sophomore	North Catholic H. S.	Pittsburgh, PA
Bobbie Ingram	defensive halfback	1	170	5 ft 10 in	junior	St. Mary's H. S.	St. Mary's, WV
Chester Rice*	defensive halfback	9	175	5 ft 10 in	sophomore	Derry Twp. High School	Derry Township, PA
John Jacobs*	halfback	7	195	5 ft 11 in	sophomore	Georges Twp. H. S.	Georges Twp., PA
William Reynolds*	right halfback	9	190	5 ft 10 in	senior	St. Mary's H. S.	St. Mary's, WV
Paul Mikanic	right halfback	0	180	5 ft 6 in	sophomore	Follansbee H. S.	Follansbee, WV
Joseph Capp	fullback	2	195	5 ft 11 in	senior	Newton Falls H. S.	Newton Falls, OH
Bill Hoffman*	quarterback	7	190	5 ft 10 in	sophomore	Greensburg H. S.	Greensburg, PA
Paul Chess*	fullback	8	195	6 ft	senior	Meadville H. S.	Meadville, PA
Paul Blanda*	linebacker	8	190	6 ft	sophomore	Youngwood H. S.	Youngwood, PA
Mike Omatick	linebacker	0	185	5 ft 10 in	junior	Connellsville H. S.	Connellsville, PA
Bobby Epps*	fullback	9	195	5 ft 8 in	junior	Swissvale H. S.	Swissvale, PA
Gabe Gembarosky*	center	9	200	5 ft 11 in	senior	Donora H. S.	Donora, PA
Bob Ballock	center	0	190	6 ft	sophomore	Farrell H. S.	Farrell, PA
John Cenci	linebacker	3	190	5 ft 10 in	freshman	Schenley H. S.	Pittsburgh, PA
Donald Schlick	center	1	195	6 ft	freshman	Wheeling H. S.	Wheeling, WV
Anthony Romantino*	guard	9	175	5 ft 10 in	senior	Donora H. S.	Donora, PA
Dick Gatz*	guard	8	190	6 ft	junior	Carnegie H. S.	Carnegie, PA
Francis Baron	guard	2	190	6 ft	senior	Nanticoke H. S.	Nanticoke, PA
Joseph Schmidt*	linebacker	7	205	6 ft	senior	Brentwood H. S.	Brentwood, PA
Merle DeLuca*	guard	8	200	5 ft 10 in	senior	Westinghouse H. S.	Pittsburgh, PA
Eldred Kraemer*	tackle	9	210	6 ft 3 in	sophomore	Clear Lake H. S.	Clear Lake, MN
William Schmitt*	tackle	6	215	6 ft 1 in	freshman	South Hills H. S.	Pittsburgh, PA
Alfred Smalara*	guard	8	195	6 ft	senior	Springdale H. S.	Springdale, PA
Stuart Kline*	center	9	210	6 ft	senior	Johnstown H. S.	Johnstown, PA
William Priatko*	guard	8	210	6 ft 1 in	junior	North Braddock H. S.	North Braddock, PA
Neil Huffman	tackle	0	220	6 ft 2 in	senior	Ostrander H. S.	Ostrander, OH
William Cessar*	tackle	9	205	6 ft 2 in	freshman	Millvale H. S.	Millvale, PA
Eugene Dolfi	tackle	0	200	6 ft 1 in	senior	Rostraver Twp. H. S.	Rostraver Twp., PA
Joseph Bozek*	end	9	190	6 ft 2 in	senior	Rochester H. S.	Conway, PA
Bob Kennedy*	end	7	185	5 ft 11 in	sophomore	Williamsport H. S.	Williamsport, PA
Ken Voytell*	end	8	200	6 ft 1 in	junior	Clairton H. S./ St. Bonaventure U.	Clairton, PA
George Glagola*	end	9	195	6 ft 1 in	senior	German Township H. S.	McClellandtown, PA
Joe Zombek*	left end	9	185	6 ft	sophomore	Carnegie H. S.	Carnegie, PA
Robert McQuaide*	right end	8	180	6 ft 1 in	freshman	Indiana H. S.	Indiana, PA
Bill Adams*	end	9	185	6 ft 2 in	sophomore	Oakmont H. S.	Oakmont, PA
Glenn Dillon*	left end	7	185	6 ft	sophomore	Titusville H. S.	Titusville, PA
Richard Deitrick*	end	8	215	6 ft 3 in	junior	Danville H. S.	Danville, PA
Louis Palatella*	tackle	9	225	6 ft 1 in	sophomore	Vandergrift H.S.	Vandergrift, PA
* Lettermen

== Game summaries ==
=== Iowa ===
Week 1: Iowa at Pitt

Team	1	2	3	4	Total
Iowa	7	0	7	0	14
• Pitt	0	13	7	6	26

- Date: September 27, 1952
- Location: Pitt Stadium
  Pittsburgh, PA
- Game start: 2:00 p.m.
- Game attendance: 24,490
- Game weather: fair and cool
- Referee: C. A. Wertz (Ohio Wesleyan)

Scoring summary
1	IOWA	Jim Milani 6-yard run (Jerry White kick)	IOWA 7–0
2	PITT	Bobby Epps 5-yard run (Paul Blanda kick)	TIED 7–7
2	PITT	Rudy Mattioli 1-yard run ( kick missed)	PITT 13–7
3	IOWA	Milani 54-yard run (White kick )	IOWA 14–13
3	PITT	Epps 54-yard pass from Mattioli (Bob Wrabley kick )	PITT 20–14
4	PITT	John Jacobs 14-yard pass from Mattioli ( kick missed )	PITT 26–14

First-year coach Red Dawson's Panthers opened the season against first-year coach Forest Evashevski's Iowa Hawkeyes. The Panthers had not beaten a Big Ten team (0–8), or won a season opener since 1949. However, Pitt did finish the 1951 season on a three-game win streak, and were favored by 6 points over the Hawkeyes. The all-time series was tied at one win apiece.

In front of 24,940 fans, Pitt ran its win streak to four games by beating the Hawkeyes 26–14. Iowa recovered a Pitt fumble on the Panthers 30-yard line on the first play from scrimmage. Seven plays advanced the ball to the 6-yard line. Halfback Jim Milani ran around end for the score. Jim White added the point and Iowa led 7–0 at the end of the first quarter. After a 75-yard drive, the Panthers tied the score on a Bobby Epps 5-yard run and Paul Blanda conversion. The Panther offense regained possession on their 38-yard line. The ensuing 61-yard drive culminated with a quarterback sneak from the 1-yard line by Rudy Mattioli. Blanda's kick was good, but the Panthers were penalized for illegal use of hands. His second try was unsuccessful and Pitt led 13–7 at halftime. Iowa received the second half kickoff. On the third play, Milani raced 54 yards around end for his second touchdown of the game. Jim White's kick put Iowa back in front 14–13. Late in the third period, Bobby Epps caught a screen pass from Mattioli and ran 54 yards for a Pitt touchdown. Bob Wrabley added the extra point and Pitt led 20–14. The Pitt defense forced Iowa to punt from their 7-yard line. Panther running back Billy Reynolds returned the punt to the Iowa 36-yard line. Six plays later, John Jacobs caught a 14-yard pass from Mattioli for the final score of the game.

The starting lineup for Pitt against Iowa was Bill Adams (left end), Lou Palatella (left tackle), Merle DeLuca (left guard), Gabe Gembarosky (center), Albert Smalara (right guard), Eldred Kraemer (right tackle), Dick Deitrick (right end), Rudy Mattioli (quarterback), Bill Hoffman (left halfback), Billy Reynolds (right halfback) and Bobby Epps (fullback). The following substitutes appeared in the game for Pitt: Joe Bozek, Joe Zombek, Robert Kennedy, Robert McQuaide, Glen Dillon, William Cessar, Anthony Romantino, Joe Schmidt, Bill Priatko, Richard Gatz, George Glagola, Stuart Kline, John Censi, Ray Ferguson, Paul Blanda, Henry Ford, Chester Rice, Robert Wrabley, Joe Capp, John Jacobs and Paul Chess.

=== at Oklahoma ===
Week 2: Pitt at Oklahoma

Team	1	2	3	4	Total
Pitt	0	13	0	7	20
• Oklahoma	14	7	14	14	49

- Date: October 4, 1952
- Location: Oklahoma Memorial Stadium
  Norman, OK
- Game start: 2:00 pm CST
- Game attendance: 37,716
- Game weather: hot (85 degrees)
- Referee: Ronald Gibbs (St. Thomas)

Scoring summary
1	OKLA	Buddy Leake 1-yard run (Leake kick)	OKLA 7–0
1	OKLA	Leake 3-yard run ( Leake kick)	OKLA 14–0
2	OKLA	Carl Allison 23-yard pass from Leake (Leake kick)	OKLA 21–0
2	PITT	Bobby Epps 4-yard run (Bob Kennedy kick )	OKLA 21–7
2	PITT	Pete Neft 7-yard run ( kick missed )	OKLA 21–13
3	OKLA	Buck McPhail 14-yard run (Leake kick)	OKLA 28–13
3	OKLA	Dick Ellis 45-yard punt return ( Leake kick)	OKLA 35–13
4	OKLA	Eddie Crowder 5-yard run (Leake kick )	OKLA 42–13
4	OKLA	Merrill Green 7-yard run (Leake kick )	OKLA 49–13
4	PITT	Bobby Reynolds 1-yard run ( Kennedy kick )	OKLA 49–20

The second game of the season was in Norman, OK against the Oklahoma Sooners. Oklahoma was the defending Big 7 Conference champion, and was on a 21-game home field win streak. Coach Bud Wilkinson had 5 All-Americans ( Heisman Trophy winner Billy Vessels, Buck McPhail, Eddie Crowder, Buddy Leake and Tom Catlin), among the 33 lettermen on his roster.

The 36-member Panthers squad flew via a chartered plane into Oklahoma City and housed at the Biltmore Hotel. Linebackers Joe Schmidt and Paul Blanda were injured in the Iowa game, and Coach Dawson replaced them with George Glagola and Dick Gatz.

The favored Sooners beat the Panthers 49–20 to extend their home win streak to 22 games. Pitt played well in the first half, and only trailed 21–13 at the break. In the second half, the Sooners added four touchdowns before the Panthers answered with their final score. Bobby Epps, Billy Reynolds and Pete Neft scored touchdowns for the Panthers. Bob Kennedy added two extra points. Six Sooners scored touchdowns. Buddy Leake scored two, and threw a touchdown pass to Carl Allison for a third. He also kicked 6 extra points. Buck McPhail, Dick Ellis, Merrill Green and Eddie Crowder contributed one touchdown apiece.

The Pitt starting lineup for the game against Oklahoma was Bill Adams (left end), Lou Palatella (left tackle), Merle DeLuca (left guard), Gabe Gembarosky (center), Albert Smalara (right guard), Eldred Kraemer (right tackle), Dick Deitrick (right end), Rudy Mattioli (quarterback), Bill Hoffman (left halfback), Billy Reynolds (right halfback) and Bobby Epps (fullback). Substitutes appearing in the game for Pitt were Glen Dillon, Joe Zombek, George Glagola, Robert Kennedy, William Schmitt, Bill Priatko, Stuart Kline, Tony Romantino, Francis Baron, Dick Gatz, William Cessar, Bob McQuaide, Joe Bozek, Ken Voytell, Pete Neft, Henry Ford, John Jacobs, Chester Rice, Ray Ferguson, Bob Wrabley, Paul Chess and Joe Capp.

=== at Notre Dame ===
Week 3: Pitt at Notre Dame

Team	1	2	3	4	Total
• Pitt	13	0	7	2	22
Notre Dame	0	0	13	6	19

- Date: October 11, 1952
- Location: Notre Dame Stadium
  Notre Dame, IN
- Game start: 2:00 p.m.
- Game attendance: 45,503
- Game weather: partly cloudy and warm
- Referee: Russel Rupp (Lebanon Valley)

Scoring summary
1	PITT	Bobby Reynolds 79-yard run (kick missed)	PITT 6–0
1	PITT	John Jacobs 63-yard pass from Rudy Mattioli (Paul Blanda kick)	PITT 13–0
3	ND	Neil Worden 11-yard run (kick missed)	PITT 13–6
3	PITT	Mattioli 1-yard run (Blanda kick )	PITT 20–6
3	ND	Ralph Guglielmi 1-yard run ( Menil Mavraides kick )	PITT 20–13
3	ND	Joe Heap 92-yard punt return ( kick missed)	PITT 20–19
4	PITT	Joe Zombek tackled Guglielmi in the end zone for a safety	PITT 22–19

On October 11, the Panthers played the #8-ranked Notre Dame Fighting Irish in South Bend. The Panthers had lost 8 straight games to the Irish since 1937, and were held to a total of 22 points. Notre Dame led the all-time series 13–5–1. Coach Leahy's squad was 1–0–1 on the season, after tying #12 Penn and beating #5 Texas. Halfback Johnny Lattner and Bob O'Neil, received All-American honors.

The 14-point underdog Panthers flew into South Bend, and practiced on the Notre Dame field before headquartering in Elkhart until game time. Coach Dawson welcomed the return of defensive starters Joe Schmidt, Paul Blanda and Rich McCabe to the lineup.

The Pittsburgh Sun-Telegraph and the Pennsylvania Railroad took 1,000 Pitt fans to South Bend. The $26.75 train ticket package included a game ticket, breakfast going and dinner on the ride home. 350 Sun-Telegraph paper boys made the trip.

In front of 45,503 stunned fans, the Pitt Panthers beat the Fighting Irish 22–19. The second time the Panthers gained possession, Rudy Mattioli handed the ball to Bill Reynolds, and he raced 78 yards for the first touchdown. Paul Blanda's extra point was wide and Pitt led 6–0. After an exchange of possessions the Panthers had the ball on their 37-yard line. Mattioli threw a 63-yard touchdown pass to John Jacobs and Blanda added the extra point. Pitt led 13–0 at halftime. The Irish received the second half kickoff and drove 79 yards for their first score. Neil Worden ran in from the 11 yard line. Menil Mavraides missed the placement. (Pitt 13–6) The Panthers offense answered with a 48-yard march of their own. Mattioli got the touchdown on a quarterback sneak, and Blanda added the point for a 20–6 lead. Irish quarterback Ralph Guglielmi then capped a 75-yard drive with a 1-yard plunge. Mavraides converted and Pitt led 20–13. In the fourth quarter, Irish halfback Joe Heap returned a punt 92 yards to cut the lead to 20–19. Mavraides converted the placement, but the Irish were flagged for holding. The center snap was fumbled on the second try and Pitt led by 1 point. With less than a minute to play, Guglielmi dropped back to pass and Joe Bozek tackled him in the end zone for a safety.

Pitt out gained Notre Dame - 370 total yards to 293 yards. Pitt halfback Billy Reynolds had 169 yards rushing, while the Notre Dame team totaled 162 yards rushing.

The Pitt starting lineup for the game against Notre Dame was Bill Adams (left end), Lou Palatella (left tackle), Merle DeLuca (left guard), Gabe Gembarosky (center), Albert Smalara (right guard), Eldred Kraemer (right tackle), Dick Deitrick (right end), Rudy Mattioli (quarterback), Bill Hoffman (left halfback), Billy Reynolds (right halfback) and Bobby Epps (fullback). Substitutes appearing in the game for Pitt were Glen Dillon, Joe Zombek, George Glagola, Robert Kennedy, William Schmitt, Bill Priatko, Stuart Kline, Joe Schmidt, Tony Romantino, Dick Gatz, William Cessar, Bob McQuaide, Joe Bozek, Ken Voytell, Pete Neft, Henry Ford, John Jacobs, Chester Rice, Ray Ferguson, Bob Wrabley, Paul Chess and Richie McCabe.

=== at Army ===
Week 4: Pitt at Army

Team	1	2	3	4	Total
• Pitt	7	9	6	0	22
Army	0	0	0	14	14

- Date: October 18, 1952
- Location: Michie Stadium
  West Point, NY
- Game start: 2:00 p.m.
- Game attendance: 18,850
- Game weather: cold
- Referee: Paul N. Swaffield (Brown)

Scoring summary
1	PITT	Paul Chess 14-yard run (Paul Blanda kick)	PITT 7–0
2	PITT	Chess 8-yard run (Blanda kick)	PITT 14–0
2	PITT	Joe Zombek tackled Fred Attaya in the end zone for a safety	PITT 16–0
3	PITT	Bill Reynolds 27-yard run (kick missed)	PITT 22–0
3	ARMY	Mario Delucia 1-yard run (Rex Shain kick )	PITT 20–6
4	ARMY	Mario DeLucia 1-yard run (Shain kick)	PITT 22–14

For their third road game in a row, the Panthers flew in two All-American chartered planes to West Point, NY to play the Army Cadets. Pitt led the all-time series 3–1, but the teams had not played since 1944. Coach Earl “Red” Blaik's Cadets were 2–1, after beating South Carolina and Dartmouth and losing to USC.

Pittsburgh captain Joe Schmidt (concussion), halfback Bill Hoffman (leg) and fullback Joe Capp (back) were not available for action. Fullback Bobby Epps and lineman Bill Priatko were nursing leg injuries, but made the trip. Coach Dawson put Paul Chess at fullback, John Jacobs at left halfback and Ken Voytell at middle linebacker.

The Pitt Panthers improved their record to 3–1 with a 22–14 victory over the Army Cadets. The Panthers built a commanding 22–0 lead after three quarters. They scored on drives of 80, 63, and 73 yards plus a safety. Substitute fullback Paul Chess scored 2 touchdowns and Bill Reynolds added one. End Joe Zombek tackled Army halfback Fred Attaya in the end zone for the safety, and Paul Blanda was good on 2 of 3 conversion attempts. The Army offense answered with two fourth quarter touchdowns by Mario DeLucia, and Rex Shain converted both extra points.

A bus trip to West Point for the game, sponsored by The Pitt News and Student Congress, drew 1000 students and alums. The busses left Friday night and arrived at West Point 9 a.m. Saturday morning. The attendees toured the campus and watched the Army Cadets drill prior to kick-off. After the game, the students were able to spend 5 hours in New York City before bussing back to Pittsburgh.

Coach Dawson was named "Coach of the Week" by the United Press sportswriters after the Army victory. He told The Pitt News: “That's what comes of having a good coaching staff and a fine bunch of boys, I guess.”

The Pitt starting lineup for the game against Army was Bill Adams (left end), Lou Palatella (left tackle), Merle DeLuca (left guard), Gabe Gembarosky (center), Albert Smalara (right guard), Eldred Kraemer (right tackle), Dick Deitrick (right end), Rudy Mattioli (quarterback), John Jacobs (left halfback), Billy Reynolds (right halfback) and Paul Chess (fullback). Substitutes appearing in the game for Pitt were Glen Dillon, Joe Zombek, George Glagola, Robert Kennedy, William Schmitt, Bill Priatko, Stuart Kline, Tony Romantino, Dick Gatz, William Cessar, Bob McQuaide, Joe Bozek, Ken Voytell, Pete Neft, Henry Ford, John Jacobs, Bobby Epps, Paul Blanda, Chester Rice, Ray Ferguson, Bob Wrabley, Paul Chess and Richie McCabe.

=== West Virginia ===
Week 5: West Virginia at Pitt

Team	1	2	3	4	Total
• West Virginia	0	7	3	6	16
Pitt	0	0	0	0	0

- Date: October 25, 1952
- Location: Pitt Stadium
  Pittsburgh, PA
- Game start: 2:00 p.m.
- Game attendance: 28,532
- Game weather: fair and cool
- Referee: John H. Coles (Westminster)

Scoring summary
2	WVU	Paul Bischoff 23-yard pass from Fred Wyant (Jack Stone kick)	WVU 7–0
3	WVU	Stone 16-yard field goal	WVU 10–0
4	WVU	Wyant 1-yard run ( kick missed)	WVU 16–0

The fifth game of the season was the annual Backyard Brawl against the West Virginia Mountaineers, who were 2–2 on the season. The Mountaineers were without halfback Eddie Dugan, their number two leading rusher.

Pitt who led the all-time series 34–9–1 was a three touchdown favorite. Coach Dawson switched halfbacks Henry Ford and Bob Wrabley to offense to replace the injured John Jacobs and Bill Hoffman. Linebacker Joe Schmidt was still not available.

This game was designated “High School Day” and all high schoolers could purchase tickets for the reduced price of sixty-five cents. At halftime Chandler Ketchum, president of the Pittsburgh Junior Chamber of Commerce, presented Pitt Athletic Director Tom Hamilton the Tri-State Big Three football championship trophy for the 1952 season (having beaten both West Virginia and Penn State). The trophy, known as Old Ironsides, was a 95-pound stainless steel ingot.

The Mountaineers outplayed the heavily favored Panthers and won their tenth game in the series 16–0. After a scoreless first period, the Mountaineers offense scored in each of the final three quarters, while their defense kept the Panthers out of the end zone. In the second quarter, Fred Wyant threw a 23-yard pass to Paul Bischoff for the first touchdown, and in the final period he scored on a quarterback sneak. Jack Stone converted one extra point and added a field goal in the third quarter. The Panthers were held to 161 yards of offense. They only completed 9 of 31 passes and had 2 intercepted.

Coach Dawson told the Pittsburgh Sun-Telegraph: “We deserved to lose. They were all of 16 points better today. We were flat and you never do much when you're flat. We really had our bad day.”

The Pitt starting lineup for the game against West Virginia was Bill Adams (left end), Lou Palatella (left tackle), Merle DeLuca (left guard), Gabe Gembarosky (center), Tony Romantino (right guard), Eldred Kraemer (right tackle), Dick Deitrick (right end), Rudy Mattioli (quarterback), Henry Ford (left halfback), Billy Reynolds (right halfback) and Paul Chess (fullback). Substitutes appearing in the game for Pitt were Albert Smalara, Joe Zombek, Bill Priatko, Stuart Kline, Dick Gatz, William Cessar, Bob McQuaide, Joe Bozek, Ken Voytell, George Glagola, Pete Neft, Bobby Epps, Paul Blanda, Chester Rice, Ray Ferguson, Bob Wrabley and Richie McCabe.

=== Indiana ===
Week 6: Indiana at Pitt

Team	1	2	3	4	Total
Indiana	0	7	0	0	7
• Pitt	7	14	7	0	28

- Date: November 1, 1952
- Location: Pitt Stadium
  Pittsburgh, PA
- Game start: 2:00 p.m.
- Game attendance: 19,907
- Game weather: fair and warm
- Referee: Charles Wertz (Ohio Wesleyan)

Scoring summary
1	PITT	Bill Hoffman 6-yard run (Paul Blanda kick)	PITT 7–0
2	PITT	Bobby Epps 55-yard run (Blanda kick)	PITT 14–0
2	IND	Gene Gedman 23-yard pass from Dick Ashburnere	PITT 14–7
2	PITT	Hoffman 8-yard run (Blanda kick)	PITT 21–7
3	PITT	Pete Neft 1-yard run ( Blanda kick)	PITT 28–7

On November 1, the Panthers welcomed the Indiana Hoosiers as their Homecoming opponent. First-year Coach Bernie Crimmins' squad was 2–3, and the Hoosiers led the all-time series 7–1. Pitt's lone victory was in 1948 (21–14).

Coach Dawson had linebacker Joe Schmidt and halfback Bill Hoffman back in the starting lineup. The Panthers were a touchdown favorite to avenge the previous year's loss.

In front of 19,907 Homecoming fans, Pitt bettered their win total of 1951 with a convincing 28–7 victory over the Indiana Hoosiers. In the first period, Pitt recovered a Hoosier fumble on the Indiana 22-yard line. On the third play, Hoffman skirted right end for the final 6 yards to the end zone. The Panthers scored twice in the second quarter. First, Bobby Epps raced 55 yards to complete an 80-yard drive. The Hoosiers answered with a touchdown pass from Dick Ashburner to Gene Gedman. Lou D'Achille added the point after. Then the Panthers marched 95 yards, with Hoffman going around right end from 8 yards to score. In the third quarter Pete Neft ended the Panther scoring with a 1-yard quarterback sneak. Paul Blanda was perfect on all placements. The Panthers and Hoosiers have not met again on the gridiron.

The Pitt starting lineup for the game against Indiana was Bill Adams (left end), Lou Palatella (left tackle), Merle DeLuca (left guard), Gabe Gembarosky (center), Tony Romantino (right guard), Eldred Kraemer (right tackle), Dick Deitrick (right end), Rudy Mattioli (quarterback), Bill Hoffman (left halfback), Billy Reynolds (right halfback) and Bobby Epps (fullback). Substitutes appearing in the game for Pitt were Bob Kennedy, William Schmitt, John Censi, Glen Dillon, Joe Schmidt, Albert Smalara, Joe Zombek, Bill Priatko, Stuart Kline, Dick Gatz, William Cessar, Bob McQuaide, Joe Bozek, Ken Voytell, George Glagola, Pete Neft, Paul Chess, Paul Blanda, Chester Rice, Ray Ferguson, Bob Wrabley and Richie McCabe.

=== at Ohio State ===
Week 7: Pitt at Ohio State

Team	1	2	3	4	Total
• Pitt	7	7	7	0	21
Ohio State	0	7	0	7	14

- Date: November 9, 1952
- Location: Ohio Stadium
  Columbus, OH
- Game start: 2:00 p.m.
- Game attendance: 75,120
- Game weather: clear and cold
- Referee: Russell Rupp (Lebanon Valley)

Scoring summary
1	PITT	Rudy Mattioli 3-yard run (Paul Blanda kick)	PITT 7–0
2	OSU	Bob Grimes 32-yard pass from John Borton (Tad Weed kick)	TIED 7–7
2	PITT	Bill Reynolds 10-yard pass from Bill Hoffman (Blanda kick)	PITT 14–7
3	PITT	Dick Dietrick 56-yard pass from Rudy Mattioli (Blanda kick)	PITT 21–7
4	OSU	Fred Bruney 21-yard pass from Borton (Weed kick)	PITT 21–14

The final road game of the season was against Woody Hayes' Ohio State Buckeyes. The Buckeyes were 4–2 for the season, and they led the all-time series 12–3–1. A Dad's Day crowd was expected to break the series attendance record of 74,743 set in 1946.

This was the third Big Ten opponent on the schedule, and Pitt was 2–0 against the first two. No Pitt team had ever beaten three Big Ten teams in one season. Coach Dawson's squad was healthy and wanted to avenge the 16–14 loss of the previous year. On Friday morning the Panthers and 4,000 fans rode the Pennsylvania Railroad to Columbus, OH. That afternoon the squad practiced on Ohio Stadium.

In front of a record 75,120 fans, the underdog Panthers beat the Ohio State Buckeyes 21–14. Pitt earned 11 first downs to Ohio's 22. Pitt gained 237 total yards to Ohio's 333. But Pitt scored three times and Ohio scored twice. The Panthers never trailed as they scored in the first quarter on a 31-yard drive thanks to a fumble by Howard Cassady. Rudy Mattioli scored on a quarterback sneak from the 2-yard line and Paul Blanda added the point after. Late in the second period, Ohio State tied the game on a 32-yard touchdown pass from John Borton to Bob Grimes. Ted Weed's placement tied the game. The Panthers answered less than four minutes later. They took the kick-off and drove 74 yards. With 37 seconds left in the half, Bill Hoffman tossed a 10-yard touchdown pass to Bill Reynolds and Blanda converted for a 14–7 halftime lead. Early in the third quarter, the Panthers gained possession on their 38-yard line. On third down Mattioli threw a 56-yard touchdown pass to Dick Deitrick and Blanda was good on the extra point. Pitt 21–7. Late in the final minutes Borton threw a 21-yard touchdown pass to Fred Bruney, and Ted Weed added the extra point to make the final score 21–14.

The Pitt fans stormed the field and tore down the goalpost on the north end of the field. Then, they turned to the south end of the field and were confronted by the Ohio State ROTC unit. The Pitt mob won the battle and tore down that goalpost too.

The Pitt starting lineup for the game against Ohio State was Bill Adams (left end), Lou Palatella (left tackle), Merle DeLuca (left guard), Gabe Gembarosky (center), Tony Romantino (right guard), Eldred Kraemer (right tackle), Dick Deitrick (right end), Rudy Mattioli (quarterback), Bill Hoffman (left halfback), Billy Reynolds (right halfback) and Bobby Epps (fullback). Substitutes appearing in the game for Pitt were William Schmitt, Bob Kennedy, Joe Schmidt, Albert Smalara, Joe Zombek, Bill Priatko, Stuart Kline, Dick Gatz, William Cessar, Joe Bozek, George Glagola, Pete Neft, Paul Chess, Paul Blanda, Chester Rice, Ray Ferguson, Bob Wrabley, John Jacobs and Richie McCabe.

=== NC State ===
Week 8: NC State at Pitt

Team	1	2	3	4	Total
NC State	0	0	6	0	6
• Pitt	14	13	14	7	48

- Date: November 15, 1952
- Location: Pitt Stadium
  Pittsburgh, PA
- Game start: 2:00 p.m.
- Game attendance: 12, 746
- Game weather: cloudy and warm
- Referee: Hugh B. Conrad

Scoring summary
1	PITT	Bobby Epps 19-yard run (Paul Blanda kick)	PITT 7–0
1	PITT	Bob Reynolds 1-yard run (Blanda kick)	PITT 14–0
2	PITT	John Jacobs 21-yard pass from Rudy Mattioli (Blanda kick)	PITT 21–0
2	PITT	Hoffman 26-yard pass from Pete Neft ( kick missed)	PITT 27–0
3	PITT	Hoffman 2-yard run ( Blanda kick)	PITT 34–0
3	PITT	Bill Reynolds 1-yard run (Blanda kick)	PITT 41–0
3	NCST	John Zubaty 13-yard pass from Eddie Frantz (kick missed)	PITT 41–6
4	PITT	Epps 5-yard run (Blanda kick)	PITT 48–6

On November 15, the Panthers played the North Carolina State Wolfpack for the first time. State was coached by Horace Hendrickson, a Beaver Falls, PA native, and had a 3–4 record. Running back Alex Webster (future pro football star and coach) and guard Ray Barkouskie (brother of former Pitt All-American guard Bernie Barkouskie) were on the Wolfpack roster.

After beating Ohio State, the Orange, Sugar and Cotton Bowl committees were supposedly considering extending an invitation to Pitt. Coach Dawson told The News and Observer: "State is our worry at the present. After that we conclude our season against our arch rivals–Penn State. Before those two games we aren't thinking about bowls. The school's policy concerning bowls is not known because it hasn't been faced with the problem."

In front of only 12,746 fans, the Panthers defeated the Wolfpack 48–6 for their sixth win of the season. The Panthers scored seven touchdowns. Bobby Epps led the Panthers ground game with 157 yards gained, and scored the first and last touchdown of the game on short runs. Bill Hoffman scored on a 2-yard run and 26-yard pass from Pete Neft. Bill Reynolds, who also gained more yards rushing than the Wolfpack (118 to 88) scored twice on short runs. John Jacobs caught a 26-yard pass from Rudy Mattioli for a touchdown. Paul Blanda converted 6 of his 7 extra point attempts. Late in the third period, State freshman quarterback Eddie Frantz led a 14-play, 86-yard drive for the Wolfpack touchdown. He completed 4 of 4 passes on the drive, the final being a 13-yard touchdown toss to John Zubaty. The placement was blocked.

The Pitt starting lineup for the game against North Carolina State was Bill Adams (left end), Lou Palatella (left tackle), Merle DeLuca (left guard), Gabe Gembarosky (center), Tony Romantino (right guard), Eldred Kraemer (right tackle), Dick Deitrick (right end), Rudy Mattioli (quarterback), Bill Hoffman (left halfback), Billy Reynolds (right halfback) and Bobby Epps (fullback). Substitutes appearing in the game for Pitt were William Schmitt, Bob Kennedy, Joe Schmidt, Joe Zombek, Bill Priatko, Stuart Kline, Dick Gatz, William Cessar, Joe Bozek, George Glagola, John Censi, Glen Dillon, Ken Voytell, Francis Baron, Pete Neft, Paul Chess, Paul Blanda, Chester Rice, Ray Ferguson, Bob Wrabley, John Jacobs, Henry Ford, Bobbie Ingram, Don Schlick and Richie McCabe.

=== Penn State ===
Week 9: Penn State at Pitt

Team	1	2	3	4	Total
• Penn State	0	7	0	10	17
Pitt	0	0	0	0	0

- Date: November 22, 1952
- Location: Pitt Stadium
  Pittsburgh, PA
- Game start: 2:00 p.m.
- Game attendance: 53,766
- Game weather: cloudy
- Referee: John H. Williams (Bucknell)

Scoring summary
2	PSU	Buddy Rowell 3-yard run (Bill Leonard kick)	PSU 7–0
4	PSU	Leonard 12-yard field goal	PSU 10–0
4	PSU	Tony Rados 1-yard run ( Leonard kick)	PSU 17–0

The final game of the season was the annual intrastate match-up with Penn State. Third-year Coach Rip Engle's squad was 6–2–1. Pitt led the all-time series 30–19–2. Eleven Panthers, who played for three different head coaches during their stay, participated in their final game at Pitt Stadium.(Joe Bozek, Merle DeLuca, Joe Schmidt, Tony Romantino, George Glagola, Stuart Kline, Gabe Gembarosky, Francis Baron, Albert Smalara, Bill Reynolds and Paul Chess) Pitt guard Merle DeLuca and State end Joe Yukica did not play due to injuries.

The Panthers with a victory would possibly win the Lambert Trophy (which they had not done since 1937), retain Old Ironsides (which they were in possession of after last year's results), secure the coal scuttle (for beating Penn State) and receive a bowl invitation (their first since the 1937 Rose Bowl which Pitt turned down). The Panthers were favored and R. B. Freeman chairman of the Orange Bowl committee was in attendance. Starting guard Merle Dluca was injured and replaced by Bill Priatko.

The Pitt Panthers lost the Orange Bowl bid as they were shut out by the Nittany Lions 17–0. Lion safety, Jack Sherry, intercepted two passes that led to the State touchdowns. The first gained possession on the Panthers 29-yard line. Six plays later Buddy Rowell ran three yards through the middle of the Pitt line. Bill Leonard kicked the extra point. In the fourth quarter, the Lions drove 42 yards to the Panthers 4-yard line, where the Pitt defense stiffened. Leonard booted a 12-yard field goal. Then Sherry intercepted Rudy Mattioli's pass on the Pitt 35-yard line and raced to the 11. A Pitt roughing penalty moved the ball to the 1-yard line. Tony Rados scored on first down and Leonard converted the placement. Penn State won their twentieth game in the series, and gained revenge for the 1948 season when they were undefeated and Pitt upset their bowl aspirations.

The Pitt starting lineup for the game against Penn State was Bill Adams (left end), Lou Palatella (left tackle), Bill Priatko (left guard), Gabe Gembarosky (center), Tony Romantino (right guard), Eldred Kraemer (right tackle), Dick Deitrick (right end), Rudy Mattioli (quarterback), Bill Hoffman (left halfback), Billy Reynolds (right halfback) and Bobby Epps (fullback). Substitutes appearing in the game for Pitt were William Schmitt, Bob Kennedy, Joe Schmidt, Joe Zombek, Stuart Kline, Dick Gatz, William Cessar, Joe Bozek, George Glagola, Glen Dillon, Ken Voytell, Bob McQuaide, Pete Neft, Paul Blanda, Chester Rice, Bob Wrabley, John Jacobs, Henry Ford and Richie McCabe.

== Individual scoring summary ==
1952 Pittsburgh Panthers scoring summary
Player	Touchdowns	Extra points	Field goals	Safety	Points
Bill Reynolds	6	0	0	0	36
Bobby Epps	6	0	0	0	36
Bill Hoffman	4	0	0	0	24
Rudy Mattioli	3	0	0	0	18
John Jacobs	3	0	0	0	18
Paul Blanda	0	18	0	0	18
Pete Neft	2	0	0	0	12
Paul Chess	2	0	0	0	12
Dick Dietrick	1	0	0	0	6
Joe Zombek	0	0	0	2	4
Bob Kennedy	0	2	0	0	2
Bob Wrabley	0	1	0	0	1
Totals	23	15	1	0	156

== Postseason ==
The Panthers were rated #18 after beating Army and having a 3–1 record. They then lost to West Virginia and were unranked. After beating Ohio State they were 5–2 and ranked #14. The following week they beat N.C. State and were ranked two spots lower at #16.

Alabama was the favored southern team to play in the Orange Bowl. When their booster V. H. Friedman heard that Pitt was being courted as the team from the east he wrote to the Alabama president and cautioned him on accepting the bid: “I notice they name Pittsburgh as a prospective team," he wrote. "Pittsburgh has FOUR fine negro players. Other eastern teams have negro players. SO if anything did come-in the way of an invitation we want to be sure to insist that no negroes be allowed in the game." Syracuse was given the bid and had no Afro-Americans on their roster.

Joe Schmidt was named first team on the INS All-American squad, and Eldred Kraemer was the only sophomore named to the Look Magazine All-American defensive team.

Three Panthers represented the University of Pittsburgh in All-Star games: on Christmas night linebacker Joe Schmidt played in the North-South Shrine Game held at Miami, FL; on December 27, halfback Billy Reynolds played in the East–West Shrine Bowl at San Francisco; and on the same day, Joe Bozek played in the Blue–Gray Football Classic at Montgomery, AL.

== Team players drafted into the NFL ==
The following players were selected in the 1953 NFL draft.

Player	Position	Round	Pick	NFL club
Billy Reynolds	halfback	2	23	Cleveland Browns
Joe Schmidt	linebacker	7	86	Detroit Lions
