= 1952 Penn State Nittany Lions football team =

American college football season

1952 Penn State Nittany Lions football
- Conference: Independent
- Record: 7–2–1
- Head coach: Rip Engle (3rd season)
- Captains: Joe Gratson; Stewart Scheetz
- Home stadium: New Beaver Field

1952 Eastern college football independents records
	Conf.			Overall
Team	W	L	T	W		L		T
Rochester		–		8	–	0	–	0
Hofstra		–		8	–	1	–	0
No. 19 Princeton		–		8	–	1	–	0
Franklin & Marshall		–		7	–	1	–	0
Villanova		–		7	–	1	–	1
Holy Cross		–		8	–	2	–	0
Yale		–		7	–	2	–	0
Penn State		–		7	–	2	–	1
No. 14 Syracuse		–		7	–	3	–	0
Bucknell		–		6	–	3	–	0
Colgate		–		6	–	3	–	0
Pittsburgh		–		6	–	3	–	0
Carnegie Tech		–		4	–	3	–	0
Harvard		–		5	–	4	–	0
Boston University		–		5	–	4	–	1
Penn		–		4	–	3	–	2
Army		–		4	–	4	–	1
Boston College		–		4	–	4	–	1
Tufts		–		3	–	4	–	1
Drexel		–		3	–	4	–	0
Fordham		–		2	–	5	–	1
NYU		–		2	–	5	–	1
Columbia		–		2	–	6	–	1
Brown		–		2	–	7	–	0
Cornell		–		2	–	7	–	0
Dartmouth		–		2	–	7	–	0
Temple		–		2	–	7	–	1
Buffalo		–		1	–	7	–	0
Rankings from AP Poll

The 1952 Penn State Nittany Lions football team represented Pennsylvania State University as an independent during the 1952 college football season. The team was coached by Rip Engle and played its home games in New Beaver Field in State College, Pennsylvania.

== Schedule ==
Date	Opponent	Rank	Site	Result	Attendance	Source
September 20	Temple		New Beaver Field; State College, PA	W 20–13	15,889	
September 27	Purdue		New Beaver Field; State College, PA	T 20–20	20,506	
October 4	William & Mary		New Beaver Field; State College, PA	W 35–23	22,848	
October 11	at West Virginia	No. 20	Mountaineer Field; Morgantown, WV (rivalry)	W 35–21	18,500	
October 18	Nebraska^{†}	No. 19	New Beaver Field; State College, PA	W 10–0	28,551	
October 25	at No. 1 Michigan State	No. 17	Macklin Stadium; East Lansing, MI (rivalry)	L 7–34	51,162	
November 1	at No. 17 Penn		Franklin Field; Philadelphia, PA	W 14–7	67,000	
November 8	at Syracuse	No. 15	Archbold Stadium; Syracuse, NY (rivalry)	L 7–25	16,000	
November 15	Rutgers		New Beaver Field; State College, PA	W 7–6	15,957	
November 22	at No. 16 Pittsburgh		Pitt Stadium; Pittsburgh, PA (rivalry)	W 17–0	53,766	
^{†}Homecoming; Rankings from AP Poll released prior to the game
