= 1952 Cornell Big Red football team =

American college football season

1952 Cornell Big Red football
- Conference: Independent
- Record: 2–7
- Head coach: George K. James (6th season)
- Captain: Bill Whelan
- Home stadium: Schoellkopf Field

1952 Eastern college football independents records
	Conf.			Overall
Team	W	L	T	W		L		T
Rochester		–		8	–	0	–	0
Hofstra		–		8	–	1	–	0
No. 19 Princeton		–		8	–	1	–	0
Franklin & Marshall		–		7	–	1	–	0
Villanova		–		7	–	1	–	1
Holy Cross		–		8	–	2	–	0
Yale		–		7	–	2	–	0
Penn State		–		7	–	2	–	1
No. 14 Syracuse		–		7	–	3	–	0
Bucknell		–		6	–	3	–	0
Colgate		–		6	–	3	–	0
Pittsburgh		–		6	–	3	–	0
Carnegie Tech		–		4	–	3	–	0
Harvard		–		5	–	4	–	0
Boston University		–		5	–	4	–	1
Penn		–		4	–	3	–	2
Army		–		4	–	4	–	1
Boston College		–		4	–	4	–	1
Tufts		–		3	–	4	–	1
Drexel		–		3	–	4	–	0
Fordham		–		2	–	5	–	1
NYU		–		2	–	5	–	1
Columbia		–		2	–	6	–	1
Brown		–		2	–	7	–	0
Cornell		–		2	–	7	–	0
Dartmouth		–		2	–	7	–	0
Temple		–		2	–	7	–	1
Buffalo		–		1	–	7	–	0
Rankings from AP Poll

The 1952 Cornell Big Red football team was an American football team that represented Cornell University as an independent during the 1952 college football season. In its sixth season under head coach George K. James, the team compiled a 2–7 record and was outscored 195 to 68. Bill Whelan was the team captain.

Cornell played its home games at Schoellkopf Field in Ithaca, New York.

== Schedule ==
Date	Opponent	Site	Result	Attendance	Source
September 27	Colgate	Schoellkopf Field; Ithaca, NY (rivalry)	L 7–14	14,000	
October 4	Navy	Schoellkopf Field; Ithaca, NY	L 7–31	25,000	
October 11	at Syracuse	Archbold Stadium; Syracuse, NY	L 6–26	23,000	
October 18	at Yale	Yale Bowl; New Haven, CT	L 0–13	31,000	
October 25	Princeton	Schoellkopf Field; Ithaca, NY	L 0–27	28,000	
November 1	at Columbia	Baker Field; New York, NY (rivalry)	W 21–14	22,000	
November 8	at Michigan	Michigan Stadium; Ann Arbor, MI	L 7–49	51,102	
November 15	Dartmouth	Schoellkopf Field; Ithaca, NY (rivalry)	W 13–7	14,000	
November 27	at Penn	Franklin Field; Philadelphia, PA (rivalry)	L 7–14	40,000	
