= 1952 Columbia Lions football team =

American college football season

1952 Columbia Lions football
- Conference: Independent
- Record: 2–6–1
- Head coach: Lou Little (23rd season)
- Captain: Robert McCullough
- Home stadium: Baker Field

1952 Eastern college football independents records
	Conf.			Overall
Team	W	L	T	W		L		T
Rochester		–		8	–	0	–	0
Hofstra		–		8	–	1	–	0
No. 19 Princeton		–		8	–	1	–	0
Franklin & Marshall		–		7	–	1	–	0
Villanova		–		7	–	1	–	1
Holy Cross		–		8	–	2	–	0
Yale		–		7	–	2	–	0
Penn State		–		7	–	2	–	1
No. 14 Syracuse		–		7	–	3	–	0
Bucknell		–		6	–	3	–	0
Colgate		–		6	–	3	–	0
Pittsburgh		–		6	–	3	–	0
Carnegie Tech		–		4	–	3	–	0
Harvard		–		5	–	4	–	0
Boston University		–		5	–	4	–	1
Penn		–		4	–	3	–	2
Army		–		4	–	4	–	1
Boston College		–		4	–	4	–	1
Tufts		–		3	–	4	–	1
Drexel		–		3	–	4	–	0
Fordham		–		2	–	5	–	1
NYU		–		2	–	5	–	1
Columbia		–		2	–	6	–	1
Brown		–		2	–	7	–	0
Cornell		–		2	–	7	–	0
Dartmouth		–		2	–	7	–	0
Temple		–		2	–	7	–	1
Buffalo		–		1	–	7	–	0
Rankings from AP Poll

The 1952 Columbia Lions football team was an American football team that represented Columbia University as an independent during the 1952 college football season.

In their 23rd season under head coach Lou Little, the Lions compiled a 2–6–1 record, and were outscored 184 to 117. Robert McCullough was the team captain.

Columbia played its home games at Baker Field in Upper Manhattan, in New York City.

== Schedule ==
Date	Opponent	Site	Result	Attendance	Source
September 27	No. 14 Princeton	Baker Field; New York, NY	L 0–14	30,000	
October 4	at Harvard	Harvard Stadium; Boston, MA	W 16–7	14,000	
October 11	at Yale	Yale Bowl; New Haven, CT	L 28–35	23,000	
October 18	No. 14 Penn	Baker Field; New York, NY	L 17–27	20,000	
October 25	Army^{†}	Baker Field; New York, NY	T 14–14	31,000	
November 1	Cornell	Baker Field; New York, NY (rivalry)	L 14–21	22,000	
November 8	at Dartmouth	Memorial Field; Hanover, NH	L 14–38	9,000	
November 15	at Navy	Thompson Stadium; Annapolis, MD	L 0–28	14,000	
November 22	Brown	Baker Field; New York, NY	W 14–0	4,000	
^{†}Homecoming; Rankings from AP Poll released prior to the game
