= 1952 Rhode Island Rams football team =

American college football season

1952 Rhode Island Rams football

Yankee Conference co-champion
- Conference: Yankee Conference
- Record: 7–1 (3–1 Yankee)
- Head coach: Hal Kopp (2nd season)
- Home stadium: Meade Stadium

1952 Yankee Conference football standings
	Conf.					Overall
Team	W		L		T	W		L		T
Connecticut +	3	–	1	–	0	5	–	3	–	0
Maine +	3	–	1	–	0	4	–	3	–	0
Rhode Island +	3	–	1	–	0	7	–	1	–	0
UMass	1	–	2	–	0	4	–	3	–	1
Vermont	0	–	1	–	0	2	–	5	–	0
New Hampshire	0	–	4	–	0	2	–	4	–	1
+ – Conference co-champions

The 1952 Rhode Island Rams football team was an American football team that represented Rhode Island State College (later renamed the University of Rhode Island) as a member of the Yankee Conference during the 1952 college football season. In its second, non-consecutive season under head coach Hal Kopp, the team compiled a 7–1 record (3–1 against conference opponents), finished in a three-way tie for the conference championship, and outscored opponents by a total of 215 to 85.

The team gained 2,247 rushing yards and 723 passing yards. On defense, they held opponents to 1,063 rushing yards and 1,052 passing yards. The team's individual leaders included:

- Halfback Pat Abbruzzi led the team in rushing (1,189 yards, 167 carries), total offense (1,200 yards), and scoring (72 points on 12 touchdowns). He later played four years in the Canadian Football League for the Montreal Alouettes; he was named CFL's Most Outstanding Player Award in 1955.
- Quarterback Art Roche completed 35 of 81 passes for 514 yards, three touchdowns, and nine interceptions.
- End Harold "Cap" Smith caught 21 passes for 285 yards.

The team played its home games at Meade Stadium in Kingston, Rhode Island.

== Schedule ==
Date	Opponent	Site	Result	Attendance	Source
September 20	Northeastern*	Meade Stadium; Kingston, RI	W 32–0	3,712	
September 27	at Maine	Alumni Field; Orono, ME	L 0–13		
October 4	at New Hampshire	Cowell Stadium; Durham, NH	W 27–7		
October 11	at Brown*	Brown Stadium; Providence, RI (rivalry)	W 7–6	12,000	
October 18	UMass	Meade Stadium; Kingston, RI	W 26–7	4,000	
November 1	at Springfield*	Pratt Field; Springfield, MA	W 40–20	3,200	
November 8	Brooklyn*	Meade Stadium; Kingston, RI	W 55–7		
November 15	Connecticut	Meade Stadium; Kingston, RI (rivalry)	W 28–25	7,000	
*Non-conference game
