= 1952 Dartmouth Indians football team =

American college football season

1952 Dartmouth Indians football
- Conference: Independent
- Record: 2–7
- Head coach: Tuss McLaughry (10th season)
- Captain: Peter Reich
- Home stadium: Memorial Field

1952 Eastern college football independents records
	Conf.			Overall
Team	W	L	T	W		L		T
Rochester		–		8	–	0	–	0
Hofstra		–		8	–	1	–	0
No. 19 Princeton		–		8	–	1	–	0
Franklin & Marshall		–		7	–	1	–	0
Villanova		–		7	–	1	–	1
Holy Cross		–		8	–	2	–	0
Yale		–		7	–	2	–	0
Penn State		–		7	–	2	–	1
No. 14 Syracuse		–		7	–	3	–	0
Bucknell		–		6	–	3	–	0
Colgate		–		6	–	3	–	0
Pittsburgh		–		6	–	3	–	0
Carnegie Tech		–		4	–	3	–	0
Harvard		–		5	–	4	–	0
Boston University		–		5	–	4	–	1
Penn		–		4	–	3	–	2
Army		–		4	–	4	–	1
Boston College		–		4	–	4	–	1
Tufts		–		3	–	4	–	1
Drexel		–		3	–	4	–	0
Fordham		–		2	–	5	–	1
NYU		–		2	–	5	–	1
Columbia		–		2	–	6	–	1
Brown		–		2	–	7	–	0
Cornell		–		2	–	7	–	0
Dartmouth		–		2	–	7	–	0
Temple		–		2	–	7	–	1
Buffalo		–		1	–	7	–	0
Rankings from AP Poll

The 1952 Dartmouth Indians football team was an American football team that represented Dartmouth College as an independent during the 1952 college football season. In their tenth season under head coach Tuss McLaughry, the Indians compiled a 2–7 record, and were outscored 198 to 116. Peter Reich was the team captain.

Dartmouth played its home games at Memorial Field on the college campus in Hanover, New Hampshire.

== Schedule ==
Date	Opponent	Site	Result	Attendance	Source
September 27	Holy Cross	Memorial Field; Hanover, NH	L 9–27	14,327	
October 4	at Penn	Franklin Field; Philadelphia, PA	L 0–7	35,000	
October 11	at Army	Michie Stadium; West Point, NY	L 7–37	18,127	
October 18	Rutgers^{†}	Memorial Field; Hanover, NH	W 29–20	8,000	
October 25	at Harvard	Harvard Stadium; Boston, MA (rivalry)	L 19–26	31,000	
November 1	at Yale	Yale Bowl; New Haven, CT	L 7–21	40,000	
November 8	Columbia	Memorial Field; Hanover, NH	W 38–14	9,000	
November 15	at Cornell	Schoellkopf Field; Ithaca, NY (rivalry)	L 7–13	14,000	
November 22	at No. 17 Princeton	Palmer Stadium; Princeton, NJ	L 0–33	26,000	
^{†}Homecoming; Rankings from AP Poll released prior to the game
