= 1952 Yale Bulldogs football team =

American college football season

1952 Yale Bulldogs football
- Conference: Independent
- Record: 7–2
- Head coach: Jordan Olivar (1st season)
- Captain: Joe Mitinger
- Home stadium: Yale Bowl

1952 Eastern college football independents records
	Conf.			Overall
Team	W	L	T	W		L		T
Rochester		–		8	–	0	–	0
Hofstra		–		8	–	1	–	0
No. 19 Princeton		–		8	–	1	–	0
Franklin & Marshall		–		7	–	1	–	0
Villanova		–		7	–	1	–	1
Holy Cross		–		8	–	2	–	0
Yale		–		7	–	2	–	0
Penn State		–		7	–	2	–	1
No. 14 Syracuse		–		7	–	3	–	0
Bucknell		–		6	–	3	–	0
Colgate		–		6	–	3	–	0
Pittsburgh		–		6	–	3	–	0
Carnegie Tech		–		4	–	3	–	0
Harvard		–		5	–	4	–	0
Boston University		–		5	–	4	–	1
Penn		–		4	–	3	–	2
Army		–		4	–	4	–	1
Boston College		–		4	–	4	–	1
Tufts		–		3	–	4	–	1
Drexel		–		3	–	4	–	0
Fordham		–		2	–	5	–	1
NYU		–		2	–	5	–	1
Columbia		–		2	–	6	–	1
Brown		–		2	–	7	–	0
Cornell		–		2	–	7	–	0
Dartmouth		–		2	–	7	–	0
Temple		–		2	–	7	–	1
Buffalo		–		1	–	7	–	0
Rankings from AP Poll

The 1952 Yale Bulldogs football team represented Yale University in the 1952 college football season. The Bulldogs were led by first-year head coach Jordan Olivar, played their home games at the Yale Bowl and finished the season with a 7–2 record.

== Schedule ==
Date	Opponent	Site	Result	Attendance	Source
September 20	Connecticut	Yale Bowl; New Haven, CT	W 34–13	26,500	
September 27	at Navy	Municipal Stadium; Baltimore, MD	L 0–31	25,000	
October 4	Brown	Yale Bowl; New Haven, CT	W 28–0	22,500	
October 11	at Columbia	Yale Bowl; New Haven, CT	W 35–28	23,000	
October 18	Cornell	Yale Bowl; New Haven, CT	W 13–0	31,000	
October 25	Lafayette	Yale Bowl; New Haven, CT	W 47–0	18,000	
November 1	Dartmouth	Yale Bowl; New Haven, CT	W 21–7	40,000	
November 15	No. 16 Princeton	Yale Bowl; New Haven, CT (rivalry)	L 21–27	62,000	
November 19	at Harvard	Harvard Stadium; Boston, MA (The Game)	W 41–14	38,114	
Rankings from AP Poll released prior to the game

== NFL draft ==
The following Bulldog was selected in the National Football League draft following the season.

Round	Pick	Player	Position	NFL team
11	125	Ed Woodsum	E	Chicago Cardinals
