= 1952 Connecticut Huskies football team =

American college football season

1952 Connecticut Huskies football

Yankee Conference co-champion
- Conference: Yankee Conference
- Record: 5–3 (3–1 Yankee)
- Head coach: Bob Ingalls (1st season)
- Home stadium: Gardner Dow Athletic Fields

1952 Yankee Conference football standings
| | Conf. | | | | | Overall |
| Team | W | | L | | T | W | | L | | T |
|---|---|---|---|---|---|---|---|---|---|---|
| Connecticut + | 3 | – | 1 | – | 0 | 5 | – | 3 | – | 0 |
| Maine + | 3 | – | 1 | – | 0 | 4 | – | 3 | – | 0 |
| Rhode Island + | 3 | – | 1 | – | 0 | 7 | – | 1 | – | 0 |
| UMass | 1 | – | 2 | – | 0 | 4 | – | 3 | – | 1 |
| Vermont | 0 | – | 1 | – | 0 | 2 | – | 5 | – | 0 |
| New Hampshire | 0 | – | 4 | – | 0 | 2 | – | 4 | – | 1 |
+ – Conference co-champions

The 1952 Connecticut Huskies football team represented the University of Connecticut in the 1952 college football season. The Huskies were led by first-year head coach Bob Ingalls, and completed the season with a record of 5–3.

== Schedule ==
| Date | Opponent | Site | Result | Attendance | Source |
|---|---|---|---|---|---|
| September 20 | at Yale* | Yale Bowl; New Haven, CT | L 13–34 | 26,500 | |
| September 27 | Buffalo* | Gardner Dow Athletic Fields; Storrs, CT | W 6–7 | | |
| October 4 | UMass | Gardner Dow Athletic Fields; Storrs, CT (rivalry) | W 26–13 | | |
| October 18 | Maine | Gardner Dow Athletic Fields; Storrs, CT | W 13–7 | | |
| October 25 | at Delaware* | Wilmington Park; Wilmington, DE | W 25–13 | 4,419 | |
| November 1 | at New Hampshire | Cowell Stadium; Durham, NH | W 16–12 | | |
| November 8 | at Brown* | Brown Stadium; Providence, RI | L 13–21 | 4,500 | |
| November 15 | at Rhode Island | Meade Stadium; Kingston, RI (rivalry) | L 25–28 | 7,000 | |
*Non-conference game
