= 1952 college football rankings =

- Season: 1952
- Bowl season: 1952–53 bowl games
- Preseason No. 1: Michigan State
- End of season champions: Michigan State

Two human polls comprised the 1952 college football rankings. Unlike most sports, college football's governing body, the NCAA, does not bestow a national championship, instead that title is bestowed by one or more different polling agencies. There are two main weekly polls that begin in the preseason—the AP Poll and the Coaches Poll.

== Legend ==
	Increase in ranking
	Decrease in ranking
	Not ranked previous week
	National champion
(#–#)	Win–loss record
(Italics)	Number of first place votes
т	Tied with team above or below also with this symbol

== AP Poll ==
The final AP Poll was released on December 1, at the end of the 1952 regular season, weeks before the major bowls. The AP would not release a post-bowl season final poll regularly until 1968.

	Preseason Aug	Week 1 Sep 29	Week 2 Oct 6	Week 3 Oct 13	Week 4 Oct 20	Week 5 Oct 27	Week 6 Nov 3	Week 7 Nov 10	Week 8 Nov 17	Week 9 Nov 24	Week 10 (Final) Dec 1	
1.	Michigan State (77)	Michigan State (1–0) (52)	Wisconsin (2–0) (27)	Michigan State (3–0) (39)	Michigan State (4–0) (49)	Michigan State (5–0) (38)	Michigan State (6–0) (33)	Michigan State (7–0) (57)	Michigan State (8–0) (80)	Michigan State (9–0) (88)	Michigan State (9–0) (207)	1.
2.	Maryland (79)	Illinois (1–0) (4)	Michigan State (2–0) (24)	Maryland (4–0) (31)	Maryland (5–0) (36)	Maryland (6–0) (32)	Maryland (7–0) (35)	Georgia Tech (8–0) (32)	Georgia Tech (9–0) (14)	USC (9–0) (24)	Georgia Tech (11–0) (36)	2.
3.	Georgia Tech (15)	Maryland (2–0) (7)	California (3–0) (23)	California (4–0) (21)	Oklahoma (3–0–1) (23)	Oklahoma (4–0–1) (20)	Georgia Tech (7–0) (27)	Maryland (7–0) (24)	UCLA (8–0) (9)	Georgia Tech (10–0) (20)	Notre Dame (7–2–1) (4)	3.
4.	Oklahoma (16)	California (2–0)	Maryland (3–0) (22)	Georgia Tech (4–0) (4)	California (5–0) (9)	Georgia Tech (6–0) (7)	Oklahoma (5–0–1) (27)	UCLA (8–0) (15)	USC (8–0) (11)	Oklahoma (7–1–1) (3)	Oklahoma (8–1–1) (14)	4.
5.	Illinois (7)	Texas (2–0) (5)	Georgia Tech (3–0) (12)	Duke (4–0) (9)	Georgia Tech (5–0) (5)	USC (6–0) (7)	UCLA (7–0) (11)	USC (7–0) (7)	Oklahoma (6–1–1) (1)	UCLA (8–1)	USC (9–1) (2)	5.
6.	Tennessee (5)	Georgia Tech (2–0)	Duke (3–0) (12)	Oklahoma (2–0–1) (5)	Duke (5–0) (5)	Duke (6–0) (10)	USC (6–0) (3)	Notre Dame (5–1–1) (3)	Ole Miss (7–0–2) (4)	Ole Miss (7–0–2) (5)	UCLA (8–1) (1)	6.
7.	Wisconsin (4)	USC (2–0) (5)	USC (3–0) (6)	USC (4–0) (2)	USC (5–0) (1)	UCLA (6–0) (6)	Kansas (6–1)	Tennessee (6–1)	Tennessee (7–1) (4)	Notre Dame (6–2–1)	Ole Miss (8–0–2) (3)	7.
8.	California (2)	Wisconsin (1–0) (1)	Notre Dame (1–0–1) (3)	Kansas (4–0) (1)	UCLA (5–0) (3)	Purdue (3–1–1) (1)	Tennessee (5–1)	Oklahoma (5–1–1)	Maryland (7–1)	Alabama (8–2) (1)	Tennessee (8–1–1)	8.
9.	TCU (1)	Kansas (2–0)	Kansas (3–0) (1)	Purdue (2–0–1)	Virginia (4–0) (5)	Kansas (5–1)	Purdue (3–2–1)	Texas (6–2)	Notre Dame (5–2–1)	Tennessee (7–1–1)	Alabama (9–2)	9.
10.	Notre Dame	Duke (2–0)	Princeton (2–0) (3)	UCLA (4–0)	Wisconsin (3–1)	Villanova (6–0)	Notre Dame (4–1–1)	Purdue (3–2–2)	Texas (7–2)	Texas (7–2)	Texas (8–2)	10.
11.	Texas	Tennessee (1–0) (2)	UCLA (3–0)	Virginia (3–0) (7)	Penn (3–0–1)	California (5–1)	Villanova (6–0–1)	Ole Miss (6–0–2)	Tulsa (6–1–1) (3)	Tulsa (7–1–1) (8)	Wisconsin (6–2–1)	11.
12.	Penn	Villanova (2–0) (2)	Oklahoma (1–0–1) (1)	Wisconsin (2–1)	Villanova (5–0)	Tennessee (4–1)	Duke (6–1)	Alabama (7–1)	Michigan (5–3)	Wisconsin (6–2–1)	Tulsa (8–1–1) (3)	12.
13.	Stanford	Princeton (1–0) (1)	Illinois (1–1)	Stanford (4–0)	Tennessee (3–1)	Notre Dame (3–1–1)	Texas (5–2)	Syracuse (5–2)	Wisconsin (6–2)	Duke (8–2)	Maryland (7–2)	13.
14.	Princeton	UCLA (2–0)	Villanova (3–0)	Penn (2–0–1)	Ohio State (3–1)	Texas (4–2)	Ole Miss (5–0–2)	Pittsburgh (5–2) (1)	Alabama (7–2)	Purdue (4–3–2)	Syracuse (7–2)	14.
15.	Washington State	Ohio State (1–0)	Virginia (2–0) (3)	Villanova (4–0)	Kansas (4–1)	Michigan (3–2)	Penn State (5–1–1)	Wisconsin (5–2)	Syracuse (6–2)	Maryland (7–2)	Florida (6–3)	15.
16.	USC (1)	Virginia (1–0) (2)	Purdue (1–0–1)	Ohio State (2–1)	Notre Dame (2–1–1)	Virginia (4–1)	Alabama (6–1)	Princeton (6–1)	Pittsburgh (6–2) (1)	Syracuse (7–2)	Duke (8–2)	16.
17.	Kansas (1)	Rice (1–0)	Navy (2–0)	Illinois (2–1)	Penn State (4–0–1) (2)	Penn (3–0–2)	Florida (4–2)	Washington (6–2)	Princeton (7–1)	Florida (6–3)	Ohio State (6–3)	17.
18.	UCLA	Ole Miss (1–0–1)	Alabama (3–0)	Alabama (4–0)	Pittsburgh (3–1)	Wisconsin (3–2)	Wisconsin (4–2)	Florida (5–2)	Kansas (7–2)	Princeton (8–1)	Purdue (4–3–2)	18.
19.	Duke	Notre Dame (0–0–1)	Georgia (3–0)	Penn State (3–0–1)	Michigan (2–2)	Alabama (5–1)	Princeton (5–1)	Kansas (6–2)	Houston (6–2)	Kentucky (5–3–2)	Princeton (8–1)	19.
20.	Ohio State	Oklahoma (0–0–1)	Penn State (2–0–1) (1)	Navy (3–0)	Texas (3–2)	Florida (3–2)	Holy Cross (5–1)	Michigan (4–3)	Duke (7–2)	Virginia (7–2)	Kentucky (5–3–2)	20.
	Preseason Aug	Week 1 Sep 29	Week 2 Oct 6	Week 3 Oct 13	Week 4 Oct 20	Week 5 Oct 27	Week 6 Nov 3	Week 7 Nov 10	Week 8 Nov 17	Week 9 Nov 24	Week 10 (Final) Dec 1	
		Dropped: Penn; Stanford; TCU; Washington State	Dropped: Ole Miss; Ohio State; Rice; Tennessee; Texas	Dropped: Georgia; Notre Dame; Princeton	Dropped: Alabama; Illinois; Navy; Purdue; Stanford	Dropped: Ohio State; Penn State; Pittsburgh	Dropped: California; Michigan; Penn; Virginia	Dropped: Duke; Holy Cross; Penn State; Villanova	Dropped: Florida; Purdue; Washington	Dropped: Houston; Kansas; Michigan; Pittsburgh	Dropped: Virginia	

== United Press Coaches Poll ==
The final United Press (UP) Coaches Poll was released prior to the bowl games, on December 2.
Michigan State received 32 of the 35 first-place votes; one each went to Georgia Tech, Notre Dame, and Oklahoma.

Ranking	Team	Conference	Bowl
1	Michigan State	Independent	none
2	Georgia Tech	SEC	Won Sugar, 24–7
3	Notre Dame	Independent	none
4	Oklahoma	Big Seven	none
4	USC	Pacific Coast	Won Rose, 7–0
6	UCLA	Pacific Coast	none
7	Ole Miss	SEC	Lost Sugar, 7–24
8	Tennessee	SEC	Lost Cotton, 0–16
9	Alabama	SEC	Won Orange, 61–6
10	Wisconsin	Big Ten	Lost Rose, 0–7
11	Texas	Southwest	Won Cotton, 16–0
12	Purdue	Big Ten	none
13	Maryland	Southern	none
14	Princeton	Independent	none
15	Ohio State	Big Ten	none
15	Pittsburgh	Independent	none
17	Navy	Independent	none
18	Duke	Southern	none
19	Houston	MVC	none
19	Kentucky	SEC	none

- Prior to the 1975 season, the Big Ten and Pacific Coast (later AAWU / Pac-8) conferences allowed only one postseason participant each, for the Rose Bowl.
- The Ivy League has prohibited its members from participating in postseason football since the league was officially formed in 1954.

== Litkenhous Ratings ==
The Litkenhous Ratings released in mid-December 1952 provided numerical rankings to over 600 college football programs. The top 150 ranked teams were:

1. Michigan State (9–0) - 115.1
2. Georgia Tech (12–0) - 111.9
3. USC (10–1) - 111.3
4. Oklahoma (8–1–1) - 111.1
5. UCLA (8–1) - 111.0
6. Tennessee (8–2–1) - 109.6
7. Notre Dame (7–2–1) - 105.0
8. Florida (8–3) - 103.4
9. Ole Miss (8–1–2) - 103.1
10. Alabama (10–2) - 102.9
11. California (7–3) - 102.2
12. Maryland (7–2) - 102.2
13. Texas (9–2) - 101.8
14. Wisconsin (6–3–1) - 101.2
15. Ohio State (6–3) - 100.9
16. Duke (8–2) - 100.5
17. Michigan (5–4) - 99.7
18. Purdue (4–3–2) - 99.7
19. Kansas (7–3) - 99.2
20. Mississippi State (5–4) - 96.9
21. Houston (8–2) - 96.1
22. Tulsa (8–2–1) 95.9
23. Washington (7–3) - 95.4
24. Illinois (4–5) - 94.9
25. Colorado (6–2–2) - 94.5
26. Navy (6–2–1) - 93.9
27. Cincinnati (8–1–1) - 93.5
28. TCU (4–4–2) - 93.4
29. Arizona State (6–3) - 92.7
30. Kentucky (5–4–2) - 92.3
31. Georgia (7–4) - 92.0
32. Pittsburgh (6–3) - 92.0
33. SMU (4–5–1) - 92.0
34. Virginia (8–2) - 91.8
35. LSU (3–7) - 91.7
36. Rice (5–5) - 91.6
37. Tulane (5–5) - 91.6
38. Villanova (7–1–1) - 91.3
39. Miami (OH) (7–3) - 90.8
40. Missouri (5–5) - 90.8
41. Minnesota (4–3–2) - 90.2
42. Princeton (8–1) - 90.0
43. East Texas (11–0) - 89.8
44. Texas A&M (3–6–1) - 89.7
45. Nebraska (5–4–1) - 89.2
46. Baylor (4–4–2) - 88.6
47. Stanford (5–5) - 88.0
48. Chattanooga (7–3) - 87.8
49. Pacific (7–3–1) - 87.7
50. Vanderbilt (3–5–2) - 87.5
51. Penn State (7–2–1)
52. Mississippi Southern (10–2)
53. Army (4–4–1)
54. Auburn (2–8)
55. Penn (4–3–2)
56. Arizona (6–4)
57. Oklahoma A&M (3–7)
58. Northwestern (2–6–1)
59. Holy Cross (8–2)
60. Washington State (4–6)
61. Indiana (2–7)
62. Marquette (3–5–1)
63. Syracuse (7–3)
64. Iowa (2–7)
65. Arkansas (2–8)
66. West Virginia (7–2)
67. North Carolina (2–6)
68. San Jose State (6–3)
69. Wake Forest (5–4–1)
70. Yale (7–2)
71. North Texas (7–3)
72. Utah (6–3–1)
73. Fordham (2–5–1)
74. Miami (FL) (4–7)
75. Texas Tech (3–7–1)
76. South Carolina (5–5)
77. William & Mary (4–5)
78. Oregon State (2–7)
79. Clemson (2–6–1)
80. Iowa State (3–6)
81. Hardin–Simmons (5–3–2)
82. Detroit (3–6)
83. Arkansas State (8–3)
84. Santa Clara (2–6–1)
85. Dayton
86. Idaho (4–4–1)
87. Xavier (4–6)
88. Oregon (2–7–1)
89. Bowling Green
90. Colorado A&M (6–4)
91. Compton
92. New Mexico (7–2)
93. Kansas State (1–9)
94. Wyoming (5–4)
95. Lenoir Rhyne
96. Tyler JC
97. Columbia (2–6–1)
98. Abilene Christian (6–3–1)
99. Pasadena JC
100. Boston University (5–4–1)
101. John Carroll
102. West Chester (7–0)
103. Cornell (2–7)
104. Colgate (6–3)
105. Dartmouth (2–7)
106. Ohio (6–2–1)
107. Boston College (4–4–1)
108. Boise JC (8–1)
109. Western Kentucky (9–1)
110. George Washington (6–2–1)
111. BYU (4–6)
112. Texas Western (5–5–1)
113. McNeese (7–3)
114. Wichita (3–6–1)
115. Central Michigan (7–2)
116. Harvard (5–4)
117. Del Mar
118. Tennessee Tech (9–2)
119. Trinity (TX)
120. Heidelberg
121. Furman (6–3–1)
122. Sam Houston (6–4)
123. Louisiana Tech (6–1–2)
124. Southeastern Louisiana
125. Gustavus Adolphus
126. Idaho State (8–0)
127. Bucknell (6–3)
128. Rutgers (4–4–1)
129. Virginia Tech (5–6)
130. Southwestern Louisiana (5–2–2)
131. Southwest Texas (7–2)
132. American International
133. Temple (2–7–1)
134. El Camino
135. Shippensburg
136. Toledo (4–5)
137. Colorado College
138. Western Reserve (5–4)
139. Rhode Island (7–1)
140. East Los Angeles
141. El Dorado
142. Baldwin Wallace
143. Bradley
144. Connecticut (5–3)
145. VMI (3–6–1)
146. The Citadel (3–5–1)
147. Tampa (8–3–1)
148. Utah State (3–7–1)
149. Louisville (3–5)
150. Western Michigan (4–4)

== HBCU rankings ==
The Pittsburgh Courier, a leading African American newspaper, ranked the top 1952 teams from historically black colleges and universities in an era when college football was largely segregated. The rankings were published on December 20:

1. Florida A&M (8–2)
2. Virginia State (8–1)
3. Lincoln (MO) (7–0–1)
4. Tennessee A&I (8–2)
5. Texas Southern (9–0–1)
6. Maryland State (9–1)
7. Southern (9–2)
8. Bethune-Cookman (7–1)
9. Prairie View A&M (7–2)

The Associated Negro Press also published rankings on December 20:

1. Florida A&M (8–2)
2. Lincoln (MO) (7–0–1)
3. Texas Southern (9–0–1)
4. Virginia State (8–1)
5. Prairie View A&M (7–2)
6. Tennessee A&I (8–2)
7. Morris Brown (6–3)
8. Bethune-Cookman (7–1)
9. Maryland State (9–1)
10. Southern (9–2)
11. North Carolina A&T (6–4)
12. Grambling (7–3–1)
13. Texas College (4–3–1)
14. Central State (4–4)
15. South Carolina State (6–2)
16. Morris College (6–1)
17. Howard (6–2–1)
18. Allen (5–5)
19. North Carolina College (4–4)
20. Morgan State (4–4–1)
21. Hampton (4–5)
22. Alcorn (5–5)
23. Kentucky State (4–6–1)
24. Fisk (6–2)
25. Albany State (7–2)
26. Wiley (4–5)
27. Xavier (LA) (4–5)
28. Johnson C. Smith (5–2)
29. St. Augustine's (5–2)
30. Lane (6–2)
31. Fort Valley State (5–4–1)
32. West Virginia State (6–4)
33. Winston-Salem State (4–4)
34. Lincoln (PA) (5–3–1)
35. Elizabeth City (6–2)
36. Fayetteville State

== See also ==
- 1952 College Football All-America Team
