= 1952 Santa Barbara Gauchos football team =

American college football season

1952 Santa Barbara Gauchos football
- Conference: California Collegiate Athletic Association
- Record: 8–2 (3–1 CCAA)
- Head coach: Stan Williamson (5th season)
- Home stadium: La Playa Stadium

1952 California Collegiate Athletic Association football standings
	Conf.					Overall
Team	W		L		T	W		L		T
Cal Poly $	4	–	0	–	0	7	–	3	–	0
Santa Barbara	3	–	1	–	0	8	–	2	–	0
San Diego State	2	–	2	–	0	4	–	5	–	0
Los Angeles State	1	–	3	–	0	4	–	4	–	0
Pepperdine	0	–	4	–	0	2	–	7	–	0
$ – Conference champion

The 1952 UC Santa Barbara Gauchos football team represented Santa Barbara College (Note: University of California, Santa Barbara was known as Santa Barbara College of the University of California from 1944 to 1957.) during the 1952 college football season.

Santa Barbara competed in the California Collegiate Athletic Association (CCAA). The team was led by head coach Stan Williamson in the first year of his second tenure as head coach. He had coached the team from 1941 to 1948, before taking a sabbatical and serving in the Navy. While in the Navy, Williamson coached the San Diego Naval Air Station (Note: Naval Training Center San Diego (Naval Training Station) was a U.S. Navy facility from 1923 to 1997.) football team, including leading the team to the naval championship in 1951. The Gauchos played home games at La Playa Stadium in Santa Barbara, California. They finished the season with a record of eight wins and two losses (8–2, 3–1 CCAA).

== Schedule ==
Date	Opponent	Site	Result	Attendance	Source
September 19	La Verne*	La Playa Stadium; Santa Barbara, CA	W 34–6		
September 27	at Whittier*	Hadley Field; Whittier, CA	L 6–7		
October 3	at Occidental*	D.W. Patterson Field; Los Angeles, CA	W 14–12		
October 10	Cal Poly	La Playa Stadium; Santa Barbara, CA	L 0–19		
October 17	at Los Angeles State	Los Angeles State Field; Los Angeles, CA	W 21–20		
October 25	San Francisco State*	La Playa Stadium; Santa Barbara, CA	W 20–6		
November 1	vs. Cal Aggies (Note: The game against the Cal Aggies was part of an "All-UC Doubleheader" that was held annually from 1948 to 1963. The other game of the double-header was California vs. UCLA. The games were always held at the home stadium of either Cal or UCLA.)*	California Memorial Stadium; Berkeley, CA	W 48–0		
November 7	at Pepperdine	El Camino Stadium; Torrance, CA	W 27–6		
November 14	at Pomona*	Claremont Alumni Field; Claremont, CA	W 26–7		
November 21	San Diego State	La Playa Stadium; Santa Barbara, CA	W 21–20	5,500	
*Non-conference game
