= 1952 Cal Aggies football team =

American college football season

1952 Cal Aggies football
- Conference: Far Western Conference
- Record: 2–7 (2–1 FWC)
- Head coach: Ted Forbes (4th season)
- Captains: Don Niboli; Phil Wintz
- Home stadium: Aggie Field

1952 Far Western Conference football standings
	Conf.					Overall
Team	W		L		T	W		L		T
Humboldt State $	3	–	0	–	0	7	–	1	–	0
Cal Aggies	2	–	1	–	0	2	–	7	–	0
San Francisco State	1	–	0	–	0	3	–	6	–	0
Chico State	1	–	3	–	0	1	–	6	–	0
Southern Oregon	0	–	3	–	0	3	–	5	–	0
$ – Conference champion

The 1952 Cal Aggies football team represented the College of Agriculture at Davis—now known as the University of California, Davis—as a member of the Far Western Conference (FWC) during the 1952 college football season. Led by fourth-year head coach Ted Forbes, the Aggies compiled an overall record of 2–7 with a mark of 2–1 in conference play, placing second in the FWC. The team was outscored by its opponents 263 to 112 for the season. The Cal Aggies played home games at Aggie Field in Davis, California.

== Schedule ==
Date	Opponent	Site	Result	Source
September 20	at Fresno State*	Ratcliffe Stadium; Fresno, CA	L 7–41	
September 26	Occidental*	Aggie Field; Davis, CA	L 6–22	
October 4	at Nevada*	Mackay Stadium (Note: This stadium is the predecessor to the current Mackay Stadium, which was opened for the 1966 season.); Reno, NV	L 13–26	
October 11	at Whittier*	Hadley Field; Whittier, CA	L 13–27	
October 18	California JV (Note: The University of California JV team was commonly known as the "Cal Ramblers".)*	Aggie Field; Davis, CA	L 19–40	
October 25	Humboldt State	Aggie Field; Davis, CA	L 21–28	
November 1	vs. Santa Barbara (Note: The game against Santa Barbara was part of an "All-UC Doubleheader" that was held annually from 1948 to 1963. The other game of the double-header was California vs. UCLA. The games were always held at the home stadium of either Cal or UCLA.)*	California Memorial Stadium; Berkeley, CA	L 0–48	
November 8	at Southern Oregon	Walter E. Phillips Field ?; Ashland, OR	W 13–12	
November 15	at Chico State	Chico High School Stadium; Chico, CA	W 20–19	
*Non-conference game
