= 1952 Humboldt State Lumberjacks football team =

American college football season

1952 Humboldt State Lumberjacks football

FWC champion
- Conference: Far Western Conference
- Record: 7–1 (3–0 FWC)
- Head coach: Phil Sarboe (2nd season)
- Home stadium: Redwood Bowl

1952 Far Western Conference football standings
	Conf.					Overall
Team	W		L		T	W		L		T
Humboldt State $	3	–	0	–	0	7	–	1	–	0
Cal Aggies	2	–	1	–	0	2	–	7	–	0
San Francisco State	1	–	0	–	0	3	–	6	–	0
Chico State	1	–	3	–	0	1	–	6	–	0
Southern Oregon	0	–	3	–	0	3	–	5	–	0
$ – Conference champion

The 1952 Humboldt State Lumberjacks football team represented Humboldt State College—now known as California State Polytechnic University, Humboldt—as a member of the Far Western Conference (FWC) during the 1952 college football season. Led by second-year head coach Phil Sarboe, the Lumberjacks compiled an overall record of 7–1 with a mark of 3–0 in conference play, winning the FWC title, and outscored their opponents 266 to 53 for the season, an average score of 33–7. The defense yielded more than a touchdown in only one game. The team played home games at the Redwood Bowl in Arcata, California.

== Schedule ==
Date	Opponent	Site	Result	Source
September 13	Oregon Tech*	Albee Stadium; Eureka, CA	L 6–7	
September 27	Pacific Lutheran*	Redwood Bowl; Arcata, CA	W 7–6	
October 4	Chico State	Redwood Bowl; Arcata, CA	W 41–6	
October 11	Southern Oregon	Redwood Bowl; Arcata, CA	W 50–0	
October 18	Oregon freshmen*	Redwood Bowl; Arcata, CA	W 21–6	
October 25	at Cal Aggies	Aggie Field; Davis, CA	W 28–21	
November 1	Cal Poly San Dimas*	Albee Stadium; Eureka, CA	W 72–0	
November 15	Pepperdine*	Albee Stadium; Eureka, CA	W 41–7	
*Non-conference game
