= 1952 Washington Huskies football team =

American college football season

1952 Washington Huskies football
- Conference: Pacific Coast Conference
- Record: 7–3 (6–2 PCC)
- Head coach: Howie Odell (5th season)
- Captain: Dick Sprague
- Home stadium: University of Washington Stadium

1952 Pacific Coast Conference football standings
	Conf.					Overall
Team	W		L		T	W		L		T
No. 5 USC $	6	–	0	–	0	10	–	1	–	0
No. 6 UCLA	5	–	1	–	0	8	–	1	–	0
Washington	6	–	2	–	0	7	–	3	–	0
California	3	–	3	–	0	7	–	3	–	0
Washington State	3	–	4	–	0	4	–	6	–	0
Stanford	2	–	5	–	0	5	–	5	–	0
Oregon	2	–	5	–	0	2	–	7	–	1
Idaho	1	–	3	–	0	4	–	4	–	1
Oregon State	1	–	6	–	0	2	–	7	–	0
$ – Conference champion; Rankings from AP Poll

The 1952 Washington Huskies football team was an American football team that represented the University of Washington during the 1952 college football season. In its fifth season under head coach Howie Odell, the team compiled a 7–3 record, finished in third place in the Pacific Coast Conference, and outscored its opponents by a combined total of 248 to 201. Dick Sprague was the team captain.

== Schedule ==
Date	Opponent	Rank	Site	Result	Attendance	Source
September 20	Idaho		University of Washington Stadium; Seattle, WA	W 39–14	31,912	
September 27	Minnesota*		University of Washington Stadium; Seattle, WA	W 19–13	49,000	
October 4	No. 14 UCLA		University of Washington Stadium; Seattle, WA	L 7–32	43,000	
October 11	at No. 13 Illinois*		Memorial Stadium; Champaign, IL	L 14–48	48,248	
October 18	Oregon		University of Washington Stadium; Seattle, WA (rivalry)	W 49–0	35,000	
October 25	at Stanford		Stanford Stadium; Stanford, CA	W 27–14	25,000	
November 1	at Oregon State		Multnomah Stadium; Portland, OR	W 38–13	19,243	
November 8	California		University of Washington Stadium; Seattle, WA	W 22–7	51,000	
November 15	at No. 5 USC	No. 17	Los Angeles Memorial Coliseum; Los Angeles, CA	L 0–33	35,852	
November 29	at Washington State		Memorial Stadium; Spokane, WA (rivalry)	W 33–27	30,000	
*Non-conference game; Rankings from AP Poll released prior to the game; Source:

== NFL draft selections ==
Three University of Washington Huskies were selected in the 1953 NFL draft, which lasted 30 rounds with 361 selections.

= Husky Hall of Fame

Player	Position	Round	Pick	NFL club
Bill Earley	Back	13th	154	San Francisco 49ers
Dick Sprague	Back	14th	159	Chicago Cardinals
Louis Yourkowski	Tackle	26th	312	Los Angeles Rams

- Quarterback Don Heinrich, a fifth-year senior, was selected in the 1952 NFL draft (3rd round, 35th overall).
