= List of Pepperdine Waves men's basketball head coaches =

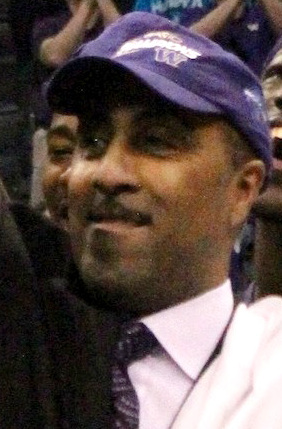
Lorenzo Romar, the current head coach of the Pepperdine Waves

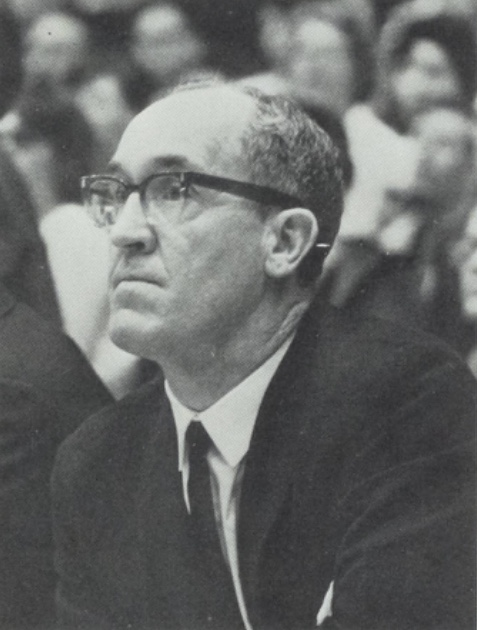
Duck Dowell, the winningest head coach in Waves men's basketball history

The following is a list of Pepperdine Waves men's basketball head coaches. There have been 13 head coaches of the Waves in their 85-season history.

Pepperdine's current head coach is Lorenzo Romar. He was hired for his second stint as the Waves' head coach in March 2018, replacing Marty Wilson, who was fired following the 2017–18 season.

No.	Tenure	Coach	Years	Record	Pct.
1	1938–1939	Wade Ruby	1	16–13	.552
2	1939–1948	Al Duer	9	176–102	.633
3	1948–1968	Duck Dowell	20	263–264	.499
4	1968–1979	Gary Colson	11	153–137	.528
5	1979–1988	Jim Harrick	9	167–97	.633
6	1988–1994; 2008–2011	Tom Asbury	9	153–127	.546
7	1994–1996 (Note: Fuller resigned in January 1996. Marty Wilson served as interim head coach for the remainder of the 1995–96 season.)	Tony Fuller	2	15–27	.357
8	1996–1999; 2018–present	Lorenzo Romar	8	105–137	.434
9	1999–2001	Jan van Breda Kolff	2	47–18	.723
10	2001–2006	Paul Westphal	5	76–72	.514
11	2006–2008 (Note: Walberg resigned in January 2008. Eric Bridgeland served as interim head coach for the remainder of the 2007–08 season.)	Vance Walberg	2	14–35	.286
12	2008*	Eric Bridgeland	1	5–9	.357
13	1996*; 2011–2018	Marty Wilson	8	91–139	.396
Totals		13 coaches	85 seasons	1,281–1,177	.521
Records updated through end of 2022–23 season * - Denotes interim head coach. Source
