= 1952 Cal Poly San Dimas Broncos football team =

American college football season

1952 Cal Poly San Dimas Broncos football
- Conference: Independent
- Record: 4–4
- Head coach: Duane Whitehead (4th season)

1952 Western college football independents records
	Conf.			Overall
Team	W	L	T	W		L		T
Fresno State		–		8	–	2	–	0
Pacific (CA)		–		7	–	3	–	1
San Jose State		–		6	–	3	–	0
La Verne		–		5	–	3	–	1
Hawaii		–		5	–	5	–	2
Cal Poly San Dimas		–		4	–	4	–	0
Nevada		–		2	–	2	–	0
Santa Clara		–		2	–	6	–	1

The 1952 Cal Poly San Dimas Broncos football team represented the Cal Poly Kellogg-Voorhis Unit—now known as California State Polytechnic University, Pomona—as an independent during the 1952 college football season. Led by Duane Whitehead in his fourth and final season as head coach, Cal Poly San Dimas compiled a record of 4–4. The team was outscored by its opponents 224 to 159 for the season.

Whitehead served as the Broncos' head coach from 1948 to 1950, but had been replaced by Don Rees for the 1951 season. He finished his tenure at Cal Poly San Dimas with an overall record of 13–22–1, for a .375 winning percentage.

== Schedule ==
Date	Opponent	Site	Result	Source
? (Note: Both cfbwarehouse.com and the PDF published by Cal Poly Pomona list a game vs. Palomar JC in 1952, but no contemporaneous newspaper article has been located.)	Palomar	?	W 40–6	
September 26	at Chaffey	Ontario, CA	L 0–48	
October 4	Imperial Valley	Covina High School; Covina, CA	L 7–13	
October 11	Oceanside-Carlsbad	Bonita High School; La Verne, CA	W 40–13	
October 24	La Verne	Bonita High School; La Verne, CA	L 21–28	
November 1	at Humboldt State	Albee Stadium; Eureka, CA	L 0–72	
November 14	at Cal Poly freshmen	San Luis Obispo, CA	no record (Note: Both cfbwarehouse.com and the PDF published by Cal Poly Pomona do not list this game. No record of the result of this game has been located.)	
November 21	Caltech	Covina High School; Covina, CA	W 19–18	
November 27	at Citrus	Glendora, CA	W 32–26	
