= 1952 Idaho Vandals football team =

American college football season

1952 Idaho Vandals football
- Conference: Pacific Coast Conference
- Record: 4–4–1 (1–3 PCC)
- Head coach: Raymond A. Curfman (2nd season)
- Offensive scheme: Split-T
- Home stadium: Neale Stadium

1952 Pacific Coast Conference football standings
	Conf.					Overall
Team	W		L		T	W		L		T
No. 5 USC $	6	–	0	–	0	10	–	1	–	0
No. 6 UCLA	5	–	1	–	0	8	–	1	–	0
Washington	6	–	2	–	0	7	–	3	–	0
California	3	–	3	–	0	7	–	3	–	0
Washington State	3	–	4	–	0	4	–	6	–	0
Stanford	2	–	5	–	0	5	–	5	–	0
Oregon	2	–	5	–	0	2	–	7	–	1
Idaho	1	–	3	–	0	4	–	4	–	1
Oregon State	1	–	6	–	0	2	–	7	–	0
$ – Conference champion; Rankings from AP Poll

The 1952 Idaho Vandals football team represented the University of Idaho in the 1952 college football season. The Vandals were led by second-year head coach Raymond A. Curfman and were members of the Pacific Coast Conference. Home games were played on campus at Neale Stadium in Moscow, with one game in Boise at old Bronco Stadium at Boise Junior College.

Led on the field by quarterback Wayne D. Anderson, Idaho compiled a 4–4–1 overall record and were 1–3 in the PCC.

In the home opener against Oregon on October 4, Idaho outplayed the visitors for 56 minutes, but gave up two late touchdowns and lost by six.

The Vandals suffered a second straight loss in the Battle of the Palouse with neighbor Washington State, falling 36–6 at Rogers Field in Pullman on November 1. The previous two editions had been competitive, with a 7–7 tie in 1950 and 9–6 battle in Moscow in 1951. The loss prevented the first winning season for Idaho football since 1938. It ran the winless streak against the Cougars to 26 games, a record of 0–24–2 since taking three straight in 1923–25; the Vandals broke the streak two years later in Pullman.

Idaho regrouped and concluded the season with two convincing wins over Montana at home and Oregon State in Corvallis in the last varsity game played at Bell Field.

Following his playing days, Anderson was a head coach for the Vandals in baseball (1958–66) and basketball (1966–74); he was also an assistant athletic director (1971–74, 1982–94).

== Schedule ==
Date	Time	Opponent	Site	Result	Attendance	Source
September 20	1:00 pm	at Washington	Husky Stadium; Seattle, WA	L 14–39	31,912	
September 27	1:00 pm	vs. Utah*	old Bronco Stadium; Boise, ID	T 21–21	9,500	
October 4	2:00 pm	Oregon^{†}	Neale Stadium; Moscow, ID	L 14–20	11,542	
October 11	12:30 pm	at Utah State*	old Romney Stadium; Logan, UT	W 6–3		
October 18	2:00 pm	North Dakota State*	Neale Stadium; Moscow, ID	W 54–9	11,000	
October 24	8:00 pm	vs. Santa Clara*	Kezar Stadium; San Francisco, CA	L 7–9	5,000	
November 1	1:30 pm	at Washington State	Rogers Field; Pullman, WA (Battle of the Palouse)	L 6–36	14,000	
November 8	1:30 pm	Montana*	Neale Stadium; Moscow, ID (Little Brown Stein)	W 27–0	4,000	
November 15	1:30 pm	at Oregon State	Bell Field; Corvallis, OR	W 27–6	8,000	
*Non-conference game; ^{†}Homecoming; All times are in Pacific time

== Coaching staff ==
- John Nikcevich, guards
- Mack Flenniken, ends
- Chuck Gottfried, tackles
- Art Smith, freshmen

== All-conference ==
No Vandals were on the All-PCC team; honorable mention on defense were end Ray Lewis, tackle Don Ringe, and linebacker Bob Holder.

== NFL draft ==
One senior from the 1952 Vandals was selected in the 1953 NFL draft:

Player	Position	Round	Pick	Franchise
Don Ringe	T	26th	303	Chicago Cardinals

One junior was selected in the 1954 NFL draft:

Player	Position	Round	Pick	Franchise
Mel Bertrand	C	29th	349	Detroit Lions

One sophomore was selected in the 1955 NFL draft:

Player	Position	Round	Pick	Franchise
Burdette Hess	G	15th	178	San Francisco 49ers

- Often incorrectly listed as a UI Vandal, tackle Norm Hayes (1954 draft, #217) played at the College of Idaho in Caldwell.
