= 1952 New Mexico A&M Aggies football team =

American college football season

1952 New Mexico A&M Aggies football
- Conference: Border Conference
- Record: 2–6–1 (1–2–1 Border)
- Head coach: Joseph T. Coleman (2nd season)
- Home stadium: Memorial Stadium

1952 Border Conference football standings
	Conf.					Overall
Team	W		L		T	W		L		T
Arizona State $	4	–	0	–	0	6	–	3	–	0
Texas Tech	2	–	1	–	1	3	–	7	–	1
Arizona	3	–	2	–	0	6	–	4	–	0
Hardin–Simmons	2	–	2	–	1	5	–	3	–	2
Texas Western	2	–	3	–	1	5	–	5	–	1
New Mexico A&M	1	–	2	–	1	2	–	6	–	1
West Texas State	1	–	4	–	0	3	–	6	–	0
Arizona State–Flagstaff	0	–	1	–	0	3	–	4	–	0
$ – Conference champion

The 1952 New Mexico A&M Aggies football team was an American football team that represented New Mexico College of Agriculture and Mechanical Arts (now known as New Mexico State University) as a member of the Border Conference during the 1952 college football season. In their second and final year under head coach Joseph T. Coleman, the Aggies compiled a 2–6–1 record (1–2–1 against conference opponents), finished sixth in the conference, and were outscored by a total of 255 to 118. The team played home games at Memorial Stadium in Las Cruces, New Mexico.

== Schedule ==
Date	Time	Opponent	Site	Result	Attendance	Source
September 20		Howard Payne*	Memorial Stadium; Las Cruces, NM	W 20–7		
September 27		at Arizona	Arizona Stadium; Tucson, AZ	L 12–62	17,500	
October 4		at New Mexico*	Zimmerman Field; Albuquerque, NM (rivalry)	L 0–23	8,500	
October 11		at West Texas State	Buffalo Stadium; Canyon, TX	L 7–45		
October 18		Texas Western	Memorial Stadium; Las Cruces, NM (rivalry)	T 20–20		
November 1		at Arizona State–Flagstaff	Skidmore Field; Flagstaff, AZ	W 33–9		
November 8		McMurry*	Memorial Stadium; Las Cruces, NM	L 14–27	2,000	
November 15		at Midwestern (TX)*	Coyote Stadium; Wichita Falls, TX	L 6–28	8,500	
November 27	1:30 p.m.	at Wichita*	Veterans Field; Wichita, KS	L 6–34	3,000	
*Non-conference game; All times are in Mountain time
