= 1952 San Diego State Aztecs football team =

American college football season

1952 San Diego State Aztecs football
- Conference: California Collegiate Athletic Association
- Record: 4–5 (2–2 CCAA)
- Head coach: Bill Schutte (6th season)
- Home stadium: Aztec Bowl, Balboa Stadium

1952 California Collegiate Athletic Association football standings
	Conf.					Overall
Team	W		L		T	W		L		T
Cal Poly $	4	–	0	–	0	7	–	3	–	0
Santa Barbara	3	–	1	–	0	8	–	2	–	0
San Diego State	2	–	2	–	0	4	–	5	–	0
Los Angeles State	1	–	3	–	0	4	–	4	–	0
Pepperdine	0	–	4	–	0	2	–	7	–	0
$ – Conference champion

The 1952 San Diego State Aztecs football team represented San Diego State College (Note: San Diego State University was known as San Diego State College from 1935 to 1971.) during the 1952 college football season.

San Diego State competed in the California Collegiate Athletic Association (CCAA). The team was led by sixth-year head coach Bill Schutte, and played home games at both Aztec Bowl and Balboa Stadium. They finished the season with four wins and five losses (4–5, 2–2 CCAA). Overall, the team was outscored by its opponents 238–267 for the season.

== Schedule ==
Date	Opponent	Site	Result	Attendance	Source
September 27	San Jose State*	Aztec Bowl; San Diego, CA	L 6–47	8,500	
October 4	at Cal Poly	Mustang Stadium; San Luis Obispo, CA	L 18–20	5,000	
October 11	Pepperdine	Balboa Stadium; San Diego, CA	W 33–13	5,000	
October 18	Redlands*	Aztec Bowl; San Diego, CA	W 27–12	5,000	
October 25	Los Angeles State	Aztec Bowl; San Diego, CA	W 41–26	5,000	
November 1	Fresno State*	Balboa Stadium; San Diego, CA (rivalry)	L 33–49	18,000	
November 8	San Francisco State*	Aztec Bowl; San Diego, CA	W 39–28	5,000	
November 17	San Diego Marines (Note: The Marine Corps Recruit Depot (MCRD) in San Diego fielded a team that played against colleges and other military teams from 1922 to 1964.)*	Aztec Bowl; San Diego, CA	L 21–51	8,000	
November 21	at Santa Barbara	La Playa Stadium; Santa Barbara, CA	L 20–21	5,500	
*Non-conference game

== Team players in the NFL ==
The following San Diego State players were selected in the 1953 NFL draft.

Player	Position	Round	Overall	NFL team
Hugh Latham	Tackle	17	201	San Francisco 49ers
Paul Held	Quarterback	19	229	Detroit Lions
