= 1952 Montana Grizzlies football team =

American college football season

1952 Montana Grizzlies football
- Conference: Skyline Conference
- Record: 2–7–1 (1–5 Skyline)
- Head coach: Ed Chinske (1st season)
- Home stadium: Dornblaser Field

1952 Skyline Conference football standings
| | Conf. | | | | | Overall |
| Team | W | | L | | T | W | | L | | T |
|---|---|---|---|---|---|---|---|---|---|---|
| Utah $ | 5 | – | 0 | – | 0 | 6 | – | 3 | – | 1 |
| New Mexico | 5 | – | 1 | – | 0 | 7 | – | 2 | – | 0 |
| Colorado A&M | 5 | – | 2 | – | 0 | 6 | – | 4 | – | 0 |
| Wyoming | 4 | – | 3 | – | 0 | 5 | – | 4 | – | 0 |
| BYU | 3 | – | 4 | – | 0 | 4 | – | 6 | – | 0 |
| Utah State | 3 | – | 4 | – | 0 | 3 | – | 7 | – | 1 |
| Montana | 1 | – | 5 | – | 0 | 2 | – | 7 | – | 1 |
| Denver | 0 | – | 7 | – | 0 | 3 | – | 7 | – | 0 |
$ – Conference champion

The 1952 Montana Grizzlies football team represented the University of Montana in the 1952 college football season as a member of the Skyline Conference. The Grizzlies were led by first-year head coach Ed Chinske, played their home games at Dornblaser Field and finished the season with a record of two wins, seven losses and one tie (2–7–1, 1–5 Skyline).

== Schedule ==
| Date | Opponent | Site | Result | Attendance | Source |
|---|---|---|---|---|---|
| September 20 | Utah State | Dornblaser Field; Missoula, MT | L 0–7 | | |
| September 27 | at Wyoming | War Memorial Stadium; Laramie, WY | L 0–14 | 10,676 | |
| October 4 | BYU^{†} | Dornblaser Field; Missoula, MT | L 7–28 | | |
| October 11 | at Denver | Hilltop Stadium; Denver, CO | W 17–7 | | |
| October 18 | at Colorado A&M | Colorado Field; Fort Collins, CO | L 0–41 | 12,000 | |
| October 25 | at Oregon* | Hayward Field; Eugene, OR | T 14–14 | 9,000 | |
| November 1 | Montana State* | Dornblaser Field; Missoula, MT (rivalry) | W 35–12 | | |
| November 8 | at Idaho* | Neale Stadium; Moscow, ID (Little Brown Stein) | L 0–27 | 4,000 | |
| November 14 | at San Jose State* | Spartan Stadium; San Jose, CA | L 20–39 | | |
| November 22 | at New Mexico | Zimmerman Field; Albuquerque, NM | L 6–12 | 10,000 | |
*Non-conference game; ^{†}Homecoming

== After the season ==
The following Grizzlies were selected in the 1952 NFL draft after the season.

| Round | Pick | Player | Position | NFL club |
|---|---|---|---|---|
| 28 | 336 | Jim Murray | Tackle | Los Angeles Rams |
| 30 | 360 | Hal Maus | End | Detroit Lions |
