= 1952 USC Trojans football team =

American college football season

1952 USC Trojans football

PCC champion Rose Bowl champion

Rose Bowl, W 7–0 vs. Wisconsin
- Conference: Pacific Coast Conference

Ranking
- Coaches: No. 4
- AP: No. 5
- Record: 10–1 (6–0 PCC)
- Head coach: Jess Hill (2nd season)
- Home stadium: Los Angeles Memorial Coliseum

1952 Pacific Coast Conference football standings
	Conf.					Overall
Team	W		L		T	W		L		T
No. 5 USC $	6	–	0	–	0	10	–	1	–	0
No. 6 UCLA	5	–	1	–	0	8	–	1	–	0
Washington	6	–	2	–	0	7	–	3	–	0
California	3	–	3	–	0	7	–	3	–	0
Washington State	3	–	4	–	0	4	–	6	–	0
Stanford	2	–	5	–	0	5	–	5	–	0
Oregon	2	–	5	–	0	2	–	7	–	1
Idaho	1	–	3	–	0	4	–	4	–	1
Oregon State	1	–	6	–	0	2	–	7	–	0
$ – Conference champion; Rankings from AP Poll

The 1952 USC Trojans football team represented the University of Southern California (USC) in the 1952 college football season. In their second year under head coach Jess Hill, the Trojans compiled a 10–1 record (6–0 against conference opponents), won the Pacific Coast Conference championship, and outscored their opponents by a combined total of 254 to 47.

The Trojans finished the season ranked No. 4 in the final United Press Coaches Poll and No. 5 in the final AP poll. They faced five ranked opponents during the 1952 season and won four of those games: a 10–0 victory over No. 4 California on October 25; a 33–0 victory over No. 17 Washington on November 15; a 14–12 victory over No. 3 UCLA on November 22; a 9–0 loss to Notre Dame on November 29; and a 7–0 victory over Wisconsin in the 1953 Rose Bowl. USC's victory in the Rose Bowl was the first for the Pacific Coast Conference after seven consecutive losses to the representatives of the Big Ten Conference.

Jim Sears led the team in passing with 51 of 105 passes completed for 739 yards, eight touchdowns and eight interceptions. Leon Sellers led the team in rushing with 103 carries for 386 yards and two touchdowns. Leon Clarke was the leading receiver with 25 catches for 372 yards and three touchdowns.

Eight Trojans received honors from the Associated Press (AP), United Press (UP), or International News Service (INS) on the 1952 All-Pacific Coast Conference football team: back Jim Sears (AP-1 [safety]; INS-1; UP-1 [halfback]); back Lindon Crow (AP-1 [defensive back]); defensive end Bob Hooks, USC (AP-1); tackle Robert Van Doren, USC (AP-1 [defensive tackle]; INS-1; UP-1); guard Elmer Willhoite, USC (AP-1 [defensive guard]; INS-1; UP-1); guard Marv Goux, USC (INS-1); center Lou Welsh, USC (AP-1); and linebacker George Timberlake, USC (AP-1). Sears and Wilhoite were also consensus All-Americans.

== Schedule ==
Date	Opponent	Rank	Site	Result	Attendance	Source
September 19	vs. No. 15 Washington State	No. 16	Los Angeles Memorial Coliseum; Los Angeles, CA	W 35–7	58,288	
September 26	Northwestern*	No. 16	Los Angeles Memorial Coliseum; Los Angeles, CA	W 31–0	59,756	
October 4	Army*	No. 7	Los Angeles Memorial Coliseum; Los Angeles, CA	W 22–0	48,433	
October 10	San Diego NTC*	No. 7	Los Angeles Memorial Coliseum; Los Angeles, CA	W 20–6	40,137	
October 18	vs. Oregon State	No. 7	Multnomah Stadium; Portland, OR	W 28–6	17,438	
October 25	No. 4 California^{†}	No. 7	Los Angeles Memorial Coliseum; Los Angeles, CA	W 10–0	94,677	
November 8	at Stanford	No. 6	Stanford Stadium; Stanford, CA (rivalry)	W 54–7	45,000	
November 15	No. 17 Washington	No. 5	Los Angeles Memorial Coliseum; Los Angeles, CA	W 33–0	35,852	
November 22	at No. 3 UCLA	No. 4	Los Angeles Memorial Coliseum; Los Angeles, CA (Victory Bell)	W 14–12	96,869	
November 29	at No. 7 Notre Dame*	No. 2	Notre Dame Stadium; Notre Dame, IN (rivalry)	L 0–9	58,394	
January 1, 1953	vs. No. 11 Wisconsin*	No. 5	Rose Bowl; Pasadena, CA (Rose Bowl)	W 7–0	101,500	
*Non-conference game; ^{†}Homecoming; Rankings from AP Poll released prior to the game; Source:

== Players ==
The following players were members of the 1952 USC Trojans football team.

- Charlie Ane Jr., 6'2", 254 pounds, right guard (offense and defense), #60, Honolulu, Hawaii (All-PCC UP-2)
- Al Barry, 6'2", 221 pounds, right tackle (offense and defense), #79, Los Angeles (Honorable-mention All-PCC AP)
- George Bozanic, 6'2", 207 pounds, quarterback (offense) and linebacker (defense), #38, Lander, Wyoming
- Rudy Bukich, 6'1", 186 pounds, left halfback (offense), #18, St. Louis, Missouri (Outstanding Player, 1953 Rose Bowl)
- Al Carmichael, 6'0", 185 pounds, right halfback (offense), #21, Hawthorne, California (All-PCC UP-2)
- Bob Cox, 5'8", 183 pounds, right guard (offense), #62, Pasadena, California
- Lindon Crow, 6'1", 191 pounds, right halfback (offense and defense), #36, Corcoran, California
- Aramis Dandoy, 5'11", 182 pounds, right halfback (offense), #27, Torrance, California
- Ed Fouch, 6'3", 229 pounds, tackle (offense and defense), #49, Santa Ana, California
- Marvin Goux, 5'10", 181 pounds, linebacker (defense), #20, Santa Barbara, California (All-PCC UP-3
- Harold Han, 5'9", 189 pounds, fullback and safety, #46, Honolulu, Hawaii
- Bill Hattig, 5'9", 164 pounds, left end (offense and defense), #86, Los Angeles
- Addison Hawthorne, 5'10", 194 pounds, fullback and safety, #23, Los Angeles
- Bob Hooks, 6'3", 206 pounds, right end (defense), #58, Los Angeles (AP All-Coast Defensive Team)
- Des Koch, 6'1", 207 pounds, tailback (offense), #43, Shelton, Washington (nation's leading punter with 43.4 yard average)
- Ron Miller, 6'4", 204 pounds, left end (offense), #88, Los Angeles
- Tom Nickoloff, 6'3", 218 pounds, right end (offense), #80, Los Angeles
- Dick Nunis, 6'0", 182 pounds, right halfback (defense), #26, Los Angeles
- Dick Petty, 6'0", 190 pounds, center (offense) and end (defense), #54, Los Angeles
- Bob Peviani, 6'1", 212 pounds, left guard (defense), #66, Los Angeles (John Dye Memorial Award as the "outstanding lineman")
- Jim Psaltis, 6'1", 186 pounds, left halfback, safety (defense), #37, Oakland, California (AP All-Coast Defensive team; led nation with nine interceptions)
- Ed Pucci, 6'0", 209 pounds, left guard (offense), #64, Canton, Ohio
- Bill Riddle, 6'0", 190 pounds, quarterback (offense), linebacker (defense), #52, El Centro, California
- Jim Sears, 5'9", 165 pounds, halfback (offense) and safety (defense), #32 (won W. J. Voit Memorial Trophy; nation's leading punt returner with 15.9 yard average; led the Trojans in total yardage and passes completed; first-team All-American selection by AP, INS, NEA, and Look magazine)
- Leon Sellers, 6'0", 194 pounds, fullback (offense), #44, Upland, California
- Don Stillwell, 6'0", 183 pounds, left end (offense), #84, San Francisco
- Sam "The Toe" Tsagalakis
- George Timberlake, 6'0", 207 pounds, linebacker (defense), #56, Long Beach, California (AP All-Coast Defensive Team)
- Bob Van Doren, 6'3-1/2", 203 pounds, right tackle (defense) and defensive captain, #75, San Diego (UP All-PCC first team; UP All-American third team)
- Chuck Weeks, 6'2", 219 pounds, right tackle (offense), #72, Columbus, Ohio
- Harry Welsh, 5'10", 168 pounds, halfback (defense), #25, Akron, Ohio
- Lou Welsh, 6'1", 193 pounds, center (offense), #50, Ontario, California(selected as USC's "most inspirational" player)
- Elmer Wilhoite, left guard (offense and defense), 6'1", 217 pounds, #73 (first-team All-American pick by UP, INS, NEA, Look magazine, and Collier's Weekly

== Coaching staff and other personnel ==
- Head coach: Jess Hill
- Assistant coaches: Mel Hein (line); Joe Muha (backfield); Don Clark (line); Bill Fisk (ends); Walter Hargesheimer (backs); Jess Mortensen (freshman coach)
- Senior manager: John Broadbent
- Yell Kings: Al Gallion, Bob Arnett, Jim Strode, Larry Stone, and Dick Chapman
