= 1952 Fresno State Bulldogs football team =

American college football season

1952 Fresno State Bulldogs football
- Conference: Independent
- Record: 8–2
- Head coach: Clark Van Galder (1st season)
- Home stadium: Ratcliffe Stadium

1952 Western college football independents records
	Conf.			Overall
Team	W	L	T	W		L		T
Fresno State		–		8	–	2	–	0
Pacific (CA)		–		7	–	3	–	1
San Jose State		–		6	–	3	–	0
La Verne		–		5	–	3	–	1
Hawaii		–		5	–	5	–	2
Cal Poly San Dimas		–		4	–	4	–	0
Nevada		–		2	–	2	–	0
Santa Clara		–		2	–	6	–	1

The 1952 Fresno State Bulldogs football team represented Fresno State College—now known as California State University, Fresno—as an independent during the 1952 college football season. Led by first-year head coach Clark Van Galder, the Bulldogs compiled a record of 8–2. Fresno State played home games at Ratcliffe Stadium on the campus of Fresno City College in Fresno, California.

== Schedule ==
Date	Opponent	Site	Result	Attendance	Source
September 20	Cal Aggies	Ratcliffe Stadium; Fresno, CA	W 41–7	7,524	
October 4	Pepperdine	Ratcliffe Stadium; Fresno, CA	W 60–7	8,198	
October 10	at San Jose State	Spartan Stadium; San Jose, CA (rivalry)	L 6–40		
October 18	Utah State	Ratcliffe Stadium; Fresno, CA	W 27–21	9,266–13,000	
October 24	at Occidental	Occidental Stadium; Los Angeles, CA	W 20–9		
November 1	at San Diego State	Balboa Stadium; San Diego, CA (rivalry)	W 49–33	18,000	
November 8	at Nevada	Mackay Stadium (Note: This stadium is the predecessor to the current Mackay Stadium, which was opened for the 1966 season.); Reno, NV	W 59–32		
November 15	Pacific (CA)	Ratcliffe Stadium; Fresno, CA	L 0–50	7,155	
November 22	San Francisco State	Ratcliffe Stadium; Fresno, CA	W 48–20	5,119	
November 29	Whittier	Ratcliffe Stadium; Fresno, CA	W 21–14	5,949	

== Team players in the NFL ==
The following were selected in the 1953 NFL draft.

Player	Position	Round	Overall	NFL team
Larry Willoughby	Back	23	276	Los Angeles Rams
