= 1952 Utah Utes football team =

American college football season

1952 Utah Utes football

Skyline champion
- Conference: Skyline Conference
- Record: 6–3–1 (5–0 Skyline)
- Head coach: Jack Curtice (3rd season)
- Home stadium: Ute Stadium

1952 Skyline Conference football standings
	Conf.					Overall
Team	W		L		T	W		L		T
Utah $	5	–	0	–	0	6	–	3	–	1
New Mexico	5	–	1	–	0	7	–	2	–	0
Colorado A&M	5	–	2	–	0	6	–	4	–	0
Wyoming	4	–	3	–	0	5	–	4	–	0
BYU	3	–	4	–	0	4	–	6	–	0
Utah State	3	–	4	–	0	3	–	7	–	1
Montana	1	–	5	–	0	2	–	7	–	1
Denver	0	–	7	–	0	3	–	7	–	0
$ – Conference champion

The 1952 Utah Utes football team, or also commonly known as the Utah Redskins, was an American football team that represented the University of Utah as a member of the Skyline Conference during the 1952 college football season. In their third season under head coach Jack Curtice, the Utes compiled an overall record of 6–3–1 with a mark of 5–0 against conference opponents, winning Skyline title for the second consecutive year.

== Schedule ==
Date	Opponent	Site	Result	Attendance	Source
September 20	Oregon State*	Ute Stadium; Salt Lake City, UT	L 7–14	15,000	
September 27	vs. Idaho*	Old Bronco Stadium; Boise, ID	T 21–21	9,500	
October 4	Arizona*	Ute Stadium; Salt Lake City, UT	L 0–27		
October 11	BYU	Ute Stadium; Salt Lake City, UT (rivalry)	W 34–6		
October 18	at Denver	Hilltop Stadium; Denver, CO	W 35–0	6,574	
October 25	at Wyoming	War Memorial Stadium; Laramie, WY	W 27–21		
November 1	Colorado*^{†}	Ute Stadium; Salt Lake City, UT (rivalry)	L 14–20	15,300	
November 8	at Colorado A&M	Colorado Field; Fort Collins, CO	W 14–6	12,500	
November 15	at Santa Clara*	Hughes Memorial Stadium; Sacramento, CA	W 16–13	5,253	
November 27	Utah State	Ute Stadium; Salt Lake City, UT (rivalry)	W 20–0	13,090	
*Non-conference game; ^{†}Homecoming

== NFL draft ==
Utah had three players selected in the 1953 NFL draft.

Player	Position	Round	Pick	NFL team
Ray Westort	Guard	13	153	Philadelphia Eagles
George Bean	Back	17	203	Cleveland Browns
Joe Curtis	End	21	244	Chicago Cardinals
