= 1952 Pepperdine Waves football team =

American college football season

1952 Pepperdine Waves football
- Conference: California Collegiate Athletic Association
- Record: 2–7 (0–4 CCAA)
- Head coach: Duck Dowell (2nd season)
- Home stadium: El Camino Stadium

1952 California Collegiate Athletic Association football standings
	Conf.					Overall
Team	W		L		T	W		L		T
Cal Poly $	4	–	0	–	0	7	–	3	–	0
Santa Barbara	3	–	1	–	0	8	–	2	–	0
San Diego State	2	–	2	–	0	4	–	5	–	0
Los Angeles State	1	–	3	–	0	4	–	4	–	0
Pepperdine	0	–	4	–	0	2	–	7	–	0
$ – Conference champion

The 1952 Pepperdine Waves football team represented George Pepperdine College (Note: Pepperdine University was known as George Pepperdine College from 1937 to 1970.) as a member of the California Collegiate Athletic Association (CCAA) during the 1952 college football season. The team was led by second-year head coach Duck Dowell and played home games at El Camino Stadium on the campus of El Camino College in Torrance, California. They finished the season with an overall record of 2–7 and a mark of 0–4 in conference play, placing last out of five teams in the CCAA.

== Schedule ==
Date	Opponent	Site	Result	Attendance	Source
September 26	at San Francisco State*	Cox Stadium; San Francisco, CA	L 0–21		
October 4	at Fresno State	Ratcliffe Stadium; Fresno, CA	L 7–60	8,198	
October 11	at San Diego State	Balboa Stadium; San Diego, CA	L 13–33	5,000	
October 17	Terminal Island Navy (Note: Naval Air Station Terminal Island was one of several names for the Naval air station and repair facility located on Terminal Island in Los Angeles County, California from 1938 to 1997)*	El Camino Stadium; Torrance, CA	W 33–14		
October 25	at Cal Poly	Mustang Stadium; San Luis Obispo, CA	L 13–39		
October 31	Point Mugu Navy (Note: Naval Air Station Point Mugu was a Naval air station located in Ventura County, California from 1942 to 2000)*	El Camino Stadium; Torrance, CA	W 14–0	1,200	
November 7	Santa Barbara	El Camino Stadium; Torrance, CA	L 6–27		
November 15	at Humboldt State*	Redwood Bowl; Arcata, CA	L 7–41		
November 21	Los Angeles State*	El Camino Stadium; Torrance, CA ("Old Shoe" rivalry)	L 0–13	3,500	
*Non-conference game
