= 1952 Hawaii Rainbows football team =

American college football season

1952 Hawaii Rainbows football
- Conference: Independent
- Record: 5–5–2
- Head coach: Hank Vasconcellos (1st season)
- Home stadium: Honolulu Stadium

1952 Western college football independents records
	Conf.			Overall
Team	W	L	T	W		L		T
Fresno State		–		8	–	2	–	0
Pacific (CA)		–		7	–	3	–	1
San Jose State		–		6	–	3	–	0
La Verne		–		5	–	3	–	1
Hawaii		–		5	–	5	–	2
Cal Poly San Dimas		–		4	–	4	–	0
Nevada		–		2	–	2	–	0
Santa Clara		–		2	–	6	–	1

The 1952 Hawaii Rainbows football team represented the University of Hawaiʻi at Mānoa as an independent during the 1952 college football season. In their first season under head coach Hank Vasconcellos, the Rainbows compiled a 5–5–2 record.

== Schedule ==
Date	Opponent	Site	Result	Attendance	Source
September 12	Honolulu Town Team	Honolulu Stadium; Honolulu, Territory of Hawaii	W 42–0	20,000	
September 20	at Arizona	Arizona Stadium; Tucson, AZ	L 7–57	18,000	
September 26	at Lewis & Clark	Multnomah Stadium; Portland, OR	W 21–20	3,700	
October 4	at Texas Western	Kidd Field; El Paso, TX	L 26–42	10,000	
October 15	Hawaiian Athletic Club	Honolulu Stadium; Honolulu, Territory of Hawaii	W 47–0		
October 22	Barbers Point NAS	Honolulu Stadium; Honolulu, Territory of Hawaii	W 40–20		
October 30	Hawaii 49ers	Honolulu Stadium; Honolulu, Territory of Hawaii	T 21–21	9,000	
November 5	Honolulu Town Team	Honolulu Stadium; Honolulu, Territory of Hawaii	W 40–7	900	
November 16	Hawaii 49ers	Honolulu Stadium; Honolulu, Territory of Hawaii	L 14–41		
November 28	Willamette^{†}	Honolulu Stadium; Honolulu, Territory of Hawaii	T 7–7	8,500	
December 5	Pacific (CA)	Honolulu Stadium; Honolulu, Territory of Hawaii	L 13–49	7,000	
December 13	Barbers Point NAS	Honolulu Stadium; Honolulu, Territory of Hawaii	L 7–16		
^{†}Homecoming
