= 1952 Arizona State Sun Devils football team =

American college football season

1952 Arizona State Sun Devils football

Border champion
- Conference: Border Conference
- Record: 6–3 (4–0 Border)
- Head coach: Clyde B. Smith (1st season)
- Home stadium: Goodwin Stadium

1952 Border Conference football standings
	Conf.					Overall
Team	W		L		T	W		L		T
Arizona State $	4	–	0	–	0	6	–	3	–	0
Texas Tech	2	–	1	–	1	3	–	7	–	1
Arizona	3	–	2	–	0	6	–	4	–	0
Hardin–Simmons	2	–	2	–	1	5	–	3	–	2
Texas Western	2	–	3	–	1	5	–	5	–	1
New Mexico A&M	1	–	2	–	1	2	–	6	–	1
West Texas State	1	–	4	–	0	3	–	6	–	0
Arizona State–Flagstaff	0	–	1	–	0	3	–	4	–	0
$ – Conference champion

The 1952 Arizona State Sun Devils football team was an American football team that represented Arizona State College (later renamed Arizona State University) in the Border Conference during the 1952 college football season. In their first season under head coach Clyde B. Smith, the Sun Devils compiled a 6–3 record (4–0 against Border opponents) and outscored their opponents by a combined total of 247 to 121.

== Schedule ==
Date	Time	Opponent	Site	Result	Attendance	Source
September 20	7:00 p.m.	at Hardin–Simmons	Parramore Field; Abilene, TX	W 26–7		
September 27		Colorado A&M*	Goodwin Stadium; Tempe, AZ	W 40–14		
October 4		San Jose State*	Goodwin Stadium; Tempe, AZ	L 14–21		
October 18	8:00 p.m.	West Texas State	Goodwin Stadium; Tempe, AZ	W 48–14	13,000	
October 25		Houston*	Goodwin Stadium; Tempe, AZ	L 0–6	15,000	
November 8		at Arizona	Arizona Stadium; Tucson, AZ (rivalry)	W 20–18	27,000	
November 15		San Diego NAS*	Goodwin Stadium; Tempe, AZ	L 13–35		
November 22		Texas Western^{†}	Goodwin Stadium; Tempe, AZ	W 39–0	13,000	
November 29		BYU*	Goodwin Stadium; Tempe, AZ	W 47–6	12,000	
*Non-conference game; ^{†}Homecoming; All times are in Mountain time
