= John Pederson (coach) =

American football player and coach (1919–1976)

Biographical details
- Born: May 18, 1919; Milwaukee, Wisconsin, U.S.
- Died: October 7, 1976 (aged 57); Flagstaff, Arizona, U.S.

Playing career

Football
- c. 1940: La Crosse State
- Position: center

Coaching career (HC unless noted)

Football
- 1949: Indiana (assistant)
- 1950: Arizona State–Flagstaff (line)
- 1951–1953: Arizona State–Flagstaff

Skiing
- 1945–1946: Colorado
- 1950–?: Arizona State–Flagstaff

Swimming
- 1945–1946: Colorado

Head coaching record
- Overall: 7–16 (football)

John N. Pederson (May 18, 1919 – October 7, 1976) was an American football, skiing, and swimming coach, educator, and civic leader. He served as the head football coach at Arizona State College at Flagstaff—now known as Northern Arizona University—from 1951 to 1953, compiling a record of 7–16.

Pederson was born on May 18, 1919, in Milwaukee. He attended high school in West Allis, Wisconsin and then moved on to La Crosse State Teachers College—now known as the University of Wisconsin–La Crosse—where he played college football as a center and was a member of the school's swimming team. He served in the United States Army during World War II, enlisting as a private in 1941. He served two years with the ski troops at Camp Hale in Colorado and then overseas, before being discharged as a first lieutenant in 1945.

Pederson coached skiing and swimming at the University of Colorado Boulder in 1945–46 while earning a Master of Education degree. In 1949, he went to the Indiana University Bloomington to work as an assistant football coach, teach swimming, and pursue a Doctor of Physical Education degree. In the spring of 1950, Pederson was hired by Arizona State College at Flagstaff as head skiing coach and line coach for the football team to assist head coach Ben Reiges.

Pederson was elected to the city council of Flagstaff, Arizona, in 1964 and served a two-year term as a councilman. He remained a member of Northern Arizona University's physical education department faculty until his death on October 7, 1976. He died at the activity center on the university's campus in Flagstaff, after suffering a heart attack while playing racquetball.

== Head coaching record ==
=== Football ===
Year	Team	Overall	Conference	Standing	Bowl/playoffs
Arizona State Flagstaff–Lumberjacks (Border Conference) (1951–1952)
1951	Arizona State–Flagstaff	1–7	0–1	8th	
1952	Arizona State–Flagstaff	2–4	0–1	8th	
Arizona State Flagstaff–Lumberjacks (New Mexico Conference) (1953)
1953	Arizona State–Flagstaff	4–5	3–3	T–3rd	
Arizona State–Flagstaff:		7–16	3–5		
Total:		7–16			
