= 1952 Utah State Aggies football team =

American college football season

1952 Utah State Aggies football
- Conference: Skyline Conference
- Record: 3–7–1 (3–4 Skyline)
- Head coach: John Roning (2nd season)
- Home stadium: Romney Stadium

1952 Skyline Conference football standings
	Conf.					Overall
Team	W		L		T	W		L		T
Utah $	5	–	0	–	0	6	–	3	–	1
New Mexico	5	–	1	–	0	7	–	2	–	0
Colorado A&M	5	–	2	–	0	6	–	4	–	0
Wyoming	4	–	3	–	0	5	–	4	–	0
BYU	3	–	4	–	0	4	–	6	–	0
Utah State	3	–	4	–	0	3	–	7	–	1
Montana	1	–	5	–	0	2	–	7	–	1
Denver	0	–	7	–	0	3	–	7	–	0
$ – Conference champion

The 1952 Utah State Aggies football team was an American football team that represented Utah State University in the Skyline Conference during the 1952 college football season. In their second season under head coach John Roning, the Aggies compiled a 3–7–1 record (3–4 against Skyline opponents), tied for fifth place in the Skyline Conference, and were outscored by opponents by a total of 209 to 121.

== Schedule ==
Date	Opponent	Site	Result	Attendance	Source
September 20	at Montana	Dornblaser Field; Missoula, MT	W 7–0		
September 27	Pacific (CA)*	Romney Stadium; Logan, UT	L 7–34	10,000	
October 4	Wyoming	Romney Stadium; Logan, UT (rivalry)	L 0–14	7,000	
October 11	Idaho*	Romney Stadium; Logan, UT	L 3–6		
October 18	at Fresno State*	Ratcliffe Stadium; Fresno, CA	L 21–27	9,266–13,000	
October 25	Colorado A&M	Romney Stadium; Logan, UT	L 7–21	9,400	
November 1	at Wichita*	Veterans Stadium; Wichita, KS	T 20–20		
November 15	BYU	Romney Stadium; Logan, UT (rivalry)	W 27–26	5,800	
November 22	Denver	Romney Stadium; Logan, UT	W 29–13		
November 27	at Utah	Ute Stadium; Salt Lake City, UT (rivalry)	L 0–20	13,090	
December 6	at New Mexico	Zimmerman Field; Albuquerque, NM	L 0–28	10,000	
*Non-conference game
