= 1952 Texas Western Miners football team =

American college football season

1952 Texas Western Miners football
- Conference: Border Conference
- Record: 5–5–1 (2–3–1 Border)
- Head coach: Mike Brumbelow (3rd season)
- Home stadium: Kidd Field

1952 Border Conference football standings
	Conf.					Overall
Team	W		L		T	W		L		T
Arizona State $	4	–	0	–	0	6	–	3	–	0
Texas Tech	2	–	1	–	1	3	–	7	–	1
Arizona	3	–	2	–	0	6	–	4	–	0
Hardin–Simmons	2	–	2	–	1	5	–	3	–	2
Texas Western	2	–	3	–	1	5	–	5	–	1
New Mexico A&M	1	–	2	–	1	2	–	6	–	1
West Texas State	1	–	4	–	0	3	–	6	–	0
Arizona State–Flagstaff	0	–	1	–	0	3	–	4	–	0
$ – Conference champion

The 1952 Texas Western Miners football team was an American football team that represented Texas Western College (now known as University of Texas at El Paso) as a member of the Border Conference during the 1952 college football season. In its third season under head coach Mike Brumbelow, the team compiled a 5–5–1 record (2–3–1 against Border Conference opponents), finished fifth in the conference, and was outscored by a total of 235 to 228.

== Schedule ==
Date	Opponent	Site	Result	Attendance	Source
September 20	vs. North Texas State*	Broncho Stadium; Odessa, TX	L 14–27	3,500	
September 27	Sul Ross*	Kidd Field; El Paso, TX	W 42–0	12,000	
October 4	Hawaii*	Kidd Field; El Paso, TX	W 42–25	10,000	
October 11	at Texas Tech	Jones Stadium; Lubbock, TX	W 20–14	15,500	
October 18	at New Mexico A&M	Memorial Stadium; Las Cruces, NM (rivalry)	T 20–20		
October 25	New Mexico*	Kidd Field; El Paso, TX	L 13–14		
November 1	at Midwestern (TX)*	Coyote Stadium; Wichita Falls, TX	W 13–7	5,000	
November 8	Hardin–Simmons	Kidd Field; El Paso, TX	L 26–27	10,000	
November 15	Arizona^{†}	Kidd Field; El Paso, TX	L 7–55	10,500	
November 22	at Arizona State	Goodwin Stadium; Tempe, AZ	L 0–39	13,000	
November 27	West Texas State	Kidd Field; El Paso, TX	W 7–3	6,000	
*Non-conference game; ^{†}Homecoming
