= Murray Evans =

American football player and coach (1919–2004)

No. 23
- Position: Quarterback

Personal information
- Born: June 23, 1919; Goodlettsville, Tennessee, U.S.
- Died: March 10, 2004 (aged 84); Abilene, Texas, U.S.
- Listed height: 6 ft 1 in (1.85 m)
- Listed weight: 203 lb (92 kg)

Career information
- High school: Burkburnett (Burkburnett, Texas)
- College: Hardin-Simmons (1938–1941)
- NFL draft: 1942: 6th round, 45th overall pick

Career history

Playing
- Detroit Lions (1942–1943)

Coaching
- Hardin-Simmons (1947–1951) Assistant coach; Hardin-Simmons (1952–1954) Head coach

Career NFL statistics
- Passing yards: 72
- TD-INT: 0–3
- Passer rating: 6.4
- Stats at Pro Football Reference

Head coaching record
- Career: 15–14–2 (.516)

Murray Charles Evans (June 23, 1919 – March 10, 2004) was an American football player and coach. He served as the head football coach at Hardin–Simmons University from 1952 to 1954, compiling a record of 15–14–2.

Evans died on March 10, 2004, in Abilene, Texas.

== Head coaching record ==
=== College ===
Year	Team	Overall	Conference	Standing	Bowl/playoffs
Hardin–Simmons Cowboys (Border Conference) (1952–1954)
1952	Hardin–Simmons	5–3–2	2–2–1	4th	
1953	Hardin–Simmons	6–5	4–1	2nd	
1954	Hardin–Simmons	4–6	2–3	5th	
Hardin–Simmons:		15–14–2	8–6–1		
Total:		15–14–2			
