= 1952 New Mexico Lobos football team =

American college football season

1952 New Mexico Lobos football
- Conference: Skyline Conference
- Record: 7–2 (5–1 Skyline)
- Head coach: Dudley DeGroot (3rd season)
- Home stadium: Zimmerman Field

1952 Skyline Conference football standings
	Conf.					Overall
Team	W		L		T	W		L		T
Utah $	5	–	0	–	0	6	–	3	–	1
New Mexico	5	–	1	–	0	7	–	2	–	0
Colorado A&M	5	–	2	–	0	6	–	4	–	0
Wyoming	4	–	3	–	0	5	–	4	–	0
BYU	3	–	4	–	0	4	–	6	–	0
Utah State	3	–	4	–	0	3	–	7	–	1
Montana	1	–	5	–	0	2	–	7	–	1
Denver	0	–	7	–	0	3	–	7	–	0
$ – Conference champion

The 1952 New Mexico Lobos football team represented the University of New Mexico in the Skyline Conference during the 1952 college football season. In their third and final season under head coach Dudley DeGroot, the Lobos compiled a 7–2 record (5–1 against Skyline opponents), and outscored all opponents by a total of 119 to 46.

On defense, the team shut out five opponents and allowed an average of 5.1 points per game, ranking as "the least-scored-on major college team in the nation."

== Schedule ==
Date	Opponent	Site	Result	Attendance	Source
September 27	at BYU	Cougar Stadium; Provo, UT	L 10–14	8,500	
October 4	New Mexico A&M*	Zimmerman Field; Albuquerque, NM (rivalry)	W 23–0	8,500	
October 18	at Wyoming	War Memorial Stadium; Laramie, WY	W 7–0	5,992	
October 25	at Texas Western*	Kidd Field; El Paso, TX	W 14–13		
November 1	Arizona*^{†}	Zimmerman Field; Albuquerque, NM (rivalry)	L 7–13	12,000	
November 8	at Denver	Hilltop Stadium; Denver, CO	W 15–0	4,000	
November 15	Colorado A&M	Zimmerman Field; Albuquerque, NM	W 3–0		
November 22	Montana	Zimmerman Field; Albuquerque, NM	W 12–6	10,000	
December 6	Utah State	Zimmerman Field; Albuquerque, NM	W 28–0	10,000	
*Non-conference game; ^{†}Homecoming
