= 1953 Arizona State–Flagstaff Lumberjacks football team =

American college football season

1953 Arizona State–Flagstaff Lumberjacks football
- Conference: New Mexico Conference
- Record: 4–5 (3–3 NMC)
- Head coach: John Pederson (3rd season)
- Home stadium: Skidmore Field

1953 New Mexico Conference football standings
	Conf.					Overall
Team	W		L		T	W		L		T
Panhandle A&M $	6	–	0	–	0	8	–	1	–	1
New Mexico Military	4	–	2	–	0	4	–	3	–	0
Arizona State–Flagstaff	3	–	3	–	0	4	–	5	–	0
Eastern New Mexico	3	–	3	–	0	4	–	7	–	0
Adams State	3	–	3	–	0	3	–	6	–	0
New Mexico Western	2	–	4	–	0	3	–	5	–	0
New Mexico Highlands	0	–	6	–	0	0	–	8	–	0
$ – Conference champion

The 1953 Arizona State–Flagstaff Lumberjacks football team was an American football team that represented Arizona State College at Flagstaff (now known as Northern Arizona University) in the New Mexico Conference (NMC) during the 1953 college football season. In their third and final year under head coach John Pederson, the Lumberjacks compiled a 4–5 record and was outscored by a total of 166 to 126.

After the 1952 season, the Lumberjacks left the Border Conference and joined the NMC. In their first season in the NMC, they compiled a 3–3 record against conference opponents, finishing in a three-way tie for third place in the seven-team conference.

The team played its home games at Skidmore Field in Flagstaff, Arizona.

== Schedule ==
Date	Opponent	Site	Result	Attendance	Source
September 19	Adams State*	Skidmore Field; Flagstaff, AZ	W 20–7		
September 26	at Eastern New Mexico	Portales, NM	W 20–0		
October 3	at Whittier*	Whittier, CA	L 7–13		
October 10	Western State (CO)*	Skidmore Field; Flagstaff, AZ	L 7–26		
October 17	La Verne*^{†}	Skidmore Field; Flagstaff, AZ	W 18–14		
October 24	at New Mexico Highlands	Las Vegas, NM	W 12–8		
October 31	at Panhandle A&M	Goodwell, OK	L 21–26		
November 7	New Mexico Western	Skidmore Field; Flagstaff, AZ	W 20–7		
November 21	New Mexico Military	Skidmore Field; Flagstaff, AZ	L 21–45		
*Non-conference game; ^{†}Homecoming
