= 1952 Texas Tech Red Raiders football team =

American college football season

1952 Texas Tech Red Raiders football
- Conference: Border Conference
- Record: 3–7–1 (2–1–1 Border)
- Head coach: DeWitt Weaver (2nd season)
- Offensive scheme: T formation
- Base defense: 5–3
- Home stadium: Jones Stadium

1952 Border Conference football standings
	Conf.					Overall
Team	W		L		T	W		L		T
Arizona State $	4	–	0	–	0	6	–	3	–	0
Texas Tech	2	–	1	–	1	3	–	7	–	1
Arizona	3	–	2	–	0	6	–	4	–	0
Hardin–Simmons	2	–	2	–	1	5	–	3	–	2
Texas Western	2	–	3	–	1	5	–	5	–	1
New Mexico A&M	1	–	2	–	1	2	–	6	–	1
West Texas State	1	–	4	–	0	3	–	6	–	0
Arizona State–Flagstaff	0	–	1	–	0	3	–	4	–	0
$ – Conference champion

The 1952 Texas Tech Red Raiders football team represented Texas Technological College—now known as Texas Tech University—as a member of the Border Conference during the 1952 college football season. Led by second-year head coach DeWitt Weaver, the Red Raiders compiled an overall record of 3–7–1 with a mark of 2–1–1 in conference play, placing second in the Border Conference.

== Schedule ==
Date	Time	Opponent	Site	Result	Attendance	Source
September 20	8:00 p.m.	West Texas State	Jones Stadium; Lubbock, TX	W 48–7	15,500	
September 27		at Rice*	Rice Stadium; Houston, TX	L 7–34	37,000	
October 4		at Pacific (CA)*	Pacific Memorial Stadium; Stockton, CA	L 21–42	15,700	
October 11		Texas Western	Jones Stadium; Lubbock, TX	L 14–20	15,500	
October 18		Baylor*	Jones Stadium; Lubbock, TX (rivalry)	L 10–21	15,500–20,000	
November 1		Houston*^{†}	Jones Stadium; Lubbock, TX (rivalry)	L 7–20	17,000–20,000	
November 8		at North Texas State*	Eagle Stadium; Denton, TX	L 19–34	13,000	
November 15	2:00 p.m.	at Hardin–Simmons	Fair Park Stadium; Abilene, TX	T 14–14	7,500–9,500	
November 22		at Arizona	Arizona Stadium; Tucson, AZ	W 19–14	19,000	
November 29	2:00 p.m.	No. 11 Tulsa*	Jones Stadium; Lubbock, TX	L 20–26	10,100–15,500	
December 6		NC State*	Jones Stadium; Lubbock, TX	W 54–7	10,000–11,000	
*Non-conference game; ^{†}Homecoming; Rankings from AP Poll released prior to the game; All times are in Central time
