= 1952 Colorado A&M Aggies football team =

American college football season

1952 Colorado A&M Aggies football
- Conference: Skyline Conference
- Record: 6–4 (4–2 Skyline)
- Head coach: Bob Davis (6th season)
- Home stadium: Colorado Field

1952 Skyline Conference football standings
	Conf.					Overall
Team	W		L		T	W		L		T
Utah $	5	–	0	–	0	6	–	3	–	1
New Mexico	5	–	1	–	0	7	–	2	–	0
Colorado A&M	5	–	2	–	0	6	–	4	–	0
Wyoming	4	–	3	–	0	5	–	4	–	0
BYU	3	–	4	–	0	4	–	6	–	0
Utah State	3	–	4	–	0	3	–	7	–	1
Montana	1	–	5	–	0	2	–	7	–	1
Denver	0	–	7	–	0	3	–	7	–	0
$ – Conference champion

The 1952 Colorado A&M Aggies football team represented Colorado State College of Agriculture and Mechanic Arts in the Skyline Conference during the 1952 college football season. In their sixth season under head coach Bob Davis, the Aggies compiled a 6–4 record (4–2 against Skyline opponents), finished third in the Skyline Conference, and outscored all opponents by a total of 177 to 137.

== Schedule ==
Date	Opponent	Site	Result	Attendance	Source
September 20	at Colorado Mines*	Alumni Field; Golden, CO	W 26–0		
September 27	at Arizona State*	Goodwin Stadium; Tempe, AZ	L 14–40		
October 4	at Denver	Hilltop Stadium; Denver, CO	W 28–6		
October 11	at Wyoming	War Memorial Stadium; Laramie, WY (rivalry)	W 14–0	15,982	
October 18	Montana	Colorado Field; Fort Collins, CO	W 41–0	12,000	
October 25	at Utah State	Romney Stadium; Logan, UT	W 21–7	9,400	
November 8	Utah^{†}	Colorado Field; Fort Collins, CO	L 6–14	12,500	
November 15	at New Mexico	Zimmerman Field; Albuquerque, NM	L 0–3		
November 22	BYU	Colorado Field; Fort Collins, CO	W 27–6		
November 29	at Colorado*	Folsom Field; Boulder, CO (rivalry)	L 0–61	12,393	
*Non-conference game; ^{†}Homecoming
