= 1952 BYU Cougars football team =

American college football season

1952 BYU Cougars football
- Conference: Skyline Conference
- Record: 4–6 (3–4 Skyline Six)
- Head coach: Chick Atkinson (4th season)
- Home stadium: Cougar Stadium

1952 Skyline Conference football standings
	Conf.					Overall
Team	W		L		T	W		L		T
Utah $	5	–	0	–	0	6	–	3	–	1
New Mexico	5	–	1	–	0	7	–	2	–	0
Colorado A&M	5	–	2	–	0	6	–	4	–	0
Wyoming	4	–	3	–	0	5	–	4	–	0
BYU	3	–	4	–	0	4	–	6	–	0
Utah State	3	–	4	–	0	3	–	7	–	1
Montana	1	–	5	–	0	2	–	7	–	1
Denver	0	–	7	–	0	3	–	7	–	0
$ – Conference champion

The 1952 BYU Cougars football team was an American football team that represented Brigham Young University (BYU) as a member of the Skyline Conference during the 1952 college football season. In their fourth season under head coach Chick Atkinson, the Cougars compiled an overall record of 4–6 with a mark of 3–4 against conference opponents, finished fifth in the Skyline, and were outscored by a total of 240 to 154.

The team's statistical leaders included Reed Stolworthy with 436 rushing yards and Dick Felt with 42 points scored. Felt set a BYU record that still stands with four touchdowns in the fourth quarter against San Jose State on November 7, 1952.

== Schedule ==
Date	Opponent	Site	Result	Attendance	Source
September 19	San Diego NAS*	Cougar Stadium; Provo, UT	W 14–7		
September 27	New Mexico	Cougar Stadium; Provo, UT	W 14–10	8,500	
October 4	at Montana	Dornblaser Field; Missoula, MT	W 28–7		
October 11	at Utah	Ute Stadium; Salt Lake City, UT	L 6–34		
October 25	Denver	Cougar Stadium; Provo, UT	W 14–13	9,431	
November 1	Wyoming	Cougar Stadium; Provo, UT	L 13–24	7,000	
November 7	at San Jose State*	Spartan Stadium; San Jose, CA	L 27–44	10,000	
November 15	at Utah State	Romney Stadium; Logan, UT (rivalry)	L 26–27	5,800	
November 22	at Colorado A&M	Colorado Field; Fort Collins, CO	L 6–27		
November 29	at Arizona State*	Goodwin Stadium; Tempe, AZ	L 6–47	12,000	
*Non-conference game
