= 1952 North Texas State Eagles football team =

American college football season

1952 North Texas State Eagles football

GCC champion
- Conference: Gulf Coast Conference
- Record: 7–3 (2–0 GCC)
- Head coach: Odus Mitchell (7th season)
- Home stadium: Eagle Stadium

1952 Gulf Coast Conference football standings
	Conf.					Overall
Team	W		L		T	W		L		T
North Texas State $	2	–	0	–	0	7	–	3	–	0
Midwestern (TX)	1	–	1	–	0	6	–	5	–	0
Trinity (TX)	0	–	2	–	0	4	–	6	–	0
$ – Conference champion

The 1952 North Texas State Eagles football team was an American football team that represented North Texas State College (now known as the University of North Texas) during the 1952 college football season as a member of the Gulf Coast Conference. In their seventh year under head coach Odus Mitchell, the team compiled a 7–3 record. It was the program's first season at the new Eagle Stadium, which would later be renamed Fouts Field.

== Schedule ==
Date	Opponent	Site	Result	Attendance	Source
September 20	vs. Texas Western*	Broncho Stadium; Odessa, TX	W 27–14	3,500	
September 27	North Dakota*	Eagle Stadium; Denton, TX	W 55–0	13,000	
October 4	at Dayton*	University of Dayton Stadium; Dayton, OH	L 14–20	6,300	
October 11	at Mississippi State*	Scott Field; Starkville, MS	L 0–14	12,000	
October 18	Hardin–Simmons*	Eagle Stadium; Denton, TX	L 13–28	7,500	
October 25	at Memphis State*	Crump Stadium; Memphis, TN	W 38–14	3,600	
November 1	Trinity (TX)	Eagle Stadium; Denton, TX	W 34–7		
November 8	Texas Tech*^{†}	Eagle Stadium; Denton, TX	W 34–19	13,000	
November 15	Carswell Air Force Base*	Eagle Stadium; Denton, TX	W 28–14		
November 27	at Midwestern (TX)	Wichita Falls, TX	W 33–7		
*Non-conference game; ^{†}Homecoming
