= 1952 Hardin–Simmons Cowboys football team =

American college football season

1952 Hardin–Simmons Cowboys football
- Conference: Border Conference
- Record: 5–3–2 (2–2–1 Border)
- Head coach: Murray Evans (1st season)
- Home stadium: Parramore Field, Fair Park Stadium

1952 Border Conference football standings
	Conf.					Overall
Team	W		L		T	W		L		T
Arizona State $	4	–	0	–	0	6	–	3	–	0
Texas Tech	2	–	1	–	1	3	–	7	–	1
Arizona	3	–	2	–	0	6	–	4	–	0
Hardin–Simmons	2	–	2	–	1	5	–	3	–	2
Texas Western	2	–	3	–	1	5	–	5	–	1
New Mexico A&M	1	–	2	–	1	2	–	6	–	1
West Texas State	1	–	4	–	0	3	–	6	–	0
Arizona State–Flagstaff	0	–	1	–	0	3	–	4	–	0
$ – Conference champion

The 1952 Hardin–Simmons Cowboys football team was an American football team that represented Hardin–Simmons University in the Border Conference during the 1952 college football season. In its first season under head coach Murray Evans, the team compiled a 5–3–2 record (2–2–1 against conference opponents), finished in fourth place in the conference, and outscored opponents by a total of 221 to 189.

Six Hardin-Simmons players were named to the 1952 All-Border Conference football team: end D.C. Andrews; center Roy Carter; guard Bill Golman; fullback Mitchel Malouf; guard Bill Murry; and Maurice Waguespack.

== Schedule ==
Date	Time	Opponent	Site	Result	Attendance	Source
September 20	8:00 p.m.	Arizona State	Parramore Field; Abilene, TX	L 7–26		
September 27	8:00 p.m.	at Tulsa*	Skelly Field; Tulsa, OK	L 27–56	15,500	
October 4		Trinity (TX)*	Parramore Field; Abilene, TX	W 33–7		
October 11	8:00 p.m.	at Midwestern (TX)*	Coyote Stadium; Wichita Falls, TX	W 34–14	7,000	
October 18		at North Texas State*	Eagle Stadium; Denton, TX	W 28–13	7,500	
October 25		at Arizona	Arizona Stadium; Tucson, AZ	L 12–13	22,000	
November 1		at Santa Clara*	Grape Bowl; Lodi, CA	T 14–14	3,500	
November 8		at Texas Western	Kidd Field; El Paso, TX	W 27–26	10,000	
November 15	2:00 p.m.	Texas Tech	Fair Park Stadium; Abilene, TX	T 14–14	7,500–9,500	
November 22	2:00 p.m.	West Texas State	Parramore Field; Abilene, TX	W 25–6		
*Non-conference game; All times are in Central time
