= 1952 San Jose State Spartans football team =

American college football season

1952 San Jose State Spartans football
- Conference: Independent
- Record: 6–3
- Head coach: Bob Bronzan (3rd season)
- Home stadium: Spartan Stadium

1952 Western college football independents records
	Conf.			Overall
Team	W	L	T	W		L		T
Fresno State		–		8	–	2	–	0
Pacific (CA)		–		7	–	3	–	1
San Jose State		–		6	–	3	–	0
La Verne		–		5	–	3	–	1
Hawaii		–		5	–	5	–	2
Cal Poly San Dimas		–		4	–	4	–	0
Nevada		–		2	–	2	–	0
Santa Clara		–		2	–	6	–	1

The 1952 San Jose State Spartans football team represented San Jose State College—now known as San Jose State University—as an independent during the 1952 college football season. Led by third-year head coach Bob Bronzan, the Spartans compiled a record of 6–3 and outscored opponents 251 to 164. The team played home games at Spartan Stadium in San Jose, California.

== Schedule ==
Date	Opponent	Site	Result	Attendance	Source
September 20	at Colorado	Folsom Field; Boulder, CO	L 14–20	19,998	
September 27	at San Diego State	Aztec Bowl; San Diego, CA	W 47–6	8,500	
October 4	at Arizona State	Goodwin Stadium; Tempe, AZ	W 21–14		
October 10	Fresno State	Spartan Stadium; San Jose, CA (rivalry)	W 40–6	12,000	
October 18	at Pacific (CA)	Pacific Memorial Stadium; Stockton, CA (Victory Bell)	W 26–21	29,159	
November 1	at Stanford	Stanford Stadium; Stanford, CA (rivalry)	L 13–35		
November 7	BYU	Spartan Stadium; San Jose, CA	W 44–27	10,000	
November 14	Montana	Spartan Stadium; San Jose, CA	W 39–20	5,000	
November 27	Santa Clara	Spartan Stadium; San Jose, CA	L 7–15	12,924	

== Team players in the NFL ==
The following San Jose State players were selected in the 1953 NFL draft.

Player	Position	Round	Overall	NFL team
Jim Psaltis	Defensive back	2	15	Chicago Cardinals
George Porter	Tackle	12	142	Philadelphia Eagles
Stan Wacholz	End	18	212	San Francisco 49ers
Paul Held	Quarterback	19	229	Detroit Lions
