= 1952 Santa Clara Broncos football team =

American college football season

1952 Santa Clara Broncos football
- Conference: Independent
- Record: 2–6–1
- Head coach: Richard F. Gallagher (3rd season)
- Home stadium: Kezar Stadium

1952 Western college football independents records
	Conf.			Overall
Team	W	L	T	W		L		T
Fresno State		–		8	–	2	–	0
Pacific (CA)		–		7	–	3	–	1
San Jose State		–		6	–	3	–	0
La Verne		–		5	–	3	–	1
Hawaii		–		5	–	5	–	2
Cal Poly San Dimas		–		4	–	4	–	0
Nevada		–		2	–	2	–	0
Santa Clara		–		2	–	6	–	1

The 1952 Santa Clara Broncos football team was an American football team that represented the University of Santa Clara as an independent during the 1952 college football season. In their third season under head coach Richard F. Gallagher, the independent Broncos compiled a 2–6–1 record and were outscored 182 to 80. Their three home games were played off campus in San Francisco, Lodi, and Sacramento.

A month after the season ended, Rev. Herman J. Hauck, president of the university, announced on December 29 that the football program was being dropped. The state's other major college football programs at Catholic institutions, all NCAA independents, had recently been halted: Saint Mary's after the 1950 season and San Francisco and Loyola after 1951. Father Hauck stated that the football program had lost substantial money in the previous two seasons; other sources put the losses at $80,000 in 1952 and $72,000 in 1951.

By early 1954, there was already support for reviving the program, which returned for the 1959 season.

== Schedule ==
Date	Opponent	Rank	Site	Result	Attendance	Source
September 20	at No. 13 Stanford		Stanford Stadium; Stanford, CA	L 13–28	27,500	
September 27	at No. 17 Kansas		Memorial Stadium; Lawrence, KS	L 9–21	25,579	
October 4	at Tulane		Tulane Stadium; New Orleans, LA	L 0–35		
October 18	at No. 3 California		California Memorial Stadium; Berkeley, CA	L 7–27	33,000	
October 24	Idaho		Kezar Stadium; San Francisco, CA	W 9–7	5,000	
November 1	Hardin–Simmons		Grape Bowl; Lodi, CA	T 14–14	3,500	
November 8	at Pacific (CA)		Pacific Memorial Stadium; Stockton, CA	L 0–27	15,280	
November 15	Utah		Hughes Memorial Stadium; Sacramento, CA	L 13–16	5,253	
November 27	at San Jose State		Spartan Stadium; San Jose, CA	W 15–7	12,924	
Rankings from AP Poll released prior to the game
