= 1952 Nevada Wolf Pack football team =

American college football season

1952 Nevada Wolf Pack football
- Conference: Independent
- Record: 2–2
- Head coach: Jake Lawlor (1st season)
- Captains: Neil Garrett; Ray Gonsalves
- Home stadium: Mackay Stadium

1952 Western college football independents records
	Conf.			Overall
Team	W	L	T	W		L		T
Fresno State		–		8	–	2	–	0
Pacific (CA)		–		7	–	3	–	1
San Jose State		–		6	–	3	–	0
La Verne		–		5	–	3	–	1
Hawaii		–		5	–	5	–	2
Cal Poly San Dimas		–		4	–	4	–	0
Nevada		–		2	–	2	–	0
Santa Clara		–		2	–	6	–	1

The 1952 Nevada Wolf Pack football team represented the University of Nevada as an independent during the 1952 college football season. Led by first-year head coach Jake Lawlor, the Wolf Pack compiled a record of 2–2, scoring 105 points and allowing 107 in an abbreviated four-game schedule. Neil Garrett and Ray Gonsalves served as team co-captains. Senior end Mert Baxter led the team in scoring with 25 points. Nevada did not field a team in 1951.

== Schedule ==
Date	Opponent	Site	Result	Attendance	Source
October 4	Cal Aggies	Mackay Stadium; Reno, NV	W 26–13		
October 11	at Chico State	Chico High School Stadium; Chico, CA	W 34–2		
October 25	at Idaho State	Spud Bowl; Pocatello, ID	L 13–33	3,000	
November 8	Fresno State^{†}	Mackay Stadium; Reno, NV	L 32–59		
^{†}Homecoming
