= 1952 Arizona Wildcats football team =

American college football season

1952 Arizona Wildcats football
- Conference: Border Conference
- Record: 6–4 (3–2 Border)
- Head coach: Warren Woodson (1st season)
- Captains: Jim Donarski; Dick Christiansen
- Home stadium: Arizona Stadium

1952 Border Conference football standings
	Conf.					Overall
Team	W		L		T	W		L		T
Arizona State $	4	–	0	–	0	6	–	3	–	0
Texas Tech	2	–	1	–	1	3	–	7	–	1
Arizona	3	–	2	–	0	6	–	4	–	0
Hardin–Simmons	2	–	2	–	1	5	–	3	–	2
Texas Western	2	–	3	–	1	5	–	5	–	1
New Mexico A&M	1	–	2	–	1	2	–	6	–	1
West Texas State	1	–	4	–	0	3	–	6	–	0
Arizona State–Flagstaff	0	–	1	–	0	3	–	4	–	0
$ – Conference champion

The 1952 Arizona Wildcats football team represented the University of Arizona in the Border Conference during the 1952 college football season. In their first season under head coach Warren B. Woodson, the Wildcats compiled a 6–4 record (3–2 against Border opponents) and outscored their opponents, 285 to 155. The team captains were Jim Donarski and Dick Christiansen. The team played its home games in Arizona Stadium in Tucson, Arizona.

== Schedule ==
Date	Opponent	Site	Result	Attendance	Source
September 20	Hawaii*	Arizona Stadium; Tucson, AZ	W 57–7	18,000	
September 27	New Mexico A&M	Arizona Stadium; Tucson, AZ	W 62–12	17,500	
October 4	at Utah*	Ute Stadium; Salt Lake City, UT	W 27–0		
October 11	Colorado*	Arizona Stadium; Tucson, AZ	L 19–34	24,500	
October 18	at Marquette*	Marquette Stadium; Milwaukee, WI	L 7–37	13,000	
October 25	Hardin–Simmons	Arizona Stadium; Tucson, AZ	W 13–12	22,000	
November 1	at New Mexico*	Zimmerman Field; Albuquerque, NM (rivalry)	W 13–7	12,000	
November 8	Arizona State	Arizona Stadium; Tucson, AZ (rivalry)	L 18–20	27,000	
November 15	at Texas Western	Kidd Field; El Paso, TX	W 55–7	10,500	
November 22	Texas Tech	Arizona Stadium; Tucson, AZ	L 14–19	19,000	
*Non-conference game
