= 1952 Arizona State–Flagstaff Lumberjacks football team =

American college football season

1952 Arizona State–Flagstaff Lumberjacks football
- Conference: Border Conference
- Record: 2–4 (0–1 Border)
- Head coach: John Pederson (2nd season)
- Home stadium: Skidmore Field

1952 Border Conference football standings
	Conf.					Overall
Team	W		L		T	W		L		T
Arizona State $	4	–	0	–	0	6	–	3	–	0
Texas Tech	2	–	1	–	1	3	–	7	–	1
Arizona	3	–	2	–	0	6	–	4	–	0
Hardin–Simmons	2	–	2	–	1	5	–	3	–	2
Texas Western	2	–	3	–	1	5	–	5	–	1
New Mexico A&M	1	–	2	–	1	2	–	6	–	1
West Texas State	1	–	4	–	0	3	–	6	–	0
Arizona State–Flagstaff	0	–	1	–	0	3	–	4	–	0
$ – Conference champion

The 1952 Arizona State–Flagstaff Lumberjacks football team was an American football team that represented Arizona State College at Flagstaff (now known as Northern Arizona University) in the Border Conference during the 1952 college football season. In its second year under head coach John Pederson, the team compiled a 2–4 record (0–1 against conference opponents), was outscored by a total of 121 to 92, and finished last of eight teams in the Border Conference. The team also played New Mexico Highlands and led, 13–7, but the game was declared "no contest" after played was halted when the field lights failed.

The team played its home games at Skidmore Field in Flagstaff, Arizona. Key players included quarterback Howard Miller, a transfer from Orange Coast Junior College, fullback Jim Bryan, halfbacks Branch Gill and Bill Hannah, tackle Marvin Hardis, and ends Frank Cottrell and Frank Gomez.

== Schedule ==
Date	Opponent	Site	Result	Attendance	Source
September 27	Eastern New Mexico*	Skidmore Field; Flagstaff, AZ	L 7–21		
October 11	La Verne*^{†}	Skidmore Field; Flagstaff, AZ	W 36–14		
October 18	Caltech*	Skidmore Field; Flagstaff, AZ	W 20–7		
October 18	New Mexico Highlands*	Skidmore Field; Flagstaff, AZ	13–7 (no contest)		
November 1	New Mexico A&M	Skidmore Field; Flagstaff, AZ	L 9–33		
November 8	at New Mexico Western*	Silver City, NM	L 7–14		
November 15	at Whittier*	Whittier, CA	L 0–25		
*Non-conference game; ^{†}Homecoming
