= 1952 Stanford Indians football team =

American college football season

1952 Stanford Indians football
- Conference: Pacific Coast Conference
- Record: 5–5 (2–5 PCC)
- Head coach: Chuck Taylor (2nd season)
- Home stadium: Stanford Stadium

1952 Pacific Coast Conference football standings
	Conf.					Overall
Team	W		L		T	W		L		T
No. 5 USC $	6	–	0	–	0	10	–	1	–	0
No. 6 UCLA	5	–	1	–	0	8	–	1	–	0
Washington	6	–	2	–	0	7	–	3	–	0
California	3	–	3	–	0	7	–	3	–	0
Washington State	3	–	4	–	0	4	–	6	–	0
Stanford	2	–	5	–	0	5	–	5	–	0
Oregon	2	–	5	–	0	2	–	7	–	1
Idaho	1	–	3	–	0	4	–	4	–	1
Oregon State	1	–	6	–	0	2	–	7	–	0
$ – Conference champion; Rankings from AP Poll

The 1952 Stanford Indians football team represented Stanford University in the 1952 college football season. The team was led by head coach Chuck Taylor in his second year and played their home games at Stanford Stadium in Stanford, California.

After winning the conference and making it to the Rose Bowl in the previous season, the team was ranked No. 13 in preseason polls. After winning their first four games, the team lost five of the last six games, including a 26–0 Big Game shutout—its worst loss to rival California in more than half a century—to finish well out of the conference championship.

Running back Bob Mathias, who had won his second gold medal in the decathlon earlier in the summer at the 1952 Summer Olympics, was Stanford's only 1953 NFL draft selection.

== Schedule ==
Date	Opponent	Rank	Site	Result	Attendance	Source
September 20	Santa Clara*	No. 13	Stanford Stadium; Stanford, CA	W 28–13	27,500	
September 27	at No. 15 Washington State	No. 13	Rogers Field; Pullman, WA	W 14–13	25,000	
October 4	Michigan*		Stanford Stadium; Stanford, CA	W 14–7	45,000	
October 11	Oregon State		Stanford Stadium; Stanford, CA	W 41–28	28,000	
October 18	at No. 10 UCLA	No. 13	Los Angeles Memorial Coliseum; Los Angeles, CA	L 14–24	80,617	
October 25	Washington		Stanford Stadium; Stanford, CA	L 14–27	25,000	
November 1	San Jose State*		Stanford Stadium; Stanford, CA (rivalry)	W 35–13	20,000	
November 8	No. 6 USC		Stanford Stadium; Stanford, CA (rivalry)	L 7–54	45,000	
November 15	Oregon		Stanford Stadium; Stanford, CA	L 20–21	6,100	
November 22	at California		California Memorial Stadium; Berkeley, CA (Big Game)	L 0–26	83,000	
*Non-conference game; Rankings from AP Poll released prior to the game; Source:

== Players drafted by the NFL ==
Player	Position	Round	Pick	NFL club
Bob Mathias	Back	30	352	Washington Redskins
