= 1952 Chico State Wildcats football team =

American college football season

1952 Chico State Wildcats football
- Conference: Far Western Conference
- Record: 1–6 (1–3 FWC)
- Head coach: Ernie Busch (1st season)
- Home stadium: Chico High School Stadium

1952 Far Western Conference football standings
	Conf.					Overall
Team	W		L		T	W		L		T
Humboldt State $	3	–	0	–	0	7	–	1	–	0
Cal Aggies	2	–	1	–	0	2	–	7	–	0
San Francisco State	1	–	0	–	0	3	–	6	–	0
Chico State	1	–	3	–	0	1	–	6	–	0
Southern Oregon	0	–	3	–	0	3	–	5	–	0
$ – Conference champion

The 1952 Chico State Wildcats football team represented Chico State College—now known as California State University, Chico—as a member of the Far Western Conference (FWC) during the 1952 college football season. Led by first-year head coach Ernie Busch, Chico State compiled an overall record of 1–6 with a mark of 1–3 in conference play, placing fourth in the FWC. The team was outscored by its opponents 201 to 85 for the season. The Wildcats played home games at Chico High School Stadium in Chico, California.

== Schedule ==
Date	Opponent	Site	Result	Source
September 27	Willamette*	Chico High School Stadium; Chico, CA	L 0–53	
October 4	at Humboldt State	Redwood Bowl; Arcata, CA	L 6–41	
October 11	Nevada*	Chico High School Stadium; Chico, CA	L 2–34	
October 18	Southern Oregon	Chico High School Stadium; Chico, CA	W 33–0	
October 25	Presidio of San Francisco (Note: The Presidio of San Francisco was an Army fort from 1848 to 1996. For many years they fielded a team that played against colleges and other military teams.)*	Chico High School Stadium; Chico, CA	L 6–14	
November 1	at San Francisco State	Cox Stadium; San Francisco, CA	L 19–39	
November 15	Cal Aggies	Chico High School Stadium; Chico, CA	L 19–20	
*Non-conference game
