= 1952 Wyoming Cowboys football team =

American college football season

1952 Wyoming Cowboys football
- Conference: Skyline Conference
- Record: 5–4 (4–3 Skyline)
- Head coach: Bowden Wyatt (6th season)
- Captain: Harry Geldein
- Home stadium: War Memorial Stadium

1952 Skyline Conference football standings
	Conf.					Overall
Team	W		L		T	W		L		T
Utah $	5	–	0	–	0	6	–	3	–	1
New Mexico	5	–	1	–	0	7	–	2	–	0
Colorado A&M	5	–	2	–	0	6	–	4	–	0
Wyoming	4	–	3	–	0	5	–	4	–	0
BYU	3	–	4	–	0	4	–	6	–	0
Utah State	3	–	4	–	0	3	–	7	–	1
Montana	1	–	5	–	0	2	–	7	–	1
Denver	0	–	7	–	0	3	–	7	–	0
$ – Conference champion

The 1952 Wyoming Cowboys football team was an American football team that represented the University of Wyoming as a member of the Skyline Conference during the 1952 college football season. In their sixth and final season under head coach Bowden Wyatt, the Cowboys compiled a 5–4 record (4–3 against Skyline opponents), finished fourth in the conference, and outscored opponents by a total of 114 to 102.

In January 1953, Bowden Wyatt resigned as Wyoming's head football coach to accept the same post at the University of Arkansas. In six years at Wyoming, Wyatt compiled a 39–17–1 record. He was posthumously inducted into the College Football Hall of Fame as a coach in 1997.

== Schedule ==
Date	Opponent	Site	Result	Attendance	Source
September 27	Montana	War Memorial Stadium; Laramie, WY	W 14–0	10,676	
October 4	at Utah State	Aggie Stadium; Logan, UT (rivalry)	W 14–0	7,000	
October 11	Colorado A&M	War Memorial Stadium; Laramie, WY (rivalry)	L 0–14	15,982	
October 18	New Mexico	War Memorial Stadium; Laramie, WY	L 0–7	5,992	
October 25	Utah^{†}	War Memorial Stadium; Laramie, WY	L 21–27	11,073	
November 1	at BYU	Cougar Stadium; Provo, UT	W 24–13	7,000	
November 8	at Kansas State*	Memorial Stadium; Manhattan, KS	W 20–7	8,000	
November 27	at Denver	DU Stadium; Denver, CO	W 21–14		
December 6	at Houston*	Rice Stadium; Houston, TX	L 0–20	23,000	
*Non-conference game; ^{†}Homecoming
