= 1952 West Texas State Buffaloes football team =

American college football season

1952 West Texas State Buffaloes football
- Conference: Border Conference
- Record: 3–6 (1–4 Border)
- Head coach: Frank Kimbrough (6th season)
- Home stadium: Buffalo Stadium

1952 Border Conference football standings
	Conf.					Overall
Team	W		L		T	W		L		T
Arizona State $	4	–	0	–	0	6	–	3	–	0
Texas Tech	2	–	1	–	1	3	–	7	–	1
Arizona	3	–	2	–	0	6	–	4	–	0
Hardin–Simmons	2	–	2	–	1	5	–	3	–	2
Texas Western	2	–	3	–	1	5	–	5	–	1
New Mexico A&M	1	–	2	–	1	2	–	6	–	1
West Texas State	1	–	4	–	0	3	–	6	–	0
Arizona State–Flagstaff	0	–	1	–	0	3	–	4	–	0
$ – Conference champion

The 1952 West Texas State Buffaloes football team represented West Texas State College—now known as West Texas A&M University—as a member of the Border Conference during the 1952 college football season. Led by sixth-year head coach Frank Kimbrough, the Buffaloes compiled an overall record of 3–6 with a mark of 1–4 in conference play, placing seventh the Border Conference.

== Schedule ==
Date	Time	Opponent	Site	Result	Attendance	Source
September 20	8:00 p.m.	at Texas Tech	Jones Stadium; Lubbock, TX	L 7–48	15,500	
September 27		vs. McMurry*	Amarillo Stadium; Amarillo, TX	W 19–6	6,000	
October 11		New Mexico A&M^{†}	Buffalo Stadium; Canyon, TX	W 45–7		
October 18	9:00 p.m.	at Arizona State	Goodwin Stadium; Tempe, AZ	L 14–48	13,000	
October 25		Abilene Christian*	Buffalo Stadium; Canyon, TX	W 20–18	4,000	
November 8		Midwestern (TX)*	Buffalo Stadium; Canyon, TX	L 13–21	1,200	
November 15		at Trinity (TX)*	San Antonio, TX	L 6–39		
November 22	2:00 p.m.	at Hardin–Simmons	Parramore Field; Abilene, TX	L 6–25		
November 27		at Texas Western	Kidd Field; El Paso, TX	L 7–31	6,000	
*Non-conference game; ^{†}Homecoming; All times are in Central time
