= 1952 Los Angeles State Diablos football team =

American college football season

1952 Los Angeles State Diablos football
- Conference: California Collegiate Athletic Association
- Record: 4–4 (1–3 CCAA)
- Head coach: Leonard Adams (2nd season)
- Home stadium: Los Angeles State Field

1952 California Collegiate Athletic Association football standings
	Conf.					Overall
Team	W		L		T	W		L		T
Cal Poly $	4	–	0	–	0	7	–	3	–	0
Santa Barbara	3	–	1	–	0	8	–	2	–	0
San Diego State	2	–	2	–	0	4	–	5	–	0
Los Angeles State	1	–	3	–	0	4	–	4	–	0
Pepperdine	0	–	4	–	0	2	–	7	–	0
$ – Conference champion

The 1952 Los Angeles State Diablos football team represented Los Angeles State College—now known as California State University, Los Angeles—as a member of the California Collegiate Athletic Association (CCAA) during the 1952 college football season. Led by second-year head coach Leonard Adams, Los Angeles State compiled an overall record of 4–4 with a mark of 1–3 in conference play, placing fourth in the CCAA. The Diablos played home games at Los Angeles State Field in Los Angeles.

== Schedule ==
Date	Time	Opponent	Site	Result	Attendance	Source
October 3	8:00 pm	Point Mugu Navy (Note: Naval Air Station Point Mugu was a Naval air station located in Ventura County, California from 1942 to 2000)*	Los Angeles State Field; Los Angeles, CA	W 27–0		
October 11		at Redlands*	Redlands Stadium (Note: This stadium is the predecessor to the current Ted Runner Stadium on the University of Redlands campus, which was opened for the 1968 season); Redlands, CA	L 6–20		
October 17		Santa Barbara	Los Angeles State Field; Los Angeles, CA	L 20–21		
October 25	8:00 pm	at San Diego State	Aztec Bowl; San Diego, CA	L 26–41	5,000	
October 31	8:00 pm	Pomona*	Los Angeles State Field; Los Angeles, CA	W 35–19		
November 8	8:00 pm	at Cal Poly	Mustang Stadium; San Luis Obispo, CA	L 7–32		
November 14		La Verne*	Los Angeles State Field; Los Angeles, CA	W 12–7		
November 21	8:00 pm	at Pepperdine	El Camino Stadium; Torrance, CA ("Old Shoe" rivalry)	W 13–0	3,500	
*Non-conference game
