= Joseph T. Coleman =

American football player and coach (1912–1979)

Joe T. Coleman
Biographical details
- Born: November 5, 1912; Tyler, Texas, U.S.
- Died: September 4, 1979 (aged 66); Odessa, Texas, U.S.

Playing career
- 1934: TCU
- Position: Quarterback

Coaching career (HC unless noted)
- 1938–1941: Odessa HS (TX)
- 1946–1950: Odessa HS (TX)
- 1951–1952: New Mexico A&M

Head coaching record
- Overall: 3–15–1 (college)

Joseph T. Coleman (November 5, 1912 – September 5, 1979) was an American football player and coach.

He played college football, basketball, and baseball at Texas Christian University (TCU) and was captain and quarterback of the 1934 team.

He was a high school coach in Odessa, Texas, from 1938 to 1941 and 1946 to 1950, where he coached future Iowa Hawkeyes football coaching legend Hayden Fry. His 1946 team was undefeated and won the Texas state championship and compiled a 77–18–3 record at Odessa. He served in the United States Navy during World War II.

In April 1951, he was hired as the head football coach at New Mexico A&M. He compiled a 3–15–1 record in two seasons at New Mexico A&M. After leaving New Mexico A&M,

Coleman returned to Odessa where he was a partner in an athletic supply company. He was inducted into the Texas High School Coaches Association's Hall of Honor in 1971. He died in 1979 in Odessa of an apparent heart attack.

== Head coaching record ==
=== College ===
Year	Team	Overall	Conference	Standing	Bowl/playoffs
New Mexico A&M Aggies (Border Conference) (1951–1952)
1951	New Mexico A&M	1–9	1–4	6th	
1952	New Mexico A&M	2–6–1	1–2–1	6th	
New Mexico A&M:		3–15–1	2–6–1		
Total:		3–15–1			
