= 1952 Oregon State Beavers football team =

American college football season

1952 Oregon State Beavers football
- Head coach Kip Taylor
- Conference: Pacific Coast Conference
- Record: 2–7 (1–6 PCC)
- Head coach: Kip Taylor (4th season)
- Home stadium: Bell Field; Multnomah Stadium

1952 Pacific Coast Conference football standings
	Conf.					Overall
Team	W		L		T	W		L		T
No. 5 USC $	6	–	0	–	0	10	–	1	–	0
No. 6 UCLA	5	–	1	–	0	8	–	1	–	0
Washington	6	–	2	–	0	7	–	3	–	0
California	3	–	3	–	0	7	–	3	–	0
Washington State	3	–	4	–	0	4	–	6	–	0
Stanford	2	–	5	–	0	5	–	5	–	0
Oregon	2	–	5	–	0	2	–	7	–	1
Idaho	1	–	3	–	0	4	–	4	–	1
Oregon State	1	–	6	–	0	2	–	7	–	0
$ – Conference champion; Rankings from AP Poll

The 1952 Oregon State Beavers football team represented Oregon State College as a member of the Pacific Coast Conference (PCC) during the 1952 college football season. In their fourth season under head coach Kip Taylor, the Beavers compiled an overall record of 2–7 with a mark of 1–6 in conference play, placing last out of nine teams in the PCC, and were outscored 267 to 123.

The team played four home games at Multnomah Stadium in Portland and one on campus at Bell Field in Corvallis, a 27–6 homecoming loss to Idaho in the last varsity game at the venue.

== Schedule ==
Date	Opponent	Site	Result	Attendance	Source
September 20	at Utah*	Ute Stadium; Salt Lake City, UT	W 14–7	15,000	
October 4	No. 1 Michigan State*	Multnomah Stadium; Portland, OR	L 14–17	22,595	
October 11	at Stanford	Stanford Stadium; Stanford, CA	L 28–41	28,000	
October 18	No. 7 USC	Multnomah Stadium; Portland, OR	L 6–28	17,438	
October 25	at Washington State	Rogers Field; Pullman, WA	L 20–33	14,000	
November 1	Washington	Multnomah Stadium; Portland, OR	L 13–38	19,243	
November 8	at No. 5 UCLA	Los Angeles Memorial Coliseum; Los Angeles, CA	L 0–57	22,585	
November 15	Idaho^{†}	Bell Field; Corvallis, OR	L 6–27	8,000	
November 22	vs. Oregon	Multnomah Stadium; Portland, OR (Civil War)	W 22–19	21,333	
*Non-conference game; ^{†}Homecoming; Rankings from AP Poll released prior to the game; Source:

== Coaching staff ==
- Len Younce, line
- Ward Cuff, backs
- Butch Morse, ends
- Fred Sutherland
- Hal Moe, freshmen
