= 1952 Pacific Tigers football team =

American college football season

1952 Pacific Tigers football

Sun Bowl, W 26–7 vs Mississippi Southern
- Conference: Independent
- Record: 7–3–1
- Head coach: Ernie Jorge (2nd season)
- Home stadium: Pacific Memorial Stadium

1952 Western college football independents records
	Conf.			Overall
Team	W	L	T	W		L		T
Fresno State		–		8	–	2	–	0
Pacific (CA)		–		7	–	3	–	1
San Jose State		–		6	–	3	–	0
La Verne		–		5	–	3	–	1
Hawaii		–		5	–	5	–	2
Cal Poly San Dimas		–		4	–	4	–	0
Nevada		–		2	–	2	–	0
Santa Clara		–		2	–	6	–	1

The 1952 Pacific Tigers football team represented the College of the Pacific (Note: University of the Pacific (UOP) was known as College of the Pacific from 1911 to 1961.) during the 1952 college football season. Pacific played home games in Pacific Memorial Stadium (Note: Amos Alonzo Stagg Memorial Stadium was known as Pacific Memorial Stadium from its opening in 1950 through 1987.) in Stockton, California.

Pacific competed as an independent in 1952. In their second season under head coach Ernie Jorge, the Tigers finished the regular season with a record of six wins, three losses and one tie (6–3–1). At the end of the season, Pacific was invited to a New Years Day bowl game for the second consecutive year. On January 1, 1953, they played Mississippi Southern in the Sun Bowl, winning 26–7. That brought their record to seven wins, three losses and one tie (7–3–1). For the season they outscored their opponents 310–166.

== Schedule ==
Date	Opponent	Site	Result	Attendance	Source
September 20	at No. 8 California	Memorial Stadium; Berkeley, CA	L 13–34	45,000	
September 27	at Utah State	Romney Stadium (Note: This stadium is the predecessor to the current Maverik Stadium (Romney Stadium) that has served as the home of the Aggies since 1968); Logan, UT	W 34–7	10,000	
October 4	Texas Tech	Pacific Memorial Stadium; Stockton, CA	W 42–21	15,700	
October 18	San Jose State	Pacific Memorial Stadium; Stockton, CA (Victory Bell)	L 21–26	29,159	
October 25	San Diego NTS (Note: Naval Training Center San Diego (Naval Training Station) was a U.S. Navy facility from 1923 to 1997.)	Pacific Memorial Stadium; Stockton, CA	L 7–25	11,458	
November 1	at Oregon	Hayward Field; Eugene, OR	W 14–6	7,200	
November 8	at Santa Clara	Pacific Memorial Stadium; Stockton, CA	W 27–0	15,280	
November 15	Fresno State	Pacific Memorial Stadium; Stockton, CA	W 50–0	7,155 (Note: There were 10,000 tickets sold, but rain caused 3,000 no-shows, per Stockton Record.)	
November 29	Marquette	Pacific Memorial Stadium; Stockton, CA	T 27–27	7,304	
December 5	at Hawaii	Honolulu Stadium; Honolulu, HI	W 49–13	7,000	
January 1	at Mississippi Southern	Kidd Field; El Paso, TX (Sun Bowl)	W 26–7	11,000	
Rankings from AP Poll released prior to the game
