= 1952 Washington State Cougars football team =

American college football season

1952 Washington State Cougars football
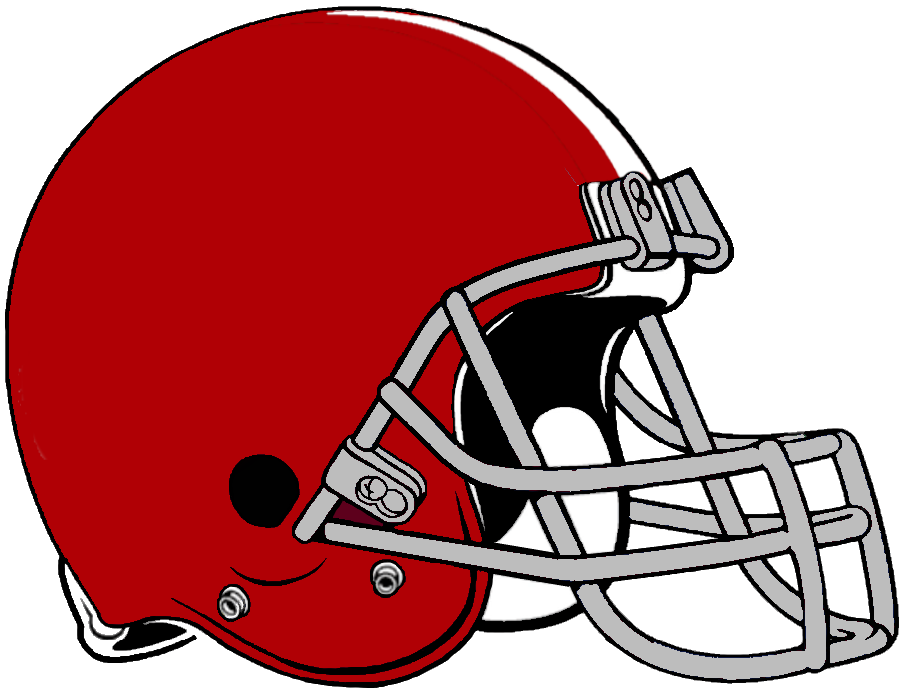
- Conference: Pacific Coast Conference
- Record: 4–6 (3–4 PCC)
- Head coach: Al Kircher (1st season)
- Captain: Don Steinbrunner
- Home stadium: Rogers Field, Memorial Stadium

1952 Pacific Coast Conference football standings
	Conf.					Overall
Team	W		L		T	W		L		T
No. 5 USC $	6	–	0	–	0	10	–	1	–	0
No. 6 UCLA	5	–	1	–	0	8	–	1	–	0
Washington	6	–	2	–	0	7	–	3	–	0
California	3	–	3	–	0	7	–	3	–	0
Washington State	3	–	4	–	0	4	–	6	–	0
Stanford	2	–	5	–	0	5	–	5	–	0
Oregon	2	–	5	–	0	2	–	7	–	1
Idaho	1	–	3	–	0	4	–	4	–	1
Oregon State	1	–	6	–	0	2	–	7	–	0
$ – Conference champion; Rankings from AP Poll

The 1952 Washington State Cougars football team was an American football team that represented Washington State College during the 1952 college football season. First-year head coach Al Kircher led the team to a 3–4 mark in the Pacific Coast Conference (PCC) and 4–6 overall.

Three home games were played on campus in Pullman at Rogers Field, and one in Spokane, the finale against rival Washington.

Kircher was previously the backfield coach under head coach Forest Evashevski, who left for Iowa in January, and he was promoted the following week.

== Schedule ==
Date	Opponent	Rank	Site	Result	Attendance	Source
September 19	at No. 16 USC	No. 15	Los Angeles Memorial Coliseum; Los Angeles, CA	L 7–35	58,288	
September 27	No. 13 Stanford	No. 15	Rogers Field; Pullman, WA	L 13–14	25,000	
October 4	at Baylor*		Baylor Stadium; Waco, TX	L 7–31	17,000	
October 18	at No. 16 Ohio State*		Ohio Stadium; Columbus, OH	L 7–35	71,280	
October 25	Oregon State^{†}		Rogers Field; Pullman, WA	W 33–20	14,000	
November 1	Idaho		Rogers Field; Pullman, WA (Battle of the Palouse)	W 36–6	14,000	
November 8	at Oregon		Hayward Field; Eugene, OR	W 19–6	12,500	
November 15	at California		California Memorial Stadium; Berkeley, CA	L 13–28	26,000	
November 22	at Oklahoma A&M*		Lewis Field; Stillwater, OK	W 9–7	10,000	
November 29	Washington		Memorial Stadium; Spokane, WA (rivalry)	L 27–33	30,000	
*Non-conference game; ^{†}Homecoming; Rankings from AP Poll released prior to the game; Source:
