= Dick Sprague =

American football player (1931–2008)

Profile
- Position: Defensive back

Personal information
- Born: November 13, 1931; Spokane, Washington, U.S.
- Died: May 28, 2008 (aged 76); Medina, Washington, U.S.

Career information
- High school: Spokane (WA) Gonzaga Prep
- College: Washington

Awards and highlights
- First-team All-American (1950); First-team All-PCC (1950)

Richard Severn Sprague (November 13, 1931 – May 28, 2008) was an American football player. He played college football for the Washington Huskies football team and, as a sophomore, was selected by the Football Writers Association of America as a first-team defensive player on their 1950 College Football All-America Team. Sprague passed on an opportunity to play in the National Football League (NFL) to study law at Harvard Law School. At Harvard, he also coached football. He worked as an attorney at the Bogle and Gates law firm for 40 years and at Kemper Development Co. in Bellevue, Washington, for several years after that. He died of prostate cancer in 2008 at age 77 at his home in Medina, Washington.

== See also ==
- Washington Huskies football statistical leaders
