= 1952 San Francisco State Gators football team =

American college football season

1952 San Francisco State Gators football
- Conference: Far Western Conference
- Record: 3–6, 1 win forfeited (1–0 FWC)
- Head coach: Joe Verducci (3rd season)
- Home stadium: Cox Stadium

1952 Far Western Conference football standings
	Conf.					Overall
Team	W		L		T	W		L		T
Humboldt State $	3	–	0	–	0	7	–	1	–	0
Cal Aggies	2	–	1	–	0	2	–	7	–	0
San Francisco State	1	–	0	–	0	3	–	6	–	0
Chico State	1	–	3	–	0	1	–	6	–	0
Southern Oregon	0	–	3	–	0	3	–	5	–	0
$ – Conference champion

The 1952 San Francisco State Gators football team represented San Francisco State College—now known as San Francisco State University—as a member of the Far Western Conference (FWC) during the 1952 college football season. Led by third-year head coach Joe Verducci, San Francisco State compiled an overall record of 4–5 with a mark of 1–0 in conference play, placing third in the FWC. For the season the team was outscored by its opponents 219 to 211. The Gators played home games at Cox Stadium in San Francisco.

After the season, San Francisco State forfeited its non-conference win over Whittier, due to the ineligibility of the Gators' Al Endress, who had signed a professional baseball contract in 1950. With the forfeit, San Francisco State's overall record fell to 3–6.

== Schedule ==
Date	Opponent	Site	Result	Attendance	Source
September 26	Pepperdine*	Cox Stadium; San Francisco CA	W 21–0		
October 3	Whittier*	Cox Stadium; San Francisco, CA	L 38–26 (forfeit loss)		
October 11	Occidental*	Cox Stadium; San Francisco, CA	W 14–0		
October 18	at Cal Poly*	Mustang Stadium; San Luis Obispo, CA	L 26–34		
October 25	at Santa Barbara*	La Playa Stadium; Santa Barbara, CA	L 6–20		
October 31	Chico State	Cox Stadium; San Francisco, CA	W 39–19		
November 8	at San Diego State*	Aztec Bowl; San Diego, CA	L 28–39	5,000	
November 15	at College of Idaho*	Hayman Field; Caldwell, ID	L 19–33		
November 22	at Fresno State*	Ratcliffe Stadium; Fresno, CA	L 20–48	5,119	
*Non-conference game
