= 1952 Cal Poly Mustangs football team =

American college football season

1952 Cal Poly Mustangs football

CCAA champion
- Conference: California Collegiate Athletic Association
- Record: 7–3 (4–0 CCAA)
- Head coach: LeRoy Hughes (3rd season)
- Home stadium: Mustang Stadium

1952 California Collegiate Athletic Association football standings
| | Conf. | | | | | Overall |
| Team | W | | L | | T | W | | L | | T |
|---|---|---|---|---|---|---|---|---|---|---|
| Cal Poly $ | 4 | – | 0 | – | 0 | 7 | – | 3 | – | 0 |
| Santa Barbara | 3 | – | 1 | – | 0 | 8 | – | 2 | – | 0 |
| San Diego State | 2 | – | 2 | – | 0 | 4 | – | 5 | – | 0 |
| Los Angeles State | 1 | – | 3 | – | 0 | 4 | – | 4 | – | 0 |
| Pepperdine | 0 | – | 4 | – | 0 | 2 | – | 7 | – | 0 |
$ – Conference champion

The 1952 Cal Poly Mustangs football team represented California Polytechnic State College—now known as California Polytechnic State University, San Luis Obispo—as a member of the California Collegiate Athletic Association (CCAA) during the 1952 college football season. Led by third-year head coach LeRoy Hughes, Cal Poly compiled an overall record of 7–3 with a mark of 4–0 in conference play, winning the CCAA title. The Mustangs played home games at Mustang Stadium in San Luis Obispo, California.

== Schedule ==
| Date | Opponent | Site | Result | Attendance | Source |
|---|---|---|---|---|---|
| September 20 | at Sul Ross | Jackson Field; Alpine, TX | L 7–28 | | |
| September 27 | at Bradley | Peoria, IL | L 0–21 | | |
| October 4 | San Diego State | Mustang Stadium; San Luis Obispo, CA | W 20–18 | 5,000 | |
| October 10 | at Santa Barbara | La Playa Stadium; Santa Barbara, CA | W 19–0 | | |
| October 18 | San Francisco State* | Mustang Stadium; San Luis Obispo, CA | W 34–26 | | |
| October 25 | Pepperdine | Mustang Stadium; San Luis Obispo, CA | W 39–13 | | |
| November 1 | Whittier* | Mustang Stadium; San Luis Obispo, CA | L 20–42 | | |
| November 8 | Los Angeles State | Mustang Stadium; San Luis Obispo, CA | W 32–7 | | |
| November 15 | at Redlands* | Redlands Stadium (Note: This stadium is the predecessor to the current Ted Runner Stadium on the University of Redlands campus, which was opened for the 1968 season); Redlands, CA | W 26–6 | | |
| November 22 | Missouri Valley* | Mustang Stadium; San Luis Obispo, CA | W 27–14 | | |
*Non-conference game
