= Duck Dowell =

American coach and basketball player (1912–2003)

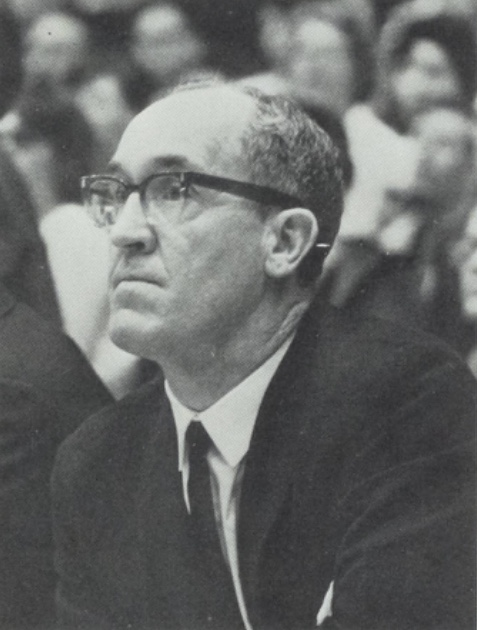
- Dowell from the 1963 “Promenade”

Biographical details
- Born: August 14, 1912; Gilman City, Missouri, U.S.
- Died: November 27, 2003 (aged 91); Yucca Valley, California, U.S.

Playing career

Football
- 1929–1931: NW Missouri State

Basketball
- 1928–1932: NW Missouri State
- 1936–1937: Denver Piggly Wigglies
- 1937–1938: Akron Firestone Non-Skids
- Position: Forward / center (basketball)

Coaching career (HC unless noted)

Football
- 1951–1952: Pepperdine

Basketball
- 1945–1947: High school
- 1947–1948: Modesto JC
- 1948–1968: Pepperdine

Administrative career (AD unless noted)
- 1955–1968: Pepperdine

Head coaching record
- Overall: 7–11–1 (college football); 263–263 (college basketball)

Accomplishments and honors

Championships
- 5 conference (1950–1953, 1962)

Awards
- WCAC Coach of the Year (1962)

Robert Loren "Duck" Dowell (August 14, 1912 – November 27, 2003) was an American professional basketball player for the Akron Firestone Non-Skids in the United States' National Basketball League during the 1937–38 season. After an All-American collegiate career at Northwest Missouri State, Dowell also competed in the Amateur Athletic Union (AAU) for the Denver Piggly Wigglies.

Dowell also served as Pepperdine University's head coach for the men's basketball and football teams. As the basketball coach, he compiled an overall record of 263 wins and 263 losses between 1948–49 and 1967–68. Pepperdine won the California Collegiate Athletic Association titles for four consecutive seasons, from 1950 to 1953. His 1961–62 squad won the West Coast Conference and advanced the 1962 NCAA Tournament's West Regional semifinal round. Dowell also coached the football team during the 1951 and 1952 seasons, which are described as "rebuilding" years in the school's football archive.

== Career statistics ==
Legend
GP	Games played	FGM	Field goals made
FTM	Free throws made	FTA	Free throws attempted
FT%	Free throw percentage	PTS	Total points
PPG	Points per game	**Bold**	Career high

=== NBL ===
==== Regular season ====
Year	Team	GP	FGM	FTM	PTS	PPG
1937–38	Akron F.N.S.	14	15	19	49	3.5

==== Playoffs ====
Year	Team	GP	FGM	FTM	PTS	PPG
1937–38	Akron F.N.S.	2	1	0	2	1.0

== Head coaching record ==
=== College football ===
Year	Team	Overall	Conference	Standing	Bowl/playoffs
**Pepperdine Waves** (California Collegiate Athletic Association) (1951–1952)
1951	Pepperdine	5–4–1	2–1–1	T–2nd	
1952	Pepperdine	2–7	0–4	5th	
Pepperdine:		7–11–1	2–5–1		
Total:		7–11–1			
