= 1952 Oregon Ducks football team =

American college football season

1952 Oregon Ducks football
- Conference: Pacific Coast Conference
- Record: 2–7–1 (2–5 PCC)
- Head coach: Len Casanova (2nd season)
- Captain: Monte Brethauer
- Home stadium: Hayward Field, Multnomah Stadium

1952 Pacific Coast Conference football standings
	Conf.					Overall
Team	W		L		T	W		L		T
No. 5 USC $	6	–	0	–	0	10	–	1	–	0
No. 6 UCLA	5	–	1	–	0	8	–	1	–	0
Washington	6	–	2	–	0	7	–	3	–	0
California	3	–	3	–	0	7	–	3	–	0
Washington State	3	–	4	–	0	4	–	6	–	0
Stanford	2	–	5	–	0	5	–	5	–	0
Oregon	2	–	5	–	0	2	–	7	–	1
Idaho	1	–	3	–	0	4	–	4	–	1
Oregon State	1	–	6	–	0	2	–	7	–	0
$ – Conference champion; Rankings from AP Poll

The 1952 Oregon Ducks football team represented the University of Oregon as a member of the Pacific Coast Conference (PCC) during the 1952 college football season. In their second season under head coach Len Casanova, the Ducks compiled a 2–7–1 record (2–5 against PCC opponents), finished in a tie for sixth place in the PCC, and were outscored by their opponents, 234 to 112. The team played home games at Hayward Field in Eugene, Oregon.

== Schedule ==
Date	Opponent	Site	Result	Attendance	Source
September 20	at No. 18 UCLA	Los Angeles Memorial Coliseum; Los Angeles, CA	L 6–13	24,587	
September 27	Nebraska*	Multnomah Stadium; Portland, OR	L 13–28	24,061	
October 4	at Idaho	Neale Stadium; Moscow, ID	W 20–14	11,542	
October 11	No. 3 California	Multnomah Stadium; Portland, OR	L 7–41	17,793	
October 18	at Washington	Husky Stadium; Seattle, WA (rivalry)	L 0–49	35,000	
October 25	Montana*	Hayward Field; Eugene, OR	T 14–14	9,000	
November 1	Pacific (CA)*	Hayward Field; Eugene, OR	L 6–14	7,200	
November 8	Washington State	Hayward Field; Eugene, OR	L 6–19	12,500	
November 15	at Stanford	Stanford Stadium; Stanford, CA	W 21–20	6,100	
November 22	vs. Oregon State	Multnomah Stadium; Portland, OR (Civil War)	L 19–22	21,333	
*Non-conference game; Rankings from AP Poll released prior to the game; Source:
