= 1952 UCLA Bruins football team =

American college football season

1952 UCLA Bruins football
- Conference: Pacific Coast Conference

Ranking
- Coaches: No. 6
- AP: No. 6
- Record: 8–1 (5–1 PCC)
- Head coach: Red Sanders (4th season)
- Offensive scheme: Single-wing
- Home stadium: Los Angeles Memorial Coliseum

1952 Pacific Coast Conference football standings
	Conf.					Overall
Team	W		L		T	W		L		T
No. 5 USC $	6	–	0	–	0	10	–	1	–	0
No. 6 UCLA	5	–	1	–	0	8	–	1	–	0
Washington	6	–	2	–	0	7	–	3	–	0
California	3	–	3	–	0	7	–	3	–	0
Washington State	3	–	4	–	0	4	–	6	–	0
Stanford	2	–	5	–	0	5	–	5	–	0
Oregon	2	–	5	–	0	2	–	7	–	1
Idaho	1	–	3	–	0	4	–	4	–	1
Oregon State	1	–	6	–	0	2	–	7	–	0
$ – Conference champion; Rankings from AP Poll

The 1952 UCLA Bruins football team was an American football team that represented the University of California, Los Angeles in the Pacific Coast Conference (PCC) during the 1952 college football season. In their fourth year under head coach Red Sanders, the Bruins compiled an 8–1 record (5–1 in PCC, second).

== Schedule ==
Date	Opponent	Rank	Site	Result	Attendance	Source
September 20	Oregon	No. 18	Los Angeles Memorial Coliseum; Los Angeles, CA	W 13–6	24,587	
September 27	No. 9 TCU*	No. 18	Los Angeles Memorial Coliseum; Los Angeles, CA	W 14–0	34,158	
October 4	at Washington	No. 14	Husky Stadium; Seattle, WA	W 32–7	43,000	
October 11	Rice	No. 11	Los Angeles Memorial Coliseum; Los Angeles, CA	W 20–0	30,926	
October 18	No. 13 Stanford	No. 10	Los Angeles Memorial Coliseum; Los Angeles, CA	W 24–14	80,617	
October 25	at No. 10 Wisconsin*	No. 8	Camp Randall Stadium; Madison, WI	W 20–7	52,131	
November 1	at No. 11 California	No. 7	California Memorial Stadium; Berkeley, CA (rivalry)	W 28–7	82,000	
November 8	Oregon State	No. 5	Los Angeles Memorial Coliseum; Los Angeles, CA	W 57–0	22,585	
November 22	No. 4 USC	No. 3	Los Angeles Memorial Coliseum; Los Angeles, CA (Victory Bell)	L 12–14	96,869	
*Non-conference game; Rankings from AP Poll released prior to the game; Source:
