= 1952 California Golden Bears football team =

American college football season

1952 California Golden Bears football
- Conference: Pacific Coast Conference
- Record: 7–3 (3–3 PCC)
- Head coach: Pappy Waldorf (6th season)
- Offensive scheme: Single-wing
- Home stadium: California Memorial Stadium

1952 Pacific Coast Conference football standings
	Conf.					Overall
Team	W		L		T	W		L		T
No. 5 USC $	6	–	0	–	0	10	–	1	–	0
No. 6 UCLA	5	–	1	–	0	8	–	1	–	0
Washington	6	–	2	–	0	7	–	3	–	0
California	3	–	3	–	0	7	–	3	–	0
Washington State	3	–	4	–	0	4	–	6	–	0
Stanford	2	–	5	–	0	5	–	5	–	0
Oregon	2	–	5	–	0	2	–	7	–	1
Idaho	1	–	3	–	0	4	–	4	–	1
Oregon State	1	–	6	–	0	2	–	7	–	0
$ – Conference champion; Rankings from AP Poll

The 1952 California Golden Bears football team was an American football team that represented the University of California, Berkeley in the Pacific Coast Conference (PCC) during the 1952 college football season. Under sixth-year head coach Pappy Waldorf, the Golden Bears compiled an overall record of 7–3 (3–3 in PCC, fourth). Home games were played on campus at California Memorial Stadium in Berkeley, California.

== Schedule ==
Date	Opponent	Rank	Site	Result	Attendance	Source
September 20	Pacific (CA)*	No. 8	California Memorial Stadium; Berkeley, CA	W 34–13	45,000	
September 27	Missouri*	No. 8	California Memorial Stadium; Berkeley, CA	W 28–14	45,000	
October 4	at Minnesota*	No. 4	Memorial Stadium; Minneapolis, MN	W 49–13	56.708	
October 11	at Oregon	No. 3	Multnomah Stadium; Portland, OR	W 41–7	17,793	
October 18	Santa Clara*	No. 3	California Memorial Stadium; Berkeley, CA	W 27–7	33,000	
October 25	at No. 7 USC	No. 4	Los Angeles Memorial Coliseum; Los Angeles, CA	L 0–10	94,677	
November 1	No. 7 UCLA	No. 11	California Memorial Stadium; Berkeley, CA (rivalry)	L 7–28	82,000	
November 8	at Washington		Husky Stadium; Seattle, WA	L 7–22	51,000	
November 15	Washington State		California Memorial Stadium; Berkeley, CA	W 28–13	26,000	
November 22	Stanford		California Memorial Stadium; Berkeley, CA (Big Game)	W 26–0	83,000	
*Non-conference game; Rankings from AP Poll released prior to the game; Source:
