= 1953 NFL draft =

National Football League draft

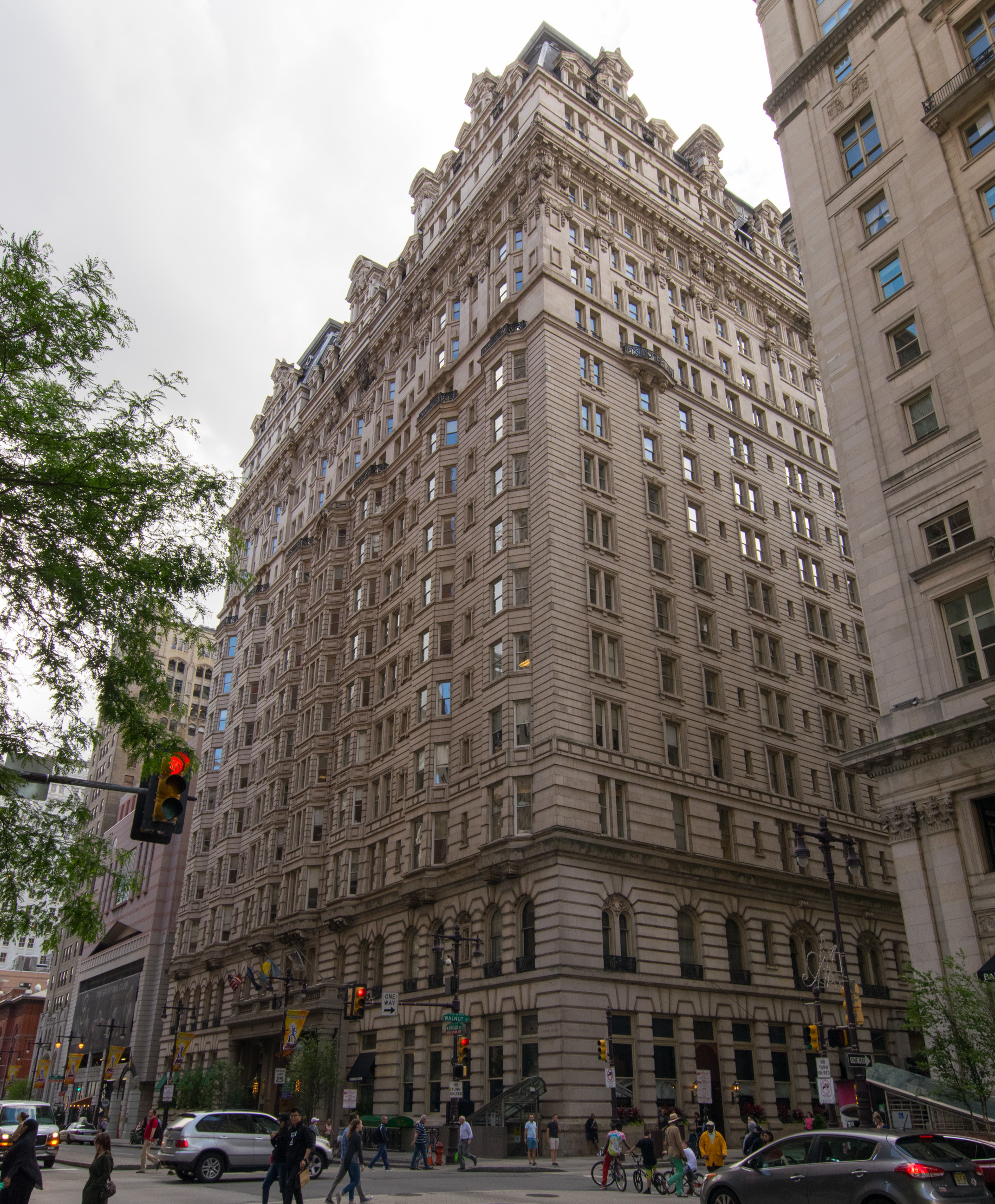
- The Bellevue-Stratford Hotel in Philadelphia, where the 1953 NFL Draft was held

General information
- Date: January 22, 1953
- Location: The Bellevue-Stratford Hotel in Philadelphia, Pennsylvania

Overview
- 360 total selections in 30 rounds
- League: NFL
- First selection: Harry Babcock, DE; San Francisco 49ers
- Most selections (33): Chicago Bears
- Fewest selections (25): Washington Redskins
- Hall of Famers: 8: DE Doug Atkins; FB John Henry Johnson; OT Bob St. Clair; DT Stan Jones; C Jim Ringo; LB Joe Schmidt; G Chuck Noll (Note: Inducted as a HC); OT Roosevelt Brown

The 1953 National Football League draft was held on January 22, 1953, at The Bellevue-Stratford Hotel in Philadelphia. Selections made by the folded Dallas Texans were assigned to the Baltimore Colts, since the Dallas team had moved to Baltimore.

This was the seventh year that the first overall pick was a bonus pick determined by lottery, with the previous six winners (Chicago Bears in 1947, Washington Redskins in 1948, Philadelphia Eagles in 1949, Detroit Lions in 1950, New York Giants in 1951, and Los Angeles Rams in 1952) ineligible from the draw; it was won by the San Francisco 49ers, who selected end Harry Babcock.

== Player selections ==
= Pro Bowler	= Hall of Famer

=== Round 1 ===
Pick #	NFL team	Player	Position	College
1	San Francisco 49ers ^{(Lottery bonus pick)}	Harry Babcock	End	Georgia
2	Baltimore Colts	Billy Vessels	Halfback	Oklahoma
3	Washington Redskins	Jack Scarbath	Back	Maryland
4	Chicago Cardinals	Johnny Olszewski	Fullback	California
5	Pittsburgh Steelers	Ted Marchibroda	Quarterback	Detroit
6	Chicago Bears	Billy Anderson	Halfback	Compton CC
7	Green Bay Packers	Al Carmichael	Halfback	USC
8	New York Giants	Bobby Marlow	Halfback	Alabama
9	Los Angeles Rams ^{(From Philadelphia Eagles)}	Donn Moomaw	Center	UCLA
10	San Francisco 49ers	Tom Stolhandske	End	Texas
11	Cleveland Browns	Doug Atkins	End	Tennessee
12	Los Angeles Rams	Ed Barker	End	Washington State
13	Detroit Lions	Harley Sewell	Guard	Texas

- ^{HOF} Member of the Professional Football Hall of Fame

=== Round 2 ===
Pick #	NFL team	Player	Position	College
14	Baltimore Colts	Bernie Flowers	End	Purdue
15	Chicago Cardinals	Jim Psaltis	Back	USC
16	Washington Redskins	Dick Modzelewski	Defensive tackle	Maryland
17	Chicago Bears	Zeke Bratkowski	Quarterback	Georgia
18	Pittsburgh Steelers	John Henry Johnson	Fullback	Arizona State
19	Green Bay Packers	Gil Reich	Back	Kansas
20	Philadelphia Eagles	Al Conway	Back	Army
21	San Francisco 49ers	George Morris	Center	Georgia Tech
22	New York Giants	Eddie Crowder	Quarterback	Oklahoma
23	Cleveland Browns	Billy Reynolds	Back	Pittsburgh
24	Los Angeles Rams	Rudy Bukich	Quarterback	USC
25	Detroit Lions	Gene Gedman	Back	Indiana

=== Round 3 ===
Pick #	NFL team	Player	Position	College
26	Baltimore Colts	Buck McPhail	Back	Oklahoma
27	Washington Redskins	Paul Dekker	End	Michigan State
28	Chicago Cardinals	Dale Samuels	Quarterback	Purdue
29	Pittsburgh Steelers	Marv Matuszak	Tackle	Tulsa
30	Chicago Bears	Bill Rowekamp	Back	Missouri
31	Green Bay Packers	Bill Forester	Tackle	SMU
32	San Francisco 49ers	Bob St. Clair	Offensive tackle	San Francisco
33	New York Giants	Cal Roberts	Tackle	Gustavus Adolphus
34	Philadelphia Eagles	Don Johnson	Back	California
35	Cleveland Browns	Fred Bruney	Back	Ohio State
36	Los Angeles Rams	Bob Fry	Tackle	Kentucky
37	Cleveland Browns	Gene Donaldson	Guard	Kentucky
38	Cleveland Browns	Jim Hietikko	Tackle	Ohio State

=== Round 4 ===
Pick #	NFL team	Player	Position	College
39	Baltimore Colts	Tom Catlin	Center	Oklahoma
40	Chicago Cardinals	Buck Martin	End	Georgia Tech
41	Washington Redskins	Don Boll	Guard	Nebraska
42	Chicago Bears	Joe Koch	Back	Wake Forest
43	Pittsburgh Steelers	Lloyd Colteryahn	End	Maryland
44	Green Bay Packers	Gib Dawson	Back	Texas
45	New York Giants	Dewayne Douglas	Tackle	Florida
46	Philadelphia Eagles	George Mrkonic	Guard	Kansas
47	San Francisco 49ers	Ed Fullerton	Back	Maryland
48	Cleveland Browns	Dick Tamburo	Center	Michigan State
49	Los Angeles Rams	Willie Roberts	End	Tulsa
50	Detroit Lions	Charlie Ane	Tackle	USC

=== Round 5 ===
Pick #	NFL team	Player	Position	College
50	Baltimore Colts	Jack Little	Tackle	Texas A&M
51	Washington Redskins	Nick Carras	Back	Missouri
52	Chicago Cardinals	Bill Shalosky	Guard	Cincinnati
53	Pittsburgh Steelers	Bob Gaona	Tackle	Wake Forest
54	Chicago Bears	Stan Jones	Guard	Maryland
55	Green Bay Packers	Roger Zatkoff	Tackle	Michigan
56	Philadelphia Eagles	Eddie Bell	Halfback	Penn
57	San Francisco 49ers	Hal Miller	Tackle	Georgia Tech
58	New York Giants	Buford Long	Back	Florida
59	Cleveland Browns	Bob Van Doren	End	USC
60	Los Angeles Rams	Tom Scott	End	Virginia
61	Philadelphia Eagles	Rex Smith	End	Illinois

=== Round 6 ===
Pick #	NFL team	Player	Position	College
62	Baltimore Colts	Jim Sears	Back	USC
63	Chicago Cardinals	Tony Curcillo	Back	Ohio State
64	Los Angeles Rams	Paul Miller	Tackle	LSU
65	Chicago Bears	Art DeCarlo	Back	Georgia
66	Pittsburgh Steelers	Tom Barton	Guard	Clemson
67	Green Bay Packers	Bob Kennedy	Guard	Wisconsin
68	Chicago Bears	Kline Gilbert	Tackle	Ole Miss
69	New York Giants	Bob Peviani	Guard	USC
70	Chicago Cardinals	Tom Higgins	Tackle	North Carolina
71	Cleveland Browns	Don Steinbrunner	End	Washington State
72	Los Angeles Rams	Howard Waugh	Back	Tulsa
73	Detroit Lions	Ollie Spencer	Tackle	Kansas

=== Round 7 ===
Pick #	NFL team	Player	Position	College
74	Baltimore Colts	Bill Athey	Guard	Baylor
75	Chicago Bears	Bucky McElroy	Back	Mississippi Southern
76	Philadelphia Eagles	Jack Erickson	Tackle	Beloit
77	Pittsburgh Steelers	John Alderton	End	Maryland
78	Chicago Bears	Don Bingham	Back	Sul Ross
79	Green Bay Packers	Jim Ringo	Center	Syracuse
80	New York Giants	Don Branby	End	Colorado
81	Philadelphia Eagles	Ray Malavasi	Guard	Mississippi State
82	San Francisco 49ers	Paul Carr	Back	Houston
83	Cleveland Browns	Gene Filipski	Back	Villanova
84	Los Angeles Rams	Bobby Reynolds	Back	Nebraska
85	Detroit Lions	Joe Schmidt	Linebacker	Pittsburgh

=== Round 8 ===
Pick #	NFL team	Player	Position	College
86	Baltimore Colts	Jim Prewett	Tackle	Tulsa
87	Chicago Cardinals	Jerry Watford	Guard	Alabama
88	Washington Redskins	Lew Weidensaul	End	Maryland
89	Chicago Bears	John Kreamcheck	Tackle	William & Mary
90	Pittsburgh Steelers	Lowell W. Perry	End	Michigan
91	Green Bay Packers	Lauren Hargrove	Back	Georgia
92	Philadelphia Eagles	Jess Richardson	Tackle	Alabama
93	San Francisco 49ers	Doug Hogland	Tackle	Oregon State
94	New York Giants	Don Beck	Back	Notre Dame
95	Cleveland Browns	Carlton Massey	End	Texas
96	Los Angeles Rams	Bob Morgan	Tackle	Maryland
97	Detroit Lions	Lew Carpenter	Back	Arkansas

=== Round 9 ===
Pick #	NFL team	Player	Position	College
98	Baltimore Colts	Bob Blair	End	TCU
99	Chicago Cardinals	Ed Husmann	Guard	Nebraska
100	Chicago Cardinals	Avatus Stone	Back	Syracuse
101	Pittsburgh Steelers	Pat Sarnese	Tackle	Temple
102	Chicago Bears	Bruno Ashley	Tackle	East Texas State
103	Green Bay Packers	Floyd Harrawood	Tackle	Tulsa
104	San Francisco 49ers	Hal Ledyard	Back	Chattanooga
105	New York Giants	Jim Gray	Back	Panola
106	Philadelphia Eagles	Roger French	End	Minnesota
107	Cleveland Browns	Bob McNamara	Back	Minnesota
108	Los Angeles Rams	Brad Myers	Back	Bucknell
109	Detroit Lions	Carlton McCormick	Center	TCU

=== Round 10 ===
Pick #	NFL team	Player	Position	College
110	Baltimore Colts	John Cole	Back	Arkansas
111	Chicago Cardinals	Charley Berndt	Tackle	Wisconsin
112	New York Giants	Darrow Hooper	End	Texas A&M
113	Chicago Bears	Jimmy Moore	Back	Florida A&M
114	Pittsburgh Steelers	Frank Holohan	Tackle	Tennessee
115	Green Bay Packers	Vic Rimkus	Guard	Holy Cross
116	New York Giants	Charlie Maloy	Quarterback	Holy Cross
117	Philadelphia Eagles	Tom Brookshier	Back	Colorado
118	San Francisco 49ers	Pete Brown	Guard	Georgia Tech
119	Cleveland Browns	Elmo Natali	Back	California (PA)
120	Los Angeles Rams	Mick Lakos	Back	Vanderbilt
121	Detroit Lions	Dreher Gaskin	End	Clemson

=== Round 11 ===
Pick #	NFL team	Player	Position	College
122	Baltimore Colts	Gene Rossi	Back	Cincinnati
123	Washington Redskins	Alex Webster	Back	NC State
124	Chicago Cardinals	Ed Woodsum	End	Yale
125	Chicago Bears	Ralph Charney	Back	Kentucky
126	Chicago Bears	Jim Slowey	Center	Georgetown
127	Green Bay Packers	Joe Johnson	Back	Boston College
128	Philadelphia Eagles	Bob Pollard	Back	Penn State
129	San Francisco 49ers	Al Charlton	Back	Washington State
130	New York Giants	Jim Ruehl	Center	Ohio State
131	Cleveland Browns	Dick Hilinski	Tackle	Ohio State
132	Los Angeles Rams	Jim Bailey	Back	Miami (OH)
133	Detroit Lions	Elmer Messenger	Guard	Washington State

=== Round 12 ===
Pick #	NFL team	Player	Position	College
134	Baltimore Colts	Kaye Vaughan	Guard	Tulsa
135	Chicago Cardinals	Chuck Spaulding	Back	Wyoming
136	Washington Redskins	Buzz Nutter	Center	VPI
137	Chicago Bears	Jim Lawrence	Tackle	Duke
138	Pittsburgh Steelers	Jerry Robertson	Back	Kansas
139	Green Bay Packers	Dick Curran	Back	Arizona State
140	San Francisco 49ers	Red Leach	Guard	Duke
141	New York Giants	Joe Matesic	Tackle	Arizona State
142	Philadelphia Eagles	George Porter	Tackle	San Jose State
143	Cleveland Browns	Elmer Wilhoite	Guard	USC
144	Los Angeles Rams	Chuck Doud	Guard	UCLA
145	Detroit Lions	Larry Spencer	Back	Wake Forest

=== Round 13 ===
Pick #	NFL team	Player	Position	College
146	Baltimore Colts	Bobby Morehead	Back	Georgia Tech
147	Chicago Cardinals	Frank McPhee	End	Princeton
148	Chicago Cardinals	Ronnie Morris	Back	Tulsa
149	Pittsburgh Steelers	Leo Davis	End	Bradley
150	Chicago Bears	Larry Strickland	Center	North Texas State
151	Green Bay Packers	Bob Orders	Center	West Virginia
152	New York Giants	Jack McShulski	End	Kansas State
153	Philadelphia Eagles	Ray Westort	Guard	Utah
154	San Francisco 49ers	Bill Earley	Back	Washington
155	Cleveland Browns	Galen Fiss	Back	Kansas
156	Los Angeles Rams	Andy Matto	Tackle	Cincinnati
157	Detroit Lions	Bob Thomas	End	Washington & Lee

=== Round 14 ===
Pick #	NFL team	Player	Position	College
158	Baltimore Colts	Frank Continetti	Guard	George Washington
159	Chicago Cardinals	Dick Sprague	Back	Washington
160	Washington Redskins	Ed Timmerman	Back	Michigan State
161	Chicago Bears	Harland Carl	Back	Wisconsin
162	Pittsburgh Steelers	Charley Montgomery	Tackle	Mississippi
163	Green Bay Packers	Charley Wrenn	Tackle	Texas Christian
164	Philadelphia Eagles	Roy Bailey	Back	Tulane
165	San Francisco 49ers	Tom Fletcher	Back	Arizona State
166	New York Giants	J. L. Hall	Back	Florida
167	Cleveland Browns	Gern Nagler	End	Santa Clara
168	Los Angeles Rams	Frank James	Guard	Houston
169	Detroit Lions	Jack Barger	Tackle	New Mexico

=== Round 15 ===
Pick #	NFL team	Player	Position	College
170	Baltimore Colts	Buddy Sutton	Back	Arkansas
171	Washington Redskins	Dave Suminski	Tackle	Wisconsin
172	Chicago Cardinals	Nick Chickillo	Guard	Miami (FL)
173	Pittsburgh Steelers	Bob O'Neil	End	Notre Dame
174	Chicago Bears	Ralph Jecha	Guard	Northwestern
175	Green Bay Packers	Gene Helwig	Back	Tulsa
176	San Francisco 49ers	Charley Genthner	Tackle	Texas
177	New York Giants	Dick Bowman	Guard	Oklahoma
178	Philadelphia Eagles	Willie Irvin	End	Florida A&M
179	Cleveland Browns	Johnny Carson	End	Georgia
180	Los Angeles Rams	Tom Carroll	Back	Oklahoma
181	Detroit Lions	Ted Topor	Back	Michigan

=== Round 16 ===
Pick #	NFL team	Player	Position	College
182	Baltimore Colts	Jim Currin	End	Dayton
183	Chicago Cardinals	Jimmy Lear	Back	Mississippi
184	Washington Redskins	Jim Slay	End	Mississippi
185	Chicago Bears	John Hatley	Tackle	Sul Ross
186	Pittsburgh Steelers	John Zachary	Back	Miami (OH)
187	Green Bay Packers	John Hlay	Back	Ohio State
188	New York Giants	Bill Skyinskus	Guard	Syracuse
189	Philadelphia Eagles	Bud Wallace	Back	North Carolina
190	San Francisco 49ers	Fred During	End	Bowling Green
191	Cleveland Browns	Eric Kuykendall	Back	Illinois
192	Los Angeles Rams	Ben DeLoe	Tackle	Mississippi State
193	Detroit Lions	Bob Volonnino	Guard	Army/Villanova

=== Round 17 ===
Pick #	NFL team	Player	Position	College
194	Baltimore Colts	George Rambour	Tackle	Dartmouth
195	Washington Redskins	Bob Haner	Back	Villanova
196	Chicago Cardinals	Earl Heninger	Back	Purdue
197	Pittsburgh Steelers	Reed Quinn	Back	Florida
198	Chicago Bears	Bob Beal	End	California
199	Green Bay Packers	Bill Georges	End	Texas
200	Philadelphia Eagles	Tony Rados	Back	Penn State
201	San Francisco 49ers	Hugh Latham	Tackle	San Diego State
202	New York Giants	Don Rhoden	Center	Rice
203	Cleveland Browns	George Bean	Back	Utah
204	Los Angeles Rams	Harland Svare	End	Washington State
205	Detroit Lions	Ray Green	Tackle	Duke

=== Round 18 ===
Pick #	NFL team	Player	Position	College
206	Baltimore Colts	LeRoy Labat	Back	Louisiana State
207	Chicago Cardinals	Joe Yukica	End	Penn State
208	Washington Redskins	Jim Turner	Back	Texas Tech
209	Chicago Bears	Jim Shirley	Back	Clemson
210	Pittsburgh Steelers	Carl Holben	Tackle	Duke
211	Green Bay Packers	Jim Philee	Back	Bradley
212	San Francisco 49ers	Stan Wacholz	End	San Jose State
213	New York Giants	Phil Suwall	Back	Western Maryland
214	Philadelphia Eagles	Marv Trauth	Tackle	Mississippi
215	Cleveland Browns	Dick Batten	Tackle	Pacific
216	Los Angeles Rams	Lew Jones	Tackle	Wabash
217	Detroit Lions	Ed Mioduszewski	Back	William & Mary

=== Round 19 ===
Pick #	NFL team	Player	Position	College
218	Baltimore Colts	Bill Powell	Back	California
219	Washington Redskins	Tom Flyzik	Tackle	George Washington
220	Chicago Cardinals	Tom Donahue	Center	Wake Forest
221	Pittsburgh Steelers	Jim Williams	Back	Louisville
222	Chicago Bears	Bill Byrus	Tackle	Iowa State
223	Green Bay Packers	Bill Lucky	Tackle	Baylor
224	New York Giants	Hal Lehman	Tackle	Southern Mississippi
225	Philadelphia Eagles	Pete Bachouros	Back	Illinois
226	San Francisco 49ers	King DuClos	Tackle	Texas-El Paso
227	Cleveland Browns	Tom Cain	Guard	Colorado
228	Los Angeles Rams	Jack Ellena	Tackle	UCLA
229	Detroit Lions	Paul Held	Back	San Diego State

=== Round 20 ===
Pick #	NFL team	Player	Position	College
230	Baltimore Colts	Pete Russo	Tackle	Indiana
231	Chicago Cardinals	Len D'Errico	Guard	Boston University
232	Washington Redskins	Bill Link	Guard	Wake Forest
233	Chicago Bears	Tom Mahin	Tackle	Purdue
234	Pittsburgh Steelers	Will Lee Hayley	End	Auburn
235	Green Bay Packers	John Harville	Back	Texas Christian
236	Philadelphia Eagles	Rollie Arns	Center	Iowa State
237	San Francisco 49ers	Ray Huizinga	Tackle	Northwestern
238	New York Giants	Dick Christiansen	End	Arizona
239	Cleveland Browns	Chuck Noll	Linebacker	Dayton
240	Los Angeles Rams	Bob Morford	Back	College of Idaho
241	Detroit Lions	Gerry Hart	Tackle	Army/Mississippi State

=== Round 21 ===
Pick #	NFL team	Player	Position	College
242	Baltimore Colts	Frank Kirby	Tackle	Bucknell
243	Washington Redskins	Jim Dublinski	Center	Utah
244	Chicago Cardinals	Joe Curtis	End	Alabama
245	Pittsburgh Steelers	Don Earley	Guard	South Carolina
246	Chicago Bears	Wayne Martin	End	Texas Christian
247	Green Bay Packers	Bob Conway	Back	Alabama
248	San Francisco 49ers	Ken Bahnsen	End	North Texas State
249	New York Giants	Gene Bullard	Tackle	Louisiana College
250	Philadelphia Eagles	Hal Brooks	Tackle	Washington & Lee
251	Cleveland Browns	Bill Crockett	Guard	Rice
252	Los Angeles Rams	Dick Gordon	Tackle	Toledo
253	Detroit Lions	Bob Tata	Back	Virginia

=== Round 22 ===
Pick #	NFL team	Player	Position	College
254	Baltimore Colts	Merlin Gish	Center	Kansas
255	Chicago Cardinals	Hal Lokovsek	Tackle	Washington State
256	Washington Redskins	Ed Pucci	Guard	USC
257	Chicago Bears	Wayne Wood	Tackle	Memphis State
258	Pittsburgh Steelers	Ed O'Connor	Tackle	Maryland
259	Green Bay Packers	Bill Turnbeaugh	Tackle	Auburn
260	New York Giants	Mike Kelley	End	Florida
261	Philadelphia Eagles	Laurie LeClaire	Back	Michigan
262	San Francisco 49ers	Laverne Robbins	Guard	Midwestern State (TX)
263	Cleveland Browns	Byrd Looper	Back	Duke
264	Los Angeles Rams	George Porter	Tackle	Southwest Texas State
265	Detroit Lions	Pete Retzlaff	Tight end	South Dakota State

=== Round 23 ===
Pick #	NFL team	Player	Position	College
266	Baltimore Colts	Mike Houseplan	Guard	Tulane
267	Washington Redskins	Ed Bierne	End	Detroit
268	Chicago Cardinals	Jim Root	Back	Miami (OH)
269	Pittsburgh Steelers	Ray Correll	Guard	Kentucky
270	Chicago Bears	Jim Mask	End	Mississippi
271	Green Bay Packers	Bill Murray	End	American International
272	Philadelphia Eagles	Jeff Knox	End	Georgia Tech
273	San Francisco 49ers	Travis Hunt	Tackle	Alabama
274	New York Giants	Ted Kukowski	Center	Navy/Syracuse
275	Cleveland Browns	Ronnie Kent	Back	Tulane
276	Los Angeles Rams	Larry Willoughby	Back	Fresno State
277	Detroit Lions	Carl Karilivacz	Back	Syracuse

=== Round 24 ===
Pick #	NFL team	Player	Position	College
278	Baltimore Colts	Monte Brethauer	End	Oregon
279	Chicago Cardinals	Brad Glass	Guard	Princeton
280	Washington Redskins	Stan Butterworth	Back	Bucknell
281	Chicago Bears	Paul Hatcher	Center	Arkansas City J.C.
282	Pittsburgh Steelers	Bob Schneidenbach	Back	Miami (FL)
283	Green Bay Packers	Jim Haslam	Tackle	Tennessee
284	San Francisco 49ers	Ed Morgan	Back	Tennessee
285	New York Giants	Charley Kubes	Guard	Minnesota
286	Philadelphia Eagles	Eli Romero	Back	Wichita State
287	Cleveland Browns	John Labends	Tackle	Wittenberg
288	Los Angeles Rams	Marlow Gudmundson	Back	Valley City State
289	Detroit Lions	Truett Grant	Tackle	Duke

=== Round 25 ===
Pick #	NFL team	Player	Position	College
290	Baltimore Colts	Joe Szombathy	End	Syracuse
291	Washington Redskins	Art Hurd	Guard	Maryland
292	Chicago Cardinals	Haywood Sullivan	Back	Florida
293	Pittsburgh Steelers	Vic Hampel	End	Houston
294	Chicago Bears	Clyde Pickard	Guard	Wake Forest
295	Green Bay Packers	Ike Jones	End	UCLA
296	New York Giants	Dan Drake	Back	Rice
297	Philadelphia Eagles	Johnny Michels	Guard	Tennessee
298	San Francisco 49ers	Ernie Stockert	End	UCLA
299	Cleveland Browns	Jim Ellis	Back	Michigan State
300	Los Angeles Rams	Ed Clemens	Center	Dayton
301	Detroit Lions	Marv Brown	Back	East Texas State

=== Round 26 ===
Pick #	NFL team	Player	Position	College
302	Baltimore Colts	Scott Prescott	Center	Minnesota
303	Chicago Cardinals	Don Ringe	Tackle	Idaho
304	Washington Redskins	Walt Ashcraft	Tackle	USC
305	Chicago Bears	Bob Evans	Tackle	Pennsylvania
306	Pittsburgh Steelers	Jack "Goose" McClairen	End	Bethune-Cookman
307	Green Bay Packers	George Bozanic	Back	USC
308	Philadelphia Eagles	Harvey Achziger	Tackle	Colorado State
309	San Francisco 49ers	Harley Cooper	Back	Arizona State
310	New York Giants	Bill Wetzel	Back	Syracuse
311	Cleveland Browns	Charlie Hoag	Back	Kansas
312	Los Angeles Rams	Louie Yourkowski	Tackle	Washington
313	Detroit Lions	Jim Dooley	Center	Penn State

=== Round 27 ===
Pick #	NFL team	Player	Position	College
314	Baltimore Colts	Ray Graves	Back	Texas A&M
315	Washington Redskins	John Zanetti	Tackle	John Carroll
316	Chicago Cardinals	C. O. Brocato	Center	Baylor
317	Pittsburgh Steelers	Jack Delaney	Back	Cincinnati
318	Chicago Bears	Marvin Wahlin	Back	Arizona State
319	Green Bay Packers	Jim McConaughey	End	Houston
320	San Francisco 49ers	Ralph McLeod	End	Louisiana State
321	New York Giants	Roosevelt "Rosey" Brown	Offensive tackle	Morgan State
322	Philadelphia Eagles	Earl Hersh	Back	West Chester
323	Cleveland Browns	Jack Sisco	Center	Baylor
324	Los Angeles Rams	Lou Welsh	Center	USC
325	Detroit Lions	Jackie Parker	Back	Mississippi State

=== Round 28 ===
Pick #	NFL team	Player	Position	College
326	Baltimore Colts	Joe Sabol	Back	UCLA
327	Chicago Cardinals	Mike Prokopiak	Back	New Mexico
328	Washington Redskins	Bob Buckley	Back	USC
329	Chicago Bears	Jim Caldwell	Tackle	Tennessee State
330	Pittsburgh Steelers	Joe Cimini	Tackle	Mississippi State
331	Green Bay Packers	Zack Jordan	Back	Colorado
332	New York Giants	Joe Ramona	Guard	Santa Clara
333	Philadelphia Eagles	Joe Gratson	Back	Penn State
334	San Francisco 49ers	Tom Novikoff	Back	Oregon
335	Cleveland Browns	Ray Verkirk	Tackle	North Texas State
336	Los Angeles Rams	Jim Murray	Tackle	Montana
337	Detroit Lions	Laurin Pepper	Back	Southern Mississippi

=== Round 29 ===
Pick #	NFL team	Player	Position	College
338	Baltimore Colts	Jack Alessandrini	Guard	Notre Dame
339	Washington Redskins	Pat Shires	Back	Tennessee
340	Chicago Cardinals	Earl Wrightenberry	Tackle	Clemson
341	Pittsburgh Steelers	Art Massaro	Back	Washington & Jefferson
342	Chicago Bears	Jack Lewis	End	Wake Forest
343	Green Bay Packers	Henry O'Brien	Guard	Boston College
344	Philadelphia Eagles	Ralph Paolone	Back	Kentucky
345	San Francisco 49ers	Don Stillwell	End	USC
346	New York Giants	Bob Griffis	Guard	Furman
347	Cleveland Browns	Clell Hobson	Back	Alabama
348	Los Angeles Rams	Ray Lewis	End	Boise J.C.
349	Detroit Lions	Harley Rector	Tackle	Wayne State (NE)

=== Round 30 ===
Pick #	NFL team	Player	Position	College
350	Baltimore Colts	Tom Roche	Tackle	Northwestern
351	Chicago Cardinals	Bill Gaudreau	Back	Notre Dame
352	Washington Redskins	Bob Mathias	Back	Stanford
353	Chicago Bears	Bill Brehany	Quarterback	Virginia Military Inst
354	Pittsburgh Steelers	Lou Tepe	Center	Duke
355	Green Bay Packers	Al Barry	Guard	USC
356	New York Giants	Stavros Canakes	Guard	Minnesota
357	Philadelphia Eagles	Chuck Hren	Back	Northwestern
358	Cleveland Browns	Andy Myers	Guard	Tennessee
359	Los Angeles Rams	Fritz Phren	Back	College of the Ozarks
360	Detroit Lions	Hal Maus	End	Montana

= Pro Bowler	= Hall of Famer

== Hall of Famers ==
- Joe Schmidt, linebacker from the University of Pittsburgh taken 7th round 85th overall by the Detroit Lions.

Inducted: Professional Football Hall of Fame class of 1973.

- Roosevelt Brown, offensive tackle from Morgan State University taken 27th round 321st overall by the New York Giants.

Inducted: Professional Football Hall of Fame class of 1975.

- Jim Ringo, center from Syracuse University taken 7th round 79th overall by the Green Bay Packers.

Inducted: Professional Football Hall of Fame class of 1981.

- Doug Atkins, tackle from Tennessee taken 1st round 11th overall by the Cleveland Browns.

Inducted: Professional Football Hall of Fame class of 1982.

- John Henry Johnson, fullback from Arizona State University taken 2nd round 18th overall by the Pittsburgh Steelers.

Inducted: Professional Football Hall of Fame class of 1987.

- Bob St. Clair, offensive tackle from the University of San Francisco taken 3rd round 32nd overall by the San Francisco 49ers.

Inducted: Professional Football Hall of Fame class of 1990.

- Stan Jones, guard and defensive tackle from Maryland taken 5th round 54th overall by the Chicago Bears.

Inducted: Professional Football Hall of Fame class of 1991.

- Chuck Noll, guard from the University of Dayton taken 20th round 239th overall by the Cleveland Browns.

Inducted: Professional Football Hall of Fame class of 1993 as a coach.

== Notable undrafted players ==
^{†}	= Pro Bowler

Original NFL team	Player	Pos.	College	Notes
Baltimore Colts	Bill Pellington	LB	Rutgers	
Los Angeles Rams	Don Burroughs	S	Colorado State	
Los Angeles Rams	Eugene Lipscomb ^{†}	DT		
Philadelphia Eagles	Hal Giancanelli	RB	Loyola Marymount	
Pittsburgh Steelers	Leo Elter ^{†}	RB	Villanova	
Pittsburgh Steelers	Willie Thrower	QB	Michigan State	
