= 1952 William & Mary Indians football team =

American college football season

1952 William & Mary Indians football
- Conference: Southern Conference
- Record: 4–5 (4–1 SoCon)
- Head coach: Jack Freeman (1st season)
- Captains: Ed Miodusewski; John Flanagan
- Home stadium: Cary Field

1952 Southern Conference football standings
	Conf.					Overall
Team	W		L		T	W		L		T
No. 16 Duke $	5	–	0	–	0	8	–	2	–	0
Wake Forest	5	–	1	–	0	5	–	4	–	1
West Virginia	5	–	1	–	0	7	–	2	–	0
William & Mary	4	–	1	–	0	4	–	5	–	0
George Washington	4	–	2	–	1	5	–	3	–	1
VPI	4	–	4	–	0	5	–	6	–	0
Furman	2	–	2	–	1	6	–	3	–	1
Washington and Lee	3	–	4	–	0	3	–	7	–	0
VMI	2	–	3	–	1	3	–	6	–	1
NC State	2	–	4	–	0	3	–	7	–	0
South Carolina	2	–	4	–	0	5	–	5	–	0
North Carolina	1	–	2	–	0	2	–	6	–	0
The Citadel	1	–	3	–	1	3	–	5	–	1
Davidson	1	–	6	–	0	2	–	7	–	0
Richmond	0	–	6	–	0	1	–	9	–	0
Maryland †			–			7	–	2	–	0
Clemson †			–			2	–	6	–	1
$ – Conference champion; † League sanctions prevented Maryland and Clemson from conference participation; Rankings from AP Poll

The 1952 William & Mary Indians football team represented the College of William & Mary as a member of the Southern Conference (SoCon) during the 1952 college football season. Led by first-year head coach Jack Freeman the Indians compiled an overall record of 4–5 with a mark of 4–1 in conference play, and finished fourth in the SoCon. William & Mary played home games at Cary Field in Williamsburg, Virginia.

== Schedule ==
Date	Opponent	Site	Result	Attendance	Source
September 20	vs. VMI	Victory Stadium; Roanoke, VA (rivalry)	W 34–13	12,000	
September 27	Wake Forest	Cary Field; Williamsburg, VA	L 21–28	13,000	
October 4	at Penn State*	New Beaver Field; University Park, PA	L 23–35	22,848	
October 11	at No. 17 Navy*	Thompson Stadium; Annapolis, MD	L 0–14	19,000	
October 18	at Boston University*	Fenway Park; Boston, MA	L 28–33	15,855	
October 24	Richmond^{†}	Cary Field; Williamsburg, VA (rivalry)	W 42–13		
November 8	at VPI	Miles Stadium; Blacksburg, VA	W 35–15	6,000	
November 22	NC State	Cary Field; Williamsburg, VA	W 41–6	3,000	
November 29	Virginia*	Cary Field; Williamsburg, VA	L 13–20	15,000	
*Non-conference game; ^{†}Homecoming; Rankings from AP Poll released prior to the game

== NFL draft selections ==
Year	Round	Pick	Overall	Name	Team	Position
1953	8	4	89	John Kreamcheck	Chicago Bears	Tackle
1953	18	12	217	Ed Mioduszewski	Detroit Lions	Back
