= Matesic =

Matesic is a surname. Notable people with the surname include:

- Ed Matesic (1907–1988), American football player
- Joe Matesic (1929–2020), American football player
