= Paul Dekker =

American football player (born 1998)

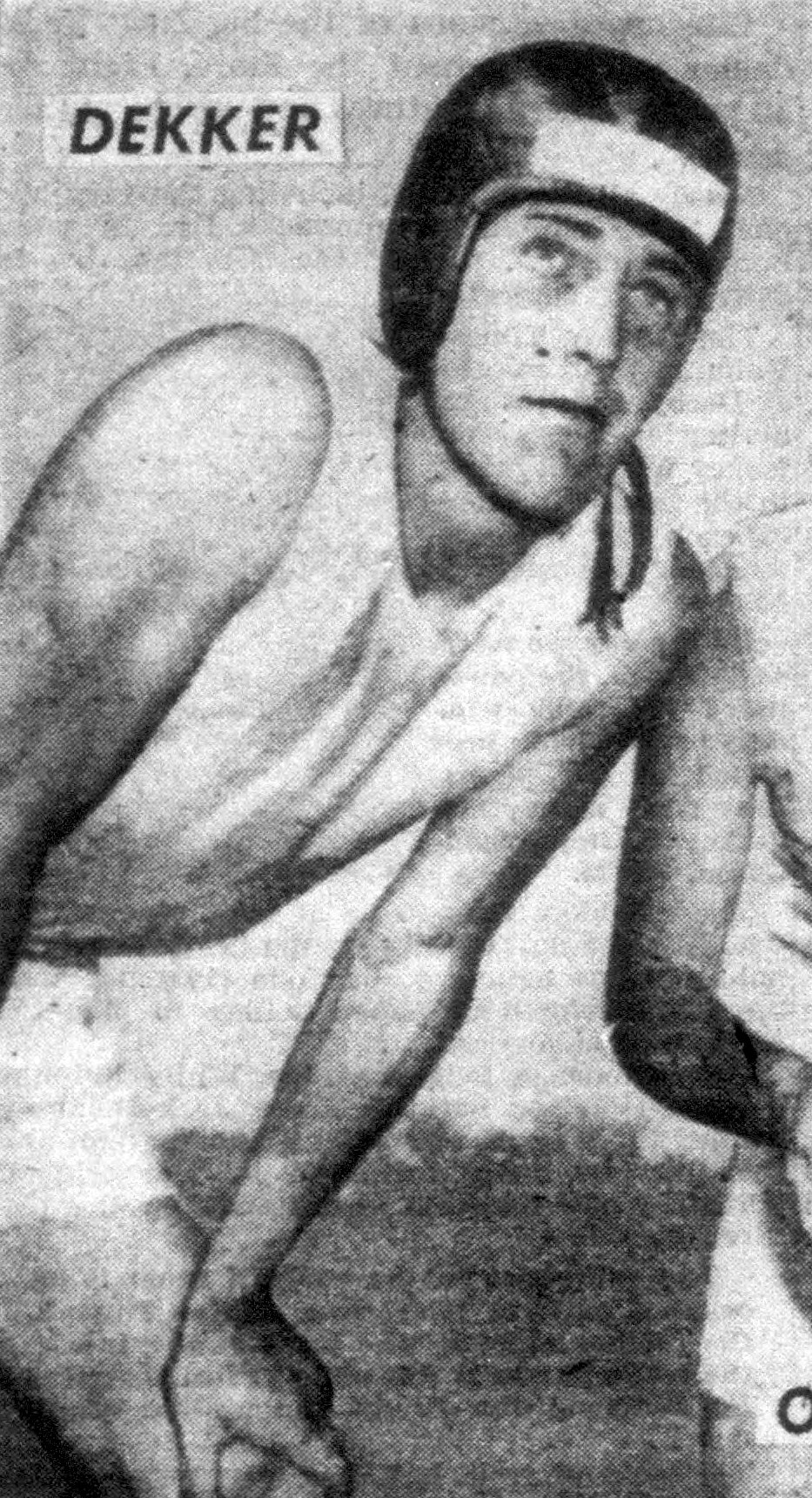
- Dekker in 1953

No. 83, 75
- Position: End

Personal information
- Born: February 24, 1931; Muskegon, Michigan, U.S.
- Died: May 8, 2001 (aged 70); Burlington, Ontario, Canada
- Listed height: 6 ft 5 in (1.96 m)
- Listed weight: 220 lb (100 kg)

Career information
- High school: Muskegon
- College: Michigan State (1949–1952)
- NFL draft: 1953: 3rd round, 27th overall pick

Career history
- Washington Redskins (1953, 1956); Hamilton Tiger-Cats (1956–1962)

Awards and highlights
- Grey Cup champion (1957); 4× CFL East All-Star (1958–1961); National champion (1952)

Career NFL statistics
- Receptions: 14
- Receiving yards: 182
- Touchdowns: 1
- Stats at Pro Football Reference

Paul Nelson Dekker (February 24, 1931 – May 8, 2001) was an American professional football end who played for the Hamilton Tiger-Cats of the Canadian Football League (CFL) and the Washington Redskins of the National Football League (NFL). He was selected by the Redskins in the third round of the 1953 NFL draft after playing college football for the Michigan State Spartans.

== Early life ==
Paul Nelson Dekker was born on February 24, 1931, in Muskegon, Michigan. He played high school football at Muskegon High School as an end and earned all-state honors twice. He was inducted into the Muskegon Area Sports Hall of Fame in 1990.

== College career ==
Dekker was a member of the Michigan State Spartans of Michigan State College from 1949 to 1952. He was a two-year starter and letterman from 1951 to 1952. He was part of the Michigan State team that won the school's first football national championship in 1952, after finishing the season with a 9–0 record. Dekker was also named to the Associated Press's All-Western team in 1952 and caught 13 passes for 171 yards and one touchdown that season. After his senior year, he played in the East–West Shrine game, the Chicago Charities College All-Star Game, and the Hula Bowl.

== Professional career ==
Dekker was selected by the Washington Redskins of the National Football League (NFL) in the third round, with the 27th overall pick, of the 1953 NFL draft. He played in 11 games, starting eight, during his rookie year in 1953, catching 14 passes for 182 yards and one touchdown. He became a free agent on May 1, 1954. Dekker re-signed with the team in 1956 but was later released on September 21, 1956.

Dekker played in 90 games for the Hamilton Tiger-Cats of the Canadian Football League (CFL) from 1956 to 1962, recording 234 receptions for 3,718 yards and 27 touchdowns. He was part of the Tiger-Cats team that won the 45th Grey Cup against the Winnipeg Blue Bombers on November 30, 1957. He was a CFL East All-Star four times from 1958 to 1961.

== Personal life ==
Dekker died on May 8, 2001, in Burlington, Ontario, Canada.
