= John Kreamcheck =

American football player (1926–2014)

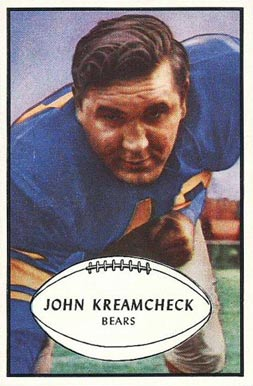
- Kreamcheck on a 1953 Bowman football card

No. 58
- Position: Defensive tackle

Personal information
- Born: January 7, 1926; Vestaburg, Pennsylvania, U.S.
- Died: January 28, 2014 (aged 88); McHenry, Illinois, U.S.
- Listed height: 6 ft 5 in (1.96 m)
- Listed weight: 255 lb (116 kg)

Career information
- College: William & Mary
- NFL draft: 1953: 8th round, 89th overall pick

Career history
- Chicago Bears (1953–1955)

Awards and highlights
- 2× All-American

Career NFL statistics
- Fumble recoveries: 3
- Stats at Pro Football Reference

John D. Kreamcheck (January 7, 1926 – January 28, 2014) was an American professional football player who was a defensive tackle for three seasons with the Chicago Bears of the National Football League (NFL) between 1953 and 1955. Kreamcheck played college football for the William & Mary Tribe.
