= 1952 Davidson Wildcats football team =

American college football season

1952 Davidson Wildcats football
- Conference: Southern Conference
- Record: 2–7 (1–6 SoCon)
- Head coach: Bill Dole (1st season)
- Home stadium: Richardson Stadium

1952 Southern Conference football standings
	Conf.					Overall
Team	W		L		T	W		L		T
No. 16 Duke $	5	–	0	–	0	8	–	2	–	0
Wake Forest	5	–	1	–	0	5	–	4	–	1
West Virginia	5	–	1	–	0	7	–	2	–	0
William & Mary	4	–	1	–	0	4	–	5	–	0
George Washington	4	–	2	–	1	5	–	3	–	1
VPI	4	–	4	–	0	5	–	6	–	0
Furman	2	–	2	–	1	6	–	3	–	1
Washington and Lee	3	–	4	–	0	3	–	7	–	0
VMI	2	–	3	–	1	3	–	6	–	1
NC State	2	–	4	–	0	3	–	7	–	0
South Carolina	2	–	4	–	0	5	–	5	–	0
North Carolina	1	–	2	–	0	2	–	6	–	0
The Citadel	1	–	3	–	1	3	–	5	–	1
Davidson	1	–	6	–	0	2	–	7	–	0
Richmond	0	–	6	–	0	1	–	9	–	0
Maryland †			–			7	–	2	–	0
Clemson †			–			2	–	6	–	1
$ – Conference champion; † League sanctions prevented Maryland and Clemson from conference participation; Rankings from AP Poll

The 1952 Davidson Wildcats football team was an American football team that represented Davidson College during the 1952 college football season as a member of the Southern Conference. In their first year under head coach Bill Dole, the team compiled an overall record of 2–7, with a mark of 1–6 in conference play, and finished in 14th place in the SoCon.

== Schedule ==
Date	Opponent	Site	Result	Attendance	Source
September 20	VPI	Richardson Stadium; Davidson, NC	L 14–27		
September 27	Washington and Lee	Richardson Stadium; Davidson, NC	L 14–33		
October 11	at NC State	Riddick Stadium; Raleigh, NC	L 6–28	5,500	
October 17	at Presbyterian*	Bailey Stadium; Clinton, SC	W 13–12	3,500	
October 25	Furman^{†}	Richardson Stadium; Davidson, NC	L 13–14	7,500	
November 1	at Harvard*	Harvard Stadium; Boston, MA	L 26–35	6,500	
November 8	Richmond	Richardson Stadium; Davidson, NC	W 38–19		
November 14	at George Washington	Griffith Stadium; Washington, DC	L 13–40		
November 22	at The Citadel	Johnson Hagood Stadium; Charleston, SC	L 14–34	3,500	
*Non-conference game; ^{†}Homecoming
