= 1952 Furman Purple Hurricane football team =

American college football season

1952 Furman Purple Hurricane football
- Conference: Southern Conference
- Record: 6–3–1 (2–2–1 SoCon)
- Head coach: Bill Young (3rd season)
- Captain: Frank Donaldson
- Home stadium: Sirrine Stadium

1952 Southern Conference football standings
	Conf.					Overall
Team	W		L		T	W		L		T
No. 16 Duke $	5	–	0	–	0	8	–	2	–	0
Wake Forest	5	–	1	–	0	5	–	4	–	1
West Virginia	5	–	1	–	0	7	–	2	–	0
William & Mary	4	–	1	–	0	4	–	5	–	0
George Washington	4	–	2	–	1	5	–	3	–	1
VPI	4	–	4	–	0	5	–	6	–	0
Furman	2	–	2	–	1	6	–	3	–	1
Washington and Lee	3	–	4	–	0	3	–	7	–	0
VMI	2	–	3	–	1	3	–	6	–	1
NC State	2	–	4	–	0	3	–	7	–	0
South Carolina	2	–	4	–	0	5	–	5	–	0
North Carolina	1	–	2	–	0	2	–	6	–	0
The Citadel	1	–	3	–	1	3	–	5	–	1
Davidson	1	–	6	–	0	2	–	7	–	0
Richmond	0	–	6	–	0	1	–	9	–	0
Maryland †			–			7	–	2	–	0
Clemson †			–			2	–	6	–	1
$ – Conference champion; † League sanctions prevented Maryland and Clemson from conference participation; Rankings from AP Poll

The 1952 Furman Purple Hurricane football team was an American football team that represented Furman University as a member of the Southern Conference (SoCon) during the 1952 college football season. Led by third-year head coach Bill Young, the Purple Hurricane compiled an overall record of 6–3–1 with a mark of 2–2–1 in conference play, placing seventh in the SoCon.

== Schedule ==
Date	Opponent	Site	Result	Attendance	Source
September 19	Newberry*	Sirrine Stadium; Greenville, SC	W 47–6		
September 27	at West Virginia	Mountaineer Field; Morgantown, WV	W 22–14	15,000	
October 4	South Carolina	Sirrine Stadium; Greenville, SC	L 7–27	15,000	
October 11	at Stetson*	Hulley Field; DeLand, FL	L 14–25		
October 17	vs. The Citadel	County Fairgrounds; Orangeburg, SC (rivalry)	T 7–7	8,000	
October 25	at Davidson	Richardson Stadium; Davidson, NC	W 14–13	7,500	
November 1	Wofford*	Sirrine Stadium; Greenville, SC (rivalry)	W 29–21		
November 8	Presbyterian*	Sirrine Stadium; Greenville, SC	W 27–6	4,500	
November 15	at Florida State*	Doak Campbell Stadium; Tallahassee, FL	W 9–0	8,096	
November 22	Wake Forest	Sirrine Stadium; Greenville, SC	L 0–28	10,000	
*Non-conference game
