= 1952 VMI Keydets football team =

American college football season

1952 VMI Keydets football
- Conference: Southern Conference
- Record: 3–6–1 (2–3–1 SoCon)
- Head coach: Tom Nugent (4th season)
- Home stadium: Wilson Field

1952 Southern Conference football standings
	Conf.					Overall
Team	W		L		T	W		L		T
No. 16 Duke $	5	–	0	–	0	8	–	2	–	0
Wake Forest	5	–	1	–	0	5	–	4	–	1
West Virginia	5	–	1	–	0	7	–	2	–	0
William & Mary	4	–	1	–	0	4	–	5	–	0
George Washington	4	–	2	–	1	5	–	3	–	1
VPI	4	–	4	–	0	5	–	6	–	0
Furman	2	–	2	–	1	6	–	3	–	1
Washington and Lee	3	–	4	–	0	3	–	7	–	0
VMI	2	–	3	–	1	3	–	6	–	1
NC State	2	–	4	–	0	3	–	7	–	0
South Carolina	2	–	4	–	0	5	–	5	–	0
North Carolina	1	–	2	–	0	2	–	6	–	0
The Citadel	1	–	3	–	1	3	–	5	–	1
Davidson	1	–	6	–	0	2	–	7	–	0
Richmond	0	–	6	–	0	1	–	9	–	0
Maryland †			–			7	–	2	–	0
Clemson †			–			2	–	6	–	1
$ – Conference champion; † League sanctions prevented Maryland and Clemson from conference participation; Rankings from AP Poll

The 1952 VMI Keydets football team was an American football team that represented the Virginia Military Institute (VMI) during the 1952 college football season as a member of the Southern Conference. In their fourth year under head coach Tom Nugent, the team compiled an overall record of 3–6–1.

== Schedule ==
Date	Opponent	Site	Result	Attendance	Source
September 20	vs. William & Mary	Victory Stadium; Roanoke, VA (rivalry)	L 13–34	12,000	
September 26	at Miami (FL)*	Burdine Stadium; Miami, FL	L 0–45	35,542	
October 4	Richmond	Wilson Field; Lexington, VA (rivalry)	W 28–14	4,000	
October 10	at Florida State*	Doak Campbell Stadium; Tallahassee, FL	W 28–7	6,227	
October 18	vs. No. 11 Virginia*	City Stadium; Richmond, VA (Tobacco Bowl)	L 14–33	23,000	
October 24	at George Washington	Griffith Stadium; Washington, DC	T 20–20	12,000	
November 1	at Army*	Michie Stadium; West Point, NY	L 14–42		
November 8	vs. West Virginia	Victory Stadium; Roanoke, VA	L 21–39		
November 15	The Citadel	Wilson Field; Lexington, VA (rivalry)	W 20–19		
November 27	vs. VPI	Victory Stadium; Roanoke, VA (rivalry)	L 7–26	25,000	
*Non-conference game; Rankings from AP Poll released prior to the game
