= 1952 South Carolina Gamecocks football team =

American college football season

1952 South Carolina Gamecocks football
- Conference: Southern Conference
- Record: 5–5 (2–4 SoCon)
- Head coach: Rex Enright (12th season)
- Captains: John Latorre; Walt Shea
- Home stadium: Carolina Stadium

1952 Southern Conference football standings
	Conf.					Overall
Team	W		L		T	W		L		T
No. 16 Duke $	5	–	0	–	0	8	–	2	–	0
Wake Forest	5	–	1	–	0	5	–	4	–	1
West Virginia	5	–	1	–	0	7	–	2	–	0
William & Mary	4	–	1	–	0	4	–	5	–	0
George Washington	4	–	2	–	1	5	–	3	–	1
VPI	4	–	4	–	0	5	–	6	–	0
Furman	2	–	2	–	1	6	–	3	–	1
Washington and Lee	3	–	4	–	0	3	–	7	–	0
VMI	2	–	3	–	1	3	–	6	–	1
NC State	2	–	4	–	0	3	–	7	–	0
South Carolina	2	–	4	–	0	5	–	5	–	0
North Carolina	1	–	2	–	0	2	–	6	–	0
The Citadel	1	–	3	–	1	3	–	5	–	1
Davidson	1	–	6	–	0	2	–	7	–	0
Richmond	0	–	6	–	0	1	–	9	–	0
Maryland †			–			7	–	2	–	0
Clemson †			–			2	–	6	–	1
$ – Conference champion; † League sanctions prevented Maryland and Clemson from conference participation; Rankings from AP Poll

The 1952 South Carolina Gamecocks football team was an American football team that represented the University of South Carolina as a member of the Southern Conference (SoCon) during the 1952 college football season. In their 12th season under head coach Rex Enright, the Gamecocks compiled an overall record of 5–5 with a mark of 2–4– in conference play, tying for tenth place in the SoCon.

== Schedule ==
Date	Time	Opponent	Site	Result	Attendance	Source
September 20		Wofford*	Carolina Stadium; Columbia, SC	W 33–0		
September 27		at Army*	Michie Stadium; West Point, NY	L 7–28	23,474	
October 4		at Furman	Sirrine Stadium; Greenville, SC	W 27–7	15,000	
October 11		No. 6 Duke	Carolina Stadium; Columbia, SC	L 7–33	22,000–24,000	
October 23		Clemson	Carolina Stadium; Columbia, SC (rivalry)	W 6–0	35,000	
November 1		vs. Virginia*	Foreman Field; Norfolk, VA (Oyster Bowl)	W 21–14	21,000	
November 8		at The Citadel	Johnson Hagood Stadium; Charleston, SC	W 35–0	13,000	
November 15		North Carolina	Carolina Stadium; Columbia, SC (rivalry)	L 19–27	20,000	
November 22		West Virginia	Carolina Stadium; Columbia, SC	L 6–13		
November 29	2:00 p.m.	vs. Wake Forest	Bowman Gray Stadium; Winston-Salem, NC	L 14–39	6,000	
*Non-conference game; Rankings from AP Poll released prior to the game; All times are in Eastern time
