= Hal Giancanelli =

American football player (born 1929)

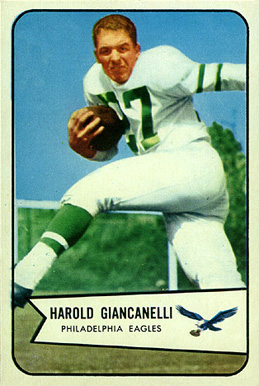
- Giancanelli on a 1954 Bowman football card

No. 27, 87
- Position: Halfback

Personal information
- Born: May 21, 1929; Greeley, Colorado, U.S.
- Died: 2024 (aged 95)
- Listed height: 5 ft 10 in (1.78 m)
- Listed weight: 182 lb (83 kg)

Career information
- High school: Abraham Lincoln (Los Angeles, California)
- College: Loyola (CA)
- NFL draft: 1953: undrafted

Career history
- Philadelphia Eagles (1953–1956); Hamilton Tiger-Cats (1958)

Career NFL statistics
- Rushing yards: 711
- Rushing average: 3.3
- Receptions: 69
- Receiving yards: 1,024
- Total touchdowns: 14
- Stats at Pro Football Reference

Harold Arthur Giancanelli (May 21, 1929 – 2024) was an American professional football player who was a Halfback for four seasons with the Philadelphia Eagles of the National Football League (NFL). He played college football for the Loyola Lions.

Prior to his NFL career, Giancanelli served in the Navy during the Korean War. After his NFL career, and a brief stop in the Canadian Football League (CFL) where he won the 1958 Grey Cup with the Hamilton Tiger Cats, Giancanelli returned to his alma mater and served as the head football coach at Lincoln High School. From there he became the head football coach at El Camino Real High School just prior to that school's opening in 1969. He died in 2024, at the age of 95.
