= 1952 The Citadel Bulldogs football team =

American college football season

1952 The Citadel Bulldogs football
- Conference: Southern Conference
- Record: 3–5–1 (1–3–1 SoCon)
- Head coach: J. Quinn Decker (7th season)
- Home stadium: Johnson Hagood Stadium

1952 Southern Conference football standings
	Conf.					Overall
Team	W		L		T	W		L		T
No. 16 Duke $	5	–	0	–	0	8	–	2	–	0
Wake Forest	5	–	1	–	0	5	–	4	–	1
West Virginia	5	–	1	–	0	7	–	2	–	0
William & Mary	4	–	1	–	0	4	–	5	–	0
George Washington	4	–	2	–	1	5	–	3	–	1
VPI	4	–	4	–	0	5	–	6	–	0
Furman	2	–	2	–	1	6	–	3	–	1
Washington and Lee	3	–	4	–	0	3	–	7	–	0
VMI	2	–	3	–	1	3	–	6	–	1
NC State	2	–	4	–	0	3	–	7	–	0
South Carolina	2	–	4	–	0	5	–	5	–	0
North Carolina	1	–	2	–	0	2	–	6	–	0
The Citadel	1	–	3	–	1	3	–	5	–	1
Davidson	1	–	6	–	0	2	–	7	–	0
Richmond	0	–	6	–	0	1	–	9	–	0
Maryland †			–			7	–	2	–	0
Clemson †			–			2	–	6	–	1
$ – Conference champion; † League sanctions prevented Maryland and Clemson from conference participation; Rankings from AP Poll

The 1952 The Citadel Bulldogs football team represented The Citadel, The Military College of South Carolina in the 1952 college football season. J. Quinn Decker served as head coach for the seventh season. The Bulldogs played as members of the Southern Conference and played home games at Johnson Hagood Stadium.

== Schedule ==
Date	Opponent	Site	Result	Attendance	Source
September 20	at No. 3 Georgia Tech*	Grant Field; Atlanta, GA	L 6–54	22,000	
September 27	VPI*	Johnson Hagood Stadium; Charleston, SC	L 7–14	8,000	
October 4	vs. Florida*	Gator Bowl Stadium; Jacksonville, FL	L 0–33	21,000	
October 11	Newberry*	Johnson Hagood Stadium; Charleston, SC	W 18–7		
October 17	vs. Furman	County Fairgrounds; Orangeburg, SC (rivalry)	T 7–7	8,000	
October 25	Presbyterian*	Johnson Hagood Stadium; Charleston, SC	W 28–7	6,000	
November 8	South Carolina^{†}	Johnson Hagood Stadium; Charleston, SC	L 0–35	13,000	
November 15	at VMI	Wilson Field; Lexington, VA (rivalry)	L 19–20		
November 22	Davidson	Johnson Hagood Stadium; Charleston, SC	W 34–14	3,500	
*Non-conference game; ^{†}Homecoming; Rankings from AP Poll released prior to the game
