= 1952 Richmond Spiders football team =

American college football season

1952 Richmond Spiders football
- Conference: Southern Conference
- Record: 1–9 (0–6 SoCon)
- Head coach: Ed Merrick (2nd season)
- Captain: Al Pecuch
- Home stadium: City Stadium

1952 Southern Conference football standings
	Conf.					Overall
Team	W		L		T	W		L		T
No. 16 Duke $	5	–	0	–	0	8	–	2	–	0
Wake Forest	5	–	1	–	0	5	–	4	–	1
West Virginia	5	–	1	–	0	7	–	2	–	0
William & Mary	4	–	1	–	0	4	–	5	–	0
George Washington	4	–	2	–	1	5	–	3	–	1
VPI	4	–	4	–	0	5	–	6	–	0
Furman	2	–	2	–	1	6	–	3	–	1
Washington and Lee	3	–	4	–	0	3	–	7	–	0
VMI	2	–	3	–	1	3	–	6	–	1
NC State	2	–	4	–	0	3	–	7	–	0
South Carolina	2	–	4	–	0	5	–	5	–	0
North Carolina	1	–	2	–	0	2	–	6	–	0
The Citadel	1	–	3	–	1	3	–	5	–	1
Davidson	1	–	6	–	0	2	–	7	–	0
Richmond	0	–	6	–	0	1	–	9	–	0
Maryland †			–			7	–	2	–	0
Clemson †			–			2	–	6	–	1
$ – Conference champion; † League sanctions prevented Maryland and Clemson from conference participation; Rankings from AP Poll

The 1952 Richmond Spiders football team was an American football team that represented the University of Richmond as a member of the Southern Conference (SoCon) during the 1952 college football season. In their second season under head coach Ed Merrick, Richmond compiled a 1–9 record, with a mark of 0–6 in conference play, finishing tied for 15th place in the SoCon.

== Schedule ==
Date	Opponent	Site	Result	Attendance	Source
September 20	Randolph–Macon*	City Stadium; Richmond, VA	W 34–19	7,000	
September 26	at Boston College*	Braves Field; Boston, MA	L 7–14	13,413	
October 4	at VMI	Wilson Field; Lexington, VA (rivalry)	L 14–28	4,000	
October 11	Washington and Lee	City Stadium; Richmond, VA	L 20–21	5,000	
October 17	at Miami (FL)*	Burdine Stadium; Miami, FL	L 6–41	24,255	
October 25	at William & Mary	Cary Field; Williamsburg, VA (rivalry)	L 13–42		
November 1	VPI	City Stadium; Richmond, VA	L 2–20	7,000	
November 8	at Davidson	Richardson Stadium; Davidson, NC	L 19–38		
November 15	at Virginia*	Scott Stadium; Charlottesville, VA	L 0–49	6,000	
November 22	George Washington	City Stadium; Richmond, VA	L 7–29	3,000	
*Non-conference game
