= Royal Bailey =

American gridiron football player (1929–2006)

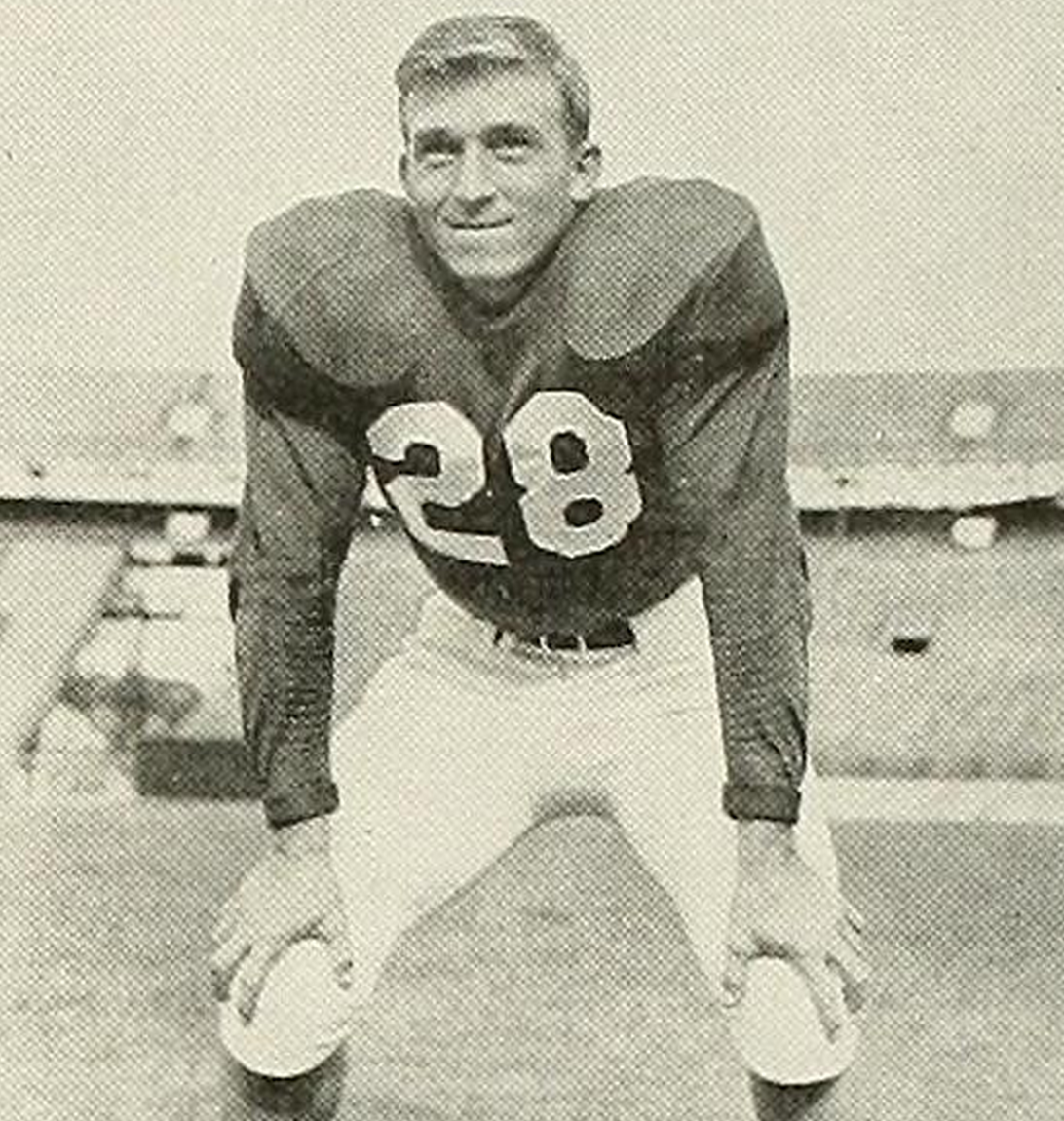
- Bailey pictured in Jambalaya 1953, Tulane yearbook

Profile
- Position: Halfback

Personal information
- Born: September 23, 1929; Richmond, Virginia, U.S.
- Died: June 12, 2006 (aged 76); Bentonville, Arkansas, U.S.
- Listed height: 5 ft 8 in (1.73 m)
- Listed weight: 205 lb (93 kg)

Career information
- High school: Benedictine Prep (Goochland, Virginia)
- College: Tulane
- NFL draft: 1953: 14th round, 165th overall pick

Career history

Playing
- 1953: Hamilton Tiger Cats
- 1957: Kitchener-Waterloo Dutchmen

Coaching
- 1958: Kitchener-Waterloo Dutchmen

Awards and highlights
- Grey Cup champion (1953)

Early Royall Bailey (September 23, 1929 – June 12, 2006) was an American professional football player who played for the Hamilton Tiger Cats. He won the Grey Cup with them in 1953. He previously played football at Tulane University from 1951 to 1952, earning a letter in the sport. He signed with the Kitchener-Waterloo Dutchmen in 1957 after serving in the United States Air Force for 2 years. In 1958, he was named head coach of the Dutchmen following the departure of Harvey Johnson. He guided the team to the Ontario Rugby Football Union championship game, but lost decisively to the Sarnia Golden Bears. He was replaced for the 1959 season by Bob Jauron.
