= Jim Psaltis =

American football player (1927–2017)

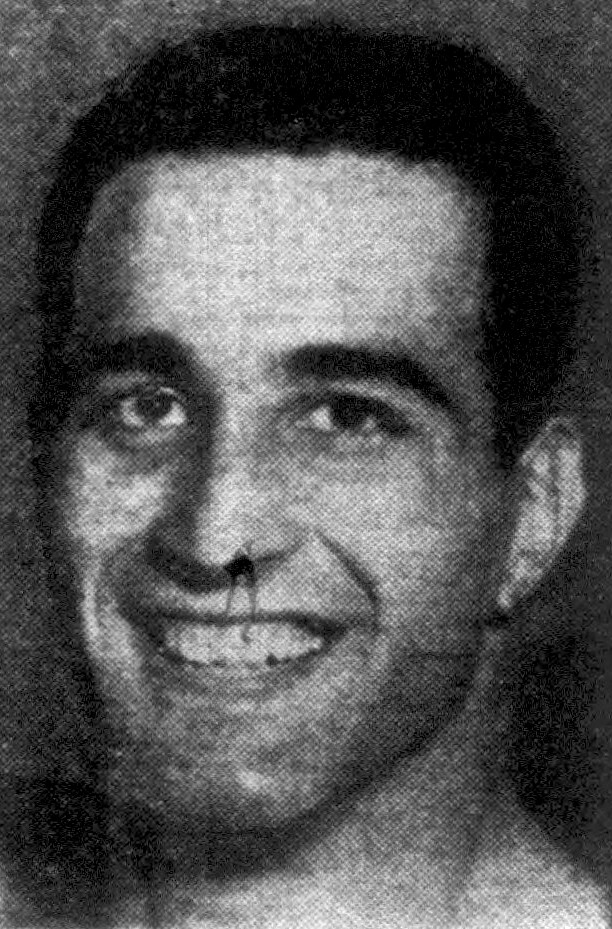
- Psaltis, circa 1953

No. 24, 48, 47
- Position: Defensive back

Personal information
- Born: December 14, 1927; Chicago, Illinois, U.S.
- Died: July 6, 2017 (aged 89); Torrance, California, U.S.
- Listed height: 6 ft 1 in (1.85 m)
- Listed weight: 190 lb (86 kg)

Career information
- High school: Alameda (Alameda, California)
- College: San Jose State; USC
- NFL draft: 1953: 2nd round, 15th overall pick

Career history
- Chicago Cardinals (1953); Green Bay Packers (1954); Chicago Cardinals (1955)

Career NFL statistics
- Interceptions: 6
- Fumble recoveries: 7
- Total touchdowns: 1
- Stats at Pro Football Reference

David James Psaltis (December 14, 1927 – July 6, 2017) was an American professional football defensive back. He played professionally in the National Football League (NFL) for the Chicago Cardinals and the Green Bay Packers. Psaltis died in Torrance, California on July 6, 2017, at the age of 89.

== Early life ==
Psaltis was born in Chicago on December 14, 1927. He attended Alameda High School in Alameda, California, where he played football and track and field. In high school, he won a championship in the shot put and discus in 1946. He played college football at San Jose State University and the University of Southern California (USC). He played for the USC Trojans when they won the 1953 Rose Bowl.

== Professional career ==
Psaltis was drafted in the second round (15th pick overall) of the 1953 NFL draft by the Chicago Cardinals, and played that season with the Cardinals. The following season, he played with the Green Bay Packers before re-joining the Cardinals for the 1955 NFL season.
