= Ralph Jecha =

American football player (1931–2018)

No. 69, 65
- Positions: Guard, linebacker

Personal information
- Born: December 1, 1931; Chicago, Illinois, U.S.
- Died: May 15, 2018 (aged 86); Oak Lawn, Illinois, U.S.
- Listed height: 6 ft 2 in (1.88 m)
- Listed weight: 235 lb (107 kg)

Career information
- High school: Summit (IL) Argo
- College: Northwestern
- NFL draft: 1953: 15th round, 174th overall pick

Career history
- Chicago Bears (1955); Pittsburgh Steelers (1956)

Career NFL statistics
- Games played: 19
- Games started: 8
- Stats at Pro Football Reference

Ralph Jecha (December 1, 1931 – May 15, 2018) was an American professional football guard and linebacker. He played for the Chicago Bears in 1955 and for the Pittsburgh Steelers in 1956.

He died on May 15, 2018, in Oak Lawn, Illinois at age 86.
