= 1952 George Washington Colonials football team =

American college football season

1952 George Washington Colonials football
- Conference: Southern Conference
- Record: 6–2–1 (5–1–1 SoCon)
- Head coach: Bo Sherman (1st season)
- Home stadium: Griffith Stadium

1952 Southern Conference football standings
	Conf.					Overall
Team	W		L		T	W		L		T
No. 16 Duke $	5	–	0	–	0	8	–	2	–	0
Wake Forest	5	–	1	–	0	5	–	4	–	1
West Virginia	5	–	1	–	0	7	–	2	–	0
William & Mary	4	–	1	–	0	4	–	5	–	0
George Washington	4	–	2	–	1	5	–	3	–	1
VPI	4	–	4	–	0	5	–	6	–	0
Furman	2	–	2	–	1	6	–	3	–	1
Washington and Lee	3	–	4	–	0	3	–	7	–	0
VMI	2	–	3	–	1	3	–	6	–	1
NC State	2	–	4	–	0	3	–	7	–	0
South Carolina	2	–	4	–	0	5	–	5	–	0
North Carolina	1	–	2	–	0	2	–	6	–	0
The Citadel	1	–	3	–	1	3	–	5	–	1
Davidson	1	–	6	–	0	2	–	7	–	0
Richmond	0	–	6	–	0	1	–	9	–	0
Maryland †			–			7	–	2	–	0
Clemson †			–			2	–	6	–	1
$ – Conference champion; † League sanctions prevented Maryland and Clemson from conference participation; Rankings from AP Poll

The 1952 George Washington Colonials football team was an American football team that represented George Washington University as a member of the Southern Conference (SoCon) during the 1952 college football season. In its first season under head coach Bo Sherman, the team compiled a 6–2–1 record (5–1–1 in conference games) and outscored its opponents by a total of 188 to 149. It was the school's best win-loss record since 1936.

Sherman was hired as the team's head coach in June 1952. He announced at the time that he change the program's offense from the single-wing formation to a split-T.

== Schedule ==
Date	Opponent	Site	Result	Attendance	Source
September 27	at NC State	Riddick Stadium; Raleigh, NC	W 39–0	7,500	
October 4	Washington and Lee	George Washington HS Stadium; Alexandria, VA	W 33-28	7,500	
October 11	at No. 15 Virginia*	Scott Stadium; Charlottesville, VA	L 0–50	18,000	
October 18	at VPI	Miles Stadium; Blacksburg, VA	W 6–0	11,000	
October 24	VMI	Griffith Stadium; Washington, DC	T 20–20	12,000	
November 1	at West Virginia	Mountaineer Field; Morgantown, WV	L 0–24	20,000	
November 7	Bucknell*	Griffith Stadium; Washington, DC	W 21–7	4,000	
November 14	Davidson	Griffith Stadium; Washington, DC	W 40–13		
November 22	at Richmond	City Stadium; Richmond, VA	W 29–7	3,000	
*Non-conference game; Rankings from AP Poll released prior to the game

== Players ==
- Little Bino Barreira, right halfback, 155 pounds
- Jack Baumgartner, quarterback, senior, completed 9 of 14 passes for 189 yards
- Len Ciemniecki, left halfback, freshman, 185 pounds, Elizabeth, NJ
- Frank Continetti, defensive line
- Norb "Dutch" Danz, fullback
- Jim England, end
- Tom Flyzik, tackle
- Ray Fox, T quarterback
- Don Greene
- Bob Gutt, defensive line
- Cecil Perkins, end
- Skinny Safter, freshman
- George Semkew, defensive line
- Bob Sturm, safety, Muskogee, OK
