= 1952 West Virginia Mountaineers football team =

American college football season

1952 West Virginia Mountaineers football
- Conference: Southern Conference
- Record: 7–2 (5–1 SoCon)
- Head coach: Art Lewis (3rd season)
- Captain: Paul Bischoff
- Home stadium: Mountaineer Field

1952 Southern Conference football standings
	Conf.					Overall
Team	W		L		T	W		L		T
No. 16 Duke $	5	–	0	–	0	8	–	2	–	0
Wake Forest	5	–	1	–	0	5	–	4	–	1
West Virginia	5	–	1	–	0	7	–	2	–	0
William & Mary	4	–	1	–	0	4	–	5	–	0
George Washington	4	–	2	–	1	5	–	3	–	1
VPI	4	–	4	–	0	5	–	6	–	0
Furman	2	–	2	–	1	6	–	3	–	1
Washington and Lee	3	–	4	–	0	3	–	7	–	0
VMI	2	–	3	–	1	3	–	6	–	1
NC State	2	–	4	–	0	3	–	7	–	0
South Carolina	2	–	4	–	0	5	–	5	–	0
North Carolina	1	–	2	–	0	2	–	6	–	0
The Citadel	1	–	3	–	1	3	–	5	–	1
Davidson	1	–	6	–	0	2	–	7	–	0
Richmond	0	–	6	–	0	1	–	9	–	0
Maryland †			–			7	–	2	–	0
Clemson †			–			2	–	6	–	1
$ – Conference champion; † League sanctions prevented Maryland and Clemson from conference participation; Rankings from AP Poll

The 1952 West Virginia Mountaineers football team was an American football team that represented West Virginia University in the Southern Conference (SoCon) during the 1952 college football season. In its third season under head coach Art Lewis, the team compiled a 7–2 record (5–1 against SoCon opponents), finished second in the conference, and outscored opponents by a total of 234 to 116. The team played its home games at Mountaineer Field in Morgantown, West Virginia. Paul Bischoff was the team captain.

== Schedule ==
Date	Opponent	Site	Result	Attendance	Source
September 27	Furman	Mountaineer Field; Morgantown, WV	L 14–22	15,000	
October 4	Waynesburg*	Mountaineer Field; Morgantown, WV	W 49–12	12,500	
October 11	No. 20 Penn State*	Mountaineer Field; Mogantown, WV (rivalry)	L 21–35	18,500	
October 18	vs. Washington and Lee	Fort Hill Stadium; Cumberland, MD	W 31–13	> 5,000	
October 25	at No. 18 Pittsburgh*	Pitt Stadium; Pittsburgh, PA (rivalry)	W 16–0	28,532	
November 1	George Washington^{†}	Mountaineer Field; Morgantown, WV	W 24–0	20,000	
November 8	vs. VMI	Victory Stadium; Roanoke, VA	W 39–21		
November 15	VPI	Mountaineer Field; Morgantown, WV (rivalry)	W 27–7		
November 22	at South Carolina	Carolina Stadium; Columbia, SC	W 13–6		
*Non-conference game; ^{†}Homecoming; Rankings from AP Poll released prior to the game
