= Joe Matesic =

American football player (1929–2020)

No. 74
- Position: Tackle

Personal information
- Born: November 21, 1929; Rankin, Pennsylvania, U.S.
- Died: August 5, 2020 (aged 90); Penn Trafford, Pennsylvania, U.S.
- Listed height: 6 ft 4 in (1.93 m)
- Listed weight: 250 lb (113 kg)

Career information
- College: Indiana (1949–1950); Arizona State (1951)
- NFL draft: 1953: 12th round, 141st overall pick

Career history
- Pittsburgh Steelers (1954)

Career NFL statistics
- Games played: 1
- Stats at Pro Football Reference

Joseph Thomas Matesic (November 21, 1929 – August 5, 2020) was an American football player who played for Pittsburgh Steelers of the National Football League (NFL). He played college football at Indiana University and Arizona State College at Tempe. He enrolled at Arizona State under his brother's name to avoid having to sit out the season; when the story came to light, it prompted the resignation of football coach Larry Siemering, who knew of Matesic's identity.

== College career ==
Born in Rankin, Pennsylvania, Joe played high school football and basketball at Rankin High School, playing as a basketball center and a football lineman. In 1949, he graduated high school and enrolled at Indiana University; as a sophomore in 1950, he did not see game action until Indiana starting lineman Bill Bird was injured. Matesic also handled kickoff duties. Matesic later moved up to the first-string offensive line, and in the final game of the season against Purdue, Matesic was ejected in the second quarter for unnecessary roughness.

Matesic left Indiana University after the fall 1950 semester and was recorded by the university as having formally withdrawn on February 21, 1951, claiming "insufficient funds", though a university spokesman noted that students often gave fake reasons for leaving school. At the time, Matesic was in good standing at Indiana and was still eligible to play. Using the name of his brother Ed and high school credits, Joe Matesic proceeded to enroll at Arizona State College at Tempe (ASC), where he was originally named to the second-string offensive unit under first-year head coach Larry Siemering. Had he enrolled under his own name, he would have had to sit out in 1951, as college rules of the time required transfers to wait a season before they could play. By the time the Sun Devils went to Fayetteville, Arkansas, to play the Razorbacks, Siemering had moved Matesic to the starting offensive line, which was claimed to include four freshmen. At the end of the season, Matesic was named to the All-Border Conference football team by coaches and sportswriters; only one freshman beside Matesic, Ray Howard of Texas Tech, was selected.

== Eligibility scandal ==
On January 12, 1952, the Phoenix Gazette newspaper reported that Matesic had played the 1951 season at Arizona State under his brother's name, which Arizona State College president Grady Gammage confirmed and noted he had already left the institution to return to Rankin, Pennsylvania. The report from The Gazette noted that Matesic had been reluctant to pose for team photos at training camp. Matesic's cover was blown when a former Indiana student, in the military, spotted Matesic's photo in a team program and made the connection. The report touched off a scandal at Arizona State, but Border Conference rules of the time made it possible that no forfeitures could be assessed as the deadline for protests had passed. It prompted ASC to examine its roster for potential eligibility issues. A second Arizona State player, George Schuljak, was found to have played the previous season at Wayne University and failed to disclose his prior college record upon enrollment.

In a notarized statement issued to newspapers for publication, Matesic claimed that Siemering knew of Matesic's situation, as well as other coaches and one player on the team. He stated that when it appeared the story was likely to leak to the press, the college bought a one-way plane ticket so he could join the U.S. Army, having previously had his draft status deferred. The release of the statement prompted Governor J. Howard Pyle to urge the Matesic file be reopened. On March 23, Siemering presented his resignation to the Arizona Board of Regents; despite having previously been recommended for retention in 1952, he cited "unfavorable publicity" stemming from the Matesic case.

That May, Border Conference assessed a one-year probation to Arizona State in the wake of the Matesic case, with conference officials expressing hope that changes in the ASC football staff evinced a change in policy. Though some members of the conference based in Texas wanted to expel ASC from the league over the matter and held a secret meeting in Hobbs, New Mexico, the University of Arizona refused to attend, denying the Texas schools a quorum and keeping Arizona State in the conference. The NCAA assessed a two-year probation to ASC in August 1953, but the probation had more to do with illegal booster activities and less with the Matesic and Schuljak eligibility findings.

Matesic was not the first "ringer" to play for Arizona State. In 1939, Jep Shamblee, who had played for Alabama in 1934, came west to play for Arizona State. The story was kept hidden when a graduate manager, who saw Shamblee's photo in a calendar, bought all the calendars to give to boosters.

== Professional football ==
Despite the scandal, the New York Giants drafted Matesic 141st overall in the 12th round of the 1953 NFL draft. At the time, Matesic was serving in the U.S. Marine Corps and played on the Pearl Harbor Marines team. The team finished second in the University–Armed Forces Football Conference, and Matesic was named to the all-star team that played in the Hula Bowl.

Matesic attended the Giants' 1954 training camp but pulled out with a back injury. Matesic reportedly was underweight for professional football; also at Giants training camp was fellow ASC alum Earl Putman, who weighed 302 pounds (137 kg) to Matesic's 235 pounds (107 kg).

The Pittsburgh Steelers signed Matesic on November 26, 1954. The Steelers needed reinforcements due to injuries among their linemen. He played in the 1954 season and was cut before 1955 training camp.

Matesic worked in the Homestead Steel Works mill until retiring in 1985. He died in Pennsylvania on August 5, 2020, at the age of 90.
