= 1952 Duke Blue Devils football team =

American college football season

1952 Duke Blue Devils football
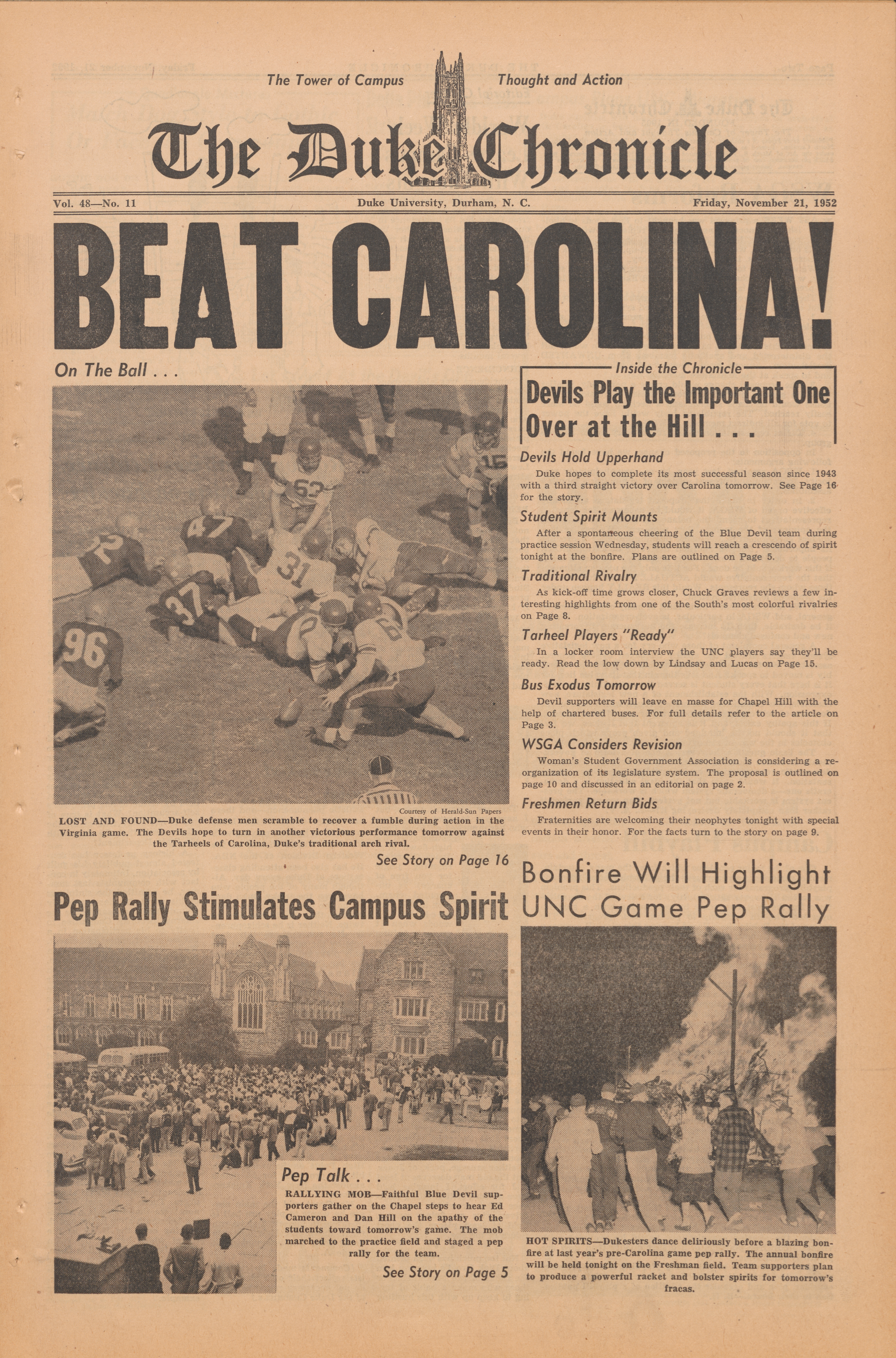
- A 1952 Duke Chronicle page about the team

SoCon champion
- Conference: Southern Conference

Ranking
- Coaches: No. 18
- AP: No. 16
- Record: 8–2 (5–0 SoCon)
- Head coach: William D. Murray (2nd season)
- MVP: Louis Tepe
- Captain: Louis Tepe
- Home stadium: Duke Stadium

1952 Southern Conference football standings
	Conf.					Overall
Team	W		L		T	W		L		T
No. 16 Duke $	5	–	0	–	0	8	–	2	–	0
Wake Forest	5	–	1	–	0	5	–	4	–	1
West Virginia	5	–	1	–	0	7	–	2	–	0
William & Mary	4	–	1	–	0	4	–	5	–	0
George Washington	4	–	2	–	1	5	–	3	–	1
VPI	4	–	4	–	0	5	–	6	–	0
Furman	2	–	2	–	1	6	–	3	–	1
Washington and Lee	3	–	4	–	0	3	–	7	–	0
VMI	2	–	3	–	1	3	–	6	–	1
NC State	2	–	4	–	0	3	–	7	–	0
South Carolina	2	–	4	–	0	5	–	5	–	0
North Carolina	1	–	2	–	0	2	–	6	–	0
The Citadel	1	–	3	–	1	3	–	5	–	1
Davidson	1	–	6	–	0	2	–	7	–	0
Richmond	0	–	6	–	0	1	–	9	–	0
Maryland †			–			7	–	2	–	0
Clemson †			–			2	–	6	–	1
$ – Conference champion; † League sanctions prevented Maryland and Clemson from conference participation; Rankings from AP Poll

The 1952 Duke Blue Devils football team was an American football team that represented Duke University as a member of the Southern Conference (SoCon) during the 1952 college football season. In their second year under head coach William D. Murray, the Blue Devils compiled an overall record of 8–2, with a conference record of 5–0, and finished as SoCon champion.

Duke won the 1952 Southern Conference Championship, and finished the season ranked 16th in the final AP poll.

== Schedule ==
Date	Time	Opponent	Rank	Site	Result	Attendance	Source
September 20		Washington and Lee	No. 19	Duke Stadium; Durham, NC	W 34–0	16,000	
September 26		at SMU*	No. 19	Cotton Bowl; Dallas, TX	W 14–7	28,000	
October 4		No. 11 Tennessee*	No. 10	Duke Stadium; Durham, NC	W 7–0	35,000	
October 11		at South Carolina	No. 6	Carolina Stadium; Columbia, SC	W 33–7	22,000–24,000	
October 18		at NC State	No. 5	Riddick Stadium; Raleigh, NC (rivalry)	W 57–0	11,500	
October 25		at No. 9 Virginia*	No. 6	Scott Stadium; Charlottesville, VA	W 21–7	34,000–35,000	
November 1		No. 4 Georgia Tech*^{†}	No. 6	Duke Stadium; Durham, NC	L 7–28	45,000	
November 8		Navy*	No. 12	Duke Stadium; Durham, NC	L 6–16	25,000–30,000	
November 15	2:00 p.m.	at Wake Forest		Groves Stadium; Wake Forest, NC (rivalry)	W 14–7	14,000	
November 22		at North Carolina	No. 20	Kenan Memorial Stadium; Chapel Hill, NC (Victory Bell)	W 34–0	34,000–42,000	
*Non-conference game; ^{†}Homecoming; Rankings from AP Poll released prior to the game; All times are in Eastern time
