= Vestaburg, Pennsylvania =

Unincorporated community in Pennsylvania, US

- Unincorporated community
- Location within Pennsylvania
- Coordinates: 40°00′58″N 79°59′23″W
- Country: United States
- State: Pennsylvania
- County: Washington
- Elevation: 945 ft (288 m)
- Time zone: UTC-5 (Eastern (EST))
  - Summer (DST): UTC-4 (EDT)
- ZIP code: 15368
- Area codes: 724, 878
- GNIS feature ID: 1193598

Vestaburg is an unincorporated community in Washington County, Pennsylvania, United States. The community is located along Pennsylvania Route 88 and the Monongahela River, 2 miles (3.2 km) south of Centerville. Vestaburg has a post office, with ZIP code 15368, which opened on March 4, 1916.
