= 1952 Clemson Tigers football team =

American college football season

1952 Clemson Tigers football
- Conference: Southern Conference
- Record: 2–6–1 (0–0 SoCon)
- Head coach: Frank Howard (13th season)
- Captain: George Rodgers
- Home stadium: Memorial Stadium

1952 Southern Conference football standings
	Conf.					Overall
Team	W		L		T	W		L		T
No. 16 Duke $	5	–	0	–	0	8	–	2	–	0
Wake Forest	5	–	1	–	0	5	–	4	–	1
West Virginia	5	–	1	–	0	7	–	2	–	0
William & Mary	4	–	1	–	0	4	–	5	–	0
George Washington	4	–	2	–	1	5	–	3	–	1
VPI	4	–	4	–	0	5	–	6	–	0
Furman	2	–	2	–	1	6	–	3	–	1
Washington and Lee	3	–	4	–	0	3	–	7	–	0
VMI	2	–	3	–	1	3	–	6	–	1
NC State	2	–	4	–	0	3	–	7	–	0
South Carolina	2	–	4	–	0	5	–	5	–	0
North Carolina	1	–	2	–	0	2	–	6	–	0
The Citadel	1	–	3	–	1	3	–	5	–	1
Davidson	1	–	6	–	0	2	–	7	–	0
Richmond	0	–	6	–	0	1	–	9	–	0
Maryland †			–			7	–	2	–	0
Clemson †			–			2	–	6	–	1
$ – Conference champion; † League sanctions prevented Maryland and Clemson from conference participation; Rankings from AP Poll

The 1952 Clemson Tigers football team was an American football team that represented Clemson College in the Southern Conference during the 1952 college football season. In its 13th season under head coach Frank Howard, the team compiled a 2–6–1 record and was outscored by a total of 157 to 112. The team played its home games at Memorial Stadium in Clemson, South Carolina.

When Clemson and Maryland defied the Southern Conference's ban on postseason games by participating in bowl games after the 1951 season, the conference placed both schools on probation for one year and imposed a football scheduling boycott against them. Accordingly, Clemson was able to play games against only two conference opponents in 1952: Maryland (also on probation) and South Carolina (the annual "Big Thursday" rivalry game was set by the South Carolina Legislature and was therefore exempted from the boycott).

George Rodgers was the captain of the 1952 Clemson team. The team's statistical leaders included tailback Don King with 317 passing yards and fullback Red Whitten with 445 rushing yards. Four players tied for the scoring leadership with 18 points each: Don King, Red Whitten, tailback Billy Hair, and wingback Buck George.

Three Clemson players were named to the All-South Carolina football team for 1952: Billy Hair, tackle Earl Wrightenberry, and guard Tom Barton.

Clemson did not return to the Southern Conference, opting in June 1953 to leave the conference along with Duke Maryland, North Carolina, NC State, South Carolina, and Wake Forest in forming the Atlantic Coast Conference (ACC).

== Schedule ==
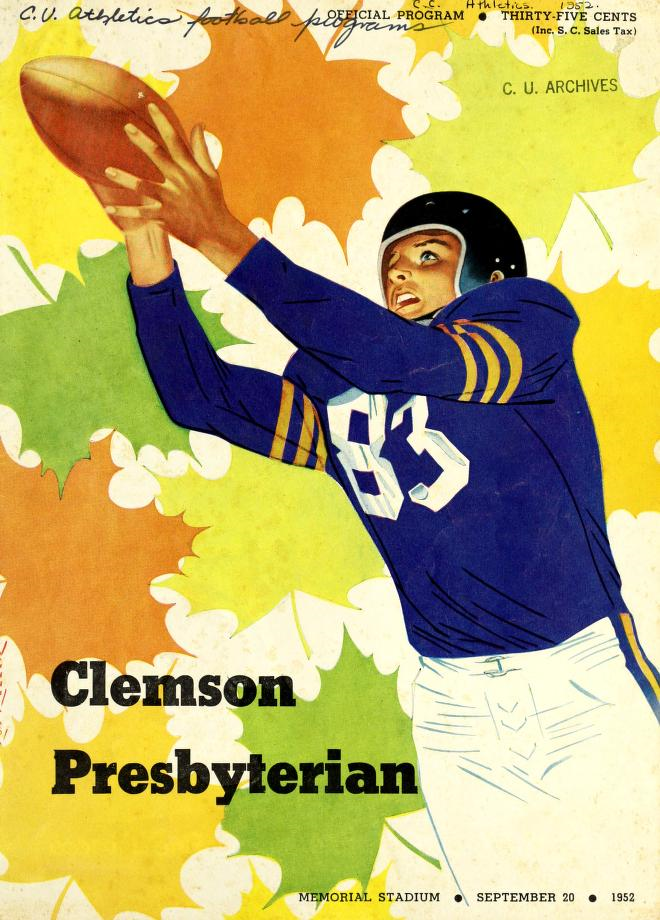
Program for the Presbyterian game

Date	Time	Opponent	Site	Result	Attendance	Source
September 20	8:00 p.m.	Presbyterian*	Memorial Stadium; Clemson, SC	W 53–13		
September 27	2:00 p.m.	Villanova*^{†}	Memorial Stadium; Clemson, SC	L 7–14	28,000	
October 4	2:00 p.m.	at No. 3 Maryland	Byrd Stadium; College Park, MD	L 0–28	32,000	
October 11	2:30 p.m.	at Florida*	Florida Field; Gainesville, FL	L 13–54	25,000	
October 23	2:00 p.m.	at South Carolina	Carolina Stadium; Columbia, SC (rivalry)	L 0–6	35,000	
October 31	8:30 p.m.	at Boston College*	Braves Field; Boston, MA (rivalry)	W 13–0	10,040	
November 8	1:30 p.m.	at Fordham*	Triborough Stadium; New York, NY	T 12–12	6,000	
November 15	2:00 p.m.	at Kentucky*	McLean Stadium; Lexington, KY	L 14–27	25,000	
November 22	2:00 p.m.	at Auburn*	Cliff Hare Stadium; Auburn, AL (rivalry)	L 0–3		
*Non-conference game; ^{†}Homecoming; Rankings from AP Poll released prior to the game; All times are in Eastern time
