= Papa Hall =

American football player (1931–2010)

Profile
- Position: Halfback

Personal information
- Born: April 2, 1931
- Died: September 15, 2010 (aged 79); Altamonte Springs, Florida, U.S.

Career information
- High school: Leon (Tallahassee, Florida)
- College: Florida (1952)

J. Lewis "Papa" Hall Jr. (April 2, 1931 – September 15, 2010) was a college football player and track athlete, and later an attorney and chief circuit court judge.

He was a prominent running back for the Florida Gators of the University of Florida, "recruited by every major Southern college." Hall and fellow backs Buford Long and Rick Casares were part of the Gators' winning backfield during the team's 8–3 season in 1952. Hall was its leading rusher. Hall was also an NCAA national champion high jumper in track and field. After college, he decided against a professional football career. Hall ran for ninety-four yards in the team's 14–13 Gator Bowl victory on New Year's Day 1953.

== See also ==
- List of University of Florida Athletic Hall of Fame members
