= 1952 VPI Gobblers football team =

American college football season

1952 VPI Gobblers football
- Conference: Southern Conference
- Record: 5–6 (4–4 SoCon)
- Head coach: Frank Moseley (2nd season)
- Home stadium: Miles Stadium

1952 Southern Conference football standings
	Conf.					Overall
Team	W		L		T	W		L		T
No. 16 Duke $	5	–	0	–	0	8	–	2	–	0
Wake Forest	5	–	1	–	0	5	–	4	–	1
West Virginia	5	–	1	–	0	7	–	2	–	0
William & Mary	4	–	1	–	0	4	–	5	–	0
George Washington	4	–	2	–	1	5	–	3	–	1
VPI	4	–	4	–	0	5	–	6	–	0
Furman	2	–	2	–	1	6	–	3	–	1
Washington and Lee	3	–	4	–	0	3	–	7	–	0
VMI	2	–	3	–	1	3	–	6	–	1
NC State	2	–	4	–	0	3	–	7	–	0
South Carolina	2	–	4	–	0	5	–	5	–	0
North Carolina	1	–	2	–	0	2	–	6	–	0
The Citadel	1	–	3	–	1	3	–	5	–	1
Davidson	1	–	6	–	0	2	–	7	–	0
Richmond	0	–	6	–	0	1	–	9	–	0
Maryland †			–			7	–	2	–	0
Clemson †			–			2	–	6	–	1
$ – Conference champion; † League sanctions prevented Maryland and Clemson from conference participation; Rankings from AP Poll

The 1952 VPI Gobblers football team represented the Virginia Polytechnic Institute or VPI (now known as Virginia Polytechnic Institute and State University or Virginia Tech) as a member of the Southern Conference (SoCon) during the 1952 college football season. Led by second-year head coach Frank Moseley the Gobblers compiled an overall record of 5–6 with a mark of 4–4 in conference play, and finished sixth in the SoCon. VPI played home games at Miles Stadium in Blacksburg, Virginia.

== Schedule ==
Date	Time	Opponent	Site	Result	Attendance	Source
September 13	8:00 p.m.	vs. Marshall*	Bluefield Municipal Stadium; Bluefield, WV	W 19–14	10,000	
September 20		at Davidson	Richardson Stadium; Davidson, NC	W 27–14		
September 27		at The Citadel	Johnson Hagood Stadium; Charleston, SC	W 14–7	8,000	
October 4		vs. No. 16 Virginia*	Victory Stadium; Roanoke, VA (rivalry)	L 0–42	15,000	
October 11	2:00 p.m.	at No. 18 Alabama*	Denny Stadium; Tuscaloosa, AL	L 0–33	16,000	
October 18		George Washington^{†}	Miles Stadium; Blacksburg, VA	L 0–6	11,000	
October 25	2:00 p.m.	at Washington and Lee	Wilson Field; Lexington, VA	L 27–34	7,000	
November 1	2:30 p.m.	at Richmond	City Stadium; Richmond, VA	W 20–2	7,000	
November 8		William & Mary	Miles Stadium; Blacksburg, VA	L 15–35	6,000	
November 15		at West Virginia	Mountaineer Field; Morgantown, WV (rivalry)	L 7–27		
November 27		vs. VMI	Victory Stadium; Roanoke, VA (rivalry)	W 26–7	25,000	
*Non-conference game; ^{†}Homecoming; Rankings from AP Poll released prior to the game

== Roster ==
The following players were members of the 1952 football team according to the roster published in the 1953 edition of The Bugle, the Virginia Tech yearbook.

VPI 1952 roster
Bob Allen; J. Allen; William R. Anderson; Richard VanMetre "Dickie" Beard; Boone; Donald C. Booth; Franklin Dewey Brown; Leo Burke; Doug Creger; Johnny Dean; Hugh David Ebert; James Glen Fleenor; Harold Byrd Grizzard	James H. Haren; Billy Harrison; Charles Donald Herb; Tom Hughes; William Duncan Kerfoot; Julian Neville King; Frank Ronald Kwiatkowski; Robert Stevens Luttrell; Don Mitchell; Gary Mitchess; John Stewart Moody; Madison "Buzz" Nutter; Thomas R. Petty	George Preas; Jim Randall; Thomas Carl Richards; Robert Earl Scruggs; Bobby Seal; Hunter E. Swink; Vickers; Webb; Don "Ducky" Welsh; Norman Chad White (Co-Capt.); Jack Williams; Ernie Wolfe; Howard Irving Wright
