= 1952 Wake Forest Demon Deacons football team =

American college football season

1952 Wake Forest Demon Deacons football
- Conference: Southern Conference
- Record: 5–4–1 (5–1 SoCon)
- Head coach: Tom Rogers (2nd season)
- Captain: Jack Lewis
- Home stadium: Groves Stadium

1952 Southern Conference football standings
	Conf.					Overall
Team	W		L		T	W		L		T
No. 16 Duke $	5	–	0	–	0	8	–	2	–	0
Wake Forest	5	–	1	–	0	5	–	4	–	1
West Virginia	5	–	1	–	0	7	–	2	–	0
William & Mary	4	–	1	–	0	4	–	5	–	0
George Washington	4	–	2	–	1	5	–	3	–	1
VPI	4	–	4	–	0	5	–	6	–	0
Furman	2	–	2	–	1	6	–	3	–	1
Washington and Lee	3	–	4	–	0	3	–	7	–	0
VMI	2	–	3	–	1	3	–	6	–	1
NC State	2	–	4	–	0	3	–	7	–	0
South Carolina	2	–	4	–	0	5	–	5	–	0
North Carolina	1	–	2	–	0	2	–	6	–	0
The Citadel	1	–	3	–	1	3	–	5	–	1
Davidson	1	–	6	–	0	2	–	7	–	0
Richmond	0	–	6	–	0	1	–	9	–	0
Maryland †			–			7	–	2	–	0
Clemson †			–			2	–	6	–	1
$ – Conference champion; † League sanctions prevented Maryland and Clemson from conference participation; Rankings from AP Poll

The 1952 Wake Forest Demon Deacons football team was an American football team that represented Wake Forest University during the 1952 college football season. In their second season under head coach Tom Rogers, the Demon Deacons compiled a 5–4–1 record and finished in a tie for second place in the Southern Conference with a 5–1 record against conference opponents.

End Jack Lewis was selected by the United Press as a first-team player on the 1952 All-Southern Conference football team.

== Schedule ==
Date	Time	Opponent	Site	Result	Attendance	Source
September 20		at Baylor*	Baylor Stadium; Waco, TX	L 14–17	16,000	
September 27		at William & Mary	Cary Field; Williamsburg, VA	W 28–21	13,000	
October 4		vs. Boston College*	Bowman Gray Stadium; Winston-Salem, NC	T 7–7	11,000	
October 11		at No. 14 Villanova*	Franklin Field; Philadelphia, PA	L 0–20	10,000	
October 18		at North Carolina	Kenan Memorial Stadium; Chapel Hill, NC (rivalry)	W 9–7	30,000	
November 1		NC State	Groves Stadium; Wake Forest, NC (rivalry)	W 21–6	12,000	
November 8		at TCU*	Amon G. Carter Stadium; Fort Worth, TX	L 9–27	12,000	
November 15	2:00 p.m.	Duke	Groves Stadium; Wake Forest, NC (rivalry)	L 7–14	14,000	
November 22		at Furman	Sirrine Stadium; Greenville, SC	W 28–0	10,000	
November 29	2:00 p.m.	vs. South Carolina	Bowman Gray Stadium; Winston-Salem, NC	W 39–14	6,000	
*Non-conference game; Rankings from AP Poll released prior to the game; All times are in Eastern time

== Team leaders ==
Category	Team Leader	Att/Cth	Yds
Passing	Sonny George	66/142	868
Rushing	Bruce Hillenbrand	89	413
Receiving	Jack Lewis	30	438
