= 1952 North Carolina Tar Heels football team =

American college football season

1952 North Carolina Tar Heels football
- Conference: Southern Conference
- Record: 2–6 (1–2 SoCon)
- Head coach: Carl Snavely (10th season)
- Captains: George Norris; Bud Wallace
- Home stadium: Kenan Memorial Stadium

1952 Southern Conference football standings
| | Conf. | | | | | Overall |
| Team | W | | L | | T | W | | L | | T |
|---|---|---|---|---|---|---|---|---|---|---|
| No. 16 Duke $ | 5 | – | 0 | – | 0 | 8 | – | 2 | – | 0 |
| Wake Forest | 5 | – | 1 | – | 0 | 5 | – | 4 | – | 1 |
| West Virginia | 5 | – | 1 | – | 0 | 7 | – | 2 | – | 0 |
| William & Mary | 4 | – | 1 | – | 0 | 4 | – | 5 | – | 0 |
| George Washington | 4 | – | 2 | – | 1 | 5 | – | 3 | – | 1 |
| VPI | 4 | – | 4 | – | 0 | 5 | – | 6 | – | 0 |
| Furman | 2 | – | 2 | – | 1 | 6 | – | 3 | – | 1 |
| Washington and Lee | 3 | – | 4 | – | 0 | 3 | – | 7 | – | 0 |
| VMI | 2 | – | 3 | – | 1 | 3 | – | 6 | – | 1 |
| NC State | 2 | – | 4 | – | 0 | 3 | – | 7 | – | 0 |
| South Carolina | 2 | – | 4 | – | 0 | 5 | – | 5 | – | 0 |
| North Carolina | 1 | – | 2 | – | 0 | 2 | – | 6 | – | 0 |
| The Citadel | 1 | – | 3 | – | 1 | 3 | – | 5 | – | 1 |
| Davidson | 1 | – | 6 | – | 0 | 2 | – | 7 | – | 0 |
| Richmond | 0 | – | 6 | – | 0 | 1 | – | 9 | – | 0 |
| Maryland † | | | – | | | 7 | – | 2 | – | 0 |
| Clemson † | | | – | | | 2 | – | 6 | – | 1 |
$ – Conference champion; † League sanctions prevented Maryland and Clemson from conference participation; Rankings from AP Poll

The 1952 North Carolina Tar Heels football team represented the University of North Carolina at Chapel Hill during the 1952 college football season. The Tar Heels were led by tenth-year head coach Carl Snavely, and played their home games at Kenan Memorial Stadium. The team competed as a member of the Southern Conference for the last time, before North Carolina and six other schools broke off from the SoCon to form the Atlantic Coast Conference.

At the conclusion of the season, Snavely resigned as head coach after ten seasons. He posted a record of 59–35–5 while at UNC, retiring as the school's all-time winningest coach.

== Schedule ==
| Date | Time | Opponent | Site | Result | Attendance | Source |
|---|---|---|---|---|---|---|
| September 27 | 2:30 p.m. | No. 11 Texas* | Kenan Memorial Stadium; Chapel Hill, NC | L 7–28 | 40,000 | |
| October 18 | 2:00 p.m. | Wake Forest | Kenan Memorial Stadium; Chapel Hill, NC (rivalry) | L 7–9 | 30,000 | |
| October 25 | 1:30 p.m. | at No. 16 Notre Dame* | Notre Dame Stadium; South Bend, IN (rivalry) | L 14–34 | 54,338 | |
| November 1 | 2:00 p.m. | at No. 12 Tennessee* | Shields–Watkins Field; Knoxville, TN | L 14–41 | 22,000 | |
| November 8 | 2:00 p.m. | Virginia*^{†} | Kenan Memorial Stadium; Chapel Hill, NC (South's Oldest Rivalry) | L 7–34 | 25,000 | |
| November 15 | 2:00 p.m. | at South Carolina | Carolina Stadium; Columbia, SC (rivalry) | W 27–19 | 20,000 | |
| November 22 | 2:00 p.m. | No. 20 Duke | Kenan Memorial Stadium; Chapel Hill, NC (Victory Bell) | L 0–34 | 34,000–42,000 | |
| November 28 | 8:15 p.m. | at Miami (FL)* | Burdine Stadium; Miami, FL | W 34–7 | 20,000 | |
*Non-conference game; ^{†}Homecoming; Rankings from AP Poll released prior to the game; All times are in Eastern time
