= 1952 Washington and Lee Generals football team =

American college football season

1952 Washington and Lee Generals football
- Conference: Southern Conference
- Record: 3–7 (3–4 SoCon)
- Head coach: Carl Wise (1st season)
- Home stadium: Wilson Field

1952 Southern Conference football standings
	Conf.					Overall
Team	W		L		T	W		L		T
No. 16 Duke $	5	–	0	–	0	8	–	2	–	0
Wake Forest	5	–	1	–	0	5	–	4	–	1
West Virginia	5	–	1	–	0	7	–	2	–	0
William & Mary	4	–	1	–	0	4	–	5	–	0
George Washington	4	–	2	–	1	5	–	3	–	1
VPI	4	–	4	–	0	5	–	6	–	0
Furman	2	–	2	–	1	6	–	3	–	1
Washington and Lee	3	–	4	–	0	3	–	7	–	0
VMI	2	–	3	–	1	3	–	6	–	1
NC State	2	–	4	–	0	3	–	7	–	0
South Carolina	2	–	4	–	0	5	–	5	–	0
North Carolina	1	–	2	–	0	2	–	6	–	0
The Citadel	1	–	3	–	1	3	–	5	–	1
Davidson	1	–	6	–	0	2	–	7	–	0
Richmond	0	–	6	–	0	1	–	9	–	0
Maryland †			–			7	–	2	–	0
Clemson †			–			2	–	6	–	1
$ – Conference champion; † League sanctions prevented Maryland and Clemson from conference participation; Rankings from AP Poll

The 1952 Washington and Lee Generals football team was an American football team that represented Washington and Lee University during the 1952 college football season as a member of the Southern Conference. In their first year under head coach Carl Wise, the team compiled an overall record of 3–7, with a mark of 3–4 in conference play.

== Schedule ==
Date	Opponent	Site	Result	Attendance	Source
September 20	at No. 19 Duke	Duke Stadium; Durham, NC	L 0–34	16,000	
September 27	at Davidson	Richardson Field; Davidson, NC	W 33–14		
October 4	at George Washington	George Washington HS Stadium; Alexandria, VA	L 28-33	7,500	
October 11	at Richmond	City Stadium; Richmond, VA	W 21–20	5,000	
October 18	vs. West Virginia	Fort Hill Stadium; Cumberland, MD	L 13–31	> 5,000	
October 25	VPI^{†}	Wilson Field; Lexington, VA	W 34–27	7,000	
November 1	at Vanderbilt*	Dudley Field; Nashville, TN	L 7–67	16,000	
November 8	NC State	Wilson Field; Lexington, VA	L 14–25		
November 15	at Cincinnati*	Nippert Stadium; Cincinnati, OH	L 0–54		
November 22	at Virginia*	Scott Stadium; Charlottesville, VA	L 14–21	14,000	
*Non-conference game; ^{†}Homecoming; Rankings from AP Poll released prior to the game
