= 1952 Maryland Terrapins football team =

American college football season

1952 Maryland Terrapins football
- Conference: Southern Conference

Ranking
- Coaches: No. 13
- AP: No. 13
- Record: 7–2 (0–0 (Note: Maryland was a member of the Southern Conference, but was disallowed from playing any conference opponents during the 1952 season as part of the sanctions for violating the ban on postseason play the year prior.) SoCon)
- Head coach: Jim Tatum (6th season)
- Offensive scheme: Split-T
- Home stadium: Byrd Stadium

1952 Southern Conference football standings
	Conf.					Overall
Team	W		L		T	W		L		T
No. 16 Duke $	5	–	0	–	0	8	–	2	–	0
Wake Forest	5	–	1	–	0	5	–	4	–	1
West Virginia	5	–	1	–	0	7	–	2	–	0
William & Mary	4	–	1	–	0	4	–	5	–	0
George Washington	4	–	2	–	1	5	–	3	–	1
VPI	4	–	4	–	0	5	–	6	–	0
Furman	2	–	2	–	1	6	–	3	–	1
Washington and Lee	3	–	4	–	0	3	–	7	–	0
VMI	2	–	3	–	1	3	–	6	–	1
NC State	2	–	4	–	0	3	–	7	–	0
South Carolina	2	–	4	–	0	5	–	5	–	0
North Carolina	1	–	2	–	0	2	–	6	–	0
The Citadel	1	–	3	–	1	3	–	5	–	1
Davidson	1	–	6	–	0	2	–	7	–	0
Richmond	0	–	6	–	0	1	–	9	–	0
Maryland †			–			7	–	2	–	0
Clemson †			–			2	–	6	–	1
$ – Conference champion; † League sanctions prevented Maryland and Clemson from conference participation; Rankings from AP Poll

The 1952 Maryland Terrapins football team represented the University of Maryland in 1952 college football season as a member of the Southern Conference (SoCon). However, during the 1952 season, Maryland underwent sanctions by the Southern Conference that disallowed the team from playing any conference opponents. This was in response to Maryland's violation of a newly instituted ban on postseason play the year prior by its participation in the 1952 Sugar Bowl. Jim Tatum served as the head coach for the sixth season of his nine-year tenure. The team compiled a 7–2 record The loss against 14th-ranked Mississippi ended Maryland's school-record 22-game winning streak. After the season, Maryland left the Southern Conference in order to become a founding member of the Atlantic Coast Conference (ACC).

== Schedule ==
Date	Opponent	Rank	Site	Result	Attendance	Source
September 20	at Missouri*	No. 2	Memorial Stadium; Columbia, MO	W 13–10	18,000	
September 27	at Auburn*	No. 2	Legion Field; Birmingham, AL	W 13–7	27,000	
October 4	Clemson*	No. 3	Byrd Stadium; College Park, MD	W 28–0	32,000	
October 11	at No. 19 Georgia*	No. 4	Sanford Stadium; Athens, GA	W 37–0	34,000	
October 18	No. 20 Navy*	No. 2	Byrd Stadium; College Park, MD (Crab Bowl Classic)	W 38–7	44,716	
October 25	LSU*^{†}	No. 2	Byrd Stadium; College Park, MD	W 34–6	30,000	
November 1	at Boston University*	No. 2	Fenway Park; Boston, MA	W 34–7	32,568	
November 15	at No. 11 Ole Miss*	No. 3	Hemingway Stadium; Oxford, MS	L 14–21	32,500	
November 22	at No. 14 Alabama*	No. 8	Ladd Stadium; Mobile, AL	L 7–27	33,178	
*Non-conference game; ^{†}Homecoming; Rankings from Coaches' Poll released prior to the game

== Personnel ==
=== Coaching staff ===
- Jim Tatum, head coach
- Bob Ward, line coach
- Jack Hennemier, defensive line coach
- Warren Giese, ends coach
- Tommy Mont, backfield coach
- Eddie Teague, defensive backfield coach
- Emmett Cheek, freshman coach
- Vern Seibert, assistant freshman coach
- Duke Wyre, head trainer
- John Lacey, assistant trainer
