= 1952 NC State Wolfpack football team =

American college football season

1952 NC State Wolfpack football
- Conference: Southern Conference
- Record: 3–7 (2–4 SoCon)
- Head coach: Horace Hendrickson (1st season)
- Home stadium: Riddick Stadium

1952 Southern Conference football standings
	Conf.					Overall
Team	W		L		T	W		L		T
No. 16 Duke $	5	–	0	–	0	8	–	2	–	0
Wake Forest	5	–	1	–	0	5	–	4	–	1
West Virginia	5	–	1	–	0	7	–	2	–	0
William & Mary	4	–	1	–	0	4	–	5	–	0
George Washington	4	–	2	–	1	5	–	3	–	1
VPI	4	–	4	–	0	5	–	6	–	0
Furman	2	–	2	–	1	6	–	3	–	1
Washington and Lee	3	–	4	–	0	3	–	7	–	0
VMI	2	–	3	–	1	3	–	6	–	1
NC State	2	–	4	–	0	3	–	7	–	0
South Carolina	2	–	4	–	0	5	–	5	–	0
North Carolina	1	–	2	–	0	2	–	6	–	0
The Citadel	1	–	3	–	1	3	–	5	–	1
Davidson	1	–	6	–	0	2	–	7	–	0
Richmond	0	–	6	–	0	1	–	9	–	0
Maryland †			–			7	–	2	–	0
Clemson †			–			2	–	6	–	1
$ – Conference champion; † League sanctions prevented Maryland and Clemson from conference participation; Rankings from AP Poll

The 1952 NC State Wolfpack football team represented North Carolina State University during the 1952 college football season. The Wolfpack were led by first-year head coach Horace Hendrickson and played their home games at Riddick Stadium in Raleigh, North Carolina. They competed as members of the Southern Conference for the final year before joining six other larger SoCon schools in creating the Atlantic Coast Conference in 1953.

== Schedule ==
Date	Opponent	Site	Result	Attendance	Source
September 27	George Washington	Riddick Stadium; Raleigh, NC	L 0–39	7,500	
October 4	at Georgia*	Sanford Stadium; Athens, GA	L 0–49	22,000	
October 11	Davidson	Riddick Stadium; Raleigh, NC	W 28–6	5,500	
October 18	No. 5 Duke	Riddick Stadium; Raleigh, NC (rivalry)	L 0–57	11,500	
October 25	Florida State*^{†}	Riddick Stadium; Raleigh, NC	W 13–7	6,000	
November 1	at Wake Forest	Groves Stadium; Wake Forest, NC (rivalry)	L 6–21	12,000	
November 8	at Washington and Lee	Wilson Field; Lexington, VA	W 25–14		
November 15	at No. 14 Pittsburgh*	Pitt Stadium; Pittsburgh, PA	L 6–48	12,000	
November 22	at William & Mary	Cary Field; Williamsburg, VA	L 6–41	3,000	
December 6	at Texas Tech*	Jones Stadium; Lubbock, TX	L 7–54	10,000–11,000	
*Non-conference game; ^{†}Homecoming; Rankings from AP Poll released prior to the game
