= 1951 All-Pacific Coast football team =

American all-star college football team

The 1951 All-Pacific Coast football team consists of American football players chosen by the Associated Press (AP) and the United Press (UP) as the best college football players by position in the Pacific Coast region during the 1951 college football season. The AP selections included separate offensive and defensive units and were based on the consensus views of "football experts and coaches throughout the Pacific Coast." The UP selections did not include a separate defensive unit and were made by the region's coaches.

The 1951 Stanford Indians football team won the Pacific Coast Conference championship with a 9–2 record. Stanford dominated the AP selections with six players, three on offense and three on defense.

Two Pacific Coast players, end Bill McColl of Stanford and guard Les Richter of California, were also consensus picks on the 1951 All-America college football team.

Five of the players named to the first team were later inducted into the College Football Hall of Fame: McColl, Richter, and backs Frank Gifford of USC, Ollie Matson of the University of San Francisco, and Hugh McElhenny of Washington State.

== Selections ==
=== Backs ===
- Gary Kerkorian, Stanford (AP-1 [offense]; UP-1)
- Frank Gifford, USC (AP-1 [offense]; UP-1)
- Ollie Matson, San Francisco (AP-1 [offense]; UP-1)
- Hugh McElhenny, Washington (AP-1 [offense]; UP-1)
- Paul Cameron, UCLA (AP-2; UP-2)
- Ed Brown, San Francisco (AP-2; UP-2)
- Eddie Macon, Pacific (AP-3; UP-2)
- Bill Earley, Washington (AP-2)
- Johnny Olszewski, California (AP-2)
- Don Klosterman, Loyola (UP-2)
- Bob Mathias, Stanford (AP-3; UP-3)
- D. Rassmussen (AP-3)
- Dick Horn, Stanford (UP-3)
- Dave Mann, Oregon State (UP-3)
- Harry Hugasian, Stanford (UP-3)

=== Ends ===
- Bill McColl, Stanford (AP-1 [offense]; UP-1)
- Ed Barker, Washington State (AP-1 [offense]; UP-1)
- Don Steinbrunner, Washington State (AP-1 [defense]; UP-3)
- Ron Eadie, Stanford (AP-1 [defense])
- Ernie Stockert, UCLA (AP-2; UP-2)
- Gern Nagler, Santa Clara (AP-2)
- Ed Bartlett, California (AP-2)
- J. Paterson, UCLA (AP-2)
- Fred Snyder, Loyola (UP-2)
- John Thomas, Oregon State (AP-3)
- Phil Gillis, Washington (AP-3)
- John Rye, Stanford (AP-3)
- Tom Nickoloff, USC (AP-3)
- Bob St. Clair, San Francisco (UP-3)

=== Tackles ===
- Herman Clark, Oregon State (AP-1 [offense]; UP-1)
- Hal Mitchell, UCLA (AP-2; UP-1)
- Gino Marchetti, San Francisco (AP-1 [defense]; UP-2)
- Bob Karpe, California (AP-1 [offense]; UP-3)
- Al Kirkland, Stanford (AP-1 [defense])
- Burl Toler, San Francisco (AP-2; UP-2)
- Harold Lokovsek, Washington State (AP-2)
- Don Ringe, Idaho (AP-2)
- Bob Van Doren, USC (AP-2)
- Charlie Ane Jr., USC (AP-3; UP-3)
- Jim Vick, Stanford (AP-3)
- C. Weeks, USC (AP-3)
- Doug Hogland, Oregon State (AP-3)

=== Guards ===
- Les Richter, California (AP-1 [offensive guard and linebacker]; UP-1)
- Norm Manoogian, Stanford (AP-1 [offense]; UP-2)
- Pat Cannamela, USC (AP-2; UP-1)
- Duane Putnam, Pacific (AP-1 [defense]; UP-3)
- Chuck Essegian, Stanford (AP-1 [defense])
- Ted Holzknecht, Washington (AP-2; UP-2)
- Elmer Wilhoite, USC (AP-2; UP-3)
- Albert Sanbrano, USC (AP-2)
- Donald Zarosinski, Oregon State (AP-2)
- G. Norton, Washington (AP-3)
- Ed Flynn, UCLA (AP-3)
- A. Fiero, Washington State (AP-3)
- H. Cook, Stanford (AP-3)
- T. Cuffe, San Jose State (AP-3 [linebacker])

=== Centers ===
- Charles Harris, California (AP-1 [offense]; UP-1)
- Donn Moomaw, UCLA (AP-1 [defense, linebacker]; UP-2)
- Lou Welsh, USC (AP-2)
- Jim Wiley, Washington (AP-2 [linebacker])
- G. Pace, UCLA (AP-3)
- Bob Holder, Idaho (UP-3)

=== Defensive backs ===
- Dick Lemmon, California (AP-1 [defensive halfback])
- George Shaw, Oregon (AP-1 [defensive halfback])
- Johnny Williams, USC (AP-1 [safety])
- Byron Bailey, Washington State (AP-2)
- Sam Baker, Oregon State (AP-2)
- Don Robison, California (AP-3)
- Dick Sprague, Washington (AP-3)
- Joe Scudero, San Francisco (AP-3)

== Key ==
AP = Associated Press

UP = United Press

Bold = Consensus first-team selection of the AP and UP

== See also ==
- 1951 College Football All-America Team
