= 1952 All-America college football team =

Official list of the best college football players of 1952

The 1952 All-America college football team is composed of college football players who were selected as All-Americans by various organizations and writers that chose All-America college football teams in 1952. The eight selectors recognized by the NCAA as "official" for the 1952 season are (1) the Associated Press, (2) the United Press, (3) the All-America Board, (4) the American Football Coaches Association (AFCA), (5) the Football Writers Association of America (FWAA), (6) the International News Service (INS), (7) the Newspaper Enterprise Association (NEA), and (8) the Sporting News.

Maryland quarterback Jack Scarbath and Notre Dame halfback Johnny Lattner were the only two players to be unanimously named first-team All-Americans by all eight official selectors. Lattner was awarded the 1953 Heisman Trophy.

== Consensus All-Americans ==
For the year 1952, the NCAA recognizes eight published All-American teams as "official" designations for purposes of its consensus determinations. The following chart identifies the NCAA-recognized consensus All-Americans and displays which first-team designations they received.

Name	Position	School	Number	Official	Other
Jack Scarbath	Quarterback	Maryland	8/8	AAB, AFCA, AP, FWAA, INS, NEA, SN, UP	Look
Johnny Lattner	Halfback	Notre Dame	8/8	AAB, AFCA, AP, FWAA, INS, NEA, SN, UP	WC
Billy Vessels	Halfback	Oklahoma	7/8	AAB, AP, FWAA, INS, NEA, SN, UP	WC
John Michels	Guard	Tennessee	6/8	AAB, AP, FWAA, NEA, SN, UP	WC
Frank McPhee	End	Princeton	5/8	AAB, INS, NEA, SN, UP	WC
Dick Modzelewski	Tackle	Maryland	5/8	AFCA, AAB, NEA, SN, UP	WC
Donn Moomaw	Center	UCLA	5/8	AFCA, AP, NEA, SN, UP	WC
Bernie Flowers	End	Purdue	5/8	AAB, FWAA, NEA, SN, UP	WC
Elmer Willhoite	Guard	USC	5/8	AFCA, FWAA INS, NEA, UP	WC
Tom Catlin	Center	Oklahoma	5/8	AAB, FWAA, INS, NEA, SN	--
Hal Miller	Tackle	Georgia Tech	4/8	FWAA, NEA, SN, UP	WC
Jim Sears	Halfback	USC	3/8	AP, INS, NEA	WC

== All-American selections for 1952 ==
=== Ends ===
- Frank McPhee, Princeton (AAB, INS, NEA, SN, UP, WC, CP-1)
- Bernie Flowers, Purdue (AAB, FWAA, NEA, SN, UP, WC, CP-1)
- Eddie Bell, Pennsylvania (AFCA, INS, AP-2, CP-3)
- Tom Stolhandske, Texas (AP-1, FWAA, INS)
- Tom Scott, Virginia (AP-1; NEA)
- Joe Collier, Northwestern (INS)
- Don Branby, Colorado (AP-1)
- Buck Martin, Georgia Tech (AFCA)
- Steve Meilinger, Kentucky (NEA)
- Ed Luke, Michigan State (AP-2)
- Harry Babcock, Georgia (AP-2, CP-2)
- Ed Woodsum, Yale (CP-2)
- Lowell Perry, Michigan (CP-3)

=== Tackles ===
- Dick Modzelewski, Maryland (College Football Hall of Fame) (AFCA, AAB, NEA, SN, UP, WC, CP-1)
- Hal Miller, Georgia Tech (AP-3, FWAA, NEA, SN, UP, WC, CP-1)
- Doug Atkins, Tennessee (AAB; INS)
- Ed Meadows, Duke (AFCA; AP-2; CP-2)
- Kline Gilbert, Mississippi (AP-1, FWAA)
- Dave Suminski, Wisconsin (AP-1)
- Harvey Achziger, Colorado A&M (INS)
- Bob Fleck, Syracuse (INS)
- J.D. Kimmel, Houston (AP-1)
- Charlie LaPradd, Florida (AP-1)
- Jerry Minnick, Nebraska (INS)
- Ollie Spencer, Kansas (NEA)
- Ben Dunkerley, West Virginia (AP-2)
- Eldred Kraemer, Pittsburgh (AP-2)
- William "Bill" Skyinskus, Syracuse (AP-2)
- Bob Van Doren, USC (CP-2)
- Sam Palumbo, Notre Dame (CP-3)
- Vic Rimkus, Holy Cross (CP-3)

=== Guards ===
- John Michels, Tennessee (College Football Hall of Fame) (AAB, AP-1, FWAA, NEA, SN, UP, WC)
- Elmer Willhoite, Southern California (AFCA, AP-2, FWAA, INS, NEA, UP, WC, CP-1)
- Steve Eisenhauer, Navy (AP-1, INS, NEA, SN, CP-2)
- Harley Sewell, Texas (AFCA, AAB, AP-2, NEA, CP-1)
- Marv Matuszak, Tulsa (AP-1)
- Frank Kush, Michigan State (AP-1, CP-3)
- Michael "Mike" Takacs, Ohio State (INS)
- James "Jim" Reichenbach, Ohio State (AP-2)
- Chester Millett, Holy Cross (AP-2)
- Bill Athey, Baylor (CP-2)
- Crawford Mims, Mississippi (CP-3)

=== Centers ===
- Donn Moomaw, UCLA (College Football Hall of Fame) (AFCA, AP-1, NEA, SN, UP, WC, CP-2)
- Tom Catlin, Oklahoma (AAB, FWAA, INS, NEA, SN, CP-3)
- Dick Tamburo, Michigan State (AP-1, CP-1, INS)
- Pete Brown, Georgia Tech (AP-1)
- Joe Schmidt, Pittsburgh (INS)
- James Dooley, Penn State (AP-2)
- Tom Catlin, Oklahoma (AP-2)
- George Morris, Georgia Tech (AP-2)

=== Backs ===
- Jack Scarbath, Maryland (College Football Hall of Fame) (AAB, AFCA, AP-1, COL-1, FWAA, INS, NEA, SN, UP, Look-1, CP-2)
- Johnny Lattner, Notre Dame (College Football Hall of Fame) (AAB; AFCA; AP-1, FWAA, INS, NEA, SN, UP, WC, CP-1)
- Billy Vessels, Oklahoma (Heisman Trophy winner and College Football Hall of Fame) (AAB; AP-1, FWAA, INS, NEA, SN, UP, WC, CP-1)
- Jim Sears, Southern California (AP-1, INS, NEA; WC)
- Don McAuliffe, Michigan State (AAB; COL-1, UP, CP-3)
- Leon Hardeman, Georgia Tech (AAB, INS, SN, CP-3)
- Johnny Olszewski, California (INS, NEA, AP-2, CP-2)
- Bobby Morehead, Georgia Tech (AP-1, INS)
- Paul Giel, Minnesota (AP-1, FWAA, CP-2)
- Buck McPhail, Oklahoma (AFCA)
- Lowell Perry, Michigan (NEA)
- Paul Cameron, UCLA (NEA)
- Don Heinrich, Washington (AP-1, CP-3)
- Gene Filipski, Villanova (FWAA)
- Andy Kozar, Tennessee (AP-2, CP-3)
- Bobby Marlow, Alabama (AP-2, CP-2)
- Ed Mioduszewski, William & Mary (AP-2)
- Val Joe Walker, Southern Methodist (AP-2)
- Norris Mullis, South Carolina (AP-2)
- Gilbert "Gil" Reich, Kansas (AP-2)
- Eddie Crowder, Oklahoma (CP-1)
- Alan Ameche, Wisconsin (CP-1)

== Key ==
- **Bold** – Consensus All-American
- -1 – First-team selection
- -2 – Second-team selection
- -3 – Third-team selection

=== Official selectors ===
- AAB = All-America Board
- AFCA = American Football Coaches Association
- AP = Associated Press
- FWAA = Football Writers Association of America
- INS = International News Service
- NEA = Newspaper Enterprise Association
- SN = Sporting News
- UP = United Press

=== Other selectors ===
- CP = Central Press Association
- WC = Walter Camp Football Foundation

== See also ==
- 1952 All-Big Seven Conference football team
- 1952 All-Big Ten Conference football team
- 1952 All-Pacific Coast Conference football team
- 1952 All-SEC football team
- 1952 All-Southwest Conference football team
