= Elmer Wilhoite =

American football player and boxer (1930–2008)

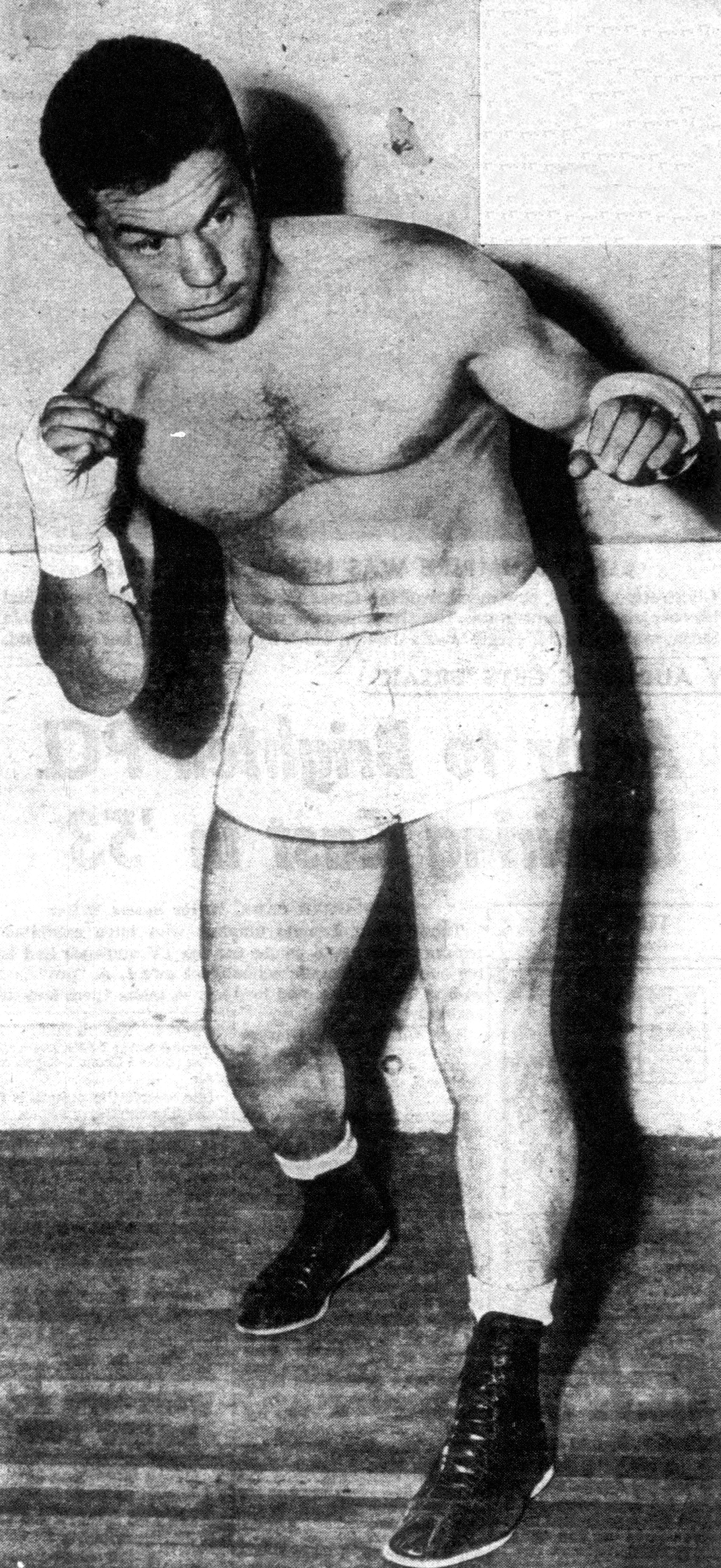
- Wilhoite, circa 1953

Profile
- Position: Guard

Personal information
- Born: May 3, 1930; Merced County, California, U.S.
- Died: August 19, 2008 (aged 78); Hawthorne, Nevada, U.S.

Career information
- High school: Merced High School
- College: University of Southern California

Career history
- 1951–1952: USC Trojans

Awards and highlights
- Consensus All-American (1952); First-team All-PCC (1952); Second-team All-PCC (1951)

Elmer Ellsworth Wilhoite (May 3, 1930 – August 19, 2008) was an American football player and boxer. He played college football for the USC Trojans and was a consensus selection at the guard position on the 1952 College Football All-America Team.

== Early life ==
Wilhoite was born in Merced County, California, in 1930. He attended Merced High School. He was a star athlete in the shot put during high school, throwing the 12-pound shot 56 feet, 6 inches, breaking a high school athletic record set by Bob Mathias.

== USC ==
Whilhoite enrolled at the University of Southern California and, while there, played at the guard position on the USC football team in 1951 and 1952. In the UCLA–USC rivalry in 1952, both teams were undefeated and untied and played for a spot in the 1953 Rose Bowl. Wilhoite set up the game-winning touchdown when he intercepted a Paul Cameron pass and returned it 72 yards to UCLA's eight-yard line. The Trojans won the 1953 Rose Bowl by a 7–0 score over Wisconsin, and Wilhoite was a consensus selection for the 1952 College Football All-America Team.

== Later life ==
Wilhoite was selected by the Cleveland Browns in the 12th round of the 1953 NFL draft, but he instead pursued a career as a boxer. In his first fight, he won by a knockout after 45 second of the first round against Humphrey Jiminez at Merced, California. In September 1953, he won his second professional bout by a second-round technical knockout (TKO) over Clayton Mann in a match at the Olympic Auditorium in Los Angeles.

In 1954, he tried out with the Toronto Argonauts of the Canadian Football League (CFL), but he was released in early August 1954. He signed with the Baltimore Colts in December 1954, but did not make the team in 1955. In July 1957, he signed with the Calgary Stampeders of the CFL.

Wilhoite returned briefly to boxing in 1958. He later operated H&S International, a salvage company. Wilhoite was married to Judy Berg and had a son, Edward, in addition to her sons, Anthony and Bill, from a previous marriage. The couple later divorced. He had six grandchildren: Travis Wilhoite (Edward), Courtney, Kyle, Angela and Rachel Vassalo (Bill), and Lily Vassalo (Anthony). Wilhoite died in 2008 at Hawthorne, Nevada.
