= List of NCAA football retired numbers =

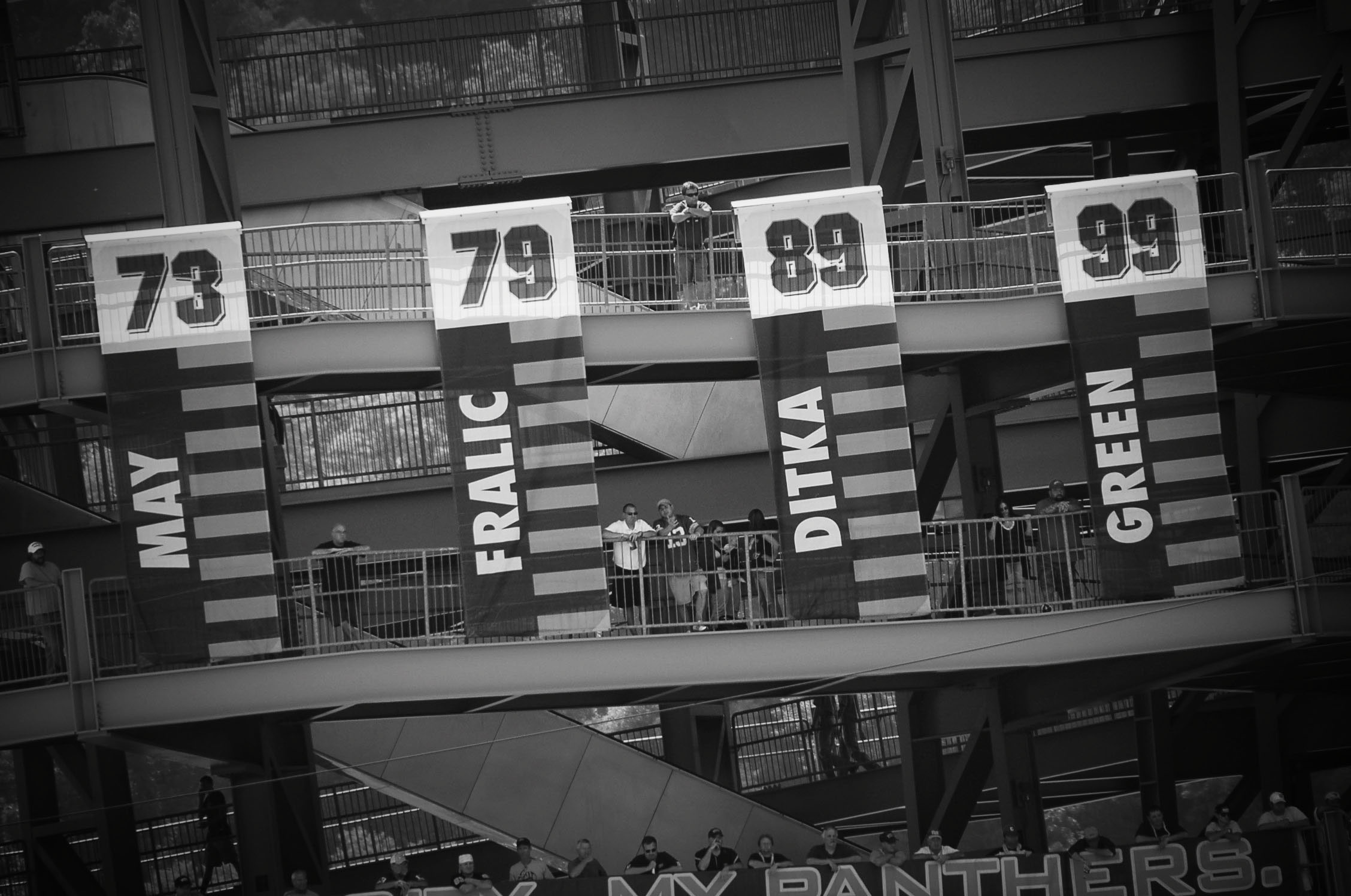
Pittsburgh Panthers retired numbers at Acrisure Stadium, September 2011

Teams in the National Collegiate Athletic Association (NCAA) retire jersey numbers of players who either are considered by the team to have made significant contributions to that team's success, or who have experienced untimely deaths during their playing career. As with other leagues, once a team retires a player's jersey number, it never issues the number to any other player, unless the player or team explicitly allows it.

== History ==
Since NCAA teams began retiring numbers, many players have had their jersey number retired. Pittsburgh have the most retired numbers with 10. Unlike professional leagues, no one player has had his number retired by two teams.

Unlike major sports leagues in the United States such as MLB (which retired Jackie Robinson's number 42), the NHL (which did so for Wayne Gretzky's 99), and the NBA (Bill Russell's 6) the NCAA has never retired a jersey number league-wide in honor of anyone.

Nevertheless, there are some cases of retirement of a same number honoring two different players, such as Houston, which retired number 7 worn by David Klingler and Case Keenum, among other similar cases.

Moreover, Michigan retired a number for three players, the #11 in honor of the Wistert brothers. Brigham Young University (BYU) did the same, retiring number 6 for three different players, Marc Wilson, Robbie Bosco, and Luke Staley.

Since 2005, Syracuse holds the record of players honored with a number retirement after the University retired no. 44 worn by 25 different players between 1921 and 1998.

There are also some strange cases such as UCLA retiring #42 for Jackie Robinson; although he wore No. 28 for the football team; the school chose to retire No. 42 because it was more identified with him after Robinson wore that number throughout his Hall of Fame baseball career with the Brooklyn Dodgers.

== Retired numbers ==
Elected to the College Football Hall of Fame

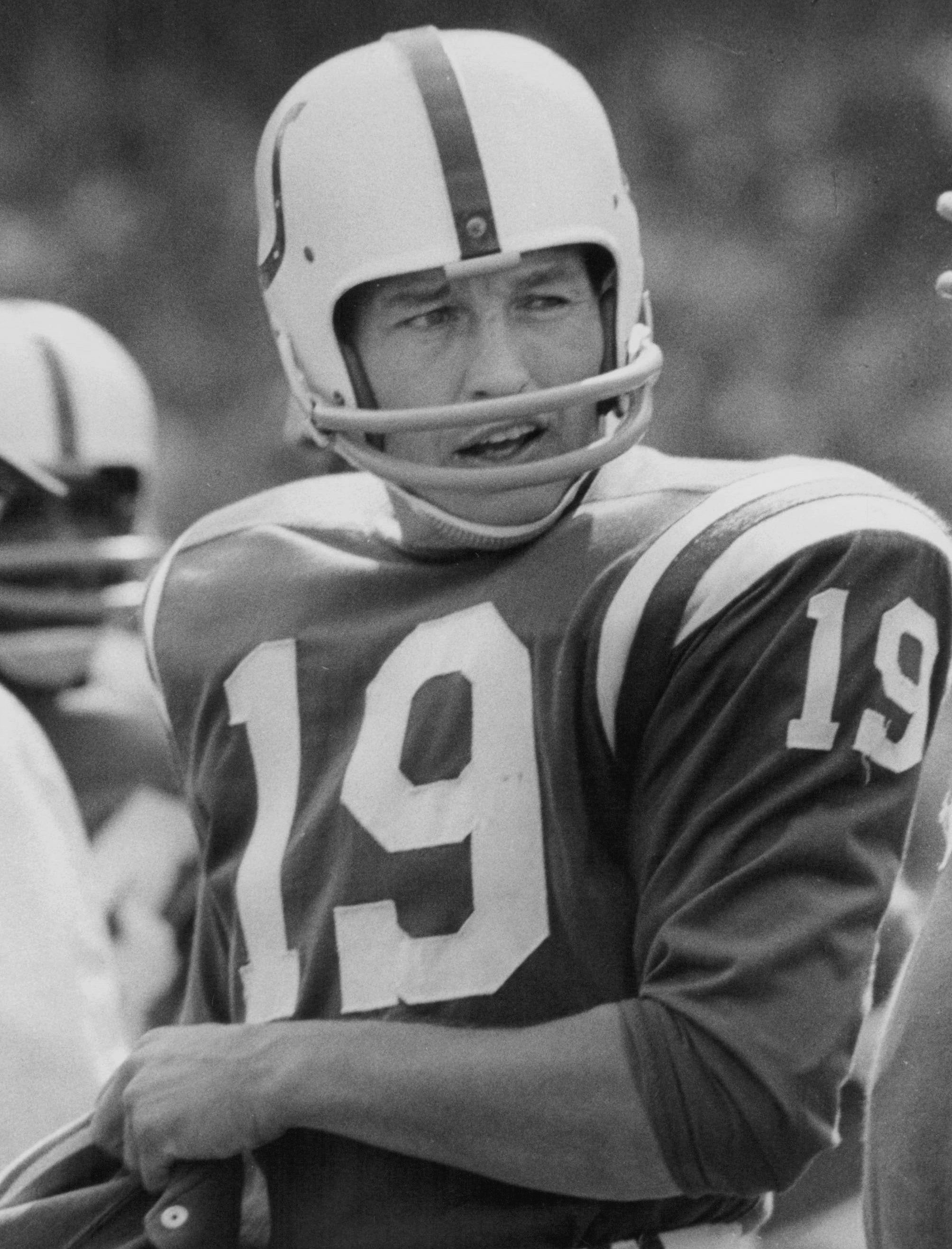
Johnny Unitas' #16 was retired by Louisville in 2003

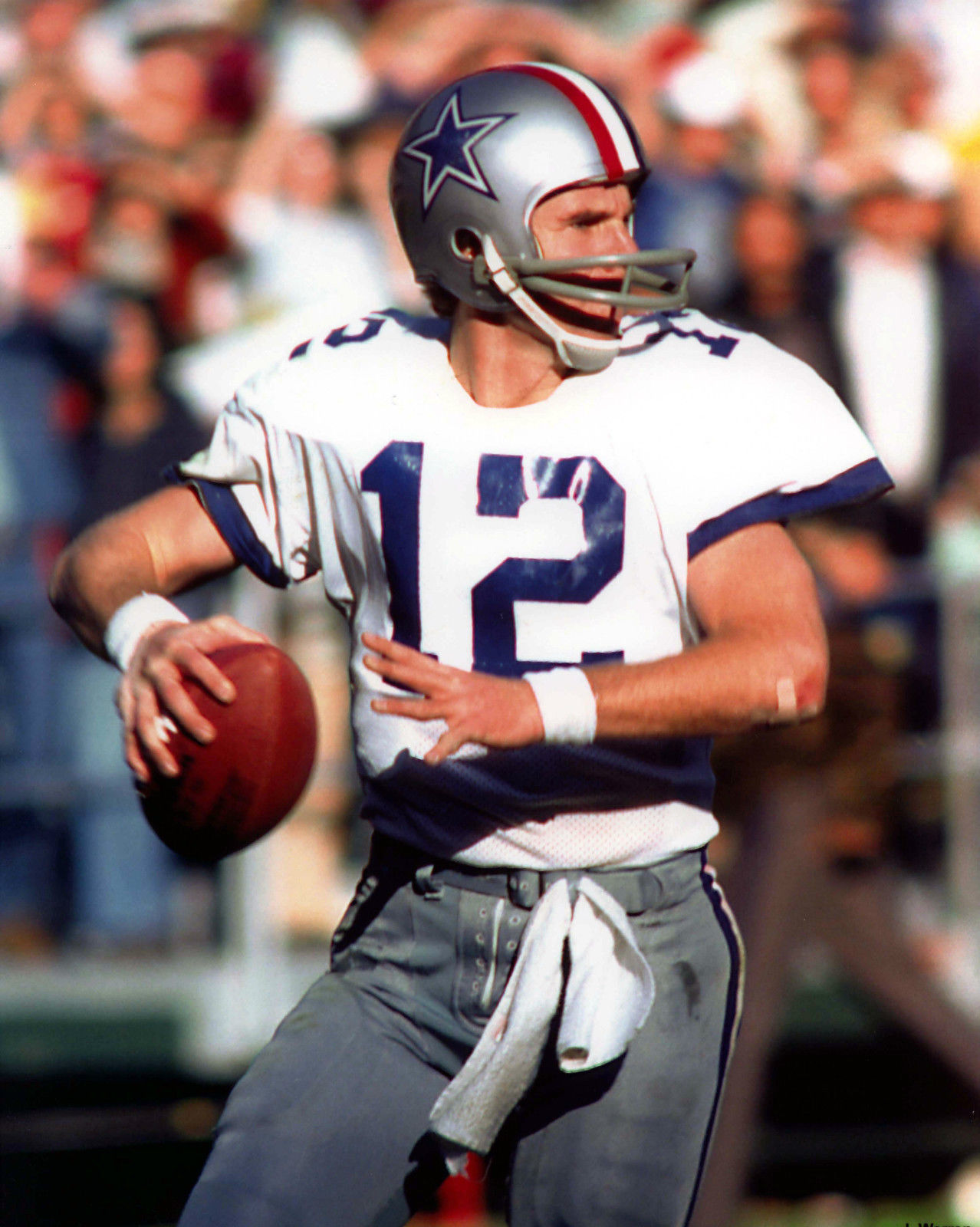
Roger Staubach's #12 was retired by the Naval Academy in 1965

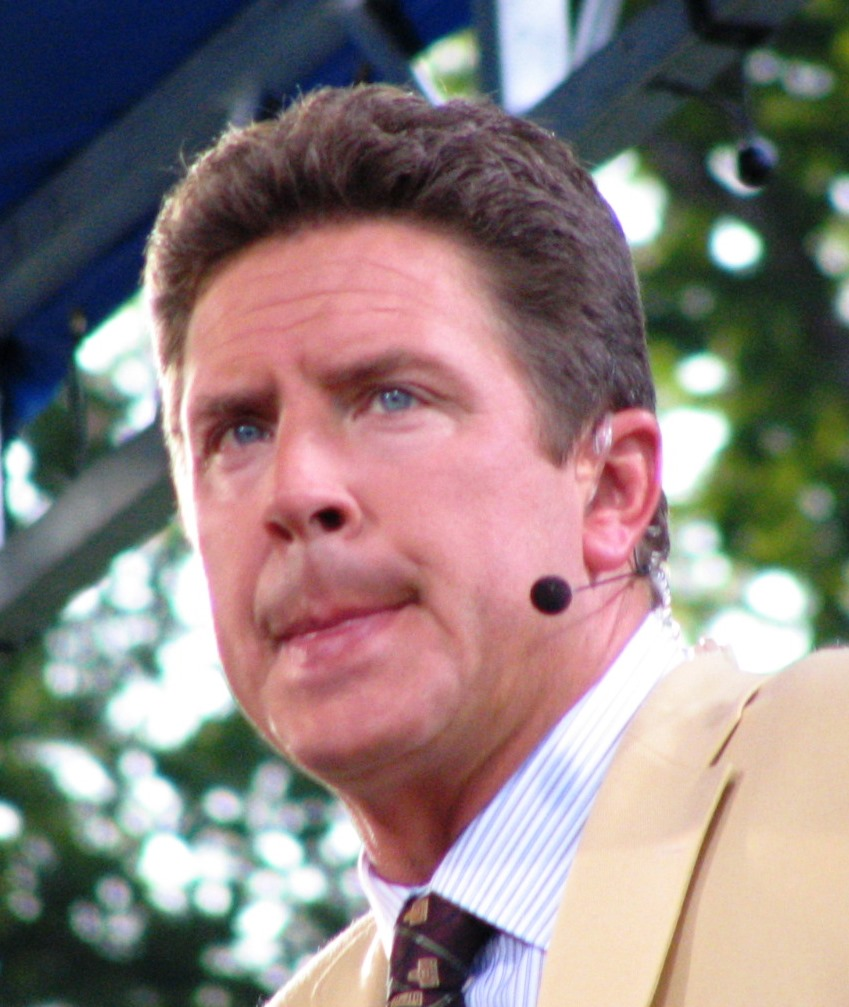
Dan Marino's #13 was retired by Pittsburgh

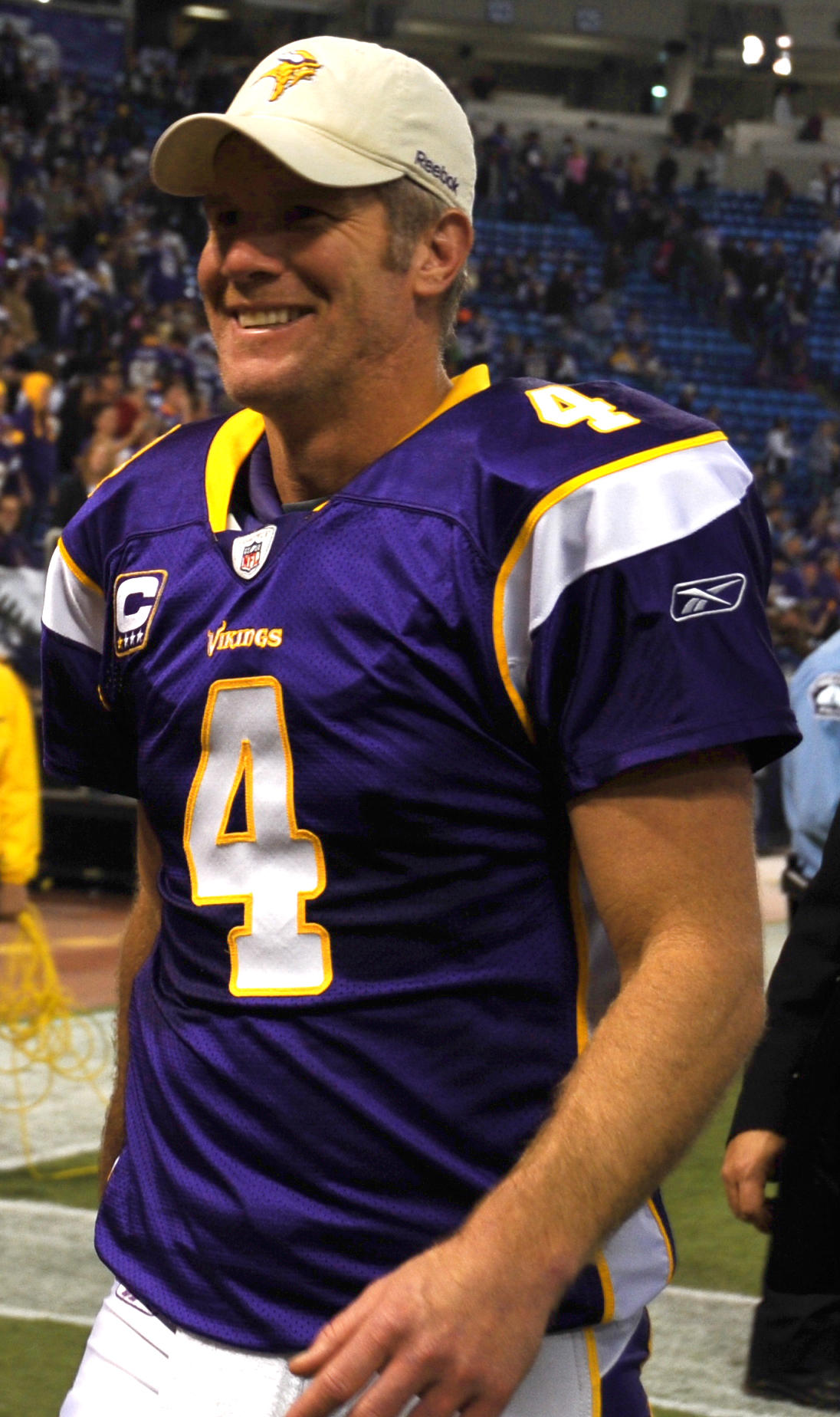
Brett Favre's #4, retired by Southern Miss in 2015

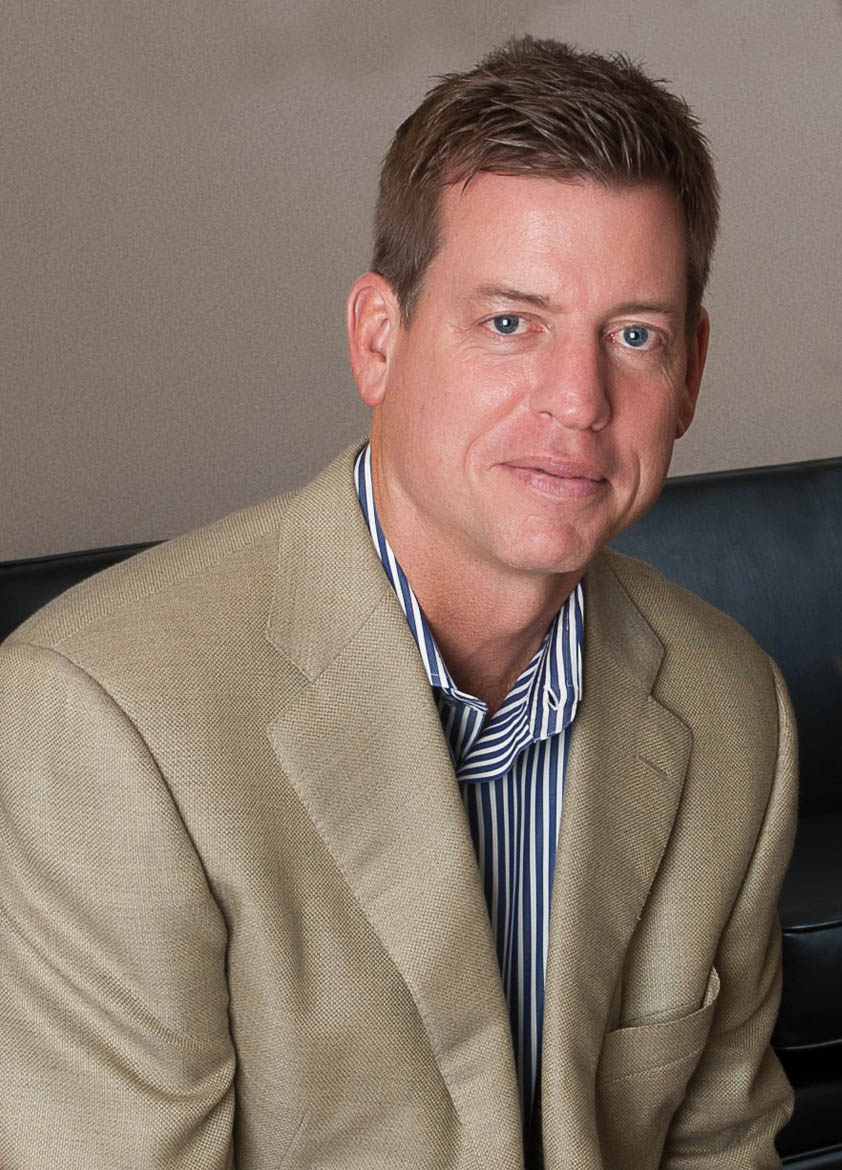
Troy Aikman's #8, retired by UCLA

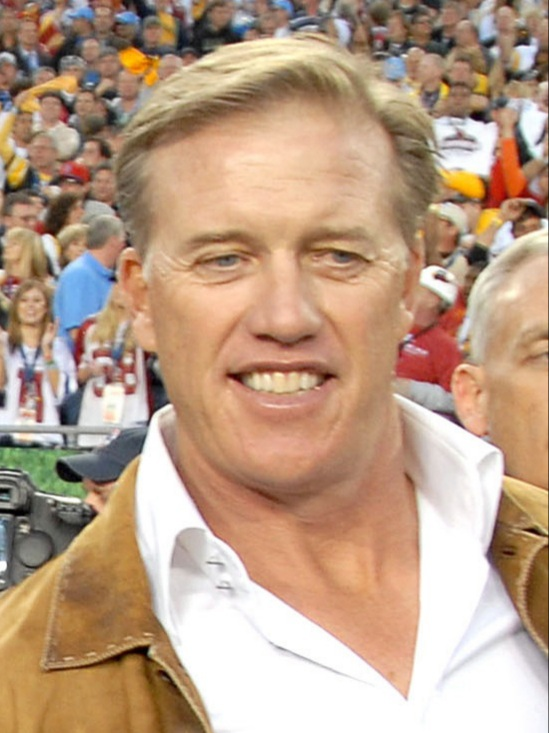
John Elway has his #7 retired by Stanford

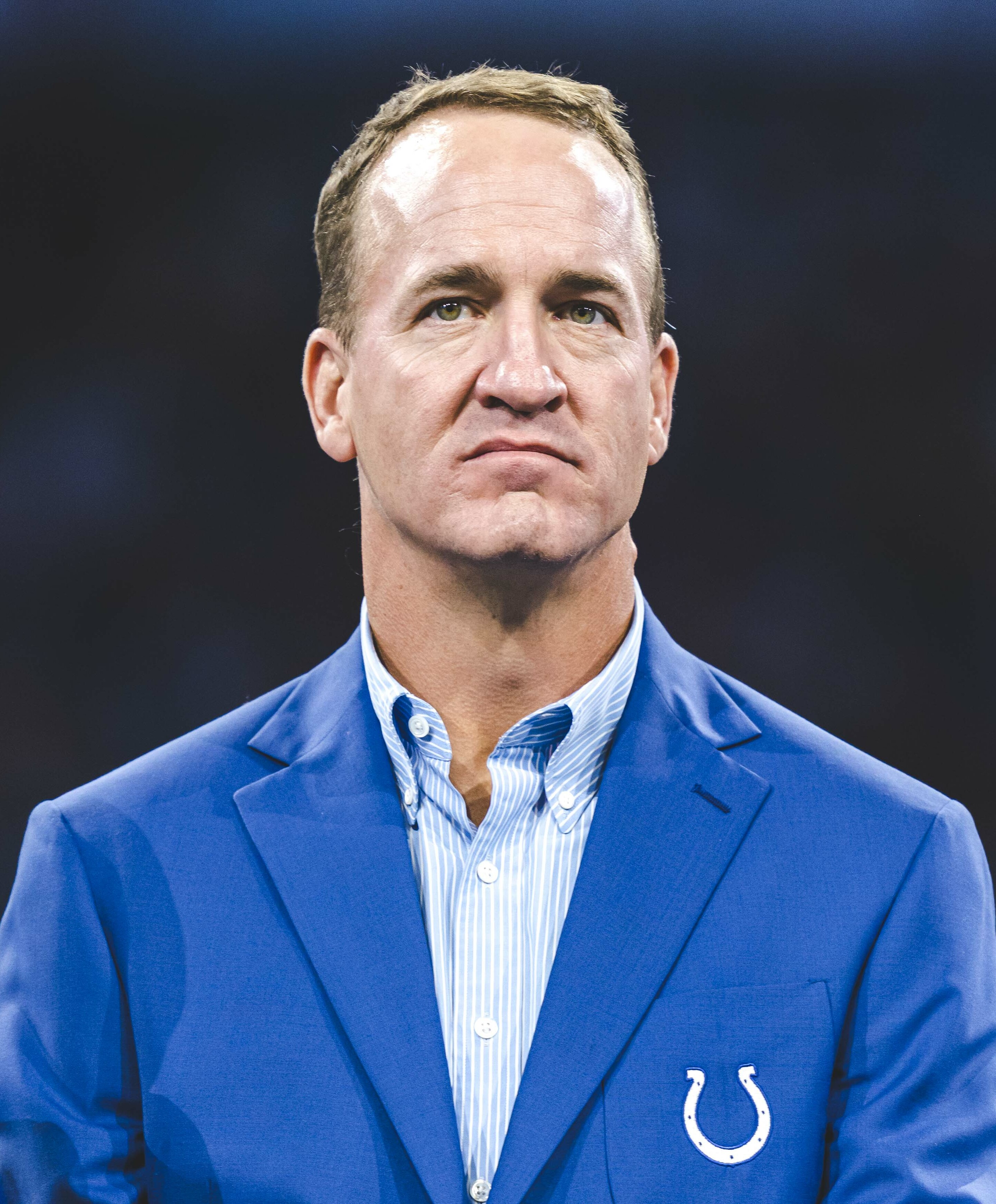
Peyton Manning's #16 was retired by Tennessee in 2005

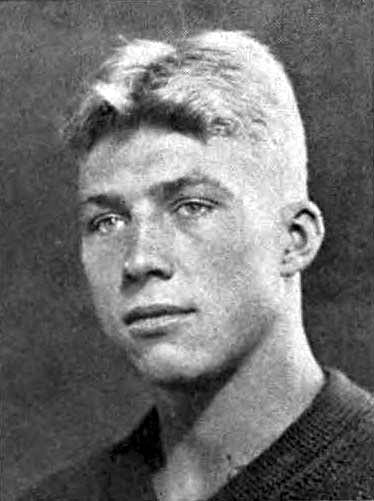
Michigan retired #11 in honor of Whitey Wistert (photo) and his two brothers

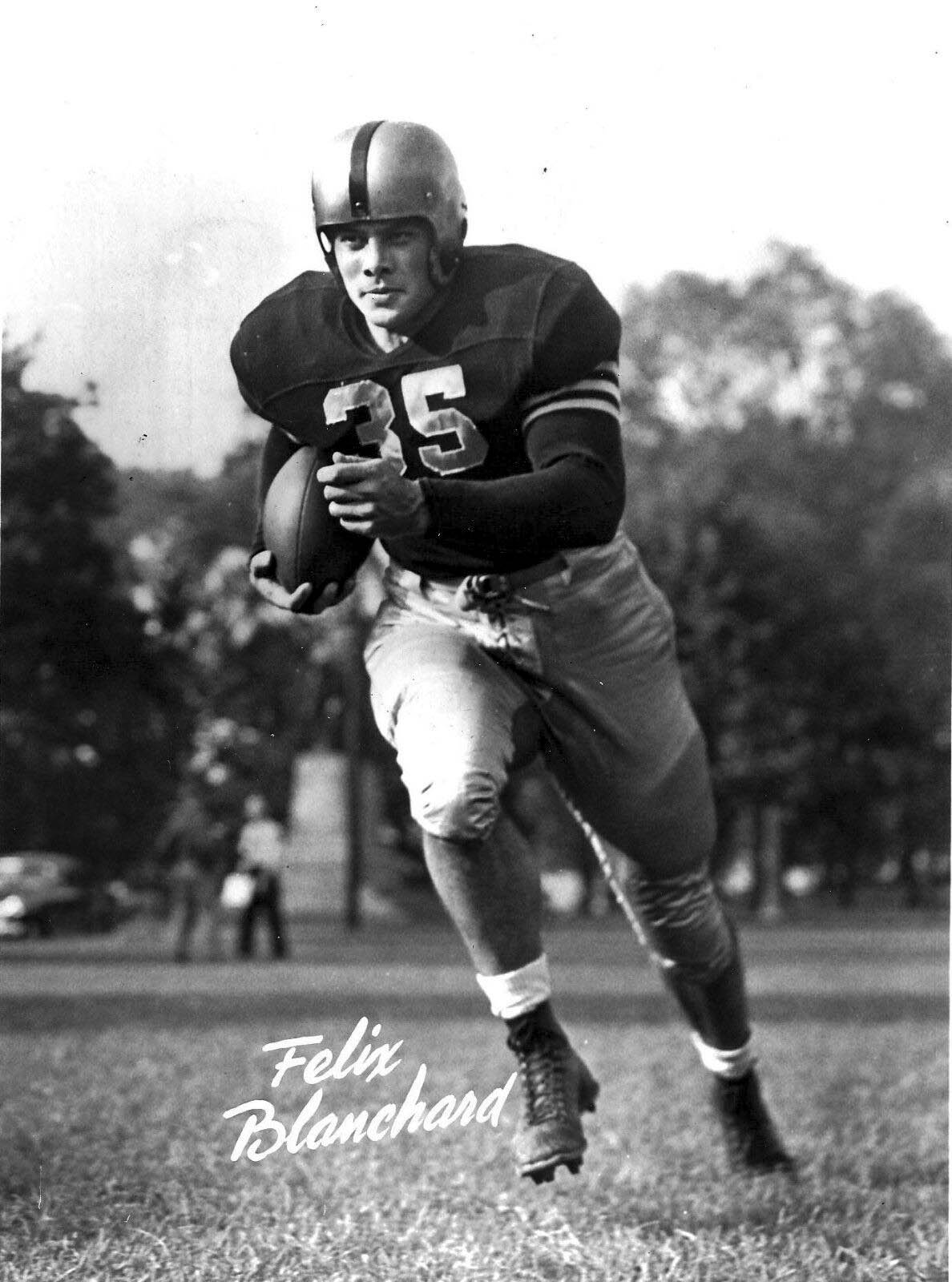
Doc Blanchard's #35, retired by Army

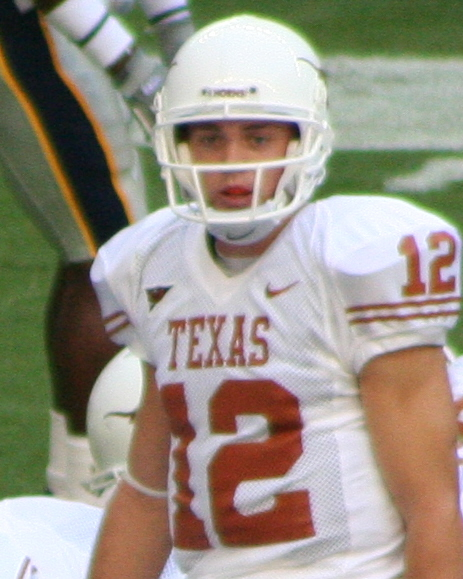
Colt McCoy's #12, retired by the Texas Longhorns

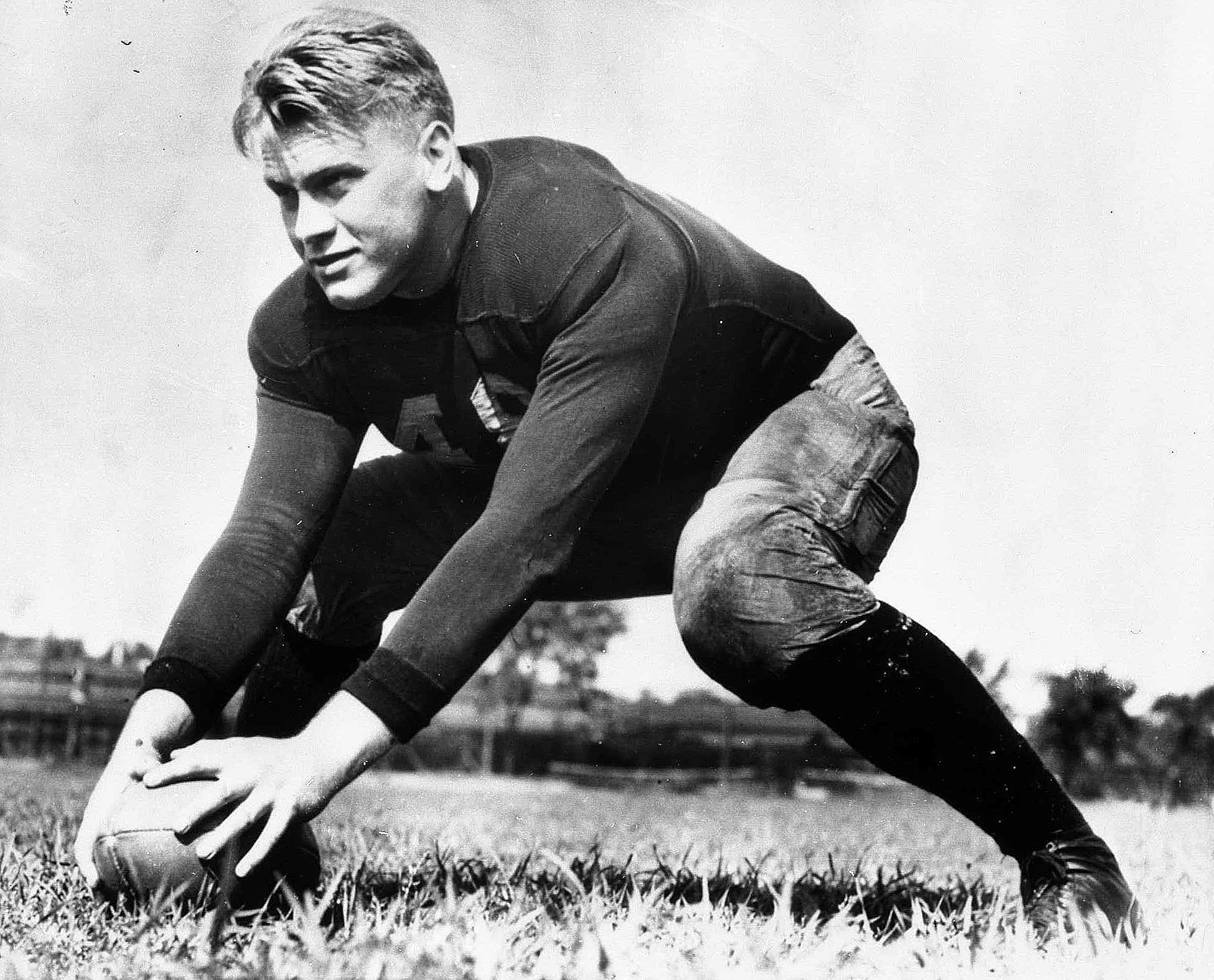
Gerald Ford with Michigan in 1933. His number 48 was retired by the program

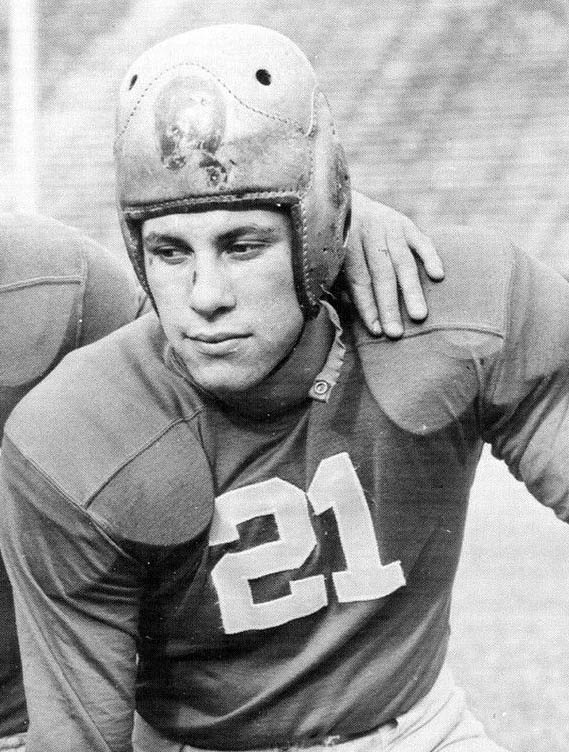
Frank Sinkwich's #21, retired by Georgia

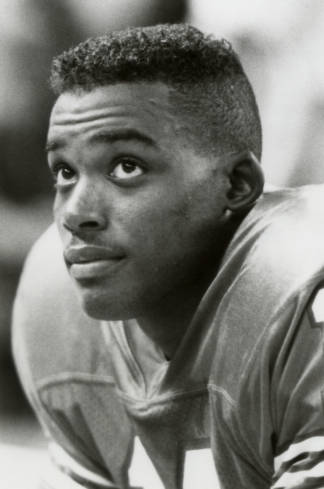
Andre Ware's #11, retired by Houston

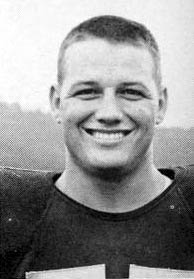
Sam Huff's #75 was retired by West Virginia in 2005

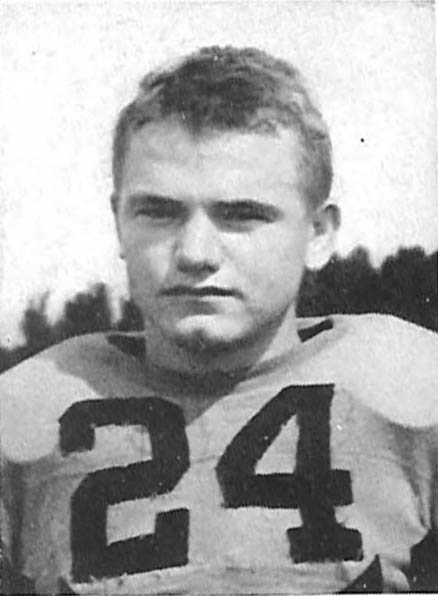
Nile Kinnick's #24, retired by Iowa

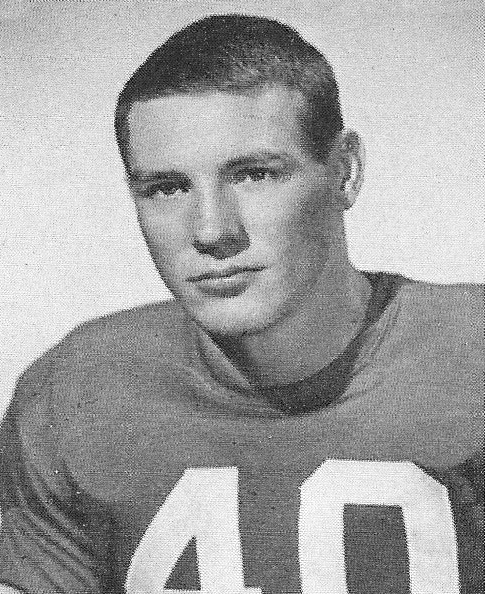
Howard Cassady's #40 was retired by Ohio State

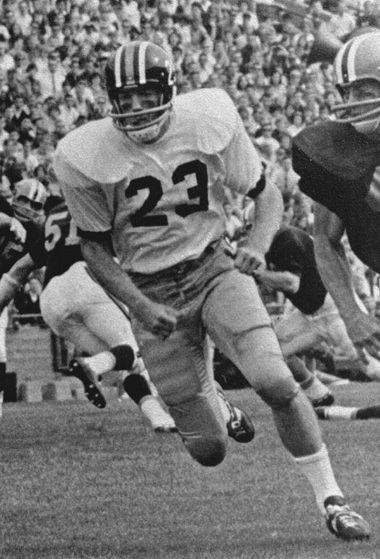
Missouri retired #23 in honor of Roger Wehrli (photo) and Johnny Roland

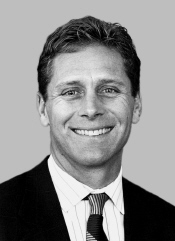
Steve Largent has his #83 retired by Tulsa

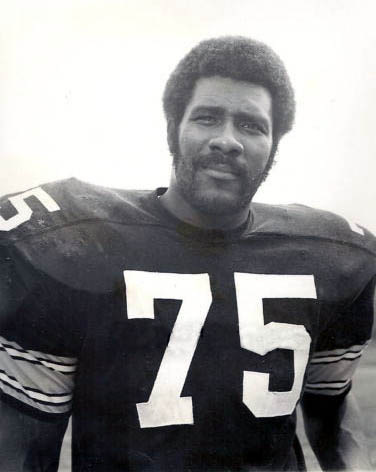
Joe Greene's #75, retired by North Texas

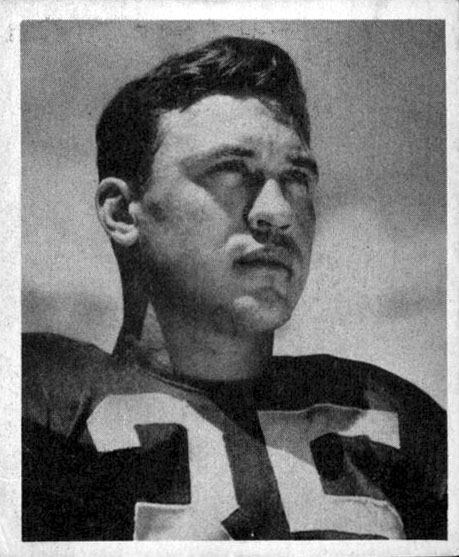
Bill Dudley's #35 was retired by Virginia

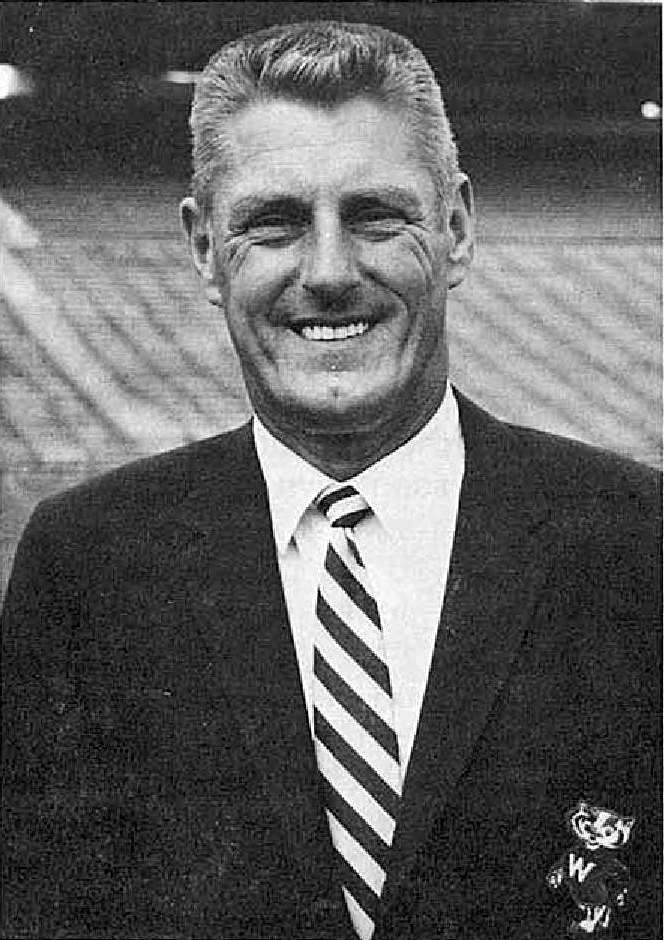
Elroy Hirsch's #40 was retired by Wisconsin in 2005

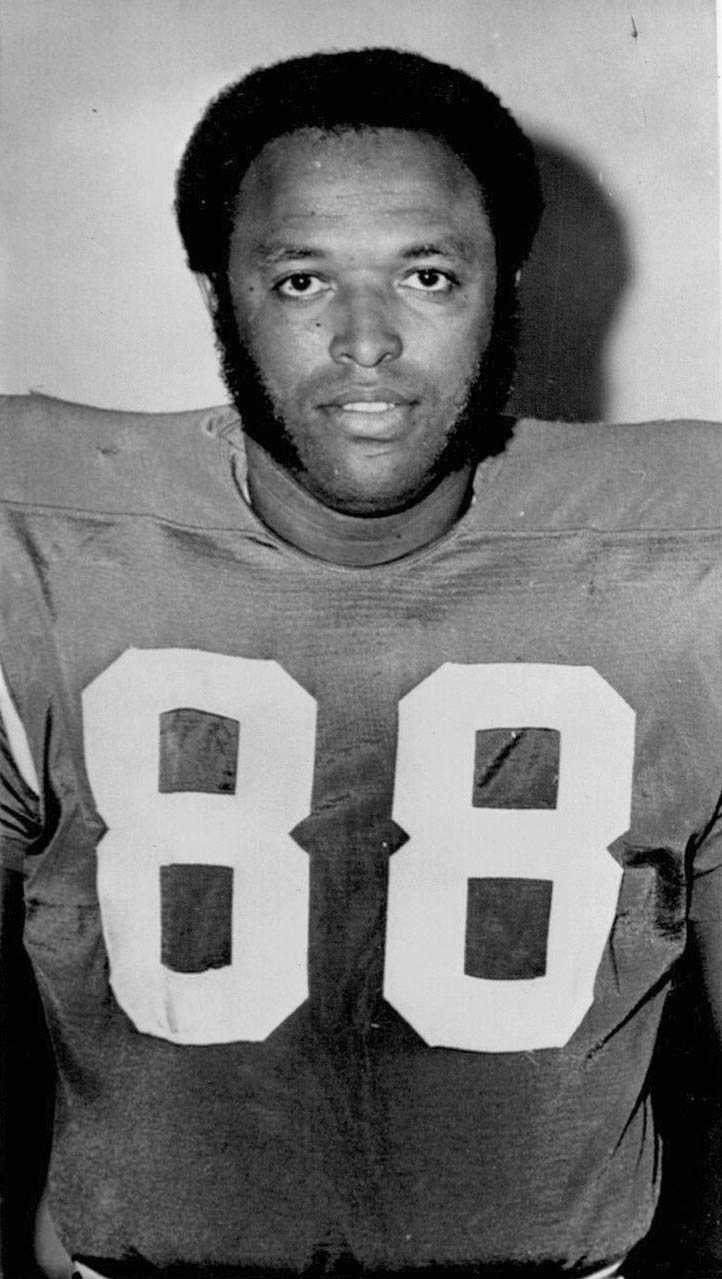
John Mackey's #88, retired by Syracuse

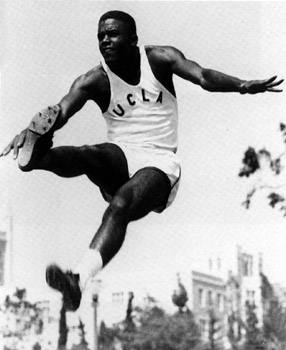
Jackie Robinson's #42 was retired across all UCLA sports in 2014

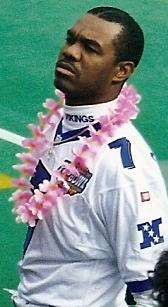
Randall Cunningham's #17, the only number retired by UNLV

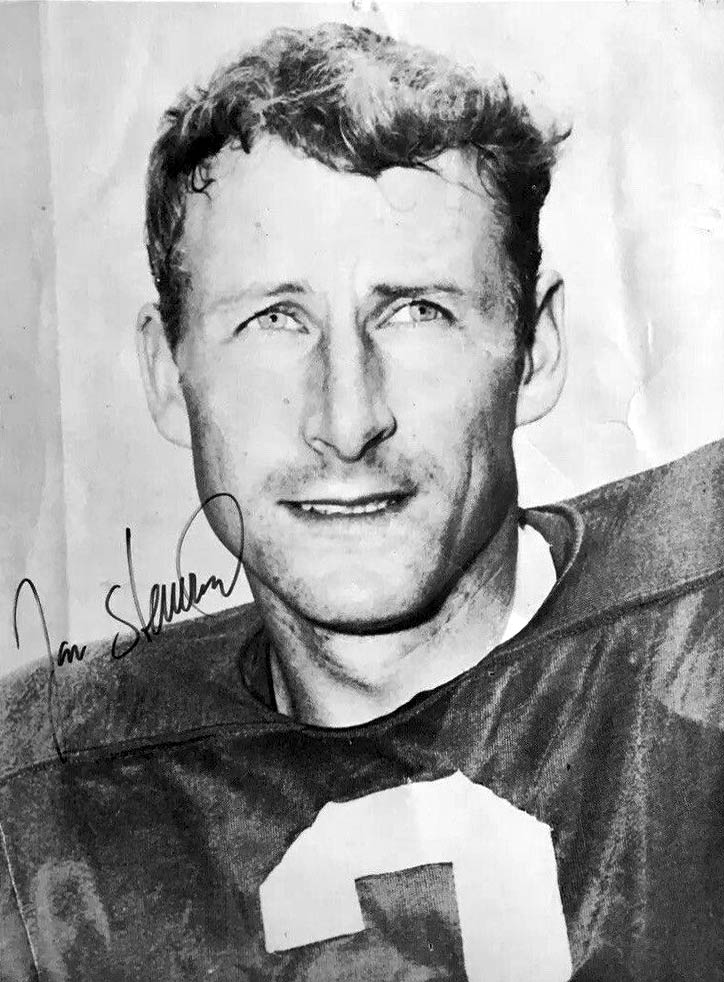
Jan Stenerud's #78 was retired by Montana State

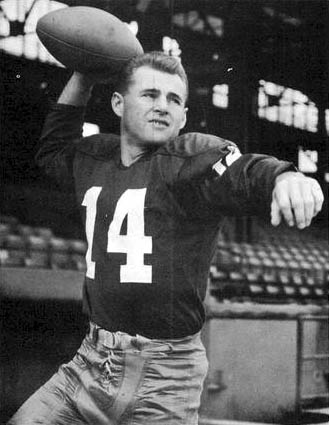
Eddie LeBaron's #40 was retired by Pacific

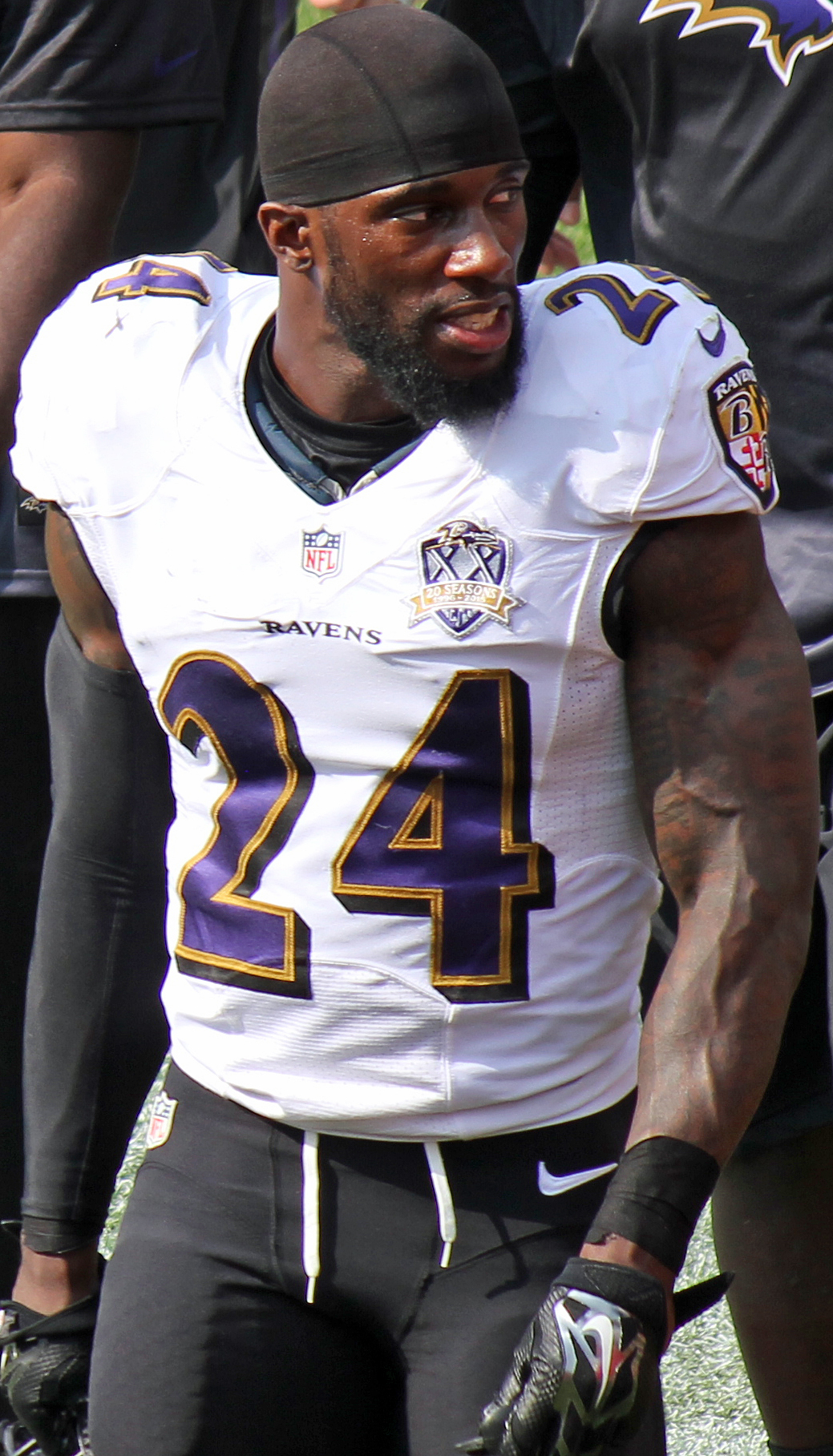
Kyle Arrington's #24, retired by Hofstra

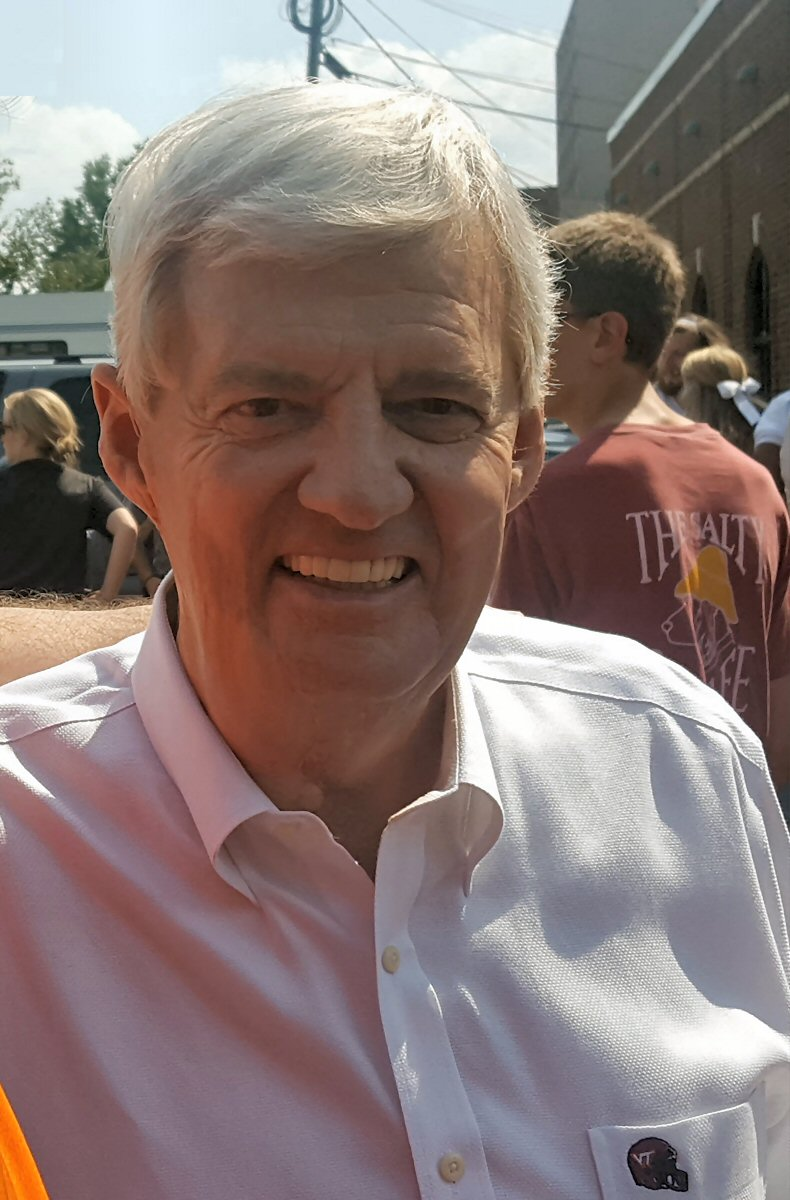
Frank Beamers's #25 was retired by Virginia Tech in 2002

Team	No.	Player	Tenure	Year retired	Ref.
Akron	89	Chris Angeloff (Note: Posthumous honor.)	1974–1975	1975	
Alabama A&M	22	John Stallworth	1971–1974	1974	
Alabama A&M	55	Robert Mathis	1999–2002	2012	
Appalachian State	14	Armanti Edwards	2006–2009	2023	
Appalachian State	23	John Settle	1983–1986	1986	
Appalachian State	32	Dexter Coakley	1993–1996	2005	
Appalachian State	38	Dino Hackett	1982–1985	2005	
Appalachian State	71	Larry Hand	1960–1964	2006	
Arizona State	11	Danny White	1971–1973		
Arizona State	27	Bobby Mulgado	1954–1957		
Arizona State	33	Wilford White	1947–1950		
Arizona State	40	Mike Haynes	1971–1975		
Arizona State	42	Pat Tillman	1994–1997	2004	
Arkansas	12	Clyde Scott	1946–1949	1949	
Arkansas	77	Brandon Burlsworth	1994–1998	1999	
Army	24	Pete Dawkins	1956–1958	2008	
Army	35	Doc Blanchard	1944–1946	2009	
Army	41	Glenn Davis	1943–1946	2005	
Army	61	Joe Steffy	1945–1947	2009	
Auburn	2	Cam Newton	2010	2025	
Auburn	7	Pat Sullivan	1969–1971		
Auburn	34	Bo Jackson	1982–1985		
Auburn	88	Terry Beasley	1969–1971		
Austin Peay	30	John Ogles	1963–1966		
Austin Peay	84	Harold Roberts	1967–1970		
Boise State	12	Jim McMillan	1971–1974	1978	
Boston College	22	Doug Flutie	1981–1984		
Boston College	68	Mike Ruth	1982–1985		
Bowling Green	29	Paul Miles	1970–1973		
BYU	6	Marc Wilson	1975–1979	2017	
BYU	6	Robbie Bosco	1981–1985	2017	
BYU	6	Luke Staley	1999–2001	2017	
BYU	8	Steve Young	1980–1983	2003	
BYU	9	Jim McMahon	1977–1981	2014	
BYU	14	Gifford Nielsen	1973–1977	2007	
BYU	14	Ty Detmer	1987–1991	2007	
BYU	40	Eldon Fortie	1960–1962	1963	
BYU	81	Marion Probert	1952–1954	1977	
Cal Poly	45	Osbaldo Orozco	1996–1999		
Cal Poly	74	John Madden	1957–1958	2026	
California	12	Joe Roth	1975–1976	1977	
Central Michigan	62	Jim Podoley	1952–1956		
Clemson	4	Steve Fuller (Note: The number was brought out of retirement in 2014 to be worn by quarterback Deshaun Watson, with Fuller's permission.)	1975–1978	1979	
Clemson	28	C. J. Spiller (Note: In 2016, Spiller gave his permission to bring the number out of retirement to be worn by Tavien Feaster.)	2006–2009	2010	
Clemson	66	Banks McFadden	1937–1939	1987	
Colorado	2	Shedeur Sanders	2023–2024	2025	
Colorado	11	Bobby Anderson (Note: In 2020, Colorado athletic director Rick George announced plans to re-issue uniform numbers 11, 24, and 67 with the support of the noted players (or their families). Contemporary uniforms issued with those numbers will include a commemorative patch. Nonetheless, as of 2023 season, no player has used any of those numbers since the announcement. Uniform number 19 will remain unused for 19 years, after which it may be re-issued.)	1967–1969	1969	
Colorado	12	Travis Hunter	2023–2024	2025	
Colorado	19	Rashaan Salaam	1992–1994	2017	
Colorado	24	Byron White	1935–1937	1937	
Colorado	67	Joe Romig	1959–1961	1961	
Colorado State	14	John Mosley	1939–1943	2024	
Colorado State	21	Eddie Hanna	1947–1949	1949	
Colorado State	48	Thurman McGraw	1946–1949		
Drake	43	Johnny Bright (Note: Bright is regarded as the greatest football player ever at Drake. At the institution, Bright also competed in basketball and track.)	1949–1951	2006	
East Carolina	16	Robert Farris	1965–1967		
East Carolina	18	Norman Swindell	1963–1965		
East Carolina	29	James Speight	1955–1959		
East Carolina	36	Roger Thrift	1949–1950		
Eastern Illinois	17	Tony Romo	1999–2002	2009	
Eastern Illinois	18	Sean Payton	1983–1986	2010	
Eastern Washington	71	Michael Roos	2001–2004	2009	
Eastern Washington	84	Bob Picard	1968–1969, 1971–1972	2003	
Florida State	2	Deion Sanders	1985–1988	2011	
Florida State	9	Peter Warrick	1995–1999	2018	
Florida State	10	Derrick Brooks	1991–1994	2010	
Florida State	16	Chris Weinke	1997–2000	2017	
Florida State	17	Charlie Ward	1997–1999	2025	
Florida State	25	Fred Biletnikoff	1962–1964	1964	
Florida State	27	Terrell Buckley	1989–1991	2011	
Florida State	28	Warrick Dunn	1993–1996	2015	
Florida State	34	Ron Sellers	1966–1969	1969	
Florida State	38	Sebastian Janikowski	1997–1999	2026	
Florida State	50	Ron Simmons	1977–1980	1988	
Florida State	55	Marvin Jones	1990–1992	2015	
Fresno State	4	Derek Carr	2009–2013	2017	
Fresno State	8	David Carr	1997–2001	2007	
Fresno State	9	Kevin Sweeney	1983–1986		
Fresno State	12	Trent Dilfer	1991–1993		
Fresno State	14	Vince Petrucci	1976–1978		
Fresno State	15	Davante Adams	2011–2013	2022	
Fresno State	21	Dale Messer	1958–1960		
Fresno State	22	Lorenzo Neal	1990–1992	2022	
Fresno State	83	Henry Ellard	1979–1982		
Georgia	21	Frank Sinkwich	1941–1943	1943	
Georgia	34	Herschel Walker	1980–1982	1985	
Georgia	40	Theron Sapp	1955–1958	1959	
Georgia	62	Charley Trippi	1942, 1945–1946	1947	
Georgia Southern	3	Adrian Peterson	1998–2001		
Georgia Southern	8	Tracy Ham	1982–1986		
Georgia Tech	19	Clint Castleberry	1942		
Hawaii	15	Colt Brennan	2005–2007	2021	
Hawaii	32	Tom Kaulukukui	1934–1937		
Hofstra
Hofstra	3	Wayne Chrebet	1991–1994		
Hofstra	33	Walter Kohanowich	1948–1952		
Hofstra	74	Dave Fiore	1992–1995		
Hofstra	77	John Schmitt	1961–1963		
Hofstra	89	Marques Colston	2001–2005		
Houston	7	David Klingler	1988–1991	2016	
Houston	7	Case Keenum	2006–2011	2016	
Houston	11	Andre Ware	1987–1989		
Houston	23	Elmo Wright	1968–1970	2025	
Houston	78	Wilson Whitley	1973–1976		
Idaho	9	Ken Hobart	1980–1983		
Idaho	17	John Friesz	1986–1989	2006	
Idaho	53	Wayne Walker	1955–1957		
Idaho	56	John Yarno	1973–1976	1977	
Idaho	64	Jerry Kramer	1955–1957	1963	
Idaho State	41	Jared Allen	2000–2003		
Illinois	50	Dick Butkus	1962–1964	2003	
Illinois	77	Red Grange	1923–1925	2003	
Indiana	32	Anthony Thompson	1986–1989		
Indiana State	26	Vincent Allen	1973–1977	2025	
Iowa	24	Nile Kinnick (Note: Kinnick died during a training flight while serving as a United States Navy aviator in World War II.)	1936–1939		
Iowa	62	Cal Jones	1952–1955		
Iowa State	30	Mike Cox	1963–1964	1964	
Indiana	32	Anthony Thompson	1986–1989		
Kansas	21	John Hadl	1959–1961		
Kansas	42	Ray Evans (Note: Evans also has his #15 retired from the Kansas basketball team, being the only athlete in the history of the program to have such honor.)	1941–1942, 1946–1947		
Kansas	48	Gale Sayers	1962–1964	1989	´
Kansas State	11	Lynn Dickey	1968–1970		
Kansas State	11	Steve Grogan	1972–1974		
Kent State	9	Josh Cribbs	2001–2004	2010	
Kent State	40	Eric Wilkerson	1985–1988		
Kent State	79	Jim Corrigall	1967–1969	1969	
Kent State	99	Jack Lambert	1971–1973	1977	
Kentucky	21	Calvin Bird	1958–1960	1997	
Kentucky	22	Mark Higgs	1984–1987	1997	
Lafayette	53	Fred Kirby	1939–1941	2011	
Liberty (Note: Liberty also retired "HC" in honor of Sam Rutigliano, who served as the head football coach from 1989 to 1999. It is not a number, so no player is able to wear it even is officially retired.)	23	Rashad Jennings	2006–2008	2020	
Liberty	71	Jerry Falwell (Note: Falwell never played for the football program, but he founded the university in 1971. As such, a "71" jersey was hung over the press box suite, with the number being retired across all Liberty sports teams.)	—N/a	2006	
Liberty	83	Kelvin Edwards	1982–1985	2019	
Liberty	86	Eric Green	1985–1989	2008	
Lincoln (MO)	20	Lemar Parrish	1966–1969		
Louisville	8	Lamar Jackson	2015–2017	2021	
Louisville	16	Johnny Unitas	1951–1955	2003	
LSU	20	Billy Cannon	1957–1959	1960	
LSU	21	Jerry Stovall	1960–1962	2018	
LSU	37	Tommy Casanova	1969–1971	2009	
Marshall	72	Frank Gatski	1940–1941	2005	
Miami (FL)	10	George Mira	1961–1963	1997	
Miami (FL)	14	Vinny Testaverde	1982–1986	1997	
Miami (FL)	42	Jim Dooley	1949–1951	1997	
Miami (FL)	89	Ted Hendricks	1966–1968	1997	
Miami (OH)	7	Ben Roethlisberger	2000–2003	2007	
Miami (OH)	40	Bob Hitchens	1971–1973		
Miami (OH)	42	John Pont	1949–1951		
Memphis	8	Charles Greenhill	1983		
Memphis	20	DeAngelo Williams	2002–2005		
Memphis	30	Dave Casinelli	1960–1963		
Memphis	59	Danton Barto	1990–1993	2021	
Memphis	64	John Bramlett	1959–1962		
Memphis	79	Harry Schuh	1962–1964		
Memphis	83	Isaac Bruce	1992–1993		
Michigan	11	Whitey Wistert	1931–1933	1949	
Michigan	11	Al Wistert	1940–1942	1949	
Michigan	11	Alvin Wistert	1947–1949	1949	
Michigan	21	Desmond Howard	1989–1991	2015	
Michigan	47	Bennie Oosterbaan	1925–1927	1927	
Michigan	48	Gerald Ford	1932–1934	1994	
Michigan	87	Ron Kramer	1954–1956	1956	
Michigan	98	Tom Harmon	1938–1940	1940	
Michigan State	26	Clinton Jones	1964–1966	2015	
Michigan State	46	John Hannah (Note: Hannah was not a player, but gave Michigan State University 46 years of service, 28 of them as president of the institution. He is also the longest-serving president of MSU, being in office from 1941 to 1969.)	—N/a	1969	
Michigan State	48	Percy Snow	1986–1989	2013	
Michigan State	78	Don Coleman	1949–1951	1951	
Michigan State	90	George Webster	1964–1966	1967	
Michigan State	95	Bubba Smith	1964–1966	2006	
Middle Tennessee	14	Teddy Morris	1962–1965	1965	
Middle Tennessee	20	Kevin Byard	2012–2015	2022	
Minnesota	10	Paul Giel	1951–1953	1991	
Minnesota	54	Bruce Smith	1939–1941	1977	
Minnesota	72	Bronko Nagurski	1927–1929	1979	
Mississippi Valley State	18	Parnell Dickinson	1972–1975	1976	
Missouri	23	Johnny Roland	1962, 1964–1965		
Missouri	23	Roger Wehrli	1966–1968		
Missouri	27	Brock Olivo	1994–1997		
Missouri	37	Bob Steuber	1940–1943		
Missouri	42	Darold Jenkins	1939–1941		
Missouri	44	Paul Christman	1938–1940		
Missouri	83	Kellen Winslow	1975–1978		
Missouri Southern	9	Rod Smith	1988–1993		
Montana	15	Dave Dickenson	1992–1995		
Montana	22	Terry Dillon	1960–1962		
Montana State	21	Don Hass	1964–1966		
Montana State	52	Sonny Holland	1956–1959	1959	
Montana State	77	Bill Kollar	1971–1973		
Montana State	78	Jan Stenerud	1963–1965	1984	
Murray State	10	Larry Tillman	1966–1969	1969	
Murray State	11	Michael Proctor	1986–1989	1993	
Navy	12	Roger Staubach	1961–1963	1965	
Navy	19	Keenan Reynolds	2012–2015	2016	
Navy	27	Joe Bellino	1958–1960	1960	
Navy	30	Napoleon McCallum	1981–1985		
NC State	17	Philip Rivers	2000–2003	2003	
NC State	18	Roman Gabriel	1958–1961	1962	
NC State	23	Ted Brown	1975–1978	1978	
NC State	40	Dick Christy	1954–1957	1997	
NC State	51	Jim Ritcher	1976–1979	1987	
NC State	63	Bill Yoest	1970–1973	2003	
NC State	77	Dennis Byrd	1964–1967		
NC State	81	Torry Holt	1995–1998	1999	
Nebraska	60	Tom Novak	1946–1949	1949	
Nebraska	64	Bob Brown	1961–1963	2004	
Nevada	27	Frank Hawkins	1977–1980		
Nevada	41	Marion Motley	1940–1942		
New Mexico
New Mexico	42	Bobby Santiago (Note: Although the No. 42 and 44 were brought out of retirement briefly in the 2021 season, they have been retired again and currently no players wear them.)	1959–1962		
New Mexico	43	Don Perkins	1957–1959		
New Mexico	44	Brian Urlacher	1996–1999	2013	
North Carolina	22	Charlie Justice	1946–1949		
North Carolina	46	Bill Sutherland	1946		
North Carolina	50	Art Weiner	1946–1949		
North Carolina	59	Andy Bershak	1935–1937		
North Carolina	99	George Barclay	1932–1934		
North Dakota	41	Dave Osborn	1962–1964		
North Texas	28	Abner Haynes	1957–1959		
North Texas	33	Ray Renfro	1949–1950	2000	
North Texas	55	Richard Gill	1968–1969	1971	
North Texas	75	Joe Greene	1966–1969	1981	
Ohio State	22	Les Horvath	1940–1942, 1944	2000	
Ohio State	27	Eddie George	1992–1995	2001	
Ohio State	31	Vic Janowicz	1949–1951	2000	
Ohio State	40	Howard Cassady	1952–1955	2000	
Ohio State	45	Archie Griffin	1972–1975	1999	
Ohio State	47	Chic Harley	1916–1917, 1919	2004	
Ohio State	99	Bill Willis (Note: In 2020, the NCAA approved the use of the No. 0. In order to further pay tribute to Bill Willis, Coach Day decided to start a new tradition and choose the player who will wear the number each season.)	1942–1944	2007	
Oklahoma State	21	Barry Sanders	1986–1988		
Oklahoma State	34	Thurman Thomas	1984–1987		
Oklahoma State	43	Terry Miller	1974–1977		
Oklahoma State	55	Bob Fenimore	1943–1946		
Ole Miss	10	Eli Manning	1999–2003	2021	
Ole Miss	18	Archie Manning	1968–1970		
Ole Miss	38	Chucky Mullins (Note: Retired from football after a severe injury left him a quadriplegic during a game against Vanderbilt in 1989.)	1988–1989		
Ole Miss	74	Ben Williams (Note: Regarded as the first black player in the program's history.)	1972–1975	2022	
Oregon State	11	Terry Baker	1959–1962		
Penn State	22	John Cappelletti	1970–1973	2013	
Pacific	22	Dick Bass	1955–1958	1984	
Pacific	39	Willard Harrell	1971–1974	1986	
Pacific	40	Eddie LeBaron	1946–1949	1950	
Pacific	41	Eddie Macon	1949–1951	2008	
Pittsburgh	1	Larry Fitzgerald	2002–2003	2013	
Pittsburgh	13	Dan Marino	1979–1982	1983	
Pittsburgh	33	Tony Dorsett	1973–1976	1976	
Pittsburgh	42	Marshall Goldberg	1936–1938	1997	
Pittsburgh	65	Joe Schmidt	1950–1952	1997	
Pittsburgh	73	Mark May	1977–1980	2001	
Pittsburgh	75	Jim Covert	1979–1983	2015	
Pittsburgh	79	Bill Fralic	1981–1984	1984	
Pittsburgh	89	Mike Ditka	1958–1960	1997	
Pittsburgh	97	Aaron Donald	2010–2013	2025	
Pittsburgh	99	Hugh Green	1977–1980	1980	
Portland State	11	Neil Lomax	1977–1980		
Portland State	18	Peter Stott	1990–1992	2014	
Rhode Island	12	Tom Ehrhardt	1983–1985	1996	
Rutgers	52	Eric LeGrand	2008–2010	2013	
San Diego State	8	Todd Santos	1984–1987		
San Diego State	25	Haven Moses	1966–1967		
San Diego State	28	Willie Buchanon	1970–1971		
San Diego State	28	Marshall Faulk	1991–1993		
San José State	52	Dave Chaney	1970–1972	2019	
Savannah State	2	Shannon Sharpe	1986–1989	2009	
South Carolina	2	Sterling Sharpe	1983, 1985–1987		
South Carolina	37	Steve Wadiak	1948–1951		
South Carolina	38	George Rogers	1977–1980		
South Carolina	56	Mike Johnson	1964		
Southeast Missouri State	67	Mike Wood	1974–1977	1978	
Southern Miss	4	Brett Favre	1987–1990	2015	
Southern Miss	10	Reggie Collier	1980–1982	2008	
Southern Miss	44	Ray Guy	1970–1972		
Stanford	1	Ernie Nevers	1921–1924		
Stanford	7	John Elway	1979–1982	2013	
Stanford	16	Jim Plunkett	1968–1970		
Syracuse	5	Donovan McNabb	1995–1998	2013	
Syracuse	9	Don McPherson	1984–1987	2013	
Syracuse	39	Larry Csonka	1965–1967	2007	
Syracuse	44	(various) (Note: The complete list of players who wore number 44, by chronological order: Gifford Zimmerman, Charles Roberts, Clarence Taylor, Don Baldwin, Richard Fishel, Henry Merz, Hamilton Watt, Francis Mullins, Stanley Stanislay, Benjamin DeYoung, Francis Mazejko, Richard Ransom, J. O'Brien, Robert Eberling, Jim Brown, Thomas Stephens, Ernie Davis, William Schoonover, Floyd Little, Richard Panczyszyn, Mandel Robinson, Glenn Moore, Michael Owens, Terry Richardson, and Rob Konrad.)	1921–1998	2005	
Syracuse	47	Joe Morris	1978–1981	2018	
Syracuse	72	Tim Green	1982–1986	2019	
Syracuse	88	John Mackey	1960–1962	2007	
TCU	5	LaDainian Tomlinson	1997–2000	2005	
TCU	8	Davey O'Brien	1935–1938	1939	
TCU	45	Sammy Baugh	1934–1936	1993	
Tennessee	16	Peyton Manning	1995–1997	2005	
Tennessee	32	Billy Nowling (Note: Died in service during World War II. They were honored as "Vol Legends" prior to the game vs. Air Force on Sep 9, 2006.)	1940–1942	1946	
Tennessee	45	Johnny Majors	1954–1956	2012	
Tennessee	49	Rudy Klarer	1941–1942	1946	
Tennessee	61	Willis Tucker	1939–1940	1946	
Tennessee	62	Clyde Fuson	1942	1946	
Tennessee	91	Doug Atkins	1950–1952	2005	
Tennessee	92	Reggie White	1980–1983	2005	
Texas	10	Vince Young	2003–2005		
Texas	12	Colt McCoy	2006–2009		
Texas	20	Earl Campbell	1974–1977		
Texas	22	Bobby Layne	1944–1947		
Texas	34	Ricky Williams	1995–1998		
Texas	60	Tommy Nobis	1963–1965		
Texas Tech	44	Donny Anderson	1963–1965		
Texas Tech	55	E. J. Holub	1958–1960	1960	
Texas Tech	81	Dave Parks	1961–1963		
Toledo	16	Chuck Ealey	1969–1971		
Toledo	18	Gene Swick	1972–1975		
Toledo	82	Mel Triplett	1951–1954		
Toledo	77	Mel Long	1969–1971		
Tulsa	14	Billy Anderson	1963–1964 (Note: He had previously played for SMU Mustangs (1960–1961).)	1995	
Tulsa	17	Jerry Rhome	1963–1964		
Tulsa	31	Ellis Jones	1942–1944		
Tulsa	36	Felto Prewitt	1943–1945		
Tulsa	45	Glenn Dobbs	1940–1942		
Tulsa	55	Jerry Ostroski	1988–1991	2018	
Tulsa	64	Marv Matuszak	1952		
Tulsa	81	Howard Twilley	1963–1965		
Tulsa	83	Steve Largent	1972–1975	2008	
UCLA	5	Kenny Easley	1978–1980		
UCLA	8	Troy Aikman	1986–1988	2014	
UCLA	13	Kenny Washington	1937–1939	1956	
UCLA	16	Gary Beban	1965–1967		
UCLA	34	Paul Cameron	1951–1953		
UCLA	38	Burr Baldwin	1944–1946		
UCLA	42	Jackie Robinson (Note: As a UCLA football player, Robinson wore No. 28; however, the school chose to retire No. 42, which became indelibly identified with him because it was the number he wore throughout his Hall of Fame baseball career with the Brooklyn Dodgers: this included him being the first African American player in the modern era of professional baseball.) (Note: Retired across all UCLA sports on November 22, 2014. Kenny Young, a linebacker who wore No. 42 as a freshman in the 2014 season, was allowed to continue wearing the number for the remainder of his UCLA career.)	1939–1940	2014	
UCLA	79	Jonathan Ogden	1993–1995	1997	
UCLA	80	Donn Moomaw	1950–1952		
UCLA	84	Jerry Robinson	1976–1978		
UNLV	12	Randall Cunningham	1981–1984	1984	
USC	3	Carson Palmer	1999–2002	2002	
USC	5	Reggie Bush	2003–2005	2024	
USC	11	Matt Leinart	2001–2005	2004	
USC	12	Charles White	1977–1979	1979	
USC	13	Caleb Williams	2022–2023	2024	
USC	20	Mike Garrett	1963–1965	1965	
USC	32	O. J. Simpson	1967–1968	1968	
USC	33	Marcus Allen	1978–1981	1981	
Utah	22	Ty Jordan	2020	2021	
Utah	22	Aaron Lowe	2019–2021	2021	
Virginia	12	Shawn Moore	1988–1990		
Virginia	24	Frank Quayle	1966–1968		
Virginia	35	Bill Dudley	1940–1942		
Virginia	48	Joe Palumbo	1949–1951		
Virginia	73	Jim Dombrowski	1982–1985		
Virginia	97	Gene Edmonds	1948–1949		
Virginia Tech	10	Frank Loria	1965–1967	1971	
Virginia Tech	25	Frank Beamer	1966–1968	2002	
Virginia Tech	73	Jim Pyne	1990–1993	1994	
Virginia Tech	78	Bruce Smith	1981–1984	1985	
Virginia Tech	84	Carroll Dale	1956–1959	1960	
Washington State
Washington State	7	Mel Hein	1927–1931		
Washington State	14	Jack Thompson	1974–1978		
Weber State	10	Jamie Martin	1989–1992	2014	
West Virginia	9	Pat White	2004–2008	2026	
West Virginia	9	Major Harris	1987–1989	2021	
West Virginia	21	Ira Rodgers	1915–1917, 1919	2010	
West Virginia	75	Sam Huff	1952–1955	2005	
West Virginia	77	Bruce Bosley	1952–1955	2016	
West Virginia	90	Darryl Talley	1979–1982	2021	
Western Michigan	44	Jerome Persell	1975–1978	1978	
Western Michigan	49	John Offerdahl	1982–1985	1995	
Wisconsin
Wisconsin	33	Ron Dayne	1996–1999	2007	
Wisconsin	35	Alan Ameche	1951–1954	2000	
Wisconsin	40	Elroy Hirsch	1941–1942	2005	
Wisconsin	80	Dave Schreiner	1939–1942	2005	
Wisconsin	83	Allan Shafer	1944	2005	
Wisconsin	88	Pat Richter	1960–1962	2006	
Wyoming	17	Josh Allen	2015–2017	2025	

== See also ==
- List of NFL retired numbers
