= Monte Brethauer =

American football player (1931–1994)

No. 86, 80
- Positions: End, defensive back, punter

Personal information
- Born: April 8, 1931; Portland, Oregon, U.S.
- Died: October 14, 1994 (aged 63); Portland, Oregon, U.S.
- Listed height: 6 ft 2 in (1.88 m)
- Listed weight: 194 lb (88 kg)

Career information
- High school: Jefferson (Portland)
- College: Oregon
- NFL draft: 1953: 24th round, 279th overall pick

Career history
- Baltimore Colts (1953, 1955)

Awards and highlights
- Second-team All-PCC (1952)

Career NFL statistics
- Receptions: 10
- Receiving yards: 133
- Punts: 55
- Punting yards: 2,161
- Average punt: 39.3
- Stats at Pro Football Reference

Monte Leon Brethauer (/ˈbrɛθaʊər/ BRETH-our; April 8, 1931 – October 14, 1994) was an American professional football player who was an end, defensive back and punter who played in the National Football League (NFL). He played college football for the Oregon Ducks.

== Early life ==
Brethauer was born to Volga German parents and grew up in Portland, Oregon. He attended Jefferson High School, where he was named first-team All-Portland Interscholastic League twice in football.

== College career ==
Brethauer was a three year starter for the Oregon Ducks at end. He led the team in receiving and set a school record in catches all three years. Brethauer finished as the Ducks' career receptions leader with 101 catches. As a senior, he caught 41 passes for 486 yards and two touchdowns and was named second-team All-Pacific Coast Conference.

== Professional career ==
Brethauer was selected 279th overall in the 24th round of the 1953 NFL draft by the Baltimore Colts. He caught 10 passes for 133 yards on offense and intercepted a pass on defense as a rookie during the Colts' inaugural season. Brethauer was drafted into the Army after the season and missed 1954 and was re-signed by the Colts after being discharged in 1955. Brethauer was waived during training camp in 1956.
