= Jim Sears =

American football player (1931–2002)

Jimmy Sears
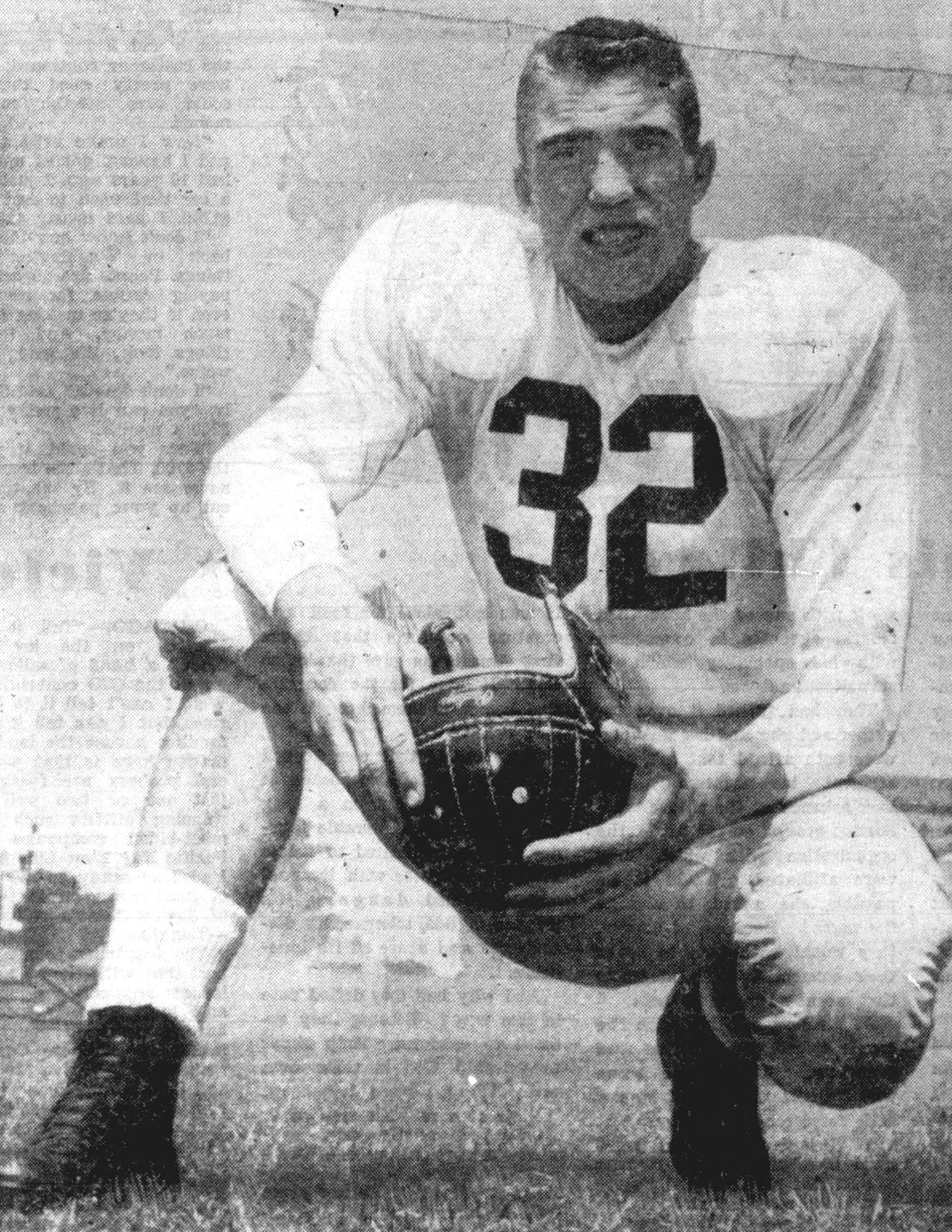
- Sears, circa 1950

No. 21, 26, 36, 35
- Positions: Defensive back, halfback

Personal information
- Born: March 20, 1931; Los Angeles, California, U.S.
- Died: January 4, 2002 (aged 70); Woodland Hills, California, U.S.
- Listed height: 5 ft 11 in (1.80 m)
- Listed weight: 183 lb (83 kg)

Career information
- High school: Inglewood (Inglewood, California)
- College: USC (1950–1952)
- NFL draft: 1953: 6th round, 62nd overall pick

Career history
- Chicago Cardinals (1954, 1957–1958); Los Angeles Chargers (1960); Denver Broncos (1961)

Awards and highlights
- NFL kickoff return yards leader (1958); Consensus All-American (1952); Voit Trophy (1952); Pop Warner Trophy (1952); First-team All-PCC (1952)

Career NFL/AFL statistics
- Rushing yards: 119
- Rushing average: 3.5
- Receptions: 18
- Receiving yards: 253
- Total touchdowns: 3
- Stats at Pro Football Reference

James Herbert "Jimmy" Sears (March 20, 1931 – January 4, 2002) was an American professional football player who was a defensive back and halfback in the National Football League (NFL) and the American Football League (AFL). He played college football for the USC Trojans.

== Early life ==
Sears prepped at Inglewood High School in Inglewood, California, where he was student body president in spring 1949.

== College career ==
Sears played college football at the University of Southern California. He was seventh in the Heisman Trophy voting his senior year, becoming the first Trojan to receive votes for the Heisman.

In 1952, he became the second person to receive the W.J. Voit Memorial Trophy as the outstanding football player on the Pacific Coast. Before playing for the USC Trojans, Sears played at El Camino Junior College in Torrance, California.

== Professional career ==
Sears played for the NFL's Chicago Cardinals (1954, 1957–1958), and the AFL's Los Angeles Chargers (1960) and Denver Broncos (1961).

== Coaching career ==
Sears was an assistant coach for USC during the 1959 season.

== See also ==
- Other American Football League players
- 1952 College Football All-America Team
