= Hal Miller (American football) =

American football player (1930–2011)

- Miller with Miss America 1953

No. 77
- Position: Offensive tackle

Personal information
- Born: February 4, 1930; Kingsport, Tennessee, U.S.
- Died: November 21, 2011 (aged 81); Kingsport, Tennessee, U.S.
- Listed height: 6 ft 4 in (1.93 m)
- Listed weight: 230 lb (104 kg)

Career information
- High school: Dobyns-Bennett (Kingsport)
- College: Georgia Tech
- NFL draft: 1953: 5th round, 58th overall pick

Career history
- San Francisco 49ers (1953)

Awards and highlights
- Consensus All-American (1952); First-team All-SEC (1952)

Career NFL statistics
- Games played: 12
- Games started: 3
- Stats at Pro Football Reference

Harold Maurice Miller (February 4, 1930 – November 21, 2011) was an American professional football player. He played as a tackle for the San Francisco 49ers of the National Football League (NFL) in 1953.

== Playing career ==
Miller attended Dobyns-Bennett High School in Kingsport, Tennessee where he was selected as a 1948 Wigwam Wiseman High School Football All-American.

Miller played college football at the Georgia Institute of Technology and was a two time All-Southeastern Conference selection and a consensus All-American in 1952, when he led Georgia Tech Yellow Jackets as co-captain to a national championship. He played in the 1953 College All-Star Game. Miller is a member of the Georgia Tech Athletic Hall of Fame, Georgia Sports Hall of Fame, Tennessee Sports Hall of Fame, NEC Sports Hall of Fame and the Dobyns-Bennett High School Alumni Hall of Fame.

Miller was selected 58th overall in the fifth round of the 1953 NFL draft. He died aged 81 on November 21, 2011.
