= Harvey Achziger =

American businessman and football player (1931–2022)

Profile
- Position: Tackle

Personal information
- Born: August 8, 1931; Eaton, Colorado, U.S.
- Died: May 15, 2022 (aged 90); Sumter, South Carolina, U.S.
- Listed height: 6 ft 2 in (1.88 m)
- Listed weight: 235 lb (107 kg)

Career information
- High school: Eaton (CO)
- College: Colorado State
- NFL draft: 1953: 26th round, 309th overall pick

Career history
- 1957: Hamilton Tiger-Cats

Awards and highlights
- Grey Cup champion (1957); First-team All-American (1952)

Harvey Walter Achziger (August 8, 1931 – May 15, 2022) was an American businessman and former professional football player. Achziger played for the Hamilton Tiger-Cats in Hamilton, Ontario, Canada, with whom he won the Grey Cup in 1957.

Achziger studied agriculture and played college football at Colorado State University, then known as Colorado A&M. Achziger was an All-American in 1952 and was later drafted to the National Football League (NFL) by the Philadelphia Eagles in the 26th round of the 1953 NFL draft. He was inducted into the school's Sports Hall of Fame in November 2012.

After a knee injury ended his football career, Achziger moved to Sumter, South Carolina where he works in the family business. He is a father of two and has one grandchild.

Achziger was inducted to the Colorado State University Athletics Hall of Fame in 2012.

Achziger died in Sumter, South Carolina on May 15, 2022, at the age of 90.

== Awards ==
- 1951, 1952 - First-team all-Mountain State Athletic Conference
- 1952 - All-American
- Colorado State University Athletics Hall of Fame (inducted 2012)

- Achziger CSU Athletics Hall of Fame Bio

Source: Colorado State University
