= Johnny Olszewski (American football) =

American football player (1929–1996)

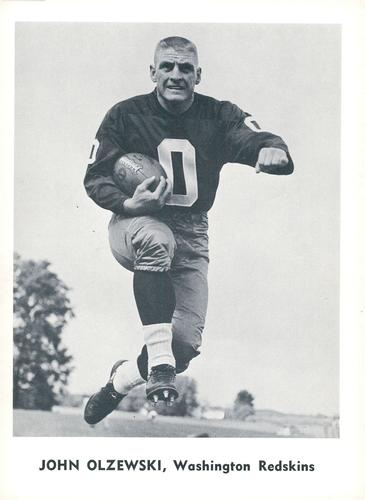
- Olszewski c. 1959

No. 33, 36, 0
- Positions: Fullback, halfback

Personal information
- Born: December 21, 1929; Washington, D.C., U.S.
- Died: December 8, 1996 (aged 66); Long Beach, California, U.S.
- Listed height: 5 ft 11 in (1.80 m)
- Listed weight: 200 lb (91 kg)

Career information
- High school: St. Anthony (Long Beach)
- College: California
- NFL draft: 1953: 1st round, 4th overall pick

Career history
- Chicago Cardinals (1953–1957); Washington Redskins (1958–1960); Detroit Lions (1961); Denver Broncos (1962)

Awards and highlights
- 2× Pro Bowl (1953, 1955); Second-team All-American (1952); 2× First-team All-PCC (1950, 1952); Second-team All-PCC (1951)

Career NFL/AFL statistics
- Rushing yards: 3,320
- Rushing average: 4
- Rushing touchdowns: 16
- Receptions: 104
- Receiving yards: 988
- Receiving touchdowns: 3
- Stats at Pro Football Reference

John Peter "Johnny-O" Olszewski (/oʊˈʃɛvskiː/ oh-SHEV-skee; December 21, 1929 – December 8, 1996) was an American professional football player who was a fullback in the National Football League (NFL). After a legendary career with the California Golden Bears in college, the first-round pick (fourth overall) in the 1953 NFL draft split nine seasons between the Chicago Cardinals, the Washington Redskins and the Detroit Lions in the pro ranks. He concluded his career in the American Football League (AFL) with the Denver Broncos in 1962.

A power runner with a quick burst and unusually strong leg drive, the 5-foot-11, 200-pound Olszewski was selected to the Pro Bowl while with the Cardinals in the 1953 and 1955 seasons.

== High school career ==
Olszewski attended St. Anthony High School in Long Beach, where he starred for its football team. In 2013, Olszewski was inducted into the inaugural St. Anthony Hall of Fame class, the consensus choice as the greatest athlete in school history.

== College career ==
Upon graduation, the entire St. Anthony High School backfield that also numbered William Mais, Dean O’Hare and John Peterson remained together to attend the University of California in Berkeley, which head coach Pappy Waldorf had turned into a national powerhouse only years earlier.

As a sophomore, Olszewski burst on the college scene to gain 1,008 yards, only the second back to eclipse the 1,000-yard mark in Cal history. Olszewski topped the 100-yard mark on five occasions, which included 144 yards in a 35–0 rout of UCLA at home. The Bears finished with a 9–1–1 record and berth in the Rose Bowl game.

While a health issue limited his availability as a junior, Olszewski was able to average 7.3 yards per carry just the same. In a wild 42–35 victory against Washington State on the road, he went off for 269 yards on the ground, the highest output of his college career.

So much was expected of Olszewski in his senior year, he appeared on the cover of Sport Magazine as one of the premier backs in the country. The senior didn't disappoint – he again garnered All-American honors on the strength of 845 yards and seven touchdowns on the ground.

Overall, Olszewski led the Bears to a 24–6–1 record and one Rose Bowl appearance in three seasons. His 2,504 rushing yards rank 11th in school history.

== Professional career ==
=== Washington Redskins ===
In 1958, Olszewski found new life in his hometown of Washington, D.C., where the Redskins acquired him in a July trade. Not long after his arrival, Olszewski also had a new jersey number after team management granted his request for a change from 32 to 0. He became the first NFL player in 12 years to wear the number.

Olszewski proceeded to lead the Redskins with 607 yards from scrimmage, 505 of them on the ground. The highlight came on Oct. 19, when he ran over the Green Bay Packers for 165 yards and one touchdown on 21 carries in a 37–21 triumph. League-wide, his average of 5.2 yards per attempt ranked behind only Lenny Moore, Bobby Mitchell, Joe Perry and Jim Brown, all future Pro Football Hall of Fame selections.

In three seasons with the Redskins, Olszewski rushed for 1,164 yards and six touchdowns on 238 carries (4.9 per attempt). He also caught 28 passes for 226 yards (8.1 average).

In 1993, Olszewski was inducted into the California Athletics Hall of Fame.

Olszewski is buried at All Souls cemetery in Long Beach.

== NFL/AFL career statistics ==
Legend
**Bold**	Career high

Year	Team	Games		Rushing					Receiving				
Year	Team	GP	GS	Att	Yds	Avg	Lng	TD	Rec	Yds	Avg	Lng	TD
1953	CRD	12	12	106	386	3.6	34	**4**	**21**	**210**	10.0	**77**	**1**
1954	CRD	11	11	106	352	3.3	23	1	12	133	11.1	25	**1**
1955	CRD	11	9	84	326	3.9	41	1	9	37	4.1	9	0
1956	CRD	11	11	**157**	**598**	3.8	34	2	17	182	10.7	31	0
1957	CRD	11	11	83	271	3.3	38	2	3	36	12.0	24	0
1958	WAS	10	9	98	505	5.2	45	2	11	102	9.3	36	0
1959	WAS	10	4	65	432	**6.6**	**65**	1	7	62	8.9	15	0
1960	WAS	11	2	75	227	3.0	15	3	10	62	6.2	31	0
1961	DET	14	2	30	109	3.6	15	0	1	14	**14.0**	14	0
1962	DEN	12	1	33	114	3.5	46	0	13	150	11.5	26	**1**
Career		113	72	837	3,320	4.0	65	16	104	988	9.5	77	3

== See also ==
- List of American Football League players
