= Bill Stits =

American football player (1931–2011)

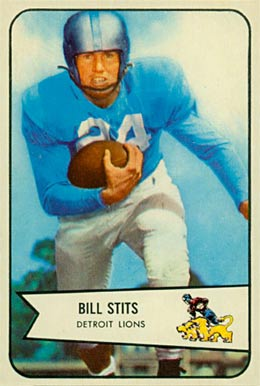
- Stits on a 1954 Bowman football card

No. 20, 26, 48
- Positions: Defensive back, halfback

Personal information
- Born: July 26, 1931; Lomita, California, U.S.
- Died: December 5, 2011 (aged 80); Palm Desert, California, U.S.
- Listed height: 6 ft 4 in (1.93 m)
- Listed weight: 194 lb (88 kg)

Career information
- High school: Narbonne
- College: UCLA
- NFL draft: 1954: 4th round, 44th overall pick

Career history
- Detroit Lions (1954–1956); San Francisco 49ers (1957–1958); Washington Redskins (1959); New York Giants (1959-1961)

Awards and highlights
- Pro Bowl (1954); First-team All-PCC (1952)

Career NFL statistics
- Interceptions: 15
- Fumble recoveries: 9
- Total touchdowns: 1
- Stats at Pro Football Reference

William David Stits (July 26, 1931 – December 5, 2011) was an American professional football player who was a safety in the National Football League (NFL) for the Detroit Lions, San Francisco 49ers, Washington Redskins, and New York Giants. He played college football for the UCLA Bruins and was selected in the fourth round of the 1954 NFL draft.
