= John Michels (guard) =

American gridiron football player (1931–2019)

No. 61, 50
- Position: Guard

Personal information
- Born: February 15, 1931; Philadelphia, Pennsylvania, U.S.
- Died: January 10, 2019 (aged 87); Kingsport, Tennessee, U.S.
- Listed height: 5 ft 11 in (1.80 m)
- Listed weight: 200 lb (91 kg)

Career information
- High school: West Catholic (Philadelphia)
- College: Tennessee (1949–1952)
- NFL draft: 1953: 25th round, 297th overall pick

Career history

Playing
- Philadelphia Eagles (1953); Winnipeg Blue Bombers (1957)

Coaching
- Winnipeg Blue Bombers (1959–1966) Offensive line coach; Minnesota Vikings (1967–1983) Offensive line coach; Minnesota Vikings (1984) Running backs coach; Minnesota Vikings (1985–1993) Offensive line coach

Awards and highlights
- National champion (1951); Consensus All-American (1952); Third-team All-American (1951); Jacobs Blocking Trophy (1952); 2× First-team All-SEC (1951, 1952)

Career NFL statistics
- Games played: 11
- Games started: 1
- Stats at Pro Football Reference
- College Football Hall of Fame

John Joseph Michels (February 15, 1931 – January 10, 2019) was an American professional football offensive lineman who played for the University of Tennessee (1950–1952) and in the National Football League (1953). In 1952, he was a consensus first-team All-American. In 1996, Michels was enshrined in the College Football Hall of Fame. He is best known for coaching the offensive line of the Minnesota Vikings every year from 1967 to 1993 with the exception of 1984 when he coached the running backs.

== See also ==
- 1952 College Football All-America Team
