= 1952 All-Pacific Coast football team =

American all-star college football team

1952 Pacific Coast Conference football standings
	Conf.					Overall
Team	W		L		T	W		L		T
No. 5 USC $	6	–	0	–	0	10	–	1	–	0
No. 6 UCLA	5	–	1	–	0	8	–	1	–	0
Washington	6	–	2	–	0	7	–	3	–	0
California	3	–	3	–	0	7	–	3	–	0
Washington State	3	–	4	–	0	4	–	6	–	0
Stanford	2	–	5	–	0	5	–	5	–	0
Oregon	2	–	5	–	0	2	–	7	–	1
Idaho	1	–	3	–	0	4	–	4	–	1
Oregon State	1	–	6	–	0	2	–	7	–	0
$ – Conference champion; Rankings from AP Poll

The 1952 All-Pacific Coast football team consists of American football players chosen by various organizations for All-Pacific Coast teams for the 1952 college football season.

== Selections ==
=== Backs ===
- Don Heinrich, Washington (AP-1; INS-1; UP-1 [quarterback])
- Jim Sears, USC (AP-1 [safety]; INS-1; UP-1 [halfback])
- Paul Cameron, UCLA (AP-1; INS-1; UP-1 [halfback])
- Johnny Olszewski, California (AP-1; UP-1 [fullback])
- Sam Baker, Oregon State (AP-1; INS-2; UP-2))
- Lindon Crow, USC (AP-1 [defensive back])
- Bill Stits, UCLA (AP-1 [defensive back])
- Lynn Aplanalp, San Jose St. (IN-2)
- Don Johnson, California (INS-2)
- Tom McCormick, Pacific (INS-2)
- Bobby Garrett, Stanford (UP-2)
- Bill Powell, California (UP-2)
- Al Carmichael, USC (UP-2)

=== Ends ===
- George Black, Washington (AP-1; INS-1; UP-1)
- Sam Morley, Stanford (UP-1)
- Ike Jones, UCLA (INS-1)
- Ernie Stockert, UCLA (AP-1; INS-2; UP-2)
- Bob Hooks, USC (AP-1 [defensive end])
- Myron Berliner, UCLA (AP-1 [defensive end])
- Monte Brethauer, Oregon (INS-2; UP-2)

=== Tackles ===
- Bob Van Doren, USC (AP-1 [defensive tackle]; INS-1; UP-1)
- Charles Doud, UCLA (AP-1 [defensive tackle]; UP-1)
- Jack Ellena, UCLA (INS-1; UP-2)
- Jim Vick, Stanford (AP-1)
- Lou Yourkowski, Washington (AP-1; INS-2)
- Charlie Ane Jr., USC (INS-2; UP-2)

=== Guards ===
- Elmer Willhoite, USC (AP-1 [defensive guard]; INS-1; UP-1)
- Emmett Williams, Oregon (UP-1)
- Ed Flynn, UCLA (AP-1; UP-2)
- Len Mayrhofer, Stanford (AP-1)
- Marv Goux, USC (INS-1)
- Jim Salsbury, UCLA (AP-1 [defensive guard])
- Bob Holder, Idaho (UP-2)

=== Centers ===
- Donn Moomaw, UCLA (AP-1 [linebacker]; INS-1; UP-1)
- Lou Welsh, USC (AP-1)
- George Timberlake, USC (AP-1 [linebacker])
- Terry DeBay, UCLA (INS-2)
- Vern Lindskog, Washington (UP-2)

== Key ==
AP = Associated Press

INS = International News Service

UP = United Press

Bold = Consensus first-team selection by at least two of the selectors AP, INS and UP

== See also ==
- 1952 College Football All-America Team
