= Donn Moomaw =

American football player (1931–2025)

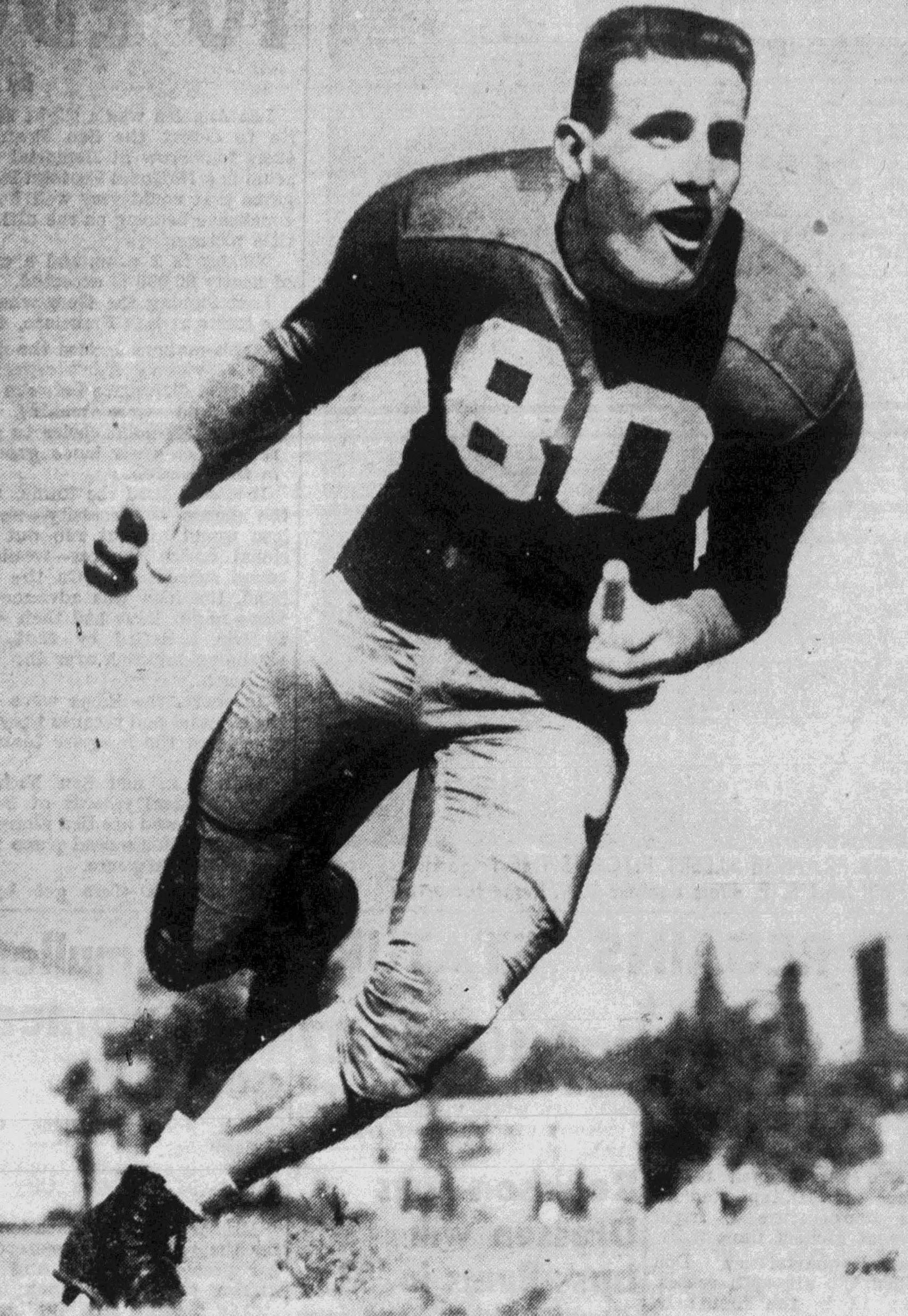
- Moomaw in 1951

No. 80
- Positions: Center, linebacker

Personal information
- Born: October 15, 1931; Santa Ana, California, U.S.
- Died: February 10, 2025 (aged 93); Pasadena, California, U.S.
- Listed height: 6 ft 4 in (1.93 m)
- Listed weight: 220 lb (100 kg)

Career information
- High school: Santa Ana
- College: UCLA
- NFL draft: 1953: 1st round, 9th overall pick

Career history
- Toronto Argonauts (1953); Ottawa Rough Riders (1955)

Awards and highlights
- Consensus All-American (1952); First-team All-American (1950); Second-team All-American (1951); 3× First-team All-PCC (1950, 1951, 1952); UCLA Bruins No. 80 retired
- College Football Hall of Fame

Donn Dement Moomaw (October 15, 1931 – February 10, 2025) was an American professional football player and Presbyterian minister. Moomaw played college football for the UCLA Bruins as the center and linebacker for the team. He was elected to the College Football Hall of Fame in 1973.

Moomaw served on the California State Board of Education from 1968 to 1972. He was known for serving as a pastor at the Bel Air Presbyterian Church, where he befriended then-Governor Ronald Reagan. He gave the invocation at Reagan's inaugurations as California governor and as President of the United States.

== Early life ==
Donn Dement Moomaw was born on October 15, 1931, in Santa Ana, California. He attended Santa Ana High School.

== Football career ==
Moomaw played linebacker in 1950, 1951, and 1952. During that time, he was named a two time All-American (in 1950 and consensus in 1952), making him the first in UCLA history. He was named most valuable player both in 1950 and 1952, and he was co-captain in 1952.

Moomaw was selected ninth overall in the first round of the 1953 NFL draft by the Los Angeles Rams. However, he did not play in the NFL, noting that he did not want to play football on Sundays. Moomaw signed with the Toronto Argonauts of the Canadian Football League. He appeared in seven games for the Argonauts in 1953, and two games for the Ottawa Rough Riders in 1955.

Moomaw's UCLA jersey No. 80 was retired by the team. He was inducted into the College Football Hall of Fame in 1973, and the UCLA Athletics Hall of Fame in its inaugural year of 1984. His football legacy at UCLA continues through the "Donn D. Moomaw Award for Outstanding Defensive Player in USC Game".

== Minister career ==
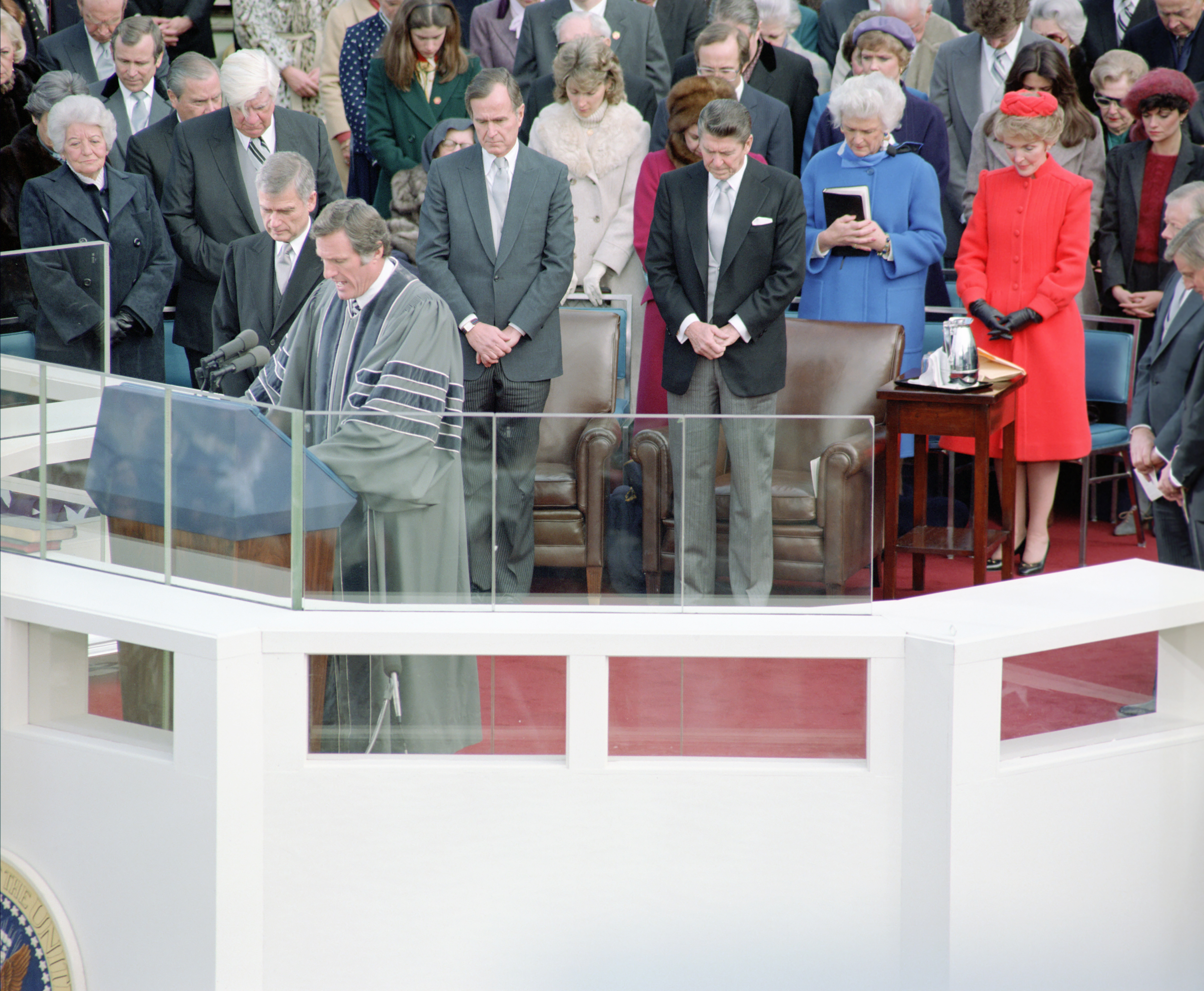
Moomaw delivering the invocation at the first inauguration of Ronald Reagan in 1981

Moomaw later became a Presbyterian minister, most notably serving Los Angeles' Bel Air Presbyterian Church as pastor from 1964 to 1993. During this time, he became friends with California governor Ronald Reagan and wife Nancy. Moomaw gave the invocation at Reagan's inauguration as governor of California in both 1967 and 1971 and later at his 1981 presidential inauguration and 1985 presidential inauguration. His invocation at the 1981 inauguration included a prayer for freedom for 52 Americans.

=== Sex scandal ===
In 1993, he was forced to resign as a result of "sexual contact" with five women. In 1997, he was allowed to return to the pulpit on a full-time basis at the 800-member Village Community Presbyterian Church in Rancho Santa Fe. Prior to that position, Moomaw was allowed to serve as the guest preacher at St. Andrew's Presbyterian Church.

== Personal life and death ==
Moomaw was predeceased by his wife, Carol. They had five children and ten grandchildren. He served on the California State Board of Education from 1968 to 1972.

Moomaw died in Pasadena, California, on February 10, 2025, at the age of 93.
