= Bob Van Doren =

American football player (1929–2012)

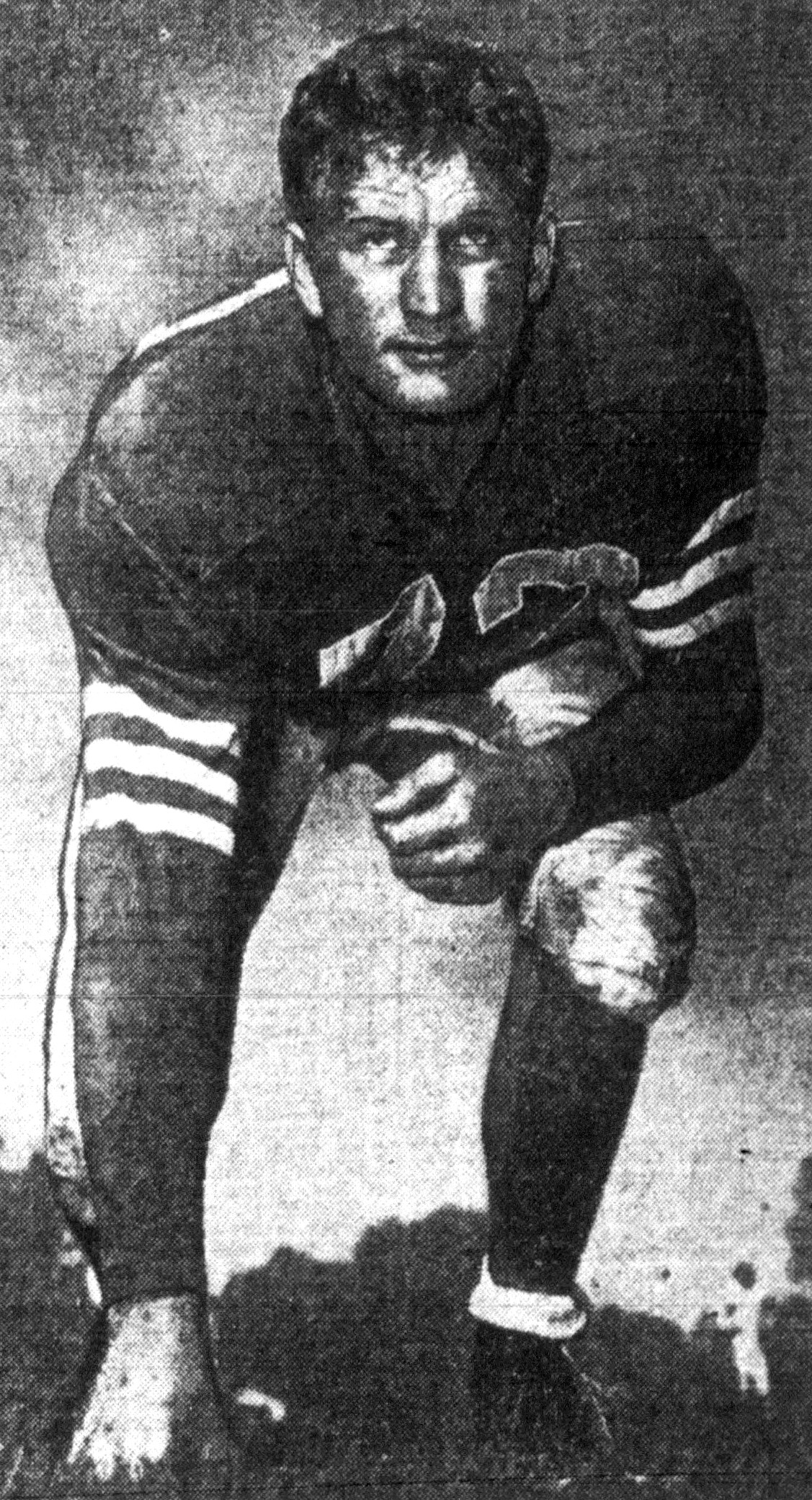
- Van Doren, circa 1953

No. 89
- Position: Defensive end

Personal information
- Born: March 22, 1929; Baltimore, Maryland, U.S.
- Died: June 13, 2012 (aged 83)
- Listed height: 6 ft 3 in (1.91 m)
- Listed weight: 215 lb (98 kg)

Career information
- High school: San Diego (San Diego, California)
- College: USC
- NFL draft: 1953: 5th round, 59th overall pick

Career history
- San Francisco 49ers (1953)

Awards and highlights
- First-team All-PCC (1952); Second-team All-PCC (1951)
- Stats at Pro Football Reference

Robert S. Van Doren (March 22, 1929 – June 13, 2012) was an American football defensive end who played for the San Francisco 49ers. He played college football at the University of Southern California, having previously attended Admiral Farragut Academy. Van Doren died in June 2012 at the age of 83.
