= Charlie Ane Jr. =

American football player (1931–2007)

Charlie Ane
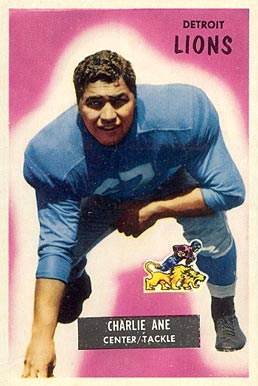
- Ane on a 1955 Bowman football card

No. 50
- Positions: Tackle, center

Personal information
- Born: January 25, 1931; Honolulu, Hawaii, U.S.
- Died: May 9, 2007 (aged 76); Honolulu, Hawaii, U.S.
- Listed height: 6 ft 2 in (1.88 m)
- Listed weight: 260 lb (118 kg)

Career information
- High school: Punahou School (Honolulu)
- College: USC (1951–1952)
- NFL draft: 1953: 4th round, 50th overall pick

Career history
- Detroit Lions (1953–1959); Dallas Cowboys (1960)*
- * Offseason or practice squad member only

Awards and highlights
- 2× NFL champion (1953, 1957); Second-team All-Pro (1956); 2× Pro Bowl (1956, 1958); Second-team All-PCC (1952)

Career NFL statistics
- Games played: 83
- Starts: 78
- Fumble recoveries: 6
- Stats at Pro Football Reference

Charles Teetai Ane Jr. (/ˈɑːniː/ AHN-ee; January 25, 1931 – May 9, 2007) was an American professional football player who was an offensive lineman for the Detroit Lions of the National Football League (NFL). He played college football for the USC Trojans.

== Early life ==
Ane excelled in baseball, basketball and track as well as football at the Punahou School in Honolulu, Hawaii. He was a key two-way lineman on the powerful "Buff 'n Blue" teams of the late 1940s. He was inducted into the Hawaii Sports Hall of Fame. In 2015, he was inducted into the Polynesian Football Hall of Fame.

== College career ==
Ane attended Compton Community College, before transferring to the University of Southern California. He was a two-way tackle and quarterback in the single wing offense. He also played baseball before leaving a year early for the NFL. He was an All-Coast selection in the early 1950s. In 2007, he was inducted into the USC Athletic Hall of Fame.

== Professional career ==
Ane was selected by the Detroit Lions in the fourth round (50th overall) of the 1953 NFL draft. As a rookie, he was a backup for center Vince Banonis. The next year was named the starter at right tackle. After his third year. He was rotated between the center and the right tackle positions throughout his career.

He was elected to the Pro Bowl in 1956 and 1958. He helped the Lions to three division titles, two NFL championships and was voted team captain from 1958 to 1959. He only missed one game during his seven-year career.

Ane was selected by the Dallas Cowboys in the 1960 NFL expansion draft, but he opted to retire instead of reporting to the team.

== Coaching career ==
Ane served as head football coach at Damien Memorial School on Oahu and St. Anthony High School on Maui and was an assistant coach at Punahou, Radford High School and Kaimuki High School. Ane was later an assistant coach under his son at Punahou for four seasons from 1999 to 2003.

== Personal life ==
His son, Charles "Kale" Teetai Ane III played at Michigan State and for seven seasons in the NFL before becoming head football coach at Punahou School.

Ane died on May 9, 2007, in Honolulu. He was 76 years old and died after prolonged health issues.
