= Paul Cameron (gridiron football) =

American gridiron football player (born 1932)

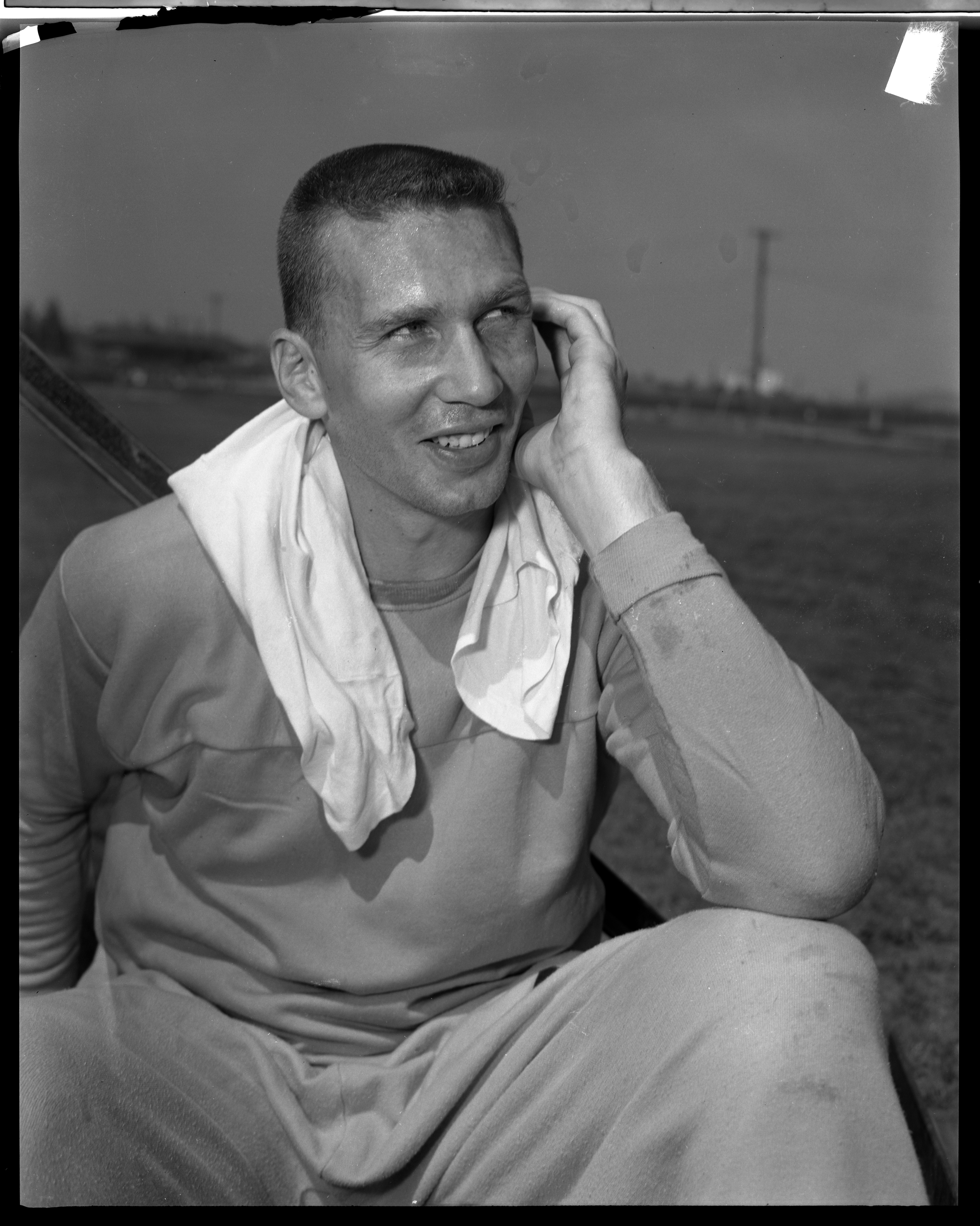
- Cameron with the BC Lions in 1957

No. 34, 91, 71
- Positions: Halfback, defensive back

Personal information
- Born: August 17, 1932; Burbank, California, U.S.
- Died: December 23, 2023 (aged 91)
- Listed height: 6 ft 0 in (1.83 m)
- Listed weight: 185 lb (84 kg)

Career information
- High school: Burbank
- College: UCLA (1950–1953)
- NFL draft: 1954: 8th round, 91st overall pick

Career history
- Pittsburgh Steelers (1954); BC Lions (1956–1959)

Awards and highlights
- Pro Bowl (1954); WIFU All-Star (1956); Consensus All-American (1953); First-team All-American (1952); 2× First-team All-PCC (1952, 1953); Second-team All-PCC (1951); UCLA Bruins No. 34 retired

Career NFL statistics
- Interceptions: 7
- Stats at Pro Football Reference
- College Football Hall of Fame

Paul Leslie Cameron (August 17, 1932 – December 22, 2023) was an American football player. He played college football for the UCLA Bruins, earning consensus All-American honors in 1953 and finishing third in Heisman Trophy voting. He was inducted into the College Football Hall of Fame in 2024. Cameron played professionally for the Pittsburgh Steelers of the National Football League (NFL) and the BC Lions of the Western Interprovincial Football Union (WIFU). He was a Pro Bowler with the Steelers in 1954 and a WIFU All-Star with the Lions in 1956.

== Early life and college ==
Paul Leslie Cameron was born on August 17, 1932, in Burbank, California and attended Burbank High School. He played college football for the UCLA Bruins of the University of California, Los Angeles. He was on the Bruins freshman team in 1950 and a three-year letterman from 1951 to 1953. He rushed for 597 yards and passed for 855 yards in 1951, leading the Pacific Coast Conference (PCC) in total offense with 1,428 yards. He was named second-team All-PCC by both the Associated Press and United Press that season. In 1952, he was a consensus first-team All-PCC selection, a Newspaper Enterprise Association first-team All-American, and finished sixth in Heisman Trophy voting. As a senior in 1953, he rushed 134 times for 672 yards and 12 touchdowns, made four interceptions, and also finished third in the country with a 41.3 punting average. Cameron garnered consensus All-American and first-team All-PCC honors for the 1953 season while also finishing third in Heisman voting. Overall, he rushed for 1,451 yards and 19 touchdowns and passed for 1,881 yards and 25 touchdowns during his college career. He set school career records for touchdown passes, total offense with 3,332 yards, and total touchdowns with 44. Cameron was inducted into the UCLA Athletic Hall of Fame as part of its first class in 1984. His no. 34 jersey has also been retired by the school.

== Professional career ==
Cameron was selected by the Pittsburgh Steelers in the eighth round, with the 91st overall, of the 1954 NFL draft. He officially signed with the team on February 4, 1954. He started all 12 games for the Steelers during the 1954 season, recording seven interceptions for 118 yards and three fumble recoveries. Cameron was named to the 1954 Pro Bowl. He became a free agent after the 1955 season.

Cameron then played for the BC Lions of the Western Interprovincial Football Union (WIFU) from 1956 to 1959. He played in 15 games for the Lions in 1956, totaling 82 carries for 430 yards, 16 completions on 35 passing attempts (45.7%) for 199 yards, one touchdown, and four interceptions, 24 receptions for 428 yards and three touchdowns, four interceptions for 142 yards, 20 punts for 926 yards, 14 kick returns for 264 yards, and three fumble recoveries. He was named a WIFU All-Star for his performance during the 1956 season. He appeared in 16 games for the Lions in 1957, accumulating 78 rushing attempts for 514 yards and two touchdowns, 57 passing yards, one passing touchdown, 36 catches for 593 yards and five touchdowns, and six interceptions for 63 yards. Cameron played in 15 games again in 1958, recording 54 carries for 304 yards, 58 receptions for 834 yards and two touchdowns, five interceptions for 137 yards and one touchdown, and five fumble recoveries. He only appeared in one game for the Lions during his final season in 1959, catching four passes for 48 yards.

== Post-playing career ==
Camerson served in the United States Army from 1954 to 1956. He worked in the entertainment industry after his football career, including stints with Disney Productions, Tomorrow Entertainment, and Allied Artists. He was also the vice president of production for EMI Television. He was also a member of the Screen Directors' Guild, Encino Property Owners Association and UCLA Scholarship Committee.

Cameron died on December 22, 2023. He was inducted into the College Football Hall of Fame in 2024. The National Football Foundation called him "one of the last great single-wing halfbacks".

== See also ==
- List of NCAA football retired numbers
