= 1953 All-Eastern football team =

American all-star college football team

The 1953 All-Eastern football team consists of American football players chosen by various selectors as the best players at each position among the Eastern colleges and universities during the 1953 college football season.

== Quarterbacks ==
- Pat Stark, Syracuse (UP-1)
- Roger Franz, Fordham (INS-1)
- Pete Vann, Army (AP-2, INS-2)

== Halfbacks ==
- Dick Clasby, Harvard (AP-1 [b], UP-1, INS-1)
- Gene Filipski, Villanova (AP-2, UP-1)
- Pat Uebel, Army (UP-1)
- Lenny Moore, Penn State (INS-1)
- Richard Lalla, Colgate (AP-1 [b])
- Homer Smith, Princeton (AP-1 [b])
- Bobby Epps, Pittsburgh (AP-1 [b], INS-2)
- Richard Zotti, Boston College (AP-2)
- Royce Flippin, Princeton (INS-2)
- Lou Turner, Dartmouth (INS-2)

== Fullbacks ==
- Joe Varaitis, Penn (AP-2, INS-1)

== Ends ==
- Bob Mischak, Army (UP-1, INS-1)
- Dick Deitrick, Pitt (UP-1, INS-1)
- Henry C. Lemire, Holy Cross (AP-1)
- James Garrity, Penn State (AP-1, UP-2, INS-2)
- Richard Deitrick, Pitt (AP-2)
- David McLaughlin, Dartmouth (AP-2)
- Andy Nacrelli, Fordham (UP-2)
- Pete Popovich, Colgate (INS-2)

== Tackles ==
- Jack Shanafelt, Penn (AP-1, UP-1, INS-1)
- Jack C. Perkins, Navy (AP-1, INS-2)
- Bob Farris, Army (AP-2, UP-1)
- Eldred Kraemer, Pitt (UP-2, INS-1)
- Michael Cooney, Holy Cross (AP-2)
- John Casella, Columbia (INS-2)

== Guards ==
- Dick Polich, Yale (AP-1, UP-1)
- Stanley Tsapis, Cornell (AP-1, UP-2)
- Steve Eisenhauer, Navy (AP-2, UP-1, INS-2)
- John Cannon, Penn (UP-2, INS-1)
- Bob Fleck, Syracuse (AP-2, UP-2, INS-1)
- Ralph Chesnauskas, Army (INS-2)

== Center ==
- Ted Kukowski, Syracuse (AP-1, UP-1, INS-1)
- Thomas Coolidge, Harvard (AP-2)
- Frank Morze, Boston College (UP-2)
- George Trautman, Penn (INS-2)

== Key ==
- AP = Associated Press
- UP = United Press
- INS = International News Service

== See also ==
- 1953 College Football All-America Team
