= John Miller (offensive lineman, born 1934) =

American football player (1934–2015)

No. 73, 72
- Positions: Offensive tackle, defensive lineman

Personal information
- Born: February 1, 1934; Lowell, Massachusetts, U.S.
- Died: May 27, 2015 (aged 81); Revere, Massachusetts, U.S.
- Listed height: 6 ft 5 in (1.96 m)
- Listed weight: 253 lb (115 kg)

Career information
- College: Boston College
- NFL draft: 1955: 9th round, 100th overall pick

Career history
- Washington Redskins (1956, 1958–1959); Green Bay Packers (1960); Boston Patriots (1961)*
- * Offseason or practice squad member only

Career NFL statistics
- Games played: 41
- Games started: 20
- Safeties: 1
- Stats at Pro Football Reference

John Joseph Miller (February 1, 1934 – May 27, 2015) was an American professional football offensive and defensive lineman in the National Football League (NFL) for the Washington Redskins and the Green Bay Packers.

== College career ==
Miller played college football at Boston College from 1952 to 1955, as a four-year starter at tackle, where he played shoulder-to-shoulder with center Frank Morze and guard Henry O'Brien as the main blockers for team captain Joe Johnson.

Miller's sophomore year, he earned the O'Melia Award for outstanding player in the BC–Holy Cross game, the only offensive tackle to ever do so.

In 1954, Miller's junior year, the Eagles went 8–1.

1955, Miller's senior year he was elected team captain, and earned All-American honors as the Eagles went 5–2–1.

He played in the North–South Shrine Game and the Senior Bowl just before he was drafted in the ninth round of the 1955 NFL draft.

== Professional career ==
Johnny Miller was listed at 6 feet 5 inches (1.96 m) and 253 pounds (115 kg) as a special team's punt and kick returner, in the Right Tackle position. He also lined up as Tackle, Defensive Tackle, and Defensive End for the Redskins for three seasons.

In 1960, Miller was traded to Vince Lombardi's Green Bay Packers where he played just five games and finished his NFL career.

== Later life and death ==
In 1992, Miller was inducted into the Boston College Varsity Club Athletic Hall of Fame. In 2014, Miller was inducted into St. Mary's Lynn High School Varsity Athletic Hall of Fame for coaching. On May 27, 2015, Miller died at his home.
