= Tommy Bell (American football player) =

American football player (1932–2019)

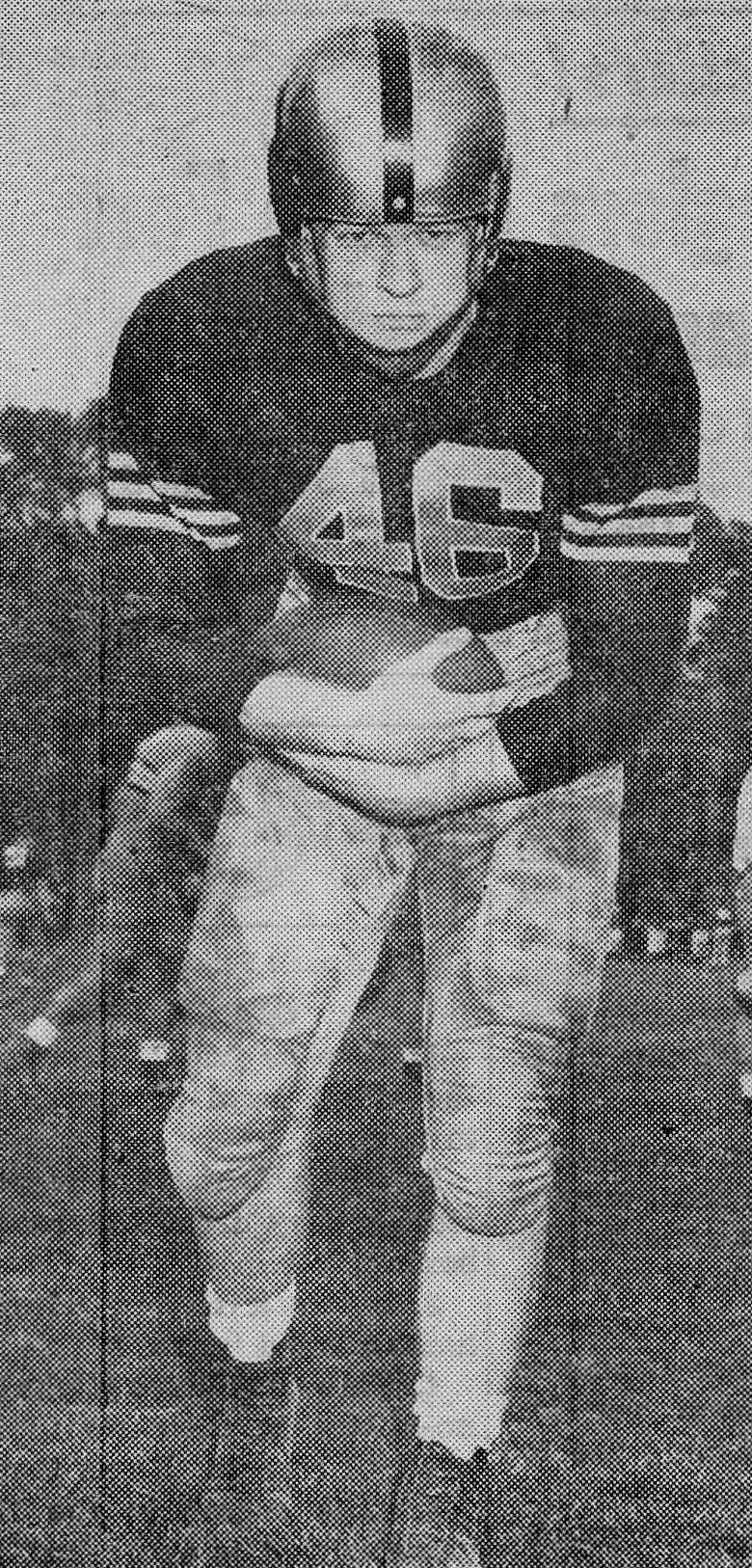
- Bell, circa 1952

Profile
- Position: Halfback

Personal information
- Born: July 10, 1932; The Bronx, New York, U.S.
- Died: August 14, 2019 (age 87); West Chester, Ohio, U.S.

Career information
- High school: Mount Saint Michael Academy
- College: United States Military Academy

Career history
- Army Cadets (1954)

Awards and highlights
- First-team All-American (1954); First-team All-Eastern (1954)

Thomas James Bell (July 10, 1932 – August 14, 2019) was an American football player. He played for the Army Cadets football teams from 1950 to 1954 and was the first Army player to rush for 1,000 yards in a season. He was selected as a first-team halfback on the 1954 All-America college football team.

== Early life ==
Bell was born in 1932 in The Bronx, the son of Irish immigrants. He was a star football player at the Mount Saint Michael Academy, a Catholic high school in the Wakefield neighborhood of The Bronx. He was recruited by Vince Lombardi to play football at the United States Military Academy.

== Army football ==
Bell attended the United States Military Academy and played college football at the halfback position for the Army Cadets football team from 1950 to 1954. In 1951, he led the Army backs in rushing. He was principally used as a defensive back in 1952 and returned to offense in 1953.

As a senior in 1954, Bell's eligibility was called into question. Bell had played on Army's "plebe" team in 1950, but repeated his plebe year in 1951 after failing a course. Because of the Korean War, the Eastern College Athletic Conference (ECAC) waived the freshman rule in 1951, and Bell played on Army's varsity team. The ECAC in 1953 undertook an investigation to determine whether Bell was permitted to play in his fifth year at the academy. The ECAC ultimately issued a special ruling holding that the academy had misinterpreted the freshman waiver rule, but had acted in good faith. Accordingly, Bell remained eligible to continue playing in the 1954 season.

Bell had his most successful season in 1954. While he had previously been regarded as a "workhorse runner with drive and spirit," he developed a talent for following blockers in 1954. He ran for three touchdowns, including a 64-yard spring against undefeated Yale. He followed with an 80-yard run against Duke. Against Virginia, he rushed for a career-high 165 yards. He also excelled on defense, knocking down a pass in the end zone as time expired to preserve a 21–20 victory over Virginia. He helped lead the 1954 Army team to the No. 7 ranking in the final AP Poll, rushing for 1,020 yards on 96 carries. He was the first player in Army history to compile more than 1,000 rushing yards in a season, and his 1954 average of 10.6 yards per carry is the third highest in Army history. He also ranked third nationally in scoring during the 1954 season with 78 points on 13 touchdowns. He was selected by the Football Writers Association of America and the International News Service as a first-team halfback on their respective 1954 All-America college football teams.

== Later life ==
After graduating from West Point, Bell served as a pilot in the Air Force. He later worked in sales for companies, including Stanley and Ingersoll-Rand. He was inducted into the Army Athletic Hall of Fame in 2016. He died in 2019.
