= The Sage Colleges =

Private educational institution in New York state, United States

Coordinates: 42.72845°N 73.69283°W

Russell Sage College
- Former names: The Sage Colleges, Sage College of Albany, Sage Graduate School, Junior College of Albany
- Motto in English: To be. To know. To do.
- Active: 1916–2020
- Location: Albany and Troy, New York, United States
- Nickname: Gators

The Sage Colleges were a private educational institution comprising three institutions in New York State: Russell Sage College, a women's college in Troy; Sage College of Albany, a co-educational college in Albany; and the Sage Graduate School, which operated both in Troy and in Albany. After a 2020 merger the institutions continue under the single name, Russell Sage College.

== History ==
The first of the colleges to be established was Russell Sage College, which was founded in 1916 by Margaret Olivia Slocum Sage as a "School of Practical Arts". Russell Sage was always a comprehensive college, offering both professional and liberal arts degrees. It consistently been ranked in the top ten comprehensive colleges in the Northeast by U.S. News & World Report. A "Men's Division" was established during World War II, and the first graduate degree was conferred by the college in 1942. In 1949 the "Albany Division" was founded as a second, coeducational campus, offering associate, bachelor's and master's degrees. In 1957 the two-year program, under the name "Sage Junior College of Albany", was granted authority to offer its own degrees. In 1995, the Sage Graduate School was given permission to grant degrees independently, the Sage Evening College was recognized as a separate educational entity, and the four elements of Sage were rechartered together as The Sage Colleges. In 2002 the two-year college and the evening college were subsumed in a new four-year college of professional studies, Sage College of Albany. The three colleges, all part of the corporate institution The Sage Colleges, were governed by a common president, Dr. Christopher Ames, and a common Board of Trustees; each college had its own academic dean.

Due to declining enrollment and a high amount of debt, The Sage Colleges board of directors voted unanimously in March 2019 to merge the three colleges as one institution and rebrand Sage as Russell Sage College beginning in the fall of 2020.

== Athletics ==
The Sage Colleges teams participated as a member of the National Collegiate Athletic Association's Division III. The Gators were a member of the Empire 8. Men's sports (Sage College of Albany) included basketball, cross country, golf, lacrosse, soccer, tennis, and volleyball; while women's sports (Russell Sage College) included basketball, cross country, lacrosse, soccer, softball, tennis, and volleyball.
