= Bobby Epps =

American football player (1932–2014)

No. 35
- Position: Fullback

Personal information
- Born: March 25, 1932; Swissvale, Pennsylvania, U.S.
- Died: November 14, 2014 (aged 82); Swissvale, Pennsylvania, U.S.
- Listed height: 5 ft 9 in (1.75 m)
- Listed weight: 198 lb (90 kg)

Career information
- High school: Swissvale
- College: Pittsburgh (1950–1953)
- NFL draft: 1954: 14th round, 161st overall pick

Career history
- New York Giants (1954–1955, 1957)

Awards and highlights
- First-team All-Eastern (1953)

Career NFL statistics
- Rushing yards: 771
- Rushing average: 4.1
- Receptions: 18
- Receiving yards: 109
- Total touchdowns: 2
- Fumble recoveries: 4
- Stats at Pro Football Reference

Robert Hezekiah Epps (March 25, 1932 - November 14, 2014) was an American professional football fullback who played three seasons for the New York Giants. He played for them from 1954 to 1955 and in 1957; he missed the 1956 season because he was in the Army. He went to college at Pittsburgh.

He had 188 rushes for 771 yards and 2 touchdowns in his career. He also had 18 receptions for 109 yards.

== Early life ==
Epps was born on March 25, 1932, in Swissvale, Pennsylvania. He went to high school in Swissvale also. In high school he played football and basketball. He scored over 30 touchdowns in three years of high school. Epps is one of three Swissvale High School players to play in the NFL. The other two are Emil Karas and Carmine DePascal.

== College career ==
Epps played college football at Pittsburgh. He did not play in 1950. In 1951 he played in 10 games and had 116 rush attempts for 316 yards with a 2.7 average. He also had 15 receptions for 198 yards. He finished the 1952 college season with 106 rush attempts for 502 yards. He also had 6 receptions for 21 yards and a touchdown. He led the Panthers in rushing yards that season as they finished 6–3. In 1953 he led the team in rushing yards again when he had 100 rush attempts for 424 yards. He also had 5 receptions for 3 yards. After his senior season he was named All-State and All-East honors.

=== Career rushing and receiving statistics ===
Year	Games	Att	Yds	Avg	TD	Rec	Yds	Avg	TD
1951	10	116	316	2.7		15	198	13.2	0
1952	9	106	502	4.7		6	21	3.5	1
1953	9	100	424	4.2		5	3	0.6	0
Career	28	322	1242	3.9		26	222	8.5	1

Awards and Honors

- 1953 All-State Honors
- 1953 All-East Honors

== Professional career ==
1954 season

Epps was drafted in the 14th round (161) by the New York Giants in 1954. Of the 29 players the Giants drafted in 1954, Epps was one of 7 to ever play in the NFL. He wore number 35. In his 1st NFL game, he had 7 rushes for 14 yards as the Giants beat the Chicago Cardinals 41–10. He did not have any statistics in week 2 but in week 3 he had 8 rushes for 30 yards as the Giants beat the Washington Redskins 51–21. He did not have any statistics in week 4. In week 5 he had 6 rushes for 26 yards. Then in week 7 he had 4 rushes for 21 yards. From week 8 to week 12 he had 5 rushes for 19 yards and 3 catches for 12 yards. In the 1954 NFL season, he had 30 rush attempts for 110 yards during 10 games. His longest rush of the 1954 season was 11 yards. He also had 5 catches for 20 yards. He did not score any touchdowns in the 1954 season. The Giants went 7–5 that year.

1955 season

Epps was injured in pre-season and missed the first three games. In his first 1955 game (week 4), he had 16 rush attempts for 65 yards against the Chicago Cardinals. The Giants won, 10–0. In week 5 against the Pittsburgh Steelers, Epps had 5 rush attempts for 13 yards. He also had 2 receptions for 3 yards. Then in week 6 against the Washington Redskins, he had 6 rush attempts for 18 yards as the New York Giants won 35–7. He also had 1 catch for 2 yards. His next game was his best game; the Giants lost to the Cleveland Browns, 14-24 but Epps had 13 rushes for 80 yards. In week 8 of the 1955 season, he had 11 rushes for 46 yards as they won against the Baltimore Colts. His next game was a 31–7 win over the Philadelphia Eagles where he had 14 rushes for 51 yards and his first career touchdown. He also had 1 reception for 0 yards. He had his second career touchdown the next week, a 35–35 tie against the Cleveland Browns. In the game he had 9 rushes for 29 yards. He had 9 rushes for 34 yards the next week and 12 rushes for 39 yards in his final week. He finished the year with 95 carries for 375 yards. He also had 5 receptions for 8 yards. Epps had the second-most rushing yards for the Giants in 1955. He fumbled once and had one recovery. His only two career touchdowns were in this season.

1956 season

He missed the 1956 season due to being in the Army. However, that was the year that the Giants won the championship.

1957 season

The 1957 season was his last NFL season. In week 1 he had 3 rushes for 4 yards and one catch for 11 yards as the Giants lost 3–6 against the Cleveland Browns. In week 2, against the Philadelphia Eagles, he had 10 rushes for 37 yards. He also had a second game with one catch for 11 yards. Week 3 was his only career 100-yard game rushing. He had 13 attempts for 115 yards against the Washington Redskins. He also had 2 catches for 3 yards. In week 4 he had 4 rushes for 2 yards as the Giants beat the Pittsburgh Steelers, 35–0. In week 5 he had 6 rushes for 17 yards. In week 8 the Giants won 13–0 against the Philadelphia Eagles. During the game he had 5 rushes for 48 yards and a 9.6 average. The next week the Giants won against the Cardinals 28–21; in the game Epps had 10 rushes for 34 yards and one catch for 34 yards. That catch would be the longest of his career. The next week he only had 1 carry for 5 yards against the San Francisco 49ers. The next week he played the Pittsburgh Steelers. He had 7 rushes for 18 yards. He also had one catch for 10 yards and his first career pass attempt. His first and only attempt was incomplete. His final career game was a 28–34 loss against the Browns. He had 4 rush attempts for 6 yards. In his final season, he had 63 rushes for 286 yards. He also had 1 100-yard game. He had 8 catches for 81 yards. He also had one pass attempt. He finished his career with 188 rushes for 771 yards and two touchdowns, both in 1955. He also had 18 catches for 109 yards. His longest run was 55 yards and his longest catch was 34 yards. He had 3 career fumbles and 4 recoveries. He retired to pursue a career in engineering.

== Later life ==
In 2002 he was inducted into the Western Chapter Pennsylvania Sports Hall of Fame. He died on November 14, 2014, at the age of 82.

== NFL Statistics ==
NFL statistics
General			Rushing						Receiving						Fumbles	
Year	Team	GP	Att	Yards	Avg	Lng	TD	FD	Rec	Yards	Avg	Lng	TD	FD	Fum	Lost
1954	NYG	10	30	110	3.7	11	0	0	5	20	4	10	0	0	1	0
1955	NYG	9	95	375	3.9	24	2	0	5	8	1.6	5	0	0	1	0
1957	NYG	12	63	286	4.5	55	0	0	8	81	10.1	34	0	0	1	0
Career		31	188	771	4.1	55	2	0	18	109	6.1	34	0	0	3	0

== See also ==
- Pittsburgh Panthers football
- New York Giants
- 1954 New York Giants season
- 1955 New York Giants season
- 1957 New York Giants season
