= Sage Graduate Schools =

Graduate school in upstate New York

Sage Graduate Schools were a graduate school in upstate New York. It was a member of The Sage Colleges, and operated both in Troy on the campus of Russell Sage College, and in Albany on the campus of Sage College of Albany. It was founded in 1949 and offered master's and doctoral programs in management, health care, psychology, and education. It enrolled approximately 1,200 students. Due to declining enrollment and a high amount of debt, the Sage Colleges board of directors voted unanimously in March 2019 to consolidate Russell Sage, Sage College, and the graduate school as one institution, also named Russell Sage College, starting in the fall of 2020.
