= Pat Stark =

American football player and coach (1930–2020)

Biographical details
- Born: April 8, 1930; Penfield, New York, U.S.
- Died: June 19, 2020 (aged 90)

Playing career

Football
- 1950–1953: Syracuse

Basketball
- 1951–1953: Syracuse
- Position: Quarterback

Coaching career (HC unless noted)

Football
- 1960–1962: Rhode Island (assistant)
- 1963–1968: Harvard (assistant)
- 1969–1983: Rochester (NY)

Head coaching record
- Overall: 69–64–3

Accomplishments and honors

Awards
- 2× First-team All-Eastern (1952, 1953)

Peter G. "Pat" Stark (April 8, 1930 – June 19, 2020) was an American college football player and coach. He served as the head football coach at the University of Rochester from 1969 to 1983, compiling a record of 69–64–3. As a quarterback at Syracuse University, Stark was drafted in the second round with the 19th overall pick by the Pittsburgh Steelers in the 1954 NFL draft, but was also drafted by the Army, serving at Fort Dix until 1956.

He was also a member for the Syracuse men's basketball team from 1951 to 1953, averaging 7.3 points per game.
