= Marcus Patterson =

American professional basketball player

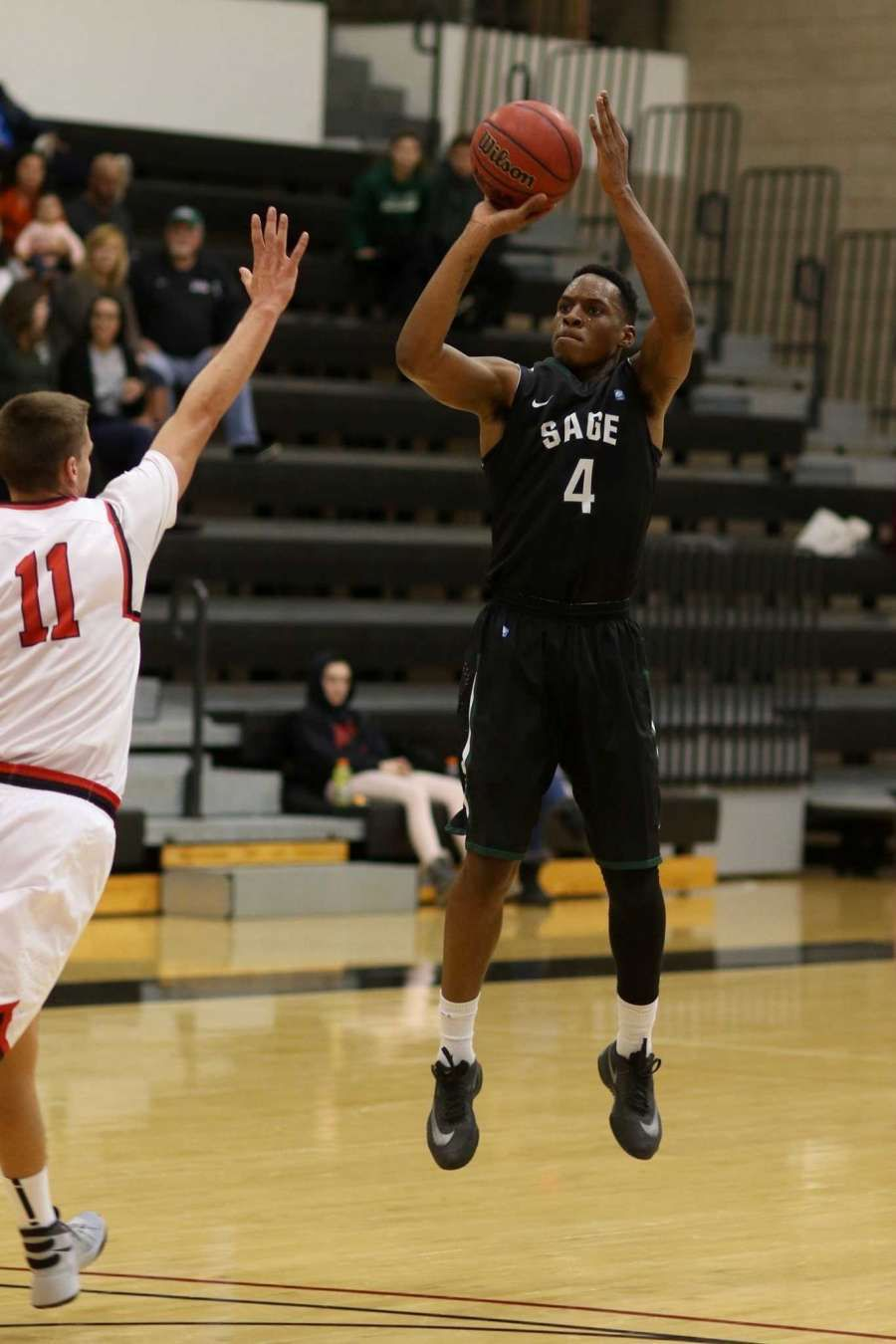
- Patterson playing for Russell Sage in 2017

Free agent
- Position: Shooting guard

Personal information
- Born: February 8, 1995 (age 31) Bronx, New York, U.S.
- Listed height: 6 ft 4 in (1.93 m)
- Listed weight: 200 lb (91 kg)

Career information
- High school: Mount Saint Michael Academy (Bronx, New York)
- College: Russell Sage (2013–2017)
- NBA draft: 2017: undrafted
- Playing career: 2017–present

Career history
- 2017–2018: East London All-Stars
- 2019–2020: Portimonense S.C.
- 2020–2021: C.A. Queluz
- 2021–2022: Portimonense S.C.
- 2022–2023: Teuta

Career highlights
- First-team All-Skyline Conference (2017); Eurobasket.com All Portuguese 1st Division 2nd Team (2020); Eurobasket.com All Portuguese 1st Division All Import Team (2020); Albanian Basketball Supercup Champion (2022); Albanian Basketball Cup Champion (2023)

Marcus Patterson (born February 8, 1995) is a Jamaican-American professional basketball player who last played for Teuta of the Albanian Basketball Superleague and Liga Unike. He played college basketball for Russell Sage. He represents the Jamaica men’s national team.

== Early life and personal life ==
Patterson was born and raised in the Bronx, New York. He attended and played basketball at Mount Saint Michael Academy, where he helped his team to the 2011 CHSAA City A Championship.

== College career ==
In 2014–2015, he was a member of the Gator Skyline Conference Championship. The Gators also got 15 points from sophomore forward Patterson.

In 2015–2016, he started 23 of 26 games played while adding 276 points. Patterson averaged 10.6 points and 6.7 rebounds per outing for the Gators. He earned numerous awards including a selection to the Nazareth College All-Tournament Team.

In 2017–18, Patterson earned a master's degree in Applied Positive Psychology from the University of East London while playing for the school's basketball team.

=== College statistics ===
Year	Team	GP	GS	MPG	FG%	3P%	FT%	RPG	APG	SPG	BPG	PPG
2013–14	Russell Sage College	24	8	13.9	.457	.308	.571	3.4	0.8	0.3	0.2	4.8
2014–15	Russell Sage College	25	2	14.5	.404	.286	.593	3.6	0.6	0.2	0.4	6.0
2015–16	Russell Sage College	26	23	23.8	.461	.304	.756	6.7	0.6	0.8	0.5	10.6
2016–17	Russell Sage College	27	26	30.5	.457	.328	.741	7.5	1.4	1.4	0.2	17.6
Career		102	59	21.0	.449	.314	.704	5.4	0.9	0.9	0.3	10.0

== Professional career ==
=== Portimonense S.C. ===
In September 2019, Patterson went to play for Portimonense S.C. in Portugal. He received two accolades from Eurobasket.com, being named in the ‘All Portuguese 1st Division All-Import Team’ and the ‘All Portuguese 1st Division 2nd Team’. Patterson averaged 22 points per game, 9 rebounds per game and 2 steals per game.

=== C.A. Queluz ===
In October 2020, Patterson signed with C.A. Queluz of the Proliga basketball league. Patterson averaged 8.2 points, three rebounds and 1.7 assists from four games before COVID-19 postponed the season.

=== Return to Portimonense S.C. ===
In December 2021, Patterson returned to Portimonense. He was the team's second-leading scorer, averaging 14.3 points, 4.9 rebounds, and 1.5 assist on a blistering 64.1% shooting inside the arc in under 25 minutes a game.

=== Teuta ===
On December 6, 2022, Patterson made his debut with Teuta of the Albanian basketball Superleague. Patterson helped Teuta to victory in the Albanian basketball cup and led all scorers with 29 points.

=== The Basketball Tournament ===
Patterson has played in The Basketball Tournament (TBT), an annual winner-take-all single-elimination tournament. In 2023, he played for Virginia Dream.

== National team career ==
=== 3x3 basketball ===
Patterson is Jamaican American, with Jamaican-born parents and plays for the Jamaica men's national 3x3 team. In 2023, he deputed for Team Jamaica in the 3x3 International Cup, which is set to be hosted at Golden 1 Centre in Sacramento starting on October 1.
