= Caraun Reid =

American football player (born 1991)

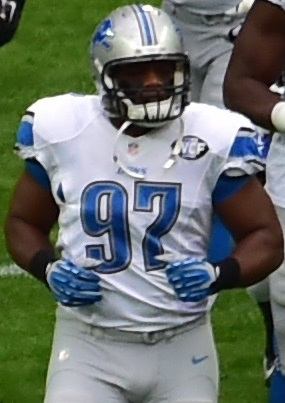
- Reid with the Detroit Lions in 2014.

No. 97, 91, 55, 51, 94, 92
- Position: Defensive tackle

Personal information
- Born: November 23, 1991 (age 34); The Bronx, New York, U.S.
- Listed height: 6 ft 2 in (1.88 m)
- Listed weight: 292 lb (132 kg)

Career information
- High school: Mount Saint Michael Academy (The Bronx, New York)
- College: Princeton
- NFL draft: 2014: 5th round, 158th overall pick

Career history
- Detroit Lions (2014–2015); San Diego Chargers (2016); Detroit Lions (2017); Washington Redskins (2017); Indianapolis Colts (2017); Dallas Cowboys (2018); Indianapolis Colts (2019)*; Arizona Cardinals (2019); Jacksonville Jaguars (2020); Carolina Panthers (2021)*; Tennessee Titans (2021); Los Angeles Chargers (2021)*; DC Defenders (2023)
- * Offseason or practice squad member only

Awards and highlights
- Third-team FCS All-American (2012, 2013); First-team All-Ivy League (2011, 2012, 2013)

Career NFL statistics
- Total tackles: 55
- Sacks: 3.5
- Forced fumbles: 1
- Fumble recoveries: 2
- Pass deflections: 2
- Defensive touchdowns: 2
- Stats at Pro Football Reference

Caraun Reid (born November 23, 1991) is an American former professional football player who was a defensive tackle in the National Football League (NFL). He played college football for the Princeton Tigers and was selected by the Detroit Lions in the fifth round of the 2014 NFL draft. He was also a member of 8 other NFL teams, and the DC Defenders.

== Early life ==
Reid was born on November 23, 1991, in the Bronx, New York. He is the son of Courton, the Bishop of City of Faith Church of God in the Bronx, a school principal, and psychologist, and Claudette Reid, also a minister, hematologist, and licensed educator. Reid has two older brothers Caryl and CaVar.

Reid attended Mount Saint Michael Academy in The Bronx, New York. Named two-time team captain, he earned all-league honors twice and all-city and all-state honors as a senior. He was the winner of the school's Monsignor Matthew Peters student-athlete award, and was a member of the National Honor Society and the National Society of High School Scholars.

He was considered a two-star recruit by Rivals.com.

== College career ==
His academic excellence led him to Princeton University, where he played for the Tigers from 2009 to 2013. In 2009, recorded 34 tackles, most among all Princeton freshmen, and added 4.5 tackles for loss, four pass breakups and a sack. In 2010, Reid played in only one game before suffering a season-ending injury. In 2011, he earned first-team All-Ivy League honors after leading all Ivy League linemen with 68 tackles, including 29 solo stops. He led Princeton in tackles for loss (16), sacks (eight), pass breakups (three), quarterback hurries (three) and blocked kicks (three). In 2012, he earned third-team FCS All-American honors by the Associated Press, after recording 40 tackles, including 9.5 for losses, 5.5 sacks and three blocked kicks. He also earned unanimous first-team All-Ivy League honors on the defensive line. In 2013, he was named a finalist for the Ivy League Defensive Player of the Year honors. He earned his third straight first-team All-Ivy League honor, only the fourth player in Princeton history to earn the honor three times. He recorded 26 tackles, including 11 for loss, 6.5 sacks, one interception and one blocked kick.

== Professional career ==
=== Detroit Lions (first stint) ===
Reid was selected by the Detroit Lions in the fifth round (158th overall) of the 2014 NFL draft. Reid had a quiet rookie season with 2 tackles and a pass defended in 12 games. In 2015 against the Seattle Seahawks, Reid returned a Russell Wilson fumble 27 yards for a touchdown, cutting the score to 13-10. However, the Lions would lose on a controversial call. Reid also recorded 29 tackles and 2 sacks during 14 games played in 2015. On September 3, 2016, Reid was waived by the Lions after the preseason.

=== San Diego Chargers ===
The San Diego Chargers claimed Reid off waivers on September 4, 2016. In his first week with the team, Reid recorded a sack. In week 3, Reid recorded his second career touchdown by recovering another fumble and returning it 61 yards for a score. Despite scoring off of the Andrew Luck fumble, Reid and the chargers lost a close game against the Colts. In Week 7 against the Atlanta Falcons, Reid injured his ACL and was placed on injured reserve on October 25, 2016.

On September 2, 2017, Reid was waived by the Chargers.

=== Detroit Lions (second stint) ===
On October 11, 2017, Reid signed with the Lions. He was released on October 18, 2017.

=== Washington Redskins ===
On November 14, 2017, Reid signed with the Washington Redskins. On December 4, 2017, Reid was waived by the Redskins.

=== Indianapolis Colts (first stint) ===
On December 18, 2017, Reid signed with the Indianapolis Colts. He was released on August 18, 2018.

=== Dallas Cowboys ===
On August 20, 2018, Reid was signed by the Dallas Cowboys to replace an injured Richard Ash. He received praise from head coach Jason Garrett, a fellow Princeton alumnus, but was released on September 1. He was re-signed on September 25, to replace an injured Datone Jones. Reid played in 10 games for the Cowboys mostly as a backup defensive tackle, including one start against the Atlanta Falcons in place of an injured Antwaun Woods. He collected 14 tackles (one for loss), half a sack, 10 quarterback pressures and the first forced fumble of his career. He wasn't re-signed after the season.

=== Indianapolis Colts (second stint) ===
On June 10, 2019, Reid signed with the Colts. He was released on August 30, 2019.

=== Arizona Cardinals ===
Reid was signed by the Arizona Cardinals on December 4, 2019. He wasn't re-signed after the season.

=== Jacksonville Jaguars ===
On August 10, 2020, Reid signed with the Jacksonville Jaguars. He was released on September 5, 2020, and re-signed to the practice squad. He was elevated to the active roster on October 10 for the team's week 5 game against the Houston Texans, and reverted to the practice squad after the game. He was promoted to the active roster on October 12, 2020. He was waived on November 14, 2020, and re-signed to the practice squad three days later. On December 5, 2020, Reid was promoted to the active roster. He wasn't re-signed after the season.

=== Carolina Panthers ===
On May 24, 2021, Reid signed with the Carolina Panthers. He was released on August 24, 2021.

=== Tennessee Titans ===
On October 5, 2021, Reid was signed to the Tennessee Titans practice squad. On November 1, 2021, Reid as released from the practice squad.

=== Los Angeles Chargers ===
On November 17, 2021, Reid was signed to the Los Angeles Chargers practice squad. His contract expired when the teams season ended on January 9, 2022.

=== DC Defenders ===
On February 4, 2023, Reid was signed by the DC Defenders. He was released on December 13, 2023.
