= Homer Smith (American football) =

American football player and coach (1931–2011)

Biographical details
- Born: October 9, 1931; Omaha, Nebraska, U.S.
- Died: April 10, 2011 (aged 79); Tuscaloosa, Alabama, U.S.

Playing career
- 1951–1953: Princeton
- Position: Fullback

Coaching career (HC unless noted)
- 1957: Stanford (JV)
- 1958–1959: Stanford (freshmen)
- 1960: Stanford (backfield)
- 1961–1964: Air Force (backfield)
- 1965–1969: Davidson
- 1970–1971: Pacific (CA)
- 1972–1973: UCLA (OC)
- 1974–1978: Army
- 1980–1986: UCLA (OC)
- 1987: Kansas City Chiefs (OC)
- 1988–1989: Alabama (OC)
- 1990–1993: UCLA (OC)
- 1994–1995: Alabama (OC)
- 1996–1997: Arizona (OC)

Head coaching record
- Overall: 53–71–1
- Bowls: 0–1

Accomplishments and honors

Championships
- 1 SoCon (1969)

Awards
- First-team All-Eastern (1952, 1953)

Homer Austin Smith (October 9, 1931 – April 10, 2011) was an American football player and coach. He served as the head football coach at Davidson College (1965–1969), the University of the Pacific (1970–1971), and the United States Military Academy (1974–1978), compiling a career college football record 53–71–1 and a bowl record of 0–1. Smith was also the offensive coordinator at the University of California, Los Angeles (1972–1973, 1980–1986, 1990–1993), the University of Alabama (1988–1989, 1994–1995), and the University of Arizona (1996), and for the Kansas City Chiefs of the National Football League (NFL). In 1997, Smith was a finalist for the Broyles Award, given annually to the nation's top college football assistant coach.

Smith was named 1977 Eastern College Conference Coach of the Year and was presented an Outstanding Achievement Award by the American Football Coaches Association in 2006. As a player, he was a two-time All-East and All-Ivy League fullback at Princeton University. As a coach, Smith has his most success as offensive coordinator at UCLA where he paired with Terry Donahue to lead the Bruins to multiple Rose Bowls and top ten finishes.

In addition to his undergraduate degree from Princeton, he also received post-graduate degrees from Stanford Business School and Harvard Divinity School.

Smith died in 2011.

== Head coaching record ==
Year	Team	Overall	Conference	Standing	Bowl/playoffs
Davidson Wildcats (Southern Conference) (1965–1969)
1965	Davidson	6–4	2–3	T–5th	
1966	Davidson	4–5	2–3	5th	
1967	Davidson	4–5	1–5	8th	
1968	Davidson	3–6	1–3	6th	
1969	Davidson	7–4	5–1	T–1st	L Tangerine
Davidson:		24–24	11–15		
Pacific Tigers (Pacific Coast Athletic Association) (1970–1971)
1970	Pacific	5–6	2–3	T–4th	
1971	Pacific	3–8	1–4	6th	
Pacific:		8–14	3–7		
Army Cadets (NCAA Division I / I-A independent) (1974–1978)
1974	Army	3–8			
1975	Army	2–9			
1976	Army	5–6			
1977	Army	7–4			
1978	Army	4–6–1			
Army:		21–33–1			
Total:		53–71–1			
