= Gene Filipski =

American football player (1931–1994)

No. 40, 80, 86, 20
- Position: Halfback

Personal information
- Born: June 14, 1931; Webster, Massachusetts, U.S.
- Died: August 23, 1994 (aged 63); Calgary, Alberta, Canada
- Listed height: 5 ft 11 in (1.80 m)
- Listed weight: 185 lb (84 kg)

Career information
- High school: Grant Union (Sacramento, California)
- College: Army (1949–1950); Villanova (1952–1953)
- NFL draft: 1953: 7th round, 83rd overall pick

Career history
- Cleveland Browns (1954)*; New York Giants (1956–1957); Calgary Stampeders (1958–1961)
- * Offseason or practice squad member only

Awards and highlights
- NFL champion (1956); WIFU All-Star (1959); First-team All-American (1952); 2× First-team All-Eastern (1952, 1953); 1954 Senior Bowl MVP

Career NFL statistics
- Rushing yards: 174
- Rushing average: 5
- Receptions: 4
- Receiving yards: 44
- Total touchdowns: 1
- Stats at Pro Football Reference

Eugene C. Filipski (June 14, 1931 – August 23, 1994) was a professional gridiron football halfback who played two seasons with the New York Giants of the National Football League (NFL) and four seasons with the Calgary Stampeders of the Western Interprovincial Football Union (WIFU).

== Early life and college ==
Eugene C. Filipski was born on June 14, 1931, in Webster, Massachusetts. He attended Grant Union High School in Sacramento, California.

He first played college football at the United States Military Academy from 1949 to 1950 and lettered in 1950. He transferring to Villanova University for the 1952 to 1953 seasons, and was a letterman both years. He was a first-team All-American in 1952, and was the MVP of the Senior Bowl Game in 1954.

Filipski served in the United States Marine Corps.

== Professional career ==
He was drafted 83rd overall by the Cleveland Browns in the seventh round of the 1953 NFL draft and signed with the Browns on January 7, 1954. He was traded to the New York Giants just prior to the start of the 1956 season. In the 1956 NFL Championship Game, Filipski returned the opening kickoff 54 yards, setting the tone for the Giants convincing 47–7 victory over the Chicago Bears.

He was released by the Giants in 1958 and signed with the Calgary Stampeders of the Western Interprovincial Football Union (WIFU). He was a WIFU All Star in 1959. He retired after the 1961 season.

== Later life ==
Filipski died on August 23, 1994, in Calgary, Alberta, Canada.
