= Brad Myers (American football) =

American football player (born 1930)

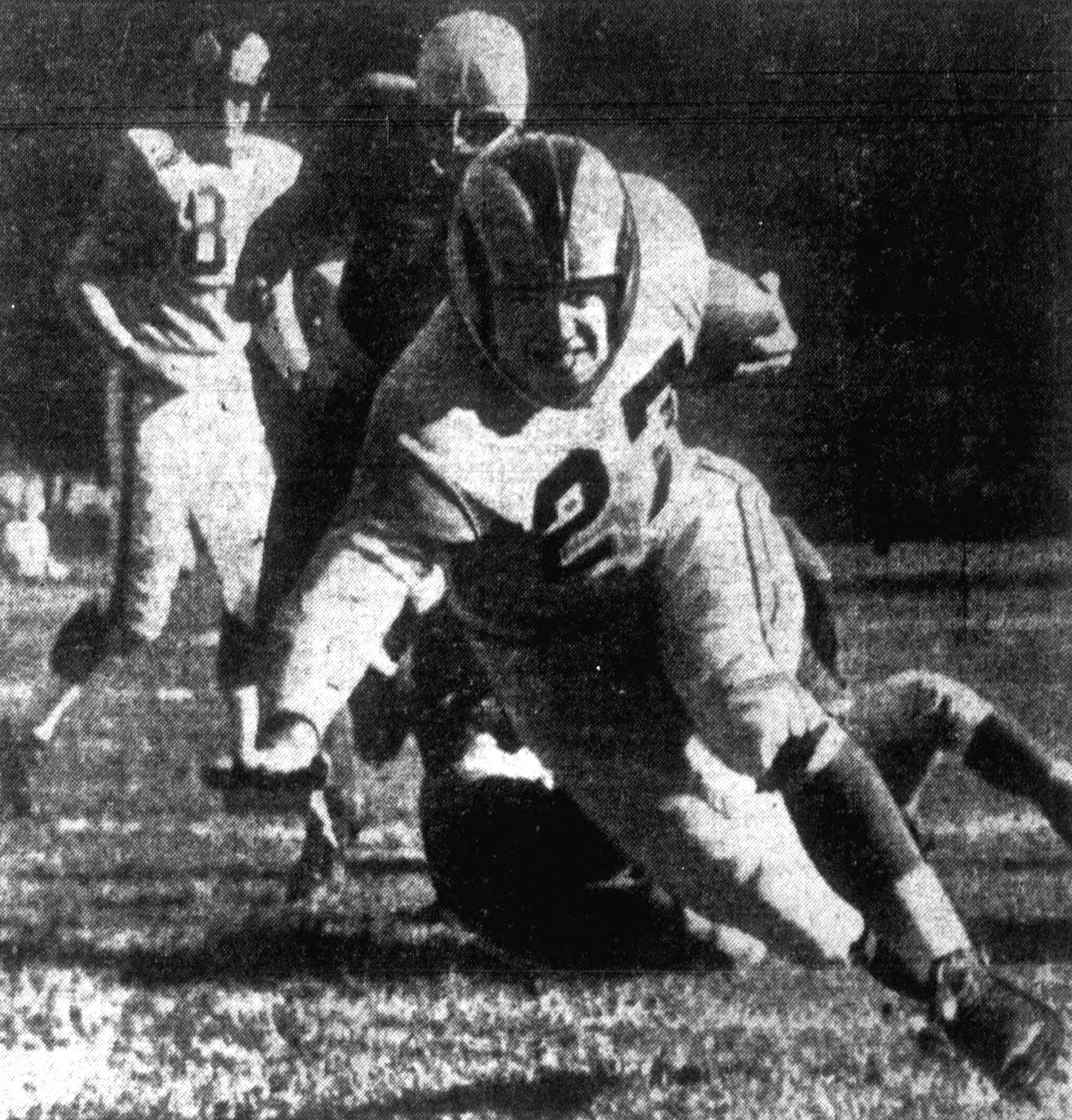
- Meyers on October 18, 1953

No. 27, 28, 46
- Positions: Halfback, end

Personal information
- Born: February 14, 1930 (age 96); Lancaster, Pennsylvania, U.S.
- Listed height: 6 ft 1 in (1.85 m)
- Listed weight: 197 lb (89 kg)

Career information
- High school: Mercersburg Academy (Mercersburg, Pennsylvania)
- College: Bucknell
- NFL draft: 1953: 9th round, 108th overall pick

Career history
- Los Angeles Rams (1953, 1956); Pittsburgh Steelers (1957)*; Philadelphia Eagles (1958)
- * Offseason or practice squad member only

Awards and highlights
- Second-team All-Eastern (1951)

Career NFL statistics
- Rushing yards: 180
- Rushing average: 3.3
- Receptions: 8
- Receiving yards: 38
- Total touchdowns: 3
- Stats at Pro Football Reference

Bradford James Myers (born February 14, 1930) is an American former professional football player who was a halfback for the Los Angeles Rams and Philadelphia Eagles. of the National Football League (NFL). He played college football for the Bucknell Bison, having previously attended Mercersburg Academy. In 2022, was living in Makaha, Hawaii.
