= 1951 All-Eastern football team =

American all-star college football team

The 1951 All-Eastern football team consists of American football players chosen by various selectors as the best players at each position among the Eastern colleges and universities during the 1951 college football season.

== Offensive selections ==
=== Backs ===
- Dick Kazmaier, Princeton (AP-1; UP-1)
- Harry Agganis, Boston University (AP-1; UP-1)
- Charles Maloy, Holy Cross (AP-1; UP-1)
- Burt Talmage, Bucknell (AP-1; UP-1)
- Mitch Prince, Columbia (AP-2; UP-2)
- Johnny Turco, Holy Cross (AP-2; UP-2)
- Brad Myers, Bucknell (AP-2)
- Bob Haner, Villanova (AP-2)
- Hal Seidenberg, Cornell (UP-2)
- Bob Bestwick, Pittsburgh (UP-2)

=== Ends ===
- Karl Kluckhohn, Colgate (AP-1; UP-1)
- Tom McCann, Holy Cross (AP-1; UP-2)
- Wesley Bomm, Columbia (AP-2)
- Robert Capuano, Holy Cross (AP-2)

=== Tackles ===
- Paul Tetreault, Navy (AP-1; UP-1)
- Charles Metzler, Cornell (AP-1)
- Robert Evans, Penn (AP-2)
- Charles Deen, Yale (AP-2)

=== Guards ===
- Gerald Audette, Columbia (AP-1; UP-2)
- John Pietro, Brown (AP-1)
- Frank Vitale, Cornell (AP-2)
- James Otis, Princeton (AP-2)

=== Centers ===
- William Vesprini, Dartmouth (AP-1; UP-2)
- Albert Lemay, Harvard (AP-2)

== Defensive selections ==
=== Defensive ends ===
- Frank McPhee, Princeton (AP-1; UP-1)
- Eddie Bell, Penn (AP-1; UP-2)
- Tom Hanlon, Penn (AP-2)
- William Owens, Colgate (AP-2)

=== Defensive tackles ===
- Gerald McGinley, Penn (AP-1; UP-2)
- John Feltch, Holy Cross (AP-2; UP-1)
- George Young, Bucknell (AP-1)
- James Jerome, Cornell (AP-2; UP-2)

=== Defensive guards ===
- Nick Liotta, Villanova (AP-1; UP-1)
- Victor Bihl, Princeton (AP-1; UP-1)
- Bradley M. Glass, Princeton (AP-2; UP-2)
- Chet Millett, Holy Cross (AP-2)

=== Defensive center ===
- David Hickok, Princeton (AP-1; UP-1)
- Edward Sexton, Brown (AP-2)

=== Defensive backs ===
- Robert Spears, Yale (AP-1)
- William Whelan, Cornell (AP-1)
- Richard Pivirotto, Princeton (AP-1)
- Frank Hauff, Navy (AP-1)
- Bob Albert, Bucknell (AP-2)
- William Kirk, Cornell (AP-2)
- Avatus Stone, Syracuse (AP-2)
- Donald Fuqua, Army (AP-2)

== Key ==
- AP = Associated Press
- UP = United Press

== See also ==
- 1951 College Football All-America Team
