= Henry Ford (defensive back) =

American football player (1931–2021)

No. 46, 95, 24
- Positions: Halfback, defensive back

Personal information
- Born: November 1, 1931; Homestead, Pennsylvania, U.S.
- Died: June 10, 2021 (aged 89); Palo Alto, California, U.S.
- Listed height: 6 ft 0 in (1.83 m)
- Listed weight: 180 lb (82 kg)

Career information
- High school: Schenley (Pittsburgh, Pennsylvania)
- College: Pittsburgh
- NFL draft: 1955: 9th round, 109th overall pick

Career history
- Cleveland Browns (1955); Toronto Argonauts (1955); Pittsburgh Steelers (1956)

Awards and highlights
- NFL champion (1955); First-team All-Eastern (1952); Second-team All-Eastern (1954)

Career NFL statistics
- Rushing yards: 27
- Rushing average: 1.9
- Receptions: 3
- Receiving yards: 7
- Total touchdowns: 2
- Stats at Pro Football Reference

Henry "Model T" Ford (November 1, 1931 – June 10, 2021) was an American professional football defensive back for the Cleveland Browns and Pittsburgh Steelers of the NFL. He played college football as a quarterback for the University of Pittsburgh.

== College career ==
Ford played quarterback for Pittsburgh, and was the first African-American to play that position at a major college.

== Professional career ==
After being drafted, he spent the 1955 season with the Browns and 1956-57 with the Steelers. He was cut by the Steelers in 1957 after it was learned that he was dating a white woman. It was brought to the Rooney's attention and after refusing to stop dating her, he was released. Ford was never able to clear out his locker or talk to his teammates. He never went public with the details of what happened at the time because he felt it would not do any good. That girlfriend, Rochelle, ended up being his wife for 52 years. He was awarded the Pittsburgh Pro Football Hall of Fame's President's Award in 2015 for "displaying superior courage, integrity and professionalism beyond the playing field". Ford died on June 10, 2021.
