= Mireya Robles =

American Writer and Critic

Mireya Robles (born 1934) is a Cuban American writer and literary critic.

== Biography ==
Robles was born in Guantánamo, she was educated in Cuba where she attended the Institute of Guantánamo and the University of Havana. She immigrated to the United States in 1957, and continued her studies at the Russell Sage College. She received her master's degree from the State University of New York at Albany and was awarded her doctorate from the State University of New at Stony Brook. She has held numerous teaching positions and currently divides her time between South Africa and the United States.

She writes novels, prose, and short stories as well as literary criticism. Some of her works have been translated. Her literary work makes it one of the main exponents of magical realism, especially present in her novel La muerte definitiva de Pedro el Largo (1998), which has been compared with Pedro Páramo (1955), by Juan Rulfo. Her main work, Hagiography of Narcisa the Beautiful (1985), is an exercise in literary virtuosity written in a single paragraph and supposes a feminist and subversive critique, full of black humour. It is seen to specifically critique the role of the family, the machismo that imposes heteropatriarchy, the social pressure of the community and the Church. In addition, it introduces elements about homosexuality and gender identity. In this sense, Mireya Robles has also stood out for her active criticism of the situation of homosexuals in Cuba, and the defense of those who were sent to the United States during the Exodus of Mariel (Mariel Boatlift), as seen in the documentary Improper Conduct, directed by Orlando Jiménez Leal and Néstor Almendros in 1984.

== Awards and honours ==
Robles was awarded the First Prize of the Iberoamerican Poets and Writers Guild in 1971, and the gold medal of the Academie Internationale de Lutèce in 1974. In 1989, she was a finalist for the Spanish literature award, the Nadal Prize.

== Works ==
- Combinado del este. Novel
- Trisagio de la muerte. Short stories
- Frigorífico del este. Short stories
- Petits poèmes, 1969. Poetry
- Tiempo artesano. Barcelona: Campos, 1973. Poetry
- 'En esta aurora. Xalapa: Universidad Veracruzana, 1976. Poetry
- Hagiografía de Narcisa la bella, 1985 (reed. Recalcitrantes, Madrid 2016; ISBN 978-84-945472-1-8). Novel tr. as Hagiography of Narcisa the Beautiful (trans. Anna Diegel), Readers International (1996) ISBN 1-887378-03-0
- Profecía y luz en la poesía de Maya Islas, 1987. Criticism
- Una mujer y otras cuatro, 1989. Novel
- La muerte definitiva de Pedro el Largo, 1998. Novel
