= Pete Vann =

American football quarterback (1933–2010)

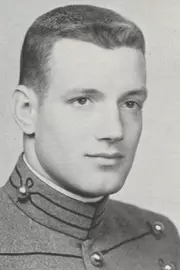
- Vann at West Point

No. 10
- Position: Quarterback

Personal information
- Born: June 29, 1933
- Died: May 30, 2010 (aged 76); Kerrville, Texas, US

Career information
- College: Army (1952–1954)

Peter Joel Vann (June 29, 1933 – May 30, 2010) was an American football player. He was the starting quarterback for the Army Cadets football from 1952 to 1954, during which time he broke the program's records for, among others, passing yardage (2,937) and passing touchdowns (24). As a senior, he was a second-team All-American, led the country with a 166.5 passing efficiency rating, set an NCAA single-season record with an average of 23.2 yards per completion, and ranked eighth nationally with 1,097 yards of total offense.

== Early life ==
Vann was born in 1933 and raised in Hamburg, New York. He attended Hamburg High School where he was an all-around athlete. In December 1950, while playing for the school's basketball team, he contracted spinal meningitis. He was hospitalized for approximately six weeks until the end of January 1951.

== Army ==
Vann enrolled at the United States Military Academy at West Point, New York, in 1951. He was Army's quarterback from 1952 to 1954, playing under head coach Earl Blaik and offensive coordinator Vince Lombardi (through the 1953 season). While at West Point, Vann broke the program's career passing records with 372 passes, 174 completions, 2,937 passing yards, and 24 touchdown passes.

=== 1953 season ===
As a junior, Vann led the 1953 Army Cadets football team to the Lambert Trophy with a 7–1–1 record. He led the country in completion percentage for much of that season. He received second-team honors from the Associated Press (AP) and International News Service on the 1953 All-Eastern football team.

=== 1954 season ===
As a senior in 1954, Vann led the 1954 Army team to a 7–2 record and a No. 7 ranking in the AP and UPI polls. His personal accomplishments during the 1954 season included leading the country with a 166.5 passing efficiency rating, setting an NCAA single-season record with an average of 23.2 yards per completion, and ranking eighth nationally with 1,097 yards of total offense. His total of 1,098 yards of total offense was the highest in the Eastern Intercollegiate Football Association during the 1954 season.

After Vann threw touchdown passes of 67, 44, and 61 yards in a 60-6 victory over Dartmouth in October 1954 (the Cadets' most dominant victory since 1949), the Associated Press called Vann "a slick quarterback with an arm like Willie Mays." Dartmouth coach Tuss McLaughry said of Vann: "In 35 years of my observation of Army elevens I must rate Vann as the finest quarterback at the Point. He is a master ball-handler and is unexcelled at the long pass."

After an upset victory over Michigan in 1954, Vann's teammates carried him off the field on their shoulders. The Detroit Free Press wrote: "Pete Vann ... was the brightest star in the Army line-up. He had the Michigan line off balance and guessing the entire contest." Michigan head coach Bennie Oosterbaan said: "Vann is as good a quarterback as we will see this season. He's a slick ball handler and calls plays very well."

At the end of the 1954 season, Vann received multiple honors, including the following:

- Vann received 20 first-place votes and ranked ninth overall in the 1954 Heisman Trophy voting.
- He was selected as the second-team quarterback by the International News Service (INS) and Central Press on the 1954 All-America team. He also received third-team All-America honors from the United Press (UP).
- He received first-team honors from the Associated Press (AP) and INS on the 1954 All-Eastern football team. He was named to the second team by the UP. Vann was the unanimous first-team choice of the AP which wrote: "He's a strong-armed passer who can heave the ball 75 yards, a mystifying faker in the tradition of Army quarterbacks, a poised signal caller and a solid defensive player."

In December 1954, he appeared on the cover of Sport magazine with the headline, "As Vann Goes, So Goes The Army."

== Family and later years ==
Vann married Mary Bettis Quinby in June 1956. They were married for more than 55 years, had four children, and lived in Indiana. He died from lung cancer in May 2010. He was posthumously inducted into the Army Sports Hall of Fame in September 2010. He was buried at Fort Sam Houston National Cemetery in San Antonio, Texas.
