= Sage College of Albany =

Private college in Albany, New York, U.S.

Coordinates: 42°39′5.58″N 73°47′0.92″W

- Former names: Russell Sage College Albany Division; Sage Junior College of Albany; Sage Evening College
- Type: Private
- Active: 1949–2020
- Academic staff: 150 (2019)
- Students: 850 (2019)
- Location: 140 New Scotland Avenue, Albany, New York, 12208, United States

Sage College of Albany, SCA for short, was located at 140 New Scotland Avenue, Albany, New York. Along with Russell Sage College and the Sage Graduate School, it was one of the three colleges that made up The Sage Colleges. In 2020, SCA became the Russell Sage's Albany campus.

== History ==
In 1949 Russell Sage College for women in Troy, New York, opened a coeducational Albany Division. Intended to serve the large number of veterans returning from World War II, state government workers, and others seeking an education related to workplace needs, the Russell Sage College Albany Division offered associate, bachelor's, and master's degrees in an evening schedule to an audience of working adults. The first classes were offered in buildings located in downtown Albany.

President Lewis Froman received approval in 1957 to establish a "private junior college" operating on a daytime schedule in the same buildings. In the summer of 1959, the college purchased a portion site of the Albany Home for Children (later Parson's Child and Family Center, now Northern Rivers Family Center) at New Scotland and Academy Roads. A year later, the entire Albany Division moved to the new campus, continuing to coexist in the same buildings with daytime and evening schedules. In 1962, the Junior College of Albany received its own degree-granting power, and subsequently, associate degrees were awarded through JCA.

During the 1970s, art and design became the signature programs for JCA and earned NASAD accreditation. For many years, the evening division continued to offer bachelor's and master's degrees under the charter of Russell Sage College. During the 1980s, the umbrella institution began to be known as The Sage Colleges. The two-year college was called Sage Junior College of Albany and the evening division was called the Sage Evening College and Sage Graduate School. In 1995, these names were formalized and the Sage Graduate School received separate degree-granting powers.

Responding to the wishes of SJCA students to remain at Sage for four years, the rising credentials needed for entry-level professional positions, and the emerging workplace needs of the 21st century, Sage Junior College of Albany and Sage Evening College were replaced by a single four-year entity, Sage College of Albany in 2001.

Due to declining enrollment and a high debt load, Sage College's board of directors voted unanimously in March 2019 to merge the three colleges under the name Russell Sage College. SCA became Russell Sage's Albany campus beginning in the fall of 2020.

== Campus ==
Sage College was located at 140 New Scotland Avenue in Albany, New York. Its on-campus, coed residence hall provided living space for approximately 100 first-year students in good academic standing (over 2.00 GPA.) About 80% of Sage College first-year students lived in college housing. After the first year, students could move into University Heights College Suites, a student housing complex with apartment-style living.

== Academics ==
=== Degrees ===
The college's popular majors for bachelor's degrees were:

- Visual and Performing Arts: 23%
- Business: 17%
- Law & Society (Law, Psychology, Sociology, Criminology): 7%
- Nursing: 6%
- Education: 6%
- Accounting: 5%

It was also home to Sage After Work, which offers a variety of bachelor's degrees in a format designed specifically for adult learners. It offered bachelor's degrees, with the largest programs being Visual Arts, Management and the interdisciplinary Law & Society. SCA students often took courses on the Russell Sage College campus in Troy, New York, or accelerated into one of the master's programs in the Sage Graduate School.

=== Honors ===
The college had a chapter of Alpha Sigma Lambda, an honor society for non-traditional students.

=== Demographics ===
850 students were enrolled at SCA, and it shared approximately 150 faculty members with the other Sage colleges. About 66% of the student body were female.

== Athletics ==
Sage College of Albany fielded intercollegiate teams at the Division III level in basketball, soccer, tennis, and golf.

== Campus life ==
Sage College of Albany was a dry campus. The college offered many organizations for their students to participate in. They included:

- AIGA
- Anime Club
- American Institute of Graphic Arts (A.I.G.A.)
- American Society of Interior Designers (ASID)
- Association of Campus Events (A.C.E.)
- Dance Club
- The Emeralds
- Film Club
- Gay Straight Alliance
- Kitchen & Bath Design Club
- The Navigators
- Psychology & Law Club
- Residence Hall Council
- Running Club
- Science Club
- Student Government Association
- Vernacular
- Video Game Club
