= Gertrude Heidenthal =

American geneticist

- Heidenthal, from the 1930 yearbook of Mount Holyoke College
- Born: June 9, 1908; Carbondale, Pennsylvania, U.S.
- Died: January 29, 1993 (aged 84); Troy, New York, U.S.
- Occupations: Geneticist, zoologist, college professor
- Known for: Studies of radiation and mutations in insects

Gertrude A. Heidenthal (June 9, 1908 – January 29, 1993) was an American geneticist, zoologist, and biology professor at Russell Sage College. She studied rodents, fruit flies, and wasps, and the ways radiation induces mutations.

== Early life and education ==
Heidenthal was born in Carbondale, Pennsylvania, and raised in Middletown, New York, the daughter of Warren C. Heidenthal and Etta M. Tuthill Heidenthal. Her father was a railroad engineer. She graduated from Mount Holyoke College in 1930. She earned a Ph.D. at the University of Chicago. In 1947 she was elected president of the Eastern New York Mount Holyoke Alumnae Club.

== Career ==
Heidenthal taught at Wellesley College early in her career, and was a research assistant at the Rockefeller Institute for Medical Research. She was a biology professor and researcher at Russell Sage College beginning in 1945; she was promoted to full professor status in 1963. She also did research on radiation at Union College, the Marine Biological Laboratory and Brookhaven National Laboratory. She spoke at and attended conferences of the Atomic Energy Commission, the Genetics Society of America, the American Association for the Advancement of Science, the New York Academy of Sciences, and the Radiation Research Society. She also spoke to community groups about "the Atomic Age". Heidenthal retired from Russell Sage College with emeritus status in 1972. The biology department established a scholarship in her name.

== Publications ==
- "A Colorimetric Study of Genic Effect on Guinea-Pig Coat Color" (1940)
- "Imperforate in the Mouse, Its Inheritance and Relation to Endocrine Function" (1942, with John W. Gowen)
- "Materials for the Study of the Position Effect of Normal and Mutant Genes" (1944, with Curt Stern)
- "The Occurrence of X-Ray Induced Dominant Lethal Mutations in Habrobracon" (1945)
- "Embryonic Lethals Induced by X-Irradiation of First Meiotic Metaphase Oocytes of Habrobracon" (1946, with Curt Stern and Elizabeth White Schaeffer)
- "Genetic Effects of X-Rays and Cathode Rays on Oocytes of Habrobracon" (1960)
- "Embryonic Lethals Induced by X-Irradiation of First Meiotic Metaphase Oocytes of Habrobracon" (1962)
- "Fecundity and Longevity of F_{1} Females of Habrobracon from Sperm X-rayed with 3000r" (1972, with Wayne Nelson and Leonard Clark)
