= Frank McPhee (American football) =

American football player (1931–2011)

No. 89
- Positions: Defensive back, End

Personal information
- Born: March 19, 1931; Youngstown, Ohio, U.S.
- Died: March 31, 2011 (aged 80); Cleveland, Ohio, U.S.
- Listed height: 6 ft 3 in (1.91 m)
- Listed weight: 195 lb (88 kg)

Career information
- High school: Chaney (Youngstown)
- College: Princeton (1949–1952)
- NFL draft: 1953: 13th round, 147th overall pick

Career history
- Chicago Cardinals (1955)

Awards and highlights
- National champion (1950); Consensus All-American (1952); First-team All-American (1951); 2× First-team All-Eastern (1951, 1952)
- Stats at Pro Football Reference

Frank Melvin McPhee (March 19, 1931 – March 31, 2011) was an American professional football player who played one season with the Chicago Cardinals of the National Football League (NFL). He was selected by the Cardinals in the thirteenth round of the 1953 NFL draft after playing college football at Princeton University. He was a consensus All-American in 1952.

== Early life ==
Frank Melvin McPhee was born on March 19, 1931, in Youngstown, Ohio. He participated in football, basketball, and golf at Chaney High School in Youngstown, graduating in 1949. He earned All-City, All-Mahoning County and All-Ohio honors in football, and All-Ohio honors in basketball.

== College career ==
McPhee was a member of the Princeton Tigers of Princeton University from 1949 to 1952. He was a three-year letterman from 1950 to 1952 as an offensive end and defensive back. The 1950 Tigers were named national champions by the Poling System and the Boand System. He caught three passes for 69 yards and one touchdown in 1951. For the 1951 season, he earned Football Writers Association of America first-team All-American, International News Service first-team All-American, United Press (UP) second-team All-American, Central Press Association third-team All-American, Associated Press (AP) first-team All-Eastern, and UP first-team All-Eastern honors. He was a consensus All-American in 1952. McPhee was named first-team All-Eastern by the AP and UP in 1952 as well. Princeton only lost one game from 1950 to 1952. McPhee was a team captain his senior year in 1952. He majored in religion at Princeton.

== Professional career ==
McPhee was selected by the Chicago Cardinals in the 13th round, with the 148th overall pick, of the 1953 NFL draft. However, he then served a stint in the United States Marines. He garnered Armed Forces Press Service first-team all-service team recognition in 1953 as an end. McPhee finally signed with the Cardinals in 1955. He played in seven games, starting one, for the team during the 1955 season. He missed part of the year due to injury. McPhee was released in 1956.

== Personal life ==
McPhee worked for Prudential Insurance in Houston Texas after his football career, before retiring to his hometown of Youngstown. On March 31, 2011, he died of kidney failure at the Cleveland Clinic.
