= Eddie Bell (halfback) =

American football player (1931–2009)

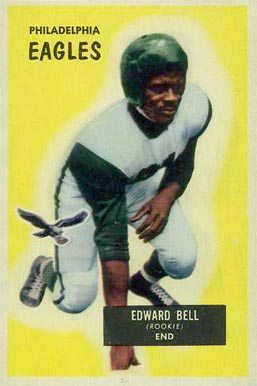
- Bell on a 1955 Bowman football card

No. 81, 77, 25
- Positions: Defensive back, halfback, linebacker

Personal information
- Born: March 25, 1931; Philadelphia, Pennsylvania, U.S.
- Died: November 16, 2009 (aged 78); Philadelphia, Pennsylvania, U.S.
- Listed height: 6 ft 1 in (1.85 m)
- Listed weight: 222 lb (101 kg)

Career information
- High school: West Philadelphia
- College: Penn (1949–1952)
- NFL draft: 1953: 5th round, 57th overall pick

Career history
- Philadelphia Eagles (1955–1958); Hamilton Tiger-Cats (1959); New York Titans (1960)

Awards and highlights
- CFL East All-Star (1959); 2× First-team All-American (1951, 1952); 2× First-team All-Eastern (1951, 1952); Second-team All-Eastern (1950)

Career NFL/AFL statistics
- Interceptions: 11
- Fumble recoveries: 6
- Total touchdowns: 1
- Stats at Pro Football Reference

Edward B. Bell (March 25, 1931 – November 16, 2009) was an American professional football player. A halfback, he played college football for the Penn Quakers. Professionally, he played for the National Football League (NFL)'s Philadelphia Eagles from 1955 through 1958, and for the New York Titans of the American Football League (AFL) in 1960. He was selected 57th overall in the fifth round by the Eagles in the 1953 NFL Draft.

Bell played one season in the Canadian Football League (CFL) in 1959 with the Hamilton Tiger-Cats and was selected as an All-Star at linebacker.

== See also ==
- List of American Football League players
