= 1952 All-Eastern football team =

American all-star college football team

The 1952 All-Eastern football team consists of American football players chosen by various selectors as the best players at each position among the Eastern colleges and universities during the 1952 college football season. The United Press (UP) selected a single team of 11 players. The Associated Press (AP) and Players' All-Eastern teams were divided into separate offensive and defensive teams.

The 1952 Princeton Tigers football team was ranked No. 19 in the final AP Poll and led the All-Eastern selections with four first-team honorees. End Frank McPhee was selected as a first-team All-Eastern player and was also a consensus first-team All-American. Princeton's honorees also included fullback Homer Smith and guard Bradley M. Glass.

The 1952 Pittsburgh Panthers football team was ranked No. 15 in the final United Press poll and had three first-team honorees. Linebacker Joe Schmidt was later inducted into the Pro Football Hall of Fame. Pitt's other honorees were tackle Eldred Kraemer and defensive back Henry Ford.

The 1952 Syracuse Orangemen football team was ranked No. 14 in the final AP Poll, higher than any other Eastern Team. The Orangemen placed three players on the All-Eastern first team, including back Pat Stark.

== Backs ==
- Gene Filipski, Villanova (APO [hb], UP-1 [hb], PO)
- Charles Maloy, Holy Cross (APO [qb], UP-1 [qb])
- Homer Smith, Princeton (APO [fb], UP-1, PO)
- Richard Clasby, Harvard (APO [hb])
- Pat Stark, Syracuse (UP-1 [hb])
- Albert Simmons, Colgate (APD, PD)
- Edgar Janotta, Princeton (APD)
- Joseph Fortunato, Yale (APD)
- Harry Agganis, Boston University (PO)
- Mitch Price, Columbia (PO)
- Henry Ford, Pittsburgh (PD)
- Tom Murphy, Holy Cross (PD)

== Ends ==
- Frank McPhee, Princeton (APD, UP-1, PO)
- Eddie Bell, Penn (APD, UP-1, PD)
- Ed Woodsum, Yale (APO, PO)
- Al Ward, Columbia (APO)

== Tackles ==
- Eldred Kraemer, Pittsburgh (APO, UP-1, PD)
- Bob Fleck, Syracuse (APD, UP-1, PO)
- William Hegarty, Villanova (APO, PD)
- Vic Rimkus, Holy Cross (PO)
- John Shanafelt, Penn State (APD)

== Guards ==
- Steven Eisenhauer, Navy (APD, UP-1, PD)
- Chet Millett, Holy Cross (APO, UP-1)
- Bill Skyinskus, Syracuse (APO)
- Bradley M. Glass, Princeton (APD)
- Joe Pertel, Navy (PO)
- Pete Carrieri, Villanova (PO)
- Pete Reich, Dartmouth (PD)

== Center ==
- Jim Dooley, Penn State (APO, PLO)

== Linebackers ==
- Joe Schmidt, Pittsburgh (APD, UP-1 [c])
- Pete Schoderbek, Penn State (APD, PO)
- Tony Correnti, Navy (PD)

== Key ==
- AP = Associated Press
- UP = United Press
- PO/PD = Players All-East offensive and defensive teams, selected by opponents who faced them during the season's football games

== See also ==
- 1952 College Football All-America Team
