= Eliza Kellas =

American educator

Eliza Kellas (October 4, 1864 – April 10, 1943) was an American educator most known as former principal of Emma Willard School and co-founder of Russell Sage College.

== Early years ==
Kellas was born on October 4, 1864, near Moores Forks in Franklin County, New York. She attended school in Mooers and Malone and began teaching at Malone in 1880 at the age of 16.

In 1887, Kellas began studies at Potsdam Normal School (now known as State University of New York at Potsdam) in Potsdam, New York. She graduated two years later and joined the faculty to teach in the Preparatory Department. Kellas left Potsdam in 1891 to accept a position as principal of the school of practice at Plattsburgh Normal School (now known as State University of New York at Plattsburgh) in Plattsburgh, New York. In 1895 she was named preceptress (equivalent to dean of students). In the late 1890s, Kellas studied briefly at University of Michigan and Sorbonne in Paris.

Kellas resigned from Plattsburgh after 10 years to become a governess to fellow a fellow pioneer in women's education in America, Mary Lyon. Kellas and Lyon traveled widely together between 1901 and 1905, when she entered Radcliffe College in Cambridge, Massachusetts. She graduated from Radcliffe in 1910.

== Years in Troy ==
In February 1911, Kellas took the position of headmistress at Emma Willard School in Troy, New York, at the recommendation of Agnes Irwin, the recently retired Dean of Radcliffe College. Emma Willard had just moved to a new campus, the gift of Margaret Olivia Sage. The school's standards and reputation had veered from its founder's original vision and Kellas was charged with restoring those high standards of scholarship and deportment. Kellas worked tirelessly toward these goals, stressing science education for women. She also raised enough alumnae funds to construct several new buildings on campus. Within a few years, she helped make the Emma Willard one of the leading institutions of its kind in the country.

Under the leadership of Kellas, Emma Willard School expanded by reactivating the old campus in September 1916. The expansion was named Russell Sage College of Practical Arts, and was devoted to vocational training for young women. While remaining Principal at Emma Willard, Kellas became the first Dean of Russell Sage, as well as serving as the first President of the college. The year following Russell Sage's founding, Kellas secured a separate charter for the school from the New York State Board of Regents and they granted their first degrees in 1920. Through Kellas' efforts, Russell Sage became an independently chartered educational institution in 1927.

Kellas retired as Dean and President of Russell Sage College in 1928 and devoted her services entirely to Emma Willard School. She retired from Emma Willard School in 1942.

Kellas died in 1943 in Troy and is buried in Oakwood Cemetery.

== Honors ==
- Kellas Hall on the campus of Emma Willard School was named in honor of Eliza Kellas. Completed in 1927, it was the second student residence on campus.
- Kellas Hall on the campus of SUNY Potsdam was named in honor of Eliza Kellas. It is home to the school's physics department, since Kellas stressed science in women's education.
- Kellas Hall on the campus of Russell Sage College was named in honor of Eliza Kellas. It is a dormitory for freshman women.
