= 1954 All-Eastern football team =

American all-star college football team

The 1954 All-Eastern football team consists of American football players chosen by various selectors as the best players at each position among the Eastern colleges and universities during the 1954 college football season.

== Quarterbacks ==
- George Welsh, Navy (UP-1, INS-2)
- Pete Vann, Army (AP-1 [b], UP-2, INS-1)
- Cornelius Salvaterra, Pitt (AP-2)

== Halfbacks ==
- Lenny Moore, Penn State (AP-1 [b], UP-1, INS-1)
- Tommy Bell, Army (AP-2, UP-1, INS-1)
- Royce Flippin, Princeton (AP-1 [b], UP-2, INS-2)
- Henry Ford, Pitt (UP-2, INS-2)
- Raymond Perkins, Syracuse (AP-2)

== Fullbacks ==
- Sam Pino, Boston University (AP-1 [b], UP-1, INS-2)
- Pat Uebel, Army (UP-2, INS-1)
- Charles Sticka, Trinity (AP-2)

== Ends ==
- Ron Beagle, Navy (AP-1, UP-1, INS-1)
- Don Holleder, Army (AP-1, UP-1, INS-1)
- James Garrity, Penn State (AP-2, UP-2)
- Andy Nacrelli, Fordham (AP-2, INS-2)
- Jim Castle, Penn (UP-2)
- Jesse Arnelle, Penn State (INS-2)

== Tackles ==
- Frank Morze, Boston College (AP-1, UP-1, INS-2)
- Eldred Kraemer, Pitt (UP-2, INS-1)
- Otto Kneidinger, Penn State (AP-1)
- Rosey Grier, Penn State (UP-1)
- Phil Tarasovic, Yale (INS-1)
- Leonard Oniskey, Cornell (AP-2)
- Lou Palatella, Pitt (AP-2)
- Hugh Webster, Navy (UP-2)
- Paul Kernaklian, Syracuse (INS-2)

== Guards ==
- Bill Meigs, Harvard (AP-1, UP-1, INS-2)
- Ralph Chesnauskas, Army (AP-1, UP-1)
- Leonard Benzi, Navy (AP-2, INS-1)
- John Henn, Princeton (INS-1)
- Jim Van Buren, Cornell (UP-2, INS-2)
- Louis Lovely, Boston University (AP-2)
- Thorne Shugart, Yale (UP-2)

== Center ==
- Bill Chance, Army (UP-1, INS-2)
- Charles Beemus, Colgate (AP-1)
- Frank Reich, Penn State (INS-1)
- James Doughan, Yale (AP-2)
- Ed Bose, Pitt (UP-2)

== Key ==
- AP = Associated Press
- UP = United Press
- INS = International News Service

== See also ==
- 1954 College Football All-America Team
