= Nick Liotta =

American football player (1928–1951)

Profile
- Positions: Guard, Linebacker

Personal information
- Born: January 28, 1928; Everett, Massachusetts
- Died: November 28, 1951 (aged 23); Radnor Township, Delaware County, Pennsylvania
- Listed height: 5 ft 11 in (1.80 m)
- Listed weight: 225 lb (102 kg)

Career information
- High school: Everett (MA)
- College: Villanova

Awards and highlights
- First-team All-American (1951); First-team All-Eastern (1951)

Domenic A. "Nick" Liotta (January 28, 1928 – November 28, 1951) was an American football player.

A native of Everett, Massachusetts, he attended Villanova University, where he played college football as a guard and linebacker. He developed a reputation as a 60-minute player and served as co-captain of Villanova's 1951 football team. He was selected by the Football Writers Association of America as a first-team guard and by the Chicago Tribune (based on votes of fellow players) as a first-team linebacker on their respective 1951 College Football All-America Teams.

Prior to the end of the 1951 season, and shortly after accepting an invitation to play in the East–West Shrine Game, Liotta committed suicide by hanging himself with telephone wire from a pipe in the basement of his dormitory. He was reported to have been ill and depressed prior to his suicide. Villanova cancelled the final game of the season following Liotta's suicide. Liotta had returned three days earlier from a loss against LSU in Louisiana, and some called for curtailing extensive travel schedules for college athletes, noting that Liotta was "dog tired" from the travel, playing 60 minutes a game, and maintaining the highest academic ranking of any player on the Villanova team.
