= Andy Nacrelli =

American football player (1933–1991)

No. 87
- Position: End

Personal information
- Born: August 15, 1933; Chester, Pennsylvania, U.S.
- Died: September 14, 1991 (aged 58); Pennsylvania, U.S.
- Listed height: 6 ft 1 in (1.85 m)
- Listed weight: 190 lb (86 kg)

Career information
- High school: St. James
- College: Fordham
- NFL draft: 1955: 12th round, 142nd overall pick

Career history
- Hamilton Tiger-Cats (1955); Philadelphia Eagles (1958)

Awards and highlights
- Second-team All-Eastern (1954)

Career NFL statistics
- Receptions: 2
- Receiving yards: 15
- Stats at Pro Football Reference

Andrew Nacrelli (August 15, 1933 – September 14, 1991) was an American professional football player who was an end in the National Football League (NFL). He played college football for the Fordham Rams.

== College career ==
Nacrelli played end and punter for the Fordham Rams. He had 29 receptions for 428 yards and three touchdowns in his junior season. As a senior, he was named team MVP, All-Catholic All-American, second-team All-East after catching 25 passes for 493 yards and two touchdowns in what would be the team's last varsity season until 1970. After the season Nacrelli played in the 1955 Senior Bowl.

== Professional career ==
Nacrelli was selected 142nd overall by the Philadelphia Eagles in the 12th round of the 1955 NFL draft. He signed with the Hamilton Tiger-Cats, and spent the 1955 season with the team. Following the season he was drafted into the US Army. He was stationed at Fort Sam Houston, where he was a member of the base's football team and was named to the Army Times All-Army Team in 1957. Nacrelli joined the Eagles following his discharge in 1958 and played in two games with the team, starting both and catching two passes for 15 yards. He was released by the Eagles on October 21, 1958.

== Post-football ==
After retiring from professional football, Nacrelli became a high school teacher and football coach at Darby-Colwyn High School. He moved to Lake Oswego, Oregon in 1971. Nacrelli died September 14, 1991. He was posthumously inducted into the Fordham Athletic Hall of Fame in 2009 and the Delaware County Chapter of the Pennsylvania Sports Hall of Fame in 2015.
