= Russell Sage College =

Private college in Troy, New York, US

Coordinates: 42.72845°N 73.69283°W

- Motto: Esse Scire Facere "To Be. To Know. To Do."
- Type: Private
- Established: 1916; 110 years ago
- Endowment: $46 million (2024)
- President: Matthew R. Shaftel
- Provost: Theresa Hand
- Academic staff: 109 FT/ 20 PT (2023)
- Students: 2,790 (2024)
- Undergraduates: 1,241 (2024)
- Postgraduates: 1,535 (2024)
- Location: Albany, New York, U.S.
- Campus: 10 acres (4.0 ha)
- Colors: (Green & blue)
- Nickname: Gators
- Sporting affiliations: Empire 8 (NCAA Division III)
- Mascot: Sage Gator
- Website: sage.edu
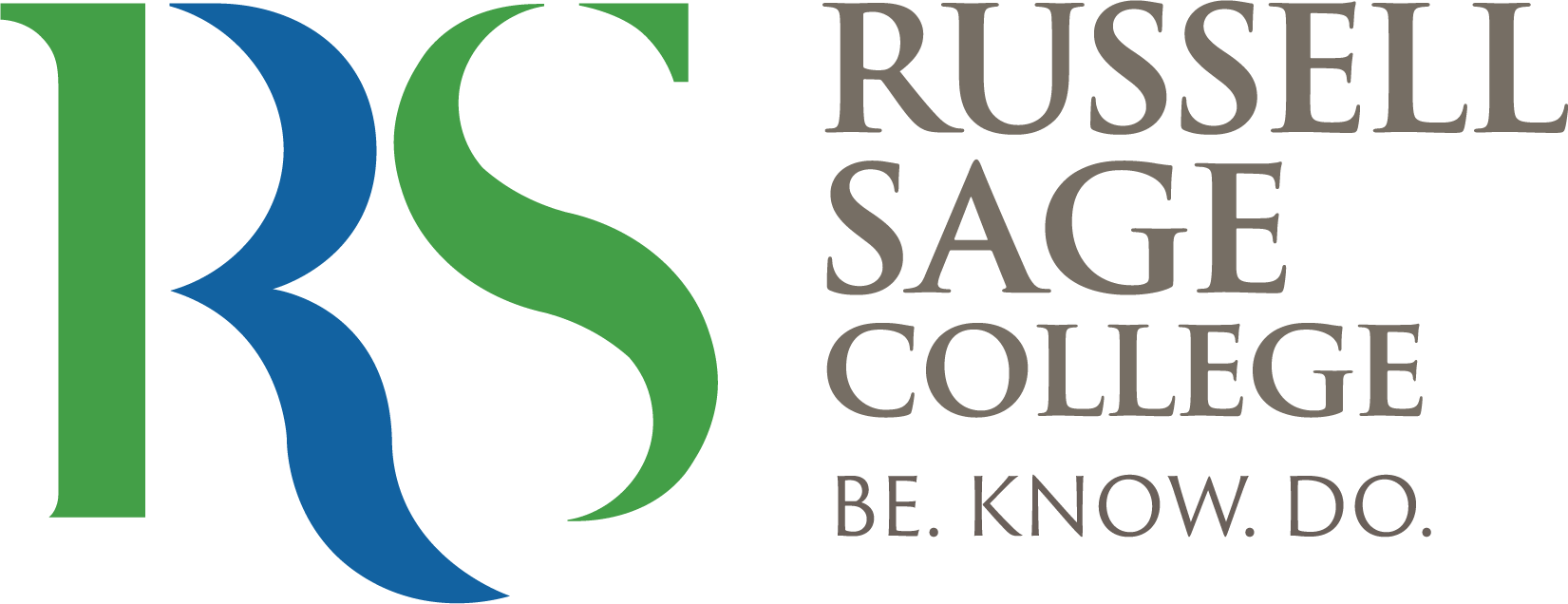

Russell Sage College (often Russell Sage or RSC) is a co-educational college with two campuses located in Albany and Troy, New York, approximately 150 miles (240 km) north of New York City in the Capital District. Russell Sage College offers both undergraduate and graduate degree and certificate programs. As of 2024, 2,790 students are enrolled, with 1,241 undergraduate students and 1,535 graduate students.

== History ==
RSC was founded in 1916 by Margaret Olivia Slocum Sage, a suffragist, as a "school of practical arts." She named the college after her husband, Russell, who was an American financier, railroad executive and Congressman from New York. With Eliza Kellas, head of the Emma Willard School, Mrs. Sage was active in the women's suffrage movement; in founding the new college, they proposed to offer women the means of independence through the combination of broad education in the liberal arts with preparation for specific professional careers. Initially, the college operated under the charter of the Emma Willard School, granting its first baccalaureate degree in 1918 and graduating its first class in 1920. In 1927, the New York State Board of Regents granted a separate charter for Russell Sage College and reaffirmed the status of Emma Willard as a secondary school.

During World War II, an "emergency men's division" was created, and in 1942 the first graduate degree was conferred. In 1949, an Albany Division was opened, offering two-year, four-year and graduate degrees under the charter of Russell Sage College and extending the college's mission to include the education of men on the second campus. Sage Junior College of Albany received its own degree-granting powers in 1957. In 1995, Sage Graduate School became authorized to grant degrees independently, Sage Evening College became recognized as a separate administrative unit, and the institution was re-chartered by the Board of Regents of the state of New York as The Sage Colleges, often referred to for the sake of convenience as "Sage." The words Russell Sage College refer only to the college for women. In 2001, Sage Junior College of Albany and Sage Evening College were replaced by a single entity, Sage College of Albany.

With a charter change effective July 1, 2020 and beginning with that year's fall semester, Russell Sage College, Sage College of Albany, and Sage Graduate Schools united under a single name, also Russell Sage College, one college with two co-educational campuses in Albany and Troy, New York.

In April 2025, it was announced that Russell Sage College would merge with Albany College of Pharmacy and Health Sciences in a gradual process that is planned to be completed by Fall 2027.

== Campus ==
Russell Sage College

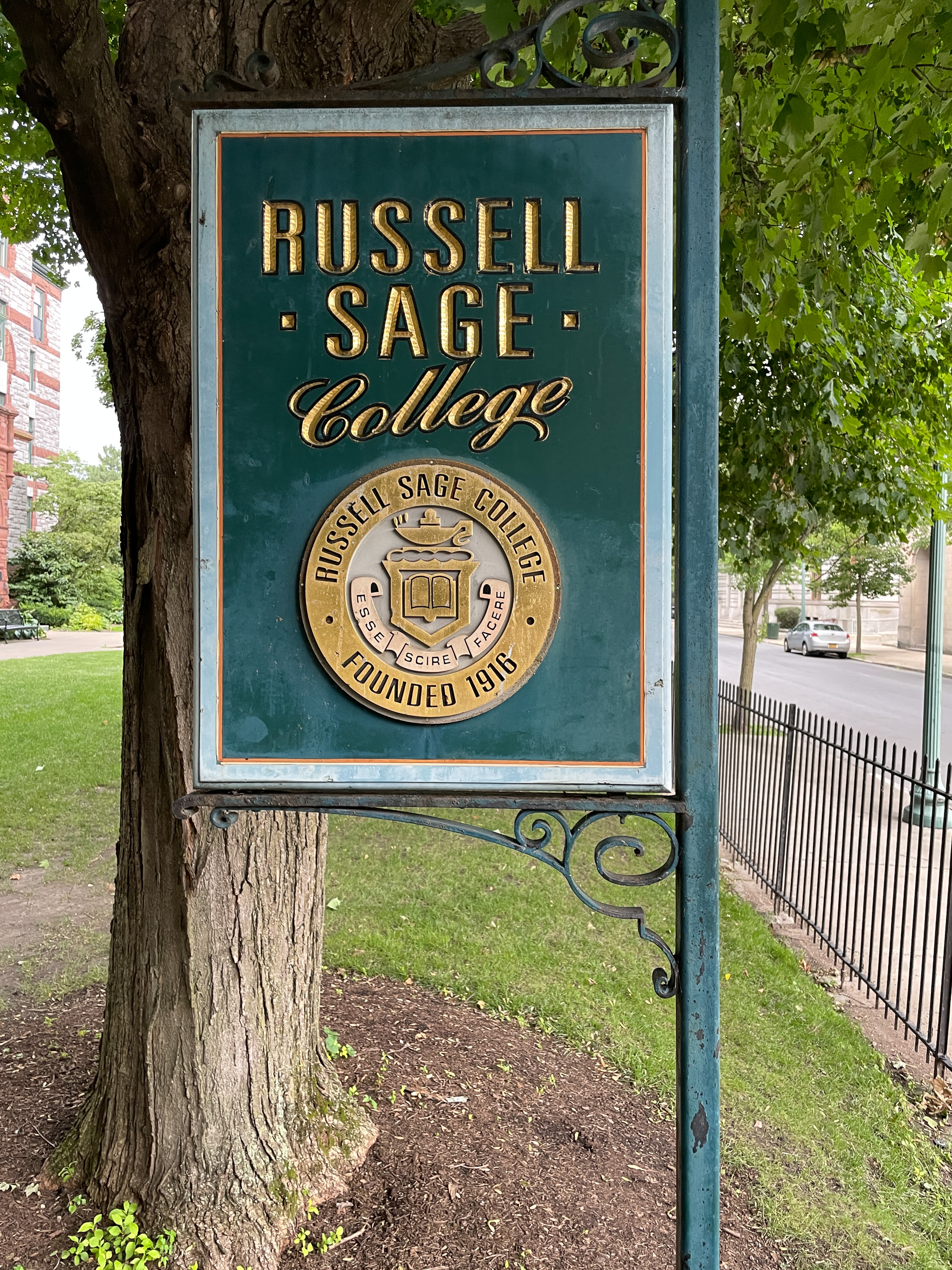
Sign

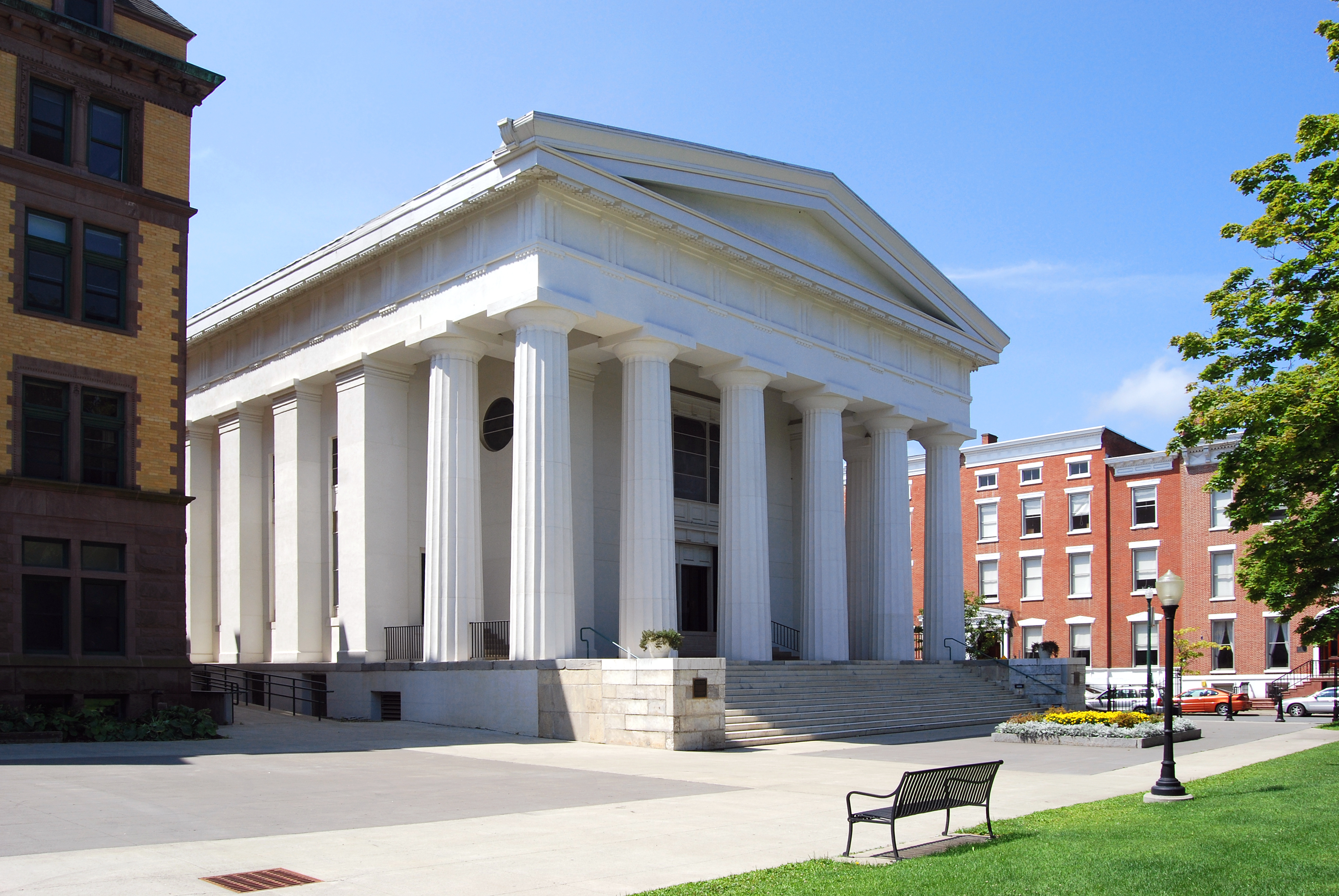
Bush Center

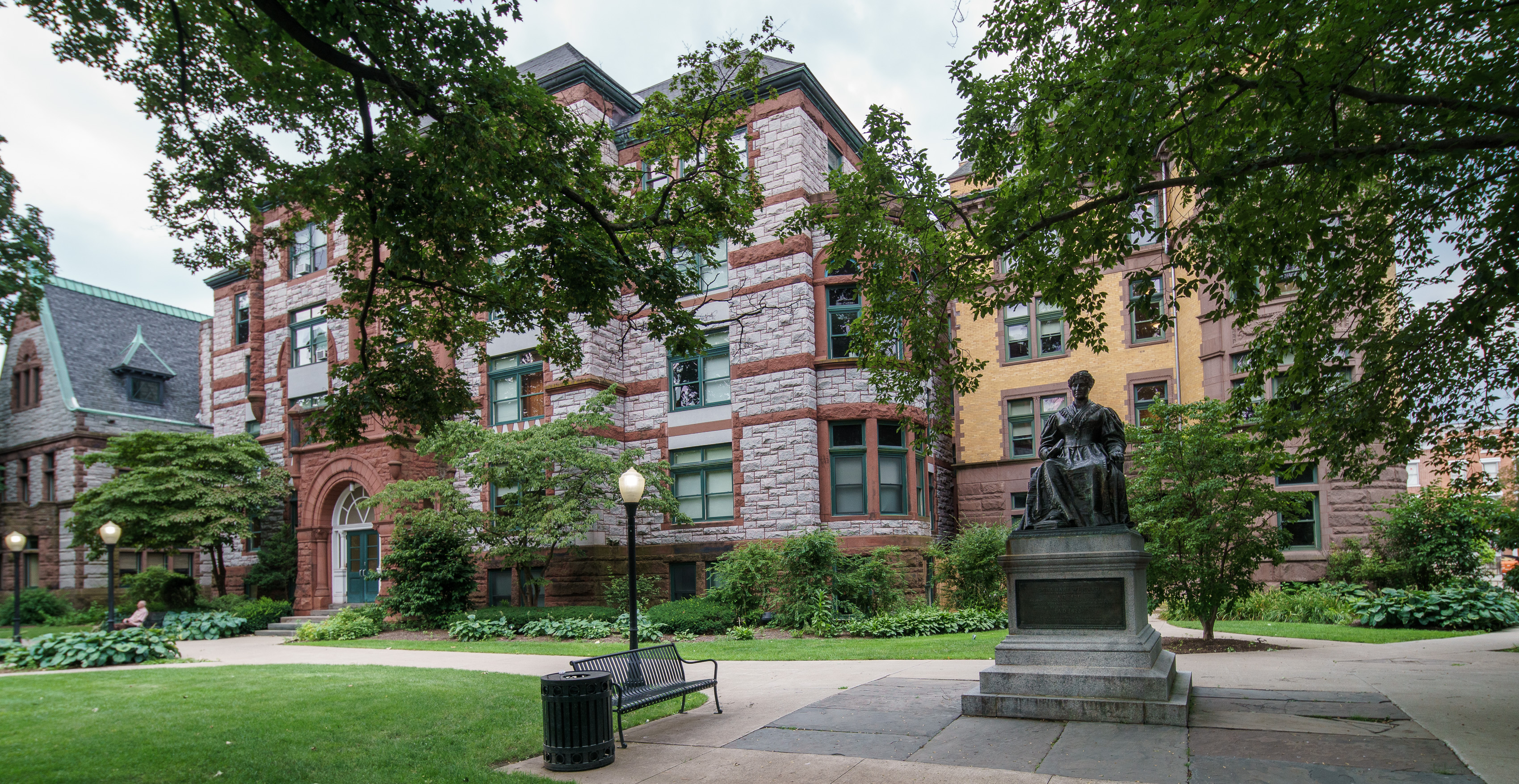
Robison Common

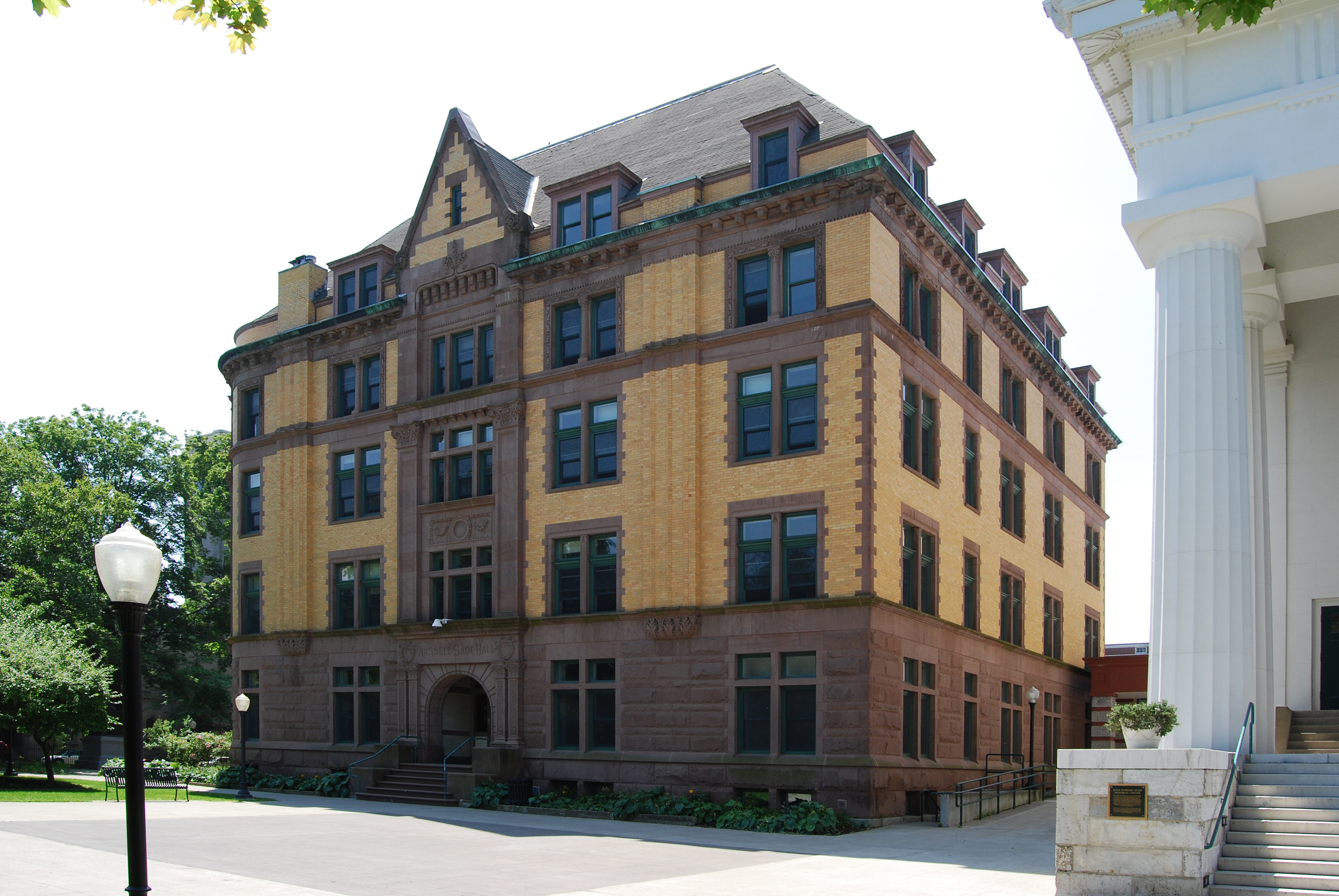
Russell Sage Hall

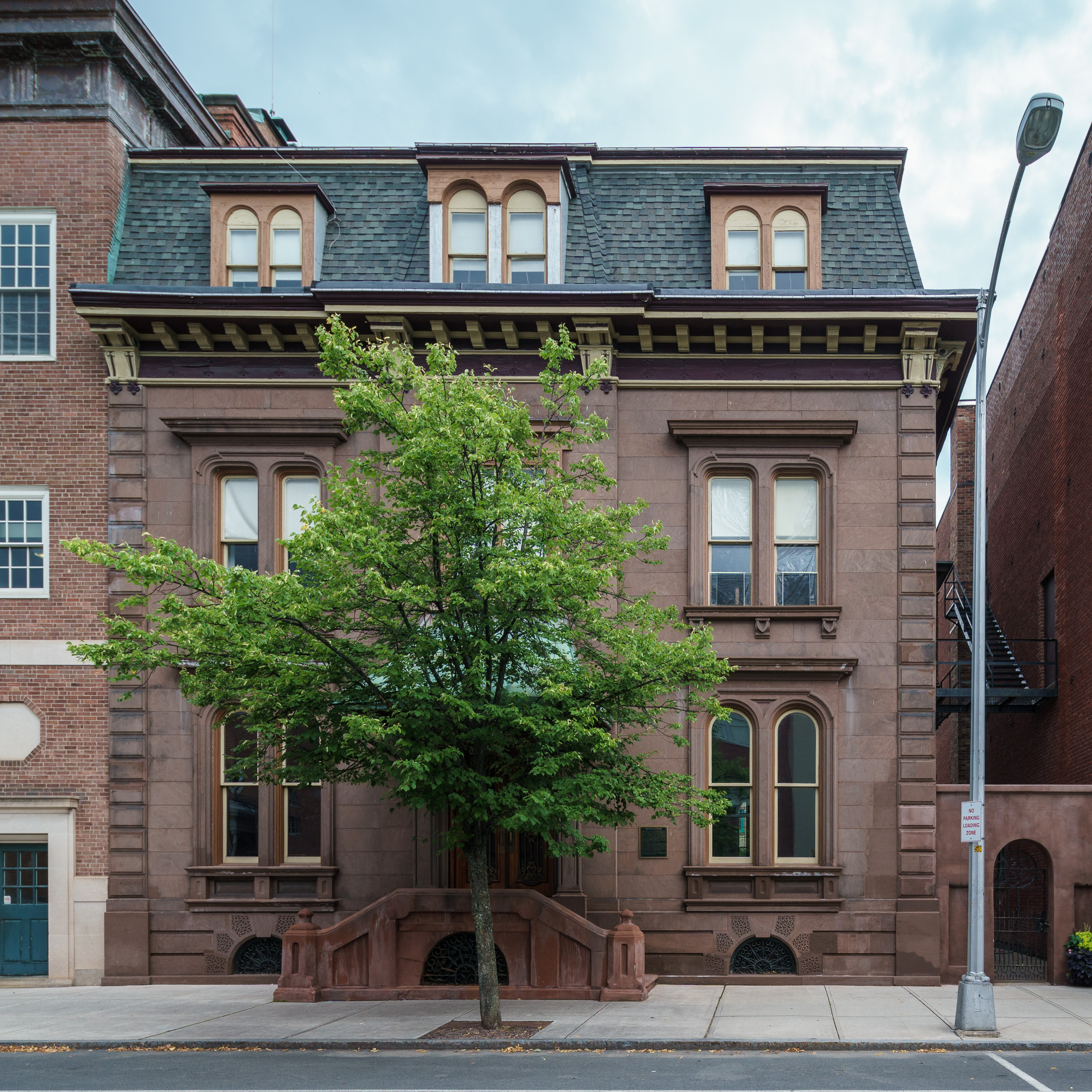
French House

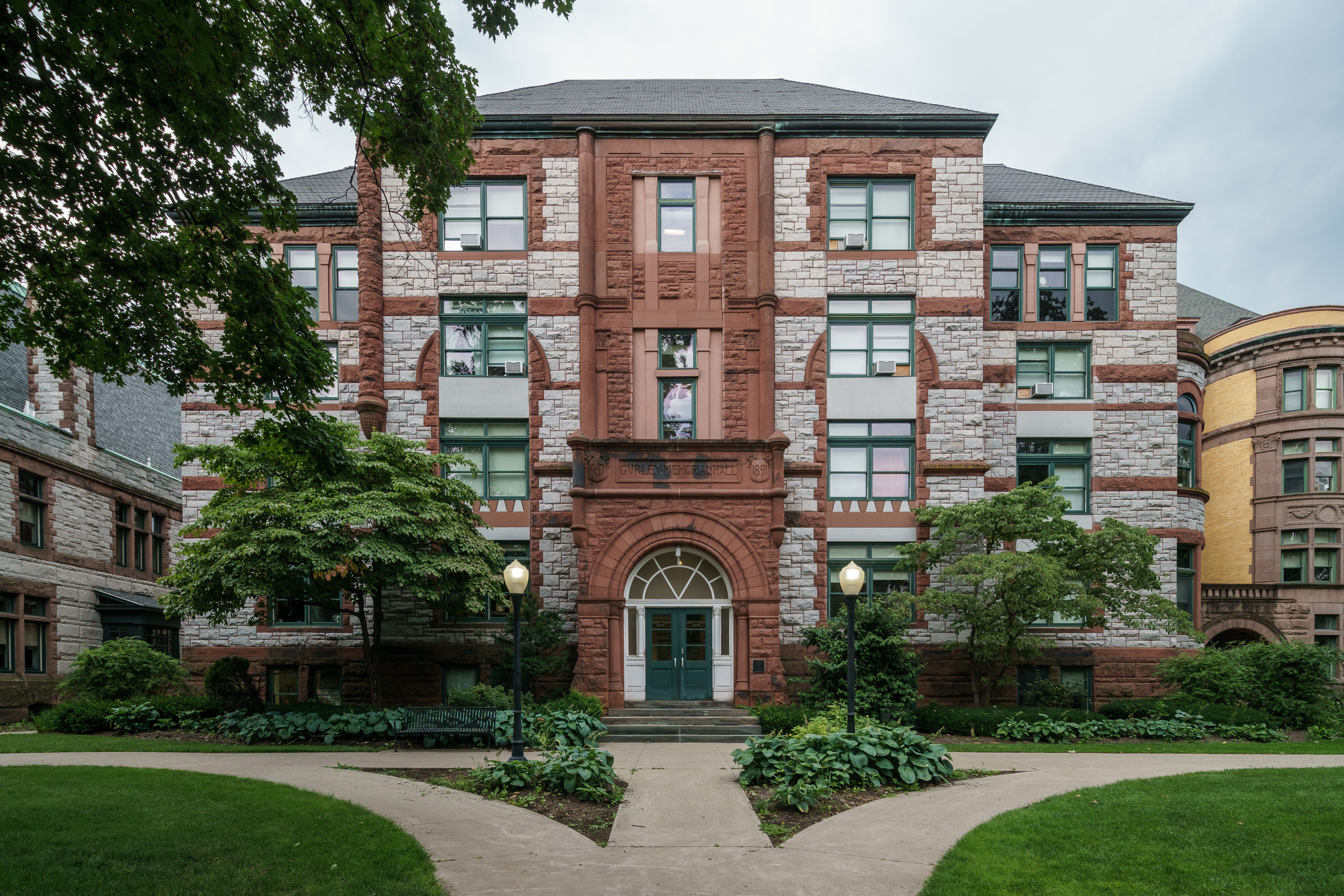
Gurley Memorial Hall

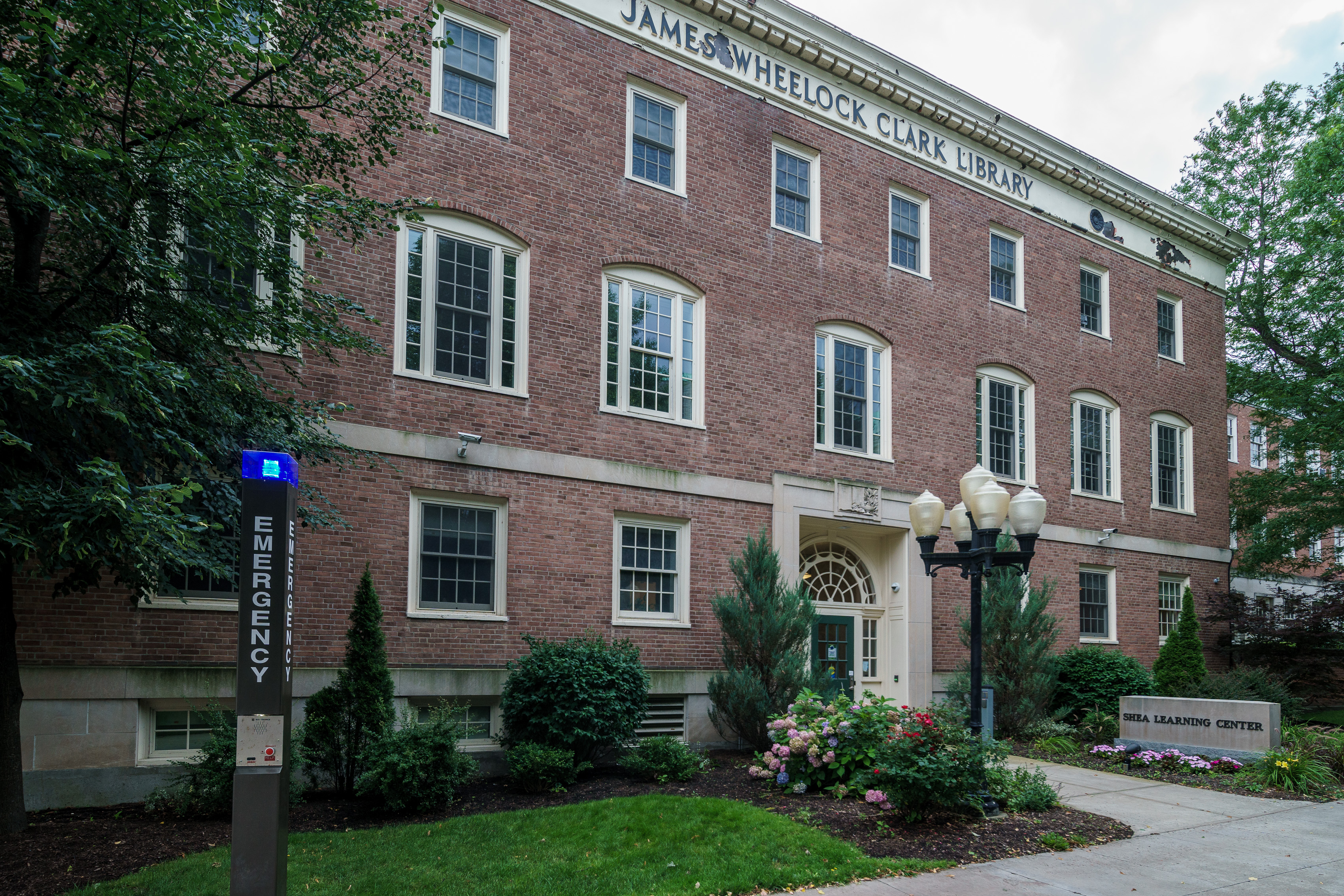
James Wheelock Clark Library

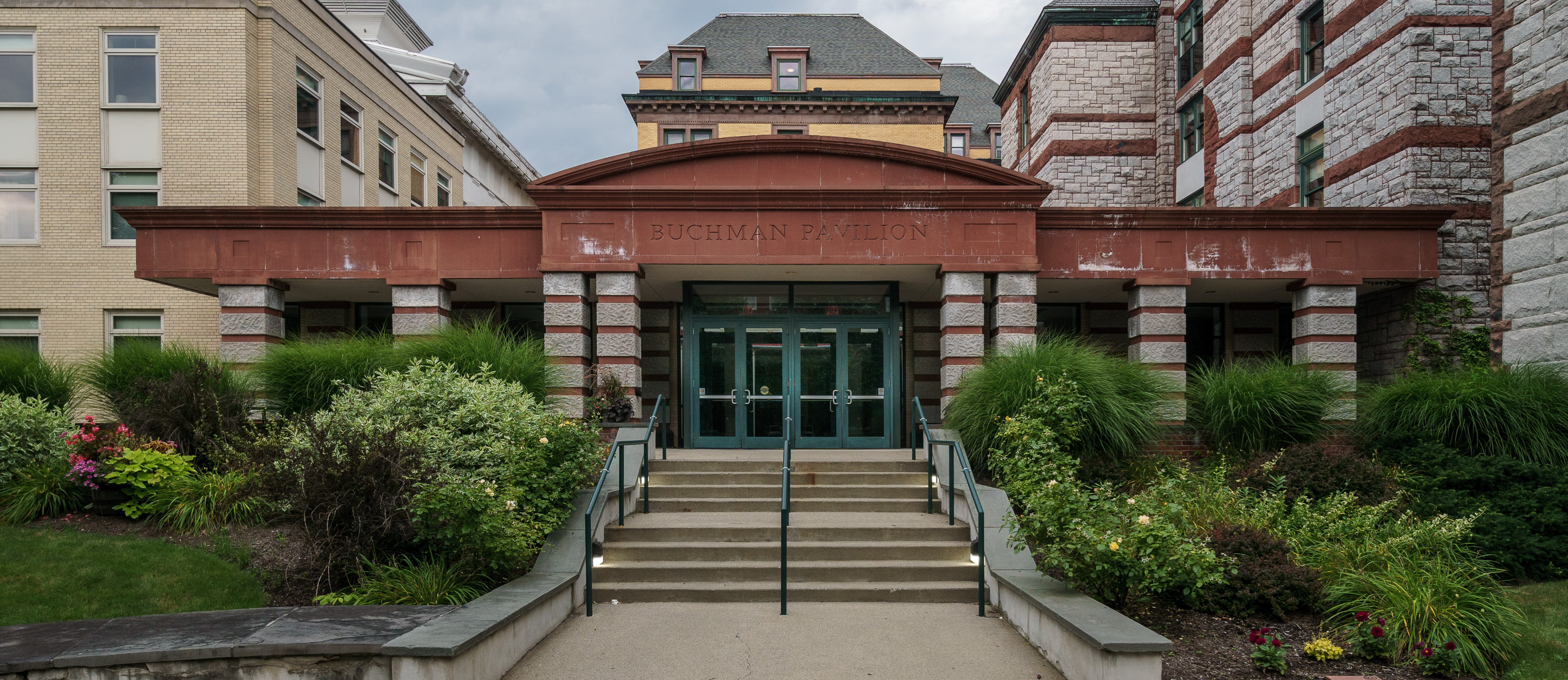
Buchman Pavilion

The self-contained 10-acre (4.0 ha) campus is located in the historic district of Troy, New York with 19th-century brownstone residences, Victorian gates, formal courtyards and walled gardens. This campus is on two blocks and is a safe campus with no recent reported crime in the area. Nearby are a bowling lane, numerous antique and jewelry stores, a public library, and several independent coffee shops. There is easy access to public transportation for students. The campus had been the home to the New York State Theatre Institute (NYSTI), which utilized the Schacht Fine Arts Center, but due to a lack of funding, NYSTI shut down at the end of 2010. The college filled the void with the Theatre Institute at Sage which has continued since then.

Residence halls and houses

Several of the brownstones are now used for student housing in place of traditional dormitories.

Two international houses, French House and Spanish House, are for students studying or speaking those languages. It requires an application process that you are either majoring in either one of those languages or are taking a course in either language to live in it. It is suggested you have a 3.0 gpa to be selected. German House was once counted among these but currently no longer requires that the students speak the language. This dorm is mostly filled with some juniors and seniors with one or two sophomores.

Wool House is for students in the honors program. In order to apply to live in Wool House, you must have a GPA of 3.0 or higher, community service credits, and participate in campus activities. Applications are accepted based on qualifications and then seniority since there are limited housing options within Wool House.

Other dorm houses include McMurray, Spicer and Gale. These three are combined as one dorm and are collectively referred to as MSG. The front main sitting room was restored in the early 1990s for the filming of The Age of Innocence. These dorms are named for the people who formerly owned them.

First-year students live in the Kellas and Slocum Halls. The lounges in these were restored with new furniture and plasma screen TVs in 2008. In the fall 2008 and the spring of 2009, the third floor of Kellas was opened to upperclassmen who wished to reside in the hall. In the fall of 2009, Kellas is expected to be first-years only and Slocum is expected to open its door for the first time in a few years.

McKinstry Hall is located above the McKinstry dining hall. These are also first-year dorms but like Slocum Hall, but due to financial reasons and small amount of enrollment they have not been lived in for quite a few years. They are used occasionally throughout the year for special activities and events. Slocum usually house transfer students just like Sage Hall does.

Upperclassman halls include Sage Hall, Manning Hall, and Rickets Hall. Sage Hall, featuring an elevator and back door that opens into Buchman, formerly housed the Troy Female Seminary, which is the only dormitory without a kitchen in the basement. Manning Hall is mostly graduates and seniors and single rooms. This (Manning) dorm features an elevator and air conditioning and also houses one of the Resident Director apartments. Rickets is only for graduate students but if there are more graduate students living on campus than expected then they are most likely housed in Manning Hall. Please note students can also live off campus.

== Student life ==
There are a variety of student organizations available, such as Phi Kappa Phi and other honor societies, the Quill student newspaper, The Sagettes a cappella group and the Review literary magazine, and an assortment of cultural, religious, academic, arts, and sports groups.

=== Traditions ===
Russell Sage College has a rich history of student traditions, the most notable of which is the rotation of class colors. Even class years are assigned either the title of Golden Horseshoes or Purple Cows, while odd class years are assigned either the title of Blue Angels or Red Devils. After a senior class graduates in May, the incoming first-year class is assigned that color in September.

Other traditions include:

- Big Sisters/Little Sisters: When a first-year student enters RSC, she is assigned a big sister in the junior class.
- Banner Night: Before the first-year class arrives on campus, their big sister class will create a banner in the color of their class with their class year on it. This banner is presented to the first-year class on Banner Night.
- Color Night: First-year class officers are announced on color night. The title of the night is changed every year based on the color of the first-year class (i.e. Gold Night, Blue Night, etc.)
- Class Sweaters: First-year students order sweaters in the fall, which are delivered to them at the beginning of Rally (see below). The sweaters are the color of their class and bear the crest of the college as well as their class year on the left breast.
- Class Dinners: Each class holds a formal dinner once per academic year.
- Ring Dinner: The junior class dinner, traditionally held in the fall semester, is when students receive their class rings.
- Rally: Raises money for community charities in a friendly competition. Rally is supervised by the senior class.
- Rally Day: The last day of Rally.
- Sweater Night: First-year students are allowed to wear their sweaters for the first time at the stroke of midnight.
- Room Trashing: Big Sisters attempt to find her little sister's class sweater. If they find their sister's sweater, they steal it—the big sister will hold on to it and wear it around her waist at Rally events.
- Class Day: At the annual spring moving-up ceremony held at the end of the school year before finals start, all classes "graduate" to their next year of college.

=== Athletics ===
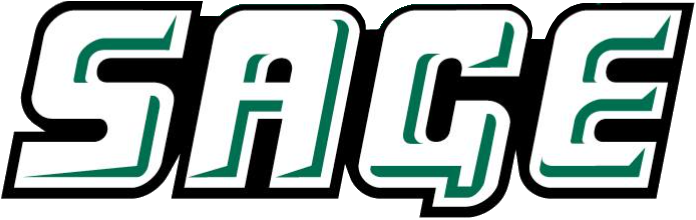
Sage athletics wordmark

In addition to club and intramural teams, Russell Sage is home to the Gators. Sage competes in the NCAA's Division III Empire 8 Conference. Russell Sage College currently offers 19 athletic teams and added 3 new teams in the 2021–2022 academic school year. Those new teams include baseball, women's golf, and eSports. Russell Sage will be adding Women's Flag Football in the Spring of 2026.

== Notable people ==
=== Alumnae ===
- Elizabeth Anne Allen, retired actress
- Ann Caracristi, cryptanalyst and former deputy director of the National Security Agency
- Prudence Bushnell, diplomat
- Ginny Brown-Waite, U.S. Representative
- Mary Donohue, judge and former lieutenant governor of New York
- Mireya Robles, writer and literary critic
- Frannie Lindsay, Poet

=== Alumni ===
- Francis Terry McNamara, diplomat
- Marcus Patterson, an American-Jamaican professional basketball player

=== Faculty and staff ===
- Eric Wollencott Barnes, diplomat and former chair of the English department
- Robert O. Fink, renowned papyrologist and classicist
- Gertrude Heidenthal, radiobiologist
- Eliza Kellas, renowned female educator and co-founder of Russell Sage
- Nancy Guttmann Slack, bryologist and professor emerita
- Dean P. Taylor, politician and Russell Sage trustee
