= Eldred Kraemer =

American football player (1929–1992)

No. 65
- Position: Guard

Personal information
- Born: October 2, 1929; St. Cloud, Minnesota
- Died: September 16, 1992 (aged 62); Pittsburgh, Pennsylvania
- Listed height: 6 ft 2 in (1.88 m)
- Listed weight: 225 lb (102 kg)

Career information
- High school: Clear Lake (MN)
- College: Pittsburgh
- NFL draft: 1955: 5th round, 58th overall pick

Career history
- San Francisco 49ers (1955)

Awards and highlights
- 2× Second-team All-American (1952, 1954); Third-team All-American (1953); 3× First-team All-Eastern (1952–1954)
- Stats at Pro Football Reference

Eldred Kraemer (October 2, 1929 – September 16, 1992) was an American professional football guard. He played for the San Francisco 49ers in 1955.
