= Ralph Chesnauskas =

American football player (1934–2018)

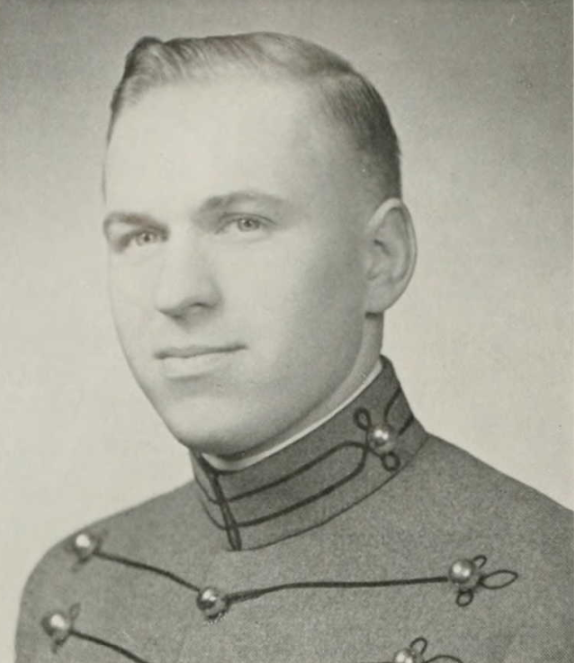
- Chesnauskas from 1956 Howitzer

Profile
- Position: Guard

Personal information
- Born: c. 1935
- Listed height: 6 ft 2 in (1.88 m)

Career information
- High school: Brockton (Massachusetts)
- College: Army

Awards and highlights
- First-team All-American (1954); First-team All-Eastern (1954)

Ralph Joseph Chesnauskas (January 21, 1934 – January 11, 2018) was an American football player.

== Early life ==
Chesnauskas grew up in Brockton, Massachusetts. He was an honor student at Brockton High School and on the school's football team as an end and on the baseball team as an outfielder.

== Military Academy ==
Chesnauskas entered the United States Military Academy in 1952. At the Academy, he was moved from end to guard. As a sophomore, he also converted 21 of 25 extra point kicks. He was also described by Army coach Earl Blaik as a "furious but heady defensive player." He was selected by the Associated Press as a first-team player on its 1954 All-America college football team. He also played baseball at Army and hit the longest home run ever at West Point.

== Later life ==
Chesnauskas was inducted into the Army Sports Hall of Fame in 2009.

Chesnauskas died in Hyannis, Massachusetts on January 11, 2018, at the age of 83.
