= Joe Johnson (running back) =

American football player (1929–2003)

No. 40, 24
- Positions: Halfback, end

Personal information
- Born: November 3, 1929; New Haven, Connecticut, U.S.
- Died: November 1, 2003 (aged 73); Las Vegas, Nevada, U.S.
- Listed height: 6 ft 0 in (1.83 m)
- Listed weight: 185 lb (84 kg)

Career information
- High school: Hillhouse (New Haven)
- College: Boston College (1950–1953)
- NFL draft: 1953: 11th round, 128th overall pick

Career history
- Green Bay Packers (1954–1958); Pittsburgh Steelers (1958)*; Boston Patriots (1960-1961)
- * Offseason or practice squad member only

Awards and highlights
- Boston College Hall of Fame

Career NFL/AFL statistics
- Rushing yards: 376
- Rushing average: 4
- Receptions: 84
- Receiving yards: 920
- Total touchdowns: 8
- Stats at Pro Football Reference

Joseph F. Johnson (November 3, 1929 – November 1, 2003) was an American professional football player who was a running back for seven seasons for the Green Bay Packers and Boston Patriots.
