= Mount Saint Michael Academy =

Mount St. Michael Academy

Location
- 4300 Murdock Avenue (Wakefield), Bronx, New York 10466; United States; 40°53′55″N 73°50′32″W

Information
- Type: Private; Independent; college-preparatory; Catholic school
- Motto: Ad Astra Per Aspera (To the Stars Through Difficulties)
- Religious affiliation: Catholic (Marist Brothers)
- Established: 1926 (100 years ago)
- Oversight: Archdiocese of New York
- President: Br. Michael Flanigan, FMS.
- Principal: Ms. Clare Brewster
- Grades: 6–12
- Gender: Boys
- Enrollment: 700+ (2020)
- Campus type: Urban
- Colors: Blue and gold
- Athletics conference: Catholic High School Athletic Association
- Nickname: Mountaineers
- Accreditation: Middle States Association of Colleges and Schools
- Newspaper: The Tower
- Tuition: $7,000 (Grades 6–8) (Note: 2024–2025, plus fees of $1,400) $10,500 (Grades 9–12) (Note: 2024–2025, plus fees of $1,400)
- Website: mtstmichael.org

Mount St. Michael Academy is an all-boys' private, Catholic, college preparatory school in the Wakefield neighborhood of the New York City borough of the Bronx. The school's campus also borders the city of Mount Vernon in neighboring Westchester County and is administered by the Archdiocese of New York.

The school opened on September 13, 1926, originally staffed by fourteen Marist Brothers, and dedicated to Saint Michael the Archangel.

The U.S. Department of Education named it a National Blue Ribbon School in 1992.

== Notable alumni ==
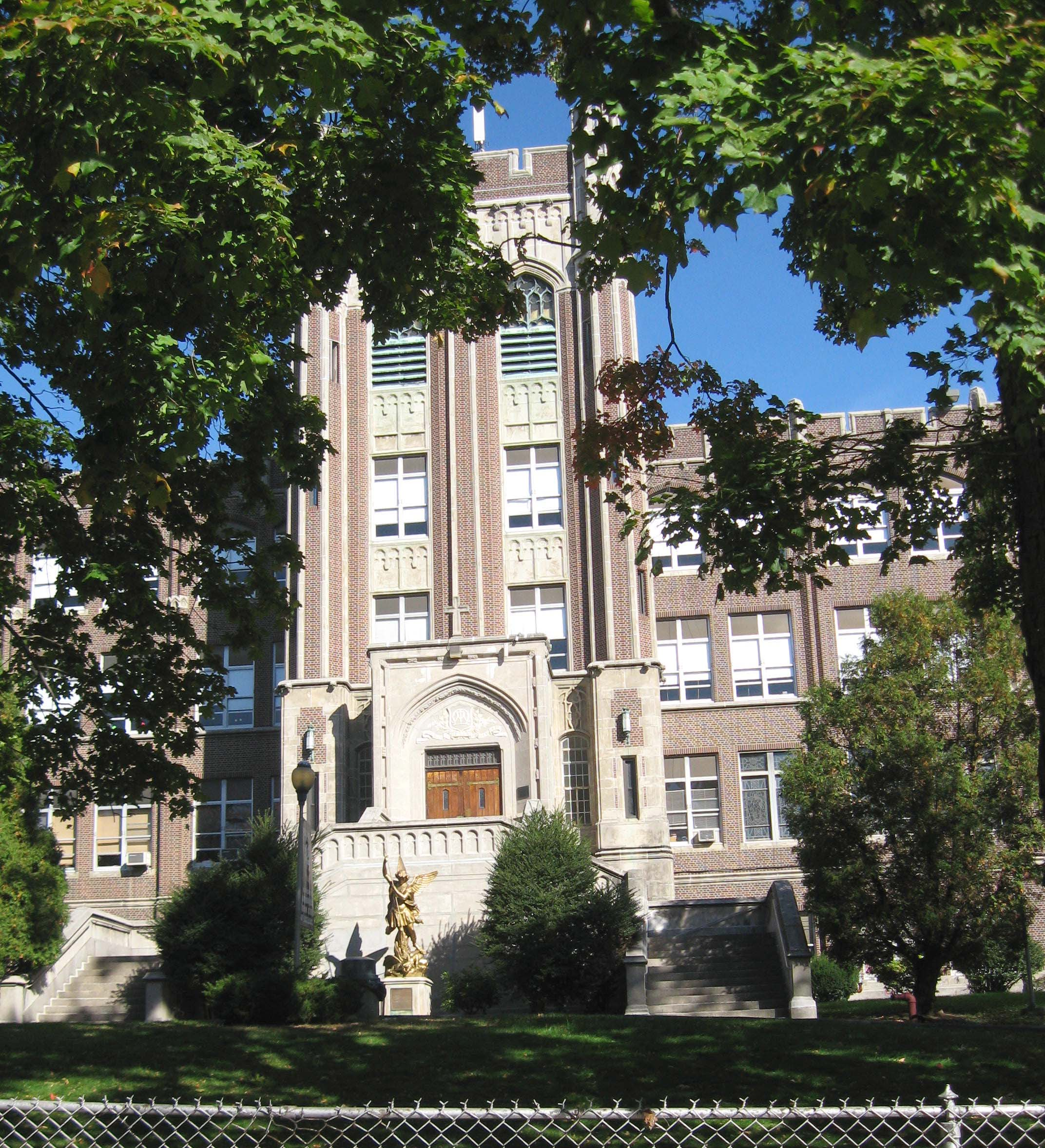
Central tower

=== Commerce and economics ===
- Rocco B. Commisso (1967) – founder, chairman and CEO of Mediacom
- Angelo Mozilo (1956) - Founder, Chairman, and CEO of Countrywide Financial Corporation
- George Ranalli – architect
- Don Valentine (1950) – venture capitalist, Sequoia Capital; "Grandfather of Silicon Valley venture capital"

=== Fine arts and entertainment ===
- Lillo Brancato – actor, known for A Bronx Tale, Renaissance Man
- Sean Combs (1987) – rapper; music producer
- Paul Grassi (1996) – reality television personality
- Walter Murphy – pianist; composer
- Ronnie Ortiz-Magro – reality television star, Jersey Shore
- Leon Robinson – actor; singer, known for Waiting to Exhale, Cool Runnings, Above the Rim
- Andre Royo – actor, known for the television series The Wire

=== Professional athletics ===
- Art Donovan (1943) – professional football player
- Richie Guerin (1950) – Naismith Hall of Famer; NBA basketball player; coach
- Bill O'Connor (1944) – professional football player
- Marcus Patterson (2013) – professional basketball player
- Bill Polian – ESPN analyst; former Indianapolis Colts general manager and president
- Vince Promuto (1956) – professional football player
- Caraun Reid (2009) – defensive tackle for the Washington Redskins
- James Rowson (1994) - baseball player and coach
- Alex Santos (2020) – MLB pitcher

=== Public service ===
- Philip Foglia – prosecutor; Italian American civic rights activist
- Joaquín "Jack" García – federal criminal investigator
- Anthony Principi (1962) – former U.S. Secretary of Veterans Affairs
- Kevin Riley - member of the New York City Council

== Sexual abuse cases ==
In 1988, an Irish-born Catholic priest and a Marist brother were indicted on charges they sexually abused boys at the school. Irish Reverend Bernárd Lynch, who served as the chaplain, and Brother Timothy Brady, the acting principal, were accused of molesting three boys. Lynch was acquitted while Brady was sentenced to prison. Following Brady's release from prison, Marist Brothers reassigned him to a Catholic high school in Chicago from 1993 to 2005.

In 2011, Marist Brother Lawrence Gordon, the assistant principal, was criminally charged for possessing child pornography. Gordon accidentally left a USB drive plugged into a library computer on Valentine's Day, which held sexually explicit images of underage boys. Gordon pleaded guilty and was sentenced to a year at St. Luke Institute, an institution known for treating priests accused of child sexual abuse.

In 2019, Father Bernárd Lynch was accused again of sexually abusing a different teen student at the school 40 years ago, according to the lawsuit. The 57-year-old plaintiff, then a 16-year-old at the school, alleged the sexual abuse occurred in 1978 and 1979. The lawsuit was dropped in 2021.
