= Frank Morze =

American football player (1933–2006)

- Morze in 1961

No. 53, 58, 63
- Positions: Center, tackle

Personal information
- Born: March 21, 1933; Gardner, Massachusetts, U.S.
- Died: May 28, 2006 (aged 73); Incline Village, Nevada, U.S.
- Listed height: 6 ft 4 in (1.93 m)
- Listed weight: 270 lb (122 kg)

Career information
- High school: Gardner
- College: Boston College (1951-1954)
- NFL draft: 1955: 2nd round, 21st overall pick

Career history
- San Francisco 49ers (1957–1961); Cleveland Browns (1962–1963); San Francisco 49ers (1964)

Awards and highlights
- First-team All-Eastern (1954)

Career NFL statistics
- Games played: 84
- Starts: 53
- Fumble recoveries: 2
- Stats at Pro Football Reference

Frank Joseph Morze Jr. (Pronounced: MORE-zee) (March 21, 1933 – May 28, 2006) was an American professional football offensive lineman in the National Football League (NFL). He played in the league for seven seasons for the San Francisco 49ers and Cleveland Browns.

== Early life ==
Frank Morze was a native of Gardner, Massachusetts and graduated from Gardner High School in 1951, where he played basketball, football, and track and field. He went on to attend Boston College, where he played college football under Mike Holovak from 1951 to 1954. Morze started in all four years, and was given All-East and Catholic All-America honors, as well as being named the team's most valuable player in his final year. He graduated from the school in 1955.

== Professional career ==
Morze was selected in the second round of the 1955 NFL draft by the San Francisco 49ers as the 21st overall pick. However, due to the military draft he did not join the team until the 1957 season. While in the military, Morze spent two years as a lieutenant in the United States Marine Corps, stationed at Camp Lejeune.

As a 24-year old rookie in 1957, Morze started every game for the 49ers and helped lead the team to their first NFL playoff appearance in franchise history. It would be Morze's only playoff appearance in his career.

He played regularly for the team at the center position, until signing with the Cleveland Browns for the 1962 season as a free agent. Morze only saw action in two games in 1962 but appeared all 14 games for the Browns the following year.

He would rejoin the 49ers for the 1964 season under Hickey again, but then retired.

== Life after football ==
In 1981, Morze moved to Nevada with his wife, Nancy, and three children: David, Michael, and Suzanne. Morze started his own metal fabrication business in Las Vegas called Silver State Steel. In 1996, Morze was inducted into the Boston College Varsity Club Athletic Hall of Fame. Morze died in Nevada in 2006 after battling with heart disease.

== See also ==
- List of Boston College Eagles in the NFL draft
