= 1954 Army Cadets football team =

American college football season

1954 Army Cadets football
- Conference: Independent

Ranking
- Coaches: No. 7
- AP: No. 7
- Record: 7–2
- Head coach: Earl Blaik (14th season)
- Captain: Bob Farris
- Home stadium: Michie Stadium

1954 Eastern college football independents records
	Conf.			Overall
Team	W	L	T	W		L		T
Hobart		–		8	–	0	–	0
Juniata		–		8	–	0	–	0
Pennsylvania Military		–		7	–	0	–	0
Trinity (CT)		–		7	–	0	–	0
Worcester Tech		–		6	–	0	–	0
Carnegie Tech		–		7	–	0	–	1
Boston College		–		8	–	1	–	0
Boston University		–		7	–	2	–	0
Hofstra		–		7	–	2	–	0
No. 20 Penn State		–		7	–	2	–	0
Tufts		–		6	–	2	–	0
Brown		–		6	–	2	–	1
Drexel		–		5	–	2	–	0
Bucknell		–		6	–	3	–	0
Colgate		–		5	–	2	–	2
Princeton		–		5	–	3	–	1
Yale		–		5	–	3	–	1
Cornell		–		5	–	4	–	0
Harvard		–		4	–	3	–	1
Syracuse		–		4	–	4	–	0
Pittsburgh		–		4	–	5	–	0
Franklin & Marshall		–		3	–	5	–	0
Temple		–		3	–	5	–	0
Dartmouth		–		3	–	6	–	0
Holy Cross		–		3	–	7	–	0
Buffalo		–		2	–	7	–	0
Fordham		–		1	–	7	–	1
Columbia		–		1	–	8	–	0
Villanova		–		1	–	9	–	0
Penn		–		0	–	9	–	0
Rankings from AP Poll

The 1954 Army Cadets football team represented the United States Military Academy as an independent during the 1954 college football season. In their 14th year under head coach Earl Blaik, the Cadets compiled a 7–2 record and outscored all opponents by a combined total of 325 to 127. In the annual Army–Navy Game, the Cadets lost to the Midshipmen by a 27 to 20 score. The Cadets also lost to South Carolina by a 34 to 20 score.

Four Army players were honored on the 1954 College Football All-America Team: halfback Tommy Bell (FWAA, INS-1, NEA-2); end Don Holleder (AFCA, INS-2, NEA-1, UP-1, CP-1); guard Ralph Chesnauskas (AP-1, UP-3); and quarterback Pete Vann (INS-2, UP-3, CP-2).

== Schedule ==
Date	Opponent	Rank	Site	Result	Attendance	Source
September 25	South Carolina	No. 18	Michie Stadium; West Point, NY	L 20–34	12,000	
October 2	at Michigan		Michigan Stadium; Ann Arbor, MI	W 26–7	69,161–69,783	
October 9	Dartmouth		Michie Stadium; West Point, NY	W 60–6	23,250–33,250	
October 16	at No. 6 Duke	No. 18	Duke Stadium; Durham, NC	W 28–14	42,500	
October 23	at Columbia	No. 9	Baker Field; New York, NY	W 67–12	30,000	
October 30	Virginia	No. 5	Michie Stadium; West Point, NY	W 21–20	20,500	
November 6	at Yale	No. 7	Yale Bowl; New Haven, CT	W 48–7	73,600	
November 13	at Penn	No. 6	Franklin Field; Philadelphia, PA	W 35–0	34,477	
November 27	vs. No. 6 Navy	No. 5	Philadelphia Municipal Stadium; Philadelphia, PA (Army–Navy Game)	L 20–27	104,000	
Rankings from AP Poll released prior to the game

== Roster ==
1954 Army Cadets football team roster
Players
Coaches
Offense

Pos.	#	Name	Class
HB		Tommy Bell	Sr
G		Ralph Chesnauskas	Jr
E		Don Holleder	Jr
FB		Pat Uebel	Jr
QB		Pete Vann	Sr

Defense

Pos.	#	Name	Class

Special teams

Pos.	#	Name	Class

Head coach

- Earl Blaik

Coordinators/assistant coaches

Legend

- (C) Team captain
- (S) Suspended
- (I) Ineligible
- Injured
- Redshirt
