= 1954 Pittsburgh Panthers football team =

American college football season

1954 Pittsburgh Panthers football
- Conference: Independent
- Record: 4–5
- Head coach: Red Dawson (3rd season; first 3 games); Tom Hamilton (interim, final 6 games)
- Home stadium: Pitt Stadium

1954 Eastern college football independents records
	Conf.			Overall
Team	W	L	T	W		L		T
Hobart		–		8	–	0	–	0
Juniata		–		8	–	0	–	0
Pennsylvania Military		–		7	–	0	–	0
Trinity (CT)		–		7	–	0	–	0
Worcester Tech		–		6	–	0	–	0
Carnegie Tech		–		7	–	0	–	1
Boston College		–		8	–	1	–	0
Boston University		–		7	–	2	–	0
Hofstra		–		7	–	2	–	0
No. 20 Penn State		–		7	–	2	–	0
Tufts		–		6	–	2	–	0
Brown		–		6	–	2	–	1
Drexel		–		5	–	2	–	0
Bucknell		–		6	–	3	–	0
Colgate		–		5	–	2	–	2
Princeton		–		5	–	3	–	1
Yale		–		5	–	3	–	1
Cornell		–		5	–	4	–	0
Harvard		–		4	–	3	–	1
Syracuse		–		4	–	4	–	0
Pittsburgh		–		4	–	5	–	0
Franklin & Marshall		–		3	–	5	–	0
Temple		–		3	–	5	–	0
Dartmouth		–		3	–	6	–	0
Holy Cross		–		3	–	7	–	0
Buffalo		–		2	–	7	–	0
Fordham		–		1	–	7	–	1
Columbia		–		1	–	8	–	0
Villanova		–		1	–	9	–	0
Penn		–		0	–	9	–	0
Rankings from AP Poll

The 1954 Pittsburgh Panthers football team represented the University of Pittsburgh as an independent during the 1954 college football season. The Panthers lost their first three games of the season under third year head coach Red Dawson, before he stepped down due to poor health. Pittsburgh's athletic director, Tom Hamilton, appointed himself interim head coach and led the team to a 4–2 record over their final six games of the season. Pittsburgh finished the year with a record of 4–5.

== Schedule ==
Date	Opponent	Rank	Site	Result	Attendance	Source
September 24	at No. 15 USC		Los Angeles Memorial Coliseum; Los Angeles, CA	L 7–27	50,238	
October 2	Minnesota		Pitt Stadium; Pittsburgh, PA	L 7–46	31,433	
October 9	No. 8 Notre Dame		Pitt Stadium; Pittsburgh, PA (rivalry)	L 0–33	57,487	
October 16	No. 9 Navy		Pitt Stadium; Pittsburgh, PA	W 21–19	26,537	
October 23	Northwestern		Pitt Stadium; Pittsburgh, PA	W 14–7	25,307	
October 30	at No. 7 West Virginia		Mountaineer Field; Morgantown, WV (rivalry)	W 13–10	34,000	
November 6	at No. 2 Ohio State	No. 20	Ohio Stadium; Columbus, OH	L 0–26	77,429	
November 13	at Nebraska		Memorial Stadium; Lincoln, NE	W 21–7	26,622	
November 20	Penn State		Pitt Stadium; Pittsburgh, PA (rivalry)	L 0–13	41,451	
Rankings from AP Poll released prior to the game

== Preseason ==
After rumored to be headed to the University of Minnesota, Coach Dawson returned for his third season as Pitt coach. The Panthers Athletic Department added line coach Bill Bevan to Dawson's staff, which allowed Bob Timmons to coach basketball after November 1.

On March 29, Coach Dawson welcomed more than 60 student-athletes to his third spring practice. The initial roster included 18 lettermen, 22 sophomores from the previous year's freshmen team, 2 transfers and an Army returnee. Quarterback Bill Amos and tackle Jim Dalrymple transferred from Maryland, and end Walt Belich, who played for Pitt in 1950, returned from his military service. Drills were held Mondays, Wednesdays, Thursdays and Saturdays. No drills were held on Tuesdays and Fridays due to late labs for the medical, dental and engineering students. The NCAA allowed for 20 days of drills. The session ended on May 8 with a football clinic for high school coaches and an intra-squad game.

Dr. Ralph Shanor, team physician for 25 years, was with the team through spring drills, but became ill in late summer, entered the hospital on September 30 and died on November 6.

Fall practice was held on campus at the Ellsworth Center Field. 53 candidates began two-a-day drills on September 1 to prepare for the season opener on September 24 in Los Angeles, CA. Coach Dawson was upbeat: “We had our first decent freshman team last fall...20 of our 24 freshmen are back. That's a pretty good record.” But even with the added depth, the Panthers had the usual brutal schedule to contend with.

== Game summaries ==
=== at USC ===
Week 1: Pitt at USC

Team	1	2	3	4	Total
Pitt	0	7	0	0	7
• USC	0	7	0	20	27

- Date: September 24, 1954
- Location: Los Angeles Memorial Coliseum
  Los Angeles, CA
- Game start: 8:30 p.m.
- Game attendance: 50,238
- Game weather: clear and warm
- Referee: Ed Wagner

Scoring summary
2	USC	Jon Arnett 2-yard run (Sam Tsagalakis kick)	USC 7–0
2	PITT	Dick Scherer 49-yard pass from Henry Ford ( Gene Steratore kick)	TIED 7– 7
4	USC	Jon Arnett 25-yard run ( kick missed)	USC 13–7
4	USC	Jon Arnett 1-yard run (Ed Fouch kick)	USC 20–7
4	USC	Lindon Crow 66-yard pass from Ellsworth Kissinger (Tsagalakis passed to Joe Tisdale )	USC 27–7

On September 24, in a rare Friday night game, the Panthers opened their season against the USC Trojans in the Los Angeles Memorial Coliseum. Pitt and USC were tied 2–2 all-time. USC beat the Panthers in the 1930 and 1933 Rose Bowl games, but then Pitt won the 1934 and 1935 regular season meetings. Fourth-year Coach Jess Hill's Trojans were 1–0, having beaten Washington State 39–0.

Coach Dawson's 46-member squad left on Wednesday morning. After a 9-hour Pan American flight, they arrived in LA, and had a “workout under the lights at the Coliseum.” Radio Station KDKA broadcast the game back to Pittsburgh.

Pitt tied the Trojans 7–7 through three quarters, but gave up 3 touchdowns in the fourth and lost their opening game 27–7. USC substitute running back Jon Arnett scored three touchdowns on runs of 1, 2 and 25 yards, and Lindon Crow caught a 66-yard touchdown pass from Ellsworth Kissinger late in the game. The Trojans converted 3 of 4 extra points. The Panthers answered the first USC touchdown with a 49-yard touchdown pass from Henry Ford to end Dick Scherer. Gene Steratore booted the extra point. At the start of the final period, Pitt fullback Tom Jenkins injured his ankle and had to be helped off the field. At the time Jenkins was the Panthers leading rusher and a stalwart on defense. Pitt end Joe Paluck and Trojan tackle Frank Pavich were ejected for fighting.

Henry Ford rushed 16 times for 69 yards and Tom Jenkins had 12 carries for 54 yards before his injury. USC's Jon Arnett led all rushers with 118 yards on 15 carries.

The Pitt starting lineup for the game against USC was Joe Walton (left end), Lou Palatella (left tackle), Ed Stowe (left guard), John Cenc (center), Al Bolkovac (right guard), Eldred Kraemer (right tackle), Joe Paluck (right end), Rudy Mattioli (quarterback), Henry Ford (left halfback), Ambrose Bagamery (right halfback) and Tom Jenkins (fullback). Substitutes appearing in the game for Pittsburgh were Bob McQuaide, Fred Glatz, Bill Cessar, Bob Pollack, Harold Hunter, Bob Ballock, Ed Bose, Joe Los, Bill Schmitt, Herman Canil, Howard Linn, Dick Scherer, Darrell Lewis, Jim Lenhart, Corny Salvaterra, Charles Cost, Nick Passodelis, Gene Steratore, Richie McCabe and Robert Grier.

=== Minnesota ===
Week 2: Minnesota at Pitt

Team	1	2	3	4	Total
• Minnesota	13	0	19	14	46
Pitt	0	7	0	0	7

- Date: October 2, 1954
- Location: Pitt Stadium
  Pittsburgh, PA
- Game start: 1:30 p.m.
- Game attendance: 31,433
- Game weather: hot and humid
- Referee: Albert J. Booth Jr. (Yale)

Scoring summary
1	MINN	Dick McNamara 24-yard pass from Gino Cappelletti (kick missed)	MINN 6–0
1	MINN	Frank Bachman 3-yard run (Cappelletti kick)	MINN 13– 0
2	PITT	Henry Ford 4-yard run ( Ambrose Bagamery kick)	MINN 13–7
3	MINN	Bob McNamara 65-yard punt return (kick missed)	MINN 19–7
3	MINN	Cappelletti 14-yard run ( kick missed)	MINN 25–7
3	MINN	Dick McNamara 6-yard run (Don Swanson kick)	MINN 32–7
4	MINN	Darrell Cochran 16-yard run ( Swanson kick)	MINN 39–7
4	MINN	Tom Juhl 16-yard pass from Don Swanson (Swanson kick )	MINN 46–7

On October 2, the Panthers played their home opener against the Minnesota Gophers. Minnesota led the all-time series 7–0 and had out-scored the Panthers 197–38. First-year Coach Murray Warmath's squad was 1–0, having beaten Nebraska (19–7). Quarterback/kicker Gino Cappelletti, halfback Bob McNamara and end Gordy Soltau were future pros in the Minnesota lineup.

Coach Dawson's team depth was diminished as starting fullback Tom Jenkins, substitute quarterback Darrell Jenkins, end Dick Scherer and halfback Corny Salvaterra were all injured in the USC game. Jenkins was replaced by sophomore Nick Passodelis in the starting lineup.

Minnesota ran their record against the Panthers to 8–0 with a resounding 46–7 win. Minnesota led 13–0 at the end of the opening quarter on a 24-yard touchdown pass from Gino Cappelletti to Bob McNamara and a 3-yard run by Frank Backman. Cappelletti converted 1 of two extra points. The Panthers only score came in the second quarter. It was all Henry Ford. He returned a punt to the Minnesota 41-yard line, ran 37 yards around end to the 4-yard line and then ran into the end zone for the score. Ambrose Bagamery converted the extra point. The second half was all Minnesota, as they scored 5 touchdowns. Early in the third period, Bob McNamara returned a punt 65-yards for a touchdown. Pitt fumbles led to two more third quarter scores, and the Gophers subs managed to score twice in the final stanza. The favored Panthers lost three fumbles and had three passes intercepted. They earned 7 first downs on 108 total yards gained.

The Pitt starting lineup for the game against Minnesota was Joe Walton (left end), Lou Palatella (left tackle), Ed Stowe (left guard), John Cenci (center), Al Bolkovac (right guard), Eldred Kraemer (right tackle), Joe Paluck (right end), Rudy Mattioli (quarterback), Henry Ford (left halfback), Ambrose Bagamery (right halfback) and Nick Passodelis (fullback). Substitutes appearing in the game for Pitt were Bob McQuaide, Bill Cessar, Bob Pollack, Harold Hunter, Bob Ballock, Ed Bose, Joe Los, Bill Schmitt, Howard Linn, Jim Lenhart, Charles Cost, Gene Steratore, Richie McCabe, Robert Grier, Glen Dillon, Dale Brown, Bill Amos, Lou Cimarolli and Pete Neft.

=== Notre Dame ===
Week 3: Notre Dame at Pitt

Team	1	2	3	4	Total
• Notre Dame	0	13	7	13	33
Pitt	0	0	0	0	0

- Date: October 9, 1954
- Location: Pitt Stadium
  Pittsburgh, PA
- Game start: 1:30 p.m.
- Game attendance: 57,487
- Game weather: cloudy and warm
- Referee: D. H. Buchanan (Temple)

Scoring summary
2	ND	Sherrill Sipes 24-yard pass from Tom Carey (kick missed)	ND 6–0
2	ND	Ralph Guglielmi 1-yard run (Don Schaefer kick)	ND 13– 0
3	ND	Dean Studer 4-yard run ( Schaefer kick)	ND 20–0
4	ND	Paul Hornung 11-yard run (kick missed)	ND 26–0
4	ND	Jim Munro 13-yard pass from Carey (Jimmy Morse kick )	ND 33–0

On October 9, the Panthers played the Notre Dame Fighting Irish. Notre Dame led the all-time series 14–6–1. First-year Coach Terry Brennan's squad was 1–1 and ranked #8 in the AP Poll. They opened with a victory over Texas (21–0) and then lost to Purdue (14–27). The Irish were led by three All-Americans: quarterback Ralph Guglielmi, tackle Frank Varrichione and end Dan Shannon.

Coach Dawson was being criticized in the media for both the Panthers poor start to the season, and his proclivity to not speak to the press. Athletic Director Tom Hamilton told the scribes at the Tuesday news luncheon: “Two poor performances don't mean a football team is through. We'll bounce back and it will be no later than Saturday afternoon against Notre Dame.......I'm no Pollyanna. We're going to play good football. The kids haven't found themselves but they will. I've got 100 per cent confidence in them and the coaching staff.” The Athletic Committee met, and they too, gave Dawson a vote of approval.

In front 57,487 fans the Panthers lost their third straight game 33–0. Pitt gained 69 yards rushing and 18 yards passing, completing only 2 of 16 passes. They earned 6 first downs. The Pitt defense kept Notre Dame scoreless through the first quarter. Then the Irish scored two touchdowns in the second period, one in the third and two more in the final quarter. Five players scored touchdowns: Sherrill Sipes, Ralph Guglielmi, Dean Studer, Paul Hornung and Jim Munro. Don Schaefer booted two extra points and Jim Morse added one.

Coach Dawson addressed the press after the game: “We just give ball games away. We must be the most charitable football team I ever saw. Throw out the mistakes and this Pitt club could be a good football team. Notre Dame just played it better than we did....”

The Pitt starting lineup for the game against Notre Dame was Bob McQuaide (left end), Lou Palatella (left tackle), Ed Stowe (left guard), John Cenci (center), Bill Schmitt (right guard), Eldred Kraemer (right tackle), Joe Paluck (right end), Corny Salvaterra (quarterback), Henry Ford (left halfback), Ambrose Bagamery (right halfback) and Nick Passodelis (fullback). Substitutes appearing in the game for Pitt were Tom Jenkins, Bob Pollack, Joe Walton, Harold Hunter, Bob Ballock, Ed Bose, Joe Los, Al Bolkovac, Howard Linn, Dick Scherer, Jim Lenhart, Charles Cost, Richie McCabe, Pete Neft, Vince Scorsone and Don Michaels.

=== Navy ===
Week 4: Navy at Pitt

Team	1	2	3	4	Total
Navy	6	6	0	7	19
• Pitt	0	14	0	7	21

- Date: October 16, 1954
- Location: Pitt Stadium
  Pittsburgh, PA
- Game start: 1:30 p.m.
- Game attendance: 26,537
- Game weather: clear
- Referee: John H. Coles (Westminster)

Scoring summary
1	NAVY	Joe Gattuso 1-yard run (kick missed)	NAVY 6–0
2	PITT	Corny Salvaterra 1-yard run (Ambrose Bagamery kick)	PITT 7– 6
2	PITT	Henry Ford 22-yard pass from Salvaterra ( Bagamery kick)	PITT 14–6
2	NAVY	Jack Garrow 24-yard pass from Dick Echard (kick missed)	PITT 14–12
4	PITT	Salvaterra 8-yard run (Bagamery kick)	PITT 21–12
4	NAVY	Bill Hepworth 5-yard run (George Textor kick )	PITT 21–19

On October 16, the Panthers hosted the Midshipmen of the Naval Academy. Pitt led the all-time series 5–1–1. The last time these teams met was in 1934. Pitt Athletic Director, Tom Hamilton was then the head coach of Navy, and his previously undefeated Middies lost 31–7.

Fifth-year Coach Eddie Erdelatz's squad was 3–0 and ranked #9 in the AP football poll. End Ron Beagle was a consensus All-American.

On Monday, October 11, Tom Hamilton told the Sun-Telegraph: “Dawson will be our coach for the Navy game Saturday, for the week after and the week after that. I don't know where these rumors start, anyhow.” On Tuesday, Coach Dawson went to the hospital for “an irregularity of the heart.” Tom Hamilton stepped in as interim coach until Dawson would be able to return.

The 13-point underdog Panthers broke into the win column with an exciting 21–19 upset of the Navy. The Midshipmen opened the game with an onside kick, that they recovered on the Panthers 45-yard line. On the eighth play from scrimmage, Joe Gattuso ran through tackle from the 1 for the score. George Textor missed the extra point and Navy led 6–0. Then Navy intercepted a Pitt pass and drove to the Panthers 3-yard line. The Panthers defense stiffened and took possession on the 6-yard line. The Panthers offense proceeded to drive 94 yards in 16 plays for their first score. Corny Salvaterra scored on a quarterback sneak and Bugs Bagamery booted the extra point to put the Panthers ahead 7–6. Pitt got the ball back on a fumble by Navy quarterback Dick Echard that was recovered by end Fred Glatz. A 22-yard pass from Salvaterra to Henry Ford and another placement by Bagamery put the Panthers ahead 14–6. Late in the half, Navy intercepted a Pitt pass on the Panthers 24-yard line. A 24-yard scoring toss from Echard to Jack Garrow and another missed placement made the score 14–12 at halftime. After a scoreless third period, Fred Glatz recovered a fumble on the Navy 12-yard line. On third down from the 8-yard line, Salvaterra faked a hand-off to Henry Ford and ran around right end for the touchdown. Bagamery added the point after for a 21–12 Pitt lead. Navy answered with an 80-yard scoring drive. Bill Hepworth scored the touchdown and Textor added the point after.

Coach Hamilton was pleased and told Roy McHugh of The Pittsburgh Press: “We enjoyed the game and I hope Red enjoyed it too. I guess a lot of people thought our kids would fold but they aren't that kind.”

The Pitt starting lineup for the game against Navy was Bob McQuaide (left end), Lou Palatella (left tackle), Ed Stowe (left guard), John Cenci (center), Al Bolkovac (right guard), Eldred Kraemer (right tackle), Joe Paluck (right end), Corny Salvaterra (quarterback), Henry Ford (left halfback), Ambrose Bagamery (right halfback) and Nick Passodelis (fullback). Substitutes appearing in the game for Pitt were Tom Jenkins, Fred Glatz, Bob Pollack, Harold Hunter, Bob Ballock, Ed Bose, Joe Los, Bill Schmitt, Herman Canil, Howard Linn, Dick Scherer, Darrell Lewis, Jim Lenhart, Charles Cost, Richie McCabe, Bobby Grier, Dale Brown, Pete Neft, Bob Rosborough and John Jacobs.

=== Northwestern ===
Week 5: Nebraska at Pitt

Team	1	2	3	4	Total
Northwestern	0	7	0	0	7
• Pitt	7	0	0	7	14

- Date: October 23, 1954
- Location: Pitt Stadium
  Pittsburgh, PA
- Game start: 1:30 p.m.
- Game attendance: 25,307
- Game weather: warm
- Referee: L. S. Kelly (Dartmouth)

Scoring summary
1	PITT	Henry Ford 1-yard run (Ambrose Bagamery kick)	PITT 7–0
2	NW	John Foster 1-yard run (John Damore kick)	TIE 7– 7
4	PITT	Corny Salvaterra 1-yard run (Bagamery kick )	PITT 14–7

On October 23, the Northwestern Wildcats visited Pittsburgh for the first time. The all-time series was 2–1 in Northwestern's favor. Coach Bob Voigts' squad was 1–3 for the season.

On Friday, Coach Dawson was told by Dr. Richard Horn not to coach for the remainder of the season. The Pitt Athletic Committee met and authorized Tom Hamilton to continue as interim coach through the end of the season.

This was the Homecoming Game, High School Day, Band Day and was the NCAA Game of the Week on national TV.

Coach Hamilton ran his record to 2–0, as the Panthers scored in the final minute to beat the Wildcats 14–7. The Panthers opened the game with a 66-yard drive, capped by a 1-yard touchdown run by Henry Ford. Ambrose Bagamery added the extra point and Pitt led 7–0. The Wildcats answered in the second period. Northwestern recovered a Pitt fumble and proceeded to drive 74 yards to the Panthers 2-yard line. The Panthers defense stiffened and took possession on downs. On first down Pitt fumbled again and Northwestern recovered. Wildcats halfback John Foster scored on first down and John Damore's placement tied the score. The Panthers spent the third quarter in Northwestern territory, but could not score. Fumbles and an interception stymied their drives. Late in the final quarter, quarterback Corny Salvaterra returned a punt to the Wildcats 37-yard line. Two running plays moved the ball to the 16-yard line with less than 3 minutes to play. Five more running plays put the ball inside the 1-yard line. With less than a minute to play, Salvaterra ran around right end for the touchdown. Bagamery made it 14–7. In the final 39 seconds, the Wildcats were able to drive to the Pitt 17-yard line where they fumbled, and Pitt end Fred Glatz recovered.

Pitt earned 20 first downs and gained 303 total yards, but had 4 fumbles, 1 interception and 91 yards in penalties. The Panthers defense held Northwestern to 10 first downs and 154 total yards.

The Pitt starting lineup for the game against Northwestern was Bob McQuaide (left end), Lou Palatella (left tackle), Ed Stowe (left guard), John Cenci (center), Al Bolkovac (right guard), Eldred Kraemer (right tackle), Joe Paluck (right end), Corny Salvaterra (quarterback), Henry Ford (left halfback), Nick Passodelis (right halfback) and Bobby Grier (fullback). Substitutes appearing in the game for Pitt were Tom Jenkins, Joe Walton, Fred Glatz, Harold Hunter, Ed Bose, Joe Los, Bill Schmitt, Herman Canil, Howard Linn, Darrell Lewis, Jim Lenhart, Charles Cost, Ambrose Bagamery, Richie McCabe, Bob Rosborough, John Jacobs and Chester Rice.

=== at West Virginia ===
Week 6: Pitt at West Virginia

Team	1	2	3	4	Total
• Pitt	0	0	7	6	13
West Virginia	0	3	0	7	10

- Date: October 30, 1954
- Location: Mountaineer Field
  Morgantown, WV
- Game start: 1:30 p.m.
- Game attendance: 34,000
- Game weather: clear and windy

Scoring summary
2	WVU	Chick Donaldson 16-yard field goal	WVU 3–0
3	PITT	Ambrose Bagamery 9-yard pass from Corny Salvaterra (Bagamery kick)	PITT 7–3
4	WVU	Joe Marconi 4-yard run (Donaldson kick)	WVU 10–7
4	PITT	Fred Glatz 4-yard pass from Salvaterra (Bagamery missed kick)	PITT 13–10

On October 30, after a 4-game homestand, the Panthers traveled to Morgantown, WV for the annual Backyard Brawl. Pitt led the all-time series 34–11–1, but West Virginia had won the past two games. Pitt had never lost in Morgantown. The Mountaineers were undefeated (4–0) and ranked #6 in the AP football poll. Future pros Sam Huff, Bruce Bosley and Joe Marconi were on the roster.

Coach Hamilton suspended three players for skipping practice. Starting tackle Ed Stowe, reserve tackle Joe Los and halfback Gene Steratore decided to drive to Florida and seek work for the winter. Steratore came back to school, but the other two remained in Florida. Harold Hunter replaced Stowe in the starting lineup. Coach Hamilton told The Pitt News: “The worst experience I've ever had in athletics. Running out on the team in the middle of the campaign with a big game coming up isn't fair to the coaches and it isn't fair to the team. The sooner we get rid of guys like that the better.”

The Panthers evened their record at 3–3 with a 13–10 upset over the favored Mountaineers. West Virginia center Chuck Donaldson kicked a 16-yard field goal on the last play of the first half. Pitt was inside the Mountaineers 35-yard line five times in the first half but could not score. Three times they turned the ball over on fumbles. In the third quarter Pitt end John Paluk recovered a West Virginia fumble on the Mountaineers 30-yard line. Quarterback Corny Salvaterra capped the short drive with a 9-yard touchdown pass to Ambrose Bagamery. Bagamery added the placement for a 7–3 lead. In the final period West Virginia blocked a Pitt punt and recovered on the Panthers 46-yard line. Fullback Joe Marconi finished the drive with a 4-yard end run. Donaldson converted the extra point for a 10–7 West Virginia lead. Pitt was not to be denied as Henry Ford returned the ensuing kick-off to the Panthers 45-yard line. Five plays moved the ball to the West Virginia 2-yard line. Three plays later they were on the 4-yard line. Salvaterra then passed to end Fred Glatz, who made a leaping catch in the end zone. Bagamery missed the placement,, but Pitt led 13–10. West Virginia came back and was on the Pitt 32-yard line for one last - gasp play. They threw a pass and Pitt was called for roughing, which moved the ball to the 17-yard line. The final pass was knocked down by two Panthers in the end zone. Pitt was 3–3 for the season.

Pitt quarterback Corny Salvaterra carried the ball 16 times for 96 yards, completed 8 of 16 passes for 105 yards and had 1pass intercepted. West Virginia backs Dick Nicholson carried 6 times for 91 yards and Joe Marconi carried 11 times for 62 yards.

The Pitt starting lineup for the game against West Virginia was Bob McQuaide (left end), Lou Palatella (left tackle), Harold Hunter (left guard), John Cenci (center), Al Bolkovac (right guard), Eldred Kraemer (right tackle), Joe Paluck (right end), Corny Salvaterra (quarterback), Henry Ford (left halfback), Nick Passodelis (right halfback) and Tom Jenkins (fullback). Substitutes appearing in the game for Pitt were Joe Walton, Fred Glatz, William Cessar, Bob Pollock, Bob Ballock, Ed Bose, Bill Schmitt, Herman Canil, Howard Linn, Charles Cost, Ambrose Bagamery, Richie McCabe, Bobby Grier, Glen Dillon, Vince Scorsone, John Jacobs, Rudy Mattioli and Chester Rice.

=== at Ohio State ===
Week 7: Pitt at Ohio State

Team	1	2	3	4	Total
Pitt	0	0	0	0	0
• Ohio State	7	7	6	6	26

- Date: November 6, 1954
- Location: Ohio Stadium
  Columbus, OH
- Game start: 1:30 p.m.
- Game attendance: 77,429
- Game weather: cloudy and warm

Scoring summary
1	OSU	Bobby Watkins 1-yard run (Tad Weed kick)	OSU 7–0
2	OSU	Bill Michael 14-yard pass from Dave Leggett (Weed kick)	OSU 14–0
3	OSU	Watkins 22-yard run ( Weed kick blocked by Joe Walton)	OSU 20–0
4	OSU	Ken Thompson 31-yard run (Bill Booth kick missed wide)	OSU 26–0

On November 6, the Panthers traveled to Columbus, OH to play Woody Hayes' #2- ranked Ohio State Buckeyes. The 6–0 Buckeyes were led by three All-Americans: halfback Howard Cassady, end Dean Dugger and guard Jim Reichenbach. Eight members of the squad were taken in the 1955 NFL draft. Ohio State led the all-time series 12–4–1 and had outscored the Panthers 388–173.

The two-touchdown underdog Panthers' train brought 39 squad members, the band and 2,000 fans to cheer them on. The Panthers housed at the Deshler-Hilton Hotel. Coach Hamilton made one change in the starting lineup. Richie McCabe started at halfback in place of Nick Passodelis.

The Ohio State Buckeyes extended their mastery over the Panthers with a dominating 26–0 victory. The Buckeyes scored in every quarter. Coach Hayes used 53 players in the game. The Buckeyes “rolled and pitched for 20 first downs to Pitt's five, carried on for 242 yards to 118 on the ground and outpassed their Pittsburgh guests, 83 yards to 19.” Bob Watkins scored the first touchdown on a 1-yard run and the third touchdown on a 22-yard end run. Bill Michael caught a 14-yard touchdown pass from quarterback Dave Leggett right before halftime and Ken Thompson's 31-yard sprint closed the scoring in the last period. Ted Weed added the extra points after the first two scores. Corny Salvaterra completed 1 of 9 passes for 10 yards and had 2 intercepted. He gained 22 yards rushing on 9 carries. The leading ground gainer for the Panthers was Richie McCabe with 23 yards on 4 carries. Watkins led the Buckeyes with 52 yards on 17 carries. Howard Cassady gained 33 yards on 4 carries.

The Pitt starting lineup for the game against Ohio State was Bob McQuaide (left end), Lou Palatella (left tackle), Harold Hunter (left guard), John Cenci (center), Al Bolkovac (right guard), Eldred Kraemer (right tackle), Joe Paluck (right end), Corny Salvaterra (quarterback), Henry Ford (left halfback), Richie McCabe (right halfback) and Tom Jenkins (fullback). Substitutes appearing in the game for Pitt were Joe Walton, Fred Glatz, William Cessar, Ed Bose, Bill Schmitt, Herman Canil, Howard Linn, Darrell Lewis, Charles Cost, Nick Passodelis, Ambrose Bagamery, Bobby Grier, Glen Dillon, Vince Scorsone, Bob Rosborough, John Jacobs and Chester Rice.

=== At Nebraska ===
Week 8: Pitt at Nebraska

Team	1	2	3	4	Total
• Pitt	0	0	14	7	21
Nebraska	0	0	7	0	7

- Date: November 13, 1954
- Location: Memorial Stadium (Lincoln)
  Lincoln, NE
- Game start: 2:00 p.m.
- Game attendance: 26,622
- Game weather: cloudy and warm
- Referee: Ron Gibbs (St. Thomas)

Scoring summary
3	PITT	Bobby Grier 3-yard run (Ambrose Bagamery kick)	PITT 7–0
3	PITT	Bagamery 3-yard run (Bagamery kick)	PITT 14–0
3	NEBR	Ron Clark 57-yard pass from Willie Greenlaw (Bob Smith kick)	PITT 14–7
4	PITT	Bob Ballock 6-yard interception return (Bagamery kick)	PITT 21–7

The Panthers final road trip was a flight to Omaha, NE to play Pitt grad Bill Glassford's Nebraska Cornhuskers in Lincoln, NE. The Huskers were 5–2 for the season. Pitt led the all-time series 12–3–3 and was unbeaten in Lincoln.

The Panthers contingent flew into Omaha on Friday and practiced at the Omaha Stadium. They bussed to Lincoln on Saturday morning. Coach Hamilton told The Lincoln Star: “I started the second team because the first team had looked flat in practice.”

Pitt kept it's unbeaten record in Lincoln intact with a 21–7 victory over the Cornhuskers. After a scoreless first half, the Panthers scored on a 6-play, 62 yard drive. Corky Cost's 40 yard run took the ball to the 6-yard line. On second down, Bobby Grier went through center for the last 3 yards. Ambrose Bagamery added the extra point for a 7–0 lead. The Panthers added another touchdown in the third quarter. Pitt center Ed Bose intercepted a pass and carried the ball to the Nebraska 30-yard line. On the seventh play Bagamery scored from three yards out and then kicked the extra point for a 14–0 lead with less than a minute to go in the quarter. Nebraska scored 30 seconds later on a 57-yard touchdown pass from Willie Greenlaw to Ron Clark. Bob Smith's placement made the score 14–7. In the final period, Pitt center Bob Bollock intercepted a pass on the Huskers 6-yard line and raced into the end zone. Bagamery's placement made the final score 21–7.

The Panthers gained 254 yards rushing and held the Huskers to 82 yards. The leaders were Corky Cost with 7 carries for 78 yards, Bobby Grier with 12 carries for 74 yards and Corny Salvaterra with 7 carries for 43 yards.

The Pitt starting lineup for the game against Nebraska was Joe Walton (left end), Bob Pollock (left tackle), John Cenci (left guard), Ed Bose (center), Bill Schmitt (right guard), Herman Canil (right tackle), John Paluck (right end), Darrell Lewis (quarterback), Charles Cost (left halfback), Ambrose Bagamery (right halfback) and Bobby Grier (fullback). Substitutes appearing in the game for Pittsburgh were Bob McQuaide, Fred Glatz, Bob Rosborough, Lou Palatella, Eldred Kraemer, Bill Cessar, Howard Linn, Howard Hunter, Al Bolkovac, Bob Ballock, Corny Salvaterra, Henry Ford, Nick Passodelis, Tom Jenkins, Richie McCabe, Chester Rice, John Jacobs and Jim Lenhart.

On November 16, Coach Lowell P. Dawson resigned as Pitt coach and stated he was going into private business. He told the Post-Gazette: “I knew we had good material at Pitt. I didn't worry when a few fans hollered about losing. Any coach should be glad to inherit this Pitt team. I know we were over-scheduled early. The result of the USC game had nothing to do with my notifying Pitt that I was through. I had made up my mind to quit after this season long before that.”

=== Penn State ===
Week 9: Penn State at Pitt

Team	1	2	3	4	Total
• Penn State	0	6	7	0	13
Pitt	0	0	0	0	0

- Date: November 20, 1954
- Location: Pitt Stadium
  Pittsburgh, PA
- Game start: 1:30 p.m.
- Game attendance: 41,451
- Game weather: steady drizzle
- Referee: J. R. Coles (Westminster)

Scoring summary
2	PSU	Jack Sherry caught a 19-yard pass from Bob Hoffman (Buddy Rowell missed the extra point)	PSU 6–0
3	PSU	Don Bailey 3-yard run (Jim Garrity kick)	PSU 13–0

On November 21, the Panthers concluded their season with the annual game against Penn State. Rip Engle's Nittanies were 6–2 on the season and led by future All-Pros - halfback Lenny Moore and tackle Rosey Grier. Pitt led the all-time series 30–21–2, but Penn State had won 3 of the past 4 games.

Fifteen Panthers wore the blue and gold for the final time – Bill Cessar, John Jacobs, Bob McQuaide, Lou Palatella, Eldred Kraemer, Don Schlick, Ray Macedonia, Chris Copetas, Richie McCabe, Chester Rice, Bob Kennedy, Glen Dillon, Henry Ford, Bob Ballock and Rudy Mattioli. Halfback Nick Passodelis was injured in the Nebraska game and did not play. Coach Hamilton decided to start his first team in this game. Coach Dawson was in attendance.

41,451 rain-dampened fans saw Penn State make it 4 victories out of the past 5 games, and 3 shutouts in a row, with a 13–0 win over the Panthers. In the second quarter, sub-quarterback Bob Hoffman threw a 19-yard touchdown pass to Jack Sherry capping a 55-yard drive. Buddy Rowell missed the point after. In the third period, first-string quarterback Don Bailey capped a 56-yard drive with a 3-yard sneak for the touchdown. Jim Garrity's placement ended the scoring. Lenny Moore was held to 68 yards on 16 carries. It was the only game in 1954 in which he did not score a touchdown. The Panthers gained 185 yards rushing: Corky Cost gained 48 yards on 9 carries; Henry Ford gained 45 yards on 10 carries; Corny Salvaterra gained 41 yards on 11 carries and Bobby Grier gained 41 yards on 9 carries.

The Pitt starting lineup for the game against Penn State was Bob McQuaide (left end), Lou Palatella (left tackle), Harold Hunter (left guard), Bob Ballock (center), Al Bolkovac (right guard), Eldred Kraemer (right tackle), Fred Glatz (right end), Corny Salvaterra (quarterback), Henry Ford (left halfback), Richie McCabe (right halfback) and Tom Jenkins (fullback). Substitutes appearing in the game for Pitt were Joe Walton, Joe Paluck, Dale Brown, William Cessar, Bob Pollock, Ed Bose, Bill Schmitt, John Cenci, Herman Canil, Darrell Lewis, Charles Cost, Ambrose Bagamery, Bobby Grier, Bob Rosborough, John Jacobs, Jim Lenhart, Bill Hoffman and Chester Rice.

== Postseason ==
Eldred Kraemer was selected by both the International News Service and Central Press Association to their All-American second team. He was also chosen to play, along with end Robert McQuaide, in the East-West Shrine Game on New Year's Day in San Francisco.

The two line coaches recruited by Coach Dawson, Bill Bevan and Bob Friedlund, resigned after the final game.

On December 1 at halftime of the opening basketball game, Athletic Director Tom Hamilton announced the Panthers football squad voted center John Cenci and guard Harold Hunter co-captains for the 1955 season.

On December 6, Athletic Director Tom Hamilton announced that John Michelosen had been approved by the Athletic Committee, the Board of Trustees and Chancellor Rufus Fitzgerald to be the eighth head coach of the University of Pittsburgh since the departure of Jock Sutherland in 1938.

== Coaching staff ==
1954 Pittsburgh Panthers football staff
Coaching staff: Lowell Dawson – head coach; Bill Bevan – head line coach; Bob Friedlund – defensive line coach; John Michelosen – backfield coach; Robert Timmons – end coach; Ernie Hefferle – offensive line coach; Steve Petro – freshman coach; Walter Cummins– assistant freshman coach; Carl DePasqua – assistant freshman coach	Support staff: Thomas J. Hamilton – athletic director; Walter P. Cummins – assistant athletic director; Robert Wycoff – athletic news service director; Howard Waite – trainer; Roger McGill – assistant trainer; Bill Haines – equipment manager; Frank Carver - graduate manager; Wally Luthy– student manager

== Roster ==
1954 Pittsburgh Panthers football roster
Player	Position	Games	Weight	Height	Class	Prep School	Hometown
Don Agafon	tackle	0	220	6 ft 2 in	junior	Berwick H.S.	Berwick, PA
Bill Amos	quarterback	1	190	6 ft 1 in	junior	Washington H. S./Univ. of Maryland	Washington, PA
Ambrose Bagamery*	right halfback	9	180	6 ft	sophomore	Zelienople H. S.	Zelienople, PA
Bob Ballock*	center	6	195	6 ft	senior	Farrell H. S.	Farrell, PA
Walt Bielich	end	0	190	6 ft 1 in	junior	Youngstown H. S.	Youngstown, PA
Al Bolkovac*	guard	9	200	6 ft	junior	Youngstown H. S.	Youngstown, OH
Ed Bose*	center	6	210	6 ft	junior	Old Westbury H. S.	Old Westbury, NY
Dale Brown	end	3	185	6 ft	sophomore	Elwood City H. S.	Elwood City, PA
Charles Brueckman	center	0	200	6 ft 2 in	sophomore	McKees Rocks H. S.	McKees Rocks, PA
Herman Canil*	tackle	7	200	6 ft 1 in	sophomore	Vandrgrift H. S.	Vandergrift, PA
John Cenci*	guard	9	210	5 ft 11 in	junior	Schenley H. S.	Pittsburgh, PA
William Cessar*	tackle	6	210	6 ft 1 in	junior	Millvale H. S.	Millvale, PA
Frank Cicero	center	0	180	5 ft 11 in	sophomore	Sewickly H. S.	Sewickly, PA
Lou Cimarolli	halfback	1	175	5 ft 10 in	junior	Bridgeville H. S.	Bridgeville, PA
Ralph Ciper	fullback	0	190	5 ft 10 in	sophomore	Ambridge H. S.	Ambridge, PA
Chris Copetas	tackle	0	200	6 ft	junior	Mt. Lebanon H. S.	Pittsburgh, PA
Chuck Cost*	left halfback	9	170	5 ft 9 in	sophomore	Wilkinsburg H. S.	Wilkinsburg, PA
Glenn Dillon	end	3	180	6 ft	senior	Titusville H. S.	Titusville, PA
Ray DiPasquale	right halfback	0	185	5 ft 10 in	junior	Central Catholic H. S.	Pittsburgh, PA
Henry Ford *	left halfback	9	180	5 ft 10 in	senior	Schenley H. S.	Pittsburgh, PA
Fred Glatz*	end	7	190	6 ft 1 in	junior	Central Catholic H. S.	Pittsburgh, PA
Bob Grier*	fullback	8	200	6 ft 1 in	junior	Massillon H. S.	Massillon, OH
Bill Hoffman	fullback	1	195	5 ft 11 in	senior	Greensburg H. S.	Greensburg, PA
Harold Hunter*	guard	9	200	6 ft 1 in	senior	Canonsburg H. S.	Canonsburg, PA
John Jacobs*	fullback	6	195	5 ft 11 in	senior	Georges Twp. H. S.	Georges Twp., PA
Tom Jenkins*	fullback	8	185	6 ft	sophomore	East Liverpool H. S.	East Liverpool, OH
Paul Kacik	left end	0	185	6 ft 1 in	junior	Monessen H. S.	Monessen, PA
Bob Kennedy	left end	0	185	5 ft 11 in	senior	Williamsport H. S.	Williamsport, PA
Bob Kiesel	fullback	0	210	6 ft	junior	Scranton H. S.	Scranton, PA
Eldred Kraemer*	right tackle	9	220	6 ft 3 in	senior	Clear Lake H. S.	Clear Lake, MN
Jim Lenhart*	quarterback	6	190	6 ft 1 in	sophomore	Charleroi H. S.	Fairmont, WV
Darrell Lewis*	quarterback	6	185	5 ft 10 in	sophomore	Wilkinsburg H. S	Wilkinsburg, PA
Howard Linn*	right tackle	8	205	6 ft	junior	Steubenville H.S.	Steubenville, OH
Joe Los	right guard	5	210	6 ft 1in	junior	Ellworth H. S.	Ellsworth, PA
Ray Macedonia	right end	0	190	6 ft	senior	Oliver H. S.	Pittsburgh, PA
Dick Manson	left halfback	0	190	5 ft 10 in	junior	Franklin H. S.	Franklin, PA
Rudy Mattioli	quarterback	3	190	6 ft	senior	Har-Brack H. S./ Univ. of Kentucky	Har-Brack, PA
Joe Mazur	left end	0	185	5 ft 11 in	sophomore	Trafford H. S.	Trafford, PA
Richie McCabe*	right halfback	9	170	6 ft	senior	North Catholic H. S.	Pittsburgh, PA
Robert McQuaide*	left end	9	185	6 ft	senior	Indiana H. S.	Indiana, PA
Don Michaels	fullback	1	190	6 ft	junior	Beaverdale H. S.	Beaverdale, PA
Pete Neft	quarterback	3	175	6 ft	junior	Peabody H. S.	Pittsburgh, PA
Louis Palatella*	left tackle	9	215	6 ft	junior	Vandergrift H.S.	Vandergrift, PA
Joe Paluck*	right end	9	215	6 ft 1 in	junior	Swoyersville H. S.	Swoyersville, PA
Nick Passodelis*	right halfback	8	180	5 ft 10 in	sophomore	Aliquippa H. S.	Aliquippa, PA
Bob Pollock*	left tackle	7	215	6 ft 2 in	sophomore	Mt. Carmel H. S.	Mt. Carmel, PA
Chester Rice*	left halfback	5	180	5 ft 10 in	senior	Derry Twp. High School	Derry Township, PA
Bob Rosborough*	right end	5	185	6 ft 1 in	sophomore	Donora H. S.	Donora, PA
Cornelius Salvaterra*	left halfback	8	190	6 ft	sophomore	Wilkes-Barre H. S.	Wilkes-Barre, PA
Dick Scherer	right end	3	200	6 ft 1 in	sophomore	North Catholic H. S.	Pittsburgh, PA
Donald Schlick	center	0	200	6 ft	senior	Wheeling H. S.	Wheeling, WV
William Schmitt*	right guard/tackle	9	215	6 ft 1 in	junior	South Hills H. S.	Pittsburgh, PA
Vince Scorsone	right guard	3	220	6 ft	sophomore	McKeesport H. S.	McKeesport, PA
Gene Steratore*	right halfback	2	190	6 ft	junior	Washington H. S.	Washington, PA
Ed Stowe	left guard	5	205	5 ft 11 in	junior	Somerville H. S.	Somerville, NJ
Bob Verna	left tackle	0	200	6 ft	junior	Conemaugh Twp. H. S.	Jerome, PA
Joe Walton*	left end	8	215	5 ft 11 in	sophomore	Beaver Falls H. S.	Beaver Falls, PA
Dan Wisniewski	left guard	0	205	5 ft 11 in	sophomore	Erie H. S.	Erie, PA
* Letterman

== Individual scoring summary ==
1954 Pittsburgh Panthers scoring summary
Player	Touchdowns	Extra points	Field goals	Safety	Points
Ambrose Bagamery	2	10	0	0	22
Henry Ford	3	0	0	0	18
Corny Salvaterra	3	0	0	0	18
Bobby Grier	1	0	0	0	6
Robert Ballock	1	0	0	0	6
Dick Scherer	1	0	0	0	6
Fred Glatz	1	0	0	0	6
Gene Steratore	0	1	0	0	1
Totals	12	11	0	0	83

== Team players drafted into the NFL ==
The following players were selected in the 1955 NFL draft.

Player	Position	Round	Pick	NFL club
Eldred Kraemer	guard	5	58	San Francisco 49ers
Henry Ford	halfback	9	109	Cleveland Browns
Glen Dillon	end	10	121	Cleveland Browns
Lou Palatella	guard	12	141	San Francisco 49ers
Richie McCabe	defensive back	22	258	Pittsburgh Steelers
Paul Blanda	back	27	320	New York Giants
