= 1954 Juniata Indians football team =

American college football season

1954 Juniata Indians football
- Conference: Independent
- Record: 8–0
- Head coach: Robert C. Hicks (1st season)
- Captain: Joe Veto
- Home stadium: College Field

1954 Eastern college football independents records
| | Conf. | | | Overall |
| Team | W | L | T | W | | L | | T |
|---|---|---|---|---|---|---|---|---|
| Hobart | | – | | 8 | – | 0 | – | 0 |
| Juniata | | – | | 8 | – | 0 | – | 0 |
| Pennsylvania Military | | – | | 7 | – | 0 | – | 0 |
| Trinity (CT) | | – | | 7 | – | 0 | – | 0 |
| Worcester Tech | | – | | 6 | – | 0 | – | 0 |
| Carnegie Tech | | – | | 7 | – | 0 | – | 1 |
| Boston College | | – | | 8 | – | 1 | – | 0 |
| Boston University | | – | | 7 | – | 2 | – | 0 |
| Hofstra | | – | | 7 | – | 2 | – | 0 |
| No. 20 Penn State | | – | | 7 | – | 2 | – | 0 |
| Tufts | | – | | 6 | – | 2 | – | 0 |
| Brown | | – | | 6 | – | 2 | – | 1 |
| Drexel | | – | | 5 | – | 2 | – | 0 |
| Bucknell | | – | | 6 | – | 3 | – | 0 |
| Colgate | | – | | 5 | – | 2 | – | 2 |
| Princeton | | – | | 5 | – | 3 | – | 1 |
| Yale | | – | | 5 | – | 3 | – | 1 |
| Cornell | | – | | 5 | – | 4 | – | 0 |
| Harvard | | – | | 4 | – | 3 | – | 1 |
| Syracuse | | – | | 4 | – | 4 | – | 0 |
| Pittsburgh | | – | | 4 | – | 5 | – | 0 |
| Franklin & Marshall | | – | | 3 | – | 5 | – | 0 |
| Temple | | – | | 3 | – | 5 | – | 0 |
| Dartmouth | | – | | 3 | – | 6 | – | 0 |
| Holy Cross | | – | | 3 | – | 7 | – | 0 |
| Buffalo | | – | | 2 | – | 7 | – | 0 |
| Fordham | | – | | 1 | – | 7 | – | 1 |
| Columbia | | – | | 1 | – | 8 | – | 0 |
| Villanova | | – | | 1 | – | 9 | – | 0 |
| Penn | | – | | 0 | – | 9 | – | 0 |
Rankings from AP Poll

The 1954 Juniata Indians football team was an American football team that represented Juniata College as an independent during the 1954 college football season. In their first year under head coach Robert C. Hicks, the Indians compiled a perfect 8–0 record and outscored opponents by a total of 221 to 50. The 1954 season was part of a seven-year run from 1953 to 1959 during which Juniata compiled a record of 50–2–2, including five undefeated seasons.

Tackle and place-kicker Joe Veto was the team captain and was also selected by the Associated Press as a first-team player on the 1954 Little All-America college football team. Five Juniata players received recognition on the Associated Press All-Pennsylvania collegiate team: Veto (first team); quarterback Pat Tarquinio (first team); guard Myron Sevick (third team); end Barry Drexler (honorable mention); and center John Staley (honorable mention).

The team played its home games at College Field in Huntingdon, Pennsylvania.

== Schedule ==
| Date | Opponent | Site | Result | Attendance | Source |
|---|---|---|---|---|---|
| October 2 | Moravian | College Field; Huntingdon, PA | W 14–12 | | |
| October 9 | Haverford^{†} | College Field; Huntingdon, PA | W 14–6 | | |
| October 16 | at Lycoming | Williamsport, PA | W 20–0 | | |
| October 23 | Dickinson | College Field; Huntingdon, PA | W 31–0 | | |
| October 30 | at Susquehanna | Selinsgrove, PA | W 46–6 | | |
| November 6 | at Grove City | Grove City, PA | W 29–20 | | |
| November 13 | at Swarthmore | Alumni Field; Swarthmore, PA | W 39–0 | 1,200 | |
| November 20 | at Ursinus | Patterson Field; Collegeville, PA | W 28–6 | 1,000 | |
^{†}Homecoming
