= 1954 Drexel Dragons football team =

American college football season

1954 Drexel Dragons football
- Conference: Independent
- Record: 5–2
- Head coach: Eddie Allen (5th season)
- Captains: Jim Hart; Auggie Campiglia
- Home stadium: Drexel Field

1954 Eastern college football independents records
	Conf.			Overall
Team	W	L	T	W		L		T
Hobart		–		8	–	0	–	0
Juniata		–		8	–	0	–	0
Pennsylvania Military		–		7	–	0	–	0
Trinity (CT)		–		7	–	0	–	0
Worcester Tech		–		6	–	0	–	0
Carnegie Tech		–		7	–	0	–	1
Boston College		–		8	–	1	–	0
Boston University		–		7	–	2	–	0
Hofstra		–		7	–	2	–	0
No. 20 Penn State		–		7	–	2	–	0
Tufts		–		6	–	2	–	0
Brown		–		6	–	2	–	1
Drexel		–		5	–	2	–	0
Bucknell		–		6	–	3	–	0
Colgate		–		5	–	2	–	2
Princeton		–		5	–	3	–	1
Yale		–		5	–	3	–	1
Cornell		–		5	–	4	–	0
Harvard		–		4	–	3	–	1
Syracuse		–		4	–	4	–	0
Pittsburgh		–		4	–	5	–	0
Franklin & Marshall		–		3	–	5	–	0
Temple		–		3	–	5	–	0
Dartmouth		–		3	–	6	–	0
Holy Cross		–		3	–	7	–	0
Buffalo		–		2	–	7	–	0
Fordham		–		1	–	7	–	1
Columbia		–		1	–	8	–	0
Villanova		–		1	–	9	–	0
Penn		–		0	–	9	–	0
Rankings from AP Poll

The 1954 Drexel Dragons football team represented the Drexel Institute of Technology (renamed Drexel University in 1970) as an independent during the 1954 college football season. Eddie Allen was the team's head coach.

== Schedule ==
Date	Time	Opponent	Site	Result	Attendance	Source
October 2		West Chester	Drexel Field; Philadelphia, PA	L 0–22		
October 9		at Ursinus	Collegeville, PA	W 41–13		
October 16		at Franklin & Marshall	Williamson Field; Lancaster, PA	L 7–12	4,000	
October 23	2:00	Lycoming^{†}	Drexel Field; Philadelphia, PA	W 40–0		
October 30		at Johns Hopkins	Homewood Field; Baltimore, MD	W 27–0		
November 6		Western Maryland	Drexel Field; Philadelphia, PA	W 34–13		
November 13		at Coast Guard	New London, CT	W 26–6		
^{†}Homecoming; All times are in Eastern time

== Roster ==
1954 Drexel Dragons football team roster
Players
Coaches
Offense

Pos.	#	Name	Class
TE		Lou Cobano
TE		Bob Glazier
OT		Vince Vidas	So
OT		Nels Sugart
G, DE		Fred Ulmer
G	38	Jim Hart (C)	Sr
C		Ev Gest
HB	14	Auggie Campiglia (C)
HB		Art DelCampo
FB		Kenny Pastor
QB		Bill Zador	So
QB		George Meyers	Sr
G		Jack Eidenberg (injured)
[[American football positions|]]		Wally Johnson
[[American football positions|]]		Ron Kleppinger

Defense

Pos.	#	Name	Class

Special teams

Pos.	#	Name	Class

Head coach

- Eddie Allen (Penn)

Coordinators/assistant coaches

- Jack Hinkle (Syracuse)
- Gene Hug (Drexel)

Legend

- (C) Team captain
- (S) Suspended
- (I) Ineligible
- Injured
- Redshirt

== Awards ==
Fred Ulmer

- All-East Team
