= 1954 Pennsylvania Military Cadets football team =

American college football season

1954 Pennsylvania Military Cadets football
- Conference: Independent
- Record: 7–0
- Head coach: George Hansell (9th season)
- Home stadium: P.M.C. Stadium

1954 Eastern college football independents records
	Conf.			Overall
Team	W	L	T	W		L		T
Hobart		–		8	–	0	–	0
Juniata		–		8	–	0	–	0
Pennsylvania Military		–		7	–	0	–	0
Trinity (CT)		–		7	–	0	–	0
Worcester Tech		–		6	–	0	–	0
Carnegie Tech		–		7	–	0	–	1
Boston College		–		8	–	1	–	0
Boston University		–		7	–	2	–	0
Hofstra		–		7	–	2	–	0
No. 20 Penn State		–		7	–	2	–	0
Tufts		–		6	–	2	–	0
Brown		–		6	–	2	–	1
Drexel		–		5	–	2	–	0
Bucknell		–		6	–	3	–	0
Colgate		–		5	–	2	–	2
Princeton		–		5	–	3	–	1
Yale		–		5	–	3	–	1
Cornell		–		5	–	4	–	0
Harvard		–		4	–	3	–	1
Syracuse		–		4	–	4	–	0
Pittsburgh		–		4	–	5	–	0
Franklin & Marshall		–		3	–	5	–	0
Temple		–		3	–	5	–	0
Dartmouth		–		3	–	6	–	0
Holy Cross		–		3	–	7	–	0
Buffalo		–		2	–	7	–	0
Fordham		–		1	–	7	–	1
Columbia		–		1	–	8	–	0
Villanova		–		1	–	9	–	0
Penn		–		0	–	9	–	0
Rankings from AP Poll

The 1954 Pennsylvania Military Cadets football team was an American football team that represented the Pennsylvania Military College (PMC) in Chester, Pennsylvania (now known as Widener University) as an independent during the 1954 college football season. In their ninth year under head coach George Hansell, the team compiled a perfect 7–0 record and outscored opponents by a total of 166 to 54. It was the first unbeaten and untied season in PMC history.

The team played at P.M.C. Stadium home games in Chester, Pennsylvania.

== Schedule ==
Date	Opponent	Site	Result	Attendance	Source
October 2	Western Maryland	P.M.C. Stadium; Chester, PA	W 24–0		
October 16	Moravian	P.M.C. Stadium; Chester, PA	W 27–20	4,000	
October 23	at Wagner	Staten Island, NY	W 21–12		
October 30	Lycoming	P.M.C. Stadium; Chester, PA	W 21–0		
November 6	at Dickinson	Biddle Field; Carlisle, PA	W 6–2	3,500	
November 13	Lebanon Valley^{†}	P.M.C. Stadium; Chester, PA	W 39–14	5,000	
November 20	at Albright	Reading, PA	W 28–6		
^{†}Homecoming
