= 1954 Villanova Wildcats football team =

American college football season

1954 Villanova Wildcats football
- Conference: Independent
- Record: 1–9
- Head coach: Frank Reagan (1st season)
- Captain: Michael Maycock
- Home stadium: Philadelphia Municipal Stadium

1954 Eastern college football independents records
	Conf.			Overall
Team	W	L	T	W		L		T
Hobart		–		8	–	0	–	0
Juniata		–		8	–	0	–	0
Pennsylvania Military		–		7	–	0	–	0
Trinity (CT)		–		7	–	0	–	0
Worcester Tech		–		6	–	0	–	0
Carnegie Tech		–		7	–	0	–	1
Boston College		–		8	–	1	–	0
Boston University		–		7	–	2	–	0
Hofstra		–		7	–	2	–	0
No. 20 Penn State		–		7	–	2	–	0
Tufts		–		6	–	2	–	0
Brown		–		6	–	2	–	1
Drexel		–		5	–	2	–	0
Bucknell		–		6	–	3	–	0
Colgate		–		5	–	2	–	2
Princeton		–		5	–	3	–	1
Yale		–		5	–	3	–	1
Cornell		–		5	–	4	–	0
Harvard		–		4	–	3	–	1
Syracuse		–		4	–	4	–	0
Pittsburgh		–		4	–	5	–	0
Franklin & Marshall		–		3	–	5	–	0
Temple		–		3	–	5	–	0
Dartmouth		–		3	–	6	–	0
Holy Cross		–		3	–	7	–	0
Buffalo		–		2	–	7	–	0
Fordham		–		1	–	7	–	1
Columbia		–		1	–	8	–	0
Villanova		–		1	–	9	–	0
Penn		–		0	–	9	–	0
Rankings from AP Poll

The 1954 Villanova Wildcats football team represented the Villanova University during the 1954 college football season. The head coach was Frank Reagan, coaching his first season with the Wildcats. The team played their home games at Villanova Stadium in Villanova, Pennsylvania.

== Schedule ==
Date	Time	Opponent	Site	Result	Attendance	Source
September 25		at Syracuse	Archbold Stadium; Syracuse, NY	L 6–28	25,000	
October 2		No. 8 Ole Miss	Philadelphia Municipal Stadium; Philadelphia, PA	L 0–52	95,607	
October 9		at Florida State	Doak Campbell Stadium; Tallahassee, FL	L 13–52		
October 16		at Detroit	University of Detroit Stadium; Detroit, MI	L 0–20	4,650	
October 22		Houston	Philadelphia Municipal Stadium; Philadelphia, PA	L 7–28	57,817	
October 30		at Kentucky	Stoll Field/McLean Stadium; Lexington, KY	L 3–28	20,000–22,500	
November 6	1:30 p.m.	at Boston University	University Field; Boston, MA	L 6–28	13,000	
November 13		at Mississippi Southern	Ladd Stadium; Mobile, AL	L 19–31	14,617	
November 20		at Vanderbilt	Dudley Field; Nashville, TN	L 19–34	12,000–12,500	
November 27		at Fordham	Polo Grounds; New York, NY	W 41–0	9,699	
Rankings from AP Poll released prior to the game; All times are in Eastern time
