= 1954 Hobart Statesmen football team =

American college football season

1954 Hobart Statesmen football
- Conference: Independent
- Record: 8–0
- Head coach: Eddie Tryon (9th season)
- Captain: Bill Morton
- Home stadium: Boswell Field

1954 Eastern college football independents records
| | Conf. | | | Overall |
| Team | W | L | T | W | | L | | T |
|---|---|---|---|---|---|---|---|---|
| Hobart | | – | | 8 | – | 0 | – | 0 |
| Juniata | | – | | 8 | – | 0 | – | 0 |
| Pennsylvania Military | | – | | 7 | – | 0 | – | 0 |
| Trinity (CT) | | – | | 7 | – | 0 | – | 0 |
| Worcester Tech | | – | | 6 | – | 0 | – | 0 |
| Carnegie Tech | | – | | 7 | – | 0 | – | 1 |
| Boston College | | – | | 8 | – | 1 | – | 0 |
| Boston University | | – | | 7 | – | 2 | – | 0 |
| Hofstra | | – | | 7 | – | 2 | – | 0 |
| No. 20 Penn State | | – | | 7 | – | 2 | – | 0 |
| Tufts | | – | | 6 | – | 2 | – | 0 |
| Brown | | – | | 6 | – | 2 | – | 1 |
| Drexel | | – | | 5 | – | 2 | – | 0 |
| Bucknell | | – | | 6 | – | 3 | – | 0 |
| Colgate | | – | | 5 | – | 2 | – | 2 |
| Princeton | | – | | 5 | – | 3 | – | 1 |
| Yale | | – | | 5 | – | 3 | – | 1 |
| Cornell | | – | | 5 | – | 4 | – | 0 |
| Harvard | | – | | 4 | – | 3 | – | 1 |
| Syracuse | | – | | 4 | – | 4 | – | 0 |
| Pittsburgh | | – | | 4 | – | 5 | – | 0 |
| Franklin & Marshall | | – | | 3 | – | 5 | – | 0 |
| Temple | | – | | 3 | – | 5 | – | 0 |
| Dartmouth | | – | | 3 | – | 6 | – | 0 |
| Holy Cross | | – | | 3 | – | 7 | – | 0 |
| Buffalo | | – | | 2 | – | 7 | – | 0 |
| Fordham | | – | | 1 | – | 7 | – | 1 |
| Columbia | | – | | 1 | – | 8 | – | 0 |
| Villanova | | – | | 1 | – | 9 | – | 0 |
| Penn | | – | | 0 | – | 9 | – | 0 |
Rankings from AP Poll

The 1954 Hobart Statesmen football team was an American football team that represented Hobart College as an independent during the 1954 college football season. In their ninth year under head coach Eddie Tryon, the Statesmen compiled an 8–0 record and outscored opponents by a total of 257 to 53. It was the first perfect season in the 63-year history of the Hobart football program. The team played its home games at Boswell Field in Geneva, New York.

== Schedule ==
| Date | Opponent | Site | Result | Attendance | Source |
|---|---|---|---|---|---|
| September 25 | Wagner | Boswell Field; Geneva, NY | W 40–6 | 1,800 | |
| October 2 | at Allegheny | Meadville, PA | W 32–7 | | |
| October 9 | Buffalo | Boswell Field; Geneva, NY | W 45–0 | | |
| October 16 | at Kenyon | Gambier, OH | W 33–0 | | |
| October 23 | Union (NY)^{†} | Boswell Field; Geneva, NY | W 32–21 | 2,500 | |
| October 30 | at St. Lawrence | Canton, NY | W 20–6 | | |
| November 6 | Hamilton | Boswell Field; Geneva, NY | W 42–7 | 3,300 | |
| November 13 | Alfred | Boswell Field; Geneva, NY | W 13–6 | 4,700 | |
^{†}Homecoming
