= 1954 Worcester Tech Engineers football team =

College football season

1954 Worcester Tech Engineers football
- Conference: Independent
- Record: 6–0
- Head coach: Robert W. Pritchard (8th season)
- Home stadium: Alumni Stadium

1954 Eastern college football independents records
	Conf.			Overall
Team	W	L	T	W		L		T
Hobart		–		8	–	0	–	0
Juniata		–		8	–	0	–	0
Pennsylvania Military		–		7	–	0	–	0
Trinity (CT)		–		7	–	0	–	0
Worcester Tech		–		6	–	0	–	0
Carnegie Tech		–		7	–	0	–	1
Boston College		–		8	–	1	–	0
Boston University		–		7	–	2	–	0
Hofstra		–		7	–	2	–	0
No. 20 Penn State		–		7	–	2	–	0
Tufts		–		6	–	2	–	0
Brown		–		6	–	2	–	1
Drexel		–		5	–	2	–	0
Bucknell		–		6	–	3	–	0
Colgate		–		5	–	2	–	2
Princeton		–		5	–	3	–	1
Yale		–		5	–	3	–	1
Cornell		–		5	–	4	–	0
Harvard		–		4	–	3	–	1
Syracuse		–		4	–	4	–	0
Pittsburgh		–		4	–	5	–	0
Franklin & Marshall		–		3	–	5	–	0
Temple		–		3	–	5	–	0
Dartmouth		–		3	–	6	–	0
Holy Cross		–		3	–	7	–	0
Buffalo		–		2	–	7	–	0
Fordham		–		1	–	7	–	1
Columbia		–		1	–	8	–	0
Villanova		–		1	–	9	–	0
Penn		–		0	–	9	–	0
Rankings from AP Poll

The 1954 Worcester Tech Engineers football team was an American football team that represented the Worcester Polytechnic Institute (WPI) as an independent during the 1954 college football season. In their eighth year under head coach Robert W. Pritchard, the Engineers compiled a 6–0 record and outscored opponents by a total of 161 to 13. The 1954 season was one of three perfect seasons in Worcester Tech's football history, the others being 1938 and 1983.

== Schedule ==
Date	Opponent	Site	Result	Attendance	Source
October 2	at Brooklyn	Brooklyn, NY	W 61–0		
October 9	Massachusetts Maritime	Alumni Stadium; Worcester, MA	W 26–7		
October 16	at Wesleyan	Middletown, CT	W 9–0		
October 23	Coast Guard	Alumni Stadium; Worcester, MA	W 6–0		
October 30	at RPI	Troy, NY	W 26–6		
November 6	Norwich	Alumni Stadium; Worcester, MA	W 33–0		
