= 1954 Trinity Bantams football team =

American college football season

1954 Trinity Bantams football
- Conference: Independent
- Record: 7–0
- Head coach: Dan Jessee (20th season)
- Home stadium: Trinity Field

1954 Eastern college football independents records
	Conf.			Overall
Team	W	L	T	W		L		T
Hobart		–		8	–	0	–	0
Juniata		–		8	–	0	–	0
Pennsylvania Military		–		7	–	0	–	0
Trinity (CT)		–		7	–	0	–	0
Worcester Tech		–		6	–	0	–	0
Carnegie Tech		–		7	–	0	–	1
Boston College		–		8	–	1	–	0
Boston University		–		7	–	2	–	0
Hofstra		–		7	–	2	–	0
No. 20 Penn State		–		7	–	2	–	0
Tufts		–		6	–	2	–	0
Brown		–		6	–	2	–	1
Drexel		–		5	–	2	–	0
Bucknell		–		6	–	3	–	0
Colgate		–		5	–	2	–	2
Princeton		–		5	–	3	–	1
Yale		–		5	–	3	–	1
Cornell		–		5	–	4	–	0
Harvard		–		4	–	3	–	1
Syracuse		–		4	–	4	–	0
Pittsburgh		–		4	–	5	–	0
Franklin & Marshall		–		3	–	5	–	0
Temple		–		3	–	5	–	0
Dartmouth		–		3	–	6	–	0
Holy Cross		–		3	–	7	–	0
Buffalo		–		2	–	7	–	0
Fordham		–		1	–	7	–	1
Columbia		–		1	–	8	–	0
Villanova		–		1	–	9	–	0
Penn		–		0	–	9	–	0
Rankings from AP Poll

The 1954 Trinity Bantams football team was an American football team that represented Trinity College of Hartford, Connecticut, as an independent during the 1954 college football season. In their 20th season under head coach Dan Jessee, the Bantams compiled a perfect 7–0 record and outscored opponents by a total of 216 to 58.

The season was part of a 15-game winning streak that began with the last game of the 1953 season and included back-to-back perfect seasons in 1954 and 1955. It was one of several perfect seasons for the Trinity football program, including 1934, 1949, 1955, 1993, 2003, 2004, 2005, 2008, 2012, 2016, and 2022.

The team played its home games at Trinity Field in Hartford.

== Schedule ==
Date	Opponent	Site	Result	Attendance	Source
September 28	Williams	Trinity Field; Hartford, CT	W 38–0		
October 2	Bowdoin	Trinity Field; Hartford, CT	W 28–14		
October 9	at Tufts	Tufts Oval; Medford, MA	W 27–6		
October 16	at St. Lawrence	Weeks Field; Canton, NY	W 34–6		
October 30	Coast Guard	Trinity Field; Hartford, CT	W 42–6	4,000	
November 6	Amherst	Trinity Field; Hartford, CT	W 21–12	7,000	
November 13	at Wesleyan	Andrus Field; Middletown, CT (rivalry)	W 26–14	6,500	
