= 1954 Boston College Eagles football team =

American college football season

1954 Boston College Eagles football
- Conference: Independent
- Record: 8–1
- Head coach: Mike Holovak (4th season)
- Captain: Joe Mattaliano
- Home stadium: Fenway Park

1954 Eastern college football independents records
	Conf.			Overall
Team	W	L	T	W		L		T
Hobart		–		8	–	0	–	0
Juniata		–		8	–	0	–	0
Pennsylvania Military		–		7	–	0	–	0
Trinity (CT)		–		7	–	0	–	0
Worcester Tech		–		6	–	0	–	0
Carnegie Tech		–		7	–	0	–	1
Boston College		–		8	–	1	–	0
Boston University		–		7	–	2	–	0
Hofstra		–		7	–	2	–	0
No. 20 Penn State		–		7	–	2	–	0
Tufts		–		6	–	2	–	0
Brown		–		6	–	2	–	1
Drexel		–		5	–	2	–	0
Bucknell		–		6	–	3	–	0
Colgate		–		5	–	2	–	2
Princeton		–		5	–	3	–	1
Yale		–		5	–	3	–	1
Cornell		–		5	–	4	–	0
Harvard		–		4	–	3	–	1
Syracuse		–		4	–	4	–	0
Pittsburgh		–		4	–	5	–	0
Franklin & Marshall		–		3	–	5	–	0
Temple		–		3	–	5	–	0
Dartmouth		–		3	–	6	–	0
Holy Cross		–		3	–	7	–	0
Buffalo		–		2	–	7	–	0
Fordham		–		1	–	7	–	1
Columbia		–		1	–	8	–	0
Villanova		–		1	–	9	–	0
Penn		–		0	–	9	–	0
Rankings from AP Poll

The 1954 Boston College Eagles football team represented Boston College as an independent during the 1954 college football season. In its fourth season under head coach Mike Holovak, the team compiled an 8–1 record and outscored opponents by a combined total of 196 to 74. The team's sole loss was to Xavier; Xavier broke a 12-game winless streak with the victory over BC.

The team played its home games at Fenway Park in Boston.

== Schedule ==
Date	Opponent	Site	Result	Attendance	Source
September 25	at Detroit	University of Detroit Stadium; Detroit, MI	W 12–7	13,750	
October 2	at Temple	Temple Stadium; Philadelphia, PA	W 12–9	5,000	
October 9	VMI	Fenway Park; Boston, MA	W 44–0	7,941	
October 16	at Fordham	Polo Grounds; New York, NY	W 21–7	13,676	
October 23	Springfield (MA)	Fenway Park; Boston, MA	W 42–6	5,400	
October 30	Xavier	Fenway Park; Boston, MA	L 14–19	4,972	
November 5	at Marquette	Marquette Stadium; Milwaukee, WI	W 13–7	15,000	
November 13	Boston University	Fenway Park; Boston, MA (rivalry)	W 7–6	40,542	
November 27	Holy Cross	Fenway Park; Boston, MA (rivalry)	W 31–13	40,642	
