= 1954 Buffalo Bulls football team =

American college football season

1954 Buffalo Bulls football
- Conference: Independent
- Record: 2–7
- Head coach: Fritz Febel (3rd season)
- Captain: Ernie Keifer
- Home stadium: Civic Stadium

1954 Eastern college football independents records
| | Conf. | | | Overall |
| Team | W | L | T | W | | L | | T |
|---|---|---|---|---|---|---|---|---|
| Hobart | | – | | 8 | – | 0 | – | 0 |
| Juniata | | – | | 8 | – | 0 | – | 0 |
| Pennsylvania Military | | – | | 7 | – | 0 | – | 0 |
| Trinity (CT) | | – | | 7 | – | 0 | – | 0 |
| Worcester Tech | | – | | 6 | – | 0 | – | 0 |
| Carnegie Tech | | – | | 7 | – | 0 | – | 1 |
| Boston College | | – | | 8 | – | 1 | – | 0 |
| Boston University | | – | | 7 | – | 2 | – | 0 |
| Hofstra | | – | | 7 | – | 2 | – | 0 |
| No. 20 Penn State | | – | | 7 | – | 2 | – | 0 |
| Tufts | | – | | 6 | – | 2 | – | 0 |
| Brown | | – | | 6 | – | 2 | – | 1 |
| Drexel | | – | | 5 | – | 2 | – | 0 |
| Bucknell | | – | | 6 | – | 3 | – | 0 |
| Colgate | | – | | 5 | – | 2 | – | 2 |
| Princeton | | – | | 5 | – | 3 | – | 1 |
| Yale | | – | | 5 | – | 3 | – | 1 |
| Cornell | | – | | 5 | – | 4 | – | 0 |
| Harvard | | – | | 4 | – | 3 | – | 1 |
| Syracuse | | – | | 4 | – | 4 | – | 0 |
| Pittsburgh | | – | | 4 | – | 5 | – | 0 |
| Franklin & Marshall | | – | | 3 | – | 5 | – | 0 |
| Temple | | – | | 3 | – | 5 | – | 0 |
| Dartmouth | | – | | 3 | – | 6 | – | 0 |
| Holy Cross | | – | | 3 | – | 7 | – | 0 |
| Buffalo | | – | | 2 | – | 7 | – | 0 |
| Fordham | | – | | 1 | – | 7 | – | 1 |
| Columbia | | – | | 1 | – | 8 | – | 0 |
| Villanova | | – | | 1 | – | 9 | – | 0 |
| Penn | | – | | 0 | – | 9 | – | 0 |
Rankings from AP Poll

The 1954 Buffalo Bulls football team was an American football team that represented the University of Buffalo as an independent during the 1954 college football season. In its third and final season under head coach Fritz Febel, the team compiled a 2–7 record. The team played its home games at Civic Stadium in Buffalo, New York.

== Schedule ==
| Date | Opponent | Site | Result | Attendance | Source |
|---|---|---|---|---|---|
| September 25 | at Cortland | Cortland, NY | L 6–20 | | |
| October 2 | Brockport | Civic Stadium; Buffalo, NY | L 6–19 | | |
| October 9 | at Hobart | Geneva, NY | L 0–45 | | |
| October 16 | Lafayette | Civic Stadium; Buffalo, NY | L 0–26 | 2,000 | |
| October 23 | at Western Reserve | Clarke Field; Cleveland, OH | L 7–34 | | |
| October 30 | Alfred | Civic Stadium; Buffalo, NY | L 0–25 | | |
| November 6 | St. Lawrence | Civic Stadium; Buffalo, NY | W 13–6 | | |
| November 13 | Brandeis | Civic Stadium; Buffalo, NY | L 20–52 | | |
| November 20 | at RPI | Troy, NY | W 20–19 | | |
