= 1954 Bucknell Bison football team =

American college football season

1954 Bucknell Bison football
- Conference: Independent
- Record: 6–3
- Head coach: Harry Lawrence (8th season)
- Captain: John Chironna
- Home stadium: Memorial Stadium

1954 Eastern college football independents records
| | Conf. | | | Overall |
| Team | W | L | T | W | | L | | T |
|---|---|---|---|---|---|---|---|---|
| Hobart | | – | | 8 | – | 0 | – | 0 |
| Juniata | | – | | 8 | – | 0 | – | 0 |
| Pennsylvania Military | | – | | 7 | – | 0 | – | 0 |
| Trinity (CT) | | – | | 7 | – | 0 | – | 0 |
| Worcester Tech | | – | | 6 | – | 0 | – | 0 |
| Carnegie Tech | | – | | 7 | – | 0 | – | 1 |
| Boston College | | – | | 8 | – | 1 | – | 0 |
| Boston University | | – | | 7 | – | 2 | – | 0 |
| Hofstra | | – | | 7 | – | 2 | – | 0 |
| No. 20 Penn State | | – | | 7 | – | 2 | – | 0 |
| Tufts | | – | | 6 | – | 2 | – | 0 |
| Brown | | – | | 6 | – | 2 | – | 1 |
| Drexel | | – | | 5 | – | 2 | – | 0 |
| Bucknell | | – | | 6 | – | 3 | – | 0 |
| Colgate | | – | | 5 | – | 2 | – | 2 |
| Princeton | | – | | 5 | – | 3 | – | 1 |
| Yale | | – | | 5 | – | 3 | – | 1 |
| Cornell | | – | | 5 | – | 4 | – | 0 |
| Harvard | | – | | 4 | – | 3 | – | 1 |
| Syracuse | | – | | 4 | – | 4 | – | 0 |
| Pittsburgh | | – | | 4 | – | 5 | – | 0 |
| Franklin & Marshall | | – | | 3 | – | 5 | – | 0 |
| Temple | | – | | 3 | – | 5 | – | 0 |
| Dartmouth | | – | | 3 | – | 6 | – | 0 |
| Holy Cross | | – | | 3 | – | 7 | – | 0 |
| Buffalo | | – | | 2 | – | 7 | – | 0 |
| Fordham | | – | | 1 | – | 7 | – | 1 |
| Columbia | | – | | 1 | – | 8 | – | 0 |
| Villanova | | – | | 1 | – | 9 | – | 0 |
| Penn | | – | | 0 | – | 9 | – | 0 |
Rankings from AP Poll

The 1954 Bucknell Bison football team was an American football team that represented Bucknell University as an independent during the 1954 college football season.

In its eighth season under head coach Harry Lawrence, the team compiled a 6–3 record. John Chironna was the team captain.

The team played its home games at Memorial Stadium on the university campus in Lewisburg, Pennsylvania.

== Schedule ==
| Date | Opponent | Site | Result | Attendance | Source |
|---|---|---|---|---|---|
| September 25 | vs. Muhlenberg | Hershey Stadium; Hershey, PA (Rotary Bowl) | W 33–13 | 7,500 | |
| October 2 | Gettysburg | Memorial Stadium; Lewisburg, PA | W 29–0 | 8,000 | |
| October 9 | Lehigh | Memorial Stadium; Lewisburg, PA | W 48–46 | 4,500 | |
| October 16 | at Temple | Temple Stadium; Philadelphia, PA | W 27–0 | 7,500 | |
| October 23 | Lafayette^{†} | Memorial Stadium; Lewisburg, PA | W 7–0 | 7,000 | |
| October 30 | at Boston University | Boston University Field; Boston, MA | L 7–20 | 11,500 | |
| November 6 | at Colgate | Colgate Athletic Field; Hamilton, NY | L 14–20 | 6,000 | |
| November 13 | Albright | Memorial Stadium; Lewisburg, PA | W 27–0 | 4,500 | |
| November 20 | at Delaware | Delaware Stadium; Newark, DE | L 0–20 | 6,256 | |
^{†}Homecoming
