= 1954 Boston University Terriers football team =

American college football season

1954 Boston University Terriers football
- Conference: Independent
- Record: 7–2
- Head coach: Aldo Donelli (8th season)
- Home stadium: University Field

1954 Eastern college football independents records
	Conf.			Overall
Team	W	L	T	W		L		T
Hobart		–		8	–	0	–	0
Juniata		–		8	–	0	–	0
Pennsylvania Military		–		7	–	0	–	0
Trinity (CT)		–		7	–	0	–	0
Worcester Tech		–		6	–	0	–	0
Carnegie Tech		–		7	–	0	–	1
Boston College		–		8	–	1	–	0
Boston University		–		7	–	2	–	0
Hofstra		–		7	–	2	–	0
No. 20 Penn State		–		7	–	2	–	0
Tufts		–		6	–	2	–	0
Brown		–		6	–	2	–	1
Drexel		–		5	–	2	–	0
Bucknell		–		6	–	3	–	0
Colgate		–		5	–	2	–	2
Princeton		–		5	–	3	–	1
Yale		–		5	–	3	–	1
Cornell		–		5	–	4	–	0
Harvard		–		4	–	3	–	1
Syracuse		–		4	–	4	–	0
Pittsburgh		–		4	–	5	–	0
Franklin & Marshall		–		3	–	5	–	0
Temple		–		3	–	5	–	0
Dartmouth		–		3	–	6	–	0
Holy Cross		–		3	–	7	–	0
Buffalo		–		2	–	7	–	0
Fordham		–		1	–	7	–	1
Columbia		–		1	–	8	–	0
Villanova		–		1	–	9	–	0
Penn		–		0	–	9	–	0
Rankings from AP Poll

The 1954 Boston University Terriers football team was an American football team that represented Boston University as an independent during the 1954 college football season. In its eighth season under head coach Aldo Donelli, the team compiled a 7–2 record and outscored opponents by a total of 256 to 93.

== Schedule ==
Date	Time	Opponent	Site	Result	Attendance	Source
September 25		Brandeis	University Field; Boston, MA	W 33–0		
October 2		at Connecticut	Memorial Stadium; Storrs, CT	W 41–13		
October 9		Fordham	University Field; Boston, MA	W 55–20	18,000	
October 16		Syracuse	University Field; Boston, MA	W 41–19	20,500	
October 23		at Holy Cross	Fitton Field; Worcester, MA	L 13–14	12,000	
October 30		Bucknell	University Field; Boston, MA	W 20–7	11,500	
November 6	1:30 p.m.	Villanova	University Field; Boston, MA	W 28–6	13,000	
November 13		at Boston College	Fenway Park; Boston, MA (rivalry)	L 6–7	40,542	
November 20		at Temple	Temple Stadium; Philadelphia, PA	W 19–7	3,500	
All times are in Eastern time
