= 1954 Fordham Rams football team =

American college football season

1954 Fordham Rams football
- Conference: Independent
- Record: 1–7–1
- Head coach: Ed Danowski (9th season)
- Home stadium: Polo Grounds

1954 Eastern college football independents records
	Conf.			Overall
Team	W	L	T	W		L		T
Hobart		–		8	–	0	–	0
Juniata		–		8	–	0	–	0
Pennsylvania Military		–		7	–	0	–	0
Trinity (CT)		–		7	–	0	–	0
Worcester Tech		–		6	–	0	–	0
Carnegie Tech		–		7	–	0	–	1
Boston College		–		8	–	1	–	0
Boston University		–		7	–	2	–	0
Hofstra		–		7	–	2	–	0
No. 20 Penn State		–		7	–	2	–	0
Tufts		–		6	–	2	–	0
Brown		–		6	–	2	–	1
Drexel		–		5	–	2	–	0
Bucknell		–		6	–	3	–	0
Colgate		–		5	–	2	–	2
Princeton		–		5	–	3	–	1
Yale		–		5	–	3	–	1
Cornell		–		5	–	4	–	0
Harvard		–		4	–	3	–	1
Syracuse		–		4	–	4	–	0
Pittsburgh		–		4	–	5	–	0
Franklin & Marshall		–		3	–	5	–	0
Temple		–		3	–	5	–	0
Dartmouth		–		3	–	6	–	0
Holy Cross		–		3	–	7	–	0
Buffalo		–		2	–	7	–	0
Fordham		–		1	–	7	–	1
Columbia		–		1	–	8	–	0
Villanova		–		1	–	9	–	0
Penn		–		0	–	9	–	0
Rankings from AP Poll

The 1954 Fordham Rams football team represented Fordham University as an independent during the 1954 college football season. The Rams went 1–7–1 and amassed 96 points while their defense allowed 292 points. It was their worst season since the winless 1946 campaign. Shortly afterwards, and following a disastrous, 41–0 season finale home loss to previously winless (0–9) Villanova, head coach Ed Danowski resigned. Speculation grew around five coaches, all former Fordham players, rumored as replacements. In order of likeliness the candidates were Vince Lombardi, at the time a backfield coach with the New York Giants; Johnny Druze, at the time a line coach with Notre Dame; Harry Jacunski, at the time a line coach with Yale and two long shots who were each successful in the high school ranks. They were Ray Riddick, at the time head coach of Lowell High School's powerhouse program in Massachusetts and Leo Paquin, in charge of Xavier High School's program in Manhattan.

In the end none of the five were chosen. Instead, sighting poor attendance numbers and financial losses of $100,000 per year, the school decided to drop its football program on December, 15th.

Alumni, many hoping Lombardi would be named head coach, led a campaign to cover all operating costs for the 1955 season and honor an already announced schedule in the process. The university however stood by their decision. After more pushing, the alumni movement was finally abandoned in May, 1955. The school lost the services of freshmen quarterbacks Chuck Zimmerman and Jim Reese who had platooned the freshman team to a promising 3-1 record. Reese transferred to Minnesota where in 1958 he became the first Golden Gopher to throw for 200 yards in a game. Zimmerman transferred to Syracuse where in that same season he threw for over 700 yards while leading the Orangemen to the Orange Bowl.

== Schedule ==
Date	Opponent	Site	Result	Attendance	Source
October 2	at Rutgers	Rutgers Stadium; Piscataway, NJ	W 13–7	10,000	
October 9	at Boston University	Boston University Field; Boston, MA	L 20–55	18,000	
October 16	Boston College	Polo Grounds; New York, NY	L 7–21	13,676	
October 23	at Marquette	Marquette Stadium; Milwaukee, WI	T 14–14	19,500	
October 29	at No. 10 Miami (FL)	Burdine Stadium; Miami, FL	L 7–75	37,498	
November 6	at No. 17 West Virginia	Mountaineer Field; Morgantown, WV	L 9–39	10,000	
November 13	Holy Cross	Polo Grounds; New York, NY	L 19–20	13,557	
November 20	Syracuse	Polo Grounds; New York, NY	L 7–20	10,423	
November 27	Villanova	Polo Grounds; New York, NY	L 0–41	9,699	
Rankings from AP Poll released prior to the game
