= 1954 Temple Owls football team =

American college football season

1954 Temple Owls football
- Conference: Independent
- Record: 3–5
- Head coach: Albert Kawal (6th season)
- Home stadium: Temple Stadium

1954 Eastern college football independents records
	Conf.			Overall
Team	W	L	T	W		L		T
Hobart		–		8	–	0	–	0
Juniata		–		8	–	0	–	0
Pennsylvania Military		–		7	–	0	–	0
Trinity (CT)		–		7	–	0	–	0
Worcester Tech		–		6	–	0	–	0
Carnegie Tech		–		7	–	0	–	1
Boston College		–		8	–	1	–	0
Boston University		–		7	–	2	–	0
Hofstra		–		7	–	2	–	0
No. 20 Penn State		–		7	–	2	–	0
Tufts		–		6	–	2	–	0
Brown		–		6	–	2	–	1
Drexel		–		5	–	2	–	0
Bucknell		–		6	–	3	–	0
Colgate		–		5	–	2	–	2
Princeton		–		5	–	3	–	1
Yale		–		5	–	3	–	1
Cornell		–		5	–	4	–	0
Harvard		–		4	–	3	–	1
Syracuse		–		4	–	4	–	0
Pittsburgh		–		4	–	5	–	0
Franklin & Marshall		–		3	–	5	–	0
Temple		–		3	–	5	–	0
Dartmouth		–		3	–	6	–	0
Holy Cross		–		3	–	7	–	0
Buffalo		–		2	–	7	–	0
Fordham		–		1	–	7	–	1
Columbia		–		1	–	8	–	0
Villanova		–		1	–	9	–	0
Penn		–		0	–	9	–	0
Rankings from AP Poll

The 1954 Temple Owls football team was an American football team that represented Temple University as an independent during the 1954 college football season. In its sixth and final season under head coach Albert Kawal, the team compiled a 3–5 record. The team played its home games at Temple Stadium in Philadelphia.

== Schedule ==
Date	Opponent	Site	Result	Attendance	Source
October 2	Boston College	Temple Stadium; Philadelphia, PA	L 9–12	5,000	
October 9	at Delaware	Delaware Stadium; Newark, DE	L 13–51	6,435	
October 16	Bucknell^{†}	Temple Stadium; Philadelphia, PA	L 0–27	7,500	
October 23	at Brown	Brown Stadium; Providence, RI	W 19–14	8,000	
October 30	at Rutgers	Rutgers Stadium; New Brunswick, NJ	L 0–25	3,500	
November 6	Brandeis	Temple Stadium; Philadelphia, PA	W 27–0	3,500	
November 13	at Scranton	Memorial Stadium; Scranton, PA	W 20–0	6,554	
November 20	Boston University	Temple Stadium; Philadelphia, PA	L 7–19	3,500	
^{†}Homecoming
