= 1954 Penn State Nittany Lions football team =

American college football season

1954 Penn State Nittany Lions football
- Conference: Independent

Ranking
- Coaches: No. 16
- AP: No. 20
- Record: 7–2
- Head coach: Rip Engle (5th season)
- Captains: Don Balthaser; Jim Garrity
- Home stadium: New Beaver Field

1954 Eastern college football independents records
	Conf.			Overall
Team	W	L	T	W		L		T
Hobart		–		8	–	0	–	0
Juniata		–		8	–	0	–	0
Pennsylvania Military		–		7	–	0	–	0
Trinity (CT)		–		7	–	0	–	0
Worcester Tech		–		6	–	0	–	0
Carnegie Tech		–		7	–	0	–	1
Boston College		–		8	–	1	–	0
Boston University		–		7	–	2	–	0
Hofstra		–		7	–	2	–	0
No. 20 Penn State		–		7	–	2	–	0
Tufts		–		6	–	2	–	0
Brown		–		6	–	2	–	1
Drexel		–		5	–	2	–	0
Bucknell		–		6	–	3	–	0
Colgate		–		5	–	2	–	2
Princeton		–		5	–	3	–	1
Yale		–		5	–	3	–	1
Cornell		–		5	–	4	–	0
Harvard		–		4	–	3	–	1
Syracuse		–		4	–	4	–	0
Pittsburgh		–		4	–	5	–	0
Franklin & Marshall		–		3	–	5	–	0
Temple		–		3	–	5	–	0
Dartmouth		–		3	–	6	–	0
Holy Cross		–		3	–	7	–	0
Buffalo		–		2	–	7	–	0
Fordham		–		1	–	7	–	1
Columbia		–		1	–	8	–	0
Villanova		–		1	–	9	–	0
Penn		–		0	–	9	–	0
Rankings from AP Poll

The 1954 Penn State Nittany Lions football team represented the Pennsylvania State University as an independent during the 1954 college football season. The team was coached by Rip Engle and played its home games in New Beaver Field in University Park, Pennsylvania.

== Schedule ==
Date	Opponent	Rank	Site	Result	Attendance	Source
September 25	at No. 6 Illinois		Memorial Stadium; Champaign, IL	W 14–12	54,094	
October 2	at Syracuse	No. 10	Archbold Stadium; Syracuse, NY (rivalry)	W 13–0	18,000	
October 9	Virginia	No. 12	New Beaver Field; University Park, PA	W 34–7	21,820	
October 16	No. 14 West Virginia^{†}	No. 9	New Beaver Field; University Park, PA (rivalry)	L 14–19	32,221–32,384	
October 23	at No. 20 TCU		Amon G. Carter Stadium; Fort Worth, TX	L 7–20	15,000	
October 30	at Penn		Franklin Field; Philadelphia, PA	W 35–13	33,146	
November 6	Holy Cross		New Beaver Field; University Park, PA	W 39–7	25,383	
November 13	Rutgers		New Beaver Field; University Park, PA	W 37–14	16,623	
November 20	at Pittsburgh		Pitt Stadium; Pittsburgh, PA (rivalry)	W 13–0	47,266	
^{†}Homecoming; Rankings from AP Poll released prior to the game
