= 1954 Syracuse Orangemen football team =

American college football season

1954 Syracuse Orangemen football
- Conference: Independent
- Record: 4–4
- Head coach: Ben Schwartzwalder (6th season)
- Captain: Game captains
- Home stadium: Archbold Stadium

1954 Eastern college football independents records
	Conf.			Overall
Team	W	L	T	W		L		T
Hobart		–		8	–	0	–	0
Juniata		–		8	–	0	–	0
Pennsylvania Military		–		7	–	0	–	0
Trinity (CT)		–		7	–	0	–	0
Worcester Tech		–		6	–	0	–	0
Carnegie Tech		–		7	–	0	–	1
Boston College		–		8	–	1	–	0
Boston University		–		7	–	2	–	0
Hofstra		–		7	–	2	–	0
No. 20 Penn State		–		7	–	2	–	0
Tufts		–		6	–	2	–	0
Brown		–		6	–	2	–	1
Drexel		–		5	–	2	–	0
Bucknell		–		6	–	3	–	0
Colgate		–		5	–	2	–	2
Princeton		–		5	–	3	–	1
Yale		–		5	–	3	–	1
Cornell		–		5	–	4	–	0
Harvard		–		4	–	3	–	1
Syracuse		–		4	–	4	–	0
Pittsburgh		–		4	–	5	–	0
Franklin & Marshall		–		3	–	5	–	0
Temple		–		3	–	5	–	0
Dartmouth		–		3	–	6	–	0
Holy Cross		–		3	–	7	–	0
Buffalo		–		2	–	7	–	0
Fordham		–		1	–	7	–	1
Columbia		–		1	–	8	–	0
Villanova		–		1	–	9	–	0
Penn		–		0	–	9	–	0
Rankings from AP Poll

The 1954 Syracuse Orangemen football team represented Syracuse University as an independent during the 1954 college football season. The Orangemen were led by sixth-year head coach Ben Schwartzwalder and played their home games at Archbold Stadium in Syracuse, New York. Syracuse finished the season with a 4–4 record and were not invited to a bowl game.

== Schedule ==
Date	Opponent	Site	Result	Attendance	Source
September 25	Villanova	Archbold Stadium; Syracuse, NY	W 28–6	25,000	
October 2	No. 10 Penn State	Archbold Stadium; Syracuse, NY (rivalry)	L 0–13	18,000	
October 16	at Boston University	Boston University Field; Boston, MA	L 19–41	20,500	
October 23	at Illinois	Memorial Stadium; Champaign, IL	L 6–34	41,820	
October 30	Holy Cross	Archbold Stadium; Syracuse, NY	W 25–20	20,000	
November 6	at Cornell	Schoellkopf Field; Ithaca, NY	L 6–14	25,000	
November 13	Colgate	Archbold Stadium; Syracuse, NY (rivalry)	W 31–12	37,000	
November 20	at Fordham	Polo Grounds; New York, NY	W 20–7	10,423	
Rankings from AP Poll released prior to the game

== Roster ==
- HB Jim Brown, sophomore
