= 1954 Holy Cross Crusaders football team =

American college football season

1954 Holy Cross Crusaders football
- Conference: Independent
- Record: 3–7
- Head coach: Eddie Anderson (11th season)
- Captain: Louis P. Hettinger
- Home stadium: Fitton Field

1954 Eastern college football independents records
	Conf.			Overall
Team	W	L	T	W		L		T
Hobart		–		8	–	0	–	0
Juniata		–		8	–	0	–	0
Pennsylvania Military		–		7	–	0	–	0
Trinity (CT)		–		7	–	0	–	0
Worcester Tech		–		6	–	0	–	0
Carnegie Tech		–		7	–	0	–	1
Boston College		–		8	–	1	–	0
Boston University		–		7	–	2	–	0
Hofstra		–		7	–	2	–	0
No. 20 Penn State		–		7	–	2	–	0
Tufts		–		6	–	2	–	0
Brown		–		6	–	2	–	1
Drexel		–		5	–	2	–	0
Bucknell		–		6	–	3	–	0
Colgate		–		5	–	2	–	2
Princeton		–		5	–	3	–	1
Yale		–		5	–	3	–	1
Cornell		–		5	–	4	–	0
Harvard		–		4	–	3	–	1
Syracuse		–		4	–	4	–	0
Pittsburgh		–		4	–	5	–	0
Franklin & Marshall		–		3	–	5	–	0
Temple		–		3	–	5	–	0
Dartmouth		–		3	–	6	–	0
Holy Cross		–		3	–	7	–	0
Buffalo		–		2	–	7	–	0
Fordham		–		1	–	7	–	1
Columbia		–		1	–	8	–	0
Villanova		–		1	–	9	–	0
Penn		–		0	–	9	–	0
Rankings from AP Poll

The 1954 Holy Cross Crusaders football team was an American football team that represented the College of the Holy Cross as an independent during the 1954 college football season. In its 11th year under head coach Eddie Anderson, the team compiled a 3–7 record. The team played its home games at Fitton Field in Worcester, Massachusetts.

== Schedule ==
Date	Opponent	Site	Result	Attendance	Source
September 25	at Dartmouth	Memorial Field; Hanover, NH	L 26–27	9,000	
October 2	Colgate	Fitton Field; Worcester, MA	L 0–18	10,000	
October 8	at Miami (FL)	Burdine Stadium; Miami, FL	L 20–26	32,856	
October 16	Marquette^{†}	Fitton Field; Worcester, MA	L 14–19	10,000	
October 23	Boston University	Fitton Field; Worcester, MA	W 14–13	12,000	
October 30	at Syracuse	Archbold Stadium; Syracuse, NY	L 20–25	20,000	
November 6	at Penn State	New Beaver Field; State College, PA	L 7–39	25,397	
November 13	at Fordham	Polo Grounds; New York, NY	W 20–19	13,557	
November 20	Connecticut	Fitton Field; Worcester, MA	W 46–26	5,000	
November 26	at Boston College (rivalry)	Fenway Park; Boston, MA	L 7–26	40,642	
^{†}Homecoming

== Statistical leaders ==
Statistical leaders for the 1954 Crusaders included:

- Rushing: Lou Hettinger, 357 yards and 1 touchdown on 81 attempts
- Passing: Jack Stephans, 800 yards, 74 completions and 8 touchdowns on 149 attempts
- Receiving: Bob Dee, 236 yards and 2 touchdowns on 25 receptions
- Scoring: Bob Rosmario, 48 points on 8 touchdowns
- Total offense: Jack Stephans, 637 yards (800 passing, minus-163 rushing)
- All-purpose yards: Lou Hettinger, 613 yards (365 rushing, 248 receiving)
