= 1954 Colgate Red Raiders football team =

American college football season

1954 Colgate Red Raiders football
- Conference: Independent
- Record: 5–2–2
- Head coach: Hal Lahar (3rd season)
- Captain: Richard Lalla
- Home stadium: Colgate Athletic Field

1954 Eastern college football independents records
	Conf.			Overall
Team	W	L	T	W		L		T
Hobart		–		8	–	0	–	0
Juniata		–		8	–	0	–	0
Pennsylvania Military		–		7	–	0	–	0
Trinity (CT)		–		7	–	0	–	0
Worcester Tech		–		6	–	0	–	0
Carnegie Tech		–		7	–	0	–	1
Boston College		–		8	–	1	–	0
Boston University		–		7	–	2	–	0
Hofstra		–		7	–	2	–	0
No. 20 Penn State		–		7	–	2	–	0
Tufts		–		6	–	2	–	0
Brown		–		6	–	2	–	1
Drexel		–		5	–	2	–	0
Bucknell		–		6	–	3	–	0
Colgate		–		5	–	2	–	2
Princeton		–		5	–	3	–	1
Yale		–		5	–	3	–	1
Cornell		–		5	–	4	–	0
Harvard		–		4	–	3	–	1
Syracuse		–		4	–	4	–	0
Pittsburgh		–		4	–	5	–	0
Franklin & Marshall		–		3	–	5	–	0
Temple		–		3	–	5	–	0
Dartmouth		–		3	–	6	–	0
Holy Cross		–		3	–	7	–	0
Buffalo		–		2	–	7	–	0
Fordham		–		1	–	7	–	1
Columbia		–		1	–	8	–	0
Villanova		–		1	–	9	–	0
Penn		–		0	–	9	–	0
Rankings from AP Poll

The 1954 Colgate Red Raiders football team was an American football team that represented Colgate University as an independent during the 1954 college football season. In its third season under head coach Hal Lahar, the team compiled a 5–2–2 record and outscored opponents by a total of 141 to 117. Richard Lalla was the team captain. The team played its home games at Colgate Athletic Field in Hamilton, New York.

== Schedule ==
Date	Opponent	Site	Result	Attendance	Source
September 25	at Cornell	Schoellkopf Field; Ithaca, NY (rivalry)	W 19–14	16,000	
October 2	at Holy Cross	Fitton Field; Worcester, MA	W 18–0	10,000	
October 9	Rutgers^{†}	Colgate Athletic Field; Hamilton, NY	W 26–14	7,500	
October 16	at Dartmouth	Memorial Field; Hanover, NH	W 13–7	9,500	
October 23	at Yale	Yale Bowl; New Haven, CT	T 13–13	37,000	
October 30	at Princeton	Palmer Stadium; Princeton, NJ	T 6–6	23,000	
November 6	Bucknell	Colgate Athletic Field; Hamilton, NY	W 20–14	6,000	
November 13	at Syracuse	Archbold Stadium; Syracuse, NY (rivalry)	L 12–31	37,000	
November 25	at Brown	Brown Stadium; Providence, RI	L 14–18	15,000	
^{†}Homecoming
