= 1954 Rutgers Queensmen football team =

American college football season

1954 Rutgers Queensmen football

Middle Three co-champion
- Conference: Middle Three Conference
- Record: 3–6 (1–1 Middle Three)
- Head coach: Harvey Harman (13th season)
- Captains: John O'Hearn; Angelo Iannucci
- Home stadium: Rutgers Stadium

1954 Middle Three Conference football standings
	Conf.					Overall
Team	W		L		T	W		L		T
Lehigh +	1	–	1	–	0	4	–	5	–	0
Rutgers +	1	–	1	–	0	3	–	6	–	0
Lafayette +	1	–	1	–	0	2	–	5	–	2
+ – Conference co-champions

The 1954 Rutgers Queensmen football team represented Rutgers University in the 1954 college football season. In their 13th season under head coach Harvey Harman, the Queensmen compiled a 3–6 record and were outscored by their opponents 145 to 140.

== Schedule ==
Date	Opponent	Site	Result	Attendance	Source
September 25	at Princeton*	Palmer Stadium; Princeton, NJ (rivalry)	L 8–10	23,000	
October 2	Fordham*	Rutgers Stadium; Piscataway, NJ	L 7–13	10,000	
October 9	at Colgate*	Colgate Athletic Field; Hamilton, NY	L 14–26	7,500	
October 16	William & Mary*	Rutgers Stadium; Piscataway, NJ	L 7–14	9,500	
October 23	at Lehigh	Taylor Stadium; Bethlehem, PA	L 13–33	7,500	
October 30	Temple*	Rutgers Stadium; Piscataway, NJ	W 25–0	3,500	
November 6	Lafayette	Rutgers Stadium; Piscataway, NJ	W 7–0	11,000	
November 13	at Penn State*	New Beaver Field; State College, PA	L 14–37	15,200	
November 20	at Columbia*	Baker Field; New York, NY	W 45–12	9,000	
*Non-conference game
