= 1954 Lafayette Leopards football team =

American college football season

1954 Lafayette Leopards football

Middle Three co-champion
- Conference: Middle Three Conference
- Record: 7–2 (1–1 Middle Three)
- Head coach: Steve Hokuf (3rd season)
- Captain: Russell Hedden
- Home stadium: Fisher Field

1954 Middle Three Conference football standings
	Conf.					Overall
Team	W		L		T	W		L		T
Lehigh +	1	–	1	–	0	4	–	5	–	0
Rutgers +	1	–	1	–	0	3	–	6	–	0
Lafayette +	1	–	1	–	0	2	–	5	–	2
+ – Conference co-champions

The 1954 Lafayette Leopards football team was an American football team that represented Lafayette College during the 1954 college football season. Lafayette tied for the Middle Three Conference championship. In their third year under head coach Steve Hokuf, the Leopards compiled a 4–5 record. In the Middle Three Conference, all three teams finished with 1–1 records, resulting in a three-way tie. Russell Hedden was the team captain. Lafayette played home games at Fisher Field on College Hill in Easton, Pennsylvania.

== Schedule ==
Date	Opponent	Site	Result	Attendance	Source
September 25	Albright*	Fisher Field; Easton, PA	W 26–0	6,000	
October 2	Carnegie Tech*	Fisher Field; Easton, PA	L 21–23	8,000	
October 9	at Muhlenberg*	Allentown High School Stadium; Allentown, PA	L 0–27	7,500	
October 16	at Buffalo*	Civic Stadium; Buffalo, NY	W 26–0	2,000	
October 23	at Bucknell*	Memorial Stadium; Lewisburg, PA	L 0–7	7,000	
October 30	Gettysburg*	Fisher Field; Easton, PA	W 20–6	6,000	
November 6	at Rutgers	Rutgers Stadium; Piscataway, NJ	L 0–7	11,000	
November 13	at Delaware*	Delaware Stadium; Newark, DE	L 7–41	4,858	
November 20	Lehigh	Fisher Field; Easton, PA (The Rivalry)	W 46–0	17,000	
*Non-conference game
