= 1954 Lehigh Engineers football team =

American college football season

1954 Lehigh Engineers football

Middle Three co-champion
- Conference: Middle Three Conference
- Record: 2–5–2 (1–1 Middle Three)
- Head coach: Bill Leckonby (9th season)
- Captain: Harry Stotz
- Home stadium: Taylor Stadium

1954 Middle Three Conference football standings
| | Conf. | | | | | Overall |
| Team | W | | L | | T | W | | L | | T |
|---|---|---|---|---|---|---|---|---|---|---|
| Lehigh + | 1 | – | 1 | – | 0 | 4 | – | 5 | – | 0 |
| Rutgers + | 1 | – | 1 | – | 0 | 3 | – | 6 | – | 0 |
| Lafayette + | 1 | – | 1 | – | 0 | 2 | – | 5 | – | 2 |
+ – Conference co-champions

The 1954 Lehigh Engineers football team was an American football team that represented Lehigh University during the 1954 college football season. Lehigh tied for the Middle Three Conference championship.

In their ninth year under head coach Bill Leckonby, the Engineers compiled a 2–5–2 record. In the Middle Three Conference, all three teams finished with 1–1 records. Harry Stotz was the team captain.

Lehigh played its home games at Taylor Stadium on the university's main campus in Bethlehem, Pennsylvania.

== Schedule ==
| Date | Opponent | Site | Result | Attendance | Source |
|---|---|---|---|---|---|
| September 25 | at Virginia* | Scott Stadium; Charlottesville, VA | L 21–27 | 12,000 | |
| October 2 | Delaware* | Taylor Stadium; Bethlehem, PA (rivalry) | L 0–21 | 6,500 | |
| October 9 | at Bucknell* | Memorial Stadium; Lewisburg, PA | L 46–48 | 4,500 | |
| October 16 | Gettysburg* | Taylor Stadium; Bethlehem, PA | W 20–6 | 8,599 | |
| October 23 | Rutgers | Taylor Stadium; Bethlehem, PA | W 33–13 | 7,500 | |
| October 30 | Brown* | Taylor Stadium; Bethlehem, PA | L 6–34 | 6,500 | |
| November 6 | Muhlenberg* | Taylor Stadium; Bethlehem, PA | T 20–20 | 8,500 | |
| November 13 | at Carnegie Tech* | Forbes Field; Pittsburgh, PA | T 13–13 | 5,000 | |
| November 20 | at Lafayette | Fisher Field; Easton, PA (The Rivalry) | L 0–46 | 17,000 | |
*Non-conference game
