= George Hansell =

American football and track coach (1911–1998)

Biographical details
- Born: 1911; Narberth, Pennsylvania, U.S.
- Died: January 25, 1998 (aged 86–87); Springfield, Pennsylvania, U.S.

Playing career

Football
- 1930–1933: Dickinson

Coaching career (HC unless noted)

Football
- 1953–1961: Pennsylvania Military

Track
- 1946–1974: Pennsylvania Military / Widener

Head coaching record
- Overall: 50–23 (football); 138–51–1 (track)

Accomplishments and honors

Championships
- Football; 1 MAC Southern College Division (1958)

George A. Hansell Jr. (1911 – January 25, 1998) was an American football and track coach. He served as the head football coach at Pennsylvania Military College—now known Widener University from 1953 to 1961, compiling a record of 50–23. Hansell also coached track at Widener from 1946 to 1974.

== Head coaching record ==
=== Football ===
Year	Team	Overall	Conference	Standing	Bowl/playoffs
Pennsylvania Military Cadets (Independent) (1953–1957)
1953	Pennsylvania Military	2–4			
1954	Pennsylvania Military	7–0			
1955	Pennsylvania Military	5–3			
1956	Pennsylvania Military	7–2			
1957	Pennsylvania Military	5–3			
Pennsylvania Military Cadets (Middle Atlantic Conference) (1958–1961)
1958	Pennsylvania Military	7–2	7–1	1st (Southern College)	
1959	Pennsylvania Military	6–2	6–2	2nd (Southern College)	
1960	Pennsylvania Military	5–4	5–3	2nd (Southern College)	
1961	Pennsylvania Military	6–3	5–3	T–4th (Southern College)	
Widener:		50–23	23–9		
Total:		50–23			
National championship Conference title Conference division title or championship game berth
