= Columbia–Cornell football rivalry =

American college football rivalry

Cornell-Columbia football rivalry
- Columbia Lions Cornell Big Red
- Sport: Football
- First meeting: November 26, 1889; Cornell, 20–0
- Latest meeting: November 21, 2026; Columbia, 46–45^{OT}
- Next meeting: November 20, 2027; Ithaca, NY
- Trophy: Empire Cup

Statistics
- Total meetings: 113
- All-time series: Cornell leads, 66–44–3
- Trophy series: Columbia leads, 10–6
- Largest victory: Cornell, 56–0 (1922)
- Longest win streak: Cornell, 12 (1977–1988)
- Current win streak: Columbia, 6 (2021–present)

Locations of Columbia and Cornell

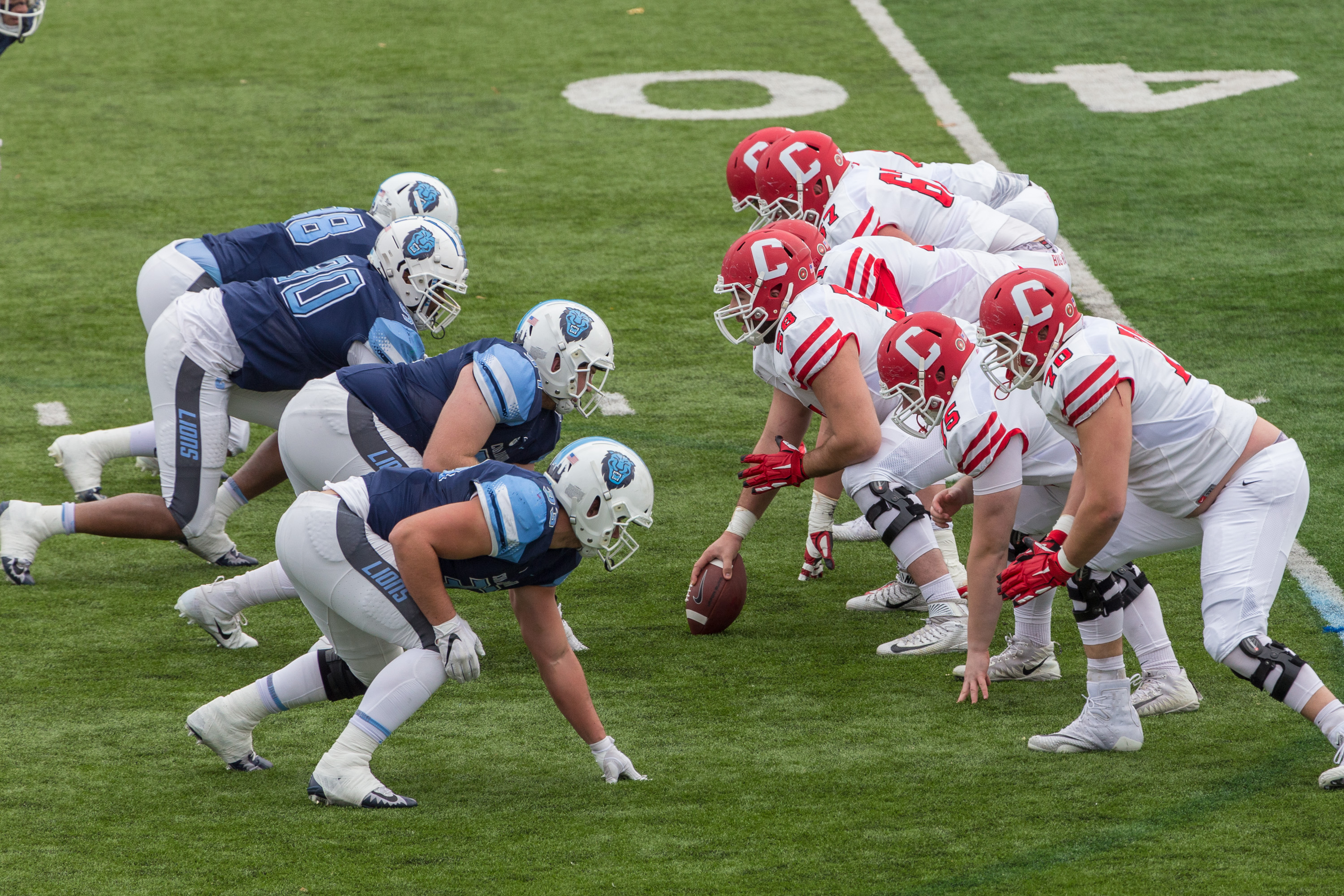
2018 Columbia-Cornell game at Wien Stadium. Columbia won 24–21 after freshman Mike Roussos returned a kickoff for a touchdown in the final minute.

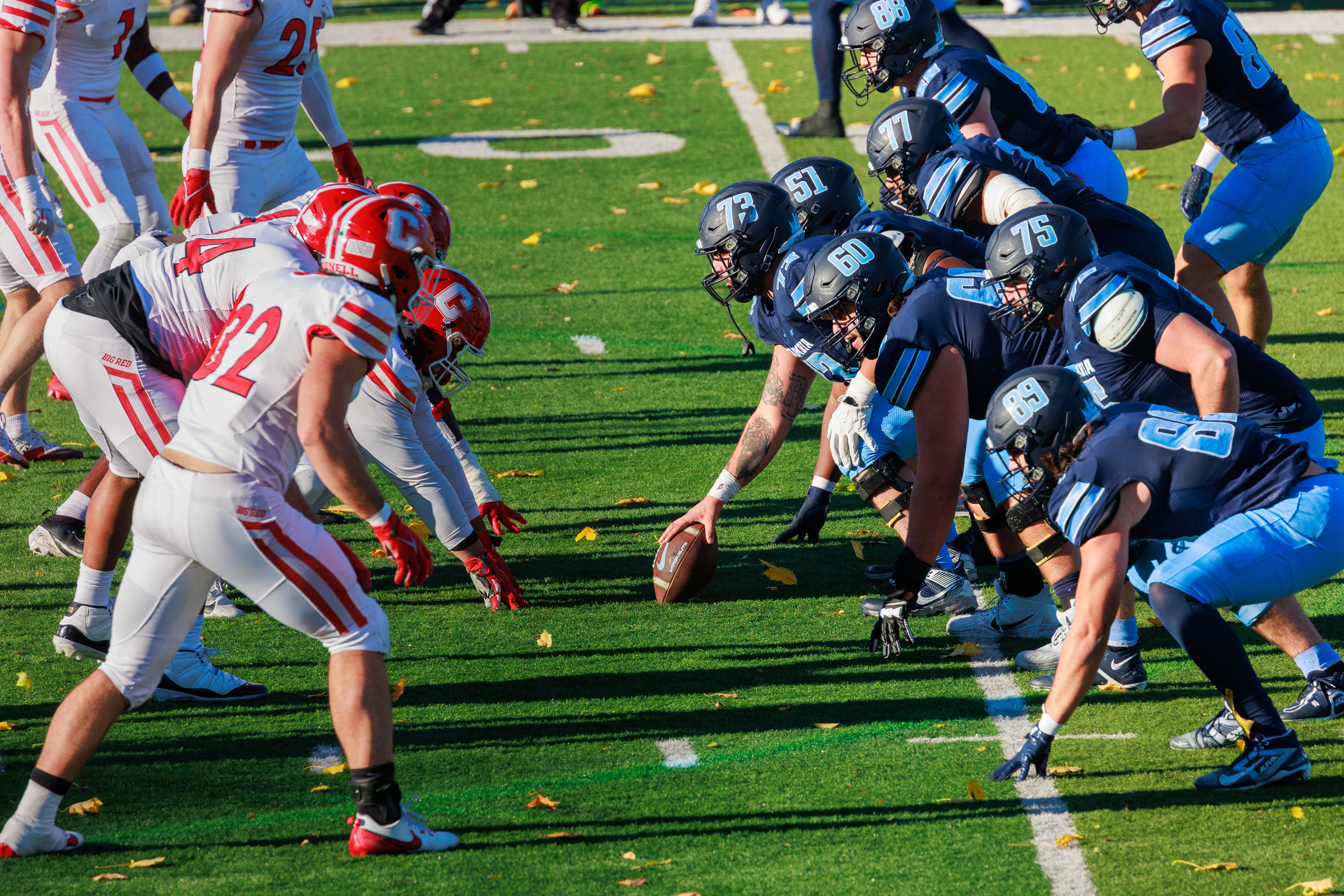
The Lions beat Cornell again in 2024

The Columbia–Cornell football rivalry is the American college football rivalry between the Columbia Lions and the Cornell Big Red, the two Ivy League teams in New York State. In 2010, the game was named the Empire State Bowl and the teams began competing for the Empire Cup. Since 2018, it has been the final game on each team's schedule.

In 2024, for the first time, the game had implications for the Ivy championship. Columbia beat Cornell 17–9 in New York to share the conference title with Dartmouth and Harvard.

== Game results ==
Columbia victories	Cornell victories	Tie games

No.	Date	Location	Winner	Score
1	November 26, 1889	New York, NY	Cornell	20–0
2	November 22, 1890	Ithaca, NY	Cornell	36–0
3	November 7, 1899	New York, NY	Cornell	29–0
4	November 16, 1901	New York, NY	Cornell	24–0
5	November 14, 1903	Ithaca, NY	Columbia	17–12
6	November 12, 1904	New York, NY	Columbia	12–6
7	November 18, 1905	Ithaca, NY	Columbia	12–6
8	November 13, 1920	Ithaca, NY	Cornell	34–7
9	November 5, 1921	New York, NY	Cornell	41–7
10	November 4, 1922	Ithaca, NY	Cornell	56–0
11	November 10, 1923	New York, NY	Cornell	35–0
12	November 1, 1924	Ithaca, NY	Cornell	14–0
13	October 31, 1925	New York, NY	Cornell	17–14
14	October 30, 1926	New York, NY	Columbia	17–9
15	October 29, 1927	Ithaca, NY	Tie	0–0
16	November 3, 1928	New York, NY	Tie	0–0
17	November 2, 1929	Ithaca, NY	Cornell	12–6
18	November 1, 1930	New York, NY	Columbia	10–7
19	October 31, 1931	Ithaca, NY	Cornell	13–0
20	October 29, 1932	New York, NY	Columbia	6–0
21	November 4, 1933	Ithaca, NY	Columbia	9–6
22	November 3, 1934	New York, NY	Columbia	14–0
23	November 2, 1935	Ithaca, NY	Tie	7–7
24	October 31, 1936	New York, NY	Columbia	20–13
25	October 30, 1937	Ithaca, NY	Cornell	14–0
26	October 29, 1938	New York, NY	Cornell	23–7
27	November 4, 1939	Ithaca, NY	Cornell	13–7
28	November 2, 1940	Ithaca, NY	Cornell	27–0
29	November 1, 1941	New York, NY	Columbia	7–0
30	October 31, 1942	New York, NY	Columbia	14–13
31	October 30, 1943	Ithaca, NY	Cornell	33–6
32	November 4, 1944	New York, NY	Cornell	25–7
33	November 3, 1945	New York, NY	Columbia	34–26
34	November 2, 1946	New York, NY	Cornell	12–0
35	November 1, 1947	Ithaca, NY	Columbia	22–0
36	October 30, 1948	New York, NY	Cornell	20–13
37	October 29, 1949	Ithaca, NY	Cornell	54–0
38	November 4, 1950	New York, NY	Columbia	20–19
39	November 3, 1951	Ithaca, NY	Columbia	21–20
40	November 1, 1952	New York, NY	Cornell	21–14
41	October 31, 1953	Ithaca, NY	Cornell	27–13
42	October 30, 1954	New York, NY	Cornell	26–0
43	October 29, 1955	Ithaca, NY	Cornell	34–19
44	November 3, 1956	New York, NY	Columbia	25–19
45	November 2, 1957	Ithaca, NY	Cornell	8–0
46	November 1, 1958	New York, NY	Cornell	25–0
47	October 31, 1959	Ithaca, NY	Cornell	13–7
48	October 29, 1960	New York, NY	Columbia	44–6
49	November 4, 1961	Ithaca, NY	Columbia	35–7
50	November 3, 1962	New York, NY	Columbia	25–21
51	November 2, 1963	Ithaca, NY	Cornell	18–17
52	October 31, 1964	New York, NY	Cornell	57–20
53	October 30, 1965	Ithaca, NY	Cornell	20–6
54	October 29, 1966	New York, NY	Cornell	31–6
55	November 4, 1967	Ithaca, NY	Cornell	27–14
56	November 2, 1968	New York, NY	Columbia	34–25
57	November 1, 1969	Ithaca, NY	Cornell	10–3

No.	Date	Location	Winner	Score
58	October 31, 1970	New York, NY	Cornell	31–20
59	October 30, 1971	Ithaca, NY	Cornell	24–21
60	November 4, 1972	New York, NY	Columbia	14–0
61	November 3, 1973	Ithaca, NY	Cornell	44–14
62	November 2, 1974	New York, NY	Cornell	24–0
63	November 1, 1975	Ithaca, NY	Columbia	42–19
64	November 6, 1976	New York, NY	Columbia	35–17
65	November 5, 1977	Ithaca, NY	Cornell	20–7
66	November 11, 1978	New York, NY	Cornell	35–14
67	November 10, 1979	Ithaca, NY	Cornell	24–7
68	November 15, 1980	New York, NY	Cornell	24–0
69	November 14, 1981	Ithaca, NY	Cornell	15–9
70	November 13, 1982	New York, NY	Cornell	35–26
71	November 12, 1983	Ithaca, NY	Cornell	31–6
72	November 10, 1984	New York, NY	Cornell	19–7
73	November 16, 1985	Ithaca, NY	Cornell	21–8
74	November 15, 1986	New York, NY	Cornell	28–0
75	November 14, 1987	Ithaca, NY	Cornell	31–20
76	November 12, 1988	New York, NY	Cornell	42–19
77	November 11, 1989	Ithaca, NY	Columbia	25–19
78	November 10, 1990	New York, NY	Cornell	41–0
79	November 16, 1991	Ithaca, NY	Cornell	28–21
80	November 14, 1992	New York, NY	Columbia	35–30
81	November 13, 1993	Ithaca, NY	Columbia	29–24
82	November 12, 1994	New York, NY	Columbia	38–33
83	November 11, 1995	Ithaca, NY	Cornell	35–14
84	November 16, 1996	New York, NY	Columbia	24–10
85	November 15, 1997	Ithaca, NY	Cornell	33–22
86	November 14, 1998	New York, NY	Columbia	22–10
87	November 13, 1999	Ithaca, NY	Cornell	31–29
88	November 11, 2000	New York, NY	Cornell	35–31
89	November 10, 2001	Ithaca, NY	Columbia	35–28
90	November 16, 2002	New York, NY	Cornell	17–14
91	November 15, 2003	Ithaca, NY	Columbia	34–21
92	November 13, 2004	New York, NY	Cornell	32–26
93	November 12, 2005	Ithaca, NY	Cornell	45–7
94	November 11, 2006	New York, NY	Columbia	21–14
95	November 10, 2007	Ithaca, NY	Cornell	34–14
96	November 15, 2008	New York, NY	Columbia	17–7
97	November 14, 2009	Ithaca, NY	Columbia	30–20
98	November 13, 2010	New York, NY	Columbia	20–17
99	November 12, 2011	Ithaca, NY	Cornell	62–41
100	November 10, 2012	New York, NY	Columbia	34–17
101	November 16, 2013	Ithaca, NY	Cornell	24–9
102	November 15, 2014	New York, NY	Cornell	30–27
103	November 14, 2015	Ithaca, NY	Cornell	3–0
104	November 12, 2016	New York, NY	Cornell	42–40
105	November 11, 2017	Ithaca, NY	Columbia	18–8
106	November 17, 2018	New York, NY	Columbia	24–21
107	November 23, 2019	Ithaca, NY	Cornell	35–9
108	November 20, 2021	Ithaca, NY	Columbia	34–26
109	November 19, 2022	New York, NY	Columbia	45–22
110	November 18, 2023	Ithaca, NY	Columbia	29–14
111	November 23, 2024	New York, NY	Columbia	17–9
112	November 22, 2025	Ithaca, NY	Columbia	29–12
113	November 21, 2026	New York, NY	Columbia	46–45^{OT}
Series: Cornell leads 66–44–3

== See also ==
- List of NCAA college football rivalry games
- List of most-played college football series in NCAA Division I
