= 1954 Penn Quakers football team =

American college football season

1954 Penn Quakers football
- Conference: Ivy League
- Record: 0–9 (0–2 Ivy)
- Head coach: Steve Sebo (1st season)
- Home stadium: Franklin Field

1954 Ivy League football standings
	Conf.					Overall
Team	W		L		T	W		L		T
Yale	4	–	2	–	0	5	–	3	–	1
Cornell	4	–	2	–	0	5	–	4	–	0
Brown	2	–	1	–	1	6	–	2	–	1
Harvard	3	–	2	–	1	4	–	3	–	1
Princeton	4	–	3	–	0	5	–	3	–	1
Dartmouth	2	–	3	–	0	3	–	6	–	0
Columbia	1	–	5	–	0	1	–	8	–	0
Penn	0	–	2	–	0	0	–	9	–	0
The Ivy League did not crown an official champion until 1956 when full league play began.

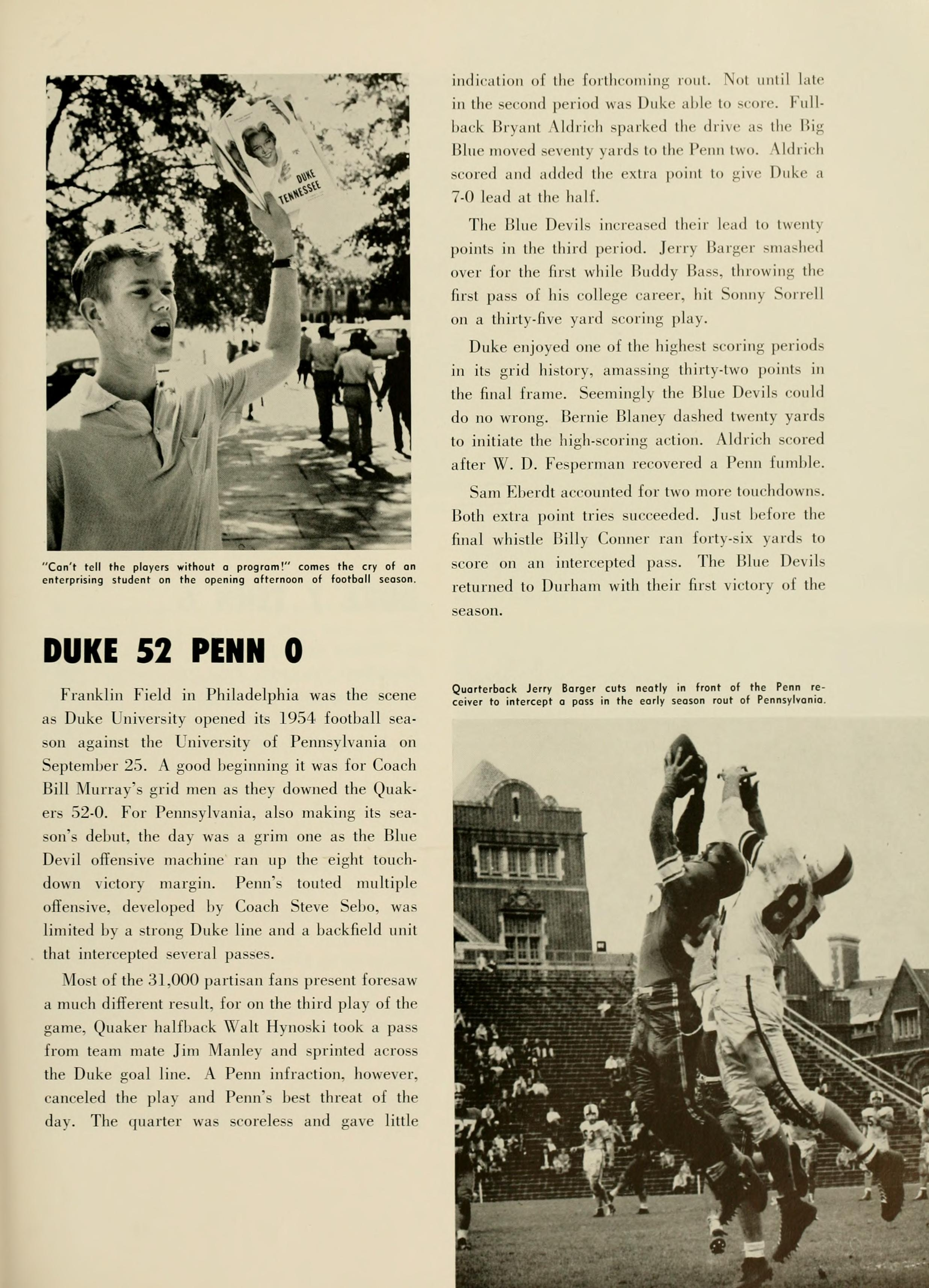

The 1954 Penn Quakers football team represented the University of Pennsylvania during the 1954 college football season.

== Schedule ==
Date	Opponent	Site	Result	Attendance	Source
September 25	No. 19 Duke	Franklin Field; Philadelphia, PA	L 0–52	31,000	
October 2	William & Mary	Franklin Field; Philadelphia, PA	L 7–27	17,000	
October 9	at Princeton	Palmer Stadium; Princeton, NJ (rivalry)	L 7–13	35,000	
October 16	George Washington	Franklin Field; Philadelphia, PA	L 27–32	24,432	
October 23	Navy	Franklin Field; Philadelphia, PA	L 6–52	41,228	
October 30	Penn State	Franklin Field; Philadelphia, PA	L 13–35	33,146	
November 6	No. 5 Notre Dame	Franklin Field; Philadelphia, PA	L 7–42	61,189	
November 13	No. 6 Army	Franklin Field; Philadelphia, PA	L 0–35	34,477	
November 25	Cornell	Franklin Field; Philadelphia, PA (rivalry)	L 6–20	26,690	
Rankings from AP Poll released prior to the game
