= 1954 Cornell Big Red football team =

American college football season

1954 Cornell Big Red football
- Conference: Ivy League
- Record: 5–4 (4–2 Ivy)
- Head coach: George K. James (8th season)
- Captain: Guy Bedrossian
- Home stadium: Schoellkopf Field

1954 Ivy League football standings
	Conf.					Overall
Team	W		L		T	W		L		T
Yale	4	–	2	–	0	5	–	3	–	1
Cornell	4	–	2	–	0	5	–	4	–	0
Brown	2	–	1	–	1	6	–	2	–	1
Harvard	3	–	2	–	1	4	–	3	–	1
Princeton	4	–	3	–	0	5	–	3	–	1
Dartmouth	2	–	3	–	0	3	–	6	–	0
Columbia	1	–	5	–	0	1	–	8	–	0
Penn	0	–	2	–	0	0	–	9	–	0
The Ivy League did not crown an official champion until 1956 when full league play began.

The 1954 Cornell Big Red football team was an American football team that represented Cornell University as an independent during the 1954 college football season. In its eighth season under head coach George K. James, the team compiled a 5–4 record and outscored its opponents 194 to 153. Guy Bedrossian was the team captain.

Cornell played its home games at Schoellkopf Field in Ithaca, New York.

== Schedule ==
Date	Opponent	Site	Result	Attendance	Source
September 25	Colgate	Schoellkopf Field; Ithaca, NY (rivalry)	L 14–19	16,000	
October 2	at No. 16 Rice	Rice Stadium; Houston, TX	L 20–41	35,000	
October 9	Harvard^{†}	Schoellkopf Field; Ithaca, NY	L 12–13	19,000	
October 16	at Yale	Yale Bowl; New Haven, CT	L 21–47	32,000	
October 23	at Princeton	Palmer Stadium; Princeton, NJ	W 27–0	30,000	
October 30	at Columbia	Baker Field; New York, NY (rivalry)	W 26–0	8,500	
November 6	Syracuse	Schoellkopf Field; Ithaca, NY	W 14–6	25,000	
November 13	Dartmouth	Schoellkopf Field; Ithaca, NY (rivalry)	W 40–21	18,000	
November 25	at Penn	Franklin Field; Philadelphia, PA (rivalry)	W 20–6	26,690	
^{†}Homecoming; Rankings from AP Poll released prior to the game
