= 1954 Dartmouth Indians football team =

American college football season

1954 Dartmouth Indians football
- Conference: Ivy League
- Record: 3–6 (2–3 Ivy)
- Head coach: Tuss McLaughry (12th season)
- Captain: Louis Turner
- Home stadium: Memorial Field

1954 Ivy League football standings
| | Conf. | | | | | Overall |
| Team | W | | L | | T | W | | L | | T |
|---|---|---|---|---|---|---|---|---|---|---|
| Yale | 4 | – | 2 | – | 0 | 5 | – | 3 | – | 1 |
| Cornell | 4 | – | 2 | – | 0 | 5 | – | 4 | – | 0 |
| Brown | 2 | – | 1 | – | 1 | 6 | – | 2 | – | 1 |
| Harvard | 3 | – | 2 | – | 1 | 4 | – | 3 | – | 1 |
| Princeton | 4 | – | 3 | – | 0 | 5 | – | 3 | – | 1 |
| Dartmouth | 2 | – | 3 | – | 0 | 3 | – | 6 | – | 0 |
| Columbia | 1 | – | 5 | – | 0 | 1 | – | 8 | – | 0 |
| Penn | 0 | – | 2 | – | 0 | 0 | – | 9 | – | 0 |
The Ivy League did not crown an official champion until 1956 when full league play began.

The 1954 Dartmouth Indians football team was an American football team that represented Dartmouth College as an independent during the 1954 college football season. In their 12th and final season under head coach Tuss McLaughry, the Indians compiled a 3–6 record, and were outscored 250 to 121. Louis Turner was the team captain.

Dartmouth played its home games at Memorial Field on the college campus in Hanover, New Hampshire.

== Schedule ==
| Date | Opponent | Site | Result | Attendance | Source |
|---|---|---|---|---|---|
| September 25 | Holy Cross | Memorial Field; Hanover, NH | W 27–26 | 9,000 | |
| October 2 | Navy | Memorial Field; Hanover, NH | L 7–42 | 13,200 | |
| October 9 | at Army | Michie Stadium; West Point, NY | L 6–60 | 23,250–33,250 | |
| October 16 | Colgate | Memorial Field; Hanover, NH | L 7–13 | 9,500 | |
| October 23 | at Harvard | Harvard Stadium; Boston, MA (rivalry) | W 13–7 | 32,000 | |
| October 30 | at Yale | Yale Bowl; New Haven, CT | L 7–13 | 30,000 | |
| November 6 | Columbia | Memorial Field; Hanover, NH | W 26–0 | 9,000 | |
| November 13 | at Cornell | Schoellkopf Field; Ithaca, NY (rivalry) | L 21–40 | 18,000 | |
| November 20 | at Princeton | Palmer Stadium; Princeton, NJ | L 7–49 | 23,000 | |
