= 1954 Yale Bulldogs football team =

American college football season

1954 Yale Bulldogs football
- Conference: Ivy League
- Record: 5–3–1 (4–2 Ivy)
- Head coach: Jordan Olivar (3rd season)
- Captain: Thorne Shugart
- Home stadium: Yale Bowl

1954 Ivy League football standings
	Conf.					Overall
Team	W		L		T	W		L		T
Yale	4	–	2	–	0	5	–	3	–	1
Cornell	4	–	2	–	0	5	–	4	–	0
Brown	2	–	1	–	1	6	–	2	–	1
Harvard	3	–	2	–	1	4	–	3	–	1
Princeton	4	–	3	–	0	5	–	3	–	1
Dartmouth	2	–	3	–	0	3	–	6	–	0
Columbia	1	–	5	–	0	1	–	8	–	0
Penn	0	–	2	–	0	0	–	9	–	0
The Ivy League did not crown an official champion until 1956 when full league play began.

The 1954 Yale Bulldogs football team represented Yale University in the 1954 college football season. The Bulldogs were led by third-year head coach Jordan Olivar, played their home games at the Yale Bowl and finished the season with a 5–3–1 record.

== Schedule ==
Date	Opponent	Site	Result	Attendance	Source
September 25	Connecticut	Yale Bowl; New Haven, CT	W 27–0	25,000	
October 2	Brown	Yale Bowl; New Haven, CT	W 26–24	27,000	
October 9	at Columbia	Baker Field; New York, NY	W 13–7	18,000	
October 16	Cornell	Yale Bowl; New Haven, CT	W 47–21	32,000	
October 23	Colgate	Yale Bowl; New Haven, CT	T 13–13	37,000	
October 30	Dartmouth	Yale Bowl; New Haven, CT	W 13–7	30,000	
November 6	No. 7 Army	Yale Bowl; New Haven, CT	L 7–48	73,600	
November 13	Princeton	Yale Bowl; New Haven, CT (rivalry)	L 14–21	11,000	
November 20	at Harvard	Harvard Stadium; Boston, MA (The Game)	L 9–13	40,000	
Rankings from AP Poll released prior to the game
