= 1954 Brown Bears football team =

American college football season

1954 Brown Bears football
- Conference: Ivy League
- Record: 6–2–1 (2–1–1 Ivy)
- Head coach: Alva Kelley (4th season)
- Captain: E. Pearson
- Home stadium: Brown Stadium

1954 Ivy League football standings
	Conf.					Overall
Team	W		L		T	W		L		T
Yale	4	–	2	–	0	5	–	3	–	1
Cornell	4	–	2	–	0	5	–	4	–	0
Brown	2	–	1	–	1	6	–	2	–	1
Harvard	3	–	2	–	1	4	–	3	–	1
Princeton	4	–	3	–	0	5	–	3	–	1
Dartmouth	2	–	3	–	0	3	–	6	–	0
Columbia	1	–	5	–	0	1	–	8	–	0
Penn	0	–	2	–	0	0	–	9	–	0
The Ivy League did not crown an official champion until 1956 when full league play began.

The 1954 Brown Bears football team was an American football team that represented Brown University as an independent during the 1954 college football season.

In their fourth season under head coach Alva Kelley, the Bears compiled a 3–5–1 record, but outscored their opponents 225 to 120. E. Pearson was the team captain.

Brown played its home games at Brown Stadium in Providence, Rhode Island.

== Schedule ==
Date	Opponent	Site	Result	Attendance	Source
September 25	Columbia	Brown Stadium; Providence, RI	W 18–7	10,000	
October 2	at Yale	Yale Bowl; New Haven, CT	L 24–26	27,000	
October 9	Rhode Island	Brown Stadium; Providence, RI (rivalry)	W 35–0	15,000	
October 16	Princeton^{†}	Brown Stadium; Providence, RI	W 21–20	15,000	
October 23	Temple	Brown Stadium; Providence, RI	L 14–19	8,000	
October 30	at Lehigh	Taylor Stadium; Bethlehem, PA	W 34–6	6,500	
November 6	Springfield	Brown Stadium; Providence, RI	W 40–7		
November 13	at Harvard	Harvard Stadium; Boston, MA	T 21–21	21,000	
November 25	Colgate	Brown Stadium; Providence, RI	W 18–14	15,000	
^{†}Homecoming
