= 1954 Columbia Lions football team =

American college football season

1954 Columbia Lions football
- Conference: Ivy League
- Record: 1–8 (1–5 Ivy)
- Head coach: Lou Little (25th season)
- Captain: Neil Opdyke
- Home stadium: Baker Field

1954 Ivy League football standings
	Conf.					Overall
Team	W		L		T	W		L		T
Yale	4	–	2	–	0	5	–	3	–	1
Cornell	4	–	2	–	0	5	–	4	–	0
Brown	2	–	1	–	1	6	–	2	–	1
Harvard	3	–	2	–	1	4	–	3	–	1
Princeton	4	–	3	–	0	5	–	3	–	1
Dartmouth	2	–	3	–	0	3	–	6	–	0
Columbia	1	–	5	–	0	1	–	8	–	0
Penn	0	–	2	–	0	0	–	9	–	0
The Ivy League did not crown an official champion until 1956 when full league play began.

The 1954 Columbia Lions football team was an American football team that represented Columbia University as an independent during the 1954 college football season.

In their 25th season under head coach Lou Little, the Lions compiled a 1–8 record, and were outscored 306 to 71. Neil Opdyke was the team captain.

Columbia played its home games at Baker Field in Upper Manhattan, in New York City.

== Schedule ==
Date	Opponent	Site	Result	Attendance	Source
September 25	at Brown	Brown Stadium; Providence, RI	L 7–18	10,000	
October 2	Princeton	Baker Field; New York, NY	L 20–54	18,000	
October 9	Yale	Baker Field; New York, NY	L 7–13	18,000	
October 16	at Harvard	Harvard Stadium; Boston, MA	W 7–6	13,500	
October 23	No. 8 Army^{†}	Baker Field; New York, NY	L 12–67	30,000	
October 30	Cornell	Baker Field; New York, NY (rivalry)	L 0–26	8,500	
November 6	at Dartmouth	Memorial Field; Hanover, NH	L 0–26	9,000	
November 13	at No. 10 Navy	Thompson Stadium; Annapolis, MD	L 6–51	11,000	
November 20	Rutgers	Baker Field; New York, NY	L 12–45	9,000	
^{†}Homecoming; Rankings from AP Poll released prior to the game
