= 1954 Princeton Tigers football team =

American college football season

1954 Princeton Tigers football
- Conference: Ivy League
- Record: 5–3–1 (4–3 Ivy)
- Head coach: Charlie Caldwell (10th season)
- Captain: Jack Henn
- Home stadium: Palmer Stadium

1954 Ivy League football standings
	Conf.					Overall
Team	W		L		T	W		L		T
Yale	4	–	2	–	0	5	–	3	–	1
Cornell	4	–	2	–	0	5	–	4	–	0
Brown	2	–	1	–	1	6	–	2	–	1
Harvard	3	–	2	–	1	4	–	3	–	1
Princeton	4	–	3	–	0	5	–	3	–	1
Dartmouth	2	–	3	–	0	3	–	6	–	0
Columbia	1	–	5	–	0	1	–	8	–	0
Penn	0	–	2	–	0	0	–	9	–	0
The Ivy League did not crown an official champion until 1956 when full league play began.

The 1954 Princeton Tigers football team was an American football team that represented Princeton University during the 1954 college football season. In their tenth year under head coach Charlie Caldwell, the Tigers compiled a 5–3–1 record and outscored opponents 182 to 124. Jack Henn was the team captain.

Princeton played its home games at Palmer Stadium on the university campus in Princeton, New Jersey.

== Schedule ==
Date	Opponent	Site	Result	Attendance	Source
September 25	Rutgers	Palmer Stadium; Princeton, NJ (rivalry)	W 10–8	23,000	
October 2	at Columbia	Baker Field; New York, NY	W 54–20	18,000	
October 9	Penn	Palmer Stadium; Princeton, NJ	W 13–7	35,000	
October 16	at Brown	Brown Stadium; Providence, RI	L 20–21	15,000	
October 23	Cornell	Palmer Stadium; Princeton, NJ	L 0–27	30,000	
October 30	Colgate	Palmer Stadium; Princeton, NJ	T 6–6	23,000	
November 6	Harvard	Palmer Stadium; Princeton, NJ (rivalry)	L 9–14	30,000	
November 13	at Yale	Yale Bowl; New Haven, CT (rivalry)	W 21–14	11,000	
November 20	Dartmouth	Palmer Stadium; Princeton, NJ	W 49–7	23,000	
