= 1954 Harvard Crimson football team =

American college football season

1954 Harvard Crimson football
- Conference: Ivy League
- Record: 4–3–1 (3–2–1 Ivy)
- Head coach: Lloyd Jordan (5th season)
- Captain: J. Timothy Anderson
- Home stadium: Harvard Stadium

1954 Ivy League football standings
	Conf.					Overall
Team	W		L		T	W		L		T
Yale	4	–	2	–	0	5	–	3	–	1
Cornell	4	–	2	–	0	5	–	4	–	0
Brown	2	–	1	–	1	6	–	2	–	1
Harvard	3	–	2	–	1	4	–	3	–	1
Princeton	4	–	3	–	0	5	–	3	–	1
Dartmouth	2	–	3	–	0	3	–	6	–	0
Columbia	1	–	5	–	0	1	–	8	–	0
Penn	0	–	2	–	0	0	–	9	–	0
The Ivy League did not crown an official champion until 1956 when full league play began.

The 1954 Harvard Crimson football team was an American football team that represented Harvard University during the 1954 college football season. In their fifth year under head coach Lloyd Jordan, the Crimson compiled a 4–3–1 record and outscored opponents 108 to 97. J. Timothy Anderson was the team captain.

Harvard played its home games at Harvard Stadium in the Allston neighborhood of Boston, Massachusetts.

== Schedule ==
Date	Opponent	Site	Result	Attendance	Source
October 2	Massachusetts	Harvard Stadium; Boston, MA	L 7–13	15,800	
October 9	at Cornell	Schoellkopf Field; Ithaca, NY	W 13–12	19,000	
October 16	Columbia	Harvard Stadium; Boston, MA	L 6–7	13,500	
October 23	Dartmouth	Harvard Stadium; Boston, MA (rivalry)	L 7–13	32,000	
October 30	Ohio	Harvard Stadium; Boston, MA	W 27–13	6,500	
November 6	at Princeton	Palmer Stadium; Princeton, NJ (rivalry)	W 14–9	30,000	
November 13	Brown	Harvard Stadium; Boston, MA	T 21–21	21,000	
November 20	Yale	Harvard Stadium; Boston, MA (The Game)	W 13–9	40,000	
