= 1954 Auburn Tigers football team =

American college football season

1954 Auburn Tigers football

Gator Bowl champion

Gator Bowl, W 33–13 vs. Baylor
- Conference: Southeastern Conference

Ranking
- AP: No. 13
- Record: 8–3 (3–3 SEC)
- Head coach: Ralph Jordan (4th season)
- Home stadium: Cliff Hare Stadium; Legion Field

1954 Southeastern Conference football standings
	Conf.					Overall
Team	W		L		T	W		L		T
No. 6 Ole Miss $	5	–	1	–	0	9	–	2	–	0
Georgia Tech	6	–	2	–	0	8	–	3	–	0
Florida	5	–	2	–	0	5	–	5	–	0
Kentucky	5	–	2	–	0	7	–	3	–	0
Georgia	3	–	2	–	1	6	–	3	–	1
No. 13 Auburn	3	–	3	–	0	8	–	3	–	0
Mississippi State	3	–	3	–	0	6	–	4	–	0
Alabama	3	–	3	–	2	4	–	5	–	2
LSU	2	–	5	–	0	5	–	6	–	0
Tulane	1	–	6	–	1	1	–	6	–	3
Vanderbilt	1	–	5	–	0	2	–	7	–	0
Tennessee	1	–	5	–	0	4	–	6	–	0
$ – Conference champion; Ole Miss's game against Arkansas counted in the conference standings.; Rankings from AP Poll

The 1954 Auburn Tigers football team represented Auburn University in the 1954 college football season. It was the Tigers' 63rd overall and 22nd season as a member of the Southeastern Conference (SEC). The team was led by head coach Ralph "Shug" Jordan, in his fourth year, and played their home games at Cliff Hare Stadium in Auburn and Legion Field in Birmingham, Alabama. They finished with a record of eight wins and three losses (8–3 overall, 3–3 in the SEC) and with a victory over Baylor in the Gator Bowl.

== Schedule ==
Date	Opponent	Rank	Site	Result	Attendance	Source
September 25	Chattanooga*		Cliff Hare Stadium; Auburn, AL	W 45–0	18,000	
October 2	at No. 20 Florida		Florida Field; Gainesville, FL (rivalry)	L 13–19		
October 9	at Kentucky		McLean Stadium; Lexington, KY	L 14–21		
October 16	at No. 19 Georgia Tech		Grant Field; Atlanta, GA (rivalry)	L 7–14	40,000	
October 23	Florida State*		Cliff Hare Stadium; Auburn, AL	W 33–0	15,000	
October 30	Tulane		Ladd Memorial Stadium; Mobile, AL (rivalry)	W 27–0	13,500	
November 6	No. 6 Miami (FL)*		Legion Field; Birmingham, AL	W 14–13	25,000	
November 13	vs. No. 20 Georgia		Memorial Stadium; Columbus, GA (rivalry)	W 35–0		
November 20	Clemson*^{†}	No. 18	Cliff Hare Stadium; Auburn, AL (rivalry)	W 27–6		
November 27	vs. Alabama	No. 15	Legion Field; Birmingham, AL (Iron Bowl)	W 28–0	43,167	
December 31	vs. No. 18 Baylor*	No. 13	Gator Bowl Stadium; Jacksonville, FL (Gator Bowl)	W 33–13	34,408	
*Non-conference game; ^{†}Homecoming; Rankings from AP Poll released prior to the game
