= 1954 Louisville Cardinals football team =

American college football season

1954 Louisville Cardinals football
- Conference: Independent
- Record: 3–6
- Head coach: Frank Camp (9th season)
- Captain: Johnny Unitas
- Home stadium: Parkway Field

1954 Southern college football independents records
	Conf.			Overall
Team	W	L	T	W		L		T
No. 9 Miami (FL)		–		8	–	1	–	0
Delaware		–		8	–	2	–	0
No. 5 Navy		–		8	–	2	–	0
Tampa		–		8	–	2	–	0
Florida State		–		8	–	4	–	0
Abilene Christian		–		6	–	3	–	1
Chattanooga		–		6	–	4	–	0
Mississippi Southern		–		6	–	4	–	0
Memphis State		–		3	–	4	–	3
Louisville		–		3	–	6	–	0
Arkansas State		–		1	–	8	–	0
Sewanee		–		0	–	8	–	0
Rankings from AP Poll

The 1954 Louisville Cardinals football team was an American football team that represented the University of Louisville as an independent during the 1954 college football season. In their ninth season under head coach Frank Camp, the Cardinals compiled a 3–6 record. Johnny Unitas was the team captain.

== Schedule ==
Date	Opponent	Site	Result	Attendance	Source
September 18	Murray State	Parkway Field; Louisville, KY	L 13–33	1,500	
September 24	at Wayne	Tartar Field; Detroit, MI	L 0–13	653	
October 2	Florida State	Parkway Field; Louisville, KY	L 6–47		
October 9	at Dayton	UD Stadium; Dayton, OH	L 7–27	7,223	
October 16	Evansville	Parkway Field; Louisville, KY	W 26–6	1,000	
October 23	Centre	Parkway Field; Louisville, KY	W 27–6	3,300	
October 30	at Western Kentucky	Western Stadium; Bowling Green, KY	L 7–25		
November 6	Morehead State^{†}	Parkway Field; Louisville, KY	W 24–0	1,600	
November 13	at Eastern Kentucky	Hanger Stadium; Richmond, KY	L 6–20	6,000	
^{†}Homecoming
