= 1954 SMU Mustangs football team =

American college football season

1954 SMU Mustangs football
- Conference: Southwest Conference

Ranking
- Coaches: No. 17
- Record: 6–3–1 (4–1–1 SWC)
- Head coach: Woody Woodard (2nd season)
- Captains: Duane Nutt; Raymond Berry
- Home stadium: Cotton Bowl

1954 Southwest Conference football standings
	Conf.					Overall
Team	W		L		T	W		L		T
No. 10 Arkansas $	5	–	1	–	0	8	–	3	–	0
SMU	4	–	1	–	1	6	–	3	–	1
No. 19 Rice	4	–	2	–	0	7	–	3	–	0
No. 18 Baylor	4	–	2	–	0	7	–	4	–	0
Texas	2	–	3	–	1	4	–	5	–	1
TCU	1	–	5	–	0	4	–	6	–	0
Texas A&M	0	–	6	–	0	1	–	9	–	0
$ – Conference champion; Rankings from AP Poll

The 1954 SMU Mustangs football team represented Southern Methodist University (SMU) as a member of the Southwest Conference (SWC) during the 1954 college football season. Led by second-year head coach Woody Woodard, the Mustangs compiled an overall record of 6–3–1 with a mark of 4–1–1 in conference play, placing second in the SWC. SMU played home games at the Cotton Bowl in Dallas. Duane Nutt and Raymond Berry were the team captains.

== Schedule ==
Date	Opponent	Rank	Site	Result	Attendance	Source
October 2	Georgia Tech*		Cotton Bowl; Dallas, TX	L 7–10	34,504	
October 9	at Missouri*		Memorial Stadium; Columbia, MO	W 25–6	27,500	
October 16	at No. 15 Rice		Rice Stadium; Houston, TX (rivalry)	W 20–6	63,500	
October 23	Kansas*		Cotton Bowl; Dallas, TX	W 36–18	20,037	
October 30	at Texas	No. 18	Memorial Stadium; Austin, TX	T 13–13	50,000	
November 6	Texas A&M		Cotton Bowl; Dallas, TX	W 6–3	44,307	
November 13	at No. 4 Arkansas	No. 19	Razorback Stadium; Fayetteville, AR	W 21–14	25,000	
November 20	No. 20 Baylor	No. 11	Cotton Bowl; Dallas, TX	L 21–33	47,000	
November 27	TCU		Cotton Bowl; Dallas, TX (rivalry)	W 21–6	30,022	
December 4	No. 4 Notre Dame*		Cotton Bowl; Dallas, TX	L 14–26	75,704	
*Non-conference game; Rankings from AP Poll released prior to the game
