= 1954 Mississippi State Maroons football team =

American college football season

1954 Mississippi State Maroons football
- Conference: Southeastern Conference
- Record: 6–4 (3–3 SEC)
- Head coach: Darrell Royal (1st season)
- Home stadium: Scott Field

1954 Southeastern Conference football standings
	Conf.					Overall
Team	W		L		T	W		L		T
No. 6 Ole Miss $	5	–	1	–	0	9	–	2	–	0
Georgia Tech	6	–	2	–	0	8	–	3	–	0
Florida	5	–	2	–	0	5	–	5	–	0
Kentucky	5	–	2	–	0	7	–	3	–	0
Georgia	3	–	2	–	1	6	–	3	–	1
No. 13 Auburn	3	–	3	–	0	8	–	3	–	0
Mississippi State	3	–	3	–	0	6	–	4	–	0
Alabama	3	–	3	–	2	4	–	5	–	2
LSU	2	–	5	–	0	5	–	6	–	0
Tulane	1	–	6	–	1	1	–	6	–	3
Vanderbilt	1	–	5	–	0	2	–	7	–	0
Tennessee	1	–	5	–	0	4	–	6	–	0
$ – Conference champion; Ole Miss's game against Arkansas counted in the conference standings.; Rankings from AP Poll

The 1954 Mississippi State Maroons football team represented Mississippi State College during the 1954 college football season. This was the first season as head coach for Darrell Royal, who had previously served as an assistant for the Maroons. Royal would later win three national championships as head coach of Texas. Center Hal Easterwood was named to the FWAA/Look All-America team. Halfback Art Davis was named SEC "Player of the Year" by the Nashville Banner and Atlanta Constitution.

== Schedule ==
Date	Opponent	Site	Result	Attendance	Source
September 18	Memphis State*	Scott Field; Starkville, MS	W 27–7	9,000	
September 25	vs. Tennessee	Crump Stadium; Memphis, TN	L 7–19	28,523	
October 2	Arkansas State*	Scott Field; Starkville, MS	W 46–13	9,000	
October 9	at Tulane	Tulane Stadium; New Orleans, LA	W 14–0	18,000	
October 15	at Miami (FL)*	Burdine Stadium; Miami, FL	L 13–27	40,836	
October 23	at No. 12 Alabama	Denny Stadium; Tuscaloosa, AL (rivalry)	W 12–7	30,000	
October 30	at Florida	Florida Field; Gainesville, FL	L 0–7		
November 6	North Texas State*	Scott Field; Starkville, MS	W 48–26	10,000	
November 13	at LSU	Tiger Stadium; Baton Rouge, LA (rivalry)	W 25–0	20,000	
November 27	at No. 7 Ole Miss	Hemingway Stadium; Oxford, MS (Egg Bowl)	L 0–14	36,000	
*Non-conference game; Rankings from AP Poll released prior to the game
