= 1954 Gator Bowl =

The 1954 Gator Bowl may refer to:

- 1954 Gator Bowl (January), January 1, 1954, game between the Texas Tech Red Raiders and the Auburn Tigers
- 1954 Gator Bowl (December), December 31, 1954, game between the Auburn Tigers and the Baylor Bears
