= 1954 Alabama Crimson Tide football team =

American college football season

1954 Alabama Crimson Tide football
- Conference: Southeastern Conference
- Record: 4–5–2 (3–3–2 SEC)
- Head coach: Harold Drew (8th season)
- Captain: Sid Youngelman
- Home stadium: Denny Stadium; Legion Field; Ladd Stadium; Cramton Bowl

1954 Southeastern Conference football standings
	Conf.					Overall
Team	W		L		T	W		L		T
No. 6 Ole Miss $	5	–	1	–	0	9	–	2	–	0
Georgia Tech	6	–	2	–	0	8	–	3	–	0
Florida	5	–	2	–	0	5	–	5	–	0
Kentucky	5	–	2	–	0	7	–	3	–	0
Georgia	3	–	2	–	1	6	–	3	–	1
No. 13 Auburn	3	–	3	–	0	8	–	3	–	0
Mississippi State	3	–	3	–	0	6	–	4	–	0
Alabama	3	–	3	–	2	4	–	5	–	2
LSU	2	–	5	–	0	5	–	6	–	0
Tulane	1	–	6	–	1	1	–	6	–	3
Vanderbilt	1	–	5	–	0	2	–	7	–	0
Tennessee	1	–	5	–	0	4	–	6	–	0
$ – Conference champion; Ole Miss's game against Arkansas counted in the conference standings.; Rankings from AP Poll

The 1954 Alabama Crimson Tide football team (variously "Alabama", "UA" or "Bama") represented the University of Alabama in the 1954 college football season. It was the Crimson Tide's 60th overall and 21st season as a member of the Southeastern Conference (SEC). The team was led by head coach Harold Drew, in his eighth year, and played their home games at Denny Stadium in Tuscaloosa, Legion Field in Birmingham, Ladd Stadium in Mobile and at the Cramton Bowl in Montgomery, Alabama. They finished with a record of four wins, five losses and two ties (4–5–2 overall, 3–3–2 in the SEC).

After a second consecutive season-opening loss to Mississippi Southern, Alabama reeled off a four-game winning streak that included shutout victories over LSU, Tulsa and Tennessee. However, the Crimson Tide followed their streak by scoring only 14 points over the final six games of the 1954 season. After their win over Tennessee, Alabama lost to Mississippi State, and in the loss began a streak of 16 consecutive scoreless quarters that tied the all-time school record. Consecutive scoreless ties against Georgia and Tulane followed, despite quarterback Bart Starr's attempted comeback from a brutal pre-season hazing injury. The season ended with losses to Georgia Tech, Miami and Auburn by a combined score of 71–7. Their record of 4–5–2 was only Alabama's second losing season in 50 years.

After the conclusion of the season, on December 2, Harold Drew resigned as head coach of the Crimson Tide. During his tenure as head coach, Drew had a winning record going 54–28–7 in seven years. Drew's teams won one conference title and played in three bowl games in eight years. On the day of Drew's resignation, Jennings B. Whitworth was introduced as his successor as head coach after he served in the same capacity at Oklahoma A&M.

== Schedule ==
Date	Opponent	Rank	Site	TV	Result	Attendance	Source
September 17	Mississippi Southern*	No. 14	Cramton Bowl; Montgomery, AL		L 2–7	21,000	
September 25	at LSU		Tiger Stadium; Baton Rouge, LA (rivalry)		W 12–0	40,000	
October 2	Vanderbilt		Ladd Memorial Stadium; Mobile, AL		W 28–14	25,000	
October 9	Tulsa*		Denny Stadium; Tuscaloosa, AL		W 40–0	17,000	
October 16	at Tennessee		Shields–Watkins Field; Knoxville, TN (Third Saturday in October)		W 27–0	41,800	
October 23	Mississippi State^{†}		Denny Stadium; Tuscaloosa, AL (rivalry)		L 7–12	30,000	
October 30	Georgia		Legion Field; Birmingham, AL (rivalry)		T 0–0	30,000	
November 6	at Tulane		Tulane Stadium; New Orleans, LA		T 0–0	22,000	
November 13	at Georgia Tech		Grant Field; Atlanta, GA (rivalry)	ABC	L 0–20	40,000	
November 19	at No. 16 Miami (FL)*		Burdine Stadium; Miami, FL		L 7–23	61,423	
November 27	vs. No. 15 Auburn		Legion Field; Birmingham, AL (Iron Bowl)		L 0–28	43,167	
*Non-conference game; ^{†}Homecoming; Rankings from AP Poll released prior to the game

== Game summaries ==
=== Mississippi Southern ===
Team	1	2	3	4	Total
• Miss Southern	7	0	0	0	7
#14 Alabama	0	0	0	2	2

- Date: September 17
- Location: Cramton Bowl
  Montgomery, AL
- Game attendance: 21,000

To open the 1954 season, Alabama was upset by the Mississippi Southern Southerners, for the second consecutive year, 7–2 at the Cramton Bowl on a Friday night. The only touchdown of the game was scored by the Golden Eagles in the first quarter on an 18-yard Brooks Tisdale touchdown run. For the remainder of the game, both defenses were dominant with the only points coming in the fourth quarter when Douglas Potts blocked a Southern punt into the end zone for a safety and made the final score 7–2.

=== LSU ===
Team	1	2	3	4	Total
• Alabama	0	6	0	6	12
LSU	0	0	0	0	0

- Date: September 25
- Location: Tiger Stadium
  Baton Rouge, LA
- Game attendance: 40,000

To open conference play for the 1954 season, Alabama defeated LSU 12–0 at Tiger Stadium in Baton Rouge. After a scoreless first quarter, Alabama scored their first touchdown on a 15-yard Bart Starr pass to Thomas Tharp for a 6–0 halftime lead. On the first play of the final period, Hootie Ingram scored on a 69-yard run and made the final score 12–0.

=== Vanderbilt ===
Team	1	2	3	4	Total
Vanderbilt	7	7	0	0	14
• Alabama	0	7	14	7	28

- Date: October 2
- Location: Ladd Stadium
  Mobile, AL
- Game attendance: 25,000

At Ladd Stadium, the Crimson Tide defeated the Vanderbilt Commodores by a final score of 28–14 in Mobile. Vanderbilt took a 7–0 first quarter lead after Charley Horton scored on a five-yard touchdown run. The Crimson Tide responded with a 30-yard Hootie Ingram touchdown pass to Thomas Tharp to tie the game 7–7 in the second quarter. However, the Commodores responded to take a 14–7 halftime lead after 28-yard Horton touchdown run. Early in the third, a blocked Vandy punt gave Alabama possession at the Commodores 16-yard line. Four plays later, William Stone tied the game at 14–14 with his two-yard touchdown run. Alabama then closed with a pair of touchdowns to win the game 28–14. In the third, Albert Elmore threw a seven-yard touchdown pass to Bobby Luna and in the fourth, Tharp scored on a 10-yard run.

=== Tulsa ===
Team	1	2	3	4	Total
Tulsa	0	0	0	0	0
• Alabama	14	12	14	0	40

- Date: October 9
- Location: Denny Stadium
  Tuscaloosa, AL
- Game attendance: 17,000

In the first Denny Stadium game of the season, Alabama shutout the Tulsa Golden Hurricane 40–0 in a contest that saw the Crimson Tide throw five touchdown passes. Alabama took a 14–0 first quarter lead after a 22-yard Hootie Ingram pass to William Hollis and on a 26-yard Ollie Yates pass to Curtis Lynch. Another pair of touchdowns in the second quarter on a four-yard Jerry Watford run and an 18-yard Yates pass to Billy Lumpkin made the halftime score 26–0 in favor of the Crimson Tide. Alabama then closed their scoring with a pair of third-quarter touchdowns on a 17-yard Albert Elmore pass to Paul Donaldson and finally on an 88-yard Elmore pass to Bobby Luna that made the final score 40–0.

=== Tennessee ===
Third Saturday in October

Team	1	2	3	4	Total
• Alabama	0	7	14	6	27
Tennessee	0	0	0	0	0

- Date: October 16
- Location: Shields-Watkins Field
  Knoxville, TN
- Game attendance: 41,800

In their annual rivalry game against the Tennessee, Alabama shutout the Volunteers 27–0 and handed the Vols their worst home loss to date. After a scoreless first quarter, Alabama took a 7–0 halftime lead after Albert Elmore threw an 11-yard touchdown pass to Bobby Luna late in the second quarter. A pair of Elmore touchdown passes in the third quarter, seven-yards to Thomas Tharp and 25-yards to Nicholas Germanos, extended the Crimson Tide lead to 21–0. The final points came late in the fourth quarter when Tharp returned an interception 96-yards for touchdown and the 27–0 victory. The return remained the longest in Alabama history through the 1991 season when Mark McMillian had a 98-yard return against Chattanooga.

=== Mississippi State ===
Team	1	2	3	4	Total
• Mississippi State	0	0	6	6	12
Alabama	0	7	0	0	7

- Date: October 23
- Location: Denny Stadium
  Tuscaloosa, AL
- Game attendance: 30,000

On homecoming in Tuscaloosa, the Crimson Tide were defeated by the Mississippi State Maroons 12–7 at Denny Stadium. After a scoreless first quarter, Alabama took a 7–0 halftime lead when Albert Elmore threw a three-yard touchdown pass to Thomas Tharp with only 0:25 left in the second. The Maroons scored their first touchdown in the third quarter when Bobby Collins returned a Bobby Luna punt 56-yards to cut the Crimson Tide lead to 7–6. State then scored the game-winning touchdown on a 30-yard Joe Silveri run in the fourth and gave the Maroons the 12–7 victory.

=== Georgia ===
Team	1	2	3	4	Total
Georgia	0	0	0	0	0
Alabama	0	0	0	0	0

- Date: October 30
- Location: Legion Field
  Birmingham, AL
- Game attendance: 30,000

At Birmingham, the Crimson Tide battled the Georgia Bulldogs to a scoreless tie in the first Legion Field game of the season.

=== Tulane ===
Team	1	2	3	4	Total
Alabama	0	0	0	0	0
Tulane	0	0	0	0	0

- Date: November 6
- Location: Tulane Stadium
  New Orleans, LA
- Game attendance: 22,000

For their game against Tulane, Alabama traveled to New Orleans and played the Green Wave to a scoreless tie, the second for the Crimson Tide in two weeks.

=== Georgia Tech ===
Team	1	2	3	4	Total
Alabama	0	0	0	0	0
• Georgia Tech	13	0	7	0	20

- Date: November 13
- Location: Grant Field
  Atlanta, GA
- Game attendance: 40,000
- Television network: ABC

Against Georgia Tech, Alabama extended their scoreless streak to 14 quarters before a nationally televised audience against the Yellow Jackets 20–0 at Grant Field. Tech took a commanding 13–0 lead in the first quarter with touchdowns scored on runs of 45-yards by Paul Rotenberry and seven-yards by E. O. Thompson. The Jackets then scored their final points in the third on a six-yard Thompson run for the 20–0 victory.

=== Miami ===
Team	1	2	3	4	Total
Alabama	0	0	7	0	7
• #16 Miami	0	10	0	13	23

- Date: November 19
- Location: Burdine Stadium
  Miami, FL
- Game attendance: 61,423

On a Friday evening in Miami, Alabama was defeated by the Miami Hurricanes 23–7 at Burdine Stadium. After a scoreless first, Miami took a 10–0 halftime lead after Porky Oliver kicked a field goal and on a six-yard Whitey Rouviere touchdown run in the second quarter. The Crimson Tide then ended a 16 quarter shutout streak in the third quarter when Bart Starr scored on a one-yard run and made the score 10–7. The Hurricanes then closed the game with a pair of fourth-quarter touchdowns and won the game 23–7.

=== Auburn ===
Iron Bowl

Team	1	2	3	4	Total
• #15 Auburn	7	0	7	14	28
Alabama	0	0	0	0	0

- Date: November 27
- Location: Legion Field
  Birmingham, AL
- Game attendance: 43,167

For the first time since the 1949 season, Alabama was defeated by the rival Auburn Tigers 28–0 at Legion Field. Auburn led 7–0 at halftime with the only first half touchdown scored on a one-yard Bobby Freeman run in the first quarter. After a 41-yard Freeman run gave the Tigers a 14–0 lead in the third, a pair of fourth-quarter touchdowns gave Auburn the 28–0 victory. The final points came on a one-yard Joe Childress run and a three-yard Freeman run.

== Personnel ==
=== Varsity letter winners ===
Player	Hometown	Position
Jimmy Bowdoin	Elba, Alabama	Halfback
William Brooks	Tuscaloosa, Alabama	Center
Knute Christian	Tuscaloosa, Alabama	Center
Dan Joseph Coyle	Birmingham, Alabama	End
Ed Culpepper	Bradenton, Florida	Tackle
Tom Danner	Tuscaloosa, Alabama	Guard
Paul Donaldson	Florala, Alabama	End
Charles Eckerly	Oak Park, Illinois	Guard
Albert Elmore	Troy, Alabama	Quarterback
James Emmons	Atmore, Alabama	Tackle
Nicholas Germanos	Montgomery, Alabama	End
Marvin Hill	Huntsville, Alabama	Quarterback
William Hollis	Biloxi, Mississippi	Halfback
Hootie Ingram	Tuscaloosa, Alabama	Back
Bobby Irvin	Sulligent, Alabama	Back
Max Kelley	Cullman, Alabama	Fullback
Harry Lee	Birmingham, Alabama	Guard
Bobby Luna	Huntsville, Alabama	Halfback
Curtis Lynch	Wadley, Alabama	End
George Mason	Langdale, Alabama	Tackle
Jefferson Moorer	Evergreen, Alabama	Guard
Douglas Potts	Evergreen, Alabama	Guard
Bart Starr	Montgomery, Alabama	Quarterback
William Stone	Yukon, West Virginia	Fullback
Thomas Tharp	Birmingham, Alabama	Halfback
Tommy Tillman	Haleyville, Alabama	End
Ollie Yates	Hattiesburg, Mississippi	Quarterback
Sid Youngelman	Newark, New Jersey	Tackle

=== Coaching staff ===
Name	Position	Seasons at Alabama	Alma mater
Harold Drew	Head coach	21	Bates (1916)
Butch Avinger	Assistant coach	1	Alabama (1951)
Lew Bostick	Assistant coach	11	Alabama (1939)
Tilden Campbell	Assistant coach	15	Alabama (1935)
Hank Crisp	Assistant coach	27	VPI (1920)
Joe Kilgrow	Assistant coach	11	Alabama (1937)
Malcolm Laney	Assistant coach	11	Alabama (1932)
James Nisbet	Assistant coach	6	Alabama (1937)
