= 1954 Kentucky Wildcats football team =

American college football season

1954 Kentucky Wildcats football
- Conference: Southeastern Conference
- Record: 7–3 (5–2 SEC)
- Head coach: Blanton Collier (1st season)
- Home stadium: McLean Stadium

1954 Southeastern Conference football standings
	Conf.					Overall
Team	W		L		T	W		L		T
No. 6 Ole Miss $	5	–	1	–	0	9	–	2	–	0
Georgia Tech	6	–	2	–	0	8	–	3	–	0
Florida	5	–	2	–	0	5	–	5	–	0
Kentucky	5	–	2	–	0	7	–	3	–	0
Georgia	3	–	2	–	1	6	–	3	–	1
No. 13 Auburn	3	–	3	–	0	8	–	3	–	0
Mississippi State	3	–	3	–	0	6	–	4	–	0
Alabama	3	–	3	–	2	4	–	5	–	2
LSU	2	–	5	–	0	5	–	6	–	0
Tulane	1	–	6	–	1	1	–	6	–	3
Vanderbilt	1	–	5	–	0	2	–	7	–	0
Tennessee	1	–	5	–	0	4	–	6	–	0
$ – Conference champion; Ole Miss's game against Arkansas counted in the conference standings.; Rankings from AP Poll

The 1954 Kentucky Wildcats football team was an American football team that represented the University of Kentucky as a member of the Southeastern Conference (SEC) during the 1954 college football season. In their first year under head coach Blanton Collier, the Wildcats compiled an overall record of 7–3, with a conference record of 5–2, and finished fourth in the SEC.

== Schedule ==
Date	Opponent	Site	Result	Attendance	Source
September 18	No. 3 Maryland*	McLean Stadium; Lexington, KY	L 0–20	36,000	
September 25	at No. 9 Ole Miss	Crump Stadium; Memphis TN	L 9–28	28,545	
October 2	LSU	McLean Stadium; Lexington, KY	W 7–6	33,000	
October 9	Auburn	McLean Stadium; Lexington, KY	W 21–14		
October 16	at Florida	Florida Field; Gainesville, FL (rivalry)	L 7–21	32,000	
October 23	at No. 15 Georgia Tech	Grant Field; Atlanta, GA	W 13–6	34,000	
October 30	Villanova*	McLean Stadium; Lexington, KY	W 28–3	20,000–22,500	
November 6	Vanderbilt	McLean Stadium; Lexington, KY (rivalry)	W 19–7	28,000	
November 13	Memphis State*	McLean Stadium; Lexington, KY	W 33–7	20,000	
November 20	at Tennessee	Shields–Watkins Field; Knoxville, TN (rivalry)	W 14–13	31,800	
*Non-conference game; Rankings from AP Poll released prior to the game

== 1955 NFL draft ==
Player	Position	Round	Pick	NFL club
Bob Hardy	Back	11	129	Philadelphia Eagles
