= 1954 Tennessee Volunteers football team =

American college football season

1954 Tennessee Volunteers football
- Conference: Southeastern Conference
- Record: 4–6 (1–5 SEC)
- Head coach: Harvey Robinson (2nd season)
- Home stadium: Shields–Watkins Field

1954 Southeastern Conference football standings
	Conf.					Overall
Team	W		L		T	W		L		T
No. 6 Ole Miss $	5	–	1	–	0	9	–	2	–	0
Georgia Tech	6	–	2	–	0	8	–	3	–	0
Florida	5	–	2	–	0	5	–	5	–	0
Kentucky	5	–	2	–	0	7	–	3	–	0
Georgia	3	–	2	–	1	6	–	3	–	1
No. 13 Auburn	3	–	3	–	0	8	–	3	–	0
Mississippi State	3	–	3	–	0	6	–	4	–	0
Alabama	3	–	3	–	2	4	–	5	–	2
LSU	2	–	5	–	0	5	–	6	–	0
Tulane	1	–	6	–	1	1	–	6	–	3
Vanderbilt	1	–	5	–	0	2	–	7	–	0
Tennessee	1	–	5	–	0	4	–	6	–	0
$ – Conference champion; Ole Miss's game against Arkansas counted in the conference standings.; Rankings from AP Poll

The 1954 Tennessee Volunteers (variously Tennessee, UT, or the Vols) represented the University of Tennessee in the 1954 college football season. Playing as a member of the Southeastern Conference (SEC), the team was led by head coach Harvey Robinson, in his second year, and played their home games at Shields–Watkins Field in Knoxville, Tennessee. They finished the season with a record of four wins and six losses (4–6 overall, 1–5 in the SEC).

== Schedule ==
Date	Opponent	Site	Result	Attendance	Source
September 25	vs. Mississippi State	Crump Stadium; Memphis, TN	W 19–7	28,523	
October 2	at No. 7 Duke*	Duke Stadium; Durham, NC	L 6–7	30,000	
October 9	Chattanooga*	Shields–Watkins Field; Knoxville, TN	W 20–14		
October 16	Alabama	Shields–Watkins Field; Knoxville, TN (Third Saturday in October)	L 0–27	41,800	
October 23	Dayton*	Shields–Watkins Field; Knoxville, TN	W 14–7	21,000	
October 30	North Carolina*	Shields–Watkins Field; Knoxville, TN	W 26–20		
November 6	at Georgia Tech	Grant Field; Atlanta, GA (rivalry)	L 7–28	40,000	
November 12	Florida^{†}	Shields–Watkins Field; Knoxville, TN (rivalry)	L 0–14	20,000	
November 20	Kentucky	Shields–Watkins Field; Knoxville, TN (rivalry)	L 13–14	31,800	
November 27	at Vanderbilt	Dudley Field; Nashville, TN (rivalry)	L 0–26	27,000	
*Non-conference game; ^{†}Homecoming; Rankings from AP Poll released prior to the game

== Roster ==
- HB #45 Johnny Majors, So.

== Team players drafted into the NFL ==
Player	Position	Round	Pick	NFL club
Darris McCord	Tackle	3	36	Detroit Lions
Ed Nickla	Guard	14	167	Chicago Bears
Pat Oleksiak	Back	18	216	Detroit Lions
Jimmy Wade	Back	20	238	Philadelphia Eagles
Lamar Leachman	Center	30	360	Cleveland Browns
