= 1954 Delaware Fightin' Blue Hens football team =

American college football season

1954 Delaware Fightin' Blue Hens football

Refrigerator Bowl champion

Refrigerator Bowl, W 19–7 vs. Kent State
- Conference: Independent
- Record: 8–2
- Head coach: David M. Nelson (4th season)
- Captain: Dan Ford
- Home stadium: Delaware Stadium

1954 Southern college football independents records
	Conf.			Overall
Team	W	L	T	W		L		T
No. 9 Miami (FL)		–		8	–	1	–	0
Delaware		–		8	–	2	–	0
No. 5 Navy		–		8	–	2	–	0
Tampa		–		8	–	2	–	0
Florida State		–		8	–	4	–	0
Abilene Christian		–		6	–	3	–	1
Chattanooga		–		6	–	4	–	0
Mississippi Southern		–		6	–	4	–	0
Memphis State		–		3	–	4	–	3
Louisville		–		3	–	6	–	0
Arkansas State		–		1	–	8	–	0
Sewanee		–		0	–	8	–	0
Rankings from AP Poll

The 1954 Delaware Fightin' Blue Hens football team was an American football team that represented the University of Delaware as an independent during the 1954 college football season. In its fourth season under head coach David M. Nelson, the team compiled an 8–2 record and outscored opponents by a total of 265 to 81. Dan Ford was the team captain. The team played its home games at Delaware Stadium in Newark, Delaware.

== Schedule ==
Date	Opponent	Site	Result	Attendance	Source
September 25	West Chester	Delaware Stadium; Newark, DE (rivalry)	W 40–6	6,250	
October 2	at Lehigh	Taylor Stadium; Bethlehem, PA (rivalry)	W 21–0	6,500	
October 9	Temple	Delaware Stadium; Newark, DE	W 51–13	6,435	
October 16	at New Hampshire	Cowell Stadium; Durham, NH	W 19–13	9,000	
October 23	Connecticut^{†}	Delaware Stadium; Newark, DE	W 28–7	6,919	
October 30	at Muhlenberg	Muhlenberg Field; Allentown, PA	L 13–14	4,500	
November 6	at Gettysburg	Musselman Stadium; Gettysburg, PA	L 13–14	3,500	
November 13	Lafayette	Delaware Stadium; Newark, DE	W 41–7	4,858	
November 20	Bucknell	Delaware Stadium; Newark, DE	W 20–0	6,256	
December 5	vs. Kent State	Reitz Stadium; Evansville, IN (Refrigerator Bowl)	W 19–7	3,000	
^{†}Homecoming
