= 1954 Chattanooga Moccasins football team =

American college football season

1954 Chattanooga Moccasins football
- Conference: Independent
- Record: 6–4
- Head coach: Scrappy Moore (24th season)
- Captains: Dick Young; Dick Oniskey
- Home stadium: Chamberlain Field

1954 Southern college football independents records
	Conf.			Overall
Team	W	L	T	W		L		T
No. 9 Miami (FL)		–		8	–	1	–	0
Delaware		–		8	–	2	–	0
No. 5 Navy		–		8	–	2	–	0
Tampa		–		8	–	2	–	0
Florida State		–		8	–	4	–	0
Abilene Christian		–		6	–	3	–	1
Chattanooga		–		6	–	4	–	0
Mississippi Southern		–		6	–	4	–	0
Memphis State		–		3	–	4	–	3
Louisville		–		3	–	6	–	0
Arkansas State		–		1	–	8	–	0
Sewanee		–		0	–	8	–	0
Rankings from AP Poll

The 1954 Chattanooga Moccasins football team was an American football team that represented the University of Chattanooga (now known as the University of Tennessee at Chattanooga) during the 1954 college football season. In their 24th year under head coach Scrappy Moore, the team compiled a 6–4 record.

== Schedule ==
Date	Opponent	Site	Result	Attendance	Source
September 17	Jacksonville State	Chamberlain Field; Chattanooga, TN	W 24–0	5,500	
September 25	at Auburn	Cliff Hare Stadium; Auburn, AL	L 0–45	18,000	
October 1	Tampa	Chamberlain Field; Chattanooga, TN	W 28–6		
October 9	at Tennessee	Shields–Watkins Field; Knoxville, TN	L 14–20		
October 15	North Texas State	Chamberlain Field; Chattanooga, TN	W 20–19	7,000	
October 22	East Texas State	Chamberlain Field; Chattanooga, TN	W 41–6	7,000	
October 30	at Mississippi Southern	Faulkner Field; Hattiesburg, MS	L 6–14	10,000	
November 6	at LSU	Tiger Stadium; Baton Rouge, LA	L 19–26	11,000	
November 13	at Xavier	Xavier Stadium; Cincinnati, OH	W 21–14	9,400	
November 25	Dayton	Chamberlain Field; Chattanooga, TN	W 25–14	7,000	
