= 1954 Arkansas State Indians football team =

American college football season

1954 Arkansas State Indians football
- Conference: Independent
- Record: 1–8
- Head coach: Glen Harmeson (1st season)
- Home stadium: Kays Stadium

1954 Southern college football independents records
	Conf.			Overall
Team	W	L	T	W		L		T
No. 9 Miami (FL)		–		8	–	1	–	0
Delaware		–		8	–	2	–	0
No. 5 Navy		–		8	–	2	–	0
Tampa		–		8	–	2	–	0
Florida State		–		8	–	4	–	0
Abilene Christian		–		6	–	3	–	1
Chattanooga		–		6	–	4	–	0
Mississippi Southern		–		6	–	4	–	0
Memphis State		–		3	–	4	–	3
Louisville		–		3	–	6	–	0
Arkansas State		–		1	–	8	–	0
Sewanee		–		0	–	8	–	0
Rankings from AP Poll

The 1954 Arkansas State Indians football team represented Arkansas State College—now known as Arkansas State University—as an independent during the 1954 college football season. Led by first-year head coach Glen Harmeson, the Indians compiled a record of 1–8.

== Schedule ==
Date	Opponent	Site	Result	Attendance	Source
September 25	Lewis (IL)	Kays Stadium; Jonesboro, AR	W 25–7		
October 2	at Mississippi State	Scott Field; Starkville, MS	L 13–46	9,000	
October 9	at Florence State	Municipal Stadium; Florence, AL	L 7–26		
October 16	at Southwestern Louisiana	McNaspy Stadium; Lafayette, LA	L 2–36		
October 23	Southeastern Louisiana	Kays Stadium; Jonesboro, AR	L 0–51		
October 30	at Memphis State	Crump Stadium; Memphis, TN (rivalry)	L 7–26		
November 6	Austin	Kays Stadium; Jonesboro, AR	L 20–61		
November 14	Tennessee Tech	Kays Stadium; Jonesboro, AR	L 0–47		
November 20	at Abilene Christian	Fair Park; Abilene, TX	L 0–53		
