= 1954 Mississippi Southern Southerners football team =

American college football season

1954 Mississippi Southern Southerners football
- Conference: Independent
- Record: 6–4
- Head coach: Thad Vann (6th season)
- Home stadium: Faulkner Field

1954 Southern college football independents records
	Conf.			Overall
Team	W	L	T	W		L		T
No. 9 Miami (FL)		–		8	–	1	–	0
Delaware		–		8	–	2	–	0
No. 5 Navy		–		8	–	2	–	0
Tampa		–		8	–	2	–	0
Florida State		–		8	–	4	–	0
Abilene Christian		–		6	–	3	–	1
Chattanooga		–		6	–	4	–	0
Mississippi Southern		–		6	–	4	–	0
Memphis State		–		3	–	4	–	3
Louisville		–		3	–	6	–	0
Arkansas State		–		1	–	8	–	0
Sewanee		–		0	–	8	–	0
Rankings from AP Poll

The 1954 Mississippi Southern Southerners football team was an American football team that represented Mississippi Southern College (now known as the University of Southern Mississippi) as an independent during the 1954 college football season. In their sixth year under head coach Thad Vann, the team compiled a 6–4 record.

== Schedule ==
Date	Opponent	Site	Result	Attendance	Source
September 17	at No. 14 Alabama	Cramton Bowl; Montgomery, AL	W 7–2	21,000	
September 25	Louisiana Tech	Faulkner Field; Hattiesburg, MS (rivalry)	W 28–0		
October 2	at North Texas State	Fouts Field; Denton, TX	L 7–15	8,000	
October 9	Abilene Christian	Faulkner Field; Hattiesburg, MS	W 23–7	15,000	
October 16	Southeastern Louisiana	Faulkner Field; Hattiesburg, MS	L 7–13		
October 30	Chattanooga^{†}	Faulkner Field; Hattiesburg, MS	W 14–6	10,000	
November 6	at Dayton	UD Stadium; Dayton, OH	L 7–20	7,775	
November 13	Villanova	Ladd Stadium; Mobile, AL	W 27–0	14,617	
November 20	Memphis State	Faulkner Field; Hattiesburg, MS (rivalry)	W 34–21	9,000	
November 27	at Florida State	Doak Campbell Stadium; Tallahassee, FL	L 18–19		
^{†}Homecoming; Rankings from AP Poll released prior to the game
