= 1954 Georgia Bulldogs football team =

American college football season

1954 Georgia Bulldogs football
- Conference: Southeastern Conference
- Record: 6–3–1 (3–2–1 SEC)
- Head coach: Wally Butts (16th season)
- Home stadium: Sanford Stadium

1954 Southeastern Conference football standings
	Conf.					Overall
Team	W		L		T	W		L		T
No. 6 Ole Miss $	5	–	1	–	0	9	–	2	–	0
Georgia Tech	6	–	2	–	0	8	–	3	–	0
Florida	5	–	2	–	0	5	–	5	–	0
Kentucky	5	–	2	–	0	7	–	3	–	0
Georgia	3	–	2	–	1	6	–	3	–	1
No. 13 Auburn	3	–	3	–	0	8	–	3	–	0
Mississippi State	3	–	3	–	0	6	–	4	–	0
Alabama	3	–	3	–	2	4	–	5	–	2
LSU	2	–	5	–	0	5	–	6	–	0
Tulane	1	–	6	–	1	1	–	6	–	3
Vanderbilt	1	–	5	–	0	2	–	7	–	0
Tennessee	1	–	5	–	0	4	–	6	–	0
$ – Conference champion; Ole Miss's game against Arkansas counted in the conference standings.; Rankings from AP Poll

The 1954 Georgia Bulldogs football team was an American football team that represented the University of Georgia as a member of the Southeastern Conference (SEC) during the 1954 college football season. In their 16th year under head coach Wally Butts, the Bulldogs compiled an overall record of 6–3–1, with a conference record of 3–2–1, and finished fifth in the SEC.

== Schedule ==
Date	Opponent	Rank	Site	Result	Attendance	Source
September 18	at Florida State*		Doak Campbell Stadium; Tallahassee, FL	W 14–0	15,000	
September 25	Clemson*		Sanford Stadium; Athens, GA (rivalry)	W 14–7	28,000	
October 2	Texas A&M*		Sanford Stadium; Athens, GA	L 0–6	23,000	
October 9	at North Carolina*		Kenan Memorial Stadium; Chapel Hill, NC	W 21–7	20,000	
October 16	Vanderbilt^{†}		Sanford Stadium; Athens, GA (rivalry)	W 16–14		
October 23	at Tulane		Tulane Stadium; New Orleans, LA	W 7–0	18,000	
October 30	at Alabama		Legion Field; Birmingham, AL (rivalry)	T 0–0	30,000	
November 6	vs. Florida		Gator Bowl Stadium; Jacksonville, FL (rivalry)	W 14–13	39,000	
November 13	vs. Auburn	No. 20	Memorial Stadium; Columbus, GA (rivalry)	L 0–35		
November 27	at Georgia Tech		Sanford Stadium; Athens, GA (rivalry)	L 3–7	50,000	
*Non-conference game; ^{†}Homecoming; Rankings from Coaches' Poll released prior to the game
