= 1954 Memphis State Tigers football team =

American college football season

1954 Memphis State Tigers football
- Conference: Independent
- Record: 3–4–3
- Head coach: Ralph Hatley (8th season)
- Home stadium: Crump Stadium

1954 Southern college football independents records
	Conf.			Overall
Team	W	L	T	W		L		T
No. 9 Miami (FL)		–		8	–	1	–	0
Delaware		–		8	–	2	–	0
No. 5 Navy		–		8	–	2	–	0
Tampa		–		8	–	2	–	0
Florida State		–		8	–	4	–	0
Abilene Christian		–		6	–	3	–	1
Chattanooga		–		6	–	4	–	0
Mississippi Southern		–		6	–	4	–	0
Memphis State		–		3	–	4	–	3
Louisville		–		3	–	6	–	0
Arkansas State		–		1	–	8	–	0
Sewanee		–		0	–	8	–	0
Rankings from AP Poll

The 1954 Memphis State Tigers football team was an American football team that represented Memphis State College (now known as the University of Memphis) as an independent during the 1954 college football season. In their eighth season under head coach Ralph Hatley, Memphis State compiled a 3–4–3 record.

== Schedule ==
Date	Opponent	Site	Result	Attendance	Source
September 18	at Mississippi State	Scott Field; Starkville, MS	L 7–27	9,000	
September 25	at Tulane	Tulane Stadium; New Orleans, LA	T 13–13		
October 2	Abilene Christian	Crump Stadium; Memphis, TN	T 6–6		
October 9	Murray State	Crump Stadium; Memphis, TN	W 34–6		
October 16	at Tennessee Tech	Overhill Field; Cookeville, TN	T 25–25		
October 23	Middle Tennessee	Crump Stadium; Memphis, TN	W 27–7		
October 30	Arkansas State	Crump Stadium; Memphis, TN (rivalry)	W 26–7		
November 6	No. 9 Ole Miss	Crump Stadium; Memphis, TN (rivalry)	L 0–51		
November 13	at Kentucky	McLean Stadium; Lexington, KY	L 7–33	20,000	
November 20	at Mississippi Southern	Faulkner Field; Hattiesburg, MS (rivalry)	L 21–34	9,000	
Rankings from AP Poll released prior to the game
