= 1954 Florida Gators football team =

American college football season

1954 Florida Gators football
- Conference: Southeastern Conference
- Record: 5–5 (5–2 SEC)
- Head coach: Bob Woodruff (5th season)
- Home stadium: Florida Field

1954 Southeastern Conference football standings
	Conf.					Overall
Team	W		L		T	W		L		T
No. 6 Ole Miss $	5	–	1	–	0	9	–	2	–	0
Georgia Tech	6	–	2	–	0	8	–	3	–	0
Florida	5	–	2	–	0	5	–	5	–	0
Kentucky	5	–	2	–	0	7	–	3	–	0
Georgia	3	–	2	–	1	6	–	3	–	1
No. 13 Auburn	3	–	3	–	0	8	–	3	–	0
Mississippi State	3	–	3	–	0	6	–	4	–	0
Alabama	3	–	3	–	2	4	–	5	–	2
LSU	2	–	5	–	0	5	–	6	–	0
Tulane	1	–	6	–	1	1	–	6	–	3
Vanderbilt	1	–	5	–	0	2	–	7	–	0
Tennessee	1	–	5	–	0	4	–	6	–	0
$ – Conference champion; Ole Miss's game against Arkansas counted in the conference standings.; Rankings from AP Poll

The 1954 Florida Gators football team represented the University of Florida during the 1954 college football season. The season was the fifth for Bob Woodruff as the Florida Gators football team's head coach. The Gators' standout players included running back Mal Hammack. The season was one of mixed results for the Gators: their best-ever Southeastern Conference (SEC) win–loss record, balanced by five overall losses. The highlights of the season were five SEC wins over the fifth-ranked Georgia Tech Yellow Jackets (13–12), Auburn Tigers (19–13), Kentucky Wildcats (21–7), Mississippi State Maroons (7–0) and Tennessee Volunteers (14–0). Woodruff's 1954 Florida Gators finished 5–5 overall and 5–2 in the SEC, placing third in the twelve-team conference—their best SEC showing to date.

== Schedule ==
Date	Opponent	Rank	Site	Result	Attendance	Source
September 18	at No. 16 Rice*		Rice Stadium; Houston, TX	L 14–34	44,000	
September 25	at No. 5 Georgia Tech		Grant Field; Atlanta, GA	W 13–12	30,000	
October 2	Auburn	No. 20	Florida Field; Gainesville, FL (rivalry)	W 19–13		
October 9	vs. Clemson*	No. 14	Gator Bowl Stadium; Jacksonville, FL	L 7–14	28,000	
October 16	Kentucky		Florida Field; Gainesville, FL (rivalry)	W 21–7	32,000	
October 23	at LSU	No. 18	Tiger Stadium; Baton Rouge, LA (rivalry)	L 7–20	25,000	
October 30	Mississippi State^{†}		Florida Field; Gainesville, FL	W 7–0		
November 6	vs. Georgia		Gator Bowl Stadium; Jacksonville, FL (rivalry)	L 13–14	39,000	
November 13	at Tennessee		Shields–Watkins Field; Knoxville, TN (rivalry)	W 14–0	20,000	
November 27	No. 11 Miami (FL)*		Florida Field; Gainesville, FL (rivalry)	L 0–14	38,000	
*Non-conference game; ^{†}Homecoming; Rankings from AP Poll released prior to the game
