= 1954 Florida State Seminoles football team =

American college football season

1954 Florida State Seminoles football

Sun Bowl, L 20–47 vs. Texas Western
- Conference: Independent
- Record: 8–4
- Head coach: Tom Nugent (2nd season)
- Captain: Game captains
- Home stadium: Doak Campbell Stadium

1954 Southern college football independents records
	Conf.			Overall
Team	W	L	T	W		L		T
No. 9 Miami (FL)		–		8	–	1	–	0
Delaware		–		8	–	2	–	0
No. 5 Navy		–		8	–	2	–	0
Tampa		–		8	–	2	–	0
Florida State		–		8	–	4	–	0
Abilene Christian		–		6	–	3	–	1
Chattanooga		–		6	–	4	–	0
Mississippi Southern		–		6	–	4	–	0
Memphis State		–		3	–	4	–	3
Louisville		–		3	–	6	–	0
Arkansas State		–		1	–	8	–	0
Sewanee		–		0	–	8	–	0
Rankings from AP Poll

The 1954 Florida State Seminoles football team represented Florida State University as an independent during the 1954 college football season. Led by second-year head coach Tom Nugent, the Seminoles compiled a record of 8–4. Florida State was invited to the Sun Bowl, where they lost to Texas Western.

== Schedule ==
Date	Opponent	Site	Result	Attendance	Source
September 18	Georgia	Doak Campbell Stadium; Tallahassee, FL	L 0–14	15,000	
September 25	Abilene Christian	Doak Campbell Stadium; Tallahassee, FL	L 0–13	7,000	
October 2	at Louisville	Parkway Field; Louisville, KY	W 47–6		
October 9	Villanova	Doak Campbell Stadium; Tallahassee, FL	W 52–13		
October 16	at NC State	Riddick Stadium; Raleigh, NC	W 13–7	20,000	
October 23	at Auburn	Cliff Hare Stadium; Auburn, AL	L 0–33	15,000	
October 30	vs. VMI	City Stadium; Lynchburg, VA	W 33–19	7,000	
November 13	Furman^{†}	Doak Campbell Stadium; Tallahassee, FL	W 33–14	14,112	
November 20	at Stetson	DeLand Municipal Stadium; DeLand, FL	W 47–6	4,200	
November 27	Mississippi Southern	Doak Campbell Stadium; Tallahassee, FL	W 19–18		
December 4	at Tampa	Phillips Field; Tampa, FL	W 13–0	11,000	
January 1, 1955	vs. Texas Western	Kidd Field; El Paso, TX (Sun Bowl)	L 20–47	14,000	
^{†}Homecoming
