= 1954 Tulane Green Wave football team =

American college football season

1954 Tulane Green Wave football
- Conference: Southeastern Conference
- Record: 1–6–3 (1–6–1 SEC)
- Head coach: Andy Pilney (1st season)
- Home stadium: Tulane Stadium

1954 Southeastern Conference football standings
	Conf.					Overall
Team	W		L		T	W		L		T
No. 6 Ole Miss $	5	–	1	–	0	9	–	2	–	0
Georgia Tech	6	–	2	–	0	8	–	3	–	0
Florida	5	–	2	–	0	5	–	5	–	0
Kentucky	5	–	2	–	0	7	–	3	–	0
Georgia	3	–	2	–	1	6	–	3	–	1
No. 13 Auburn	3	–	3	–	0	8	–	3	–	0
Mississippi State	3	–	3	–	0	6	–	4	–	0
Alabama	3	–	3	–	2	4	–	5	–	2
LSU	2	–	5	–	0	5	–	6	–	0
Tulane	1	–	6	–	1	1	–	6	–	3
Vanderbilt	1	–	5	–	0	2	–	7	–	0
Tennessee	1	–	5	–	0	4	–	6	–	0
$ – Conference champion; Ole Miss's game against Arkansas counted in the conference standings.; Rankings from AP Poll

The 1954 Tulane Green Wave football team was an American football team that represented Tulane University during the 1954 college football season as a member of the Southeastern Conference (SEC). In its first year under head coach Andy Pilney, Tulane compiled a 1–6–3 record (1–6–1 in conference games), finished in tenth place in the SEC, and was outscored by a total of 144 to 46.

The Green Wave played its home games at Tulane Stadium in New Orleans.

== Schedule ==
Date	Opponent	Site	Result	Attendance	Source
September 18	at No. 7 Georgia Tech	Grant Field; Atlanta, GA	L 0–28	28,000	
September 25	Memphis State*	Tulane Stadium; New Orleans, LA	T 13–13		
October 2	North Carolina*	Tulane Stadium; New Orleans, LA	T 7–7	15,000	
October 9	Mississippi State	Tulane Stadium; New Orleans, LA	L 0–14	18,000	
October 16	at No. 7 Ole Miss	Hemingway Stadium; Oxford, MS (rivalry)	L 7–34	23,500	
October 23	Georgia	Tulane Stadium; New Orleans, LA	L 0–7	18,000	
October 30	vs. Auburn	Ladd Memorial Stadium; Mobile, AL (rivalry)	L 0–27	13,500	
November 6	Alabama	Tulane Stadium; New Orleans, LA	T 0–0	22,000	
November 13	at Vanderbilt	Dudley Field; Nashville, TN	W 6–0	15,000	
November 27	LSU	Tulane Stadium; New Orleans, LA (Battle for the Rag)	L 13–14		
*Non-conference game; Rankings from AP Poll released prior to the game
