= 1954 Vanderbilt Commodores football team =

American college football season

1954 Vanderbilt Commodores football
- Conference: Southeastern Conference
- Record: 2–7 (1–5 SEC)
- Head coach: Art Guepe (2nd season)
- Captains: Pete Williams; John Hall
- Home stadium: Dudley Field

1954 Southeastern Conference football standings
	Conf.					Overall
Team	W		L		T	W		L		T
No. 6 Ole Miss $	5	–	1	–	0	9	–	2	–	0
Georgia Tech	6	–	2	–	0	8	–	3	–	0
Florida	5	–	2	–	0	5	–	5	–	0
Kentucky	5	–	2	–	0	7	–	3	–	0
Georgia	3	–	2	–	1	6	–	3	–	1
No. 13 Auburn	3	–	3	–	0	8	–	3	–	0
Mississippi State	3	–	3	–	0	6	–	4	–	0
Alabama	3	–	3	–	2	4	–	5	–	2
LSU	2	–	5	–	0	5	–	6	–	0
Tulane	1	–	6	–	1	1	–	6	–	3
Vanderbilt	1	–	5	–	0	2	–	7	–	0
Tennessee	1	–	5	–	0	4	–	6	–	0
$ – Conference champion; Ole Miss's game against Arkansas counted in the conference standings.; Rankings from AP Poll

The 1954 Vanderbilt Commodores football team represented Vanderbilt University during the 1954 college football season. The team's head coach was Art Guepe, who was in his second year as the Commodores' head coach. Members of the Southeastern Conference, the Commodores played their home games at Dudley Field in Nashville, Tennessee. In 1954, Vanderbilt went 2–7 overall with a conference record of 1–5.

== Schedule ==
Date	Opponent	Site	Result	Attendance	Source
September 25	Baylor*	Dudley Field; Nashville, TN	L 19–25	22,500	
October 2	at Alabama	Ladd Memorial Stadium; Mobile, AL	L 14–28	26,000	
October 9	No. 7 Ole Miss	Dudley Field; Nashville, TN (rivalry)	L 7–22	26,000	
October 16	at Georgia	Sanford Stadium; Athens, GA (rivalry)	L 14–16		
October 30	at Rice*	Rice Stadium; Houston, TX	L 13–34	28,000	
November 6	at Kentucky	McLean Stadium; Lexington, KY (rivalry)	L 7–19	28,000	
November 14	Tulane	Dudley Field; Nashville, TN	L 0–6	15,000	
November 20	Villanova*	Dudley Field; Nashville, TN	W 34–19	12,000–12,500	
November 27	Tennessee	Dudley Field; Nashville, TN (rivalry)	W 26–0	27,000	
*Non-conference game; Rankings from AP Poll released prior to the game
