= George Sauer =

American football player, coach (1910–1994)

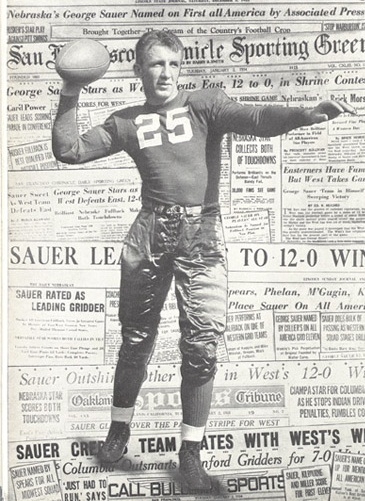
- Sauer from 1934 Cornhusker

Biographical details
- Born: December 11, 1910; Stratton, Nebraska
- Died: February 5, 1994 (aged 83); Waco, Texas
- Education: University of Nebraska

Playing career
- 1931–1933: Nebraska
- 1935–1937: Green Bay Packers
- 1942: Pensacola NAS
- Position: Halfback

Coaching career (HC unless noted)

Football
- 1937–1941: New Hampshire
- 1946–1947: Kansas
- 1948–1949: Navy
- 1950–1955: Baylor

Basketball
- 1938–1939: New Hampshire

Administrative career (AD unless noted)
- 1950–1958: Baylor
- 1961: New York Titans (GM)
- 1962–1969: New York Titans/Jets (dir. pro pers.)
- 1969–1970: Boston Patriots (GM)

Head coaching record
- Overall: 78–55–9 (football); 3–14 (basketball)
- Bowls: 0–3

Accomplishments and honors

Championships
- 2 New England Conference (1937, 1940); 2 Big Six (1946–1947); AFL champion (1968); Super Bowl champion (III); NFL champion (1936)

Awards
- Consensus All-American (1933); 3× First-team All-Big Six (1931, 1932, 1933)
- College Football Hall of Fame; Inducted in 1954 (profile)

George Henry Sauer Sr. (December 11, 1910 – February 5, 1994) was an American football player, coach, college sports administrator, and professional football executive.

== Career ==
Sauer attended the University of Nebraska where he was an All-American halfback under Dana X. Bible from 1931 to 1933. After college, he played for the Green Bay Packers of the National Football League (NFL) from 1935 to 1937, helping them win the 1936 NFL championship as their starting left halfback. Sauer left professional football in 1937 and coached at the University of New Hampshire from 1937 to 1941, compiling a record of 22–18–1. He left his coaching position and enlisted in the U.S. Navy in 1942 and was commissioned as an officer after completing the requisite training. After he completed his military service, he coached for two years at University of Kansas, he compiled a 15–3–2 (.786) record, winning the conference title in each season. After he left Kansas, Sauer coached at the United States Naval Academy (1948–1949), and Baylor University (1950–1955), compiling a career college football record of 78–55–9 and earning trips to both the Orange Bowl and the Gator Bowl. Sauer remained at Baylor as athletic director until 1960 when he became the first General Manager of the New York Titans of the American Football League. The Titans later reorganized and in 1963 were renamed in as the New York Jets. As director of player personnel, Sauer drafted and signed his own son, George Sauer Jr. as a wide receiver. Sauer remained with the Jets until 1969 when he was named general manager of the Boston Patriots.

Sauer appeared as an imposter on the February 26, 1962, episode of the game show To Tell The Truth.

== Death and legacy ==
Sauer died in 1994 after a 10-year battle with Alzheimer's disease. At the time of his death, he was survived by his wife Lillian; son, George Sauer Jr.; and daughter, Dana.

Sauer was inducted into the College Football Hall of Fame as a player in 1954 and in 1998 was inducted into the University of New Hampshire Wildcats' Hall of Fame.

== Head coaching record ==
=== Football ===
Year	Team	Overall	Conference	Standing	Bowl/playoffs	Coaches^{#}	AP^{°}
New Hampshire Wildcats (New England Conference) (1937–1941)
1937	New Hampshire	7–1	1–0	T–1st			
1938	New Hampshire	3–6	1–1	3rd			
1939	New Hampshire	3–5	1–1	T–2nd			
1940	New Hampshire	5–3	2–0	1st			
1941	New Hampshire	4–3–1	0–0–1	3rd			
New Hampshire:		22–18–1	5–2–1				
Kansas Jayhawks (Big Six Conference) (1946–1947)
1946	Kansas	7–2–1	4–1	T–1st			
1947	Kansas	8–1–2	4–0–1	T–1st	L Orange		12
Kansas:		15–3–3	8–1–1				
Navy Midshipmen (Independent) (1948–1949)
1948	Navy	0–8–1					
1949	Navy	3–5–1					
Navy:		3–13–2					
Baylor Bears (Southwest Conference) (1950–1955)
1950	Baylor	7–3	4–2	2nd		15	
1951	Baylor	8–2–1	4–1–1	2nd	L Orange	9	9
1952	Baylor	4–4–2	1–3–2	5th			
1953	Baylor	7–3	4–2	3rd			
1954	Baylor	7–4	4–2	T–3rd	L Gator		18
1955	Baylor	5–5	2–4	T–5th			
Baylor:		38–21–3	19–14–3				
Total:		78–55–9					
National championship Conference title Conference division title or championship game berth
