= 1954 Tampa Spartans football team =

American college football season

1954 Tampa Spartans football

Cigar Bowl champion

Cigar Bowl, W 21–0 vs. Morris Harvey
- Conference: Independent
- Record: 8–2
- Head coach: Marcelino Huerta (3rd season)
- Home stadium: Phillips Field

1954 Southern college football independents records
	Conf.			Overall
Team	W	L	T	W		L		T
No. 9 Miami (FL)		–		8	–	1	–	0
Delaware		–		8	–	2	–	0
No. 5 Navy		–		8	–	2	–	0
Tampa		–		8	–	2	–	0
Florida State		–		8	–	4	–	0
Abilene Christian		–		6	–	3	–	1
Chattanooga		–		6	–	4	–	0
Mississippi Southern		–		6	–	4	–	0
Memphis State		–		3	–	4	–	3
Louisville		–		3	–	6	–	0
Arkansas State		–		1	–	8	–	0
Sewanee		–		0	–	8	–	0
Rankings from AP Poll

The 1954 Tampa Spartans football team represented the University of Tampa in the 1954 college football season. It was the Spartans' 18th season. The team was led by head coach Marcelino Huerta, in his third year, and played their home games at Phillips Field in Tampa, Florida. They finished with a record of eight wins and two losses (8–2) and with a victory in the Cigar Bowl over Charleston (WV).

== Schedule ==
Date	Opponent	Site	Result	Attendance	Source
September 19	at Mexico City College	Estadio Olímpico Universitario; Mexico City, Mexico	W 31–26		
October 1	at Chattanooga	Chamberlain Field; Chattanooga, TN	L 6–28		
October 9	South Georgia	Phillips Field; Tampa, FL	W 67–7		
October 15	Stetson	Phillips Field; Tampa, FL	W 64–9		
October 22	Troy State	Phillips Field; Tampa, FL	W 26–0		
November 6	East Carolina	Phillips Field; Tampa, FL	W 27–14		
November 13	Livingston State	Phillips Field; Tampa, FL	W 38–7		
November 20	Appalachian State^{†}	Phillips Field; Tampa, FL	W 25–20	8,500	
December 4	Florida State	Phillips Field; Tampa, FL	L 0–13	11,000	
December 17	Morris Harvey	Phillips Field; Tampa, FL (Cigar Bowl)	W 21–0	6,500	
^{†}Homecoming
