= 1954 Baylor Bears football team =

American college football season

1954 Baylor Bears football

Gator Bowl, L 13–33 vs. Auburn
- Conference: Southwest Conference

Ranking
- AP: No. 18
- Record: 7–4 (4–2 SWC)
- Head coach: George Sauer (5th season)
- Captains: Jim Ray Smith; Charles Smith
- Home stadium: Baylor Stadium

1954 Southwest Conference football standings
	Conf.					Overall
Team	W		L		T	W		L		T
No. 10 Arkansas $	5	–	1	–	0	8	–	3	–	0
SMU	4	–	1	–	1	6	–	3	–	1
No. 19 Rice	4	–	2	–	0	7	–	3	–	0
No. 18 Baylor	4	–	2	–	0	7	–	4	–	0
Texas	2	–	3	–	1	4	–	5	–	1
TCU	1	–	5	–	0	4	–	6	–	0
Texas A&M	0	–	6	–	0	1	–	9	–	0
$ – Conference champion; Rankings from AP Poll

The 1954 Baylor Bears football team represented Baylor University as a member of the Southwest Conference (SWC) during the 1954 college football season. Led by fifth-year head coach George Sauer, the Bears compiled an overall record of 7–4 with a mark of 4–2 in conference play, tying for third place the SWC. Baylor was invited to the Gator Bowl, where the Bears lost to Auburn. The team played home games at Baylor Stadium in Waco, Texas.

Halfback L. G. Dupre and tackle Jim Ray Smith played in the North–South All-Star Game. Smith, quarterback Billy Hooper, halfback Del Shofner and end Hank Gremminger were selected to the All-Southwest Conference team.

== Schedule ==
Date	Opponent	Rank	Site	Result	Attendance	Source
September 18	Houston*		Baylor Stadium; Waco, TX (rivalry)	W 53–13	22,000	
September 25	at Vanderbilt*	No. 10	Dudley Field; Nashville, TN	W 25–19	22,500	
October 1	at Miami (FL)*	No. 11	Burdine Stadium; Miami, FL	L 13–19	35,063–35,600	
October 9	at Arkansas		Razorback Stadium; Fayetteville, AR	L 20–21	18,000	
October 16	Washington*		Baylor Stadium; Waco, TX	W 34–7	22,000	
October 23	Texas A&M^{†}		Baylor Stadium; Waco, TX (rivalry)	W 20–7	34,000	
October 30	at No. 17 TCU		Amon G. Carter Stadium; Fort Worth, TX (rivalry)	W 12–7	32,000	
November 6	Texas	No. 20	Baylor Stadium; Waco, TX (rivalry)	W 13–7	31,000–32,000	
November 20	at No. 11 SMU	No. 20	Cotton Bowl; Dallas, TX	W 33–21	47,000	
November 27	Rice	No. 9	Baylor Stadium; Waco, TX	L 14–20	24,000	
December 31	vs. Auburn*	No. 18	Gator Bowl Stadium; Jacksonville, FL (Gator Bowl)	L 13–33	34,408	
*Non-conference game; ^{†}Homecoming; Rankings from AP Poll released prior to the game
