= 1954 Miami Hurricanes football team =

American college football season

1954 Miami Hurricanes football
- Conference: Independent

Ranking
- Coaches: No. 9
- AP: No. 11
- Record: 8–1
- Head coach: Andy Gustafson (7th season)
- Home stadium: Burdine Stadium

1954 Southern college football independents records
	Conf.			Overall
Team	W	L	T	W		L		T
No. 9 Miami (FL)		–		8	–	1	–	0
Delaware		–		8	–	2	–	0
No. 5 Navy		–		8	–	2	–	0
Tampa		–		8	–	2	–	0
Florida State		–		8	–	4	–	0
Abilene Christian		–		6	–	3	–	1
Chattanooga		–		6	–	4	–	0
Mississippi Southern		–		6	–	4	–	0
Memphis State		–		3	–	4	–	3
Louisville		–		3	–	6	–	0
Arkansas State		–		1	–	8	–	0
Sewanee		–		0	–	8	–	0
Rankings from AP Poll

The 1954 Miami Hurricanes football team represented the University of Miami as an independent during the 1954 college football season. Led by seventh-year head coach Andy Gustafson, the Hurricanes played their home games at Burdine Stadium in Miami, Florida. Miami finished the season 8–1.

== Schedule ==
Date	Opponent	Rank	Site	Result	Attendance	Source
September 24	Furman		Burdine Stadium; Miami, FL	W 51–13	41,827	
October 1	No. 11 Baylor		Burdine Stadium; Miami, FL	W 19–13	35,063–35,600	
October 8	Holy Cross		Burdine Stadium; Miami, FL	W 26–20	32,856	
October 15	Mississippi State		Burdine Stadium; Miami, FL	W 27–13	40,836	
October 22	Maryland	No. 16	Burdine Stadium; Miami, FL	W 9–7	52,506	
October 29	Fordham	No. 10	Burdine Stadium; Miami, FL	W 75–7	37,498	
November 6	at Auburn	No. 6	Legion Field; Birmingham, AL	L 13–14	25,000	
November 19	Alabama	No. 16	Burdine Stadium; Miami, FL	W 23–7	61,423	
November 27	at Florida	No. 11	Florida Field; Gainesville, FL (rivalry)	W 14–0	38,000	
Rankings from AP Poll released prior to the game
