= 1954 Ole Miss Rebels football team =

American college football season

1954 Ole Miss Rebels football

SEC champion

Sugar Bowl, L 0–21 vs. Navy
- Conference: Southeastern Conference

Ranking
- Coaches: No. 6
- AP: No. 6
- Record: 9–2 (5–1 SEC)
- Head coach: Johnny Vaught (8th season)
- Captains: Jimmy Patton; Allen "Red" Muirhead
- Home stadium: Hemingway Stadium, Crump Stadium

1954 Southeastern Conference football standings
	Conf.					Overall
Team	W		L		T	W		L		T
No. 6 Ole Miss $	5	–	1	–	0	9	–	2	–	0
Georgia Tech	6	–	2	–	0	8	–	3	–	0
Florida	5	–	2	–	0	5	–	5	–	0
Kentucky	5	–	2	–	0	7	–	3	–	0
Georgia	3	–	2	–	1	6	–	3	–	1
No. 13 Auburn	3	–	3	–	0	8	–	3	–	0
Mississippi State	3	–	3	–	0	6	–	4	–	0
Alabama	3	–	3	–	2	4	–	5	–	2
LSU	2	–	5	–	0	5	–	6	–	0
Tulane	1	–	6	–	1	1	–	6	–	3
Vanderbilt	1	–	5	–	0	2	–	7	–	0
Tennessee	1	–	5	–	0	4	–	6	–	0
$ – Conference champion; Ole Miss's game against Arkansas counted in the conference standings.; Rankings from AP Poll

The 1954 Ole Miss Rebels football team represented the University of Mississippi as a member of the Southeastern Conference (SEC) during the 1954 college football season. Led by eighth-year head coach Johnny Vaught, the Rebels compiled an overall record of 9–2 with a mark of 5–1 in conference play, winning the SEC title. Ole Miss was ranked sixth in both major polls at end of the regular season. The Rebels were invited to the Sugar Bowl, where they lost to Navy. The team played home games at Hemingway Stadium in Oxford, Mississippi and Crump Stadium in Memphis, Tennessee.

== Schedule ==
Date	Opponent	Rank	Site	Result	Attendance	Source
September 17	North Texas State*	No. 10	Crump Stadium; Memphis, TN	W 35–12	6,418	
September 25	Kentucky	No. 9	Crump Stadium; Memphis, TN	W 28–9	28,545	
October 2	at Villanova*	No. 8	Philadelphia Municipal Stadium; Philadelphia, PA	W 52–0	95,607	
October 9	at Vanderbilt	No. 7	Dudley Field; Nashville, TN (rivalry)	W 22–7	26,000	
October 16	Tulane	No. 7	Hemingway Stadium; Oxford, MS (rivalry)	W 34–7	23,500	
October 23	at No. 7 Arkansas (Note: Ole Miss's game against Arkansas counted in the SEC standings.)	No. 5	War Memorial Stadium; Little Rock, AR (rivalry)	L 0–6	38,000	
October 30	at LSU	No. 12	Tiger Stadium; Baton Rouge, LA (rivalry)	W 21–6		
November 6	at Memphis State*	No. 9	Crump Stadium; Memphis, TN (rivalry)	W 51–0		
November 13	at Houston*	No. 7	Rice Stadium; Houston, TX	W 26–0	23,000	
November 27	Mississippi State	No. 7	Hemingway Stadium; Oxford, MS (Egg Bowl)	W 14–0	36,000	
January 1	vs. No. 5 Navy*	No. 6	Tulane Stadium; New Orleans, LA (Sugar Bowl)	L 0–21	80,190	
*Non-conference game; Rankings from AP Poll released prior to the game

== Roster ==
- OT Rex Reed Bogan
- FB Paige Cothren
- QB Eagle Day Jr.
- FB Billy Kinard
- Bobby McCool
- DB Jimmy Patton
