= 1954 TCU Horned Frogs football team =

American college football season

1954 TCU Horned Frogs football
- Conference: Southwest Conference
- Record: 4–6 (1–5 SWC)
- Head coach: Abe Martin (2nd season)
- Offensive scheme: Meyer spread
- Home stadium: Amon G. Carter Stadium

1954 Southwest Conference football standings
	Conf.					Overall
Team	W		L		T	W		L		T
No. 10 Arkansas $	5	–	1	–	0	8	–	3	–	0
SMU	4	–	1	–	1	6	–	3	–	1
No. 19 Rice	4	–	2	–	0	7	–	3	–	0
No. 18 Baylor	4	–	2	–	0	7	–	4	–	0
Texas	2	–	3	–	1	4	–	5	–	1
TCU	1	–	5	–	0	4	–	6	–	0
Texas A&M	0	–	6	–	0	1	–	9	–	0
$ – Conference champion; Rankings from AP Poll

The 1954 TCU Horned Frogs football team represented Texas Christian University (TCU) in the 1954 college football season. The Horned Frogs finished the season 4–6 overall and 1–5 in the Southwest Conference. The team was coached by Abe Martin in his second year as head coach. The Frogs played their home games in Amon G. Carter Stadium, which is located on campus in Fort Worth, Texas.

== Schedule ==
Date	Opponent	Rank	Site	Result	Attendance	Source
September 18	at Kansas*		Memorial Stadium; Lawrence, KS	W 27–6	20,000	
September 25	at No. 1 Oklahoma*	No. 20	Oklahoma Memorial Stadium; Norman, OK	L 16–21	50,878	
October 2	Arkansas		Amon G. Carter Stadium; Fort Worth, TX	L 13–20	25,000	
October 8	at No. 9 USC*		Los Angeles Memorial Coliseum; Los Angeles, CA	W 20–7	52,705	
October 16	at Texas A&M		Kyle Field; College Station, TX (rivalry)	W 21–20	15,000	
October 23	Penn State*	No. 20	Amon G. Carter Stadium; Fort Worth, TX	W 20–7	15,000	
October 30	Baylor	No. 17	Amon G. Carter Stadium; Fort Worth, TX (rivalry)	L 7–12	32,000	
November 13	Texas		Amon G. Carter Stadium; Fort Worth, TX (rivalry)	L 34–35	37,000	
November 20	at Rice		Rice Stadium; Houston, TX	L 0–6	32,000	
November 27	at SMU		Cotton Bowl; Dallas, TX (rivalry)	L 6–21	30,022	
*Non-conference game; Rankings from AP Poll released prior to the game
