= 1954 Texas A&M Aggies football team =

American college football season

1954 Texas A&M Aggies football
- Conference: Southwest Conference
- Record: 1–9 (0–6 SWC)
- Head coach: Bear Bryant (1st season)
- Home stadium: Kyle Field

1954 Southwest Conference football standings
	Conf.					Overall
Team	W		L		T	W		L		T
No. 10 Arkansas $	5	–	1	–	0	8	–	3	–	0
SMU	4	–	1	–	1	6	–	3	–	1
No. 19 Rice	4	–	2	–	0	7	–	3	–	0
No. 18 Baylor	4	–	2	–	0	7	–	4	–	0
Texas	2	–	3	–	1	4	–	5	–	1
TCU	1	–	5	–	0	4	–	6	–	0
Texas A&M	0	–	6	–	0	1	–	9	–	0
$ – Conference champion; Rankings from AP Poll

The 1954 Texas A&M Aggies football team represented Texas A&M University in the 1954 college football season as a member of the Southwest Conference (SWC). The Aggies were led by head coach Bear Bryant in his first season and finished with a record of one win and nine losses (1–9 overall, 0–6 in the SWC). This squad became known as the Junction Boys.

== Schedule ==
Date	Opponent	Site	Result	Attendance	Source
September 18	No. 19 Texas Tech*	Kyle Field; College Station, TX (rivalry)	L 9–41	16,500	
September 25	vs. Oklahoma A&M*	Cotton Bowl; Dallas, TX	L 6–14	14,000	
October 2	at Georgia*	Sanford Stadium; Athens, GA	W 6–0	23,000	
October 9	at Houston*	Rice Stadium; Houston, TX	L 7–10	42,000	
October 16	TCU	Kyle Field; College Station, TX (rivalry)	L 20–21	15,000	
October 23	at Baylor	Baylor Stadium; Waco, TX (rivalry)	L 7–20	34,000	
October 30	No. 4 Arkansas	Kyle Field; College Station, TX (rivalry)	L 7–14		
November 6	at SMU	Cotton Bowl; Dallas, TX	L 3–6	44,307	
November 13	Rice	Kyle Field; College Station, TX	L 19–29	25,000	
November 25	at Texas	Memorial Stadium; Austin, TX (rivalry)	L 13–22	58,000	
*Non-conference game; Rankings from AP Poll released prior to the game
