= 1954 Rice Owls football team =

American college football season

1954 Rice Owls football
- Conference: Southwest Conference

Ranking
- Coaches: No. 19
- AP: No. 19
- Record: 7–3 (4–2 SWC)
- Head coach: Jess Neely (15th season)
- Home stadium: Rice Stadium

1954 Southwest Conference football standings
| | Conf. | | | | | Overall |
| Team | W | | L | | T | W | | L | | T |
|---|---|---|---|---|---|---|---|---|---|---|
| No. 10 Arkansas $ | 5 | – | 1 | – | 0 | 8 | – | 3 | – | 0 |
| SMU | 4 | – | 1 | – | 1 | 6 | – | 3 | – | 1 |
| No. 19 Rice | 4 | – | 2 | – | 0 | 7 | – | 3 | – | 0 |
| No. 18 Baylor | 4 | – | 2 | – | 0 | 7 | – | 4 | – | 0 |
| Texas | 2 | – | 3 | – | 1 | 4 | – | 5 | – | 1 |
| TCU | 1 | – | 5 | – | 0 | 4 | – | 6 | – | 0 |
| Texas A&M | 0 | – | 6 | – | 0 | 1 | – | 9 | – | 0 |
$ – Conference champion; Rankings from AP Poll

The 1954 Rice Owls football team represented Rice Institute during the 1954 college football season. The Owls were led by 15th-year head coach Jess Neely and played their home games at Rice Stadium in Houston, Texas. They competed as members of the Southwest Conference, finishing tied for third. Rice finished the regular season with a record of 7–3 overall, and were ranked 19th in the final AP Poll.

== Schedule ==
| Date | Opponent | Rank | Site | Result | Attendance | Source |
|---|---|---|---|---|---|---|
| September 18 | Florida* | No. 16 | Rice Stadium; Houston, TX | W 34–14 | 44,000 | |
| October 2 | Cornell* | No. 16 | Rice Stadium; Houston, TX | W 41–20 | 35,000 | |
| October 9 | at No. 3 Wisconsin* | No. 11 | Camp Randall Stadium; Madison, WI | L 7–13 | 52,819 | |
| October 16 | SMU | No. 15 | Rice Stadium; Houston, TX (rivalry) | L 6–20 | 63,500 | |
| October 23 | Texas | | Rice Stadium; Houston, TX (rivalry) | W 13–7 | 70,500 | |
| October 30 | Vanderbilt* | No. 19 | Rice Stadium; Houston, TX | W 34–13 | 28,000 | |
| November 6 | at No. 4 Arkansas | No. 15 | War Memorial Stadium; Little Rock, AR | L 15–28 | 38,000 | |
| November 13 | at Texas A&M | | Kyle Field; College Station, TX | W 29–19 | 25,000 | |
| November 20 | TCU | | Rice Stadium; Houston, TX | W 6–0 | 32,000 | |
| November 27 | at No. 9 Baylor | | Baylor Stadium; Waco, TX | W 20–14 | 24,000 | |
*Non-conference game; Rankings from AP Poll released prior to the game
