= 1954 Georgia Tech Yellow Jackets football team =

American college football season

1954 Georgia Tech Yellow Jackets football

Cotton Bowl champion

Cotton Bowl Classic, W 14–6 vs. Arkansas
- Conference: Southeastern Conference

Ranking
- Coaches: No. 11
- Record: 8–3 (6–2 SEC)
- Head coach: Bobby Dodd (10th season)
- Captain: Larry Morris
- Home stadium: Grant Field

1954 Southeastern Conference football standings
	Conf.					Overall
Team	W		L		T	W		L		T
No. 6 Ole Miss $	5	–	1	–	0	9	–	2	–	0
Georgia Tech	6	–	2	–	0	8	–	3	–	0
Florida	5	–	2	–	0	5	–	5	–	0
Kentucky	5	–	2	–	0	7	–	3	–	0
Georgia	3	–	2	–	1	6	–	3	–	1
No. 13 Auburn	3	–	3	–	0	8	–	3	–	0
Mississippi State	3	–	3	–	0	6	–	4	–	0
Alabama	3	–	3	–	2	4	–	5	–	2
LSU	2	–	5	–	0	5	–	6	–	0
Tulane	1	–	6	–	1	1	–	6	–	3
Vanderbilt	1	–	5	–	0	2	–	7	–	0
Tennessee	1	–	5	–	0	4	–	6	–	0
$ – Conference champion; Ole Miss's game against Arkansas counted in the conference standings.; Rankings from AP Poll

The 1954 Georgia Tech Yellow Jackets football team represented the Georgia Institute of Technology during the 1954 college football season. The Yellow Jackets were led by 10th-year head coach Bobby Dodd and played their home games at Grant Field in Atlanta. They competed in the Southeastern Conference, finishing second behind Ole Miss. Georgia Tech accepted an invitation to the 1955 Cotton Bowl Classic, where they defeated Southwest Conference champion Arkansas, 14–6.

== Schedule ==
Date	Opponent	Rank	Site	TV	Result	Attendance	Source
September 18	Tulane	No. 7	Grant Field; Atlanta, GA		W 28–0	28,000	
September 25	Florida	No. 5	Grant Field; Atlanta, GA		L 12–13	30,000	
October 2	at SMU*		Cotton Bowl; Dallas, TX		W 10–7	34,504	
October 9	LSU		Grant Field; Atlanta, GA		W 30–20	28,000	
October 16	Auburn	No. 19	Grant Field; Atlanta, GA (rivalry)		W 14–7	40,000	
October 23	Kentucky^{†}	No. 15	Grant Field; Atlanta, GA		L 6–13	34,000	
October 30	at No. 16 Duke*		Duke Stadium; Duke, NC		L 20–21	33,000	
November 6	Tennessee		Grant Field; Atlanta, GA (rivalry)		W 28–7	40,000	
November 13	Alabama		Grant Field; Atlanta, GA (rivalry)	WSB-TV	W 20–0	40,000	
November 27	at Georgia		Sanford Stadium; Athens, GA (rivalry)		W 7–3	50,000	
January 1	vs. No. 13 Arkansas*		Cotton Bowl; Dallas, TX (Cotton Bowl Classic)	NBC	W 14–6	75,500	
*Non-conference game; ^{†}Homecoming; Rankings from AP Poll released prior to the game
