= 1954 Navy Midshipmen football team =

American college football season

1954 Navy Midshipmen football

Eastern champion Sugar Bowl champion

Sugar Bowl, W 21–0 vs. Ole Miss
- Conference: Independent

Ranking
- Coaches: No. 5
- AP: No. 5
- Record: 8–2
- Head coach: Eddie Erdelatz (5th season)
- Captain: Phil Monahan
- Home stadium: Thompson Stadium

1954 Southern college football independents records
	Conf.			Overall
Team	W	L	T	W		L		T
No. 9 Miami (FL)		–		8	–	1	–	0
Delaware		–		8	–	2	–	0
No. 5 Navy		–		8	–	2	–	0
Tampa		–		8	–	2	–	0
Florida State		–		8	–	4	–	0
Abilene Christian		–		6	–	3	–	1
Chattanooga		–		6	–	4	–	0
Mississippi Southern		–		6	–	4	–	0
Memphis State		–		3	–	4	–	3
Louisville		–		3	–	6	–	0
Arkansas State		–		1	–	8	–	0
Sewanee		–		0	–	8	–	0
Rankings from AP Poll

The 1954 Navy Midshipmen football team represented the United States Naval Academy (USNA) as an independent during the 1954 college football season. The team was led by fifth-year head coach Eddie Erdelatz, and they acquired the nickname "Team Named Desire" during the press conference following the 25–0 road shutout of Stanford, when Erdelatz said, "Every man on this team is full of desire."

After defeating No. 5 Army in Philadelphia, the Midshipmen were ranked fifth in both final polls, released in late November, and played in their first bowl game in 31 years. Navy shut out #6 Ole Miss 21–0 in the Sugar Bowl in New Orleans on New Year's Day.

== Schedule ==
Date	Opponent	Rank	Site	Result	Attendance	Source
September 25	William & Mary^{†}		Thompson Stadium; Annapolis, MD	W 27–0	13,369	
October 2	at Dartmouth		Memorial Field; Hanover, NH	W 42–7	13,200	
October 9	at No. 17 Stanford	No. 19	Stanford Stadium; Stanford, CA	W 25–0	50,000–55,000	
October 16	at Pittsburgh	No. 9	Pitt Stadium; Pittsburgh, PA	L 19–21	30,151	
October 23	at Penn		Franklin Field; Philadelphia, PA	W 52–6	41,228	
October 30	vs. No. 6 Notre Dame	No. 15	Memorial Stadium; Baltimore, MD (rivalry)	L 0–6	60,000	
November 6	vs. No. 11 Duke	No. 19	Foreman Field; Norfolk, VA (Oyster Bowl)	W 40–7	28,000–30,000	
November 13	Columbia	No. 10	Thompson Stadium; Annapolis, MD	W 51–6	11,000	
November 27	vs. No. 5 Army	No. 6	Philadelphia Municipal Stadium; Philadelphia, PA (Army–Navy Game)	W 27–20	104,000	
January 1, 1955	vs. No. 6 Ole Miss	No. 5	Tulane Stadium; New Orleans, LA (Sugar Bowl)	W 21–0	80,190	
^{†}Homecoming; Rankings from AP Poll released prior to the game

== Game summaries ==
=== Sugar Bowl vs Ole Miss ===
- Welsh 8/14 passing
- Gattuso (MVP) 111 rush yds, 2 TD
- Weaver 106 rush yds, TD, 3 PAT

== Roster ==
1954 Navy Midshipmen football team roster
Players
Coaches
Offense

Pos.	#	Name	Class
OL	61	Alex Aronis
E	80	Ron Beagle	Jr
OL	69	Frank Bendrick
OL	64	Leonard Benzi
HB	49	Chet Burchett
HB	44	Bob Craig
OL	51	Robert Davis
QB	15	Dick Echard
HB	27	Jack Garrow	Sr
FB	36	Joe Gattuso	Sr
FB	30	Dick Guest
OL	74	Pat McCool
HB	33	Phil Monahan (C)
E	83	Jim Owen
OL	71	Jim Royer
OL	68	George Testor
HB	16	John Weaver
OL	65	Hugh Webster
QB	11	George Welsh	Jr
OL	58	Wilson Whitmire

Defense

Pos.	#	Name	Class

Special teams

Pos.	#	Name	Class
PK	49	Chet Burchett
P	30	Dick Guest
PK	68	George Testor
PK	16	John Weaver

Head coach

- Eddie Erdelatz (5th year)

Coordinators/assistant coaches

- Dick Duden
- Len Eshmont
- Ben Martin

Legend

- (C) Team captain
- (S) Suspended
- (I) Ineligible
- Injured
- Redshirt
