= Andy Pilney =

American athlete and football coach

- Pilney pictured in Jambalaya 1955, Tulane yearbook

Biographical details
- Born: January 19, 1913; Frontenac, Kansas, U.S.
- Died: September 15, 1996 (aged 83); Kenner, Louisiana, U.S.

Playing career

Football
- 1933–1935: Notre Dame

Baseball
- 1934–1936: Notre Dame
- 1936: Boston Bees
- 1936: Syracuse Chiefs
- 1937: Columbia Senators
- 1937: Scranton Miners
- 1938: Indianapolis Indians
- 1939: Erie Sailors
- 1939: Hartford Bees
- Positions: Halfback (football); Outfielder (baseball)

Coaching career (HC unless noted)

Football
- 1942: Washington University (backfield)
- 1943: Georgia Pre-Flight (assistant)
- 1946–1953: Tulane (backfield)
- 1954–1961: Tulane

Head coaching record
- Overall: 25–49–6

Accomplishments and honors

Awards
- Third-team All-American (1935)

Andy Pilney
- Pinch hitter
- Born: January 13, 1913; Frontenac, Kansas
- Died: September 15, 1996 (aged 83); Kenner, Louisiana
- Batted: Right Threw: Right

MLB debut
- June 12, 1936, for the Boston Bees

Last MLB appearance
- June 26, 1936, for the Boston Bees

MLB statistics
- Games played: 3
- At bats: 2
- Strikeouts: 1
- Stats at Baseball Reference

Teams
- Boston Bees (1936)

Antone James "Andy" Pilney (January 19, 1913 – September 15, 1996) was an American football coach and player of football and baseball. He played football and baseball at the University of Notre Dame in the mid-1930s and then professional baseball from 1936 to 1939. Pilney had a three-game stint in Major League Baseball with the Boston Bees in July 1936. He served as the head football coach at Tulane University from 1954 to 1961, compiling a record of 25–49–6.

== College playing career ==
Pilney played football as a halfback at Notre Dame. In 1935, he led the Irish to a come-from-behind win against top-ranked Ohio State in a contest considered to be a "Game of the Century". Pilney was selected by the Detroit Lions in the third round (26th overall pick) of the 1936 NFL draft.

== Professional baseball career ==
Pilney began his professional baseball career in 1936 as an outfielder. While he spent most of the season with the minor league Syracuse Chiefs, he played three games with the Boston Bees in July. He appeared twice as a pinch hitter and once as a pinch runner, but did not play the field. He continued to play in the minors until 1939. As a member of the Indianapolis Indians American Association franchise, Pilney played outfield in 68 games, and batted .261 with eight doubles. On July 14, 1938 he appeared with the Indians in the first-ever All-Star game to be played at Perry Stadium in Indianapolis; batting for starting pitcher Vance Page, he struck out.

== Coaching career ==
Pilney began his college football coaching career in 1942 when he was hired as backfield coach at Washington University in St. Louis.

His final game at Tulane on November 25, 1961 resulted in a 62–0 loss to rival LSU at Baton Rouge, Louisiana. Pilney's successor, Tommy O'Boyle, also lost his final game at the helm of the Green Wave in 1965 to LSU by the same score, 62–0 in Baton Rouge.

== Life after coaching ==
Following his departure from Tulane, Pilney continued to live in the New Orleans area, in the Jefferson Parish suburb of Metairie. He served three terms on the Jefferson Parish Council representing District 4 from 1964 to 1976.

== Head coaching record ==
| Year | Team | Overall | Conference | Standing | Bowl/playoffs |
|---|---|---|---|---|---|
Tulane Green Wave (Southeastern Conference) (1954–1961)
| 1954 | Tulane | 1–6–3 | 1–6–1 | 10th | |
| 1955 | Tulane | 5–4–1 | 3–3–1 | T–6th | |
| 1956 | Tulane | 6–4 | 3–3 | T–6th | |
| 1957 | Tulane | 2–8 | 1–5 | 11th | |
| 1958 | Tulane | 3–7 | 1–5 | 11th | |
| 1959 | Tulane | 3–6–1 | 0–5–1 | 11th | |
| 1960 | Tulane | 3–6–1 | 1–4–1 | 10th | |
| 1961 | Tulane | 2–8 | 1–5 | T–10th | |
| Tulane: | | 25–49–6 | 11–36–4 | | |
| Total: | | 25–49–6 | | | |
