= Harvey Robinson =

American football player and coach (1908–1979)

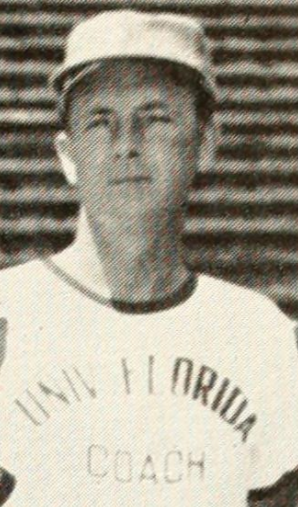
- Robinson, c. 1956

Biographical details
- Born: March 23, 1908; Jupiter, North Carolina, U.S.
- Died: April 25, 1979 (aged 71); Knoxville, Tennessee, U.S.

Playing career
- 1931–1932: Tennessee
- Position: Quarterback

Coaching career (HC unless noted)
- 1935–1941: Central HS (TN)
- 1946–1948: Tennessee (freshmen)
- 1949–1952: Tennessee (backfield)
- 1953–1954: Tennessee
- 1955–1959: Florida (assistant)
- 1960–1963: Tennessee (backfield)

Head coaching record
- Overall: 10–10–1 (college)

Harvey Leigh Robinson (March 23, 1908 – April 25, 1979) was an American football player and coach. He served as the head coach at the University of Tennessee for two seasons, 1953 and 1954, compiling a career record of 10–10–1. Robinson replaced General Robert Neyland, who retired as head coach for health reasons. Robinson then served as an assistant coach at Florida under Bob Woodruff and then returned to Knoxville to serve on the staff of Bowden Wyatt. Robinson later became a scout for the NFL.

== Head coaching record ==
=== College ===
| Year | Team | Overall | Conference | Standing | Bowl/playoffs |
|---|---|---|---|---|---|
Tennessee Volunteers (Southeastern Conference) (1953–1954)
| 1953 | Tennessee | 6–4–1 | 3–2–1 | 7th | |
| 1954 | Tennessee | 4–6 | 1–5 | T–11th | |
| Tennessee: | | 10–10–1 | 4–7–1 | | |
| Total: | | 10–10–1 | | | |
