= 1954 LSU Tigers football team =

American college football season

1954 LSU Tigers football
- Conference: Southeastern Conference
- Record: 5–6 (2–5 SEC)
- Head coach: Gaynell Tinsley (7th season)
- Home stadium: Tiger Stadium

1954 Southeastern Conference football standings
	Conf.					Overall
Team	W		L		T	W		L		T
No. 6 Ole Miss $	5	–	1	–	0	9	–	2	–	0
Georgia Tech	6	–	2	–	0	8	–	3	–	0
Florida	5	–	2	–	0	5	–	5	–	0
Kentucky	5	–	2	–	0	7	–	3	–	0
Georgia	3	–	2	–	1	6	–	3	–	1
No. 13 Auburn	3	–	3	–	0	8	–	3	–	0
Mississippi State	3	–	3	–	0	6	–	4	–	0
Alabama	3	–	3	–	2	4	–	5	–	2
LSU	2	–	5	–	0	5	–	6	–	0
Tulane	1	–	6	–	1	1	–	6	–	3
Vanderbilt	1	–	5	–	0	2	–	7	–	0
Tennessee	1	–	5	–	0	4	–	6	–	0
$ – Conference champion; Ole Miss's game against Arkansas counted in the conference standings.; Rankings from AP Poll

The 1954 LSU Tigers football team was an American football team that represented Louisiana State University (LSU) as a member of the Southeastern Conference (SEC) during the 1954 college football season. In their seventh year under head coach Gaynell Tinsley, the Tigers compiled an overall record of 5–6, with a conference record of 2–5, and finished ninth in the SEC.

== Schedule ==
Date	Opponent	Site	Result	Attendance	Source
September 18	at No. 4 Texas*	Memorial Stadium; Austin, TX	L 6–20	36,000	
September 25	Alabama	Tiger Stadium; Baton Rouge, LA (rivalry)	L 0–12	40,000	
October 2	at Kentucky	McLean Stadium; Lexington, KY	L 6–7		
October 9	at Georgia Tech	Grant Field; Atlanta, GA	L 20–30	28,000	
October 16	No. 20 Texas Tech*	Tiger Stadium; Baton Rouge, LA	W 20–13	25,000	
October 23	No. 18 Florida	Tiger Stadium; Baton Rouge, LA (rivalry)	W 20–7	25,000	
October 30	No. 12 Ole Miss^{†}	Tiger Stadium; Baton Rouge, LA (rivalry)	L 6–21	46,000	
November 6	Chattanooga*	Tiger Stadium; Baton Rouge, LA	W 26–19	11,000	
November 13	Mississippi State	Tiger Stadium; Baton Rouge, LA (rivalry)	L 0–25	20,000	
November 20	vs. No. 9 Arkansas*	State Fair Stadium; Shreveport, LA (rivalry)	W 7–6	33,000	
November 27	Tulane	Tiger Stadium; Baton Rouge, LA (Battle for the Rag)	W 14–13		
*Non-conference game; ^{†}Homecoming; Rankings from AP Poll released prior to the game

== Awards ==
- Sid Fournet: All-American – AP, Look, Colliers, INS, NEA, UP; ALL-SEC
