= 1954 Texas Longhorns football team =

American college football season

1954 Texas Longhorns football
- Conference: Southwest Conference
- Record: 4–5–1 (2–3–1 SWC)
- Head coach: Ed Price (4th season)
- Home stadium: Memorial Stadium

1954 Southwest Conference football standings
| | Conf. | | | | | Overall |
| Team | W | | L | | T | W | | L | | T |
|---|---|---|---|---|---|---|---|---|---|---|
| No. 10 Arkansas $ | 5 | – | 1 | – | 0 | 8 | – | 3 | – | 0 |
| SMU | 4 | – | 1 | – | 1 | 6 | – | 3 | – | 1 |
| No. 19 Rice | 4 | – | 2 | – | 0 | 7 | – | 3 | – | 0 |
| No. 18 Baylor | 4 | – | 2 | – | 0 | 7 | – | 4 | – | 0 |
| Texas | 2 | – | 3 | – | 1 | 4 | – | 5 | – | 1 |
| TCU | 1 | – | 5 | – | 0 | 4 | – | 6 | – | 0 |
| Texas A&M | 0 | – | 6 | – | 0 | 1 | – | 9 | – | 0 |
$ – Conference champion; Rankings from AP Poll

The 1954 Texas Longhorns football team was an American football team that represented the University of Texas (now known as the University of Texas at Austin) as a member of the Southwest Conference (SWC) during the 1954 college football season. In their fourth year under head coach Ed Price, the Longhorns compiled an overall record of 4–5–1, with a mark of 2–3–1 in conference play, and finished fifth in the SWC.

On October 2, 1954, Duke Washington became the first African-American to play in Memorial Stadium. Washington scored on a 73-yard run in the second quarter, but Texas won the game, 40–14.

== Schedule ==
| Date | Opponent | Rank | Site | Result | Attendance | Source |
|---|---|---|---|---|---|---|
| September 18 | LSU* | No. 4 | Memorial Stadium; Austin, TX | W 20–6 | 36,000 | |
| September 25 | at No. 2 Notre Dame* | No. 4 | Notre Dame Stadium; Notre Dame, IN | L 0–21 | 57,594 | |
| October 2 | Washington State* | No. 12 | Memorial Stadium; Austin, TX | W 40–14 | 27,000 | |
| October 9 | vs. No. 1 Oklahoma* | No. 15 | Cotton Bowl; Dallas, TX (rivalry) | L 7–14 | 76,204 | |
| October 16 | No. 12 Arkansas | | Memorial Stadium; Austin, TX (rivalry) | L 7–20 | 42,000 | |
| October 23 | at Rice | | Rice Stadium; Houston, TX (rivalry) | L 7–13 | 70,500 | |
| October 30 | No. 18 SMU | | Memorial Stadium; Austin, TX | T 13–13 | 50,000 | |
| November 6 | at No. 20 Baylor | | Baylor Stadium; Waco, TX (rivalry) | L 7–13 | 31,000–32,000 | |
| November 13 | at TCU | | Amon G. Carter Stadium; Fort Worth, TX (rivalry) | W 35–34 | 37,000 | |
| November 25 | Texas A&M | | Memorial Stadium; Austin, TX (rivalry) | W 22–13 | 58,000 | |
*Non-conference game; Rankings from AP Poll released prior to the game
