= 1954 Gator Bowl (December) =

American college football game

- 10th Gator Bowl
Baylor Bears	Auburn Tigers
(7–3)	(7–3)
SWC	SEC
13	33
Head coach: George Sauer	Head coach: Ralph Jordan
AP / Coaches; 18 / NR	AP / Coaches; 13 / NR
	1	2	3	4	Total
Baylor	7	0	6	0	13
Auburn	7	14	12	0	33
- Date: December 31, 1954
- Season: 1954
- Stadium: Gator Bowl Stadium
- Location: Jacksonville, Florida
- MVP: FB Joe Childress (Auburn); QB Billy Hooper (Baylor)
- Attendance: 34,408

The 1954 Gator Bowl (December) was a college football postseason bowl game that featured the Baylor Bears and the Auburn Tigers.

== Background ==
Baylor finished tied for 3rd in the Southwest Conference in their third bowl appearance in 5 years. Auburn had finished tied for 7th in the Southeastern Conference, in their second straight Gator Bowl appearance, being the first school to ever play in the same bowl twice in the same year.

== Game summary ==
Five plays after Del Shofner fumbled the ball on the opening return (which Auburn recovered at the Baylor 27), Joe Childress scored on a 7-yard run to make it 7-0 with 11:54 in the 1st quarter. A 63-yard drive in 9 plays culminated with a Reuben Saage touchdown plunge to make it tied with 7:05 in the first quarter. Fob James broke the tie with his 43-yard touchdown run in the 2nd quarter. Jimmy Long's catch of Bobby Freeman's touchdown pass from 6 yards out made it 21-7 with only :17 remaining in the 1st half. Childress rushed for his second touchdown plunge midway through the quarter to make it 28-7. L. G. Dupre made it 28-14 on his 38-yard dash with 4:25 to go in the 3rd, but Auburn sealed the deal with a Freeman touchdown run near the end of the third quarter. Joe Childress rushed for 134 yards on 20 carries with 2 touchdowns in a winning MVP effort for Auburn. Billy Hooper threw 9-of-15 for 112 yards for Baylor in a losing MVP effort.

The attendance for the game was 34,408.

=== Scoring summary ===
- Auburn - Childress 7 run (Childress kick), 11:54 remaining in 1st
- Baylor - Saage 1 run (C. Smith kick), 7:05 remaining in 1st
- Auburn - James 43 run (Childress kick), 9:20 remaining in 2nd
- Auburn - Long 6 pass from Freeman (Childress kick), :17 remaining in 2nd
- Auburn - Childress 3 run (kick failed), 7:13 remaining in 3rd
- Baylor - Dupre 38 run (kick failed), 4:25 remaining in 3rd
- Auburn - Freeman 5 run (kick failed), :42 remaining in 3rd

== Aftermath ==
Baylor returned to the bowl in 1960. Auburn would return for their third straight Gator Bowl appearance.

== Statistics ==
Statistics	Baylor	Auburn
First downs	16	25
Rushing yards	105	423
Passing yards	134	53
Passing (C–A–I)	10–18–1	3–7–0
Total offense	239	476
Punts–average	3–42.0	2–41.0
Fumbles–lost	5–4	4–0
Penalties–yards	3–25	5–52
