= 1955 Sugar Bowl =

American college football game

- 21st Sugar Bowl
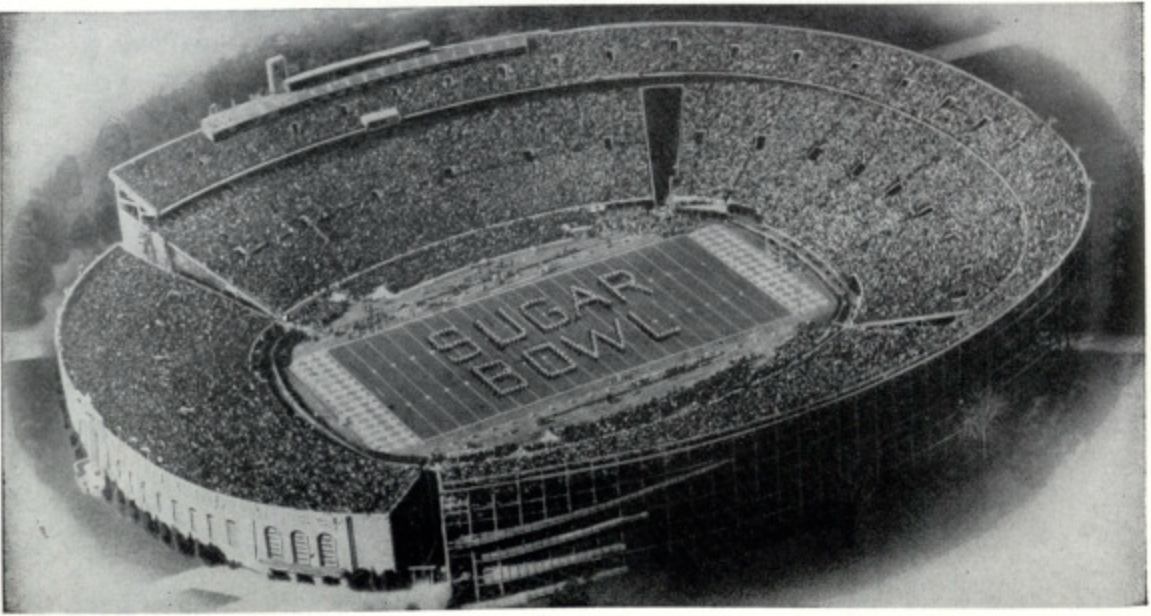
- Tulane Stadium during the Sugar Bowl.
| Ole Miss Rebels | Navy Midshipmen |
| (9–1) | (7–2) |
| SEC | Independent |
| 0 | 21 |
| Head coach: Johnny Vaught | Head coach: Eddie Erdelatz |
| AP / Coaches; 6 / 6 | AP / Coaches; 5 / 5 |
| | 1 | 2 | 3 | 4 | Total |
|---|---|---|---|---|---|
| Ole Miss | 0 | 0 | 0 | 0 | 0 |
| Navy | 7 | 0 | 14 | 0 | 21 |
- Date: January 1, 1955
- Season: 1954
- Stadium: Tulane Stadium
- Location: New Orleans, Louisiana
- MVP: Joe Gattuso
- Favorite: Ole Miss by 1 1/2
- Referee: Albie Booth (ECAC; split crew: ECAC, SEC)
- Attendance: 80,190

United States TV coverage
- Network: ABC
- Announcers: Jack Drees, Bill Stern

The 1955 Sugar Bowl was an American college football bowl game played on January 1, 1955, at Tulane Stadium in New Orleans. The game featured the fifth-ranked Navy Midshipmen and the sixth-ranked Ole Miss Rebels.

Running back Joe Gattuso scored on a 3-yard touchdown run as Navy took a 7–0 lead in the first quarter. The second quarter had no scoring. In the third quarter, Navy quarterback George Welsh threw a 16-yard touchdown pass to halfback Jack Weaver, as Navy took command with a 14–0 lead. Gattuso scored on a 1-yard touchdown run, his second of the game, as Navy built a 21–0 lead. With no more scoring, Navy held on to win. With two rushing touchdowns, Gattuso was named the game's MVP.

== Team selection ==
The 1954 Sugar Bowl, played between the Georgia Tech and West Virginia, was a fiasco for the game's organizers. West Virginia, in an attempt to stop Georgia Tech's rushing attack, utilized an unusual 8-3 defensive structure and set themselves up for a 42–19 rout. The Mid-Winter Sports Association, who organizes the game, wanted to recover from the 1954 disaster. Journalist Marty Mulé wrote that the group "felt obligated to reestablish itself as the premier bowl". Because of this, the organization "went hunting in new territory: the service academies". Army quickly rejected an offer from the Sugar Bowl, but Navy officials said they would consider accepting a bid from the Sugar or Cotton bowls.

=== Navy ===
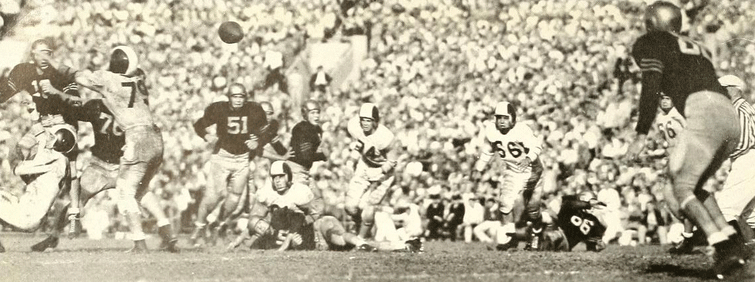
Navy attempting a pass in a 1953 game against Cornell

The 1953 season was a disappointment for Navy, who entered the year ranked 13th in the AP Poll, but finished with a mediocre record at 4–3–2. The Midshipmen were in their fourth season under the leadership of Eddie Erdelatz, who held an 11-14-2 record before the 1953 season, which included a 14–2 upset of undefeated rival Army in 1950. The 1953 season began decently for Navy, but ended in with a 1-3-1 record in their last five games, of which all three losses were to rivals.

The 1954 season began with an easy 27–0 victory over a weak rival William and Mary team which had ruined the Midshipmen's previous season with a 6–6 tie. Navy followed the win with a blowout victory over another weak team, Dartmouth, the following week. After the 42–7 victory, the Midshipmen were ranked on the AP Poll, tying for the nineteenth spot along with Virginia Tech. The team's next game was against a seventeenth-ranked Stanford team. The Indians, which was the team's nickname, were coming off a 12–2 upset of Illinois in the national game of the week. Sportswriters were mixed on who would win the contest, but opinion favored Stanford and a writer for the Eugene Register-Guard, in selecting Navy to win, wrote that was "going out on a limb" with his decision. However, the Midshipmen smashed any doubts and shutout Stanford 25–0. Following the win, Navy jumped in the polls and placed ninth, while receiving one first place vote. Navy was scheduled to play Pittsburgh the following week. The Midshipmen's opponents were coached by former Navy player and coach, as well as future hall-of-fame inductee, Tom Hamilton, who had just taken over the position that week. Navy was upset by Pitt in a close game, by the score of 21–19. After the loss, they dropped completely out of the rankings.

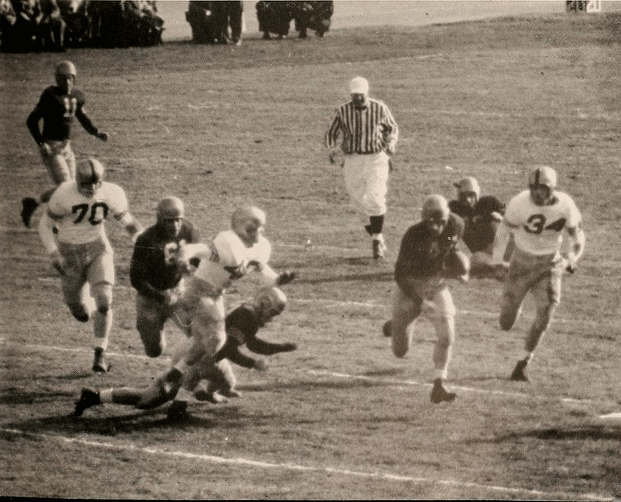
Navy's running back about to score in the Army–Navy Game

The next game for the Midshipmen was against a struggling Pennsylvania team. In a very one-sided match, Navy won in a 52–7 blowout against Penn, who would go winless for the season. The Midshipmen reentered the AP Poll after the game, placing fifteenth. The Notre Dame Fighting Irish, Navy's second-oldest rival, was next up on the Midshipmen's schedule. The Fighting Irish were heavily favored coming into the game, ranked sixth in the AP Poll; they also had won the previous ten games in the rivalry, often by large amounts. However, Navy's coach, Eddie Erdelatz, as well as several sportswriters, held that the Midshipmen could win the game. The game was plagued with sloppy play from both teams, mainly due to muddy field conditions, but Notre Dame won 6–0 with a 46-yard touchdown pass late in the first half. Navy nearly tied the game, but fumbled the ball on the one-yard line. Despite the loss, the Midshipmen managed to remain in the polls, ending the week at number nineteen. Navy's next game was against eleventh-ranked Duke in the eighth annual Oyster Bowl, a special contest organized by several Shrine groups, where proceeds help disabled children. Navy easily defeated Duke by a score of 40–7, which included twice scoring touchdowns with their backup offense.

The Midshipmen's penultimate game was against a poor-quality Columbia team which had won only a single game against a weak schedule. Navy, now ranked tenth, had no trouble with them, winning 51–7. Going into their final game, the Midshipmen were ranked sixth, with two first place votes. Their last game was the annual Army–Navy Game against the fifth-ranked Army Black Knights. Neither team had an edge going into the contest; both had similar records, offensive and defensive rankings, and scores against common opponents. Sportswriters considered the game to be the biggest of the season, and the Lambert-Meadowlands Trophy, awarded to the best team in the Eastern United States, would be awarded to the winner of the game. The match was closely fought throughout, but Navy managed to hold a lead for the majority of the second half, and won 27–20. They moved up to fifth in the polls, and were awarded the Lambert-Meadowlands Trophy in a near-unanimous vote.

=== Ole Miss ===
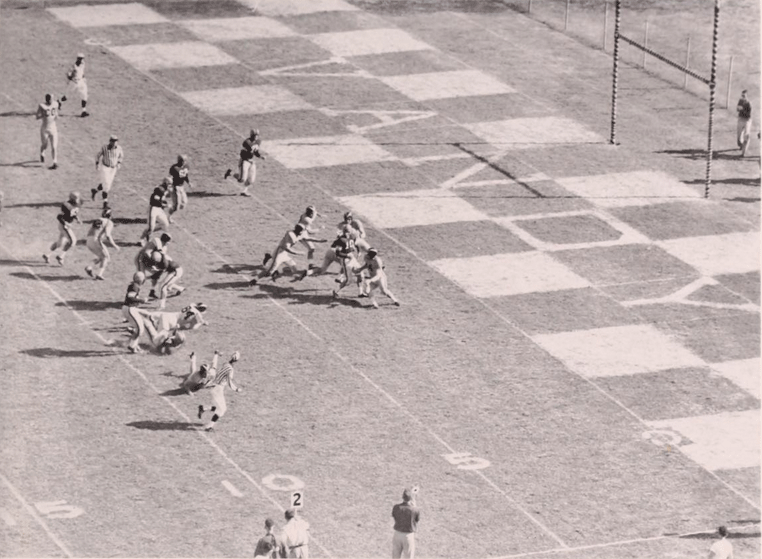
Ole Miss about to score on Vanderbilt in a 1953 contest

The Rebels' 1953 season, despite being worse than the 1952 year, was a moderate success with a 7-2-1 record and a second-place finish in conference play. Johnny Vaught was in his seventh year at the school, during which time he had won them a conference championship and two bowl bids. After a decent start to the 1953 season with two wins and a loss to a conference opponent, Ole Miss went on a five-game winning streak, which hit its peak with an eleventh-place spot in the AP Poll after a blowout of North Texas. However, the year ended on a sour note, losing to national champion Maryland in a shutout and tying arch-rival Mississippi State.

The Rebels began the 1954 season with a game against a mediocre North Texas team. Going into the game ranked tenth in the AP Poll, they were heavily expected to win the game. Ole Miss controlled the contest for its entirety; after allowing North Texas to score on its first drive, Mississippi's defense stopped them quickly the rest of the game, while their offense repeatedly put up big plays that led to a 35–12 victory. Ole Miss moved up one place in the polls after the win and received a single first-place vote. The Rebels' next game was against Kentucky and began Southeastern Conference (SEC) play for both teams. Kentucky scored first with a field goal, but Ole Miss took over afterwards and won easily, 28–9. Mississippi again moved up a single spot in the polls, but received three first place votes. In front of a crowd of about 96,000 people, Ole Miss challenged Villanova the following week. The contest was a slaughter from the beginning and Mississippi, relying mainly on their passing game, won in a shutout 52–0. They moved up another spot in the polls and gained another nine first place votes following the game.

In their second conference game, Ole Miss played a close game against Vanderbilt. Following a closely fought first half, Mississippi pulled away late in the third quarter with two consecutive touchdowns. Vanderbilt attempted to recover, but a late safety sealed a 22–7 victory for the Rebels. Ole Miss did not move in the polls following the game, but did lose a first-place vote. The following week against Tulane was the school's homecoming game. Their third SEC game, Ole Miss was in the lead for the whole contest. Tulane's offense picked up less than fifty yards, their only score in the 34-7 match coming from a ninety-one yard interception return. Following the contest, the Rebels were the only undefeated team left in the SEC. The win propelled Mississippi to the fifth spot in the AP Poll.
