= Duane Nutt =

American football player and coach (1933–2026)

Biographical details
- Born: September 6, 1933
- Died: August 14, 2026 (aged 92)

Playing career
- 1951–1954: SMU
- Position: Quarterback

Coaching career (HC unless noted)
- 1969–1972: Austin

Duane Douglas Nutt (September 6, 1933 – August 14, 2026) was an American football player and coach. He served as the head football coach at Austin College from 1969 to 1972. Nutt played college football for the SMU Mustangs and he was selected 214th overall in the 18th round by the Philadelphia Eagles in the 1955 NFL draft.

Nutt died on August 14, 2026, at the age of 92.
