= 1955 Cotton Bowl Classic =

- 19th Cotton Bowl Classic
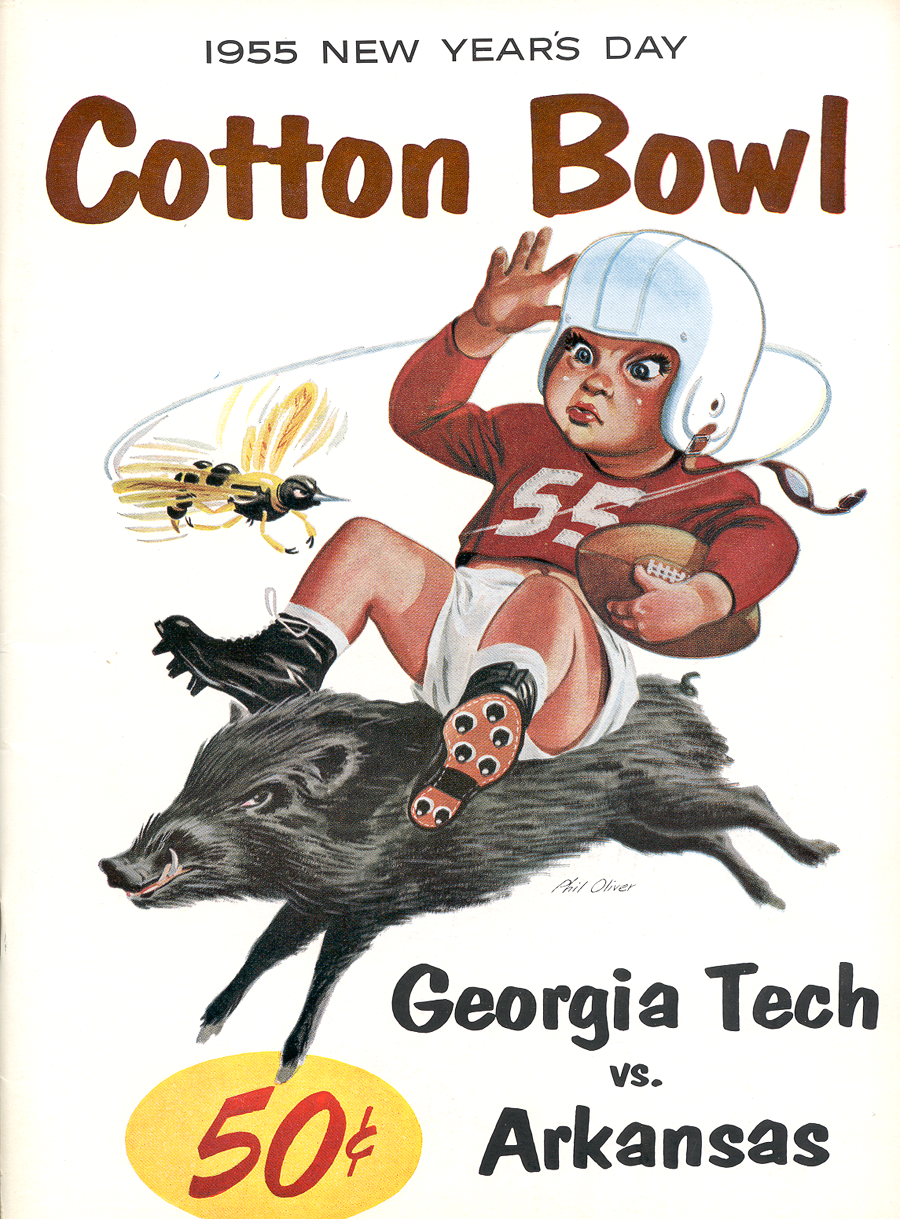
Georgia Tech Yellow Jackets	Arkansas Razorbacks
(7–3)	(8–2)
SEC	SWC
14	6
Head coach: Bobby Dodd	Head coach: Bowden Wyatt
AP / Coaches; NR / 13	AP / Coaches; 10 / 8
	1	2	3	4	Total
Georgia Tech	0	0	7	7	14
Arkansas	0	6	0	0	6
- Date: January 1, 1955
- Season: 1954
- Stadium: Cotton Bowl
- Location: Dallas, Texas
- MVP: FB George Humphreys (Georgia Tech); G Bud Brooks (Arkansas)
- Attendance: 75,550

United States TV coverage
- Network: NBC

The Cotton Bowl in Dallas, Texas, hosted the Cotton Bowl Classic.

The 1955 Cotton Bowl Classic was a post-season college football bowl game between the Southwest Conference champion Arkansas Razorbacks and the champions of the SEC, the Georgia Tech Yellow Jackets. Georgia Tech defeated Arkansas, 14–6, in front of 75,550 spectators. Arkansas would get their revenge in the 1960 Gator Bowl, a 14–7 Hog win.

== Setting ==
Arkansas lost only two games by a total of eight points, despite being picked to finish next-to-last in the SWC during the preseason. The Razorbacks were propelled by their most memorable win, against the #5 Ole Miss Rebels, on what is called the Powder River Play. The game turned on a 66-yard pass from tailback Buddy Bob Benson to blocking back Preston Carpenter, the only score of the game. The halfback pass gave Arkansas the 6-0 in War Memorial Stadium. The play was called "perhaps the most important in Arkansas football history to that time" by Orville Henry. Arkansas had struggled winning bowl games, entering at 1-0-2.

Georgia Tech, however, was very rich in bowl tradition. Bobby Dodd's Ramblin' Wreck had played in four Orange Bowls and three Sugar Bowls entering this matchup. Assistant coach Frank Broyles would become a legend coaching the Razorbacks from 1958–76, including winning the 1964 National Championship.

== Game summary ==
The Razorbacks and Yellow Jackets played to a scoreless tie until Razorback sophomore QB/HB George Walker scored, completing an 80-yard drive before halftime. Walker could not connect on the extra point, however, and Arkansas would go up only 6-0. After halftime, Georgia Tech would take over. The Jackets' powerful running game produced two touchdowns, first by Paul Rotenberry, then by Wade Mitchell, and Arkansas could gain only eight yards rushing in the second half, the combination of which proved enough to defeat the Porkers, 14-6.

Scoring summary

Quarter	Time	Drive			Team	Scoring information	Score	
Quarter	Time	Plays	Yards	TOP	Team	Scoring information	GT	ARK
2	14:58		80	12	ARK	George Walker 3-yard touchdown run, George Walker kick no good	0	6
3	5:06		58	12	GT	Paul Rotenberry 3-yard touchdown run, Wade Mitchell kick good	7	6
4	6:53		43	10	GT	Wade Mitchell 1-yard touchdown run, Wade Mitchell kick good	14	6
"TOP" = time of possession. For other American football terms, see Glossary of American football.							14	6

Georgia Tech won their ninth of eleven bowl games, while Arkansas' record in the postseason dropped to 1-1-2.
