= 1954 college football rankings =

- Season: 1954
- Bowl season: 1954–55 bowl games
- Preseason No. 1: Notre Dame
- End of season champions: Ohio State (AP); UCLA (Coaches)

Two human polls comprised the 1954 college football rankings. Unlike most sports, college football's governing body, the NCAA, does not bestow a national championship, instead that title is bestowed by one or more different polling agencies. There are two main weekly polls that begin in the preseason—the AP Poll and the Coaches Poll.

== Legend ==
	Increase in ranking
	Decrease in ranking
	Not ranked previous week
	National champion
(#–#)	Win–loss record
(Italics)	Number of first place votes
т	Tied with team above or below also with this symbol

== AP Poll ==
The final AP Poll was released on November 29, at the end of the 1954 regular season, weeks before the major bowls. The AP would not release a post-bowl season final poll regularly until 1968.

	Preseason Aug	Week 1 Sep 20	Week 2 Sep 27	Week 3 Oct 4	Week 4 Oct 11	Week 5 Oct 18	Week 6 Oct 25	Week 7 Nov 1	Week 8 Nov 8	Week 9 Nov 15	Week 10 Nov 22	Week 11 (Final) Nov 29	
1.	Notre Dame (52)	Oklahoma (1–0) (56)	Notre Dame (1–0) (94)	Oklahoma (2–0) (77)	Oklahoma (3–0) (118)	Oklahoma (4–0) (115)	Ohio State (5–0) (64)	UCLA (7–0) (72)	UCLA (8–0) (117)	Ohio State (8–0) (87)	Ohio State (9–0) (115)	Ohio State (9–0) (204)	1.
2.	Oklahoma (74)	Notre Dame (0–0) (11)	Oklahoma (2–0) (24)	UCLA (3–0) (20)	Wisconsin (4–0) (21)	Wisconsin (4–0) (42)	Oklahoma (5–0) (74)	Ohio State (6–0) (69)	Ohio State (7–0) (80)	UCLA (8–0) (92)	UCLA (9–0) (85)	UCLA (9–0) (133)	2.
3.	Maryland (13)	Maryland (0–0) (9)	Iowa (1–0) (11)	Wisconsin (2–0) (17)	UCLA (4–0) (10)	UCLA (5–0) (23)	UCLA (6–0) (45)	Oklahoma (6–0) (42)	Oklahoma (7–0) (44)	Oklahoma (8–0) (28)	Oklahoma (9–0) (31)	Oklahoma (10–0) (35)	3.
4.	Texas (10)	Texas (1–0) (3)	UCLA (2–0) (3)	Iowa (2–0) (15)	Ohio State (3–0) (14)	Ohio State (4–0) (8)	Arkansas (5–0) (16)	Arkansas (6–0) (16)	Arkansas (7–0) (43)	Notre Dame (6–1) (2)	Notre Dame (7–1) (4)	Notre Dame (8–1) (9)	4.
5.	Illinois (2)	Georgia Tech (1–0) (2)	Wisconsin (1–0) (7)	Purdue (2–0) (22)	Purdue (2–0–1) (3)	Ole Miss (5–0) (9)	Army (4–1) (1)	Notre Dame (4–1) (4)	Notre Dame (5–1) (3)	Army (7–1)	Army (7–1)	Navy (7–2) (4)	5.
6.	Michigan State (7)	Illinois (0–0)	Maryland (1–0) (3)	Duke (2–0) (3)	Duke (2–0–1) (7)	Notre Dame (3–1)	Notre Dame (3–1) (1)	Miami (FL) (6–0) (14)	Army (6–1) (4)	Ole Miss (8–1) (7)	Navy (6–2) (2)	Ole Miss (9–1) (6)	6.
7.	Georgia Tech (5)	Michigan State (0–0)	Duke (1–0) (7)	Ole Miss (3–0) (12)	Ole Miss (4–0) (11)	Arkansas (4–0) (4)	West Virginia (4–0) (6)	Army (5–1) (1)	Ole Miss (7–1) (5)	Navy (6–2) т	Ole Miss (8–1) (6)	Army (7–2)	7.
8.	UCLA (1)	UCLA (1–0) (2)	Ole Miss (2–0) (3)	Notre Dame (1–1)	Notre Dame (2–1) (2)	Minnesota (4–0)	Wisconsin (4–1)	Purdue (4–1–1)	USC (7–1)	USC (8–1) т	Wisconsin (7–2)	Maryland (7–2–1) (4)	8.
9.	Wisconsin (1)	Ole Miss (1–0) (1)	USC (2–0)	USC (3–0)	Navy (3–0) (1) т	Army (3–1)	Purdue (3–1–1)	Ole Miss (6–1) (2)	Iowa (5–2)	Arkansas (7–1) (5)	Baylor (7–2)	Wisconsin (7–2)	9.
10.	Ole Miss (2)	Baylor (1–0) т	Penn State (1–0)	Ohio State (2–0) (1)	Penn State (3–0) (3) т	West Virginia (3–0) (9)	Miami (FL) (5–0) (6)	USC (6–1)	Navy (5–2)	Minnesota (7–1)	Maryland (6–2–1)	Arkansas (8–2) (4)	10.
11.	Iowa (1)	Wisconsin (0–0) т	Baylor (2–0)	Rice (2–0)	Minnesota (3–0) (2)	Colorado (5–0) (2)	Michigan (4–1)	Duke (4–1–1)	Miami (FL) (6–1)	SMU (5–1–1)	Miami (FL) (7–1) (2)	Miami (FL) (8–1) (7)	11.
12.	California	Iowa (0–0)	Texas (1–1)	Penn State (2–0)	Arkansas (3–0) (1)	Alabama (4–1)	Ole Miss (5–1)	Iowa (4–2)	Cincinnati (8–0)	Michigan (6–2)	West Virginia (7–1) (3)	West Virginia (8–1) (2)	12.
13.	Army	Rice (0–0)	Michigan State (0–1)	Maryland (1–1)	Iowa (2–1)	Purdue (2–1–1)	USC (5–1)	Cincinnati (7–0)	Minnesota (6–1)	Maryland (5–2–1)	Arkansas (7–2) (2)	Auburn (7–3) (1)	13.
14.	Alabama	Texas Tech (1–0) (1)	Ohio State (1–0) (1)	Florida (2–1) (1)	West Virginia (2–0) (6)	Virginia Tech (4–0)	Virginia Tech (5–0) (1)	Minnesota (5–1)	Wisconsin (5–2)	West Virginia (6–1)	Michigan (6–3)	Duke (7–2–1)	14.
15.	Duke (2)	USC (1–0)	South Carolina (1–0) (1)	Texas (2–1)	Rice (2–1)	Georgia Tech (4–1)	Navy (4–1)	Rice (4–2)	Virginia Tech (6–0–1)	Virginia Tech (6–0–1)	Auburn (7–2)	Michigan (6–3)	15.
16.	Rice	Oregon (1–0)	Rice (1–0)	West Virginia (1–0) (5)	Virginia Tech (3–0)	Miami (FL) (4–0)	Duke (3–1–1)	Wisconsin (4–2)	West Virginia (5–1) (2)	Miami (FL) (6–1)	Virginia Tech (7–0–1)	Virginia Tech (8–0–1)	16.
17.	USC	California (0–1)	Texas Tech (2–0)	Stanford (3–0)	Colorado (4–0) (1)	USC (4–1)	TCU (4–2)	West Virginia (4–1) (1)	Maryland (4–2–1)	Wisconsin (6–2)	USC (8–2)	USC (8–3)	17.
18.	Oregon	Army (0–0)	California (1–1)	Minnesota (2–0)	Army (2–1)	Florida (3–2)	SMU (3–1)	Virginia Tech (5–0–1)	Baylor (6–2)	Auburn (7–1)	Kentucky (7–3)	Baylor (7–3)	18.
19.	Texas Tech	Duke (0–0)	Purdue (1–0)	Navy (2–0) т	Georgia Tech (3–1)	Duke (2–1–1)	Rice (3–2)	Navy (4–2)	SMU (4–1–1)	Iowa (5–3)	Penn State (7–2)	Rice (7–3)	19.
20.	Ohio State (1)	TCU (1–0)	Florida (1–1)	Virginia Tech (3–0) т	Texas Tech (3–0–1)	TCU (3–2)	Cincinnati (6–0)	Baylor (5–2) т; Nebraska (4–2) т; Pittsburgh (3–3) т	Georgia (6–1–1)	Baylor (6–2)	Duke (6–2–1) т; Minnesota (7–2) т	Penn State (7–2)	20.
	Preseason Aug	Week 1 Sep 20	Week 2 Sep 27	Week 3 Oct 4	Week 4 Oct 11	Week 5 Oct 18	Week 6 Oct 25	Week 7 Nov 1	Week 8 Nov 8	Week 9 Nov 15	Week 10 Nov 22	Week 11 (Final) Nov 29	
		Dropped: Alabama; Ohio State	Dropped: Army; Georgia Tech; Illinois; Oregon; TCU	Dropped: Baylor; California; Michigan State; South Carolina; Texas Tech	Dropped: Florida; Maryland; Stanford; Texas; USC	Dropped: Iowa; Navy; Penn State; Rice; Texas Tech	Dropped: Alabama; Colorado; Florida; Georgia Tech; Minnesota	Dropped: Michigan; SMU; TCU	Dropped: Duke; Nebraska; Pittsburgh; Purdue; Rice	Dropped: Cincinnati; Georgia	Dropped: Iowa; SMU	Dropped: Kentucky; Minnesota	

== United Press Coaches Poll ==
The final United Press (UP) Coaches Poll was released prior to the bowl games, on November 29.
UCLA received 21 of the 35 first-place votes; Ohio State received eleven, and one each to Oklahoma, Notre Dame, and Navy.

Ranking	Team	Conference	Bowl
1	UCLA	Pacific Coast	none
2	Ohio State	Big Ten	Won Rose, 20–7
3	Oklahoma	Big Seven	none
4	Notre Dame	Independent	none
5	Navy	Independent	Won Sugar, 21–0
6	Ole Miss	SEC	Lost Sugar, 0–21
7	Army	Independent	none
8	Arkansas	Southwest	Lost Cotton, 6–14
9	Miami (FL)	Independent	none
10	Wisconsin	Big Ten	none
11	USC	Pacific Coast	Lost Rose, 7–20
12	Maryland	ACC	none
13	Georgia Tech	SEC	Won Cotton, 14–6
14	Duke	ACC	Won Orange, 34–7
15	Michigan	Big Ten	none
15	Penn State	Independent	none
17	SMU	Southwest	none
18	Denver	Skyline	none
18	Rice	Southwest	none
20	Minnesota	Big Ten	none

- The NCAA record book lists USC, Maryland, and Georgia Tech in a tie for 11th place, while contemporary sources list them in 11th, 12th, and 13th respectively.
- Prior to the 1975 season, the Big Ten and Pacific Coast (later AAWU / Pac-8) conferences allowed only one postseason participant each, for the Rose Bowl.

== Litkenhous Ratings ==
The Litkenhous Ratings released in mid-December 1954 provided numerical rankings to over 600 college football programs. The top 50 ranked teams were:

1. UCLA (9-0) - 115.3
2. Ohio State (10-0) - 113.3
3. Oklahoma (10-0) - 111.8
4. Maryland (7-2-1) - 107.4
5. Notre Dame (9-1) - 107.4
6. Wisconsin (7-2) - 106.7
7. Iowa (5-4) - 104.9
8. Ole Miss (9-2) - 103.6
9. Purdue (5-3-1) - 102.5
10. Michigan (6-3) - 102.0
11. Miami (FL) (8-1) - 101.6
12. Navy (8-2) - 101.5
13. Arkansas (8-3) - 100.8
14. Baylor (7-4) - 100.4
15. Minnesota (7-2) - 99.6
16. Auburn (8-3) - 99.2
17. Army (7-2) - 98.9
18. Michigan State (3-6) - 98.9
19. Rice (7-3) - 98.7
20. USC (8-4) - 98.7
21. SMU (6-3-1) - 98.6
22. Colorado (7-2-1) - 97.8
23. Georgia Tech (8-3) - 97.0
24. Texas Tech (7-2-1) - 97.0
25. Texas (4-5-1) - 96.5
26. California (5-5) - 96.3
27. TCU (4-6) - 96.0
28. Indiana (3-6) - 93.1
29. Duke (8-2-1) - 93.0
30. Miami (OH) (8-1) - 92.8
31. Northwestern
32. Florida (5-5) - 89.8
33. Penn State
34. Pittsburgh
35. Nebraska
36. Kentucky (7-3) - 88.2
37. West Virginia
38. Southeastern Louisiana
39. Alabama (4-5-2) - 87.5
40. Arizona
41. Mississippi State (6-4) - 87.4
42. Wichita
43. Cincinnati
44. Missouri
45. LSU (5-6) - 86.9
46. Oregon
47. Illinois (1-8) - 86.4
48. Georgia (6-3-1) - 85.6
49. Texas A&M (1-9) - 85.0
50. Oklahoma A&M
51. Clemson
52. Trinity (TX)
53. Virginia Tech
54. South Carolina
55. Vanderbilt (2-7) - 82.2
56. Kansas State
57. Denver
58. Mississippi Southern
59. Boston University
60. Iowa State
61. Tennessee (4-6) - 79.0
62. Delaware
63. Boston College
64. Tulane (1-6-3) - 77.8
65. Texas Western
66. Houston
67. North Carolina
68. Wake Forest
69. Washington State
70. Stanford
71. Chattanooga
72. San Jose State
73. Florida State
74. North Texas
75. Washington
76. Wyoming
77. Kent State
78. Pacific
79. Brown
80. Howard Payne
81. Virginia
82. Abilene Christian
83. Cornell
84. Detroit
85. Princeton
86. Marquette
87. New Hampshire
88. Colgate
89. Syracuse
90. Richmond
91. McMurry
92. NC State
93. Yale
94. Bucknell
95. Omaha
96. Dayton
97. Eastern Kentucky
98. Utah
99. William & Mary
100. Kansas
101. Hardin-Simmons
102. George Washington
103. Mt. San Antonio
104. Louisiana Tech
105. Memphis State
106. East Texas
107. Sam Houston
108. Stephen F. Austin
109. Harvar
110. Youngstown
111. Bakersfield
112. Holy Cross
113. Utah State
114. Ohio
115. Rutgers
116. Arizona State
118. Xavier
119. Rhode Island
120. Idaho
121. Oregon State
122. South Dakota State
123. Toledo
124. Tulsa
125. West Texas
126. New Mexico
127. Maine
128. Tampa (8-2) - 62.4
129. Temple (3-5) - 61.1
130. VMI (4-6) - 61.1
131. Washington University (6-3) - 60.4
132. Furman (5-5) - 60.3
136. Delta State - 59.9
137. Penn (0-9) - 59.7
138. Dartmouth (3-6) - 59.6
144. Trinity (CT) (7-0) - 59.2
146. John Carroll - 59.1
147. Marshall (4-5) - 59.1
148. Western Michigan (4-5) - 59.1
151. Northeastern - 58.6
152. Montana (3-6) - 58.5
153. Villanova (1-9) - 58.4
154. Lafayette (7-2) - 58.2
155. Tennessee Tech - 58.2
157. Colorado A&M (3-7) - 58.1
160. Montana State (8-1) - 57.6
161. Missouri Valley - 57.6
162. West Chester - 57.6
163. Lehigh (2-5-2) - 56.9
166. Murray - 56.7
167. BYU (1-8) - 56.2
168. Peru State - 56.2
170. Florence - 56.1
177. Davidson (6-3) - 54.8
178. Muhlenberg - 54.7
179. St. John's - 54.0
183. Sul Ross - 53.8
184. Fordham (1-7-1) - 53.7
187. Valparaiso - 53.2
188. Western Kentucky (7-3) - 53.0
190. Vermont (5-1-1) - 53.0
193. San Francisco State (8-2) - 52.8
198. Wofford - 51.7
200. Amherst - 51.4
205. Hawaii (4-4) - 51.0

== HBCU rankings ==
The Pittsburgh Courier, a leading African American newspaper, ranked the top 1954 teams from historically black colleges and universities in an era when college football was largely segregated. The rankings were published on December 11:

- 1. Tennessee A&I (10–1)
- 2. Florida A&M (8–1)
- 3. Southern (10–1)
- 4. North Carolina College (7–1–1)
- 5. Virginia State (7–2)
- 6. Maryland State (6–1–1)
- 7. Prairie View A&M (10–1)
- 8. South Carolina State (8–2)
- 9. Morris Brown (5–3)
- 10. Alcorn State (5–2–2)
- 11. Lincoln (MO) (4–3–1)
- 12. Xavier (LA) (6–2)
- 13. Morgan State (6–3)
- 14. Texas Southern (4–3–2)
- 15. Grambling (4–2–2)

The Associated Negro Press also published rankings on December 25:

- 1. Tennessee A&I (10–1)
- 2. Florida A&M (8–1)
- 3. Prairie View A&M (10–1)
- 4. Southern (10–1)
- 5. N.C. College (7–1–1)
- 6. Maryland State (6–1–1)
- 7. Xavier (LA) (6–2)
- 8. Virginia State (7–2)
- 9. South Carolina State (8–2)
- 10. Bluefield State (7–2)
- 11. Miles (8–0)
- 12. Virginia Union (5–3)
- 13. Texas Southern (5–4–2)
- 14. Allen (5–4)
- 15. Bethune-Cookman (7–3)
- 16. Lincoln (MO) (4–3–1)
- 17. Alcorn (6–2–2)
- 18. St. Augustine's (6–2)
- 19. Central State (4–4)
- 20. Kentucky State (5–3)
- 21. Morris Brown (5–3)
- 22. Grambling (4–3–2)
- 23. Morgan State (5–3)
- 24. North Carolina A&T (4–5)
- 25. Mississippi Vocational (6–2)
- 26. Delaware State (7–1)
- 27. Elizabeth City (5–1)
- 28. Fort Valley State (5–4)
- 29. Langston (4–4–1)
- 30. Claflin (6–3)
- 31. Knoxville (5–3–1)
- 32. Alabama State (4–3–1)
- 33. Hampton (4–5–1)
- 34. Dillard (4–4)
- 35. Tuskegee (3–5)
- 36. Texas College (4–5)
- 37. Morehouse (4–3)
- 38. West Virginia State (3–6)
- 39. Lincoln (PA) (4–3–1)
- 40. Wiley (5–5)
- 41. Fisk (4–4)
- 42. Arkansas A&M (2–7–2)
- 43. Mississippi Industrial (2–3)
- 44. Winston-Salem State (2–7)
- 45. Fayetteville State (3–6)
- 46. Paul Quinn (2–5–1)
- 47. Florida Normal (3–1–1)
- 48. Livingstone (4–1)
- 49. Clark (1–7)
- 50. Howard (2–6–1)
- 51. Jackson State (1–7–1)
- 52. Tougaloo (3–5)
- 53. Johnson C. Smith (1–5–2)
- 54. Saint Paul's (1–7)
- 55. Albany State (1–3–1)
- 56. Morris College (2–3)
- 57. Philander Smith (1–4)
- 58. Savannah State (1–6)
- 59. Alabama A&M (1–7)
- 60. Benedict (0–8)
- 61. Shaw (0–7–1)
- 62. Lane (1–4)
- 63. Bishop (1–7)
- 64. Paine (0–5)
- 65. Rust (0–5)
- 66. Morristown (0–4)

== See also ==
- 1954 College Football All-America Team
