= 1954 Arkansas Razorbacks football team =

American college football season

1954 Arkansas Razorbacks football

SWC champion

Cotton Bowl, L 14–6 vs. Georgia Tech
- Conference: Southwest Conference

Ranking
- Coaches: No. 8
- AP: No. 10
- Record: 8–3 (5–1 SWC)
- Head coach: Bowden Wyatt (2nd season)
- Captains: Bobby Proctor; Jim Roth
- Home stadium: Razorback Stadium; War Memorial Stadium

1954 Southwest Conference football standings
	Conf.					Overall
Team	W		L		T	W		L		T
No. 10 Arkansas $	5	–	1	–	0	8	–	3	–	0
SMU	4	–	1	–	1	6	–	3	–	1
No. 19 Rice	4	–	2	–	0	7	–	3	–	0
No. 18 Baylor	4	–	2	–	0	7	–	4	–	0
Texas	2	–	3	–	1	4	–	5	–	1
TCU	1	–	5	–	0	4	–	6	–	0
Texas A&M	0	–	6	–	0	1	–	9	–	0
$ – Conference champion; Rankings from AP Poll

The 1954 Arkansas Razorbacks football team represented the University of Arkansas in the Southwest Conference (SWC) during the 1954 college football season. In their second and final year under head coach Bowden Wyatt, the Razorbacks compiled an 8–3 record (5–1 against SWC opponents), won the SWC championship, and outscored all opponents by a combined total of 195 to 104.

The team, which consisted of 25 players, was known as the "25 Little Pigs." The team won the Southwest Conference championship.

== Schedule ==
Date	Opponent	Rank	Site	TV	Result	Attendance	Source
September 25	Tulsa*		Razorback Stadium; Fayetteville, AR		W 41–0	13,000	
October 2	at TCU		Amon G. Carter Stadium; Fort Worth, TX		W 20–13	25,000	
October 9	Baylor		Razorback Stadium; Fayetteville, AR		W 21–20	18,000	
October 16	at Texas	No. 12	Memorial Stadium; Austin, TX (rivalry)		W 20–7	42,000	
October 23	No. 5 Ole Miss*	No. 7	War Memorial Stadium; Little Rock, AR (rivalry)	ABC	W 6–0	38,000	
October 30	at Texas A&M	No. 4	Kyle Field; College Station, TX (rivalry)		W 14–7		
November 6	No. 15 Rice	No. 4	War Memorial Stadium; Little Rock, AR		W 28–15	38,000	
November 13	No. 19 SMU	No. 4	Razorback Stadium; Fayetteville, AR		L 14–21	25,000	
November 20	vs. LSU*	No. 9	State Fair Stadium; Shreveport, LA (rivalry)		L 6–7	33,000	
November 27	at Houston*	No. 13	Rice Stadium; Houston, TX		W 19–0	25,000	
January 1	vs. Georgia Tech*	No. 10	Cotton Bowl; Dallas, TX (Cotton Bowl)	NBC	L 6–14	75,500	
*Non-conference game; Rankings from AP Poll released prior to the game

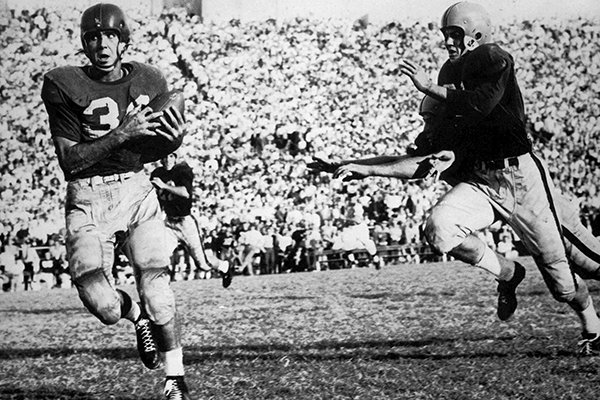
Preston Carpenter outruns an Ole Miss player during their 1954 meeting

== Game summaries ==
=== Ole Miss ===
Team	1	2	3	4	Total
Ole Miss	0	0	0	0	0
• Arkansas	0	0	0	6	6

- Date: October 23
- Location: War Memorial Stadium, Little Rock, Arkansas

Scoring summary
4	ARK	Preston Carpenter 66 yard pass from Buddy Benson	ARK 6-0

This contest had been designated as a Southeastern Conference game because Ole Miss had not scheduled required six conference games to be eligible for SEC title.

=== Cotton Bowl ===
	1	2	3	4	Total
Georgia Tech	0	0	7	7	14
Arkansas	0	6	0	0	6
