= Wes Stevens =

American football and baseball coach (1919–1994)

- Stevens pictured in Sequel 1955, Western Illinois yearbook

Biographical details
- Born: December 10, 1919; Rochester, Vermont, U.S.
- Died: December 25, 1994 (aged 75); Macomb, Illinois, U.S.

Playing career

Football
- 1939–1941: Purdue
- Position: Tackle

Coaching career (HC unless noted)

Football
- 1946–1948: Kent State (assistant)
- 1949: Bates (line)
- 1951–1953: Western Reserve (line)
- 1954–1956: Western Illinois

Baseball
- 1946–1948: Kent State

Head coaching record
- Overall: 17–8–4 (football); 18–14–1 (baseball)

Wesley Charles Stevens (December 10, 1919 – December 25, 1994) was an American football and baseball coach. He served as the head football coach at Western Illinois University in Macomb, Illinois from 1954 to 1956, compiling a record of 17–8–4. Stevens was also the head baseball coach at Kent State University from 1947 to 1948, tallying a mark of 18–14–1.

Stevens was born on December 10, 1919, in Rochester, Vermont. He graduated from Purdue University in 1942 before serving at a second lieutenant in the United States Navy during World War II. Stevens later earned a master's degree from Case Western Reserve University. After his coaching career, Stevens served in a number of administrative roles at Western Illinois. He was the director of admissions for 14 years, then academic personnel officer, assistant to the academic vice president, and acting director of personnel prior to his retirement in 1978. Stevens died on December 25, 1994, at his home in Macomb.

== Head coaching record ==
=== Football ===
Year	Team	Overall	Conference	Standing	Bowl/playoffs
Western Illinois Leathernecks (Interstate Intercollegiate Athletic Conference) (1954–1956)
1954	Western Illinois	6–1–3	3–1–2	3rd	
1955	Western Illinois	5–4–1	2–3–1	T–4th	
1956	Western Illinois	6–3	4–2	2nd	
Western Illinois:		17–8–4	9–6–3		
Total:		17–8–4			
