= Del Anderson =

American football coach (1911–1989)

Biographical details
- Born: August 20, 1911; New Concord, Ohio, U.S.
- Died: June 23, 1989 (aged 77); Mishawaka, Indiana, U.S.

Playing career

Football
- c. 1933: Muskingum

Basketball
- c. 1933: Muskingum

Coaching career (HC unless noted)

Football
- 1934–1936: Adamsville HS (OH)
- 1937–1941: Hillsboro HS (OH)
- 1942–?: Youngstown South HS (OH)
- ?–1947: Case Tech (backfield)
- 1948–1953: Albion
- 1954–1955: North Dakota State

Head coaching record
- Overall: 29–35–4 (college)

Accomplishments and honors

Championships
- 1 MIAA (1952)

Delmar W. Anderson (August 20, 1911 – June 23, 1989) was an American football coach. He was the head football coach at Albion College from 1948 to 1953 and at North Dakota State University from 1954 to 1955. Anderson's overall record in eight years as a college football head coach was 29–35–4.

In 1952, Anderson led Albion to its first Michigan Intercollegiate Athletic Association championship since 1940 with a 59–7 win over Kalamazoo in the championship game. The team finished with a 7–1 record with the only loss coming early in the season in a road game against Michigan Tech. At North Dakota State, Anderson won only one game in two years and compiled a record of 1–17–1.

Before coaching at Albion, Anderson was a backfield coach at Case Institute of Technology and a high school football coach in Adamsville, Ohio, Hillsboro, Ohio, and Youngstown, Ohio. He graduated from Muskingum College in 1933 and earned a master's degree from the Ohio State University. He also served in the United States Navy during World War II.

== Head coaching record ==
=== College ===
Year	Team	Overall	Conference	Standing	Bowl/playoffs
Albion Britons (Michigan Intercollegiate Athletic Association) (1948–1953)
1948	Albion	2–6	0–5	6th	
1949	Albion	2–6–1	0–5	6th	
1950	Albion	6–2–1	2–2–1	T–3rd	
1951	Albion	6–2	3–2	3rd	
1952	Albion	7–1	5–0	1st	
1953	Albion	5–2–1	4–1–1	2nd	
Albion:		28–19–3	14–15–2		
North Dakota State Bison (North Central Conference) (1954–1955)
1954	North Dakota State	1–7–1	1–4–1	6th	
1955	North Dakota State	0–9	0–6	7th	
North Dakota State:		1–16–1	1–10–1		
Total:		29–35–4			
National championship Conference title Conference division title or championship game berth
