= 1954 Florida A&M Rattlers football team =

American college football season

1954 Florida A&M Rattlers football

Black college national co-champion SIAC champion

Orange Blossom Classic, W 67–19 vs. Maryland State
- Conference: Southern Intercollegiate Athletic Conference
- Record: 8–1 (4–0 SIAC)
- Head coach: Jake Gaither (10th season)
- Home stadium: Bragg Stadium

1954 Southern Intercollegiate Athletic Conference football standings
	Conf.					Overall
Team	W		L		T	W		L		T
Florida A&M $	4	–	0	–	0	8	–	1	–	0
Morris Brown	5	–	1	–	0	5	–	3	–	0
South Carolina State	5	–	1	–	0	7	–	2	–	0
Xavier (LA)	5	–	1	–	0	6	–	2	–	0
Fort Valley State	4	–	3	–	0	5	–	4	–	0
Allen	3	–	2	–	0	6	–	4	–	0
Fisk	4	–	1	–	0	4	–	4	–	0
Alabama State	4	–	3	–	0	6	–	3	–	0
Knoxville	3	–	1	–	1	5	–	3	–	1
Morehouse	3	–	3	–	0	4	–	4	–	0
Bethune–Cookman	1	–	3	–	0	5	–	3	–	0
Tuskegee	2	–	5	–	1	3	–	5	–	1
Clark (GA)	1	–	7	–	0	1	–	7	–	0
Alabama A&M	2	–	6	–	0	2	–	7	–	0
Lane	0	–	3	–	0	2	–	6	–	0
Benedict	0	–	6	–	0	0	–	7	–	1
$ – Conference champion; Standings were based on Dickinson System ratings.

Nineteen lettermen returned from the 10–1 1953 squad to play for the 1954 Rattlers team.

The 1954 Florida A&M Rattlers football team was an American football team that represented Florida A&M University as a member of the Southern Intercollegiate Athletic Conference (SIAC) during the 1954 college football season. In their 10th season under head coach Jake Gaither, the Rattlers compiled an 8–1 record, including a victory over Maryland State in the Orange Blossom Classic. The team played its home games at Bragg Stadium in Tallahassee, Florida.

The Pittsburgh Courier selected Florida A&M as Black college national co-champion in a five-way tie with four other teams. The "Pigskin Huddle" rated Florida A&M No. 2 with Tennessee A&I as the national champion.

Key players included three-time All-American and future National Football League star, left halfback Willie Galimore.

== Schedule ==
Date	Opponent	Site	Result	Attendance	Source
September 25	Texas College*	Bragg Stadium; Tallahassee, FL	W 39–14	3,000	
October 2	at Benedict	Antisdel Bowl; Columbia, SC	W 26–6		
October 16	at Morris Brown	Herndon Stadium; Atlanta, GA	W 27–7		
October 23	at Prairie View A&M*	Blackshear Field; Prairie View, TX	W 19–7		
October 30	vs. Xavier (LA)	Gator Bowl Stadium; Jacksonville, FL	W 25–6	13,000	
November 6	North Carolina A&T*^{†}	Bragg Stadium; Tallahassee, FL	W 14–7	12,000	
November 13	Allen	Bragg Stadium; Tallahassee, FL	W 68–13		
November 20	at Southern*	University Stadium; Baton Rouge, LA	L 23–59		
December 4	vs. Maryland State*	Burdine Stadium; Miami, FL (Orange Blossom Classic)	W 67–19	41,179	
*Non-conference game; ^{†}Homecoming
