= 1954 Central Michigan Chippewas football team =

American college football season

1954 Central Michigan Chippewas football

IIAC co-champion
- Conference: Interstate Intercollegiate Athletic Conference
- Record: 8–2 (5–1 IIAC)
- Head coach: Kenneth Kelly (4th season)
- MVP: Dick Kackmeister
- Home stadium: Alumni Field

1954 Interstate Intercollegiate Athletic Conference football standings
	Conf.					Overall
Team	W		L		T	W		L		T
Michigan State Normal +	5	–	1	–	0	8	–	1	–	0
Central Michigan +	5	–	1	–	0	8	–	2	–	0
Western Illinois	3	–	1	–	2	6	–	1	–	3
Illinois State Normal	3	–	2	–	1	5	–	3	–	1
Eastern Illinois	1	–	4	–	1	2	–	6	–	1
Southern Illinois	1	–	5	–	0	2	–	7	–	0
Northern Illinois State	1	–	5	–	0	2	–	7	–	0
+ – Conference co-champions

The 1954 Central Michigan Chippewas football team represented Central Michigan College of Education, renamed Central Michigan University in 1959, in the Interstate Intercollegiate Athletic Conference (IIAC) during the 1954 college football season. In their fourth season under head coach Kenneth Kelly, the Chippewas compiled an 8–2 record (5–1 against IIAC opponents), tied for the IIAC championship, and outscored all opponents by a combined total of 321 to 107.

The team's statistical leaders included Jim King with 399 passing yards, Jim Podoley with 1,079 rushing yards, and Jerry Thomas with 121 receiving yards. Center Dick Kackmeister received the team's most valuable player award. Four Central Michigan players (Podoley, Kackmeister, guard Ray Figg, and halfback LaVerne Wolf) received first-team honors on the All-IIAC team.

== Schedule ==
Date	Opponent	Site	Result	Attendance	Source
September 11	vs. Milwaukee State*	Saginaw, MI	W 26–7		
September 18	Iowa State Teachers*	Alumni Field; Mount Pleasant, MI	W 42–21		
September 25	at Western Michigan*	Waldo Stadium; Kalamazoo, MI (rivalry)	W 25–19		
October 2	at Eastern Illinois	Lincoln Field; Charleston, IL	W 60–0	1,200	
October 9	at Great Lakes Naval*	Chicago, IL	L 28–32		
October 16	Southern Illinois^{†}	Alumni Field; Mount Pleasant, MI	W 33–0	3,000	
October 23	at Western Illinois	Hanson Field; Macomb, IL	L 7–14	10,000	
October 30	Illinois State Normal	Alumni Field; Mount Pleasant, MI	W 26–0		
November 6	at Northern Illinois State	Glidden Field; DeKalb, IL	W 46–7		
November 13	Michigan State Normal	Alumni Field; Mount Pleasant, MI (rivalry)	W 28–7		
*Non-conference game; ^{†}Homecoming
