= 1954 Iowa State Teachers Panthers football team =

American college football season

1954 State College of Iowa Panthers football
- Conference: North Central Conference
- Record: 3–5 (3–3 NCC)
- Head coach: Clyde Starbeck (17th season)
- Home stadium: O. R. Latham Stadium

1954 North Central Conference football standings
	Conf.					Overall
Team	W		L		T	W		L		T
South Dakota State +	5	–	1	–	0	7	–	2	–	0
Morningside +	5	–	1	–	0	5	–	3	–	0
South Dakota	3	–	3	–	0	5	–	4	–	0
North Dakota	3	–	3	–	0	4	–	5	–	0
Iowa State Teachers	3	–	3	–	0	3	–	5	–	0
North Dakota State	1	–	4	–	1	1	–	7	–	1
Augustana (SD)	0	–	5	–	1	1	–	7	–	1
+ – Conference co-champions

The 1954 Iowa State Teachers Panthers football team was an American football team that represented Iowa State Teachers College (later renamed University of Northern Iowa) as a member of the North Central Conference (NCC) during the 1954 college football season. In their 17th season under head coach Clyde Starbeck, the Panthers compiled a 3–5 record (3–3 in conference games) and finished in three-way tie for third place in the NCC.

Two I.S.C. players were named to the all-NCC team: end Dick Beetsch and tackle LeRoy Dunn.

The team played its home games at O. R. Latham Stadium in Cedar Falls, Iowa.

== Schedule ==
Date	Opponent	Site	Result	Attendance	Source
September 18	at Central Michigan		L 21–42		
September 25	North Dakota State		W 39–0		
October 9	Drake		L 12–14		
October 16	at North Dakota		W 14–13		
October 23	at Augustana (SD)		L 33–34		
October 30	at Morningside		L 12–20		
November 6	South Dakota		L 33–34		
November 13	South Dakota State		L 20–41		
