= 1954 North Carolina College Eagles football team =

American college football season

1954 North Carolina College Eagles football

Black college national co-champion CIAA champion

National Classic, W 19–6 vs. Tennessee A&I
- Conference: Central Intercollegiate Athletic Association
- Record: 7–1–1 (6–0–1 CIAA)
- Head coach: Herman Riddick (10th season)
- Home stadium: O'Kelly Field

1954 Central Intercollegiate Athletic Association football standings
	Conf.					Overall
Team	W		L		T	W		L		T
No. 5 North Carolina College $	6	–	0	–	1	7	–	1	–	1
No. 6 Maryland State	5	–	0	–	1	6	–	1	–	1
No. 8 Virginia State	7	–	1	–	0	7	–	2	–	0
No. 10 Bluefield State	6	–	1	–	0	8	–	2	–	0
No. 18 St. Augustine's	6	–	2	–	0	6	–	3	–	0
Delaware State	5	–	1	–	0	7	–	1	–	0
No. 12 Virginia Union	5	–	3	–	0	5	–	3	–	0
No. 23 Morgan State	4	–	2	–	0	6	–	3	–	0
Hampton	4	–	5	–	1	4	–	5	–	1
Lincoln (PA)	3	–	3	–	0	4	–	3	–	1
No. 24 North Carolina A&T	2	–	5	–	0	4	–	6	–	0
Winston-Salem State	2	–	5	–	0	3	–	5	–	0
Johnson C. Smith	1	–	4	–	1	1	–	5	–	2
West Virginia State	1	–	5	–	0	3	–	6	–	0
Fayetteville State	1	–	5	–	0	3	–	6	–	0
Saint Paul's (VA)	1	–	6	–	0	2	–	6	–	0
Howard	0	–	5	–	1	2	–	6	–	1
Shaw	0	–	6	–	1	0	–	7	–	1
$ – Conference champion; Conference standings were based on the Dickinson System.; Rankings from Associated Negro Press

The 1954 North Carolina College Eagles football team was an American football team that represented North Carolina College in the Central Intercollegiate Athletic Association (CIAA) during the 1954 college football season. In their tenth season under head coach Herman Riddick, the Eagles compiled a 7–1–1 record (6–0–1 against conference opponents), defeated Tennessee State in the National Classic, and outscored all opponents by a total of 180 to 57. The Eagles were recognized as a 1954 black college national co-champion.

== Schedule ==
Date	Time	Opponent	Site	Result	Attendance	Source
September 25		St. Augustine's	O'Kelly Field; Durham, NC	W 25–0		
October 2		at Hampton	Armstrong Stadium; Hampton, VA	W 28–0		
October 16		at Virginia State	Rogers Stadium; Ettrick, VA	W 12–6	2,500	
October 23		Maryland State^{†}	O'Kelly Field; Durham, NC	T 7–7	8,000	
October 30		at Tennessee A&I*	Hale Stadium; Nashville, TN	L 3–13		
November 6		at Johnson C. Smith	Senior High Stadium; Charlotte, NC	W 38–6		
November 13		West Virginia State	O'Kelly Field; Durham, NC	W 40–13	3,500	
November 25		North Carolina A&T	O'Kelly Field; Durham, NC (rivalry)	W 7–6		
December 4	2:00 p.m.	vs. Tennessee A&I*	World War Memorial Stadium; Greensboro, NC (National Classic)	W 19–6	2,500	
*Non-conference game; ^{†}Homecoming; All times are in Eastern time
