= 1954 North Dakota State Bison football team =

American college football season

1954 North Dakota State Bison football
- Conference: North Central Conference
- Record: 1–7–1 (1–4–1 NCC)
- Head coach: Del Anderson (1st season)
- Home stadium: Dacotah Field

1954 North Central Conference football standings
| | Conf. | | | | | Overall |
| Team | W | | L | | T | W | | L | | T |
|---|---|---|---|---|---|---|---|---|---|---|
| South Dakota State + | 5 | – | 1 | – | 0 | 7 | – | 2 | – | 0 |
| Morningside + | 5 | – | 1 | – | 0 | 5 | – | 3 | – | 0 |
| South Dakota | 3 | – | 3 | – | 0 | 5 | – | 4 | – | 0 |
| North Dakota | 3 | – | 3 | – | 0 | 4 | – | 5 | – | 0 |
| Iowa State Teachers | 3 | – | 3 | – | 0 | 3 | – | 5 | – | 0 |
| North Dakota State | 1 | – | 4 | – | 1 | 1 | – | 7 | – | 1 |
| Augustana (SD) | 0 | – | 5 | – | 1 | 1 | – | 7 | – | 1 |
+ – Conference co-champions

The 1954 North Dakota State Bison football team was an American football team that represented North Dakota State University during the 1954 college football season as a member of the North Central Conference. In their first year under head coach Del Anderson, the team compiled a 1–7–1 record.

== Schedule ==
| Date | Opponent | Site | Result | Attendance | Source |
|---|---|---|---|---|---|
| September 11 | Concordia–Moorhead* | Dacotah Field; Fargo, ND | L 0–12 | | |
| September 17 | Augustana (SD) | Dacotah Field; Fargo, ND | T 6–6 | | |
| September 25 | at Iowa State Teachers | O. R. Latham Stadium; Cedar Falls, IA | L 0–39 | 6,000 | |
| October 8 | Morningside | Dacotah Field; Fargo, ND | W 41–27 | | |
| October 16 | South Dakota State^{†} | Dacotah Field; Fargo, ND (rivalry) | L 13–50 | 4,500 | |
| October 22 | at Wayne* | Tartar Field; Detroit, MI | L 0–39 | 647 | |
| October 30 | at North Dakota | Memorial Stadium; Grand Forks, ND (Nickel Trophy) | L 7–40 | | |
| November 6 | at Wichita* | Veterans Field; Wichita, KS | L 0–59 | 9,707 | |
| November 13 | at South Dakota | Inman Field; Vermillion, SD | L 20–52 | | |
*Non-conference game; ^{†}Homecoming
