= 1954 Eastern Illinois Panthers football team =

American college football season

1954 Eastern Illinois Panthers football
- Conference: Interstate Intercollegiate Athletic Conference
- Record: 2–6–1 (1–4–1 IIAC)
- Head coach: Maynard O'Brien (8th season)
- Home stadium: Lincoln Field

1954 Interstate Intercollegiate Athletic Conference football standings
	Conf.					Overall
Team	W		L		T	W		L		T
Michigan State Normal +	5	–	1	–	0	8	–	1	–	0
Central Michigan +	5	–	1	–	0	8	–	2	–	0
Western Illinois	3	–	1	–	2	6	–	1	–	3
Illinois State Normal	3	–	2	–	1	5	–	3	–	1
Eastern Illinois	1	–	4	–	1	2	–	6	–	1
Southern Illinois	1	–	5	–	0	2	–	7	–	0
Northern Illinois State	1	–	5	–	0	2	–	7	–	0
+ – Conference co-champions

The 1954 Eastern Illinois Panthers football team represented Eastern Illinois State College (now known as Eastern Illinois University) as a member of the Interstate Intercollegiate Athletic Conference (IIAC) during the 1954 college football season. The team was led by eighth-year head coach Maynard O'Brien and played their home games at Lincoln Field in Charleston, Illinois. The Panthers finished the season with a 2–6–1 record overall and a 1–4–1 record in conference play, finishing fifth in the IIAC.

== Schedule ==
Date	Opponent	Site	Result	Attendance	Source
September 18	Indiana State*	Lincoln Field; Charleston, IL	L 7–40		
September 25	at Kalamazoo*	Kalamazoo, MI	L 7–19		
October 2	Central Michigan	Lincoln Field; Charleston, IL	L 0–60	1,200	
October 9	at Michigan State Normal	Briggs Field; Ypsilanti, MI	L 0–33		
October 23	Navy Pier*	Lincoln Field; Charleston, IL	W 40–6		
October 30	Southern Illinois^{†}	Lincoln Field; Charleston, IL	L 6–20	3,000	
November 6	at Western Illinois	Hanson Field; Macomb, IL	T 13–13		
November 13	Illinois State Normal	Lincoln Field; Charleston, IL (rivalry)	L 7–13		
November 20	at Northern Illinois State	Glidden Field; DeKalb, IL	W 28–9		
*Non-conference game; ^{†}Homecoming
