= 1954 Northern Illinois State Huskies football team =

American college football season

1954 Northern Illinois State Huskies football
- Conference: Interstate Intercollegiate Athletic Conference
- Record: 2–7 (1–5 IIAC)
- Head coach: Chick Evans (26th season)
- MVP: Ralph Krupke
- Captain: John Smith
- Home stadium: Glidden Field

1954 Interstate Intercollegiate Athletic Conference football standings
	Conf.					Overall
Team	W		L		T	W		L		T
Michigan State Normal +	5	–	1	–	0	8	–	1	–	0
Central Michigan +	5	–	1	–	0	8	–	2	–	0
Western Illinois	3	–	1	–	2	6	–	1	–	3
Illinois State Normal	3	–	2	–	1	5	–	3	–	1
Eastern Illinois	1	–	4	–	1	2	–	6	–	1
Southern Illinois	1	–	5	–	0	2	–	7	–	0
Northern Illinois State	1	–	5	–	0	2	–	7	–	0
+ – Conference co-champions

The 1954 Northern Illinois State Huskies football team represented Northern Illinois State Teachers College—now known as Northern Illinois University—as a member of the Interstate Intercollegiate Athletic Conference (IIAC) during the 1954 college football season. Led by Chick Evans in his 26th and final season as head coach, the Huskies compiled an overall record of 2–7 with a mark of 1–5 in conference play, tying for sixth in the IIAC. The team played home games at the 5,500-seat Glidden Field, located on the east end of campus, in DeKalb, Illinois.

== Schedule ==
Date	Opponent	Site	Result	Attendance	Source
September 25	Wheaton (IL)*	Wheaton, IL	L 8–13		
October 2	at Beloit*	Beloit, WI	W 18–0		
October 9	Southern Illinois	Glidden Field; DeKalb, IL	W 24–7	4,000	
October 16	at Michigan State Normal	Briggs Field; Ypsilanti, MI	L 0–34		
October 23	at Illinois State Normal	McCormick Field; Normal, IL	L 6–19	5,500	
October 30	Omaha*^{†}	Glidden Field; DeKalb, IL	L 7–26	4,000	
November 6	Central Michigan	Glidden Field; DeKalb, IL	L 7–46		
November 13	at Western Illinois	Hanson Field; Macomb, IL	L 0–14		
November 20	Eastern Illinois	Glidden Field; DeKalb, IL	L 9–28		
*Non-conference game; ^{†}Homecoming
