= 1954 Southern Illinois Salukis football team =

American college football season

1954 Southern Illinois Salukis football
- Conference: Interstate Intercollegiate Athletic Conference
- Record: 2–7 (1–5 IIAC)
- Head coach: William O'Brien (3rd season)
- Home stadium: McAndrew Stadium

1954 Interstate Intercollegiate Athletic Conference football standings
	Conf.					Overall
Team	W		L		T	W		L		T
Michigan State Normal +	5	–	1	–	0	8	–	1	–	0
Central Michigan +	5	–	1	–	0	8	–	2	–	0
Western Illinois	3	–	1	–	2	6	–	1	–	3
Illinois State Normal	3	–	2	–	1	5	–	3	–	1
Eastern Illinois	1	–	4	–	1	2	–	6	–	1
Southern Illinois	1	–	5	–	0	2	–	7	–	0
Northern Illinois State	1	–	5	–	0	2	–	7	–	0
+ – Conference co-champions

The 1954 Southern Illinois Salukis football team was an American football team that represented Southern Illinois University (now known as Southern Illinois University Carbondale) in the Interstate Intercollegiate Athletic Conference (IIAC) during the 1954 college football season. Under third-year head coach William O'Brien, the team compiled a 2–7 record. The team played its home games at McAndrew Stadium in Carbondale, Illinois.

== Schedule ==
Date	Opponent	Site	Result	Attendance	Source
September 25	Southeast Missouri State*	McAndrew Stadium; Carbondale, IL	L 6–7	6,000	
October 2	Illinois State Normal	McAndrew Stadium; Carbondale, IL	L 2–7	3,000	
October 9	at Northern Illinois State	Glidden Field; DeKalb, IL	L 7–24		
October 16	at Central Michigan	Alumni Field; Mount Pleasant, MI	L 0–33	3,000	
October 23	Michigan State Normal^{†}	McAndrew Stadium; Carbondale, IL	L 0–20	6,500	
October 30	at Eastern Illinois	Lincoln Field; Charleston, IL	W 20–6	3,000	
November 6	at Missouri Mines*	Rolla, MO	W 27–13		
November 13	Washington University*	McAndrew Stadium; Carbondale, IL	L 14–25	4,500	
November 20	Western Illinois	McAndrew Stadium; Carbondale, IL	L 17–19		
*Non-conference game; ^{†}Homecoming

== NFL draft ==
The following Saluki was selected in the 1955 NFL draft following the season.

Round	Pick	Player	Position	NFL team
28	326	Bob Ems	Back	Chicago Cardinals
