= 1954 Delaware State Hornets football team =

American college football season

1954 Delaware State Hornets football
- Conference: Central Intercollegiate Athletic Association
- Record: 7–1 (5–1 CIAA)
- Head coach: Edward L. Jackson (6th season)

1954 Central Intercollegiate Athletic Association football standings
	Conf.					Overall
Team	W		L		T	W		L		T
No. 5 North Carolina College $	6	–	0	–	1	7	–	1	–	1
No. 6 Maryland State	5	–	0	–	1	6	–	1	–	1
No. 8 Virginia State	7	–	1	–	0	7	–	2	–	0
No. 10 Bluefield State	6	–	1	–	0	8	–	2	–	0
No. 18 St. Augustine's	6	–	2	–	0	6	–	3	–	0
Delaware State	5	–	1	–	0	7	–	1	–	0
No. 12 Virginia Union	5	–	3	–	0	5	–	3	–	0
No. 23 Morgan State	4	–	2	–	0	6	–	3	–	0
Hampton	4	–	5	–	1	4	–	5	–	1
Lincoln (PA)	3	–	3	–	0	4	–	3	–	1
No. 24 North Carolina A&T	2	–	5	–	0	4	–	6	–	0
Winston-Salem State	2	–	5	–	0	3	–	5	–	0
Johnson C. Smith	1	–	4	–	1	1	–	5	–	2
West Virginia State	1	–	5	–	0	3	–	6	–	0
Fayetteville State	1	–	5	–	0	3	–	6	–	0
Saint Paul's (VA)	1	–	6	–	0	2	–	6	–	0
Howard	0	–	5	–	1	2	–	6	–	1
Shaw	0	–	6	–	1	0	–	7	–	1
$ – Conference champion; Rankings from Associated Negro Press

The 1954 Delaware State Hornets football team represented Delaware State College—now known as Delaware State University—as a member of the Central Intercollegiate Athletic Association (CIAA) in the 1954 college football season. Led by coach Edward L. Jackson, the Hornets compiled a 7–1 record, just two seasons after posting a 1–7 record. They shut out their first four opponents, only allowing Lincoln, St. Paul's, and St. Augustine's to score any points. They maintained a perfect record until the final game of the season, losing 6–12 vs. St. Augustine's. The team had 40 members, a fifth of the entire 1954 enrollment at DSU.

== Schedule ==
Date	Opponent	Site	Result	Source
September 25	at Cheyney*	Cheyney, PA	W 25–0	
October 1	at Norfolk State*	Norfolk, VA	W 7–0	
October 9	Hampton	Dover, DE	W 6–0	
October 16	Johnson C. Smith	Dover, DE	W 13–0	
October 23	at Lincoln (PA)	Oxford, PA	W 18–13	
October 30	Saint Paul's (VA)	Dover, DE	W 26–6	
November 13	Howard	Dover, DE	W 13–0	
November 20	at St. Augustine's	Raleigh, NC	L 6–12	
*Non-conference game
