= 1954 South Dakota State Jackrabbits football team =

American college football season

1954 South Dakota State Jackrabbits football

NCC co-champion
- Conference: North Central Conference
- Record: 7–2 (5–1 NCC)
- Head coach: Ralph Ginn (8th season)
- Captains: Jerry Welch; Jack Nitz
- Home stadium: State Field

1954 North Central Conference football standings
| | Conf. | | | | | Overall |
| Team | W | | L | | T | W | | L | | T |
|---|---|---|---|---|---|---|---|---|---|---|
| South Dakota State + | 5 | – | 1 | – | 0 | 7 | – | 2 | – | 0 |
| Morningside + | 5 | – | 1 | – | 0 | 5 | – | 3 | – | 0 |
| South Dakota | 3 | – | 3 | – | 0 | 5 | – | 4 | – | 0 |
| North Dakota | 3 | – | 3 | – | 0 | 4 | – | 5 | – | 0 |
| Iowa State Teachers | 3 | – | 3 | – | 0 | 3 | – | 5 | – | 0 |
| North Dakota State | 1 | – | 4 | – | 1 | 1 | – | 7 | – | 1 |
| Augustana (SD) | 0 | – | 5 | – | 1 | 1 | – | 7 | – | 1 |
+ – Conference co-champions

The 1954 South Dakota State Jackrabbits football team was an American football team that represented South Dakota State University in the North Central Conference (NCC) during the 1954 college football season. In its eighth season under head coach Ralph Ginn, the team compiled a 7–2 record, tied for the conference championship, and outscored opponents by a total of 338 to 151.

The team's statistical leaders included quarterback Jerry Welch with 625 rushing yards and 478 passing yards. Other key players included center Herb Backlund, tackle Jack Nitz, guard Roger Kerns, and back Roger Denker.

== Schedule ==
| Date | Opponent | Site | Result | Attendance | Source |
|---|---|---|---|---|---|
| September 18 | at Iowa State* | Clyde Williams Field; Ames, IA | L 6–34 | | |
| September 25 | at St. Thomas (MN)* | O'Shaughnessy Stadium; St. Paul, MN | W 19–6 | | |
| October 1 | Mankato State* | State Field; Brookings, SD | W 66–0 | | |
| October 9 | Augustana (SD) | State Field; Brookings, SD | W 68–0 | | |
| October 16 | at North Dakota State | Dacotah Field; Fargo, ND (rivalry) | W 50–13 | 4,500 | |
| October 23 | North Dakota^{†} | State Field; Brookings, SD | W 34–20 | 10,000 | |
| October 30 | at South Dakota | Inman Field; Vermillion, SD (rivalry) | W 20–19 | 8,000 | |
| November 5 | Morningside | State Field; Brookings, SD | L 34–39 | | |
| November 13 | at Iowa State Teachers | Cedar Falls, IA | W 41–20 | | |
*Non-conference game; ^{†}Homecoming
