= 1954 Langston Lions football team =

American college football season

1954 Langston Lions football
- Conference: Southwestern Athletic Conference
- Record: 4–4–1 (4–2 SWAC)
- Head coach: Caesar Felton Gayles (25th season)
- Home stadium: Anderson Field

1954 Southwestern Athletic Conference football standings
	Conf.					Overall
Team	W		L		T	W		L		T
No. 3 Prairie View A&M $	6	–	0	–	0	10	–	1	–	0
No. 4 Southern	5	–	1	–	0	10	–	1	–	0
Langston	4	–	2	–	0	4	–	4	–	1
Texas College	3	–	3	–	0	4	–	6	–	0
Wiley	2	–	4	–	0	5	–	5	–	0
Arkansas AM&N	1	–	5	–	0	2	–	7	–	2
Bishop	0	–	6	–	0	1	–	7	–	0
$ – Conference champion; Rankings from Associated Negro Press

The 1954 Langston Lions football team represented Langston University as a member of the Southwestern Athletic Conference (SWAC) during the 1954 college football season. Led by 25th-year head coach Caesar Felton Gayles, the Lions compiled an overall record of 4–4–1, with a conference record of 4–2, and finished third in the SWAC.

== Schedule ==
Date	Opponent	Site	Result	Attendance	Source
September 25	Bishop	Anderson Field; Langston, OK	W 33–0		
October 2	at Tennessee A&I*	Hale Stadium; Nashville, TN	L 0–14		
October 9	Texas College	Anderson Field; Langston, OK	W 13–12		
October 16	vs. Lincoln (MO)*	Blues Stadium; Kansas City, MO	T 6–6	6,000	
October 23	at Southern	University Stadium; Baton Rouge, LA	L 6–25		
October 30	vs. Texas Southern*	Public School Stadium; Galveston, TX	L 13–20		
November 6	at Wiley	Wiley Field; Marshall, TX	W 7–0		
November 13	Arkansas AM&N	Anderson Field; Langston, OK	W 23–6	4,000	
November 20	Prairie View A&M	Anderson Field; Langston, OK	L 14–19		
*Non-conference game
