= 1954 Western Illinois Leathernecks football team =

American college football season

1954 Western Illinois Leathernecks football
- Conference: Interstate Intercollegiate Athletic Conference
- Record: 6–1–3 (3–1–2 IIAC)
- Head coach: Wes Stevens (1st season)
- Home stadium: Hanson Field

1954 Interstate Intercollegiate Athletic Conference football standings
	Conf.					Overall
Team	W		L		T	W		L		T
Michigan State Normal +	5	–	1	–	0	8	–	1	–	0
Central Michigan +	5	–	1	–	0	8	–	2	–	0
Western Illinois	3	–	1	–	2	6	–	1	–	3
Illinois State Normal	3	–	2	–	1	5	–	3	–	1
Eastern Illinois	1	–	4	–	1	2	–	6	–	1
Southern Illinois	1	–	5	–	0	2	–	7	–	0
Northern Illinois State	1	–	5	–	0	2	–	7	–	0
+ – Conference co-champions

The 1954 Western Illinois Leathernecks football team represented Western Illinois University as a member of the Interstate Intercollegiate Athletic Conference (IIAC) during the 1954 college football season. They were led by first-year head coach Wes Stevens and played their home games at Hanson Field. The Leathernecks finished the season with a 6–1–3 record overall and a 3–1–2 record in conference play, placing third in the IIAC.

== Schedule ==
Date	Opponent	Site	Result	Attendance	Source
September 16	Loras*	Hanson Field; Macomb, IL	W 38–6		
September 24	at St. Ambrose*	Davenport Municipal Stadium; Davenport, IA	W 26–18		
October 2	at Bradley*	Peoria Stadium; Peoria, IL	T 7–7		
October 7	Lewis*	Hanson Field; Macomb, IL	W 7–6		
October 16	at Illinois State Normal	McCormick Field; Normal, IL	T 13–13		
October 23	Central Michigan	Hanson Field; Macomb, IL	W 14–7	10,000	
October 30	at Michigan State Normal	Briggs Field; Ypsilanti, MI	L 19–33	5,100	
November 6	Eastern Illinois	Hanson Field; Macomb, IL	T 13–13		
November 13	Northern Illinois State	Hanson Field; Macomb, IL	W 14–0		
November 20	at Southern Illinois	McAndrew Stadium; Carbondale, IL	W 19–17		
*Non-conference game
