= 1954 Texas Southern Tigers football team =

American college football season

1954 Texas Southern Tigers football

Prairie View Bowl, L 12–14 vs. Prairie View A&M
- Conference: Midwest Athletic Association
- Record: 5–4–2 (2–1–1 MWAA)
- Head coach: Alexander Durley (6th season)
- Home stadium: Public School Stadium

1954 Midwest Athletic Association football standings
	Conf.					Overall
Team	W		L		T	W		L		T
No. 1 Tennessee A&I $	4	–	0	–	0	10	–	1	–	0
No. 22 Grambling	1	–	0	–	1	4	–	3	–	2
No. 13 Texas Southern	2	–	1	–	1	5	–	4	–	2
No. 16 Lincoln (MO)	3	–	2	–	0	4	–	3	–	1
No. 19 Central State (OH)	1	–	2	–	0	4	–	4	–	0
No. 20 Kentucky State	1	–	3	–	0	5	–	3	–	0
Jackson	0	–	4	–	0	1	–	7	–	0
$ – Conference champion; Rankings from Associated Negro Press

The 1954 Texas Southern Tigers football team was an American football team that represented Texas Southern University as a member of the Midwest Athletic Association (MWAA) during the 1954 college football season. Led by sixth-year head coach Alexander Durley, the Tigers compiled an overall record of 5–4–2, with a mark of 2–1–1 in the MWAA.

== Schedule ==
Date	Opponent	Site	Result	Attendance	Source
September 20	Paul Quinn*	Public School Stadium; Houston, TX	L 12–14		
September 25	Southern*	Public School Stadium; Houston, TX	L 6–26		
October 2	at Texas College*	Steer Stadium; Tyler, TX	W 15–7	3,000	
October 9	Grambling	Public School Stadium; Houston, TX	T 19–19		
October 16	at Jackson	Alumni Field; Jackson, MS	W 22–7		
October 23	Lincoln (MO)	Public School Stadium; Houston, TX	W 47–12	4,000	
October 30	vs. Langston*	Public School Stadium; Galveston, TX	W 20–13		
November 6	Tennessee A&I	Public School Stadium; Houston, TX	L 15–18		
November 13	at Alcorn A&M*	Henderson Stadium; Lorman, MS	T 6–6		
November 25	at Arkansas AM&N*	Pumphrey Stadium; Pine Bluff, AR	W 14–8		
January 1, 1955	vs. Prairie View A&M*	Public School Stadium; Houston, TX (Prairie View Bowl)	L 12–14	10,000	
*Non-conference game
