= 1954 South Dakota Coyotes football team =

American college football season

1954 South Dakota Coyotes football
- Conference: North Central Conference
- Record: 5–4 (3–3 NCC)
- Head coach: Harry Gamage (16th season)
- Home stadium: Inman Field

1954 North Central Conference football standings
	Conf.					Overall
Team	W		L		T	W		L		T
South Dakota State +	5	–	1	–	0	7	–	2	–	0
Morningside +	5	–	1	–	0	5	–	3	–	0
South Dakota	3	–	3	–	0	5	–	4	–	0
North Dakota	3	–	3	–	0	4	–	5	–	0
Iowa State Teachers	3	–	3	–	0	3	–	5	–	0
North Dakota State	1	–	4	–	1	1	–	7	–	1
Augustana (SD)	0	–	5	–	1	1	–	7	–	1
+ – Conference co-champions

The 1954 South Dakota Coyotes football team was an American football team that represented the University of South Dakota as a member of the North Central Conference (NCC) during the 1954 college football season. In their 16th season under head coach Harry Gamage, the Coyotes compiled a 5–4 record (3–3 against NCC opponents), tied for fifth place out of seven teams in the NCC, and were outscored by a total of 149 to 115. They played their home games at Inman Field in Vermillion, South Dakota.

== Schedule ==
Date	Opponent	Site	Result	Attendance	Source
September 25	at South Dakota Mines*	Rapid City, SD	W 38–0		
October 2	Augustana (SD)	Inman Field; Vermillion, SD	W 33–6		
October 9	at North Dakota	Memorial Stadium; Grand Forks, ND (Sitting Bull Trophy)	L 21–27		
October 16	Drake*	Inman Field; Vermillion, SD	W 33–26	3,500	
October 23	at Morningside	Public Schools Stadium; Sioux City, IA	L 7–41	8,000	
October 30	South Dakota State	Inman Field; Vermillion, SD (rivalry)	L 19–20	8,000	
November 6	at Iowa State Teachers	O. R. Latham Field; Cedar Falls, IA	W 34–33	3,400	
November 13	North Dakota State	Inman Field; Vermillion, SD	W 52–20		
November 20	at Austin (TX)*	Sherman, TX	L 6–41		
*Non-conference game
