= 1954 Texas College Steers football team =

American college football season

1954 Texas College Steers football
- Conference: Southwestern Athletic Conference
- Record: 4–6 (3–3 SWAC)
- Head coach: Fred T. Long (6th season)
- Home stadium: Steer Stadium

1954 Southwestern Athletic Conference football standings
	Conf.					Overall
Team	W		L		T	W		L		T
No. 3 Prairie View A&M $	6	–	0	–	0	10	–	1	–	0
No. 4 Southern	5	–	1	–	0	10	–	1	–	0
Langston	4	–	2	–	0	4	–	4	–	1
Texas College	3	–	3	–	0	4	–	6	–	0
Wiley	2	–	4	–	0	5	–	5	–	0
Arkansas AM&N	1	–	5	–	0	2	–	7	–	2
Bishop	0	–	6	–	0	1	–	7	–	0
$ – Conference champion; Rankings from Associated Negro Press

The 1954 Texas College Steers football team represented Texas College as a member of the Southwestern Athletic Conference (SWAC) during the 1954 college football season. Led by sixth-year head coach Fred T. Long, the Steers compiled an overall record of 4–6, and a mark of 3–3 in conference play, and finished fourth in the SWAC.

== Schedule ==
Date	Opponent	Site	Result	Source
September 25	at Florida A&M*	Bragg Stadium; Tallahassee, FL	L 14–39	
October 2	Texas Southern*	Steer Stadium; Tyler, TX	L 7–15	
October 9	at Langston	Anderson Field; Langston, OK	L 12–13	
October 16	Alcorn A&M*	Steer Stadium; Tyler, TX	L 12–13	
October 23	at Paul Quinn*	Jackson Field; Waco, TX	W 13–0	
October 30	Southern	Steer Stadium; Tyler, TX	L 25–41	
November 6	at Prairie View	Blackshear Field; Prairie View, TX	L 6–19	
November 13	at Bishop	Tiger Stadium; Marshall, TX	W 32–13	
November 25	Wiley	Steer Stadium; Tyler, TX	W 26–0	
December 4	vs. Arkansas AM&N	State Fair Stadium; Shreveport, LA	W 28–9	
*Non-conference game
