= 1954 Prairie View A&M Panthers football team =

American college football season

1954 Prairie View A&M Panthers football

Black college national champion SWAC champion

Prairie View Bowl, W 14–12 vs. Texas Southern
- Conference: Southwestern Athletic Conference
- Record: 10–1 (6–0 SWAC)
- Head coach: Billy Nicks (6th season)

1954 Southwestern Athletic Conference football standings
	Conf.					Overall
Team	W		L		T	W		L		T
No. 3 Prairie View A&M $	6	–	0	–	0	10	–	1	–	0
No. 4 Southern	5	–	1	–	0	10	–	1	–	0
Langston	4	–	2	–	0	4	–	4	–	1
Texas College	3	–	3	–	0	4	–	6	–	0
Wiley	2	–	4	–	0	5	–	5	–	0
Arkansas AM&N	1	–	5	–	0	2	–	7	–	2
Bishop	0	–	6	–	0	1	–	7	–	0
$ – Conference champion; Rankings from Associated Negro Press

The 1954 Prairie View A&M Panthers football team was an American football team that represented Prairie View A&M University in the Southwestern Athletic Conference (SWAC) during the 1954 college football season. In their sixth season under head coach Billy Nicks, the Panthers compiled a perfect 10–1 record (6–0 against conference opponents), won the SWAC championship, defeated Texas Southern in the Prairie View Bowl, and outscored opponents by a total of 255 to 116. The Panthers were recognized as a 1953 black college national co-champion.

== Schedule ==
Date	Opponent	Site	Result	Source
September 17	Fort Hood*	Fort Hood Stadium; Fort Hood, TX	W 26–21	
October 2	Bishop	Blackshear Field; Prairie View, TX	W 53–0	
October 9	at Jackson*	Alumni Field; Jackson, MS	W 26–6	
October 18	vs. Wiley	Cotton Bowl; Dallas, TX (State Fair Classic)	W 19–6	
October 23	Florida A&M*	Blackshear Field; Prairie View, TX	L 7–19	
October 30	Arkansas AM&N	Blackshear Field; Prairie View, TX	W 26–0	
November 6	Texas College	Blackshear Field; Prairie View, TX	W 19–6	
November 13	at Grambling*	Tiger Stadium; Grambling, LA	W 26–19	
November 20	at Langston	Anderson Stadium; Langston, OK	W 19–14	
November 27	Southern	Blackshear Field; Prairie View, TX	W 20–13	
January 1, 1955	at Texas Southern	Public School Stadium; Houston, TX (Prairie View Bowl, rivalry)	W 14–12	
*Non-conference game
