= 1954 Wiley Wildcats football team =

American college football season

1954 Wiley Wildcats football
- Conference: Southwestern Athletic Conference
- Record: 5–5 (2–4 SWAC)
- Head coach: Alva Tabor (1st season)
- Home stadium: Wiley Field

1954 Southwestern Athletic Conference football standings
	Conf.					Overall
Team	W		L		T	W		L		T
No. 3 Prairie View A&M $	6	–	0	–	0	10	–	1	–	0
No. 4 Southern	5	–	1	–	0	10	–	1	–	0
Langston	4	–	2	–	0	4	–	4	–	1
Texas College	3	–	3	–	0	4	–	6	–	0
Wiley	2	–	4	–	0	5	–	5	–	0
Arkansas AM&N	1	–	5	–	0	2	–	7	–	2
Bishop	0	–	6	–	0	1	–	7	–	0
$ – Conference champion; Rankings from Associated Negro Press

The 1954 Wiley Wildcats football team represented Wiley College as a member of the Southwestern Athletic Conference (SWAC) during the 1954 college football season. Led by first-year head coach Alva Tabor, the Wildcats compiled an overall record of 5–5, with a conference record of 2–4, and finished fifth in the SWAC.

== Schedule ==
Date	Opponent	Site	Result	Source
September 25	at Philander Smith*	War Memorial Stadium; Little Rock, AR	W 58–0	
October 2	at Dillard*	Dillard Stadium; New Orleans, LA	W 19–13	
October 9	vs. Arkansas AM&N	Bishop Bryan Shamrock Stadium; Port Arthur, TX	W 26–13	
October 18	vs. Prairie View A&M	Cotton Bowl; Dallas, TX (State Fair Classic)	L 6–19	
October 25	vs. Grambling*	State Fair Stadium; Shreveport, LA	L 12–35	
October 30	Bishop	Wiley Field; Marshall, TX	W 19–0	
November 6	Langston	Wiley Field; Marshall, TX	L 0–7	
November 13	Southern	University Stadium; Baton Rouge, LA	L 19–33	
November 20	Paul Quinn*	Wiley Field; Marshall, TX	W 40–0	
November 25	at Texas College	Steer Stadium; Tyler, TX	L 0–26	
*Non-conference game
