= 1954 Illinois State Normal Redbirds football team =

American college football season

1954 Illinois State Normal Redbirds football
- Conference: Interstate Intercollegiate Athletic Conference
- Record: 5–3–1 (3–2–1 IIAC)
- Head coach: Edwin Struck (10th season)
- MVP: Bob Riggenbach
- Captains: Lloyd Atterberry; Roger Francour
- Home stadium: McCormick Field

1954 Interstate Intercollegiate Athletic Conference football standings
| | Conf. | | | | | Overall |
| Team | W | | L | | T | W | | L | | T |
|---|---|---|---|---|---|---|---|---|---|---|
| Michigan State Normal + | 5 | – | 1 | – | 0 | 8 | – | 1 | – | 0 |
| Central Michigan + | 5 | – | 1 | – | 0 | 8 | – | 2 | – | 0 |
| Western Illinois | 3 | – | 1 | – | 2 | 6 | – | 1 | – | 3 |
| Illinois State Normal | 3 | – | 2 | – | 1 | 5 | – | 3 | – | 1 |
| Eastern Illinois | 1 | – | 4 | – | 1 | 2 | – | 6 | – | 1 |
| Southern Illinois | 1 | – | 5 | – | 0 | 2 | – | 7 | – | 0 |
| Northern Illinois State | 1 | – | 5 | – | 0 | 2 | – | 7 | – | 0 |
+ – Conference co-champions

The 1954 Illinois State Normal Redbirds football team represented Illinois State Normal University—now known as Illinois State University—as a member of the Interstate Intercollegiate Athletic Conference (IIAC) during the 1954 college football season. Led by tenth-year head coach Edwin Struck, the Redbirds compiled an overall record of 5–3–1 with a mark of 3–2–1 in conference play, placing fourth in the IIAC. Illinois State Normal played home games at McCormick Field in Normal, Illinois.

== Schedule ==
| Date | Opponent | Site | Result | Attendance | Source |
|---|---|---|---|---|---|
| September 24 | Bradley* | McCormick Field; Normal, IL | L 13–34 | | |
| October 2 | at Southern Illinois | McAndrew Stadium; Carbondale, IL | W 7–2 | 3,000 | |
| October 9 | Beloit* | McCormick Field; Normal, IL | W 14–7 | | |
| October 16 | Western Illinois | McCormick Field; Normal, IL | T 13–13 | | |
| October 23 | Northern Illinois State^{†} | McCormick Field; Normal, IL | W 19–6 | 5,500 | |
| October 30 | at Central Michigan | Alumni Field; Mount Pleasant, MI | L 0–26 | | |
| November 6 | Michigan State Normal | McCormick Field; Normal, IL | L 7–25 | | |
| November 13 | at Eastern Illinois | Lincoln Field; Charleston, IL (rivalry) | W 13–7 | | |
| November 20 | at Illinois Wesleyan* | Wesleyan Stadium; Bloomington, IL | W 27–7 | | |
*Non-conference game; ^{†}Homecoming
