= 1954 Grambling Tigers football team =

American college football season

1954 Grambling Tigers football
- Conference: Midwest Athletic Association
- Record: 4–3–2 (1–0–1 MWAA)
- Head coach: Eddie Robinson (12th season)
- Home stadium: Tiger Stadium

1954 Midwest Athletic Association football standings
	Conf.					Overall
Team	W		L		T	W		L		T
No. 1 Tennessee A&I $	4	–	0	–	0	10	–	1	–	0
No. 22 Grambling	1	–	0	–	1	4	–	3	–	2
No. 13 Texas Southern	2	–	1	–	1	5	–	4	–	2
No. 16 Lincoln (MO)	3	–	2	–	0	4	–	3	–	1
No. 19 Central State (OH)	1	–	2	–	0	4	–	4	–	0
No. 20 Kentucky State	1	–	3	–	0	5	–	3	–	0
Jackson	0	–	4	–	0	1	–	7	–	0
$ – Conference champion; Rankings from Associated Negro Press

The 1954 Grambling Tigers football team represented Grambling College (now known as Grambling State University) as a member of the Midwest Athletic Association (MWAA) during the 1954 college football season. Led by 12th-year head coach Eddie Robinson, the Tigers compiled an overall record of 4–3–2 and a mark of 1–0–1 in conference play.

== Schedule ==
Date	Opponent	Site	Result	Source
September 17	at Paul Quinn*	Jackson Memorial Stadium; Waco, TX	T 0–0	
September 26	Alcorn A&M*	Tiger Stadium; Grambling, LA	L 6–26	
October 9	at Texas Southern	Public School Stadium; Houston, TX	T 19–19	
October 16	Bishop*	Tiger Stadium; Grambling, LA	W 48–7	
October 25	vs. Wiley*	State Fair Stadium; Shreveport, LA	W 35–12	
October 30	Jackson^{†}	Tiger Stadium; Grambling, LA	W 44–12	
November 6	at Bethune–Cookman*	Municipal Stadium; Daytona Beach, FL	L 14–24	
November 13	Prairie View A&M*	Tiger Stadium; Grambling, LA	L 19–26	
November 20	at Arkansas AM&N*	Pumphrey Stadium; Pine Bluff, AR	W 21–13	
*Non-conference game; ^{†}Homecoming
