= 1954 Whitworth Pirates football team =

College football season

1954 Whitworth Pirates football

Evergreen champion
- Conference: Evergreen Conference
- Record: 8–0 (7–0 Evergreen)
- Head coach: James Lounsberry (3rd season)

1954 Evergreen Conference football standings
	Conf.					Overall
Team	W		L		T	W		L		T
Whitworth $	6	–	0	–	0	8	–	0	–	0
Puget Sound	5	–	1	–	0	6	–	2	–	0
Pacific Lutheran	4	–	2	–	0	5	–	3	–	0
Western Washington	3	–	3	–	0	3	–	5	–	0
Central Washington	2	–	4	–	0	2	–	6	–	0
Eastern Washington	1	–	5	–	0	1	–	8	–	0
UBC	0	–	6	–	0	?	–	?	–	?
$ – Conference champion

The 1954 Whitworth Pirates football team was an American football team that represented Whitworth University of Spokane, Washington, as a member of the Evergreen Conference during the 1954 college football season. In their third year under head coach James Lounsberry, the Pirates compiled a perfect 8–0 record (7–0 against conference opponents), won the Evergreen Conference championship, and outscored opponents by a total of 269 to 34.

Between November 14, 1953, and September 29, 1956, the Pirates won 21 consecutive games, including back-to-back perfect seasons in 1954 and 1955.

== Schedule ==
Date	Opponent	Site	Result	Attendance	Source
September 25	at Eastern Washington	Richland Bomber Bowwl; Richland, WA	W 27–0	3,000	
October 2	Western Washington	Memorial Stadium; Spokane, WA	W 33–0	4,000	
October 9	Central Washington	Memorial Stadium; Spokane, WA	W 15–6	3,500	
October 16	at Puget Sound	CPS athletic field; Tacoma, WA	W 33–13		
October 23	at UBC	UBC Stadium; Vancouver, BC	W 27–6	2,000	
October 30	Linfield*^{†}	Spokane, WA	W 41–7	4,000	
November 6	Pacific Lutheran	Memorial Stadium; Spokane, WA	W 38–2	4,500–5,000	
November 13	at Eastern Washington	Cheney, WA	W 55–0		
*Non-conference game; ^{†}Homecoming
