= 1954 Bishop Tigers football team =

American college football season

1954 Bishop Tigers football
- Conference: Southwestern Athletic Conference
- Record: 1–7 (0–6 SWAC)
- Head coach: Vincent M. Gaines (2nd season)
- Home stadium: Tiger Stadium

1954 Southwestern Athletic Conference football standings
	Conf.					Overall
Team	W		L		T	W		L		T
No. 3 Prairie View A&M $	6	–	0	–	0	10	–	1	–	0
No. 4 Southern	5	–	1	–	0	10	–	1	–	0
Langston	4	–	2	–	0	4	–	4	–	1
Texas College	3	–	3	–	0	4	–	6	–	0
Wiley	2	–	4	–	0	5	–	5	–	0
Arkansas AM&N	1	–	5	–	0	2	–	7	–	2
Bishop	0	–	6	–	0	1	–	7	–	0
$ – Conference champion; Rankings from Associated Negro Press

The 1954 Bishop Tigers football team represented Bishop College as a member of the Southwestern Athletic Conference (SWAC) during the 1954 college football season. Led by second-year head coach Vincent M. Gaines, the Tigers compiled an overall record of 1–7, with a conference record of 0–6, and finished seventh in the SWAC.

== Schedule ==
Date	Opponent	Site	Result	Source
September 18	Butler (TX)*	Tiger Stadium; Marshall, TX	W 27–0	
September 25	at Langston	Anderson Field; Langston, OK	L 0–33	
October 2	at Prairie View A&M	Blackshear Field; Prairie View, TX	L 0–53	
October 16	at Grambling*	Tiger Stadium; Grambling, LA	L 7–48	
October 23	at Arkansas AM&N	Pumphrey Stadium; Pine Bluff, AR	L 8–19	
October 30	at Wiley	Wiley Field; Marshall, TX	L 0–19	
November 6	at Southern	University Stadium; Baton Rouge, LA	L 0–77	
November 13	Texas College	Tiger Stadium; Marshall, TX	L 13–32	
November 25	at Paul Quinn*	Jackson Field; Waco, TX	Canceled	
*Non-conference game
