= 1954 North Dakota Fighting Sioux football team =

American college football season

1954 North Dakota Fighting Sioux football
- Conference: North Central Conference
- Record: 4–5 (3–3 NCC)
- Head coach: Frank Zazula (5th season)
- Home stadium: Memorial Stadium

1954 North Central Conference football standings
	Conf.					Overall
Team	W		L		T	W		L		T
South Dakota State +	5	–	1	–	0	7	–	2	–	0
Morningside +	5	–	1	–	0	5	–	3	–	0
South Dakota	3	–	3	–	0	5	–	4	–	0
North Dakota	3	–	3	–	0	4	–	5	–	0
Iowa State Teachers	3	–	3	–	0	3	–	5	–	0
North Dakota State	1	–	4	–	1	1	–	7	–	1
Augustana (SD)	0	–	5	–	1	1	–	7	–	1
+ – Conference co-champions

The 1954 North Dakota Fighting Sioux football team, also known as the Nodaks, was an American football team that represented the University of North Dakota in the North Central Conference (NCC) during the 1954 college football season. In its fifth year under head coach Frank Zazula, the team compiled a 4–5 record (3–3 against NCC opponents), tied for third place out of seven teams in the NCC, and outscored opponents by a total of 200 to 182. The team played its home games at Memorial Stadium in Grand Forks, North Dakota.

== Schedule ==
Date	Opponent	Site	Result	Attendance	Source
September 18	Bemidji State*	Memorial Stadium; Grand Forks, ND	W 27–12		
September 25	at Augustana (SD)	Sioux Falls, SD	W 39–0		
October 2	at Morningside	Public Schools Stadium; Sioux City, IA	L 21–28		
October 9	South Dakota	Memorial Stadium; Grand Forks, ND (Sitting Bull Trophy)	W 27–21		
October 16	Iowa State Teachers	Memorial Stadium; Grand Forks, ND	L 13–14		
October 23	at South Dakota State	Brookings, SD	L 20–34	10,000	
October 30	North Dakota State	Memorial Stadium; Grand Forks, ND	W 40–7		
November 6	at Montana State*	Gatton Field; Bozeman, MT	L 13–21		
November 13	at Idaho*	Neale Stadium; Moscow, ID	L 0–45	6,000	
*Non-conference game
