= 1954 Michigan State Normal Hurons football team =

American college football season

1954 Michigan State Normal Hurons football

IIAC co-champion
- Conference: Interstate Intercollegiate Athletic Conference
- Record: 8–1 (5–1 IIAC)
- Head coach: Fred Trosko (3rd season)
- MVP: Robert Middlekauf
- Captain: Nicholas Manych
- Home stadium: Briggs Field

1954 Interstate Intercollegiate Athletic Conference football standings
	Conf.					Overall
Team	W		L		T	W		L		T
Michigan State Normal +	5	–	1	–	0	8	–	1	–	0
Central Michigan +	5	–	1	–	0	8	–	2	–	0
Western Illinois	3	–	1	–	2	6	–	1	–	3
Illinois State Normal	3	–	2	–	1	5	–	3	–	1
Eastern Illinois	1	–	4	–	1	2	–	6	–	1
Southern Illinois	1	–	5	–	0	2	–	7	–	0
Northern Illinois State	1	–	5	–	0	2	–	7	–	0
+ – Conference co-champions

The 1954 Michigan State Normal Hurons football team represented Michigan State Normal College (renamed Eastern Michigan College in 1956 and Eastern Michigan University in 1959) in the Interstate Intercollegiate Athletic Conference (IIAC) during the 1954 college football season. In their third season under head coach Fred Trosko, the Hurons compiled an 8–1 record (5–1 against IIAC opponents), tied with Central Michigan for the IIAC championship, and outscored their opponents, 210 to 67. Nicholas Manych was the team captain. The Hurons lost to Central Michigan by a 28 to 7 score in the final game of the season, resulting in the two teams sharing the conference championship. Quarterback Bob Middlekauff led the team with 934 yards of total offense. Virgil Windom led the team with 530 rushing yards and in scoring with 11 touchdowns and 66 points. Middlekauf was also named MVP of the IIAC.

== Schedule ==
Date	Opponent	Site	Result	Attendance	Source
September 18	at Hope*	Riverview Park; Holland, MI	W 19–0	2,500	
September 25	Hillsdale*	Briggs Field; Ypsilanti, MI	W 32–13		
October 1	Wayne*	Briggs Field; Ypsilanti, MI	W 7–0	4,000	
October 9	Eastern Illinois	Briggs Field; Ypsilanti, MI	W 33–0		
October 16	at Northern Illinois State	Glidden Field; DeKalb, IL	W 34–0		
October 23	at Southern Illinois	McAndrew Stadium; Carbondale, IL	W 20–0	6,500	
October 30	Western Illinois^{†}	Briggs Field; Ypsilanti, MI	W 33–19	5,100	
November 6	at Illinois State Normal	McCormick Field; Normal, IL	W 25–7		
November 13	at Central Michigan	Mount Pleasant, MI (rivalry)	L 7–28		
*Non-conference game; ^{†}Homecoming

== After the season ==
The following Huron was selected in the 1955 NFL draft after the season.

Round	Pick	Player	Position	NFL club
21	243	Nick Manych	End	Baltimore Colts
