= 1954 Southern Jaguars football team =

American college football season

1954 Southern Jaguars football

Black college national co-champion
- Conference: Southwestern Athletic Conference
- Record: 10–1 (5–1 SWAC)
- Head coach: Ace Mumford (19th season)
- Home stadium: University Stadium

1954 Southwestern Athletic Conference football standings
	Conf.					Overall
Team	W		L		T	W		L		T
No. 3 Prairie View A&M $	6	–	0	–	0	10	–	1	–	0
No. 4 Southern	5	–	1	–	0	10	–	1	–	0
Langston	4	–	2	–	0	4	–	4	–	1
Texas College	3	–	3	–	0	4	–	6	–	0
Wiley	2	–	4	–	0	5	–	5	–	0
Arkansas AM&N	1	–	5	–	0	2	–	7	–	2
Bishop	0	–	6	–	0	1	–	7	–	0
$ – Conference champion; Rankings from Associated Negro Press

The 1954 Southern Jaguars football team was an American football team that represented Southern University in the 1954 college football season. In their 19th season under head coach Ace Mumford, the Jaguars compiled a 10–1 record (5–1 against SWAC opponents), finished second in the SWAC, and outscored all opponents by a total of 374 to 124. The team played its home games at University Stadium in Baton Rouge, Louisiana.

The team was recognized as the black college national co-champion.

== Schedule ==
Date	Opponent	Site	Result	Source
September 25	at Texas Southern	Public School Stadium; Houston, TX	W 26–6	
October 2	at Alcorn A&M*	Henderson Stadium; Lorman, MS	W 19–0	
October 9	Paul Quinn*	University Stadium; Baton Rouge, LA	W 33–6	
October 16	at Arkansas AM&N	Pumphrey Stadium; Pine Bluff, AR	W 36–6	
October 23	Langston	University Stadium; Baton Rouge, LA	W 25–6	
October 30	at Texas College	Steer Stadium; Tyler, TX	W 41–25	
November 6	Bishop	University Stadium; Baton Rouge, LA	W 77–0	
November 13	Wiley	University Stadium; Baton Rouge, LA	W 33–19	
November 20	Florida A&M*	University Stadium; Baton Rouge, LA	W 59–23	
November 27	at Prairie View A&M	Blackshear Field; Prairie View, TX	L 13–20	
December 4	Xavier (LA)*	University Stadium; Baton Rouge, LA	W 14–13	
*Non-conference game
