= 1954 Arkansas AM&N Golden Lions football team =

American college football season

1954 Arkansas AM&N Golden Lions football
- Conference: Southwestern Athletic Conference
- Record: 2–7–2 (1–5 SWAC)
- Head coach: Leroy Moore (2nd season)
- Home stadium: Pumphrey Stadium

1954 Southwestern Athletic Conference football standings
	Conf.					Overall
Team	W		L		T	W		L		T
No. 3 Prairie View A&M $	6	–	0	–	0	10	–	1	–	0
No. 4 Southern	5	–	1	–	0	10	–	1	–	0
Langston	4	–	2	–	0	4	–	4	–	1
Texas College	3	–	3	–	0	4	–	6	–	0
Wiley	2	–	4	–	0	5	–	5	–	0
Arkansas AM&N	1	–	5	–	0	2	–	7	–	2
Bishop	0	–	6	–	0	1	–	7	–	0
$ – Conference champion; Rankings from Associated Negro Press

The 1954 Arkansas AM&N Golden Lions football team represented the Arkansas Agricultural, Mechanical and Normal College (now known as the University of Arkansas at Pine Bluff) as a member of the Southwestern Athletic Conference (SWAC) during the 1954 college football season. Led by second-year head coach Leroy Moore, the Golden Lions compiled an overall record of 2–6–1, with a conference record of 1–5, and finished sixth in the SWAC.

== Schedule ==
Date	Opponent	Site	Result	Source
September 18	Jackson*	Pumphrey Stadium; Pine Bluff, AR	T 6–6	
September 25	at Lincoln (MO)*	Lincoln Field; Jefferson City, MO	W 18–13	
October 9	vs. Wiley	Bishop Bryan Shamrock Stadium; Port Arthur, TX	L 13–26	
October 16	Southern	Pumphrey Stadium; Pine Bluff, AR	L 6–36	
October 23	Bishop^{†}	Pumphrey Stadium; Pine Bluff, AR	W 19–8	
October 30	at Prairie View A&M	Blackshear Field; Prairie View, TX	L 0–26	
November 6	Alcorn A&M*	Pumphrey Stadium; Pine Bluff, AR	T 0–0	
November 13	at Langston	Anderson Field; Langston, OK	L 6–23	
November 20	Grambling*	Pumphrey Stadium; Pine Bluff, AR	L 13–21	
November 25	Texas Southern*	Pumphrey Stadium; Pine Bluff, AR	L 8–14	
December 4	vs. Texas College	State Fair Stadium; Shreveport, LA	L 9–28	
*Non-conference game; ^{†}Homecoming
