= 1954 Tennessee A&I Tigers football team =

American college football season

1954 Tennessee A&I Tigers football

Black college national co-champion MWAA champion

National Classic, L 6–19 vs. North Carolina College
- Conference: Midwest Athletic Association
- Record: 10–1 (4–0 MWAA)
- Head coach: Henry Kean (4th season)
- Home stadium: Hale Stadium

1954 Midwest Athletic Association football standings
	Conf.					Overall
Team	W		L		T	W		L		T
No. 1 Tennessee A&I $	4	–	0	–	0	10	–	1	–	0
No. 22 Grambling	1	–	0	–	1	4	–	3	–	2
No. 13 Texas Southern	2	–	1	–	1	5	–	4	–	2
No. 16 Lincoln (MO)	3	–	2	–	0	4	–	3	–	1
No. 19 Central State (OH)	1	–	2	–	0	4	–	4	–	0
No. 20 Kentucky State	1	–	3	–	0	5	–	3	–	0
Jackson	0	–	4	–	0	1	–	7	–	0
$ – Conference champion; Rankings from Associated Negro Press

The 1954 Tennessee A&I Tigers football team represented Tennessee Agricultural & Industrial State College as a member of the Midwest Athletic Association (MWAA) during the 1954 college football season. In their fourth and final season under head coach Henry Kean, the Tigers compiled a 10–1 record, won the MWAA championship, lost to North Carolina Central in the National Classic, and outscored all opponents by a total of 330 to 70.

The team was selected by the "Pigskin Huddle" as the 1954 black college national champion. The Pittsburgh Courier selected the Tigers as black college national co-champion in a five-way tie with four other teams.

Coach Kean suffered a double heart attack following the team's December 4 game with North Carolina Central. He did not return as the team's coach and died one year later in December 1955.

== Schedule ==
Date	Time	Opponent	Site	Result	Attendance	Source
September 18		vs. Lincoln (MO)	Melrose Stadium; Memphis, TN	W 33–13	8,500	
September 25		at Virginia State*	Rogers Stadium; Ettrick, VA	W 18–0	3,500	
October 1		Langston*	Nashville, TN	W 14–0		
October 9		at Allen*	Columbia, SC	W 21–2		
October 16		Paul Quinn*	Hale Stadium; Nashville, TN	W 74–6		
October 23		at Central State (OH)	Wilberforce, OH	W 40–0		
October 30		North Carolina College*	Hale Stadium; Nashville, TN	W 13–3		
November 6		at Texas Southern	Houston, TX	W 18–15		
November 20		at Kentucky State	Frankfort, KY	W 34–12		
November 25		Bluefield State*	Hale Stadium; Nashville, TN	W 59–0	6,500	
December 4	1:00 p.m.	vs. North Carolina College*	World War Memorial Stadium; Greensboro, NC (National Classic)	L 6–19	2,500	
*Non-conference game; All times are in Central time
