= 1954 college football season =

American college football season

- First AP No. 1 of season: Notre Dame
- Number of bowls: 7
- Champion(s): Ohio State (AP); UCLA (UPI, FWAA)
- Heisman: Alan Ameche (fullback, Wisconsin)

The 1954 college football season was the 86th season of intercollegiate football in the United States. It saw three major college teams finish unbeaten and untied:

- Ohio State compiled a 10–0 record in its fourth season under Woody Hayes and defeated USC in the Rose Bowl. The Buckeyes were ranked No. 1 in the final Associated Press (AP) poll and No. 2 in the final United Press (UP) coaches poll. Halfback Howard Cassady was named the team's most valuable player.
- UCLA compiled a 9–0 record in its sixth season under Red Sanders. The Bruins were ranked No. 1 in the UP poll and No. 2 in the AP poll. The Bruins were also ranked No. 1 by the Football Writers Association of America (FWAA). Despite winning the Pacific Coast Conference championship, UCLA did not play in the Rose Bowl due to a "no repeat" rule (UCLA having played in the game the prior year).
- Oklahoma compiled a 10–0 record in its 10th season under Bud Wilkinson and was ranked No. 3 in the final AP and UP polls. The Sooners ranked seventh nationally in total offense (382.7 yards per game) and fifth in total defense (186.3 yards per game). The 1954 season was part of a 47-game winning streak that ran from October 10, 1953, to November 9, 1957.

California played all three of the undefeated teams. They lost in week 1 to Oklahoma in Berkeley 27-13, they lost in week 3 to Ohio State in Columbus 21-13, and they lost in week 7 to UCLA in Berkeley 27-6.

Wisconsin fullback Alan Ameche won the Heisman Trophy, and Navy end Ron Beagle won the Maxwell Award. Individual statistical leaders in major college football included Arizona tailback Art Luppino with 1,359 rushing yards and 166 points scored, Oregon quarterback George Shaw with 1,536 yards of total offense, California quarterback Paul Larson with 1,537 passing yards, and California end Jim Hanifan with 44 receptions.

Small college teams with perfect seasons included Omaha (10–0 Tangerine Bowl champion), Juniata (three consecutive undefeated seasons), Trinity (CT) (consecutive perfect seasons), and Whitworth (part of a 21-game winning streak).

== Conference and program changes ==
- The ACC voted to add Virginia as its eighth football-playing member in December 1953.

School	1953 Conference	1954 Conference
Virginia Cavaliers	Independent	ACC
DePauw Tigers	Independent	ICC

== September ==
In the preseason poll released on September 13, 1954, No. 1 Notre Dame had the most points, although No. 2 Oklahoma had more first place votes (74 vs. 52). Rounding out the Top Five were defending champion No. 3 Maryland, No. 4 Texas and No. 5 Illinois. As the regular season progressed, a new poll would be issued on the Monday following the weekend's games.

September 18, No. 2 Oklahoma won at No. 12 California 27–13, and No. 3 Maryland won at Kentucky, 20–0. Notre Dame and Texas, No. 1 and No. 4, were preparing to meet at South Bend to open their seasons. Oklahoma replaced Notre Dame as No. 1 in the first regular poll. No. 7 Georgia Tech, which beat Tulane 28–0 in Atlanta, replaced Illinois in the Top Five. Defying high expectations, the Illini would lose their opener to Penn State, 14–12, and finish the season with a 1–8–0 record. The next poll: No. 1 Oklahoma, No. 2 Notre Dame, No. 3 Maryland, No. 4 Texas, and No. 5 Georgia Tech.

September 25 No. 2 Notre Dame hosted No. 4 Texas and won 21–0. No. 1 Oklahoma beat No. 20 Texas Christian (TCU) 21–16. No. 3 Maryland was idle, and No. 5 Georgia Tech lost to Florida, 13–12. Notre Dame took back over the top spot from O.U., and Texas, Maryland and Georgia Tech were replaced by No. 8 UCLA (32–7 over Kansas), No. 10 Wisconsin (52–14 over Marquette) and No. 11 Iowa (14–10 over No. 7 Michigan State). The poll: No. 1 Notre Dame, No. 2 Oklahoma, No. 3 Iowa, No. 4 UCLA, and No. 5 Wisconsin.

== October ==
In a Friday game, No. 4 UCLA beat defending national champion No. 6 Maryland 12–7. The next day, October 2, No. 1 Notre Dame was upset by No. 19 Purdue, 27–14. No. 2 Oklahoma which was idle, moved to the top as Notre Dame dropped to eighth. No. 3 Iowa defeated visiting Montana, 48–6, and No. 5 Wisconsin beat No. 13 Michigan State 6–0. The next poll: No. 1 Oklahoma, No. 2 UCLA, No. 3 Wisconsin, No. 4 Iowa, and No. 5 Purdue.

October 9 No. 1 Oklahoma won its annual game in Dallas against No. 15 Texas, 14–7. No. 2 UCLA edged Washington 21–20. No. 3 Wisconsin beat No. 11 Rice 13–7. No. 4 Iowa lost to unranked Michigan, 14–13, and No. 5 Purdue was tied by No. 6 Duke, 13–13. No. 10 Ohio State, which had won at Illinois 40–7, entered the Top Five: No. 1 Oklahoma, No. 2 Wisconsin, No. 3 UCLA, No. 4 Ohio State, and No. 5 Purdue.

October 16 No. 2 Wisconsin hosted No. 5 Purdue and won 20–6. No. 1 Oklahoma visited Kansas and annihilated it, 65–0, while No. 3 UCLA went one better in beating Stanford 72–0. No. 4 Ohio State beat No. 13 Iowa 20–14. No. 7 Ole Miss, which had beaten Tulane 34–7, entered the Top Five: No. 1 Oklahoma, No. 2 Wisconsin, No. 3 UCLA, No. 4 Ohio State, and No. 5 Mississippi.

October 23 No. 2 Wisconsin faced its second high-ranked opponent in a week, visiting Big Ten rival and No. 4 Ohio State. OSU won, 31–14, to take the No. 1 spot. No. 1 Oklahoma beat Kansas State 21–0, and No. 3 UCLA beat Oregon State 61–0. No. 5 Mississippi lost to No. 7 Arkansas at Little Rock, 6–0. No. 9 Army, which had won 67–12 at Columbia, moved up. The next poll: No. 1 Ohio State, No. 2 Oklahoma, No. 3 UCLA, No. 4 Arkansas, and No. 5 Army.

October 30 No. 1 Ohio State won at Northwestern, 14–7. No. 2 Oklahoma won 13–6 at Colorado. No. 3 UCLA won at California 27–6 and was given top billing in the next poll. No. 4 Arkansas won 14–7 at Texas A&M. No. 5 Army, which got to stay home, edged Virginia 21–20. No. 6 Notre Dame, which beat No. 15 Navy 6–0 in Baltimore, moved up. The next poll: No. 1 UCLA, No. 2 Ohio State, No. 3 Oklahoma, No. 4 Arkansas, and No. 5 Notre Dame.

== November ==
November 6 No. 1 UCLA won at Oregon 41–0. No. 2 Ohio State beat visiting No. 20 Pittsburgh, 26–0. No. 3 Oklahoma won at Iowa State 40–0. No. 4 Arkansas, playing at Little Rock, beat No. 15 Rice 28–15, and No. 5 Notre Dame won at Penn, 42–7. The top five remained the same.

November 13 No. 1 UCLA had the week off, while No. 2 Ohio State won at Purdue 28–6 and got back the top rung. No. 3 Oklahoma beat Missouri 34–13. No. 4 Arkansas lost to No. 19 SMU, 21–14. No. 5 Notre Dame beat North Carolina, 42–13. No. 6 Army, which at won at Penn 35–0, came back to the Top Five: No. 1 Ohio State, No. 2 UCLA, No. 3 Oklahoma, No. 4 Notre Dame, and No. 5 Army.

November 20 No. 1 Ohio State beat No. 12 Michigan 21–7. In Los Angeles, No. 2 UCLA beat its crosstown rival, No. 7 USC, 34–0. No. 3 Oklahoma beat Nebraska 55–7. No. 4 Notre Dame won at No. 19 Iowa 34–18. No. 5 Army had the day off, preparing for the Army-Navy game. The top five remained the same.

November 27 No. 1 Ohio State and No. 2 UCLA had finished their seasons, both of them undefeated and untied. No. 3 Oklahoma also finished with a perfect record, winning its annual season-closer at Oklahoma A&M 14–0. No. 4 Notre Dame beat No. 17 USC 23–17. In Philadelphia, No. 5 Army was beaten by No. 6 Navy, 27–20. The AP's final top five were No. 1 Ohio State, No. 2 UCLA, No. 3 Oklahoma, No. 4 Notre Dame, and No. 5 Navy, although the Coaches Poll selected UCLA as its top team. Under normal circumstances the Buckeyes and Bruins would have met in the Rose Bowl for a national championship showdown, but the Pacific Coast Conference's short-lived "no-repeat" rule forced UCLA to stay home because they had played in the previous year's Rose Bowl. Instead, Ohio State matched up with No. 17 USC, whom they defeated 20–7.

== Conference standings ==
=== Major conference standings ===
1954 Atlantic Coast Conference football standings
	Conf.					Overall
Team	W		L		T	W		L		T
No. 14 Duke $	4	–	0	–	0	8	–	2	–	1
No. 8 Maryland	4	–	0	–	1	7	–	2	–	1
North Carolina	4	–	2	–	0	4	–	5	–	1
South Carolina	3	–	3	–	0	6	–	4	–	0
Clemson	1	–	2	–	0	5	–	5	–	0
Wake Forest	1	–	4	–	1	2	–	7	–	1
Virginia	0	–	2	–	0	3	–	6	–	0
NC State	0	–	4	–	0	2	–	8	–	0
$ – Conference champion; Rankings from AP poll

1954 Big Seven Conference football standings
	Conf.					Overall
Team	W		L		T	W		L		T
No. 3 Oklahoma $	6	–	0	–	0	10	–	0	–	0
Nebraska	4	–	2	–	0	6	–	5	–	0
Colorado	3	–	2	–	1	7	–	2	–	1
Missouri	3	–	2	–	1	4	–	5	–	1
Kansas State	3	–	3	–	0	7	–	3	–	0
Iowa State	1	–	5	–	0	3	–	6	–	0
Kansas	0	–	6	–	0	0	–	10	–	0
$ – Conference champion; Rankings from AP Poll

1954 Big Ten Conference football standings
	Conf.					Overall
Team	W		L		T	W		L		T
No. 1 Ohio State $	7	–	0	–	0	10	–	0	–	0
No. 9 Wisconsin	5	–	2	–	0	7	–	2	–	0
No. 15 Michigan	5	–	2	–	0	6	–	3	–	0
Minnesota	4	–	2	–	0	7	–	2	–	0
Iowa	4	–	3	–	0	5	–	4	–	0
Purdue	3	–	3	–	0	5	–	3	–	1
Indiana	2	–	4	–	0	3	–	6	–	0
Michigan State	1	–	5	–	0	3	–	6	–	0
Northwestern	1	–	5	–	0	2	–	7	–	0
Illinois	0	–	6	–	0	1	–	8	–	0
$ – Conference champion; Rankings from AP Poll

1954 Border Conference football standings
	Conf.					Overall
Team	W		L		T	W		L		T
Texas Tech $	4	–	0	–	0	7	–	2	–	1
Arizona State	3	–	1	–	0	5	–	5	–	0
Texas Western	4	–	2	–	0	8	–	3	–	0
Arizona	3	–	2	–	0	7	–	3	–	0
Hardin–Simmons	2	–	3	–	0	4	–	6	–	0
West Texas State	1	–	5	–	0	1	–	8	–	0
New Mexico A&M	0	–	4	–	0	0	–	9	–	0
$ – Conference champion

1954 Far Western Conference football standings
	Conf.					Overall
Team	W		L		T	W		L		T
San Francisco State $	5	–	0	–	0	8	–	2	–	0
Chico State	4	–	1	–	0	7	–	2	–	0
Humboldt State	3	–	2	–	0	5	–	5	–	0
Nevada	2	–	3	–	0	2	–	5	–	0
Cal Aggies	1	–	4	–	0	1	–	7	–	0
Sacramento State	0	–	5	–	0	0	–	7	–	0
$ – Conference champion; * – Second San Francisco State vs. Nevada game did not count in conference standings

1954 Ivy League football standings
	Conf.					Overall
Team	W		L		T	W		L		T
Yale	4	–	2	–	0	5	–	3	–	1
Cornell	4	–	2	–	0	5	–	4	–	0
Brown	2	–	1	–	1	6	–	2	–	1
Harvard	3	–	2	–	1	4	–	3	–	1
Princeton	4	–	3	–	0	5	–	3	–	1
Dartmouth	2	–	3	–	0	3	–	6	–	0
Columbia	1	–	5	–	0	1	–	8	–	0
Penn	0	–	2	–	0	0	–	9	–	0
The Ivy League did not crown an official champion until 1956 when full league play began.

1954 Mid-American Conference football standings
	Conf.					Overall
Team	W		L		T	W		L		T
Miami (OH) $	4	–	0	–	0	8	–	1	–	0
Kent State	4	–	1	–	0	8	–	2	–	0
Ohio	5	–	2	–	0	6	–	3	–	0
Toledo	3	–	2	–	0	6	–	2	–	1
Western Michigan	3	–	4	–	0	4	–	5	–	0
Western Reserve	2	–	3	–	0	3	–	4	–	1
Marshall	2	–	5	–	0	4	–	5	–	0
Bowling Green	0	–	6	–	0	2	–	7	–	0
$ – Conference champion

1954 Middle Three Conference football standings
	Conf.					Overall
Team	W		L		T	W		L		T
Lehigh +	1	–	1	–	0	4	–	5	–	0
Rutgers +	1	–	1	–	0	3	–	6	–	0
Lafayette +	1	–	1	–	0	2	–	5	–	2
+ – Conference co-champions

1954 Pacific Coast Conference football standings
	Conf.					Overall
Team	W		L		T	W		L		T
No. 2 UCLA $	6	–	0	–	0	9	–	0	–	0
No. 17 USC ^	6	–	1	–	0	8	–	4	–	0
Oregon	5	–	3	–	0	6	–	4	–	0
California	4	–	3	–	0	5	–	5	–	0
Washington State	3	–	4	–	0	4	–	6	–	0
Stanford	2	–	4	–	0	4	–	6	–	0
Idaho	1	–	2	–	0	4	–	5	–	0
Washington	1	–	6	–	0	2	–	8	–	0
Oregon State	1	–	6	–	0	1	–	8	–	0
$ – Conference champion; ^ – Selected as Rose Bowl representative UCLA won rivalry game over USC, but no-repeat rule was in effect; Rankings from AP Poll

1954 Skyline Conference football standings
	Conf.					Overall
Team	W		L		T	W		L		T
Denver $	6	–	1	–	0	9	–	1	–	0
Wyoming	5	–	1	–	0	6	–	4	–	0
Utah State	4	–	3	–	0	4	–	6	–	0
New Mexico	3	–	3	–	0	5	–	5	–	0
Utah	3	–	3	–	0	4	–	7	–	0
Colorado A&M	3	–	4	–	0	3	–	7	–	0
Montana	1	–	5	–	0	3	–	6	–	0
BYU	1	–	6	–	0	1	–	8	–	0
$ – Conference champion

1954 Southeastern Conference football standings
	Conf.					Overall
Team	W		L		T	W		L		T
No. 6 Ole Miss $	5	–	1	–	0	9	–	2	–	0
Georgia Tech	6	–	2	–	0	8	–	3	–	0
Florida	5	–	2	–	0	5	–	5	–	0
Kentucky	5	–	2	–	0	7	–	3	–	0
Georgia	3	–	2	–	1	6	–	3	–	1
No. 13 Auburn	3	–	3	–	0	8	–	3	–	0
Mississippi State	3	–	3	–	0	6	–	4	–	0
Alabama	3	–	3	–	2	4	–	5	–	2
LSU	2	–	5	–	0	5	–	6	–	0
Tulane	1	–	6	–	1	1	–	6	–	3
Vanderbilt	1	–	5	–	0	2	–	7	–	0
Tennessee	1	–	5	–	0	4	–	6	–	0
$ – Conference champion; Ole Miss's game against Arkansas counted in the conference standings.; Rankings from AP Poll

1954 Southern Conference football standings
	Conf.					Overall
Team	W		L		T	W		L		T
No. 12 West Virginia $	3	–	0	–	0	8	–	1	–	0
Furman	2	–	0	–	0	5	–	5	–	0
No. 16 VPI	3	–	0	–	1	8	–	0	–	1
Davidson	2	–	1	–	0	6	–	3	–	0
VMI	4	–	3	–	0	4	–	6	–	0
Richmond	2	–	3	–	0	5	–	4	–	0
William & Mary	1	–	2	–	2	4	–	4	–	2
George Washington	0	–	4	–	1	1	–	7	–	1
The Citadel	0	–	4	–	0	2	–	8	–	0
$ – Conference champion; Rankings from AP Poll

1954 Southwest Conference football standings
	Conf.					Overall
Team	W		L		T	W		L		T
No. 10 Arkansas $	5	–	1	–	0	8	–	3	–	0
SMU	4	–	1	–	1	6	–	3	–	1
No. 19 Rice	4	–	2	–	0	7	–	3	–	0
No. 18 Baylor	4	–	2	–	0	7	–	4	–	0
Texas	2	–	3	–	1	4	–	5	–	1
TCU	1	–	5	–	0	4	–	6	–	0
Texas A&M	0	–	6	–	0	1	–	9	–	0
$ – Conference champion; Rankings from AP Poll

=== Independents ===
1954 Eastern college football independents records
	Conf.			Overall
Team	W	L	T	W		L		T
Hobart		–		8	–	0	–	0
Juniata		–		8	–	0	–	0
Pennsylvania Military		–		7	–	0	–	0
Trinity (CT)		–		7	–	0	–	0
Worcester Tech		–		6	–	0	–	0
Carnegie Tech		–		7	–	0	–	1
Boston College		–		8	–	1	–	0
Boston University		–		7	–	2	–	0
Hofstra		–		7	–	2	–	0
No. 20 Penn State		–		7	–	2	–	0
Tufts		–		6	–	2	–	0
Brown		–		6	–	2	–	1
Drexel		–		5	–	2	–	0
Bucknell		–		6	–	3	–	0
Colgate		–		5	–	2	–	2
Princeton		–		5	–	3	–	1
Yale		–		5	–	3	–	1
Cornell		–		5	–	4	–	0
Harvard		–		4	–	3	–	1
Syracuse		–		4	–	4	–	0
Pittsburgh		–		4	–	5	–	0
Franklin & Marshall		–		3	–	5	–	0
Temple		–		3	–	5	–	0
Dartmouth		–		3	–	6	–	0
Holy Cross		–		3	–	7	–	0
Buffalo		–		2	–	7	–	0
Fordham		–		1	–	7	–	1
Columbia		–		1	–	8	–	0
Villanova		–		1	–	9	–	0
Penn		–		0	–	9	–	0
Rankings from AP Poll

1954 Midwestern college football independents records
	Conf.			Overall
Team	W	L	T	W		L		T
Omaha		–		10	–	0	–	0
No. 4 Notre Dame		–		9	–	1	–	0
Wabash		–		7	–	1	–	1
Cincinnati		–		8	–	2	–	0
Youngstown		–		7	–	2	–	0
Washington University		–		6	–	3	–	0
Carthage		–		5	–	3	–	0
Dayton		–		5	–	5	–	0
Michigan Tech		–		3	–	4	–	0
Marquette		–		3	–	5	–	1
Wayne		–		3	–	5	–	1
John Carroll		–		3	–	5	–	0
Rose Poly		–		2	–	5	–	0
Drake		–		2	–	7	–	0
Xavier		–		2	–	8	–	0
Baldwin–Wallace		–		1	–	8	–	0
Rankings from AP Poll

1954 Southern college football independents records
	Conf.			Overall
Team	W	L	T	W		L		T
No. 9 Miami (FL)		–		8	–	1	–	0
Delaware		–		8	–	2	–	0
No. 5 Navy		–		8	–	2	–	0
Tampa		–		8	–	2	–	0
Florida State		–		8	–	4	–	0
Abilene Christian		–		6	–	3	–	1
Chattanooga		–		6	–	4	–	0
Mississippi Southern		–		6	–	4	–	0
Memphis State		–		3	–	4	–	3
Louisville		–		3	–	6	–	0
Arkansas State		–		1	–	8	–	0
Sewanee		–		0	–	8	–	0
Rankings from AP Poll

1954 Western college football independents records
	Conf.			Overall
Team	W	L	T	W		L		T
San Jose State		–		7	–	3	–	0
Pacific (CA)		–		4	–	5	–	0
Hawaii		–		4	–	4	–	0
La Verne		–		2	–	6	–	0
Cal Poly San Dimas		–		1	–	8	–	0

=== Minor conferences ===
Conference	Champion(s)	Record
California Collegiate Athletic Association	Fresno State Normal	4–0
Central Church College Conference	Concordia (NE)	3–0
Central Intercollegiate Athletics Association	North Carolina College	6–0–1
Central Intercollegiate Athletic Conference	Kansas State Teachers–Hays; Washburn	4–1
College Conference of Illinois	Millikin; Wheaton (IL)	5–1
Evergreen Conference	Whitworth	6–0
Far Western Conference	San Francisco State	5–0
Frontier Conference	Carroll (MT)	4–0
Gulf Coast Conference	Trinity (TX)	2–0
Indiana Collegiate Conference	Valparaiso	5–1
Iowa Intercollegiate Athletic Conference	Luther	6–0
Kansas Collegiate Athletic Conference	College of Emporia	7–0
Lone Star Conference	East Texas State Teachers; Southwest Texas State Teachers	5–0–1
Michigan Intercollegiate Athletic Association	Hillsdale	6–0
Mid-American Conference	Miami (OH)	4–0
Midwest Collegiate Athletic Conference	Carleton	8–0
Minnesota Intercollegiate Athletic Conference	Gustavus Adolphus	6–0
Missouri Intercollegiate Athletic Association	Northeast Missouri State	5–0
Nebraska College Conference	Hastings	7–0
New Mexico Intercollegiate Conference	Panhandle A&M	5–0
North Central Intercollegiate Athletic Conference	Morningside; South Dakota State College	5–1
North Dakota College Athletic Conference	Minot State Teachers; Valley City State	6–0
Ohio Athletic Conference	Heidelberg	5–0–1
Ohio Valley Conference	Eastern Kentucky State	5–0
Oklahoma Collegiate Athletic Conference	Central State College (OK); Southwestern State College (OK)	4–1
Oregon Collegiate Conference	Unknown	—
Pacific Northwest Conference	College of Idaho; Lewis & Clark; Willamette	4–1
Pennsylvania State Athletic Conference	East Stroudsburg State Teachers; Shippensburg State Teachers	4–1; 5–1
Rocky Mountain Athletic Conference	Western State	7–1
South Dakota Intercollegiate Conference	Southern State Teachers (USD–Springfield)	6–1
Southern California Intercollegiate Athletic Conference	Pomona-Pitzer	4–0
Southern Intercollegiate Athletic Conference	Florida A&M	4–0
Southwestern Athletic Conference	Prairie View A&M College	6–0
State Teacher's College Conference of Minnesota	St. Cloud State Teachers	4–0
Texas Collegiate Athletic Conference	Howard Payne	2–0
Wisconsin State College Conference	Wisconsin State–La Crosse	4–0–1

=== Minor conference standings ===
1954 California Collegiate Athletic Association football standings
	Conf.					Overall
Team	W		L		T	W		L		T
Fresno State $	4	–	0	–	0	7	–	3	–	0
Cal Poly	3	–	1	–	0	6	–	4	–	0
San Diego State	2	–	2	–	0	5	–	4	–	0
Santa Barbara	1	–	3	–	0	4	–	5	–	0
Los Angeles State	0	–	4	–	0	2	–	6	–	1
Pepperdine *	0	–	0	–	0	6	–	2	–	0
$ – Conference champion; Pepperdine had a record of 1–2 against conference opponents, but those games did not count in the CCAA standings.

1954 Central Church College Conference football standings
	Conf.					Overall
Team	W		L		T	W		L		T
Concordia (NE) $	3	–	0	–	0	7	–	1	–	1
Tarkio	2	–	1	–	0	4	–	3	–	1
Westmar	1	–	2	–	0	3	–	5	–	0
Dana	0	–	3	–	0	1	–	5	–	1
$ – Conference champion

1954 Central Intercollegiate Athletic Association football standings
	Conf.					Overall
Team	W		L		T	W		L		T
No. 5 North Carolina College $	6	–	0	–	1	7	–	1	–	1
No. 6 Maryland State	5	–	0	–	1	6	–	1	–	1
No. 8 Virginia State	7	–	1	–	0	7	–	2	–	0
No. 10 Bluefield State	6	–	1	–	0	8	–	2	–	0
No. 18 St. Augustine's	6	–	2	–	0	6	–	3	–	0
Delaware State	5	–	1	–	0	7	–	1	–	0
No. 12 Virginia Union	5	–	3	–	0	5	–	3	–	0
No. 23 Morgan State	4	–	2	–	0	6	–	3	–	0
Hampton	4	–	5	–	1	4	–	5	–	1
Lincoln (PA)	3	–	3	–	0	4	–	3	–	1
No. 24 North Carolina A&T	2	–	5	–	0	4	–	6	–	0
Winston-Salem State	2	–	5	–	0	3	–	5	–	0
Johnson C. Smith	1	–	4	–	1	1	–	5	–	2
West Virginia State	1	–	5	–	0	3	–	6	–	0
Fayetteville State	1	–	5	–	0	3	–	6	–	0
Saint Paul's (VA)	1	–	6	–	0	2	–	6	–	0
Howard	0	–	5	–	1	2	–	6	–	1
Shaw	0	–	6	–	1	0	–	7	–	1
$ – Conference champion; Conference standings were based on the Dickinson System.; Rankings from Associated Negro Press

1954 Central Intercollegiate Conference football standings
	Conf.					Overall
Team	W		L		T	W		L		T
Fort Hays State +	4	–	1	–	0	7	–	2	–	0
Washburn +	4	–	1	–	0	6	–	2	–	0
Pittsburg State	3	–	2	–	0	6	–	2	–	0
St. Benedict's	2	–	3	–	0	2	–	5	–	1
Emporia State	2	–	3	–	0	2	–	7	–	0
Southwestern (KS)	0	–	5	–	0	1	–	8	–	0
+ – Conference co-champions

1954 College Conference of Illinois football standings
	Conf.					Overall
Team	W		L		T	W		L		T
Wheaton (IL) +	5	–	1	–	0	6	–	2	–	0
Millikin +	5	–	1	–	0	5	–	3	–	0
Illinois Wesleyan	4	–	1	–	0	5	–	3	–	0
Lake Forest	3	–	3	–	0	3	–	5	–	0
Augustana (IL)	2	–	4	–	0	3	–	5	–	0
North Central (IL)	1	–	4	–	0	2	–	6	–	0
Elmhurst	0	–	6	–	0	0	–	8	–	0
+ – Conference co-champions

1954 Eastern Intercollegiate Athletic Conference football standings
	Conf.					Overall
Team	W		L		T	W		L		T
Elizabeth City State $	3	–	0	–	0	8	–	1	–	0
Livingstone	2	–	1	–	0	5	–	2	–	0
Norfolk State	1	–	2	–	0	2	–	4	–	0
Morristown	0	–	3	–	0	0	–	5	–	0
$ – Conference champion

1954 Evergreen Conference football standings
	Conf.					Overall
Team	W		L		T	W		L		T
Whitworth $	6	–	0	–	0	8	–	0	–	0
Puget Sound	5	–	1	–	0	6	–	2	–	0
Pacific Lutheran	4	–	2	–	0	5	–	3	–	0
Western Washington	3	–	3	–	0	3	–	5	–	0
Central Washington	2	–	4	–	0	2	–	6	–	0
Eastern Washington	1	–	5	–	0	1	–	8	–	0
UBC	0	–	6	–	0	?	–	?	–	?
$ – Conference champion

1954 Gulf Coast Conference football standings
	Conf.					Overall
Team	W		L		T	W		L		T
Trinity (TX) $	2	–	0	–	0	9	–	0	–	0
North Texas State	1	–	1	–	0	4	–	6	–	0
Midwestern (TX)	0	–	2	–	0	4	–	5	–	1
$ – Conference champion

1954 Gulf States Conference football standings
	Conf.					Overall
Team	W		L		T	W		L		T
Southeastern Louisiana $	6	–	0	–	0	9	–	0	–	0
Northwestern State	4	–	2	–	0	7	–	2	–	0
Louisiana Tech	4	–	2	–	0	6	–	3	–	0
Southwestern Louisiana	4	–	2	–	0	5	–	4	–	0
Louisiana College	1	–	4	–	1	4	–	5	–	1
McNeese State	1	–	5	–	0	2	–	8	–	0
Northeast Louisiana State	0	–	5	–	1	1	–	8	–	1
$ – Conference champion

1954 Hoosier Conference football standings
	Conf.					Overall
Team	W		L		T	W		L		T
Indiana Central $	6	–	0	–	0	6	–	3	–	0
Taylor	4	–	2	–	0	6	–	2	–	0
Hanover	4	–	2	–	0	4	–	5	–	0
Franklin (IN)	2	–	4	–	0	3	–	4	–	1
Anderson (IN)	2	–	4	–	0	2	–	7	–	0
Manchester (IN)	2	–	4	–	0	2	–	7	–	0
Earlham	1	–	5	–	0	1	–	7	–	0
$ – Conference champion

1954 Indiana Collegiate Conference football standings
	Conf.					Overall
Team	W		L		T	W		L		T
Valparaiso $	5	–	1	–	0	6	–	2	–	1
Ball State	4	–	2	–	0	6	–	2	–	0
Evansville	4	–	2	–	0	5	–	4	–	0
Butler	3	–	2	–	0	4	–	4	–	0
Saint Joseph's (IN)	2	–	4	–	0	5	–	4	–	0
Indiana State	2	–	4	–	0	4	–	4	–	0
DePauw	0	–	5	–	0	0	–	7	–	1
$ – Conference champion

1954 Interstate Intercollegiate Athletic Conference football standings
	Conf.					Overall
Team	W		L		T	W		L		T
Michigan State Normal +	5	–	1	–	0	8	–	1	–	0
Central Michigan +	5	–	1	–	0	8	–	2	–	0
Western Illinois	3	–	1	–	2	6	–	1	–	3
Illinois State Normal	3	–	2	–	1	5	–	3	–	1
Eastern Illinois	1	–	4	–	1	2	–	6	–	1
Southern Illinois	1	–	5	–	0	2	–	7	–	0
Northern Illinois State	1	–	5	–	0	2	–	7	–	0
+ – Conference co-champions

1954 Iowa Conference football standings
	Conf.					Overall
Team	W		L		T	W		L		T
Luther $	6	–	0	–	0	9	–	0	–	0
Wartburg	5	–	1	–	0	5	–	2	–	1
Dubuque	4	–	1	–	1	4	–	3	–	1
Iowa Wesleyan	4	–	2	–	0	4	–	4	–	0
Buena Vista	3	–	2	–	1	5	–	3	–	1
Parsons	1	–	4	–	1	2	–	4	–	2
Central (IA)	1	–	5	–	0	3	–	5	–	0
Simpson (IA)	0	–	4	–	2	1	–	5	–	2
Upper Iowa	0	–	5	–	1	1	–	5	–	1
$ – Conference champion

1954 Kansas Collegiate Athletic Conference football standings
	Conf.					Overall
Team	W		L		T	W		L		T
College of Emporia $	7	–	0	–	0	9	–	1	–	0
Ottawa	5	–	1	–	1	6	–	2	–	1
Kansas Wesleyan	4	–	2	–	1	5	–	3	–	1
Bethel (KS)	4	–	2	–	1	4	–	3	–	1
McPherson	3	–	4	–	0	3	–	6	–	0
Baker	2	–	5	–	0	3	–	6	–	0
Bethany (KS)	1	–	5	–	1	1	–	6	–	1
Friends	0	–	7	–	0	1	–	8	–	0
$ – Conference champion

1954 Lone Star Conference football standings
	Conf.					Overall
Team	W		L		T	W		L		T
Southwest Texas State +	5	–	0	–	1	6	–	3	–	1
East Texas State +	5	–	0	–	1	6	–	3	–	1
Stephen F. Austin	3	–	3	–	0	6	–	3	–	0
Sam Houston State	3	–	3	–	0	6	–	4	–	0
Texas A&I	2	–	4	–	0	6	–	5	–	0
Sul Ross	1	–	5	–	0	4	–	7	–	0
Lamar Tech	1	–	5	–	0	3	–	7	–	0
+ – Conference co-champions

1954 Mason–Dixon Conference football standings
	Conf.					Overall
Team	W		L		T	W		L		T
Hampden–Sydney $	3	–	1	–	0	5	–	3	–	0
Randolph–Macon	2	–	1	–	0	6	–	3	–	0
Western Maryland	1	–	1	–	0	2	–	6	–	0
Bridgewater	1	–	2	–	0	2	–	4	–	1
Johns Hopkins	1	–	2	–	0	2	–	6	–	0
Gallaudet	0	–	1	–	0	0	–	5	–	0
$ – Conference champion

1954 Michigan Intercollegiate Athletic Association football standings
	Conf.					Overall
Team	W		L		T	W		L		T
Hillsdale $	6	–	0	–	0	7	–	1	–	1
Kalamazoo	4	–	2	–	0	6	–	2	–	0
Albion	4	–	2	–	0	5	–	3	–	0
Hope	3	–	3	–	0	3	–	6	–	0
Alma	2	–	4	–	0	6	–	4	–	0
Adrian	1	–	5	–	0	2	–	7	–	0
Olivet	1	–	5	–	0	1	–	7	–	1
$ – Conference champion

1954 Mid-Ohio League football standings
	Conf.					Overall
Team	W		L		T	W		L		T
Ashland $	4	–	0	–	0	7	–	0	–	0
Findlay	3	–	2	–	0	3	–	4	–	0
Wilmington (OH)	1	–	1	–	0	4	–	3	–	0
Bluffton	2	–	2	–	0	4	–	4	–	0
Defiance	2	–	3	–	0	4	–	4	–	0
Ohio Northern	0	–	4	–	0	1	–	7	–	0
$ – Conference champion

1954 Midwest Athletic Association football standings
	Conf.					Overall
Team	W		L		T	W		L		T
No. 1 Tennessee A&I $	4	–	0	–	0	10	–	1	–	0
No. 22 Grambling	1	–	0	–	1	4	–	3	–	2
No. 13 Texas Southern	2	–	1	–	1	5	–	4	–	2
No. 16 Lincoln (MO)	3	–	2	–	0	4	–	3	–	1
No. 19 Central State (OH)	1	–	2	–	0	4	–	4	–	0
No. 20 Kentucky State	1	–	3	–	0	5	–	3	–	0
Jackson	0	–	4	–	0	1	–	7	–	0
$ – Conference champion; Rankings from Associated Negro Press

1954 Midwest Conference football standings
	Conf.					Overall
Team	W		L		T	W		L		T
Carleton $	8	–	0	–	0	8	–	0	–	0
Lawrence	6	–	2	–	0	6	–	2	–	0
St. Olaf	5	–	1	–	2	5	–	1	–	2
Coe	4	–	3	–	1	4	–	3	–	1
Grinnell	2	–	4	–	2	2	–	4	–	2
Ripon	2	–	4	–	2	2	–	4	–	2
Cornell (IA)	2	–	5	–	1	2	–	5	–	1
Monmouth (IL)	2	–	6	–	0	2	–	6	–	0
Knox	1	–	7	–	0	1	–	7	–	0
$ – Conference champion

1954 Minnesota Intercollegiate Athletic Conference football standings
	Conf.					Overall
Team	W		L		T	W		L		T
Gustavus Adolphus $	6	–	0	–	0	7	–	2	–	0
Concordia (MN)	5	–	1	–	0	6	–	1	–	1
Saint John's (MN)	4	–	2	–	0	6	–	2	–	0
Minnesota–Duluth	4	–	2	–	0	5	–	3	–	0
St. Thomas (MN)	4	–	2	–	0	5	–	3	–	0
Hamline	3	–	3	–	0	4	–	3	–	0
Macalester	1	–	5	–	0	2	–	6	–	0
Augsburg	0	–	6	–	0	1	–	7	–	0
Saint Mary's (MN)	0	–	6	–	0	0	–	8	–	0
$ – Conference champion

1954 Minnesota Teachers College Conference football standings
	Conf.					Overall
Team	W		L		T	W		L		T
St. Cloud State $	4	–	0	–	0	5	–	3	–	0
Winona State	2	–	1	–	1	5	–	4	–	1
Moorhead State	2	–	2	–	0	4	–	3	–	1
Mankato State	1	–	3	–	0	2	–	7	–	0
Bemidji State	0	–	3	–	1	1	–	5	–	1
$ – Conference champion

1954 Missouri College Athletic Union football standings
	Conf.					Overall
Team	W		L		T	W		L		T
Missouri Valley +	2	–	0	–	1	7	–	1	–	2
William Jewell +	2	–	0	–	1	6	–	1	–	2
Tarkio	2	–	2	–	0	4	–	3	–	0
Central (MO)	1	–	3	–	0	2	–	7	–	0
Culver–Stockton	0	–	2	–	0	2	–	5	–	0
+ – Conference co-champions

1954 Missouri Intercollegiate Athletic Association football standings
	Conf.					Overall
Team	W		L		T	W		L		T
NE Missouri State $	5	–	0	–	0	7	–	1	–	0
SE Missouri State	4	–	1	–	0	7	–	2	–	0
Missouri–Rolla	3	–	2	–	0	3	–	5	–	0
Central Missouri State	1	–	4	–	0	3	–	6	–	0
NW Missouri State	1	–	4	–	0	2	–	6	–	0
SW Missouri State	1	–	4	–	0	2	–	6	–	0
$ – Conference champion

1954 Missouri Valley Conference football standings
	Conf.					Overall
Team	W		L		T	W		L		T
Wichita $	4	–	0	–	0	9	–	1	–	0
Houston	3	–	1	–	0	5	–	5	–	0
Oklahoma A&M	2	–	2	–	0	5	–	4	–	0
Detroit	1	–	3	–	0	2	–	7	–	0
Tulsa	0	–	4	–	0	0	–	11	–	0
$ – Conference champion

1954 Montana Collegiate Conference football standings
	Conf.					Overall
Team	W		L		T	W		L		T
Carroll (MT) $	4	–	0	–	0	5	–	2	–	1
Western Montana	3	–	1	–	0	?	–	?	–	?
Rocky Mountain	2	–	2	–	0	2	–	4	–	0
Eastern Montana	1	–	3	–	0	1	–	4	–	?
Montana Mines	0	–	4	–	0	?	–	?	–	?
$ – Conference champion

1954 Nebraska College Conference football standings
	Conf.					Overall
Team	W		L		T	W		L		T
Hastings $	7	–	0	–	0	9	–	0	–	0
Peru State	5	–	2	–	0	7	–	2	–	0
Kearney State	4	–	2	–	1	5	–	3	–	1
Midland	3	–	4	–	0	4	–	4	–	0
Wayne State (NE)	3	–	4	–	0	5	–	4	–	0
Doane	2	–	5	–	0	2	–	7	–	0
Nebraska Wesleyan	2	–	4	–	1	3	–	6	–	1
Chadron State	1	–	6	–	0	1	–	7	–	0
$ – Conference champion; Doane forfeited a conference win over Midland.

1954 New Mexico Conference football standings
	Conf.					Overall
Team	W		L		T	W		L		T
Panhandle A&M $	5	–	0	–	0	6	–	3	–	0
Adams State	3	–	2	–	0	3	–	6	–	0
New Mexico Highlands	2	–	2	–	1	5	–	2	–	1
New Mexico Western	2	–	3	–	0	4	–	4	–	0
New Mexico Military	1	–	3	–	1	1	–	5	–	1
Arizona State–Flagstaff	1	–	4	–	0	3	–	6	–	0
$ – Conference champion

1954 North Central Conference football standings
	Conf.					Overall
Team	W		L		T	W		L		T
South Dakota State +	5	–	1	–	0	7	–	2	–	0
Morningside +	5	–	1	–	0	5	–	3	–	0
South Dakota	3	–	3	–	0	5	–	4	–	0
North Dakota	3	–	3	–	0	4	–	5	–	0
Iowa State Teachers	3	–	3	–	0	3	–	5	–	0
North Dakota State	1	–	4	–	1	1	–	7	–	1
Augustana (SD)	0	–	5	–	1	1	–	7	–	1
+ – Conference co-champions

1954 North Dakota Intercollegiate Conference football standings
	Conf.					Overall
Team	W		L		T	W		L		T
Valley City State +	6	–	0	–	0	7	–	1	–	0
Minot State +	6	–	0	–	0	6	–	1	–	0
Jamestown	5	–	1	–	0	6	–	2	–	0
Wahpeton Science	4	–	2	–	0	5	–	2	–	0
Dickinson State	3	–	3	–	0	3	–	4	–	0
Ellendale	1	–	5	–	0	2	–	3	–	1
Mayville State	1	–	5	–	0	1	–	5	–	0
Bottineau	1	–	5	–	0	1	–	5	–	0
Bismarck JC	0	–	6	–	0	0	–	6	–	0
+ – Conference co-champions; Valley City State beat Jamestown on November 4 in a non-conference game.

1954 North State Conference football standings
	Conf.					Overall
Team	W		L		T	W		L		T
Appalachian State $	6	–	0	–	0	8	–	3	–	0
Elon	4	–	1	–	1	5	–	3	–	1
East Carolina	3	–	2	–	0	5	–	4	–	1
Western Carolina	2	–	2	–	1	4	–	5	–	1
Catawba	2	–	4	–	0	3	–	8	–	0
Guilford	1	–	3	–	0	1	–	7	–	0
Lenoir Rhyne	0	–	6	–	0	2	–	7	–	1
$ – Conference champion

1954 Northwest Conference football standings
	Conf.					Overall
Team	W		L		T	W		L		T
Lewis & Clark +	4	–	1	–	0	8	–	2	–	0
College of Idaho +	4	–	1	–	0	7	–	2	–	0
Willamette +	4	–	1	–	0	6	–	2	–	0
Whitman	1	–	4	–	0	4	–	4	–	0
Pacific (OR)	1	–	4	–	0	3	–	4	–	0
Linfield	1	–	4	–	0	3	–	6	–	0
+ – Conference co-champions

1954 Ohio Athletic Conference football standings
	Conf.					Overall
Team	W		L		T	W		L		T
Heidelberg $	5	–	0	–	1	7	–	1	–	1
Muskingum	5	–	1	–	1	6	–	2	–	1
Denison	5	–	2	–	0	6	–	2	–	1
Ohio Wesleyan	4	–	2	–	0	7	–	2	–	0
Capital	4	–	2	–	0	6	–	2	–	0
Wooster	4	–	3	–	0	6	–	3	–	0
Wittenberg	4	–	4	–	0	4	–	5	–	0
Akron	3	–	4	–	0	3	–	5	–	0
Oberlin	2	–	3	–	0	2	–	5	–	1
Otterbein	2	–	4	–	0	2	–	6	–	0
Marietta	1	–	3	–	1	4	–	3	–	1
Hiram	1	–	3	–	1	2	–	4	–	1
Mount Union	1	–	6	–	0	2	–	7	–	0
Kenyon	0	–	4	–	0	0	–	7	–	0
$ – Conference champion

1954 Ohio Valley Conference football standings
	Conf.					Overall
Team	W		L		T	W		L		T
Eastern Kentucky $	5	–	0	–	0	8	–	1	–	1
Western Kentucky	3	–	2	–	0	7	–	3	–	0
Murray State	3	–	2	–	0	5	–	4	–	0
Middle Tennessee	2	–	2	–	1	4	–	4	–	2
Tennessee Tech	1	–	3	–	1	4	–	4	–	2
Morehead State	0	–	5	–	0	0	–	9	–	0
$ – Conference champion

1954 Oklahoma Collegiate Conference football standings
	Conf.					Overall
Team	W		L		T	W		L		T
SW Oklahoma State +	4	–	1	–	0	7	–	2	–	0
Central State (OK) +	4	–	1	–	0	6	–	2	–	1
East Central	3	–	2	–	0	4	–	5	–	0
SE Oklahoma State	2	–	3	–	0	3	–	6	–	1
Northeastern State	1	–	3	–	0	3	–	6	–	0
NW Oklahoma State	1	–	4	–	0	2	–	7	–	0
+ – Conference co-champions

1954 Oregon Collegiate Conference football standings
	Conf.					Overall
Team	W		L		T	W		L		T
Oregon Tech +	3	–	1	–	0	6	–	4	–	0
Oregon College +	3	–	1	–	0	4	–	4	–	0
Portland State	2	–	2	–	0	3	–	5	–	0
Southern Oregon	2	–	2	–	0	2	–	5	–	0
Eastern Oregon	0	–	4	–	0	2	–	6	–	1
+ – Conference co-champions

1954 Pennsylvania State Teachers College Conference football standings
	Conf.					Overall
Team	W		L		T	W		L		T
Bloomsburg +	3	–	1	–	0	6	–	2	–	0
East Stroudsburg +	5	–	1	–	0	6	–	2	–	0
West Chester +	3	–	1	–	0	5	–	4	–	0
Shippensburg	4	–	1	–	0	7	–	1	–	0
Clarion	3	–	1	–	0	5	–	2	–	0
California (PA)	4	–	3	–	0	4	–	3	–	0
Lock Haven	4	–	3	–	1	5	–	3	–	1
Indiana (PA)	3	–	2	–	0	5	–	3	–	0
Mansfield	2	–	3	–	1	2	–	4	–	1
Millersville	2	–	5	–	0	3	–	5	–	0
Slippery Rock	1	–	3	–	0	1	–	7	–	0
Edinboro	1	–	4	–	0	1	–	6	–	0
Kutztown	1	–	3	–	0	3	–	3	–	1
Cheyney	0	–	5	–	0	0	–	8	–	0
+ – Conference co-champions; Conference standings were based on the Saylor system of ratings.

1954 Rocky Mountain Conference football standings
	Conf.					Overall
Team	W		L		T	W		L		T
Montana State $	6	–	0	–	0	8	–	1	–	0
Western State (CO)	7	–	1	–	0	9	–	1	–	0
Idaho State	3	–	3	–	0	4	–	4	–	0
Colorado Mines	4	–	4	–	0	4	–	5	–	0
Colorado State–Greeley	1	–	6	–	1	1	–	7	–	1
Colorado College	0	–	7	–	1	1	–	8	–	1
$ – Conference champion

1954 South Dakota Intercollegiate Conference football standings
	Conf.					Overall
Team	W		L		T	W		L		T
Southern State (SD) +	6	–	1	–	0	6	–	1	–	0
Northern State +	6	–	1	–	0	6	–	2	–	0
Huron	5	–	2	–	0	6	–	3	–	0
Dakota Wesleyan	5	–	3	–	0	5	–	3	–	0
South Dakota Mines	3	–	3	–	0	4	–	4	–	0
Black Hills	2	–	4	–	0	5	–	4	–	0
Yankton	2	–	5	–	0	2	–	6	–	0
Sioux Falls	1	–	5	–	0	0	–	7	–	0
General Beadle	0	–	6	–	0	1	–	6	–	0
+ – Conference co-champions

1954 Southern California Intercollegiate Athletic Conference football standings
	Conf.					Overall
Team	W		L		T	W		L		T
Pomona-Claremont $	4	–	0	–	0	8	–	0	–	0
Redlands	2	–	1	–	1	5	–	4	–	1
Occidental	2	–	2	–	0	4	–	4	–	1
Whittier	1	–	2	–	1	3	–	6	–	1
Caltech	0	–	4	–	0	0	–	7	–	0
$ – Conference champion; Pomona-Claremont played Redlands, Occidental, and Caltech each twice; each game counted as one-half in the standings.

1954 Southern Intercollegiate Athletic Conference football standings
	Conf.					Overall
Team	W		L		T	W		L		T
Florida A&M $	4	–	0	–	0	8	–	1	–	0
Morris Brown	5	–	1	–	0	5	–	3	–	0
South Carolina State	5	–	1	–	0	7	–	2	–	0
Xavier (LA)	5	–	1	–	0	6	–	2	–	0
Fort Valley State	4	–	3	–	0	5	–	4	–	0
Allen	3	–	2	–	0	6	–	4	–	0
Fisk	4	–	1	–	0	4	–	4	–	0
Alabama State	4	–	3	–	0	6	–	3	–	0
Knoxville	3	–	1	–	1	5	–	3	–	1
Morehouse	3	–	3	–	0	4	–	4	–	0
Bethune–Cookman	1	–	3	–	0	5	–	3	–	0
Tuskegee	2	–	5	–	1	3	–	5	–	1
Clark (GA)	1	–	7	–	0	1	–	7	–	0
Alabama A&M	2	–	6	–	0	2	–	7	–	0
Lane	0	–	3	–	0	2	–	6	–	0
Benedict	0	–	6	–	0	0	–	7	–	1
$ – Conference champion; Standings were based on Dickinson System ratings.

1954 Southwestern Athletic Conference football standings
	Conf.					Overall
Team	W		L		T	W		L		T
No. 3 Prairie View A&M $	6	–	0	–	0	10	–	1	–	0
No. 4 Southern	5	–	1	–	0	10	–	1	–	0
Langston	4	–	2	–	0	4	–	4	–	1
Texas College	3	–	3	–	0	4	–	6	–	0
Wiley	2	–	4	–	0	5	–	5	–	0
Arkansas AM&N	1	–	5	–	0	2	–	7	–	2
Bishop	0	–	6	–	0	1	–	7	–	0
$ – Conference champion; Rankings from Associated Negro Press

1954 Texas Conference football standings
	Conf.					Overall
Team	W		L		T	W		L		T
Howard Payne $	2	–	0	–	0	9	–	1	–	0
McMurry	1	–	1	–	0	6	–	3	–	1
Eastern New Mexico	0	–	2	–	0	6	–	3	–	0
$ – Conference champion

1954 Virginia Little Seven Conference football standings
	Conf.					Overall
Team	W		L		T	W		L		T
Emory and Henry $	2	–	0	–	0	4	–	3	–	3
Hampden–Sydney	2	–	1	–	0	5	–	3	–	0
Randolph–Macon	1	–	2	–	0	6	–	3	–	0
Bridgewater	0	–	2	–	0	2	–	4	–	1
$ – Conference champion

1954 West Virginia Intercollegiate Athletic Conference football standings
	Conf.					Overall
Team	W		L		T	W		L		T
Morris Harvey $	4	–	0	–	0	8	–	2	–	0
Concord	5	–	2	–	0	5	–	3	–	1
West Virginia Tech	3	–	2	–	0	5	–	4	–	0
Shepherd	2	–	1	–	1	5	–	2	–	1
Potomac State	3	–	3	–	0	3	–	3	–	0
West Liberty State	3	–	4	–	0	4	–	4	–	0
Glenville State	2	–	3	–	1	3	–	3	–	1
Fairmont State	3	–	5	–	0	3	–	5	–	0
West Virginia Wesleyan	2	–	4	–	0	2	–	4	–	1
Salem	2	–	6	–	0	2	–	6	–	0
Bethany (WV) *	1	–	0	–	0	2	–	5	–	0
$ – Conference champion; * – Did not qualify for conference standings Conference standings based on power ratings

1954 Wisconsin State College Conference football standings
	Conf.					Overall
Team	W		L		T	W		L		T
La Crosse State $	4	–	0	–	1	6	–	2	–	1
Platteville State	3	–	1	–	1	4	–	1	–	2
Eau Claire State	5	–	2	–	0	6	–	2	–	0
Stevens Point State	4	–	2	–	0	5	–	2	–	1
River Falls State	3	–	2	–	0	6	–	2	–	0
Milwaukee State	2	–	2	–	1	4	–	4	–	1
Oshkosh State	2	–	2	–	2	2	–	2	–	2
Stout Institute	1	–	3	–	1	2	–	5	–	1
Superior State	0	–	5	–	0	3	–	5	–	0
Whitewater State	0	–	5	–	0	0	–	7	–	0
$ – Conference champion

1954 Yankee Conference football standings
	Conf.					Overall
Team	W		L		T	W		L		T
New Hampshire $	4	–	0	–	0	7	–	1	–	0
Rhode Island	3	–	1	–	0	6	–	2	–	0
Maine	2	–	2	–	0	5	–	2	–	0
Vermont	1	–	1	–	0	5	–	1	–	1
UMass	1	–	3	–	0	4	–	4	–	0
Connecticut	0	–	4	–	0	1	–	8	–	0
$ – Conference champion

== Rankings ==
=== Final AP poll ===
AP ranked Ohio State as No. 1, while the UPI coaches' poll gave the top spot to UCLA. Both wire services' rankings were made at the end of the regular season, and were unaffected by the postseason bowl games. Ohio State and UCLA had two common opponents in 1954; Cal and USC. Ohio State defeated Cal 21–13 and USC 20–7, while UCLA defeated Cal 27–6 and USC 34–0.

Ranking	Team	Record	Conference
1	Ohio State	9–0–0	Big 10
2	UCLA	9–0–0	PCC
3	Oklahoma	10–0–0	Big 7
4	Notre Dame	8–1–0	Indep.
5	Navy	7–2–0	Indep.
6	Mississippi	9–1–0	SEC
7	Army	7–2–0	Indep.
8	Maryland	7–2–1	ACC
9	Wisconsin	7–2–0	Big 10
10	Arkansas	8–2–0	SWC
11	Miami (Florida)	8–1–0	Indep.
12	West Virginia	8–1–0	Southern
13	Auburn	7–3–0	SEC
14	Duke	7–2–1	ACC
15	Michigan	6–3–0	Big 10
16	Virginia Tech	8–0–1	Southern
17	USC	8–3–0	PCC
18	Baylor	7–3–0	SWC
19	Rice	7–3–0	SWC
20	Penn State	7–2–0	Indep.

=== Final Coaches Poll ===
The United Press International poll, taken from a panel of 35 coaches, had UCLA as the number one team beginning with the poll released on October 26. A rival to the AP poll, the UPI prefaced its release with the statement, "The men who know the game the best, the coaches themselves, voted UCLA to the top spot by the slender margin of seven points over Ohio State, the perfect record champions of the Big 10 Conference," The UPI poll was a Top Ten, with a first place vote by a coach being worth 10 points, second worth 9 points, etc. With 350 being the maximum number of points, and 315 being the total for 35 second place votes, the panel was split on whether UCLA or Ohio State was the best team in the nation. The UPI Top Ten Ohio State and UCLA had two common opponents in 1954; Cal and USC. Ohio State defeated Cal 21–13 and USC 20–7, while UCLA defeated Cal 27–6 and USC 34–0.

Ranking	Team
1	UCLA
2	Ohio State
3	Oklahoma
4	Notre Dame
5	Navy
6	Mississippi
7	Army
8	Arkansas
9	Miami (Fla.)
10	Wisconsin
11 (t)	USC
11 (t)	Maryland
11 (t)	Georgia Tech
14	Duke
15	Michigan
16	Penn State
17	SMU
18	Denver
19	Rice
20	Minnesota

== Undefeated seasons ==
Team	Record	Notes
1954 Ohio State Buckeyes football team	10–0	AP national champion
1954 UCLA Bruins football team	9–0	UP national champion
1954 Oklahoma Sooners football team	10–0	Big 7 champion, AP No. 3
1954 VPI Gobblers football team	8–0–1	AP No. 16
1954 Omaha Indians football team	10–0	Tangerine Bowl champion
1954 Trinity Tigers football team	9–0	Gulf Coast champion
1954 Juniata Indians football team	8–0	Part of seven-year run from 1953 to 1959 during which Juniata compiled a record of 50–2–2, including five undefeated seasons
1954 Whitworth Pirates football team	8–0	Evergreen champion, 21-game winning streak
1954 Worcester Tech Engineers football team	6–0	

Other undefeated teams: Ashland, Carleton, Carnegie Tech, Hastings (NE), Hobart, Luther, Pennsylvania Military, Pomona, Southeastern Louisiana, Trinity (CT), Western Colorado, Worcester Tech

== Bowl games ==
=== Major bowls ===
Bowl game	Winning team		Losing team	
Rose Bowl	No. 1 Ohio State	20	No. 17 USC	7
Sugar Bowl	No. 5 Navy	21	No. 6 Ole Miss	0
Cotton Bowl	Georgia Tech	14	No. 10 Arkansas	6
Orange Bowl	No. 14 Duke	34	Nebraska	7

No. 2 UCLA (9–0) and No. 3 Oklahoma (10–0) were idle in bowl season due to conference "no-repeat" rules.

=== Other bowls ===
Bowl game	Winning team		Losing team	
Gator Bowl	No. 13 Auburn	33	No. 18 Baylor	13
Refrigerator Bowl	Delaware	19	Kent State	7
Tangerine Bowl	Omaha	7	Eastern Kentucky	6

== Heisman Trophy voting ==
The Heisman Trophy is given to the year's most outstanding player

Player	School	Position	1st	2nd	3rd	Total
Alan Ameche	Wisconsin	FB	214	157	112	1,068
Kurt Burris	Oklahoma	C	180	111	76	838
Howard Cassady	Ohio State	HB	137	139	121	810
Ralph Guglielmi	Notre Dame	QB	112	128	99	691
Paul Larson	California	QB	50	42	37	271
Dicky Moegle	Rice	HB	36	53	44	258
Jack Ellena	UCLA	OT	23	40	44	193
George Shaw	Oregon	QB	32	33	20	182
Pete Vann	Army	QB	20	22	30	134
Bob McNamara	Minnesota	HB	16	15	26	104

== Statistical leaders ==
=== Individual ===
==== Total offense ====
The following players were the individual leaders in total offense among major college football players during the 1954 season:
1. George Shaw, Oregon, 1,536 yards
2. Paul Larson, California, 1,485 yards
3. Len Dawson, Purdue, 1,384 yards
4. Art Luppino, Arizona, 1,359 yards
5. Gary Glick, Colorado A&M, 1,269 yards
6. Ralph Guglielmi, Notre Dame, 1,257 yards
7. Bobby Freeman, Auburn, 1,132 yards
8. Pete Vann, Army, 1,097 yards
9. Lenny Moore, Penn State, 1,082 yards
10. Eagle Day, Ole Miss, 1,051 yards

==== Passing ====
The following players were the individual leaders in pass completions among major college football players during the 1954 season:
1. Paul Larson, California, 125 of 195 (64.1%), 1,537 yards, 8 interceptions, 10 touchdowns
2. George Shaw, Oregon, 91 of 196 (56.5%), 1,358 yards, 11 interceptions, 10 touchdowns
3. Len Dawson, Purdue, 87 of 167 (52.1%), 1,464 yards, 8 interceptions, 15 touchdowns
4. John Brodie, Stanford, 81 of 163 (49.7%), 937 yards, 16 interceptions, 2 touchdowns
5. Ken Ford, Hardin-Simmons, 78 of 146 (53.4%), 948 yards, 9 interceptions, 7 touchdowns
6. Bill Beagle, Dartmouth, 76 of 145 (52.4%), 867 yards, 10 interceptions, 5 touchdowns
7. David Dungan, Utah, 74 of 128 (57.8%), 862 yards, 4 interceptions, 5 touchdowns
8. Jack Stephans, Holy Cross, 73 of 149 (49.0%), 800 yards, 11 interceptions, 8 touchdowns
9. Mackie Prickett, South Carolina, 68 of 116 (58.6%), 682 yards, 9 interceptions, 1 touchdown
9. Ralph Guglielmi, Notre Dame, 68 of 127 (53.4%), 1,162 yards, 7 interceptions, 6 touchdowns

==== Rushing ====
The following players were the individual leaders in rushing yards among major college football players during the 1954 season:
1. Art Luppino, Arizona, 1,359 yards on 179 carries (7.59 average)
2. Lenny Moore, Penn State, 1,082 yards on 136 yards (7.96 average)
3. Tommy Bell, Army, 1,020 yards on 96 carries (10.62 average)
4. Sam Pino, Boston University, 933 yards on 154 carries (6.06 average) 5. Dicky Moegle, Rice, 905 yards on 144 carries (6.28 average)
6. Dick Imer, Montana, 889 yards on 111 carries (8.01 average)
7. Joe Childress, Auburn, 836 yards on 148 carries (5.65 average)
8. John Bayuk, Colorado, 824 yards on 145 carries (5.68 average)
9. Fred Mahaffey, Denver, 813 yards on 143 carries (5.69 average)
10. Tom Tracy, Tennessee, 794 yards on 116 carries (6.84 average)

==== Receiving ====
The following players were the individual leaders in receptions among major college football players during the 1954 season:
1. Jim Hanifan, California, 44 receptions, 569 yards, 7 touchdowns
2. John Stewart, Stanford, 36 receptions, 577 yards, 2 touchdowns
3. Jim Carmichael, California, 33 receptions, 420 yards, 2 touchdowns
4. Carl Brazell, South Carolina, 29 receptions, 241 yards, 1 touchdown
5. Jerry Mertens, Drake, 28 receptions, 495 yards, 4 touchdowns
5. Jim Pyburn, Auburn, 28 reception, 460 yards, 4 touchdowns
7. Andy Nacrelli, Fordham, 25 receptions, 493 yards, 2 touchdowns
7. Max Pierce, Utah, 25 receptions, 457 yards, 3 touchdowns
7. Larry Ross, Denver, 25 receptions, 378 yards, 4 touchdowns
7. Robert H. Dee, Holy Cross, 25 receptions, 236 yards, 2 touchdowns

==== Scoring ====
The following players were the individual leaders in scoring among major college football players during the 1954 season:
1. Art Luppino, Arizona, 166 points (24 TD, 22 PAT)
2. Buddy Leake, Oklahoma, 79 points (9 TD, 25 PAT)
3. Tommy Bell, Army, 78 points (13 TD)
3. Lenny Moore, Penn State, 78 points (13 TD)
5. Fred Mahaffey, Denver, 73 points (12 TD, 1 PAT)
6. Dicky Moegle, Rice, 72 points (12 TD)
7. Harold "Rusty" Fairly, Denver, 70 points (9 TD, 16 PAT)
8. Carroll Hardy, Colorado, 68 points (9 TD, 14 PAT)
9. Bob Davenport, UCLA, 66 points (11 TD)
9. John Bayuk, Colorado, 66 points (11 TD)
9. Joe Miller, Cincinnati, 66 points (11 TD)
9. Bob McNamara, Minnesota, 66 points (11 TD)
9. Dick James, Oregon, 66 points (11 TD)
9. Earl Smith Jr., Iowa, 66 points (11 TD)

=== Team ===
==== Total offense ====
The following teams were the leaders in total offense in major college football during the 1954 season:
1. Army, 448.7 yards per game
2. Texas Tech, 422.3 yards per game
3. Arizona, 402.0 yards per game
4. Navy, 393.8 yards per game
5. Ole Miss, 386.8 yards per game
6. Notre Dame, 385.3 yards per game
7. Oklahoma, 382.7 yards per game
8. Denver, 371.8 yards per game
9. Boston University, 367.1 yards per game
10. UCLA, 366.6 yards per game

==== Total defense ====
The following teams were the leaders in total defense in major college football during the 1954 season:
1. Ole Miss, 172.3 yards per game
2. Richmond, 174.4 yards per game
3. Clemson, 176.1 yards per game
4. Boston College, 184.6 yards per game
5. Oklahoma, 186.3 yards per game
6. West Virginia, 186.7 yards per game
7. Denver, 188.6 yards per game
8. UCLA, 189.8 yards per game
9. Navy, 190.4 yards per game
10. Cincinnati, 198.4 yards per game

== See also ==
- 1954 College Football All-America Team
