= 1954 Oklahoma Sooners football team =

American college football season

1954 Oklahoma Sooners football

Big 7 champion
- Conference: Big Seven Conference

Ranking
- Coaches: No. 3
- AP: No. 3
- Record: 10–0 (6–0 Big 7)
- Head coach: Bud Wilkinson (8th season)
- Captains: Gene Calame; Gene Mears
- Home stadium: Oklahoma Memorial Stadium

1954 Big Seven Conference football standings
	Conf.					Overall
Team	W		L		T	W		L		T
No. 3 Oklahoma $	6	–	0	–	0	10	–	0	–	0
Nebraska	4	–	2	–	0	6	–	5	–	0
Colorado	3	–	2	–	1	7	–	2	–	1
Missouri	3	–	2	–	1	4	–	5	–	1
Kansas State	3	–	3	–	0	7	–	3	–	0
Iowa State	1	–	5	–	0	3	–	6	–	0
Kansas	0	–	6	–	0	0	–	10	–	0
$ – Conference champion; Rankings from AP Poll

The 1954 Oklahoma Sooners football team (variously "Oklahoma", "OU", or the "Sooners") represented the University of Oklahoma in the 1954 college football season, the sixtieth season of Sooner football. Led by eighth-year head coach Bud Wilkinson, they played their home games at Oklahoma Memorial Stadium in Norman, Oklahoma, and were members of the Big Seven Conference.

The Sooners went undefeated and were ranked third in both final polls, released in late November at the end of the regular season. Because of a conference "no-repeat" rule, Oklahoma did not play in a bowl game. Unranked runner-up Nebraska was invited to the Orange Bowl, and was defeated 34–7 by No. 14 Duke.

== Schedule ==
Date	Opponent	Rank	Site	TV	Result	Attendance	Source
September 18	at No. 12 California*	No. 2	California Memorial Stadium; Berkeley, CA	ABC	W 27–13	48,095	
September 25	No. 20 TCU*	No. 1	Oklahoma Memorial Stadium; Norman, OK		W 21–16	50,878	
October 9	vs. No. 15 Texas*	No. 1	Cotton Bowl; Dallas, TX (rivalry)		W 14–7	76,204	
October 16	at Kansas	No. 1	Memorial Stadium; Lawrence, KS		W 65–0	28,211	
October 23	Kansas State	No. 1	Oklahoma Memorial Stadium; Norman, OK		W 21–0	46,356	
October 30	at Colorado	No. 2	Folsom Field; Boulder, CO		W 13–6	31,247	
November 6	at Iowa State	No. 3	Clyde Williams Stadium; Ames, IA		W 40–0	10,209	
November 13	Missouri	No. 3	Oklahoma Memorial Stadium; Norman, OK (rivalry)		W 34–13	54,173	
November 20	Nebraska	No. 3	Oklahoma Memorial Stadium; Norman, OK (rivalry)		W 55–7	55,172	
November 27	at Oklahoma A&M*	No. 3	Lewis Field; Stillwater, OK (Bedlam)		W 14–0	38,000	
*Non-conference game; Rankings from AP Poll released prior to the game

== Rankings ==
Ranking movements Legend: ██ Increase in ranking ██ Decrease in ranking ( ) = First-place votes
	Week											
Poll	Pre	1	2	3	4	5	6	7	8	9	10	Final
AP	2 (74)	1 (56)	2 (24)	1 (77)	1 (118)	1 (115)	2 (74)	3 (42)	3 (44)	3 (28)	3 (31)	3 (35)

== Roster ==
- E Carl Allison, Sr.
- QB Jimmy Harris, So.
- C Jerry Tubbs, So.

== NFL draft ==
The following players were drafted into the National Football League following the season.

Round	Pick	Player	Position	NFL team
1	2	Max Boydston	End	Chicago Cardinals
1	13	Kurt Burris	Center	Cleveland Browns
3	29	Buddy Leake	Back	Green Bay Packers
16	182	Bob Herndon	Back	Chicago Cardinals
18	217	Steve Champlin	Tackle	Cleveland Browns
22	263	Carl Allison	Back	Detroit Lions
