= 1954 VPI Gobblers football team =

American college football season

1954 VPI Gobblers football
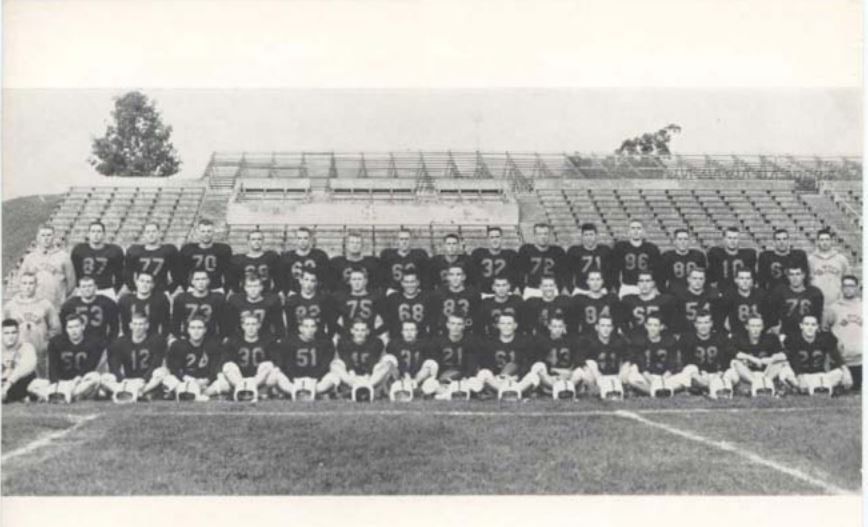
- Conference: Southern Conference

Ranking
- AP: No. 16
- Record: 8–0–1 (3–0–1 SoCon)
- Head coach: Frank Moseley (4th season)
- Home stadium: Miles Stadium

1954 Southern Conference football standings
| | Conf. | | | | | Overall |
| Team | W | | L | | T | W | | L | | T |
|---|---|---|---|---|---|---|---|---|---|---|
| No. 12 West Virginia $ | 3 | – | 0 | – | 0 | 8 | – | 1 | – | 0 |
| Furman | 2 | – | 0 | – | 0 | 5 | – | 5 | – | 0 |
| No. 16 VPI | 3 | – | 0 | – | 1 | 8 | – | 0 | – | 1 |
| Davidson | 2 | – | 1 | – | 0 | 6 | – | 3 | – | 0 |
| VMI | 4 | – | 3 | – | 0 | 4 | – | 6 | – | 0 |
| Richmond | 2 | – | 3 | – | 0 | 5 | – | 4 | – | 0 |
| William & Mary | 1 | – | 2 | – | 2 | 4 | – | 4 | – | 2 |
| George Washington | 0 | – | 4 | – | 1 | 1 | – | 7 | – | 1 |
| The Citadel | 0 | – | 4 | – | 0 | 2 | – | 8 | – | 0 |
$ – Conference champion; Rankings from AP Poll

The 1954 VPI Gobblers football team represented Virginia Polytechnic Institute, now known as Virginia Tech, in the 1954 college football season. The team, coached by Frank Moseley, had an 8–0-1 record. The team was ranked 16th in the final Associated Press poll. Three major college football teams had perfect records in 1954, but the Gobblers only prevailed over one team with a winning record, fellow Southern Conference member Richmond, which was 5–4.

Despite its record, and some interest from bowl scouts, Tech did not earn a berth in a postseason game. There were only seven bowl games, with 14 teams who played in bowl games following the 1954 season.

It was the first undefeated season for Virginia Tech since the 1918 team went 7–0. It also marks the last time that a Virginia Tech team has gone undefeated (although the 1999 team went 11–0 in regular-season play before losing the National Championship game played in the 2000 Sugar Bowl).

The Techmen were 3-0-1 in the conference, with the lone blemish coming in a tie with William & Mary, which finished the year 4-4-2. Tech finished second in the Southern to West Virginia which was 3–0. Those two teams did not face off during the season.

1954 marked the second year of football in the Atlantic Coast Conference, whose eight teams had withdrawn from the Southern Conference. It was Virginia's first year in the ACC. Tech was 4-0 against the teams it played from the ACC, and had it been admitted along with the others, would have tied Duke for the league crown. The Blue Devils also went 4-0 versus the ACC teams it played that year.

Three Tech players were elected to the first-team all-conference squad: end Tom Petty who caught nine passes for 236 yards and five touchdowns; Dickie Beard who led the league in rushing with 647 yards; and future Baltimore Colts star George Preas, a star interior lineman. Howie Wright, injured early in the year, was elected to the second team.

Frank O. Moseley, the 41-year-old head coach, was unanimously named the Associated Press Big-Six coach of the year. (Note: The Big-Six was not a conference, but instead a press-inspired grouping of the six major college athletic programs in the state: Virginia Tech, William & Mary, UVA, VMI, Richmond, and Washington and Lee - ironically a school that did not field a varsity program in 1954). The state newspapers also coined seven other state athletic teams the "Little Seven": Emory and Henry; Hampden Sydney; Randolph-Macon; Bridgewater; Roanoke College (basketball only); and Lynchburg College (basketball only).) The first team all Big-Six team included Beard, Petty and Preas, plus center Jack Prater and guard Billy Kerfoot.

== Schedule ==
| Date | Opponent | Rank | Site | Result | Attendance | Source |
|---|---|---|---|---|---|---|
| September 18 | NC State* | | Miles Stadium; Blacksburg, VA | W 30–21 | 9,000 | |
| September 25 | vs. Wake Forest* | | City Stadium; Richmond, VA (Tobacco Bowl) | W 32–0 | 17,000 | |
| October 2 | at Clemson* | | Memorial Stadium; Clemson, SC | W 18–7 | 14,000 | |
| October 16 | at Richmond | No. 16 | City Stadium; Richmond, VA | W 19–12 | 20,000 | |
| October 23 | vs. Virginia* | No. 14 | Victory Stadium; Roanoke, VA (rivalry) | W 6–0 | 17,000 | |
| October 30 | William & Mary^{†} | No. 14 | Miles Stadium; Blacksburg, VA | T 7–7 | 16,000 | |
| November 5 | at George Washington | No. 18 | Griffith Stadium; Washington, DC | W 20–13 | 18,586 | |
| November 13 | Waynesburg* | No. 15 | Miles Stadium; Blacksburg, VA | W 20–6 | 6,000 | |
| November 25 | vs. VMI | No. 16 | Victory Stadium; Roanoke, VA (rivalry) | W 46–9 | 26,000 | |
*Non-conference game; ^{†}Homecoming; Rankings from AP Poll released prior to the game

== Rankings ==
Ranking movements Legend: ██ Increase in ranking ██ Decrease in ranking — = Not ranked
| | Week | | | | | | | | | | | |
| Poll | Pre | 1 | 2 | 3 | 4 | 5 | 6 | 7 | 8 | 9 | 10 | Final |
|---|---|---|---|---|---|---|---|---|---|---|---|---|
| AP | — | — | — | 19 | 16 | 14 | 14 | 18 | 15 | 15 | 16 | 16 |

== Game summaries ==
=== NC State ===
Howie Wright scored two touchdowns to lead the Gobblers to their first victory of the year, beating NC State, 30–21. After falling behind 7–0 in the first quarter, Wright took a handoff from quarterback Johnny Dean and raced 67 yards to knot the score. The Tech defense did not allow the Wolfpack a first down in the second or third quarters, and in fact put the Gobblers in front 9–7 when George Preas tossed the NC State quarterback in the end zone for a safety. On the drive following the free kick, Bill Cranwell took the ball in from the six, capping a 12-play drive. After leading 16–7 at the half, the Techmen scored on another run by Wright, this one from the one. After NC State matched that score with a touchdown return on the ensuing kickoff, quarterback Dean gave the Gobblers their final tally from one-yard out. The Gobblers had taken the ball into NC State territory after an interception by Cranwell. They held on for the 30–21 win. VPI had 317 yards on the ground, and had a total of 19 first downs. Dickie Beard was 4-for-4 on extra point tries.

=== Wake Forest ===
Howie Wright and Johnny Dean each accounted for two touchdowns as the Gobblers shut out Wake Forest in the sixth Tobacco Bowl played in Richmond, Virginia. Both of Wright's scores were over 60 yards, with the first coming on a 62-yard completion by Dean, and the second on a 64-yard jaunt off right tackle. Dean also had a one-yard score to begin the onslaught in the first quarter. The Tech defense was brutal against the Wake air attack, intercepting six passes, two of those by Wright, who plays in both the offensive and defensive backfields. Bill Cranwell and Billy Anderson also scored for the Techmen.

=== Clemson ===
Tech beat its third Atlantic Coast Conference team in three weeks when it ran up an 18–0 lead by halftime and held on for an 18–7 upset win over Clemson. Johnny Dean scored twice following a first period touchdown by Dickie Beard. Dean also had an interception. Beard had a total of 74 yards on 17 carriers. The win was the first for the Gobblers over Clemson in five tries stretching over 20 years.

=== Richmond ===
Sixteenth-ranked Richmond Tech had to come from behind in the second quarter, and overcome the loss of its first-string quarterback, to win against the Richmond Spiders. Johnny Dean, who had starred for the Gobblers in its first three wins, scored the game's first touchdown, but had to be taken from the field on a stretcher after breaking his ankle. Howie Wright was also injured and had to leave the game. It was the Gobblers' second win in Richmond City Stadium in three games.

=== Virginia ===
Dickie Cranwell passed 20-yards to Grover Jones in the end zone to cap a 73-yard second period drive which accounted for all the scoring in the 6–0 rivalry win for 14th-ranked VPI over Virginia. The game was played at Victory Stadium in Roanoke. Cranwell, a sophomore, was starting his first game in place of quarterback Johnny Dean. Dickie Beard led the defense, intercepting three UVA passes. The game assured the Gobblers of an undefeated record against Atlantic Coast Conference (ACC) teams. 1954 was Virginia's first season in the ACC, a very sore subject with the Hokies. UVA, instead of Tech, had been the new conference's selection to bridge the gap between Maryland and the Carolinas. (At the time, Maryland's Terrapins were a national power, important for the prominence of the conference. So the league opted to become a four-state, instead of two-state league. However, it limited the size to eight schools). By the end of the season, the Gobblers made a satirical claim that it was in fact the ACC champion, since it had won as many games against conference teams as any other team in the conference. In reality, Tech did not beat Maryland, which finished as the actual conference champion with a 4–0 record. So its claim should have been it was co-champion.

=== William & Mary ===
Virginia Tech scored a late touchdown to escape with a 7–7 tie against William & Mary, enough to preserve ts undefeated status, but not enough to keep its hopes of a perfect season alive. The game was played before the largest crowd (16,000) to ever watch a game in Blacksburg. Billy Anderson scored from three yards out with just under four minutes remaining, and Dickie Beard was successful on the extra point kick to avoid completely ruining homecoming for the Tech faithful. William & Mary scored early in the game on a 55-yard run by the Tribe's Doug Henley. While Tech's offense was dominating, rolling up 314 yards on the ground, the team was unable to move the ball when it counted until the final drive. The Tech defense was also dominating aside from the one long run in the first quarter. Aside from the long touchdown, the Techmen only gave up another 36 yards.

=== George Washington ===
Tech jumped out to a 14–0 lead and held on against the George Washington in a game played on a Friday night at Griffith Stadium in Washington, D.C. The Hokies hit on six of seven passes and three of those completions were touchdowns. Dickie Cranwell threw two TDS, one to Grover Jones and one to Tom Petty. Billy Anderson threw a halfback pass to a wide-open Bob Luttrell for the third score.

=== Waynesburg ===
Waynesburg gave Tech all it could handle in the first half before succumbing to the heavily favored Gobblers 20–6. Waynesburg, coming into Blacksburg with a five-game winning streak, struck first, scoring on the fifth play after Tech coughed up the ball on its own 26. The extra point failed, but the Yellow Jackets held on to the 6–0 lead until less than one minute to play in the first half. With 59 seconds left in the stanza, QB Billy Cranwell threw to Tom Petty for the score, and freshman Wayne Webster successfully kicked the extra point. In the second half, Dickie Beard was part of both Tech touchdowns, throwing a halfback pass to Petty for one score, and returning an intercepted pass for a 79-yard touchdown to wrap things up. (Waynesburg was a lower-division program, eligible at the time to place its players on the "Little All-America" team, now composed of Division II, Division III and NAIA teams).

=== VMI ===
In what was referred to as the "Military Clash of the South," the Gobblers turned on the burners after a slow first quarter to VMI, 46–9 in Roanoke's Victory Stadium in the traditional Thanksgiving Day tilt. VMI held a 2–0 lead, and was threatening to score an offensive score when the Techmen held at their six. Halfback Dickie Beard then threw his second pass of the season, and the second one resulting in a touchdown, when the Gobblers caught VMI off-guard on a 69-yard trick play that wound up in Tom Petty's hands. Tech led 14–9 when Dick Ebert scored on a 12-yard run. Don Divers then scored the next two touchdowns for the Gobblers, both on intercepted pass returns, the first for 42 yards and the other for 67. Cranwell hit Petty for his fifth receiving score of the year, Beard ran for a touchdown. Bobby Scruggs ran for the final tally.

== Roster ==
The following players were members of the 1954 football team.

VPI 1954 roster
| Quarterbacks: Don Camp; William C. Cranwell; Johnny Dean; Bob McCoy; Guards: Gordon Derwood "Sonny" Bowman II; Pat Luis Carpenito; Robert J. Cruickshank; Bill Daley; James H. Haren; William Duncan Kerfoot; James Patrick Locke; Phillip William Unger; Ernie Wolfe; Tackles: Franklin Dewey Brown; Thomas John Dalzell; William Edward Jamerson; George Jones; Joseph Yadon Longmire; George Preas; Thomas Carl Richards; Ted Uzelac | Centers: Charles Cuba; Jack Warren Prater; Bob Wray; Ends: James Lupton Hedrick; John Herndon; Grover Cleveland Jones III; Robert Stevens Luttrell; Doug Mullins; Thomas R. Petty; Roger Winfield Simmons; Billy Tilling; Halfbacks: William R. Anderson; Richard VanMetre "Dickie" Beard; Hugh David Ebert; Robert Earl Scruggs; Bobby Wolfenden; Howard "Howie" Wright | Fullbacks: Leo Burke; Hayes Howell Burleson; Raymond Donald Divers; Donald Gaylon Sink; Substitutes: Herbert Lee Blankenship; John Rufus Hall; Frank Webster |
