= 1954 Colorado Buffaloes football team =

American college football season

1954 Colorado Buffaloes football
- Conference: Big Seven Conference
- Record: 7–2–1 (3–2–1 Big 7)
- Head coach: Dallas Ward (7th season)
- Captain: Game captains
- Home stadium: Folsom Field

1954 Big Seven Conference football standings
	Conf.					Overall
Team	W		L		T	W		L		T
No. 3 Oklahoma $	6	–	0	–	0	10	–	0	–	0
Nebraska	4	–	2	–	0	6	–	5	–	0
Colorado	3	–	2	–	1	7	–	2	–	1
Missouri	3	–	2	–	1	4	–	5	–	1
Kansas State	3	–	3	–	0	7	–	3	–	0
Iowa State	1	–	5	–	0	3	–	6	–	0
Kansas	0	–	6	–	0	0	–	10	–	0
$ – Conference champion; Rankings from AP Poll

The 1954 Colorado Buffaloes football team was an American football team that represented the University of Colorado as a member of the Big Seven Conference during the 1954 college football season. Led by seventh-year head coach Dallas Ward, the Buffaloes compiled an overall record of 7–2–1 with a mark of 3–2–1 in conference play, tying for third place in the Big 7.

== Schedule ==
Date	Opponent	Rank	Site	Result	Attendance	Source
September 18	Drake*		Folsom Field; Boulder, CO	W 61–0	14,500	
September 25	Colorado A&M*		Folsom Field; Boulder, CO (rivalry)	W 46–0	26,500	
October 2	at Kansas		Memorial Stadium; Lawrence, KS	W 27–0	24,000	
October 9	at Arizona*		Arizona Stadium; Tucson, AZ	W 40–18	25,000	
October 16	at Iowa State	No. 17	Clyde Williams Field; Ames, IA	W 20–0	17,000	
October 23	Nebraska^{†}	No. 11	Folsom Field; Boulder, CO (rivalry)	L 6–20	32,500	
October 30	No. 2 Oklahoma		Folsom Field; Boulder, CO	L 6–13	32,600	
November 6	at Missouri		Memorial Stadium; Columbia, MO	T 19–19	24,000	
November 13	at Utah*		Ute Stadium; Salt Lake City, UT (rivalry)	W 20–7	10,111	
November 20	Kansas State		Folsom Field; Boulder, CO (rivalry)	W 38–14	23,600	
*Non-conference game; ^{†}Homecoming; Rankings from AP Poll released prior to the game
