= 1954 Virginia Cavaliers football team =

American college football season

1954 Virginia Cavaliers football
- Conference: Atlantic Coast Conference
- Record: 3–6 (0–2 ACC)
- Head coach: Ned McDonald (2nd season)
- Captain: Henry Strempek
- Home stadium: Scott Stadium

1954 Atlantic Coast Conference football standings
| | Conf. | | | | | Overall |
| Team | W | | L | | T | W | | L | | T |
|---|---|---|---|---|---|---|---|---|---|---|
| No. 14 Duke $ | 4 | – | 0 | – | 0 | 8 | – | 2 | – | 1 |
| No. 8 Maryland | 4 | – | 0 | – | 1 | 7 | – | 2 | – | 1 |
| North Carolina | 4 | – | 2 | – | 0 | 4 | – | 5 | – | 1 |
| South Carolina | 3 | – | 3 | – | 0 | 6 | – | 4 | – | 0 |
| Clemson | 1 | – | 2 | – | 0 | 5 | – | 5 | – | 0 |
| Wake Forest | 1 | – | 4 | – | 1 | 2 | – | 7 | – | 1 |
| Virginia | 0 | – | 2 | – | 0 | 3 | – | 6 | – | 0 |
| NC State | 0 | – | 4 | – | 0 | 2 | – | 8 | – | 0 |
$ – Conference champion; Rankings from AP poll

The 1954 Virginia Cavaliers football team represented the University of Virginia during the 1954 college football season. The Cavaliers were led by second-year head coach Ned McDonald and played their home games at Scott Stadium in Charlottesville, Virginia. This was their first year competing in the Atlantic Coast Conference, which was in its second year of existence. Virginia failed to pick up its first ACC win, finishing 0–2 against conference opponents.

== Schedule ==
| Date | Opponent | Site | Result | Attendance | Source |
|---|---|---|---|---|---|
| September 25 | Lehigh* | Scott Stadium; Charlottesville, VA | W 27–21 | 12,000 | |
| October 2 | George Washington* | Scott Stadium; Charlottesville, VA | W 14–13 | 14,000 | |
| October 9 | at No. 12 Penn State* | New Beaver Field; University Park, PA | L 7–34 | 21,820 | |
| October 16 | VMI*^{†} | Scott Stadium; Charlottesville, VA | W 21–0 | 17,000 | |
| October 23 | vs. No. 14 VPI* | Victory Stadium; Roanoke, VA (rivalry) | L 0–6 | 17,000 | |
| October 30 | at No. 5 Army* | Michie Stadium; West Point, NY | L 20–21 | 20,500 | |
| November 13 | at South Carolina | Carolina Stadium; Columbia, SC | L 0–27 | 19,000 | |
| November 20 | North Carolina | Scott Stadium; Charlottesville, VA (South's Oldest Rivalry) | L 14–26 | 15,000 | |
| November 27 | No. 12 West Virginia* | Scott Stadium; Charlottesville, VA | L 10–14 | 10,000 | |
*Non-conference game; ^{†}Homecoming; Rankings from AP Poll released prior to the game
