= 1954 Richmond Spiders football team =

American college football season

1954 Richmond Spiders football
- Conference: Southern Conference
- Record: 5–4 (2–3 SoCon)
- Head coach: Ed Merrick (4th season)
- Captains: Bob Sgro; Billy Thacker
- Home stadium: City Stadium

1954 Southern Conference football standings
	Conf.					Overall
Team	W		L		T	W		L		T
No. 12 West Virginia $	3	–	0	–	0	8	–	1	–	0
Furman	2	–	0	–	0	5	–	5	–	0
No. 16 VPI	3	–	0	–	1	8	–	0	–	1
Davidson	2	–	1	–	0	6	–	3	–	0
VMI	4	–	3	–	0	4	–	6	–	0
Richmond	2	–	3	–	0	5	–	4	–	0
William & Mary	1	–	2	–	2	4	–	4	–	2
George Washington	0	–	4	–	1	1	–	7	–	1
The Citadel	0	–	4	–	0	2	–	8	–	0
$ – Conference champion; Rankings from AP Poll

The 1954 Richmond Spiders football team was an American football team that represented the University of Richmond as a member of the Southern Conference (SoCon) during the 1954 college football season. In their fourth season under head coach Ed Merrick, Richmond compiled a 5–4 record, with a mark of 2–3 in conference play, finishing in sixth place in the SoCon.

== Schedule ==
Date	Opponent	Site	Result	Attendance	Source
September 18	Randolph–Macon*	City Stadium; Richmond, VA	W 46–0	6,000	
September 24	Hampden–Sydney*	City Stadium; Richmond, VA	W 40–0	10,000	
October 2	VMI	City Stadium; Richmond, VA (rivalry)	L 6–19	6,000	
October 9	at The Citadel	Johnson Hagood Stadium; Charleston, SC	W 26–0	5,400	
October 16	No. 16 VPI	City Stadium; Richmond, VA	L 12–19	20,000	
October 29	at George Washington	Griffith Stadium; Washington, DC	W 7–0	7,112	
November 6	Wake Forest*^{†}	City Stadium; Richmond, VA	W 13–0	8,000	
November 13	at NC State*	Riddick Stadium; Raleigh, NC	L 6–14	7,500	
November 25	William & Mary	City Stadium; Richmond, VA (rivalry)	L 0–2	9,000	
*Non-conference game; ^{†}Homecoming; Rankings from AP Poll released prior to the game
