= 1954 Missouri Tigers football team =

American college football season

1954 Missouri Tigers football
- Conference: Big Seven Conference
- Record: 4–5–1 (3–2–1 Big 7)
- Head coach: Don Faurot (17th season)
- Home stadium: Memorial Stadium

1954 Big Seven Conference football standings
	Conf.					Overall
Team	W		L		T	W		L		T
No. 3 Oklahoma $	6	–	0	–	0	10	–	0	–	0
Nebraska	4	–	2	–	0	6	–	5	–	0
Colorado	3	–	2	–	1	7	–	2	–	1
Missouri	3	–	2	–	1	4	–	5	–	1
Kansas State	3	–	3	–	0	7	–	3	–	0
Iowa State	1	–	5	–	0	3	–	6	–	0
Kansas	0	–	6	–	0	0	–	10	–	0
$ – Conference champion; Rankings from AP Poll

The 1954 Missouri Tigers football team was an American football team that represented the University of Missouri in the Big Seven Conference (Big 7) during the 1954 college football season. The team compiled a 4–5–1 record (3–2–1 against Big 7 opponents), finished in a tie for third place in the Big 7, and was outscored by its opponents by a combined total of 261 to 198. Don Faurot was the head coach for the 17th of 19 seasons. The team played its home games at Memorial Stadium in Columbia, Missouri.

The team's statistical leaders included Robert Bauman with 293 rushing yards, Vic Eaton with 774 passing yards and 688 yards of total offense, Harold Burnine with 405 receiving yards, and Jack Fox with 47 points scored.

== Schedule ==
Date	Opponent	Site	Result	Attendance	Source
September 25	at Purdue*	Ross–Ade Stadium; West Lafayette, IN	L 0–31	25,000	
October 2	at Kansas State	Memorial Stadium; Manhattan, KS	W 35–7	21,500	
October 9	SMU*	Memorial Stadium; Columbia, MO	L 6–25	27,500	
October 16	Indiana*	Memorial Stadium; Columbia, MO	W 20–14	22,972	
October 23	Iowa State	Memorial Stadium; Columbia, MO (rivalry)	W 32–14	18,869	
October 30	at Nebraska	Memorial Stadium; Lincoln, NE (rivalry)	L 19–25	35,000	
November 6	Colorado	Memorial Stadium; Columbia, MO	T 19–19	24,000	
November 13	at No. 3 Oklahoma	Oklahoma Memorial Stadium; Norman, OK (rivalry)	L 13–34	54,173	
November 20	Kansas	Memorial Stadium; Columbia, MO (Border War)	W 41–18		
November 25	at No. 10 Maryland*	Byrd Stadium; College Park, MD	L 13–74	20,000	
*Non-conference game; Rankings from AP Poll released prior to the game
