= 1954 George Washington Colonials football team =

American college football season

1954 George Washington Colonials football
- Conference: Southern Conference
- Record: 1–7–1 (0–4–1 SoCon)
- Head coach: Bo Sherman (3rd season)
- Home stadium: Griffith Stadium

1954 Southern Conference football standings
| | Conf. | | | | | Overall |
| Team | W | | L | | T | W | | L | | T |
|---|---|---|---|---|---|---|---|---|---|---|
| No. 12 West Virginia $ | 3 | – | 0 | – | 0 | 8 | – | 1 | – | 0 |
| Furman | 2 | – | 0 | – | 0 | 5 | – | 5 | – | 0 |
| No. 16 VPI | 3 | – | 0 | – | 1 | 8 | – | 0 | – | 1 |
| Davidson | 2 | – | 1 | – | 0 | 6 | – | 3 | – | 0 |
| VMI | 4 | – | 3 | – | 0 | 4 | – | 6 | – | 0 |
| Richmond | 2 | – | 3 | – | 0 | 5 | – | 4 | – | 0 |
| William & Mary | 1 | – | 2 | – | 2 | 4 | – | 4 | – | 2 |
| George Washington | 0 | – | 4 | – | 1 | 1 | – | 7 | – | 1 |
| The Citadel | 0 | – | 4 | – | 0 | 2 | – | 8 | – | 0 |
$ – Conference champion; Rankings from AP Poll

The 1954 George Washington Colonials football team was an American football team that represented George Washington University as part of the Southern Conference during the 1954 college football season. In their third season under head coach Bo Sherman, the team compiled a 1–7–1 record (0–4–1 in the SoCon).

== Schedule ==
| Date | Opponent | Site | Result | Attendance | Source |
|---|---|---|---|---|---|
| September 18 | at Wake Forest* | Groves Stadium; Wake Forest, NC | L 0–14 | 5,000 | |
| September 25 | VMI | George Washington HS Stadium; Alexandria, VA | L 14–16 | 5,000 | |
| October 2 | at Virginia* | Scott Stadium; Charlottesville, VA | L 13–14 | 14,000 | |
| October 9 | at No. 16 West Virginia | Mountaineer Field; Morgantown, WV | L 7–13 | 20,000 | |
| October 16 | at Penn* | Franklin Field; Philadelphia, PA | W 32–27 | 24,432 | |
| October 22 | William & Mary | Griffith Stadium; Washington, DC | T 13–13 | 20,000 | |
| October 29 | Richmond | Griffith Stadium; Washington, DC | L 0–7 | 7,112 | |
| November 5 | No. 18 VPI | Griffith Stadium; Washington, DC | L 13–20 | 18,586 | |
| November 20 | at No. 13 Maryland* | Byrd Stadium; College Park, MD | L 6–48 | 23,000 | |
*Non-conference game; Rankings from AP Poll released prior to the game
