= 1954 Kansas State Wildcats football team =

American college football season

1954 Kansas State Wildcats football
- Conference: Big Seven Conference
- Record: 7–3 (3–3 Big 7)
- Head coach: Bill Meek (4th season)
- Home stadium: Memorial Stadium

1954 Big Seven Conference football standings
	Conf.					Overall
Team	W		L		T	W		L		T
No. 3 Oklahoma $	6	–	0	–	0	10	–	0	–	0
Nebraska	4	–	2	–	0	6	–	5	–	0
Colorado	3	–	2	–	1	7	–	2	–	1
Missouri	3	–	2	–	1	4	–	5	–	1
Kansas State	3	–	3	–	0	7	–	3	–	0
Iowa State	1	–	5	–	0	3	–	6	–	0
Kansas	0	–	6	–	0	0	–	10	–	0
$ – Conference champion; Rankings from AP Poll

The 1954 Kansas State Wildcats football team represented Kansas State University in the 1954 college football season. The team's head football coach was Bill Meek, in his fourth and final year at the helm of the Wildcats. The Wildcats played their home games in Memorial Stadium. The Wildcats finished the season with a 7–3 record with a 3–3 record in conference play. They finished in fifth place in the Big Seven Conference. The Wildcats scored 191 points and gave up 154 points. The Wildcats did not outscore their opponents again until 1969. 1954 was Kansas State's last winning season until 1970.

== Schedule ==
Date	Time	Opponent	Site	Result	Attendance	Source
September 18		Colorado A&M*	Memorial Stadium; Manhattan, KS	W 29–0	10,500–12,000	
September 25		at Wyoming*	War Memorial Stadium; Laramie, WY	W 21–13	9,042	
October 2		Missouri	Memorial Stadium; Manhattan, KS	L 7–35	21,500	
October 9		at Nebraska	Memorial Stadium; Lincoln, NE (rivalry)	W 7–3	34,000	
October 16		at Tulsa*	Skelly Stadium; Tulsa, OK	W 20–13	8,000	
October 23		at No. 1 Oklahoma	Oklahoma Memorial Stadium; Norman, OK	L 0–21	46,356	
October 30		Kansas	Memorial Stadium; Manhattan, KS (rivalry)	W 28–26	21,000	
November 5	8:00 p.m.	at Drake*	Drake Stadium; Des Moines, IA	W 53–18	2,500	
November 13	2:00 p.m.	Iowa State^{†}	Memorial Stadium; Manhattan, KS (rivalry)	W 12–7	14,347	
November 20		at Colorado	Folsom Field; Boulder, CO (rivalry)	L 14–38	23,600	
*Non-conference game; ^{†}Homecoming; Rankings from AP Poll released prior to the game; All times are in Central time
