= Bill Glassford =

American football player and coach (1914–2016)

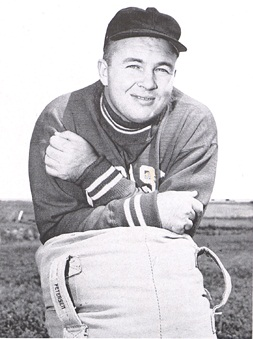
- Glassford from the 1951 Cornhusker

Biographical details
- Born: March 8, 1914; Lancaster, Ohio, U.S.
- Died: September 19, 2016 (aged 102); Scottsdale, Arizona, U.S.
- Education: University of Pittsburgh (1936)

Playing career
- 1934–1936: Pittsburgh
- 1937: Cincinnati Bengals (AFL II)
- Positions: Fullback, guard

Coaching career (HC unless noted)
- 1938–1939: Manhattan (assistant)
- 1940–1941: Carnegie Tech (assistant)
- 1942: Yale (line)
- 1945: Miami NAS
- 1946–1948: New Hampshire
- 1949–1955: Nebraska

Head coaching record
- Overall: 51–42–4
- Bowls: 0–2

Accomplishments and honors

Championships
- 1 New England Conference (1946); 2 Yankee Conference (1947–1948)

Awards
- First-team All-American (1936); First-team All-Eastern (1936)

James William Glassford (March 8, 1914 – September 19, 2016) was an American football player and coach, who served as head coach for the New Hampshire Wildcats and Nebraska Cornhuskers.

== Biography ==
Glassford was born in Lancaster, Ohio, and attended the University of Pittsburgh where he played football, lettering from 1934 through 1936. He earned first-team All-American status at guard in 1936, for the Panthers team that won the 1937 Rose Bowl. He was a member of Phi Delta Theta fraternity and graduated in 1937 with a degree in business administration. He was drafted in the fourth round of the 1937 NFL Draft. Also in 1937, he played for the Cincinnati Bengals of the second American Football League. From 1938 through 1942, Glassford coached football at three different colleges. During World War II, he served in the United States Navy.

From 1946 to 1948, Glassford was head football coach at the University of New Hampshire, where he compiled a 19–5–1 record, including an 8–1 record in 1947 for the Wildcats. From 1949 to 1955, he was head coach for the University of Nebraska–Lincoln, where he compiled a 31–35–3 record. His three winning seasons there (1950, 1952, and 1954) were the only winning seasons the program had between 1941 and 1961. In 1955, he led the Cornhuskers to their first-ever Orange Bowl, where they lost to Duke, 34–7. Glassford coached three All-Americans in Tom Novak (1949), Bobby Reynolds (1950), and Jerry Minnick (1952).

Glassford retired from coaching after the 1955 season and went into private business in Arizona. He was inducted into the Nebraska Football Hall of Fame in 2002, and turned 100 in 2014. Glassford died in Scottsdale, Arizona, at the age of 102, and was at that time the oldest still-living former pro player, and one of only seven total to have lived a century.

== Head coaching record ==
Year	Team	Overall	Conference	Standing	Bowl/playoffs	Coaches^{#}	AP^{°}
Miami Naval Air Station (Independent) (1945)
1945	Miami MAS	1–2					
Miami MAS:		1–2					
New Hampshire Wildcats (New England Conference) (1946)
1946	New Hampshire	6–1–1	3–0–1	T–1st			
New Hampshire Wildcats (Yankee Conference) (1947–1948)
1947	New Hampshire	8–1	4–0	1st	L Glass†		
1948	New Hampshire	5–3	3–1	1st			
New Hampshire:		19–5–1	10–1–1				
Nebraska Cornhuskers (Big Seven Conference) (1949–1955)
1949	Nebraska	4–5	3–3	T–3rd			
1950	Nebraska	6–2–1	4–2	2nd		T–20	17
1951	Nebraska	2–8	2–4	T–4th			
1952	Nebraska	5–4–1	3–2–1	3rd			
1953	Nebraska	3–6–1	2–4	T–4th			
1954	Nebraska	6–5	4–2	2nd	L Orange		
1955	Nebraska	5–5	5–1	2nd			
Nebraska:		31–35–3	23–18–1				
Total:		51–42–4					
National championship Conference title Conference division title or championship game berth
^{#}Rankings from final Coaches Poll.; ^{°}Rankings from final AP Poll.

† While listed in NCAA records, the Glass Bowl is not considered an NCAA-sanctioned bowl game.
