= 1955 Orange Bowl =

American college football game

- 21st Orange Bowl
| Duke Blue Devils | Nebraska Cornhuskers |
| (7–2–1) | (6–4) |
| ACC | MVIAA |
| 34 | 7 |
| Head coach: William Murray | Head coach: Bill Glassford |
| AP / Coaches; 14 / 14 |
| | 1 | 2 | 3 | 4 | Total |
|---|---|---|---|---|---|
| Duke | 0 | 14 | 6 | 14 | 34 |
| Nebraska | 0 | 0 | 7 | 0 | 7 |
- Date: January 1, 1955
- Season: 1954
- Stadium: Miami Orange Bowl
- Location: Miami, Florida
- Favorite: Duke by 14
- Referee: Cliff Ogden (MVIAA)
- Attendance: 68,750

United States TV coverage
- Network: CBS
- Announcers: Bob Neal

The 1955 Orange Bowl was the twenty-first edition of the college football bowl game, held on January 1, 1955 at the Miami Orange Bowl in Miami, Florida. It matched the Duke Blue Devils of the Atlantic Coast Conference and the Nebraska Cornhuskers of the MVIAA. In the first Orange Bowl appearance for each team, fourteenth-ranked Duke won 34–7 in front of a record crowd.

== Teams ==
=== Duke ===
The Blue Devils won all four of their conference games; they tied Purdue and lost to both Army and Navy. This was Duke's fourth bowl appearance and its first in ten years. United States Vice President Richard Nixon, an alumnus of the Duke University School of Law, attended the game.

=== Nebraska ===
Nebraska entered 6–4, the MVIAA runner-up to undefeated Oklahoma. NU lost to OU 55–7 in the regular season's penultimate week, but the Sooners were not invited to the Orange Bowl as conference rules prevented consecutive appearances. Nebraska was making its second bowl appearance and first in fourteen years.

== Game ==
Heavily favored Duke opened the scoring early in the second quarter, and intercepted Nebraska quarterback Don Erway on NU's ensuing drive to set up another touchdown, taking a 14–0 lead into halftime. Early in the second half, the Cornhuskers took advantage of a botched Blue Devils punt to cut the deficit in half, but it would be NU's only points of the game. Duke took control behind All-American running back Bob Pascal, who both teams with ninety-one rushing yards. Three late Blue Devils touchdowns sealed a dominant victory.

=== Scoring summary ===
| Qtr | Team | Detail | Duke | NU |
|---|---|---|---|---|
| 2 | Duke | Bob Pascal 2-yd run (Jim Nelson kick) | 7 | 0 |
| 2 | Duke | Jerry Kocourek 5-yd pass from Jerry Barger (Nelson kick) | 14 | 0 |
| 3 | NU | Don Comstock 3-yd run (Bob Smith kick) | 14 | 7 |
| 3 | Duke | Sonny Sorrell 5-yd pass from Barger (kick failed) | 20 | 7 |
| 4 | Duke | Nick McKeithan 1-yd run (Nelson kick) | 27 | 7 |
| 4 | Duke | Sam Eberdt 3-yd run (Nelson kick) | 34 | 7 |

=== Team statistics ===
| Statistic | Duke | Nebraska |
|---|---|---|
| First downs | 23 | 6 |
| Rushes–yards | 64–288 | 34–84 |
| Comp.–att.–yards | 7–13–82 | 1–9–26 |
| Total offense | 370 | 110 |
| Turnovers | 1 | 2 |
| Punts–average | 5–23.6 | 7–28.9 |
| Penalties–yards | 2–30 | 2–20 |
