= 1954 The Citadel Bulldogs football team =

American college football season

1954 The Citadel Bulldogs football
- Conference: Southern Conference
- Record: 2–8 (0–4 SoCon)
- Head coach: John D. McMillan (2nd season)
- Home stadium: Johnson Hagood Stadium

1954 Southern Conference football standings
	Conf.					Overall
Team	W		L		T	W		L		T
No. 12 West Virginia $	3	–	0	–	0	8	–	1	–	0
Furman	2	–	0	–	0	5	–	5	–	0
No. 16 VPI	3	–	0	–	1	8	–	0	–	1
Davidson	2	–	1	–	0	6	–	3	–	0
VMI	4	–	3	–	0	4	–	6	–	0
Richmond	2	–	3	–	0	5	–	4	–	0
William & Mary	1	–	2	–	2	4	–	4	–	2
George Washington	0	–	4	–	1	1	–	7	–	1
The Citadel	0	–	4	–	0	2	–	8	–	0
$ – Conference champion; Rankings from AP Poll

The 1954 The Citadel Bulldogs football team represented The Citadel, The Military College of South Carolina in the 1954 college football season. John D. McMillan served as head coach for the second season. The Bulldogs played as members of the Southern Conference and played home games at Johnson Hagood Stadium.

== Schedule ==
Date	Opponent	Site	Result	Attendance	Source
September 25	Elon*	Johnson Hagood Stadium; Charleston, SC	W 21–13	9,000	
October 2	Davidson	Johnson Hagood Stadium; Charleston, SC	L 0–13	6,700	
October 9	Richmond^{†}	Johnson Hagood Stadium; Charleston, SC	L 0–26	5,400	
October 16	at Furman	Sirrine Stadium; Greenville, SC (rivalry)	L 20–31	8,000	
October 23	Presbyterian*	Johnson Hagood Stadium; Charleston, SC	L 19–20	6,000	
October 29	vs. Wofford*	County Fairgrounds; Orangeburg, SC	W 14–13		
November 6	Newberry*	Johnson Hagood Stadium; Charleston, SC	L 14–20	4,500	
November 13	at VMI	Wilson Field; Lexington, VA (rivalry)	L 0–42		
November 27	at Clemson*	Memorial Stadium; Clemson, SC	L 0–59	1,500	
December 4	South Carolina*	Johnson Hagood Stadium; Charleston, SC	L 6–19	5,500	
*Non-conference game; ^{†}Homecoming
