= 1954 Kansas Jayhawks football team =

American college football season

1954 Kansas Jayhawks football
- Conference: Big Seven Conference
- Record: 0–10 (0–6 Big 7)
- Head coach: Chuck Mather (1st season)
- Captain: Bud Bixler
- Home stadium: Memorial Stadium

1954 Big Seven Conference football standings
	Conf.					Overall
Team	W		L		T	W		L		T
No. 3 Oklahoma $	6	–	0	–	0	10	–	0	–	0
Nebraska	4	–	2	–	0	6	–	5	–	0
Colorado	3	–	2	–	1	7	–	2	–	1
Missouri	3	–	2	–	1	4	–	5	–	1
Kansas State	3	–	3	–	0	7	–	3	–	0
Iowa State	1	–	5	–	0	3	–	6	–	0
Kansas	0	–	6	–	0	0	–	10	–	0
$ – Conference champion; Rankings from AP Poll

The 1954 Kansas Jayhawks football team represented the University of Kansas in the Big Seven Conference during the 1954 college football season. In their first season under head coach Chuck Mather, the Jayhawks compiled a 0–10 record (0–6 against conference opponents), the first winless season in school history. They would not have another winless season until 2015. Kansas finished last in the Big Seven Conference, and were outscored by all opponents by a combined total of 377 to 93. They played their home games at Memorial Stadium in Lawrence, Kansas.

During the season, Bud Laughlin led the team in rushing yards with a total of 339 yards, while Bev Buller led in passing yards with 303 yards. The team was captained by Bud Bixler.

== Schedule ==
Date	Opponent	Site	Result	Attendance	Source
September 18	TCU*	Memorial Stadium; Lawrence, KS	L 6–27	20,000	
September 25	No. 8 UCLA*	Memorial Stadium; Lawrence, KS	L 7–32	22,000–25,000	
October 2	Colorado	Memorial Stadium; Lawrence, KS	L 0–27	24,000	
October 9	at Iowa State	Clyde Williams Field; Ames, IA	L 6–33	8,696	
October 16	No. 1 Oklahoma	Memorial Stadium; Lawrence, KS	L 0–65	28,211	
October 23	at SMU*	Cotton Bowl; Dallas, TX	L 18–36	20,037	
October 30	at Kansas State	Memorial Stadium; Manhattan, KS (rivalry)	L 6–28	21,000	
November 6	No. 20 Nebraska^{†}	Memorial Stadium; Lawrence, KS (rivalry)	L 20–41	23,000	
November 13	at Oklahoma A&M*	Lewis Field; Stillwater, OK	L 12–47	10,000	
November 20	at Missouri	Memorial Stadium; Columbia, MO (Border War)	L 18–41	29,000	
*Non-conference game; ^{†}Homecoming; Rankings from AP Poll released prior to the game
