= 1954 Nebraska Cornhuskers football team =

American college football season

1954 Nebraska Cornhuskers football

Orange Bowl, L 7–34 vs. Duke
- Conference: Big Seven Conference
- Record: 6–5 (4–2 Big 7)
- Head coach: Bill Glassford (6th season)
- Offensive scheme: Split-T
- Home stadium: Memorial Stadium

1954 Big Seven Conference football standings
	Conf.					Overall
Team	W		L		T	W		L		T
No. 3 Oklahoma $	6	–	0	–	0	10	–	0	–	0
Nebraska	4	–	2	–	0	6	–	5	–	0
Colorado	3	–	2	–	1	7	–	2	–	1
Missouri	3	–	2	–	1	4	–	5	–	1
Kansas State	3	–	3	–	0	7	–	3	–	0
Iowa State	1	–	5	–	0	3	–	6	–	0
Kansas	0	–	6	–	0	0	–	10	–	0
$ – Conference champion; Rankings from AP Poll

The 1954 Nebraska Cornhuskers football team was the representative of the University of Nebraska and member of the Big 7 Conference in the 1954 college football season. The team was coached by Bill Glassford and played their home games at Memorial Stadium in Lincoln, Nebraska.

== Before the season ==
At the conclusion of the previous season, coach Glassford's third losing season in five years, sentiment was strong for a change in leadership. However, while Glassford survived the strife, Athletic Director George Clark did resign his position. Clark had previously led the Nebraska football team, in 1945 and then again in 1948, before ascending to the position of Athletic Director. Another former Nebraska football coach, Adolph J. Lewandowski (1943–1944), was named as acting AD in his stead. Lewandowski eventually helped select Bill Orwig as the new permanent Athletic Director, a position he would hold through 1960. Glassford was kept on under Orwig, but the pressure was building for the Nebraska football program to regain its footing and build consistency going forward.

== Schedule ==
Date	Time	Opponent	Rank	Site	TV	Result	Attendance	Source
September 25	1:30 pm	at Minnesota*		Memorial Stadium; Minneapolis, MN (rivalry)		L 7–19	54,147	
October 2	2:00 pm	Iowa State		Memorial Stadium; Lincoln, NE (rivalry)		W 39–14	29,522	
October 9	2:00 pm	Kansas State		Memorial Stadium; Lincoln, NE (rivalry)		L 3–7	34,000	
October 16	2:00 pm	Oregon State*		Memorial Stadium; Lincoln, NE		W 27–7	39,000	
October 23	3:00 pm	at No. 11 Colorado		Folsom Field; Boulder, CO (rivalry)		W 20–6	32,500	
October 30	2:00 pm	Missouri		Memorial Stadium; Lincoln, NE (rivalry)		W 25–19	35,000	
November 6	2:00 pm	at Kansas	No. 20	Memorial Stadium; Lawrence, KS (rivalry)		W 41–20	23,000	
November 13	2:00 pm	Pittsburgh*^{†}		Memorial Stadium; Lincoln, NE		L 7–21	40,000	
November 20	2:00 pm	at No. 3 Oklahoma		Oklahoma Memorial Stadium; Norman, OK (rivalry)		L 7–55	55,172	
November 26	7:00 pm	at Hawaii*		Honolulu Stadium; Honolulu, HI		W 50–0	17,000	
January 1, 1955	1:00 pm	vs. No. 14 Duke*		Burdine Stadium; Miami, FL (Orange Bowl)	CBS	L 7–34	68,750	
*Non-conference game; ^{†}Homecoming; Rankings from AP Poll released prior to the game

== Roster ==
Official Roster
77 Anderson, Quinlyn T (Jr.); 61 Bayer, Joe G (So.); 54 Berguin, Robert C (So.); 85 Blair, Dorwin E (So.); 81 Braley, Jack E (Jr.); 20 Brown, Dan QB (Sr.); 64 Bryant, Charles G (Sr.); 80 Butherus, LeRoy E (So.); 40 Clark, Ron HB (Sr.); 42 Comstock, Don HB (So.); 88 Deines, Allan E (So.); 16 Edwards, John FB (Jr.); 24 Englert, Gordon QB (So.); 25 Erway, Don QB (So.); 73 Evans, Pev T (Sr.); 26 Fischer, Rex QB (Jr.); 71 Fleming, Jack T (So.); Giles, William E; 51 Glandt, William C (Jr.); 79 Glantz, Don T (Sr.); 47 Greenlaw, William HB (So.); 43 Harris, Sylvester HB (Jr.); 84 Hewitt, Don E (Jr.); 88 Hilding, Marlin E (So.); 72 Holloran, William T (Sr.); 44 Johnson, Harry HB (So.); 63 Jones, Larry G (So.)	31 Korinek, Dennis HB (Sr.); 68 Kripal, Tom G (Sr.); 75 Kunes, Kenneth T (Sr.); 66 Lair, Gale G (Jr.); 89 Loehr, Andy E (Sr.); 52 Loncar, Mark C (Sr.); 86 Lux, Dean E (Jr.); 23 Margheim, Don QB (So.); 21 McWilliams, Jon HB (Jr.); 34 Moore, Kenneth FB (Sr.); 78 Moore, Richard T (Jr.); 67 Murphy, James G (So.); 70 Neal, Richard T (Jr.); 53 Oberlin, Bob C (Sr.); 76 Petersen, Jerry T (So.); 55 Post, Doran C (Jr.); 10 Rolston, Dirkes HB (Sr.); 32 Scherer, Leo HB (Jr.); Shaver, William G (So.); 22 Smith, Charles QB (So.); 87 Smith, Howard E (So.); 41 Smith, Robert FB (Sr.); 62 Taylor, William G (Jr.); 50 Torczon, LaVerne C (So.); 65 Wagner, Bob G (Sr.); 82 Westervelt, Ted E (So.); 69 Wilkinson, John G (Jr.); 33 Yeisley, James FB (Sr.)

== Depth Chart ==
Defense by committee
HB	HB
	LB / LB
CB	DE / DT / NT / DT / DE	CB

Offensive starters

LE
Andy Loehr
LeRoy Butherus
Ted Westervelt

LG	C	RG	LT	RT
Charles Bryant	Bob Oberlin	Bob Wagner	William Holloran	Don Glantz
James Murphy	LaVerne Torczon	Tom Kripal	Jerry Petersen	Pev Evans
William Taylor	Robert Berguin		Richard Neal	Jack Fleming

RE
Jon McWilliams
Don Hewitt
William Giles

QB
Don Erway
Dan Brown
Rex Fischer

LB	RB	FB
Ron Clark	William Greenlaw	Robert Smith
Don Comstock	Dennis Korinek	Jon Edwards
Harry Johnson	Dirkes Rolston	Sylvester Harris

== Coaching staff ==
Name	Title	First year in this position	Years at Nebraska	Alma mater
Bill Glassford	Head Coach	1949	1949–1955	Pittsburgh
L. F. "Pop" Klein	Assistant Coach	1945	1945–1958	
Ray Prochaska	Ends Coach	1950	1947–1948, 1950–1954	Nebraska
Bob Davis	Backfield Coach	1949	1949–1955	
Robert Faris	Freshman Coach	1952	1952–1954	
Mike Milligan		1953	1953–1955	Pittsburgh
Don Strasheim		1954	1954–1958	Nebraska

== Game summaries ==
=== Minnesota ===
Team	1	2	Total
Nebraska			7
• Minnesota			19

- Date: September 25
- Location: Memorial Stadium • Minneapolis
- Game attendance: 54,147

Opening against powerhouse rival Minnesota was a tall order to ask of the football team. Using the Split T Formation installed during the offseason, the Cornhuskers managed a single touchdown to avoid the shutout in Minneapolis, but the Golden Gophers had little trouble adding to their lead in the series, moving up to 28–5–2 against Nebraska to date.

=== Iowa State ===
Team	1	2	Total
Iowa State			14
• Nebraska			39

- Date: October 2
- Location: Memorial Stadium • Lincoln, Nebraska
- Game attendance: 30,000

The Cornhuskers bounced back from the season opener by trouncing the Cyclones in Lincoln, scoring often and allowing some reserve players to get some on-field time for experience. Nebraska didn't back off as the game progressed, and scored again with less than two minutes remaining. The victory extended the Cornhusker winning streak over Iowa State to nine games, as Nebraska improved to 39–8–1 in the series.

=== Kansas State ===
Team	1	2	Total
• Kansas State			7
Nebraska			3

- Date: October 9
- Location: Memorial Stadium • Lincoln, Nebraska
- Game attendance: 34,000

Year in and year out in recent times, Kansas State could be counted on as an automatic win for the Nebraska squad, until last year. In 1953, the Wildcats snapped their ten-game losing streak against the Cornhuskers, and so were not intimidated by the Nebraska squad upon meeting them in Lincoln. The Wildcats put on a defensive show, allowing the Cornhuskers only a field goal as the day wore on. With Nebraska clinging to a 3–0 lead and less than five minutes to play, the Cornhusker defense allowed a Wildcat touchdown, and Kansas State took away their sixth win in the 38-game series.

=== Oregon State ===
Team	1	2	Total
Oregon State			7
• Nebraska			27

- Date: October 16
- Location: Memorial Stadium • Lincoln, Nebraska
- Game attendance: 39,000

Smarting from allowing Kansas State another win, the Cornhuskers lit into underdog Oregon State, ensuring the results would come out as expected for the week. Nebraska was up by three touchdowns before the Beavers were able to even muster a single-touchdown response, and the win put the Cornhuskers up to 6–2 in the series to date.

=== Colorado ===
Team	1	2	Total
• Nebraska			20
#11 Colorado			6

- Date: October 23
- Location: Folsom Field • Boulder, Colorado
- Game attendance: 32,500

It was not yet clear what path the 1954 Cornhuskers were going to take, having started out 2–2 on the season. The Colorado game was likely to set the tone for the rest of the year, as Nebraska had to face the Buffaloes in Boulder. Colorado entered the game with a #11 ranking from the AP Poll, led the nation in rushing offense, and held the #10 position in total defense. The first half was a fistfight that sent both teams off the field for the break tied at 6–6, but after that it was all Nebraska. The nation's leading rushing team was outrushed by the Cornhuskers 280 to 231, and gave up a total of 380 yards on the day as Nebraska snapped Colorado's nine-game winning streak. It was the first time Nebraska had recorded a victory at Folsom Field. Colorado fell to 5–8 in the overall series.

=== Missouri ===
Team	1	2	Total
Missouri			19
• Nebraska			25

- Date: October 30
- Location: Memorial Stadium • Lincoln, Nebraska
- Game attendance: 35,000

Bolstered by the victory in Boulder, but perhaps offended by the lack of attention given to them by the AP Poll after having knocked off the nation's #11 team on the road, Nebraska hosted a favored Missouri team in Lincoln. The first half was again a close affair, as the Cornhuskers held a mere 6-point lead at the half, but quickly scored two more times after the break to open the game up. Missouri did not give up, however, drawing within six points again. The Tigers had a chance to tie or go for the win when Nebraska was forced to punt inside the final minute. Nebraska prevailed when the punt returner was hit by two blockers and fumbled the ball, ending the game one play later. The win moved Nebraska to 26–18–2 over Missouri all time, snapped Missouri's three-game edge over the Cornhuskers, and returned the Victory Bell to Lincoln.

=== Kansas ===
Team	1	2	Total
• #20 Nebraska			41
Kansas			20

- Date: November 6
- Location: Memorial Stadium • Lawrence, Kansas

Following the Missouri win, the AP Poll recognized Nebraska by moving them to a shared #20 ranking entering this game, the first time the Cornhuskers had been ranked since the beginning of 1951. Kansas attempted to hold the game close, and kept with seven points well into the third quarter, but the Cornhusker machine rolled up 416 yards on the day and pulled away to secure their 4th win in league play. The victory improved the Cornhuskers to 44–13–3 over the Jayhawks all time. Despite the win, Nebraska fell back out of the AP Poll.

=== Pittsburgh ===
Team	1	2	3	4	Total
• Pittsburgh	0	0	14	7	21
Nebraska	0	0	7	0	7

- Date: November 13
- Location: Memorial Stadium, Lincoln, Nebraska
- Game attendance: 40,000

Riding a wave of success, Nebraska played host to rival Pittsburgh for the annual homecoming match up. The Panthers were favored, but a savage battle on the field yielded no points for either team by the half as the Cornhuskers battled for national respect. Despite the effort, Pittsburgh's halftime adjustments broke through the Nebraska defense for two scores in the third quarter. A single Cornhusker reply was all the home team could muster in reply as the Panthers scored a third time near the end of the game. It was Nebraska's third straight loss in the series as they slipped to 3–13–3 against Pittsburgh to date.

=== Oklahoma ===
Team	1	2	Total
Nebraska			7
• #3 Oklahoma			55

- Date: November 20
- Location: Oklahoma Memorial Stadium • Norman, Oklahoma
- Game attendance: 56,000

Perennial league champion Oklahoma brought Nebraska to Norman and quickly demolished the stunned Cornhuskers to close out the Big 7 conference schedule. It seemed like Nebraska might have still had a chance despite their 7–21 deficit at halftime, but the Sooners had little difficulty piling on the points afterward. Oklahoma's 55 points against the Cornhuskers were the most allowed in the program's history, and the scoring margin of 48 points was the worst since a 0–48 defeat, also handed down by the Sooners, in 1949. Oklahoma's record streak of wins over Nebraska was extended to 12, and Nebraska's series edge narrowed to a single-game margin of 16–15–3. Oklahoma went on to finish the season 10–0 and ranked #3 in the AP Poll. Under the relatively recent no-repeat bowl appearance rule implemented by the Big 7, Oklahoma was not permitted to represent the league in the Orange Bowl, and as the second-place Big 7 team, Nebraska instead got the nod to play in Miami on January 1.

=== Hawaii ===
Team	1	2	Total
• Nebraska			50
Hawaii			0

- Date: November 26
- Location: Honolulu Stadium • Honolulu County, Hawaii
- Game attendance: 17,000

The Cornhuskers were treated to a late season game against Hawaii, the first meeting of these teams, in Honolulu. The Cornhuskers quickly forgot their troubles against Oklahoma by piling 50 unanswered points on the hapless Rainbows for a dominating shutout victory to close the regular season. The defeat of Hawaii was Nebraska's most prolific since an identical 50–0 downing of Wyoming back in the 1934 season opener twenty years prior.

=== Duke ===
Team	1	2	3	4	Total
Nebraska	0	0	7	0	7
• #14 Duke	0	14	6	14	34

- Date: January 1
- Location: Burdine Stadium, Miami
- Game attendance: 68,750
- Game weather: Sunny, 78 °F (26 °C), Wind SE@10 mph

Nebraska was invited to the Orange Bowl for the first time in program history, and this game was the 11th in Nebraska's first-ever 11-game season as well as Nebraska's second-ever bowl game. The Cornhuskers had not played a postseason game since meeting Stanford in the 1941 Rose Bowl, while Duke had not seen a postseason game for ten years. Several opinion pieces of the time displayed disdain for the Big 7's no-repeat bowl rule, and that Oklahoma was not permitted to participate as Big 7 champion. Nebraska nonetheless attempted to make a game of it, coming back from a 0–14 halftime deficit to pull within 7, but the Blue Devils overwhelmed and dominated the day in the first and only meeting of these teams. Nebraska was outyarded 370–110, and 288–84 on the ground, to the dismay of a Nebraska team known for its ground attack. The entire Duke roster in attendance was able to get playing time, and Nebraska was unable to find success even against the Blue Devil reserves. Except for the 1941 Rose Bowl, it was the largest crowd that the Cornhuskers had ever played in front of, though as Duke began to roll and went up 27–7, many in the stands began to leave early. Said coach Glassford after the game: "I knew we'd have to play our best to stand a chance of beating Duke, but we came up with a stinking performance and got spanked."

== After the season ==
Although the season did not exactly end on a high note, the winning record and first bowl game appearance since 1941 was more than enough to allow coach Glassford to retain his position and quiet the voices hoping for him to be replaced. For the sixth season in a row since taking over at Nebraska, Glassford had alternated winning and losing seasons, so even with the runner-up league finish and post season appearance, there was still no form of confidence that the winning performance could be maintained. Glassford's second place Big 7 record of 4–2 was enough to push his overall conference record back to the winning side, at 18–17–1 (.514), though his overall record was still lagging at 26–30–3 (.466). Nebraska's program all-time league percentage improved slightly to 138–54–12 (.706), while the overall record slipped to 342–178–34 (.648).

Ranking movements Legend: ██ Increase in ranking ██ Decrease in ranking — = Not ranked
	Week											
Poll	Pre	1	2	3	4	5	6	7	8	9	10	Final
AP	—	—	—	—	—	—	—	20	—	—	—	—

== Future NFL and other professional league players ==
- Charley Bryant, 1955 24th-round pick of the Green Bay Packers
- Don Glantz, 1955 5th-round pick of the Washington Redskins
- Bob Smith, 1955 15th-round pick of the Cleveland Browns
- Laverne Torczon, 1957 18th-round pick of the Cleveland Browns
