= 1954 Davidson Wildcats football team =

American college football season

1954 Davidson Wildcats football
- Conference: Southern Conference
- Record: 6–3 (2–1 SoCon)
- Head coach: Bill Dole (3rd season)
- Home stadium: Richardson Stadium

1954 Southern Conference football standings
	Conf.					Overall
Team	W		L		T	W		L		T
No. 12 West Virginia $	3	–	0	–	0	8	–	1	–	0
Furman	2	–	0	–	0	5	–	5	–	0
No. 16 VPI	3	–	0	–	1	8	–	0	–	1
Davidson	2	–	1	–	0	6	–	3	–	0
VMI	4	–	3	–	0	4	–	6	–	0
Richmond	2	–	3	–	0	5	–	4	–	0
William & Mary	1	–	2	–	2	4	–	4	–	2
George Washington	0	–	4	–	1	1	–	7	–	1
The Citadel	0	–	4	–	0	2	–	8	–	0
$ – Conference champion; Rankings from AP Poll

The 1954 Davidson Wildcats football team was an American football team that represented Davidson College during the 1954 college football season as a member of the Southern Conference. In their third year under head coach Bill Dole, the team compiled an overall record of 6–3, with a mark of 2–1 in conference play, and finished in fourth place in the SoCon.

== Schedule ==
Date	Opponent	Site	Result	Attendance	Source
September 18	at VMI	Wilson Field; Lexington, VA	W 19–0	5,000	
September 25	Stetson*	Richardson Stadium; Davidson, NC	W 19–13		
October 2	at The Citadel	Johnson Hagood Stadium; Charleston, SC	W 13–0	6,700	
October 8	at Presbyterian*	Bailey Stadium; Clinton, SC	L 7–10	3,000	
October 22	Furman	American Legion Memorial Stadium; Charlotte, NC	L 7–19	5,000	
October 30	West Virginia Tech*^{†}	Richardson Stadium; Davidson, NC	W 51–6		
November 6	Catawba*	Richardson Stadium; Davidson, NC	W 32–12		
November 13	at Wofford*	Snyder Field; Spartanburg, SC	W 3–0	5,000	
November 20	Elon*	Richardson Stadium; Davidson, NC	L 6–14	4,500	
*Non-conference game; ^{†}Homecoming
