= 1954 South Carolina Gamecocks football team =

American college football season

1954 South Carolina Gamecocks football
- Conference: Atlantic Coast Conference
- Record: 6–4 (3–3 ACC)
- Head coach: Rex Enright (14th season)
- Captains: Bill Wohrman; Harry Lovell
- Home stadium: Carolina Stadium

1954 Atlantic Coast Conference football standings
| | Conf. | | | | | Overall |
| Team | W | | L | | T | W | | L | | T |
|---|---|---|---|---|---|---|---|---|---|---|
| No. 14 Duke $ | 4 | – | 0 | – | 0 | 8 | – | 2 | – | 1 |
| No. 8 Maryland | 4 | – | 0 | – | 1 | 7 | – | 2 | – | 1 |
| North Carolina | 4 | – | 2 | – | 0 | 4 | – | 5 | – | 1 |
| South Carolina | 3 | – | 3 | – | 0 | 6 | – | 4 | – | 0 |
| Clemson | 1 | – | 2 | – | 0 | 5 | – | 5 | – | 0 |
| Wake Forest | 1 | – | 4 | – | 1 | 2 | – | 7 | – | 1 |
| Virginia | 0 | – | 2 | – | 0 | 3 | – | 6 | – | 0 |
| NC State | 0 | – | 4 | – | 0 | 2 | – | 8 | – | 0 |
$ – Conference champion; Rankings from AP poll

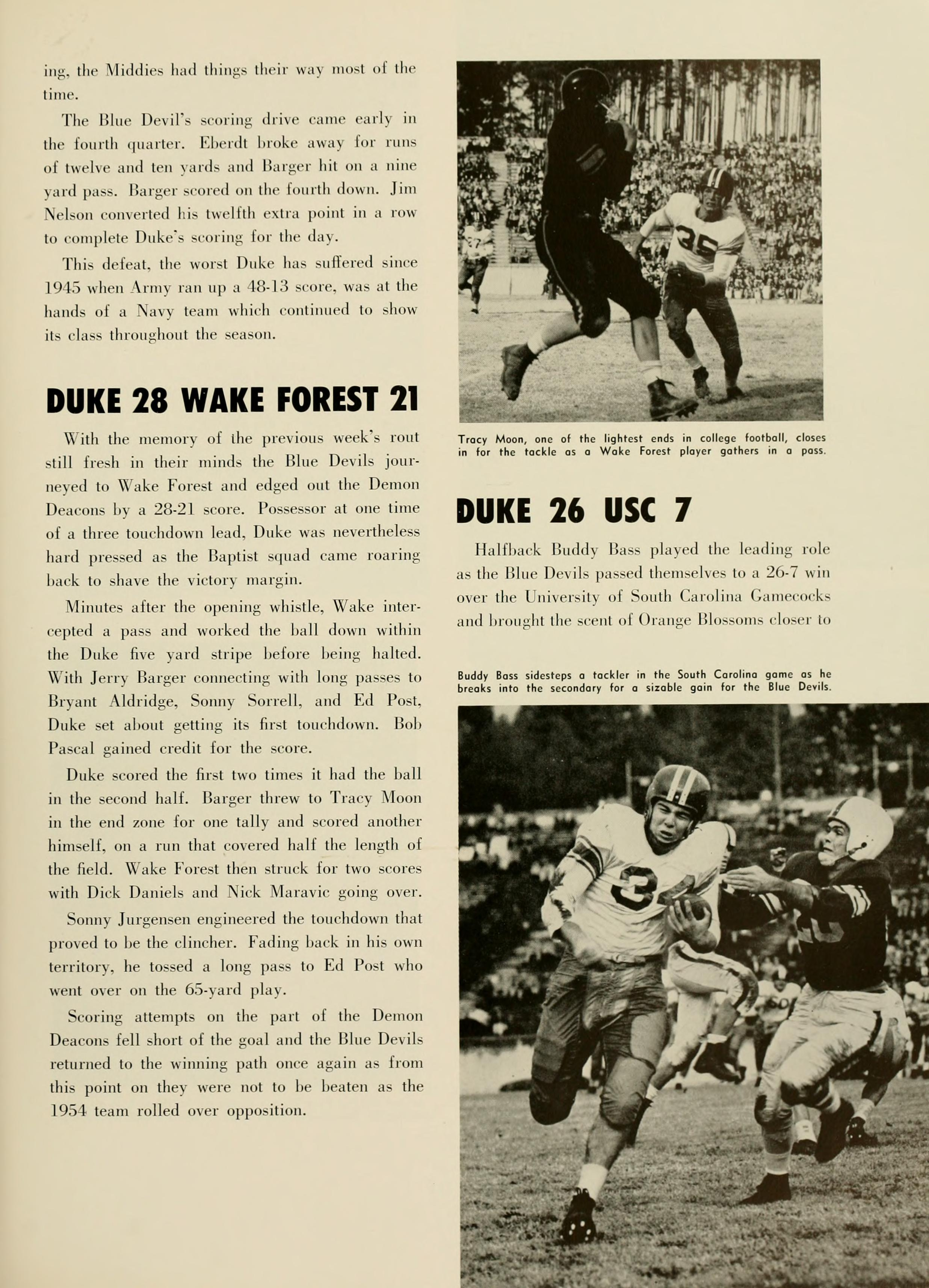

The 1954 South Carolina Gamecocks football team represented the University of South Carolina as a member of the Atlantic Coast Conference (ACC) during the 1954 college football season. Led by 14th-year head coach Rex Enright, the Gamecocks compiled an overall record of 6–4 with a mark of 3–3 in conference play, placing fourth in the ACC. The team played home games at Carolina Stadium in Columbia, South Carolina. The season opened with a defeat of Army.

== Schedule ==
| Date | Opponent | Rank | Site | Result | Attendance | Source |
|---|---|---|---|---|---|---|
| September 25 | at No. 18 Army* | | Michie Stadium; West Point, NY | W 34–20 | 12,000 | |
| October 2 | West Virginia* | No. 15 | Carolina Stadium; Columbia, SC | L 6–26 | 31,000 | |
| October 9 | at Furman* | | Sirrine Stadium; Greenville, SC | W 27–7 | 9,000 | |
| October 21 | Clemson | | Carolina Stadium; Columbia, SC (rivalry) | W 13–8 | 35,000 | |
| October 30 | Maryland | | Carolina Stadium; Columbia, SC | L 0–20 | 24,000 | |
| November 6 | at North Carolina | | Kenan Memorial Stadium; Chapel Hill, NC (rivalry) | L 19–21 | 22,000 | |
| November 13 | Virginia | | Carolina Stadium; Columbia, SC | W 27–0 | 19,000 | |
| November 20 | at Duke | | Duke Stadium; Durham, NC | L 6-7 | 13,000 | |
| November 27 | Wake Forest | | Carolina Stadium; Columbia, SC | W 20–19 | 10,000 | |
| December 4 | at The Citadel* | | Johnson Hagood Stadium; Charleston, SC | W 19–6 | 5,500 | |
*Non-conference game; Rankings from AP Poll released prior to the game
