= 1954 Clemson Tigers football team =

American college football season

1954 Clemson Tigers football
- Conference: Atlantic Coast Conference
- Record: 5–5 (1–2 ACC)
- Head coach: Frank Howard (15th season)
- Captains: Buck George; Scott Jackson; Mark Kane; Clyde White
- Home stadium: Memorial Stadium

1954 Atlantic Coast Conference football standings
	Conf.					Overall
Team	W		L		T	W		L		T
No. 14 Duke $	4	–	0	–	0	8	–	2	–	1
No. 8 Maryland	4	–	0	–	1	7	–	2	–	1
North Carolina	4	–	2	–	0	4	–	5	–	1
South Carolina	3	–	3	–	0	6	–	4	–	0
Clemson	1	–	2	–	0	5	–	5	–	0
Wake Forest	1	–	4	–	1	2	–	7	–	1
Virginia	0	–	2	–	0	3	–	6	–	0
NC State	0	–	4	–	0	2	–	8	–	0
$ – Conference champion; Rankings from AP poll

The 1954 Clemson Tigers football team was an American football team that represented Clemson College in the Atlantic Coast Conference (ACC) during the 1954 college football season. In its 15th season under head coach Frank Howard, the team compiled a 5–5 record (1–2 against conference opponents), finished fifth in the ACC, and outscored opponents by a total of 193 to 121. The team played its home games at Memorial Stadium in Clemson, South Carolina.

Buck George, Scott Jackson, Mark Kane, and Clyde White were the team captains. The team's statistical leaders included quarterback Don King with 468 passing yards, halfback Joel Wells with 352 rushing yards, and halfback Jim Coleman with 31 points (5 touchdowns, 1 extra point).

Three Clemson players were also named to the 1954 All-South Carolina football team: back Don King, end Scott Jackson, and tackle Clyde White.

== Schedule ==
Date	Time	Opponent	Site	Result	Attendance	Source
September 18	8:00 p.m.	Presbyterian*	Memorial Stadium; Clemson, SC	W 33–0	18,000	
September 25	2:00 p.m.	at Georgia*	Sanford Stadium; Athens, GA (rivalry)	L 7–14	28,000	
October 2	2:00 p.m.	VPI*	Memorial Stadium; Clemson, SC	L 7–18	14,000	
October 9	8:00 p.m.	vs. No. 14 Florida*	Gator Bowl Stadium; Jacksonville, FL	W 14–7	28,000	
October 21	2:00 p.m.	at South Carolina	Carolina Stadium; Columbia, SC (rivalry)	L 8–13	35,000	
October 30	2:00 p.m.	vs. Wake Forest	American Legion Memorial Stadium; Charlotte, NC	W 32–20	9,296	
November 6	2:00 p.m.	Furman*^{†}	Memorial Stadium; Clemson, SC	W 27–6	18,000	
November 13	2:00 p.m.	at No. 17 Maryland	Byrd Stadium; College Park, MD	L 0–16	21,000	
November 20	2:00 p.m.	at No. 18 Auburn*	Cliff Hare Stadium; Auburn, AL (rivalry)	L 6–27		
November 27	2:00 p.m.	The Citadel*	Memorial Stadium; Clemson, SC	W 59–0	1,500	
*Non-conference game; ^{†}Homecoming; Rankings from AP Poll released prior to the game; All times are in Eastern time
