= 1954 William & Mary Indians football team =

American college football season

1954 William & Mary Indians football
- Conference: Southern Conference
- Record: 4–4–2 (1–2–2 SoCon)
- Head coach: Jack Freeman (3rd season)
- Captains: Charlie Sumner; Jerry Sazio
- Home stadium: Cary Field

1954 Southern Conference football standings
	Conf.					Overall
Team	W		L		T	W		L		T
No. 12 West Virginia $	3	–	0	–	0	8	–	1	–	0
Furman	2	–	0	–	0	5	–	5	–	0
No. 16 VPI	3	–	0	–	1	8	–	0	–	1
Davidson	2	–	1	–	0	6	–	3	–	0
VMI	4	–	3	–	0	4	–	6	–	0
Richmond	2	–	3	–	0	5	–	4	–	0
William & Mary	1	–	2	–	2	4	–	4	–	2
George Washington	0	–	4	–	1	1	–	7	–	1
The Citadel	0	–	4	–	0	2	–	8	–	0
$ – Conference champion; Rankings from AP Poll

The 1954 William & Mary Indians football team represented the College of William & Mary as a member of the Southern Conference (SoCon) during the 1954 college football season. Led by third-year head coach Jack Freeman the Indians compiled an overall record of 4–4–2 with a mark of 1–2–2 in conference play, and finished seventh in the SoCon. William & Mary played home games at Cary Field in Williamsburg, Virginia.

== Schedule ==
Date	Opponent	Site	Result	Attendance	Source
September 25	at Navy*	Thompson Stadium; Annapolis, MD	L 0–27		
October 2	at Penn*	Franklin Field; Philadelphia, PA	W 27–7	17,000	
October 9	vs. NC State*	Foreman Field; Norfolk, VA	L 0–26	12,000	
October 16	at Rutgers*	Rutgers Stadium; Piscataway, NJ	W 14–7	9,500	
October 22	at George Washington	Griffith Stadium; Washington, DC	T 13–13	20,000	
October 30	at No. 14 VPI	Miles Stadium; Blacksburg, VA	T 7–7	16,000	
November 6	vs. VMI	Victory Stadium; Roanoke, VA (rivalry)	L 0–21	10,000	
November 13	No. 16 West Virginia	Cary Field; Williamsburg, VA	L 6–20	10,000	
November 20	Wake Forest*	Cary Field; Williamsburg, VA	W 13–9	2,200	
November 25	at Richmond	City Stadium; Richmond, VA (rivalry)	W 2–0	9,000	
*Non-conference game; Rankings from AP Poll released prior to the game

== NFL draft selections ==
= Pro Football Hall of Fame	= Canadian Football Hall of Fame	= College Football Hall of Fame

Year	Round	Pick	Overall	Name	Team	Position
1955	7	10	83	Bruce Sturgess	Chicago Bears	Back
1955	28	7	332	Al Crow	New York Giants	Tackle
