= 1954 NC State Wolfpack football team =

American college football season

1954 NC State Wolfpack football
- Conference: Atlantic Coast Conference
- Record: 2–8 (0–4 ACC)
- Head coach: Earle Edwards (1st season)
- Home stadium: Riddick Stadium

1954 Atlantic Coast Conference football standings
	Conf.					Overall
Team	W		L		T	W		L		T
No. 14 Duke $	4	–	0	–	0	8	–	2	–	1
No. 8 Maryland	4	–	0	–	1	7	–	2	–	1
North Carolina	4	–	2	–	0	4	–	5	–	1
South Carolina	3	–	3	–	0	6	–	4	–	0
Clemson	1	–	2	–	0	5	–	5	–	0
Wake Forest	1	–	4	–	1	2	–	7	–	1
Virginia	0	–	2	–	0	3	–	6	–	0
NC State	0	–	4	–	0	2	–	8	–	0
$ – Conference champion; Rankings from AP poll

The 1954 NC State Wolfpack football team represented North Carolina State University during the 1954 college football season. The Wolfpack were led by first-year head coach Earle Edwards and played their home games at Riddick Stadium in Raleigh, North Carolina. They competed as members of the Atlantic Coast Conference in the league's second year of existence. The Wolfpack once again failed to pick up their first ACC win, finishing winless in conference play for the second consecutive year.

== Schedule ==
Date	Opponent	Site	Result	Attendance	Source
September 18	at VPI*	Miles Stadium; Blacksburg, VA	L 21–30	9,000	
September 25	at North Carolina	Kenan Memorial Stadium; Chapel Hill, NC (rivalry)	L 6–20	22,000	
October 2	at Wake Forest	Groves Stadium; Wake Forest, NC (rivalry)	L 0–26	8,000	
October 9	vs. William & Mary*	Foreman Field; Norfolk, VA	W 26–0	12,000	
October 16	Florida State*	Riddick Stadium; Raleigh, NC	L 7–13	20,000	
October 23	No. 19 Duke	Riddick Stadium; Raleigh, NC (rivalry)	L 7–21	10,200	
October 30	Furman*	Riddick Stadium; Raleigh, NC	L 6–7	5,000	
November 6	at Maryland	Byrd Stadium; College Park, MD	L 14–42	21,000	
November 13	Richmond*	Riddick Stadium; Raleigh, NC	W 14–6	7,500	
November 20	at No. 14 West Virginia*	Mountaineer Field; Morgantown, WV	L 3–28	20,000	
*Non-conference game; Rankings from AP Poll released prior to the game
