= 1954 North Carolina Tar Heels football team =

American college football season

1954 North Carolina Tar Heels football
- Conference: Atlantic Coast Conference
- Record: 4–5–1 (4–2 ACC)
- Head coach: George T. Barclay (2nd season)
- Home stadium: Kenan Memorial Stadium

1954 Atlantic Coast Conference football standings
	Conf.					Overall
Team	W		L		T	W		L		T
No. 14 Duke $	4	–	0	–	0	8	–	2	–	1
No. 8 Maryland	4	–	0	–	1	7	–	2	–	1
North Carolina	4	–	2	–	0	4	–	5	–	1
South Carolina	3	–	3	–	0	6	–	4	–	0
Clemson	1	–	2	–	0	5	–	5	–	0
Wake Forest	1	–	4	–	1	2	–	7	–	1
Virginia	0	–	2	–	0	3	–	6	–	0
NC State	0	–	4	–	0	2	–	8	–	0
$ – Conference champion; Rankings from AP poll

The 1954 North Carolina Tar Heels football team represented the University of North Carolina at Chapel Hill during the 1954 college football season. The Tar Heels were led by second-year head coach George T. Barclay, and played their home games at Kenan Memorial Stadium. The team competed as a member of the Atlantic Coast Conference, in the conference's second season of football, finishing in third.

== Schedule ==
Date	Time	Opponent	Site	Result	Attendance	Source
September 25	2:00 p.m.	NC State	Kenan Memorial Stadium; Chapel Hill, NC (rivalry)	W 20–6	22,000	
October 2	3:15 p.m.	at Tulane*	Tulane Stadium; New Orleans, LA	T 7–7	15,000	
October 9	2:00 p.m.	Georgia*	Kenan Memorial Stadium; Chapel Hill, NC	L 7–21	20,000	
October 16	2:00 p.m.	at Maryland	Byrd Stadium; College Park, MD	L 0–33	26,000	
October 23	2:00 p.m.	Wake Forest	Kenan Memorial Stadium; Chapel Hill, NC (rivalry)	W 14–7	24,000	
October 30	2:00 p.m.	at Tennessee*	Shields–Watkins Field; Knoxville, TN	L 20–26		
November 6	2:00 p.m.	South Carolina	Kenan Memorial Stadium; Chapel Hill, NC (rivalry)	W 21–19	22,000	
November 13	2:00 p.m.	at No. 5 Notre Dame*	Notre Dame Stadium; Notre Dame, IN (rivalry)	L 13–42	55,410	
November 20	2:00 p.m.	at Virginia	Scott Stadium; Charlottesville, VA (South's Oldest Rivalry)	W 26–14	15,000	
November 27	2:00 p.m.	No. 20 Duke	Kenan Memorial Stadium; Chapel Hill, NC (Victory Bell)	L 12–47	35,000	
*Non-conference game; Rankings from AP Poll released prior to the game; All times are in Eastern time
