= 1954 Wake Forest Demon Deacons football team =

American college football season

1954 Wake Forest Demon Deacons football
- Conference: Atlantic Coast Conference
- Record: 2–7–1 (1–4–1 ACC)
- Head coach: Tom Rogers (4th season)
- Captain: Ed Stowers
- Home stadium: Groves Stadium

1954 Atlantic Coast Conference football standings
	Conf.					Overall
Team	W		L		T	W		L		T
No. 14 Duke $	4	–	0	–	0	8	–	2	–	1
No. 8 Maryland	4	–	0	–	1	7	–	2	–	1
North Carolina	4	–	2	–	0	4	–	5	–	1
South Carolina	3	–	3	–	0	6	–	4	–	0
Clemson	1	–	2	–	0	5	–	5	–	0
Wake Forest	1	–	4	–	1	2	–	7	–	1
Virginia	0	–	2	–	0	3	–	6	–	0
NC State	0	–	4	–	0	2	–	8	–	0
$ – Conference champion; Rankings from AP poll

The 1954 Wake Forest Demon Deacons football team was an American football team that represented Wake Forest University during the 1954 college football season. In their fourth season under head coach Tom Rogers, the Demon Deacons compiled a 3–6–1 record and finished in sixth place in the Atlantic Coast Conference with a 1–4–1 record against conference opponents.

End Ed Stowers and tackle Bob Bartholomew were selected by the Associated Press as first-team players on the 1954 All-Atlantic Coast Conference football team. Bartholomew was the only unanimous selection by all 43 voters.

== Schedule ==
Date	Opponent	Site	Result	Attendance	Source
September 18	George Washington*	Groves Stadium; Wake Forest, NC	W 14–0	5,000	
September 25	vs. VPI*	City Stadium; Richmond, VA (Tobacco Bowl)	L 0–32	17,000	
October 2	NC State	Groves Stadium; Wake Forest, NC (rivalry)	W 26–0	8,000	
October 9	vs. No. 13 Maryland	Bowman Gray Stadium; Winston-Salem, NC	T 13–13	11,000	
October 23	at North Carolina	Kenan Memorial Stadium; Chapel Hill, NC (rivalry)	L 7–14	24,000	
October 30	vs. Clemson	American Legion Memorial Stadium; Charlotte, NC	L 20–32	9,296	
November 6	at Richmond*	City Stadium; Richmond, VA	L 0–13	8,000	
November 13	Duke	Groves Stadium; Wake Forest, NC (rivalry)	L 21–28	10,000	
November 20	at William & Mary*	Cary Field; Williamsburg, VA	L 9–13	2,200	
November 27	at South Carolina	Carolina Stadium; Columbia, SC	L 19–20	10,000	
*Non-conference game; Rankings from AP Poll released prior to the game

== Team leaders ==
Category	Team Leader	Att/Cth	Yds
Passing	Nick Consoles	54/115	743
Rushing	Nick Maravic	98	430
Receiving	Ed Stowers	22	277
