= 1954 Furman Purple Hurricane football team =

American college football season

1954 Furman Purple Hurricane football
- Conference: Southern Conference
- Record: 5–5 (2–0 SoCon)
- Head coach: Bill Young (5th season)
- Captain: Ted Yakimowicz
- Home stadium: Sirrine Stadium

1954 Southern Conference football standings
	Conf.					Overall
Team	W		L		T	W		L		T
No. 12 West Virginia $	3	–	0	–	0	8	–	1	–	0
Furman	2	–	0	–	0	5	–	5	–	0
No. 16 VPI	3	–	0	–	1	8	–	0	–	1
Davidson	2	–	1	–	0	6	–	3	–	0
VMI	4	–	3	–	0	4	–	6	–	0
Richmond	2	–	3	–	0	5	–	4	–	0
William & Mary	1	–	2	–	2	4	–	4	–	2
George Washington	0	–	4	–	1	1	–	7	–	1
The Citadel	0	–	4	–	0	2	–	8	–	0
$ – Conference champion; Rankings from AP Poll

The 1954 Furman Purple Hurricane football team was an American football team that represented Furman University as a member of the Southern Conference (SoCon) during the 1954 college football season. Led by fifth-year head coach Bill Young, the Purple Hurricane compiled an overall record of 5–5 with a mark of 2–0 in conference play, placing second in the SoCon.

== Schedule ==
Date	Opponent	Site	Result	Attendance	Source
September 17	Newberry*	Sirrine Stadium; Greenville, SC	W 19–6	7,000	
September 24	at Miami (FL)*	Burdine Stadium; Miami, FL	L 13–51	41,827	
October 1	Presbyterian*	Sirrine Stadium; Greenville, SC	W 27–0	6,000	
October 9	South Carolina*	Sirrine Stadium; Greenville, SC	L 7–27	9,000	
October 15	The Citadel	Sirrine Stadium; Greenville, SC (rivalry)	W 31–20	8,000	
October 22	at Davidson	American Legion Memorial Stadium; Charlotte, NC	W 19–7	5,000	
October 30	at NC State*	Riddick Stadium; Raleigh, NC	W 7–6	5,000	
November 6	at Clemson*	Memorial Stadium; Clemson, SC	L 6–27	18,000	
November 13	at Florida State*	Doak Campbell Stadium; Tallahassee, FL	L 14–33	14,112	
November 20	Wofford*	Sirrine Stadium; Greenville, SC (rivalry)	L 0–19	7,000	
*Non-conference game
