= 1954 Iowa State Cyclones football team =

American college football season

1954 Iowa State Cyclones football
- Conference: Big Seven Conference
- Record: 3–6 (1–5 Big 7)
- Head coach: Vince DiFrancesca (1st season)
- Captains: Max Burkett; Weldon Thalacker
- Home stadium: Clyde Williams Field

1954 Big Seven Conference football standings
	Conf.					Overall
Team	W		L		T	W		L		T
No. 3 Oklahoma $	6	–	0	–	0	10	–	0	–	0
Nebraska	4	–	2	–	0	6	–	5	–	0
Colorado	3	–	2	–	1	7	–	2	–	1
Missouri	3	–	2	–	1	4	–	5	–	1
Kansas State	3	–	3	–	0	7	–	3	–	0
Iowa State	1	–	5	–	0	3	–	6	–	0
Kansas	0	–	6	–	0	0	–	10	–	0
$ – Conference champion; Rankings from AP Poll

The 1954 Iowa State Cyclones football team represented Iowa State College of Agricultural and Mechanic Arts (later renamed Iowa State University) in the Big Seven Conference during the 1954 college football season. In their first year under head coach Vince DiFrancesca, the Cyclones compiled a 3–6 record (1–5 against conference opponents), finished in sixth place in the conference, and were outscored by their opponents by a combined total of 182 to 151. They played their home games at Clyde Williams Field in Ames, Iowa.

The team's regular starting lineup on offense consisted of left end Mel Wostoupal, left tackle Ralph Brown, left guard Herb McDermott, center Elmer May, right guard Weldon Thalacker, right tackle Jim McMaulley, right end Barney Alleman, quarterback Jerry Finley, left halfback Gary Lutz, right halfback Bruce Alexander, and fullback Max Burkett. Max Burkett and Weldon Thalacker were the team captains.

The team's statistical leaders included Max Burkett with 528 rushing yards and 30 points (five touchdowns), John Breckenridge with 236 passing yards, and Mel Wostoupal with 151 receiving yards. No Iowa State players were selected as first-team all-conference players.

The November road game at Kansas State marked the first time that the Cyclones flew to a road contest.

== Schedule ==
Date	Time	Opponent	Site	Result	Attendance	Source
September 18	2:00 pm	South Dakota State*	Clyde Williams Field; Ames, IA	W 34–6	9,782	
September 25	12:30 pm	at Northwestern*	Dyche Stadium; Evanston, IL	L 14–27	32,056	
October 2	2:00 pm	at Nebraska	Memorial Stadium; Lincoln, NE (rivalry)	L 14–39	29,522	
October 9	2:00 pm	Kansas	Clyde Williams Field; Ames, IA	W 33–6	8,696	
October 16	2:00 pm	No. 17 Colorado^{†}	Clyde Williams Field; Ames, IA	L 0–20	14,779	
October 23	1:30 pm	at Missouri	Memorial Stadium; Columbia, MO (rivalry)	L 14–32	18,869	
October 30	2:00 pm	Drake*	Clyde Williams Field; Ames, IA	W 35–0	7,642–8,000	
November 6	2:00 pm	No. 3 Oklahoma	Clyde Williams Field; Ames, IA	L 0–40	10,209	
November 13	2:00 pm	at Kansas State	Memorial Stadium; Manhattan, KS (rivalry)	L 7–12	14,347	
*Non-conference game; ^{†}Homecoming; Rankings from AP Poll released prior to the game; All times are in Central time
