= 1954 VMI Keydets football team =

American college football season

1954 VMI Keydets football
- Conference: Southern Conference
- Record: 4–6 (4–3 SoCon)
- Head coach: John McKenna (2nd season)
- Home stadium: Wilson Field

1954 Southern Conference football standings
	Conf.					Overall
Team	W		L		T	W		L		T
No. 12 West Virginia $	3	–	0	–	0	8	–	1	–	0
Furman	2	–	0	–	0	5	–	5	–	0
No. 16 VPI	3	–	0	–	1	8	–	0	–	1
Davidson	2	–	1	–	0	6	–	3	–	0
VMI	4	–	3	–	0	4	–	6	–	0
Richmond	2	–	3	–	0	5	–	4	–	0
William & Mary	1	–	2	–	2	4	–	4	–	2
George Washington	0	–	4	–	1	1	–	7	–	1
The Citadel	0	–	4	–	0	2	–	8	–	0
$ – Conference champion; Rankings from AP Poll

The 1954 VMI Keydets football team was an American football team that represented the Virginia Military Institute (VMI) during the 1954 college football season as a member of the Southern Conference. In their second year under head coach John McKenna, the team compiled an overall record of 4–6.

== Schedule ==
Date	Opponent	Site	Result	Attendance	Source
September 18	Davidson	Wilson Field; Lexington, VA	L 0–19	5,000	
September 25	at George Washington	George Washington HS Stadium; Alexandria, VA	W 16–14	5,000	
October 2	at Richmond	City Stadium; Richmond, VA (rivalry)	W 19–6	6,000	
October 9	at Boston College*	Fenway Park; Boston, MA	L 0–44	7,941	
October 16	at Virginia*	Scott Stadium; Charlottesville, VA	L 0–21	17,000	
October 23	vs. No. 10 West Virginia	Mitchell Stadium; Bluefield, WV	L 6–40	11,000	
October 30	vs. Florida State*	City Stadium; Lynchburg, VA	L 19–33	7,000	
November 6	vs. William & Mary	Victory Stadium; Roanoke, VA (rivalry)	W 21–0	10,000	
November 13	The Citadel	Wilson Field; Lexington, VA (rivalry)	W 42–0		
November 25	vs. No. 16 VPI	Victory Stadium; Roanoke, VA (rivalry)	L 9–46	26,000	
*Non-conference game; Rankings from AP Poll released prior to the game
