= 1954 Duke Blue Devils football team =

American college football season

1954 Duke Blue Devils football
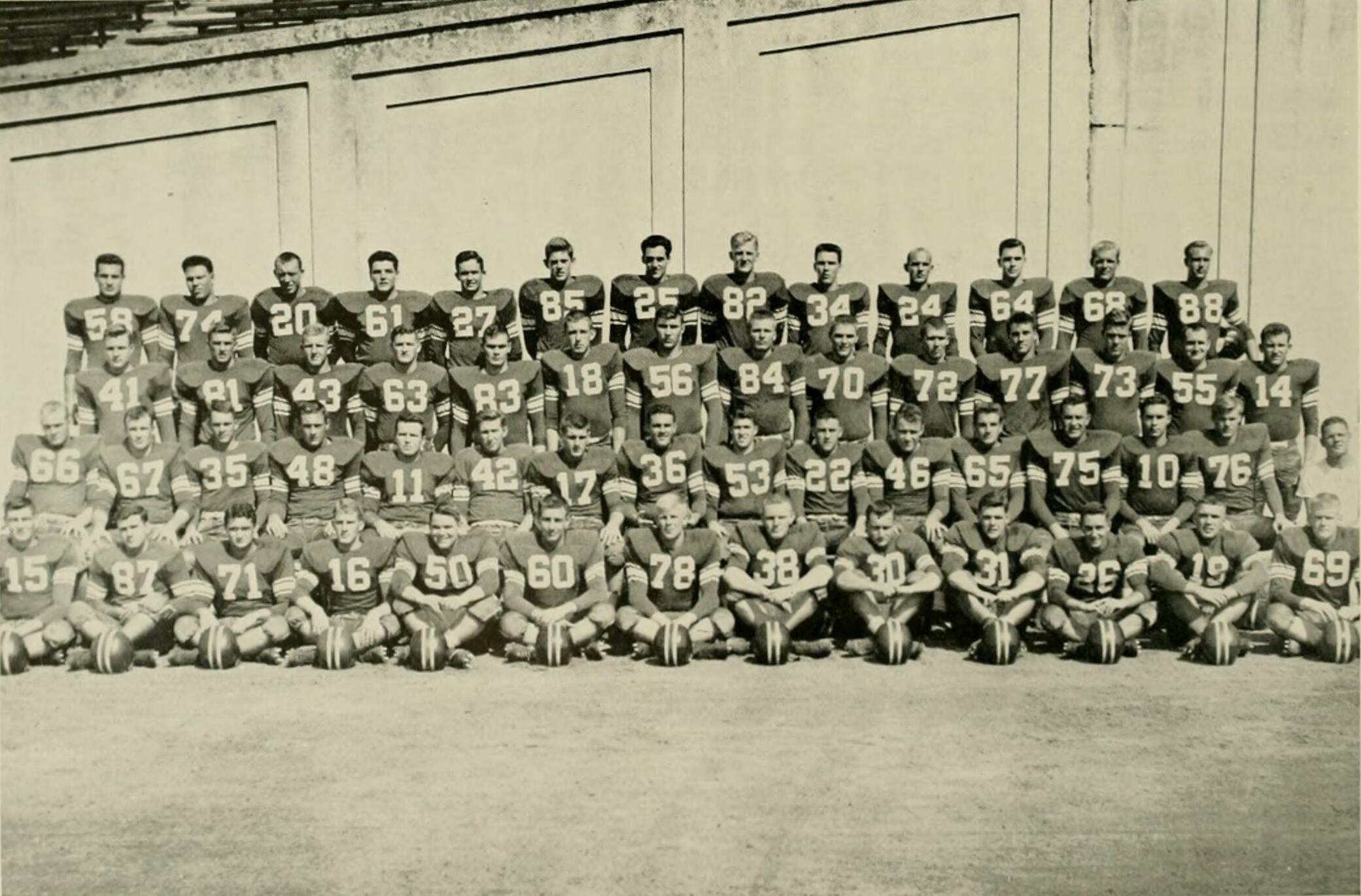

ACC champion Orange Bowl champion

Orange Bowl, W 34–7 vs. Nebraska
- Conference: Atlantic Coast Conference

Ranking
- Coaches: No. 14
- AP: No. 14
- Record: 8–2–1 (4–0 ACC)
- Head coach: William D. Murray (4th season)
- MVP: Jerry Barger
- Captain: Jerry Barger
- Home stadium: Duke Stadium

1954 Atlantic Coast Conference football standings
	Conf.					Overall
Team	W		L		T	W		L		T
No. 14 Duke $	4	–	0	–	0	8	–	2	–	1
No. 8 Maryland	4	–	0	–	1	7	–	2	–	1
North Carolina	4	–	2	–	0	4	–	5	–	1
South Carolina	3	–	3	–	0	6	–	4	–	0
Clemson	1	–	2	–	0	5	–	5	–	0
Wake Forest	1	–	4	–	1	2	–	7	–	1
Virginia	0	–	2	–	0	3	–	6	–	0
NC State	0	–	4	–	0	2	–	8	–	0
$ – Conference champion; Rankings from AP poll

The 1954 Duke Blue Devils football team represented the Duke University as a member of the Atlantic Coast Conference (ACC) during the 1954 college football season. Duke won the ACC title and finished the season ranked 14th in the final AP Poll.

== Schedule ==
Date	Opponent	Rank	Site	TV	Result	Attendance	Source
September 25	Penn*	No. 19	Franklin Field; Philadelphia, PA		W 52–0	31,000	
October 2	Tennessee*	No. 7	Duke Stadium; Durham, NC		W 7–6	30,000	
October 9	at No. 5 Purdue*	No. 6	Ross–Ade Stadium; West Lafayette, IN		T 13–13	47,000	
October 16	No. 18 Army*^{†}	No. 6	Duke Stadium; Durham, NC		L 14–28	42,500	
October 23	at NC State	No. 19	Riddick Stadium; Raleigh, NC (rivalry)		W 21–7	10,200	
October 30	Georgia Tech*	No. 16	Duke Stadium; Durham, NC		W 21–20	33,000	
November 6	vs. No. 19 Navy*	No. 11	Foreman Field; Norfolk, VA (Oyster Bowl)		L 7–40	28,000–30,000	
November 13	at Wake Forest		Groves Stadium; Wake Forest, NC (rivalry)		W 28–21	10,000	
November 20	South Carolina		Duke Stadium; Durham, NC		W 26–7	13,000	
November 27	at North Carolina	No. 20	Kenan Memorial Stadium; Chapel Hill, NC (Victory Bell)		W 47–12	35,000	
January 1	vs. Nebraska*	No. 14	Burdine Stadium; Miami, FL (Orange Bowl)	CBS	W 34–7	68,750	
*Non-conference game; ^{†}Homecoming; Rankings from AP Poll released prior to the game
