= 1954 Maryland Terrapins football team =

American college football season

1954 Maryland Terrapins football
- Conference: Atlantic Coast Conference

Ranking
- Coaches: No. 11
- AP: No. 8
- Record: 7–2–1 (4–0–1 ACC)
- Head coach: Jim Tatum (8th season)
- Offensive scheme: Split-T
- Home stadium: Byrd Stadium

1954 Atlantic Coast Conference football standings
	Conf.					Overall
Team	W		L		T	W		L		T
No. 14 Duke $	4	–	0	–	0	8	–	2	–	1
No. 8 Maryland	4	–	0	–	1	7	–	2	–	1
North Carolina	4	–	2	–	0	4	–	5	–	1
South Carolina	3	–	3	–	0	6	–	4	–	0
Clemson	1	–	2	–	0	5	–	5	–	0
Wake Forest	1	–	4	–	1	2	–	7	–	1
Virginia	0	–	2	–	0	3	–	6	–	0
NC State	0	–	4	–	0	2	–	8	–	0
$ – Conference champion; Rankings from AP poll

The 1954 Maryland Terrapins football team represented the University of Maryland in the 1954 college football season as a member of the Atlantic Coast Conference (ACC). Maryland, with its rout against Missouri, 74–13, set an ACC record-high for scoring that stood for 27 years.

== Schedule ==
Date	Opponent	Rank	Site	Result	Attendance	Source
September 18	at Kentucky*	No. 3	McLean Stadium; Lexington, KY	W 20–0	36,000	
October 1	at No. 4 UCLA*	No. 6	Los Angeles Memorial Coliseum; Los Angeles, CA	L 7–12	73,376	
October 9	vs. Wake Forest	No. 13	Bowman Gray Stadium; Wake Forest, NC	T 13–13	11,000	
October 16	North Carolina		Byrd Stadium; College Park, MD	W 33–0	26,000	
October 22	at No. 16 Miami (FL)*		Burdine Stadium; Miami, FL	L 7–9	52,506	
October 30	at South Carolina		Carolina Stadium; Columbia, SC	W 20–0	24,000	
November 6	NC State^{†}		Byrd Stadium; College Park, MD	W 42–14	21,000	
November 13	Clemson	No. 17	Byrd Stadium; College Park, MD	W 16–0	21,000	
November 20	George Washington*	No. 13	Byrd Stadium; College Park, MD	W 48–6	23,000	
November 25	Missouri*	No. 10	Byrd Stadium; College Park, MD	W 74–13	20,000	
*Non-conference game; ^{†}Homecoming; Rankings from AP Poll released prior to the game
