= List of Marshall Thundering Herd football seasons =

The Marshall Thundering Herd college football team compete as part of the National Collegiate Athletic Association (NCAA) Division I Football Bowl Subdivision, representing Marshall University in the East Division of the Sun Belt Conference (SBC). Marshall has played their home games at Joan C. Edwards Stadium in Huntington, West Virginia since 1991. The team's current head coach is Tony Gibson, who was hired in December 2024.

The Thundering Herd fielded their first team in 1895. They have played 125 seasons of football, compiling a record of 638–574–47 and winning 14 conference championships (13 outright). The Thundering Herd appeared in 19 bowl games, (Note: The Tangerine Bowl was unsanctioned by the NCAA until 1968. As such, the 1948 appearance in the game is not included in the official NCAA bowl listing for Marshall.) compiling a 13–6 record, and they appeared in the NCAA Division I-AA playoffs eight times, winning two national championships (1992 and 1996).

== Seasons ==
National champions †	Conference champions *	Division champions ‡	Postseason berth ^

Season (Note: Marshall did not field teams for the 1896, 1918, or 1943–1945.)	Head coach	Conference	Conference finish	Division finish	Wins	Losses	Ties	Postseason result	AP Poll (Note: The Associated Press began conducting a weekly college football poll in 1936.)	Coaches' Poll (Note: The college football coaches' poll has been sponsored by multiple organizations since its creation in 1950. Its current sponsor is USA Today)
1895	No Coach	Independent	—	—	0	1	1	—	N/A	N/A
1897	No Coach	Independent	—	—	0	3	0	—	N/A	N/A
1898	No Coach	Independent	—	—	4	1	0	—	N/A	N/A
1899	No Coach	Independent	—	—	0	0	1	—	N/A	N/A
1900	No Coach	Independent	—	—	1	0	2	—	N/A	N/A
1901	No Coach	Independent	—	—	2	0	1	—	N/A	N/A
1902	No Coach	Independent	—	—	5	0	2	—	N/A	N/A
1903	George Ford	Independent	—	—	3	1	1	—	N/A	N/A
1904	George Ford	Independent	—	—	1	3	3	—	N/A	N/A
1905	Alfred McCray	Independent	—	—	6	2	0	—	N/A	N/A
1906	Pearl Rardin	Independent	—	—	4	0	1	—	N/A	N/A
1907	No Coach	Independent	—	—	3	2	1	—	N/A	N/A
1908	William G. Vinal	Independent	—	—	0	6	0	—	N/A	N/A
1909	Boyd Chambers	Independent	—	—	2	2	1	—	N/A	N/A
1910	Boyd Chambers	Independent	—	—	5	1	1	—	N/A	N/A
1911	Boyd Chambers	Independent	—	—	4	1	1	—	N/A	N/A
1912	Boyd Chambers	Independent	—	—	3	4	0	—	N/A	N/A
1913	Boyd Chambers	Independent	—	—	3	4	0	—	N/A	N/A
1914	Boyd Chambers	Independent	—	—	5	4	0	—	N/A	N/A
1915	Boyd Chambers	Independent	—	—	1	7	0	—	N/A	N/A
1916	Boyd Chambers	Independent	—	—	7	2	1	—	N/A	N/A
1917	Burton Shipley	Independent	—	—	1	7	1	—	N/A	N/A
1919	Arch Reilly	Independent	—	—	8	0	0	—	N/A	N/A
1920	Herbert Cramer	Independent	—	—	0	8	0	—	N/A	N/A
1921	Skeeter Shelton	Independent	—	—	6	2	1	—	N/A	N/A
1922	Skeeter Shelton	Independent	—	—	5	4	0	—	N/A	N/A
1923	Harrison Briggs	Independent	—	—	1	7	0	—	N/A	N/A
1924	Russ Meredith	Independent	—	—	4	3	1	—	N/A	N/A
1925*	Charles Tallman	WVIAC	1st*	—	4	1	4	—	N/A	N/A
1926	Charles Tallman	WVIAC	T–2nd	—	5	4	1	—	N/A	N/A
1927	Charles Tallman	WVIAC	2nd	—	5	3	1	—	N/A	N/A
1928*	Charles Tallman	WVIAC	1st*	—	8	1	1	—	N/A	N/A
1929	John Maulbetsch	WVIAC	T–4th	—	5	3	1	—	N/A	N/A
1930	John Maulbetsch	WVIAC	3rd	—	3	5	1	—	N/A	N/A
1931*	Tom Dandelet	WVIAC	1st*	—	6	3	0	—	N/A	N/A
1932	Tom Dandelet	WVIAC	—	—	6	2	1	—	N/A	N/A
1933	Tom Dandelet	Buckeye	5th	—	3	5	1	—	N/A	N/A
1934	Tom Dandelet	Buckeye	5th	—	3	6	0	—	N/A	N/A
1935	Cam Henderson	Buckeye	6th	—	4	6	0	—	N/A	N/A
1936	Cam Henderson	Buckeye	3rd	—	6	3	1	—	—	N/A
1937*	Cam Henderson	Buckeye	1st*	—	9	0	1	—	—	N/A
1938	Cam Henderson	Buckeye	3rd	—	5	4	0	—	—	N/A
1939	Cam Henderson	WVIAC	—	—	9	2	0	—	—	N/A
1940	Cam Henderson	WVIAC	—	—	8	2	0	—	—	N/A
1941	Cam Henderson	WVIAC	—	—	7	1	0	—	—	N/A
1942	Cam Henderson	WVIAC	—	—	1	7	1	—	—	N/A
1946	Cam Henderson	WVIAC	—	—	2	7	1	—	—	N/A
1947	Cam Henderson	WVIAC	—	—	9	3	0	Lost Tangerine Bowl to Catawba Indians, 0–7 ^	—	N/A
1948	Cam Henderson	OVC	—	—	2	7	1	—	—	N/A
1949	Cam Henderson	OVC	—	—	6	4	0	—	—	N/A
1950	Pete Pederson	OVC	5th	—	2	8	0	—	—	—
1951	Pete Pederson	OVC	T–2nd	—	5	4	1	—	—	—
1952	Pete Pederson	Independent	—	—	2	7	2	—	—	—
1953	Herb Royer	Independent	—	—	2	5	2	—	—	—
1954	Herb Royer	MAC	7th	—	4	5	0	—	—	—
1955	Herb Royer	MAC	6th	—	3	6	0	—	—	—
1956	Herb Royer	MAC	T–4th	—	3	6	0	—	—	—
1957	Herb Royer	MAC	3rd	—	6	3	0	—	—	—
1958	Herb Royer	MAC	7th	—	3	6	0	—	—	—
1959	Charlie Snyder	MAC	6th	—	1	8	0	—	—	—
1960	Charlie Snyder	MAC	6th	—	2	7	1	—	—	—
1961	Charlie Snyder	MAC	6th	—	2	7	1	—	—	—
1962	Charlie Snyder	MAC	7th	—	4	6	0	—	—	—
1963	Charlie Snyder	MAC	4th	—	5	4	1	—	—	—
1964	Charlie Snyder	MAC	T–2nd	—	7	3	0	—	—	—
1965	Charlie Snyder	MAC	T–5th	—	5	5	0	—	—	—
1966	Charlie Snyder	MAC	T–6th	—	2	8	0	—	—	—
1967	Charlie Snyder	MAC	7th	—	0	10	0	—	—	—
1968	Perry Moss	MAC	7th	—	0	9	1	—	—	—
1969	Rick Tolley	Independent	—	—	3	7	0	—	—	—
1970	Rick Tolley	Independent	—	—	3	6	0	—	—	—
1971	Jack Lengyel	Independent	—	—	2	8	0	—	—	—
1972	Jack Lengyel	Independent	—	—	2	8	0	—	—	—
1973	Jack Lengyel	Independent	—	—	4	7	0	—	—	—
1974	Jack Lengyel	Independent	—	—	1	10	0	—	—	—
1975	Frank Ellwood	Independent	—	—	2	9	0	—	—	—
1976	Frank Ellwood	Independent	—	—	5	6	0	—	—	—
1977	Frank Ellwood	SoCon	7th	—	2	9	0	—	—	—
1978	Frank Ellwood	SoCon	7th	—	1	10	0	—	—	—
1979	Sonny Randle	SoCon	8th	—	1	10	0	—	—	—
1980	Sonny Randle	SoCon	8th	—	2	8	1	—	—	—
1981	Sonny Randle	SoCon	8th	—	2	9	0	—	—	—
1982	Sonny Randle	SoCon	8th	—	3	8	0	—	—	—
1983	Sonny Randle	SoCon	5th	—	4	7	0	—	—	—
1984	Stan Parrish	SoCon	T–5th	—	6	5	0	—	—	—
1985	Stan Parrish	SoCon	4th	—	7	3	1	—	—	—
1986	George Chaump	SoCon	5th	—	6	4	1	—	—	—
1987	George Chaump	SoCon	2nd	—	10	5	0	Lost Division I-AA National Championship Game to Northeast Louisiana Indians, 42–43 ^	—	—
1988*	George Chaump	SoCon	T–1st*	—	11	2	0	Lost Division I-AA Quarterfinal to Furman Paladins, 9–13 ^	—	—
1989	George Chaump	SoCon	T–3rd	—	6	5	0	—	—	—
1990	Jim Donnan	SoCon	T–4th	—	6	5	0	—	—	—
1991	Jim Donnan	SoCon	T–2nd	—	11	4	0	Lost Division I-AA National Championship Game to Youngstown State Penguins, 17–25 ^	—	—
1992†	Jim Donnan	SoCon	T–2nd	—	12	3	0	Won Division I-AA National Championship Game against Youngstown State Penguins, 31–28 ^	—	—
1993	Jim Donnan	SoCon	2nd	—	11	4	0	Lost Division I-AA National Championship Game to Youngstown State Penguins, 5–17 ^	—	—
1994*	Jim Donnan	SoCon	1st*	—	12	2	0	Lost Division I-AA Semifinal to Boise State Broncos, 24–28 ^	—	—
1995	Jim Donnan	SoCon	2nd	—	12	3	0	Lost Division I-AA National Championship Game to Montana Grizzlies, 20–22 ^	—	—
1996†*	Bob Pruett	SoCon	1st*	—	15	0	— (Note: Overtime rules in college football were introduced in 1996, making ties impossible in the period since.)	Won Division I-AA National Championship Game against Montana Grizzlies, 49–29 ^	—	—
1997*	Bob Pruett	MAC	1st*	1st (East)‡	10	3	—	Lost Motor City Bowl to Ole Miss Rebels, 31–34 ^	—	—
1998*	Bob Pruett	MAC	1st*	T–1st (East)‡	12	1	—	Won Motor City Bowl against Louisville Cardinals, 48–29 ^	—	—
1999*	Bob Pruett	MAC	1st*	1st (East)‡	13	0	—	Won Motor City Bowl against BYU Cougars, 21–3 ^	10	10
2000*	Bob Pruett	MAC	1st*	T–1st (East)‡	8	5	—	Won Motor City Bowl against Cincinnati Bearcats, 25–14 ^	—	—
2001	Bob Pruett	MAC	2nd	1st (East)‡	11	2	—	Won GMAC Bowl against East Carolina Pirates, 64–61 ^	—	21
2002*	Bob Pruett	MAC	1st*	1st (East)‡	11	2	—	Won GMAC Bowl against Louisville Cardinals, 38–15 ^	24	19
2003	Bob Pruett	MAC	—	2nd (East)	8	4	—	—	—	—
2004	Bob Pruett	MAC	—	T–2nd (East)	6	6	—	Lost Fort Worth to Cincinnati Bearcats, 14–32 ^	—	—
2005	Mark Snyder	C-USA	—	T–5th (East)	4	7	—	—	—	—
2006	Mark Snyder	C-USA	—	3rd (East)	5	7	—	—	—	—
2007	Mark Snyder	C-USA	—	5th (East)	3	9	—	—	—	—
2008	Mark Snyder	C-USA	—	T–5th (East)	4	8	—	—	—	—
2009	Mark Snyder	C-USA	—	T–4th (East)	7	6	—	Won Little Caesars Pizza Bowl against Ohio Bobcats, 21–17 ^ (Note: Rick Minter served as interim head coach for the Little Caesars Pizza Bowl)	—	—
2010	Doc Holliday	C-USA	—	4th (East)	5	7	—	—	—	—
2011	Doc Holliday	C-USA	—	2nd (East)	7	6	—	Won Beef 'O' Brady's Bowl against FIU Panthers 20–10 ^	—	—
2012	Doc Holliday	C-USA	—	T–3rd (East)	5	7	—	—	—	—
2013	Doc Holliday	C-USA	2nd	1st (East)‡	10	4	—	Won Military Bowl against Maryland Terrapins, 31–20 ^	—	—
2014*	Doc Holliday	C-USA	1st*	1st (East)‡	13	1	—	Won Boca Raton Bowl against Northern Illinois Huskies, 52–23 ^	23	22
2015	Doc Holliday	C-USA	—	T–2nd (East)	10	3	—	Won St. Petersburg Bowl against UConn Huskies, 16–10 ^	—	—
2016	Doc Holliday	C-USA	—	T–6th (East)	3	9	—	—	—	—
2017	Doc Holliday	C-USA	—	T–3rd (East)	8	5	—	Won New Mexico Bowl against Colorado State Rams, 31–28 ^	—	—
2018	Doc Holliday	C-USA	—	T–2nd (East)	9	4	—	Won Gasparilla Bowl against South Florida Bulls, 38–20 ^	—	—
2019	Doc Holliday	C-USA	—	T–2nd (East)	8	5	—	Lost Gasparilla Bowl to UCF Knights, 25–48 ^	—	—
2020	Doc Holliday	C-USA	2nd	1st (East)‡	7	3	—	Lost Camellia Bowl to Buffalo Bulls, 10–17 ^	—	—
2021	Charles Huff	C-USA	—	T–2nd (East)	7	6	—	Lost New Orleans Bowl to Louisiana Ragin' Cajuns, 21–36 ^	—	—
2022	Charles Huff	Sun Belt	—	3rd (East)	9	4	—	Won Myrtle Beach Bowl against UConn Huskies, 28–14 ^	—	—
2023	Charles Huff	Sun Belt	—	T–5th (East)	6	7	—	Lost Frisco Bowl to UTSA Roadrunners, 17–35 ^	—	—
2024*	Charles Huff	Sun Belt	1st*	1st (East)‡	10	3	—	— (Note: Marshall was originally selected to participate in the Independence Bowl against Army, but withdrew due to a high number of players entering the transfer portal.)	—	—
2025	Tony Gibson	Sun Belt	—	5th (East)	5	7	—	—	—	—
