= List of West Virginia Mountaineers football seasons =

The West Virginia Mountaineers college football team competes as part of the National Collegiate Athletic Association (NCAA) Division I Football Bowl Subdivision, representing West Virginia University in the Big 12 Conference. West Virginia has played their home games on Mountaineer Field at Milan Puskar Stadium in Morgantown, West Virginia since 1980.

From 1891 to 1949, West Virginia competed as a football independent. The Mountaineers saw modest success during this period and made appearances in bowl games in both 1922 and 1948. From 1950 to 1967, West Virginia was a member of the Southern Conference and won the conference championship nine times. The membership of the SoCon fluctuated wildly at times during West Virginia's tenure, and by 1968 they chose to leave the conference and become a football independent once more. Between 1968 and 1990, the Mountaineers again competed as an independent and played in ten separate bowl games under three head coaches: Jim Carlen, Bobby Bowden and Don Nehlen. From 1991–2011, West Virginia competed in the Big East Conference, winning seven conference championships, and appearing in four Bowl Coalition and Bowl Championship Series games. Since 2012, West Virginia has competed as a member of Big 12 Conference. Through the 2024 season, West Virginia has compiled an official overall record of 787 wins, 533 losses, 45 ties and has appeared in 40 bowl games, with its most recent appearance coming in the 2024 Frisco Bowl.

This is a list of their annual results.

== Seasons ==
Year	Coach	Overall	Conference	Standing	Bowl/playoffs	Coaches^{#}	AP^{°}
Frederick L. Emory (Independent) (1891)
1891	Frederick L. Emory	0–1					
1892	No team						
F. William Rane (Independent) (1893–1894)
1893	F. William Rane	2–1					
1894	F. William Rane	2–2					
Harry McCrory (Independent) (1895)
1895	Harry McCrory	5–1					
Thomas Trenchard (Independent) (1896)
1896	Thomas Trenchard	3–7–2					
George Krebs (Independent) (1897)
1897	George Krebs	5–4–1					
Harry Anderson (Independent) (1898)
1898	Harry Anderson	6–1					
Louis Yeager (Independent) (1899)
1899	Louis Yeager	2–3					
John Hill (Independent) (1900)
1900	John Hill	4–3					
Louis Yeager (Independent) (1901–1902)
1901	Louis Yeager	3–2					
1902	Louis Yeager	7–4					
Harry E. Trout (Independent) (1903)
1903	Harry E. Trout	7–1					
Anthony Chez (Independent) (1904)
1904	Anthony Chez	6–3					
Carl Forkum (Independent) (1905–1906)
1905	Carl Forkum	8–1					
1906	Carl Forkum	5–5					
Clarence W. Russell (Independent) (1907)
1907	Clarence W. Russell	6–4					
Charles A. Lueder (Independent) (1908–1911)
1908	Charles A. Lueder	5–3					
1909	Charles A. Lueder	4–3–2					
1910	Charles A. Lueder	2–4–1					
1911	Charles A. Lueder	6–3					
William P. Edmunds (Independent) (1912)
1912	William P. Edmunds	6–3					
Edwin Sweetland (Independent) (1913)
1913	Edwin Sweetland	3–4–2					
Sol Metzger (Independent) (1914–1915)
1914	Sol Metzger	5–4					
1915	Sol Metzger	5–2–1					
Mont McIntire (Independent) (1916–1920)
1916	Mont McIntire	5–2–2					
1917	Mont McIntire	6–3–1					
1918	No team						
1919	Mont McIntire	8–2					
1920	Mont McIntire	5–4–1					
Clarence Spears (Independent) (1921–1924)
1921	Clarence Spears	5–4–1					
1922	Clarence Spears	10–0–1			W East-West		
1923	Clarence Spears	7–1–1					
1924	Clarence Spears	8–1					
Ira Rodgers (Independent) (1925–1930)
1925	Ira Rodgers	8–1					
1926	Ira Rodgers	6–4					
1927	Ira Rodgers	2–4–3					
1928	Ira Rodgers	8–2					
1929	Ira Rodgers	4–3–3					
1930	Ira Rodgers	5–5					
Greasy Neale (Independent) (1931–1933)
1931	Greasy Neale	4–6					
1932	Greasy Neale	5–5					
1933	Greasy Neale	3–5–3					
Charles Tallman (Independent) (1934–1936)
1934	Charles Tallman	6–4					
1935	Charles Tallman	3–4–2					
1936	Charles Tallman	6–4					
Marshall Glenn (Independent) (1937–1939)
1937	Marshall Glenn	8–1–1			W Sun		
1938	Marshall Glenn	4–5–1					
1939	Marshall Glenn	2–6–1					
Bill Kern (Independent) (1940–1942)
1940	Bill Kern	4–4–1					
1941	Bill Kern	4–6					
1942	Bill Kern	5–4					
Ira Rodgers (Independent) (1943–1945)
1943	Ira Rodgers	4–3					
1944	Ira Rodgers	5–3–1					
1945	Ira Rodgers	2–6–1					
Bill Kern (Independent) (1946–1947)
1946	Bill Kern	5–5					
1947	Bill Kern	6–4					
Dudley DeGroot (Independent) (1948–1949)
1948	Dudley DeGroot	9–3			W Sun		
1949	Dudley DeGroot	4–6–1					
Art Lewis (Southern Conference) (1950–1959)
1950	Art Lewis	2–8	1–3	14th			
1951	Art Lewis	5–5	2–3	10th			
1952	Art Lewis	7–2	5–1	2nd			
1953	Art Lewis	8–2	4–0	1st	L Sugar	13	10
1954	Art Lewis	8–1	3–0	1st			12
1955	Art Lewis	8–2	4–0	1st		17	19
1956	Art Lewis	6–4	5–0	1st			
1957	Art Lewis	7–2–1	3–0	2nd			
1958	Art Lewis	4–5–1	4–0	1st			
1959	Art Lewis	3–7	2–2	6th			
Gene Corum (Southern Conference) (1960–1965)
1960	Gene Corum	0–8–2	0–2–1	9th			
1961	Gene Corum	4–6	2–1	4th			
1962	Gene Corum	8–2	4–0	2nd			
1963	Gene Corum	4–6	3–1	2nd			
1964	Gene Corum	7–4	5–0	1st	L Liberty		
1965	Gene Corum	6–4	4–0	1st			
Jim Carlen (Southern Conference) (1966–1967)
1966	Jim Carlen	3–5–2	3–0	2nd			
1967	Jim Carlen	5–4–1	4–0–1	1st			
Jim Carlen (Independent) (1968–1969)
1968	Jim Carlen	7–3					
1969	Jim Carlen	10–1			W Peach		17
Bobby Bowden (Independent) (1970–1975)
1970	Bobby Bowden	8–3					
1971	Bobby Bowden	7–4					
1972	Bobby Bowden	8–4			L Peach		
1973	Bobby Bowden	6–5					
1974	Bobby Bowden	4–7					
1975	Bobby Bowden	9–3			W Peach	17	20
Frank Cignetti (Independent) (1976–1979)
1976	Frank Cignetti	5–6					
1977	Frank Cignetti	5–6					
1978	Frank Cignetti	2–9					
1979	Frank Cignetti	5–6					
Don Nehlen (Independent) (1980–1990)
1980	Don Nehlen	6–6					
1981	Don Nehlen	9–3			W Peach	18	17
1982	Don Nehlen	9–3			L Gator	19	19
1983	Don Nehlen	9–3			W Hall of Fame Classic	16	16
1984	Don Nehlen	8–4			W Bluebonnet	18	
1985	Don Nehlen	7–3–1					
1986	Don Nehlen	4–7					
1987	Don Nehlen	6–6			L Sun		
1988	Don Nehlen	11–1			L Fiesta	5	5
1989	Don Nehlen	8–3–1			L Gator		21
1990	Don Nehlen	4–7					
Don Nehlen (Big East Conference) (1991–2000)
1991	Don Nehlen	6–5	3–4	(Note: The Big East did not crown an official champion until 1993 when full league play began.)			
1992	Don Nehlen	5–4–2	2–3–1				
1993	Don Nehlen	11–1	7–0	1st	L Sugar	6	7
1994	Don Nehlen	7–6	4–3	T–3rd	L Carquest		
1995	Don Nehlen	5–6	4–3	T–4th			
1996	Don Nehlen	8–4	4–3	4th	L Gator		
1997	Don Nehlen	7–5	4–3	T–3rd	L Carquest		
1998	Don Nehlen	8–4	5–2	T–2nd	L Insight.com		
1999	Don Nehlen	4–7	3–4	T–4th			
2000	Don Nehlen	7–5	3–4	T–5th	W Music City		
Rich Rodriguez (Big East Conference) (2001–2007)
2001	Rich Rodriguez	3–8	1–6	7th			
2002	Rich Rodriguez	9–4	6–1	2nd	L Continental Tire	20	25
2003	Rich Rodriguez	8–5	6–1	T–1st	L Gator		
2004	Rich Rodriguez	8–4	4–2	T–1st	L Gator		
2005	Rich Rodriguez	11–1	7–0	1st	W Sugar^{†}	6	5
2006	Rich Rodriguez	11–2	5–2	T–2nd	W Gator	10	10
2007	Rich Rodriguez (Note: The team was coached by Rich Rodriguez until he announced on December 16, 2007, that he was leaving West Virginia to coach the Michigan Wolverines. The head coaching position remained vacant after his announcement, with assistant head coach Bill Stewart serving as interim head coach. Stewart was then named head coach on January 3, 2008, after leading the Mountaineers to victory in the 2008 Fiesta Bowl over the #3 Oklahoma Sooners.)	11–2	5–2	T–1st	W Fiesta^{†}	6	6
Bill Stewart (Big East Conference) (2007–2010)
2008	Bill Stewart	9–4	5–2	T–2nd	W Meineke Car Care		23
2009	Bill Stewart	9–4	5–2	T–2nd	L Gator	22	25
2010	Bill Stewart	9–4	5–2	T–1st	L Champs Sports		
Dana Holgorsen (Big East Conference) (2011)
2011	Dana Holgorsen	10–3	5–2	T–1st	W Orange^{†}	18	17
Dana Holgorsen (Big 12 Conference) (2012–2018)
2012	Dana Holgorsen	7–6	4–5	T–5th	L Pinstripe		
2013	Dana Holgorsen	4–8	2–7	T–7th			
2014	Dana Holgorsen	7–6	5–4	T–4th	L Liberty		
2015	Dana Holgorsen	8–5	4–5	5th	W Cactus		
2016	Dana Holgorsen	10–3	7–2	T–2nd	L Russell	17	18
2017	Dana Holgorsen	7–6	5–4	T–4th	L Heart of Dallas		
2018	Dana Holgorsen	8–4	6–3	T–3rd	L Camping World	22	20
Neal Brown (Big 12 Conference) (2019–2024)
2019	Neal Brown	5–7	3–6	T–7th			
2020	Neal Brown	6–4	4–4	6th	W Liberty		
2021	Neal Brown	6–7	4–5	6th	L Guaranteed Rate		
2022	Neal Brown	5–7	3–6	9th			
2023	Neal Brown	9–4	6–3	T–4th	W Duke's Mayo	25	
2024	Neal Brown	6–7	5–4	T–8th	L Frisco		
Rich Rodriguez (Big 12 Conference) (2025–present)
2025	Rich Rodriguez	4–8	2-7				
Total:		787–533–45					
National championship Conference title Conference division title or championship game berth
^{†}Indicates Bowl Coalition, Bowl Alliance, BCS, or CFP / New Years' Six bowl.; ^{#}Rankings from final Coaches Poll.
