= 1967 Fairmont State Falcons football team =

American college football season

1967 Fairmont State Falcons football
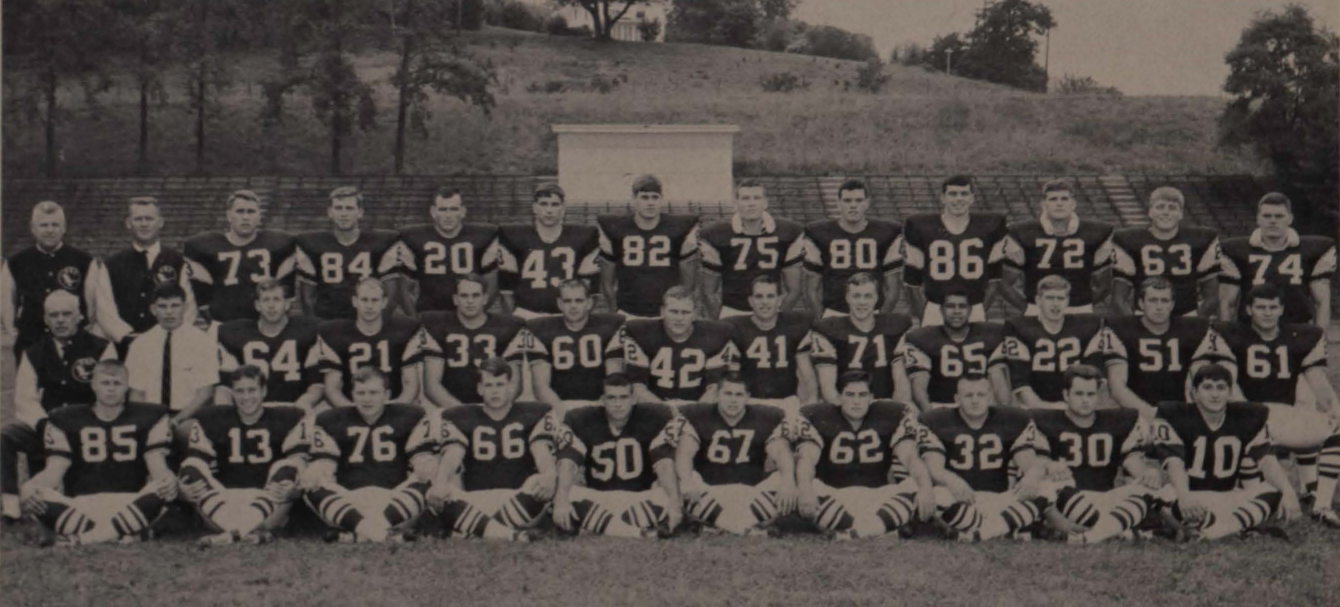

NAIA national champion WVIAC champion

Champion Bowl, W 28–21 vs. Eastern Washington
- Conference: WVIAC
- Record: 11–0 (7–0 WVIAC)
- Head coach: Harold "Deacon" Duvall (16th season)
- Home stadium: East-West Stadium

1967 West Virginia Intercollegiate Athletic Conference football standings
	Conf.					Overall
Team	W		L		T	W		L		T
No. 1 Fairmont State $^	7	–	0	–	0	11	–	0	–	0
No. 14 Concord	5	–	1	–	0	7	–	2	–	0
Glenville State	5	–	1	–	1	5	–	2	–	1
Salem	4	–	3	–	1	5	–	3	–	1
West Liberty State	4	–	4	–	0	4	–	5	–	0
West Virginia Wesleyan	2	–	3	–	0	3	–	5	–	0
Bluefield State	1	–	6	–	1	2	–	6	–	1
West Virginia State	1	–	5	–	0	2	–	6	–	0
West Virginia Tech	0	–	6	–	1	1	–	7	–	1
Shepherd *	1	–	1	–	0	3	–	5	–	0
$ – Conference champion; ^ – NAIA playoff participant * – Did not qualify for conference standings Conference standings based on power ratings; Rankings from NAIA poll

The 1967 Fairmont State Falcons football team was an American football team that represented Fairmont State University as a member of the West Virginia Intercollegiate Athletic Conference (WVIAC) during the 1967 NAIA football season. In their 16th season under head coach Harold "Deacon" Duvall, the Falcons compiled a perfect 11–0 record (7–0 against conference opponents) and won the WVIAC championship. The team advanced to the NAIA playoffs where they defeated Northern Michigan in the semifinals and then beat Eastern Washington in the Champion Bowl to win the 1967 NAIA national championship. The team led the NAIA in defense, allowing only 119.8 yards per game (60.5 passing and 59.3 rushing).

The Falcons' 1967 NAIA national championship was the State of West Virginia's first national title in football. The 1967 Fairmont team was inducted into the Fairmont State Athletics Hall of Fame in 2017.

The team played its home games at East-West Stadium in Fairmont, West Virginia.

== Schedule ==
Date	Opponent	Site	Result	Attendance	Source
September 16	West Virginia Tech		W 42–7		
September 23	Bluefield State	East-West Stadium; Fairmont, WV	W 52–13		
September 30	Salem		W 21–13		
October 7	at West Virginia Wesleyan	Cebe Ross Field; Buckhannon, WV	W 48–0		
October 21	Glenville State	East-West Stadium; Fairmont, WV	W 21–0		
October 28	at West Liberty State	West Liberty, WV	W 20–0		
November 4	No. 1 Waynesburg*	East-West Stadium; Fairmont, WV	W 7–0	10,000	
November 11	at Central State (OH)*	Wilberforce, OH	W 8–0		
November 18	at Concord (WV)	Athens, WV	W 23–20		
November 25	Northern Michigan*	East-West Stadium; Fairmont, WV (NAIA eastern semifinal)	W 21–7	7,000	
December 9	vs. Eastern Washington*	Mountaineer Field; Morgantown, WV (Champion Bowl)	W 28–21	12,250	
*Non-conference game; Rankings from NAIA Poll released prior to the game

== Game summaries ==
=== Waynesburg ===
Week 7: Waynesburg at Fairmont State

Team	1	2	3	4	Total
Waynesburg	0	0	0	0	0
• Fairmont State	0	0	0	7	7

- Date: November 4
- Location: Fairmont, WV
- Game attendance: 10,000

Scoring summary
4	FAIRMONT	Robison 16-yard pass from Michael (John Huff kick)	FAIRMONT 7–0

On November 4, the Falcons defeated defending NAIA national champion Waynesburg. Waynesburg was ranked No. 1 in the NAIA, had averaged 63 points and 488 yards per game to that point in the season, and was on an 18-game winning streak. Fairmont was ranked No. 8 prior to the game. The game, played at Fairfield, was attended by an estimated 10,000 fans, the largest crowd in Fairmont history. The game remained scoreless until the final minute of the games. Fairmont's defense held Waynesburg to 68 yards of total offense and did not give up a first down in the second half. In the final 40 seconds, Fairmont quarterback Roy Michael threw a 16-yard touchdown pass to wingback Ron Robison.

=== NAIA semifinals: Northern Michigan ===
NAIA semifinal: N. Michigan at Fairmont State

Team	1	2	3	4	Total
Northern Michigan	0	7	0	0	7
• Fairmont State	7	7	7	0	21

- Date: November 25
- Location: Fairmont, WV
- Game attendance: 7,000

Scoring summary
1	FAIRMONT	George Edwards 19-yard pass from John Kara (John Huff kick)	FAIRMONT 7–0
2	FAIRMONT	Ron Robison, 3-yard run (John Huff kick)	FAIRMONT 14–0
2	N. MICH.	Ron Stump 24-yard pass from Lloyd Carr (Gene Grady kick)	FAIRMONT 14–7
3	FAIRMONT	David Coe 14-yard pass from Roy Michael (Huff kick)	FAIRMONT 21–7

On November 25, Fairmont defeated previously unbeaten Northern Michigan, 21–7, in the NAIA eastern semifinal game. The game was played on a muddy field in Fairmont. Fairmont scored in the first quarter on a 19-yard touchdown pass from John Kara to George Edwards, then increased its lead in the second quarter on a three-yard touchdown run by Ron Robison.

The Fairmont defense held Northern Michigan to 33 yards on the ground and intercepted three Northern Michigan passes. Lloyd Carr, later inducted as a coach into the College Football Hall of Fame, was the quarterback for Northern Michigan. With 43 second remaining in the first half, Carr threw a 24-yard touchdown pass to Ron Stump.

Northern Michigan returned the opening kickoff of the second half for 60 yards. The Wildcats drove deep into Fairmont territory for a potential tying score, but fullback Lonnie Holton fumbled a pitchout at the four-yard line, and Fairmont defensive back Sonny Bartic recovered the loose ball. Northern Michigan coach Rollie Dotsch said afterward that the fumble "ruined our momentum" and was "one of the key turning points."

Fairmont scored its final touchdown late in the third quarter on a 14-yard touchdown pass from Roy Michael to tight end David Coe.

=== Champion Bowl: Eastern Washington ===
Champion Bowl: E. Washington vs Fairmont State

Team	1	2	3	4	Total
Eastern Washington	0	14	0	7	21
• Fairmont State	0	7	14	7	28

- Date: December 9
- Location: Morgantown, WV
- Game attendance: 12,250 (est)

Scoring summary
2	E. WASH.	Dave Svendsen 3-yard pass from Bill Diedrick (Pat Zlateff kick)	E. WASH. 7–0
2	E. WASH.	Zlateff 34-yard pass from Diedrick (Zlateff kick)	E. WASH. 14–0
2	FAIRMONT	Larry Blackstone 1-yard run (John Huff kick)	E. WASH 14–7
3	FAIRMONT	Jim Mertens 18-yard pass from Roy Michael (Huff kick)	TIE 14–14
3	FAIRMONT	Blackstone 1-yard run (Huff kick)	FAIRMONT 21–14
4	E. WASH.	Rick Hardie 31-yard pass from Roy Stookey (Zlateff kick)	TIE 21–21
4	FAIRMONT	George Edwards 27-yard run (Huff kick)	FAIRMONT 28–21

On December 9, the Falcons defeated Eastern Washington in the Champion Bowl to win the NAIA national championship. The game was played at Mountaineer Field in Morgantown, West Virginia.

Eastern Washington took a 14–0 lead on a pair of touchdown passes by quarterback Bill Diedrick. Fairmont capitalized on mistakes to come from behind in the third quarter. On the opening kickoff of the second half, Rick Hardie fumbled at the 20-yard line, and George Edwards recovered the fumble for Fairmont. Three plays later, Roy Michael threw an 18-yard touchdown pass to Jim Mertens. Three minutes later, Eastern Washington turned the ball over again as the center snapped the ball over the head of the punter. Fairmont took over at the one-yard line and promptly took the lead on a one-yard run by Larry Blackstone.

== Awards and honors ==
Coach Duvall was unanimously selected by the WVIAC coaches as the "Football Coach of the Year".

Senior Larry Blackstone played offensive fullback and defensive end and led the team with 1,292 rushing yards. He was selected as the "Back of the Year" by the conference coaches and was also named as a first-team defensive end on the NAIA All-America teams selected by the NAIA and the UPI. His twin brother Barry Blackstone was a starter at the other defensive end position for Fairmont.

== Roster ==
=== Offense ===
- Larry Blackstone, fullback, No. 33
- David Coe, tight end, No. 84
- George Edwards, tailback, No. 43
- Roger Hill, tackle, No. 71
- John Huff, guard and place-kicker, No. 67
- John Kara, quarterback, No. 10
- Rick Merrill, center, No. 51
- Jim Mertens, split end, No. 82
- Roy Michael, quarterback, No. 13
- Jack Reagan, guard, No. 61
- Jim Reynolds, guard, No. 70
- Ron Robison, wingback, No. 20
- George Shreyer, tackle, No. 72

=== Defense ===
- Martin Bartic, linebacker, No. 42
- Barry Blackstone, defensive end, No. 41
- Larry Blackstone, defensive end, No. 33
- Roy Dowell, defensive tackle, No. 79
- Bill Ewusiak, safety, No. 21
- Matt Fortier, defensive tackle, No. 75
- Mike Marra, cornerback, No. 30
- Jim Mertins, defensive halfback, No. 82
- Ron Robison, safety, No. 20
- George Shreyer, defensive tackle, No. 72
- Tom Swisher, linebacker, No. 63
- Mark Tennant, cornerback, No. 85
- Dave Williams, middle guard, No. 74
- Marvin Williams, middle guard, No. 86

== Coaching staff ==
- Head coach: Harold "Deacon" Duvall
- Athletic director: Wilford Wilson
- Defensive line coach: Joe Bundy
- Offensive line coach: William Kerr
- Freshman coach: Larry Hill
