= 1926 West Virginia Mountaineers football team =

American college football season

1926 West Virginia Mountaineers football
- Conference: West Virginia Athletic Conference
- Record: 6–4 (2–0 WVAC)
- Head coach: Ira Rodgers (2nd season)
- Captain: Ross McHenry
- Home stadium: Mountaineer Field

1926 West Virginia Athletic Conference football standings
	Conf.					Overall
Team	W		L		T	W		L		T
West Virginia Wesleyan $	4	–	1	–	0	4	–	6	–	0
Marshall	3	–	1	–	0	5	–	4	–	1
Concord	3	–	1	–	0	6	–	1	–	1
Salem	5	–	2	–	0	5	–	2	–	0
Davis & Elkins	3	–	2	–	0	4	–	4	–	0
Glenville State	3	–	2	–	0	3	–	2	–	0
Potomac State	2	–	2	–	0	3	–	2	–	0
Broaddus	2	–	3	–	0	2	–	4	–	0
New River State	1	–	3	–	0	2	–	3	–	0
Fairmont State	1	–	6	–	0	1	–	6	–	0
West Virginia *	2	–	0	–	0	6	–	4	–	0
West Liberty State *	2	–	0	–	0	6	–	3	–	0
Bethany (WV) *	0	–	3	–	0	2	–	5	–	2
Morris Harvey *	0	–	3	–	0	3	–	6	–	0
Shepherd *	0	–	3	–	0	2	–	4	–	0
$ – Conference champion; * – Did not qualify for conference standings Ties did not count in conference standings.

The 1926 West Virginia Mountaineers football team represented West Virginia University as a member of the West Virginia Athletic Conference (WVAC) during the 1926 college football season. In their second season under head coach Ira Rodgers, the Mountaineers compiled a 6–4 record and outscored opponents by a combined total of 141 to 93. The team played its home games at Mountaineer Field in Morgantown, West Virginia. Ross McHenry was the team captain.

== Schedule ==
Date	Opponent	Site	Result	Attendance	Source
September 25	Davis & Elkins	Mountaineer Field; Morgantown, WV	W 18–6		
October 2	vs. Washington and Lee*	Laidley Field; Charleston, WV	W 18–0		
October 9	Allegheny*	Mountaineer Field; Morgantown, WV	W 54–0		
October 16	at Georgetown*	Griffith Stadium; Washington, DC	W 13–10	30,000	
October 23	West Virginia Wesleyan	Mountaineer Field; Morgantown, WV	W 7–0		
October 30	Missouri*	Mountaineer Field; Morgantown, WV	L 0–27		
November 6	at Pittsburgh*	Pitt Stadium; Pittsburgh, PA (rivalary)	L 7–17	30,000	
November 13	vs. Centre*	Parkersburg, WV	W 21–0		
November 20	at Carnegie Tech*	Forbes Field; Pittsburgh, PA	L 0–20	12,000	
November 25	Washington & Jefferson*	Mountaineer Field; Morgantown, WV	L 3–13		
*Non-conference game
