= 1957 Fairmont State Falcons football team =

American college football season

1957 Fairmont State Falcons football

WVIAC champion
- Conference: West Virginia Intercollegiate Athletic Conference
- Record: 7–0 (7–0 WVIAC)
- Head coach: Harold "Deacon" Duvall (6th season)

1957 West Virginia Intercollegiate Athletic Conference football standings
	Conf.					Overall
Team	W		L		T	W		L		T
Fairmont State $	7	–	0	–	0	7	–	0	–	0
West Virginia Tech	3	–	1	–	1	4	–	4	–	1
West Virginia State	2	–	1	–	1	2	–	4	–	2
Glenville State	3	–	2	–	1	3	–	2	–	1
Concord	2	–	2	–	1	2	–	4	–	1
Shepherd	2	–	2	–	0	3	–	4	–	0
West Liberty State	2	–	3	–	1	2	–	6	–	1
Potomac State	2	–	3	–	1	2	–	4	–	1
Salem	2	–	5	–	0	2	–	5	–	0
West Virginia Wesleyan	1	–	4	–	0	1	–	6	–	0
Davis & Elkins	0	–	5	–	0	2	–	5	–	0
Bluefield State *	1	–	0	–	0	6	–	2	–	0
Bethany (WV) *	1	–	0	–	0	5	–	3	–	0
$ – Conference champion; * – Did not qualify for conference standings Conference standings based on power ratings

The 1957 Fairmont State Falcons football team was an American football team that represented Fairmont State University as a member of the West Virginia Intercollegiate Athletic Conference (WVIAC) during the 1957 NAIA football season. In their sixth season under head coach Harold "Deacon" Duvall, the Falcons compiled a perfect 7–0 record (also 7–0 in conference games), won the WVIAC championship, and outscored opponents by a total of 147 to 42.

Quarterback Rich Newbrough led the team in total offense (574 yards) and passing (35 of 64 passes for 475 yards, a .547 completion percentage, and four touchdowns). Other statistical leaders included Don Fontana with 19 receptions for 237 yards and George Murphy with 346 rushing yards and 24 points scored. Moses Guin also ranked among the team's leading rushers.

Three Fairmont players were selected as first-team players on the 1957 All-WVIAC football team: back George Murphy; end Rbert Reiber; and tackle Don Bennett.

The team played its home games in Fairmont, West Virginia.

== Schedule ==
Date	Opponent	Site	Result	Attendance	Source
September 21	Shepherd	Fairmont, WV	W 15–14		
September 28	Glenville	Fairmont, WV	W 32–13		
October 5	at West Virginia Wesleyan	Buckhannon, WV	W 19–0		
October 12	Concord	Athens, WV	W 20–0	2,000	
October 18	Salem	Fairmont, WV	W 27–0		
October 26	at West Liberty	Shadyside, OH	W 13–9		
November 9	at Potomac State	Keyser, WV	W 21–6		
