= 1927 West Virginia Mountaineers football team =

American college football season

1927 West Virginia Mountaineers football
- Conference: West Virginia Athletic Conference
- Record: 2–4–3 (2–0 WVAC)
- Head coach: Ira Rodgers (3rd season)
- Captain: Winchester Latham
- Home stadium: Mountaineer Field

1927 West Virginia Athletic Conference football standings
	Conf.					Overall
Team	W		L		T	W		L		T
West Liberty State $	4	–	0	–	0	6	–	1	–	1
Marshall	4	–	1	–	0	5	–	3	–	1
Davis & Elkins	3	–	1	–	0	5	–	5	–	0
West Virginia Wesleyan	3	–	1	–	0	3	–	6	–	1
Salem	4	–	2	–	0	5	–	2	–	0
Glenville State	4	–	2	–	2	4	–	2	–	2
Potomac State	2	–	2	–	0	2	–	3	–	1
Broaddus	2	–	3	–	1	2	–	5	–	1
Shepherd	0	–	3	–	0	4	–	3	–	0
Fairmont State	0	–	4	–	3	0	–	5	–	3
New River State	0	–	6	–	0	0	–	6	–	0
West Virginia *	2	–	0	–	0	2	–	4	–	3
Concord *	2	–	1	–	0	6	–	3	–	1
Morris Harvey *	1	–	2	–	0	3	–	4	–	1
$ – Conference champion; * – Did not qualify for conference standings Ties did not count in conference standings.

The 1927 West Virginia Mountaineers football team was an American football team that represented West Virginia University as a member of the West Virginia Athletic Conference (WVAC) during the 1927 college football season. In its third season under head coach Ira Rodgers, the team compiled a 2–4–3 record and was outscored by a total of 129 to 68. The team played its home games at Mountaineer Field in Morgantown, West Virginia. Winchester Latham was the team captain.

== Schedule ==
Date	Opponent	Site	Result	Attendance	Source
September 24	West Virginia Wesleyan	Mountaineer Field; Morgantown, WV	W 27–7	10,000	
October 1	vs. Washington and Lee*	Laidley Field; Charleston, WV	T 6–6		
October 8	at Pittsburgh*	Pitt Stadium; Pittsburgh, PA (rivalry)	L 0–40	18,000−20,000	
October 15	Lafayette*	Mountaineer Field; Morgantown, WV	T 7–7		
October 22	at Georgetown*	Griffith Stadium; Washington, DC	L 0–25	20,000	
October 29	Carnegie Tech*	Mountaineer Field; Morgantown, WV	L 7–13		
November 5	at Missouri*	Memorial Stadium; Columbia, MO	L 0–13		
November 12	Davis & Elkins	Mountaineer Field; Morgantown, WV	W 15–12	5,000	
November 24	Washington & Jefferson*	Mountaineer Field; Morgantown, WV	T 6–6	15,000	
*Non-conference game
