= 1925 West Virginia Mountaineers football team =

American college football season

1925 West Virginia Mountaineers football
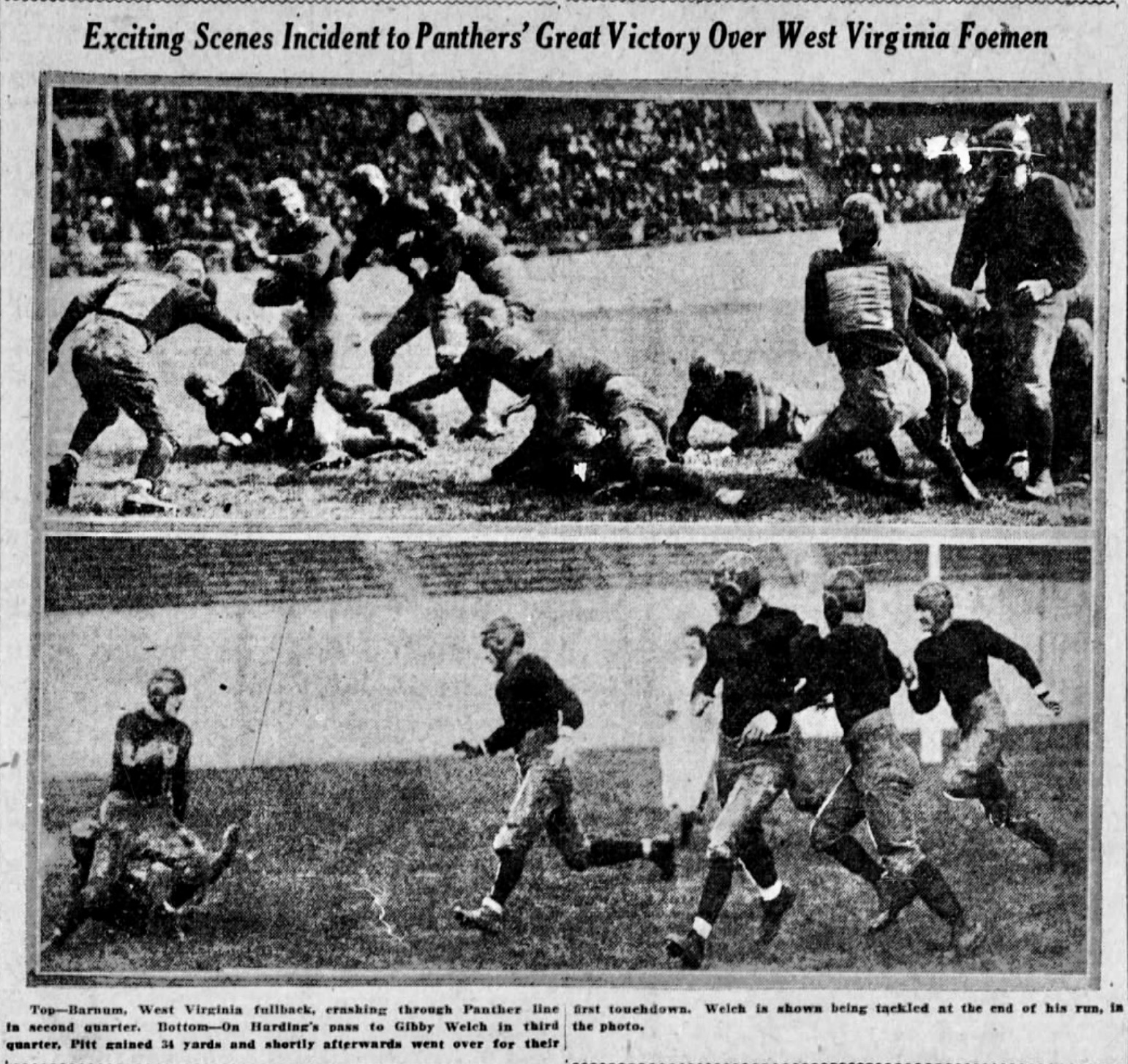
- Photos of the Pitt versus West Virginia football game, 1925
- Conference: West Virginia Athletic Conference
- Record: 8–1 (2–0 WVAC)
- Head coach: Ira Rodgers (1st season)
- Captain: Walter Mahan
- Home stadium: Mountaineer Field

1925 West Virginia Athletic Conference football standings
	Conf.					Overall
Team	W		L		T	W		L		T
Marshall $	3	–	0	–	2	4	–	1	–	4
New River State	3	–	1	–	1	5	–	1	–	2
West Virginia Wesleyan	3	–	1	–	0	5	–	3	–	0
Davis & Elkins	4	–	2	–	0	7	–	3	–	0
Salem	4	–	2	–	1	5	–	2	–	2
Fairmont State	1	–	1	–	3	7	–	1	–	2
Potomac State	1	–	1	–	2	1	–	2	–	2
Broaddus	2	–	3	–	1	2	–	5	–	1
West Liberty State	1	–	3	–	0	1	–	6	–	1
Glenville State	0	–	5	–	1	0	–	6	–	1
West Virginia *	2	–	0	–	0	8	–	1	–	0
Concord *	1	–	2	–	0	4	–	3	–	1
Shepherd *	0	–	1	–	1	4	–	2	–	1
Morris Harvey *	0	–	3	–	0	1	–	6	–	0
$ – Conference champion; * – Did not qualify for conference standings Ties did not count in conference standings.

The 1925 West Virginia Mountaineers football team was an American football team that represented West Virginia University as a member of the West Virginia Athletic Conference (WVAC) during the 1925 college football season. In its first season under head coach Ira Rodgers, the team compiled an 8–1 record, shut out seven of nine opponents, allowed only two touchdowns during the season, and outscored opponents by a total of 175 to 18.

The team played its home games at the newly-constructed Mountaineer Field in Morgantown, West Virginia. The dedication ceremony for the new stadium was conducted on November 14, 1925.

Guard Walter Mahan was selected as second-team All-Americans. Mahan was also the team captain.

== Schedule ==
Date	Opponent	Site	Result	Attendance	Source
September 26	vs. Allegheny*	Erie, PA	W 18–0		
October 3	Davis & Elkins	Mountaineer Stadium; Morgantown, WV	W 6–0		
October 10	at Pittsburgh*	Pitt Stadium; Pittsburgh, PA (rivalry)	L 7–15		
October 17	Grove City*	Mountaineer Stadium; Morgantown, WV	W 54–3		
October 24	West Virginia Wesleyan	Mountaineer Field; Morgantown, WV	W 16–0	8,000	
October 31	vs. Washington and Lee*	Laidley Field; Charleston, WV	W 21–0		
November 7	at Boston College*	Braves Field; Boston, MA	W 20–0		
November 14	Penn State*	Mountaineer Field; Morgantown, WV (rivalry)	W 14–0	18,000	
November 26	Washington & Jefferson*	Mountaineer Field; Morgantown, WV	W 19–0	23,000	
*Non-conference game
