= Harold "Deacon" Duvall =

American football player and coach (1917–2014)

Biographical details
- Born: January 11, 1917; Fairmont, West Virginia, U.S.
- Died: October 16, 2014 (aged 97); Fairmont, West Virginia, U.S.

Playing career
- 1934–1947: Fairmont State

Coaching career (HC unless noted)
- 1941–1942: Barackville HS (WV)
- 1946–1951: Rivesville HS (WV)
- 1952–1971: Fairmont State

Head coaching record
- Overall: 125–42–3 (college)
- Tournaments: 2–1 (NAIA playoffs)

Accomplishments and honors

Championships
- 1 NAIA (1967); 8 WVIAC (1952, 1957, 1959–1960, 1964–1965, 1967, 1969); 2 WVIAC Western Division (1959–1960)

Awards
- NAIA Coach of the Year (1967); WVIAC Coach of the Year (1967); Fairmont State Hall of Fame (1993); West Virginia Sports Hall of Fame (1977); NAIA Hall of Fame (1987)

Harold S. "Deacon" Duvall (January 11, 1917 – October 16, 2014) was an American football coach. He served as the head football coach at Fairmont State College—now known as Fairmont State University—in Fairmont, West Virginia from 1952 to 1971, compiling a record of 125–42–3. Duvall led the Fighting Falcons to the NAIA Football National Championship in 1967.

Duvall attended Fairmont Senior High School before moving on to Fairmont State College, from which he earned an A.B. degree. He later received a Master of Arts degree from Columbia University.

== Head coaching record ==
Year	Team	Overall	Conference	Standing	Bowl/playoffs
Fairmont State Fighting Falcons (West Virginia Intercollegiate Athletic Conference) (1952–1971)
1952	Fairmont State	6–0	5–0	1st	
1953	Fairmont State	5–2	4–2	3rd	
1954	Fairmont State	3–5	3–5	8th	
1955	Fairmont State	6–3	6–3	4th	
1956	Fairmont State	7–1	7–1	2nd	
1957	Fairmont State	7–0	7–0	1st	
1958	Fairmont State	5–2–1	5–2–1	4th	
1959	Fairmont State	9–0	8–0	1st (Western)	
1960	Fairmont State	8–1	7–1	1st (Western)	
1961	Fairmont State	4–5	4–4	3rd (Western)	
1962	Fairmont State	3–3–2	1–4–2	5th (Western)	
1963	Fairmont State	3–5	3–4	4th (Western)	
1964	Fairmont State	8–1	7–0	1st	
1965	Fairmont State	8–1	7–0	1st	L NAIA Semifinal
1966	Fairmont State	7–1	6–1	2nd	
1967	Fairmont State	11–0	7–0	1st	W NAIA Championship
1968	Fairmont State	6–2	3–1	T–2nd	
1969	Fairmont State	8–1	6–0	1st	
1970	Fairmont State	4–6	2–4	8th	
1971	Fairmont State	7–3	5–1	2nd	
Fairmont State:		125–42–3	103–33–3		
Total:		125–42–3			
National championship Conference title Conference division title or championship game berth
