= 1926 Marshall Thundering Herd football team =

American college football season

1926 Marshall Thundering Herd football
- Conference: West Virginia Athletic Conference
- Record: 5–4–1 (3–1 WVAC)
- Head coach: Charles Tallman (2nd season)
- Captain: Marion "Cy" Meredith
- Home stadium: Central Field

1926 West Virginia Athletic Conference football standings
	Conf.					Overall
Team	W		L		T	W		L		T
West Virginia Wesleyan $	4	–	1	–	0	4	–	6	–	0
Marshall	3	–	1	–	0	5	–	4	–	1
Concord	3	–	1	–	0	6	–	1	–	1
Salem	5	–	2	–	0	5	–	2	–	0
Davis & Elkins	3	–	2	–	0	4	–	4	–	0
Glenville State	3	–	2	–	0	3	–	2	–	0
Potomac State	2	–	2	–	0	3	–	2	–	0
Broaddus	2	–	3	–	0	2	–	4	–	0
New River State	1	–	3	–	0	2	–	3	–	0
Fairmont State	1	–	6	–	0	1	–	6	–	0
West Virginia *	2	–	0	–	0	6	–	4	–	0
West Liberty State *	2	–	0	–	0	6	–	3	–	0
Bethany (WV) *	0	–	3	–	0	2	–	5	–	2
Morris Harvey *	0	–	3	–	0	3	–	6	–	0
Shepherd *	0	–	3	–	0	2	–	4	–	0
$ – Conference champion; * – Did not qualify for conference standings Ties did not count in conference standings.

The 1926 Marshall Thundering Herd football team was an American football team that represented Marshall College (now Marshall University) in the West Virginia Athletic Conference during the 1926 college football season. In its second season under head coach Charles Tallman, the team compiled a 5–4–1 record, 3–1 against conference opponents, and outscored opponents by a total of 150 to 99.

== Schedule ==
Date	Opponent	Site	Result	Source
September 25	Broaddus	Central Field; Huntington, WV	W 14–0	
October 1	Eastern Kentucky*	Central Field; Huntington, WV	W 34–0	
October 9	at Transylvania*	Lexington, KY	W 32–6	
October 16	Grove City*	Central Field; Huntington, WV	L 0–27	
October 23	Concord	Central Field; Huntington, WV	L 0–6	
October 30	at St. Xavier*	Corcoran Field; Cincinnati, OH	L 6–20	
November 6	New River State	Central Field; Huntington, WV	W 6–0	
November 12	Fairmont State	Central Field; Huntington, WV	W 55–13	
November 20	at Louisville*	Parkway Field; Louisville, KY	L 3–27	
November 25	Hampden–Sydney*^{†}	Central Field; Huntington, WV	T 0–0	
*Non-conference game; ^{†}Homecoming
