= 1927 Marshall Thundering Herd football team =

American college football season

1927 Marshall Thundering Herd football
- Conference: West Virginia Athletic Conference
- Record: 5–3–1 (4–1 WVAC)
- Head coach: Charles Tallman (3rd season)
- Captain: Ralph Young
- Home stadium: Central Field

1927 West Virginia Athletic Conference football standings
	Conf.					Overall
Team	W		L		T	W		L		T
West Liberty State $	4	–	0	–	0	6	–	1	–	1
Marshall	4	–	1	–	0	5	–	3	–	1
Davis & Elkins	3	–	1	–	0	5	–	5	–	0
West Virginia Wesleyan	3	–	1	–	0	3	–	6	–	1
Salem	4	–	2	–	0	5	–	2	–	0
Glenville State	4	–	2	–	2	4	–	2	–	2
Potomac State	2	–	2	–	0	2	–	3	–	1
Broaddus	2	–	3	–	1	2	–	5	–	1
Shepherd	0	–	3	–	0	4	–	3	–	0
Fairmont State	0	–	4	–	3	0	–	5	–	3
New River State	0	–	6	–	0	0	–	6	–	0
West Virginia *	2	–	0	–	0	2	–	4	–	3
Concord *	2	–	1	–	0	6	–	3	–	1
Morris Harvey *	1	–	2	–	0	3	–	4	–	1
$ – Conference champion; * – Did not qualify for conference standings Ties did not count in conference standings.

The 1927 Marshall Thundering Herd football team was an American football team that represented Marshall College (now Marshall University) in the West Virginia Athletic Conference during the 1927 college football season. In its third season under head coach Charles Tallman, the team compiled a 5–3–1 record, 4–1 against conference opponents, and outscored opponents by a total of 194 to 75.

== Schedule ==
Date	Opponent	Site	Result
September 24	Broaddus	Central Field; Huntington, WV	W 33–6
October 1	at John Carroll*	University Heights, OH	T 6–6
October 8	Concord	Central Field; Huntington, WV	W 18–6
October 14	at Ohio Wesleyan*	Delaware, OH	L 0–7
October 22	Louisville*	Central Field; Huntington, WV	W 37–6
October 29	at Canisius*	Buffalo, NY	L 0–19
November 3	at New River State	Montgomery, WV	W 65–0
November 12	Fairmont State	Central Field; Huntington, WV	W 35–6
November 24	West Virginia Wesleyan^{†}	Central Field; Huntington, WV	L 0–19
*Non-conference game; ^{†}Homecoming
