= 1925 Marshall Thundering Herd football team =

American college football season

1925 Marshall Thundering Herd football

WVAC champion
- Conference: West Virginia Athletic Conference
- Record: 4–1–4 (3–0–2 WVAC)
- Head coach: Charles Tallman (1st season)
- Captain: Frank Crist
- Home stadium: Central Field

1925 West Virginia Athletic Conference football standings
	Conf.					Overall
Team	W		L		T	W		L		T
Marshall $	3	–	0	–	2	4	–	1	–	4
New River State	3	–	1	–	1	5	–	1	–	2
West Virginia Wesleyan	3	–	1	–	0	5	–	3	–	0
Davis & Elkins	4	–	2	–	0	7	–	3	–	0
Salem	4	–	2	–	1	5	–	2	–	2
Fairmont State	1	–	1	–	3	7	–	1	–	2
Potomac State	1	–	1	–	2	1	–	2	–	2
Broaddus	2	–	3	–	1	2	–	5	–	1
West Liberty State	1	–	3	–	0	1	–	6	–	1
Glenville State	0	–	5	–	1	0	–	6	–	1
West Virginia *	2	–	0	–	0	8	–	1	–	0
Concord *	1	–	2	–	0	4	–	3	–	1
Shepherd *	0	–	1	–	1	4	–	2	–	1
Morris Harvey *	0	–	3	–	0	1	–	6	–	0
$ – Conference champion; * – Did not qualify for conference standings Ties did not count in conference standings.

The 1925 Marshall Thundering Herd football team was an American football team that represented Marshall College (now Marshall University) in the West Virginia Athletic Conference during the 1925 college football season. In its first season under head coach Charles Tallman, the team compiled a 4–1–4 record, 3–0–2 against conference opponents, won the WVAC championship, and outscored opponents by a total of 138 to 29.

== Schedule ==
Date	Opponent	Site	Result	Source
September 26	Glenville State	Central Field; Huntington, WV	W 26–0	
October 3	Concord	Central Field; Huntington, WV	W 13–0	
October 10	at Marietta*	Marietta, OH	T 0–0	
October 18	New River State	Central Field; Huntington, WV	T 6–6	
October 24	Transylvania*	Central Field; Huntington, WV	T 0–0	
October 31	at Salem	Salem, WV	T 14–14	
November 7	Wilmington (OH)*	Central Field; Huntington, WV	W 19–0	
November 14	Morris Harvey	Central Field; Huntington, WV	W 58–2	
November 26	Louisville*^{†}	Central Field; Huntington, WV	L 2–7	
*Non-conference game; ^{†}Homecoming
