= William Kerr (American football) =

American football and wrestling coach

Biographical details
- Born: March 14, 1915; Fairmont, West Virginia, U.S.
- Died: June 21, 2005 (aged 90); Tempe, Arizona, U.S.

Coaching career (HC unless noted)

Football
- 1947–1954: Fairmont Senior HS (WV) (assistant)
- 1955–1962: Fairmont Senior HS (WV)
- 1963–1971: Fairmont State (assistant)
- 1972–1977: Fairmont State

Wrestling
- 1963–1971: Fairmont State

Head coaching record
- Overall: 29–29–1 (college football)

Accomplishments and honors

Championships
- Football; 2 WVIAC (1973–1974); 2 WVIAC Northern Division (1973–1974)

William Kerr (March 14, 1915 – June 21, 2005) was an American football and wrestling coach. He served as the head football coach at Fairmont State University in Fairmont, West Virginia from 1972 to 1977, compiling a record of 29–29–1.

== Head coaching record ==
=== College football ===
Year	Team	Overall	Conference	Standing	Bowl/playoffs
Fairmont State Fighting Falcons (West Virginia Intercollegiate Athletic Conference) (1972–1977)
1972	Fairmont State	2–7	1–5	8th	
1973	Fairmont State	6–3–1	3–0	1st (Northern)	
1974	Fairmont State	7–4	4–0	1st (Northern)	
1975	Fairmont State	6–4	2–2	T–2nd (Northern)	
1976	Fairmont State	4–6	1–3	4th (Northern)	
1977	Fairmont State	4–5	0–4	5th (Northern)	
Fairmont State:		29–29–1	11–14		
Total:		29–29–1			
National championship Conference title Conference division title or championship game berth
