= Ira Rodgers =

American athlete and coach (1895–1963)

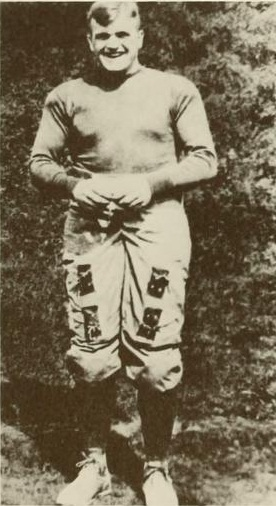

Biographical details
- Born: May 26, 1895; Bethany, West Virginia, U.S.
- Died: February 15, 1963 (aged 67); Morgantown, West Virginia, U.S.

Playing career

Football
- 1915–1917: West Virginia
- 1919: West Virginia

Basketball
- 1915–1919: West Virginia

Baseball
- 1916–1919: West Virginia
- Positions: Fullback, quarterback (football); Shortstop (baseball)

Coaching career (HC unless noted)

Football
- 1920–1924: West Virginia (assistant)
- 1925–1930: West Virginia
- 1943–1945: West Virginia

Baseball
- 1921–1946: West Virginia

Head coaching record
- Overall: 44–31–8 (football); 204–208–3 (baseball)

Accomplishments and honors

Awards
- Consensus All-American (1919); West Virginia Mountaineers football No. 21 retired
- College Football Hall of Fame; Inducted in 1957 (profile)

Ira Errett "Rat" Rodgers (May 26, 1895 – February 15, 1963) was an American football, basketball, baseball, and golf player and coach. He played college football for West Virginia University where he was selected as an All-American in 1919. He also served as the school's head football coach from 1925 to 1930 and again from 1943 to 1945.

== Collegiate career ==
"Rajah" Rodgers of West Virginia
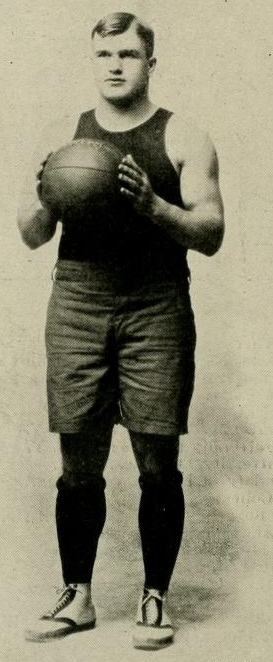
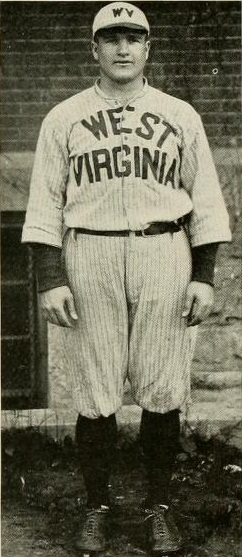

Rodgers was a high school standout football player, who was recruited by powerhouse schools such as the University of Pittsburgh and Washington & Jefferson College. In 1915, however, Mountaineer coach Mont McIntyre won the honors of Rodgers, who started his first game of the season as a quarterback. He played quarterback most of his freshman season, until later in the season when he was moved to fullback. He played fullback for the next three years of his career. He was a member of the Sigma Nu fraternity on campus.

As a senior, in 1919, Rodgers had one of the greatest seasons of any player from West Virginia University. Rodgers led the nation in scoring with 147 points on 19 touchdowns and 33 extra-point kicks. He also threw 11 touchdown passes, which was a rare feat for that era and a WVU record until 1949. Rodgers earned consensus All-American honors that season, the first All-American in WVU history.

Rodgers is considered one of the greatest players of his era, and one of the greatest athletes in Mountaineer history. Rodgers was the first Mountaineer to rush for more than 200 yards in a game. He also holds the school record for the most rushing touchdowns season (19). His record of most touchdowns in a career (42), was broken by running back Steve Slaton who rushed for his 50th touchdown in 2007. Rodgers also threw 24 touchdown passes in his career as well.

Rodgers has been a long-time member of the West Virginia University Athletics Hall of Fame and was inducted into the College Football Hall of Fame in 1953.

== Baseball career ==
Rodgers' baseball skills led to a professional offer from Connie Mack, the long-time manager of the Philadelphia Athletics, but he chose instead to remain at West Virginia to teach and coach. He was the Mountaineer baseball coach for 23 years. During summer months, Rodgers did play and manage some professional baseball including a stint as the player-manager of the Kinston Highwaymen of the "outlaw" Eastern Carolina Baseball Association in 1922.

== Coaching career ==
After his honorable playing career, Rodgers moved on to coach the Mountaineers in football, baseball and golf. He compiled a 41–31–8 mark as a football coach and a 204–208–3 mark as a baseball coach.

== Head coaching record ==
=== Football ===
Year	Team	Overall	Conference	Standing	Bowl/playoffs
West Virginia Mountaineers (West Virginia Intercollegiate Athletic Conference) (1925–1927)
1925	West Virginia	8–1	2–0	NA	
1926	West Virginia	6–4	2–0	NA	
1927	West Virginia	2–4–3	2–0	NA	
West Virginia Mountaineers (Independent) (1928–1930)
1928	West Virginia	8–2			
1929	West Virginia	4–3–3			
1930	West Virginia	5–5			
West Virginia Mountaineers (Independent) (1943–1945)
1943	West Virginia	4–3			
1944	West Virginia	5–3–1			
1945	West Virginia	2–6–1			
West Virginia:		41–31–8	6–0		
Total:		41–31–8			
