= 1931 Dayton Flyers football team =

American college football season

1931 Dayton Flyers football
- Conference: Ohio Athletic Conference
- Record: 5–3–2 (0–0–1 OAC)
- Head coach: Harry Baujan (9th season)
- Home stadium: University of Dayton Stadium

1931 Ohio Athletic Conference football standings
	Conf.					Overall
Team	W		L		T	W		L		T
Muskingum $	4	–	0	–	0	8	–	0	–	0
Western Reserve	3	–	0	–	0	3	–	5	–	1
Baldwin–Wallace	4	–	0	–	1	5	–	0	–	3
Otterbein	5	–	1	–	0	5	–	3	–	0
Mount Union	4	–	1	–	0	7	–	2	–	1
Ohio Northern	3	–	1	–	0	6	–	2	–	0
Case	4	–	1	–	1	4	–	3	–	1
Xavier	1	–	0	–	1	4	–	3	–	1
Heidelberg	2	–	1	–	0	3	–	4	–	0
Dayton	0	–	0	–	1	5	–	3	–	2
Kenyon	3	–	3	–	0	4	–	3	–	0
Oberlin	2	–	3	–	0	3	–	4	–	1
Wooster	2	–	4	–	0	4	–	5	–	0
Ashland	2	–	6	–	0	2	–	6	–	0
Capital	1	–	4	–	0	1	–	5	–	1
Marietta	1	–	4	–	0	1	–	7	–	0
Akron	0	–	6	–	0	1	–	7	–	0
Hiram	0	–	6	–	0	0	–	8	–	0
$ – Conference champion

The 1931 Dayton Flyers football team was an American football team that represented the University of Dayton as a member of the Ohio Athletic Conference during the 1931 college football season. In its ninth season under head coach Harry Baujan, the team compiled a 5–3–2 record.

== Schedule ==
Date	Opponent	Site	Result	Attendance	Source
September 25	Hanover	University of Dayton Stadium; Dayton, OH	W 39–0	4,500	
October 3	at Boston College	Fenway Park; Boston, MA	L 0–13		
October 9	Wilmington	University of Dayton Stadium; Dayton, OH	W 56–0		
October 16	West Virginia Wesleyan	University of Dayton Stadium; Dayton, OH	L 7–13		
October 23	Butler	University of Dayton Stadium; Dayton, OH	W 26–2		
October 31	Transylvania	University of Dayton Stadium; Dayton, OH	W 63–0		
November 7	at Xavier	Corcoran Field; Cincinnati, OH	T 7–7	10,000	
November 14	at John Carroll	Cleveland, OH	W 27–0		
November 21	Wittenberg	University of Dayton Stadium; Dayton, OH	L 6–21		
November 28	Notre Dame "B"	University of Dayton Stadium; Dayton, OH	T 6–6		
