= 1931 Muskingum Fighting Muskies football team =

American college football season

1931 Muskingum Fighting Muskies football

OAC champion
- Conference: Ohio Athletic Conference
- Record: 8–0 (4–0 OAC)
- Head coach: Bill Lange (9th season)
- Home stadium: McConagha Stadium

1931 Ohio Athletic Conference football standings
	Conf.					Overall
Team	W		L		T	W		L		T
Muskingum $	4	–	0	–	0	8	–	0	–	0
Western Reserve	3	–	0	–	0	3	–	5	–	1
Baldwin–Wallace	4	–	0	–	1	5	–	0	–	3
Otterbein	5	–	1	–	0	5	–	3	–	0
Mount Union	4	–	1	–	0	7	–	2	–	1
Ohio Northern	3	–	1	–	0	6	–	2	–	0
Case	4	–	1	–	1	4	–	3	–	1
Xavier	1	–	0	–	1	4	–	3	–	1
Heidelberg	2	–	1	–	0	3	–	4	–	0
Dayton	0	–	0	–	1	5	–	3	–	2
Kenyon	3	–	3	–	0	4	–	3	–	0
Oberlin	2	–	3	–	0	3	–	4	–	1
Wooster	2	–	4	–	0	4	–	5	–	0
Ashland	2	–	6	–	0	2	–	6	–	0
Capital	1	–	4	–	0	1	–	5	–	1
Marietta	1	–	4	–	0	1	–	7	–	0
Akron	0	–	6	–	0	1	–	7	–	0
Hiram	0	–	6	–	0	0	–	8	–	0
$ – Conference champion

The 1931 Muskingum Fighting Muskies football team was an American football team that represented Muskingum University of New Concord, Ohio, as a member of the Ohio Athletic Conference (OAC) during the 1931 college football season. In their ninth season under head coach Bill Lange, the Fighting Muskies compiled a perfect 8–0 record (4–0 against OAC opponents), won the OAC championship, shut out six of eight opponents, and outscored all opponents by a total of 138 to 12.

The 1931 season was one of four perfect seasons in Muskingum football history, along with 1926, 1955, and 1960.

== Schedule ==
Date	Opponent	Site	Result	Attendance	Source
September 25	Wilmington (OH)*	New Concord, OH	W 12–0		
October 2	Findlay*	New Concord, OH	W 21–0		
October 10	at Mount Union	Alliance, OH	W 7–0		
October 16	Bethany (WV)*	Student Stadium; New Concord, OH	W 19–6	2,500	
October 23	Heidelberg	Student Stadium; New Concord, OH	W 21–6	4,500	
October 31	at Cincinnati*	Carson Field; Cincinnati, OH	W 15–0		
November 7	Wooster	New Concord, OH	W 19–0		
November 14	at Ashland	Ashland, OH	W 24–0		
*Non-conference game
