= 1926 Dayton Flyers football team =

American college football season

1926 Dayton Flyers football
- Conference: Ohio Athletic Conference
- Record: 8–2 (3–0 OAC)
- Head coach: Harry Baujan (4th season)
- Home stadium: University of Dayton Stadium

1926 Ohio Athletic Conference football standings
	Conf.					Overall
Team	W		L		T	W		L		T
Muskingum $	7	–	0	–	0	9	–	0	–	0
Dayton	3	–	0	–	0	8	–	2	–	0
St. Xavier	1	–	0	–	0	9	–	1	–	0
Oberlin	6	–	1	–	0	6	–	1	–	0
Wittenberg	4	–	1	–	0	6	–	2	–	0
Ohio Wesleyan	5	–	1	–	1	6	–	2	–	1
Wooster	5	–	2	–	0	6	–	2	–	0
Miami (OH)	4	–	2	–	1	5	–	2	–	1
Ohio	4	–	2	–	1	5	–	2	–	1
Akron	4	–	2	–	2	5	–	2	–	2
Mount Union	5	–	3	–	0	6	–	3	–	0
Case	4	–	2	–	3	4	–	2	–	3
Baldwin–Wallace	3	–	3	–	2	3	–	3	–	2
Western Reserve	3	–	4	–	1	3	–	4	–	1
Heidelberg	2	–	4	–	0	3	–	4	–	0
Cincinnati	2	–	5	–	1	3	–	5	–	1
Denison	2	–	6	–	0	2	–	6	–	1
Otterbein	1	–	5	–	0	2	–	5	–	0
Ohio Northern	1	–	6	–	0	1	–	6	–	0
Kenyon	1	–	6	–	0	1	–	7	–	0
Marietta	1	–	6	–	0	1	–	7	–	0
Hiram	0	–	7	–	0	0	–	7	–	0
$ – Conference champion

The 1926 Dayton Flyers football team was an American football team that represented the University of Dayton as a member of the Ohio Athletic Conference during the 1926 college football season. In its fourth season under head coach Harry Baujan, the team compiled an 8–2 record.

== Schedule ==
Date	Opponent	Site	Result	Attendance	Source
September 25	Bowling Green	University of Dayton Stadium; Dayton, OH	W 11–0		
October 2	Kenyon	University of Dayton Stadium; Dayton, OH	W 15–0	5,000	
October 9	at John Carroll	Luna Park Stadium; Cleveland, OH	W 10–0		
October 16	Haskell	University of Dayton Stadium; Dayton, OH	L 4–30	10,000	
October 23	Wilmington (OH)	University of Dayton Stadium; Dayton, OH	W 14–8		
October 30	at Holy Cross	Fitton Field; Worcester, MA	L 7–20		
November 6	at Cincinnati	Carson Field; Cincinnati, OH	W 52–0	8,000	
October 13	Ohio Northern	University of Dayton Stadium; Dayton, OH	W 21–0		
November 20	Butler	University of Dayton Stadium; Dayton, OH	W 30–6		
November 27	Quantico Marines	University of Dayton Stadium; Dayton, OH	W 7–2		
