= 1926 Akron Zippers football team =

American college football season

1926 Akron Zippers football
- Conference: Ohio Athletic Conference
- Record: 5–2–2 (4–2–2 OAC)
- Head coach: George Babcock (1st season)
- Captain: Frank Wargo
- Home stadium: Buchtel Field

1926 Ohio Athletic Conference football standings
	Conf.					Overall
Team	W		L		T	W		L		T
Muskingum $	7	–	0	–	0	9	–	0	–	0
Dayton	3	–	0	–	0	8	–	2	–	0
St. Xavier	1	–	0	–	0	9	–	1	–	0
Oberlin	6	–	1	–	0	6	–	1	–	0
Wittenberg	4	–	1	–	0	6	–	2	–	0
Ohio Wesleyan	5	–	1	–	1	6	–	2	–	1
Wooster	5	–	2	–	0	6	–	2	–	0
Miami (OH)	4	–	2	–	1	5	–	2	–	1
Ohio	4	–	2	–	1	5	–	2	–	1
Akron	4	–	2	–	2	5	–	2	–	2
Mount Union	5	–	3	–	0	6	–	3	–	0
Case	4	–	2	–	3	4	–	2	–	3
Baldwin–Wallace	3	–	3	–	2	3	–	3	–	2
Western Reserve	3	–	4	–	1	3	–	4	–	1
Heidelberg	2	–	4	–	0	3	–	4	–	0
Cincinnati	2	–	5	–	1	3	–	5	–	1
Denison	2	–	6	–	0	2	–	6	–	1
Otterbein	1	–	5	–	0	2	–	5	–	0
Ohio Northern	1	–	6	–	0	1	–	6	–	0
Kenyon	1	–	6	–	0	1	–	7	–	0
Marietta	1	–	6	–	0	1	–	7	–	0
Hiram	0	–	7	–	0	0	–	7	–	0
$ – Conference champion

The 1926 Akron Zippers football team was an American football team that represented the University of Akron in the Ohio Athletic Conference (OAC) during the 1926 college football season. In its first and only season under head coach George Babcock, the team compiled a 5–2–2 record (4–2–2 against conference opponents) and outscored opponents by a total of 109 to 74. Frank Wargo was the team captain.

== Schedule ==
Date	Opponent	Site	Result	Attendance	Source
September 25	Defiance*	Buchtel Field; Akron, OH	W 15–0		
October 2	Case	Buchtel Field; Akron, OH	T 14–14		
October 9	Ohio	Buchtel Field; Akron, OH	W 3–0	3,000	
October 16	at Hiram	Hiram, OH	W 34–0		
October 23	Mount Union	Buchtel Field; Akron, OH	L 3–13		
October 30	Baldwin–Wallace	Buchtel Field; Akron, OH	T 0–0		
November 6	Western Reserve	Buchtel Field; Akron, OH	W 7–6		
November 13	at Wooster	Wooster, OH	L 13–41		
November 20	Kenyon	Buchtel Field; Akron, OH	W 20–0		
*Non-conference game
