= 1931 Akron Zippers football team =

American college football season

1931 Akron Zippers football
- Conference: Ohio Athletic Conference
- Record: 1–7 (0–6 OAC)
- Head coach: Red Blair (5th season)
- Captain: William Schmittgen
- Home stadium: Buchtel Field

1931 Ohio Athletic Conference football standings
	Conf.					Overall
Team	W		L		T	W		L		T
Muskingum $	4	–	0	–	0	8	–	0	–	0
Western Reserve	3	–	0	–	0	3	–	5	–	1
Baldwin–Wallace	4	–	0	–	1	5	–	0	–	3
Otterbein	5	–	1	–	0	5	–	3	–	0
Mount Union	4	–	1	–	0	7	–	2	–	1
Ohio Northern	3	–	1	–	0	6	–	2	–	0
Case	4	–	1	–	1	4	–	3	–	1
Xavier	1	–	0	–	1	4	–	3	–	1
Heidelberg	2	–	1	–	0	3	–	4	–	0
Dayton	0	–	0	–	1	5	–	3	–	2
Kenyon	3	–	3	–	0	4	–	3	–	0
Oberlin	2	–	3	–	0	3	–	4	–	1
Wooster	2	–	4	–	0	4	–	5	–	0
Ashland	2	–	6	–	0	2	–	6	–	0
Capital	1	–	4	–	0	1	–	5	–	1
Marietta	1	–	4	–	0	1	–	7	–	0
Akron	0	–	6	–	0	1	–	7	–	0
Hiram	0	–	6	–	0	0	–	8	–	0
$ – Conference champion

The 1931 Akron Zippers football team was an American football team that represented the University of Akron in the Ohio Athletic Conference during the 1931 college football season. In its fifth season under head coach Red Blair, the team compiled a 1–7 record (0–6 in conference) and was outscored by a total of 114 to 39. William Schmittgen was the team captain.

== Schedule ==
Date	Opponent	Site	Result	Attendance	Source
October 10	Kent State*	Buchtel Field; Akron, OH (rivalry)	W 12–6		
October 17	Wooster	Buchtel Field; Akron, OH	L 7–25		
October 24	Case	Buchtel Field; Akron, OH	L 7–13		
October 31	Ashland	Buchtel Field; Akron, OH	L 7–13		
November 7	Oberlin	Oberlin, OH	L 0–6		
November 14	Ohio State reserves*	Buchtel Field; Akron, OH	L 0–25		
November 21	Baldwin–Wallace	Buchtel Field; Akron, OH	L 0–19		
November 26	Mount Union	Alliance, OH	L 6–7		
*Non-conference game
