= 1926 St. Xavier Musketeers football team =

American college football season

1926 St. Xavier Musketeers football
- Conference: Ohio Athletic Conference
- Record: 9–1 (1–0 OAC)
- Head coach: Joseph A. Meyer (7th season)
- Home stadium: Corcoran Field

1926 Ohio Athletic Conference football standings
	Conf.					Overall
Team	W		L		T	W		L		T
Muskingum $	7	–	0	–	0	9	–	0	–	0
Dayton	3	–	0	–	0	8	–	2	–	0
St. Xavier	1	–	0	–	0	9	–	1	–	0
Oberlin	6	–	1	–	0	6	–	1	–	0
Wittenberg	4	–	1	–	0	6	–	2	–	0
Ohio Wesleyan	5	–	1	–	1	6	–	2	–	1
Wooster	5	–	2	–	0	6	–	2	–	0
Miami (OH)	4	–	2	–	1	5	–	2	–	1
Ohio	4	–	2	–	1	5	–	2	–	1
Akron	4	–	2	–	2	5	–	2	–	2
Mount Union	5	–	3	–	0	6	–	3	–	0
Case	4	–	2	–	3	4	–	2	–	3
Baldwin–Wallace	3	–	3	–	2	3	–	3	–	2
Western Reserve	3	–	4	–	1	3	–	4	–	1
Heidelberg	2	–	4	–	0	3	–	4	–	0
Cincinnati	2	–	5	–	1	3	–	5	–	1
Denison	2	–	6	–	0	2	–	6	–	1
Otterbein	1	–	5	–	0	2	–	5	–	0
Ohio Northern	1	–	6	–	0	1	–	6	–	0
Kenyon	1	–	6	–	0	1	–	7	–	0
Marietta	1	–	6	–	0	1	–	7	–	0
Hiram	0	–	7	–	0	0	–	7	–	0
$ – Conference champion

The 1926 St. Xavier Musketeers football team was an American football team that represented St. Xavier College (later renamed Xavier University) in the Ohio Athletic Conference (OAC) during the 1926 college football season. In its seventh season under head coach Joseph A. Meyer, the team compiled a 9–1 record (1–0 against OAC opponents) and outscored opponents by a total of 348 to 64. After winning its first nine games, the team's lost on Thanksgiving Day to the undefeated 1926 Haskell Indians football team that led the country in scoring. The team played its home games at Corcoran Field in Cincinnati.

== Schedule ==
Date	Opponent	Site	Result	Attendance	Source
September 25	Cedarville (OH)*	Corcoran Field; Cincinnati, OH	W 54–0		
October 2	Transylvania*	Corcoran Field; Cincinnati, OH	W 56–0		
October 9	Quantico Marines*	Corcoran Field; Cincinnati, OH	W 27–11		
October 16	Louisville*	Corcoran Field; Cincinnati, OH	W 20–7		
October 23	Kenyon	Corcoran Field; Cincinnati, OH	W 33–0		
October 30	Marshall*	Corcoran Field; Cincinnati, OH	W 20–6		
November 6	Toledo*	Corcoran Field; Cincinnati, OH	W 69–6		
November 13	Murray State*	Corcoran Field; Cincinnati, OH	W 48–0		
November 20	West Virginia Wesleyan*	Corcoran Field; Cincinnati, OH	W 21–7		
November 25	Haskell*	Corcoran Field; Cincinnati, OH	L 0–27	12,000	
*Non-conference game
