= 1926 Muskingum Fighting Muskies football team =

American college football season

1926 Muskingum Fighting Muskies football

OAC champion
- Conference: Ohio Athletic Conference
- Record: 9–0 (7–0 OAC)
- Head coach: Bill Lange (4th season)

1926 Ohio Athletic Conference football standings
	Conf.					Overall
Team	W		L		T	W		L		T
Muskingum $	7	–	0	–	0	9	–	0	–	0
Dayton	3	–	0	–	0	8	–	2	–	0
St. Xavier	1	–	0	–	0	9	–	1	–	0
Oberlin	6	–	1	–	0	6	–	1	–	0
Wittenberg	4	–	1	–	0	6	–	2	–	0
Ohio Wesleyan	5	–	1	–	1	6	–	2	–	1
Wooster	5	–	2	–	0	6	–	2	–	0
Miami (OH)	4	–	2	–	1	5	–	2	–	1
Ohio	4	–	2	–	1	5	–	2	–	1
Akron	4	–	2	–	2	5	–	2	–	2
Mount Union	5	–	3	–	0	6	–	3	–	0
Case	4	–	2	–	3	4	–	2	–	3
Baldwin–Wallace	3	–	3	–	2	3	–	3	–	2
Western Reserve	3	–	4	–	1	3	–	4	–	1
Heidelberg	2	–	4	–	0	3	–	4	–	0
Cincinnati	2	–	5	–	1	3	–	5	–	1
Denison	2	–	6	–	0	2	–	6	–	1
Otterbein	1	–	5	–	0	2	–	5	–	0
Ohio Northern	1	–	6	–	0	1	–	6	–	0
Kenyon	1	–	6	–	0	1	–	7	–	0
Marietta	1	–	6	–	0	1	–	7	–	0
Hiram	0	–	7	–	0	0	–	7	–	0
$ – Conference champion

The 1926 Muskingum Fighting Muskies football team was an American football team that represented Muskingum University of New Concord, Ohio, as a member of the Ohio Athletic Conference (OAC) during the 1926 college football season. In their fourth season under head coach Bill Lange, the Fighting Muskies compiled a perfect 9–0 record (7–0 against OAC opponents), won the OAC championship, and outscored opponents by a total of 178 to 68.

The 1926 season was the first perfect season in Muskingum football history. Additional perfect seasons followed in 1931, 1955, and 1960.

== Schedule ==
Date	Opponent	Site	Result	Attendance	Source
September 25	Ashland*	New Concord, OH	W 6–0		
October 2	at Hiram	Hiram, OH	W 19–0		
October 8	at Capital*	Columbus, OH	W 28–7		
October 16	at Ohio Northern	Ada, OH	W 6–0		
October 23	Heidelberg	New Concord, OH	W 19–8		
October 30	at Otterbein	Westerville, OH	W 12–0		
November 6	Kenyon	New Concord, OH	W 39–34		
November 12	Denison	New Concord, OH	W 22–13		
November 20	Marietta^{†}	New Concord, OH	W 27–6		
*Non-conference game; ^{†}Homecoming
