= Luke Barker (American football) =

American football coach (born c. 1991)

Current position
- Title: Head coach
- Team: Fairmont State
- Conference: MEC
- Record: 13–9

Biographical details
- Born: c. 1991 (age 34–35); Cincinnati, Ohio, U.S.
- Education: University of Charleston (2012)

Playing career
- 2009–2011: Charleston (WV)

Coaching career (HC unless noted)
- 2012: Charleston (WV) (OA)
- 2013–2014: West Virginia Wesleyan (RB/TE)
- 2015–2017: IUP (RB/TE)
- 2018–2020: IUP (AHC/RB/TE)
- 2021: Charleston (WV) (OL)
- 2022–2023: Charleston (WV) (OC/OL)
- 2024–present: Fairmont State

Head coaching record
- Overall: 13–9

Luke Barker (born c. 1991) is an American college football coach. He is the head football coach for Fairmont State University, a position he has held since 2024. He also coached for Charleston (WV), West Virginia Wesleyan, and IUP. He played college football for Charleston (WV).

== Head coaching record ==
Year	Team	Overall	Conference	Standing	Bowl/playoffs
Fairmont State Fighting Falcons (Mountain East Conference) (2024–present)
2024	Fairmont State	7–4	6–3	T–3rd	
2025	Fairmont State	6–5	3–5	T–6th	
Fairmont State:		13–9	9–8		
Total:		13–9			
