= 1926 Miami Redskins football team =

American college football season

1926 Miami Redskins football
- Conference: Buckeye Athletic Association, Ohio Athletic Conference
- Record: 5–2–1 (1–2–1 BAA, 4–2–1 OAC)
- Head coach: Chester Pittser (3rd season)
- Home stadium: Miami Field

1926 Buckeye Athletic Association football standings
	Conf.					Overall
Team	W		L		T	W		L		T
Ohio Wesleyan $	3	–	0	–	1	6	–	2	–	1
Wittenberg	3	–	1	–	0	6	–	2	–	0
Ohio	2	–	1	–	1	5	–	2	–	1
Miami (OH)	1	–	2	–	1	5	–	2	–	1
Denison	1	–	3	–	0	2	–	6	–	1
Cincinnati	0	–	3	–	1	3	–	5	–	1
$ – Conference champion

1926 Ohio Athletic Conference football standings
	Conf.					Overall
Team	W		L		T	W		L		T
Muskingum $	7	–	0	–	0	9	–	0	–	0
Dayton	3	–	0	–	0	8	–	2	–	0
St. Xavier	1	–	0	–	0	9	–	1	–	0
Oberlin	6	–	1	–	0	6	–	1	–	0
Wittenberg	4	–	1	–	0	6	–	2	–	0
Ohio Wesleyan	5	–	1	–	1	6	–	2	–	1
Wooster	5	–	2	–	0	6	–	2	–	0
Miami (OH)	4	–	2	–	1	5	–	2	–	1
Ohio	4	–	2	–	1	5	–	2	–	1
Akron	4	–	2	–	2	5	–	2	–	2
Mount Union	5	–	3	–	0	6	–	3	–	0
Case	4	–	2	–	3	4	–	2	–	3
Baldwin–Wallace	3	–	3	–	2	3	–	3	–	2
Western Reserve	3	–	4	–	1	3	–	4	–	1
Heidelberg	2	–	4	–	0	3	–	4	–	0
Cincinnati	2	–	5	–	1	3	–	5	–	1
Denison	2	–	6	–	0	2	–	6	–	1
Otterbein	1	–	5	–	0	2	–	5	–	0
Ohio Northern	1	–	6	–	0	1	–	6	–	0
Kenyon	1	–	6	–	0	1	–	7	–	0
Marietta	1	–	6	–	0	1	–	7	–	0
Hiram	0	–	7	–	0	0	–	7	–	0
$ – Conference champion

The 1926 Miami Redskins football team was an American football team that represented Miami University of Oxford, Ohio, as a member of the Buckeye Athletic Association (BAA) and the Ohio Athletic Conference (OAC) during the 1926 college football season. In their third season under head coach Chester Pittser, the Redskins compiled a 5–2–1 record (1–2–1 in conference games), finished in fourth place out of six teams in the BAA, and outscored opponents by a total of 112 to 58.

== Schedule ==
Date	Opponent	Site	Result	Attendance	Source
September 26	Wilmington*	Miami Field; Oxford, OH	W 9–0		
October 2	Ohio Wesleyan	Miami Field; Oxford, OH	L 7–14		
October 9	Ohio Northern	Miami Field; Oxford, OH	W 34–12		
October 16	at Wittenberg	Springfield, OH	L 0–7		
October 30	vs. Denison	University of Dayton Stadium; Dayton, OH	W 16–0		
November 6	Mount Union	Ohio Field; Oxford, OH	W 27–19		
November 13	at Oberlin	Oberlin, OH	W 13–0		
November 25	at Cincinnati	Carson Field; Cincinnati, OH (Victory Bell)	T 6–6		
*Non-conference game
