= Eastern Carolina Baseball Association =

Former minor baseball league

The Eastern Carolina Baseball Association was a six-team minor league baseball affiliation that operated in the Eastern part of North Carolina. The league was considered to be an "outlaw" league since it existed outside of the law of the National Association.

The association lasted three seasons (1920-1922). Members included Washington, New Bern, Kinston, Greenville, Tarboro, and Farmville.

Although, as an outlaw league, it was on the lowest rung of professional baseball, the circuit did produce some athletes of note including George Suggs, Pat Crawford, and College Football Hall of Fame member Ira Rodgers.
