= 1926 Ohio Bobcats football team =

American college football season

1926 Ohio Bobcats football
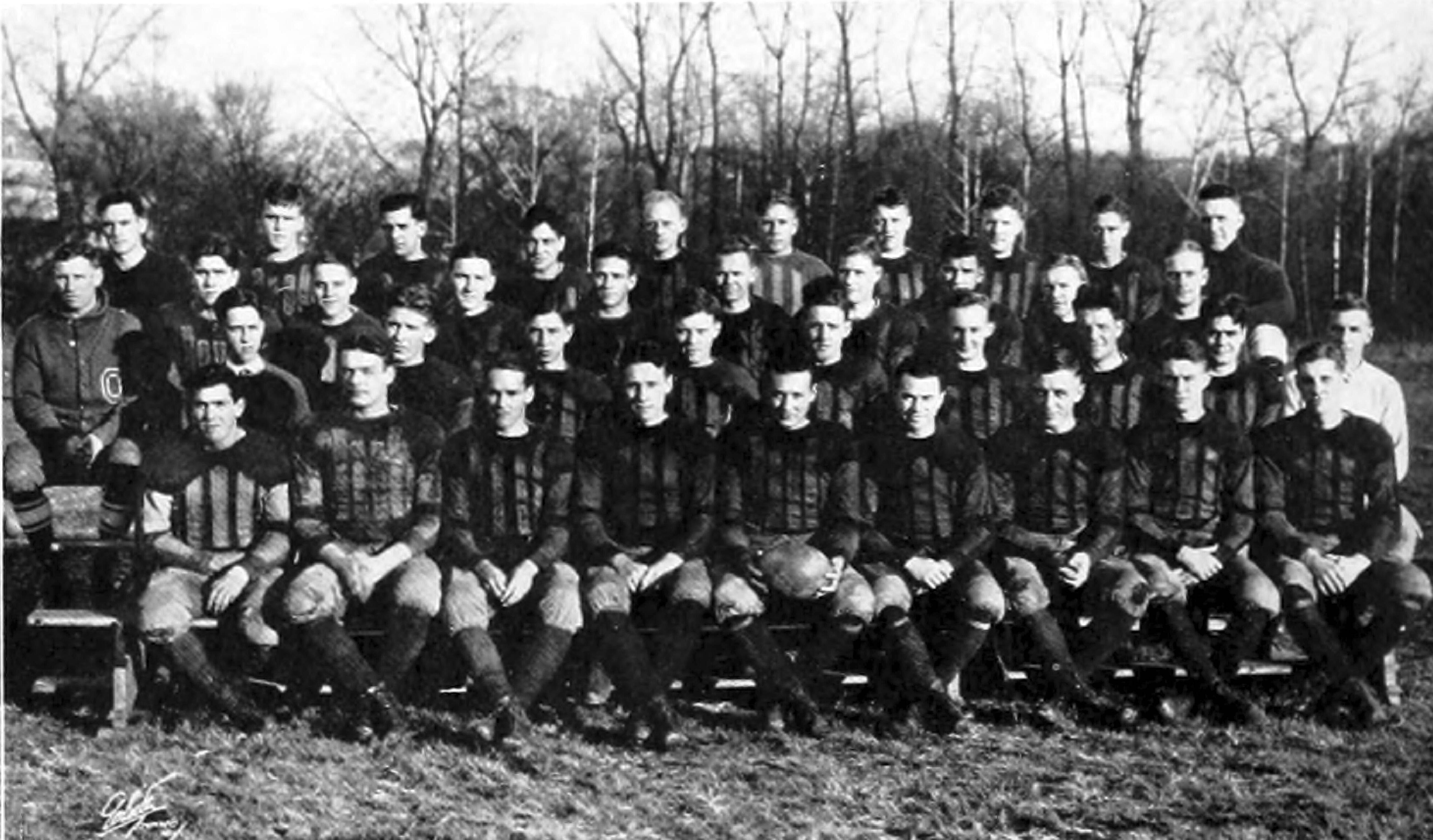
- Conference: Buckeye Athletic Association, Ohio Athletic Conference
- Record: 5–2–1 (2–1–1 BAA, 4–2–1 OAC)
- Head coach: Don Peden (3rd season)

1926 Buckeye Athletic Association football standings
	Conf.					Overall
Team	W		L		T	W		L		T
Ohio Wesleyan $	3	–	0	–	1	6	–	2	–	1
Wittenberg	3	–	1	–	0	6	–	2	–	0
Ohio	2	–	1	–	1	5	–	2	–	1
Miami (OH)	1	–	2	–	1	5	–	2	–	1
Denison	1	–	3	–	0	2	–	6	–	1
Cincinnati	0	–	3	–	1	3	–	5	–	1
$ – Conference champion

1926 Ohio Athletic Conference football standings
	Conf.					Overall
Team	W		L		T	W		L		T
Muskingum $	7	–	0	–	0	9	–	0	–	0
Dayton	3	–	0	–	0	8	–	2	–	0
St. Xavier	1	–	0	–	0	9	–	1	–	0
Oberlin	6	–	1	–	0	6	–	1	–	0
Wittenberg	4	–	1	–	0	6	–	2	–	0
Ohio Wesleyan	5	–	1	–	1	6	–	2	–	1
Wooster	5	–	2	–	0	6	–	2	–	0
Miami (OH)	4	–	2	–	1	5	–	2	–	1
Ohio	4	–	2	–	1	5	–	2	–	1
Akron	4	–	2	–	2	5	–	2	–	2
Mount Union	5	–	3	–	0	6	–	3	–	0
Case	4	–	2	–	3	4	–	2	–	3
Baldwin–Wallace	3	–	3	–	2	3	–	3	–	2
Western Reserve	3	–	4	–	1	3	–	4	–	1
Heidelberg	2	–	4	–	0	3	–	4	–	0
Cincinnati	2	–	5	–	1	3	–	5	–	1
Denison	2	–	6	–	0	2	–	6	–	1
Otterbein	1	–	5	–	0	2	–	5	–	0
Ohio Northern	1	–	6	–	0	1	–	6	–	0
Kenyon	1	–	6	–	0	1	–	7	–	0
Marietta	1	–	6	–	0	1	–	7	–	0
Hiram	0	–	7	–	0	0	–	7	–	0
$ – Conference champion

The 1926 Ohio Bobcats football team was an American football team that represented Ohio University in the Buckeye Athletic Association ( BAA) and the Ohio Athletic Conference (OAC) during the 1926 college football season. In their third season under head coach Don Peden, the Bobcats compiled a 5–2–1 record and outscored opponents by a total of 111 to 17.

== Schedule ==
Date	Opponent	Site	Result	Attendance	Source
October 3	Rio Grande	Ohio Field; Athens, OH	W 40–0		
October 9	at Akron	Buchtel Field; Akron, OH	L 0–3	3,000	
October 16	Denison	Ohio Field; Athens, OH	W 6–0		
October 23	Cincinnati	Ohio Field; Athens, OH	W 38–7		
October 30	at Ohio Wesleyan	Delaware, OH	T 0–0		
November 6	Ohio Northern	Ohio Field; Athens, OH	W 9–0		
November 12	at Marietta	Marietta, OH	W 12–0		
November 20	at Wittenberg	Springfield, OH	L 6–7		
