= 1931 Xavier Musketeers football team =

American college football season

1931 Xavier Musketeers football
- Conference: Ohio Athletic Conference
- Record: 4–3–1 (1–0–1 OAC)
- Head coach: Joseph A. Meyer (12th season)
- Home stadium: Corcoran Field

1931 Ohio Athletic Conference football standings
	Conf.					Overall
Team	W		L		T	W		L		T
Muskingum $	4	–	0	–	0	8	–	0	–	0
Western Reserve	3	–	0	–	0	3	–	5	–	1
Baldwin–Wallace	4	–	0	–	1	5	–	0	–	3
Otterbein	5	–	1	–	0	5	–	3	–	0
Mount Union	4	–	1	–	0	7	–	2	–	1
Ohio Northern	3	–	1	–	0	6	–	2	–	0
Case	4	–	1	–	1	4	–	3	–	1
Xavier	1	–	0	–	1	4	–	3	–	1
Heidelberg	2	–	1	–	0	3	–	4	–	0
Dayton	0	–	0	–	1	5	–	3	–	2
Kenyon	3	–	3	–	0	4	–	3	–	0
Oberlin	2	–	3	–	0	3	–	4	–	1
Wooster	2	–	4	–	0	4	–	5	–	0
Ashland	2	–	6	–	0	2	–	6	–	0
Capital	1	–	4	–	0	1	–	5	–	1
Marietta	1	–	4	–	0	1	–	7	–	0
Akron	0	–	6	–	0	1	–	7	–	0
Hiram	0	–	6	–	0	0	–	8	–	0
$ – Conference champion

The 1931 Xavier Musketeers football team was an American football team that represented Xavier University as a member of the Ohio Athletic Conference (OAC) during the 1931 college football season. In its 12th season under head coach Joseph A. Meyer, the team compiled a 4–3–1 record (1–0–1 against OAC opponents) and outscored all opponents by a total of 107 to 38.

== Schedule ==
Date	Opponent	Site	Result	Attendance	Source
September 25	Transylvania*	Corcoran Field; Cincinnati, OH	W 24–0	3,000	
October 2	Kenyon	Corcoran Field; Cincinnati, OH	W 41–0	14,017	
October 9	Georgetown (KY)*	Corcoran Field; Cincinnati, OH	W 14–0		
October 16	Centre*	Corcoran Field; Cincinnati, OH	L 0–6		
October 23	at Wittenberg*	Springfield, OH	L 7–12		
November 7	Dayton	Corcoran Field; Cincinnati, OH	T 7–7	10,000	
November 13	Loyola (LA)*	Corcoran Field; Cincinnati, OH	L 2–7		
November 26	Haskell*	Corcoran Field; Cincinnati, OH	W 12–6	15,805	
*Non-conference game
