= Bill Lange (coach) =

American football and basketball player and coach (1897–1953)

- Lange pictured in Yackety Yack 1943, North Carolina yearbook

Biographical details
- Born: February 16, 1897; Cleveland, Ohio, U.S.
- Died: June 22, 1953 (aged 56); Wadsworth, Ohio, U.S.

Playing career

Football
- c. 1920: Wittenberg

Basketball
- c. 1920: Wittenberg
- Position: Tackle (football)

Coaching career (HC unless noted)

Football
- 1923–1935: Muskingum
- 1936–1943: North Carolina (assistant)
- 1944: Kenyon

Basketball
- 1923–1936: Muskingum
- 1939–1944: North Carolina
- 1944–1945: Kenyon

Administrative career (AD unless noted)
- 1923–1936: Muskingum
- 1944–1945: Kenyon

Head coaching record
- Overall: 71–35–6 (football); 219–144 (basketball)

Accomplishments and honors

Championships
- Football; 5 OAC (1926–1927, 1929–1931) Basketball; 3 OAC regular season (1926–1928); 2 SoCon regular season (1941, 1944); 1 SoCon tournament (1940)

William Fisher Lange (February 16, 1897 – June 22, 1953) was an American basketball and football player and coach. He played college football and basketball for Wittenberg College from 1918 to 1921. During the 1922–23 season, he coached the Cleveland Rosenblums, an early professional basketball team that was known at the time as "the fastest basket ball aggregation in this part of the country." From 1923 to 1936, he was the athletic director and head football and basketball coach at Muskingum College in Ohio. He was best known for being the head coach of the North Carolina Tar Heels men's basketball team from 1939 through 1944.

== Early years ==
Lange was born in Cleveland, Ohio in 1897 and raised in Huron, Ohio. At the time of the 1910 United States census in April 1910, Lange was living on a farm in Berlin Township, Erie County, Ohio, with his uncle, Adam Fisher, his mother, Mary Lange, and his younger sisters, Hilda and Murnice Lange.

Lange attended Huron High School where he starred on the basketball and football teams. In June 1918, Lange was employed by the Cleveland Stevedore Co. in Huron, Ohio. Lange joined the U.S. Naval Reserves in July 1918 and was called to active duty in November 1918. He served 108 days of active duty and attained the rank of seaman second class. At the time of the 1920 United States census, Lange was living in Huron, Ohio, with his mother, Mary Lange, and his younger sister, Murnice Lange. He received his honorable discharge from the Naval Reserves in September 1921.

== Wittenberg College ==
Lange subsequently enrolled at Wittenberg College in Springfield, Ohio. He played college football as a tackle on Wittenberg football teams that went undefeated for consecutive seasons in 1919 and 1920. His football coach at Wittenberg was Ernie Godfrey, who later served as a longtime assistant coach for the Ohio State Buckeyes football team and was inducted into the College Football Hall of Fame in 1972. Lange also played on Wittenberg's basketball team and was selected to the All-Ohio team in both sports. He graduated from Wittenberg in 1921.

== Coaching career ==
=== High school coach ===
After graduating from Wittenberg, Lange coached high school sports at London, Ohio. During the 1922–23 academic year, he was a coach at West Tech High School in Cleveland.

=== Cleveland Rosenblums ===
While coaching high school basketball in Cleveland, Lange also coached the Cleveland Rosenblums. The Rosenblums were an early professional basketball team that was known in 1923 as "the fastest basket ball aggregation in this part of the country." The Rosenblums later became one of the founding members of the American Basketball League in 1925. Some sources indicate that Lange also played for the team.

=== Muskingum College ===
In September 1923, he was hired as the athletic director and head coach at Muskingum College in New Concord, Ohio. Upon his hiring, one Ohio newspaper reported: "Lange is a young man of splendid character and has the initiative and ambition together with an attractive personality that make for success as an athletic director and coach." He remained at Muskingum for 13 years until 1936. As the school's head football coach from 1923 to 1935, Lange led the school to an overall record of 71–32–6. He is the third winningest coach in the history of Muskingum's football program. As Muskingum's basketball coach, he compiled a record of 133–94. He also served as the school's athletic director for several years. During the 1925–26 and 1926–27 season, Lange led the Muskingum men's basketball team to records of 17–2 and 19–2. His 1927 Muskingum men's basketball team won the Ohio Conference championship. Lange was instrumental in the construction of McConagha Stadium and a student gymnasium at Muskingum. One Ohio newspaper noted that Lange turned Muskingum into a consistent winner despite several obstacles: "Lange formed winning basketball and football teams despite numerous handicaps. With material never outstanding, Lange put together winning combinations year in and year out."

At the time of the 1930 United States census, Lange was living in Union Township, Muskingum County, Ohio, with his wife Juliet Rive Lange and their daughter Harriet S. Lange.

=== University of North Carolina ===
In July 1936, Lange left Muskingum to accept a position at the University of North Carolina at Chapel Hill as the Tar Heels football team's backfield coach and as an assistant professor of physical education. As an assistant coach on the football team, he worked under head coaches Raymond Wolf (1936–1941), Jim Tatum (1942), and Tom Young (1943). He became the head coach of the North Carolina Tar Heels men's basketball team in 1939. In 1940–41, Lange guided the Tar Heels to the school's first ever NCAA tournament appearance. They lost to Pittsburgh 26–20 in the first round. Also during Lange's time coaching North Carolina, George Glamack became a star player and earned a national player of the year honor.

=== Kenyon College ===
In 1944, Lange left North Carolina to become the athletic director for Kenyon College in Gambier, Ohio. Lange also served as Kenyon's head football and basketball coach during the 1944–1945 school year. In his lone season as the basketball coach, the Kenyon Lords compiled one win—a 30–29 away game defeat of Kent State.

== Later years and honors ==
Lange retired from coaching in 1945 and moved to Florida. He lived in Englewood, Florida, and worked as a commission merchant dealing in citrus fruit. He later moved to Leesburg, Florida where he operated a tourist court for three years. In June 1953, he died at age 56 while visiting friends in Wadsworth, Ohio.

In 1980, Lange was selected as one of the inaugural inductees into the Muskingum University Athletic Hall of Fame. He was also inducted into the Wittenberg University Athletic Hall of Fame in 1987.

== Head coaching record ==
=== Football ===
Year	Team	Overall	Conference	Standing	Bowl/playoffs
Muskingum Fighting Muskies (Ohio Athletic Conference) (1923–1935)
1922	Muskingum	5–3	3–3	T–8th	
1924	Muskingum	2–6	2–5	T–15th	
1925	Muskingum	4–3–1	3–3	10th	
1926	Muskingum	9–0	7–0	1st	
1927	Muskingum	8–1	7–1	T–1st	
1928	Muskingum	4–4–1	4–2–1	3rd	
1929	Muskingum	6–2	5–0	1st	
1930	Muskingum	6–1–1	3–0–1	1st	
1931	Muskingum	8–0	4–0	1st	
1932	Muskingum	4–3–1	3–1–1	7th	
1933	Muskingum	5–2–1	4–2–1	T–5th	
1934	Muskingum	5–3–1	4–2–1	8th	
1935	Muskingum	5–4	4–3	8th	
Muskingum:		71–32–6	52–22–5		
Kenyon Lords (Ohio Athletic Conference) (1944)
1944	Kenyon	0–3	NA	NA	
Kenyon:		0–3			
Total:		71–35–6			
National championship Conference title Conference division title or championship game berth

=== Basketball ===
Record table
Season	Team	Overall	Conference	Standing	Postseason
Muskingum Fighting Muskies (Ohio Athletic Conference) (1923–1936)
1923–24	Muskingum	6–11	2–11	18th	
1924–25	Muskingum	3–11	1–8	18th	
1925–26	Muskingum	17–2	9–0	T–1st	
1926–27	Muskingum	19–2	11–0	1st	
1927–28	Muskingum	13–7	8–1	1st	
1928–29	Muskingum	9–10	7–3	T–4th	
1929–30	Muskingum	7–9	7–4	4th	
1930–31	Muskingum	14–6	11–3	3rd	
1931–32	Muskingum	10–9	6–8	10th	
1932–33	Muskingum	6–9	5–6	9th	
1933–34	Muskingum	5–8	5–8	T–12th	
1934–35	Muskingum	13–3	12–3	T–2nd	
1935–36	Muskingum	11–7	9–6	9th	
Muskingum:		133–94	93–61		
North Carolina Tar Heels (Southern Conference) (1939–1944)
1939–40	North Carolina	23–3	11–2	2nd	
1940–41	North Carolina	19–9	14–1	1st	NCAA Regional Fourth Place
1941–42	North Carolina	14–9	9–5	7th	
1942–43	North Carolina	12–10	8–9	11th	
1943–44	North Carolina	17–10	9–1	1st	
North Carolina:		85–41	51–18		
Kenyon Lords (Ohio Athletic Conference) (1944–1945)
1944–45	Kenyon	1–9	1–9	12th	
Kenyon:		1–9	1–9		
Total:		219–144			
National champion Postseason invitational champion Conference regular season champion Conference regular season and conference tournament champion Division regular season champion Division regular season and conference tournament champion Conference tournament champion
