= Pat Crawford (baseball) =

American baseball player (1902–1994)

- Second baseman
- Born: January 28, 1902; Society Hill, South Carolina, U.S.
- Died: January 25, 1994 (aged 91); Morehead City, North Carolina, U.S.
- Batted: Left Threw: Right

MLB debut
- April 18, 1929, for the New York Giants

Last MLB appearance
- September 27, 1934, for the St. Louis Cardinals

MLB statistics
- Batting average: .280
- Home runs: 9
- Runs batted in: 104
- Stats at Baseball Reference

Teams
- New York Giants (1929–1930); Cincinnati Reds (1930); St. Louis Cardinals (1933–1934)

Clifford Rankin Crawford (January 28, 1902 – January 25, 1994), nicknamed "Captain Pat", was an American Major League Baseball player. A second baseman, he was part of the 1934 St. Louis Cardinals World Series team.

== Early life ==
He graduated from Sumter High School, class of 1919. Crawford graduated from Davidson College, and received his master's degree from Ohio State University.

== Career ==
=== Minor leagues ===
He played baseball for several semi-pro and minor league teams throughout the 1920s including a stint as the left fielder for the 1922 Kinston Highwaymen in the Eastern Carolina Baseball Association, an independent or "outlaw league" team not affiliated with the National Association.

=== Major League ===
Crawford got his big break in 1929 when he made it to the majors with the New York Giants, which were still being managed by the Hall of Famer John McGraw. On May 26, 1929, Crawford hit a pinch-hit grand slam off Socks Seibold in the sixth inning. Les Bell then hit a seventh-inning pinch-hit grand slam off Carl Hubbell. This was the only time in history that two pinch-hit grand slams were hit in the same game. In 1931 and 1932, he had over 237 and 236 hits respectively for minor league Columbus, Ohio. He went in and out of the majors through the 1934 season and was named league MVP of the American Association while playing for the Columbus Senators in 1932.

In 1934, Crawford found himself playing on the world champion St. Louis Cardinals. The last two games of his major league career were World Series games. His teammates on the Gashouse Gang that year included HOFers Frankie Frisch, Leo Durocher, Joe Medwick, Dizzy Dean, and Burleigh Grimes.

All told, Crawford had a .280 batting average with 9 home runs and 104 RBI in 318 major league games. He was one of the initial inductees in the Kinston Professional Baseball Hall of Fame on February 11, 1983.

== Death ==
Crawford died on January 25, 1994, in Morehead City, North Carolina, three days shy of what would have been his 92nd birthday. He was the last surviving member of the 1934 World Champion St. Louis Cardinals.
