= 1926 Cincinnati Bearcats football team =

American college football season

1926 Cincinnati Bearcats football
- Conference: Buckeye Athletic Association, Ohio Athletic Conference
- Record: 3–5–1 (0–3–1 BAA, 2–5–1 OAC)
- Head coach: George McLaren (5th season)
- Captain: Tiny Hermann
- Home stadium: Nippert Stadium

1926 Buckeye Athletic Association football standings
	Conf.					Overall
Team	W		L		T	W		L		T
Ohio Wesleyan $	3	–	0	–	1	6	–	2	–	1
Wittenberg	3	–	1	–	0	6	–	2	–	0
Ohio	2	–	1	–	1	5	–	2	–	1
Miami (OH)	1	–	2	–	1	5	–	2	–	1
Denison	1	–	3	–	0	2	–	6	–	1
Cincinnati	0	–	3	–	1	3	–	5	–	1
$ – Conference champion

1926 Ohio Athletic Conference football standings
	Conf.					Overall
Team	W		L		T	W		L		T
Muskingum $	7	–	0	–	0	9	–	0	–	0
Dayton	3	–	0	–	0	8	–	2	–	0
St. Xavier	1	–	0	–	0	9	–	1	–	0
Oberlin	6	–	1	–	0	6	–	1	–	0
Wittenberg	4	–	1	–	0	6	–	2	–	0
Ohio Wesleyan	5	–	1	–	1	6	–	2	–	1
Wooster	5	–	2	–	0	6	–	2	–	0
Miami (OH)	4	–	2	–	1	5	–	2	–	1
Ohio	4	–	2	–	1	5	–	2	–	1
Akron	4	–	2	–	2	5	–	2	–	2
Mount Union	5	–	3	–	0	6	–	3	–	0
Case	4	–	2	–	3	4	–	2	–	3
Baldwin–Wallace	3	–	3	–	2	3	–	3	–	2
Western Reserve	3	–	4	–	1	3	–	4	–	1
Heidelberg	2	–	4	–	0	3	–	4	–	0
Cincinnati	2	–	5	–	1	3	–	5	–	1
Denison	2	–	6	–	0	2	–	6	–	1
Otterbein	1	–	5	–	0	2	–	5	–	0
Ohio Northern	1	–	6	–	0	1	–	6	–	0
Kenyon	1	–	6	–	0	1	–	7	–	0
Marietta	1	–	6	–	0	1	–	7	–	0
Hiram	0	–	7	–	0	0	–	7	–	0
$ – Conference champion

The 1926 Cincinnati Bearcats football team was an American football team that represented the University of Cincinnati as a member of the Buckeye Athletic Association (BAA) and the Ohio Athletic Conference (OAC) during the 1926 college football season. In their fifth and final season under head coach George McLaren, the Bearcats compiled a 3–5–1 record.>

== Schedule ==
Date	Opponent	Site	Result	Attendance	Source
September 25	Kentucky Wesleyan*	Nippert Stadium; Cincinnati, OH	W 25–0		
October 2	Otterbein*	Nippert Stadium; Cincinnati, OH	W 21–6		
October 9	at Denison	Granville, OH	L 0–14		
October 16	Marietta	Nippert Stadium; Cincinnati, OH	W 22–7		
October 23	at Ohio	Ohio Field; Athens, OH	L 7-38		
October 30	at Western Reserve	Cleveland, OH	L 2–14		
November 6	Dayton	Nippert Stadium; Cincinnati, OH	L 0–52	8,000	
November 13	Wittenberg	Nippert Stadium; Cincinnati, OH	L 13–15		
November 25	Miami (OH)	Nippert Stadium; Cincinnati, OH (Victory Bell)	T 6–6		
*Non-conference game
