= Pearl Rardin =

American football coach (1886–1968)

Biographical details
- Born: March 27, 1886; Catlettsburg, Kentucky, U.S.
- Died: August 11, 1968 (aged 82)

Coaching career (HC unless noted)
- 1906–1907: Marshall

Head coaching record
- Overall: 7–2–2

Pearl B. Rardin (March 27, 1886 – August 11, 1968) was an American college football coach and World War I service member. He served as the head football coach at Marshall College in Huntington, West Virginia from 1906 to 1907, compiling a record of 7–2–2.

Rardin was an officer at Fort Benjamin Harrison during World War I.

== Head coaching record ==
Year	Team	Overall	Conference	Standing	Bowl/playoffs
Marshall Thundering Herd (Independent) (1906–1907)
1906	Marshall	4–0–1			
1907	Marshall	3–2–1			
Marshall:		7–2–2			
Total:		7–2–2			
