= 1907 Marshall Thundering Herd football team =

American college football season

1907 Marshall Thundering Herd football
- Conference: Independent
- Record: 3–2–1
- Head coach: Pearl Rardin (2nd season)
- Captain: T. J. Robinson
- Home stadium: Central Field

1907 Southern college football independents records
	Conf.			Overall
Team	W	L	T	W		L		T
South Carolina		–		3	–	0	–	0
Stetson		–		2	–	0	–	0
Southwestern Louisiana Industrial		–		1	–	0	–	0
Mississippi College		–		1	–	0	–	0
North Carolina A&M		–		6	–	0	–	1
Louisiana Industrial		–		9	–	1	–	0
Kentucky State		–		9	–	1	–	1
Texas		–		6	–	1	–	1
Texas A&M		–		6	–	1	–	1
Davidson		–		4	–	1	–	1
Florida		–		4	–	1	–	1
Navy		–		9	–	2	–	1
VPI		–		7	–	2	–	0
Virginia		–		6	–	3	–	1
TCU		–		4	–	2	–	2
West Virginia		–		6	–	4	–	0
VMI		–		5	–	3	–	0
Tulane		–		3	–	2	–	0
Oklahoma		–		4	–	4	–	0
North Carolina		–		4	–	4	–	1
Baylor		–		4	–	3	–	1
Arkansas		–		4	–	4	–	1
Maryland		–		3	–	5	–	0
George Washington		–		2	–	4	–	1
The Citadel		–		2	–	4	–	1
Georgetown		–		2	–	4	–	1
Oklahoma A&M		–		1	–	5	–	2
Birmingham		–		1	–	3	–	0
Chattanooga		–		0	–	5	–	1
Delaware		–		0	–	5	–	1
Catholic University		–		0	–	1	–	0
Louisiana Normal		–		0	–	1	–	0
South Carolina State		–		0	–	1	–	0
Spring Hill		–		0	–	1	–	0

The 1907 Marshall Thundering Herd football team represented Marshall College (now Marshall University) as an independent during the 1907 college football season. Marshall posted a 3–2–1 record, outscoring its opposition 38–35. Home games were played on a campus field called "Central Field" which is presently Campus Commons.

== Schedule ==
Date	Opponent	Site	Result
October 12	Ashland YMCA	Central Field; Huntington, WV	T 0–0
October 19	at Georgetown (KY)	Georgetown, KY	W 11–5
November 2	Mountain State College	Central Field; Huntington, WV	W 22–0
November 9	vs. West Virginia Wesleyan	Ravenswood, WV	L 0–18
November 16	Charleston Athletic Club	Central Field; Huntington, WV	L 0–12
November 28	Morris Harvey^{†}	Central Field; Huntington, WV	W 5–0
^{†}Homecoming
