= Charles Tallman =

American athlete, coach and politician (1899–1973)

- Tallman pictured in The Monticola 1934, West Virginia yearbook

Biographical details
- Born: September 18, 1899; Tariff, West Virginia, U.S.
- Died: November 16, 1973 (aged 74); Augusta, Georgia, U.S.

Playing career

Football
- 1920–1923: West Virginia
- Position: End

Coaching career (HC unless noted)

Football
- 1924: West Virginia (assistant)
- 1925–1928: Marshall
- 1929–1933: West Virginia (freshmen)
- 1934–1936: West Virginia

Basketball
- 1925–1926: Marshall

Head coaching record
- Overall: 37–21–9 (football); 10–7 (basketball)

Accomplishments and honors

Championships
- Football; 2 WVIAC (1925, 1928)

Awards
- Second-team All-American (1923)

Charles Cameron "Trusty" Tallman (September 18, 1899 – November 16, 1973) was an American football player football coach, basketball coach, and law enforcement officer. "Trusty" was the only person in West Virginia sports history who was player, assistant coach and head football coach of both Marshall University and West Virginia University. Trusty was honorable mention End on Walter Camp's 1922 All-American football team, and was a member of the 1st undefeated West Virginia University team (1922). Tallman is one of the pre 1930's West Virginia football greats. He was captain of the West Virginia University baseball team, and as pitcher, set a school record. He was also president of Sigma Nu fraternity. He received a law degree from West Virginia University. He received his nickname "Trusty", when he was the only player who showed up for football practice at WVU, when it was raining. Coach Spears stated "Tallman is the only trust worthy one of you". He played professional football. He served as the head football coach at Marshall University from 1925 to 1928 and at West Virginia University from 1934 to 1936, compiling a career college football record of 37–21–9. "Trusty" arranged for the radio coverage of the first Marshall football game in 1927. Tallman was also the head basketball coach at Marshall during the 1925–26 season, tallying a mark of 10–7. He resigned after the 1937 West Virginia University football season to become the Superintendent of the West Virginia State Police. Colonel Tallman and was credited with beginning the West Virginia State Police Academy. He was recommended to DuPont by FBI director J. Edgar Hoover, who stated that Colonel Tallman was responsible for West Virginia having one of the four best US state patrols. He was in charge of the security for the Manhattan Project Hanford, Washington(Nagasaki bomb-"Fat Man)". He built the security department at the Savannah River Plant in Aiken South Carolina Tallman was also a member of the West Virginia Legislature. He later lived in Augusta, Georgia, where he died on November 16, 1973. In September 2021, Trusty was inducted into the Marshall University Athletic Hall of Fame.

Trusty was born in Tariff West Virginia(Roane County), and is buried in the Evergreen Cemetery Point Marion Pennsylvania in the Hunger plot. He was married to Jane Hunger, and is survived by son James Tallman, M.D. Marietta, Georgia, and daughter Martha Tallman Buck Augusta. His son, Charles "Chuck" Tallman died in 1997.

Charles"TrustyTallman is in the West Virginia University Hall of Fame

.

== Head coaching record ==
=== Football ===
Year	Team	Overall	Conference	Standing	Bowl/playoffs
Marshall Thundering Herd (West Virginia Athletic Conference) (1925–1928)
1925	Marshall	4–1–4	3–0–2	1st	
1926	Marshall	5–4–1	3–1	T–2nd	
1927	Marshall	5–3–1	4–1	2nd	
1928	Marshall	8–1–1	5–0	1st	
Marshall:		22–9–7	15–2–2		
West Virginia Mountaineers (Independent) (1934–1936)
1934	West Virginia	6–4			
1935	West Virginia	3–4–2			
1936	West Virginia	6–4			
West Virginia:		15–12–2			
Total:		37–21–9			
