= Mountaineer Field (1924) =

Defunct stadium at West Virginia University

Coordinates: 39.637075°N 79.955170°W

- Jewel of the Mountains
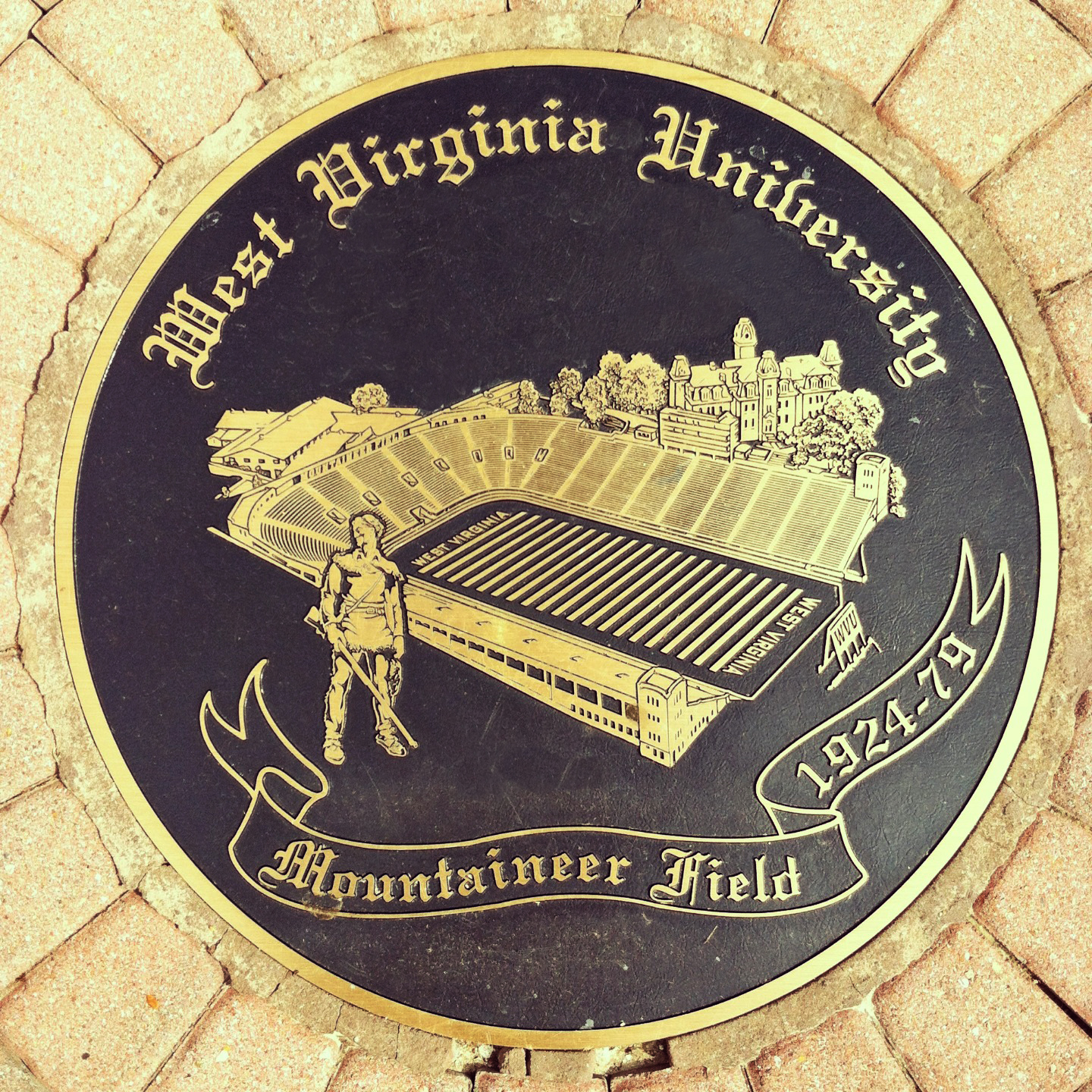
- Plaque marking where Mountaineer Field stood
- Interactive map of Mountaineer Field
- Location: Campus Drive; Morgantown, WV 26506
- Owner: West Virginia University
- Operator: West Virginia University
- Capacity: 38,000

Construction
- Opened: September 27, 1924
- Closed: November 10, 1979
- Demolished: 1987
- Cost: $740,000 (approx.)

Tenant
- West Virginia Mountaineers football (1924–1979)

Mountaineer Field, known as the "Jewel of the Mountains", was a football stadium located in downtown Morgantown, West Virginia. It was the home of the West Virginia Mountaineers football team.

The stadium, which cost approximately $740,000 to build, was located down the hill from Woodburn Hall, and bordered by Campus Drive to the north, University Avenue to the east, Woodburn and Chitwood Halls to the south, and eventually Beechurst Avenue on the west. It was built into the natural valley of the area, and was a square-cornered horseshoe.

The stadium opened on September 27, 1924, with a 21–6 win against West Virginia Wesleyan College. It held 38,000 by the time it closed, after a 24–17 loss in the 1979 Backyard Brawl to archrival Pitt. Due to the cramped location, it could not be expanded, and infrastructure could not be improved. Thus, in 1980, a new Mountaineer Field was opened on the site of the Morgantown Country Club to the north of the Downtown (main) campus, on what has become the Health Sciences campus.

The historic stadium was razed in 1987. The Life Sciences Building inhabits the area of the north stands, and Field Hall (formerly known as the Business and Economics building) inhabits the south. The former location of the playing field remains open as a field between the two buildings. At the southwestern corner, there is a horseshoe-shaped monument to the stadium that was erected in 2005.
