= Fairmont State Fighting Falcons football =

- First season: 1908; 118 years ago
- Athletic director: Bryan Spitzer
- Head coach: Luke Barker; 3rd season, 13–9 (.591)
- Location: Fairmont, West Virginia
- Stadium: Duvall-Rosier Field (capacity: 5,000)
- NCAA division: Division II
- Conference: MEC
- Colors: Maroon and white
- All-time record: 512–434–44 (.539)
- Playoff record: 2–4 (.333)

NAIA national championships
- 1967

Conference championships
- 1932, 1934, 1952, 1957, 1959, 1960, 1964, 1965, 1967, 1969, 1973, 1974, 1979, 1981, 1988, 1996, 2000

Division championships
- 1959, 1960, 1973, 1974, 1979
- Rivalries: Glenville State
- Mascot: Freddie the Falcon
- Marching band: The Falcon Marching Band
- Website: Fairmont Fighting Falcons

The Fairmont State Fighting Falcons football team represents Fairmont State University, located in Fairmont, West Virginia, in NCAA Division II college football.

The Fighting Falcons, who began playing football in 1909, compete as members of the Mountain East Conference.

Fairmont State have won one national championship, in 1967.

== History ==
=== Conferences ===
- 1908–1923: Independent
- 1924–2012: West Virginia Intercollegiate Athletic Conference
- 2013–present: Mountain East Conference

== Championships ==
=== National championships ===
Year	Association	Division	Head coach	Record	Opponent	Result
1967	NAIA (1)	Single (1)	Harold "Deacon" Duvall	11–0 (7–0 WVIAC)	Eastern Washington	W, 28–21

== Postseason appearances ==
=== NCAA Division II playoffs ===
The Falcons have made one appearance in the NCAA Division II playoffs, with a combined record of 0–1.

Year	Round	Opponent	Result
2016	First Round	IUP	L, 13–62

=== NAIA playoffs ===
Fairmont State made four appearances in the NAIA playoffs, with a combined record of 2–3 and one national championship.

Year	Round	Opponent	Result
1965	Semifinals	Saint John's (MN)	L, 7–28
1967	Semifinals; National Championship	Northern Michigan; Eastern Washington	W, 21–7; W, 28–21
1981	Quarterfinals	Hillsdale	L, 12–14
1988	First Round	Hillsdale	L, 7–24
