= West Virginia Intercollegiate Athletic Conference =

U.S. collegiate conference

- Association: NCAA (1993–2013); NAIA (until 1995)
- Founded: 1924
- Ceased: 2013
- Commissioner: Barry Blizzard (1987–2013)
- Sports fielded: 16; men's: 8; women's: 8
- Division: Division II
- No. of teams: 15
- Headquarters: Princeton, West Virginia
- Region: Appalachia

Locations
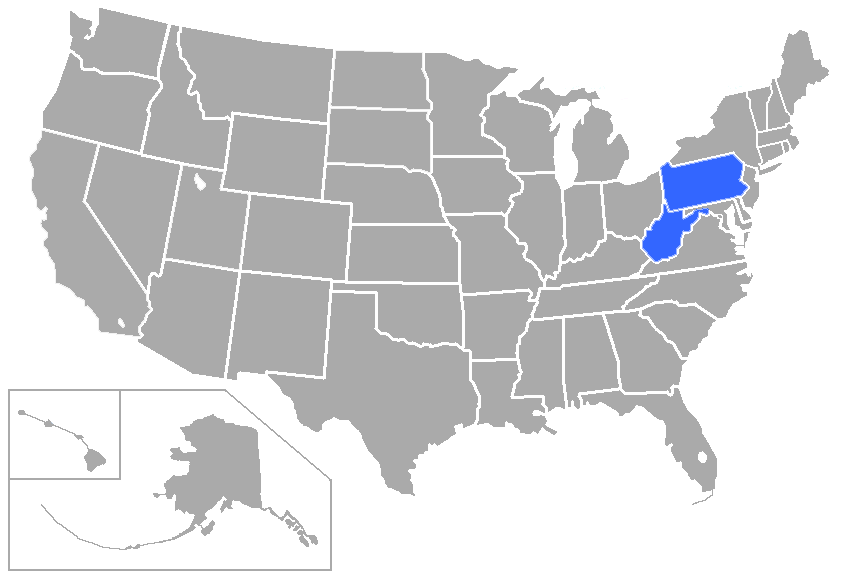

The West Virginia Intercollegiate Athletic Conference (WVIAC) was a collegiate athletic conference which historically operated in the state of West Virginia (with one Kentucky member in its early years and two Pennsylvania schools during its final years).

At its inception, the conference was affiliated with the National Association of Intercollegiate Athletics (NAIA). In 1995 it moved up to the Division II ranks of the National Collegiate Athletic Association (NCAA).

in June 2012 the football-playing members of the conference announced that they planned to withdraw to form a new conference at the end of the 2012–13 season. This led to all but one of the WVIAC's members leaving. The conference held its final athletic competitions in spring 2013 and was officially disbanded on September 1 of that year.

== History ==
The conference was one of the oldest in intercollegiate athletics, dating back to its founding in 1924 by the West Virginia Department of Education.

Its post-season basketball tournament, which was first conducted in 1936, was at the time of the conference's demise one of the oldest college post-season tournaments in continuous existence—only the Southern Conference men's basketball tournament, established in 1922, was older.

The WVIAC moved into the NCAA Division II in 1995 after its long affiliation with the NAIA.

In its final school year of 2012–13, the WVIAC offered championships in 16 sports and was headquartered in Princeton, West Virginia. Men's championships were offered in football, basketball, baseball, track, cross country, soccer, tennis, and golf. Women's titles were contested in volleyball, softball, basketball, cross country, soccer, track, tennis, and golf.

=== Chronological timeline ===
- 1924 – The West Virginia Intercollegiate Athletic Conference (WVIAC) was founded. Charter members included Alderson College, Bethany College, Broaddus College, Concord State Normal School (now Concord University), Davis & Elkins College, Fairmont State Normal School (now Fairmont State University), Glenville State Normal School (now Glenville State University), the Keyser Preparatory Branch of West Virginia University (now as Potomac State College), Marshall College (now Marshall University), Morris Harvey College (now the University of Charleston), New River State School (now the West Virginia Tech Institute of Technology), Salem College (now Salem University), Shepherd College (now Shepherd University), West Liberty State Teachers College (now West Liberty University), the West Virginia University and West Virginia Wesleyan College, beginning the 1924–25 academic year.
- 1927 – West Virginia left the WVIAC after the 1926–27 academic year.
- 1929 – Morehead State Normal and Teachers College (now Morehead State University) joined the WVIAC in the 1929–30 academic year.
- 1932 – Alderson–Broaddus College (now Alderson–Broaddus University) joined the WVIAC due to the merger of Alderson and Broaddus Colleges in the 1932–33 academic year.
- 1933 – Two institutions left the WVIAC to join their respective new home primary conferences, both effective after the 1932–33 academic year:
  - Marshall to the Buckeye Conference
  - and Morehead State to fully align with the Kentucky Intercollegiate Athletic Conference (KIAC) (a second conference they had joined since the 1931–32 school year)
- 1939 – Marshall rejoined the WVIAC as a non-competing member in the 1939–40 academic year.
- 1946 – Mountain State University joined the WVIAC in the 1946–47 academic year.
- 1948 – Marshall left the WVIAC for a second time to join the University Division ranks of the National Collegiate Athletic Association (NCAA) and the Ohio Valley Conference (OVC) after the 1947–48 academic year.
- 1955 – Bluefield State College (now Bluefield State University) and West Virginia State College (now West Virginia State University) joined the WVIAC in the 1955–56 academic year.
- 1957 – Wheeling College (later Wheeling Jesuit College, then Wheeling Jesuit University, now Wheeling University) joined the WVIAC in the 1957–58 academic year.
- 1962 – Bethany left the WVIAC to fully align with the Presidents' Athletic Conference (PAC; a second conference they had joined since the 1958–59 school year) after the 1961–62 academic year.
- 1963 – Potomac State left the WVIAC after the 1962–63 academic year.
- 1977 – Mountain State left the WVIAC after the 1976–77 academic year.
- 1986 – West Virginia Wesleyan left the WVIAC after the 1985–86 academic year.
- 1988 – West Virginia Wesleyan rejoined the WVIAC in the 1988–89 academic year.
- 1993 – The WVIAC joined the NCAA ranks, while still being affiliated with the National Association of Intercollegiate Athletics (NAIA), beginning the 1993–94 academic year.
- 1995 – The WVIAC had achieved full membership status within the NCAA Division II ranks after years being mostly affiliated in the NAIA, beginning the 1995–96 academic year.
- 1999 – Ohio Valley University joined the WVIAC in the 1999–2000 academic year.
- 2006:
  - West Virginia Tech left the WVIAC to return to the NAIA and join the Mid-South Conference (MSC) after the 2005–06 academic year.
  - The University of Pittsburgh at Johnstown (Pittsburgh–Johnstown) and Seton Hill University joined the WVIAC as provisional members in the 2006–07 academic year; becoming the first two institutions to join the conference from outside the state of West Virginia since the departure of Morehead in 1933.
- 2010 – Salem left the WVIAC to become an NCAA D-II Independent after the 2009–10 academic year.
- 2013 – The WVIAC ceased operations as an athletic conference after the 2012–13 academic year; as many schools left to join their respective new home primary conferences, beginning the 2013–14 academic year. The only school since the conference's breakup who hadn't still found a new conference home was Bluefield State, which ultimately ended up as a D-II Independent (until it rejoined the CIAA beginning the 2023–24 school year) alongside former member Salem (who would later join the G-MAC from 2013–14 to 2015–16, before returning as an independent):
  - Alderson–Broaddus, Davis & Elkins and Ohio Valley joined the Great Midwest Athletic Conference (G-MAC)
  - Concord, Charleston, Fairmont State, Glenville State, Shepherd, West Liberty, West Virginia State, West Virginia Wesleyan and Wheeling Jesuit joined alongside Notre Dame College of Ohio (a former full D-II Independent school), Urbana University (from the G-MAC), and the University of Virginia's College at Wise (from the Mid-South Conference of the NAIA) to form the Mountain East Conference (MEC)
  - and Pittsburgh–Johnstown and Seton Hill joined the Pennsylvania State Athletic Conference (PSAC)

== WVIAC breakup ==
On June 18, 2012, nine football-playing members of the WVIAC announced they would withdraw from the league to form a new regional all-sports conference.

The WVIAC officially ceased to exist on September 1, 2013. Eight of the nine football-playing members (Concord, Charleston, Fairmont State, Glenville State, Shepherd, West Liberty, West Virginia State, and West Virginia Wesleyan) and one non-football playing member (Wheeling Jesuit) of the conference joined a provisional D-II member from Virginia (UVA-Wise) and two associate Great Lakes Intercollegiate Athletic Conference members from Ohio (Notre Dame and Urbana) to form a new all-sports conference, the Mountain East Conference. Seton Hill and Pitt-Johnstown joined the Pennsylvania State Athletic Conference. Three of the remaining non-football members (Alderson–Broaddus, Davis & Elkins, and Ohio Valley) accepted invitations to join the Great Midwest Athletic Conference. The final remaining member, Bluefield State, competed as a D-II independent for 9 years before being invited to rejoin its former conference in the Central Intercollegiate Athletic Association in 2023.

=== Member schools at breakup ===
Institution (Note: All colleges are listed by their names as of 2020; most have had name changes over the years. See articles on individual schools for details.)	Location	Founded	Affiliation	Enrollment	Nickname	Joined (Note: Represents the calendar year when fall sports competition begins.)	Left (Note: Represents the calendar year when spring sports competition ends.)	Subsequent conference	Current conference
Alderson Broaddus College (Note: Non-football member at time of breakup.) (Note: Currently known as Alderson Broaddus University since 2013.)	Philippi, West Virginia	1871	ABCUSA	800	Battlers	1932	2013	Great Midwest (G-MAC) (Note: Currently an NCAA Division II athletic conference.) (2013–20); Mountain East (MEC) (2020–23)	Closed in 2023
Bluefield State College (Note: Currently known as Bluefield State University since 2022.)	Bluefield, West Virginia	1895	Public	1,800	Big Blues & Lady Blues	1955	2013	USCAA/D-II Independent (2013–23)	Central (CIAA) (2023–present)
University of Charleston	Charleston, West Virginia	1888	Nonsectarian	1,315	Golden Eagles	1924	2013	Mountain East (MEC) (2013–present)	
Concord University	Athens, West Virginia	1872	Public	3,000	Mountain Lions & Lady Lions	1924	2013	Mountain East (MEC) (2013–present)	
Davis & Elkins College	Elkins, West Virginia	1904	Presbyterian (PCUSA)	600	Senators; Lady Senators	1924	2013	Great Midwest (G-MAC) (2013–19)	Mountain East (MEC) (2019–present)
Fairmont State University	Fairmont, West Virginia	1865	Public	7,000	Fighting Falcons	1924	2013	Mountain East (MEC) (2013–present)	
Glenville State College (Note: Currently known as Glenville State University since 2022.)	Glenville, West Virginia	1872	Public	1,600	Pioneers & Lady Pioneers	1924	2013	Mountain East (MEC) (2013–present)	
Ohio Valley University	Vienna, West Virginia	1960	Churches of Christ	512	Fighting Scots	1999	2013	Great Midwest (G-MAC) (2013–21)	Closed in 2021 (Note: Ohio Valley's final conference affiliation was the River States Conference (RSC) during the 2021–22 school year. However, the school would later announce that it had close at the end of the fall 2021 semester without completing the rest of said school year.)
University of Pittsburgh at Johnstown	Johnstown, Pennsylvania	1927	Public	3,029	Mountain Cats	2006	2013	Pennsylvania (PSAC) (2013–present)	
Seton Hill University	Greensburg, Pennsylvania	1883	Catholic (S.C.S.H.)	1,860	Griffins	2006	2013	Pennsylvania (PSAC) (2013–present)	
Shepherd University	Shepherdstown, West Virginia	1871	Public	3,900	Rams	1924	2013	Mountain East (MEC) (2013–19)	Pennsylvania (PSAC) (2019–present)
West Liberty University	West Liberty, West Virginia	1837	Public	2,400	Hilltoppers & Lady Toppers	1924	2013	Mountain East (MEC) (2013–present)	
West Virginia State University	Institute, West Virginia	1891	Public	5,000	Yellow Jackets	1955	2013	Mountain East (MEC) (2013–present)	
West Virginia Wesleyan College	Buckhannon, West Virginia	1890	United; Methodist	1,400	Bobcats & Lady Bobcats	1924 (Note: West Virginia Wesleyan left the WVIAC after the 1985–86 school year; before rejoining in the 1988–89 school year.)	2013	Mountain East (MEC) (2013–present)	
Wheeling Jesuit University (Note: Wheeling added football in the 2019 fall season (2019–20 school year).) (Note: Currently known as Wheeling University since 2019.)	Wheeling, West Virginia	1954	Nonsectarian	1,232	Cardinals	1957	2013	Mountain East (MEC) (2013–present)	

=== Member schools leaving before 2013 ===
Institution (Note: All colleges are listed by their most recent names—the final names of defunct institutions, and names in use by existing institutions as of 2020. Most have had name changes over the years; see articles on individual schools for details.)	Location	Founded	Affiliation	Enrollment	Nickname	Joined (Note: Represents the calendar year when fall sports competition begins.)	Left (Note: Represents the calendar year when spring sports competition ends.)	Current conference
Alderson College	Alderson, West Virginia	1901	ABCUSA	?	?	1924	1932	Defunct (Note: Both Alderson College and Broaddus College merged to form the school that later became known as Alderson Broaddus University.)
Broaddus College	Philippi, West Virginia	1871	ABCUSA	?	?	1924	1932	Defunct
West Virginia University	Morgantown, West Virginia	1867	Public	29,707	Mountaineers	1924	1927	Big 12 (Note: Currently an NCAA Division I athletic conference.)
Morehead State University	Morehead, Kentucky	1887	Public	11,172	Eagles	1929	1933	Ohio Valley (OVC)
Mountain State University	Beckley, West Virginia	1933	Nonsectarian	8,200	Cougars	1946	1977	Closed in 2012 (Note: Mountain State's main campus in Beckley became the University of Charleston–Beckley on January 1, 2013. UC later established a new Beckley campus in 2015, leaving the former Mountain State campus, which was sold to West Virginia University and to where West Virginia University Institute of Technology (WVU Tech) moved in 2017.)
Marshall University (Note: Marshall stopped competition in the conference when it joined the Buckeye Conference from 1932–33 to 1938–39, but was required by state regulations to remain a member on a technical basis until 1949. Marshall was a non-competing member of the WVIAC from 1939–40 to 1947–48, when the Herd joined the Ohio Valley Conference (OVC) from 1948–49 to 1951–52, but Marshall had players picked for All-WVIAC during the decade as a non-competing member.)	Huntington, West Virginia	1837	Public	13,450	Thundering Herd	1924	1948	Sun Belt (SBC)
Bethany College	Bethany, West Virginia	1840	Disciples of Christ	1,030	Bison	1924	1962	Presidents' (PAC) (Note: Currently an NCAA Division III athletic conference.)
Potomac State College of West Virginia University	Keyser, West Virginia	1901	Public	?	Catamounts	1924	1963	Pennsylvania (PCAA) (Note: Currently an NJCAA athletic conference.)
West Virginia University Institute of Technology (Note: Formerly known as West Virginia Institute of Technology before 1996.)	Montgomery, West Virginia (Note: WVU Tech is now located in Beckley, but its campus was in Montgomery throughout the existence of the WVIAC.)	1895	Public	1,106	Golden Bears	1924	2006	River States (RSC) (Note: Currently an NAIA athletic conference.)
Salem University (Note: Formerly known as Salem International University before September 2017.)	Salem, West Virginia	1888	For-profit	835	Tigers	1924	2010	D-II Independent
