= 1961 Ohio Athletic Conference football season =

American college football season

- Sport: Football
- Teams: 14
- Champion: Wittenberg

Football seasons
- 1960 1962

1961 Ohio Athletic Conference football standings
	Conf.					Overall
Team	W		L		T	W		L		T
Wittenberg $	6	–	0	–	0	8	–	1	–	0
Akron	6	–	1	–	0	6	–	2	–	0
Otterbein	5	–	1	–	0	8	–	1	–	0
Muskingum	5	–	1	–	0	7	–	2	–	0
Capital	5	–	2	–	1	5	–	2	–	1
Wooster	5	–	3	–	0	6	–	3	–	0
Ohio Wesleyan	4	–	3	–	0	6	–	3	–	0
Kenyon	2	–	4	–	0	3	–	4	–	1
Mount Union	2	–	5	–	0	3	–	6	–	0
Denison	2	–	6	–	0	3	–	6	–	0
Heidelberg	1	–	4	–	1	1	–	7	–	1
Oberlin	1	–	5	–	0	2	–	5	–	1
Hiram	1	–	5	–	0	1	–	7	–	0
Marietta	0	–	5	–	1	0	–	8	–	1
$ – Conference champion

The 1961 Ohio Athletic Conference football season was the season of college football played by the 14 member schools of the Ohio Athletic Conference (OAC), commonly referred to as the "Ohio Conference", as part of the 1961 college football season.

The 1961 Wittenberg Tigers football team, in their seventh season under head coach Bill Edwards, won the OAC championship with an 8–1 record (6–0 against OAC opponents). The team ranked fourth among small college teams with an average of 400.9 yards per game of total offense. The Tigers also ranked fifth nationally in total defense, allowing an average of only 118.3 yards per game.

The 1961 Akron Zips football team, led by second-year head coach Bob Winterburn, finished in second place with a 6–2 record (6–1 against OAC opponents). Quarterback Joe Mackey led the team with 978 yards of total offense, and fullback George Deo led the team with 860 rushing yards.

== Teams ==
=== Wittenberg ===
1961 Wittenberg Tigers football

OAC champion
- Conference: Ohio Athletic Conference
- Record: 8–1 (6–0 OAC)
- Head coach: Bill Edwards (7th season)
- Home stadium: Wittenberg Stadium

The 1961 Wittenberg Tigers football team compiled an 8–1 record (6–0 against OAC opponents) and won the OAC championship.

Date	Opponent	Site	Result	Attendance	Source
September 23	Akron	Wittenberg Stadium; Springfield, OH	W 7–0	5,100–5,600	
September 30	at Alma*	Alma, MI	W 43–0	750	
October 7	at Heidelberg	Tiffin, OH	W 28–6	2,500–3,500	
October 14	Marietta^{†}	Wittenberg Stadium; Springfield, OH	W 52–0	5,100	
October 21	at Capital	Columbus, OH	W 36–0	4,500	
October 28	Lenoir Rhyne*	Wittenberg Stadium; Springield, OH	L 14–34	4,900	
November 4	Denison	Wittenberg Stadium; Springfield, OH	W 26–0	5,200	
November 11	at Ohio Wesleyan	Delaware, OH	W 41–7	6,632	
November 18	Wayne State*	Wittenberg Stadium; Springfield, OH	W 77–0	4,200	
*Non-conference game; ^{†}Homecoming

=== Akron ===
1961 Akron Zips football
- Conference: Ohio Athletic Conference
- Record: 6–2 (6–1 OAC)
- Head coach: Gordon K. Larson (1st season)
- Captain: Jim Lupori
- Home stadium: Rubber Bowl

The 1961 Akron Zips football team compiled a 6–2 record (6–1 against OAC opponents) and finished in second place in the OAC.

Date	Opponent	Site	Result	Attendance	Source
September 23	at Wittenberg	Wittenberg Stadium; Springfield, OH	L 0–7	5,100–5,600	
September 30	Denison	Rubber Bowl; Akron, OH	W 28–0	35,061	
October 7	vs. Ohio Wesleyan	Barberton Stadium; Barberton, OH	W 32–21	4,500	
October 14	at Heidelberg	Tiffin, OH	W 12–0	4,000	
October 21	at Wooster	Wooster, OH	W 31–8	4,700	
October 28	vs. No. 3 Baldwin–Wallace*	Clifford Stadium; Cuyahoga Falls, OH	L 0–7	6,513–6,531	
November 4	Muskingum	Rubber Bowl; Akron, OH	W 35–14	6,511	
November 18	at Mount Union	Mount Union Stadium; Alliance, OH	W 47–0	3,500	
*Non-conference game; Rankings from AP Poll released prior to the game

=== Otterbein ===
1961 Otterbein Cardinals football
- Conference: Ohio Athletic Conference
- Record: 8–1 (5–1 OAC)
- Head coach: Bob Agler (7th season)
- Home stadium: Memorial Stadium

The 1961 Otterbein Cardinals football team compiled an 8–1 record (5–1 against OAC opponents) and finished in a tie for third place in the OAC.

Date	Opponent	Site	Result	Attendance	Source
September 23	Findlay*	Westerville, OH	W 20–6	2,800	
September 30	at Heidelberg	Tiffin, OH	W 14–7	2,950–3,200	
October 7	at Kenyon	Gambier, OH	W 35–0	700	
October 14	Oberlin	Westerville, OH	W 28–7	4,000	
October 21	at Hiram	Hiram, OH	W 31–7	1,850	
October 28	Marietta	Westerville, OH	W 10–8	6,000	
November 4	Ashland*	Westerville, OH	W 15–13	2,000	
November 11	Capital	Westerville, OH	L 17–23	6,500	
November 18	at Centre*	Danville, KY	W 50–14	500	
*Non-conference game

=== Muskingum ===
1961 Muskingum Fighting Muskies football
- Conference: Ohio Athletic Conference
- Record: 7–2 (5–1 OAC)
- Head coach: Ed Sherman (17th season)
- Home stadium: McConagha Stadium

The 1961 Muskingum Fighting Muskies football team compiled a 7–2 record (5–1 against OAC opponents) and finished ina tie for third place in the OAC.

Date	Time	Opponent	Site	Result	Attendance	Source
September 23		at Marietta	Marietta, OH	W 14–0		
September 30	8:00 p.m.	at Baldwin-Wallace*	Berea, OH	L 6–35	8,500	
October 7		Denison	New Concord, OH	W 13–7		
October 14		Mount Union	New Concord, OH	W 36–0		
October 21		Heidelberg^{†}	McConagha Stadium; New Concord, OH	W 23–0	3,200	
October 28		at West Chester*	West Chester, PA	W 19–16	9,000	
November 4		at Akron	Rubber Bowl; Akron, OH	L 14–35	6,511	
November 11		at Wooster	Wooster, OH	W 6–0		
November 18		Findlay*	New Concord, OH	W 32–0		
*Non-conference game; ^{†}Homecoming; All times are in Eastern time

=== Capital ===
1961 Capital Crusaders football
- Conference: Ohio Athletic Conference
- Record: 5–2–1 (5–2–1 OAC)
- Head coach: Gene Slaughter (1st season)

The 1961 Capital Crusaders football team compiled a 5–2–1 record ( 5–2–1 against OAC opponents) and finished in fifth place in the OAC.

Date	Opponent	Site	Result	Attendance	Source
September 23	Heidelberg	Columbus, OH	T 0–0	2,500	
September 30	at Ohio Wesleyan	Delaware, OH	L 21–27		
October 7	at Hiram	Hiram, OH	W 40–0		
October 14	Kenyon	Columbus, OH	W 28–0		
October 21	Wittenberg	Columbus, OH	L 0–36	4,500	
October 28	Wooster	Columbus, OH	W 10–8		
November 4	at Marietta	Marietta, OH	W 15–6		
November 11	at Otterbein	Westerville, OH	W 23–17	6,500	

=== Wooster ===
1961 Wooster Fighting Scots football
- Conference: Ohio Athletic Conference
- Record: 6–3 (5–3 OAC)
- Head coach: Philip L. Shipe (13th season)

The 1961 Wooster Fighting Scots football team compiled a 6–3 record (5–3 against OAC opponents) and finished in sixth place in the OAC.

Date	Opponent	Site	Result	Attendance	Source
September 23	at Ashland*	Redwood Stadium; Ashland, OH	W 28–6		
September 30	Kenyon	Wooster, OH	W 41–0		
October 7	at Mount Union	Alliance, OH	W 16–6	1,500	
October 14	at Denison	Deeds Field; Granville, OH	W 3–0	2,368	
October 21	Akron	Wooster, OH	L 8–31	4,700	
October 28	at Capital	Columbus, OH	L 8–10		
November 4	Ohio Wesleyan	Wooster, OH	W 22–9		
November 11	Muskingum	Wooster, OH	L 0–6		
November 18	at Oberlin	Oberlin, OH	W 22–7		
*Non-conference game

=== Ohio Wesleyan ===
1961 Ohio Wesleyan Battling Bishops football
- Conference: Ohio Athletic Conference
- Record: 6–3 (4–3 OAC)
- Head coach: Glenn Fraser (16th season)

The 1961 Ohio Wesleyan Battling Bishops football team compiled a 6–3 record (4–3 against OAC opponents) and finished in seventh place in the OAC.

Date	Opponent	Site	Result	Attendance	Source
September 23	Kalamazoo*	Delaware, OH	W 32–6		
September 30	Capital	Delaware, OH	W 27–21		
October 7	vs. Akron	Barberton Stadium; Barberton, OH	L 21–32	4,500	
October 14	Hiram	Delaware, OH	W 29–0		
October 21	at Oberlin	Oberlin, OH	W 20–10		
October 28	Wabash*	Delaware, OH	W 13–7		
November 4	at Wooster	Wooster, OH	L 9–22		
November 11	Wittenberg	Delaware, OH	L 7–41	6,632	
November 18	at Denison	Granville, OH	W 8–0		
*Non-conference game

=== Kenyon ===
1961 Kenyon Lords football
- Conference: Ohio Athletic Conference
- Record: 3–4–1 (2–4–1 OAC)
- Head coach: Arthur Lave (1st season)

The 1961 Kenyon Lords football team represented Kenyon College of Gambier, Ohio. In their first year under head coach Arthur Lave, the Lords compiled a 3–4–1 record (2–4–1 against OAC opponents), finished in a three-way tie for eighth place in the OAC, and were outscored by a total of 204 to 137.

Date	Opponent	Site	Result	Attendance	Source
September 23	Wilmington*	Gambier, OH	W 26–0		
September 30	at Wooster	Wooster, OH	L 0–41		
October 7	Otterbein	Gambier, OH	L 0–35	700	
October 14	at Capital	Columbus, OH	W 0–28		
October 21	Marietta	Gambier, OH	T 41–41		
October 28	at Oberlin	Oberlin, OH	W 28–13		
November 4	at Mount Union	Alliance, OH	L 18–32		
November 11	Hiram	Gambier, OH	W 24–14		
*Non-conference game

=== Mount Union ===
1961 Mount Union Purple Raiders football
- Conference: Ohio Athletic Conference
- Record: 3–6 (2–5 OAC)
- Head coach: Duke Barret (6th season)

The 1961 Mount Union Purple Raiders football team represented the University of Mount Union of Alliance, Ohio. In their sixth and final season under head coach Duke Barret, the Purple Raiders compiled a 3–6 record (2–5 against OAC opponents), finished in ninth place in the OAC, and were outscored by a total of 208 to 121.

Date	Opponent	Site	Result	Attendance	Source
September 23	West Virginia Wesleyan*	Alliance, OH	L 6–29		
September 30	at Marietta	Marietta, OH	W 12–7		
October 7	Wooster	Alliance, OH	L 6–16	1,500	
October 14	at Muskingum	New Concord, OH	L 0–36		
October 21	Denison	Alliance, OH	L 20–21		
October 28	at Hiram	Hiram, OH	L 20–21		
November 4	Kenyon	Alliance, OH	W 32–18		
November 11	at Ashland*	Redwood Stadium; Ashland, OH	W 25–13		
November 18	Akron	Alliance, OH	L 0–47	3,500	
*Non-conference game

=== Denison ===
1961 Denison Big Red football
- Conference: Ohio Athletic Conference
- Record: 3–6 (2–5 OAC)
- Head coach: Keith W. Piper (8th season)

The 1961 Denison Big Red football team represented Denison University of Granville, Ohio. In their eighth year under head coach Keith W. Piper, the Big Red compiled a 3–6 record (2–5 against OAC opponents), finished in tenth place in the OAC, and were outscored by a total of 149 to 105.

Date	Opponent	Site	Result	Attendance	Source
September 23	Centre*	Granville, OH	W 35–6		
September 30	at Akron	Rubber Bowl; Akron, OH	L 0–28	35,061	
October 7	at Muskingum	Deeds Field; New Concord, OH	L 7–13		
October 14	Wooster^{†}	Granville, OH	L 0–3	2,368	
October 21	Mount Union	Alliance, OH	W 21–20		
October 28	Heidelberg	Granville, OH	L 7–35	3,000	
November 4	at Wittenberg	Springfield, OH	L 0–26		
November 11	Oberlin	Granville, OH	W 35–10		
November 18	Ohio Wesleyan	Granville, OH	L 0–8		
*Non-conference game; ^{†}Homecoming

=== Heidelberg ===
1961 Heidelberg Student Princes football
- Conference: Ohio Athletic Conference
- Record: 1–7–1 (1–4–1 OAC)
- Head coach: Bob Winterburn (2nd season)

The 1961 Heidelberg Student Princes football team represented Heidelberg College of Tiffin, Ohio. In their second and final year under head coach Bob Winterburn, the Student Princes compiled a 1–7–1 record (1–4–1 against OAC opponents), finished in eleventh place in the OAC, and were outscored by a total of 159 to 68.

Date	Opponent	Site	Result	Attendance	Source
September 23	at Capital	Columbus, OH	T 0–0	2,500	
September 30	Otterbein	Tiffin, OH	L 7–14	3,200	
October 7	Wittenberg	Tiffin, OH	L 6–28	2,500–3,500	
October 14	Akron	Tiffin, OH	L 0–12	3,900	
October 21	at Muskingum	New Concord, OH	L 0–23	3,200	
October 28	at Denison	Granville, OH	W 35–7	3,600	
November 4	at No. 2 Baldwin-Wallace*	Ray E. Watts Stadium; Berea, OH	L 7–33	7,500–8,300	
November 11	Wabash*	Tiffin, OH	L 6–21	2,500	
November 18	at Hillsdale*	Hillsdale, MI	L 7–21		
*Non-conference game; Rankings from Coaches' Poll released prior to the game

=== Hiram ===
1961 Hiram Terriers football
- Conference: Ohio Athletic Conference
- Record: 1–7 (1–5 OAC)
- Head coach: Mike Koval (3rd season)

The 1961 Hiram Terriers football team represented the Hiram College of Hiram, Ohio. In their third and final year under head coach Mike Koval, the Terriers compiled a 1–7 record (1–5 against OAC opponents), tied for twelfth place in the OAC, and were outscored opponents by a total of 229 to 71.

Date	Opponent	Site	Result	Attendance	Source
September 30	at Oberlin	Oberlin, OH	L 15–35	2,000	
October 7	Capital	Hiram, OH	L 0–40		
October 14	at Ohio Wesleyan	Delaware, OH	L 0–29		
October 21	Otterbein	Hiram, OH	L 7–31	1,850	
October 28	Mount Union	Hiram, OH	W 21–20		
November 4	at Kalamazoo*	Angell Field; Kalamazoo, MI	L 6–28	2,100	
November 11	at Kenyon	Gambier, OH	L 14–28		
November 18	Grove City*	Hiram, OH	L 8–22		
*Non-conference game

=== Oberlin ===
1961 Oberlin Yeomen football
- Conference: Ohio Athletic Conference
- Record: 2–5–1 (1–5 OAC)
- Head coach: J. William Grice (4th season)

The 1961 Oberlin Yeomen football team represented Oberlin College of Oberlin, Ohio. In their fourth season under head coach J. William Grice, the Yeomen compiled a 2–5–1 record (1–5 against OAC opponents).

Date	Opponent	Site	Result	Attendance	Source
September 30	Hiram	Oberlin, OH	W 35–15	2,000	
October 7	Carnegie Tech*	Oberlin, OH	W 26–7		
October 14	at Otterbein	Westerville, OH	L 7–28	4,000	
October 21	Ohio Wesleyan	Oberlin, OH	L 10–20		
October 28	Kenyon	Oberlin, OH	L 13–28		
November 4	at Susquehanna*	University Field; Selinsgrove, PA	T 7–7	3,000	
November 11	at Denison	Granville, OH	L 10–35		
November 18	at Wooster	Wooster, OH	L 7–22		
*Non-conference game

=== Marietta ===
1961 Marietta Pioneers football
- Conference: Ohio Athletic Conference
- Record: 0–8–1 (0–5–1 OAC)
- Head coach: Kenneth A. Mead (5th season)

The 1961 Marietta Pioneers football team represented the Marietta College of Marietta, Ohio. In their fifth year under head coach Kenneth A. Mead, the Pioneers compiled a 0–8–1 record (0–5–1 against OAC opponents), finished in last place in the OAC, and were outscored by a total of 223 to 101.

Date	Opponent	Site	Result	Attendance	Source
September 23	Muskingum	Marietta, OH	L 0–14		
September 30	Mount Union	Marietta, OH	L 7–12		
October 7	West Liberty State*	Marietta, OH	L 12–21		
October 14	at Wittenberg	Springield, OH	L 0–52		
October 21	at Kenyon	Gambier, OH	T 41–41		
October 28	at Otterbein	Westerville, OH	L 8–10	6,000	
November 4	Capital	Marietta, OH	L 6–15		
November 11	at Waynesburg*	Waynesburg, PA	L 7–32		
November 18	at Geneva*	Beaver Falls, PA	L 20–26	5,000	
*Non-conference game
