= 1960 Akron Zips football team =

American college football season

1960 Akron Zips football
- Conference: Ohio Athletic Conference
- Record: 1–8 (1–6 OAC)
- Head coach: Joe McMullen (7th season)
- Captain: Tom Murphy
- Home stadium: Rubber Bowl

1960 Ohio Athletic Conference football standings
	Conf.					Overall
Team	W		L		T	W		L		T
No. 9 Muskingum $	7	–	0	–	0	9	–	0	–	0
Ohio Wesleyan	6	–	1	–	0	7	–	2	–	0
Otterbein	5	–	1	–	0	8	–	1	–	0
Wittenberg	5	–	1	–	0	8	–	1	–	0
Wooster	5	–	3	–	0	6	–	3	–	0
Denison	4	–	3	–	0	6	–	3	–	0
Marietta	4	–	3	–	0	6	–	3	–	0
Heidelberg	3	–	3	–	0	5	–	4	–	0
Mount Union	3	–	5	–	0	3	–	6	–	0
Oberlin	2	–	4	–	0	4	–	4	–	0
Capital	2	–	6	–	0	2	–	6	–	0
Kenyon	1	–	6	–	0	2	–	6	–	0
Akron	1	–	6	–	0	1	–	8	–	0
Hiram	0	–	6	–	0	0	–	7	–	1
$ – Conference champion; Rankings from AP small college poll

The 1960 Akron Zips football team represented Akron University in the 1960 college football season as a member of the Ohio Athletic Conference. Led by seventh-year head coach Joe McMullen, the Zips played their home games at the Rubber Bowl in Akron, Ohio. They finished the season with a record of 1–8 overall and 1–6 in OAC play. They were outscored by their opponents 70–269.

== Schedule ==
Date	Opponent	Site	Result	Attendance	Source
September 24	Mount Union	Rubber Bowl; Akron, OH	L 0–27	33,868	
October 1	at Denison	Granville, OH	L 0–27	2,518	
October 8	at Ohio Wesleyan	Selby Field; Delaware, OH	L 6–16	5,000	
October 15	at Baldwin–Wallace*	Berea, OH	L 0–27	6,000	
October 22	Wooster	Rubber Bowl; Akron, OH	W 21–20	2,500	
October 29	at Muskingum	McConagha Stadium; New Concord, OH	L 0–58	6,500	
November 5	Wittenberg	Rubber Bowl; Akron, OH	L 15–40	1,500	
November 12	Heidelberg	Rubber Bowl; Akron, OH	L 7–20	1,200	
November 19	at Youngstown State*	Rayen Stadium; Youngstown, OH (Steel Tire)	L 21–34	5,158	
*Non-conference game
