= 1958 Akron Zips football team =

American college football season

1958 Akron Zips football
- Conference: Ohio Athletic Conference
- Record: 6–2–1 (6–2 OAC)
- Head coach: Joe McMullen (5th season)
- Captain: Tom Murphy
- Home stadium: Rubber Bowl

1958 Ohio Athletic Conference football standings
| | Conf. | | | | | Overall |
| Team | W | | L | | T | W | | L | | T |
|---|---|---|---|---|---|---|---|---|---|---|
| No. T–16 Wittenberg $ | 6 | – | 0 | – | 0 | 8 | – | 1 | – | 0 |
| Muskingum | 6 | – | 1 | – | 0 | 8 | – | 1 | – | 0 |
| Akron | 6 | – | 2 | – | 0 | 6 | – | 2 | – | 1 |
| Wooster | 4 | – | 2 | – | 0 | 6 | – | 3 | – | 0 |
| Capital | 4 | – | 3 | – | 1 | 4 | – | 3 | – | 1 |
| Heidelberg | 3 | – | 3 | – | 0 | 6 | – | 3 | – | 0 |
| Ohio Wesleyan | 3 | – | 3 | – | 0 | 6 | – | 3 | – | 0 |
| Marietta | 3 | – | 4 | – | 0 | 5 | – | 4 | – | 0 |
| Kenyon | 3 | – | 4 | – | 0 | 3 | – | 4 | – | 0 |
| Denison | 3 | – | 5 | – | 0 | 4 | – | 5 | – | 0 |
| Otterbein | 2 | – | 4 | – | 1 | 3 | – | 4 | – | 2 |
| Mount Union | 3 | – | 6 | – | 0 | 3 | – | 6 | – | 0 |
| Oberlin | 1 | – | 5 | – | 0 | 3 | – | 5 | – | 0 |
| Hiram | 1 | – | 6 | – | 0 | 1 | – | 7 | – | 0 |
$ – Conference champion; Rankings from UPI small college poll

The 1958 Akron Zips football team represented Akron University in the 1958 college football season as a member of the Ohio Athletic Conference. Led by fifth-year head coach Joe McMullen, the Zips played their home games at the Rubber Bowl in Akron, Ohio. They finished the season with a record of 6–2–1 overall and 6–2 in OAC play. They outscored their opponents 166–82.

== Schedule ==
| Date | Opponent | Site | Result |
|---|---|---|---|
| September 20 | Mount Union | Rubber Bowl; Akron, OH | W 18–0 |
| September 27 | at Muskingum | McConagha Stadium; New Concord, OH | W 8–7 |
| October 4 | at Ohio Wesleyan | Selby Field; Delaware, OH | L 0–13 |
| October 11 | Heidelberg | Rubber Bowl; Akron, OH | W 11–0 |
| October 18 | Wooster | Rubber Bowl; Akron, OH | W 28–20 |
| October 25 | Wittenberg | Rubber Bowl; Akron, OH | L 6–28 |
| November 1 | Hiram | Rubber Bowl; Akron, OH | W 47–0 |
| November 8 | at Denison | Granville, OH | W 48–14 |
| November 15 | at Baldwin–Wallace* | Berea, OH | T 0–0 |
*Non-conference game
