= 1957 Akron Zips football team =

American college football season

1957 Akron Zips football
- Conference: Ohio Athletic Conference
- Record: 7–1–1 (5–1–1 OAC)
- Head coach: Joe McMullen (4th season)
- Captain: Bob Hatherill
- Home stadium: Rubber Bowl

1957 Ohio Athletic Conference football standings
	Conf.					Overall
Team	W		L		T	W		L		T
Denison +	6	–	1	–	0	8	–	1	–	0
Wittenberg +	6	–	1	–	0	7	–	2	–	0
Akron	5	–	1	–	1	7	–	1	–	1
Capital	5	–	1	–	1	6	–	1	–	1
Heidelberg	4	–	2	–	0	7	–	2	–	0
Otterbein	4	–	2	–	0	5	–	3	–	0
Muskingum	4	–	3	–	0	5	–	4	–	0
Ohio Wesleyan	3	–	4	–	0	4	–	5	–	0
Hiram	2	–	4	–	0	3	–	5	–	0
Kenyon	1	–	3	–	0	2	–	3	–	1
Wooster	2	–	6	–	0	3	–	6	–	0
Mount Union	2	–	6	–	0	2	–	6	–	0
Marietta	1	–	5	–	0	2	–	6	–	0
Oberlin	0	–	6	–	0	1	–	6	–	1
+ – Conference co-champions

The 1957 Akron Zips football team represented Akron University in the 1957 college football season as a member of the Ohio Athletic Conference. Led by fourth-year head coach Joe McMullen, the Zips played their home games at the Rubber Bowl in Akron, Ohio. They finished the season with a record of 7–1–1 overall and 5–1–1 in OAC play. They were outscored by their opponents 208–87.

== Schedule ==
Date	Opponent	Site	Result
September 21	at Wittenberg	Wittenberg Stadium; Springfield, OH	W 9–7
September 28	Muskingum	Rubber Bowl; Akron, OH	L 7–26
October 5	at Baldwin–Wallace*	Berea, OH	W 29–6
October 12	Ohio Wesleyan	Rubber Bowl; Akron, OH	W 20–0
October 19	Capital	Rubber Bowl; Akron, OH	T 13–13
October 26	at Wooster	Wooster, OH	W 27–7
November 2	at Grove City*	Grove City, PA	W 40–0
November 9	Mount Union	Rubber Bowl; Akron, OH	W 38–7
November 16	at Heidelberg	Tiffin, OH	W 25–21
*Non-conference game
