= Keith Piper =

Keith Piper may refer to:

- Keith Piper (artist) (born 1960), British artist
- Keith Piper (cricketer) (1969–2026), English cricketer
- Keith W. Piper (1921–1997), American football coach
