= 1955 Ohio Athletic Conference football season =

American college football season

- Sport: Football
- Teams: 14
- Champion: Muskingum

Football seasons
- 1954 1956

1955 Ohio Athletic Conference football standings
	Conf.					Overall
Team	W		L		T	W		L		T
Muskingum $	7	–	0	–	0	8	–	0	–	0
Heidelberg	5	–	0	–	0	9	–	0	–	0
Akron	6	–	2	–	0	6	–	2	–	0
Wooster	5	–	2	–	0	7	–	2	–	0
Hiram	3	–	2	–	0	5	–	3	–	0
Capital	4	–	3	–	0	5	–	3	–	0
Denison	3	–	3	–	2	4	–	3	–	2
Wittenberg	3	–	3	–	2	4	–	3	–	2
Ohio Wesleyan	1	–	2	–	2	3	–	4	–	2
Otterbein	2	–	4	–	1	2	–	5	–	1
Mount Union	1	–	5	–	1	1	–	5	–	2
Kenyon	0	–	4	–	0	0	–	7	–	0
Marietta	0	–	5	–	0	0	–	8	–	0
Oberlin	0	–	5	–	0	0	–	8	–	0
$ – Conference champion

The 1955 Ohio Athletic Conference football season was the season of college football played by the 14 member schools of the Ohio Athletic Conference (OAC), commonly referred to as the "Ohio Conference", as part of the 1955 college football season.

The Muskingum Fighting Muskies, in their eleventh season under head coach Ed Sherman, won the OAC championship with an 8–0 record (7–0 against OAC opponents).

The Heidelberg Student Princes, led by tenth-year head coach Paul Hoernemann, finished in second place with a 9–0 record (5–0 against OAC opponents).

== Teams ==
=== Muskingum ===
1955 Muskingum Fighting Muskies football

OAC champion
- Conference: Ohio Athletic Conference
- Record: 8–0 (7–0 OAC)
- Head coach: Ed Sherman (11th season)
- Home stadium: McConagha Stadium

The 1955 Muskingum Fighting Muskies football team represented Muskingum University of New Concord, Ohio. In their eleventh season under head coach Ed Sherman, the Fighting Muskies compiled a perfect 8–0 record (7–0 against OAC opponents), won the OAC championship, and outscored opponents by a total of 291 to 60. It was Muskingum's first conference championship since 1950 and its first perfect season since 1931.

Sherman won the "Ohio college football coach of the year" award, based on a poll of Ohio coaches. He defeated Doyt Perry and Ara Parseghian who finished second and third.

The 1955 season was one of four perfect seasons in Muskingum football history, along with 1926, 1931, and 1960.

The team played its home games at McConagha Stadium in New Concord, Ohio.

Date	Opponent	Site	Result	Attendance	Source
September 24	at Marietta	Zanesville, OH	W 53–0		
October 1	at Akron	Rubber Bowl; Akron, OH	W 19–7	24,025	
October 8	Ohio Wesleyan	McConagha Stadium; New Concord, OH	W 23–19		
October 15	Washington & Jefferson*	McConagha Stadium; New Concord, OH	W 29–0		
October 22	at Wooster	Wooster, OH	W 35–14		
October 29	Capital	McConagha Stadium; New Concord, OH	W 54–14		
November 5	Denison	McConagha Stadium; New Concord, OH	W 38–0		
November 12	at Mount Union	Alliance, OH	W 40–6		
*Non-conference game

=== Heidelberg ===
1955 Heidelberg Student Princes football
- Conference: Ohio Athletic Conference
- Record: 9–0 (5–0 OAC)
- Head coach: Paul Hoernemann (10th season)

The 1955 Heidelberg Student Princes football team represented Heidelberg College of Tiffin, Ohio. In their tenth year under head coach Paul Hoernemann, the Student Princes compiled a 9–0 record (5–0 against conference opponents), finished in second place in the OAC, and outscored opponents by a total of 253 to 96.

The team's statistical leaders included halfback Walter Livingston with 931 rushing yards, 178 receiving yards, and 102 points scored, and quarterback Bryan Powers with 596 passing yards. Three Heidelberg players were selected as first-team players on the International News Service's All-Ohio Conference football team: Livingston; back Roy King; and guard Jerry Zimmerman.

The 1955 season was the third perfect season in Heidelberg football history. Other perfect seasons were 1930, 1948, and 1972.

Date	Opponent	Site	Result	Attendance	Source
September 17	Bluffton*	Tiffin, OH	W 40–12		
September 24	at Hope*	Holland, MI	W 28–6		
October 1	at Ohio Wesleyan	Delaware, OH	W 35–26		
October 8	Wittenberg	Tiffin, OH	W 20–0		
October 15	at Capital	Columbus, OH	W 34–32		
October 22	Baldwin–Wallace*	Tiffin, OH	W 34–0		
October 29	Mount Union	Tiffin, OH	W 27–0		
November 5	at Saint Joseph's*	Rensselaer, IN	W 14–13		
November 12	Akron	Columbian Stadium; Tiffin, OH	W 21–7	5,000	
*Non-conference game

=== Akron ===
1955 Akron Zips football
- Conference: Ohio Athletic Conference
- Record: 6–2 (6–2 OAC)
- Head coach: Joe McMullen (2nd season)
- Captain: Mario Russo
- Home stadium: Rubber Bowl

The 1955 Akron Zips football team represented the University of Akron. In its second season under head coach Joe McMullen, the team compiled a 6–2 record (6–2 against OAC opponents), finished in second place in the OAC, and outscored opponents by a total of 245 to 73. Mario Russo was the team captain. The team played its home games at the Rubber Bowl in Akron, Ohio.

Date	Opponent	Site	Result	Attendance	Source
September 24	at Wittenberg	Springfield, OH	W 21–7		
October 1	Muskingum	Rubber Bowl; Akron, OH	L 7–19	24,025	
October 8	at Otterbein	Westerville, OH	W 58–0		
October 15	Mount Union	Rubber Bowl; Akron, OH	W 34–0		
October 22	Denison	Rubber Bowl; Akron, OH	W 19–7		
October 29	at Wooster	Wooster, OH	W 53–6		
November 5	Oberlin	Rubber Bowl; Akron, OH	W 46–13		
November 12	at Heidelberg	Tiffin, OH	L 7–17		

=== Wooster ===
1955 Wooster Fighting Scots football
- Conference: Ohio Athletic Conference
- Record: 7–2 (5–2 OAC)
- Head coach: Philip L. Shipe (7th season)

The 1955 Wooster Fighting Scots football team represented the College of Wooster of Wooster, Ohio. In their seventh year under head coach Philip L. Shpe, the Fighting Scots compiled a 2–4–2 record (2–4–2 against OAC opponents), the Fighting Scots finished in fourth place in the OAC, and were outscored opponents by a total of 245 to 163.

Date	Opponent	Site	Result	Attendance	Source
September 24	at Allegheny*	Meadville, PA	W 41–13		
October 1	Kenyon	Wooster, OH	W 27–0		
October 8	at Waynesburg*	Waynesburg, PA	W 27–12		
October 15	at Denison	Granville, OH	W 21–19		
October 22	Muskingum	Wooster, OH	L 14–35		
October 29	Akron	Wooster, OH	L 6–53		
November 5	at Mount Union	Alliance, OH	W 27–13		
November 12	at Hiram	Hiram, OH	W 35–12		
November 19	Oberlin	Wooster, OH	W 47–6		
*Non-conference game

=== Hiram ===
1955 Hiram Terriers football
- Conference: Ohio Athletic Conference
- Record: 5–3 (3–2 OAC)
- Head coach: Edward Chupa (2nd season)

The 1955 Hiram Terriers football team represented the Hiram College of Hiram, Ohio. In their second year under head coach Edward Chupa, the Terriers compiled a 5–3 record (3–2 against OAC opponents), finished in fifth place in the OAC, and were outscored opponents by a total of 144 to 136.

Date	Opponent	Site	Result	Attendance	Source
September 24	at Bluffton*	Bluffton, OH	W 14–6		
October 1	Capital	Hiram, OH	L 12–15		
October 8	at Grove City*	Grove City, PA	W 19–6		
October 15	Marietta	Hiram, OH	W 32–0		
October 22	at Bethany (WV)*	Bethany, WV	L 0–61		
October 29	Otterbein	Hiram, OH	W 27–0		
November 5	at Kenyon	Gambier, OH	W 27–0		
November 12	Wooster	Hiram, OH	L 12–35		
*Non-conference game

=== Capital ===
1955 Capital Crusaders football
- Conference: Ohio Athletic Conference
- Record: 5–3 (4–3 OAC)
- Head coach: Jack Landrum (5th season)

The 1955 Capital Crusaders football team represented Capital University of Columbus, Ohio. The Crusaders compiled a 5–3 record (4–3 against OAC opponents), finished in sixth place in the OAC, and outscored opponents by a total of 224 to 147.

Date	Opponent	Site	Result	Attendance	Source
September 24	Ohio Northern*	Columbus, OH	W 27–7		
October 1	at Hiram	Hiram, OH	W 15–12		
October 8	at Marietta	Marietta, OH	W 37–0		
October 15	Heidelberg	Columbus, OH	L 32–34		
October 22	Kenyon	Columbus, OH	W 46–6		
October 29	at Muskingum	McConagha Stadium; New Concord, OH	L 14–54		
November 5	Wittenberg	Columbus, OH	L 20–27		
November 12	Otterbein	Memorial Stadium; Westerville, OH	W 33–7		
*Non-conference game

=== Denison ===
1955 Denison Big Red football
- Conference: Ohio Athletic Conference
- Record: 4–3–2 (3–3–2 OAC)
- Head coach: Keith W. Piper (2nd season)

The 1955 Denison Big Red football team represented Denison University of Granville, Ohio. In their second year under head coach Keith W. Piper, the Big Red compiled a 4–3–2 record (3–3–2 against OAC opponents), tied for seventh place in the OAC, and outscored opponents by a total of 146 to 144.

Date	Opponent	Site	Result	Attendance	Source
September 24	Washington & Jefferson*	Granville, OH	W 27–13		
October 1	at Mount Union	Alliance, OH	T 19–19		
October 8	at Kenyon	Gambier, OH	W 34–6		
October 15	Wooster	Granville, OH	L 19–21		
October 22	at Akron	Rubber Bowl; Akron, OH	L 7–19		
October 29	Wittenberg	Granville, OH	W 13–8		
November 5	at Muskingum	McConagha Stadium; New Concord, OH	L 0–38		
November 12	at Oberlin	Oberlin, OH	W 27–20		
November 19	Ohio Wesleyan	Granville, OH	T 0–0		
*Non-conference game

=== Wittenberg ===
1955 Wittenberg Tigers football
- Conference: Ohio Athletic Conference
- Record: 4–3–2 (3–3–2 OAC)
- Head coach: Bill Edwards (1st season)

The 1955 Wittenberg Tigers football team represented the Wittenberg University of Springfield, Ohio. In their first year under head coach Bill Edwards, the Tigers compiled a 4–3–2 record (3–3–2 against OAC opponents), finished in a tie for seventh place in the OAC, and outscored opponents by a total of 154 to 119.

Date	Opponent	Site	Result	Attendance	Source
September 17	Olivet*	Springfield, OH	W 28–0		
September 24	Akron	Springfield, OH	L 7–21		
October 1	Marietta	Springfield, OH	W 44–13		
October 8	at Heidelberg	Tiffin, OH	L 0–20		
October 15	Otterbein	Springfield, OH	T 13–13		
October 22	at Mount Union	Alliance, OH	W 14–6		
October 29	at Denison	Granville, OH	L 8–13		
November 5	at Capital	Columbus, OH	W 27–20		
November 12	at Ohio Wesleyan	Delaware, OH	T 13–13		
*Non-conference game

=== Ohio Wesleyan ===
1955 Ohio Wesleyan Battling Bishops football
- Conference: Ohio Athletic Conference
- Record: 3–4–2 (1–2–2 OAC)
- Head coach: Glenn Fraser (9th season)

The 1955 Ohio Wesleyan Battling Bishops football team represented the Wittenberg University of Delaware, Ohio. In their ninth year under head coach Glenn Fraser, the Battling Bishops compiled a 3–4–2 record (1–2–2 against OAC opponents), finished in ninth place in the OAC, and outscored opponents by a total of 173 to 171.

Date	Opponent	Site	Result	Attendance	Source
September 24	Rochester*	Delaware, OH	W 26–19		
October 1	Heidelberg	Delaware, OH	L 26–35		
October 8	at Muskingum	McConagha Stadium; New Concord, OH	L 19–23		
October 15	at Wabash*	Ingalls Field; Crawfordsville, IN	L 14–27		
October 22	at Oberlin	Oberlin, OH	W 20–14		
October 29	Sewanee*	Delaware, OH	W 42–12		
November 5	Baldwin-Wallace*	Delaware, OH	L 13–28		
November 12	Wittenberg	Delaware, OH	T 13–13		
November 19	at Denison	Granville, OH	T 0–0		
*Non-conference game

=== Otterbein ===
1955 Otterbein Cardinals football
- Conference: Ohio Athletic Conference
- Record: 2–5–1 (2–4–1 OAC)
- Head coach: Bob Agler (1st season)
- Home stadium: Memorial Stadium

The 1955 Otterbein Cardinals football team represented Otterbein University of Westerville, Ohio. In their first season under head coach Bob Agler, the Cardinals compiled a 2–5–1 record (2–4–1 against OAC opponents), finished in tenth place in the OAC, and were outscored by a total of 226 to 84.

Date	Opponent	Site	Result	Attendance	Source
September 17	at Centre*	Danville, KY	L 13–28	1,500	
September 24	Mount Union	Memorial Stadium; Westerville, OH	L 7–45		
October 1	at Oberlin	Oberlin, OH	W 19–14		
October 8	Akron	Memorial Stadium; Westerville, OH	L 0–58		
October 13	Marietta	Memorial Stadium; Westerville, OH	W 12–7		
October 15	at Wittenberg	Springfield, OH	T 13–13		
October 29	at Hiram	Hiram, OH	L 13–28		
November 12	Capital	Memorial Stadium; Westerville, OH	L 7–33		
*Non-conference game

=== Mount Union ===
1955 Mount Union Purple Raiders football
- Conference: Ohio Athletic Conference
- Record: 1–5–2 (1–5–1 OAC)
- Head coach: Nelson M. Jones (6th season)

The 1955 Mount Union Purple Raiders football team represented the University of Mount Union of Alliance, Ohio. In their sixth and final season under head coach Nelson M. Jones, the Purple Raiders compiled a 1–5–2 record (1–5–1 against OAC opponents), finished in eleventh place in the OAC, and were outscored by a total of 174 to 95.

Date	Opponent	Site	Result	Attendance	Source
September 24	at Otterbein	Memorial Stadium; Westerville, OH	W 45–7		
October 1	Denison	Alliance, OH	T 19–19		
October 8	at Western Reserve*	Clarke Field; Cleveland, OH	T 6–6		
October 15	at Akron	Akron, OH	L 0–34		
October 22	Wittenberg	Alliance, OH	L 6–14		
October 29	at Heidelberg	Tiffin, OH	L 0–27		
November 5	Wooster	Alliance, OH	L 13–27		
November 12	Muskingum	Alliance, OH	L 6–40		
*Non-conference game

=== Kenyon ===
1955 Kenyon Lords football
- Conference: Ohio Athletic Conference
- Record: 0–7 (0–4 OAC)
- Head coach: William C. Stiles (3rd season)

The 1955 Kenyon Lords football team represented Kenyon College of Gambier, Ohio. In their third year under head coach William C. Stiles, the Lords compiled a 0–7 record (0–4 against OAC opponents), finished in a three-way tie for last place in the OAC, and were outscored by a total of 207 to 19.

Date	Opponent	Site	Result	Attendance	Source
September 24	Ashland	Gambier, OH	L 7–14		
October 1	at Wooster	Wooster, OH	L 0–27		
October 8	Denison	Gambier, OH	L 6–34		
October 15	at Hobart*	Geneva, NY	L 0–53		
October 22	at Capital	Columbus, OH	L 6–46		
October 29	Hamilton*	Gambier, OH	L 0–6		
November 5	Hiram	Gambier, OH	L 0–27		
*Non-conference game

=== Marietta ===
1955 Marietta Pioneers football
- Conference: Ohio Athletic Conference
- Record: 0–8 (0–5 OAC)
- Head coach: John R. Smith (4th season)

The 1955 Marietta Pioneers football team represented the Marietta College of Marietta, Ohio. In their fourth year under head coach John R. Smith, the Pioneers compiled a 0–8 record (0–5 against OAC opponents), finished in a three-way tie for last place in the OAC, and were outscored by a total of 243 to 40.

Date	Opponent	Site	Result	Attendance	Source
September 24	at Muskingum	Zanesville, OH	L 0–53		
October 1	at Wittenberg	Springfield, OH	L 13–44		
October 8	Capital	Marietta, OH	L 0–37		
October 13	at Otterbein	Memorial Stadium; Westerville, OH	L 7–12		
October 15	at Hiram	Hiram, OH	L 0–32		
October 29	Ohio Northern*	Marietta, OH	L 0–19		
November 5	Bethany (WV)*	Marietta, OH	L 13–27		
November 12	at Wilmington*	Wilmington, OH	L 7–19		
*Non-conference game

=== Oberlin ===
1955 Oberlin Yeomen football
- Conference: Ohio Athletic Conference
- Record: 0–8 (0–5 OAC)
- Head coach: Lysle K. Butler (26th season)

The 1955 Oberlin Yeomen football team represented Oberlin College of Oberlin, Ohio. In their 26th season under head coach Lysle K. Butler, the Cardinals compiled a 0–8 record (0–5 against OAC opponents) and finished in a three-way tie for last place in the OAC.

Date	Opponent	Site	Result	Attendance	Source
October 1	Otterbein	Oberlin, OH	L 14–19		
October 8	at DePauw*	Greencastle, IN	L 13–41	4,000	
October 15	Allegheny*	Oberlin, OH	L 25–33		
October 22	Ohio Wesleyan	Oberlin, OH	L 14–20		
October 29	Rochester*		L 7–20		
November 5	at Akron	Rubber Bowl; Akron, OH	L 13–46		
November 12	Denison	Oberlin, OH	L 20–27		
November 19	at Wooster	Wooster, OH	L 6–47		
*Non-conference game

== All-conference team ==
The following players received honors on the All-Ohio Conference football teams:

- Ends: Rudy Visnich, Muskingum (INS-1); Fritz Stafford, Capital (INS-1)
- Tackles: Howard Collins, Muskingum (INS-1); Bill Wagner, Denison (INS-1)
- Guards: Mario Russo, Akron (INS-1); Jerry Zimmerman, Heidelberg (INS-1)
- Center: Curt Rehfuss, Mount Union (INS-1); Jack Lofstrom, Muskingum (INS-2)
- Quarterback: Joe McDaniel, Muskingum (INS-1); Dick Zahn, Hiram (INS-2)
- Backs: Walt Livingston, Heidelberg (INS-1); Dick Jacobs, Wooster (INS-1); Roy King, Heidelberg (INS-1); Tom Dingle, Wooster (INS-2); Gene Urbanski, Wittenberg (INS-2); Ben Kimbrough, Akron (INS-2)
