= 1960 Muskingum Fighting Muskies football team =

American college football season

1960 Muskingum Fighting Muskies football

OAC champion
- Conference: Ohio Athletic Conference
- Record: 9–0 (7–0 OAC)
- Head coach: Ed Sherman (16th season)
- Home stadium: McConagha Stadium

1960 Ohio Athletic Conference football standings
	Conf.					Overall
Team	W		L		T	W		L		T
No. 9 Muskingum $	7	–	0	–	0	9	–	0	–	0
Ohio Wesleyan	6	–	1	–	0	7	–	2	–	0
Otterbein	5	–	1	–	0	8	–	1	–	0
Wittenberg	5	–	1	–	0	8	–	1	–	0
Wooster	5	–	3	–	0	6	–	3	–	0
Denison	4	–	3	–	0	6	–	3	–	0
Marietta	4	–	3	–	0	6	–	3	–	0
Heidelberg	3	–	3	–	0	5	–	4	–	0
Mount Union	3	–	5	–	0	3	–	6	–	0
Oberlin	2	–	4	–	0	4	–	4	–	0
Capital	2	–	6	–	0	2	–	6	–	0
Kenyon	1	–	6	–	0	2	–	6	–	0
Akron	1	–	6	–	0	1	–	8	–	0
Hiram	0	–	6	–	0	0	–	7	–	1
$ – Conference champion; Rankings from AP small college poll

The 1960 Muskingum Fighting Muskies football team was an American football team that represented Muskingum University of New Concord, Ohio, as a member of the Ohio Athletic Conference (OAC) during the 1960 college football season. In their 16th season under head coach Ed Sherman, the Fighting Muskies compiled a perfect 9–0 record (7–0 against OAC opponents), won the OAC championship, and outscored opponents by a total of 425 to 39.

The 1960 season was one of four perfect seasons in Muskingum football history, along with 1926, 1931, and 1955. The delta of 386 points between points scored and points allowed during the 1960 season was the largest in Muskingum football history.

The team played its home games at McConagha Stadium in New Concord, Ohio.

== Schedule ==
Date	Opponent	Rank	Site	Result	Attendance	Source
September 24	Marietta		McConagha Stadium; New Concord, OH	W 64–6		
October 1	Wittenberg		McConagha Stadium; New Concord, OH	W 36–0		
October 8	at Denison	No. 9	Deeds Stadium; Granville, OH	W 35–14	4,760	
October 15	at Hope*	No. 9	Holland, MI	W 47–0		
October 22	at Heidelberg		Tiffin, OH	W 38–6		
October 29	Akron		McConagha Stadium; New Concord, OH	W 58–0	6,500	
November 5	Waynesburg*	No. 10	McConagha Stadium; New Concord, OH	W 66–7		
November 12	Wooster	No. 10	McConagha Stadium; New Concord, OH	W 35–6		
November 19	at Mount Union	No. 10	Alliance, OH	W 46–0		
*Non-conference game; Rankings from AP Poll released prior to the game
