= 1961 Muskingum Fighting Muskies football team =

American college football season

1961 Muskingum Fighting Muskies football
- Conference: Ohio Athletic Conference
- Record: 7–2 (5–1 OAC)
- Head coach: Ed Sherman (17th season)
- Home stadium: McConagha Stadium

1961 Ohio Athletic Conference football standings
	Conf.					Overall
Team	W		L		T	W		L		T
Wittenberg $	6	–	0	–	0	8	–	1	–	0
Akron	6	–	1	–	0	6	–	2	–	0
Otterbein	5	–	1	–	0	8	–	1	–	0
Muskingum	5	–	1	–	0	7	–	2	–	0
Capital	5	–	2	–	1	5	–	2	–	1
Wooster	5	–	3	–	0	6	–	3	–	0
Ohio Wesleyan	4	–	3	–	0	6	–	3	–	0
Kenyon	2	–	4	–	0	3	–	4	–	1
Mount Union	2	–	5	–	0	3	–	6	–	0
Denison	2	–	6	–	0	3	–	6	–	0
Heidelberg	1	–	4	–	1	1	–	7	–	1
Oberlin	1	–	5	–	0	2	–	5	–	1
Hiram	1	–	5	–	0	1	–	7	–	0
Marietta	0	–	5	–	1	0	–	8	–	1
$ – Conference champion

The 1961 Muskingum Fighting Muskies football team was an American football team that represented Muskingum University of New Concord, Ohio, during the 1961 Ohio Athletic Conference (OAC) football season. In their 17th season under head coach Ed Sherman, the Fighting Muskies compiled a 7–2 record (5–1 against OAC opponents) and finished in a tie for third place in the OAC.

Sherman achieved his 100th career win on October 21 against Heidelberg and was carried off the field.

Muskingum in the fall of 1961 had a total attendance of 1,295 students, including 692 men.

== Schedule ==
Date	Time	Opponent	Site	Result	Attendance	Source
September 23		at Marietta	Marietta, OH	W 14–0		
September 30	8:00 p.m.	at Baldwin–Wallace*	Berea, OH	L 6–35	8,500	
October 7		Denison	New Concord, OH	W 13–7		
October 14		Mount Union	New Concord, OH	W 36–0		
October 21		Heidelberg^{†}	McConagha Stadium; New Concord, OH	W 23–0	3,200	
October 28		at West Chester*	West Chester, PA	W 19–16	9,000	
November 4		at Akron	Rubber Bowl; Akron, OH	L 14–35	6,511	
November 11		at Wooster	Wooster, OH	W 6–0		
November 18		Findlay*	New Concord, OH	W 32–0		
*Non-conference game; ^{†}Homecoming; All times are in Eastern time
