= 1954 Akron Zips football team =

American college football season

1954 Akron Zips football
- Conference: Ohio Athletic Conference
- Record: 3–5 (3–4 OAC)
- Head coach: Joe McMullen (1st season)
- Captains: John Cistone; Mario Rossi
- Home stadium: Rubber Bowl

1954 Ohio Athletic Conference football standings
	Conf.					Overall
Team	W		L		T	W		L		T
Heidelberg $	5	–	0	–	1	7	–	1	–	1
Muskingum	5	–	1	–	1	6	–	2	–	1
Denison	5	–	2	–	0	6	–	2	–	1
Ohio Wesleyan	4	–	2	–	0	7	–	2	–	0
Capital	4	–	2	–	0	6	–	2	–	0
Wooster	4	–	3	–	0	6	–	3	–	0
Wittenberg	4	–	4	–	0	4	–	5	–	0
Akron	3	–	4	–	0	3	–	5	–	0
Oberlin	2	–	3	–	0	2	–	5	–	1
Otterbein	2	–	4	–	0	2	–	6	–	0
Marietta	1	–	3	–	1	4	–	3	–	1
Hiram	1	–	3	–	1	2	–	4	–	1
Mount Union	1	–	6	–	0	2	–	7	–	0
Kenyon	0	–	4	–	0	0	–	7	–	0
$ – Conference champion

The 1954 Akron Zips football team was an American football team that represented the University of Akron in the Ohio Athletic Conference (OAC) during the 1954 college football season. In its first season under head coach Joe McMullen, the team compiled a 3–5 record (3-4 against OAC opponents). John Cistone and Mario Rossi were the team captains. The team played its home games at the Rubber Bowl in Akron, Ohio.

== Schedule ==
Date	Opponent	Site	Result	Attendance	Source
September 25	Wittenberg	Rubber Bowl; Akron, OH	L 7–12	23,769	
October 2	at Ohio Wesleyan	Delaware, OH	W 30–27		
October 9	Otterbein	Rubber Bowl; Akron, OH	W 27–0	5,337	
October 16	at Mount Union	Alliance, OH	W 19–0		
October 23	at Denison	Granville, OH	L 26–35		
October 30	Wooster	Rubber Bowl; Akron, OH	L 27–28		
November 6	Kent State*	Rubber Bowl; Akron, OH (Wagon Wheel)	L 18–58		
November 13	Heidelberg	Rubber Bowl; Akron, OH	L 15–53		
*Non-conference game
