= 1959 Akron Zips football team =

American college football season

1959 Akron Zips football
- Conference: Ohio Athletic Conference
- Record: 4–5 (4–3 OAC)
- Head coach: Joe McMullen (6th season)
- Captain: Gino Calcei
- Home stadium: Rubber Bowl

1959 Ohio Athletic Conference football standings
	Conf.					Overall
Team	W		L		T	W		L		T
Wooster +	5	–	1	–	0	7	–	1	–	1
Heidelberg +	5	–	1	–	0	7	–	2	–	0
Ohio Wesleyan	4	–	1	–	1	7	–	1	–	1
Muskingum	6	–	2	–	0	7	–	2	–	0
Otterbein	5	–	2	–	0	7	–	2	–	0
Wittenberg	5	–	3	–	0	5	–	3	–	0
Akron	4	–	3	–	0	4	–	5	–	0
Capital	4	–	4	–	0	4	–	4	–	0
Marietta	3	–	3	–	0	5	–	4	–	0
Oberlin	2	–	4	–	0	4	–	4	–	0
Mount Union	2	–	6	–	0	2	–	7	–	0
Denison	1	–	5	–	1	2	–	5	–	2
Kenyon	1	–	6	–	0	1	–	6	–	0
Hiram	0	–	6	–	0	0	–	8	–	0
+ – Conference co-champions

The 1959 Akron Zips football team represented Akron University in the 1959 college football season as a member of the Ohio Athletic Conference. Led by sixth-year head coach Joe McMullen, the Zips played their home games at the Rubber Bowl in Akron, Ohio. They finished the season with a record of 4–5 overall and 4–3 in OAC play. They were outscored by their opponents 119–155.

== Schedule ==
Date	Opponent	Site	Result
September 19	at Mount Union	Mount Union Stadium; Alliance, OH	W 29–23
September 26	Muskingum	Rubber Bowl; Akron, OH	W 6–0
October 3	vs. Ohio Wesleyan	Barberton, OH	L 8–16
October 10	at Heidelberg	Tiffin, OH	W 20–14
October 17	at Wooster	Wooster, OH	L 14–15
October 31	at Baldwin–Wallace*	Berea, OH	L 0–6
November 7	Denison	Rubber Bowl; Akron, OH	W 28–14
November 14	at Wittenberg	Wittenberg Stadium; Springfield, OH	L 0–35
November 19	Youngstown State*	Rubber Bowl; Akron, OH (Steel Tire)	L 14–34
*Non-conference game
