= Jack Landrum =

American football coach (1908–1989)

Biographical details
- Born: June 9, 1908; Centerburg, Ohio, U.S.
- Died: September 16, 1989 (aged 81); Hessel, Michigan, U.S.
- Education: Capital University (1934)

Playing career

Football
- 1927: Ohio State
- 1931–1933: Capital

Track and field
- 1931–1933: Capital
- Position: Center

Coaching career (HC unless noted)

Football
- 1934–1937: Circleville HS (OH)
- 1938–1950: Columbus East HS (OH) (line)
- 1951–1960: Capital
- 1961–1968: Capital (interior line)

Track and field
- 1938–1950: Columbus East HS (OH)
- 1951–1970: Capital

Administrative career (AD unless noted)
- 1935–1937: Circleville HS (OH)

Head coaching record
- Overall: 43–32–3 (college football)

Accomplishments and honors

Awards
- 2× Second-Team All-OAC (1932–1933); Capital Hall of Fame (1978)

John F. Landrum (June 9, 1908 – September 16, 1989) was an American college football coach. He was the head football coach for Capital University from 1951 to 1960.

== Playing career ==
Landrum attended Junction City High School before playing a prep year for Culver Military Academy. He played college football for one year in 1927 for Ohio State. After a three-year hiatus he enrolled at Capital and was a member of the football and track and field team. As a center for the football team he earned back-to-back Ohio Athletic Conference (OAC) honors in 1932 and 1933.

== Coaching career ==
After Landrum's graduation he was hired as the head football coach for Circleville High School. After four years as head coach he was hired as the line coach for Columbus East High School. In 1951, he was hired as the head football coach for Capital. In ten seasons as head coach he led the team to a 43–32–3 record and only had two losing seasons throughout his tenure. He resigned following the 1960 season. He remained on the staff as the interior line coach under his successor Gene Slaughter. He was relieved from that position after the 1968 season.

While with Columbus East and Capital, Landrum served as the head track and field coach. He served as the coach for Capital until 1970.

Landrum was the athletic director for Circleville from 1935 to 1937.

For four decades Landrum served as an official for both high school football and basketball throughout Ohio. In 1967, he retired from officiating.

== Honors and death ==
Landrum was inducted into the Capital Hall of Fame in 1978.

Landrum died on September 16, 1989, in Hessel, Michigan.

== Head coaching record ==
=== College football ===
Year	Team	Overall	Conference	Standing	Bowl/playoffs
Capital Crusaders (Ohio Athletic Conference) (1951–1960)
1951	Capital	2–4–1	0–2–1	11th	
1952	Capital	4–4	2–3	T–8th	
1953	Capital	5–3	3–2	6th	
1954	Capital	6–2	4–2	T–4th	
1955	Capital	5–3	4–3	6th	
1956	Capital	5–2–1	4–2–1	6th	
1957	Capital	6–1–1	5–1–1	T–3rd	
1958	Capital	4–3–1	4–3–1	5th	
1959	Capital	4–4	4–4	8th	
1960	Capital	2–6	2–6	11th	
Capital:		43–32–3	32–28–3		
Total:		43–32–3			
