= Philip L. Shipe =

American football coach

Biographical details
- Born: November 30, 1910; Philadelphia, Pennsylvania, U.S.
- Died: January 3, 1996 (aged 85); Wooster, Ohio, U.S.
- Education: Ohio Northern University (1934); University of Pennsylvania

Playing career

Football
- 1930–1933: Ohio Northern
- Position: Lineman

Coaching career (HC unless noted)

Football
- 1937: Fulton HS (OH) (assistant)
- 1938–1940: Ada HS (OH)
- 1941–?: Defiance HS (OH)
- ?–1948: Defiance HS (OH)
- 1949–1965: Wooster

Basketball
- 1941–?: Defiance HS (OH)
- ?–1949: Defiance HS (OH)

Track and field
- 1938–1941: Ada HS (OH) (assistant)

Administrative career (AD unless noted)
- 1938–1941: Ada HS (OH)

Head coaching record
- Overall: 84–61–6 (college); 35–11 (high school; Defiance)

Philip Leister Shipe (November 30, 1910 – January 3, 1996) was an American college football coach. He was the head football coach for Ada High School from 1938 to 1940, Defiance High School between 1941 and 1948, and the College of Wooster from 1949 to 1965. He played college football for Ohio Northern as a lineman.

== Head coaching record ==
=== College ===
Year	Team	Overall	Conference	Standing	Bowl/playoffs
Wooster Fighting Scots (Ohio Athletic Conference) (1949–1965)
1949	Wooster	5–3–1	4–3–1	6th	
1950	Wooster	1–6–1	0–6	T–12th	
1951	Wooster	6–3	2–3	8th	
1952	Wooster	7–1–1	4–1–1	2nd	
1953	Wooster	5–3	3–3	7th	
1954	Wooster	6–3	4–3	6th	
1955	Wooster	7–2	5–2	4th	
1956	Wooster	5–3–1	4–3–1	7th	
1957	Wooster	3–6	2–6	T–11th	
1958	Wooster	6–3	4–2	4th	
1959	Wooster	7–1–1	5–1	T–1st	
1960	Wooster	6–3	5–3	5th	
1961	Wooster	6–3	5–3	6th	
1962	Wooster	4–4–1	3–4	9th	
1963	Wooster	1–8	1–6	14th	
1964	Wooster	5–4	3–4	9th	
1965	Wooster	4–5	3–4	T–8th	
Wooster:		84–61–6	57–57–3		
Total:		84–61–6			
National championship Conference title Conference division title or championship game berth
