= 1961 Otterbein Cardinals football team =

American college football season

1961 Otterbein Cardinals football
- Conference: Ohio Athletic Conference
- Record: 8–1 (5–1 OAC)
- Head coach: Bob Agler (7th season)
- Home stadium: Memorial Stadium

1961 Ohio Athletic Conference football standings
	Conf.					Overall
Team	W		L		T	W		L		T
Wittenberg $	6	–	0	–	0	8	–	1	–	0
Akron	6	–	1	–	0	6	–	2	–	0
Otterbein	5	–	1	–	0	8	–	1	–	0
Muskingum	5	–	1	–	0	7	–	2	–	0
Capital	5	–	2	–	1	5	–	2	–	1
Wooster	5	–	3	–	0	6	–	3	–	0
Ohio Wesleyan	4	–	3	–	0	6	–	3	–	0
Kenyon	2	–	4	–	0	3	–	4	–	1
Mount Union	2	–	5	–	0	3	–	6	–	0
Denison	2	–	6	–	0	3	–	6	–	0
Heidelberg	1	–	4	–	1	1	–	7	–	1
Oberlin	1	–	5	–	0	2	–	5	–	1
Hiram	1	–	5	–	0	1	–	7	–	0
Marietta	0	–	5	–	1	0	–	8	–	1
$ – Conference champion

The 1961 Otterbein Cardinals football team was an American football team that represented Otterbein University of Westerville, Ohio, during the 1961 Ohio Athletic Conference (OAC) football season. In their seventh season under head coach Bob Agler, the Cardinals compiled a 8–1 record (5–1 against OAC opponents) and finished in a tie for third place in the OAC.

Jack Pietila was selected as a first-team player at guard on the 1961 all-OAC offensive team.

== Schedule ==
Date	Opponent	Site	Result	Attendance	Source
September 23	Findlay*	Westerville, OH	W 20–6	2,800	
September 30	at Heidelberg	Tiffin, OH	W 14–7	2,950–3,200	
October 7	at Kenyon	Gambier, OH	W 35–0	700	
October 14	Oberlin	Westerville, OH	W 28–7	4,000	
October 21	at Hiram	Hiram, OH	W 31–7	1,850	
October 28	Marietta	Westerville, OH	W 10–8	6,000	
November 4	Ashland*	Westerville, OH	W 15–13	2,000	
November 11	Capital	Westerville, OH	L 17–23	6,500	
November 18	at Centre*	500; Danville, KY	W 50–14	500	
*Non-conference game
