= Gene Slaughter =

American football coach (1926–1998)

Biographical details
- Born: May 18, 1926; Ironton, Ohio, U.S.
- Died: June 22, 1998 (aged 72); Columbus, Ohio, U.S.
- Education: Capital University (1950); Marshall College (1956)

Playing career

Football
- 1946–1949: Capital
- Positions: Center, linebacker

Coaching career (HC unless noted)

Football
- 1950–1951: South Point HS (OH)
- 1952–1956: Jackson HS (OH)
- 1957–1959: Warren Harding HS (OH)
- 1960: Ohio State (backfield)
- 1961–1985: Capital

Tennis
- 1961–?: Capital

Administrative career (AD unless noted)
- 1957–1959: Warren HS (OH)
- 1981–1987: Capital

Head coaching record
- Overall: 120–94–3 (college football); 84–16–3 (high school football)
- Bowls: 1–0

Accomplishments and honors

Championships
- 1 OAC (1970)

Awards
- 2× OAC Coach of the Year (1964, 1970); Capital Hall of Fame (1988)

Eugene Slaughter (May 18, 1926 – June 22, 1998) was an American college football coach. He was the head football coach for Capital University from 1961 to 1985.

== Early life and playing career ==
Slaughter was born on May 18, 1926, in Ironton, Ohio. He attended Ironton High School and graduated in 1944. Following his graduation he served in the United States Navy during World War II. Following the war he enrolled at Capital and played center and linebacker for the Crusaders football team. He earned four letters as a member of the football team.

== Coaching career ==
In 1950, following Slaughter's graduation from Capital he served as the head football coach for South Point High School. In two seasons he led the team to a 16–4 record. In 1952, he was hired as the head football coach for Jackson High School. In five seasons as head coach he led the team to an overall record of 43–8–2 including a thirty-game win streak and four undefeated seasons. In 1953, he led the team to a state championship and was named Ohio's Coach of the Year. In 1957, he was hired as the head football coach for Warren Harding High School. In three seasons he led the team to a 25–4–1 record and was named Ohio's high school football coach of the year in 1957 after leading the team to a state championship. After ten years as a high school football coach he amassed an overall record of 84–16–3. In 1960, Slaughter was hired as the backfield coach for Ohio State under head coach Woody Hayes.

In 1961, Slaughter was hired as the head football coach for his alma mater, Capital, as the successor to Jack Landrum. In 26 seasons as head coach he led the team to an overall record of 120–94–3. His best season came in 1970 when he led the team to an 8–1 record and won the Amos Alonzo Stagg Bowl. He was named Ohio Athletic Conference (OAC) Coach of the Year twice; in 1964 and 1970. He retired following the 1985 season.

Slaughter also coached the Capital golf team. He also served as the athletic director for Warren Harding High School from 1957 to 1957 and for Capital from 1981 to 1987.

== Honors and death ==
In 1988, Slaughter was inducted into the Capital Hall of Fame.

Slaughter died on June 22, 1998, at the Doctors North Hospital in Columbus, Ohio, following a brief illness.

== Head coaching record ==
=== College football ===
| Year | Team | Overall | Conference | Standing | Bowl/playoffs |
|---|---|---|---|---|---|
Capital Crusaders (Ohio Athletic Conference) (1961–1985)
| 1961 | Capital | 5–2–1 | 5–2–1 | 5th | |
| 1962 | Capital | 4–4 | 4–4 | 8th | |
| 1963 | Capital | 2–6 | 2–6 | 11th | |
| 1964 | Capital | 7–1 | 7–1 | T–2nd | |
| 1965 | Capital | 6–2 | 5–2 | T–4th | |
| 1966 | Capital | 6–2 | 4–2 | T–4th | |
| 1967 | Capital | 5–3 | 5–2 | 6th | |
| 1968 | Capital | 5–3 | 4–3 | 7th | |
| 1969 | Capital | 3–4–1 | 3–4 | T–9th | |
| 1970 | Capital | 8–1 | 6–0 | T–1st | W Amos Alonzo Stagg |
| 1971 | Capital | 3–6 | 2–4 | T–9th | |
| 1972 | Capital | 4–5 | 3–2 | T–2nd (Red) | |
| 1973 | Capital | 4–4 | 1–4 | 5th (Red) | |
| 1974 | Capital | 5–4 | 2–2 | 3rd (Blue) | |
| 1975 | Capital | 1–8 | 0–4 | 5th (Blue) | |
| 1976 | Capital | 5–3–1 | 2–3 | 4th (Red) | |
| 1977 | Capital | 5–4 | 2–3 | 4th (Red) | |
| 1978 | Capital | 6–3 | 3–2 | T–2nd (Blue) | |
| 1979 | Capital | 5–4 | 2–3 | 4th (Blue) | |
| 1980 | Capital | 6–3 | 4–2 | T–2nd (Blue) | |
| 1981 | Capital | 6–3 | 4–2 | T–2nd (Blue) | |
| 1982 | Capital | 5–4 | 3–2 | 3rd (Red) | |
| 1983 | Capital | 4–5 | 2–3 | T–3rd (Blue) | |
| 1984 | Capital | 5–5 | 3–5 | T–5th | |
| 1985 | Capital | 5–5 | 3–5 | T–6th | |
| Capital: | | 120–94–3 | 81–72–1 | | |
| Total: | | 120–94–3 | | | |
National championship Conference title Conference division title or championship game berth
