= Joe McMullen =

American football player, coach and administrator (1924-1983)

Biographical details
- Born: May 9, 1924
- Died: September 9, 1983 (aged 59); Towson, Maryland, U.S.

Playing career
- 1943–1944: Brown

Coaching career (HC unless noted)
- 1948: Brown (JV)
- 1949: Toledo (line)
- 1950–1951: Stetson
- 1952–1953: Washington & Jefferson
- 1954–1960: Akron
- 1965–1968: Penn State (assistant)
- 1969–1970: San Jose State

Administrative career (AD unless noted)
- 1971–1979: Marshall
- 1979–1983: Towson State

Head coaching record
- Overall: 58–46–5
- Bowls: 1–0

Joe H. McMullen (May 9, 1924 – September 9, 1983) was an American college football player, coach, and athletics administrator. He serve as the head football coach at Stetson University from 1950 to 1951, Washington & Jefferson College from 1952 to 1953, the University of Akron from 1954 to 1960, and San Jose State University from 1969 to 1970, compiling a career head coaching record of 58–46–5.

McMullen coached as an assistant at Pennsylvania State University from 1965 to 1968 before being named head coach at San Jose State. Following his stint at San Jose State, he was hired as the athletic director at Marshall University in 1971. He stayed at Marshall until 1979, when he was hired as athletic director at Towson State University—now known as Towson University. McMullen died on September 9, 1983, from leukemia at the age of 59.

== Head coaching record ==
Year	Team	Overall	Conference	Standing	Bowl/playoffs
Stetson Hatters (Independent) (1950–1951)
1950	Stetson	8–2			
1951	Stetson	8–1–2			W Tangerine
Stetson:		16–3–2			
Washington & Jefferson Presidents (Independent) (1952–1953)
1952	Washington & Jefferson	5–1			
1953	Washington & Jefferson	4–4			
Washington & Jefferson:		9–5			
Akron Zips (Ohio Athletic Conference) (1954–1960)
1954	Akron	3–5	3–4	8th	
1955	Akron	6–2	6–2	3rd	
1956	Akron	3–5–1	3–5–1	9th	
1957	Akron	7–1–1	5–1–1	T–3rd	
1958	Akron	6–2–1	6–2	3rd	
1959	Akron	4–5	4–3	7th	
1960	Akron	1–8	1–6	T–12th	
Akron:		30–28–3	28–23–2		
San Jose State Spartans (Pacific Coast Athletic Association) (1969–1970)
1969	San Jose State	2–8	1–1	T–3rd	
1970	San Jose State	1–2 (Note: Dewey King coached the final eight games of the season, leading the Spartans to a record of 1–7 with a 1–3 mark in conference play. San Jose State finished the season tied for fourth place in the Pacific Coast Athletic Association.)	1–0		
San Jose State:		3–10	2–1		
Total:		58–46–5			
