= 1961 Akron Zips football team =

American college football season

1961 Akron Zips football
- Conference: Ohio Athletic Conference
- Record: 6–2 (6–1 OAC)
- Head coach: Gordon K. Larson (1st season)
- Captain: Jim Lupori
- Home stadium: Rubber Bowl

1961 Ohio Athletic Conference football standings
	Conf.					Overall
Team	W		L		T	W		L		T
Wittenberg $	6	–	0	–	0	8	–	1	–	0
Akron	6	–	1	–	0	6	–	2	–	0
Otterbein	5	–	1	–	0	8	–	1	–	0
Muskingum	5	–	1	–	0	7	–	2	–	0
Capital	5	–	2	–	1	5	–	2	–	1
Wooster	5	–	3	–	0	6	–	3	–	0
Ohio Wesleyan	4	–	3	–	0	6	–	3	–	0
Kenyon	2	–	4	–	0	3	–	4	–	1
Mount Union	2	–	5	–	0	3	–	6	–	0
Denison	2	–	6	–	0	3	–	6	–	0
Heidelberg	1	–	4	–	1	1	–	7	–	1
Oberlin	1	–	5	–	0	2	–	5	–	1
Hiram	1	–	5	–	0	1	–	7	–	0
Marietta	0	–	5	–	1	0	–	8	–	1
$ – Conference champion

The 1961 Akron Zips football team was an American football team that represented Akron University in the 1961 Ohio Athletic Conference (OAC) football season. In their first year under head coach Gordon K. Larson, the Zips compiled a 6–2 record (6–1 against OAC opponents), finished in second place in the OAC, and outscored opponents by a total of 185 to 57.

Several Akron players were selected as first-team players on the 1961 All-OAC football team, including: fullback George Deo; linebacker Tom Lowry; safety Ed Lopeman; tackle Ron Ulrich; and end Ray Greene.

The team played its home games at the Rubber Bowl in Akron, Ohio.

== Schedule ==
Date	Opponent	Site	Result	Attendance	Source
September 23	at Wittenberg	Wittenberg Stadium; Springfield, OH	L 0–7	5,100–5,600	
September 30	Denison	Rubber Bowl; Akron, OH	W 28–0	35,061	
October 7	vs. Ohio Wesleyan	Barberton Stadium; Barberton, OH	W 32–21	4,500	
October 14	at Heidelberg	Tiffin, OH	W 12–0	4,000	
October 21	at Wooster	Wooster, OH	W 31–8	4,700	
October 28	vs. No. 3 Baldwin–Wallace*	Clifford Stadium; Cuyahoga Falls, OH	L 0–7	6,513–6,531	
November 4	Muskingum	Rubber Bowl; Akron, OH	W 35–14	6,511	
November 18	at Mount Union	Mount Union Stadium; Alliance, OH	W 47–0	3,500	
*Non-conference game; Rankings from AP Poll released prior to the game
