= 1961 Ohio Wesleyan Battling Bishops football team =

American college football season

1961 Ohio Wesleyan Battling Bishops football
- Conference: Ohio Athletic Conference
- Record: 6–3 (4–3 OAC)
- Head coach: Glenn Fraser (16th season)

1961 Ohio Athletic Conference football standings
	Conf.					Overall
Team	W		L		T	W		L		T
Wittenberg $	6	–	0	–	0	8	–	1	–	0
Akron	6	–	1	–	0	6	–	2	–	0
Otterbein	5	–	1	–	0	8	–	1	–	0
Muskingum	5	–	1	–	0	7	–	2	–	0
Capital	5	–	2	–	1	5	–	2	–	1
Wooster	5	–	3	–	0	6	–	3	–	0
Ohio Wesleyan	4	–	3	–	0	6	–	3	–	0
Kenyon	2	–	4	–	0	3	–	4	–	1
Mount Union	2	–	5	–	0	3	–	6	–	0
Denison	2	–	6	–	0	3	–	6	–	0
Heidelberg	1	–	4	–	1	1	–	7	–	1
Oberlin	1	–	5	–	0	2	–	5	–	1
Hiram	1	–	5	–	0	1	–	7	–	0
Marietta	0	–	5	–	1	0	–	8	–	1
$ – Conference champion

The 1961 Ohio Wesleyan Battling Bishops football team was an American football team that represented Wittenberg University of Delaware, Ohio, during the 1961 Ohio Athletic Conference (OAC) football season. In their 16th year under head coach Glenn Fraser, the Battling Bishops compiled a 6–3 record (4–3 against OAC opponents), finished in seventh place in the OAC, and outscored opponents by a total of 166 to 139.

== Schedule ==
Date	Opponent	Site	Result	Attendance	Source
September 23	Kalamazoo*	Delaware, OH	W 32–6		
September 30	Capital	Delaware, OH	W 27–21		
October 7	vs. Akron	Barberton Stadium; Barberton, OH	L 21–32	4,500	
October 14	Hiram	Delaware, OH	W 29–0		
October 21	at Oberlin	Oberlin, OH	W 20–10		
October 28	Wabash*	Delaware, OH	W 13–7		
November 4	at Wooster	Wooster, OH	L 9–22		
November 11	Wittenberg	Delaware, OH	L 7–41	6,632	
November 18	at Denison	Granville, OH	W 8–0		
*Non-conference game
