= 1961 Wittenberg Tigers football team =

American college football season

1961 Wittenberg Tigers football

OAC champion
- Conference: Ohio Athletic Conference
- Record: 8–1 (6–0 OAC)
- Head coach: Bill Edwards (7th season)
- Home stadium: Wittenberg Stadium

1961 Ohio Athletic Conference football standings
	Conf.					Overall
Team	W		L		T	W		L		T
Wittenberg $	6	–	0	–	0	8	–	1	–	0
Akron	6	–	1	–	0	6	–	2	–	0
Otterbein	5	–	1	–	0	8	–	1	–	0
Muskingum	5	–	1	–	0	7	–	2	–	0
Capital	5	–	2	–	1	5	–	2	–	1
Wooster	5	–	3	–	0	6	–	3	–	0
Ohio Wesleyan	4	–	3	–	0	6	–	3	–	0
Kenyon	2	–	4	–	0	3	–	4	–	1
Mount Union	2	–	5	–	0	3	–	6	–	0
Denison	2	–	6	–	0	3	–	6	–	0
Heidelberg	1	–	4	–	1	1	–	7	–	1
Oberlin	1	–	5	–	0	2	–	5	–	1
Hiram	1	–	5	–	0	1	–	7	–	0
Marietta	0	–	5	–	1	0	–	8	–	1
$ – Conference champion

The 1961 Wittenberg Tigers football team was an American football team that represented Wittenberg University of Springfield, Ohio, during the 1961 Ohio Athletic Conference (OAC) football season. In their seventh year under head coach Bill Edwards, the Tigers compiled an 8–1 record (6–0 against OAC opponents), won the OAC championship, and outscored opponents by a total of 324 to 47.

Four Wittenberg players were selected as first-team players on the 1961 All-Ohio Conference football team: quarterback Gary Tranquill; defensive end and kicker Bill Carpenter; tackle Don Hunt; and safety Steve Heinzen.

== Schedule ==
Date	Opponent	Site	Result	Attendance	Source
September 23	Akron	Wittenberg Stadium; Springfield, OH	W 7–0	5,100–5,600	
September 30	at Alma*	Alma, MI	W 43–0	750	
October 7	at Heidelberg	Tiffin, OH	W 28–6	2,500–3,500	
October 14	Marietta^{†}	Wittenberg Stadium; Springfield, OH	W 52–0	5,100	
October 21	at Capital	Columbus, OH	W 36–0	4,500	
October 28	Lenoir Rhyne*	Wittenberg Stadium; Springield, OH	L 14–34	4,900	
November 4	Denison	Wittenberg Stadium; Springfield, OH	W 26–0	5,200	
November 11	at Ohio Wesleyan	Delaware, OH	W 41–7	6,632	
November 18	Wayne State*	Wittenberg Stadium; Springfield, OH	W 77–0	4,200	
*Non-conference game; ^{†}Homecoming
