= 1961 Wooster Fighting Scots football team =

American college football season

1961 Wooster Fighting Scots football
- Conference: Ohio Athletic Conference
- Record: 6–3 (5–3 OAC)
- Head coach: Philip L. Shipe (13th season)

1961 Ohio Athletic Conference football standings
	Conf.					Overall
Team	W		L		T	W		L		T
Wittenberg $	6	–	0	–	0	8	–	1	–	0
Akron	6	–	1	–	0	6	–	2	–	0
Otterbein	5	–	1	–	0	8	–	1	–	0
Muskingum	5	–	1	–	0	7	–	2	–	0
Capital	5	–	2	–	1	5	–	2	–	1
Wooster	5	–	3	–	0	6	–	3	–	0
Ohio Wesleyan	4	–	3	–	0	6	–	3	–	0
Kenyon	2	–	4	–	0	3	–	4	–	1
Mount Union	2	–	5	–	0	3	–	6	–	0
Denison	2	–	6	–	0	3	–	6	–	0
Heidelberg	1	–	4	–	1	1	–	7	–	1
Oberlin	1	–	5	–	0	2	–	5	–	1
Hiram	1	–	5	–	0	1	–	7	–	0
Marietta	0	–	5	–	1	0	–	8	–	1
$ – Conference champion

The 1961 Wooster Fighting Scots football team was an American football team that represented the College of Wooster of Wooster, Ohio, during the 1961 Ohio Athletic Conference (OAC) football season. In their 13th year under head coach Philip L. Shipe, the Fighting Scots compiled a 6–3 record (5–3 against OAC opponents), finished in sixth place in the OAC, and were outscored opponents by a total of 148 to 75.

== Schedule ==
Date	Opponent	Site	Result	Attendance	Source
September 23	at Ashland*	Redwood Stadium; Ashland, OH	W 28–6		
September 30	Kenyon	Wooster, OH	W 41–0		
October 7	at Mount Union	Alliance, OH	W 16–6	1,500	
October 14	at Denison	Deeds Field; Granville, OH	W 3–0	2,368	
October 21	Akron	Wooster, OH	L 8–31	4,700	
October 28	at Capital	Columbus, OH	L 8–10		
November 4	Ohio Wesleyan	Wooster, OH	W 22–9		
November 11	Muskingum	Wooster, OH	L 0–6		
November 18	at Oberlin	Oberlin, OH	W 22–7		
*Non-conference game
