= Edward Chupa =

American-football player and coach (1918–2013)

Biographical details
- Born: August 2, 1918; Lucerne Mines, Pennsylvania, U.S.
- Died: October 30, 2013 (aged 95); Dallas, Texas. U.S.

Playing career
- 1937–1940: Murray State

Coaching career (HC unless noted)
- 1948–?: John Adams HS (OH) (assistant)
- 1951–1953: Hiram (assistant)
- 1954–1955: Hiram
- 1956–1959: Washington & Jefferson

Administrative career (AD unless noted)
- 1962–1970: Southern Idaho

Head coaching record
- Overall: 12–24–2

Edward Alexander Chupa (August 2, 1918 – October 30, 2013) was an American football player and coach. He served as the head football coach at Hiram College in Hiram, Ohio from 1953 to 1954 and at Washington & Jefferson College in Washington, Pennsylvania from 1956 to 1959, compiling a career college football coaching record of 12–24–2.

== Head coaching record ==
Year	Team	Overall	Conference	Standing	Bowl/playoffs
Hiram Terriers (Ohio Athletic Conference) (1954–1955)
1954	Hiram	2–4–1	1–3–1	T–11th	
1955	Hiram	5–3	3–2	5th	
Hiram:		7–7–1	4–5–1		
Washington & Jefferson Presidents (Independent) (1956–1957)
1956	Washington & Jefferson	3–4–1			
1957	Washington & Jefferson	1–6–1			
Washington & Jefferson Presidents (Presidents' Athletic Conference) (1958)
1958	Washington & Jefferson	1–7	1–4	8th	
Washington & Jefferson:		5–17–1	1–4		
Total:		12–24–2			
