= 1961 Capital Crusaders football team =

American college football season

1961 Capital Crusaders football
- Conference: Ohio Athletic Conference
- Record: 5–2–1 (5–2–1 OAC)
- Head coach: Gene Slaughter (1st season)

1961 Ohio Athletic Conference football standings
	Conf.					Overall
Team	W		L		T	W		L		T
Wittenberg $	6	–	0	–	0	8	–	1	–	0
Akron	6	–	1	–	0	6	–	2	–	0
Otterbein	5	–	1	–	0	8	–	1	–	0
Muskingum	5	–	1	–	0	7	–	2	–	0
Capital	5	–	2	–	1	5	–	2	–	1
Wooster	5	–	3	–	0	6	–	3	–	0
Ohio Wesleyan	4	–	3	–	0	6	–	3	–	0
Kenyon	2	–	4	–	0	3	–	4	–	1
Mount Union	2	–	5	–	0	3	–	6	–	0
Denison	2	–	6	–	0	3	–	6	–	0
Heidelberg	1	–	4	–	1	1	–	7	–	1
Oberlin	1	–	5	–	0	2	–	5	–	1
Hiram	1	–	5	–	0	1	–	7	–	0
Marietta	0	–	5	–	1	0	–	8	–	1
$ – Conference champion

The 1961 Capital Crusaders football team was an American football team that represented Capital University of Columbus, Ohio, during the 1961 Ohio Athletic Conference (OAC) football season. In their first season under head coach Gene Slaughter, the Crusaders compiled a 5–2–1 record (5–2–1 against OAC opponents), finished in fifth place in the OAC, and outscored opponents by a total of 137 to 94.

== Schedule ==
Date	Opponent	Site	Result	Attendance	Source
September 23	Heidelberg	Columbus, OH	T 0–0	2,500	
September 30	at Ohio Wesleyan	Delaware, OH	L 21–27		
October 7	at Hiram	Hiram, OH	W 40–0		
October 14	Kenyon	Columbus, OH	W 28–0		
October 21	Wittenberg	Columbus, OH	L 0–36	4,500	
October 28	Wooster	Columbus, OH	W 10–8		
November 4	at Marietta	Marietta, OH	W 15–6		
November 11	at Otterbein	Westerville, OH	W 23–17	6,500	
