= Bob Agler =

American football player (1924–2005)

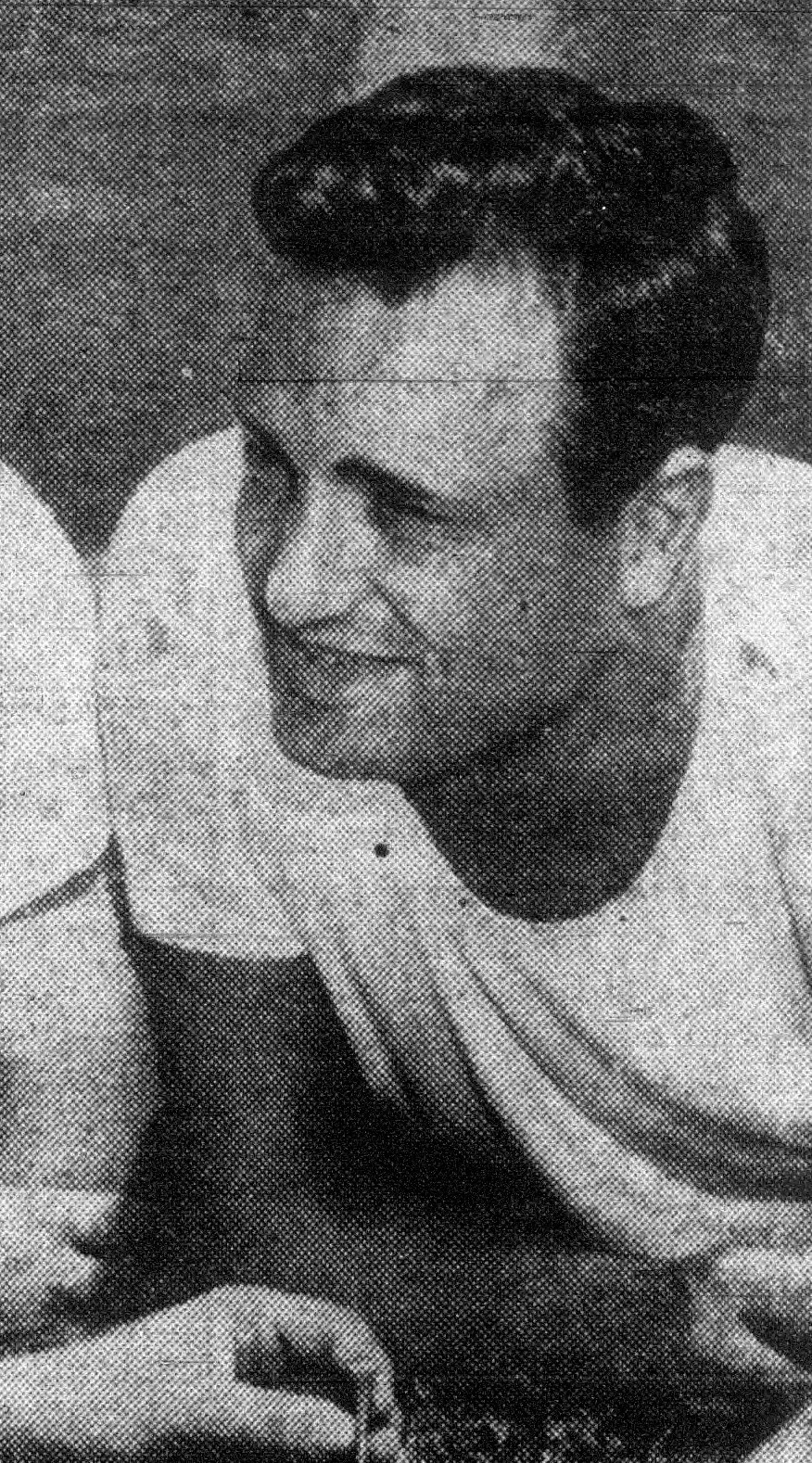
- Agler, circa 1949

No. 44
- Positions: Fullback, punter

Personal information
- Born: March 13, 1924; Columbus, Ohio, U.S.
- Died: September 16, 2005 (aged 81); Westerville, Ohio, U.S.
- Listed height: 6 ft 1 in (1.85 m)
- Listed weight: 210 lb (95 kg)

Career information
- High school: Mifflin (Columbus)
- College: Otterbein

Career history

Playing
- Los Angeles Rams (1948–1949); Calgary Stampeders (1951)

Coaching
- Johnstown HS (OH) (1952) Head coach; Otterbein (1953–1954) Assistant coach; Otterbein (1955–1965) Head coach; Otterbein (1970–1974) Head coach

Operations
- Otterbein (?–1975) Athletic director
- Stats at Pro Football Reference

Robert J. Agler (March 13, 1924 – September 16, 2005) was an American gridiron football player, coach of football and basketball, and college athletics administrator. He played professionally as a fullback and punter for the Los Angeles Rams of the National Football League (NFL) and the Calgary Stampeders of the Canadian Football League (CFL). Agler appeared in 16 games for the Rams from 1948 to 1949. With the Stampeders, Agler ran for two touchdowns and kicked 37 punts. Agler served two stints as the head football coach at his alma mater, Otterbein University in Westerville, Ohio, from 1955 to 1965 and 1970 to 1974, compiling a record of 74–63–5. He was also the head basketball coach at Otterbein from 1955 to 1958, tallying a mark of 13–39.

Agler graduated from Dublin High School in Dublin, Ohio in 1941 and then attended Otterbein, where he lettered in football, basketball, baseball, and track. In July 1952, he was hired as the head football coach at Johnstown High School in Johnstown, Ohio. The next year, he returned to Otterbein as an assistant football coach before succeeding Harry W. Ewing as the school's head football coach in 1955.

== Head coaching record ==
=== Football ===
Year	Team	Overall	Conference	Standing	Bowl/playoffs
Otterbein Cardinals (Ohio Athletic Conference) (1955–1965)
1955	Otterbein	2–5–1	2–4–1	10th	
1956	Otterbein	4–5	3–4	8th	
1957	Otterbein	5–3	4–2	T–5th	
1958	Otterbein	3–4–2	2–4–1	11th	
1959	Otterbein	7–2	5–2	5th	
1960	Otterbein	8–1	5–1	T–3rd	
1961	Otterbein	8–1	5–1	T–3rd	
1962	Otterbein	5–4	4–3	7th	
1963	Otterbein	5–3–1	4–2–1	6th	
1964	Otterbein	6–3	4–3	T–4th	
1965	Otterbein	4–5	4–3	7th	
Otterbein Cardinals (Ohio Athletic Conference) (1970–1974)
1970	Otterbein	2–7	2–5	T–10th	
1971	Otterbein	3–6	2–4	T–9th	
1972	Otterbein	2–7	1–3	T–4th (Blue)	
1973	Otterbein	4–4–1	1–2–1	4th (Blue)	
1974	Otterbein	6–3	4–1	2nd (Blue)	
Otterbein:		74–63–5	54–44–4		
Total:		74–63–5			
