= Glenn Fraser (American football) =

American football coach

Biographical details
- Born: c. 1908

Coaching career (HC unless noted)

Football
- 1937–1946: Lincoln HS (OH)
- 1947–1963: Ohio Wesleyan

Tennis
- ?–1972: Ohio Wesleyan

Administrative career (AD unless noted)
- 1962–1972: Ohio Wesleyan (assistant AD)

Head coaching record
- Overall: 92–52–8 (college football)

Accomplishments and honors

Championships
- Football; 2 OAC (1951, 1953)

Glenn M. Fraser (born c. 1908) was an American football and tennis coach, college athletics administrator, and educator. He served as the head football coach at Ohio Wesleyan University from 1947 to 1963, compiled a record of 92–52–8. Fraser resigned as head coach after the 1963 season, but continued as tennis coach and professor of physical educator. He was also appointed assistant athletic director at the same. Fraser retired as tennis coach and assistant athletic director in 1972.

Fraser graduated from the University of Minnesota. Prior to his hiring at Ohio Wesleyan in 1947, he was the head football coach at Lincoln High School in Cleveland, where he led his teams to six city championships in ten seasons.

== Head coaching record ==
=== College football ===
Year	Team	Overall	Conference	Standing	Bowl/playoffs
Ohio Wesleyan Battling Bishops (Independent) (1947)
1947	Ohio Wesleyan	6–2–1			
Ohio Wesleyan Battling Bishops (Ohio Athletic Conference) (1948–1963)
1948	Ohio Wesleyan	6–2	2–0	4th	
1949	Ohio Wesleyan	7–2	4–0	2nd	
1950	Ohio Wesleyan	5–3–1	4–0–1	2nd	
1951	Ohio Wesleyan	8–1	6–0	1st	
1952	Ohio Wesleyan	6–3	5–2	T–3rd	
1953	Ohio Wesleyan	8–0–1	7–0	1st	
1954	Ohio Wesleyan	7–2	4–2	T–4th	
1955	Ohio Wesleyan	3–4–2	1–2–2	9th	
1956	Ohio Wesleyan	1–7–1	1–4–1	T–12th	
1957	Ohio Wesleyan	4–5	3–4	8th	
1958	Ohio Wesleyan	6–3	3–3	T–6th	
1959	Ohio Wesleyan	7–1–1	4–1–1	3rd	
1960	Ohio Wesleyan	7–2	6–1	2nd	
1961	Ohio Wesleyan	6–3	4–3	7th	
1962	Ohio Wesleyan	3–6	1–6	T–14th	
1963	Ohio Wesleyan	2–6–1	0–5–1	15th	
Ohio Wesleyan:		92–52–8	55–33–6		
Total:		92–52–8			
National championship Conference title Conference division title or championship game berth
