= Ed Sherman =

American football player and coach (1912–2009)

Biographical details
- Born: July 13, 1912; Licking County, Ohio, U.S.
- Died: September 29, 2009 (aged 97); Newark, Ohio, U.S.

Playing career
- ?–1935: Muskingum
- Position: Quarterback

Coaching career (HC unless noted)
- 1939–1942: Newark HS (OH) (backfield)
- 1944: Miami (OH) (assistant)
- 1945–1966: Muskingum

Head coaching record
- Overall: 141–43–7
- Bowls: 0–2

Accomplishments and honors

Championships
- 6 OAC (1949–1950, 1955, 1960, 1965–1966)
- College Football Hall of Fame; Inducted in 1996 (profile)

Edgar A. Sherman (July 13, 1912 – September 29, 2009) was an American football player and coach. He served as the head football coach at Muskingum College from 1945 to 1966, compiling a record of 141–43–7, a winning percentage of .757. He also served as Muskingum director of athletics, and he worked as a basketball referee. His Muskingum coaching career ended after the 1966 season but he remained on the faculty through 1980. He also coached the Muskingum track team and had a record of 111–21 in dual meets. Sherman was known for his service to the National Collegiate Athletic Association (NCAA). He was the NCAA secretary-treasurer for a two-year term and chairman of a committee which established the I-A, I-AA, II, III divisions, he was on the NCAA television committee and the NCAA-NAIA joint committee. He served 22 NCAA committees. Sherman received a White House citation for contribution in athletics. In 1982, he received the Corbett Award honoring his work as a college director of athletics. In 1986 Muskingum named its football field for him. Sherman was inducted into the College Football Hall of Fame as a coach in 1996. He died on September 29, 2009.

== Head coaching record ==
Year	Team	Overall	Conference	Standing	Bowl/playoffs
Muskingum Fighting Muskies (Ohio Athletic Conference) (1945–1966)
1945	Muskingum	6–1–1	4–1–1	T–3rd	
1946	Muskingum	5–2–1	4–0–1	T–2nd	
1947	Muskingum	5–3	3–3	T–9th	
1948	Muskingum	3–4–1	3–3–1	T–7th	
1949	Muskingum	8–1	7–0	T–1st	
1950	Muskingum	7–1	6–0	1st	
1951	Muskingum	5–2–1	3–2–1	T–4th	
1952	Muskingum	6–3	5–2	T–3rd	
1953	Muskingum	3–4–1	3–3–1	T–7th	
1954	Muskingum	6–2–1	5–1–1	2nd	
1955	Muskingum	8–0	7–0	T–1st	
1956	Muskingum	5–2–1	5–2–1	T–4th	
1957	Muskingum	5–4	4–3	7th	
1958	Muskingum	8–1	6–1	2nd	
1959	Muskingum	7–2	6–2	T–3rd	
1960	Muskingum	9–0	7–0	1st	
1961	Muskingum	7–2	5–1	T–3rd	
1962	Muskingum	7–2	6–2	T–4th	
1963	Muskingum	6–3	6–2	4th	
1964	Muskingum	8–2	7–1	T–2nd	L Grantland Rice
1965	Muskingum	8–1	7–0	1st	
1966	Muskingum	9–1	6–0	1st	L Grantland Rice
Muskingum:		141–43–7	115–38–7		
Total:		141–43–7			
National championship Conference title Conference division title or championship game berth
