= Jackson High School (Jackson, Ohio) =

Location
- 500 Vaughn Street; Jackson, Ohio 45640; United States; 39°2′20″N 82°38′32″W

Information
- Type: Public high school
- School district: Jackson City School District
- NCES School ID: 390441501075
- Principal: Tyler Swackhammer
- Faculty: 31.00 (on FTE basis)
- Grades: 9-12
- Enrollment: 605 (2023-2024)
- Colors: Red and White
- Athletics conference: Frontier Athletic Conference
- Mascot: Ironman
- Team name: Ironmen/Ironladies
- Rival: Wellston High School
- Yearbook: Osky Wow
- Athletic Director: Waylon Massie
- Website: https://www.jcs.k12.oh.us/
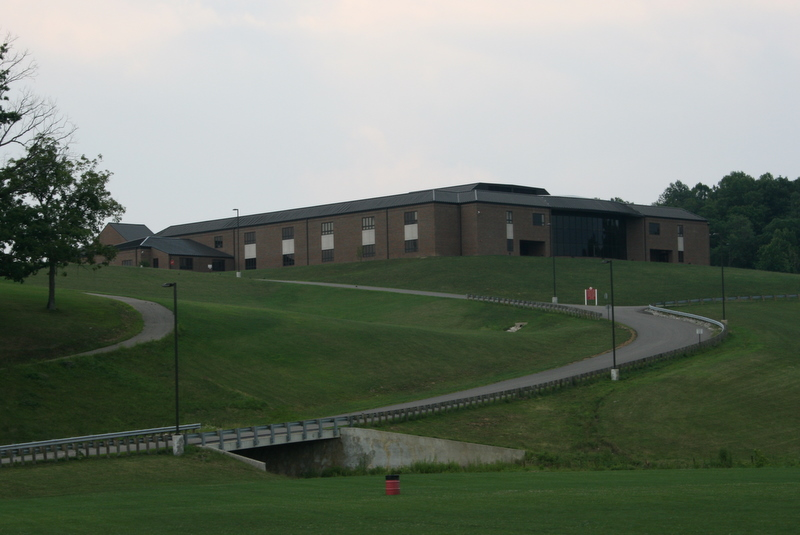
- A view of the school from SR 139

Jackson High School is a public high school in Jackson, Ohio, United States. It is the only high school in the Jackson City School District. Their mascot is the Ironman (collectively "Ironmen" or, for female teams, "Ironlady(ies)") and their school colors are crimson and grey.

== Athletics ==
The Jackson Ironmen are currently in the Frontier Athletic Conference, a new league as of the fall of 2017. They are alongside Hillsboro, Washington Courthouse, Miami Trace, Chillicothe, and Greenfield Union High Schools.

Jackson High School has a variety of sports programs including baseball, cross country, football, golf, bowling, soccer, softball, tennis, track and field, and volleyball.
