= Keith W. Piper =

American football player and coach (1921–1997)

Biographical details
- Born: October 10, 1921; Niles, Ohio, U.S.
- Died: December 9, 1997 (aged 76); On board cruise ship off Florida

Playing career
- 1940–1941: Baldwin–Wallace
- 1946–1947: Baldwin–Wallace
- Position: Center

Coaching career (HC unless noted)
- 1948–1950: Baldwin–Wallace (assistant)
- 1951–1953: Denison (line)
- 1954–1992: Denison

Head coaching record
- Overall: 201–141–18
- Tournaments: 0–1 (NCAA D-III playoffs)

Accomplishments and honors

Championships
- 1 OAC (1957); 2 NCAC (1985–1986); 1 OAC Red Division (1979)

Keith W. Piper (October 10, 1921 – December 9, 1997) was an American college football coach. He was the head football coach at Denison University from 1954 to 1992. He compiled a career record of 201–141–18. He gained national fame for perpetuating the single-wing formation decades after it had been discarded by other programs.

== Early years ==
Piper was raised in Niles, Ohio, and played football at Niles McKinley High School. He was the starting center for Niles McKinley in 1938 and 1939. He was one of the anchors on the 1939 defense that allowed only 34 points in the entire season. Niles McKinley's rival was Massillon Washington High School where coach Paul Brown (later inducted into the Pro Football Hall of Fame) ran a single-wing offense. The precision of Brown's single-wing left an imprint on him. Deception was a key element with "fakes, reverses and other sorts of razzle-dazzle." Piper later recalled, "If I could go back and watch any coach, it would be Paul Brown at Massillon. That was the ultimate in single-wing football. I remember one time they had a kid named Pokey Blunt, and he ran a reverse one time and there wasn't an opponent left standing on the field. It was fantastic. I always wanted a team that looked like that."

After graduating from high school, Piper attended Baldwin-Wallace College, in Berea, Ohio, but his education was interrupted by four years of military service in the United States Army Air Forces during World War II era, rising to the rank of staff sergeant. While in thePiper returned to Baldwin-Wallace after the war and played center in the school's single-wing offense. He also received a master's degree from Western Reserve University.

== Coaching career ==
Piper began his coaching career as an assistant football coach at Baldwin-Wallace from 1948 to 1950. In 1951, Piper became an assistant coach at Denison University in Granville, Ohio. He became Denison's head in 1954 and held the position until his retirement after the 1992 season. Piper was also an associate professor of physical education at Denison.

Piper gained fame for perpetuating the single-wing football formation "three decades after it had been discarded by just about everyone else."

When Piper instituted the single-wing at Denison in 1962, he was viewed as "bucking the tides and trends of an evolutionary sport." Piper was a student of football history who traced the formation's roots to Glenn Scobey Warner and Amos Alonzo Stagg and worked for years on a book on the history of the formation. In Piper's single-wing, the tailback was the most common recipient of the snap from center, and the quarterback was principally a blocker (or in Piper's terms, "a retarded guard"). Piper's single-wing was "predicated on deception, with the backs crossing paths, the linemen executing traps and the center disguising the target of his snap." With the criss-crossing backs and fake handoffs, one reporter noted that "the football sometimes is as hard to find as a hockey puck."

Piper stopped using the single-wing in 1966, but brought it back after Denison finished 0–8–1 in 1977. Piper believed that by being different, he would have a better chance against opponents with superior talent. Piper told a reporter in 1993, "It was not the formation itself that was so important, but that it was different from what anyone else was using." With the single-wing offense back in use, Denison went 7–2 in 1979 and won consecutive North Coast Athletic Conference championships in 1985 and 1986.

The success of the single-wing formation attracted reporters from around the country to the Denison campus. In 1982, Sports Illustrated ran a feature story on Piper which opened with an imaginary exchange between single-wing legends Knute Rockne and Glenn Warner:

"Hiya Rock, thanks for accepting the call. It's me, Glenn Warner.... But listen, the reason I called is to tell you that there's this fellow at a college in Ohio who's got his boys running the single wing.... Of course I'm sure. Denison University, 2,200 students, nice wooded place up on a hill in a little town called Granville, 30 miles east of Columbus. If you ever look down, you'll see for yourself. Fullback spinners, buck laterals, unbalanced line, the whole bit. Coach's name is Keith Piper. He's only 60, but he knows stuff from way back ..."

With Denison's single-wing rolling over opponents in 1985, the Chicago Sun-Times profiled Piper's offense noting:

"You have to go a long way to find a college football team that still uses the single-wing offense. You have to find a place with a sense of history and a certain broad-mindedness, and a coach old enough to have been schooled in the single wing who possesses the courage of convictions others consider long outdated. The place is Granville, Ohio."

The Houston Chronicle also visited Granville for a feature story on Piper that opened as follows: "The preference in this leafy little village is for things that are old. ... Piper, a Civil War buff who lives in an 1810 house furnished with antiques, has done his bit for historic preservation by outfitting the Big Red in the single wing, a pre-World War II offense that features an unbalanced line and, in the Denison version, a quarterback who never touches the ball." In 1990, The Wall Street Journal profiled Piper:

"When Keith Piper closes his eyes, he can see back to the 1920s, when he was a boy in football-mad Niles, Ohio. There, coming out of the huddle, are his heroes, the red-jersied Red Dragons of Niles McKinley High School, and they are lining up in the Single Wing formation. When Piper opens his eyes, he can see the red-jersied team he coaches, the Denison University Big Red, coming out of the huddle. They, too, are lining up in the Single Wing. ... And so the Single Wing, the formation-of-choice during football's leather-helmet era, lives on at Denison ..."

The Boston Globe ran a story on Piper's offense in 1991, noting:

"In this era of MTV and fax machines, Keith Piper is an anachronism, ... a man who lines his team up each week to play single-wing football, a formation used by Rockne, Stagg and Warner rather than Paterno, Bowden and Osborne. Almost no one plays single-wing football anymore. ... But Piper clearly is the keeper of the single-wing flame."

Piper insisted that the offense was not outdated: "The thing about the single-wing is that no one really figured out a way to stop it. It just went out of fashion. Sort of like men's clothes. There wasn't anything wrong with them. They just weren't fashionable anymore." In an interview with The Wall Street Journal, he compared the single-wing with wide ties, "The Single Wing never stopped working, you know, it just went out of style, like wide ties. Maybe it'll come back some day. I've kept some of my wide ties. I'll bet a lot of men have."

In 39 years as Denison's head coach, Piper had seven one-loss seasons (1957, 1962, 1963, 1966, 1972, 1985 and 1986), compiled a record of 201–141–18. His teams outscored opponents 7,404–5,804.

Piper won his 200th game on October 10, 1992—his 71st birthday. He retired at the end of the 1992 season. He was one of only 18 coaches to win 200 games as a head football coach at one college.

== Death ==
Piper died of congestive heart failure in 1997 while aboard a cruise ship off Florida. He was age 76 at the time of his death.

== Head coaching record ==
Year	Team	Overall	Conference	Standing	Bowl/playoffs
Denison Big Red (Ohio Athletic Conference) (1954–1993)
1954	Denison	6–2–1	5–2	3rd	
1955	Denison	4–3–2	3–3–2	T–7th	
1956	Denison	7–2	5–2	3rd	
1957	Denison	8–1	6–1	T–1st	
1958	Denison	4–5	3–5	10th	
1959	Denison	2–5–2	1–5–1	12th	
1960	Denison	6–3	4–3	T–6th	
1961	Denison	3–6	2–6	10th	
1962	Denison	7–1–1	5–1	3rd	
1963	Denison	8–1	5–1	T–2nd	
1964	Denison	6–3	3–3	T–7th	
1965	Denison	6–3	5–2	T–4th	
1966	Denison	8–1	7–1	3rd	
1967	Denison	6–3	4–3	7th	
1968	Denison	4–5	2–4	T–10th	
1969	Denison	7–2	4–2	T–4th	
1970	Denison	5–4	3–4	T–6th	
1971	Denison	5–4	4–3	6th	
1972	Denison	7–1–1	2–1–1	2nd (Blue)	
1973	Denison	3–5–1	0–3–1	5th (Blue)	
1974	Denison	3–5–1	0–3–1	5th (Blue)	
1975	Denison	5–4	3–1	2nd (Blue)	
1976	Denison	3–5	0–5	6th (Blue)	
1977	Denison	0–8–1	0–4–1	T–5th (Blue)	
1978	Denison	4–4–1	3–2	T–2nd (Red)	
1979	Denison	7–2	4–1	T–1st (Red)	
1980	Denison	4–4–1	2–3–1	5th (Blue)	
1981	Denison	3–6	1–5	T–6th (Blue)	
1982	Denison	2–5–2	1–3–1	5th (Blue)	
1983	Denison	6–2–1	3–1–1	2nd (Red)	
Denison Big Red (North Coast Athletic Conference) (1984–1992)
1984	Denison	8–2	4–2	T–2nd	
1985	Denison	10–1	6–0	1st	L NCAA Division III First Round
1986	Denison	9–1	6–0	1st	
1987	Denison	5–5	2–4	5th	
1988	Denison	3–6–1	2–4	5th	
1989	Denison	5–5	3–4	T–6th	
1990	Denison	6–4	3–4	5th	
1991	Denison	3–7	3–4	T–5th	
1992	Denison	3–5–2	2–4–2	4th	
Denison:		201–141–18	121–109–12		
Total:		201–141–18			
National championship Conference title Conference division title or championship game berth

== See also ==
- List of college football career coaching wins leaders
