= Muskingum University =

Private college in New Concord, Ohio, US

- Former name: Muskingum College (1837–2009)
- Motto: Omne trium perfectum (Latin)
- Motto in English: Everything of the three perfect (Note: the seal depicts a laurel wreath, lamp, and Bible symbolizing body, mind, and soul.)
- Type: Private university
- Established: 1837; 189 years ago
- Religious affiliation: Presbyterian
- Academic affiliations: APCU; CIC
- Endowment: $101.1 million (2025)
- President: Susan Schneider Hasseler
- Students: 2,108 (fall 2023)
- Undergraduates: 1,524 (fall 2023)
- Postgraduates: 584 (fall 2023)
- Location: New Concord, Ohio, U.S. 39.998°N 81.738°W
- Campus: Rural, 225 acres (91 ha)
- Colors: Black and Magenta
- Nickname: Fighting Muskies
- Sporting affiliations: NCAA Division III – OAC
- Website: muskingum.edu
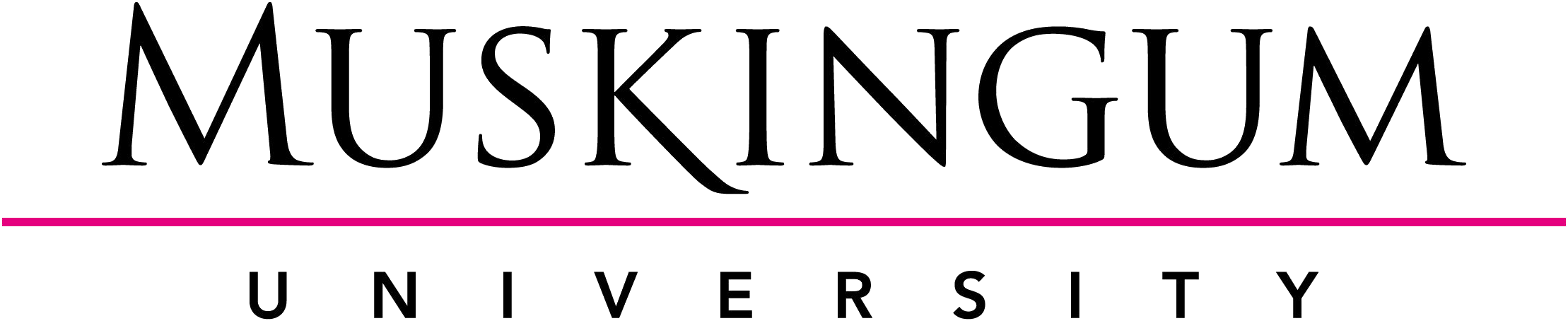

Muskingum University is a private university in New Concord, Ohio, United States. Chartered in 1837 as Muskingum College, the institution is affiliated with the Presbyterian Church (USA). New Concord is located in far eastern Muskingum County, which derives its name from the Muskingum River. It offers more than 60 undergraduate majors and graduate programs and enrolled 2,100 students in 2023. Muskingum's campus consists of 21 buildings, a football stadium, and a small lake which all sit atop 225 acres (0.91 km^{2}) of rolling hills overlooking New Concord. Alumni are referred to as the "Long Magenta Line" and students are known simply as "Muskies", while its athletic teams are called the "Fighting Muskies".

== History ==
In 1827, the National Road (now US 40) was laid through what is now New Concord, roughly following what had been the primitive roadway known as Zane's Trace. A year later, the village of New Concord was established by Scotch-Irish Presbyterians. On July 9, 1836, the first recorded meeting of the "Friends of Education" in New Concord, led by residents Samuel Willson and Benjamin Waddle, was held. A year later, the Ohio General Assembly authorized the creation of a college in New Concord after being petitioned by the "Friends of Education" committee. On April 24, 1837, Muskingum College opened. Muskingum became a coeducational institution in 1854. In 1958, the United Presbyterian Church of North America and the Presbyterian Church in the United States of America merged by signing a historic agreement in Brown Chapel on Muskingum's campus. In 2001, the school's women's softball team captured the NCAA Division III National Championship, the school's first national title.

In 2009, Muskingum College achieved university status to become Muskingum University.

== Academics ==
Muskingum has been continuously accredited by the North Central Association of college and Secondary Schools or one of its successors since 1919. "The school up on the hill", as it is sometimes called by locals, offers Bachelor of Arts and Bachelor of Science degrees at the undergraduate level, and at the graduate level Master of Information Strategy Systems and Technology, Master of Arts in Education, and Master of Arts in Teaching graduate degrees. The university offers 44 academic majors along with a large number of minors, nine pre-professional programs (including pre-law and pre-medicine) and teaching licensure.

== Campus ==
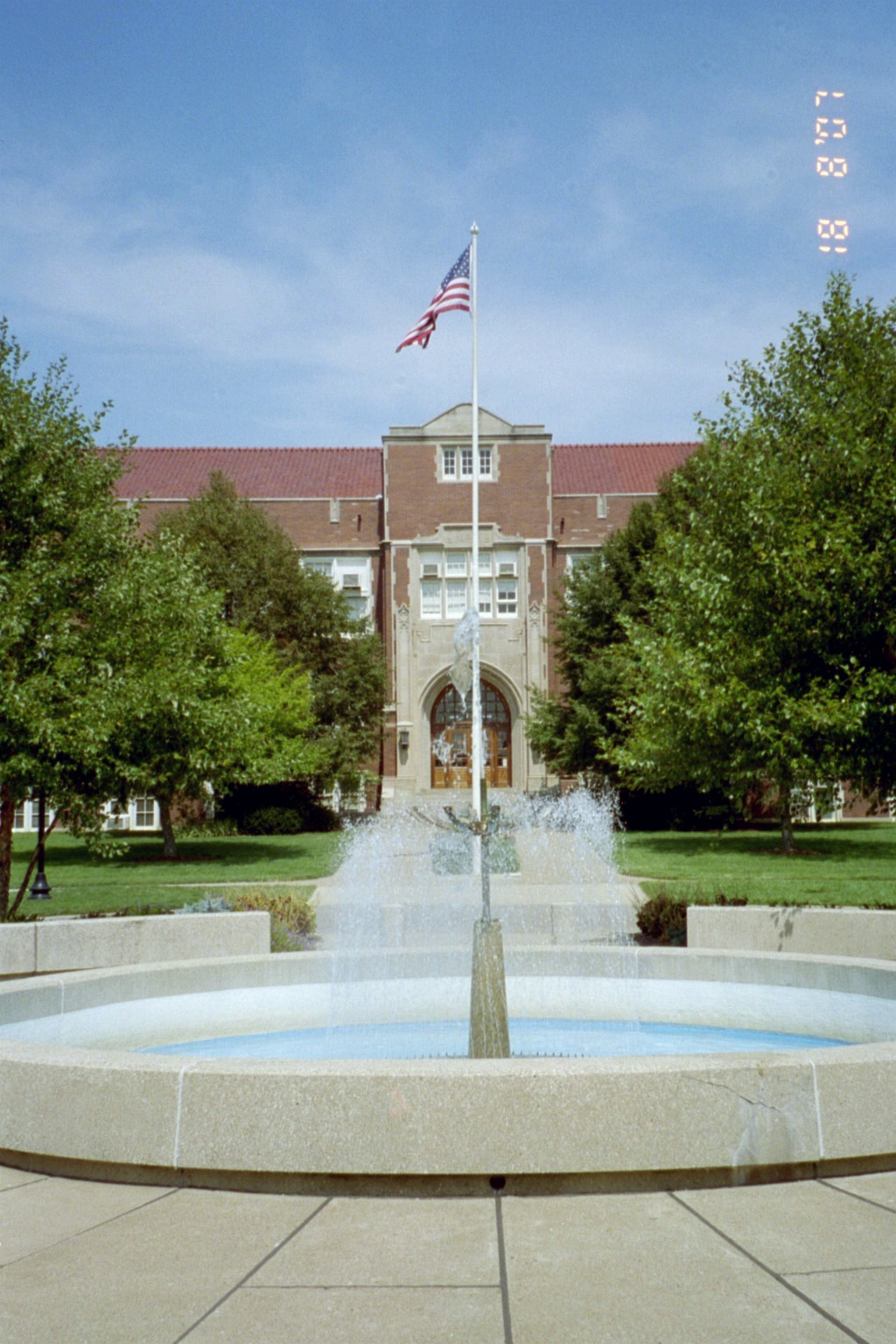
Montgomery Hall, Muskingum's main administrative building

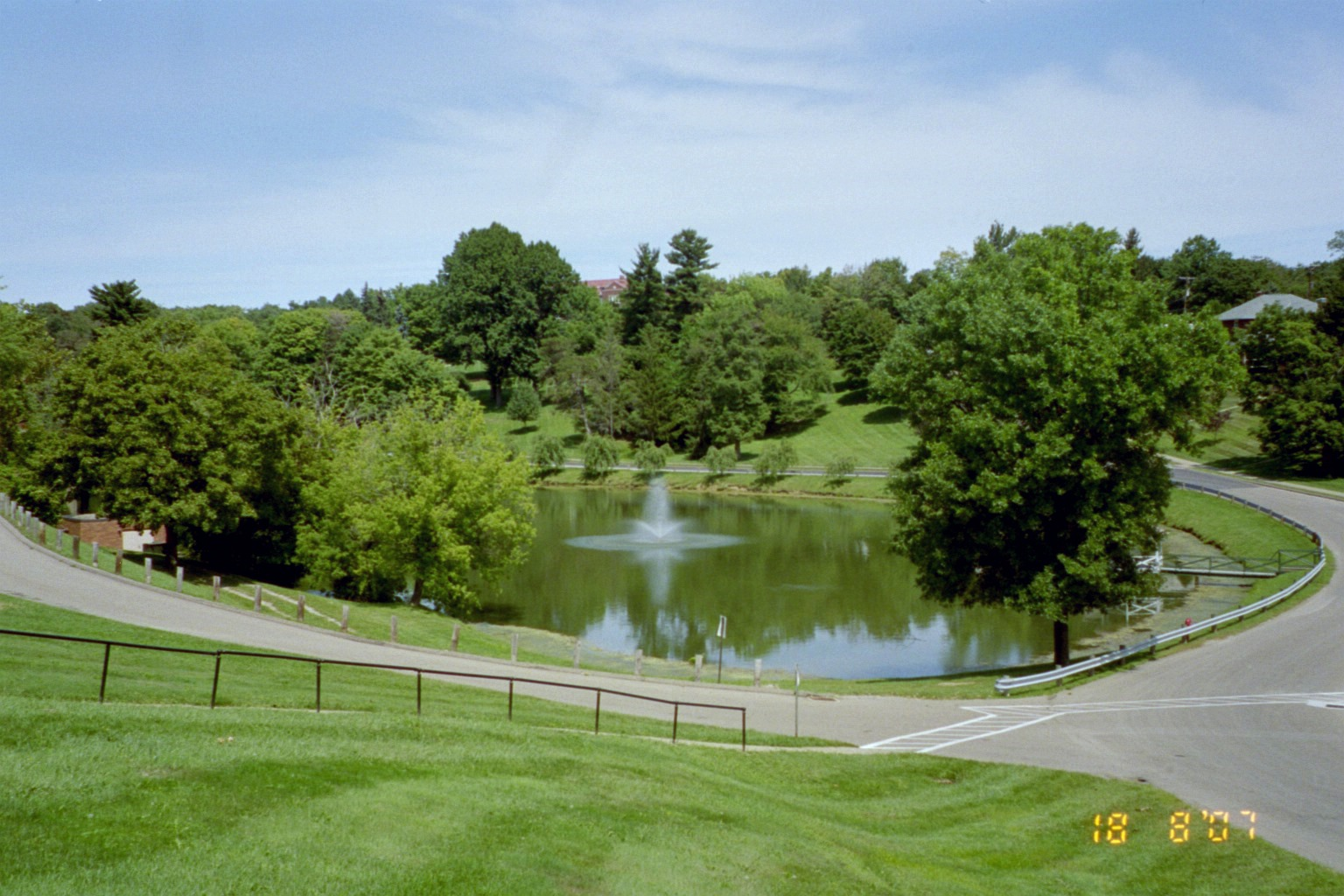
Muskingum's campus lake and surrounding hills

Most of Muskingum's academic buildings are clustered around a traditional quad near the southern part of the campus. The quad is bordered by Montgomery Hall and the College Library to the south, Caldwell Hall, Cambridge Hall and the Student/Faculty Center to the west, the Recreation Center and John Glenn Gym to the north and Boyd Science Center to the east. Brown Chapel sits on the southeastern corner of the quad.

- Paul Hall (1873) is the oldest building on Muskingum's campus. Two previous versions of this building burnt down early in the school's history. This third structure is named for Dr. David Paul, president of the college from 1865 to 1879. The building, which currently houses the art department, is registered as a National Historic Site.
- The Little Theater (1900) was constructed for physical education purposes and remodeled in 1943 for theatrical use, and was used as classroom space primarily in theatre until it was torn down in 2009.
- Brown Chapel (1912) is a multi-purpose building which serves the college as a church, chapel, auditorium and classroom. The chapel was named for J.M. Brown, a benefactor of the college and long-time member of the school's board of trustees.
- Montgomery Hall (1921) is the administrative hub of the campus, containing administrative and faculty offices and classrooms. The building is named for Dr. John Knox Montgomery Sr., president of Muskingum from 1904 until 1931, and the unofficial "Father of Muskingum College".

== Fraternities and sororities ==
The university has fraternities.

== Athletics ==
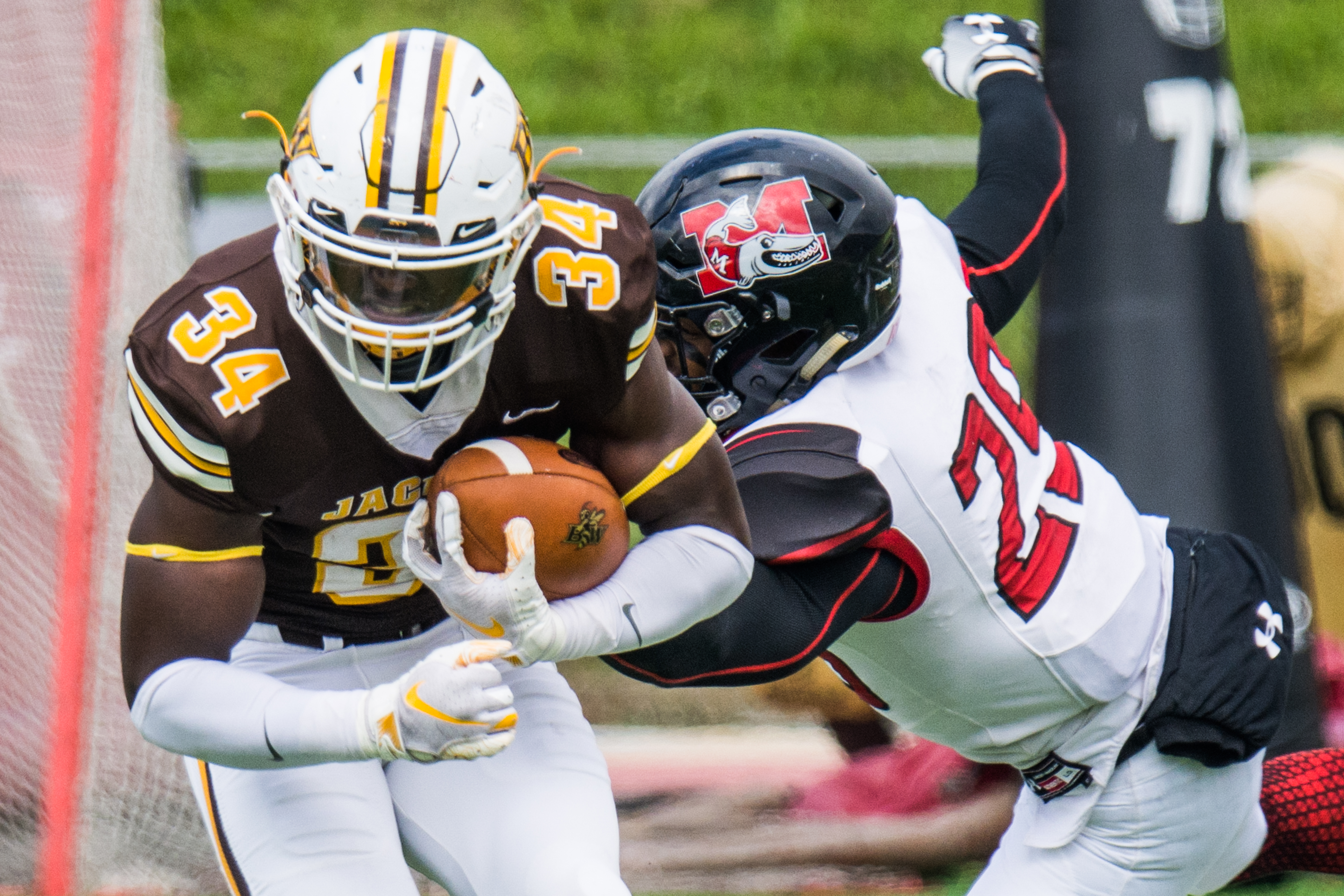
Muskingum v Baldwin Wallace football game in 2018

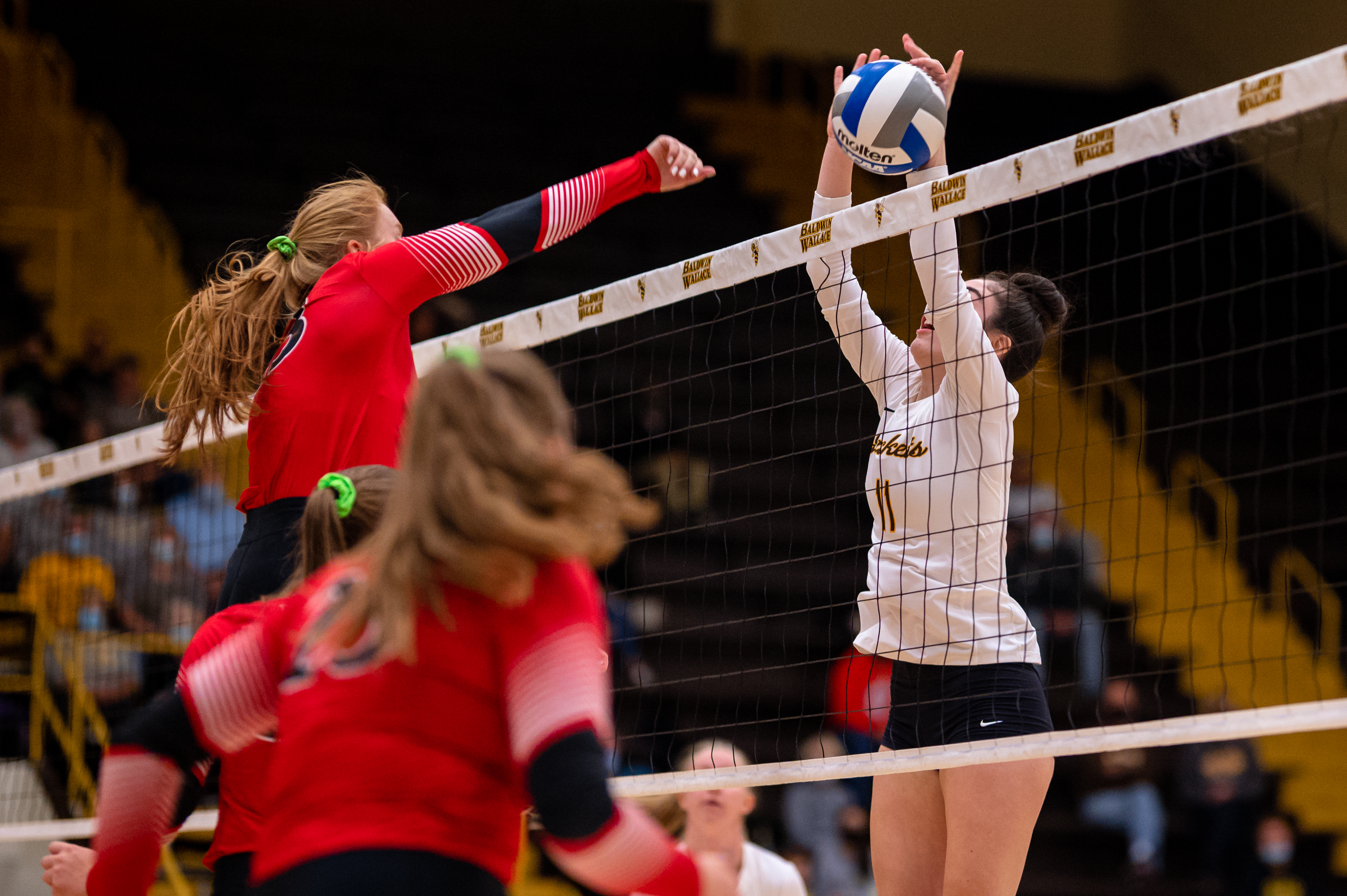
Muskingum v Baldwin Wallace women's volleyball, 2021

Muskingum competes athletically in the NCAA as a Division III school and as one of the first and longest affiliated members of the Ohio Athletic Conference (OAC). M.U.'s teams compete under the name the Fighting Muskies. Its mascot is the Fighting Muskie (muskellunge), the largest member of the pike family.

Rather than using the traditional magenta, Muskies athletics wear black and red. The school's main athletic rival is fellow OAC competitor the Marietta College Pioneers (which ironically was originally called the Muskingum Academy when established in 1797). Muskingum fields teams in American football, men's and women's basketball, women's volleyball, baseball, women's STUNT, women's softball, wrestling and men's and women's indoor track, outdoor track, bowling, soccer, tennis, cross country, lacrosse, and golf.

In the 41 seasons between 1926 and 1966, Muskingum won 12 OAC football championships, ten outright, and two shared. Six of those championships were won from 1945 to 1966 when the team was led by College Football Hall of Fame member Ed Sherman, a former Muskingum quarterback. In Sherman's last three seasons, the Muskies represented the OAC in the Grantland Rice Bowl in 1964 and 1966.

== Notable alumni ==
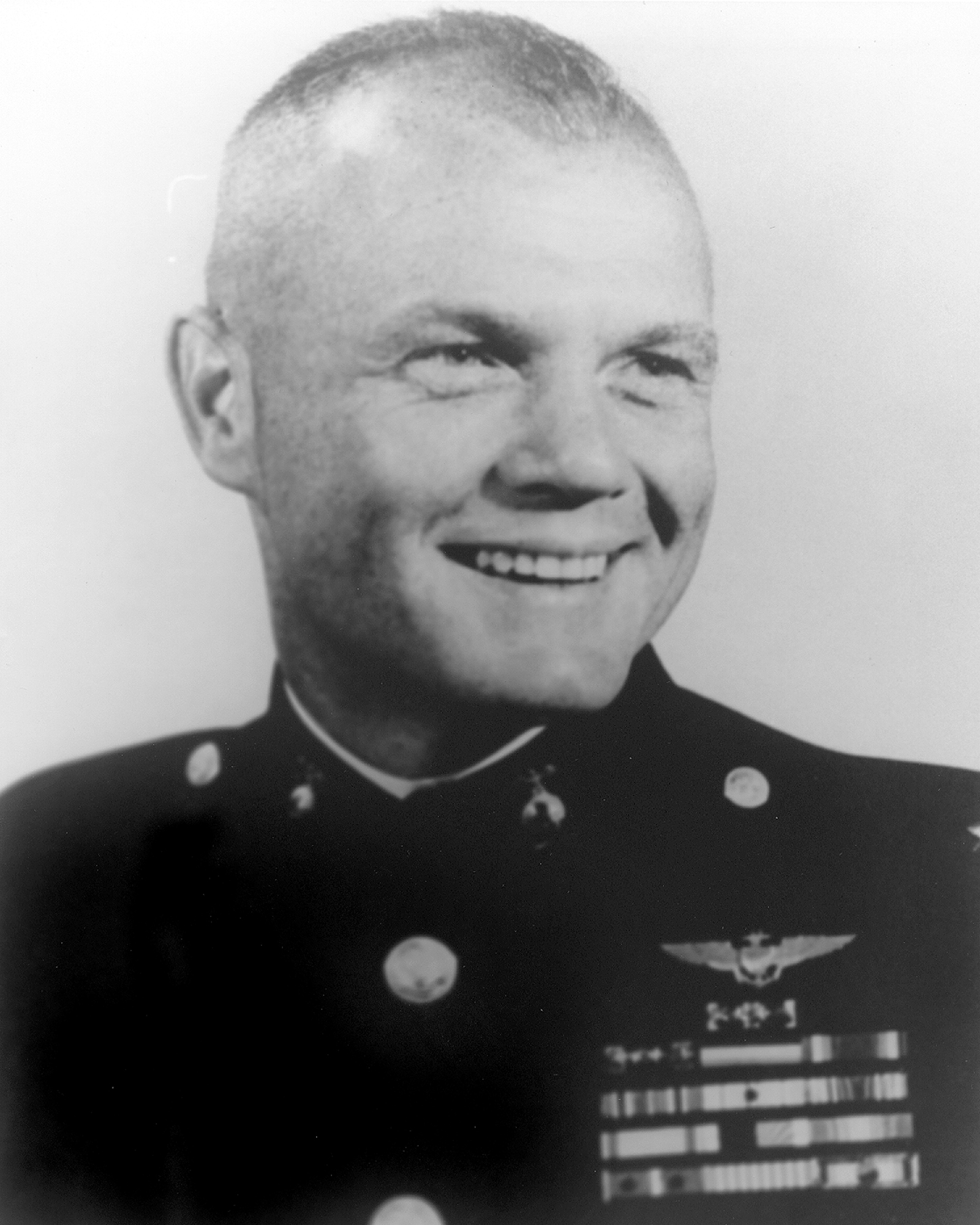
Alumnus John Glenn '43

Collectively, Muskingum's alumni are referred to as the "Long Magenta Line".

Former astronaut and U.S. senator John Glenn grew up in New Concord and graduated with a Bachelor of Science degree in Engineering from Muskingum in 1943. He was awarded an honorary degree from Muskingum in 1961, and announced his retirement from the United States Senate in Brown Chapel live on national television in 1997. Upon his retirement, Glenn donated his archives to the Ohio State University.
