= List of Alderson Broaddus Battlers head football coaches =

The Alderson Broaddus Battlers football program was a college football team that represented Alderson Broaddus University as an NCAA Division II independent.

The team had eleven head coaches since its first recorded football game in 1905. The program ceased play in 1930, but in 2012 it was announced that it will begin playing once again starting with the 2012 season under new head coach Dennis Creehan. He would play with them until 2016 after stepping down to coach at The Spring League.

== Key ==
Key to symbols in coaches list
General		Overall		Conference		Postseason (Note: Although the first Rose Bowl Game was played in 1902, it has been continuously played since the 1916 game, and is recognized as the oldest bowl game by the NCAA. "—" indicates any season prior to 1916 when postseason games were not played.)	
No.	Order of coaches (Note: A running total of the number of head coaches, with coaches who served separate tenures being counted only once. Interim head coaches are represented with "Int" and are not counted in the running total. "—" indicates the team played but either without a coach or no coach is on record. "X" indicates an interim year without play.)	GC	Games coached	CW	Conference wins	PW	Postseason wins
DC	Division championships	OW	Overall wins	CL	Conference losses	PL	Postseason losses
CC	Conference championships	OL	Overall losses	CT	Conference ties	PT	Postseason ties
NC	National championships	OT	Overall ties (Note: Overtime rules in college football were introduced in 1996, making ties impossible in the period since.)	C%	Conference winning percentage		
†	Elected to the College Football Hall of Fame	O%	Overall winning percentage (Note: When computing the win–loss percentage, a tie counts as half a win and half a loss.)				

== Coaches ==
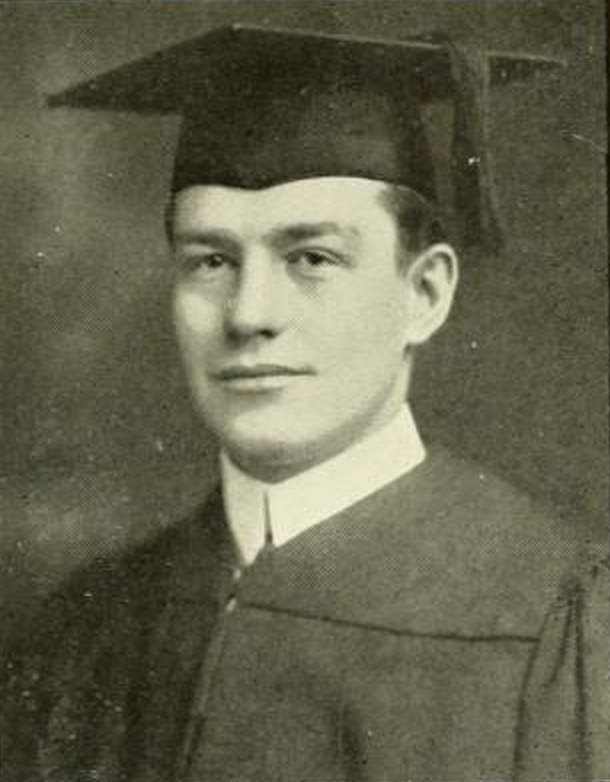
Prex Merrill was the Alderson Broaddus head coach in 1910.

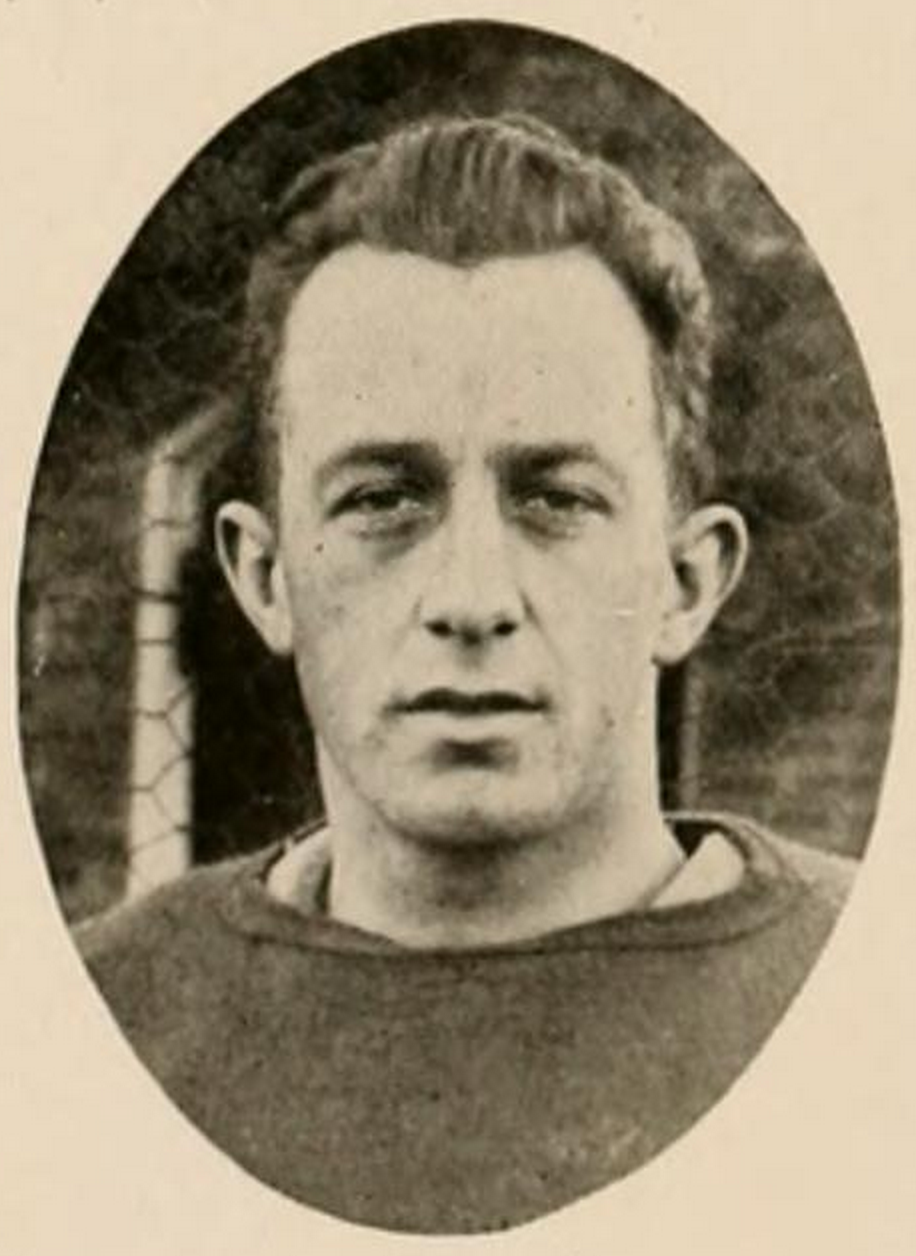
Fred Chenoweth, a 1918 graduate of West Virginia University, coached the team from 1925 to 1927.

List of head football coaches showing season(s) coached, overall records, conference records, postseason records, championships and selected awards (Note: Statistics correct as of the end of the 2022 college football season.)
No.	Name	Term	G	W	L	T	PCT	CW	CL	CT	PCT	PW	PL	PT	CCs	NCs	Awards
1	Randolph Howard	1905–1907	8	1	5	2	0.250	—	—	—	—	—	—	—	—	—	—
X	No team	1908	—	—	—	—	—	—	—	—	—	—	—	—	—	—	—
--	Unknown	1909	2	1	1	0	0.500	—	—	—	—	—	—	—	—	—	—
2	Prex Merrill	1910	4	1	3	0	0.250	—	—	—	—	—	—	—	—	—	—
--	Unknown	1911–1917	18	4	13	1	0.250	—	—	—	—	—	—	—	—	—	—
X	No team	1918	—	—	—	—	—	—	—	—	—	—	—	—	—	—	—
--	Unknown	1919–1920	11	4	5	1	0.409	—	—	—	—	—	—	—	—	—	—
3	Courtland Pollard	1921	8	2	6	0	0.250	—	—	—	—	—	—	—	—	—	—
4	Bill Latto	1922	6	3	3	0	0.500	—	—	—	—	—	—	—	—	—	—
5	Roman Krawchuck	1923	9	5	4	0	0.556	—	—	—	—	—	—	—	—	—	—
6	Furman Nuss	1924	9	3	4	2	0.444	—	—	—	—	—	—	—	—	—	—
7	Fred Chenoweth	1925–1927	22	6	14	2	0.318	—	—	—	—	—	—	—	—	—	—
8	Hunter Hardman	1928–1930	29	11	15	3	0.431	—	—	—	—	—	—	—	—	—	—
X	No team	1931–2011	—	—	—	—	—	—	—	—	—	—	—	—	—	—	—
9	Dennis Creehan	2012–2016	44	27	17	0	0.614	—	—	—	—	—	—	—	—	—	—
10	Sal Dewalt	2017–2019	32	8	24	0	0.250	—	—	—	—	—	—	—	—	—	—
11	Travis Everhart	2020–2022	26	1	25	0	0.038	—	—	—	—	—	—	—	—	—	—
