= 1928 Pittsburgh Panthers football team =

American college football season

1928 Pittsburgh Panthers football
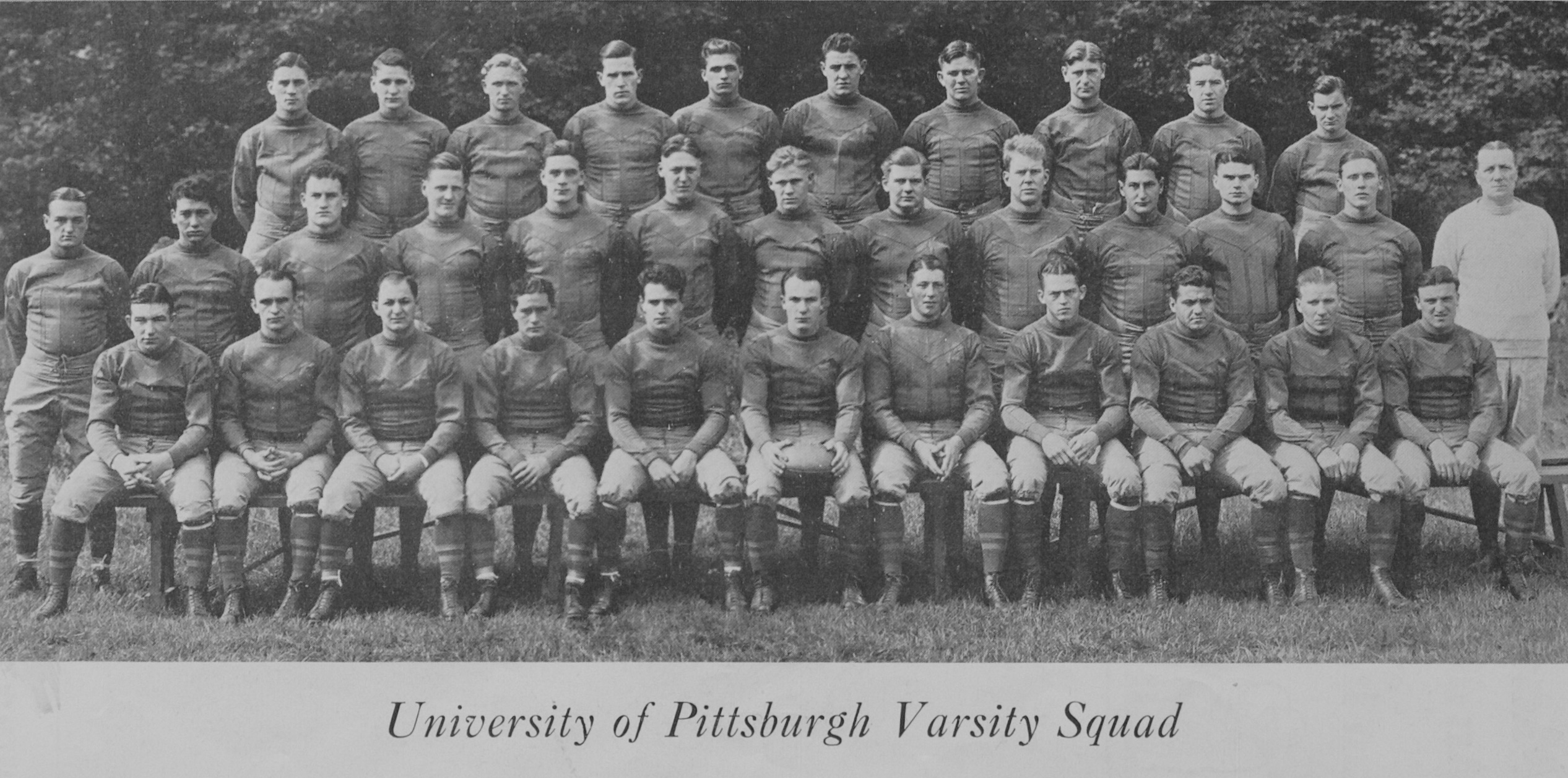
- Conference: Independent
- Record: 6–2–1
- Head coach: Jock Sutherland (5th season)
- Offensive scheme: Single-wing
- Captain: Alex Fox
- Home stadium: Pitt Stadium

1928 Eastern college football independents records
| | Conf. | | | Overall |
| Team | W | L | T | W | | L | | T |
|---|---|---|---|---|---|---|---|---|
| Boston College | | – | | 9 | – | 0 | – | 0 |
| West Chester | | – | | 8 | – | 0 | – | 0 |
| Villanova | | – | | 7 | – | 0 | – | 1 |
| Brown | | – | | 8 | – | 1 | – | 0 |
| No. 11 Penn | | – | | 8 | – | 1 | – | 0 |
| No. 6 Carnegie Tech | | – | | 7 | – | 1 | – | 0 |
| No. 9 Army | | – | | 8 | – | 2 | – | 0 |
| Drexel | | – | | 8 | – | 2 | – | 0 |
| No. 10 NYU | | – | | 8 | – | 2 | – | 0 |
| Temple | | – | | 7 | – | 1 | – | 2 |
| Lafayette | | – | | 6 | – | 1 | – | 2 |
| Princeton | | – | | 5 | – | 1 | – | 2 |
| CCNY | | – | | 4 | – | 1 | – | 2 |
| Pittsburgh | | – | | 6 | – | 2 | – | 1 |
| Harvard | | – | | 5 | – | 2 | – | 1 |
| Tufts | | – | | 5 | – | 2 | – | 1 |
| Colgate | | – | | 6 | – | 3 | – | 0 |
| Rutgers | | – | | 6 | – | 3 | – | 0 |
| Bucknell | | – | | 5 | – | 2 | – | 3 |
| Columbia | | – | | 5 | – | 3 | – | 1 |
| Boston University | | – | | 3 | – | 3 | – | 2 |
| Cornell | | – | | 3 | – | 3 | – | 2 |
| Syracuse | | – | | 4 | – | 4 | – | 1 |
| Yale | | – | | 4 | – | 4 | – | 0 |
| Fordham | | – | | 4 | – | 5 | – | 0 |
| Franklin & Marshall | | – | | 4 | – | 5 | – | 0 |
| Penn State | | – | | 3 | – | 5 | – | 1 |
| Lehigh | | – | | 3 | – | 6 | – | 0 |
| Washington & Jefferson | | – | | 2 | – | 5 | – | 2 |
| Providence | | – | | 1 | – | 5 | – | 3 |
| Vermont | | – | | 1 | – | 7 | – | 2 |
Rankings from Dickinson System

The 1928 Pittsburgh Panthers football team was an American football team that represented the University of Pittsburgh as an independent during the 1928 college football season. In its fifth season under head coach Jock Sutherland, the team compiled a 6–2–1 record, shut out seven of its nine opponents, and outscored all opponents by a total of 177 to 15. The team played its eight home games at Pitt Stadium in Pittsburgh.

== Schedule ==
| Date | Opponent | Site | Result | Attendance | Source |
|---|---|---|---|---|---|
| September 29 | Thiel | Pitt Stadium; Pittsburgh, PA | W 20–0 | 7,000 | |
| October 6 | Bethany (WV) | Pitt Stadium; Pittsburgh, PA | W 53–0 | | |
| October 13 | West Virginia | Pitt Stadium; Pittsburgh, PA (rivalry) | L 6–9 | 25,000 | |
| October 20 | Allegheny | Pitt Stadium; Pittsburgh, PA | W 29–0 | 8,000 | |
| October 27 | Carnegie Tech | Pitt Stadium; Pittsburgh, PA | L 0–6 | 45,000 | |
| November 3 | Syracuse | Pitt Stadium; Pittsburgh, PA (rivalry) | W 18–0 | 11,000 | |
| November 10 | Washington & Jefferson^{†} | Pitt Stadium; Pittsburgh, PA | W 25–0 | 14,000 | |
| November 17 | at Nebraska | Memorial Stadium; Lincoln, NE | T 0–0 | 23,000 | |
| November 29 | Penn State | Pitt Stadium; Pittsburgh, PA (rivalry) | W 26–0 | 32,209-35,000 | |
^{†}Homecoming

== Preseason ==
Numerous changes in the Athletic Department of the University of Pittsburgh occurred during the spring and summer of 1928. On March 8, 1928 the executive committee of the board of trustees appointed W. D. Harrison, dean of men at the University of Pittsburgh since 1923, to the office of director of athletics. He replaced Elmer F. Blakeslee, who held the job less than a year and resigned for business reasons. In May, Karl E. Davis, longtime graduate manager of athletics, resigned his position. His football scheduling duties had been usurped by the athletic director's office and he spent most of his time fulfilling his duties as the Alumni Secretary. The graduate manager position no longer existed. On July 28 Dr. Oliver R. Kendrick was named to replace his brother, Dr. Thomas R. Kendrick, as team physician. Thomas Kendrick, who died unexpectedly on April 17, was a former Pitt gridder, who earned his football letter in 1918 and also lettered in wrestling. Ollie De Victor, popular football trainer for 8 years, was replaced by George “Bud” Moore on September 1. Moore was Lafayette's trainer during Jock Sutherland's tenure. The Athletic Department appointed Dr. Zonar Wissinger and Dr. Roscoe "Skip" Gougler freshmen team coaches to replace H. Clifford Carlson.

David Chester Stewart, a member of the class of 1929 in the School of Business Administration, was selected to be the 1928 varsity student football manager. The selection was made by a committee of five, made up of the captain, the coach, the varsity football manager, the assistant athletic director and the graduate manager.

The lettermen elected guard Alex Fox captain for the 1928 season.

With the graduation of sixteen players from the 1927 Eastern Championship team, captain Fox and coach Sutherland had a tough assignment to get the Panthers to perform at the same level for the 1928 season. For this reason coach Sutherland wanted to open spring drills on March 19, but was delayed a week due to snow. Spring practice officially kicked off on March 26 with 87-100 aspiring lads vying for a spot on the team. Sutherland mused: "No coach has ever had a greener gang of candidates. The team as a whole, is lacking the fundamentals of the game, but the two months of spring practice will enable them to be drilled at least in those points." At the conclusion of the spring drills coach Sutherland expressed the opinion that his first string was capable but the reserves needed experience. Alex Fox was quoted: "We aren't the same squad we were last year or anything like it, but we are a fighting squad that should come through. Of course, we won't have a perfect record, but at least Pitt will not be ashamed of her team."

The fifteenth annual fall practice at Camp Hamilton commenced on September 2. Fifty-two Pitt Panther athletes, hoping to earn a spot on the roster, spent two weeks learning the Sutherland system during the twice a day practice sessions. On the final day of camp the varsity earned a 7 to 0 victory over the substitutes in the closing scrimmage game.

== Coaching staff ==
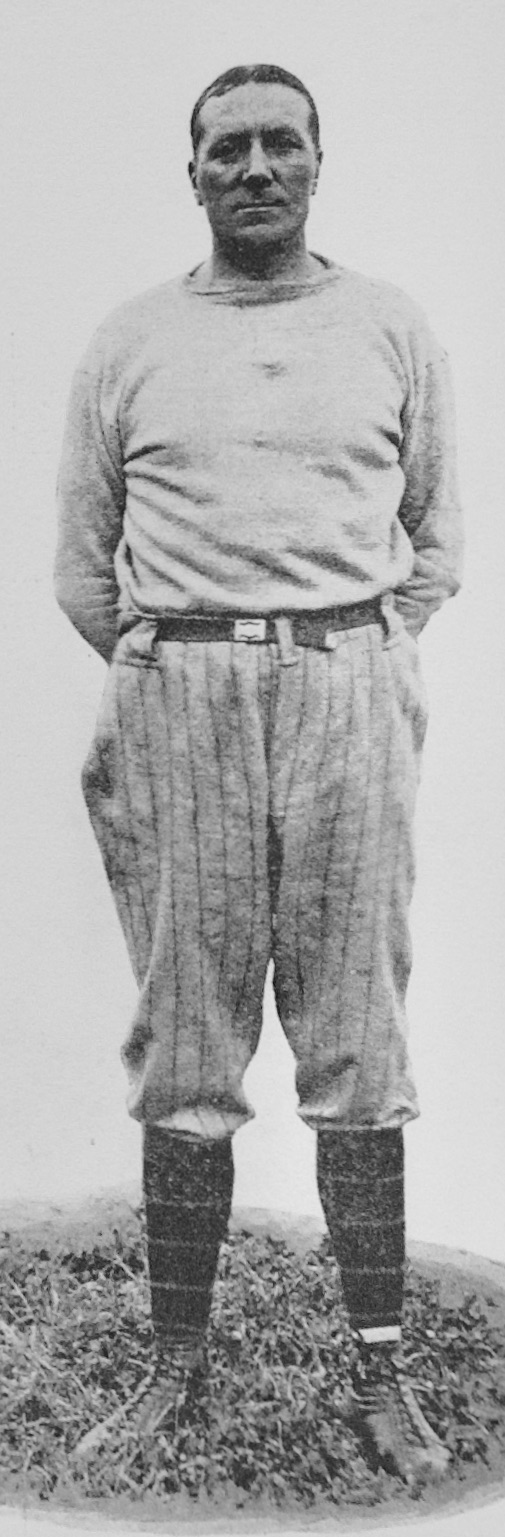
Coach Sutherland

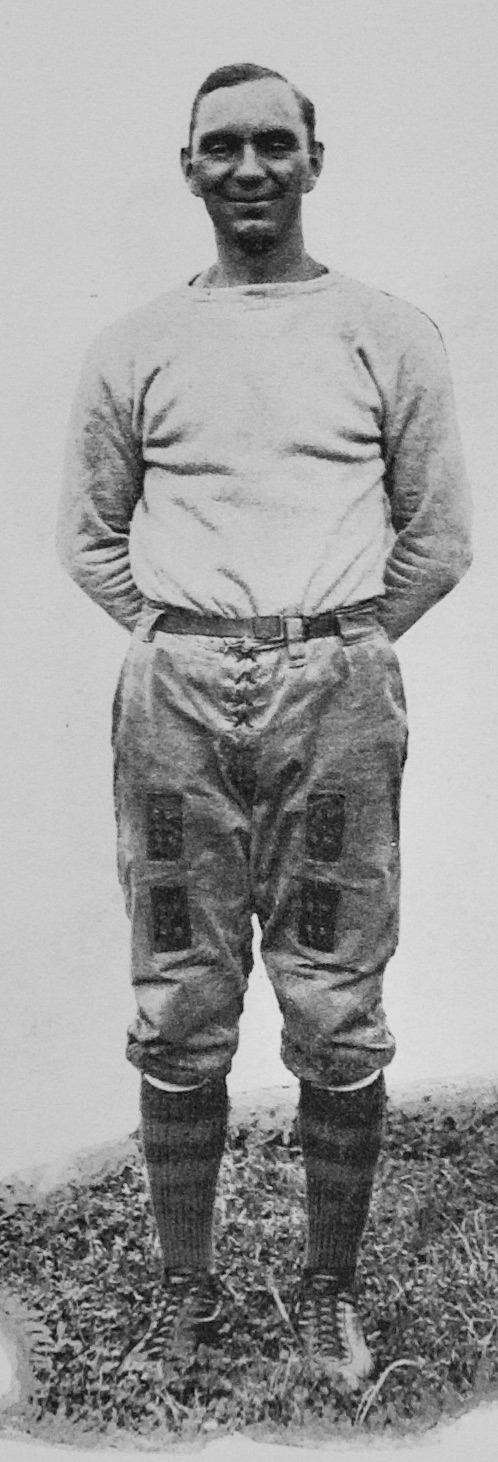
Charley Bowser

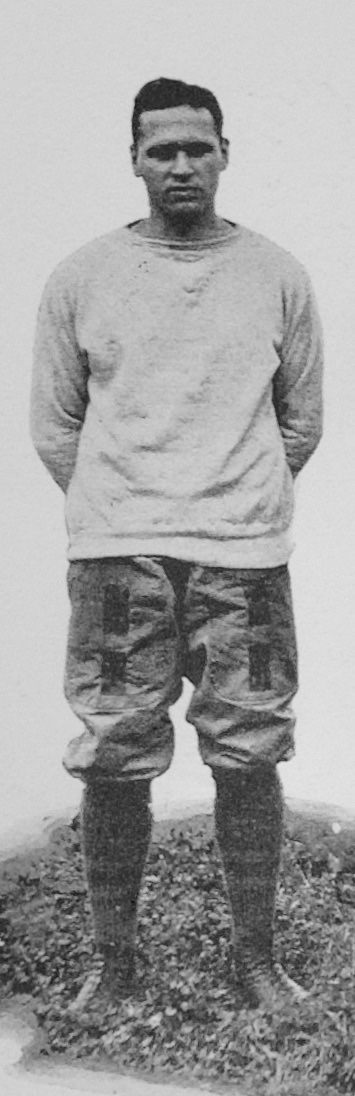
Paul Templeton

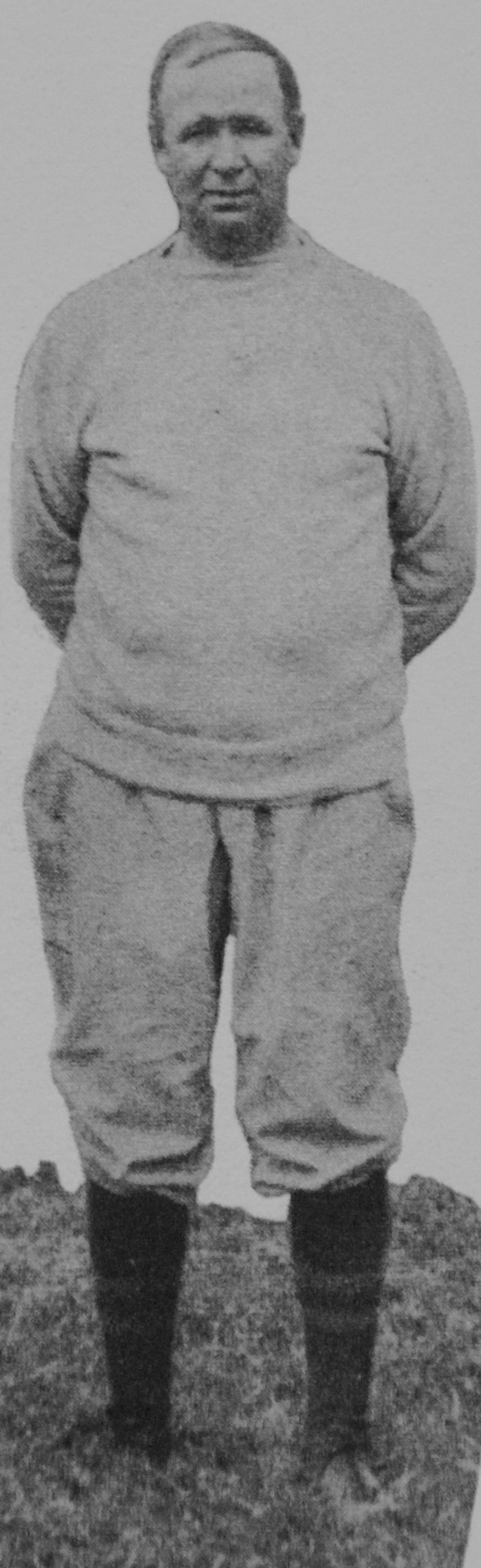
Alex Stevenson

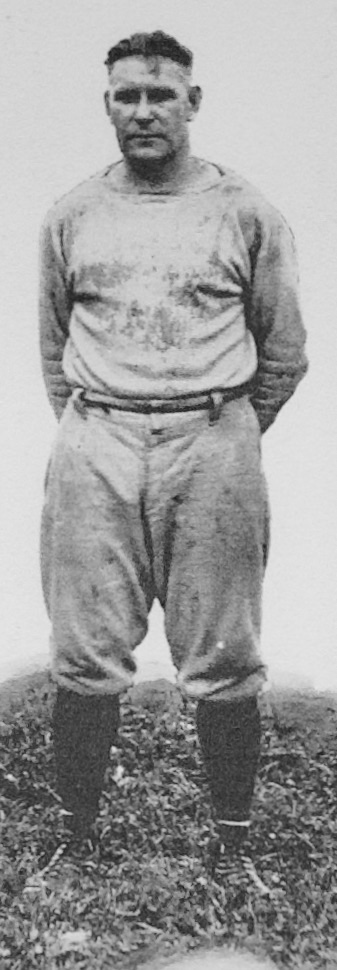
Roscoe Gougler

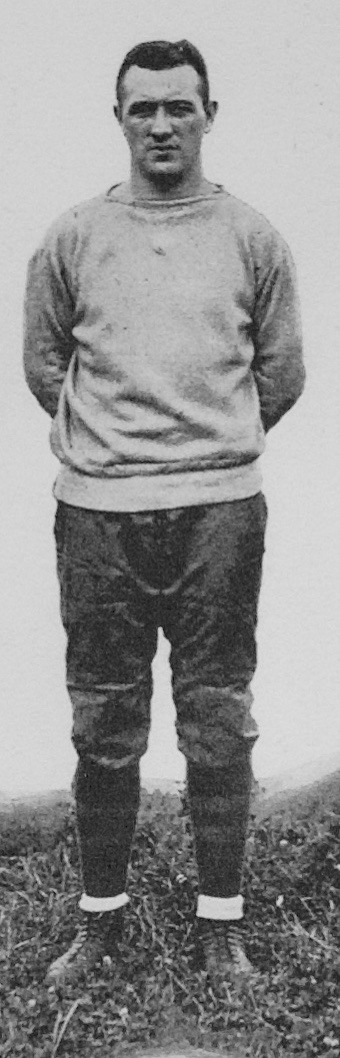
Zoner Wissinger

1928 Pittsburgh Panthers football staff
| Coaching staff: John B. "Jock" Sutherland – Head coach; Charley Bowser – Assistant coach; Paul Templeton – part-time assistant coach; Alexander Stevenson – Assistant coach - scout; Roscoe "Skip" Gougler – freshmen coach; Zoner Wissinger – freshmen coach | Support staff: David Stewart– student football manager; Dr. Ollie Kendrick – team physician; George Moore – team trainer; P. S. Browne – custodian of equipment; W. D. Harrison - director of athletics; F. W. Williams – assistant director of athletics |

== Roster ==
1928 Pittsburgh Panthers football roster
| Player | Position | Games | Height | Weight | Class | School | Prep School | Hometown |
|---|---|---|---|---|---|---|---|---|
| Alexander Fox* | guard | 9 | 5' 10" | 174 | 1929 | B. Sci., Business Adm. | New Castle H. S. | New Castle, Pa. |
| Mike Getto* | tackle | 9 | 6' 2" | 194 | 1929 | Business Adm. | Jeannette H. S. | Jeannette, Pa. |
| Albert Guarino* | end | 9 | 5' 8" | 170 | 1929 | College | Bellefonte Academy | Greensburg, Pa. |
| Charles Edwards* | quarterback | 9 | 5' 11" | 168 | 1930 | Bachelor of Science | Wyoming Seminary | Moundsville, W. Va. |
| Octavius Uansa* | halfback | 9 | 5' 9" | 167 | 1930 | College | McKees Rocks H. S. | McKees Rocks, Pa. |
| Joe Donchess* | end | 9 | 6' | 166 | 1930 | Medical School | Wyoming Seminary | Youngstown, O. |
| Tom Parkinson* | halfback | 7 | 5' 11" | 191 | 1931 | Dental School | California H. S. | California, Pa. |
| Ray Montgomery* | guard | 9 | 6' | 181 | 1930 | School of Business | Warwood H. S. | Wheeling, W. Va. |
| Arthur L. Corson* | tackle | 6 | 6' | 189 | 1930 | Business Adm. | Wyoming Seminary | New Albany, Pa. |
| Markley Barnes* | center | 5 | 6' | 172 | 1929 | Business Adm. | Broaddus Academy | Wellsburg, W. Va. |
| Albert DiMeolo* | guard | 9 | 5' 11" | 176 | 1930 | Dental | Bellefonte Academy | Coraopolis, Pa. |
| Charles Tully* | tackle | 9 | | 181 | 1931 | Business Adm. | | Wheeling, W. Va. |
| Harold Williams* | halfback | 9 | | 162 | 1931 | Education | Mars H. S. | Mars, Pa. |
| Edward Baker* | center | 7 | | 162 | 1931 | Dental | Nanticoke H. S. | Nanticoke, Pa. |
| James Rooney* | quarterback | 6 | 5' 11" | 170 | 1930 | Dental | Bellefonte Academy | Pittsburgh, Pa. |
| James A. Scanlon* | end | 6 | 6' | 173 | 1929 | Dental | The Kiski School | Pittsburgh, Pa. |
| William Walinchus* | halfback | 8 | | 169 | 1931 | Dental | Mahanoy City H. S. | Mahanoy City, Pa. |
| Ernest Lewis | guard | 7 | | 185 | 1931 | Dental | Steelton H. S. | Steelton, Pa. |
| William Loehr | end | 6 | | 160 | 1931 | | Turtle Creek H. S. | Turtle Creek, Pa. |
| R. Felix Wilps | halfback | 5 | 5' 9" | 158 | 1930 | Civil Engineering | Norwin H. S. | Irwin, Pa. |
| Reginald Bowen | halfback | 5 | 6' | 154 | 1928 | Business Adm. | Erie East H. S. | Erie, Pa. |
| Jesse Crissinger | guard | 6 | | 180 | 1931 | | | N. Cumberland, W. Va. |
| Bucky Wagner | halfback | 5 | | 160 | 1931 | Business Adm. | | Pittsburgh, Pa. |
| Franklin Hood | halfback | 4 | | 192 | 1931 | | Monaca H. S. | Monaca, Pa. |
| Philip Goldberg* | end | 4 | 5' 9" | 154 | 1929 | B. Sci., College | New Kensington H. S. | New Kensington, Pa. |
| Paul Greenberger | tackle | 3 | | 196 | 1931 | | | Pittsburgh, Pa. |
| Nevin Faw | guard | 3 | | 200 | 1931 | Dental | Monongahela H. S. | Monongahela City, Pa. |
| Al Ciper | tackle | 2 | | 180 | 1931 | | Glenwillard H. S. | Glenwillard, Pa. |
| Michael Uram | fullback | 1 | | 170 | 1931 | | | Forrest Hills, Pa. |
| Daniel Fuge | guard | 1 | | 174 | 1931 | | | Pittsburgh, Pa. |
| Frank Fisher | guard | 0 | | 170 | 1931 | Dental | Allegheny H. S. | Pittsburgh, Pa. |
| Edward Schultz | halfback | 1 | | 162 | 1931 | College | Pittston H. S. | West Pittston, Pa. |
| Robert Graham | tackle | 0 | | 182 | 1931 | Dental | Swissvale H. S. | Wilkinsburg, Pa. |
| Theodore Helsing | end | 1 | 5' 11" | 168 | 1930 | Civil Engineering | Wilkinsburg H. S. | Wilkinsburg, Pa. |
| Edward Sherako | end | 0 | 6' | 169 | 1929 | Business Adm. | Wyoming Seminary | Plymouth, Pa. |
| John Jones | fullback | 0 | | 150 | 1931 | | Sutersville H. S. | Sutersville, Pa. |
| Raymond Anderson | tackle | 0 | | 176 | 1931 | | Coraopolis H. S. | Coraopolis, Pa. |
| Richard Calhoun | guard | 0 | | 181 | 1931 | | | Pittsburgh, Pa. |
| Raymond Bruecken | tackle | 0 | | 180 | 1931 | | | Pittsburgh, Pa. |
| M. J. Petrosky | halfback | 0 | | 157 | 1931 | | Braddock H. S. | Braddock, Pa. |
| David Stewart* | manager | | | | 1929 | Business Adm. | Harrisburg Tech. H. S. | Harrisburg, Pa. |
* Letterman

== Game summaries ==
=== Thiel ===
Week 1: Thiel at Pitt

| Team | 1 | 2 | 3 | 4 | Total |
|---|---|---|---|---|---|
| Thiel | 0 | 0 | 0 | 0 | 0 |
| • Pitt | 0 | 6 | 0 | 14 | 20 |

- Date: September 29, 1928
- Location: Pitt Stadium
  Pittsburgh, PA
- Game start: 3:00 p.m.
- Game attendance: 7,000
- Game weather: sunny
- Referee: R. E. Cadigan (Syracuse)

Pitt beat Thiel all three previous times they played and out scored the Lutherans 106 to 0. Thiel coach Tommy Holleran, former Pitt star, had a veteran squad led by star quarterback Stan Berkman and reported his team to be 50 per cent stronger than last season.

The Post-Gazette noted: "The Pitt squad ended four weeks of intensive training work yesterday, and no Panther team ever was in better physical trim. Bronzed and toughened by two weeks of conditioning work at their mountain training camp, followed by another two weeks devoted to the perfection of plays and formations, Sutherland's players are ready for their initial test of the season."

Harry Keck of the Sun-Telegraph reported: "The University of Pittsburgh Panthers, making their first appearance of the 1928 gridiron campaign, before a crowd of about 7,000 students, alumni, youngsters and just fans, had to cut loose with everything they had to score a 20 to 0 victory over Dr. Tommy Holleran's valiant little band of football warriors from Thiel College, of Greenville, Pa, in the stadium Saturday."

Pitt had a golden opportunity to score in the first period as Thiel halfback Suscavitch fumbled on his 21-yard line and Pitt tackle Mike Getto recovered. The Pitt offense advanced the ball to the 7-yard line but a holding call moved it back to the 22-yard line and a fumble by halfback Harold Williams turned the ball over to Thiel on their 21-yard line. At the end of the quarter, Pitt gained possession on their 43-yard line and advanced the ball to the Thiel 7-yard line when time expired. Toby Uansa scored on the first play of the second stanza. Charles Edwards missed the point after and Pitt led at halftime 6 to 0. The Thiel offense threatened to score in the third stanza but Edward Baker intercepted a pass on the 3-yard line and ran it out to the 41-yard line to thwart the drive. Pitt punted early in the fourth period and Thiel was guilty of clipping which gave the Panthers possession on the Lutherans 44-yard line. A 19 yard pass play from Uansa to Edwards, a 16 yard run by Parkinson and an offside penalty by Thiel took the ball to the 3-yard line. "Uansa slid off tackle to within inches of the goal line. Parkinson tore through left guard for a touchdown...Edwards drop-kicked the extra point." Pitt led 13 to 0. Pitt regained possession when Thiel back Schilling fumbled on second down and Jesse Crissinger recovered for the Panthers on the Thiel 28-yard line. Uansa scored his second touchdown of the afternoon on an eleven yard scamper around left end. He added the point after and Pitt had a 20 to 0 victory. Thiel finished the season with a 1–6–2 record and the Panthers and Lutherans would not meet again on the gridiron.

The Pitt starting lineup for the opening game against Thiel was Joe Donchess (left end), Ray Montgomery (left tackle), Albert DiMeolo (left guard), Markley Barnes (center), Alex Fox (right guard), Mike Getto (right tackle), Albert Guarino (right end), Charles Edwards (quarterback), Toby Uansa (left halfback), Harold Williams (right halfback) and Tom Parkinson (fullback). Substitutes appearing in the game for Pitt were James Scanlon, Charles Tully, Jesse Crissinger, Edward Baker, Ernest Lewis, William Loehr, Bucky Wagner, Felix Wilps, William Walinchus, Reginald Bowen, Philip Goldberg, and Al Ciper.

=== Bethany ===
Week 2: Bethany at Pitt

| Team | 1 | 2 | 3 | 4 | Total |
|---|---|---|---|---|---|
| Bethany | 0 | 0 | 0 | 0 | 0 |
| • Pitt | 20 | 13 | 14 | 6 | 53 |

- Date: October 6, 1928
- Location: Pitt Stadium
  Pittsburgh, PA
- Game start: 2:30 p.m.
- Game weather: sunny
- Referee: E. C. Taggart (Rochester)

The Panthers second non-major opponent was the Bethany College Bison from Bethany, West Virginia. The Panthers led the all-time series 5–0 and out-scored the Bisons 141 to 0 in the process. The teams last met in 1917 with Pitt winning by a 40–0 margin. Former W. & J. halfback Furman Nuss was in his fourth year as coach, and had the Bisons 1–1 on the season. His squad bested Broaddus College from Philippi, West Virginia, 24 to 7 in their opener, and then, held W. & J. scoreless for a half before succumbing to the Presidents 24 to 0.

The Post-Gazette was somewhat pessimistic: "Facing the strongest college team that has played in Pittsburgh in several seasons, Coach Jock Sutherland's Golden Pitt Panthers will meet their first hard test of the season this afternoon when they line up against a husky Bethany eleven. Captain Dale Fiers, Bethany's hard-hitting fullback, and Lund, a stellar punter, are expected to provide most of the visitor's punch."

Jess Carver of the Sun-Telegraph was a realist as the college teams in Pittsburgh played their second game of the season. "Pittsburgh games include the Pitt-Bethany affair at the stadium and the Tech-Ashland fracas at Forbes Field. It depends on who you are as to how you'll regard the tussles. If you are disinterested, you'll probably classify them as setups for Pitt and Tech. If you are a student at either school, you'll naturally call'em tough ones. If you're from Bethany or Ashland, you'll rate the boys a uniform and teach them a prayer."

The Bison had no defense as Pitt raced up and down the field scoring eight touchdowns and converting five extra points for a final tally of 53 to 0. Sophomore halfback Harold "Josh" Williams and Felix Wilps scored three touchdowns apiece, while Tom Parkinson and Philip Goldberg each added one. Charles Edwards converted 2 dropkick extra points and James Rooney was successful on all three of his placement attempts. The Panthers garnered 16 first downs to Bethany's 7, but the Panthers surrendered 105 yards on eleven penalties or the score may have been worse.

The Post-Gazette noted: "Sutherland got an opportunity to use virtually every man on his squad. They did everything that a smart, powerful aggregation should do, and the thousands of fans left the stadium satisfied that Sutherland and his lads are going to enjoy another successful season."

The Bison finished the season with a 1–6–1 record. Pitt and Bethany would not meet on the gridiron again until 1943.

The Pitt starting lineup for the game against Bethany was Joe Donchess (left end), Charles Tully (left tackle), Alex Fox (left guard), Ray Montgomery (center), Albert DiMeolo (right guard), Mike Getto (right tackle), Albert Guarino (right end), Charles Edwards (quarterback), Toby Uansa (left halfback), Josh Williams (right halfback) and Tom Parkinson (fullback). Substitutes appearing in the game for Pitt were William Walinchus, Jesse Crissinger, Bucky Wagner, James Rooney, Felix Wilps, Al Ciper, William Loehr, James Scanlon, Ernest Lewis, Arthur Corson, Ted Helsing, M. Petrosky, Philip Goldberg, Daniel Fuge, Paul Greenberger, Edward Schultz, Nevin Faw, Robert Graham, Michael Uram and Frank Fischer.

=== West Virginia ===
Week 3: West Virginia at Pitt

| Team | 1 | 2 | 3 | 4 | Total |
|---|---|---|---|---|---|
| • West Virginia | 0 | 0 | 7 | 2 | 9 |
| Pitt | 0 | 6 | 0 | 0 | 6 |

- Date: October 13, 1928
- Location: Pitt Stadium
  Pittsburgh, PA
- Game start: 2:30 p.m.
- Game attendance: 25,000
- Game weather: warm
- Referee: Dexter W. Very (Penn State)

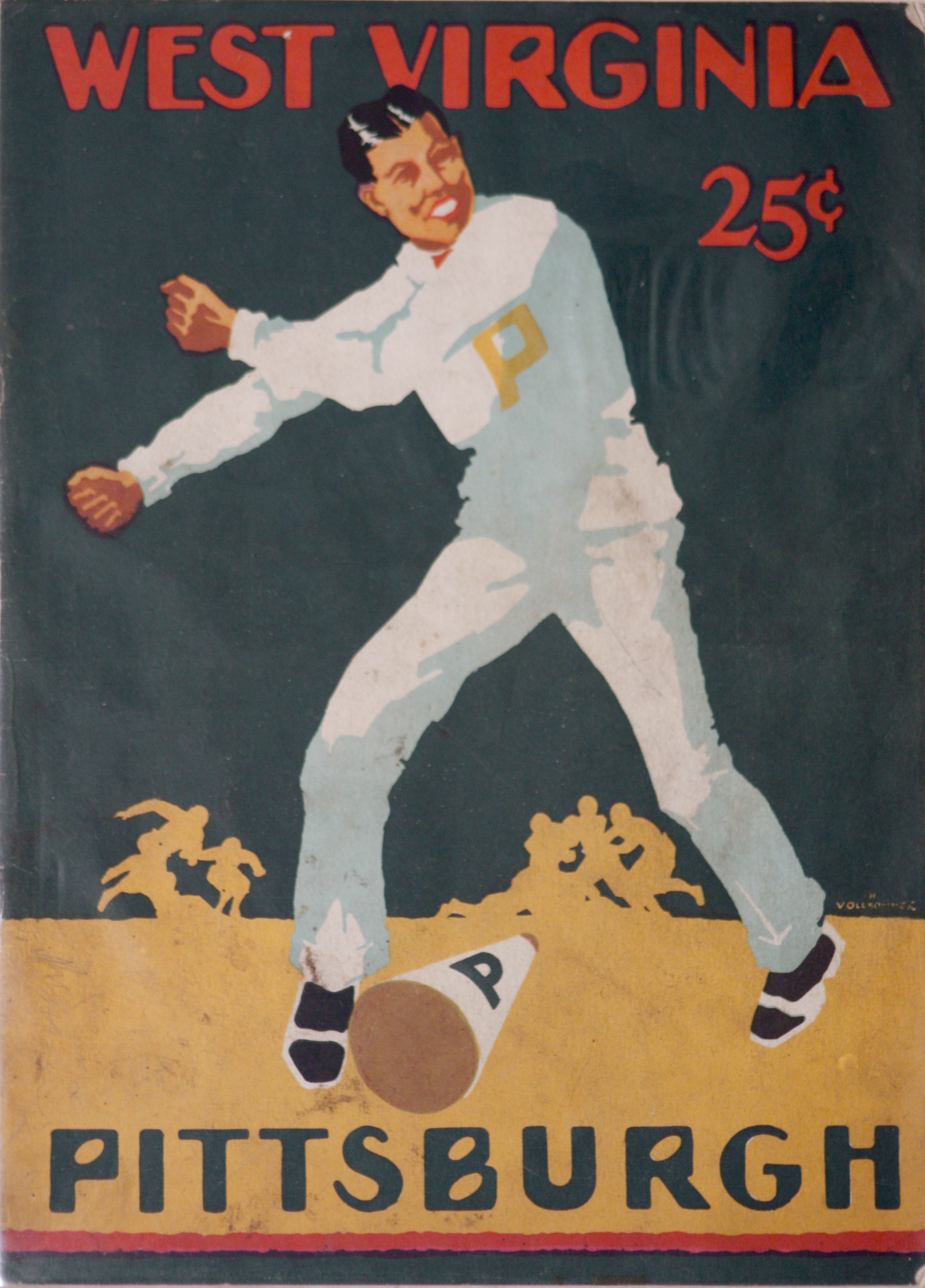
Program for October 13, 1928 Pitt vs. West Virginia game

The first meaningful game on the schedule was against the Mountaineers of West Virginia. Fourth-year coach Ira Rodgers' eleven started the season with a 7 to 0 loss to Davis & Elkins College and then won their next two in preparation for the Panther tussle. Pitt led the all-time series by a 15–7–1 margin. "West Virginia University's husky squad is coming to the stadium Saturday with blood in its eye. Still smarting from that crushing 40 to 0 defeat administered by the championship Golden Panther team last season and with a veteran lineup to hurl against Coach Sutherland's new eleven, the Mountaineers are primed to make amends for the debacle of last year."

Howard Linn, former Panther guard, scouted the Mountaineers victory over Haskell Institute for Coach Sutherland and reported: "Don't let the boys take West Virginia too lightly, they are tough! The Mountaineers had a clean cut victory over the Indians...they showed a lot of power and drive, and Captain Keefer is a line-plunging fool."

Injured Pitt guard Albert DiMeolo was replaced by Ernest Lewis, otherwise Sutherland started the same lineup that scored fifty-three points against Bethany.

Pitt fans unable to attend the game were able to listen to one of two local stations broadcasting the game. KQV had Ralph Hagner and Paul Miller giving the play-by-play while KDKA employed Louis Kaufman to describe the action.

For the first time in five years, the Mountaineers won the backyard brawl as they earned a 9 to 6 comeback victory over the Pitt Panthers. Pitt started strong and marched the ball to the West Virginia 2-yard line before losing the ball on downs. Mid-second period the Panthers gained possession on their 13-yard line and running backs Toby Uansa, Tom Parkinson and Josh Williams advanced the ball the length of the field. Uansa slashed through left tackle from the seven for the touchdown. James Rooney's placement attempt was blocked. Pitt led 6 to 0 at halftime. Early in the second half the Panthers owned possession on the Mountaineer 47-yard line. Charles Edwards' attempted pass was intercepted by Edwin Bartrug and returned to the Pitt 4-yard line. "(Edward) Stumpp shot a pass over the right side of the line to (Nelson) Lang for the tying touchdown. Stumpp held the ball for Marshall (Little Sleepy) Glenn, who place-kicked for the extra point." West Virginia led 7 to 6. “From then on, however, Pitt's punch was lacking.” The safety came late in the game as Rooney mishandled a bad pass from center and recovered the ball behind the end zone line. Final Score: West Virginia 9 to Pitt 6. The Mountaineers finished the season with an 8–2 record.

The Pitt starting lineup for the game against West Virginia was Joe Donchess (left end), Charles Tully (left tackle), Alex Fox (left guard), Ray Montgomery (center), Ernest Lewis (right guard), Mike Getto (right tackle), Albert Guarino (right end), Charles Edwards (quarterback), Tobby Uansa (left Halfback), Josh Williams (right halfback) and Tom Parkinson (fullback). Substitutes appearing in the game for Pitt were James Scanlon, Arthur Corson, Nevin Faw, Jesse Crissinger, Edward Baker, Albert DiMeolo, William Loehr, James Rooney, Reginald Bowen and William Walinchus.

=== Allegheny ===
Week 4: Allegheny at Pitt

| Team | 1 | 2 | 3 | 4 | Total |
|---|---|---|---|---|---|
| Allegheny | 0 | 0 | 7 | 0 | 7 |
| • Pitt | 6 | 16 | 0 | 7 | 29 |

- Date: October 20, 1928
- Location: Pitt Stadium
  Pittsburgh, PA
- Game start: 2:30 p.m.
- Game attendance: 8,000
- Game weather: cool
- Referee: Eugene W. Carson (Penn State)

"Allegheny has new strength to offer stubborn resistance, while the Panthers have slackened the championship pace set by the 1927 team." Third-year coach Mel Merritt's Allegheny College Methodists came to Pittsburgh sporting a 2–1 record. They beat Mount Union and Westminster and then lost at Dartmouth. Several starters sustained injuries during the Dartmouth tussle but "Allegheny will present a tough lineup that will make the Panthers scramble."

The Panthers lineup had halfback James Rooney starting in place of Toby Uansa.

W. J. Farrell of The Pittsburgh Press reported: "Pitt's 'Golden Panther' football team returned to its winning ways yesterday afternoon at the stadium, when it completely outplayed the Allegheny eleven to score a decisive and well-earned victory, 29 to 0."

The Panthers established their dominance early as they received the kick-0ff and advanced the ball to the Allegheny 10-yard line. Tom Parkinson fumbled and the Methodists recovered but the Pitt defense held and forced a punt. Pitt regained possession on the Allegheny 38-yard line and Josh Williams, Rooney and Parkinson alternated running the ball to the one yard line. "Williams smashed over from the one on fourth down." Rooney botched the point after. Pitt 6 to Allegheny 0. At the start of the second stanza Pitt pinned the Methodists deep in their territory with a punt to the 9-yard line. The Pitt defense held and forced a punt. Pitt guard Albert DiMeolo blocked Garbark's punt into the end zone and Joe Donchess recovered for a touchdown. Rooney tacked on the extra point and Pitt led 13–0. Pitt kicked off and their defense again held the Methodists deep in their territory. Garback's punt was blocked by Pitt tackle Charles Tully, but Garbark was able to cover it in the end zone for a safety. Pitt led 15–0. Late in the half Rooney intercepted Nick Verano's pass at midfield and carried it to the Methodists 29-yard line. Five running plays carried the ball to the 2-yard line. "Parkinson smashed over for the score at right guard." Rooney's placement split the uprights and Pitt led at the half 22 to 0. The second half was a punting duel until the mid-fourth quarter when Pitt end Albert Guarino intercepted a pass by Allegheny halfback Dennison on the Methodist 29-yard line. William Walinchus replaced Parkinson at fullback and carried the ball five times, the last being a one yard scoring plunge into the end zone. Toby Uansa converted the point and Pitt won 29 to 0. Allegheny finished the season with a 4–3–1 record.

The Pitt starting lineup for the game against Allegheny was Joe Donchess (left end), Charles Tully (left tackle), Alex Fox (left guard), Ray Montgomery (center), Albert DiMeolo (right guard), Mike Getto (right tackle), Albert Guarino (right end), Charles Edwards (quarterback), James Rooney (left halfback), Josh Williams (right halfback) and Tom Parkinson (fullback). Substitutes appearing in the game for Pitt were William Walinchus, Jesse Crissinger, Toby Uansa, Edward Baker, Markley Barnes, Ernest Lewis, Arthur Corson and Reginald Bowen.

=== Carnegie Tech ===
Week 5: Carnegie Tech at Pitt

| Team | 1 | 2 | 3 | 4 | Total |
|---|---|---|---|---|---|
| • Carnegie Tech | 0 | 0 | 0 | 6 | 6 |
| Pitt | 0 | 0 | 0 | 0 | 0 |

- Date: October 27, 1928
- Location: Pitt Stadium
  Pittsburgh, PA
- Game start: 2:30 p.m.
- Game attendance: 45,000
- Game weather: rain
- Referee: J. H. Moffatt (Princeton)

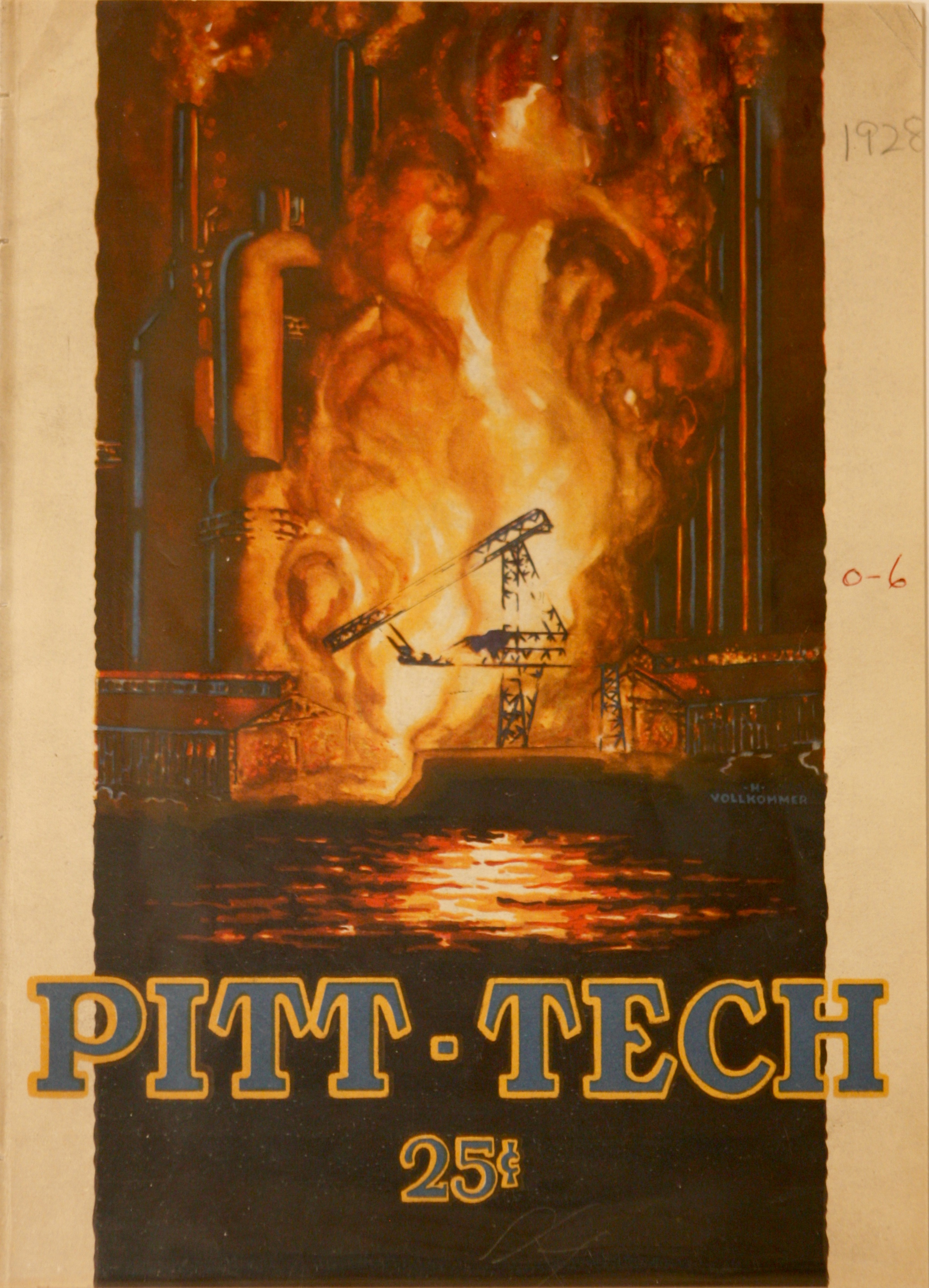
Program for October 27, 1928 Pitt vs. Carnegie Tech game

"Western Pennsylvania's greatest football spectacle will be the attraction at the stadium Saturday, appropriately designated 'Pittsburgh Day,' by recent action of the city council, when Pitt and Carnegie Tech meet for the fifteenth annual city championship game." Tech is the favorite for the first time in the 15 game series history. The Tech eleven handled their three minor opponents (Westminster, Ashland and Thiel) easily and then shut out Washington & Jefferson 19–0 to earn their 4–0 record. The Tartan lineup boasted three All-Americans – quarterback Howard Harpster, end Theodore Rosenzweig and guard John Dreshar.

Pitt held a commanding edge in the series 11–3 but the Tartans won 3 of the past 5. Coach Sutherland had to rearrange the backfield lineup due to Tom Parkinson's broken ribs. He started Edward Baker at quarterback and moved Charles Edwards to fullback.

"The Pittsburgh city football championship banner was carried back to the other side of Forbes Street last night in the gloom of a murky afternoon. Carnegie Tech vanquished Pitt in as thrilling and hard-fought an engagement as has ever been presented in Pitt stadium, but the Plaid takes little more glory from her 6 to 0 triumph than does the snarling Panther."

The Pitt offense moved the ball but could not capitalize with a score. The Panthers had possession in Tech territory most of the first period. They had first down on the Tech 37-yard line but ended up punting. The next drive went to the Tartan 24-yard line and Baker fumbled. In the second quarter Mike Getto recovered a Tech fumble on the Tartan 23-yard line. Pitt lost the ball on downs. The Plaid then proceeded to advance the ball to the Panther 26-yard line where Baker intercepted Howard Harpster's pass to stop the drive. Score at halftime: Pitt 0 to Tech 0. At the start of the third quarter the Pitt defense forced a punt and the offense drove the ball to the Tech 11-yard line. The Tartan defense stiffened and regained possession on downs at their 16-yard line. Tech fumbled on first down and Getto recovered for Pitt on the Tech 24-yard line. Seven plays later Edwards missed a 20 yard field goal attempt and Tech started “the drive” from their 20-yard line. The third period ended with the ball on the Tech thirty-yard line first and ten. A running play followed by a pass from Harpster to Rosenzweig resulted in first down at the Pitt 47-yard line. Five straight running plays advanced the pigskin to the Pitt 29-yard line. On first down Harpster found Harvey Shaughency wide open for a 27 yard pass completion to the Pitt 2-yard line. "Tech was not to be denied" as Harpster plunged over for the touchdown on third down. Cyril Letzelter missed the point but Tech was City Champion for the fourth time in the past six years.

The Pitt starting lineup for the game against Carnegie Tech was Joe Donchess (left end), Charles Tully (left tackle), Alex Fox (left guard), Ray Montgomery (center), Albert DiMeolo (right guard), Mike Getto (right tackle), Albert Guarino (right end), Edward Baker (quarterback), Toby Uansa (left halfback), Josh Williams (right halfback) and Charles Edwards (Fullback). Substitutes appearing in the game for Pitt were William Walinchus and Frank Hood.

=== Syracuse ===
Week 6: Syracuse at Pitt

| Team | 1 | 2 | 3 | 4 | Total |
|---|---|---|---|---|---|
| Syracuse | 0 | 0 | 0 | 0 | 0 |
| • Pitt | 6 | 0 | 12 | 0 | 18 |

- Date: November 3, 1928
- Location: Pitt Stadium
  Pittsburgh, PA
- Game start: 2:00 p.m.
- Game weather: rain, muddy field
- Referee: W. G. Crowell (Swarthmore)

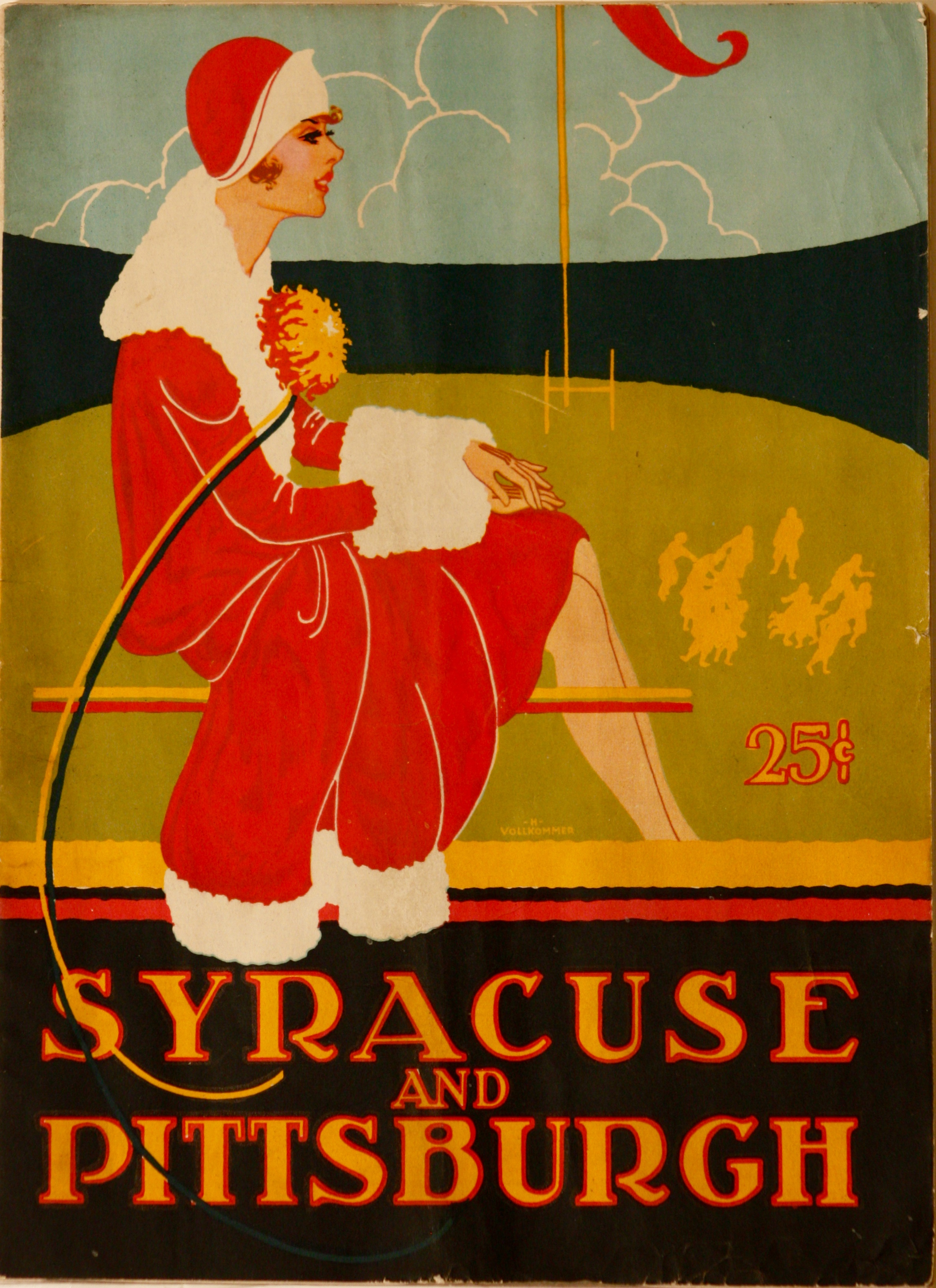
Program for November 3, 1928 Pitt vs. Syracuse game

Second year coach Lew Andreas brought his Syracuse Orange eleven to Pitt stadium for the first time on November 3. The last time the Panthers and Orange met was 1924 in Syracuse when the teams battled to a 7–7 tie. Pitt led the all-time series 4–2–2. The Orange had a 3–1–1 record on the season. They dispensed with their first three opponents easily but then lost a tight game (7–6) at Nebraska and tied Penn State (6–6) at State College. The Pittsburgh Press warned: “Capt. Hal Baysinger will lead his crack Syracuse team against Pitt's Panthers at the stadium Saturday, and if the big Orange team plays as it did against the Nebraska Cornhuskers a week ago, the Panthers are due for a long afternoon. Baysinger threw 32 aerials and completed 16 of them, one for a touchdown.”

Starting fullback Tom Parkinson was still nursing his ribs and was unable to play, so Coach Sutherland went with the same backfield that faced Carnegie Tech.

The Rochester Democrat and Chronicle was blunt in its assessment: "Syracuse University was handed an 18-to-0 defeat here today by the University of Pittsburgh, the Panther having outplayed the New Yorkers in every department of the game. Pitt's winning qualities were manifest in both the backfield and on the line, while Syracuse's aerial game, centering around Captain Baysinger, was more or less a dud."

Pitt received the kick-off and returned it to their 32-yard line. Five running plays and a short pass advanced the ball to the Syracuse 47-yard line. "(Josh) Williams got loose at right end and raced 47 yards to a touchdown. Stevens had challenged him on the 20 yard stripe but Williams gave him a beautiful straight arm. Uansa missed the extra point from placement." Pitt led 6 to 0. Syracuse threatened twice in the first half but the Pitt defense held and turned the ball over on downs. The Panthers scored a touchdown late in the half, but were offside and lost the ball on downs on the Syracuse 1-yard line. The Pitt offense spent the third period in Syracuse territory. On their first possession they lost the ball on downs on the Orange 7-yard line. On their second possession they advanced the ball to the Syracuse 4-yard line and fumbled. After an exchange of punts, Toby Uansa intercepted Baysinger's pass and carried it to the Syracuse 22-yard line. On second down - "On a perfect play where the Pitt interference blocked out every Syracuse man, Williams cut through right tackle for 18 and a touchdown." Uansa missed the point after and Pitt led 12 to 0. The Pitt defense forced a punt and gained possession on the Syracuse 39-yard line. Charles Edwards gained 3, Williams galloped 21 and Uansa gained 3 to the 13-yard line. "On a deceptive double pass play, Uansa threw a forward pass to (Joe) Donchess, who was loose over the goal line for a touchdown." With substitutes dominating both lineups, the fourth period was scoreless. Syracuse finished the season with a 4–4–1 record.

Jock Sutherland spoke to the Sun-Telegraph: "Syracuse has traveled nearly 4,000 miles in the last two weeks and deserves all the credit in the world. They played hard today, but were tired and worn. Our boys were in good shape and I think our line deserves a lot of credit. I do not think we looked as well as we did against Tech, however. Don't disparage Syracuse; they have a good team."

The Pitt starting lineup for the game against Syracuse was Joe Donchess (left end), Charles Tully (left tackle), Alex Fox (left guard), Ray Montgomery (center), Albert DiMeolo (right guard), Mike Getto (right tackle), Albert Guarino (right end), Edward Baker (quarterback), Toby Uansa (left halfback), Josh Williams (right halfback) and Charles Edwards (fullback). Substitutes appearing in the game for Pitt were Arthur Corson, James Scanlon, William Walinchus, James Rooney, Reginald Bowen, William Loehr, Ernest Lewis, Bucky Wagner, Markley Barnes, Jesse Crissinger, Frank Hood, Felix Wilps, Nevin Faw, Philip Goldberg and Paul Greenberger.

=== Washington & Jefferson ===
Week 7: Washington & Jefferson at Pitt

| Team | 1 | 2 | 3 | 4 | Total |
|---|---|---|---|---|---|
| Washington & Jefferson | 0 | 0 | 0 | 0 | 0 |
| • Pitt | 0 | 6 | 6 | 13 | 25 |

- Date: November 10, 1928
- Location: Pitt Stadium
  Pittsburgh, PA
- Game start: 2:00 p.m.
- Game attendance: 14,000
- Game weather: snow & rain
- Referee: E. C. Taggart (Rochester)

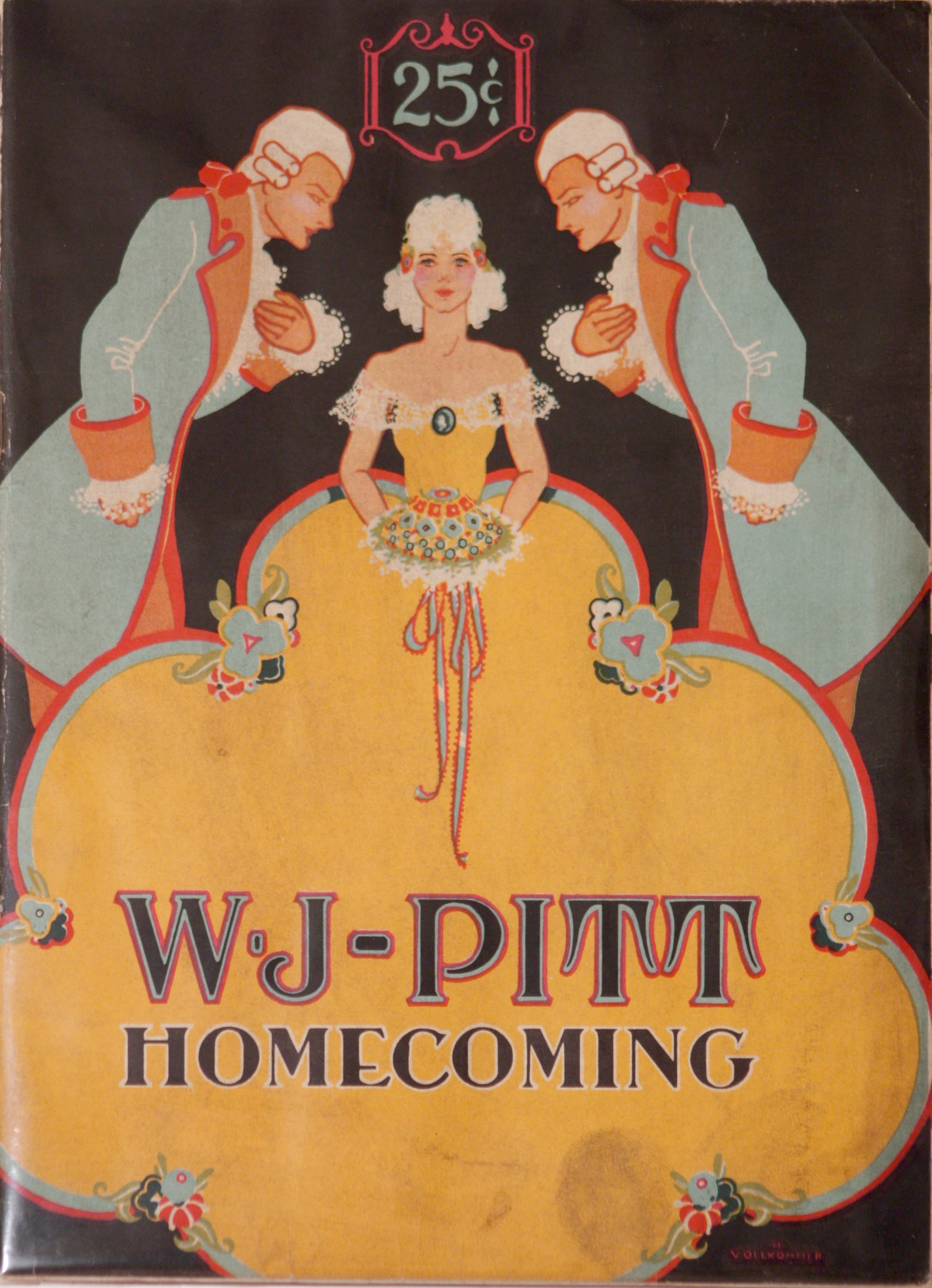
Program for November 10, 1928 Pitt vs. W. & J. Homecoming game

Washington & Jefferson, Pitt's oldest rival, was chosen as the opponent for the first University of Pittsburgh Homecoming game. The Presidents and Panthers each had 13 victories in the series and battled to a scoreless tie the past two seasons. The Presidents led by third-year coach Andy Kerr were having an off year with a record of 2–3–1, but were encouraged by the 13–13 tie with Lafayette in their previous game. "Coach Kerr has pointed for the Pitt game all season. He has risked defeat by holding his best men out of the last two games to have them in shape for the Panthers." Captain Carl Aschman and All-American tackle Forrest Douds anchors of the Presidents' line are "two of the greatest linemen ever turned out in this district."

The Panthers came through the Syracuse victory unscathed injury-wise, so Coach Sutherland started the same lineup against the Presidents.

W. D. Harrison, director of athletics, addressed the alumni in the game program:

"This is the first football game to be set aside as a Homecoming game. Many of the alumni are with us today. We welcome them back to the University and to the Stadium. It is their University and their Stadium. We hope that as years go by, more and more of them will come back to say hello to us and to watch their teams play. To win and to succeed, we need their help. And we know that we can count on that help. Therefore, we say welcome not only for this Homecoming game but for the countless ones to come."

"The University of Pittsburgh defeated Washington and Jefferson College 25 to 0 this afternoon, in the stadium. The Washingtonians were completely outclassed by the Golden Panthers and were able to make but one first down during the game. This came late in the last period when Coach Sutherland's second stringers were playing on the line."

The first quarter was a punting duel on the snow-covered field. Early in the second period Tom Parkinson replaced Charles Edwards at fullback and Edwards replaced Edward Baker at his regular quarterback position and the offense was able to advance the ball. Pitt gained possession on their 28-yard line. On first down "Parkinson broke through right tackle and ran to the Wash. & Jeff. 24, a gain of 48 yards." Four rushes moved the ball to the 8-yard line and Josh "Williams broke through a hole at right tackle and with fine blocking on the part of his mates, crossed the goal line without a hostile tackler touching him." A bad snap botched the extra point. Pitt led at halftime 6 to 0. Early in the third stanza Pitt blocked a W. & J. punt and Joe Donchess recovered on the Presidents 13-yard line. Toby Uansa gained 4 yards on first down. Parkinson carried the ball five straight plays, finally plunging over from the one inch line for the second touchdown of the game. The extra point attempt was an incomplete pass. Pitt 12 to W. & J. 0. Late in the quarter Pitt gained possession on the W. & J. 41-yard line. When time expired the Panthers had the ball on the Presidents 3-yard line. First play of the final stanza, "Uansa slid off left tackle for a touchdown. Edwards place-kicked the extra point." Pitt led 19 to 0. In the waning moments of the contest James Rooney scampered 14 yards for the final score of the day. Rooney's placement was blocked. The Panthers won their first Homecoming game 25 to 0.

Coach Kerr of the Presidents praised the Panthers: "They're a great team, those Panthers. We were outplayed, but I know that our boys played as well as they knew how. We were simply outclassed." The Presidents finished the season with a 2–5–2 record.

The Pitt starting lineup for the game against Washington & Jefferson was Joe Donchess (left end), Charles Tully (left tackle), Alex Fox (left guard), Ray Montgomery (center), Albert DiMeolo (right guard), MikeGetto (right tackle), Albert Guarino (right end), Edward Baker (quarterback), Toby Uansa (left halfback), Josh Williams (right halfback) and Charles Edwards (fullback). Substitutes appearing in the game for Pitt were Tom Parkinson, James Rooney, William Walinchus, William Loehr, James Scanlon, Ernest Lewis, Reginald Bowen, Bucky Wagner, Arthur Corson, Markley Barnes, Frank Hood, Jesse Crissinger, Philip Goldberg, Paul Greenberger and Felix Wilps.

=== At Nebraska ===
Week 8: Pitt at Nebraska

| Team | 1 | 2 | 3 | 4 | Total |
|---|---|---|---|---|---|
| Pitt | 0 | 0 | 0 | 0 | 0 |
| Nebraska | 0 | 0 | 0 | 0 | 0 |

- Date: November 17, 1928
- Location: Memorial Stadium (Lincoln)
  Lincoln, NE
- Game start: 2:00 p.m.
- Game attendance: 23,000
- Game weather: sloppy field
- Referee: Leslie Edmonds (Washburn)

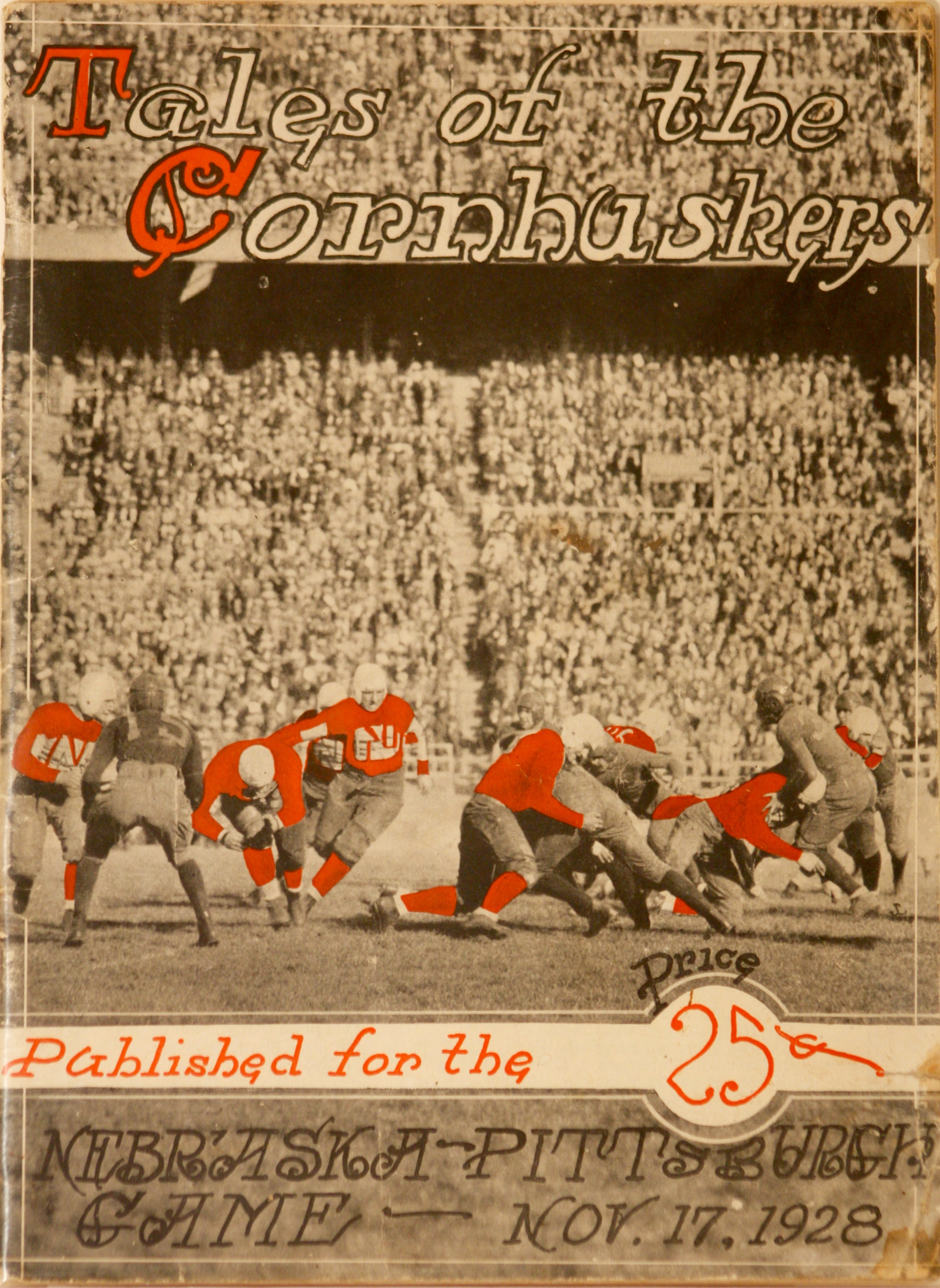
Program for November 17, 1928 Nebraska vs. Pitt game

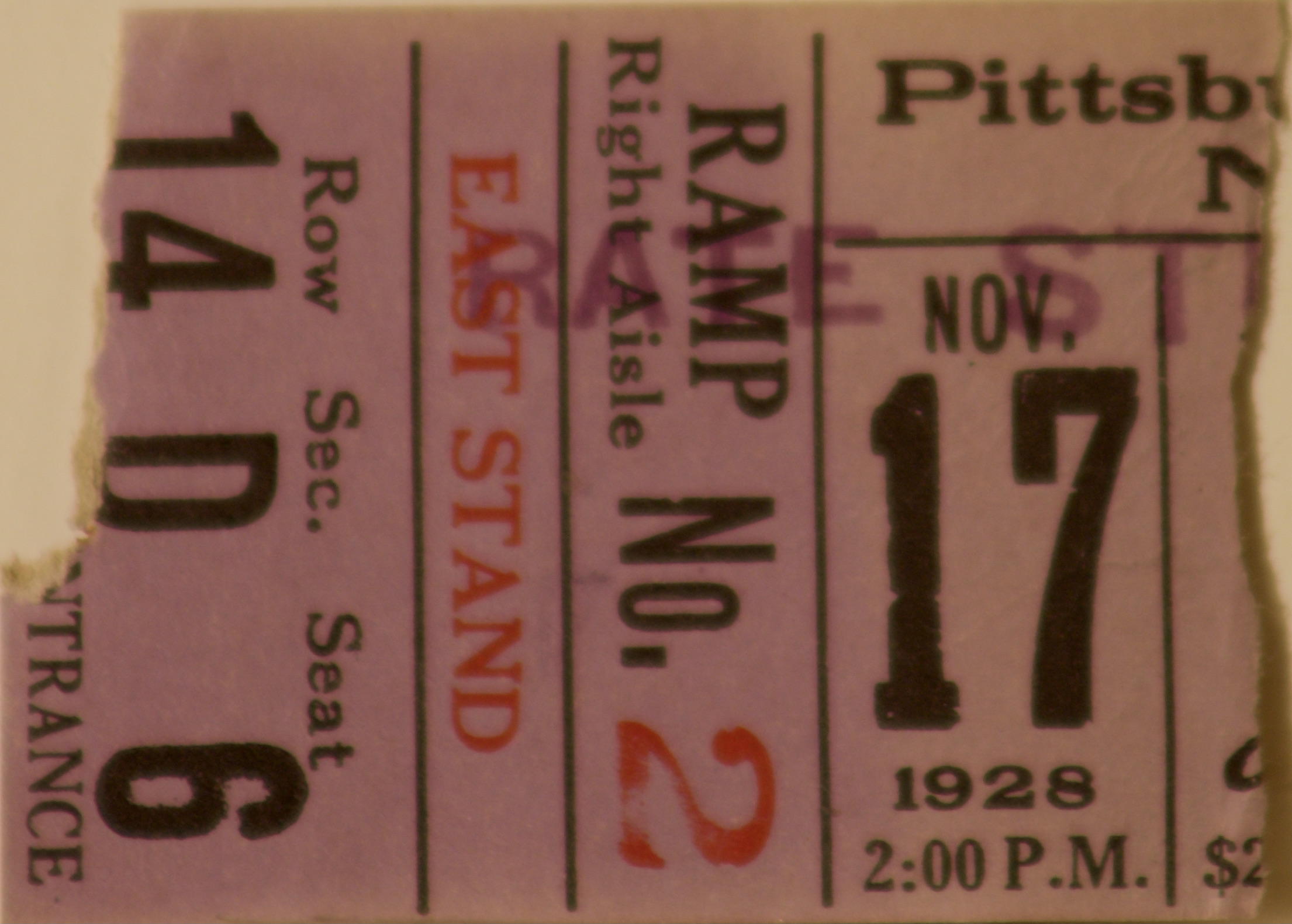
Ticket Stub for November 17, 1928 Nebraska vs. Pitt game

Twenty-eight Panthers left Pittsburgh Wednesday (November 14) night on the train headed for Chicago. A workout was arranged at the University of Chicago's Stagg Field on Thursday afternoon. Thursday evening the entourage entrained for Omaha, Nebraska, where Friday the Panthers held their practice indoors due to inclement weather conditions. Saturday morning they arrived in Lincoln to battle the undefeated Nebraska Cornhuskers. The all-time series was tied at a game apiece, with Pitt winning last season 21 to 13.

"It will be just one year to the day that the Cornhuskers have waited for an opportunity to square accounts with Pitt, but a year is quite a while, at that, especially in Nebraska, where it is unlawful to lose football games." Fourth-year coach Ernest Bearg had his team 6–0 on the season and in contention for the national championship. The Cornhuskers lineup boasted two All-Americans - guard Danny McMullen and fullback Blue Howell.

Cy Sherman of The Lincoln Star was disappointed: "The whoop-las and the hur-rahs that hopeful Nebraskans were planning to let loose Saturday afternoon at the state university Memorial stadium will have to be reserved for another day. An undefeated and untied Cornhusker football team, in the front rank of the running for national championship laurels, stepped out in defense of its record against an exasperated outfit of Pitt U. Panthers and could get nothing better than a 0–0 tie." Harry Scott in his book Jock Sutherland noted: "The game against a superior Nebraska team, was rated as one of the great upsets of the year....Nebraska had been universally picked to win by three touchdowns, so it was more than a surprise when the Panthers sent the Cornhuskers home without even a first down to their credit."

The Panthers threatened to score in the second quarter, as they advanced the ball from the Nebraska 48-yard line to the 13-yard line, but turned the ball over on downs. Neither team was in scoring position for the remainder of the game. Nebraska did not attempt a forward pass and was out-rushed by the Panthers 175 yards to 52 yards. Pitt earned 8 first downs to 0 for the Huskers.

"The Cornhuskers played the game like an outfit of dead men," Coach Berg declared, following the fray. "They were completely down both mentally and physically, and were outgeneraled and out-talked in every period. I feared it was coming, as the strain of keeping the squad keyed up for five hard games was more than our men could stand. Pitt has a fine club and the Panthers played the game smartly." The Huskers finished the season with a 7–1–1 record.

The Pitt starting lineup for the game against Nebraska was Joe Donchess (left end), Charles Tully (left tackle), Alex Fox (left guard), Ray Montgomery (center), Albert DiMeolo (right guard), Mike Getto (right tackle), Albert Guarino (right end), Charles Edwards (quarterback), Toby Uansa (left halfback), Josh Williams (right halfback) and Tom Parkinson (fullback). No substitutes for Pitt were used in this game.

=== Penn State ===
Week 9: Penn State at Pitt

| Team | 1 | 2 | 3 | 4 | Total |
|---|---|---|---|---|---|
| Penn State | 0 | 0 | 0 | 0 | 0 |
| • Pitt | 7 | 7 | 6 | 6 | 26 |

- Date: November 29, 1928
- Location: Pitt Stadium
  Pittsburgh, PA
- Game start: 2:00 p.m.
- Referee: E. C. Taggart (Rochester)

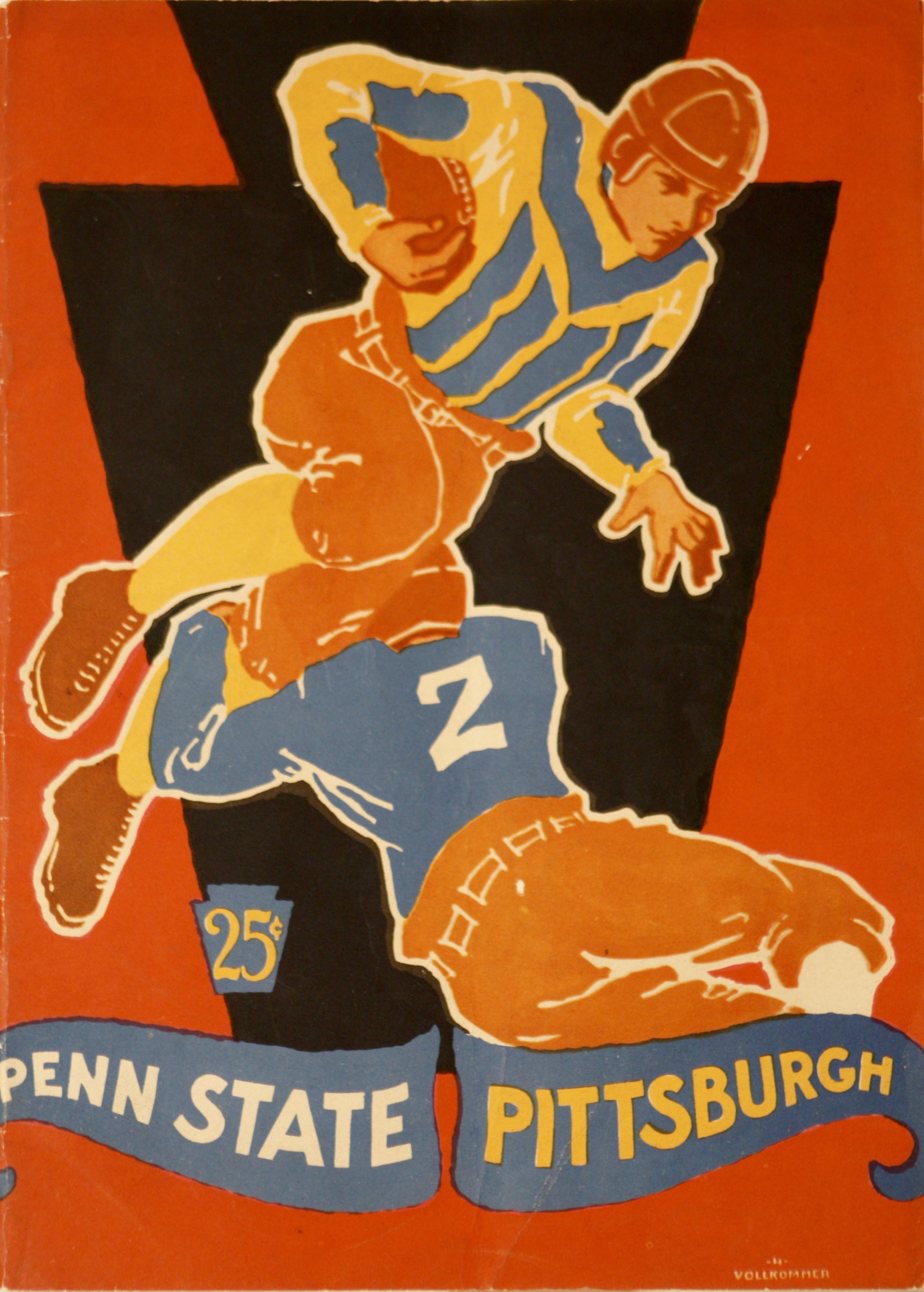
Program for November 29, 1928 Pitt vs. Penn State game

Pitt and Penn State met for the 31st time on Thanksgiving Day to end the 1928 football season. The Panthers led the series 15–12–3 and Penn State last won in 1919. Penn State's record was 3–4–1 due to an excessive number of injuries, but Coach Hugo Bezdek's Lions were in top form for the Panthers.

"The Golden Panthers were granted a two-day respite following their scoreless tie with Nebraska and are in excellent shape for the final engagement. Coach Sutherland will have his squad at peak strength for the game." Unlike last year when eight Panther starters suited up for the final time against Penn State, this year only three starters (Captain Alex Fox, end Albert Guarino and tackle Mike Getto) will play their final game as a Panther on Thanksgiving.

The Pitt Panthers continued their mastery over the Nittany Lions with a 26 to 0 drubbing at the stadium. Halfback Toby Uansa set the tone with a 100 yard return of the opening kick-off. "It was a brilliant piece of running, but only because of excellent interference." Charles Edwards converted the point after and Pitt led 7 to 0 after 15 seconds. In the second period the Panther offense marched 60 yards to pay dirt. Tom Parkinson plunged through left guard for the tally from the one foot line, and James Rooney converted the point after for a 14 to 0 Pitt lead at halftime. Penn State did not have a first down in the first half. Penn State had possession to start the third stanza, but Uansa intercepted Alfred Wolff's pass and Pitt had possession on the State 48-yard line. On second down Uansa scampered 44 yards for his second touchdown. Edwards missed the point after and Pitt led 20–0 after three quarters. Coach Sutherland made wholesale substitutions in the final period. The final touchdown came after State quarterback Joseph Miller fumbled a punt and William Walinchus recovered on the State 22-yard line. Six running plays advanced the ball to the one and Frank Hood "flung himself over for a touchdown." Uansa missed the placement and Pitt beat Penn State 26 to 0 for their seventh straight victory in the series. Penn State wrapped up their season with a 3–5–1 record.

The Pitt starting lineup for the game against Penn State was Joe Donchess (left end), Charles Tully (left tackle), Alex Fox (left guard), Ray Montgomery (center), Albert DiMeolo (right guard), Mike Getto (right tackle), Albert Guarino (right end), Charles Edwards (quarterback), Toby Uansa (left halfback), Josh Williams (right halfback) and Tom Parkinson (fullback). Substitutes appearing in the game for Pitt were Arthur Corson, Edward Baker, James Rooney, Felix Wilps, Ernest Lewis, James Scanlon, William Walinchus, Markley Barnes, Frank Hood, Bucky Wagner, William Loehr, Philip Goldberg, Paul Greenberger and Reginald Bowen.

Ralph Davis, sports editor of The Pittsburgh Press penned a prophetic column after watching the game: "Will the time come when the Panthers will give the Pittsburgh public some other attraction than State College on Turkey Day?" was his main theme. "Unkind as it may sound, it is nevertheless a fact that the Center countians are not the drawing card they used to be on the Pitt schedule...It is no secret that the football public is not looking for walkovers. It wants games that are real battles, especially on a holiday...State hasn't won since 1919. Since then she has twice held the Panthers to scoreless ties, and on seven other occasions she has been rather badly beaten...Since 1912 Pitt has beaten State 13 times, lost one and played two ties. In that period the locals have tallied a total of 289 points, and State has made but 54.... It was really astounding to an old follower of football, to note the lack of color and deadness of the crowd."

== Scoring summary ==
1928 Pittsburgh Panthers scoring summary
| Player | Touchdowns | Extra points | Field goals | Safety | Points |
|---|---|---|---|---|---|
| Josh Williams | 7 | 0 | 0 | 0 | 42 |
| Toby Uansa | 6 | 2 | 0 | 0 | 38 |
| Tom Parkinson | 5 | 0 | 0 | 0 | 30 |
| Felix Wilps | 3 | 0 | 0 | 0 | 18 |
| Joe Donchess | 2 | 0 | 0 | 0 | 12 |
| James Rooney | 1 | 6 | 0 | 0 | 12 |
| Philip Goldberg | 1 | 0 | 0 | 0 | 6 |
| Frank Hood | 1 | 0 | 0 | 0 | 6 |
| William Walinchus | 1 | 0 | 0 | 0 | 6 |
| Charles Edwards | 0 | 5 | 0 | 0 | 5 |
| team | 0 | 0 | 0 | 1 | 2 |
| Totals | 27 | 13 | 0 | 1 | 177 |

== Postseason ==
All-American tackle Mike Getto was chosen to play in the December 29, 1928 East-West Shrine Bowl in San Francisco.

On December 2, 1928, athletic director W. D. Harrison announced the 1929 football schedule. Three away games ( Nebraska, Duke, Allegheny) and six home games (Waynesburg, West Virginia, Ohio State, Washington & Jefferson, Carnegie Tech, Penn State) gave the Panther fans an attractive slate of games to look forward to.

The following players were awarded their letter by the athletic council at the team banquet: Captain Alex Fox, Tom Parkinson, Charles Edwards, Josh Williams, Toby Uansa, Ray Montgamery, Albert DiMeolo, Mike Getto, Charles Tully, Philip Goldberg, Joe Donchess, Albert Guarino, James Scanlon, Edward Baker, William Walinchus, Markley Barnes, Arthur Corson, James Rooney and manager Dave Stewart. The lettermen then chose guard Albert DiMeolo captain for the 1929 season.

=== All-American selections ===
Mike Getto - tackle (1st team Collier's Weekly (Grantland Rice); 1st team Newspaper Enterprise Association by Henry Farrell; 2nd team Associated Press; 2nd team United Press by Frank Getty; 1st team Intersectional Board of Coaches; 1st team Lawrence Perry, New York sportswriter)

Joe Donchess – end (2nd team Intersectional Board of Coaches; 1st team Lawrence Perry, New York sportswriter; Honorable Mention Associated Press) College Football Hall Of Fame

Alex Fox - guard (3rd team Intersectional Board of Coaches;)

Albert DiMeolo – guard (Honorable Mention Associated Press)

Tom Parkinson - fullback (Honorable Mention Associated Press)

Bold = Consensus All-American
