= Latto (name) =

Latto is a Scottish name, usually a surname, and is a variation of the name Latta. Notable people with the name include:

- Latto, stage name of American rapper Alyssa Stephens
- Bill Latto (1897–1962), American football coach
- Gordon Latto (1911–1998), Scottish doctor, nutritionist, naturopath, and activist
- Gordon Latto (born 1958), British ice hockey player
- Pauline Latto, British paralympic athlete
- Zena Latto (1925–2016), American jazz clarinetist and saxophonist
