= Kirk Pearson =

Kirk Pearson may refer to:

- Kirk Pearson (soccer), American soccer goalkeeper
- Kirk Pearson (politician), member of the Washington State Senate
- Kirk Pearson, candidate in the 2010 United States House of Representatives elections in Utah
