= Josh Gabriel (footballer) =

Grenadian footballer (born 1999)

Personal information
- Full name: Josh Patrick Gabriel
- Date of birth: 30 November 1999 (age 26)
- Place of birth: The Lime, Grenada
- Height: 1.88 m (6 ft 2 in)
- Position: Winger

Team information
- Current team: St. David's FC

College career
Years	Team	Apps	(Gls)
2021	Alderson Broaddus Battlers	4	(0)

Senior career*
Years	Team	Apps	(Gls)
2016–2017	South Stars		
2017–	GBSS		
2022–2023	Davis & Elkins Senators		
2024–2025	SV Wilhelmshaven	13	(0)
2025–	St. David's FC		

International career^{‡}
2018	Grenada U20	4	(0)
2019–	Grenada	19	(0)
- * Club domestic league appearances and goals as of 01:08, 28 July 2025 (UTC) ‡ National team caps and goals as of 01:08, 28 July 2025 (UTC)

Josh Patrick Gabriel (born 30 November 1999) is a Grenadian professional footballer who plays as a winger for the St. David's FC and the Grenada national team.

== International career ==
Gabriel made his debut with the Grenada in 0–0 friendly tie with Barbados on 4 March 2019. He was called up to represent Grenada at the 2021 CONCACAF Gold Cup.
