= Travis Everhart =

American football coach (born c. 1977)

Current position
- Title: Associate head coach & offensive line coach
- Team: Morehead State
- Conference: PFL

Biographical details
- Born: c. 1977 (age 48–49); Frankfort, Ohio, U.S.
- Education: Capital University (1999); California University of Pennsylvania (2001); Kent State University (2010)

Playing career
- 1995–1998: Capital
- Positions: Nose tackle, long snapper

Coaching career (HC unless noted)
- 1999: Capital (RB)
- 2000–2001: California (PA) (TE/assistant OL)
- 2002–2003: Tiffin (OL)
- 2004: Unioto HS (OH)
- 2005: South Dakota Mines (OL)
- 2006: Louisburg (OC/QB/WR)
- 2007–2008: Hiram (OC/OL)
- 2009: Kent State (assistant OL)
- 2010–2011: West Virginia Tech (OC/OL)
- 2012: Point (OC/OL)
- 2013–2014: Charleston (WV) (ST/TE/FB)
- 2015: Charleston (WV) (ST/WR)
- 2016: Fort Valley State (OC/OL)
- 2017: West Virginia State (co-OC/OL)
- 2018: Fort Valley State (OC/OL)
- 2019: Fort Valley State (assoc. HC/ST/DL)
- 2020–2022: Alderson Broaddus
- 2023: Fairmont State (OL)
- 2024–present: Morehead State (assoc. HC/OL)

Head coaching record
- Overall: 1–25 (college); 1–9 (high school)

Travis Everhart (born c. 1977) is an American college football coach. He is the associate head coach and offensive line coach for Morehead State University, a position he has held since 2024. He was the head football coach for Alderson Broaddus University, a position he held from 2020 to 2022 when the school ended all athletic programs. He previously coached for Capital, California (PA), Tiffin, Unioto High School, South Dakota Mines, Louisburg, Hiram, Kent State, West Virginia Tech, Point, Charleston, Fort Valley State, West Virginia State, and Fairmont State. He played college football for Capital as a nose tackle and long snapper.

== Head coaching record ==
=== College ===
Year	Team	Overall	Conference	Standing	Bowl/playoffs
Alderson Broaddus Battlers (Mountain East Conference) (2020–2022)
2020–21	Alderson Broaddus	0–4	0–4	5th (North)	
2021	Alderson Broaddus	1–10	1–9	11th	
2022	Alderson Broaddus	0–11	0–10	12th	
Alderson Broaddus:		1–25	1–23		
Total:		1–25			

=== High school ===
Year	Team	Overall	Conference	Standing	Bowl/playoffs
Unioto Shermans (Scioto Valley Conference) (2004)
2004	Unioto	1–9	1–6	7th	
Unioto:		1–9	1–6		
Total:		1–9			
