= Steve Willis (pastor) =

American Baptist minister

Steve Willis is a Baptist pastor in the United States and national health activist. He was described as the "Apostle of Health" by Charisma magazine, and is best known nationally for his efforts to curb childhood obesity, as well as for his role on ABC Television's Emmy award winning series Jamie Oliver's Food Revolution. He is currently the Senior Pastor of the One Church Network, and the lead teaching pastor of their Calvary campus in Murfreesboro, TN.

== Early life and education ==
Willis was born and raised in Kanawha County, West Virginia, and has called the state home for most of his adult life as well.

He graduated from West Virginia University in 1991 and moved to Texas to complete his Master's in Divinity soon after from Dallas Theological Seminary. Upon graduating in 1996, Willis returned to West Virginia to take a youth ministry position. He later earned a Ph.D. from Southern Baptist Theological Seminary and received an honorary Doctorate of Divinity from Alderson-Broaddus University.

== Career ==
Pastor Steve began his career as a youth pastor, coaching baseball, basketball, and football in both public and private schools. As a partner with the Fellowship of Christian Athletes in Wayne County, WV in the early 2000s, he led a ministry reaching over 800 teens on a weekly basis. In 2004, he began serving as Lead Pastor at the First Baptist Church in Kenova, WV extending his time on staff there for a total of 21 years.

After spending many years in full-time youth ministry, as a pastor for an entire congregation he began noticing the toll that obesity had on both the children and adults of his congregation. In 2009, his sermons on overall physical and spiritual health were featured nationally on CNN and KLove Radio and helped bring Jamie Oliver's Food Revolution to Huntington, West Virginia as they attempted to improve the health of the nation's most obese city.

Pastor Steve also travels extensively for the purpose of educating parents, teenagers, and pastors around the world. He is also on faculty at Tri-State Bible College in South Point, OH. He is actively involved in the "Try This" movement, an effort to promote health throughout Appalachia.

He was instrumental in passing the $4.5 billion Childhood Nutrition Act, the largest nutritional initiative in the history of the United States.

In 2012, he published Winning the Food Fight, a book chronicling the events leading up to his time with Jamie Oliver and the subsequent improvements to the overall health of the Huntington community. During the campaign he was a featured guest on CNN's Larry King Live, Good Morning America, The 700 Club and several other national news agencies.

In 2013, he collaborated with Pastor Rick Warren, Dr. Daniel Amen, Dr. Mark Hymen, exercise physiologist Sean Foye, and others to produce The Daniel Plan project. The Daniel Plan tradebook hit #1 on the New York Times bestseller list in 2013.

He has also served as Guest Chaplain for the United States House of Representatives, delivering the pre-election prayer for the 2012 General Election.

== Personal life ==
Willis lives in Murfreesboro with his wife Deanna. He has three children: Titus, Johnna, and Lucas.
