= Theodore S. Coberly =

United States Air Force general

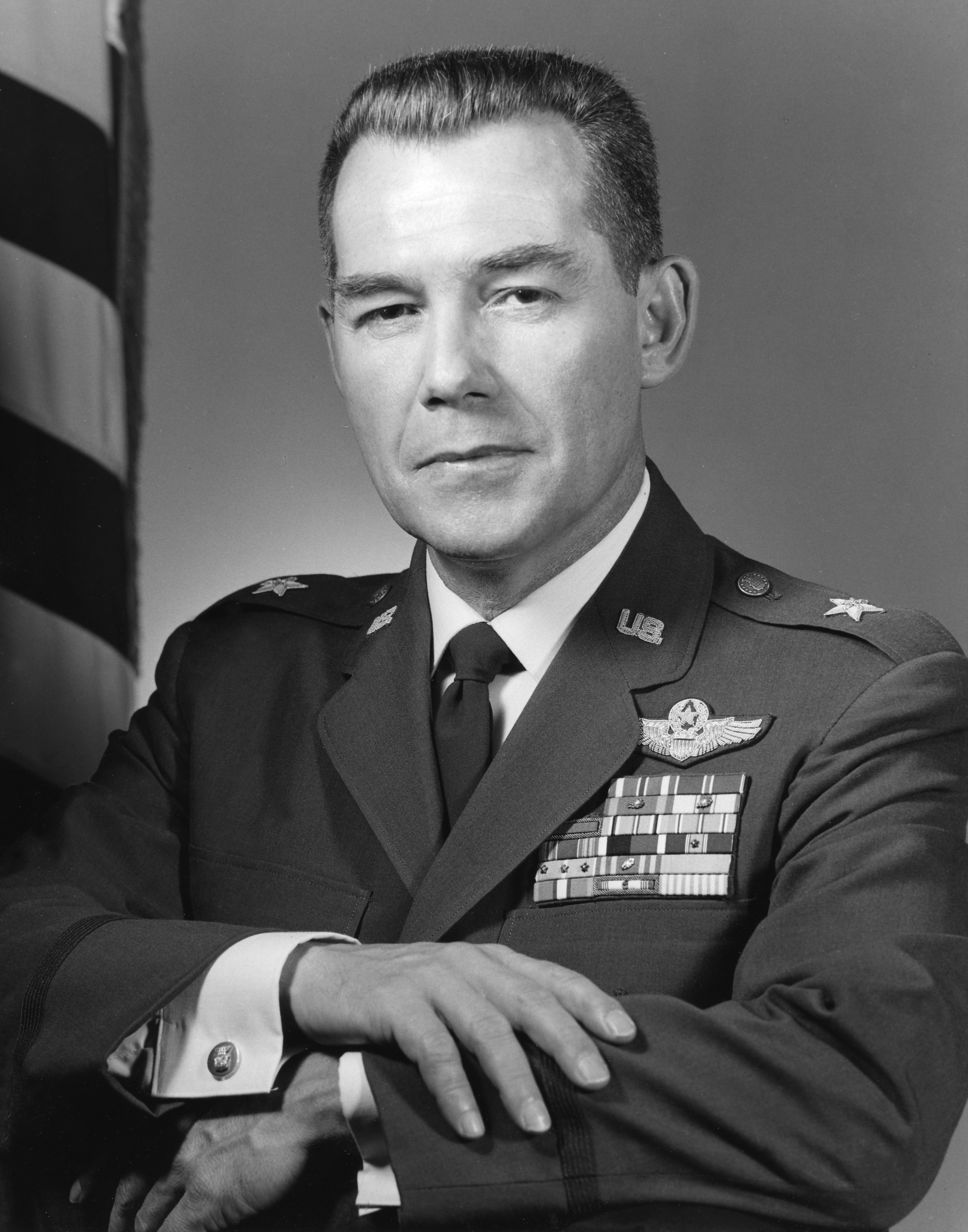
- Born: February 18, 1921; Morgantown, West Virginia
- Died: March 26, 2011 (aged 90); Monroe, Ohio
- Military career
- Allegiance: United States of America
- Branch: United States Air Force
- Service years: 1942–1972
- Rank: Brigadier general

Brigadier General Theodore Simpson Coberly (February 18, 1921 – March 26, 2011) was an American air force brigadier general who was director of reconnaissance and electronic warfare, deputy chief of staff, research and development, Headquarters U.S. Air Force, Washington, D.C.

== Early life ==
Coberly was born at Morgantown, West Virginia, in 1921, the son of James G.B. Coberly and Edith Simpson Coberly. He is a descendant of Edward Doty, a passenger of the Mayflower and one of the signers of the Mayflower Compact, through Doty's son Joseph.

He attended Alderson-Broaddus College at Philippi, W.Va., and graduated from the University of Maryland with a Bachelor of Science degree in 1959. He entered active military service as an aviation cadet in the U.S. Army Air Corps in August 1942. In June 1943 he received his pilot wings and commission as second lieutenant.

== Career ==
During World War II, he served primarily as an instructor at the Advanced Instructors School at Foster Field, Texas, and director, gunnery training at Matagorda Island, Texas. In March 1946 he was assigned to the Far East Air Material Command and in June 1947 was transferred to the 36th Fighter Squadron, 8th Fighter Group, in Japan.

In July 1948 he returned to the United States and was assigned to administrative positions with the 1st Air Base Group, March Air Force Base, Calif., and in August 1950 was transferred to the 1st Fighter Group at George Air Force Base, Calif. During the Korean War from December 1951 to June 1952, Coberly served with the 334th Fighter Interceptor Squadron in Korea and became squadron commander.

He returned to the United States and from October 1952 to August 1955 held various positions with Sacramento Air Materiel Area headquarters at McClellan Air Force Base, Calif., and Headquarters Western Air Procurement District, Los Angeles, Calif. In August 1955 he entered the Air Command and Staff College, Maxwell Air Force Base, Ala.

In July 1956 Coberly was assigned to Headquarters U.S. Air Force in Washington, D.C., where he served in the Office of the Deputy Chief of Staff, Materiel, as project officer in the Weapons Systems Division. He entered the Air War College in August 1960. After graduation in July 1961, he went to Wright-Patterson Air Force Base and served with Headquarters Aeronautical Systems Division, Air Force Systems Command, as deputy director for operations; then as systems program director, F-105; and lastly as systems program director.

Coberly went to England in July 1966 and was assigned as vice commander, 10th Tactical Reconnaissance Wing, Royal Air Force, Alconbury, and became commander in May 1967. He returned to Washington, D.C., in August 1968 for a tour of duty with the Organization of the Joint Chiefs of Staff as deputy director for operations, National Military Command Center. In August 1969 he assumed command of the Defense Contract Administration Services Region, Defense Supply Agency, at Los Angeles, Calif.

Coberly returned to Headquarters U.S. Air Force in August 1970 and was named director of reconnaissance and electronic warfare, in the Office of the Deputy Chief of Staff, Research and Development.

His military decorations and awards include the Air Force Distinguished Service Medal, Legion of Merit, Distinguished Flying Cross, Bronze Star Medal, Air Medal with oak leaf cluster, Air Force Commendation Medal with two oak leaf clusters, Distinguished Unit Citation Emblem, Air Force Outstanding Unit Award Ribbon, and Republic of Korea Presidential Unit Citation Ribbon.

He was promoted to the temporary grade of brigadier general effective Oct. 1, 1968, with date of rank July 8, 1968. He died at his home in Monroe, Ohio, in 2011 and was buried in Arlington National Cemetery on July 18, 2011.
