= Prex Merrill =

American football player and coach (1884–1935)

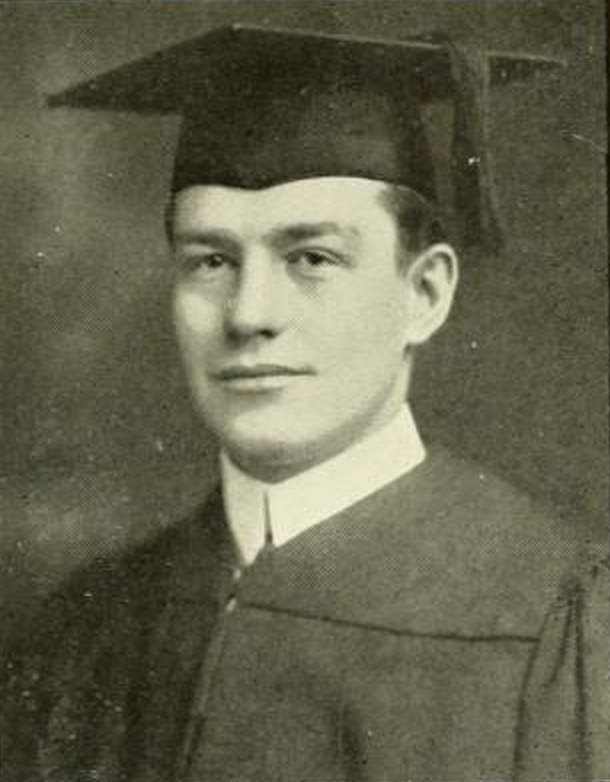
- Merrill pictured in Monticola 1913, West Virginia University yearbook

Biographical details
- Born: January 15, 1884; De Kalb Junction, New York, U.S.
- Died: February 23, 1935 (aged 51); Elkins, West Virginia, U.S.
- Education: Colgate University; West Virginia University; Yale University

Playing career
- 1909: West Virginia
- Position: Back

Coaching career (HC unless noted)
- 1910: Broaddus

Head coaching record
- Overall: 1–3

Austin Cook "Prex" Merrill (January 15, 1884 – February 23, 1935) was an American college football coach. He was the head football coach at Alderson–Broaddus College in Philippi, West Virginia for one season, in 1910, compiling a record of 1–3. Merrill also coached at Bethany College in West Virginia. He later worked as a lawyer.

Merrill attended West Virginia University, graduating in law in 1912 as well as Yale University, where he received his A.B. He was a member of the Phi Kappa Psi and Theta Nu Epsilon fraternities while at WVU.

Merrill died of a heart attack due to coronary thrombosis in 1935. At the time of his death, Merrill was serving as a Clerk for the U.S. District Court for Northern West Virginia.
