= Mel Merritt =

American football player and coach (1897–1986)

Biographical details
- Born: November 11, 1897; Middleton, Massachusetts, U.S.
- Died: August 22, 1986 (aged 88); Palm Beach, Florida, U.S.

Playing career

Football
- 1919–1920: Dartmouth

Baseball
- 1919–1921: Dartmouth
- Positions: End, guard (football); Catcher, pitcher (baseball)

Coaching career (HC unless noted)

Football
- 1926–1928: Allegheny
- 1929: Dartmouth (assistant)

Head coaching record
- Overall: 8–15–2

Melville Pettengill Merritt (November 11, 1897 – August 22, 1986) was an American college football player and coach. He served as the head football coach at Allegheny College in Meadville, Pennsylvania for three seasons, from 1926 until 1928, compiling a record of 8–15–2.

Merritt attended Dean Academy—now known as Dean College—in Franklin, Massachusetts before going to Dartmouth College. He played football as an End and guard at Dartmouth. He also captained the Dartmouth baseball, for which he played as a catcher and a pitcher. Merritt later played baseball for the Cornet All-Stars. He was hired as the head football coach at Allegheny in 1926. Merritt returned to Dartmouth in 1929 to assist Jackson Cannell with coaching the football team.

== Head coaching record ==
Year	Team	Overall	Conference	Standing	Bowl/playoffs
Allegheny Gators (Independent) (1926–1928)
1926	Allegheny	4–5			
1927	Allegheny	0–7–1			
1928	Allegheny	8–15–2			
Allegheny:		8–15–2			
Total:		8–15–2			
