= Furman Nuss =

American football and basketball coach (1895–1986)

Biographical details
- Born: February 2, 1895; Bristoria, Greene County, Pennsylvania, U.S.
- Died: February 5, 1986 (aged 91); Washington, Pennsylvania, U.S.

Playing career

Football
- late 1910s: Washington & Jefferson

Coaching career (HC unless noted)

Football
- 1924: Broaddus
- 1925–1928: Bethany (WV)
- c. 1942–1943: Washington & Jefferson (assistant)

Basketball
- 1925–1930: Bethany (WV)
- c. 1942–1943: Washington & Jefferson (assistant)

Head coaching record
- Overall: 10–25–7 (football); 53–29 (basketball)

Furman Leon "Fitz" Nuss (February 2, 1895 – February 5, 1986) was an American college football and college basketball coach. He served as the head football coach at Alderson–Broaddus College—now known as Alderson Broaddus University—in Philippi, West Virginia for one season, in 1924, compiling a record of 3–4–2.

Nuss graduated from Washington & Jefferson College in 1917.

== Later life ==
In his later life, Nuss operated a tire shop and worked in the gas drilling industry. He died on February 5, 1986, at the Hubert Lane Health Care Center in Washington, Pennsylvania, after a long illness.

== Head coaching record ==
=== Football ===
Year	Team	Overall	Conference	Standing	Bowl/playoffs
Broaddus Battlers (Independent) (1924)
1924	Broaddus	3–4–2			
Broaddus:		3–4–2			
Bethany Bison (Tri-State Conference) (1925–1928)
1925	Bethany	3–4–1	2–2–1	4th	
1926	Bethany	2–5–2	2–1–2	T–2nd	
1927	Bethany	1–6–1	1–1–1	T–4th	
1928	Bethany	1–6–1	0–2–1	4th	
Bethany:		7–21–5	5–6–5		
Total:		10–25–7			
