= Bill Latto =

American athlete, coach, and professor (1897–1962)

Biographical details
- Born: September 16, 1897; Uhrichsville, Ohio, U.S.
- Died: June 13, 1962 (aged 64); Uhrichsville, Ohio, U.S.
- Education: Bethany College, 1921

Playing career

Football
- 1916–1919: Bethany (WV)

Baseball
- c. 1920: Bethany (WV)
- Positions: Guard (football); Catcher (baseball)

Coaching career (HC unless noted)

Football
- 1922: Broaddus

Track and field
- 1925–?: Bethany (WV)

Head coaching record
- Overall: 3–3 (football)

William T. Latto (September 16, 1897 – June 13, 1962) was an American football player and coach and professor at Bethany College in West Virginia.

== Early years ==
Latto was born in 1897 in Uhrichsville, Ohio, and graduated from Urhichsville Hith School. He attended Bethany College in West Virginia. He played college football as a guard at Bethany for four years and was elected as the team's captain for the 1918 and 1919 seasons. He was the first player in the school's history to be selected captain of the football team for two seasons. He also played catcher for the Bethany baseball team.

== Coaching, military, and academic career ==
After graduating from Bethany, Latto coached the athletic teams at Vameron High School. Latto was also a veteran of World War I.

In August 1922, he was hired as the football coach at Broaddus College (now known as Alderson Broaddus University) in Philippi, West Virginia. He coached the Broaddus football team for one year, in 1922, compiling a record of 3–3.

In August 1923, Latto returned to his alma mater, Bethany College, as gymnasium instructor and freshman coach. He took coaching studies at the Springfield Y.M.C.A. School (now Springfield College) and Columbia University also became director of physical education and in 1925 took over as the school's track coach. He later also took on the responsibility as coach of Bethany's tennis team. He eventually became a professor at Bethany College. He also served during World War II as a field worker for the Red Cross.

== Family, later years, and death ==
Latto married Thelma Cornish in 1928. They had a son and a daughter.

In retirement, Latto returned to his hometown of Uhrischsville, Ohio. In 1961, Latto was named to Bethany's all-time college football team. He died in 1962 of complications of a heart attack.
