= Kirk Pearson (soccer) =

American soccer player

Personal information
- Date of birth: November 30, 1956 (age 69)
- Place of birth: Reading, Pennsylvania, U.S.
- Position: Goalkeeper

Youth career
- 1974–1977: Alderson–Broaddus College

Senior career*
Years	Team	Apps	(Gls)
1978–1979	New England Tea Men	7	(0)
- * Club domestic league appearances and goals

Kirk Pearson is an American retired soccer goalkeeper who played two seasons in the North American Soccer League.

Pearson attended Alderson–Broaddus College where he was a 1977 Honorable Mention (third team) All American soccer player. In January 1978, the expansion New England Tea Men selected Pearson in the North American Soccer League draft. He played only two games during the 1978 season, but saw five games at the beginning of the 1979 season when the first string goalkeeper Kevin Keelan broke his hand in the pre-season.
