= Richard F. Wilson =

American university president

Richard F. Wilson was selected to be Illinois Wesleyan University's 18th President on April 6, 2004 and took office on July 1, 2004. He was inaugurated on April 9, 2005. He had spent the previous 26 years at the University of Illinois at Urbana-Champaign, leaving as associate chancellor for development and vice president of the University of Illinois Foundation. Mr. Wilson received a Masters and Ph.D. in higher education from the University of Michigan. He received a bachelor's degree and honorary doctorate are from Alderson-Broaddus University in West Virginia. He is a member of both Phi Beta Kappa and Phi Kappa Phi national honor societies.

Wilson announced his intended retirement from Illinois Wesleyan, to take place around June 2015 or whenever a successor is named and transitioned.
