= Hunter Hardman =

American football coach

Biographical details
- Born: September 18, 1906; Marshall, West Virginia, U.S.
- Died: July 8, 1997 (aged 90); Columbus, Ohio, U.S.
- Education: Alderson Academy and Junior College

Playing career
- ?: Broaddus

Coaching career (HC unless noted)
- 1928–1930: Broaddus

Head coaching record
- Overall: 11–15–3

Dennis Hunter Hardman (September 18, 1906 – July 8, 1997) was an American college football coach. He served as the head football coach at Alderson–Broaddus College—now known as Alderson Broaddus University—in Philippi, West Virginia for three seasons, from 1928 to 1930, compiling a record of 11–15–3. He attended Broaddus College from 1925 to 1929.

Around 1970, Hardman was serving as chairman of the Marshall State University Athletic Committee as well as working as a professor at the school.
