= Alderson Broaddus University =

Private university in Philippi, West Virginia, US

- Former names: Pre-merger: Winchester Female Institute (1871-1876); Broaddus Female College (1876-1885); Broaddus College (1885-1894); Broaddus Classic and Scientific Institute (1894–1918); Broaddus College (1918–1932); Alderson Academy (1901–1909); Alderson Baptist Academy (1909-1918); Alderson Academy and Junior College (1918-1925); Alderson Junior College (1925-1932); Post-merger: Alderson-Broaddus College (1932–2013)
- Motto: "From the darkness into the light"
- Type: Private university
- Active: 1871–2023
- Religious affiliation: American Baptist Churches USA
- Location: Philippi, West Virginia, U.S. 39°09′30″N 80°02′57″W
- Campus: Rural
- Colors: Navy and gold
- Nickname: Battlers
- Sporting affiliations: NCAA Division II
- Mascot: Skirmish
- Website: www.ab.edu

Alderson Broaddus University (AB) was a private Baptist university in Philippi, West Virginia, United States. It was founded in 1871 and suspended its operations in 2023.

Alderson Broaddus University was historically affiliated with the American Baptist Churches USA. It was formed in 1932 as Alderson-Broaddus College by the union of two Baptist institutions: Alderson Junior College (founded 1901) and Broaddus College (founded 1871). The school adopted its final name in 2013.

Prior to the university's closing, its academics were organized into five academic divisions: the College of Health, Science, Technology, and Math; the College of Humanities, Education, and Social Sciences; the College of Business; the College of Medical Science; and the College of Adult and Distance Education. Alderson Broaddus was the first college in West Virginia to offer a four-year degree in nursing and the first in the country to offer a four-year physician assistant degree.

== History ==
The college's campus in the early 1930s

Alderson Broaddus University derived its name from the merging of two Baptist institutions in 1932. The older of the two, Broaddus Institute, was founded in Winchester, Virginia, in 1871 by Edward Jefferson Willis, a Baptist minister who named the new school after William Francis Ferguson Broaddus, a prominent Baptist minister at the time of the American Civil War. In response to economic hard times, Broaddus Institute was moved across the Allegheny Mountains to Clarksburg, West Virginia, in 1876. The college was moved again to the small town of Philippi in 1909. In 1918, it transitioned back to its former name Broaddus College.

The other institution, Alderson Academy, was founded in Alderson, West Virginia, in 1901 by Emma C. Alderson, a committed Baptist laywoman. Designed as a home school, it provided academic work in classics, sciences and normal studies. Originally supported by the Greenbrier Baptist Church, control was assumed by the West Virginia Baptist Association in 1910.

As the years passed, Broaddus became a junior college, then a senior college—first granting baccalaureate degrees in 1926—and Alderson Academy also added junior college status. Financial hardship in the late 1920s led to a decision to merge the two colleges, which shared common missions and outlooks as Baptist and liberal arts institutions; the merged institution, Alderson-Broaddus College, opened its doors in 1932. Since its founding, Alderson-Broaddus had been committed to a strong liberal arts education that seeks to imbue students with an appreciation of literature and the arts, Christian faith, music, and the sciences. In more recent times, the college was focused on developing programs in the natural and applied sciences as well. In 1945, Alderson-Broaddus developed the first four-year nursing and the first radiologic technology programs in West Virginia.

A portion of the physical assets of Storer College, a historically black Baptist college founded in 1865 in Harpers Ferry, West Virginia, were transferred to Alderson-Broaddus in 1964 and used to fund the "Storer Scholarship" given annually to an African-American student. In 1968, the college pioneered the nation's first four-year physician assistant (PA) program, an innovation that had significant influence on the development of the PA profession nationwide. From this program emerged in 1991 the college's first graduate degree offering, the Physician Assistant Master's program.

In 2011, the college chose Richard Creehan as president. Creehan embarked on a plan to expand the college and the institution increased enrollment by over 600 students, expanded the athletic department, and added many new academic programs. In 2013, the college's board of governors renamed the institution to Alderson Broaddus University. That same year, the institution matriculated the largest incoming freshman class in school history. In June 2017, the Higher Learning Commission put the University on probation because it determined that the institution was at risk due to financial difficulties. In 2019, it was no longer on probation, due to improved financial performance.

On July 31, 2023, the West Virginia Higher Education Policy Commission revoked Alderson Broaddus University's ability to confer degrees after the end of 2023 and ordered to it cease admitting students so it can begin to close. The commission stated that the "University's financial condition renders the institution unable to create a stable, effective, and safe learning environment for its students". The state's governor, Jim Justice, worked to help the university stay open and resolve its financial challenges, but they were so significant that the university had failed to pay its recent utility bills. On the same day, the university's board of trustees voted to close the university. On August 31, 2023, the campus filed for Chapter 7 bankruptcy liquidation.

== Campus ==
The Burbick Hall administration building on the Shearer Quadrangle

The university was located on a 170-acre (0.69 km^{2}) campus with housing for approximately 1100 students. The campus occupied a rolling hilltop overlooking the Tygart Valley River and the community of Philippi, with its county courthouse, church spires and the historic Philippi Covered Bridge, used by both Confederate and Union troops during the first land battle of the Civil War. The Old Main building was built in 1909 but destroyed by fire in 1977. It was replaced by New Main, later renamed Burbick Hall, which was primarily used for administration.

The oldest extant building on the campus, Whitescarver Hall was built in 1911–1912 and named for George M. Whitescarver of Pruntytown, West Virginia. The Classical Revival building was designed by the architectural firm of Holmboe & Lafferty and was placed on the National Register of Historic Places in 1990. The local general hospital, Broaddus Hospital, was established on the Alderson-Broaddus campus in the 1950s, and operated from there until moving to a new location in the late 1990s.

At the time of closure, the campus included seven residence halls (Priestley Hall, Benedum Hall, Kincaid Hall, Battler Hall, and Blue, Gold and University Halls), Burbick Hall, the old Broaddus Hospital building, the Hamer student center and cafeteria, an arena for basketball, swimming, wrestling, and acrobatics and tumbling programs, tennis courts, a grass field used for intramural sports, a turf field stadium for football, lacrosse, and soccer teams, six academic buildings (including the Withers-Brandon complex for humanities and social sciences, the Kemper-Redd science building and Myers Hall for the health sciences), a building housing Pickett Library and Funkhouser Auditorium, and Wilcox Chapel.

== Athletics ==
Known as the Alderson Broaddus Battlers, harkening back to the Battle of Philippi (1861), the university was a member of NCAA Division II. Its athletic programs competed in the West Virginia Intercollegiate Athletic Conference from 1924 to 2013, the Great Midwest Athletic Conference from 2013 to 2020, and finally the Mountain East Conference until the school's closure in 2023.

The team's colors were navy blue, gray and gold, and its mascot was named Skirmish. At the time of its closure the university offered 20 sports, all at the varsity level: football, acrobatics, baseball, softball, men's and women's basketball, men's and women's soccer, men's and women's lacrosse, men's and women's volleyball, men's and women's cross country, men's and women's track & field, men's and women's wrestling, men's sprint football, and cheerleading.

== Notable people ==
=== Alumni ===
- Denise Campbell, politician
- Fred Chenoweth, college football coach
- Theodore S. Coberly, United States Air Force brigadier general
- Randy Dobnak, professional baseball player
- Josh Gabriel, Grenadian international footballer
- Barrington Gaynor, professional soccer coach
- Chris Grassie, college soccer coach
- Hunter Hardman, college football coach
- Ernie Nestor, college basketball coach
- Donovan Olumba, professional football player
- John O'Neal, politician
- Kirk Pearson, professional soccer player
- Enrico del Rosario, professional soccer player
- Ed Schrock, politician
- Gil Vainshtein, professional soccer player
- Jimmy Williams, professional basketball player
- Steve Willis, Baptist pastor and national health activist
- Richard F. Wilson, president of Illinois Wesleyan University
- Jessica L. Wright, first woman Adjutant General of the Pennsylvania National Guard

=== Faculty ===
- Bob Gray, former alumn and soccer coach
