= 1954 Dayton Flyers football team =

American college football season

1954 Dayton Flyers football
- Conference: Independent
- Record: 5–5
- Head coach: Hugh Devore (1st season)
- Home stadium: UD Stadium

1954 Midwestern college football independents records
| | Conf. | | | Overall |
| Team | W | L | T | W | | L | | T |
|---|---|---|---|---|---|---|---|---|
| Omaha | | – | | 10 | – | 0 | – | 0 |
| No. 4 Notre Dame | | – | | 9 | – | 1 | – | 0 |
| Wabash | | – | | 7 | – | 1 | – | 1 |
| Cincinnati | | – | | 8 | – | 2 | – | 0 |
| Youngstown | | – | | 7 | – | 2 | – | 0 |
| Washington University | | – | | 6 | – | 3 | – | 0 |
| Carthage | | – | | 5 | – | 3 | – | 0 |
| Dayton | | – | | 5 | – | 5 | – | 0 |
| Michigan Tech | | – | | 3 | – | 4 | – | 0 |
| Marquette | | – | | 3 | – | 5 | – | 1 |
| Wayne | | – | | 3 | – | 5 | – | 1 |
| John Carroll | | – | | 3 | – | 5 | – | 0 |
| Rose Poly | | – | | 2 | – | 5 | – | 0 |
| Drake | | – | | 2 | – | 7 | – | 0 |
| Xavier | | – | | 2 | – | 8 | – | 0 |
| Baldwin–Wallace | | – | | 1 | – | 8 | – | 0 |
Rankings from AP Poll

The 1954 Dayton Flyers football team represented the University of Dayton as an independent during the 1954 college football season. In their first season under head coach Hugh Devore, the Flyers compiled a 5–5 record. Dayton played their home games at UD Stadium in Dayton, Ohio.

== Schedule ==
| Date | Opponent | Site | Result | Attendance | Source |
|---|---|---|---|---|---|
| September 18 | Bowling Green | UD Stadium; Dayton, OH | L 0–18 | | |
| September 25 | at Cincinnati | Nippert Stadium; Cincinnati, OH | L 13–42 | 20,000 | |
| October 2 | John Carroll | UD Stadium; Dayton, OH | L 12–20 | 6,900 | |
| October 9 | Louisville | UD Stadium; Dayton, OH | W 27–7 | 7,223 | |
| October 17 | at Xavier | Xavier Stadium; Cincinnati, OH | W 21–20 | 7,500 | |
| October 23 | at Tennessee | Shields–Watkins Field; Knoxville, TN | L 7–14 | 21,000 | |
| November 6 | Mississippi Southern | UD Stadium; Dayton, OH | W 20–7 | 7,775 | |
| November 13 | at Miami (OH) | Miami Field; Oxford, OH | W 20–12 | | |
| November 20 | Xavier | UD Stadium; Dayton, OH | W 13–0 | | |
| November 25 | at Chattanooga | Chamberlain Field; Chattanooga, TN | L 14–25 | 7,000 | |
