= Marianna Coal Mine disaster =

Marianna Mine Disaster Event in Pennsylvania

Coordinates: 40.0169°N 80.0983°W

The Marianna Coal Mine disaster, in Marianna, Pennsylvania, killed 154 miners and left one survivor on November 28, 1908, in what was the worst disaster in Washington County history. The incident, and several others at the time, catalyzed public advocacy for mine safety, leading to the establishment of the US Bureau of Mines in 1910. USBM research on safer blasting material and the prevention of mine gas and dust explosions resulted in reduced occurrence of mine disasters.

A historical marker commemorating the disaster was erected in 2019 by the Pennsylvania Historical and Museum Commission in Marianna Borough.
