= 1954 Notre Dame Fighting Irish football team =

American college football season

1954 Notre Dame Fighting Irish football
- Conference: Independent

Ranking
- Coaches: No. 4
- AP: No. 4
- Record: 9–1
- Head coach: Terry Brennan (1st season)
- Captains: Paul Matz; Dan Shannon
- Home stadium: Notre Dame Stadium

1954 Midwestern college football independents records
	Conf.			Overall
Team	W	L	T	W		L		T
Omaha		–		10	–	0	–	0
No. 4 Notre Dame		–		9	–	1	–	0
Wabash		–		7	–	1	–	1
Cincinnati		–		8	–	2	–	0
Youngstown		–		7	–	2	–	0
Washington University		–		6	–	3	–	0
Carthage		–		5	–	3	–	0
Dayton		–		5	–	5	–	0
Michigan Tech		–		3	–	4	–	0
Marquette		–		3	–	5	–	1
Wayne		–		3	–	5	–	1
John Carroll		–		3	–	5	–	0
Rose Poly		–		2	–	5	–	0
Drake		–		2	–	7	–	0
Xavier		–		2	–	8	–	0
Baldwin–Wallace		–		1	–	8	–	0
Rankings from AP Poll

The 1954 Notre Dame Fighting Irish football team was an American football team that represented the University of Notre Dame as an independent during the 1954 college football season. In their first year under head coach Terry Brennan, the Fighting Irish compiled a 9–1 record, outscored opponents by a total of 261 to 115, and were ranked No. 4 in the final AP poll.

Quarterback Ralph Guglielmi played on offense and defense and was a consensus first-team pick on the 1954 All-America college football team. Tackle Frank Varrichione received firsst-team All-America honors from the Central Press and The Sporting News and second-team honors from the United Press and International News Service. Paul Matz and Dan Shannon were the team co-captains.

The team played its home games at Notre Dame Stadium in Notre Dame, Indiana.

== Schedule ==
Date	Opponent	Rank	Site	Result	Attendance	Source
September 25	No. 4 Texas	No. 2	Notre Dame Stadium; Notre Dame, IN	W 21–0	57,594	
October 2	No. 19 Purdue	No. 1	Notre Dame Stadium; Notre Dame, IN (rivalry)	L 14–27	58,250	
October 9	at Pittsburgh	No. 8	Pitt Stadium; Pittsburgh, PA (rivalry)	W 33–0	60,114	
October 16	Michigan State	No. 8	Notre Dame Stadium; Notre Dame, IN (rivalry)	W 20–19	57,238	
October 30	vs. No. 15 Navy	No. 6	Memorial Stadium; Baltimore, MD (rivalry)	W 6–0	60,000	
November 6	at Penn	No. 5	Franklin Field; Philadelphia, PA	W 42–7	61,189	
November 13	North Carolina	No. 5	Notre Dame Stadium; Notre Dame, IN (rivalry)	W 42–13	55,410	
November 20	at No. 19 Iowa	No. 4	Iowa Stadium; Iowa City, IA	W 34–18	56,576	
November 27	No. 17 USC	No. 4	Notre Dame Stadium; Notre Dame, IN (rivalry)	W 23–17	56,438	
December 4	at SMU	No. 4	Cotton Bowl; Dallas, TX	W 26–14	75,501	
Rankings from AP Poll released prior to the game

== Personnel ==
=== Players ===
- Pat Bisceglia, guard
- Walter Cabral, end
- Tom Carey, quarterback
- Wayne Edmonds, guard
- Richard Fitzgerald, fullback
- Don George, end
- Ralph Guglielmi, quarterback
- Joe Heap, halfback
- Paul Hornung, quarterback
- Richard Keller, halfback
- Jack Lee, guard
- Ray Lemek, guard
- Paul Matz, co-captain and end
- Jim Morse, halfback
- Sam Palumbo, tackle
- Robert Ready, tackle
- Paul Reynolds, fullback
- Don Schaefer, fullback-halfback
- Dan Shannon, co-captain and end
- Dean Studer, back
- Dick Szymanski, center
- Frank Varrichione, tackle
