= Marianna Historic District =

Marianna Historic District may refer to:

- Marianna Commercial Historic District, Marianna, Arkansas, listed on the National Register of Historic Places (NRHP) in Lee County, Arkansas
- Marianna Historic District (Marianna, Florida), NRHP-listed
- Marianna Historic District (Marianna, Pennsylvania), listed on the NRHP in Pennsylvania
