= Herbert L. Smith =

American football player and coach

Playing career
- 1927: Michigan State Normal

Coaching career (HC unless noted)
- 1929–1941: Cooley HS (MI)
- 1946–1947: Wayne (assistant)
- 1948: Wayne
- 1949–1954: Wayne (assistant)
- 1955–1959: Wayne / Wayne State

Head coaching record
- Overall: 19–21–3

Accomplishments and honors

Championships
- 1 PAC (1956)

Herbert L. Smith was an American college football player and coach. He served as the head football coach at Wayne State University in Detroit, Michigan in 1948 and from 1955 to 1959, compiling a record of 19–21–3.

== Biography ==
Smith played college football at Michigan State Normal College—now known as Eastern Michigan University. In 1929, he became the head coach at Detroit's Cooley High School. He served in the United States Navy during World War II. He joined the Wayne State coaching staff as an assistant in 1946. He was promoted to head coach in 1948, but only took the job on a one-year basis. He was replaced by Lou Zarza and remained on staff as an assistant. Zarza was fired after the 1954 season and Smith was once again elevated to head coach. He stopped coaching due to illness in 1960, but remained a member of Wayne State's faculty until his retirement in 1967. He died on February 25, 1981 in Houghton, Michigan.

== Head coaching record ==
=== College ===
Year	Team	Overall	Conference	Standing	Bowl/playoffs
Wayne Tartars (Independent) (1948)
1948	Wayne	4–4			
Wayne / Wayne State Tartars (Presidents' Athletic Conference) (1955–1959)
1955	Wayne	1–5–1	1–3–1	4th	
1956	Wayne State	4–2–1	3–0–1	1st	
1957	Wayne State	4–3	2–1	2nd	
1958	Wayne State	2–4–1	2–1–1	3rd	
1959	Wayne State	4–3	4–1	T–2nd	
Wayne:		19–21–3	12–6–3		
Total:		19–21–3			
National championship Conference title Conference division title or championship game berth
