= 1954 Western Reserve Red Cats football team =

American college football season

1954 Western Reserve Red Cats football
- Conference: Mid-American Conference
- Record: 3–4–1 (2–3 MAC)
- Head coach: Edward L. Finnigan (4th season)
- Captain: Gordon McCarter
- Home stadium: Clarke Field

1954 Mid-American Conference football standings
	Conf.					Overall
Team	W		L		T	W		L		T
Miami (OH) $	4	–	0	–	0	8	–	1	–	0
Kent State	4	–	1	–	0	8	–	2	–	0
Ohio	5	–	2	–	0	6	–	3	–	0
Toledo	3	–	2	–	0	6	–	2	–	1
Western Michigan	3	–	4	–	0	4	–	5	–	0
Western Reserve	2	–	3	–	0	3	–	4	–	1
Marshall	2	–	5	–	0	4	–	5	–	0
Bowling Green	0	–	6	–	0	2	–	7	–	0
$ – Conference champion

The 1954 Western Reserve Red Cats football team represented the Western Reserve University—now known as Case Western Reserve University—as a member of the Mid-American Conference (MAC) during the 1954 college football season. Led by fourth-year head coach Edward L. Finnigan, the Red Cats compiled an overall record of 3–4–1 with a mark of 2–3 in conference play, placing sixth in the MAC. Fullback Gordon McCarter was the team's captain.

== Schedule ==
Date	Time	Opponent	Site	Result	Source
September 25		at Toledo	Glass Bowl; Toledo, OH	W 13–7	
October 1		at Kent State	Memorial Stadium; Kent, OH	L 0–65	
October 9		Ohio	Clarke Field; Cleveland, OH	L 0–37	
October 16	3:00 p.m.	at Washington University*	Francis Field; St. Louis, MO	L 6–33	
October 23		Buffalo*	Clarke Field; Cleveland, OH	W 34–7	
October 30		Marshall	Clarke Field; Cleveland, OH	W 21–20	
November 13		at Western Michigan	Waldo Stadium; Kalamazoo, MI	L 0–38	
November 20		Butler*	Clarke Field; Cleveland, OH	T 13–13	
*Non-conference game; All times are in Eastern time
