= 1954 Eastern Kentucky Maroons football team =

American college football season

1954 Eastern Kentucky Maroons football

OVC champion

Tangerine Bowl, L 6–7 vs. Omaha
- Conference: Ohio Valley Conference
- Record: 8–1–1 (5–0 OVC)
- Head coach: Glenn Presnell (1st season)

1954 Ohio Valley Conference football standings
	Conf.					Overall
Team	W		L		T	W		L		T
Eastern Kentucky $	5	–	0	–	0	8	–	1	–	1
Western Kentucky	3	–	2	–	0	7	–	3	–	0
Murray State	3	–	2	–	0	5	–	4	–	0
Middle Tennessee	2	–	2	–	1	4	–	4	–	2
Tennessee Tech	1	–	3	–	1	4	–	4	–	2
Morehead State	0	–	5	–	0	0	–	9	–	0
$ – Conference champion

The 1954 Eastern Kentucky Maroons football team was an American football team that represented Eastern Kentucky State College—now known as Eastern Kentucky University–as a member of the Ohio Valley Conference (OVC) during the 1954 college football season. Led by first-year head coach Glenn Presnell, the Maroons compiled an overall record of 8–1–1 with a mark of 5–0 in conference play, winning the OVC title. Eastern Kentucky was invited to the Tangerine Bowl, where the Maroons lost to Omaha.

== Schedule ==
Date	Time	Opponent	Site	Result	Attendance	Source
September 18		John Carroll*	Richmond, KY	W 19–0		
September 24		at Middle Tennessee	Horace Jones Field; Murfreesboro, TN	W 26–0		
October 1		Murray State	Richmond, KY	W 25–6	2,500	
October 8		Tennessee Tech	Richmond, KY	W 14–7	3,000	
October 16		at Youngstown*	Youngstown, OH	W 25–7	11,500	
October 23		at Morehead State	Morehead, KY (Old Hawg Rifle)	W 12–8	4,500	
October 30		Toledo*	Richmond, KY	T 13–13		
November 6	3:00 p.m.	at Western Kentucky	Western Stadium; Bowling Green, KY (rivalry)	W 21–0	6,200	
November 13		Louisville*^{†}	Richmond, KY	W 20–6	6,000	
January 1		vs. Omaha*	Tangerine Bowl; Orlando, FL (Tangerine Bowl)	L 6–7	12,759	
*Non-conference game; ^{†}Homecoming; All times are in Eastern time
