= 1954 Kent State Golden Flashes football team =

American college football season

1954 Kent State Golden Flashes football

Refrigerator Bowl, L 7–19 vs. Delaware
- Conference: Mid-American Conference
- Record: 8–2 (4–1 MAC)
- Head coach: Trevor J. Rees (9th season)
- Home stadium: Memorial Stadium

1954 Mid-American Conference football standings
	Conf.					Overall
Team	W		L		T	W		L		T
Miami (OH) $	4	–	0	–	0	8	–	1	–	0
Kent State	4	–	1	–	0	8	–	2	–	0
Ohio	5	–	2	–	0	6	–	3	–	0
Toledo	3	–	2	–	0	6	–	2	–	1
Western Michigan	3	–	4	–	0	4	–	5	–	0
Western Reserve	2	–	3	–	0	3	–	4	–	1
Marshall	2	–	5	–	0	4	–	5	–	0
Bowling Green	0	–	6	–	0	2	–	7	–	0
$ – Conference champion

The 1954 Kent State Golden Flashes football team was an American football team that represented Kent State University in the Mid-American Conference (MAC) during the 1954 college football season. In their ninth season under head coach Trevor J. Rees, the Golden Flashes compiled an 8–2 record (4–1 against MAC opponents), finished in second place in the MAC, lost to Delaware in the Refrigerator Bowl, and outscored all opponents by a combined total of 331 to 130.

The team's statistical leaders included Lou Mariano with 1,037 rushing yards, Bob Stimac with 434 passing yards, and Bill Whitley with 239 receiving yards. Offensive tackle Joe Barbee was selected as a first-team All-MAC player.

== Schedule ==
Date	Opponent	Site	Result	Attendance	Source
September 18	Waynesburg*	Memorial Stadium; Kent, OH	W 26–0		
October 1	Western Reserve	Memorial Stadium; Kent, OH	W 65–0		
October 8	at Baldwin Wallace*	Berea, OH	W 52–7		
October 16	Ohio	Memorial Stadium; Kent, OH	L 7–14		
October 23	at Marshall	Fairfield Stadium; Huntington, WV	W 41–20		
October 30	Bowling Green	Memorial Stadium; Kent, OH (rivalry)	W 28–25		
November 6	at Akron*	Rubber Bowl; Akron, OH (Wagon Wheel)	W 58–18		
November 13	John Carroll*	Memorial Stadium; Kent, OH	W 27–14		
November 20	Western Michigan	Memorial Stadium; Kent, OH	W 20–13		
December 5	vs. Delaware*	Reitz Stadium; Evansville, IN (Refrigerator Bowl)	L 7–19	3,000	
*Non-conference game
