= 1954 Toledo Rockets football team =

American college football season

1954 Toledo Rockets football
- Conference: Mid-American Conference
- Record: 6–2–1 (3–2 MAC)
- Head coach: Forrest England (1st season)
- Home stadium: Glass Bowl

1954 Mid-American Conference football standings
	Conf.					Overall
Team	W		L		T	W		L		T
Miami (OH) $	4	–	0	–	0	8	–	1	–	0
Kent State	4	–	1	–	0	8	–	2	–	0
Ohio	5	–	2	–	0	6	–	3	–	0
Toledo	3	–	2	–	0	6	–	2	–	1
Western Michigan	3	–	4	–	0	4	–	5	–	0
Western Reserve	2	–	3	–	0	3	–	4	–	1
Marshall	2	–	5	–	0	4	–	5	–	0
Bowling Green	0	–	6	–	0	2	–	7	–	0
$ – Conference champion

The 1954 Toledo Rockets football team was an American football team that represented Toledo University in the Mid-American Conference (MAC) during the 1954 college football season. In their first season under head coach Forrest England, the Rockets compiled a 6–2–1 record (3–2 against MAC opponents), finished in fourth place in the MAC, and outscored their opponents by a combined total of 205 to 113.

The team's statistical leaders included Jerry Nowak with 393 passing yards, Mel Triplett with 803 rushing yards, and Dick Basich with 255 receiving yards.

== Schedule ==
Date	Opponent	Site	Result	Attendance	Source
September 18	Muskingum*	Glass Bowl; Toledo, OH	W 27–6		
September 25	Western Reserve	Glass Bowl; Toledo, OH	L 7–12		
October 2	at Ohio	Peden Stadium; Athens, OH	L 20–28		
October 9	John Carroll*	Glass Bowl; Toledo, OH	W 7–6		
October 16	at Western Michigan	Waldo Stadium; Kalamazoo, MI	W 19–7		
October 23	Bowling Green	Glass Bowl; Toledo, OH (rivalry)	W 38–7		
October 30	at Eastern Kentucky*	Richmond, KY	T 13–13		
November 6	Baldwin–Wallace*	Glass Bowl; Toledo, OH	W 47–13		
November 12	at Marshall	Fairfield Stadium; Huntington, WV	W 27–21		
*Non-conference game

== After the season ==
=== NFL draft ===
The following Rockets were selected in the 1955 NFL draft following the season.

Round	Pick	Player	Position	NFL club
5	56	Mel Triplett	Back	New York Giants
15	173	George Machoukas	Center	Green Bay Packers
