= 1954 Western Michigan Broncos football team =

American college football season

1954 Western Michigan Broncos football
- Conference: Mid-American Conference
- Record: 4–5 (3–4 MAC)
- Head coach: Jack Petoskey (2nd season)
- MVP: Jack Kelder
- Captain: Les Koster
- Home stadium: Waldo Stadium

1954 Mid-American Conference football standings
	Conf.					Overall
Team	W		L		T	W		L		T
Miami (OH) $	4	–	0	–	0	8	–	1	–	0
Kent State	4	–	1	–	0	8	–	2	–	0
Ohio	5	–	2	–	0	6	–	3	–	0
Toledo	3	–	2	–	0	6	–	2	–	1
Western Michigan	3	–	4	–	0	4	–	5	–	0
Western Reserve	2	–	3	–	0	3	–	4	–	1
Marshall	2	–	5	–	0	4	–	5	–	0
Bowling Green	0	–	6	–	0	2	–	7	–	0
$ – Conference champion

The 1954 Western Michigan Broncos football team represented Michigan College of Education (later renamed Western Michigan University) in the Mid-American Conference (MAC) during the 1954 college football season. In their second season under head coach Jack Petoskey, the Broncos compiled a 4–5 record (3–4 against MAC opponents), finished in fifth place in the MAC, and were outscored by their opponents, 186 to 136. The team played its home games at Waldo Stadium in Kalamazoo, Michigan.

Tackle Les Koster was the team captain. Offensive tackle Jack Kelder received the team's most outstanding player award.

== Schedule ==
Date	Time	Opponent	Site	Result	Attendance	Source
September 25		Central Michigan*	Waldo Stadium; Kalamazoo, MI (rivalry)	L 19–25		
October 2		at Marshall	Fairfield Stadium; Huntington, WV	L 13–47		
October 9		Bowling Green	Waldo Stadium; Kalamazoo, MI	W 20–15		
October 16		Toledo	Waldo Stadium; Kalamazoo, MI	L 7–19		
October 23	3:00 p.m.	at Washington University*	Francis Field; St. Louis, MO	W 7–6	8,000	
October 30		at Miami (OH)	Miami Field; Oxford, OH	L 0–48	9,900	
November 6		Ohio	Waldo Stadium; Kalamazoo, MI	W 19–6		
November 13		Western Reserve	Waldo Stadium; Kalamazoo, MI	W 38–0		
November 20		at Kent State	Memorial Stadium; Kent, OH	L 13–20	1,000	
*Non-conference game; All times are in Eastern time
