= 1954 Marquette Warriors football team =

American college football season

1954 Marquette Warriors football
- Conference: Independent
- Record: 3–5–1
- Head coach: Frosty Ferzacca (1st season)
- Home stadium: Marquette Stadium

1954 Midwestern college football independents records
	Conf.			Overall
Team	W	L	T	W		L		T
Omaha		–		10	–	0	–	0
No. 4 Notre Dame		–		9	–	1	–	0
Wabash		–		7	–	1	–	1
Cincinnati		–		8	–	2	–	0
Youngstown		–		7	–	2	–	0
Washington University		–		6	–	3	–	0
Carthage		–		5	–	3	–	0
Dayton		–		5	–	5	–	0
Michigan Tech		–		3	–	4	–	0
Marquette		–		3	–	5	–	1
Wayne		–		3	–	5	–	1
John Carroll		–		3	–	5	–	0
Rose Poly		–		2	–	5	–	0
Drake		–		2	–	7	–	0
Xavier		–		2	–	8	–	0
Baldwin–Wallace		–		1	–	8	–	0
Rankings from AP Poll

The 1954 Marquette Warriors football team represented Marquette University as an independent during the 1954 college football season. In its first season under head coach Frosty Ferzacca, the Warriors compiled a 3–5–1 record and were outscored 216 to 136. The team played home games at Marquette Stadium, sometimes referred to as Hilltop Stadium, west of campus, in Milwaukee.

Previously the head coach at Green Bay West High School for nine seasons, Ferzacca was hired in late January.

== Schedule ==
Date	Opponent	Site	Result	Attendance	Source
September 25	at No. 10 Wisconsin	Camp Randall Stadium; Madison, WI	L 14–52	52,819	
October 2	Miami (OH)	Marquette Stadium; Milwaukee, WI	L 26–27	15,000	
October 9	Cincinnati	Marquette Stadium; Milwaukee, WI	L 13–30	16,000	
October 16	at Holy Cross	Fitton Field; Worcester, MA	W 19–14	10,000	
October 23	Fordham^{†}	Marquette Stadium; Milwaukee, WI	T 14–14	19,500	
October 29	at Detroit	University of Detroit Stadium; Detroit, MI	W 14–13	8,275	
November 5	Boston College	Marquette Stadium; Milwaukee, WI	L 7–13	15,000	
November 13	at Pacific (CA)	Pacific Memorial Stadium; Stockton, CA	W 19–13	10,000	
November 20	at Michigan State	Macklin Stadium; East Lansing, MI	L 10–40	39,354	
^{†}Homecoming; Rankings from AP Poll released prior to the game
