= 1954 Drake Bulldogs football team =

American college football season

1954 Drake Bulldogs football
- Conference: Independent
- Record: 2–7
- Head coach: Warren Gaer (6th season)
- Home stadium: Drake Stadium

1954 Midwestern college football independents records
	Conf.			Overall
Team	W	L	T	W		L		T
Omaha		–		10	–	0	–	0
No. 4 Notre Dame		–		9	–	1	–	0
Wabash		–		7	–	1	–	1
Cincinnati		–		8	–	2	–	0
Youngstown		–		7	–	2	–	0
Washington University		–		6	–	3	–	0
Carthage		–		5	–	3	–	0
Dayton		–		5	–	5	–	0
Michigan Tech		–		3	–	4	–	0
Marquette		–		3	–	5	–	1
Wayne		–		3	–	5	–	1
John Carroll		–		3	–	5	–	0
Rose Poly		–		2	–	5	–	0
Drake		–		2	–	7	–	0
Xavier		–		2	–	8	–	0
Baldwin–Wallace		–		1	–	8	–	0
Rankings from AP Poll

The 1954 Drake Bulldogs football team was an American football team that represented Drake University as an independent during the 1954 college football season. Led by seventh-year head coach Warren Gaer, the Bulldogs compiled a record of 2–7.

== Schedule ==
Date	Time	Opponent	Site	Result	Attendance	Source
September 18		at Colorado	Folsom Field; Boulder, CO	L 0–61	14,500	
September 24	8:00 p.m.	Denver	Drake Stadium; Des Moines, IA	L 13–33	3,500	
October 1	8:00 p.m.	Wichita	Drake Stadium; Des Moines, IA	L 6–54	1,000	
October 9	8:00 p.m.	at Iowa State Teachers	O. R. Latham Stadium; Cedar Falls, IA	W 14–12	6,000	
October 16		at South Dakota	Inman Field; Vermillion, SD	W 26–33	3,500	
October 23	2:00 p.m.	Bradley^{†}	Drake Stadium; Des Moines, IA	L 7–14	5,000	
October 30	2:00 p.m.	at Iowa State	Clyde Williams Field; Ames, IA	L 0–35	7,642–8,000	
November 5	8:00 p.m.	Kansas State	Drake Stadium; Des Moines, IA	L 18–53	2,500	
November 12	1:00 p.m.	at Wayne	Tartar Field; Detroit, MI	W 33–24	580	
^{†}Homecoming; All times are in Central time
