= 1955 Tangerine Bowl =

American college football game

Eastern Kentucky Maroons	Omaha Indians
(8–0–1)	(9–0)
Ohio Valley Conference	Independent
6	7
Head coach: Glenn Presnell	Head coach: Lloyd Cardwell
	1	2	3	4	Total
Eastern Kentucky	0	6	0	0	6
Omaha	7	0	0	0	7
- Date: January 1, 1955
- Season: 1954
- Stadium: Tangerine Bowl
- Location: Orlando, Florida
- MVP: Bill Englehardt
- Attendance: 12,759

The 1955 Tangerine Bowl was an American college football bowl game played after the 1954 season, on January 1, 1955, at the Tangerine Bowl stadium in Orlando, Florida. The Omaha Indians (today's Omaha Mavericks, who no longer have a football team) defeated the Eastern Kentucky Maroons (now the Eastern Kentucky Colonels) by a score of 7–6.

== Game summary ==
Omaha scored on a 30-yard pass play in the first quarter, with Bill Englehardt both throwing the touchdown pass and then kicking the extra point. Eastern Kentucky answered with a touchdown in the second quarter, but the extra point was missed, leaving the score 7–6 at halftime. After a scoreless second half, the missed extra point proved to be the difference in the game. Englehardt was named the game's MVP.

== Scoring summary ==
Scoring summary

Quarter	Time	Drive			Team	Scoring information	Score	
Quarter	Time	Plays	Yards	TOP	Team	Scoring information	EKSC	Omaha
1	5:23	6	45		Omaha	Rudy Rotella 30-yard touchdown reception from Bill Englehardt, Bill Englehardt kick good	0	7
2	3:19	12	48		EKSC	Paul Greene 10-yard touchdown reception from Bobby Lenderman, Ernie Rigrish kick wide right	6	7
"TOP" = time of possession. For other American football terms, see Glossary of American football.							6	7

== Statistics ==
Program cover for 1955 game

Statistics	EKSC	Omaha
First downs	12	12
Rushing yards	133	103
Passes attempted	19	23
Passes completed	7	7
Passes intercepted by	1	0
Passing yards	65	105
Yards penalized	45	30
Punts–average	5–30	5–29.2
Fumbles lost	3	1
