= Don George (Canadian football) =

American gridiron football player (1934–2014)

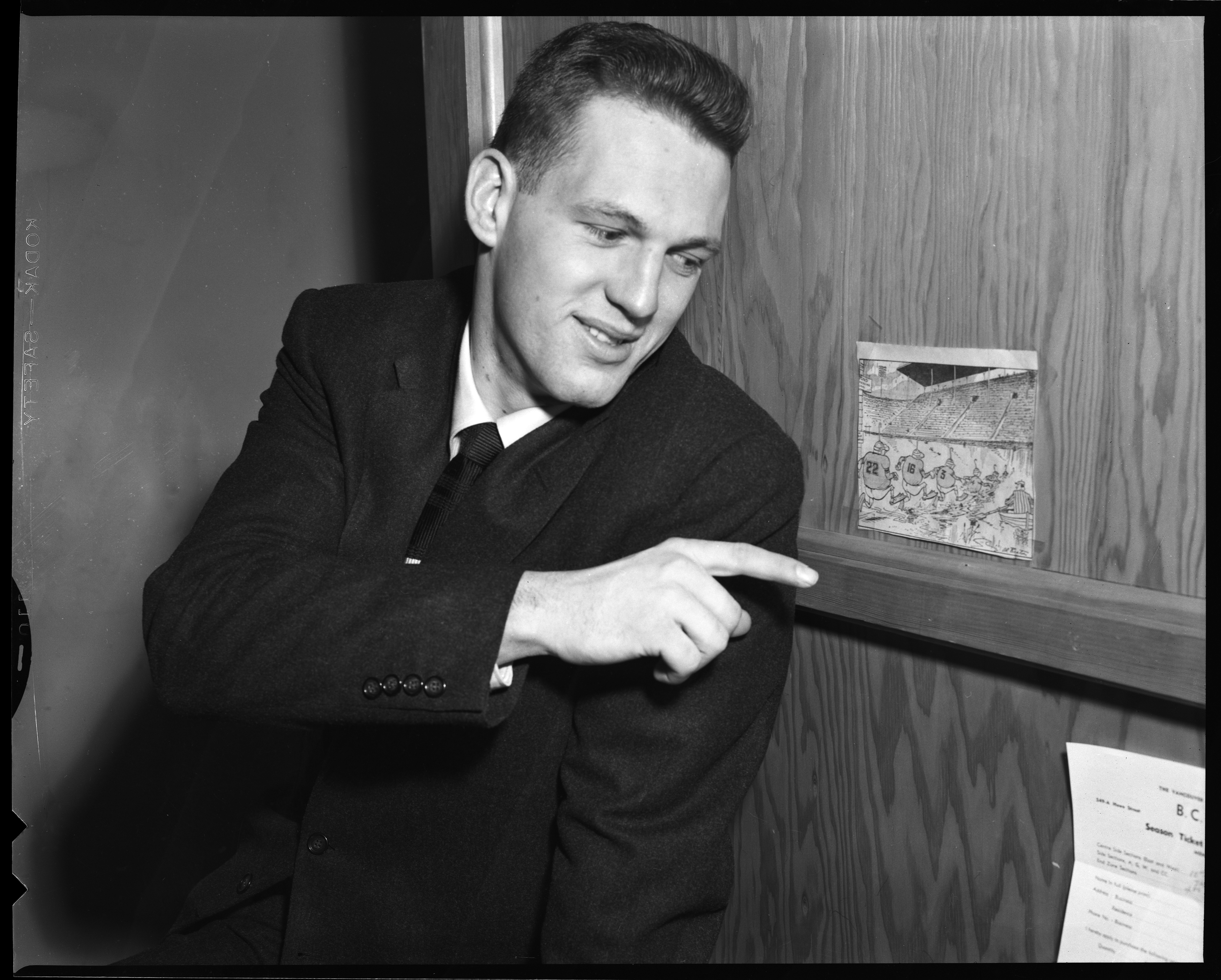
- Don George in 1955

Profile
- Positions: Tackle, Linebacker

Personal information
- Born: April 8, 1934; Marianna, Pennsylvania, U.S.
- Died: August 1, 2014 (aged 80); Greensburg, Pennsylvania, U.S.
- Listed height: 6 ft 3 in (1.91 m)
- Listed weight: 218 lb (99 kg)

Career information
- High school: Dunbar Township (PA)
- College: Notre Dame

Career history
- 1955–1956: BC Lions

Donald H. George (April 8, 1934 – August 1, 2014) was an American professional football player who played for the BC Lions. He played college football at the University of Notre Dame.
