= 1954 Marshall Thundering Herd football team =

American college football season

1954 Marshall Thundering Herd football
- Conference: Mid-American Conference
- Record: 4–5 (2–5 MAC)
- Head coach: Herb Royer (2nd season)
- Captains: Henry Hinte; Albie Maier
- Home stadium: Fairfield Stadium

1954 Mid-American Conference football standings
	Conf.					Overall
Team	W		L		T	W		L		T
Miami (OH) $	4	–	0	–	0	8	–	1	–	0
Kent State	4	–	1	–	0	8	–	2	–	0
Ohio	5	–	2	–	0	6	–	3	–	0
Toledo	3	–	2	–	0	6	–	2	–	1
Western Michigan	3	–	4	–	0	4	–	5	–	0
Western Reserve	2	–	3	–	0	3	–	4	–	1
Marshall	2	–	5	–	0	4	–	5	–	0
Bowling Green	0	–	6	–	0	2	–	7	–	0
$ – Conference champion

The 1954 Marshall Thundering Herd football team was an American football team that represented Marshall University in the Mid-American Conference (MAC) during the 1954 college football season. In its second season under head coach Herb Royer, the team compiled a 4–5 record (2–5 against conference opponents) and was outscored by a total of 214 to 203. Henry Hinte and Albie Maier were the team captains. The team played its home games at Fairfield Stadium in Huntington, West Virginia.

== Schedule ==
Date	Opponent	Site	Result	Attendance	Source
September 25	Morehead State*	Fairfield Stadium; Huntington, WV	W 19–7		
October 2	Western Michigan	Fairfield Stadium; Huntington, WV	W 47–13		
October 9	Morris Harvey*	Fairfield Stadium; Huntington, WV	W 25–14		
October 16	at Miami (OH)	Miami Field; Oxford, OH	L 0–46	8,000	
October 23	Kent State^{†}	Fairfield Stadium; Huntington, WV	L 20–41		
October 30	at Western Reserve	Clarke Field; Cleveland, OH	L 20–21		
November 6	at Bowling Green	University Stadium; Bowling Green, OH	W 26–19		
November 12	Toledo	Fairfield Stadium; Huntington, WV	L 21–27		
November 20	at Ohio	Peden Stadium; Athens, OH	L 25–26		
*Non-conference game; ^{†}Homecoming
