= 1954 Miami Redskins football team =

American college football season

1954 Miami Redskins football

MAC champion
- Conference: Mid-American Conference
- Record: 8–1 (4–0 MAC)
- Head coach: Ara Parseghian (4th season)
- Captain: Bob Bronston
- Home stadium: Miami Field

1954 Mid-American Conference football standings
	Conf.					Overall
Team	W		L		T	W		L		T
Miami (OH) $	4	–	0	–	0	8	–	1	–	0
Kent State	4	–	1	–	0	8	–	2	–	0
Ohio	5	–	2	–	0	6	–	3	–	0
Toledo	3	–	2	–	0	6	–	2	–	1
Western Michigan	3	–	4	–	0	4	–	5	–	0
Western Reserve	2	–	3	–	0	3	–	4	–	1
Marshall	2	–	5	–	0	4	–	5	–	0
Bowling Green	0	–	6	–	0	2	–	7	–	0
$ – Conference champion

The 1954 Miami Redskins football team was an American football team that represented Miami University in the Mid-American Conference (MAC) during the 1954 college football season. In its fourth season under head coach Ara Parseghian, Miami compiled an 8–1 record (4–0 against MAC opponents), won the MAC championship, held five of nine opponents to seven points or less, shut out three opponents, and outscored all opponents by a combined total of 294 to 82.

Bob Bronston was the team captain. The team's statistical leaders included Bob Wallace with 411 rushing yards, Dick Hunter with 529 passing yards, and Bill Mallory with 197 receiving yards.

== Schedule ==
Date	Opponent	Site	Result	Attendance	Source
September 25	at Bowling Green	Bowling Green, OH	W 46–7	4,976	
October 2	at Marquette*	Marquette Stadium; Milwaukee, WI	W 27–26	15,000	
October 9	Xavier*	Miami Field; Oxford, OH	W 42–7	9,136	
October 16	Marshall	Miami Field; Oxford, OH	W 46–0	8,000	
October 23	at Ohio	Peden Stadium; Athens, OH (rivalry)	W 46–13	12,818	
October 31	Western Michigan	Miami Field; Oxford, OH	W 48–0		
November 6	at Indiana*	Memorial Stadium; Bloomington, IN	W 6–0	24,563	
November 13	Dayton*	Miami Field; Oxford, OH	L 12–20		
November 25	at Cincinnati*	Nippert Stadium; Cincinnati, OH (Victory Bell)	W 21–9	30,000	
*Non-conference game
