= 1954 Xavier Musketeers football team =

American college football season

1954 Xavier Musketeers football
- Conference: Independent
- Record: 2–8
- Head coach: Ed Kluska (8th season)
- Home stadium: Xavier Stadium

1954 Midwestern college football independents records
	Conf.			Overall
Team	W	L	T	W		L		T
Omaha		–		10	–	0	–	0
No. 4 Notre Dame		–		9	–	1	–	0
Wabash		–		7	–	1	–	1
Cincinnati		–		8	–	2	–	0
Youngstown		–		7	–	2	–	0
Washington University		–		6	–	3	–	0
Carthage		–		5	–	3	–	0
Dayton		–		5	–	5	–	0
Michigan Tech		–		3	–	4	–	0
Marquette		–		3	–	5	–	1
Wayne		–		3	–	5	–	1
John Carroll		–		3	–	5	–	0
Rose Poly		–		2	–	5	–	0
Drake		–		2	–	7	–	0
Xavier		–		2	–	8	–	0
Baldwin–Wallace		–		1	–	8	–	0
Rankings from AP Poll

The 1954 Xavier Musketeers football team was an American football team that represented Xavier University as an independent during the 1954 college football season. In their eighth year under head coach Ed Kluska, the Musketeers compiled a 2–8 record.

== Schedule ==
Date	Opponent	Site	Result	Attendance	Source
September 19	Quantico Marines	Xavier Stadium; Cincinnati, OH	L 0–27	10,500	
September 25	at Ohio	Peden Stadium; Athens, OH	L 0–12		
October 3	Great Lakes Navy	Xavier Stadium; Cincinnati, OH	L 14–25	10,000	
October 9	at Miami (OH)	Miami Field; Oxford, OH	L 7–42	9,136	
October 17	Dayton	Xavier Stadium; Cincinnati, OH	L 20–21	7,500	
October 23	at Cincinnati	Nippert Stadium; Cincinnati, OH (rivalry)	L 0–33	27,000–29,000	
October 30	at Boston College	Fenway Park; Boston, MA	W 19–14	4,972	
November 6	at John Carroll	Shaw Stadium; East Cleveland, OH	W 26–7	4,000	
November 13	Chattanooga	Xavier Stadium; Cincinnati, OH	L 14–21	9,400	
November 20	at Dayton	UD Stadium; Dayton, OH	L 0–13		
