= 1954 Western Kentucky Hilltoppers football team =

American college football season

1954 Western Kentucky Hilltoppers football
- Conference: Ohio Valley Conference
- Record: 7–3 (3–2 OVC)
- Head coach: Jack Clayton (7th season)
- Captains: Jerry Passafiume; Jim Phifer

1954 Ohio Valley Conference football standings
	Conf.					Overall
Team	W		L		T	W		L		T
Eastern Kentucky $	5	–	0	–	0	8	–	1	–	1
Western Kentucky	3	–	2	–	0	7	–	3	–	0
Murray State	3	–	2	–	0	5	–	4	–	0
Middle Tennessee	2	–	2	–	1	4	–	4	–	2
Tennessee Tech	1	–	3	–	1	4	–	4	–	2
Morehead State	0	–	5	–	0	0	–	9	–	0
$ – Conference champion

The 1954 Western Kentucky Hilltoppers football team represented Western Kentucky State College (now known as Western Kentucky University) as a member of the Ohio Valley Conference (OVC) during the 1954 college football season. Led by seventh-year head coach Jack Clayton, the Hilltoppers compiled an overall record of 6–4 with a mark of 2–3 in conference play, tying for second place in the OVC. The team's captains were Jerry Passafiume and Jim Phifer.

== Schedule ==
Date	Time	Opponent	Site	Result	Attendance	Source
September 18		Wittenberg*	Bowling Green, KY	W 32–13		
September 25		at East Tennessee State*	Johnson City, TN	W 24–6		
October 2		Middle Tennessee	Bowling Green, KY (rivalry)	W 7–6		
October 9		at Morehead State	Morehead, KY	W 19–13		
October 16		Northeast Louisiana State*	Bowling Green, KY	W 19–7		
October 23		at Tennessee Tech	Cookeville, TN	W 32–12		
October 30		Louisville*	Bowling Green, KY	W 25–7		
November 6	2:00 p.m.	Eastern Kentucky^{†}	Western Stadium; Bowling Green, KY (rivalry)	L 0–21	6,200	
November 13		at Evansville*	Evansville, IN	L 13–21		
November 20		at Murray State	Cutchin Stadium; Murray, KY (rivalry)	L 0–19		
*Non-conference game; ^{†}Homecoming; All times are in Central time
