= Frosty Ferzacca =

American football coach and administrator (1908–2004)

Biographical details
- Born: January 29, 1908; Iron Mountain, Michigan, U.S.
- Died: August 13, 2004 (aged 96); Green Bay, Wisconsin, U.S.

Playing career

Football
- 1927–1930: Lake Forest

Basketball
- 1929–1931: Lake Forest

Baseball
- c. 1930: Lake Forest
- 1933: Superior Blues
- 1940: Green Bay Bluejays
- Position: Quarterback (football)

Coaching career (HC unless noted)

Football
- 1937–1944: Green Bay West HS (WI) (assistant)
- 1945–1953: Green Bay West HS (WI)
- 1954–1955: Marquette
- 1957–1965: Northern Michigan

Basketball
- 1937–1945: Green Bay West HS (WI)

Administrative career (AD unless noted)
- 1956–1957: Green Bay Packers (dir. ticket sales)
- 1957–1966: Northern Michigan
- 1966–1973: Eastern Michigan
- 1974–1975: FIU
- 1982–1988: Mid-Continent Conference (commissioner)

Head coaching record
- Overall: 58–36–4 (college football)
- Tournaments: 0–0–1 (NAIA playoffs)

Accomplishments and honors

Awards
- Wisconsin Football Coaches Association (WFCA) Hall of Fame (inducted in 1981)

Faust Louis "Frosty" Ferzacca (January 29, 1908 – August 13, 2004) was an American football coach and college athletics administrator. He served as the head football coach at Marquette University from 1954 to 1955 and at Northern Michigan University from 1957 to 1965, compiling a career college football record of 58–36–4. He was also the athletic director at Northern Michigan from 1957 to 1966, Eastern Michigan University from 1966 to 1973, and Florida International University (FIU) from 1974 to 1975 before serving as the commissioner of the Mid-Continent Conference—now known as the Summit League—from 1982 to 1988.

== Early life and playing career ==
Ferazza was a native of Iron Mountain, Michigan and attended Iron Mountain High School. He moved on to Lake Forest College in 1927, where he lettered in football, basketball, and baseball and competed in track and field. Ferazza played minor league baseball for the Superior Blues of the Northern League in 1933.

== Coaching career ==
Ferzacca starting his coaching career at Iron Mountain High School. He also coached in Montreal, Wisconsin before moving to Green Bay West High School in 1937 as an assistant football coach and head basketball coach. In 1945, Ferzacca became head football coach at Green Bay West when illness forced his predecessor, Lars Thune, to retire. At this point, Ferzacca gave up his responsibilities as basketball coach but also served at the school's athletic director and track coach. Ferzacca remained as the head football coach at Green Bay West for nine seasons, through 1953, leading his team to five Fox River Valley championships and an overall record of 62–16–3.

In January 1954, Ferzacca was named the head football coach at Marquette University, succeeding Lisle Blackbourn, who had taken the head coaching job with the Green Bay Packers of the National Football League (NFL). Ferzacca signed a three-year contract with Marquette that paid him an annual salary of $10,000. In 1950, Ferzacca had been offered a position as backfield coach at Marquette under Blackbourn, but remained at Green Bay West when he signed a new contract with the high school that reportedly gave him "substantial benefits".

== Death ==
Ferzacca died on August 13, 2004, at a nursing home in Green Bay, Wisconsin.

== Head coaching record ==
=== College football ===
| Year | Team | Overall | Conference | Standing | Bowl/playoffs |
|---|---|---|---|---|---|
Marquette Warriors (Independent) (1954–1955)
| 1954 | Marquette | 3–5–1 | | | |
| 1955 | Marquette | 2–6–1 | | | |
| Marquette: | | 5–11–2 | | | |
Northern Michigan Wildcats (NCAA College Division independent) (1957–1965)
| 1957 | Northern Michigan | 6–2 | | | |
| 1958 | Northern Michigan | 5–5 | | | |
| 1959 | Northern Michigan | 6–2 | | | |
| 1960 | Northern Michigan | 8–1–1 | | | T NAIA Semifinal |
| 1961 | Northern Michigan | 6–2 | | | |
| 1962 | Northern Michigan | 6–3 | | | |
| 1963 | Northern Michigan | 4–4–1 | | | |
| 1964 | Northern Michigan | 5–3 | | | |
| 1965 | Northern Michigan | 7–3 | | | |
| Northern Michigan: | | 53–25–2 | | | |
| Total: | | 58–36–4 | | | |
