= 1954 Cincinnati Bearcats football team =

American college football season

1954 Cincinnati Bearcats football
- Conference: Independent
- Record: 8–2
- Head coach: Sid Gillman (6th season)
- Captain: Dick Goist
- Home stadium: Nippert Stadium

1954 Midwestern college football independents records
	Conf.			Overall
Team	W	L	T	W		L		T
Omaha		–		10	–	0	–	0
No. 4 Notre Dame		–		9	–	1	–	0
Wabash		–		7	–	1	–	1
Cincinnati		–		8	–	2	–	0
Youngstown		–		7	–	2	–	0
Washington University		–		6	–	3	–	0
Carthage		–		5	–	3	–	0
Dayton		–		5	–	5	–	0
Michigan Tech		–		3	–	4	–	0
Marquette		–		3	–	5	–	1
Wayne		–		3	–	5	–	1
John Carroll		–		3	–	5	–	0
Rose Poly		–		2	–	5	–	0
Drake		–		2	–	7	–	0
Xavier		–		2	–	8	–	0
Baldwin–Wallace		–		1	–	8	–	0
Rankings from AP Poll

The 1954 Cincinnati Bearcats football team was an American football team that represented the University of Cincinnati as an independent during the 1954 college football season. In their sixth and final season under head coach Sid Gillman, the Bearcats compiled an 8–2 record and outscored opponents by a total of 249 to 107.

The 1953 team ended its season on a winning streak, and the 1954 team extended the streak to 16 games. The team reached No. 12 in the AP Poll before losing to Wichita on November 14, 1954.

Fullback Joe Miller led the team with 717 rushing yards (an average of 7.54 yards per carry) and 66 points scored on 11 rushing touchdowns. The team's other statistical leaders included Mike Murphy with 764 passing yards and Ferd Maccioli with 179 receiving yards.

In January 1955, Gillman resigned as Cincinnati's head coach to become the head coach of the Los Angeles Rams. In six years at Cincinnati, Gillman compiled a 50–13–1 record.

== Schedule ==
Date	Opponent	Rank	Site	Result	Attendance	Source
September 18	at Detroit		University of Detroit Stadium; Detroit, MI	W 21–13	17,150	
September 25	Dayton		Nippert Stadium; Cincinnati, OH	W 42–13	20,000	
October 2	Tulsa		Nippert Stadium; Cincinnati, OH	W 40–7	18,000	
October 9	at Marquette		Marquette Stadium; Milwaukee, WI	W 30–13	16,000	
October 16	Hardin–Simmons		Nippert Stadium; Cincinnati, OH	W 27–13	16,000	
October 23	Xavier		Nippert Stadium; Cincinnati, OH (rivalry)	W 33–0	27,000–29,000	
October 30	Pacific (CA)	No. 20	Nippert Stadium; Cincinnati, OH	W 13–7	18,000	
November 6	at Arizona State	No. 13	Goodwin Stadium; Tempe, AZ	W 34–7	13,000	
November 13	Wichita	No. 12	Nippert Stadium; Cincinnati, OH	L 0–13	20,000	
November 25	Miami (OH)		Nippert Stadium; Cincinnati, OH (rivalry)	L 9–21	30,000	
Rankings from AP Poll released prior to the game

== Players ==
The team's starters included:

- Jack Campbell, guard, No. 58, 195 pounds
- Glenn Dillhoff, end, No. 56, 190 pounds
- Dave Faulkner, center, No. 67, 196 pounds
- Dick Goist, left halfback and captain
- Noel Guyot, tackle, No. 85, 208 pounds
- Ferd Maccioli, end, No. 88, 200 pounds
- Gene McCann, guard, No. 19, 188 pounds
- Marv Merritt, tackle, No. 68, 205 pounds
- Joe Miller, fullback, No. 39, 188 pounds
- Mike Murphy, quarterback, No. 77, 170 pounds
- Dick Pardini, halfback, No. 21, 175 pounds
