= 1954 Middle Tennessee Blue Raiders football team =

American college football season

1954 Middle Tennessee Blue Raiders football
- Conference: Ohio Valley Conference
- Record: 4–4–2 (2–2–1 OVC)
- Head coach: Charles M. Murphy (8th season)
- Captains: Joe Collier; Garner Eze
- Home stadium: Horace Jones Field

1954 Ohio Valley Conference football standings
	Conf.					Overall
Team	W		L		T	W		L		T
Eastern Kentucky $	5	–	0	–	0	8	–	1	–	1
Western Kentucky	3	–	2	–	0	7	–	3	–	0
Murray State	3	–	2	–	0	5	–	4	–	0
Middle Tennessee	2	–	2	–	1	4	–	4	–	2
Tennessee Tech	1	–	3	–	1	4	–	4	–	2
Morehead State	0	–	5	–	0	0	–	9	–	0
$ – Conference champion

The 1954 Middle Tennessee Blue Raiders football team represented the Middle Tennessee State College—now known as Middle Tennessee State University—as a member of the Ohio Valley Conference (OVC) during the 1954 college football season. Led by eighth-year head coach Charles M. Murphy, the Blue Raiders compiled a record an overall record of 4–4–2 with a mark of 2–2–1 in conference play, placing fourth in the OVC. The team's captains were Joe Collier and Garner Eze.

== Schedule ==
Date	Opponent	Site	Result	Source
September 18	Sewart Air Force Base*	Horace Jones Field; Murfreesboro, TN	W 52–0	
September 24	Eastern Kentucky	Horace Jones Field; Murfreesboro, TN	L 0–26	
October 2	at Western Kentucky	Bowling Green, KY (rivalry)	L 6–7	
October 8	Austin Peay*	Horace Jones Field; Murfreesboro, TN	T 7–7	
October 16	Morehead State	Horace Jones Field; Murfreesboro, TN	W 20–13	
October 23	at Memphis State*	Crump Stadium; Memphis, TN	L 7–27	
October 30	Florence State*	Horace Jones Field; Murfreesboro, TN	W 27–26	
November 6	Murray State	Horace Jones Field; Murfreesboro, TN	W 21–13	
November 13	at East Tennessee State*	State College Stadium; Johnson City, TN	L 6–30	
November 25	at Tennessee Tech	Overhill Field; Cookeville, TN	T 7–7	
*Non-conference game
