= 1955 Western Reserve Red Cats football team =

American college football season

1955 Western Reserve Red Cats football

PAC champion
- Conference: Presidents' Athletic Conference
- Record: 5–1–1 (3–0 PAC)
- Head coach: Edward L. Finnigan (5th season)
- Home stadium: Clarke Field

1955 Presidents' Athletic Conference football standings
	Conf.					Overall
Team	W		L		T	W		L		T
Western Reserve $	3	–	0	–	0	5	–	1	–	1
John Carroll	2	–	2	–	1	3	–	3	–	1
Case Tech	2	–	3	–	0	3	–	3	–	0
Wayne	1	–	3	–	1	1	–	5	–	1
$ – Conference champion

The 1955 Western Reserve Red Cats football team represented Western Reserve University—now known as Case Western Reserve University— as a member of the Presidents' Athletic Conference (PAC) during the 1955 college football season. It was the inaugural season for the conference. In their fifth season under head coach Edward L. Finnigan, the Red Cats compiled an overall record of 5–1–1 with a mark of 3–0 in conference play, winning the PAC title. The team was led by senior quarterback Flory Mauriocourt and fullback Hal "Candy" Carroll.

== Schedule ==
Date	Opponent	Site	Result	Attendance	Source
October 8	Mount Union*	Clarke Field; Cleveland, OH	T 6–6		
October 15	Washington University*	Clarke Field; Cleveland, OH	W 9–6	1,200	
October 22	at Buffalo*	Rotary Field; Buffalo, NY	W 32–13		
October 29	at Wayne	Tartar Field; Detroit, MI	W 7–6		
November 5	John Carroll	Clarke Field; Cleveland, OH	W 19–7		
November 12	Western Michigan*	Clarke Field; Cleveland, OH	L 0–13		
November 19	at Case Tech	Clarke Field; Cleveland, OH	W 26–0		
*Non-conference game
