= Gordon McCarter =

American football official (1931–2002)

Gordon McCarter (May 26, 1931 − December 20, 2002) was an American football official in the National Football League (NFL) from 1967 to 1995. He joined the NFL as a line judge and back judge (now known as the field judge) in 1967 before being promoted to referee with the start of the 1974 NFL season when Jack Reader was named Assistant Supervisor of Officials at NFL headquarters in New York City. McCarter is most likely remembered for a 1995 game in which Pittsburgh Steelers head coach Bill Cowher stuffed a Polaroid photo in McCarter's uniform pocket while leaving the field. McCarter wore the uniform number 48 for the majority of his career.

McCarter was a 1954 graduate of Western Reserve University in Cleveland, Ohio, now known as Case Western Reserve University, and was the star fullback and team captain on the school's football team in 1954 and also worked for the university from 1963 to 1977 as director of alumni affairs and registrar.

After officiating at school football games and amateur track meets, McCarter joined the NFL in 1967 and later was in charge of several disputed games during his last years in the league. McCarter retired from the NFL following the 1995 NFL season.

McCarter died on December 20, 2002, in Cleveland at the age of 71.

== Bill Cowher incident ==
McCarter was the referee in a regular season game between the Minnesota Vikings and Pittsburgh Steelers on September 24, 1995, at Three Rivers Stadium in Pittsburgh.

Just before halftime, during a Minnesota field goal attempt, line judge Ben Montgomery called a penalty on Pittsburgh for having 12 players on the field; Minnesota received a five-yard penalty for this violation, and was able to score a field goal as a result.

Pittsburgh head coach Bill Cowher counted 11 players on the field, and in disgust, printed a photo to prove that there had been 11 players were on the field. At halftime, Cowher ran by McCarter as they were going to the locker room, and shoved a photo in McCarter's shirt pocket to show the referee the evidence. League rules did not allow using photographic evidence to overturn calls at the time, but the NFL later agreed that the officials miscounted the number of Pittsburgh players on the field.

Subsequently, the league issued McCarter and Montgomery a one-game check fine, or $4,009 for McCarter and $2,826 for Montgomery; according to The Wall Street Journal, these were the largest fines ever for an American sports official at the time. Cowher also was fined $7,500 for his conduct during the incident.

== Other notable games ==
McCarter was the referee for the 1985 Monday Night Football game between the Chicago Bears and Miami Dolphins at the Orange Bowl in Miami. The Bears came into the week 13 game undefeated, but were beaten by the Dolphins for their only loss of the season en route to their victory in Super Bowl XX.

McCarter was also the referee for a December 1990 Broncos/Chiefs game at Arrowhead Stadium where he asked the KC defense to help lower the crowd noise, saying that failure to do so would result in Kansas City being charged a timeout.
