= 1954 Ohio Bobcats football team =

American college football season

1954 Ohio Bobcats football
- Conference: Mid-American Conference
- Record: 6–3 (5–2 MAC)
- Head coach: Carroll Widdoes (7th season)
- Home stadium: Peden Stadium

1954 Mid-American Conference football standings
	Conf.					Overall
Team	W		L		T	W		L		T
Miami (OH) $	4	–	0	–	0	8	–	1	–	0
Kent State	4	–	1	–	0	8	–	2	–	0
Ohio	5	–	2	–	0	6	–	3	–	0
Toledo	3	–	2	–	0	6	–	2	–	1
Western Michigan	3	–	4	–	0	4	–	5	–	0
Western Reserve	2	–	3	–	0	3	–	4	–	1
Marshall	2	–	5	–	0	4	–	5	–	0
Bowling Green	0	–	6	–	0	2	–	7	–	0
$ – Conference champion

The 1954 Ohio Bobcats football team was an American football team that represented Ohio University in the Mid-American Conference (MAC) during the 1954 college football season. In their seventh season under head coach Carroll Widdoes, the Bobcats compiled a 6–3 record (5–2 against MAC opponents), finished in third place in the MAC, and outscored all opponents by a combined total of 175 to 158. They played their home games in Peden Stadium in Athens, Ohio.

== Schedule ==
Date	Opponent	Site	Result	Attendance	Source
September 25	Xavier*	Peden Stadium; Athens, OH	W 12–0		
October 2	Toledo	Peden Stadium; Athens, OH	W 28–20		
October 9	at Western Reserve	Clarke Field; Cleveland, OH	W 37–0		
October 16	at Kent State	Memorial Stadium; Kent, OH	W 14–7		
October 23	Miami (OH)	Peden Stadium; Athens, OH (rivalry)	L 13–46	12,818	
October 30	at Harvard*	Harvard Stadium; Boston, MA	L 13–27	6,500	
November 6	at Western Michigan	Waldo Stadium; Kalamazoo, MI	L 6–19		
November 13	at Bowling Green	University Stadium; Bowling Green, OH	W 26–14		
November 20	Marshall	Peden Stadium; Athens, OH (rivalry)	W 26–25		
*Non-conference game
