= 1954 Bowling Green Falcons football team =

American college football season

1954 Bowling Green Falcons football
- Conference: Mid-American Conference
- Record: 2–7 (0–6 MAC)
- Head coach: Robert Whittaker (14th season)
- MVP: Bill Bradshaw
- Captain: John Ladd
- Home stadium: University Stadium

1954 Mid-American Conference football standings
	Conf.					Overall
Team	W		L		T	W		L		T
Miami (OH) $	4	–	0	–	0	8	–	1	–	0
Kent State	4	–	1	–	0	8	–	2	–	0
Ohio	5	–	2	–	0	6	–	3	–	0
Toledo	3	–	2	–	0	6	–	2	–	1
Western Michigan	3	–	4	–	0	4	–	5	–	0
Western Reserve	2	–	3	–	0	3	–	4	–	1
Marshall	2	–	5	–	0	4	–	5	–	0
Bowling Green	0	–	6	–	0	2	–	7	–	0
$ – Conference champion

The 1954 Bowling Green Falcons football team was an American football team that represented Bowling Green State University in the Mid-American Conference (MAC) during the 1954 college football season. In their 14th and final season under head coach Robert Whittaker, the Falcons compiled a 2–7 record (0–6 against MAC opponents), finished in last place in the MAC, and were outscored by all opponents by a combined total of 196 to 125.

The team's statistical leaders were Bill Bradshaw with 414 passing yards, John Ladd with 266 rushing yards, and Jack Hecker with 274 receiving yards. John Ladd was the team captain. Bill Bradshaw received the team's Most Valuable Player award.

Bob Whittaker, who had coached the Bowling Green football team since 1941, resigned the post in late February 1955, though he remained with the school as an assistant professor in the department of health and physical education. Whittaker compiled a 66–50–7 record in his 14 seasons at the school's head football coach.

== Schedule ==
Date	Opponent	Site	Result	Attendance	Source
September 18	at Dayton*	UD Stadium; Dayton, OH	W 18–0		
September 25	Miami (OH)	University Stadium; Bowling Green, OH	L 7–46	4,976	
October 2	Waynesburg*	University Stadium; Bowling Green, OH	L 7–12		
October 9	at Western Michigan	Waldo Stadium; Kalamazoo, MI	L 15–20		
October 16	Baldwin–Wallace*	University Stadium; Bowling Green, OH	W 13–0		
October 23	at Toledo	Glass Bowl; Toledo, OH (rivalry)	L 7–38		
October 30	at Kent State	Memorial Stadium; Kent, OH (rivalry)	L 25–28		
November 6	Marshall	University Stadium; Bowling Green, OH	L 19–26		
November 13	Ohio	University Stadium; Bowling Green, OH	L 14–26		
*Non-conference game
