= Louis F. Zarza =

American football player and coach (1909–1990)

Biographical details
- Born: August 15, 1909; Groveton, Pennsylvania, U.S.
- Died: April 13, 1990 (aged 80); Ann Arbor, Michigan, U.S.

Playing career
- 1932–1935: Michigan State
- Position: End

Coaching career (HC unless noted)
- 1936: St. Viator (assistant)
- 1937: St. Viator
- 1938: Washington HS (IN)
- 1939–1942: Arizona (line)
- 1943: Norman NAS (assistant)
- 1946: Michigan State (assistant)
- 1947: Santa Clara (line)
- 1948: Detroit Lions (line)
- 1949–1954: Wayne

Head coaching record
- Overall: 26–31–3 (college)

Louis F. Zarza (August 15, 1909 – April 13, 1990) was an American football player and coach. He served as the head football coach St. Viator College Bourbonnais, Illinois in 1927 and at Wayne University—now known as Wayne State University—in Detroit, Michigan from 1949 to 1954, compiling a career college football coaching record of 26–31–3. Zarza went to Wayne after working for one season as the line coach for the Detroit Lions of the National Football League (NFL).

== Head coaching record ==
=== College ===
Year	Team	Overall	Conference	Standing	Bowl/playoffs
St. Viator Irish (Illinois Intercollegiate Athletic Conference) (1937)
1937	St. Viator	6–2–1	2–0–1	4th	
St. Viator:		6–2–1	2–0–1		
Wayne Tartars (Independent) (1949–1954)
1949	Wayne	3–5			
1950	Wayne	2–7			
1951	Wayne	5–4			
1952	Wayne	4–4			
1953	Wayne	3–4–1			
1954	Wayne	3–5–1			
Wayne:		20–29–2			
Total:		26–31–3			
