= Wayne State Tartars football, 1950–1959 =

American college football season

1950–1959 Wayne Tartars football
- Conference: Independent
- Head coach: Louis F. Zarza (1949–1954); Herbert L. Smith (1955–1959)

The Wayne Tartars football program, 1950–1959 represented Wayne State University (known as Wayne University through 1955) during the 1950s in college football. The Tartars competed as an independent from 1950 to 1954 and as a member of the Presidents' Athletic Conference (PAC) from 1955 to 1959. The 1956 Wayne State Tartars football team won the PAC championship with a 3–0–1 record in conference games. The Tartars were led by two head coaches: Louis F. Zarza (1949–1954); and Herbert L. Smith (1955–1959).

== Decade overview ==
Year	Head coach	Overall record	Conf. record	Conf. rank	Points scored	Points against	Delta
1950	Louis F. Zarza	2–7	NA	NA	114	262	-148
1951	Louis F. Zarza	5–4	NA	NA	230	213	+17
1952	Louis F. Zarza	4–4	NA	NA	208	153	+55
1953	Louis F. Zarza	3–4–1	NA	NA	115	146	-31
1954	Louis F. Zarza	3–5–1	NA	NA	129	149	-20
1955	Herbert L. Smith	1–5–1	1–3–1	4	71	204	-133
1956	Herbert L. Smith	4–2–1	3–0–1	1	104	89	+15
1957	Herbert L. Smith	4–4	2–1	2	103	110	-7
1958	Herbert L. Smith	2–4–1	2–1–1	3	81	169	-88
1959	Herbert L. Smith	4–3	4–1	3	121	116	+5
TOTAL		32–42–5	12–6–3				

== 1950 ==
1950 Wayne Tartars football
- Conference: Independent
- Record: 2–7
- Head coach: Louis F. Zarza (2nd season)

1950 Midwestern college football independents records
	Conf.			Overall
Team	W	L	T	W		L		T
Valparaiso		–		9	–	1	–	0
No. 8 Michigan State		–		8	–	1	–	0
Xavier		–		8	–	1	–	0
John Carroll		–		8	–	2	–	0
Baldwin–Wallace		–		5	–	2	–	1
Michigan Tech		–		4	–	2	–	1
Marquette		–		5	–	3	–	1
Wabash		–		4	–	2	–	3
Butler		–		4	–	4	–	1
Notre Dame		–		4	–	4	–	1
Toledo		–		4	–	5	–	0
Bowling Green		–		3	–	4	–	2
Dayton		–		4	–	6	–	0
Youngstown		–		3	–	5	–	0
Ball State		–		2	–	4	–	1
Washington University		–		2	–	7	–	0
Wayne		–		2	–	7	–	0
Indiana State		–		1	–	7	–	1
Rose Poly		–		0	–	8	–	0
Rankings from AP Poll

The 1950 Wayne Tartars football team represented Wayne University (later renamed Wayne State University) as an independent during the 1950 college football season. In their second year under head coach Louis F. Zarza, the Tartars compiled a 2–7 record and were outscored by a total of 262 to 114.

=== Schedule ===
Date	Opponent	Site	Result	Attendance	Source
September 23	South Dakota	Detroit, MI	W 19–14	4,000	
September 29	at Detroit	University of Detroit Stadium; Detroit, MI	L 0–34	19,257	
October 7	Western Illinois	University of Detroit Stadium; Detroit, MI	L 20–21	7,767	
October 14	at Michigan State Normal	Briggs Field; Ypsilanti, MI	W 26–6	5,000	
October 21	at Temple	Temple Stadium; Philadelphia, PA	L 0–26	5,000	
October 28	at Omaha	Omaha, NE	L 13–32		
November 4	South Dakota State^{†}	University of Detroit Stadium; Detroit, MI	L 0–40	2,911	
November 11	at Bradley	Peoria Stadium; Peoria, IL	L 29–33		
November 18	at Toledo	Glass Bowl; Toledo, OH	L 7–56		
^{†}Homecoming

== 1951 ==
1951 Wayne Tartars football
- Conference: Independent
- Record: 5–4
- Head coach: Louis F. Zarza (3rd season)
- Home stadium: University of Detroit Stadium

1951 Midwestern college football independents records
	Conf.			Overall
Team	W	L	T	W		L		T
No. 2 Michigan State		–		9	–	0	–	0
Xavier		–		9	–	0	–	1
Wabash		–		7	–	0	–	1
No. 13 Notre Dame		–		7	–	2	–	1
Dayton		–		7	–	3	–	0
Michigan Tech		–		4	–	2	–	1
Toledo		–		6	–	4	–	0
Washington University		–		5	–	4	–	0
Wayne		–		5	–	4	–	0
Bowling Green		–		4	–	4	–	1
Marquette		–		4	–	6	–	1
Baldwin–Wallace		–		3	–	5	–	0
John Carroll		–		3	–	6	–	0
Rose Poly		–		2	–	5	–	0
Youngstown		–		2	–	6	–	1
Rankings from AP Poll

The 1951 Wayne Tartars football team represented Wayne University (later renamed Wayne State University) as an independent during the 1951 college football season. In their third year under head coach Louis F. Zarza, the Tartars compiled a 5–4 record and outscored opponents by a total of 230 to 213.

=== Schedule ===
Date	Opponent	Site	Result	Attendance	Source
September 22	at Iowa State	Williams Stadium; Ames, IA	L 21–53	9,145–10,000	
September 29	Louisville	University of Detroit Stadium; Detroit, MI	L 12–28	7,500	
October 6	at Arizona State	Goodwin Stadium; Tempe, AZ	L 6–50		
October 13	Bradley	University of Detroit Stadium; Detroit, MI	L 27–34	3,021	
October 20	Brandeis	University of Detroit Stadium; Detroit, MI	W 34–6	3,278	
October 27	Omaha	University of Detroit Stadium; Detroit, MI	W 62–9	3,000	
November 3	Washington University^{†}	University of Detroit Stadium; Detroit, MI	W 21–7	3,211	
November 10	at Case Tech	Cleveland, OH	W 20–13		
November 17	Michigan State Normal	University of Detroit Stadium; Detroit, MI	W 27–13	2,347	
^{†}Homecoming

== 1952 ==
1952 Wayne Tartars football
- Conference: Independent
- Record: 4–4
- Head coach: Louis F. Zarza (4th season)
- Home stadium: University of Detroit Stadium

1952 Midwestern college football independents records
	Conf.			Overall
Team	W	L	T	W		L		T
No. 1 Michigan State		–		9	–	0	–	0
Michigan Tech		–		6	–	1	–	0
No. 3 Notre Dame		–		7	–	2	–	1
Carthage		–		5	–	2	–	0
Youngstown		–		4	–	3	–	1
Wabash		–		5	–	4	–	0
Dayton		–		6	–	5	–	0
Baldwin–Wallace		–		4	–	4	–	0
Wayne		–		4	–	4	–	0
Bradley		–		4	–	5	–	0
John Carroll		–		4	–	5	–	0
Washington University		–		4	–	5	–	0
Rose Poly		–		3	–	4	–	1
Xavier		–		4	–	6	–	0
Marquette		–		3	–	5	–	1
Drake		–		2	–	7	–	0
Rankings from AP Poll

The 1952 Wayne Tartars football team represented Wayne University (later renamed Wayne State University) as an independent during the 1952 college football season. In their fourth year under head coach Louis F. Zarza, the team compiled a 4–4 record and outscored opponents by a total of 208 to 153.

=== Schedule ===
Date	Opponent	Site	Result	Attendance	Source
September 20	Hillsdale	University of Detroit Stadium; Detroit, MI	W 20–6		
September 27	at Louisville	Parkway Field; Louisville, KY	L 12–19		
October 4	at Washington University	Francis Field; St. Louis, MO	L 12–13		
October 18	at Bradley	Peoria, IL	L 21–40		
October 25	at Brandeis	Brandeis Field; Waltham, MA	L 19–31	2,000	
November 1	Michigan State Normal^{†}	University of Detroit Stadium; Detroit, MI	W 46–19	3,515	
November 8	at Great Lakes NTS	Great Lakes, IL	W 34–19		
November 15	Valparaiso	University of Detroit Stadium; Detroit, MI	W 44–6		
^{†}Homecoming

== 1953 ==
1953 Wayne Tartars football
- Conference: Independent
- Record: 3–4–1
- Head coach: Louis F. Zarza (5th season)

1953 Midwestern college football independents records
	Conf.			Overall
Team	W	L	T	W		L		T
No. 2 Notre Dame		–		9	–	0	–	1
Cincinnati		–		9	–	1	–	0
Carthage		–		8	–	1	–	0
Youngstown		–		7	–	1	–	0
John Carroll		–		7	–	2	–	0
Washington University		–		7	–	2	–	0
Rose Poly		–		6	–	2	–	0
Wabash		–		6	–	2	–	1
Marquette		–		6	–	3	–	1
Baldwin–Wallace		–		4	–	4	–	0
Drake		–		4	–	4	–	0
Wayne		–		3	–	4	–	1
Dayton		–		3	–	5	–	1
Michigan Tech		–		2	–	5	–	0
Xavier		–		2	–	7	–	1
Rankings from AP Poll

The 1953 Wayne Tartars football team represented Wayne University (later renamed Wayne State University) as an independent during the 1953 college football season. In their fifth year under head coach Louis F. Zarza, the team compiled a 3–4–1 record and was outscored by a total of 146 to 115.

The team's statistical leaders included:

- Right halfback Victor Zucco tallied 637 rushing yards on 79 carries. Zucco was also the team's leading scorer with 54 points on nine touchdowns and the team's leading receiver with 301 receiving yards on 23 catches.
- Left halfback John Kelly tallied 452 rushing yards on 77 carries.
- Quarterback Dick Lisabeth completed 23 of 53 passes for 335 yards, two touchdowns, and two interceptions. Lisabeth was also the team's punter, averaging 30.2 yards on 30 punts.
- Right end Jack Crittendon tallied 20 receptions for 247 yards.

=== Schedule ===
Date	Time	Opponent	Site	Result	Attendance	Source
September 19		Great Lakes NTS	Detroit, MI	L 6–33		
September 25		at Detroit	University of Detroit Stadium; Detroit, MI	L 0–48	19,300	
October 3		at Michigan State Normal	Briggs Field; Ypsilanti, MI	L 6–13		
October 10	3:00 p.m.	at Washington University	Francis Field; St. Louis, MO	W 33–13	4,000	
October 17		Bradley	Detroit, MI	W 32–0		
October 24		Brandeis	Detroit, MI	L 0–6		
November 6	9:00 p.m.	at Drake	Des Moines, IA	W 25–19		
November 14		Valparaiso	Detroit, MI	T 14–14		
All times are in Eastern time

== 1954 ==
1954 Wayne Tartars football
- Conference: Independent
- Record: 3–5–1
- Head coach: Louis F. Zarza (6th season)
- Home stadium: Tartar Field

1954 Midwestern college football independents records
	Conf.			Overall
Team	W	L	T	W		L		T
Omaha		–		10	–	0	–	0
No. 4 Notre Dame		–		9	–	1	–	0
Wabash		–		7	–	1	–	1
Cincinnati		–		8	–	2	–	0
Youngstown		–		7	–	2	–	0
Washington University		–		6	–	3	–	0
Carthage		–		5	–	3	–	0
Dayton		–		5	–	5	–	0
Michigan Tech		–		3	–	4	–	0
Marquette		–		3	–	5	–	1
Wayne		–		3	–	5	–	1
John Carroll		–		3	–	5	–	0
Rose Poly		–		2	–	5	–	0
Drake		–		2	–	7	–	0
Xavier		–		2	–	8	–	0
Baldwin–Wallace		–		1	–	8	–	0
Rankings from AP Poll

The 1954 Wayne Tartars football team represented Wayne University (later renamed Wayne State University) as an independent during the 1954 college football season. In their fifth year under head coach Louis F. Zarza, the Tartars compiled a 3–5–1 record and were outscored by a total of 149 to 129.

=== Schedule ===
Date	Opponent	Site	Result	Attendance	Source
September 17	Hillsdale	Tartar Field; Detroit, MI	T 7–7		
September 24	Louisville	Tartar Field; Detroit, MI	W 13–0		
October 1	at Michigan State Normal	Briggs Field; Ypsilanti, MI	L 0–7	4,000	
October 9	Washington University	Tartar Field; Detroit, MI	W 27–0	2,299	
October 16	at John Carroll	Cleveland, OH	L 0–13		
October 23	North Dakota State	Tartar Field; Detroit, MI	W 39–0	647	
October 30	at Bradley	Peoria, IL	L 12–30		
November 6	at Omaha	University Stadium; Omaha, NE	L 7–59	6,100	
November 12	Drake	Tartar Field; Detroit, MI	L 24–33	580	

== 1955 ==
1955 Wayne Tartars football
- Conference: Presidents' Athletic Conference
- Record: 1–5–1 (1–3–1 PAC)
- Head coach: Herbert L. Smith (2nd season)
- Home stadium: Tartar Field

1955 Presidents' Athletic Conference football standings
	Conf.					Overall
Team	W		L		T	W		L		T
Western Reserve $	3	–	0	–	0	5	–	1	–	1
John Carroll	2	–	2	–	1	3	–	3	–	1
Case Tech	2	–	3	–	0	3	–	3	–	0
Wayne	1	–	3	–	1	1	–	5	–	1
$ – Conference champion

The 1955 Wayne Tartars football team represented Wayne University (later renamed Wayne State University) as an independent during the 1955 college football season. In their second year under head coach Herbert L. Smith, the Tartars compiled a 1–5–1 record (1–3–1 in conference games), finished in fourth place in the PAC, and were outscored by a total of 204 to 71.

=== Schedule ===
Date	Opponent	Site	Result	Attendance	Source
October 1	at Louisville*	Parkway Field; Louisville, KY	L 0–72		
October 8	Case Tech	Tartar Field; Detroit, MI	W 27–14		
October 15	John Carroll	Tartar Field; Detroit, MI	L 25–44	1,000	
October 22	at Case Tech	Cleveland, OH	L 0–32		
October 29	Western Reserve	Tartar Field; Detroit, MI	L 6–7		
November 5	Omaha*	Tartar Field; Detroit, MI	L 13–35		
November 19	at John Carroll	Cleveland, OH	T 0–0		
*Non-conference game

== 1956 ==
1956 Wayne State Tartars football

PAC champion
- Conference: Presidents' Athletic Conference
- Record: 4–2–1 (3–0–1 PAC)
- Head coach: Herbert L. Smith (3rd season)
- Home stadium: Tartar Field

1956 Presidents' Athletic Conference football standings
	Conf.					Overall
Team	W		L		T	W		L		T
Wayne State (MI) $	3	–	0	–	1	4	–	2	–	1
John Carroll	2	–	0	–	1	4	–	1	–	2
Western Reserve	1	–	2	–	0	4	–	3	–	0
Case Tech	0	–	4	–	0	1	–	6	–	0
$ – Conference champion

The 1956 Wayne State Tartars football team represented Wayne State University as an independent during the 1956 college football season. In their third year under head coach Herbert L. Smith, the Tartars compiled a 4–2–1 record (3–0–1 in conference games), won the PAC championship, and outscored opponents by a total of 104 to 89.

The team's statistical leaders included halfback John D. Goggins (374 rushing yards), quarterback Ronald Kowalczyk (282 passing yards), end John Poplawski (15 receptions for 186 yards), and fullback Alister Mackenzie (24 points scored).

=== Schedule ===
Date	Opponent	Site	Result	Attendance	Source
October 6	at Case Tech	Cleveland, OH	W 6–0		
October 13	Kalamazoo*	Tartar Field; Detroit, MI	W 19–7		
October 20	Case Tech	Tartar Field; Detroit, MI	W 28–7		
October 27	at Western Reserve	Cleveland, OH	W 10–7		
November 3	at Omaha*	Omaha, NE	L 0–21		
November 10	Valparaiso*	Tartar Field; Detroit, MI	L 27–33		
November 17	John Carroll	Tartar Field; Detroit, MI	T 14–14		
*Non-conference game

== 1957 ==
1957 Wayne State Tartars football
- Conference: Presidents' Athletic Conference
- Record: 4–4 (2–1 PAC)
- Head coach: Herbert L. Smith (4th season)
- Home stadium: Tartar Field

1957 Presidents' Athletic Conference football standings
	Conf.					Overall
Team	W		L		T	W		L		T
John Carroll $	3	–	0	–	0	6	–	1	–	0
Wayne State (MI)	2	–	1	–	0	4	–	4	–	0
Western Reserve	1	–	2	–	0	2	–	4	–	0
Case Tech	0	–	3	–	0	0	–	5	–	1
$ – Conference champion

The 1957 Wayne State Tartars football team represented Wayne State University as an independent during the 1957 college football season. In their fourth year under head coach Herbert L. Smith, the Tartars compiled a 4–4 record (2–1 in conference games), finished in second place in the PAC, and were outscored by a total of 110 to 103.

Halfback Jim MacMillan led the team in rushing (404 yards) and scoring (43 points on seven touchdowns and an extra point). Quarterback Ron Kowalczyk led the team in passing (604 yards), total offense (650 yards), and punting (33 punts, 30.1 yards per punt). End John Poplawski was the leading receiver with 14 receptions for 166 yards.

=== Schedule ===
Date	Opponent	Site	Result	Attendance	Source
October 5	Case Tech	Tartar Field; Detroit, MI	W 27–7		
October 12	at John Carroll	Cleveland, OH	L 6–19		
October 19	at Kalamazoo*	Kalamazoo, MI	W 9–2		
October 26	Western Reserve	Tartar Field; Detroit, MI	W 21–10		
November 2	at Buffalo*	Rotary Field; Buffalo, NY	L 7–33		
November 9	at Valparaiso*	LaPorte, IN	L 7–18		
November 16	Northern Michigan*	Tartar Field; Detroit, MI	W 26–21		
*Non-conference game

== 1958 ==
1958 Wayne State Tartars football
- Conference: Presidents' Athletic Conference
- Record: 2–4–1 (2–1–1 PAC)
- Head coach: Herbert L. Smith (5th season)
- Home stadium: Tartar Field

1958 Presidents' Athletic Conference football standings
	Conf.					Overall
Team	W		L		T	W		L		T
Western Reserve $	4	–	0	–	0	4	–	3	–	0
Allegheny	3	–	1	–	1	3	–	4	–	1
Wayne State (MI)	2	–	1	–	1	2	–	4	–	1
Thiel *	1	–	1	–	1	2	–	4	–	1
John Carroll	3	–	4	–	0	3	–	4	–	0
Case Tech	2	–	3	–	1	2	–	4	–	1
Bethany (WV)	1	–	3	–	0	1	–	6	–	1
Washington & Jefferson	1	–	4	–	0	1	–	7	–	0
$ – Conference champion; * Ineligible for conference title

The 1958 Wayne State Tartars football team represented Wayne State University as an independent during the 1958 college football season. In their fifth year under head coach Herbert L. Smith, the Tartars compiled a 2–4–1 record (2–1–1 in conference games), finished in third place in the PAC, and were outscored by a total of 169 to 81.

Halfback James MacMillan led the team in rushing (517 yards), total offense (867 yards), and scoring (37 points). Other leaders included quarterback Michael Soluk (454 passing yards) and end Wayne Mueller (272 receiving yards).

=== Schedule ===
Date	Opponent	Site	Result	Attendance	Source
October 4	Case Tech	Tartar Field; Detroit, MI	T 7–7		
October 11	John Carroll	Tartar Field; Detroit, MI	W 33–20		
October 18	at Case Tech	Cleveland, OH	W 21–6		
October 25	at Western Reserve	Cleveland, OH	L 0–26		
November 1	at Northern Michigan*	Marquette, MI	L 0–39		
November 8	No. 15 Buffalo*	Tartar Field; Detroit, MI	L 14–44	2,000	
November 15	Valparaiso*	Tartar Field; Detroit, MI	L 6–27		
*Non-conference game; Rankings from UPI Poll released prior to the game

== 1959 ==
1959 Wayne State Tartars football
- Conference: Presidents' Athletic Conference
- Record: 4–3 (4–1 PAC)
- Head coach: Herbert L. Smith (6th season)
- Home stadium: Tartar Field

1959 Presidents' Athletic Conference football standings
	Conf.					Overall
Team	W		L		T	W		L		T
John Carroll $	6	–	0	–	0	7	–	0	–	0
Allegheny	4	–	1	–	0	6	–	2	–	0
Wayne State (MI)	4	–	1	–	0	4	–	3	–	0
Western Reserve	3	–	2	–	0	3	–	4	–	0
Thiel	1	–	4	–	1	1	–	5	–	1
Case Tech	1	–	4	–	0	1	–	6	–	0
Bethany (WV)	1	–	4	–	0	1	–	8	–	0
Washington & Jefferson	0	–	4	–	1	1	–	6	–	0
$ – Conference champion

The 1959 Wayne State Tartars football team represented Wayne State University as an independent during the 1959 college football season. In their sixth and final year under head coach Herbert L. Smith, the Tartars compiled a 2–4–1 record (2–1–1 in conference games), finished in third place in the PAC, and outscored opponents by a total of 121 to 116.

Halfback Dick Laskowski led the team in rushing (328 yards), passing (101 yards),total offense (429 yards). End Dale Mandrell led the team in receiving with 15 catches for 125 yards. Fullback James Morse led the team in scoring with 36 points on six touchdowns.

=== Schedule ===
Date	Opponent	Site	Result	Attendance	Source
October 3	Case Tech	Tartar Field; Detroit, MI	W 27–6		
October 10	Allegheny	Tartar Field; Detroit, MI	W 20–7		
October 17	at John Carroll	Hosford Stadium; Cleveland Heights, OH	L 0–40		
October 24	Northern Michigan*	Tartar Field; Detroit, MI	L 13–20		
October 31	Western Reserve^{†}	Tartar Field; Detroit, MI	W 27–14		
November 7	at Thiel	Greenville, PA	W 28–15		
November 14	at Valparaiso*	Valpraraiso, IN	L 6–14		
*Non-conference game; ^{†}Homecoming
