= 1954 Omaha Indians football team =

American college football season

1954 Omaha Indians football

Tangerine Bowl champion

Tangerine Bowl, W 7–6 vs. Eastern Kentucky
- Conference: Independent
- Record: 10–0
- Head coach: Lloyd Cardwell (8th season)
- Captains: Rudy Rotella; Emil Radik
- Home stadium: University Stadium

1954 Midwestern college football independents records
| | Conf. | | | Overall |
| Team | W | L | T | W | | L | | T |
|---|---|---|---|---|---|---|---|---|
| Omaha | | – | | 10 | – | 0 | – | 0 |
| No. 4 Notre Dame | | – | | 9 | – | 1 | – | 0 |
| Wabash | | – | | 7 | – | 1 | – | 1 |
| Cincinnati | | – | | 8 | – | 2 | – | 0 |
| Youngstown | | – | | 7 | – | 2 | – | 0 |
| Washington University | | – | | 6 | – | 3 | – | 0 |
| Carthage | | – | | 5 | – | 3 | – | 0 |
| Dayton | | – | | 5 | – | 5 | – | 0 |
| Michigan Tech | | – | | 3 | – | 4 | – | 0 |
| Marquette | | – | | 3 | – | 5 | – | 1 |
| Wayne | | – | | 3 | – | 5 | – | 1 |
| John Carroll | | – | | 3 | – | 5 | – | 0 |
| Rose Poly | | – | | 2 | – | 5 | – | 0 |
| Drake | | – | | 2 | – | 7 | – | 0 |
| Xavier | | – | | 2 | – | 8 | – | 0 |
| Baldwin–Wallace | | – | | 1 | – | 8 | – | 0 |
Rankings from AP Poll

The 1954 Omaha Indians football team was an American football team that represented the University of Omaha (now known as the University of Nebraska Omaha) as an independent during the 1954 college football season. In their eighth year under head coach Lloyd Cardwell, the Indians compiled a perfect 10–0 record, defeated Eastern Kentucky in the 1955 Tangerine Bowl, and outscored opponents by a total of 360 to 67. The Tangerine Bowl was the first bowl game in Omaha program history.

Omaha tailback Bill Engelhardt was the national total offense champion among small college players with 1,645 yards. He tallied 584 rushing yards on 134 carries and 1,061 passing yards (56 of 109 passing) during the regular season. He also scored 88 points on 13 touchdowns and 10 extra points. Engelhardt also tallied 151 yards and scored all seven Omaha points in the Tangerine Bowl.

The team played its home games at University Stadium in Omaha, Nebraska.

== Schedule ==
| Date | Opponent | Site | Result | Attendance | Source |
|---|---|---|---|---|---|
| September 18 | at Fort Hays | Hays, KS | W 27–19 | | |
| September 25 | at Morningside | Public Schools Stadium; Sioux City, IA | W 45–0 | | |
| October 2 | Washburn | University Stadium; Omaha, NE | W 27–6 | 2,500 | |
| October 9 | Bradley | University Stadium; Omaha, NE (Centennial Day) | W 39–0 | 3,500 | |
| October 16 | at Emporia State | Welch Stadium; Emporia, KS | W 38–6 | | |
| October 23 | St. Ambrose^{†} | University Stadium; Omaha, NE | W 35–14 | 5,500 | |
| October 30 | at Northern Illinois State | Glidden Field; DeKalb, IL | W 26–7 | 4,000 | |
| November 6 | Wayne | University Stadium; Omaha, NE | W 59–7 | 6,100 | |
| November 11 | Doane | University Stadium; Omaha, NE (Armistice Day) | W 57–2 | 3,200 | |
| January 1, 1955 | vs. Eastern Kentucky | Tangerine Bowl; Orlando, FL (Tangerine Bowl) | W 7–6 | 12,759 | |
^{†}Homecoming
