= Marianna Historic District (Marianna, Pennsylvania) =

Historic district in Pennsylvania, United States

- U.S. National Register of Historic Places
- U.S. Historic district
- Washington County History & Landmarks Foundation Landmark
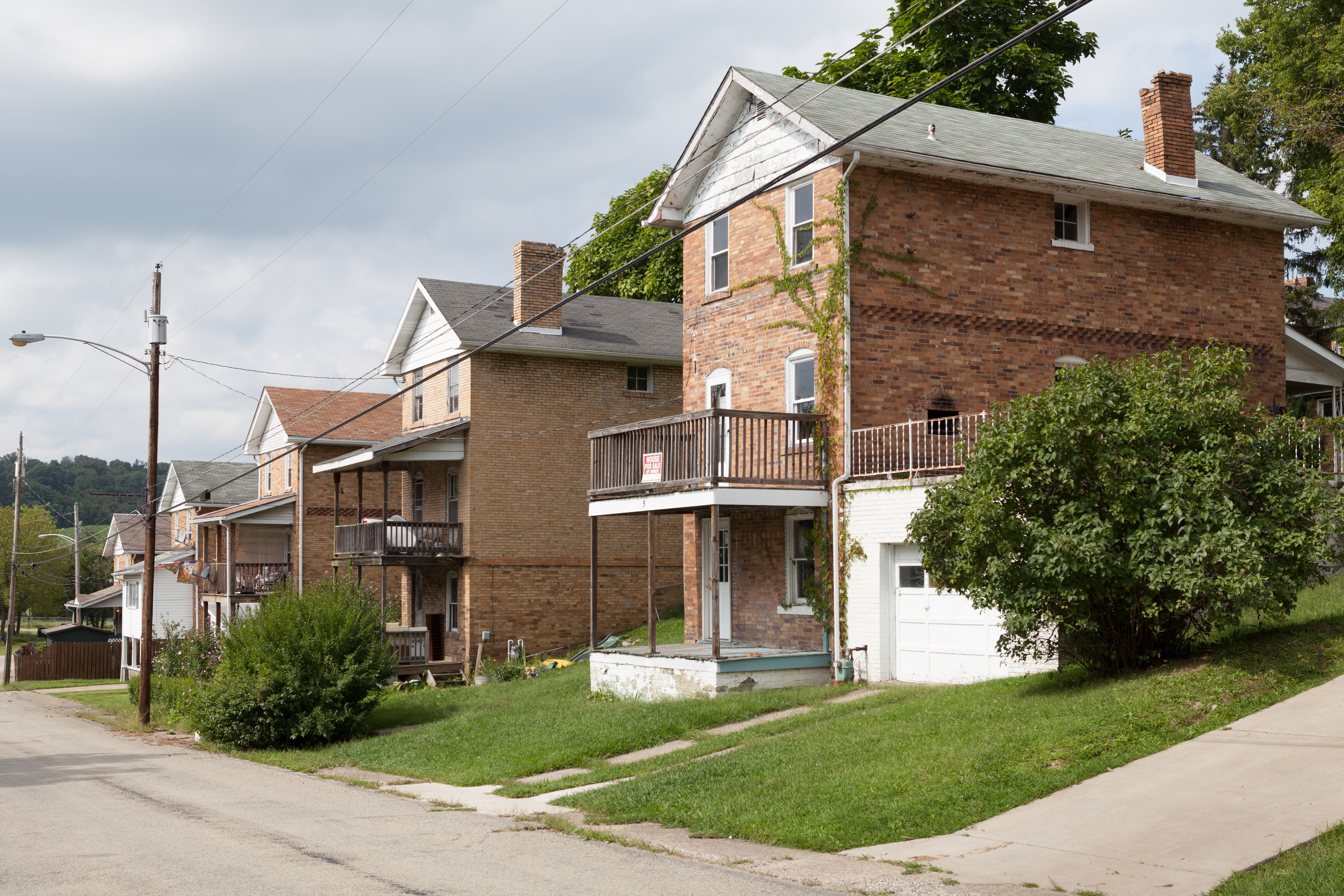
- Near 56 Beeson St looking northwest

- Location within Pennsylvania Location within the United States
- Location: Roughly bounded by Ten Mile Creek, Beeson Ave. Hill, 6th, and 7th Sts., Marianna, Pennsylvania
- Coordinates: 40°1′21″N 80°5′53″W
- Area: 128.6 acres (52.0 ha)
- Built: 1906
- NRHP reference No.: 84000560
- Added to NRHP: November 15, 1984

Marianna Historic District is a historic district in Marianna, Pennsylvania.

It is designated as a historic district by the Washington County History & Landmarks Foundation.

== Gallery ==
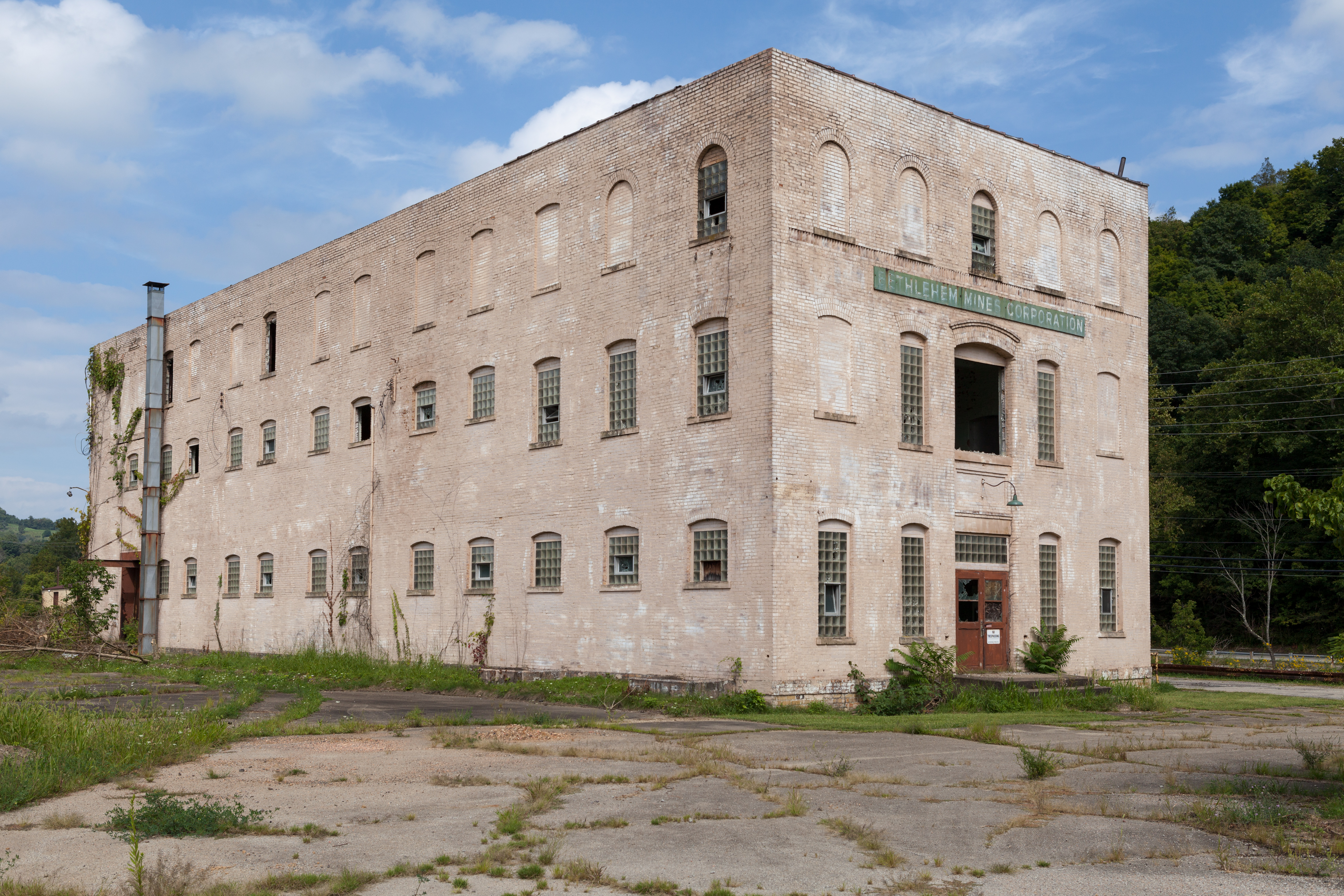
Bethlehem Mines Building

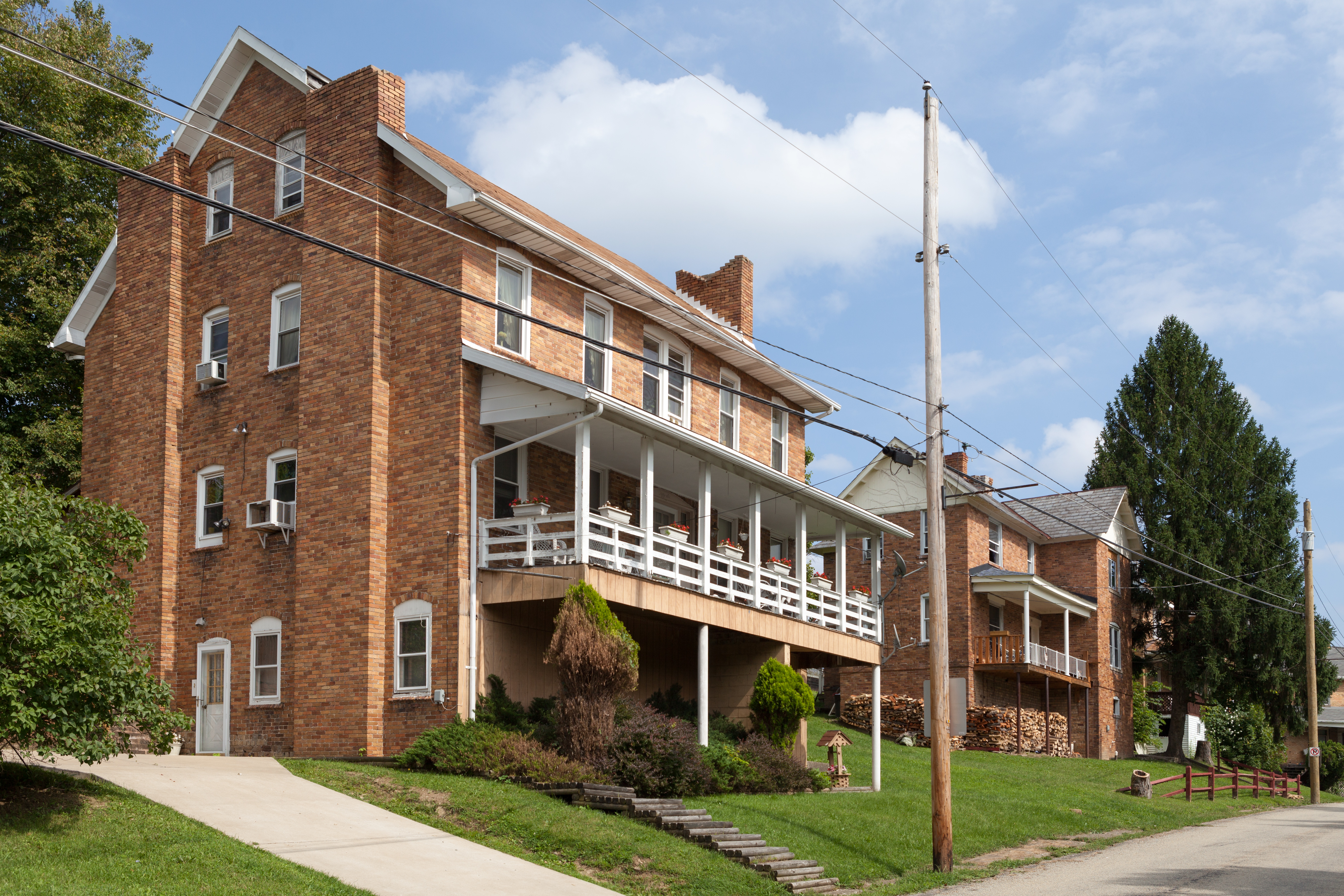
Near 56 Beeson St. looking southwest
