= 1954 Washington University Bears football team =

American college football season

1954 Washington University Bears football
- Conference: Independent
- Record: 6–3
- Head coach: Carl Snavely (2nd season)
- Home stadium: Francis Field

1954 Midwestern college football independents records
| | Conf. | | | Overall |
| Team | W | L | T | W | | L | | T |
|---|---|---|---|---|---|---|---|---|
| Omaha | | – | | 10 | – | 0 | – | 0 |
| No. 4 Notre Dame | | – | | 9 | – | 1 | – | 0 |
| Wabash | | – | | 7 | – | 1 | – | 1 |
| Cincinnati | | – | | 8 | – | 2 | – | 0 |
| Youngstown | | – | | 7 | – | 2 | – | 0 |
| Washington University | | – | | 6 | – | 3 | – | 0 |
| Carthage | | – | | 5 | – | 3 | – | 0 |
| Dayton | | – | | 5 | – | 5 | – | 0 |
| Michigan Tech | | – | | 3 | – | 4 | – | 0 |
| Marquette | | – | | 3 | – | 5 | – | 1 |
| Wayne | | – | | 3 | – | 5 | – | 1 |
| John Carroll | | – | | 3 | – | 5 | – | 0 |
| Rose Poly | | – | | 2 | – | 5 | – | 0 |
| Drake | | – | | 2 | – | 7 | – | 0 |
| Xavier | | – | | 2 | – | 8 | – | 0 |
| Baldwin–Wallace | | – | | 1 | – | 8 | – | 0 |
Rankings from AP Poll

The 1954 Washington University Bears football team represented Washington University in St. Louis as an independent during the 1954 college football season. Led by second-year head coach Carl Snavely, the Bears compiled a record of 6–3. Washington University played home games at Francis Field in St. Louis.

== Schedule ==
| Date | Time | Opponent | Site | Result | Attendance | Source |
|---|---|---|---|---|---|---|
| September 25 | 2:00 p.m. | Missouri Mines | Francis Field; St. Louis, MO | W 58–14 | 6,000 | |
| October 2 | 2:00 p.m. | Illinois Wesleyan | Francis Field; St. Louis, MO | W 52–7 | 5,500 | |
| October 9 | 2:00 p.m. | at Wayne | Tartar Field; Detroit, MI | L 0–27 | 2,299 | |
| October 16 | 2:00 p.m. | at Western Reserve | Francis Field; St. Louis, MO | W 33–6 | | |
| October 23 | 2:00 p.m. | Western Michigan^{†} | Francis Field; St. Louis, MO | L 6–7 | 8,000 | |
| October 30 | 2:00 p.m. | Evansville | Francis Field; St. Louis, MO | W 42–7 | 3,000 | |
| November 6 | | at Butler | Butler Bowl; Indianapolis, IN | W 25–6 | | |
| November 13 | | at Southern Illinois | McAndrew Stadium; Carbondale, IL | W 25–14 | 4,500 | |
| November 20 | | at Bradley | Peoria, IL | L 19–20 | | |
^{†}Homecoming; All times are in Central time
