= Marianna, Pennsylvania =

Borough in Pennsylvania, US

Marianna
- Borough
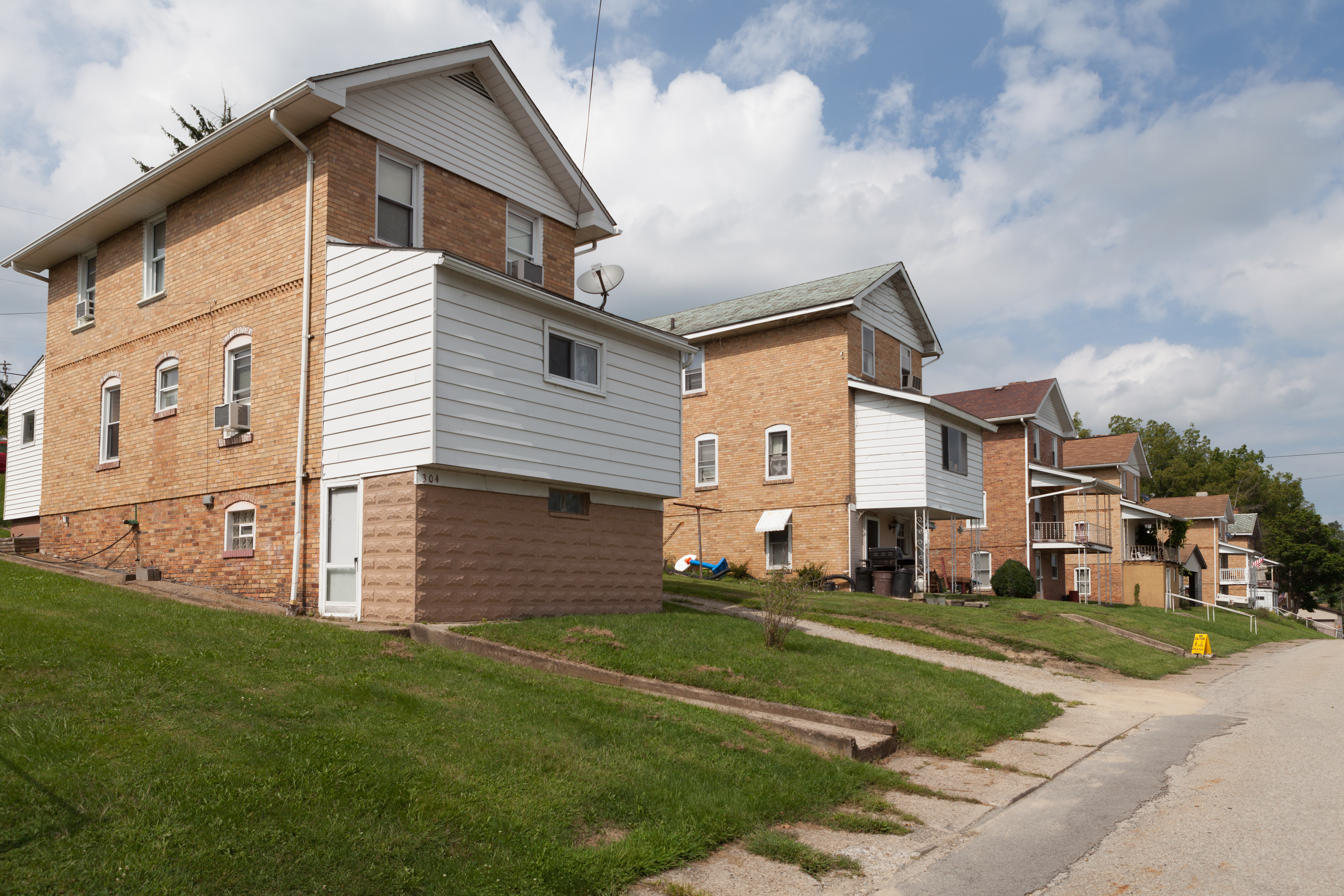
- Houses on Second Street

- Location of Marianna in Washington County, Pennsylvania.

- Location of Marianna in Pennsylvania
- Coordinates: 40°0′56″N 80°6′38″W
- Country: United States
- State: Pennsylvania
- County: Washington
- Established: 1907

Government
  - Mayor: Hon. Anita Kadlecek

Area
  - Total: 1.96 sq mi (5.07 km^{2})
  - Land: 1.96 sq mi (5.07 km^{2})
  - Water: 0 sq mi (0.00 km^{2})

Population (2020)
  - Total: 538
  - Density: 203.9/sq mi (78.74/km^{2})
- Time zone: UTC-4 (EST)
  - Summer (DST): UTC-5 (EDT)
- ZIP code: 15345
- Area code: 724
- FIPS code: 42-47400

Marianna is a borough in Washington County, Pennsylvania, United States. The population was 399 at the 2020 census.

== History ==
Marianna was built as a mining town for the Pittsburgh Buffalo Company in 1907 and was incorporated in 1910. At the time of its construction, the Marianna Mine was among the most modern and well equipped in the world. The town's brick homes were designed to offer indoor bathrooms, fenced yards and other amenities making living conditions very attractive for the time.

At 10:55 a.m. on the morning of Saturday, November 28, 1908, an explosion occurred in the mine which killed 154 men and left only one survivor. Although the mine was quickly refurbished by the Pittsburgh Buffalo Company, the colliery's fortunes flagged. By 1914, the mine was sold to the Union Coal and Coke Company and later to Bethlehem Steel which continued to extract coal until 1988, when the main conveyor caught fire. The fire was extinguished, but the mine closed anyway.

The Marianna Historic District was listed on the National Register of Historic Places in 1984.

== Geography ==
Marianna is located at 40°0′56″N 80°6′38″W (40.015626, -80.110483).

According to the United States Census Bureau, the borough has a total area of 2.0 square miles (5.2 km^{2}), all land.

== Demographics ==
Historical population
Census	Pop.	Note	%±
1910	1,363		—
1920	1,124		−17.5%
1930	1,762		56.8%
1940	1,493		−15.3%
1950	1,269		−15.0%
1960	1,088		−14.3%
1970	875		−19.6%
1980	907		3.7%
1990	616		−32.1%
2000	626		1.6%
2010	494		−21.1%
2020	399		−19.2%
2025 (est.)	386	▼	−3.3%

At the 2000 census there were 626 people in 236 households, including 157 families, in the borough. The population density was 320.3 inhabitants per square mile (123.7/km^{2}). There were 259 housing units at an average density of 132.5 per square mile (51.2/km^{2}). The racial makeup of the borough was 89.14% White, 8.79% African American, 0.80% Native American, and 1.28% from two or more races. Of the 236 households 33.1% had children under the age of 18 living with them, 50.4% were married couples living together, 13.1% had a female householder with no husband present, and 33.1% were non-families. 29.2% of households were one person and 16.1% were one person aged 65 or older. The average household size was 2.65 and the average family size was 3.30.

The age distribution was 29.9% under the age of 18, 7.8% from 18 to 24, 28.1% from 25 to 44, 19.0% from 45 to 64, and 15.2% 65 or older. The median age was 33 years. For every 100 females there were 85.8 males. For every 100 females age 18 and over, there were 84.5 males.

The median household income was $28,333 and the median family income was $31,750. Males had a median income of $24,688 versus $20,893 for females. The per capita income for the borough was $11,925. About 14.2% of families and 19.3% of the population were below the poverty line, including 35.1% of those under age 18 and 7.8% of those age 65 or over.
